= 2024–25 Primera Federación =

Primera Federación
- Season: 2024–25
- Dates: 24 August 2024 – June 2025
- Champions: Ceuta (1st title)
- Promoted: Andorra; Ceuta; Cultural Leonesa; Real Sociedad B
- Relegated: Alcoyano; Amorebieta; Barcelona Atlètic; Fuenlabrada; Gimnástica Segoviana; Intercity; Real Unión; Recreativo; Sestao River; Yeclano
- Top goalscorer: Gonzalo García (25 goals)
- Biggest home win: Real Madrid Castilla 6–0 Mérida (30 November 2024)
- Biggest away win: Betis Deportivo 0–4 Mérida (1 February 2025); Osasuna B 1–5 Sestao River (30 March 2025)
- Highest scoring: Andorra 7–2 Osasuna B (8 December 2024)

The 2024–25 Primera Federación, also known as Primera Federación Versus e-Learning due to sponsorship reasons, is the fourth for the Primera Federación, the third-highest level in the Spanish football league system. Forty teams will participate, divided into two groups of twenty clubs each based on geographical proximity. In each group, the champions are automatically promoted to Segunda División and the second to fifth placers will play promotion play-offs and the bottom five are relegated to the Segunda Federación.

== Overview before the season ==
A total of 40 teams joined the league, including four relegated from the 2023–24 Segunda División, 26 retained from the 2023–24 Primera Federación, and ten promoted from the 2023–24 Segunda Federación. The groups were defined by the RFEF on 2 July 2024.

=== Team changes ===
Promoted from 2023–24 Segunda Federación	Relegated from 2023–24 Segunda División	Promoted to 2024–25 Segunda División	Relegated to 2024–25 Segunda Federación
Barakaldo; Betis Deportivo; Bilbao Athletic; Gimnástica Segoviana; Hércules; Marbella; Ourense; Sevilla Atlético; Yeclano; Zamora	Alcorcón; Amorebieta; Andorra; Villarreal B	Castellón; Deportivo La Coruña; Málaga; Córdoba	Atlético Baleares; Cornellà; Linares; SD Logroñés; Melilla; Rayo Majadahonda; Recreativo Granada; Sabadell; San Fernando; Teruel

== Groups ==
=== Group 1 (North) ===
Location of teams in the 2024–25 Primera Federación – Group 1
Location of teams in 2024–25 Primera Federación – Group 1 (Basque Country)

==== Teams and locations ====
Team	Home city	Stadium	Capacity
Amorebieta	Amorebieta-Etxano	Urritxe	3,000
Andorra	Andorra la Vella	Estadi Nacional d'Andorra	3,347
Arenteiro	O Carballiño	Espiñedo	4,500
Barakaldo	Barakaldo	Lasesarre	7,960
Barcelona Atlètic	Barcelona	Johan Cruyff	6,000
Bilbao Athletic	Bilbao	Lezama	3,250
Celta Fortuna	Vigo	Abanca-Balaídos	24,791
Cultural Leonesa	León	Reino de León	13,346
Gimnàstic	Tarragona	Nou Estadi	14,591
Gimnástica Segoviana	Segovia	La Albuera	6,000
Lugo	Lugo	Anxo Carro	7,070
Osasuna B	Pamplona	Tajonar	4,500
Ourense CF	Ourense	O Couto	5,659
Ponferradina	Ponferrada	El Toralín	8,400
Real Sociedad B	San Sebastián	José Luis Orbegozo	2,500
Real Unión	Irun	Stadium Gal	5,000
Sestao River	Sestao	Las Llanas	8,905
Tarazona	Tarazona	Municipal de Tarazona	5,000
Unionistas	Salamanca	Reina Sofía	5,000
Zamora	Zamora	Ruta de la Plata	7,813

==== Personnel and sponsorship ====
Team	Manager	Captain	Kit manufacturer	Shirt main sponsor
Amorebieta	(Spain) Natxo González	(Spain) Unai Marino	Nike	Sidenor
Andorra	(Spain) Beto Company	(Argentina) Nico Ratti	Nike	MoraBanc
Arenteiro	(Spain) Raúl Jardiel	(Spain) Diego García	Kappa	Oreco Balgón Constructora
Barakaldo	(Spain) Imanol de la Sota	(Spain) Ekaitz Molina	New Balance	
Barcelona Atlètic	(Spain) Sergi Milà	(Spain) Aleix Garrido	Nike	Spotify
Bilbao Athletic	(Spain) Jokin Aranbarri	(Spain) Beñat Gerenabarrena	Castore	
Celta Fortuna	(Spain) Fredi Álvarez	(Spain) Gael Alonso	Adidas	Estrella Galicia
Cultural Leonesa	(Spain) Raúl Llona	(Spain) Kevin Presa	Kappa	Aspire Academy
Gimnàstic	(Spain) Luis César Sampedro	(Spain) Joan Oriol	Adidas	Parlem Telecom
Gimnástica Segoviana	(Spain) Ramsés Gil	(Spain) Manu Olmedilla	Adidas	Cajaviva Caja Rural
Lugo	(Spain) Álex Ortiz	(Spain) Bernardo Cruz	Puma	Estrella Galicia
Osasuna B	(Spain) Santi Castillejo	(Spain) Xabi Huarte	Adidas	Jaylo
Ourense	(Spain) Pablo López	(Spain) Raúl Marqueta	Cool Sport	Estrella Galicia
Ponferradina	(Spain) Javi Rey	(Spain) Borja Valle	Adidas	Tvitec
Real Sociedad B	(Spain) Iosu Rivas	(Spain) Ander Zoilo	Macron	Amenabar
Real Unión	(Spain) Albert Carbó	(Spain) Txusta	Adidas	BM Supermercados
Sestao River	(Spain) Igor Oca	(Spain) Leandro Martínez	Adidas	Autonervión
Tarazona	(Spain) Juanma Barrero	(Spain) Marc Trilles	Adidas	Patatas Río Lombo
Unionistas	(Argentina) José Acciari	(Spain) Carlos de la Nava	Erreà	Don QR
Zamora	(Spain) Juan Sabas	(Spain) Dani Hernández	Macron	Caja Rural

==== Managerial changes ====
Team	Outgoing manager	Manner of departure	Date of vacancy	Position in table	Incoming manager	Date of appointment
Bilbao Athletic	(Spain) Carlos Gurpegui	Resigned	6 May 2024	Pre-season	(Spain) Jokin Aranbarri	6 June 2024
Unionistas	(Spain) Dani Ponz	End of contract	25 May 2024	Pre-season	(Spain) Dani Llácer	28 May 2024
Lugo	(Spain) Roberto Trashorras	Mutual agreement	3 June 2024	Pre-season	(Spain) Lolo Escobar	11 June 2024
Amorebieta	(Spain) Jandro Castro	End of contract	5 June 2024	Pre-season	(Spain) Julen Guerrero	20 June 2024
Tarazona	(Spain) Molo	End of contract	6 June 2024	Pre-season	(Spain) Juanma Barrero	1 July 2024
Arenteiro	(Spain) Javi Rey	End of contract	12 June 2024	Pre-season	(Spain) Raúl Jardiel	25 June 2024
Real Unión	(Spain) Fran Justo	End of contract	17 June 2024	Pre-season	(Spain) Mikel Llorente	21 June 2024
Sestao River	(Spain) Aitor Calle	End of contract	17 June 2024	Pre-season	(Spain) Ángel Viadero	21 June 2024
Ponferradina	(Spain) Juanfran García	End of contract	19 June 2024	Pre-season	(Spain) Javi Rey	19 June 2024
Zamora	(Spain) David Movilla	End of contract	2 July 2024	Pre-season	(Spain) Juan Sabas	4 July 2024
Barcelona Atletic	(Mexico) Rafael Márquez	Signed by Mexico	21 July 2024	Pre-season	(Spain) Albert Sánchez	25 July 2024
Ourense	(Spain) Rubén Domínguez	Resigned	22 October 2024	20th	(Spain) Adrián Abalo (caretaker)	25 October 2024
Amorebieta	(Spain) Julen Guerrero	Sacked	29 October 2024	20th	(Spain) Gorka Moreno (caretaker)	31 October 2024
Ourense	(Spain) Adrián Abalo	End of caretaker spell	5 November 2024	19th	(Spain) Pablo López	5 November 2024
Amorebieta	(Spain) Gorka Moreno	End of caretaker spell	6 November 2024	19th	(Spain) Natxo González	6 November 2024
Real Unión	(Spain) Mikel Llorente	Sacked	3 December 2024	17th	(Spain) Albert Carbó	4 December 2024
Andorra	(Spain) Ferran Costa	Sacked	20 January 2025	10th	(Spain) Beto Company	20 January 2025
Lugo	(Spain) Lolo Escobar	Sacked	20 January 2025	13th	(Spain) Toni Seligrat	22 January 2025
Barcelona Atlètic	(Spain) Albert Sánchez	Removed from role	25 February 2025	19th	(Spain) Sergi Milà	25 February 2025
Sestao River	(Spain) Ángel Viadero	Mutual agreement	4 March 2025	17th	(Spain) Igor Oca	6 March 2025
Unionistas	(Spain) Dani Llácer	Sacked	7 April 2025	12th	(Argentina) José Acciari	7 April 2025
Real Sociedad B	(Spain) Sergio Francisco	Signed with the first team	26 April 2025	4th	(Spain) Iosu Rivas	26 April 2025
Lugo	(Spain) Toni Seligrat	Sacked	4 May 2025	14th	(Spain) Álex Ortiz	5 May 2025
Gimnàstic	(Spain) Dani Vidal	Sacked	11 May 2025	5th	(Spain) Luis César Sampedro	11 May 2025

==== League table ====
Pos	Team	Pld	W	D	L	GF	GA	GD	Pts	Qualification
1	Cultural Leonesa (C, P)	38	18	11	9	55	43	+12	65 (Note: Cultural Leonesa finished ahead of Ponferradina on head-to-head goal difference: Cultural Leonesa 2–0 Ponferradina, Ponferradina 2–1 Cultural Leonesa)	Promotion to Segunda División and qualification for the Copa del Rey
2	Ponferradina	38	19	8	11	59	41	+18	65	Qualification for the promotion play-offs and Copa del Rey
3	Real Sociedad B (P)	38	17	11	10	51	33	+18	62	Qualification for the promotion play-offs
4	Andorra (P)	38	16	12	10	49	38	+11	60	Qualification for the promotion play-offs and Copa del Rey
5	Gimnàstic	38	16	11	11	59	43	+16	59	Qualification for the promotion play-offs and Copa del Rey
6	Tarazona (Y)	38	14	12	12	41	34	+7	54 (Note: Tarazona finished ahead of Bilbao Athletic on overall goal difference)	Qualification for the Copa del Rey
7	Bilbao Athletic	38	15	9	14	49	45	+4	54	
8	Celta Fortuna	38	15	8	15	54	50	+4	53 (Note: Celta Fortuna finished ahead of Zamora on head-to-head points: Celta Fortuna 2–0 Zamora, Zamora 1–1 Celta Fortuna)	
9	Zamora	38	14	11	13	44	35	+9	53	
10	Ourense CF	38	13	12	13	35	44	−9	51	
11	Barakaldo	38	13	10	15	49	44	+5	49	
12	Arenteiro	38	12	12	14	40	42	−2	48	
13	Lugo	38	12	10	16	35	47	−12	46 (Note: Head-to-head points: Lugo 10 pts, Osasuna B 4 pts, Unionistas 2 pts)	
14	Osasuna B	38	12	10	16	47	59	−12	46	
15	Unionistas	38	10	16	12	42	46	−4	46	
16	Barcelona Atlètic (R)	38	10	15	13	53	57	−4	45 (Note: Barcelona Atlètic finished ahead of Sestao River on head-to-head points: Sestao River 2–2 Barcelona Atlètic, Barcelona Atlètic 2–0 Sestao River)	Relegation to Segunda Federación
17	Sestao River (R)	38	11	12	15	40	45	−5	45	Relegation to Segunda Federación
18	Real Unión (R)	38	12	8	18	43	58	−15	44	Relegation to Segunda Federación
19	Gimnástica Segoviana (R)	38	9	15	14	43	69	−26	42	Relegation to Segunda Federación
20	Amorebieta (R)	38	10	11	17	42	57	−15	41	Relegation to Segunda Federación

Rules for classification: 1) points; 2) head-to-head points; 3) head-to-head goal difference; 4) goal difference; 5) number of goals scored
(Note: Head-to-head record is used only after all the matches between the teams in question have been played).
(C) Champions; (P) Promoted; (R) Relegated; (Y) Qualified to Copa del Rey

==== Results ====
Home \ Away	AMO	AND	ARE	BAK	BAT	ATH	CEL	CUL	GIM	GSE	LUG	OSA	OUR	PON	RSO	RUN	SES	TAR	UNI	ZAM
Amorebieta	—	1–1	3–0	2–2	2–1	0–2	4–3	1–1	0–1	0–1	1–0	1–1	2–0	3–1	0–1	1–0	2–0	2–2	3–3	0–2
Andorra	2–0	—	1–1	1–0	2–1	0–2	2–0	1–1	1–0	5–1	2–0	7–2	0–0	1–1	1–1	2–0	1–2	1–0	1–1	2–1
Arenteiro	1–1	3–0	—	1–1	1–2	1–0	1–2	0–1	4–0	2–0	2–1	1–1	1–1	0–1	1–1	3–0	2–2	2–1	0–0	1–1
Barakaldo	2–0	2–3	2–0	—	1–2	0–0	0–1	3–0	2–1	2–0	3–2	2–1	1–1	0–1	0–1	0–2	2–3	3–0	3–1	0–3
Barcelona Atlètic	0–2	1–3	2–3	2–2	—	2–2	2–2	2–0	0–2	2–2	1–1	0–2	3–0	0–3	1–1	1–1	2–0	1–1	2–1	1–0
Bilbao Athletic	2–1	1–0	1–0	0–2	2–2	—	0–1	2–0	1–3	1–2	2–2	0–1	0–2	0–0	2–1	4–2	2–0	1–1	0–1	3–3
Celta Fortuna	3–1	3–0	0–0	2–2	3–1	2–1	—	1–3	0–1	4–1	1–2	3–0	1–0	1–1	2–1	2–1	1–1	1–1	0–0	2–0
Cultural Leonesa	2–1	1–1	1–0	2–1	1–1	1–3	2–0	—	2–1	2–3	2–0	1–0	3–0	2–0	1–1	1–1	1–2	2–1	4–3	1–1
Gimnàstic	1–1	1–1	2–0	1–0	3–2	0–2	2–1	2–3	—	5–0	2–2	2–0	1–1	5–1	2–1	4–1	1–1	1–0	4–0	1–0
Gimnástica Segoviana	1–1	3–2	1–2	1–1	2–2	2–1	1–3	1–1	2–2	—	1–0	2–4	0–2	2–2	0–0	3–0	0–0	0–1	1–1	1–1
Lugo	0–0	0–0	1–1	0–0	0–4	1–0	1–0	1–4	2–2	0–1	—	3–1	0–2	0–1	1–0	3–1	2–1	1–2	2–1	2–0
Osasuna B	3–0	0–1	3–0	2–1	1–2	1–1	3–1	1–1	1–1	3–2	0–1	—	1–1	0–3	1–1	1–2	1–5	0–3	0–0	1–0
Ourense CF	0–3	0–0	0–1	1–3	1–1	1–2	1–0	1–0	2–1	0–0	2–1	0–1	—	2–1	1–0	1–0	0–0	3–2	2–2	1–0
Ponferradina	5–2	1–0	1–2	0–1	1–1	2–0	2–1	2–1	2–0	4–0	0–1	3–2	2–0	—	0–1	3–1	1–2	2–0	1–0	2–2
Real Sociedad B	2–0	2–1	0–1	2–2	3–0	1–2	2–0	2–2	1–1	4–1	1–0	3–1	2–1	3–2	—	5–0	0–1	3–2	1–0	0–1
Real Unión	1–1	0–0	1–0	1–1	1–3	3–1	3–2	0–1	1–0	5–0	3–0	1–1	0–1	2–2	0–1	—	2–1	1–0	3–2	1–2
Sestao River	1–0	0–1	2–1	0–1	2–2	0–1	2–0	1–1	3–2	1–2	0–1	1–2	2–2	0–2	0–0	0–1	—	0–2	1–1	1–1
Tarazona	3–0	0–1	2–1	1–0	0–0	1–1	2–3	1–0	0–0	2–2	0–0	1–1	4–0	1–0	0–1	0–0	1–0	—	1–0	1–0
Unionistas	1–0	3–1	0–0	1–0	2–1	3–2	2–1	1–2	1–0	0–0	1–1	1–3	2–1	1–1	1–1	4–1	0–0	0–0	—	1–1
Zamora	5–0	2–0	3–0	2–1	1–0	0–2	1–1	0–1	1–1	1–1	2–0	1–0	1–1	1–2	1–0	1–0	1–2	0–1	1–0	—

Legend: Blue = home team win; Yellow = draw; Red = away team win.

==== Top scorers ====
As of 24 May 2025

Rank	Player	Club	Goal
1	(Spain) Adrián Fuentes	Tarazona	16
2	(Spain) Manu Nieto	Andorra	13
2	(Spain) Javier Carbonell	Ourense	13
2	(Spain) Manu Justo	Cultural Leonesa	13
2	(Spain) Mikel Goti	Real Sociedad B	13

=== Group 2 (South) ===
Location of teams in the 2024–25 Primera Federación – Group 2

==== Teams and locations ====
Team	Home city	Stadium	Capacity
Alcorcón	Alcorcón	Estadio Municipal de Santo Domingo	5,100
Alcoyano	Alcoy	El Collao	4,850
Algeciras	Algeciras	Nuevo Mirador	7,200
Antequera	Antequera	El Maulí	6,000
Atlético Madrid B	Majadahonda	Cerro del Espino	3,800
Atlético Sanluqueño	Sanlúcar de Barrameda	El Palmar	5,000
Betis Deportivo	Seville	Luis del Sol	1,300
Ceuta	Ceuta	Alfonso Murube	6,500
Fuenlabrada	Fuenlabrada	Fernando Torres	5,400
Hércules	Alicante	José Rico Pérez	30,000
Ibiza	Ibiza	Can Misses	6,000
Intercity	Alicante	Antonio Solana	3,000
Marbella	Marbella	Municipal de Marbella	7,300
Mérida	Mérida	Estadio Romano	14,600
Murcia	Murcia	Enrique Roca	31,179
Real Madrid Castilla	Madrid	Alfredo di Stéfano	6,000
Recreativo	Huelva	Nuevo Colombino	21,670
Sevilla Atlético	Seville	Jesús Navas	8,000
Villarreal B	Villarreal	Estadio de la Cerámica	23,000
Yeclano	Yecla	La Constitución	4,000

==== Personnel and sponsorship ====
Team	Manager	Captain	Kit manufacturer	Shirt main sponsor
Alcorcón	(Spain) Pablo Álvarez	(Panama) Josiel Núñez	Kappa	Lynks Tic
Alcoyano	(Spain) Luis Miguel Garrido	(Spain) Imanol García	Kappa	Grow Up
Algeciras	(Spain) Fran Justo	(Spain) Iván Turrillo	Nike	
Antequera	(Spain) Javi Medina	(Argentina) Tomás Lanzini	Hummel	
Atlético Madrid B	(Spain) Fernando Torres	(Spain) Antonio Gomis	Nike	
Atlético Sanluqueño	(Spain) José Herrera	(Spain) Luis Vacas	Macron	Cohebu
Betis Deportivo	(Spain) Arzu	(Portugal) Guilherme Fernandes	Hummel	Forever Green
Ceuta	(Spain) José Juan Romero	(Spain) Jaime Morales	Kappa	ceuta
Fuenlabrada	(Spain) Rubén Anuarbe	(Spain) Álvaro Barbosa	Joma	Grupo Avimosa
Hércules	(Spain) Rubén Torrecilla	(Spain) Nico Espinosa	Kappa	Finetwork
Ibiza	(Spain) Paco Jémez	(Spain) Alberto Escassi	Puma	Power Electronics
Intercity	(Spain) José Vicente Lledó	(Spain) Álvaro Pérez	Hummel	Alpha Blue Ocean
Marbella	(Spain) Carlos de Lerma	(Spain) José Carrasco	Adidas	Marbella
Mérida	(Spain) Sergi Guilló	(Spain) Manuel Bonaque	Macron	Mérida, patrimonio de la humanidad
Murcia	(Spain) Fran Fernández	(Spain) Pedro León	Adidas	Fibranet
Real Madrid Castilla	(Spain) Raúl	(Spain) Manuel Ángel	Adidas	Emirates
Recreativo	(Spain) Raúl Galbarro	(Spain) Rubén Gálvez	Adidas	Alter Enersun
Sevilla Atlético	(Spain) Jesús Galván	(Spain) Alberto Flores	Castore	
Villarreal B	(Spain) Miguel Álvarez	(Argentina) Tiago Geralnik	Joma	Pamesa Cerámica
Yeclano	(Spain) Adrián Hernández	(Spain) Gabriel Clemente	Gobik	Karibian Descanso, Xti

==== Managerial changes ====
Team	Outgoing manager	Manner of departure	Date of vacancy	Position in table	Incoming manager	Date of appointment
Algeciras	(Spain) Lolo Escobar	End of contract	27 May 2024	Pre-season	(Spain) Fran Justo	28 June 2024
Alcorcón	(Tunisia) Mehdi Nafti	End of contract	3 June 2024	Pre-season	(Spain) Pablo Álvarez	24 June 2024
Atlético Madrid B	(Spain) Luis Tevenet	Appointed first team assistant	4 June 2024	Pre-season	(Spain) Fernando Torres	11 June 2024
Mérida	(Spain) David Rocha	Return to sporting director role	12 June 2024	Pre-season	(Spain) Sergi Guilló	12 June 2024
Atlético Sanluqueño	(Spain) Abel Segovia	End of contract	14 June 2024	Pre-season	(Spain) Aitor Martínez	20 June 2024
Murcia	(Spain) Pablo Alfaro	End of contract	24 June 2024	Pre-season	(Spain) Fran Fernández	24 June 2024
Ibiza	(Spain) Onésimo Sánchez	End of contract	27 June 2024	Pre-season	(Spain) José Luis Martí	27 June 2024
Intercity	(Argentina) Alejandro Sandroni	Sacked	24 September 2024	14th	(Spain) Dani Fernández	24 September 2024
Atlético Sanluqueño	(Spain) Aitor Martínez	Sacked	29 September 2024	19th	(Spain) Mario Fuentes	30 September 2024
Fuenlabrada	(Spain) Alfredo Sánchez	Sacked	21 October 2024	19th	(Spain) Diego Nogales (Note: Initially a caretaker, Nogales was confirmed as manager of the club on 5 November.)	24 October 2024
Ibiza	(Spain) José Luis Martí	Sacked	11 November 2024	8th	(Spain) Paco Jémez	12 November 2024
Alcoyano	(Spain) Vicente Parras	Sacked	14 November 2024	9th	(Spain) Juli Cerdá	15 November 2024
Intercity	(Spain) Dani Fernández	Demoted to assistant role	20 November 2024	20th	(Spain) Mario Simón	20 November 2024
Recreativo	(Spain) Abel Gómez	Sacked	21 December 2024	18th	(Spain) Iñigo Vélez	22 December 2024
Alcoyano	(Spain) Juli Cerdá	Demoted to assistant manager	26 December 2024	14th	(Spain) Vicente Mir	26 December 2024
Marbella	(Spain) Fran Beltrán	Sacked	20 January 2025	15th	(Spain) Abel Segovia	21 January 2025
Intercity	(Spain) Mario Simón	Sacked	27 January 2025	20th	(Spain) José Vicente Lledó	27 January 2025
Atlético Sanluqueño	(Spain) Mario Fuentes	Return to sporting director role	9 February 2025	19th	(Spain) José María Salmerón	9 February 2025
Marbella	(Spain) Abel Segovia	Sacked	25 March 2025	18th	(Spain) Carlos de Lerma	25 March 2025
Alcoyano	(Spain) Vicente Mir	Resigned	13 April 2025	19th	(Spain) Luis Miguel Garrido	16 April 2025
Recreativo	(Spain) Iñigo Vélez	Sacked	23 April 2025	18th	(Spain) Raúl Galbarro	23 April 2025
Atlético Sanluqueño	(Spain) José María Salmerón	Sacked	3 May 2025	17th	(Spain) José Herrera	4 May 2025
Fuenlabrada	(Spain) Diego Nogales	Sacked	13 May 2025	18th	(Spain) Rubén Anuarbe	13 May 2025

==== League table ====
Pos	Team	Pld	W	D	L	GF	GA	GD	Pts	Qualification
1	Ceuta (C, P)	38	17	16	5	46	35	+11	67	Promotion to Segunda División and qualification for the Copa del Rey
2	Murcia	38	18	10	10	47	31	+16	64	Qualification for the promotion play-offs and Copa del Rey
3	Ibiza	38	18	9	11	51	33	+18	63	Qualification for the promotion play-offs and Copa del Rey
4	Mérida	38	15	13	10	52	52	0	58 (Note: Mérida finished ahead of Antequera on head-to-head points: Antequera 1–1 Mérida, Mérida 3–0 Antequera)	Qualification for the promotion play-offs and Copa del Rey
5	Antequera	38	14	16	8	54	49	+5	58	Qualification for the promotion play-offs and Copa del Rey
6	Real Madrid Castilla	38	12	18	8	58	36	+22	54 (Note: Real Madrid Castila finished ahead of Atlético Madrid B on overall goal difference)	
7	Atlético Madrid B	38	13	15	10	42	35	+7	54	
8	Sevilla Atlético	38	14	11	13	40	43	−3	53	
9	Algeciras	38	12	16	10	46	46	0	52	
10	Alcorcón	38	14	9	15	52	51	+1	51	
11	Villarreal B	38	11	16	11	51	41	+10	49	
12	Hércules	38	13	8	17	48	49	−1	47	
13	Betis Deportivo	38	11	13	14	44	59	−15	46 (Note: Head-to-head points: Betis Deportivo 10 pts, Atlético Sanluqueño 5 pts, Marbella 3 pts)	
14	Atlético Sanluqueño	38	10	16	12	41	51	−10	46	
15	Marbella	38	12	10	16	51	58	−7	46	
16	Fuenlabrada (R)	38	10	13	15	43	48	−5	43 (Note: Fuenlabrada finished ahead of Yeclano on head-to-head points: Yeclano 1–2 Fuenlabrada, Fuenlabrada 2–1 Yeclano)	Relegation to Segunda Federación
17	Yeclano (R)	38	9	16	13	36	34	+2	43	Relegation to Segunda Federación
18	Alcoyano (R)	38	10	12	16	32	47	−15	42	Relegation to Segunda Federación
19	Recreativo (R)	38	7	16	15	32	52	−20	37	Relegation to Segunda Federación
20	Intercity (R)	38	8	11	19	37	53	−16	35	Relegation to Segunda Federación

Rules for classification: 1) points; 2) head-to-head points; 3) head-to-head goal difference; 4) goal difference; 5) number of goals scored
(Note: Head-to-head record is used only after all the matches between the teams in question have been played)
(C) Champions; (P) Promoted; (R) Relegated

==== Results ====
Home \ Away	ADA	ALY	ALG	ANT	ATM	ASL	BET	CEU	FUE	HER	IBI	INT	MAR	MER	MUR	RMC	REC	SEV	VIL	YEC
Alcorcón	—	0–0	1–1	1–2	2–3	3–1	1–2	0–0	2–1	4–1	1–2	3–0	3–1	2–2	2–1	2–1	1–0	2–2	2–1	2–0
Alcoyano	2–1	—	1–1	1–1	0–0	0–2	0–0	1–1	2–4	1–2	1–0	2–1	2–1	2–3	0–3	0–0	0–0	1–1	0–2	0–0
Algeciras	2–0	2–1	—	1–1	1–0	1–1	2–2	2–0	2–1	2–3	0–0	1–0	1–3	1–1	1–1	1–4	0–0	1–1	1–1	1–0
Antequera	1–0	1–0	1–3	—	2–2	1–0	4–1	2–2	3–4	4–3	2–0	1–1	3–1	1–1	2–1	0–0	1–1	2–2	2–0	0–1
Atlético Madrid B	2–1	2–0	1–1	0–1	—	0–1	0–0	1–1	2–0	1–0	0–0	4–1	3–2	1–0	2–1	1–1	0–0	0–1	1–0	0–0
Atlético Sanluqueño	1–2	0–3	2–2	4–2	1–0	—	0–2	0–0	2–1	1–1	0–0	1–0	1–1	0–3	0–0	2–2	1–1	0–1	1–1	1–0
Betis Deportivo	1–2	4–0	1–1	1–2	0–2	0–2	—	0–0	1–1	2–1	1–3	0–3	2–1	0–4	1–2	1–3	3–1	1–0	0–3	2–0
Ceuta	0–2	1–0	2–0	2–2	2–1	2–2	5–1	—	1–0	1–1	3–1	0–2	3–1	1–0	4–2	2–1	1–0	1–0	1–1	0–0
Fuenlabrada	0–0	0–2	3–0	0–0	0–1	2–2	2–1	1–2	—	2–1	1–0	1–2	1–1	1–1	0–0	2–2	4–1	0–1	0–0	2–1
Hércules	2–0	1–0	1–2	1–0	1–2	2–3	5–1	2–0	1–0	—	3–2	1–1	2–1	0–0	2–0	1–1	1–2	1–0	0–2	2–2
Ibiza	2–0	1–0	0–1	5–3	1–1	4–2	1–2	5–0	2–1	1–1	—	0–2	2–0	3–0	1–2	0–0	0–0	3–0	1–1	2–1
Intercity	0–2	0–2	0–1	0–1	1–1	1–2	1–1	1–2	1–3	1–0	0–1	—	0–0	3–1	0–1	2–2	1–1	4–2	2–2	1–1
Marbella	3–3	0–2	3–1	2–0	2–0	0–0	2–2	0–1	1–1	1–2	2–1	2–1	—	1–0	1–4	1–0	3–1	4–1	0–2	0–3
Mérida	2–1	2–2	1–0	3–0	2–2	3–2	1–1	1–1	2–1	2–1	1–0	2–1	4–2	—	1–4	0–0	3–3	2–1	1–1	1–0
Murcia	3–1	0–1	2–1	0–0	1–1	0–0	0–1	1–1	2–0	1–0	0–2	1–1	0–0	2–0	—	3–1	3–0	0–2	1–0	0–1
Real Madrid Castilla	2–1	2–0	1–1	1–2	1–1	2–0	1–1	0–1	4–0	1–0	0–1	5–0	3–2	6–0	0–0	—	2–1	0–0	2–2	1–1
Recreativo	1–0	1–1	3–2	0–0	2–1	0–0	0–2	1–1	1–1	2–1	0–0	1–0	1–3	0–1	0–1	1–4	—	2–2	3–3	1–0
Sevilla Atlético	1–1	3–0	1–0	2–2	1–0	5–2	0–0	0–0	0–0	1–0	0–1	1–0	0–1	1–0	1–2	1–0	2–0	—	2–1	1–4
Villarreal B	4–0	3–0	0–3	1–1	3–2	1–1	2–2	0–1	1–1	2–1	1–2	0–0	1–1	3–0	0–1	1–1	1–0	3–0	—	0–1
Yeclano	1–1	1–2	2–2	1–1	1–1	2–0	1–1	0–0	0–1	0–0	0–1	1–2	1–1	1–1	0–1	1–1	2–0	2–0	3–1	—

Updated to match(es) played on 17 May 2025. Source:
Legend: Blue = home team win; Yellow = draw; Red = away team win.

==== Top scorers ====
As of 24 May 2025

Rank	Player	Club	Goal
1	(Spain) Gonzalo García	Real Madrid Castilla	25
2	(Cameroon) Etta Eyong	Villarreal B	17
3	(Ukraine) Vladyslav Kopotun	Alcorcón	13
4	(Spain) Liberto Beltrán	Mérida	13
5	(Spain) Javi Eslava	Mérida	12

== Final ==
The winners of the two regular season groups will face off in a two-leg final to determine the overall champion.

28 May 2025
20:00 UTC+2

Cultural Leonesa	2–2	Ceuta
Escobar 44'; Ruiz 90'	Report	Hernández 9'; Almenara 73'

Estadio Reino de León, León
Referee: Alexandre Alemán Pérez

31 May 2025
20:00 UTC+2

Ceuta	4–3	Cultural Leonesa
Escudero 16'; Aquino 47' (pen.); Zalazar 51'; Rodri 90+2'	Report	Samanes 4'; Escobar 18'; Chacón 34'

Estadio Alfonso Murube, Ceuta
Referee: Abraham Domínguez Cervantes

Ceuta win 6–5 on aggregate and were therefore crowned 2024–25 Primera Federación champions.

== Attendances ==
The top 10 clubs with the highest average home attendance:

#	Club	Average
1	Real Murcia	13,746
2	Hércules	9,218
3	Leonesa	7,754
4	Recreativo de Huelva	6,937
5	Gimnàstic de Tarragona	6,395
6	Ponferradina	5,786
7	Salamanca	3,987
8	Ceuta	3,721
9	Barakaldo	3,112
10	Mérida	3,066

== See also ==
- 2024–25 La Liga
- 2024–25 Segunda División
- 2024–25 Segunda Federación
- 2024–25 Tercera Federación
