= Pablo Álvarez =

Pablo Álvarez may refer to:

- Pablo Álvarez (footballer, born 1980), Spanish footballer
- Pablo Álvarez (footballer, born 1992), Honduran footballer
- Pablo Álvarez (footballer, born 1994), Spanish retired footballer and manager
- Pablo Álvarez (footballer, born 1997), Spanish footballer
- Pablo Álvarez (Argentine footballer) (born 1984), Argentine footballer
- Pablo Álvarez (Uruguayan footballer) (born 1985), Uruguayan footballer
- Pablo Álvarez (German footballer) (born 1988), German footballer on List of German football transfers summer 2011
- Pablo Álvarez (sport shooter) (born 1978), Argentine sport shooter
- Pablo Gómez Álvarez (born 1946), Mexican politician
- Pablo Álvarez Fernández, Spanish aeronautical engineer and astronaut.
