= Dani Fernández (footballer, born 1993) =

Spanish football manager (born 1993)

Personal information
- Full name: Daniel Fernández Hermógenes
- Date of birth: 24 May 1993 (age 33)
- Place of birth: Vilamalla, Spain
- Position: Midfielder

Team information
- Current team: Intercity (assistant)

Youth career
- Figueres
- Badalona

Senior career*
Years	Team	Apps	(Gls)
2012–2013	Gramenet B		
2013	Gramenet	1	(0)
2013–2014	Masnou	5	(0)
2014–2015	Castelldefels	10	(0)
2015–2018	Vista Alegre	23	(2)
Total		39	(2)

Managerial career
- 2015–2017: Vista Alegre (youth)
- 2021–2022: United Arab Emirates U21 (assistant)
- 2023–2024: Intercity (assistant)
- 2024: Intercity
- 2024–: Intercity (assistant)
- * Club domestic league appearances and goals

Daniel "Dani" Fernández Hermógenes (born 24 May 1993) is a Spanish retired footballer who played as a midfielder, and the current assistant manager of CF Intercity.

== Playing career ==
Born in Vilamalla, Girona, Catalonia, Fernández represented UE Figueres and CF Badalona as a youth. He made his senior debut with UDA Gramenet's reserves in the Primera Catalana in 2012, before making his first team debut on 17 March 2013, in a 1–1 Tercera División away draw against UE Rubí.

In 2013, Fernández moved to CD Masnou also in the fourth division, but featured rarely. He joined UE Castelldefels in the same category in the following year, but moved to UD Vista Alegre in the fifth level in 2015. He retired in 2018, aged 25.

== Managerial career ==
While playing for Vista Alegre, Fernández was also a manager of their youth categories. In 2017, he moved to FC Barcelona and worked as a performance analyst in the Juvenil squad.

In March 2021, Fernández moved abroad and became an assistant of the United Arab Emirates national under-21 team. He returned to his home country in April 2023, after becoming Alejandro Sandroni's assistant at Primera Federación side CF Intercity.

On 24 September 2024, Fernández was named manager of Intercity, after Sandroni was sacked. On his senior debut as manager five days later, his side drew 1–1 at Antequera CF.

On 20 November 2024, however, Fernández returned to his previous assistant role, after the appointment of Mario Simón.

== Managerial statistics ==
As of 22 November 2024

Managerial record by team and tenure
Team	Nat	From	To	Record								Ref
Team	Nat	From	To	G	W	D	L	GF	GA	GD	Win %	Ref
Intercity	(Spain)	24 September 2024	20 November 2024	7	1	2	4	6	13	−7	14.29	
Total				7	1	2	4	6	13	−7	14.29	—
