= Kopotun =

Kopotun (Cyrillic: Копотун) is an East Slavic surname derived from the archaic nickname копотун that means "procrastinator", "dawdler", "clumsy", slow-poker", etc. Notable people with the surname include:

- Denis Kopotun (born 1996), Canadian YouTuber
- Vladyslav Kopotun (born 2000), Ukrainian footballer with international career
