= Adrián Hernández (football manager) =

Spanish football manager (born 1981)

Personal information
- Full name: Adrián Hernández Abenza
- Date of birth: 30 August 1981 (age 45)
- Place of birth: Murcia, Spain

Team information
- Current team: Águilas (manager)

Managerial career
- Years: Team
- 2014–2019: Churra
- 2019–2021: Murcia
- 2021–2025: Yeclano
- 2025–: Águilas

Adrián Hernández Abenza (born 30 August 1981) is a Spanish football manager, who is currently in charge of Águilas FC.

== Career ==
Born in Murcia, Hernández was never a footballer during his youths; he graduated in business administration and journalism, and also had a degree in business science with MBAs in marketing and pedagogy. He began his managerial career with EDMF Churra in 2014, with the club in the Primera Autonómica de Murcia; in his first years, he also shared his manager role with his work as a teacher.

Hernández achieved promotion with Churra in his first season as manager, taking the club to Tercera División for the first time ever. On 3 June 2019, after missing out promotion in the last two consecutive play-offs, he was appointed manager of Real Murcia CF in Segunda División B.

Hernández won the 2019 Copa Federación de España with the Pimentoneros, and renewed his contract for a further campaign on 5 May 2020. The following 15 February, however, he was sacked after a poor run of results.

On 8 June 2021, Hernández replaced Alejandro Sandroni at the helm of Tercera División RFEF side Yeclano Deportivo. On 18 May of the following year, after achieving promotion as champions of their group, he agreed to a one-year contract extension.

On 17 June 2023, after narrowly missing out a play-off spot in the season, Hernández renewed his link for a further year. On 20 June of the following year, after achieving promotion via the play-offs to the Primera Federación, he agreed to another one-year contract extension until June 2025.

On 3 June 2025, after suffering relegation, Hernández left Yeclano, and was named manager of fellow fourth division side Águilas FC two days later. On 9 June 2026, after leading the club to their first-ever promotion to the third division, he renewed his link for a further year.

== Managerial statistics ==
As of 8 November 2026

Managerial record by team and tenure
Team	Nat	From	To	Record								Ref
Team	Nat	From	To	G	W	D	L	GF	GA	GD	Win %	Ref
Churra	(Spain)	1 July 2014	3 June 2019	192	82	48	62	270	220	+50	42.71	
Murcia	(Spain)	3 June 2019	15 February 2021	50	20	14	16	59	49	+10	40.00	
Yeclano	(Spain)	8 June 2021	3 June 2025	151	69	46	36	204	126	+78	45.70	
Águilas	(Spain)	5 June 2025	Present	50	21	15	14	60	46	+14	42.00	
Total				443	192	123	128	593	441	+152	43.34	—

== Honours ==
Murcia

- Copa Federación de España: 2019
