= Sergi Milà =

Spanish football manager (born 1982)

Personal information
- Full name: Sergi Milà Herrero
- Date of birth: 8 June 1982 (age 44)
- Place of birth: Cerdanyola del Vallès, Spain

Team information
- Current team: Barcelona (staff)

Youth career
- Sants

Senior career*
Years	Team	Apps	(Gls)
- Sants

Managerial career
- 2005–2006: Sants (assistant)
- 2006–2021: Barcelona (youth)
- 2021–2022: Cerdanyola B
- 2022–2023: Barberà Andalucía
- 2025: Barcelona B
- * Club domestic league appearances and goals

Sergi Milà Herrero (born 8 June 1982) is a Spanish football manager and former player.

== Playing career ==
Born in Cerdanyola del Vallès, Barcelona, Catalonia, Milà played for the youth sides of Sants, and managed to appear with the first team squad.

== Coaching career ==
After being an assistant manager of Sants, Milà joined the structure of Barcelona in 2001, as a member of their football schools. In 2006, he was fully incorporated into the club's structure, after being appointed manager of the Benjamín A squad.

Milà coached several youth sides of Barça before being named at the helm of the Juvenil A team on 24 February 2021, replacing Franc Artiga. Later in that year, he became a youth coordinator and methodology director after Óscar López took over the Juvenil squad, and aside from working at Barcelona, also managed Cerdanyola's reserves in the Segona Catalana and subsequently Barberà Andalucía in the Tercera Catalana, achieving promotion with the latter.

On 25 February 2025, Milà was named manager of Barcelona B, with his antecessor Albert Sánchez being moved to the club's technical structure. On 30 May, after suffering relegation, he was replaced by Juliano Belletti and moved to the role of youth technical coordinator.
