= Albert Carbó =

Spanish football manager (born 1990)

Personal information
- Full name: Albert Carbó Benavent
- Date of birth: 8 August 1990 (age 36)
- Place of birth: Peralada, Spain
- Positions: Defender; midfielder

Youth career
- Peralada
- 2008–2009: Girona

Senior career*
Years	Team	Apps	(Gls)
2009–2012	Peralada		
2012–2013	Roses		

Managerial career
- 2015–2018: Peralada (youth)
- 2018–2019: Figueres (youth)
- 2019–2021: Peralada
- 2021–2022: Olot
- 2024–2025: Real Unión
- * Club domestic league appearances and goals

Albert Carbó Benavent (born 8 August 1990) is a Spanish retired footballer who played as either a defender or a midfielder.

== Playing career ==
Born in Peralada, Girona, Catalonia, Carbó was a youth product of Girona FC. In 2009, after finishing his formation, he returned to his hometown and joined CF Peralada in the Primera Catalana.

In 2012, Carbó moved to AE Roses, but retired shortly after in 2013.

== Managerial career ==
After retiring and spending a period in Denmark with Esbjerg fB, Carbó returned to Peralada and started working as manager of the Cadete squad in 2015. In May 2018, he moved to UE Figueres as a youth coordinator, before being later named manager of the Juvenil B side.

On 3 June 2019, Carbó returned to Peralada after being appointed manager of the main squad in Tercera División. He renewed his contract until 2022 on 11 February of the following year, but opted to leave on 15 June 2021, after avoiding relegation.

On 16 June 2021, Carbó was named at the helm of UE Olot in Tercera División RFEF. On 29 March of the following year, after a 2–1 loss to former club Peralada which took the club out of the first position, he was sacked.

In January 2023, Carbó moved to England and joined Unai Emery's staff at Aston Villa, as a coach. On 4 December 2024, he returned to managerial duties after being named Mikel Llorente's replacement at Primera Federación side Real Unión.

On 30 May 2025, after suffering relegation, Carbó left Real Unión.

== Managerial statistics ==
As of 24 May 2025

Managerial record by team and tenure
Team	Nat	From	To	Record								Ref
Team	Nat	From	To	G	W	D	L	GF	GA	GD	Win %	Ref
Peralada	(Spain)	3 June 2019	15 June 2021	58	24	17	17	69	56	+13	41.38	
Olot	(Spain)	16 June 2021	29 March 2022	28	15	6	7	46	28	+18	53.57	
Real Unión	(Spain)	4 December 2024	30 May 2025	23	8	3	12	28	31	−3	34.78	
Total				109	47	26	36	143	115	+28	43.12	—
