= Raúl Galbarro =

Spanish football manager

Personal information
- Full name: Raúl Galbarro Gutiérrez
- Date of birth: (age 51–52)
- Place of birth: Seville, Spain

Team information
- Current team: Recreativo B (manager)

Managerial career
- Years: Team
- Altair (youth)
- Marinaleda (youth)
- Nervión (youth)
- Betis (youth)
- 2021–2022: Atlético Central B
- 2022–2024: Córdoba (youth)
- 2024: Utrera (youth)
- 2024–2025: Recreativo B
- 2025: Recreativo
- 2025–: Recreativo B

Raúl Galbarro Gutiérrez is a Spanish football manager, who is currently in charge of Atlético Onubense.

== Career ==
Born in Seville, Andalusia, Galbarro worked as a primary school teacher at Colegio de Fomento Tabladilla in his hometown, and later became a manager with the youth sides of CD Altair, UD Marinaleda, AD Nervión and Real Betis. On 5 August 2021, he joined CA Central as the manager of the reserve team in Tercera Andaluza.

On 22 February 2022, Galbarro left Central to join Córdoba CF, as a manager of the Cadete A squad. He moved to the Juvenil B team in June, but left the club in 2024 and later joined CD Utrera as manager of the Cadete team.

On 23 December 2024, Galbarro was appointed manager of Recreativo de Huelva's reserves in Tercera Federación. The following 23 April, he became the main squad's third manager of the campaign, after Iñigo Vélez was sacked.

On 1 June 2025, after suffering relegation, Galbarro returned to his role as manager of the B-team.

== Managerial statistics ==
As of 25 April 2025

Managerial record by team and tenure
Team	Nat	From	To	Record								Ref
Team	Nat	From	To	G	W	D	L	GF	GA	GD	Win %	Ref
Atlético Central B	(Spain)	5 August 2021	22 February 2022	18	12	1	5	58	28	+30	66.67	
Recreativo B	(Spain)	23 December 2024	23 April 2025	14	8	4	2	19	8	+11	57.14	
Recreativo	(Spain)	23 April 2025	present	0	0	0	0	0	0	+0	—	
Total				32	20	5	7	77	36	+41	62.50	—
