= Juli (footballer) =

Spanish footballer (born 1981)

Personal information
- Full name: Julián Cerdá Vicente
- Date of birth: 9 August 1981 (age 45)
- Place of birth: Alcoy, Spain
- Height: 1.70 m (5 ft 7 in)
- Position: Attacking midfielder

Team information
- Current team: Alcoyano (technical secretary)

Youth career
- Alcoyano

Senior career*
Years	Team	Apps	(Gls)
2001	Alcoyano		
2002–2004	Alicante	76	(15)
2004–2005	Castellón	34	(2)
2005–2007	Benidorm	69	(15)
2007–2009	Poli Ejido	78	(9)
2009–2010	Elche	38	(6)
2010–2012	Rayo Vallecano	27	(1)
2011–2012	→ Asteras Tripolis (loan)	18	(0)
2012–2014	Alcorcón	75	(14)
2014–2016	Alavés	72	(10)
2016–2017	Córdoba	31	(3)
2017–2019	Hércules	66	(4)
2019–2022	Alcoyano	63	(4)
2022–2023	Ontinyent 1931	31	(7)
Total		678	(90)

Managerial career
- 2020–2021: Ciudad Alcoy
- 2023–2024: Alcoyano (assistant)
- 2024: Alcoyano
- 2025: Alcoyano (assistant)
- * Club domestic league appearances and goals

Julián Cerdá Vicente (born 9 August 1981), known as Juli, is a Spanish former professional footballer who played as an attacking midfielder. He is currently technical secretary of Alcoyano.

He appeared in 284 Segunda División matches over eight seasons, scoring a total of 39 goals for six clubs.

== Playing career ==
Born in Alcoy, Province of Alicante, Juli began his career with hometown's CD Alcoyano in the Tercera División. In the following three seasons he played with two clubs in the Segunda División B, achieving promotion in 2005 with CD Castellón. He stayed in that tier nonetheless, representing Benidorm CF and scoring a career-best eight goals in 33 games in 2006–07.

In the 2007–08 campaign, at already 26, Juli made his Segunda División debut, with Polideportivo Ejido. He only missed only one league match out of 42 in his first year and netted on five occasions, but the Andalusians were relegated.

Juli returned to the second tier for 2009–10, helping Elche CF to contend for promotion until the last weeks of competition – eventually ranking sixth – with the player scoring six goals. In the ensuing summer he signed for Rayo Vallecano, starting in eight of the league games he appeared in (totalling 894 minutes) as the Madrid outskirts side finished second and returned to La Liga after eight years.

Juli subsequently represented Asteras Tripolis FC (Super League Greece), AD Alcorcón and Deportivo Alavés. With the latter team, he achieved another promotion to the top flight in 2016, being ever-present with 40 appearances and four goals.

On 28 June 2016, Juli terminated his contract with the Basque club and signed for Córdoba CF the following month. He joined third-division Hércules CF in July 2017, before returning to Alcoyano in September 2019.

On 22 July 2022, Juli moved to amateurs Ontinyent 1931 CF. He retired after helping in the team's first-ever promotion to Tercera Federación and immediately went back to Alcoyano, now as assistant coach.

== Coaching career ==
Juli was part of Vicente Parras' staff at Alcoyano. On 15 November 2024, he was appointed head coach after the former's dismissal; one month later, however, he returned to his previous role to make way for Vicente Mir.

On 22 March 2025, Juli became the club's technical secretary following the arrival of Luis Miguel Garrido as assistant.

== Honours ==
Alavés

- Segunda División: 2015–16
