= José Vicente Lledó =

Spanish footballer and manager

Personal information
- Full name: José Vicente Lledó Samper
- Date of birth: 14 December 1971 (age 54)
- Place of birth: Alicante, Spain
- Height: 1.80 m (5 ft 11 in)
- Position: Centre-back

Team information
- Current team: Intercity (manager)

Youth career
- Hércules

Senior career*
Years	Team	Apps	(Gls)
1990–1999	Hércules	214	(10)
1992–1993	→ Mutxamel (loan)		
1999–2000	Recreativo	12	(0)
2000–2002	Hércules	26	(1)
2002–2003	Torrellano		

Managerial career
- 2003: Hércules (assistant)
- 2003–2009: Hércules (youth)
- 2009–2010: Torrellano (youth)
- 2010–2011: Torrellano (assistant)
- 2011: Jove Español
- 2011–2012: Kelme (youth)
- 2013–2019: Hércules B
- 2019–2020: Intercity
- 2020: Intercity (caretaker)
- 2021–2022: Alicante
- 2022–2023: Hércules (youth)
- 2023–2025: Acero (assistant)
- 2025–: Intercity
- * Club domestic league appearances and goals

José Vicente Lledó Samper (born 14 December 1971) is a Spanish football manager and former player who played as a central defender. He is the current manager of CF Intercity.

== Playing career ==
Born in Alicante, Valencian Community, Lledó grew in local Hércules CF's youth system, going on to represent the club in all three major levels of Spanish football and appear in more than 250 official matches in the process. During his 13-year career he also played for amateurs Mutxamel CF, Recreativo de Huelva of Segunda División and Torrellano CF in Tercera División.

Lledó contributed with 34 appearances (33 starts, nearly 3,000 minutes of action) and three goals in the 1995–96 season as his main side won the league championship and returned to La Liga after an absence of ten years. He made his debut in the competition on 1 September 1996, playing the full 90 minutes in a 2–1 home win against CF Extremadura, and was again first-choice as the campaign ended in immediate relegation back.

== Coaching career ==
Lledó worked as head coach exclusively at amateur level. With Hércules, he began as assistant to former club teammate Josip Višnjić in 2002–03, and also had spells as youth and B-team coach. Lledó also managed FC Jove Español San Vicente.
