= Luis Garrido (disambiguation) =

Luis Garrido (born 1990), Honduran football player.

Luis Garrido may also refer to:

== Politics ==
- Luis B. Garrido Ampuero, Chilean politician, governor of El Loa
- Luis Garrido Juaristi in list of mayors of Madrid (1918–1920)
- Luis Javier Garrido (1941–2012), Mexican political analyst

== Others ==
- Luis Garrido (sport shooter), Puerto Rican shooter
- Luis Fernando Garrido, Colombian discus thrower in 1983 South American Junior Championships in Athletics and athletics at the 1989 Bolivarian Games
- Luis de Garrido (born 1967), Spanish architect
- José Luis Garrido, got 20th Goya Awards for best original score in 2006
- Juan Luis Suárez Garrido, Spanish guitarist of El Sueño de Morfeo
- Luis Miguel Garrido, Spanish football manager and former player
- Luis Ramón Garrido, Mexican badminton player
