= Santi Samanes =

Spanish footballer (born 1995)

Personal information
- Full name: Santiago Samanes Bonito
- Date of birth: 28 July 1995 (age 31)
- Place of birth: Berriozar, Spain
- Height: 1.76 m (5 ft 9 in)
- Position: Winger

Team information
- Current team: Concordia Chiajna
- Number: 77

Youth career
- San Agustín
- 2003–2011: Osasuna
- 2011–2012: Lagunak
- 2012–2013: Pamplona

Senior career*
Years	Team	Apps	(Gls)
2013–2014	Pamplona	33	(8)
2014–2015	Peña Sport	24	(1)
2015–2016	Tudelano	27	(2)
2016–2018	Valladolid B	59	(8)
2018–2019	Coruxo	28	(4)
2019–2020	Arka Gdynia	3	(0)
2020–2022	Tudelano	36	(5)
2022	Linense	14	(0)
2022–2023	Logroñés	37	(6)
2023–2025	Cultural Leonesa	29	(5)
2025–2026	Lugo	28	(1)
2026–	Concordia Chiajna	6	(1)
- * Club domestic league appearances and goals as of 1 November 2026

Santiago "Santi" Samanes Bonito (born 28 July 1995) is a Spanish professional footballer who plays as a winger for Liga II club Concordia Chiajna.

== Career ==
Born in Berriozar, Navarre, Samanes began his career with local side Colegio San Agustín before joining the youth sides of CA Osasuna at the age of eight. After leaving the club at the age of 16, he subsequently represented SD Lagunak and CD Pamplona, making his senior debut with the latter in Tercera División during the 2012–13 season.

On 17 June 2014, after a period on trial at Bilbao Athletic, Samanes signed for Peña Sport FC also in the fourth division. On 3 July of the following year, he was announced at Segunda División B side CD Tudelano.

On 30 June 2016, Samanes agreed to a two-year contract with Real Valladolid, being assigned to the reserves also in division three. On 4 July 2018, after failing to make a breakthrough in the first team, he moved to Coruxo FC in the same tier.

On 13 June 2019, Samanes moved abroad for the first time in his career, and signed a two-year deal with Polish Ekstraklasa side Arka Gdynia. He made his professional debut on 7 February of the following year, coming on as a second-half substitute for Nemanja Mihajlović in a 1–0 home loss to KS Cracovia.

On 10 July 2020, after being rarely used, Samanes left Arka and returned to Tudelano late in the month. On 24 January 2022, he signed for Primera División RFEF side Real Balompédica Linense on an 18-month deal.

On 4 July 2022, Samanes moved to fellow third division side SD Logroñés, where he quickly established himself as a regular starter. On 26 June 2023, he moved to fellow league team Cultural y Deportiva Leonesa.

Initially a first-choice, Samanes suffered a knee injury in December 2023 which led him to miss the remainder of the campaign. Despite being sidelined, he renewed his link with Cultu for a further year on 8 February 2024.

== Honours ==
Peña Sport

- Tercera División: 2014–15

Tudelano

- Segunda División B: 2020–21 (Subgroup 2B)

Cultural Leonesa

- Primera Federación: 2024–25
