= Diego Nogales =

Spanish football manager (born 1981)

Personal information
- Full name: Diego Nogales Domínguez
- Date of birth: 5 October 1981 (age 45)
- Place of birth: Madrid, Spain

Managerial career
- Years: Team
- 2008–2012: Canillas (youth)
- 2012–2013: Canillas (assistant)
- 2013–2014: Canillas (youth)
- 2014–2016: Santa Ana (youth)
- 2016: Santa Ana
- 2016–2020: Real Madrid (youth)
- 2020–2022: Unión Adarve
- 2022: Rayo Majadahonda
- 2024: Fuenlabrada (assistant)
- 2024–2025: Fuenlabrada
- 2025: Talavera

Diego Nogales Domínguez (born 5 October 1981) is a Spanish football manager.

== Career ==
Born in Madrid, Nogales began his career at CD Canillas in 2008, as an assistant of the Alevín squad. He worked as an assistant in the main squad during the 2012–13 season, before becoming a manager of the Cadete squad.

In 2014, Nogales moved to DAV Santa Ana as a manager of the Juvenil squad, before taking over the first team in January 2016. In August, he joined Álvaro Benito's staff at Real Madrid's Juvenil C team.

In the middle of 2018, Nogales joined the Cadete A squad, now as an assistant of Raúl, before becoming the manager of the Cadete B team in March 2019. On 23 July 2020, he left La Fábrica after being appointed manager of AD Unión Adarve in Tercera División.

Nogales led the side to a promotion to Segunda División RFEF in his first year, but left the club in June 2022 after missing out another promotion in the play-offs. On 18 June of that year, he was named at the helm of Primera Federación side CF Rayo Majadahonda, but was dismissed on 3 October.

In April 2024, Nogales joined Alfredo Sánchez's staff at CF Fuenlabrada. On 22 October, he became the caretaker manager after Sánchez was sacked, before being confirmed as manager on 5 November. On 13 May 2025, however, he was himself dismissed with two before the end of the season.

On 26 June 2025, Nogales was announced as manager of CF Talavera de la Reina also in division three. He was relieved of his duties on 2 December, after five winless matches.

== Managerial statistics ==
As of 30 November 2025

Managerial record by team and tenure
| Team | Nat | From | To | Record | | | | | | | | Ref |
| Team | Nat | From | To | G | W | D | L | GF | GA | GD | Win % | Ref |
|---|---|---|---|---|---|---|---|---|---|---|---|---|
| Santa Ana | (Spain) | 2 January 2016 | 30 June 2016 | 20 | 16 | 1 | 3 | 55 | 12 | +43 | 80.00 | |
| Unión Adarve | (Spain) | 23 July 2020 | 5 June 2022 | 65 | 35 | 18 | 12 | 108 | 66 | +42 | 53.85 | |
| Rayo Majadahonda | (Spain) | 18 June 2022 | 3 October 2022 | 6 | 0 | 1 | 5 | 5 | 11 | −6 | 0.00 | |
| Fuenlabrada | (Spain) | 22 October 2024 | 13 May 2025 | 27 | 8 | 9 | 10 | 35 | 35 | +0 | 29.63 | |
| Talavera | (Spain) | 26 June 2025 | 2 December 2025 | 15 | 4 | 3 | 8 | 18 | 19 | −1 | 26.67 | |
| Total | | | | 133 | 63 | 32 | 38 | 221 | 143 | +78 | 47.37 | — |
