= Gonzalo Almenara =

Spanish footballer

Personal information
- Full name: Gonzalo Francisco Almenara Hernández
- Date of birth: 15 May 1997 (age 29)
- Place of birth: Algeciras, Spain
- Height: 1.74 m (5 ft 9 in)
- Position: Right-back

Team information
- Current team: Ibiza

Youth career
- PMD Algeciras
- Cádiz
- 2012–2016: Sevilla

Senior career*
| Years | Team | Apps | (Gls) |
| 2016–2017 | Sevilla C | 35 | (1) |
| 2017–2018 | Linense | 14 | (1) |
| 2018–2019 | Los Barrios | 36 | (4) |
| 2019–2022 | Algeciras | 44 | (4) |
| 2022–2024 | Deinze | 38 | (0) |
| 2025–2026 | Ceuta | 22 | (0) |
| 2026– | Ibiza | 0 | (0) |
- * Club domestic league appearances and goals as of 9 June 2026

Gonzalo Francisco Almenara Hernández (born 15 May 1997) is a Spanish professional footballer who plays as a right-back for UD Ibiza.

== Career ==
Born in Algeciras, Cádiz, Andalusia, Almenara began his career with hometown side Patronato Municipal de Deportes de Algeciras, and played for Cádiz CF before joining the youth categories of Sevilla FC at the age of 15. He made his senior debut with the C-team in Tercera División during the 2016–17 season, before moving to Real Balompédica Linense in Segunda División B on 19 July 2017.

On 8 September 2018, after being sparingly used, Almenara signed for UD Los Barrios in the fourth division. The following 9 July, he agreed to a deal with Algeciras CF back in the third tier.

On 30 June 2022, Almenara moved abroad for the first time in his career, signing a two-year contract with Challenger Pro League side KMSK Deinze. After struggling with a knee injury which sidelined him for six months, he made his professional debut on 21 December, starting in a 2–1 Belgian Cup home loss to SV Zulte Waregem.

Almenara left Deinze in December 2024 after the club went bankrupt, and returned to his home country with Primera Federación side AD Ceuta FC on 28 December. Despite struggling with injuries, he contributed one goal in 12 appearances during the campaign as the club achieved promotion to Segunda División.

On 19 June 2026, after being rarely used, Almenara moved to UD Ibiza in the third division.

== Personal life ==
Almenara's father Paco was also a footballer and a defender. He too played for Algeciras.
