= Iosu Rivas =

Spanish footballer and manager

Personal information
- Full name: Iosu Rivas Carranza
- Date of birth: 20 January 1983 (age 43)
- Place of birth: San Sebastián, Spain
- Height: 1.74 m (5 ft 9 in)
- Position: Right-back

Team information
- Current team: Burgos (assistant)

Youth career
- Real Sociedad

Senior career*
| Years | Team | Apps | (Gls) |
| 2002–2006 | Real Sociedad B | 101 | (0) |
| 2006–2007 | Cartagena | 30 | (0) |
| 2007–2008 | Pontevedra | 16 | (0) |
| 2008–2009 | Ciudad Santiago | 23 | (0) |
| 2009–2010 | Amurrio | | |
| Total | | 170 | (0) |

Managerial career
- 2014–2015: Berio (assistant)
- 2018–2022: Real Sociedad C (assistant)
- 2022–2025: Real Sociedad B (assistant)
- 2025: Real Sociedad B
- 2025: Real Sociedad (assistant)
- 2026–: Burgos (assistant)
- * Club domestic league appearances and goals

Iosu Rivas Carranza (born 20 January 1983) is a Spanish football manager and former player who played as a right-back. He is the current assistant manager of Burgos CF.

== Playing career ==
Rivas was born in San Sebastián, Gipuzkoa, Basque Country, and was a youth product of hometown side Real Sociedad. Promoted to the reserves in Tercera División in 2002, he was a regular starter during the season as the side achieved promotion to Segunda División B. He left the club in January 2006, after failing to make a breakthrough in the first team, and moved to fellow third division side Cartagena.

Rivas played in the third and fourth divisions in the following years, representing Pontevedra, Ciudad Santiago and Amurrio, retiring with the latter in 2010 at the age of 27.

== Coaching career ==
After retiring, Rivas returned to his first club Real Sociedad, working in the Juvenil B squad (named Easo) before becoming an assistant of Iñigo Cortés at farm team Berio in 2014. In 2015, he moved to China to work in the methodology of a project to improve the country's footballing infrastructure, before returning to his home country in the following year to become Mikel Ferradas' assistant at the Txuri-urdin's Infantil side.

In July 2018, Rivas was appointed manager of the Infantil Txiki squad of Real Sociedad, but left the side in December to join Sergio Francisco's staff in the C-team, as his assistant. He followed Sergio Francisco to the B's in 2022, before becoming the manager of the reserve side on 25 April 2025, after Sergio Francisco was promoted to the first team.

On 23 June 2025, after leading Sanse back to Segunda División after a three-year absence, Rivas left the role to join Sergio Francisco's staff in the first team, again as his assistant. He left the club on 13 December, after the manager's dismissal.

== Managerial statistics ==
As of 23 June 2025

Managerial record by team and tenure
| Team | Nat | From | To | Record | | | | | | | | Ref |
| Team | Nat | From | To | G | W | D | L | GF | GA | GD | Win % | Ref |
|---|---|---|---|---|---|---|---|---|---|---|---|---|
| Real Sociedad B | (Spain) | 25 April 2025 | 23 June 2025 | 8 | 4 | 2 | 2 | 11 | 7 | +4 | 50.00 | |
| Total | | | | 8 | 4 | 2 | 2 | 11 | 7 | +4 | 50.00 | — |
