= Joseba Llorente =

Spanish retired footballer (born 1979)

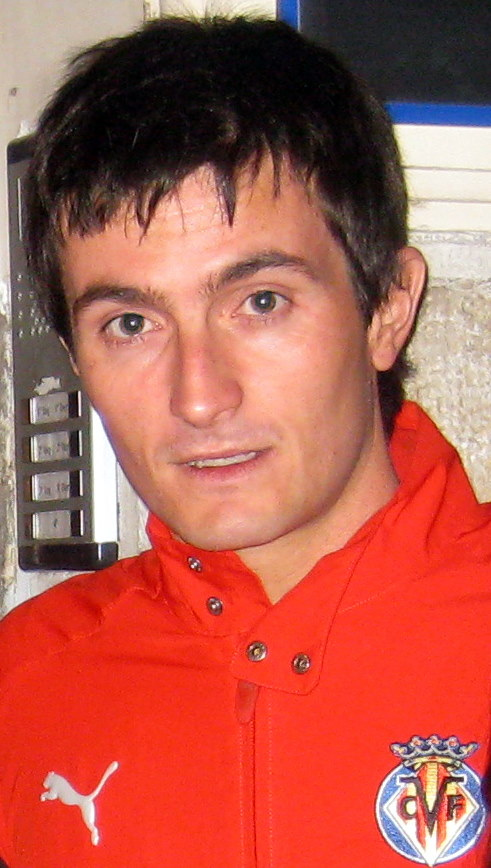
- Llorente as a Villarreal player (2009)

Personal information
- Full name: Joseba Llorente Etxarri
- Date of birth: 24 November 1979 (age 46)
- Place of birth: Hondarribia, Spain
- Height: 1.84 m (6 ft 0 in)
- Position: Centre-forward

Youth career
- Real Sociedad

Senior career*
Years	Team	Apps	(Gls)
1998–2002	Real Sociedad B	64	(26)
1999–2004	Real Sociedad	23	(4)
2000	→ Eibar (loan)	8	(4)
2003–2004	→ Eibar (loan)	33	(4)
2004–2005	Eibar	38	(18)
2005–2008	Valladolid	99	(45)
2008–2010	Villarreal	61	(24)
2010–2013	Real Sociedad	35	(5)
2012–2013	→ Osasuna (loan)	24	(1)
Total		385	(131)

International career
2004–2010	Basque Country	3	(0)
- * Club domestic league appearances and goals

Joseba Llorente Etxarri (born 24 November 1979) is a Spanish former professional footballer who played as a centre-forward.

He amassed La Liga totals of 179 games and 50 goals over ten seasons, representing in the competition Real Sociedad, Valladolid, Villarreal and Osasuna. He added 142 matches and 55 goals in the Segunda División, mainly in service of Eibar.

== Club career ==
Born in Hondarribia, Basque Country, Llorente came through the ranks of Real Sociedad, making his debut for the first team on 3 October 1999 against Real Zaragoza (2–0 away loss). He would however, only total 23 appearances in four seasons, and left in 2003 for another club in his native region, SD Eibar of Segunda División, where he already had served a loan stint early into the 2000–01 campaign.

For 2005–06, Llorente signed for Real Valladolid also in that tier, and scored 12 league goals in his debut campaign. He added 17 the following year to help the team to achieve promotion as champions.

On 20 January 2008, in a match against RCD Espanyol, Llorente broke the Spanish league record for the fastest goal ever scored (7.22 seconds), beating Dario Silva's previous record at 8. He broke through that season aged almost 29, netting 16 times to help them to retain top-flight status, including a hat-trick against Recreativo de Huelva on the 13th.

Llorente agreed a four-year deal with Villarreal CF on 26 May 2008, for an undisclosed fee. He scored his first goal for the club in a 2–1 win at CD Numancia on 21 September. Exactly one month later, he put three past AaB Football in a UEFA Champions League 6–3 home victory.

On 10 March 2009, after just minutes on the pitch, Llorente scored the winner in a 2–1 away defeat of Panathinaikos F.C. in the Champions League quarter-finals' second leg (3–2 aggregate). His first season at Villarreal was highly productive as he scored a squad-best 15 league goals, including two at FC Barcelona in a 3–3 draw on 10 May, postponing the Catalans' title-winning celebrations for a further week.

On 16 June 2010, after another good year with the Valencians, Llorente rejoined Real Sociedad – recently returned to the top tier – penning a four-year contract worth €2.5 million. In his competitive debut, on 29 August, he assisted Xabi Prieto with a backheel for the game's only goal, at home against his former side Villarreal; in mid-January 2011, however, after suffering a back injury, he was sidelined for the remainder of the season.

== Personal life ==
Llorente's younger brother Mikel was a footballer at amateur level. He later worked as a manager.

== Career statistics ==
Appearances and goals by club, season and competition
Club	Season	League			Copa del Rey		Continental		Total	
Club	Season	Division	Apps	Goals	Apps	Goals	Apps	Goals	Apps	Goals
Real Sociedad	1999–00	La Liga	8	1	1	0	–		9	1
Real Sociedad	2000–01	La Liga	9	2	0	0	–		9	2
Real Sociedad	2001–02	La Liga	4	0	0	0	–		4	0
Real Sociedad	2002–03	La Liga	2	1	–		–		2	1
Real Sociedad	Total		23	4	1	0	0	0	24	4
Real Sociedad B	2001–02	Segunda División B	10	2	–		–		10	2
Eibar (loan)	2000–01	Segunda División	8	4	0	0	–		8	4
Eibar (loan)	2003–04	Segunda División	33	4	1	0	–		34	4
Eibar	2004–05	Segunda División	38	18	1	0	–		39	18
Valladolid	2005–06	Segunda División	36	12	1	0	–		37	12
Valladolid	2006–07	Segunda División	27	17	5	1	–		32	18
Valladolid	2007–08	La Liga	36	16	3	1	–		39	17
Valladolid	Total		99	45	9	2	0	0	108	47
Villarreal	2008–09	La Liga	32	15	1	0	7	4	40	19
Villarreal	2009–10	La Liga	29	9	3	0	8	1	40	10
Villarreal	Total		61	24	4	0	15	5	80	29
Real Sociedad	2010–11	La Liga	18	5	2	0	–		20	5
Real Sociedad	2011–12	La Liga	17	0	3	0	–		20	0
Real Sociedad	Total		35	5	5	0	0	0	40	5
Osasuna (loan)	2012–13	La Liga	24	1	3	2	–		27	3
Career total			331	107	24	4	15	5	370	116

== Honours ==
Valladolid

- Segunda División: 2006–07
