= Toni Seligrat =

Spanish football manager (born 1968)

Personal information
- Full name: José Antonio Seligrat Bernal
- Date of birth: 20 October 1968 (age 58)
- Place of birth: Torrent, Spain
- Position: Defensive midfielder

Team information
- Current team: Torrent (manager)

Senior career*
| Years | Team | Apps | (Gls) |
| 1987–1988 | Torrent | | |
| 1988–1991 | Balaguer | | |
| 1991–1992 | Borges Blanques | | |
| 1992–1993 | Lleida B | | |
| 1993–1994 | Fraga | 30 | (3) |
| 1994–1995 | Tremp | | |
| 1995–1996 | Balaguer | | |
| 1996–1997 | Binéfar | 26 | (1) |
| 1997–1998 | Barbastro | 29 | (1) |
| 1998–1999 | Fraga | 22 | (0) |
| 1999–2002 | Alcampell | 55 | (1) |

Managerial career
- 2001–2003: Alcampell
- 2003–2004: Teruel
- 2004–2005: Atlètic Ciutadella
- 2005–2007: Mahonés
- 2007: Aris (assistant)
- 2008–2010: Gandía
- 2010–2012: Olímpic Xàtiva
- 2012–2014: Lleida Esportiu
- 2014–2015: Huracán
- 2016–2017: Alcoyano
- 2017–2019: Sabadell
- 2019–2021: Gimnàstic
- 2021–2022: Alavés B
- 2022–2023: Lleida Esportiu
- 2023–2024: Valencia (assistant)
- 2025: Lugo
- 2025–2026: Torrent
- * Club domestic league appearances and goals

José Antonio "Toni" Seligrat Bernal (born 20 October 1968) is a Spanish retired footballer who played as a defensive midfielder and a current manager. He was most recently in charge of his hometown club Torrent in Segunda Federación.

== Playing career ==
Born in Torrent, Valencian Community, Seligrat never played in any division higher than Tercera División. He began his career with hometown side Torrent CF, and went on to represent CF Balaguer, CF Borges Blanques, UE Lleida's reserves, CF Tremp, UD Fraga (two stints), CD Binéfar, UD Barbastro and UD Alcampell (two stints), where he retired in 2002 at the age of 33.

== Coaching career ==
Immediately after retiring Seligrat took up coaching, being named manager of his last club Alcampell. For the 2003–04 season, he took over CD Teruel in the fourth division, but was sacked in May 2004.

Seligrat was appointed at fourth tier side Atlètic Ciutadella CF in August 2004, moving to fellow league team CF Sporting Mahonés the following June. On 4 June 2007, he left the latter club to join Juan Carlos Oliva's staff at Super League Greece side Aris, but left the club shortly after Oliva was sacked, just a few months later.

Upon returning to Spain, Seligrat was named in charge of CF Gandía in May 2008, and managed to achieve promotion to Segunda División B with the club in 2010. He subsequently left the club for CD Olímpic de Xàtiva, whom he also helped promote to the third division in 2011.

On 18 June 2012, Seligrat was appointed manager of third division side Lleida Esportiu. At the club, he managed to reach the promotion play-offs twice, but was knocked out in both times; he subsequently left the club.

On 24 November 2014, Seligrat took over Huracán Valencia CF, still in the third tier. On 9 October 2015, he resigned, and was appointed in charge of CD Alcoyano the following 20 May.

On 22 June 2017, Seligrat was named manager of CE Sabadell FC, still in the third division. He was sacked by the club on 14 January 2019, after nearly fighting with the club's supporters in his last match in charge.

On 17 November 2019, Seligrat was appointed at Gimnàstic de Tarragona, freshly relegated to the third division. The following 11 June, he renewed his contract with the club until 2021.

Seligrat left Nàstic on 12 May 2021, as his contract ended. On 18 June, he was named in charge of Deportivo Alavés' reserves in Tercera División RFEF.

After achieving promotion to Segunda Federación, Seligrat rejected a new deal offered by the club and left the Miniglorias on 16 June 2022. He returned to Lleida on 28 December. The following 2 February, he left the club and became Voro's assistant at Valencia CF; twelve days later, despite the managerial change to Rubén Baraja, he was kept as an assistant.

Seligat left the Che in June 2024, and returned to managerial duties the following 22 January, taking over CD Lugo in Primera Federación. On 4 May 2025, with the club under threat of relegation, he was sacked.

He was appointed manager of his hometown club Torrent CF on 11 November 2025, with the team sitting bottom in the Group 3 of Segunda Federación After the team was relegated to Tercera Federación, his contract was not extended and he left the club on 15 June 2026.

== Managerial statistics ==
As of match played 10 November 2026

Managerial record by team and tenure
| Team | Nat | From | To | Record | | | | | | | | Ref |
| Team | Nat | From | To | G | W | D | L | GF | GA | GD | Win % | Ref |
|---|---|---|---|---|---|---|---|---|---|---|---|---|
| Alcampell | (Spain) | 15 October 2001 | 30 June 2003 | 65 | 22 | 13 | 30 | 99 | 107 | −8 | 33.85 | |
| Teruel | (Spain) | 1 July 2003 | 10 May 2004 | 35 | 15 | 8 | 12 | 47 | 40 | +7 | 42.86 | |
| Atlètic Ciutadella | (Spain) | 14 August 2004 | 23 June 2005 | 38 | 12 | 10 | 16 | 45 | 53 | −8 | 31.58 | |
| Mahonés | (Spain) | 23 June 2005 | 4 June 2007 | 80 | 36 | 23 | 21 | 103 | 78 | +25 | 45.00 | |
| Gandía | (Spain) | 12 May 2008 | 23 May 2010 | 83 | 37 | 33 | 13 | 101 | 65 | +36 | 44.58 | |
| Olímpic Xàtiva | (Spain) | 23 May 2010 | 18 June 2012 | 85 | 42 | 23 | 20 | 108 | 65 | +43 | 49.41 | |
| Lleida Esportiu | (Spain) | 18 June 2012 | 17 June 2014 | 89 | 40 | 32 | 17 | 124 | 83 | +41 | 44.94 | |
| Huracán | (Spain) | 24 November 2014 | 9 October 2015 | 39 | 18 | 15 | 6 | 49 | 29 | +20 | 46.15 | |
| Alcoyano | (Spain) | 20 May 2016 | 22 June 2017 | 41 | 18 | 14 | 9 | 56 | 38 | +18 | 43.90 | |
| Sabadell | (Spain) | 22 June 2017 | 14 January 2019 | 58 | 16 | 27 | 15 | 54 | 56 | −2 | 27.59 | |
| Gimnàstic | (Spain) | 17 November 2019 | 12 May 2021 | 45 | 18 | 15 | 12 | 63 | 46 | +17 | 40.00 | |
| Alavés B | (Spain) | 18 June 2021 | 20 May 2022 | 38 | 21 | 13 | 4 | 72 | 31 | +41 | 55.26 | |
| Lleida Esportiu | (Spain) | 28 December 2022 | 2 February 2023 | 4 | 1 | 2 | 1 | 3 | 3 | +0 | 25.00 | |
| Lugo | (Spain) | 22 January 2025 | 4 May 2025 | 15 | 6 | 1 | 8 | 17 | 25 | −8 | 40.00 | |
| Torrent | (Spain) | 11 November 2025 | 15 June 2026 | 25 | 6 | 5 | 14 | 27 | 41 | −14 | 24.00 | |
| Total | | | | 740 | 308 | 234 | 198 | 968 | 760 | +208 | 41.62 | — |
