= Mario Fuentes =

Spanish football manager (born 1986)

Personal information
- Full name: Mario Fuentes Bargueño
- Date of birth: 10 July 1986 (age 40)
- Place of birth: Madrid, Spain
- Height: 1.89 m (6 ft 2 in)
- Position: Centre-back

Team information
- Current team: Sanluqueño (sporting director)

Youth career
- Atlético Madrid
- 2003–2005: Rayo Majadahonda

Senior career*
Years	Team	Apps	(Gls)
2005–2007	Colonia Ofigevi		
2007–2012	Leganés	133	(6)
2012–2013	Trival Valderas	5	(0)
2013–2014	Lleida Esportiu	46	(2)
2014–2018	Alcoyano	106	(5)
Total		290	(13)

Managerial career
- 2018–2019: Alcoyano (assistant)
- 2019: Alcoyano
- 2020–2022: SS Reyes (assistant)
- 2024–2025: Sanluqueño
- * Club domestic league appearances and goals

Mario Fuentes Bargueño (born 10 July 1986) is a Spanish retired footballer who played mainly as a centre-back, and the current sporting director of Atlético Sanluqueño CF.

== Playing career ==
Born in Madrid, Fuentes finished his formation with CF Rayo Majadahonda, but made his senior debut with CD Colonia Ofigevi in the Regional Preferente in 2005, achieving immediate promotion to Tercera División. In 2007, he moved to Segunda División B side CD Leganés.

In 2012, Fuentes joined CF Trival Valderas in the fourth division, but returned to the third level the following January after agreeing to a deal with Lleida Esportiu. On 30 June 2014, he signed for CD Alcoyano also in division three.

On 22 June 2018, after four seasons being regularly used, Fuentes retired from football at the age of 32.

== Managerial career ==
Shortly after retiring, Fuentes became Vicente Mir' assistant at his last club Alcoyano. On 27 February 2019, he was named manager of the club after Mir's dismissal, but was in charge in only two defeats in as many matches before being himself replaced by Mario Barrera on 11 March.

On 6 July 2019, Fuentes joined Internacional de Madrid as a sporting director. He subsequently followed manager Marcos Jiménez to UD San Sebastián de los Reyes in the following year, as his assistant.

On 2 May 2022, Fuentes moved to Atlético Sanluqueño CF as a sporting director. On 27 May 2024, he became the club's general director, before being named manager on 30 September, after the dismissal of Aitor Martínez.
