= Sergi Guilló =

Spanish footballer (born 1991)

Personal information
- Full name: Sergi Guilló Barceló
- Date of birth: 23 May 1991 (age 35)
- Place of birth: Elche, Spain
- Height: 1.80 m (5 ft 11 in)
- Position: Midfielder

Team information
- Current team: Murcia (manager)

Youth career
- 2002–2010: Elche

Senior career*
Years	Team	Apps	(Gls)
2010–2015	Elche B	165	(3)
2013	Elche	1	(0)
2015–2016	Murcia	19	(0)
2016–2017	Linares	2	(0)
2017	Recanatese	0	(0)

Managerial career
- 2017–2020: Elche (youth)
- 2020–2021: Orihuela (assistant)
- 2021–2023: Murcia (assistant)
- 2023–2024: Orihuela
- 2024–2025: Mérida
- 2025: Huesca
- 2026–: Murcia
- * Club domestic league appearances and goals

Sergi Guilló Barceló (born 23 May 1991) is a Spanish retired footballer who played as a central midfielder, and the current manager of Real Murcia CF.

== Playing career ==
Guilló was born in Elche, Alicante, Valencian Community. A product of hometown Elche CF's youth system, he made his senior debuts with the reserves in 2010–11 season.

On 8 June 2013 Guilló made his professional debut, playing the last 28 minutes of a 3–1 home win over CD Guadalajara, for Segunda División championship. On 14 July 2014 he renewed his link for a further year.

On 8 July 2015 Guilló moved to Real Murcia in Segunda División B. On 30 August of the following year, he joined fellow league team Linares Deportivo.

In July 2017, Guilló moved abroad for the first time in his career, joining USD Recanatese 1923 of the Italian Serie C, but left the club in August before debuting, returning to his home country due to personal reasons. He retired shortly after, aged just 26.

== Managerial career ==
Shortly after retiring, Guilló was appointed manager of his first club Elche's youth sides. In September 2020, he was named Gerard Albaladejo's assistant at Orihuela CF, before joining Mario Simón's staff at Real Murcia CF the following 18 July, under the same role.

On 12 December 2023, Guilló returned to Orihuela, now being named manager of the side in Segunda Federación. The following 9 June, after narrowly missing out promotion in the play-offs, he left, and took over Primera Federación side Mérida AD three days later.

On 13 June 2025, after missing out promotion in the play-offs, Guilló left Mérida to take over SD Huesca in the second division. On 10 November, however, he was sacked.

On 25 May 2026, Guilló returned to Murcia after nearly ten years, being appointed first team manager.

== Managerial statistics ==
As of 8 November 2025

Managerial record by team and tenure
Team	Nat	From	To	Record								Ref
Team	Nat	From	To	G	W	D	L	GF	GA	GD	Win %	Ref
Orihuela	(Spain)	12 December 2023	9 June 2024	23	13	6	4	27	16	+11	56.52	
Mérida	(Spain)	12 June 2024	13 June 2025	40	16	13	11	53	53	+0	40.00	
Huesca	(Spain)	13 June 2025	10 November 2025	14	5	3	6	15	18	−3	35.71	
Total				77	34	22	21	95	87	+8	44.16	—
