= Javi Rey (footballer, born 1985) =

Spanish football manager

Personal information
- Full name: Javier Rey Pérez
- Date of birth: 13 January 1985 (age 41)
- Place of birth: Ourense, Spain
- Position: Forward

Team information
- Current team: Sant Andreu (manager)

Senior career*
Years	Team	Apps	(Gls)
–2008	Melias		
2008	Sporting Celanova		

Managerial career
- 2009–2010: Melias
- 2010–2011: Barco
- 2011–2013: Nogueira
- 2013–2018: Barco
- 2018–2020: Céltiga
- 2020–2021: Arzúa
- 2021–2022: Barco
- 2022–2024: Arenteiro
- 2024–2025: Ponferradina
- 2025–2026: Cartagena
- 2026–: Sant Andreu
- * Club domestic league appearances and goals

Javier "Javi" Rey Pérez (born 13 January 1985) is a Spanish retired footballer who played as a forward, and is the current manager of UE Sant Andreu.

== Career ==
Born in Ourense, Galicia, Rey played for local sides SD Melias and Sporting Celanova CF before retiring in 2008 at the age of 23, due to a knee injury. Shortly after retiring, he returned to Melias and became their manager in the Primeira Autonómica.

In 2010, Rey was appointed manager of fellow sixth division side CD Barco, but had to leave the club for personal reasons in the following year, and subsequently took over SD Nogueira de Ramuín of the same league.

In 2013, Rey returned to Barco, with the club now in the Preferente Autonómica. He led the side to promotion to Tercera División in 2015, before leaving in May 2018.

On 5 December 2018, Rey was named manager of fellow fourth division side Céltiga FC. He suffered relegation in his first season, and left for CSD Arzúa on 28 May 2020.

On 1 July 2021, Rey returned to Barco for a third spell. On 24 November of the following year, he left the club to take over Segunda Federación side CD Arenteiro, replacing Fran Justo.

On 16 June 2023, after leading Arenteiro to a first-ever promotion to Primera Federación, Rey renewed his contract for a further year. He opted to leave the club on 12 June 2024, and agreed to take over fellow league team SD Ponferradina seven days later.

On 26 June 2025, after missing out promotion in the play-offs, Rey left Ponfe, and took over FC Cartagena now also in division three on 4 July. The following 27 January, following a run of one win in the last five league games, he was sacked by the latter.

28 October 2026, Rey returned to division three after being appointed manager of UE Sant Andreu on a contract until the end of the season with an option for a further year; he replaced sacked Natxo González.

== Managerial statistics ==
As of 14 November 2026

Managerial record by team and tenure
Team	Nat	From	To	Record								Ref
Team	Nat	From	To	G	W	D	L	GF	GA	GD	Win %	Ref
Melias	(Spain)	1 July 2009	30 June 2010	34	20	8	6	59	33	+26	58.82	
Barco	(Spain)	1 July 2010	30 June 2011	34	18	9	7	67	29	+38	52.94	
Nogueira	(Spain)	1 July 2011	30 June 2013	68	36	16	16	131	79	+52	52.94	
Barco	(Spain)	1 July 2013	15 May 2018	190	85	45	60	290	242	+48	44.74	
Céltiga	(Spain)	5 December 2018	28 May 2020	49	21	10	18	74	68	+6	42.86	
Arzúa	(Spain)	28 May 2020	13 April 2021	24	8	8	8	33	24	+9	33.33	
Barco	(Spain)	1 July 2021	24 November 2022	44	19	11	14	64	53	+11	43.18	
Arenteiro	(Spain)	24 November 2022	12 June 2024	64	28	20	16	78	60	+18	43.75	
Ponferradina	(Spain)	19 June 2024	26 June 2025	45	20	11	14	63	48	+15	44.44	
Cartagena	(Spain)	4 July 2025	27 January 2026	23	8	7	8	22	24	−2	34.78	
Sant Andreu	(Spain)	28 October 2026	Present	3	2	1	0	6	2	+4	66.67	
Career total				578	265	146	167	887	662	+225	45.85	—
