= Pablo Álvarez (footballer, born 1992) =

Honduran footballer (born 1992)

Personal information
- Full name: Pablo Javier Álvarez García
- Date of birth: 29 June 1992 (age 34)
- Place of birth: Tela, Honduras
- Height: 1.80 m (5 ft 11 in)
- Position: Goalkeeper

Team information
- Current team: Victoria
- Number: 22

Youth career
- Victoria

Senior career*
Years	Team	Apps	(Gls)
- Victoria
2015–	Victoria	15	
- * Club domestic league appearances and goals as of 10:30, 20 December 2023

Pablo Javier Alvarez García (born 29 June 1992) is a Honduran professional footballer who plays as goalkeeper for Victoria.

== Club career ==
He made his professional debut in a match against Honduras Progreso that ended 2-1 then a game versus Real Sociedad. He was also part in a match where he played a game at 2013/14 Champions League.
