= Vladyslav Kopotun =

Ukrainian footballer

Vladys Kopotun
Personal information
- Full name: Vladyslav Kopotun
- Date of birth: 21 October 2000 (age 26)
- Place of birth: Kovel, Ukraine
- Height: 1.81 m (5 ft 11 in)
- Position: Forward

Team information
- Current team: Cádiz
- Number: 21

Youth career
- Parc
- Mollet
- Llerona
- Parets
- Mollet
- 2018–2019: Sabadell

Senior career*
Years	Team	Apps	(Gls)
2019–2023	Sabadell B	4	(0)
2023–2024	Sabadell	43	(7)
2024–2026	Alcorcón	64	(21)
2026–	Cádiz	7	(2)
- * Club domestic league appearances and goals as of 3 October 2026

Vladyslav Kopotun (Ukrainian: Владислав Копотун; born 21 October 2000), known as Vladys in Spain, is a Ukrainian footballer who plays as a forward for Spanish club Cádiz CF.

== Early life ==
Born in Kovel, Kopotun moved to Portugal with his parents at the age of three. In 2008, he moved to Catalonia, and went on to play for the youth sides of UD Parc, CF Mollet UE, CE Llerona and CF Parets.

== Career ==
=== Sabadell ===
In 2018, Kopotun joined CE Sabadell FC's youth setup from Mollet. He made his senior debut with the reserves in the following year, and helped the side to achieve promotion from the Segona Catalana in the 2021–22 season by scoring 25 goals in just 23 matches.

Kopotun made his first team debut with the Arquelinats on 12 March 2023, coming on as a late substitute for injured Cristian Herrera in a 0–0 Primera Federación home draw against Real Murcia CF. He scored his first goal for the side on 16 April, netting his side's third in a 3–1 home win over CD Castellón.

On 4 August 2023, Kopotun renewed his contract with Sabadell until 2025, being definitely promoted to the main squad. He was regularly used during the 2023–24 campaign, being the club's top scorer along with Marcos Baselga and Pau Resta with five goals, but still failing to avoid relegation.

=== Alcorcón ===
On 26 June 2024, Kopotun agreed to a one-year deal with AD Alcorcón, freshly relegated to the third division. He finished the season with 14 goals, being the club's top scorer as they finished 10th in their group.

=== Cádiz ===
On 5 July 2026, Kopotun moved to Segunda División side Cádiz CF on a four-year contract. He made his professional debut on 22 August, coming on as a second-half substitute for Ibon Sánchez in a 2–2 away draw against CD Eldense.
