= Luis Miguel Garrido =

Spanish footballer

Personal information
- Full name: Luis Miguel Garrido Santos
- Date of birth: 18 June 1972 (age 54)
- Place of birth: Valladolid, Spain
- Height: 1.87 m (6 ft 2 in)
- Position: Centre-back

Youth career
- Valladolid

Senior career*
Years	Team	Apps	(Gls)
1991–1994	Valladolid B	85	(3)
1992	Valladolid	2	(0)
1994–1995	Toledo	18	(0)
1995–1997	Huesca	40	(1)
1997	Levante	12	(0)
1997–1998	Gimnàstic	19	(0)
1998–2000	Cartagonova	58	(3)
2000–2001	Castellón	32	(1)
2001–2002	Racing Ferrol	25	(0)
2002–2003	Cartagonova	25	(0)
2003–2004	Zamora	19	(0)
2004–2009	Alcoyano	127	(9)
2009–2012	Gandía	74	(2)
2012–2013	Dénia	35	(1)
2013–2015	Muro	58	(1)
Total		629	(21)

Managerial career
- 2025: Alcoyano (assistant)
- 2025: Alcoyano
- * Club domestic league appearances and goals

Luis Miguel Garrido Santos (born 18 June 1972) is a Spanish former football manager and former player who played as a centre-back.

Garrido is known as the player with the most sending-offs in Spanish football, with 32 ejections (not including another three red cards for Dénia and Muro in Tercera División).

== Playing career ==
Born in Valladolid, Castile and León, Garrido represented Real Valladolid as a youth, and made his senior debut with the reserves in the 1991–92 season, in Segunda División B. He made his first team – and La Liga – debut on 31 May 1992, starting in a 2–0 away loss to Athletic Bilbao.

In 1994, Garrido signed for Segunda División side CD Toledo. After being sparingly used, he subsequently played for SD Huesca before returning to level two with Levante UD in January 1997.

Garrido played mainly in the third division in the following years, representing Gimnàstic de Tarragona, Cartagonova CF (two stints), CD Castellón, Racing de Ferrol (in division two), Zamora CF, CD Alcoyano and CF Gandía. He was a team captain for Alcoyano, and led Gandía to a promotion to the third division in 2010.

In 2012, after suffering relegation with Gandía, Garrido moved to Tercera División side CD Dénia. He agreed to a deal with fellow fourth division side Muro CF in the following year, and retired with the club in 2015, aged 43.

== Post-playing career ==
Shortly after retiring, Garrido was appointed sporting director of CD Olímpic de Xàtiva on 5 July 2015. He left the club in 2017 after having unpaid wages, and was named technical secretary of Ontinyent CF on 17 July 2018.

Garrido left Ontinyent in March 2019, amidst the club's severe financial crisis, and subsequently joined Deportivo Alavés' scouting area, to work in the Valencian Community and in the Region of Murcia. In 2020, he moved abroad for the first time in his career, joining FC Dinamo București in Romania as an assistant technical secretary.

On 22 March 2025, Garrido returned to Alcoyano as an assistant manager. On 16 April, he became the manager of the side for the remaining six matches of the 2024–25 Primera Federación, after Vicente Mir resigned.

== Managerial statistics ==
As of 26 April 2025

Managerial record by team and tenure
Team	Nat	From	To	Record								Ref
Team	Nat	From	To	G	W	D	L	GF	GA	GD	Win %	Ref
Alcoyano	(Spain)	16 April 2025	Present	2	0	1	1	0	2	−2	0.00	
Total				2	0	1	1	0	2	−2	0.00	—
