= José María Salmerón =

Spanish footballer and manager

Personal information
- Full name: José María Salmerón Morales
- Date of birth: 23 October 1966 (age 60)
- Place of birth: Almería, Spain
- Position: Winger

Team information
- Current team: Almería B (manager)

Youth career
- 1980: AD Almería
- 1980–1985: Real Madrid

Senior career*
Years	Team	Apps	(Gls)
1984	Real Madrid	1	(0)
1985–1989	Real Madrid B	107	(9)
1989–1991	Tenerife	17	(0)
1991–1992	Levante	25	(3)
1992–1993	Sant Andreu	11	(4)
1993–1995	Poli Almería	25	(1)
Total		186	(17)

Managerial career
- 1999–2001: Almería
- 2001–2002: Mármol Macael
- 2002–2003: SS Reyes
- 2003–2005: Poli Ejido (assistant)
- 2003: Poli Ejido (caretaker)
- 2004: Poli Ejido (caretaker)
- 2005–2006: Poli Ejido
- 2006–2007: Lorca Deportiva
- 2007–2008: Real Madrid C
- 2008: Alavés
- 2010: Almería B
- 2012–2013: Fuenlabrada
- 2015: Cacereño
- 2015–2016: UCAM Murcia
- 2017–2018: Real Murcia
- 2018–2019: Recreativo
- 2019–2020: Burgos
- 2020–2021: UCAM Murcia
- 2022–2023: Badajoz
- 2025: Sanluqueño
- 2025–: Almería B
- * Club domestic league appearances and goals

José María Salmerón Morales (born 23 October 1966) is a Spanish retired footballer who played as a winger, and is the manager of UD Almería B.

Formed at Real Madrid, where he made one first-team appearance and represented the reserves in the Segunda División, he also represented Tenerife in La Liga.

Salmerón's managerial career of over two decades was mainly spent in the lower leagues, with spells at four teams in the second division.

== Club career ==
Born in Almería, Andalusia, Salmerón joined Real Madrid's youth setup in 1980, after a recommendation from Vicente del Bosque. On 9 September 1984, while still a junior, he made his first team – and La Liga – debut, starting and playing the full 90 minutes in a 1–1 away draw against Sporting de Gijón; the weekend had been affected by a professionals' strike, meaning that many youths made their debuts.

However, Salmerón later suffered with injuries, and spent the vast majority of his spell with the reserves in Segunda División. He moved to CD Tenerife in the 1989 summer, but after being again injury prone, only appeared sparingly.

Salmerón subsequently represented Levante UD and UE Sant Andreu in Segunda División B, and CP Almería in Tercera División. He retired with the latter in 1995, aged only 29, after achieving promotion to the third level.

== Managerial career ==
Salmerón started his managerial career with newly formed UD Almería in 1999, as the club were already relegated from the third level. He remained in charge in the following season, as the Rojiblancos were promoted at first attempt.

In June 2003, after a stint at UD San Sebastián de los Reyes, Salmerón was appointed assistant manager at Polideportivo Ejido. In November, he was appointed as caretaker manager, replacing fired Quique Setién. Shortly after, he returned to his previous duties after the appointment of Julián Rubio as manager; in June, after the latter's dismissal, he was again caretaker.

On 17 November 2005 Salmerón was again appointed as Poli manager, remaining in charge for the season and finishing 15th. On 26 December 2006 he was appointed at the helm of Lorca Deportiva CF.

After being relegated, Salmerón moved back to the Merengues as the C-team's manager in July 2007. On 26 February 2008 he moved to Deportivo Alavés, narrowly avoiding the drop but being sacked in December.

On 20 January 2010 Salmerón returned to Almería, being appointed manager with the reserves. He renewed his link in July, but was relieved from his duties in November.

On 14 November 2012 Salmerón was appointed at the helm of CF Fuenlabrada, but stepped down in May, after the club's relegation to the fourth level. On 15 June 2015, after nearly two years without a club, he was named CP Cacereño manager, but resigned after only eight days and moved to UCAM Murcia CF on 2 July.

In his first season at UCAM, Salmerón won their first promotion to the second tier with a play-off semi-final win over former club Castilla, then took the championship title for good measure on 8 June 2016 with a penalty shootout victory against CF Reus Deportiu. On 11 December that year, he was dismissed, having taken 18 points from as many games with the club second from bottom.

Salmerón remained in the city, taking the job at third-tier Real Murcia CF on 16 October 2017. The following June, after play-off quarter-final elimination by Elche CF, his contract was not renewed. He then became manager of Recreativo de Huelva and won their group, but was eliminated in the semi-finals of the post-season by CD Mirandés, and turned down a new deal in June 2019.

On 12 October 2019, Salmerón returned to work at Burgos CF. Nine months later he was hired again by UCAM with the goal of promotion, but lost 1–0 to UD Ibiza in the play-off final on 23 May 2021.

Following a league restructuring, UCAM remained in the third tier in the new Primera División RFEF, while Salmerón was dismissed on 6 November 2021, having taken three wins and as many draws in the first 11 games of the season. A year later, he was hired in the same division at CD Badajoz. After eight straight games without winning, Salmerón was fired on 22 March 2023.

On 9 February 2025, after nearly two years without a club, Salmerón was named manager of Atlético Sanluqueño CF in the third division. On 5 November, he returned to Almería and their B-team, now in Segunda Federación.

== Managerial statistics ==
As of 23 November 2025

Managerial record by team and tenure
Team	Nat	From	To	Record								Ref
Team	Nat	From	To	G	W	D	L	GF	GA	GD	Win %	Ref
Almería	(Spain)	3 May 1999	13 January 2001	68	31	20	17	95	60	+35	45.59	
Mármol Macael	(Spain)	28 May 2001	1 July 2002	46	22	16	8	67	37	+30	47.83	
SS Reyes	(Spain)	1 July 2002	30 June 2003	47	26	13	8	84	51	+33	55.32	
Poli Ejido (caretaker)	(Spain)	17 November 2003	24 November 2003	1	0	1	0	1	1	+0	0.00	
Poli Ejido (caretaker)	(Spain)	1 June 2004	28 June 2004	3	2	0	1	2	2	+0	66.67	
Poli Ejido	(Spain)	17 November 2005	18 June 2006	30	12	7	11	31	30	+1	40.00	
Lorca Deportiva	(Spain)	26 December 2006	26 February 2007	8	2	1	5	8	11	−3	25.00	
Real Madrid C	(Spain)	1 July 2007	26 February 2008	29	13	5	11	35	33	+2	44.83	
Alavés	(Spain)	26 February 2008	23 December 2008	34	10	12	12	33	45	−12	29.41	
Almería B	(Spain)	20 January 2010	30 November 2010	35	11	13	11	49	47	+2	31.43	
Fuenlabrada	(Spain)	14 November 2012	25 May 2013	30	12	9	9	48	36	+12	40.00	
Cacereño	(Spain)	15 June 2015	23 June 2015	0	0	0	0	0	0	+0	—	
UCAM Murcia	(Spain)	26 June 2015	11 December 2016	65	30	21	14	81	55	+26	46.15	
Real Murcia	(Spain)	16 October 2017	31 May 2018	33	16	7	10	37	34	+3	48.48	
Recreativo	(Spain)	9 July 2018	27 June 2019	42	23	11	8	52	29	+23	54.76	
Burgos	(Spain)	14 October 2019	24 June 2020	20	8	5	7	22	25	−3	40.00	
UCAM Murcia	(Spain)	11 July 2020	6 November 2021	42	18	11	13	52	46	+6	42.86	
Badajoz	(Spain)	5 October 2022	22 March 2023	22	6	8	8	19	27	−8	27.27	
Sanluqueño	(Spain)	9 February 2025	4 May 2025	12	3	5	4	14	18	−4	25.00	
Almería B	(Spain)	5 November 2025	Present	3	2	1	0	6	3	+3	66.67	
Total				570	247	166	157	736	590	+146	43.33	—

== Honours ==
UCAM Murcia

- Segunda División B: 2015–16
