= Alejandro Sandroni =

Spanish football manager

Personal information
- Full name: Héctor Alejandro Altamirano Sandroni
- Date of birth: 16 December 1972 (age 53)
- Place of birth: Córdoba, Argentina
- Height: 1.89 m (6 ft 2 in)
- Position: Midfielder

Team information
- Current team: Minera (manager)

Youth career
- Racing de Córdoba
- Yeclano CF

Senior career*
Years	Team	Apps	(Gls)
1991–1992	Petrelense		
1992–1994	Yecla Promesas		
1994–1996	Yeclano CF	10	(1)
1996–1997	Olímpico Totana		
1997–1998	Pinoso		
1998–2001	Jumilla		
2001–2002	Yeclano CF		
2002–2003	Sangonera		
2003–2004	Hellín		
2004–2005	Jumilla		
2005–2006	Yeclano Deportivo		

Managerial career
- 2006–2011: Yeclano Deportivo
- 2011–2013: Murcia B
- 2014–2015: Olímpic Xàtiva
- 2016–2021: Yeclano Deportivo
- 2021: Linares
- 2023–2024: Intercity
- 2025–2026: Talavera
- 2026–: Minera
- * Club domestic league appearances and goals

Héctor Alejandro Altamirano Sandroni (born 16 December 1972) is an Argentine retired footballer who played as a midfielder, and is the current manager of Segunda Federación side CD Minera.

== Playing career ==
Born in Córdoba, Sandroni moved to Yecla, Region of Murcia at the age of 14. After playing youth football with Yeclano CF, he represented UD Petrelense CF and Yecla Promesas in the regional leagues before returning to Yeclano, with the club in Segunda División B.

After leaving Yeclano in 1996, Sandroni played for Tercera División sides Club Olímpico de Totana, Pinoso CF, Jumilla CF, Sangonera Atlético CF and Hellín Deportivo before joining newly-formed Yeclano Deportivo in 2005. In 2006, after achieving promotion o the fourth division, he retired at the age of 33.

== Managerial career ==
Immediately after retiring, Sandroni became manager of his last club Yeclano. He took the club to a first-ever promotion to Segunda División B in 2010, and left in 2011, after suffering relegation.

On 30 June 2011, Sandroni took over Real Murcia's reserves in the fourth division. He left on 26 June 2013, and worked as a youth coordinator at Caudete Deportivo before being named at the helm of fellow league team CD Olímpic de Xàtiva on 16 July 2014.

On 14 June 2016, after one year without a club, Sandroni returned to Yeclano. He again led the club to the third division in 2019, and left on 27 May 2021, after another relegation.

On 7 June 2021, Sandroni was appointed manager of Linares Deportivo in Primera División RFEF. He was sacked on 24 September, after no wins in four matches.

On 17 April 2023, Sandroni was named manager of fellow third division side CF Intercity. After managing to avoid relegation with the club, he renewed his contract for a further season on 27 June.

Sandroni was dismissed by Intercity on 24 September 2024, after a poor start to the 2024–25 campaign. On 2 December 2025, after a more than a year without a club, he was appointed manager of CF Talavera de la Reina also in division three.

On 26 May 2026, after suffering relegation, Sandroni left Talavera as his contract was due to expire. On 8 July, he was named manager of fellow fourth division side CD Minera.

== Managerial statistics ==
As of 8 November 2026

Managerial record by team and tenure
Team	Nat	From	To	Record								Ref
Team	Nat	From	To	G	W	D	L	GF	GA	GD	Win %	Ref
Yeclano Deportivo	(Spain)	1 July 2006	16 May 2011	198	83	45	70	330	261	+69	41.92	
Murcia B	(Spain)	30 June 2011	26 June 2013	70	30	16	24	77	71	+6	42.86	
Olímpic Xàtiva	(Spain)	15 July 2014	30 June 2015	38	16	7	15	38	37	+1	42.11	
Yeclano Deportivo	(Spain)	14 June 2016	27 May 2021	187	94	40	53	323	204	+119	50.27	
Linares	(Spain)	7 June 2021	24 September 2021	4	0	2	2	4	6	−2	0.00	
Intercity	(Spain)	17 April 2023	24 September 2024	49	16	13	20	49	58	−9	32.65	
Talavera de la Reina	(Spain)	2 December 2025	26 May 2026	26	9	7	10	28	33	−5	34.62	
Minera	(Spain)	8 July 2026	Present	9	6	2	1	13	6	+7	66.67	
Total				581	254	132	195	862	676	+186	43.72	—
