= Mikel Llorente =

Spanish football manager (born 1982)

Personal information
- Full name: Mikel Llorente Etxarri
- Date of birth: 15 December 1981 (age 44)
- Place of birth: Hondarribia, Spain
- Position: Midfielder

Youth career
- Real Sociedad

Senior career*
Years	Team	Apps	(Gls)
2001	Real Sociedad B	5	(1)
2002–2003	UPV		
2003–2012	Hondarribia		

Managerial career
- 2008–2012: Hondarribia (youth)
- 2012–2017: Hondarribia
- 2017–2018: Chiasso (assistant)
- 2018–2022: Real Sociedad (youth)
- 2022–2024: Real Sociedad C
- 2024: Real Unión
- * Club domestic league appearances and goals

Mikel Llorente Etxarri (born 15 December 1981) is a Spanish retired footballer who played as a midfielder.

== Playing career ==
Born in Hondarribia, Gipuzkoa, Basque Country, Llorente was a Real Sociedad youth graduate. He featured with the reserves in the 2001–02 season in Segunda División B, but left the club in December and subsequently represented Tercera División side Universidad del País Vasco-Vasconia.

Llorente subsequently returned to his hometown, playing for Hondarribia FE in the regional leagues.

== Managerial career ==
While still a player, Llorente managed the youth sides of Hondarribia, before being appointed in charge of the first team on 6 April 2012. On 22 June 2017, he moved abroad and joined Guille Abascal's staff at Swiss side FC Chiasso, as his assistant.

On 20 June 2018, Llorente returned to Real Sociedad, after becoming an assistant of the Juvenil A squad. He was named in charge of the Easo (Juvenil B) squad in 2020, before returning to the Juvenil A in July 2021, now as manager.

On 31 May 2022, Llorente was named at the helm of the C-team in Segunda Federación, replacing Sergio Francisco who had been appointed in charge of the B's. On 2 June 2024, he departed the Txuri-urdin, and was appointed manager of Primera Federación side Real Unión nineteen days later.

On 3 December 2024, following a string of poor results and with the club in the relegation zone, Real Unión announced that they had sacked Llorente.

== Personal life ==
Llorente's older brother Joseba was also a footballer. A forward, he too played for Real Sociedad.
