= Rubén Anuarbe =

Spanish footballer

Personal information
- Full name: Rubén Anuarbe Martín
- Date of birth: 18 June 1981 (age 45)
- Place of birth: Madrid, Spain
- Height: 1.70 m (5 ft 7 in)
- Position: Full-back

Youth career
- Los Molinos

Senior career*
Years	Team	Apps	(Gls)
1998–1999	Los Molinos		
1999–2001	El Álamo		
2001–2002	Fuenlabrada B	15	(1)
2002–2004	Fuenlabrada	34	(1)
2004–2005	Lanzarote	17	(0)
2005–2008	SS Reyes	111	(0)
2008–2009	Portuense	34	(5)
2009–2012	Alcorcón	66	(0)
2012–2017	Fuenlabrada	157	(4)
Total		434	(11)

Managerial career
- 2025: Fuenlabrada
- * Club domestic league appearances and goals

Rubén Anuarbe Martín (born 18 June 1981) is a Spanish football coach and a former defender (either right or left-back).

Anuarbe's career is mainly associated with CF Fuenlabrada, after having more than 200 appearances in two spells as a player, and later becoming a sporting director and manager of the club.
