= Jokin Aranbarri =

Spanish football manager (born 1984)

Personal information
- Full name: Jokin Aranbarri Arrizabalaga
- Date of birth: 23 October 1984 (age 42)
- Place of birth: Azkoitia, Spain
- Height: 1.77 m (5 ft 10 in)
- Position: Forward

Team information
- Current team: Eibar (manager)

Youth career
- Anaitasuna

Senior career*
Years	Team	Apps	(Gls)
2001–2004	Anaitasuna		
2004–2005	Aurrerá Ondarroa		
2005–2006	Barakaldo	19	(0)
2006–2007	Gernika		(22)
2007–2008	Lemona	29	(5)
2008–2013	Sestao River	112	(20)
2013–2016	Arenas Getxo	83	(13)

Managerial career
- 2016–2021: Eibar (youth)
- 2021–2024: Vitoria
- 2024–2026: Bilbao Athletic
- 2026–: Eibar
- * Club domestic league appearances and goals

Jokin Aranbarri Arrizabalaga (born 23 October 1984) is a Spanish retired footballer who played as a forward, and the manager of SD Eibar.

== Playing career ==
Born in Azkoitia, Gipuzkoa, Basque Country, Aranbarri made his senior debut with CD Anaitasuna in the 2001–02 season, suffering relegation from Tercera División. In 2004, after scoring 20 goals for the side in the Regional Preferente, he moved to CD Aurrerá Ondarroa in the fourth division.

In 2005, Aranbarri signed for Segunda División B side Barakaldo CF. After one year back in the fourth level, where he scored a career-best 22 goals for Gernika Club, he represented fellow third division sides SD Lemona and Sestao River Club; he would spend the entire 2009–10 campaign sidelined due to an injury with the latter, as they suffered relegation.

Aranbarri left Sestao in 2013, and joined Arenas Club de Getxo in division four on 25 July of that year. He helped the club to achieve promotion in 2015, before retiring in the following year, aged 31.

== Managerial career ==
Shortly after retiring, Aranbarri was named manager of SD Eibar's Cadete Honor squad. He took over the Juvenil squad in August 2019, before being named at the helm of the farm team CD Vitoria on 2 June 2021.

On 8 May 2024, Aranbarri announced he would depart the Armeros at the end of the season, in which Vitoria achieved promotion to Segunda Federación. On 6 June, he joined the structure of Athletic Bilbao, after being named in charge of the reserves in Primera Federación.

On 28 May 2026, Aranbarri left Bilbao Athletic, and was appointed at the helm of Segunda División side SD Eibar on 20 June.

== Managerial statistics ==
As of 22 November 2026

Managerial record by team and tenure
Team	Nat	From	To	Record								Ref
Team	Nat	From	To	G	W	D	L	GF	GA	GD	Win %	Ref
Vitoria	(Spain)	2 June 2021	12 May 2024	104	57	29	18	169	85	+84	54.81	
Bilbao Athletic	(Spain)	6 June 2024	28 May 2026	76	28	19	29	87	91	−4	36.84	
Eibar	(Spain)	20 June 2026	Present	15	8	3	4	26	17	+9	53.33	
Total				195	93	51	51	282	193	+89	47.69	—
