= Antón Escobar =

Spanish footballer

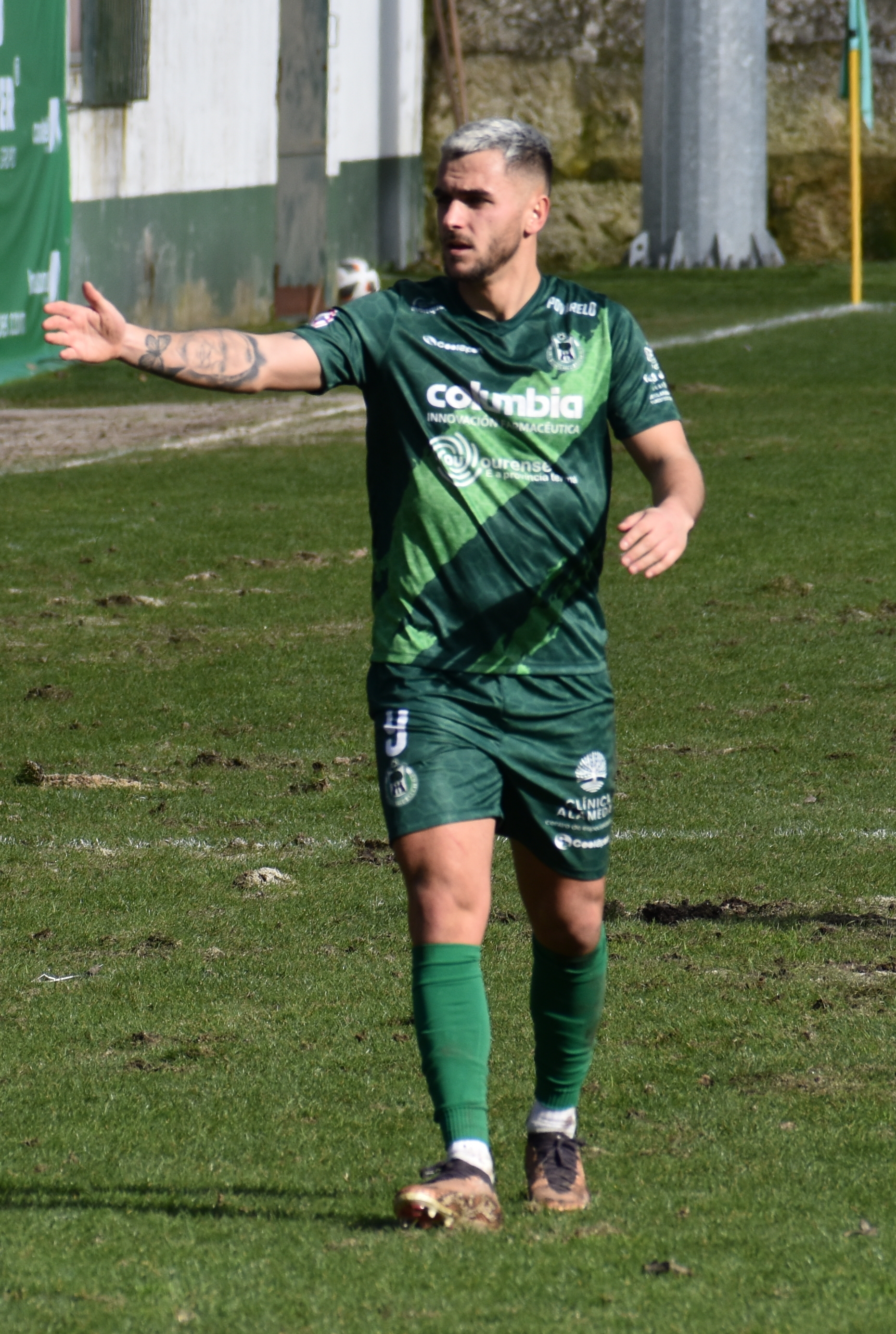

Personal information
- Full name: Antón Escobar Tapias
- Date of birth: 16 June 1998 (age 28)
- Place of birth: Nigrán, Spain
- Height: 1.79 m (5 ft 10 in)
- Position: Forward

Team information
- Current team: Cultural Leonesa

Youth career
- Val Miñor
- 2013–2015: Celta
- 2015–2017: Val Miñor

Senior career*
Years	Team	Apps	(Gls)
2017–2018	Choco	32	(10)
2018–2021	Polvorín	67	(33)
2019–2021	Lugo	3	(0)
2020	→ Coruxo (loan)	6	(0)
2021–2022	Bergantiños	33	(9)
2022–2023	Arenteiro	33	(14)
2023–2024	Real Unión	37	(12)
2024–2025	Cultural Leonesa	35	(10)
2025–2026	Racing Ferrol	33	(5)
2026–	Cultural Leonesa	0	(0)
- * Club domestic league appearances and goals as of 9 June 2026

Antón Escobar Tapias (born 16 June 1998) is a Spanish professional footballer who plays as a forward for Cultural y Deportiva Leonesa.

== Club career ==
Born in Nigrán, Pontevedra, Galicia, Escobar finished his formation with ED Val Miñor. On 9 August 2017, after spending the pre-season with Segunda División B side Coruxo FC, he signed for CD Choco in Tercera División.

Escobar made his senior debut on 20 August 2017, starting in a 1–1 away draw against CD Cultural Areas. He scored his first goals on 12 October, netting a brace in a 2–2 draw at SD Negreira, and finished the season with ten goals.

On 19 July 2018, Escobar joined CD Lugo on a two-year deal, being initially assigned to the farm team in the fourth division. He made his first team debut on 29 September of the following year, coming on as a late substitute for Christian Herrera in a 1–4 home loss against CD Tenerife in the Segunda División championship.

On 30 January 2020, Escobar was loaned to Segunda División B side Coruxo FC for the remainder of the campaign. After leaving Lugo in 2021, he played for Segunda Federación sides Bergantiños FC and CD Arenteiro, achieving promotion with the latter.

On 10 July 2023, Escobar signed for Real Unión in Primera Federación. On 10 June of the following year, he moved to fellow league team Cultural y Deportiva Leonesa on a one-year deal.
