= Albert Sánchez =

Spanish football manager (born 1987)

Personal information
- Full name: Albert Sánchez Saura
- Date of birth: 1 April 1987 (age 39)
- Place of birth: Esplugues de Llobregat, Spain
- Positions: Centre-back; midfielder

Team information
- Current team: Las Palmas (manager)

Senior career*
Years	Team	Apps	(Gls)
- Sant Ildefons
- Levante Las Planas

Managerial career
- 2011–2013: Levante Las Planas (women)
- 2013–2017: Espanyol (youth)
- 2019–2020: Qadsia (assistant)
- 2020–2021: Al Fateh U20
- 2021–2022: Barcelona (youth)
- 2022–2024: Barcelona B (assistant)
- 2024–2025: Barcelona B
- 2025–2026: Dunkerque
- 2026–: Las Palmas
- * Club domestic league appearances and goals

Albert Sánchez Saura (born 1 April 1987) is a Spanish football manager and former player who played as either a centre-back or a midfielder. He is the current manager of UD Las Palmas.

== Playing career ==
Born in Esplugues de Llobregat, Barcelona, Catalonia, Sánchez played for Sant Ildefons and Levante Las Planas in the regional leagues, before retiring at the age of 24 to pursue a coaching career.

== Coaching career ==
After graduating in Physical Activity and Sports Sciences, Sánchez began his coaching career as manager of the women's team of his last club Levante Las Planas. He led the club to a first-ever promotion to the Primera División in his first season, and led the club to an eleventh place finish in his second, before leaving to work in the youth sides of Espanyol.

Sánchez worked mainly as an assistant of the under-16, under-17 and under-19 teams at the Pericos, being also a Methodology coordinator during the 2016–17 season, a role he also held at Santboià between 2015 and 2017. After leaving Espanyol in 2017, he joined Peña Deportiva as a Methodology Director and fitness coach in the main squad.

In July 2019, after a period at Chinese club Beijing Enterprises Group, Sánchez became an assistant coach of Pablo Franco at Qadsia in Kuwait. He moved to Al Fateh in the following year, being a Technical Director while also taking over their under-20 team.

In July 2021, Sánchez was announced as Óscar López's assistant at Barcelona's Juvenil A squad. On 16 July 2022, he moved to Barcelona B as an assistant to Rafael Márquez.

On 25 July 2024, Sánchez was named manager of Barcelona B after Márquez left the club. He was removed from the role the following February and joined the club's technical structure.

On 30 July 2025, Sánchez was named manager of Ligue 2 side USL Dunkerque, after Gonçalo Feio left the club. On 29 October 2026, he left after agreeing to a two-year contract with UD Las Palmas back in his home country.

== Managerial statistics ==
As of 9 November 2026

Managerial record by team and tenure
Team	Nat	From	To	Record								Ref
Team	Nat	From	To	G	W	D	L	GF	GA	GD	Win %	Ref
Barcelona B	(Spain)	25 July 2024	25 February 2025	25	4	13	8	31	38	−7	16.00	
Dunkerque	(France)	30 July 2025	29 October 2026	47	15	14	18	75	65	+10	31.91	
Las Palmas	(Spain)	29 October 2026	Present	2	2	0	0	5	2	+3	100.00	
Total				74	21	27	26	111	105	+6	28.38	—
