= Torrellano CF =

Torrellano
- Full name: Torrellano Club de Fútbol
- Founded: 1983
- Dissolved: 2009
- Ground: Estadio Municipal, Elche, Valencia, Spain
- Capacity: 2,000
- 2008–09: Regional Preferente – Group 4, 1st of 18 (champions)
Home colours	Away colours

Torrellano Club de Fútbol was a Spanish football team based in Torrellano (es), Elche, in the Valencian Community. Founded in 1983 it was dissolved 26 years later, and held home matches at Estadio Municipal de Torrellano, with a capacity of 2,000 spectators.

== History ==
Founded in 1983, Torrellano spent the first sixteen years of its existence competing in the regional leagues. In 2000 it first reached Tercera División, lasting five seasons.

In the 2009 summer the club merged with CD Illice, creating Torrellano Illice CF.

== Season to season ==
Season	Tier	Division	Place	Copa del Rey
1983–84	7	2ª Reg.	2nd	
1984–85	6	1ª Reg.	4th	
1985–86	6	1ª Reg.	8th	
1986–87	6	1ª Reg.	4th	
1987–88	6	1ª Reg.	8th	
1988–89	6	1ª Reg.	11th	
1989–90	6	1ª Reg.	4th	
1990–91	6	1ª Reg.	5th	
1991–92	6	1ª Reg.	3rd	
1992–93	6	1ª Reg.	9th	
1993–94	6	1ª Reg.	5th	
1994–95	6	1ª Reg.	4th	
1995–96	6	1ª Reg.	8th	

Season	Tier	Division	Place	Copa del Rey
1996–97	6	1ª Reg.	1st	
1997–98	5	Reg. Pref.	5th	
1998–99	5	Reg. Pref.	3rd	
1999–2000	5	Reg. Pref.	2nd	
2000–01	4	3ª	11th	
2001–02	4	3ª	16th	
2002–03	4	3ª	9th	
2003–04	4	3ª	11th	
2004–05	4	3ª	19th	
2005–06	5	Reg. Pref.	6th	
2006–07	5	Reg. Pref.	3rd	
2007–08	5	Reg. Pref.	4th	
2008–09	5	Reg. Pref.	1st	

- 5 seasons in Tercera División
