= Fran Justo =

Spanish football manager

Personal information
- Full name: Francisco Justo Rodríguez
- Date of birth: 24 August 1989 (age 37)
- Place of birth: Ourense, Spain
- Position: Midfielder

Team information
- Current team: Alcorcón (manager)

Youth career
- Pabellón Ourense
- Velle
- Ponte Ourense

Senior career*
Years	Team	Apps	(Gls)
2009–2013	Ponte Ourense		

Managerial career
- 2007–2013: Ponte Ourense (youth)
- 2013–2015: Nogueira
- 2015–2016: Ourense (youth)
- 2016–2020: Ourense
- 2020–2022: Arenteiro
- 2022–2023: Lugo
- 2023: Real Unión
- 2024: Real Unión
- 2024–2025: Algeciras
- 2025: Mirandés
- 2026–: Alcorcón
- * Club domestic league appearances and goals

Francisco "Fran" Justo Rodríguez (born 24 August 1989) is a Spanish football manager and former player who played as a midfielder. He is the current manager of AD Alcorcón.

== Career ==
Born in Ourense, Galicia, Justo represented hometown sides Pabellón Ourense CF, CD Velle and Ponte Ourense CF as a youth. He made his senior debut with the latter, but retired in 2013, aged just 23, to pursue a coaching career; he was already in charge of the club's youth setup.

In June 2013, Justo was appointed manager of SD Nogueira de Ramuín in the Primeira Autonómica, and achieved promotion to the Preferente Autonómica in the following year. In 2015, after suffering relegation, he left the club and returned to Ourense's youth sides.

On 28 June 2016, Justo was named in charge of the first team of Ourense, also in the Preferente. He achieved promotion to Tercera División in his first season, and renewed his contract on 22 May 2018.

On 3 August 2020, after narrowly missing out promotion with Ourense in the previous campaign, Justo was appointed at the helm of CD Arenteiro also in the fourth division. He achieved promotion to the new fourth tier named Segunda División RFEF in his first year, and renewed his contract on 5 June 2021.

In the 2022–23 season, Justo led Arenteiro to the top of their group, aside from knocking out La Liga side UD Almería from the Copa del Rey. On 23 November 2022, he moved straight to Segunda División after replacing Hernán Pérez in charge of CD Lugo.

Justo's first professional match in charge occurred on 27 November 2022, as Lugo drew 1–1 against Levante UD. The following 31 January, after six defeats in nine matches, he was sacked.

On 19 June 2023, Justo took over Primera Federación side Real Unión. He was dismissed on 26 December, after six winless matches, but returned to the club the following 4 April, following the sacking of his predecessor, Iñigo Idiakez.

Justo left the Txuri-beltz on 17 June 2024, after managing to avoid relegation, and took over fellow third division side Algeciras CF eleven days later. On 9 June of the following year, he left the latter, and took over second division side CD Mirandés late in the month.

On 2 November 2025, Justo was dismissed by the Jabatos, with the club in the relegation zone. The following 1 June, he was announced as manager of AD Alcorcón in division three.

== Managerial statistics ==
As of 22 November 2026

Managerial record by team and tenure
Team	Nat	From	To	Record								Ref
Team	Nat	From	To	G	W	D	L	GF	GA	GD	Win %	Ref
Nogueira	(Spain)	25 June 2013	26 May 2015	72	35	12	25	105	79	+26	48.61	
Ourense	(Spain)	28 June 2016	27 July 2020	143	75	38	30	219	116	+103	52.45	
Arenteiro	(Spain)	3 August 2020	23 November 2022	83	43	27	13	111	65	+46	51.81	
Lugo	(Spain)	23 November 2022	31 January 2023	9	2	1	6	4	10	−6	22.22	
Real Unión	(Spain)	19 June 2023	26 December 2023	18	6	3	9	25	28	−3	33.33	
Real Unión	(Spain)	4 April 2024	17 June 2024	8	3	1	4	10	12	−2	37.50	
Algeciras	(Spain)	28 June 2024	9 June 2025	38	12	16	10	46	46	+0	31.58	
Mirandés	(Spain)	30 June 2025	2 November 2025	13	2	4	7	13	21	−8	15.38	
Alcorcón	(Spain)	1 June 2026	Present	13	6	6	1	25	14	+11	46.15	
Career total				397	184	108	105	558	391	+167	46.35	—
