= Iñigo Vélez =

Spanish footballer

Personal information
- Full name: Iñigo Vélez de Mendizábal Fernández de Garaialde
- Date of birth: 15 March 1982 (age 44)
- Place of birth: Vitoria, Spain
- Height: 1.93 m (6 ft 4 in)
- Position: Forward

Team information
- Current team: Cartagena (manager)

Youth career
- 1992–1999: Aurrerá

Senior career*
Years	Team	Apps	(Gls)
1999–2000	Aurrerá B		
1999–2000	Aurrerá	3	(0)
2000–2002	Athletic Bilbao	0	(0)
2000–2002	→ Aurrerá (loan)	51	(15)
2002–2004	Espanyol B	28	(4)
2004–2007	Eibar	83	(13)
2007–2008	Murcia	24	(1)
2008–2009	Athletic Bilbao	4	(0)
2009–2011	Numancia	66	(15)
2011–2013	Xerez	39	(8)
Total		298	(56)

Managerial career
- 2016–2018: Aretxabaleta
- 2018–2022: Amorebieta
- 2023: Lugo
- 2023–2024: Ponferradina
- 2024–2025: Recreativo
- 2026–: Cartagena
- * Club domestic league appearances and goals

Iñigo Vélez de Mendizábal Fernández de Garaialde (born 15 March 1982), known as Iñigo or Vélez, is a Spanish former professional footballer who played as a forward. He is the manager of Primera Federación club Cartagena.

== Playing career ==
Born in Vitoria-Gasteiz, Álava, Vélez began his career in the lower leagues, playing for local CD Aurrerá de Vitoria and RCD Espanyol's B team. In the summer of 2004 he signed for SD Eibar of the Segunda División, scoring four goals in 40 games in his second season as they were eventually relegated.

Íñigo competed in La Liga with Real Murcia CF in 2007–08, in another relegation-ending campaign. He made his debut in the competition as a late substitute in a 2–0 away loss against Villarreal CF on 23 September 2007, netting two months later in the 1–1 draw at RCD Mallorca.

The following season, Vélez joined Athletic Bilbao, but took almost no part whatsoever in the Basque side's campaign (only five competitive matches). His contract was mutually terminated in late July 2009, and he joined relegated CD Numancia on a three-year deal, with the former club being able to re-buy in 2010 or 2011 – Athletic teammate Joseba Garmendia also made the move.

Iñigo continued playing in the second tier in 2011–12, penning a two-year contract with Xerez CD. After suffering relegation in 2013, and following an unsuccessful trial with CD Guadalajara, he decided to retire due to recurrent injury problems.

== Coaching career ==
On 13 May 2016, Vélez was appointed manager of amateurs UD Aretxabaleta. On 2 June 2018, he signed with SD Amorebieta in the same capacity. With a 1–0 playoff win at CD Badajoz on 22 May 2021, he guided the team to the second division for the first time in their history.

Vélez was dismissed by Amorebieta on 8 March 2022. Nearly one year later, he became CD Lugo's fourth coach of the campaign.

On 16 June 2023, having been unable to prevent the Galicians' relegation, Vélez signed as new coach of SD Ponferradina, who also went down to Primera Federación. He was relieved of his duties the following 18 March, after a run of one win in the last five games.

On 22 December 2024, Vélez replaced Abel Gómez at the helm of Recreativo de Huelva also in the third tier. The following 23 April, he was himself dismissed with the club in the relegation zone.

Vélez was appointed manager of FC Cartagena on 18 February 2026.

== Managerial statistics ==
As of 15 November 2026

Managerial record by team and tenure
Team	Nat	From	To	Record								Ref
Team	Nat	From	To	G	W	D	L	GF	GA	GD	Win %	Ref
Aretxabaleta	(Spain)	17 May 2016	2 June 2018	68	29	23	16	91	57	+34	42.65	
Amorebieta	(Spain)	2 June 2018	8 March 2022	129	47	41	41	156	157	−1	36.43	
Lugo	(Spain)	7 March 2023	16 June 2023	12	1	5	6	7	16	−9	8.33	
Ponferradina	(Spain)	16 June 2023	18 March 2024	29	13	11	5	29	18	+11	44.83	
Recreativo	(Spain)	22 December 2024	23 April 2025	15	3	7	5	11	19	−8	20.00	
Cartagena	(Spain)	18 February 2026	Present	27	12	9	6	32	26	+6	44.44	
Career total				280	105	96	79	326	293	+33	37.50	—
