= Pablo Álvarez (footballer, born 1994) =

Spanish football manager

Personal information
- Full name: Pablo Álvarez Ugarte
- Date of birth: 15 July 1994 (age 32)
- Place of birth: Madrid, Spain
- Position: Left-back

Team information
- Current team: Valencia (assistant)

Youth career
- Jocker Moratalaz
- Moratalaz
- San Fernando Henares
- Coslada
- 2011–2013: Leganés

Senior career*
Years	Team	Apps	(Gls)
2013–2014	Covibar	27	(3)
2014–2015	San Roque Barajas	23	(0)
2015–2016	Moratalaz	31	(1)
Total		81	(4)

Managerial career
- 2014–2015: San Roque Barajas (youth)
- 2015–2017: Rivas (youth)
- 2017–2018: Móstoles URJC (youth)
- 2018: Móstoles URJC (assistant)
- 2019–2021: Izarra
- 2021: Izarra
- 2021–2023: Navalcarnero
- 2023–2024: SS Reyes
- 2024–2026: Alcorcón
- 2026–: Valencia (assistant)
- * Club domestic league appearances and goals

Pablo Álvarez Ugarte (born 15 July 1994) is a Spanish retired footballer who played as a left-back, and the current assistant manager of Valencia CF.

== Playing career ==
Born in Madrid, Álvarez only played in his hometown during his entire career. After representing UD Jocker Moratalaz, ED Moratalaz, CD San Fernando de Henares, CD Coslada and CD Leganés as a youth, he made his senior debut with CD Covibar in the regional leagues.

On 10 September 2015, after one season at CD San Roque EFF, Álvarez returned to Moratalaz. On 3 December 2016, he announced his retirement at the age of 22, after accepting an offer to become a fitness coach at UD San Sebastián de los Reyes.

== Managerial career ==
In 2014, while still a player of San Roque, Álvarez began his managerial career in the Alevín B squad of the club. He subsequently managed Rivas FC's Alevín C and Infantil A teams, before joining Alfredo Santaelena's staff at San Sebastián de los Reyes, as a fitness coach.

Álvarez was also a manager of CD Móstoles URJC's Juvenil C side, before becoming an assistant of the club's main squad. He later reunited with Santaelena in 2018, working in the China national under-15 team.

In June 2019, Álvarez joined Luis Ayllón's staff at CDA Navalcarnero as a fitness coach, but was appointed manager of Segunda División B side CD Izarra on 29 October. Sacked on 19 January 2021, he returned to the club on 9 April to replace his successor Javi Martínez.

On 25 May 2021, Álvarez returned to Navalcarnero, now being named manager of the first team in Segunda División RFEF. On 22 June 2023, after missing out promotion in the play-offs in his two seasons in charge, he left.

On 23 June 2023, Álvarez returned to Sanse after taking over the main squad also in the fourth division. On 16 November, he renewed his contract with the club until 2026, but left the club on 24 June of the following year, after agreeing to a two-year deal with AD Alcorcón in Primera Federación.

On 19 May 2026, Alcorcón announced that Álvarez would depart the club at the end of the season. On 8 July, he joined Carlos Corberán's staff at Valencia CF, as his assistant.

== Managerial statistics ==
As of 23 May 2026

Managerial record by team and tenure
Team	Nat	From	To	Record								Ref
Team	Nat	From	To	G	W	D	L	GF	GA	GD	Win %	Ref
Izarra	(Spain)	29 October 2019	19 January 2021	29	5	10	14	31	53	−22	17.24	
Izarra	(Spain)	9 April 2021	25 May 2021	7	5	1	1	14	6	+8	71.43	
Navalcarnero	(Spain)	25 May 2021	22 June 2023	76	38	12	26	95	72	+23	50.00	
SS Reyes	(Spain)	23 June 2023	24 June 2024	38	17	15	6	65	30	+35	44.74	
Alcorcón	(Spain)	24 June 2024	24 May 2026	77	26	24	27	96	90	+6	33.77	
Total				227	91	62	74	301	251	+50	40.09	—
