= Mario Simón =

Spanish football manager (born 1981)

Personal information
- Full name: Mario Simón Matías
- Date of birth: 7 January 1981 (age 45)
- Place of birth: Madrid, Spain

Managerial career
- Years: Team
- 1998–2006: San Vicente (youth)
- 2006–2008: San Vicente
- 2008–2009: Villamalea
- 2009–2011: Albacete B
- 2011: Albacete
- 2011–2012: Almansa
- 2013–2014: Almansa
- 2014–2016: La Roda
- 2017–2018: Lorca Deportiva
- 2018–2019: Socuéllamos
- 2019–2021: Albacete B
- 2021–2023: Murcia
- 2024–2025: Intercity
- 2025–2026: Unionistas

Mario Simón Matías (born 7 January 1981) is a Spanish football manager.

== Manager career ==
Born in Madrid, Simón began his managerial career at Club San Vicente de Albacete in 1998, taking care of the youth setup. In 2006, he was promoted to the main squad, being promoted with the side in his first campaign.

On 23 July 2009, after a short period at UD Villamalea, Simón was appointed Albacete Balompié B manager. On 24 March 2011 he was appointed at the helm of the main squad, replacing fired David Vidal.

Simón remained in charge of Alba for the remaining 12 matches, suffering relegation and leaving the club in June 2011. He subsequently was named UD Almansa manager in the following month.

Simón left the club in June 2012, returning to his duties in May 2013. On 12 June 2014, after missing out promotion in the play-offs with Almansa, he signed for La Roda CF.

On 10 October 2019, Atlético Albacete announced Simón as a head coach. On 7 June 2021, he was confirmed at the helm of Real Murcia CF in Segunda División RFEF.

Simón led Murcia to a promotion to Primera Federación in his first season, but left on 2 June 2023, after finishing his second one position shy of the play-offs. On 20 November 2024, after more than a year without a club, he took over fellow third division side CF Intercity, but was sacked the following 27 January.

On 17 September 2025, Simón was announced as manager of Unionistas de Salamanca CF also in division three, replacing departing Oriol Riera. On 25 May of the following year, after again narrowly missing out a play-off spot, he left.

== Managerial statistics ==
As of 23 May 2026

Managerial record by team and tenure
Team	Nat	From	To	Record								Ref
Team	Nat	From	To	G	W	D	L	GF	GA	GD	Win %	Ref
San Vicente	(Spain)	1 July 2006	30 June 2008	60	30	12	18	150	100	+50	50.00	
Villamalea	(Spain)	30 June 2008	23 July 2009	33	16	7	10	40	32	+8	48.48	
Albacete B	(Spain)	23 July 2009	24 March 2011	68	37	13	18	115	66	+49	54.41	
Albacete	(Spain)	24 March 2011	18 June 2011	12	2	1	9	15	27	−12	16.67	
Almansa	(Spain)	1 July 2011	11 June 2012	40	18	14	8	57	29	+28	45.00	
Almansa	(Spain)	23 May 2013	12 June 2014	42	20	13	9	54	45	+9	47.62	
La Roda	(Spain)	12 June 2014	23 June 2016	76	22	20	34	73	95	−22	28.95	
Lorca Deportiva	(Spain)	7 November 2017	5 June 2018	25	7	4	14	24	36	−12	28.00	
Socuéllamos	(Spain)	29 June 2018	11 July 2019	52	33	12	7	99	31	+68	63.46	
Albacete B	(Spain)	10 October 2019	7 June 2021	55	26	10	19	84	59	+25	47.27	
Murcia	(Spain)	7 June 2021	1 June 2023	76	31	28	17	95	63	+32	40.79	
Intercity	(Spain)	20 November 2024	27 January 2025	9	1	3	5	10	14	−4	11.11	
Unionistas	(Spain)	17 September 2025	25 May 2026	35	15	11	9	53	45	+8	42.86	
Total				583	258	148	177	869	642	+227	44.25	—
