= Vicente Mir =

Spanish footballer and manager

Personal information
- Full name: Vicente Mir Arnau
- Date of birth: 3 June 1968 (age 58)
- Place of birth: Meliana, Spain
- Height: 1.73 m (5 ft 8 in)
- Position: Forward

Team information
- Current team: La Nucía (manager)

Youth career
- 1977–1979: Meliana
- 1979–1987: Valencia

Senior career*
Years	Team	Apps	(Gls)
1987–1992	Mestalla		
1990–1991	→ Palamós (loan)	29	(3)
1991	Valencia	1	(0)
1992–1995	Elche	78	(22)
1995–1996	Alcoyano	36	(11)
1996–1997	Mar Menor	36	(11)
1997–1999	Yeclano	64	(8)
1999–2001	Benidorm	32	(0)
2001–2002	Villajoyosa		

Managerial career
- 2004: Benidorm (youth)
- 2005–2007: Torrellano
- 2007–2009: Alicante B
- 2009–2010: Valencia (youth)
- 2010–2011: Valencia B
- 2012–2015: Elche B
- 2016: Hércules
- 2017: Murcia
- 2017: Elche
- 2018–2019: Alcoyano
- 2019–2020: Hércules
- 2020–2021: Águilas
- 2021–2022: Saguntino
- 2022–2024: Torrent
- 2024–2025: Alcoyano
- 2025–: La Nucía
- * Club domestic league appearances and goals

Vicente Mir Arnau (born 3 June 1968) is a Spanish former professional footballer who played as a forward. He is currently manager of Segunda Federación club La Nucía.

Apart from one appearance for Valencia in La Liga, he spent his entire career as a player and manager in the lower divisions, totalling 52 goals in 246 Segunda División B games in service of five clubs.

In 2004, Mir started working as a coach.

== Playing career ==
Born in Meliana, Valencian Community, Mir was a youth product of local giants Valencia CF. After several seasons as a senior with the reserves he started his professional career with Palamós CF of the Segunda División, on loan.

Upon his return to the Che for the 1991–92 campaign, Mir was again almost exclusively associated with the B side. Main squad manager Guus Hiddink handed him his La Liga debut on 8 September 1991, and he played 31 minutes in a 1–0 away loss against Albacete Balompié after coming on as a substitute for Rommel Fernández.

Mir spent the remainder of his career in the Spanish lower leagues, competing almost exclusively in his native region and representing mainly Elche CF (three seasons). He retired at the end of 2001–02 with Villajoyosa CF, in the Tercera División.

== Coaching career ==
Mir was appointed director of youth football at Benidorm CF in 2002, remaining in the position several years. Afterwards, he took the reins of Alicante CF's reserves, promoting from the regional championships in his first year and nearly achieving the feat the following campaign, with a team full of youngsters.

For 2010–11, Mir joined Valencia B, leading the club to Segunda División B at the first attempt. He was relieved of his duties in December 2011, having recorded four wins, four draws and nine defeats during the season.

In 2012, Mir moved to fellow reserve team Elche CF Ilicitano, and in his first season he led them to a historic promotion to the third division. The next campaign, they went unbeaten at home but lost the play-off place to UE Llagostera on the last day, and he was sacked upon relegation in May 2015.

Mir returned to the city of Alicante on 18 January 2016, being hired by third-tier club Hércules CF on 18 January 2016. He was dismissed on 27 June after defeat to Cádiz CF in the play-off final.

Mir was appointed by third-level strugglers Real Murcia CF on 26 February 2017, replacing the fired Paco García. After guiding them to the playoffs he switched to Elche on 15 June, who dismissed him five months later.

On 30 May 2018, Mir was named CD Alcoyano manager. He left the following 27 February by mutual consent, when a 4–1 loss at fellow strugglers CD Teruel put the team one point off the relegation play-offs.

Mir returned for a second spell at Hércules on 9 December 2019, replacing Jesús Muñoz who had been fired earlier the same day. He lasted only until the following 11 February when, within 24 hours of a public vote of confidence from the board, he was dismissed from a team five points adrift in the relegation places.

In the following years, Mir was in charge of Águilas FC, Atlético Saguntino and Torrent CF, leading the last two clubs to promotion to Segunda Federación. On 26 December 2024, he returned to Alcoyano for a second spell, but resigned three months later.

Mir returned to Tercera Federación on 24 October 2025, being named head coach of CF La Nucía. He achieved promotion in his debut season via the play–offs, and subsequently renewed his contract.

== Managerial statistics ==
As of 8 November 2026

Managerial record by team and tenure
Team	From	To	Record								Ref
Team	From	To	G	W	D	L	GF	GA	GD	Win %	Ref
Torrellano	1 July 2005	30 June 2007	72	35	17	20	119	77	+42	48.61	
Alicante B	1 July 2007	30 June 2009	78	36	30	12	112	60	+52	46.15	
Valencia B	1 July 2010	13 December 2011	57	31	15	11	108	61	+47	54.39	
Elche B	6 June 2012	21 May 2015	118	47	33	38	149	131	+18	39.83	
Hércules	18 January 2016	27 June 2016	22	13	5	4	33	16	+17	59.09	
Murcia	26 February 2017	15 June 2017	15	9	4	2	29	11	+18	60.00	
Elche	15 June 2017	13 November 2017	18	9	6	3	30	17	+13	50.00	
Alcoyano	30 May 2018	27 February 2019	26	6	11	9	20	29	−9	23.08	
Hércules	9 December 2019	11 February 2020	9	2	2	5	10	13	−3	22.22	
Águilas	22 July 2020	27 April 2021	23	14	6	3	46	11	+35	60.87	
Saguntino	18 October 2021	28 June 2022	32	17	10	5	44	25	+19	53.13	
Torrent	26 October 2022	23 December 2024	80	36	22	22	102	77	+25	45.00	
Alcoyano	26 December 2024	13 April 2025	14	3	3	8	9	19	−10	21.43	
La Nucía	24 October 2025	Present	42	22	12	8	59	36	+23	52.38	
Total			606	280	176	150	870	583	+287	46.20	—
