= Sergio Francisco =

Spanish footballer and manager

Personal information
- Full name: Sergio Francisco Ramos
- Date of birth: 19 March 1979 (age 47)
- Place of birth: Irun, Spain
- Height: 1.80 m (5 ft 11 in)
- Position: Striker

Team information
- Current team: Burgos (manager)

Youth career
- Real Unión
- 1996–1997: Real Sociedad

Senior career*
Years	Team	Apps	(Gls)
1997–2001	Real Sociedad B	86	(40)
1999–2002	Real Sociedad	4	(0)
2001	→ Eibar (loan)	16	(0)
2001–2002	→ Onda (loan)	36	(6)
2002–2003	Real Unión	36	(9)
2003–2004	Zamora	36	(18)
2004	Lorca Deportiva	19	(2)
2005	Gimnàstic	18	(3)
2005–2011	Real Unión	136	(36)
2011	Sestao	4	(2)
2011–2012	Laudio	?	(12)
Total		391+	(128)

Managerial career
- 2012–2013: Real Unión (assistant)
- 2013–2014: Real Unión
- 2017–2022: Real Sociedad C
- 2022–2025: Real Sociedad B
- 2025: Real Sociedad
- 2026–: Burgos
- * Club domestic league appearances and goals

Sergio Francisco Ramos (born 19 March 1979), known as Sergio Francisco, is a Spanish former professional footballer who played as a striker. He is the manager of Segunda División club Burgos.

He spent the vast majority of his 15-year senior career in the lower leagues, amassing Segunda División B totals of 246 games and 71 goals for four teams and representing mainly Real Unión. In La Liga, he made four appearances for Real Sociedad.

Sergio Francisco became a manager after retiring, notably working with the reserve sides of Real Sociedad before arriving in the first team in 2025.

== Playing career ==
Born in Irun, Gipuzkoa, Basque Country, Sergio Francisco was a Real Sociedad youth graduate. After making his senior debut with the reserves in the Tercera División, he made his first appearance with the main squad on 2 February 1999, coming on as a late substitute for scorer Igor Cvitanović in a 1–0 away win against Atlético Madrid in the round of 16 of the Copa del Rey.

Troubled by injuries during his spell at the Anoeta Stadium, Sergio Francisco's La Liga bow occurred on 17 September 2000 as he replaced Edgaras Jankauskas for the final 21 minutes of the 4–1 loss at Celta de Vigo. In January 2001, he was loaned to Segunda División club Eibar until June.

Sergio Francisco subsequently alternated between the second tier and Segunda División B, representing Onda, Real Unión, Zamora, Lorca Deportiva and Gimnàstic de Tarragona. On 18 June 2005, he scored two of his three goals as a professional in a 4–4 home draw with Recreativo de Huelva.

In August 2005, after being deemed surplus to requirements by Gimnàstic, Sergio Francisco returned to Unión. He was part of the squad that promoted to the second division in the 2008–09 season but contributed rarely to this feat due to an anterior cruciate ligament injury.

On 2 February 2011, Sergio Francisco signed with fourth-division Sestao. On 28 June, he equalised a 2–2 draw against Montañesa which assured promotion in the play-offs.

Sergio Francisco retired in June 2012 aged 33, his last club being amateurs Laudio.

== Coaching career ==
=== Real Unión ===
Shortly after retiring, Sergio Francisco returned to Real Unión as assistant coach to Imanol Idiakez. On 12 July 2013, with the club facing severe financial problems, he was named manager.

On 5 June 2014, after leading the side to the 15th place in division three, Sergio Francisco was fired.

=== Real Sociedad ===
==== Reserve teams ====
Sergio Francisco went back to Real Sociedad in summer 2017, taking over their C team in the fourth division. He achieved promotion to the newly created Segunda División RFEF at the end of the 2020–21 campaign.

On 31 May 2022, Sergio Francisco was named manager of Real's reserves, recently relegated to Primera Federación, in place of the departed Xabi Alonso. On 18 November, his contract was renewed until 2025.

On 18 February 2025, Sergio Francisco further extended his link with Sanse until 2028.

==== First team ====
On 25 April 2025, Sergio Francisco was announced as longtime incumbent Imanol Alguacil's replacement at the helm of the first team, with the deal being made effective at the start of 2025–26. He resigned at the B side three days later, to "focus exclusively on planning the next season with the club's football department".

Sergio Francisco was dismissed on 14 December 2025, following a 2–1 home defeat against Girona.

=== Burgos ===
On 16 June 2026, Sergio Francisco was appointed head coach at second-tier Burgos on a one-year contract.

== Managerial statistics ==
As of 22 November 2026

Managerial record by team and tenure
Team	Nat	From	To	Record								Ref
Team	Nat	From	To	G	W	D	L	GF	GA	GD	Win %	Ref
Real Unión	(Spain)	12 July 2013	5 June 2014	45	15	12	18	49	53	−4	33.33	
Real Sociedad C	(Spain)	5 July 2017	31 May 2022	165	72	53	40	268	196	+72	43.64	
Real Sociedad B	(Spain)	31 May 2022	26 April 2025	112	41	43	28	140	108	+32	36.61	
Real Sociedad	(Spain)	1 July 2025	14 December 2025	18	6	4	8	25	24	+1	33.33	
Burgos	(Spain)	16 June 2026	Present	16	9	3	4	25	19	+6	56.25	
Total				356	143	115	98	506	400	+106	40.17	—
