= CF Intercity =

Spanish football team

- Full name: Club de Fútbol Intercity
- Nickname: Los hombres de negro (Men in black)
- Founded: 2017; 9 years ago
- Ground: Estadio Antonio Solana, Alicante, Valencia, Spain
- Capacity: 2,500
- President: Salvador Martí
- Head coach: Javi Moreno
- League: Segunda Federación – Group 3
- 2025–26: Segunda Federación – Group 5, 9th of 18
- Website: www.cfintercity.com
Home colours	Away colours

Club de Fútbol Intercity is a Spanish football team based in Alicante, in the Valencian Community. The club plays in Segunda Federación – Group 3, holding home matches at the Estadio Antonio Solana, with a capacity of 2,500 spectators.

== History ==
Intercity was created in 2017 by changing the structure of GCD Sant Joan d'Alacant.

In June 2018, after being promoted to Regional Preferente, the club aimed to play in Tercera División by merging with Novelda CF but the Royal Spanish Football Federation rejected this.

Also that month, Intercity announced its intention to be the first Spanish football club to be listed on the stock market.

In 2019, Intercity were promoted to Tercera División as regional champion, thus qualifying for the first time for the Copa del Rey. After beating UD Gran Tarajal in the preliminary round, the club faced Athletic Bilbao in the first round, losing 0–3.

== Season to season ==
Season	Tier	Division	Place	Copa del Rey
2017–18	6	1ª Reg.	1st	
2018–19	5	Reg. Pref.	1st	
2019–20	4	3ª	5th	First round
2020–21	4	3ª	3rd	
2021–22	4	2ª RFEF	1st	
2022–23	3	1ª Fed.	12th	Round of 32
2023–24	3	1ª Fed.	15th	
2024–25	3	1ª Fed.	20th	
2025–26	4	2ª Fed.	9th	
2026–27	4	2ª Fed.		

- 3 seasons in Primera Federación
- 3 seasons in Segunda Federación/Segunda División RFEF
- 2 seasons in Tercera División

== Current squad ==
As of 7 February 2026

Note: Flags indicate national team as defined under FIFA eligibility rules; some limited exceptions apply. Players may hold more than one non-FIFA nationality.

No.	Pos.	Nation	Player
1	GK	ESP	Ian Mackay
2	DF	ESP	Borja San Emeterio
3	DF	ARG	Leonel Ferroni
4	DF	ESP	David Soto
5	MF	ESP	David Timor
6	MF	ESP	Julio Gracia
7	FW	GEQ	Emilio Nsue
9	FW	ESP	Gorka Santamaría
10	FW	ESP	Cristian Herrera
11	FW	ESP	Pol Roigé
12	MF	PAN	Josiel Núñez
13	GK	ESP	Nono Gómez

No.	Pos.	Nation	Player
14	MF	ESP	Toni Arranz
16	MF	ESP	Pablo Montero (on loan from Real Madrid)
17	FW	ESP	Álex Alemán
18	FW	ARG	Bruno Romagnoli
19	FW	ESP	Pochito
20	FW	ESP	Rodri Ríos
21	FW	ESP	Sito
22	DF	ESP	Primi Férriz
23	DF	ESP	Roi Torres
24	DF	FRA	Mouhamed Diallo
27	DF	ESP	Marc Martínez

=== Out on loan ===
Note: Flags indicate national team as defined under FIFA eligibility rules; some limited exceptions apply. Players may hold more than one non-FIFA nationality.

No. / Pos. / Nation / Player; — / MF / ARG / Martín Bellotti (at Atlético Madrileño until 30 June 2026)	No. / Pos. / Nation / Player; — / FW / ESP / Keyner Ron (at Villarreal U19 until 30 June 2026)

== See also ==
- CFI Alicante, reserve team
