= 2012–13 Copa Catalunya =

Catalonia Cup

Tournament details
- Country: Catalonia

Final positions
- Champions: FC Barcelona
- Runners-up: RCD Espanyol

Tournament statistics
- Top goal scorer: Quintos (Base Roses) 4

The 2012–13 Copa Catalunya is the 24th staging of the Copa Catalunya. The competition began on 2 June 2012, and ended on 29 May 2013.

== Tournament ==
=== First phase ===
==== First round ====
| 2 June 2012 | Sant Quirze | 1 – 0 | Seva | Sant Quirze de Besora |
| 17:00 | Salarich 43' | Report | | Stadium: Municipal; Referee: Manuel Leiva |

| 2 June 2012 | Fátima | 3 – 1 | Vilanovenca | Igualada |
| 18:30 | Moreno 15'; Flores 26'; Núñez 54' | Report | Serrat 74' | Stadium: Can Masarnau; Referee: Roger Vallès |

| 3 June 2012 | Llerona | 3 – 0 | Poniente | Les Franqueses del Vallès |
| 12:00 | Martínez 11', 33'; Parra 53' | Report | | Stadium: Instalacions Parroquials; Referee: Nelson Cardona |

| 3 June 2012 | Sant Salvador | 1 – 1 | Cardona | Cercs |
| 16:00 | Fernández 44' | Report | Urrutia 85' | Stadium: Municipal; Referee: Miguel Giménez |

| 3 June 2012 | Viladecavalls | 0 – 1 | Olympia II | Viladecavalls |
| 17:00 | | Report | De Villanueva 58' | Stadium: Municipal; Referee: Raúl Díaz |

| 3 June 2012 | Sabadellenca B | 1 – 2 | Cabrera | Sabadell |
| 18:00 | Barunda 84' | Report | Solabusto 38'; Hernández 76' | Stadium: La Creu; Referee: Álvaro Tallón |

| 3 June 2012 | Flix | 2 – 4 | AEM | Flix |
| 18:30 | Figueroa 11'; Casals 27' | Report | Gómez 16', 35'; Huguet 64'; Martos 88' | Stadium: La Ventonella; Referee: Óliver Castaño |

| 3 June 2012 | Almeda | 3 – 2 | Base Vilanova | Cornellà de Llobregat |
| 19:00 | Sánchez 10'; Barceló 23'; Navarro 44' | Report | Drag 54'; Caparrós 67' | Stadium: Municipal; Referee: Sergio Fernández |

| 3 June 2012 | Espluguenc B | 0 – 1 | Iberia B | Esplugues de Llobregat |
| 20:00 | | Report | Romero 89' | Stadium: Salt de Pi; Referee: Marc González |

==== Second round ====
AEM and Olympia II received a bye.

| 8 June 2012 | Marca Ham | 1 – 2 | Jonquera | Figueres |
| 21:00 | Huget 71' | Report | Jiménez 46'; López 89' | Stadium: Municipal; Referee: Antonio Hidalgo |

| 9 June 2012 | Sant Salvador | 4 – 1 | Sant Quirze | Cercs |
| 17:00 | Gaona 47', 87', 89'; Juez 58' | Report | Polo 12' | Stadium: Municipal; Referee: Federico Campos |

| 9 June 2012 | Sant Miquel | 2 – 2 | Base Roses | Sant Miquel de Fluvià |
| 18:00 | López 60'; Sánchez 77' | Report | Mínguez 11'; Quintos 87' | Stadium: Municipal; Referee: Gerard Falgueras |

| 9 June 2012 | Vila-Roja B | 4 – 2 | Atlètic Banyoles | Girona |
| 18:00 | Sanz 6'; Amador 18'; Rodríguez 60'; Benítez 74' | Report | Guerrero 23'; Congost 84' | Stadium: Municipal; Referee: César Romero |

| 9 June 2012 | Iberia B | 6 – 2 | Carmelo | Barcelona |
| 18:00 | Bros 30'; Aranda 33'; Marquina 53'; Tejeda 76'; Montes 80', 85' | Report | Blanco 14'; Crespo 81' | Stadium: La Bàscula; Referee: Sergio Pérez |

| 9 June 2012 | Cabrera | 1 – 2 | San Joan | Cabrera de Mar |
| 18:30 | Català 85' | Report | Zapata 9'; Plana 59' | Stadium: Municipal; Referee: Raúl Aldana |

| 9 June 2012 | Miralcamp | 0 – 2 | Cervera | Miralcamp |
| 19:00 | | Report | Capdevila 1'; Gallardo 78' | Stadium: Municipal; Referee: Juan José Ruiz |

| 9 June 2012 | Roda Barà | 3 – 0 | Sant Pere | Roda de Barà |
| 19:00 | Darouich 33'; Piqué 74'; Gargallo 89' | Report | | Stadium: Municipal; Referee: Daniel López |

| 10 June 2012 | Fátima | 1 – 1 | La Guàrdia | Igualada |
| 12:00 | Horna 78' | Report | Torras 1' | Stadium: Can Masarnau; Referee: Edgar Cardoso |

| 10 June 2012 | Llerona | 2 – 2 | Granollers | Les Franqueses del Vallès |
| 12:00 | Castellsagué 17'; Polo 20' | Report | Ricart 12'; Vila 37' | Stadium: Instalacions Parroquials; Referee: Melcior Fabré |

| 10 June 2012 | Lliçà d'Amunt | 4 – 2 | Olímpic La Garriga | Lliçà d'Amunt |
| 12:00 | Juanola 2'; Barea 58', 70'; Jiménez 89' | Report | García 38', 48' | Stadium: Parc del Tenes; Referee: José Manuel Anillo |

| 10 June 2012 | Tiana | 1 – 6 | Vilassar Dalt | Tiana |
| 12:00 | Gómez 1' | Report | Camps 12'; Vives 20'; Viladomiu 30', 44'; Mancheño 59'; Granero 89' | Stadium: Municipal; Referee: Miguel Ángel Navarro |

| 10 June 2012 | Almeda | 0 – 1 | Equipo Ja | Cornellà de Llobregat |
| 12:15 | | Report | Ventura 33' | Stadium: Municipal; Referee: Antonio Pinzano |

| 10 June 2012 | Borges Camp | 0 – 3 | Morell | Les Borges del Camp |
| 18:00 | | Report | Plana 9'; Soriano 25'; Cazorla 41' | Stadium: Municipal; Referee: David Pinel |

==== Third round ====
| 16 June 2012 | Sant Salvador | 0 – 3 | Vila-Roja B | Cercs |
| 17:00 | | Report | Amador 35'; Rodríguez 43'; Sanz 63' | Stadium: Municipal; Referee: Pere Costajusta |

| 16 June 2012 | Roda Barà | 2 – 0 | Morell | Roda de Barà |
| 19:00 | Gargallo 65'; Galera 69' | Report | | Stadium: Municipal; Referee: Rhazli Bouchaib |

| 16 June 2012 | AEM | 4 – 4 | Cervera | Lleida |
| 20:00 | Barbosa 9'; Drudis 22'; Huguet 60', 72' | Report | Gallardo 42'; Luque 45'; Manzambi 73', 90' | Stadium: Recasens; Referee: Ignasi Amor |

| 17 June 2012 | Lliçà d'Amunt | 2 – 2 | Granollers | Lliçà d'Amunt |
| 12:00 | Juanola 33'; Rodríguez 75' | Report | Cosme 20'; Vila 43' | Stadium: Parc del Tenes; Referee: José Antonio Fernández |

| 17 June 2012 | Sant Joan | 0 – 1 | Vilassar Dalt | Montcada i Reixac |
| 12:00 | | Report | Mancheño 24' | Stadium: Municipal; Referee: Óscar Méndez |

| 17 June 2012 | Base Roses | 2 – 2 | Jonquera | Roses |
| 18:00 | Quintos 23'; Bernal 86' | Report | Cayuela 1'; Alabert 84' | Stadium: La Vinyassa; Referee: Ramon Puig |

| 17 June 2012 | Iberia B | 2 – 3 | Equipo Ja | Barcelona |
| 18:00 | Montes 29'; Núñez 88' | Report | Serrano 30', 32'; Gallego 72' | Stadium: La Bàscula; Referee: Julián Haro |

| 17 June 2012 | Olympia II | 2 – 3 | La Guàrdia | Barcelona |
| 19:00 | Massó 60'; Pich-Aguilera 87' | Report | Farré 21', 55'; Reverter 24' | Stadium: Brafa; Referee: Deniz Kizildag |

=== Second phase ===
==== First round ====
Vic received a bye.

| 3 August 2012 | La Guàrdia | 2 – 3 | Cornellà | Sant Vicenç dels Horts |
| 20:00 | Gallardo 24', 34' | Report | Civil 45'; Olivé 74'; Garrós 89' | Stadium: Municipal; Referee: Daniel Herrera |

| 8 August 2012 | Vilassar Dalt | 2 – 1 | Europa | Vilassar de Dalt |
| 19:30 | Fuentes 31'; Álvarez 88' | Report | Gatell 89' | Stadium: Municipal; Referee: David Rovira |

| 11 August 2012 | Vila-Roja B | 3 – 3 | Granollers | Girona |
| 19:00 | Rodríguez 19', 83'; Sanz 35' | Report | Vila 33', 58' | Stadium: Municipal; Referee: Ramon Puig |

| 11 August 2012 | Cervera | 1 – 0 | Balaguer | Cervera |
| 20:00 | Gallardo 64' | Report | | Stadium: Municipal; Referee: Edgar Nula |

| 11 August 2012 | Base Roses | 3 – 2 | Figueres | Roses |
| 20:00 | Ricart 27'; Quintos 30', 37' | Report | Balde 43'; Amigó 79' | Stadium: La Vinyassa; Referee: Javier López |

| 12 August 2012 | Santboià | 0 – 1 | Prat | Sant Boi de Llobregat |
| 12:00 | | Report | López 56' | Stadium: Joan Baptista Milà; Referee: David Congost |

| 12 August 2012 | Equipo Ja | 1 – 2 | Montañesa | Barcelona |
| 18:00 | Guzmán 83' | Report | Puchades 9'; García 75' | Stadium: Municipal; Referee: Xavier Monferrer |

| 12 August 2012 | Vilafranca | 3 – 3 | Castelldefels | Vilafranca del Penedès |
| 18:30 | Delgado 25'; Valerio 59'; Bangweni 80' | Report | Sánchez 31'; Doblas 38'; Amantini 49' | Stadium: Municipal; Referee: Xavier Bertomeu |

| 12 August 2012 | Rapitenca | 1 – 1 | Amposta | Sant Carles de la Ràpita |
| 19:00 | Reverté 10' | Report | Vidal 89' | Stadium: La Devesa; Referee: Oliver Castaño |

| 12 August 2012 | Roda Barà | 2 – 0 | Vilanova | Roda de Barà |
| 19:00 | Piqué 7'; Galera 26' | Report | | Stadium: Municipal; Referee: Marc Bigordà |

| 12 August 2012 | Manlleu | 2 – 2 | Olot | Manlleu |
| 19:00 | Fortet 3'; Fernández 70' | Report | Martínez 35'; Prieto 89' | Stadium: La Vinyassa; Referee: José Francisco Pérez |

| 12 August 2012 | Terrassa | 1 – 0 | Rubí | Terrassa |
| 20:00 | Giménez 74' | Report | | Stadium: Olímpic; Referee: Raúl Calle |

==== Second round ====
| 18 August 2012 | Base Roses | 0 – 2 | Llagostera | Roses |
| 19:30 | | Report | González 65'; Serramitja 70' | Stadium: La Vinyassa; Referee: Sergio Jiménez |

| 18 August 2012 | Vilassar Dalt | 1 – 1 | L'Hospitalet | Vilassar de Dalt |
| 19:45 | Vives 59' | Report | Njié 15' | Stadium: Municipal; Referee: Ramon Comella |

| 18 August 2012 | Cervera | 1 – 2 | Lleida Esportiu | Cervera |
| 20:00 | Gallardo 85' | Report | Alami 24'; Mata 40' | Stadium: Municipal; Referee: Josep Vilaró |

| 19 August 2012 | Amposta | 0 – 3 | Reus | Amposta |
| 18:00 | | Report | Prades 21', 48'; León 81' | Stadium: Municipal; Referee: José Pujol |

| 19 August 2012 | Roda Barà | 2 – 2 | Castelldefels | Roda de Barà |
| 19:00 | Darouich 58', 82' | Report | Henarejos 26'; Muñoz 37' | Stadium: Municipal; Referee: Meritxell Bernat |

| 19 August 2012 | Prat | 1 – 0 | Cornellà | El Prat de Llobregat |
| 19:00 | Larios 81' | Report | | Stadium: Sagnier; Referee: Carlos Rodríguez |

| 19 August 2012 | Montañesa | 0 – 1 | Sant Andreu | Barcelona |
| 19:00 | | Report | Cortés 33' | Stadium: Nou Barris; Referee: Juan Manuel Martín |

| 19 August 2012 | Vila-Roja B | 1 – 3 | Manlleu | Girona |
| 19:00 | Cuéllar 73' | Report | Sala 23'; Fortet 30', 55' | Stadium: Municipal; Referee: Iván Sánchez |

| 19 August 2012 | Terrassa | 3 – 3 | Vic | Terrassa |
| 20:00 | Puga 20', 88'; Fernández 86' | Report | Moreno 6'; Casas 21'; Pla 67' | Stadium: Olímpic; Referee: Rubén Ávalos |

==== Third round ====
L'Hospitalet received a bye.

| 5 September 2012 | Sant Andreu | 0 – 1 | Llagostera | Barcelona |
| 19:00 | | | 9' Serramitja | Stadium: Narcís Sala |

| 5 September 2012 | Reus | 2 – 1 | Lleida Esportiu | Reus |
| 20:00 | Dani Argilaga 30' 62' | | 90+1' Álex Colorado | Stadium: Camp Nou |

| 5 September 2012 | Manlleu | 3 – 0 | Vic | Manlleu |
| 20:30 | Putxi 20'; Manel Sala 46'; Iván Fernández 48' | | | Stadium: Municipal |

| 5 September 2012 | Roda Barà | 0 – 1 | Prat | Roda de Barà |
| 21:00 | | | 41' David López | Stadium: Municipal |

==== Fourth round ====
| 31 October 2012 | Reus | 0 – 3 | Gimnàstic | Reus |
| 20:15 | Nando (yellow card) 16'; Contreras (red card) 81'; David Sangrá (yellow card) 90' | Report | 27' Marcos De La Espada; (yellow card) 54' Fran Vélez; 62' 82' Virgili; (yellow card) 72' Bezares; (red card) 77' Aleix Coch | Stadium: Municipal Camp Nou; Referee: Sánchez Rico |

| 7 November 2012 | Prat | 0 – 0 (3 – 5 p) | L'Hospitalet | El Prat de Llobregat |
| 20:45 | Cazorla (yellow card) 61' | Report | (yellow card) 33' Bacari; (yellow card) 67' Aday | Stadium: Sagnier; Attendance: 300; Referee: Alejandro Fernández Pérez |
| | Penalties |
| | Jaime (penalty missed); Óscar Sierra (penalty scored); Charly Ruiz (penalty scored); Sebas (penalty scored) | | (penalty scored) Osado; (penalty scored) Marc Pedraza; (penalty scored) Barranco; (penalty scored) Aday; (penalty scored) Cirio |

| 14 November 2012 | Llagostera | 2 – 1 | Girona | Llagostera |
| 20:00 | Pitu 16' (yellow card) 50'; Aumatell 67' (yellow card) 68'; Masó (yellow card) 55' | Report | 51' Ion Vélez; (yellow card) 41' Isaac Becerra; (yellow card) 54' Dani Erencia | Stadium: Municipal; Attendance: 500; Referee: Ávalos Martos |

| 28 November 2012 | Manlleu | 2 – 0 | Sabadell | Manlleu |
| 20:15 | Baruc 54' (pen.); Guzmán 85' | Report | (red card) 84' Héctor | Stadium: Municipal; Attendance: 300; Referee: Galán Baró |

==== Semifinals ====
| 20 March 2013 | Manlleu | 0 – 1 | Llagostera | Manlleu |
| 20:30 | Ramón Masó (yellow card) 43'; Manu Moreno (yellow card) 70'; Barragán (yellow card) 82' | Report | (yellow card) 23' Artabe; 26' Enric Pi; (yellow card) 44' Canal; (yellow card) 78' Eloy Gila; (yellow card) 82' Pere Segarra; (yellow card) 86' Masó; (yellow card) 89' Sellarès | Stadium: Municipal; Referee: Robas Bondia |

| 20 March 2013 | Hospitalet | 1 – 1 (4 – 5 p) | Gimnàstic | L'Hospitalet de Llobregat |
| 19:30 | Corominas 18'; Hammouch (yellow card) 46'; Moyano (yellow card) 90' | ReportReport | (yellow card) 38' Fran Vélez; 45+2' David Haro; (yellow card) 76' Joel Coch; (yellow card) 90+2' De Lerma | Stadium: La Feixa Llarga; Attendance: 400; Referee: García Fuster |
| | Penalties |
| | Bacari (penalty missed); Moyano (penalty scored); Viale (penalty scored); Julio Rico (penalty scored); Cirio (penalty scored); Iván Salvador (penalty missed) | | (penalty scored) Virgili; (penalty scored) Mairata; (penalty scored) Fran Vélez; (penalty missed) Joel Coch; (penalty scored) Javi Martínez; (penalty scored) De Lerma |

=== Final phase ===
==== Semifinals ====
17 April 2013
19:00

| Llagostera | 0 – 3 | Espanyol |
|---|---|---|
| | Report; Report | 9' Sergio García; 23', 31' Christian Alfonso |

Nou Estadi, Tarragona
Attendance: 600
Referee: Juan Manuel Vico Moreno

| Llagostera | Espanyol |

Llagostera:
| GK | 13 | (Spain) Wilfred | (substituted off) 71' |
| RB | 5 | (Spain) Barón | (substituted off) 46' |
| CB | 4 | (Spain) Canal |
| CB | 3 | (Spain) Vallho |
| LB | 2 | (Spain) Pere Segarra |
| RM | 11 | (Spain) Tarradellas | (substituted off) 46' |
| CM | 9 | (Spain) Masó | (substituted off) 46' |
| LM | 8 | (Spain) Artabe |
| RF | 10 | (Spain) Aumatell | (substituted off) 69' |
| CF | 9 | (Spain) Nico | (substituted off) 69' |
| LF | 7 | (Spain) Àlex Moreno | (substituted off) 64' |
Substitutes:
| DF | 14 | (Spain) Óscar Álvarez |
| FW | 15 | (Spain) Joaqui | (substituted on) 46' |
| MF | 16 | (Spain) Tito | (substituted on) 46' |
| FW | 17 | (Spain) Enric Pi | (substituted on) 46' |
| FW | 18 | (Spain) Eloy Gila | (substituted on) 69' |
| FW | 19 | (Spain) Sellarès | (substituted on) 69' |
| MF | 20 | (Spain) Jordi Viñas |
| DF | 21 | (Spain) Guillermo |
| GK | 22 | (Spain) Nico Ratti | (substituted on) 71' |
Manager:
(Spain) Josep Oriol Alsina

Espanyol:
| GK | 1 | (Argentina) Cristian Álvarez |
| RB | 16 | (Spain) Javi López | (substituted off) 46' |
| CB | 3 | (Spain) Raúl Rodríguez |
| CB | 15 | (Mexico) Héctor Moreno | (substituted off) 46' |
| LB | 27 | (Spain) Víctor Álvarez |
| DM | 7 | (Spain) Raúl Baena |
| CM | 23 | (Spain) Cristian Gómez | (substituted off) 46' |
| CM | 24 | (Spain) Christian Alfonso |
| RM | 20 | (Portugal) Simão Sabrosa | (substituted off) 56' |
| LM | 17 | (Bulgaria) Martin Petrov | (substituted off) 66' |
| CF | 9 | (Spain) Sergio García | (substituted off) 41' |
Substitutes:
| MF | 4 | (Spain) Víctor Sánchez |
| MF | 5 | (Spain) Sergio Tejera | (substituted on) 46' |
| DF | 6 | (Argentina) Juan Forlín | (substituted on) 46' |
| MF | 10 | (Spain) Joan Verdú | (substituted on) 56' |
| GK | 13 | (Spain) Kiko Casilla |
| DF | 18 | (Spain) Joan Capdevila |
| DF | 19 | (Argentina) Diego Colotto | (substituted on) 46' |
| MF | 22 | (Ghana) Mubarak Wakaso | (substituted on) 66' |
| FW | 34 | (Spain) Cubillas | (substituted on) 41' |
Manager:
(Mexico) Javier Aguirre

Assistant referees:
Andreu Boada Hidalgo
Albert Casas Podadera
Fourth official:
Israel Gómez Hernández

17 April 2013
21:30

| Gimnàstic | 0 – 1 | Barcelona |
|---|---|---|
| | Report; Report | Lombán 14' (pen.) |

Nou Estadi, Tarragona
Referee: Victor Manuel Sánchez Rico

| Gimnàstic | Barcelona |

Gimnàstic:
| GK | 13 | (Spain) Sergio López |
| RB | 20 | (Spain) Jordi Calavera | (substituted off) 65' |
| CB | 14 | (Spain) Aleix Coch |
| CB | 15 | (Spain) Pedro Mairata |
| LB | 21 | (Spain) Ñoño | (substituted off) 67' |
| RM | 11 | (Spain) David Haro | (substituted off) 52' |
| CM | 8 | (Spain) Carlos de Lerma | (substituted off) 65' |
| CM | 23 | (Spain) Joel Coch | (substituted off) 75' |
| LM | 19 | (Spain) Perico | (substituted off) 52' |
| AM | 6 | (Spain) Eugeni |
| CF | 7 | (Spain) Albert Virgili |
Substitutes:
| GK | 1 | (Spain) Rubén Pérez |
| DF | 3 | (Spain) Fran Vélez | (substituted on) 67' |
| FW | 5 | (Spain) Víctor Bertomeu |
| FW | 10 | (Spain) Fran Carbià | (substituted on) 75' |
| MF | 16 | (Spain) José Ángel Bueno | (substituted on) 74' |
| DF | 18 | (Spain) Arnau Tobella | (substituted on) 65' |
| MF | 22 | (Spain) Aarón Bueno | (substituted on) 52' |
| MF | 24 | (Spain) Alfons Serra | (substituted on) 65' |
| FW | 28 | (Spain) Victor Oribe | (substituted on) 52' |
Manager:
(Spain) Javi Salamero

Barcelona:
| GK | 1 | (Spain) Oier Olazábal |
| RB | 19 | (Portugal) Edgar Ié | (substituted off) 85' |
| CB | 3 | (Spain) Sergi Gómez |
| CB | 6 | (Spain) David Lombán |
| LB | 14 | (Spain) Patric |
| DM | 4 | (Spain) Ilie Sánchez |
| CM | 8 | (Spain) Javier Espinosa | (substituted off) 45' |
| CM | 12 | (Brazil) Rafinha | (substituted off) 45' |
| RW | 15 | (Spain) Kiko Femenía | (substituted off) 45' |
| CF | 11 | (Argentina) Sergio Araujo | (substituted off) 60' |
| LW | 7 | (Spain) Joan Àngel Román | (substituted off) 60' |
Substitutes:
| DF | 2 | (Spain) Robert |
| DF | 5 | (Spain) Marc Muniesa |
| FW | 9 | (Spain) Luis Alberto | (substituted on) 45' |
| FW | 10 | (Cameroon) Jean Marie Dongou | (substituted on) 60' |
| GK | 13 | (Spain) Miguel Bañuz |
| DF | 16 | (Cameroon) Frank Bagnack | (substituted on) 45' |
| FW | 17 | (Spain) Adama Traoré | (substituted on) 45' |
| MF | 18 | (Spain) Sergi Samper | (substituted on) 45' |
| MF | 20 | (Portugal) Luis Gustavo | (substituted on) 60' |
Manager:
(Spain) Eusebio Sacristán

Assistant referees:
Ignacio Torrella Fernández
Óscar Gómez Masegosa
Fourth official:
Juan Manuel Martín Varas

== Final ==
29 May 2013
21:30

| Espanyol | 1 – 1 | Barcelona |
|---|---|---|
| Simão 20'; Stuani (red card) 90+5' | Report | 90' Fàbregas; (red card) 90+5' Song |
Penalties
| Wakaso (penalty scored) Petrov (penalty scored) Colotto (penalty missed) Verdú (penalty missed) | 2 – 4 | (penalty missed) Xavi (penalty scored) Fàbregas (penalty scored) Piqué (penalty scored) Alexis (penalty scored) David Villa |

Camp d'Esports, Lleida
Attendance: 12,620
Referee: Alfonso Javier Álvarez Izquierdo

| Espanyol | Barcelona |

Espanyol:
| GK | 13 | (Spain) Kiko Casilla |
| RB | 2 | (Brazil) Felipe Mattioni | (substituted off) 86' |
| CB | 3 | (Spain) Raúl Rodríguez |
| CB | 6 | (Argentina) Juan Forlín |
| LB | 28 | (Spain) Carlos Clerc | (substituted off) 71' |
| DM | 7 | (Spain) Raúl Baena | (substituted off) 90+2' |
| DM | 4 | (Spain) Víctor Sánchez | (substituted off) 46' |
| CM | 23 | (Spain) Cristian Gómez | (substituted off) 71' |
| RW | 20 | (Portugal) Simão Sabrosa | (substituted off) 46' |
| LW | 22 | (Ghana) Mubarak Wakaso |
| CF | 24 | (Spain) Christian Alfonso | (substituted off) 46' |
Substitutes:
| GK | 1 | (Argentina) Cristian Álvarez |
| MF | 5 | (Spain) Sergio Tejera | (substituted on) 46' |
| FW | 8 | (Uruguay) Christian Stuani | (substituted on) 46' |
| FW | 9 | (Spain) Sergio García | (substituted on) 90+2' |
| MF | 10 | (Spain) Joan Verdú | (substituted on) 71' |
| DF | 16 | (Spain) Javi López | (substituted on) 86' |
| MF | 17 | (Bulgaria) Martin Petrov | (substituted on) 46' |
| DF | 18 | (Spain) Joan Capdevila | (substituted on) 71' |
| DF | 19 | (Argentina) Diego Colotto | (substituted on) 46' |
| FW | 34 | (Spain) David Cubillas |
| DF | 36 | (Spain) Jonathan de Amo |
Manager:
(Mexico) Javier Aguirre

Barcelona:
| GK | 1 | (Spain) Oier Olazábal |
| RB | 2 | (Spain) Iván Balliu | (substituted off) 69' |
| CB | 5 | (Spain) Sergi Gómez | (substituted off) 69' |
| CB | 21 | (Brazil) Adriano | (substituted off) 46' |
| LB | 15 | (Spain) Patric |
| DM | 16 | (Spain) Sergio Busquets | (substituted off) 46' |
| CM | 20 | (Spain) Sergi Roberto | (substituted off) 46' |
| CM | 12 | (Mexico) Jonathan dos Santos | (substituted off) 66' |
| RW | 17 | (Spain) Pedro | (substituted off) 46' |
| CF | 24 | (Brazil) Rafinha | (substituted off) 66' |
| LW | 19 | (Spain) Gerard Deulofeu | (substituted off) 66' |
Substitutes:
| GK | 13 | (Spain) José Manuel Pinto |
| DF | 3 | (Spain) Gerard Piqué | (substituted on) 69' |
| CM | 4 | (Spain) Cesc Fàbregas | (substituted on) 66' |
| CM | 6 | (Spain) Xavi | (substituted on) 66' |
| FW | 7 | (Spain) David Villa | (substituted on) 66' |
| FW | 9 | (Chile) Alexis Sánchez | (substituted on) 46' |
| CB | 14 | (Argentina) Javier Mascherano | (substituted on) 46' |
| LB | 18 | (Spain) Jordi Alba | (substituted on) 69' |
| RB | 23 | (Spain) Javier Espinosa | (substituted on) 46' |
| DM | 25 | (Cameroon) Alex Song | (substituted on) 46' (red card) 90+5' |
Manager:
(Spain) Tito Vilanova
