= 2018 Segunda División B play-offs =

Spanish football league play-offs

The 2018 Segunda División B play-offs (Playoffs de Ascenso or Promoción de Ascenso) are the final playoffs for promotion from 2017–18 Segunda División B to the 2018–19 Segunda División. The four first placed teams in each one of the four groups qualify for the promotion playoffs and the four last placed teams in Segunda División are relegated to Segunda División B. It also decides the teams which placed 16th to be relegated to the 2018–19 Tercera División.

== Format ==
The four group winners have the opportunity to promote directly and become the overall Segunda División B champion. The four group winners will be drawn into a two-legged series where the two winners will be promoted to the Segunda División and will enter into the final for the Segunda División B champion. The two losing semifinalists will enter the playoff round for the last two promotion spots.

The four group runners-up will be drawn against one of the three fourth-placed teams outside their group while the four third-placed teams will be drawn against each other in a two-legged series. The six winners will advance with the two losing semifinalists to determine the four teams that will enter the last two-legged series for the last two promotion spots. In all the playoff series, the lower-ranked club will play at home first. Whenever there is a tie in position (e.g. like the group winners in the Semifinal Round and Final or the third-placed teams in the first round), a draw will determine the club to play at home first.

== Controversies about eligibility of teams ==
Despite the ineligibility of Deportivo Fabril for promotion, due to the relegation of Deportivo La Coruña to Segunda División, the reserve team participated in the promotion playoffs. Fuenlabrada and Rápido de Bouzas demanded the Royal Spanish Football Federation to not allow the Galicians to play, by filing a lawsuit.

In another way, some rumours were published in the media about Racing Santander demanding the Federation not allow Sporting Gijón B to play, even though the reserve team of the rojiblancos could be promoted if the main side is promoted to La Liga. However, the Cantabrian club denied that information.

== Group Winners promotion play-off ==
=== Qualified teams ===
Group	Team
1	Rayo Majadahonda
2	Mirandés
3	Mallorca
4	Cartagena

=== Bracket ===
Semifinals
Mallorca	3	0	3
Mirandés	1	0	1
Cartagena	2	0	2
Rayo Majadahonda (a)	1	1	2

Finals
Mallorca	2	1	3
Rayo Majadahonda	1	0	1

=== Matches ===
==== Semifinals ====
Team 1	Agg.	Team 2	1st leg	2nd leg
Cartagena	2–2 (a)	Rayo Majadahonda	2–1	0–1
Mallorca	3–1	Mirandés	3–1	0–0

===== First leg =====
19 May 2018	Cartagena	2–1	Rayo Majadahonda	Cartagena
16:15	Cruz 5'; Aketxe 73'	Report	Coto 45+1'	Stadium: Cartagonova; Attendance: 12,000; Referee: Guzmán Mansilla

20 May 2018	Mallorca	3–1	Mirandés	Palma
12:00	Lago Junior 2'; Raíllo 24'; Ariday 63'	Report	Pito 74'	Stadium: Son Moix; Attendance: 13,780; Referee: Alemán Pérez

===== Second leg =====
27 May 2018	Rayo Majadahonda	1–0 (2–2 agg.)	Cartagena	Majadahonda
12:00	Míchel Zabaco 90+6' (o.g.)	Report		Stadium: Cerro del Espino; Attendance: 3,376; Referee: Román Román

27 May 2018	Mirandés	0–0 (1–3 agg.)	Mallorca	Miranda de Ebro
17:30		Report		Stadium: Anduva; Attendance: 4,885; Referee: Galech Azpeteguía

Promoted to Segunda División
Mallorca (One year later)	Rayo Majadahonda (First time ever)

==== Final ====
Team 1	Agg.	Team 2	1st leg	2nd leg
Mallorca	3–1	Rayo Majadahonda	2–1	1–0

3 June 2018	Mallorca	2–1	Rayo Majadahonda	Palma
12:00	Sabater 51'; Cedric 56'	Report	Jairo Cárcaba 81'	Stadium: Son Moix; Attendance: 3,181; Referee: Leo Ollo

10 June 2018	Rayo Majadahonda	0–1 (1–3 agg.)	Mallorca	Majadahonda
12:00		Report	Xisco Campos 35'	Stadium: Cerro del Espino; Attendance: 2,300; Referee: García Verdura

Segunda División B
2017–18 champions
Mallorca

== Non-champions promotion play-off ==
=== First round ===
==== Qualified teams ====
Group	Position	Team
1	2nd	Deportivo Fabril
2	2nd	Sporting Gijón B
3	2nd	Villarreal B
4	2nd	Marbella

Group	Position	Team
1	3rd	Fuenlabrada
2	3rd	Real Sociedad B
3	3rd	Elche
4	3rd	Murcia

Group	Position	Team
1	4th	Celta B
2	4th	Bilbao Athletic
3	4th	Cornellà
4	4th	Extremadura

==== Matches ====
Team 1	Agg.	Team 2	1st leg	2nd leg
Celta B	2–2 (5–4 p)	Marbella	2–0	0–2 (a.e.t.)
Cornellà	2–4	Sporting Gijón B	2–2	0–2
Bilbao Athletic	3–3 (a)	Villarreal B	1–3	2–0
Extremadura	4–4 (a)	Deportivo Fabril	2–1	2–3 (a.e.t.)
Murcia	2–4	Elche	0–1	2–3
Fuenlabrada	1–1 (a)	Real Sociedad B	0–0	1–1 (a.e.t.)

===== First leg =====
20 May 2018	Celta B	2–0	Marbella	Vigo
12:00	Dražić 14'; Juan Hernández 17'	Report		Stadium: Barreiro; Referee: Pardeiro Puente

20 May 2018	Cornellà	2–2	Sporting Gijón B	Cornellà
12:00	Pere 22'; Rafa Mújica 68'	Report	Claudio 48'; Juan Rodríguez 61'	Stadium: Nou Camp; Referee: Ripoll Solano

20 May 2018	Fuenlabrada	0–0	Real Sociedad B	Fuenlabrada
12:00		Report		Stadium: Fernando Torres; Referee: Cid Camacho

20 May 2018	Bilbao Athletic	1–3	Villarreal B	Bilbao
18:30	Guruzeta 83' (pen.)	Report	Dalmau 45'; Samu 49'; Raba 79'	Stadium: San Mamés; Referee: Ruiz Álvarez

20 May 2018	Murcia	0–1	Elche	Murcia
18:30		Report	Benja 66'	Stadium: Nueva Condomina; Attendance: 22,457; Referee: Calderiña Pavón

20 May 2018	Extremadura	2–1	Deportivo Fabril	Almendralejo
20:00	Gallego 10'; Valverde 16'	Report	Uxío 33'	Stadium: Francisco de la Hera; Attendance: 8,832; Referee: Pérez Muley

===== Second leg =====
26 May 2018	Deportivo Fabril	3–2 (a.e.t.) (4–4 agg.)	Extremadura	Abegondo
17:00	Uxío 12'; Expósito 21'; Lucas 95'	Report	Zarfino 5'; Barrera 107'	Stadium: Mundo de Fútbol; Referee: Vicente Moral

26 May 2018	Real Sociedad B	1–1 (a.e.t.) (1–1 agg.)	Fuenlabrada	Lasarte-Oria
17:00	Celorrio 108'	Report	Bravo 105'	Stadium: José Luis Orbegozo; Referee: Usón Rosel

26 May 2018	Elche	3–2 (4–2 agg.)	Murcia	Elche
17:30	Sánchez 14'; Kaba 26'; Manolín 57' (pen.)	Report	Elady 39' (pen.); Chrisantus 80'	Stadium: Martínez Valero; Attendance: 15,939; Referee: Ávalos Barrera

26 May 2018	Sporting Gijón B	2–0 (4–2 agg.)	Cornellà	Gijón
18:00	Cayarga 3'; Méndez 83'	Report		Stadium: Pepe Ortiz; Referee: González Esteban

26 May 2018	Villarreal B	0–2 (3–3 agg.)	Bilbao Athletic	Villarreal
18:50		Report	Guruzeta 7'; López 21'	Stadium: Mini Estadi; Referee: Alberola Rojas

27 May 2018	Marbella	2–0 (2–2 agg.) (4–5 p)	Celta B	Marbella
12:00	Francis 51', 54'	Report		Stadium: Municipal; Referee: Sánchez López
	Penalties
	Indiano (penalty scored); Francis (penalty scored); Alonso (penalty scored); Bernal (penalty scored); Rioja (penalty missed)		(penalty scored) Hernández; (penalty scored) Molina; (penalty scored) Pastrana; (penalty scored) Álex Serrano; (penalty scored) Agus

=== Second round ===
==== Qualified teams ====
Group	Pos.	Team
2	1st	Mirandés
4	1st	Cartagena

Group	Pos.	Team
2	2nd	Sporting Gijón B
3	2nd	Villarreal B

Group	Pos.	Team
1	3rd	Fuenlabrada
3	3rd	Elche

Group	Pos.	Team
1	4th	Celta B
4	4th	Extremadura

==== Matches ====
Team 1	Agg.	Team 2	1st leg	2nd leg
Extremadura	2–1	Mirandés	0–1	2–0
Celta B	0–1	Cartagena	0–0	0–1
Elche	4–2	Sporting Gijón B	2–1	2–1
Fuenlabrada	0–2	Villarreal B	0–0	0–2

===== First leg =====
2 June 2018	Fuenlabrada	0–0	Villarreal B	Fuenlabrada
18:00		Report		Stadium: Fernando Torres; Referee: Javier Iglesias Villanueva

3 June 2018	Celta B	0–0	Cartagena	Vigo
12:00		Report		Stadium: Barreiro; Referee: Sauleda Torrent

3 June 2018	Extremadura	0–1	Mirandés	Almendralejo
17:00		Report	Yanis 88'	Stadium: Francisco de la Hera; Attendance: 10,473; Referee: Domínguez Cervantes

3 June 2018	Elche	2–1	Sporting Gijón B	Elche
19:00	Nino 76', 90+3'	Report	Cristian 43'	Stadium: Martínez Valero; Attendance: 15,524; Referee: González González

===== Second leg =====
9 June 2018	Mirandés	0–2 (1–2 agg.)	Extremadura	Miranda de Ebro
16:00		Report	Zarfino 45', 78'	Stadium: Anduva; Attendance: 4,365; Referee: Carbajales Gómez

10 June 2018	Villarreal B	2–0 (2–0 agg.)	Fuenlabrada	Villarreal
12:00	Samu 20'; Raba 72'	Report		Stadium: Ciudad Deportiva; Referee: Hernández Maeso

10 June 2018	Sporting Gijón B	1–2 (2–4 agg.)	Elche	Gijón
16:00	Cayarga 75'	Report	Nino 85'; Kaba 90+4'	Stadium: Pepe Ortiz; Referee: Gálvez Rascón

10 June 2018	Cartagena	1–0 (1–0 agg.)	Celta B	Cartagena
18:00	José Gaspar 5'	Report		Stadium: Cartagonova; Attendance: 9,328; Referee: Fernández Vidal

=== Third round ===
==== Qualified teams ====
Group	Pos.	Team
4	1st	Cartagena

Group	Pos.	Team
3	2nd	Villarreal B

Group	Pos.	Team
3	3rd	Elche

Group	Pos.	Team
4	4th	Extremadura

==== Matches ====
Team 1	Agg.	Team 2	1st leg	2nd leg
Elche	3–2	Villarreal B	2–0	1–2
Extremadura	1–0	Cartagena	1–0	0–0

===== First leg =====
16 June 2018	Elche	2–0	Villarreal B	Elche
18:00	Iván Sánchez 32'; Nino 57'	Report		Stadium: Manuel Martínez Valero; Attendance: 20,164; Referee: Del Río Lozano

17 June 2018	Extremadura	1–0	Cartagena	Almendralejo
18:00	Pardo 45+3'			Stadium: Francisco de la Hera; Attendance: 11,580; Referee: Varón Aceitón

===== Second leg =====
23 June 2018	Villarreal B	2–1 (2–3 agg.)	Elche	Villarreal
18:30	Rubén Mesa 44', 90+2'	Report	Benja 15'	Stadium: Ciudad Deportiva; Attendance: 4,200; Referee: Lax Franco

24 June 2018	Cartagena	0–0 (0–1 agg.)	Extremadura	Cartagena
18:30		Report		Stadium: Cartagonova; Attendance: 13,517; Referee: Soto Grado

Promoted to Segunda División
Elche (One year later)	Extremadura (First time ever)

== Relegation play-off ==
=== Qualified teams ===
Group	Position	Team
1	16th	Coruxo
2	16th	Izarra
3	16th	Llagostera
4	16th	Mérida

=== Matches ===
The losers of this tournament will be relegated to the 2018–19 Tercera División.

Team 1	Agg.	Team 2	1st leg	2nd leg
Llagostera	0–1	Izarra	0–0	0–1
Mérida	2–2 (a)	Coruxo	2–2	0–0

==== First leg ====
20 May 2018	Llagostera	0–0	Izarra	Llagostera
12:00		Report		Stadium: Municipal; Referee: Caparrós Hernández

20 May 2018	Mérida	2–2	Coruxo	Mérida
19:00	Mato 11'; Aguilar 54'	Report	Antón 3'; Silva 58'	Stadium: Romano; Referee: Ruipérez Marín

==== Second leg ====
26 May 2018	Coruxo	0–0 (2–2 agg.)	Mérida	Vigo
19:00		Report		Stadium: O Vao; Referee: González Francés

27 May 2018	Izarra	1–0 (1–0 agg.)	Llagostera	Estella-Lizarra
18:00	Bruno 12'	Report		Stadium: Merkatondoa; Referee: Muñiz Ruiz

Relegated to Tercera División
Mérida (3 years later)	Llagostera (7 years later)
