= 2017–18 Segunda División B =

Segunda División B
- Season: 2017–18
- Champions: Mallorca
- Promoted: Mallorca; Rayo Majadahonda; Elche; Extremadura
- Relegated: Toledo; Racing Ferrol; Gimnástica Segoviana; Cerceda; Peña Sport; Lealtad; Osasuna B Caudal; Llagostera; Formentera; Atlético Saguntino; Peña Deportiva; Deportivo Aragón; Mérida; Écija; Córdoba B Betis Deportivo; Lorca Deportiva
- Biggest home win: Bilbao Athletic 8–0 Lealtad (28 April 2018)
- Biggest away win: Lorca Deportiva 0–6 Córdoba B (29 October 2017)
- Highest scoring: Real Unión 5–4 Gernika (22 April 2018)
- Highest attendance: 22,457; Murcia 0–1 Elche (20 May 2018)

The 2017–18 Segunda División B season was the 41st since its establishment. The first matches of the season were played on 20 August 2017, and the season ended June 2018 with the promotion play-off finals.

== Overview before the season ==
80 teams will join the league, including four relegated from the 2016–17 Segunda División and 18 promoted from the 2016–17 Tercera División. The composition of the groups was determined by the Royal Spanish Football Federation, attending to geographical criteria.

Relegated from Segunda División

- UCAM Murcia
- Mallorca
- Elche
- Mirandés

Promoted from Tercera División

- Atlético Madrid B
- Deportivo Aragón
- Badajoz
- Cerceda (Note: Paid for the vacant berth of Boiro, which was relegated due to unpaid debts to their players.)
- Écija
- Fabril (Note: Officially changed its name from Deportivo La Coruña B.)
- Formentera
- Gimnástica Segoviana
- Las Palmas Atlético
- Lorca Deportiva
- Olot
- Ontinyent
- Peña Deportiva (Note: Administratively promoted to replace Mallorca B.)
- Peña Sport
- Peralada (Note: Paid for the vacant berth of Gavà, which was relegated due to unpaid debts to their players.)
- Rápido de Bouzas
- Real Betis B
- Sporting Gijón B
- Talavera de la Reina
- Unión Adarve
- Vitoria

== Group 1 ==
Location of teams in 2017–18 Segunda División B Group 1

=== Teams and locations ===
Team	Home city	Stadium	Capacity
Atlético Madrid B	Madrid	Cerro del Espino	3,376
Celta B	Vigo	Barreiro	4,500
Cerceda	Cerceda	O Roxo	2,500
Coruxo	Vigo	O Vao	1,200
Deportivo Fabril	A Coruña	El Mundo del Fútbol	1,000
Fuenlabrada	Fuenlabrada	Fernando Torres	2,500
Gimnástica Segoviana	Segovia	La Albuera	6,500
Guijuelo	Guijuelo	Municipal	1,500
Navalcarnero	Navalcarnero	Mariano González	1,571
Ponferradina	Ponferrada	El Toralín	8,800
Pontevedra	Pontevedra	Pasarón	12,000
Racing Ferrol	Ferrol	A Malata	12,042
Rápido de Bouzas	Vigo	Baltasar Pujales	1,500
Rayo Majadahonda	Majadahonda	Cerro del Espino	3,376
Real Madrid Castilla	Madrid	Alfredo di Stéfano	12,000
San Sebastián de los Reyes	San Sebastián de los Reyes	Matapiñonera	3,000
Talavera de la Reina	Talavera de la Reina	El Prado	6,000
Toledo	Toledo	Salto del Caballo	5,300
Unión Adarve	Madrid	Vicente del Bosque	1,000
Valladolid B	Valladolid	Anexos José Zorrilla	1,500

=== League table ===
Pos	Team	Pld	W	D	L	GF	GA	GD	Pts	Qualification or relegation
1	Rayo Majadahonda (O, P)	38	20	10	8	60	35	+25	70	Qualification for the group champions' playoffs and Copa del Rey
2	Deportivo Fabril	38	20	9	9	46	28	+18	69	Qualification for the promotion playoffs
3	Fuenlabrada	38	17	14	7	56	31	+25	65	Qualification for the promotion playoffs and Copa del Rey
4	Celta Vigo B	38	18	9	11	44	32	+12	63	Qualification for the promotion playoffs
5	Rápido de Bouzas	38	15	16	7	39	28	+11	61 (Note: Rápido de Bouzas finished ahead of Navalcarnero on head-to-head points: Navalcarnero–Rápido de Bouzas 0–1, Rápido de Bouzas–Navalcarnero 0–0)	Qualification for the Copa del Rey
6	Navalcarnero	38	18	7	13	44	40	+4	61	Qualification for the Copa del Rey
7	Talavera de la Reina	38	15	11	12	40	46	−6	56	Qualification for the Copa del Rey
8	Real Madrid Castilla	38	14	13	11	53	37	+16	55	
9	San Sebastián de los Reyes	38	13	12	13	45	46	−1	51 (Note: Head-to-head points: San Sebastián de los Reyes 7 pts, Atlético Madrid B 7 pts, Unión Adarve 2 pts. San Sebastián de los Reyes finished ahead of Atlético Madrid B on overall goal difference.)	
10	Atlético Madrid B	38	12	15	11	43	46	−3	51	
11	Unión Adarve	38	13	12	13	43	46	−3	51	
12	Ponferradina	38	12	12	14	53	50	+3	48	
13	Guijuelo	38	10	15	13	34	34	0	45 (Note: Guijuelo finished ahead of Pontevedra on overall goal difference.)	
14	Pontevedra	38	11	12	15	45	46	−1	45	
15	Valladolid B	38	10	14	14	41	48	−7	44	
16	Coruxo (O)	38	12	7	19	37	57	−20	43	Qualification for the relegation playoffs
17	Toledo (R)	38	10	11	17	45	50	−5	41	Relegation to Tercera División
18	Racing Ferrol (R)	38	9	13	16	38	53	−15	40	Relegation to Tercera División
19	Gimnástica Segoviana (R)	38	9	12	17	33	50	−17	39	Relegation to Tercera División
20	Cerceda (Note: Cerceda was demoted to Preferente Autonómica due to financial difficulties.) (R)	38	5	10	23	26	62	−36	25	Relegation to Preferente Autonómica

Source: BDFútbol
Rules for classification: 1) points; 2) head-to-head points; 3) head-to-head goal difference; 4) goal difference; 5) number of goals scored
(O) Play-off winners; (P) Promoted; (R) Relegated

=== Results ===
Home \ Away	ATM	CEL	CER	COR	FAB	FUE	GIM	GUI	NAV	PNF	PNT	RFE	RAP	RAY	RMC	SSR	TAL	TOL	UAD	VAD
Atlético Madrid B	—	1–1	3–0	3–0	1–4	0–2	3–1	1–1	0–1	2–1	0–2	2–2	1–1	0–0	0–0	1–0	2–2	1–2	2–1	2–1
Celta B	0–1	—	3–0	0–0	0–0	2–1	2–2	4–1	1–0	1–0	2–1	1–0	2–1	3–0	1–4	1–0	1–1	1–0	3–1	0–0
Cerceda	1–1	0–0	—	1–2	2–3	1–1	0–1	0–4	0–1	1–1	1–0	1–1	0–0	1–1	0–2	0–3	0–2	1–1	1–0	0–3
Coruxo	1–2	0–1	3–2	—	1–0	0–2	1–1	1–0	1–3	1–0	1–1	3–3	1–0	1–2	0–3	2–2	0–0	0–1	1–0	1–0
Deportivo Fabril	3–0	1–3	1–0	3–1	—	1–2	0–0	0–0	1–0	2–0	1–0	1–1	0–0	1–0	3–0	0–1	3–0	2–0	2–1	1–0
Fuenlabrada	1–1	2–0	1–0	7–0	1–2	—	1–1	1–0	2–2	0–3	2–0	4–0	0–0	0–0	0–0	2–1	6–0	0–2	1–1	0–0
Gimnástica Segoviana	0–2	0–0	1–2	0–2	1–0	1–2	—	2–1	1–0	0–0	3–0	1–1	1–2	0–0	2–0	2–0	2–0	0–0	1–2	0–1
Guijuelo	0–0	1–0	0–1	2–0	0–1	0–2	0–0	—	0–1	1–0	3–3	0–1	0–0	0–0	1–1	1–1	0–0	2–1	3–1	2–1
Navalcarnero	1–1	2–0	2–1	1–0	1–2	1–0	2–1	2–2	—	0–0	0–2	1–0	0–1	0–2	2–1	2–4	4–0	2–1	0–1	1–0
Ponferradina	1–1	1–2	2–1	2–1	0–1	2–1	4–0	3–0	2–3	—	1–0	0–0	2–2	4–0	3–2	1–3	2–2	1–4	4–0	1–1
Pontevedra	0–1	1–1	2–0	2–1	2–2	3–1	0–0	1–1	1–1	2–2	—	3–0	1–2	0–3	2–0	3–0	4–0	3–3	0–0	1–1
Racing Ferrol	3–0	0–3	0–0	1–0	1–1	0–1	2–0	0–2	0–1	2–1	1–2	—	1–0	3–3	1–3	4–1	0–3	1–0	1–2	2–2
Rápido de Bouzas	1–1	2–1	1–1	2–0	0–2	1–2	2–1	1–0	0–0	4–1	2–0	1–1	—	1–0	0–0	0–0	1–1	1–0	1–0	1–1
Rayo Majadahonda	2–0	2–0	2–1	1–2	0–1	0–0	4–2	1–1	2–1	1–1	2–0	2–1	1–0	—	3–1	3–1	0–0	3–0	3–1	6–2
Real Madrid Castilla	1–1	0–1	4–2	2–0	2–0	1–1	0–0	0–0	2–3	1–1	3–0	3–0	3–0	1–2	—	0–0	2–0	1–1	1–1	4–1
San Sebastián de los Reyes	3–2	1–0	3–0	2–4	0–0	1–1	0–2	0–2	4–1	2–0	1–0	0–0	0–1	1–3	1–1	—	0–0	1–1	2–2	1–1
Talavera de la Reina	2–0	3–0	1–0	1–1	2–0	0–1	3–0	1–0	1–0	2–0	2–1	0–1	0–2	0–3	2–1	2–1	—	1–1	2–0	2–1
Toledo	1–0	1–0	2–3	1–0	0–0	3–4	6–1	1–1	1–2	1–2	1–0	2–1	1–3	1–2	0–1	0–1	2–2	—	1–3	0–0
Unión Adarve	2–2	1–0	3–1	1–0	3–0	1–1	3–1	0–2	0–0	3–4	0–0	1–1	1–1	1–0	1–0	0–1	1–0	2–1	—	1–1
Valladolid B	1–2	0–3	1–0	2–4	2–1	0–0	2–1	1–0	2–0	0–0	1–2	2–1	1–1	2–1	1–2	1–2	3–0	1–1	1–1	—

Source: BDFútbol
Legend: Blue = home team win; Yellow = draw; Red = away team win.

=== Top goalscorers ===
As of 13 May 2018

Goalscorers	Goals	Team
(Spain) Dioni Villalba	21	Fuenlabrada
(Brazil) Yuri de Souza	20	Ponferradina
(Spain) Juan Hernández	14	Celta B
(Spain) Diego Silva	13	Coruxo
(Spain) Héctor Gómez	12	Unión Adarve

=== Top goalkeepers ===
As of 13 May 2018

Goalkeeper	Goals	Matches	Average	Team
(Spain) Brais Pereiro	28	38	0.74	Rápido de Bouzas
(Spain) Dani Sotres	24	30	0.8	Celta B
(Spain) Kike Royo	29	33	0.88	Guijuelo
(Spain) Isma Gil	29	32	0.91	Navalcarnero
(Spain) Basilio Sancho	34	37	0.92	Rayo Majadahonda

== Group 2 ==
Location of teams in 2017–18 Segunda División B Group 2

=== Teams and locations ===
Team	Home city	Stadium	Capacity
Amorebieta	Amorebieta-Etxano	Urritxe	3,000
Arenas	Getxo	Gobela	1,221
Barakaldo	Barakaldo	Lasesarre	7,960
Bilbao Athletic	Bilbao	Lezama	2,500
Burgos	Burgos	El Plantío	12,200
Caudal	Mieres	Hermanos Antuña	2,850
Gernika	Guernica	Urbieta	3,000
Izarra	Estella-Lizarra	Merkatondoa	3,500
Lealtad	Villaviciosa	Les Caleyes	3,000
Leioa	Leioa	Sarriena	3,500
Mirandés	Miranda de Ebro	Anduva	5,759
Osasuna B	Pamplona	Tajonar	4,000
Peña Sport	Tafalla	San Francisco	3,000
Racing Santander	Santander	El Sardinero	22,222
Real Sociedad B	San Sebastián	José Luis Orbegozo	2,500
Real Unión	Irun	Stadium Gal	6,344
Sporting Gijón B	Gijón	Pepe Ortiz	3,000
Tudelano	Tudela	Ciudad de Tudela	11,000
UD Logroñés	Logroño	Las Gaunas	16,000
Vitoria	Vitoria-Gasteiz	Olaranbe	4,000

=== League table ===
Pos	Team	Pld	W	D	L	GF	GA	GD	Pts	Qualification or relegation
1	Mirandés	38	23	7	8	53	33	+20	76	Qualification for the group champions' playoffs and Copa del Rey
2	Sporting Gijón B	38	22	9	7	61	36	+25	75	Qualification for the promotion playoffs
3	Real Sociedad B	38	22	8	8	49	24	+25	74	Qualification for the promotion playoffs
4	Bilbao Athletic	38	21	10	7	67	27	+40	73	Qualification for the promotion playoffs
5	Racing Santander	38	20	8	10	44	33	+11	68	Qualification for the Copa del Rey
6	Barakaldo	38	16	15	7	50	28	+22	63	Qualification for the Copa del Rey
7	UD Logroñés	38	17	10	11	55	35	+20	61	Qualification for the Copa del Rey
8	Gernika	38	16	11	11	46	41	+5	59	Qualification for the Copa del Rey
9	Tudelano	38	13	14	11	38	32	+6	53	
10	Leioa	38	13	12	13	47	42	+5	51 (Note: Leioa finished ahead of Burgos on head-to-head points: Burgos–Leioa 1–1, Leioa–Burgos 1–0)	
11	Burgos	38	12	15	11	28	28	0	51	
12	Arenas	38	9	19	10	46	43	+3	46 (Note: Arenas finished ahead of Real Unión on overall goal difference)	
13	Real Unión	38	12	10	16	32	46	−14	46	
14	Amorebieta	38	10	14	14	44	46	−2	44	
15	Vitoria	38	10	13	15	40	44	−4	43	
16	Izarra (O)	38	10	9	19	32	58	−26	39	Qualification for the relegation playoffs
17	Peña Sport (R)	38	8	11	19	32	62	−30	35	Relegation to Tercera División
18	Lealtad (R)	38	6	10	22	26	60	−34	28	Relegation to Tercera División
19	Osasuna B (R)	38	5	9	24	25	63	−38	24	Relegation to Tercera División
20	Caudal (R)	38	3	10	25	19	53	−34	19	Relegation to Tercera División

Source: BDFútbol
Rules for classification: 1) points; 2) head-to-head points; 3) head-to-head goal difference; 4) goal difference; 5) number of goals scored
(O) Play-off winners; (R) Relegated

=== Results ===
Home \ Away	AMO	ARE	BAR	BAT	BUR	CAU	GER	IZA	LEA	LEI	MIR	OSA	PSP	RSA	RSO	RUN	SPO	TUD	LOG	VIT
Amorebieta	—	3–1	2–2	0–3	1–0	0–4	1–2	5–0	1–2	3–2	0–1	3–1	4–1	1–0	2–3	0–0	3–0	1–2	1–3	2–0
Arenas	1–1	—	1–1	2–2	0–0	2–1	0–0	1–1	3–1	1–1	1–1	3–0	1–0	3–1	0–0	1–1	0–1	1–2	0–0	3–2
Barakaldo	1–1	0–0	—	1–1	2–2	2–1	2–0	5–0	4–0	3–0	1–0	3–0	2–0	2–0	2–0	2–0	2–1	1–1	0–0	1–1
Bilbao Athletic	1–1	1–0	1–0	—	3–1	2–0	0–0	6–1	8–0	1–0	2–1	2–0	4–1	3–0	2–0	4–0	1–1	2–0	1–2	1–0
Burgos	0–0	1–0	0–0	1–1	—	1–0	0–0	2–0	2–1	1–1	1–1	1–0	3–0	1–1	0–0	0–0	1–1	0–1	1–0	1–0
Caudal	0–0	0–2	0–1	1–2	0–0	—	0–0	1–1	1–0	0–0	1–3	0–0	0–2	0–2	0–0	0–0	0–1	0–2	0–3	1–1
Gernika	0–0	2–1	0–0	3–0	1–0	2–0	—	2–0	1–0	2–2	1–1	3–1	3–1	1–3	0–4	1–0	3–5	1–1	0–1	2–2
Izarra	2–0	2–2	1–0	2–2	2–1	1–0	0–1	—	1–1	0–0	0–1	3–0	0–1	0–0	0–3	2–0	1–0	1–2	0–2	0–1
Lealtad	0–0	2–2	0–1	0–1	0–1	2–1	0–0	1–0	—	0–3	0–1	2–2	1–1	1–2	0–1	1–0	2–3	0–0	2–1	1–1
Leioa	0–1	0–1	3–1	1–0	1–0	3–2	1–3	1–2	1–0	—	1–1	2–1	3–0	0–1	0–2	0–0	1–2	1–0	3–3	2–2
Mirandés	0–0	2–1	2–1	1–1	1–1	2–0	1–0	4–3	2–0	1–2	—	2–1	1–0	0–1	0–2	1–0	1–0	3–2	1–0	4–2
Osasuna B	1–1	1–1	0–1	0–3	0–1	0–0	2–4	0–1	3–2	2–1	1–0	—	0–0	1–2	0–3	1–0	0–1	1–1	0–0	1–2
Peña Sport	2–2	3–3	0–1	1–1	2–0	2–0	0–1	0–1	3–1	1–5	1–3	1–0	—	1–1	1–3	0–1	1–6	1–0	1–1	1–2
Racing Santander	2–0	1–0	3–2	1–0	1–0	2–0	1–0	1–0	1–0	0–0	0–1	2–0	2–0	—	0–0	0–2	1–2	1–1	2–1	4–1
Real Sociedad B	1–0	1–0	3–1	0–3	0–1	1–0	0–1	2–0	1–0	0–0	0–1	0–0	1–1	3–0	—	2–0	2–1	4–3	2–0	1–0
Real Unión	3–1	2–2	1–1	1–0	1–0	2–0	5–4	1–0	3–1	1–3	0–3	1–3	0–0	1–3	0–0	—	1–1	1–2	1–0	1–0
Sporting Gijón B	1–1	3–2	2–0	0–0	3–1	3–1	1–0	3–1	1–1	1–0	3–1	3–1	1–1	3–1	0–1	2–1	—	1–1	1–0	1–0
Tudelano	1–1	0–1	0–0	0–1	0–0	3–1	1–2	0–0	0–0	1–0	1–0	2–0	0–1	0–0	1–2	3–0	1–0	—	0–0	1–0
UD Logroñés	1–0	1–1	1–1	3–1	2–0	1–2	3–0	5–2	0–1	2–2	1–2	2–1	3–0	2–1	3–1	2–0	1–2	2–1	—	3–1
Vitoria	2–1	2–2	0–0	1–0	1–2	3–1	1–0	1–1	3–0	0–1	1–2	4–0	1–1	0–0	1–0	0–1	0–0	1–1	0–0	—

Source: BDFútbol
Legend: Blue = home team win; Yellow = draw; Red = away team win.

=== Top goalscorers ===
As of 13 May 2018

Goalscorers	Goals	Team
(Spain) Diego Cervero	23	Mirandés
(Spain) Ander Vitoria	17	Barakaldo
(Spain) Gorka Guruzeta	16	Bilbao Athletic
(Spain) Rayco García	16	UD Logroñés
(Spain) Jon Ander Pérez	15	Amorebieta

=== Top goalkeepers ===
As of 13 May 2018

Goalkeeper	Goals	Matches	Average	Team
(Spain) Andoni Zubiaurre	15	29	0.52	Real Sociedad B
(Spain) Unai Simón	18	29	0.62	Bilbao Athletic
(Spain) Txusta	22	34	0.65	Barakaldo
(Spain) Mikel Saizar	28	38	0.74	Burgos
(Spain) Mikel Pagola	31	37	0.84	Tudelano

== Group 3 ==
Location of teams in 2017–18 Segunda División B Group 3

=== Teams and locations ===
Team	Home city	Stadium	Capacity
Alcoyano	Alcoy	El Collao	4,880
Atlético Saguntino	Sagunto	Morvedre	4,000
Atlético Baleares	Palma	Son Malferit	1,000
Badalona	Badalona	Municipal	4,170
Cornellà	Cornellà de Llobregat	Nou Camp	1,500
Deportivo Aragón	Zaragoza	Ciudad Deportiva	2,500
Ebro	Zaragoza	El Carmen	1,200
Elche	Elche	Manuel Martínez Valero	36,017
Formentera	Sant Francesc Xavier	Municipal	1,000
Hércules	Alicante	José Rico Pérez	30,000
Llagostera	Llagostera	Municipal	1,000
Lleida Esportiu	Lleida	Camp d'Esports	13,000
Mallorca	Palma	Iberostar Estadi	23,142
Olot	Olot	Municipal	5,000
Ontinyent	Ontinyent	El Clariano	5,000
Peña Deportiva	Santa Eulària des Riu	Municipal	1,500
Peralada	Peralada	Municipal	1,500
Sabadell	Sabadell	Nova Creu Alta	11,981
Valencia Mestalla	Valencia	Antonio Puchades	3,000
Villarreal B	Villarreal	Pamesa Cerámica	5,000

=== League table ===
Pos	Team	Pld	W	D	L	GF	GA	GD	Pts	Qualification or relegation
1	Mallorca (C, O, P)	38	20	13	5	52	27	+25	73	Qualification for the group champions' playoffs and Copa del Rey
2	Villarreal B	38	16	17	5	46	29	+17	65	Qualification for the promotion playoffs
3	Elche (O, P)	38	16	15	7	56	32	+24	63	Qualification for the promotion playoffs and Copa del Rey
4	Cornellà	38	17	9	12	46	39	+7	60	Qualification for the promotion playoffs and Copa del Rey
5	Ontinyent	38	15	11	12	30	37	−7	56 (Note: Ontinyent finished ahead of Ebro on head-to-head points: Ebro–Ontinyent 0–2, Ontinyent–Ebro 2–1)	Qualification for the Copa del Rey
6	Ebro	38	14	14	10	35	35	0	56	Qualification for the Copa del Rey
7	Lleida Esportiu	38	14	13	11	37	33	+4	55 (Note: Lleida Esportiu finished ahead of Badalona on head-to-head points: Badalona–Lleida Esportiu 1–1, Lleida Esportiu–Badalona 2–0)	Qualification for the Copa del Rey
8	Badalona	38	14	13	11	38	36	+2	55	Qualification for the Copa del Rey
9	Peralada	38	13	13	12	38	33	+5	52	
10	Hércules	38	11	18	9	39	31	+8	51	
11	Valencia Mestalla	38	11	17	10	60	53	+7	50	
12	Sabadell	38	9	22	7	31	29	+2	49 (Note: Sabadell finished ahead of Alcoyano on head-to-head points: Sabadell–Alcoyano 2–0, Alcoyano–Sabadell 0–0)	
13	Alcoyano	38	11	16	11	32	29	+3	49	
14	Atlético Baleares	38	10	14	14	33	38	−5	44	
15	Olot	38	9	16	13	34	38	−4	43	
16	Llagostera (R)	38	10	12	16	31	41	−10	42	Qualification for the relegation playoffs
17	Formentera (R)	38	9	14	15	25	41	−16	41	Relegation to Tercera División
18	Atlético Saguntino (R)	38	10	10	18	35	46	−11	40	Relegation to Tercera División
19	Peña Deportiva (R)	38	8	12	18	26	41	−15	36	Relegation to Tercera División
20	Deportivo Aragón (R)	38	3	11	24	33	69	−36	20	Relegation to Tercera División

Source: BDFútbol
Rules for classification: 1) points; 2) head-to-head points; 3) head-to-head goal difference; 4) goal difference; 5) number of goals scored
(C) Champions; (O) Play-off winners; (P) Promoted; (R) Relegated

=== Results ===
Home \ Away	ALC	ATB	SAG	BAD	COR	ARA	EBR	ELC	FOR	HER	LLA	LLE	MLL	OLO	ONT	PDE	PER	SAB	MES	VIL
Alcoyano	—	0–0	3–1	2–1	1–2	3–2	0–1	1–1	0–0	1–1	0–1	1–1	0–2	3–1	0–0	3–0	0–2	0–0	0–1	1–1
Atlético Baleares	1–0	—	2–2	0–0	1–2	2–0	3–1	1–1	1–0	1–0	0–1	1–1	0–0	1–1	3–1	0–0	0–0	1–1	1–1	0–1
Atlético Saguntino	1–0	0–1	—	1–2	0–1	2–1	1–0	1–1	0–0	0–1	1–1	1–0	1–2	1–1	1–2	2–0	0–1	1–1	2–3	1–1
Badalona	0–0	3–0	0–0	—	3–0	5–2	1–2	1–3	1–1	0–0	1–0	1–1	1–1	1–0	1–0	4–1	1–0	1–0	2–0	0–0
Cornellà	0–1	1–0	1–2	1–0	—	2–1	2–0	0–1	4–1	1–0	0–1	1–0	3–1	0–1	1–0	1–0	0–2	3–0	2–2	3–0
Deportivo Aragón	0–2	1–2	1–0	0–1	0–0	—	0–0	0–4	2–1	0–3	0–1	1–2	0–1	0–2	1–1	0–1	1–1	1–1	0–2	1–4
Ebro	0–0	2–1	2–2	2–2	2–1	2–0	—	1–1	0–1	1–0	0–0	1–1	0–2	2–1	0–2	2–1	0–0	1–0	1–0	2–2
Elche	0–2	3–3	1–0	5–1	3–0	5–1	2–1	—	0–1	1–1	2–0	2–0	0–0	2–1	1–0	2–0	4–1	0–1	2–2	0–0
Formentera	0–0	0–2	0–1	2–1	1–1	2–1	0–0	0–1	—	1–1	0–2	1–0	1–1	1–1	1–2	0–1	1–0	1–3	1–1	0–0
Hércules	1–2	2–1	1–2	1–1	1–1	3–1	0–0	0–0	1–0	—	2–2	0–0	1–1	1–1	1–1	1–0	3–2	2–0	4–0	0–0
Llagostera	0–1	1–0	1–0	1–2	1–1	2–2	1–2	2–1	0–1	0–1	—	2–3	0–0	2–1	1–2	0–0	0–0	0–2	2–2	2–2
Lleida Esportiu	1–0	1–0	0–1	2–0	4–2	1–1	1–0	1–1	0–1	0–0	1–0	—	0–2	1–0	4–0	2–1	1–1	0–0	3–2	0–0
Mallorca	1–0	3–2	3–2	3–1	3–0	2–2	0–1	2–0	1–1	1–1	4–0	3–2	—	3–1	1–0	1–0	0–0	0–0	2–1	1–0
Olot	1–1	1–0	2–0	2–0	1–3	1–1	0–0	2–2	0–0	1–1	1–2	2–1	0–0	—	2–0	1–1	0–0	0–2	1–0	0–0
Ontinyent	0–0	0–0	1–0	1–0	0–0	0–5	2–1	1–0	3–0	1–0	1–0	0–1	0–1	1–0	—	1–0	1–0	0–0	1–1	0–1
Peña Deportiva	0–0	2–0	3–1	0–1	1–1	2–2	1–1	0–1	0–1	1–0	1–1	0–0	2–1	1–0	0–1	—	0–1	1–1	1–0	0–1
Peralada	0–0	0–0	0–2	2–0	1–2	2–1	1–2	1–0	3–0	2–0	1–0	0–1	0–1	0–0	0–0	2–0	—	3–2	2–2	1–2
Sabadell	2–0	1–0	0–0	0–0	0–0	1–0	0–0	0–0	1–1	1–1	2–1	0–0	1–0	1–2	2–2	1–1	2–2	—	1–1	1–1
Valencia Mestalla	3–3	1–2	4–1	0–0	3–3	1–1	1–2	3–3	2–0	1–2	1–0	3–0	2–1	1–1	2–2	1–1	4–1	2–0	—	2–0
Villarreal B	0–1	3–0	2–1	0–0	2–0	2–0	2–0	0–0	3–2	2–1	0–0	1–0	1–1	2–1	5–0	3–2	0–3	0–0	2–2	—

Source: BDFútbol
Legend: Blue = home team win; Yellow = draw; Red = away team win.

=== Top goalscorers ===
As of 13 May 2018

Goalscorers	Goals	Team
(Spain) Enric Gallego	18	Cornellà
(Spain) Rafa Mir	15	Valencia Mestalla
(Spain) Abdón Prats	12	Mallorca
(Spain) Benja Martínez	12	Elche
(Spain) Nino Martínez	12	Elche

=== Top goalkeepers ===
As of 13 May 2018

Goalkeeper	Goals	Matches	Average	Team
(Spain) Manolo Reina	27	35	0.77	Mallorca
(Spain) Ismael Falcón	29	37	0.78	Hércules
(Spain) Roberto Gutiérrez	29	37	0.78	Sabadell
(Spain) Miguel Bañuz	23	29	0.79	Alcoyano
(Spain) José Juan Figueras	29	36	0.81	Elche

== Group 4 ==
Location of teams in 2017–18 Segunda División B Group 4
Location of teams in 2017–18 Segunda División B Group 4 (Canary Islands)

=== Teams and locations ===
Team	Home city	Stadium	Capacity
Badajoz	Badajoz	Nuevo Vivero	15,198
Betis Deportivo	Seville	Ciudad Deportiva Luis del Sol	4,000
Cartagena	Cartagena	Cartagonova	15,105
Córdoba B	Córdoba	Rafael Gómez	3,000
Écija	Écija	San Pablo	6,000
El Ejido	El Ejido	Santo Domingo	7,870
Extremadura	Almendralejo	Francisco de la Hera	11,580
Granada B	Granada	Miguel Prieto	2,500
Jumilla	Jumilla	La Hoya	3,000
Las Palmas Atlético	Las Palmas	Anexo Gran Canaria	500
Linense	La Línea de la Concepción	Municipal	12,000
Lorca Deportiva	Lorca	Francisco Artés Carrasco	8,120
Marbella	Marbella	Municipal	8,000
Melilla	Melilla	Álvarez Claro	12,000
Mérida	Mérida	Romano	14,600
Murcia	Murcia	Nueva Condomina	31,179
Recreativo	Huelva	Nuevo Colombino	21,670
San Fernando	San Fernando	Iberoamericano	12,000
UCAM Murcia	Murcia	La Condomina	6,000
Villanovense	Villanueva de la Serena	Villanovense	2,500

=== League table ===
Pos	Team	Pld	W	D	L	GF	GA	GD	Pts	Qualification or relegation
1	Cartagena	38	20	11	7	51	33	+18	71	Qualification for the group champions' playoffs and Copa del Rey
2	Marbella	38	20	10	8	49	27	+22	70	Qualification for the promotion playoffs and Copa del Rey
3	Murcia	38	18	11	9	49	33	+16	65	Qualification for the promotion playoffs and Copa del Rey
4	Extremadura (O, P)	38	17	9	12	59	38	+21	60 (Note: Extremadura finished ahead of Melilla on head-to-head points: Melilla–Extremadura 0–0, Extremadura–Melilla 1–0)	Qualification for the promotion playoffs and Copa del Rey
5	Melilla	38	17	9	12	43	24	+19	60	Qualification for the Copa del Rey
6	Villanovense	38	14	12	12	29	33	−4	54	
7	UCAM Murcia	38	13	13	12	38	42	−4	52	
8	Granada B	38	13	12	13	34	35	−1	51	
9	San Fernando	38	12	13	13	47	46	+1	49 (Note: San Fernando finished ahead of El Ejido on head-to-head points: El Ejido–San Fernando 1–1, San Fernando–El Ejido 4–2)	
10	El Ejido	38	12	13	13	54	55	−1	49	
11	Linense	38	11	15	12	44	37	+7	48 (Note: Linense finished ahead of Badajoz on head-to-head points: Badajoz–Linense 1–1, Linense–Badajoz 2–0)	
12	Badajoz	38	12	12	14	46	44	+2	48	
13	Jumilla	38	11	14	13	30	42	−12	47 (Note: Jumilla finished ahead of Las Palmas Atlético and Recreativo on head-to-head points: Jumilla 12 pts, Las Palmas Atlético 4 pts, Recreativo 1 pt)	
14	Las Palmas Atlético	38	12	11	15	45	44	+1	47	
15	Recreativo	38	12	11	15	33	36	−3	47	
16	Mérida (R)	38	11	13	14	34	42	−8	46	Qualification for the relegation playoffs
17	Écija (R)	38	11	12	15	38	56	−18	45	Relegation to Tercera División
18	Córdoba B (R)	38	11	10	17	40	51	−11	43	Relegation to Tercera División
19	Betis Deportivo (R)	38	9	13	16	47	61	−14	40	Relegation to Tercera División
20	Lorca Deportiva (R)	38	8	8	22	33	64	−31	32	Relegation to Tercera División

Source: BDFútbol
Rules for classification: 1) points; 2) head-to-head points; 3) head-to-head goal difference; 4) goal difference; 5) number of goals scored
(O) Play-off winners; (P) Promoted; (R) Relegated

=== Results ===
Home \ Away	BAD	BET	CAR	COR	ECI	EJI	EXT	GRA	JUM	LPA	LIN	LOR	MAR	MEL	MER	MUR	REC	SFE	UCM	VNV
Badajoz	—	4–1	0–0	3–0	3–0	3–0	1–0	1–0	2–0	3–1	1–1	1–0	1–1	0–2	4–2	2–3	1–1	2–2	0–0	1–1
Betis Deportivo	3–1	—	0–1	4–0	3–3	2–0	0–4	1–2	3–3	0–0	3–2	4–1	1–1	1–1	0–0	0–0	2–0	2–2	1–0	1–2
Cartagena	1–0	1–4	—	0–0	0–0	3–0	3–2	1–1	3–0	1–1	1–0	2–0	0–1	2–1	0–0	2–1	3–2	3–1	3–2	0–0
Córdoba B	1–1	0–0	0–1	—	2–1	0–1	3–4	0–1	2–2	2–1	1–1	1–1	0–0	2–0	1–2	4–3	0–1	0–3	1–0	2–0
Écija	2–1	2–1	0–1	3–3	—	2–1	1–1	3–1	0–2	0–3	1–1	2–0	1–0	2–1	0–0	1–2	0–0	1–1	1–1	2–1
El Ejido	1–1	2–2	3–3	2–0	1–0	—	1–3	0–2	5–0	4–3	2–2	5–1	1–1	1–0	1–0	0–2	0–1	1–1	3–0	4–1
Extremadura	5–2	5–0	1–1	2–1	4–0	2–2	—	1–0	1–0	1–1	0–2	0–2	3–0	1–0	3–0	0–1	1–0	1–0	3–2	0–1
Granada B	0–0	0–0	0–1	1–0	3–1	0–0	1–0	—	1–1	1–0	1–1	1–1	1–0	0–2	1–0	1–2	0–1	0–0	0–1	3–1
Jumilla	1–0	2–2	0–1	1–0	0–0	0–0	1–1	1–1	—	1–0	1–0	2–0	1–1	0–2	1–1	0–0	1–0	0–0	1–2	0–0
Las Palmas Atlético	2–0	0–0	1–1	0–1	3–1	1–1	1–0	2–1	1–2	—	2–3	4–1	0–0	1–1	2–0	0–1	2–1	0–1	2–0	2–1
Linense	2–0	4–1	0–0	0–1	0–1	2–0	2–0	3–3	1–1	1–3	—	2–0	0–1	2–2	2–0	1–2	2–0	0–0	0–0	0–0
Lorca Deportiva	1–4	3–1	1–2	0–6	0–1	0–2	1–1	0–1	1–2	3–2	0–2	—	0–0	0–0	4–0	0–2	1–1	2–4	1–0	0–0
Marbella	0–1	1–0	1–0	4–1	3–0	2–0	1–1	3–0	2–0	2–1	1–0	2–1	—	1–0	2–0	1–1	2–0	1–0	1–2	1–0
Melilla	0–0	4–0	2–0	3–0	1–1	2–0	0–0	1–0	1–0	0–1	1–0	1–2	1–2	—	0–1	0–0	1–0	2–0	1–0	3–0
Mérida	3–0	3–1	2–1	0–0	2–0	2–2	0–2	0–2	1–0	4–0	2–0	0–2	2–2	2–1	—	0–0	0–0	2–1	1–1	0–1
Murcia	1–0	0–1	2–1	0–2	0–1	4–1	3–2	2–0	1–0	2–0	0–2	0–0	3–0	0–1	1–1	—	0–0	2–1	1–2	2–0
Recreativo	2–0	1–0	2–3	2–0	3–1	1–1	2–1	0–0	1–2	1–1	1–1	1–2	1–0	0–2	2–0	1–1	—	2–1	0–1	0–0
San Fernando	2–1	2–0	0–2	1–1	2–1	4–2	1–1	2–2	3–0	0–0	2–0	3–1	1–3	0–2	1–0	3–2	0–1	—	1–1	0–3 (Note: Game awarded to Villanovense due to illegal alignment of San Fernando. Originally, match ended 0–0.)
UCAM Murcia	1–1	2–1	0–2	2–1	2–2	1–1	0–2	2–0	0–1	2–1	1–1	1–0	2–1	1–1	1–1	1–1	2–1	2–1	—	0–0
Villanovense	1–0	1–0	1–0	0–1	3–0	1–3	1–0	0–2	2–0	0–0	1–1	1–0	0–4	1–0	0–0	1–1	1–0	0–0	2–0	—

Source: BDFútbol
Legend: Blue = home team win; Yellow = draw; Red = away team win.

=== Top goalscorers ===
As of 13 May 2018

Goalscorers	Goals	Team
(Spain) Loren Morón	17	Betis Deportivo
(Ghana) Richard Boateng	14	Melilla
(Spain) Isaac Aketxe	13	Cartagena
(Spain) Marc Fernández	12	UCAM Murcia
(Spain) Ezequiel Lamarca	12	Écija

=== Top goalkeepers ===
As of 13 May 2018

Goalkeeper	Goals	Matches	Average	Team
(Spain) Dani Barrio	17	29	0.59	Melilla
(Spain) Wilfred Muñoz	27	38	0.71	Marbella
(Spain) Leandro Montagud	28	34	0.82	Villanovense
(Spain) Biel Ribas	31	37	0.84	Murcia
(Spain) Aarón Escandell	26	31	0.84	Granada B

== Average attendances ==
This is a list of attendance data of the teams that give an official number. They include playoffs games:

Pos	Team	Total	High	Low	Average	Change
1	Elche	179,956	20,164	4,932	8,180	+9.2%^{1}
2	Murcia	162,400	22,457	4,514	8,120	+8.8%
3	Cartagena	162,906	14,000	4,600	7,405	+7.0%
4	Racing Santander	129,955	11,924	5,020	7,110	−16.6%
5	Extremadura	152,651	11,580	3,588	6,939	n/a
6	Mallorca	136,891	13,780	3,181	6,519	−28.7%^{1}
7	UD Logroñés	59,294	5,536	2,280	3,121	+35.0%
8	Mirandés	64,957	5,133	2,219	3,093	−1.1%^{1}
9	Ponferradina	56,268	3,480	2,153	2,961	−41.1%
10	UCAM Murcia	47,309	5,751	1,587	2,490	−36.3%^{1}
11	Sabadell	35,557	3,856	1,246	1,871	−28.3%
12	Gimnástica Segoviana	28,883	2,527	1,100	1,605	+37.3%^{2}
13	San Fernando	21,212	2,102	1,000	1,178	n/a
14	El Ejido	19,842	1,897	749	1,102	n/a
15	Olot	20,283	1,890	510	1,068	−15.8%^{2}
16	Real Madrid Castilla	15,859	1,412	475	835	−13.3%

Notes:
1: Team played last season in Segunda División.
2: Team played last season in Tercera División.
