= Benja (footballer) =

Spanish footballer (born 1987)

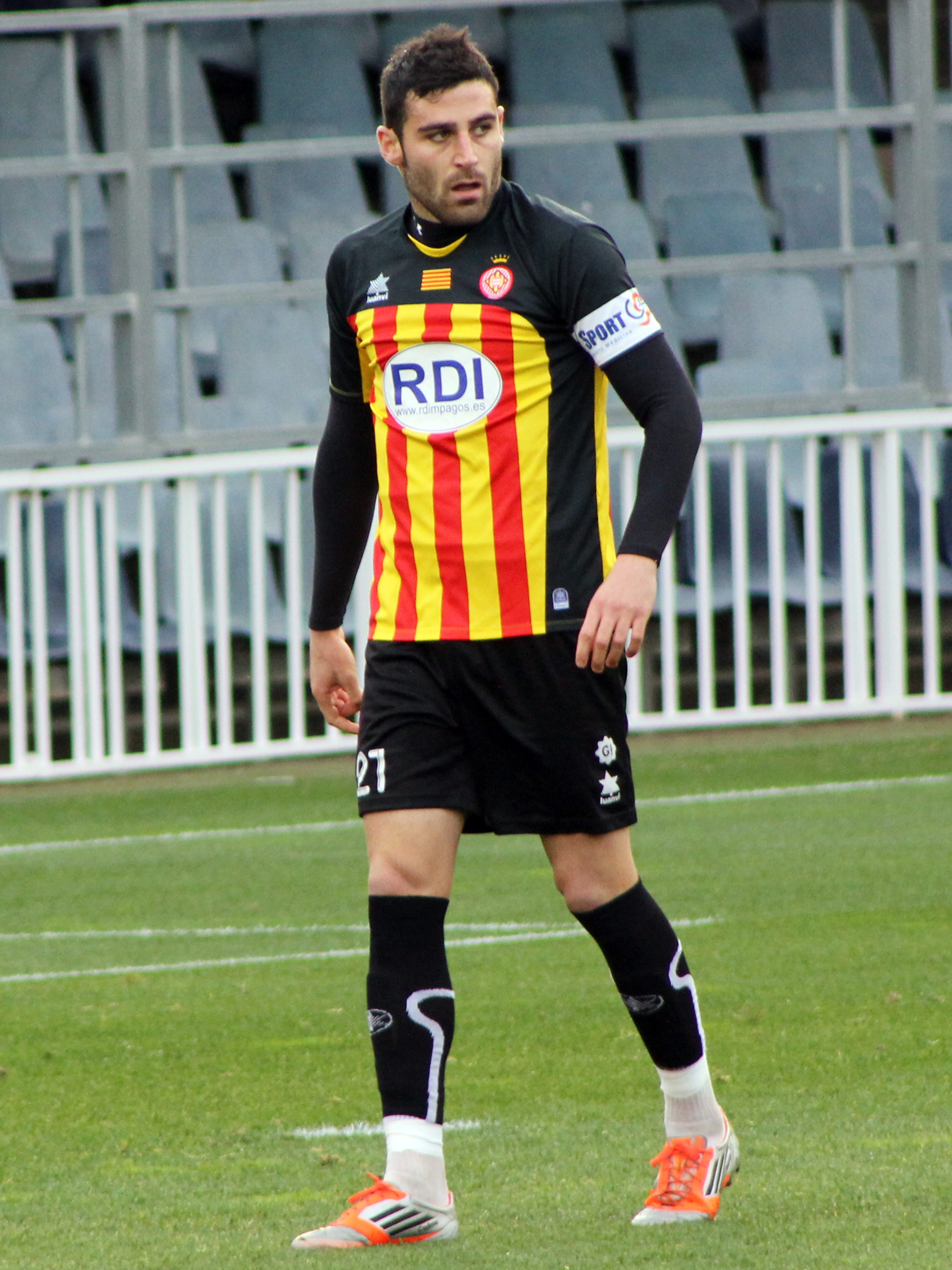
- Benja with Girona in 2012

Personal information
- Full name: Benjamín Martínez Martínez
- Date of birth: 23 August 1987 (age 39)
- Place of birth: Sant Cugat del Vallès, Spain
- Height: 1.87 m (6 ft 1 1/2 in)
- Position: Forward

Youth career
- Sant Cugat
- Mercantil
- 2005–2006: Damm

Senior career*
Years	Team	Apps	(Gls)
2006–2008	Espanyol B	0	(0)
2006–2008	→ Europa (loan)	64	(16)
2008–2011	Barcelona B	62	(17)
2008	→ Reus (loan)	18	(8)
2011–2013	Girona	51	(14)
2013	Córdoba	0	(0)
2014–2015	Las Palmas	5	(1)
2015	→ Sabadell (loan)	14	(1)
2015–2016	Llagostera	31	(3)
2016–2017	Cultural Leonesa	39	(25)
2017–2019	Elche	61	(14)
2019	→ Hércules (loan)	19	(4)
2019–2021	Hércules	39	(8)
2021–2023	Intercity	29	(7)
Total		432	(118)
- * Club domestic league appearances and goals

Benjamín Martínez Martínez (born 23 August 1987), known as Benja, is a Spanish former professional footballer who played as a forward.

He played 142 Segunda División games and scored 24 goals for Barcelona B, Girona, Las Palmas, Sabadell, Llagostera and Elche, adding 159 matches and 56 goals in the Segunda División B for four clubs.

== Club career ==
Born in Sant Cugat del Vallès, Province of Barcelona, Catalonia, Benja concluded his youth development at Damm before joining Espanyol B in 2006, spending his tenure on loan at Europa. Two years later, he joined another reserve team, Barcelona B; after a loan at Reus, he scored eight goals in 26 games in his first season as they won promotion from Segunda División B, including a hat-trick in a 3–3 away draw against Polideportivo Ejido in the first leg of the play-off first round.

Benja transferred to Segunda División side Girona on 14 July 2011, totalling 14 goals in 53 competitive matches over the next two campaigns, two of those coming in the first 11 minutes of a 3–1 home win over Sporting de Gijón on 29 September 2012. The following 24 February, he suffered a serious left knee injury against Córdoba, but he nonetheless agreed to sign for this club on 27 June; the deal was frozen until his recovery.

After terminating his contract in January 2014, Benja joined another second-division team, Las Palmas, on the anniversary of his injury. One year later, he returned to his native region once more when he was loaned to Sabadell for the rest of the campaign, which ended in relegation.

On 27 July 2016, having met the same fate with Llagostera, Benja dropped into division three for the first time in six years, moving to Cultural Leonesa. Roughly one year later, after scoring a career-best 25 goals – 26 overall – to help them to return to the second tier after 42 years, the 30-year-old joined Elche.

In his first season at the Estadio Martínez Valero, Benja scored 14 times in all competitions, including the crucial goal in a 3–2 aggregate victory over Villarreal B in the playoff final to reach the second division on 23 June 2018. Having not added another goal, he joined neighbouring Hércules in February 2019 on a short-term loan to cover the long-term injury of Stephane Emaná; in July, following a playoff final defeat to Ponferradina, he signed a two-year deal.

Benja joined Segunda Federación's Intercity in summer 2021.

== Honours ==
Cultural Leonesa

- Segunda División B: 2016–17
