= Fran Grima =

Spanish footballer

Personal information
- Full name: Francisco Grima Aguilera
- Date of birth: 5 February 1987 (age 39)
- Place of birth: Olesa de Montserrat, Spain
- Height: 1.73 m (5 ft 8 in)
- Position: Right back

Team information
- Current team: Vilanova

Youth career
- Terrassa

Senior career*
Years	Team	Apps	(Gls)
2006–2007	Terrassa B		
2007–2008	Sant Andreu		
2008–2009	Atlético Baleares	27	(0)
2009–2010	Sant Andreu	18	(0)
2010–2011	Espanyol B	33	(0)
2011–2012	Sant Andreu	37	(0)
2012–2013	Terrassa	30	(1)
2013–2017	Badalona	133	(2)
2017–2018	Mallorca	3	(0)
2018	→ UCAM Murcia (loan)	9	(0)
2018–2023	Ibiza	104	(0)
2023–2024	Badajoz	31	(1)
2024–2025	Badalona Futur	31	(0)
2025–	Vilanova	9	(0)
- * Club domestic league appearances and goals as of 8 November 2025

Francisco "Fran" Grima Aguilera (born 5 February 1987) is a Spanish professional footballer who plays as a right back for Tercera Federación club Vilanova.

== Club career ==
Grima was born in Olesa de Montserrat, Barcelona, Catalonia, and made his senior debut with Terrassa FC's reserves in 2006, in the regional leagues. In 2007, he moved to Tercera División side UE Sant Andreu, and achieved promotion to Segunda División B at the end of the season.

In July 2008, Grima signed for CD Atlético Baleares in the third division, but returned to Sant Andreu roughly one year later. On 30 June 2010, he joined RCD Espanyol and was assigned to the reserves in the fourth level.

On 2 August 2011, Grima returned to Sant Andreu for a third spell. He then rejoined his first team Terrassa, now assigned to the main squad in the fourth division, before signing for CF Badalona in division three on 29 July 2013.

After being an undisputed starter for the Escapulats, Grima agreed to a contract with RCD Mallorca, recently relegated to the third tier, on 27 June 2017. The following 30 January, after featuring rarely, he moved to fellow league team UCAM Murcia CF on loan until June.

Grima left Mallorca on 3 July 2018, after the club's promotion, and signed for UD Ibiza on 18 July. He was a first-choice for the latter during the following years, helping in their first-ever promotion to Segunda División in 2021.

Grima made his professional debut at the age of 34 on 13 August 2021, starting in a 0–0 away draw against Real Zaragoza.
