= Alfonso Artabe =

Spanish professional footballer

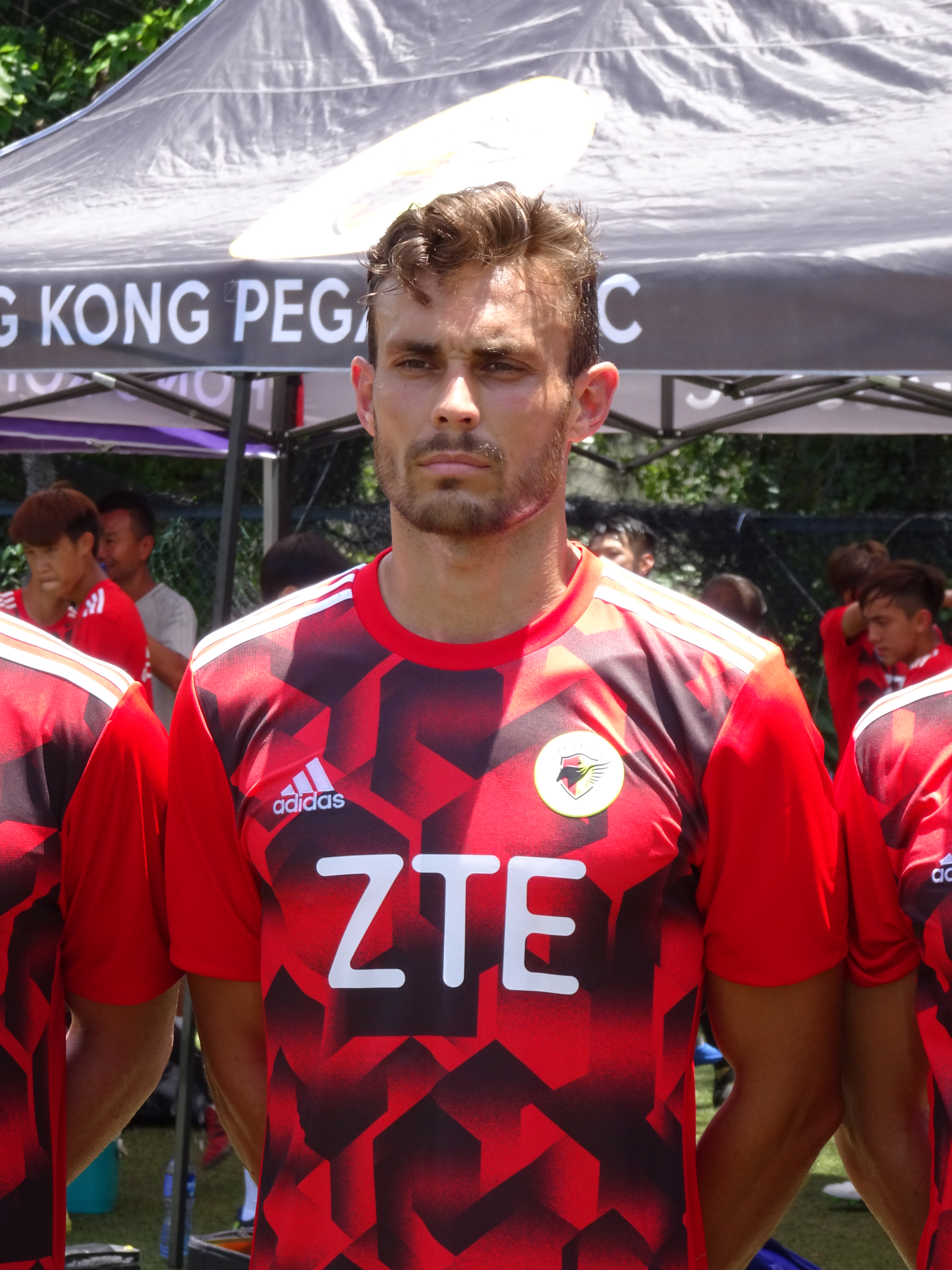
- Artabe being presented by Pegasus

Personal information
- Full name: Alfonso Artabe Meca
- Date of birth: 18 August 1988 (age 38)
- Place of birth: Palma, Spain
- Height: 1.83 m (6 ft 0 in)
- Position: Centre-back

Team information
- Current team: Llosetense

Youth career
- 2005–2007: Mallorca

Senior career*
Years	Team	Apps	(Gls)
2007–2008	Ferriolense	29	(1)
2008–2009	Universidad Oviedo	25	(1)
2009–2011	Oviedo B	61	(14)
2010–2011	Oviedo	7	(0)
2011–2012	Manacor	31	(4)
2012–2013	Llagostera	27	(3)
2013–2014	Prat	28	(0)
2014–2015	Atlético Baleares	27	(2)
2015–2016	Sint-Truiden	8	(0)
2016–2017	Ermis	33	(2)
2017	Pegasus		
2018	Ermis	14	(5)
2018	Voluntari	4	(0)
2019–2020	Doxa	8	(1)
2020–2021	Covadonga	21	(1)
2021–2022	Zemplín	22	(1)
2022–2023	Manacor	23	(2)
2023–	Llosetense	36	(6)
- * Club domestic league appearances and goals as of 13 October 2024

Alfonso Artabe Meca (born 18 August 1988) is a Spanish professional footballer who plays as a central defender for Llosetense.

== Club career ==
Born in Palma de Mallorca, Balearic Islands, Artabe only played in the lower leagues in his country. In the Segunda División B, he represented Real Oviedo, CE Manacor, UE Llagostera, AE Prat, CD Atlético Baleares and CD Covadonga.

Artabe had professional spells in the Belgian First Division A (Sint-Truidense VV), the Cypriot First Division (Ermis Aradippou FC and Doxa Katokopias FC), the Romanian Liga I (FC Voluntari) and the Slovak Super Liga (MFK Zemplín Michalovce).

== Personal life ==
Artabe's grandfather, Javier (1934–2020), was an important player for Oviedo in the 50s/60's, appearing with the club in La Liga as a forward.

== Career statistics ==
As of match played 21 February 2021

Appearances and goals by club, season and competition
Club	Season	League			National Cup		Total	
Club	Season	Division	Apps	Goals	Apps	Goals	Apps	Goals
Oviedo	2009–10	Segunda División B	6	0	0	0	6	0
Oviedo	2010–11	Segunda División B	1	0	0	0	1	0
Oviedo	Total		7	0	0	0	7	0
Manacor	2011–12	Segunda División B	31	4	0	0	31	4
Llagostera	2012–13	Segunda División B	27	3	4	0	31	3
Prat	2013–14	Segunda División B	28	0	0	0	28	0
Atlético Baleares	2014–15	Segunda División B	27	2	0	0	27	2
Sint-Truiden	2015–16	Belgian Pro League	8	0	1	0	9	0
Ermis	2016–17	Cypriot First Division	33	2	0	0	33	2
Ermis	2017–18	Cypriot First Division	14	5	1	0	15	5
Ermis	Total		47	7	1	0	48	7
Pegasus	2017	Hong Kong Premier League	?	?	?	?	?	?
Voluntari	2018–19	Liga I	4	0	0	0	4	0
Doxa	2018–19	Cypriot First Division	6	1	0	0	6	1
Doxa	2019–20	Cypriot First Division	2	0	0	0	2	0
Doxa	Total		8	1	0	0	8	1
Covadonga	2020–21	Segunda División B	12	0	0	0	12	0
Career total			?	0	?	0	?	0
