= Chema Mato =

Spanish footballer

Personal information
- Full name: José María Mato Nieto
- Date of birth: 22 March 1984 (age 42)
- Place of birth: Santander, Spain
- Height: 1.78 m (5 ft 10 in)
- Position: Midfielder

Youth career
- Rayo Cantabria

Senior career*
Years	Team	Apps	(Gls)
2003–2004	Rayo Cantabria		
2004–2007	Racing B	90	(5)
2007–2008	Racing Ferrol	26	(1)
2008–2011	Cultural Leonesa	90	(3)
2011–2012	Rayo Cantabria	29	(3)
2012–2013	Villanovense	34	(5)
2013–2014	Linense	35	(6)
2014–2015	Guadalajara	34	(1)
2015–2017	Tudelano	67	(4)
2017–2018	Mérida	24	(1)
2018	San Fernando	0	(0)
2018–2019	Portugalete	12	(0)
2019	Laredo	12	(0)
2019–2020	Bezana	20	(5)
- * Club domestic league appearances and goals

José Maria 'Chema' Mato Nieto (born 22 March 1984) is a Spanish former footballer who played as a midfielder.

== Club career ==
Born in Santander, Cantabria, Mato made his senior debuts with Deportivo Rayo Cantabria in the 2003–04 season, in Tercera División. A season later, he joined Racing de Santander, being assigned to the reserves also in the fourth level. He also appeared two times with the first team (against Real Madrid on 21 December 2005 and against Real Betis on 17 June 2007), only limited to the bench, however.

On 17 August 2007 Mato signed with Racing de Ferrol, in Segunda División. He made his division debut on 2 September, starting in a 3–1 away win over Polideportivo Ejido. Mato scored his first professional goal on 5 April 2008, the first of a 2–1 home win over Celta de Vigo.

Mato played in Segunda División B but also in the fourth level in the following seasons, representing Cultural y Deportiva Leonesa, Rayo Cantabria, CF Villanovense, Real Balompédica Linense, CD Guadalajara and CD Tudelano.
