= Marc Vallhonesta =

Catalan footballer

Vallho
Personal information
- Full name: Marc Vallhonesta Carreras
- Date of birth: 3 December 1986 (age 39)
- Place of birth: Sils, Catalonia
- Height: 1.88 m (6 ft 2 in)
- Position: Centre back

Youth career
- 1990–1998: Sils
- 1998–2000: Buenos Aires
- 2000–2002: Vilobí
- 2002–2005: Girona

Senior career*
Years	Team	Apps	(Gls)
2005	Girona	1	(0)
2005–2006	FE Figueres		
2006–2008	Banyoles		
2008–2009	Cassà	30	(0)
2009–2015	Llagostera	140	(1)
2015–2016	Olot	20	(2)
2016–2018	Peralada	52	(2)
2018–2019	CE Besalú	20	(2)
- * Club domestic league appearances and goals

Marc Vallhonesta Carreras (born 3 December 1986), commonly known as Vallho, is a Spanish former professional footballer who played as a central defender.

== Club career ==
Born in Sils, Girona, Catalonia, Vallho graduated from local Girona FC's youth system, and made his senior debut on 24 April 2005, starting in a 0–1 home loss against CA Osasuna B in the Segunda División B. He later appeared for lower league clubs in his native region.

In the 2009 summer, Vallho moved to UE Llagostera, freshly promoted to the Tercera División. In 2011, after the club's promotion to the Segunda B, he renewed his link and remained as a starter during the following campaigns.

Vallho appeared in 41 matches during the 2013–14 season, as the Unió were promoted to the Segunda División for the first time ever. He made his debut as a professional on 23 August 2014, aged 27, starting in a 0–2 away loss against UD Las Palmas.

On 9 July 2015, Vallho rescinded his contract with the Blanquivermells.
