= Carlos de Lerma =

Spanish footballer

Personal information
- Full name: Carlos Tornero López de Lerma
- Date of birth: 7 October 1984 (age 42)
- Place of birth: San Vicente, Spain
- Height: 1.74 m (5 ft 9 in)
- Position: Defensive midfielder

Youth career
- 1992–1995: ADCR Leman's
- 1995–2001: Leganés

Senior career*
Years	Team	Apps	(Gls)
2001–2005	Leganés B		
2005	Leganés	10	(0)
2005–2008	Levante B	81	(4)
2008–2010	Ceuta	60	(5)
2010–2011	Albacete	26	(0)
2011–2012	Leganés	36	(1)
2012–2013	Gimnàstic	24	(1)
2013–2014	Cartagena	36	(3)
2014–2018	Toledo	126	(3)
2018–2019	Alcoyano	31	(0)
2019–2020	Móstoles	13	(0)
2020	Hércules	6	(0)
2020–2021	Ebro	12	(0)
2021–2023	Marbella	40	(0)
Total		501	(17)

Managerial career
- 2024–2025: Marbella (assistant)
- 2025: Marbella
- * Club domestic league appearances and goals

Carlos Tornero López de Lerma (born 7 October 1984) is a Spanish former professional footballer who played as a defensive midfielder.

== Playing career ==
Born in San Vicente de Alcántara, Province of Badajoz, Extremadura, de Lerma began his career with CD Leganés, joining its youth system in 1995 at the age of 10. In 2005, he made his debut with the main squad in the Segunda División B, then continued his career at that level with Atlético Levante UD – being summoned by the first team for training but failing to appear in any official matches during his three-year stint – and AD Ceuta.

De Lerma became captain in his second season at Ceuta, but left in June 2010 after terminating his contract, signing with Albacete Balompié of Segunda División. He made his debut in the competition on 29 August, as a late substitute in a 1–1 home draw against AD Alcorcón.

On 20 July 2011, having appeared regularly with the Castilla–La Mancha side (14 starts, 1,479 minutes) but suffering relegation, de Lerma returned to his first club Leganés. He was first choice in his only campaign, but they could only finish in 12th position.

On 26 June 2012, de Lerma signed a contract with Gimnàstic de Tarragona, recently relegated to the third tier. He made his competitive debut on 26 August, scoring the opening goal in a 1–1 home draw with Valencia CF Mestalla.

De Lerma was released by Nàstic on 6 June 2013, joining FC Cartagena of the same league the following month. He remained in the division subsequently, mainly with CD Toledo where he acted as captain.

== Coaching career ==
On 25 March 2025, having started as part of the backroom staff at Marbella FC, de Lerma became the Primera Federación club's third manager of the season after Fran Beltrán and Abel Segovia, signing a contract until 30 June. On 13 June, after managing to avoid relegation, he agreed to a new one-year deal, but was dismissed on 11 November.

== Managerial statistics ==
As of 9 November 2025

Managerial record by team and tenure
Team	Nat	From	To	Record								Ref
Team	Nat	From	To	G	W	D	L	GF	GA	GD	Win %	Ref
Marbella	(Spain)	25 March 2025	11 November 2025	20	7	6	7	23	23	+0	35.00	
Total				20	7	6	7	23	23	+0	35.00	—
