= Pablo Hernández (footballer, born 2000) =

Spanish footballer

Personal information
- Full name: Pablo Hernández Luis
- Date of birth: 18 December 2000 (age 25)
- Place of birth: Santa Cruz de Tenerife, Spain
- Height: 1.76 m (5 ft 9 in)
- Position: Midfielder

Team information
- Current team: UCAM Murcia
- Number: 14

Youth career
- EMF Candelaria
- Juventud Laguna
- Tenerife

Senior career*
Years	Team	Apps	(Gls)
2021–2023	Tenerife B	56	(0)
2023–2024	Tenerife	2	(0)
2024	→ Melilla (loan)	16	(1)
2024–2025	Badalona Futur	18	(0)
2025–	UCAM Murcia	42	(0)
- * Club domestic league appearances and goals as of 15 May 2026

Pablo Hernández Luis (born 18 December 2000) is a Spanish footballer who plays as a midfielder for Segunda Federación club UCAM Murcia.

== Career ==
Born in Santa María del Mar, Santa Cruz de Tenerife, Canary Islands, Hernández joined CD Tenerife's youth setup from CF Juventud Laguna. Promoted to the reserves in Tercera División RFEF ahead of the 2021–22 season, he made his senior debut on 5 September 2021, starting in a 3–0 away loss to CD Herbania.

In July 2023, already established as a regular starter for the B-team, Hernández was called up to the first team for the pre-season. On 17 August, he was definitely promoted to the main squad, being assigned the number 20 jersey.

Hernández made his professional debut on 30 September 2023, coming on as a late substitute for Yann Bodiger in a 3–0 Segunda División away loss to SD Eibar. The following 9 January, after featuring rarely, he was loaned to Primera Federación side UD Melilla for the remainder of the campaign.

On 16 August 2024, Hernández terminated his link with Tete.
