= Albert Canal (footballer) =

Spanish footballer

Personal information
- Full name: Albert Canal Bartrina
- Date of birth: 10 July 1991 (age 35)
- Place of birth: Olot, Spain
- Height: 1.81 m (5 ft 11 in)
- Position: Centre back

Youth career
- 2008–2010: Girona

Senior career*
Years	Team	Apps	(Gls)
2010–2011	Llagostera	16	(1)
2011–2013	Espanyol B	23	(0)
2011	Espanyol	0	(0)
2012–2013	→ Llagostera (loan)	20	(0)
2013–2015	Olot	37	(1)
2015–2017	Manlleu	67	(4)
2017–2019	Figueres	48	(7)
2019–2020	Peralada	21	(0)
2020–2023	Resources Capital	24	(1)
- * Club domestic league appearances and goals as of 7 May 2023

Albert Canal Bartrina (born 10 July 1991) is a former Spanish professional footballer who played as a centre back.

== Club career ==
Born in Olot, Girona, Catalonia, Canal began his senior career with UE Llagostera in the Tercera División, helping them to promote to Segunda División B for the first time ever in his only season. In December 2010 he signed with neighbours RCD Espanyol, being assigned to the reserves in the third tier.

Canal made his first-team debut on 13 December 2011, coming on as an 82nd-minute substitute for fellow youth graduate Víctor Álvarez in a Copa del Rey match against RC Celta de Vigo (0–0 away draw, 4–2 aggregate). He continued appearing exclusively for the B team until his release in June 2013, also serving a short loan at his first club, now in division three.

Canal continued competing in the lower leagues and amateur football the following years, with UE Olot, AEC Manlleu, UE Figueres and CF Peralada; all the sides hailed from his native region. In October 2020, the 29-year-old moved abroad and joined Resources Capital FC in the Hong Kong Premier League.

In May 2023, Canal announced his retirement from professional football.
