= Pere Tarradellas =

Spanish footballer

Personal information
- Full name: Pedro Tarradellas Cámara
- Date of birth: 25 November 1979 (age 46)
- Place of birth: Mollet del Vallès, Spain
- Height: 1.79 m (5 ft 10 1/2 in)
- Position: Winger

Youth career
- Tona
- Vic
- Granollers

Senior career*
Years	Team	Apps	(Gls)
1998–1999	Manlleu		
1999–2000	Figueres	31	(0)
2000–2001	Espanyol B	7	(1)
2001–2003	Mataró	59	(10)
2003–2004	Lleida	34	(3)
2004–2005	Ponferradina	36	(4)
2005–2008	Badalona	71	(4)
2008–2009	Gavà	37	(4)
2009–2011	Sant Andreu	76	(10)
2011–2015	Llagostera	116	(9)
Total		467	(44)
- * Club domestic league appearances and goals

Pedro 'Pere' Tarradellas Cámara (born 25 November 1979) is a Spanish retired footballer who played as a left winger.

== Football career ==
Born in Mollet del Vallès, Barcelona, Catalonia, Tarradellas started playing as a senior with local Granollers. He later represented teams in his native region, playing for Manlleu, Figueres, Espanyol B, Mataró and Lleida.

On 31 August 2004, Tarradellas signed for Ponferradina, appearing regularly for the Castile and León team in his only season, which finished in promotion. He moved to Badalona in the 2005 summer, and was an ever-present figure over the course of three campaigns.

In July 2009, Tarradellas joined Sant Andreu, after a short spell at neighbouring Gavà. Again a regular, he scored a career-best nine goals in the 2009–10 season.

In August 2011, Tarradellas moved to fellow league team Llagostera, achieving promotion to Segunda División (the club's first ever) at the end of the 2013–14 campaign. On 23 August 2014, aged 34, he made his debut as a professional, starting in a 0–2 away loss against Las Palmas.

On 8 June 2015, after appearing in 14 matches during the campaign, Tarradellas announced his retirement.
