= Jordi Masó (footballer) =

Spanish footballer

Personal information
- Full name: Jordi Masó Ribas
- Date of birth: 19 September 1992 (age 34)
- Place of birth: Fontcoberta, Spain
- Height: 1.77 m (5 ft 10 in)
- Position: Midfielder

Youth career
- 2000–2006: Banyoles
- 2006–2010: Girona
- 2010–2011: Barcelona

Senior career*
Years	Team	Apps	(Gls)
2010	Girona	1	(0)
2011	Barcelona B	1	(0)
2011–2017	Llagostera	183	(1)
2017–2021	Olot	110	(5)
Total		295	(6)
- * Club domestic league appearances and goals

Jordi Masó Ribas (born 19 September 1992) is a Spanish former footballer. Mainly a central midfielder, he could also play as a right-back.

== Club career ==
Born in Fontcoberta, Girona, Catalonia, Masó spent four of his formative years with Girona FC. On 16 April 2010, while still a junior, he made his professional debut, coming on as a late substitute in a 4–0 away loss against Levante UD in the Segunda División; he was almost exclusively associated to the youth squad during his spell, however.

In summer 2010, Masó joined FC Barcelona, being initially assigned to the juniors. However, he did appear once for the reserve side, playing the last 19 minutes of the 3–2 second-tier away win over Rayo Vallecano on 4 June 2011. He was released in August, moving to Segunda División B club UE Llagostera shortly after.

Masó quickly established himself as a regular starter for his new team, being converted to a right-back in the process. On 11 March 2015, he signed a contract extension until 2017.
