= Ñoño =

Spanish footballer (born 1983)

Personal information
- Full name: José Antonio Vélez Jiménez
- Date of birth: 16 September 1983 (age 43)
- Place of birth: Tarragona, Spain
- Height: 1.80 m (5 ft 11 in)
- Position: Left-back

Youth career
- Gimnàstic

Senior career*
Years	Team	Apps	(Gls)
2004–2005	Gimnàstic	2	(0)
2005	→ Alcoyano (loan)	8	(1)
2005–2006	Sant Andreu	11	(0)
2006–2007	Andorra	15	(5)
2007–2008	Marino	27	(1)
2008–2012	Pobla Mafumet	114	(12)
2012–2013	Gimnàstic	10	(1)
2013–2015	Reus	42	(0)
2015–2017	Cornellà	60	(4)
2017–2018	Hospitalet	15	(2)
2018–2019	Borges	15	(1)
2019–2022	Ascó	39	(3)
2022	Tortosa	9	(0)
2022–2023	Pobla Mafumet B	21	(1)
2024	Gandesa	6	(0)
Total		394	(31)
- * Club domestic league appearances and goals

José Antonio Vélez Jiménez (born 16 September 1983), known as Ñoño, is a Spanish former footballer. Mainly a left-back, he could also play as a left winger.

== Club career ==
Born in Tarragona, Catalonia, Ñoño began his career with local Gimnàstic de Tarragona, and made his senior debut on 27 November 2004 by coming on as a second-half substitute in a 2–1 away win over Terrassa FC in the Segunda División. He finished the season on loan to CD Alcoyano of Segunda División B.

Ñoño stayed in the third level for the 2005–06 campaign, appearing rarely for UE Sant Andreu and moving all the way down to the regional leagues with FC Andorra. In summer 2007 he returned to the third tier, signing for Marino de Luanco.

Subsequently, Ñoño spent four seasons with CF Pobla de Mafumet, Gimnàstic's farm team. On 10 July 2012 he was promoted to the main squad, making his official debut on 2 September against RCD Espanyol B and scoring his first goal later that month in the 3–2 loss at CE L'Hospitalet.

On 7 June 2013, Ñoño opted to not renew his contract with Gimnàstic, and was released. Two weeks later, he joined neighbouring CF Reus Deportiu also of division three.

== Personal life ==
Ñoño's younger brother, Francisco, was also a footballer. Both played for Gimnàstic and Pobla.
