= Mérida AD =

Spanish association football club

Mérida
- Full name: Asociación Deportiva Mérida, S.A.D.
- Nicknames: Romanos; Pecholatas
- Founded: 19 February 2013; 13 years ago as Mérida Asociación Deportiva
- Stadium: Estadio Romano
- Capacity: 14,600
- Owner: Best Intentions Analytics Limited
- President: Cliff Crown
- Head coach: Fran Beltrán
- League: Primera Federación – Group 1
- 2025–26: Primera Federación – Group 1, 10th of 20
- Website: admerida.es
Home colours	Away colours	Third colours

Asociación Deportiva Mérida, S.A.D. is a Spanish football club based in Mérida, in the autonomous community of Extremadura. Founded in 2013 it is a successor club of CP Mérida, it currently plays in Primera Federación – Group 1.

== History ==
The club was founded on 19 February 2013 and six days later, it was registered in General Registry of Sports Entities of Extremadura. Mérida UD was dissolved later in 2013 and Mérida AD bought their place in Tercera División.

On 30 May 2015, the club was promoted to Segunda División B after defeating CD Laredo 2–1 on aggregate in the playoffs. On 27 August that year, the team competed in the Copa del Rey for the first time, losing 0–3 at home to Peña Sport FC in the opening round.

In 2017–18, the club were given a bye to the second round of the cup, where they lost 2–0 at CF Fuenlabrada. The season ended with relegation back to the fourth tier after a 2–2 aggregate defeat (away goals) to Coruxo FC in the relegation play-offs, but the club bounced back a year later with a penalty shootout win against UD Socuéllamos.

After a league restructuring in 2021, Mérida was placed in the new fourth-tier Segunda División RFEF. That season, they came runners-up in their group to Córdoba CF and achieved promotion via the play-offs with a 2–0 extra-time win over CD Teruel.

In 2025, Best Intentions Analytics Limited (BIA) led by Brentford owner Matthew Benham acquired the club from Mark Heffernan.

== Season to season ==
Season	Tier	Division	Place	Copa del Rey
2013–14	4	3ª	2nd	
2014–15	4	3ª	1st	
2015–16	3	2ª B	8th	First round
2016–17	3	2ª B	5th	
2017–18	3	2ª B	16th	Second round
2018–19	4	3ª	1st	
2019–20	3	2ª B	19th	Second round
2020–21	3	2ª B	6th / 4th	
2021–22	4	2ª RFEF	2nd	
2022–23	3	1ª Fed.	8th	Second round
2023–24	3	1ª Fed.	12th	
2024–25	3	1ª Fed.	4th	
2025–26	3	1ª Fed.	10th	First round
2026–27	3	1ª Fed.		

- 5 seasons in Primera Federación
- 5 seasons in Segunda División B
- 1 season in Segunda División RFEF
- 3 seasons in Tercera División

== Current squad ==
As of 4 November 2026

Note: Flags indicate national team as defined under FIFA eligibility rules; some limited exceptions apply. Players may hold more than one non-FIFA nationality.

No.	Pos.	Nation	Player
1	GK	HUN	Adrián Csenterics
2	DF	ESP	Alejandro Jay
3	DF	ESP	Chechu Martínez
4	DF	ESP	Nacho González
5	DF	ESP	Hugo Sanz
6	MF	ESP	Jota
7	MF	ESP	Javi Areso
8	MF	ESP	Martín Solar
9	FW	ISL	Sigurður Bjartur Hallsson
10	MF	ESP	Carlos Doncel
11	FW	FRA	Sofiane El Ftouhi
13	GK	HUN	Bence Juhász (on loan from Újpest)

No.	Pos.	Nation	Player
14	DF	ESP	Hugo Carrillo
15	DF	ESP	Adrián Salguero
16	DF	ESP	Fito
17	MF	ECU	Darwin Guagua (on loan from Brentford)
18	MF	ALB	Benny Dibrani
19	MF	ESP	Dani Sandoval
20	DF	ESP	Barbu
21	MF	ESP	Raúl Beneit
22	MF	ESP	Antonio Aranda
23	MF	POR	Geo Almeida (on loan from Farense)
24	FW	CIV	Lacine Koné
26	GK	ESP	Álex Gil

=== Reserve team ===
Note: Flags indicate national team as defined under FIFA eligibility rules; some limited exceptions apply. Players may hold more than one non-FIFA nationality.

No.	Pos.	Nation	Player
27	DF	ESP	David Carvajal
29	MF	ESP	Eneas Moreno

No.	Pos.	Nation	Player
30	MF	ESP	Santi Amaro

== Stadium ==
Mérida plays its home games at Estadio Romano, with a capacity of 14,600 spectators.

- Google map for Estadio Romano

== Coaching history ==
- (Spain) Ángel Alcazar (2015)
- (Spain) Antonio Gómez (2016)
- (Spain) José Miguel Campos (2016)
- (Spain) Bernardo Plaza (2016)
- (Spain) Eloy Jiménez (2016–17)
- (Tunisia) Mehdi Nafti (2017)
- (Spain) Loren Morón (2017–18)
- (Tunisia) Mehdi Nafti (2018)
- (Spain) Santi Amaro (2019)
- (Spain) Diego Merino (2019–20)
- (Spain) Juanma (2020)
- (Spain) Dani Mori (2020–21)
- (Spain) Miguel Rivera (2021)
- (Spain) Juan García (2021)
- (Spain) Javier Álvarez de los Mozos (2021–22)
- (Spain) Juanma (2022–23)
- (Spain) Sergi Guilló (2024–25)
- (Spain) Fran Beltrán (2025–)
