= Fran Beltrán (football manager) =

Spanish football manager (born 1992)

Personal information
- Full name: Francisco Ruiz Beltrán
- Date of birth: 27 February 1991 (age 35)
- Place of birth: Alicante, Spain

Team information
- Current team: Mérida (manager)

Managerial career
- Years: Team
- 2008–2009: Carolinas (youth)
- 2009–2011: Barrio Obrero (youth)
- 2011–2012: Elche (youth)
- 2012–2017: Kelme (youth)
- 2017–2018: Cultural Leonesa (youth)
- 2018: UCAM Murcia (youth)
- 2018–2019: Al Ahli (assistant)
- 2020: Viitorul Constanța (assistant)
- 2021–2023: Real Madrid (youth)
- 2023–2025: Marbella
- 2025–: Mérida

Francisco Ruiz Beltrán (born 27 February 1991) is a Spanish football manager, currently in charge of Mérida AD.

== Career ==
Born in Alicante Valencian Community, Beltrán began his career as a youth coach at the age of 17 at SCD Carolinas in his hometown. He joined CD Barrio Obrero in the following year, and subsequently led the club to their first-ever promotion to the Primera Preferente Infantil.

In 2011, Beltrán was named manager of Elche CF's youth sides, but left the club in the following year after being appointed in charge of the Juvenil squad of Kelme CF. He joined Cultural y Deportiva Leonesa under the same role in 2017, but left on 2 January 2018 to take over as coach of the Juvenil A side of UCAM Murcia CF.

In December 2018, Beltrán left UCAM to join Rubén de la Barrera's staff at Qatar Stars League side Al Ahli SC, as his assistant. The duo left on 18 November 2019 by mutual consent, and moved to Romanian Liga I side FC Viitorul Constanța the following 7 August, with Beltrán being again an assistant; they also departed the club on 30 November 2020.

In July 2021, Beltrán joined Real Madrid after being named manager of the Juvenil B team. He led them to two consecutive Liga Nacional Juvenil titles during his two-seasons in charge, before departing on 6 July 2023 to take over Segunda Federación side Marbella FC.

Beltrán led Marbella to a promotion to Primera Federación in his first season, but was sacked on 20 January 2025, after three winless matches into the new year. On 28 June, he replaced Sergi Guilló at the helm of fellow league team Mérida AD.

== Managerial statistics ==
As of 24 April 2026

Managerial record by team and tenure
| Team | Nat | From | To | Record | | | | | | | | Ref |
| Team | Nat | From | To | G | W | D | L | GF | GA | GD | Win % | Ref |
|---|---|---|---|---|---|---|---|---|---|---|---|---|
| Marbella | (Spain) | 6 July 2023 | 20 January 2025 | 62 | 27 | 15 | 20 | 77 | 69 | +8 | 43.55 | |
| Mérida | (Spain) | 28 June 2025 | Present | 35 | 13 | 9 | 13 | 45 | 49 | −4 | 37.14 | |
| Total | | | | 97 | 40 | 24 | 33 | 122 | 118 | +4 | 41.24 | — |
