= Dani Erencia =

Spanish footballer

Personal information
- Full name: Daniel Erencia Moreno
- Date of birth: 7 January 1991 (age 35)
- Place of birth: Terrassa, Spain
- Height: 1.94 m (6 ft 4 1/2 in)
- Position: Centre back

Youth career
- Jàbac Terrassa
- Barcelona
- Terrassa

Senior career*
Years	Team	Apps	(Gls)
2009–2012	Terrassa	33	(4)
2012–2013	Girona	2	(0)
2013–2014	Sporting B	7	(1)
2014–2015	Peña Deportiva	22	(2)
2016	Granollers	0	(0)
- * Club domestic league appearances and goals as of 14 June 2015

Daniel 'Dani' Erencia Moreno (born 7 January 1991) is a Spanish professional footballer who plays as a central defender.
