= Isaac Aketxe =

Spanish footballer (born 1989)

Personal information
- Full name: Isaac Aketxe Barrutia
- Date of birth: 30 June 1989 (age 37)
- Place of birth: Bilbao, Spain
- Height: 1.80 m (5 ft 11 in)
- Position: Attacking midfielder

Youth career
- 1998–1999: Arenas Getxo
- 1999–2004: Athletic Bilbao
- 2004–2006: Arenas Getxo

Senior career*
Years	Team	Apps	(Gls)
2006–2009	Arenas Getxo	38	(18)
2009–2011	Bilbao Athletic	19	(0)
2009	Athletic Bilbao	1	(0)
2010–2011	→ Sestao (loan)	38	(16)
2011–2013	Eibar	12	(1)
2012	→ Real Sociedad B (loan)	6	(0)
2013–2014	Sestao	36	(12)
2014–2016	Cultural Leonesa	73	(32)
2016–2018	Albacete	21	(1)
2017–2018	→ Cartagena (loan)	31	(13)
2018–2019	Cartagena	35	(11)
2019–2021	UCAM Murcia	50	(17)
2021–2022	Hércules	27	(7)
2022–2023	La Nucía	7	(1)
2023	Alzira	15	(4)
2023	Badajoz	5	(0)
2024	Minera	15	(2)
Total		429	(135)
- * Club domestic league appearances and goals

Isaac Aketxe Barrutia (Spanish pronunciation: [ˈisak aˈketʃe]; born 30 June 1989) is a Spanish former professional footballer who played as an attacking midfielder.

== Club career ==
Aketxe was born in Bilbao, Biscay. Having emerged through Athletic Bilbao's prolific youth ranks (although he also played youth football with Basque neighbours Arenas Club de Getxo), he made his La Liga debut on 20 September 2009, coming on as a substitute for striker Fernando Llorente in the final ten minutes of a 3–2 home win against Villarreal CF. He spent the vast majority of his first two seasons at the club with the reserve team, in the Segunda División B.

For the 2010–11 campaign, Aketxe was loaned to another side in the region, Sestao River Club of the Tercera División. In the summer of 2011, his contract with Athletic was not renewed and he signed for SD Eibar in division three.

Aketxe continued competing in the third tier until his retirement, with Real Sociedad B, Sestao, Cultural y Deportiva Leonesa, Albacete Balompié, FC Cartagena, UCAM Murcia CF and Hércules CF. In 2014–15, while at the service of Cultural, he scored a career-best 20 goals.

== Personal life ==
Aketxe's younger brother, Ager, was also a footballer and a midfielder. He too was brought up at Athletic Bilbao. Their father, known as Isaac Aqueche due to spelling conventions of the time, played as a midfielder in the lower divisions of Spanish football including a spell with Athletic's reserves.
