= Miguel Bañuz =

Spanish footballer

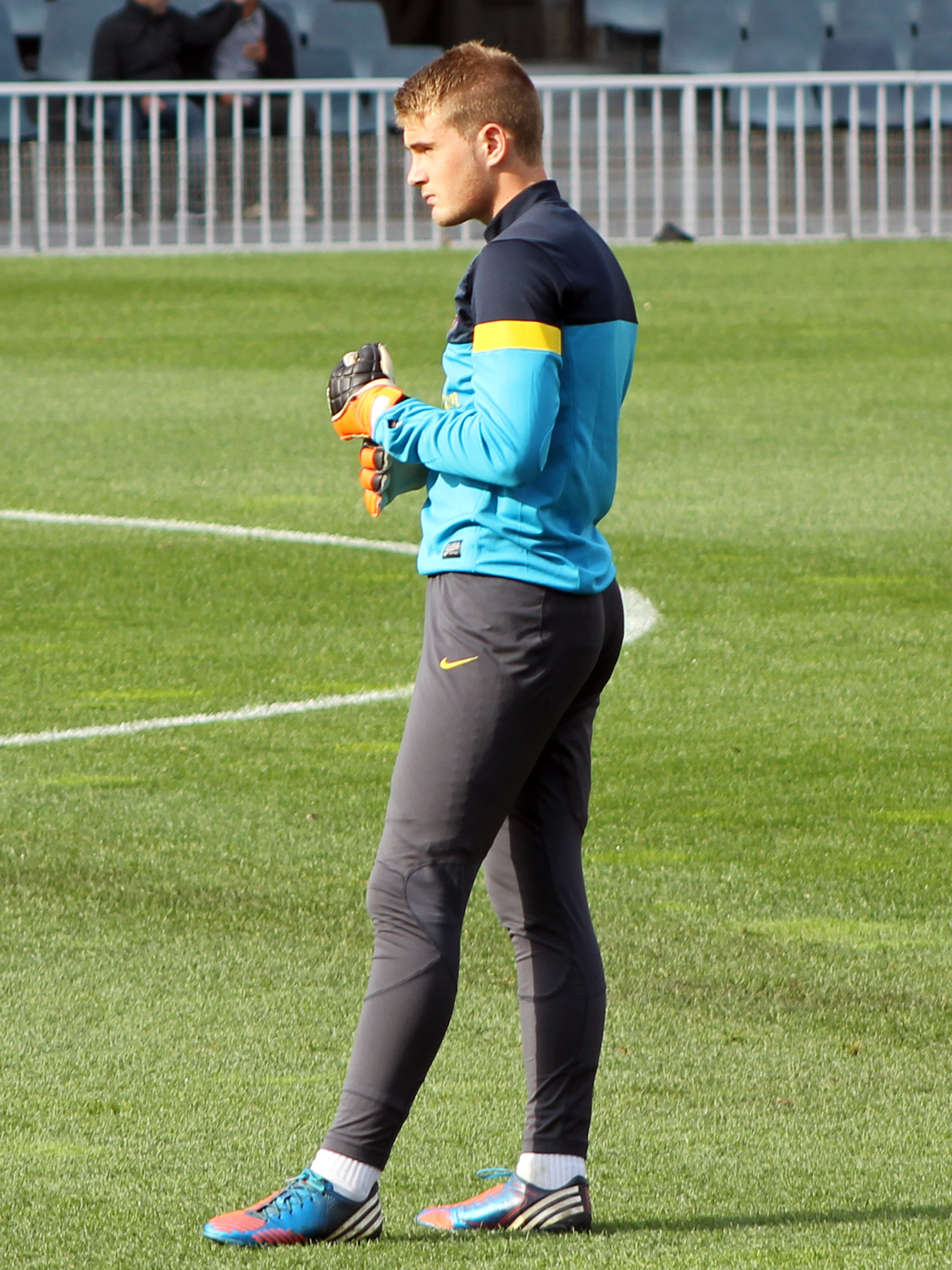
- Bañuz with Barcelona B in 2012

Personal information
- Full name: Miguel Bañuz Antón
- Date of birth: 26 June 1993 (age 33)
- Place of birth: Elche, Spain
- Height: 1.86 m (6 ft 1 in)
- Position: Goalkeeper

Youth career
- 1997–2008: Torrellano
- 2008–2011: Elche
- 2011–2012: Barcelona

Senior career*
Years	Team	Apps	(Gls)
2012–2014	Barcelona B	5	(0)
2014–2016	Villarreal B	19	(0)
2016–2019	Alcoyano	75	(0)
2019–2021	Andorra	9	(0)
2021–2022	Sanse	36	(0)
2022–2023	Alcoyano	36	(0)
2023–2026	Cultural Leonesa	70	(0)
- * Club domestic league appearances and goals as of 31 May 2026

Miguel Bañuz Anton (born 26 June 1993) is a Spanish footballer who plays as a goalkeeper.

== Club career ==
=== Barcelona B ===
Born in Elche, Province of Alicante, Valencian Community, Bañuz played youth football for three clubs, spending three years with local Elche CF and finishing his development at FC Barcelona. On 22 December 2012 he made his senior debut with the latter's reserves, taking the place of Oier Olazábal after he was sent off in the last minute of a 4–4 home draw against Girona FC in the Segunda División (he replaced field player Luis Alberto de facto).

On 6 June 2014, Bañuz was released by Barça B after appearing in only five matches.

=== Villarreal B / Alcoyano ===
Bañuz joined another reserve team on 2 July 2014, Villarreal CF B of Segunda División B. On 8 August 2016, he signed a one-year contract with fellow league side CD Alcoyano.
