= Municipal de Barreiro =

Football stadium in Spain

Barreiro
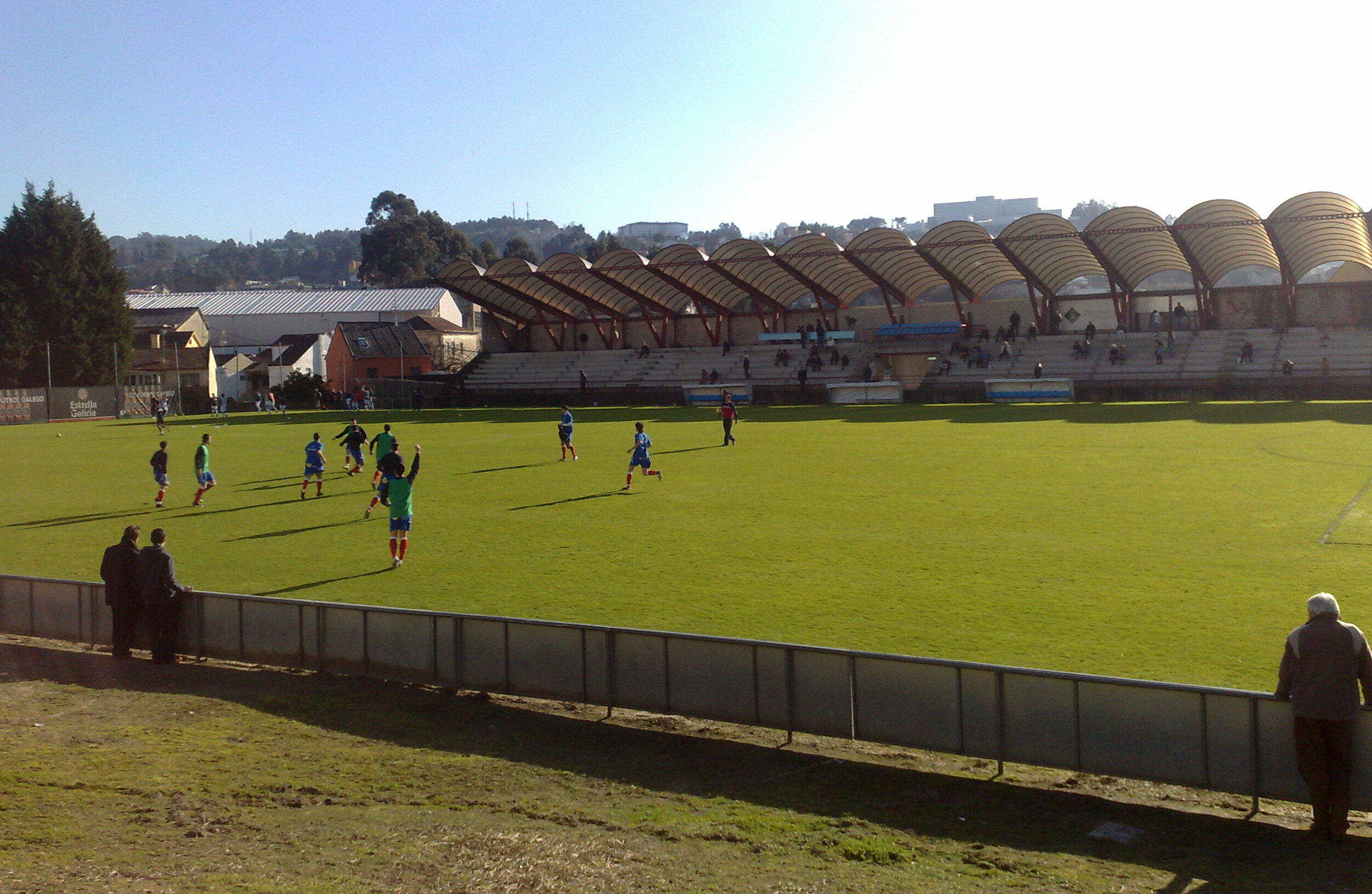
- Interactive map of Barreiro
- Full name: Campo de Fútbol Municipal de Barreiro
- Location: Avenida Ramón Nieto 326; 36214, Vigo, Spain
- Coordinates: 42.228610°N 8.68076°W
- Owner: Concello de Vigo
- Capacity: 4,500
- Surface: Grass
- Field size: 100.9 m × 65.5 m (331 ft × 215 ft)

Construction
- Built: 1920s
- Opened: 1920s
- Renovated: 1988, 2016

Tenants
- Unión Vigo (1922–1930); Gran Peña (1926–1989, 1991–present); Celta Fortuna (1927–2026)

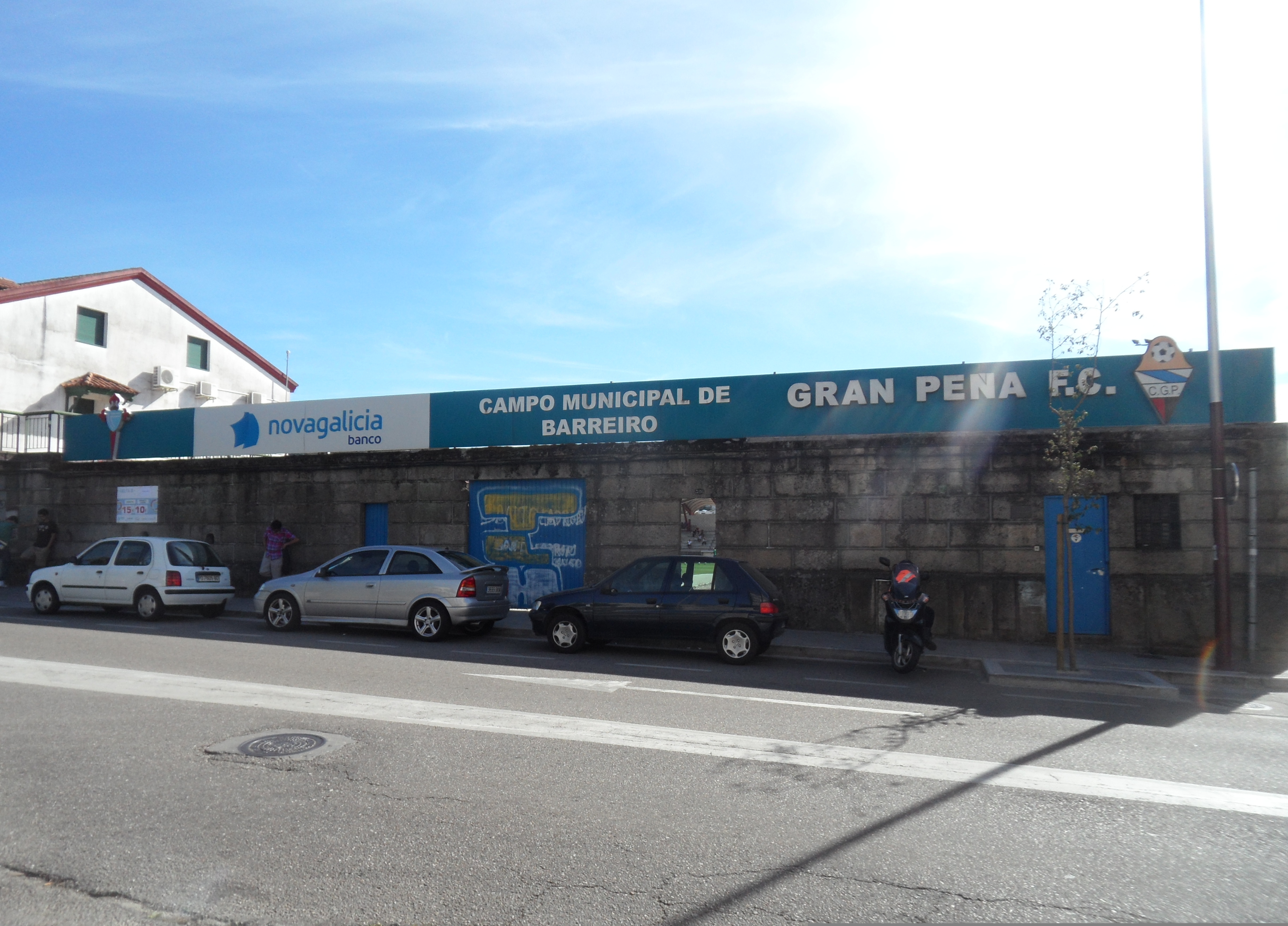
Campo Municipal de Barreiro

Campo de Fútbol Municipal de Barreiro is an all-seater football stadium located in Lavadores, Vigo.

The stadium is owned and operated by Vigo city council. Municipal de Barreiro was used by Unión Vigo when the club was founded, until 1930 when they changed to the Campo da Florida. It was also formerly used by Celta Fortuna, RC Celta de Vigo's reserve team since the club was founded as SC Turista. But in 2026, after the club was promoted to the Segunda División after winning the promotion play-offs against CE Europa and SD Ponferradina, the club officially changed their location to the much bigger Balaídos, home of the main team, due to the Barreiro not being adequated for games in the Segunda División. Nowadays, the stadium is only used by Gran Peña, who plays in the Tercera Federación.
