= Som Maresme FC =

Spanish football team

Som Maresme
- Full name: Som Maresme Futbol Club, S.A.D.
- Founded: 1947; 79 years ago (as Unión Deportiva Llagostera)
- Ground: Camp de Futbol Municipal, Premià de Dalt, Catalonia, Spain
- Capacity: 1,200
- President: Sedrak Petrosyan
- Head coach: Sergi Escobar
- 2024–25: Segunda Federación – Group 3, 18th of 18 (relegated)
- Website: sommaresmefc.com
Home colours	Away colours

Som Maresme Futbol Club, S.A.D. is a Spanish football team based in Premià de Dalt, Barcelona, in the Autonomous Community of Catalonia. Founded in 1947, it currently plays in Camp de fútbol municipal de Premià de Dalt, with a capacity for 1,200 spectators.

== History ==
UE Llagostera's logo used between 2014 and 2021

Leandro Calm, the mayor of the city, founded the club as Unión Deportiva Llagostera on 13 November 1947. He also became its first president. Llagostera spent most of its history in the Catalan regional leagues, promoting to Tercera División for the first time ahead of the 2009–10 season. In only its second season at that level, the club won its group before defeating CCD Cerceda 3–0 on aggregate in the promotion play-offs.

In 2011–12, its first season in Segunda División B, Llagostera finished only one point out of the play-offs, instead qualifying for the next season's Copa del Rey, where it reached the last 32 before a 5–1 aggregate loss to giants Valencia CF. The team was promoted to the professional leagues for the first time in 2014 with a 3–2 aggregate comeback win over Real Avilés and beating Gimnàstic de Tarragona after the overtime in the last round of the playoffs.

As their stadium did not meet LFP criteria for home games, Llagostera had as its home stadium from 2014 to 2017 the Estadi Palamós Costa Brava, 30 km from Llagostera, which holds 3,724 spectators. The club held its own in its first season in Segunda División, coming within four points of a play-off berth. It was relegated back to the third tier towards after two seasons.

On 30 June 2017, the club announced it would come back to the Estadi Municipal de Llagostera. One year later, Llagostera would be relegated to Tercera División, after losing the relegation playoffs against Izarra, but bounced back immediately with victory against Club Portugalete in June 2019.

In the 2020 Copa Federación de España, Llagostera emerged as champions following a 2–1 extra time win in the final. On 31 July 2021, the club announced the change of name to Unió Esportiva Costa Brava, moving to the city of Palamós and changing the club's logo.

On 19 July 2022, Costa Brava was absorbed by CF Badalona. As Badalona was relegated to Tercera Federación, Costa Brava changed name to Club de Fútbol Badalona Futur, with the original Badalona acting as a reserve team.

In the summer of 2023, the agreement between Badalona Futur and CF Badalona was broken, so Futur was forced to play its home games in Vic. In November the team won the Copa Federación.

In the summer of 2024, the team was relocated again, being based in Premià de Dalt, after the team failed to obtain the necessary permits in other previously proposed towns.

In January 2025, entrepreneur Sedrak Petrosyan bought Badalona Futur with the intention of making it disappear at the end of the 2024–25 season and create a new project for the next season based in Premià de Dalt. In June 2025, the club changed its name to Som Maresme FC. The new name was revealed with great discretion, as no journalists had leaked any information about the project's identity prior to the official announcement.

In August 2025, the Royal Spanish Football Federation rejected the club's application for registration in the Tercera Federación, on the grounds of the existence of debts that had not been paid. The board argued that the payments were made outside the established deadline and that they had been the responsibility of the previous management, so it filed an appeal, which was rejected. As a result, the team was relegated to the regional divisions of Catalonia. The Catalan Football Federation subsequently rejected the team's registration in the leagues organized by them, meaning Som Maresme is unable to compete in Spanish federated football.

On 19 September 2025, the Som Maresme board announced the team's hiatus due to the impossibility of competing in any category. In the same announcement, the club reported the initiation of a judicial process against the Catalan and Spanish football federations, arguing financial and competitive damages against the team.

=== Club background ===
Logo of UE Costa Brava (2021–22)

- 1947–1972: Unión Deportiva Llagostera
- 1972–1981: Club de Fútbol Llagostera
- 1981–2004: Unión Deportiva Llagostera
- 2004–2015: Unió Esportiva Llagostera
- 2015–2021: Unió Esportiva Llagostera-Costa Brava
- 2021–2022: Unió Esportiva Costa Brava
- 2022–2025: Club de Fútbol Badalona Futur
- 2025–: Som Maresme Futbol Club

== Season to season ==
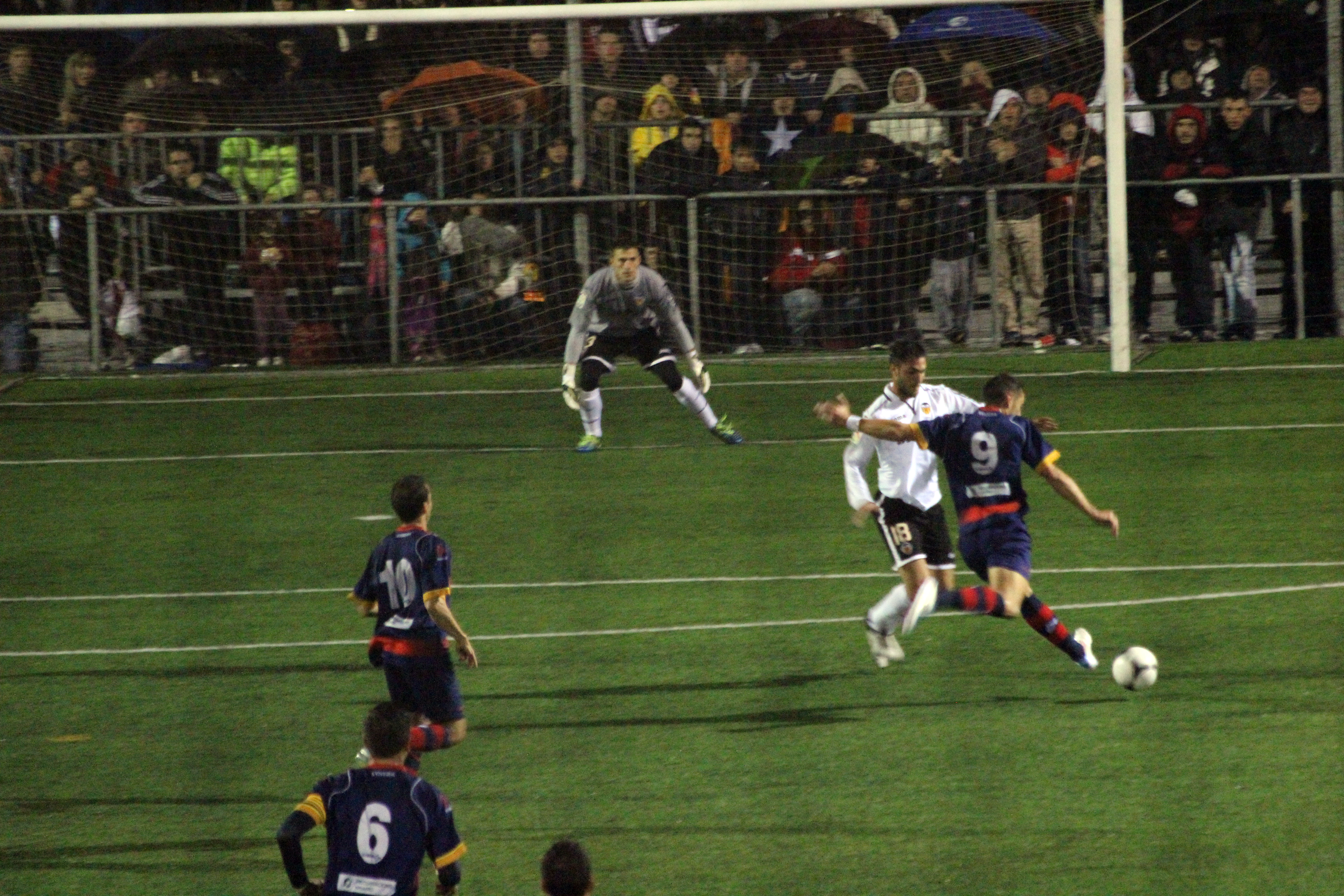
2012–13 Copa del Rey game against Valencia CF at Estadi Municipal de Llagostera.

Season	Tier	Division	Place	Copa del Rey
1947–1965	—	Regional	—	
1965–66	5	2ª Reg.	14th	
1966–67	5	2ª Reg.		
1967–68	5	2ª Reg.		
1968–69	5	1ª Reg.	20th	
1969–70	6	2ª Reg.		
1970–71	5	1ª Reg.	16th	
1971–72	6	2ª Reg.	10th	
1972–73	6	2ª Reg.	19th	
1973–74	7	3ª Reg.		
1974–75	7	3ª Reg.		
1975–76	7	3ª Reg.		
1976–77	7	3ª Reg.		
1977–78	8	3ª Reg.		
1978–79	8	3ª Reg.		
1979–80	8	3ª Reg.		
1980–81	7	2ª Reg.	19th	
1981–82	8	3ª Reg.		
1982–83	8	3ª Reg.		
1983–84	7	2ª Reg.	5th	

Season	Tier	Division	Place	Copa del Rey
1984–85	6	1ª Reg.	4th	
1985–86	6	1ª Reg.	6th	
1986–87	6	1ª Reg.	17th	
1987–88	6	1ª Reg.	11th	
1988–89	6	1ª Reg.	15th	
1989–90	6	1ª Reg.	17th	
1990–91	6	1ª Reg.	17th	
1991–92	7	1ª Terr.	17th	
1992–93	8	2ª Terr.	13th	
1993–94	8	2ª Terr.	11th	
1994–95	8	2ª Terr.	5th	
1995–96	8	2ª Terr.	7th	
1996–97	8	2ª Terr.	17th	
1997–98	9	3ª Terr.	1st	
1998–99	8	2ª Terr.	3rd	
1999–2000	8	2ª Terr.	6th	
2000–01	8	2ª Terr.	16th	
2001–02	8	2ª Terr.	14th	
2002–03	8	2ª Terr.	8th	
2003–04	8	2ª Terr.	16th	

Season	Tier	Division	Place	Copa del Rey
2004–05	8	2ª Terr.	2nd	
2005–06	7	1ª Terr.	1st	
2006–07	6	Pref. Terr.	8th	
2007–08	6	Pref. Terr.	2nd	
2008–09	5	1ª Cat.	3rd	
2009–10	4	3ª	7th	
2010–11	4	3ª	1st	
2011–12	3	2ª B	5th	Third round
2012–13	3	2ª B	10th	Round of 32
2013–14	3	2ª B	1st	
2014–15	2	2ª	9th	Second round
2015–16	2	2ª	20th	Round of 32
2016–17	3	2ª B	14th	Second round
2017–18	3	2ª B	16th	
2018–19	4	3ª	1st	
2019–20	3	2ª B	13th	First round
2020–21	3	2ª B	4th / 2nd	First round
2021–22	3	1ª RFEF	19th	
2022–23	4	2ª Fed.	8th	
2023–24	4	2ª Fed.	3rd	First round

Season	Tier	Division	Place	Copa del Rey
2024–25	4	2ª Fed.	18th	First round
2025–26	DNP			

- 2 seasons in Segunda División
- 1 season in Primera División RFEF
- 7 seasons in Segunda División B
- 3 seasons in Segunda Federación
- 3 seasons in Tercera División

== Players ==
=== Current squad ===
As of 30 August 2024

Note: Flags indicate national team as defined under FIFA eligibility rules; some limited exceptions apply. Players may hold more than one non-FIFA nationality.

No.	Pos.	Nation	Player
1	GK	UKR	Yaroslav Meykher
2	DF	ESP	Fran Grima
4	DF	ESP	Alejandro Marcos
5	DF	ARG	Manuel Guanini
6	MF	ESP	Ángel Climent
7	DF	ESP	Loren Fernández
8	MF	ESP	Pablo Hernández
9	FW	ESP	Moha Traoré
10	MF	ESP	Nando Quesada
11	FW	FRA	Jean-Paul N'Djoli
12	DF	ESP	Ricard Pulido
13	GK	ESP	Iker Candón

No.	Pos.	Nation	Player
14	FW	ESP	Guille Andrés
15	MF	ESP	Alberto Villapalos
16	MF	MAR	Sami el Mahboubi
17	FW	COL	Richard Franco
18	MF	ESP	Markel Rodríguez
19	FW	ESP	Edgar Martínez
20	MF	ESP	Gorka Iturraspe
21	MF	ITA	Lucca Giuntini
22	DF	GHA	Philip Osei
23	FW	ESP	Gabi García
24	DF	ESP	Toni Peris
25	GK	ESP	Josan Gordo (on loan from Real Betis)

== Notable players ==
Note: this list includes players that have played at least 100 league games and/or have reached international status.

- (Spain) Oriol Alsina
- (Spain) Aimar Moratalla
- (Spain) Jordi Masó
- (Spain) Enric Pi
- (Spain) Pitu
- (Spain) Pere Tarradellas
- (Spain) Tito
- (Spain) Vallho

== Crest ==
Crest evolution
2004–2014	2014–2021	2021–2022	2022–2023	2023–2025	2025–

== Honours ==
=== League ===
- Segunda División B
  - Winners: 2013–14
- Tercera División
  - Winners: 2010–11, 2018–19
- Tercera Catalana
  - Winners: 2005–06

=== Cups ===
- Spanish Royal Federation Cup
  - Winners: 2020, 2023
