= 2025–26 Primera Federación =

Primera Federación
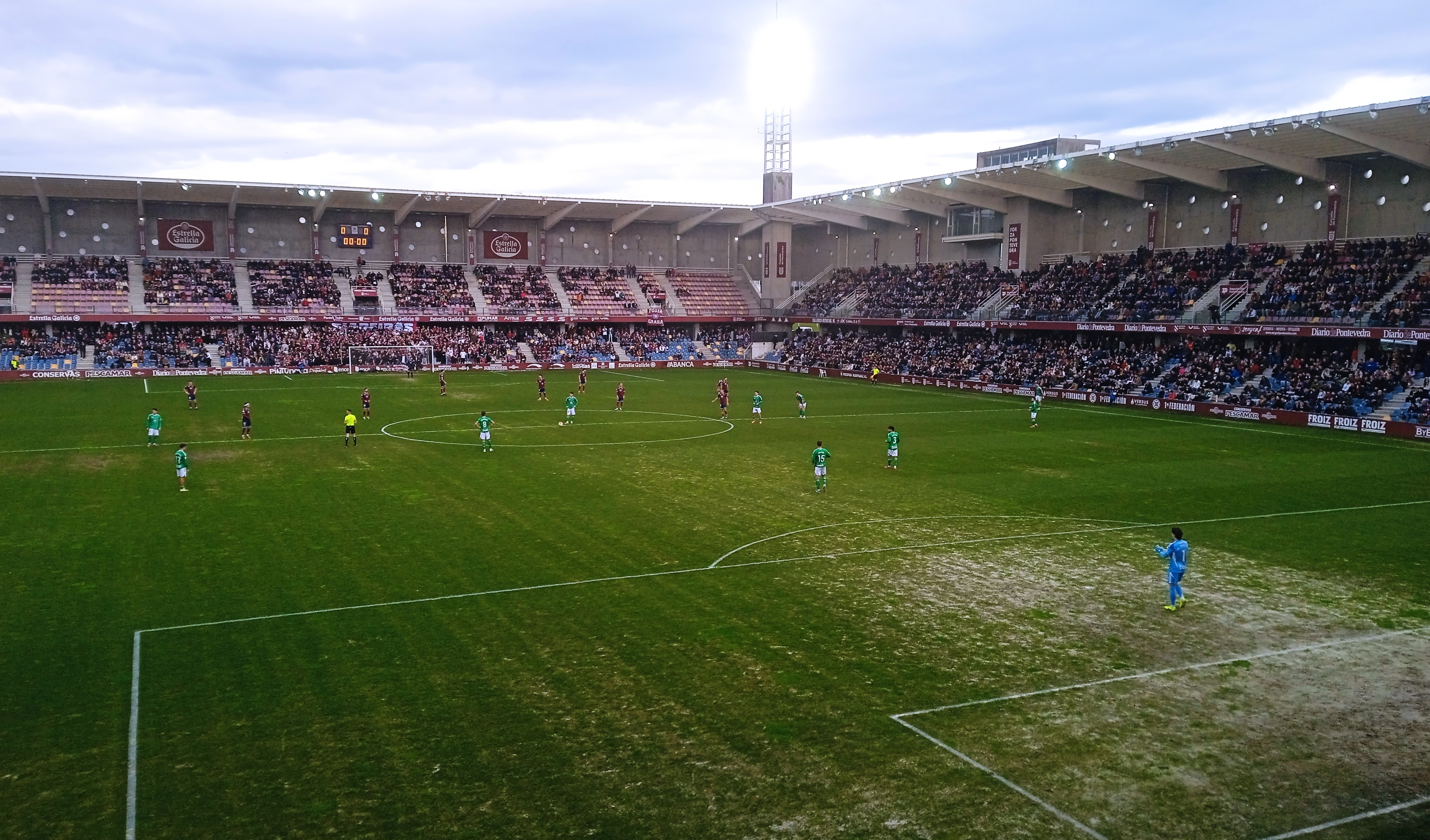
- Pontevedra v Racing Ferrol on 3 January 2026
- Season: 2025–26
- Dates: 29 August 2025 – June 2026
- Promoted: Tenerife; Eldense; Sabadell; Celta Fortuna
- Relegated: Arenteiro; Atlético Sanluqueño; Betis Deportivo; Guadalajara; Marbella; Osasuna B Ourense CF; Sevilla Atlético; Talavera de la Reina; Tarazona
- Top goalscorer: Arnau Ortiz (23 goals)

The 2025–26 Primera Federación season is the fifth for the Primera Federación, the third-highest level in the Spanish football league system. Forty teams participate, divided into two groups of twenty clubs each based on geographical proximity. In each group, the champions are automatically promoted to Segunda División and the second to fifth placers will play promotion play-offs and the bottom five are relegated to the Segunda Federación.

== Overview ==
A total of 40 teams joined the league, including four relegated from the 2024–25 Segunda División, 26 retained from the 2024–25 Primera Federación, and ten promoted from the 2024–25 Segunda Federación. RFEF released the groups on 27 June 2025.

=== Team changes ===
Promoted from 2024–25 Segunda Federación	Relegated from 2024–25 Segunda División	Promoted to 2025–26 Segunda División	Relegated to 2025–26 Segunda Federación
Arenas; Avilés; Cacereño; Europa; Guadalajara; Juventud Torremolinos; Pontevedra; Sabadell; Talavera de la Reina; Teruel	Cartagena; Eldense; Racing Ferrol; Tenerife	Andorra; Ceuta; Cultural Leonesa; Real Sociedad B	Alcoyano; Amorebieta; Barcelona Atlètic; Fuenlabrada; Gimnástica Segoviana; Intercity; Recreativo; Real Unión; Sestao River; Yeclano

== Group 1 (North West) ==
Location of teams in 2025–26 Primera Federación – Group 1
Location of teams in 2025–26 Primera Federación (Canary Islands)

=== Teams and locations ===
Team	Home city	Stadium	Capacity
Arenas	Getxo	Gobela	2,000
Arenteiro	O Carballiño	Espiñedo	4,500
Avilés Industrial	Avilés	Román Suárez Puerta	5,400
Barakaldo	Barakaldo	Lasesarre	7,960
Bilbao Athletic	Bilbao	Lezama	3,250
Cacereño	Cáceres	Príncipe Felipe	7,000
Celta Fortuna	Vigo	Estadio ABANCA Balaídos	24,870
Guadalajara	Guadalajara	Pedro Escartín	8,000
Lugo	Lugo	Anxo Carro	7,070
Mérida	Mérida	Estadio Romano	14,600
Osasuna B	Pamplona	Tajonar	4,500
Ourense CF	Ourense	O Couto	5,659
Ponferradina	Ponferrada	El Toralín	8,400
Pontevedra	Pontevedra	Pasarón	12,000
Racing Ferrol	Ferrol	A Malata	12,043
Real Madrid Castilla	Madrid	Alfredo di Stéfano	6,000
Talavera de la Reina	Talavera de la Reina	El Prado	5,000
Tenerife	Santa Cruz de Tenerife	Heliodoro Rodríguez López	22,824
Unionistas	Salamanca	Reina Sofía	5,000
Zamora	Zamora	Ruta de la Plata	7,813

=== Personnel and sponsorship ===
Team	Manager	Captain	Kit manufacturer	Shirt main sponsor
Arenas	(Spain) Jon Erice	(Spain) Jon Sillero	Hummel	
Arenteiro	(Spain) Juanfran	(Spain) Diego García	Kappa	Oreco Balgón Constructora
Avilés Industrial	(Spain) Lolo Escobar	(Spain) Natalio	Noone Sports	Avilés Ciudad Milenaria
Barakaldo	(Spain) Imanol de la Sota	(Spain) Ekaitz Molina	New Balance	SR Financial
Bilbao Athletic	(Spain) Jokin Aranbarri	(Spain) Ibon Sánchez	Castore	
Cacereño	(Spain) Julio Cobos	(Spain) Deco	Adidas	Extremadura
Celta Fortuna	(Spain) Fredi Álvarez	(Spain) Pablo Meixús	Hummel	Estrella Galicia
Guadalajara	(Spain) Juanvi Peinado	(Spain) Javier Ablanque	Kappa	Hercesa
Lugo	(Spain) Álex Ortiz (caretaker)	(Spain) Marc Martínez	Puma	Estrella Galicia
Mérida	(Spain) Fran Beltrán	(Spain) Pipe	Macron	Mérida
Osasuna B	(Spain) Santi Castillejo	(Spain) Carlos Lumbreras	Macron	Jaylo
Ourense CF	(Spain) Cándido Gómez	(Spain) Hugo Sanz	Cool Sport	Estrella Galicia
Ponferradina	(Tunisia) Mehdi Nafti	(Spain) Borja Valle	Adidas	Tvitec
Pontevedra	(Spain) Rubén Domínguez	(Spain) Álex González	Kappa	
Racing Ferrol	(Spain) Guillermo Fernández Romo	(Spain) Álvaro Giménez	Adidas	Estrella Galicia
Real Madrid Castilla	(Spain) Julián López de Lerma	(Spain) Manuel Ángel	Adidas	Emirates
Talavera de la Reina	(Argentina) Alejandro Sandroni	(Spain) Edu Gallardo	Joma	Cálida PVC
Tenerife	(Spain) Álvaro Cervera	(Spain) Aitor Sanz	Hummel	Egatesa
Unionistas	(Spain) Mario Simón	(Spain) Ramiro Mayor	Erreà	Telefurgo
Zamora	(Spain) Óscar Cano	(Spain) Carlos Ramos	Macron	Caja Rural

=== Managerial changes ===
Team	Outgoing manager	Manner of departure	Date of vacancy	Position in table	Incoming manager	Date of appointment
Real Madrid Castilla	(Spain) Raúl	Resigned	27 May 2025	Pre-season	(Spain) Álvaro Arbeloa	28 May 2025
Lugo	(Spain) Álex Ortiz	Sacked	19 June 2025	Pre-season	(Spain) Yago Iglesias	19 June 2025
Pontevedra	(Spain) Yago Iglesias	End of contract	30 June 2025	Pre-season	(Spain) Rubén Domínguez	30 May 2025
Unionistas	(Argentina) José Acciari	End of contract	30 June 2025	Pre-season	(Spain) Oriol Riera	19 June 2025
Racing Ferrol	(Spain) Alejandro Menéndez	End of contract	30 June 2025	Pre-season	(Spain) Pablo López	4 June 2025
Ourense CF	(Spain) Pablo López	End of contract	30 June 2025	Pre-season	(Spain) Dani Llácer	19 July 2025
Arenteiro	(Spain) Raúl Jardiel	End of contract	30 June 2025	Pre-season	(Spain) Jesús Arribas	17 June 2025
Arenas	(Spain) Ibai Gómez	End of contract	30 June 2025	Pre-season	(Spain) Jon Erice	13 June 2025
Talavera de la Reina	(Spain) Javi Vázquez	End of contract	30 June 2025	Pre-season	(Spain) Diego Nogales	26 June 2025
Mérida	(Spain) Sergi Guilló	End of contract	30 June 2025	Pre-season	(Spain) Fran Beltrán	28 June 2025
Ponferradina	(Spain) Javi Rey	End of contract	30 June 2025	Pre-season	(Spain) Fernando Estévez	28 June 2025
Avilés Industrial	(Spain) Javi Rozada	Sacked	12 August 2025	Pre-season	(Spain) Dani Vidal	18 August 2025
Unionistas	(Spain) Oriol Riera	Signed by Istra 1961	17 September 2025	20th	(Spain) Mario Simón	17 September 2025
Zamora	(Spain) Juan Sabas	Sacked	3 November 2025	12th	(Spain) Óscar Cano	4 November 2025
Arenteiro	(Spain) Jesús Arribas	Sacked	9 November 2025	19th	(Spain) Luis Vilachá (caretaker)	10 November 2025
Arenteiro	(Spain) Luis Vilachá	End of caretaker spell	17 November 2025	20th	(Spain) Jorge Cuesta	17 November 2025
Ponferradina	(Spain) Fernando Estévez	Sacked	25 November 2025	13th	(Tunisia) Mehdi Nafti	26 November 2025
Talavera de la Reina	(Spain) Diego Nogales	Sacked	2 December 2025	19th	(Argentina) Alejandro Sandroni	2 December 2025
Racing Ferrol	(Spain) Pablo López	Sacked	7 January 2026	5th	(Spain) Míchel Alonso (caretaker)	8 January 2026
Racing Ferrol	(Spain) Míchel Alonso	End of caretaker spell	12 January 2026	7th	(Spain) Guillermo Fernández Romo	12 January 2026
Real Madrid Castilla	(Spain) Álvaro Arbeloa	Promoted to the first team	12 January 2026	4th	(Spain) Julián López de Lerma	13 January 2026
Guadalajara	(Spain) Pere Martí	Sacked	12 January 2026	19th	(Spain) Juanvi Peinado	14 January 2026
Arenteiro	(Spain) Jorge Cuesta	Sacked	2 March 2026	19th	(Spain) Juanfran	3 March 2026
Lugo	(Spain) Yago Iglesias	Sacked	22 March 2026	9th	(Spain) Álex Ortiz (caretaker)	22 March 2026
Avilés Industrial	(Spain) Dani Vidal	Sacked	23 March 2026	14th	(Spain) Lolo Escobar	23 March 2026
Ourense CF	(Spain) Dani Llácer	Sacked	13 May 2026	18th	(Spain) Cándido Gómez	13 May 2026

==== League table ====
Pos	Team	Pld	W	D	L	GF	GA	GD	Pts	Qualification
1	Tenerife (C, P)	38	22	10	6	62	24	+38	76	Promotion to Segunda División and qualification for the Copa del Rey
2	Celta Fortuna (O, P)	38	18	11	9	61	48	+13	65	Qualification for the promotion play-offs
3	Zamora	38	17	10	11	53	42	+11	61	Qualification for the promotion play-offs and Copa del Rey
4	Ponferradina	38	17	9	12	43	33	+10	60	Qualification for the promotion play-offs and Copa del Rey
5	Real Madrid Castilla	38	16	10	12	61	52	+9	58 (Note: Head-to-head points: Real Madrid Castilla 7 pts, Pontevedra 7 pts, Barakaldo 3 pts. Real Madrid Castilla finished ahead of Pontevedra on head-to-head points: Real Madrid Castilla 1–0 Pontevedra, Pontevedra 0–0 Real Madrid Castilla)	Qualification for the promotion play-offs
6	Pontevedra	38	14	16	8	49	31	+18	58	Qualification for the Copa del Rey
7	Barakaldo	38	15	13	10	51	38	+13	58	Qualification for the Copa del Rey
8	Unionistas	38	15	11	12	53	49	+4	56	Qualification for the Copa del Rey due to coefficient (Note: As Real Sociedad B were in Segunda División, another spot in the Copa del Rey was vacant, and was given to the non-reserve team of best coefficient between both groups, not already qualified)
9	Lugo	38	13	14	11	36	40	−4	53	
10	Mérida	38	14	10	14	47	53	−6	52 (Note: Mérida finished ahead of Arenas on head-to-head goal difference: Mérida 3–0 Arenas, Arenas 2–0 Mérida)	
11	Arenas	38	15	7	16	46	55	−9	52	
12	Racing Ferrol	38	13	10	15	41	47	−6	49 (Note: Racing Ferrol finished ahead of Bilbao Athletic on overall goal difference)	
13	Bilbao Athletic	38	13	10	15	38	46	−8	49	
14	Avilés	38	11	11	16	55	67	−12	44 (Note: Avilés finished ahead of Cacereño on head-to-head points: Cacereño 0–4 Avilés, Avilés 1–1 Cacereño)	
15	Cacereño	38	10	14	14	42	49	−7	44	
16	Talavera de la Reina (R)	38	11	10	17	38	47	−9	43 (Note: Talavera de la Reina finished ahead of Ourense CF on head-to-head points: Ourense CF 1–2 Talavera de la Reina, Talavera de la Reina 0–0 Ourense CF)	Relegation to Segunda Federación
17	Ourense CF (R)	38	10	13	15	44	47	−3	43	Relegation to Segunda Federación
18	Guadalajara (R)	38	10	11	17	44	58	−14	41	Relegation to Segunda Federación
19	Osasuna B (R)	38	10	10	18	28	42	−14	40	Relegation to Segunda Federación
20	Arenteiro (D, R)	38	6	10	22	29	53	−24	28	Administrative relegation to Tercera Federación (Note: Arenteiro relegated to 2026–27 Tercera Federación due to economic problems.)

Source: RFEF
Rules for classification: 1) points; 2) head-to-head points; 3) head-to-head goal difference; 4) goal difference; 5) number of goals scored
(Note: Head-to-head record is used only after all the matches between the teams in question have been played).
(C) Champions; (D) Disqualified; (O) Play-off winners; (P) Promoted; (R) Relegated

=== Results ===
Home \ Away	ANS	ANT	AVI	BAR	ATH	CAC	CEL	GUA	LUG	MER	OSA	OUR	PNF	PNT	RFE	RMC	TAL	TEN	UNI	ZAM
Arenas	—	2–1	3–2	2–1	3–1	2–2	0–5	3–0	0–0	2–0	1–0	2–1	0–1	1–0	1–1	4–1	1–2	1–4	2–1	1–0
Arenteiro	1–2	—	6–3	1–1	1–1	0–4	1–1	0–0	0–2	0–2	2–0	0–2	0–1	0–0	0–2	2–2	1–0	0–1	1–0	0–0
Avilés	0–0	1–0	—	1–4	3–2	1–1	1–2	2–2	1–2	1–2	2–0	2–1	0–3	0–3	2–1	1–1	1–1	0–1	1–1	0–2
Barakaldo	2–1	1–1	1–2	—	2–1	1–1	1–1	2–1	3–0	2–0	1–0	1–0	0–0	0–1	2–1	2–1	2–1	2–0	5–0	1–1
Bilbao Athletic	1–1	2–1	0–2	2–0	—	1–3	1–2	2–1	2–0	1–1	0–0	2–2	1–0	1–0	0–1	1–0	1–2	0–0	0–0	1–0
Cacereño	2–0	0–2	0–4	0–0	1–0	—	2–3	1–1	1–2	2–1	1–2	0–0	0–0	1–0	0–1	4–1	1–2	0–0	3–3	0–2
Celta Fortuna	2–0	2–1	4–2	1–2	2–1	3–0	—	0–1	0–1	1–1	0–1	0–0	2–0	1–2	2–1	1–0	4–3	1–1	2–0	3–3
Guadalajara	1–0	2–0	3–4	1–1	2–3	1–1	3–0	—	1–1	0–2	1–0	1–0	0–1	1–4	1–0	2–2	1–1	0–2	2–0	2–3
Lugo	1–1	0–0	0–0	2–2	1–0	1–0	2–0	2–0	—	1–0	0–1	2–1	0–2	1–0	2–1	0–4	0–0	2–2	1–3	1–3
Mérida	3–0	3–1	2–1	1–0	2–3	1–0	2–4	1–4	0–2	—	1–0	3–2	0–0	1–1	2–1	3–0	0–0	1–1	1–1	2–0
Osasuna B	2–3	1–0	0–1	2–0	0–1	2–2	1–1	4–3	0–0	1–2	—	1–1	0–0	0–0	1–2	1–0	2–1	0–2	0–2	1–3
Ourense CF	1–0	2–0	2–1	2–2	0–0	0–1	2–4	3–0	4–2	3–1	2–0	—	0–0	1–2	1–1	1–3	1–2	2–1	4–3	1–2
Ponferradina	1–2	1–3	3–1	1–0	1–0	2–0	0–0	1–3	1–1	4–1	0–1	2–0	—	0–1	3–0	2–3	1–0	1–1	3–1	2–0
Pontevedra	2–0	1–1	2–2	2–0	4–0	1–1	1–1	1–1	1–1	1–1	2–2	0–0	3–1	—	2–1	0–0	2–1	0–2	0–0	4–1
Racing Ferrol	3–1	2–0	2–2	0–0	0–1	3–1	1–2	0–0	1–1	2–2	0–0	1–1	2–1	0–0	—	0–5	2–1	0–2	2–1	1–0
Real Madrid Castilla	3–3	2–0	2–0	2–1	2–1	2–0	5–1	3–1	2–1	1–1	1–1	1–1	0–1	1–0	0–1	—	1–0	1–3	1–0	2–2
Talavera de la Reina	2–1	2–1	1–1	1–1	1–1	0–1	1–1	2–0	1–0	2–1	2–0	0–0	0–1	0–4	3–1	1–2	—	0–0	0–1	0–1
Tenerife	2–0	1–0	2–2	2–0	0–1	1–1	4–0	4–0	1–1	3–0	1–0	3–0	2–0	3–0	0–1	4–2	1–0	—	0–2	3–1
Unionistas	2–0	3–1	3–2	0–3	1–1	2–2	0–2	1–0	0–0	2–0	0–1	1–0	2–2	1–1	3–2	3–0	5–1	2–1	—	0–0
Zamora	1–0	1–0	2–3	2–2	4–1	1–2	0–0	1–1	1–0	3–0	1–0	0–0	3–0	2–1	1–0	2–2	2–1	0–1	2–3	—

Legend: Blue = home team win; Yellow = draw; Red = away team win.

=== Top scorers ===
As of 23 May 2026

Rank	Player	Club	Goal
1	(Spain) Enric Gallego	Tenerife	19
2	(Spain) Hugo González	Celta Fortuna	14
2	(Spain) César Palacios	Real Madrid Castilla	14
4	(Spain) Víctor Mingo	Arenteiro	12
4	(Spain) Álvaro García	Mérida AD	12
4	(Spain) Unax Álvarez	Guadalajara	12

== Group 2 (South East) ==
Location of teams in 2025–26 Primera Federación – Group 2

=== Teams and locations ===
Team	Home city	Stadium	Capacity
Alcorcón	Alcorcón	Santo Domingo	5,100
Algeciras	Algeciras	Nuevo Mirador	7,200
Antequera	Antequera	El Maulí	6,000
Atlético Madrileño	Alcalá de Henares	Centro Deportivo Alcalá de Henares	2,685
Atlético Sanluqueño	Sanlúcar de Barrameda	El Palmar	5,000
Betis Deportivo	Seville	Luis del Sol	1,300
Cartagena	Cartagena	Cartagonova	15,105
Eldense	Elda	Estadio Pepico Amat	4,036
Europa	Barcelona	Nou Sardenya	7,000
Gimnàstic	Tarragona	Nou Estadi	14,591
Hércules	Alicante	José Rico Pérez	30,000
Ibiza	Ibiza	Can Misses	6,000
Juventud Torremolinos	Torremolinos	El Pozuelo	3,000
Marbella	Marbella	Municipal de Marbella	7,300
Murcia	Murcia	Enrique Roca	31,179
Sabadell	Sabadell	Nova Creu Alta	11,908
Sevilla Atlético	Seville	Jesús Navas	8,000
Tarazona	Tarazona	Municipal de Tarazona	5,000
Teruel	Teruel	Pinilla	4,500
Villarreal B	Villarreal	Estadio de la Cerámica	23,000

=== Personnel and sponsorship ===
Team	Manager	Captain	Kit manufacturer	Shirt main sponsor
Alcorcón	(Spain) Pablo Álvarez	(Spain) David Navarro	Kappa	Lynks Tic
Algeciras	(Spain) Javi Vázquez	(Spain) Iván Turrillo	Nike	
Antequera	(Spain) Abraham Paz	(Spain) Luismi Gutiérrez	Hummel	Grupo Sancho Melero
Atlético Madrileño	(Spain) Fernando Torres	(Spain) Jorge Castillo	Nike	
Atlético Sanluqueño	(Spain) Pedro Mateos	(Spain) Zeki Díaz	Macron	Cohebu
Betis Deportivo	(Spain) Dani Fragoso	(Spain) Pablo Busto	Hummel	Forever Green
Cartagena	(Spain) Iñigo Vélez	(Spain) Alfredo Ortuño	Macron	Avatel
Eldense	(Spain) Claudio Barragán	(Spain) Jesús Clemente	Hummel	
Europa	(Spain) Aday Benítez	(Spain) Álex Cano	Hummel	
Gimnàstic	(Spain) Pablo Alfaro	(Spain) Óscar Sanz	Adidas	Parlem
Hércules	(Spain) Beto Company	(Spain) Nico Espinosa	Kappa	Ekokai
Ibiza	(Spain) Miguel Álvarez	(Spain) Unai Medina	Puma	Power Electronics
Juventud Torremolinos	(Spain) Carlos Alós	(Spain) Dani Fernández	Umbro	
Marbella	(Spain) David Cabello	(Spain) Gabriel Clemente	Adidas	Marbella
Murcia	(Spain) Curro Torres	(Spain) Pedro León	Joma	Inversus Group
Sabadell	(Spain) Ferran Costa	(Spain) Rubén Martínez	Kappa	
Sevilla Atlético	(Spain) Marco García	(Spain) Alberto Flores	Adidas	
Tarazona	(Spain) Juanma Barrero	(Spain) David Cubillas	Adidas	
Teruel	(Spain) Vicente Parras	(Spain) Rubén Gálvez	Soka	
Villarreal B	(Spain) David Albelda	(Spain) Víctor Moreno	Joma	Pamesa Cerámica

=== Managerial changes ===
Team	Outgoing manager	Manner of departure	Date of vacancy	Position in table	Incoming manager	Date of appointment
Betis Deportivo	(Spain) Arzu	End of contract	30 June 2025	Pre-season	(Spain) Javi Medina	16 June 2025
Villarreal B	(Spain) Miguel Álvarez	End of contract	30 June 2025	Pre-season	(Spain) David Albelda	29 May 2025
Cartagena	(Spain) Guillermo Fernández Romo	End of contract	30 June 2025	Pre-season	(Spain) Javi Rey	4 July 2025
Eldense	(Spain) José Luis Oltra	End of contract	30 June 2025	Pre-season	(Spain) Javier Cabello	28 June 2025
Teruel	(Spain) Unai Mendia	End of contract	30 June 2025	Pre-season	(Spain) Vicente Parras	12 June 2025
Algeciras	(Spain) Fran Justo	End of contract	30 June 2025	Pre-season	(Spain) Javi Vázquez	14 June 2025
Antequera	(Spain) Javi Medina	End of contract	30 June 2025	Pre-season	(Spain) Abel Gómez	16 June 2025
Sabadell	(Spain) David Movilla	End of contract	30 June 2025	Pre-season	(Spain) Ferran Costa	23 June 2025
Murcia	(Spain) Fran Fernández	End of contract	30 June 2025	Pre-season	(Spain) Joseba Etxeberria	3 July 2025
Eldense	(Spain) Javier Cabello	Sacked	19 October 2025	12th	(Spain) Claudio Barragán (Note: Originally as caretaker manager, appointed on a permanent basis on 14 November 2025.)	19 October 2025
Ibiza	(Spain) Paco Jémez	Sacked	21 October 2025	8th	(Spain) Miguel Álvarez	22 October 2025
Murcia	(Spain) Joseba Etxeberria	Sacked	28 October 2025	19th	(Spain) Adrián Colunga (Note: Originally as caretaker manager, appointed on a permanent basis on 20 November 2025.)	28 October 2025
Gimnàstic	(Spain) Luis César Sampedro	Sacked	3 November 2025	6th	(Spain) Cristóbal Parralo	4 November 2025
Sevilla Atlético	(Spain) Jesús Galván	Signed by Mirandés	7 November 2025	18th	(Spain) Luci	7 November 2025
Marbella	(Spain) Carlos De Lerma	Sacked	11 November 2025	18th	(Spain) David Movilla	11 November 2025
Hércules	(Spain) Rubén Torrecilla	Sacked	16 November 2025	13th	(Spain) Beto Company	17 November 2025
Antequera	(Spain) Abel Gómez	Sacked	24 November 2025	16th	(Spain) Alberto Aguilar (caretaker)	24 November 2025
Antequera	(Spain) Alberto Aguilar	End of caretaker spell	30 November 2025	16th	(Spain) Abraham Paz	30 November 2025
Betis Deportivo	(Spain) Javi Medina	Sacked	26 December 2025	20th	(Spain) Dani Fragoso	26 December 2025
Atlético Sanluqueño	(Spain) José Herrera	Sacked	29 December 2025	19th	(Spain) Daniel Casas	30 December 2025
Marbella	(Spain) David Movilla	Sacked	7 January 2026	18th	(Spain) David Cabello	7 January 2026
Atlético Sanluqueño	(Spain) Daniel Casas	Returned to previous role	14 January 2026	18th	(Spain) Pedro Mateos	14 January 2026
Cartagena	(Spain) Javi Rey	Sacked	27 January 2026	11th	(Spain) Raúl Guillén (caretaker)	27 January 2026
Cartagena	(Spain) Raúl Guillén	End of caretaker spell	18 February 2026	13th	(Spain) Iñigo Vélez	18 February 2026
Murcia	(Spain) Adrián Colunga	Sacked	23 February 2026	15th	(Spain) Curro Torres	23 February 2026
Gimnàstic	(Spain) Cristóbal Parralo	Sacked	8 March 2026	14th	(Spain) Pablo Alfaro	9 March 2026
Sevilla Atlético	(Spain) Luci	Sacked	9 March 2026	20th	(Spain) Marco García	9 March 2026
Juventud Torremolinos	(Spain) Antonio Calderón	Mutual consent	6 April 2026	14th	(Spain) Carlos Alós	9 April 2026

=== League table ===
Pos	Team	Pld	W	D	L	GF	GA	GD	Pts	Qualification
1	Eldense (C, P)	38	19	12	7	57	39	+18	69	Promotion to Segunda División and qualification for the Copa del Rey
2	Sabadell (O, P)	38	18	14	6	53	27	+26	68	Qualification for the promotion play-offs and Copa del Rey
3	Atlético Madrileño	38	19	10	9	64	44	+20	67	Qualification for the promotion play-offs
4	Villarreal B	38	16	15	7	54	32	+22	63	Qualification for the promotion play-offs
5	Europa	38	16	12	10	55	50	+5	60	Qualification for the promotion play-offs and Copa del Rey
6	Cartagena	38	15	12	11	37	38	−1	57	Qualification for the Copa del Rey
7	Antequera	38	16	8	14	47	44	+3	56	Qualification for the Copa del Rey
8	Algeciras	38	15	10	13	40	41	−1	55	
9	Hércules	38	14	12	12	43	41	+2	54	
10	Murcia	38	14	10	14	43	40	+3	52	
11	Alcorcón	38	12	15	11	44	38	+6	51	
12	Ibiza	38	13	11	14	44	38	+6	50	
13	Teruel	38	12	13	13	27	33	−6	49	
14	Gimnàstic	38	13	8	17	40	49	−9	47	
15	Juventud Torremolinos	38	11	13	14	45	51	−6	46	
16	Betis Deportivo (R)	38	12	9	17	48	59	−11	45 (Note: Betis Deportivo finished ahead of Tarazona on head-to-head goal difference: Tarazona 1–0 Betis Deportivo, Betis Deportivo 3–0 Tarazona)	Relegation to Segunda Federación
17	Tarazona (D, R)	38	11	12	15	31	40	−9	45	Administrative relegation to Tercera Federación (Note: Tarazona relegated to 2026–27 Tercera Federación due to economic problems.)
18	Marbella (R)	38	9	7	22	36	55	−19	34	Relegation to Segunda Federación
19	Atlético Sanluqueño (R)	38	7	10	21	27	53	−26	31	Relegation to Segunda Federación
20	Sevilla Atlético (R)	38	5	13	20	20	43	−23	28	Relegation to Segunda Federación

Updated to match(es) played on 24 May 2026. Source: RFEF
Rules for classification: 1) points; 2) head-to-head points; 3) head-to-head goal difference; 4) goal difference; 5) number of goals scored
(Note: Head-to-head record is used only after all the matches between the teams in question have been played)
(C) Champions; (D) Disqualified; (O) Play-off winners; (P) Promoted; (R) Relegated

=== Results ===
Home \ Away	ALC	ALG	ANT	ATM	ASL	BET	CAR	ELD	EUR	GIM	HER	IBI	JUV	MAR	MUR	SAB	SEV	TAR	TER	VIL
Alcorcón	—	0–0	2–1	0–1	0–0	3–0	1–1	1–1	0–1	1–1	4–0	2–2	1–1	6–2	1–0	0–3	0–0	1–0	2–1	2–3
Algeciras	1–0	—	1–0	1–0	3–0	2–0	2–2	1–1	2–3	1–0	0–2	0–0	1–0	0–0	1–0	1–2	3–0	1–0	0–0	0–0
Antequera	1–2	2–0	—	2–4	2–0	2–1	0–0	2–1	0–2	4–2	1–1	0–3	3–1	3–1	0–2	0–0	1–1	2–3	1–0	0–1
Atlético Madrileño	0–0	3–1	3–2	—	0–0	3–1	2–0	1–1	2–0	1–2	0–0	2–0	3–1	5–4	1–1	4–3	1–0	1–1	3–0	1–1
Atlético Sanluqueño	0–1	0–1	1–3	1–2	—	1–4	3–0	1–4	1–3	1–0	1–1	0–0	0–2	3–2	0–2	2–2	0–0	2–1	1–1	1–1
Betis Deportivo	2–1	1–1	1–0	0–2	1–0	—	0–1	0–1	2–2	2–2	2–1	3–2	2–0	0–1	1–2	1–2	3–1	3–0	2–2	1–4
Cartagena	2–1	2–0	1–0	3–2	1–0	2–2	—	0–0	2–2	1–0	2–1	1–4	3–0	2–1	0–1	0–0	1–0	3–0	0–0	0–2
Eldense	2–2	3–2	1–3	2–1	1–0	2–0	2–1	—	3–0	4–1	2–0	3–0	3–3	3–1	1–1	2–1	1–0	1–0	2–0	1–0
Europa	0–0	0–3	2–0	2–2	2–1	5–2	2–0	1–1	—	2–0	1–1	3–2	2–3	2–1	0–2	2–0	1–1	1–1	1–0	3–3
Gimnàstic	1–2	2–1	0–1	0–3	1–3	2–2	2–0	3–0	2–1	—	2–2	1–0	2–0	1–0	2–1	0–0	2–1	2–1	0–1	0–1
Hércules	0–0	0–1	0–1	3–0	0–0	2–0	2–0	2–1	1–0	1–1	—	2–1	2–1	2–0	2–0	1–5	0–0	1–0	3–1	2–1
Ibiza	2–2	3–0	1–1	2–0	4–0	0–0	3–1	0–1	1–1	0–2	1–0	—	2–1	0–1	2–0	2–0	0–1	1–0	0–1	0–0
Juventud Torremolinos	1–0	1–1	1–1	3–1	1–0	1–2	0–1	1–1	0–1	2–0	2–2	3–0	—	1–1	0–1	1–1	2–0	2–1	2–2	0–3
Marbella	1–2	4–1	0–1	0–1	1–0	1–1	0–0	1–0	0–2	2–0	0–1	1–1	0–1	—	2–1	0–1	3–0	0–1	3–1	0–1
Murcia	2–1	0–2	2–3	2–1	0–1	1–2	1–2	3–0	3–1	3–2	1–1	0–2	1–0	1–1	—	0–1	1–1	1–0	0–0	1–1
Sabadell	0–0	3–1	0–1	2–0	2–0	1–3	0–0	0–0	4–0	0–0	1–0	2–0	2–2	5–0	2–2	—	1–0	0–0	0–0	1–0
Sevilla Atlético	1–1	0–2	1–1	1–1	2–1	1–0	0–0	2–2	0–1	1–2	2–0	1–2	1–1	1–0	0–1	1–2	—	0–1	0–1	0–0
Tarazona	2–0	2–2	1–0	1–4	0–2	1–0	0–0	1–2	0–0	2–0	2–2	0–0	0–0	0–0	1–0	0–2	2–0	—	3–2	2–1
Teruel	1–2	1–0	0–1	0–0	0–0	0–0	1–2	1–1	1–0	1–0	2–1	1–0	0–1	1–0	0–0	0–1	1–0	0–0	—	1–0
Villarreal B	1–0	4–0	1–1	1–3	2–0	4–1	1–0	2–0	3–3	0–0	1–0	0–0	2–2	3–1	1–1	1–1	2–0	1–1	1–2	—

Legend: Blue = home team win; Yellow = draw; Red = away team win.

=== Top scorers ===
As of 23 May 2026

Rank	Player	Club	Goals
1	(Spain) Arnau Ortiz	Atlético Madrileño	23
2	(Spain) Jordi Cano	Europa	22
3	(Spain) Jaume Jardí	Gimnàstic	11
3	(Spain) Dioni	Eldense	11
3	(Slovenia) David Flakus Bosilj	Real Murcia	11

== See also ==
- 2025–26 La Liga
- 2025–26 Segunda División
- 2025–26 Segunda Federación
- 2025–26 Tercera Federación
