= Cándido Gómez =

Spanish football manager (born 1957)

Personal information
- Full name: Cándido Gómez Vázquez
- Date of birth: 7 November 1957 (age 68)
- Place of birth: Punxín, Spain
- Position: Defender

Team information
- Current team: Ourense CF (youth manager)

Senior career*
Years	Team	Apps	(Gls)
- Atlético Ourense
- Galaico
1986–1989	Arenteiro	62	(0)
- Don Bosco (futsal)
- Renfe (futsal)
- Frank Chicos (futsal)

Managerial career
- 1998–2010: Pabellón Ourense (youth)
- Taboadela
- Velle
- Maside
- Salamonde
- 2001–2004: Ponte Ourense
- 2010–2011: CD Ourense (youth)
- 2011: CD Ourense
- 2011–2021: Pabellón Ourense (youth)
- 2021: Polígono San Cibrao
- 2023: Barco
- 2023–2026: Ourense CF (youth)
- 2026: Ourense CF
- 2026–: Ourense CF (youth)
- * Club domestic league appearances and goals

Cándido Gómez Vázquez (born 7 November 1957) is a Spanish retired footballer who played as a defender, and the current manager of Ourense CF's youth sides.

== Career ==
Born in Punxín, Ourense, Galicia, Gómez played for CA Ourense, Galaico CF and CD Arenteiro, the latter in Segunda División B. He also played futsal for Don Bosco FS, Renfe FS and Frank Chicos FS before focusing solely on coaching.

Mainly linked with Pabellón Ourense CF, Gómez was also in charge of lower league sides UD Taboadela, CD Velle, Maside FC, Salamonde FC. He also spent three years at the helm of Ponte Ourense CF in Tercera División, and was appointed manager of CD Ourense after a period in charge of their youth sides on 10 March 2011.

Gómez also worked in Ourense's Municipal Sports Council, and was in charge of Pabellón's Juvenil A squad during the 2020–21 División de Honor Juvenil. In July 2021, he took over Preferente de Galicia side ACD Polígono San Cibrao, but resigned on 14 October.

On 1 March 2023, Gómez was appointed manager of CD Barco in Tercera Federación along with José Antonio Rodríguez, but were sacked on 12 April. On 27 July 2023, he returned to Ponte, with the club now called Ourense CF, as the manager of their Juvenil team.

On 13 May 2026, Gómez replaced sacked Dani Llácer at the helm of the first team in Primera Federación. Despite remaining unbeaten in his two matches in charge, he was unable to prevent team relegation, and subsequently returned to his previous role.
