= David Movilla =

Spanish football manager

Personal information
- Full name: Luis David Movilla Madrid
- Date of birth: 9 February 1980 (age 46)
- Place of birth: Barakaldo, Spain
- Position: Goalkeeper

Youth career
- 1994–1995: Romo
- 1995–1998: Athletic Bilbao

Senior career*
Years	Team	Apps	(Gls)
1998–1999	Arenas Getxo		
1999	Leioa		

Managerial career
- 1999–2001: Romo (youth)
- 2001–2002: Peña Athletic Santurtzi (youth)
- 2002–2003: Arenas Getxo (youth)
- 2003–2006: Arenas Getxo
- 2006–2015: Leioa
- 2015–2017: Barakaldo
- 2018–2021: Zamora
- 2022–2023: Real Unión
- 2023–2024: Zamora
- 2025: Sabadell
- 2025–2026: Marbella
- * Club domestic league appearances and goals

Luis David Movilla Madrid (born 9 February 1980) is a Spanish football manager and former player who played as a goalkeeper.

== Career ==
Born in Barakaldo, Biscay, Basque Country, Movilla played as a goalkeeper for Romo CF and Athletic Bilbao's youth sides. He played as a senior for Arenas Club de Getxo in Tercera División, and spent the following pre-season with Sestao River Club before moving to SD Leioa and subsequently retiring from playing.

Movilla began his managerial career in charge of the Cadete squad of Romo in 1999, aged 19. After subsequently managing the youth sides of Peña Athletic Santurtzi CF and Arenas, he was named manager of the latter's first team in Tercera División in November 2003, at the age of 23.

Movilla was sacked from Arenas in January 2006, and was appointed manager of Leioa in May, with the club threatened with relegation in the División de Honor de Vizcaya. He led the club to promotion to the fourth tier in 2008 and a first-ever promotion to Segunda División B in 2014, before leaving on 10 June 2015.

On 11 June 2015, Movilla was named Barakaldo CF manager. On 14 March 2017, he was dismissed due to discrepancies with the club's board, and replaced by Gonzalo Arconada.

On 1 October 2018, after more than a year without coaching, Movilla was named at the helm of Zamora CF also in the third level. On 22 November 2021, he left the club on a mutual agreement, after having just two wins into the season.

On 5 December 2022, after another year of inactivity, Movilla was appointed in charge of Real Unión also in Primera Federación. The following 15 March, he was relieved from his duties after just 14 matches.

On 4 July 2023, Movilla returned to Zamora, with the club now in Segunda Federación. Roughly one year later, despite achieving promotion to division three, the club announced his departure.

On 20 January 2025, Movilla was announced as manager of CE Sabadell FC in the fourth division. Despite not winning any of his seven first games in charge (six in the league and one in Copa Catalunya), he guided the team to promotion to Primera Federación after nine wins, two draws and two defeats in the last thirteen matches of the season.

On 17 June 2025, Movilla left the Arlequinats.

On 11 November 2025, Movilla signed as manager of Marbella in the third tier. On 7 January 2026, Movilla was sacked by Marbella after losing five of the seven matches he oversaw; leaving the side in serious danger of relegation.

== Managerial statistics ==
As of 4 January 2026

Managerial record by team and tenure
Team	Nat	From	To	Record					Ref
Team	Nat	From	To	G	W	D	L	Win %	Ref
Arenas Getxo	(Spain)	11 November 2003	16 January 2006	84	30	26	28	35.71	
Leioa	(Spain)	30 May 2006	10 June 2015	343	144	99	100	41.98	
Barakaldo	(Spain)	11 June 2015	14 March 2017	75	38	20	17	50.67	
Zamora	(Spain)	1 October 2018	22 November 2021	108	65	21	22	60.19	
Real Unión	(Spain)	5 December 2022	15 March 2023	14	4	2	8	28.57	
Zamora	(Spain)	4 July 2023	2 July 2024	40	19	14	7	47.50	
Sabadell	(Spain)	20 January 2025	17 June 2025	20	9	5	6	45.00	
Marbella	(Spain)	11 November 2025	7 January 2026	7	1	1	5	14.29	
Total				691	310	188	193	44.86	—
