= Fernando Estévez =

Fernando Estévez may refer to:

- Fernando Estévez (football manager) (born 1979), Spanish football manager
- Fernando Estévez (sculptor), Spanish sculptor from the 18th century
