= 1948–49 Segunda División =

18th season of the second-tier football league in Spain

Segunda División
- Season: 1948–49
- Champions: Real Sociedad
- Promoted: Real Sociedad; Málaga
- Matches: 182
- Goals: 734 (4.03 per match)
- Top goalscorer: Pedro Bazán (26 goals)
- Best goalkeeper: Candi (1.16 goals/match)
- Biggest home win: Málaga 8–0 Murcia (12 September 1948)
- Biggest away win: Ferrol 1–5 Málaga (17 April 1949)
- Highest scoring: Real Sociedad 9–2 Hércules (12 December 1948)

The 1948–49 Segunda División season was the 18th since its establishment and was played between 11 September 1948 and 17 April 1949.

== Overview before the season ==
14 teams joined the league, including two relegated from the 1947–48 La Liga and two promoted from the 1947–48 Tercera División.

Relegated from La Liga

- Real Sociedad
- Real Gijón

Promoted from Tercera División

- Real Santander
- Gerona

== Teams ==
Location of teams in Segunda División 1948-49

Club	City	Stadium
CF Badalona	Badalona	Avenida de Navarra
Club Baracaldo	Baracaldo	Lasesarre
CD Castellón	Castellón de la Plana	Castalia
Gerona CF	Gerona	Vista Alegre
Real Gijón	Gijón	El Molinón
Club Ferrol	Ferrol	Inferniño
Granada CF	Granada	Los Cármenes
Hércules CF	Alicante	La Viña
Levante UD	Valencia	Vallejo
CD Málaga	Málaga	La Rosaleda
CD Mestalla	Valencia	Mestalla
Real Murcia	Murcia	Estadio de La Condomina
Real Sociedad	San Sebastián	Atocha
Real Santander SD	Santander	El Sardinero

== League table ==
Pos	Team	Pld	W	D	L	GF	GA	GD	Pts	Promotion or qualification
1	Real Sociedad (C, P)	26	17	1	8	80	41	+39	35 (Note: Real Sociedad finished ahead of Málaga and Granada on head-to-head goal difference)	Promotion to La Liga
2	Málaga (P)	26	15	5	6	73	33	+40	35	Promotion to La Liga
3	Granada	26	16	3	7	50	37	+13	35	
4	Hércules	26	14	4	8	64	53	+11	32	
5	Baracaldo	26	13	3	10	48	37	+11	29 (Note: Baracaldo finished ahead of Real Gijón on head-to-head points: Baracaldo–Real Gijón 1–0, Real Gijón–Baracaldo 0–0)	
6	Real Gijón	26	12	5	9	56	44	+12	29	
7	Murcia	26	12	2	12	51	71	−20	26	
8	Castellón	26	11	2	13	47	61	−14	24	
9	Levante	26	9	4	13	48	53	−5	22 (Note: Levante finished ahead of Gerona on overall goal difference)	
10	Gerona	26	10	2	14	45	53	−8	22	
11	Real Santander	26	8	5	13	50	67	−17	21	
12	Mestalla	26	9	2	15	43	50	−7	20	
13	Badalona	26	8	3	15	40	63	−23	19	Qualification for the relegation playoffs
14	Ferrol	26	6	3	17	39	71	−32	15	Qualification for the relegation playoffs

Source: BDFútbol
Rules for classification: 1) points; 2) head-to-head points; 3) head-to-head goal difference; 4) goal difference; 5) number of goals scored
(C) Champions; (P) Promoted

== Results ==
Home \ Away	BAD	BAR	CAS	GIR	GRA	HER	LEV	CDM	MES	MUR	RFE	RAC	SPO	RSO
Badalona	—	1–2	4–1	0–3	2–0	3–4	3–2	2–2	2–1	3–0	2–1	1–1	1–1	2–1
Baracaldo	3–1	—	6–1	3–0	5–1	3–0	2–1	3–2	6–2	3–0	2–0	2–3	1–0	1–2
Castellón	2–1	0–2	—	3–1	1–0	1–2	1–2	1–1	1–0	4–0	3–2	3–2	4–1	3–1
Gerona	5–0	0–0	2–3	—	0–1	2–0	5–1	2–2	2–1	2–1	4–1	4–0	4–2	4–1
Granada	4–2	3–1	1–0	3–0	—	1–1	3–0	1–0	4–2	5–1	3–0	3–0	1–0	3–0
Hércules	2–1	2–0	5–3	2–0	3–3	—	4–2	3–0	4–1	8–2	0–1	4–1	3–1	4–2
Levante	4–0	1–1	4–1	4–0	2–3	1–1	—	2–3	1–0	2–2	5–2	3–1	1–1	1–2
Málaga	6–1	3–0	1–0	4–2	5–0	1–0	5–0	—	1–1	8–0	6–2	7–1	3–0	3–1
Mestalla	3–2	2–0	3–1	3–1	1–2	1–1	1–0	0–1	—	2–0	6–1	4–2	2–3	1–3
Murcia	1–2	5–1	2–0	3–0	2–1	5–1	1–3	1–0	4–3	—	6–2	4–1	3–2	3–0
Ferrol	4–0	1–0	2–4	1–0	1–1	0–1	0–1	1–5	3–0	2–3	—	2–2	3–3	3–4
Real Santander	1–0	2–0	4–4	7–1	1–2	6–5	5–1	2–2	0–1	2–2	1–2	—	3–2	2–0
Real Gijón	5–3	0–0	5–2	2–0	2–0	3–2	2–1	2–1	3–2	7–0	6–1	3–0	—	0–0
Real Sociedad	4–1	4–1	7–0	5–1	5–1	9–2	4–3	5–1	2–0	7–0	3–1	5–0	3–0	—

Source: BDFútbol
Legend: Blue = home team win; Yellow = draw; Red = away team win.

== Top goalscorers ==
Goalscorers	Goals	Team
(Spain) Pedro Bazán	26	Málaga
(Spain) Juan Morales	24	Granada
(Spain) Calsita	24	Hércules
(Spain) José Caeiro	23	Real Sociedad
(Spain) Francisco Mamblona	23	Castellón

== Top goalkeepers ==
Goalkeeper	Goals	Matches	Average	Team
(Spain) Candi	22	19	1.16	Granada
(Spain) Cayetano Gana	34	25	1.36	Baracaldo
(Spain) José María Munárriz	21	15	1.4	Real Gijón
(Spain) Cesáreo López	30	20	1.5	Málaga
(Spain) Juan Bagur	41	26	1.58	Real Sociedad

== Relegation playoffs ==
=== Group 1 ===
==== League table ====
Pos	Team	Pld	W	D	L	GF	GA	GD	Pts	Promotion or relegation
1	Numancia (O, P)	6	4	0	2	14	17	−3	8	Promotion to Segunda División
2	Ferrol (Note: Remained after Segunda División expansion)	6	3	1	2	15	10	+5	7 (Note: Ferrol finished ahead of Lucense on head-to-head points: Ferrol–Lucense 3–0, Lucense–Ferrol 1–1)	
3	Lucense (Note: Promoted after Segunda División expansion) (P)	6	3	1	2	11	9	+2	7	
4	Erandio (Note: Promoted after Segunda División expansion) (P)	6	1	0	5	10	14	−4	2	

Source: BDFútbol
Rules for classification: 1) points; 2) head-to-head points; 3) head-to-head goal difference; 4) goal difference; 5) number of goals scored
(O) Play-off winners; (P) Promoted

==== Results ====
Home \ Away	ERA	LUC	NUM	RFE
Erandio	—	0–2	2–3	4–0
Lucense	2–1	—	5–1	1–1
Numancia	4–1	3–1	—	2–1
Ferrol	3–2	3–0	7–1	—

Source: BDFútbol
Legend: Blue = home team win; Yellow = draw; Red = away team win.

=== Group 2 ===
==== League table ====
Pos	Team	Pld	W	D	L	GF	GA	GD	Pts	Promotion or relegation
1	Linense (O, P)	6	3	1	2	13	11	+2	7	Promotion to Segunda División
2	Mallorca (Note: Promoted after Segunda División expansion) (P)	6	3	0	3	17	10	+7	6 (Note: Mallorca finished ahead of Badalona on overall goal difference)	
3	Badalona (Note: Remained after Segunda División expansion)	6	3	0	3	19	13	+6	6	
4	Cartagena (Note: Promoted after Segunda División expansion) (P)	6	2	1	3	11	26	−15	5	

Source: BDFútbol
Rules for classification: 1) points; 2) head-to-head points; 3) head-to-head goal difference; 4) goal difference; 5) number of goals scored
(O) Play-off winners; (P) Promoted

==== Results ====
Home \ Away	BAD	CAR	LNS	MAL
Badalona	—	5–1	4–0	5–2
Cartagena	4–3	—	2–2	3–2
Linense	3–2	6–1	—	2–0
Mallorca	3–0	8–0	2–0	—

Source: BDFútbol
Legend: Blue = home team win; Yellow = draw; Red = away team win.
