= Daniel Casas =

Spanish football manager (born 1994)

Personal information
- Full name: Daniel Casas Trillo
- Date of birth: 11 February 1979 (age 47)
- Place of birth: O Vicedo, Spain

Team information
- Current team: Sanluqueño (youth manager)

Managerial career
- Years: Team
- 2012–2014: La Salle PSM (youth)
- 2014–2019: Trasmallo (youth)
- 2019–2021: Sanluqueño (youth)
- 2023–2024: Cádiz B (assistant)
- 2025: Sanluqueño (youth)
- 2025–2026: Sanluqueño
- 2026–: Sanluqueño (youth)

Daniel Casas Trillo (born 11 February 1979), sometimes known as Daniel Gallego, is a Spanish football manager, currently in charge of the youth side at Atlético Sanluqueño CF.

== Career ==
Born in O Vicedo, Lugo, Galicia, Casas moved to the Province of Cádiz and began his career in charge of the youth sides of CD La Salle PSM in El Puerto de Santa María. He later worked for five years at Trasmallo FC, before being in charge of Atlético Sanluqueño CF's Alevín and Infantil teams.

In 2021, Casas joined the structure of Cádiz CF, as an assistant of the Juvenil A squad. On 15 July 2023, he was promoted to the reserves, as Alberto Cifuentes' assistant.

In August 2024, Casas moved to Cádiz's affiliate side Balón de Cádiz CF as an assistant, but moved abroad in the following month, after becoming a match analyst at Al-Mina'a SC in Iraq. In March 2025, he returned to Spain and Sanluqueño, after taking over their Cadete squad.

Casas started the 2025–26 season as manager of the Juvenil squad of the Verdiblancos, before being appointed manager of the main squad in Primera Federación on 30 December 2025, replacing José Herrera. On his managerial debut five days later, his side lost 2–0 to Real Murcia CF at home.

On 14 January 2026, after just two matches in charge albeit with two losses, Casas returned to his previous role in the youth setup at Sanluqueño. He was replaced by Pedro Mateos.

== Managerial statistics ==
As of 11 January 2026

Managerial record by team and tenure
Team	Nat	From	To	Record								Ref
Team	Nat	From	To	G	W	D	L	GF	GA	GD	Win %	Ref
Sanluqueño	(Spain)	30 December 2025	14 January 2026	2	0	0	2	0	3	−3	0.00	
Total				2	0	0	2	0	3	−3	0.00	—
