= Víctor Mingo =

Spanish footballer (born 2003)

Personal information
- Full name: Víctor García Mingo
- Date of birth: 25 July 2003 (age 23)
- Place of birth: Madrid, Spain
- Height: 1.88 m (6 ft 2 in)
- Position: Striker

Team information
- Current team: Oviedo
- Number: 18

Youth career
- Sporting Hortaleza
- 2019–2022: Getafe

Senior career*
| Years | Team | Apps | (Gls) |
| 2021–2022 | Getafe B | 9 | (1) |
| 2022–2024 | Illescas | 56 | (25) |
| 2024–2025 | Espanyol B | 33 | (6) |
| 2025–2026 | Arenteiro | 32 | (12) |
| 2026– | Oviedo | 1 | (0) |
- * Club domestic league appearances and goals as of 15 August 2026

Víctor García Mingo (born 25 July 2003) is a Spanish professional footballer who plays as a striker for Real Oviedo.

== Career ==
Born in Madrid, Mingo finished his formation with Getafe CF, and made his senior debut with the reserves in the 2021–22 season, in Tercera División RFEF. On 12 July 2022, he signed for fellow fifth division side CD Illescas, immediately becoming a starter and scoring four goals in a 5–1 routing of CD Marchamalo the following January.

On 16 July 2024, after two seasons as the club's top scorer, Mingo agreed to a two-year contract with RCD Espanyol, being initially assigned to the reserves in Segunda Federación. On 28 July of the following year, he moved to Primera Federación side CD Arenteiro.

On 7 July 2026, after being the Galicians' top scorer with 12 goals as the club suffered relegation, Mingo joined Real Oviedo of the Segunda División on a two-year deal. He made his professional debut on 15 August, coming on as a late substitute for Jacobo González in a 0–0 home draw against Granada CF.
