= Marco García =

Marco García may refer to:

- Marco García (Mexican footballer) (born 2000), Mexican football midfielder
- Marco García (Spanish footballer) (born 1978), Spanish football manager and former midfielder
