= Javi Medina =

Spanish football manager (born 1994)

Personal information
- Full name: Javier Medina Morales
- Date of birth: 31 January 1994 (age 32)
- Place of birth: El Garrobo, Spain

Team information
- Current team: Unionistas (manager)

Managerial career
- Years: Team
- 2018–2019: Gerena (assistant)
- 2019–2022: Betis B (assistant)
- 2022–2023: Antequera (assistant)
- 2023–2025: Antequera
- 2025: Betis B
- 2026–: Unionistas

Javier "Javi" Medina Morales (born 31 January 1994) is a Spanish football manager, currently in charge of Unionistas de Salamanca CF.

== Career ==
Born in El Garrobo, Seville, Andalusia, Medina worked as a coach at CMD San Juan, UD Pilas and CD Gerena before joining Manuel Ruano's staff at Betis Deportivo Balompié initially as a technical assistant; he later became an assistant after Pablo del Pino became a manager of the B's. He left the latter in 2022, and became an assistant of Abel Segovia at Antequera CF in July of that year.

On 6 June 2023, after Segovia failed to agree new terms with the club, Medina was named manager of Antequera in Primera Federación; aged 29, he became the youngest manager in the top three divisions of Spanish football. He made his senior debut as a manager on 26 August, in a 2–0 away loss to Atlético Madrid B.

On 28 December 2023, Medina renewed his contract with Antequera until 2025. He left the club on 12 June 2025, after missing out promotion in the play-offs, and returned to Betis and their B-team four days later, now as manager.

On 26 December 2025, Medina was sacked as Betis Deportivo manager, with the side sitting rock bottom of their group with only two wins from 17 league matches. The following 9 June, he replaced Mario Simón at the helm of Unionistas de Salamanca CF, also in the third division.

== Managerial statistics ==
As of 20 December 2025

Managerial record by team and tenure
Team	Nat	From	To	Record								Ref
Team	Nat	From	To	G	W	D	L	GF	GA	GD	Win %	Ref
Antequera	(Spain)	6 June 2023	12 June 2025	80	32	24	24	106	101	+5	40.00	
Betis B	(Spain)	16 June 2025	26 December 2025	17	2	5	10	11	24	−13	11.76	
Total				97	34	29	34	117	125	−8	35.05	—
