= Alejandro Ortiz =

Alejandro Ortiz may refer to:

- Alejandro Ortiz (basketball) (born 1952), Cuban basketball player
- Alejandro Ortíz (footballer) (born 1958), Guatemalan football midfielder
- Álex Ortiz (football manager) (born 1987), Spanish football manager
- Álex Ortiz (footballer) (born 1985), Spanish football centre-back
