= Javier Vázquez =

Javier Vázquez may refer to:

- Javier Vazquez (fighter) (born 1976), Cuban mixed martial artist
- Javier Vázquez (baseball) (born 1976), Puerto Rican baseball player
- Javier Vázquez (musician), Afro-Cuban songwriter, arranger, and pianist with Sonora Matancera
- Javi Vázquez (footballer, born 1986), Spanish football manager and former player
- Javi Vázquez (footballer, born 2000), Spanish footballer

== See also ==
- Jorge Javier Vázquez (born 1970), Spanish TV host
