= Jorge Cuesta =

Jorge Cuesta may refer to:

- Jorge Cuesta (poet)
- Jorge Cuesta (football manager)
