= Jorge Cuesta (football manager) =

Spanish football manager (born 1984)

Personal information
- Full name: Jorge Cuesta Bello
- Date of birth: 7 December 1984 (age 41)
- Place of birth: Vigo, Spain

Team information
- Current team: Ourense (manager)

Managerial career
- Years: Team
- 2009–2021: Celta (youth)
- 2021–2023: Wuhan Three Towns (youth)
- 2023–2024: Sarriana
- 2024–2025: Bergantiños
- 2025–2026: Arenteiro
- 2026–: Ourense

Jorge Cuesta Bello (born 7 December 1984) is a Spanish football manager, currently in charge of Ourense CF.

== Career ==
Born in Vigo, Galicia, Cuesta began his career as a fitness coach at Pontevedra CF before joining the youth sides of RC Celta de Vigo in 2009, as a manager of the Alevín squad. He later progressed through the youth categories, taking over the Cadete B, Cadete A and Juvenil B teams before being named at the helm of the Juvenil A in June 2017.

On 18 June 2021, Cuesta left Celta after a 12-year spell at the club, and moved to China shortly after, taking over Wuhan Three Towns FC's under-19 side. He returned to his home country on 16 June 2023, taking over Tercera Federación newcomers SD Sarriana.

Cuesta narrowly missed out promotion in the play-offs with Sarriana, and was named at the helm of Segunda Federación side Bergantiños FC on 6 June 2024. He finished the campaign in the eighth position, but left on 5 June 2025 after failing to agree new terms.

On 17 November 2025, Cuesta was appointed manager of Primera Federación side CD Arenteiro. The following 2 March, he was dismissed after three consecutive losses.

On 9 June 2026, Cuesta took over Ourense CF, freshly relegated to division four.

== Managerial statistics ==
As of 28 February 2026

Managerial record by team and tenure
Team	Nat	From	To	Record								Ref
Team	Nat	From	To	G	W	D	L	GF	GA	GD	Win %	Ref
Sarriana	(Spain)	16 June 2023	6 June 2024	36	14	9	13	44	39	+5	38.89	
Bergantiños	(Spain)	6 June 2024	5 June 2025	35	13	8	14	51	49	+2	37.14	
Arenteiro	(Spain)	17 November 2025	2 March 2026	14	4	2	8	15	20	−5	28.57	
Career total				85	31	19	35	110	108	+2	36.47	—
