= David Cabello =

Spanish football manager (born 1977)

Personal information
- Full name: José David Cabello García
- Date of birth: 9 September 1977 (age 49)
- Place of birth: Remscheid, Germany
- Height: 1.75 m (5 ft 9 in)
- Position: Forward

Youth career
- 1990–1992: Málaga
- 1992–1996: Barcelona

Senior career*
Years	Team	Apps	(Gls)
1996–1997	Barcelona C	24	(14)
1997–1998	Numancia	0	(0)
1998	Isla Cristina	19	(4)
1998–1999	Poli Almería	34	(11)
1999–2000	Xerez	26	(3)
2000–2002	Algeciras	63	(14)
2002–2003	Ceuta	22	(6)
2003–2004	Gramenet	13	(0)
2004–2005	Badajoz	30	(11)
2005–2006	Extremadura	32	(7)
2006–2007	Melilla	34	(13)
2007–2010	Lucena	106	(35)
2010–2011	Unión Estepona	28	(4)
2011–2012	Sporting Villanueva	15	(4)
2012	Burgos	13	(1)
Total		459	(127)

International career
1994	Spain U16		(1)

Managerial career
- 2014–2018: Málaga (youth)
- 2019–2020: El Ejido
- 2020: Cultural Leonesa
- 2022–2023: El Ejido
- 2024–2025: Melilla
- 2026: Marbella
- * Club domestic league appearances and goals

José David Cabello García (born 9 September 1977) is a Spanish retired footballer who played as a forward, and is a current manager.

== Playing career ==
Born in Remscheid, Germany but raised in Málaga, Andalusia, Cabello played for the youth sides of Málaga CF and FC Barcelona, making his senior debut with the latter's C-team in the 1996–97 Tercera División. He moved straight to Segunda División with CD Numancia in 1997, but left in January of the following year after making no appearances, to join CD Isla Cristina in Segunda División.

Cabello would resume his career in the third division, playing for CP Almería, Xerez CD, Algeciras CF, AD Ceuta, UDA Gramenet, CD Badajoz, CF Extremadura, UD Melilla, Lucena CF, Unión Estepona CF, Sporting Villanueva Promesas and Burgos CF. He retired with the latter in 2012, aged 34, after suffering an injury and being relegated.

== Managerial career ==
In 2014, Cabello returned to his first club Málaga as a manager of the Juvenil B team. He was later in charge of the club's Cadete and Juvenil teams, before signing for Deportivo Alavés on 4 August 2018 as a Methodology Director.

On 24 May 2019, Cabello was named manager of fourth division side CD El Ejido. After leading the club back to the third tier, he left the club in August 2020 after failing to agree new terms, and took over Cultural y Deportiva Leonesa of the same category shortly after.

Cabello was sacked by Cultu on 1 December 2020, and spent more than a year without a club before returning to El Ejido on 7 June 2022, with the club now named CP El Ejido 1969. He left after their relegation from Segunda Federación, and was again unemployed for a long period before being named at the helm of UD Melilla on 15 October 2024.

Dismissed on 16 March 2025, Cabello was appointed manager of Primera Federación side Marbella FC on 7 January 2026. On 10 June, after suffering relegation, he left.

== Managerial statistics ==
As of 10 June 2026

Managerial record by team and tenure
Team	Nat	From	To	Record								Ref
Team	Nat	From	To	G	W	D	L	GF	GA	GD	Win %	Ref
El Ejido	(Spain)	24 May 2019	3 August 2020	31	18	7	6	52	31	+21	58.06	
Cultural Leonesa	(Spain)	15 August 2020	1 December 2020	6	2	3	1	8	6	+2	33.33	
El Ejido	(Spain)	7 June 2022	30 June 2023	34	11	6	17	34	41	−7	32.35	
Melilla	(Spain)	15 October 2024	16 March 2025	20	7	6	7	25	22	+3	35.00	
Marbella	(Spain)	7 January 2026	10 June 2026	20	6	1	13	25	36	−11	30.00	
Total				111	44	23	44	144	136	+8	39.64	—
