= Marco García (Spanish footballer) =

Spanish football manager (born 1978)

Personal information
- Full name: Marco Antonio García Ruiz
- Date of birth: 14 August 1978 (age 48)
- Place of birth: Dos Hermanas, Spain
- Height: 1.81 m (5 ft 11 in)
- Position: Midfielder

Team information
- Current team: Sevilla C (manager)

Youth career
- Sevilla
- 1995–1996: → Utrera (loan)

Senior career*
Years	Team	Apps	(Gls)
1995–2002	Sevilla B	94	(6)
1995–1996	→ Utrera (loan)	6	(0)
1997–1998	→ Jerez (loan)	19	(6)
1998–1999	→ Burguillos (loan)	31	(1)
2000	Sevilla	1	(0)
2002–2005	Extremadura	101	(12)
2005–2007	Cartagena	38	(8)
2007–2008	Ponferradina	33	(2)
2008–2009	San Fernando	36	(4)
2009–2011	Alcalá	39	(2)
2012–2015	PD Rociera		
Total		412	(41)

Managerial career
- 2018–2021: Sevilla C (assistant)
- 2021–2026: Sevilla (youth)
- 2026: Sevilla B
- 2026–: Sevilla C
- * Club domestic league appearances and goals

Marco Antonio García Ruiz (born 14 August 1978) is a Spanish retired footballer who played as a midfielder, and is the current manager of Sevilla FC C.

== Playing career ==
Born in Dos Hermanas, Seville, Andalusia, he played for Sevilla FC as a youth. Known as just Marco as a player, he made his senior debut while on loan at Segunda División B side CD Utrera during the 1995–96 season, aged 17.

Back to Sevilla in 1996, Marco played one more year with the youth sides before moving to Tercera División sides Jerez CF and CD Burguillos also on loan. Upon returning in 1999, he was assigned to the reserves in the third division before making his first team – and La Liga – debut on 19 May 2000, coming on as a half-time substitute for Marcelo Zalayeta in a 3–2 home loss to Rayo Vallecano, as the club was already relegated.

In 2002, Marco left the Nervionenses and signed for CF Extremadura in division three. In 2005, after three seasons as a regular starter, he agreed to a deal with fellow league team FC Cartagena.

On 6 July 2007, Marco was announced at SD Ponferradina, also in the third tier. He subsequently played for CD San Fernando and CD Utrera, suffering relegation with both sides.

In 2012, after one year without a club, Marco moved to Primera Andaluza side Peña Deportiva Rociera, and helped in their promotion to the fourth division in 2014. In June of the following year, aged 36, he retired.

== Managerial career ==
After retiring, García returned to his first club Sevilla in 2018, as an assistant of the C-team. He continued to work as an assistant of the Juvenil A squad in the following years before taking over the Juvenil B team in 2024.

In June 2025, García was named manager of the Cadete A squad. On 9 March of the following year, he was appointed in charge of a B-side severely threatened with relegation in Primera Federación, replacing sacked Luci.

== Managerial statistics ==
As of 19 April 2026

Managerial record by team and tenure
Team	Nat	From	To	Record								Ref
Team	Nat	From	To	G	W	D	L	GF	GA	GD	Win %	Ref
Sevilla B	(Spain)	9 March 2026	Present	6	1	2	3	3	7	−4	16.67	
Total				6	1	2	3	3	7	−4	16.67	—
