= Pablo López (footballer, born 1977) =

Spanish football manager (born 1990)

Personal information
- Full name: Pablo López Vidal
- Date of birth: 21 September 1977 (age 49)
- Place of birth: A Coruña, Spain
- Height: 1.77 m (5 ft 10 in)
- Position: Centre-back

Youth career
- Orillamar
- 1993–1996: Deportivo La Coruña

Senior career*
Years	Team	Apps	(Gls)
1996–1997	Imperátor		
1997–1999	Pontevedra	31	(0)
1999–2003	Celta B	135	(3)
2003–2006	Ourense	103	(3)
2006–2007	Oviedo	28	(1)
2007–2008	Cultural Leonesa	18	(2)
2008–2009	Ciudad Santiago	28	(1)
2009–2012	Montañeros	76	(1)
2012–2014	As Pontes	49	(3)
Total		468	(14)

Managerial career
- 2014–2015: As Pontes (youth)
- 2015–2016: As Pontes
- 2016–2018: Deportivo La Coruña (youth)
- 2018: Deportivo La Coruña (assistant)
- 2018–2019: Cameroon (assistant)
- 2020–2023: Racing Ferrol (assistant)
- 2024–2025: Ourense
- 2025–2026: Racing Ferrol
- * Club domestic league appearances and goals

Pablo López Vidal (born 21 September 1977) is a Spanish retired footballer who played mainly as a centre-back, and is a current manager.

== Playing career ==
Born in A Coruña, Galicia, López represented Orillamar SD and Deportivo de La Coruña as a youth, but made his senior debut with Imperátor OAR in the 1996–97 season, achieving promotion to Tercera División. In 1997, he moved straight to Segunda División B, after signing with Pontevedra CF.

In 1999, López joined RC Celta de Vigo and was assigned to the reserves in the fourth division. He helped the side to a promotion to the third level in 2001, and moved to CD Ourense in that category in 2003.

On 25 June 2006, López agreed to a contract with Real Oviedo also in division three. On 23 July of the following year, after suffering relegation, he signed for Cultural y Deportiva Leonesa.

On 8 July 2008, López was presented at SD Ciudad de Santiago still in the third level, but moved to fellow league team Montañeros CF on 15 August of the following year. In 2012, he joined fourth division side CD As Pontes, and retired with the club in July 2014, aged 37; he immediately became their sporting director.

== Managerial career ==
On 11 June 2015, López was named manager of As Pontes. He left the club in June 2016 to join Deportivo de La Coruña as the manager of the Juvenil B squad, before becoming an assistant of Clarence Seedorf in the main squad in February 2018.

López followed Seedorf to the Cameroon national team also as his assistant in September 2018, before joining Emilio Larraz's staff at Racing de Ferrol in July 2020, under the same role. He was also an analyst at the latter side during the 2023–24 season before departing the club.

On 5 November 2024, López was appointed manager of Primera Federación side Ourense CF. He left the club the following 4 June to return to Racing, being named manager of the side freshly relegated to division three.

On 7 January 2026, López was sacked by Racing after a poor string of results.

== Managerial statistics ==
As of match played 3 January 2026

Managerial record by team and tenure
Team	Nat	From	To	Record								Ref
Team	Nat	From	To	G	W	D	L	GF	GA	GD	Win %	Ref
As Pontes	(Spain)	11 June 2015	27 June 2016	38	13	10	15	49	54	−5	34.21	
Ourense	(Spain)	5 November 2024	4 June 2025	30	14	8	8	33	32	+1	46.67	
Racing Ferrol	(Spain)	4 June 2025	7 January 2026	20	9	4	7	24	22	+2	45.00	
Career total				88	36	22	30	106	108	−2	40.91	—
