= Álex Ortiz (football manager) =

Spanish football manager

Personal information
- Full name: Alejandro Jesús Ortiz Cabrera
- Date of birth: 1 October 1987 (age 39)
- Place of birth: Málaga, Spain

Managerial career
- Years: Team
- 2006–2009: Lauro (youth)
- 2009–2011: Alhaurín Torre (youth)
- 2011–2012: Alhaurín Torre B
- 2012: Alhaurín Torre
- 2013–2014: Puerto Malagueño (youth)
- 2014–2015: Alhaurín Torre (assistant)
- 2015: San Félix (youth)
- 2015–2016: San Pedro
- 2016–2019: Málaga (youth)
- 2020–2022: Polvorín
- 2022: Vélez
- 2023: Rincón
- 2024–2025: Villarreal (youth)
- 2025: Polvorín
- 2025: Lugo
- 2026: Lugo (caretaker)

Alejandro Jesús "Álex" Ortiz Cabrera (born 1 October 1987) is a Spanish football manager.

== Career ==
Born in Málaga, Andalusia, Ortiz began his career with Alhaurín de la Torre-based side CD Lauro in 2006, aged 18. In 2009, he moved to Alhaurín de la Torre CF, being in charge of the youth and reserve sides before taking over the first team in Tercera División in July 2012.

Ortiz was sacked by Alhaurín on 1 October 2012, and subsequently worked as a manager of the Juvenil squad of CD Puerto Malagueño before returning to the club in December 2014, as an assistant of Lalo Pavón. On 3 September 2015, after a short period as an assistant of Adrián Cervera at CD San Félix, he was appointed manager of fourth division side UD San Pedro.

Ortiz left San Pedro on 3 June 2016, and joined Málaga CF as a manager of the Infantil squad shortly after. He left the latter in 2019 to move to Romania, where he worked as the Head of Methodology at FC Viitorul Constanța.

On 18 August 2020, Ortiz returned to his home country after being named manager of CD Lugo's farm team Polvorín FC. He renewed his contract the following 26 June, and led the club to a promotion to Segunda Federación at the end of the season.

Despite achieving promotion, Ortiz left Lugo on 7 June 2022, and took over Vélez CF also in the fourth division four days later. On 30 November, he was dismissed after 12 matches.

On 1 June 2023, Ortiz was announced as manager of Tercera Federación side CD Rincón. On 6 November, after nine winless rounds, he was dismissed.

In 2024, Ortiz joined the structure of Villarreal CF as a manager of the Cadete A squad, before returning to Lugo on 27 February 2025, again as manager of the B-side. On 5 May, following the sacking of Toni Seligrat, he was named manager of the first team for the remaining three matches of the 2024–25 Primera Federación.

After avoiding relegation, Ortiz became a youth coordinator at the Albivermellos before returning to managerial duties on 22 March 2026, replacing sacked Yago Iglesias on a caretaker basis. His spell ended in May, as the club ended the campaign five points shy of the play-offs.

== Managerial statistics ==
As of 23 May 2026

Managerial record by team and tenure
Team	Nat	From	To	Record								Ref
Team	Nat	From	To	G	W	D	L	GF	GA	GD	Win %	Ref
Alhaurín Torre B	(Spain)	1 July 2011	30 June 2012	30	21	3	6	74	29	+45	70.00	
Alhaurín Torre	(Spain)	1 July 2012	1 October 2012	6	0	2	4	2	11	−9	0.00	
San Pedro	(Spain)	3 September 2015	3 June 2016	36	13	6	17	51	62	−11	36.11	
Polvorín	(Spain)	18 August 2020	7 June 2022	61	35	14	12	94	47	+47	57.38	
Vélez	(Spain)	11 June 2022	30 November 2022	12	5	2	5	13	13	+0	41.67	
Rincón	(Spain)	1 June 2023	6 November 2023	9	0	5	4	6	12	−6	0.00	
Polvorín	(Spain)	27 February 2025	5 May 2025	11	4	2	5	13	16	−3	36.36	
Lugo	(Spain)	5 May 2025	18 June 2025	3	1	1	1	4	3	+1	33.33	
Lugo (caretaker)	(Spain)	22 March 2026	28 May 2026	9	3	2	4	8	12	−4	33.33	
Career total				177	82	37	58	265	205	+60	46.33	—
