= Dani Vidal (football manager) =

Spanish football manager

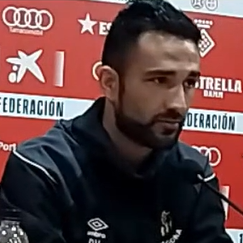
- Vidal in 2023

Personal information
- Full name: Daniel Vidal González
- Date of birth: 14 June 1992 (age 34)
- Place of birth: Tarragona, Spain

Youth career
- Years: Team
- 2005–2013: Gimnàstic

Managerial career
- 2013–2017: Gimnàstic (youth)
- 2017–2018: Pobla Mafumet (assistant)
- 2018–2020: Gimnàstic (youth)
- 2020–2021: Pobla Mafumet
- 2021–2023: Gimnàstic (assistant)
- 2023–2025: Gimnàstic
- 2025–2026: Avilés Industrial

Daniel "Dani" Vidal González (born 14 June 1992) is a Spanish football manager.

== Career ==
Born in Tarragona, Catalonia, Vidal played for hometown side Gimnàstic de Tarragona as a youth before retiring at the age of 20, and immediately starting to coach the club's Infantil B squad. He then progressed through the club's youth categories, before being named an assistant of Juan Manuel Pavón at the farm team CF Pobla de Mafumet on 25 October 2017.

Vidal returned to the structure of Nàstic for the 2018–19 season, being named manager of the Juvenil B squad. On 15 December 2020, after being in charge of the Juvenil A team, he was appointed at the helm of Pobla.

On 16 June 2021, Vidal was named Raül Agné's assistant in the first team of Gimnàstic. On 27 February 2023, he was appointed manager of the club after the dismissal of Iñaki Alonso, and became the first manager of the club's history to manage them in all categories (youth, reserve and senior).

Vidal made his debut as manager of Nàstic on 5 March 2023, in a 1–0 Primera Federación home win over Real Sociedad B which ended the club's four-match winless run. On 9 June, after six wins and four draws in 13 matches, he renewed his contract with the club for a further two years.

On 11 May 2025, Vidal was sacked from his position as manager. He left the club after 14 seasons in all categories, with 94 official matches in charge of the main squad.

On 18 August 2025, Vidal was appointed manager of third division newcomers Real Avilés Industrial CF. He was sacked the following 23 March, after a nine-match winless run which had seen the side slip just two points above the relegation zone.

== Managerial statistics ==
As of 22 March 2026

Managerial record by team and tenure
| Team | Nat | From | To | Record | | | | | | | | Ref |
| Team | Nat | From | To | G | W | D | L | GF | GA | GD | Win % | Ref |
|---|---|---|---|---|---|---|---|---|---|---|---|---|
| Pobla de Mafumet | (Spain) | 15 December 2020 | 16 June 2021 | 23 | 10 | 9 | 4 | 39 | 23 | +16 | 43.48 | |
| Gimnàstic | (Spain) | 27 February 2023 | 11 May 2025 | 94 | 43 | 27 | 24 | 118 | 82 | +36 | 45.74 | |
| Avilés Industrial | (Spain) | 17 August 2025 | 23 March 2026 | 30 | 9 | 7 | 14 | 41 | 50 | −9 | 30.00 | |
| Career total | | | | 147 | 62 | 43 | 42 | 198 | 155 | +43 | 42.18 | — |
