= Vicente Parras =

Spanish football manager (born 1975)

Personal information
- Full name: Vicente Parras Campello
- Date of birth: 18 November 1975 (age 50)
- Place of birth: Alicante, Spain
- Position: Centre back

Managerial career
- Years: Team
- 1991–1996: Caja de Elche (youth)
- 2006–2008: Torrellano (youth)
- 2008–2009: Hércules (youth)
- 2009–2010: Torrellano Illice (youth)
- 2010–2012: Elche (youth)
- 2012–2015: Elche B (assistant)
- 2015–2017: Elche B
- 2017: Elche
- 2017–2018: Ontinyent
- 2018–2019: Ontinyent
- 2019–2024: Alcoyano
- 2025–2026: Teruel

Vicente Parras Campello (born 18 November 1975) is a Spanish retired footballer who played as a central defender, and is a manager.

== Coaching career ==
Born in Alicante but raised in Elche, also in the Valencian Community, Parras only played football at regional level. He started his managerial career at the age of just 16, coaching ACD Caja de Elche's youth sides.

Parras joined Elche CF in 2010, after stints at Torrellano CF, Hércules CF and Torrellano Illice CF. In 2012, he was named Vicente Mir's assistant at Elche CF Ilicitano, a position he retained for three years.

On 13 August 2015, following a short spell as an interim after Óscar Cano's resignation, Parras was named manager of the reserves. On 29 April 2017, he was promoted to the first team in place of the fired Alberto Toril.

Parras' first professional match occurred on 6 May 2017, a 0–1 Segunda División away loss against RCD Mallorca. Subsequently, he had two separate spells in Segunda División B with neighbouring Ontinyent CF, leaving in March 2019 after the club's dissolution.

In June 2019, Parras was hired by CD Alcoyano in the Tercera División. He won all ten of his first fixtures, equalling a record in the history of Group VI of the league, and subsequently led the club to two consecutive promotions to Primera Federación.

On 14 November 2024, Parras was sacked by Alcoyano after more than five years in charge. The following 12 June, he took over CD Teruel also in the third division, and led the club to a 12th place finish before departing on 6 June 2026.

== Managerial statistics ==
As of 19 April 2026

Managerial record by team and tenure
| Team | Nat | From | To | Record | | | | | | | | Ref |
| Team | Nat | From | To | G | W | D | L | GF | GA | GD | Win % | Ref |
|---|---|---|---|---|---|---|---|---|---|---|---|---|
| Elche B | (Spain) | 7 August 2015 | 29 April 2017 | 87 | 44 | 20 | 23 | 133 | 85 | +48 | 50.57 | |
| Elche | (Spain) | 29 April 2017 | 15 June 2017 | 6 | 0 | 1 | 5 | 2 | 9 | −7 | 0.00 | |
| Ontinyent | (Spain) | 26 July 2017 | 14 June 2018 | 53 | 23 | 14 | 16 | 53 | 47 | +6 | 43.40 | |
| Ontinyent | (Spain) | 6 November 2018 | 24 March 2019 | 19 | 4 | 7 | 8 | 14 | 23 | −9 | 21.05 | |
| Alcoyano | (Spain) | 17 June 2019 | 14 November 2024 | 191 | 75 | 58 | 58 | 228 | 194 | +34 | 39.27 | |
| Teruel | (Spain) | 11 June 2025 | Present | 34 | 12 | 11 | 11 | 26 | 28 | −2 | 35.29 | |
| Total | | | | 390 | 158 | 111 | 121 | 456 | 386 | +70 | 40.51 | — |
