= Iker Punzano =

Spanish footballer (born 2004)

Personal information
- Full name: Iker Punzano García
- Date of birth: 29 July 2004 (age 22)
- Place of birth: Onda, Spain
- Height: 1.86 m (6 ft 1 in)
- Position: Midfielder

Team information
- Current team: Ourense (on loan from Villarreal B)
- Number: 23

Youth career
- CD. Onda
- 2015–2020: Villarreal
- 2020–2022: Levante
- 2022–2023: Castellón

Senior career*
Years	Team	Apps	(Gls)
2023–2025	Castellón B	49	(8)
2023–2025	Castellón	4	(0)
2025–	Villarreal B	0	(0)
2025–	→ Ourense (loan)	24	(1)
- * Club domestic league appearances and goals as of 10 June 2026

Iker Punzano García (born 29 July 2004) is a Spanish professional footballer who plays as a midfielder for Primera Federación club Ourense on loan from Villarreal CF B.

== Career ==
Punzano was born in Onda, Castellón, Valencian Community, and represented Benicarló FB, Villarreal CF and Levante UD before joining CD Castellón's youth sides in 2022. He made his senior debut with the reserves on 24 September 2023, coming on as a half-time substitute in a 1–0 Tercera Federación home loss to CD Roda.

Punzano scored his first senior goal on 1 October 2023, netting the B's second in a 4–2 away loss to CD Acero. He made his first team debut late in the month, starting in a 3–2 win at CP Cacereño, for the season's Copa del Rey.

Punzano played in four Primera Federación matches during the campaign as Castellón achieved promotion, his first match being a 1–0 home win over UD Melilla on 28 April 2024. He made his professional debut on 22 December, replacing Brian Cipenga in a 2–0 Segunda División home loss to Elche CF.

On 19 June 2025, Punzano returned to Villarreal and was assigned to the B-team in Primera Federación.
