= Guillermo Fernández Romo =

Spanish football manager

Personal information
- Full name: Guillermo Fernández Romo
- Date of birth: 23 November 1978 (age 47)
- Place of birth: Madrid, Spain

Managerial career
- Years: Team
- 1998–1999: Villaverde Boetticher (youth)
- 1999–2000: Colonia Moscardó (youth)
- 2000: Pozuelo de Alarcón (youth)
- 2000–2001: Racing Garvin
- 2001–2002: Aviación (youth)
- 2002–2003: Móstoles (youth)
- 2003–2004: Moratalaz
- 2005–2006: Las Rozas
- 2006–2007: Rayo Majadahonda (youth)
- 2007–2008: Pontevedra (youth)
- 2008: Pontevedra B (assistant)
- 2008–2010: Celta (youth)
- 2010–2011: Noja
- 2011–2012: Melilla (assistant)
- 2012: Villalonga
- 2012–2014: Betis B (assistant)
- 2014–2015: Alcoyano (assistant)
- 2015–2016: Olímpic Xàtiva
- 2017: Sabadell
- 2018: Jumilla
- 2018–2019: Ejea
- 2019–2021: Cornellà
- 2021–2022: Racing Santander
- 2023–2024: Ibiza
- 2025: Cartagena
- 2026: Racing Ferrol
- 2026–: Krasava

Guillermo Fernández Romo (born 23 November 1978) is a Spanish football manager, currently in charge of Cypriot club Krasava.

== Career ==
Born in Madrid, Fernández Romo started his career working as a football teacher at Aluche in 1997. He then became a youth coach at Villaverde Boetticher the following year, and subsequently worked with several youth sides. He had his first senior experience at the helm of Racing Garvin in the regional leagues.

In 2005, after working as a scout at Vecindario, Fernández Romo was named as manager of Tercera División side Las Rozas. He later returned to youth sides, notably managing the Juvenil sides of Pontevedra (being also an assistant of the reserves for a brief period) and Celta before being appointed as manager of Noja in 2010.

In 2011, Fernández Romo joined Óscar Cano's staff at Melilla as his assistant. He left the side after Cano's departure in June 2012, being later named as manager of Villalonga; in December 2012, he opted to leave the latter side to rejoin Cano's staff at Real Betis B, and was also with the manager at Alcoyano.

Fernández Romo returned to managerial duties in July 2015, at the helm of Segunda División B side Olímpic Xàtiva. He was sacked on 7 February 2016, he became the technical secretary of Real Murcia on 8 June.

On 26 January 2017, Fernández Romo was presented as the new manager of Sabadell also in the third division. He left in June, and joined Jumilla in July as a sporting director. He became the latter's manager in April 2018, and managed to avoid relegation by winning four of the five remaining matches of the season.

On 22 May 2018, Fernández Romo was hired by Racing Santander to become the club's youth coordinator, but moved to Ejea on 13 August after being named manager of the side. He opted to leave on 10 June 2019, after being named in charge of Cornellà.

On 19 May 2021, Fernández Romo left Cornellà and immediately returned to Racing, now being named first team manager in the Primera División RFEF. He led the latter club to a Segunda División return after a two-year absence in his first season, with four matches to go.

On 12 December 2022, following a run of five defeats in a row, Fernández Romo was sacked by Racing. The following 6 June, he was appointed as manager of Ibiza, freshly relegated to the third tier, but was also dismissed from the latter on 29 April 2024.

On 14 January 2025, Fernández Romo was named Cartagena's third manager of the season. He departed the club on 1 June, after suffering relegation.

On 12 January 2026, after more than seven months without a club, Fernández Romo was named as Racing Ferrol's second manager of the campaign on a deal until June. On 26 May, with the club only finishing in 12th place, he left.

== Managerial statistics ==
As of match played 19 April 2026

Managerial record by team and tenure
Team	Nat	From	To	Record								Ref
Team	Nat	From	To	G	W	D	L	GF	GA	GD	Win %	Ref
Noja	(Spain)	1 July 2010	22 June 2011	45	26	9	10	68	39	+29	57.78	
Villalonga	(Spain)	1 July 2012	11 December 2012	16	5	5	6	12	14	−2	31.25	
Olímpic Xàtiva	(Spain)	10 July 2015	8 February 2016	24	6	6	12	14	24	−10	25.00	
Sabadell	(Spain)	24 January 2017	22 June 2017	16	4	9	3	18	14	+4	25.00	
Jumilla	(Spain)	10 April 2018	22 May 2018	5	4	1	0	8	3	+5	80.00	
Ejea	(Spain)	13 August 2018	10 June 2019	40	11	14	15	31	38	−7	27.50	
Cornellà	(Spain)	10 June 2019	19 May 2021	61	29	17	15	75	58	+17	47.54	
Racing Santander	(Spain)	26 May 2021	12 December 2022	62	32	13	17	80	51	+29	51.61	
Ibiza	(Spain)	6 June 2023	29 April 2024	35	18	9	8	54	33	+21	51.43	
Cartagena	(Spain)	14 January 2025	1 June 2025	20	2	2	16	18	42	−24	10.00	
Racing Ferrol	(Spain)	12 January 2026	Present	14	4	3	7	12	20	−8	28.57	
Career total				338	141	88	109	390	336	+54	41.72	—
