= Juanvi Peinado =

Spanish football manager

Personal information
- Full name: Juan Vicente Peinado Fernández
- Date of birth: 26 June 1973 (age 53)
- Place of birth: Madrid, Spain
- Height: 1.82 m (6 ft 0 in)
- Position: Goalkeeper

Team information
- Current team: Ajax (assistant)

Youth career
- San Bruno
- 1990–1991: Carabanchel

Senior career*
Years	Team	Apps	(Gls)
1991–1993	Carabanchel		
1993–1994	Getafe	6	(0)
1994–1998	Fuenlabrada	106	(0)
1998–2000	Móstoles	55	(0)
2000–2001	Atlético Valdemoro		
2001	Moscardó		
2001–2002	Mensajero	17	(0)

Managerial career
- 2002–2004: Móstoles (youth)
- 2004–2005: Trival Valderas (youth)
- 2005–2006: Leganés B
- 2006–2009: Real Madrid (youth)
- 2009: Alcobendas Sport
- 2009–2011: Villarreal (youth)
- 2011–2013: Alcobendas Sport
- 2013–2015: Rayo Vallecano (youth)
- 2015–2017: Rayo Vallecano B
- 2017: Móstoles URJC
- 2018–2019: Rayo Majadahonda (assistant)
- 2019–2022: Sevilla (assistant)
- 2022–2023: Wolverhampton Wanderers (assistant)
- 2024–2025: West Ham United (assistant)
- 2026: Guadalajara
- 2026–: Ajax (assistant)
- * Club domestic league appearances and goals

Juan Vicente "Juanvi" Peinado Fernández (born 26 June 1973) is a Spanish retired footballer who played as a goalkeeper, and the current assistant manager of Dutch club Ajax.

== Playing career ==
Born in Madrid, Peinado began his career with San Bruno, before making his senior debut with Tercera División side Carabanchel. He joined Segunda División B side Getafe in 1993, but was a backup to Pedro Sánchez Caballero during the season as the club achieved promotion to the Segunda División.

Peinado subsequently played for fellow third division sides Fuenlabrada and Móstoles, before moving to Atlético Valdemoro in the regional leagues in 2000 after the birth of his son. He later played for Moscardó in the fourth division and Mensajero in the third tier before retiring in 2002, aged 29.

== Managerial career ==
Shortly after retiring, Peinado was a manager of the Cadete squad of Móstoles while also working as a goalkeeping coach in the first team. He moved to Trival Valderas in 2004, being in charge of the Juvenil A while also keeping his first team role.

In February 2005, after the arrival of Quique Estebaranz at Leganés, Peinado joined his staff as a goalkeeping coach; he also became the manager of the reserves in division four. In January 2006, he joined the structure of Real Madrid, being a manager of the Cadete B and Juvenil B teams.

After departing Real Madrid in 2009, Peinado spent a short period ahead of Alcobendas Sport, before joining the youth sides of Villarreal in October of that year. He returned to Alcobendas in 2011, and remained in charge until March 2013.

In October 2013, Peinado was named at the helm of Rayo Vallecano's Juvenil B team. In March 2015, he took over the reserves in the third tier, but was unable to avoid relegation.

Peinado left Rayo B on 12 June 2017, and was named at the helm of fellow fourth division side Móstoles URJC three days later. Sacked on 28 November, he joined the staff of Antonio Iriondo the following 5 July, as his assistant.

On 20 June 2019, Peinado left the Majariegos to join Julen Lopetegui's staff at Sevilla. He followed Lopetegui to English sides Wolverhampton Wanderers and West Ham United, both in the same role.

On 14 January 2026, Peinado returned to managerial duties after being appointed at the helm of Primera Federación side Guadalajara. Unable to avoid relegation, he left on 2 June, and was appointed as an assistant of Míchel at Ajax later on that month.

== Managerial statistics ==
As of 3 June 2026

Managerial record by team and tenure
Team	Nat	From	To	Record								Ref
Team	Nat	From	To	G	W	D	L	GF	GA	GD	Win %	Ref
Leganés B	(Spain)	7 February 2005	9 January 2006	34	8	8	18	32	54	−22	23.53	
Alcobendas Sport	(Spain)	1 July 2009	12 October 2009	8	2	3	3	9	14	−5	25.00	
Alcobendas Sport	(Spain)	1 July 2011	31 March 2013	74	25	23	26	93	89	+4	33.78	
Rayo Vallecano B	(Spain)	10 March 2015	12 June 2017	86	26	31	29	111	98	+13	30.23	
Móstoles URJC	(Spain)	15 June 2017	28 November 2017	15	5	5	5	21	22	−1	33.33	
Guadalajara	(Spain)	14 January 2026	2 June 2026	19	6	5	8	25	28	−3	31.58	
Career total				236	72	75	89	291	305	−14	30.51	—
