= Rubén Domínguez (footballer) =

Spanish football manager (born 1987)

Personal information
- Full name: Rubén Alberto Domínguez Rodríguez
- Date of birth: 23 May 1987 (age 39)
- Place of birth: Ourense, Spain
- Position: Midfielder

Team information
- Current team: Pontevedra (manager)

Senior career*
Years	Team	Apps	(Gls)
–2012	Taboadela		

Managerial career
- 2011–2012: Taboadela (assistant)
- 2012–2014: Taboadela
- 2014–2016: Ourense
- 2017–2018: Deportivo La Coruña (youth)
- 2020–2024: Ourense
- 2025–: Pontevedra
- * Club domestic league appearances and goals

Rubén Alberto Domínguez Rodríguez (born 23 May 1987) is a Spanish former footballer who played as a midfielder, and a manager, currently in charge of Pontevedra CF.

== Career ==
Born in Ourense, Galicia, Domínguez was known as Juninho during his playing days. He played for UP Taboadela as a senior, before becoming an assistant manager of the club during his last active season. After retiring, he immediately became their manager in 2012.

On 26 June 2014, Domínguez was appointed manager of Ourense CF in the Primeira Autonómica de Galicia. He achieved promotion to the Preferente de Galicia in his first year before leaving on 24 May 2016.

Domínguez subsequently worked as an analyst for CE L'Hospitalet, and joined the structure of Deportivo de La Coruña in 2017, being named manager of the Cadete A squad which were playing under the name of San Tirso SD. On 28 July 2020, he returned to Ourense, being named manager of the side now in Tercera División.

Domínguez led Ourense to a first-ever promotion to Segunda Federación in 2022, and renewed his contract with the club on 31 May of that year. In November 2023, he reached 200 matches in charge of the club, and led them to promotion to Primera Federación as champions of their group at the end of that season.

On 22 October 2024, after a winless start of the 2024–25 campaign, Domínguez resigned. The following 31 May, he was named manager of Pontevedra CF also in the third division.

== Managerial statistics ==
As of 15 November 2026

Managerial record by team and tenure
Team	Nat	From	To	Record								Ref
Team	Nat	From	To	G	W	D	L	GF	GA	GD	Win %	Ref
Taboadela	(Spain)	1 July 2012	26 June 2014	68	29	15	24	96	95	+1	42.65	
Ourense	(Spain)	26 June 2014	24 May 2016	72	34	18	20	104	87	+17	47.22	
Ourense	(Spain)	28 July 2020	22 October 2024	151	69	42	40	208	140	+68	45.70	
Pontevedra	(Spain)	31 May 2025	Present	53	20	20	13	66	50	+16	37.74	
Career total				344	152	95	97	474	372	+102	44.19	—
