= Unai Mendia =

Spanish football manager (born 1981)

Personal information
- Full name: Unai Mendia Sarasola
- Date of birth: 16 May 1981 (age 45)
- Place of birth: Beasain, Spain

Team information
- Current team: Logroñés (manager)

Managerial career
- Years: Team
- Beasain (youth)
- Aloña Mendi
- 2015–2016: Idiazabal
- 2016–2018: Beasain B
- 2016–2018: Beasain (assistant)
- 2018–2019: Ordizia
- 2019–2020: Mirandés (assistant)
- 2020–2022: Rayo Vallecano (assistant)
- 2022–2023: Bolívar (assistant)
- 2024–2025: Teruel
- 2025–: Logroñés

Unai Mendia Sarasola (born 16 May 1981) is a Spanish football manager, currently in charge of UD Logroñés.

== Career ==
Born in Beasain, Gipuzkoa, Basque Country, Mendia began his career with the youth sides of hometown club SD Beasain, before becoming the manager of Aloña Mendi KE and Idiazabal KE in the regional leagues. In July 2016, he returned to Beasain, becoming an assistant of the main squad while also taking over their B-team.

On 27 June 2018, Mendia was appointed manager of Tercera División side Ordizia KE. In the following year, he joined Andoni Iraola's staff at CD Mirandés as his assistant, and followed him to Rayo Vallecano in 2020.

On 10 June 2022, Mendia parted ways with Iraola to return to managerial duties. In November, however, he became an assistant of compatriot Beñat San José at Bolivian side Club Bolívar.

Mendia departed Bolívar with San José in November 2023, and was appointed manager of Segunda Federación side CD Teruel on 12 June 2024. He led the club back to Primera Federación at the end of the season, but departed on 6 June 2025.

Hours after leaving Teruel, Mendia was appointed manager of UD Logroñés back in division four. On 3 June 2026, after again leading the club to a promotion to division three, he renewed his link for a further year.
