= Unax Álvarez =

Spanish footballer (born 2002)

Personal information
- Full name: Unax Álvarez de Eulate Oyanguren
- Date of birth: 26 February 2002 (age 24)
- Place of birth: Vitoria-Gasteiz, Spain
- Height: 1.75 m (5 ft 9 in)
- Position: Winger

Team information
- Current team: St Johnstone
- Number: 77

Senior career*
Years	Team	Apps	(Gls)
–2022	San Ignacio		
2022–2023	Alavés B	11	(1)
2023	→ Portugalete (loan)		
2023–2024	CD Toledo		
2024–2026	CD Guadalajara	67	(20)
2026–	St Johnstone	0	(0)
- * Club domestic league appearances and goals as of 13:03, 20 June 2026 (UTC)

Unax Álvarez de Eulate Oyanguren (born 26 February 2002) is a Spanish professional footballer who plays as a winger for St Johnstone.

== Early life ==
Álvarez was born on 26 February 2002 and raised in Vitoria-Gasteiz, Spain. He spent time in the youth academy of Deportivo Alavés.

== Career ==
Álvarez played for Tercera Federación team San Ignacio in his hometown of Vitoria-Gasteiz, scoring eight goals in 33 appearances during the 2021–22 season.

During the summer of 2022, Álvarez signed for Deportivo Alavés B, the reserve team for La Liga side Deportivo Alavés, where he played in the Segunda Federación and scored one goal. In early 2023, he was loaned to Portugalete as he felt he was not getting enough minutes with Alavés B.

In 2023, he signed for CD Toledo in the Tercera Federación.

In 2024, Álvarez signed for CD Guadalajara of the Primera Federación. After two seasons, it was announced that he would depart the club.

In June 2026, Álvarez signed for Scottish Premiership side St Johnstone on a two year deal, subject to work permit.
