= José Herrera (football manager) =

Spanish football manager (born 1978)

Personal information
- Full name: José Manuel Pérez Herrera
- Date of birth: 4 October 1978 (age 48)
- Place of birth: Jerez de la Frontera, Spain

Youth career
- Years: Team
- Xerez

Managerial career
- 2002–2003: Mundo Nuevo (youth)
- 2004–2006: Rapid Ibiza (youth)
- 2006–2010: Nueva Jarilla (youth)
- 2010–2011: Liberación (youth)
- 2011–2014: Sanluqueño (youth)
- 2014: Sanluqueño B
- 2014–2016: Sanluqueño
- 2016–2017: Arcos
- 2017–2019: San Fernando
- 2019–2020: Ibiza Islas Pitiusas
- 2020–2022: Xerez Deportivo
- 2025: Sanluqueño

José Manuel Pérez Herrera (born 4 October 1978) is a Spanish football manager.

== Career ==
Herrera was born in Jerez de la Frontera, Cádiz, Andalusia, and played for hometown side Xerez CD as a youth before retiring. He began his managerial career with SD Mundo Nuevo at the age of 23, and went on to work at CF Rapid Ibiza, Nueva Jarilla AD and Liberación CF before joining Atlético Sanluqueño CF in 2011, as a manager of the Cadete squad.

Herrera was subsequently in charge of the Juvenil and B teams of Sanluqueño before being appointed manager of the first team in Tercera División on 31 December 2014, after Puma resigned. On 2 July 2016, after leading the side to a promotion to Segunda División B, he opted to leave the club, and took over Arcos CF in the fourth division two days later.

On 19 June 2017, Herrera was named manager of San Fernando CD in the third tier. On 4 June 2019, after two mid-table campaigns, he departed the club.

On 26 June 2019, Herrera agreed to become the manager of fourth division side CD Ibiza Islas Pitiusas on a two-year contract. On 2 July of the following year, the club announced that he would depart the side after the play-offs, which they ultimately lost to RCD Mallorca B.

On 9 August 2020, Herrera was named at the helm of Xerez Deportivo FC also in division four. He led the club to a promotion to Segunda División RFEF in his first season, later becoming the manager with most matches in charge of the side, before being sacked on 24 October 2022.

On 4 May 2025, Herrera returned to Sanluqueño as the club's fifth manager of the campaign, with the club in Primera Federación.On 29 December, Herrera was sacked by Sanluqueño with the side sitting second bottom in their group with three wins from 17 league matches.

== Managerial statistics ==
As of 21 December 2025

Managerial record by team and tenure
Team	Nat	From	To	Record								Ref
Team	Nat	From	To	G	W	D	L	GF	GA	GD	Win %	Ref
Sanluqueño B	(Spain)	1 July 2014	31 December 2014	15	6	7	2	28	21	+7	40.00	
Sanluqueño	(Spain)	31 December 2014	2 July 2016	73	41	17	15	122	63	+59	56.16	
Arcos	(Spain)	4 July 2016	19 June 2017	42	23	11	8	81	43	+38	54.76	
San Fernando	(Spain)	19 June 2017	4 June 2019	76	29	22	25	91	82	+9	38.16	
Ibiza Islas Pitiusas	(Spain)	26 June 2019	21 July 2020	28	18	8	2	56	16	+40	64.29	
Xerez Deportivo	(Spain)	8 August 2020	24 October 2022	70	30	20	20	76	71	+5	42.86	
Sanluqueño	(Spain)	4 May 2025	29 December 2025	20	5	7	8	20	24	−4	25.00	
Total				324	152	92	80	474	320	+154	46.91	—
