= Dani Llácer =

Spanish football manager (born 1989)

Personal information
- Full name: Daniel Ángel Llácer Fernández
- Date of birth: 3 March 1989 (age 37)
- Place of birth: Quart de Poblet, Spain
- Height: 1.68 m (5 ft 6 in)
- Position: Winger

Team information
- Current team: Athletico Paranaense U20 (head coach)

Youth career
- 2002–2005: Valencia
- 2005–2008: Levante

Senior career*
Years	Team	Apps	(Gls)
2008–2010	Levante B		
2010–2011	Torre Levante		
2011	Alberic		
2011–2012	Quart de Poblet		
2012	Buñol		
2013	Saguntino		
2013–2014	Harrow Borough	9	(0)
2014	Corinthian-Casuals		
2014–2015	Chipstead		
2015–2020	Juventud Barrio Cristo	123	(32)

Managerial career
- 2020–2021: Elche B (assistant)
- 2021–2022: Recreativo (assistant)
- 2022–2023: Elche B (assistant)
- 2022: Elche B (interim)
- 2023–2024: Unionistas (assistant)
- 2024–2025: Unionistas
- 2025–2026: Ourense
- 2026–: Athletico Paranaense U20
- * Club domestic league appearances and goals

Daniel Ángel "Dani" Llácer Fernández (born 3 March 1990) is a Spanish football manager and former player who played as a winger. He is the current head coach of the under-20 team of Brazilian club Athletico Paranaense.

== Playing career ==
Llácer was born in Quart de Poblet, Valencian Community, and represented Valencia CF and Levante UD as a youth. After making his senior debut with the reserves in the 2008–09 season in Tercera División, he moved to Torre Levante CF in the Regional Preferente in 2010.

After playing for fifth tier sides CE Alberic, UD Quart de Poblet and CD Buñol, Llácer returned to the fourth division in December 2012, after agreeing to a deal with Atlético Saguntino. In the 2013 summer, he moved abroad for the first time in his career, after signing for Harrow Borough FC of the Isthmian League Premier Division, but only played 12 matches for the club.

In January 2014, Llácer joined Corinthian-Casuals FC of the Isthmian League Division One South, and subsequently represented fellow league team Chipstead FC before returning to Spain on 30 July 2015, with UD Juventud Barrio del Cristo.

Llácer became team captain of Juventud in 2019, and retired with the club in 2020, aged 30.

== Managerial career ==
Llácer was an analyst of Alessio Lisci's staff at Levante during the 2019–20 season, before joining Pau Quesada's staff at Elche CF Ilicitano as his assistant in 2020. In June 2021, he moved to Recreativo de Huelva as Alberto Gallego's assistant, and followed him back to Elche Ilicitano under the same role in the following year.

On 9 July 2023, Llácer joined Primera Federación side Unionistas de Salamanca CF as Dani Ponz's assistant. The following 28 May, he was appointed manager of the club after Ponz opted to leave.

On 7 April 2025, Llácer was dismissed by Unionistas. On 19 July, he was named at the helm of fellow third division side Ourense CF, and led the club to the 2025 Copa Federación title, also knocking out La Liga sides Real Oviedo and Girona FC in the 2025–26 Copa del Rey.

Llácer was sacked from the Galicians on 13 May 2026, with the club seriously threatened with relegation. On 13 August, he moved to Brazil and was named head coach of Athletico Paranaense's under-20 team.

== Managerial statistics ==
As of match played 26 April 2026

Managerial record by team and tenure
Team	Nat	From	To	Record								Ref
Team	Nat	From	To	G	W	D	L	GF	GA	GD	Win %	Ref
Elche B (interim)	(Spain)	5 October 2022	12 October 2022	1	1	0	0	2	0	+2	100.00	
Unionistas	(Spain)	28 May 2024	7 April 2025	33	10	13	10	46	42	+4	30.30	
Ourense	(Spain)	19 July 2025	Present	43	16	12	15	61	49	+12	37.21	
Career total				77	27	25	25	109	91	+18	35.06	—

== Honours ==
=== Manager ===
Ourense

- Copa Federación de España: 2025
