= El Garrobo =

El Garrobo, Spain
- city
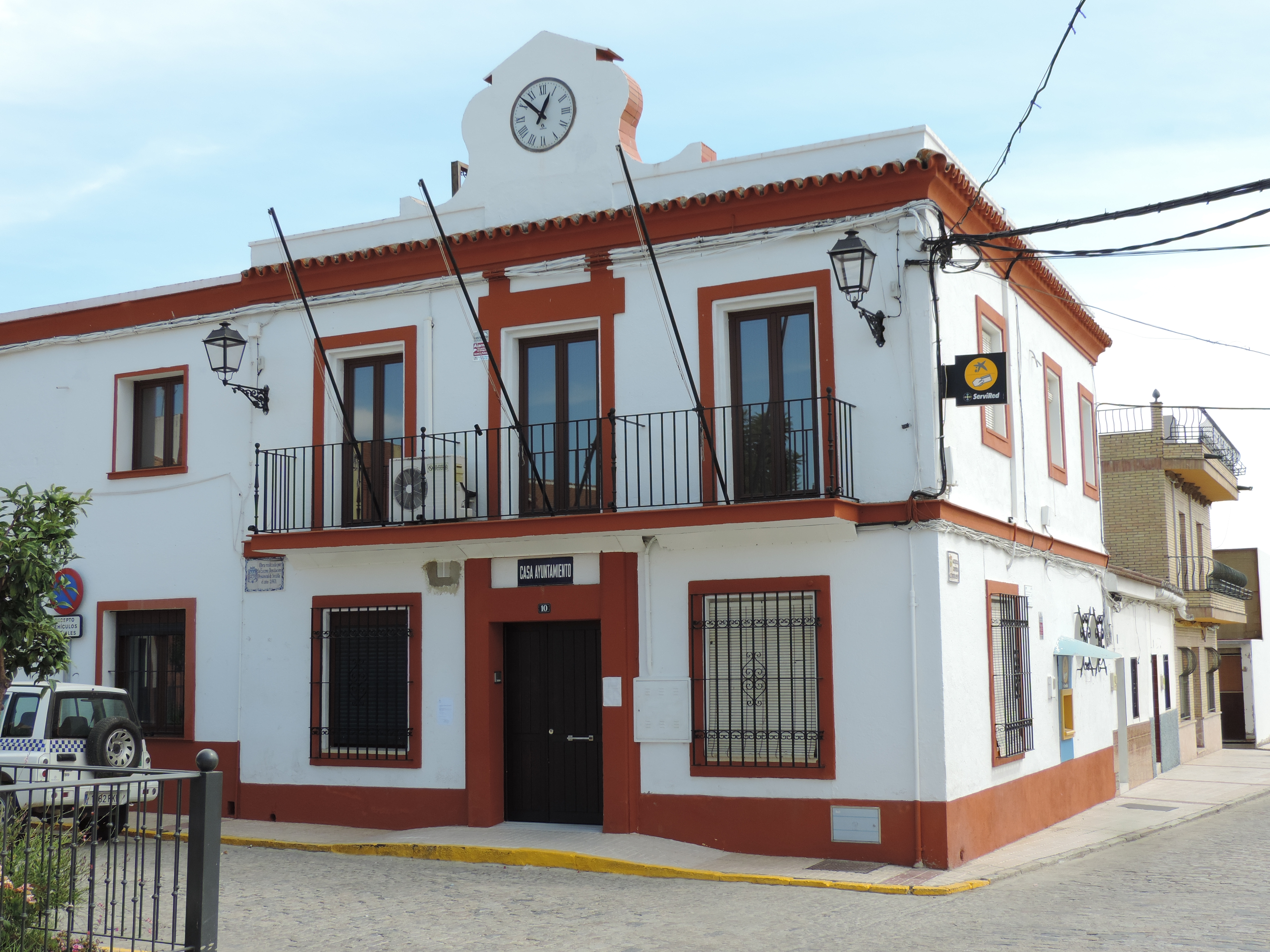
- El Garrobo Town Hall

- Flag Coat of arms
- Interactive map of El Garrobo, Spain
- Coordinates: 37°37′N 6°10′W
- Country: Spain
- Province: Seville
- Municipality: El Garrobo

Area
  - Total: 45 km^{2} (17 sq mi)
- Elevation: 275 m (902 ft)

Population (2025-01-01)
  - Total: 800
  - Density: 18/km^{2} (46/sq mi)
- Time zone: UTC+1 (CET)
  - Summer (DST): UTC+2 (CEST)

El Garrobo is a city located in the province of Seville, Spain. According to the 2005 census (INE), the city has a population of 808 inhabitants.

== See also ==
- List of municipalities in Seville
