= Pedro Mateos =

Spanish football manager and former player

Personal information
- Full name: Pedro Mateos Barba
- Date of birth: 9 September 1992 (age 34)
- Place of birth: Rota, Spain
- Height: 1.77 m (5 ft 10 in)
- Position: Midfielder

Team information
- Current team: Cádiz B (manager)

Youth career
- Rota

Senior career*
Years	Team	Apps	(Gls)
2007–2015	Rota	139	(11)
2015–2018	Roteña	87	(6)
Total		226	(17)

Managerial career
- 2019–2021: Roteña (youth)
- 2022–2023: Balón de Cádiz (youth)
- 2023–2026: Cádiz (youth)
- 2026: Sanluqueño
- 2026–: Cádiz B
- * Club domestic league appearances and goals

Pedro Mateos Barba (born 27 February 1987) is a Spanish retired footballer who played as a midfielder, and the current manager of Cádiz CF Mirandilla.

== Playing career ==
Born in Rota, Cádiz, Andalusia, Mateos played for hometown side CD Rota in the regional leagues, before moving to Tercera División side UD Roteña in 2015. Despite suffering two consecutive relegations, he renewed his contract with the latter in August 2017, but struggled with injuries, and retired in 2018, aged just 25.

== Coaching career ==
After retiring, Mateos began working with his last side Roteña, as a manager of the youth categories. In July 2021, he moved abroad for the first time in his career, joining the staff of Portuguese Jaime Monroy at Greek side Xanthi FC, as a match analyst.

Back to his home country after Monroy was sacked, Mateos joined the structure of Cádiz CF in July 2022, being the manager of the Cadete B squad of affiliate team Balón de Cádiz CF. He took over the Cadete A squad of Cádiz in the following year, before being promoted to the Juvenil A in July 2024.

On 14 January 2026, Mateos left Cádiz after being appointed manager of Primera Federación side Atlético Sanluqueño CF. On 26 May, after failing to avoid relegation, he returned to his previous club, and was appointed in charge of the reserves on 11 June.

== Managerial statistics ==
As of 25 April 2026

Managerial record by team and tenure
Team	Nat	From	To	Record								Ref
Team	Nat	From	To	G	W	D	L	GF	GA	GD	Win %	Ref
Sanluqueño	(Spain)	14 January 2026	Present	15	4	2	9	11	22	−11	26.67	
Total				15	4	2	9	11	22	−11	26.67	—
