= Yago Iglesias =

Spanish football manager

- Iglesias in 2023

Personal information
- Full name: Santiago Iglesias Estepa
- Date of birth: 6 October 1982 (age 44)
- Place of birth: Palmeira, Spain

Team information
- Current team: Avilés Industrial (manager)

Managerial career
- Years: Team
- 2007–2009: Boiro (assistant)
- 2009–2010: Pontevedra B (assistant)
- 2010–2011: Palmeira
- 2011–2012: Portonovo (assistant)
- 2013–2014: Atlético Riveira
- 2014–2015: Santiago de Compostela (youth)
- 2015–2016: Noia
- 2016–2021: Compostela
- 2021–2023: Zamora
- 2023–2025: Pontevedra
- 2025–2026: Lugo
- 2026–: Avilés Industrial

Santiago "Yago" Iglesias Estepa (born 6 October 1982) is a Spanish football manager, currently in charge of Real Avilés Industrial CF.

== Career ==
Born in Palmeira, Ribeira, Galicia, Iglesias worked at CD Boiro and Pontevedra CF B before starting his senior managerial career with CS Hijos de Palmeira, in the Terceira Autonómica, in 2010. After being an assistant at Portonovo SD, he joined Raúl Caneda's staff at Al-Ittihad FC.

Iglesias returned to Spain in January 2013, after being retained in Saudi Arabia due to paperwork problems. On 22 July of that year, he took over Atlético de Riveira also in the regional leagues.

In July 2015, after working with Santiago de Compostela CF's Juvenil squad, Iglesias was named manager of CF Noia in Tercera División. On 21 June of the following year, he took over fellow league team SD Compostela.

In 2020, after reaching three consecutive play-offs with Compos, Iglesias' side finally achieved promotion to Segunda División B, returning to the category after four seasons. He renewed his contract for a further campaign in August of that year.

In May 2021, Iglesias left Compostela after five years, and took over Primera División RFEF side Zamora CF on 23 November. He departed the latter on 30 May 2023, after a relegation and a subsequent knockout in the promotion play-offs.

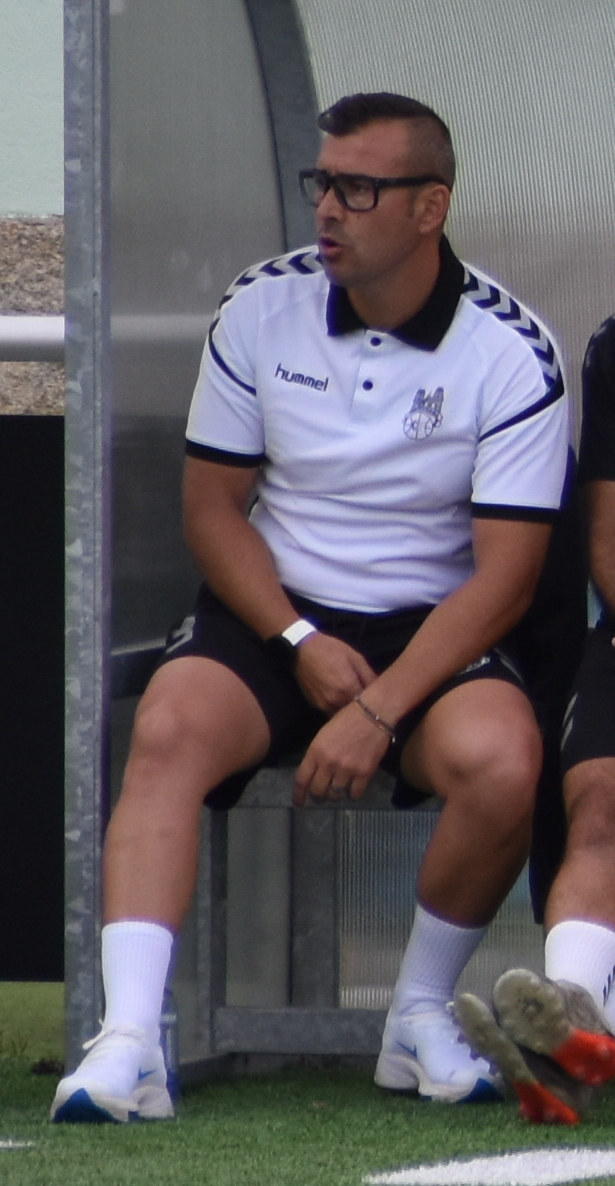
Iglesias as manager of Pontevedra in 2023

On 16 June 2023, Iglesias was appointed in charge of Pontevedra CF in Segunda Federación. On 28 May 2025, after achieving promotion after finishing first in their group, he left the club.

On 19 June 2025, Iglesias was named as the new manager of Primera Federación side CD Lugo on a contract for the upcoming campaign. He was sacked the following 22 March, after a 1–1 draw against Arenas Club de Getxo earlier the same day.

On 10 June 2026, Iglesias was appointed in charge of Real Avilés Industrial CF, also in division three, on a two-year contract.

== Managerial statistics ==
As of match played 6 November 2026

Managerial record by team and tenure
Team	Nat	From	To	Record								Ref
Team	Nat	From	To	G	W	D	L	GF	GA	GD	Win %	Ref
Palmeira	(Spain)	30 June 2010	1 July 2011	28	20	6	2	76	23	+53	71.43	
Atlético Riveira	(Spain)	22 July 2013	30 June 2014	38	13	10	15	54	50	+4	34.21	
Noia	(Spain)	20 July 2015	16 May 2016	38	8	8	22	28	59	−31	21.05	
Compostela	(Spain)	21 June 2016	14 May 2021	180	93	44	43	313	185	+128	51.67	
Zamora	(Spain)	23 November 2021	30 May 2023	68	27	18	23	77	75	+2	39.71	
Pontevedra	(Spain)	16 June 2023	28 May 2025	77	45	18	14	133	69	+64	58.44	
Lugo	(Spain)	19 June 2025	22 March 2026	29	10	12	7	28	28	+0	34.48	
Avilés Industrial	(Spain)	10 June 2026	Present	11	5	2	4	23	15	+8	45.45	
Career total				469	221	118	130	732	504	+228	47.12	—
