= Fernando Estévez (football manager) =

Spanish football manager

Personal information
- Full name: Fernando Estévez Martín
- Date of birth: 1 June 1979 (age 47)
- Place of birth: Capileira, Spain

Team information
- Current team: Cultural Leonesa (manager)

Managerial career
- Years: Team
- 2004–2006: Vélez Rubio
- 2007–2009: Granada B
- 2009–2013: Loja
- 2014–2015: Guijuelo
- 2015–2016: Almería B
- 2017–2018: Marbella
- 2018–2019: Burgos
- 2020–2021: Badajoz
- 2022–2024: Eldense
- 2025: Ponferradina
- 2026–: Cultural Leonesa

Fernando Estévez Martín (born 1 June 1979) is a Spanish football manager, who is currently in charge of Cultural y Deportiva Leonesa.

== Career ==
Born in Capileira, Granada, Andalusia, Estévez began his managerial career with Vélez Rubio CF in 2004, in the Regional Preferente. After achieving promotion to Primera Andaluza in his first season, he left the club in 2006 to work as a doctor in Guadix.

Estévez returned to managerial duties in 2007, with Granada CF's reserves. He also led the side to Primera Andaluza in his first year, and took over Tercera División side Loja CD in July 2009.

Estévez achieved a first-ever promotion to Segunda División B with Loja in 2012, but departed the club on 31 May 2013, after their immediate relegation. On 30 June 2014, after a year without coaching, he was named in charge of CD Guijuelo in the third tier.

Estévez left Guijuelo at the end of the 2014–15 season, and was appointed UD Almería B manager on 23 December 2015, replacing Miguel Rivera. After suffering relegation, he left.

On 7 June 2017, Estévez was named at the helm of Marbella FC, still in division three. He left on 21 June 2018, and was appointed manager of fellow league team Burgos CF on 26 October.

Estévez was sacked by Burgos on 7 October 2019, and was named CD Badajoz manager roughly one year later. Despite finishing the 2020–21 campaign as the best team of the division, his side was unable to achieve promotion after losing the last round of the play-offs; on 2 July 2021, he left the club on a mutual agreement.

On 11 July 2022, after another year without a club, Estévez was appointed manager of CD Eldense in Primera Federación. He led the side to a promotion to Segunda División after 59 years of absence, after defeating Raúl's Real Madrid Castilla in the finals of the play-offs.

Estévez's first professional match as manager occurred on 13 August 2023, a 1–0 away win over FC Cartagena. On 22 June of the following year, after avoiding relegation, he left the club.

On 28 June 2025, after more than a year without a club, Estévez was named manager of SD Ponferradina in the third division. On 25 November, after three winless matches, he was sacked.

On 18 November 2026, after nearly a year without a club, Estévez was appointed in charge of Cultural y Deportiva Leonesa, also in division three.

== Personal life ==
Estévez is also an emergency doctor, and worked in that profession during the COVID-19 pandemic. His brother Miguel was a footballer; a midfielder, he never played in any higher than Tercera División, and both were together at Vélez Rubio.

== Managerial statistics ==
As of 23 November 2025

Managerial record by team and tenure
Team	Nat	From	To	Record								Ref
Team	Nat	From	To	G	W	D	L	GF	GA	GD	Win %	Ref
Vélez Rubio	(Spain)	1 July 2004	30 June 2006	60	28	15	17	86	65	+21	46.67	
Granada B	(Spain)	1 July 2007	30 June 2009	66	29	18	19	102	77	+25	43.94	
Loja	(Spain)	28 July 2009	31 May 2013	163	73	42	48	237	180	+57	44.79	
Guijuelo	(Spain)	30 June 2014	11 May 2015	39	17	10	12	58	49	+9	43.59	
Almería B	(Spain)	23 December 2015	20 May 2016	20	3	6	11	15	31	−16	15.00	
Marbella	(Spain)	7 June 2017	21 June 2018	42	22	10	10	54	32	+22	52.38	
Burgos	(Spain)	26 October 2018	7 October 2019	36	11	13	12	30	34	−4	30.56	
Badajoz	(Spain)	18 October 2020	2 July 2021	26	17	5	4	44	14	+30	65.38	
Eldense	(Spain)	11 July 2022	22 June 2024	89	34	29	26	111	102	+9	38.20	
Ponferradina	(Spain)	28 June 2025	25 November 2025	14	5	4	5	16	13	+3	35.71	
Cultural Leonesa	(Spain)	18 November 2026	present	0	0	0	0	0	0	+0	—	
Career total				555	239	152	164	753	597	+156	43.06	—
