= Luci (footballer) =

Spanish footballer

Personal information
- Full name: Luciano Martín Toscano
- Date of birth: 17 August 1972 (age 54)
- Place of birth: Lepe, Spain
- Height: 1.92 m (6 ft 4 in)
- Position: Centre back

Youth career
- San Roque Lepe
- 1988–1991: Sevilla

Senior career*
| Years | Team | Apps | (Gls) |
| 1991–1995 | Sevilla B | 60+ | (2+) |
| 1995–1999 | Recreativo | 100 | (3) |
| 1999–2000 | Levante | 6 | (0) |
| 2000–2001 | Ceuta | 27 | (1) |
| 2001–2005 | San Roque Lepe | | |

Managerial career
- 2005–2007: Deportivo La Coruña (assistant)
- 2007–2011: Athletic Bilbao (assistant)
- 2011: Neuchâtel Xamax (assistant)
- 2011–2013: Mallorca (assistant)
- 2013–2014: Levante (assistant)
- 2014–2015: Granada (assistant)
- 2016–2017: Osasuna (assistant)
- 2017: Al Ahli (assistant)
- 2018: Sevilla (assistant)
- 2018–2019: Sevilla B
- 2020–2022: Armenia (assistant)
- 2025: Sevilla (assistant)
- 2025–2026: Sevilla B
- * Club domestic league appearances and goals

Luciano Martín Toscano (born 17 August 1972), commonly known as Luci, is a Spanish former footballer who played as a central defender, and is a current manager.

== Managerial statistics ==
As of match played 6 March 2026

Managerial record by team and tenure
| Team | Nat | From | To | Record | | | | | | | | Ref |
| Team | Nat | From | To | G | W | D | L | GF | GA | GD | Win % | Ref |
|---|---|---|---|---|---|---|---|---|---|---|---|---|
| Sevilla B | (Spain) | 15 June 2018 | 26 May 2019 | 38 | 13 | 9 | 16 | 37 | 46 | −9 | 34.21 | |
| Sevilla B | (Spain) | 7 November 2025 | 9 March 2026 | 17 | 2 | 5 | 10 | 8 | 21 | −13 | 11.76 | |
| Career total | | | | 55 | 15 | 14 | 26 | 45 | 67 | −22 | 27.27 | — |
