= Javi Vázquez (footballer, born 1986) =

Spanish footballer (born 1986)

Personal information
- Full name: Javier Vázquez Contreras
- Date of birth: 10 July 1986 (age 40)
- Place of birth: Madrid, Spain
- Height: 1.80 m (5 ft 11 in)
- Position: Midfielder

Team information
- Current team: Racing Ferrol (manager)

Youth career
- SS Reyes

Senior career*
| Years | Team | Apps | (Gls) |
| 2005–2007 | SS Reyes B | | |
| 2007–2008 | SS Reyes | 10 | (0) |
| 2008–2009 | Portuense | 27 | (1) |
| 2009–2010 | SS Reyes | 21 | (0) |
| 2010–2011 | Getafe B | 12 | (1) |
| 2011–2015 | SS Reyes | 109 | (10) |
| Total | | 179 | (11) |

Managerial career
- 2016–2017: SS Reyes B (assistant)
- 2017–2018: Alalpardo
- 2018–2019: Unión Adarve (youth)
- 2019–2020: Unión Adarve
- 2020–2021: Real Madrid (youth)
- 2022: Panathinaikos B
- 2022–2024: Langreo
- 2024–2025: Talavera
- 2025–2026: Algeciras
- 2026–: Racing Ferrol
- * Club domestic league appearances and goals

Javier "Javi" Vázquez Contreras (born 10 July 1986) is a Spanish retired footballer who played as a midfielder, and the current manager of Racing de Ferrol.

== Playing career ==
Born in Madrid, Vázquez began his career with UD San Sebastián de los Reyes, making his senior debut with the reserves before first appearing with the main squad during the 2007–08 season, in Segunda División B. He moved to fellow third division Racing Club Portuense in 2008, but also suffered relegation.

Back to Sanse in 2009, Vázquez had a one-year spell at Getafe CF B before returning to the club in 2011. He only became a starter in his third stint, but retired in 2015, aged 29.

== Managerial career ==
After retiring, Vázquez became Miguel Marín's assistant at San Sebastián de los Reyes B in June 2016. In 2018, after a period as manager of CF Alalpardo, he took over the Juvenil side of AD Unión Adarve.

On 26 May 2019, Vázquez was named manager of Adarve's first team in Tercera División. On 29 June of the following year, agreed to move to Real Madrid's La Fábrica, as manager of the Juvenil B squad.

Vázquez departed Real Madrid on 14 June 2021, and remained seven months without a club before being announced at Greek side Panathinaikos FC on 18 January 2022, as manager of the B-team in Super League Greece 2.

Vázquez left Panathinaikos on 20 June 2022, returning to his home country. After another period of inactivity, he was named in charge of Segunda Federación side UP Langreo on 22 November, and renewed his link for a further year on 22 June 2023, after avoiding relegation.

On 22 May 2024, Vázquez departed Langreo after 57 official matches in charge, and took over fellow fourth division side CF Talavera de la Reina nine days later. He left the latter on 12 June 2025, after achieving promotion, and was named manager of Primera Federación side Algeciras CF two days later.

Vázquez left Algeciras on 2 June 2026, and took over fellow third division side Racing de Ferrol just hours later.

== Managerial statistics ==
As of 24 October 2026

Managerial record by team and tenure
| Team | Nat | From | To | Record | | | | | | | | Ref |
| Team | Nat | From | To | G | W | D | L | GF | GA | GD | Win % | Ref |
|---|---|---|---|---|---|---|---|---|---|---|---|---|
| Alalpardo | (Spain) | 1 July 2017 | 30 June 2018 | 34 | 21 | 6 | 7 | 97 | 46 | +51 | 61.76 | |
| Unión Adarve | (Spain) | 26 May 2019 | 31 August 2020 | 29 | 14 | 5 | 10 | 44 | 38 | +6 | 48.28 | |
| Panathinaikos B | (Greece) | 18 January 2022 | 20 June 2022 | 20 | 5 | 5 | 10 | 21 | 27 | −6 | 25.00 | |
| Langreo | (Spain) | 22 November 2022 | 22 May 2024 | 62 | 25 | 22 | 15 | 72 | 70 | +2 | 40.32 | |
| Talavera | (Spain) | 31 May 2024 | 12 June 2025 | 38 | 21 | 10 | 7 | 58 | 31 | +27 | 55.26 | |
| Algeciras | (Spain) | 14 June 2025 | 2 June 2026 | 38 | 15 | 10 | 13 | 40 | 41 | −1 | 39.47 | |
| Racing Ferrol | (Spain) | 2 June 2026 | present | 9 | 5 | 1 | 3 | 9 | 7 | +2 | 55.56 | |
| Career total | | | | 230 | 106 | 59 | 65 | 341 | 260 | +81 | 46.09 | — |
