= Marbella FC =

Spanish football club

Marbella
- Full name: Marbella Fútbol Club
- Nickname: Industrial (Industry)
- Founded: 1997; 29 years ago as Unión Deportiva Marbella
- Ground: Dama de Noche football ground Marbella, Spain
- Capacity: 1,500
- President: Zhao Zhen
- Head coach: David Cabello
- League: Segunda Federación – Group 4
- 2025–26: Primera Federación – Group 2, 18th of 20 (relegated)
Home colours	Away colours

Marbella Fútbol Club, formerly known as Unión Deportiva Marbella, is a Spanish football team based in Marbella, the autonomous community of Andalusia. Founded in 1997, it currently plays in Segunda Federación – Group 4, playing home matches at Dama de Noche football ground.

== History ==
Unión Deportiva Marbella was founded in 1997 immediately after the defunction of Club Atlético Marbella, which was founded 38 years before and was owned by Jesús Gil, also the chairman of Atlético de Madrid. In 2000–01, the team won its Tercera División group but came second to Real Betis B in the promotion play-offs. It subsequently qualified to the Copa del Rey for the first time, losing 0–1 at home to CD Díter Zafra in the preliminary round. In 2003, it was finally promoted to Segunda División B.

Marbella was taken over by businessmen Ian Radford and Wayne Elliott of the HI Group, an international sports, leisure, property and travel company in September 2007. In 2009, the club contested the play-offs for promotion to Segunda División for the first time, losing 2–1 on aggregate to Lorca Deportiva. In the ensuing domestic cup season, it reached the last 32 before an 8–0 aggregate loss to Atlético; the league campaign ended with relegation after seven years in the third tier.

On 28 June 2013 Unión was renamed Marbella Fútbol Club, by consent of the Russian ownership presided by Alexander Grinberg, in order to appeal to a wider foreign fanbase. At the end of the season, it ended four years in the fourth division with a 3–2 aggregate win over CD Eldense after extra time in the play-offs. By finishing second in the regular season, Marbella played in the 2018 Segunda División B play-offs, and lost on penalties in the first round to Celta de Vigo B.

Grinberg sold the club to Chinese investor Zhao Zhen in November 2018. In 2019–20, the team again came second and qualified for the play-offs, where all games were held in the local area due to the COVID-19 pandemic. Nonetheless, they lost 2–0 in the first round to SCR Peña Deportiva. A league restructuring meant that Marbella were relegated from the last season of the Segunda División B in 2020–21, dropping to the fifth-tier Tercera Federación.

After two years in the fifth tier, Marbella achieved promotion in April 2023 as champions of their group. Goalkeeper Alberto Lejárraga celebrated the occasion by coming out as gay.

Marbella's first season in the Segunda Federación ended in success, with promotion to the Primera Federación in June 2024. They defeated Getafe B and then UD Logrones in two two-legged play off games. Following promotion, it was announced that Brazilian midfielder Casemiro would be investing in the club.

=== Club background ===
- Atlético Marbella: 1947–1997
- UD Marbella: 1997–2013
- Marbella FC: 2013–present

== Season to season ==
- As UD Marbella

Season	Tier	Division	Place	Copa del Rey
1997–98	5	Reg. Pref.	1st	
1998–99	4	3ª	6th	
1999–2000	4	3ª	8th	
2000–01	4	3ª	1st	
2001–02	4	3ª	6th	Preliminary
2002–03	4	3ª	2nd	
2003–04	3	2ª B	15th	
2004–05	3	2ª B	5th	

Season	Tier	Division	Place	Copa del Rey
2005–06	3	2ª B	12th	Preliminary
2006–07	3	2ª B	7th	
2007–08	3	2ª B	15th	
2008–09	3	2ª B	4th	
2009–10	3	2ª B	19th	Round of 32
2010–11	4	3ª	10th	
2011–12	4	3ª	3rd	
2012–13	4	3ª	11th	

- As Marbella FC

Season	Tier	Division	Place	Copa del Rey
2013–14	4	3ª	1st	
2014–15	3	2ª B	10th	First round
2015–16	3	2ª B	14th	
2016–17	3	2ª B	7th	
2017–18	3	2ª B	2nd	Second round
2018–19	3	2ª B	7th	First round
2019–20	3	2ª B	2nd	Second round
2020–21	3	2ª B	9th / 4th	Second round
2021–22	5	3ª RFEF	3rd	
2022–23	5	3ª Fed.	1st	
2023–24	4	2ª Fed.	3rd	First round
2024–25	3	1ª Fed.	15th	Round of 32
2025–26	3	1ª Fed.	18th	
2026–27	4	2ª Fed.		

- 2 seasons in Primera Federación
- 13 seasons in Segunda División B
- 2 seasons in Segunda Federación
- 9 seasons in Tercera División
- 2 seasons in Tercera Federación/Tercera División RFEF

== Current squad ==
As of 4 April 2026

Note: Flags indicate national team as defined under FIFA eligibility rules; some limited exceptions apply. Players may hold more than one non-FIFA nationality.

No.	Pos.	Nation	Player
1	GK	ESP	Manu García
2	DF	ESP	Jorge Álvarez
3	DF	ESP	Álex Martínez
4	DF	ESP	Adri Castellano
5	DF	ESP	Álex Carbonell (on loan from S.C.U. Torreense)
7	FW	GHA	Tahiru Awudu
8	MF	ESP	Eugeni
9	FW	ESP	Víctor Sánchez (on loan from Córdoba)
10	MF	ESP	Álex Gil
11	FW	ESP	Pablo Moreno
13	GK	BUL	David Vassilev
14	FW	ESP	Unai Buján
15	DF	ESP	Gabriel Clemente

No.	Pos.	Nation	Player
16	MF	ESP	Adrián Ruiz (on loan from Cultural Leonesa)
17	FW	BRA	Alexiel (on loan from Santo André)
19	FW	GHA	Ernest Ohemeng
20	FW	ESP	José Cambra
21	DF	ESP	Lluís Llácer
22	DF	ESP	Juan Rodríguez
23	DF	ESP	Alberto Escassi
24	FW	ESP	Dani Selma
25	MF	ESP	Luis Muñoz
30	FW	ARG	Tomi Guzmán
34	GK	COL	Federico Barrios
—	DF	ESP	Lanchi
—	DF	ESP	Marcos Olguín

=== Out on loan ===
Note: Flags indicate national team as defined under FIFA eligibility rules; some limited exceptions apply. Players may hold more than one non-FIFA nationality.

No.	Pos.	Nation	Player
18	FW	CHN	Du Yuezheng (at Chongqing Tonglianglong until 31 December 2026)

== Honours ==
- Tercera División: 2001–02, 2013–14
- Tercera Federación: 2022–23
- Segunda Federación: 2023–24 play-off winners

== Former coaches ==
- (Spain) Juan López Muñiz
- (Spain) Oli
- (Spain) Alfredo Santaelena

== Stadium ==
Marbella's traditional home ground is at Estadio Municipal de Marbella. However, with this stadium being redeveloped, Marbella currently plays its home games at Dama de Noche football ground, a training pitch that has been converted into a very basic stadium by the addition of temporary stands, and has a capacity of around 1,500 spectators. As a result of the basic and limited facilities at Dama De Noche, the local council and football club have been under pressure from the supporters to conclude the restoration of Estadio Municipal de Marbella.

== Affiliated clubs ==
The following club is currently affiliated with Marbella FC:

- (India) Hyderabad FC (2020–present)
