= CD Arenteiro =

Association football club in Spain

Coordinates: 42.424862°N 8.085704°W

Arenteiro
- Full name: Club Deportivo Arenteiro
- Founded: 1958; 68 years ago
- Stadium: Espiñedo
- Capacity: 2,000
- President: Argimiro Marnotes
- Head coach: Juanfran
- League: Tercera Federación – Group 1
- 2025–26: Primera Federación – Group 1, 20th of 20 (relegated; administrative relegation)
- Website: cdarenteiro.es
| Home colours | Away colours |

Club Deportivo Arenteiro is a Spanish football club based in O Carballiño in the autonomous community of Galicia. Founded in 1958, it plays in Tercera Federación – Group 1. Its stadium is Espiñedo with a capacity of 2,000 seats.

Between 1990 and 2005 the club was known as Club Deportivo O Carballiño.

== Season to season ==
| Season | Tier | Division | Place | Copa del Rey |
|---|---|---|---|---|
| 1958–59 | 4 | Serie A | 6th | |
| 1959–60 | 4 | Serie A | 10th | |
| 1960–61 | 4 | Serie A | 7th | |
| 1961–62 | 4 | Serie A | 2nd | |
| 1962–63 | 4 | Serie A | 3rd | |
| 1963–64 | 4 | Serie A | 1st | |
| 1964–65 | 3 | 3ª | 12th | |
| 1965–66 | 3 | 3ª | 11th | |
| 1966–67 | 3 | 3ª | 16th | |
| 1967–68 | 4 | Serie A | 4th | |
| 1968–69 | 4 | Serie A | 13th | |
| 1969–70 | 4 | Serie A | 8th | |
| 1970–71 | 4 | Serie A | 18th | |
| 1971–72 | 4 | Serie A | 11th | |
| 1972–73 | 4 | Serie A | 17th | |
| 1973–74 | 5 | 1ª Reg. | | |
| 1974–75 | 5 | 1ª Reg. | 5th | |
| 1975–76 | 5 | 1ª Reg. | 1st | |
| 1976–77 | 4 | Serie A | 16th | |
| 1977–78 | 5 | Serie A | 4th | |

| Season | Tier | Division | Place | Copa del Rey |
|---|---|---|---|---|
| 1978–79 | 5 | Reg. Pref. | 13th | |
| 1979–80 | 5 | Reg. Pref. | 7th | |
| 1980–81 | 4 | 3ª | 8th | |
| 1981–82 | 4 | 3ª | 14th | |
| 1982–83 | 4 | 3ª | 15th | |
| 1983–84 | 4 | 3ª | 9th | |
| 1984–85 | 4 | 3ª | 6th | |
| 1985–86 | 4 | 3ª | 14th | |
| 1986–87 | 4 | 3ª | 2nd | |
| 1987–88 | 3 | 2ª B | 16th | |
| 1988–89 | 3 | 2ª B | 17th | |
| 1989–90 | 4 | 3ª | 6th | |
| 1990–91 | 4 | 3ª | 10th | |
| 1991–92 | 4 | 3ª | 3rd | |
| 1992–93 | 4 | 3ª | 3rd | |
| 1993–94 | 4 | 3ª | 16th | |
| 1994–95 | 5 | Reg. Pref. | 14th | |
| 1995–96 | 5 | Reg. Pref. | 4th | |
| 1996–97 | 5 | Reg. Pref. | 8th | |
| 1997–98 | 5 | Reg. Pref. | 8th | |

| Season | Tier | Division | Place | Copa del Rey |
|---|---|---|---|---|
| 1998–99 | 5 | Reg. Pref. | 12th | |
| 1999–2000 | 5 | Reg. Pref. | 15th | |
| 2000–01 | 5 | Reg. Pref. | 14th | |
| 2001–02 | 5 | Reg. Pref. | 15th | |
| 2002–03 | 5 | Reg. Pref. | 15th | |
| 2003–04 | 5 | Reg. Pref. | 20th | |
| 2004–05 | 6 | 1ª Reg. | 9th | |
| 2005–06 | 6 | 1ª Reg. | 1st | |
| 2006–07 | 5 | Pref. Aut. | 15th | |
| 2007–08 | 5 | Pref. Aut. | 6th | |
| 2008–09 | 5 | Pref. Aut. | 7th | |
| 2009–10 | 5 | Pref. Aut. | 13th | |
| 2010–11 | 5 | Pref. Aut. | 19th | |
| 2011–12 | 6 | 1ª Aut. | 1st | |
| 2012–13 | 5 | Pref. Aut. | 17th | |
| 2013–14 | 6 | 1ª Aut. | 1st | |
| 2014–15 | 5 | Pref. Aut. | 12th | |
| 2015–16 | 5 | Pref. | 7th | |
| 2016–17 | 5 | Pref. | 3rd | |
| 2017–18 | 4 | 3ª | 14th | |

| Season | Tier | Division | Place | Copa del Rey |
|---|---|---|---|---|
| 2018–19 | 4 | 3ª | 13th | |
| 2019–20 | 4 | 3ª | 9th | |
| 2020–21 | 4 | 3ª | 1st / 1st | |
| 2021–22 | 4 | 2ª RFEF | 10th | Second round |
| 2022–23 | 4 | 2ª Fed. | 1st | Second round |
| 2023–24 | 3 | 1ª Fed. | 8th | Second round |
| 2024–25 | 3 | 1ª Fed. | 12th | |
| 2025–26 | 3 | 1ª Fed. | 20th | |
| 2026–27 | 5 | 3ª Fed. | | |

- 3 seasons in Primera Federación
- 2 seasons in Segunda División B
- 2 seasons in Segunda Federación/Segunda División RFEF
- 19 seasons in Tercera División
- 1 season in Tercera Federación

== Players ==
As of 3 February 2026

Note: Flags indicate national team as defined under FIFA eligibility rules; some limited exceptions apply. Players may hold more than one non-FIFA nationality.

| No. | Pos. | Nation | Player |
|---|---|---|---|
| 1 | GK | ESP | Alvin Abajas (on loan from Leganés) |
| 2 | DF | ESP | Pablo Moyá (on loan from Cartagena) |
| 3 | DF | ESP | Luca Lohr (on loan from Cartagena) |
| 4 | DF | ESP | Eliseo Falcón |
| 5 | DF | ESP | Gorka Pérez |
| 6 | MF | ESP | Brais Val |
| 7 | FW | ESP | David Ferreiro |
| 8 | MF | ESP | Dani González |
| 9 | FW | ESP | Nacho Ramón |
| 10 | MF | ESP | Chuca |
| 11 | FW | BOL | Jaume Cuéllar |
| 13 | GK | ESP | Diego García |

| No. | Pos. | Nation | Player |
|---|---|---|---|
| 14 | MF | GNB | Adilson |
| 15 | DF | ESP | Diego Moreno |
| 16 | DF | ESP | Daniel Lasure |
| 17 | FW | ESP | Antonio Molina |
| 18 | FW | ESP | Víctor Mingo |
| 19 | DF | ESP | Alpha |
| 21 | MF | ESP | Álex López |
| 22 | DF | ESP | Jordan Sánchez |
| 23 | FW | ESP | Bilal Kandoussi |
| 25 | MF | ESP | Álvaro Bastida |
| — | FW | GAM | Babucarr Boye |

=== Out on loan ===
Note: Flags indicate national team as defined under FIFA eligibility rules; some limited exceptions apply. Players may hold more than one non-FIFA nationality.

| No. | Pos. | Nation | Player |
|---|---|---|---|
| — | DF | ARG | Tomás Berardozzi (at Sarriana until 30 June 2026) |
