= Ourense CF =

Association football club in Spain

Coordinates: 42.340786°N 7.875795°W

Puente
- Full name: Puente Club de Fútbol, S.A.D.
- Nickname: Puente
- Founded: 1977; 49 years ago as (Puente Ourense Club de Fútbol)
- Stadium: Campo de Oira
- Capacity: 5,659
- President: Camilo Díaz
- Head coach: Dani Llácer
- League: Segunda Federación – Group 1
- 2025–26: Primera Federación – Group 1, 17th of 20 (relegated)
- Website: www.ourensecf.es
Home colours	Away colours

Ourense Club de Fútbol, S.A.D. is a Spanish football club from the city of Ourense, Galicia. It was founded in 1977 as Puente Ourense Club de Fútbol, and changed its name in 2014, after the dissolution of CD Ourense, and currently plays in Segunda Federación – Group 1, holding home games at Estadio O Couto, which has a capacity of 5,659 spectators.

== History ==
The 1993–94 season has been the most successful in the history of the club as it achieved its major aim - promotion to the Tercera División thus becoming the only team in the province in this category. The club was founded as Puente Ourense CF before being renamed to Ponte Ourense CF in 1997, and to the current name in 2014. On 21 May 2022, Ourense were promoted to Segunda División RFEF after beating Llerenense 4–0 in the promotion playoffs.

=== Club names ===
- Puente Ourense Club de Fútbol - (1977–97)
- Ponte Ourense Club de Fútbol - (1997–2014)
- Ourense Club de Fútbol - (2014–)

== Season to season ==
Season	Tier	Division	Place	Copa del Rey
1977–78	8	3ª Reg.	1st	
1978–79	7	2ª Reg.	1st	
1979–80	DNP			
1980–81	8	3ª Reg.	8th	
1981–82	7	2ª Reg.	11th	
1982–83	6	1ª Reg.	10th	
1983–84	6	1ª Reg.	15th	
1984–85	6	1ª Reg.	4th	
1985–86	6	1ª Reg.	14th	
1986–87	6	1ª Reg.	18th	
1987–88	6	1ª Reg.	4th	
1988–89	6	1ª Reg.	8th	
1989–90	6	1ª Reg.	16th	
1990–91	7	2ª Reg.	10th	
1991–92	7	2ª Reg.	1st	
1992–93	6	1ª Reg.	14th	
1993–94	5	Reg. Pref.	1st	
1994–95	4	3ª	9th	
1995–96	4	3ª	2nd	
1996–97	4	3ª	2nd	

Season	Tier	Division	Place	Copa del Rey
1997–98	4	3ª	5th	
1998–99	4	3ª	7th	
1999–2000	4	3ª	15th	
2000–01	4	3ª	3rd	
2001–02	4	3ª	11th	
2002–03	4	3ª	8th	
2003–04	4	3ª	18th	
2004–05	5	Reg. Pref.	3rd	
2005–06	5	Reg. Pref.	14th	
2006–07	5	Pref. Aut.	4th	
2007–08	5	Pref. Aut.	3rd	
2008–09	5	Pref. Aut.	19th	
2009–10	6	1ª Aut.	6th	
2010–11	6	1ª Aut.	7th	
2011–12	6	1ª Aut.	7th	
2012–13	5	Pref. Aut.	20th	
2013–14	6	1ª Aut.	7th	
2014–15	6	1ª Aut.	3rd	
2015–16	5	Pref.	8th	
2016–17	5	Pref.	2nd	

Season	Tier	Division	Place	Copa del Rey
2017–18	4	3ª	9th	
2018–19	4	3ª	6th	
2019–20	4	3ª	2nd	
2020–21	4	3ª	8th / 3rd	First round
2021–22	5	3ª RFEF	2nd	
2022–23	4	2ª Fed.	13th	
2023–24	4	2ª Fed.	1st	
2024–25	3	1ª Fed.	10th	Round of 16
2025–26	3	1ª Fed.	17th	Round of 32
2026–27	4	2ª Fed.		

- 2 seasons in Primera Federación
- 3 seasons in Segunda Federación
- 14 seasons in Tercera División
- 1 season in Tercera Federación/Tercera División RFEF

== Players ==
=== Current squad ===
As of 10 September 2026

Note: Flags indicate national team as defined under FIFA eligibility rules; some limited exceptions apply. Players may hold more than one non-FIFA nationality.

No.	Pos.	Nation	Player
1	GK	ESP	Román Noya
2	DF	ESP	Iván Tomás
3	DF	ESP	Iván Muñoz
4	DF	ESP	Manu Buide (on loan from Lugo B)
5	DF	ESP	Víctor Algisí
6	MF	ARG	Facundo Ballardo
7	FW	ESP	Aarón Delgado
8	MF	ESP	Meli
9	FW	ESP	Viti Oliver
10	FW	ESP	Marquitos
11	DF	ESP	Jorge Domingo
12	DF	ESP	Miguel Cera

No.	Pos.	Nation	Player
13	GK	ESP	Diego García
14	MF	ESP	Jesús Cambil
15	DF	COL	Simón Brainsky
17	DF	ESP	Pablo Ramírez
18	MF	GEQ	Robustiano Ndong
19	FW	GHA	Ihab Nurudeen
20	MF	GHA	Peter Bomwinsum
21	DF	ESP	Mario Jorrín
22	FW	ESP	Brais Penela
23	MF	ESP	Iker Punzano
24	MF	ESP	Manu de la Fuente
