= 2015–16 Copa del Rey =

Copa del Rey
114th Copa del Rey

Tournament details
- Country: Spain
- Date: 2 September 2015 – 22 May 2016
- Teams: 83

Final positions
- Champions: Barcelona (28th title)
- Runners-up: Sevilla

Tournament statistics
- Matches played: 111
- Goals scored: 319 (2.87 per match)
- Top goal scorer(s): John Guidetti; Lionel Messi; Munir; Álvaro Negredo; Luis Suárez (5 goals each)

The 2015–16 Copa del Rey was the 114th staging of the Copa del Rey (including two seasons where two rival editions were played). Going into the tournament, the winners were assured a place for the 2016–17 UEFA Europa League Group stage. However, since the two finalists, Barcelona and Sevilla, both qualified for the 2016–17 UEFA Champions League, respectively by winning the 2015–16 La Liga title and the 2015–16 Europa League, the cup winner's place in the 2016–17 Europa League group stage instead passed to the fifth-place team in La Liga, Athletic Bilbao.

Barcelona entered as the defending champions after winning the 2014–15 edition. They defeated Sevilla 2–0 in the final, winning their 28th title.

== Schedule and format ==
Round	Draw date	Date	Fixtures	Clubs	Format details
First round	21 July 2015	2 September 2015	18	83 → 65	New entries: Clubs participating in Tercera and Segunda División B gained entry. Byes: Six teams from Segunda División B (Barakaldo, UCAM Murcia, Villanovense, Racing Ferrol, UD Logroñés and Huracán Valencia) received a bye. Opponents seeding: Teams faced each other according to proximity criteria. Local team seeding: Draw of lots. Knock-out tournament type: Single match Copa Federación qualification: losers qualified for 2015–16 Copa Federación, National phase.
Second round	21 July 2015	9 September 2015	22	65 → 43	New entries: Clubs participating in Segunda División gained entry. Byes: One Segunda División team (Zaragoza) received a bye. Opponents seeding: Segunda División teams faced each other. Local team seeding: Draw of lots. Knock-out tournament type: Single match
Third round	18 September 2015	14 October 2015	11	43 → 32	Byes: One team from Segunda División B or Tercera División or a team from Segunda División, which previously didn't receive a bye (Huesca), received one. Opponents seeding: Segunda División teams faced each other. Local team seeding: Draw of lots. Knock-out tournament type: Single match
Round of 32	16 October 2015	2 December 2015	16	32 → 16	New entries: Clubs participating in La Liga gained entry. Opponents seeding: The seven teams from La Liga which qualified for 2015–16 UEFA competitions, faced the remaining seven teams from Segunda División B and Tercera División. The five Segunda División teams played against La Liga teams. The eight remaining La Liga teams faced each other. Local team seeding: First leg at home of team in lower division. Knock-out tournament type: Double match
Round of 32	16 October 2015	16 December 2015	16	32 → 16	New entries: Clubs participating in La Liga gained entry. Opponents seeding: The seven teams from La Liga which qualified for 2015–16 UEFA competitions, faced the remaining seven teams from Segunda División B and Tercera División. The five Segunda División teams played against La Liga teams. The eight remaining La Liga teams faced each other. Local team seeding: First leg at home of team in lower division. Knock-out tournament type: Double match
Round of 16	18 December 2015	6 January 2016	8	16 → 8	Opponents seeding: First leg at home for the team in the lower division. Local team seeding: First leg at home of the team in the lower division. Knock-out tournament type: Double match
Round of 16	18 December 2015	13 January 2016	8	16 → 8	Opponents seeding: First leg at home for the team in the lower division. Local team seeding: First leg at home of the team in the lower division. Knock-out tournament type: Double match
Quarter-finals	15 January 2016	20 January 2016	4	8 → 4	Opponents seeding: Draw of lots. Local team seeding: Luck of the draw. Knock-out tournament type: Double match
Quarter-finals	15 January 2016	27 January 2016	4	8 → 4	Opponents seeding: Draw of lots. Local team seeding: Luck of the draw. Knock-out tournament type: Double match
Semifinals	29 January 2016	3 February 2016	2	4 → 2	Opponents seeding: Draw of lots. Local team seeding: Luck of the draw. Knock-out tournament type: Double match
Semifinals	29 January 2016	10 February 2016	2	4 → 2	Opponents seeding: Draw of lots. Local team seeding: Luck of the draw. Knock-out tournament type: Double match
Final	29 January 2016	22 May 2016	1	2 → 1	Single match, stadium TBD by RFEF. UEFA Europa League qualification: winners qualified for 2016–17 UEFA Europa League group stage.

Notes

- Double-match rounds enforced away goals rule, single-match rounds did not.
- Games ending in a tie were decided in extra time; and if it persisted, by a penalty shoot-out.
- UEFA Europa League qualification: since the Cup winners, Barcelona, qualified for the 2016–17 UEFA Champions League, the 5th and 6th ranked teams in 2015–16 La Liga (always excluding no "UEFA licence" and banned clubs), Athletic Bilbao and Celta Vigo, qualified for the Europa League group stage and play-off round respectively.

== Qualified teams ==
The following teams competed in the 2015–16 Copa del Rey.

Twenty teams of 2014–15 La Liga:

- Almería
- Athletic Bilbao
- Atlético Madrid
- Barcelona
- Celta Vigo
- Córdoba
- Deportivo La Coruña
- Eibar
- Elche
- Espanyol
- Getafe
- Granada
- Levante
- Málaga
- Rayo Vallecano
- Real Madrid
- Real Sociedad
- Sevilla
- Valencia
- Villarreal

21 teams of 2014–15 Segunda División (Barcelona B was excluded for being a reserve team):

- Alavés
- Albacete
- Alcorcón
- Girona
- Jaén
- Las Palmas
- Leganés
- Llagostera
- Lugo
- Mallorca
- Mirandés
- Numancia
- Osasuna
- Ponferradina
- Racing Santander
- Real Betis
- Sabadell
- Sporting Gijón
- Valladolid
- Tenerife
- Zaragoza

24 teams of 2014–15 Segunda División B: the top five teams of each of the four groups (excluding reserve teams) and the four with the highest number of points out of the remaining non-reserve teams:

- Barakaldo
- Cádiz
- Compostela
- Cultural Leonesa
- Gimnàstic Tarragona
- Guijuelo
- Guadalajara
- Hércules
- Huesca
- Huracán Valencia
- Linense
- Lleida Esportiu
- Melilla
- Murcia
- Oviedo
- Racing Ferrol
- Real Unión
- Reus
- Tudelano
- UCAM Murcia
- UD Logroñés
- Villanovense

Eighteen teams of 2014–15 Tercera División, champions of each one of the eighteen groups (or at least the ones with the highest number of points within their group since reserve teams were excluded):

- Algeciras
- Arandina
- Ascó
- Castellón
- Condal
- Ebro
- Formentera
- Jumilla
- Laredo
- Linares
- Mensajero
- Mérida
- Peña Sport
- Pontevedra
- Portugalete
- Rayo Majadahonda
- Talavera de la Reina
- Varea

== First round ==
The draw for First and Second round was held on 21 July 2015 at 13:00 CEST in La Ciudad del Fútbol, RFEF headquarters, in Las Rozas, Madrid. In this round, 37 teams from 2015–16 Segunda División B and 5 from 2015–16 Tercera División teams gained entry. In the draw, firstly six teams from Segunda División B received a bye and then, the remaining teams in the league and teams from Tercera División faced according to proximity criteria by next groups:

Pot 1 Group 1	Pot 2 Group 2	Pot 3 Group 3	Pot 4 Group 4
Segunda División B: Arandina; Cultural Leonesa; Compostela; Guijuelo; Peña Sport; Pontevedra; Racing Ferrol; Racing Santander; Tudelano; UD Logroñés Tercera División: Condal; Laredo; Varea	Segunda División B: Barakaldo; Ebro; Guadalajara; Mensajero; Portugalete; Rayo Majadahonda; Real Unión; Socuéllamos; Talavera de la Reina	Segunda División B: Alcoyano; Hércules; Huracán Valencia; Lleida; Reus; Sabadell Tercera División: Ascó; Castellón; Formentera	Segunda División B: Algeciras; Cádiz; Jumilla; Linares; Linense; Melilla; Mérida; Murcia; Recreativo; UCAM Murcia; Villanovense

- Barakaldo, UCAM Murcia, Villanovense, Racing Ferrol, UD Logroñés and Huracán Valencia received a bye for the second round.

27 August 2015	Mérida	0–3	Peña Sport	Mérida
21:00 CEST (UTC+02:00)			Etxeberría 26', 73'; Manjón 90+2'	Stadium: Romano; Referee: Juan Bustos

2 September 2015	Tudelano	3–2	Compostela	Tudela
17:30 CEST (UTC+02:00)	Arkaitz 32' (pen.), 56'; Azpilicueta 67'		S. Sánchez 23', 90'	Stadium: Ciudad de Tudela; Referee: Álvarez Fernández

2 September 2015	Mensajero	2–0	Rayo Majadahonda	Santa Cruz de La Palma
18:00 CEST (UTC+02:00)	Yeray 52'; Salvá 86'			Stadium: Silvestre Carrillo; Referee: Varón Aceitón

2 September 2015	Condal	1–4 (a.e.t.)	Arandina	Noreña
18:30 CEST (UTC+02:00)	Aitor Hervás 18' (pen.)		Franch 83'; Adeva 109'; Ruba 113'; M. Rodríguez 118' (pen.)	Stadium: Alejandro Ortea; Referee: Javier Iglesias Villanueva

2 September 2015	Ebro	2–2 (a.e.t.) (4–3 p)	Real Unión	Zaragoza
18:30 CEST (UTC+02:00)	Carralero 2'; Kevin 77'		Mújica 41'; Domínguez 74'	Stadium: La Almozara; Referee: Fernández Pérez
	Penalties
	Kevin (penalty scored); Tierno (penalty scored); Carralero (penalty missed); Sergio (penalty scored); Lafita (penalty scored)		Domínguez (penalty scored); Galán (penalty scored); Aimar (penalty missed); Alonso (penalty scored); Esnaola (penalty missed)

2 September 2015	Varea	2–3	Cultural Leonesa	Logroño
19:00 CEST (UTC+02:00)	Torres 29'; Pinilla 49'		Tejedor 39'; Babalola 51'; Aketxe 71' (pen.)	Stadium: Municipal; Referee: López Parra

2 September 2015	Laredo	2–0	Racing Santander	Laredo
20:00 CEST (UTC+02:00)	César 13' (o.g.); Kamal 41' (o.g.)			Stadium: San Lorenzo; Referee: Ramos Domínguez

2 September 2015	Guadalajara	0–2	Talavera de la Reina	Guadalajara
20:00 CEST (UTC+02:00)			Perales 56'; Valdivia 90'	Stadium: Pedro Escartín; Referee: Jiménez González

2 September 2015	Sabadell	1–1 (a.e.t.) (2–4 p)	Castellón	Sabadell
20:00 CEST (UTC+02:00)	M. Fernández 10'		Lolo 66'	Stadium: Nova Creu Alta; Attendance: 1,772; Referee: Cristian Lixandru
	Penalties
	Agustín (penalty missed); Pirulo (penalty scored); Forgàs (penalty scored); Agus (penalty missed)		Suárez (penalty scored); Lolo (penalty scored); Castells (penalty scored); Meseguer (penalty scored)

2 September 2015	Guijuelo	1–0	Pontevedra	Guijuelo
20:30 CEST (UTC+02:00)	Milla 58'			Stadium: Municipal; Referee: Villoria Linacero

2 September 2015	Alcoyano	1–2	Formentera	Alcoy
20:30 CEST (UTC+02:00)	Mongil 32'		Martí 70'; Romero 72'	Stadium: El Collao; Referee: Sánchez Villalobos

2 September 2015	Reus	2–0	Ascó	Reus
20:30 CEST (UTC+02:00)	Á. Martínez 57'; Jaume 87'			Stadium: Camp Nou Municipal; Referee: Lax Franco

2 September 2015	Socuéllamos	2–1	Portugalete	Socuéllamos
21:00 CEST (UTC+02:00)	J. Gómez 24'; C. García 72'		Galán 34'	Stadium: Paquito Jiménez; Referee: Peña Varela

2 September 2015	Lleida Esportiu	3–1	Hércules	Lleida
21:00 CEST (UTC+02:00)	Colinas 16'; M. Martínez 26'; Rubio 80'		Ruane 77'	Stadium: Camp d'Esports; Referee: Galech Azpetegia

2 September 2015	Linense	1–0	Recreativo	La Linea de la Concepción
21:00 CEST (UTC+02:00)	Espinar 85'			Stadium: Municipal; Referee: Fernández Fernández

2 September 2015	Murcia	0–1	Cádiz	Murcia
21:00 CEST (UTC+02:00)			Hugo 34'	Stadium: Nueva Condomina; Referee: Gil Coscolla

2 September 2015	Linares	2–1	Jumilla	Linares
21:00 CEST (UTC+02:00)	Payán 25', 75'		Etamané 32'	Stadium: Linarejos; Referee: Muñoz Mayordomo

2 September 2015	Melilla	0–1	Algeciras	Melilla
21:30 CEST (UTC+02:00)			Medina 81'	Stadium: Álvarez Claro; Referee: Díaz de Mera Escuderos

== Second round ==
In the second round teams from Segunda División played among themselves and teams from Segunda División B and Tercera played separately. Zaragoza received a bye for the third round.

9 September 2015	Mensajero	0–1 (a.e.t.)	Cádiz	Santa Cruz de La Palma
17:00 CEST (UTC+02:00)			Servando 105+1'	Stadium: Silvestre Carrillo; Attendance: 1,000; Referee: Silvestre Carrillo

9 September 2015	Ebro	1–0 (a.e.t.)	Tudelano	Zaragoza
18:00 CEST (UTC+02:00)	García 120+2'			Stadium: La Almozara; Attendance: 1,300; Referee: Rebollo López

9 September 2015	Huracán Valencia	2–0	Socuéllamos	Torrent
19:30 CEST (UTC+02:00)	Cubillas 47'; Ariday 81'			Stadium: San Gregorio; Attendance: 1,500; Referee: Ripoll Solano

9 September 2015	Laredo	3–1	Cultural Leonesa	Laredo
20:00 CEST (UTC+02:00)	Vélez 33'; Bubu 88' (pen.); Ortiz 90+1'		Matador 39'	Stadium: San Lorenzo; Attendance: 1,300; Referee: Fernández Pérez

9 September 2015	Almería	3–3 (a.e.t.) (4–3 p)	Elche	Almería
20:00 CEST (UTC+02:00)	Soriano 24'; Herrera 69', 93'		Nono 67'; León 75' (pen.); Liberto 111'	Stadium: Mediterráneo; Attendance: 5,895; Referee: Trujillo Suárez
	Penalties
	I. Sánchez (penalty missed); Morcillo (penalty scored); Puertas (penalty scored); Herrera (penalty scored); José Ángel (penalty scored)		Ilie (penalty scored); León (penalty scored); Nono (penalty missed); Espinosa (penalty missed); Álvaro (penalty scored)

9 September 2015	Barakaldo	3–1	Formentera	Barakaldo
20:15 CEST (UTC+02:00)	Quintanilla 1'; Alain 8', 51'		Pepe 8' (pen.)	Stadium: Lasesarre; Attendance: 1,100; Referee: Leo Ollo

9 September 2015	UCAM Murcia	2–1	Algeciras	Murcia
20:30 CEST (UTC+02:00)	Higinio 25'; Pallarès 67'		Santi 30'	Stadium: La Condomina; Attendance: 1,500; Referee: Carbonell Hernández

9 September 2015	Lleida Esportiu	2–0	Guijuelo	Lleida
20:30 CEST (UTC+02:00)	M. Martínez 50' (pen.); Colinas 87'			Stadium: Camp d'Esports; Attendance: 650; Referee: Hernández Lorenzo

9 September 2015	Arandina	2–4	Reus	Aranda de Duero
20:30 CEST (UTC+02:00)	Franch 14'; Adeva 90+2'		Vaz 25'; Folch 51'; Haro 65'; Fernando 90+3'	Stadium: El Montecillo; Attendance: 1,000; Referee: López Toca

9 September 2015	Gimnàstic	2–2 (a.e.t.) (5–4 p)	Girona	Tarragona
20:30 CEST (UTC+02:00)	Palanca 44', 89'		Jairo 71'; Marcelo 90+3'	Stadium: Nou Estadi; Attendance: 2,748; Referee: Ocón Arráiz
	Penalties
	Marcos (penalty scored); Emaná (penalty scored); Tejera (penalty scored); Rocha (penalty scored); Palanca (penalty scored)		Jairo (penalty scored); Álamo (penalty scored); Marcelo (penalty missed); Clerc (penalty scored); Sanchón (penalty scored)

9 September 2015	Leganés	2–0	Tenerife	Leganés
20:30 CEST (UTC+02:00)	Ramos 73'; Szymanowski 90'			Stadium: Butarque; Attendance: 3,334; Referee: Ruipérez Marín

9 September 2015	Córdoba	0–1	Lugo	Córdoba
20:30 CEST (UTC+02:00)			Joselu (born 1991) 47'	Stadium: Nuevo Arcángel; Attendance: 11,853; Referee: Pizarro Gómez

9 September 2015	Mirandés	1–2†	Osasuna	Miranda de Ebro
20:30 CEST (UTC+02:00)	Salinas 52'		Olavide 16'; Mesa 26'	Stadium: Anduva; Attendance: 3,369; Referee: Eiriz Mata
Note: Osasuna eliminated by improper alignment.

9 September 2015	Llagostera	2–1 (a.e.t.)	Albacete	Palamós
20:30 CEST (UTC+02:00)	Mosquito 23'; Benja 104'		Díaz 64'	Stadium: Palamós Costa Brava; Attendance: 812; Referee: Ais Reig

9 September 2015	Alcorcón	0–1	Ponferradina	Alcorcón
20:30 CEST (UTC+02:00)			Casado 24'	Stadium: Santo Domingo; Attendance: 1,886; Referee: González Fuertes

9 September 2015	Numancia	0–1	Alavés	Soria
20:30 CEST (UTC+02:00)			Barreiro 84'	Stadium: Los Pajaritos; Attendance: 2,428; Referee: Alberola Rojas

9 September 2015	Talavera de la Reina	0–2	Linense	Talavera de la Reina
20:45 CEST (UTC+02:00)			Zamorano 36'; Mauri 68'	Stadium: El Prado; Attendance: 2,050; Referee: Vicente Moral

9 September 2015	UD Logroñés	2–1	Linares	Logroño
20:45 CEST (UTC+02:00)	Muneta 19'; Ba 68'		Ferrón 77'	Stadium: Las Gaunas; Attendance: 2,058; Referee: Rezola Etxeberria

9 September 2015	Racing Ferrol	1–0	Castellón	Ferrol
20:45 CEST (UTC+02:00)	Joselu (born 1987) 72'			Stadium: A Malata; Attendance: 500; Referee: Carbajales Gómez

9 September 2015	Villanovense	3–2	Peña Sport	Villanueva de la Serena
21:00 CEST (UTC+02:00)	Casi 16', 48', 69'		Manjón 62'; J. Rodríguez 87'	Stadium: Romero Cuerda; Attendance: 1,200; Referee: Caucelo Sace

9 September 2015	Oviedo	2–1	Valladolid	Oviedo
22:00 CEST (UTC+02:00)	Toché 52' (pen.); Hervías 55'		Alfaro 72'	Stadium: Carlos Tartiere; Attendance: 3,000; Referee: Sagués Oscoz

10 September 2015	Mallorca	0–2	Huesca	Palma
20:00 CEST (UTC+02:00)			Tyronne 54'; Mérida 74'	Stadium: Iberostar Estadi; Attendance: 3,715; Referee: Medié Jiménez

== Third round ==
- Huesca received a bye for the Round of 32.

14 October 2015	Barakaldo	1–0	Huracán Valencia	Barakaldo
20:30 CEST (UTC+02:00)	Arroyo 17'			Stadium: Lasesarre; Attendance: 6,000; Referee: Álvarez Borbolla

14 October 2015	Reus	2–1 (a.e.t.)	Lleida Esportiu	Reus
20:30 CEST (UTC+02:00)	Vítor 7'; Edgar 97'		Ekhi 23'	Stadium: Camp Nou Municipal; Attendance: 1,000; Referee: Bosch Domenech

14 October 2015	Cádiz	1–0	Laredo	Cádiz
20:30 CEST (UTC+02:00)	Salvi 90'			Stadium: Ramón de Carranza; Attendance: 9,979; Referee: Escudero Marín

14 October 2015	Leganés	3–1	Alavés	Leganés
20:30 CEST (UTC+02:00)	Gabriel 6'; Ruiz de Galarreta 13'; Peña 63'		Laguardia 65'	Stadium: Butarque; Attendance: 3,613; Referee: Pérez Pallás

14 October 2015	Almería	2–1	Gimnàstic	Almería
20:30 CEST (UTC+02:00)	Soriano 14'; Quique 75'		A. López 90'	Stadium: Mediterráneo; Attendance: 4,328; Referee: Valdés Aller

14 October 2015	Oviedo	2–3 (a.e.t.)	Mirandés	Oviedo
20:30 CEST (UTC+02:00)	Koné 72'; Verdés 88'		Abdón 4', 69', 104'	Stadium: Carlos Tartiere; Attendance: 6,000; Referee: Figueroa Vázquez

14 October 2015	UD Logroñés	2–2 (a.e.t.) (5–4 p)	UCAM Murcia	Logroño
20:45 CEST (UTC+02:00)	C. Fernández 45'; Titi 62'		Pallarès 66'; Góngora 84'	Stadium: Las Gaunas; Attendance: 2,534; Referee: Villa Sánchez
	Penalties
	Á. González (penalty scored); Rico (penalty scored); Alegre (penalty scored); León (penalty scored); Santos (penalty scored)		Góngora (penalty scored); Rubio (penalty missed); Remón (penalty scored); D. Pérez (penalty scored); Aguilar (penalty scored)

14 October 2015	Linense	2–0	Ebro	La Línea de la Concepción
21:00 CEST (UTC+02:00)	Mauri 2'; Zamorano 43'			Stadium: Municipal; Attendance: 4,000; Referee: Conejero Sánchez

14 October 2015	Villanovense	2–1	Racing Ferrol	Villanueva de la Serena
21:00 CEST (UTC+02:00)	Elías 26', 90' (pen.)		Nano 15'	Stadium: Romero Cuerda; Attendance: 2,700; Referee: Chavet García

15 October 2015	Ponferradina	1–0 (a.e.t.)	Lugo	Ponferrada
20:30 CEST (UTC+02:00)	Yuri 105'			Stadium: El Toralín; Attendance: 4,390; Referee: Areces Franco

15 October 2015	Zaragoza	1–2	Llagostera	Zaragoza
20:30 CEST (UTC+02:00)	Ángel 43'		Benja 13'; Olaortua 90' (o.g.)	Stadium: La Romareda; Attendance: 9,714; Referee: Piñeiro Crespo

== Final phase ==
The draw for the Round of 32 was held on October 16, 2015, in La Ciudad del Fútbol. In this round, all La Liga teams entered the competition.

Round of 32 pairings were as follows: the seven remaining teams participating in Segunda División B faced the La Liga teams which qualified for European competitions. The five remaining teams participating in Segunda División faced five La Liga teams which did not qualify for European competitions. The remaining eight La Liga teams faced each other. In matches involving teams from different league tiers, the team in the lower tier played the first leg at home. This rule was also applied in the Round of 16, but not for the Quarter-finals and Semi-finals, in which the order of legs was based on the luck of the draw.

Pot 1 Segunda División B	Pot 2 European competitions	Pot 3 Segunda División	Pot 4 Rest of Primera División
Barakaldo; Cádiz; Huesca; Linense; Reus; Villanovense; UD Logroñés	Barcelona (TH); Real Madrid; Atlético Madrid; Valencia; Sevilla; Athletic Bilbao; Villarreal	Almería; Leganés; Llagostera; Mirandés; Ponferradina	Real Betis; Celta Vigo; Deportivo La Coruña; Eibar; Espanyol; Getafe; Granada; Las Palmas; Levante; Málaga; Rayo Vallecano; Real Sociedad; Sporting Gijón

=== Bracket ===
Round of 32
Linense	0	0	0
Athletic Bilbao	2	6	8
Huesca	3	0	3
Villarreal	2	2	4
Villanovense	0	1	1
Barcelona	0	6	6
Levante	1	1	2
Espanyol	1	2	3
Barakaldo	1	0	1
Valencia	1	2	3
Leganés	2	0	2
Granada (a)	1	1	2
Ponferradina	3	0	3
Eibar	0	4	4
Las Palmas	2	1	3
Real Sociedad	1	1	2
Real Betis	2	3	5
Sporting Gijón	0	3	3
UD Logroñés	0	0	0
Sevilla	3	2	5
Mirandés	2	1	3
Málaga	1	0	1
Llagostera	1	1	2
Deportivo La Coruña	2	1	3
Cádiz	1	w/o	—
Real Madrid	3	–	—
Almería	1	0	1
Celta Vigo	3	1	4
Rayo Vallecano (a)	2	1	3
Getafe	0	3	3
Reus	1	0	1
Atlético Madrid	2	1	3

Round of 16
Athletic Bilbao	3	1	4
Villarreal	2	0	2
Barcelona	4	2	6
Espanyol	1	0	1
Valencia	4	3	7
Granada	0	0	0
Eibar	2	2	4
Las Palmas	3	3	6
Real Betis	0	0	0
Sevilla	2	4	6
Mirandés	1	3	4
Deportivo La Coruña	1	0	1
Cádiz	0	0	0
Celta Vigo	3	2	5
Rayo Vallecano	1	0	1
Atlético Madrid	1	3	4

Quarter-finals
Athletic Bilbao	1	1	2
Barcelona	2	3	5
Valencia	1	1	2
Las Palmas	1	0	1
Sevilla	2	3	5
Mirandés	0	0	0
Celta Vigo	0	3	3
Atlético Madrid	0	2	2

Semi-finals
Barcelona	7	1	8
Valencia	0	1	1
Sevilla	4	2	6
Celta Vigo	0	2	2

Final
Barcelona	2
Sevilla	0

== Round of 32 ==
Team 1	Agg.	Team 2	1st leg	2nd leg
Villanovense	1–6	Barcelona	0–0	1–6
Reus	1–3	Atlético Madrid	1–2	0–1
Leganés	2–2 (a)	Granada	2–1	0–1
Rayo Vallecano	(a) 3–3	Getafe	2–0	1–3
Barakaldo	1–5	Valencia	1–3	0–2
UD Logroñés	0–5	Sevilla	0–3	0–2
Almería	1–4	Celta Vigo	1–3	0–1
Llagostera	2–3	Deportivo La Coruña	1–2	1–1
Real Betis	5–3	Sporting Gijón	2–0	3–3
Cádiz	–	Real Madrid	1–3	w/o
Linense	0–8	Athletic Bilbao	0–2	0–6
Huesca	3–4	Villarreal	3–2	0–2
Mirandés	3–1	Málaga	2–1	1–0
Levante	2–3	Espanyol	1–1	1–2
Ponferradina	3–4	Eibar	3–0	0–4
Las Palmas	3–2	Real Sociedad	2–1	1–1

=== First leg ===
28 October 2015	Villanovense	0–0	Barcelona	Villanueva de la Serena
20:30 CET (UTC+01:00)		Report		Stadium: Romero Cuerda; Attendance: 10,600; Referee: Prieto Iglesias

1 December 2015	Reus	1–2	Atlético Madrid	Reus
20:00 CET (UTC+01:00)	Carbià 30'	Report	Vietto 36'; Saúl 63'	Stadium: Camp Nou Municipal; Attendance: 4,222; Referee: Fernández Borbalán

1 December 2015	Leganés	2–1	Granada	Leganés
21:00 CET (UTC+01:00)	Guillermo 10'; Omar 38'	Report	Fran Rico 74'	Stadium: Butarque; Attendance: 3,425; Referee: Clos Gómez

2 December 2015	Rayo Vallecano	2–0	Getafe	Madrid
21:00 CET (UTC+01:00)	Bangoura 6'; Ebert 28'	Report		Stadium: Vallecas; Attendance: 7,262; Referee: Melero López

2 December 2015	Barakaldo	1–3	Valencia	Barakaldo
21:00 CET (UTC+01:00)	Arroyo 16'	Report	Cancelo 19'; Gayà 65'; Parejo 90+1' (pen.)	Stadium: Lasesarre; Attendance: 5,340; Referee: Undiano Mallenco

2 December 2015	UD Logroñés	0–3	Sevilla	Logroño
21:00 CET (UTC+01:00)		Report	Coke 12'; Krohn-Dehli 37'; Immobile 57'	Stadium: Las Gaunas; Attendance: 5,314; Referee: Hernández Hernández

2 December 2015	Almería	1–3	Celta Vigo	Almería
21:00 CET (UTC+01:00)	Pozo 44'	Report	Aspas 16', 35'; Guidetti 74'	Stadium: Mediterráneo; Attendance: 3,862; Referee: Gil Manzano

2 December 2015	Llagostera	1–2	Deportivo La Coruña	Palamós
21:00 CET (UTC+01:00)	Juanjo 22'	Report	Cartabia 61'; Riera 74'	Stadium: Palamós Costa Brava; Attendance: 1,806; Referee: Juan Martínez Munuera

2 December 2015	Real Betis	2–0	Sporting Gijón	Seville
21:00 CET (UTC+01:00)	Vadillo 47'; Vargas 90+3'	Report		Stadium: Benito Villamarín; Attendance: 21,036; Referee: Bikandi Garrido

2 December 2015	Cádiz	1–3	Real Madrid	Cádiz
22:00 CET (UTC+01:00)	Kike Márquez 88'	Report	Cheryshev 3'; Isco 65', 74'	Stadium: Ramón de Carranza; Attendance: 17,224; Referee: Ricardo de Burgos Bengoetxea

3 December 2015	Linense	0–2	Athletic Bilbao	La Linea de la Concepción
20:00 CET (UTC+01:00)		Report	Sola 13'; Laporte 19'	Stadium: Municipal; Attendance: 9,000; Referee: Velasco Carballo

3 December 2015	Huesca	3–2	Villarreal	Huesca
21:00 CET (UTC+01:00)	Luis Fernández 3'; Mérida 53' (pen.); Machís 75'	Report	Nahuel 51'; Bakambu 58'	Stadium: El Alcoraz; Attendance: 2,392; Referee: Del Cerro Grande

3 December 2015	Mirandés	2–1	Málaga	Miranda de Ebro
21:00 CET (UTC+01:00)	Álex García 34'; Lago Junior 69'	Report	Santa Cruz 52'	Stadium: Anduva; Attendance: 2,639; Referee: José María Sánchez Martínez

3 December 2015	Levante	1–1	Espanyol	Valencia
21:00 CET (UTC+01:00)	Roger 83'	Report	Sylla 68'	Stadium: Ciutat de València; Attendance: 6,857; Referee: Iglesias Villanueva

3 December 2015	Ponferradina	3–0	Eibar	Ponferrada
21:00 CET (UTC+01:00)	Đorđević 11'; Jebor 26'; Khomchenovskyi 53'	Report		Stadium: El Toralín; Attendance: 3,889; Referee: Jaime Latre

3 December 2015	Las Palmas	2–1	Real Sociedad	Las Palmas
21:00 CET (UTC+01:00)	Asdrúbal 30'; Hernán 50'	Report	Bruma 11'	Stadium: Estadio Gran Canaria; Attendance: 9,963; Referee: Álvarez Izquierdo

=== Second leg ===
2 December 2015	Barcelona	6–1 (6–1 agg.)	Villanovense	Barcelona
20:00 CET (UTC+01:00)	Dani Alves 4'; Sandro 21', 31', 69'; Munir 51', 76'	Report	Juanfran 29'	Stadium: Camp Nou; Attendance: 67,703; Referee: Pérez Montero

15 December 2015	Deportivo La Coruña	1–1 (3–2 agg.)	Llagostera	A Coruña
20:00 CET (UTC+01:00)	Domínguez 69'	Report	López 79' (pen.)	Stadium: Riazor; Attendance: 11,408; Referee: Bikandi Garrido

15 December 2015	Sporting Gijón	3–3 (3–5 agg.)	Real Betis	Gijón
20:00 CET (UTC+01:00)	Bernardo 14'; Halilović 47', 72' (pen.)	Report	Van Wolfswinkel 18', 83'; Cejudo 88'	Stadium: El Molinón; Attendance: 12,642; Referee: González González

15 December 2015	Espanyol	2–1 (3–2 agg.)	Levante	Barcelona
21:00 CET (UTC+01:00)	Burgui 15'; Caicedo 52'	Report	Verza 8'	Stadium: Power8 Stadium; Attendance: 8,642; Referee: Del Cerro Grande

15 December 2015	Sevilla	2–0 (5–0 agg.)	UD Logroñés	Sevilla
21:00 CET (UTC+01:00)	Immobile 15'; Reyes 40'	Report		Stadium: Ramón Sánchez Pizjuán; Attendance: 14,666; Referee: Gil Manzano

16 December 2015	Eibar	4–0 (4–3 agg.)	Ponferradina	Eibar
20:00 CET (UTC+01:00)	Borja 45'; Enrich 62'; Verdi 73'; Arruabarrena 85' (pen.)	Report		Stadium: Ipurua; Attendance: 3,079; Referee: Clos Gómez

16 December 2015	Getafe	3–1 (3–3 agg.)	Rayo Vallecano	Getafe
20:00 CET (UTC+01:00)	Pedro León 8'; Vergini 23'; Vázquez 31'	Report	Bangoura 52'	Stadium: Coliseum Alfonso Pérez; Attendance: 4,161; Referee: Juan Martínez Munuera

16 December 2015	Athletic Bilbao	6–0 (8–0 agg.)	Linense	Bilbao
20:00 CET (UTC+01:00)	De Marcos 9'; Eraso 49'; Etxeita 56'; Sola 62'; García 67'; Rico 89'	Report		Stadium: San Mamés; Attendance: 19,871; Referee: Estrada Fernández

16 December 2015	Málaga	0–1 (1–3 agg.)	Mirandés	Málaga
21:00 CET (UTC+01:00)		Report	Lago Junior 73'	Stadium: La Rosaleda Stadium; Attendance: 13,574; Referee: Iglesias Villanueva

16 December 2015	Real Sociedad	1–1 (2–3 agg.)	Las Palmas	San Sebastián
21:00 CET (UTC+01:00)	Canales 46'	Report	Willian José 37'	Stadium: Anoeta; Attendance: 14,478; Referee: Fernández Borbalán

16 December 2015	Valencia	2–0 (5–1 agg.)	Barakaldo	Valencia
21:00 CET (UTC+01:00)	Mina 8'; Negredo 31'	Report		Stadium: Mestalla Stadium; Attendance: 14,137; Referee: Melero López

17 December 2015	Celta Vigo	1–0 (4–1 agg.)	Almería	Vigo
20:00 CET (UTC+01:00)	Wass 41'	Report		Stadium: Balaídos; Attendance: 8,447; Referee: Jaime Latre

17 December 2015	Atlético Madrid	1–0 (3–1 agg.)	Reus	Madrid
20:00 CET (UTC+01:00)	Thomas 53'	Report		Stadium: Vicente Calderón Stadium; Attendance: 23,114; Referee: Undiano Mallenco

17 December 2015	Granada	1–0 (2–2 agg.)	Leganés	Granada
21:00 CET (UTC+01:00)	El-Arabi 68'	Report		Stadium: Estadio Nuevo Los Cármenes; Attendance: 13,854; Referee: Mateu Lahoz

17 December 2015	Villarreal	2–0 (4–3 agg.)	Huesca	Villarreal
21:00 CET (UTC+01:00)	Trigueros 28'; Soldado 78'	Report		Stadium: Estadio El Madrigal; Attendance: 11,347; Referee: Ricardo de Burgos Bengoetxea

Not Played	Real Madrid	w/o	Cádiz	Madrid
Note: Real Madrid were disqualified from the tournament for fielding an ineligible player in the first leg.

== Round of 16 ==
Team 1	Agg.	Team 2	1st leg	2nd leg
Athletic Bilbao	4–2	Villarreal	3–2	1–0
Mirandés	4–1	Deportivo La Coruña	1–1	3–0
Valencia	7–0	Granada	4–0	3–0
Real Betis	0–6	Sevilla	0–2	0–4
Barcelona	6–1	Espanyol	4–1	2–0
Rayo Vallecano	1–4	Atlético Madrid	1–1	0–3
Eibar	4–6	Las Palmas	2–3	2–3
Cádiz	0–5	Celta Vigo	0–3	0–2

=== First leg ===
6 January 2016	Athletic Bilbao	3–2	Villarreal	Bilbao
12:00 CET (UTC+01:00)	Williams 54'; Aduriz 68'; Laporte 81'	Report	Baptistão 16'; Samu 38'	Stadium: San Mamés; Attendance: 36,599; Referee: Clos Gómez

6 January 2016	Mirandés	1–1	Deportivo La Coruña	Miranda de Ebro
16:00 CET (UTC+01:00)	Ortiz 25'	Report	Lopo 75'	Stadium: Anduva; Attendance: 1,963; Referee: Prieto Iglesias

6 January 2016	Valencia	4–0	Granada	Valencia
16:00 CET (UTC+01:00)	Negredo 8', 63' (pen.), 83' (pen.); Rodrigo 35'	Report		Stadium: Mestalla Stadium; Attendance: 19,527; Referee: Gil Manzano

6 January 2016	Real Betis	0–2	Sevilla	Sevilla
18:15 CET (UTC+01:00)		Report	Krohn-Dehli 13'; Krychowiak 49'	Stadium: Benito Villamarín; Attendance: 36,832; Referee: Del Cerro Grande

6 January 2016	Barcelona	4–1	Espanyol	Barcelona
20:30 CET (UTC+01:00)	Messi 13', 44'; Piqué 49'; Neymar 88'	Report	Caicedo 9'	Stadium: Camp Nou; Attendance: 76,667; Referee: Juan Martínez Munuera

6 January 2016	Rayo Vallecano	1–1	Atlético Madrid	Madrid
22:05 CET (UTC+01:00)	Nacho 35'	Report	Saúl 67'	Stadium: Vallecas; Attendance: 5,223; Referee: Jaime Latre

7 January 2016	Eibar	2–3	Las Palmas	Eibar
20:30 CET (UTC+01:00)	Hajrović 10'; Berjón 20'	Report	Aythami 16'; Mubarak 60'; Momo 90'	Stadium: Ipurua; Attendance: 4,536; Referee: Álvarez Izquierdo

7 January 2016	Cádiz	0–3	Celta Vigo	Cádiz
20:30 CET (UTC+01:00)		Report	Guidetti 25', 79'; Jonny 58'	Stadium: Ramón de Carranza; Attendance: 9,204; Referee: Undiano Mallenco

=== Second leg ===
12 January 2016	Sevilla	4–0 (6–0 agg.)	Real Betis	Sevilla
20:30 CET (UTC+01:00)	Reyes 4'; Rami 35'; Gameiro 73'; Kakuta 89'	Report		Stadium: Ramón Sánchez Pizjuán; Attendance: 36,812; Referee: Mateu Lahoz

12 January 2016	Deportivo La Coruña	0–3 (1–4 agg.)	Mirandés	A Coruña
20:30 CET (UTC+01:00)		Report	Provencio 41', 71'; Prats 55'	Stadium: Riazor; Attendance: 11,387; Referee: Hernández Hernández

13 January 2016	Celta Vigo	2–0 (5–0 agg.)	Cádiz	Vigo
20:30 CET (UTC+01:00)	Guidetti 35' (pen.); Dražić 78'	Report		Stadium: Balaídos; Attendance: 5,695; Referee: José María Sánchez Martínez

13 January 2016	Villarreal	0–1 (2–4 agg.)	Athletic Bilbao	Villarreal
20:30 CET (UTC+01:00)		Report	Williams 21'	Stadium: El Madrigal; Attendance: 14,540; Referee: Velasco Carballo

13 January 2016	Espanyol	0–2 (1–6 agg.)	Barcelona	Barcelona
21:00 CET (UTC+01:00)		Report	Munir 32', 88'	Stadium: RCDE Stadium; Attendance: 20,843; Referee: Fernández Borbalán

13 January 2016	Las Palmas	3–2 (6–4 agg.)	Eibar	Las Palmas
21:00 CET (UTC+01:00)	Juncà 43' (o.g.); Momo 59'; García 83'	Report	Ekiza 52'; Enrich 53'	Stadium: Gran Canaria; Attendance: 13,588; Referee: Pérez Montero

14 January 2016	Granada	0–3 (0–7 agg.)	Valencia	Granada
20:00 CET (UTC+01:00)		Report	Zahibo 42'; Alcácer 63'; Piatti 84' (pen.)	Stadium: Los Cármenes; Attendance: 9,416; Referee: Estrada Fernández

14 January 2016	Atlético Madrid	3–0 (4–1 agg.)	Rayo Vallecano	Madrid
20:30 CET (UTC+01:00)	Correa 40'; Griezmann 80', 90'	Report		Stadium: Vicente Calderón; Attendance: 23,522; Referee: González González

== Quarter-finals ==
Team 1	Agg.	Team 2	1st leg	2nd leg
Celta Vigo	3–2	Atlético Madrid	0–0	3–2
Athletic Bilbao	2–5	Barcelona	1–2	1–3
Valencia	2–1	Las Palmas	1–1	1–0
Sevilla	5–0	Mirandés	2–0	3–0

=== First leg ===
20 January 2016	Celta Vigo	0–0	Atlético Madrid	Vigo
20:30 CET (UTC+01:00)		Report		Stadium: Balaídos; Attendance: 17,428; Referee: Estrada Fernández

20 January 2016	Athletic Bilbao	1–2	Barcelona	Bilbao
21:00 CET (UTC+01:00)	Aduriz 89'	Report	Munir 18'; Neymar 24'	Stadium: San Mamés; Attendance: 46,224; Referee: González González

21 January 2016	Valencia	1–1	Las Palmas	Valencia
20:00 CET (UTC+01:00)	Alcácer 61'	Report	Zahibo 38' (o.g.)	Stadium: Mestalla; Attendance: 15,400; Referee: Del Cerro Grande

21 January 2016	Sevilla	2–0	Mirandés	Seville
21:00 CET (UTC+01:00)	Nzonzi 20'; Vitolo 90+4'	Report		Stadium: Ramón Sánchez Pizjuán; Attendance: 25,341; Referee: Ricardo de Burgos Bengoetxea

=== Second leg ===
27 January 2016	Atlético Madrid	2–3 (2–3 agg.)	Celta Vigo	Madrid
20:30 CET (UTC+01:00)	Griezmann 29'; Correa 81'	Report	Hernández 22', 64'; Guidetti 56'	Stadium: Vicente Calderón; Attendance: 36,852; Referee: Mateu Lahoz

27 January 2016	Barcelona	3–1 (5–2 agg.)	Athletic Bilbao	Barcelona
21:30 CET (UTC+01:00)	Suárez 53'; Piqué 81'; Neymar 90+1'	Report	Williams 12'	Stadium: Camp Nou; Attendance: 63,405; Referee: Hernández Hernández

28 January 2016	Mirandés	0–3 (0–5 agg.)	Sevilla	Miranda de Ebro
20:00 CET (UTC+01:00)		Report	Iborra 9' (pen.); Muñoz 70'; Coke 90+2'	Stadium: Anduva; Attendance: 4,426; Referee: Vicandi Garrido

28 January 2016	Las Palmas	0–1 (1–2 agg.)	Valencia	Las Palmas
21:00 CET (UTC+01:00)		Report	Rodrigo 20'	Stadium: Gran Canaria; Attendance: 18,206; Referee: Fernández Borbalán

== Semi-finals ==
Team 1	Agg.	Team 2	1st leg	2nd leg
Barcelona	8–1	Valencia	7–0	1–1
Sevilla	6–2	Celta Vigo	4–0	2–2

=== First leg ===
3 February 2016	Barcelona	7–0	Valencia	Barcelona
21:00 CET (UTC+01:00)	Suárez 7', 12', 83', 88'; Messi 29', 59', 74'	Report		Stadium: Camp Nou; Attendance: 60,635; Referee: Iglesias Villanueva

4 February 2016	Sevilla	4–0	Celta Vigo	Seville
20:30 CET (UTC+01:00)	Rami 45'; Gameiro 60', 62'; Krohn-Dehli 87'	Report		Stadium: Ramón Sánchez Pizjuán; Attendance: 36,659; Referee: Clos Gómez

=== Second leg ===
10 February 2016	Valencia	1–1 (1–8 agg.)	Barcelona	Valencia
20:00 CET (UTC+01:00)	Negredo 39'	Report	Kaptoum 84'	Stadium: Mestalla; Attendance: 16,296; Referee: Velasco Carballo

11 February 2016	Celta Vigo	2–2 (2–6 agg.)	Sevilla	Vigo
21:00 CET (UTC+01:00)	Aspas 36', 55'	Report	Banega 57'; Konoplyanka 87'	Stadium: Balaídos; Attendance: 15,201; Referee: Juan Martínez Munuera

== Final ==
22 May 2016
21:30 CEST

Barcelona	2–0 (a.e.t.)	Sevilla
Alba 97'; Neymar 120+2'	Report

Vicente Calderón, Madrid
Attendance: 54,907
Referee: Carlos del Cerro Grande

== Top goalscorers ==
Rank	Player	Club	Goals
1	(Spain) Álvaro Negredo	Valencia	5
1	(Sweden) John Guidetti	Celta Vigo	5
1	(Argentina) Lionel Messi	Barcelona	5
1	(Spain) Munir	Barcelona	5
1	(Uruguay) Luis Suárez	Barcelona	5
6	(Spain) Abdón Prats	Mirandés	4
6	(Spain) Alain Arroyo	Barakaldo	4
6	(Spain) Iago Aspas	Celta Vigo	4
6	(Brazil) Neymar	Barcelona	4
9	(Spain) José Cutillas	Villanovense	3
9	(France) Kevin Gameiro	Sevilla	3
9	(France) Antoine Griezmann	Atlético Madrid	3
9	(Denmark) Michael Krohn-Dehli	Sevilla	3
9	(Spain) Sandro Ramírez	Barcelona	3
9	(Spain) Iñaki Williams	Athletic Bilbao	3
