= 1951–52 Segunda División =

21st season of the second-tier football league in Spain

Segunda División
- Season: 1951–52
- Champions: Oviedo; Málaga
- Promoted: Oviedo; Málaga
- Relegated: Levante; Badalona; Alicante; Lucense; Cartagena
- Matches: 480
- Goals: 1,584 (3.3 per match)
- Top goalscorer: Pedro Bazán (25 goals)
- Best goalkeeper: José María Martí (0.96 goals/match)
- Biggest home win: Ferrol 8–0 San Andrés (30 September 1951); Oviedo 8–0 Lucense (6 January 1952); Linense 8–0 Real Córdoba (13 April 1952)
- Biggest away win: Linense 0–6 Mestalla (9 March 1952)
- Highest scoring: Málaga 8–2 Cartagena (11 November 1951); Oviedo 7–3 Gimnástica Torrelavega (9 March 1952)

The 1951–52 Segunda División season was the 21st since its establishment and was played between 8 September 1951 and 13 April 1952.

== Overview before the season ==
32 teams joined the league, including 4 relegated from the 1950–51 La Liga and 4 promoted from the 1950–51 Tercera División.

Relegated from La Liga

- Málaga
- Murcia
- Alcoyano
- Lérida

Promoted from Tercera División

- Atlético Baleares
- Caudal
- Alavés
- Alicante

== Group North ==
=== Teams ===
Location of teams in Segunda División 1951-52 Group North

Club	City	Stadium
Deportivo Alavés	Vitoria	Mendizorroza
CF Badalona	Badalona	Avenida de Navarra
Club Baracaldo	Baracaldo	Lasesarre
Caudal Deportivo	Mieres	El Batán
Club Ferrol	Ferrol	Inferniño
RS Gimnástica de Torrelavega	Torrelavega	El Malecón
Gimnástico de Tarragona	Tarragona	Avenida de Cataluña
UD Huesca	Huesca	San Jorge
UD Lérida	Lérida	Campo de Deportes
CD Logroñés	Logroño	Las Gaunas
SG Lucense	Lugo	Los Miñones
UD Orensana	Orense	O Couto
CA Osasuna	Pamplona	San Juan
Real Oviedo CF	Oviedo	Buenavista
CD Sabadell FC	Sabadell	Cruz Alta
CD San Andrés	Barcelona	Santa Coloma

=== League table ===
Pos	Team	Pld	W	D	L	GF	GA	GD	Pts	Qualification or relegation
1	Oviedo (P)	30	16	7	7	66	29	+37	39	Promotion to La Liga
2	Logroñés	30	15	6	9	48	40	+8	36	Qualification for the promotion playoffs
3	Ferrol	30	11	11	8	55	44	+11	33 (Note: Ferrol finished ahead of Sabadell, Baracaldo and Osasuna on head-to-head points: Ferrol 8 pts, Sabadell 7 pts, Baracaldo 5 pts, Osasuna 4 pts)	Qualification for the promotion playoffs
4	Sabadell	30	13	7	10	58	44	+14	33	
5	Baracaldo	30	13	7	10	61	32	+29	33	
6	Osasuna	30	12	9	9	49	41	+8	33	
7	Lérida	30	14	4	12	41	52	−11	32 (Note: Lérida finished ahead of Caudal on head-to-head goal difference: Caudal–Lérida 4–2, Lérida–Caudal 3–0)	
8	Caudal (O)	30	13	6	11	55	45	+10	32	Qualification for the relegation playoffs
9	Alavés	30	10	10	10	51	50	+1	30	Qualification for the relegation playoffs
10	Gimnástica Torrelavega	30	12	5	13	49	60	−11	29 (Note: Gimnástica Torrelavega finished ahead of Huesca on head-to-head goal difference: Huesca–Gimnástica Torrelavega 1–0, Gimnástica Torrelavega–Huesca 4–2)	Qualification for the relegation playoffs
11	Huesca (Note: Remained after Segunda División restructuring)	30	13	3	14	56	64	−8	29	Relegation to Tercera División
12	San Andrés (Note: Remained after Segunda División restructuring)	30	12	4	14	51	57	−6	28 (Note: San Andrés finished ahead of Gimnástico on head-to-head goal difference: San Andrés–Gimnástico 7–2, Gimnástico–San Andrés 2–1)	Relegation to Tercera División
13	Gimnástico (Note: Remained after Segunda División restructuring)	30	9	10	11	51	71	−20	28	Relegation to Tercera División
14	Orensana (Note: Orensana was dissolved at the end of the season)	30	9	6	15	40	56	−16	24	Dissolved
15	Badalona (R)	30	7	7	16	49	64	−15	21	Relegation to Tercera División
16	Lucense (R)	30	5	10	15	32	63	−31	20	Relegation to Tercera División

Source: BDFútbol
Rules for classification: 1) points; 2) head-to-head points; 3) head-to-head goal difference; 4) goal difference; 5) number of goals scored
(O) Play-off winners; (P) Promoted; (R) Relegated

=== Results ===
Home \ Away	ALA	BAD	BAR	CAU	NAS	GIM	HUE	LLE	LOG	LUC	ORE	OSA	OVI	RFE	SAB	STA
Alavés	—	3–0	2–2	6–1	3–0	1–1	4–0	3–0	1–0	1–1	1–1	1–1	0–2	3–2	2–1	1–0
Badalona	2–2	—	0–1	2–5	3–3	4–2	6–0	2–0	2–2	3–0	4–1	1–2	0–0	6–1	1–3	3–2
Baracaldo	5–1	2–0	—	2–0	5–0	5–0	5–2	3–0	3–1	2–2	3–0	6–1	2–4	0–0	1–1	4–1
Caudal	4–1	3–0	1–1	—	1–1	2–0	4–0	4–2	0–1	4–0	1–0	5–1	2–1	2–2	2–0	1–1
Gimnástico	2–1	4–1	2–1	3–2	—	3–1	3–3	3–2	1–1	5–0	5–2	0–0	1–1	0–0	1–4	2–1
Gimnástica Torrelavega	4–3	4–0	0–3	1–0	3–0	—	4–2	2–1	2–2	4–1	2–1	1–0	2–0	1–1	3–1	2–1
Huesca	1–3	3–0	2–1	0–3	7–1	1–0	—	1–1	4–1	2–1	2–0	2–1	2–1	5–1	1–0	7–2
Lérida	1–0	2–2	1–0	3–0	3–0	1–0	3–2	—	2–1	2–0	3–1	2–1	1–0	2–2	2–1	2–0
Logroñés	2–1	2–1	2–0	2–1	4–0	3–2	4–1	2–1	—	2–1	5–1	0–1	1–0	1–0	1–1	1–0
Lucense	0–0	2–1	0–0	2–3	2–2	1–1	3–0	1–2	0–0	—	2–0	1–1	2–1	0–0	3–0	2–3
Orensana	1–1	1–1	1–0	1–0	2–0	1–1	1–2	3–1	5–1	5–1	—	1–1	1–1	1–0	4–2	1–0
Osasuna	3–1	6–0	2–2	1–1	3–2	2–0	1–0	5–0	2–1	4–1	2–1	—	1–2	2–2	2–1	1–1
Oviedo	1–1	2–2	1–0	5–1	3–0	7–3	4–0	2–0	2–0	8–0	6–0	2–0	—	2–0	1–1	3–1
Ferrol	2–2	2–0	2–1	2–1	3–3	2–0	2–1	6–1	3–3	1–1	3–0	1–0	3–0	—	2–1	8–0
Sabadell	6–1	2–1	2–1	3–0	2–2	7–2	2–2	0–0	1–0	4–1	2–1	2–1	2–2	3–1	—	1–0
San Andrés	4–1	2–1	1–0	1–1	7–2	4–1	2–1	5–0	1–2	2–1	3–2	1–1	0–2	2–1	3–2	—

Source: BDFútbol
Legend: Blue = home team win; Yellow = draw; Red = away team win.

=== Top goalscorers ===
Goalscorers	Goals	Team
(Spain) Esteban Echevarría	17	Gimnástica Torrelavega
(Spain) Alvarito	15	Ferrol
(Spain) Julio Remacha	15	Alavés
(Spain) Félix Marcaida	14	Baracaldo
(Spain) Ángel Calvo	13	Baracaldo

=== Top goalkeepers ===
Goalkeeper	Goals	Matches	Average	Team
(Spain) Joaquín Gascón	26	21	1.24	Sabadell
(Spain) Goyo	38	26	1.46	Osasuna
(Spain) Amaro Méndez	40	27	1.48	Caudal
(Spain) Luis Pujolrás	42	26	1.62	San Andrés
(Spain) Enrique Garatea	44	24	1.83	Huesca

== Group South ==
=== Teams ===
Location of teams in Segunda División 1951-52 Group South

Club	City	Stadium
CD Alcoyano	Alcoy	Estadio El Collao
Alicante CF	Alicante	Bardín
CD Atlético Baleares	Palma de Mallorca	Son Canals
Cartagena CF	Cartagena	El Armajarl
RCD Córdoba	Córdoba	El Árcangel
Granada CF	Granada	Los Cármenes
Hércules CF	Alicante	La Viña
Levante UD	Valencia	Vallejo
RB Linense	La Línea de la Concepción	La Balompédica
CD Málaga	Málaga	La Rosaleda
RCD Mallorca	Palma de Mallorca	Es Fortí
UD Melilla	Melilla	Álvarez Claro
CD Mestalla	Valencia	Mestalla
Real Murcia	Murcia	La Condomina
AD Plus Ultra	Madrid	Campo de Ciudad Lineal
UD Salamanca	Salamanca	El Calvario

=== League table ===
Pos	Team	Pld	W	D	L	GF	GA	GD	Pts	Qualification or relegation
1	Málaga (P)	30	18	6	6	83	37	+46	42	Promotion to La Liga
2	Mestalla (O)	30	18	4	8	63	32	+31	40	Qualification for the promotion playoffs
3	Alcoyano	30	16	4	10	55	39	+16	36 (Note: Alcoyano finished ahead of Hércules on head-to-head goal difference: Alcoyano–Hércules 5–2, Hércules–Alcoyano 1–0)	Qualification for the promotion playoffs
4	Hércules	30	15	6	9	41	37	+4	36	
5	Murcia	30	13	7	10	44	39	+5	33	
6	Mallorca	30	15	2	13	60	39	+21	32 (Note: Mallorca finished ahead of Salamanca on head-to-head goal difference: Mallorca–Salamanca 5–0, Salamanca–Mallorca 3–2)	
7	Salamanca	30	14	4	12	45	44	+1	32	
8	Melilla (O)	30	13	4	13	59	51	+8	30	Qualification for the relegation playoffs
9	Real Córdoba	30	13	3	14	52	64	−12	29	Qualification for the relegation playoffs
10	Atlético Baleares	30	13	2	15	52	56	−4	28	Qualification for the relegation playoffs
11	Linense (Note: Remained after Segunda División restructuring)	30	9	8	13	46	69	−23	26	Relegation to Tercera División
12	Plus Ultra (Note: Remained after Segunda División restructuring)	30	10	5	15	38	53	−15	25	Relegation to Tercera División
13	Granada (Note: Remained after Segunda División restructuring)	30	9	6	15	32	53	−21	24 (Note: Granada finished ahead of Levante and Alicante on head-to-head points: Granada 5 pts, Levante 4 pts, Alicante 3 pts)	Relegation to Tercera División
14	Levante (R)	30	10	4	16	33	50	−17	24	Relegation to Tercera División
15	Alicante (R)	30	10	4	16	35	49	−14	24	Relegation to Tercera División
16	Cartagena (R)	30	6	7	17	34	60	−26	19	Relegation to Tercera División

Source: BDFútbol
Rules for classification: 1) points; 2) head-to-head points; 3) head-to-head goal difference; 4) goal difference; 5) number of goals scored
(O) Play-off winners; (P) Promoted; (R) Relegated

=== Results ===
Home \ Away	ALC	ALI	BAL	CAR	GRA	HER	LEV	LNS	CDM	MAL	MEL	MES	MUR	RMC	COR	SAL
Alcoyano	—	0–0	4–0	4–1	1–0	5–2	1–0	2–0	2–2	2–0	6–2	0–0	1–0	4–0	4–0	3–2
Alicante	1–0	—	1–2	1–0	1–1	0–1	3–1	4–1	4–0	2–0	2–0	0–4	4–2	2–1	2–0	0–1
Atlético Baleares	2–2	3–1	—	4–1	4–0	3–1	2–1	5–0	2–3	0–2	3–1	3–1	1–1	3–2	4–0	3–0
Cartagena	0–2	5–2	0–2	—	1–3	1–0	0–0	5–0	1–1	0–1	1–1	0–0	1–4	2–3	1–0	3–0
Granada	0–1	2–1	2–1	2–2	—	0–0	3–1	1–1	1–3	3–1	0–2	2–0	0–1	2–0	1–3	1–0
Hércules	1–0	2–0	3–1	1–1	4–1	—	2–0	0–0	1–0	1–0	3–2	1–1	1–1	3–1	2–1	3–0
Levante	1–3	3–0	1–0	0–1	1–0	1–2	—	3–0	1–0	3–2	3–0	0–2	1–0	2–2	3–0	1–1
Linense	1–2	3–1	5–0	3–2	0–0	2–0	1–1	—	1–1	2–2	1–0	0–6	7–1	2–2	8–0	1–0
Málaga	4–0	3–0	5–1	8–2	5–1	3–1	7–0	6–1	—	4–0	1–1	2–0	3–0	2–1	6–2	2–0
Mallorca	3–1	2–0	2–0	2–0	5–0	3–0	1–2	5–0	2–2	—	3–1	4–1	1–2	3–0	6–1	5–0
Melilla	3–1	2–0	5–1	3–1	2–1	4–1	4–1	3–1	4–5	4–0	—	2–0	2–0	3–1	0–0	2–3
Mestalla	2–0	3–1	5–1	2–0	4–1	0–1	3–1	7–1	1–0	2–1	4–1	—	2–0	5–0	4–3	2–1
Murcia	4–3	3–0	2–0	2–1	2–0	1–2	5–1	0–2	0–0	2–1	0–0	0–0	—	2–0	4–2	4–1
Plus Ultra	1–0	0–0	2–0	5–1	0–3	1–0	3–0	0–0	2–3	0–1	4–3	1–2	0–0	—	4–3	4–1
Real Córdoba	5–0	3–1	2–1	4–0	5–0	0–0	1–0	4–1	2–1	1–0	3–2	3–0	0–0	2–0	—	2–3
Salamanca	5–0	1–1	1–0	0–0	1–1	4–2	1–0	6–1	3–1	3–2	1–0	2–0	2–1	0–1	6–0	—

Source: BDFútbol
Legend: Blue = home team win; Yellow = draw; Red = away team win.

=== Top goalscorers ===
Goalscorers	Goals	Team
(Spain) Pedro Bazán	25	Málaga
(Uruguay) Sergio Rodríguez	22	Málaga
(Spain) Juan Manuel Martínez	21	Melilla
(Spain) Sócrates Belenguer	18	Mestalla
(Spain) Antonio Morro	18	Mallorca

=== Top goalkeepers ===
Goalkeeper	Goals	Matches	Average	Team
(Spain) José María Martí	22	23	0.96	Murcia
(Spain) Cosme	25	21	1.19	Hércules
(Spain) Pedro Caldentey	36	29	1.24	Mallorca
(Spain) Eduardo Soro	30	24	1.25	Alcoyano
(Spain) Ricardo Zamora	33	22	1.5	Salamanca

== Promotion playoffs ==
=== League table ===
Pos	Team	Pld	W	D	L	GF	GA	GD	Pts	Qualification or relegation
1	Mestalla (Note: Not promoted after being Valencia reserve team) (O)	10	5	4	1	27	10	+17	14	
2	Real Gijón (O)	10	5	3	2	20	14	+6	13	Remained at La Liga
3	Real Santander	10	5	1	4	27	20	+7	11	Remained at La Liga
4	Alcoyano	10	4	1	5	23	21	+2	9	
5	Logroñés	10	3	2	5	11	21	−10	8	
6	Ferrol	10	2	1	7	13	35	−22	5	

Source: BDFútbol
Rules for classification: 1) points; 2) head-to-head points; 3) head-to-head goal difference; 4) goal difference; 5) number of goals scored
(O) Play-off winners

=== Results ===
Home \ Away	ALC	LOG	MES	RFE	RAC	SPO
Alcoyano	—	7–2	2–2	4–3	4–2	3–4
Logroñés	1–0	—	1–1	1–1	2–0	3–2
Mestalla	2–0	5–1	—	4–0	6–1	2–2
Ferrol	1–0	2–0	1–4	—	3–7	1–3
Real Santander	3–1	2–0	1–0	10–0	—	1–1
Real Gijón	1–2	1–0	1–1	2–1	3–0	—

Source: BDFútbol
Legend: Blue = home team win; Yellow = draw; Red = away team win.

== Relegation playoffs ==
=== League table ===
Pos	Team	Pld	W	D	L	GF	GA	GD	Pts	Qualification or relegation
1	Caudal (O)	10	6	2	2	24	20	+4	14	
2	Melilla (O)	10	5	2	3	21	13	+8	12	
3	Gimnástica Torrelavega (Note: Remained after Segunda División restructuring)	10	4	3	3	21	18	+3	11	Relegation to Tercera División
4	Atlético Baleares (Note: Remained after Segunda División restructuring)	10	3	2	5	18	27	−9	8 (Note: Atlético Baleares finished ahead of Alavés on head-to-head points: Alavés–Atlético Baleares 1–2, Atlético Baleares–Alavés 3–1)	Relegation to Tercera División
5	Alavés (Note: Remained after Segunda División restructuring)	10	3	2	5	19	16	+3	8	Relegation to Tercera División
6	Real Córdoba (Note: Remained after Segunda División restructuring)	10	2	3	5	19	28	−9	7	Relegation to Tercera División

Source: BDFútbol
Rules for classification: 1) points; 2) head-to-head points; 3) head-to-head goal difference; 4) goal difference; 5) number of goals scored
(O) Play-off winners

=== Results ===
Home \ Away	ALA	BAL	CAU	GIM	MEL	COR
Alavés	—	1–2	2–2	1–2	4–1	4–0
Atlético Baleares	3–1	—	3–3	1–1	0–4	4–1
Caudal	2–1	4–1	—	3–2	2–0	4–2
Gimnástica Torrelavega	1–1	6–2	0–2	—	2–1	3–0
Melilla	1–0	3–1	4–0	4–1	—	1–1
Real Córdoba	2–4	3–1	5–2	3–3	2–2	—

Source: BDFútbol
Legend: Blue = home team win; Yellow = draw; Red = away team win.
