= Olabarrieta =

Olabarrieta is a Basque surname. Notable people with the surname include:

- Aingeru Olabarrieta (born 2005), Spanish footballer
- Amaia Olabarrieta (born 1982), Spanish footballer
- Esteban Echevarría Olabarrieta (1923–1987), Spanish footballer
- Maite Aranburu Olabarrieta, Spanish Basque politician
- Maitane Olabarrieta, Spanish and American oceanographer
