= 1949–50 Segunda División =

19th season of the second-tier football league in Spain

Segunda División
- Season: 1949–50
- Champions: Alcoyano; Real Santander
- Promoted: Real Santander; Lérida; Murcia; Alcoyano
- Relegated: Erandio; Elche; Arosa; Castellón
- Matches: 480
- Goals: 1,980 (4.13 per match)
- Top goalscorer: Pío Alonso (31 goals)
- Best goalkeeper: Vicente Izquierdo (1 goal/match)
- Biggest home win: Sabadell 11–1 Erandio (4 September 1949); Albacete 10–0 Salamanca (20 November 1949)
- Biggest away win: Baracaldo 0–4 Real Gijón (11 September 1949); Osasuna 3–7 Real Gijón (6 November 1949); Castellón 1–5 Hércules (5 February 1950); Castellón 1–5 Mallorca (5 March 1950)
- Highest scoring: Sabadell 11–1 Erandio (4 September 1949)

The 1949–50 Segunda División season was the 19th since its establishment and was played between 3 September 1949 and 30 April 1950.

== Overview before the season ==
32 teams joined the league, including two relegated from the 1948–49 La Liga and 18 promoted from the 1948–49 Tercera División.

Relegated from La Liga

- Alcoyano
- Sabadell

Promoted from Tercera División

- Orensana
- Osasuna
- Lérida
- Plus Ultra
- Albacete
- Atlético Tetuán
- Arosa
- Gimnástica Torrelavega
- Zaragoza
- Salamanca
- Elche
- Real Córdoba
- Numancia
- Linense
- Mallorca
- Lucense
- Cartagena
- Erandio

== Group North ==
=== Teams ===
Location of teams in Segunda División 1949-50 Group North

| Club | City | Stadium |
|---|---|---|
| Arosa SC | Villagarcía de Arosa | La Lomba |
| CF Badalona | Badalona | Avenida de Navarra |
| Club Baracaldo | Baracaldo | Lasesarre |
| Club Erandio | Erandio | Ategorri |
| Club Ferrol | Ferrol | Inferniño |
| Gerona CF | Gerona | Vista Alegre |
| Real Gijón | Gijón | El Molinón |
| RS Gimnástica de Torrelavega | Torrelavega | El Malecón |
| UD Lérida | Lérida | Campo de Deportes |
| SG Lucense | Lugo | Los Miñones |
| CD Numancia | Soria | San Andrés |
| UD Orensana | Orense | O Couto |
| CA Osasuna | Pamplona | San Juan |
| CD Sabadell FC | Sabadell | Cruz Alta |
| Real Santander SD | Santander | El Sardinero |
| Zaragoza CF | Zaragoza | Torrero |

=== League table ===
| Pos | Team | Pld | W | D | L | GF | GA | GD | Pts | Qualification or relegation |
|---|---|---|---|---|---|---|---|---|---|---|
| 1 | Real Santander (O, P) | 30 | 24 | 0 | 6 | 99 | 47 | +52 | 48 | Qualification for the promotion playoffs |
| 2 | Lérida (O, P) | 30 | 20 | 1 | 9 | 76 | 46 | +30 | 41 | Qualification for the promotion playoffs |
| 3 | Real Gijón | 30 | 17 | 5 | 8 | 89 | 46 | +43 | 39 | |
| 4 | Zaragoza | 30 | 17 | 4 | 9 | 77 | 59 | +18 | 38 | |
| 5 | Gimnástica Torrelavega | 30 | 15 | 7 | 8 | 73 | 54 | +19 | 37 | |
| 6 | Sabadell | 30 | 13 | 4 | 13 | 84 | 63 | +21 | 30 | |
| 7 | Osasuna | 30 | 13 | 2 | 15 | 71 | 77 | −6 | 28 (Note: Osasuna finished ahead of Orensana on head-to-head goal difference: Orensana–Osasuna 1–0, Osasuna–Orensana 3–1) | |
| 8 | Orensana | 30 | 11 | 6 | 13 | 44 | 49 | −5 | 28 | |
| 9 | Gerona | 30 | 12 | 3 | 15 | 49 | 69 | −20 | 27 | |
| 10 | Baracaldo | 30 | 10 | 6 | 14 | 45 | 62 | −17 | 26 | |
| 11 | Lucense | 30 | 12 | 1 | 17 | 54 | 65 | −11 | 25 (Note: Lucense finished ahead of Ferrol on head-to-head goal difference: Ferrol–Lucense 3–2, Lucense–Ferrol 5–0) | |
| 12 | Ferrol | 30 | 11 | 3 | 16 | 63 | 81 | −18 | 25 | |
| 13 | Numancia | 30 | 11 | 2 | 17 | 51 | 71 | −20 | 24 (Note: Numancia finished ahead of Erandio on head-to-head goal difference: Erandio–Numancia 1–0, Numancia–Erandio 4–0) | |
| 14 | Erandio (R) | 30 | 11 | 2 | 17 | 54 | 86 | −32 | 24 | Qualification for the relegation playoffs |
| 15 | Badalona (O) | 30 | 11 | 1 | 18 | 66 | 80 | −14 | 23 | Qualification for the relegation playoffs |
| 16 | Arosa (R) | 30 | 7 | 3 | 20 | 44 | 84 | −40 | 17 | Relegation to Tercera División |

Source: BDFútbol
Rules for classification: 1) points; 2) head-to-head points; 3) head-to-head goal difference; 4) goal difference; 5) number of goals scored
(O) Play-off winners; (P) Promoted; (R) Relegated

=== Results ===
| Home \ Away | ARO | BAD | BAR | ERA | GIM | GIR | LLE | LUC | NUM | ORE | OSA | RFE | RAC | SPO | SAB | ZAR |
|---|---|---|---|---|---|---|---|---|---|---|---|---|---|---|---|---|
| Arosa | — | 3–0 | 1–1 | 3–1 | 2–1 | 2–1 | 2–3 | 1–3 | 2–1 | 0–2 | 2–2 | 3–0 | 1–4 | 2–0 | 0–3 | 0–2 |
| Badalona | 5–1 | — | 8–2 | 0–1 | 3–1 | 4–0 | 1–3 | 3–1 | 3–1 | 5–3 | 3–1 | 4–2 | 2–3 | 2–1 | 5–0 | 2–4 |
| Baracaldo | 3–3 | 2–2 | — | 4–1 | 2–1 | 2–0 | 0–0 | 2–1 | 3–1 | 1–1 | 2–1 | 3–2 | 1–2 | 0–4 | 1–1 | 1–0 |
| Erandio | 6–2 | 5–3 | 4–1 | — | 0–2 | 1–1 | 4–1 | 3–2 | 1–0 | 0–1 | 1–0 | 2–2 | 2–5 | 3–2 | 5–2 | 1–4 |
| Gimnástica Torrelavega | 4–1 | 4–1 | 2–1 | 3–2 | — | 4–1 | 2–1 | 4–1 | 4–1 | 0–0 | 5–1 | 3–1 | 0–1 | 2–2 | 1–1 | 6–2 |
| Gerona | 4–2 | 3–1 | 2–1 | 3–0 | 2–1 | — | 0–2 | 2–1 | 3–0 | 4–1 | 3–0 | 5–2 | 1–4 | 1–1 | 1–0 | 2–2 |
| Lérida | 3–0 | 6–4 | 1–0 | 3–1 | 3–1 | 4–0 | — | 9–2 | 6–2 | 4–1 | 5–4 | 6–1 | 1–2 | 1–2 | 3–2 | 1–2 |
| Lucense | 3–2 | 5–0 | 0–1 | 5–1 | 1–2 | 2–0 | 0–1 | — | 1–2 | 1–0 | 3–0 | 5–0 | 2–1 | 2–1 | 1–0 | 1–2 |
| Numancia | 4–1 | 2–0 | 2–3 | 4–0 | 1–1 | 6–0 | 0–1 | 1–3 | — | 3–0 | 3–2 | 5–0 | 2–1 | 2–0 | 1–1 | 2–1 |
| Orensana | 1–0 | 5–0 | 4–2 | 1–2 | 1–1 | 3–0 | 0–1 | 1–1 | 2–0 | — | 1–0 | 5–0 | 1–0 | 1–1 | 3–1 | 1–1 |
| Osasuna | 1–0 | 4–0 | 2–0 | 4–1 | 5–5 | 3–0 | 5–2 | 4–1 | 4–1 | 3–1 | — | 2–0 | 0–2 | 3–7 | 6–2 | 1–0 |
| Ferrol | 7–0 | 4–0 | 1–0 | 3–2 | 7–2 | 3–2 | 2–1 | 3–2 | 4–0 | 1–0 | 3–4 | — | 2–4 | 2–5 | 0–0 | 5–1 |
| Real Santander | 3–2 | 6–3 | 4–1 | 4–1 | 2–3 | 5–2 | 4–1 | 8–0 | 5–0 | 4–1 | 6–4 | 2–0 | — | 3–2 | 7–2 | 4–1 |
| Real Gijón | 6–1 | 3–1 | 2–1 | 3–0 | 3–2 | 5–2 | 0–1 | 3–1 | 9–0 | 5–2 | 6–1 | 2–2 | 4–0 | — | 1–3 | 3–1 |
| Sabadell | 5–1 | 2–1 | 3–2 | 11–1 | 3–4 | 3–4 | 0–1 | 4–2 | 6–2 | 5–1 | 8–1 | 5–1 | 4–1 | 2–4 | — | 5–1 |
| Zaragoza | 5–4 | 2–0 | 6–2 | 7–2 | 2–2 | 4–0 | 2–1 | 4–1 | 4–2 | 3–0 | 4–3 | 6–3 | 1–2 | 2–2 | 1–0 | — |

Source: BDFútbol
Legend: Blue = home team win; Yellow = draw; Red = away team win.

=== Top goalscorers ===
| Goalscorers | Goals | Team |
|---|---|---|
| (Spain) Pío Alonso | 31 | Real Gijón |
| (Spain) José Luis Duque | 28 | Gimnástica Torrelavega |
| (Spain) Joseíto | 25 | Real Santander |
| (Spain) Manuel Badenes | 21 | Zaragoza |
| (Spain) Sebastián Fustero | 18 | Lérida |

=== Top goalkeepers ===
| Goalkeeper | Goals | Matches | Average | Team |
|---|---|---|---|---|
| (Spain) José Rivero | 38 | 29 | 1.31 | Lérida |
| (Spain) Juan Delgado | 42 | 28 | 1.5 | Real Santander |
| (Spain) José María Munárriz | 25 | 16 | 1.56 | Real Gijón |
| (Spain) Manuel Lestón | 38 | 24 | 1.58 | Orensana |
| (Spain) Higinio Martí | 20 | 11 | 1.82 | Zaragoza |

== Group South ==
=== Teams ===
Location of teams in Segunda División 1949-50 Group South

| Club | City | Stadium |
|---|---|---|
| Albacete Balompié | Albacete | Parque de los Mártires |
| CD Alcoyano | Alcoy | El Collao |
| Atlético Tetuán | Tetouan | Varela |
| Cartagena CF | Cartagena | El Armarjal |
| CD Castellón | Castellón de la Plana | Castalia |
| RCD Córdoba | Córdoba | El Árcangel |
| Elche CF | Elche | Altabix |
| Granada CF | Granada | Los Cármenes |
| Hércules CF | Alicante | La Viña |
| Levante UD | Valencia | Vallejo |
| RB Linense | La Línea de la Concepción | La Balompédica |
| RCD Mallorca | Palma de Mallorca | Es Fortí |
| CD Mestalla | Valencia | Mestalla |
| Real Murcia | Murcia | La Condomina |
| AD Plus Ultra | Madrid | Campo de Ciudad Lineal |
| UD Salamanca | Salamanca | El Calvario |

=== League table ===
| Pos | Team | Pld | W | D | L | GF | GA | GD | Pts | Qualification or relegation |
|---|---|---|---|---|---|---|---|---|---|---|
| 1 | Alcoyano (P) | 30 | 19 | 3 | 8 | 69 | 41 | +28 | 41 | Qualification for the promotion playoffs |
| 2 | Murcia (P) | 30 | 18 | 2 | 10 | 80 | 49 | +31 | 38 (Note: Murcia finished ahead of Plus Ultra on head-to-head points: Plus Ultra–Murcia 3–3, Murcia–Plus Ultra 1–0) | Qualification for the promotion playoffs |
| 3 | Plus Ultra | 30 | 17 | 4 | 9 | 68 | 52 | +16 | 38 | |
| 4 | Salamanca | 30 | 16 | 2 | 12 | 55 | 68 | −13 | 34 | |
| 5 | Atlético Tetuán | 30 | 15 | 3 | 12 | 55 | 40 | +15 | 33 (Note: Atlético Tetuán finished ahead of Mestalla on head-to-head goal difference: Mestalla–Atlético Tetuán 3–2, Atlético Tetuán–Mestalla 3–0) | |
| 6 | Mestalla | 30 | 14 | 5 | 11 | 45 | 52 | −7 | 33 | |
| 7 | Albacete | 30 | 14 | 3 | 13 | 73 | 54 | +19 | 31 (Note: Albacete finished ahead of Real Córdoba on overall goal difference) | |
| 8 | Real Córdoba | 30 | 12 | 7 | 11 | 61 | 55 | +6 | 31 | |
| 9 | Granada | 30 | 14 | 2 | 14 | 71 | 53 | +18 | 30 | |
| 10 | Hércules | 30 | 12 | 5 | 13 | 58 | 50 | +8 | 29 (Note: Hércules finished ahead of Mallorca on head-to-head points: Mallorca–Hércules 0–1, Hércules–Mallorca 2–1) | |
| 11 | Mallorca | 30 | 13 | 3 | 14 | 62 | 61 | +1 | 29 | |
| 12 | Linense | 30 | 10 | 7 | 13 | 75 | 76 | −1 | 27 | |
| 13 | Levante | 30 | 8 | 9 | 13 | 46 | 77 | −31 | 25 | |
| 14 | Elche (Note: Two points deducted after not appear at his match resume against Murcia) (R) | 30 | 11 | 3 | 16 | 46 | 67 | −21 | 23 | Qualification for the relegation playoffs |
| 15 | Cartagena (O) | 30 | 10 | 1 | 19 | 54 | 69 | −15 | 21 | Qualification for the relegation playoffs |
| 16 | Castellón (R) | 30 | 6 | 3 | 21 | 23 | 77 | −54 | 15 | Relegation to Tercera División |

Source: BDFútbol
Rules for classification: 1) points; 2) head-to-head points; 3) head-to-head goal difference; 4) goal difference; 5) number of goals scored
(O) Play-off winners; (P) Promoted; (R) Relegated

=== Results ===
| Home \ Away | ALB | ALC | TET | CAR | CAS | ELC | GRA | HER | LEV | LNS | MAL | MES | MUR | RMC | COR | SAL |
|---|---|---|---|---|---|---|---|---|---|---|---|---|---|---|---|---|
| Albacete | — | 2–1 | 3–2 | 6–3 | 5–0 | 2–1 | 6–1 | 1–0 | 5–1 | 1–1 | 3–2 | 1–2 | 5–3 | 5–0 | 3–0 | 10–0 |
| Alcoyano | 2–1 | — | 4–1 | 4–1 | 2–0 | 4–1 | 2–1 | 3–1 | 3–0 | 3–0 | 3–1 | 2–2 | 5–2 | 2–0 | 3–1 | 5–1 |
| Atlético Tetuán | 3–0 | 0–0 | — | 2–0 | 4–0 | 4–0 | 0–2 | 5–1 | 6–0 | 2–0 | 2–0 | 3–0 | 1–0 | 2–0 | 4–0 | 2–1 |
| Cartagena | 0–3 | 4–1 | 0–1 | — | 1–2 | 2–0 | 3–0 | 4–1 | 2–0 | 6–2 | 4–2 | 2–1 | 1–5 | 1–1 | 4–1 | 6–0 |
| Castellón | 2–0 | 0–2 | 2–0 | 2–0 | — | 3–1 | 0–2 | 1–5 | 0–0 | 1–1 | 1–5 | 0–2 | 1–4 | 0–1 | 1–0 | 0–1 |
| Elche | 4–2 | 1–2 | 3–1 | 3–1 | 4–0 | — | 1–0 | 2–2 | 3–2 | 2–0 | 4–3 | 1–0 | 0–1 | 1–0 | 1–0 | 1–2 |
| Granada | 4–2 | 0–0 | 3–1 | 6–1 | 6–0 | 3–1 | — | 0–2 | 8–1 | 9–2 | 2–0 | 3–2 | 1–0 | 2–2 | 1–2 | 7–2 |
| Hércules | 2–0 | 1–2 | 0–2 | 4–1 | 3–0 | 3–0 | 1–3 | — | 3–2 | 5–1 | 2–1 | 1–2 | 3–0 | 1–2 | 2–2 | 6–0 |
| Levante | 2–2 | 0–1 | 1–1 | 1–0 | 4–1 | 4–3 | 3–2 | 1–1 | — | 2–0 | 2–2 | 1–1 | 1–1 | 3–2 | 2–2 | 4–2 |
| Linense | 1–1 | 1–2 | 5–1 | 8–2 | 7–3 | 8–2 | 2–1 | 2–2 | 4–0 | — | 4–0 | 4–1 | 4–2 | 3–1 | 1–1 | 1–1 |
| Mallorca | 3–1 | 2–1 | 4–2 | 1–0 | 2–1 | 2–2 | 3–1 | 0–1 | 6–1 | 6–4 | — | 1–1 | 3–2 | 6–1 | 3–2 | 1–0 |
| Mestalla | 1–0 | 3–2 | 3–2 | 2–0 | 3–0 | 1–1 | 3–1 | 1–1 | 1–3 | 2–1 | 1–0 | — | 1–0 | 0–1 | 3–1 | 3–0 |
| Murcia | 6–1 | 3–1 | 1–0 | 2–1 | 3–0 | 6–1 | 2–0 | 4–2 | 6–1 | 4–2 | 5–2 | 6–1 | — | 1–0 | 4–2 | 2–1 |
| Plus Ultra | 2–1 | 2–1 | 4–0 | 4–2 | 4–0 | 4–1 | 2–1 | 4–1 | 2–0 | 6–4 | 2–1 | 6–1 | 3–3 | — | 4–1 | 6–3 |
| Real Córdoba | 3–0 | 5–3 | 1–1 | 2–1 | 1–1 | 3–0 | 2–1 | 2–1 | 4–4 | 5–0 | 3–0 | 6–1 | 4–2 | 1–1 | — | 3–0 |
| Salamanca | 2–1 | 4–3 | 2–0 | 2–1 | 4–1 | 2–1 | 5–0 | 2–0 | 3–0 | 2–2 | 3–0 | 2–0 | 1–0 | 4–1 | 3–1 | — |

Source: BDFútbol
Legend: Blue = home team win; Yellow = draw; Red = away team win.

=== Top goalscorers ===
| Goalscorers | Goals | Team |
|---|---|---|
| (Spain) Manuel del Toro | 25 | Murcia |
| (Spain) Bozambo | 21 | Atlético Tetuán |
| (Spain) Juan Ayala | 21 | Linense |
| (Spain) Cabillo | 19 | Alcoyano |
| (Spain) Loren | 19 | Salamanca |

=== Top goalkeepers ===
| Goalkeeper | Goals | Matches | Average | Team |
|---|---|---|---|---|
| (Spain) Vicente Izquierdo | 15 | 15 | 1 | Mestalla |
| (Spain) Luis Martín | 39 | 30 | 1.3 | Alcoyano |
| (Spain) Manuel Pachón | 39 | 30 | 1.3 | Atlético Tetuán |
| (Spain) Juan Seva | 19 | 13 | 1.46 | Hércules |
| (Spain) Paquillo | 19 | 12 | 1.58 | Real Córdoba |

== Promotion playoffs ==
=== First round ===
==== League table ====
| Pos | Team | Pld | W | D | L | GF | GA | GD | Pts | Qualification or relegation |
|---|---|---|---|---|---|---|---|---|---|---|
| 1 | Real Santander | 6 | 4 | 1 | 1 | 20 | 8 | +12 | 9 | Promotion to La Liga |
| 2 | Lérida | 6 | 3 | 0 | 3 | 14 | 15 | −1 | 6 | Promotion to La Liga |
| 3 | Murcia | 6 | 2 | 1 | 3 | 13 | 15 | −2 | 5 | Qualification for the second round |
| 4 | Alcoyano | 6 | 2 | 0 | 4 | 10 | 19 | −9 | 4 | Qualification for the second round |

Source: BDFútbol
Rules for classification: 1) points; 2) head-to-head points; 3) head-to-head goal difference; 4) goal difference; 5) number of goals scored

==== Results ====
| Home \ Away | ALC | LLE | MUR | RAC |
|---|---|---|---|---|
| Alcoyano | — | 4–1 | 4–2 | 1–2 |
| Lérida | 4–1 | — | 4–1 | 3–2 |
| Murcia | 4–0 | 3–1 | — | 2–2 |
| Real Santander | 6–0 | 4–1 | 4–1 | — |

Source: BDFútbol
Legend: Blue = home team win; Yellow = draw; Red = away team win.

=== Second round ===
| 2 July 1950 | Alcoyano | 6–3 (a.e.t.) | Gimnástico | Barcelona |
| | Quisco 8', 78', 91', 95'; Pitarch 39' (pen.); Vinuesa 114' | Report | Bravo 34'; Alsúa 52' (pen.), 67' | Stadium: Sarrià; Referee: García Fernández |

| 2 July 1950 | Murcia | 2–0 | Oviedo | Madrid |
| | Del Toro 51'; Castillo 81' (o.g.) | Report | | Stadium: Metropolitano; Referee: Barderi Gibert |

== Relegation playoffs ==
| 9 July 1950 | Ceuta | 2–0 | Elche | Granada |
| | Urdiales 32'; Natalio 77' | Report | | Stadium: Los Cármenes; Referee: Pérez Rodríguez |

| 9 July 1950 | Badalona | 6–1 | Tortosa | Lleida |
| | Serratusell 25', 63', 82' (pen.); Enguix 55'; Vila 86'; Hill 90' | Report | Toha 23' | Stadium: Camp d'Esports; Referee: Giménez Molina |

| 9 July 1950 | San Andrés | 3–1 | Erandio | Zaragoza |
| | Vivet 28', 40', 48' | Report | Garín 45' | Stadium: Torrero; Referee: Arqué Martín |

| 9 July 1950 | Cartagena | 2–2 (a.e.t.) | Imperial Murcia | Alicante |
| | Guti 12'; Eduardo 71' | Report | Rodríguez 57' (pen.); Sornichero II 77' | Stadium: Bardín; Referee: Marrón Martín |

| 11 July 1950 | Cartagena | 3–0 | Imperial Murcia | Alicante |
| | Lucas 8'; Roca 28'; Jover 61' | Report | | Stadium: Bardín; Referee: De la Cruz Hernández |
