= SG Lucense =

Spanish association football club

Gimnástica Lucense
- Full name: Sociedad Gimnástica Lucense
- Founded: 1943
- Dissolved: 1952
- Ground: Os Miñóns, Lugo, Galicia, Spain
- Capacity: 5,500
Home colours

Sociedad Gimnástica Lucense was a Spanish football club based in Lugo, in the autonomous community of Galicia.

== History ==
Founded in 1943, the club immediately started to play in Tercera División, achieving promotion in 1949. After finishing 16th in the 1951–52 season, the club was dissolved. It happened on July 29, 1952, due to the unpaid debt.

One year later, Gimnástica merged with CD Polvorín and created CD Lugo.

== Season to season ==
| Season | Tier | Division | Place | Copa del Rey |
|---|---|---|---|---|
| 1943–44 | 3 | 3ª | 6th | Fourth round |
| 1944–45 | 3 | 3ª | 1st | |
| 1945–46 | 3 | 3ª | 5th | |
| 1946–47 | 3 | 3ª | 2nd | |
| 1947–48 | 3 | 3ª | 5th | Fifth round |
| 1948–49 | 3 | 3ª | 3rd | Fourth round |
| 1949–50 | 2 | 2ª | 11th | First round |
| 1950–51 | 2 | 2ª | 14th | |
| 1951–52 | 2 | 2ª | 16th | |

- 3 season in Segunda División
- 6 seasons in Tercera División
