= UD Orensana =

Spanish association football club

Orensana
- Full name: Unión Deportiva Orensana
- Founded: 1935
- Dissolved: 1952
- Ground: O Couto, Ourense, Galicia, Spain
- Capacity: 5,625
Home colours

Unión Deportiva Orensana was a Spanish football team based in Ourense, in the autonomous community of Galicia. Founded in 1935 after a merger between Galicia SC Orense and Burgas FC, it was dissolved in 1952 and CD Ourense was founded in its place.

== Season to season ==
Season	Tier	Division	Place	Copa del Rey
1942–43	3	Serie A	3rd	
1943–44	3	3ª	7th	Second round
1944–45	3	3ª	2nd	
1945–46	3	3ª	1st	
1946–47	3	3ª	5th	
1947–48	3	3ª	2nd	Second round
1948–49	3	3ª	1st	First round
1949–50	2	2ª	8th	Second round
1950–51	2	2ª	9th	
1951–52	2	2ª	14th	

- 3 seasons in Segunda División
- 6 seasons in Tercera División
