= Thomas S. Bianchi =

American oceanographer and biogeochemist

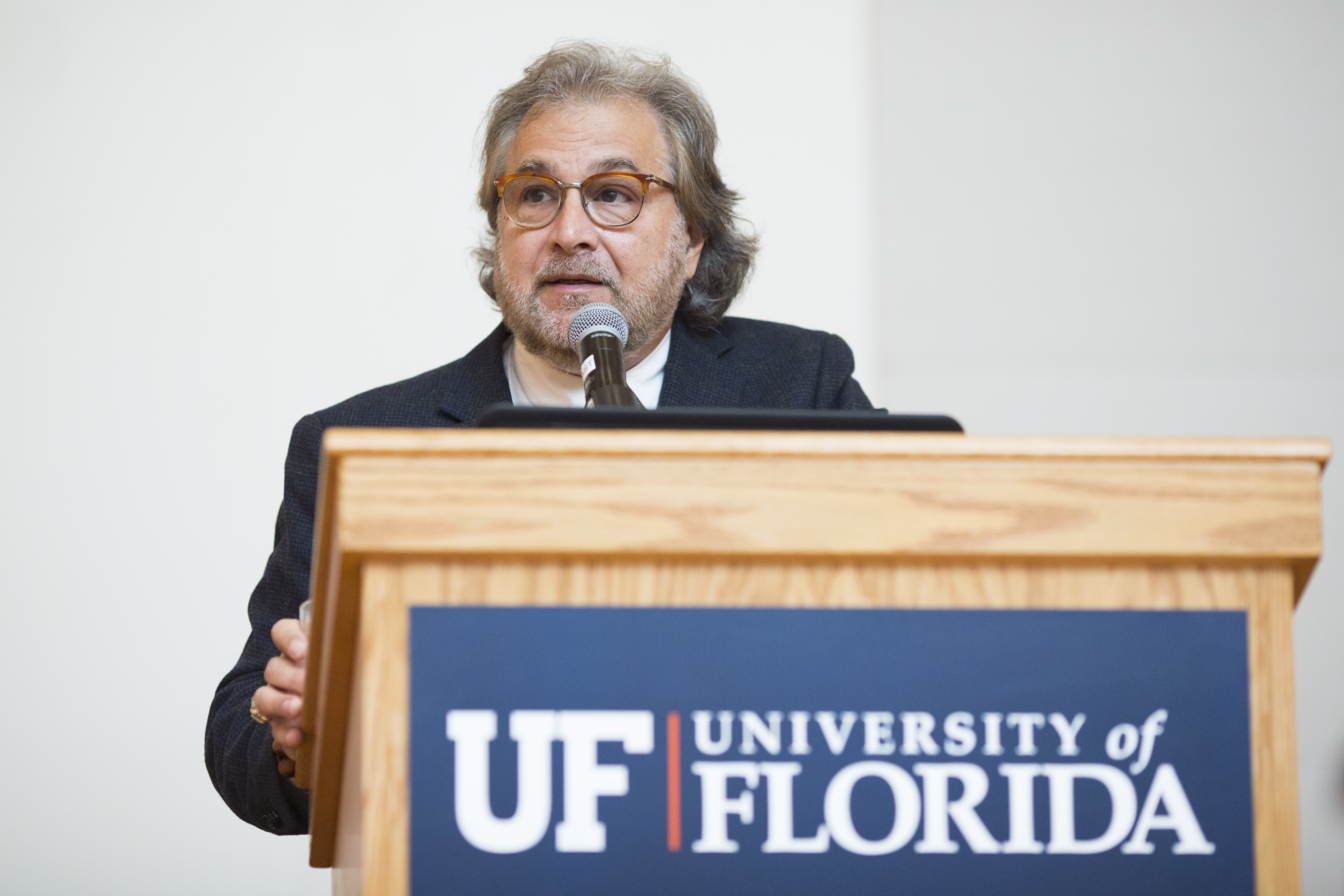
- Education: University of Maryland (Ph.D.); State University of New York at Stony Brook (M.A.); Dowling College (B.A.)
- Known for: Biogeochemistry, marine chemistry, organic geochemistry, chemical oceanography
- Awards: Fellow, Association for the Sciences of Limnology and Oceanography; Fellow, American Association for the Advancement of Science; Fellow, American Geophysical Union; Fellow, Geochemical Society and European Association of Geochemistry; Qilu Friendship Award; Vladimir Ivanovich Vernadsky Medal, European Geosciences Union
- Scientific career
- Workplaces: University of New Hampshire; University of Florida; Texas A&M University; Tulane University

Thomas S. Bianchi is an oceanographer and biogeochemist. He was most recently a Distinguished Professor, the Jon and Beverly Thompson Endowed Research Chair of Geological Sciences at the University of Florida, and is now a research professor at the Study of the Institute for the Study of Earth, Oceans, and Space at the University of New Hampshire University of New Hampshire. He is also editor-in-chief of the journal Marine Chemistry.

== Early life and education ==
Bianchi was born in 1956 in Richmond Hill, New York, and moved to Holbrook in eastern Long Island, where he stayed through his early college years. As a child, he was interested in basketball, largely influenced by his uncle, Al Bianchi, who was a professional basketball player. Bianchi has played drums through much of his life, and became interested in oceanography very early on.

He earned his Ph.D. from University of Maryland in 1987.

== Research and career ==
Bianchi has been a professor at the University of Florida since 2013. Before joining UF, he held full professor positions at Tulane University and Texas A&M University.

The main focus of his work has been the movement of organic matter, particularly as it interacts with changes in rivers, estuaries, and the ocean. His research team uses chemical biomarkers and other molecular tools from microbial ecology, organic geochemistry, and isotope geochemistry to explore carbon cycling in aquatic environments.

== Awards and recognition ==
- Vladimir Ivanovich Vernadsky Medal of the European Geosciences Union, 2026
- Edward P. Bass Distinguished Visiting Environmental Scholar, Yale Institute of Biospheric Studies, Yale University, 2023
- Fellow of the American Geophysical Union for his exceptional contributions in his respective field of Earth and space sciences, 2019
- Qilu Friendship Award, People's Government of Shandong Province, China, 2018
- Fellow of the Geochemical Society and the European Association of Geochemistry, 2017
- Fellow of the Association for the Sciences of Limnology and Oceanography, 2017
- Fellow of the American Association for the Advancement of Science, 2013

== Personal life ==
Bianchi is the son of Rita and Tom Bianchi, and is married to Jo Ann Bianchi (artist). They have a son, Christopher T. Bianchi (video artist).

== Books ==
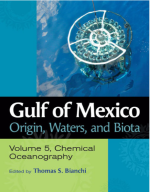
Cover of Gulf of Mexico: Origin, Waters, and Biota

- Gulf of Mexico: Origin, Waters, and Biota (Vol. 5, Chemical Oceanography) (published in 2019 by Texas A&M University Press) ISBN 978-1-62349-774-3
- Deltas and Humans: A Long Relationship Now Threatened by Global Change. Oxford University Press. 2016. ISBN 978-0-19-976417-4.
- Biogeochemical Dynamics at Major River-Coastal Interfaces: Linkages with Global Change. Cambridge University Press. 2014. ISBN 978-1-107-02257-7.
- Chemical Biomarkers in Aquatic Ecosystems. Princeton University Press. 2011. ISBN 978-1-4008-3910-0.
- Hypoxia in the Northern Gulf of Mexico. Springer. 2010. ISBN 978-1-60615-037-5.
- Biogeochemistry of Estuaries. Oxford University Press. 2006. ISBN 978-0-19-534771-5.
- Biogeochemistry of Gulf of Mexico Estuaries. John Wiley & Sons. 1998. ISBN 978-0-471-16174-5.

== Selected publications ==
Bianchi has published over 300 articles.

- Crotty, Sinéad M.; Ortals, Collin; Pettengill, Thomas M.; Shi, Luming; Olabarrieta, Maitane; Joyce, Matthew A.; Altieri, Andrew H.; Morrison, Elise; Bianchi, Thomas S.; Craft, Christopher; Bertness, Mark D.; Angelini, Christine (28 July 2020). "Sea-level rise and the emergence of a keystone grazer alter the geomorphic evolution and ecology of southeast US salt marshes". Proceedings of the National Academy of Sciences. 117 (30): 17891–17902. Bibcode:2020PNAS..11717891C. doi:10.1073/pnas.1917869117. PMC 7395507. PMID 32661151.
- Bianchi, Thomas S.; Cui, Xingqian; Blair, Neal E.; Burdige, David J.; Eglinton, Timothy I.; Galy, Valier (2018). "Centers of organic carbon burial and oxidation at the land-ocean interface". Organic Geochemistry. 115: 138–155. Bibcode:2018OrGeo.115..138B. doi:10.1016/j.orggeochem.2017.09.008.
- Shields, Michael R.; Bianchi, Thomas S.; Mohrig, David; Hutchings, Jack A.; Kenney, William F.; Kolker, Alexander S.; Curtis, Jason H. (November 2017). "Carbon storage in the Mississippi River delta enhanced by environmental engineering". Nature Geoscience. 10 (11): 846–851. Bibcode:2017NatGe..10..846S. doi:10.1038/ngeo3044.
- Smith, Richard W.; Bianchi, Thomas S.; Allison, Mead; Savage, Candida; Galy, Valier (June 2015). "High rates of organic carbon burial in fjord sediments globally". Nature Geoscience. 8 (6): 450–453. Bibcode:2015NatGe...8..450S. doi:10.1038/ngeo2421.
- Bauer, James E.; Cai, Wei-Jun; Raymond, Peter A.; Bianchi, Thomas S.; Hopkinson, Charles S.; Regnier, Pierre A. G. (5 December 2013). "The changing carbon cycle of the coastal ocean". Nature. 504 (7478): 61–70. Bibcode:2013Natur.504...61B. doi:10.1038/nature12857. PMID 24305149. S2CID 4399374. Archived from the original on June 1, 2020.
- Bianchi, Thomas S. (6 December 2011). "The role of terrestrially derived organic carbon in the coastal ocean: A changing paradigm and the priming effect". Proceedings of the National Academy of Sciences. 108 (49): 19473–19481. Bibcode:2011PNAS..10819473B. doi:10.1073/pnas.1017982108. PMC 3241778. PMID 22106254.
- Bianchi, T. S.; DiMarco, S. F.; Cowan, J. H.; Hetland, R. D.; Chapman, P.; Day, J. W.; Allison, M. A. (March 2010). "The science of hypoxia in the Northern Gulf of Mexico: A review". Science of the Total Environment. 408 (7): 1471–1484. Bibcode:2010ScTEn.408.1471B. doi:10.1016/j.scitotenv.2009.11.047. PMID 20092873.
- Bianchi, Thomas S.; Allison, Mead A. (19 May 2009). "Large-river delta-front estuaries as natural 'recorders' of global environmental change". Proceedings of the National Academy of Sciences. 106 (20): 8085–8092. Bibcode:2009PNAS..106.8085B. doi:10.1073/pnas.0812878106. PMC 2688901. PMID 19435849.
- Bianchi, Thomas S.; Filley, Timothy; Dria, Karl; Hatcher, Patrick G. (March 2004). "Temporal variability in sources of dissolved organic carbon in the lower Mississippi river". Geochimica et Cosmochimica Acta. 68 (5): 959–967. Bibcode:2004GeCoA..68..959B. doi:10.1016/j.gca.2003.07.011.
- Bianchi, Thomas S.; Engelhaupt, Erika; Westman, Per; Andrén, Thomas; Rolff, Carl; Elmgren, Ragnar (May 2000). "Cyanobacterial blooms in the Baltic Sea: Natural or human-induced?". Limnology and Oceanography. 45 (3): 716–726. Bibcode:2000LimOc..45..716B. doi:10.4319/lo.2000.45.3.0716. S2CID 84428521.
- Wetzel, Robert G.; Hatcher, Patrick G.; Bianchi, Thomas S. (December 1995). "Natural photolysis by ultraviolet irradiance of recalcitrant dissolved organic matter to simple substrates for rapidbacterial metabolism". Limnology and Oceanography. 40 (8): 1369–1380. Bibcode:1995LimOc..40.1369W. doi:10.4319/lo.1995.40.8.1369.
