= Alhassan Koroma =

Sierra Leonean footballer

Personal information
- Full name: Alhassan Koroma
- Date of birth: 9 June 2000 (age 26)
- Place of birth: Yoni Chiefdom, Sierra Leone
- Height: 1.82 m (6 ft 0 in)
- Position: Winger

Senior career*
| Years | Team | Apps | (Gls) |
| –2018 | Marampa Stars | | |
| 2019–2020 | East End Lions | | |
| 2019–2020 | → Linense (loan) | 18 | (3) |
| 2020–2023 | Linense | 85 | (11) |
| 2023–2025 | Al Shahaniya | 19 | (8) |
| 2025– | Baniyas | 16 | (1) |

International career^{‡}
| 2018– | Sierra Leone | 22 | (3) |
- * Club domestic league appearances and goals as of 8:15, 04 March 2026 (UTC) ‡ National team caps and goals as of 9 September 2025

Alhassan Koroma (born 9 June 2000) is a Sierra Leonean professional footballer who plays for the Sierra Leone national team as a forward.

On 3 October 2025, Koroma joined UAE Pro League club Baniyas.

== International career ==
Koroma made his full international debut on 17 March 2018 against Iran.

=== International ===
Appearances and goals by national team and year
| National team | Year | Apps | Goals |
|---|---|---|---|
Sierra Leone
| Sierra Leone | 2018 | 1 | 0 |
| Sierra Leone | 2020 | 3 | 0 |
| Sierra Leone | 2021 | 2 | 0 |
| Sierra Leone | 2023 | 7 | 1 |
| Sierra Leone | 2024 | 5 | 1 |
| Sierra Leone | 2025 | 4 | 1 |
| Total | | 22 | 3 |

Scores and results list Kenya's goal tally first, score column indicates score after each Koroma goal.

List of international goals scored by Alhassan Koroma
| No. | Date | Venue | Opponent | Score | Result | Competition |
|---|---|---|---|---|---|---|
| 1 | 26 March 2023 | Adrar Stadium, Agadir, Morocco | São Tomé and Príncipe | 2–0 | 2–0 | 2025 Africa Cup of Nations qualification |
| 2 | 11 October 2024 | Laurent Pokou Stadium, San-Pédro, Ivory Coast | Ivory Coast | 1–1 | 1–4 | 2025 Africa Cup of Nations qualification |
| 3 | 9 September 2025 | Samuel Kanyon Doe Sports Complex, Monrovia, Liberia | Ethiopia | 2–0 | 2–0 | 2026 FIFA World Cup qualification |

== Personal life ==
His twin brother Alusine Koroma is also a footballer.
