= Alusine Koroma =

Sierra Leone footballer

Personal information
- Full name: Alusine Koroma
- Date of birth: 9 June 1997 (age 29)
- Place of birth: Yoni Chiefdom, Sierra Leone
- Position: Attacking midfielder

Team information
- Current team: Orihuela

Senior career*
Years	Team	Apps	(Gls)
2016–2018	Marampa Stars		
2019–2021	East End Lions		
2021–2023	Linense	21	(0)
2021–2022	→ San Pedro (loan)	17	(0)
2023–2024	Vélez	16	(0)
2024–	Orihuela	18	(0)

International career^{‡}
2018–	Sierra Leone	12	(0)
- * Club domestic league appearances and goals as of 14:22, 14 October 2024 (UTC) ‡ National team caps and goals as of 14:22, 14 October 2024 (UTC)

Alusine Koroma (born 9 June 1997) is a Sierra Leonean professional footballer who plays as an attacking midfielder for Spanish club Orihuela and the Sierra Leone national team.

== Club career ==
In 2019 Koroma was part of the East End Lions team that won the Sierra Leone National Premier League. In July 2019 he went on trial with Spanish club Real Balompédica Linense, the club where his twin brother Alhassan had already signed. He went on to sign for the club and made his debut for the reserve team in February 2021 against CD Alcalá Del Valle. In June 2021 both Koroma brothers signed a three-year contract extension with Linense.

== International career ==
Koroma made his senior international debut on 17 March 2018 in a friendly against Iran.

== Personal life ==
His twin brother Alhassan Koroma is also a footballer.
