= Real Balompédica Linense =

Association football club

Linense
- Full name: Real Balompédica Linense
- Nickname: Balona
- Founded: 1912; 114 years ago
- Ground: Municipal La Línea, La Línea, Andalusia, Spain
- Capacity: 16,120
- President: Raffaele Pandalone
- Head coach: David Sánchez
- League: Tercera Federación – Group 10
- 2025–26: Tercera Federación – Group 10, 6th of 18
- Website: rbl1912.com
| Home colours | Away colours | Third colours |

Real Balompédica Linense is a Spanish football team based in La Línea de la Concepción, in the autonomous community of Andalusia. Founded in 1912 it plays in Tercera Federación – Group 10, holding home matches at Estadio Municipal de La Línea de la Concepción with a capacity of 16,120 seats.

== History ==
=== Founding years ===
Real Balompédica Linense's original date of founding is somewhat disputed with the club and current chairman believing it to have been formed on 12 September 1912. This is now commonly accepted due to a document of the Andalusia Football Federation which had this date in its official yearbook. However prior to this document being rediscovered it was believed to have been founded in 1921 when it was registered and started competing. The club was a merger of several amateur clubs from La Línea and possibly Gibraltar. On 8 December 1921 Balompédica Linense played and won its debut match, played against Club Racing Santander. 9 months later, on 5 September 1922, the club joined the South Regional Federation. In the same year the club also added the distinction of Real to its name, thus creating the present name of Real Balompédica Linense. For the first years of competition the club played its matches at the Aurora Sports Field. As the club began participation in official competitions it became necessary for it to have a custom field. Thus the club opened the San Bernardo Estadio, playing its first match at the ground on 17 October 1926, being defeated 2–1 by FC Malagueño.

=== Glory years ===
The club started its life jumping between the Regional División and Tercera División. The club's fortunes began to change however in the 1950s, when the club gained promotion to the Segunda División in the 1949–50 season. The club managed to avoid relegation with a respectable 12th-place finish in its first season in the Spanish second flight. This season proved to be the first of six straight seasons in the Segunda División for Balona, ending with relegations to the Tercera División at the end of the 1954–55 season.

=== Promotion to Segunda B ===
Following its stint in the second flight, Balona returned to the Tercera División where it stayed for 28 years, bar one in the 1976–77 season where it returned to the Regional División. Following several consistent high finishing seasons the 1982–83 season proved a success for Balona with it coming first in the Tercera División and gaining promotion to the recently created Segunda División B. The club had another extended period in a single league, this time being 10 years. During these ten years the club managed a second-place finish in the 1985–86 season, however this wasn't enough to see it gain promotion to the Segunda División.

=== Back to Tercera ===
Despite the club's high finishes in some seasons throughout its initial 10-year stint in the Segunda División it was relegated in the 1992–93 season back to the Tercera División. The club stayed in the Tercera División for another 6 seasons before, again, gaining promotion to the Segunda División B following a first-placed finish in the División due to a last match of the season win. This proved to be the start of the club having a period of short stints in the Tercera and Segunda B, with 3 seasons in the Segunda B (1999–2000 – 2001–02), 6 in the Tercera (2002–03 – 2007–08), 1 in the Segunda B (2008–09) and 2 in the Tercera (2009–10, 2010–11). A notable occurrence during these string of promotions and relegations was the arrival of Alfredo Gallardo as the chairman of the club in the 2002/03 season. Gallardo still holds this position and on his arrival also brought in several local businessmen to help fund the club. A second notable occurrence was in the 2007–08 season with the club going through qualifications for promotion after a third-place finish. This saw the club defeat CD Anguiano due to the away goals rule before having a dramatic conclusion to the qualification with a double tie against CD Mirandes. The first match played in La Linea de la Concepcion ended in a 1–1 result meaning CD Mirandes were ahead on the away goals rule. However the result was completely turned around on the return leg at Estadio Municipal de Anduva, Miranda de Ebro with the match ending 3–3, and thus Balona winning promotion on the away goal rule. The club currently is in the Segunda B following a first-placed finish in the Tercera División in 2010–11. The club achieved a high finish, second, the season following its promotion and backed this up with a solid sixth-placed finish in the 2012–13 season. The next 2013–14 season was almost the same by result, as the club finished 7th.

== Season to season ==
| Season | Tier | Division | Place | Copa del Rey |
|---|---|---|---|---|
| 1934–35 | 5 | 1ª Reg. | 3rd | |
| 1935–36 | 5 | 1ª Reg. B | 3rd | |
| 1939–40 | 5 | 1ª Reg. B | 1st | |
| 1940–41 | 3 | 3ª | 4th | |
| 1941–42 | 3 | 1ª Reg. | 5th | |
| 1942–43 | 3 | 1ª Reg. | 6th | |
| 1943–44 | 3 | 3ª | 9th | |
| 1944–45 | 3 | 3ª | 7th | |
| 1945–46 | 3 | 3ª | 5th | |
| 1946–47 | 3 | 3ª | 8th | |
| 1947–48 | 3 | 3ª | 3rd | |
| 1948–49 | 3 | 3ª | 3rd | |
| 1949–50 | 2 | 2ª | 12th | |
| 1950–51 | 2 | 2ª | 9th | |
| 1951–52 | 2 | 2ª | 11th | |
| 1952–53 | 2 | 2ª | 10th | |
| 1953–54 | 2 | 2ª | 10th | |
| 1954–55 | 2 | 2ª | 16th | |
| 1955–56 | 3 | 3ª | 2nd | |
| 1956–57 | 3 | 3ª | 5th | |

| Season | Tier | Division | Place | Copa del Rey |
|---|---|---|---|---|
| 1957–58 | 3 | 3ª | 5th | |
| 1958–59 | 3 | 3ª | 12th | |
| 1959–60 | 3 | 3ª | 3rd | |
| 1960–61 | 3 | 3ª | 5th | |
| 1961–62 | 3 | 3ª | 3rd | |
| 1962–63 | 3 | 3ª | 7th | |
| 1963–64 | 3 | 3ª | 3rd | |
| 1964–65 | 3 | 3ª | 2nd | |
| 1965–66 | 3 | 3ª | 1st | |
| 1966–67 | 3 | 3ª | 3rd | |
| 1967–68 | 3 | 3ª | 1st | |
| 1968–69 | 3 | 3ª | 8th | |
| 1969–70 | 3 | 3ª | 8th | |
| 1970–71 | 3 | 3ª | 16th | |
| 1971–72 | 3 | 3ª | 7th | |
| 1972–73 | 3 | 3ª | 16th | |
| 1973–74 | 3 | 3ª | 5th | |
| 1974–75 | 3 | 3ª | 13th | |
| 1975–76 | 3 | 3ª | 19th | |
| 1976–77 | 4 | Reg. Pref. | 2nd | |

| Season | Tier | Division | Place | Copa del Rey |
|---|---|---|---|---|
| 1977–78 | 4 | 3ª | 3rd | |
| 1978–79 | 4 | 3ª | 3rd | |
| 1979–80 | 4 | 3ª | 2nd | |
| 1980–81 | 4 | 3ª | 13th | |
| 1981–82 | 4 | 3ª | 10th | |
| 1982–83 | 4 | 3ª | 1st | |
| 1983–84 | 3 | 2ª B | 15th | |
| 1984–85 | 3 | 2ª B | 4th | |
| 1985–86 | 3 | 2ª B | 2nd | |
| 1986–87 | 3 | 2ª B | 8th | |
| 1987–88 | 3 | 2ª B | 11th | |
| 1988–89 | 3 | 2ª B | 14th | |
| 1989–90 | 3 | 2ª B | 14th | |
| 1990–91 | 3 | 2ª B | 16th | |
| 1991–92 | 3 | 2ª B | 4th | |
| 1992–93 | 3 | 2ª B | 18th | |
| 1993–94 | 4 | 3ª | 10th | |
| 1994–95 | 4 | 3ª | 6th | |
| 1995–96 | 4 | 3ª | 10th | |
| 1996–97 | 4 | 3ª | 13th | |

| Season | Tier | Division | Place | Copa del Rey |
|---|---|---|---|---|
| 1997–98 | 4 | 3ª | 11th | |
| 1998–99 | 4 | 3ª | 1st | |
| 1999–2000 | 3 | 2ª B | 8th | |
| 2000–01 | 3 | 2ª B | 13th | |
| 2001–02 | 3 | 2ª B | 17th | |
| 2002–03 | 4 | 3ª | 10th | |
| 2003–04 | 4 | 3ª | 3rd | |
| 2004–05 | 4 | 3ª | 4th | |
| 2005–06 | 4 | 3ª | 4th | |
| 2006–07 | 4 | 3ª | 5th | |
| 2007–08 | 4 | 3ª | 3rd | |
| 2008–09 | 3 | 2ª B | 19th | |
| 2009–10 | 4 | 3ª | 5th | |
| 2010–11 | 4 | 3ª | 1st | |
| 2011–12 | 3 | 2ª B | 2nd | |
| 2012–13 | 3 | 2ª B | 6th | |
| 2013–14 | 3 | 2ª B | 7th | |
| 2014–15 | 3 | 2ª B | 6th | Third round |
| 2015–16 | 3 | 2ª B | 11th | Round of 32 |
| 2016–17 | 3 | 2ª B | 9th | |

| Season | Tier | Division | Place | Copa del Rey |
|---|---|---|---|---|
| 2017–18 | 3 | 2ª B | 11th | |
| 2018–19 | 3 | 2ª B | 12th | |
| 2019–20 | 3 | 2ª B | 7th | |
| 2020–21 | 3 | 2ª B | 4th / 2nd | First round |
| 2021–22 | 3 | 1ª RFEF | 12th | |
| 2022–23 | 3 | 1ª Fed. | 18th | |
| 2023–24 | 4 | 2ª Fed. | 9th | |
| 2024–25 | 4 | 2ª Fed. | 14th | |
| 2025–26 | 5 | 3ª Fed. | 6th | |
| 2026–27 | 5 | 3ª Fed. | | |

- 6 seasons in Segunda División
- 2 seasons in Primera Federación/Primera División RFEF
- 24 seasons in Segunda División B
- 2 seasons in Segunda Federación
- 48 seasons in Tercera División
- 2 seasons in Tercera Federación

== Current squad ==
As of 6 February 2023.

Note: Flags indicate national team as defined under FIFA eligibility rules; some limited exceptions apply. Players may hold more than one non-FIFA nationality.

| No. | Pos. | Nation | Player |
|---|---|---|---|
| 1 | GK | ESP | Alberto Varo |
| 4 | DF | ESP | Jesús Muñoz |
| 5 | DF | ESP | Fran Morante |
| 6 | MF | ESP | José Masllorens |
| 7 | MF | ESP | Loren Fernández |
| 8 | FW | ENG | Bobby Duncan |
| 10 | MF | SLE | Alhassan Koroma |
| 11 | DF | ENG | Connor Ruane |
| 12 | MF | FRA | Yassin Fekir (on loan from Real Betis) |
| 13 | GK | ESP | Ángel de la Calzada |
| 14 | MF | ESP | Joel del Pino (on loan from Las Palmas) |

| No. | Pos. | Nation | Player |
|---|---|---|---|
| 15 | DF | ESP | Borja López |
| 16 | MF | ESP | Antonio Romero |
| 17 | FW | ESP | Gerard Oliva |
| 18 | MF | ESP | Álex Guti |
| 19 | MF | ESP | Toni García |
| 20 | DF | ARG | Nicolás Delmonte (captain) |
| 21 | MF | BRA | João Pedro |
| 22 | FW | ESP | Omar Perdomo |
| 26 | FW | SLE | Alusine Koroma |
| 27 | DF | MLI | Papa Bamory Camara |

=== Reserve team ===
Note: Flags indicate national team as defined under FIFA eligibility rules; some limited exceptions apply. Players may hold more than one non-FIFA nationality.

| No. | Pos. | Nation | Player |
|---|---|---|---|
| 25 | MF | ESP | Javi Méndez |
| 28 | FW | ESP | Cipri |

=== Out on loan ===
Note: Flags indicate national team as defined under FIFA eligibility rules; some limited exceptions apply. Players may hold more than one non-FIFA nationality.

| No. | Pos. | Nation | Player |
|---|---|---|---|
| — | DF | SRB | Damjan Gojkov (at Torremolinos until 30 June 2023) |
| — | FW | ESP | Manu Toledano (at Alcalá until 30 June 2023) |
