= Mauri (Brazilian footballer) =

Brazilian footballer

Personal information
- Full name: Mauri Franco Barbosa da Silva
- Date of birth: 6 March 1993 (age 33)
- Place of birth: Catu, Brazil
- Height: 1.71 m (5 ft 7 1/2 in)
- Position: Midfielder

Team information
- Current team: Jacuipense

Youth career
- Vitória

Senior career*
Years	Team	Apps	(Gls)
2014–2017	Vitória	3	(0)
2014	→ Icasa (loan)	12	(0)
2015–2016	→ Linense (loan)	35	(3)
2016–2017	Linense	31	(2)
2018	Linense	9	(0)
2019–	Jacuipense	0	(0)
2019	→ Serra (loan)	6	(0)
- * Club domestic league appearances and goals as of 22:27, 26 April 2020 (UTC)

Mauri Franco Barbosa da Silva (born 6 March 1993), simply known as Mauri, is a Brazilian footballer who plays for Jacuipense as a defensive midfielder.

== Club career ==
Born in Catu, Bahia, Mauri represented Vitória as a youth. He made his first team debut on 9 February 2014, starting in a 4–1 Campeonato Baiano away win against Serrano.

Mauri made his Série A debut on 27 April 2014, coming on as a second half substitute for Caio in a 2–2 home draw against Atlético Paranaense. On 11 September, he was loaned to Icasa until the end of the year.

On 6 August 2015 Mauri moved abroad, signing a one-year loan deal with Spanish Segunda División B club Real Balompédica Linense.
