= Sergio Rodríguez (footballer, born 1928) =

Uruguayan footballer

Personal information
- Full name: Sergio Rodríguez Viera
- Date of birth: 4 April 1928
- Place of birth: Colonia del Sacramento, Uruguay
- Date of death: 6 April 1986 (aged 58)
- Place of death: Alicante, Spain
- Position: Midfielder

Senior career*
Years	Team	Apps	(Gls)
1946–1949	Rampla Juniors		
1949–1951	Stade Français	17	(6)
1950–1953	Málaga	70	(27)
1953–1954	Real Madrid	5	(0)
1954–1958	Hércules		
1958–1960	Alicante		
1960–1961	Orihuela Deportiva		
1961–1962	Alicante		

Managerial career
- 1955: Hércules (caretaker)
- 1957: Hércules
- 1958: Hércules (caretaker)
- 1959–1960: Alicante
- 1960–1961: Orihuela Deportiva
- 1962–1963: UD Tabernes
- 1964–1965: Monóvar CD
- 1965–1966: Orihuela Deportiva
- 1966–1967: Hércules (assistant)
- 1967–1968: Hércules
- 1968–1969: Mallorca
- 1971–1972: Español San Vicente
- 1973–1975: Alicante
- 1975–1978: UD Onil
- 1979–1981: Crevillente
- 1981–1982: Baza
- 1982–1983: Caravaca
- 1984–1985: Castalla CF
- 1986: Callosa Deportiva
- * Club domestic league appearances and goals

Sergio Rodríguez Viera (4 April 1928 – 6 April 1986) was a Uruguayan footballer who played as a midfielder, and football manager.

== Playing career ==
Rodríguez played for the Uruguayan Primera División, French Ligue 1, and Spanish La Liga. After good seasons with Rampla Juniors played two seasons with the Stade Français which struggled to avoid relegation. In three seasons with CD Málaga where he scored goals, he signed for Real Madrid C.F. In Madrid played 5 league games. In the 1954–55 season he joined to Hércules CF where he spent 4 seasons at a good level. He was in Hércules where he started as player–manager on an interim basis. He later played on the third level with Alicante CF and Orihuela Deportiva CF, where he also served as player-coach these teams.

== Coaching career ==
Then began a coaching career that led him to spend practically all categories of Spanish football. In the 1968–69 season reached promotion to RCD Mallorca in La Liga.

== Personal ==
Rodríguez' brother, Héctor Rodríguez Viera, was also a footballer, in teams as Club Nacional de Football.
