= Estadio Municipal de La Línea de la Concepción =

Stadium in La Línea de la Concepción, Spain

Municipal
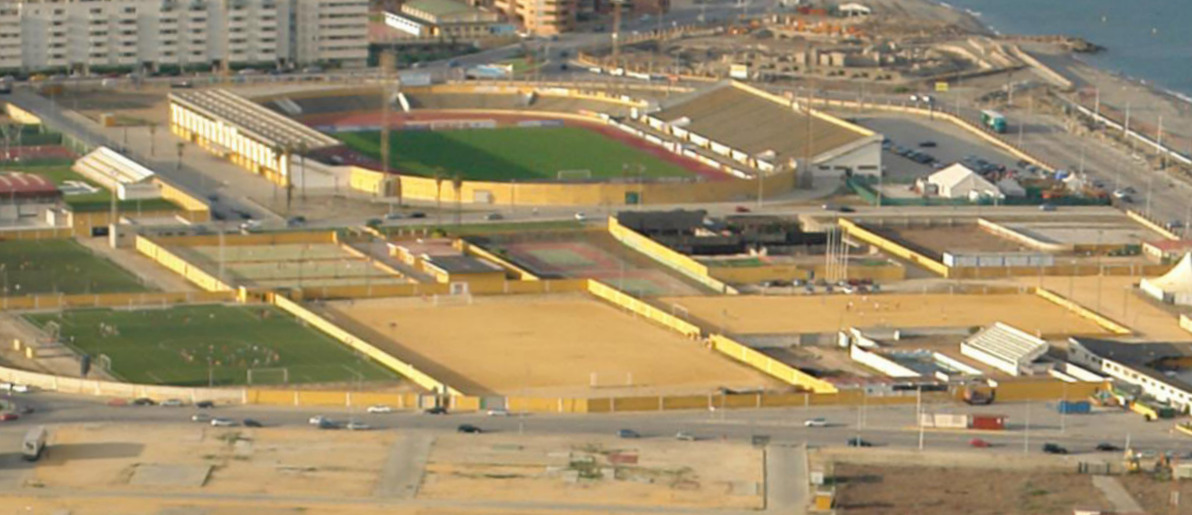
- Estadio Municipal de La Línea de la Concepción
- Interactive map of Municipal
- Full name: Estadio Municipal de La Línea de la Concepción
- Location: La Línea de la Concepción, Spain
- Coordinates: 36°09′30.6″N 5°20′24.9″W
- Capacity: 10,800
- Surface: Grass
- Field size: 105 m × 70 m (344 ft × 230 ft)

Construction
- Opened: 1969
- Renovated: 2021-2024

Tenant
- Real Balompédica Linense

The Estadio Municipal de La Línea de la Concepción is a 10,800-capacity stadium located in La Línea de la Concepción, Cádiz Province, Spain. It is currently used for football matches and is the home stadium of Real Balompédica Linense.

On 15 October 1969, it hosted Spain's 6–0 win over Finland in the 1970 FIFA World Cup qualification. On 7 June 1984, Spain played a friendly against Yugoslavia at the ground, and lost 0–1. On 21 March 2018, Andorra played a friendly against Liechtenstein, in which the former won 1–0.

In 2024, it hosted Spain under 21's two matches. The first one was a victory over Kazakhstan (4-3) in an official match and the second one was a friendly match against England (0-0).

In June 2026, the stadium also hosted an official friendly match between Northern Ireland and Guinea.
