= José Luis Duque =

Spanish footballer (1918–1991)

Personal information
- Full name: José Luis Duque González
- Date of birth: 27 October 1918
- Place of birth: Bilbao, Spain
- Date of death: 9 November 1991 (aged 73)
- Place of death: Bilbao, Spain
- Position: Forward

Senior career*
Years	Team	Apps	(Gls)
1939–1940	Salamanca		
1940–1941	Real Valladolid		
1941–1942	Salamanca		
1942–1943	Athletic Bilbao	11	(11)
1943	Arenas de Getxo		
1943–1944	Athletic Bilbao	10	(8)
1944–1945	Espanyol	13	(6)
1945–1946	→ Reus Deportiu (on loan)		
1945–1946	→ Salamanca (on loan)		
1946–1947	Racing de Santander		
1947–1950	Gimnástica de Torrelavega		
1950–1951	Eibar		
Total		35	(26)
- * Club domestic league appearances and goals

José Luis Duque González (27 October 1918 – 9 November 1991) was a Spanish footballer who played as a forward for Athletic Bilbao and Espanyol in the 1940s.

== Career ==
Born in the Biscayan town of Bilbao on 27 October 1918, Duque began his career in 1939, playing one season for Salamanca (1939–40), Real Valladolid (1940–41), and Salamanca again (1941–42). In 1942, he joined Athletic Bilbao, making his debut on 27 September, in a 5–0 La Liga win over Real Betis.

Together with Agustín Gainza, Francisco Gárate, and Telmo Zarra, he was a member of the Bilbao team that won the doubles in 1943, playing a small role in the team's triumph in the Copa del Rey, as he was used in only one match in the round of 16, but playing a crucial role in La Liga, scoring 11 goals in 11 matches, the club's third-highest goalscoring league tally, only behind José Luis Panizo (12) and Zarra (16). He stayed with Bilbao for two years, from 1942 until 1944, scoring a total of 19 goals in 22 matches. During his time at Bilbao, he also played one Segunda División match for Arenas de Getxo in the 1943–44 season.

In 1944, Duque signed for Espanyol, where he scored 8 goals in 14 official matches in his first season. Despite some encouraging first steps at Espanyol, he did not play a single game for them in his second year there, as he was loaned to Reus Deportiu until November, and then to Salamanca for the rest of the season. In total, he scored 26 goals in 35 La Liga matches for Athletic and Espanyol. Following a one-season stint at Racing de Santander (1946-47), he joined Gimnástica de Torrelavega, with whom he played for two years, from 1948 until 1950, when he joined Eibar, where he retired in 1951, aged 33.

== Death ==
Duque died on 9 November 1991, at the age of 73.

== Honours ==
Athletic Bilbao

- La Liga:
  - Champions (1): 1942–43
- Copa del Rey:
  - Champions (1): 1943
