= Hugo Rodríguez (footballer, born 1989) =

Spanish footballer

Personal information
- Full name: Hugo Rodríguez Romero
- Date of birth: 30 December 1989 (age 36)
- Place of birth: Jerez de la Frontera, Spain
- Height: 1.82 m (6 ft 0 in)
- Position: Winger

Team information
- Current team: Racing Portuense

Youth career
- 2003–2004: Cádiz
- 2004–2008: Sevilla

Senior career*
Years	Team	Apps	(Gls)
2008–2009	Sevilla C	16	(6)
2008–2012	Sevilla B	78	(7)
2012–2013	Osasuna B	35	(6)
2013–2014	Real Unión	32	(4)
2014–2015	La Hoya Lorca	21	(9)
2015–2016	Cádiz	29	(4)
2016	→ Pontevedra (loan)	13	(1)
2016–2017	Mérida	31	(8)
2017–2018	Cartagena	40	(4)
2018–2019	Cultural Leonesa	29	(7)
2019–2021	San Fernando	49	(9)
2021–2023	Atlético Baleares	40	(3)
2023–2024	Marbella	33	(7)
2024–2025	Estepona	24	(1)
2025–	Racing Portuense	1	(0)
- * Club domestic league appearances and goals as of 21 September 2025

Hugo Rodríguez Romero (born 30 December 1989), sometimes known simply as Hugo, is a Spanish footballer who plays for División de Honor Andaluza club Racing Portuense as a winger.

== Club career ==
Born in Jerez de la Frontera, Andalusia, Rodríguez graduated with Sevilla FC's youth setup. He made his senior debuts with the C-team in the 2008–09 campaign, in Tercera División.

On 22 November 2008 Hugo played his first match as a professional, playing the entire second half and scoring the reserves' only in a 1–2 home loss against Xerez CD in the Segunda División championship. He appeared in 23 matches, with his side being relegated.

On 17 May 2012, after appearing regularly for Sevilla Atlético in Segunda División B, Rodríguez moved to another reserve team, CA Osasuna B also in the third level. He subsequently resumed his career in the same division, representing Real Unión, La Hoya Lorca CF, Cádiz CF, Pontevedra CF (on loan), Mérida AD, FC Cartagena and Cultural y Deportiva Leonesa.

On 17 August 2024, Rodríguez signed with Estepona in Segunda Federación.
