= Connor Ruane =

English footballer

Personal information
- Full name: Connor James Ruane
- Date of birth: 15 November 1993 (age 32)
- Place of birth: Manchester, England
- Height: 1.78 m (5 ft 10 in)
- Position: Full back

Team information
- Current team: Jaén
- Number: 3

Youth career
- Everton

Senior career*
Years	Team	Apps	(Gls)
2013–2014	Constància	26	(0)
2014–2015	Mallorca B	23	(0)
2015–2019	Hércules	44	(1)
2016–2017	→ La Roda (loan)	29	(0)
2019	FC Jumilla	11	(1)
2019–2020	Inter Turku	28	(4)
2021–2022	Lokomotiv Plovdiv	21	(0)
2022–2023	Linense	29	(0)
2023–2024	Talavera de la Reina	33	(0)
2024–2025	Linense	21	(0)
2025–	Jaén	7	(0)
- * Club domestic league appearances and goals as of 7 May 2026

Connor James Ruane (born 15 November 1993) is an English professional footballer who plays as a midfielder for Spanish Segunda Federación club Jaén.

== Early and personal life ==
Ruane moved from Warrington to Spain when he was 9 years old.

== Career ==
After playing in Spain and representing Constància, Mallorca B, Hércules, La Roda and Jumilla in the country's third-tier, Ruane moved to Finland in August 2019 and signed with FC Inter Turku in Veikkausliiga. His deal with Inter Turku was extended for the 2020 season.

In January 2021 he signed for Lokomotiv Plovdiv in Bulgarian First League. He moved to Spanish club Linense in January 2022.
