= Esteban Echevarría =

Spanish footballer (1923–1987)

Personal information
- Full name: Esteban Echevarría Olabarrieta
- Date of birth: 16 January 1923
- Place of birth: Deusto, Spain
- Date of death: 24 February 1987 (aged 64)
- Place of death: Spain
- Position: Forward

Senior career*
Years	Team	Apps	(Gls)
1941–1942	Indautxu		
1942–1951	Real Oviedo		
1951–1952	Gimnàstic de Tarragona		
1952–1953	Indautxu		
- * Club domestic league appearances and goals

Esteban Echevarría Olabarrieta (16 January 1923 – 24 February 1987) was a Spanish footballer who played as a forward for Real Oviedo in the 1940s.

== Club career ==
Born on 16 January 1923 in Deusto, Echevarría began his career at his hometown club Indautxu, remaining there until 15 July 1942, when he joined Real Oviedo, then in La Liga. A few months later, on 8 November, he took advantage of Antonio Chas' injury to make his official debut with the first team in a league away match against Sevilla, scoring twice to help his side to a 5–0 victory. He went on to score 14 goals in the first seven matchdays, thus setting a record for the best league start that stood for 72 years, being surpassed only by Cristiano Ronaldo in the 2014–15 season. That season, Echevarría scored 25 goals, finishing behind only Valencia's Mundo, who scored 28.

On 16 September 1944, Echevarría was heading to watch a bullfight during the Fiestas de San Mateo in Oviedo when he got hit by a car and subsequently suffered traumatic pleurisy, which forced him to stay away from the pitch for almost the entire 1944–45 season, and then failed to score a single goal in the 1945–46 season. On 21 December 1947, he became the first (and only) player to score a five-goal haul against Real Madrid in an official match, doing so in a league fixture at the Buenavista stadium in Oviedo, to help his side to a 7–1 victory.

His career, however, was halted by another serious injury, this time permanently, leaving Oviedo in 1951, having scored 82 goals for the club, including 64 goals in 81 La Liga matches. He then joined Gimnàstic de Tarragona, where he retired in 1952, aged 29.

== Death ==
Echevarría died on 24 February 1987, at the age of 83.

== See also ==
- List of La Liga hat-tricks
