= Los Cármenes =

Coordinates: 40°24′25″N 3°43′35″W

- City neighborhood
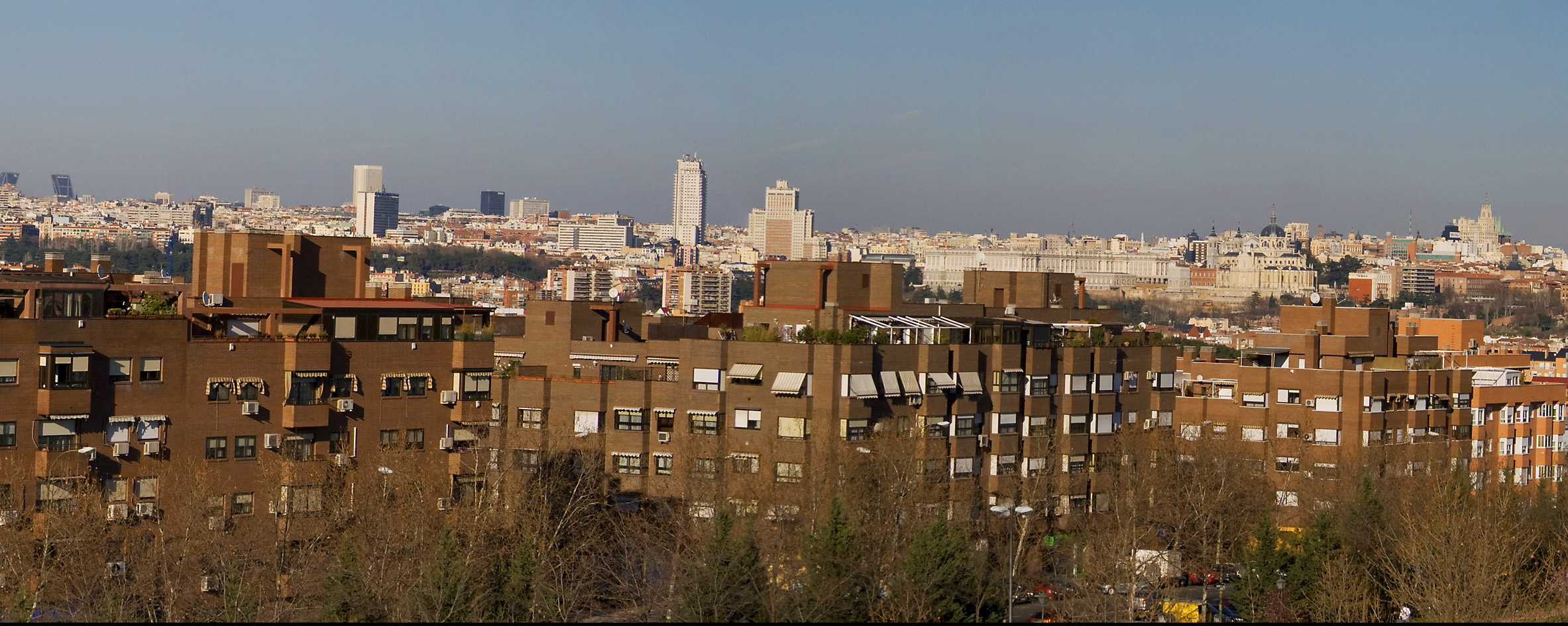
- Interactive map of Los Cármenes
- Country: Spain
- Region: Community of Madrid
- Municipality: Madrid
- District: Latina

Los Cármenes is an administrative neighborhood (barrio) of Madrid belonging to the district of Latina.
