= Maitane Olabarrieta =

Spanish-American oceanographer

Maitane Olabarrieta Lizaso is a Spanish and American oceanographer and a specialist in coastal morphodynamics, the study of the interactions between coastal landforms and the motions of ocean water created by tides, currents, waves, and weather. She is a professor of civil and coastal engineering at the University of Florida, and associate director of the university's Center for Coastal Solutions.

== Education and career ==
Olabarrieta was a student of marine science at the University of Cantabria in Spain. After a 1999 bachelor's degree and 2003 master's degree, she completed her Ph.D. there in 2006.

In 2009 she became a postdoctoral researcher at the Woods Hole Coastal and Marine Science Center of the United States Geological Survey. She took her present position as a faculty member at the University of Florida in 2013.

== Recognition ==
Olabarrieta was a 2017 recipient of the Presidential Early Career Award for Scientists and Engineers, given "for her groundbreaking research aimed at understanding the interaction of multiple-stressors on coral reef ecosystems, using cutting-edge genomics approaches to identify mechanisms of coral resistance to disease, and developing educational programs that engage high school and undergraduate students in the research".
