= 1948–49 Tercera División =

Tercera División
- Season: 1948–49

The 1948–49 Tercera División was the 13th edition of the Spanish national third tier.

== Format ==
14 clubs in 6 geographic groups (84 clubs) participated. One, Maestranza Aérea León withdrew mid-season. The 6 group champions and 6-runners up were promoted as of right. The 6 group champions played off for the Tercera División championship. The 6 third placed teams and the two bottom Segunda División teams played-off for two places in the Segunda División. In the event the play-offs were unnecessary since Segunda División was expanded from one division of 14 clubs to two divisions of 16 clubs for season 1949–50. No teams were relegated from Segunda División and the top 3 in all 6 groups were promoted.

== Regular season ==
=== Group 1 ===
Pos	Team	Pld	W	D	L	GF	GA	GD	Pts	Promotion or qualification
1	Orensana	24	17	0	7	60	36	+24	34	Promotion to Segunda División
2	Arosa	24	14	5	5	61	40	+21	33	Promotion to Segunda División
3	Lucense	24	15	2	7	59	44	+15	32	Promotion/relegation phase
4	La Felguera	24	13	4	7	61	37	+24	30	
5	Avilés	24	12	6	6	68	44	+24	30	
6	Juvencia	24	9	5	10	53	39	+14	23	
7	Cultural Leonesa	24	10	3	11	49	54	−5	23	
8	Pontevedra	24	9	4	11	50	64	−14	22	
9	Caudal	24	7	8	9	45	50	−5	22	
10	Juvenil	24	7	5	12	46	50	−4	19	
11	Berbés	24	8	3	13	55	75	−20	19	
12	Santiago	24	6	6	12	37	60	−23	18	
13	Arsenal Ferrol	24	2	3	19	22	73	−51	5 (Note: 2 points deducted. Arsenal 3-2 Berbés and Lucense 2-3 Arsenal both awarded to Arsenal's opponents because Arsenal fielded ineligible players. One point deducted per match.)	
14	Maestranza Aérea	0	-	-	-	-	-	—	0	Withdrew

=== Group 2 ===
Pos	Team	Pld	W	D	L	GF	GA	GD	Pts	Promotion or qualification
1	Osasuna	26	16	7	3	69	27	+42	39	Promotion to Segunda División
2	Gim. Torrelavega	26	17	2	7	54	37	+17	36	Promotion to Segunda División
3	Erandio	26	12	4	10	55	41	+14	28	Promotion/relegation phase
4	Logroñés	26	11	5	10	50	52	−2	27	
5	Maestranza Aérea Logroño	26	9	7	10	45	49	−4	25	
6	Indauchu	26	11	3	12	63	67	−4	25	
7	Sestao	26	10	4	12	41	51	−10	24	
8	Mirandés	26	11	2	13	39	45	−6	24	
9	Barreda	26	9	6	11	49	62	−13	24	
10	Real Unión	26	11	1	14	50	45	+5	23	
11	Burgos	26	9	5	12	56	48	+8	22 (Note: 1 point deducted. Burgos played their substitute goalkeeper as an outfielder in a 3-1 home win v Logroñés. Illegal at the time. Match awarded to Logroñés.)	
12	Dep. Alavés	26	8	6	12	36	46	−10	22	
13	Arenas Guecho	26	7	8	11	48	60	−12	22	
14	Tudelano	26	10	2	14	42	67	−25	22	

=== Group 3 ===
Pos	Team	Pld	W	D	L	GF	GA	GD	Pts	Promotion or qualification
1	Lérida	26	16	5	5	57	36	+21	37	Promotion to Segunda División
2	Zaragoza	26	13	6	7	63	54	+9	32	Promotion to Segunda División
3	Mallorca	26	14	3	9	56	36	+20	31	Promotion/relegation phase
4	San Andrés	26	15	1	10	73	45	+28	31	
5	Tarrasa	26	10	6	10	67	64	+3	26	
6	Huesca	26	11	3	12	53	50	+3	25	
7	Constancia	26	11	3	12	44	53	−9	25	
8	Escoriaza	26	8	9	9	49	46	+3	25	
9	At. Baleares	26	8	8	10	53	59	−6	24	
10	Arenas Zaragoza	26	10	4	12	48	45	+3	24	
11	Júpiter	26	9	6	11	47	62	−15	24	
12	Martinenc	26	9	6	11	39	53	−14	24	
13	At. Zaragoza	26	9	1	16	37	66	−29	19	
14	Igualada	26	7	3	16	36	53	−17	17	

=== Group 4 ===
Pos	Team	Pld	W	D	L	GF	GA	GD	Pts	Promotion or qualification
1	Plus Ultra	26	17	4	5	90	39	+51	38	Promotion to Segunda División
2	Salamanca	26	15	7	4	50	27	+23	37	Promotion to Segunda División
3	Numancia	26	13	4	9	70	39	+31	30	Promotion/relegation phase
4	Toledo	26	12	6	8	62	58	+4	30	
5	Conquense	26	12	5	9	45	41	+4	29	
6	Badajoz	26	12	2	12	57	44	+13	26	
7	Tomelloso	26	12	2	12	48	61	−13	26	
8	Cacereño	26	10	5	11	55	53	+2	25	
9	Talavera	26	11	3	12	45	58	−13	25	
10	F.N. Palencia	26	10	4	12	50	47	+3	24	
11	Ávila	26	8	7	11	48	61	−13	23	
12	Manchego	26	6	6	14	37	58	−21	18	
13	Gim. Segoviana	26	6	5	15	34	76	−42	17	
14	At. Zamora	26	4	8	14	38	67	−29	16	

=== Group 5 ===
Pos	Team	Pld	W	D	L	GF	GA	GD	Pts	Promotion or qualification
1	Albacete	26	17	4	5	62	30	+32	38	Promotion to Segunda División
2	Elche	26	14	8	4	60	28	+32	36	Promotion to Segunda División
3	Cartagena	26	14	4	8	65	37	+28	32	Promotion/relegation phase
4	Imperial	26	13	3	10	55	43	+12	29	
5	Almería	26	13	2	11	57	51	+6	28	
6	Naval	26	13	2	11	50	47	+3	28	
7	Alicante	26	11	3	12	45	53	−8	25	
8	Segarra	26	11	3	12	36	49	−13	25	
9	Acero	26	11	3	12	42	51	−9	25	
10	Eldense	26	8	7	11	51	52	−1	22 (Note: 1 point deducted. Eldense fielded ineligible player in 3-2 win at Alicante. Match awarded to Alicante.)	
11	Olímpico Játiva	26	10	2	14	38	51	−13	22	
12	Orihuela	26	8	5	13	28	34	−6	21	
13	Sueca	26	6	4	16	28	61	−33	16	
14	Cieza	26	6	4	16	36	66	−30	16	

=== Group 6 ===
Pos	Team	Pld	W	D	L	GF	GA	GD	Pts	Promotion or qualification
1	At. Tetuán	26	16	2	8	52	26	+26	34	Promotion to Segunda División
2	Córdoba	26	16	2	8	62	30	+32	34	Promotion to Segunda División
3	Linense	26	15	4	7	72	38	+34	34	Promotion/relegation phase
4	Recreativo Huelva	26	13	6	7	55	42	+13	32	
5	Cádiz	26	12	6	8	56	41	+15	30	
6	Ceuta	26	13	2	11	47	50	−3	28	
7	Algeciras	26	12	2	12	58	62	−4	26	
8	Betis	26	10	5	11	60	42	+18	25	
9	España Tánger	26	8	7	11	46	63	−17	23	
10	Jaén	26	10	2	14	50	59	−9	22	
11	Iliturgi	26	10	2	14	57	75	−18	22	
12	Melilla	26	7	7	12	50	52	−2	21	
13	Electromecánicas	26	7	4	15	34	67	−33	18	
14	Larache	26	5	5	16	39	91	−52	15	

== Tercera División Fase Final ==
Pos	Team	Pld	W	D	L	GF	GA	GD	Pts
1	Albacete (C)	10	6	0	4	19	19	0	12
2	At. Tetuán	10	4	3	3	13	11	+2	11
3	Lérida	10	5	0	5	20	16	+4	10
4	Plus Ultra	10	4	1	5	20	25	−5	9
5	Orensana	10	4	1	5	19	22	−3	9
6	Osasuna	10	3	3	4	13	11	+2	9

(C) Champions
- Albacete was champion of Tercera División.

== Segunda División promotion/relegation phase ==
=== Group I ===
Pos	Team	Pld	W	D	L	GF	GA	GD	Pts
1	Numancia	6	4	0	2	14	17	−3	8
2	Ferrol	6	3	1	2	15	12	+3	7
3	Lucense	6	3	1	2	13	9	+4	7
4	Erandio	6	1	0	5	10	14	−4	2

This phase was canceled for the expansion of the Segunda División, all teams promoted.

=== Group II ===
Pos	Team	Pld	W	D	L	GF	GA	GD	Pts
1	Linense	6	3	1	2	13	11	+2	7
2	Mallorca	6	3	0	3	17	10	+7	6
3	Badalona	6	3	0	3	19	13	+6	6
4	Cartagena	6	2	1	3	11	26	−15	5

This phase was canceled for the expansion of the Segunda División, all teams promoted.
