= 2023–24 Primera Federación =

Primera Federación
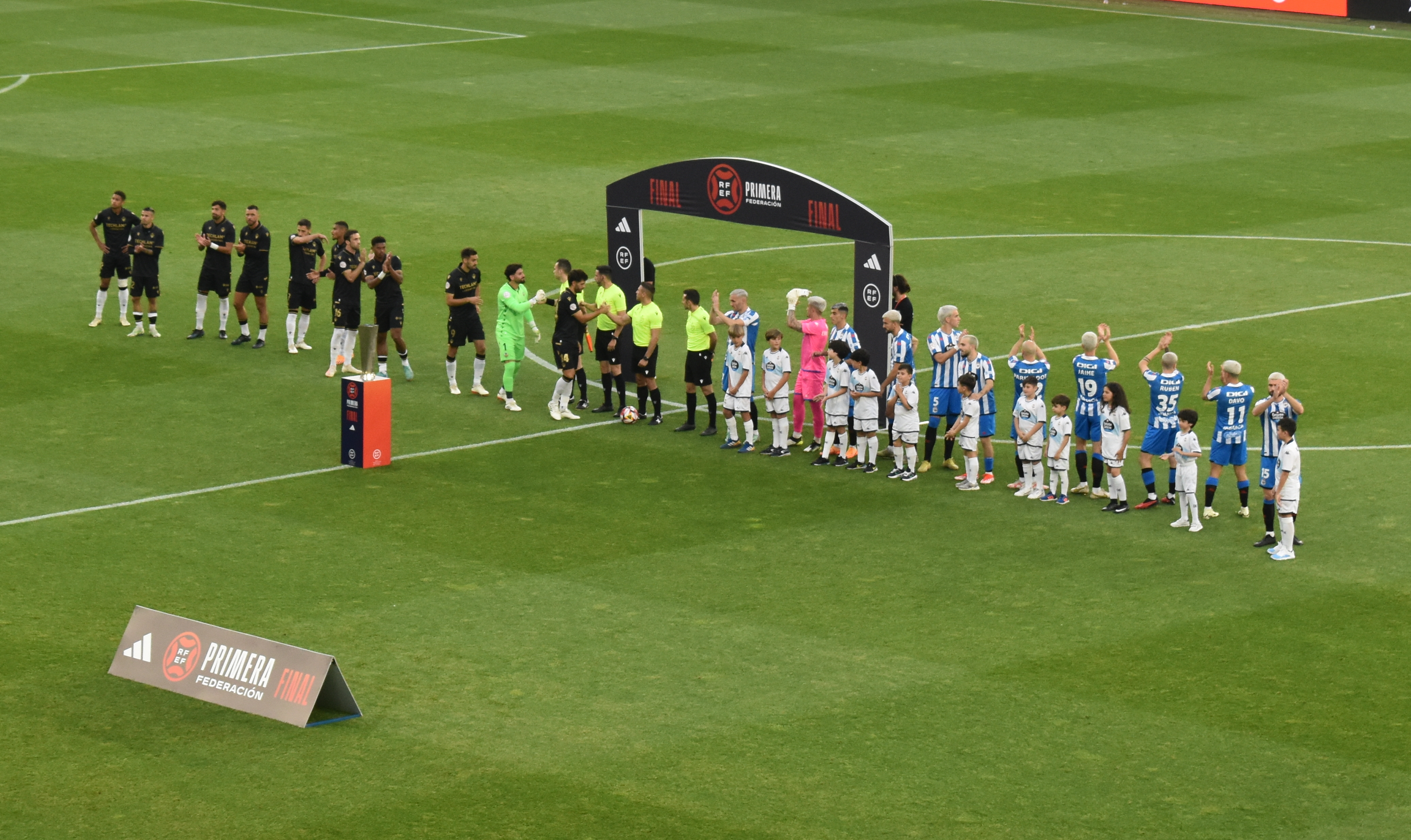
- Teams line up for the first leg of the championship final (Deportivo La Coruña 2–1 Castellón, 29 May 2024)
- Season: 2023–24
- Dates: 26 August 2023 – June 2024
- Champions: Deportivo La Coruña (1st title)
- Promoted: Castellón; Deportivo La Coruña; Málaga; Córdoba
- Relegated: Atlético Baleares; Cornellà; Linares; SD Logroñés; Melilla; Rayo Majadahonda; Recreativo Granada; Sabadell; San Fernando; Teruel
- Top goalscorer: Pau Víctor (18 goals)

The 2023–24 Primera Federación season was the third for the Primera Federación, the third-highest level in the Spanish football league system. Forty teams participated, divided into two groups of twenty clubs each based on geographical proximity. In each group, the champions were automatically promoted to Segunda División and the second to fifth placers played promotion play-offs and the bottom five were relegated to the Segunda Federación.

== Overview before the season ==
A total of 40 teams joined the league, including four relegated from the 2022–23 Segunda División, 26 retained from the 2022–23 Primera Federación, and ten promoted from the 2022–23 Segunda Federación.

=== Team changes ===
Promoted from 2022–23 Segunda Federación	Relegated from 2022–23 Segunda División	Promoted to 2023–24 Segunda División	Relegated to 2023–24 Segunda Federación
Antequera; Arenteiro; Atlético Madrid B Atlético Sanluqueño; Melilla; Recreativo Granada; Recreativo Huelva; Sestao River; Tarazona; Teruel	Ibiza; Lugo; Málaga; Ponferradina	Alcorcón; Amorebieta; Eldense; Racing Ferrol	Badajoz; Bilbao Athletic; Calahorra; La Nucía; Linense; UD Logroñés; Numancia; Pontevedra; San Sebastián de los Reyes; Talavera de la Reina

== Groups ==
=== Group 1 (North) ===
==== Teams and locations ====
Location of teams in 2023–24 Primera Federación Group 1

Team	Home city	Stadium	Capacity
Arenteiro	O Carballiño	Espiñedo	4,500
Barcelona Atlètic	Barcelona	Johan Cruyff	6,000
Celta Fortuna	Vigo	Abanca-Balaídos	24,791
Cornellà	Palamós	Estadi Palamós Costa Brava	3,724
Cultural Leonesa	León	Reino de León	13,346
Deportivo La Coruña	A Coruña	Abanca-Riazor	32,660
Fuenlabrada	Fuenlabrada	Fernando Torres	5,400
Gimnàstic	Tarragona	Nou Estadi	14,591
SD Logroñés	Logroño	Las Gaunas	16,000
Lugo	Lugo	Anxo Carro	7,070
Osasuna B	Pamplona	Tajonar	4,500
Ponferradina	Ponferrada	El Toralín	8,400
Rayo Majadahonda	Majadahonda	Cerro del Espino	3,800
Real Sociedad B	San Sebastián	José Luis Orbegozo	2,500
Real Unión	Irun	Stadium Gal	5,000
Sabadell	Sabadell	Nova Creu Alta	11,908
Sestao River	Sestao	Las Llanas	8,905
Tarazona	Tarazona	Municipal de Tarazona	5,000
Teruel	Teruel	Pinilla	4,500
Unionistas	Salamanca	Reina Sofía	5,000

==== Personnel and sponsorship ====
Team	Manager	Captain	Kit manufacturer	Shirt main sponsor
Arenteiro	(Spain) Javi Rey	(Spain) Alex Fernández	Kappa	Oreco Balgón Constructora
Barcelona Atlètic	(Mexico) Rafael Márquez	(Spain) Marc Casadó	Nike	Spotify
Celta Fortuna	(Spain) Fredi Álvarez	(Spain) Raúl Blanco	Adidas	Estrella Galicia
Cornellà	(Spain) Gonzalo Riutort	(Spain) Kike López	Patrick	Ascensores Eninter
Cultural Leonesa	(Spain) Raúl Llona	(Spain) Kevin Presa	Kappa	Aspire Academy
Deportivo La Coruña	(Spain) Imanol Idiakez	(Spain) Ian Mackay	Kappa	Estrella Galicia
Fuenlabrada	(Spain) Alfredo Sánchez	(Spain) Cristóbal Márquez	Joma	Grupo Avimosa
Gimnàstic	(Spain) Dani Vidal	(Spain) Joan Oriol	Adidas	Sorigué
SD Logroñés	(Spain) Aitor Larrazábal	(Spain) Jaime Paredes	Kappa	Embalajes Blanco
Lugo	(Spain) Roberto Trashorras	(Spain) César Morgado	Puma	Estrella Galicia
Osasuna B	(Spain) Santi Castillejo	(Spain) Xabi Huarte	Adidas	Jaylo
Ponferradina	(Spain) Juanfran	(Brazil) Yuri de Souza	Adidas	Tvitec
Rayo Majadahonda	(Spain) Jesús Arribas	(Spain) Jorge Casado	Hummel	Afar 4
Real Sociedad B	(Spain) Sergio Francisco	(Spain) Jon Magunazelaia	Macron	
Real Unión	(Spain) Fran Justo	(Spain) Txusta	Puma	BM Supermercados
Sabadell	(Spain) Óscar Cano	(Spain) Adrián Ortolá	Hummel	Laboratorio Cerba Internacional
Sestao River	(Spain) Aitor Calle	(Spain) Gorka Garai	Joma	Miramar Gunitados
Tarazona	(Spain) Molo	(Spain) Cristian Dieste	Adidas	Patatas Río Lombo
Teruel	(Spain) Raúl Jardiel	(Spain) Julen Hualde	Adidas	Fertinagro Biotech
Unionistas	(Spain) Dani Ponz	(Spain) Héctor Nespral	Erreà	Grupo Ecotisa

==== Managerial changes ====
Team	Outgoing manager	Manner of departure	Date of vacancy	Position in table	Incoming manager	Date of appointment
Deportivo La Coruña	(Spain) Rubén de la Barrera	Sacked	14 June 2023	Pre-season	(Spain) Imanol Idiakez	1 July 2023
Fuenlabrada	(Spain) Alfredo Sánchez	Demoted to assistant manager	15 June 2023	Pre-season	(Spain) Carlos Martínez	20 June 2023
Lugo	(Spain) Iñigo Vélez	Signed by Ponferradina	16 June 2023	Pre-season	(Spain) Pedro Munitis	21 June 2023
Cultural Leonesa	(Spain) Israel Martínez	Resigned	28 June 2023	Pre-season	(Spain) Raúl Llona	1 June 2023
Rayo Majadahonda	(Spain) Alfredo Santaelena	End of contract	30 June 2023	Pre-season	(Spain) Carlos Cura	12 June 2023
Ponferradina	(Spain) Juanfran	End of contract	30 June 2023	Pre-season	(Spain) Iñigo Vélez	16 June 2023
SD Logroñés	(Spain) Raúl Llona	End of contract	30 June 2023	Pre-season	(Spain) Jordi Fabregat	19 June 2023
Real Unión	(Spain) Iñaki Goikoetxea	End of contract	30 June 2023	Pre-season	(Spain) Fran Justo	19 June 2023
Tarazona	(Spain) Javi Moreno	End of contract	30 June 2023	Pre-season	(Spain) Molo	6 July 2023
Sabadell	(Spain) Miki Lladó	Sacked	9 October 2023	15th	(Spain) Gerard Bofill	10 October 2023
SD Logroñés	(Spain) Jordi Fabregat	Sacked	10 October 2023	10th	(Spain) Juanma Barroso (caretaker)	13 October 2023
SD Logroñés	(Spain) Juanma Barroso	End of caretaker spell	15 October 2023	15th	(Spain) Andrés García	15 October 2023
Sabadell	(Spain) Gerard Bofill	Sacked	19 November 2023	20th	(Spain) Óscar Cano	20 November 2023
Teruel	(Spain) Víctor Bravo	Sacked	19 November 2023	19th	(Spain) Raúl Jardiel	21 November 2023
Lugo	(Spain) Pedro Munitis	Sacked	16 December 2023	7th	(Portugal) Paulo Alves	22 December 2023
SD Logroñés	(Spain) Andrés García	Sacked	19 December 2023	14th	(Spain) Aitor Larrazábal	27 December 2023
Rayo Majadahonda	(Spain) Carlos Cura	Sacked	22 December 2023	17th	(Spain) Jon Erice	23 December 2023
Real Unión	(Spain) Fran Justo	Sacked	26 December 2023	13th	(Spain) Iñigo Idiakez	28 December 2023
Lugo	(Portugal) Paulo Alves	Sacked	19 February 2024	9th	(Spain) Roberto Trashorras	19 February 2024
Celta Fortuna	(Spain) Claudio Giráldez	Promoted to the first team	12 March 2024	5th	(Spain) Fredi Álvarez	12 March 2024
Ponferradina	(Spain) Iñigo Vélez	Sacked	18 March 2024	4th	(Spain) Juanfran	19 March 2024
Rayo Majadahonda	(Spain) Jon Erice	Sacked	25 March 2024	20th	(Spain) Armando de la Morena	26 March 2024
Real Unión	(Spain) Iñigo Idiakez	Sacked	1 April 2024	14th	(Spain) Fran Justo	4 April 2024
Fuenlabrada	(Spain) Carlos Martínez	Sacked	22 April 2024	13th	(Spain) Alfredo Sánchez	23 April 2024
Rayo Majadahonda	(Spain) Armando de la Morena	Sacked	2 May 2024	20th	(Spain) Aitor Núñez (caretaker)	2 May 2024
Rayo Majadahonda	(Spain) Aitor Núñez (caretaker)	End of caretaker spell	6 May 2024	20th	(Spain) Jesús Arribas	6 May 2024

==== League table ====
Pos	Team	Pld	W	D	L	GF	GA	GD	Pts	Qualification
1	Deportivo La Coruña (C, P)	38	22	12	4	64	27	+37	78	Promotion to Segunda División and qualification for the Copa del Rey
2	Gimnàstic	38	20	10	8	40	24	+16	70 (Note: Gimnàstic finished ahead of Barcelona Atlètic on head-to-head points: Gimnàstic 1–0 Barcelona Atlètic, Barcelona Atlètic 1–2 Gimnàstic)	Qualification for the promotion play-offs and Copa del Rey
3	Barcelona Atlètic	38	21	7	10	59	42	+17	70	Qualification for the promotion play-offs
4	Celta Fortuna	38	19	8	11	67	38	+29	65	Qualification for the promotion play-offs
5	Ponferradina	38	17	13	8	38	26	+12	64	Qualification for the promotion play-offs and Copa del Rey
6	Cultural Leonesa	38	15	15	8	35	26	+9	60	Qualification for the Copa del Rey
7	Unionistas	38	15	13	10	40	29	+11	58	Qualification for the Copa del Rey
8	Arenteiro	38	13	13	12	43	40	+3	52	
9	Real Sociedad B	38	12	15	11	43	41	+2	51	
10	Lugo	38	13	11	14	39	46	−7	50	
11	Sestao River	38	11	12	15	38	47	−9	45 (Note: Sestao River finished ahead of Osasuna B on head-to-head points: Sestao River 2–1 Osasuna B, Osasuna B 0–1 Sestao River)	
12	Osasuna B	38	11	12	15	47	53	−6	45	
13	Tarazona	38	10	14	14	29	34	−5	44 (Note: Tarazona finished ahead of Fuenlabrada on head-to-head points: Tarazona 1–0 Fuenlabrada, Fuenlabrada 0–0 Tarazona)	
14	Fuenlabrada	38	10	14	14	32	39	−7	44	
15	Real Unión	38	11	10	17	46	53	−7	43	
16	Sabadell (R)	38	11	9	18	38	57	−19	42	Relegation to Segunda Federación
17	Teruel (R)	38	6	20	12	32	41	−9	38	Relegation to Segunda Federación
18	Cornellà (R)	38	8	11	19	30	44	−14	35 (Note: Cornellà finished ahead of SD Logroñés on overall goal difference)	Relegation to Segunda Federación
19	SD Logroñés (R)	38	9	8	21	27	55	−28	35	Relegation to Segunda Federación
20	Rayo Majadahonda (Note: Sestao River awarded a 3–0 victory in their Round 30 match against Rayo Majadahonda after the latter abandoned the pitch due to racial abuse against Cheikh Kané Sarr. Rayo Majadahonda was also deducted 3 points.) (R)	38	5	15	18	28	53	−25	27	Relegation to Segunda Federación

Rules for classification: 1) points; 2) head-to-head points; 3) head-to-head goal difference; 4) goal difference; 5) number of goals scored
(Note: Head-to-head record is used only after all the matches between the teams in question have been played).
(C) Champions; (P) Promoted; (R) Relegated

==== Results ====
Home \ Away	ARE	BAR	CEL	COR	CUL	DEP	FUE	GIM	LOG	LUG	OSA	PON	RMJ	RSO	RUN	SAB	SES	TAR	TER	UNI
Arenteiro	—	2–0	1–1	1–0	1–0	1–2	1–1	0–1	3–0	1–3	1–0	0–0	2–2	1–1	2–3	2–0	1–0	1–1	1–1	4–0
Barcelona Atlètic	1–1	—	1–1	1–0	4–0	1–2	2–2	1–2	1–1	1–0	2–1	1–1	3–1	2–1	2–1	4–1	2–1	2–1	1–0	0–2
Celta Fortuna	4–3	1–2	—	1–2	2–0	1–2	4–1	0–1	4–0	4–1	4–1	0–0	3–0	1–2	3–0	4–2	4–0	1–0	3–3	2–1
Cornellà	1–2	0–2	2–1	—	1–2	0–1	1–0	0–0	0–0	1–0	0–0	0–1	2–2	0–1	3–1	0–1	1–1	1–1	1–1	3–0
Cultural Leonesa	1–0	3–1	0–0	1–0	—	1–0	1–1	3–0	1–0	2–0	0–2	0–0	2–1	3–1	2–0	3–0	0–1	1–1	0–0	1–1
Deportivo La Coruña	2–2	1–0	0–1	1–1	2–0	—	4–1	1–0	2–0	4–1	1–1	2–0	0–0	2–1	3–1	1–1	1–1	4–1	0–0	1–0
Fuenlabrada	0–0	1–2	0–2	2–0	0–1	2–1	—	2–1	2–1	0–0	4–1	2–1	0–1	1–1	0–0	1–2	3–1	0–0	0–0	0–0
Gimnàstic	1–0	1–0	1–0	3–0	3–0	1–1	1–0	—	2–1	2–0	1–1	0–0	1–0	2–2	2–1	2–0	0–0	2–1	0–2	0–1
SD Logroñés	1–0	1–0	2–3	2–2	0–0	0–5	0–0	0–2	—	2–1	1–1	0–3	0–1	0–2	1–1	1–1	3–0	2–1	0–2	0–1
Lugo	0–1	1–1	0–1	3–1	0–3	0–3	0–0	0–1	2–1	—	1–1	0–0	3–1	1–0	2–0	3–3	4–3	0–1	2–1	1–1
Osasuna B	0–0	2–3	2–3	1–0	0–0	0–4	1–2	1–0	3–0	1–2	—	0–1	1–1	1–2	2–1	2–0	0–1	1–1	1–1	1–0
Ponferradina	2–1	1–3	2–1	1–0	1–2	1–1	1–0	0–1	3–0	0–0	2–1	—	1–0	2–0	2–1	1–1	1–1	0–1	1–1	1–1
Rayo Majadahonda	2–0	1–2	1–1	1–3	1–1	0–2	0–0	1–1	1–0	1–2	2–2	0–1	—	1–1	1–1	3–1	0–2	0–0	0–0	0–0
Real Sociedad B	2–2	1–0	0–0	1–2	0–0	1–1	2–0	0–2	1–0	1–1	0–0	1–2	2–0	—	2–2	1–2	2–3	1–0	2–2	1–1
Real Unión	1–2	0–0	1–1	1–0	0–0	3–0	2–1	1–1	0–1	0–0	2–3	1–1	4–0	1–3	—	2–1	4–2	1–0	3–2	3–1
Sabadell	0–1	0–1	2–1	2–1	1–1	0–1	0–1	0–0	1–2	0–1	2–1	1–0	1–1	1–2	1–0	—	3–0	3–1	1–1	1–0
Sestao River	1–0	1–3	1–0	1–1	0–0	0–1	1–2	1–1	2–0	0–1	2–1	0–1	3–0 (Note: Sestao River awarded a 3–0 victory in their Round 30 match against Rayo Majadahonda after the latter abandoned the pitch due to racial abuse against Cheikh Kané Sarr.)	0–0	3–1	3–0	—	1–1	1–1	0–0
Tarazona	1–2	0–2	1–0	0–0	0–0	1–1	1–0	1–0	0–2	1–0	1–3	2–0	2–0	0–1	0–1	3–1	3–0	—	0–0	0–0
Teruel	0–0	2–4	0–2	1–0	0–0	1–3	0–0	0–1	0–2	1–2	2–3	0–2	1–0	0–0	2–1	2–2	1–0	0–0	—	1–2
Unionistas	4–0	4–1	0–2	3–0	1–0	1–1	2–0	2–0	1–0	1–1	1–2	0–1	2–1	1–0	1–0	4–0	0–0	0–0	0–0	—

Legend: Blue = home team win; Yellow = draw; Red = away team win.

==== Top scorers ====
As of 27 May 2024

Rank	Player	Club	Goal
1	(Spain) Pau Víctor	Barcelona Atlètic	18
2	(Spain) Alfon	Celta Fortuna	13
2	(Bulgaria) Slavy	Unionistas	13
4	(Spain) Lucas Pérez	Deportivo La Coruña	12
4	(Spain) Pablo Durán	Celta Fortuna	12

=== Group 2 (South) ===
==== Teams and locations ====
Location of teams in 2023–24 Primera Federación Group 2

Team	Home city	Stadium	Capacity
Alcoyano	Alcoy	El Collao	4,850
Algeciras	Algeciras	Nuevo Mirador	7,200
Antequera	Antequera	El Maulí	6,000
Atlético Baleares	Palma	Estadi Balear	6,000
Atlético Madrid B	Majadahonda	Cerro del Espino	3,800
Atlético Sanluqueño	Sanlúcar de Barrameda	El Palmar	5,000
Castellón	Castellón	Castalia	15,500
Ceuta	Ceuta	Alfonso Murube	6,500
Córdoba	Córdoba	El Arcángel	20,989
Ibiza	Ibiza	Can Misses	6,000
Intercity	Alicante	Antonio Solana	3,000
Linares	Linares	Linarejos	10,000
Málaga	Málaga	La Rosaleda	30,044
Melilla	Melilla	Álvarez Claro	10,000
Mérida	Mérida	Estadio Romano	14,600
Murcia	Murcia	Enrique Roca	31,179
Real Madrid Castilla	Madrid	Alfredo di Stéfano	6,000
Recreativo Granada	Granada	Ciudad Deportiva	2,500
Recreativo Huelva	Huelva	Nuevo Colombino	21,670
San Fernando	San Fernando	Iberoamericano	12,000

==== Personnel and sponsorship ====
Team	Manager	Captain	Kit manufacturer	Shirt main sponsor
Alcoyano	(Spain) Vicente Parras	(Spain) Pablo Carbonell	Kappa	
Algeciras	(Spain) Lolo Escobar	(Spain) Iván Turrillo	Nike	SCAMP
Antequera	(Spain) Javi Medina	(Argentina) Tomás Lanzini	Hummel	Grupo Casa Diego
Atlético Baleares	(Spain) Jaume Mut	(Spain) Víctor Pastrana	Joma	ConectaBalear
Atlético Madrid B	(Spain) Luis Tevenet	(Spain) Sergio Guerrero	Nike	
Atlético Sanluqueño	(Spain) Abel Segovia	(Spain) Viti	Macron	Bodega Manzanilla Solear
Castellón	(Netherlands) Dick Schreuder	(Spain) Salva Ruiz	Macron	Techlam by Levantina
Ceuta	(Spain) José Juan Romero	(Spain) Ñito González	Kappa	ceuta
Córdoba	(Spain) Iván Ania	(Spain) Kike Márquez	Givova	BioFy
Ibiza	(Spain) Onésimo Sánchez	(Spain) Alberto Escassi	Puma	Power Electronics
Intercity	(Argentina) Alejandro Sandroni	(Spain) Álvaro Pérez	Hummel	Vanadi Coffee and Lunch
Linares	(Spain) Romerito	(Spain) Rodri	Adidas	MLC Energía
Málaga	(Spain) Sergio Pellicer	(Spain) Juande	Hummel	Sabor a Málaga
Melilla	(Spain) Víctor Basadre	(Spain) José Antonio González	Macron	Melilla Ciudad del Deporte
Mérida	(Spain) David Rocha	(Spain) Manuel Bonaque	Macron	Mérida, patrimonio de la humanidad
Murcia	(Spain) Pablo Alfaro	(Spain) Pedro León	Adidas	
Real Madrid Castilla	(Spain) Raúl González	(Spain) Álvaro Carrillo	Adidas	Emirates
Recreativo Granada	(Spain) Germán Crespo	(Spain) Raúl Castro	Adidas	
Recreativo Huelva	(Spain) Abel Gómez	(Spain) Rubén Gálvez	Adidas	Eternal Energy
San Fernando	(Spain) Nano Rivas	(France) Jonathan Biabiany	Nike	Cristalvent

==== Managerial changes ====
Team	Outgoing manager	Manner of departure	Date of vacancy	Position in table	Incoming manager	Date of appointment
Castellón	(Spain) Albert Rudé	Sacked	26 June 2023	Pre-season	(Netherlands) Dick Schreuder	28 June 2023
Antequera	(Spain) Abel Segovia	End of contract	30 June 2023	Pre-season	(Spain) Javi Medina	6 June 2023
Ibiza	(Spain) Lucas Alcaraz	End of contract	30 June 2023	Pre-season	(Spain) Guillermo Fernández Romo	6 June 2023
Mérida	(Spain) Juanma Barrero	End of contract	30 June 2023	Pre-season	(Spain) Rai Rosa	7 June 2023
Córdoba	(Spain) Manuel Mosquera	End of contract	30 June 2023	Pre-season	(Spain) Iván Ania	28 June 2023
Murcia	(Spain) Mario Simón	End of contract	30 June 2023	Pre-season	(Uruguay) Gustavo Munúa	2 July 2023
San Fernando	(Spain) Pablo Alfaro	End of contract	30 June 2023	Pre-season	(Spain) Héctor Berenguel	3 July 2023
Linares	(Spain) Alberto González	End of contract	30 June 2023	Pre-season	(Spain) Óscar Fernández	4 July 2023
Algeciras	(Spain) Iván Ania	End of contract	30 June 2023	Pre-season	(Spain) Lolo Escobar	8 July 2023
Atlético Baleares	(Spain) Tato	Sacked	25 September 2023	20th	(Spain) Juanma Barrero	27 September 2023
Mérida	(Spain) Rai Rosa	Sacked	9 October 2023	15th	(Spain) David Rocha (caretaker)	9 October 2023
San Fernando	(Spain) Héctor Berenguel	Sacked	16 October 2023	15th	(Spain) Alfredo Santaelena	16 October 2023
Melilla	(Spain) Miguel Rivera	Sacked	22 October 2023	19th	(Spain) Juan Sabas	24 October 2023
Atlético Sanluqueño	(Spain) Antonio Iriondo	Sacked	30 October 2023	15th	(Spain) Abel Segovia	30 October 2023
Mérida	(Spain) David Rocha	End of caretaker spell	30 October 2023	18th	(Spain) Manuel Ruano	30 October 2023
Murcia	(Uruguay) Gustavo Munúa	Sacked	8 November 2023	8th	(Spain) Pablo Alfaro	9 November 2023
Linares	(Spain) Óscar Fernández	Sacked	22 November 2023	16th	(Spain) Pedro Bolaños (caretaker)	22 November 2023
Linares	(Spain) Pedro Bolaños	End of caretaker spell	29 November 2023	16th	(Spain) David Campaña	29 November 2023
Mérida	(Spain) Manuel Ruano	Sacked	12 December 2023	18th	(Spain) David Rocha	12 December 2023
Recreativo Granada	(Spain) Juan Antonio Milla	Sacked	7 January 2024	20th	(Spain) Germán Crespo	7 January 2024
Melilla	(Spain) Juan Sabas	Sacked	4 March 2024	19th	(Spain) Víctor Basadre	5 March 2024
Atlético Baleares	(Spain) Juanma Barrero	Sacked	12 March 2024	18th	(Spain) Jaume Mut	13 March 2024
Linares	(Spain) David Campaña	Sacked	16 April 2024	17th	(Spain) Romerito	16 April 2024
Ibiza	(Spain) Guillermo Fernández Romo	Sacked	29 April 2024	3rd	(Spain) Onésimo Sánchez	2 May 2024
San Fernando	(Spain) Alfredo Santaelena	Sacked	29 April 2024	16th	(Spain) Nano Rivas	29 April 2024

==== League table ====
Pos	Team	Pld	W	D	L	GF	GA	GD	Pts	Qualification
1	Castellón (C, P)	38	26	4	8	74	39	+35	82	Promotion to Segunda División and qualification for the Copa del Rey
2	Córdoba (O, P)	38	23	8	7	66	32	+34	77	Qualification for the promotion play-offs and Copa del Rey
3	Málaga (O, P)	38	19	13	6	51	25	+26	70	Qualification for the promotion play-offs and Copa del Rey
4	Ibiza	38	19	11	8	57	34	+23	68	Qualification for the promotion play-offs and Copa del Rey
5	Ceuta	38	17	11	10	55	40	+15	62	Qualification for the promotion play-offs and Copa del Rey
6	Recreativo Huelva	38	17	10	11	44	37	+7	61	
7	Murcia	38	16	10	12	38	38	0	58	
8	Antequera	38	16	8	14	47	47	0	56	
9	Atlético Madrid B	38	13	14	11	53	45	+8	53	
10	Real Madrid Castilla	38	13	12	13	44	43	+1	51 (Note: Real Madrid Castilla finished ahead of Alcoyano on head-to-head points: Alcoyano 0–0 Real Madrid Castilla, Real Madrid Castilla 3–1 Alcoyano)	
11	Alcoyano	38	14	9	15	38	38	0	51	
12	Mérida	38	12	11	15	37	45	−8	47	
13	Algeciras	38	11	13	14	39	43	−4	46	
14	Atlético Sanluqueño	38	11	12	15	34	41	−7	45 (Note: Atlético Sanluqueño finished ahead of Intercity on head-to-head goal difference: Intercity 1–0 Atlético Sanluqueño, Atlético Sanluqueño 3–0 Intercity)	
15	Intercity	38	12	9	17	37	49	−12	45	
16	San Fernando (R)	38	11	9	18	36	48	−12	42	Relegation to Segunda Federación
17	Linares (R)	38	10	9	19	33	51	−18	39	Relegation to Segunda Federación
18	Melilla (R)	38	9	7	22	26	52	−26	34	Relegation to Segunda Federación
19	Atlético Baleares (R)	38	7	8	23	23	59	−36	29	Relegation to Segunda Federación
20	Recreativo Granada (R)	38	7	6	25	30	56	−26	27	Relegation to Segunda Federación

Rules for classification: 1) points; 2) head-to-head points; 3) head-to-head goal difference; 4) goal difference; 5) number of goals scored
(C) Champions; (O) Play-off winners; (P) Promoted; (R) Relegated

==== Results ====
Home \ Away	ALC	ALG	ANT	ATB	ATM	ASL	CAS	CEU	COR	IBI	INT	LIN	MAL	MEL	MER	MUR	RMC	RGR	REC	SFE
Alcoyano	—	1–0	2–1	1–1	0–3	3–1	2–0	3–1	0–1	0–2	1–0	1–1	0–3	3–0	1–0	2–3	0–0	0–1	2–0	1–1
Algeciras	1–1	—	2–3	1–0	2–2	1–1	1–1	1–0	1–0	0–0	0–1	2–1	0–0	1–0	2–0	0–1	3–0	1–1	2–3	2–1
Antequera	0–0	0–1	—	3–0	1–0	2–1	1–1	0–0	2–3	3–1	1–1	2–0	0–2	3–0	2–2	0–2	1–2	5–2	1–1	2–1
Atlético Baleares	2–1	1–1	2–1	—	0–3	0–0	0–1	1–2	0–0	0–1	1–2	3–1	1–2	1–0	1–0	0–1	0–1	2–1	0–2	0–2
Atlético Madrid B	1–1	3–1	2–0	3–0	—	0–0	1–1	1–3	1–6	1–1	2–1	5–0	0–1	0–0	1–1	3–1	2–0	3–2	1–2	4–2
Atlético Sanluqueño	1–0	0–0	0–3	5–0	0–3	—	0–2	1–1	1–2	1–1	3–0	3–2	0–0	2–0	2–2	0–1	2–1	1–0	1–0	0–1
Castellón	2–0	2–1	4–1	4–2	2–0	0–1	—	2–2	2–3	1–3	3–1	4–1	2–1	1–0	5–1	2–1	4–1	3–0	3–2	1–0
Ceuta	1–0	3–2	2–0	2–1	4–0	3–0	1–3	—	1–1	0–1	2–1	4–0	3–2	0–0	1–1	1–0	2–0	1–0	0–0	0–0
Córdoba	0–1	1–0	3–0	2–0	4–1	3–0	2–0	3–3	—	2–3	1–0	0–1	1–0	4–0	2–1	0–0	1–2	3–0	1–0	1–0
Ibiza	3–0	2–2	3–0	1–0	0–1	0–0	2–0	1–2	1–1	—	1–3	4–1	1–1	4–3	0–0	3–1	0–0	1–0	5–2	3–2
Intercity	1–0	1–0	2–1	0–0	0–0	1–0	1–2	3–2	0–2	0–1	—	1–3	2–2	1–0	0–1	0–0	0–1	1–1	1–3	3–1
Linares	1–0	1–1	0–1	0–0	0–0	1–2	0–1	2–1	0–2	2–1	1–1	—	0–1	0–0	2–0	2–0	2–1	0–0	0–2	0–1
Málaga	1–2	2–1	3–0	3–0	2–1	0–0	0–1	1–1	1–1	1–0	1–0	1–1	—	1–0	1–1	0–0	0–0	3–0	2–0	1–0
Melilla	0–2	1–2	0–1	2–0	2–1	1–1	1–2	2–0	0–1	0–3	1–2	1–0	1–0	—	2–0	0–0	0–1	4–3	0–0	1–0
Mérida	1–3	3–1	0–1	2–1	0–0	0–0	2–1	3–2	2–2	1–2	3–0	1–0	1–2	2–0	—	0–1	0–1	1–0	0–0	0–2
Murcia	0–0	1–0	1–2	2–0	1–1	2–3	2–3	1–0	1–3	0–0	0–1	1–0	1–4	2–0	1–1	—	0–0	1–0	1–0	3–0
RM Castilla	3–1	1–2	0–0	5–0	2–2	1–0	0–2	1–1	0–2	1–1	3–3	0–0	1–2	2–2	0–1	5–1	—	1–0	1–2	2–1
Recreativo Granada	0–0	1–1	1–2	0–2	1–0	2–1	0–3	0–1	3–0	0–1	1–0	0–2	0–2	0–1	0–2	1–2	1–1	—	2–1	5–0
Recreativo Huelva	1–0	3–0	0–0	0–0	1–1	1–0	0–3	2–1	1–1	1–0	3–1	1–4	1–1	2–0	3–0	0–1	1–0	1–0	—	1–0
San Fernando	0–3	0–0	0–1	1–1	0–0	1–0	2–0	0–1	3–1	1–0	1–1	2–1	1–1	4–1	0–1	1–1	1–3	2–1	1–1	—

Legend: Blue = home team win; Yellow = draw; Red = away team win.

==== Top scorers ====
As of 27 May 2024

Rank	Player	Club	Goal
1	(Spain) Jesús de Miguel	Castellón	16
2	(Spain) Roberto Fernández	Málaga	15
3	(Spain) Antonio Casas	Córdoba	14
4	(Spain) Luismi Redondo	Antequera	13
5	(Equatorial Guinea) Emilio Nsue	Intercity	11

== Final ==
The winners of the two regular season groups will face off in a two-leg final to determine the overall champion.

29 May 2024
21:00 UTC+2

Deportivo La Coruña (Galicia (Spain))	2–1	(Valencian Community) Castellón
Pérez 69'; Martinez 75'		Douglas 40'

Estadio Riazor, A Coruña

2 June 2024
21:00 UTC+2

Castellón (Valencian Community)	2–4	(Galicia (Spain)) Deportivo La Coruña
Douglas 4'; Suero 53'		Pérez 26', 49'; Mella 45'; Davo 74'

Nou Estadi Castàlia, Castellón de la Plana

Deportivo La Coruña win 6–3 on aggregate and were therefore crowned 2023–24 Primera Federación champions.

== Attendances ==
Grupo 1:

#	Football club	Average attendance
1	Deportivo de La Coruña	23,380
2	Gimnàstic de Tarragona	6,898
3	SD Ponferradina	5,859
4	Cultural Leonesa	5,517
5	CE Sabadell	4,073
6	Unionistas de Salamanca	3,412
7	Celta Fortuna	2,966
8	CD Lugo	2,316
9	CD Arenteiro	1,937
10	Sestao River Club	1,909
11	FC Barcelona Atlètic	1,788
12	CD Teruel	1,509
13	Real Unión	1,347
14	CF Fuenlabrada	1,342
15	SD Tarazona	1,297
16	SD Logroñés	1,138
17	Real Sociedad	869
18	Rayo Majadahonda	840
19	CA Osasuna B	694
20	UE Cornellà	656

Grupo 2:

#	Football club	Average attendance
1	Málaga CF	21,951
2	Real Murcia	12,035
3	Córdoba CF	12,022
4	CD Castellón	11,705
5	Recreativo de Huelva	9,018
6	AD Ceuta	3,434
7	Algeciras CF	3,224
8	Linares Deportivo	2,747
9	Mérida AD	2,744
10	UD Ibiza	2,500
11	Antequera CF	2,489
12	San Fernando CD	2,484
13	CD Alcoyano	2,347
14	Atlético Sanluqueño	2,332
15	UD Melilla	1,683
16	Recreativo Granada	1,563
17	CF Intercity	1,450
18	Atlético Baleares	1,400
19	Real Madrid Castilla	1,302
20	Atlético de Madrid B	818

== See also ==
- 2023–24 La Liga
- 2023–24 Segunda División
- 2024 Primera Federación play-offs
- 2023–24 Segunda Federación
- 2023–24 Tercera Federación
