= Jesús Arribas =

Spanish football manager (born 1997)

Personal information
- Full name: Jesús Arribas Gómez
- Date of birth: 2 June 1997 (age 29)
- Place of birth: Madrid, Spain

Managerial career
- Years: Team
- 2014–2024: Rayo Majadahonda (youth)
- 2024–2025: Rayo Majadahonda
- 2025: Arenteiro

Jesús Arribas Gómez (born 2 June 1997) is a Spanish football manager.

== Career ==
Born in Madrid, Arribas wanted to be a manager, not a footballer, since the age of 13. He joined CF Rayo Majadahonda at the age of 17 in 2014, as manager of the Benjamín side, and took over the Juvenil A side on 19 July 2022, after being in charge of the Alevín, Infantil, Cadete and Juvenil C squads; in the 2021–22 season, he was also an analyst in the farm team CD Paracuellos Antamira.

On 6 May 2024, following two successful seasons in charge of the Juvenil A squad, where he qualified the side to the Copa del Rey Juvenil after a 17-year absence, Arribas became the Majariegos' fourth first team manager of the campaign, after Carlos Cura, Jon Erice and Armando de la Morena; the club was already relegated from Primera Federación. On his senior managerial debut five days later, his side lost 3–0 away to RC Celta Fortuna.

Arribas was in charge of Rayo during the entire 2024–25 campaign, and missed out promotion in the play-offs before departing the club on 10 June 2025. Seven days later, he was appointed manager of CD Arenteiro in the third division, but was sacked on 9 November 2025.

== Personal life ==
Arribas' older brother Alejandro is a footballer. A centre-back, he was groomed at Rayo Majadahonda (being now also the club's majority shareholder) before playing in La Liga for Rayo Vallecano, CA Osasuna, Sevilla FC and Deportivo de La Coruña.

== Managerial statistics ==
As of 8 November 2025

Managerial record by team and tenure
Team	Nat	From	To	Record								Ref
Team	Nat	From	To	G	W	D	L	GF	GA	GD	Win %	Ref
Rayo Majadahonda	(Spain)	6 May 2024	10 June 2025	41	16	12	13	43	41	+2	39.02	
Arenteiro	(Spain)	17 June 2025	9 November 2025	11	2	4	5	7	11	−4	18.18	
Total				52	18	16	18	50	52	−2	34.62	—
