= Romerito (footballer, born 1977) =

Spanish footballer and manager

Personal information
- Full name: Antonio Manuel Ruiz Fernández
- Date of birth: 20 February 1977 (age 49)
- Place of birth: Seville, Spain
- Height: 1.85 m (6 ft 1 in)
- Position: Defensive midfielder

Senior career*
Years	Team	Apps	(Gls)
- Cabecense
1997–1999	Xerez	59	(0)
1999–2001	Mallorca B	50	(4)
2000	Mallorca	3	(1)
2001–2002	Recreativo	7	(0)
2002	Hércules	10	(3)
2002–2003	Extremadura	24	(1)
2003–2004	Compostela	10	(0)
2004–2005	Écija	45	(3)
2005–2008	Linares	96	(11)
2008–2009	Águilas	30	(1)
2009–2010	Alavés	27	(2)
2010–2011	Lucena	33	(2)
2011–2012	Linense	31	(2)
2012–2013	Sanluqueño	29	(4)
2013–2016	Xerez Deportivo	80	(31)
Total		534	(65)

Managerial career
- 2016–2017: Xerez Deportivo (youth)
- 2017–2020: Rota
- 2020–2021: Sanluqueño
- 2021–2022: Linense
- 2023: Xerez Deportivo
- 2024: Linares
- 2025: Linense
- * Club domestic league appearances and goals

Antonio Manuel Ruiz Fernández (born 20 February 1977), commonly known as Romerito, is a Spanish retired footballer who played mainly as a defensive midfielder, and is a current manager.

== Playing career ==
Born in Seville, Andalusia, Romerito started his career with local side CD Cabecense before moving to Xerez CD in 1997. Initially assigned to the reserves, he was exclusively used in the main squad, making his professional debut on 14 September 1997 by coming on as a half-time substitute for Fernando Román in a 0–0 Segunda División away draw against CD Logroñés.

In 1999, Romerito signed for RCD Mallorca, and was assigned to the B-team in Segunda División B. He made his first team – and La Liga – debut on 17 January 2000, starting and scoring the opener in a 1–2 loss at Real Madrid.

In 2001, Romerito agreed to a deal with Recreativo de Huelva in the second division, but left for Hércules CF in the following January after being rarely used. He would resume his career mainly in the third level in the following years, representing CF Extremadura, SD Compostela, Écija Balompié, Linares CF, Águilas CF, Deportivo Alavés, Lucena CF, Real Balompédica Linense and Atlético Sanluqueño CF.

In August 2013, Romerito joined Xerez Deportivo FC, and helped the club in three consecutive promotions to Primera Andaluza before retiring in June 2016, aged 39.

== Coaching career ==
Immediately after retiring, Romerito started working as a youth manager at his last club Xerez Deportivo. On 4 November 2017, he was named manager of CD Rota in the fifth division, and achieved promotion to Tercera División with the club in 2019.

On 10 March 2020, Romerito left Rota to take over third division side Atlético Sanluqueño, and helped the side to avoid relegation. The following 7 April, however, he was sacked.

On 20 May 2021, Romerito was appointed at the helm of another club he represented as a player, Linense. Sacked on 19 February 2022, he spent nearly a year unemployed before returning to Xerez Deportivo, now as first team manager; he left the latter on 19 May 2023.

On 16 April 2024, Romerito became Linares Deportivo's third manager of the campaign, after Óscar Fernández and David Campaña.

On 18 March 2025, Romerito returned to Linense for a second spell in charge; with which he became their third manager of the campaign, after Miguel Rivera and Javi Moreno.

== Managerial statistics ==
As of match played 4 May 2025

Managerial record by team and tenure
Team	Nat	From	To	Record								Ref
Team	Nat	From	To	G	W	D	L	GF	GA	GD	Win %	Ref
Rota	(Spain)	4 November 2017	10 March 2020	88	44	18	26	152	125	+27	50.00	
Sanluqueño	(Spain)	10 March 2020	7 April 2021	19	9	4	6	18	18	+0	47.37	
Linense	(Spain)	20 May 2021	19 February 2022	25	8	8	9	20	27	−7	32.00	
Xerez Deportivo	(Spain)	6 February 2023	19 May 2023	14	5	4	5	14	15	−1	35.71	
Linares	(Spain)	16 April 2024	17 June 2024	6	2	1	3	7	7	+0	33.33	
Linense	(Spain)	18 March 2025	5 June 2025	7	2	1	4	4	6	−2	28.57	
Total				159	70	36	53	215	198	+17	44.03	—
