= Romerito (disambiguation) =

Romerito (born 1960) is a Paraguayan football midfielder.

Romerito may also refer to:

- Romerito (footballer, born 1975), Brazilian football striker
- Romerito (footballer, born 1977), Spanish football defensive midfielder and manager

== See also ==
- Romeritos, Mexican dish of tender sprigs of seepweed
