= Jeremy Jorge =

Spanish footballer (born 2003)

Personal information
- Full name: Jeremy José Jorge Jiménez
- Date of birth: 9 February 2003 (age 23)
- Place of birth: Las Palmas, Spain
- Height: 1.65 m (5 ft 5 in)
- Position: Winger

Team information
- Current team: Rayo Majadahonda (on loan from Tenerife)

Youth career
- 2013–2018: Las Palmas
- 2018–2022: Real Madrid
- 2020–2021: → Castellón (loan)
- 2021–2022: → Albacete (loan)

Senior career*
Years	Team	Apps	(Gls)
2021–2024	Real Madrid B	0	(0)
2021–2022	→ Albacete B (loan)	10	(1)
2022–2023	RSC Internacional	28	(1)
2023–2024	→ Sanluqueño (loan)	7	(0)
2024–2025	Getafe B	35	(4)
2024	Getafe	1	(0)
2025–	Tenerife	7	(0)
2026–	→ Rayo Majadahonda (loan)	0	(0)
- * Club domestic league appearances and goals as of 9 June 2026

Jeremy José Jorge Jiménez (born 9 February 2003), sometimes known as just Jeremy, is a Spanish professional footballer who plays mainly as a left winger for CF Rayo Majadahonda, on loan from CD Tenerife.

== Career ==
Born in Las Palmas, Canary Islands, Jeremy joined Real Madrid's La Fábrica in May 2018, from hometown side UD Las Palmas. On 8 October 2020, however, he was loaned to the Juvenil A squad of CD Castellón.

In July 2021, Jeremy moved to Albacete Balompié also in a temporary deal; initially a member of the Juvenil squad, he made his senior debut with the reserves on 4 December, coming on as a second-half substitute in a 1–1 Tercera División RFEF away draw against CD Manchego Ciudad Real. He scored his first senior goal on 1 May 2022, netting the B's fourth in a 4–1 away routing of Villarrubia CF.

Upon returning to Los Blancos in July 2022, Jeremy was assigned to fellow fifth tier RSC Internacional FC as the club was acting as Real Madrid's C-team. On 19 July 2023, he was loaned to Primera Federación side Atlético Sanluqueño CF for the season.

Jeremy left Sanluqueño on 1 February 2024, and subsequently joined Getafe CF, being initially assigned to the B-team in Segunda Federación. He made his first team – and La Liga – debut on 3 May, replacing Jaime Mata late into a 2–0 home loss to Athletic Bilbao.

On 1 July 2025, Jeremy signed a two-year deal with CD Tenerife in the third division. On 14 July of the following year, after being rarely used as the club returned to the second level, he was loaned to CF Rayo Majadahonda for one year.
