= Alberto González (football manager) =

Spanish football manager (born 1979)

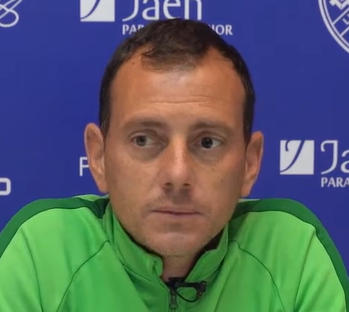
- González in 2021

Personal information
- Full name: Alberto González Fernández
- Date of birth: 7 June 1979 (age 47)
- Place of birth: Tolox, Spain

Managerial career
- Years: Team
- 2000–2001: Athletic Coín (youth)
- 2001–2002: Málaga (youth)
- 2002–2003: Atlético Yunquera
- 2003–2005: Veteranos Granada (youth)
- 2005–2008: Granada Atlético (youth)
- 2008–2009: Granada Atlético
- 2009–2010: Arenas Armilla
- 2010–2012: Málaga (youth)
- 2014–2015: Loja
- 2015–2018: El Ejido
- 2019–2020: Jaén
- 2020: San Fernando
- 2020–2021: Linares
- 2021–2023: Linares
- 2023–2024: Betis B
- 2024–2026: Albacete

Alberto González Fernández (born 7 June 1979) is a Spanish football manager. He was most recently in charge of Albacete Balompié.

== Career ==
=== Early career ===
González was born in Tolox, Málaga, Andalusia, and began his career with the Cadete squad of CD Athletic de Coín in 2000. In the following year, he took over Málaga CF's Alevín squad, before moving to his first senior role with Atlético Yunquera in 2002, with the club in the Segunda Provincial.

In 2003, González returned to youth football after being named manager of Asociación Veteranos Granada CF's Cadete team. In 2005, he was appointed in charge of the Juvenil squad of Granada Atlético CF, before becoming first team manager on 20 June 2008.

González left Granada in August 2009 after the club folded, and was named manager of fellow Tercera División side Arenas CD shortly after. In July 2010, he returned to Málaga after being named in charge of the Juvenil squad, and reached the 2012 Copa del Rey Juvenil final with the side.

On 9 May 2013, after working as a director of the youth setup with the Albicelestes, González moved to Real Betis as an assistant coordinator of the youth sides. He returned to managerial duties on 5 June 2014, after being named at the helm of Loja CD in the fourth division.

González was sacked by Loja on 16 February 2015, and took over CD El Ejido also in division four on 14 June. He led the latter to a first-ever promotion to Segunda División B in his first season, and kept the side in the division until being dismissed on 29 December 2018.

On 5 July 2019, González replaced Germán Crespo at the helm of fourth level side Real Jaén. He left to take over San Fernando CD in the third division the following 28 January, but was relieved from his duties at the latter on 2 July 2020.

=== Linares ===
On 15 August 2020, González was appointed manager of Linares Deportivo also in division three. After being group champions in the regular season, his side missed out promotion in the play-offs, and he opted to leave on 2 June 2021.

González returned to Linares on 24 September 2021, in the place of Alejandro Sandroni. On 8 June 2023, after finishing twice in the top six teams of the group, he again left the club.

=== Betis ===
On 9 June 2023, González returned to Betis after being named manager of the reserves in Segunda Federación.

=== Albacete ===
On 27 March 2024, González left Betis to take over Segunda División side Albacete Balompié on a contract until June 2025. He had his first professional match in charge three days later, a 1–1 home draw against SD Huesca.

On 27 March 2025, González renewed his link with Alba until 2026, and agreed to another one-year extension on 27 May of that year. He led the side to a 3–2 win over Álvaro Arbeloa's Real Madrid in the round of 16 of the 2025–26 Copa del Rey, but suffered a narrow 2–1 loss to FC Barcelona in the following round of the competition.

González was sacked on 3 October 2026, after a winless start to the 2026–27 campaign.

== Managerial statistics ==
As of match played 3 October 2026

Managerial record by team and tenure
Team	Nat	From	To	Record								Ref
Team	Nat	From	To	G	W	D	L	GF	GA	GD	Win %	Ref
Granada Atlético	(Spain)	20 June 2008	8 August 2009	38	14	7	17	44	52	−8	36.84	
Arenas Armilla	(Spain)	23 August 2009	15 May 2010	36	9	8	19	33	63	−30	25.00	
Loja	(Spain)	5 June 2014	16 February 2015	26	14	6	6	40	26	+14	53.85	
El Ejido	(Spain)	14 June 2015	29 December 2018	138	59	31	48	197	163	+34	42.75	
Jaén	(Spain)	5 July 2019	28 January 2020	24	13	5	6	47	23	+24	54.17	
San Fernando	(Spain)	28 January 2020	2 July 2020	6	3	2	1	13	6	+7	50.00	
Linares	(Spain)	15 August 2020	2 June 2021	27	15	5	7	32	21	+11	55.56	
Linares	(Spain)	24 September 2021	8 June 2023	79	37	16	26	114	107	+7	46.84	
Betis B	(Spain)	9 June 2023	27 March 2024	28	11	11	6	35	23	+12	39.29	
Albacete	(Spain)	27 March 2024	3 October 2026	108	39	30	39	143	145	−2	36.11	
Career total				510	214	121	175	698	629	+69	41.96	—
