= Jon Erice =

Spanish footballer (born 1986)

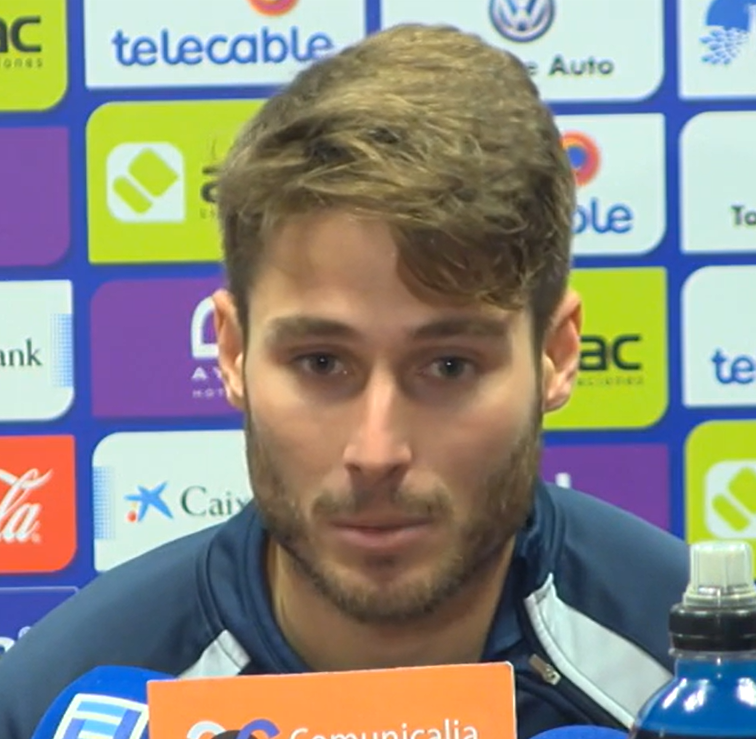
- Erice in 2015

Personal information
- Full name: Ion Erice Domínguez
- Date of birth: 3 November 1986 (age 40)
- Place of birth: Pamplona, Spain
- Height: 1.77 m (5 ft 10 in)
- Position: Midfielder

Team information
- Current team: Arenas Getxo (manager)

Youth career
- Osasuna

Senior career*
Years	Team	Apps	(Gls)
2005–2008	Osasuna B	59	(1)
2007–2009	Osasuna	9	(0)
2008	→ Málaga (loan)	5	(0)
2008–2009	→ Huesca (loan)	10	(0)
2009–2010	Cádiz	43	(0)
2010–2012	Apollon Limassol	35	(1)
2012	Kerkyra	9	(0)
2012–2013	Guadalajara	36	(0)
2013–2017	Oviedo	130	(4)
2017–2019	Albacete	55	(1)
2019	Vancouver Whitecaps	21	(0)
2020	Albacete	15	(0)
2020–2021	Hércules	9	(0)
2021–2022	Mutilvera	25	(1)
Total		461	(8)

Managerial career
- 2022–2023: Mutilvera
- 2023: Manchego Ciudad Real
- 2023–2024: Rayo Majadahonda
- 2024–2025: Granada B
- 2025–: Arenas Getxo
- * Club domestic league appearances and goals

Ion "Jon" Erice Domínguez (born 3 November 1986) is a Spanish former professional footballer who played as a midfielder. He is the manager of Primera Federación club Arenas de Getxo.

== Playing career ==
Erice was born in Pamplona, Navarre. A CA Osasuna youth graduate, he appeared in a total of nine first-team games in his first two seasons, the first coming on 1 April 2007 in a 0–0 La Liga home draw against Sevilla FC (90 minutes played). He finished the following campaign on loan to Segunda División's Málaga CF, contributing five matches to the Andalusia side's top-flight return.

In 2008–09 Erice was loaned again, now to SD Huesca, newly promoted to the second division. He was released in January 2009, signing a one-and-a-half-year contract with Segunda División B club Cádiz CF although a loan was initially projected, making ten appearances for another promotion.

Erice was an undisputed starter throughout the 2009–10 season – 36 games, 2,696 minutes – but Cádiz were immediately relegated after finishing 19th. He returned to the second tier with Real Oviedo in 2015, terminating his contract after four years at the Estadio Carlos Tartiere, two of them as team captain; one month before, he faced a supporter in one of the most populous streets in Oviedo.

On 2 August 2017, Erice signed a two-year deal with fellow second-division side Albacete Balompié. The 32-year-old moved to the Major League Soccer with the Vancouver Whitecaps FC on 22 January 2019, parting by mutual consent one year later before the start of the new season and immediately returning to his previous employers on a six-month deal.

Erice subsequently represented Hércules CF in the third level and UD Mutilvera in the Segunda Federación.

== Coaching career ==
On 9 November 2022, Erice retired and immediately became manager of his last club. He avoided relegation in his only season, then took over fellow fourth-tier CD Manchego Ciudad Real on 30 June 2023.

Erice replaced the sacked Carlos Cura at the helm of Primera Federación team CF Rayo Majadahonda on 23 December 2023. He was himself dismissed the following March, with the side in last position of their group.

On 28 June 2024, Erice was appointed at Club Recreativo Granada, recently relegated to division four. On 5 February 2025, he was fired.

On 13 June 2025, Erice became head coach of Arenas Club de Getxo in place of Ibai Gómez.

== Managerial statistics ==
As of match played 23 May 2026

Managerial record by team and tenure
Team	Nat	From	To	Record								Ref
Team	Nat	From	To	G	W	D	L	GF	GA	GD	Win %	Ref
Mutilvera	(Spain)	9 November 2022	30 June 2023	24	11	4	9	37	24	+13	45.83	
Manchego Ciudad Real	(Spain)	30 June 2023	23 December 2023	19	6	5	8	16	25	−9	31.58	
Rayo Majadahonda	(Spain)	23 December 2023	25 March 2024	12	1	6	5	10	17	−7	8.33	
Granada B	(Spain)	28 June 2024	5 February 2025	21	5	3	13	21	32	−11	23.81	
Arenas Getxo	(Spain)	13 June 2025	Present	39	15	7	17	46	58	−12	38.46	
Career total				115	38	25	52	130	156	−26	33.04	—

== Honours ==
Cádiz

- Segunda División B: 2008–09

Oviedo

- Segunda División B: 2014–15
