= Alfredo Sánchez (Spanish footballer) =

Spanish footballer and coach

Personal information
- Full name: Alfredo Sánchez Benito
- Date of birth: 3 December 1972 (age 53)
- Place of birth: Madrid, Spain
- Height: 1.64 m (5 ft 5 in)
- Position: Midfielder

Youth career
- 1984–1989: La Paz

Senior career*
| Years | Team | Apps | (Gls) |
| 1989–1992 | San Nicasio | | |
| 1992–1994 | Leganés B | | |
| 1994–1998 | Leganés | 134 | (7) |
| 1998–2004 | Osasuna | 169 | (15) |
| 2004–2007 | Elche | 103 | (7) |
| 2007–2008 | Benidorm | 32 | (2) |
| Total | | 438 | (31) |

Managerial career
- 2008–2014: Osasuna (assistant)
- 2015–2016: Osasuna (assistant)
- 2017–2018: Albacete (assistant)
- 2018–2019: Gimnàstic (assistant)
- 2019: Córdoba (assistant)
- 2022–2023: Fuenlabrada (assistant)
- 2023: Fuenlabrada
- 2024: Fuenlabrada
- * Club domestic league appearances and goals

Alfredo Sánchez Benito (born 3 December 1972), known simply as Alfredo as a player, is a Spanish former professional footballer who played as a midfielder, currently a manager.

Over ten seasons, he amassed Segunda División totals of 314 matches and 24 goals, with Leganés, Osasuna (which he also represented in La Liga) and Elche.

After retiring, Alfredo worked several years as assistant coach with Osasuna.

== Playing career ==
Alfredo was born in Madrid. Starting in 1993–94, he played his first seven seasons as a professional in the Segunda División, with hometown club CD Leganés and CA Osasuna. In the last one, he appeared in 37 games and scored four goals to help the latter side to return to La Liga after an absence of six years.

Subsequently, Alfredo competed with the Navarrese in the top division, his best year being 2002–03 – 31 matches, 21 starts, 1,910 minutes of action. Released in the summer of 2004, he then was first-choice for three second-tier campaigns with Elche CF, and he retired at the end of 2007–08 (aged 35) in the Segunda División B, where he represented Benidorm CF.

== Post-retirement ==
Sánchez re-joined Osasuna immediately after retiring, going on to act as assistant coach for several managers. In between those spells, he worked as match scout at Atlético Madrid.

Following a three-year spell as scout of CF Fuenlabrada, Sánchez became Mere's assistant in July 2022. On 15 February 2023, the former became interim manager after the latter was dismissed, and 13 days later he was confirmed in the position until the end of the season in the Primera Federación.

On 15 June 2023, having avoided relegation, Sánchez opted not to continue at the helm of the first team, but remained in the club's sporting structure. On 23 April 2024, he was again appointed until the end of the campaign, replacing the sacked Carlos Martínez.

Sánchez started 2024–25 still in charge. He was relieved of his duties on 21 October 2024, after only one win in nine matches.

== Managerial statistics ==
As of 18 November 2024

Managerial record by team and tenure
| Team | Nat | From | To | Record | | | | | | | | Ref |
| Team | Nat | From | To | G | W | D | L | GF | GA | GD | Win % | Ref |
|---|---|---|---|---|---|---|---|---|---|---|---|---|
| Fuenlabrada | (Spain) | 15 February 2023 | 15 June 2023 | 15 | 7 | 2 | 6 | 15 | 19 | −4 | 46.67 | |
| Fuenlabrada | (Spain) | 23 April 2024 | 21 October 2024 | 14 | 2 | 7 | 5 | 7 | 10 | −3 | 14.29 | |
| Total | | | | 29 | 9 | 9 | 11 | 22 | 29 | −7 | 31.03 | — |
