= David Campaña =

Spanish football manager (born 1974)

Personal information
- Full name: David Campaña Piquer
- Date of birth: 23 May 1974 (age 52)
- Place of birth: Marbella, Spain

Managerial career
- Years: Team
- 2008–2010: Marbella (assistant)
- 2012–2013: Atlético Marbella
- 2013–2014: Tesorillo
- 2014–2015: Marbella (youth)
- 2017: Utenis Utena
- 2018: Alcalá
- 2019–2020: Lori
- 2020–2021: Ararat-Armenia
- 2021–2022: Atlético Porcuna
- 2022–2023: El Palo
- 2023: Sevilla C
- 2023–2024: Linares
- 2024: International Allies
- 2024–2025: Lincoln Red Imps
- 2025–2026: Torre del Mar

David Campaña Piquer (born 23 May 1974) is a Spanish football manager.

== Career ==
Born in Marbella, Málaga, Andalusia, Campaña was a futsal player who notably represented Benalmádena FS. After retiring, he worked as an assistant of José Luis Montes at Marbella FC before being appointed manager of UD Tesorillo on 31 October 2013, after a brief period at CD Atlético Marbella. He was sacked by the club on 25 February 2014.

On 15 May 2017, after two years working in China, Campaña moved abroad and was appointed manager of Lithuanian club FK Utenis Utena. In November, after avoiding relegation, he left.

On 23 July 2018, Campaña returned to Spain after being named in charge of CD Alcalá in the División de Honor. He resigned on 29 December, and switched teams and countries again after being appointed manager of Lori FC in the Armenian Premier League the following 19 June.

Campaña left Lori on 2 June 2020, due to the effects of the COVID-19 pandemic, but moved to fellow league team FC Ararat-Armenia on 22 July. He left the latter by mutual consent on 5 March 2021.

On 26 June 2021, Campaña took over Tercera División RFEF side Atlético Porcuna CF. He left the club the following 26 April, after achieving the club's best-ever campaign in a national competition, and signed for fellow league team El Palo FC on 19 May 2022.

On 27 June 2023, after leading El Palo to a promotion to Segunda Federación, Campaña took over Sevilla FC C in the fifth tier. On 29 November, he replaced Óscar Fernández at the helm of Linares Deportivo in Primera Federación until the end of the season.

On 16 April 2024, Campaña was sacked from Linares, after only five wins in 19 matches in charge. After a spell in Ghana with International Allies, he was appointed head coach of Lincoln Red Imps in September 2024, on an initial one year contract.

== Managerial statistics ==
As of 22 February 2025

Managerial record by team and tenure
Team	Nat	From	To	Record								Ref
Team	Nat	From	To	G	W	D	L	GF	GA	GD	Win %	Ref
Atlético Marbella	(Spain)	1 July 2012	20 June 2013	38	16	10	12	64	50	+14	42.11	
Tesorillo	(Spain)	31 October 2013	25 February 2014	14	2	4	8	12	31	−19	14.29	
Utenis Utena	(Lithuania)	15 May 2017	22 November 2017	23	4	7	12	21	41	−20	17.39	
Alcalá	(Spain)	23 July 2018	29 December 2018	16	8	4	4	22	11	+11	50.00	
Lori	(Armenia)	18 June 2019	2 June 2020	21	10	6	5	32	22	+10	47.62	
Ararat-Armenia	(Armenia)	22 July 2020	5 March 2021	17	8	3	6	23	14	+9	47.06	
Atlético Porcuna	(Spain)	26 June 2021	26 April 2022	32	11	9	12	42	47	−5	34.38	
El Palo	(Spain)	19 May 2022	27 June 2023	36	23	8	5	50	22	+28	63.89	
Sevilla C	(Spain)	27 June 2023	29 November 2023	12	3	3	6	10	15	−5	25.00	
Linares	(Spain)	29 November 2023	16 April 2024	19	5	4	10	16	29	−13	26.32	
Lincoln Red Imps	(Gibraltar)	13 September 2024	28 February 2025	19	15	3	1	54	6	+48	78.95	
Career total				247	105	61	81	346	288	+58	42.51	—
