= Raúl Jardiel =

Spanish football manager (born 1982)

Personal information
- Full name: Raúl Jardiel Dobato
- Date of birth: 29 April 1982 (age 44)
- Place of birth: Zaragoza, Spain

Managerial career
- Years: Team
- 2009–2014: Zaragoza (youth)
- 2014–2017: Zaragoza B (assistant)
- 2017: Zaragoza (assistant)
- 2017–2018: Zaragoza B (assistant)
- 2019: Conquense (assistant)
- 2019–2021: Brea
- 2021–2022: Ebro
- 2023–2024: Teruel
- 2024–2025: Arenteiro
- 2025–2026: Espanyol B
- 2026: Huesca

Raúl Jardiel Dobato (born 29 April 1982) is a Spanish football manager.

== Career ==
Born in Zaragoza, Aragon, Jardiel began his career with the youth sides of hometown club Real Zaragoza. On 22 October 2014, he became an assistant of César Láinez in the reserves, and moved to the first team in March 2017 when Láinez was named manager.

In June 2017, both Jardiel and Láinez returned to the reserves, and followed the latter to UB Conquense in January 2019, also as his assistant. On 27 May of that year, he was appointed manager of Tercera División side CD Brea.

Jardiel led Brea to a first-ever promotion to Segunda División RFEF, but left the club on 25 May 2021. Three days later, he took over fellow fourth tier side CD Ebro.

On 29 November 2022, Jardiel left Ebro on a mutual agreement, after a poor start of the campaign. He spent nearly a year without a club before being named at the helm of Primera Federación side CD Teruel on 21 November 2023.

On 7 June 2024, after suffering relegation, Jardiel left Teruel, and took over CD Arenteiro also in the third division on 25 June. He departed the latter on 5 June 2025, and was named in charge of RCD Espanyol's B-team in the fourth division six days later.

On 3 June 2026, Jardiel was appointed at the helm of SD Huesca, freshly relegated to division three. He was dismissed on 11 October, after only seven matches.

== Managerial statistics ==
As of 12 October 2026

Managerial record by team and tenure
Team	Nat	From	To	Record								Ref
Team	Nat	From	To	G	W	D	L	GF	GA	GD	Win %	Ref
Brea	(Spain)	27 May 2019	25 May 2021	59	33	13	13	82	41	+41	55.93	
Ebro	(Spain)	28 May 2021	29 November 2022	51	13	21	17	43	47	−4	25.49	
Teruel	(Spain)	21 November 2023	7 June 2024	25	6	13	6	28	29	−1	24.00	
Arenteiro	(Spain)	25 June 2024	5 June 2025	38	12	12	14	40	42	−2	31.58	
Espanyol B	(Spain)	11 June 2025	28 May 2026	34	10	14	10	34	35	−1	29.41	
Huesca	(Spain)	3 June 2026	11 October 2026	7	2	4	1	9	9	+0	28.57	
Career total				214	76	77	61	236	203	+33	35.51	—
