= Juan Antonio Milla =

Spanish footballer and manager

Personal information
- Full name: Juan Antonio Milla Escabias
- Date of birth: 5 April 1983 (age 43)
- Place of birth: Albolote, Spain
- Height: 1.81 m (5 ft 11 in)
- Position: Left back

Youth career
- Imperio Albolote
- 2001–2002: Espanyol

Senior career*
Years	Team	Apps	(Gls)
2002–2003	Prat		
2003–2004	Valencia C		
2004	→ Imperio Albolote (loan)		
2004–2005	Murcia B		
2005–2008	Granada	97	(1)
2008–2009	Granada 74	33	(2)
2009	Alcalá	0	(0)
2009–2010	Logroñés	28	(0)
2010–2016	Maracena		

Managerial career
- 2013–2018: Maracena (youth)
- 2018–2019: Maracena
- 2019–2022: Granada (youth)
- 2022–2024: Granada B
- 2024: Linares
- * Club domestic league appearances and goals

Juan Antonio Milla Escabias (born 5 April 1983) is a Spanish retired footballer who played as a left back, and is a current manager.

== Playing career ==
Milla was born in Albolote, Granada, Andalusia, and joined RCD Espanyol's youth setup in 2001 from hometown side CD Imperio de Albolote. In 2002, after finishing his formation, he moved to Tercera División side AE Prat.

In January 2004, after a brief period with Valencia CF's C-team also in the fourth division, Milla returned to Imperio on loan. He later represented Real Murcia's B-team before joining Granada CF in 2005 and helping in their promotion to Segunda División B in his first season.

On 3 July 2008, Milla agreed to a deal with neighbouring Granada 74 CF also in division three. On 13 May of the following year, he moved to RSD Alcalá for the fourth division promotion play-offs, and achieved promotion with the club.

On 20 July 2009, Milla signed a one-year contract with UD Logroñés. He moved to UD Maracena in September 2010, and continued to feature regularly with the latter until his retirement in 2016, aged 33.

== Managerial career ==
Milla started his managerial career in 2013 while still playing for Maracena, being manager of the club's Cadete and later Juvenil squads. On 29 May 2018, he was named at the helm of the first team in the División de Honor.

On 4 July 2019, Milla returned to Granada to take over the club's Cadete A squad. He was appointed manager of the Juvenil A side on 18 February 2021, and took over the reserves in Segunda División RFEF on 23 March 2022.

On 5 July 2023, after leading the B-team to a promotion to Primera Federación, Milla renewed his contract with the Nazaríes. The following 7 January, however, he was sacked with the club in the last position.

On 28 June 2024, Milla was named manager of Linares in Segunda Federación. However on 21 December 2024; following a 2–0 loss against Xerez earlier the same day, he was sacked with the club in 13th place.

== Managerial statistics ==
As of 21 December 2024

Managerial record by team and tenure
Team	Nat	From	To	Record								Ref
Team	Nat	From	To	G	W	D	L	GF	GA	GD	Win %	Ref
Maracena	(Spain)	29 May 2018	28 May 2019	34	19	12	3	58	33	+25	55.88	
Recreativo Granada	(Spain)	23 March 2022	7 January 2024	64	25	15	24	77	76	+1	39.06	
Linares	(Spain)	28 June 2024	21 December 2024	17	6	3	8	15	19	−4	35.29	
Career total				115	50	30	35	150	128	+22	43.48	—
