= Alejandro Arribas =

Spanish footballer (born 1989)

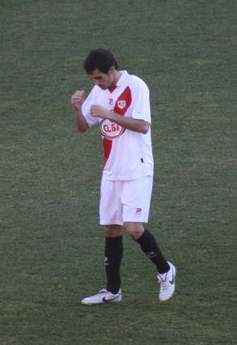
- Arribas with Rayo Vallecano in 2011

Personal information
- Full name: Alejandro Arribas Garrido
- Date of birth: 1 May 1989 (age 37)
- Place of birth: Madrid, Spain
- Height: 1.82 m (6 ft 0 in)
- Position: Centre-back

Youth career
- Rayo Majadahonda

Senior career*
Years	Team	Apps	(Gls)
2007–2008	Rayo Majadahonda		
2008–2010	Rayo Vallecano B	47	(0)
2009	→ Navalcarnero (loan)	15	(1)
2010–2012	Rayo Vallecano	74	(2)
2012–2014	Osasuna	70	(3)
2014–2015	Sevilla	11	(0)
2015–2017	Deportivo La Coruña	57	(2)
2018–2019	UNAM	41	(1)
2019–2021	Oviedo	65	(2)
2022–2023	Juárez	42	(1)
2023–2024	Kalamata	17	(0)
2024–2025	Rayo Majadahonda	7	(0)
Total		446	(12)
- * Club domestic league appearances and goals

Alejandro Arribas Garrido (born 1 May 1989) is a Spanish former professional footballer who played as a centre-back.

He made 172 appearances in La Liga for Rayo Vallecano, Osasuna, Sevilla and Deportivo, winning the Europa League with the third of those teams. Additionally, he played for UNAM and Juárez in Mexico's Liga MX.

== Club career ==
=== Rayo Vallecano ===
Born in Madrid, Arribas began his career in the youth ranks of CF Rayo Majadahonda, being signed by neighbouring Rayo Vallecano in 2008. He spent almost two full seasons with the reserves, making his professional debut with CDA Navalcarnero in the second half of 2008–09 and going on to be regularly used in a relegation-ending campaign in the Segunda División B.

Arribas helped Rayo B to promote to the third tier in 2009–10, moving to the first team shortly after – in the Segunda División – and being first choice (38 games out of 42) as the latter returned to La Liga after eight years. In the 2011–12 season he started in all of his 34 league appearances as the capital outskirts side narrowly avoided relegation, scoring in a 2–3 home loss against Athletic Bilbao on 28 January 2012.

=== Osasuna ===
In late June 2012, free agent Arribas signed a three-year contract with CA Osasuna. He was a regular for the Navarrese, appearing in 34 matches in his debut campaign.

=== Sevilla ===
On 27 July 2014, following Osasuna's relegation, Arribas agreed to a two-year deal with fellow top-flight club Sevilla FC. He played 18 games in all competitions in his only season, including three in the UEFA Europa League group stage as his team won the competition for the second time in a row.

=== Deportivo ===
Arribas signed a four-year contract at Deportivo de La Coruña on 24 June 2015. His first league match for them took place on 30 August, when he featured the full 90 minutes in a 1–1 draw at Valencia CF, and he scored twice in his first year to help to a 15th-place finish.

=== UNAM ===
On 8 December 2017, after only three league appearances during the first part of the season as well as some run-ins with teammates, the 28-year-old Arribas moved abroad for the first time in his career and joined Club Universidad Nacional in the Mexican Liga MX.

He scored his only league goal on 4 February 2018, helping the hosts beat Tigres UANL 2–0.

=== Oviedo ===
On 30 July 2019, Arribas returned to Spain after agreeing to a three-year deal with Real Oviedo of the second division.

== Personal life ==
Arribas' younger brother Jesús is a football manager, and worked solely at Rayo Majadahonda. In September 2019, while still an active professional, he became the majority shareholder of the club's Sociedad Anónima Deportiva.

== Career statistics ==
As of 20 May 2017

Club	Season	League			Cup		Other		Total	
Club	Season	Division	Apps	Goals	Apps	Goals	Apps	Goals	Apps	Goals
Navalcarnero (loan)	2008–09	Segunda División B	15	1	—		—		15	1
Rayo Vallecano	2009–10	Segunda División	2	1	1	0	—		3	1
Rayo Vallecano	2010–11	Segunda División	38	0	0	0	—		38	0
Rayo Vallecano	2011–12	La Liga	34	1	2	0	—		36	1
Rayo Vallecano	Total		74	2	3	0	—		77	2
Osasuna	2012–13	La Liga	34	2	1	0	—		35	2
Osasuna	2013–14	La Liga	36	1	2	0	—		38	0
Osasuna	Total		70	3	3	0	—		73	2
Sevilla	2014–15	La Liga	11	0	4	0	3 (Note: Appearances in UEFA Europa League)	0	18	0
Sevilla	Total		11	0	4	0	3	0	18	0
Deportivo	2015–16	La Liga	31	2	0	0	—		31	2
Deportivo	2016–17	La Liga	23	0	3	2	—		26	2
Deportivo	Total		54	2	3	2	—		57	4
Career total			224	8	13	2	3	0	240	10

== Honours ==
Sevilla

- UEFA Europa League: 2014–15
