= Germán Crespo =

Spanish footballer

Personal information
- Full name: Germán Crespo Sánchez
- Date of birth: 19 November 1975 (age 50)
- Place of birth: Granada, Spain
- Position: Midfielder

Team information
- Current team: Intercity (manager)

Youth career
- 1991–1992: Recreativo Granada
- 1992: Granada
- 1992–1993: Recreativo Granada
- 1993: Real Madrid

Senior career*
Years	Team	Apps	(Gls)
1993–1994	Recreativo Granada		
1994–1995	San Isidro		
1995	Adra		
1995–1996	Recreativo Granada		
1996–2000	Granada	36	(2)
2000–2002	Granada 74		

Managerial career
- 2004–2005: Arenas (youth)
- 2005–2006: Granada (assistant)
- 2006–2008: Sierra Nevada Cenes
- 2008–2009: Huétor Vega
- 2009–2014: Atarfe Industrial
- 2014–2015: Maracena
- 2016–2018: Huétor Tájar
- 2018–2019: Jaén
- 2020: Lincoln Red Imps
- 2020–2021: Córdoba B
- 2021–2023: Córdoba
- 2024: Granada B
- 2025–2026: UCAM Murcia
- 2026–: Intercity
- * Club domestic league appearances and goals

Germán Crespo Sánchez (born 19 November 1975) is a Spanish retired footballer who played as a midfielder, and is the current manager of CF Intercity.

== Playing career ==
Born in Granada, Andalusia, Crespo began his senior career with hometown side Club Recreativo Granada in Tercera División, after playing for the youth sides of Real Madrid and Granada CF. In 1996, after stints at CD San Isidro de Níjar, AD Adra and back at Recreativo, he returned to Granada, now being assigned to the main squad in Segunda División B.

After struggling severely with injuries, Crespo moved to CP Granada 74 in the fourth tier in 2000. He retired in 2002, aged just 26.

== Managerial career ==
After retiring, Crespo became the manager of Arenas CD's Cadete squad, before being named Kiki's assistant at Granada in 2005. He left the club on 1 March of the following year, and was appointed manager of CF Sierra Nevada Cenes in 2006.

After leading Sierra Nevada to Primera Andaluza in his first season, Crespo was named in charge of fellow fifth tier side Atarfe Industrial CF in 2009, after a one-year spell at CD Huétor Vega. He achieved promotion to the fourth division in 2012, and left in June 2014 to take over UD Maracena.

Crespo left Maracena in 2015, and spent a year without coaching before being appointed at CD Huétor Tájar on 25 June 2016. He was named in charge of Real Jaén on 28 May 2018, but was dismissed on 1 July of the following year.

On 4 January 2020, Crespo moved abroad after being appointed in charge of Lincoln Red Imps FC in Gibraltar. He left the side on 21 May, and was appointed manager of Córdoba CF's reserves six days later.

On 19 April 2021, Crespo was named in charge of the first team of the Blanquiverdes, replacing sacked Pablo Alfaro. He was confirmed as manager for the 2021–22 season on 18 June 2021, and led the club to promotion to Primera Federación at the end of the campaign; on 28 October 2022, he renewed his contract until 2026.

On 10 April 2023, Crespo was sacked from Córdoba after a poor run of results. On 7 January 2024, he returned to Granada after being named manager of the B-team also in the third division. On 25 June 2024, following the club's relegation; Crespo left Granada.

On 8 April 2025, after nearly a year without a club, Crespo took over UCAM Murcia CF in Segunda Federación, replacing sacked Javi Motos. Despite missing out on promotion in the play-offs, he agreed to a one-year extension on 18 June.

== Managerial statistics ==
As of 26 April 2026

Managerial record by team and tenure
Team	Nat	From	To	Record								Ref
Team	Nat	From	To	G	W	D	L	GF	GA	GD	Win %	Ref
Sierra Nevada Cenes	(Spain)	1 July 2006	30 June 2008	62	31	12	19	119	85	+34	50.00	
Huétor Vega	(Spain)	1 July 2008	30 June 2009	34	21	5	8	69	39	+30	61.76	
Atarfe Industrial	(Spain)	1 July 2009	11 June 2014	178	79	44	55	306	219	+87	44.38	
Maracena	(Spain)	11 June 2014	30 June 2015	38	16	9	13	66	52	+14	42.11	
Huétor Tájar	(Spain)	25 June 2016	28 May 2018	84	48	15	21	154	106	+48	57.14	
Jaén	(Spain)	28 May 2018	1 July 2019	48	33	7	8	104	40	+64	68.75	
Lincoln Red Imps	(Gibraltar)	4 January 2020	20 May 2020	8	6	0	2	41	6	+35	75.00	
Córdoba B	(Spain)	28 May 2020	20 April 2021	23	11	6	6	41	27	+14	47.83	
Córdoba	(Spain)	20 April 2021	10 April 2023	74	45	16	13	143	66	+77	60.81	
Granada B	(Spain)	7 January 2024	25 June 2024	20	5	2	13	19	26	−7	25.00	
UCAM Murcia	(Spain)	8 April 2025	27 April 2026	42	20	10	12	65	51	+14	47.62	
Total				611	315	126	170	1,127	717	+410	51.55	—
