= Gerard Bofill =

Spanish football manager (born 1992)

Personal information
- Full name: Gerard Bofill Vaqué
- Date of birth: 23 February 1992 (age 34)
- Place of birth: Barcelona, Spain
- Position: Right back

Team information
- Current team: Bayer Leverkusen (youth)

Youth career
- Sabadell
- Girona

Senior career*
Years	Team	Apps	(Gls)
2012–2013	Sabadell B		

Managerial career
- 2022: Sabadell B
- 2022–2023: Sabadell (assistant)
- 2023: Sabadell
- * Club domestic league appearances and goals

Gerard Bofill Vaqué (born 23 February 1992) is a Spanish retired footballer who played as a right-back, and is a manager. He is currently the head coach of Bayer Leverkusen Under-16 side.

== Playing career ==
Born in Barcelona, Catalonia, Bofill represented CE Sabadell FC and Girona FC as a youth. After finishing his formation, he returned to Sabadell after signing for the reserves in Segona Catalana.

In 2013, after achieving promotion with the B-team to Primera Catalana, Bofill had to retire after being diagnosed with a osteosarcoma in his right tibia.

== Managerial career ==
After taking a break from football, Bofill worked as a fitness coach for Girona FC B in 2016. On 30 November 2022, he returned to Sabadell and their reserve side, replacing Jordi López as manager.

Bofill's spell at Sabadell B only lasted three matches, as he became Miki Lladó's assistant in the first team late in the month. Between March and May 2023, he took over the team for six matches after Lladó was suspended. Sabadell won five and drew one in the six matches in which he was the main coach in the bench replacing Lladó.

On 10 October 2023, Bofill was named first team manager, after Lladó's dismissal. His debut match in charge of the Arquelinats occurred on 14 October 2023, a 3–1 Primera Federación away loss to CF Rayo Majadahonda.

On 19 November 2023, after another five defeats which saw the club drop to the last position of the table, Bofill was sacked.

In the beginning of 2024-25 season, he started working in the methodological area of RCD Espanyol.

On 12 June 2026, he was announced as the new head coach of the Under-16 side of German club Bayer Leverkusen.

== Personal life ==
After being diagnosed with his disease, Bofill moved to Girona and started in 2016 to build a self-sustainable house in Sant Aniol de Finestres which later became a hotel named Can Buch. The hotel opened in 2020.

== Managerial statistics ==
As of match played 20 November 2023

Managerial record by team and tenure
Team	Nat	From	To	Record								Ref
Team	Nat	From	To	G	W	D	L	GF	GA	GD	Win %	Ref
Sabadell B	(Spain)	30 November 2022	22 December 2022	3	1	2	0	3	2	+1	33.33	
Sabadell	(Spain)	10 October 2023	19 November 2023	6	0	0	6	5	15	−10	0.00	
Total				9	1	2	6	8	17	−9	11.11	—
