= Molo (footballer) =

Spanish footballer and manager

Personal information
- Full name: Manuel Jesús Casas García
- Date of birth: 14 June 1985 (age 41)
- Place of birth: Almería, Spain
- Height: 1.90 m (6 ft 3 in)
- Position: Centre back

Team information
- Current team: Alavés B (manager)

Youth career
- Oriente

Senior career*
Years	Team	Apps	(Gls)
2004–2005	Comarca Níjar		
2005–2007	Almería B	41	(8)
2006	Almería	4	(0)
2007	Figueres	16	(1)
2007–2008	Villarreal B	20	(1)
2008–2011	Osasuna B	24	(2)
2011–2012	Guijuelo	30	(1)
2012–2016	Lleida Esportiu	102	(4)
2016–2018	Lorca	28	(1)
2018	Murcia	12	(1)
2018–2019	El Ejido	25	(1)
Total		302	(20)

Managerial career
- 2019–2021: Lleida Esportiu
- 2021: Águilas
- 2022: UCAM Murcia
- 2023–2024: Tarazona
- 2024–: Alavés B
- * Club domestic league appearances and goals

Manuel Jesús Casas García (born 14 June 1985), known as Molo, is a Spanish former footballer who played as a central defender, and is the current manager of Deportivo Alavés B.

He made five appearances in Segunda División for Almería and Lorca, but spent most of his career in Segunda División B, where he played 256 games in service of eight clubs, mostly Lleida Esportiu.

== Playing career ==
Born in Almería, Andalusia, Molo played for CD Comarca de Níjar before joining UD Almería. He made his professional debut for his hometown club in Segunda División on 22 January 2006 in a 2–1 home win over CD Castellón, coming on for José Ortiz for the last eight minutes, and added three more games over the season.

Molo then moved on to UE Figueres, Villarreal CF B and CA Osasuna B in Segunda División B. In November 2008, while training with the first team of the last of those sides, he suffered an anterior cruciate ligament injury.

After a year with CD Guijuelo, Molo joined Lleida Esportiu in 2012. Four years later, after being denied promotion in the play-offs by Sevilla Atlético, he became the first signing of the renamed Lorca FC; despite his experience in the third level it was his first experience of Group IV, the one containing clubs from his own region. They gained promotion and he made his only professional appearance since the start of his career on 25 November 2017, playing the last two minutes of a 2–0 win at Gimnàstic de Tarragona.

Molo left Lorca in January 2018, returning to the third tier with Real Murcia. After being eliminated from the playoffs by Elche CF, he cancelled the last 12 months of his contract in June and made his way to CD El Ejido in the same division.

== Coaching career ==
In June 2019, shortly after El Ejido's relegation, Molo returned to Lleida to manage them for the upcoming campaign. He was dismissed by president Albert Esteve on 24 May 2021, following a descent to the fourth tier. In July 2022, he joined UCAM Murcia CF, who had recently been relegated to the fourth tier of Spanish football. He replaced José Manuel Aira.

== Managerial statistics ==
As of 8 November 2026

Managerial record by team and tenure
Team	Nat	From	To	Record								Ref
Team	Nat	From	To	G	W	D	L	GF	GA	GD	Win %	Ref
Lleida Esportiu	(Spain)	5 June 2019	24 May 2021	56	22	15	19	62	53	+9	39.29	
Águilas	(Spain)	24 June 2021	8 November 2021	10	4	4	2	12	8	+4	40.00	
UCAM Murcia	(Spain)	17 June 2022	4 October 2022	5	1	2	2	5	5	+0	20.00	
Tarazona	(Spain)	6 July 2023	6 June 2024	39	10	14	15	31	37	−6	25.64	
Alavés B	(Spain)	12 November 2024	Present	69	36	19	14	93	55	+38	52.17	
Total				179	73	54	52	203	158	+45	40.78	—
