= Armando de la Morena =

Spanish football manager (born 1977)

Personal information
- Full name: Armando de la Morena Díaz-Jorge
- Date of birth: 17 June 1977 (age 49)
- Place of birth: Madrid, Spain

Managerial career
- Years: Team
- 2000–2017: Atlético Madrid (youth)
- 2017: Atlético Baleares
- 2017–2021: Guangzhou (youth)
- 2021: Newell's Old Boys (assistant)
- 2024: Rayo Majadahonda

Armando de la Morena Díaz-Jorge (born 17 June 1977) is a Spanish football manager.

== Career ==
Born in Madrid, de la Morena began working in the youth sides of Atlético Madrid in 2000, being in charge of several youth categories before being named at the helm of the Juvenil squad in 2014. On 21 June 2017, he left the club after 17 years, after being appointed manager of Segunda División B side CD Atlético Baleares.

On 27 November 2017, de la Morena was sacked from ATB after a six-winless match run. On 17 December, he moved abroad for the first time in his career, being named manager of Guangzhou Evergrande FC's youth sides. He worked with the under-20 and under-17 teams of the club, before joining Germán Burgos' staff at Newell's Old Boys in March 2021, as an assistant.

Burgos and de la Morena parted ways in February 2022, after the Argentine was holding negotiations with Greek side Aris Thessaloniki FC. On 26 March 2024, he became CF Rayo Majadahonda's third manager of the season, but was sacked on 2 May, after just five matches.

== Managerial statistics ==
As of 27 April 2024

Managerial record by team and tenure
Team	Nat	From	To	Record								Ref
Team	Nat	From	To	G	W	D	L	GF	GA	GD	Win %	Ref
Atlético Baleares	(Spain)	21 June 2017	27 November 2017	17	3	8	6	14	17	−3	17.65	
Rayo Majadahonda	(Spain)	26 March 2024	2 May 2024	5	1	1	3	2	7	−5	20.00	
Total				22	4	9	9	16	24	−8	18.18	—
