= Fredi Álvarez =

Spanish footballer

Personal information
- Full name: Alfredo Álvarez Paredes
- Date of birth: 27 February 1976 (age 50)
- Place of birth: Moaña, Spain
- Position: Midfielder

Team information
- Current team: Celta B (manager)

Youth career
- Pontevedra

Senior career*
Years	Team	Apps	(Gls)
- Pontevedra B
1998–2000	Alondras	67	(9)
2000–2001	Ponte Ourense	32	(12)
2001–2005	Alondras	85+	(16+)

Managerial career
- 2005–2009: Alondras (assistant)
- 2009–2012: Alondras
- 2012–2014: Compostela
- 2014: Celta B
- 2016: Compostela
- 2016–2017: Boiro
- 2018: Izarra
- 2021–2023: Celta (youth)
- 2023–2024: Celta C
- 2024–: Celta B
- * Club domestic league appearances and goals

Alfredo "Fredi" Álvarez Paredes (born 27 February 1976) is a Spanish retired footballer who played as a midfielder, and is the manager of RC Celta Fortuna.

== Playing career ==
Born in Moaña, Pontevedra, Galicia, Álvarez played youth football for Pontevedra CF, and made his senior debut with the reserves in the regional leagues. In 1998, he moved to Tercera División side Alondras CF, being a regular starter during his first spell at the club.

In 2001, after scoring a career-best 12 goals for Ponte Ourense CF, Álvarez returned to Alondras. He was an undisputed starter for the side in the following four seasons, suffering relegation in 2003 and achieving immediate promotion back to the fourth tier before retiring in 2005, aged 29.

== Managerial career ==
Immediately after retiring, Álvarez started working at his last club Alondras as an assistant of Juan Carlos Andrés. In 2009, he was named manager of the club, after Andrés left for Rápido de Bouzas.

Álvarez left Alondras in June 2012, after taking the club to their best-ever campaign in the fourth tier and missing out promotion in the play-offs. On 25 October 2012, he was named manager of SD Compostela also in the fourth division.

Álvarez led Compos to a promotion to Segunda División B in his first year, but left the club for fellow third-tier side Celta de Vigo B on 20 June 2014. He was sacked from the latter on 13 November, after 12 matches.

On 14 January 2016, Álvarez returned to Compostela, but left the side in May, after suffering relegation. On 23 June 2016, he was appointed at the helm of CD Boiro also in the third tier.

On 27 March 2017, Boiro announced that Álvarez had left the club on a mutual agreement, only to confirm his continuity ahead of the club just hours later; he ultimately left in May, after their administrative relegation. He spent more than six months without a club before taking over fellow league team CD Izarra on 17 January 2018.

In August 2021, after more than three years unemployed, Álvarez returned to Celta and was appointed their Juvenil B manager. On 5 July 2023, after one season at the helm of the Juvenil A squad, he took over the C-team.

On 12 March 2024, Álvarez was appointed manager of Celta's reserves, after Claudio Giráldez was named first team manager. He signed a new two-year contract with the club on 18 June, and led the B's to a first-ever promotion to Segunda División in 2026.

On 1 July 2026, Álvarez agreed to a new two-year deal with Celta Fortuna. On his first professional match in charge on 15 August, he led the side to a 0–0 away draw against Cádiz CF.

== Managerial statistics ==
As of match played 22 November 2026

Managerial record by team and tenure
Team	Nat	From	To	Record								Ref
Team	Nat	From	To	G	W	D	L	GF	GA	GD	Win %	Ref
Alondras	(Spain)	1 July 2009	11 June 2012	114	50	36	28	165	119	+46	43.86	
Compostela	(Spain)	25 October 2012	20 June 2014	75	33	25	17	121	72	+49	44.00	
Celta B	(Spain)	20 June 2014	12 November 2014	12	5	2	5	16	16	+0	41.67	
Compostela	(Spain)	13 January 2016	16 June 2016	18	6	6	6	19	13	+6	33.33	
Boiro	(Spain)	23 June 2016	16 May 2017	39	11	12	16	40	48	−8	28.21	
Izarra	(Spain)	17 January 2018	11 June 2018	19	5	4	10	13	25	−12	26.32	
Celta C	(Spain)	5 July 2023	12 March 2024	24	13	9	2	37	20	+17	54.17	
Celta B	(Spain)	12 March 2024	Present	108	43	30	35	167	141	+26	39.81	
Career total				409	166	124	119	578	454	+124	40.59	—
