= Miguel Rivera (football manager) =

Spanish football manager (born 1961)

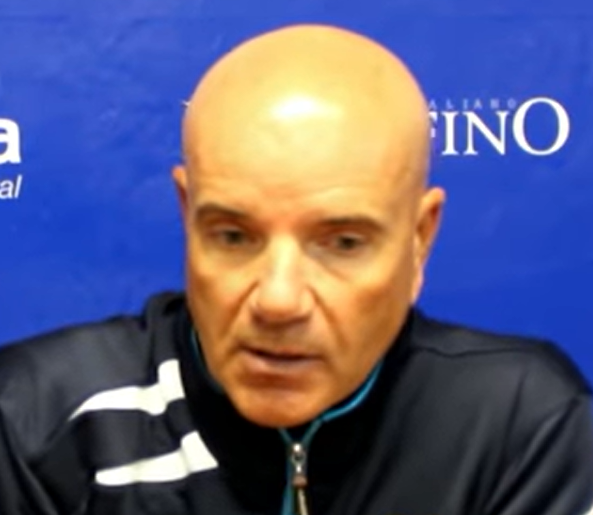
- Rivera in 2016

Personal information
- Full name: Miguel Rivera Mora
- Date of birth: 8 May 1961 (age 65)
- Place of birth: Málaga, Spain
- Height: 1.75 m (5 ft 9 in)

Team information
- Current team: Melilla (manager)

Managerial career
- Years: Team
- 1995–1996: Antequera-Puerto Malagueño
- 1996–1997: Juventud Torremolinos
- 1997–1998: Málaga B
- 1999–2001: Torredonjimeno
- 2001–2002: Linares
- 2002–2003: Cartagonova
- 2003–2004: Melilla
- 2004–2007: Écija
- 2007–2008: Águilas
- 2008–2009: Granada 74
- 2009–2010: Caravaca
- 2010–2011: Leganés
- 2012–2013: Écija
- 2014–2015: Almería B
- 2014: Almería (interim)
- 2015: Almería (interim)
- 2016–2017: Linares
- 2017–2019: Valladolid B
- 2019–2020: UCAM Murcia
- 2021: Mérida
- 2022–2023: Melilla
- 2024: Linense
- 2026–: Melilla

Miguel Rivera Mora (born 8 May 1961) is a Spanish football manager, who is currently in charge of Tercera Federación side UD Melilla.

His career was spent almost exclusively in Segunda División B, with two brief spells in interim charge of Almería in La Liga and Segunda División, respectively.

== Career ==
Born in Málaga but raised in Alhaurín de la Torre, Andalusia, Rivera began his managerial career at local CF Antequera-Puerto Malagueño, and subsequently managed neighbours Juventud de Torremolinos CF. He first arrived in Segunda División B with Cartagonova FC, after previous stints at Torredonjimeno CF and CD Linares.

After one full campaign in UD Melilla, Rivera was appointed Écija Balompié manager, with the club also in the third level. He remained in charge for three years, and joined fellow league team Águilas CF in June 2007.

Rivera took the club to a 6th place in the season, and subsequently was named Granada 74 CF manager. He stepped down from his role in January 2009, with the club in the relegation zones.

Rivera subsequently remained in the third division in the following years, managing Caravaca CF, CD Leganés, Écija and UD Almería B. He renewed his link with the latter on 22 May 2014, after finishing above the relegation zone.

On 9 December 2014 Rivera was appointed as an interim coach of the main squad, after Francisco's dismissal. Even after the signing of Juan Ignacio Martínez as a permanent manager, he appeared in his first professional match three days later, a 1–4 home loss against Real Madrid.

On 9 June 2015, after taking the B-side to a third position in the campaign (the best of the club's history) and an eventual elimination in the play-offs, Rivera renewed his contract for a further year. That October he had a second stint in interim charge of the first team, now in the second tier. On 21 December, however, he was sacked.

Rivera remained working in the third tier, at Linares Deportivo, Real Valladolid Promesas, UCAM Murcia CF and Mérida AD. After a league restructuring, he was appointed again at Melilla in the fourth-tier Segunda División RFEF on 22 February 2022, nearly 18 years after leaving the North African exclave. In his first full season, the team won promotion as group champions.

On 22 October 2023, after a winless start of the 2023–24 campaign, Rivera was sacked from Melilla. On 23 May of the following year, he was appointed manager of Real Balompédica Linense in division four, on a contract for the upcoming campaign.

On 8 October 2024, after winning one of their first six opening league games; Rivera was sacked as Real Balompédica Linense manager.

== Managerial statistics ==
As of 15 November 2026

Managerial record by team and tenure
Team	Nat	From	To	Record								Ref
Team	Nat	From	To	G	W	D	L	GF	GA	GD	Win %	Ref
Antequera-Puerto Malagueño	(Spain)	1 July 1995	30 June 1996	38	15	13	10	47	39	+8	39.47	
Juventud Torremolinos	(Spain)	1 July 1996	30 June 1997	40	16	12	12	52	47	+5	40.00	
Málaga B	(Spain)	1 July 1997	30 June 1998	40	17	13	10	54	40	+14	42.50	
Torredonjimeno	(Spain)	1 July 1999	30 June 2001	82	45	22	15	114	67	+47	54.88	
Linares	(Spain)	1 July 2001	30 June 2002	46	27	16	3	83	27	+56	58.70	
Cartagonova	(Spain)	11 December 2002	30 June 2003	23	6	10	7	15	19	−4	26.09	
Melilla	(Spain)	1 July 2003	30 June 2004	38	14	17	7	42	32	+10	36.84	
Écija	(Spain)	1 July 2004	11 July 2007	119	44	34	41	135	134	+1	36.97	
Águilas	(Spain)	11 July 2007	19 June 2008	38	16	10	12	50	38	+12	42.11	
Granada 74	(Spain)	19 June 2008	28 January 2009	24	5	6	13	21	40	−19	20.83	
Caravaca	(Spain)	22 July 2009	6 July 2010	41	13	14	14	49	48	+1	31.71	
Leganés	(Spain)	6 July 2010	17 January 2011	25	10	10	5	31	22	+9	40.00	
Écija	(Spain)	17 January 2012	30 June 2013	54	17	24	13	62	49	+13	31.48	
Almería B	(Spain)	21 January 2014	21 December 2015	72	26	21	25	86	71	+15	36.11	
Almería (interim)	(Spain)	9 December 2014	12 December 2014	1	0	0	1	1	4	−3	0.00	
Almería (interim)	(Spain)	4 October 2015	19 October 2015	3	1	1	1	5	5	+0	33.33	
Linares	(Spain)	29 June 2016	15 March 2017	33	11	8	14	37	38	−1	33.33	
Valladolid B	(Spain)	19 September 2017	21 May 2019	71	22	26	23	70	75	−5	30.99	
UCAM Murcia	(Spain)	8 October 2019	16 January 2020	15	5	4	6	18	19	−1	33.33	
Mérida	(Spain)	15 March 2021	4 June 2021	7	2	1	4	7	8	−1	28.57	
Melilla	(Spain)	22 February 2022	22 October 2023	58	24	19	15	62	44	+18	41.38	
Linense	(Spain)	23 May 2024	8 October 2024	6	1	2	3	6	11	−5	16.67	
Melilla	(Spain)	22 February 2026	Present	23	10	5	8	34	26	+8	43.48	
Total				897	347	288	262	1,081	903	+178	38.68	—
