= Antonio Iriondo =

Spanish footballer and manager

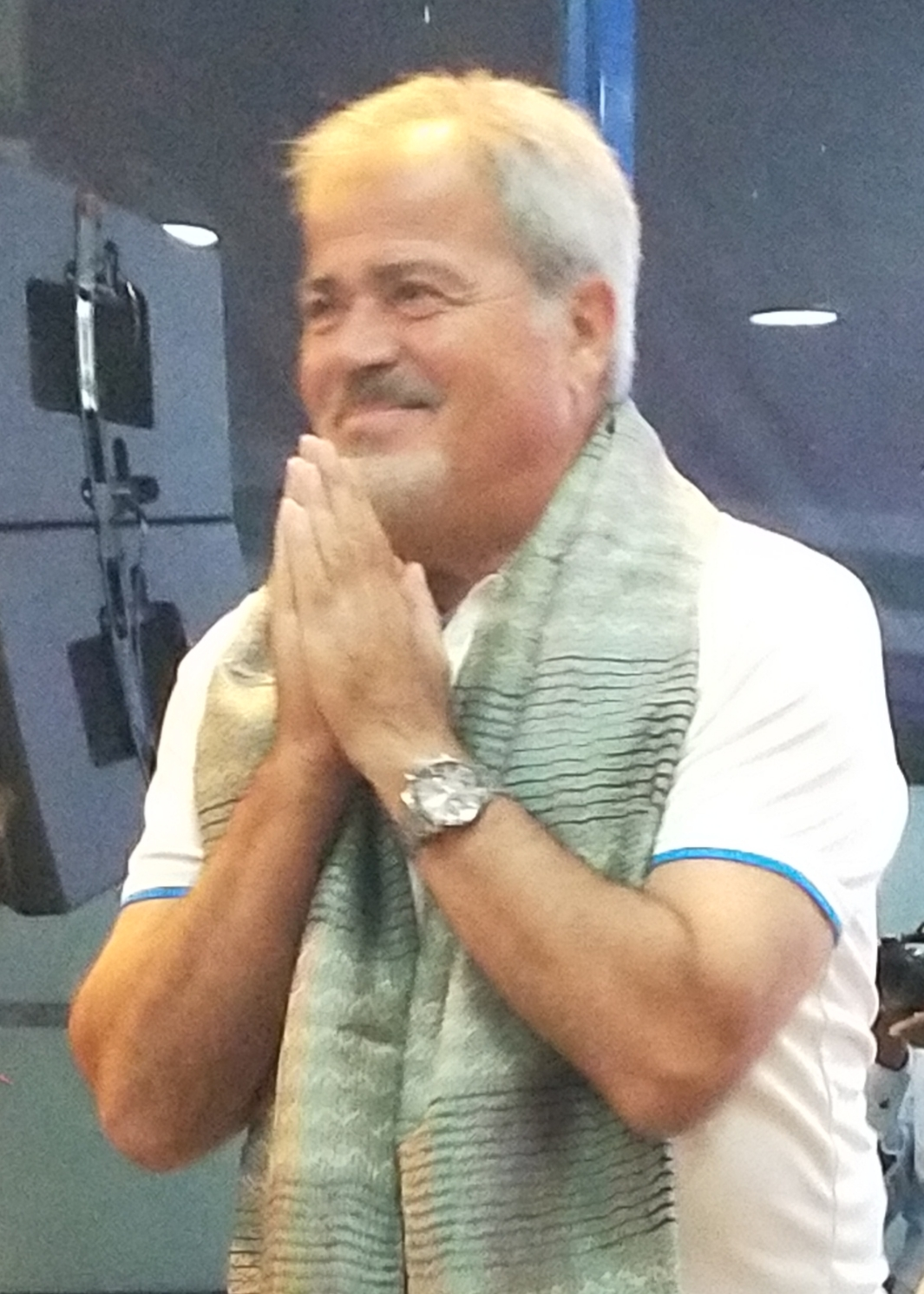
- Iriondo in 2019

Personal information
- Full name: Antonio Iriondo Ortega
- Date of birth: 3 November 1953 (age 72)
- Place of birth: Moscow, Soviet Union
- Height: 1.74 m (5 ft 9 in)
- Position: Midfielder

Youth career
- Plus Ultra
- Moscardó

Senior career*
Years	Team	Apps	(Gls)
1971–1975	Moscardó		
- Amorós
1977–1978	Alcorcón	19	(0)
1978–1979	Carabanchel	19	(0)
1979–1980	Valdemoro	12	(0)
1980–1982	Tomelloso		

Managerial career
- 1984–1987: Villaviciosa Odón
- 1987–1988: Madridejos
- 1989: Villaviciosa Odón
- 1990–1991: Villaviciosa Odón
- 1991–1992: Móstoles
- 1992–1993: Carabanchel
- 1993–1994: Rayo Majadahonda
- 1996–1998: Rayo Majadahonda
- 1998–1999: Amorós
- 1999–2000: Manchego
- 2000–2001: Madridejos
- 2001–2002: Atlético Pinto
- 2002–2003: Rayo Vallecano B
- 2003: Rayo Vallecano
- 2003–2004: Rayo Vallecano B
- 2004–2005: SS Reyes
- 2005–2007: Toledo
- 2007–2009: CD San Fernando
- 2010: Toledo
- 2011–2012: San Fernando CD
- 2012–2019: Rayo Majadahonda
- 2019–2020: Jamshedpur
- 2020–2021: Rayo Majadahonda
- 2022–2023: Sanluqueño
- * Club domestic league appearances and goals

Antonio Iriondo Ortega (born 3 November 1953) is a Spanish retired footballer who played as a midfielder and is a current manager. He has managed teams such as Rayo Vallecano, CD San Fernando and Rayo Majadahonda in Spain.

== Playing career ==
Born in Moscow to Spanish parents who, as children, had been sent to Russia in 1937 due to the Spanish Civil War, Iriondo returned to Spain in 1957 at the age of four. He only played lower league football throughout his career, representing CDC Moscardó, CP Amorós, RCD Carabanchel, AD Alcorcón, Valdemoro CF, and Tomelloso CF, retiring with the latter in 1982 at the age of 28.

== Managerial career ==
Iriondo started his managerial career at AD Villaviciosa de Odón in the regional leagues and moved to CD Móstoles in 1991. He subsequently managed lower league sides in the Community of Madrid, notably CF Rayo Majadahonda for two different spells, where he achieved promotion to Segunda División B in his third season.

Iriondo subsequently managed CD Manchego before being appointed Rayo Vallecano B manager in 2002. On 14 April 2003, he replaced the fired Gustavo Benítez at the helm of the main squad in La Liga.

Iriondo remained in charge for nine matches, suffering relegation as dead last. After returning to the B-side in July 2003, he was named UD San Sebastián de los Reyes manager the following February.

Subsequently, Iriondo was appointed at the helm of CD Toledo (two stints), CD San Fernando, San Fernando CD (two stints) and Rayo Majadahonda. With the latter he achieved promotion to the third division in 2015, and took the clubs to the play-offs for the first time in their history in 2017.

On 27 May 2018, Iriondo achieved promotion to Segunda División with the Majariegos, after beating FC Cartagena in the play-offs. On 11 June of the following year, after suffering relegation, he resigned.

On 26 July 2019, Iriondo was named manager of the Indian Super League side Jamshedpur FC. After missing the playoffs in his one year at the Tata Steel-owned franchise, he returned to Majadahonda on a one-season deal with the option of a second.

== Managerial statistics ==
As of 10 November 2023

Managerial record by team and tenure
Team	Nat	From	To	Record								Ref
Team	Nat	From	To	G	W	D	L	GF	GA	GD	Win %	Ref
Carabanchel	(Spain)	31 May 1992	25 May 1993	38	14	9	15	62	65	−3	36.84	
Villaviciosa	(Spain)	10 June 1993	12 June 1994	34	13	8	13	55	58	−3	38.24	
Rayo Majadahonda	(Spain)	12 June 1994	16 February 1998	165	79	36	50	257	196	+61	47.88	
Amorós	(Spain)	30 June 1998	1 July 1999	46	23	8	15	66	53	+13	50.00	
Manchego	(Spain)	1 July 1999	16 May 2000	38	11	16	11	41	41	+0	28.95	
Madridejos	(Spain)	1 June 2000	22 May 2001	38	13	10	15	69	79	−10	34.21	
Atlético Pinto	(Spain)	22 May 2001	4 June 2002	40	18	10	12	60	45	+15	45.00	
Rayo Vallecano B	(Spain)	4 June 2002	14 April 2003	32	18	7	7	63	41	+22	56.25	
Rayo Vallecano	(Spain)	14 April 2003	1 July 2003	9	0	5	4	5	18	−13	0.00	
Rayo Vallecano B	(Spain)	1 July 2003	23 February 2004	24	8	7	9	30	32	−2	33.33	
SS Reyes	(Spain)	23 February 2004	1 June 2005	50	19	11	20	57	58	−1	38.00	
Toledo	(Spain)	25 July 2005	4 July 2007	84	46	16	22	136	78	+58	54.76	
CD San Fernando	(Spain)	4 July 2007	22 February 2009	73	31	20	22	104	91	+13	42.47	
Toledo	(Spain)	19 January 2010	25 May 2010	15	4	4	7	15	24	−9	26.67	
San Fernando CD	(Spain)	29 December 2011	30 June 2012	25	15	6	4	50	19	+31	60.00	
Rayo Majadahonda	(Spain)	15 July 2012	11 June 2019	274	117	69	88	391	318	+73	42.70	
Jamshedpur	(India)	26 July 2019	31 May 2020	18	4	6	8	22	35	−13	22.22	
Rayo Majadahonda	(Spain)	1 June 2020	8 March 2021	17	7	4	6	15	15	+0	41.18	
Sanluqueño	(Spain)	9 May 2022	30 October 2023	50	24	14	12	71	51	+20	48.00	
Total				1,070	464	266	340	1,569	1,317	+252	43.36	—

== See also ==
- List of football managers with the most matches
