= Xabi Huarte =

Spanish footballer

Personal information
- Full name: Xabier Huarte Armendáriz
- Date of birth: 25 February 2001 (age 25)
- Place of birth: Pamplona, Spain
- Height: 1.72 m (5 ft 8 in)
- Position: Midfielder

Team information
- Current team: Tondela
- Number: 14

Youth career
- 2014–2020: Osasuna

Senior career*
Years	Team	Apps	(Gls)
2020–2021	Subiza	24	(5)
2021–2025	Osasuna B	120	(15)
2024–2025	Osasuna	1	(0)
2025–	Tondela	5	(0)
- * Club domestic league appearances and goals as of 25 May 2026

Xabier "Xabi" Huarte Armendáriz (born 25 February 2001) is a Spanish professional footballer who plays as a midfielder for Portuguese Primeira Liga club Tondela.

== Career ==
Born in Pamplona, Navarre, Huarte joined CA Osasuna's youth setup in 2014, aged 13. After finishing his formation, he made his senior debut with farm team CD Subiza on 25 October 2020, starting in a 1–1 Tercera División away draw against UCD Burladés.

Huarte started to feature with the reserves in February 2021, and scored his first senior goal late in the month, netting Subiza's second in a 3–3 away draw against CD River Ega. On 30 December 2022, after establishing himself as a regular starter for the B's, he renewed his contract until 2025.

In August 2023, Huarte suffered an anterior cruciate ligament injury, being sidelined until February 2024. He made his first team – and La Liga – debut on 5 May, coming on as a late substitute for fellow youth graduate Iker Muñoz in a 2–0 home loss to Real Betis.

On 16 July 2025, Huarte signed with Tondela in the Portuguese top tier.
