= UCAM Murcia CF =

Association football club in Spain

UCAM Murcia
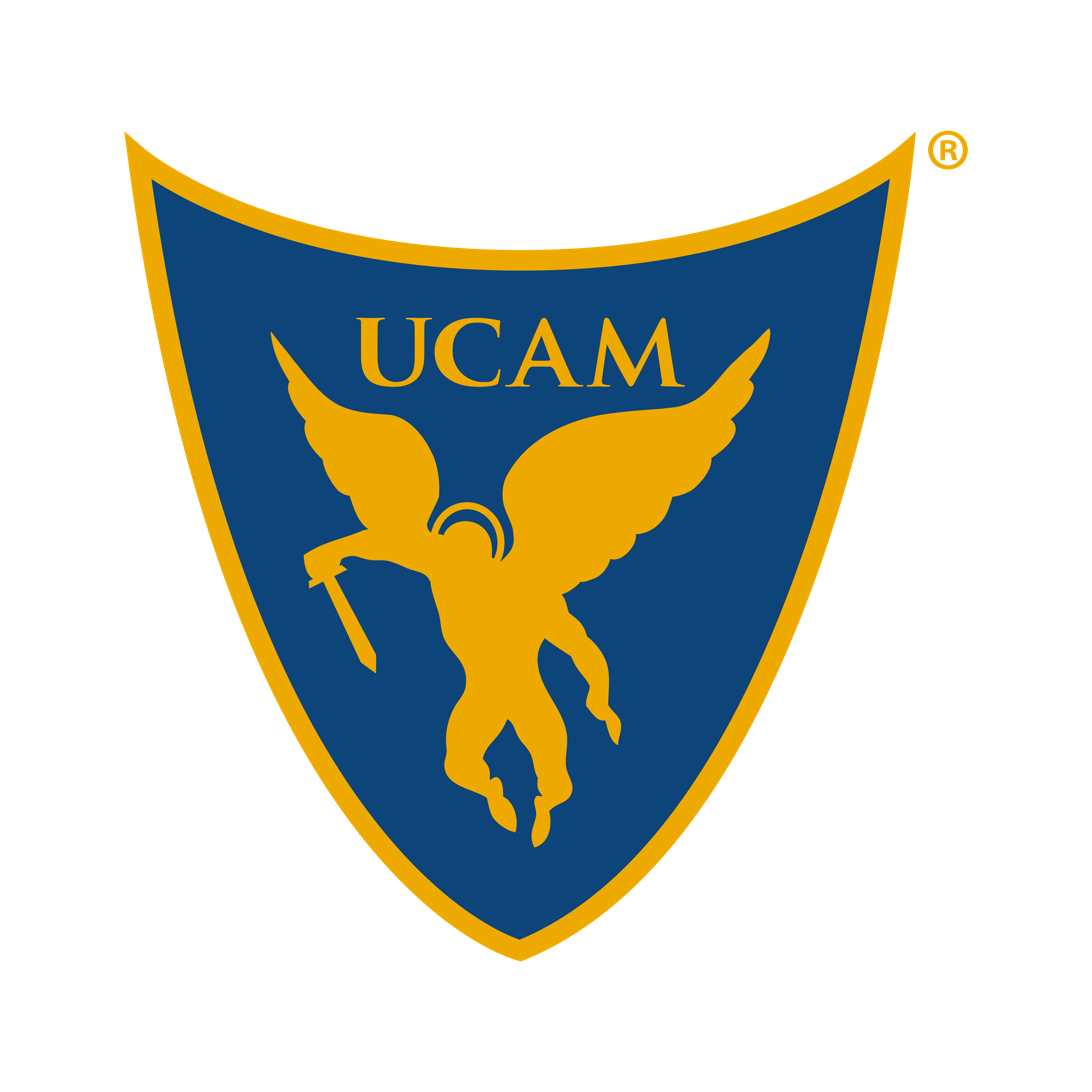
- Full name: UCAM Universidad Católica de Murcia Club de Fútbol
- Nickname: Universitarios
- Founded: 1999; 27 years ago
- Ground: La Condomina, Murcia, Spain
- Capacity: 6,500
- Owner: Universidad Católica de Murcia
- President: José Luis Mendoza
- Head coach: Germán Crespo
- League: Segunda Federación – Group 3
- 2025–26: Segunda Federación – Group 4, 7th of 18
- Website: ucamcf.es
Home colours	Away colours

Universidad Católica de Murcia Club de Fútbol, commonly known as UCAM Murcia or simply UCAM, is a Spanish football club based in Murcia. Founded in 1999 it plays in Segunda Federación – Group 3, holding home games at Estadio de La Condomina, with a capacity of 6,500 spectators.

== History ==
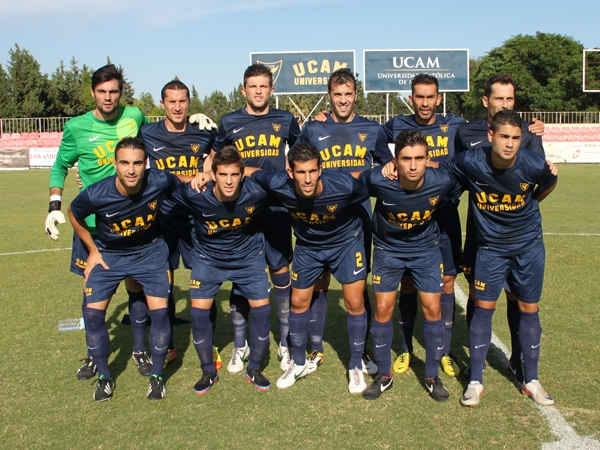
A starting lineup in the 2013–14 season, that promoted to Segunda División B

Universidad Católica San Antonio de Murcia Club de Fútbol was founded in 1999 and had previously a team which played in Tercera División from 2000 to 2005. In parallel was founded in 2004 the Club de Fútbol Los Garres, making its first appearance in Tercera División in 2008–09 as Murcia Deportivo Club de Fútbol. In 2009 a businessman from Beniaján, Murcia, acquired the club and moved it to his local town; one year later the club relocated again, now to Sangonera la Verde, and, in 2011, UCAM became its new owner.

At the end of the 2011–12 season, after Orihuela suffered relegation from Segunda División B due to irregularities, UCAM Murcia took its place. After suffering relegation, the club bounced back to the third level immediately, and achieved a respectable second place in his group during the 2014–15 campaign; it missed out promotion in the play-offs, after being knocked out by Bilbao Athletic B, which would later achieve promotion.

In the 2015–16 season, UCAM Murcia finished the regular season as champions of the Group 4, six points ahead of neighbours Real Murcia. The club achieved the promotion to Segunda División in the play-offs after beating Real Madrid Castilla 4–3 on aggregate.

The first season of UCAM in the second flight would be short-lived, as they ended in the 19th position, and subsequently relegated to the third tier, after being defeated in a do-or-die game by Gimnàstic de Tarragona in the last matchday. In the 2018–19 season the club finished 5th with 66 points in the Segunda División B, Group 4.

=== Club names ===
- Murcia Deportivo Club de Fútbol (1999–2005)
- Murcia Deportivo-Rincón de Seca Club de Fútbol (2007–2008)
- Murcia Deportivo Club de Fútbol-UCAM (2008–2009)
- Costa Cálida-Beniaján Club de Fútbol (2009–2010)
- Costa Cálida-Sangonera Club de Fútbol (2010–2011)
- UCAM Murcia Club de Fútbol (2011–2015)
- UCAM Universidad Católica de Murcia Club de Fútbol (2015–present)

== Season to season ==
=== Old UCAM Murcia ===
Season	Tier	Division	Place	Copa del Rey
1999–2000	5	Terr. Pref.	1st	
2000–01	4	3ª	14th	
2001–02	4	3ª	10th	
2002–03	4	3ª	11th	
2003–04	4	3ª	16th	
2004–05	4	3ª	19th	

=== Los Garres ===
Season	Tier	Division	Place	Copa del Rey
2004–05	6	1ª Terr.	4th	
2005–06	6	1ª Terr.	1st	

=== Murcia Deportivo ===
Season	Tier	Division	Place	Copa del Rey
2006–07	5	Terr. Pref.	10th	
2007–08	5	Terr. Pref.	4th	
2008–09	4	3ª	12th	

=== Costa Cálida ===
Season	Tier	Division	Place	Copa del Rey
2009–10	4	3ª	4th	
2010–11	4	3ª	1st	

=== New UCAM Murcia CF ===
Season	Tier	Division	Place	Copa del Rey
2011–12	4	3ª	6th	Second round
2012–13	3	2ª B	17th	
2013–14	4	3ª	1st	
2014–15	3	2ª B	2nd	Third round
2015–16	3	2ª B	1st	Third round
2016–17	2	2ª	19th	Round of 32
2017–18	3	2ª B	7th	First round
2018–19	3	2ª B	5th	Second round
2019–20	3	2ª B	10th	Second round
2020–21	3	2ª B	1st / 2nd	First round
2021–22	3	1ª RFEF	18th	First round
2022–23	4	2ª Fed.	5th	
2023–24	4	2ª Fed.	8th	First round
2024–25	4	2ª Fed.	3rd	
2025–26	4	2ª Fed.	7th	First round
2026–27	4	2ª Fed.		

- 1 season in Segunda División
- 1 season in Primera División RFEF
- 8 seasons in Segunda División B
- 4 seasons in Segunda Federación
- 8 seasons in Tercera División

== Support ==
UCAM Murcia's highest home attendance is 5,877, in a 2016–17 Segunda División match against Rayo Vallecano. The club's two main supporters groups are Los T-UCAM who were founded in 2015 and Los Blue Gold who were founded in 2016.

== Current squad ==
As of 8 February 2026

Note: Flags indicate national team as defined under FIFA eligibility rules; some limited exceptions apply. Players may hold more than one non-FIFA nationality.

No.	Pos.	Nation	Player
1	GK	URU	Facundo Ackermann
2	DF	ESP	José Ruiz
3	DF	ESP	Jeremy Socorro
4	DF	ESP	Javi Ramírez
5	DF	ESP	Fernando Román
6	DF	GAM	Omar Jaiteh
7	FW	ESP	Álvaro Hernáiz
8	MF	ESP	Urtzi Urzelay
9	FW	ESP	Sergi Baldrich
10	MF	ESP	Iván Moreno
11	FW	ESP	Dani Aquino
13	GK	ESP	Fernando Montoya

No.	Pos.	Nation	Player
14	MF	ESP	Pablo Hernández
15	DF	ESP	Nacho Martínez
16	FW	ESP	Ale Marín
17	MF	ESP	Álex Bueno
18	FW	ESP	Juan Carlos Pontones
19	MF	ESP	Juanma Bravo
20	MF	ESP	Alberto Soto
21	DF	ESP	Aitor Puñal
22	FW	MAR	Mohamed Mizzian
28	DF	ESP	Héctor Fernández
32	MF	ESP	Xente Vila
—	FW	ESP	Julio Martínez

== Honours ==
- Segunda División B
  - Champions (1): 2015–16
- Tercera División
  - Champions (2): 2010–11, 2013–14

== Coaches ==
- (Spain) Luis Tevenet (2012–13)
- (Uruguay) Gabriel Correa (2013–14)
- (Spain) Eloy Jiménez (2014–15)
- (Spain) José María Salmerón (2015–16)
- (Spain) Francisco (2016–17)
- (Spain) Lluís Planagumà (2017)
- (Spain) José Miguel Campos (2017–2018)
- (Spain) Pedro Munitis (2018–2019)
- (Spain) Juan Merino (2019)
- (Spain) Rubén Albés (2019)
- (Spain) Miguel Rivera (2019–2020)
- (Spain) Sergio Aracil (2020)
- (Spain) Asier Santana (2020)
- (Spain) José María Salmerón (2020–present)
