= Carlos Cura =

Spanish football manager

Personal information
- Full name: Carlos Eduardo Cura Hernanz
- Date of birth: 13 March 1987 (age 39)
- Place of birth: Madrid, Spain
- Position: Midfielder

Team information
- Current team: Real Madrid Cadete A (manager)

Senior career*
| Years | Team | Apps | (Gls) |
- Orcasitas
- Carabanchel
- Aviación
| 2010–2012 | Moratalaz | | |

Managerial career
- 2012–2017: Atlético Madrid (youth)
- 2017: Atlético Baleares (assistant)
- 2018: Canillas B
- 2018–2019: Intersoccer Madrid
- 2019–2021: Ursaria
- 2021–2022: Moscardó
- 2022: El Álamo
- 2022–2023: Paracuellos Antamira
- 2023: Rayo Majadahonda
- 2025: Estepona
- 2025–: Real Madrid (youth)
- * Club domestic league appearances and goals

Carlos Eduardo Cura Hernanz (born 13 March 1987) is a Spanish retired footballer who played as a midfielder, and the manager of Real Madrid's Cadete A squad.

== Playing career ==
Cura was born in Madrid, and represented lowly AD Orcasitas, RCD Carabanchel, CD Aviación and ED Moratalaz. He retired with the latter in 2012, aged just 25.

== Managerial career ==
Shortly after retiring, Cura began his managerial career with Atlético Madrid's youth sides, being an assistant of Armando de la Morena in the Juvenil B squad. In June 2017, he followed the manager to CD Atlético Baleares as his assistant, but the duo left in November after being sacked.

In February 2018, Cura was named manager of CD Canillas' reserve team in the Primera de Aficionados, but left in June to take over AC Intersoccer Madrid in the Segunda de Aficionados. On 21 November 2019, after promoting the latter club to the sixth tier, he was appointed in charge of CDE Ursaria in the Preferente.

Cura renewed with Ursaria on 2 June 2020, and finished the season with a first-ever promotion to Tercera División RFEF; despite the club's promotion, his contract was not renewed. On 25 October 2021, he was named at the helm of CDC Moscardó also in the fifth division.

Cura resigned from Moscardó on 17 January 2022, with the club in the last position, and was named CD El Álamo manager on 28 April. He left the latter on a mutual agreement on 15 June, and took over CF Rayo Majadahonda's farm team CD Paracuellos Antamira eight days later.

On 12 June 2023, after missing out promotion with Paracuellos in the play-offs, Cura was named manager of the Majariegos' first team in Primera Federación. He was sacked on 22 December, with the club in the relegation zone.

== Managerial statistics ==
As of 31 May 2025

Managerial record by team and tenure
| Team | Nat | From | To | Record | | | | | | | | Ref |
| Team | Nat | From | To | G | W | D | L | GF | GA | GD | Win % | Ref |
|---|---|---|---|---|---|---|---|---|---|---|---|---|
| Canillas B | (Spain) | 12 February 2018 | 6 June 2018 | 15 | 7 | 4 | 4 | 21 | 14 | +7 | 46.67 | |
| Intersoccer Madrid | (Spain) | 6 June 2018 | 19 November 2019 | 44 | 32 | 8 | 4 | 132 | 36 | +96 | 72.73 | |
| Ursaria | (Spain) | 19 November 2019 | 30 June 2021 | 32 | 18 | 8 | 6 | 53 | 32 | +21 | 56.25 | |
| Moscardó | (Spain) | 25 October 2021 | 17 January 2022 | 14 | 2 | 2 | 10 | 8 | 23 | −15 | 14.29 | |
| El Álamo | (Spain) | 28 April 2022 | 15 June 2022 | 6 | 1 | 1 | 4 | 7 | 11 | −4 | 16.67 | |
| Paracuellos Antamira | (Spain) | 23 June 2022 | 12 June 2023 | 32 | 14 | 8 | 10 | 51 | 43 | +8 | 43.75 | |
| Rayo Majadahonda | (Spain) | 12 June 2023 | 22 December 2023 | 17 | 3 | 6 | 8 | 14 | 23 | −9 | 17.65 | |
| Estepona | (Spain) | 7 January 2025 | 30 June 2025 | 21 | 10 | 8 | 3 | 29 | 20 | +9 | 47.62 | |
| Total | | | | 181 | 87 | 45 | 49 | 315 | 202 | +113 | 48.07 | — |
