= Carlos Martínez (footballer, born 1980) =

Spanish footballer

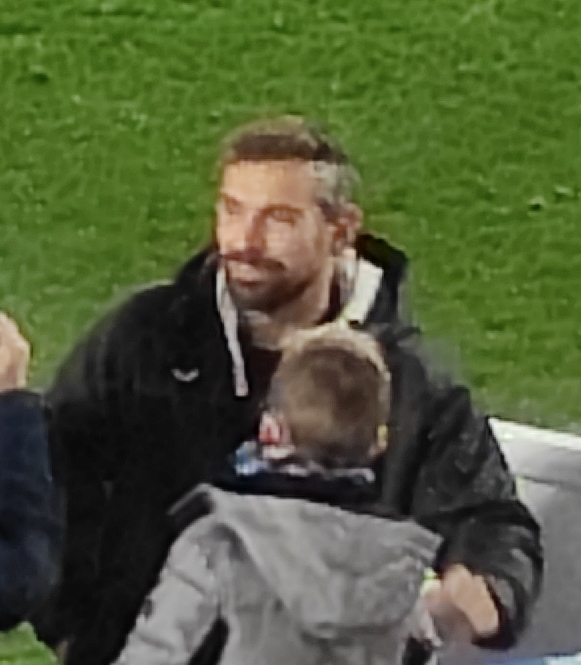
- Martínez in 2021

Personal information
- Full name: Carlos Martínez Fernández
- Date of birth: 13 November 1980 (age 46)
- Place of birth: Llerena, Spain
- Height: 1.78 m (5 ft 10 in)
- Position: Winger

Team information
- Current team: Rayo Majadahonda (manager)

Youth career
- Llerenense

Senior career*
Years	Team	Apps	(Gls)
1999–2000	Llerenense		
2000–2002	Atlético Aviación		
2002	Getafe	3	(0)
2002–2003	Atlético Aviación		
2003–2004	Getafe B		
2004–2005	Aranjuez		
2005–2006	Parla		
2006–2007	Ofigevi		
2007	Villanueva	11	(1)
2007–2010	Leganés	87	(5)
2010–2012	Alcorcón	46	(1)
2012–2014	Leganés	65	(14)
2014–2015	Fuenlabrada	35	(5)

Managerial career
- 2016: Dalian Yifang (assistant)
- 2018: Al-Ettifaq U23
- 2018–2019: Al-Ettifaq (assistant)
- 2019: Leganés B (assistant)
- 2019–2020: Leganés (assistant)
- 2020–2023: Leganés B
- 2023: Leganés
- 2023–2024: Fuenlabrada
- 2025–2026: Saudi Arabia U19 (assistant)
- 2026: Leganés
- 2026: Saudi Arabia U19 (assistant)
- 2026–: Rayo Majadahonda
- * Club domestic league appearances and goals

Carlos Martínez Fernández (born 13 November 1980) is a Spanish retired footballer who played as a left winger, and is the current manager of Primera Federación side CF Rayo Majadahonda.

== Playing career ==
Born in Llerena, Badajoz, Extremadura, Martínez only played amateur football well into his 20s. In 2007, he joined Segunda División B side CD Leganés, being a regular starter for the club during his three-year spell.

On 28 July 2010, Martínez signed for AD Alcorcón, newly promoted to Segunda División. He made his professional debut on 29 August of that year at the age of 29, coming on as a second-half substitute for goalscorer Fernando Sales in a 1–1 away draw against Albacete Balompié.

Martínez scored his first and only goal in division two on 10 April 2011, netting his team's fourth in a 4–1 away routing of Córdoba CF. In July of the following year, after being sparingly used, he returned to his former side Leganés, scoring a career-best 11 goals in his first season and helping the team achieve promotion in his second.

Martínez retired in 2015, aged 34, after featuring regularly for third division side CF Fuenlabrada.

== Managerial career ==
Shortly after retiring, Martínez started working as a fitness coach in Atlético Madrid's youth setup, before moving to China and Saudi Arabia. On 8 July 2019, he returned to Lega after being named Luis Cembranos' assistant in the B-team. He moved to the first team after Cembranos took over the main squad in an interim manner, but remained in the staff after the appointment of Javier Aguirre.

On 10 September 2020, Martínez was announced as manager of Leganés' B-team. On 4 April 2023, he was named manager of the first team, after Imanol Idiakez was sacked.

Martínez helped Lega to avoid relegation, but departed on 6 June 2023 after the club only offered him to be a part of the staff. Fourteen days later, he took over Primera Federación side CF Fuenlabrada.

Martínez was sacked by Fuenla on 22 April 2024, after a run of five winless matches. On 26 May 2026, he returned to Leganés and was appointed manager ahead of the last match of the campaign, and avoided relegation before returning to his previous role as the assistant of the Saudi Arabia national under-19 team.

On 15 November 2026, Martínez returned to Spain and was appointed manager of third division side CF Rayo Majadahonda, replacing sacked Guille Fernández.

== Personal life ==
Martínez's younger brother Robert was also a footballer. A central midfielder, he never appeared in any higher than the third division.

== Managerial statistics ==
As of 20 April 2024

Managerial record by team and tenure
Team	Nat	From	To	Record								Ref
Team	Nat	From	To	G	W	D	L	GF	GA	GD	Win %	Ref
Leganés B	(Spain)	20 July 2020	4 April 2023	88	36	26	26	110	85	+25	40.91	
Leganés (interim)	(Spain)	4 April 2023	6 June 2023	8	4	1	3	9	7	+2	50.00	
Fuenlabrada	(Spain)	20 June 2023	22 April 2024	33	9	11	13	29	37	−8	27.27	
Leganés	(Spain)	26 May 2026	3 June 2026	1	1	0	0	1	0	+1	100.00	
Rayo Majadahonda	(Spain)	15 November 2026	Present	0	0	0	0	0	0	+0	—	
Total				130	50	38	42	149	129	+20	38.46	—
