= Óscar Fernández (football manager, born 1974) =

Spanish football manager (born 1974)

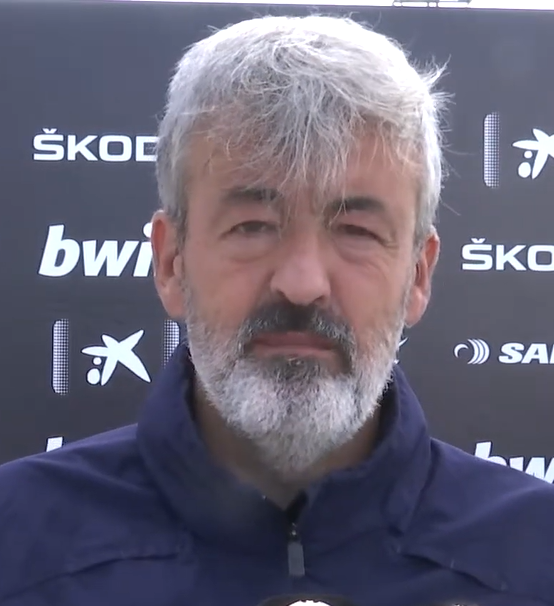
- Fernández in 2021

Personal information
- Full name: Óscar Rubén Fernández Romero
- Date of birth: 28 September 1974 (age 52)
- Place of birth: Valencia, Spain

Team information
- Current team: Al Shahaniya (assistant)

Managerial career
- Years: Team
- Tavernes Blanques
- Torre Levante (youth)
- 2005–2006: Burjassot
- 2006–2007: Valencia (youth)
- 2007–2010: Valencia B
- 2007: Valencia (interim)
- 2011: Huracán Valencia
- 2011: Asteras Tripolis
- 2011–2012: Gandía
- 2012–2015: Qatar U17
- 2015–2016: Atlético Madrid (youth)
- 2016–2019: Atlético Madrid B
- 2019: Almería
- 2020–2021: Valencia B
- 2021–2023: Almería B
- 2023: Linares
- 2024–2025: Real Sociedad C
- 2025–: Al Shahaniya (assistant)

Óscar Rubén Fernández Romero (born 28 September 1974) is a Spanish football manager. He is the current assistant manager of Qatari club Al Shahaniya SC.

== Coaching career ==
Born in Torrefiel, Valencia, Fernández graduated from the University of Valencia and started his career at Tavernes Blanques CF before moving to CF Torre Levante's youth categories. In 2005, he was appointed manager of Burjassot CF in Tercera División.

Fernández moved to Valencia CF in 2006, being named manager of the Juvenil squad. In July of the following year, he was appointed at the helm of the reserves in the fourth division, and on 29 October 2007, after Quique Sánchez Flores was sacked from the main squad, he was appointed interim. His first professional match occurred two days later, a 5–1 loss against Real Madrid.

Fernández managed the Che for one further match, a 2–0 away defeat of RCD Mallorca, and subsequently returned to the B-team after the appointment of Ronald Koeman. He left the club in 2010, and spent a year without work before being appointed at newly formed side Huracán Valencia CF in June 2011.

On 16 June 2011, Fernández announced his departure from Huracán, after having accepted an offer from Super League Greece side Asteras Tripolis. In September, however, after only three matches, he was sacked.

On 24 October 2011, Fernández returned to Spain and was presented as manager of fourth division side CF Gandía. On 20 September of the following year, he moved to Qatar to work for Aspire Academy, being manager of the national under-17 team.

On 10 July 2015, Fernández was appointed manager of Atlético Madrid's Juvenil A squad. Roughly one year later he took over the B-team, achieving promotion to Segunda División B in 2017 and reaching the third division play-offs in 2019.

On 15 June 2019, Fernández was named UD Almería manager in Segunda División, replacing departing Fran Fernández. On 3 August, however, after the club's change of owner, he reached an agreement to terminate his contract.

On 4 August 2020, Fernández returned Valencia and its reserve team, with the side now in the third division. He left the club the following 17 June, and returned to Almería four days later, now named manager of the B-team in Tercera División RFEF.

On 4 July 2023, Fernández was named in charge of Primera Federación side Linares Deportivo, but was dismissed on 22 November.

== Managerial statistics ==
As of 23 November 2023

Managerial record by team and tenure
Team	Nat	From	To	Record								Ref
Team	Nat	From	To	G	W	D	L	GF	GA	GD	Win %	Ref
Burjassot	(Spain)	1 July 2005	30 June 2006	42	22	9	11	65	38	+27	52.38	
Valencia Mestalla	(Spain)	1 July 2007	30 June 2010	118	42	34	42	156	129	+27	35.59	
Valencia (interim)	(Spain)	29 October 2007	4 November 2007	2	1	0	1	3	5	−2	50.00	
Huracán Valencia	(Spain)	2 June 2011	15 June 2011	0	0	0	0	0	0	+0	—	
Asteras Tripolis	(Greece)	15 June 2011	19 September 2011	3	0	1	2	1	4	−3	0.00	
Gandía	(Spain)	24 October 2011	23 September 2012	33	8	12	13	28	37	−9	24.24	
Atlético Madrid B	(Spain)	29 June 2016	14 June 2019	118	56	31	31	167	120	+47	47.46	
Almería	(Spain)	15 June 2019	3 August 2019	0	0	0	0	0	0	+0	—	
Valencia Mestalla	(Spain)	4 August 2020	17 June 2021	26	2	12	12	24	35	−11	7.69	
Almería B	(Spain)	21 June 2021	7 June 2023	52	27	11	14	93	53	+40	51.92	
Linares	(Spain)	4 July 2023	22 November 2023	14	3	4	7	10	17	−7	21.43	
Total				408	161	114	133	547	438	+109	39.46	—
