= CF Rayo Majadahonda =

Association football club in Spain

Rayo Majadahonda
- Full name: Club de Fútbol Rayo Majadahonda, S.A.D.
- Nickname: Majariegos
- Founded: 7 June 1976; 50 years ago
- Stadium: Estadio Cerro del Espino
- Capacity: 3,800
- Owner: Javier Ruiz Poo
- President: Enrique Vedia
- Head coach: Carlos Martínez
- League: Primera Federación – Group 2
- 2025–26: Segunda Federación – Group 5, 1st of 18 (champions)
- Website: www.rayomajadahonda.com
Home colours	Away colours

Club de Fútbol Rayo Majadahonda, S.A.D. (Spanish pronunciation: [ˈraʝo maxaðaˈonda]) is a Spanish professional football club in Majadahonda, in the autonomous community of Madrid. Founded in 1976 it plays in Primera Federación – Group 2, holding home games at Estadio Cerro del Espino, with a capacity of 3,800 seats.

== History ==
Rayo Majadahonda was founded in 1976, being immediately registered in the Madrid Football Federation. It played in the regional divisions until 1987 when it achieved promotion to Tercera División. The club entered this new period with the new president Enrique Vedia, starting from 30 June 1987.

The club established themselves in the fourth division until the 1996–97 campaign, when it achieved a first-ever promotion to Segunda División B. Two consecutive relegations followed, but the club immediately regained their national status in 2000. Then, it subsequently remained in the fourth level until 2015 (only split by a one-season spell in the third division), when it achieved promotion with club legend Antonio Iriondo as manager.

On 27 May 2018, Rayo Majadahonda promoted for the first time ever to Segunda División by beating FC Cartagena with a last-minute own goal from Míchel Zabaco, with Iriondo still in charge of the first team. A year later, after suffering instant relegation, he resigned. In the second tier, the club played its home games at Atlético Madrid's Wanda Metropolitano due to the insufficient facilities at the Estadio Cerro del Espino.

As part of the conditions of playing in the fully professional second division, Rayo Majadahonda had a year to establish a Sociedad Anónima Deportiva, a form of public limited company that all its teams must be. The initial majority shareholder in September 2019 was Alejandro Arribas, a player formed at the club who was still playing professionally for Real Oviedo at the time.

Also in September, 2019 José María Sanz became club's new president.

== Season to season ==
Season	Tier	Division	Place	Copa del Rey
1976–77	8	3ª Reg.	1st	
1977–78	8	3ª Reg. P.	12th	
1978–79	8	3ª Reg. P.	17th	
1979–80	9	3ª Reg.	1st	
1980–81	8	3ª Reg. P.	3rd	
1981–82	8	3ª Reg. P.	1st	
1982–83	7	2ª Reg.	1st	
1983–84	6	1ª Reg.	2nd	
1984–85	5	Reg. Pref.	6th	
1985–86	5	Reg. Pref.	4th	
1986–87	5	Reg. Pref.	2nd	
1987–88	4	3ª	5th	
1988–89	4	3ª	15th	
1989–90	4	3ª	14th	
1990–91	4	3ª	11th	
1991–92	4	3ª	5th	
1992–93	4	3ª	8th	First round
1993–94	4	3ª	11th	
1994–95	4	3ª	2nd	
1995–96	4	3ª	1st	

Season	Tier	Division	Place	Copa del Rey
1996–97	4	3ª	1st	
1997–98	3	2ª B	18th	
1998–99	4	3ª	20th	
1999–2000	5	Reg. Pref.	1st	
2000–01	4	3ª	1st	
2001–02	4	3ª	14th	Preliminary
2002–03	4	3ª	4th	
2003–04	3	2ª B	20th	
2004–05	4	3ª	8th	
2005–06	4	3ª	9th	
2006–07	4	3ª	10th	
2007–08	4	3ª	12th	
2008–09	4	3ª	3rd	
2009–10	4	3ª	9th	
2010–11	4	3ª	10th	
2011–12	4	3ª	11th	
2012–13	4	3ª	8th	
2013–14	4	3ª	7th	
2014–15	4	3ª	1st	
2015–16	3	2ª B	14th	First round

Season	Tier	Division	Place	Copa del Rey
2016–17	3	2ª B	4th	
2017–18	3	2ª B	1st	First round
2018–19	2	2ª	19th	Third round
2019–20	3	2ª B	6th	Second round
2020–21	3	2ª B	4th / 1st	First round
2021–22	3	1ª RFEF	4th	Round of 32
2022–23	3	1ª Fed.	14th	First round
2023–24	3	1ª Fed.	20th	
2024–25	4	2ª Fed.	4th	
2025–26	4	2ª Fed.	1st	First round
2026–27	3	1ª Fed.		TBD

- 1 season in Segunda División
- 4 seasons in Primera Federación/Primera División RFEF
- 7 seasons in Segunda División B
- 2 season in Segunda Federación
- 25 seasons in Tercera División

== Current squad ==
As of 5 November 2026

Note: Flags indicate national team as defined under FIFA eligibility rules; some limited exceptions apply. Players may hold more than one non-FIFA nationality.

No.	Pos.	Nation	Player
1	GK	ESP	Toni Fuidias
2	DF	ESP	Choco
3	DF	ESP	Ale Díez
4	DF	ESP	Dani Ramos
5	DF	ESP	Dani Gallardo
6	MF	ESP	David del Pozo
7	FW	ESP	Gonzalo Calçada
8	MF	ESP	Antonio Amaro
9	FW	WAL	Josh Farrell
10	MF	ESP	Jeremy Jorge (on loan from Tenerife)
11	FW	ESP	Raúl Hernández
13	GK	ESP	Miguel Prieto

No.	Pos.	Nation	Player
14	MF	JPN	Yuya Yoshimura
15	MF	ESP	Neco Celorio
16	MF	ESP	Ismael Álvarez
17	DF	ESP	Óscar Meza
18	MF	ESP	Tarsi Aguado
19	FW	ESP	Manín
20	DF	ESP	Alejandro Sotillos
21	FW	ESP	José Cambra
22	MF	ESP	Rubén Quintanilla
23	DF	ESP	Juan Durán
24	DF	GHA	Bema Sina
28	MF	ESP	Iñigo Ramos

=== Reserve team ===
Note: Flags indicate national team as defined under FIFA eligibility rules; some limited exceptions apply. Players may hold more than one non-FIFA nationality.

No.	Pos.	Nation	Player
26	FW	ESP	Manuel Ariza
27	MF	ESP	Guille Martín

No.	Pos.	Nation	Player
29	FW	ESP	Sandro Silva
32	GK	GEQ	Dylan Miguel

=== Current technical staff ===
Position	Staff
Manager	(Spain) Carlos Cura
Assistant manager	(Spain) Santiago Cortes
Fitness coach	(Spain) Luis Muñoz
Goalkeeping coach	(Spain) Alfonso Lacasa

Last updated: July 2018
Source: Rayo Majadahonda

== Notable players ==
Note: This list contains players that have played at least 100 league games and/or have reached international status.

- (Argentina) Lucas Mugni
- (France) Lucas Hernandez (youth)
- (France) Théo Hernandez (youth)
- (Spain) Marcos Llorente (youth)
- (Argentina) Giovanni Simeone (youth)
- (Spain) Asen
- (Spain) Dani García
- (Morocco) Munir (youth)
- (Spain) Rodri (youth)
- (Spain) Jorge de Frutos

== Notable coaches ==
- (Spain) Antonio Iriondo
- (Spain) Manolo

== Reserve team ==
Founded in 1997, Rayo Majadahonda's reserve team started playing in the Regional Preferente (fifth tier) from 2000 to 2010. It was dissolved in 2011, after a third position in the Primera Regional.

On 4 July 2018, the club reached an agreement with CDF Tres Cantos to become its reserve team. The deal ended in April 2020, when the club announced a link with Alcobendas Sport; the club was renamed CD Paracuellos Antamira.

In 2021, Rayo Majadahonda's B-team returned to an active status, but now as a second reserve team behind Paracuellos. On 30 May 2023, Rayo Majadahonda's affiliation with Paracuellos ended, with the club choosing CU Collado Villalba as their new reserve team.
