= Jin Yonghao =

Chinese footballer (born 2003)

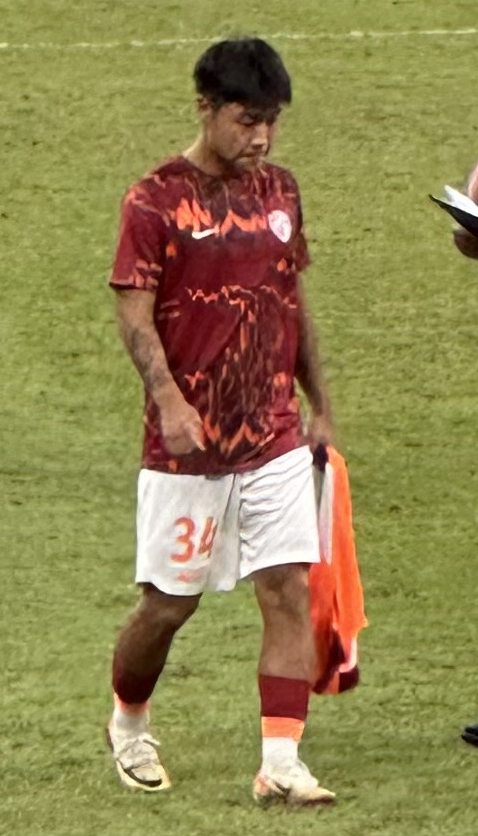
- Jin Yonghao in August 2024

Personal information
- Full name: Jin Yonghao
- Date of birth: 25 May 2003 (age 23)
- Place of birth: Yanbian, Jilin, China
- Height: 1.68 m (5 ft 6 in)
- Position: Left winger

Team information
- Current team: Qingdao Hainiu
- Number: 34

Youth career
- –2019: Yanbian Beiguo
- 2020: Yanbian Hailanjiang
- 2020–2021: Yanbian Sports School

Senior career*
Years	Team	Apps	(Gls)
2021–2023	Racing Rioja B	32	(7)
2021–2024	Racing Rioja	55	(4)
2024–	Qingdao Hainiu	61	(5)

International career
2026–	China U23	1	(0)
- * Club domestic league appearances and goals as of 22 November 2026

Jin Yonghao (Chinese: 金永浩; pinyin: Jīn Yǒnghào; Korean: 김영호; born 25 May 2003) is a Chinese professional footballer who plays as a left winger for Chinese Super League club Qingdao Hainiu.

== Club career ==
=== Racing Rioja ===
Born in Yanbian, Jilin, Jin Yonghao started playing football since third grade out of interest. After regularly watching Yanbian Funde matches, he decided to pursue football as a professional career. He played for the youth teams of Yanbian Beiguo, Yanbian Hailanjiang, and Yanbian Sports School until 2021. In July 2021, Jin Yonghao joined Spanish side Racing Rioja. While he predominantly featured in matches of the club's B team, he made his first start for the first team on 3 April 2022, in a Segunda Federación home match against Izarra. At the end of the 2021–22 season, he made a total of seven appearances for the first-team. For Racing Rioja B, he made sixteen appearances in the 2021–22 season, scoring five goals, and helped Racing Rioja B gain promotion to the 2022–23 Tercera Federación. In the 2022–23 Segunda Federación, Jin made eighteen league appearances, and one appearance in the Copa del Rey, and Racing Rioja were relegated to the Tercera Federación. While for the B team, he made sixteen appearances, scoring two goals. In the 2023–24 Tercera Federación, Jin made thirty league appearances, scoring four goals.

=== Qingdao Hainiu ===
On 12 July 2024, Jin joined Chinese Super League club Qingdao Hainiu on a free transfer, and was given the number 34. He made his debut for the club on 22 September 2024, in a 2–1 away league defeat against Nantong Zhiyun, coming on as a half-time substitute for Sha Yibo. He made three more appearances in the 2024 season.

On 20 April 2025, Jin scored his first goal for Qingdao Hainiu in a 3–1 away league defeat to Henan. On 1 May 2025, Jin provided an assist for Wellington Silva in a 1–1 away draw to Shandong Taishan. On 21 June 2025, Jin scored the opener in a 2–1 Chinese FA Cup home win against Guangxi Hengchen.

== International career ==
On 22 May 2025 and 1 July 2025, Jin was called up twice to train with the China U22 team.

== Personal life ==
Jin is of Korean Chinese ethnicity.

== Career statistics ==
=== Club ===
As of 22 November 2025

Appearances and goals by club, season, and competition
Club	Season	League			Cup (Note: Includes Copa del Rey, Chinese FA Cup)		Continental		Other		Total	
Club	Season	Division	Apps	Goals	Apps	Goals	Apps	Goals	Apps	Goals	Apps	Goals
Racing Rioja B	2021–22	Regional Preferente	16	5	–		–		–		16	5
Racing Rioja B	2022–23	Tercera Federación	16	2	–		–		–		16	2
Racing Rioja B	Total		32	7	0	0	0	0	0	0	32	7
Racing Rioja	2021–22	Segunda División RFEF	7	0	0	0	–		–		7	0
Racing Rioja	2022–23	Segunda Federación	18	0	1	0	–		–		19	0
Racing Rioja	2023–24	Tercera Federación	30	4	0	0	–		–		30	4
Racing Rioja	Total		55	4	1	0	0	0	0	0	56	4
Qingdao Hainiu	2024	Chinese Super League	4	0	0	0	–		–		4	0
Qingdao Hainiu	2025	Chinese Super League	29	1	3	1	–		–		32	2
Qingdao Hainiu	Total		33	1	3	1	0	0	0	0	36	2
Career total			120	12	4	1	0	0	0	0	124	13
