= Ge Wenjun =

Chinese footballer (born 2000)

Personal information
- Date of birth: 21 June 2000 (age 26)
- Place of birth: Nanjing, Jiangsu, China
- Position: Defender

Team information
- Current team: Gran Tarajal

Youth career
- Evergrande Football School
- 2016–2019: Shenzhen
- 2019–2020: Real Avilés

Senior career*
Years	Team	Apps	(Gls)
2021	Unión Puerto	5	(0)
2021–2023	Gran Tarajal	44	(0)
2024	Racing Rioja	10	(0)
2025	Villaverde	1	(0)
2025–	Moscardó	1	(0)
- * Club domestic league appearances and goals as of 17:14, 6 June 2026 (UTC)

Ge Wenjun (Chinese: 葛文军; born 21 June 2000), is a Chinese footballer who plays as a defender for Spanish side Moscardó. He also serves as club president of Gran Tarajal.

== Club career ==
=== Early career ===
Born in Nanjing, Jiangsu, Ge first developed an interest in football after watching the 2010 FIFA World Cup, and in his second year of junior high school, he enrolled at the Evergrande Football School. He joined the academy of professional side Shenzhen in 2016, staying until 2019, before he decided to move to Spain in pursuit of a football career.

=== Move to Spain ===
He moved to Avilés, joining local side Real Avilés at the age of nineteen, but only stayed a year before the COVID-19 pandemic in Spain forced him to return to China. He returned to Spain in April 2021, this time signing for Unión Puerto in the Canary Islands. After five appearances in the Tercera División, he moved to Gran Tarajal, who were competing at the same level.

In May 2022, with Gran Tarajal suffering the effects of the COVID-19 pandemic, as well as mismanagement by the former club chairman, Ge was contacted by the chairman to potentially succeed him at the club. After club elections on 19 May 2022, it was decided that Ge would become the new president of the club, at only 22 years of age.

After becoming president, Ge stated in an interview with Red Star News that he would look to "renew contracts, build a competitive team, and achieve our promotion goals" as well as "serve the local fans well and make them happy." He continues to play football, and aims to reach professional level in Spain or Japan.

== Career statistics ==
=== Club ===
As of 30 January 2023.

Appearances and goals by club, season and competition
Club	Season	League			Cup		Other		Total	
Club	Season	Division	Apps	Goals	Apps	Goals	Apps	Goals	Apps	Goals
Unión Puerto	2020–21	Tercera División	5	0	0	0	0	0	5	0
Gran Tarajal	2021–22	Tercera División RFEF	29	0	0	0	0	0	29	0
Gran Tarajal	2022–23	Tercera Federación	15	0	0	0	0	0	15	0
Gran Tarajal	Total		44	0	0	0	0	0	44	0
Racing Rioja	2023–24	Tercera Federación	10	0	0	0	0	0	10	0
Villaverde	2024–25	Tercera Federación	1	0	0	0	0	0	1	0
Moscardó	2025–26	Segunda Federación	1	0	0	0	0	0	1	0
Career total			61	0	0	0	0	0	61	0
