= CD Alesves =

Association football club in Spain

Alesves
- Full name: Club Deportivo Alesves
- Founded: 1922
- Ground: El Palomar, Villafranca, Navarre, Spain
- Capacity: 1,000
- President: Gabriel Virto
- Manager: David Cristóbal
- League: Regional Preferente – Group 2
- 2024–25: Primera Autonómica, 17th of 18 (relegated)
Home colours	Away colours

Club Deportivo Alesves is a Spanish football team based in Villafranca, in the autonomous community of Navarre. Founded in 1922, they play in Regional Preferente – Group 2, holding home games at Municipal El Palomar, with a capacity of 1,000 people.

== Honours ==
Founded in 1922, Alesves intended to join the newly-created Navarre Football Federation in 1928, but the economic demands from the federation led the club into a financial crisis in the following decades. In 1956, the club achieved a first-ever promotion to Tercera División, but after suffering immediate relegation in the last position, the club ceased activities.

Back in 1960, Alesves played four seasons before spending another five years without a senior team. In June 2018, the club returned to the fourth division after a 61-year absence.

== Season to season ==
Season	Tier	Division	Place	Copa del Rey
1929–30	6	3ª Reg.	1st	
1930–31	5	2ª Reg.	(R)	
1931–1943	DNP			
1943–44	5	2ª Reg.	3rd	
1944–45	5	2ª Reg.	1st	
1945–46	5	2ª Reg.	2nd	
1946–47	4	1ª Reg.	4th	
1947–48	4	1ª Reg.	4th	
1948–49	4	1ª Reg.	10th	
1949–50	4	1ª Reg.	6th	
1950–51	4	1ª Reg.	8th	
1951–52	4	1ª Reg.	11th	
1952–53	4	1ª Reg.	9th	
1953–54	4	1ª Reg.	12th	
1954–55	4	1ª Reg.	10th	
1955–56	4	1ª Reg.	4th	
1956–57	3	3ª	18th	
1957–58	DNP			
1958–59	DNP			
1959–60	DNP			

Season	Tier	Division	Place	Copa del Rey
1960–61	5	2ª Reg.	1st	
1961–62	4	1ª Reg.	9th	
1962–63	4	1ª Reg.	14th	
1963–64	4	1ª Reg.	14th	
1964–1969	DNP			
1969–70	5	2ª Reg.	1st	
1970–71	5	2ª Reg.	2nd	
1971–72	4	1ª Reg.	13th	
1972–73	4	1ª Reg.	7th	
1973–74	4	1ª Reg.	3rd	
1974–75	4	Reg. Pref.	12th	
1975–76	4	Reg. Pref.	11th	
1976–77	4	Reg. Pref.	17th	
1977–78	5	Reg. Pref.	16th	
1978–79	5	Reg. Pref.	20th	
1979–80	6	1ª Reg.	15th	
1980–81	7	2ª Reg.	1st	
1981–82	6	1ª Reg.	10th	
1982–83	6	1ª Reg.	16th	
1983–84	7	2ª Reg.	2nd	

Season	Tier	Division	Place	Copa del Rey
1984–85	6	1ª Reg.	10th	
1985–86	6	1ª Reg.	10th	
1986–87	6	1ª Reg.	10th	
1987–88	6	1ª Reg.	11th	
1988–89	DNP			
1989–90	6	1ª Reg.	13th	
1990–91	6	1ª Reg.	1st	
1991–92	5	Reg. Pref.	12th	
1992–93	5	Reg. Pref.	12th	
1993–94	5	Reg. Pref.	12th	
1994–95	5	Reg. Pref.	10th	
1995–96	5	Reg. Pref.	14th	
1996–97	5	Reg. Pref.	19th	
1997–98	6	1ª Reg.	5th	
1998–99	6	1ª Reg.	3rd	
1999–2000	6	1ª Reg.	9th	
2000–01	6	1ª Reg.	3rd	
2001–02	6	1ª Reg.	6th	
2002–03	6	1ª Reg.	9th	
2003–04	6	1ª Reg.	4th	

Season	Tier	Division	Place	Copa del Rey
2004–05	5	Reg. Pref.	12th	
2005–06	5	Reg. Pref.	15th	
2006–07	6	1ª Reg.	3rd	
2007–08	5	Reg. Pref.	14th	
2008–09	6	1ª Reg.	4th	
2009–10	6	1ª Reg.	3rd	
2010–11	5	Reg. Pref.	16th	
2011–12	6	1ª Reg.	8th	
2012–13	6	1ª Reg.	5th	
2013–14	6	1ª Reg.	2nd	
2014–15	6	1ª Reg.	5th	
2015–16	6	Reg. Pref.	1st	
2016–17	5	1ª Aut.	12th	
2017–18	5	1ª Aut.	3rd	
2018–19	4	3ª	20th	
2019–20	5	1ª Aut.	5th	
2020–21	5	1ª Aut.	6th	
2021–22	6	1ª Aut.	1st	
2022–23	5	3ª Fed.	15th	
2023–24	5	3ª Fed.	18th	

Season	Tier	Division	Place	Copa del Rey
2024–25	6	1ª Aut.	17th	
2025–26	7	Reg. Pref.		

- 2 seasons in Tercera División
- 2 seasons in Tercera Federación
