= 2022–23 Tercera Federación =

Tercera Federación
- Season: 2022–23
- Dates: 10 September 2022 – 4 June 2023

The 2022–23 Tercera Federación season was the second for Tercera Federación, the national fifth level in the Spanish football league system. It consisted of 18 groups with 16 teams each.

== Competition format ==
- The group champions were promoted to 2023–24 Segunda Federación.
- The champion of each group qualified for 2023–24 Copa del Rey. If the champion was a reserve team, the first non-reserve team qualified joined the Copa. In addition, the best seven non-reserve teams that did not win their group but finished in second position qualified for the Copa.
- Relegations to the regional leagues might have depended on which clubs are relegated in the 2022–23 Segunda Federación, as well as the number of the promoted teams for the ensuing season.

== Overview before the season ==
A total of 288 teams made up the league: 27 relegated from the 2021–22 Segunda División RFEF, 203 retained from the 2021–22 Tercera División RFEF, and 58 promoted from the regional divisions.

== Groups ==
=== Group 1 – Galicia ===
Location of teams of the 2022–23 Tercera Federación Group 1

Teams retained from 2021–22 Tercera División RFEF

- Alondras
- Arzúa
- Barco
- Choco
- Estradense
- Deportivo Fabril
- Racing Vilalbés
- Rápido Bouzas
- Silva
- Somozas
- Viveiro

Teams relegated from 2021–22 Segunda División RFEF

- Arosa

Teams promoted from 2021–22 Preferente de Galicia

- Atlético Arteixo
- Gran Peña
- Ourense
- Paiosaco

==== Teams and locations ====
Team	City	Home ground
Alondras	Cangas	O Morrazo
Arosa	Vilagarcía de Arousa	A Lomba
Arzúa	Arzúa	Do Viso
Atlético Arteixo	Arteixo	Ponte dos Brozos
Barco	O Barco de Valdeorras	Calabagueiros
Choco	Redondela	Santa Mariña
Deportivo Fabril	Abegondo	Abegondo
Estradense	A Estrada	Municipal
Gran Peña	Vigo	Barreiro
Ourense	Ourense	O Couto
Paiosaco	A Laracha	Porta Santa
Racing Villalbés	Vilalba	A Magdalena
Rápido de Bouzas	Vigo	Baltasar Pujales
Silva	A Coruña	A Grela
Somozas	As Somozas	Pardiñas
Viveiro	Viveiro	Cantarrana

==== League table ====
Pos	Team	Pld	W	D	L	GF	GA	GD	Pts	Qualification
1	Deportivo Fabril (C, P)	30	17	10	3	47	18	+29	61	Promotion to Segunda Federación
2	Arosa (Y)	30	16	10	4	45	26	+19	58	Qualification for the promotion play-offs and Copa del Rey
3	Rápido Bouzas	30	14	14	2	39	24	+15	56	Qualification for the promotion play-offs
4	Racing Villalbés (P)	30	11	13	6	35	24	+11	46	Qualification for the promotion play-offs
5	UD Ourense	30	11	12	7	38	30	+8	45	Qualification for the promotion play-offs
6	Alondras (Note: Alondras awarded a 0–3 win in their Round 29 match against Gran Peña after the latter fielded an ineligible player. The match originally ended 4–3.)	30	11	8	11	36	29	+7	41 (Note: Alondras finished ahead of Atlético Arteixo on head-to-head goal difference: Alondras–Atlético Arteixo 2–0, Atlético Arteixo–Alondras 1–0)	
7	Atlético Arteixo	30	11	8	11	37	42	−5	41	
8	Somozas	30	11	7	12	32	37	−5	40	
9	Estradense	30	11	6	13	33	38	−5	39	
10	Gran Peña	30	10	8	12	47	37	+10	38	
11	Paiosaco	30	11	4	15	31	42	−11	37 (Note: Paiosaco finished ahead of Silva and Viveiro on head-to-head points: Paiosaco 7 pts, Silva 5 pts, Viveiro 4 pts)	
12	Silva	30	10	7	13	38	46	−8	37	
13	Viveiro	30	9	10	11	29	37	−8	37	
14	Arzúa (Note: Due to the expansion of Tercera Federación to 18 teams starting in 2023–24 and the promotion of Racing Villalbés, Arzúa remained in the category.)	30	9	4	17	28	48	−20	31 (Note: Arzúa finished ahead of Barco on head-to-head points: Barco–Arzúa 0–1, Arzúa–Barco 0–0)	
15	Barco (R)	30	8	7	15	26	38	−12	31	Relegation to Preferente de Galicia
16	Choco (R)	30	3	6	21	27	52	−25	15	Relegation to Preferente de Galicia

Updated to match(es) played on 23 April 2023. Source:
Rules for classification: 1) points; 2) head-to-head points; 3) head-to-head goal difference; 4) goal difference; 5) number of goals scored
(C) Champions; (P) Promoted; (R) Relegated; (Y) Qualification to the Copa del Rey

=== Group 2 – Asturias ===
Teams retained from 2021–22 Tercera División RFEF

- Caudal
- Colunga
- Covadonga
- L'Entregu
- Lealtad
- Llanes
- Luarca
- Praviano
- Sporting Gijón B
- Titánico
- Tuilla

Teams relegated from 2021–22 Segunda División RFEF

- Ceares
- Llanera

Teams promoted from 2021–22 Regional Preferente

- Avilés Stadium
- Condal
- Valdesoto

==== Teams and locations ====
Location of the 2022–23 Tercera División RFEF Group 2

Team	City	Home ground
Avilés Stadium	Avilés	Muro de Zaro
Caudal	Mieres	Hermanos Antuña
Ceares	Gijón	La Cruz
Colunga	Colunga	Santianes
Condal	Noreña	Alejandro Ortea
Covadonga	Oviedo	Juan Antonio Álvarez Rabanal
L'Entregu	El Entrego, San Martín del Rey Aurelio	Nuevo Nalón
Lealtad	Villaviciosa	Les Caleyes
Llanera	Llanera	Pepe Quimarán
Llanes	Llanes	San José
Luarca	Luarca	La Veigona
Praviano	Pravia	Santa Catalina
Sporting Gijón B	Gijón	Pepe Ortiz
Titánico	Laviana	Las Tolvas
Tuilla	Tuilla, Langreo	El Candín
Valdesoto	Valdesoto, Siero	Villarrea

==== League table ====
Pos	Team	Pld	W	D	L	GF	GA	GD	Pts	Qualification
1	Covadonga (C, P, Y)	30	19	8	3	53	21	+32	65	Promotion to Segunda Federación and qualification for Copa del Rey
2	Sporting Gijón B	30	19	7	4	56	21	+35	64	Qualification for the promotion play-offs
3	L'Entregu	30	19	3	8	42	28	+14	60	Qualification for the promotion play-offs
4	Llanera	30	17	4	9	49	26	+23	55	Qualification for the promotion play-offs
5	Praviano	30	15	8	7	40	23	+17	53	Qualification for the promotion play-offs
6	Caudal	30	14	8	8	41	21	+20	50	
7	Lealtad	30	11	10	9	31	27	+4	43	
8	Llanes	30	11	7	12	36	40	−4	40	
9	Titánico	30	9	9	12	28	44	−16	36 (Note: Titánico finished ahead of Colunga and Llanes on head-to-head points: Titánico 8 pts, Colunga 7 pts, Tuilla 1 pt)	
10	Colunga	30	10	6	14	35	39	−4	36	
11	Tuilla	30	10	6	14	39	52	−13	36	
12	Ceares	30	9	7	14	35	44	−9	34	
13	Luarca	30	7	9	14	21	32	−11	30	
14	Condal (Note: Due to the expansion of Tercera Federación groups to 18 teams, Avilés Stadium and Condal remained in the category.)	30	5	10	15	20	42	−22	25	
15	Avilés Stadium	30	6	5	19	25	52	−27	23	
16	Valdesoto (R)	30	3	5	22	22	61	−39	14	Relegation to Regional Preferente

Updated to match(es) played on 23 April 2023. Source:
Rules for classification: 1) points; 2) head-to-head points; 3) head-to-head goal difference; 4) goal difference; 5) number of goals scored
(C) Champions; (P) Promoted; (R) Relegated; (Y) Qualification to the Copa del Rey

=== Group 3 – Cantabria ===
Teams retained from 2021–22 Tercera División RFEF

- Atlético Albericia
- Cartes
- Castro
- Escobedo
- Guarnizo
- Naval
- Sámano
- Siete Villas
- Textil Escudo
- Torina
- Vimenor

Teams relegated from 2021–22 Segunda División RFEF

- Cayón
- Tropezón

Teams promoted from 2021–22 Regional Preferente

- Gama
- Revilla
- Solares-Medio Cudeyo

==== Teams and locations ====
Location of teams of the 2022–23 Tercera Federación Group 3

Team	City	Home ground
Atlético Albericia	Santander	Juan Hormaechea
Cartes	Cartes	El Ansar
Castro	Castro Urdiales	Mioño
Cayón	Sarón, Santa María de Cayón	Fernando Astobiza
Escobedo	Escobedo, Camargo	Eusebio Arce
Gama	Bárcena de Cicero	Santa María
Guarnizo	Guarnizo, El Astillero	El Pilar
Naval	Reinosa	San Francisco
Revilla	Revilla, Camargo	El Crucero
Sámano	Sámano, Castro Urdiales	Vallegón
Siete Villas	Castillo Siete Villas, Arnuero	San Pedro
Solares-Medio Cudeyo	Solares, Medio Cudeyo	La Estación
Textil Escudo	Cabezón de la Sal	Municipal
Torina	Bárcena de Pie de Concha	Municipal
Tropezón	Tanos, Torrelavega	Santa Ana
Vimenor	Vioño de Piélagos, Piélagos	La Vidriera

==== League table ====
Pos	Team	Pld	W	D	L	GF	GA	GD	Pts	Qualification
1	Cayón (C, P, Y)	30	16	11	3	59	26	+33	59	Promotion to Segunda Federación and qualification for Copa del Rey
2	Vimenor	30	16	9	5	52	36	+16	57	Qualification for the promotion play-offs
3	Tropezón	30	13	13	4	46	23	+23	52 (Note: Tropezón finished ahead of Escobedo and Atlético Albericia on head-to-head points: Tropezón 6 pts, Escobedo 5 pts, Atlético Albericia 3 pts)	Qualification for the promotion play-offs
4	Escobedo	30	16	4	10	50	34	+16	52	Qualification for the promotion play-offs
5	Atlético Albericia	30	13	13	4	53	34	+19	52	Qualification for the promotion play-offs
6	Torina	30	14	7	9	34	20	+14	49	
7	Naval	30	12	7	11	26	27	−1	43	
8	Siete Villas	30	11	8	11	34	37	−3	41	
9	Sámano	30	9	13	8	39	43	−4	40	
10	Revilla	30	8	9	13	37	44	−7	33	
11	Guarnizo	30	7	10	13	27	35	−8	31 (Note: Guarnizo finished ahead of Cartes on overall goal difference)	
12	Cartes	30	8	7	15	26	46	−20	31	
13	Castro	30	6	12	12	33	43	−10	30	
14	Solares-Medio Cudeyo (Note: Due to the expansion of Tercera Federación groups to 18 teams, Solares-Medio Cudeyo stayed in the category.)	30	7	7	16	34	49	−15	28	
15	Gama (R)	30	6	8	16	30	58	−28	26	Relegation to Regional Preferente
16	Textil Escudo (R)	30	6	6	18	26	51	−25	24	Relegation to Regional Preferente

Updated to match(es) played on 22 April 2023. Source:
Rules for classification: 1) points; 2) head-to-head points; 3) head-to-head goal difference; 4) goal difference; 5) number of goals scored
(C) Champions; (P) Promoted; (R) Relegated; (Y) Qualification to the Copa del Rey

=== Group 4 – Basque Country ===
Teams retained from 2021–22 Tercera División RFEF

- Anaitasuna
- Aurrerá Ondarroa
- Barakaldo
- Basconia
- Cultural Durango
- Deusto
- Lagun Onak
- Leioa
- Pasaia
- Portugalete
- San Ignacio
- Urduliz
- Vitoria

Teams promoted from 2021–22 División de Honor

- Aurrerá Vitoria
- Padura
- Touring

==== Teams and locations ====
Location of teams of the 2022–23 Tercera Federación Group 4

Team	City	Home ground
Anaitasuna	Azkoitia	Txerloia
Aurrerá Ondarroa	Ondarroa	Zaldupe
Aurrerá Vitoria	Vitoria-Gasteiz	Olaranbe
Barakaldo	Barakaldo	Lasesarre
Basconia	Basauri	López Cortázar
Cultural Durango	Durango	Tabira
Deusto	Bilbao	Etxezuri
Lagun Onak	Azpeitia	Garmendipe
Leioa	Leioa	Sarriena
Padura	Arrigorriaga	Santo Cristo
Pasaia	Pasaia	Don Bosco
Portugalete	Portugalete	La Florida
San Ignacio	Vitoria-Gasteiz	Adurtzabal
Touring	Errenteria	Fandería
Urduliz	Urduliz	Iparralde
Vitoria	Laudio	Ellakuri

==== League table ====
Pos	Team	Pld	W	D	L	GF	GA	GD	Pts	Qualification
1	Barakaldo (C, P, Y)	30	23	7	0	67	11	+56	76	Promotion to Segunda Federación and qualification for Copa del Rey
2	Vitoria	30	16	10	4	49	18	+31	58	Qualification for the promotion play-offs
3	Leioa	30	17	5	8	49	36	+13	56	Qualification for the promotion play-offs
4	Basconia	30	15	9	6	59	37	+22	54	Qualification for the promotion play-offs
5	Deusto	30	11	14	5	38	26	+12	47	Qualification for the promotion play-offs
6	Portugalete	30	11	8	11	32	32	0	41	
7	Pasaia	30	11	5	14	36	53	−17	38	
8	Cultural Durango	30	10	7	13	40	41	−1	37 (Note: Cultural Durango finished ahead of Aurrerá Ondarroa and Anaitasuna on head-to-head points: Cultural Durango 7 pts, Aurrerá Ondarroa 5 pts, Anaitasuna 3 pts)	
9	Aurrerá Ondarroa	30	9	10	11	29	37	−8	37	
10	Anaitasuna	30	9	10	11	36	36	0	37	
11	Urduliz	30	7	12	11	31	38	−7	33 (Note: Urduliz finished ahead of Lagun Onak on head-to-head points; Urduliz–Lagun Onak 1–0, Lagun Onak–Urduliz 0–1)	
12	Lagun Onak	30	7	12	11	25	29	−4	33	
13	Padura	30	7	11	12	28	39	−11	32 (Note: Padura finished ahead of Touring on head-to-head goal difference: Padura–Touring 3–1, Touring–Padura 2–1)	
14	Touring (Note: Due to the expansion of Tercera Federación to 18 teams per group, Touring and San Ignacio remained in the category)	30	8	8	14	34	52	−18	32	
15	San Ignacio	30	6	8	16	30	53	−23	26	
16	Aurrerá Vitoria (R)	30	2	6	22	17	62	−45	12	Relegation to División de Honor

Updated to match(es) played on 22 April 2023. Source:
Rules for classification: 1) points; 2) head-to-head points; 3) head-to-head goal difference; 4) goal difference; 5) number of goals scored
(C) Champions; (P) Promoted; (R) Relegated; (Y) Qualification to the Copa del Rey

=== Group 5 – Catalonia ===
Location of teams of the 2022–23 Tercera Federación Group 5
Location of teams of the 2022–23 Tercera Federación Group 5 (Province of Barcelona)

Teams retained from 2021–22 Tercera División RFEF

- Castelldefels
- Girona B
- Grama
- L'Hospitalet
- Pobla Mafumet
- Peralada
- San Cristóbal
- Sant Andreu
- Sants (Note: After Talavera de la Reina took Internacional de Madrid's spot in the 2022–23 Primera Federación, their 2022–23 Segunda Federación spot was vacant, with Cerdanyola del Vallès taking their place on 2 September 2022. Sants benefitted from Cerdanyola's promotion and were kept in Tercera Federación.)
- Vilafranca
- Vilassar de Mar

Teams relegated from 2021–22 Segunda División RFEF

- Badalona
- Europa

Teams promoted from 2021–22 Primera Catalana

- Montañesa
- Rapitenca
- Tona

==== Teams and locations ====
Team	City	Home ground
Badalona	Badalona	Municipal de Badalona
Castelldefels	Castelldefels	Els Canyars
Europa	Barcelona	Nou Sardenya
Girona B	Girona	Torres de Palau
Grama	Santa Coloma de Gramenet	Can Peixauet
L'Hospitalet	L'Hospitalet de Llobregat	Municipal de l'Hospitalet de Llobregat
Montañesa	Barcelona	Nou Barris
Peralada	Peralada	Municipal de Peralada
Pobla de Mafumet	La Pobla de Mafumet	Municipal de la Pobla de Mafumet
Rapitenca	Sant Carles de la Ràpita	La Devesa
San Cristóbal	Terrassa	Ca n'Anglada
Sant Andreu	Barcelona	Narcís Sala
Sants	Barcelona	L'Energia
Tona	Tona	Municipal
Vilafranca	Vilafranca del Penedès	ZEM de Vilafranca del Penedès
Vilassar de Mar	Vilassar de Mar	Xevi Ramón

==== League table ====
Pos	Team	Pld	W	D	L	GF	GA	GD	Pts	Qualification
1	Europa (C, P, Y)	30	18	6	6	42	21	+21	60	Promotion to Segunda Federación and qualification for Copa del Rey
2	Sant Andreu (P)	30	15	11	4	50	31	+19	56	Qualification for the promotion play-offs
3	San Cristóbal	30	14	10	6	36	21	+15	52	Qualification for the promotion play-offs
4	L'Hospitalet	30	15	6	9	53	33	+20	51	Qualification for the promotion play-offs
5	Peralada	30	14	7	9	41	33	+8	49	Qualification for the promotion play-offs
6	Castelldefels	30	13	5	12	31	35	−4	44	
7	Pobla de Mafumet	30	12	7	11	40	35	+5	43 (Note: Pobla de Mafumet finished ahead of Girona B on head-to-head points: Pobla de Mafumet–Girona B 1–0, Girona B–Pobla de Mafumet 1–1)	
8	Girona B	30	12	7	11	45	34	+11	43	
9	Montañesa	30	10	10	10	38	38	0	40	
10	Grama	30	9	10	11	38	46	−8	37	
11	Tona	30	8	9	13	36	51	−15	33	
12	Rapitenca	30	8	8	14	37	48	−11	32	
13	Badalona	30	7	10	13	32	35	−3	31	
14	Vilafranca (Note: Due to the expansion of Tercera Federación to 18 teams and the promotion of Sant Andreu, both Vilafranca and Vilassar de Mar remained in the category)	30	7	9	14	38	55	−17	30	
15	Vilassar de Mar	30	6	10	14	33	47	−14	28	
16	Sants (R)	30	5	9	16	29	56	−27	24	Relegation to Lliga Elit

Updated to match(es) played on 23 April 2023. Source:
Rules for classification: 1) points; 2) head-to-head points; 3) head-to-head goal difference; 4) goal difference; 5) number of goals scored
(C) Champions; (P) Promoted; (R) Relegated; (Y) Qualification to the Copa del Rey

=== Group 6 – Valencian Community ===
Location of teams of the 2022–23 Tercera Federación Group 6

Teams retained from 2021–22 Tercera División RFEF

- Acero
- Athletic Torrellano
- Atzeneta
- Castellón B
- Elche Ilicitano
- Hércules B
- Jove Español
- Orihuela
- Roda
- Silla
- Torrent
- Villarreal C

Teams relegated from 2021–22 Segunda División RFEF

- Atlético Levante

Teams promoted from 2021–22 Regional Preferente

- Gandía
- Patacona
- Rayo Ibense

==== Teams and locations ====
Team	City	Home ground
Acero	Sagunto	El Fornàs
Athletic Torrellano	Torrellano, Elche	Municipal
Atlético Levante	Valencia	Ciudad Deportiva de Buñol
Atzeneta	Atzeneta d'Albaida	El Regit
Castellón B	Castellón	Ciudad Deportiva
Elche Ilicitano	Elche	José Díaz Iborra
Gandía	Gandía	Guillermo Olagüe
Hércules B	Alicante	Juan Antonio Samaranch
Jove Español	San Vicente del Raspeig	Ciudad Deportiva
Orihuela	Orihuela	Los Arcos
Patacona	Alboraya	Municipal
Rayo Ibense	Ibi	Francisco Vilaplana Mariel
Roda	Villarreal	Pamesa Cerámica
Silla	Silla	Vicente Morera
Torrent	Torrent	San Gregorio
Villarreal C	Villarreal	Pamesa Cerámica

==== League table ====
Pos	Team	Pld	W	D	L	GF	GA	GD	Pts	Qualification
1	Orihuela (C, P, Y)	30	19	3	8	44	22	+22	60	Promotion to Segunda Federación and qualification for Copa del Rey
2	Atzeneta (Y)	30	15	13	2	46	23	+23	58	Qualification for the promotion play-offs and Copa del Rey
3	Torrent (P)	30	15	6	9	39	25	+14	51 (Note: Torrent finished ahead of Atlético Levante on head-to-head points: Atlético Levante–Torrent 0–1, Torrent–Atlético Levante 2–1)	Qualification for the promotion play-offs
4	Atlético Levante	30	13	12	5	29	17	+12	51	Qualification for the promotion play-offs
5	Roda	30	12	10	8	29	23	+6	46	Qualification for the promotion play-offs
6	Gandía	30	12	9	9	31	27	+4	45	
7	Athletic Torrellano	30	11	7	12	29	36	−7	40	
8	Villarreal C	30	11	6	13	33	37	−4	39	
9	Patacona	30	10	8	12	28	27	+1	38	
10	Castellón B	30	8	10	12	29	37	−8	34 (Note: Castellón B finished ahead of Elche Ilicitano on head-to-head goal difference: Elche Ilicitano–Castellón B 2–1, Castellón B–Elche Ilicitano 2–0)	
11	Elche Ilicitano	30	8	10	12	24	29	−5	34	
12	Acero	30	8	9	13	26	35	−9	33 (Note: Acero finished ahead of Rayo Ibense on head-to-head goal difference: Rayo Ibense–Acero 2–1, Acero–Rayo Ibense 2–0)	
13	Rayo Ibense	30	9	6	15	34	48	−14	33	
14	Jove Español (Note: Due to the expansion of Tercera Federación to 18 teams and the promotion of Torrent, both Jove Español and Silla remained in the category)	30	7	11	12	20	27	−7	32	
15	Silla	30	7	9	14	25	40	−15	30	
16	Hércules B (R)	30	7	7	16	32	45	−13	28	Relegation to Regional Preferente

Updated to match(es) played on 23 April 2023. Source:
Rules for classification: 1) points; 2) head-to-head points; 3) head-to-head goal difference; 4) goal difference; 5) number of goals scored
(C) Champions; (P) Promoted; (R) Relegated; (Y) Qualification to the Copa del Rey

=== Group 7 – Community of Madrid ===
Location of teams of the 2022–23 Tercera Federación Group 7

Teams retained from 2021–22 Tercera División RFEF

- Alcalá
- Fuenlabrada Promesas
- Galapagar
- Getafe B
- Las Rozas
- Paracuellos Antamira
- Pozuelo de Alarcón
- Rayo Vallecano B
- Torrejón
- Trival Valderas
- Ursaria

Teams relegated from 2021–22 Segunda División RFEF

- Móstoles URJC

Teams promoted from 2021–22 Preferente de Madrid

- Canillas
- Collado Villalba
- Real Aranjuez
- RSC Internacional

==== Teams and locations ====
Team	City	Home ground
Alcalá	Alcalá de Henares	Municipal del Val
Canillas	Madrid	Canillas
Collado Villalba	Collado Villalba	Ciudad Deportiva
Fuenlabrada Promesas	Fuenlabrada	La Aldehuela
Galapagar	Galapagar	El Chopo
Getafe B	Getafe	Ciudad Deportiva
Las Rozas	Las Rozas	Dehesa de Navalcarbón
Móstoles URJC	Móstoles	El Soto
Paracuellos Antamira	Majadahonda	La Oliva
Pozuelo de Alarcón	Pozuelo de Alarcón	Valle de las Cañas
Rayo Vallecano B	Madrid	Ciudad Deportiva
Real Aranjuez	Aranjuez	El Deleite
RSC Internacional	Madrid	Ciudad Real Madrid
Torrejón	Torrejón de Ardoz	Las Veredillas
Trival Valderas	Alcorcón	La Canaleja
Ursaria	Cobeña	Municipal La Dehesa

==== League table ====
Pos	Team	Pld	W	D	L	GF	GA	GD	Pts	Qualification
1	Ursaria (C, P, Y)	30	20	8	2	62	22	+40	68	Promotion to Segunda Federación and qualification for Copa del Rey
2	RSC Internacional	30	21	4	5	73	27	+46	67	Qualification for the promotion play-offs
3	Getafe B (P)	30	15	9	6	49	24	+25	54	Qualification for the promotion play-offs
4	Paracuellos Antamira	30	14	6	10	48	40	+8	48	Qualification for the promotion play-offs
5	Móstoles URJC	30	14	5	11	38	32	+6	47	Qualification for the promotion play-offs
6	Alcalá	30	12	10	8	31	28	+3	46	
7	Las Rozas	30	13	6	11	37	38	−1	45	
8	Trival Valderas	30	11	4	15	38	44	−6	37 (Note: Trival Valderas finished ahead of Pozuelo de Alarcón on overall goal difference)	
9	Pozuelo de Alarcón	30	9	10	11	37	47	−10	37	
10	Torrejón	30	9	8	13	31	42	−11	35 (Note: Torrejón finished ahead of Galapagar on head-to-head points: Torrejón–Galapagar 3–2, Galapagar–Torrejón 0–2)	
11	Galapagar	30	10	5	15	38	44	−6	35	
12	Collado Villalba	30	9	7	14	30	45	−15	34 (Note: Collado Villalba finished ahead of Canillas on head-to-head points: Canillas–Collado Villalba 0–1, Collado Villalba–Canillas 2–1)	
13	Canillas	30	9	7	14	34	46	−12	34	
14	Rayo Vallecano B (Note: Due to the expansion of Tercera Federación to 18 teams and the promotion of Getafe B, Rayo Vallecano B remained in the category)	30	9	6	15	42	45	−3	33	
15	Fuenlabrada Promesas (R)	30	9	5	16	31	52	−21	32	Relegation to Preferente de Madrid
16	Real Aranjuez (R)	30	4	4	22	21	64	−43	16	Relegation to Preferente de Madrid

Updated to match(es) played on 23 April 2023. Source:
Rules for classification: 1) points; 2) head-to-head points; 3) head-to-head goal difference; 4) goal difference; 5) number of goals scored
(C) Champions; (P) Promoted; (R) Relegated; (Y) Qualification to the Copa del Rey

=== Group 8 – Castile and León ===
Teams retained from 2021–22 Tercera División RFEF

- Almazán
- Arandina
- Atlético Astorga
- Atlético Bembibre
- Atlético Tordesillas
- Ávila
- Júpiter Leonés
- La Virgen del Camino
- Mirandés B
- Numancia B
- Palencia
- Santa Marta

Teams relegated from 2021–22 Segunda División RFEF

- Salamanca

Teams promoted from 2021–22 Primera Regional

- Becerril
- Ponferradina B
- Unami

==== Teams and locations ====
Location of teams of the 2022–23 Tercera Federación Group 8

Team	City	Home ground
Almazán	Almazán	La Arboleda
Arandina	Aranda de Duero	El Montecillo
Atlético Astorga	Astorga	La Eragudina
Atlético Bembibre	Bembibre	La Devesa
Atlético Tordesillas	Tordesillas	Las Salinas
Ávila	Ávila	Adolfo Suárez
Becerril	Becerril de Campos	Mariano Haro
Júpiter Leonés	León	Puente Castro
La Virgen del Camino	La Virgen del Camino, Valverde de la Virgen	Los Dominicos
Mirandés B	Miranda de Ebro	Ence
Numancia B	Soria	Francisco Rubio
Palencia	Palencia	Nueva Balastera
Ponferradina B	Ponferrada	Compostilla
Salamanca	Salamanca	Helmántico
Santa Marta	Santa Marta de Tormes	Alfonso San Casto
Unami	Segovia	La Albuera

==== League table ====
Pos	Team	Pld	W	D	L	GF	GA	GD	Pts	Qualification
1	Arandina (C, P, Y)	30	19	11	0	55	18	+37	68	Promotion to Segunda Federación and qualification for Copa del Rey
2	Atlético Astorga (Y)	30	18	7	5	54	27	+27	61	Qualification for the promotion play-offs and Copa del Rey
3	Salamanca	30	16	5	9	38	26	+12	53	Qualification for the promotion play-offs
4	Ávila	30	13	11	6	40	26	+14	50 (Note: Ávila finished ahead of Atlético Tordesillas on head-to-head goal difference: Ávila–Atlético Tordesillas 2–0, Atlético Tordesillas–Ávila 2–1)	Qualification for the promotion play-offs
5	Atlético Tordesillas	30	14	8	8	30	24	+6	50	Qualification for the promotion play-offs
6	Almazán	30	13	8	9	36	32	+4	47	
7	La Virgen del Camino	30	13	6	11	36	33	+3	45	
8	Ponferradina B	30	10	9	11	37	32	+5	39	
9	Mirandés B	30	10	8	12	41	38	+3	38	
10	Atlético Bembibre	30	9	8	13	35	40	−5	35 (Note: Atlético Bembibre finished ahead of Becerril on head-to-head points: Becerril–Atlético Bembibre 0–1, Atlético Bembibre–Becerril 7–3)	
11	Becerril	30	10	5	15	34	46	−12	35	
12	Palencia	30	10	4	16	42	42	0	34	
13	Júpiter Leonés	30	8	9	13	22	33	−11	33	
14	Santa Marta (Note: Due to the expansion of Tercera Federación to 18 teams Santa Marta remained in the category)	30	7	7	16	31	59	−28	28	
15	Unami (R)	30	6	6	18	20	52	−32	24	Relegation to Primera Regional
16	Numancia B (R)	30	4	8	18	28	51	−23	20	Relegation to Primera Regional

Updated to match(es) played on 23 April 2023. Source:
Rules for classification: 1) points; 2) head-to-head points; 3) head-to-head goal difference; 4) goal difference; 5) number of goals scored
(C) Champions; (P) Promoted; (R) Relegated; (Y) Qualification to the Copa del Rey

=== Group 9 – Eastern Andalusia and Melilla ===
Teams retained from 2021–22 Tercera División RFEF

- Almería B
- Atlético Malagueño
- Atlético Porcuna
- Ciudad de Torredonjimeno
- El Palo
- Huétor Tájar
- Huétor Vega
- Jaén
- Marbella
- Motril
- Torre del Mar
- Torreperogil

Teams promoted from 2021–22 División de Honor

- Arenas
- Málaga City
- Maracena (Note: After Extremadura's spot in the 2022–23 Segunda Federación was vacant, Estepona took their place on 20 August 2022. Maracena benefitted from Estepona's promotion and was also promoted to Tercera Federación.)

Teams promoted from 2021–22 Primera Autonómica de Melilla

- Huracán Melilla

==== Teams and locations ====
Location of teams of the 2022–23 Tercera Federación Group 9
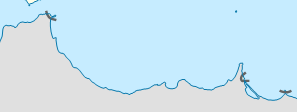
Location of teams of the 2022–23 Tercera Federación Group 9 – Melilla

Team	City	Home ground
Almería B	Almería	Estadio de los Juegos Mediterráneos
Arenas	Armilla	Municipal
Atlético Malagueño	Málaga	El Viso
Atlético Porcuna	Porcuna	San Benito
Ciudad de Torredonjimeno	Torredonjimeno	Matías Prats
El Palo	Málaga	San Ignacio
Huétor Tájar	Huétor-Tájar	Miguel Moranto
Huétor Vega	Huétor Vega	Las Viñas
Huracán Melilla	Melilla	La Espiguera
Jaén	Jaén	La Victoria
Málaga City	Nerja	Pepe Luis Boadilla
Maracena	Maracena	Ciudad Deportiva
Marbella	Marbella	Municipal de Marbella
Motril	Motril	Escribano Castilla
Torre del Mar	Torre del Mar	Juan Manuel Azuaga
Torreperogil	Torreperogil	Abdón Martínez Fariñas

==== League table ====
Pos	Team	Pld	W	D	L	GF	GA	GD	Pts	Qualification
1	Marbella (C, P, Y)	30	23	3	4	67	17	+50	72	Promotion to Segunda Federación and qualification for Copa del Rey
2	Jaén (Y)	30	21	5	4	58	12	+46	68	Qualification for the promotion play-offs and Copa del Rey
3	El Palo (P)	30	19	6	5	43	20	+23	63	Qualification for the promotion play-offs
4	Torre del Mar	30	17	4	9	53	31	+22	55	Qualification for the promotion play-offs
5	Atlético Malagueño	30	11	12	7	45	26	+19	45 (Note: Atlético Malagueño finished ahead of Huétor Vega on head-to-head points: Atlético Malagueño–Huétor Vega 1–1, Huétor Vega–Atlético Malagueño 0–1)	Qualification for the promotion play-offs
6	Huétor Vega	30	11	12	7	42	35	+7	45	
7	Motril	30	12	5	13	37	41	−4	41 (Note: Motril and Ciudad de Torredonjimeno finished ahead of Almería B on head-to-head points: Motril 7 pts, Ciudad de Torredonjimeno 7 pts, Almería B 2 pts. Motril finished ahead of Ciudad de Torredonjimeno on head-to-head goal difference: Ciudad de Torredonjimeno–Motril 1–0, Motril–Ciudad de Torredonjimeno 3–1)	
8	Ciudad de Torredonjimeno	30	11	8	11	45	42	+3	41	
9	Almeria B	30	12	5	13	40	34	+6	41	
10	Arenas	30	11	6	13	36	36	0	39	
11	Torreperogil	30	10	8	12	40	45	−5	38	
12	Huétor Tájar	30	10	7	13	52	44	+8	37	
13	Maracena	30	8	9	13	34	48	−14	33	
14	Málaga City (Note: Due to the expansion of Tercera Federación to 18 teams and the promotion of El Palo, FC Málaga City remained in the category)	30	6	7	17	22	48	−26	25	
15	Atlético Porcuna (R)	30	6	3	21	30	54	−24	21	Relegation to División de Honor
16	Huracán Melilla (R)	30	1	2	27	8	119	−111	5	Relegation to División de Honor

Updated to match(es) played on 23 April 2023. Source:
Rules for classification: 1) points; 2) head-to-head points; 3) head-to-head goal difference; 4) goal difference; 5) number of goals scored
(C) Champions; (P) Promoted; (R) Relegated; (Y) Qualification to the Copa del Rey

=== Group 10 – Western Andalusia and Ceuta ===
Teams retained from 2021–22 Tercera División RFEF

- Atlético Antoniano
- Cartaya
- Ceuta B
- Ciudad de Lucena
- Conil
- Córdoba B
- Gerena
- Pozoblanco
- Puente Genil
- Rota
- Sevilla C
- Xerez

Teams promoted from 2021–22 División de Honor

- Atlético Espeleño
- Ayamonte
- Bollullos
- Coria

==== Teams and locations ====
Location of teams of the 2022–23 Tercera Federación Group 10

Team	City	Home ground
Atlético Antoniano	Lebrija	Municipal
Atlético Espeleño	Espiel	Municipal
Ayamonte	Ayamonte	Ciudad de Ayamonte
Bollullos	Bollullos Par del Condado	Eloy Ávila Cano
Cartaya	Cartaya	Luis Rodríguez Salvador
Ceuta B	Ceuta	Alfonso Murube
Ciudad de Lucena	Lucena	Ciudad de Lucena
Conil	Conil de la Frontera	José Antonio Pérez Ureba
Córdoba B	Córdoba	Rafael Gómez
Coria	Coria del Río	Guadalquivir
Gerena	Gerena	José Juan Romero Gil
Pozoblanco	Pozoblanco	Municipal
Puente Genil	Puente Genil	Manuel Polinario
Rota	Rota	Alcalde Navarro Flores
Sevilla C	Seville	José Ramón Cisneros Palacios
Xerez	Jerez de la Frontera	La Juventud

==== League table ====
Pos	Team	Pld	W	D	L	GF	GA	GD	Pts	Qualification
1	Atlético Antoniano (C, P, Y)	30	17	9	4	47	24	+23	60	Promotion to Segunda Federación and qualification for Copa del Rey
2	Córdoba B	30	15	13	2	44	19	+25	58	Qualification for the promotion play-offs
3	Gerena	30	15	9	6	48	25	+23	54	Qualification for the promotion play-offs
4	Sevilla C (Note: Sevilla C was ineligible to participate in the promotion playoffs, as Sevilla Atlético is currently in Segunda Federación)	30	14	7	9	35	26	+9	49	
5	Puente Genil	30	13	8	9	42	35	+7	47 (Note: Puente Genil finished ahead of Ciudad de Lucena on head-to-head points: Ciudad de Lucena–Puente Genil 0–1, Puente Genil–Ciudad de Lucena 1–0)	Qualification for the promotion play-offs
6	Ciudad de Lucena	30	13	8	9	32	23	+9	47	Qualification for the promotion play-offs
7	Xerez	30	10	11	9	36	29	+7	41	
8	Atlético Espeleño	30	11	7	12	40	40	0	40 (Note: Atlético Espeleño and Conil finished ahead of Pozoblanco on head-to-head points: Atlético Espeleño 7 pts, Conil 7 pts, Pozoblanco 3 pts. Atlético Espeleño finished ahead of Conil on head-to-head points: Conil–Atlético Espeleño 0–0, Atlético Espeleño–Conil 5–2)	
9	Conil	30	10	10	10	32	31	+1	40	
10	Pozoblanco	30	11	7	12	29	37	−8	40	
11	Ceuta B	30	11	6	13	25	29	−4	39	
12	Bollullos	30	10	6	14	31	43	−12	36	
13	Ayamonte	30	9	6	15	31	43	−12	33	
14	Cartaya (Note: Due to the expansion of Tercera Federación to 18 teams both Cartaya and Coria remained in the category)	30	6	11	13	30	46	−16	29	
15	Coria	30	6	6	18	26	40	−14	24	
16	Rota (R)	30	5	4	21	15	53	−38	19	Relegation to División de Honor

Updated to match(es) played on 23 April 2023. Source:
Rules for classification: 1) points; 2) head-to-head points; 3) head-to-head goal difference; 4) goal difference; 5) number of goals scored
(C) Champions; (P) Promoted; (R) Relegated; (Y) Qualification to the Copa del Rey

=== Group 11 – Balearic Islands ===
Teams retained from 2021–22 Tercera División RFEF

- Binissalem
- Collerense
- Constància
- Llosetense
- Manacor
- Mercadal
- Platges de Calvià
- Poblense
- Portmany
- PE Sant Jordi
- Santanyí
- Sóller

Teams relegated from 2021–22 Segunda División RFEF

- Andratx

Teams promoted from 2021–22 Regional

- Inter Manacor
- Penya Independent
- CD Sant Jordi

==== Teams and locations ====
Location of teams of the 2022–23 Tercera Federación Group 11

Team	City	Home ground
Andratx	Andratx	Sa Plana
Binissalem	Binissalem	Miquel Pons
Collerense	Es Coll d'en Rabassa, Palma	Ca Na Paulina
Constància	Inca	Municipal
Inter Manacor	Manacor	Na Capellera
Llosetense	Lloseta	Municipal
Manacor	Manacor	Na Capellera
Mercadal	Es Mercadal	San Martí
Penya Independent	Sant Miquel de Balansat	Municipal
Platges de Calvià	Magaluf, Calvià	Municipal de Magaluf
Poblense	Sa Pobla	Nou Camp
Portmany	Sant Antoni de Portmany	Sant Antoni
CD Sant Jordi	Sant Jordi, Palma	Municipal
PE Sant Jordi	Sant Jordi de ses Salines, Sant Josep de sa Talaia	Kiko Serra
Santanyí	Santanyí	Municipal
Sóller	Sóller	En Maiol

==== League table ====
Pos	Team	Pld	W	D	L	GF	GA	GD	Pts	Qualification
1	Andratx (C, P, Y)	30	18	6	6	67	20	+47	60 (Note: Andratx finished ahead of Manacor on head-to-head points: Andratx–Manacor 1–0, Manacor–Andratx 0–4)	Promotion to Segunda Federación and qualification for Copa del Rey
2	Manacor (Y)	30	17	9	4	51	26	+25	60	Qualification for the promotion play-offs and Copa del Rey
3	Penya Independent (P)	30	17	8	5	51	23	+28	59	Qualification for the promotion play-offs
4	Poblense	30	15	11	4	58	25	+33	56	Qualification for the promotion play-offs
5	Santanyí	30	15	7	8	40	32	+8	52	Qualification for the promotion play-offs
6	Constància	30	12	12	6	47	33	+14	48	
7	Llosetense	30	13	8	9	41	34	+7	47	
8	Platges de Calvià	30	13	7	10	35	30	+5	46	
9	Mercadal	30	12	4	14	33	33	0	40	
10	Portmany	30	10	9	11	32	35	−3	39	
11	Binissalem	30	9	10	11	33	45	−12	37	
12	Collerense	30	7	12	11	33	44	−11	33	
13	Inter Manacor	30	8	5	17	29	50	−21	29	
14	PE Sant Jordi (R)	30	6	7	17	41	52	−11	25	Relegation to Regional
15	Sóller (Note: Due to the expansion of Tercera Federación to 18 teams and the promotion of Penya Independent, Sóller remained in the category)	30	4	7	19	19	61	−42	19	
16	CD Sant Jordi (R)	30	0	6	24	27	94	−67	6	Relegation to Regional

Updated to match(es) played on 23 April 2023. Source:
Rules for classification: 1) points; 2) head-to-head points; 3) head-to-head goal difference; 4) goal difference; 5) number of goals scored
(C) Champions; (P) Promoted; (R) Relegated; (Y) Qualification to the Copa del Rey

=== Group 12 – Canary Islands ===
Teams retained from 2021–22 Tercera División RFEF

- Arucas
- Gran Tarajal
- La Cuadra
- Lanzarote
- Marino
- Santa Úrsula
- Tenerife B
- Unión Sur Yaiza
- Villa de Santa Brígida

Teams relegated from 2021–22 Segunda División RFEF

- Las Palmas Atlético
- Mensajero
- Panadería Pulido
- San Fernando
- Tamaraceite

Teams promoted from 2021–22 Interinsular Preferente

- Estrella
- Ibarra

==== Teams and locations ====
Location of teams of the 2022–23 Tercera Federación Group 12

Team	City	Home ground
Arucas	Arucas	Tonono
Estrella	Santa Lucía de Tirajana	Las Palmitas
Gran Tarajal	Tuineje	Municipal
Ibarra	Las Galletas, Arona	Villa Isabel
La Cuadra	Puerto del Rosario	Municipal de Los Pozos
Lanzarote	Arrecife	Ciudad Deportiva
Las Palmas Atlético	Las Palmas	Anexo Gran Canaria
Marino	Los Cristianos, Arona	Antonio Domínguez Alfonso
Mensajero	Santa Cruz de La Palma	Silvestre Carrillo
Panadería Pulido	Vega de San Mateo	San Mateo
San Fernando	San Bartolomé de Tirajana	Ciudad Deportiva
Santa Úrsula	Santa Úrsula	Argelio Tabares
Tamaraceite	Las Palmas	Juan Guedes
Tenerife B	Santa Cruz de Tenerife	Centro Insular
Unión Sur Yaiza	Yaiza	Municipal
Villa de Santa Brígida	Santa Brígida	El Guiniguada

==== League table ====
Pos	Team	Pld	W	D	L	GF	GA	GD	Pts	Qualification
1	Mensajero (C, P, Y)	30	18	4	8	53	36	+17	58	Promotion to Segunda Federación and qualification for Copa del Rey
2	Lanzarote	30	15	8	7	51	29	+22	53	Qualification for the promotion play-offs
3	San Fernando (P)	30	15	6	9	39	25	+14	51	Qualification for the promotion play-offs
4	Las Palmas Atlético	30	13	11	6	42	27	+15	50 (Note: Las Palmas Atlético finished of Villa de Santa Brígida on overall goal difference)	Qualification for the promotion play-offs
5	Villa Santa Brígida	30	14	8	8	38	26	+12	50	Qualification for the promotion play-offs
6	Tenerife B	30	13	10	7	44	33	+11	49	
7	Panadería Pulido	30	12	11	7	36	28	+8	47	
8	Santa Úrsula	30	12	8	10	42	34	+8	44	
9	Tamaraceite	30	10	8	12	33	33	0	38 (Note: Tamaraceite finished of Unión Sur Yaiza on head-to-head points: Unión Sur Yaiza–Tamaraceite 0–1, Tamaraceite–Unión Sur Yaiza 6–0)	
10	Unión Sur Yaiza	30	10	8	12	40	49	−9	38	
11	Marino	30	11	4	15	38	44	−6	37 (Note: Marino and Arucas finished ahead of La Cuadra on head-to-head points: Marino 7 pts, Arucas 7 pts, La Cuadra 2 pts. Marino finished ahead of Arucas on overall goal difference)	
12	Arucas	30	10	7	13	37	47	−10	37	
13	La Cuadra	30	9	10	11	49	38	+11	37	
14	Ibarra (Note: Due to the expansion of Tercera Federación to 18 teams and the promotion of San Fernando, both Ibarra and Gran Tarajal remained in the category)	30	5	11	14	31	58	−27	26	
15	Gran Tarajal	30	6	7	17	29	49	−20	25	
16	Estrella (R)	30	4	5	21	19	65	−46	17	Relegation to Interinsular Preferente

Updated to match(es) played on 23 April 2023. Source:
Rules for classification: 1) points; 2) head-to-head points; 3) head-to-head goal difference; 4) goal difference; 5) number of goals scored
(C) Champions; (P) Promoted; (R) Relegated; (Y) Qualification to the Copa del Rey

=== Group 13 – Region of Murcia ===
Teams retained from 2021–22 Tercera División RFEF

- Bullense
- Caravaca
- Ciudad de Murcia
- El Palmar
- La Unión Atlético
- Lorca Deportiva
- Minera
- Murcia Imperial
- Racing Murcia
- UCAM Murcia B

Teams relegated from 2021–22 Segunda División RFEF

- Águilas
- Atlético Pulpileño

Teams promoted from 2021–22 Preferente Autonómica

- Alcantarilla
- Cieza
- Muleño
- Unión Molinense (Note: Unión Molinense took the place of Archena Sport on 11 July 2022.)

==== Teams and locations ====
Location of teams of the 2022–23 Tercera Federación Group 13

Team	City	Home ground
Águilas	Águilas	El Rubial
Alcantarilla	Alcantarilla	Ángel Sornichero
Atlético Pulpileño	Pulpí (Andalusia)	San Miguel
Bullense	Bullas	Nicolás de las Peñas
Caravaca	Caravaca de la Cruz	El Morao
Cieza	Cieza	La Arboleja
Ciudad de Murcia	Murcia	José Barnés
El Palmar	El Palmar, Murcia	Municipal
La Unión	La Unión	Municipal
Lorca Deportiva	Lorca	Francisco Artés Carrasco
Minera	Llano del Beal, Cartagena	Ángel Cedrán
Muleño	Mula	Municipal
Murcia Imperial	Murcia	Campus Universitario
Racing Murcia	Dolores de Pacheco, Torre-Pacheco	Polideportivo Municipal
UCAM Murcia B	Sangonera la Verde	El Mayayo
Unión Molinense	Molina de Segura	Sánchez Cánovas

==== League table ====
Pos	Team	Pld	W	D	L	GF	GA	GD	Pts	Qualification
1	Águilas (C, P, Y)	30	21	6	3	55	15	+40	69	Promotion to Segunda Federación and qualification for Copa del Rey
2	Lorca Deportiva (Y)	30	17	7	6	54	28	+26	58	Qualification for the promotion play-offs and Copa del Rey
3	La Unión Atlético (P)	30	16	8	6	39	23	+16	56	Qualification for the promotion play-offs
4	Racing Murcia	30	16	5	9	42	30	+12	53	Qualification for the promotion play-offs
5	Atlético Pulpileño	30	14	9	7	45	33	+12	51	Qualification for the promotion play-offs
6	Unión Molinense	30	14	8	8	44	31	+13	50	
7	Murcia Imperial	30	13	5	12	39	32	+7	44	
8	UCAM Murcia B	30	12	5	13	35	37	−2	41	
9	Cieza	30	10	10	10	43	39	+4	40	
10	El Palmar	30	10	7	13	44	51	−7	37	
11	Ciudad de Murcia	30	9	8	13	26	31	−5	35	
12	Caravaca	30	9	7	14	33	43	−10	34	
13	Minera	30	7	9	14	34	47	−13	30	
14	Alcantarilla (Note: Due to the expansion of Tercera Federación to 18 teams and the promotion of La Unión Atlético, both Alcantarilla, Muleño and Bullense remained in the category)	30	5	10	15	20	38	−18	25	
15	Muleño	30	5	6	19	33	63	−30	21	
16	Bullense	30	6	2	22	22	67	−45	20	

Updated to match(es) played on 23 April 2023. Source:
Rules for classification: 1) points; 2) head-to-head points; 3) head-to-head goal difference; 4) goal difference; 5) number of goals scored
(C) Champions; (P) Promoted; (Y) Qualification to the Copa del Rey

=== Group 14 – Extremadura ===
Teams retained from 2021–22 Tercera División RFEF

- Arroyo
- Azuaga
- Calamonte
- Don Álvaro
- Jerez
- Llerenense
- Miajadas
- Moralo
- Olivenza
- Plasencia
- Trujillo
- Villafranca

Teams promoted from Regional Preferente

- Atlético Pueblonuevo
- Fuente de Cantos
- La Estrella
- Montehermoso

==== Teams and locations ====
Location of teams of the 2022–23 Tercera Federación Group 14

Team	City	Home ground
Arroyo	Arroyo de la Luz	Municipal
Atlético Pueblonuevo	Pueblonuevo del Guadiana	Antonio Amaya
Azuaga	Azuaga	Municipal
Calamonte	Calamonte	Municipal
Don Álvaro	Don Álvaro	Manuel Barrero Pedro Macias
Fuente de Cantos	Fuente de Cantos	Francisco de Zurbarán
Jerez	Jerez de los Caballeros	Manuel Calzado Galván
La Estrella	Los Santos de Maimona	Cipriano Tinoco
Llerenense	Llerena	Fernando Robina
Miajadas	Miajadas	Municipal
Montehermoso	Montehermoso	Municipal
Moralo	Navalmoral de la Mata	Municipal
Olivenza	Olivenza	Municipal
Plasencia	Plasencia	Ciudad Deportiva
Trujillo	Trujillo	Julián García de Guadiana
Villafranca	Villafranca de los Barros	Municipal

==== League table ====
Pos	Team	Pld	W	D	L	GF	GA	GD	Pts	Qualification
1	Llerenense (C, P, Y)	30	18	10	2	52	22	+30	64	Promotion to Segunda Federación and qualification for Copa del Rey
2	Azuaga (Y)	30	19	5	6	58	29	+29	62	Qualification for the promotion play-offs and Copa del Rey
3	Moralo	30	15	10	5	52	24	+28	55	Qualification for the promotion play-offs
4	Olivenza	30	15	8	7	46	33	+13	53	Qualification for the promotion play-offs
5	Jerez	30	13	10	7	39	25	+14	49	Qualification for the promotion play-offs
6	Arroyo	30	13	7	10	30	31	−1	46	
7	Trujillo	30	12	8	10	28	28	0	44	
8	Villafranca	30	12	7	11	34	33	+1	43	
9	Calamonte	30	12	6	12	38	33	+5	42	
10	Fuente de Cantos	30	9	12	9	23	28	−5	39	
11	Atlético Pueblonuevo	30	7	11	12	36	41	−5	32	
12	Montehermoso	30	8	7	15	31	53	−22	31	
13	Don Álvaro	30	7	6	17	27	54	−27	27	
14	Miajadas (R)	30	7	5	18	23	41	−18	26	Relegation to Regional Preferente
15	Plasencia (R)	30	6	6	18	31	43	−12	24	Relegation to Regional Preferente
16	La Estrella (R)	30	5	6	19	30	60	−30	21	Relegation to Regional Preferente

Updated to match(es) played on 23 April 2023. Source:
Rules for classification: 1) points; 2) head-to-head points; 3) head-to-head goal difference; 4) goal difference; 5) number of goals scored
(C) Champions; (P) Promoted; (R) Relegated; (Y) Qualification to the Copa del Rey

=== Group 15 – Navarre ===
Location of teams of the 2022–23 Tercera Federación Group 15

Teams retained from 2021–22 Tercera División RFEF

- Avance
- Azkoyen
- Beti Onak
- Burladés
- Cantolagua
- Cortes
- Valle de Egüés
- Huarte
- Pamplona
- Subiza
- Txantrea

Teams relegated from 2021–22 Segunda División RFEF

- Ardoi
- Peña Sport

Teams promoted from 2021–22 Primera Autonómica

- Alesves
- Lagunak
- Oberena

==== Teams and locations ====
Team	City	Home ground
Alesves	Villafranca	El Palomar
Ardoi	Zizur Mayor	El Pinar
Avance	Ezcabarte	Igueldea
Azkoyen	Peralta	Las Luchas
Beti Onak	Villava	Lorenzo Goikoa
Burladés	Burlada	Ripagaina
Cantolagua	Sangüesa	Cantolagua
Cortes	Cortes	San Francisco Javier
Huarte	Huarte/Uharte	Areta
Lagunak	Barañain	Sociedad Lagunak
Oberena	Pamplona	Oberena
Pamplona	Pamplona	Bidezarra
Peña Sport	Tafalla	San Francisco
Subiza	Subiza	Sotoburu
Txantrea	Pamplona	Txantrea
Valle de Egüés	Egüés	Sarriguren

==== League table ====
Pos	Team	Pld	W	D	L	GF	GA	GD	Pts	Qualification
1	Valle de Egüés (C, P, Y)	30	18	8	4	45	18	+27	62	Promotion to Segunda Federación and qualification for Copa del Rey
2	Subiza	30	17	4	9	53	31	+22	55	Qualification for the promotion play-offs
3	Ardoi	30	16	6	8	36	26	+10	54	Qualification for the promotion play-offs
4	Peña Sport	30	14	10	6	44	28	+16	52	Qualification for the promotion play-offs
5	Huarte	30	12	12	6	41	33	+8	48	Qualification for the promotion play-offs
6	Beti Onak	30	13	6	11	43	41	+2	45	
7	Cantolagua	30	12	8	10	42	46	−4	44	
8	Lagunak	30	11	6	13	40	47	−7	39	
9	Cortes	30	11	5	14	28	34	−6	38 (Note: Cortes finished ahead of Avance on head-to-head points: Cortes–Avance 1–0, Avance–Cortes 1–2)	
10	Avance	30	11	5	14	42	41	+1	38	
11	Burladés	30	10	7	13	30	34	−4	37	
12	Pamplona	30	9	9	12	36	32	+4	36 (Note: Pamplona finished ahead of Oberena on head-to-head goal difference: Pamplona–Oberena 5–2, Oberena–Pamplona 2–1)	
13	Oberena	30	11	3	16	42	48	−6	36	
14	Txantrea (Note: Due to the expansion of Tercera Federación to 18 teams, both Txantrea and Alesves remained in the category)	30	9	8	13	34	41	−7	35	
15	Alesves	30	6	6	18	23	53	−30	24	
16	Azkoyen (R)	30	6	5	19	27	53	−26	23	Relegation to Primera Autonómica

Updated to match(es) played on 22 April 2023. Source:
Rules for classification: 1) points; 2) head-to-head points; 3) head-to-head goal difference; 4) goal difference; 5) number of goals scored
(C) Champions; (P) Promoted; (R) Relegated; (Y) Qualification to the Copa del Rey

=== Group 16 – La Rioja ===
Teams retained from 2021–22 Tercera División RFEF

- Agoncillo
- Anguiano
- Atlético Vianés
- Berceo
- Calahorra B
- Casalarreina
- Haro
- La Calzada
- Oyonesa
- River Ebro
- Varea
- Yagüe

Teams relegated from 2021–22 Segunda División RFEF

- Náxara

Teams promoted from 2021–22 Regional Preferente

- Peña Balsamaiso
- Comillas
- Racing Rioja B

==== Teams and locations ====
Location of teams of the 2022–23 Tercera Federación Group 16

Team	City	Home ground
Agoncillo	Agoncillo	San Roque
Anguiano	Anguiano	Isla
Atlético Vianés	Viana (Navarre)	Municipal
Berceo	Logroño	La Isla
Calahorra B	Calahorra	La Planilla
Casalarreina	Casalarreina	El Soto
Comillas	Logroño	Mundial 82
Haro	Haro	El Mazo
La Calzada	Santo Domingo de La Calzada	El Rollo
Náxara	Nájera	La Salera
Oyonesa	Oyón (Basque Country)	El Espinar
Peña Balsamaiso	Logroño	La Estrella
Racing Rioja B	Logroño	El Salvador
River Ebro	Rincón de Soto	San Miguel
Varea	Varea, Logroño	Municipal
Yagüe	Logroño	El Salvador

==== League table ====
Pos	Team	Pld	W	D	L	GF	GA	GD	Pts	Qualification
1	Náxara (C, P, Y)	30	22	4	4	64	26	+38	70	Promotion to Segunda Federación and qualification for Copa del Rey
2	Varea (Y)	30	19	5	6	59	35	+24	62	Qualification for the promotion play-offs and Copa del Rey
3	Agoncillo (Note: Agoncillo was relegated to Regional Preferente as their senior affiliate, UD Logroñés, and the reserve team, UD Logroñés B, were relegated from Segunda Federación.) (R)	30	19	4	7	42	23	+19	61 (Note: Agoncillo awarded a 3–0 win over Racing Rioja B after the latter fielded an ineligible player in their Round 23 match. The match had originally ended 0–1.)	Relegation to Regional Preferente
4	La Calzada	30	17	6	7	49	29	+20	57	Qualification for the promotion play-offs
5	Oyonesa	30	16	8	6	50	27	+23	56	Qualification for the promotion play-offs
6	Anguiano	30	15	7	8	48	26	+22	52	Qualification for the promotion play-offs
7	Peña Balsamaiso	30	11	6	13	27	30	−3	39	
8	Atlético Vianés	30	10	8	12	29	40	−11	38	
9	Haro	30	10	7	13	38	37	+1	37 (Note: Haro finished ahead of Calahorra B on overall goal difference)	
10	Calahorra B	30	10	7	13	35	40	−5	37	
11	Casalarreina	30	9	9	12	45	54	−9	36	
12	Berceo	30	9	7	14	40	51	−11	34 (Note: Berceo finished ahead of River Ebro on head-to-head points: River Ebro–Berceo 3–4, Berceo–River Ebro 2–0)	
13	River Ebro	30	10	4	16	33	47	−14	34	
14	Comillas (Note: Due to the expansion of Tercera Federación to 18 teams, Comillas remained in the category)	30	6	6	18	25	49	−24	24	
15	Yagüe (R)	30	4	7	19	32	64	−32	19	Relegation to Regional Preferente
16	Racing Rioja B (R)	30	3	5	22	25	63	−38	14	Relegation to Regional Preferente

Updated to match(es) played on 23 April 2023. Source:
Rules for classification: 1) points; 2) head-to-head points; 3) head-to-head goal difference; 4) goal difference; 5) number of goals scored
(C) Champions; (P) Promoted; (R) Relegated; (Y) Qualification to the Copa del Rey

=== Group 17 – Aragon ===
Location of teams of the 2022–23 Tercera Federación Group 17

Teams retained from 2021–22 Tercera División RFEF

- Atlético Monzón
- Barbastro
- Binéfar
- Calamocha
- Cariñena
- Caspe
- Cuarte
- Épila
- Illueca
- Robres

Teams relegated from 2021–22 Segunda División RFEF

- Ejea
- Huesca B

Teams promoted from 2021–22 Regional Preferente

- Almudévar
- La Almunia
- Tamarite
- Utrillas

==== Teams and locations ====
Team	City	Home ground
Almudévar	Almudévar	La Corona
Atlético Monzón	Monzón	Isidro Calderón
Barbastro	Barbastro	Municipal de los Deportes
Binéfar	Binéfar	Los Olmos
Calamocha	Calamocha	Jumaya
Cariñena	Cariñena	La Platera
Caspe	Caspe	Los Rosales
Cuarte	Cuarte de Huerva	Nuevo Municipal
Ejea	Ejea de los Caballeros	Luchán
Épila	Épila	La Huerta
Huesca B	Huesca	San Jorge
Illueca	Illueca	Papa Luna
La Almunia	La Almunia de Doña Godina	Tenerías
Robres	Robres	San Blas
Tamarite	Tamarite de Litera	La Colomina
Utrillas	Utrillas	La Vega

==== League table ====
Pos	Team	Pld	W	D	L	GF	GA	GD	Pts	Qualification
1	Robres (Note: Robres is relegated to Regional Preferente as their parent team Ebro, was relegated from Segunda Federación.) (C, R)	30	18	6	6	48	29	+19	60	Relegation to Regional Preferente
2	Barbastro (P, Y)	30	15	8	7	45	25	+20	53	Promotion to Segunda Federación and qualification for Copa del Rey
3	Huesca B	30	16	3	11	54	33	+21	51	Qualification for the promotion play-offs
4	Ejea	30	13	9	8	47	33	+14	48 (Note: Ejea finished ahead of Tamarite on head-to-head goal difference: Tamarite–Ejea 2–1, Ejea–Tamarite 5–0)	Qualification for the promotion play-offs
5	Tamarite	30	15	3	12	44	41	+3	48	Qualification for the promotion play-offs
6	Almudévar	30	13	8	9	36	28	+8	47 (Note: Almudévar finished ahead of Illueca on head-to-head points: Almudévar–Illueca 4–0, Illueca–Almudévar 0–4)	Qualification for the promotion play-offs
7	Illueca	30	13	8	9	37	38	−1	47	
8	Épila	30	10	11	9	35	29	+6	41	
9	Utrillas	30	9	12	9	33	38	−5	39	
10	Calamocha	30	10	8	12	23	26	−3	38	
11	Binéfar	30	11	4	15	42	38	+4	37	
12	Caspe	30	8	12	10	30	39	−9	36	
13	Cuarte	30	7	14	9	27	34	−7	35	
14	Atlético Monzón (Note: Due to the expansion of Tercera Federación to 18 teams, both Atlético Monzón and Cariñena remained in the category)	30	6	10	14	24	33	−9	28	
15	Cariñena	30	5	9	16	34	65	−31	24	
16	La Almunia (R)	30	5	7	18	34	64	−30	22	Relegation to Regional Preferente

Updated to match(es) played on 23 April 2023. Source:
Rules for classification: 1) points; 2) head-to-head points; 3) head-to-head goal difference; 4) goal difference; 5) number of goals scored
(C) Champions; (P) Promoted; (R) Relegated; (Y) Qualification to the Copa del Rey

=== Group 18 – Castilla–La Mancha ===
Teams retained from 2021–22 Tercera División RFEF

- Azuqueca
- Conquense
- Illescas
- Manchego
- Quintanar del Rey
- Tarancón
- Torrijos
- Villacañas
- Villarrobledo
- Villarrubia

Teams relegated from 2021–22 Segunda División RFEF

- Calvo Sotelo Puertollano
- Marchamalo
- Toledo

Teams promoted from 2021–22 Primera Autonómica Preferente

- Atlético Tomelloso
- La Solana
- Talavera de la Reina B

==== Teams and locations ====
Location of teams of the 2022–23 Tercera Federación Group 18

Team	City	Home ground
Atlético Tomelloso	Tomelloso	Paco Gálvez
Azuqueca	Azuqueca de Henares	San Miguel
Calvo Sotelo	Puertollano	Ciudad de Puertollano
Conquense	Cuenca	La Fuensanta
Illescas	Illescas, Toledo	Municipal
La Solana	La Solana	La Moheda
Manchego	Ciudad Real	Juan Carlos I
Marchamalo	Marchamalo	La Solana
Quintanar del Rey	Quintanar del Rey	San Marcos
Talavera de la Reina B	Talavera de la Reina	Diego Mateo "Zarra"
Tarancón	Tarancón	Municipal
Toledo	Toledo	Salto del Caballo
Torrijos	Torrijos	San Francisco
Villacañas	Villacañas	Las Pirámides
Villarrobledo	Villarrobledo	Nuestra Señora de la Caridad
Villarrubia	Villarrubia de los Ojos	Nuevo Municipal

==== League table ====
Pos	Team	Pld	W	D	L	GF	GA	GD	Pts	Qualification
1	Manchego (C, P, Y)	30	17	11	2	43	14	+29	62	Promotion to Segunda Federación and qualification for Copa del Rey
2	Illescas (P)	30	14	10	6	43	22	+21	52	Qualification for the promotion play-offs
3	Quintanar del Rey	30	14	8	8	46	28	+18	50	Qualification for the promotion play-offs
4	Calvo Sotelo	30	12	10	8	39	27	+12	46 (Note: Calvo Sotelo finished ahead of Villarrubia on head-to-head points: Villarrubia–Calvo Sotelo 1–1, Calvo Sotelo–Villarrubia 1–0)	Qualification for the promotion play-offs
5	Villarrubia	30	11	13	6	34	25	+9	46	Qualification for the promotion play-offs
6	Conquense	30	11	12	7	26	15	+11	45	
7	Villacañas	30	12	7	11	36	36	0	43	
8	Toledo	30	11	8	11	29	33	−4	41 (Note: Toledo finished ahead of Torrijos on head-to-head points: Torrijos–Toledo 1–1, Toledo–Torrijos 1–0)	
9	Torrijos	30	11	8	11	36	30	+6	41	
10	Marchamalo	30	10	10	10	36	37	−1	40	
11	Tarancón	30	9	11	10	40	40	0	38 (Note: Tarancón finished ahead of Azuqueca on head-to-head points: Tarancón–Azuqueca 2–2, Azuqueca–Tarancón 3–4)	
12	Azuqueca	30	8	14	8	40	43	−3	38	
13	Villarrobledo	30	8	11	11	28	32	−4	35	
14	La Solana (Note: Due to the expansion of Tercera Federación to 18 teams and the promotion of Illescas, both La Solana and Atlético Tomelloso remained in the category)	30	5	12	13	25	52	−27	27	
15	Atlético Tomelloso	30	6	7	17	24	54	−30	25	
16	Talavera de la Reina B (R)	30	1	8	21	23	60	−37	11	Relegation to Primera Autonómica Preferente

Updated to match(es) played on 23 April 2023. Source:
Rules for classification: 1) points; 2) head-to-head points; 3) head-to-head goal difference; 4) goal difference; 5) number of goals scored
(C) Champions; (P) Promoted; (R) Relegated; (Y) Qualification to the Copa del Rey

== Qualification for Copa del Rey ==
In addition to the 18 best-placed non-reserve teams qualifying for the 2023–24 Copa del Rey, the seven best non-reserve runners-up of the 18 groups that have not already qualified will also participate.

Pos	Grp	Team	Pld	W	D	L	GF	GA	GD	Pts	Qualification or relegation
1	9	Jaén (Q)	30	21	5	4	58	12	+46	68	Qualification for Copa del Rey
2	14	Azuaga (Q)	30	19	5	6	58	29	+29	62	Qualification for Copa del Rey
3	8	Atlético Astorga (Q)	30	18	7	5	54	27	+27	61	Qualification for Copa del Rey
4	11	Manacor (Q)	30	17	9	4	51	26	+25	60	Qualification for Copa del Rey
5	1	Arosa (Q)	30	16	10	4	45	26	+19	58	Qualification for Copa del Rey
6	6	Atzeneta (Q)	30	15	13	2	46	23	+23	58	Qualification for Copa del Rey
7	13	Lorca Deportiva (Q)	30	17	7	6	54	28	+26	58	Qualification for Copa del Rey
8	16	Varea (Q)	30	19	5	6	59	35	+24	62	Second-place team already qualified
9	17	Barbastro (Q)	30	15	8	7	45	25	+20	53	Second-place team already qualified
10	4	Vitoria	30	16	10	4	49	18	+31	58	
11	3	Vimenor	30	16	9	5	56	32	+24	57	
12	5	Sant Andreu	30	15	11	4	50	31	+19	56	
13	15	Subiza	30	17	4	9	53	21	+32	55	
14	12	Lanzarote	30	15	8	7	51	29	+22	53	
15	18	Illescas	30	14	10	6	43	22	+21	52	
16	7	RSC Internacional	30	21	4	5	73	27	+46	67	Ineligible for Copa del Rey
17	2	Sporting Atlético	30	19	7	4	56	21	+35	64	Ineligible for Copa del Rey
18	10	Córdoba B	30	15	13	2	44	19	+25	58	Ineligible for Copa del Rey

Updated to match(es) played on 23 April 2023. Source:
Rules for classification: 1) points; 2) goal difference; 3) number of goals scored
(Q) Qualified for the phase indicated

== See also ==
- 2022–23 La Liga
- 2022–23 Segunda División
- 2022–23 Primera Federación
- 2022–23 Segunda Federación
