= Yuan Yung-cheng =

Taiwanese footballer

Personal information
- Date of birth: 12 November 2002 (age 23)
- Place of birth: Taipei, Taiwan
- Height: 1.70 m (5 ft 7 in)
- Position: Winger

Team information
- Current team: Inter Sevilla

Youth career
- Guangzhou City
- 2018–2019: Alcobendas
- 2019: Getafe
- 2020–2021: Langreo
- 2021: Paterna

Senior career*
Years	Team	Apps	(Gls)
2020	Tainan TSG	1	(0)
2021	Paterna B	1	(0)
2021–2022	Racing Rioja B	17	(4)
2022	Racing Rioja	2	(0)
2022–2023	Gran Tarajal	8	(0)
2023	River Ebro		
2023–2024	Fuenlabrada	1	(0)
2024	Inter Sevilla		
2025	Agoncillo		

International career
2025–	Chinese Taipei	1	(0)
- * Club domestic league appearances and goals

Yuan Yung-cheng (Chinese: 袁永誠; born 12 November 2002) is a Taiwanese footballer who plays as a winger for Spanish club Inter Sevilla and the Chinese Taipei national team.

== Early life ==
Yuan was born on 12 November 2002 in Taipei, Taiwan. The son of Taiwanese cinematographer Yuan Qing-guo, his family had to mortgage their house to fund his football studies in Spain. Growing up, he swam, attended Shuangfeng Elementary School in Taiwan, and regarded Argentina international Lionel Messi as his football idol.

== Career ==
As a youth player, Yuan joined the youth academy of Chinese side Guangzhou City. Following his stint there, he played for the youth academies of Spanish sides Alcobendas, Getafe, Langreo, and Paterna. In 2020, he signed for Tainan TSG in Taiwan, helping the club win the league, their first major trophy. In 2021, he signed for Spanish fourth tier club Racing Rioja, where he made two league appearances and scored zero goals.

In 2022, Yuan signed for Gran Tarajal in the Spanish fifth tier, where he made eight league appearances and scored zero goals. Subsequently, he signed for Spanish side River Ebro in 2023. The same year, he signed for Spanish side Fuenlabrada, where he made one league appearance and scored zero goals. Ahead of the 2024–25 season, he signed for Spanish side Inter Sevilla. Six months later, he signed for Spanish side Agoncillo.
