= Valen (footballer) =

Spanish footballer (born 2004)

Personal information
- Full name: Valentín Gómez Mirón
- Date of birth: 15 January 2004 (age 22)
- Place of birth: Parrillas, Spain
- Position: Winger

Team information
- Current team: Talavera
- Number: 19

Youth career
- Rayo Vallecano
- Talavera
- 2020–2023: Almería

Senior career*
Years	Team	Apps	(Gls)
2023–2025	Almería B	56	(8)
2024–2025	Almería	1	(0)
2025–	Talavera	21	(0)
- * Club domestic league appearances and goals as of 10 June 2026

Valentín Gómez Mirón (born 15 January 2004), commonly known as Valen, is a Spanish professional footballer who plays mainly as a right winger for CF Talavera de la Reina.

== Career ==
Born in Parrillas, Toledo, Castilla–La Mancha, Valen represented Rayo Vallecano and CF Talavera de la Reina as a youth before signing for UD Almería in January 2020. He made his senior debut with the reserves on 26 March 2023, coming on as a first-half substitute for injured Marko Milovanović in a 3–0 Tercera Federación home loss to Marbella FC.

Definitely promoted to the B-team ahead of the 2023–24 season, Valen scored his first senior goal on 29 October 2023, netting the opener in a 2–0 home win over Arenas CD. He scored a further eight times for the side in 32 appearances, as they achieved promotion to Segunda Federación in the play-offs.

Valen made his first team debut on 24 August 2024, replacing Sergio Arribas late into a 1–0 Segunda División away win over CD Tenerife. On 26 August of the following year, he returned to Talavera after a trial period, now for the first team in Primera Federación.
