= Pedro Díaz (footballer, born 1977) =

Spanish footballer and manager

Personal information
- Full name: Pedro Díaz Muñoz
- Date of birth: 18 June 1977 (age 49)
- Place of birth: Talavera de la Reina, Spain
- Height: 1.70 m (5 ft 7 in)
- Position: Winger

Team information
- Current team: Talavera (manager)

Youth career
- –1996: Atlético Madrid

Senior career*
Years	Team	Apps	(Gls)
1996–2003	Talavera CF	95	(15)
1999–2000	→ Torpedo 66 (loan)		
2003	Novelda	17	(1)
2003–2006	Talavera CF	110	(8)
2006–2009	Linares	106	(22)
2009–2010	Ceuta	15	(1)
2010–2012	Puertollano	66	(6)
2012–2017	Talavera	65	(3)
Total		474	(56)

Managerial career
- 2017–2021: Talavera (youth)
- 2021–2022: Talavera B
- 2022–2024: Talavera
- 2024–2026: Linares
- 2026–: Talavera
- * Club domestic league appearances and goals

Pedro Díaz Muñoz (born 18 June 1977) is a Spanish former footballer who played as a winger, and currently is the manager of CF Talavera de la Reina.

== Playing career ==
Born in Talavera de la Reina, Castilla–La Mancha, Díaz was a youth graduate of Atlético Madrid, before making his senior debut with hometown side Talavera CF in 1996. After failing to make a breakthrough in the starting XI, he was loaned to Tercera División side AD Torpedo 66 in the 1999–2000 season.

Upon returning, Díaz started to feature regularly with Talavera before leaving for fellow third division side Novelda CF in January 2003. He returned to Talavera in July, before signing for CD Linares of the same category in 2006.

Díaz scored a career-best 15 goals overall in the 2006–07 season, as Linares missed out promotion in the play-offs. On 22 July 2009, he moved to AD Ceuta also in division three. He moved to CD Puertollano in the same category in the following year, before returning to his hometown on 20 July 2012, after signing for CF Talavera de la Reina.

In 2017, after another promotion with Talavera, Díaz retired at the age of 40.

== Managerial career ==
Immediately after retiring, Díaz became manager of the youth sides of his last club Talavera. On 6 June 2021, he was named manager of their B-team in the Primera Autonómica Preferente.

On 25 October 2022, after leading Talavera B to a first-ever promotion to Tercera Federación the previous campaign, Díaz was named in charge of the first team in Primera Federación, following the sacking of Rubén Gala. Despite suffering relegation, he renewed his contract in May 2023, but was dismissed on 8 April 2024.

On 27 December 2024, Díaz was named as the new manager of Linares in Segunda Federación on a deal until the end of the season, following the sacking of Juan Antonio Milla.

== Managerial statistics ==
As of 25 October 2026

Managerial record by team and tenure
Team	Nat	From	To	Record								Ref
Team	Nat	From	To	G	W	D	L	GF	GA	GD	Win %	Ref
Talavera B	(Spain)	6 June 2021	25 October 2022	41	24	8	9	88	36	+52	58.54	
Talavera	(Spain)	25 October 2022	8 April 2024	65	22	19	24	66	73	−7	33.85	
Linares	(Spain)	27 December 2024	12 January 2026	35	12	14	9	41	38	+3	34.29	
Talavera	(Spain)	21 September 2026	Present	5	4	1	0	10	3	+7	80.00	
Total				146	62	42	42	205	150	+55	42.47	—
