= Yin Tiesheng =

Chinese footballer and coach

Yin Tiesheng 殷铁生
Personal information
- Full name: Yin Tiesheng
- Date of birth: August 16, 1956 (age 70)
- Place of birth: Jinan, Shandong, China
- Height: 1.76 m (5 ft 9 in)

Youth career
- 1972–1974: Shandong Team

Senior career*
Years	Team	Apps	(Gls)
1974–1988	Shandong Team	?	(?)

Managerial career
- 1990–1993: Shandong Youth
- 1991: China U17
- 1994–1997: Shandong Taishan
- 1998: Shandong Taishan
- 1999–2004: Changchun Yatai
- 2004–2005: China U20
- 2005–2007: Qingdao Jonoon
- 2008–2009: China (caretaker)
- 2016–2017: Qingdao Jonoon
- 2018–2020: Taizhou Yuanda
- 2021–2023: Qingdao Hainiu
- * Club domestic league appearances and goals as of May 7, 2008

Yin Tiesheng (simplified Chinese: 殷铁生; traditional Chinese: 殷鐵生; pinyin: Yīn Tiěshēng; born August 16, 1956, in Jinan, Shandong, China) is a Chinese former football player who is currently a manager.

== Playing career ==
As a player, Yin Tiesheng started his career playing for the Shandong youth team and by 1974 he was even called up to the Chinese national under-20 football team as well. Also within that year he graduated to the Shandong's senior team and played within the top tier of Chinese football. In 1979 Shandong were allowed to participate in the Chinese National Games, which they won; however, despite being a loyal servant to the club throughout his entire career and often seeing them being title contenders, this was his only medal he won before he retired in 1988 due to hepatitis.

== Management career ==
=== Shandong ===
After Yin retired he remained with Shandong, where he became their youth team manager in 1990. After a brief stint he attracted the interests of the Chinese Football Association and worked with the Chinese U-17 team in 1991. After that short spell he returned to the Shandong youth team and went on to win the 1993 National Youth League title. This then saw him promoted to managing the senior team of Shandong Taishan where he won the Chinese FA Cup in 1995. His time at the club ended at the end of the 1997 league season after he was unable to improve the club's league results; however, he remained faithful towards the team and returned to the club near the end of the 1998 league season to aid the club in their relegation battle. While he did not remain as manager, he did stay on as the administrative manager of the team when they won the national championship in 1999 before leaving the club.

=== Changchun Yatai ===
In 1999, Yin became the manager of lower league club Changchun Yatai, and during his reign he guided the club to a runners-up position within the second tier at the end of the 2001 Chinese league season; however, the club were denied promotion after it was discovered that certain players and coaches had fixed matches. Yin remained as coach and at the end of the 2003 league season went on to win the division championship.

=== China U-20 ===
Yin coached China national under-20 football team in 2004, where he coached them in the AFC U-19 Championship tournament, where they eventually became the runner-up in that competition against Korea Republic. Yin was praised as a shrewd tactician and for encouraging many members of that team to subsequently graduate to the national side.

=== Qingdao Jonoon ===
He coached another Shandong club Qingdao Jonoon from 2005 to 2008.

=== China ===
Yin became the last minute care-taker coach for the Chinese U-23 team, which had already qualified for the Football at the 2008 Summer Olympics as hosts. During his short time as coach for the China U-23 team he was assigned with the task of coaching the team to a minimum of three competitive games against New Zealand, Belgium and Brazil. However, due to his short time, he couldn't implement his ideas in the team, and China were eliminated within the group stages.

On 9 December 2008, he was called as Interimscoach for China after Vladimir Petrovic stepped down in the wake of China's exit from the 2010 FIFA World Cup qualification in the Asian Zone. Yin was assigned to coach the two imminent 2011 AFC Asian Cup qualification matches to be held on 14 and 21 January 2009 as well as the immediate friendlies leading up to the qualifiers where his reign as coach was mixed with a loss against Syria and a win against Vietnam.

== Honours ==
=== Manager ===
Shandong Taishan

- Chinese FA Cup: 1995

Changchun Yatai

- Chinese Jia B: 2003
