= Luis Acosta (footballer) =

Spanish footballer (born 1994)

Personal information
- Full name: Luis Acosta Mena
- Date of birth: 13 July 1994 (age 32)
- Place of birth: Cádiz, Spain
- Height: 1.78 m (5 ft 10 in)
- Position: Centre-back

Team information
- Current team: Talavera de la Reina
- Number: 15

Youth career
- Polideportivo Cádiz
- Cádiz
- 2008–2013: Atlético Madrid

Senior career*
Years	Team	Apps	(Gls)
2013–2014	Atlético Madrid C	0	(0)
2013–2014	→ Carabanchel (loan)	24	(0)
2014–2015	Olímpic Xàtiva	31	(0)
2015–2016	Pobla Mafumet	19	(0)
2016–2017	Getafe B	26	(0)
2016	Getafe	1	(0)
2017–2018	Eldense	21	(0)
2018	Navalcarnero	15	(0)
2018–2019	Burgos	7	(0)
2019	→ Guijuelo (loan)	10	(0)
2020	Albacete B	15	(0)
2020–2022	Unionistas	56	(2)
2022–2024	Mérida	70	(0)
2024–2026	Marbella	34	(0)
2026–	Talavera de la Reina	15	(0)

International career
- Spain U15
2009	Spain U16	3	(1)
- * Club domestic league appearances and goals as of 10 June 2026

Luis Acosta Mena (born 13 July 1994) is a Spanish footballer who plays for Talavera de la Reina as a central defender.

== Club career ==
Born in Cádiz, Andalusia, Acosta joined Atlético Madrid's youth setup in 2008 at the age of 14, from Cádiz CF. He was promoted to the C-team in July 2013, but never appeared for the side due to injury.

On 19 December 2013 Acosta was loaned to Tercera División side RCD Carabanchel, until the end of the season. On 8 August 2014, he joined CD Olímpic de Xàtiva of the Segunda División B.

In July 2015 Acosta signed for another reserve team, CF Pobla de Mafumet also of the third division. The following year he moved to Getafe CF B of the fourth level.

Acosta made his first-team debut on 12 November 2016, starting and being booked in a 0–1 away loss against Gimnàstic de Tarragona in the Segunda División. He left Geta in the following 24 August, signing for CD Eldense in the fourth division.

On 25 January 2018, Acosta returned to the third division after agreeing to a contract with CDA Navalcarnero. On 8 July, he signed a two-year contract with fellow league team Burgos CF, but moved to CD Guijuelo on loan on 31 December.

On 1 November 2019, after spending the first months of the season without a club, Acosta signed for Albacete Balompié's B-team in division four. The following 21 September, he returned to the third tier after agreeing to a deal with Unionistas de Salamanca CF.

On 1 July 2024, Acosta signed a two-season contract with Marbella in the third tier.
