= Qingdao Hainiu F.C. =

Chinese football club

Qingdao Hainiu Qīngdǎo Hǎiniú 青岛海牛
- Full name: Qingdao Hainiu Football Club 青岛海牛足球俱乐部
- Nicknames: Hainiu (Sea Bull, 海牛)
- Founded: 1990; 36 years ago (as Shandong Economic and Trade Commission F.C.); 31 December 1993; 32 years ago (as Qingdao Hainiu F.C.)
- Ground: Qingdao Youth Football Stadium
- Capacity: 50,000
- Owner: Qingdao Jonoon Group
- Chairman: Qiao Weiguang
- Head coach: Milan Ristić
- League: China League One
- 2026: Chinese Super League, 16th of 16 (relegated)
Home colours	Away colours

Qingdao Hainiu Football Club (Chinese: 青岛海牛足球俱乐部; pinyin: Qīngdǎo Hǎiniú Zúqiú Jùlèbù; lit. 'Qingdao Sea Bull F.C.') is a Chinese professional football club based in Qingdao, Shandong, that competes in China League One, the second tier of Chinese football. Qingdao Hainiu plays its home matches at the Qingdao Youth Football Stadium, located within Chengyang District. Their current owners are the privately owned cable manufacturers Qingdao Jonoon Group.

The club was founded as Shandong Economic and Trade Commission Football Club in 1990 and started at the bottom of the Chinese football league pyramid in the third tier. On December 31, 1993, they became the first professional club in Qingdao and changed its name to Qingdao Manatee. They went on to establish themselves as a top-tier club and won their first major trophy in 2002 by winning the Chinese FA Cup on November 16, 2002, when they beat Liaoning Bird. In the mid-2010s the club started to decline and fell down two leagues, being relegated twice in 4 seasons. In 2021 and 2022 the club achieved two consecutive promotions, making it back to the Chinese Super League.

== History ==
Qingdao Jonoon Football Club started out as Shandong Economic and Trade Commission F.C. in 1990 by some retired footballers at the corporation affiliated with Shandong economic and trade commission associated with some workers at Qingdao Municipal Sanatorium. After playing in the Chinese Yi League for three seasons, the club finished as Second Division Champions and won promotion to the Chinese Jia-B League in 1992 – the club's first league title. As required by Chinese Football Association, on 31 December 1993, the club set up a professional system and became the first professional football club in Qingdao. Subsequently, the club was renamed to Qingdao Manatee F.C., the Chinese name for manatee, "海牛 (hainiu, literally 'sea bull')", also being the nickname for the foghorn in Tuandao Lighthouse due to the sound it emits.

Qingdao Hainiu F.C. logo in 1995

Qingdao Manatee finished as the Chinese Jia-B League Champions and won promotion to the Chinese Jia-A League in 1994. In the following season, the club was invited to compete the Tainland Queen's Cup and achieved the third place with 2 wins, 1 draw and 1 loss – the club's first international honour. However, in domestic league the club was relegated to the Division 1B after losing an epic battle against Sichuan Quanxing 2–3. In 1996, the club appointed Wu Hongyue as manager, who led the team to a second-place league finish and regained promotion to the Division 1A. Soon after that season, the state-run tobacco producer – Qingdao Etsong Group started to invest the club, which changed its name to Qingdao Etsong Hainiu F.C. the following year. From 1997 season, the club became a regular member of the top division and was never relegated since then. On November 16, 2002, after beating Liaoning Bird 2–0 in Etsong Sports Center, the club won its first major trophy: the 2002 Chinese FA Cup.

After eight-year management by Etsong Group, the club was transferred to a privately owned cable manufacturer – Qingdao Jonoon Group and dropped the long term icon "Hainiu" from its name in December 2004. The club's new owner slashed down the budget greatly, sold up all notable players and assigned the former Jinan taishan's coach Yin Tiesheng as manager, who is famous for his defending style. In the following three seasons, Yin brought Jonoon to stay firmly in the middle position of the league. In 2008, after Yin's assignment as assistant coach of China Olympic team, the club promoted the assistant coach Guo Kanfeng as head coach and retained eighth place in that season. After six-round terrible management in the following season, Guo was sacked by the club and former notable Serbian coach Slobodan Santrač took over as manager. Though finished at thirteenth place, the team played a beautiful attacking soccer style and even the attacking combination was duplicated by the National Team head coach Gao Hongbo. Soon after 2009 season, the club surprisingly sacked Santrač and reassigned Guo as actual head coach, with Dragan Jovanovič assigned as nominal head coach due to Gu's lack of qualification. In 2010, the club endured a horrible season and lost the last match against Hangzhou Greentown 0–1, but surprisingly survived from relegation in the fourteenth place.

Jonoon F.C. logo in 2008

In the 2013 league season the team's manager Chang Woe-Ryong was sacked from the club despite the team sitting in tenth. The club would experience relegation at the end of the season and the club's owners publicly declared that one of their own players in Gabriel Melkam was match fixing, which resulted in their relegation. Gabriel Melkam would claim that the accusations of match-fixing were a ploy by the owners not to pay his wages and he took his case to FIFA. While this was going on further claims of mismanagement would arise with the transfer of the club's captain Liu Jian move to Guangzhou Evergrande when it was discovered that the club had forged an extension in his contract. In the 2014 league season the club were found guilty for breaking the Chinese FA's rules and were deducted 7 points.

In 2016 Qingdao Jonoon finished second-to-last in the League One and were relegated to the third level of the Chinese league system. Qingdao Huanghai, another team in the League One in the same city, started to get more attention. Qingdao had no more foreign players by 2019. In the 2019 season, there were deducted six points for a rule violation.

In 2026, Qingdao Jonoon started the 2026 Chinese Super League season with seven points deducted for violation of sports ethics and loss of sportsmanship, engaging in improper transactions to seek illegitimate benefits.

== Ownership and naming history ==
Year	Owner	Club name	Sponsored team name
1990–1993		Shandong Economic and Trade Commission	Shandong Economic and Trade Commission
1994–1996		Qingdao Manatee	Qingdao Manatee
1997	Qingdao Etsong Group	Qingdao Etsong Hainiu	Qingdao Manatee
1998–2000	Qingdao Etsong Group	Qingdao Etsong Hainiu	Qingdao Etsong Hainiu
2001	Qingdao Etsong Group	Qingdao Etsong Hainiu	Qingdao Beer
2002	Qingdao Etsong Group	Qingdao Etsong Hainiu	Qingdao Hademen
2003–2004	Qingdao Etsong Group	Qingdao Etsong Hainiu	Qingdao Sbright
2005–2006	Qingdao Jonoon Group	Qingdao Jonoon	Qingdao Zhongneng
2007	Qingdao Jonoon Group	Qingdao Jonoon	Qingdao Handicraft City
2008	Qingdao Jonoon Group	Qingdao Jonoon	Qingdao Shengwen Jonoon
2009–2020	Qingdao Jonoon Group	Qingdao Jonoon	Qingdao Jonoon
2021–present	Qingdao Jonoon Group	Qingdao Hainiu	Qingdao Hainiu

== Kits and colours ==
The club's first choice of home kit colors were all red and they did not have a badge until they won promotion. When they won promotion they changed the club's home kit colors to yellow and their name to Qingdao Manatee (海牛), which Chinese name also literally means "Sea Bull", which directly influenced their badge design, which was simply a bull. The owners Etsong Group decided to rebrand the club once more with a new badge, which was a simple striped design with the new owners name at the top while the new kit colors became red and white. With Jonoon Group coming in as their new sponsor the club changed their colors once again to blue while using red as their new away colors. When the Jonoon Group took over they incorporated their own logo of two tigers merged as the club's new badge and chose orange as the new home colors because they believe it represents "passion and energy" as well as also being the same color of their own brand.

=== Kit evolution ===
1992–94	1995–97	1998–99	2000–03	2004

== Grounds ==
The current home stadium of Qingdao Hainiu is the Qingdao Youth Football Stadium, which opened in 2023.

The previous stadium of Qingdao Hainiu Football Club was Qingdao Tiantai Stadium, which is also known as Qingdao First Stadium. Tiantai Stadium is a multi-purpose stadium built in 1933 as Qingdao Municipal Stadium, and was renamed Qingdao First Stadium in 1955. Qingdao Jonoon started to play in Tiantai Stadium in the first three professional seasons, and resided there permanently from 2007 to 2019.

== Players ==
=== Current squad ===
As of 14 July 2026

Note: Flags indicate national team as defined under FIFA eligibility rules; some limited exceptions apply. Players may hold more than one non-FIFA nationality.

No.	Pos.	Nation	Player
1	GK	CHN	Liu Jun
3	DF	CHN	Liu Junshuai
4	DF	CHN	Jin Yangyang
5	DF	CHN	Mustapa Tash
6	MF	MAR	Malcom Edjouma
7	FW	GHA	Yaw Yeboah
8	MF	CHN	Lin Chuangyi
9	FW	CHN	Liu Xinyu
10	FW	SWE	Carlos Strandberg
14	DF	CHN	Sun Zheng'ao
16	DF	CHN	Li Hailong
17	DF	CHN	Wang Qiao
19	FW	CHN	Song Wenjie
20	DF	CHN	Gong Ruicong
21	FW	CHN	Liu Guobao
22	FW	CHN	Yang Cong
23	DF	CHN	Song Long

No.	Pos.	Nation	Player
24	MF	HKG	Ngan Cheuk Pan
26	DF	SRB	Nemanja Anđelković
27	FW	CHN	Kuang Zhaolei
28	GK	CHN	Mu Pengfei
29	DF	CHN	Li Suda
30	MF	CHN	Che Shiwei
31	MF	CHN	Luo Senwen
32	MF	SRB	Lazar Tufegdžić
33	DF	CHN	Liu Jiashen
34	MF	CHN	Jin Yonghao
37	DF	CHN	Wei Zixian
39	DF	CHN	Li Sirong (on loan from Tianjin Jinmen Tiger)
43	GK	CHN	Mewlan Jappar
47	MF	CHN	Zheng Chuanhui
52	DF	CHN	Yi Xinyang
53	MF	CHN	Cui Jingyao
55	GK	CHN	Jiang Yuhan

=== Reserve squad ===
Note: Flags indicate national team as defined under FIFA eligibility rules; some limited exceptions apply. Players may hold more than one non-FIFA nationality.

No.	Pos.	Nation	Player

=== Out on loan ===
Note: Flags indicate national team as defined under FIFA eligibility rules; some limited exceptions apply. Players may hold more than one non-FIFA nationality.

No.	Pos.	Nation	Player
—	MF	CHN	Gao Yixuan (at (China) Tai'an Tiankuang until 31 December 2026)
—	FW	CHN	Zhang Ruiqi (at (China) Jiangxi Dingnan United until 31 December 2026)
—	DF	CHN	Li Jiarong (at (China) Jiangxi Dingnan United until 31 December 2026)
—	FW	CHN	Zhao Yi (at (China) Ganzhou Ruishi until 31 December 2026)
—	DF	CHN	Guo Fuxin (at (China) Ganzhou Ruishi until 31 December 2026)
—	MF	CHN	Gong Ruicong (at (China) Ganzhou Ruishi until 31 December 2026)

No.	Pos.	Nation	Player
—	GK	CHN	Wang Kuan (at (China) Shanxi Chongde Ronghai until 31 December 2026)
—	GK	CHN	Teng Hui (at (China) Changchun Xidu until 31 December 2026)
—	GK	CHN	Zhang Daolin (at (China) Xiamen Feilu until 31 December 2026)
—	DF	CHN	Wu Xingyu (at (China) Nantong Zhiyun until 31 December 2026)
—	DF	CHN	Zhang Wei (at (China) Shanghai Port B until 31 December 2026)

== Club officials ==
=== Current coaching staff ===
Position	Staff
Head coach	vacant
Assistant coach	(China) Zheng Long (Serbia) Mihajlo Jurasovic (China) Wang Weilong (China) Xing Dong
Goalkeeping coach	(China) Liu Zhenli (China) Yang Fan

Source: Dongqiudi.com

=== Managerial history ===
Information correct as of end of 2024 league season.

- (China) Wang Shouye (1990–91)
- (China) Liu Guojiang (1992)
- (China) Wang Shouye (1993–94)
- (China) Xu Yonglai (1995)
- (China) Wu Hongyue (1996)
- (China) Liu Guojiang (1997)
- (China) Li Yingfa (1998)
- (South Korea) Kim Jung-Nam (1999)
- (China) Guo Zuojin (Caretaker) (1999)
- (China) Wang Shouye (Caretaker) (1999)
- (China) Yang Weijian (Caretaker) (1999)
- (Serbia) Miloljub Ostojić (2000)
- (China) Guo Zuojin (2000–01)
- (South Korea) Lee Jang-Soo (2002–03)
- (China) Tang Lepu (2004)
- (China) Wang Weiman (Caretaker) (2004)
- (China) Yin Tiesheng (2005–07)
- (China) Guo Kanfeng (2008–09)
- (Serbia) Slobodan Santrač (April 30, 2009 – Nov 11, 2009)
- (Serbia) Dragan Jovanovič (2010) The actual manager is Guo Kanfeng
- (China) Ji Yujie (2010) The actual manager is Guo Kanfeng
- (South Korea) Chang Woe-Ryong (Jan 1, 2011 – Dec 31, 2011)
- (Bosnia and Herzegovina) Blaž Slišković (Jan 20, 2012 – March 13, 2012)
- (China) Yang Weijian (Caretaker) (2012)
- (South Korea) Chang Woe-Ryong (May 24, 2012 – Aug 20, 2013)
- (China) Li Yingfa (Caretaker) (Aug 20, 2013 – Sept 5, 2013)
- (Serbia) Goran Stevanović (Sept 5, 2013 – Oct 30, 2013)
- (China) Li Xiaopeng (Oct 30, 2013–22 July 2014)
- (Slovenia) Tomaž Kavčič (24 July 2014 – 5 October 2015)
- (Serbia) Dragan Stančić (Caretaker) (5 October 2015 – 15 December 2015)
- (China) Su Maozhen (15 December 2015 – 6 September 2016)
- (China) Yin Tiesheng (6 September 2016 – 25 December 2017)
- (Serbia) Goran Stevanović (25 December 2017 – 14 June 2018)
- (Serbia) Aleksandar Kristić (14 June 2018 – 23 December 2019)
- (China) Zhu Jiong (23 December 2019 – 18 January 2021)
- (China) Yin Tiesheng (19 January 2021 – 12 February 2023)
- (Spain) Antonio Carreño (13 February 2023 – 22 December 2023)
- (Bulgaria) Yasen Petrov (25 December 2023 – 17 January 2025)
- (China) Li Xiaopeng (18 January 2025 – 22 December 2025）
- (Serbia) Milan Ristić (27 December 2025 – 6 November 2026）

== Honours ==
Qingdao Jonoon's first trophy was the Chinese Yi League Champions, which it won as Shandong Economic and Trade Commission in 1992. In 1995, the club won its first international honour as Qingdao Hainiu – the Thailand Queen's Cup third place. In 2002, the club won its first major trophy – the China FA Cup, which allowed to enter the Chinese FA Super Cup where they came Runners-up that season.

Domestic

- Chinese FA Cup
  - Winners: 2002
- Chinese Football Super Cup
  - Runners-up: 2002
- Chinese Jia-B League / China League One (level 2)
  - Champions: 1994
  - Runners-up: 1993, 1996, 2022
- Chinese Yi League / China League Two (level 3)
  - Champions: 1992, 2021

Reserve team

- Coca-Cola Olympic League Champions: 2

1998, 1999

Youth team:

- U19 FA Cup Winners: 1

2006

=== International ===
- Queen's Cup Third-place: 1

1995

=== Player honours ===
Chinese Football Association Young Player of the Year

- (China) Qu Bo – 2000
- (China) Song Wenjie – 2012

Best 11 in the Chinese Football Association Team of the year

- (China) Chen Gang – 1999, DF
- (China) Liu Jian – 2007, MF
- (China) Qu Bo – 2009, FW

== Results ==
All-time league rankings

- As of the end of 2023 season.

Year	Div	Pld	W	D	L	GF	GA	GD	Pts	Pos.	FA Cup	Super Cup	League Cup	AFC	Att./G	Stadium
1990	3	10							7^{1}	3	DNQ	–	–			
1991	3	9								3	DNQ	–	–			
1992	3	6	5	1	0	14	5	+9	5^{1}	C	DNQ	–	–			
1993	2	9	5	2/1	1	14	5	+9	6^{1}	RU^{2}	NH	–	–			
1994	2	20	11	6	3	28	15	+13	28^{3}	C	NH	–	–			Qingdao Tiantai Stadium
1995	1	22	5	7	10	20	32	−12	22	11	R1	DNQ	–		13,364	Qingdao Tiantai Stadium
1996	2	22	14	2	6	38	27	+11	44	RU	R2	DNQ	–			Qingdao Tiantai Stadium
1997	1	22	6	7	9	16	27	−11	25	9	R2	DNQ	–		10,545	
1998	1	26	8	8	10	24	30	−6	32	6	R2	DNQ	–		11,538	
1999	1	26	8	6	12	30	37	−7	30	10	R2	DNQ	–		12,192	Hongcheng Stadium
2000	1	26	6	11	9	22	29	−7	29	11	R1	DNQ	–		16,923	
2001	1	26	5	7	14	22	35	−13	22	13^{4}	QF	DNQ	–		15,308	Etsong Sports Center; Zibo Sports Center Stadium
2002	1	28	9	9	10	30	34	−4	36	8	C	RU	–		6,214	Etsong Sports Center
2003	1	28	10	5	13	40	50	−10	35	11	R16	DNQ	–		12,429	Etsong Sports Center
2004	1	22	4	9	9	21	28	−7	21	11^{4}	QF	NH	R1		4,645	Etsong Sports Center
2005	1	26	9	7	10	26	31	−5	34	7	R1	NH	QF		4,500	Etsong Sports Center
2006	1	28	6	7	15	25	36	−11	25	14	R1	NH	NH		6,071	Qingdao Tiantai Stadium
2007	1	28	10	6	12	36	42	−6	36	8	NH	NH	NH		7,179	Etsong Sports Center
2008	1	30	10	9	11	39	36	+3	39	8	NH	NH	NH		6,600	Qingdao Tiantai Stadium
2009	1	30	8	12	10	36	36	0	36	13	NH	NH	NH		8,774	Qingdao Tiantai Stadium
2010	1	30	6	12	12	31	44	−13	30	14	NH	NH	NH		6,247	Qingdao Tiantai Stadium
2011	1	30	12	9	9	37	33	+4	45	6	R1	DNQ	NH		8,464	Qingdao Tiantai Stadium
2012	1	30	10	6	14	26	34	−8	36	13	R4	DNQ	NH		9,538	Qingdao Tiantai Stadium
2013	1	30	7	10	13	26	41	−15	31	15	QF	DNQ	NH		8,284	Qingdao Tiantai Stadium
2014	2	30	15	8	7	43	29	14	46^{5}	5	R3	DNQ	NH		3,602	Qingdao Tiantai Stadium
2015	2	30	11	8	11	30	39	−9	41	7	R4	DNQ	NH		5,093	Qingdao Tiantai Stadium
2016	2	30	8	9	13	30	43	−13	33	15	R3	DNQ	NH		2,702	Qingdao Tiantai Stadium
2017	3	24	12	9	3	29	11	18	45	5	R2	DNQ	NH		762	Qingdao Tiantai Stadium
2018	3	28	16	3	9	44	29	15	51	8	R3	DNQ	NH		433	Qingdao Tiantai Stadium
2019	3	30	14	9	7	39	18	21	45^{6}	14	R4	DNQ	NH			Qingdao Tiantai Stadium
2020	3	9	4	4	1	14	7	7	16	6	DNQ	DNQ	NH			
2021	3	28	18	7	3	52	18	34	61	C	R1	DNQ	NH			
2022	2	34	23	7	4	77	24	53	76	RU	R2	DNQ	NH			
2023	1	30	7	7	16	34	45	-11	28	13	SF	DNQ	NH		17,945	Qingdao Youth Football Stadium

- ^Note 1: In final group stage. ^Note 2: No promotion. ^Note 3: 2 points each win. ^Note 4: No relegation.^5: Deducted 7 points.^6: Deducted 6 points.

Queen's Cup results

Season	1995
Results	3

Key

	China top division
	China second division
	China third division
C	Champions
RU	Runners-up
3	Third place
	Relegated

- Pld = Played
- W = Games won
- D = Games drawn
- L = Games lost
- F = Goals for
- A = Goals against
- Pts = Points
- Pos = Final position
- DNQ = Did not qualify
- DNE = Did not enter
- NH = Not Held
- - = Does Not Exist
- R1 = Round 1
- R2 = Round 2
- R3 = Round 3
- R4 = Round 4
- F = Final
- SF = Semi-finals
- QF = Quarter-finals
- R16 = Round of 16
- Group = Group stage
- GS2 = Second Group stage
- QR1 = First Qualifying Round
- QR2 = Second Qualifying Round
- QR3 = Third Qualifying Round

== All-time top scorers ==
Since 1994 the first professional league season. CFA Cup and CSL Cup are included. Correct as the end of season 2011.

	Name	Years	League	FA Cup	League Cup	Asia	Other	Total
1	(China) Qu Bo	2000–2009	51	3	3	0	0	57
2	(China) Jiang Ning	2004–2010	35	1	3	0	0	39
3	(China) Liu Jian	2004–2013	35	0	3	0	0	38
4	(China) Gao Ming	2000–2004	19	4	0	0	0	23
5	(China) Zheng Long	2007–2013	19	0	0	0	0	19
6	(China) Zuo Wenqing	1994,1996–1999	17	0	0	0	0	17
7	(Croatia) Dragan Vukoja	2002–2003	12	4	0	0	0	16
8	(China) Tang Lepu	1994–1996	14	0	0	0	0	14
9	(China) Fan Xuewei	1994–1999	13	0	0	0	0	13
10	(China) Jiao Chunben	1994–1999	12	0	0	0	0	12

=== Top league scorers each season ===
Since 1994 the first professional league season. Correct as of 2 July 2012.

Season	Top scorer	Goals
1994	(China) Fan Xuewei	7
1995	(China) Tang Lepu	6
1996	(China) Jiao Chunben (China) Tang Lepu (China) Zuo Wenqing (China) Ji Yujie	6
1997	(China) Zhang Jun	4
1998	(China) Cao Xiandong	6
1999	(Brazil) Gilberto William	7
2000	(China) Qu Bo	8
2001	(Brazil) Emerson	5
2002	(Croatia) Dragan Vukoja	8
2003	(China) Gao Ming	9
2004	(China) Sun Xinbo	5
2005	(China) Qu Bo (China) Jiang Ning	6
2006	(China) Jiang Ning	7
2007	(China) Liu Jian	8
2008	(Honduras) Mitchel Brown	7
2009	(China) Qu Bo	12
2010	(Slovenia) Aleksandar Rodić	8
2011	(China) Song Wenjie (China) Zhu Jianrong	6
2012	(Brazil) Bruno Meneghel	9
2013	(Brazil) Bruno Meneghel	10
2014	(Romania) Cristian Dănălache	10
2015	(Brazil) Reis	6
2016	(Honduras) Eddie Hernández	7

== Records ==
=== Team records ===
==== Matches ====
- First Jia-B League match: Shandong Economic and Trade Commission 3–0 Jiangsu, 17 January 1993
- First Professional League match: Qingdao Manatee 3–2 Henan Construction, 17 April 1994
- First Jia-A League match: Guangzhou Apollo 1–0 Qingdao Manatee, 16 April 1995
- First FA Cup match: Qingdao Manatee 0–1 Liaoning Dongyao, 25 June 1995
- First Super Cup match: Qingdao Etsong Hainiu 0–1 Dalian Shide, 6 February 2003
- First Super League match: Qingdao Etsong Hainiu 2–2 Shanghai International, 16 May 2004
- First League Cup match: Qingdao Etsong Hainiu 2–1 Liaoning Zhongyu, 2 June 2004

==== Record wins ====
- Record win: 6–1 v Chongqing Lifan, Super League, 8 August 2009
- Record League win: 6–1 v Chongqing Lifan, Super League, 8 August 2009
- Record Super League win: 6–1 v Chongqing Lifan, 8 August 2009
- Record FA Cup win: 4–0

v Guizhou Zhicheng, 27 June 2012

- Record League home win: 6–1 v Chongqing Lifan, Super League, 8 August 2009
- Record League away win: 5–1 v Changsha Ginde, Super League, 11 October 2008

==== Record defeats ====
- Record defeat: 0–7 v Chongqing Longxin, 30 May 1999
- Record League defeat: 0–5 v Yunnan Hongta, Jia-A League, 10 June 2001
- Record Super League defeat: 0–4

v Shandong Luneng, 22 August 2007
v Tianjin Teda, 8 September 2007
v Jiangsu Sainty, 22 August 2010

- Record FA Cup defeat: 0–7 v Chongqing Longxin, 30 May 1999
- Record League home defeat: 0–4 v Shandong Luneng, Super League, 22 August 2007
- Record League away defeat: 0–5 v Yunnan Hongta, Jia-A League, 10 June 2001

=== Player records ===
- Most goals in a season in all competition: 12 – Qu Bo, Super League, 2009
- Most League goals in a season: 12 – Qu Bo, Super League, 2009
- Top scorer with fewest goals in a season: 4 – Zhang Jun, Jia-A League, 1997
- Most goals scored in a match: 3 – Jiang Ning v Chongqing Lifan, 29 March 2006
- Fastest Goal: 20 seconds – Peng Weijun v Yunnan Hongta, 2 April 2000
- First hat-trick: Jiang Ning v Chongqing Lifan, 29 March 2006

== Notable players ==
Had international caps for their respective countries.

Asia

- (Uzbekistan) Ildar Magdeev
- (Uzbekistan) Aziz Ibragimov
- (Uzbekistan) Sherzod Karimov
- (Syria) George Mourad
- (Australia) Joel Griffiths
- (Chinese Taipei) Wang Chien-ming
- (China) Jiang Ning
- (China) Xu Yang
- (China) Zheng Long

Africa

- (South Africa) Mark Williams
- (Zambia) James Phiri
- (Zambia) Evans Kangwa
- (Nigeria) Benedict Akwuegbu
- (Burkina Faso) Abdoul-Aziz Nikiema
- (Burkina Faso) Adama Guira

Europe

- (Croatia) Miroslav Bičanić
- (Ukraine) Oleksandr Holovko
- (Slovenia) Aleksandar Rodić
- (Bosnia and Herzegovina) Ninoslav Milenković
- (Bosnia and Herzegovina) Elvis Sarić
- (Serbia) Aleksandar Andrejević

Central & North America

- (Honduras) Mitchel Brown
- (Honduras) Luis Santamaría
- (Costa Rica) Mauricio Castillo
- (Honduras) Osman Chávez
- (Honduras) Jorge Claros
- (Honduras) Eddie Hernández

South America

- (Uruguay) Adrián Paz
