= Zheng Chuanhui =

Chinese association footballer (born 2007)

Personal information
- Date of birth: 1 January 2007 (age 19)
- Height: 1.77 m (5 ft 10 in)
- Position: Midfielder

Team information
- Current team: Qingdao Hainiu
- Number: 47

Youth career
- 2017–2024: Qingdao Hainiu

Senior career*
Years	Team	Apps	(Gls)
2024–	Qingdao Hainiu	5	(0)

International career^{‡}
2019	China U12		
- * Club domestic league appearances and goals as of 27 July 2026 ‡ National team caps and goals as of 27 July 2026

Zheng Chuanhui (simplified Chinese: 郑传辉; traditional Chinese: 鄭傳輝; pinyin: Zhèng Chuánhuī; born 1 January 2007) is a Chinese professional footballer who plays as a midfielder for Chinese Super League club Qingdao Hainiu.

== Early life and youth career ==
Zheng was born on 1 January 2007. He began playing football in the first grade and was selected by coach Jiao Chunben to enter the Qingdao Hainiu youth system at age 10. He attended Tiantai City School in Chengyang District, where he excelled academically, ranking second in a grade of approximately 200 students. During his time at the school, he won the "District Chief Cup" and "Mayor's Cup" championships.

In 2019, Zheng was selected for the China U12 national youth team A squad. In 2020, he was selected for the National Youth Campus Football Summer Camp Best Squad (Junior High School Boys' Group B), ranking sixth in the selection, and received a first-level athlete certificate. In July 2021, he was selected for the 2007 and 2008 age group elite youth player training camp organized by the Chinese Football Association in Shanghai.

In 2021, Zheng represented Tiantai City School in the "Coca-Cola Mayor's Cup" campus football league junior high school division, scoring 20 goals and winning the tournament's Silver Boot award. In 2022, he participated in the Shanghai Rising Star Champions Cup as part of the national elite youth player training camp for the 2007 and 2008 age groups. In the same year, he captained the Qingdao City team to win the men's Group A championship at the 25th Shandong Provincial Games.

== Club career ==
=== Qingdao Hainiu ===
On 18 July 2024, Qingdao Hainiu Football Club officially announced that Zheng, along with youth teammates Huang Yinghao, Zhao Yi, and Han Chengzhi, had been promoted to the first team.

In the 2026 season, Zheng was named in Qingdao Hainiu's first-team squad for the Chinese Super League, wearing the number 47 jersey.

On 20 June 2026, in the fourth round of the Chinese FA Cup against Wuxi Wugou, Zheng scored his first career goal with a shot from outside the penalty area that deflected into the net. The match ended 2–2 after 90 minutes, and Qingdao Hainiu advanced 7–5 on penalties.

On 17 July 2026, in the 19th round of the Chinese Super League, Zheng made a substitute appearance in the 71st minute, replacing Malcom Edjouma, in a 1–5 away defeat to Henan.

== International career ==
In 2019, Zheng was selected for the China U12 national youth team A squad. In July 2021, he was selected for the Chinese Football Association's 2007 and 2008 age group elite youth player training camp in Shanghai.

== Career statistics ==
=== Club ===
As of 27 July 2026

Appearances and goals by club, season and competition
Club	Season	League			National Cup		Continental		Other		Total	
Club	Season	Division	Apps	Goals	Apps	Goals	Apps	Goals	Apps	Goals	Apps	Goals
Qingdao Hainiu	2026	Chinese Super League	4	0	1	1	—		—		5	0
Career total			4	0	1	1	0	0	0	0	5	0

== Honours ==
Qingdao City Team

- Shandong Provincial Games men's Group A: 2022
