= UD Gran Tarajal =

Association football club in Spain

Gran Tarajal
- Full name: Unión Deportiva Gran Tarajal Sociedad Tamasite
- Founded: 1925; 101 years ago
- Ground: Municipal, Gran Tarajal, Tuineje, Fuerteventura, Canary Islands, Spain
- Capacity: 3,000
- President: Ge Wenjun
- Manager: Maxi Barrera
- 2024–25: Interinsular Preferente, retired (relegated)
Home colours	Away colours

Unión Deportiva Gran Tarajal Sociedad Tamasite, or simply UD Gran Tarajal, is a Spanish football team based in Gran Tarajal, Tuineje, Fuerteventura, in the Canary Islands. Founded in 1925, the club holds home games at Estadio Municipal de Gran Tarajal, with a capacity of 3,000 people.

== Former players ==
- (China) Ge Wenjun - Current player/president of the club
- Yuan Yung-cheng - Taiwan youth international player

== Season to season ==
Season	Tier	Division	Place	Copa del Rey
1980–81	8	3ª Reg.	12th	
1981–82	7	2ª Reg.	8th	
1982–83	7	2ª Reg.	6th	
1983–84	7	2ª Reg.	9th	
1984–85	7	2ª Reg.	10th	
1985–86	6	1ª Reg.	3rd	
1986–87	6	1ª Reg.		
1987–88	6	1ª Reg.		
1988–89	6	1ª Reg.		
1989–90	5	Int. Pref.	17th	
1990–91	6	1ª Reg.		
1991–92	6	1ª Reg.		
1992–93	6	1ª Reg.	2nd	
1993–94	6	1ª Reg.	2nd	
1994–95	6	1ª Reg.	6th	
1995–96	6	1ª Reg.	2nd	
1996–97	6	1ª Reg.	2nd	
1997–98	6	1ª Reg.		
1998–99	6	1ª Reg.	2nd	
1999–2000	6	1ª Reg.	1th	

Season	Tier	Division	Place	Copa del Rey
2000–01	5	Int. Pref.	4th	
2001–02	5	Int. Pref.	7th	
2002–03	5	Int. Pref.	6th	
2003–04	5	Int. Pref.	12th	
2004–05	5	Int. Pref.	15th	
2005–06	6	1ª Reg.	1st	
2006–07	5	Int. Pref.	16th	
2007–08	6	1ª Reg.	5th	
2008–09	6	1ª Reg.	5th	
2009–10	6	1ª Reg.	5th	
2010–11	6	1ª Reg.	5th	
2011–12	6	1ª Reg.	3rd	
2012–13	6	1ª Reg.	6th	
2013–14	6	1ª Reg.	3rd	
2014–15	6	1ª Reg.	6th	
2015–16	6	1ª Reg.	3rd	
2016–17	6	1ª Reg.	2nd	
2017–18	6	1ª Reg.	1st	
2018–19	5	Int. Pref.	1st	
2019–20	4	3ª	9th	Preliminary

Season	Tier	Division	Place	Copa del Rey
2020–21	4	3ª	4th	
2021–22	5	3ª RFEF	7th	
2022–23	5	3ª Fed.	15th	
2023–24	5	3ª Fed.	17th	
2024–25	6	Int. Pref.	(R)	

- 2 seasons in Tercera División
- 3 seasons in Tercera Federación/Tercera División RFEF
