= CF Talavera de la Reina =

Spanish association football club

Coordinates: 39.965634°N 4.821903°W

Talavera
- Full name: Club de Fútbol Talavera de la Reina
- Founded: 2011; 15 years ago
- Stadium: Estadio El Prado
- Capacity: 5,000
- President: Iván Fernández Grajera
- Head coach: Pedro Díaz
- League: Segunda Federación – Group 5
- 2025–26: Primera Federación – Group 1, 16th of 20 (relegated)
Home colours	Away colours

Club de Fútbol Talavera de la Reina is a Spanish football club based in Talavera de la Reina, in the autonomous community of Castilla–La Mancha.

Founded in 2011 after the merge of CF Talavera and Real Talavera CD, it plays soon in Segunda Federación – Group 5, holding home matches at Estadio El Prado, with a 5,000-seat capacity.

== History ==
In 2011, Club de Fútbol Talavera de la Reina was founded by the merger of two clubs, CF Talavera and Real Talavera CD. (Note: CF Talavera was (since 2010) the new name of CD San Prudencio. Real Talavera CD had been founded in 2010.)

The club won Tercera División, Group 18 in the 2016–2017 season and was promoted to Segunda División B.

At the end 2021–22 season, Talavera was relegated to the new fourth division, Segunda División RFEF. But 3 months later, Talavera took the place of Internacional de Madrid in the third division, after the latter had resigned from the competition due to economic problems.

After two seasons in Segunda RFEF/Segunda Federación, the team won promotion to Primera Federación in June 2025. The club stayed one season and was relegated back to Segunda Federación

== Season to season ==
Season	Tier	Division	Place	Copa del Rey
2011–12	5	1ª Aut.	2nd	
2012–13	4	3ª	4th	
2013–14	4	3ª	5th	
2014–15	4	3ª	1st	
2015–16	3	2ª B	18th	Second round
2016–17	4	3ª	1st	
2017–18	3	2ª B	7th	Third round
2018–19	3	2ª B	9th	First round
2019–20	3	2ª B	17th	
2020–21	3	2ª B	3rd / 6th	
2021–22	3	1ª RFEF	16th	Second round
2022–23	3	1ª Fed.	20th	
2023–24	4	2ª Fed.	9th	First round
2024–25	4	2ª Fed.	3rd	
2025–26	3	1ª Fed.	16th	Round of 32
2026-27	4	2ª Fed.		

- 3 seasons in Primera Federación/Primera División RFEF
- 5 seasons in Segunda División B
- 3 seasons in Segunda Federación
- 4 seasons in Tercera División

== Current squad ==
As of 5 February 2026.

Note: Flags indicate national team as defined under FIFA eligibility rules; some limited exceptions apply. Players may hold more than one non-FIFA nationality.

No.	Pos.	Nation	Player
1	GK	ESP	Jaime González
2	DF	ESP	David Cuenca
3	DF	ESP	Aleix Roig
4	DF	ESP	Álvaro López
5	DF	ESP	Sergi Molina
6	MF	ESP	Pitu Doncel
7	FW	ARG	Gonzalo Di Renzo
8	MF	ESP	Luis Sánchez
9	FW	ESP	Marcos Moreno (on loan from Albacete)
11	FW	ESP	Edu Gallardo
13	GK	ESP	Javier Belman

No.	Pos.	Nation	Player
14	MF	ESP	Arturo Molina
15	MF	ESP	Luis Acosta
16	MF	ESP	Isaiah Navarro
17	DF	MAR	Bilal Ouacharaf
18	MF	ESP	Pedro Capó
19	FW	ESP	Valen
20	FW	ESP	Ferni
21	MF	ESP	Sergio Montero
23	DF	ESP	Manuel Farrando
24	FW	MAR	Nordin Al Lal (on loan from Elche B)

== See also ==
- CF Talavera de la Reina B, reserve team
- Talavera CF
