= Parrillas =

Coordinates: 40°04′N 5°03′W

- municipality
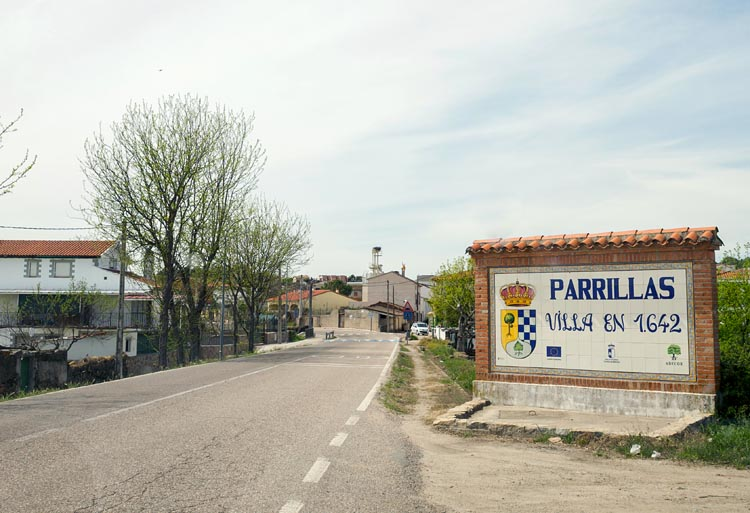
- Entrance to Parrillas Municipal

- Flag Coat of arms
- Interactive map of Parrillas
- Country: Spain
- Autonomous community: Castile-La Mancha
- Province: Toledo
- Municipality: Parrillas

Area
  - Total: 51 km^{2} (20 sq mi)
- Elevation: 800 m (2,600 ft)

Population (2025-01-01)
  - Total: 323
  - Density: 6.3/km^{2} (16/sq mi)
- Time zone: UTC+1 (CET)
  - Summer (DST): UTC+2 (CEST)

Parrillas is a municipality located in the province of Toledo, Castile-La Mancha, Spain. At the 2006 census (INE), the municipality had a population of 410 inhabitants.
