= Montehermoso =

Montehermoso, Spain
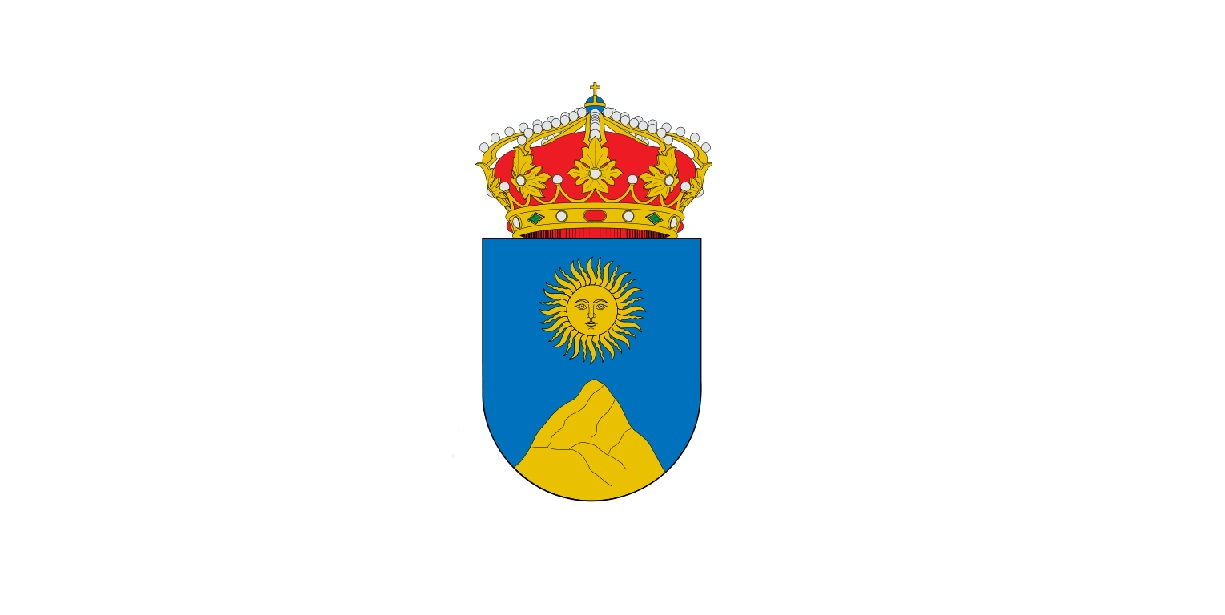
- Flag Coat of arms
- Interactive map of Montehermoso, Spain
- Coordinates: 40°05′N 6°20′W
- Country: Spain
- Autonomous community: Extremadura
- Province: Cáceres
- Municipality: Montehermoso

Area
  - Total: 96 km^{2} (37 sq mi)
- Elevation: 394 m (1,293 ft)

Population (2025-01-01)
  - Total: 5,552
  - Density: 58/km^{2} (150/sq mi)
- Time zone: UTC+1 (CET)
- Website: http://www.montehermoso.org/

Montehermoso (Spanish: [monteˈeɾmoso]) is a municipality located in the province of Cáceres, Extremadura, Spain. According to the 2006 census (INE), the municipality has a population of 5668 inhabitants.

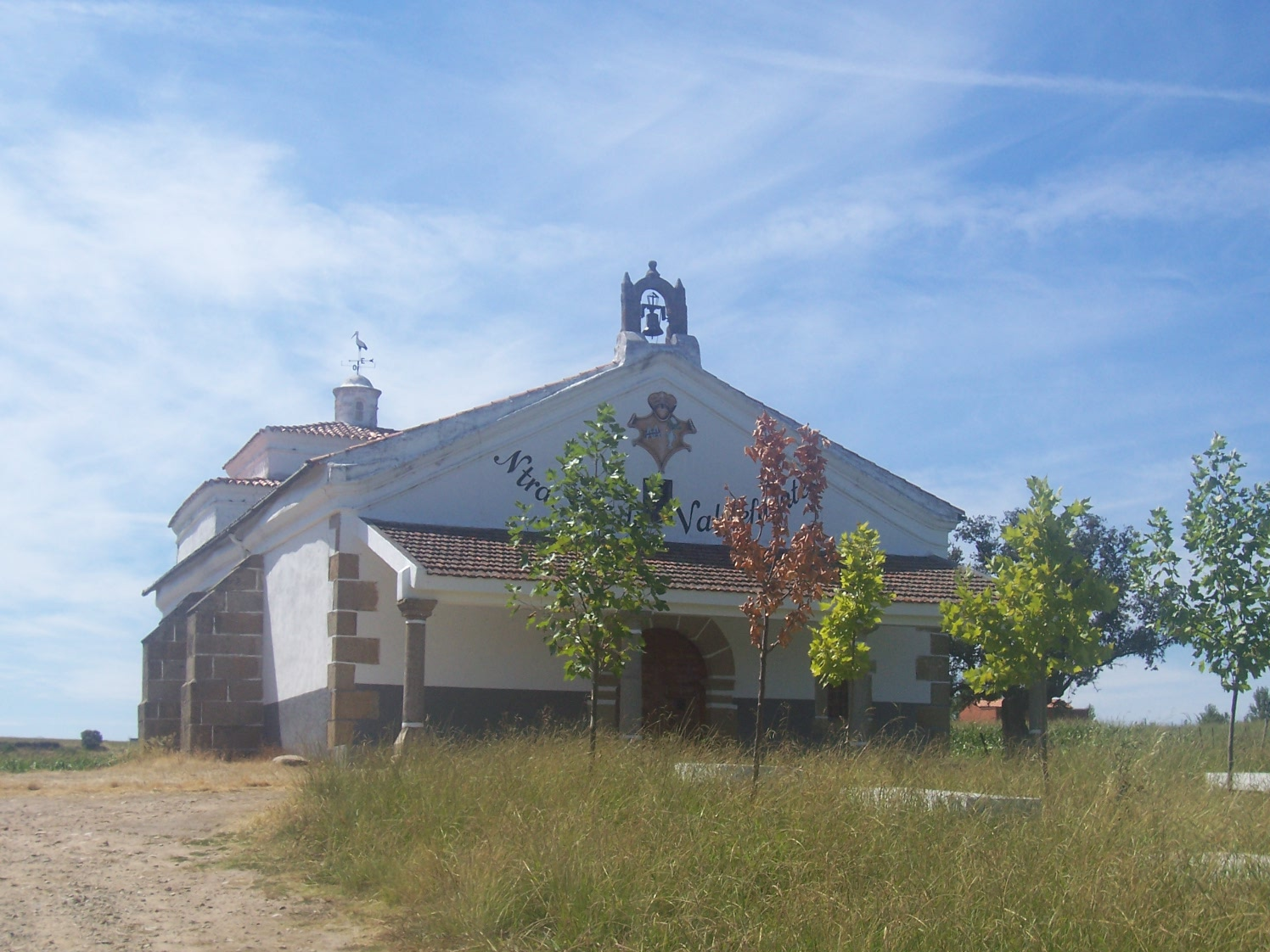
Hermitage of Our Lady of Valdefuentes, in Montehermoso, Cáceres, Spain

== See also ==
- List of municipalities in Cáceres
