= CF Talavera de la Reina B =

Spanish association football club

Talavera B
- Full name: Club de Fútbol Talavera de la Reina "B"
- Founded: 2011
- Ground: Diego Mateo "Zarra", Talavera de la Reina, Castilla–La Mancha, Spain
- Capacity: 500
- President: Josué Blázquez
- Head coach: Luis Quintas
- League: Primera Autonómica Preferente – Group 2
- 2024–25: Primera Autonómica Preferente – Group 2, 4th of 18
Home colours	Away colours

Club de Fútbol Talavera de la Reina "B" is a Spanish football club based in Talavera de la Reina, in the autonomous community of Castilla–La Mancha. Founded in 2011, they are the reserve team of CF Talavera de la Reina, and play in Primera Autonómica Preferente – Group 2.

== History ==
CF Talavera de la Reina was founded after a merger of CF Talavera and Real Talavera CD; with the first team taking the place of the former in Primera Autonomica Preferente, the B-side took the latter's place in Primera Autonómica. The reserve team played two seasons before going into inactivity and only returning in 2018, but again featuring in just one campaign.

In 2020, Talavera B returned to an active status after the club absorbed Talavera FD; the B-team immediately started in their place in Primera Autonomica Preferente. In May 2022, the side achieved a first-ever promotion to Tercera Federación.

== Season to season ==
Season	Tier	Division	Place
2011–12	6	1ª Aut.	9th
2012–13	6	1ª Aut.	5th
2013–2018	DNP		
2018–19	7	2ª Aut.	12th
2019–20	DNP		
2020–21	5	1ª Aut.	2nd
2021–22	6	1ª Aut.	1st
2022–23	5	3ª Fed.	16th
2023–24	6	1ª Aut.	4th
2024–25	6	1ª Aut.	14th
2025–26	6	1ª Aut.	

- 1 season in Tercera Federación
