= Racing Rioja CF =

Spanish association football club

Racing Rioja
- Full name: Racing Rioja Club de Fútbol
- Founded: 2018
- Dissolved: 2024
- Ground: El Salvador; Logroño, La Rioja, Spain
- Capacity: 1,160
- Chairman: José Coelho
- Manager: Óscar Sáenz
- 2023–24: Tercera Federación – Group 16, 12th of 18
Home colours	Away colours

Racing Rioja Club de Fútbol was a football club based in Logroño, La Rioja. Founded in 2018 and dissolved in 2024, they held home games at the Campo de Fútbol El Salvador, with a capacity of 1,160 people.

== History ==
Founded in 2018, the club submitted their registration to the La Rioja Football Federation in August of that year, immediately entering in the Regional Preferente. In their second season, the club won promotion to Tercera División after finishing first in the first tier, also assuring a Copa del Rey berth.

In the 2020–21 Copa del Rey, Racing Rioja qualified to the first round, but was knocked out by La Liga side SD Eibar. At the end of the 2023–24 Tercera Federación, the club dissolved after it could not pay their debts with the Association of Spanish Footballers (AFE).

== Season to season ==
Season	Tier	Division	Place	Copa del Rey
2018–19	5	Reg. Pref.	7th	
2019–20	5	Reg. Pref.	1st	
2020–21	4	3ª	1st / 1st	First round
2021–22	4	2ª RFEF	7th	First round
2022–23	4	2ª Fed.	17th	First round
2023–24	5	3ª Fed.	12th	

- 2 seasons in Segunda Federación/Segunda División RFEF
- 1 season in Tercera División
- 1 season in Tercera Federación

== Former players ==
- Yuan Yung-cheng – Taiwan youth international player

== See also ==
- Racing Rioja CF B, reserve team
