= Villafranca, Navarre =

Villafranca
- Municipality
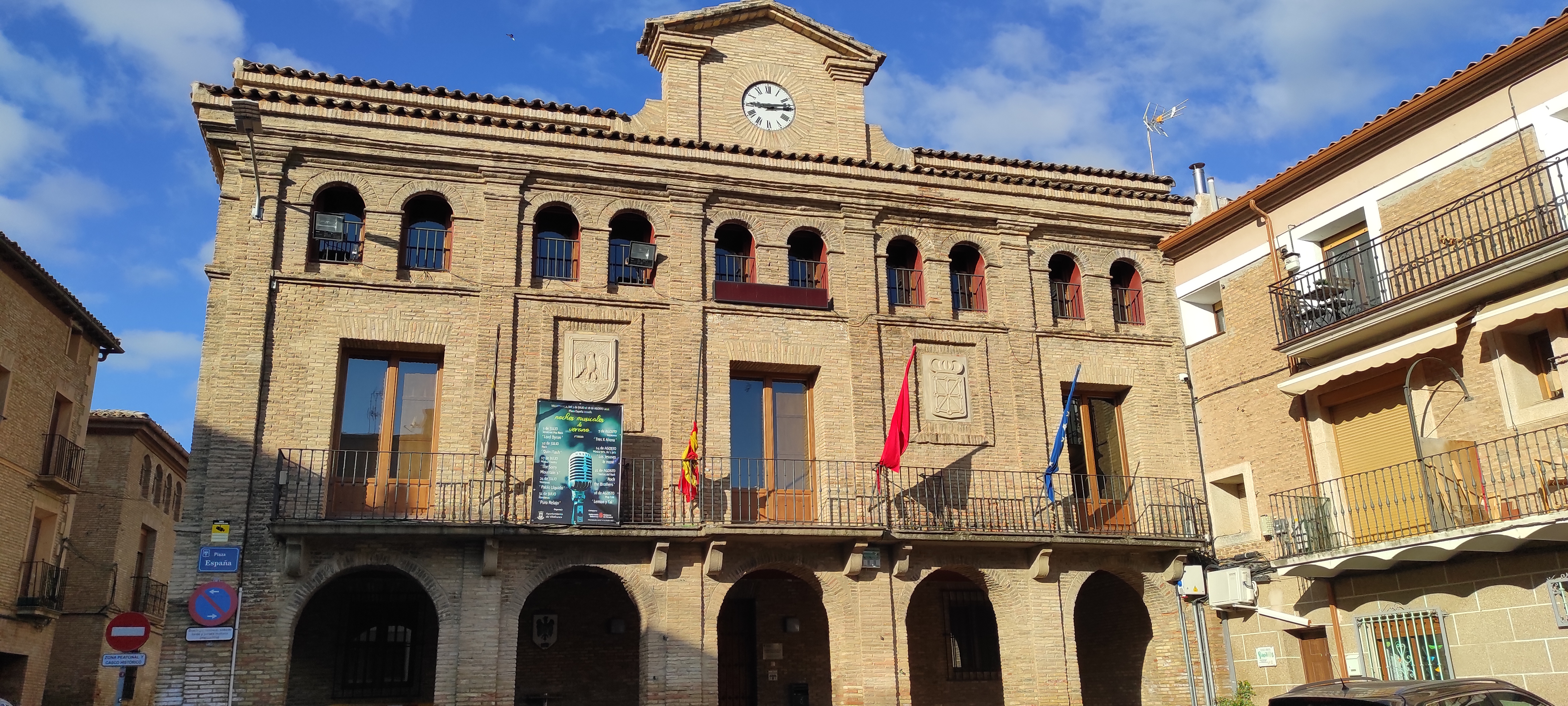
- Town hall

- Flag Coat of arms

- Location in Spain
- Coordinates: 42°16′59″N 1°45′0″W
- Country: Spain
- Autonomous community: Navarre
- Province: Navarre
- Comarca: Ribera de Navarra

Government
  - Mayor: María del Carmen Segura Moreno

Area
  - Total: 46.43 km^{2} (17.93 sq mi)
- Elevation: 291 m (955 ft)

Population (2025-01-01)
  - Total: 3,163
  - Density: 68.12/km^{2} (176.4/sq mi)
- Demonym: Villafranquéses
- Time zone: UTC+1 (CET)
  - Summer (DST): UTC+2 (CEST)
- Postal code: 31330
- Dialing code: 948
- Website: Official website

Villafranca (Basque: Alesbes) is a town and municipality located in the province and the autonomous community (Comunidad Foral) of Navarre, northern Spain.
