= Racing Rioja CF B =

Spanish association football club

Racing Rioja B
- Full name: Racing Rioja Club de Fútbol "B"
- Founded: 2020
- Dissolved: 2023
- Ground: El Salvador; Logroño, La Rioja, Spain
- Capacity: 1,160
- Chairman: José Coelho
- 2022–23: Tercera Federación – Group 16, 16th of 16 (relegated)
Home colours	Away colours

Racing Rioja Club de Fútbol "B" was a football club based in Logroño, La Rioja. Founded in 2020 and dissolved in 2023, they were the reserve team of Racing Rioja CF, and held home games at the Campo de Fútbol El Salvador, with a capacity of 1,160 people.

== History ==
In August 2020, shortly after the promotion of Racing Rioja CF to Tercera División, the club established a reserve team to play in the Regional Preferente. In May 2022, the club achieved a first-ever promotion to Tercera Federación.

Immediately relegated back, Racing Rioja B was subsequently dissolved after the club opted to not continue with a reserve squad. One year later, the club ceased activities entirely.

== Season to season ==
Season	Tier	Division	Place
2020–21	5	Reg. Pref.	14th
2021–22	6	Reg. Pref.	6th
2022–23	5	3ª Fed.	16th

- 1 season in Tercera Federación
