= 2019–20 Extremadura UD season =

Extremadura UD
2019–20 season
- President: Manuel Franganillo
- Head coach: Manuel Mosquera
- Stadium: Francisco de la Hera
- Segunda División: 21st (relegated)
- Copa del Rey: Second round
- Top goalscorer: League: Álex Alegría; Nono (6 goals each); All: Álex Alegría; Nono (6 goals each)
| Home colours | Away colours | Third colours |

The 2019–20 season was Extremadura Unión Deportiva's 13th season in existence and the club's second consecutive season in the second division of Spanish football. In addition to the domestic league, Extremadura participated in this season's edition of the Copa del Rey. The season was slated to cover a period from 1 July 2019 to 30 June 2020. It was extended extraordinarily beyond 30 June due to the COVID-19 pandemic in Spain.

== Players ==
=== Current squad ===
As of 19 February 2020

Note: Flags indicate national team as defined under FIFA eligibility rules; some limited exceptions apply. Players may hold more than one non-FIFA nationality.

| No. | Pos. | Nation | Player |
|---|---|---|---|
| 1 | GK | ESP | Casto |
| 2 | DF | ESP | Álex Díez |
| 4 | DF | ESP | Ángel Bastos |
| 5 | DF | ESP | Fran Cruz |
| 6 | DF | ESP | José Pardo |
| 7 | MF | CHN | Gao Leilei |
| 8 | MF | URU | Gio Zarfino (captain) |
| 9 | FW | ESP | Álex Alegría (on loan from Mallorca) |
| 10 | FW | ESP | Kike Márquez |
| 11 | FW | ESP | Airam Cabrera |
| 12 | MF | ESP | Borja Granero |

| No. | Pos. | Nation | Player |
|---|---|---|---|
| 14 | MF | ESP | Nono |
| 15 | MF | ESP | Cristian Rodríguez |
| 16 | FW | ESP | Pinchi |
| 17 | MF | ESP | Víctor Pastrana |
| 20 | MF | ESP | Roberto Olabe (on loan from Eibar) |
| 21 | MF | ESP | Sergio Gil |
| 22 | MF | ESP | David Rocha |
| 23 | FW | ESP | Álex López (on loan from Mallorca) |
| 28 | GK | JPN | Louis Yamaguchi |
| 30 | MF | GHA | Emmanuel Lomotey |
| 40 | GK | CHI | Gonzalo Collao |

=== Other players under contract ===
Note: Flags indicate national team as defined under FIFA eligibility rules; some limited exceptions apply. Players may hold more than one non-FIFA nationality.

| No. | Pos. | Nation | Player |
|---|---|---|---|
| — | DF | GRE | Haris Stamboulidis |

=== Reserve team ===
Note: Flags indicate national team as defined under FIFA eligibility rules; some limited exceptions apply. Players may hold more than one non-FIFA nationality.

| No. | Pos. | Nation | Player |
|---|---|---|---|
| 26 | MF | ESP | Samu Manchón |
| 31 | GK | COL | Mike Cordero |
| 34 | DF | URU | Gabri |
| 37 | DF | ESP | Kike Carrasco |

| No. | Pos. | Nation | Player |
|---|---|---|---|
| 42 | FW | ESP | Lele |
| 44 | FW | ESP | Manu Mosquera |
| 45 | MF | GHA | Sabit Abdulai |

=== Out on loan ===
Note: Flags indicate national team as defined under FIFA eligibility rules; some limited exceptions apply. Players may hold more than one non-FIFA nationality.

| No. | Pos. | Nation | Player |
|---|---|---|---|
| — | DF | ESP | Borja García (at Recreativo until 30 June 2020) |
| — | DF | BRA | Bruno Perone (at Hércules until 30 June 2020) |

| No. | Pos. | Nation | Player |
|---|---|---|---|
| — | MF | ESP | José García (at Pontevedra until 30 June 2020) |
| — | MF | CIV | Liam Ayad (at Ebro until 30 June 2020) |

== Competitions ==
=== Overview ===
| Competition | First match | Last match | Starting round | Final position | Record | | | | | | | |
| Competition | First match | Last match | Starting round | Final position | Pld | W | D | L | GF | GA | GD | Win % |
|---|---|---|---|---|---|---|---|---|---|---|---|---|
| Segunda División | 17 August 2019 | 20 July 2020 | Matchday 1 | 21st | 42 | 10 | 13 | 19 | 43 | 59 | −16 | 23.81 |
| Copa del Rey | 17 December 2019 | 11 January 2020 | First round | Second round | 1 | 0 | 0 | 1 | 0 | 1 | −1 | 0.00 |
| Total | | | | | 43 | 10 | 13 | 20 | 43 | 60 | −17 | 23.26 |

Last updated: 20 July 2020
Source: Competitions

=== Segunda División ===
==== League table ====
| Pos | Team | Pld | W | D | L | GF | GA | GD | Pts | Promotion, qualification or relegation |
|---|---|---|---|---|---|---|---|---|---|---|
| 18 | Ponferradina | 42 | 12 | 15 | 15 | 45 | 50 | −5 | 51 (Note: Ponferradina finished ahead of Deportivo La Coruña on head-to-head goal difference: Ponferradina 2–0 Deportivo La Coruña, Deportivo La Coruña 2–1 Ponferradina.) | |
| 19 | Deportivo La Coruña (R) | 42 | 12 | 15 | 15 | 43 | 60 | −17 | 51 | Relegation to Segunda División B |
| 20 | Numancia (R) | 42 | 13 | 11 | 18 | 45 | 53 | −8 | 50 | Relegation to Segunda División B |
| 21 | Extremadura (R) | 42 | 10 | 13 | 19 | 43 | 59 | −16 | 43 | Relegation to Segunda División B |
| 22 | Racing Santander (R) | 42 | 5 | 18 | 19 | 39 | 56 | −17 | 33 | Relegation to Segunda División B |

Source: LaLiga Soccerway
Rules for classification: 1) points; 2) head-to-head points; 3) head-to-head goal difference; 4) goal difference; 5) number of goals scored
(R) Relegated

==== Results summary ====
| Overall | | | | | | | | Home | | | | | | Away | | | | | |
| Pld | W | D | L | GF | GA | GD | Pts | W | D | L | GF | GA | GD | W | D | L | GF | GA | GD |
|---|---|---|---|---|---|---|---|---|---|---|---|---|---|---|---|---|---|---|---|
| 42 | 10 | 13 | 19 | 43 | 59 | −16 | 43 | 6 | 4 | 11 | 21 | 26 | −5 | 4 | 9 | 8 | 22 | 33 | −11 |

Last updated: 20 July 2020.
Source: La Liga SmartBank

==== Results by round ====
| Round | 1 | 2 | 3 | 4 | 5 | 6 | 7 | 8 | 9 | 10 | 11 | 12 | 13 | 14 | 15 | 16 | 17 | 18 | 19 | 20 | 21 | 22 | 23 | 24 | 25 | 26 | 27 | 28 | 29 | 30 | 31 | 32 | 33 | 34 | 35 | 36 | 37 | 38 | 39 | 40 | 41 | 42 |
|---|---|---|---|---|---|---|---|---|---|---|---|---|---|---|---|---|---|---|---|---|---|---|---|---|---|---|---|---|---|---|---|---|---|---|---|---|---|---|---|---|---|---|
| Ground | A | H | A | H | A | H | A | H | A | H | H | A | H | A | H | A | H | A | H | A | H | A | H | A | H | A | A | H | A | H | H | A | H | A | H | A | H | A | H | A | H | A |
| Result | D | L | L | D | L | D | L | W | W | W | D | L | L | L | L | W | L | L | D | D | W | D | L | L | D | W | L | D | W | D | L | D | L | D | L | D | W | L | L | W | W | L |
| Position | 13 | 17 | 21 | 21 | 21 | 21 | 21 | 21 | 16 | 13 | 14 | 17 | 19 | 20 | 20 | 17 | 20 | 21 | 21 | 20 | 19 | 19 | 19 | 21 | 21 | 20 | 20 | 21 | 20 | 21 | 21 | 21 | 21 | 21 | 21 | 21 | 21 | 21 | 21 | 21 | 21 | 21 |

Updated to match(es) played on 20 July 2020. Source: La Liga SmartBank
A = Away; H = Home; W = Win; D = Draw; L = Loss

==== Matches ====
The fixtures were revealed on 4 July 2019.

| 17 August 2019 1 | Lugo | 0–0 | Extremadura | Lugo |
| 18:00 CEST (UTC+2) | Seoane (yellow card) 90' | Summary | Pinchi (yellow card) 82' | Stadium: Estadio Anxo Carro; Attendance: 2,868; Referee: Víctor Areces Franco |

| 25 August 2019 2 | Extremadura | 1–2 | Fuenlabrada | Almendralejo |
| 21:00 CEST (UTC+2) | Zarfino (yellow card) 39'; Nono 56' | Summary | Hugo Fraile 10' (pen.) (yellow card) 22'; Antonio Cristian (yellow card) 27' (goal) 88'; Mikel Iribas (yellow card) 33'; Cristóbal (yellow card) 36' | Stadium: Francisco de la Hera; Attendance: 6,422; Referee: Rubén Ávalos Barrera |

| 1 September 2019 3 | Cádiz | 2–1 | Extremadura | Cádiz |
| 21:00 CEST (UTC+2) | Bodiger (yellow card) 8'; Álex 32'; Fali (yellow card) 43'; José Mari (yellow card) 83'; Jon Ander Garrido 90+4' | Summary | Álex Díez (yellow card) 23'; Zarfino 54' (yellow card) 72' | Stadium: Estadio Ramón de Carranza; Attendance: 15,415; Referee: Aitor Gorostegui Fernández |

| 7 September 2019 4 | Extremadura | 0–0 | Numancia | Almendralejo |
| 20:00 CEST (UTC+2) | Pinchi (yellow card) 78' | Summary | Carlos Gutiérrez (yellow card) 36' (yellow-red card) 89'; Iván Calero (yellow card) 66' (yellow-red card) 86' | Stadium: Francisco de la Hera; Attendance: 5,596; Referee: Iñaki Vicandi Garrido |

| 15 September 2019 5 | Zaragoza | 3–1 | Extremadura | Zaragoza |
| CEST (UTC+2) | Dwamena 12'; Kagawa 80'; Suárez 86' | Report | Caballo 54' | Stadium: La Romareda; Attendance: 25,799; Referee: Jon Ander González Esteban |

| 19 September 2019 6 | Oviedo | 1–1 | Extremadura | Oviedo |
| CEST (UTC+2) | Fernández (yellow card) 16'; Arribas (yellow card) 28'; Cortina (yellow card) 38'; Ortuño 85' | Report | Zarfino (yellow card) 39'; Rocha (yellow card) 68'; Kike 70'; Casto (yellow card) 80'; Cruz (yellow card) 90+1' | Stadium: Estadio Carlos Tartiere; Attendance: 10624; Referee: Iosu Galech |

| 22 September 2019 7 | Extremadura | 0–1 | Huesca | Almendralejo |
| CEST (UTC+2) | Zarfino (yellow card) 78' | Report | Pulido (yellow card) 14'; Juan Carlos 22'; Mosquera (yellow card) 28'; Luisinho (yellow card) 73'; Josué Sá (yellow card) 85' | Stadium: Francisco de la Hera; Attendance: 6278; Referee: Juan Pulido |

| 28 September 2019 8 | Alcorcón | 0–2 | Extremadura | Alcorcón |
| CEST (UTC+2) | Dani Romera (yellow card) 35'; Bellvís (yellow card) 86' (yellow-red card) 90' | Report | Álex López (yellow card) 9'; Caballo (yellow card) 56'; Cruz 60'; Casto (yellow card) 73'; Caballo (yellow card) 56'; Kike 90+1' (pen.) | Stadium: Santo Domingo; Attendance: 2667; Referee: Santiago Varón |

| 1 October 2019 9 | Extremadura | 2–0 | Elche | Almendralejo |
| CEST (UTC+2) | Ledesma (yellow card) 44' (goal) 52'; Rocha (yellow card) 57'; Rodríguez 83' | Report | Sánchez (yellow card) 32' (yellow-red card) 51'; Medina (yellow card) 90'; Cruz (yellow card) 90+2' | Stadium: Francisco de la Hera; Attendance: 6422; Referee: Alejandro Muñiz |

| 5 October 2019 10 | Tenerife | 1–2 | Extremadura | Santa Cruz de Tenerife |
| CEST (UTC+2) | | | | Stadium: Estadio Heliodoro Rodríguez López |

| 12 October 2019 11 | Extremadura | 1–1 | Ponferradina | Almendralejo |
| CEST (UTC+2) | | | | Stadium: Francisco de la Hera |

| 19 October 2019 12 | Extremadura | 0–3 | Rayo Vallecano | Almendralejo |
| CEST (UTC+2) | | | | Stadium: Francisco de la Hera |

| 27 October 2019 13 | Almería | 3–2 | Extremadura | Almería |
| CET (UTC+1) | | | | Stadium: Estadio de los Juegos Mediterráneos |

| 3 November 2019 14 | Extremadura | 1–3 | Girona | Almendralejo |
| CET (UTC+1) | | | | Stadium: Francisco de la Hera |

| 9 November 2019 15 | Mirandés | 2–0 | Extremadura | Miranda de Ebro |
| CET (UTC+1) | | | | Stadium: Estadio Municipal de Anduva |

| 16 November 2019 16 | Extremadura | 2–0 | Deportivo La Coruña | Almendralejo |
| CET (UTC+1) | | | | Stadium: Francisco de la Hera |

| 23 November 2019 17 | Racing Santander | 3–0 | Extremadura | Santander |
| 18:00 CET (UTC+1) | Cejudo 29'; Yoda 70'; Lombardo 86' | Report | | Stadium: El Sardinero; Attendance: 9,875; Referee: Luis Mario Milla Alvendiz |

| 1 December 2019 18 | Extremadura | 0–1 | Las Palmas | Almendralejo |
| CET (UTC+1) | | | | Stadium: Francisco de la Hera |

| 6 December 2019 19 | Albacete | 1–1 | Extremadura | Albacete |
| CET (UTC+1) | | | | Stadium: Estadio Carlos Belmonte |

| 15 December 2019 20 | Extremadura | 0–0 | Málaga | Almendralejo |
| CET (UTC+1) | | | | Stadium: Francisco de la Hera |

| 21 December 2019 21 | Sporting Gijón | 0–1 | Extremadura | Gijón |
| CET (UTC+1) | | | | Stadium: El Molinón |

| 3 January 2020 22 | Extremadura | 0–0 | Alcorcón | Almendralejo |
| CET (UTC+1) | | | | Stadium: Francisco de la Hera |

| 16 January 2020 23 | Girona | 3–1 | Extremadura | Girona |
| CET (UTC+1) | | | | Stadium: Montilivi |

| 19 January 2020 24 | Extremadura | 1–2 | Almería | Almendralejo |
| CET (UTC+1) | | | | Stadium: Francisco de la Hera |

| 26 January 2020 25 | Rayo Vallecano | 1–1 | Extremadura | Madrid |
| CET (UTC+1) | | | | Stadium: Vallecas |

| 1 February 2020 26 | Extremadura | 1–0 | Lugo | Almendralejo |
| CET (UTC+1) | | | | Stadium: Francisco de la Hera |

| 8 February 2020 27 | Extremadura | 2–4 | Tenerife | Almendralejo |
| CET (UTC+1) | | | | Stadium: Francisco de la Hera |

| 16 February 2020 28 | Ponferradina | 0–0 | Extremadura | Ponferrada |
| CET (UTC+1) | | | | Stadium: Estadio El Toralín |

| 23 February 2020 29 | Extremadura | 3–2 | Mirandés | Almendralejo |
| CET (UTC+1) | | | | Stadium: Francisco de la Hera |

| 29 February 2020 30 | Huesca | 2–2 | Extremadura | Huesca |
| CET (UTC+1) | | | | Stadium: El Alcoraz |

| 7 March 2020 31 | Extremadura | 1–2 | Oviedo | Almendralejo |
| CET (UTC+1) | | | | Stadium: Francisco de la Hera |

| 12 June 2020 32 | Elche | 1–1 | Extremadura | Elche |
| CEST (UTC+2) | | | | Stadium: Estadio Manuel Martínez Valero |

| 17 June 2020 33 | Extremadura | 0–1 | Albacete | Almendralejo |
| CEST (UTC+2) | | | | Stadium: Francisco de la Hera |

| 20 June 2020 34 | Málaga | 1–1 | Extremadura | Málaga |
| CEST (UTC+2) | | | | Stadium: La Rosaleda |

| 23 June 2020 35 | Extremadura | 1–2 | Zaragoza | Almendralejo |
| CEST (UTC+2) | Alegría 8'; Nono (yellow card) 29' (yellow-red card) 86'; Zarfino (yellow card) 89' | Report | Guti 24'; Suárez 53'; Kagawa (yellow card) 88'; Zapater (yellow card) 90+5' | Stadium: Francisco de la Hera; Attendance: 0 Referee: Óliver de la Fuente Ramos |

| 28 June 2020 36 | Fuenlabrada | 1–1 | Extremadura | Fuenlabrada |
| CEST (UTC+2) | | | | Stadium: Fernando Torres |

| 1 July 2020 37 | Extremadura | 3–1 | Racing Santander | Almendralejo |
| 21:45 CEST (UTC+2) | Pinchi 39'; Rocha 49' (pen.); Zarfino 63' | Report | Guillermo 75' | Stadium: Francisco de la Hera; Attendance: 0 Referee: Santiago Varón Aceitón |

| 4 July 2020 38 | Numancia | 1–0 | Extremadura | Soria |
| CEST (UTC+2) | | | | Stadium: Los Pajaritos |

| 7 July 2020 39 | Extremadura | 0–1 | Cádiz | Almendralejo |
| CEST (UTC+2) | | Report | Lozano 23' | Stadium: Francisco de la Hera; Attendance: 0 Referee: Miguel Ángel Ortiz Arias |

| 12 July 2020 40 | Deportivo La Coruña | 2–3 | Extremadura | A Coruña |
| 17:00 CEST (UTC+2) | Simón 4'; Santos 89' | Report | Rodríguez (yellow card) 14'; Montero 68' (o.g.); Pinchi 84', 90+2'; Carrasco (yellow card) 88' | Stadium: Abanca-Riazor; Attendance: 0 Referee: Dámaso Arcediano Monescillo |

| 17 July 2020 39 | Extremadura | 2–0 | Sporting Gijón | Almendralejo |
| 21:00 CEST (UTC+2) | | | | Stadium: Francisco de la Hera |

| 20 July 2020 42 | Las Palmas | 5–1 | Extremadura | Las Palmas |
| 21:00 CEST (UTC+2) | | | | Stadium: Gran Canaria |

=== Copa del Rey ===
| 17 December 2019 First Round | Portugalete | 1–0 | Extremadura | Portugalete |
| 20:00 | Ander Santamaria (yellow card) 51'; Adrián Güemes (yellow card) 53' (goal) 68'; Bittor (yellow card) 90' | | Diego Caballo (yellow card) 71' | Stadium: Estadio La Florida; Attendance: 2,700; Referee: Juan Pulido |
