= 2026–27 Primera Federación =

Primera Federación
- Season: 2026–27
- Dates: 28 August 2026 – June 2027
- Top goalscorer: Anai Morales (9 goals)

The 2026–27 Primera Federación season is the sixth for the Primera Federación, the third-highest level in the Spanish football league system. Forty teams will participate, divided into two groups of twenty clubs each based on geographical proximity. In each group, the champions are automatically promoted to Segunda División and the second to fifth placers will play promotion play-offs and the bottom five are relegated to the Segunda Federación.

== Overview before the season ==
A total of 40 teams joined the league, including four relegated from the 2025–26 Segunda División, 26 retained from the 2025–26 Primera Federación, and ten promoted from the 2025–26 Segunda Federación. The groups were defined on 24 June 2026, keeping the same criteria from the last season.

=== Team changes ===
Promoted from 2025–26 Segunda Federación		Relegated from 2025–26 Segunda División	Promoted to 2026–27 Segunda División	Relegated to 2026–27 Segunda Federación		Relegated administratively (Note: Teams which suffered administrative relegation due to financial problems; both teams were already relegated to the fourth division by sporting merit beforehand.)
Águilas; Coria; Deportivo Fabril; Extremadura; Jaén	UD Logroñés; UD Ourense; Rayo Majadahonda; Real Unión; Sant Andreu	Mirandés; Huesca; Cultural Leonesa; Zaragoza	Tenerife; Eldense; Sabadell; Celta Fortuna	Atlético Sanluqueño; Betis Deportivo; Guadalajara; Marbella	Osasuna B Ourense CF; Sevilla Atlético; Talavera de la Reina	Arenteiro; Tarazona

== Group 1 ==
Location of teams in 2026–27 Primera Federación – Group 1

=== Teams and locations ===
Team	Home city	Stadium	Capacity
Arenas	Getxo	Gobela	2,000
Avilés Industrial	Avilés	Román Suárez Puerta	5,400
Barakaldo	Barakaldo	Lasesarre	7,960
Bilbao Athletic	Bilbao	Lezama	3,250
Cacereño	Cáceres	Príncipe Felipe	7,000
Coria	Coria	La Isla	3,000
Cultural Leonesa	León	Estadio Reino de León	13,346
Deportivo Fabril	Abegondo	Cidade Deportiva de Abegondo	1,000
Extremadura	Almendralejo	Francisco de la Hera	11,580
UD Logroñés	Logroño	Las Gaunas	16,000
Lugo	Lugo	Anxo Carro	7,070
Mérida	Mérida	Estadio Romano	14,600
Mirandés	Miranda de Ebro	Estadio Municipal de Anduva	5,759
UD Ourense	Ourense	O Couto	5,659
Ponferradina	Ponferrada	El Toralín	8,400
Pontevedra	Pontevedra	Pasarón	12,000
Racing Ferrol	Ferrol	A Malata	12,043
Real Unión	Irun	Stadium Gal	5,000
Unionistas	Salamanca	Reina Sofía	5,000
Zamora	Zamora	Ruta de la Plata	7,813

=== Personnel and sponsorship ===
Team	Manager	Captain	Kit manufacturer	Shirt main sponsor
Arenas	(Spain) Jon Erice	(Spain) Eneko Zabaleta	Hummel	Grupo Orion
Avilés Industrial	(Spain) Yago Iglesias	(Spain) Natalio	Macron	Avilés
Barakaldo	(Spain) Imanol de la Sota	(Spain) Julen Huidobro	Hummel	SR Financial
Bilbao Athletic	(Spain) Bittor Llopis	(Spain) Iker Monreal	Castore	
Cacereño	(Spain) Julio Cobos	(Spain) Iván Fernández	Hummel	Extremadura
Coria	(Spain) Rai Rosa	(Spain) Sergio Gómez	Macron	Ferretería Cahersa
Cultural Leonesa	(Spain) Fernando Estévez	(Spain) Rodri Suárez	Macron	Aspire Academy
Deportivo Fabril	(Spain) Manuel Pablo	(Spain) Rubén López	Nike	Estrella Galicia
Extremadura	(Spain) David Rocha	(Spain) Imanol Barace	Macron	OJ Maven
UD Logroñés	(Spain) Unai Mendia	(Spain) Miguel Marí	Nike	Natur House
Lugo	(Spain) Borja Fernández	(Spain) Marc Martínez	Puma	Estrella Galicia
Mérida	(Spain) Fran Beltrán	(Spain) Raúl Beneit	Macron	Mérida
Mirandés	(Spain) Aday Benítez	(Spain) Markel Lozano	Adidas	Miranda Empresas
UD Ourense	(Spain) Agustín Ruiz	(Spain) Champi	Nike	BricoCentro Paradelo
Ponferradina	(Tunisia) Mehdi Nafti	(Spain) Borja Valle	Adidas	Tvitec
Pontevedra	(Spain) Rubén Domínguez	(Spain) Álex González	Kappa	Estrella Galicia
Racing Ferrol	(Spain) Javi Vázquez	(Spain) Fabio González	Adidas	Estrella Galicia
Real Unión	(Spain) Ramsés Gil	(Spain) Jon Tena	Macron	Ekipate
Unionistas	(Spain) Javi Medina	(Spain) Ramiro Mayor	Erreà	H&R La Viña
Zamora	(Spain) Óscar Cano	(Spain) Carlos Ramos	Macron	Caja Rural

==== Managerial changes ====
Team	Outgoing manager	Manner of departure	Date of vacancy	Position in the table	Incoming manager	Date of appointment
Lugo	(Spain) Álex Ortiz	End of caretaker spell	28 May 2026	Pre-season	(Spain) Borja Fernández	16 June 2026
Unionistas	(Spain) Mario Simón	End of contract	30 June 2026	Pre-season	(Spain) Javi Medina	9 June 2026
Racing Ferrol	(Spain) Guillermo Fernández Romo	End of contract	30 June 2026	Pre-season	(Spain) Javi Vázquez	2 June 2026
Cultural Leonesa	(Spain) Rubén de la Barrera	End of contract	30 June 2026	Pre-season	(Spain) Jandro Castro	3 June 2026
Bilbao Athletic	(Spain) Jokin Aranbarri	End of contract	30 June 2026	Pre-season	(Spain) Bittor Llopis	24 June 2026
Avilés Industrial	(Spain) Lolo Escobar	End of contract	30 June 2026	Pre-season	(Spain) Yago Iglesias	10 June 2026
UD Ourense	(Spain) Borja Fernández	End of contract	30 June 2026	Pre-season	(Spain) Juan Carballo	13 June 2026
Mirandés	(Spain) Antxon Muneta	Sacked	19 October 2026	11th	(Spain) Aday Benítez	19 October 2026
UD Ourense	(Spain) Juan Carballo	Sacked	26 October 2026	19th	(Spain) Adrián Padrón (caretaker) (Note: Alberto Novoa and Ramón Dacosta were the caretaker managers in a Copa del Rey match against Gimnástica Torrelavega as Padrón was suspended.)	28 October 2026
UD Ourense	(Spain) Adrián Padrón	End of caretaker spell	6 November 2026	20th	(Spain) Agustín Ruiz	6 November 2026
Cultural Leonesa	(Spain) Jandro Castro	Sacked	8 November 2026	14th	(Spain) José Antonio Portillo (caretaker)	8 November 2026
Cultural Leonesa	(Spain) José Antonio Portillo	End of caretaker spell	18 November 2026	15th	(Spain) Fernando Estévez	18 November 2026

=== League table ===
Pos	Team	Pld	W	D	L	GF	GA	GD	Pts	Qualification
1	Lugo	13	10	1	2	22	12	+10	31	Promotion to Segunda División and qualification for the Copa del Rey
2	UD Logroñés	13	8	3	2	26	16	+10	27	Qualification for the promotion play-offs and Copa del Rey
3	Avilés	13	6	3	4	27	18	+9	21	Qualification for the promotion play-offs and Copa del Rey
4	Racing Ferrol	13	6	3	4	13	11	+2	21	Qualification for the promotion play-offs and Copa del Rey
5	Pontevedra	13	6	3	4	16	15	+1	21	Qualification for the promotion play-offs and Copa del Rey
6	Mérida	13	6	2	5	22	16	+6	20	
7	Mirandés	13	6	2	5	16	14	+2	20	
8	Bilbao Athletic	13	5	4	4	18	15	+3	19	
9	Barakaldo	13	4	6	3	13	12	+1	18	
10	Ponferradina	13	4	6	3	10	10	0	18	
11	Cacereño	13	5	3	5	11	12	−1	18	
12	Real Unión	13	4	5	4	21	20	+1	17	
13	Extremadura	13	5	1	7	24	20	+4	16	
14	Cultural Leonesa	13	4	4	5	13	12	+1	16	
15	Coria	13	4	4	5	21	22	−1	16	
16	Zamora	13	3	4	6	13	17	−4	13	Relegation to Segunda Federación
17	Deportivo Fabril	13	3	4	6	17	24	−7	13	Relegation to Segunda Federación
18	Unionistas	13	4	1	8	15	23	−8	13	Relegation to Segunda Federación
19	Arenas	13	3	3	7	13	27	−14	12	Relegation to Segunda Federación
20	UD Ourense	13	2	2	9	7	22	−15	8	Relegation to Segunda Federación

Updated to match(es) played on 22 November 2026. Source: RFEF
Rules for classification: 1) points; 2) head-to-head points; 3) head-to-head goal difference; 4) goal difference; 5) number of goals scored
(Note: Head-to-head record is used only after all the matches between the teams in question have been played).

=== Results ===
Home \ Away	ARE	AVI	BAR	ATH	CAC	COR	CUL	FAB	EXT	LOG	LUG	MER	MIR	OUR	PNF	PNT	RFE	RUN	UNI	ZAM
Arenas	—	1–2		0–3				2–1				0–4		2–0			1–1			1–2
Avilés		—							5–2	1–3	1–2			3–0		0–1			3–1	
Barakaldo	1–1	3–3	—				0–0		1–0				2–0			0–0		2–0	1–0	
Bilbao Athletic		2–1		—	3–1			2–2	1–3								0–0	0–0		
Cacereño	3–0				—		1–0			0–2	0–1		1–0						1–1	1–0
Coria	0–1	1–1	4–1	2–1		—			2–4										4–2	
Cultural Leonesa	4–1					2–2	—					1–0			1–1	1–2				2–0
Deportivo Fabril			2–2		1–1	3–3		—	0–5						2–1		0–1	2–0		
Extremadura							0–1		—							2–3	1–0	2–2	3–0	0–1
UD Logroñés	2–2						1–1	2–1	2–1	—			0–1			1–1				
Lugo						1–0		3–0		3–1	—	2–1	1–3				1–0			
Mérida				2–0	2–0	0–0		1–0		3–5		—	3–4					1–1		
Mirandés				0–1		0–2							—	2–0			2–0		1–0	1–1
UD Ourense			1–0		0–0		1–0			0–3		1–3		—	0–1		2–3			
Ponferradina		0–2	0–0		1–2				2–1		0–0	1–0	1–0		—					
Pontevedra	4–1			1–3	1–0						0–2	1–2		1–0	1–1	—				
Racing Ferrol			1–0							1–2					0–0	2–0	—	3–2	1–0	
Real Unión		0–3				4–1	1–0				4–1		2–2	1–1				—		
Unionistas				2–1			2–0				1–3			3–1				2–4	—	1–0
Zamora		2–2		1–1		2–0		1–3		1–2	1–2				1–1					—

Updated to match(es) played on 22 November 2026. Source:
Legend: Blue = home team win; Yellow = draw; Red = away team win.

=== Top scorers ===
As of 16 Nov 2026

Rank	Player	Club	Goal
1	(Spain) Anai Morales	UD Logroñés	9
2	(Spain) Álvaro Gómez	Unionistas	7
2	(Spain) Álvaro Santamaría	Real Avilés	7
4	(Spain) Aitor Galarza	Real Unión	6
4	(Spain) Iker Unzueta	CD Mirandés	6
4	(Spain) Rodrigo Escudero	CD Extremadura	6

== Group 2 ==
Location of teams in 2026–27 Primera Federación – Group 2
Location of teams in 2026–27 Segunda Federación – Group 5 (Community of Madrid)

=== Teams and locations ===
Team	Home city	Stadium	Capacity
Águilas	Águilas	El Rubial	4,000
Alcorcón	Alcorcón	Santo Domingo	5,100
Algeciras	Algeciras	Nuevo Mirador	7,200
Antequera	Antequera	El Maulí	6,000
Atlético Madrileño	Alcalá de Henares	Centro Deportivo Alcalá de Henares	2,685
Cartagena	Cartagena	Cartagonova	15,105
Europa	Barcelona	Can Dragó	3,000
Gimnàstic	Tarragona	Nou Estadi	14,591
Hércules	Alicante	José Rico Pérez	30,000
Huesca	Huesca	Estadio El Alcoraz	9,100
Ibiza	Ibiza	Can Misses	6,000
Jaén	Jaén	La Victoria	12,569
Juventud Torremolinos	Torremolinos	El Pozuelo	3,000
Murcia	Murcia	Enrique Roca	31,179
Rayo Majadahonda	Majadahonda	Cerro del Espino	3,865
Real Madrid Castilla	Madrid	Alfredo di Stéfano	6,000
Sant Andreu	Barcelona	Narcís Sala	6,653
Teruel	Teruel	Pinilla	4,500
Villarreal B	Villarreal	Estadio de la Cerámica	23,000
Zaragoza	Zaragoza	Ibercaja Stadium	20,000

=== Personnel and sponsorship ===
Team	Manager	Captain	Kit manufacturer	Shirt main sponsor
Águilas	(Spain) Adrián Hernández	(Spain) Mario Abenza	Joma	Urcisol
Alcorcón	(Spain) Fran Justo	(Spain) Esteban Aparicio	Kappa	Griffin Core Solutions
Algeciras	(Spain) Adrián Colunga	(Spain) Iván Turrillo	Capelli Sport	
Antequera	(Spain) Abraham Paz	(Spain) Luismi Gutiérrez	Hummel	Sabor a Málaga
Atlético Madrileño	(Spain) Fernando Torres	(Spain) David Muñoz	Nike	
Cartagena	(Spain) Iñigo Vélez	(Spain) Nacho Martínez	Macron	TeleCartagena
Europa	(Spain) Luis Blanco	(Spain) Àlex Cano	Hummel	ROEH Law & Tax
Gimnàstic	(Spain) Xisco Campos	(Spain) Manel Royo	Adidas	
Hércules	(Spain) Beto Company	(Spain) Carlos Abad	Kappa	Ekokai
Huesca	(Spain) Albert Rudé	(Spain) Óscar Sielva	Soka	Grupo Aramón
Ibiza	(Spain) Raúl Llona	(Spain) Genaro Rodríguez	Puma	Power Electronics
Jaén	(Spain) Manolo Herrero	(Spain) Javi Moyano	Macron	Caja Rural
Juventud Torremolinos	(Sweden) Junes Barny	(Spain) Javi Cuenca	Macron	
Murcia	(Spain) Sergi Guilló	(Spain) Alberto González	Joma	Inversus Group
Rayo Majadahonda	(Spain) Carlos Martínez	(Spain) Dani Ramos	Hummel	Afar 4
Real Madrid Castilla	(Spain) Julián López de Lerma	(Spain) Pol Fortuny	Adidas	Emirates
Sant Andreu	(Spain) Javi Rey	(Spain) Albertito	Munich	XGel
Teruel	(Spain) Dani González	(Spain) Relu	Nike	Fertinagro Biotech
Villarreal B	(Spain) David Albelda	(Spain) Eneko Ortiz	Joma	Pamesa Cerámica
Zaragoza	(Spain) Ibai Gómez	(Spain) Ander Herrera	Adidas	Caravan Fragancias

==== Managerial changes ====
Team	Outgoing manager	Manner of departure	Date of vacancy	Position in the table	Incoming manager	Date of appointment
Zaragoza	(Spain) David Navarro	Back to staff role	1 June 2026	Pre-season	(Spain) Ibai Gómez	4 June 2026
Alcorcón	(Spain) Pablo Álvarez	End of contract	30 June 2026	Pre-season	(Spain) Fran Justo	1 June 2026
Ibiza	(Spain) Miguel Álvarez	End of contract	30 June 2026	Pre-season	(Spain) Raúl Llona	12 June 2026
Murcia	(Spain) Curro Torres	End of contract	30 June 2026	Pre-season	(Spain) Sergi Guilló	25 May 2026
Huesca	(Spain) José Luis Oltra	End of contract	30 June 2026	Pre-season	(Spain) Raúl Jardiel	3 June 2026
Algeciras	(Spain) Javi Vázquez	End of contract	30 June 2026	Pre-season	(Spain) Adrián Colunga	7 June 2026
Gimnàstic	(Spain) Pablo Alfaro	End of contract	30 June 2026	Pre-season	(Spain) Xisco Campos	10 June 2026
Teruel	(Spain) Vicente Parras	End of contract	30 June 2026	Pre-season	(Spain) Kiko Ramírez	6 June 2026
Juventud Torremolinos	(Spain) Carlos Alós	End of contract	30 June 2026	Pre-season	(Spain) Aitor Martínez	22 June 2026
Europa	(Spain) Aday Benítez	Resigned	18 July 2026	Pre-season	(Spain) Josep Maria Gené	18 July 2026
Juventud Torremolinos	(Spain) Aitor Martínez	Sacked	12 August 2026	Pre-season	(Spain) César Arzo	12 August 2026
Europa	(Spain) Josep Maria Gené	Sacked	21 September 2026	19th	(Spain) Luis Blanco	21 September 2026
Juventud Torremolinos	(Spain) César Arzo	Sacked	9 October 2026	20th	(Sweden) Junes Barny (Note: Originally as caretaker manager, appointed on a permanent basis on 19 October 2026.)	9 October 2026
Huesca	(Spain) Raúl Jardiel	Sacked	11 October 2026	9th	(Spain) Albert Rudé	11 October 2026
Teruel	(Spain) Kiko Ramírez	Sacked	28 October 2026	20th	(Spain) Dani González (Note: Originally as caretaker manager, appointed on a permanent basis on 13 November 2026.)	30 October 2026
Sant Andreu	(Spain) Natxo González	Sacked	28 October 2026	15th	(Spain) Javi Rey	28 October 2026
Rayo Majadahonda	(Spain) Guille Fernández	Sacked	15 November 2026	19th	(Spain) Carlos Martínez	15 November 2026

=== League table ===
Pos	Team	Pld	W	D	L	GF	GA	GD	Pts	Qualification
1	Zaragoza	13	9	3	1	27	12	+15	30	Promotion to Segunda División and qualification for the Copa del Rey
2	Villarreal B	13	6	6	1	28	17	+11	24	Qualification for the promotion play-offs
3	Alcorcón	13	6	6	1	25	14	+11	24	Qualification for the promotion play-offs and Copa del Rey
4	Murcia	13	7	2	4	16	11	+5	23	Qualification for the promotion play-offs and Copa del Rey
5	Cartagena	13	6	4	3	21	15	+6	22	Qualification for the promotion play-offs and Copa del Rey
6	Ibiza	13	6	3	4	22	15	+7	21	Qualification for the Copa del Rey
7	Hércules	13	6	3	4	15	15	0	21	
8	Real Madrid Castilla	13	5	4	4	16	15	+1	19	
9	Jaén	13	5	4	4	21	23	−2	19	
10	Atlético Madrileño	13	4	5	4	23	20	+3	17	
11	Antequera	13	4	5	4	20	18	+2	17	
12	Algeciras	13	5	2	6	18	19	−1	17	
13	Sant Andreu	13	4	4	5	17	16	+1	16	
14	Gimnàstic	13	4	4	5	18	20	−2	16	
15	Huesca	13	3	6	4	13	18	−5	15	
16	Europa	13	4	1	8	11	22	−11	13	Relegation to Segunda Federación
17	Águilas	13	2	6	5	11	18	−7	12	Relegation to Segunda Federación
18	Juventud Torremolinos	13	2	5	6	14	23	−9	11	Relegation to Segunda Federación
19	Rayo Majadahonda	13	2	1	10	8	18	−10	7	Relegation to Segunda Federación
20	Teruel	13	1	4	8	5	20	−15	7	Relegation to Segunda Federación

Updated to match(es) played on 22 November 2026. Source: RFEF
Rules for classification: 1) points; 2) head-to-head points; 3) head-to-head goal difference; 4) goal difference; 5) number of goals scored
(Note: Head-to-head record is used only after all the matches between the teams in question have been played)

=== Results ===
Home \ Away	AGU	ALC	ALG	ANT	ATM	CAR	EUR	GIM	HER	HUE	IBI	JAE	JUV	MUR	RMJ	RMC	SAN	TER	VIL	ZAR
Águilas	—	2–2					0–2	1–1	0–1	2–2	1–2					1–0				
Alcorcón		—	1–0				0–0	3–0		1–1	3–3	4–3	5–0							
Algeciras	1–1		—	2–1		1–3			2–0						1–0	2–0				
Antequera		1–1		—		1–1					3–2	2–0	2–1	0–1	3–1					
Atlético Madrileño		1–1			—							1–1	2–2	4–0				1–0	1–3	4–4
Cartagena	4–1					—	3–0	0–0				4–2		1–0			2–2			
Europa			2–1		3–2		—		1–2			0–3			1–0		0–2			0–1
Gimnàstic			4–2		2–1			—	4–2							0–1	1–2			2–0
Hércules					0–2				—			0–0	1–0	1–2	2–0		1–0		2–2	
Huesca				1–1	0–0		3–1	2–0		—	0–4						1–0		0–3	a
Ibiza						0–1	3–0				—				2–1	1–1	2–0			0–2
Jaén			3–2							2–2	2–1	—			1–0				3–3	0–4
Juventud Torremolinos	0–0		1–2					2–2		1–0			—	1–0						3–4
Murcia		1–2	1–1				2–1	2–0						—				4–0		0–0
Rayo Majadahonda	0–1					1–1								0–1	—		2–1	2–0	1–2	
Real Madrid Castilla		1–2		3–2	3–2	2–0			2–2				2–0	0–2		—				
Sant Andreu	2–0			2–2	1–2		a						2–2			1–1	—	2–0		
Teruel	1–1	1–0							0–1	1–1	1–1	0–1				0–0		—		
Villarreal B			2–1	2–2		4–1		2–2			0–1		1–1					2–0	—	
Zaragoza				1–0		1–0				2–0					2–0			4–1	2–2	—

Updated to match(es) played on 22 November 2026. Source:
Legend: Blue = home team win; Yellow = draw; Red = away team win.

=== Top scorers ===
As of 16 Nov 2026

Rank	Player	Club	Goal
1	(Spain) Albert García	Villarreal B	8
2	(Nigeria) Destiny Ilahude	Antequera	7
3	(Spain) Marc Domènech	Atlético Madrileño	6
3	(Spain) Marco Siverio	Real Jaén	6
3	(Spain) Esteban Aparicio	Alcorcón	6
3	(Spain) Jaume Jardí	Real Zaragoza	6

== See also ==
- 2026–27 La Liga
- 2026–27 Segunda División
- 2026–27 Segunda Federación
- 2026–27 Tercera Federación
