= Manuel Mosquera =

Manuel Mosquera may refer to:

- Manuel Mosquera (footballer, born 1968), Spanish football manager and former forward
- Manuel Mosquera (footballer, born 1984), Panamanian football striker
- Manu Mosquera (born 1999), Spanish football forward
