= 2001–02 Racing de Santander season =

Racing de Santander
2001–02 season
- Head coach: Gustavo Benítez (until 3 October); Quique Setién (from 7 October)
- Stadium: Campos de Sport de El Sardinero
- Segunda División: 2nd (promoted)
- Copa del Rey: Round of 64
- Top goalscorer: League: Rodolfo Bodipo (11); All: Rodolfo Bodipo (11)
- Average home league attendance: 10,610
- Biggest win: 4–0 against Numancia; 0–4 against Córdoba
- Biggest defeat: 1–5 against Recreativo

The 2001–02 season was the 89th season in the history of Racing de Santander and the club's first season back in the second division of Spanish football since 1993. In addition to the domestic league, Racing Santander participated in this season's edition of the Copa del Rey.

== Competitions ==
=== Overall record ===
Competition	First match	Last match	Starting round	Final position	Record							
Competition	First match	Last match	Starting round	Final position	Pld	W	D	L	GF	GA	GD	Win %
Segunda División	25 August 2001	25 May 2002	Matchday 1	2nd	42	19	14	9	58	37	+21	45.24
Copa del Rey	10 October 2001		First round	Round of 64	1	0	0	1	0	1	−1	0.00
Total					43	19	14	10	58	38	+20	44.19

Source: Competitions

=== Segunda División ===
==== League table ====
Pos	Team	Pld	W	D	L	GF	GA	GD	Pts	Promotion or relegation
1	Atlético Madrid (C, P)	42	23	10	9	68	44	+24	79	Promotion to La Liga
2	Racing Santander (P)	42	19	14	9	58	37	+21	71	Promotion to La Liga
3	Recreativo (P)	42	18	15	9	47	35	+12	69	Promotion to La Liga
4	Xerez	42	19	9	14	43	42	+1	66	
5	Elche	42	17	14	11	52	39	+13	65	

Source: LFP - Liga Adelante
Rules for classification: 1st points; 2nd head-to-head points; 3rd head-to-head goal difference; 4th head-to-head goals scored; 5th goal difference; 6th number of goals scored; 7th Fair-play points
(C) Champions; (P) Promoted

==== Results summary ====
Overall								Home						Away					
Pld	W	D	L	GF	GA	GD	Pts	W	D	L	GF	GA	GD	W	D	L	GF	GA	GD
42	19	14	9	58	37	+21	71	14	4	3	37	17	+20	5	10	6	21	20	+1

Source: Segunda División

==== Results by round ====
Round	1	2	3	4	5	6	7	8	9	10	11	12	13	14	15	16	17	18	19	20	21	22	23	24	25	26	27	28	29	30	31	32	33	34	35	36	37	38	39	40	41	42
Ground	A	H	A	H	H	A	H	A	H	A	H	A	H	A	H	A	H	A	H	A	H	H	A	H	A	A	H	A	H	A	H	A	H	A	H	A	H	A	H	A	H	A
Result	D	D	L	W	L	D	D	L	W	D	W	D	W	L	W	W	W	D	W	L	W	W	D	D	L	D	W	D	L	W	W	W	L	D	W	W	W	W	D	D	W	L
Position	15	14	18	13	15	19	19	20	17	18	15	14	10	13	10	6	4	4	3	5	3	3	3	4	4	4	4	4	5	4	3	3	4	4	3	3	2	2	2	2	2	2

Source: Segunda División
A = Away; H = Home; W = Win; D = Draw; L = Loss

==== Matches ====
25 August 2001 1	Gimnàstic de Tarragona	0–0	Racing Santander	Tarragona
CEST (UTC+2)				Stadium: Nou Estadi de Tarragona; Referee: Manuel Ángel Pérez Lima

2 September 2001 2	Racing Santander	1–1	Oviedo	Santander
CEST (UTC+2)				Stadium: Campos de Sport de El Sardinero; Referee: Miguel García Delgado

9 September 2001 3	Extremadura	2–0	Racing Santander	Almendralejo
CEST (UTC+2)	Mosquera 28', 89'			Stadium: Estadio Francisco de la Hera; Referee: Miguel Carlos Román González

16 September 2001 4	Racing Santander	1–0	Xerez	Santander
CEST (UTC+2)	Morán 13'			Stadium: Campos de Sport de El Sardinero; Referee: Ángel Rodado Rodríguez

23 September 2001 5	Racing Santander	0–2	Burgos	Santander
CEST (UTC+2)			Isailović 53'; Merino 78'	Stadium: Campos de Sport de El Sardinero; Referee: José Luis Rebollo Soto

29 September 2001 6	Jaén	0–0	Racing Santander	Jaén
CEST (UTC+2)				Stadium: Nuevo Estadio de La Victoria

3 October 2001 7	Racing Santander	1–1	Eibar	Santander
CEST (UTC+2)				Stadium: Campos de Sport de El Sardinero

7 October 2001 8	Racing Ferrol	2–0	Racing Santander	Ferrol
CEST (UTC+2)				Stadium: Estadio Municipal da Malata

13 October 2001 9	Racing Santander	3–1	Leganés	Santander
CEST (UTC+2)				Stadium: Campos de Sport de El Sardinero

21 October 2001 10	Levante	1–1	Racing Santander	Valencia
CEST (UTC+2)				Stadium: Estadi Ciutat de València

28 October 2001 11	Racing Santander	2–0	Salamanca	Santander
CEST (UTC+2)				Stadium: Campos de Sport de El Sardinero

3 November 2001 12	Recreativo	1–1	Racing Santander	Huelva
CET (UTC+1)

7 November 2001 13	Racing Santander	2–1	Sporting Gijón	Santander
CET (UTC+1)				Stadium: Campos de Sport de El Sardinero

11 November 2001 14	Badajoz	3–2	Racing Santander	Badajoz
CET (UTC+1)

17 November 2001 15	Racing Santander	4–0	Numancia	Santander
CET (UTC+1)				Stadium: Campos de Sport de El Sardinero

25 November 2001 16	Albacete	0–1	Racing Santander	Albacete
CET (UTC+1)

2 December 2001 17	Racing Santander	2–0	Córdoba	Santander
CET (UTC+1)				Stadium: Campos de Sport de El Sardinero

8 December 2001 18	Elche	1–1	Racing Santander	Elche
CET (UTC+1)

16 December 2001 19	Racing Santander	1–0	Murcia	Santander
CET (UTC+1)				Stadium: Campos de Sport de El Sardinero

22 December 2001 20	Atlético Madrid	2–0	Racing Santander	Madrid
CET (UTC+1)				Stadium: Vicente Calderón

5 January 2002 21	Racing Santander	2–1	Poli Ejido	Santander
CET (UTC+1)				Stadium: Campos de Sport de El Sardinero

13 January 2002 22	Racing Santander	3–0	Gimnàstic de Tarragona	Santander
CET (UTC+1)				Stadium: Campos de Sport de El Sardinero

20 January 2002 23	Oviedo	0–0	Racing Santander	Oviedo
CET (UTC+1)				Stadium: Estadio Carlos Tartiere

27 January 2002 24	Racing Santander	1–1	Extremadura	Santander
CET (UTC+1)				Stadium: Campos de Sport de El Sardinero

3 February 2002 25	Xerez	2–1	Racing Santander	Jerez de la Frontera
CET (UTC+1)				Stadium: Estadio Municipal de Chapín

6 February 2002 26	Burgos	0–0	Racing Santander	Burgos
CET (UTC+1)				Stadium: Estadio El Plantío

9 February 2002 27	Racing Santander	2–0	Jaén	Santander
CET (UTC+1)				Stadium: Campos de Sport de El Sardinero

16 February 2002 28	Eibar	2–2	Racing Santander	Eibar
CET (UTC+1)				Stadium: Ipurua Municipal Stadium

24 February 2002 29	Racing Santander	0–1	Racing Ferrol	Santander
CET (UTC+1)				Stadium: Campos de Sport de El Sardinero

2 March 2002 30	Leganés	1–4	Racing Santander	Leganés
CET (UTC+1)				Stadium: Estadio Municipal de Butarque

10 March 2002 31	Racing Santander	4–2	Levante	Santander
CET (UTC+1)				Stadium: Campos de Sport de El Sardinero

17 March 2002 32	Salamanca	1–2	Racing Santander	Villares de la Reina
CET (UTC+1)				Stadium: Helmántico Stadium

24 March 2002 33	Racing Santander	1–5	Recreativo	Santander
CET (UTC+1)				Stadium: Campos de Sport de El Sardinero

31 March 2002 34	Sporting Gijón	1–1	Racing Santander	Gijón
CEST (UTC+2)				Stadium: El Molinón

7 April 2002 35	Racing Santander	3–0	Badajoz	Santander
CEST (UTC+2)				Stadium: Campos de Sport de El Sardinero

14 April 2002 36	Numancia	0–1	Racing Santander	Soria
CEST (UTC+2)				Stadium: Nuevo Estadio Los Pajaritos

21 April 2002 37	Racing Santander	3–1	Albacete	Santander
CEST (UTC+2)				Stadium: Campos de Sport de El Sardinero

28 April 2002 38	Córdoba	0–4	Racing Santander	Córdoba
CEST (UTC+2)				Stadium: Estadio Nuevo Arcángel

4 May 2002 39	Racing Santander	0–0	Elche	Santander
CEST (UTC+2)				Stadium: Campos de Sport de El Sardinero

12 May 2002 40	Murcia	0–0	Racing Santander	Murcia
CEST (UTC+2)				Stadium: Estadio de La Condomina

19 May 2002 41	Racing Santander	1–0	Atlético Madrid	Santander
CEST (UTC+2)				Stadium: Campos de Sport de El Sardinero

25 May 2002 42	Poli Ejido	1–0	Racing Santander	El Ejido
CEST (UTC+2)				Stadium: Estadio Municipal Santo Domingo

=== Copa del Rey ===
10 October 2001 Round of 64	Cultural Leonesa	1–0	Racing Santander	León
CEST (UTC+2)				Stadium: Estadio Reino de León
