= Belevonis =

Belevonis (Greek: Μπελεβώνης) is a Greek surname that may refer to the following notable people:

- Christos Belevonis (born 2002), Greek football forward
- Makis Belevonis (born 1975), Greek football right back
- Stathis Belevonis (born 1998), Greek football defender
