= Juan Carballo =

Spanish football manager

Personal information
- Full name: Juan Carballo Suárez
- Date of birth: 2 March 1996 (age 30)
- Place of birth: O Carballiño, Spain
- Position: Midfielder

Youth career
- EMF Arenteiro
- 2012–2015: Pabellón Ourense

Senior career*
Years	Team	Apps	(Gls)
2015–2018	Maside		

Managerial career
- 2014–2015: Arrabaldo (youth)
- 2015–2021: Pabellón Ourense (youth)
- 2021–2022: Celta (youth)
- 2022–2024: Ourense (youth)
- 2024–2026: Ourense (assistant)
- 2026: Ourense
- * Club domestic league appearances and goals

Juan Carballo Suárez (born 2 March 1996) is a Spanish former footballer who played as a midfielder, and the manager of UD Ourense.

== Career ==
Born in O Carballiño, Ourense, Galicia, Carballo impressed with EMF Arenteiro and Pabellón Ourense CF as a youth, but suffered a knee injury which curtailed his career. He only played as a senior for Maside FC in the regional leagues, retiring in 2018 at the age of 22.

Shortly after his serious injury, Carballo took up coaching at SD Arrabaldo, before managing several categories at Pabellón. In August 2021, he joined the structure of RC Celta de Vigo, being the manager of their Infantil B squad.

In 2022, Carballo left Celta and moved to UD Ourense as their Juvenil A manager. He became the assistant of Borja Fernández in the first team in Tercera Federación in 2024, being also in charge of the club in six matches of the 2024–25 season was suspended; he remained unbeaten in all matches, achieving five wins and one draw.

On 11 June 2026, after two consecutive promotions as an assistant of Fernández, Carballo was appointed manager of Ourense in their first-ever Primera Federación campaign. On 26 October, after just one win in eight matches, he was sacked.
