= Bittor Llopis =

Spanish football manager

Personal information
- Full name: Bittor Llopis Fernández
- Date of birth: 7 February 1988 (age 38)
- Place of birth: Barakaldo, Spain
- Height: 1.91 m (6 ft 3 in)
- Position: Midfielder

Team information
- Current team: Bilbao Athletic (manager)

Youth career
- 1998–2006: Leioa

Senior career*
Years	Team	Apps	(Gls)
2006–2007	Deusto		
2007–2008	Urduliz		
2008–2009	Larramendi		
2009–2012	Erandio		
2012–2013	Moraza		
2013–2015	Santurtzi		
2015–2016	Oin-Baloia		

Managerial career
- 2005–2017: Leioa (youth)
- 2017–2021: Alavés (youth)
- 2021–2022: San Ignacio
- 2022–2023: Athletic Bilbao (youth)
- 2023–2026: Basconia
- 2026–: Bilbao Athletic
- * Club domestic league appearances and goals

Bittor Llopis Fernández (born 7 February 1988) is a Spanish former footballer who played as a midfielder, and the manager of Bilbao Athletic.

== Career ==
Born in Barakaldo, Biscay, Basque Country, Llopis played for SD Leioa as a youth, and spent the most of his career playing for teams in his native region in Tercera División and the regional leagues: SD Deusto, Urduliz FT, CD Larramendi, SD Erandio Club, SD Moraza, CD Santurtzi and Oin-Baloia de Bilbao FT. He retired with the latter in 2016, aged 28.

Llopis began his coaching career at the age of 17, at Leioa. On 15 June 2016, he joined Deportivo Alavés to become their Juvenil B manager.

Llopis was named manager of the Juvenil A squad of the Babazorros in August 2018, before replacing Raúl Llona as manager of Club San Ignacio in February 2021. In July, he joined the structure of Athletic Bilbao, becoming their Juvenil A manager.

On 1 June 2023, Llopis was announced as CD Basconia manager in Tercera Federación. He helped the side to achieve a promotion to Segunda Federación in 2025, and took over the reserves in Primera Federación on 24 June 2026.

== Managerial statistics ==
As of 26 September 2026

Managerial record by team and tenure
Team	Nat	From	To	Record								Ref
Team	Nat	From	To	G	W	D	L	GF	GA	GD	Win %	Ref
San Ignacio	(Spain)	9 February 2021	25 July 2022	50	21	10	19	64	56	+8	42.00	
Basconia	(Spain)	1 June 2023	24 June 2026	104	52	31	21	199	112	+87	50.00	
Bilbao Athletic	(Spain)	24 June 2026	Present	5	3	2	0	11	5	+6	60.00	
Total				159	76	43	40	274	173	+101	47.80	—
