= Braulio Vázquez =

Spanish footballer and manager

Braulio
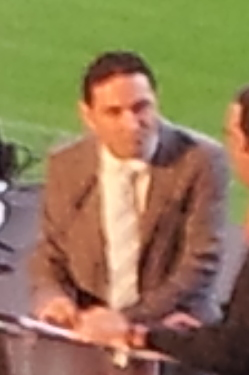
- Braulio in 2013

Personal information
- Full name: Braulio Jesús Vázquez Benítez
- Date of birth: 14 March 1972 (age 54)
- Place of birth: Pontevedra, Spain
- Height: 1.79 m (5 ft 10 in)
- Position: Forward

Team information
- Current team: Valencia CF (sporting director)

Youth career
- Deportivo La Coruña

Senior career*
Years	Team	Apps	(Gls)
1991–1996	Deportivo B		
1995–1996	Deportivo La Coruña	2	(0)
1996–1998	Farense	58	(9)
1998–1999	CP Mérida	38	(6)
1999–2001	Castellón	48	(10)
2001	Zamora	13	(3)
2001–2002	Novelda	7	(0)
2002–2003	Mérida UD	44	(1)
2003–2006	Lugo	90	(26)
2006–2007	Bergantiños	28	(6)
Total		361	(71)

Managerial career
- 2007–2008: Soneira
- 2008: Laracha
- * Club domestic league appearances and goals

Braulio Jesús Vázquez Benítez (born 14 March 1972), simply known as Braulio, is a Spanish football manager and former player who played as a forward. He is the current sporting director of Valencia CF.

== Career ==
As a player, Braulio's career consisted mostly of Segunda División B appearances. His professional inputs included two La Liga matches for Deportivo de La Coruña, aside from a two-season spell with Portuguese Primeira Liga side S.C. Farense and one year with CP Mérida in Segunda División.

After retiring, Braulio worked as a manager for Soneira SD and Laracha CF before joining Valencia CF as a technical secretary. He subsequently moved to the sporting director position at the latter club in 2010, later working under the same role at Real Valladolid and CA Osasuna.

== Personal life ==
Braulio's son Jesús is also a footballer. A left back, he was a Valencia youth graduate.
