= Romualdas Jansonas =

Lithuanian footballer (born 2005)

Personal information
- Date of birth: 23 June 2005 (age 21)
- Place of birth: Vilnius, Lithuania
- Height: 1.87 m (6 ft 2 in)
- Position: Forward

Team information
- Current team: UD Ourense (on loan from Arouca)
- Number: 24

Youth career
- 2017–2024: Žalgiris

Senior career*
Years	Team	Apps	(Gls)
2023–2025	Žalgiris	53	(4)
2025	Kauno Žalgiris	31	(7)
2025–	Arouca	3	(0)
2026	→ Os Belenenses (loan)	3	(0)
2026–	→ UD Ourense (loan)	1	(0)

International career^{‡}
2021	Lithuania U17	5	(1)
2023–2024	Lithuania U19	14	(7)
2023–2024	Lithuania U19	14	(7)
2024–	Lithuania U21	11	(2)
2024–	Lithuania	5	(0)
- * Club domestic league appearances and goals as of 7 May 2026 ‡ National team caps and goals as of 9 June 2026

Romualdas Jansonas (born 23 June 2005) is a Lithuanian professional footballer who plays as a forward for Primera Federación club UD Ourense in Spain on loan from Portuguese club Arouca.

== Early life ==
Jansonas was born on 23 June 2005. Born in Vilnius, Lithuania, he is a native of the city.

== Club career ==
As a youth player, Jansonas joined the youth academy of Lithuanian side Žalgiris, where he played in the UEFA Youth League and was promoted to the club's senior team ahead of the 2023 season, where he made forty-seven league appearances and scored two goals and helped them win the league title.

Following his stint there, he signed for Lithuanian side Kauno Žalgiris in 2025, where he made twenty-three league appearances and scored six goals. Subsequently, he signed for Portuguese side Arouca the same year.

== International career ==
Jansonas is a Lithuania international. During the autumn of 2025, he played for the Lithuania national football team for 2026 FIFA World Cup qualification.
