= Borikó =

Borikó is a Spanish surname. Notable people with the surname include:

- Emiliano Buale Borikó (1954–2014), Equatorial Guinean intellectual, politician, and writer
- James Davis Borikó (born 1995), Spanish professional footballer
- Santi Borikó (born 2003), Spanish footballer
