= Daniel González =

Daniel González may refer to:

== Sportspeople ==
- Daniel González (Uruguayan footballer) (1953–1985), Uruguayan football defender
- Dan Gonzalez (born 1974), American gridiron football player
- Dani González (football manager), Spanish football manager
- Dani González (footballer) (born 2002), Spanish football forward
- Daniel Gonzalez (goalkeeper) (fl. 1975–present), Argentine football coach and former goalkeeper
- Daniel González (footballer, born 1984), Chilean football midfielder
- Daniel González Benítez (born 1987), Spanish football midfielder
- Daniel González (footballer, born 1991), Argentine football midfielder
- Daniel González (footballer, born 1992), Mexican football striker
- Daniel Gonzalez (soccer, born 1992), American soccer midfielder
- Daniel González (footballer, born 2002), Chilean football defender
- Daniel González (footballer, born 2004), Mexican football forward

== Other people ==
- Daniel Gonzalez (spree killer) (1980–2007), British spree killer
- Danny Gonzalez (born 1990), American boxer
- Danny Gonzalez (born 1994), American YouTuber
