= Aitor Martínez =

Aitor Martínez may refer to:

- Aitor Martínez (footballer) (born 1985), Spanish football manager and former midfielder
- Aitor Martínez (swimmer) (born 1993), Spanish swimmer
