= Álex Díez =

Spanish footballer

Personal information
- Full name: Alejandro Díez Salomón
- Date of birth: 17 February 1996 (age 30)
- Place of birth: Cáceres, Spain
- Height: 1.73 m (5 ft 8 in)
- Position: Right back

Team information
- Current team: Rayo Majadahonda

Youth career
- –2014: Atlético Madrid
- 2014–2015: Leganés

Senior career*
Years	Team	Apps	(Gls)
2015–2016	Cacereño	23	(0)
2016–2017	Mérida	18	(1)
2017–2020	Extremadura	99	(2)
2020–2022	Las Palmas	29	(0)
2022–2024	Ponferradina	39	(2)
2024–2025	Botoșani	14	(1)
2025–2026	Stal Mielec	26	(1)
2026–	Rayo Majadahonda	0	(0)

International career
2012	Spain U16	1	(0)
- * Club domestic league appearances and goals as of 20:49, 26 May 2026 (UTC)

Alejandro "Álex" Díez Salomón (born 17 February 1996) is a Spanish professional footballer who plays as a right back for Primera Federación club Rayo Majadahonda.

== Club career ==
Díez was born in Cáceres, Extremadura, and represented Atlético Madrid and CD Leganés as a youth. In June 2015 he joined hometown club CP Cacereño, and made his senior debut on 30 August by playing eight minutes in a 1–0 Segunda División B home win against Pontevedra CF.

On 21 June 2016, after suffering relegation, Díez joined fellow third division side Mérida AD. The following 21 May, after featuring sparingly, he signed for Extremadura UD in the same category, achieving promotion to Segunda División at the end of the campaign.

Díez made his professional debut on 19 August 2018, starting in a 1–1 away draw against Real Oviedo. He scored his first professional goal on 16 November of the following year, netting the opener in a 2–0 home win against Deportivo de La Coruña, and was an ever-present figure during the season as his side suffered relegation.

On 10 August 2020, free agent Díez agreed to a three-year contract with UD Las Palmas still in the second division. He terminated his link with the club on 18 August 2022, and moved to fellow league team SD Ponferradina on 14 November.

In August 2024, Díez joined Romanian Liga I club Botoșani on a one-year deal.

On 12 July 2025, Díez signed a one-year contract with Polish second tier club Stal Mielec, with a one-year extension option.

On 1 September 2026, Díez returned to Spain to sign with Rayo Majadahonda, in the third tier.
