= Josep Maria Gené =

Spanish football manager

Personal information
- Full name: Josep Maria Gené Camps
- Date of birth: 13 October 1957 (age 69)
- Place of birth: El Poal, Spain

Youth career
- Poal
- La Salle Tarragona
- Barcelona
- Espanyol
- Europa

Senior career*
Years	Team	Apps	(Gls)
1976–1977	Europa Amateur		
- Atlètic Castellserà
- Juneda

Managerial career
- 1981–1982: Atlètic Castellserà (youth)
- Montañesa (youth)
- Damm (youth)
- 1993–1994: Mollerussa
- 1999–2022: Josep Maria Gené (youth)
- 2018: Olímpic Can Fatjó
- 2020–2022: Europa B
- 2022–2026: Europa B (assistant)
- 2026: Europa B
- 2026: Europa
- * Club domestic league appearances and goals

Josep Maria Gené Camps (born 13 October 1957) is a Spanish former footballer and manager.

== Career ==
Born in El Poal, Lleida, Catalonia, Gené began his career with hometown side CF Poal, and joined FC Barcelona's youth sides at the age of 13 after representing La Salle Tarragona AF. After representing RCD Espanyol and CE Europa as a youth, he played for the latter's amateur side in the 1976–77 season before resuming his career with amateur sides Club Atlètic Castellserà (where he also began his coaching career) and Juneda CF.

Gené subsequently coached the youth sides of CF Montañesa and CF Damm, aside from working in the Catalan Football Federation in the 1980s and 1990s. In 1993, he was in charge of Primera Catalana side CFJ Mollerussa, after the club reached a partnership with UE Lleida.

In 1999, Gené founded a club to help in the development of young footballers; the club was named AE Josep Maria Gené. In the following 23 years, he acted as president, sporting director and one of the managers of that club, and also was one of the founders of Talent Futbol, a representation agency.

On 4 June 2018, Gené was appointed manager of Segona Catalana side CE Olímpic Can Fatjó, after the club reached an agreement with his own club. He left on 26 November, after the agreement ended.

On 3 June 2020, Gené returned to Europa, being named manager of the reserves also in Segona Catalana. He renewed his contract with the club on 6 July of the following year, and led the club to a promotion to Primera Catalana at the end of the season before becoming a sporting director.

Gené was later an assistant of Jonathan Ruiz and Joan Piñol in the B-side before taking over the team on 21 January 2026, after Piñol left. On 18 July, he was named at the helm of the first team, after Aday Benítez's departure, but was sacked on 21 September, following a poor start to the season.
