= Rufo Sánchez =

Spanish footballer (born 1986)

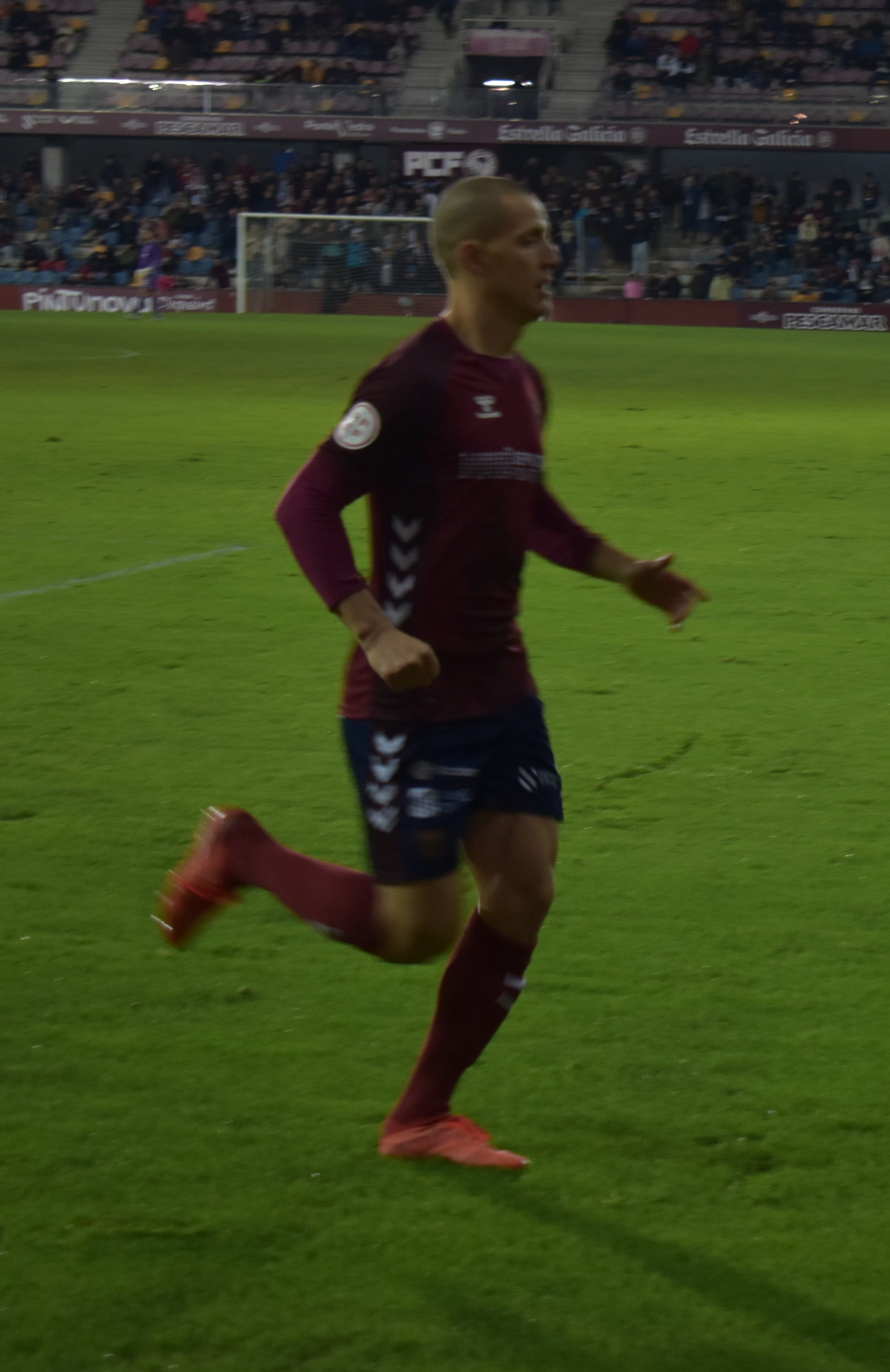
- Rufo with Pontevedra in 2022

Personal information
- Full name: Rufino Familiar Sánchez
- Date of birth: 27 December 1986 (age 39)
- Place of birth: Madrid, Spain
- Height: 1.81 m (5 ft 11 1/2 in)
- Position: Forward

Team information
- Current team: UD Ourense
- Number: 9

Youth career
- Coslada
- Rayo Majadahonda

Senior career*
Years	Team	Apps	(Gls)
2005–2006	Rayo Majadahonda B		
2006–2007	San Fernando Henares		
2007–2008	Torrejón	15	(0)
2008	Internacional Madrid		
2008–2009	Atlético Pinto	29	(3)
2009–2012	Internacional Madrid	?	(46)
2012–2013	Stallion	14	(18)
2013	Global	0	(0)
2013	Internacional Madrid	2	(0)
2014	PTT Rayong	26	(7)
2015–2016	Songkhla United	22	(10)
2017	Sanluqueño	14	(1)
2017–2018	Global Cebu	?	(7)
2018–2020	Internacional Madrid	50	(16)
2020–2025	Pontevedra	148	(53)
2025–	UD Ourense	28	(7)
- * Club domestic league appearances and goals as of 1 May 2026

Rufino "Rufo" Familiar Sánchez (born 27 December 1986) is a Spanish professional footballer who plays for Segunda Federación club UD Ourense as a forward.

== Club career ==
Born in Madrid, Rufo represented CD Coslada and CF Rayo Majadahonda as a youth, and made his senior debut with the latter's reserves during the 2005–06 season, in the regional leagues. He subsequently represented, all in his native region, CD San Fernando de Henares, AD Torrejón CF, Internacional de Madrid (two stints) and CA Pinto, all in Tercera División; his best input in the country consisted of 30 goals during the 2009–10 campaign, while in representation of the second latter club.

In 2012, after impressing in a friendly match, Rufo joined Stallion FC of Philippines' United Football League. He moved to fellow league team Global FC in July 2013, but his transfer was blocked by Stallion after his contract was disputed by his previous club. He moved back to Internacional in November 2013,

On 14 January 2014, Rufo switched teams and countries again after agreeing to a contract with Thai Premier League club PTT Rayong FC. He made his debut for the club on 23 February, netting the opener in a 1–1 away draw against Singhtarua FC.

Ahead of the 2015 season, Rufo moved to Songkhla United FC. On 18 January 2017, he returned to Spain and signed for Atlético Sanluqueño CF in Segunda División B.

Rufo returned to Global Cebu on 1 August 2017, but left the Philippines Football League club in May 2018. In August, he returned to Internacional, with the club now in the third division.

In January 2020, Rufo moved to Pontevedra CF.

== Honours ==
=== Club ===
Stallion

- United Football League: 2013
- UFL Cup: 2012

=== Individual ===
- United Football League Golden Boot: 2013 (18 goals)
- United Football League Golden Ball: 2013
