= Agustín Ruiz =

Spanish footballer (born 1987)

Personal information
- Full name: Pedro Agustín Ruiz Galnares
- Date of birth: 3 December 1973 (age 52)
- Place of birth: Barakaldo, Spain
- Height: 1.80 m (5 ft 11 in)
- Position: Defender

Team information
- Current team: UD Ourense (manager)

Youth career
- Athletic Bilbao

Senior career*
Years	Team	Apps	(Gls)
1993–1994	Basconia	30	(0)
1994–1996	Bilbao Athletic	50	(1)
1996–2004	CD Ourense	166	(4)
2004–2005	Verín	28	(4)
2005–2006	Lemos	20	(0)
2006–2008	Arenteiro		

Managerial career
- 2014–2016: Barbadás (assistant)
- 2016–2019: UD Ourense (youth)
- 2019–2024: Barbadás
- 2025: Pabellón Ourense (youth)
- 2025: Arenteiro (youth)
- 2025–2026: Barco
- 2026–: UD Ourense
- * Club domestic league appearances and goals

Pedro Agustín Ruiz Galnares (born 6 December 1973) is a Spanish former professional footballer who played as a defender, and the current manager of UD Ourense.

== Playing career ==
Born in Barakaldo, Biscay, Basque Country, Ruiz finished his formation with Athletic Bilbao. He played for farm team CD Basconia before making his professional debut with the reserves on 1 October 1994, in a 0–0 Segunda División away draw against SD Eibar.

In 1996, after Bilbao Athletic's relegation, Ruiz moved to fellow second division side CD Ourense. He left the side in 2004 after mainly playing in Segunda División B, and joined Tercera División side Verín CF shortly after.

On 25 August 2005, Ruiz was announced at Club Lemos also in the fourth tier. He agreed to a deal with CD Arenteiro in the regional leagues in the following year, and retired in 2008 at the age of 34.

== Coaching career ==
After retiring, Ruiz worked as an assistant of Peluso at UD Barbadás before joining UD Ourense as manager of their Cadete team in 2016.

In June 2019, after two seasons in charge of Ourense's Juvenil squad, Ruiz returned to Barbadás after being named manager of the first team. He led the club to a promotion to Tercera Federación after five years away from a national division in 2023, but left on 22 May 2024, as his contract would not be renewed.

In January 2025, Ruiz joined the structure of Pabellón Ourense CF as the manager of their Infantil team. He later worked at Arenteiro's Cadete squad, and returned to senior football on 15 December 2025, after taking over CD Barco in the fifth division.

On 6 November 2026, Ruiz returned to Ourense after being presented as their manager in Primera Federación.

== Managerial statistics ==
As of 7 November 2026

Managerial record by team and tenure
Team	Nat	From	To	Record								Ref
Team	Nat	From	To	G	W	D	L	GF	GA	GD	Win %	Ref
Barbadás	(Spain)	27 June 2019	21 May 2024	148	70	40	38	215	152	+63	47.30	
Barco	(Spain)	15 December 2025	5 November 2026	29	14	6	9	39	32	+7	48.28	
UD Ourense	(Spain)	5 November 2026	Present	1	0	0	1	0	1	−1	0.00	
Total				178	84	46	48	254	185	+69	47.19	—
