= Kike Márquez =

Spanish footballer (born 1989)

Personal information
- Full name: Enrique Márquez Climent
- Date of birth: 23 July 1989 (age 37)
- Place of birth: Sanlúcar de Barrameda, Spain
- Height: 1.75 m (5 ft 9 in)
- Position: Winger

Team information
- Current team: CD Extremadura

Youth career
- Sanluqueño
- 2007–2008: Villarreal

Senior career*
Years	Team	Apps	(Gls)
2007	Sanluqueño	2	(0)
2008–2010	Almería B	69	(12)
2010–2011	Recreativo B	32	(12)
2010	Recreativo	1	(0)
2011–2012	Betis B	32	(6)
2012–2013	Sanluqueño	35	(10)
2013–2016	Cádiz	78	(12)
2016	→ Racing Ferrol (loan)	15	(0)
2016–2017	Marbella	35	(14)
2017–2021	Extremadura UD	132	(30)
2022	Albacete	19	(8)
2022–2024	Córdoba	68	(13)
2024–2026	Zamora	71	(18)
2026–	CD Extremadura	5	(0)
- * Club domestic league appearances and goals as of 15:29, 30 September 2026 (UTC)

Enrique "Kike" Márquez Climent (born 23 July 1989) is a Spanish footballer who plays mainly as a left winger for Primera Federación club CD Extremadura.

== Club career ==
Born in Sanlúcar de Barrameda, Province of Cádiz, Márquez played youth football with local club Atlético Sanluqueño CF, making his senior debut in the 2006–07 season in the Tercera División. After returning to youth football with Villarreal CF, he joined UD Almería B also in the fourth division.

Márquez left the Andalusians after two years (achieving promotion in his second), signing with another reserve team and also in his native region, Recreativo de Huelva B. On 26 September 2010, he made his first Segunda División appearance with the main squad, starting in a 1–1 away draw against SD Ponferradina.

In June 2011, Márquez moved to Segunda División B side Betis Deportivo Balompié. He continued to compete in that tier the following campaigns, representing Sanluqueño, Cádiz CF, Racing de Ferrol, Marbella FC and Extremadura UD. He achieved promotion to division two in 2018 with the latter, contributing ten goals to this feat.

Márquez left Extremadura in January 2022 as the club was experiencing severe financial problems, and subsequently represented Primera Federación sides Albacete Balompié and Córdoba CF, promoting with both but leaving before playing in that level. He remained in the league in the 2024–25 campaign, on a one-year contract at Zamora CF.

On 25 June 2026, aged 37, Márquez joined the renamed CD Extremadura.
