= Christos Belevonis =

Greek footballer (born 2002)

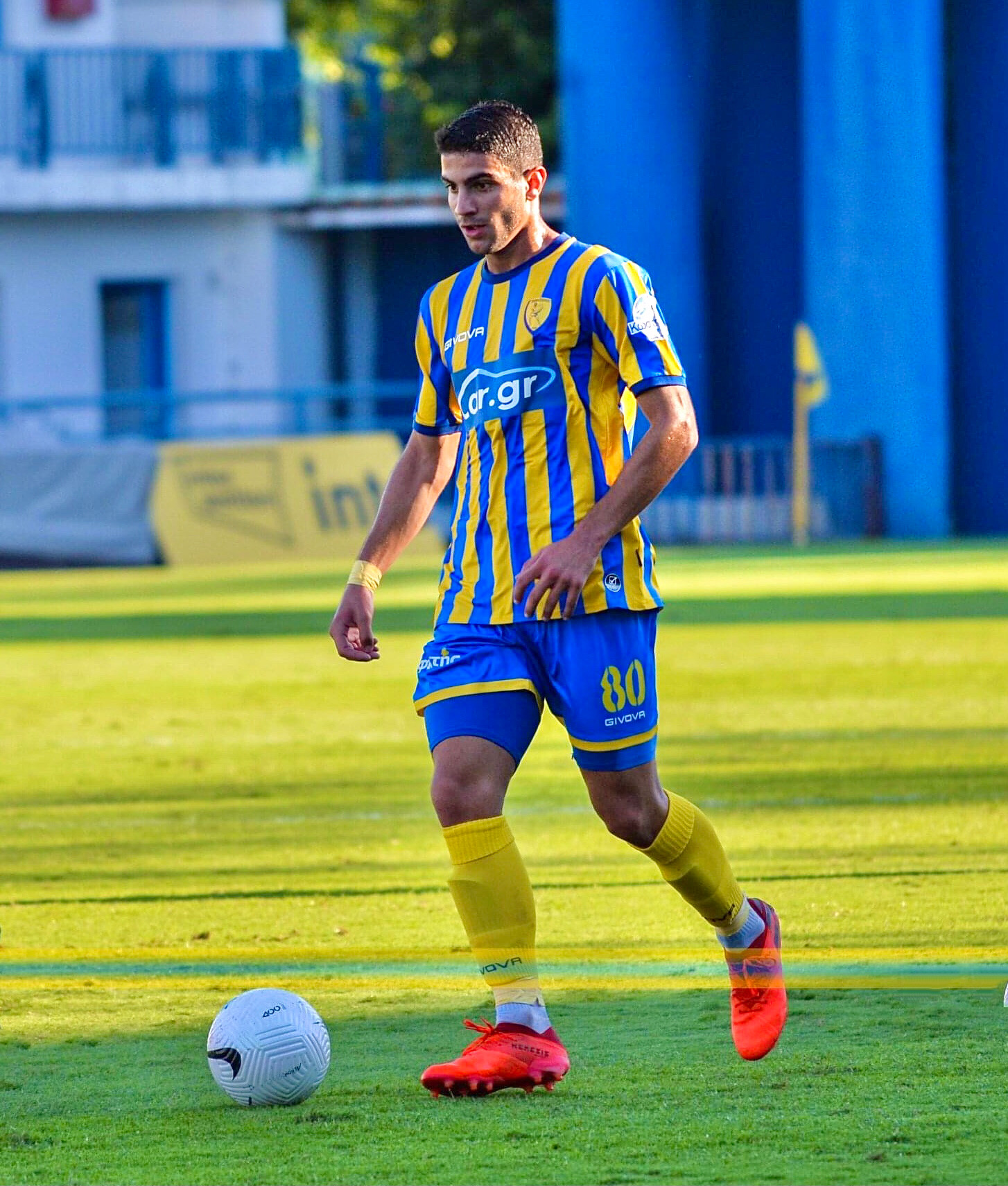
- Belevonis with Panetolikos in 2020

Personal information
- Date of birth: 29 July 2002 (age 24)
- Place of birth: Heraklion, Crete, Greece
- Height: 1.83 m (6 ft 0 in)
- Position: Midfielder

Team information
- Current team: Teruel

Youth career
- 2007–2020: Panetolikos

Senior career*
Years	Team	Apps	(Gls)
2020–2026	Panetolikos	57	(1)
2020–2021	→ Episkopi (loan)	0	(0)
2021	→ Karaiskakis (loan)	2	(0)
2022–2023	→ Veria (loan)	27	(3)
2026–	Teruel	0	(0)

International career^{‡}
2017–2018	Greece U16	7	(0)
2019	Greece U17	7	(1)
2022–2024	Greece U21	7	(0)
- * Club domestic league appearances and goals as of 14 June 2026 ‡ National team caps and goals as of 11 October 2024

Christos Belevonis (Greek: Χρήστος Μπελεβώνης; born 29 July 2002) is a Greek professional footballer who plays as a midfielder for Primera Federación club Teruel.

== Career statistics ==
=== Club ===
As of 7 August 2024

Appearances and goals by club, season and competition
Club	Season	League			National Cup		Total	
Club	Season	Division	Apps	Goals	Apps	Goals	Apps	Goals
Panetolikos	2019-20	Super League Greece	1	0	—		1	0
Panetolikos	2020-21	Super League Greece	0	0	—		0	0
Panetolikos	2021-22	Super League Greece	11	0	3	0	14	0
Panetolikos	2022-23	Super League Greece	0	0	—		0	0
Panetolikos	2023-24	Super League Greece	7	0	2	0	9	0
Panetolikos	Total		19	0	5	0	24	0
Karaiskakis (loan)	2020-21	Super League Greece 2	2	0	—		2	0
Veria (loan)	2022-23	Super League Greece 2	27	3	1	0	28	3
Career Total			48	3	6	0	54	3
