= Aitor Martínez (footballer) =

Spanish football manager (born 1985)

Personal information
- Full name: Aitor Martínez Medina
- Date of birth: 10 January 1985 (age 41)
- Place of birth: Terrassa, Spain
- Height: 1.80 m (5 ft 11 in)
- Position: Midfielder

Youth career
- 1999–2003: Barcelona

Senior career*
Years	Team	Apps	(Gls)
2003–2005	Barcelona C	51	(3)
2005–2006	Conquense	6	(0)
2006–2007	Puertollano	19	(0)
2007–2008	Ceuta	38	(0)
2008–2009	Atlético Ciudad	36	(3)
2009–2010	Ceuta	33	(1)
2010–2011	Roquetas	34	(3)
2011–2012	Ceuta	31	(3)
2012–2013	Sant Andreu	33	(0)
Total		281	(10)

Managerial career
- 2013–2018: Málaga (youth)
- 2019: Loreto
- 2019–2022: Betis (youth)
- 2022–2023: Betis B
- 2024: Torre del Mar
- 2024: Sanluqueño
- 2026: Real Ávila
- 2026: Juventud Torremolinos
- * Club domestic league appearances and goals

Aitor Martínez Medina (born 10 January 1985) is a Spanish retired footballer who played as a midfielder, and is a current manager.

== Playing career ==
Known as just Aitor during his playing days, he was born in Terrassa, Barcelona, Catalonia, and represented FC Barcelona as a youth. He made his senior debut with the C-team in Tercera División, before moving to Segunda División B side UB Conquense in 2005.

In January 2006, after being rarely used, Aitor joined CD Puertollano in the fourth tier, helping in their promotion at the end of the season. Roughly one year later, he signed for AD Ceuta also in division three.

In 2008, Aitor agreed to a deal with CF Atlético Ciudad still in the third level, before returning to Ceuta in the following year. On 10 August 2010, he signed for CD Roquetas of the same category, before rejoining Ceuta for a third spell the following 23 July.

On 16 July 2012, Aitor moved to UE Sant Andreu also in the third division. He retired in the following year, aged just 28.

== Managerial career ==
Shortly after retiring, Martínez was named manager of Málaga CF's youth sides. He had a short spell in charge of Segunda Andaluza side UD Loreto in 2019, before joining the structure of Real Betis as manager of the Cadete squad.

In 2020, Martínez was named at the helm of the Juvenil squad, before being promoted to the reserves on 24 June 2022. He left the club on 9 June of the following year, as his contract was due to expire and would not be renewed.

On 7 May 2024, after nearly one year without a club, Martínez was appointed manager of Tercera Federación side UD Torre del Mar, replacing departed Alfonso Vera. He left after missing out promotion in the play-offs, and took over Atlético Sanluqueño CF in Primera Federación on 20 June.

Martínez was sacked by the Atletistas on 29 September 2024, after just six matches. On 3 February, after more than a year unemployed, he took over Real Ávila CF in division four, but left the club on 11 June.

On 22 June 2026, Martínez replaced Carlos Alós at the helm of Juventud de Torremolinos CF in the third tier, but was himself dismissed on 12 August, before the start of the season.

== Managerial statistics ==
As of 3 May 2026

Managerial record by team and tenure
Team	Nat	From	To	Record								Ref
Team	Nat	From	To	G	W	D	L	GF	GA	GD	Win %	Ref
Loreto	(Spain)	16 January 2019	6 June 2019	16	5	3	8	19	25	−6	31.25	
Betis B	(Spain)	24 June 2022	9 June 2023	34	11	11	12	34	35	−1	32.35	
Torre del Mar	(Spain)	7 May 2024	20 June 2024	3	0	2	1	1	2	−1	0.00	
Sanluqueño	(Spain)	20 June 2024	29 September 2024	6	1	2	3	7	14	−7	16.67	
Real Ávila	(Spain)	3 February 2026	11 June 2026	13	6	1	6	20	25	−5	46.15	
Juventud Torremolinos	(Spain)	22 June 2026	12 August 2026	0	0	0	0	0	0	+0	—	
Total				72	23	19	30	81	101	−20	31.94	—
