= Santi Borikó =

Equatoguinean footballer (born 2003)

Personal information
- Full name: José Santiago Borikó Saká
- Date of birth: 19 May 2003 (age 23)
- Place of birth: Barcelona, Spain
- Height: 1.86 m (6 ft 1 in)
- Position: Centre-back

Team information
- Current team: Teruel

Youth career
- Sant Joan Despí
- Hospitalet
- 2017–2020: EF Gavà
- 2020–2021: Sant Andreu
- 2021–2022: Unificación Bellvitge
- 2022: Europa

Senior career*
Years	Team	Apps	(Gls)
2022–2023	Europa B	20	(2)
2023–2024	Europa	19	(1)
2024–2025	Castellón B	23	(1)
2024–2026	Castellón	4	(0)
2025–2026	→ Arenas Getxo (loan)	24	(0)
2026–	Teruel	0	(0)

International career^{‡}
2025–	Equatorial Guinea	1	(0)
- * Club domestic league appearances and goals as of 9 June 2026 ‡ National team caps and goals as of 21 March 2025

José Santiago "Santi" Borikó Saká (born 19 May 2003) is a professional footballer who plays for Primera Federación club Teruel. Mainly a centre-back, he can also operate as a defensive midfielder. Born in Spain, he plays for the Equatorial Guinea national team.

== Club career ==
Born in Barcelona, Catalonia to Equatoguinean parents, Borikó represented FC Sant Joan Despí, CE L'Hospitalet, EF Gavà, UE Sant Andreu, UD Unificación Bellvitge and CE Europa as a youth; initially a forward at Hospi, he later moved back to midfield at Gavà before establishing himself as a centre-back at Europa.

After making his senior debut with the reserves in Primera Catalana, Borikó made his first team debut on 29 January 2023, coming on as a second-half substitute in a 2–0 Tercera Federación away loss to FE Grama. On 3 July, he was definitely promoted to the main squad, now in Segunda Federación.

On 12 July 2024, Borikó was transferred to CD Castellón, being initially assigned to the B-team in the fifth division. He made his professional debut on 14 December, replacing Gonzalo Pastor in a 4–1 Segunda División home routing of FC Cartagena.

On 20 August 2025, Borikó signed for Primera Federación club Arenas Club de Getxo on a one-year loan deal. Exactly one year later, he joined fellow league team Teruel.

== International career ==
On 15 March 2025, he received his first call up to the Equatorial Guinea national team, which he accepted. He made his debut six days later.
