= Relu =

Spanish footballer

Personal information
- Full name: José María Relucio Gallego
- Date of birth: 9 February 1998 (age 28)
- Place of birth: Madrid, Spain
- Height: 1.83 m (6 ft 0 in)
- Position: Midfielder

Team information
- Current team: Teruel
- Number: 14

Youth career
- 2006–2010: Real Madrid
- 2010–2013: Rayo Vallecano
- 2013–2017: Atlético Madrid

Senior career*
Years	Team	Apps	(Gls)
2017–2018	Alavés B	0	(0)
2017–2018	→ Trival Valderas (loan)	30	(2)
2018–2019	Alcorcón B	29	(0)
2019	Alcorcón	4	(0)
2019–2020	Borussia Dortmund II	6	(0)
2020–2021	Getafe B	22	(1)
2021–2022	Levante B	25	(1)
2022–2023	YF Juventus	12	(1)
2023	Cacereño	9	(0)
2023–2024	Villanovense	31	(2)
2024–2025	Yeclano	14	(1)
2025	Sestao River	18	(1)
2025–	Teruel	35	(0)
- * Club domestic league appearances and goals as of 10 June 2026

José María Relucio Gallego (born 9 February 1998), commonly known as Relu, is a Spanish footballer who plays for Primera Federación club Teruel as a midfielder.

== Club career ==
Born in Madrid, Relu represented Real Madrid, Rayo Vallecano and Atlético Madrid as a youth. In July 2017, he agreed to a move to Internazionale, but the deal was later called off and he joined Deportivo Alavés instead, being loaned to Tercera División side CF Trival Valderas on 24 August.

Relu made his senior debut on 3 September 2017, playing the last 11 minutes in a 1–1 away draw against CF Pozuelo de Alarcón. He scored his first goal on 3 December, netting the opener in a 2–2 home draw against CDF Tres Cantos.

In September 2018, Relu agreed to a contract with AD Alcorcón, being initially assigned to B-team also in the fourth tier. He made his professional debut the following 24 March, coming on as a second-half substitute for Richard Boateng in a 1–3 loss at Elche CF in the Segunda División.

On 21 June 2019, after only four first-team matches, Relu signed for Bundesliga side Borussia Dortmund, being initially assigned to the reserves. On 14 July 2020, after having his appearances limited due to a knee injury, he returned to his home country and joined Getafe CF's B-team in the Segunda División B.

On 3 February 2023, Relu was announced at Cacereño.

On 10 July 2023, Relu was announced at Villanovense.
