= CD Extremadura =

Spanish football club

- Full name: Club Deportivo Extremadura, S.A.D.
- Founded: 9 June 2022; 4 years ago
- Stadium: Estadio Francisco de la Hera
- Capacity: 11,580
- President: Daniel Tafur
- Head coach: David Rocha
- League: Primera Federación – Group 1
- 2025–26: Segunda Federación – Group 4, 1st of 18 (champions)
- Website: http://www.cdextremadura.es
Home colours	Away colours

Club Deportivo Extremadura, S.A.D., formerly known as CD Extremadura 1924 and known as simply Extremadura, is a Spanish professional football club from the city of Almendralejo, in the autonomous community of Extremadura. They play in Primera Federación – Group 1, holding home games at the Estadio Francisco de la Hera.

The club was founded in June 2022 as a replacement for the folded Extremadura UD, who disappeared due to serious financial problems, which resulted in them being expelled from the Primera División RFEF.

== History ==
Club Deportivo Extremadura 1924 was founded in 2022 by Spanish businessman Daniel Tafur as the successor of the dissolved Extremadura UD. Since its relaunch, the team has achieved three consecutive promotions, rising from Spain’s seventh tier to Segunda Federación – the fourth tier of football in Spain, in which it will compete in the 2025-26 season.

The team began its debut season in 2022 in Group 5 of the 7th tier of football in Spain, with their first-ever match being a commanding 4-0 victory over EMD Aceuchal B. Performances similar to that match continued, and, in doing so, they won their Segunda Extremeña group and participated in the promotion play-offs with a chance of promotion to the Primera Extremeña. By beating AD Hispanolusa in the second phase of the play-offs, they achieved an instant promotion to the 1st Regional Tier in May 2023.

In January 2024, the club became a Sociedad Anónima Deportiva and changed its name to Club Deportivo Extremadura, removing the year "1924" from their name. In May, Extremadura achieved promotion to Tercera Federación; after finishing first of the group 4, they defeated CP Chinato 3–2 on aggregate in the promotion play-offs.

On 31 August 2024, Extremadura won the Extremaduran stage of the Copa Federación after beating Castuera 2–1 in the final. Three months later, on 13 November 2024, Extremadura became champions of the national stage of the Copa Federación after defeating Compostela in the final, becoming the lowest-ranked team in Spain to win the competition.

In April 2025, after finishing first in Group 14 of the Tercera Federación, Extremadura earned automatic promotion to the 2025–26 Segunda Federación as group champions. The club later finished top of Group 4 to secure promotion to the Primera Federación, and in May 2026 Thibaut Courtois became co-owner of the club through the investment group NXTPLAY.

== Stadium ==
CD Extremadura holds its home games at the Estadio Francisco de la Hera with a capacity of 11,580, located in the city center of Almendralejo.

== Predecessor ==
Extremadura became a member of the Spanish League in 1924 with the creation of Extremadura Football Federation. Subsequently playing most of their history between the third and second divisions, the club achieved a consistent stay in the latter level during the late 1990s. The club reached its heyday in 1997 and 1999, seasons in which it achieved promotion to Spain’s La Liga First Division.

== Season to season ==
Season	Tier	Division	Place	Copa del Rey
2022–23	7	2ª Ext.	1st	
2023–24	6	1ª Ext.	1st	
2024–25	5	3ª Fed.	1st	First round
2025–26	4	2ª Fed.	1st	Second round
2026–27	3	1ª Fed.		TBD

- 1 season in Primera Federación
- 1 season in Segunda Federación
- 1 season in Tercera Federación

== Players ==
=== First team squad ===
As of 4 November 2026

Note: Flags indicate national team as defined under FIFA eligibility rules; some limited exceptions apply. Players may hold more than one non-FIFA nationality.

No.	Pos.	Nation	Player
1	GK	ESP	David Pinto
2	DF	MAR	Ismael Bekhoucha
3	DF	ESP	Carlos Cordero
4	DF	ESP	Rober Correa
5	DF	ESP	Sergi Molina
6	MF	ESP	Yael Ballesteros
7	MF	ESP	Imanol Barace
8	MF	URU	Gio Zarfino
9	FW	ESP	Rodrigo Escudero
10	MF	ESP	Kike Márquez
11	MF	ESP	Marco Manchón
12	MF	MAR	Nordin Al-Lal (on loan from Elche)

No.	Pos.	Nation	Player
13	GK	ESP	Alfonso Liceras
14	DF	ESP	Diego Espejo
16	MF	MNE	Luka Lečić
17	FW	ESP	Chus Villar
18	DF	ESP	Edu Sánchez
19	FW	DEN	Alfred Gøthler (on loan from Leganés)
20	FW	ESP	Iker Burgos
21	DF	ESP	Álex Macías
22	MF	ESP	Héctor Areosa (on loan from Deportivo A Coruña)
23	MF	ESP	Diego Manuel
24	MF	ESP	Luis Nicolás

=== Youth team ===
Note: Flags indicate national team as defined under FIFA eligibility rules; some limited exceptions apply. Players may hold more than one non-FIFA nationality.

No.	Pos.	Nation	Player
30	MF	ESP	Hugo Marín
33	MF	ESP	Saúl Álvarez
