= Kike Carrasco =

Spanish footballer (born 1998)

Personal information
- Full name: Luis Enrique Carrasco Acosta
- Date of birth: 2 March 1998 (age 28)
- Place of birth: Almendralejo, Spain
- Height: 1.70 m (5 ft 7 in)
- Positions: Right back; winger

Team information
- Current team: Minera
- Number: 16

Youth career
- Extremadura
- 2013–2017: Rayo Vallecano

Senior career*
| Years | Team | Apps | (Gls) |
| 2017–2018 | Alavés B | 0 | (0) |
| 2017–2018 | → Novelda (loan) | 24 | (1) |
| 2018–2019 | Montijo | 32 | (1) |
| 2019–2020 | Extremadura B | 18 | (2) |
| 2020 | Extremadura | 6 | (1) |
| 2020–2022 | Cádiz B | 48 | (4) |
| 2022–2024 | Sanluqueño | 53 | (4) |
| 2024 | Alcoyano | 13 | (0) |
| 2024–2025 | San Fernando | 31 | (0) |
| 2025– | Minera | 32 | (3) |
- * Club domestic league appearances and goals as of 7 May 2026

Luis Enrique "Kike" Carrasco Acosta (born 2 March 1998) is a Spanish footballer who plays as either a right back or a right winger for Segunda Federación club Minera.

== Club career ==
Born in Almendralejo, Extremadura, Carrasco joined Rayo Vallecano's youth setup in 2013, from hometown side Extremadura UD. In July 2017, after finishing his formation, he joined Deportivo Alavés, being initially assigned to the reserves in the Tercera División, but was subsequently loaned to fellow league team Novelda CF.

Carrasco made his senior debut on 9 September 2017, starting in a 2–0 away win against CF Recambios Colón. The following 20 August, he signed for UD Montijo also in the fourth division.

On 27 August 2019, Carrasco returned to his first team Extremadura, being assigned to the B-side still in division four. He made his first team debut on 28 June of the following year, coming on as a late substitute for José Pardo in a 1–1 away draw against CF Fuenlabrada in the Segunda División.

Carrasco scored his first professional goal on 17 July 2020, netting the opener in a 2–0 home success over Sporting de Gijón. On 25 August, he signed for Cádiz CF, newly promoted to La Liga, and was assigned to the B-team in division three.
