= Juan Marrero =

Spanish footballer and manager

Personal information
- Full name: Juan Marrero Roig
- Date of birth: 24 March 1968 (age 58)
- Place of birth: Valencia, Spain
- Height: 1.86 m (6 ft 1 in)
- Position: Centre back

Youth career
- Valencia

Senior career*
Years	Team	Apps	(Gls)
1986–1988	Mestalla		
1988–1990	Olímpic Xàtiva	65	(1)
1990–1993	Mérida	70	(0)
1993–1994	Levante	33	(0)
1994–1996	Almería	31	(2)
1996–1997	Andorra	22	(1)
1997–2000	Cacereño	93	(1)
Total		317	(5)

Managerial career
- 2000–2008: Imperio Mérida
- 2008–2010: Extremadura
- 2011–2014: Arroyo
- 2015–2016: Extremadura
- 2017–2018: Badajoz
- 2018–2019: Córdoba B
- 2019–2020: Extremadura B
- 2020–2023: Montijo
- 2023–2025: Don Benito
- 2025: Badajoz
- * Club domestic league appearances and goals

Juan Marrero Roig (born 24 March 1968) is a Spanish retired footballer who played as a central defender, and is a current manager.

== Playing career ==
Born in Valencia, Marrero represented Valencia CF as a youth. After making his senior debut with the reserves, he joined Segunda División B side CD Olímpic de Xàtiva in 1988.

After being a regular starter for Olímpic, Marrero moved to fellow league team CP Mérida in 1990, and achieved promotion to Segunda División in the end of the season. He made his debut in the category on 22 September 1991, coming on as a half-time substitute in a 1–1 home draw against Racing de Santander.

After leaving Mérida in 1993, Marrero continued to appear in the third division until the end of his career, representing Levante UD, UD Almería, FC Andorra and CP Cacereño. He retired with the latter in 2000, aged just 32.

== Managerial career ==
Marrero began his career with Imperio de Mérida CP in 2000, achieving promotion to Tercera División in his first season in charge. In July 2008 he was appointed manager of Extremadura UD, and achieved their first-ever promotion to the third division in the end of the 2009–10 campaign.

Marrero was sacked on 23 November 2010, with his side being second from the bottom in the table. The following 8 June, he was named Arroyo CP manager.

Marrero took the club to the third tier for the first time ever in 2012, but resigned on 12 January 2014. In April 2015 he returned to Extremadura, but left in June of the following year after achieving another promotion.

On 9 March 2017, Marrero was appointed CD Badajoz manager. On 18 June of the following year, he was named at the helm of Córdoba CF B.

On 8 July 2019, Marrero returned to Extremadura after being appointed manager of the B-team.
