= CD Teruel =

Association football club in Spain

Coordinates: 40.332075°N 1.105865°W

Teruel
- Full name: Club Deportivo Teruel
- Nickname: El Torico
- Founded: 14 July 1954; 72 years ago
- Stadium: Pinilla
- Capacity: 4,500
- President: Santiago Gonzalvo
- Head coach: Dani González
- League: Primera Federación – Group 2
- 2025–26: Primera Federación – Group 2, 13th of 20
- Website: cdteruel.com
| Home colours | Away colours |

Club Deportivo Teruel is a Spanish football team based in Teruel, in the autonomous community of Aragon. Founded in 1954, the club plays in the Primera Federación – Group 2, and holds home games at Estadio Pinilla, with a capacity of 4,500 seats.

== History ==
Founded in 1954, the club spent two seasons in Tercera Regional, the lowest category of the region, before taking SD Montañesa's place in Tercera División. It first reached Segunda División B in 1987.

On 13 June 2018, Teruel signed a collaboration agreement with SD Huesca for three years.

== Season to season ==
| Season | Tier | Division | Place | Copa del Rey |
|---|---|---|---|---|
| 1954–55 | 6 | 3ª Reg. | | |
| 1955–56 | 6 | 3ª Reg. | | |
| 1956–57 | 3 | 3ª | 3rd | |
| 1957–58 | 3 | 3ª | 12th | |
| 1958–59 | 3 | 3ª | 8th | |
| 1959–60 | 3 | 3ª | 11th | |
| 1960–61 | 3 | 3ª | 13th | |
| 1961–62 | 3 | 3ª | 12th | |
| 1962–63 | 3 | 3ª | 10th | |
| 1963–64 | 3 | 3ª | 15th | |
| 1964–65 | 3 | 3ª | 14th | |
| 1965–66 | 3 | 3ª | 4th | |
| 1966–67 | 3 | 3ª | 8th | |
| 1967–68 | 3 | 3ª | 3rd | |
| 1968–69 | 3 | 3ª | 5th | |
| 1969–70 | 3 | 3ª | 19th | |
| 1970–71 | 4 | Reg. Pref. | 6th | |
| 1971–72 | 4 | Reg. Pref. | 17th | |
| 1972–73 | 5 | 1ª Reg. | 3rd | |
| 1973–74 | 4 | Reg. Pref. | 8th | |

| Season | Tier | Division | Place | Copa del Rey |
|---|---|---|---|---|
| 1974–75 | 4 | Reg. Pref. | 17th | |
| 1975–76 | 4 | Reg. Pref. | 16th | |
| 1976–77 | 4 | Reg. Pref. | 7th | |
| 1977–78 | 5 | Reg. Pref. | 2nd | |
| 1978–79 | 5 | Reg. Pref. | 9th | |
| 1979–80 | 5 | Reg. Pref. | 7th | |
| 1980–81 | 5 | Reg. Pref. | 6th | |
| 1981–82 | 5 | Reg. Pref. | 6th | |
| 1982–83 | 5 | Reg. Pref. | 14th | |
| 1983–84 | 5 | Reg. Pref. | 1st | |
| 1984–85 | 4 | 3ª | 4th | |
| 1985–86 | 4 | 3ª | 3rd | Second round |
| 1986–87 | 4 | 3ª | 2nd | First round |
| 1987–88 | 3 | 2ª B | 12th | Third round |
| 1988–89 | 3 | 2ª B | 4th | First round |
| 1989–90 | 3 | 2ª B | 16th | |
| 1990–91 | 3 | 2ª B | 20th | First round |
| 1991–92 | 4 | 3ª | 7th | First round |
| 1992–93 | 4 | 3ª | 6th | |
| 1993–94 | 4 | 3ª | 5th | |

| Season | Tier | Division | Place | Copa del Rey |
|---|---|---|---|---|
| 1994–95 | 4 | 3ª | 5th | |
| 1995–96 | 4 | 3ª | 5th | |
| 1996–97 | 4 | 3ª | 8th | |
| 1997–98 | 4 | 3ª | 5th | |
| 1998–99 | 4 | 3ª | 6th | |
| 1999–2000 | 4 | 3ª | 5th | |
| 2000–01 | 4 | 3ª | 1st | |
| 2001–02 | 4 | 3ª | 2nd | First round |
| 2002–03 | 4 | 3ª | 5th | |
| 2003–04 | 4 | 3ª | 9th | |
| 2004–05 | 4 | 3ª | 12th | |
| 2005–06 | 4 | 3ª | 15th | |
| 2006–07 | 4 | 3ª | 6th | |
| 2007–08 | 4 | 3ª | 3rd | |
| 2008–09 | 4 | 3ª | 3rd | |
| 2009–10 | 4 | 3ª | 1st | |
| 2010–11 | 3 | 2ª B | 12th | Second round |
| 2011–12 | 3 | 2ª B | 11th | |
| 2012–13 | 3 | 2ª B | 18th | |
| 2013–14 | 4 | 3ª | 2nd | |

| Season | Tier | Division | Place | Copa del Rey |
|---|---|---|---|---|
| 2014–15 | 4 | 3ª | 2nd | Second round |
| 2015–16 | 4 | 3ª | 4th | |
| 2016–17 | 4 | 3ª | 5th | |
| 2017–18 | 4 | 3ª | 1st | |
| 2018–19 | 3 | 2ª B | 17th | First round |
| 2019–20 | 4 | 3ª | 2nd | |
| 2020–21 | 4 | 3ª | 1st / 1st | First round |
| 2021–22 | 4 | 2ª RFEF | 4th | |
| 2022–23 | 4 | 2ª Fed. | 1st | First round |
| 2023–24 | 3 | 1ª Fed. | 17th | First round |
| 2024–25 | 4 | 2ª Fed. | 5th | |
| 2025–26 | 3 | 1ª Fed. | 13th | First round |
| 2026–27 | 3 | 1ª Fed. | | |

- 3 seasons in Primera Federación
- 8 seasons in Segunda División B
- 3 seasons in Segunda Federación/Segunda División RFEF
- 43 seasons in Tercera División

== Current squad ==
As of 5 November 2026

Note: Flags indicate national team as defined under FIFA eligibility rules; some limited exceptions apply. Players may hold more than one non-FIFA nationality.

| No. | Pos. | Nation | Player |
|---|---|---|---|
| 1 | GK | ESP | Alejandro Palop |
| 2 | DF | ESP | Andrés Borge |
| 3 | DF | ESP | Joserra |
| 4 | DF | ESP | Pablo Felipe |
| 5 | DF | ESP | Goyo Medina |
| 6 | DF | NGR | Nathaniel Nicholas |
| 7 | FW | ESP | Sergio Moreno |
| 8 | MF | ESP | Miguel Romera |
| 9 | FW | GRE | Panagiotis Moraitis |
| 10 | MF | ESP | Hugo Redón |
| 11 | FW | ESP | Eduardo Gallardo |

| No. | Pos. | Nation | Player |
|---|---|---|---|
| 14 | MF | ESP | Relu |
| 15 | DF | ESP | Álvaro López |
| 16 | MF | ESP | Haritz Albisua |
| 18 | MF | GRE | Christos Belevonis |
| 20 | MF | ESP | Sander Ballero |
| 21 | FW | ESP | Mario Sesé |
| 22 | DF | ESP | Luis Llácer |
| 24 | DF | GEQ | Santi Borikó |
| 25 | GK | ESP | Amador Zarco |
| 28 | MF | ESP | Carlos Igual |

=== Reserve team ===
Note: Flags indicate national team as defined under FIFA eligibility rules; some limited exceptions apply. Players may hold more than one non-FIFA nationality.

| No. | Pos. | Nation | Player |
|---|---|---|---|
| 29 | FW | ESP | José Luis Calvé |

== Honours ==
- Tercera División
  - Champions (3): 2000–01, 2009–10, 2017–18

== Famous players ==
- (Equatorial Guinea) Raúl Fabiani
- (Equatorial Guinea) David Mitogo
- (Equatorial Guinea) Sena
- (Equatorial Guinea) Sipo
- (Spain) Luis Milla
- (Spain) Javier Oliete
