= Lele (footballer) =

Spanish footballer

Personal information
- Full name: Adrián Torres Lázaro
- Date of birth: 3 April 1998 (age 28)
- Place of birth: Arroyomolinos, Spain
- Height: 1.72 m (5 ft 8 in)
- Position: Winger

Team information
- Current team: Extremadura
- Number: 14

Youth career
- Leganés
- 2013–2018: Getafe

Senior career*
Years	Team	Apps	(Gls)
2015	Getafe B	1	(1)
2017–2018	Internacional Madrid	33	(5)
2018–2019	Leganés B	14	(0)
2019	Alcorcón B	13	(0)
2019–2020	Extremadura B	27	(2)
2020–	Extremadura	15	(0)
- * Club domestic league appearances and goals as of 4 April 2021

Adrián Torres Lázaro (born 3 April 1998), commonly known as Lele, is a Spanish professional footballer who plays for Extremadura UD. Mainly a left winger, he can also play as an attacking midfielder.

== Club career ==
Born in Arroyomolinos, Madrid, Lele represented CD Leganés and Getafe CF as a youth. On 10 May 2015, aged just 17, he made his senior debut with the latter's reserves by coming on as a second-half substitute and scoring the equalizer in a 2–2 Segunda División B away draw against Barakaldo CF.

On 21 August 2017, after finishing his formation, Lele signed for Tercera División side Internacional de Madrid, helping in the club's promotion campaign with five goals. On 10 July 2018, he moved back to former club Leganés, and was assigned to the B-team also in the fourth division.

On 1 February 2019, Lele agreed to a contract with another reserve team, AD Alcorcón B, still in division four. On 9 July, he moved to Extremadura UD, being initially assigned to the B-team in the same category.

Lele made his professional debut on 7 July 2020, replacing José Pardo late into a 0–1 home loss against Cádiz CF in the Segunda División.
