= Manu Mosquera =

Spanish footballer

Personal information
- Full name: Manuel Mosquera Rey
- Date of birth: 26 January 1999 (age 27)
- Place of birth: A Coruña, Spain
- Position: Forward

Team information
- Current team: Silva

Youth career
- 2009–2018: Deportivo La Coruña

Senior career*
Years	Team	Apps	(Gls)
2018–2019	Laracha	23	(6)
2019–2021	Deportivo B	15	(2)
2019	→ Extremadura C (loan)	1	(0)
2019–2020	→ Extremadura B (loan)	11	(2)
2020	→ Extremadura (loan)	5	(0)
2021	Deportivo La Coruña	1	(0)
2021–2022	Cacereño	4	(0)
2022	Ourense CF	9	(1)
2022–2023	Victoria		
2023–2024	Arzúa	17	(1)
2024–	Silva	4	(0)
- * Club domestic league appearances and goals as of 12 October 2024

Manuel "Manu" Mosquera Rey (born 26 January 1999) is a Spanish professional footballer who plays as a forward for Silva.

== Club career ==
Born in A Coruña, Galicia, Mosquera joined Deportivo de La Coruña's youth setup in 2009, aged ten. In 2018, after finishing his formation, he was assigned to farm team Laracha CF of the Tercera División, and made his senior debut on 30 September of that year by coming on as a late substitute in a 1–0 home win over RC Villalbés.

Mosquera scored his first senior goal on 17 November 2018, netting the equalizer in a 1–1 draw at Silva SD. After being a regular starter for Laracha, he made his debut for Dépor's reserves on 19 May 2019, playing the last 19 minutes in a 0–1 Segunda División B away loss against Real Valladolid B, as his side was already relegated.

On 7 December 2019, Mosquera moved to Extremadura UD on loan, being initially assigned to the B-team also in the fourth division. After the COVID-19 pandemic, he was included in the first-team squad for training, and made his professional debut on 12 June 2020, replacing Víctor Pastrana late into a 1–1 away draw against Elche CF in the Segunda División.

== Personal life ==
Mosquera's father, also named Manuel, was also a footballer and a forward. He too was groomed at Deportivo, and both were together at Extremadura.
