= Dani González (football manager) =

Spanish football manager

Personal information
- Full name: Daniel González Martínez
- Date of birth: (age 43–44)
- Place of birth: Teruel, Spain

Team information
- Current team: Teruel (manager)

Managerial career
- Years: Team
- Teruel (youth)
- 2015–2017: Fuensport
- 2017–2019: Atlético Teruel
- 2019–2020: Albuixech
- 2020–2021: Teruel (youth)
- 2021–2022: Calamocha B
- 2022: Calamocha
- 2022–2023: CFP Castalia (youth)
- 2023–2024: Monreal
- 2026: Teruel (assistant)
- 2026: Teruel (caretaker)
- 2026–: Teruel

Daniel "Dani" González Martínez is a Spanish football manager and former player. He is the current manager of CD Teruel.

== Career ==
Born in Teruel, Aragon, González quit playing in 2009, and had his first managerial experiences with amateur sides CD Fuensport, Atlético Teruel and CF Albuixech, mostly in the Regional Preferente. He left the latter side in April 2021, and joined the structure of CF Calamocha in August, helping in the creation of a football school while also being named in charge of their B-team.

On 21 February 2022, González was appointed manager of Calamocha's first team in Tercera División RFEF. After narrowly avoiding relegation, he left on 28 May, and joined the structure of CD Castellón in August, being named in charge of the Cadete A squad of affiliate team CF Promeses Castalia.

In 2024, after another year at amateur side CF Monreal, González joined the staff of CD Teruel as match delegate, before becoming a technical assistant on 21 January 2026. On 17 June, he was named Kiko Ramírez's assistant, before being named caretaker manager on 30 October.

Despite leading the side on two Primera Federación winless matches (a 2–0 loss to UE Sant Andreu and a 1–1 draw against UD Ibiza), González was confirmed as manager of Teruel on 13 November 2026.
