= Giovanni Zarfino =

Uruguayan footballer (born 1991)

Personal information
- Full name: Jorge Giovanni Zarfino Calandria
- Date of birth: 8 October 1991 (age 35)
- Place of birth: Montevideo, Uruguay
- Height: 1.83 m (6 ft 0 in)
- Position: Midfielder

Team information
- Current team: CD Extremadura
- Number: 8

Youth career
- Boston River

Senior career*
Years	Team	Apps	(Gls)
2011–2015	Boston River	95	(17)
2015–2017	Danubio	49	(3)
2017–2021	Extremadura UD	97	(12)
2020–2021	→ Tenerife (loan)	22	(1)
2021–2022	Alcorcón	29	(7)
2022–2024	Sporting Gijón	30	(3)
2025	Castellón	12	(0)
2025–	CD Extremadura	32	(12)
- * Club domestic league appearances and goals as of 15 May 2026

Jorge Giovanni Zarfino Calandria (born 8 October 1991) is a Uruguayan footballer who plays as a central midfielder for Spanish Segunda Federación club CD Extremadura.

== Club career ==
Born in Montevideo, Zarfino was a Boston River youth graduate. He made his senior debut on 12 October 2013, starting in a 0–0 home draw against Cerrito for the Uruguayan Segunda División championship.

Zarfino scored his first senior goal on 26 October 2013, netting the first in a 2–1 away win against Tacuarembó. On 30 June 2015, after featuring regularly, he moved to Primera División side Danubio.

Zarfino made his debut for Danubio on 11 August 2015, starting in a 0–1 Copa Sudamericana away loss against Universidad Católica. Five days later he made his first appearance in the main category, playing the full 90 minutes in a 2–0 win at Juventud de Las Piedras.

On 12 July 2017 Zarfino moved abroad for the first time in his career, after agreeing to a one-year loan deal with Argentine Primera División side Newell's Old Boys. However, the deal was cancelled by Danubio and he signed for Spanish Segunda División B side Extremadura UD on 5 August.

Zarfino helped in Extremadura's first-ever promotion to Segunda División in his first season, scoring three goals only in the play-offs, and was a regular starter afterwards. On 6 August 2020, after suffering relegation, he joined fellow second division side CD Tenerife on a one-year loan deal.

On 31 August 2021, free agent Zarfino signed a one-year deal with AD Alcorcón, still in the Spanish second division. On 8 July of the following year, after suffering relegation, he moved to fellow league team Sporting de Gijón on a two-year contract.

On 18 January 2025, Zarfino joined CD Castellón until the end of the season.
