= Manuel Mosquera (footballer, born 1968) =

Spanish footballer

Personal information
- Full name: Manuel Alfredo Mosquera Bastida
- Date of birth: 10 August 1968 (age 58)
- Place of birth: Oleiros, Spain
- Height: 1.73 m (5 ft 8 in)
- Position: Forward

Youth career
- Deportivo La Coruña

Senior career*
Years	Team	Apps	(Gls)
1988–1991	Deportivo B		
1989–1991	Deportivo La Coruña	21	(1)
1991–1996	Extremadura	171	(61)
1996–1998	Compostela	51	(3)
1998–2005	Extremadura	261	(39)
2005–2007	Cerceda	59	(13)
Total		563	(117)

Managerial career
- 2007: Cerceda (player-manager)
- 2007–2009: Cerceda (youth)
- 2009–2010: Cerceda B
- 2011–2014: Laracha
- 2014–2016: Deportivo B
- 2019–2020: Extremadura
- 2021–2022: Extremadura
- 2022: Talavera de la Reina
- 2023: Córdoba
- * Club domestic league appearances and goals

Manuel Alfredo Mosquera Bastida (born 10 August 1968) is a Spanish retired footballer who played as a forward, and is a manager.

== Playing career ==
Born in Oleiros, Galicia, Mosquera was a Deportivo de La Coruña youth graduate. After spending several seasons with the reserves in Tercera División, he made his first team debut on 26 November 1989, starting in a 1–0 Segunda División home win against Racing de Santander.

Mosquera scored his first professional goal on 2 December 1989, netting his team's second in a 3–1 away defeat of UD Las Palmas. After contributing with 20 appearances in his first season, he only featured in one match during his second, as his side achieved promotion to La Liga.

In 1991, Mosquera moved to CF Extremadura in Segunda División B, being a regular starter and achieving two promotions; in the latter one, to the first division, he scored a career-best 19 goals. On 29 October 1995, he scored a hat-trick in a 4–2 home success over Bilbao Athletic.

In June 1996, Mosquera agreed to a three-year contract with SD Compostela in the top tier. He made his debut in the category on 1 September, starting in a 0–6 loss at CD Tenerife, and scored his first goal the following 18 May in a 2–2 away draw against Real Oviedo.

In January 1998, Mosquera returned to his former side Extremadura, being an undisputed starter in the following seven-and-a-half seasons which the club achieved one promotion (to the first division in 1998) and subsequently suffered two relegations (in 1999 and 2002). In 2005 he joined CCD Cerceda in the fourth division, and represented the side for two full seasons before retiring at the age of 38.

== Managerial career ==
On 2 April 2007, while playing for Cerceda, Mosquera replaced Ramiro Sorbet at the helm of the first team, and acted as a player-manager until the end of the season. He subsequently took over the club's youth categories and the reserves in the regional leagues.

On 1 June 2011, Mosquera was appointed manager of Laracha CF in the fifth tier, and managed to achieve promotion to the fourth level in 2013; around that time, he also worked as manager of the Association of Spanish Footballers. On 18 June 2014, he returned to his first club Deportivo, being named manager of the B-team.

On 17 June 2016, Mosquera joined Dépor's staff as an assistant sporting director. On 27 February 2019, after more than two years without coaching, he took over the renamed Extremadura UD in the second division, replacing fired Rodri. He kept the club up before the end of the season, but they suffered relegation in July 2020, after which he expressed a desire to continue in the job.

Mosquera was sacked on 22 November 2020 due to poor results, but was again appointed manager the following 5 January after a change in the club's internal structure. On 5 April 2022, after the club was officially expelled from the league, he left and took over fellow Primera División RFEF side CF Talavera de la Reina three days later.

On 2 June 2022, after Talavera's relegation, Mosquera left the club. The following 10 April, he replaced Germán Crespo at the helm of Córdoba CF also in division three.

== Personal life ==
Mosquera's son, also named Manuel, is also a footballer and a forward. He too was groomed at Deportivo, and played under him at Extremadura.

== Managerial statistics ==
As of match played 27 May 2023

Managerial record by team and tenure
Team	Nat	From	To	Record								Ref
Team	Nat	From	To	G	W	D	L	GF	GA	GD	Win %	Ref
Cerceda (player-manager)	(Spain)	2 April 2007	27 June 2007	8	1	2	5	8	13	−5	12.50	
Cerceda B	(Spain)	1 July 2009	30 June 2010	36	18	8	10	74	46	+28	50.00	
Laracha	(Spain)	1 June 2011	18 June 2014	113	48	32	33	164	142	+22	42.48	
Deportivo B	(Spain)	18 June 2014	17 June 2016	84	43	20	21	150	84	+66	51.19	
Extremadura	(Spain)	27 February 2019	22 November 2020	63	21	18	24	63	73	−10	33.33	
Extremadura	(Spain)	5 January 2021	2 March 2022	42	13	10	19	43	71	−28	30.95	
Talavera de la Reina	(Spain)	8 April 2022	2 June 2022	8	3	1	4	8	14	−6	37.50	
Córdoba	(Spain)	10 April 2023	28 June 2023	8	1	4	3	7	8	−1	12.50	
Total				362	148	95	119	517	451	+66	40.88	—
