= Raúl Llona =

Spanish footballer and manager

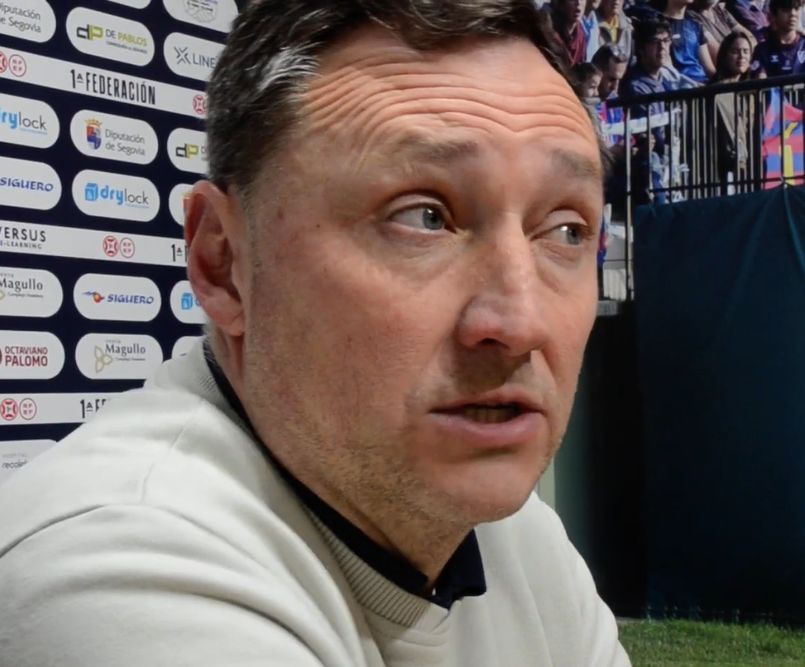
- Llona in 2025

Personal information
- Full name: Raúl Sáenz del Rincón
- Date of birth: 3 August 1976 (age 50)
- Place of birth: Logroño, Spain
- Height: 1.74 m (5 ft 9 in)
- Position: Midfielder

Team information
- Current team: Ibiza (manager)

Youth career
- Berceo

Senior career*
Years	Team	Apps	(Gls)
1993–1995	Berceo		
1995–1997	CD Logroñés B	68	(1)
1997	CD Logroñés	1	(0)
1997–1998	Manchego	36	(5)
1998–1999	Mensajero	30	(0)
1999–2000	Talavera	26	(2)
2000–2001	CD Logroñés		
2001–2003	Real Unión	46	(3)
2003–2004	Calahorra	15	(0)
2004–2007	CD Logroñés		

Managerial career
- 2007–2009: Peña Balsamaiso (youth)
- 2009–2013: Berceo (youth)
- 2013–2014: UD Logroñés
- 2014–2016: SD Logroñés
- 2016–2017: Anguiano
- 2017–2018: Alavés (youth)
- 2018–2021: San Ignacio
- 2021: Alavés B
- 2021–2023: SD Logroñés
- 2023–2025: Cultural Leonesa
- 2026–: Ibiza
- * Club domestic league appearances and goals

Raúl Sáenz del Rincón (born 3 August 1976), known as Raúl Llona or just Llona, is a Spanish retired footballer who played as a midfielder, and the current manager of UD Ibiza.

== Playing career ==
Born in Logroño, La Rioja, Llona started his career with CD Berceo before moving to CD Logroñés in 1995. On 22 June 1997, after two seasons as a starter with the reserves, he made his professional debut by playing the last 13 minutes of a 1–2 La Liga away loss against Real Sociedad.

Llona would spend the remainder of his career mainly in Segunda División B, representing CD Manchego, CD Mensajero, Talavera CF, Real Unión and CD Calahorra in that category. He also enjoyed two further spells with his first club Logroñés, with the side mainly in Tercera División, and retired with the side in 2007 at the age of 31.

== Managerial career ==
Immediately after retiring Llona took up coaching, managing Peña Balsamaiso CF's youth setup. In 2009, he returned to his first club Berceo, taking over the Juvenil squad while also working as a director of football.

In March 2013, Llona was appointed manager of UD Logroñés in the third division. On 6 June 2014, he took over neighbouring SD Logroñés, recently relegated to the fourth division.

On 23 June 2016, Llona was named in charge of fellow fourth tier club CD Anguiano. On 13 July of the following year, he joined Deportivo Alavés as manager of the Cadete B squad.

Llona was named Club San Ignacio manager in 2018, subsequently helping in their promotion to the fourth level. On 19 May 2020, he renewed as manager of San Ignacio until June 2022.

On 9 February 2021, Llona was appointed manager of Alavés' B-team, but was sacked exactly two months later. On 27 May, he returned to SD Logroñés, with the club now in Primera División RFEF.

Llona left Logroñés on 30 May 2023, and took over Cultural y Deportiva Leonesa two days later. On 4 June 2025, after leading the latter side to a promotion to Segunda División, he renewed his contract, but was sacked on 22 September.

On 12 June 2026, Llona was announced as manager of UD Ibiza back in division three.

== Managerial statistics ==
As of 30 October 2026

Managerial record by team and tenure
Team	Nat	From	To	Record								Ref
Team	Nat	From	To	G	W	D	L	GF	GA	GD	Win %	Ref
UD Logroñés	(Spain)	29 March 2013	15 May 2014	44	12	14	18	37	57	−20	27.27	
SD Logroñés	(Spain)	6 June 2014	22 June 2016	88	65	11	12	226	75	+151	73.86	
Anguiano	(Spain)	22 June 2016	13 July 2017	40	29	6	5	117	42	+75	72.50	
San Ignacio	(Spain)	1 July 2018	9 February 2021	82	31	31	20	120	83	+37	37.80	
Alavés B	(Spain)	9 February 2021	9 April 2021	8	1	1	6	10	17	−7	12.50	
SD Logroñés	(Spain)	27 May 2021	30 May 2023	77	25	24	28	84	88	−4	32.47	
Cultural Leonesa	(Spain)	1 June 2023	22 September 2025	86	35	28	23	104	89	+15	40.70	
Ibiza	(Spain)	12 June 2026	Present	10	5	2	3	17	13	+4	50.00	
Career total				435	203	117	115	715	464	+251	46.67	—
