= UD Ourense =

Coordinates: 42.340778°N 7.875796°W

- Full name: Unión Deportiva Ourense
- Nickname: Vermellos (Reds)
- Founded: 10 July 2014; 12 years ago
- Stadium: O Couto
- Capacity: 5,625
- President: Javier Orban
- Head coach: Agustín Ruiz
- League: Primera Federación – Group 1
- 2025–26: Segunda Federación – Group 1, 4th of 18 (promoted via play-offs)
- Website: https://udourense.com
Home colours	Away colours

Unión Deportiva Ourense is a Spanish football club based in Ourense, in the autonomous community of Galicia. Founded in 2014, it currently plays in Primera Federación – Group 1.

== History ==
UD Ourense (Unión Deportiva Ourense) was founded on July 10, 2014, with the aim of replacing dissolved CD Ourense. The club was immediately registered in the Register of Sports Entities of the Xunta de Galicia and in the Galician Football Federation. The club is owned and democratically run by its supporters.

In its first season, UD Ourense played in Tercera Autonómica (the eighth tier), the club won the 26 games played and finished as champion of the group 13, promoting to Segunda Autonómica. It repeated the success the next four seasons, reaching Tercera División.

== Season to season ==
Season	Tier	Division	Place	Copa del Rey
2014–15	8	3ª Aut.	1st	
2015–16	7	2ª Aut.	1st	
2016–17	6	1ª Gal.	2nd	
2017–18	5	Pref.	1st	
2018–19	4	3ª	8th	
2019–20	4	3ª	8th	
2020–21	4	3ª	10th / 5th	
2021–22	6	Pref.	1st	
2022–23	5	3ª Fed.	5th	
2023–24	5	3ª Fed.	4th	
2024–25	5	3ª Fed.	1st	
2025–26	4	2ª Fed.	4th	First round
2026–27	3	1ª Fed.		First round

- 1 season in Primera Federación
- 1 season in Segunda Federación
- 3 seasons in Tercera División
- 3 seasons in Tercera Federación

=== Detailed list of seasons ===
Season	League											Cup
Season	Tier	Division	Group	Pos	P	W	D	L	F	A	Pts	Cup
2014–15	8	3ª Aut.	13	1st	26	26	0	0	151	10	81	
2015–16	7	2ª Aut.	9	1st	34	28	2	4	135	37	86	
2016–17	6	1ª Gal.	4	2nd	34	26	4	4	86	26	82	
2017–18	5	Pref.	2	1st	38	23	10	5	70	29	79	
2018–19	4	3ª	1	8th	38	16	11	11	45	39	59	

== Players ==
As of 4 November 2026

Note: Flags indicate national team as defined under FIFA eligibility rules; some limited exceptions apply. Players may hold more than one non-FIFA nationality.

No.	Pos.	Nation	Player
1	GK	ESP	Manu Vizoso
2	DF	ESP	Varo Fernández
3	DF	ESP	Julio Cabrera
4	DF	ESP	Javi Labrada
5	DF	ESP	Lucas Puime
6	DF	ESP	Noel González
7	FW	ESP	Mateo Gandarillas
8	MF	ESP	Curro Rivelott
9	FW	ESP	Rufo Sánchez
10	FW	ESP	David Ferreiro
11	FW	ESP	Sergi Baldrich

No.	Pos.	Nation	Player
13	GK	ESP	Bruno Rielo
14	MF	ESP	Champi
16	MF	ESP	Álvaro Bastida
17	FW	ESP	Xabi Domínguez
18	FW	ESP	Cristian Carro (on loan from Celta)
19	DF	ESP	Samu Pardo
20	MF	VEN	Viti Nieves
21	DF	ESP	Igor Irazu
22	MF	ESP	Diego Tejón
23	MF	ESP	Roi Currás
24	FW	LTU	Romualdas Jansonas (on loan from Arouca)

=== Youth team ===
Note: Flags indicate national team as defined under FIFA eligibility rules; some limited exceptions apply. Players may hold more than one non-FIFA nationality.

No.	Pos.	Nation	Player
26	FW	ESP	Mauro Varela
28	FW	ESP	Iago Feijoo

=== Out on loan ===
Note: Flags indicate national team as defined under FIFA eligibility rules; some limited exceptions apply. Players may hold more than one non-FIFA nationality.

No.	Pos.	Nation	Player
—	DF	ESP	Santi Prado (at Lalín until 30 June 2027)
—	FW	ARG	Valen Jaichenko (at Sarriana until 30 June 2027)

== Women's team ==
The women's team of UD Ourense was created in 2015. Three years later, the club was retired due to the lack of players and support.

Season	Tier	Division	Place	Copa de la Reina
2015–16	4	2ª Reg.	2nd	
2016–17	3	1ª Reg	3rd	
2017–18	3	1ª Reg	8th	
