= Extremadura UD B =

Reserve team of Extremadura UD

Extremadura B
- Full name: Extremadura Unión Deportiva, S.A.D. "B"
- Founded: 1986 (as CA San José Promesas)
- Dissolved: 2022
- Ground: Tomás de la Hera; Almendralejo, Extremadura, Spain
- Capacity: 3,000
- President: (Spain) Manuel Franganillo
- Head coach: (Spain) Juan Marrero
- 2021–22: Tercera División RFEF – Group 14, 16th of 16 (disqualified)
Home colours	Away colours

Extremadura Unión Deportiva "B" was the reserve team of Extremadura UD, a Spanish football club based in Almendralejo, in the autonomous community of Extremadura. Founded in 1986 as Atlético San José Promesas it last played in Tercera División RFEF - Group 14, holding home games at Estadio Tomás de la Hera, with a 3,000-seat capacity.

== History ==
Founded in 1986, San José Promesas only started to have a senior team in 2004. On 21 June 2016, the club was integrated into the structure of Extremadura UD and became its reserve team. With the aim to respect its history, the club would be named also as Extremadura-San José and will continue wearing its classic mauve kit. In the following season, the reserve team was renamed to Extremadura B.

In March 2022, Extremadura B was expelled from the Tercera División RFEF after two consecutive no-shows. Shortly after, the club was dissolved along with the first team.

== Season to season ==
- As Club Atlético San José Promesas

Season	Tier	Division	Place	Copa del Rey
2004–05	6	1ª Reg.	2nd	
2005–06	5	Reg. Pref.	8th	
2006–07	5	Reg. Pref.	4th	
2007–08	5	Reg. Pref.	13th	
2008–09	5	Reg. Pref.	9th	
2009–10	5	Reg. Pref.	2nd	
2010–11	4	3ª	15th	
2011–12	4	3ª	17th	
2012–13	4	3ª	11th	
2013–14	4	3ª	12th	
2014–15	4	3ª	13th	
2015–16	4	3ª	11th	

- As Extremadura UD's reserve team

Season	Tier	Division	Place
2016–17	4	3ª	13th
2017–18	4	3ª	13th
2018–19	4	3ª	7th
2019–20	4	3ª	4th
2020–21	4	3ª	4th / 3rd
2021–22	5	3ª RFEF	(R)

- 11 seasons in Tercera División
- 1 season in Tercera División RFEF
