= Laracha CF =

Spanish football club

Coordinates: 43.250139°N 8.577086°W

Laracha
- Full name: Laracha Club de Fútbol
- Founded: 1965
- Dissolved: 2024
- Ground: Municipal Stadium; A Laracha, Galicia, Spain
- Capacity: 1,000
- Chairman: Juan José Fuentes
- 2023–24: Primeira Galicia – Group 1, withdrew
Home colours	Away colours

Laracha Club de Fútbol was a Spanish football team based in A Laracha, in the autonomous community of Galicia. Founded in 1965, it last played in Primeira Galicia – Group 1, holding home games at Estadio Municipal de Laracha, with a 1,000-seat capacity.

On 17 April 2024, Laracha withdrew from the competition after having just six players available in the squad. In July, the club was officially dissolved after ending its society.

== Season to season ==
Season	Tier	Division	Place	Copa del Rey
1965–66	5	1ª Reg.	7th	
1966–67	5	1ª Reg.	1st	
1967–68	5	1ª Reg.	1st	
1968–69	5	1ª Reg.	2nd	
1969–70	5	1ª Reg.	1st	
1970–71	5	1ª Reg.		
1971–72	6	2ª Reg.	2nd	
1972–73	6	2ª Reg.	3rd	
1973–74	6	2ª Reg.	1st	
1974–75	5	1ª Reg.	3rd	
1975–76	5	1ª Reg.	4th	
1976–77	5	1ª Reg.	5th	
1977–78	6	1ª Reg.	5th	
1978–79	7	2ª Reg.	11th	
1979–80	7	2ª Reg.	10th	
1980–81	7	2ª Reg.	11th	
1981–82	7	2ª Reg.	12th	
1982–83	7	2ª Reg.	8th	
1983–84	7	2ª Reg.	1st	
1984–85	6	1ª Reg.	18th	

Season	Tier	Division	Place	Copa del Rey
1985–86	7	2ª Reg.	2nd	
1986–87	6	1ª Reg.	7th	
1987–88	6	1ª Reg.	3rd	
1988–89	6	1ª Reg.	7th	
1989–90	6	1ª Reg.	5th	
1990–91	6	1ª Reg.	4th	
1991–92	6	1ª Reg.	1st	
1992–93	5	Reg. Pref.	7th	
1993–94	5	Reg. Pref.	9th	
1994–95	5	Reg. Pref.	8th	
1995–96	5	Reg. Pref.	8th	
1996–97	5	Reg. Pref.	1st	
1997–98	4	3ª	20th	
1998–99	5	Reg. Pref.	12th	
1999–2000	5	Reg. Pref.	3rd	
2000–01	5	Reg. Pref.	6th	
2001–02	5	Reg. Pref.	2nd	
2002–03	5	Reg. Pref.	3rd	
2003–04	5	Reg. Pref.	2nd	
2004–05	4	3ª	5th	

Season	Tier	Division	Place	Copa del Rey
2005–06	4	3ª	3rd	
2006–07	4	3ª	19th	
2007–08	5	Pref. Aut.	7th	
2008–09	5	Pref. Aut.	8th	
2009–10	5	Pref. Aut.	8th	
2010–11	5	Pref. Aut.	10th	
2011–12	5	Pref. Aut.	5th	
2012–13	5	Pref. Aut.	4th	
2013–14	4	3ª	15th	
2014–15	4	3ª	19th	

Season	Tier	Division	Place	Copa del Rey
2015–16	5	Pref.	9th	
2016–17	5	Pref.	2nd	
2017–18	4	3ª	15th	
2018–19	4	3ª	17th	N/A (Note: Second reserve team of Deportivo La Coruña.)
2019–20	5	Pref.	19th	N/A
2020–21	5	Pref.	7th	
2021–22	6	Pref.	11th	
2022–23	6	1ª Gal.	14th	
2023–24	6	1ª Gal.	(R)	

- 7 seasons in Tercera División
