= Primera Federación =

Spanish association football league

- Organising body: RFEF
- Founded: 2020; 6 years ago
- First season: 2021–22
- Country: Spain
- Divisions: 2
- Number of clubs: 2 groups of 20 teams each (40)
- Level on pyramid: 3
- Promotion to: Segunda División
- Relegation to: Segunda Federación
- Domestic cup(s): Copa del Rey; Copa Federación
- Current champions: CD Tenerife (Group A); CD Eldense (Group B) (2025–26)
- Most championships: 6 Clubs (1 title each)
- Broadcasters: Footters, Fuchs Sport, ETB 1, TVG, TV3
- Sponsor: Versus e-Learning
- Website: rfef.es/primera-federacion
- Current: 2026–27 Primera Federación

The Primera Federación, officially the Primera Federación Versus e-Learning for sponsorship reasons (formerly known as Primera RFEF), is the third tier of the Spanish football league system beginning with the 2021–22 season. It is administered by the Royal Spanish Football Federation. It is below the top two professional leagues, the Primera División (also known as La Liga) and Segunda División (also known as La Liga Hypermotion), and above the Segunda Federación and Tercera Federación. It is the highest level of semi-professional football in Spain.

== History ==
In 2020, the Royal Spanish Football Federation announced the creation of three new divisions, two semi-professional and one amateur: the Primera División RFEF as the new third tier of the Spanish system; the Segunda División RFEF as the new fourth tier, broadly using the same format as the Segunda División B created in 1977; and the Tercera División RFEF as the fifth tier, along the same lines as the Tercera División from 1977 whereby groups are limited to teams from each of the nation's autonomous communities and is administered by a local body.

On 30 June 2022, after just one season of existence, Primera División RFEF was renamed to Primera Federación.

== League format ==
As of 2024–25 season, the Primera Federación is made up of 40 clubs divided into two groups of 20 teams distributed by geographical proximity, initially with a north-west/south-east split. The competition is divided in two phases, the first of which corresponds to the regular phase and the second to the two-legged First Federation play-off.

The regular phase is made up of a total of 38 matchdays in which the participating clubs play each other over two legs. The clubs that qualify in first place in each of the two groups will be promoted directly to the Segunda División. The clubs that qualify in the second to fifth places in each of the two groups will participate in the First Federation play-off through the direct elimination system. The two winning clubs in each of the finals will be promoted, along with the top finishers in each group, to the Segunda División. On the other hand, the teams that occupy the sixteenth to twentieth places in each of the groups will be relegated to the Segunda Federación.

=== Champion ===
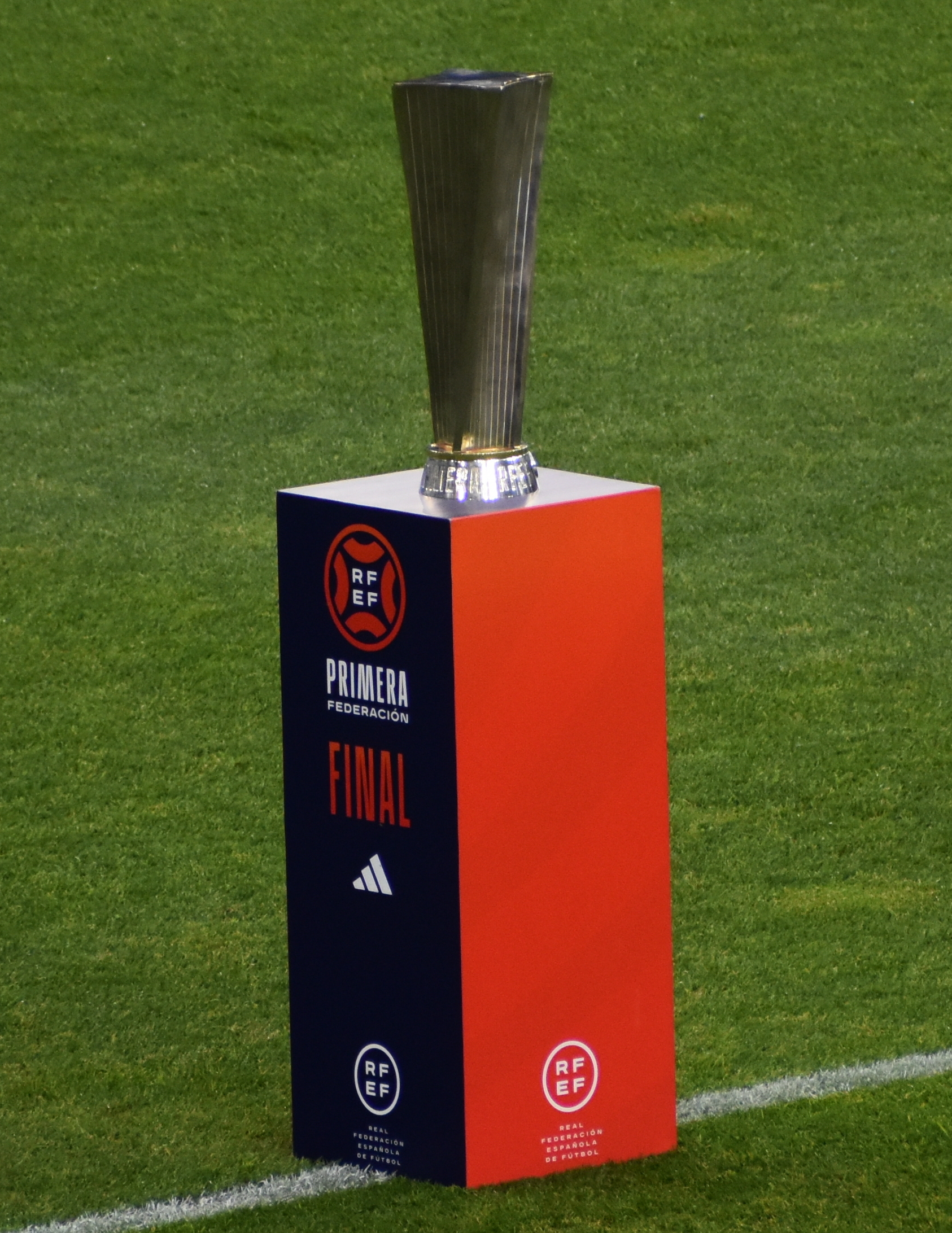
The division's championship trophy, on display before the first leg of the 2024 final

The two group winners play the final of the tournament. The winner obtains direct qualification to the Copa del Rey second round, as well as receiving the Primera Federación champion trophy.

=== Reserve teams eligibility ===
Reserve teams can participate in the Primera Federación if their first teams compete in a higher division, but cannot compete in the same division. If a team is relegated or promoted to the same division, the reserve team will be denied promotion or automatically relegated to ensure they remain one division separate.

== Clubs ==
Location of teams in 2026–27 Primera Federación
Red: Group 1; Cyan: Group 2

The member clubs of the Primera Federación for the 2026–27 season are listed below.

Group 1	Group 2
Arenas; Avilés Industrial; Barakaldo; Bilbao Athletic; Cacereño; Coria; Cultural Leonesa; Deportivo Fabril; Extremadura; UD Logroñés; Lugo; Mérida; Mirandés; UD Ourense; Ponferradina; Pontevedra; Racing Ferrol; Real Unión; Unionistas; Zamora	Águilas; Alcorcón; Algeciras; Antequera; Atlético Madrileño; Cartagena; Europa; Gimnàstic; Hércules; Huesca; Ibiza; Jaén; Juventud Torremolinos; Murcia; Rayo Majadahonda; Real Madrid Castilla; Sant Andreu; Teruel; Villarreal B; Zaragoza

== Seasons ==
Season	Group 1 winner	Group 2 winner	Other promoted teams
2021–22	**Racing Santander**	Andorra	Albacete and Villarreal B
2022–23	Racing Ferrol	**Amorebieta**	Alcorcón and Eldense
2023–24	**Deportivo La Coruña**	Castellón	Málaga and Córdoba
2024–25	Cultural Leonesa	**Ceuta**	Real Sociedad B and Andorra
2025–26	Tenerife	Eldense	Celta Fortuna and Sabadell

Bold: overall champion

== Champions and promotions ==
Club	Group winners	Overall champions	Promotions	Winning years (group)
FC Andorra	1	0	2	2021–22 (2)
Eldense	1	0	2	2025–26 (2)
Racing Santander	1	1	1	**2021–22 (1)**
Amorebieta	1	1	1	**2022–23 (2)**
Deportivo La Coruña	1	1	1	**2023–24 (1)**
Ceuta	1	1	1	**2024–25 (2)**
Racing Ferrol	1	0	1	2022–23 (1)
Castellón	1	0	1	2023–24 (2)
Cultural Leonesa	1	0	1	2024–25 (1)
Tenerife	1	0	1	2025–26 (1)
Albacete	0	0	1	-
Alcorcón	0	0	1	-
Málaga	0	0	1	-
Villarreal B	0	0	1	-
Córdoba	0	0	1	-
Real Sociedad B	0	0	1	-
Sabadell	0	0	1	-
Celta Fortuna	0	0	1	-

Bold: overall titles

== Top scorers ==
Goals in playoffs are not counted.

Season	Top scorer	Club	
2021–22	(Spain) Ferran Jutglà	Barcelona B	19
2022–23	(Spain) Rodri	AD Ceuta	20
2023–24	(Spain) Pau Víctor	Barcelona Atlètic	18
2024–25	(Spain) Gonzalo García	Real Madrid Castilla	25
2025–26	(Spain) Arnau Ortiz	Atlético Madrileño	22
