= David Navarro (football manager) =

Spanish football manager (born 1974)

Personal information
- Full name: David Navarro Arenaz
- Date of birth: 8 June 1974 (age 52)
- Place of birth: Zaragoza, Spain

Team information
- Current team: Zaragoza (head of methodology)

Managerial career
- Years: Team
- 1995–1996: Sala 10 (futsal)
- 1996–1997: Talavera (futsal; assistant)
- 1997–1998: Sego Zaragoza (futsal)
- 1998: Oliver (youth)
- 1998–2002: Stadium Casablanca (youth)
- 2002–2005: Utebo
- 2005–2007: Barbastro
- 2009: Ejea
- 2012–2014: Almudévar
- 2014: Huesca
- 2014–2015: Sariñena
- 2015–2022: Tarazona
- 2024: Zaragoza (assistant)
- 2024: Zaragoza (interim)
- 2026: Zaragoza

David Navarro Arenaz (born 8 June 1974) is a Spanish football manager, who is the current head of methodology of Real Zaragoza.

== Career ==
Born in Zaragoza, Aragon, Navarro began his career in futsal, as the manager of local sides AD Sala 10 and AD Super Sego FS. He later switched to football, taking over the youth sides of CD Oliver and Stadium Casablanca, before being named as manager of Tercera División side Utebo FC in February 2002.

Navarro left Utebo and moved to fellow fourth division side UD Barbastro in 2005, achieving promotion to Segunda División B in his first season, but suffering relegation in his second. On 21 January 2009, after more than a year without a club, he replaced Juan Carlos Beltrán at the helm of SD Ejea.

On 24 November 2009, Navarro joined SD Huesca to work as a technical secretary. In 2012, he was appointed manager of farm team AD Almudévar, before taking over the first team in the third tier on 18 March 2014.

In 2014, Navarro was named CD Sariñena manager, also in the fourth division. On 26 June 2015, after missing out promotion in the play-offs, he was named at the helm of fellow league team SD Tarazona.

Navarro worked at Tarazona for seven years, achieving promotion to the third level in 2020 and avoiding relegation in the following year. On 7 July 2021, he renewed his contract for a further campaign, before announcing his departure on 25 May 2022, after again leading the club to safety.

On 11 March 2024, after another year of inactivity, Navarro joined Víctor Fernández's staff at Real Zaragoza, as his assistant. On 19 December, he was named caretaker manager of the club, after Fernández resigned.

Navarro's first professional match occurred on 21 December 2024, a 1–0 Segunda División home win over Racing de Ferrol; he was also sent off after an altercation with opposite manager Cristóbal Parralo. A few days later, he left the club.

On 2 March 2026, Navarro returned to Zaragoza after being named interim manager, replacing sacked Rubén Sellés. On 10 March, he was confirmed as manager of the side for the remainder of the season. Unable to prevent the club's first-ever relegation, he returned to his previous role in the backroom staff on 1 June.

== Managerial statistics ==
As of 31 May 2026

Managerial record by team and tenure
Team	Nat	From	To	Record								Ref
Team	Nat	From	To	G	W	D	L	GF	GA	GD	Win %	Ref
Utebo	(Spain)	12 February 2002	28 June 2005	145	76	33	36	238	150	+88	52.41	
Barbastro	(Spain)	10 November 2005	30 May 2007	73	26	18	29	77	87	−10	35.62	
Ejea	(Spain)	21 January 2009	30 June 2009	18	10	3	5	38	19	+19	55.56	
Almudévar	(Spain)	1 July 2012	18 March 2014	68	28	16	24	110	76	+34	41.18	
Huesca	(Spain)	18 March 2014	29 June 2014	8	5	2	1	13	8	+5	62.50	
Sariñena	(Spain)	30 June 2014	26 June 2015	42	24	11	7	78	32	+46	57.14	
Tarazona	(Spain)	26 June 2015	25 May 2022	267	133	64	70	441	259	+182	49.81	
Zaragoza (interim)	(Spain)	19 December 2024	27 December 2024	1	1	0	0	1	0	+1	100.00	
Zaragoza	(Spain)	2 March 2026	1 June 2026	14	3	3	8	12	18	−6	21.43	
Total				636	306	150	180	1,008	649	+359	48.11	—
