= 2025–26 Segunda División =

95th season of the second-tier football league in Spain

La Liga 2
- Season: 2025–26
- Dates: Regular season: 15 August 2025 – 31 May 2026; Play-offs: 6–20 June 2026
- Champions: Racing Santander
- Promoted: Racing Santander; Deportivo La Coruña; Málaga
- Relegated: Mirandés; Huesca; Cultural Leonesa; Zaragoza
- Matches: 462
- Goals: 1,216 (2.63 per match)
- Top goalscorer: Sergio Arribas (24 goals)
- Biggest home win: Burgos 5–1 Cultural Leonesa (15 August 2025); Deportivo La Coruña 4–0 Huesca (19 September 2025); Racing Santander 4–0 Eibar (30 November 2025); Las Palmas 4–0 Cultural Leonesa (20 December 2025); Granada 5–1 Valladolid (14 February 2026); Burgos 4–0 Córdoba (22 March 2026)
- Biggest away win: Zaragoza 0–5 Cultural Leonesa (18 October 2025)
- Highest scoring: Castellón 5–4 Real Sociedad B (15 November 2025)
- Longest winning run: Málaga (6 matches)
- Longest unbeaten run: Almería; Málaga (9 matches)
- Longest winless run: Cultural Leonesa (16 matches)
- Longest losing run: Córdoba; Zaragoza (6 matches)

The 2025–26 La Liga 2, also known as LALIGA HYPERMOTION for sponsorship reasons, was the 95th season of the Segunda División since its establishment in Spain. It began on 15 August 2025 and ended its regular season on 31 May 2026, with the promotion play-offs ending on 20 June 2026.

== Teams ==
=== Team changes ===
Promoted from 2024–25 Primera Federación	Relegated from 2024–25 La Liga	Promoted to 2025–26 La Liga	Relegated to 2025–26 Primera Federación
Andorra; Ceuta; Cultural Leonesa; Real Sociedad B	Leganés; Las Palmas; Valladolid	Levante; Elche; Real Oviedo	Eldense; Cartagena; Racing Ferrol; Tenerife

=== Promotion and relegation (pre-season) ===
A total of 22 teams will contest the league, including 15 sides from the 2024–25 season, three relegated from the 2024–25 La Liga, and four promoted from the 2024–25 Primera Federación.

Teams promoted to La Liga

On 25 May 2025, Levante became the first side to mathematically be promoted, assured of a return to the top flight after a three-year absence following a 3–2 victory against Burgos. Elche became the second team to be promoted on the last day after defeating Deportivo La Coruña 4–0, returning after a two-year absence. The final team promoted was Real Oviedo, who secured their spot via the play-offs, marking a return to the top flight after a 24-year absence.

Teams relegated from La Liga

The first team to be relegated from La Liga were Valladolid, after a 5–1 loss to Real Betis on 25 April 2025, after only single season stay in the top tier. The second team to be relegated Las Palmas, after a 0–1 loss to Sevilla on 14 May 2025, after two seasons in the top tier. The third and final team relegated to Segunda was Leganés, after Espanyol managed to survive by beating Valladolid in the last matchday, after just one season in the top tier.

Teams relegated to Primera Federación

The first team to be relegated to the third level was Cartagena, after a 2–1 loss to Almería on 14 April 2025, ending a five-year stay in the second division. The second team to be relegated was Racing Ferrol, who were relegated on 29 April 2025 after a loss to Almería, ending their two seasons in the second division. The third team to be relegated was Tenerife, who were relegated on 10 May 2025, following Real Zaragoza's win against Cartagena, ending a 12-year stay in second division. The fourth and final team to be relegated was Eldense, who were relegated on 25 May 2025, following a 3–3 draw against Racing Santander, ending a 2-year stay in the second division.

Teams promoted from Primera Federación

On 11 May 2025, Ceuta became the first team to achieve promotion to Segunda División, following a 2–1 win against Fuenlabrada, returning for the first time in 57 years, it will also be the first time the city of Ceuta will have a representative in the category in 45 years. The second team to earn promotion was Cultural Leonesa following a 1–1 draw against Andorra in the last matchday on 24 May 2025, after a 7-year absence. The third team to secure promotion was Andorra, who returned after a one-season absence on 21 June after beating Ponferradina 2–1 on aggregate in the first promotion playoff. The fourth and final team was Real Sociedad B, who defeated Gimnàstic 4–3 on aggregate in the second promotion playoff, securing their return to the division after three years. Reserve teams return to second tier after one-year absence.

=== Stadiums and locations ===
Location of teams in 2025–26 Segunda División
Location of teams in 2025–26 Segunda División (Canary Islands)

Team	Location	Stadium	Capacity
Albacete	Albacete	Estadio Carlos Belmonte	17,524
Almería	Almería	UD Almería Stadium	15,000
Andorra (Note: Andorra is an Andorran club playing in the Spanish football league system.)	Encamp	Nou Estadi Encamp	5,108
Burgos	Burgos	Estadio El Plantío	12,194
Cádiz	Cádiz	JP Financial Estadio	20,724
Castellón	Castellón de la Plana	Estadio SkyFi Castàlia	15,500
Ceuta	Ceuta	Estadio Alfonso Murube	6,500
Córdoba	Córdoba	Estadio Bahrain Victorious Nuevo Arcángel de Córdoba	20,989
Cultural Leonesa	León	Estadio Reino de León	13,346
Deportivo La Coruña	A Coruña	Estadio ABANCA-RIAZOR	32,660
Eibar	Eibar	Estadio Municipal de Ipurua	8,164
Granada	Granada	Estadio Nuevo Los Cármenes	19,189
Huesca	Huesca	Estadio El Alcoraz	9,100
Las Palmas	Las Palmas	Estadio Gran Canaria	32,392
Leganés	Leganés	Estadio Ontime Butarque	12,450
Málaga	Málaga	La Rosaleda Stadium	30,044
Mirandés	Miranda de Ebro	Estadio Municipal de Anduva	5,759
Mirandés	Vitoria-Gasteiz	Mendizorrotza Stadium (Note: Mirandés played at the Mendizorrotza Stadium until November due to remodeling and adaptation works at Anduva.)	19,840
Racing Santander	Santander	Stadium El Sardinero	22,222
Real Sociedad B	San Sebastián	Estadio Zubieta	4,000
Real Sociedad B	San Sebastián	Reale Arena (Note: Due to the construction work on the new stadium at the Zubieta Facilities, Real Sociedad B played some matches of the competition at the Reale Arena.)	39,500
Sporting Gijón	Gijón	Estadio El Molinón-Enrique Castro "Quini"	29,371
Valladolid	Valladolid	Estadio Municipal José Zorrilla	27,618
Zaragoza	Zaragoza	Ibercaja Stadium	20,000

=== Personnel and sponsors ===
Team	Manager	Captain	Kit maker	Kit sponsors	
Team	Manager	Captain	Kit maker	Main	Other(s)
Albacete	(Spain) Alberto González	(Spain) Higinio Marín	Adidas	Globalcaja	List: Side: None; Back: Rodacal Beyem, Iner Energía; Sleeves: MGS Seguros; Shorts: None
Almería	(Spain) Rubi	(Spain) Fernando Martínez	Macron	Kudu	List: Side: None; Back: None; Sleeves: دومينوز بيتزا Domino's; Shorts: None
Andorra	(Spain) Carles Manso	(Argentina) Nico Ratti	Nike	Mora Banc	List: Side: None; Back: Andorra; Sleeves: None; Shorts: Andorra
Burgos	(Spain) Luis Miguel Ramis	(Spain) Miguel Atienza	Macron	Digi	List: Side: None; Back: Fundación Caja Rural Burgos; Sleeves: Beroil; Shorts: Ayuntamiento de Burgos, VTBatteries Exide
Cádiz	(Spain) Imanol Idiakez	(Spain) Álex Fernández	Macron	Digi	List: Side: None; Back: Hospitales Pascual; Sleeves: Ayuda T Pymes; Shorts: None
Castellón	(Spain) Pablo Hernández	(Spain) Salva Ruiz	Errea	LayerZero	List: Side: Repcar Still; Back: Globeenergy; Sleeves: MGS Seguros; Shorts: CCD
Ceuta	(Spain) José Juan Romero	(Spain) Albert Caparrós	Macron	Ceuta	List: Side: Punta Almina Promociones y Costrucciones; Back: None; Sleeves: Baleària; Shorts: Hélity Copter Airlines
Córdoba	(Spain) Iván Ania	(Spain) Carlos Marín	Joma	Bahrain Victorious	List: Side: Córdoba; Back: Globalzia, Silbon; Sleeves: Province of Córdoba; Shorts: iFertility
Cultural Leonesa	(Spain) Rubén de la Barrera	(Spain) Rodri	Macron	Aspire Academy	List: Side: MGS Seguros; Back: Hyundai Lemauto; Sleeves: Cerlesa; Shorts: None
Deportivo La Coruña	(Spain) Antonio Hidalgo	(Spain) Diego Villares	Kappa	Estrella Galicia 0,0	List: Side: None; Back: Abanca; Sleeves: Digi; Shorts: MGS Seguros, Bualá
Eibar	(Spain) Beñat San José	(Spain) Anaitz Arbilla	Hummel	Smartlog Group	List: Side: None; Back: Software logístico Galys; Sleeves: None; Shorts: None
Granada	(Spain) Pacheta	(Spain) Sergio Ruiz	Adidas	Cámara Granada	List: Side: None; Back: Lowi; Sleeves: Caja Rural Granada; Shorts: Grupo Eigra
Huesca	(Spain) José Luis Oltra	(Spain) Jorge Pulido	Soka	Aramón	List: Side: Tu Provincia Huesca La Magia; Back: Bodega Sommos; Sleeves: Hinaco Constructora Inmobiliaria; Shorts: Cerveza Ámbar Triple Zero
Las Palmas	(Spain) Luis García	(Spain) Kirian Rodríguez	Hummel	Gran Canaria	List: Side: Cerveza PÍO PÍO; Back: Grupo DISA, Islas Canarias; Sleeves: Kalise; Shorts: Cordial Hotels, Binter Canarias, Televisión Canaria
Leganés	(Spain) Carlos Martínez	(Spain) Jorge Sáenz	Joma	OnTime	List: Side: SportyTV Africa; Back: Nara Seguros, Lowi; Sleeves: Mercanza; Shorts: Baghdadi Capital, Ebury
Málaga	(Spain) Juan Francisco Funes	(Spain) Ramón Enríquez	Hummel	Málaga	List: Side: Universidad Alfonso X El Sabio; Back: Grupo Dental Clinics, Benahavis; Sleeves: Sabor a Málaga; Shorts: MGS Seguros, Costa del Sol
Mirandés	(Spain) Antxon Muneta	(Spain) Sergio Postigo	Adidas	Miranda Empresas	List: Side: None; Back: Bodegas Izadi; Sleeves: None; Shorts: Alucoil
Racing Santander	(Spain) José Alberto Lopez	(Spain) Íñigo Sainz-Maza	Austral	Eni Plenitude	List: Side: Cantabria Telecom; Back: Banco Santander, Cantabria Labs; Sleeves: MGS Seguros; Shorts: Pinturas Ferroluz, Palets del Cantábrico
Real Sociedad B	(Spain) Ion Ansotegi	(Spain) Luken Beitia	Macron	Grupo Amenabar	List: Side: None; Back: Kutxabank; Sleeves: None; Shorts: Kutxabank
Sporting Gijón	(Spain) Borja Jiménez	(Spain) Rubén Yáñez	Puma	Siroko	List: Side: None; Back: Central Lechera Asturiana; Sleeves: Integra Energía; Shorts: Esfer, Cyasa Nissan
Valladolid	(Spain) Fran Escribá	(Croatia) Stanko Jurić	Kappa	Estrella Galicia 0,0	List: Side: Caja Rural Zamora; Back: None; Sleeves: Digi; Shorts: INEXO, Bodegas Santiso González, Miguel Vergara, Dulces el Toro, Grupo Ahorra
Zaragoza	(Spain) David Navarro	(Spain) Francho Serrano	Adidas	Caravan Fragancias	List: Side: Škoda Zaratecno; Back: Cerveza Ámbar Triple Zero, Kosner; Sleeves: MGS Seguros; Shorts: Embou, Aragón - Sabor de Verdad

=== Managerial changes ===
Team	Outgoing manager	Manner of departure	Date of vacancy	Position in table	Incoming manager	Date of appointment
Valladolid	(Spain) Álvaro Rubio	Sacked	4 June 2025	Pre-season	(Uruguay) Guillermo Almada	8 July 2025
Real Sociedad B	(Spain) Iosu Rivas	Appointed first team assistant	23 June 2025	Pre-season	(Spain) Ion Ansotegi	29 May 2025
Leganés	(Spain) Borja Jiménez	End of contract	30 June 2025	Pre-season	(Spain) Paco López	10 June 2025
Huesca	(Spain) Antonio Hidalgo	End of contract	30 June 2025	Pre-season	(Spain) Sergi Guilló	13 June 2025
Las Palmas	(Spain) Diego Martínez	End of contract	30 June 2025	Pre-season	(Spain) Luis García	7 June 2025
Deportivo La Coruña	(Spain) Óscar Gilsanz	End of contract	30 June 2025	Pre-season	(Spain) Antonio Hidalgo	10 June 2025
Mirandés	(Italy) Alessio Lisci	End of contract	30 June 2025	Pre-season	(Spain) Fran Justo	30 June 2025
Andorra	(Spain) Beto Company	End of contract	30 June 2025	Pre-season	(Spain) Ibai Gómez	25 June 2025
Castellón	(Netherlands) Johan Plat	Sacked	16 September 2025	20th	(Spain) Pablo Hernández (Note: Originally as caretaker manager, appointed on a permanent basis on 12 November 2025.)	16 September 2025
Cultural Leonesa	(Spain) Raúl Llona	Sacked	22 September 2025	20th	(Spain) Cuco Ziganda	23 September 2025
Sporting Gijón	(Spain) Asier Garitano	Sacked	5 October 2025	15th	(Spain) Borja Jiménez	8 October 2025
Zaragoza	(Spain) Gabi	Sacked	12 October 2025	22nd	(Spain) Emilio Larraz	12 October 2025
Zaragoza	(Spain) Emilio Larraz	Demoted to the B-team	20 October 2025	22nd	(Spain) Rubén Sellés	20 October 2025
Mirandés	(Spain) Fran Justo	Sacked	2 November 2025	21st	(Spain) Jesús Galván (Note: Antxon Muneta was the caretaker head coach in the 13th round against Sporting Gijón.)	7 November 2025
Huesca	(Spain) Sergi Guilló	Sacked	10 November 2025	18th	(Spain) Bolo	12 November 2025
Málaga	(Spain) Sergio Pellicer	Sacked	18 November 2025	18th	(Spain) Juan Francisco Funes	19 November 2025
Andorra	(Spain) Ibai Gómez	Sacked	23 November 2025	18th	(Spain) Carles Manso (Note: Originally as caretaker manager, appointed on a permanent basis on 21 December 2025.)	23 November 2025
Leganés	(Spain) Paco López	Sacked	4 December 2025	18th	(Spain) Igor Oca (Note: Originally as caretaker manager, appointed on a permanent basis on 24 December 2025.)	5 December 2025
Real Sociedad B	(Spain) Ion Ansotegi	Promoted to the first team (Note: As a caretaker)	14 December 2025	16th	(Spain) Jon Gorrotxategi (caretaker) (Note: Caretaker for the period of Ansotegi's caretaker spell in the first team)	18 December 2025
Valladolid	(Uruguay) Guillermo Almada	Sacked	15 December 2025	10th	(Spain) Sisi (caretaker)	15 December 2025
Real Sociedad B	(Spain) Jon Gorrotxategi	End of caretaker spell	20 December 2025	17th	(Spain) Ion Ansotegi	20 December 2025
Valladolid	(Spain) Sisi	End of caretaker spell	23 December 2025	12th	(Spain) Luis Tevenet	23 December 2025
Mirandés	(Spain) Jesús Galván	Sacked	12 January 2026	22nd	(Spain) Antxon Muneta	12 January 2026
Valladolid	(Spain) Luis Tevenet	Sacked	15 February 2026	19th	(Spain) Fran Escribá	16 February 2026
Cultural Leonesa	(Spain) Cuco Ziganda	Sacked	23 February 2026	20th	(Spain) Rubén de la Barrera	24 February 2026
Zaragoza	(Spain) Rubén Sellés	Sacked	2 March 2026	22nd	(Spain) David Navarro (Note: Originally as caretaker manager, appointed on a permanent basis on 10 March 2026.)	2 March 2026
Cádiz	(Spain) Gaizka Garitano	Sacked	9 March 2026	16th	(Spain) Sergio González	9 March 2026
Huesca	(Spain) Bolo	Sacked	16 March 2026	19th	(Spain) José Luis Oltra	16 March 2026
Cádiz	(Spain) Sergio González	Sacked	22 April 2026	18th	(Spain) Imanol Idiakez	22 April 2026
Leganés	(Spain) Igor Oca	Sacked	26 May 2026	18th	(Spain) Carlos Martínez	26 May 2026

== League table ==
Pos	Team	Pld	W	D	L	GF	GA	GD	Pts	Qualification or relegation
1	Racing Santander (C, P)	42	25	7	10	90	61	+29	82	Promotion to La Liga
2	Deportivo La Coruña (P)	42	22	11	9	65	44	+21	77	Promotion to La Liga
3	Almería	42	22	8	12	81	63	+18	74	Qualification for promotion play-offs
4	Málaga (O, P)	42	21	10	11	75	52	+23	73 (Note: Málaga finished ahead of Las Palmas on head-to-head points: Málaga 2–0 Las Palmas, Las Palmas 0–1 Málaga.)	Qualification for promotion play-offs
5	Las Palmas	42	20	13	9	57	40	+17	73	Qualification for promotion play-offs
6	Castellón	42	20	12	10	70	51	+19	72 (Note: Castellón finished ahead of Burgos on head-to-head points: Castellón 3–1 Burgos, Burgos 0–0 Castellón.)	Qualification for promotion play-offs
7	Burgos	42	20	12	10	48	33	+15	72	
8	Eibar	42	19	10	13	52	40	+12	67	
9	Córdoba	42	17	10	15	57	61	−4	61 (Note: Tied on head-to-head points. Head-to-head goal difference: Córdoba +1, Sporting Gijón 0, Ceuta –1.)	
10	Sporting Gijón	42	18	7	17	60	54	+6	61	
11	Ceuta	42	17	10	15	51	63	−12	61	
12	Albacete	42	16	11	15	56	55	+1	59	
13	Andorra	42	16	10	16	62	54	+8	58	
14	Granada	42	12	12	18	50	56	−6	48	
15	Real Sociedad B	42	12	11	19	52	61	−9	47	
16	Leganés	42	11	13	18	43	51	−8	46 (Note: Leganés finished ahead of Valladollid on head-to-head points: Leganés 3–0 Valladolid, Valladolid 3–2 Leganés.)	
17	Valladolid	42	12	10	20	44	57	−13	46	
18	Cádiz	42	11	10	21	41	61	−20	43	
19	Mirandés (R)	42	10	10	22	47	69	−22	40	Relegation to Primera Federación
20	Huesca (R)	42	9	11	22	41	63	−22	38	Relegation to Primera Federación
21	Cultural Leonesa (R)	42	9	10	23	39	68	−29	37	Relegation to Primera Federación
22	Zaragoza (R)	42	8	12	22	35	59	−24	36	Relegation to Primera Federación

Source: LaLiga Hypermotion
Rules for classification: 1) Points; 2) Head-to-head points; 3) Head-to-head goal difference; 4) Goal difference; 5) Goals scored; 6) Fair-play points
(Note: Head-to-head record is used only after all the matches between the teams in question have been played)
(C) Champions; (O) Play-off winners; (P) Promoted; (R) Relegated
Notes:

Notes

1. Reserve teams are not eligible for promotion to the same league as the first team.

== Results ==
Home \ Away	ALB	ALM	AND	BUR	CAD	CAS	CEU	COR	CUL	DEP	EIB	GRA	HUE	LPA	LEG	MAL	MIR	RAC	RSO	SPO	VAL	ZAR
Albacete	—	1–1	1–0	2–3	1–0	1–1	0–0	1–3	2–1	0–2	0–3	4–1	2–1	2–1	1–3	1–3	1–4	2–3	3–1	1–1	2–0	2–0
Almería	4–4	—	3–2	1–2	3–0	1–0	4–2	2–1	3–0	1–2	3–1	3–2	0–0	1–2	2–1	3–2	4–2	2–3	5–1	2–1	1–0	4–2
Andorra	0–1	1–2	—	2–1	0–0	1–3	0–2	3–1	1–1	1–0	0–1	0–0	1–1	5–1	1–2	3–3	1–1	6–2	1–2	1–0	1–0	2–1
Burgos	0–1	0–0	1–0	—	1–1	0–0	1–1	4–0	5–1	1–1	1–0	1–1	1–0	0–0	2–1	2–1	2–0	0–2	1–0	1–0	0–1	1–1
Cádiz	2–1	1–2	0–1	1–3	—	2–0	0–0	1–3	1–2	0–1	1–0	1–2	1–0	1–2	3–0	0–3	1–0	2–3	0–2	3–2	0–0	0–1
Castellón	0–1	2–0	2–0	3–1	1–1	—	3–3	1–2	1–1	2–0	2–1	3–2	4–1	1–0	2–0	2–1	3–1	1–3	5–4	3–1	0–1	1–1
Ceuta	1–0	3–2	2–1	1–0	2–1	1–1	—	3–2	3–1	1–2	1–0	2–1	2–1	1–1	1–2	1–4	2–0	0–0	0–0	0–1	0–3	1–0
Córdoba	1–2	1–1	1–4	2–0	1–2	2–1	2–0	—	1–0	1–3	0–0	1–0	1–1	1–3	2–1	0–1	2–2	2–2	0–2	3–2	3–1	1–0
Cultural Leonesa	0–0	0–1	0–4	0–2	2–2	1–3	0–1	1–2	—	0–1	2–1	0–1	0–2	0–3	0–0	1–0	3–2	1–2	1–1	2–4	1–0	0–0
Deportivo	2–1	1–1	2–1	0–0	2–2	1–3	2–1	2–0	3–0	—	1–0	0–2	4–0	1–2	2–1	1–1	3–1	0–1	0–3	1–0	1–1	2–1
Eibar	3–2	1–0	2–0	0–0	3–1	0–0	3–0	2–0	1–2	1–1	—	3–0	2–1	3–1	0–0	2–4	2–1	2–1	2–1	1–0	3–0	1–2
Granada	1–1	2–4	1–1	0–1	0–0	0–0	1–1	1–1	1–0	1–3	0–0	—	4–2	0–0	0–2	0–1	1–2	1–0	5–2	1–2	5–1	3–1
Huesca	0–0	1–3	2–2	2–1	1–0	0–1	2–0	1–2	1–1	1–1	2–1	0–1	—	1–1	1–1	1–0	1–2	1–1	1–2	2–0	1–4	1–0
Las Palmas	2–1	0–1	1–1	0–0	1–0	1–1	4–0	1–2	4–0	1–1	3–1	2–0	2–1	—	2–0	0–1	0–0	3–1	2–1	1–0	2–1	1–1
Leganés	2–1	0–3	0–4	1–2	1–1	0–1	5–2	0–0	1–1	2–2	0–1	1–0	0–0	0–1	—	2–0	1–0	1–2	2–0	0–1	3–0	1–1
Málaga	1–0	2–1	4–1	3–0	0–1	2–3	2–1	2–2	2–1	3–0	1–1	2–2	5–3	2–0	0–0	—	3–2	1–1	1–0	2–1	3–3	1–1
Mirandés	1–1	2–2	1–2	0–2	0–2	2–2	0–1	1–2	2–1	1–5	0–1	3–1	0–1	1–1	0–0	2–1	—	1–3	1–0	2–1	2–1	0–1
Racing Santander	0–4	5–1	1–2	1–0	4–1	3–1	4–1	4–3	2–4	2–1	4–0	2–2	4–2	4–1	1–1	3–0	1–0	—	1–0	3–1	4–1	2–3
Real Sociedad B	0–0	2–2	3–0	0–0	3–3	4–2	1–3	1–1	1–1	2–3	0–1	0–2	2–0	1–1	2–1	2–1	2–2	1–3	—	0–1	1–0	1–0
Sporting Gijón	3–4	3–1	1–1	2–3	3–0	4–1	1–2	2–1	1–0	1–1	1–1	1–0	2–1	0–0	0–0	1–3	3–0	2–1	1–0	—	2–2	1–0
Valladolid	0–1	3–1	0–1	0–1	3–0	0–4	3–0	0–0	0–1	0–2	0–0	2–1	1–0	0–1	3–2	1–1	1–1	1–1	1–0	2–3	—	2–0
Zaragoza	0–0	2–0	1–3	0–1	1–2	0–0	2–2	0–1	0–5	0–2	1–1	0–1	1–0	1–2	3–2	0–2	1–2	2–0	1–1	1–3	1–1	—

Source: LaLiga
Legend: Blue = home team win; Yellow = draw; Red = away team win.

=== Positions by round ===
The table lists the positions of teams after each week of matches. In order to preserve chronological evolvements, any postponed matches are not included to the round at which they were originally scheduled, but added to the full round they were played immediately afterwards.

Team ╲ Round	1	2	3	4	5	6	7	8	9	10	11	12	13	14	15	16	17	18	19	20	21	22	23	24	25	26	27	28	29	30	31	32	33	34	35	36	37	38	39	40	41	42
Racing	4	2	1	1	1	3	4	2	3	1	1	1	1	2	2	2	1	1	1	1	1	1	1	1	1	2	1	1	1	1	1	1	1	1	1	1	1	1	1	1	1	1
Deportivo	3	8	8	4	2	1	1	1	2	4	8	4	2	1	1	1	2	2	3	5	5	4	5	3	3	4	4	4	4	2	2	3	2	3	2	2	3	3	2	2	2	2
Almería	9	9	9	13	15	12	9	9	6	5	3	2	5	5	4	3	3	3	4	3	3	5	6	4	4	3	3	3	2	3	3	2	3	2	3	3	2	2	3	3	3	3
Málaga	15	12	7	6	10	11	13	19	16	18	13	16	17	18	15	13	14	11	10	9	7	6	3	6	5	6	5	5	6	4	4	4	4	6	4	5	8	6	4	4	4	4
Las Palmas	13	7	12	12	9	6	8	5	5	2	2	5	3	3	3	4	4	5	2	2	2	3	4	5	6	5	6	6	5	6	5	7	5	4	7	7	5	4	5	5	5	5
Castellón	19	18	17	19	20	16	12	11	11	16	17	14	12	10	6	6	5	4	5	4	4	2	2	2	2	1	2	2	3	5	6	6	6	5	6	4	4	5	6	6	6	6
Burgos	1	4	10	11	8	9	5	7	9	6	5	3	4	4	5	5	6	6	8	10	8	7	9	8	7	8	10	8	7	7	7	5	7	7	5	6	6	7	8	7	7	7
Eibar	11	5	11	7	11	7	6	10	10	15	15	18	13	14	18	20	20	20	18	13	16	16	16	13	14	10	11	11	10	10	8	8	8	8	8	8	7	8	7	8	8	8
Córdoba	16	17	18	16	16	19	21	16	13	13	10	8	8	8	7	10	12	12	11	11	9	10	8	7	9	7	7	10	11	11	12	14	14	12	12	11	10	9	9	9	9	9
Sporting	5	3	2	2	7	10	11	15	12	9	6	9	9	9	12	11	9	7	7	8	11	9	7	9	8	9	8	9	9	8	9	10	10	9	10	10	11	12	13	12	13	10
Ceuta	21	20	22	17	18	15	15	12	14	10	7	10	10	13	9	8	7	9	9	6	10	11	10	10	10	12	9	7	8	9	10	9	9	10	11	12	12	11	11	13	11	11
Albacete	8	15	16	20	21	18	14	14	17	12	16	11	14	11	13	15	13	14	14	17	17	14	12	12	12	13	14	13	14	14	11	11	11	13	14	13	13	13	12	11	10	12
Andorra	10	6	4	8	5	5	3	4	7	8	12	12	11	16	19	19	19	17	13	14	14	13	14	16	16	18	17	12	12	13	15	13	12	11	9	9	9	10	10	10	12	13
Granada	20	22	20	21	22	22	22	18	20	19	19	20	19	19	20	14	15	19	19	20	20	19	17	15	15	14	16	17	15	16	14	12	13	14	13	14	14	14	14	14	14	14
R. Sociedad B	7	13	13	14	14	17	19	22	18	20	20	19	16	17	14	17	18	16	17	19	18	18	19	19	17	16	13	16	13	12	13	15	15	15	16	16	17	17	16	15	15	15
Leganés	14	14	14	15	12	13	16	13	15	11	11	13	15	12	16	18	16	18	20	16	12	15	13	14	13	15	15	15	17	18	17	16	16	16	15	15	16	16	17	17	18	16
Valladolid	2	1	3	3	3	4	7	8	4	7	9	7	7	7	10	9	8	10	12	12	13	12	15	17	18	19	19	18	18	17	18	18	17	17	17	17	15	15	15	16	16	17
Cádiz	6	10	5	5	4	2	2	3	1	3	4	6	6	6	8	7	10	8	6	7	6	8	11	11	11	11	12	14	16	15	16	17	18	18	18	18	18	18	18	18	17	18
Mirandés	17	16	15	10	13	14	17	17	19	21	21	21	21	21	21	21	21	21	22	22	22	22	22	22	22	22	21	21	22	22	22	21	21	21	21	21	20	19	19	20	19	19
Huesca	12	11	6	9	6	8	10	6	8	14	14	17	18	20	17	16	17	15	15	18	19	20	20	18	19	17	18	19	19	19	19	20	20	20	20	20	19	20	20	19	20	20
Cultural	22	21	21	22	17	20	18	20	21	17	18	15	20	15	11	12	11	13	16	15	15	17	18	20	20	20	20	20	20	21	21	22	22	22	22	22	22	22	22	21	21	21
Zaragoza	18	19	19	18	19	21	20	21	22	22	22	22	22	22	22	22	22	22	21	21	21	21	21	21	21	21	22	22	21	20	20	19	19	19	19	19	21	21	21	22	22	22

Promotion to La Liga
Qualification to promotion play-offs
Relegation to Primera Federación

Source: BDFútbol

== Promotion play-offs ==
Semi-finals
3	Almería	1	3	4
6	Castellón	1	2	3
4	Málaga	1	1	2
5	Las Palmas	0	1	1

Final
3	Almería	0	1	1
4	Málaga	0	2	2

=== Semi-finals ===
Team 1	Agg.	Team 2	1st leg	2nd leg
Almería	4−3	Castellón	1−1	3−2
Málaga	2–1	Las Palmas	1–0	1–1

First leg

6 June 2026	Castellón	1−1	Almería	Castellón de la Plana
21:00 UTC+2	Brignani 44'	Report	Arribas 66'	Stadium: Estadio SkyFi Castalia; Attendance: 13,991; Referee: Luis Bestard Servera

7 June 2026	Las Palmas	0–1	Málaga	Las Palmas
21:00 UTC+2		Report	Larrubia 57'	Stadium: Estadio Gran Canaria; Attendance: 27,128; Referee: Andrés Fuentes Molina

Second leg

9 June 2026	Almería	3−2 (4−3 agg.)	Castellón	Almería
21:00 UTC+2	Embarba 41'; Muñoz 80'; Džodić 90+4'	Report	Calatrava 57'; Sienra 69'	Stadium: UD Almería Stadium; Attendance: 17,007; Referee: Jon Ander González Esteban

10 June 2026	Málaga	1–1 (2–1 agg.)	Las Palmas	Málaga
21:00 UTC+2	Muñoz 69'	Report	Jesé 3'	Stadium: Estadio La Rosaleda; Attendance: 29,935; Referee: Rafael Sánchez López

=== Final ===
Team 1	Agg.	Team 2	1st leg	2nd leg
Almería	1–2	Málaga	0–0	1–2

First leg

14 June 2026	Málaga	0–0	Almería	Málaga
21:00 UTC+2		Report		Stadium: Estadio la Rosaleda; Attendance: 30,083; Referee: Salvador Lax Franco

Second leg

20 June 2026	Almería	1–2 (1–2 agg.)	Málaga	Almería
21:00 UTC+2	Baptistão 76'	Report	Chupete 65'; Larrubia 71'	Stadium: UD Almería Stadium; Attendance: 17,825; Referee: Carlos Muñiz Muñoz

== Season statistics ==
=== Scoring ===
- First goal of the season:
  (Spain) Curro Sánchez for Burgos against Cultural Leonesa (15 August 2025)
- Last goal of the season:
  (Spain) Jordi Escobar for Huesca against Córdoba (31 May 2026)

=== Top goalscorers ===
Rank	Player	Club	Goals
1	(Spain) Sergio Arribas	Almería	25
2	(Spain) Chupe	Málaga	24
3	(Spain) Andrés Martín	Racing Santander	23
4	(Belgium) Jonathan Dubasin	Sporting Gijón	16
4	(Spain) Adri Embarba	Almería	16
4	(Spain) Carlos Fernández	Mirandés	16
4	(Spain) Asier Villalibre	Racing Santander	16
8	(Spain) Álex Calatrava	Castellón	15
8	(Spain) Gorka Carrera	Real Sociedad B	15
8	(Colombia) Juan Otero	Sporting Gijón	15

=== Hat-tricks ===
Player	For	Against	Result	Date	Round	Ref.
(Netherlands) Zakaria Eddahchouri	Deportivo La Coruña	Mirandés	5–1 (A)	13 September 2025	5	
(Bosnia and Herzegovina) Kenan Kodro	Zaragoza	Racing Santander	3–2 (A)	10 January 2026	21	
(Spain) Jon Bautista	Eibar	Albacete	3–0 (A)	24 April 2026	37	
(Spain) Álex Calatrava	Castellón	Málaga	3–2 (A)	25 April 2026	37	
(Spain) Sergio Arribas	Almería	Granada	4–2 (A)	26 April 2026	37	

Note

(H) – Home; (A) – Away

=== Zamora Trophy ===
The Zamora Trophy is awarded by newspaper Marca to the goalkeeper with the lowest goals-to-games ratio. A goalkeeper has to have played at least 28 games of 60 or more minutes to be eligible for the trophy.

Rank	Player	Club	Goals against	Matches	Average
1	(Spain) Ander Cantero	Burgos	33	42	0.79
2	(Spain) Jonmi	Eibar	40	42	0.95
3	(Croatia) Dinko Horkaš	Las Palmas	39	40	0.98
4	(Belgium) Romain Matthys	Castellón	44	38	1.16
5	(Spain) Juan Soriano	Leganés	51	42	1.21

== Awards ==
=== Monthly ===
Month	Player of the Month		Reference
Month	Player	Club	Reference
August	(Spain) Asier Villalibre	Racing Santander	
September	(Netherlands) Zakaria Eddahchouri	Deportivo La Coruña	
October	(Ecuador) Jeremy Arévalo	Racing Santander	
November	(Spain) Yeremay Hernández	Deportivo La Coruña	
December	(Spain) César Gelabert	Sporting Gijón	
January	(Spain) Chupete	Málaga	
February	(Democratic Republic of the Congo) Brian Cipenga	Castellón	
March	(Spain) Chupete	Málaga	
April	(Spain) Josep Cerdà	Andorra	

== Attendances ==
Segunda División clubs listed by average home league attendance in the 2025–26 season:

Pos	Club	Average attendance
1	Málaga CF	25,361
2	Deportivo de La Coruña	24,247
3	Real Racing Club	21,090
4	Real Sporting	20,146
5	UD Las Palmas	18,524
6	Real Valladolid	16,472
7	Córdoba CF	15,191
8	Real Zaragoza	14,675
9	Cádiz CF	13,797
10	UD Almería	13,352
11	Granada CF	12,780
12	CD Castellón	11,930
13	Albacete Balompié	10,523
14	CD Leganés	10,085
15	Cultural Leonesa	9,816
16	Burgos CF	9,676
17	SD Huesca	6,056
18	SD Eibar	4,949
19	AD Ceuta	4,712
20	CD Mirandés	3,168
21	Real Sociedad B	2,828
22	FC Andorra	2,561

== See also ==
- 2025–26 La Liga
- 2025–26 Primera Federación
- 2025–26 Segunda Federación
- 2025–26 Tercera Federación
