= 2019–20 Segunda División =

89th season of the second-tier football league in Spain

Segunda División
- Season: 2019–20
- Dates: 17 August 2019 – 7 August 2020 (regular season)
- Champions: Huesca
- Promoted: Huesca; Cádiz; Elche
- Relegated: Deportivo de La Coruña; Numancia; Extremadura; Racing Santander
- Matches: 462
- Goals: 1,057 (2.29 per match)
- Top goalscorer: Cristhian Stuani (29 goals)
- Best goalkeeper: Munir (0.78 goals/match)
- Biggest home win: Ponferradina 4–0 Tenerife (1 September 2019); Racing Santander 4–0 Mirandés (17 September 2019); Sporting Gijón 4–0 Zaragoza (27 October 2019); Almería 4–0 Deportivo de La Coruña (7 March 2020); Sporting Gijón 4–0 Las Palmas (8 March 2020); Las Palmas 5–1 Extremadura (20 July 2020)
- Biggest away win: Albacete 0–4 Tenerife (15 September 2019); Lugo 0–4 Almería (4 January 2020)
- Highest scoring: Fuenlabrada 3–4 Alcorcón (1 March 2020)
- Longest winning run: Deportivo de La Coruña (7 matches)
- Longest unbeaten run: Almería (11 matches)
- Longest winless run: Deportivo de La Coruña (19 matches)
- Longest losing run: Numancia (7 matches)
- Highest attendance: 28,098; Zaragoza 3–1 Deportivo (23 February 2020)
- Lowest attendance: 1,770; Alcorcón 1–1 Numancia (15 January 2020)
- Attendance: 1,072,520 (2,321 per match)

The 2019–20 Segunda División season, also known as LaLiga SmartBank for sponsorship reasons, was the 89th since its establishment.

On 12 March 2020 after most of teams had played 31 games, the league was suspended for at least two weeks due to the COVID-19 pandemic in Spain. The league was suspended indefinitely on 23 March. The season recommenced on 10 June and was initially planned to be completed on 20 July.

On 20 July 2020, the final day of the regular season, Deportivo de La Coruña's match against Fuenlabrada was suspended indefinitely due to several Fuenlabrada players testing positive for COVID-19, therefore, delaying the official end of the season, whilst relegating Deportivo without even playing their match. The match was finally played on 7 August, resulting in a 2–1 win for Deportivo.

== Teams ==
=== Promotion and relegation (pre-season) ===
A total of 22 teams contested the league, including fifteen sides from the 2018–19 season, three relegated from the 2018–19 La Liga, and four promoted from the 2018–19 Segunda División B. This included the winners of the promotion play-offs.

Teams promoted to La Liga

On 20 May 2019, Osasuna were the first team to be promoted to La Liga, ending a two-year run in Segunda División, following Granada's 1−0 win against Albacete. The second team to earn promotion was Granada after their 1−1 draw against Mallorca on 4 June 2019. This marks an end to a two-year run in the second division. The third and final team to earn promotion to La Liga was play-offs winner Mallorca, after coming back from a 2-goal deficit against Deportivo La Coruña on 23 June 2019. Mallorca left Segunda División only one year after promoting from the Segunda División B and achieving two consecutive promotions.

Teams relegated from La Liga

The first team to be relegated from La Liga were Rayo Vallecano. Their relegation was ensured on 5 May 2019, after Real Valladolid beat Athletic Bilbao 1−0, suffering an immediate return to the Segunda Division. The second team to be relegated were Huesca, who were also relegated on 5 May 2019 after a 2−6 home defeat to Valencia, also suffering an immediate return to the second tier. The third and final relegated club were Girona, who concluded their two-year stay in La Liga in a 1−2 away loss at Alavés on 18 May 2019.

Teams relegated to Segunda División B

The first team to be relegated from Segunda División were Reus, expelled on 18 January 2019, due to their failure to pay their players. This ended a three-year spell in Segunda División, whilst demoting them to the fourth tier. The second team to be relegated were Gimnàstic, who were relegated on 5 May 2019 after Albacete drew 0−0 against Numancia, ending a four-year run in the second division. The third relegated club was Córdoba, in a 0−1 away loss at Las Palmas on 12 May 2019. They ended a 12-year-spell in professional football in Spain, with one of those seasons in La Liga. The fourth and final relegated team was Rayo Majadahonda in a 3–4 away loss at Oviedo with a last-minute goal on 4 June 2019. Rayo returns to Segunda División B after a one-year stay in Segunda.

Teams promoted from Segunda División B

The first two teams to achieve promotion were Racing Santander and Fuenlabrada on 2 June 2019 after defeating Atlético Baleares and Recreativo on aggregate in the play-off semi-finals respectively. Racing Santander returned to the Segunda División after a four-year absence. Fuenlabrada went on to become Segunda División B champions as well as making its first-ever appearance in the Spanish second tier. The third team to clinch promotion to the Segunda División was Ponferradina on 29 June 2019, after defeating Hércules in the non-champions play-offs; they returned after a three-year absence from the Segunda División. The fourth and final team to get promoted was Mirandés on 30 June 2019, after also coming out victorious in the non-champions play-offs, this time against Atlético Baleares; Mirandés returned after a two-year absence from the Segunda División.

=== Stadia and locations ===
Location of teams in 2019–20 Segunda División
Location of teams in 2019–20 Segunda División (Canary Islands)

Team	Location	Stadium	Capacity
Albacete	Albacete	Carlos Belmonte	17,524
Alcorcón	Alcorcón	Santo Domingo	5,100
Almería	Almería	Juegos Mediterráneos	15,000
Cádiz	Cádiz	Ramón de Carranza	25,033
Deportivo La Coruña	A Coruña	Abanca-Riazor	32,660
Elche	Elche	Martínez Valero	33,732
Extremadura	Almendralejo	Ciudad de Almendralejo	11,580
Fuenlabrada	Fuenlabrada	Fernando Torres	5,400
Girona	Girona	Montilivi	13,450
Huesca	Huesca	El Alcoraz	7,638
Las Palmas	Las Palmas	Gran Canaria	31,250
Lugo	Lugo	Anxo Carro	7,070
Málaga	Málaga	La Rosaleda	30,044
Mirandés	Miranda de Ebro	Anduva	5,759
Numancia	Soria	Los Pajaritos	8,261
Oviedo	Oviedo	Carlos Tartiere	30,500
Ponferradina	Ponferrada	El Toralín	8,400
Racing Santander	Santander	El Sardinero	22,222
Rayo Vallecano	Madrid	Vallecas	14,708
Sporting Gijón	Gijón	El Molinón	30,000
Tenerife	Santa Cruz de Tenerife	Heliodoro Rodríguez López	22,824
Zaragoza	Zaragoza	La Romareda	33,608

=== Personnel and sponsorship ===
Team	Manager	Captain	Kit manufacturer	Shirt main sponsor
Albacete	(Andalusia) Lucas Alcaraz	(Basque Country (autonomous community)) Néstor Susaeta	Hummel	Seguros Solíss
Alcorcón	(Andalusia) Fran Fernández	(Community of Madrid) Laure	Kelme	Neev Energy
Almería	(Portugal) José Gomes	(Valencian Community) José Romera	Adidas	Arabian Centres
Cádiz	(Andalusia) Álvaro Cervera	(Albacete) Alberto Cifuentes	Adidas	Torrot
Deportivo La Coruña	(Galicia (Spain)) Fernando Vázquez	(Galicia (Spain)) Álex Bergantiños	Macron	Estrella Galicia 0,0
Elche	(Province of Burgos) Pacheta	(Andalusia) Nino	Hummel	TM Grupo inmobiliario
Extremadura	(Galicia (Spain)) Manuel Mosquera	(Uruguay) Gio Zarfino	Kappa	Destilerías Espronceda
Fuenlabrada	(Community of Madrid) José Ramón Sandoval	(Canary Islands) Juanma Marrero	Joma	Deliave
Girona	(Andalusia) Francisco	(Catalonia) Álex Granell	Puma	Marathonbet
Huesca	(Community of Madrid) Míchel	(Albacete) Jorge Pulido	Kelme	Huesca La Magia
Las Palmas	(Community of Madrid) Pepe Mel	(Canary Islands) Aythami Artiles	Hummel	Gran Canaria
Lugo	(Valencian Community) Juanfran	(Galicia (Spain)) Carlos Pita	Kappa	Estrella Galicia 0,0
Málaga	(Valencian Community) Sergio Pellicer	(Community of Madrid) Adrián González	Nike	Tesesa
Mirandés	(Basque Country (autonomous community)) Andoni Iraola	(Basque Country (autonomous community)) Gorka Kijera	Adidas	Miranda Empresas
Numancia	(Catalonia) Luis Carrión	(Valencian Community) Marc Mateu	Erreà	Andrà tutto bene
Oviedo	(Navarre) José Ángel Ziganda	(Asturias) Saúl Berjón	Adidas	Oviedo
Ponferradina	(Basque Country (autonomous community)) Bolo	(Alagoas) Yuri	Adidas	Herrero Brigantina
Racing Santander	(Valencian Community) José Luis Oltra	(Cantabria) Iván Crespo	Puma	Aldro
Rayo Vallecano	(Canary Islands) Paco Jémez	(Santiago del Estero Province) Óscar Trejo	Kelme	
Sporting Gijón	(Serbia) Miroslav Đukić	(Balearic Islands) Carlos Carmona	Nike	Interwetten, Integra Energía, Telecable, Nissan
Tenerife	(Valladolid) Rubén Baraja	(Canary Islands) Suso	Hummel	Turismo Tenerife
Zaragoza	(Aragon) Víctor Fernández	(Aragon) Alberto Zapater	Adidas	Caravan Fragancias

=== Managerial changes ===
Team	Outgoing manager	Manner of departure	Date of vacancy	Position in table	Incoming manager	Date of appointment
Huesca	(Andalusia) Francisco	Resigned	19 May 2019	Pre-season	(Community of Madrid) Míchel	1 June 2019
Girona	(Valladolid) Eusebio Sacristán	Resigned	20 May 2019	Pre-season	(Navarre) Juan Carlos Unzué	13 June 2019
Almería	(Spain) Fran Fernández	End of contract	10 June 2019	Pre-season	(Spain) Óscar Fernández	15 June 2019
Tenerife	(Spain) Luis César	End of contract	11 June 2019	Pre-season	(Spain) Aritz López Garai	21 June 2019
Numancia	(Spain) Aritz López Garai	Mutual consent	11 June 2019	Pre-season	(Spain) Luis Carrión	21 June 2019
Deportivo La Coruña	(Spain) José Luis Martí	End of contract	27 June 2019	Pre-season	(Spain) Juan Antonio Anquela	2 July 2019
Alcorcón	(Spain) Cristóbal Parralo	Sacked	30 June 2019	Pre-season	(Spain) Fran Fernández	1 July 2019
Mirandés	(Spain) Borja Jiménez	Signed for Asteras Tripolis	7 July 2019	Pre-season	(Spain) Andoni Iraola	10 July 2019
Almería	(Spain) Óscar Fernández	Sacked	3 August 2019	Pre-season	(Portugal) Pedro Emanuel	4 August 2019
Oviedo	(Argentina) Sergio Egea	Sacked	15 September 2019	22nd	(Spain) Javi Rozada	15 September 2019
Deportivo La Coruña	(Spain) Juan Antonio Anquela	Sacked	7 October 2019	20th	(Spain) Luis César Sampedro	7 October 2019
Girona	(Spain) Juan Carlos Unzué	Sacked	21 October 2019	11th	(Spain) José Luis Martí	28 October 2019
Almería	(Portugal) Pedro Emanuel	Mutual consent	4 November 2019	2nd	(Spain) José María Gutiérrez	5 November 2019
Racing Santander	(Spain) Iván Ania	Sacked	11 November 2019	21st	(Spain) Cristóbal Parralo	11 November 2019
Tenerife	(Spain) Aritz López Garai	Sacked	17 November 2019	18th	(Spain) Rubén Baraja	1 December 2019
Sporting Gijón	(Spain) José Alberto López	Sacked	21 December 2019	15th	(Serbia) Miroslav Đukić	22 December 2019
Lugo	(Spain) Eloy Jiménez	Sacked	26 December 2019	18th	(Spain) Curro Torres	27 December 2019
Deportivo La Coruña	(Spain) Luis César Sampedro	Sacked	27 December 2019	22nd	(Spain) Fernando Vázquez	29 December 2019
Málaga	(Spain) Víctor Sánchez	Sacked	11 January 2020	16th	(Spain) Sergio Pellicer	11 January 2020
Albacete	(Spain) Luis Miguel Ramis	Sacked	3 February 2020	19th	(Spain) Lucas Alcaraz	3 February 2020
Racing Santander	(Spain) Cristóbal Parralo	Sacked	4 February 2020	22nd	(Spain) José Luis Oltra	4 February 2020
Oviedo	(Spain) Javi Rozada	Sacked	18 February 2020	19th	(Spain) José Ángel Ziganda	18 February 2020
Fuenlabrada	(Spain) Mere	Sacked	10 March 2020	13th	(Spain) José Ramón Sandoval	11 March 2020
Almería	(Spain) José María Gutiérrez	Sacked	26 June 2020	3rd	(Portugal) Mário Silva	26 June 2020
Lugo	(Spain) Curro Torres	Sacked	29 June 2020	20th	(Spain) Juanfran	30 June 2020
Girona	(Spain) José Luis Martí	Sacked	30 June 2020	5th	(Spain) Francisco	30 June 2020
Almería	(Portugal) Mário Silva	Sacked	27 July 2020	4th	(Portugal) José Gomes	27 July 2020

== League table ==
Pos	Team	Pld	W	D	L	GF	GA	GD	Pts	Promotion, qualification or relegation
1	Huesca (C, P)	42	21	7	14	55	42	+13	70	Promotion to La Liga
2	Cádiz (P)	42	19	12	11	50	39	+11	69	Promotion to La Liga
3	Zaragoza	42	18	11	13	59	53	+6	65	Qualification to promotion play-offs
4	Almería	42	17	13	12	62	43	+19	64	Qualification to promotion play-offs
5	Girona	42	17	12	13	48	43	+5	63	Qualification to promotion play-offs
6	Elche (O, P)	42	16	13	13	52	44	+8	61	Qualification to promotion play-offs
7	Rayo Vallecano	42	13	21	8	60	50	+10	60 (Note: Rayo Vallecano finished ahead of Fuenlabrada on head-to-head points: Fuenlabrada 2–2 Rayo Vallecano, Rayo Vallecano 1–0 Fuenlabrada.)	
8	Fuenlabrada	42	15	15	12	47	40	+7	60	
9	Las Palmas	42	14	15	13	49	46	+3	57	
10	Alcorcón	42	13	18	11	52	50	+2	57	
11	Mirandés	42	13	17	12	55	59	−4	56	
12	Tenerife	42	14	13	15	50	46	+4	55	
13	Sporting Gijón	42	14	12	16	40	38	+2	54	
14	Málaga	42	11	20	11	35	33	+2	53 (Note: Málaga finished ahead of Oviedo on head-to-head points: Málaga 2–1 Oviedo, Oviedo 1–1 Málaga.)	
15	Oviedo	42	13	14	15	49	53	−4	53	
16	Lugo	42	12	16	14	43	54	−11	52 (Note: Lugo finished ahead of Albacete on head-to-head points: Albacete 0–1 Lugo, Lugo 1–0 Albacete.)	
17	Albacete	42	13	13	16	36	46	−10	52	
18	Ponferradina	42	12	15	15	45	50	−5	51 (Note: Ponferradina finished ahead of Deportivo La Coruña on head-to-head goal difference: Ponferradina 2–0 Deportivo La Coruña, Deportivo La Coruña 2–1 Ponferradina.)	
19	Deportivo La Coruña (R)	42	12	15	15	43	60	−17	51	Relegation to Segunda División B
20	Numancia (R)	42	13	11	18	45	53	−8	50	Relegation to Segunda División B
21	Extremadura (R)	42	10	13	19	43	59	−16	43	Relegation to Segunda División B
22	Racing Santander (R)	42	5	18	19	39	56	−17	33	Relegation to Segunda División B

Source: LaLiga Soccerway
Rules for classification: 1) points; 2) head-to-head points; 3) head-to-head goal difference; 4) goal difference; 5) number of goals scored
(C) Champions; (O) Play-off winners; (P) Promoted; (R) Relegated

=== Results ===
Home \ Away	ALB	ALC	ALM	CAD	DEP	ELC	EXT	FUE	GIR	HUE	LPA	LUG	MGA	MIR	NUM	OVI	PON	RAC	RAY	SPO	TFE	ZAR
Albacete	—	1–1	0–1	1–0	0–1	0–1	1–1	1–1	1–0	2–2	0–0	0–1	1–0	1–2	2–1	1–2	1–1	0–0	1–1	1–1	0–4	4–1
Alcorcón	0–1	—	2–2	3–0	0–1	1–2	0–2	1–1	2–0	0–2	1–1	2–2	1–0	1–2	2–2	1–3	3–1	1–0	3–2	0–2	0–0	0–3
Almería	3–0	0–1	—	1–2	4–0	0–2	3–2	0–0	3–1	1–0	0–1	0–0	0–0	3–1	2–0	2–0	2–3	0–1	3–2	1–0	1–2	1–1
Cádiz	0–1	1–1	2–1	—	0–0	0–0	2–1	0–1	2–0	1–0	2–0	2–1	0–1	3–3	2–4	2–0	3–1	1–0	1–1	3–1	0–2	1–1
Deportivo La Coruña	0–1	0–0	0–0	1–0	—	1–3	2–3	2–1	2–2	2–1	2–1	0–0	0–2	1–1	3–3	3–2	2–1	2–1	3–3	0–0	2–1	1–3
Elche	2–0	1–1	1–1	0–0	0–1	—	1–1	0–2	1–0	1–1	2–3	1–1	2–0	4–2	2–0	2–1	1–0	2–0	1–1	0–1	1–1	1–2
Extremadura	0–1	0–0	1–2	0–1	2–0	2–0	—	1–2	1–3	0–1	0–1	1–0	0–0	3–2	0–0	1–2	1–1	3–1	0–3	2–0	2–4	1–2
Fuenlabrada	0–1	3–4	2–2	1–0	1–1	3–1	1–1	—	0–1	3–2	0–0	0–1	0–0	2–2	2–0	2–1	1–1	1–0	2–2	2–0	1–0	2–1
Girona	1–1	0–0	1–0	2–1	3–1	0–2	3–1	2–0	—	1–0	1–0	3–1	1–0	0–3	2–0	1–1	2–0	0–0	3–1	1–1	1–0	1–0
Huesca	0–1	2–1	3–2	1–1	3–1	2–0	2–2	2–0	1–0	—	1–0	2–1	2–0	1–2	3–0	3–1	2–0	1–1	0–2	1–0	2–1	2–1
Las Palmas	3–2	1–1	0–3	1–2	3–0	1–1	5–1	1–3	0–0	0–1	—	1–0	1–1	1–0	3–1	3–1	3–0	2–2	1–1	1–0	0–0	0–1
Lugo	1–0	2–4	0–4	1–1	0–0	2–2	0–0	2–0	2–2	3–2	0–2	—	0–0	2–1	3–1	1–0	2–2	1–1	1–0	1–2	1–4	1–3
Málaga	0–0	2–0	0–1	1–2	1–0	3–3	1–1	0–0	2–0	1–3	1–1	1–1	—	2–2	2–1	2–1	1–0	2–0	1–1	0–0	2–0	0–1
Mirandés	1–1	2–2	2–2	1–2	1–0	1–0	2–0	2–1	1–1	2–0	2–1	1–1	1–1	—	2–1	2–1	1–2	0–0	0–0	0–0	0–0	1–1
Numancia	1–0	0–1	1–1	1–2	0–1	1–1	1–0	1–0	2–0	1–0	1–1	3–1	0–0	2–0	—	1–0	1–0	1–2	2–2	2–0	2–1	0–1
Oviedo	3–1	1–2	0–0	0–2	2–2	0–2	1–1	0–0	4–2	1–1	2–1	1–1	1–1	1–0	1–1	—	0–0	1–0	2–1	0–0	1–0	2–2
Ponferradina	1–1	1–1	2–1	0–0	2–0	2–1	0–0	0–3	1–1	3–1	0–2	0–1	1–0	2–0	1–1	2–1	—	1–1	1–1	1–0	4–0	1–1
Racing Santander	1–2	1–1	1–1	1–2	1–1	1–2	3–0	2–2	0–3	1–0	1–1	1–2	0–1	4–0	0–0	1–1	2–2	—	1–2	0–2	1–2	2–2
Rayo Vallecano	1–0	1–1	1–1	1–1	3–1	2–3	1–1	1–0	1–0	2–0	2–2	1–0	0–0	2–2	3–2	1–1	1–3	2–0	—	1–1	2–1	0–1
Sporting Gijón	2–0	1–3	4–2	1–0	1–1	1–0	0–1	1–0	0–0	0–1	4–0	2–0	2–1	2–2	0–1	0–1	1–0	1–1	1–1	—	0–2	4–0
Tenerife	4–2	0–0	1–3	1–1	1–1	1–0	1–2	0–1	1–0	0–0	0–0	1–2	0–0	4–1	3–2	0–1	1–0	3–3	0–0	2–1	—	1–1
Zaragoza	0–1	1–3	0–2	0–2	3–1	1–0	3–1	0–0	3–3	0–1	3–0	0–0	2–2	1–2	1–0	2–4	2–1	2–0	2–4	2–0	2–0	—

Source: La Liga
Legend: Blue = home team win; Yellow = draw; Red = away team win.

=== Positions by round ===
The table lists the positions of teams after each week of matches. In order to preserve chronological evolvements, any postponed matches are not included to the round at which they were originally scheduled, but added to the full round they were played immediately afterwards. The league suspension due to COVID-19 happened after most teams had played 31 matches.

Team ╲ Round	1	2	3	4	5	6	7	8	9	10	11	12	13	14	15	16	17	18	19	20	21	22	23	24	25	26	27	28	29	30	31	32	33	34	35	36	37	38	39	40	41	42
Huesca	7	2	6	5	5	7	5	4	4	3	4	6	4	4	2	4	3	3	3	5	3	4	4	3	3	4	4	4	4	4	4	4	4	4	4	3	2	2	2	2	2	1
Cádiz	2	3	1	1	1	2	2	1	1	1	1	1	1	1	1	1	1	1	1	1	1	1	1	2	1	1	1	1	1	1	1	1	1	1	1	1	1	1	1	1	1	2
Zaragoza	4	5	4	2	2	3	3	3	3	5	3	5	7	5	6	10	6	6	6	3	5	3	3	4	4	3	3	2	2	2	2	2	2	2	2	2	3	3	3	4	5	3
Almería	1	4	3	3	3	1	1	2	2	2	2	2	2	2	3	3	2	2	2	2	2	2	2	1	2	2	2	3	3	3	3	3	3	3	3	4	4	4	4	3	3	4
Girona	11	18	10	6	9	14	10	13	7	6	8	11	13	10	7	8	5	5	5	6	9	11	6	7	8	6	5	5	5	5	5	5	5	6	5	5	5	5	5	5	4	5
Elche	20	10	13	14	8	10	12	6	12	12	9	10	14	12	9	11	10	7	7	9	8	7	10	9	6	5	6	6	7	7	6	6	7	5	6	6	6	6	7	6	7	6
Rayo Vallecano	10	12	7	11	6	6	9	8	9	10	7	4	6	11	12	12	14	14	13	15	14	12	11	12	11	12	11	7	6	6	7	8	8	7	7	9	8	7	6	8	8	7
Fuenlabrada	3	1	2	4	4	5	4	5	5	4	6	3	3	3	4	2	4	4	4	4	4	5	5	5	5	8	7	9	8	10	13	10	12	12	11	13	9	10	8	7	6	8
Las Palmas	16	19	17	17	19	17	19	14	11	8	5	8	10	13	13	15	13	11	8	7	7	6	8	8	9	10	12	13	15	14	16	14	13	13	14	14	14	12	13	12	13	9
Alcorcón	6	7	5	7	10	4	7	10	10	14	11	9	12	9	11	7	7	10	11	13	12	13	13	13	12	13	13	11	10	8	10	9	10	11	9	7	7	9	11	11	12	10
Mirandés	9	15	22	13	16	20	20	20	20	21	17	15	15	16	15	13	11	12	12	10	10	9	9	10	10	11	10	10	12	11	8	7	6	8	10	10	12	13	10	13	9	11
Tenerife	21	9	16	16	11	11	14	9	14	16	15	19	17	17	18	18	16	17	19	19	20	18	18	17	18	16	15	17	16	16	12	13	14	14	12	8	10	8	9	9	10	12
Sporting Gijón	12	13	8	10	13	15	15	15	13	15	16	14	11	14	16	16	17	16	15	14	15	15	14	14	14	14	16	14	11	15	9	11	9	10	13	11	11	11	12	10	11	13
Málaga	8	6	11	15	17	16	17	18	19	19	21	20	16	19	17	19	19	19	18	16	16	16	16	16	15	17	17	15	14	13	15	15	15	15	15	15	15	16	14	15	15	14
Oviedo	15	16	20	22	22	22	22	22	22	22	18	16	18	18	19	20	21	18	16	17	17	17	17	19	19	18	18	19	21	20	17	18	20	16	16	19	17	19	17	14	14	15
Lugo	14	14	19	18	14	13	13	16	17	17	19	18	20	15	14	14	15	15	17	18	18	20	20	18	20	21	21	20	19	19	20	17	18	20	20	20	20	20	19	19	17	16
Albacete	22	11	15	8	15	8	6	7	8	7	10	7	5	6	10	6	9	9	9	12	13	14	15	15	16	19	19	18	18	18	18	20	17	17	18	17	18	17	18	20	18	17
Ponferradina	19	21	9	9	12	12	8	11	15	11	12	12	8	7	8	9	12	13	14	11	11	10	12	11	13	9	9	12	13	9	11	12	11	9	8	12	13	14	15	16	16	18
Deportivo	5	8	14	19	18	19	18	19	21	20	22	22	22	22	22	22	22	22	22	22	22	22	21	20	17	15	14	16	17	17	19	19	19	18	17	16	16	15	16	17	19	19
Numancia	17	22	12	12	7	9	11	12	6	9	13	13	9	8	5	5	8	8	10	8	6	8	7	6	7	7	8	8	9	12	14	16	16	19	19	18	19	18	20	18	20	20
Extremadura	13	17	21	21	21	21	21	21	16	13	14	17	19	20	20	17	20	21	21	20	19	19	19	21	21	20	20	21	20	21	21	21	21	21	21	21	21	21	21	21	21	21
Racing Santander	18	20	18	20	20	18	16	17	18	18	20	21	21	21	21	21	18	20	20	21	21	21	22	22	22	22	22	22	22	22	22	22	22	22	22	22	22	22	22	22	22	22

Promotion to La Liga
Qualification to promotion play-offs
Relegation to Segunda División B

Source: BDFútbol

== Promotion play-offs ==
Semi-finals
Elche	0	1	1
Zaragoza	0	0	0
Girona	1	2	3
Almería	0	1	1

Final
Elche	0	1	1
Girona	0	0	0

== Season statistics ==
=== Top goalscorers ===
Rank	Player	Club	Goals
1	(Uruguay) Cristhian Stuani	Girona	29
2	(Colombia) Luis Suárez	Zaragoza	19
3	(Brazil) Yuri	Ponferradina	18
4	(Uruguay) Darwin Núñez	Almería	16
4	(Spain) Stoichkov	Alcorcón	16
6	(Spain) Rubén Castro	Las Palmas	16
6	(Spain) Martín Merquelanz	Mirandés	16
8	(Spain) Alfredo Ortuño	Oviedo	15
9	(Spain) Álex Fernández	Cádiz	13
9	(Spain) Hugo Fraile	Fuenlabrada	13
9	(Albania) Armando Sadiku	Málaga	13
9	(Spain) Curro Sánchez	Numancia	13

=== Top assists ===
Rank	Player	Club	Assists
1	(Spain) Adri Embarba	Rayo Vallecano	11
2	(Spain) David Ferreiro	Huesca	9
2	(Spain) Martín Merquelanz	Mirandés	9
2	(Spain) Saúl Berjón	Oviedo	9
5	(Spain) Juan Cruz	Elche	8
5	(Spain) Manu García	Sporting Gijón	8
7	(Spain) Álvaro Cejudo	Racing Santander	7
7	(Spain) Íñigo Eguaras	Zaragoza	7
7	(Spain) Fidel	Elche	7
7	(Spain) Josan	Elche	7
7	(Spain) Salvi Sánchez	Cádiz	7
7	(Spain) Iñigo Vicente	Mirandés	7

=== Zamora Trophy ===
The Zamora Trophy was awarded by newspaper Marca to the goalkeeper with the lowest goals-to-games ratio. A goalkeeper had to have played at least 28 games of 60 or more minutes to be eligible for the trophy.

Rank	Player	Club	Goals against	Matches	Average
1	(Morocco) Munir	Málaga	29	37	0.78
2	(Spain) Alberto Cifuentes	Cádiz	30	36	0.83
3	(Spain) Diego Mariño	Sporting Gijón	35	40	0.88
4	(Spain) Biel Ribas	Fuenlabrada	30	29	1.03
4	(Spain) Álvaro Fernández	Huesca	35	34	1.03

=== Hat-tricks ===
Player	For	Against	Result	Date	Round	Reference
(Uruguay) Cristhian Stuani	Girona	Rayo Vallecano	3–1 (H)	8 September 2019	3	
(Spain) Fidel	Elche	Mirandés	4–2 (H)	3 November 2019	14	

Note

(H) – Home; (A) – Away

=== Discipline ===
==== Player ====
- Most yellow cards: 17
  - (Martinique) Mickaël Malsa (Mirandés)
- Most red cards: 3
  - (Spain) Sergio Tejera (Oviedo)

==== Team ====
- Most yellow cards: 137
  - Albacete
- Most red cards: 12
  - Cádiz
- Fewest yellow cards: 87
  - Extremadura
- Fewest red cards: 2
  - Elche

== Match ball ==
On 15 April 2019, Puma announced their official partnership with Segunda División to manufacture the official match ball for the Liga de Fútbol Profesional. This ended Segunda División's 23-year partnership with Nike.

== Average attendances ==
Attendances do not include games played behind closed doors.

Pos	Team	Total	High	Low	Average	Change
1	Zaragoza	329,107	28,098	10,798	21,940	+7.1%
2	Sporting Gijón	280,245	22,072	13,782	17,515	−4.7%
3	Deportivo La Coruña	261,635	27,151	8,457	17,462	−1.1%
4	Málaga	246,198	24,873	12,341	16,413	−11.4%
5	Cádiz	238,182	18,433	11,237	15,879	+19.6%
6	Oviedo	196,999	20,499	8,667	13,133	−2.2%
7	Racing Santander	189,878	20,158	9,785	12,659	+40.0%^{2}
8	Las Palmas	173,392	21,248	7,699	11,559	−5.3%
9	Tenerife	169,609	18,000	7,878	10,601	−5.5%
10	Almería	147,569	13,107	7,361	9,838	+40.8%
11	Elche	141,304	11,287	8,194	9,420	0.0%
12	Rayo Vallecano	142,723	10,447	5,876	8,920	−24.7%^{1}
13	Albacete	119,293	9,115	5,695	7,953	−18.1%
14	Girona	124,227	8,790	5,679	7,764	−28.1%^{1}
15	Extremadura	103,720	8,650	3,264	6,483	−35.6%
16	Huesca	101,412	7,202	5,264	6,338	−4.2%^{1}
17	Ponferradina	89,150	7,395	4,882	5,572	−0.7%^{2}
18	Fuenlabrada	76,477	5,344	4,563	5,098	n/a^{2}
19	Numancia	56,790	5,734	2,634	3,549	+2.9%
20	Lugo	53,939	5,296	2,434	3,371	−10.4%
21	Mirandés	49,708	4,058	2,624	3,107	+29.5%^{2}
22	Alcorcón	42,237	3,646	1,770	2,640	−6.6%
	League total	3,334,096	28,098	1,770	9,777	−7.6%

Source: La Liga
Notes:
1: Team played last season in La Liga.
2: Team played last season in Segunda División B.

== LFP Awards ==
=== Monthly ===
Month	Player of the Month		Reference
Month	Player	Club	Reference
September	(Senegal) Sekou Gassama	Almería	
October	(Honduras) Anthony Lozano	Cádiz	
November	(Spain) Fidel	Elche	
December	(Spain) Jonathan Viera	Las Palmas	
January	(Spain) Sabin Merino	Deportivo La Coruña	
June	(Spain) Rubén Castro	Las Palmas	

== Number of teams by autonomous community ==
Rank	Autonomous Community	Number	Teams
1	Andalusia	3	Almería, Cádiz and Málaga
1	Castile and León	3	Mirandés, Numancia and Ponferradina
1	Community of Madrid	3	Alcorcón, Fuenlabrada and Rayo Vallecano
4	Aragon	2	Huesca and Zaragoza
4	Asturias	2	Oviedo and Sporting Gijón
4	Canary Islands	2	Las Palmas and Tenerife
4	Galicia	2	Deportivo La Coruña and Lugo
8	Cantabria	1	Racing Santander
8	Castilla–La Mancha	1	Albacete
8	Catalonia	1	Girona
8	Extremadura	1	Extremadura
8	Valencian Community	1	Elche
