= Cristóbal Parralo =

Spanish footballer and manager

Cristóbal
Personal information
- Full name: Cristóbal Parralo Aguilera
- Date of birth: 21 August 1967 (age 59)
- Place of birth: Priego de Córdoba, Spain
- Height: 1.78 m (5 ft 10 in)
- Position: Right-back

Youth career
- Damm
- Barcelona

Senior career*
Years	Team	Apps	(Gls)
1986–1987	Barcelona B	41	(0)
1987–1989	Barcelona	20	(2)
1988–1989	→ Oviedo (loan)	28	(3)
1989–1991	Logroñés	72	(5)
1991–1992	Barcelona	11	(0)
1992–1995	Oviedo	109	(2)
1995–2001	Espanyol	214	(2)
2001–2003	Paris Saint-Germain	63	(0)
Total		558	(14)

International career
1985–1986	Spain U18	5	(0)
1985–1990	Spain U21	8	(0)
1991–1993	Spain	6	(1)
1998–1999	Catalonia	2	(0)

Managerial career
- 2008: Benfica (assistant)
- 2009: Peña Deportiva
- 2009: Girona
- 2012–2016: Damm (youth)
- 2016–2017: Deportivo B
- 2017–2018: Deportivo La Coruña
- 2018–2019: Alcorcón
- 2019–2020: Racing Santander
- 2021–2025: Racing Ferrol
- 2025–2026: Gimnàstic
- * Club domestic league appearances and goals

Cristóbal Parralo Aguilera (born 21 August 1967), known simply as Cristóbal as a player, is a Spanish former professional footballer, currently a manager.

He played mainly as a right-back, but could also appear as a central defender.

== Club career ==
A product of Barcelona's youth ranks, Cristóbal was born in Priego de Córdoba, Andalusia, and he made his professional debut in 1987–88, being regularly used as the Catalans lifted that season's Copa del Rey. Subsequently, he represented Real Oviedo and Logroñés, where solid displays earned him a return to the Camp Nou.

Cristóbal was scarcely played in his second stint, and returned to Oviedo: in the subsequent nine campaigns (three plus six at Barça neighbours Espanyol) he rarely missed a game, and left Spain in 2001 with 454 La Liga appearances to his credit. Aged 34, he still moved to Paris Saint-Germain, having two respectable Ligue 1 seasons before retiring at the end of 2002–03.

== International career ==
Cristóbal earned six caps for Spain, the first in a friendly in Oviedo with Uruguay on 4 September 1991.

== Coaching career ==
After a brief spell with former club Espanyol as director of football, Parralo joined countryman Quique Sánchez Flores at Benfica's coaching staff, for 2008–09. In early February 2009, he returned to his country and signed with lowly Peña Deportiva in the Segunda División B, being one of two managers in a relegation-ending season.

Parralo signed a one-year contract with Segunda División club Girona in June 2009. He was sacked on 26 October, with the team ranking penultimate with just seven points in nine matches.

On 24 October 2017, after Deportivo de La Coruña first-team manager Pepe Mel was fired due to poor results, Parralo moved from the reserve side and was appointed caretaker until the following 30 June. After only three months in charge, and after conceding 14 goals in the last three matches (which included 7–1 and 5–0 away drubbings against Real Madrid and Real Sociedad, respectively), he was relieved of his duties.

On 19 June 2018, Parralo was named coach of second division side Alcorcón. He extended his contract in October to last until the end of the 2019–20 campaign, but was ousted a year early when Fran Fernández was named in his place.

Parralo returned to the same league on 11 November 2019, replacing Iván Ania at a Racing de Santander side that had won one of 15 matches all season. He left by mutual consent the following 4 February, having won once in 11 games for the last-placed team.

On 10 February 2021, Parralo took over from the dismissed Emilio Larraz at the helm of third-tier Racing de Ferrol. He led the club back to the professional leagues after a 15-year absence in 2023, and renewed his contract at the end of the following season after finishing tenth.

Parralo was dismissed on 20 January 2025, with his side third-bottom in the table. He oversaw them in 164 matches, second only to Luis César Sampedro's 176. On 4 November, he replaced the latter at the helm of Gimnàstic de Tarragona in the Primera Federación, being sacked on 8 March 2026 after a 4–1 loss to Eldense.

== Career statistics ==
=== International goals ===
#	Date	Venue	Opponent	Score	Result	Competition
1.	24 February 1993	Benito Villamarín, Seville, Spain	Lithuania	1–0	5–0	1994 World Cup qualification

== Managerial statistics ==
As of 9 March 2026

Managerial record by team and tenure
Team	Nat	From	To	Record								Ref
Team	Nat	From	To	G	W	D	L	GF	GA	GD	Win %	Ref
Peña Deportiva	(Spain)	11 February 2009	25 June 2009	14	3	3	8	12	22	−10	21.43	
Girona	(Spain)	25 June 2009	26 October 2009	11	2	4	5	10	17	−7	18.18	
Deportivo B	(Spain)	27 June 2016	24 October 2017	50	34	8	8	98	36	+62	68.00	
Deportivo La Coruña	(Spain)	24 October 2017	4 February 2018	15	3	3	9	18	39	−21	20.00	
Alcorcón	(Spain)	19 June 2018	1 July 2019	44	15	10	19	37	43	−6	34.09	
Racing Santander	(Spain)	11 November 2019	4 February 2020	12	1	6	5	10	14	−4	8.33	
Racing Ferrol	(Spain)	10 February 2021	20 January 2025	164	73	45	46	198	163	+35	44.51	
Gimnàstic	(Spain)	4 November 2025	8 March 2026	17	5	4	8	18	24	−6	29.41	
Career total				327	136	83	108	401	358	+43	41.59	—

== Honours ==
=== Player ===
Barcelona

- La Liga: 1991–92
- Copa del Rey: 1987–88
- European Cup: 1991–92
- UEFA Cup Winners' Cup: 1988–89

Espanyol

- Copa del Rey: 1999–2000

Paris Saint-Germain

- UEFA Intertoto Cup: 2001
- Coupe de France runner-up: 2002–03

== See also ==
- List of La Liga players (400+ appearances)
