= Javi Rozada =

Spanish football manager (born 1982)

Personal information
- Full name: Javier Fernández-Rozada Álvarez
- Date of birth: 3 July 1982 (age 44)
- Place of birth: Oviedo, Spain

Managerial career
- Years: Team
- 2006–2008: Covadonga (youth)
- 2008–2010: Asturias (youth)
- 2010–2013: Oviedo (youth)
- 2013–2016: Lealtad
- 2017–2019: Oviedo B
- 2019–2020: Oviedo
- 2020: Racing Santander
- 2024–2025: Avilés Industrial
- 2025–2026: Krasava ENY Ypsonas
- 2026: AEK Larnaca

Javier Fernández-Rozada Álvarez (born 3 July 1982), known as Javi Rozada, is a Spanish football manager.

== Managerial career ==
Born in Oviedo, Asturias, Rozada graduated in law but started his career in 2006 as CD Covadonga's Alevín B manager. He subsequently worked at the youth categories of the Asturias autonomous team and Real Oviedo before being appointed manager of Tercera División side CD Lealtad in June 2013.

Rozada achieved promotion to Segunda División B in his first season in charge, and managed to stay in the category in the following two campaigns. On 3 May 2016, he announced his departure from the club, and spent a year unemployed before taking over Real Oviedo Vetusta on 10 July 2017.

On 5 June 2018, after another promotion to division three, Rozada renewed with the Carbayones for a further two years, and took the club to their best-ever position in 2018–19. On 15 September 2019, he was named at the helm of the main squad in Segunda División, replacing fired Sergio Egea.

Rozada's first professional match in charge occurred on 19 September 2019, a 1–1 home draw against Extremadura UD. The following 18 February, as the team fell into the relegation places, he was replaced by José Ángel Ziganda.

On 3 August 2020, Rozada was appointed as the new manager of Segunda División B side Racing de Santander, who had just been relegated from the Segunda División. On 21 December, he was dismissed.

On 7 May 2024, after more than three years without a club, Rozada was appointed as the new manager of Segunda Federación side Real Avilés Industrial CF, on a contract until June 2025, which also included the two relegation play-off matches against CD Manchego Ciudad Real. He led the club to promotion to Primera Federación in the 2024–25 campaign, but was sacked on 12 August 2025.

In December 2025, he became the head coach of the Cypriot club Krasava ENY Ypsonas FC.

== Managerial statistics ==
As of match played 31 May 2025

Managerial record by team and tenure
Team	Nat	From	To	Record								Ref
Team	Nat	From	To	G	W	D	L	GF	GA	GD	Win %	Ref
Lealtad	(Spain)	12 June 2013	16 May 2016	126	54	29	43	172	135	+37	42.86	
Oviedo B	(Spain)	10 July 2017	15 September 2019	90	46	26	18	149	80	+69	51.11	
Oviedo	(Spain)	15 September 2019	18 February 2020	24	6	10	8	30	34	−4	25.00	
Racing Santander	(Spain)	3 August 2020	21 December 2020	8	3	3	2	9	4	+5	37.50	
Avilés Industrial	(Spain)	7 May 2024	12 August 2025	47	21	18	8	70	45	+25	44.68	
Total				295	130	86	79	430	298	+132	44.07	—

== Honours ==
=== Manager ===
CD Lealtad

- Tercera División: 2013–14

Real Oviedo B

- Tercera División: 2017–18
