= Antxon Muneta =

Spanish football manager (born 1986)

Personal information
- Full name: Antxon Muneta Beldarrain
- Date of birth: 1 June 1986 (age 40)
- Place of birth: Bilbao, Spain
- Height: 1.68 m (5 ft 6 in)
- Position: Midfielder

Senior career*
| Years | Team | Apps | (Gls) |
| 2005–2006 | Portugalete | 29 | (1) |
| 2006–2007 | Zalla | 34 | (4) |
| 2007–2008 | Barakaldo | 30 | (6) |
| 2008–2010 | Osasuna B | 46 | (1) |
| 2010–2014 | Mirandés | 118 | (8) |
| 2014–2015 | Reus | 14 | (1) |
| 2015 | → Logroñés (loan) | 16 | (2) |
| 2015–2018 | Logroñés | 90 | (10) |
| 2018–2019 | Mérida | 32 | (5) |
| 2020 | Gimnástica Torrelavega | 7 | (0) |

Managerial career
- 2025: Mirandés (caretaker)
- 2026: Mirandés
- * Club domestic league appearances and goals

Antxon Muneta Beldarrain (born 1 July 1986) is a Spanish former professional footballer who played mainly as a midfielder, and is a current manager.

== Playing career ==
Born in Bilbao, Biscay, Muneta spent six of his first seven seasons in Segunda División B, representing Club Portugalete, Barakaldo CF, CA Osasuna B and CD Mirandés. In 2006–07 he competed in Tercera División, with Zalla UC.

In the 2011–12 campaign, Muneta scored four goals in 32 games to help Mirandés promote to Segunda División for the first time ever. He made his debut in the competition on 17 August 2012, playing the full 90 minutes in a 0–1 home loss against SD Huesca; on 15 September he scored his first league goal, in a 2–2 draw at Real Murcia.

Muneta was released by the Rojillos in the 2014 summer, and subsequently moved to CF Reus Deportiu in the third level. On 30 January 2015 he was loaned to fellow league team UD Logroñés, until June. He left the club in the summer 2018.

On 19 September 2018, Muneta signed with Mérida AD in the fourth division, featuring in 32 matches and scoring five goals as the season ended in promotion. He still left the club at the end of the year in June 2019, and remained without a club until the following 3 February, as he joined Gimnástica de Torrelavega on a deal for the rest of the season.

In July 2020, in the last match of the promotion play-offs, Muneta injured his meniscus and ligament in the knee, which required a surgery. He retired shortly after, aged 34.

== Post-playing career ==
On 9 June 2023, Muneta returned to Mirandés as a match analyst. On 3 November 2025, he was named caretaker manager of the first team, after Fran Justo was dismissed, and returned to his previous role after the arrival of Jesús Galván.

On 12 January 2026, Muneta was named manager of the first team until the end of the season, following the sacking of Galván. On 11 June, despite suffering relegation, he renewed his contract for a further year, but was sacked on 19 October.

== Managerial statistics ==
As of 19 October 2026

Managerial record by team and tenure
| Team | Nat | From | To | Record | | | | | | | | Ref |
| Team | Nat | From | To | G | W | D | L | GF | GA | GD | Win % | Ref |
|---|---|---|---|---|---|---|---|---|---|---|---|---|
| Mirandés (caretaker) | (Spain) | 3 November 2025 | 7 November 2025 | 1 | 1 | 0 | 0 | 2 | 1 | +1 | 100.00 | |
| Mirandés | (Spain) | 12 January 2026 | 19 October 2026 | 29 | 9 | 7 | 13 | 35 | 44 | −9 | 31.03 | |
| Career total | | | | 30 | 10 | 7 | 13 | 37 | 45 | −8 | 33.33 | — |
