= Imanol Idiakez =

Spanish footballer and manager

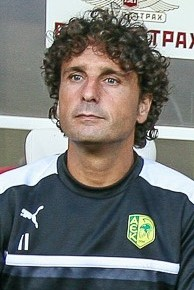
- Idiakez managing AEK Larnaca in 2016

Personal information
- Full name: Joseba Imanol Idiakez Barkaiztegi
- Date of birth: 14 March 1972 (age 54)
- Place of birth: San Sebastián, Spain
- Height: 1.79 m (5 ft 10 1/2 in)
- Position: Midfielder

Youth career
- Real Sociedad

Senior career*
Years	Team	Apps	(Gls)
1991–1993	Real Sociedad B	26	(2)
1993–1997	Beasain	93	(10)
1997–1999	Avilés	42	(4)
1999–2000	Burgos	16	(0)
2001–2003	Ciudad Murcia	69	(8)
2004	Linares	16	(1)
2004–2005	Girona	26	(0)
2005–2006	Reus	34	(3)
2006–2007	Burgos	28	(3)
Total		350	(31)

Managerial career
- 2008–2010: Real Sociedad B
- 2011: Poli Ejido
- 2011–2012: Guijuelo
- 2012–2013: Real Unión
- 2013–2014: Toledo
- 2014–2016: Lleida Esportiu
- 2016–2018: AEK Larnaca
- 2018: Real Zaragoza
- 2019: AEK Larnaca
- 2020–2022: Villarreal (assistant)
- 2022–2023: Leganés
- 2023–2024: Deportivo La Coruña
- 2025–2026: AEK Larnaca
- 2026: Cádiz
- * Club domestic league appearances and goals

Joseba Imanol Idiakez Barkaiztegi (born 14 March 1972) is a Spanish former professional footballer who played as a midfielder. He is currently a manager.

== Playing career ==
Born in San Sebastián, Gipuzkoa, Idiakez finished his development with Real Sociedad, making his senior debut with the reserves and also playing alongside his younger brother Iñigo. After leaving Sanse, he joined neighbouring Beasain.

Idiakez resumed his career mainly in the Segunda División B, representing Real Avilés, Burgos (two stints), Ciudad de Murcia – spending half a season in the Segunda División– Linares, Girona and Reus, before retiring in 2007 at the age of 35 due to a serious injury.

On 10 October 2001, while Ciudad were in the third division, they faced La Liga club Sevilla in the first round of the Copa del Rey. Idiakez scored twice in the 2–1 victory, once in his own net.

== Coaching career ==
Idiakez returned to Real Sociedad B after retiring, being appointed manager in the summer of 2008, relegated from the third division in his first season but winning promotion in the second. In March 2011, he signed with Polideportivo Ejido, being in charge for eight matches and eventually leading the team to safety.

In June 2011, Idiakez joined Guijuelo, moving the following campaign to Real Unión and Toledo on 3 July 2013, always in the third tier. After taking Lleida Esportiu to the promotion play-offs in the same level in 2016, he moved abroad for the first time in his entire career, signing for two years at AEK Larnaca in the Cypriot First Division.

Back to Spain, Idiakez was appointed manager of second division club Real Zaragoza on 18 June 2018, being sacked on 21 October. Shortly after, he replaced compatriot Andoni Iraola at the helm of his former side AEK.

Idiakez joined Villarreal's staff under Unai Emery in July 2020. He returned to head coaching duties on 6 June 2022, taking over from Mehdi Nafti at second-tier Leganés and being dismissed in April 2023.

On 1 July 2023, Idiakez signed for the Primera Federación's Deportivo de La Coruña. He achieved promotion in his debut campaign on a return to the professional leagues four years later, but was fired on 28 October 2024.

Following a third spell at AEK Larnaca, Idiakez returned to Spain on 22 April 2026, as Cádiz's third manager of the second-division season. After narrowly avoiding relegation, he left by mutual consent on 11 August four days before the start of the new campaign.

== Managerial statistics ==
As of match played 31 May 2026

Managerial record by team and tenure
Team	Nat	From	To	Record								Ref
Team	Nat	From	To	G	W	D	L	GF	GA	GD	Win %	Ref
Real Sociedad B	(Spain)	1 July 2008	3 June 2010	78	32	24	22	101	66	+35	41.03	
Poli Ejido	(Spain)	22 March 2011	15 June 2011	8	2	3	3	7	8	−1	25.00	
Guijuelo	(Spain)	15 June 2011	8 June 2012	38	16	10	12	45	44	+1	42.11	
Real Unión	(Spain)	8 June 2012	3 July 2013	38	14	13	11	53	39	+14	36.84	
Toledo	(Spain)	3 July 2013	30 June 2014	43	19	13	11	56	40	+16	44.19	
Lleida Esportiu	(Spain)	1 July 2014	26 June 2016	86	42	21	23	109	62	+47	48.84	
AEK Larnaca	(Cyprus)	26 June 2016	21 May 2018	100	61	23	16	202	91	+111	61.00	
Real Zaragoza	(Spain)	18 June 2018	21 October 2018	12	3	5	4	14	13	+1	25.00	
AEK Larnaca	(Cyprus)	15 January 2019	8 December 2019	37	19	13	5	65	34	+31	51.35	
Leganés	(Spain)	6 June 2022	4 April 2023	35	10	11	14	28	35	−7	28.57	
Deportivo La Coruña	(Spain)	1 July 2023	28 October 2024	54	27	16	11	86	49	+37	50.00	
AEK Larnaca	(Cyprus)	31 May 2025	4 March 2026	40	20	10	10	64	39	+25	50.00	
Cádiz	(Spain)	22 April 2026	11 August 2026	6	1	2	3	8	10	−2	16.67	
Total				575	266	164	145	838	530	+308	46.26	—

== Honours ==
=== Manager ===
AEK Larnaca

- Cypriot Cup: 2017–18
