= Juan Carlos Beltrán (footballer) =

Spanish football manager (born 1965)

Personal information
- Full name: Juan Carlos Beltrán Agoiz
- Date of birth: 17 December 1965 (age 60)
- Place of birth: Mallén, Spain
- Position: Defender

Team information
- Current team: Utebo (manager)

Senior career*
Years	Team	Apps	(Gls)
1986–1987	Mallén	16	(2)
1989–1993	Fraga	109	(8)
1993–1994	Sabiñánigo	32	(1)
1995–1997	Peralta	67	(5)
Total		224	(16)

Managerial career
- 2000–2001: Huesca
- 2001–2003: Figueruelas
- 2004: Barbastro
- 2004–2005: Tàrrega
- 2005: Barbastro
- 2007–2009: Ejea
- 2009–2013: Zaragoza (youth)
- 2013: Tudelano
- 2015–2016: Zaragoza (youth)
- 2018–2019: Utebo
- 2019–2020: Borja
- 2021–: Utebo
- * Club domestic league appearances and goals

Juan Carlos Beltrán Agoiz (born 17 December 1965) is a Spanish former footballer who played as a defender, and the manager of Utebo FC.

== Career ==
Born in Mallén, Zaragoza, Aragon, Beltrán only played for clubs in his native region, representing CD Mallén, UD Fraga, AD Sabiñánigo and CJD Peralta, all of them in Tercera División (apart from two seasons in Segunda División B with Fraga). After retiring, he was named manager of SD Huesca in the fourth division in 2000, replacing Vicente Arilla, and led them to a promotion to the third level.

In 2001, Beltrán took over CF Figueruelas also in the fourth tier, but left in 2003 after their relegation. In March 2004, after being close to a return to Huesca in January (the club opted to appoint Ángel Chamarro instead), he was named at the helm of UD Barbastro.

After a one-season spell at UE Tàrrega, Beltrán returned to Barbastro in 2005, but was sacked on 9 November of that year. He took over SD Ejea in 2007, leading the side to the top of their group in his first year but being dismissed in January 2009.

In 2009, Beltrán joined the structure of Real Zaragoza; initially a manager of the Juvenil B squad, he replaced Ander Garitano at the helm of the Juvenil A side when the latter was promoted to the reserves. He returned to the Juvenil B team ahead of the 2010–11 season, before departing the club on 13 May 2013.

On 21 June 2013, Beltrán was appointed CD Tudelano manager, but was relieved from his duties on 23 December. On 27 June 2015, after more than a year unemployed, he returned to Zaragoza after being named in charge of the Juvenil División de Honor squad.

After leaving the Maños in June 2016, Beltrán spent nearly two years without a club before being named Utebo FC manager in June 2018. On 26 May of the following year, he was announced as SD Borja manager, but left the club at the end of the campaign.

Beltrán returned to Utebo in 2021, and led the club to a first-ever promotion to Segunda Federación in his first year. On 9 March 2023, he renewed his contract with the club, and also reached two consecutive promotion play-offs in as many years.
