= 2009–10 División de Plata de Futsal =

División de Plata
- Season: 2009–10
- Promoted: Via-playoffs
- Relegated: see standings
- Top goalscorer: Luisjo (Gijón El Llano), 44 goals
- Biggest home win: BP Andorra 11–1 Lanzarote Tías Yaiza
- Biggest away win: Albacete 2010 1–11 Fisiomedia Manacor
- Highest scoring: Extremadura Delta Badajoz 10–7

The 2009–10 season of the División de Plata is the 17th season of second-tier futsal in Spain.

== Regular season ==
=== League table - Group Norte ===
Position	Club	Played	Wins	Draws	Losses	Goals for	Goals against	Points
1	GE Talavera	28	19	2	7	110	75	59
2	Burela	28	17	6	5	109	73	57
3	Gijón El Llano	28	16	3	9	121	101	51
4	BP Andorra	28	14	7	7	98	73	49
5	Colegios Arenas Gáldar	28	14	6	8	108	90	48
6	Obras y Estructuras RAM	28	12	4	12	105	97	40
7	Illescas	28	11	6	11	102	104	39
8	Extremadura Delta Badajoz	28	9	8	11	136	124	35
9	Lanzarote Tias Yaiza	28	10	5	13	96	108	35
10	Extremadura Cáceres 2016	28	10	4	14	95	118	34
11	La Muela	28	9	4	15	107	132	31
12	Camping El Escorial	28	8	6	14	104	113	30
13	OPDE Ribera Navarra	28	8	6	14	84	95	30
14	Avilés Oquendo	28	8	5	15	66	102	29
15	Valverde del Majano	28	8	2	18	95	131	26

promotion playoffs	relegated

=== League table - Group Sur ===
Position	Club	Played	Wins	Draws	Losses	Goals for	Goals against	Points
1	Fisiomedia Manacor	28	25	2	1	160	66	77
2	Puertollano Restaurante Dacho	28	20	4	4	127	64	61
3	UPV Maristas Valencia	28	15	8	5	127	77	50
4	Space Gasifred Ciutat d'Eivissa	28	13	6	9	115	98	45
5	UMA Antequera	28	14	3	11	106	105	45
6	Jumilla Montesinos	28	12	6	10	103	102	42
7	Melilla	28	11	6	11	94	100	39
8	ElPozo Ciudad de Murcia	28	11	5	12	85	86	38
9	Unión África Ceutí	28	9	7	12	86	94	34
10	Caravaca Cruz 2010 P. Reina	28	9	6	13	117	120	33
11	Bujalance C. Manzano	28	10	3	15	88	101	33
12	Albacete 2010	28	9	3	16	70	112	30
13	Ribera Alta Tobarra	28	9	2	17	77	117	29
14	Playas de Salou	28	7	4	17	99	135	25
15	Nazareno	28	2	1	25	68	145	7

promotion playoffs	relegated

== Playoffs for promotion ==
=== Group winners ===
==== First leg ====
May 7, 2010	GE Talavera	0–0 (a.e.t.) (5–4 p)	Fisiomedia Manacor	Talavera
21:30 (CEST)		Report		Stadium: Primero de Mayo; Attendance: 2,700; Referee: González Moreta, Redondo Arenales

==== Second leg ====
May 14, 2010	Fisiomedia Manacor	4–2	GE Talavera	Manacor
20:30 (CEST)		Report		Stadium: Miquel Ángel Nadal; Attendance: 1,000; Referee: Bernabéu Haro, Hidalgo Minaya

==== Third leg ====
May 15, 2010	Fisiomedia Manacor	1–1 (a.e.t.) (1–4 p)	GE Talavera	Manacor
20:30 (CEST)		Report		Stadium: Miquel Ángel Nadal; Attendance: 1,000; Referee: Crego Perez, Sánchez Romero

- The winner team is promoted to División de Honor: GE Talavera

Promoted to División de Honor
GE Talavera
(First time ever)

- The loser team continues in 2nd round: Fisiomedia Manacor

=== For remaining teams ===
==== First round ====
===== First leg =====
May 8, 2010	Space Gasifred Ciutat d'Eivissa	4–5	Burela	Ibiza Town
17:30 (CEST)		Report		Stadium: Insular de Sa Blanca Dona; Attendance: 700; Referee: Busquets González, Sánchez Ayala

May 8, 2010	BP Andorra	2–4	Puertollano Restaurante Dacho	Andorra la Vella
18:30 (CEST)		Report		Stadium: Polideportivo de Andorra; Attendance: 800; Referee: Pons Rodríguez, Sarrat Nuevo

May 8, 2010	UPV Maristas Valencia	5–3	Gijón El Llano	Valencia
19:00 (CEST)		Report		Stadium: Universidad Politécnica; Attendance: ¿? Referee: Hernandez Mesa, Rodríguez Vila

===== Second leg =====
May 14, 2010	Puertollano Restaurante Dacho	3–0	BP Andorra	Puertollano
20:30 (CEST)		Report		Stadium: Antonio Rivilla; Attendance: 1,200; Referee: Fernández Domínguez, Reyes Valdellos

May 14, 2010	Gijón El Llano	2–1	UPV Maristas Valencia	Gijón
21:30 (CEST)		Report		Stadium: Palacio de La Arena; Attendance: 1,500; Referee: Egia Echearte, Galbarriatu Ramos

May 15, 2010	Burela	3–2	Space Gasifred Ciutat d'Eivissa	Burela
18:30 (CEST)		Report		Stadium: Vista Alegre; Referee: Celador Hernández, Sánchez Chamorro

===== Third leg =====
May 16, 2010	Gijón El Llano	0–6	UPV Maristas Valencia	Gijón
12:00 (CEST)		Report		Stadium: Palacio de La Arena; Referee: Arce Ruiz, de Juana González

==== Second round ====
===== First leg =====
May 22, 2010	UPV Maristas Valencia	6–2	Fisiomedia Manacor	Valencia
18:00 (CEST)		Report		Stadium: Universidad Politécnica; Attendance: 500; Referee: Pons Rodríguez, Sarrat Nuevo

May 22, 2010	Burela	5–2	Puertollano Restaurante Dacho	Burela
18:30 (CEST)		Report		Stadium: Vista Alegre; Referee: González Moreta, Redondo Arenales

===== Second leg =====
May 28, 2010	Fisiomedia Manacor	4–2	UPV Maristas Valencia	Manacor
20:30 (CEST)		Report		Stadium: Miquel Ángel Nadal; Referee: Hernández Mesa, Rodríguez Vila

May 28, 2010	Puertollano Restaurante Dacho	6–4	Burela	Puertollano
20:30 (CEST)		Report		Stadium: Antonio Rivilla; Referee: Cotes García, Elena Pedrós

===== Third leg =====
May 29, 2010	Fisiomedia Manacor	3–2	UPV Maristas Valencia	Manacor
20:30 (CEST)		Report		Stadium: Miquel Ángel Nadal; Attendance: 900; Referee: Fernandez Dominguez, Reyes Valdellos

May 30, 2010	Puertollano Restaurante Dacho	3–0	Burela	Puertollano
12:30 (CEST)		Report		Stadium: Antonio Rivilla; Referee: Busquets González, Sánchez Ayala

==== Final Round ====
===== First leg =====
June 5, 2010	Puertollano Restaurante Dacho	3–4	Fisiomedia Manacor	Puertollano
19:30 (CEST)		Report		Stadium: Antonio Rivilla; Referee: Arce Ruiz, de Juana González

===== Second leg =====
June 11, 2010	Fisiomedia Manacor	1–2	Puertollano Restaurante Dacho	Manacor
20:30 (CEST)		Report		Stadium: Miquel Ángel Nadal; Attendance: 1,200; Referee: González Moreta, Redondo Arenales

===== Third leg =====
June 12, 2010	Fisiomedia Manacor	5–1	Puertollano Restaurante Dacho	Manacor
20:30 (CEST)		Report		Stadium: Miquel Ángel Nadal; Attendance: 1,000; Referee: Fernández Domínguez, Reyes Valdellos

- The winner team is promoted to División de Honor: Fisiomedia Manacor

Promoted to División de Honor
Fisiomedia Manacor
(2 years later)

== Top goal scorers ==
- ,

Player	Goals	Team
Luisjo	44	Gijón El Llano
Miguelín	43	Fisiomedia Manacor
Fabricio	38	Obras y Estructuras RAM
Carrión	33	Space Gasifred Ciutat d'Eivissa
Joan	33	GE Talavera
Néstor	33	Colegios Arenas Gáldar
Jordi Lledó	32	UPV Maristas Valencia
San Miguel	31	La Muela
Aramburu	29	Gijón El Llano
Baena	27	Extremadura Delta Badajoz

== See also ==
- 2009–10 División de Honor de Futsal
- División de Plata
