= José Luis Oltra =

Spanish football manager (born 1969)

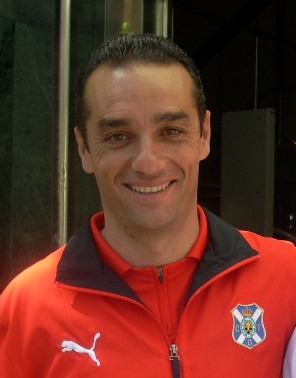
- Oltra as Tenerife manager in 2009

Personal information
- Full name: José Luis Oltra Castañer
- Date of birth: 24 March 1969 (age 57)
- Place of birth: Valencia, Spain
- Height: 1.75 m (5 ft 9 in)
- Position: Midfielder

Team information
- Current team: Alavés (assistant)

Youth career
- Valencia

Senior career*
Years	Team	Apps	(Gls)
1987–1991	Valencia B		
1991–1992	Sabadell	4	(0)
1992–1993	Sueca		
1993–1994	Levante	21	(2)
1994–1995	Yeclano	34	(7)
1995–1996	Elche	18	(0)
1996	Benidorm	4	(0)
1996–2000	Yeclano	120	(12)
2000–2001	Ontinyent		
Total		201+	(21+)

Managerial career
- 2001–2002: Catarroja
- 2002–2004: Castellón
- 2004–2005: Levante B
- 2005: Levante
- 2006–2007: Ciudad Murcia
- 2007–2010: Tenerife
- 2010–2011: Almería
- 2011–2012: Deportivo La Coruña
- 2013–2014: Mallorca
- 2014–2015: Recreativo
- 2015–2016: Córdoba
- 2017–2018: Granada
- 2018–2019: Tenerife
- 2020: Racing Santander
- 2021: Fuenlabrada
- 2022–2023: AEK Larnaca
- 2023–2024: Sevilla (assistant)
- 2025: Eldense
- 2026: Huesca
- 2026–: Alavés (assistant)
- * Club domestic league appearances and goals

José Luis Oltra Castañer (born 24 March 1969) is a Spanish former footballer who played as a midfielder. He is currently assistant manager of La Liga club Alavés.

== Playing career ==
Born in Valencia, Oltra spend the vast majority of his 14-year senior career in the lower leagues, representing Valencia Mestalla, Sueca, Levante, Yeclano (two spells), Elche, Benidorm and Ontinyent. During an eight-season haul in Segunda División B, he amassed totals of 193 games and 21 goals.

The exception to this was in the 1991–92 campaign, when Oltra was part of Sabadell's squad in the Segunda División. His debut as a professional took place on 8 September 1991, when he came as a second-half substitute in a 0–0 home draw against Real Avilés. He retired in 2001, aged 32.

== Coaching career ==
Oltra started working as a manager immediately after retiring, with amateurs Catarroja. In 2002, he was appointed at third division club Castellón, leaving two years later by mutual consent and joining another team in that tier, Levante B.

Late into 2004–05, Oltra replaced fired Bernd Schuster at the helm of Levante's first team for the last four matches. He was not able to prevent La Liga relegation, and was himself relieved of his duties on 1 November 2005 due to poor results.

From 2006 to 2009, Oltra continued to work in division two, with Ciudad de Murcia and Tenerife. After collecting 24 wins from 42 games in the latter season, he led the latter team to the third place and the subsequent promotion.

In an emotional press conference, Oltra left the Canary Islands club on 20 May 2010 after suffering relegation. He continued to work in the top flight in the 2010–11 campaign, being one of three managers in charge of Almería as they went on to rank in 20th and last position.

Oltra won the 2012 second-tier championship with his next team, Deportivo de La Coruña. He was sacked on 30 December of that year, after a 2–0 away loss to Espanyol left the Galicians last.

In the following seasons, always in the second division, Oltra coached Mallorca, Recreativo de Huelva, Córdoba, Granada, Tenerife, Racing de Santander and Fuenlabrada. He moved abroad for the first time in his career on 3 June 2022, being named manager of Cypriot First Division club AEK Larnaca.

In December 2023, Oltra became Quique Sánchez Flores' assistant at Sevilla. He returned to head coaching duties on 20 January 2025, signing with second-tier Eldense; unable to avoid relegation, he left in June.

On 16 March 2026, Oltra became Huesca's third manager of the second-division season. On 1 June, after another drop, he left, and paired up again with Flores at Alavés.

== Managerial statistics ==
As of match played 31 May 2026

Managerial record by team and tenure
Team	Nat	From	To	Record								Ref
Team	Nat	From	To	G	W	D	L	GF	GA	GD	Win %	Ref
Catarroja	(Spain)	30 June 2001	1 July 2002	34	15	11	8	49	32	+17	44.12	
Castellón	(Spain)	1 July 2002	8 July 2004	89	45	25	19	114	67	+47	50.56	
Levante B	(Spain)	8 July 2004	2 May 2005	34	14	12	8	34	22	+12	41.18	
Levante	(Spain)	2 May 2005	31 October 2005	15	4	5	6	14	20	−6	26.67	
Ciudad Murcia	(Spain)	8 July 2006	1 July 2007	43	18	9	16	53	46	+7	41.86	
Tenerife	(Spain)	1 July 2007	20 May 2010	128	47	36	45	176	185	−9	36.72	
Almería	(Spain)	24 November 2010	5 April 2011	24	8	5	11	35	49	−14	33.33	
Deportivo La Coruña	(Spain)	29 May 2011	30 December 2012	65	34	12	19	109	92	+17	52.31	
Mallorca	(Spain)	9 June 2013	24 February 2014	28	9	9	10	36	45	−9	32.14	
Recreativo	(Spain)	27 June 2014	10 February 2015	26	6	7	13	25	37	−12	23.08	
Córdoba	(Spain)	10 June 2015	27 November 2016	62	25	15	22	80	79	+1	40.32	
Granada	(Spain)	3 June 2017	19 March 2018	32	14	7	11	43	37	+6	43.75	
Tenerife	(Spain)	17 September 2018	12 May 2019	33	9	13	11	33	40	−7	27.27	
Racing Santander	(Spain)	4 February 2020	21 July 2020	16	3	3	10	13	23	−10	18.75	
Fuenlabrada	(Spain)	3 February 2021	14 December 2021	41	10	18	13	38	44	−6	24.39	
AEK Larnaca	(Cyprus)	3 June 2022	6 November 2023	68	30	18	20	99	86	+13	44.12	
Eldense	(Spain)	20 January 2025	4 June 2025	19	6	6	7	21	27	−6	31.58	
Huesca	(Spain)	16 March 2026	1 June 2026	12	1	4	7	12	21	−9	8.33	
Total				769	298	215	256	984	952	+32	38.75	—

== Honours ==
=== Manager ===
Castellón

- Segunda División B: 2002–03

Deportivo

- Segunda División: 2011–12
