= Jesús Galván =

Spanish footballer and coach

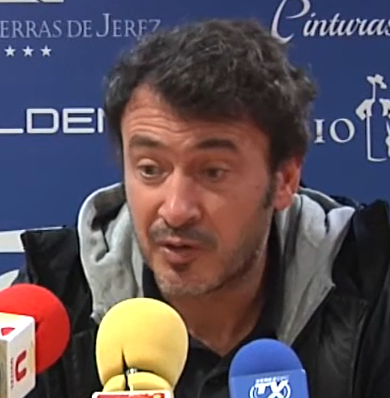
- Galván in 2019

Personal information
- Full name: Jesús Galván Carrillo
- Date of birth: 4 October 1974 (age 52)
- Place of birth: Seville, Spain
- Height: 1.73 m (5 ft 8 in)
- Position: Right-back

Team information
- Current team: Recreativo (manager)

Youth career
- Sevilla

Senior career*
Years	Team	Apps	(Gls)
1993–1996	Sevilla B	54	(8)
1996–1997	Sevilla	33	(2)
1998	Córdoba	11	(0)
1998–1999	Recreativo	32	(0)
1999–2003	Villarreal	88	(4)
2003–2004	Alavés	31	(0)
2004–2006	Recreativo	37	(0)
2006–2008	Lleida	68	(1)
Total		354	(15)

Managerial career
- 2009–2010: Sevilla (youth)
- 2010–2013: Sevilla B (assistant)
- 2013–2014: Alcalá
- 2014–2018: Sevilla (youth)
- 2018–2021: Utrera
- 2021: Gerena
- 2022–2023: Sevilla (youth)
- 2023–2025: Sevilla B
- 2025–2026: Mirandés
- 2026–: Recreativo
- * Club domestic league appearances and goals

Jesús Galván Carrillo (born 4 October 1974) is a Spanish retired footballer who played mainly as a right back, and is the current manager of Recreativo de Huelva.

== Playing career ==
Born in Seville, Andalusia, Galván made his professional – and La Liga – debut for local side Sevilla FC on 31 March 1996, in a game against Real Zaragoza. He appeared in 23 first-team matches during the 1996–97 season, but the club was relegated.

After a quick spell with neighbours Córdoba CF in the third division, Galván moved up to the second level but stayed in his native region, signing with Recreativo de Huelva. He would experience his most steady period, however, at Villarreal CF, which he represented four years, scoring a career-best four goals in his first as the Valencian side returned to the top flight after only one year of absence.

Released by Villarreal in the summer of 2003, Galván returned to division two with Deportivo Alavés. After a further two campaigns in that tier with his previous club, Recreativo, he closed out his career at nearly 34 in the lower leagues, with UE Lleida.

== Managerial career ==
In December 2008, Galván returned to his first club Sevilla as an assistant of the youth sides. In 2010, he became an assistant of Ramón Tejada in the reserve team, before being appointed manager of Tercera División side CD Alcalá on 10 July 2013.

On 1 July 2014, Galván returned to Sevilla and its youth sides, now being manager of the Infantil squad. He was appointed in charge of the Juvenil C squad in July 2017, but left the club to take over CD Utrera in the fourth division the following 9 April.

On 30 June 2021, Galván left Utrera after the club opted not to renew his contract, and was named at the helm of fellow league team CD Gerena just hours later. He was sacked by the latter on 20 December, and returned to Sevilla for a third stint on 13 July 2022, now in charge of the Cadete A team.

On 11 October 2023, Galván was appointed manager of Sevilla's B-team, replacing SD Huesca-bound Antonio Hidalgo. On 7 November 2025, he departed the side to take over CD Mirandés in the second level.

On 12 January 2026, Galván was sacked by Mirandés after winning just one of nine matches he'd overseen, which left the side rooted to the bottom of the table on 17 points. On 16 June, he was named in charge of Recreativo de Huelva in Segunda Federación.

== Managerial statistics ==
As of 22 November 2026

Managerial record by team and tenure
Team	Nat	From	To	Record								Ref
Team	Nat	From	To	G	W	D	L	GF	GA	GD	Win %	Ref
Alcalá	(Spain)	1 July 2013	30 June 2014	46	23	12	11	84	53	+31	50.00	
Utrera	(Spain)	10 April 2018	30 June 2021	106	52	27	27	150	95	+55	49.06	
Gerena	(Spain)	30 June 2021	20 December 2021	16	9	1	6	22	20	+2	56.25	
Sevilla Atlético	(Spain)	11 October 2023	7 November 2025	76	30	26	20	86	66	+20	39.47	
Mirandés	(Spain)	7 November 2025	12 January 2026	9	1	2	6	8	16	−8	11.11	
Recreativo	(Spain)	16 June 2026	Present	17	10	4	3	38	16	+22	58.82	
Total				270	125	72	73	388	266	+122	46.30	—

== Honours ==
Recreativo

- Segunda División: 2005–06
