= Emilio Larraz =

Spanish football manager

Personal information
- Full name: Emilio Larraz López
- Date of birth: 18 February 1968 (age 58)
- Place of birth: Zaragoza, Spain

Team information
- Current team: Zaragoza B (manager)

Youth career
- Years: Team
- Zaragoza

Managerial career
- 1990–1993: San Agustín (youth)
- 1993–1995: Stadium Casablanca (youth)
- 1995–1997: Oliver (youth)
- 1997–1998: Illueca
- 1998–2000: Endesa Andorra
- 2000–2002: FC Andorra
- 2003–2004: Sariñena
- 2004–2007: Andorra CF
- 2007–2009: Teruel
- 2009–2010: La Muela
- 2010–2011: Zaragoza B
- 2011–2013: Sariñena
- 2013–2014: Zaragoza B
- 2015–2018: Ebro
- 2018–2021: Racing Ferrol
- 2021–2025: Zaragoza B
- 2025: Zaragoza
- 2025–: Zaragoza B

Emilio Larraz López (born 18 February 1968) is a Spanish football manager, currently in charge of Deportivo Aragón.

== Coaching career ==
Born in Zaragoza, Aragon, Larraz started his career with hometown side San Agustín's youth setup in 1990. In 1998, after stints at Stadium Casablanca and Oliver, he was appointed manager of his first senior side, Illueca in Tercera División.

Larraz continued to manage in the category in the following campaigns, being in charge of Andorra CF (two stints, the first one under the name of Endesa Andorra), FC Andorra, Sariñena, Teruel and La Muela (achieving promotion to Segunda División B with the latter) before joining Real Zaragoza in 2010 as manager of the reserves, also in the fourth tier. He also achieved promotion with the B's, but left for Sariñena on 7 July 2011.

On 18 June 2013, after leading Sariñena to their first-ever promotion to the third tier, Larraz returned to Zaragoza and its B-team. He was dismissed in October of the following year, being appointed in charge of Ebro on 12 June 2015.

On 23 May 2018, despite finishing sixth and only four points shy of the play-offs, Larraz opted to leave Ebro. On 22 June, he was appointed in charge of Racing Ferrol, immediately achieving promotion to division three in his first season.

On 10 February 2021, Larraz was dismissed by Racing after more than two years in charge of the club. On 3 July, he returned to Zaragoza and their B-team for a third spell, now in Tercera División RFEF.

Larraz led Deportivo Aragón to a promotion to Segunda Federación in his first season, and renewed his contract until 2026 on 15 April 2024. On 12 October 2025, he replaced Gabi at the helm of the first team in Segunda División, but was demoted back to the B's just eight days later, after a 5–0 home loss to Cultural Leonesa.

== Managerial statistics ==
As of match played 18 October 2025

Managerial record by team and tenure
Team	Nat	From	To	Record								Ref
Team	Nat	From	To	G	W	D	L	GF	GA	GD	Win %	Ref
Illueca	(Spain)	July 1997	June 1998	38	17	11	10	59	42	+17	44.74	
Endesa Andorra	(Spain)	July 1998	June 2000	88	52	15	21	195	87	+108	59.09	
FC Andorra	(Andorra)	July 2000	June 2002	76	26	21	29	94	99	−5	34.21	
Sariñena	(Spain)	July 2003	June 2004	38	13	11	14	49	47	+2	34.21	
Andorra CF	(Spain)	July 2004	June 2007	120	56	40	24	201	127	+74	46.67	
Teruel	(Spain)	July 2007	June 2009	84	52	17	15	160	58	+102	61.90	
La Muela	(Spain)	8 July 2009	30 June 2010	44	32	8	4	81	27	+54	72.73	
Zaragoza B	(Spain)	3 July 2010	7 July 2011	40	24	8	8	77	33	+44	60.00	
Sariñena	(Spain)	7 July 2011	18 June 2013	82	49	23	10	142	53	+89	59.76	
Zaragoza B	(Spain)	18 June 2013	2 October 2014	48	33	6	9	106	46	+60	68.75	
Ebro	(Spain)	12 June 2015	23 May 2018	117	39	45	33	115	114	+1	33.33	
Racing Ferrol	(Spain)	22 June 2018	10 February 2021	82	38	20	24	132	86	+46	46.34	
Deportivo Aragón	(Spain)	3 July 2021	12 October 2025	143	63	35	45	205	171	+34	44.06	
Zaragoza	(Spain)	12 October 2025	20 October 2025	1	0	0	1	0	5	−5	0.00	
Deportivo Aragón	(Spain)	20 October 2025	present	0	0	0	0	0	0	+0	—	
Total				1,001	494	260	247	1,616	995	+621	49.35	—

== See also ==
- List of football managers with the most matches
