= Talavera FS =

Spanish futsal club

Talavera
- Full name: Talavera Fútbol Sala
- Nickname: --
- Founded: 1990
- Ground: 1º de Mayo, Talavera de la Reina, Castile-La Mancha, Spain
- Capacity: 3,000
- 2012–13: 2ª División B – Group 4, 2nd
Home colours	Away colours

Talavera Fútbol Sala was a futsal club based in Talavera de la Reina, city of the province of Toledo in the autonomous community of Castile-La Mancha.

The club was founded in 1990 and her stadium is Pabellón 1º de Mayo with 3,000 seaters.

The club was sponsored by Azulejos Ramos until 2008–09 season. From 2010–11 to 2011–12, the club was sponsored by Organización Impulsora de Discapacitados (OID).

== History ==
Talavera Fútbol Sala was founded in 1990. During a long time, Talavera FS was the reserve side of CLM Talavera. On May 15, 2010, GE Talavera achieved the promotion to División de Honor for first time in its history, by winning the promotion playoff to Fisiomedia Manacor.

Before 2012–13 season, Talavera was not admitted by LNFS due to failing to meet the financial criteria to play in Primera División. They were accepted to play in Segunda División B.

In July 2013, after 23 years of sporting activity, the club was disbanded due to unpaid debts (€300,000) and lack of support from public and private organizations.

== Season to season ==
Season	Tier	Division	Place	Copa de España
1990/91	3	1ª Nacional B	—	
1991/92	3	1ª Nacional B	—	
1992/93	2	1ª Nacional A	—	
1993/94	2	1ª Nacional A	—	
1994/95	3	1ª Nacional A	—	
1998/99	3	1ª Nacional A	—	
1999/00	4	1ª Nacional B	—	
2000/01	4	1ª Nacional B	—	
2001/02	3	1ª Nacional A	—	
2002/03	3	1ª Nacional A	—	

Season	Tier	Division	Place	Copa de España
2003/04	2	D. Plata	6th	
2004/05	2	D. Plata	12th	
2005/06	2	D. Plata	10th	
2006/07	2	D. Plata	10th	
2007/08	2	D. Plata	8th	
2008/09	2	D. Plata	4th	
2009/10	2	D. Plata	1st	
2010/11	1	D. Honor	12th	
2011/12	1	1ª División	11th	
2012/13	3	2ª División B	2nd	

- 1 seasons in Primera División
- 7 seasons in Segunda División
- 7 seasons in Segunda División B
- 4 seasons in Tercera División

== Current squad ==
As of 15 June 2019

#	Position	Name	Nationality
1	Goalkeeper	Nacho Fernández	(Spain)
2	Winger	Aarón López	(Spain)
3	Winger	Chencho Delgado	(Spain)
7	Defender	Justo Cáceres	(Spain)
8	Winger	Josete Díaz	(Spain)
9	Pivot	Chino Donoso	(Spain)
10	Winger	Jesús Jiménez	(Spain)
11	Winger	Cristian Panucci	(Spain)
12	Winger	Caio Alves	(Brazil)
13	Defender	Quique Hernando	(Spain)
14	Defender	David Asensio	(Spain)
15	Goalkeeper	Rafa Luque	(Spain)
19	Winger	Anass Essaadi	(Morocco)
21	Winger	Sergio González	(Spain)
23	Goalkeeper	Gonzalo Puebla	(Spain)

== pavilion information ==
- Name: - 1º de Mayo
- City: - Talavera de la Reina
- Capacity: - 3,000
- Address: - C/ Nicaragua, s/n
- Inaugurated: - May 1, 1987
