= CD Covadonga =

Association football club in Spain

Coordinates: 43.378693°N 5.837081°W

Covadonga
- Full name: Club Deportivo Covadonga
- Founded: 31 July 1979; 47 years ago
- Ground: Estadio Juan Antonio Álvarez Rabanal, Oviedo, Asturias, Spain
- Capacity: 2,000
- President: Francisco Cabal Díaz
- Head coach: Fermín Álvarez
- League: Tercera Federación – Group 2
- 2025–26: Tercera Federación – Group 2, 2nd of 18
Home colours	Away colours

Club Deportivo Covadonga is a Spanish football team based in Oviedo, in the autonomous community of Asturias. Founded in 1979 it plays in Tercera Federación – Group 2, holding home games at Estadio Juan Antonio Álvarez Rabanal, with a 2,000-seat capacity.

== History ==
CD Covadonga was founded in 1979 by José Antonio Álvarez Rabanal, priest of the parish of Our Lady of Covadonga, Oviedo, with the aim to give a way to development as people to the local youth.

It started to play its games in the Asturian Regional divisions in the field of the Fundación Masaveu while the club was negotiating with the Oviedo City Hall for the transfer of a piece of ground in Los Castañales, neighbourhood of Teatinos, for building a new football field.

In 1998 the team promoted for the first time to Tercera División. Fifteen years later, in 2013, the club finished the league in third position and qualifies for the 2013 Tercera División play-offs, but it was eliminated in the first round by Don Benito.

Covadonga repeated participation in the playoffs in 2019, but was clearly defeated again in the first round, this time by Bergantiños. However, the club achieved promotion in their third attempt, after defeating Llanera and Caudal in the playoffs.

== Season to season ==
Season	Tier	Division	Place	Copa del Rey
1979–80	7	2ª Reg.	12th	
1980–81	7	2ª Reg.	9th	
1981–82	7	2ª Reg.	1st	
1982–83	6	1ª Reg.	8th	
1983–84	6	1ª Reg.	16th	
1984–85	6	1ª Reg.	17th	
1985–86	7	2ª Reg.	5th	
1986–87	7	2ª Reg.	5th	
1987–88	7	2ª Reg.	1st	
1988–89	7	2ª Reg.	2nd	
1989–90	6	1ª Reg.	6th	
1990–91	6	1ª Reg.	9th	
1991–92	6	1ª Reg.	5th	
1992–93	6	1ª Reg.	5th	
1993–94	6	1ª Reg.	5th	
1994–95	6	1ª Reg.	8th	
1995–96	6	1ª Reg.	2nd	
1996–97	5	Reg. Pref.	14th	
1997–98	5	Reg. Pref.	2nd	
1998–99	4	3ª	18th	

Season	Tier	Division	Place	Copa del Rey
1999–2000	5	Reg. Pref.	4th	
2000–01	4	3ª	20th	
2001–02	4	Reg. Pref.	3rd	
2002–03	4	3ª	16th	
2003–04	5	Reg. Pref.	4th	
2004–05	5	Reg. Pref.	4th	
2005–06	4	3ª	9th	
2006–07	4	3ª	16th	
2007–08	5	Reg. Pref.	4th	
2008–09	4	3ª	13th	
2009–10	4	3ª	19th	
2010–11	5	Reg. Pref.	1st	
2011–12	4	3ª	11th	
2012–13	4	3ª	3rd	
2013–14	4	3ª	5th	
2014–15	4	3ª	5th	
2015–16	4	3ª	11th	
2016–17	4	3ª	7th	
2017–18	4	3ª	5th	
2018–19	4	3ª	4th	

Season	Tier	Division	Place	Copa del Rey
2019–20	4	3ª	3rd	
2020–21	3	2ª B	10th / 8th	
2021–22	5	3ª RFEF	10th	
2022–23	5	3ª Fed.	1st	
2023–24	4	2ª Fed.	18th	First round
2024–25	5	3ª Fed.	3rd	
2025–26	5	3ª Fed.	2nd	
2026–27	5	3ª Fed.		First round

- 1 season in Segunda División B
- 1 season in Segunda Federación
- 16 seasons in Tercera División
- 5 seasons in Tercera Federación/Tercera División RFEF

== Current squad ==
As of August 2024

Note: Flags indicate national team as defined under FIFA eligibility rules; some limited exceptions apply. Players may hold more than one non-FIFA nationality.

No.	Pos.	Nation	Player
1	GK	GER	Björn Bussmann
2	DF	ESP	Berto González
3	DF	ESP	Álvaro García
4	DF	ESP	Carlos Figar
5	DF	ESP	Álex Menéndez
6	MF	ESP	Emilio Morilla
7	MF	ESP	Omar Álvarez
8	MF	ESP	Pablo Tineo
9	FW	ESP	Ariel Herrero
11	FW	ESP	Samu Pérez

No.	Pos.	Nation	Player
12	MF	ESP	Lucas Suárez
13	GK	ESP	Carlos Aramburu
14	DF	ESP	Aitor Elena
15	FW	ESP	Adrián Turmo
17	MF	ESP	José Álvarez
18	DF	ESP	Adrián Trabanco
19	FW	ESP	Vicente Álvarez
20	MF	ESP	Dani González
21	MF	ESP	Pelayo Avanzini
22	FW	ESP	Iván Fernández

== Famous players ==
- (Spain) Iván Ania
- (Spain) Santi Cazorla (youth)

== Women's team ==
On 26 November 2017, CD Covadonga announced the creation of a new women's team that would start competing in the 2018–19 season. It previously existed until it was disbanded in 1997.

=== Season by season ===
Season	Division	Place	Copa de la Reina
1996/97	Regional	11th	
1997/98	Regional	12th	
1998–18	DNP		
2018/19	Regional	17th	
2019/20	Regional	5th	
