= CD Mallén =

Spanish football team

Mallén
- Full name: Club Deportivo Mallén
- Founded: 1920
- Ground: San Sebastián, Mallén, Aragón, Spain
- Capacity: 1,500
- Chairman: (Spain) Diego Yoldi
- Manager: (Spain) José Cuadal
- League: Regional Preferente – Group 1
- 2024–25: Regional Preferente – Group 2, 9th of 18
Home colours	Away colours

Club Deportivo Mallén is a Spanish football team based in Mallén, in the autonomous community of Aragón. Founded in 1920, it plays in Regional Preferente – Group 1, holding home games at San Sebastián, with a 1,500-seat capacity.

== Season to season ==
Season	Tier	Division	Place	Copa del Rey
1958–59	5	2ª Reg.	3rd	
1959–60	5	2ª Reg.	3rd	
1960–61	4	1ª Reg.	1st	
1961–62	4	1ª Reg.	4th	
1962–1971	DNP			
1971–72	6	2ª Reg.	8th	
1972–73	7	2ª Reg.	5th	
1973–74	7	2ª Reg.	8th	
1974–75	7	2ª Reg.	3rd	
1975–76	7	2ª Reg.	1st	
1976–77	6	2ª Reg. P.	5th	
1977–78	6	1ª Reg.	8th	
1978–79	6	1ª Reg.	9th	
1979–80	6	1ª Reg.	14th	
1980–81	6	1ª Reg.	11th	
1981–82	6	1ª Reg.	3rd	
1982–83	6	1ª Reg.	7th	
1983–84	6	1ª Reg.	1st	
1984–85	5	Reg. Pref.	15th	
1985–86	5	Reg. Pref.	11th	

Season	Tier	Division	Place	Copa del Rey
1986–87	4	3ª	11th	
1987–88	4	3ª	16th	
1988–89	4	3ª	15th	
1989–90	4	3ª	6th	
1990–91	4	3ª	14th	
1991–92	4	3ª	14th	
1992–93	4	3ª	20th	
1993–94	5	Reg. Pref.	10th	
1994–95	5	Reg. Pref.	13th	
1995–96	5	Reg. Pref.	10th	
1996–97	5	Reg. Pref.	11th	
1997–98	5	Reg. Pref.	3rd	
1998–99	5	Reg. Pref.	13th	
1999–2000	5	Reg. Pref.	7th	
2000–01	5	Reg. Pref.	9th	
2001–02	5	Reg. Pref.	10th	
2002–03	5	Reg. Pref.	1st	
2003–04	4	3ª	17th	
2004–05	5	Reg. Pref.	2nd	
2005–06	4	3ª	18th	

Season	Tier	Division	Place	Copa del Rey
2006–07	5	Reg. Pref.	7th	
2007–08	5	Reg. Pref.	13th	
2008–09	5	Reg. Pref.	2nd	
2009–10	4	3ª	16th	
2010–11	4	3ª	20th	
2011–12	5	Reg. Pref.	3rd	
2012–13	5	Reg. Pref.	8th	
2013–14	5	Reg. Pref.	11th	
2014–15	5	Reg. Pref.	8th	
2015–16	5	Reg. Pref.	11th	
2016–17	5	Reg. Pref.	9th	
2017–18	5	Reg. Pref.	12th	
2018–19	5	Reg. Pref.	9th	
2019–20	5	Reg. Pref.	10th	
2020–21	5	Reg. Pref.	8th	
2021–22	6	Reg. Pref.	13th	
2022–23	7	1ª Reg.	2nd	
2023–24	6	Reg. Pref.	12th	
2024–25	6	Reg. Pref.	9th	
2025–26	6	Reg. Pref.		

- 11 seasons in Tercera División
