= Jon Gorrotxategi (footballer, born 1989) =

Spanish football manager (born 1989)

Personal information
- Full name: Jon Gorrotxategi Zarraua
- Date of birth: 15 November 1989 (age 36)
- Place of birth: Deba, Spain
- Height: 1.79 m (5 ft 10 in)
- Position: Midfielder

Team information
- Current team: Real Sociedad B (individual performance coach)

Youth career
- Real Sociedad

Senior career*
Years	Team	Apps	(Gls)
2008–2009	Basconia	22	(1)
2009–2012	Eibar B		
2012–2013	Las Rozas		
2013–2014	Rayo Majadahonda		
2014–2015	Villanueva Pardillo	32	(0)
2015–2016	Móstoles URJC	19	(0)
2016–2017	Internacional Madrid	30	(0)

Managerial career
- 2019: Real Sociedad B (assistant)
- 2025: Real Sociedad B (caretaker)
- * Club domestic league appearances and goals

Jon Gorrotxategi Zarraua (born 15 November 1989) is a Spanish retired footballer who played as a midfielder, and the current individual performance coach of Real Sociedad B.

== Playing career ==
Born in Deba, Gipuzkoa, Basque Country, Gorrotxategi was a Real Sociedad youth graduate before joining the structure of Athletic Bilbao in 2008, being initially assigned to farm team CD Basconia. In June 2009, he moved to SD Eibar and became a member of their reserve team also in Tercera División.

After leaving the Armeros in 2012, Gorrotxategi subsequently resumed his career in the fourth division, representing teams from the Community of Madrid: Las Rozas CF, CF Rayo Majadahonda, FC Villanueva del Pardillo, CD Móstoles URJC and Internacional de Madrid. He retired with the latter in 2017, aged 27.

== Managerial career ==
Shortly after retiring, Gorrotxategi returned to his first club Real Sociedad as an individual performance coach. In January 2019, he became the assistant manager of Aitor Zulaika in the reserves, before returning to his previous role in June.

On 18 December 2025, after Ion Ansotegi was appointed caretaker manager of the first team, Gorrotxategi took over the B-team on the same manner, for the upcoming Segunda División match against AD Ceuta FC. On his professional debut three days later, his side lost 3–1 in Ceuta.
