= Borja Jiménez =

Spanish football manager (born 1985)

Personal information
- Full name: Borja Jiménez Sáez
- Date of birth: 21 January 1985 (age 41)
- Place of birth: Ávila, Spain

Team information
- Current team: Cádiz (manager)

Managerial career
- Years: Team
- 2006–2009: Ávila (youth)
- 2009–2010: Milan Academy (youth)
- 2010–2011: Casa Social (youth)
- 2011–2013: Ávila (assistant)
- 2013–2014: Ávila
- 2015: Valladolid (youth)
- 2015–2016: Valladolid B
- 2016–2017: Izarra
- 2017–2018: Rápido Bouzas
- 2018–2019: Mirandés
- 2019: Asteras Tripolis
- 2019–2020: Cartagena
- 2021–2022: Deportivo La Coruña
- 2023–2025: Leganés
- 2025–2026: Sporting Gijón
- 2026: Al Ahli
- 2026–: Cádiz

Borja Jiménez Sáez (born 21 January 1985) is a Spanish football manager, who is currently in charge of Cádiz CF.

== Coaching career ==
Born in Ávila, Castile and León, Jiménez started his career in 2006, with Real Ávila's youth setup. He left the club in 2009 and subsequently worked in the youth ranks at A.C. Milan Academy and Casa Social Católica, before returning to Ávila in 2011 as José Luis Diezma's assistant.

On 10 October 2013, Jiménez replaced sacked Kiko Sánchez as Ávila's first team manager. On 17 November 2014, after a run of poor results, he resigned.

Jiménez joined Real Valladolid in June 2015, as a manager of the Cadete A. On 22 October, however, he was appointed manager of the reserves in Segunda División B, and managed to avoid relegation with the side; on 30 May 2016, he announced his departure.

On 1 June 2016, Jiménez was named manager of CD Izarra still in the third division. On 10 July of the following year, after another mid-table finish, he was appointed at the helm of fellow league team Rápido de Bouzas.

After taking Rápido to an impressive fifth position, Jiménez was appointed manager of CD Mirandés on 28 June 2018, still in division three. He finished his first season in charge with a promotion to Segunda División through the play-offs.

On 5 July 2019, Jiménez left the Rojillos after the club failed to reach an agreement for the renewal of his contract, and he was appointed manager of Asteras Tripolis two days later. His first professional match in charge occurred on 24 August, a 0–1 loss at Olympiacos. He was relieved of his duties on 4 December 2019 despite winning 3–2 after extra time over Platanias in the second leg of the Greek Cup fifth round the same day.

Jiménez returned to his country's third division before the end of the year, taking the helm of FC Cartagena after Gustavo Munúa quit for Club Nacional de Football in his native Uruguay. In July 2020, he won them promotion to the second tier for the first time in eight years, with a penalty shootout play-off victory over CD Atlético Baleares.

Jiménez was sacked on 18 December 2020, after a Copa del Rey elimination to third division side Pontevedra CF. The following 26 May, he was named in charge of Primera División RFEF's Deportivo de La Coruña.

Jiménez narrowly missed out promotion after an extra-time loss to Albacete Balompié in the 2022 play-off final, and was dismissed by Dépor on 11 October 2022, after a poor start of the season. On 6 June of the following year, he was appointed at the helm of CD Leganés in the second division.

Jiménez led Lega to a top tier promotion as champions in his first season, and had his contract automatically renewed for a further year. On 26 May 2025, after suffering immediate relegation, he left the club.

On 8 October 2025, Jiménez was named Sporting de Gijón manager on a contract until 2027. The following 8 May, however, the club announced that they reached an agreement with Jiménez to end their contractual relationship at the end of the season.

On 3 July 2026, Jiménez was appointed manager of Al Ahli SC in Qatar, but left the club on 22 October to take over Cádiz CF back in his home country's second division.

== Managerial statistics ==
As of 3 June 2026

Managerial record by team and tenure
Team	Nat	From	To	Record								Ref.
Team	Nat	From	To	G	W	D	L	GF	GA	GD	Win %	Ref.
Ávila	(Spain)	10 October 2013	17 November 2014	45	19	11	15	60	44	+16	42.22	
Valladolid B	(Spain)	22 October 2015	30 May 2016	29	11	4	14	35	40	−5	37.93	
Izarra	(Spain)	1 June 2016	10 July 2017	38	11	13	14	37	45	−8	28.95	
Rápido Bouzas	(Spain)	10 July 2017	17 May 2018	41	15	16	10	39	34	+5	36.59	
Mirandés	(Spain)	28 June 2018	5 July 2019	55	27	18	10	82	51	+31	49.09	
Asteras Tripolis	(Greece)	7 July 2019	4 December 2019	14	5	2	7	18	19	−1	35.71	
Cartagena	(Spain)	23 December 2019	18 December 2020	31	9	9	13	36	39	−3	29.03	
Deportivo La Coruña	(Spain)	26 May 2021	11 October 2022	49	27	11	11	77	42	+35	55.10	
Leganés	(Spain)	6 June 2023	26 May 2025	87	33	28	26	108	93	+15	37.93	
Sporting Gijón	(Spain)	8 October 2025	31 May 2026	37	17	7	13	52	42	+10	45.95	
Total				426	174	119	133	544	449	+95	40.85	—

== Honours ==
Leganés

- Segunda División: 2023–24
