= CD Sariñena =

Association football club in Spain

Sariñena
- Full name: Club Deportivo Sariñena
- Founded: 1945
- Dissolved: 2026
- Ground: El Carmen, Sariñena, Aragon, Spain
- Capacity: 4,500
- President: (Spain) Joaquín López
- Head coach: (Spain) Manu Tena
- 2025–26: Primera Regional – Group 2, 7th of 18
- Website: www.xn--cdsariena-q6a.es
Home colours	Away colours

Club Deportivo Sariñena was a Spanish football team based in Sariñena, in the autonomous community of Aragon. Founded in 1945 and dissolved in 2026, it last played in Primera Regional – Group 2, holding home games at Estadio El Carmen, with a 4,500-seat capacity.

== History ==
=== Club background ===
- Club Deportivo Sariñena Educación y Descanso (1945–1954)
- Club de Fútbol Sariñena (1954–1958; 1966–1968)
- Club de Fútbol Nivelcampo (1958–1960)
- Club Deportivo Sariñena (1968–2026)

== Season to season ==
Season	Tier	Division	Place	Copa del Rey
1946–47	7	3ª Reg.	3rd	
1947–48	4	1ª Reg.	8th	
1948–49	4	1ª Reg.	5th	
1949–1954	DNP			
1954–55	5	2ª Reg.	3rd	
1955–56	4	1ª Reg.	11th	
1956–57	4	1ª Reg.	8th	
1957–58	DNP			
1958–59	4	1ª Reg.	13th	
1959–60	4	1ª Reg.	8th	
1960–1966	DNP			
1966–67	4	1ª Reg.	13th	
1967–68	4	1ª Reg.	5th	
1968–69	4	Reg. Pref.	10th	
1969–70	4	Reg. Pref.	14th	
1970–71	5	1ª Reg.	9th	
1971–72	5	1ª Reg.	4th	
1972–73	4	Reg. Pref.	16th	
1973–74	4	Reg. Pref.	10th	
1974–75	4	Reg. Pref.	14th	

Season	Tier	Division	Place	Copa del Rey
1975–76	4	Reg. Pref.	4th	
1976–77	4	Reg. Pref.	3rd	
1977–78	4	3ª	18th	
1978–79	5	Reg. Pref.	5th	
1979–80	5	Reg. Pref.	8th	
1980–81	5	Reg. Pref.	7th	
1981–82	5	Reg. Pref.	11th	
1982–83	5	Reg. Pref.	4th	
1983–84	5	Reg. Pref.	8th	
1984–85	5	Reg. Pref.	5th	
1985–86	5	Reg. Pref.	5th	
1986–87	4	3ª	13th	
1987–88	4	3ª	9th	
1988–89	4	3ª	2nd	
1989–90	4	3ª	5th	
1990–91	4	3ª	16th	
1991–92	4	3ª	11th	
1992–93	4	3ª	14th	
1993–94	4	3ª	11th	
1994–95	4	3ª	6th	

Season	Tier	Division	Place	Copa del Rey
1995–96	4	3ª	7th	
1996–97	4	3ª	6th	
1997–98	4	3ª	8th	
1998–99	4	3ª	11th	
1999–2000	4	3ª	16th	
2000–01	4	3ª	14th	
2001–02	4	3ª	11th	
2002–03	4	3ª	8th	
2003–04	4	3ª	10th	
2004–05	4	3ª	4th	
2005–06	4	3ª	7th	
2006–07	4	3ª	12th	
2007–08	4	3ª	8th	
2008–09	4	3ª	8th	
2009–10	4	3ª	12th	
2010–11	4	3ª	15th	

Season	Tier	Division	Place	Copa del Rey
2011–12	4	3ª	2nd	
2012–13	4	3ª	1st	
2013–14	3	2ª B	20th	Second round
2014–15	4	3ª	3rd	
2015–16	4	3ª	5th	
2016–17	4	3ª	16th	
2017–18	4	3ª	12th	
2018–19	4	3ª	4th	
2019–20	4	3ª	9th	
2020–21	4	3ª	7th / 5th	
2021–22	6	Reg. Pref.	2nd	
2022–23	6	Reg. Pref.	6th	
2023–24	6	Reg. Pref.	8th	
2024–25	6	Reg. Pref.	17th	
2025–26	7	1ª Reg.	7th	

- 1 season in Segunda División B
- 35 seasons in Tercera División

== Honours ==
- Tercera División: 2012–13
