= Iván Ania =

Spanish footballer

Personal information
- Full name: Iván Ania Cadavieco
- Date of birth: 24 October 1977 (age 49)
- Place of birth: Oviedo, Spain
- Height: 1.77 m (5 ft 9 1/2 in)
- Position: Winger

Team information
- Current team: Córdoba (manager)

Youth career
- 1982–1989: Juventud Asturiana
- 1989–1994: Oviedo

Senior career*
| Years | Team | Apps | (Gls) |
| 1994–1997 | Oviedo B | 23 | (2) |
| 1995–2001 | Oviedo | 162 | (14) |
| 2001–2004 | Tenerife | 51 | (8) |
| 2004 | → Rayo Vallecano (loan) | 12 | (0) |
| 2004–2005 | Gimnàstic | 35 | (3) |
| 2005–2006 | Cádiz | 9 | (0) |
| 2006–2007 | Lorca Deportiva | 12 | (2) |
| 2008–2009 | Covadonga | 26 | (6) |
| 2009–2010 | Oviedo | 23 | (1) |
| Total | | 353 | (36) |

International career
| 1992–1993 | Spain U16 | 11 | (2) |
| 1994–1996 | Spain U18 | 10 | (3) |
| 1995 | Spain U19 | 2 | (0) |
| 1997 | Spain U20 | 5 | (1) |
| 1998–2000 | Spain U21 | 7 | (1) |
| 2000–2002 | Asturias | 3 | (0) |

Managerial career
- 2011–2013: Covadonga
- 2013–2015: Oviedo B
- 2015–2017: Caudal
- 2017–2018: Villanovense
- 2018–2019: Racing Santander
- 2021–2023: Algeciras
- 2023–: Córdoba
- * Club domestic league appearances and goals

Iván Ania Cadavieco (born 24 October 1977) is a Spanish former professional footballer who played mainly as a left winger. He is currently manager of Segunda División club Córdoba.

He spent most of his career with Real Oviedo, totalling 201 appearances and scoring 16 goals. In La Liga, where he also represented Tenerife and Cádiz, he played 193 games and scored 15 times.

Ania started working as a coach in 2011.

== Playing career ==
Born in Oviedo, Asturias, Ania was a youth product of his hometown club Real Oviedo. After starting out as a senior with the reserves, he made his first-team – and La Liga – debut on 11 June 1995, coming on as a late substitute for scorer Oli in a 1–0 home win against Sporting de Gijón.

Ania scored his first professional goal on 8 November 1995, equalising an eventual 4–1 home victory over Osasuna in the second round of the Copa del Rey. He was definitely promoted to the main squad ahead of the 1997–98 season, previously netting for the first time in league on 12 May 1996 in the 4–0 away defeat of Deportivo de La Coruña.

Ania scored a career-best five goals in the 2000–01 campaign, but Oviedo were relegated as third-bottom. On 17 September 2001, he signed a four-year contract with Tenerife in the top division, for a fee of 400 million pesetas. He suffered another relegation in his first year, and spent the first half of 2003–04 unemployed before joining Rayo Vallecano on loan.

On 30 June 2005, following a one-year spell at fellow second-division Gimnàstic de Tarragona, Ania moved to Cádiz in a return to the top flight, but featured rarely as they went down. He joined Lorca Deportiva in summer 2006, also dropping down a level while only making five starts in the second tier.

In October 2008, after more than a year without a club, Ania signed for Tercera División side Covadonga. He returned to Oviedo on 28 June 2009, with the club now in the Segunda División B, and retired in 2010 aged 32.

Ania won the 1995 UEFA European Under-18 Championship with Spain, being an unused squad member. He was also selected for the 1997 FIFA World Youth Championship, making four appearances in Malaysia for the quarter-finalists.

== Coaching career ==
After retiring, Ania played in the Liga de Fútbol Indoor with Oviedo before being appointed manager of Covadonga on 8 December 2011. He left on 21 June 2013, and returned to the former on 18 November at the helm of the B team.

Ania took over Caudal on 11 June 2015, achieving promotion to the third tier in his first year. He left in May 2017, becoming head coach of Villanovense the following month.

On 17 May 2018, after narrowly missing out a play-off spot, Ania left Villanovense and was appointed at Racing de Santander also in the third division. He led the club to promotion at the end of the season, but was dismissed on 11 November 2019.

On 21 June 2021, Ania joined Algeciras of Primera División RFEF, signing a four-year contract. He departed on 27 June 2023, and took over Córdoba the following day. In his debut campaign in charge, he returned the Andalusians to the professional leagues after five years; his last experience there had also been in 2019, with Racing.

== Managerial statistics ==
As of 22 November 2026

Managerial record by team and tenure
| Team | Nat | From | To | Record | | | | | | | | Ref |
| Team | Nat | From | To | G | W | D | L | GF | GA | GD | Win % | Ref |
|---|---|---|---|---|---|---|---|---|---|---|---|---|
| Covadonga | (Spain) | 8 December 2011 | 21 June 2013 | 64 | 32 | 15 | 17 | 101 | 68 | +33 | 50.00 | |
| Oviedo B | (Spain) | 18 November 2013 | 11 June 2015 | 68 | 34 | 15 | 19 | 123 | 76 | +47 | 50.00 | |
| Caudal | (Spain) | 11 June 2015 | 22 May 2017 | 91 | 53 | 18 | 20 | 159 | 78 | +81 | 58.24 | |
| Villanovense | (Spain) | 25 June 2017 | 17 May 2018 | 43 | 16 | 13 | 14 | 39 | 41 | −2 | 37.21 | |
| Racing Santander | (Spain) | 17 May 2018 | 11 November 2019 | 62 | 26 | 24 | 12 | 88 | 53 | +35 | 41.94 | |
| Algeciras | (Spain) | 21 June 2021 | 27 June 2023 | 77 | 27 | 22 | 28 | 87 | 88 | −1 | 35.06 | |
| Córdoba | (Spain) | 28 June 2023 | Present | 144 | 64 | 35 | 45 | 217 | 190 | +27 | 44.44 | |
| Career total | | | | 549 | 252 | 142 | 155 | 814 | 594 | +220 | 45.90 | — |

== Honours ==
Spain U18

- UEFA European Under-18 Championship: 1995
