= 2026–27 CE Sabadell FC season =

Sabadell
2026–27 season
- Owner: Adam Rothstein
- President: Pau Morilla-Giner
- Head coach: Ferran Costa
- Stadium: Nova Creu Alta
- Segunda División: Ongoing
- Copa del Rey: Ongoing
- Copa Catalunya: Ongoing
Home colours	Away colours

The 2026–27 season is Centre d'Esports Sabadell Futbol Club's 124th season in existence and the club's first season back in the second division of Spanish football. In addition to the domestic league, Sabadell is involved in that season's editions of the Copa del Rey and Copa Catalunya. The season covers the period from 8 July 2026 to 30 June 2027.

This is the second season with manager Ferran Costa at the helm. After promotion, he signed a new deal until 2028.

The 2025-26 Copa Catalunya final was played on 2 September 2026, already in the 2026–27 campaign. The goalscorers of that game, Nicholas Gioacchini and Yanis Rahmani, were not Sabadell players in the 2025–26 season.

== Players ==
=== First-team squad ===
As of 26 October 2026

Note: Flags indicate national team as defined under FIFA eligibility rules; some limited exceptions apply. Players may hold more than one non-FIFA nationality.

No.	Pos.	Nation	Player
1	GK	ESP	Diego Fuoli
2	DF	ESP	Pipa
3	DF	ESP	Genar Fornés
4	DF	ESP	Miki Codina
5	MF	BRA	Arthur Bonaldo
6	DF	ESP	Edgar González (on loan from Almería)
7	FW	ESP	Ton Ripoll
8	MF	ESP	Pere Pons
9	FW	RUS	Nikolay Obolskiy
10	FW	ESP	Ángel Baena
11	FW	ESP	Javi López-Pinto
12	FW	URU	Gastón Valles
13	GK	ESP	José Ortega
14	MF	ESP	Óscar Sanz
15	DF	ESP	Kaiser

No.	Pos.	Nation	Player
16	FW	USA	Nicholas Gioacchini
18	MF	GHA	Yussif Owusu
19	FW	FRA	Yanis Rahmani
20	MF	ESP	Urri (captain)
21	MF	ESP	Alain Ribeiro
22	MF	NGR	Quadri Liameed
23	MF	ESP	Joel Priego
24	MF	ESP	Eneko Aguilar
25	GK	ESP	Marc Vidal
27	DF	ESP	José Luis Catalá
29	MF	ITA	Patrick Nuamah (on loan from Sassuolo)
30	MF	ESP	Xavi Moreno

=== Youth players ===
Note: Flags indicate national team as defined under FIFA eligibility rules; some limited exceptions apply. Players may hold more than one non-FIFA nationality.

No.	Pos.	Nation	Player
31	GK	ESP	Manel Estévez
33	FW	ESP	Quim Utgés

=== Out on loan ===
Note: Flags indicate national team as defined under FIFA eligibility rules; some limited exceptions apply. Players may hold more than one non-FIFA nationality.

No.	Pos.	Nation	Player
—	FW	ESP	Miguelete (at UD Logroñés until 30 June 2027)

== Competitions ==
=== Overall record ===
Competition	First match	Last match	Starting round	Record							
Competition	First match	Last match	Starting round	Pld	W	D	L	GF	GA	GD	Win %
Segunda División	6 June 2026	24 May 2027	Matchday 1	14	4	6	4	12	13	−1	28.57
Copa del Rey	28 October 2026		First round	0	0	0	0	0	0	+0	—
2025–26 Copa Catalunya	2 September 2026	2 September 2026	Final	1	1	0	0	2	1	+1	100.00
2026–27 Copa Catalunya			Sixth round	0	0	0	0	0	0	+0	—
Total				15	5	6	4	14	14	+0	33.33

Last updated: 15 November 2026
Source: BeSoccer

=== Segunda División ===
==== League table ====
Pos	Team	Pld	W	D	L	GF	GA	GD	Pts
11	Las Palmas	14	6	2	6	19	22	−3	20
12	Valladolid	14	5	3	6	22	21	+1	18
13	Sabadell	14	4	6	4	12	13	−1	18
14	Tenerife	13	4	6	3	17	17	0	18
15	Eldense	14	5	2	7	15	19	−4	17

Updated to match(es) played on 15 November 2026. Source: LaLiga Hypermotion
Rules for classification: 1) Points; 2) Head-to-head points; 3) Head-to-head goal difference; 4) Goal difference; 5) Goals scored; 6) Fair-play points
(Note: Head-to-head record is used only after all the matches between the teams in question have been played)

==== Results summary ====
Overall								Home						Away					
Pld	W	D	L	GF	GA	GD	Pts	W	D	L	GF	GA	GD	W	D	L	GF	GA	GD
14	4	6	4	12	13	−1	18	3	3	0	8	4	+4	1	3	4	4	9	−5

Last updated: 15 Nov 2026.

==== Results by round ====
Round	1	2	3	4	5	6	7	8	9	10	11	12	13	14	15
Ground	A	A	H	H	A	H	A	H	A	A	H	A	H	A	
Result	D	D	W	W	L	W	D	D	W	L	D	L	D	L	
Position	14	16	9	3	11	6	7	7	5	10	10	10	13	14	

Updated to match(es) played on 15 November 2026. Source: RFEF
A = Away; H = Home; W = Win; D = Draw; L = Loss; P = Postponed

== Statistics ==
=== Goal scorers ===
As of match played 15 November 2026

Rank	No.	Pos.	Player	Segunda División	Copa del Rey	Copa Catalunya	Total
1	16	FW	(United States) Nicholas Gioacchini	3	0	1	4
2	10	MF	(Spain) Ángel Baena	3	0	0	3
3	14	DF	(Spain) Óscar Sanz	2	0	0	2
4	20	MF	(Spain) Urri	1	0	0	1
4	6	DF	(Spain) Edgar González	1	0	0	1
4	12	FW	(Uruguay) Gastón Valles	1	0	0	1
4	24	MF	(Spain) Eneko Aguilar	1	0	0	1
4	19	FW	(France) Yanis Rahmani	0	0	1	1
Own goals				0	0	0	0
Totals				12	0	2	14

=== Clean sheets ===
As of match played 15 November 2026

Rank	No.	Pos.	Player	Segunda División	Copa del Rey	Copa Catalunya	Total
1	1	GK	(Spain) Diego Fuoli	5	0	0	5
Totals				5	0	0	5
