= 2025–26 CE Sabadell FC season =

Sabadell
2025–26 season
- Owner: Adam Rothstein
- President: Pau Morilla-Giner
- Head coach: Ferran Costa
- Stadium: Nova Creu Alta
- Primera Federación: 2nd - Promoted
- Copa del Rey: Second Round
- Copa Catalunya: Winner
Home colours	Away colours

The 2025–26 season was Centre d'Esports Sabadell Futbol Club's 123rd season in existence and the club's first season back in the third division of Spanish football. In addition to the domestic league, Sabadell was involved in that season's editions of the Copa del Rey and Copa Catalunya. The season covered the period from 16 July 2025 to 30 June 2026 and finished with a promotion back to the second tier of Spanish football.

This was the first season with manager Ferran Costa at the helm, having joined the club on 23 June 2025, signing a two-year contract. He was the third manager in the XXI century to lead the team to Segunda División after Lluís Carreras in 2011 and Antonio Hidalgo in 2020.

Promotion was achieved in the 2026 Primera Federación play-offs after the team finished the regular season in second place behind champions Eldense.

In the 2025-26 Copa del Rey, the team was knocked out in the second round by a Deportivo de A Coruña managed by former Sabadell player and coach Antonio Hidalgo.

Sabadell added a trophy to its successful campaign winning the 2025-26 Copa Catalunya. The final against Barcelona Atlètic was played on 2 September 2026, already in the 2026-27 campaign. The goalscorers of that game, Nicholas Gioacchini and Yanis Rahmani were not Sabadell players in the 2025-26 season.

== Players ==
=== First-team squad ===
As of 22 February 2026.

Note: Flags indicate national team as defined under FIFA eligibility rules; some limited exceptions apply. Players may hold more than one non-FIFA nationality.

No.	Pos.	Nation	Player
1	GK	ESP	Diego Fuoli
2	DF	ESP	Carlos Alemán
3	DF	ESP	Genar Fornés
4	DF	ESP	Carlos García-Die
5	MF	BRA	Arthur Bonaldo
6	MF	ESP	Jan Molina
7	FW	ESP	Ton Ripoll
8	MF	ESP	Xavi Moreno
9	FW	ESP	Rodrigo Escudero
10	FW	ESP	Miguelete
11	FW	ESP	Rubén Martínez
13	GK	ESP	José Ortega
14	DF	ESP	David Astals (on loan from Ibiza)

No.	Pos.	Nation	Player
15	DF	ESP	Kaiser (footballer)
16	FW	ESP	Alan Godoy
17	FW	ARG	Agustín Coscia
18	FW	ESP	Jordi Ortega
19	FW	ESP	Javi López-Pinto
20	MF	ESP	Urri
21	DF	ESP	Sergi Segura
22	MF	NGR	Quadri Liameed
23	MF	ESP	Joel Priego
24	MF	ESP	Eneko Aguilar
25	GK	ESP	Nil Ruiz
26	MF	ESP	Tito Tolosa
31	DF	ESP	Alonso Zamora
34	FW	ESP	Fran Rivera

== Competitions ==
=== Overall record ===
Competition	First match	Last match	Starting round	Record							
Competition	First match	Last match	Starting round	Pld	W	D	L	GF	GA	GD	Win %
Primera Federación	30 August 2025	24 May 2026	Matchday 1	42	20	14	8	60	30	+30	47.62
Copa del Rey	29 October 2025	4 December 2025	First round	2	1	0	1	2	3	−1	50.00
Copa Catalunya	19 November 2025		Sixth round	4	1	3	0	7	6	+1	25.00
Total				48	22	17	9	69	39	+30	45.83

Last updated: 19 June 2026
Source: BeSoccer

=== Primera Federación ===
==== League table ====
Pos	Team	Pld	W	D	L	GF	GA	GD	Pts	Qualification
1	Eldense (C, P)	38	19	12	7	57	39	+18	69	Promotion to Segunda División and qualification for the Copa del Rey
2	Sabadell (O, P)	38	18	14	6	53	27	+26	68	Qualification for the promotion play-offs and Copa del Rey
3	Atlético Madrileño	38	19	10	9	64	44	+20	67	Qualification for the promotion play-offs
4	Villarreal B	38	16	15	7	54	32	+22	63	Qualification for the promotion play-offs
5	Europa	38	16	12	10	55	50	+5	60	Qualification for the promotion play-offs and Copa del Rey

Updated to match(es) played on 24 May 2026. Source: RFEF
Rules for classification: 1) points; 2) head-to-head points; 3) head-to-head goal difference; 4) goal difference; 5) number of goals scored
(Note: Head-to-head record is used only after all the matches between the teams in question have been played)
(C) Champions; (O) Play-off winners; (P) Promoted

==== Results summary ====
Overall								Home						Away					
Pld	W	D	L	GF	GA	GD	Pts	W	D	L	GF	GA	GD	W	D	L	GF	GA	GD
42	20	14	8	60	30	+30	74	11	8	2	33	9	+24	9	6	6	27	21	+6

Last updated: 19 June 2026.
Source: RFEF

==== Results by round ====
Round	1	2	3	4	5	6	7	8	9	10	11	12	13	14	15	16	17	18	19	20	21	22	23	24	25	26	27	28	29	30	31	32	33	34	35	36	37	38
Ground	H	A	H	A	H	A	H	A	H	A	H	A	H	A	H	A	H	A	H	A	H	H	A	A	H	A	H	A	H	A	H	A	H	A	H	A	H	
Result	D	D	D	W	W	D	D	W	D	D	D	W	W	L	W	W	W	W	W	W	D	D	L	L	W	D	W	D	W	D	L	W	W	W	D	L	L	
Position	12	14	13	7	2	6	5	3	4	4	5	3	2	3	2	3	2	1	1	1	1	1	1	1	1	1	1	1	1	1	2	2	2	1	2	2	2	

Updated to match(es) played on 16 May 2026. Source: RFEF
A = Away; H = Home; W = Win; D = Draw; L = Loss; P = Postponed

=== Copa del Rey ===
29 October 2025 First round	Poblense	1–2 (a.e.t.)	Sabadell	Sa Pobla
18:00 CET (UTC+1)	Dieguito 32' (pen.)	Report	Rubén Martínez 11' (pen.); López-Pinto 109'	Stadium: Nou Camp; Referee: Álvaro Cánovas García Villarrubia

4 December 2025 Second round	Sabadell	0-2	Deportivo La Coruña	Sabadell
19:00 CET (UTC+1)		Report	Cristian Herrera 54'; Rubén López 80'	Stadium: Nova Creu Alta; Referee: Alonso De Ena Wolf

=== Copa Catalunya ===
19 November 2025 Sixth round	Ripollet	2-3	Sabadell	Ripollet
20:00 CET (UTC+1)	Rubén López 57'; Isaac Collado 82'	Report	Sergio Cortés 24'; Rubén Martínez 31' (pen.); Tito Tolosa 42'	Stadium: Camp de Futbol ZEM de Ripollet

10 December 2025 Seventh round	UE Cornellà	1-1 (0-3 p)	Sabadell	Cornellà de Llobregat
21:00 CET (UTC+1)	Joan Benet 71'	Report	Utgés 88'	Stadium: Camp de Futbol Municipal de Cornellà de Llobregat

14 January 2026 Quarter finals	Terrassa FC	2-2 (3-4 p)	Sabadell	Terrassa
20:00 CET (UTC+1)	Mario Domingo 26'; van den Heerik 43'	Report	Jordi Ortega 61'; Godoy 89'	Stadium: Estadi Olímpic de Terrassa

18 February 2026 Semifinals	Sabadell	1-1 (5-4 p)	Gimnàstic de Tarragona	Sabadell
19:00 CET (UTC+1)	Kaiser 66'	Report	Pau Raya 78'	Stadium: Nova Creu Alta

== Statistics ==
=== Goal scorers ===
As of match played 19 June 2026

Rank	No.	Pos.	Player	Primera Federación	Copa del Rey	Copa Catalunya	Total
1	19	MF	(Spain) Javi López-Pinto	10	1	0	11
2	17	FW	(Argentina) Agustín Coscia	10	0	0	10
3	9	FW	(Spain) Rodrigo Escudero	9	0	0	9
4	23	MF	(Spain) Joel Priego	7	0	0	7
5	11	MF	(Spain) Rubén Martínez	3	1	1	5
6	10	FW	(Spain) Miguelete	4	0	0	4
7	8	MF	(Spain) Sergio Cortés	2	0	1	3
7	5	DF	(Brazil) Arthur Bonaldo	3	0	0	3
9	29	FW	(Spain) Quim Utgés	1	0	1	2
9	3	DF	(Spain) Genar Fornés	2	0	0	2
9	16	FW	(Spain) Alan Godoy	1	0	1	2
9	14	DF	(Spain) David Astals	2	0	0	2
9	24	MF	(Spain) Eneko Aguilar	2	0	0	2
9	22	MF	(Nigeria) Quadri Liameed	2	0	0	2
15	26	MF	(Spain) Tito Tolosa	0	0	1	1
15	18	MF	(Spain) Jordi Ortega	0	0	1	1
15	15	DF	(Spain) Kaiser	0	0	1	1
15	8	MF	(Spain) Xavi Moreno	1	0	0	1
Own goals				1	0	0	1
Totals				60	2	7	69

=== Clean sheets ===
As of match played 19 June 2026

Rank	No.	Pos.	Player	Primera Federación	Copa del Rey	Copa Catalunya	Total
1	1	GK	(Spain) Diego Fuoli	23	0	0	23
2	13	GK	(Spain) José Ortega	1	0	0	1
Totals				24	0	0	24
