= 2025–26 Copa Catalunya =

Catalonia Cup

Final positions
- Champions: CE Sabadell
- Runners-up: Barcelona Atlètic

The 2025–26 Copa Catalunya was the 35th staging of the Copa Catalunya and was won by CE Sabadell. The competition began on 30 August 2025 and finished on 2 September 2026. It was played by teams in Primera RFEF, Segunda RFEF, Tercera RFEF and the top teams of Lliga Elit, Primera Catalana, Segona Catalana, Tercera Catalana and Quarta Catalana. After being included in the last edition, first teams of FC Barcelona, Girona FC and RCD Espanyol did not take part in the competition and were replaced by their reserve teams. That meant that Girona was not able to defend the title won against Espanyol in the previous final.

== First round ==
Games were played on 23 and 24 August 2025. This round featured winners of the territorial amateur cups and teams from the lower regional divisions.

Team 1	Score	Team 2
NSA Camp Joliu	3–1	CF Morell
CF Cardona	2–1	UE Berga
CF Unificación Llefià	1–0	CE Júpiter
UE Porqueres	2–0	FC L'Escala B
CE APA Poble Sec	3–2	CD Almeda
CF Ciudad Cooperativa	2–1	FC Santboià
CF Ripollet	2–0	UE Sabadellenca
UE San Juan Atlético de Montcada	1–0	CF Singuerlín

== Second round ==
Games were played on 6 and 7 September 2025. Teams from Lliga Elit (sixth tier) entered in this round.

Team 1	Score	Team 2
NSA Camp Joliu	1–0	UE Valls
CF Cardona	1–1 (4–2 p)	CE Artesa de Segre
UE Vic	2–0	AEC Manlleu
FC Martinenc	3–0	UA Horta
CF Unificación Llefià	2–1	CF Lloreda
UE San Juan Atlético de Montcada	1–0	EE Guineueta
CF Ripollet	3–2	CE Sabadell B
UE Porqueres	1–0	Palamós CF

== Third round ==
Games were played on 20 and 21 September 2025. The winners of this round qualified for the Fourth Round, where they joined other regional qualifiers. FC Martinenc and UE Vic received a bye to the next round.

Team 1	Score	Team 2
NSA Camp Joliu	2–0	CF Canonja
CF Cardona	1–0	UE Castellar
CF Ciudad Cooperativa	2–2 (5–4 p)	Santfeliuenc FC
UE San Juan Atlético de Montcada	2–1	CP Sarrià
CF Ripollet	1–0	UE Canovelles
CE APA Poble Sec	1–0	FC Vilafranca

== Fourth round ==
Only four games were played in this round, all of them split between 8 and 15 October 2025. The other two winners of Third Round, FC Martinenc and UE Vic, received a bye.

Team 1	Score	Team 2
NSA Camp Joliu	2-1	CF Ciudad Cooperativa
CF Cardona	3-0	UE San Juan Atlético de Montcada
CE APA Poble Sec	2-3	CF Unificación Llefià
UE Porqueres	1-4	CF Ripollet

== Fifth round ==
Teams that played in the Catalan group of 2024-25 Tercera Federación entered this round, with the exception of champions Reus FC Reddis, who received a bye. Games were played between 29 October and 5 November 2025. As the champions Girona FC will not play this year's competition, their reserve team Girona FC B, who entered in this round, tried to defend the title for the club, but was eventually eliminated.

Team 1	Score	Team 2
CF Unificación Llefià	1-2	CF Badalona
CF Ripollet	2-2 (7–6 p)	Cerdanyola del Vallès FC
NSA Camp Joliu	2-0	AE Prat
CF Cardona	2-0	CE Manresa
UE Vic	4-1	UE Tona
FC Martinenc	1-4	CF Montañesa
CFJ Mollerussa	3-2	CE Atlètic Lleida
CP San Cristóbal	2-1	CE L'Hospitalet
FC L'Escala	1-3	CF Peralada
FE Grama	3-0	Girona FC B

== Sixth round ==
Teams that played in the group 3 of 2024-25 Segunda Federación entered this round, with the exception of champions CE Europa, who received a bye. Games were played between 19 and 26 November 2025. NSA Camp Joliu, CF Cardona and CF Ripollet, all of them from Primera Catalana, were the lowest-ranked teams surviving in the competition.

Team 1	Score	Team 2
CF Montañesa	3-1	CF Badalona
CF Ripollet	2-3	CE Sabadell
NSA Camp Joliu	0-0 (4-3 p)	Reus FC Reddis
CF Cardona	1-5	Terrassa FC
UE Vic	1-1 (1–2 p)	UE Sant Andreu
CFJ Mollerussa	2-3	Lleida CF
CP San Cristóbal	0-1	UE Cornellà
CF Peralada	1-0	UE Olot
FE Grama	1-0	RCD Espanyol B

== Seventh round ==
The nine winners of the previous round and CE Europa entered this round. Games were played between 10 and 16 December 2025. NSA Camp Joliu, from Primera Catalana, was the lowest-ranked team surviving in the competition.

Team 1	Score	Team 2
FE Grama	0-2	Terrassa FC
NSA Camp Joliu	1-0	Lleida CF
CF Montañesa	1-0	UE Sant Andreu
UE Cornellà	1-1 (0-3 p)	CE Sabadell
CF Peralada	0-2	CE Europa

== Quarter-Finals ==
The five winners of the previous round and the three teams which played in 2024-25 Primera Federación (Nàstic de Tarragona, Andorra and Barcelona Atlètic) entered this round. Games were played on 14 January 2026. NSA Camp Joliu, from Primera Catalana, was the lowest-ranked team surviving in the competition.

Team 1	Score	Team 2
NSA Camp Joliu	1-2	Barcelona Atlètic
CF Montañesa	2-2 (2-4 p)	Nàstic de Tarragona
Terrassa FC	2-2 (3-4 p)	CE Sabadell
CE Europa	2-3	FC Andorra

== Semi-Finals ==
Games will be played on 17 and 18 February 2026.

Team 1	Score	Team 2
Barcelona Atlètic	2-1	FC Andorra
CE Sabadell	1-1 (5-4 p)	Nàstic de Tarragona

== Final ==
Barcelona Atlètic and CE Sabadell met at the final for the second time ten years after the Arlequinats won the 2015-16 Copa Catalunya defeating FC Barcelona reserve team. As it was not possible to find a date in the last months of the 2025-26 season, the final was played on 2 September 2026 in the Nova Creu Alta stadium in Sabadell. Sabadell won its second title after defeating Barcelona Atlètic 2-1 thanks to goals from Nicholas Gioacchini and Yanis Rahmani, two players that were not in the club in the 2025-26 season but could play as the delayed date allowed new signings to feature.

2 October 2026
20:30

Barcelona Atlètic	1-2	Sabadell
Gariba 55'	Report	Gioacchini 3'; Rahmani 86'

Nova Creu Alta, Sabadell
Referee: Marc Oltra Sáez

Barcelona Atlètic:
1	(Spain) Iker Rodríguez
2	(Spain) Landry Farré
3	(Ghana) Hafiz Gariba		(substituted off) 79'
4	(Spain) Alex Campos
5	(Ecuador) Josué Caicedo	(yellow card) 63'	(substituted off) 65'
6	(Spain) Pedro Villar
7	(Belgium) Jesse Bisiwu		(substituted off) 12'
8	(Spain) Juan Ybarra		(substituted off) 65'
9	(Spain) Ignasi Quer		(substituted off) 65'
10	(Israel) Orian Goren
11	(Ghana) Aziz Issah		(substituted off) 65'
Substitutes:
12	(Spain) Guillem Víctor		(substituted on) 79'
13	(Spain) Max Bonfill
14	(Spain) Javi Castro
15	(Spain) Jordi Pesquer		(substituted on) 65'
16	(Spain) Adam Argemí		(substituted on) 65'
17	(Netherlands) Shane Kluivert		(substituted on) 12'
18	(Spain) Joni Hernández
19	(Spain) Òscar Gistau		(substituted on) 65'
20	(Spain) Álex González		(substituted on) 65'
Manager:
(Brazil) Juliano Belletti

Sabadell:
1	(Spain) Diego Fuoli
2	(Spain) Pipa		(substituted off) 68'
4	(Spain) Miki Codina	(yellow card) 21'
6	(Spain) Edgar González
14	(Spain) Óscar Sanz	(yellow card) 44'	(substituted off) 46'
16	(United States) Nicholas Gioacchini		(substituted off) 56'
20	(Spain) Urri
22	(Nigeria) Quadri Liameed		(substituted off) 46'
23	(Spain) Joel Priego		(substituted off) 56'
24	(Spain) Eneko Aguilar	(yellow card) 34'	(substituted off) 68'
27	(Spain) José Luis Catalá
Substitutes:
7	(Spain) Ton Ripoll		(substituted on) 46'
8	(Spain) Pere Pons		(substituted on) 46'
9	(Russia) Nikolai Obolskii		(substituted on) 68'
10	(Spain) Ángel Baena
12	(Uruguay) Gastón Valles		(substituted on) 56'
13	(Spain) José Ortega
15	(Spain) Kaiser
19	(France) Yanis Rahmani		(substituted on) 56'
30	(Spain) Xavi Moreno		(substituted on) 68'
Manager:
(Spain) Ferran Costa
