= Vallès derby =

Football rivalry in Catalonia, Spain

Derbi del Vallès
- Other names: El derVi
- Location: Vallès Occidental, Catalonia, Spain
- Teams: Sabadell; Terrassa
- First meeting: 7 May 1911; Friendly; Terrassa 0-9 Sabadell
- Latest meeting: 14 January 2026; 2025-26 Copa Catalunya; Terrassa 2-2 Sabadell (3-4 pens)
- Next meeting: Unknown

Statistics
- Largest victory: Terrassa 0-9 Sabadell; 7 May 1911; Friendly

The Vallès Derby is the name given to football matches between CE Sabadell and Terrassa FC. Both clubs are located in the comarca of Vallès Occidental, one of the most populated of Catalonia. Sabadell and Terrassa are the two capitals of the comarca and have been fierce rivals since the Industrial Revolution.

As Terrassa never competed in the first division, the highest tier in which the derby has been played is Segunda División. Of the twenty games contested in the second division, fourteen were played between 1954 and 1961. The first two had been played before, in 1942, and the remaining four were played between 1977 and 1979. From August 2011 to December 2024, there were no meetings between the two sides, as Sabadell was all that time in a higher division. The long wait was over after Sabadell was relegated to the fourth tier and on 8 December 2024 it was played again: a 0–0 draw in the Nova Creu Alta in front of a crowd of 9.000. Terrassa won their first derby since 2002 four months later, but Sabadell's promotion in May 2025 meant that this new era in the same division lasted only one season. The derby has never been played in the Copa del Rey.

== Matches summary ==
As of 20 August 2026

Competition	Matches	Wins		Draws	Goals		Home wins		Home draws		Away wins		Other venue wins	
Competition	Matches	SAB	TER	Draws	SAB	TER	SAB	TER	SAB	TER	SAB	TER	SAB	TER
Segunda División	20	9	5	6	28	21	6	3	2	4	3	2	0	0
Segunda División B	24	10	8	6	-	-	-	-	-	-	-	-	-	-
Segunda Federación	2	0	1	1	0	2	0	1	1	0	0	0	0	0
Tercera División	4	0	1	3	4	5	0	0	1	2	0	1	0	0
Copa Catalunya	8	3	2	3	-	-	-	-	-	-	-	-	-	-
Catalan football championship First Division	10	4	5	1	-	-	-	-	-	-	-	-	-	-
Catalan football championship Promotion-Relegation Play-Off	4	3	0	1	-	-	-	-	-	-	-	-	-	-
Catalan football championship Second Division	4	3	0	1	-	-	-	-	-	-	-	-	-	-
Torneig de Consolació	2	2	0	0	-	-	-	-	-	-	-	-	-	-
Lliga Comarcal	2	1	0	1	-	-	-	-	-	-	-	-	-	-
All competitions	80	35	23	22	-	-	-	-	-	-	-	-	-	-
Exhibition games	110	56	34	20	-	-	-	-	-	-	-	-	-	-
All matches	190	91	57	42	-	-	-	-	-	-	-	-	-	-

== See also ==
- Catalan football championship
- List of association football rivalries
- List of sports rivalries
