= Josep Antoni =

Josep Antoni is the name of:

- Josep Antoni Noya, Spanish footballer
- Josep Antoni Duran i Lleida, Spanish politician
- Josep Antoni Coderch, Spanish architect
- Josep Antoni Fernández i Fernández, Spanish comic book artist
