= 2026 Primera Federación play-offs =

The 2026 Primera Federación play-offs (Playoffs de Ascenso or Promoción de Ascenso) are the final play-offs for promotion from 2025–26 Primera Federación to the 2026–27 Segunda División.

== Format ==
Teams ranked second through fifth in each of the two groups qualified for the promotion play-off, which will determine the last two promotion spots. The eight qualified teams were drawn into two fixed brackets, each of which contained the second and fifth-place finishers from one group and the third and fourth-place finishers from the other. All ties consist of a two-legged knockout series. In case of draws, extra time will be played; if the match is still level following extra time, the team which achieved a higher regular season finish is proclaimed the winner.

Starting with the 2022–23 season, the RFEF revived the two-legged knockout system, due to the complaints filed against the single knockout system at a neutral venue that had been implemented after COVID-19 and the subsequent reform of the football leagues organized by the RFEF.

=== Bracket ===
Semi–finals (30–31 May and 6–7 June)
5B | Europa | 1 | 2 | 2
2A | Celta Fortuna (a.e.t.) | 1 | 3 | 4
4A | Ponferradina | 0 | 1 | 1
3B | Atlético Madrileño | 0 | 0 | 0

Finals (13 and 20 June)
2A | Celta Fortuna | 0 | 4 | 4
4A | Ponferradina | 0 | 1 | 1

Semi–finals (29–31 May and 5–7 June)
5A | Real Madrid Castilla | 2 | 0 | 2
2B | Sabadell | 0 | 3 | 3
4B | Villarreal B | 2 | 0 | 2
3A | Zamora (a.e.t.) | 0 | 2 | 2

Finals (13 and 19 June)
2B | Sabadell | 0 | 4 | 4
3A | Zamora | 1 | 0 | 1

=== First round ===
==== Qualified teams ====
| Group | Position | Team |
|---|---|---|
| 1 | 2nd | Celta Fortuna |
| 2 | 2nd | Sabadell |

| Group | Position | Team |
|---|---|---|
| 1 | 3rd | Zamora |
| 2 | 3rd | Atlético Madrileño |

| Group | Position | Team |
|---|---|---|
| 1 | 4th | Ponferradina |
| 2 | 4th | Villarreal B |

| Group | Position | Team |
|---|---|---|
| 1 | 5th | Real Madrid Castilla |
| 2 | 5th | Europa |

==== Matches ====
===== Semi–finals =====
| Team 1 | Agg. | Team 2 | 1st leg | 2nd leg |
|---|---|---|---|---|
| Europa | 3–4 | Celta Fortuna | 1–1 | 2–3 (a.e.t.) |
| Ponferradina | 1–0 | Atlético Madrileño | 0–0 | 1–0 |
| Real Madrid Castilla | 2–3 | Sabadell | 2–0 | 0–3 |
| Villarreal B | 2–2 | Zamora (seed) | 2–0 | 0–2 (a.e.t.) |

First leg

| 29 May 2026 | Real Madrid Castilla | 2−0 | Sabadell | Madrid |
| 21:00 UTC+2 | Fortuny 71'; Palacios 79' | Report | | Stadium: Estadio Alfredo Di Stefano; Referee: Olatz Rivera Olmedo |

| 30 May 2026 | Ponferradina | 0−0 | Atlético Madrileño | Ponferrada |
| 21:00 UTC+2 | | Report | | Stadium: Estadio El Toralín; Referee: Javier Figueiredo Comesaña |

| 31 May 2026 | Europa | 1–1 | Celta Fortuna | Barcelona |
| 16:15 UTC+2 | Cano 43' | Report | Antañón 90+8' | Stadium: Centre Esportiu Municipal Can Dragó; Referee: Juan Manuel Gordillo Escamilla |

| 31 May 2026 | Villarreal B | 2−0 | Zamora | Villarreal |
| 20:30 UTC+2 | Arguigue 11'; Gaitán 16' | Report | | Stadium: Ciudad Deportiva José Manuel Llaneza; Referee: Gerard Brull Acerete |

Second leg

| 5 June 2026 | Sabadell | 3−0 (3−2 agg.) | Real Madrid Castilla | Sabadell |
| 21:00 UTC+2 | Priego 30', 90'; Astals 32' | Report | | Stadium: Estadi de la Nova Creu Alta; Referee: Rubén Ruipérez Marín |

| 6 June 2026 | Atlético Madrileño | 0−1 (0−1 agg.) | Ponferradina | Alcalá de Henares |
| 18:30 UTC+2 | | Report | Keita 8' | Stadium: Centro Deportivo Alcalá de Henares; Referee: Gonzalo Romero Freixas |

| 7 June 2026 | Celta Fortuna | 3−2 (a.e.t.) (4−3 agg.) | Europa | Vigo |
| 16:15 UTC+2 | González 57', 73' (pen.); Arcos 107' | Report | Cano 28', 79' (pen.) | Stadium: Estadio de Balaídos; Referee: Daniel Miranda Bolaño |

| 7 June 2026 | Zamora | 2–0 (a.e.t.) (2–2 agg.) | Villarreal B | Zamora |
| 18:30 UTC+2 | Carlos Ramos 22', 90+8' (pen.) | Report | | Stadium: Estadio Ruta de la Plata; Referee: José Antonio Palomares Gutiérrez |

=== Second round ===
==== Qualified teams ====
| Group | Position | Team |
|---|---|---|
| 1 | 2nd | Celta Fortuna |
| 2 | 2nd | Sabadell |

| Group | Position | Team |
|---|---|---|
| 1 | 3rd | Zamora |

| Group | Position | Team |
|---|---|---|
| 1 | 4th | Ponferradina |

==== Matches ====
===== Finals =====
| Team 1 | Agg. | Team 2 | 1st leg | 2nd leg |
|---|---|---|---|---|
| Ponferradina | 1–4 | Celta Fortuna | 0–0 | 1–4 |
| Zamora | 1–4 | Sabadell | 1–0 | 0–4 |

First leg

| 13 June 2026 | Ponferradina | 0–0 | Celta Fortuna | Ponferrada |
| 18:30 UTC+2 | | Report | | Stadium: Estadio El Toralín; Referee: Abraham Domínguez Cervantes |

| 13 June 2026 | Zamora | 1–0 | Sabadell | Zamora |
| 21:00 UTC+2 | Losada 3' | Report | | Stadium: Estadio Ruta de la Plata; Referee: Alejandro Clemente Ortuño |

Second leg

| 19 June 2026 | Sabadell | 4–0 (4–1 agg.) | Zamora | Sabadell |
| 21:00 UTC+2 | López-Pinto 18'; Aguilar 89'; Liameed 90+5'; Moreno 90+19' | Report | | Stadium: Estadi de la Nova Creu Alta; Referee: Aimar Velasco Arbaiza |

| 20 June 2026 | Celta Fortuna | 4–1 (4–1 agg.) | Ponferradina | Vigo |
| 18:30 UTC+2 | González 23', 64'; Samouah 86'; Capdevila 90+5' | Report | Valle 43' | Stadium: Estadio de Balaídos; Referee: Pablo Morales Moreno |

== Promoted teams ==
- The two teams that were promoted to Segunda División through regular season groups and the two play–off winners are included.

Promoted to Segunda División
| Eldense (1 year later) | Tenerife (1 year later) | Sabadell (5 years later) | Celta Fortuna (First time ever) |
