= Rodrigo Escudero =

Spanish footballer (born 1994)

Personal information
- Full name: Rodrigo Escudero Vega
- Date of birth: 31 March 1995 (age 31)
- Place of birth: Valladolid, Spain
- Height: 1.81 m (5 ft 11 in)
- Position: Striker

Team information
- Current team: Extremadura
- Number: 9

Youth career
- 2010–2013: Villa de Simancas

Senior career*
Years	Team	Apps	(Gls)
2013–2015	Villa de Simancas	60	(17)
2015–2017	Palencia	63	(11)
2017–2019	Arandina	61	(20)
2019–2021	Zamora	42	(13)
2021–2022	Compostela	30	(7)
2022–2023	Talavera	36	(15)
2023–2024	Cultural Leonesa	34	(4)
2024–2025	Algeciras	33	(11)
2025–2026	Sabadell	34	(9)
2026–	Extremadura	2	(0)
- * Club domestic league appearances and goals as of 6 September 2026

Rodrigo Escudero Vega (born 31 March 1995), sometimes known as Rodri, is a Spanish professional footballer who plays as a striker for CD Extremadura.

== Career ==
Born in Valladolid, Castile and León, Escudero began his career with local side CD Villa de Simancas, helping in their promotion to Tercera División in 2014. In 2015, he moved to fellow league team CD Palencia Balompié, also helping in their promotion to Segunda División B in his first year.

In 2017, after suffering immediate relegation, Escudero agreed to a deal with Arandina CF in division four. On 17 July 2019, after missing out promotion twice in the play-offs, he moved to Zamora CF of the same category, and again finished his first season with promotion.

On 25 July 2021, Escudero signed a one-year contract with SD Compostela, in the newly-established Segunda División RFEF. Regularly used, he moved to Primera Federación side CF Talavera de la Reina roughly one year later, where he would score a career-best 15 goals during the campaign – which were still unable to prevent the club's relegation – including four goals in a 4–2 home win over Pontevedra CF on 7 May 2023.

On 15 July 2023, Escudero was announced at fellow third division side Cultural y Deportiva Leonesa on a one-year deal. Unable to repeat the same goalscoring form, he joined fellow league team Algeciras CF the following 1 July.

On 11 July 2025, after scoring 11 goals for Algeciras, Escudero moved to CE Sabadell FC still in division three. He contributed with nine goals in 40 appearances overall during the season, as the club achieved promotion to Segunda División.

On 20 August 2026, Escudero terminated his link with the Arquelinats, and signed for third division newcomers CD Extremadura just hours later.
