= 2026–27 Copa Catalunya =

Catalonia Cup

The 2026–27 Copa Catalunya is the 36th staging of the Copa Catalunya. The competition began on 29 August 2026 and will finish in 2027. As in the previous edition, it is played by teams that were involved the season before in Primera RFEF, Segunda RFEF, Tercera RFEF and the top teams of Lliga Elit, Primera Catalana, Segona Catalana, Tercera Catalana and Quarta Catalana. First teams of FC Barcelona, Girona FC, RCD Espanyol and FC Andorra don't take part in the competition. Holders CE Sabadell are included despite playing in Segunda División, as they were in Primera RFEF in the 2025-26 season. Rōnin, the club founded by Internet celebrity Ibai Llanos, appeared in the competition for the first time.

== First round ==
Games were played on 29 and 30 August 2026. This round featured winners of each group of 2025-26 Quarta Catalana and Tercera Catalana. Rōnin FC won its first ever Copa Catalunya game as they defeated Junior FC “B”.

== Fifth round ==
Teams that played in the Catalan group of 2026-27 Tercera Federación and champions of 2026-27 Lliga Elit, UE San Juan Atlético de Montcada, entered this round. Games were played between 28 October and 4 November 2026.

Team 1	Score	Team 2
FE Grama	0-1	CF Badalona
CF Vila-Seca	1-2	CFJ Mollerussa
UE Vic	0-1	UE Tona
FC L'Escala	0-1	CF Peralada
CF Montañesa	1-1 (1–4 p)	CE L'Hospitalet
FC Sporting Gavà	2-1	CF Vilanova i la Geltrú
UE Quart	1-1 (1–4 p)	UE Vilassar de Mar
UE San Juan Atlético de Montcada	1-2	Cerdanyola del Vallès FC
CF Can Vidalet	4-3	UE Cornellà
Rönin FC	1-1 (3–5 p)	CP San Cristóbal
CE Puig-Reig	0-3	CE Manresa
