= Yussif Owusu =

Footballer (born 2006)

Personal information
- Full name: Yussif Moro Owusu
- Date of birth: 14 February 2006 (age 20)
- Place of birth: Ghana
- Position: Midfielder

Team information
- Current team: Sabadell
- Number: 18

Youth career
- 2020–2022: Chelsea
- 2022–2026: Brighton & Hove Albion

Senior career*
Years	Team	Apps	(Gls)
2026–	Sabadell	2	(0)
- * Club domestic league appearances and goals as of 00:09, 16 November 2026 (UTC)

Yussif Moro Owusu (born 14 February 2006) is a Ghanaian professional footballer who plays as a midfielder for Segunda División club Sabadell.

== Career ==
Owusu arrived in England at the age of 14, and played for the youth categories of Chelsea before joining Brighton & Hove Albion in 2022. On 8 July 2025, he signed a professional contract with the latter, but was released the following June.

On 1 September 2026, Owusu joined Segunda División side Sabadell on a three-year deal. Due to bureaucratic issues, he was only registered in October, and made his professional debut on 9 November, coming on as a second-half substitute for José Luis Catalá in a 0–0 home draw against Real Sociedad B.
