= José Luis Romero (footballer) =

Spanish footballer and coach

Personal information
- Full name: José Luis Romero Robledo
- Date of birth: 5 January 1945 (age 81)
- Place of birth: Madrid, Spain
- Position: Midfielder

Senior career*
Years	Team	Apps	(Gls)
1964–1966	Villarrobledo		
1966–1967	Sabadell	5	(0)
1967–1968	Xerez	22	(1)
1968–1970	Sabadell	33	(0)
1970–1971	Barcelona	12	(0)
1971–1972	Sabadell	7	(0)
1972–1975	Espanyol	48	(0)
1975–1976	Burgos	26	(0)
1976–1977	Sant Andreu		

Managerial career
- 1980–1981: Sabadell
- 1983: Barcelona (interim)
- 1983–1984: Barcelona B
- 1984–1986: Real Oviedo
- 1988–1989: Sabadell
- 1989–1990: Logroñés
- 1990–1991: Betis
- 1992–1993: Cádiz
- 1994: Atlético Madrid
- 1994–1996: Sabadell
- 1998–1999: Gimnàstic
- * Club domestic league appearances and goals

José Luis Romero Robledo (born 5 January 1945 in Madrid) is a Spanish former footballer and coach.

Romero played for Villarrobledo, Sabadell, Xerez, Barcelona, Espanyol, Burgos and Sant Andreu.

Romero coached Sabadell, Barcelona (as interim), Real Oviedo, Logroñés, Betis, Cádiz and Atlético Madrid.
