= Rubén Martínez (footballer, born 1989) =

Spanish footballer

Personal information
- Full name: Rubén Martínez Alcarria
- Date of birth: 8 December 1989 (age 36)
- Place of birth: Mahón, Spain
- Height: 1.70 m (5 ft 7 in)
- Position: Winger

Team information
- Current team: Sabadell (technical secretary)

Youth career
- Mahón
- 2006–2008: Barcelona

Senior career*
Years	Team	Apps	(Gls)
2008–2009	Málaga B	18	(2)
2009–2010	Premià	18	(0)
2010–2011	Alicante	35	(2)
2011–2013	Celta B	40	(11)
2013–2014	Alcoyano	29	(4)
2015	Sant Andreu	17	(2)
2015–2016	La Hoya Lorca	36	(8)
2016–2017	Llagostera	31	(1)
2017–2018	Melilla	19	(0)
2018–2021	Logroñés	98	(13)
2021–2022	Albacete	50	(11)
2023–2024	Lamia	45	(7)
2024–2026	Sabadell	59	(10)
Total		495	(71)
- * Club domestic league appearances and goals

Rubén Martínez Granja (born 8 December 1989) is a Spanish retired footballer who played as a left winger, and the current technical secretary of CE Sabadell FC.

== Career ==
Born in Mahón, Menorca, Balearic Islands, Martínez finished his formation with FC Barcelona. He made his senior debut with Atlético Malagueño in the 2008–09 season, in Tercera División.

Martínez first arrived in Segunda División B in August 2010, with Alicante CF. He continued to appear in the division in the following years, representing Celta de Vigo B, CD Alcoyano, UE Sant Andreu, La Hoya Lorca CF, UE Llagostera, UD Melilla and UD Logroñés; with the latter he achieved promotion to Segunda División in 2020, contributing with five goals in 27 appearances (play-offs included).

Martínez made his professional debut on 12 September 2020, starting in a 0–1 away loss against Sporting de Gijón. His first professional goal occurred the following 9 May, but in a 4–1 loss at Girona FC.

On 11 August 2021, after Logroñés' relegation, Martínez signed a one-year contract with Albacete Balompié, also relegated to Primera División RFEF. He scored a career-best 11 goals during his first season, as Alba returned to the second division at first attempt.

On 19 December 2022, Martínez moved abroad for the first time in his career, after joining Super League Greece side PAS Lamia 1964. On 19 July 2024, he returned to Spain after agreeing to a deal with CE Sabadell FC in Segunda Federación.

On 28 July 2026, after achieving two consecutive promotions with the Arquelinats, Martínez announced his retirement at the age of 36, being immediately named the club's technical secretary.
