= Lino Gutiérrez (footballer) =

Spanish footballer

Lino
Personal information
- Full name: Lino Gutiérrez Casado
- Date of birth: 28 March 1959 (age 67)
- Place of birth: Sabadell, Spain
- Position: Midfielder

Youth career
- 1969–1976: Sabadell

Senior career*
Years	Team	Apps	(Gls)
1976–1992	Sabadell	345	(40)
1992–1993	Terrassa	?	(?)
- * Club domestic league appearances and goals

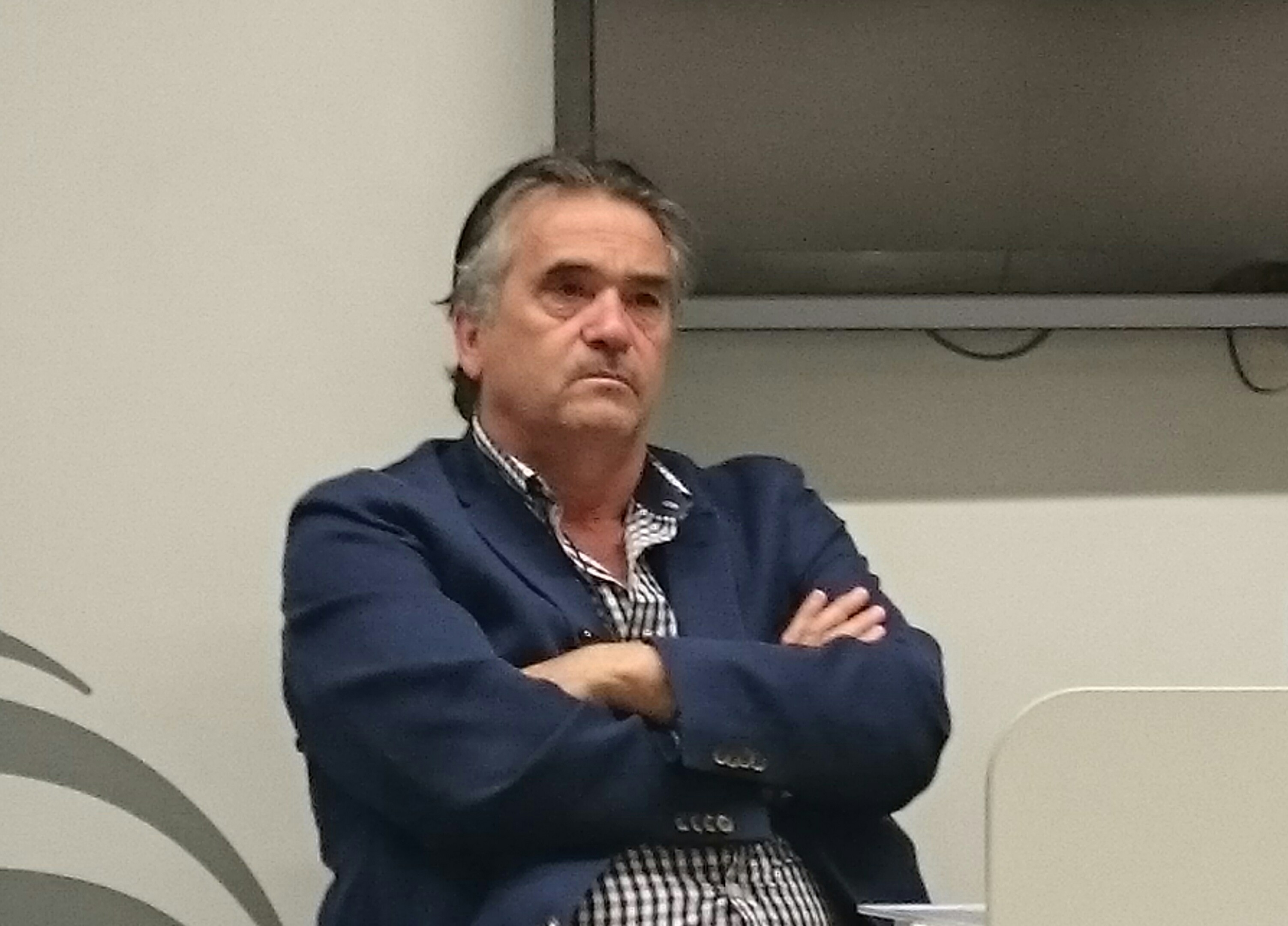
Gutiérrez Casado in 2017

Lino Gutiérrez Casado (born 28 March 1959 in Sabadell, Vallès Occidental, Catalonia) is a Spanish retired footballer who played as a midfielder. He holds the record as the most capped player in CE Sabadell history with 387 appearances for the club between 1976 and 1992. One of the stands at the Nova Creu Alta stadium is named after him.

He joined CE Sabadell as a 10-year-old in 1969 and played his first game with the first team on 20 September 1976 against Deportivo Aragón in La Romareda in the 1976–77 Tercera División.

He was the captain of the team that achieved the last promotion to the top flight on 18 May 1986 after defeating Atlético Madrileño 2–0 at home. The following season, the team survived in the first tier after succeeding in a dramatic relegation group in the 1986-87 La Liga. Twelve months later, relegation to Segunda División was confirmed on 22 May 1988 after losing 2–0 in San Mamés against Athletic Club and finishing second from bottom. Four months before, in the Copa del Rey quarter-finals first-leg, Sabadell had produced one of its most famous games ever after a dramatic comeback against Real Madrid in the second half. The Spanish giants were two goals ahead at half time, but Jordi Vinyals, Josep Maria Sala and Josep Villarroya scored in the second half to seal a memorable win. In the return leg at the Estadio Santiago Bernabéu, Real Madrid won 2–0 in the extra-time.

After retirement, he founded in 1993 a football academy in Sabadell, "Escola de Futbol de Sabadell", with his former CE Sabadell teammate José Francisco Gómez Tanco.
