= Ramón de Pablo Marañón =

Spanish footballer (1938–2025)

Personal information
- Date of birth: 21 April 1938
- Place of birth: San Román de la Llanilla, Spain
- Date of death: 13 May 2025 (aged 87)
- Height: 1.78 m (5 ft 10 in)
- Position: Midfielder

Senior career*
Years	Team	Apps	(Gls)
1956–1958	Atlético Madrid	11	(0)
1958–1960	Levante	37	(2)
1960–1961	Real Murcia	21	(4)
1961–1964	Barcelona	10	(1)
1962–1963	→ Córdoba	16	(1)
1963–1964	→ Gimnàstic Tarragona	11	(5)
1964–1965	Sabadell	14	(2)
1965–1966	Levante	12	(0)
1966–1972	Sabadell	140	(15)
1972–1973	Mallorca	5	(0)
Total		277	(30)

International career
1966–1968	Catalonia	2	(0)
- * Club domestic league appearances and goals

Ramón de Pablo Marañón (21 April 1938 – 13 May 2025) was a Spanish footballer who played as a midfielder.

Marañón started his career with Atlético Madrid in 1956 and finished with Mallorca, making his most notable contribution to Sabadell. He also appeared in two matches with the Catalonia national team from 1966 to 1968.

Marañón died on 13 May 2025, at the age of 87.
