= Alain Ribeiro =

Spanish footballer

Personal information
- Full name: Alain Ribeiro de Aguiar Miranda
- Date of birth: 8 July 1997 (age 29)
- Place of birth: Sopela, Spain
- Height: 1.88 m (6 ft 2 in)
- Position: Midfielder

Team information
- Current team: Sabadell
- Number: 21

Youth career
- Arenas Getxo
- 2015–2016: Danok Bat

Senior career*
Years	Team	Apps	(Gls)
2016–2020	Vitoria	85	(8)
2019–2020	→ Leioa (loan)	26	(2)
2020–2021	Barakaldo	25	(3)
2021–2022	Tudelano	32	(3)
2022–2023	Logroñés	31	(3)
2023–2025	Numancia	56	(13)
2025–2026	Pontevedra	34	(10)
2026–	Sabadell	1	(0)
- * Club domestic league appearances and goals as of 26 September 2026

Alain Ribeiro de Aguiar Miranda (born 8 July 1997) is a Spanish professional footballer who plays as a midfielder for Segunda División club CE Sabadell FC.

== Career ==
Born in Sopela, Biscay, Basque Country, Ribeiro represented Arenas Club de Getxo and Danok Bat CF as a youth before joining the structure of SD Eibar in 2016, being assigned to farm team CD Vitoria. On 22 March 2018, he renewed his contract with the club until 2021.

On 12 June 2020, after a one-year loan spell at Segunda División B side SD Leioa, Ribeiro terminated his link with the Armeros, and joined fellow division three side Barakaldo CF on 4 August. On 18 June 2021, he agreed to a deal with CD Tudelano of the newly-established Primera División RFEF.

On 25 June 2022, after suffering relegation, Ribeiro moved to SD Logroñés also in the third tier, but was unable to establish himself as a regular starter. On 4 July 2023, he was announced at Segunda Federación side CD Numancia.

On 28 June 2025, after two seasons missing out promotion in the play-offs, Ribeiro returned to the third division after signing for Pontevedra CF. On 1 July 2026, he agreed to a two-year deal with CE Sabadell FC, newly-promoted to Segunda División.

Ribeiro made his professional debut at the age of 29 on 26 September 2026, coming on as a second-half substitute for Joel Priego in a 1–1 away draw against RC Celta Fortuna.

== Personal life ==
Ribeiro's father Armando and his younger brother Iban are also footballers. The former played as a goalkeeper and notably represented Cádiz CF, while the latter is a forward who was also groomed at Danok Bat.
