= Ignasi Quer =

Spanish footballer (born 2004)

Personal information
- Full name: Ignasi Quer Tuneu
- Date of birth: 5 June 2004 (age 22)
- Place of birth: Gurb, Spain
- Height: 1.78 m (5 ft 10 in)
- Position: Forward

Team information
- Current team: Barcelona B
- Number: 23

Youth career
- Vic Riuprimer
- 2019–2020: Manresa
- 2020–2021: Vic Riuprimer
- 2021–2022: Manlleu
- 2022–2023: Girona

Senior career*
Years	Team	Apps	(Gls)
2022	Manlleu	13	(2)
2023–2025	Vic	71	(24)
2025–2026	L'Hospitalet	23	(15)
2026–	Barcelona B	4	(5)
- * Club domestic league appearances and goals as of 10:44, 4 October 2026 (UTC)

Ignasi Quer Tuneu (born 5 June 2004) is a Spanish professional footballer who plays as a forward for Segunda Federación club Barcelona Atlètic.

== Early and personal life ==
Quer was born in Gurb, Barcelona, Catalonia, to Lluís Quer and Judith Tuneu. His elder brother, Pius, is also a footballer, and currently plays for Manlleu. Whilst playing for Vic, Quer worked as a lunch monitor in a local school.

== Career ==
Quer began his career with Vic Riuprimer REFO, also spending a season in the academy of Manresa. At the age of seventeen, he moved to the club his brother was playing for as an amateur, Manlleu, where he was assigned to the club's academy. Following the arrival of manager Manel Sala, Quer was promoted to the first team, playing alongside his brother for the first time. However, he left Manlleu to join the academy of Girona in July 2022.

A relatively unproductive season with Vic followed, with Quer scoring three goals in twenty-nine league appearances, before being reunited with his brother, who signed for the club in July 2024. Quer's form improved over the next season and a half, and he established himself as a prolific goal-scorer, having helped Vic achieve promotion to the Tercera Federación.

After topping Vic's scoring charts in his second season with the club, Quer signed for L'Hospitalet mid-way through the 2025–26 season. He continued his prolific goal-scoring form, scoring his first goal for the club against Cerdanyola del Vallès on 14 December 2025, before following this with two goals in L'Hospitalet's 3–0 win against Montañesa a week later. He scored six goals in his first eight games for the club, and by the end of the season, he had scored fifteen in twenty-three appearances – delivering on a promise he had made upon signing, in which he took the number fifteen shirt, jokingly claiming he would score as many goals.

Quer signed for Barcelona on 2 July 2026, penning a two-year contract, and was assigned to the club's B-team. On his debut for Barcelona B in the Segunda Federación, Quer scored four goals as Barcelona won 5–0 against Náxara on 6 September 2026.

== Career statistics ==
=== Club ===
As of 3 October 2026.

Appearances and goals by club, season and competition
Club	Season	League			Cup (Note: Includes Copa del Rey)		Other		Total	
Club	Season	Division	Apps	Goals	Apps	Goals	Apps	Goals	Apps	Goals
Manlleu	2021–22	Primera Catalana	13	2	0	0	0	0	13	2
Vic	2023–24	Lliga Elit	29	3	0	0	0	0	29	3
Vic	2024–25	Lliga Elit	30	16	2	0	1 (Note: Appearances in the Copa Catalunya)	0	33	16
Vic	2025–26	Tercera Federación	12	5	0	0	0	0	12	5
Vic	Total		71	24	2	0	1	0	74	24
L'Hospitalet	2025–26	Tercera Federación	23	15	0	0	0	0	23	15
Barcelona B	2026–27	Segunda Federación	4	5	0	0	0	0	4	5
Career total			111	46	2	0	1	0	114	46
