= Miki Codina =

Spanish footballer

Personal information
- Full name: Miquel Codina Sayol
- Date of birth: 16 March 2002 (age 24)
- Place of birth: Sant Hipòlit de Voltregà, Spain
- Height: 1.85 m (6 ft 1 in)
- Position: Centre-back

Team information
- Current team: Sabadell
- Number: 4

Youth career
- Voltregà
- Manlleu
- 2016–2018: Damm
- 2018–2021: Betis

Senior career*
Years	Team	Apps	(Gls)
2021–2022	Betis B	0	(0)
2021–2022	→ Logroñés B (loan)	28	(2)
2022–2023	Logroñés B	22	(0)
2022–2024	Logroñés	33	(2)
2024–2025	Intercity	28	(0)
2025–2026	Zamora	31	(3)
2026–	Sabadell	1	(0)
- * Club domestic league appearances and goals as of 17 August 2026

Miquel "Miki" Codina Sayol (born 16 March 2002) is a Spanish professional footballer who plays as a centre-back for Segunda División club CE Sabadell FC.

== Career ==
Born in Sant Hipòlit de Voltregà, Barcelona, Catalonia, Codina joined Real Betis' youth sides in 2018, after representing CF Damm, AEC Manlleu and CF Voltregà. On 25 August 2021, after finishing his formation, he was loaned to UD Logroñés to play in their reserve team in Segunda División RFEF.

On 18 August 2022, Codina signed a permanent deal with Logroñés, and also featured rarely with the first team during the season. In July 2023, he was definitely promoted to the main squad now also in the fourth division, and quickly established himself as a first-choice.

On 2 July 2024, Codina was announced at CF Intercity in division three. The following 11 June, he agreed to a deal with fellow league team Zamora CF, and was a regular starter during the campaign as the club missed out promotion in the play-offs.

On 4 July 2026, Codina signed a one-year contract with CE Sabadell FC, newly-promoted to Segunda División. He made his professional debut on 17 August, starting in a 0–0 away draw against Sporting de Gijón.
