= Ferran Costa =

Spanish football manager (born 1994)

Personal information
- Full name: Ferran Costa Pinazo
- Date of birth: 1 October 1994 (age 32)
- Place of birth: Castelldefels, Spain
- Position: Goalkeeper

Team information
- Current team: Sabadell (manager)

Youth career
- Years: Team
- Castelldefels
- 2012–2013: Marianao Poblet
- 2013–2014: Prat

Managerial career
- 2009–2010: Castelldefels (youth)
- 2010–2014: Marianao Poblet (youth)
- 2014–2017: Damm (youth)
- 2017: Manresa (youth)
- 2017–2019: Gimnàstic Manresa (youth)
- 2019–2020: Terrassa (assistant)
- 2020–2023: Manresa
- 2023–2024: Badalona Futur
- 2024–2025: Andorra
- 2025–: Sabadell

Ferran Costa Pinazo (born 1 October 1994) is a Spanish football manager, currently in charge of CE Sabadell FC.

== Career ==
Born in Castelldefels, Barcelona, Catalonia, Costa played for UE Castelldefels, CD Marianao Poblet and AE Prat as a youth, while being a youth manager of the former two sides. In 2014, when signing for CF Damm, he retired and focused solely on managing.

In March 2017, after starting the season as a manager of the Cadete squad of Damm, Costa moved to CE Manresa to take over the Juvenil team. In June, he joined Club Gimnàstic de Manresa under the same role.

On 23 September 2019, Costa was named Xavi Molist's assistant at Terrassa FC. On 28 April of the following year, he agreed to return to Manresa to become their first team manager in Tercera División, while also working as a sporting director.

On 11 July 2022, after achieving promotion to Segunda Federación, Costa renewed his contract with Manresa. He left the club on 5 June 2023, after missing out on another promotion in the play-offs.

On 26 July 2023, Costa was named at the helm of fellow fourth division side CF Badalona Futur. The following 31 March, he left the club to take over Segunda División side FC Andorra on a contract until June 2025.

Costa's first professional match in charge occurred on 6 April 2024, a 2–0 away win over CD Eldense which took the Tricolors out of the relegation zone. Despite the club's relegation, he remained in charge until 20 January 2025, when he was sacked.

On 23 June 2025, Costa was appointed manager of CE Sabadell FC also in Primera Federación. He guided the team to a second-place finish in the regular season, and to an eventual promotion in the play-offs.

On 30 June 2026, Costa agreed to a two-year extension with the Arquelinats.

== Managerial statistics ==
As of 21 November 2026

Managerial record by team and tenure
Team	Nat	From	To	Record								Ref
Team	Nat	From	To	G	W	D	L	GF	GA	GD	Win %	Ref
Manresa	(Spain)	1 July 2020	5 June 2023	96	40	38	18	108	78	+30	41.67	
Badalona Futur	(Spain)	26 July 2023	31 March 2024	38	22	13	3	57	26	+31	57.89	
Andorra	(Andorra)	31 March 2024	20 January 2025	31	11	9	11	33	37	−4	35.48	
Sabadell	(Spain)	23 June 2025	present	65	28	24	13	87	54	+33	43.08	
Total				230	101	84	45	285	195	+90	43.91	—

== Honours ==
Badalona Futur

- Copa Federación de España: 2023

CE Sabadell

- Copa Catalunya: 2025–26
