= Josep Antoni Noya =

Spanish footballer (1939–2021)

Personal information
- Full name: Josep Antoni Noya Bou
- Date of birth: 23 August 1939
- Place of birth: Sant Pau d'Ordal, Spain
- Date of death: 10 January 2021 (aged 81)
- Position: Forward

Senior career*
Years	Team	Apps	(Gls)
1959–1960	Terrassa	6	(3)
1964–1967	Sabadell	71	(23)
1967	Atlético Madrid	0	(0)
1967–1968	Calvo Sotelo	20	(7)
1968–1971	Granada	34	(5)
Total		131	(38)
- * Club domestic league appearances and goals

Josep Antoni Noya Bou (23 August 1939 – 10 January 2021) was a Spanish professional footballer who played as a forward.

== Career ==
Born in Sant Pau d'Ordal, Noya played for Terrassa Sabadell, Atlético Madrid, Calvo Sotelo and Granada.
