= Hafiz Gariba =

Ghanaian footballer (born 2007)

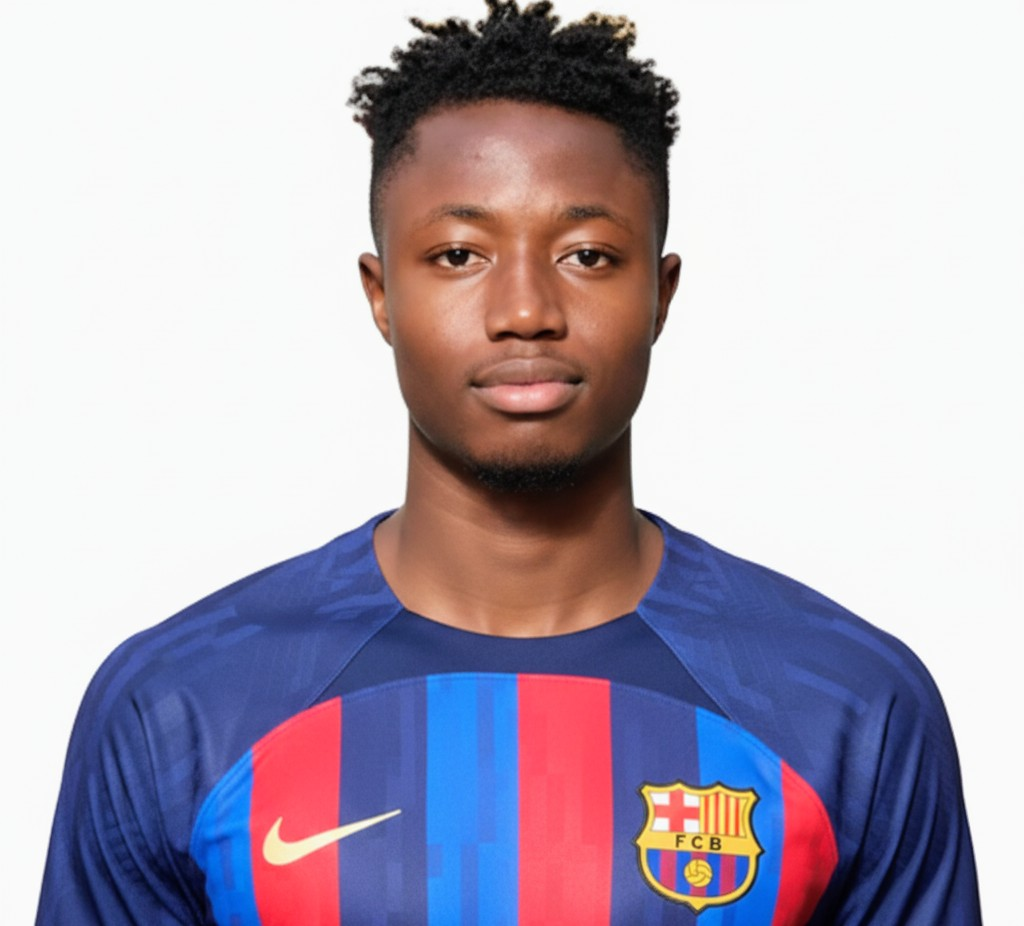

Personal information
- Full name: Hafiz Gariba
- Date of birth: 9 January 2007 (age 19)
- Place of birth: Teshie, Ghana
- Height: 1.87 m (6 ft 2 in)
- Position: Centre-back

Team information
- Current team: Barcelona B
- Number: 18

Youth career
- Fundación Marcet
- CE Codolar
- 2025–2026: Barcelona

Senior career*
Years	Team	Apps	(Gls)
2026–	Barcelona B	0	(0)
- * Club domestic league appearances and goals as of 2 December 2025

Hafiz Gariba (born 9 January 2007) is a Ghanaian professional footballer who plays as a centre-back for Segunda Federación club Barcelona Atlètic.

== Early life and youth career ==
Gariba was born in Teshie, in the Greater Accra Region of Ghana.

Hafiz Gariba began his football journey with Villarreal Africa, Ghanaian club. He moved to Spain and joined CE Codolar. He then joined Escola Marcet in Barcelona.

== Club career ==
FC Barcelona

On February 22, 2025, Gariba officially signed a three-year contract with Barcelona, Joining their youth team. He made his debut as a substitute in a 2–1 against Sant Andreu. In his second appearance, Hafiz scored a 2–2 draw against L'Hospitalet.
