= Orian Goren =

Israeli footballer (born 2009)

Personal information
- Full name: Orian Goren
- Date of birth: 15 March 2009 (age 17)
- Place of birth: Savyon, Israel
- Position: Midfielder

Team information
- Current team: Barcelona B
- Number: 28

Youth career
- 2017–2023: Maccabi Petah Tikva
- 2023–: Barcelona

Senior career*
Years	Team	Apps	(Gls)
2026–	Barcelona B	5	(0)

International career^{‡}
2024–2026	Israel U17	7	(1)
2025	Israel U18	2	(0)
2025–	Israel U19	6	(0)
2026–	Israel U21	2	(0)
- * Club domestic league appearances and goals ‡ National team caps and goals as of October 2026

Orian Goren (Hebrew: אוריין גורן; born 15 March 2009) is an Israeli professional footballer who plays as a midfielder for Segunda Federación club Barcelona Atlètic and the Israel national under-21 team.

== Early life ==
Goren was born in Savyon, Israel, to a family of Ashkenazi Jewish (Czech-Jewish) descent. His mother Dafna is a math teacher and his father Yarom is an airpilot.

He also holds a Czech passport, on account of his Ashkenazi Jewish ancestors, which eases the move to certain European football leagues.

== Club career ==
As a youth player, Goren joined the youth academy of Israeli side Maccabi Petah Tikva.

Following his family vacation in Barcelona, he joined the youth academy of Spanish side FC Barcelona, La Masia.

In August 2026 he played his first game with Barcelona in a 1-0 loss against Italian side Udinese. Later in the same month, he played in a 2–1 victory over Al Ahli.

On 25/10/26 he was first included in Barcelona's squad for the first El Clasico match for the season

== International career ==
Goren is an Israel youth international. During March 2025, he played for the Israel national under-17 football team for 2025 UEFA European Under-17 Championship qualification.

== Style of play ==
Goren plays as a midfielder. Spanish newspaper Sport wrote in 2025 that he is a "technically exquisite midfielder who stands out for his exceptional vision. His natural position is as a left winger, but he can play in other positions in midfield, as a false number 9, and even as a central midfielder".
