= Pedro Villar =

Spanish footballer (born 2008)

Personal information
- Full name: Pedro Villar Leyenda
- Date of birth: 11 January 2008 (age 18)
- Place of birth: Nigrán, Spain
- Height: 1.78 m (5 ft 10 in)
- Position: Midfielder

Team information
- Current team: Barcelona B
- Number: 6

Youth career
- –2022: Val Miñor
- 2022–2026: Barcelona

Senior career*
Years	Team	Apps	(Gls)
2026–	Barcelona B	9	(0)

International career^{‡}
2026–	Spain U18	1	(0)
- * Club domestic league appearances and goals ‡ National team caps and goals as of 14 January 2026

Pedro Villar Leyenda (born 11 January 2008) is a Spanish professional footballer who plays as a midfielder for Segunda Federación club Barcelona Atlètic.

== Early life ==
Villar was born on 11 January 2008 and has been nicknamed "Villi". Born Spain, he is a native of Nigrán, Spain. Growing up, he competed in athletics.

== Club career ==
As a youth player, Villar joined the youth academy of Val Miñor, where he played alongside Spain international Dro Fernández. Following his stint there, he joined the youth academy of La Liga side Barcelona in 2022, where he was known for his academic performance and played in the UEFA Youth League.

In 2026, he was promoted to the club's reserve team. On 7 January 2026, he debuted for them during a 2–2 home draw with Valencia B in the league. The same year, he renewed his contract with them until 2030.

== International career ==
Villar is a Spain youth international and has represented the country internationally at under-18 level. On 14 January 2026, he debuted for the Spain national under-18 football team during a 1–0 home friendly win over the Italy national under-18 football team.

== Style of play ==
Villar plays as a midfielder and is right-footed. Spanish news website Juvenil División de Honor wrote in 2026 that he "acts as a metronome in midfield. He excels at winning back possession, minimizing turnovers, and making runs into the box... coaches describe him as an athlete in a footballer's body. His impressive physique and skill make him ideal as the midfield maestro".
