= Ramiro Fernández =

Argentine footballer

Personal information
- Date of birth: 12 November 1995 (age 30)
- Place of birth: Baradero, Argentina
- Height: 1.72 m (5 ft 8 in)
- Position: Left-back

Team information
- Current team: Almirante Brown

Youth career
- Villa Dálmine

Senior career*
Years	Team	Apps	(Gls)
2015	Puerto Nuevo	22	(6)
2016–2018	Defensores Unidos	88	(0)
2018–2019	Acassuso	34	(1)
2019–2022	Atlanta	34	(0)
2022–2023	Almirante Brown	25	(0)
2023–2024	Cerro	21	(0)
2024–2025	River Plate Montevideo	22	(0)
2025–2026	Chaco For Ever	13	(0)
2026–	Almirante Brown	2	(0)
- * Club domestic league appearances and goals as of 17:22, 22 April 2026 (UTC)

Ramiro Fernández (born 12 November 1995) is an Argentine professional footballer who plays as a left-back for Almirante Brown.

== Career ==
After a youth stint with Villa Dálmine, Puerto Nuevo became Fernández's opening senior club in 2015. He played twenty-two times and scored six goals for them in Primera D Metropolitana as they placed twelfth that year. In 2016, Fernández moved to Defensores Unidos of Primera C Metropolitana. His stay lasted three seasons, with the midfielder making a total of eighty-eight appearances; the club won promotion to Primera B Metropolitana in his final campaign: 2017–18. On 7 June 2018, Acassuso completed the signing of Fernández. He made his debut in a fixture in August against Colegiales.

== Career statistics ==
As of 4 April 2019.

Appearances and goals by club, season and competition
Club	Season	League			Cup		Continental		Other		Total	
Club	Season	Division	Apps	Goals	Apps	Goals	Apps	Goals	Apps	Goals	Apps	Goals
Puerto Nuevo	2015	Primera D Metropolitana	22	6	0	0	—		0	0	22	6
Acassuso	2018–19	Primera B Metropolitana	28	0	0	0	—		0	0	28	0
Career total			50	6	0	0	—		0	0	50	6

== Honours ==
Defensores Unidos

- Primera C Metropolitana: 2017–18
