= 36 Lion FC =

36 Lion Football Club or 36 Lion FC
- Founded: 2000
- Ground: Legacy Practise Pitch, Surulere, Lagos
- Founder: Hajji Liameed Gafar
- Technical Director: Akinrele Francis

36 Lion Football Club or 36 Lion FC is a Nigerian football club based in Lagos. Founded in 2000, the club is known for its focus on youth development and participation in grassroots and scouting tournaments within Nigerian football.

The club is affiliated with the Nigeria Football Federation and the Lagos State Football Association and has participated in various domestic and international youth competitions.

36 Lion is known for producing several professional footballers, including Imoh Ezekiel, Peter Olayinka, Junior Ajayi, Yira Sor, Muhammed Tijani, Junior Olaitan among others.

== History ==
36 Lion Football Club was established in 2000 as a football development organisation aimed at identifying and nurturing young talent in Nigeria.

In its early years, the club focused on grassroots scouting and participation in local competitions within Lagos State, gradually expanding its activities to include structured training programmes and international exposure for players.

The club has taken part in various youth tournaments both within Nigeria and abroad, including participation in competitions such as the Chicago International Youth Cup. Through these platforms, 36 Lion FC has developed players who progressed to professional careers in Europe and other leagues.

== Notable players ==
Players developed by 36 Lion FC include:

Imoh Ezekiel – former Nigeria international who played for Standard Liège

Peter Olayinka – played for Red Star Belgrade and APOEL

Junior Ajayi – former Nigeria youth international and Olympic bronze medallist

Yira Sor – professional winger who has played in Europe

Muhammed Tijani – signed for Plymouth Argyle

The club has also produced multiple players who represented Nigeria at youth and Olympic levels, including participants in the 2016 Summer Olympics football tournament

== Achievements ==
- Lagos City Cup: 2023
- Lagos Supremacy cup: 2023
