= Josué Caicedo =

Ecuadorian footballer (born 2007)

Personal information
- Full name: Josué Javier Caicedo Porozo
- Date of birth: 24 September 2007 (age 19)
- Place of birth: Guayas, Ecuador
- Height: 1.83 m (6 ft 0 in)
- Positions: Left-back; winger

Team information
- Current team: Barcelona B (on loan from LDU Quito)
- Number: 5

Youth career
- LDU Quito

Senior career*
Years	Team	Apps	(Gls)
2026–	LDU Quito	7	(0)
2026–	→ Barcelona B (loan)	0	(0)
- * Club domestic league appearances and goals as of 16:53, 14 July 2026 (UTC)

Josué Javier Caicedo Porozo (born 24 September 2007) is an Ecuadorian professional footballer who plays as a left-back for Segunda Federación club Barcelona Atlètic, on loan from Ecuadorian Serie A club LDU Quito.

== Club career ==
=== LDU Quito ===
Having already appeared in a pre-season friendly against Independiente Juniors, Caicedo impressed in LDU Quito's 4–2 win against Bolivian opposition Club Always Ready on 7 February 2026 in the club's annual presentation, Noche Blanca. Such was his impact in pre-season, the club changed their plans to recruit a new left-back, trusting Caicedo to fill the role of back-up to Leonel Quiñónez.

Caicedo made his official debut for LDU Quito in their 2–1 LigaPro Serie A win against Orense on 20 February 2026. In only his second game for the club, he received a red card for serious foul play, following a high tackle on Macará full-back Denilson Bolaños. On his return to the first team following his suspension, he impressed once more, and in June 2026 it was reported in Ecuadorian and Spanish media that Caicedo had agreed to join Spanish La Liga club Barcelona for the 2026–27 season, initially on loan with the club's B team.

=== Barcelona B ===
On 13 July 2026, the move to Barcelona's B team was confirmed, and Caicedo joined on a one-year loan.

== Style of play ==
A winger, Caicedo has drawn comparisons to former LDU Quito player, Joffre Guerrón.

== Career statistics ==
As of 24 June 2026.

Appearances and goals by club, season and competition
Club	Season	League			Cup (Note: Includes Copa Ecuador)		Continental		Other		Total	
Club	Season	Division	Apps	Goals	Apps	Goals	Apps	Goals	Apps	Goals	Apps	Goals
LDU Quito	2026	LigaPro Serie A	7	0	0	0	1 (Note: Appearances in the Copa Libertadores)	0	—		8	0
Career total			7	0	0	0	1	0	0	0	8	0
