= José Ortega (footballer) =

Spanish footballer

Personal information
- Full name: José Ortega Díaz
- Date of birth: 25 November 1991 (age 34)
- Place of birth: Sant Boi de Llobregat, Spain
- Height: 1.85 m (6 ft 1 in)
- Position: Goalkeeper

Team information
- Current team: Sabadell
- Number: 13

Youth career
- 2008–2011: Terrassa

Senior career*
| Years | Team | Apps | (Gls) |
| 2010–2015 | Terrassa | 75 | (0) |
| 2011–2012 | → Júnior (loan) | | |
| 2015–2016 | Granollers | 38 | (0) |
| 2016–2023 | Terrassa | 188 | (0) |
| 2023–2024 | Badalona Futur | 34 | (0) |
| 2024– | Sabadell | 8 | (0) |
- * Club domestic league appearances and goals as of 25 May 2026

José Ortega Díaz (born 25 November 1991) is a Spanish professional footballer who plays as a goalkeeper for Segunda División club CE Sabadell FC.

== Career ==
Born in Sant Boi de Llobregat, Barcelona, Catalonia, Ortega represented Terrassa FC as a youth, and made his senior debut on 9 May 2010, starting in a 1–0 Segunda División B home win over CF Gavà, as both sides were already relegated. In 2011, after finishing his formation, he was loaned to Primera Catalana side Júnior FC, and was definitely included in the main squad upon returning.

A backup in the 2012–13 season, Ortega subsequently established himself as a starter for the Egarencs before moving to fellow fourth division side EC Granollers in June 2015. On 30 May 2016, after being an undisputed first-choice, he returned to Terrassa.

In July 2018, Ortega was named team captain at Terrassa, and remained a starter in the following three seasons (the third in Segunda División RFEF), agreeing to subsequent contract renewals. During the 2022–23 campaign, however, he lost his starting spot to new signing Marcos Pérez, and after featuring in just one league match during the year, he left the club on 16 May 2023, after 13 seasons and 294 matches.

On 31 July 2023, Ortega joined CF Badalona Futur also in division four. Back to a starting spot, he moved to fellow league team CE Sabadell FC on 23 August 2024.

A backup to Gianni Cassaro in his first year as the Arquelinats achieved promotion to Primera Federación, Ortega remained a second-choice – now behind Diego Fuoli – until January 2026, when he was separated from the first team squad due to a non-sport health issue. He underwent surgery in March, and returned to action in the following month; the issue was later revealed to be a tumor in the urinary tract.

On 13 July 2026, after being a part of the squad which achieved a second consecutive promotion to Segunda División, Ortega renewed his contract with Sabadell for a further year.
