= Kaiser (footballer) =

Spanish footballer

Personal information
- Full name: Juan Carlos Lázaro Cervera
- Date of birth: 4 April 1996 (age 30)
- Place of birth: Vilamarxant, Spain
- Height: 1.87 m (6 ft 2 in)
- Position: Centre-back

Team information
- Current team: Sabadell
- Number: 15

Youth career
- 2002–2004: Mislata
- 2004–2005: Levante
- 2005–2010: Valencia
- 2010–2011: Cracks
- 2011–2012: Valencia
- 2012–2013: Cracks
- 2013–2014: Valencia

Senior career*
Years	Team	Apps	(Gls)
2013–2016	Valencia B	4	(0)
2014–2016	→ Torre Levante (loan)	28	(0)
2016	→ Alzira (loan)	16	(0)
2016–2018	Levante B	59	(0)
2018–2020	Vitoria	28	(1)
2019–2020	→ Arenas Getxo (loan)	22	(1)
2020–2023	Alzira	73	(6)
2023–2025	Torrent	43	(3)
2025–	Sabadell	36	(1)

International career
2012	Spain U16	1	(0)
- * Club domestic league appearances and goals as of 29 August 2026

Juan Carlos Lázaro Cervera (born 4 April 1996), commonly known as Kaiser, is a Spanish professional footballer who plays as a centre-back for Segunda División club CE Sabadell FC.

== Club career ==
Born in Vilamarxant, Valencian Community, Kaiser played for Mislata CF, Levante UD, Valencia CF and CF Cracks as a youth. He made his senior debut with the Che's reserves on 16 November 2013, starting in a 1–0 Segunda División B home loss to Villarreal CF B.

In the following two seasons, Kaiser served loans at Tercera División sides CF Torre Levante and UD Alzira, On 22 July 2016, he moved to another reserve team, Atlético Levante UD in the third division.

On 2 July 2018, Kaiser signed a three-year contract with SD Eibar, being initially assigned to farm team CD Vitoria in the third level. After suffering relegation, he was loaned to fellow league team Arenas Club de Getxo roughly one year later, and was regularly used before terminated his link with the Armeros on 12 June 2020, as his loan expired.

On 11 August 2020, Kaiser returned to Alzira on a permanent deal, helping the club in their promotion to the newly-established Segunda División RFEF in his first season and subsequently renewing his link on 12 June 2021. On 1 June 2022, already established as a starter and team captain, he agreed to a one-year extension.

On 14 July 2023, Kaiser signed for Torrent CF also in division four. He quickly established himself as a starter for the side, before moving to fellow league team CE Sabadell FC on 3 February 2025.

On 3 July 2026, after being regularly used as the Arquelinats achieved two consecutive promotions, the last one to Segunda División, Kaiser renewed his contract for a further year. He made his professional debut at the age of 30 on 29 August, coming on as a late substitute for Ton Ripoll in a 1–0 home win over UD Almería.
