= Genar Fornés =

Spanish footballer

Personal information
- Full name: Genar Fornés Casasús
- Date of birth: 17 January 2000 (age 26)
- Place of birth: Barcelona, Spain
- Height: 1.80 m (5 ft 11 in)
- Position: Left-back

Team information
- Current team: Sabadell
- Number: 3

Youth career
- Espanyol

Senior career*
Years	Team	Apps	(Gls)
2019–2021	Espanyol B	10	(0)
2019–2020	→ Hospitalet (loan)	18	(0)
2020–2021	→ Llagostera (loan)	8	(0)
2021–2023	Cádiz B	55	(3)
2023–2024	Badalona Futur	31	(4)
2024–2025	Marbella	26	(2)
2025–	Sabadell	26	(2)
- * Club domestic league appearances and goals as of 9 November 2026

Genar Fornés Casasús (born 17 January 2000) is a Spanish professional footballer who plays as a left-back for Segunda División club CE Sabadell FC.

== Career ==
Born in Barcelona, Catalonia, Fornés represented RCD Espanyol as a youth, and made his senior debut with the reserves on 17 February 2019, coming on as a second-half substitute in a 1–1 Segunda División B away draw against SD Ejea. In August of that year, he was loaned to Tercera División side CE L'Hospitalet for one year.

On 4 October 2020, Fornés moved to UE Llagostera in the third division, also on loan. The following 4 February, after being sparingly used, he returned to his parent club.

On 5 July 2021, Fornés signed for another reserve team, Cádiz CF Mirandilla in the newly-established Segunda División RFEF. On 10 August 2023, he agreed to a deal back with Llagostera – now named CF Badalona Futur – also in division four.

On 28 June 2024, Fornés signed a one-year contract with Primera Federación side Marbella FC. On 7 July of the following year, he moved to fellow league team CE Sabadell FC, and was regularly used during the season as the club achieved promotion to Segunda División.

After missing the first three months of the campaign due to a hamstring injury, Fornés made his professional debut at the age of 26 on 9 November 2026, starting in a 0–0 home draw against Real Sociedad B.
