= José Luis Catalá =

Spanish footballer

Personal information
- Full name: José Luis Catalá Vázquez
- Date of birth: 16 August 2004 (age 22)
- Place of birth: Palma, Spain
- Height: 1.88 m (6 ft 2 in)
- Position: Centre-back

Team information
- Current team: Sabadell
- Number: 27

Youth career
- Sporting Ciutat de Palma
- 2020–2023: Espanyol
- 2021–2022: → Sabadell (loan)

Senior career*
Years	Team	Apps	(Gls)
2022–2026	Espanyol B	71	(2)
2024	Espanyol	0	(0)
2026–	Sabadell	1	(0)
- * Club domestic league appearances and goals as of 17 August 2026

José Luis Catalá Vázquez (born 16 August 2004) is a Spanish professional footballer who plays as a centre-back for Segunda División club CE Sabadell FC.

== Career ==
Born in Palma de Mallorca, Balearic Islands, Catalá joined RCD Espanyol's youth sides in July 2020, from hometown side Sporting Ciutat de Palma. He also spent a season on loan at CE Sabadell FC's Juvenil squad in the 2021–22 season, before making his senior debut with the reserves on 11 December 2022, playing the last three minutes of a 1–0 Segunda Federación home win over SD Formentera.

On 14 December 2023, Catalá renewed his contract with the Pericos until 2027. He made his first team debut the following 31 October, starting in a 4–0 away routing of San Tirso SD, for the campaign's Copa del Rey.

In November 2024, Catalá suffered a knee injury which sidelined him until the following September. On 14 July 2026, he returned to Sabadell on a two-year deal, now assigned to the first team in Segunda División.

Catalá made his professional debut on 17 August 2026, coming on as a late substitute for Arthur Bonaldo in a 0–0 away draw against Sporting de Gijón.
