= Miguelete =

Spanish footballer

Personal information
- Full name: Miguel Ángel Ramírez Carrasco
- Date of birth: 9 May 2001 (age 25)
- Place of birth: Jerez de la Frontera, Spain
- Height: 1.86 m (6 ft 1 in)
- Position: Attacking midfielder

Team information
- Current team: Logroñés (on loan from Sabadell)

Youth career
- Betis
- 2013–2017: Barcelona
- 2017–2020: Betis

Senior career*
Years	Team	Apps	(Gls)
2018–2020	Betis B	3	(2)
2020–2021	Peña Deportiva	15	(0)
2021–2022	Sanluqueño	36	(2)
2022–2024	Atlético Baleares	44	(5)
2024	Recreativo Huelva	12	(0)
2024–	Sabadell	57	(15)
2026–	→ Logroñés (loan)	0	(0)
- * Club domestic league appearances and goals as of 25 May 2026

Miguel Ángel Ramírez Carrasco (born 9 May 2001), commonly known as Miguelete, is a Spanish professional footballer who plays as an attacking midfielder for UD Logroñés, on loan from CE Sabadell FC.

== Career ==
Born in Jerez de la Frontera, Cádiz, Andalusia, Miguelete joined FC Barcelona's La Masia in 2013, from Real Betis, but returned to his former side in 2017. He made his senior debut with the reserves on 13 May 2018, four days after his 17th birthday, by starting in a 5–0 Segunda División B away loss to Extremadura UD, as his side was already relegated.

On 25 August 2020, after finishing his formation, Miguelete signed for SCR Peña Deportiva in the third division. The following 22 July, after being sparingly used, he moved to Atlético Sanluqueño CF of the newly-established Primera División RFEF.

In the 2022 pre-season, Miguelete was on trial at CD Atlético Baleares, subsequently signing a deal with the club and being assigned to farm team CE Santanyí. On 12 July 2023, after being regularly used in the third division, he agreed to a one-year extension, now fully integrated in the first team.

On 31 January 2024, Miguelete terminated his link with ATB, and signed for fellow division three side Recreativo de Huelva just hours later. On 26 August, he agreed to a contract with Segunda Federación side CE Sabadell FC, and finished the season with a career-best 12 goals as the club achieved promotion to the third tier.

Despite becoming mainly a backup option with the Arquelinats in the 2025–26 campaign, Miguelete contributed with four goals in 34 appearances overall as the club achieved a second consecutive promotion to Segunda División, and renewed his link until 2028 on 7 July 2026. On 3 September, however, he was loaned to third division side UD Logroñés for one year.
