= David Astals =

Spanish footballer

Personal information
- Full name: David Astals Barrera
- Date of birth: 13 December 2001 (age 24)
- Place of birth: Bienvenida, Spain
- Height: 1.75 m (5 ft 9 in)
- Position: Right-back

Team information
- Current team: Ibiza

Youth career
- Polinyà
- Sabadell

Senior career*
Years	Team	Apps	(Gls)
2019–2021	Sabadell B	4	(0)
2020–2024	Sabadell	76	(2)
2021	→ Prat (loan)	15	(0)
2024–	Ibiza	30	(2)
2025–2026	→ Sabadell (loan)	30	(1)

International career^{‡}
2025–	Catalonia	1	(0)
- * Club domestic league appearances and goals as of 25 May 2026 ‡ National team caps and goals as of 14:23, 19 November 2025 (UTC)

David Astals Barrera (born 13 December 2001) is a Spanish professional footballer who plays for UD Ibiza. Mainly a right-back, he can also play as a midfielder.

== Club career ==
Born in Bienvenida, Badajoz, Extremadura, Astals moved to Sabadell, Barcelona, Catalonia aged only two months due to a family issue, and joined CE Sabadell FC's youth setup after representing CA Polinyà. He made his senior debut with the reserves on 22 December 2019, playing the last 31 minutes in a 0–1 Segona Catalana away loss against CE Sallent. In the youth teams of the club, he played mainly as an attacking midfielder.

Astals made his first team debut on 19 September 2020, coming on as a late substitute for Héber Pena in a 1–2 loss at Rayo Vallecano in the Segunda División championship; by doing so, he became the first player born in the 21st century to appear for the club. Three days later, he renewed his contract with the club for a further two seasons.

On 21 January 2021, Astals was loaned to Segunda División B side AE Prat until June. Upon returning, he was rarely used during the 2021–22 season due to an injury, before subsequently establishing himself a regular starter as a right-back.

On 7 July 2024, after Sabadell's relegation, Astals signed a two-year contract with UD Ibiza in Primera Federación. On 18 July of the following year, he returned to his previous club on a one-year loan deal, and was again a first-choice during the campaign as the Arlequinats returned to the second division after a five-year absence.

== International career ==
Astals debuted with the Catalonia team in a friendly 2–1 win over Palestine on 18 November 2025.
