= Óscar Sanz =

Spanish footballer

Personal information
- Full name: Óscar Sanz Naval
- Date of birth: 8 March 2000 (age 26)
- Place of birth: Sant Sadurní d'Anoia, Spain
- Height: 1.83 m (6 ft 0 in)
- Position: Midfielder

Team information
- Current team: Sabadell
- Number: 14

Youth career
- Gimnàstic

Senior career*
| Years | Team | Apps | (Gls) |
| 2018–2021 | Pobla Mafumet | 71 | (4) |
| 2019–2026 | Gimnàstic | 88 | (3) |
| 2022 | → Ebro (loan) | 18 | (4) |
| 2022–2023 | → Unionistas (loan) | 35 | (2) |
| 2026– | Sabadell | 1 | (0) |
- * Club domestic league appearances and goals as of 17 August 2026

Óscar Sanz Naval (born 8 March 2000) is a Spanish professional footballer who plays as a midfielder for Segunda División club CE Sabadell FC.

== Career ==
Born in Sant Sadurní d'Anoia, Barcelona, Catalonia, Sanz represented Gimnàstic de Tarragona as a youth, and was promoted to the farm team on 6 July 2018. He made his senior debut on 19 August, starting in a 1–1 Tercera División home draw against UE Llagostera.

Sanz scored his first senior goal on 15 September 2019, netting Pobla's winner in a 1–0 home success over FC Vilafranca. Thirteen days later, he made his first team debut by starting in a 1–0 Segunda División B away loss against Lleida Esportiu; he became the first player of the 21st century to play for the club.

Sanz was definitely promoted to Nàstic's main squad in June 2021, after renewing his contract. However, he could not break into Raül Agné's squad, and was loaned to Segunda División RFEF side CD Ebro on 4 January 2022.

On 15 July 2022, Sanz was loaned to fellow Primera Federación side Unionistas de Salamanca CF for the season. He became a regular starter for the club before returning to Gimnàstic in June 2023; he also renewed his contract for a further year.

On 8 May 2024, Sanz renewed his link with Gimnàstic until 2026. He left the club after his contract expired, and signed a two-year deal with Segunda División side CE Sabadell FC on 9 July 2026.

Sanz made his professional debut on 17 August 2026, starting in a 0–0 away draw against Sporting de Gijón.
