= Gastón Valles =

Uruguayan footballer

Personal information
- Full name: Gastón Joaquín Valles Velázquez
- Date of birth: 10 May 2001 (age 25)
- Place of birth: Montevideo, Uruguay
- Height: 1.92 m (6 ft 4 in)
- Position: Forward

Team information
- Current team: Sabadell
- Number: 12

Youth career
- Defensor Sporting

Senior career*
Years	Team	Apps	(Gls)
2021–2022	Atlético Benidorm	9	(5)
2022–2024	Vélez	43	(10)
2024	Espanyol B	5	(2)
2024–2025	Espanyol	12	(0)
2024–2025	→ Cartagena (loan)	25	(3)
2025–2026	Unionistas	12	(4)
2026	Tenerife	16	(3)
2026–	Sabadell	9	(1)
- * Club domestic league appearances and goals as of 15 November 2026

Gastón Joaquín Valles Velázquez (born 10 May 2001) is a Uruguayan professional footballer who plays as a forward for Segunda División club CE Sabadell FC.

== Career ==
Born in Montevideo, Valles played for Defensor Sporting as a youth before moving to Spain in October 2021, after signing for Primera FFCV side FC Atlético Benidorm CD. Ahead of the 2022–23 season, he joined Vélez CF in Segunda Federación.

On 29 January 2024, Valles signed a two-and-a-half-year contract with Segunda División side RCD Espanyol, being initially assigned to the reserves also in the fourth division. He made his professional debut on 24 February, coming on as a late substitute for Álvaro Aguado and providing an assist to José Carlos Lazo's winner in a 3–2 away success over SD Eibar.

Valles contributed with 14 appearances with the main squad of the Pericos during the 2023–24 campaign, as they achieved promotion to La Liga. On 14 August 2024, he renewed his link until 2027 and was immediately loaned to FC Cartagena in the second division, for one year.

On 6 August 2025, Valles terminated his contract with Espanyol, and signed for Primera Federación side Unionistas de Salamanca CF on 8 October. The following 19 January, he moved to fellow league team CD Tenerife on a two-and-a-half-year deal, and helped the club to achieve promotion to division two before departing on 28 July 2026.

On 30 July 2026, Valles signed a one-year contract with CE Sabadell FC, also promoted to division two.
