= Albert Orriols =

Spanish footballer

Personal information
- Full name: Albert Orriols Cerarols
- Date of birth: 2 December 1997 (age 28)
- Place of birth: Vic, Spain
- Height: 1.70 m (5 ft 7 in)
- Position: Midfielder

Team information
- Current team: Sabadell
- Number: 20

Senior career*
Years	Team	Apps	(Gls)
2017–2020	Vic Riuprimer	59	(25)
2020–2021	Vic	18	(3)
2021–2022	Figueres	24	(6)
2022–2024	Olot	53	(4)
2024–	Sabadell	63	(1)

International career^{‡}
2025–	Catalonia	1	(0)
- * Club domestic league appearances and goals as of 17 October 2026 ‡ National team caps and goals as of 18 November 2025

Albert Orriols Cerarols (born 2 December 1997), sometimes known as Urri, is a Spanish professional footballer who plays as a midfielder for Segunda División club CE Sabadell FC.

== Club career ==
Born in Vic, Barcelona, Catalonia, Orriols began playing for hometown side Vic Riuprimer REFO FC in 2017, in Segona Catalana. He moved to neighbouring side UE Vic in Primera Catalana on 30 May 2020, before signing for Tercera División RFEF side UE Figueres on 8 July of the following year.

On 13 June 2022, despite suffering relegation, Orriols agreed to a deal with UE Olot in Segunda Federación. He dropped down a level in his first year, but helped the side to return at first attempt in his second.

On 19 June 2024, Orriols moved to CE Sabadell FC also in the fourth division. He scored once in 23 matches overall as the club achieved promotion to Primera Federación, and renewed his contract for a further year on 14 July 2025.

Orriols made his professional debut at the age of 28 on 17 August 2026, starting in a 0–0 away draw against Sporting de Gijón.

== International career ==
On 13 November 2025, Orriols was called up to the Catalonia national team for a friendly against Palestine. He made his international debut five days later, playing the entire second half in the 2–1 win at the Estadi Olímpic Lluís Companys.
