= Eneko Aguilar =

Spanish footballer

Personal information
- Full name: Eneko Aguilar Elizalde
- Date of birth: 21 April 2000 (age 26)
- Place of birth: Berriozar, Spain
- Height: 1.78 m (5 ft 10 in)
- Position: Midfielder

Team information
- Current team: Sabadell
- Number: 24

Youth career
- Pamplona
- 2018–2019: Lleida Esportiu

Senior career*
Years	Team	Apps	(Gls)
2018–2019	Lleida Esportiu B	11	(0)
2019–2021	Lleida Esportiu	29	(0)
2021–2024	Osasuna B	103	(16)
2024–2025	Bilbao Athletic	30	(1)
2025–2026	Ponferradina	16	(0)
2026–	Sabadell	17	(1)
- * Club domestic league appearances and goals as of 17 August 2026

Eneko Aguilar Elizalde (born 21 April 2000) is a Spanish professional footballer who plays as a midfielder for Segunda División club CE Sabadell FC.

== Career ==
Born in Berriozar, Navarre, Aguilar joined Lleida Esportiu's youth sides in 2018, from CD Pamplona. He made his senior debut with the reserves in Primera Catalana shortly after, before starting to feature with the main squad in the following year, and subsequently renewed his contract until 2022 on 11 September 2019.

On 17 July 2021, Aguilar signed for CA Osasuna and was assigned to the B-team in Segunda División RFEF. He quickly established himself as a first-choice, helping Promesas in their promotion to Primera Federación in his first year, before leaving the club in June 2024.

On 30 June 2024, Aguilar moved to another reserve team, Bilbao Athletic also in the third division. On 15 July of the following year, he agreed to a deal with fellow league team SD Ponferradina.

On 30 January 2026, Aguilar joined CE Sabadell FC, still in division three. He finished the season with a promotion to Segunda División, also scoring the decisive goal in the promotion play-offs final over Zamora CF which overturned a first leg 1–0 deficit.

Aguilar made his professional debut at the age of 26 on 17 August 2026, coming on as a second-half substitute for Pere Pons in a 0–0 away draw against Sporting de Gijón.
