= Arthur Bonaldo =

Brazilian footballer

Personal information
- Full name: Arthur Renan Bonaldo
- Date of birth: 18 February 1996 (age 30)
- Place of birth: Palotina, Brazil
- Height: 1.81 m (5 ft 11 in)
- Positions: Centre-back; defensive midfielder

Team information
- Current team: Sabadell
- Number: 5

Youth career
- 2009: Toledo
- 2010–2011: Internacional
- 2011–2014: Desportivo Brasil
- 2014–2015: Estoril
- 2015–2016: Flamengo

Senior career*
| Years | Team | Apps | (Gls) |
| 2017 | Linense | 0 | (0) |
| 2019–2022 | Internacional Madrid | 64 | (9) |
| 2022–2023 | Numancia | 36 | (3) |
| 2023–2024 | Estepona | 26 | (2) |
| 2024– | Sabadell | 57 | (5) |
- * Club domestic league appearances and goals as of 17 August 2026

Arthur Renan Bonaldo (born 18 February 1996) is a Brazilian professional footballer who plays as either a centre-back or a defensive midfielder for Segunda División club CE Sabadell FC.

== Career ==
Born in Palotina, Paraná, Bonaldo began his career at the age of 12 with Toledo, and subsequently represented the youth sides of Internacional and Desportivo Brasil before moving to Portugal in 2014, with Estoril; in 2013, he also had an unsuccessful trial at Anderlecht. He returned to his home country in July 2015, joining the under-20 team of Flamengo.

Bonaldo helped Fla to win the 2016 Copa São Paulo de Futebol Júnior, but featured as a left-back in the competition. He left the club in the end of that year as his contract expired, and signed for Linense to play in the 2017 Campeonato Paulista, but was unable to make an appearance for the club.

Six months after departing Linense, Bonaldo went on a trial at Leganés' B-team, but returned to Brazil after not signing a contract. He later returned to Spain to train with Internacional de Madrid, spending three months at the club before being offered a deal shortly after their promotion to Segunda División B; however, he refused the offer and returned to his home country.

Bonaldo finally signed a contract with Inter de Madrid in 2019, and despite being sparingly used, he still renewed his link on 19 August 2020. After establishing himself as a starter, he signed a two-year deal with fellow Primera Federación side CD Numancia on 28 June 2022.

In August 2023, after suffering relegation, Bonaldo moved to CD Estepona FS in the Segunda Federación. On 4 August 2024, he was announced at CE Sabadell FC also in the fourth division.

A backup option in his first year as the Arquelinats achieved promotion to division three, Bonaldo was subsequently converted into a centre-back in his second season, and scored three goals in 43 appearances overall as the club achieved a second consecutive promotion, now to Segunda División. On 10 July 2026, he extended his link for a further year.

Bonaldo made his professional debut at the age of 30 on 17 August 2026, starting in a 0–0 away draw against Sporting de Gijón.
