= Javi López-Pinto =

Spanish footballer

Personal information
- Full name: Javier López-Pinto Dorado
- Date of birth: 5 May 2001 (age 25)
- Place of birth: Barcelona, Spain
- Height: 1.83 m (6 ft 0 in)
- Position: Winger

Team information
- Current team: Sabadell
- Number: 19

Youth career
- Cornellà

Senior career*
Years	Team	Apps	(Gls)
2020–2022	Cerdanyola	54	(3)
2022–2023	Burgos B	32	(3)
2022–2025	Burgos	6	(0)
2024	→ Algeciras (loan)	17	(5)
2025	Ibiza	20	(2)
2025–	Sabadell	37	(9)
- * Club domestic league appearances and goals as of 25 May 2026

Javier "Javi" López-Pinto Dorado (born 5 May 2001) is a Spanish professional footballer who plays mainly as a left winger for Segunda División club CE Sabadell FC.

== Club career ==
Born in Barcelona, Catalonia, López-Pinto was a UE Cornellà youth graduate. On 18 June 2020, after finishing his formation, he signed for Tercera División side Cerdanyola del Vallès FC.

López-Pinto made his senior debut on 25 October 2020, playing the last 13 minutes in a 1–1 away draw against EC Granollers, and featured in 24 more matches during the season as his side achieved a first-ever promotion to Segunda División RFEF. He scored his first senior goal on 5 December 2021, netting his team's second in a 2–0 home win over Terrassa FC; despite scoring two further times, his side ultimately suffered relegation.

In July 2022, López-Pinto moved to Burgos CF, being initially assigned to the reserves but making the pre-season with the first team. He made his professional debut on 14 August, coming on as a late substitute for Pablo Valcarce in a 1–0 home win over Málaga CF.

On 26 January 2024, López-Pinto was loaned to Primera Federación side Algeciras CF for the remainder of the season. On 3 January 2025, after just two matches, he terminated his link with Burgos, and signed a short-term deal with UD Ibiza in the third division just hours later.

On 10 July 2025, López-Pinto signed for CE Sabadell FC, still in division three.
