= Quadri Liameed =

Nigerian footballer

Personal information
- Date of birth: 8 April 2002 (age 24)
- Place of birth: Lagos, Nigeria
- Height: 1.74 m (5 ft 9 in)
- Position: Midfielder

Team information
- Current team: Sabadell
- Number: 22

Youth career
- 36 Lion FC
- 2020–2021: → Villarreal (loan)

Senior career*
Years	Team	Apps	(Gls)
2020–2022	36 Lion FC		
2020–2021	→ Villarreal C (loan)	5	(0)
2022	→ Vall de Uxó (loan)	9	(1)
2022–2025	Lleida	92	(0)
2025–	Sabadell	48	(1)

International career
2019	Nigeria U20		
- * Club domestic league appearances and goals as of 19 October 2026

Quadri Liameed (born 8 April 2002) is a Nigerian professional footballer who plays as a midfielder for Segunda División club CE Sabadell FC.

== Club career ==
Born in Lagos, Liameed began his career with his hometown side, 36 Lion FC before agreeing to a loan deal with Villarreal in 2020. After being rarely used in the club's Juvenil and C-team squads, he returned to 36 Lion in July 2021, but spent the entire summer targeted by another Spanish clubs.

After the 2021 summer transfer market ended, Liameed trained with a Slovenian side before returning to Spain in November, and began training with the reserve side of Castellón, agreeing to a contract on the 28th. However, the deal fell through in late January 2022 due to a lack of registration from 36 Lion, and the player ended up representing Vall de Uxó in the regional leagues.

On 15 August 2022, Liameed signed a three-year contract with Segunda Federación side Lleida Esportiu. He was an immediate starter for the side, being touted to a move to Al Qadsiah in 2024.

On 12 July 2025, Liameed agreed to a deal with Sabadell of the Primera Federación. He was immediately a first-choice for the side during the season, scoring twice in 43 matches overall as the club achieved promotion to Segunda División.

Liameed made his professional debut on 17 August 2026, starting in a 0–0 away draw against Sporting de Gijón.
