= Diego Fuoli =

Spanish footballer

Personal information
- Full name: Diego Licinio Lázaro Fuoli
- Date of birth: 20 October 1997 (age 29)
- Place of birth: Zaragoza, Spain
- Height: 1.88 m (6 ft 2 in)
- Position: Goalkeeper

Team information
- Current team: Sabadell
- Number: 1

Youth career
- Stadium Casablanca
- 2015–2016: Villarreal

Senior career*
Years	Team	Apps	(Gls)
2016–2017	Villarreal C	36	(0)
2017–2020	Villarreal B	48	(0)
2020–2021	Sabadell	1	(0)
2021–2022	Almería B	29	(0)
2022–2023	Almería	1	(0)
2023–2024	San Fernando	37	(0)
2024–2025	Tarazona	34	(0)
2025–	Sabadell	37	(0)
- * Club domestic league appearances and goals as of 25 May 2026

Diego Licinio Lázaro Fuoli (born 20 October 1997) is a Spanish professional footballer who plays as a goalkeeper for Segunda División club CE Sabadell FC.

== Club career ==
Born in Zaragoza, Aragon, Fuoli joined Villarreal CF's youth setup in 2015, from Stadium Casablanca. Promoted to the C-team for the 2016–17 season, he made his senior debut on 20 August 2016 by starting in a 2–2 Tercera División away draw against UD Alzira.

After being a regular starter for the C-side, Fuoli was promoted to the reserves in July 2017. A backup to Ander Cantero in his first season and to Joan Femenías in his second, he became a regular starter in his third, but left the club on 30 June 2020.

On 13 August 2020, Fuoli agreed to a contract with CE Sabadell, newly promoted to Segunda División. He made his professional debut on 5 November, starting in a 12– home loss against UD Almería.

On 6 August 2021, after featuring rarely, Fuoli moved to another reserve team, UD Almería B in Tercera División RFEF. Initially a third-choice in the first team behind Fernando Martínez and Giorgi Makaridze, he was definitely promoted to the squad ahead of the 2022–23 campaign; despite the departure of the Georgian, he remained a third-choice after the arrival of Fernando Pacheco.

Fuoli made his first team debut for the Rojiblancos on 13 November 2022, starting in a 2–0 away loss against CD Arenteiro, for the season's Copa del Rey. The following 11 July, he moved to Primera Federación side San Fernando CD.

An undisputed starter, Fuoli joined fellow third division side SD Tarazona on 2 July 2024, where he was again a first-choice. Roughly one year later, he returned to Sabadell, and featured in 42 matches overall during the campaign as the club achieved promotion to division two.

== Controversies ==
In June 2026, during the celebrations following the promotion of Sabadell to division two, Fuoli encouraged supporters to chant insults directed at Prime Minister of Spain Pedro Sánchez. The incident prompted the Government Delegate in Catalonia, Carlos Prieto Gómez, to call on Fuoli to issue a public apology to Sánchez, arguing that the chants encouraged social division through offensive and unsporting behaviour. In addition, the Federation of Neighbourhood Associations of Sabadell filed a complaint against the player alleging a hate crime. Shortly after, he apologized for the incident.
