= Ton Ripoll =

Spanish footballer

Personal information
- Full name: Ton Ripoll Molera
- Date of birth: 27 May 1998 (age 28)
- Place of birth: Santpedor, Spain
- Height: 1.78 m (5 ft 10 in)
- Positions: Right-back; winger

Team information
- Current team: Sabadell
- Number: 7

Youth career
- 2006–2009: Santpedor
- 2009–2010: Damm
- 2010–2011: Santpedor
- 2011–2012: Manresa
- 2012–2015: Gimnàstic de Manresa
- 2015–2016: Mercantil
- 2016–2017: Celta

Senior career*
Years	Team	Apps	(Gls)
2017–2018	Vilafranca	19	(0)
2018–2020	Hospitalet	66	(12)
2020–2021	Oviedo B	9	(2)
2021	Murcia	5	(0)
2021–2023	Peña Deportiva	55	(5)
2023–2024	Lleida Esportiu	33	(2)
2024–	Sabadell	57	(3)
- * Club domestic league appearances and goals as of 10 November 2026

Ton Ripoll Molera (born 27 May 1998) is a Spanish professional footballer who plays as either a right-back or a right winger for Segunda División club CE Sabadell FC.

== Career ==
Born in Santpedor, Barcelona, Catalonia, Ripoll began his career with hometown side CF Santpedor at the age of eight. He subsequently represented CF Damm, CE Manresa, Club Gimnàstic de Manresa and CE Mercantil before joining RC Celta de Vigo's Juvenil squad in July 2016.

On 7 July 2017, after finishing his formation, Ripoll returned to his native region and joined Tercera División side FC Vilafranca. On 20 July of the following year, he was presented at fellow league team CE L'Hospitalet.

On 12 August 2020, after two seasons as a starter, Ripoll moved to Real Oviedo and was initially assigned to the reserves in the Segunda División B. The following 22 January, he terminated his link with the club, and signed for Real Murcia CF of the same division five days later.

On 2 July 2021, Ripoll agreed to a deal with SCR Peña Deportiva in the newly-established Segunda División RFEF. On 26 June 2023, he was announced at fellow league team Lleida Esportiu.

On 18 June 2024, Ripoll moved to CE Sabadell FC still in division four. Despite quickly establishing himself as a starter, he suffered a season-ending injury in February 2025, but still renewed his contract until 2027 on 26 March.

Ripoll was regularly used for the Arquelinats in the 2025–26 campaign, featuring in 35 matches overall as the club achieved promotion to Segunda División. He made his professional debut at the age of 28 on 17 August 2026, starting in a 0–0 away draw against Sporting de Gijón.
