= Xavi Moreno (footballer, born 2004) =

Spanish footballer (born 2004)

Personal information
- Full name: Xavier Moreno Hernández
- Date of birth: 5 November 2004 (age 22)
- Place of birth: Torrelles de Llobregat, Spain
- Height: 1.75 m (5 ft 9 in)
- Position: Winger

Team information
- Current team: Sabadell

Youth career
- Cornellà
- 2019–2023: Barcelona

Senior career*
Years	Team	Apps	(Gls)
2023–2025	Valladolid B	68	(11)
2025–2026	Valladolid	6	(0)
2026	→ Sabadell (loan)	14	(0)
2026–	Sabadell	0	(0)
- * Club domestic league appearances and goals as of 25 May 2026

Xavier "Xavi" Moreno Hernández (born 5 November 2004) is a Spanish footballer who plays for Segunda División club CE Sabadell FC. Mainly a winger, he can also play as a left-back.

== Career ==
Born in Torrelles de Llobregat, Barcelona, Catalonia, Moreno represented UE Cornellà as a youth before joining FC Barcelona's youth sides in July 2019. On 12 July 2023, after finishing his formation, he signed a two-year deal with Real Valladolid, being initially assigned to the reserves in Segunda Federación.

A left-back during most of the 2023–24 season, Moreno was later converted into a winger and started to score and assist in a more regular basis. On 16 January 2025, he renewed his contract with the club until 2027.

Moreno made his first team – and La Liga – debut on 18 May 2025, starting in a 1–0 home loss to Deportivo Alavés. On 3 January of the following year, he was loaned to Primera Federación side CE Sabadell FC until June.

On 29 July 2026, after helping the Arquelinats to achieve promotion to Segunda División, Moreno signed a permanent three-year contract with the club.
