= CE Sabadell FC =

Catalan association football club

Sabadell
- Full name: Centre d'Esports Sabadell Futbol Club, S.A.D.
- Nicknames: Arlequinats; Sabadellencs; Vallesans
- Founded: 11 December 1903; 122 years ago
- Stadium: Nova Creu Alta
- Capacity: 11,908
- Owner: Adam Rothstein
- President: Pau Morilla-Giner
- Head coach: Ferran Costa
- League: Segunda División
- 2025–26: Primera Federación – Group 2, 2nd of 20 (promoted via play-offs)
- Website: www.cesabadellfc.com
| Home colours | Away colours |

Centre d'Esports Sabadell Futbol Club, S.A.D. (Catalan pronunciation: [ˈsentɾə ðəsˈpɔɾ(ts) səβəˈðeʎ fubˈbɔl ˈklup]) is one of Spain's most historic football clubs. Based in Sabadell (close to Barcelona) and founded in 1903, its first men's team plays in the Segunda División (Spain's 2nd tier). Its first women's team is active in the Preferent Catalana, the fifth level, and its first Under 19 men's team participates in Division de Honor, Spain's top tier. The club has over 50 teams in its prestigious youth academy. The club holds home games at the Estadi de la Nova Creu Alta, which hosted football games at Barcelona Olympics.

The side has competed in national leagues since 1928, gaining its first promotion to the Segunda División in 1933 and then to La Liga in 1944. Sabadell's longest spell in the top flight was from 1965 to 1972, and their most recent one from 1986 to 1988. In total, Sabadell has played 14 seasons in the Primera División, which makes it the third Catalan club with the most seasons and points in the competition after FC Barcelona and RCD Espanyol. Moreover, the club has reached one Copa del Rey final, which they lost 3–0 to Sevilla FC in 1935. It has also played in a European competition, entering the 1969-70 Inter-Cities Fairs Cup after finishing fourth in 1968-69 La Liga.

Sabadell has always had an intense rivalry with Terrassa FC, as both clubs are the strongest sides in the comarca Vallès Occidental. The Vallès derby is fueled by the rivalry between the cities of Sabadell and Terrassa and is known as one of the most contested derbies in Catalonia.

== Symbols ==
=== Crest ===
The crest of Sabadell is formed by two elements. The first one is the coat of arms in the middle, based on the coat of arms of the city of Sabadell, which consists of two parts. The upper part contains blue and white squares, referring to the club's colours, and an onion, one of the symbols of the city. The lower part is formed by the Senyera, the flag of Catalonia. The coat of arms is surrounded at the top and the sides by a white ribbon containing the name of the club in black: Centre d'Esports Sabadell F.C. The crest has not undergone major changes since the club's foundation in 1903.

=== Hymn ===
The hymn of Sabadell is called Honor al Sabadell ("Honour to Sabadell") and replaced the hymn Sempre endavant Sabadell ("Always forward Sabadell") after the 1990–91 season. The current hymn was composed by Adolf Cabané (music) and Lluís Papell (lyrics).

The lyrics of the hymn are the following:

Cantem, cantem la joia indefinida
de veure el Sabadell entre els millors
després d'uns anys de lluita decidida
han assolit ressò nostres colors.
Alcem la copa així, ben alta
en honor del futbol de Sabadell.
Ciutat aimada que somriu i canta
donant goig i prestigi al joc més bell.
Honor al Sabadell! Honor a la Ciutat!
i visca el nostre club sempre estimat!

Cantem, cantem al Club de tanta història
forjada amb tants neguits i tants afanys.
Lluitant per assolir aquesta glòria
que ens ha portat l'esforç tants i tants anys.
Alcem la copa així, ben alta
en honor del futbol de Sabadell.
Ciutat aimada treballadora
ben units el més jove i el més vell.
Honor al Sabadell! Honor a la Ciutat!
i visca el nostre Club sempre estimat!

English translation:

Let's sing, let's sing the indefinite joy
of seeing Sabadell among the best
after some years of decided battle
our colours achieved repercussion.
Let's lift the cup like this, high enough
in honour of football from Sabadell.
Ciutat aimada, which laughs and sings,
Honour to Sabadell! Honour to the City!
And long live our always-beloved club!

Let's sing, let's sing for the club with so much history
formed by so many worries and so much eagerness.
Battling to reach this glory
that our effort has brought us for so many years.
Let's lift the cup like this, high enough
in honour of football from Sabadell.
The working ciutat aimada,
uniting the youngest and oldest well.
Honour to Sabadell! Honour to the City!
And long live our always-beloved club!

=== Kit ===
- Home kit: white and blue checkered shirt, blue shorts and blue socks
- Away kit: black shirt, black shorts, and black socks

Before playing with the typical checkered shirt, Sabadell used vertical stripes. The club changed its shirt to blue and white squares in a match against Terrassa FC in 1913.

== History ==
=== Name evolution ===
- Centre d'Esports de Sabadell (1903-1910)
- Centre d'Esports Sabadell Foot-ball Club (1910-1941)
- Centro de Deportes Sabadell Club de Fútbol (1941-1975)
- Centre d'Esports Sabadell Futbol Club (1975-1992)
- Centre d'Esports Sabadell Futbol Club, S.A.E. (1992-present)

=== History ===
==== Beginnings ====
In 1901, Joan Saus and a group of youngsters from the Sabadell Catalan Centre founded Centre d'Esports Sabadell, which became fully legalized on 5 June 1906. The club's first games were held on a grass field at Prat de Sant Oleguer but, on 3 June of that year, a stadium in the Creu Alta District was inaugurated, in a game against "Team X" from Barcelona, later known as RCD Espanyol. On 6 August 1912, the first game under floodlights in Spain was played in the same venue against Universitari, a club also from Barcelona.

==== Spanish Cup Final ====
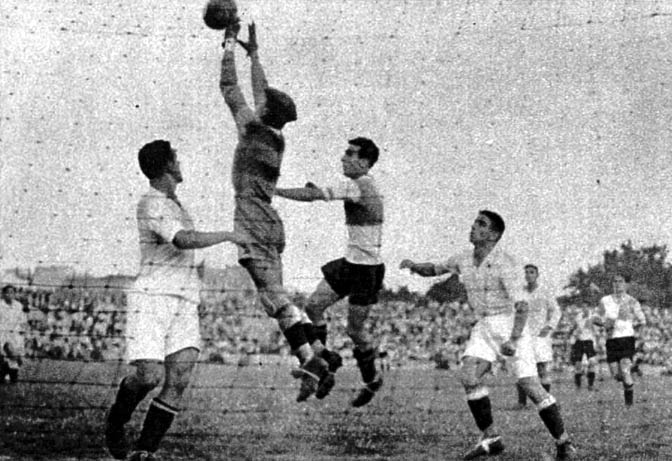
Sabadell vs Sevilla, 1935 Copa del Rey final

In 1933–34, the club won its first major trophy, the Catalan Football Championship, which allowed the winner to participate in the Copa del Presidente de la República. During the former tournament, it won 15 games and drew once, reaching the latter's final in the following season, losing 0–3 to Sevilla FC at the Chamartín Stadium.

==== First promotions to La Liga ====
Sabadell first competed in La Liga in the 1943–44 season, finishing ninth. It improved to fifth in 1946–47, ranking in front of Real Madrid and only four points behind champions Valencia CF, just one season after returning from Segunda División.

==== Fourth place and Fairs Cup participation ====
In 1968–69, Sabadell, guided by manager Pasieguito, finished a best-ever fourth as the top flight already consisted of 16 clubs. José Luis Garzón was the top scorer of the team with 9 goals. Subsequently, it competed in the Inter-Cities Fairs Cup, losing to Club Brugge K.V. of Belgium in the first round (3–5 on aggregate). Sabadell won 2–0 at home in the first leg, with Pedro Zaballa scoring the first-ever goal of the club in a European competition and Cristo adding the second in the last minutes of the game. A 5–1 defeat in Brugge, with Josep Palau scoring the away goal, ended the dream. In 1972, a seven-year run in the top division came to an end, as the Arlequinats were relegated after finishing dead last.

==== Last time in the top tier ====
On 18 May 1986, Sabadell returned to Primera División after defeating Atlético Madrileño 2–0 at home with goals from Joaquín Villa and Nacho. The team, which finished runner-up in 1985-86 Segunda División, was guided by manager Pedro Mari Uribarri and was captained by homegrown midfielder Lino Gutiérrez. The following season, the team survived in the first tier after succeeding in a dramatic relegation group in the 1986-87 La Liga managed by former goalkeeper and legend Pepe Martínez, the player with most games in Primera División in the club's history. Martínez was sacked on 2 November 1987 and was replaced by Antonio de la Cruz, who could not keep the team in the top division. Relegation to Segunda División was confirmed on 22 May 1988 after losing 2–0 in San Mamés against Athletic Club and finishing second from bottom. Four months before, in the Copa del Rey quarter-finals first-leg, Sabadell had produced one of its most famous games ever after a dramatic comeback against Real Madrid in the second half. The Spanish giants were two goals ahead at half time, but Jordi Vinyals, Josep Maria Sala and Josep Villarroya scored in the second half to seal a memorable win. In the return leg at the Estadio Santiago Bernabéu, Real Madrid won 2–0 in the extra-time.

==== 18 years outside of professional leagues ====
CE Sabadell became a public limited sports company in 1991, being relegated to Segunda División B two years later, and immediately to Tercera División following severe economic problems. After achieving promotion in 1994 with a very young team guided by manager Antonio Jaurrieta, the club spent the following seventeen years in the third level (with the exception of 2006–07 in the fourth). In that dark period, there were only three highlights, two of them with manager Pere Valentí Mora in charge: the 1999-2000 Copa Federación de España title against the reserve team of Elche CF and a third-place finish the following season which allowed the team to play in the play-offs, with hopes of promotion to the second tier ended after a home defeat against Burgos CF. The third one was another unsuccessful promotion play-off after the team finished fourth in the 2008–09 Segunda División B. This time, the dream was over after a controversial game against Real Unión de Irún. Ramón Moya, who had also been the manager in the return to Segunda B two seasons before, narrowly missed a second promotion with the club.

==== Return to second tier and Japanese takeover ====
In the 2010–11 season, Sabadell, managed by Lluís Carreras, won its group in the regular season. In the playoffs, the team drew both games against SD Eibar, but was eventually promoted on the away goals rule following the 1–1 score at the Ipurua Municipal Stadium with Marc Fernández scoring the goal, returning to the professional divisions after 18 years. Three young players who were loaned by other Catalan clubs, winger Isaac Cuenca, midfielder Juanjo Ciércoles and striker Hiroshi Ibusuki, had a big impact in the successful campaign. It was the second promotion for goalkeeper David de Navas, who signed for the club when it was in the fourth tier in 2007.

Sabadell struggled in their return to the second level finishing in 19th place, being the first side in the relegation zone. However, they were spared when Villarreal CF dropped down a division in the top flight, which led to the automatic relegation of its reserve team Villarreal CF B. Sabadell finished second level as 16th in 2012–13 season, with Carreras departing at the end of the campaign. Manu Lanzarote, who finished the league with 14 goals and 11 assists in 37 games, also left the club and was signed by RCD Espanyol. The announcement was made four months before the end of the season.

In the summer of 2013, the Japanese owners signed Sotan Tanabe and made an agreement with FC Tokyo. A pre-season tour was made in Japan, even playing a friendly against FC Tokyo in the Ajinomoto Field Nishigaoka which ended in a 2–2 draw. Businessman Keisuke Sakamoto, who had bought the club one year before, was named president on 30 July 2013 replacing Joan Soteras, who had achieved two promotions in his seven years in control of the club. The season started badly, with new manager Javi Salamero sacked in November. He was replaced by his assistant, Miquel Olmo, and the team finished the season in 10th place, the best final position in the second tier since 1992. Aníbal Zurdo scored 18 league goals and was signed by Mexican side Cruz Azul.

The following season was much more difficult, with Olmo sacked in November and his successor Álex García winning only one of his nine league games in charge. Although the team improved with the appointment of Juan Carlos Mandiá and the return of Aníbal Zurdo on loan, Sabadell finished 21st and was relegated to the third level after 4 years.

==== Back in the third tier and ownership changes ====
Sabadell had a lot of financial problems after the relegation to Segunda B. Sakamoto sold the club to Aragón-based company Viacron in 2015, with Antoni Reguant becoming president. The best sporting achievement of these years was winning the 2015-16 Copa Catalunya, defeating FC Barcelona B in the final in the Nova Creu Alta with goals from Sandro Toscano and Ernest Forgas.

Esteve Calzada, a former member of FC Barcelona board and a marketing expert, bought the club in 2017. Financial difficulties meant that from 2017 to 2019 the club was more concerned with relegation avoidance than real hopes of promotion. In August 2019, the club announced an agreement with a group of international investors (led by Pau Morilla-Giner), whereby this group would both bail out the club and achieve majority ownership through periodic capital infusions over the following three years to guarantee institutional stability and financial resources to achieve sustainable success.

==== The Hidalgo years: promotion in Marbella and relegation in Miranda ====
Former captain Antonio Hidalgo saved the club from relegation to the fourth tier after he was appointed as the new manager with seven games remaining of the season 2018-19 and led the team to promotion to Segunda División in July 2020 by beating Barcelona B 2–1 in the Segunda División B play-offs final after five-years in third division with goals from Aleix Coch and Néstor Querol.

The team was immediately relegated in the following 2020–21 season by the narrow margin of one single point after results in the last matchday were not favourable in spite of Sabadell winning 0-2 in Miranda de Ebro against CD Mirandés and joined the newly created 1a RFEF Division. Hidalgo was sacked after a poor start of the new season , and the team missed the play-offs in the last matchday after the improvement made by new manager Pedro Munitis.

==== Financial difficulties and relegation to the fourth tier ====
In June, Calzada announced that investment would be much lower in the 2022–23 season and Munitis departed the club, with former FC Barcelona player Gabri named as his replacement. He was sacked on 19 December 2022 with the team in 18th place. Assistant coach Miki Lladó, who previously had been in charge of the club's youth teams, was named manager. He led the team to a 10th-place finish in 2022–23 Primera Federación earning 32 points in his 21 games in charge and was offered a new one-year contract in the summer. Talented young players such as Pau Víctor, Sergi Altimira and Álex Sala contributed to survival.

Before the beginning of the 2023-24 season, Chairman Esteve Calzada resigned and was replaced on 12 June 2023 by board member Pau Morilla-Giner. The new season started badly and Lladó was sacked on 10 October 2023 after collecting only seven points in the first seven league games of the 2023–24 season. He was replaced by his assistant Gerard Bofill, who could not achieve a single point in six games and was fired with the team in the bottom of the table. The team improved with the signing of manager Óscar Cano and sporting director Carlos Rosende, but was relegated to Segunda Federacion after failing to win the last game away against CD Lugo on 25 May 2024.

==== Rothstein takeover and back-to-back promotions ====
Some weeks before the end of the 2023-24 season, Chairman Morilla-Giner found a new ownership group led by venture capitalist Adam Rothstein. Despite the relegation, Rothstein stayed loyal to his word and the club was able to form a competitive team to try to go back to Primera Federación.

At the end of the 2024–25 season, the team, guided by manager David Movilla, achieved promotion to Primera RFEF via a successful playoff run defeating SD Eibar B in the semifinal and UCAM Murcia CF in the final after finishing fourth in the league. Movilla had replaced the sacked David Català on 20 January 2025. Youngster Javi Morcillo played a key role in the second half of the season before he was sold to Atlético de Madrid in the summer.

Despite achieving promotion, Movilla's contract was not extended and on 23 June 2025 Ferran Costa was appointed manager of the team signing a two-year contract. He guided the team to a second-place finish in the 2025-26 Primera Federación, entering the promotion play-offs. In the semi-final, Sabadell defeated Real Madrid Castilla after a comeback in the return leg at home: having lost the first leg 2-0, two goals from Joel Priego and one from David Astals in front of a sold-out Nova Creu Alta stadium gave the team a 3-0 win. In the final, after a 1-0 defeat away, promotion to La Liga Hypermotion was achieved on 19 June 2026 after a 4-0 win against Zamora CF thanks to goals from Javi López-Pinto, Eneko Aguilar, Quadri Liameed and Xavi Moreno. It was the second promotion in the two full seasons with Adam Rothstein as owner and with Lucas Viale as sporting director. It was also the second promotion to the second tier for Morilla-Giner, the first one in Marbella as a board member and investor and this second one as president.

After a promising draw away at Sporting de Gijón in the first matchday of the new season in LaLiga2, CE Sabadell announced on 19 August 2026 that Argentinian businessman Antonio Neri had joined the group of investors and would become a new board member. On 2 September, the club won its second Copa Catalunya after defeating Barcelona Atlètic 2-1 in the final thanks to goals from Nicholas Gioacchini and Yanis Rahmani.

== Season to season ==
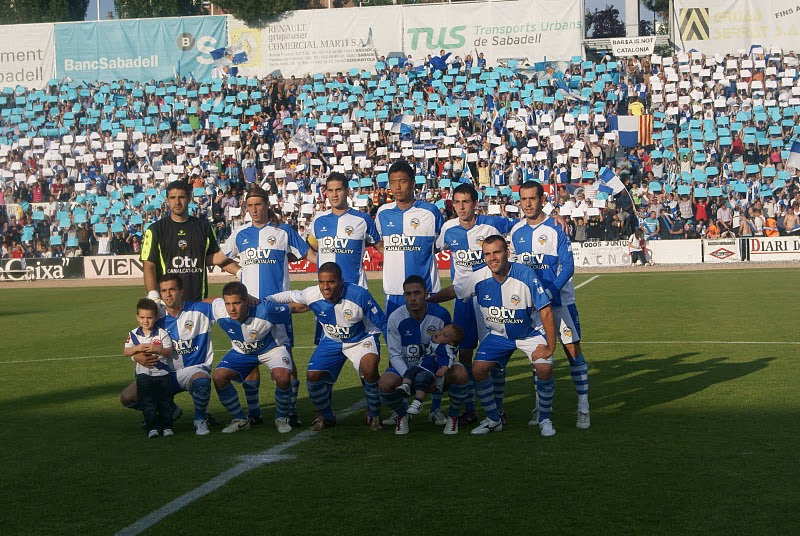
Sabadell before game against Eibar (2010)

| Season | Tier | Division | Place | Copa del Rey |
|---|---|---|---|---|
| 1930–31 | 3 | 3ª | 2nd | Second round |
| 1931–32 | 3 | 3ª | 1st | |
| 1932–33 | 3 | 3ª | 2nd | |
| 1933–34 | 2 | 2ª | 9th | First round |
| 1934–35 | 2 | 2ª | 2nd | Runner-up |
| 1935–36 | 2 | 2ª | 5th | |
| 1939–40 | 2 | 2ª | 2nd | |
| 1940–41 | 2 | 2ª | 9th | First round |
| 1941–42 | 2 | 2ª | 1st | First round |
| 1942–43 | 2 | 2ª | 2nd | First round |
| 1943–44 | 1 | 1ª | 9th | Quarter-finals |
| 1944–45 | 1 | 1ª | 13th | First round |
| 1945–46 | 2 | 2ª | 1st | First round |
| 1946–47 | 1 | 1ª | 5th | Quarter-finals |
| 1947–48 | 1 | 1ª | 12th | Sixth round |
| 1948–49 | 1 | 1ª | 14th | Fourth round |
| 1949–50 | 2 | 2ª | 6th | Second round |
| 1950–51 | 2 | 2ª | 3rd | |
| 1951–52 | 2 | 2ª | 4th | |
| 1952–53 | 2 | 2ª | 11th | First round |

| Season | Tier | Division | Place | Copa del Rey |
|---|---|---|---|---|
| 1953–54 | 2 | 2ª | 6th | |
| 1954–55 | 2 | 2ª | 10th | |
| 1955–56 | 2 | 2ª | 5th | |
| 1956–57 | 2 | 2ª | 2nd | |
| 1957–58 | 2 | 2ª | 2nd | |
| 1958–59 | 2 | 2ª | 2nd | First round |
| 1959–60 | 2 | 2ª | 7th | Second round |
| 1960–61 | 2 | 2ª | 6th | First round |
| 1961–62 | 2 | 2ª | 8th | Second round |
| 1962–63 | 2 | 2ª | 16th | First round |
| 1963–64 | 3 | 3ª | 1st | |
| 1964–65 | 2 | 2ª | 2nd | First round |
| 1965–66 | 1 | 1ª | 14th | Quarter-finals |
| 1966–67 | 1 | 1ª | 8th | Second round |
| 1967–68 | 1 | 1ª | 12th | Second round |
| 1968–69 | 1 | 1ª | 4th | First round |
| 1969–70 | 1 | 1ª | 13th | Quarter-finals |
| 1970–71 | 1 | 1ª | 13th | Fifth round |
| 1971–72 | 1 | 1ª | 18th | Fourth round |
| 1972–73 | 2 | 2ª | 12th | Fifth round |

| Season | Tier | Division | Place | Copa del Rey |
|---|---|---|---|---|
| 1973–74 | 2 | 2ª | 15th | Round of 16 |
| 1974–75 | 2 | 2ª | 19th | Fourth round |
| 1975–76 | 3 | 3ª | 6th | Second round |
| 1976–77 | 3 | 3ª | 1st | First round |
| 1977–78 | 2 | 2ª | 6th | Fourth round |
| 1978–79 | 2 | 2ª | 12th | First round |
| 1979–80 | 2 | 2ª | 6th | Fourth round |
| 1980–81 | 2 | 2ª | 7th | Second round |
| 1981–82 | 2 | 2ª | 11th | Second round |
| 1982–83 | 2 | 2ª | 18th | Second round |
| 1983–84 | 3 | 2ª B | 1st | Fourth round |
| 1984–85 | 2 | 2ª | 4th | Round of 16 |
| 1985–86 | 2 | 2ª | 2nd | Quarter-finals |
| 1986–87 | 1 | 1ª | 15th | Third round |
| 1987–88 | 1 | 1ª | 19th | Quarter-finals |
| 1988–89 | 2 | 2ª | 13th | Fourth round |
| 1989–90 | 2 | 2ª | 7th | Round of 16 |
| 1990–91 | 2 | 2ª | 12th | Fourth round |
| 1991–92 | 2 | 2ª | 9th | Fourth round |
| 1992–93 | 2 | 2ª | 20th | Fifth round |

| Season | Tier | Division | Place | Copa del Rey |
|---|---|---|---|---|
| 1993–94 | 4 | 3ª | 1st | First round |
| 1994–95 | 3 | 2ª B | 11th | Second round |
| 1995–96 | 3 | 2ª B | 16th | DNP |
| 1996–97 | 3 | 2ª B | 11th | DNP |
| 1997–98 | 3 | 2ª B | 11th | DNP |
| 1998–99 | 3 | 2ª B | 7th | DNP |
| 1999–2000 | 3 | 2ª B | 13th | DNP |
| 2000–01 | 3 | 2ª B | 3rd | DNP |
| 2001–02 | 3 | 2ª B | 14th | Preliminary |
| 2002–03 | 3 | 2ª B | 7th | DNP |
| 2003–04 | 3 | 2ª B | 16th | Round of 64 |
| 2004–05 | 3 | 2ª B | 13th | DNP |
| 2005–06 | 3 | 2ª B | 18th | DNP |
| 2006–07 | 4 | 3ª | 3rd | DNP |
| 2007–08 | 3 | 2ª B | 14th | DNP |
| 2008–09 | 3 | 2ª B | 4th | DNP |
| 2009–10 | 3 | 2ª B | 10th | Second round |
| 2010–11 | 3 | 2ª B | 1st | DNP |
| 2011–12 | 2 | 2ª | 19th | Second round |
| 2012–13 | 2 | 2ª | 16th | Third round |

| Season | Tier | Division | Place | Copa del Rey |
|---|---|---|---|---|
| 2013–14 | 2 | 2ª | 10th | Second round |
| 2014–15 | 2 | 2ª | 21st | Round of 32 |
| 2015–16 | 3 | 2ª B | 7th | First round |
| 2016–17 | 3 | 2ª B | 15th | DNP |
| 2017–18 | 3 | 2ª B | 12th | DNP |
| 2018–19 | 3 | 2ª B | 12th | DNP |
| 2019–20 | 3 | 2ª B | 3rd | DNP |
| 2020–21 | 2 | 2ª | 19th | Second round |
| 2021–22 | 3 | 1ª RFEF | 8th | First round |
| 2022–23 | 3 | 1ª Fed. | 10th | DNP |
| 2023–24 | 3 | 1ª Fed. | 16th | DNP |
| 2024–25 | 4 | 2ª Fed. | 4th | DNP |
| 2025–26 | 3 | 1ª Fed. | 2nd | Second round |
| 2026–27 | 2 | 2ª | | |

- 14 seasons in La Liga
- 45 seasons in Segunda División
- 4 seasons in Primera Federación/Primera División RFEF
- 22 seasons in Segunda División B
- 1 season in Segunda Federación
- 8 seasons in Tercera División

=== European record ===
| Season | Competition | Round | Country | Club | Score |
|---|---|---|---|---|---|
| 1969–70 | Inter-Cities Fairs Cup | 1st | (Belgium) | Club Brugge | 2–0, 1–5 |

== Players ==
=== First-team squad ===
As of 14 September 2026.

Note: Flags indicate national team as defined under FIFA eligibility rules; some limited exceptions apply. Players may hold more than one non-FIFA nationality.

| No. | Pos. | Nation | Player |
|---|---|---|---|
| 1 | GK | ESP | Diego Fuoli |
| 2 | DF | ESP | Pipa |
| 3 | DF | ESP | Genar Fornés |
| 4 | DF | ESP | Miki Codina |
| 5 | MF | BRA | Arthur Bonaldo |
| 6 | DF | ESP | Edgar González (on loan from Almería) |
| 7 | FW | ESP | Ton Ripoll |
| 8 | MF | ESP | Pere Pons |
| 9 | FW | RUS | Nikolay Obolskiy |
| 10 | FW | ESP | Ángel Baena |
| 11 | FW | ESP | Javi López-Pinto |
| 12 | FW | URU | Gastón Valles |
| 13 | GK | ESP | José Ortega |
| 14 | MF | ESP | Óscar Sanz |

| No. | Pos. | Nation | Player |
|---|---|---|---|
| 15 | DF | ESP | Kaiser |
| 16 | FW | USA | Nicholas Gioacchini |
| 18 | MF | GHA | Yussif Owusu |
| 19 | FW | FRA | Yanis Rahmani |
| 20 | MF | ESP | Urri (captain) |
| 21 | MF | ESP | Alain Ribeiro |
| 22 | MF | NGR | Quadri Liameed |
| 23 | MF | ESP | Joel Priego |
| 24 | MF | ESP | Eneko Aguilar |
| 25 | GK | ESP | Marc Vidal |
| 27 | DF | ESP | José Luis Catalá |
| 29 | MF | ITA | Patrick Nuamah (on loan from Sassuolo) |
| 30 | MF | ESP | Xavi Moreno |

=== Youth players ===
Note: Flags indicate national team as defined under FIFA eligibility rules; some limited exceptions apply. Players may hold more than one non-FIFA nationality.

| No. | Pos. | Nation | Player |
|---|---|---|---|
| 31 | GK | ESP | Manel Estévez |
| 32 | DF | ESP | Roger Farrerons |
| 33 | FW | ESP | Quim Utgés |

| No. | Pos. | Nation | Player |
|---|---|---|---|
| 37 | MF | ESP | Samu Bauló |
| 40 | FW | ESP | Fran Rivera |

=== Out on loan ===
Note: Flags indicate national team as defined under FIFA eligibility rules; some limited exceptions apply. Players may hold more than one non-FIFA nationality.

| No. | Pos. | Nation | Player |
|---|---|---|---|
| — | FW | ESP | Miguelete (at UD Logroñés until 30 June 2027) |

== Honours ==
=== National competitions ===
- Copa del Rey
  - Runners-up (1): 1935
- Copa Federación de España
  - Winners (1): 1999–2000
- Segunda División
  - Winners (2): 1942–43, 1945–46
- Segunda División B
  - Winners (2): 1983–84, 2010–11
- Tercera División
  - Winners (4): 1931–32, 1963–64, 1976–77, 1993–94
- Copa Mediterráneo
  - Winners (1): 1944
- Campeonato de España de Segunda Categoría
  - Winners (1): 1913

=== Regional competitions ===
- Primera Categoria del Campionat de Catalunya
  - Winners (1): 1933–34
- Segunda Categoria del Campionat de Catalunya
  - Winners (3): 1912–13, 1913–14, 1929–30
- Copa Catalunya
  - Winners (2): 2015–16, 2025-26

=== Friendly competitions ===
- Torneig Nostra Catalunya
  - Winners (4): 1978, 1979, 1988, 1989

== Former players ==
=== Most appearances in La Liga ===
- (Spain) Pepe Martinez: 151
- (Spain) Isidro Sánchez: 142
- (Spain) Ramón Montesinos: 142
- (Spain) Ramón Marañón: 140
- (Uruguay) Mario Pini: 138
- (Spain) Josep Palau: 115
- (Spain) Joaquín Navarro: 103
- (Spain) Lluís Múñoz: 100
- (Spain) Antonio Vázquez: 92
- (Spain) Alberto Arnal: 86
- (Spain) Manuel Pallas: 85
- (Spain) Ricard Pujol: 81

=== Most goals in La Liga ===
- (Spain) Antonio Vázquez: 35
- (Spain) Manuel Pallas: 27
- (Spain) Josep Palau: 26
- (Spain) Antonio Sangrador: 23
- (Spain) Juan del Pino: 24
- (Spain) José Luis Garzón Sr.: 21
- (Spain) Josep Antoni Noya: 15
- (Spain) Josep María Vall: 15
- (Spain) Ramón Marañon: 15
- (Spain) Juli Gonzalvo : 14
- (Spain) Benjamín Telechea: 12
- (Spain) Periko Alonso: 12

== Former coaches ==
- 1912–1912: (Spain) Pepe Rodríguez
- 1924–1925: (England) Bernard Travers
- 1933–1935: (Spain) Joan Tena
- 1941–1942: (Spain) José Luis Zabala
- 1942–1943: (Spain) Joan Armet Kinké
- 1943–1945: (Spain) Pere Solé
- 1945–1947: (Spain) Vicenç Gràcia
- 1947–1948: (Spain) Antoni Sangüesa
- 1948–1948: (Spain) Emili Vidal
- 1949–1950: (Spain) Josep Argemí
- 1950–1950: (Spain) Vicenç Gràcia
- 1950–1951: (Spain) Amadeu Navarra
- 1951–1952: (Spain) Josep Escolà
- 1952–1952: (Spain) Vicenç Gràcia
- 1952–1953: (Spain) Lluís Miró
- 1953–1953: (Spain) Antoni Sangüesa
- 1953–1955: (Croatia) Zvonimir Monsider
- 1955–1956: (Spain) Vicenç Gràcia
- 1956–1958: (Spain) Juanito Ochoa
- 1958–1958: (Hungary) Elemér Berkessy
- 1958–1959: (Spain) Juan Zambudio Velasco
- 1959–1959: (Spain) Patrocinio Ramon Patro
- 1960–1960: (Spain) Juan Zambudio Velasco
- 1960–1961: (Romania) Nicolae Simatoc
- 1961–1961: (Spain) Vicenç Gràcia
- 1961–1961: (Spain) Ernest Pons
- 1961–1962: (Spain) Antoni Sangüesa
- 1962–1962: (Spain) Juan Casariego
- 1962–1964: (Spain) Juan Ramón Santiago
- 1964–1972: (Spain) Bernardino Pérez Pasieguito
- 1972–1972: (Spain) Enrique Orizaola
- 1972–1974: (Spain) Antonio Jaurrieta
- 1974–1974: (Brazil) Otto Bumbel
- 1974–1974: (Spain) Albert Arnal
- 1974–1975: (Spain) Gustau Biosca
- 1975–1976: (Spain) Antonio Jaurrieta
- 1976–1980: (Spain) Pepe Martínez
- 1980–1981: (Spain) José Luis Romero
- 1981–1982: (Spain) Manuel Polinario Poli
- 1982–1983: (Spain) Julià Garcia
- 1983–1983: (Spain) Antonio Jaurrieta
- 1983–1984: (Spain) Salvador Cadena
- 1984–1984: (Spain) Vicenç Dauder
- 1984–1985: (Spain) Bernardino Pérez Pasieguito
- 1985–1987: (Spain) Pedro Mari Uribarri
- 1987–1988: (Spain) Pepe Martínez
- 1988–1988: (Spain) Toño de la Cruz
- 1988–1989: (Spain) José Luis Romero
- 1989–1990: (Spain) Lluís Pujol
- 1990–1991: (Spain) José Antonio Naya
- 1991–1991: (Spain) Julià Garcia
- 1991–1991: (Spain) Luis García Luiche
- 1991–1992: (Spain) Antoni Olmo
- 1992–1992: (Spain) Pepe Martínez
- 1992–1993: (Spain) Pedro Mari Uribarri
- 1993–1994: (Spain) Antonio Jaurrieta
- 1994–1995: (Spain) José Luis Romero
- 1995–1999: (Spain) Paco Garcia Llamas
- 1999–1999: (Spain) Pedro Mari Uribarri
- 1999–1999: (Spain) Luis Miguel Gail
- 1999–2002: (Spain) Pere Valentí Mora
- 2002–2004: (Spain) Roberto Elvira
- 2004–2005: (Spain) Joan Francesc Ferrer Rubi
- 2005–2005: (Spain) Pere Valentí Mora
- 2005–2006: (Spain) José Luis Montes
- 2006–2006: (Spain) Jaume Bonet
- 2006–2006: (Spain) Manolo Fernández
- 2006–2009: (Spain) Ramon Moya
- 2009–2010: (Spain) David Pirri
- 2010–2013: (Spain) Lluís Carreras
- 2013–2013: (Spain) Javi Salamero
- 2013–2014: (Spain) Miquel Olmo
- 2014–2015: (Spain) Álex García
- 2015–2015: (Spain) Juan Carlos Mandiá
- 2015–2016: (Spain) Miguel Álvarez Jurado
- 2016–2017: (Spain) José Solivelles
- 2017: (Spain) Guillermo Fernández Romo
- 2017–2019: (Spain) Toni Seligrat
- 2019-2019: (Spain) Kiko Ramírez
- 2019-2021: (Spain) Antonio Hidalgo
- 2021–2022: (Spain) Pedro Munitis
- 2022–2022: (Spain) Gabri
- 2022–2023: (Spain) Miki Lladó
- 2023: (Spain) Gerard Bofill
- 2023–2024: (Spain) Óscar Cano
- 2024–2025: (Spain) David Català
- 2025–2025: (Spain) David Movilla
- 2025–: (Spain) Ferran Costa

== Club Presidents ==
- Joan Grau (1906–1910)
- Felip Davi (1910–1911)
- Joan Saus (1911–1923)
- Emili Moragas (1923–1929)
- Valentí Gorina (1929–1930)
- Antoni Tamburini (1930–1933)
- Josep Maria Marcet (1933–1934)
- Josep Bofarull (1934–1935)
- Josep Maria Marcet (1935–1939)
- Antoni Tamburini (1939)
- Josep Maria Marcet (1939–1942)
- Pau Maria Llonch (1945–1946)
- Miquel Sala (1946–1949)
- Pau Maria Llonch (1949–1951)
- Josep Maria Marcet (1951–1952)
- Pere Fontanet (1952)
- Josep Maria Marcet (1952–1953)
- Joan Ricart (1953–1955)
- Ricard Rosson (1955–1958)
- Antoni Altarriba (1958–1961)
- Ramiro Fernández (1961–1963)
- Josep Bargalló (1963)
- Antoni Llonch (1963–1965)
- Ricard Rosson (1965–1973)
- Francesc Marlasca (1973–1974)
- Joaquim Hors (1974–1975)
- Francesc Valldeperas (1975–1983)
- Rafael Arroyos (1983–1987)
- Alfred Besonias (1987–1991)
- Josep Miquel Sanmiquel (1991)
- Rafael Arroyos (1991–1993)
- Francesc Soldevilla (1993–1994)
- Joan Soteras (1994–1996)
- Eugeni Sánchez (1996)
- Joan Puig (1996)
- Miquel Arroyos (1996–2002)
- Francisco González Cano (2002–2004)
- Josep Manel Piedrafita (2004–2005)
- Antonio Larrosa (2005–2006)
- Joan Soteras (2006–2013)
- Keisuke Sakamoto (2013–2015)
- Antoni Reguant (2015–2018)
- Esteve Calzada (2018–2023)
- Pau Morilla-Giner (2023–present)

== Stadium ==
Sabadell plays home games at Estadi de la Nova Creu Alta. Inaugurated on 20 August 1967 with a 1–0 win against FC Barcelona, it has a capacity of 11,908 spectators.

== Supporters ==
The club has multiple supporter groups. Most groups have activities related to the social life of the members. For example, THE WALKING ARLEKIN CLUB has walking excursions during the season, usually before matches. There are also groups like Honor 1903, La Força Arlequinada and Supporters Gol Nord, that focus more on the encouragement of the team, before, during and after the matches. Most of those groups usually concentrate in the northern stand at the Nova Creu Alta.

The club used to have a fan club called Hooligans Vallès. They used to be a far right-wing group which was established in 1993. In 2011, the group was disbanded as an official supporter group. In 2016, an unofficial Hebrew supporter group was created, under the name CE Sabadell Hebreu - סבאדל בעברית. The group provides news about the club in its Facebook and Twitter pages, for Israeli and other Hebrew-speaking fans.

The fans have good relations with Bristol Rovers, which initially began due to several Rovers fans noticing that the local club had the same colours. They also have a friendship with Gerunda Sud of Girona FC, and rivalries with Desperdicis of UE Sant Andreu, Penya Sport of Palamos CF and Rudes Lleida of Lleida Esportiu.

== See also ==
- CE Sabadell FC (women)
- CE Sabadell FC B
- Nova Creu Alta

== Bibliography ==
- Fité, Joaquim (2011). Centre d'Esports Sabadell. El club de mi vida [Centre d'Esports Sabadell. The club of my life] (in Spanish). Sabadell: Centre d'Esports Sabadell Futbol Club. DL B 22588-2011.
- Padilla, Toni (2024). Mala Piel [Bad Skin]. Hooligans Ilustrados (in Spanish). Madrid: Libros del K.O. ISBN 978-84-19119-58-2. DL M 4147-2024.
