= Joel Priego =

Spanish footballer

Personal information
- Full name: Joel Priego Borrego
- Date of birth: 1 April 1999 (age 27)
- Place of birth: Manresa, Spain
- Height: 1.73 m (5 ft 8 in)
- Position: Winger

Team information
- Current team: Sabadell
- Number: 23

Youth career
- 2004–2018: Gimnàstic Manresa

Senior career*
Years	Team	Apps	(Gls)
2018–2019	Pobla Mafumet	0	(0)
2018–2019	Manresa	33	(4)
2019–2021	Girona B	43	(6)
2021–2022	Terrassa	31	(3)
2022–2023	Manresa	29	(4)
2023–2025	Zamora	60	(6)
2025–	Sabadell	42	(5)
- * Club domestic league appearances and goals as of 28 September 2026

Joel Priego Borrego (born 1 April 1999) is a Spanish professional footballer who plays as a winger for Segunda División club CE Sabadell FC.

== Career ==
Born in Manresa, Barcelona, Catalonia, Priego finished his formwation with hometown side Club Gimnàstic de Manresa, having spent 14 seasons at the club. In July 2018, he agreed to a deal with Gimnàstic de Tarragona, being assigned to farm team CF Pobla de Mafumet, but after spending the entire pre-season with the club, he left for Primera Catalana side CE Manresa in September.

On 19 June 2019, after helping Manresa to achieve promotion to Tercera División, Priego and teammate Noah Baffoe moved to Girona FC's B-team. On 21 July 2021, he signed for Segunda División RFEF side Terrassa FC.

On 11 June 2022, Priego returned to Manresa, with the club now also in the fourth division, after refusing Terrassa's renewal offer. On 20 July of the following year, he left his native region to sign for Zamora CF of the same category, and helped the side to achieve promotion to Primera Federación in his first year.

On 3 July 2025, Priego was announced at CE Sabadell FC in division three. A regular starter during the season, he scored seven goals in 41 appearances overall – including a brace against Real Madrid Castilla in the semi-finals of the promotion play-offs – as the club achieved promotion to Segunda División.

Priego made his professional debut at the age of 27 on 17 August 2026, starting in a 0–0 away draw against Sporting de Gijón.
