= 2024–25 Copa Catalunya =

Catalonia Cup

Final positions
- Champions: Girona FC
- Runners-up: RCD Espanyol

Tournament statistics
- Matches played: 61
- Goals scored: 201 (3.3 per match)

The 2024–25 Copa Catalunya was the 34th staging of the Copa Catalunya. The competition began on 31 August 2024 with a new and expanded format and was played by teams in La Liga, Segunda División, Primera RFEF, Segunda RFEF, Tercera RFEF and the top teams of Lliga Elit, Primera Catalana, Segona Catalana, Tercera Catalana and Quarta Catalana. After not being included in the last editions, FC Barcelona, Girona FC and RCD Espanyol took part again, entering in the semifinals. FC Andorra, who were the defending champions after defeating UE Olot in the final the season before, were eliminated in the semifinals by eventual winners Girona. It was the first ever title of the competition for Girona FC, who lifted the cup after defeating RCD Espanyol in the final in the Nova Creu Alta in Sabadell on 23 July 2025.

== First round ==
The winners of each group of 2023-24 season in Tercera Catalana and Quarta Catalana entered this round. Games were played between 31 August 2024 and 4 September 2024.

Team 1	Score	Team 2
CF Verdú-Cercavins	0–3	CF Tremp
CE La Salle Bonanova	2–2 (3–0 p)	UD Marianao Poblet B
At. Balenyà	1–3	UD Taradell
CF Caldes Montbui B	1–0	EF Barberà Andalucía
UE Fornells B	1–3	Vilablareix FC
CD Cervelló	1–3	CF Pallejà
Inter Barcelona	2–0	CF Barceloneta
CE Bigues	3–2	CF Parets B
UE Sants B	0–0 (3–4 p)	CE APA Poble Sec
UD San Salvador	3–0	CA Bonavista
AD EFB Ripollet	1–2	Escola Pia Terrassa
AE Pare Manyanet	1–0	CD Ginestar
AE Young Talent Badalona Sud	0–3	CF Lloreda
Base Vilobí 2015 CF	2–2 (4–2 p)	UE Cantonigros
CE Castellbell i Vilar	2–1	FC Artés
CF Camallera	0–4	CF Esplais
CD Montcada B	2–1	CD Sant Genís-Penitentes B
FC Hortonenc	2–4	Roda de Barà At.
CD Premià Dalt	0–3	CE Premià B
CF Miralcamp	0-1	At. Almacelles
Penya Esportiva Montagut	2–4	CE Abadessenc
CF Olesa	2–2 (3–4 p)	FC Fátima

== Second round ==
The winners of each group of 2023-24 season in Segona Catalana entered the competition in this round. Games were played between 7 and 8 September 2024. CF Balaguer, winners of the 2000-2001 edition of the tournament after defeating FC Barcelona in the final, entered the competition in this round.

Team 1	Score	Team 2
CE Premià B	1–1 (5–4 p)	CF Lloreda
CE Bigues	0-2	UD Taradell
UD San Salvador	3-3 (1–3 p)	At. Roda de Barà
AD Sauleda	3-3 (4-5 p)	FC Juventus-Lloret
CE La Salle Bonanova	0-4	CF Pallejà
Escola Pia Terrassa	0-2	CN Terrassa
CF Caldes Montbui B	0-4	UE Sabadellenca
CF Tremp	1–6	CF Balaguer
AE Pare Manyanet	2–1	At. Almacelles
FC Fátima	0-0 (6-7 p)	CF Ciudad Cooperativa
Base Vilobí 2015 CF	3–1	CE Abadessenc
Inter Barcelona	4–2	CE APA Poble Sec
CF Montcada B	0–2	CF Singuerlín
CF Amposta	1-1 (5-6 p)	CF La Sénia
CE Castellbell i Vilar	1–2	CF Cardona
CF Esplais	3-0	Vilablareix FC

== Third round ==
The winners of each group of 2023-24 season in Primera Catalana and the best team in 2023-24 Lliga Elit which not achieved promotion, UE Vic, entered the competition in this round. Games were played between 14 and 15 September 2024.

Team 1	Score	Team 2
CE Premià B	0–6	CF Singuerlín
CF Pallejà	1-0	UD San Mauro
UD Taradell	1-4	AEC Manlleu
CF Cardona	2-1	CF Balaguer
UE Sabadellenca	2-1	CN Terrassa
Inter Barcelona	3-2	CF Ciudad Cooperativa
At. Roda de Barà	0-0 (4-2 p)	CF Vilanova
AE Pare Manyanet	0–4	CF La Sénia
Base Vilobí 2015 CF	0–6	UE Vic
CF Esplais	0-2	FC Juventus-Lloret

== Fourth round ==
All sixteen non-reserve teams which played in the Catalan group of 2023-24 Tercera Federación entered the competition in this round, including former champions CE L'Hospitalet. Games were played between 2 and 16 October 2024.

Team 1	Score	Team 2
CF Peralada	1–3	UE Tona
At. Roda de Barà	2-2 (4-2 p)	CE L'Hospitalet
CP San Cristóbal	2-1	FC L'Escala
CF Pallejà	2-3	FC Vilafranca
UE Castelldefels	2-1	Reus FC Reddis
CF La Sénia	1-0	UE Rapitenca
CF Badalona	1-0	FC Juventus-Lloret
CF Singuerlín	1-1 (2-4 p)	UE Olot
UE Sabadellenca	1–4	FE Grama
Inter Barcelona	2–4	CFJ Mollerussa
CF Cardona	1-1 (2-4 p)	AE Prat
AEC Manlleu	1-0	CF Montañesa
UE Vic	1-1 (9-8 p)	UE Vilassar de Mar

== Fifth round ==
All six non-reserve Catalan teams which played in the 2023-24 Segunda Federación entered the competition in this round, including former champions CE Europa, UE Sant Andreu and Terrassa FC. Games were played between 6 and 20 November 2024.

Team 1	Score	Team 2
CF Badalona	3-3 (3-5 p)	CE Europa
UE Tona	2-1	UE Olot
FE Grama	1-4	Cerdanyola del Vallès FC
UE Vic	1-2	UE Sant Andreu
FC Vilafranca	2-2 (6-7 p)	CFJ Mollerussa
UE Castelldefels	2-2 (4-2 p)	CP San Cristóbal
CF La Sénia	0–3	Terrassa FC
AEC Manlleu	0–1	CF Badalona Futur
AE Prat	1-1 (5-6 p)	Lleida CF
At. Roda de Barà	1-1 (3-1 p)	CE Manresa

== Sixth Round ==
No new teams entered the competition in this round. Games were played between 20 and 27 November 2024.

Team 1	Score	Team 2
UE Tona	2-0	CF Badalona Futur
CFJ Mollerussa	1-1 (1-3 p)	Terrassa FC
Cerdanyola del Vallès FC	1-0	UE Sant Andreu
At. Roda de Barà	0-2	Lleida CF
UE Castelldefels	2-3	CE Europa

== Seventh Round ==
All 3 non-reserve Catalan teams which played in the 2023–24 Primera Federación entered the competition in this round, including Club Gimnàstic de Tarragona, CE Sabadell FC and UE Cornellà. Games were played between 17 and 18 December 2024.

Team 1	Score	Team 2
Terrassa FC	3-1	CE Europa
UE Tona	1-1 (3-5 p)	Gimnàstic de Tarragona
Cerdanyola del Vallès FC	2-2 (5-3 p)	UE Cornellà
Lleida CF	0-2	CE Sabadell FC

== Round of 16 ==
No new teams entered the competition in this round. Games were played on 15 January 2025.

Team 1	Score	Team 2
Cerdanyola del Vallès FC	0–4	Gimnàstic de Tarragona
Terrassa FC	1–2	CE Sabadell FC

== Quarter-finals ==
Both Catalan teams which played in the 2023–24 Segunda División entered the competition in this round, including FC Andorra and RCD Espanyol. Games were played on 29 January 2025.

Team 1	Score	Team 2
CE Sabadell FC	0–1	RCD Espanyol
Gimnàstic de Tarragona	0–2	FC Andorra

== Semi-finals ==
Both Catalan teams which played in the 2023–24 La Liga entered the competition in this round, including Girona FC and FC Barcelona. The games are scheduled to be on 19 March 2025.

Team 1	Score	Team 2
RCD Espanyol	5–0	FC Barcelona
FC Andorra	2–3	Girona FC

== Final ==
The final was played on 23 July 2025 in Sabadell as a part of preseason. Girona CF won on penalties after a goalless draw and achieved their first Copa Catalunya title after being defeated in their two previous finals in 2015 and 2017. It was their second regional title after winning the Supercopa de Catalunya in 2019, also in the Nova Creu Alta in Sabadell.

Team 1	Score	Team 2
RCD Espanyol	0–0 (4–5 p)	Girona FC
