= 2019–20 Copa Catalunya =

Catalonia Cup

Tournament details
- Teams: 30

Final positions
- Champions: L'Hospitalet
- Runners-up: Llagostera

Tournament statistics
- Matches played: 29
- Goals scored: 53 (1.83 per match)
- Top goal scorer(s): Hugo Esteban (3 goals)

The 2019–20 Copa Catalunya was the 31st staging of the Copa Catalunya. The competition began on 4 August 2019 and was played by teams in Segunda División, Segunda División B, Tercera División and the top teams of Primera Catalana.

== Qualified teams ==
The following teams competed in the 2019–20 Copa Catalunya.

1 team of 2018–19 Segunda División

- Gimnàstic

8 teams of 2018–19 Segunda División B

- Badalona
- Barcelona B
- Cornellà
- Espanyol B
- Lleida Esportiu
- Olot
- Peralada
- Sabadell

19 teams of 2018–19 Tercera División

- Ascó
- Castelldefels
- Cerdanyola
- Europa
- Figueres
- Grama
- Granollers
- Horta
- L'Hospitalet
- Llagostera
- Martinenc
- Prat
- San Cristóbal
- Sant Andreu
- Santboià
- Santfeliuenc
- Sants
- Terrassa
- Vilafranca

2 teams of 2018–19 Primera Catalana

- Andorra
- Vilassar de Mar

== Tournament ==
The draw of three first rounds took place on 2 July 2019 at Catalan Football Federation headquarters, in Barcelona. 29 teams entered the draw (all except Gimnàstic). Prat received a bye for the first round and the winner of Horta-Olot game for the second round.

=== First round ===
Games played on 2, 3, 4, 6 and 7 August 2019.

Team 1	Score	Team 2
Horta	3–1	Olot
Grama	0–0 (3–0 p)	Figueres
Sants	1–1 (6–7 p)	Badalona
Europa	1–1 (2–4 p)	Llagostera
Sant Andreu	0–0 (8–7 p)	Peralada
Vilassar de Mar	1–0	Granollers
Martinenc	0–3	Espanyol B
Ascó	0–2	Sabadell
San Cristóbal	0–0 (6–7 p)	Santfeliuenc
L'Hospitalet	0–0 (4–3 p)	Barcelona B
Castelldefels	2–0	Santboià
Cerdanyola	1–3	Lleida Esportiu
Andorra	2–1	Terrassa
Vilafranca	0–0 (4–5 p)	Cornellà

=== Second round ===
Games played on 10 and 11 August 2019.

Team 1	Score	Team 2
Grama	1–1 (4–5 p)	Badalona
Llagostera	1–0	Sant Andreu
Vilassar de Mar	1–0	Espanyol B
Santfeliuenc	1–1 (6–5 p)	Sabadell
L'Hospitalet	5–0	Castelldefels
Andorra	1–0	Lleida Esportiu
Prat	1–1 (4–1 p)	Cornellà

=== Third round ===
Games played on 17 and 18 August 2019.

Team 1	Score	Team 2
Horta	0–2	Badalona
Vilassar de Mar	1–2	Llagostera
Santfeliuenc	0–1	L'Hospitalet
Andorra	0–1	Prat

=== Fourth round ===
Game played on 30 October 2019. Badalona, Llagostera and L'Hospitalet received a bye. In this round, the Segunda División team Gimnàstic entered the competition.

Team 1	Score	Team 2
Prat	1–0	Gimnàstic

=== Semifinals ===
Games played on 27 November 2019.

Team 1	Score	Team 2
Llagostera	2–1	Prat
L'Hospitalet	2–2 (5–4 p)	Badalona

=== Final ===
Played on 9 October 2020 at Terrassa.

Team 1	Score	Team 2
Llagostera	0–0 (3–4 p)	L'Hospitalet

Llagostera:
1	(Spain) Marcos Pérez
2	(Spain) Aimar Moratalla	(yellow card) 76'
4	(Spain) Julen Monreal
6	(Spain) David García	(yellow card) 34'
7	(Spain) Sergio Cortés
9	(Spain) Sascha Andreu		(substituted off) 89'
10	(Spain) Gil Muntadas		(substituted off) 83'
12	(Spain) Genar Fornés		(substituted off) 80'
17	(Spain) Eric Jiménez		(substituted off) 53'
18	(Spain) Diego González
22	(Spain) Andreu Guiu		(substituted off) 67'
Substitutes:
13	(Spain) Albert Torra
5	(Argentina) Lucas Viale
8	(Spain) Pitu		(substituted on) 89'
11	(Spain) Cristian Dieste		(substituted on) 83'
15	(Spain) Aleix Roig		(substituted on) 67'
16	(Spain) Pau Salvans		(substituted on) 53'
20	(Spain) Pere Martínez
27	(Spain) Adrià García
29	(Spain) Jonathan Dubasin		(substituted on) 80'
Manager:
(Spain) Oriol Alsina

L'Hospitalet:
1	(Spain) Adrià Aliaga
2	(Spain) Daniel Reina
4	(Spain) Adrià Parera	(yellow card) 69'
5	(Spain) Cristian Gómez		(substituted off) 84'
6	(Spain) Martí Soler	(yellow card) 48'
8	(Spain) Canario	(yellow card) 20'
9	(Spain) Manuel Salinas		(substituted off) 76'
10	(Spain) Christian Alfonso		(substituted off) 54'
16	(Spain) Joel Jorquera
20	(Spain) Eudald Vergés		(substituted off) 63'
21	(Spain) Sergio Juste	(yellow card) 58'
Substitutes:
13	(Spain) Álex Ruiz
7	(Spain) Miquel Ripoll
11	(Spain) Marcos de la Espada		(substituted on) 76'
14	(Spain) Diego Martínez
15	(Cameroon) Aldo One
17	(Spain) Sehou Sarr		(substituted on) 63'
18	(Spain) Pablo Aguilera		(substituted on) 54'
19	(Spain) Joan Salvá
22	(Spain) Álex Felip		(substituted on) 84'
Manager:
(Spain) Jonathan Risueño
