= 2014–15 Copa Catalunya =

Catalonia Cup

Tournament details
- Country: Catalonia
- Teams: 30

The 2014–15 Copa Catalunya is the 26th staging of the Copa Catalunya. The competition began on 2 and 3 August 2014 and was played by teams in Segunda División, Segunda División B, Tercera División and the top teams of Primera Catalana. Teams of lower divisions played a new competition called Copa Catalunya Amateur. FC Barcelona and RCD Espanyol joined the competition with their reserve teams.

Girona, Sabadell and Barcelona B, who played in the 2013–14 Segunda División joined the competition in the fourth round.

== Tournament ==
=== First round ===
The first round was drawn on 4 July 2014.

- Bye: Llagostera

1 August 2014	Martinenc	2–0	Montañesa	Horta-Guinardó
	Velillas 49'; Juanlu 65'			Stadium: Mpal Guinardó; Referee: Rubén Mancera

2 August 2014	Rubí	1–1 (4–5 p)	Prat	Rubí
	Carlos Esteban 69'		Nacho 11'

2 August 2014	Cornellà	1–1 (2–3 p)	Cerdanyola del Vallès	Cornellà
	Joel Marin 86'		Dani Romero 28'

3 August 2014	Ascó	2–1	Lleida Esportiu	Ascó
	José Ramon 11'; Munta 57'		Rubén Arola 2'

3 August 2014	Vilafranca	0–0 (3–4 p)	Reus Deportiu	Vilafranca

3 August 2014	Castelldefels	0–0 (4–2 p)	Gimnàstic de Tarragona	Castelldefels

3 August 2014	Europa	1–0	Espanyol B	Barcelona
	Ignacio 61'			Stadium: Nou Sardenya

3 August 2014	Gavà	5–0	Terrassa	Gavà
	Xavi Civil 1', 28'; Adrià Grau 3'; Fran Orellana 19'; Vivó 41'

3 August 2014	Santfeliuenc	0–0 (2–4 p)	L'Hospitalet	Sant Feliu de Llobregat

3 August 2014	Masnou	3–3 (2–4 p)	Badalona	El Masnou

3 August 2014	Vilassar de Mar	1–1 (6–5 p)	Palamós	Vilassar de Mar

3 August 2014	Manlleu	2–3	Olot	Manlleu

3 August 2014	Peralada	0–2	Figueres	Peralada

4 August 2014	Santboià	2–1	Sant Andreu	Sant Boi de Llobregat

=== Second round ===
- Bye: Cerdanyola del Vallès

9 August 2014	Ascó	2–1	Reus Deportiu	Ascó
19:00				Stadium: Annex Municipal

10 August 2014	Santboià	0–0 (1–4 p)	Prat	Sant Boi de Llobregat
19:00				Stadium: Joan Baptista Milà

10 August 2014	Europa	2–2 (3–1 p)	Castelldefels	Santa Coloma de Gramenet
19:00				Stadium: Nou Municipal

10 August 2014	Vilassar de Mar	1–2	Olot	Vilassar de Mar
19:00				Stadium: Xevi Ramon

10 August 2014	Gavà	1–1 (3–1 p)	L'Hospitalet	Gavà
19:30				Stadium: La Bòbila

10 August 2014	Martinenc	1–1 (1–3 p)	Badalona	Horta-Guinardó
20:00				Stadium: Municipal Guinardó

10 August 2014	Figueres	1–1 (4–2 p)	Llagostera	Figueres
20:00				Stadium: Vilatenim

=== Third round ===
17 August 2014	Europa	1–1 (4–3 p)	Ascó	Santa Coloma de Gramenet
19:00				Stadium: Nou Municipal

17 August 2014	Gavà	2–0	Prat	Gavà
				Stadium: La Bòbila

17 August 2014	Badalona	0–0 (5–4 p)	Olot	Badalona
				Stadium: Pomar CD

17 August 2014	Figueres	0–0 (4–5 p)	Cerdanyola del Vallès	Figueres
				Stadium: Vilatenim

=== Quarterfinals ===
Bye: Gavà

12 November 2014	Europa	3–0	Barcelona B	Barcelona
	Javi Sánchez 4'; Alejandro Poves 61'; Ramón Rovira 92'			Stadium: Nou Sardenya; Attendance: 1,275; Referee: Albelda Bárcena

12 November 2014	Cerdanyola del Vallès	1–1 (3–4 p)	Sabadell	Cerdanyola del Vallès

12 November 2014	Badalona	1–1 (2–4 p)	Girona	Badalona
				Stadium: Pomar CD

=== Semifinals ===
The semifinals were drawn on 2 December 2014 and will be played on 4 February 2015.

4 February 2015	Europa	3–0	Sabadell	Barcelona
				Stadium: Nou Sardenya

4 February 2015	Gavà	0–1	Girona	Gavà
				Stadium: Estadi La Bòbila

=== Final ===
25 March 2015	Europa	2–1	Girona	Barcelona
		Report		Stadium: Nou Sardenya; Attendance: 3,140; Referee: Sánchez Aparicio
