= 2013–14 Copa Catalunya =

Catalonia Cup

Tournament details
- Country: Catalonia

The 2013–14 Copa Catalunya is the 25th staging of the Copa Catalunya. The competition began on 1 June 2013.

== Tournament ==
=== First phase ===
==== First round ====
1 June 2013	Bonavista	0 – 6	San Pedro San Pablo	Tarragona
15:00				Stadium: Municipal La Floresta

1 June 2013	Vallfogona Balaguer	5 – 1	Rosselló	Térmens
18:00				Stadium: Municipal

1 June 2013	Marina	1 – 1	Polinyà	Sant Quirze del Vallès
18:00				Stadium: Municipal

2 June 2013	Valldoreix	3 – 3	Tecnofútbol	Barcelona
12:00				Stadium: Municipal

2 June 2013	Trinidad	5 – 1	Singuerlin	Barcelona
12:00				Stadium: Municipal Trinitat Vella

2 June 2013	Carme	4 – 4	Balconada	Barcelona
12:00				Stadium: Municipal Carme

2 June 2013	La Llàntia	5 – 2	PB Sant Celoni	Mataró
12:00				Stadium: Municipal La Llàntia

2 June 2013	Pradenc	5 – 1	Sant Vicenç Torelló	Prats de Lluçanès
17:00				Stadium: Municipal

2 June 2013	Besòs Barón Viver	1 – 1	Racing Sarrià	Barcelona
18:00				Stadium: Municipal Trinitat Vella

2 June 2013	PB Sant Vicenç Horts	2 – 4	Pallejà	Sant Vicenç dels Horts
18:00				Stadium: La Guardia

==== Second round ====
8 June 2013	Viladamat	0 – 1	L'Escala	Viladamat
17:00				Stadium: Municipal

8 June 2013	Maià	2 – 3	Vilabertran	Maià de Montcal
17:00				Stadium: Municipal

8 June 2013	Vallfogona Balaguer	1 – 5	Alpicat	Vilanova de la Barca
18:00				Stadium: Municipal

8 June 2013	Palafolls	1 – 2	Sporting Vidrerenca	Palafolls
18:00				Stadium: Lluís Moner

8 June 2013	Marina	2 – 3	Pallejà	Sabadell
18:15				Stadium: Arrahona-Merinals

8 June 2013	Carme	0 – 4	San Mauro	Barcelona
18:30				Stadium: Carme

8 June 2013	Unió Girona	1 – 3	Banyoles	Fornells de la Selva
19:00				Stadium: Vedruna

8 June 2013	San Pedro San Pablo	1 – 2	Canonja	Tarragona
20:00				Stadium: Camp d'Esports

9 June 2013	Racing Sarrià	1 – 4	Badia Vallès	Barcelona
12:00				Stadium: UAB

9 June 2013	Valldoreix	2 – 3	Marianao Poblet	Barcelona
16:30				Stadium: Vallvidrera

9 June 2013	Corbera d'Ebre	1 – 7	Jesús i Maria	Corbera d'Ebre
17:00				Stadium: Municipal

9 June 2013	Pradenc	0 – 1	Sant Esteve Sesrovires	Prats de Lluçanès
18:00				Stadium: Municipal

9 June 2013	Trinidad	2 – 2	Espluguenc	Barcelona
18:00				Stadium: Trinitat Vella

9 June 2013	La Llàntia	4 – 1	Catalana	Mataró
19:00				Stadium: Municipal

9 June 2013	Solsona	2 – 1	Súria	Solsona
19:30				Stadium: Municipal

==== Third round ====
15 June 2013	Sant Esteve Sesrovires	3 – 1	San Mauro	Sant Esteve Sesrovires
18:00				Stadium: Municipal

16 June 2013	Canonja	1 – 2	Jesús i Maria	La Canonja
11:45				Stadium: Municipal

16 June 2013	Sporting Vidrerenca	1 – 1	Banyoles	Vidreres
17:00				Stadium: Municipal

16 June 2013	Vilabertran	1 – 6	L'Escala	Vilabertran
18:00				Stadium: Municipal

16 June 2013	La Llàntia	8 – 1	Badia Vallès	Mataró
18:00				Stadium: Municipal

16 June 2013	Solsona	1 – 1	Alpicat	Solsona
19:30				Stadium: Municipal

19 June 2013	Pallejà	2 – 3	Espluguenc	Pallejà
20:45				Stadium: Municipal

=== Second phase ===
==== First round ====
Bye: Prat

4 August 2013	La Llàntia	2 – 4	Vilassar	Mataró
19:30

8 August 2013	Banyoles	0 – 2	Olot	Banyoles
22:00		Report	20' Carlos; 88' Pagés	Stadium: Miquel Coromina; Attendance: 500; Referee: Ponsatí

9 August 2013	Jesús i Maria	1 – 4	Gimnàstic	Deltebre
20:30	Albert 60'	Report	25' Perera; 31' (pen.) Marcos; 49' David Sánchez; 80' Xavi Molina	Stadium: El Camp de l'Aube

10 August 2013	Espluguenc	2 – 4	Montañesa	Esplugues de Llobregat
19:00

10 August 2013	Rapitenca	1 – 1	Reus	Sant Carles de la Ràpita
19:00

10 August 2013	Alpicat	1 – 1	Balaguer	Alpicat
20:00

10 August 2013	Terrassa	0 – 0	Rubí	Terrassa
20:00

10 August 2013	L'Escala	0 – 2	Figueres	L'Escala
20:30

11 August 2013	Castelldefels	2 – 0	Europa	Castelldefels
19:00

11 August 2013	Manlleu	0 – 1	Vic	Manlleu
19:00

11 August 2013	Sant Esteve Sesrovires	2 – 7	Vilafranca	Sant Esteve Sesrovires
19:00

11 August 2013	Cerdanyola	2 – 2	Gramenet	Cerdanyola del Vallès
19:00

11 August 2013	Palamós	4 – 1	Llagostera	Palamós
19:00

11 August 2013	Marianao Poblet	1 – 1	Júpiter	Sant Boi de Llobregat
19:00

11 August 2013	Santboià	0 – 1	Sant Andreu	Sant Boi de Llobregat
19:00

11 August 2013	Ascó	1 – 0	Lleida Esportiu	Ascó
19:30

11 August 2013	Cornellà	0 – 0	L'Hospitalet	Cornellà de Llobregat
20:00

==== Second round ====
17 August 2013	Rapitenca	0 – 1	Gimnàstic	Sant Carles de la Ràpita
19:00

17 August 2013	Castelldefels	2 – 0	Sant Andreu	Castelldefels
19:30

17 August 2013	Ascó	5 – 1	Balaguer	Ascó
20:00

17 August 2013	Vilafranca	0 – 1	Rubí	Vilafranca del Penedès
20:00

17 August 2013	Cornellà	1 – 1	Prat	Cornellà de Llobregat
20:00

18 August 2013	Olot	0 – 0	Figueres	Olot
17:00

18 August 2013	Palamós	4 – 0	Vic	Palamós
19:00

18 August 2013	Cerdanyola	1 – 1	Vilassar	Cerdanyola del Vallès
19:00

18 August 2013	Júpiter	1 – 4	Montañesa	Barcelona
19:00

==== Third round ====
Bye: Castelldefels

9 October 2013	Ascó	0 – 0	Gimnàstic	Ascó
20:00

9 October 2013	Cerdanyola	2 – 0	Rubí	Cerdanyola del Vallès
20:30

9 October 2013	Montañesa	1 – 1	Prat	Barcelona
20:30

9 October 2013	Figueres	2 – 1	Palamós	Figueres
20:45

==== Fourth round ====
Bye: Figueres

13 November 2013	Ascó	1 – 0	Castelldefels	Ascó
19:30

13 November 2013	Cerdanyola	1 – 0	Prat	Cerdanyola del Vallès
20:00

==== Fifth round ====
Bye: Ascó

20 November 2013	Cerdanyola	2 – 2	Figueres	Cerdanyola del Vallès
20:00

==== Sixth round ====
4 March 2014	Figueres	0 – 0	Girona	Figueres
20:45

5 March 2014	Ascó	1 – 1	Sabadell	Ascó
20:00

=== Semifinals ===
13 May 2014	Espanyol	2 – 1	Sabadell	Girona
19:15	Córdoba 27'; Pizzi 30'		Clerc 49'	Stadium: Estadi Montilivi

13 May 2014	Barcelona	3 – 2	Girona	Girona
21:45	Babunski 18'; Cuenca 66' (pen.); Ilie 78'		Chando 35', 68'

=== Final ===
21 May 2014	Espanyol	0 – 0 (2 – 3 p)	Barcelona	Girona
				Stadium: Estadi Montilivi
	Penalties
	Héctor Rodríguez Ramos (penalty missed) Ferrán Monzó (penalty scored) Antonio Raíllo (penalty missed) Borja Martínez (penalty scored) Jairo Morillas (penalty missed)		Patric (penalty scored) Kaptoum (penalty scored) Denis Suárez (penalty missed) Grimaldo (penalty missed) Munir (penalty scored)
