= 2013–14 in Spanish football =

Football in Spain
- Season: 2013–14

Men's football
- La Liga: Atlético Madrid
- Copa del Rey: Real Madrid
- Supercopa de España: Barcelona

The 2013–14 season was the 110th season of competitive football in Spain. It started officially 1 July 2013 and ended 30 June 2014.

== Competitions dates ==
La Liga and Segunda División started 17 and 16 August respectively. All competitions stopped during the Christmas holidays between 23 December 2013 and 2 January 2014.

Competition	Starts	Ends	Notes
La Liga	17 August 2013	18 May 2014	All weekends except breaks: 8 September, 13 October, 17 November, 8 December and winter break. Matchdays at mid-week: 25 September, 30 October, 26 March. Teams qualified for 2013–14 Copa del Rey Final will play match corresponding of 34th matchday on 7 May 2014, or 1 May 2014 if any of finalists is qualified for UEFA competitions. Draw was released on 9 July 2013.
Segunda División	16 August 2013	22 June 2014	All weekends except winter break. Play-offs on 11, 15, 18 and 22 June 2013. Teams qualified for 2013–14 Copa del Rey Round of 32 will play match corresponding of 17th matchday in another date, at limit on 26 March 2014. Teams qualified for 2013–14 Copa del Rey Final will play match corresponding of 35th matchday on 7 May 2014, or 1 May 2014 if any of finalists is qualified for UEFA competitions. Draw was released on 9 July 2013.
Segunda División B	25 August 2013	22 June 2014	All weekends except winter break. All league matches (regular phase) must finish at maximum on 11 May 2013. Play-offs in weekends from 18 May to 22 June 2013. Draw was released on 7 August 2013.
Tercera División			
Copa del Rey	4 September 2013	19 April 2014	Draws and calendar
Supercopa de España	21 August 2013	28 August 2013	
Copa Federación			
Primera División (women)	8 September 2013	4 May 2013	
Segunda División (women)	15 September 2013	4 May 2013	
Copa de la Reina			

== Transfer windows ==
=== Retirements ===
The following players retired from association football at the end of 2012–13 season or during this season, being the last club a member of 2013–14 La Liga or 2013–14 Segunda División:

Name	Club of retirement	Date
David Albelda	Valencia	10 June 2013
Mikel Labaka	Real Sociedad	24 June 2013

== Promotion and relegation (pre-season) ==
Teams promoted to 2013–14 La Liga

- Elche CF
- Villarreal CF
- UD Almería

Teams relegated from 2012–13 La Liga

- RCD Mallorca
- Deportivo de La Coruña
- Real Zaragoza

Teams promoted to 2013–14 Segunda División

- Deportivo Alavés
- CD Tenerife
- Real Jaén
- SD Eibar

Teams relegated from 2012–13 Segunda División

- CD Guadalajara
- Racing de Santander
- SD Huesca
- Xerez CD

Teams promoted to 2013–14 Segunda División B

- Racing de Ferrol
- Elche CF Ilicitano
- CD Puerta Bonita
- Burgos CF
- Algeciras CF
- UD Las Palmas Atlético
- La Hoya Lorca CF
- CD Sariñena
- CD Toledo
- Celta de Vigo B
- SD Compostela
- CD Tropezón
- CD Laudio
- UE Olot
- Cultural y Deportiva Leonesa
- CD El Palo
- Granada CF B
- UB Conquense

Teams relegated from 2012–13 Segunda División B

- UD San Sebastián de los Reyes
- RSD Alcalá
- Rayo Vallecano B
- CD Marino
- Gimnástica de Torrelavega (administrative)
- Real Zaragoza B
- Racing de Santander B
- CD Teruel
- CA Osasuna B
- CD Izarra
- CE Constància (relegation revoked)
- RCD Mallorca B
- Orihuela CF
- Yeclano Deportivo
- CD Binissalem
- CF Villanovense
- UCAM Murcia CF
- Loja CD
- CD San Roque de Lepe
- Real Betis B

Teams dissolved

- UD Salamanca

== National team ==
The home team is on the left column; the away team is on the right column.

=== FIFA World Cup qualifiers ===
Spain is in Group I of the 2014 World Cup qualification process.

6 September 2013	Finland	0–2	Spain	Olympiastadion, Helsinki
21:30 UTC+3		Report	Alba 19'; Negredo 86'	Attendance: 37,492; Referee: Ivan Bebek (Croatia)

11 October 2013	Spain	2–1	Belarus	Iberostar, Palma
22:00 UTC+2	Xavi 61'; Negredo 78'	Report	Kornilenko 89'	Attendance: 22,900; Referee: Bas Nijhuis (Netherlands)

15 October 2013	Spain	2–0	Georgia	Carlos Belmonte, Albacete
21:00 UTC+2	Negredo 26'; Mata 61'	Report		Attendance: 16,133; Referee: Florian Meyer (Germany)

=== FIFA World Cup ===
13 June 2014	Spain	1–5	Netherlands	Arena Fonte Nova, Salvador
16:00 UTC−3	Alonso 27' (pen.)		Van Persie 44', 72'; Robben 53', 80'; De Vrij 65'	Attendance: 48,173; Referee: Nicola Rizzoli (Italy)

18 June 2014	Spain	0–2	Chile	Estádio do Maracanã, Rio de Janeiro
16:00 UTC−3			Vargas 20'; Aránguiz 43'	Attendance: 74,101; Referee: Mark Geiger (United States)

23 June 2014	Australia	0–3	Spain	Arena da Baixada, Curitiba
13:00 UTC−3			Villa 36'; Torres 69'; Mata 82'	Attendance: 39,375; Referee: Nawaf Shukralla (Bahrain

=== Friendlies ===
14 August 2013	Ecuador	0–2	Spain	Estadio Monumental, Guayaquil
15.00		Report	Negredo 25'; Cazorla 63'	Attendance: 45,000; Referee: Wilmar Roldán (Colombia)

10 September 2013	Spain	2–2	Chile	Stade de Genève, Geneva
20:00 UTC+2	Soldado 37'; Navas 90'	Report	Vargas 5', 44'	Attendance: 15,635; Referee: Adrien Jaccottet (Switzerland)

16 November 2013	Equatorial Guinea	1–2	Spain	Estadio de Malabo, Malabo
22.00	Bermúdez 36'	Report	Cazorla 13'; Juanfran 42'	Attendance: 13,500; Referee: Joaquín Ela Esono (Equatorial Guinea)

19 November 2013	South Africa	1–0	Spain	Soccer City, Johannesburg
20.00	Parker 56'	Report		Attendance: 36,000; Referee: Osiase Koto (Lesotho)

5 March 2014	Spain	1–0	Italy	Vicente Calderón Stadium, Madrid
20.00	Pedro 63'	Report		Attendance: 36,000; Referee: E. Aranovskiy

30 May 2014	Spain	2–0	Bolivia	Ramón Sánchez Pizjuán Stadium, Seville
TBD	Torres 50' inesta 60'

7 June 2014	El Salvador	0–2	Spain	Washington, D.C.
TBD	Viia 60', 87'

== Spanish friendly tournaments ==
List of some friendly matches or short tournaments which are celebrating in Spain, mainly at summer as part of pre-season, which participate La Liga and Segunda División teams. Other historical tournaments are also included.

12 July 2013 Trofeo Alcalde Villa de Los Barrios	Los Barrios	0–7	Real Betis	San Rafael, Los Barrios
21:00 CEST		Report	Molina 10'; Caro 27'; Cedrick 33'; Castro 49', 90'; Á. Martínez 72'; Sevilla 88'	Attendance: 2,700; Referee: José Antonio Delgado García

19 July 2013 Trofeo Huerta de Europa	La Hoya Lorca	0–2	Granada	Francisco Artés Carrasco, Lorca
20:00 CEST		Report	El-Arabi 11' (pen.); Riki 86'

27 July 2013 Emma Cuervo	Lugo	2–1	Sporting Gijón	Estadio Pepe Barrera, Ribadeo
	Bernardo 34' (o.g.); Sandaza 57'	Report	Barrera 42'	Attendance: 1,500; Referee: Rubén Eiriz Mata

2 August 2013 Joan Gamper	Barcelona	8–0	(Brazil) Santos	Camp Nou, Barcelona
21:30 CEST	Messi 8'; Léo 12' (o.g.); Sánchez 22'; Pedro 29'; Fàbregas 53', 68'; Adriano 75'; Dongou 83'	Report		Attendance: 81,251; Referee: Estrada Fernández

3 August 2013 Memorial Quinocho	Celta Vigo	0–0	(England) Southampton	Balaídos, Vigo
		Report		Attendance: 10,000; Referee: Iglesias Villanueva

3 August 2013 Ciudad de Alicante	Hércules	1–1 (1–4 p)	Elche	José Rico Pérez, Alicante
21:00 CEST	Assulin 67'	Report	Coro 72'	Attendance: 4,000; Referee: Salazar López de la Oliva
	Penalties
	Assulin (penalty scored); Héctor Yuste (penalty missed); Ortiz (penalty missed)		Mantecón (penalty scored); Albácar (penalty scored); Lombán (penalty scored); Coro (penalty scored)

3 August 2013 Trofeo Carranza	Cádiz	1–1 (2–4 p)	Sevilla	Ramón de Carranza, Cádiz
	Villar 33'	Report	Perotti

7 August 2013 Memorial Ramón Losada	Sporting Gijón	1–1 (1–2 p)	Real Valladolid	La Veigona, Luarca
19:00 CEST	Bernardo 69'	Report	Guerra 41'	Attendance: 1,200; Referee: Alejandro Granda Barros

7 August 2013 Trofeo Vallecas	Rayo Vallecano	1–1 (4–2 p)	Getafe	Campo de Vallecas, Madrid
20:30 CEST	Larrivey 38'	Report	Miku 80'	Attendance: 5,000; Referee: Del Cerro Grande

10 August 2013 Trofeo Teide	Tenerife	v	Celta Vigo	La Orotava
--:-- CEST				Stadium: Los Cuartos

10 August 2013 Ciudad de Zaragoza - Memorial Carlos Lapetra	Zaragoza	v	Getafe	Zaragoza
21:00 CEST				Stadium: La Romareda

11 August 2013 Villa de Gijón	Sporting Gijón	1 – 4	Villarreal	Gijón
20:00 CEST	Carlos Carmona 78'	Report	Aquino 6'; Cani 22'; Perbet 58', 68'	Stadium: El Molinón; Attendance: 10,000; Referee: González Fuerte

10 August 2013 Trofeo Naranja	Valencia	2 – 1	(Greece) Olympiacos	Valencia
21:30 CEST	Banega 4'; Postiga 40'	Report	Fejsa (yellow card) 31'; Fuster 84'	Stadium: Mestalla; Attendance: 35,000; Referee: Mateu Lahoz

22 August 2013 Trofeo Bernabéu	Real Madrid	v	(Qatar) Al Sadd	Madrid
22:30 CEST				Stadium: Santiago Bernabéu

6 September 2013 Ciudad de Valladolid	Valladolid	v	Valencia	Valladolid, Spain
20:00 CEST				Stadium: José Zorrilla

=== Other unofficial/friendly tournaments ===
Other unofficial major tournaments or friendly matches celebrated in Spain are:

- 2013–14 Copa Catalunya

== Competitions ==
=== Trophy and league champions ===
Competition	Winner	Details	At
La Liga	Atlético Madrid	2013–14 La Liga	Camp Nou
Segunda División	Eibar	2013–14 Segunda División (Play-Off 2ª)	
Segunda División B	Overall Champions: Albacete; Overall Runners-up: Racing de Santander; Group 1: Racing de Santander; Group 2: Sestao; Group 3: Llagostera; Group 4: Albacete	2013–14 Segunda División B (Play-Off 2ªB)	
Tercera División	Group 1: Somozas; Group 2: Lealtad; Group 3: Gimnástica; Group 4: Leioa; Group 5: Cornellà; Group 6: Eldense; Group 7: Trival Valderas; Group 8: Valladolid B Group 9: Marbella; Group 10: Betis B Group 11: Mallorca B Group 12: Atlético Granadilla; Group 13: UCAM Murcia; Group 14: Villanovense; Group 15: Izarra; Group 16: Varea; Group 17: Zaragoza B Group 18: Puertollano	2013–14 Tercera División (Play-Off 3ª)	—
Copa del Rey	Real Madrid	2013–14 Copa del Rey	Mestalla
Supercopa de España	Barcelona	2013 Supercopa de España; Beat Atlético Madrid 1–1 on agg. away goals (1–1 away and 0–0 home)	Camp Nou
Copa Federación de España	CD Ourense	2013–14 Copa Federación de España	O Couto
Primera División (women)	Barcelona	2013–14 Primera División (women)	
Segunda División (women)	Group 1: FVPR El Olivo; Group 2: Athletic B Group 3: Espanyol B Group 4: Santa Teresa; Group 5: Rayo B Group 6: Group 7: Granadilla; Group 8: Fundación Albacete	2013–14 Segunda División (women)	—
Copa de la Reina	To be determined	2014 Copa de la Reina	

== League tables ==
=== La Liga ===
Pos	Team	Pld	W	D	L	GF	GA	GD	Pts	Qualification or relegation
1	Atlético Madrid (C)	38	28	6	4	77	26	+51	90	Qualification for the Champions League group stage
2	Barcelona	38	27	6	5	100	33	+67	87 (Note: Barcelona finished ahead of Real Madrid on head-to-head points: Barcelona 2–1 Real Madrid, Real Madrid 3–4 Barcelona.)	Qualification for the Champions League group stage
3	Real Madrid	38	27	6	5	104	38	+66	87	Qualification for the Champions League group stage
4	Athletic Bilbao	38	20	10	8	66	39	+27	70	Qualification for the Champions League play-off round
5	Sevilla	38	18	9	11	69	52	+17	63	Qualification for the Europa League group stage (Note: Sevilla automatically qualified for the 2014–15 UEFA Europa League group stage as the defending champions; the berth through their league position was vacated.)
6	Villarreal	38	17	8	13	60	44	+16	59 (Note: Villarreal finished ahead of Real Sociedad on head-to-head points: Villarreal 5–1 Real Sociedad, Real Sociedad 1–2 Villarreal.)	Qualification for the Europa League play-off round (Note: Since both the 2013–14 Copa del Rey champions (Real Madrid) and runners-up (Barcelona) qualified for the 2014–15 UEFA Champions League, the 5th, 6th and 7th placed teams qualified for the group stage, play-off round and third qualifying round of the 2014–15 UEFA Europa League respectively.)
7	Real Sociedad	38	16	11	11	62	55	+7	59	Qualification for the Europa League third qualifying round
8	Valencia	38	13	10	15	51	53	−2	49	
9	Celta Vigo	38	14	7	17	49	54	−5	49	
10	Levante	38	12	12	14	35	43	−8	48	
11	Málaga	38	12	9	17	39	46	−7	45	
12	Rayo Vallecano	38	13	4	21	46	80	−34	43	
13	Getafe	38	11	9	18	35	54	−19	42	
14	Espanyol	38	11	9	18	41	51	−10	42	
15	Granada	38	12	5	21	32	56	−24	41	
16	Elche	38	9	13	16	30	50	−20	40 (Note: Elche finished ahead of Almería on head-to-head points: Elche 1–0 Almería, Almería 2–2 Elche.)	
17	Almería	38	11	7	20	43	71	−28	40	
18	Osasuna (R)	38	10	9	19	32	62	−30	39	Relegation to Segunda División
19	Valladolid (R)	38	7	15	16	38	60	−22	36	Relegation to Segunda División
20	Real Betis (R)	38	6	7	25	36	78	−42	25	Relegation to Segunda División

Source: La Liga, ESPN
Rules for classification: 1st points; 2nd head-to-head points;
(C) Champions; (R) Relegated

=== Segunda División ===
Pos	Team	Pld	W	D	L	GF	GA	GD	Pts	Promotion, qualification or relegation
1	Eibar (C, P)	42	19	14	9	49	28	+21	71	Promotion to La Liga
2	Deportivo La Coruña (P)	42	19	12	11	48	36	+12	69	Promotion to La Liga
3	Barcelona B (Note: Barcelona B could not participate in the play-offs as they are Barcelona's reserve team, so the seventh positioned team qualified for the play-offs.)	42	20	6	16	60	46	+14	66	
4	Murcia (R)	42	16	17	9	55	44	+11	65	Qualification to the promotion play offs and relegation to Segunda División B (Note: Murcia failed to obtain a professional license and were relegated to the Segunda División B by the LFP while Mirandés was re-instated.)
5	Sporting Gijón	42	16	16	10	63	51	+12	64	Qualification to promotion play-offs
6	Las Palmas	42	18	9	15	51	50	+1	63	Qualification to promotion play-offs
7	Córdoba (O, P)	42	16	13	13	47	43	+4	61 (Note: COR 2–0 REC; REC 1–1 COR)	Qualification to promotion play-offs
8	Recreativo	42	16	13	13	53	53	0	61	
9	Alcorcón	42	16	11	15	46	40	+6	59 (Note: SAB 1–2 ALC; ALC 3–1 SAB)	
10	Sabadell	42	17	8	17	52	58	−6	59	
11	Tenerife	42	15	9	18	46	49	−3	54 (Note: TEN: 7 pts → TEN 0–1 LUGO; LUGO: 7 pts → LUGO 1–3 TEN; NUM: 2 pts)	
12	Lugo	42	14	12	16	41	48	−7	54	
13	Numancia	42	11	21	10	42	41	+1	54	
14	Zaragoza	42	13	14	15	49	53	−4	53	
15	Girona	42	12	15	15	52	50	+2	51 (Note: GIR: 9 pts → GIR 1–1 PON; PON: 9 pts → PON 1–2 GIR; MAL: 8 pts; ALA: 5 pts)	
16	Ponferradina	42	13	12	17	46	49	−3	51	
17	Mallorca	42	12	15	15	46	57	−11	51	
18	Alavés	42	13	12	17	57	57	0	51	
19	Mirandés	42	13	11	18	38	56	−18	50	Spared from relegation
20	Real Madrid Castilla (R)	42	13	10	19	49	56	−7	49	Relegation to Segunda División B
21	Jaén (R)	42	12	12	18	43	49	−6	48	Relegation to Segunda División B
22	Hércules (R)	42	11	12	19	45	62	−17	45	Relegation to Segunda División B

Source: LFP - Liga Adelante
Rules for classification: 1st points; 2nd head-to-head points; 3rd head-to-head goal difference; 4th goal difference; 5th number of goals scored.
(C) Champions; (O) Play-off winners; (P) Promoted; (R) Relegated

== Cup results ==
Final bracket

Round of 32; 6/7/8 December 2013; 17/18/19 December 2013
Real Valladolid	0	1	1
Rayo Vallecano	0	3	3
Recreativo	1	0	1
Levante	0	4	4
Cartagena	1	0	1
Barcelona	4	3	7
Girona	1	1	2
Getafe	1	4	5
Algeciras	1	0	1
Real Sociedad	1	4	5
Villarreal	2	1	3
Elche	2	0	2
Racing Santander	0	2	2
Sevilla	1	0	1
Las Palmas	1	0	1
Almería	3	0	3
Alcorcón (5-4, pso)	0	2	2
Granada	2	0	2
Real Jaén	2	0	2
Espanyol	2	2	4
Olímpic	0	0	0
Real Madrid	0	2	2
Málaga	3	1	4
Osasuna (a)	3	1	4
Gimnàstic	0	0	0
Valencia	0	1	1
Sant Andreu	0	1	1
Atlético Madrid	4	2	6
Lleida Esportiu	1	2	3
Betis	2	2	4
Celta de Vigo	1	0	1
Athletic Bilbao	0	4	4

Round of 16; 7/8/9 January 2014; 14/15/16 January 2014
Rayo Vallecano	0	0	0
Levante	0	1	1
Barcelona	4	2	6
Getafe	0	0	0
Real Sociedad	0	1	1
Villarreal	0	0	0
Racing Santander	1	2	3
Almería	1	0	1
Alcorcón	1	2	3
Espanyol	0	4	4
Real Madrid	2	2	4
Osasuna	0	0	0
Valencia	1	0	1
Atlético Madrid	1	2	3
Betis	1	0	1
Athletic Bilbao	0	2	2

Quarter-finals; 21/22/23 January 2014; 28/29/30 January 2014
Levante	1	1	2
Barcelona	4	5	9
Real Sociedad	3	0†	3
Racing Santander	1	0	1
Espanyol	0	0	0
Real Madrid	1	1	2
Atlético Madrid	1	2	3
Athletic Bilbao	0	1	1

Semi-finals; 5 February 2014; 11/12 February 2014
Barcelona	2	1	3
Real Sociedad	0	1	1
Real Madrid	3	2	5
Atlético Madrid	0	0	0

Final; 16 April 2014
Barcelona	1
Real Madrid	2
