= Ratto =

Ratto is an Italian surname. Notable people with the surname include:

- Cora Ratto (1912–1981), Argentine mathematician and educator
- Daniele Ratto (born 1989), Italian cyclist
- Guido Ratto (born 1999), Argentine footballer
- Patricia Ratto (born 1962), Argentine writer
- Ray Ratto, American sportswriter
- Rossella Ratto (born 1993), Italian cyclist
- Teresa Ratto (1877-1906), Argentine physician

== See also ==
- Vilho Rättö (1913 - 2002), Finnish Knight of the Mannerheim Cross, driver and industrial worker
