= Copa Catalunya =

Copa de Catalunya
- Organiser(s): Catalan Football Federation
- Founded: 1989
- Region: Catalonia and Andorra
- Teams: 100-150
- Current champions: Sabadell (2nd title)
- Most championships: Barcelona (8 titles)
- Website: www.fcf.cat
- 2026–27 Copa Catalunya

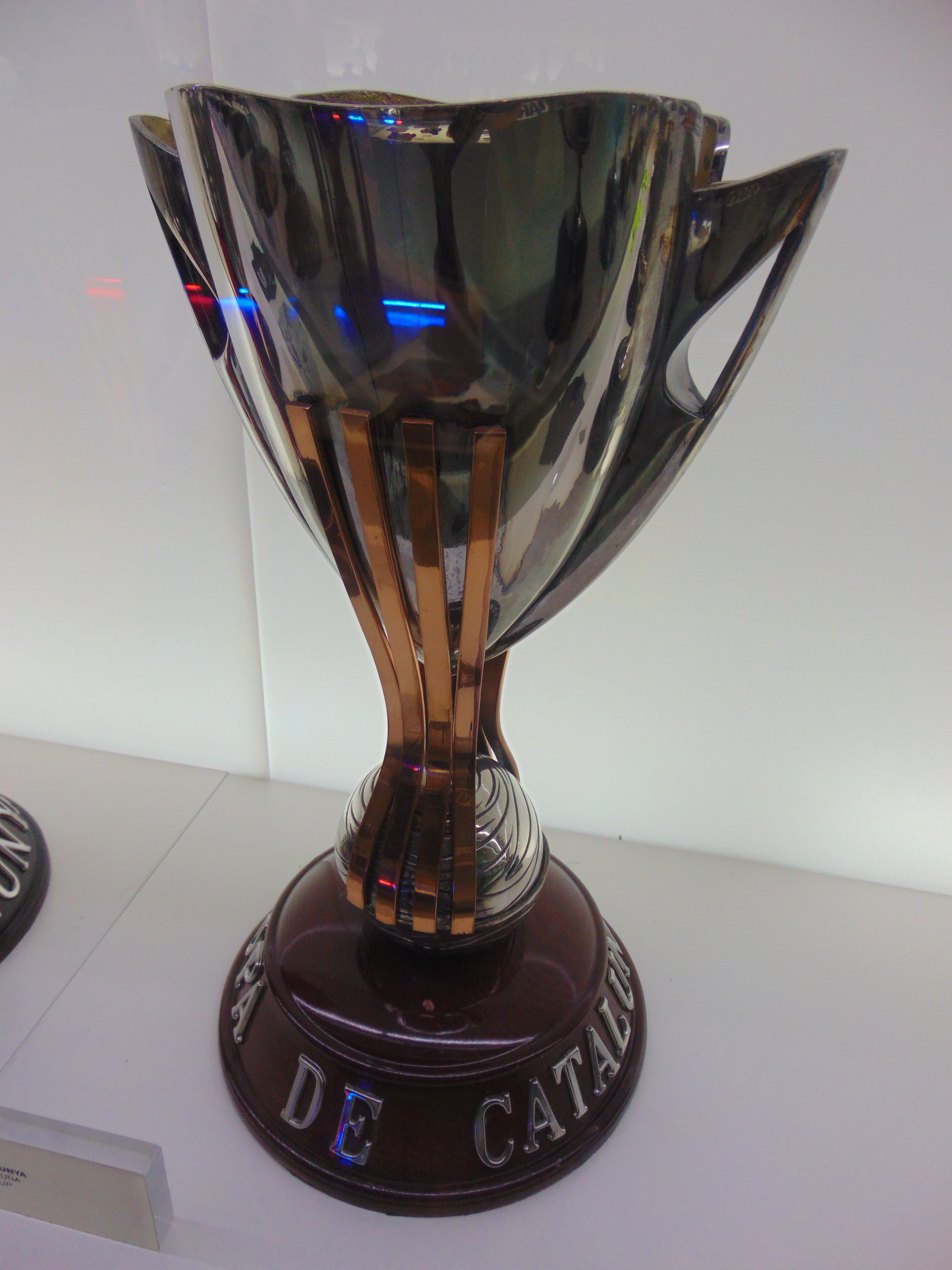
Catalonia Cup from the Collections of the FC Barcelona Museum.

The Copa Catalunya (transl. Catalonia Cup) is a knockout competition organised by the Catalan Football Federation for football clubs in the Catalonia autonomous community of Spain.

== History ==
Between 1903 and 1940, it was known as the Championship of Catalonia, and enjoyed great prestige and interest at a time where La Liga did not exist. The club that won the title participated with other regional champions in the Spanish Cup, which until the beginning of La Liga in 1929 was the most important tournament in Spanish football.

The Championship of Catalonia football was prohibited from taking place after 1940 by Francoist Spain. Catalan clubs were forced to compete only in competitions organised by the Spanish Football Federation, which included La Liga and the Copa del Generalísimo.

Once democracy was restored in Spain, it was again held in 1984 under the name Copa Generalitat, although during the first five editions, it had no recognition from the Spanish Football Federation. It was held in the pre-season of August, and only non-professional third-division teams were allowed to participate.

The 1989–90 season was recognized as an official competition by the Catalan Football Federation. In 1991, First and Second Division teams such as FC Barcelona and RCD Espanyol were allowed to join the competition; since then, these teams have been able to win most of the tournaments. In 1993, the competition was renamed to Copa Catalunya.

In recent years, the competition has acquired a certain prestige thanks to the Catalan media because of the involvement of the big clubs like Barcelona and Espanyol and the fielding of their biggest stars to compete. However, the prestige of the cup is still far from the splendor it enjoyed before the 1940s.

In 2012 the format of the Copa Catalunya was changed. Henceforth, there will be two competitions, one for the Copa Catalunya and one for the Supercopa de Catalunya. The latter will be held between the two biggest teams of the region.

On 31 July 2012, Catalan Football Federation announced the permanent suspension of the Supercopa competition due to previous disagreements between Catalonia's top football clubs FC Barcelona and RCD Espanyol.

For the 2014–15 edition, both teams agreed to play the Supercopa on 29 October at Estadi Montilivi, Girona, while the reserve teams of both clubs joined the 2014–15 Copa Catalunya.

In July 2016, the Catalan Football Federation, Barcelona and Espanyol agreed to play again the Supercopa de Catalunya, two years after its first edition.

== Copa Generalitat (unofficial) ==
Season	Winner	Runner up	Result
1984–85	FC Barcelona C	CE Manresa	3–3 p.
1985–86	CE Manresa	Terrassa FC	0–0 p.
1986–87	CE Manresa	Terrassa FC	5–2
1987–88	CF Lloret	CP San Cristóbal	3–0
1988–89	CF Lloret	UE Sant Andreu	1–1 p.

== Copa Generalitat (official) ==
Season	Date	Sede	Winner	Runner up	Result
1989–90	2 June 1990	Municipal, Palamós	CD Blanes	UDA Gramenet	2–0
1990–91	4 June 1991	Camp d'Esports, Lleida	FC Barcelona	CE Sabadell FC	6–3
1991–92	9 June 1992	Camp d'Esports, Lleida	Palamós CF	UE Lleida	3–1
1992–93	20 May 1993	Nou Estadi, Tarragona	FC Barcelona	RCD Espanyol	4–3

== Copa Catalunya ==
Season	Date of the final	Venue	Winner	Runner up	Result
1993–94	7 June 1994	Municipal, Vilassar de Mar	FC Andorra	RCD Espanyol	0–0 (4–2 p.)
1994–95	20 June 1995	Estadi Olímpic, Terrassa	RCD Espanyol	Palamós CF	3–1
1995–96	13 March 1996	Olímpic Lluís Companys, Barcelona	RCD Espanyol	FC Barcelona	5–1
1996–97	10 June 1997	Municipal, L'Hospitalet de Llobregat	CE Europa	FC Barcelona	3–1
1997–98	5 May 1998	Mini Estadi, Barcelona	CE Europa	FC Barcelona	1–1 (4–3 p.)
1998–99	11 May 1999	Camp d'Esports, Lleida	RCD Espanyol	UE Lleida	2–1
1999–00	16 May 2000	Estadi Olímpic, Terrassa	FC Barcelona	CE Mataró	3–0
2000–01	13 June 2001	Camp d'Esports, Lleida	CF Balaguer	FC Barcelona	2–2 (4–3 p.)
2001–02	7 May 2002	Estadi Olímpic, Terrassa	Terrassa FC	FC Barcelona	1–1 (4–1 p.)
2002–03	18 June 2003	Nova Creu Alta, Sabadell	Terrassa FC	CF Gavà	3–0
2003–04	26 August 2003	Montilivi, Girona	FC Barcelona	RCD Espanyol	1–0
2004–05	22 August 2004	Nou Estadi, Tarragona	FC Barcelona	RCD Espanyol	2–0
2005–06	5 September 2006	Montilivi, Girona	RCD Espanyol	FC Barcelona	1–0
2006–07	5 June 2007	Nova Creu Alta, Sabadell	FC Barcelona	RCD Espanyol	1–1 (5–4 p.)
2007–08	11 September 2007	Nou Municipal, Palamós	Gimnàstic de Tarragona	FC Barcelona	2–1
2008–09	8 October 2008	La Devesa, Sant Carles de la Ràpita	UE Sant Andreu	RCD Espanyol	2–1
2009–10	1 December 2010	Nova Creu Alta, Sabadell	RCD Espanyol (6 points)	FC Barcelona (3 points)	ESP 1–0 L'H; FCB 1–2 ESP; L'H 0–2 FCB
2010–11	8/9 August 2011	Nou Estadi, Tarragona	RCD Espanyol	FC Barcelona	3–0
2011–12	12 September 2012	Camp Municipal, Manlleu	Gimnàstic de Tarragona	AEC Manlleu	1–0
2012–13	29 May 2013	Camp d'Esports, Lleida	FC Barcelona	RCD Espanyol	1–1 (4–2 p.)
2013–14	21 May 2014	Estadi Montilivi, Girona	FC Barcelona	RCD Espanyol	0–0 (3–2 p.)
2014–15	25 March 2015	Nou Sardenya, Barcelona	CE Europa	Girona FC	2–1
2015–16	30 March 2016	Nova Creu Alta, Sabadell	CE Sabadell FC	Barcelona Atlètic	2–0
2016–17	28 March 2017	Estadi Municipal, Olot	Gimnàstic de Tarragona	Girona FC	0–0 (4–3 p.)
2017–18	2 June 2018	Estadi Municipal La Bòbila, Gavà	UE Cornellà	UA Horta	3–2
2018–19	1 May 2019	Estadi la Feixa Llarga, L'Hospitalet de Llobregat	UE Sant Andreu	FC Vilafranca	2–0
2019–20	9 October 2020	Olímpic, Terrassa	CE L'Hospitalet	UE Llagostera	0–0 (4–3 p.)
2020–2022	Not disputed due to the COVID-19 pandemic				
2022–23	15 February 2023	Estadi Municipal, Badalona	FC Andorra	CF Badalona Futur	1–0
2023–24	20 March 2024	Estadi Municipal, Olot	FC Andorra	UE Olot	1–1 (4–2 p.)
2024–25	23 July 2025	Nova Creu Alta, Sabadell	Girona FC	RCD Espanyol	0–0 (5–4 p.)
2025–26	2 September 2026	Nova Creu Alta, Sabadell	CE Sabadell FC	Barcelona Atlètic	2–1

== Performance by club ==
Club	Winners	Runners-up	Winning years	Runner-up years
FC Barcelona	8	9	1990–91, 1992–93, 1999–00, 2003–04, 2004–05, 2006–07, 2012–13, 2013–14	1995–96, 1996–97, 1997–98, 2000–01, 2001–02, 2005–06, 2007–08, 2009–10, 2010–11
RCD Espanyol	6	9	1994–95, 1995–96, 1998–99, 2005–06, 2009–10, 2010–11	1992–93, 1993–94, 2003–04, 2004–05, 2006–07, 2008–09, 2012–13, 2013–14, 2024–25
FC Andorra	3	0	1993–94, 2022–23, 2023–24	-
CE Europa	3	0	1996–97, 1997–98, 2014–15	-
Gimnàstic de Tarragona	3	0	2007–08, 2011–12, 2016–17	-
Terrassa FC	2	2	2001–02, 2002–03	1985–86, 1986–87
CE Manresa	2	1	1985–86, 1986–87	1984–85
UE Sant Andreu	2	1	2008–09, 2018–19	1988–89
CE Sabadell FC	2	1	2015–16, 2025–26	1990–91
CF Lloret	2	0	1987–88, 1988–89	-
Girona FC	1	2	2024–25	2014–15, 2016–17
Palamós CF	1	1	1991–92	1994–95
FC Barcelona C	1	0	1984–85	
CD Blanes	1	0	1989–90	-
CF Balaguer	1	0	2000–01	-
UE Cornellà	1	0	2017–18	-
CE L'Hospitalet	1	0	2019–20	-
UE Lleida	0	2	-	1991–92, 1998–99
FC Barcelona B	0	2	-	2015–16, 2025–26
CP San Cristóbal	0	1	-	1987–88
UDA Gramenet	0	1	-	1989–90
CE Mataró	0	1	-	1999–00
CF Gavà	0	1	-	2002–03
AEC Manlleu	0	1	-	2011–12
UA Horta	0	1	-	2017–18
FC Vilafranca	0	1	-	2018–19
UE Llagostera	0	1	-	2019–20
CF Badalona Futur	0	1	-	2022–23
UE Olot	0	1	-	2023–24

== Supercopa de Catalunya ==
Year	Venue	Winner	Runner-up	Score
2014	Estadi Montilivi, Girona	FC Barcelona	RCD Espanyol	1–1 (4–2 p)
2016	Nou Estadi, Tarragona	RCD Espanyol	FC Barcelona	1–0
2018	Camp d'Esports, Lleida	FC Barcelona	RCD Espanyol	0–0 (4–2 p)
2019	Nova Creu Alta, Sabadell	Girona	FC Barcelona	1–0

== See also ==
- Copa Catalunya (women's football), female counterpart.
