= Emili Vicente =

Spanish footballer

Personal information
- Full name: Emili Vicente Vives
- Date of birth: 2 January 1965
- Place of birth: La Seu d'Urgell, Spain
- Date of death: 25 May 2017 (aged 52)
- Place of death: Canòlic, Andorra
- Position: Midfielder

Senior career*
Years	Team	Apps	(Gls)
1986–1989	Lleida	35	(0)
1989–1994	Balaguer	176	(24)
1994–1997	Tàrrega	108	(23)
1997–1998	Gavà	7	(0)
1998–1999	Tàrrega	36	(14)
1999–2003	Balaguer		
Total		382	(64)

Managerial career
- 2003–2008: Balaguer
- 2008–2011: Lleida
- 2011–2012: Lleida Esportiu
- 2013–2014: Reus
- 2016–2017: FC Andorra
- * Club domestic league appearances and goals

Emili Vicente Vives (2 January 1965 – 25 May 2017) was a Spanish footballer who played as a midfielder.

As a player, Vicente represented UE Lleida in Segunda División, Balaguer and Tàrrega. He managed Segunda División B club Lleida Esportiu since July 2011 until June 2012.

Vicente died in a bicycle accident in Andorra in May 2017.

== Managerial statistics ==
As of 20 May 2017

Managerial record by team and tenure
Team	Nat	From	To	Record								Ref
Team	Nat	From	To	G	W	D	L	GF	GA	GD	Win %	Ref
Balaguer	(Spain)	1 July 2003	22 May 2008	190	73	58	59	254	235	+19	38.42	
Lleida	(Spain)	22 May 2008	16 May 2011	114	43	36	35	136	112	+24	37.72	
Lleida Esportiu	(Spain)	19 July 2011	15 June 2012	39	16	11	12	51	43	+8	41.03	
Reus	(Spain)	20 June 2013	1 June 2014	38	14	9	15	38	49	−11	36.84	
FC Andorra	(Andorra)	1 July 2016	25 May 2017	33	18	7	8	42	31	+11	54.55	
Total				414	164	121	129	521	470	+51	39.61	—
