= Diego Gómez (footballer, born 1999) =

Spanish footballer (born 1999)

Personal information
- Full name: Diego Gómez Martín
- Date of birth: 13 June 1999 (age 27)
- Place of birth: Trescasas, Spain
- Height: 1.87 m (6 ft 2 in)
- Position: Forward

Team information
- Current team: Gimnàstic

Youth career
- Gimnástica Segoviana

Senior career*
Years	Team	Apps	(Gls)
2016–2023	Gimnástica Segoviana	124	(30)
2023–2024	Fuenlabrada	20	(1)
2024–2025	Gimnástica Segoviana	33	(2)
2025–2026	Cacereño	38	(6)
2026–	Gimnàstic	0	(0)
- * Club domestic league appearances and goals as of 9 June 2026

Diego Gómez Martín (born 13 June 1999) is a Spanish professional footballer who plays as a forward for Gimnàstic de Tarragona.

== Career ==
Born in Trescasas, Segovia, Castile and León, Gómez represented local side Gimnástica Segoviana CF as a youth, before making his senior debut on 7 May 2016, in a 3–1 Tercera División away win over CD Mirandés B. He scored his first goal on 17 December of the following year, but in a 2–1 Segunda División B home loss to AD Unión Adarve.

After suffering relegation from the third tier in 2018, Gómez started to feature more regularly until suffering an anterior cruciate ligament injury in April 2021. He still renewed his contract for a further year on 2 July, before returning to action with a goal in December.

Gómez was a regular starter for Segoviana in the 2022–23 season, scoring a career-best 12 goals. He left the club on 20 June 2023, and signed a one-year deal with Primera Federación side CF Fuenlabrada ten days later.

On 10 July 2024, after featuring sparingly, Gómez returned to Segoviana with the club now also in the third division. On 21 June of the following year, after suffering relegation, he agreed to a deal with CP Cacereño also in that category.

On 30 June 2026, Gómez was announced at fellow third tier side Gimnàstic de Tarragona on a two-year contract.
