= 2022–23 Segunda Federación =

Segunda Federación
- Season: 2022–23
- Dates: 3 September 2022 – 11 June 2023
- Promoted: Antequera; Arenteiro; Atlético Madrid B Atlético Sanluqueño; Melilla; Recreativo Granada; Recreativo Huelva; Sestao River; Tarazona; Teruel
- Relegated: Alcorcón B Alfaro; Arnedo; Atlético Mancha Real; Beasain; Bergantiños; Burgos Promesas; Cirbonero; Coria; Cristo Atlético; Diocesano; Don Benito; Ebro; El Ejido; Ibiza Islas Pitiusas; Juventud Torremolinos; Laredo; Leganés B UD Logroñés B Mallorca B Olot; Polvorín; Prat; Racing Rioja; Socuéllamos; Utrera; Xerez Deportivo
- Top goalscorer: Carlos Martín (18 goals)

The 2022–23 Segunda Federación season was the second season for the Segunda Federación, the fourth-highest level in the Spanish football league system. Ninety teams participate, divided into five groups of eighteen clubs each based on geographical proximity. In each group, the champions are automatically promoted to Primera Federación, and the second to fifth placers are qualified to the promotion play-offs. The last five teams in each group are relegated to the Tercera Federación; in addition, the four worst teams classified 13th in their group play in the relegation play-offs, to define the last two relegation places.

== Overview before the season ==
A total of 90 teams joined the league: ten relegated from the 2021–22 Primera División RFEF, 53 retained from the 2021–22 Segunda División RFEF and 27 promoted from the 2021–22 Tercera División RFEF.

Teams relegated from 2021–22 Primera División RFEF

- Atlético Sanluqueño
- Betis Deportivo
- Costa Brava
- Sevilla Atlético
- Tudelano
- UCAM Murcia
- Valladolid Promesas
- Zamora

Teams retained from 2021–22 Segunda División RFEF

- Alzira
- Antequera
- Arenas
- Arenteiro
- Atlético Mancha Real
- Avilés
- Bergantiños
- Brea
- Burgos Promesas
- Cacereño
- Cádiz B
- Compostela
- Coria
- Coruxo
- Cristo Atlético
- Don Benito
- Ebro
- El Ejido
- Espanyol B
- Formentera
- Gernika
- Gimnástica Segoviana
- Hércules
- Ibiza Islas Pitiusas
- Izarra
- Langreo
- Laredo
- Leganés B
- Lleida Esportiu
- UD Logroñés B
- Mar Menor
- Marino Luanco
- Melilla
- Montijo
- Mutilvera
- Navalcarnero
- Peña Deportiva
- Prat
- Racing Rioja
- Rayo Cantabria
- Real Sociedad C
- Recreativo Granada
- San Juan
- San Roque Lepe
- Sestao River
- Socuéllamos
- Tarazona
- Terrassa
- Teruel
- Unión Adarve
- Vélez
- Villanovense
- Xerez Deportivo

Teams promoted from 2021–22 Tercera División RFEF

- Alavés B
- Alcorcón B
- Alfaro
- Arnedo
- Atlético Madrid B
- Atlético Paso
- Atlético Saguntino
- Beasain
- Cartagena B
- Cirbonero
- Deportivo Aragón
- Diocesano
- Gimnástica Torrelavega
- Guadalajara
- Guijuelo
- Juventud Torremolinos
- Mallorca B
- Manresa
- Olot
- Ourense CF
- Oviedo Vetusta
- Polvorín
- Recreativo
- Utebo
- Utrera
- Valencia Mestalla
- Yeclano

Administrative promotions (Note: Extremadura UD was announced by the RFEF as a participating team in Group 5, although the club was dissolved on 28 February 2022. However, that place was occupied by CD Estepona FS on 20 August.)

- Cerdanyola del Vallès (in the place of Talavera de la Reina)
- Estepona (in the place of Extremadura)

== Groups ==
=== Group 1 ===
Location of teams in 2022–23 Segunda Federación – Group 1

==== Teams and locations ====
Team	Home city	Stadium	Capacity
Arenteiro	O Carballiño	Espiñedo	4,500
Avilés Industrial	Avilés	Román Suárez Puerta	5,400
Bergantiños	Carballo	As Eiroas	5,000
Burgos Promesas	Burgos	Castañares	500
Compostela	Santiago de Compostela	Vero Boquete	16,666
Coruxo	Vigo	O Vao	2,200
Cristo Atlético	Palencia	Nueva Balastera	8,100
Gimnástica Torrelavega	Torrelavega	El Malecón	6,007
Guijuelo	Guijuelo	Municipal de Guijuelo	1,500
Langreo	Langreo	Ganzábal	4,024
Laredo	Laredo	San Lorenzo	3,000
Marino Luanco	Luanco	Miramar	3,500
Ourense	Ourense	O Couto	5,659
Oviedo Vetusta	Oviedo	El Requexón	3,000
Polvorín	Lugo	O Polvorín	2,500
Rayo Cantabria	Santander	La Albericia	600
Valladolid Promesas	Valladolid	Anexos José Zorrilla	1,500
Zamora	Zamora	Ruta de la Plata	7,813

==== League table ====
Pos	Team	Pld	W	D	L	GF	GA	GD	Pts	Qualification
1	Arenteiro (C, P)	34	21	10	3	44	19	+25	73	Promotion to Primera Federación and qualification to Copa del Rey
2	Avilés Industrial	34	17	8	9	45	30	+15	59	Qualification for the promotion play-offs and Copa del Rey
3	Valladolid Promesas	34	16	8	10	49	41	+8	56	Qualification for the promotion play-offs
4	Compostela	34	14	12	8	42	27	+15	54 (Note: Head-to-head points: Compostela 8, Zamora 4, Guijuelo 4. Zamora finished ahead of Guijuelo on head-to-head goal difference: Zamora–Guijuelo 3–0, Guijuelo–Zamora 1–0)	Qualification for the promotion play-offs and Copa del Rey
5	Zamora	34	15	9	10	38	33	+5	54	Qualification for the promotion play-offs and Copa del Rey
6	Guijuelo	34	14	12	8	35	29	+6	54	Qualification for the Copa del Rey
7	Oviedo Vetusta	34	16	3	15	44	42	+2	51 (Note: Oviedo Vetusta finished ahead of Gimnástica Torrelavega on head-to-head points: Gimnástica Torrelavega–Oviedo Vetusta 2–1, Oviedo Vetusta–Gimnástica Torrelavega 2–0)	
8	Gimnástica Torrelavega	34	13	12	9	32	31	+1	51	
9	Marino Luanco	34	13	10	11	33	34	−1	49	
10	Rayo Cantabria	34	14	6	14	41	41	0	48	
11	Coruxo	34	11	13	10	36	29	+7	46	
12	Langreo	34	12	9	13	36	38	−2	45	
13	Ourense CF	34	11	10	13	36	36	0	43	Won the relegation play-offs
14	Cristo Atlético (R)	34	10	11	13	25	32	−7	41	Relegation to Tercera Federación
15	Laredo (R)	34	9	8	17	20	31	−11	35	Relegation to Tercera Federación
16	Burgos Promesas (R)	34	7	6	21	29	54	−25	27	Relegation to Tercera Federación
17	Polvorín (R)	34	5	11	18	30	47	−17	26	Relegation to Tercera Federación
18	Bergantiños (R)	34	4	10	20	33	54	−21	22	Relegation to Tercera Federación

Updated to match(es) played on 14 May 2023. Source:
Rules for classification: 1) points; 2) head-to-head points; 3) head-to-head goal difference; 4) goal difference; 5) number of goals scored
(C) Champions; (P) Promoted; (R) Relegated

==== Results ====
Home \ Away	ARE	AVI	BER	BUR	COM	COR	CRA	GIM	GUI	LAN	LAR	MAR	OUR	OVI	POL	RCA	VLD	ZAM
Arenteiro	—	1–1	1–1	2–1	0–1	2–1	1–0	0–0	5–1	0–1	1–0	1–0	1–0	1–0	1–0	3–1	1–0	1–1
Avilés	1–1	—	1–0	3–0	2–0	0–1	0–0	3–0	0–2	2–0	2–1	1–0	0–3	4–2	1–0	1–2	2–0	2–1
Bergantiños	2–3	3–1	—	0–2	1–2	1–1	0–1	1–2	1–1	4–4	0–1	1–1	1–0	0–2	0–0	0–1	0–1	1–3
Burgos Promesas	1–2	0–2	0–4	—	1–0	1–2	0–2	1–1	0–0	0–2	0–1	0–0	1–1	1–2	2–1	3–0	1–2	0–1
Compostela	1–3	4–0	0–0	2–1	—	1–1	3–0	1–0	0–0	0–1	1–0	1–1	2–1	0–0	0–0	1–0	2–0	1–1
Coruxo	0–0	0–2	3–0	1–2	1–0	—	0–0	1–1	0–1	0–1	1–0	2–2	1–1	1–0	3–1	1–2	2–2	1–1
Cristo Atlético	0–1	1–3	2–1	2–1	0–2	1–1	—	1–1	3–0	1–2	1–0	0–1	0–0	2–0	0–0	0–2	1–0	1–0
Gimnástica Torrelavega	1–2	1–1	1–0	1–0	1–1	0–0	0–0	—	2–2	2–1	1–0	0–1	1–0	2–1	2–1	2–0	0–0	0–0
Guijuelo	0–0	1–1	3–1	3–0	2–3	2–1	1–0	0–1	—	2–0	1–0	1–0	2–0	2–2	1–0	0–0	1–2	1–0
Langreo	0–0	1–1	1–1	2–0	0–3	0–0	2–0	3–1	0–2	—	1–2	1–3	3–1	3–0	1–2	0–0	1–1	0–0
Laredo	0–1	0–2	2–2	1–3	0–0	0–0	0–1	1–0	0–0	1–2	—	2–2	0–2	1–0	3–1	0–2	0–0	1–0
Marino Luanco	0–1	0–2	2–3	1–0	1–1	1–0	0–0	0–2	1–1	2–0	1–0	—	1–0	1–0	0–0	1–3	0–0	1–0
Ourense CF	1–1	2–0	1–0	4–3	1–1	0–2	0–0	1–2	1–0	1–0	1–1	0–1	—	1–2	1–1	1–2	1–0	0–1
Oviedo Vetusta	0–1	1–0	3–1	4–0	2–1	2–3	1–0	2–0	2–1	1–1	1–0	3–1	0–2	—	2–0	3–2	2–3	0–1
Polvorín	0–2	0–0	2–2	0–1	2–1	0–3	1–1	2–0	0–0	0–1	0–0	1–2	1–1	4–0	—	2–3	2–3	0–2
Rayo Cantabria	2–2	1–0	3–1	1–1	2–1	0–2	4–1	0–1	0–0	1–0	0–1	0–2	1–2	1–2	2–0	—	1–2	1–1
Valladolid Promesas	0–2	0–3	2–0	2–0	2–2	1–0	3–3	3–2	0–1	2–1	0–1	4–1	2–2	1–0	5–4	1–0	—	1–2
Zamora	1–0	1–1	1–0	2–2	0–3	1–0	1–0	1–1	3–0	2–0	1–0	3–2	2–3	0–2	1–2	3–1	0–4	—

Updated to match(es) played on 14 May 2023. Source:
Legend: Blue = home team win; Yellow = draw; Red = away team win.

==== Top scorers ====
Rank	Player	Club	Goal
1	(Spain) Carlos López	Bergantiños/Zamora	15
2	(Spain) Antón Escobar	Arenteiro	14
3	(Cameroon) Iván Cédric	Valladolid Promesas	13

=== Group 2 ===
Location of teams in 2022–23 Segunda Federación – Group 2

==== Teams and locations ====
Team	Home city	Stadium	Capacity
Alavés B	Vitoria	José Luis Compañón	2,500
Alfaro	Alfaro	La Molineta	4,000
Arenas	Getxo	Gobela	2,000
Arnedo	Arnedo	Sendero	5,000
Beasain	Beasain	Loinaz	6,000
Brea	Brea de Aragón	Piedrabuena	2,000
Cirbonero	Cintruénigo	San Juan	1,000
Gernika	Gernika-Lumo	Urbieta	3,000
Izarra	Estella-Lizarra	Merkatondoa	3,500
UD Logroñés Promesas	Logroño	Mundial 82	1,275
Mutilvera	Aranguren	Valle Aranguren	2,000
Racing Rioja	Logroño	El Salvador	1,160
Real Sociedad C	San Sebastián	José Luis Orbegozo	2,500
San Juan	Pamplona	San Juan	1,000
Sestao River	Sestao	Las Llanas	8,905
Tarazona	Tarazona	Municipal de Tarazona	5,000
Tudelano	Tudela	Ciudad de Tudela	11,000
Utebo	Utebo	Santa Ana	5,000

==== League table ====
Pos	Team	Pld	W	D	L	GF	GA	GD	Pts	Qualification
1	Sestao River (C, P)	34	20	12	2	55	17	+38	72	Promotion to Primera Federación and qualification to Copa del Rey
2	Alavés B	34	16	11	7	40	23	+17	59	Qualification for the promotion play-offs
3	Tarazona (P)	34	16	8	10	60	37	+23	56	Qualification for the promotion play-offs and Copa del Rey
4	Utebo	34	14	11	9	39	32	+7	53 (Note: Utebo finished ahead of Gernika on head-to-head points: Gernika–Utebo 0–2, Utebo–Gernika 0–0)	Qualification for the promotion play-offs and Copa del Rey
5	Gernika	34	15	8	11	41	31	+10	53	Qualification for the promotion play-offs and Copa del Rey
6	Tudelano	34	14	10	10	39	32	+7	52 (Note: Tudelano finished ahead of Real Sociedad C on head-to-head points: Tudelano–Real Sociedad C 2–1, Real Sociedad C–Tudelano 2–2)	Qualification for the Copa del Rey
7	Real Sociedad C	34	16	4	14	46	42	+4	52	
8	San Juan	34	13	12	9	33	27	+6	51	
9	Arenas	34	13	9	12	39	42	−3	48 (Note: Arenas finished ahead of Izarra on head-to-head points: Izarra–Arenas 1–2, Arenas–Izarra 3–1)	
10	Izarra	34	12	12	10	39	31	+8	48	
11	Mutilvera	34	14	4	16	44	37	+7	46	
12	Brea	34	12	8	14	27	33	−6	44	
13	Beasain (R)	34	10	11	13	40	40	0	41	Relegated in the relegation play-offs
14	Cirbonero (R)	34	10	10	14	35	40	−5	40	Relegation to Tercera Federación
15	Alfaro (R)	34	8	10	16	35	54	−19	34	Relegation to Tercera Federación
16	UD Logroñés B (R)	34	8	8	18	27	54	−27	32 (Note: Goal difference: UD Logroñés B -27, Racing Rioja -30)	Relegation to Tercera Federación
17	Racing Rioja (R)	34	8	8	18	27	57	−30	32	Relegation to Tercera Federación
18	Arnedo (R)	34	6	6	22	28	65	−37	24	Relegation to Tercera Federación

Updated to match(es) played on 14 May 2023. Source:
Rules for classification: 1) points; 2) head-to-head points; 3) head-to-head goal difference; 4) goal difference; 5) number of goals scored
(C) Champions; (P) Promoted; (R) Relegated

==== Results ====
Home \ Away	ALA	ALF	ARE	ARN	BEA	BRE	CIR	GER	IZA	LOG	MUT	RAR	RSO	SJU	SES	TAR	TUD	UTE
Alavés B	—	1–0	0–0	0–0	1–0	1–0	0–0	0–0	2–0	3–0	1–0	2–0	1–2	2–0	0–0	3–1	2–0	1–1
Alfaro	1–1	—	2–0	2–1	1–2	0–1	0–2	0–2	0–0	2–0	2–1	0–0	3–1	1–1	1–1	0–3	2–0	1–2
Arenas	1–2	0–0	—	4–1	1–0	2–1	2–3	0–2	3–1	5–1	0–0	1–0	1–0	0–0	1–1	3–3	0–3	1–0
Arnedo	0–4	1–4	0–0	—	2–2	0–1	0–2	1–0	1–4	3–1	0–4	2–0	1–0	1–2	1–2	0–0	0–2	1–1
Beasain	1–2	5–0	3–0	3–1	—	0–0	1–0	3–2	0–1	2–1	1–3	1–2	1–1	0–0	0–0	1–2	2–1	1–1
Brea	0–1	2–0	1–2	1–0	0–0	—	1–1	1–0	0–1	1–1	2–0	3–0	0–1	1–2	1–1	1–1	1–0	1–1
Cirbonero	2–2	2–3	2–0	3–2	1–3	0–1	—	1–1	1–2	1–0	1–0	2–0	1–2	0–2	0–0	1–3	0–0	0–2
Gernika	1–0	2–0	0–2	4–0	2–1	1–1	4–1	—	2–1	0–0	2–1	1–2	1–0	0–1	1–2	1–1	2–0	0–2
Izarra	4–0	2–0	1–2	3–1	0–0	0–1	0–0	1–2	—	2–0	1–0	3–1	2–1	1–1	0–0	1–1	0–0	0–2
UD Logroñés B	0–3	0–0	5–1	3–0	1–1	1–0	1–1	1–0	2–1	—	0–1	1–0	0–1	0–2	0–1	1–1	0–2	3–2
Mutilvera	2–0	4–2	1–0	0–3	3–0	4–1	0–1	0–1	1–1	0–0	—	1–0	1–2	1–0	1–1	3–1	0–1	5–1
Racing Rioja	2–2	1–1	0–2	0–4	1–1	2–0	1–0	1–1	0–0	2–1	1–0	—	1–2	1–0	0–3	2–0	1–3	1–2
Real Sociedad C	1–0	3–1	1–1	3–0	1–0	2–0	2–1	1–2	2–4	1–2	3–0	2–1	—	2–1	1–3	2–1	2–2	1–1
San Juan	2–1	2–2	2–1	1–1	1–0	2–0	1–1	0–1	1–1	2–0	0–1	1–1	1–0	—	1–1	2–0	0–0	1–0
Sestao River	1–1	2–1	3–1	3–0	2–0	0–1	2–1	2–0	1–1	6–0	2–0	4–0	3–1	2–0	—	1–0	2–0	1–0
Tarazona	0–1	6–1	3–0	4–0	1–1	0–1	1–0	1–1	2–0	5–0	3–2	3–1	2–1	3–1	2–1	—	4–1	0–2
Tudelano	0–0	1–1	0–0	1–0	1–2	3–1	0–2	3–2	0–0	2–1	0–2	7–1	2–1	1–0	0–0	1–0	—	1–0
Utebo	1–0	2–1	0–2	1–0	4–2	3–0	1–1	0–0	1–0	0–0	3–2	1–1	1–0	0–0	0–1	0–2	1–1	—

Updated to match(es) played on 13 May 2023. Source:
Legend: Blue = home team win; Yellow = draw; Red = away team win.

==== Top scorers ====
Rank	Player	Club	Goal
1	(Spain) Leandro	Sestao River	14
2	(Mali) Binke Diabaté	Cirbonero	13
3	(Guinea-Bissau) Marcos Mendes	Tarazona	12
3	(Argentina) Agustín Coscia	Tudelano	12

=== Group 3 ===
Location of teams in 2022–23 Segunda Federación – Group 3
Location of teams in 2022–23 Segunda Federación – Group 3 (Province of Barcelona)

==== Teams and locations ====
Team	Home city	Stadium	Capacity
Alzira	Alzira	Luis Suñer Picó	5,000
Atlético Saguntino	Sagunto	Nou Camp de Morvedre	4,000
Badalona	Badalona	Municipal	4,000
Deportivo Aragón	Zaragoza	Ciudad Deportiva	2,500
Ebro	Zaragoza	El Carmen	3,000
Espanyol B	Barcelona	Dani Jarque	1,520
Formentera	Sant Francesc Xavier, Formentera	Municipal	500
Hércules	Alicante	José Rico Pérez	30,000
Ibiza Islas Pitiusas	Ibiza	Can Misses	4,500
Lleida Esportiu	Lleida	Camp d'Esports	13,500
Mallorca B	Palma	Son Bibiloni	1,500
Manresa	Manresa	Nou Congost	3,000
Olot	Olot	Municipal d'Olot	3,000
Peña Deportiva	Santa Eulària des Riu	Municipal de Santa Eulària	1,500
Prat	El Prat de Llobregat	Sagnier	1,500
Terrassa	Terrassa	Olímpic	11,500
Teruel	Teruel	Pinilla	4,500
Valencia Mestalla	Paterna	Antonio Puchades	2,300

==== League table ====
Pos	Team	Pld	W	D	L	GF	GA	GD	Pts	Qualification
1	Teruel (C, P)	34	17	15	2	37	23	+14	66	Promotion to Primera Federación and qualification to Copa del Rey
2	Peña Deportiva	34	17	10	7	50	27	+23	61	Qualification for the promotion play-offs and Copa del Rey
3	Valencia Mestalla	34	16	10	8	50	28	+22	58	Qualification for the promotion play-offs
4	Manresa	34	14	12	8	40	32	+8	54	Qualification for the promotion play-offs and Copa del Rey
5	Espanyol B	34	14	11	9	39	37	+2	53	Qualification for the promotion play-offs
6	Terrassa	34	11	16	7	44	37	+7	49 (Note: Terrassa finished ahead of Hércules on head-to-head points: Terrassa-Hércules 3–1, Hércules-Terrassa 2–2)	Qualification for the Copa del Rey
7	Hércules	34	13	10	11	33	37	−4	49	Qualification for the Copa del Rey
8	Badalona Futur	34	12	11	11	37	39	−2	47 (Note: Badalona Futur finished ahead of Lleida Esportiu on head-to-head points: Lleida Esportiu-Badalona Futur 1–2, Badalona Futur-Lleida Esportiu 0–0)	
9	Lleida Esportiu	34	12	11	11	31	25	+6	47	
10	Atlético Saguntino	34	11	13	10	36	33	+3	46	
11	Formentera	34	12	9	13	37	35	+2	45 (Note: Formentera finished ahead of Alzira on head-to-head points: Alzira-Formentera 0–1, Formentera-Alzira 4–0)	
12	Alzira	34	12	9	13	41	44	−3	45	
13	Deportivo Aragón	34	11	10	13	36	42	−6	43	Won the relegation play-offs
14	Prat (R)	34	10	11	13	34	43	−9	41	Relegation to Tercera Federación
15	Olot (R)	34	7	11	16	26	38	−12	32	Relegation to Tercera Federación
16	Ibiza Islas Pitiusas (R)	34	6	11	17	32	50	−18	29 (Note: Ibiza Islas Pitiusas finished ahead of Mallorca B on head-to-head points: Ibiza Islas Pitiusas–Mallorca B 2–1, Mallorca B–Ibiza Islas Pitiusas 0–1)	Relegation to Tercera Federación
17	Mallorca B (R)	34	7	8	19	24	43	−19	29	Relegation to Tercera Federación
18	Ebro (R)	34	4	12	18	25	39	−14	24	Relegation to Tercera Federación

Updated to match(es) played on 14 May 2023. Source:
Rules for classification: 1) points; 2) head-to-head points; 3) head-to-head goal difference; 4) goal difference; 5) number of goals scored
(C) Champions; (P) Promoted; (R) Relegated

==== Results ====
Home \ Away	ALZ	SAG	BFU	ARA	EBR	ESP	FOR	HER	IIP	LLE	MLL	MAN	OLO	PDE	PRA	TRS	TRL	VAL
Alzira	—	0–0	1–0	2–1	3–1	1–0	0–1	0–0	3–0	2–2	2–0	1–1	2–1	1–2	1–2	0–0	0–1	3–2
Atlético Saguntino	1–0	—	0–0	1–0	0–0	1–1	0–1	2–3	1–1	4–0	1–0	3–1	1–0	3–3	1–0	1–4	1–1	1–1
Badalona Futur	1–0	1–1	—	2–0	2–0	1–1	3–2	0–1	3–1	0–0	1–0	0–0	2–0	3–1	0–2	0–0	0–1	1–2
Deportivo Aragón	1–1	1–0	4–1	—	2–1	1–2	2–3	1–1	1–0	1–0	2–1	1–0	1–1	1–4	0–0	1–0	1–1	1–1
Ebro	1–2	0–1	1–1	1–0	—	0–1	0–0	0–1	0–0	1–0	4–0	1–2	1–1	1–1	1–3	1–1	0–0	0–1
Espanyol B	1–1	2–2	3–1	0–0	3–1	—	1–0	1–0	1–0	0–2	0–2	1–2	1–0	1–0	0–0	3–4	1–0	0–6
Formentera	4–0	0–0	1–1	3–1	3–1	0–0	—	2–1	0–0	0–1	1–0	1–1	1–4	0–1	2–0	2–0	0–1	0–1
Hércules	0–1	2–1	1–1	3–1	0–0	2–1	1–0	—	2–1	0–4	2–2	1–1	0–2	2–1	1–0	2–2	0–2	0–1
Ibiza Islas Pitiusas	2–2	2–1	1–1	3–3	0–3	1–2	1–2	0–1	—	0–1	2–1	1–2	1–1	0–3	2–0	1–1	3–3	1–0
Lleida Esportiu	0–1	1–1	1–2	2–1	1–0	1–1	2–0	0–1	2–0	—	2–0	1–1	0–1	0–0	1–0	0–0	0–0	1–2
Mallorca B	2–3	0–2	1–0	1–1	1–0	0–2	2–1	0–0	0–1	2–1	—	0–2	2–0	1–1	2–2	2–2	0–1	1–0
Manresa	4–3	2–0	1–2	0–0	2–1	1–1	1–1	0–0	2–0	0–0	1–0	—	1–0	1–1	1–2	2–1	3–0	0–2
Olot	3–1	0–1	0–1	1–2	0–0	1–1	2–0	1–1	1–3	0–2	0–0	0–0	—	2–0	1–1	0–3	0–0	0–2
Peña Deportiva	2–1	1–0	5–0	0–1	1–1	0–1	0–0	2–0	2–1	0–0	2–0	2–0	1–0	—	4–1	3–1	1–1	1–0
Prat	2–1	1–3	1–2	0–1	1–1	2–1	2–1	0–2	2–2	1–2	1–0	3–1	3–1	1–3	—	0–0	0–0	0–0
Terrassa	1–1	2–1	2–2	1–0	1–0	2–1	1–2	3–1	2–1	1–1	1–0	1–3	2–0	0–1	1–1	—	0–0	0–0
Teruel	2–1	0–0	1–0	3–2	1–0	1–1	2–1	1–0	1–0	1–0	2–1	1–0	0–0	2–1	0–0	3–3	—	2–1
Valencia Mestalla	3–0	2–0	3–2	2–0	3–2	1–3	2–2	3–1	0–0	1–0	0–0	0–1	1–2	0–0	4–0	1–1	2–2	—

Updated to match(es) played on 14 May 2023. Source:
Legend: Blue = home team win; Yellow = draw; Red = away team win.

==== Top scorers ====
Rank	Player	Club	Goal
1	(Spain) Guillem Naranjo	Deportivo Aragón	12
2	(Spain) Alberto Marí	Valencia Mestalla	11
2	(Spain) Jordi Cano	Terrassa	11
2	(Spain) Ernest Forgàs	Olot	11

=== Group 4 ===
Location of teams in 2022–23 Segunda Federación – Group 4

==== Teams and locations ====
Team	Home city	Stadium	Capacity
Antequera	Antequera	El Maulí	6,000
Atlético Mancha Real	Mancha Real	La Juventud	1,500
Atlético Sanluqueño	Sanlúcar de Barrameda	El Palmar	5,000
Betis Deportivo	Seville	Luis del Sol	1,300
Cádiz B	Cádiz	Ramón Blanco Rodríguez	2,500
Cartagena B	Cartagena	Ciudad Jardín	2,000
El Ejido	El Ejido	Santo Domingo	7,870
Juventud Torremolinos	Torremolinos	El Pozuelo	3,000
Mar Menor	San Javier	Pitín	3,000
Recreativo Granada	Granada	Ciudad Deportiva	2,500
Recreativo Huelva	Huelva	Nuevo Colombino	21,670
San Roque Lepe	Lepe	Ciudad de Lepe	3,512
Sevilla Atlético	Seville	Jesús Navas	8,000
UCAM Murcia	Murcia	La Condomina	6,000
Utrera	Utrera	San Juan Bosco	3,000
Vélez	Vélez-Málaga	Vivar Téllez	2,100
Xerez Deportivo	Jerez de la Frontera	Chapín	20,523
Yeclano	Yecla	La Constitución	4,000

==== League table ====
Pos	Team	Pld	W	D	L	GF	GA	GD	Pts	Qualification
1	Antequera (C, P)	34	22	7	5	58	24	+34	73	Promotion to Primera Federación and qualification to Copa del Rey
2	Recreativo Huelva (P)	34	17	12	5	39	24	+15	63	Qualification for the promotion play-offs and Copa del Rey
3	Recreativo Granada (P)	34	17	8	9	47	32	+15	59	Qualification for the promotion play-offs
4	Atlético Sanluqueño (P)	34	16	10	8	47	33	+14	58	Qualification for the promotion play-offs and Copa del Rey
5	UCAM Murcia	34	13	15	6	46	27	+19	54	Qualification for the promotion play-offs and Copa del Rey
6	Yeclano	34	13	13	8	35	29	+6	52	Qualification for the Copa del Rey
7	San Roque Lepe	34	12	11	11	35	30	+5	47	
8	Mar Menor	34	12	9	13	32	36	−4	45 (Note: Mar Menor finished ahead of Cartagena B, Sevilla Atlético and Cádiz B on head-to-head points: Mar Menor 11 pts, Cartagena B 10 pts, Sevilla Atlético 5 pts, Cádiz B 5 pts)	
9	Cartagena B	34	12	9	13	38	42	−4	45	
10	Sevilla Atlético	34	13	6	15	36	31	+5	45	
11	Cádiz B	34	12	9	13	38	46	−8	45	
12	Betis Deportivo	34	11	11	12	34	35	−1	44 (Note: Betis Deportivo finished ahead of Vélez on head-to-head points: Betis Deportivo-Vélez 2-0, Vélez-Betis Deportivo 2-4)	
13	Vélez	34	13	5	16	41	52	−11	44	
14	Xerez Deportivo (R)	34	10	10	14	30	36	−6	40	Relegation to Tercera Federación
15	El Ejido (R)	34	11	6	17	34	41	−7	39	Relegation to Tercera Federación
16	Juventud Torremolinos (R)	34	8	10	16	30	40	−10	34	Relegation to Tercera Federación
17	Atlético Mancha Real (R)	34	8	7	19	26	48	−22	31	Relegation to Tercera Federación
18	Utrera (R)	34	5	4	25	27	67	−40	19	Relegation to Tercera Federación

Updated to match(es) played on 14 May 2023. Source:
Rules for classification: 1) points; 2) head-to-head points; 3) head-to-head goal difference; 4) goal difference; 5) number of goals scored
(C) Champions; (P) Promoted; (R) Relegated

==== Results ====
Home \ Away	ANT	AMR	ASL	BET	CAD	CAR	EJI	JTO	MMN	RGR	REC	SRL	SEV	UCM	UTR	VEL	XDE	YEC
Antequera	—	1–1	2–0	0–0	0–1	2–0	2–0	2–0	3–1	1–1	2–0	3–2	0–2	5–3	2–0	4–0	1–1	2–0
Atlético Mancha Real	1–2	—	1–1	1–1	0–1	1–3	0–2	0–4	3–1	0–1	0–1	1–0	1–0	0–0	2–1	1–1	2–1	1–2
Atlético Sanluqueño	4–2	2–1	—	2–0	2–0	1–0	3–2	0–0	1–1	0–0	1–1	4–3	1–0	1–0	4–0	2–0	1–2	2–0
Betis Deportivo	1–3	1–1	0–0	—	3–1	2–0	1–2	2–1	0–1	0–3	0–0	0–1	1–0	0–0	1–0	2–0	1–0	1–1
Cádiz Mirandilla	0–3	2–0	1–0	1–1	—	1–1	2–2	2–1	1–3	1–2	1–0	1–1	1–0	0–4	2–1	2–0	3–0	1–3
Cartagena B	0–1	3–0	2–1	0–1	1–1	—	1–0	2–3	1–1	1–1	2–2	1–1	1–0	1–0	3–2	2–1	0–1	0–0
El Ejido	0–2	0–1	1–2	1–0	0–2	2–1	—	0–1	0–1	1–1	0–0	0–3	2–0	0–1	5–0	1–3	2–1	0–1
Juventud Torremolinos	0–2	1–0	1–1	0–0	0–2	1–2	0–1	—	3–0	0–1	4–2	0–1	0–2	0–1	0–0	0–1	1–0	0–0
Mar Menor	0–2	1–0	1–0	1–0	2–0	1–2	0–1	0–0	—	4–1	0–1	2–1	1–0	0–0	1–0	1–3	0–0	0–0
Recreativo Granada	1–1	3–2	1–1	2–1	2–0	1–2	4–2	4–2	0–2	—	0–1	1–0	0–0	3–0	1–0	4–1	1–2	2–0
Recreativo Huelva	0–2	4–0	1–0	2–4	1–1	1–0	2–1	3–0	1–0	1–0	—	1–1	1–1	1–1	2–1	3–0	0–0	2–1
San Roque Lepe	0–1	0–2	0–0	1–0	1–1	2–0	0–0	0–0	1–0	1–2	0–1	—	1–0	1–2	3–0	1–0	1–1	1–1
Sevilla Atlético	1–2	3–1	2–3	0–0	1–0	1–1	3–1	1–0	2–2	1–0	0–0	1–2	—	2–0	2–0	2–1	1–2	2–1
UCAM Murcia	1–0	1–1	1–1	3–0	2–1	6–1	1–1	2–2	3–0	0–0	0–0	1–1	1–0	—	0–0	4–0	3–0	1–1
Utrera	2–3	1–0	1–2	1–4	2–1	3–2	0–2	1–2	2–1	3–1	0–0	0–1	0–4	1–1	—	2–4	0–2	0–3
Vélez	1–0	1–0	0–1	2–4	4–1	1–0	1–1	2–2	2–2	1–0	1–2	0–2	2–0	1–0	2–1	—	1–1	1–2
Xerez Deportivo	0–0	0–1	3–2	1–1	1–1	0–2	0–1	3–1	2–1	0–1	0–2	1–1	0–1	1–2	2–1	2–0	—	0–0
Yeclano	0–0	2–0	2–1	3–1	2–2	0–0	1–0	0–0	0–0	0–2	0–1	2–0	2–1	1–1	2–1	0–3	1–0	—

Updated to match(es) played on 14 May 2023. Source:
Legend: Blue = home team win; Yellow = draw; Red = away team win.

==== Top scorers ====
Rank	Player	Club	Goal
1	(Spain) Samu Omorodion	Recreativo Granada	14
2	(Argentina) Pablo Caballero	Recreativo Huelva	13
2	(Spain) Zequi	Atlético Sanluqueño	13
2	(Spain) Luismi	Vélez	13

=== Group 5 ===
Location of teams in 2022–23 Segunda Federación – Group 5
Location of teams of the 2022–23 Segunda Federación – Group 5 (Canary Islands)
Location of teams in 2022–23 Segunda Federación – Group 5 (Community of Madrid)

==== Teams and locations ====
Team	Home city	Stadium	Capacity
Alcorcón B	Alcorcón	Anexo de Santo Domingo	1,000
Atlético Madrid B	Majadahonda	Cerro del Espino	3,800
Atlético Paso	El Paso, La Palma	Municipal El Paso	5,000
Cacereño	Cáceres	Príncipe Felipe	7,000
Cerdanyola	Cerdanyola del Vallès	Fontetes	1,000
Coria	Coria	La Isla	3,000
Diocesano	Cáceres	Campos de La Federación	4,000
Don Benito	Don Benito	Vicente Sanz	3,500
Estepona	Estepona	Francisco Muñoz Pérez	3,800
Gimnástica Segoviana	Segovia	La Albuera	6,000
Guadalajara	Guadalajara	Pedro Escartín	8,000
Leganés B	Leganés	Instalación Deportiva Butarque	1,750
Melilla	Melilla	Álvarez Claro	10,000
Montijo	Montijo	Municipal	2,000
Navalcarnero	Navalcarnero	Mariano González	2,500
Socuéllamos	Socuéllamos	Paquito Jiménez	2,500
Unión Adarve	Madrid	Vicente del Bosque	1,500
Villanovense	Villanueva de la Serena	Romero Cuerda	5,000

==== League table ====
Pos	Team	Pld	W	D	L	GF	GA	GD	Pts	Qualification
1	Melilla (C, P)	34	18	12	4	41	15	+26	66	Promotion to Primera Federación and qualification to Copa del Rey
2	Atlético Madrid B (P)	34	19	8	7	60	33	+27	65	Qualification for the promotion play-offs
3	Navalcarnero	34	19	5	10	46	28	+18	62	Qualification for the promotion play-offs and Copa del Rey
4	Cacereño	34	15	10	9	35	23	+12	55	Qualification for the promotion play-offs and Copa del Rey
5	Gimnástica Segoviana	34	14	10	10	48	44	+4	52	Qualification for the promotion play-offs and Copa del Rey
6	Villanovense	34	13	11	10	29	25	+4	50	Qualification for the Copa del Rey
7	Guadalajara	34	12	12	10	49	35	+14	48	
8	Estepona	34	11	14	9	35	26	+9	47	
9	Unión Adarve	34	12	10	12	43	43	0	46	
10	Cerdanyola del Vallès	34	10	11	13	28	45	−17	41 (Note: Cerdanyola del Vallès finished ahead of Atlético Paso on head-to-head points: Atlético Paso-Cerdanyola del Vallès 1-1, Cerdanyola del Vallès-Atlético Paso 1-0)	
11	Atlético Paso	34	11	8	15	38	39	−1	41	
12	Montijo	34	10	9	15	33	47	−14	39 (Note: Montijo finished ahead of Coria on head-to-head points: Coria-Montijo 1-1, Montijo-Coria 2-0)	
13	Coria (R)	34	9	12	13	31	43	−12	39	Relegated in the relegation play-offs
14	Leganés B (R)	34	8	13	13	31	39	−8	37	Relegation to Tercera Federación
15	Alcorcón B (Note: Alcorcón B was awarded a 0–3 win in their Round 2 match against Diocesano after the latter fielded an ineligible player. The match had originally ended 1–1.) (R)	34	7	14	13	34	42	−8	35	Relegation to Tercera Federación
16	Diocesano (R)	34	8	10	16	33	43	−10	34	Relegation to Tercera Federación
17	Socuéllamos (R)	34	7	12	15	25	41	−16	33	Relegation to Tercera Federación
18	Don Benito (R)	34	7	11	16	19	47	−28	32	Relegation to Tercera Federación

Updated to match(es) played on 14 May 2023. Source:
Rules for classification: 1) points; 2) head-to-head points; 3) head-to-head goal difference; 4) goal difference; 5) number of goals scored
(C) Champions; (P) Promoted; (R) Relegated

==== Results ====
Home \ Away	ALC	ATM	ATP	CAC	CER	COR	DIO	DBE	EST	GMS	GUA	LEG	MEL	MON	NAV	SOC	UAD	VIL
Alcorcón B	—	3–3	0–0	0–3	0–0	2–0	1–0	0–1	1–2	2–2	1–2	1–2	0–0	0–2	1–2	0–0	0–0	1–1
Atlético Madrid B	1–1	—	3–2	1–0	4–0	3–1	1–0	4–0	1–0	2–1	2–1	2–0	0–0	4–2	0–1	3–0	2–0	3–0
Atlético Paso	1–1	2–4	—	2–0	1–1	0–2	3–0	2–0	0–1	3–1	1–0	1–0	1–1	2–0	2–1	2–0	4–2	0–1
Cacereño	1–1	3–0	1–0	—	0–0	2–0	3–0	0–0	0–0	2–2	1–4	2–1	0–0	2–0	1–0	2–1	0–1	1–0
Cerdanyola del Vallès	0–1	1–4	1–0	1–0	—	0–0	1–2	0–0	3–2	4–2	1–1	1–1	0–2	2–0	0–3	2–0	1–3	0–1
Coria	3–4	2–2	0–0	0–1	0–2	—	2–0	0–1	1–1	1–1	2–0	0–0	1–1	1–1	1–1	3–3	1–0	1–0
Diocesano	0–3 (Note: Alcorcón awarded a 0–3 win after Diocesano fielded an ineligible player. The match had originally ended 1–1.)	2–0	1–1	0–0	0–1	0–1	—	4–0	0–1	1–1	1–2	2–3	2–1	3–2	3–4	0–1	1–1	0–0
Don Benito	2–1	2–2	1–0	2–3	0–1	0–1	0–3	—	0–2	0–0	0–6	1–0	0–2	0–0	2–4	0–2	0–2	0–0
Estepona	1–1	1–2	3–1	0–0	1–1	0–1	0–1	0–0	—	2–0	1–1	1–2	1–0	0–1	3–1	0–0	3–1	2–0
Gimnástica Segoviana	4–2	1–0	2–1	1–5	3–0	3–0	1–0	0–0	0–0	—	2–1	2–2	2–1	3–2	0–1	3–2	2–0	0–0
Guadalajara	1–1	1–4	1–1	0–1	0–0	4–0	2–0	0–0	0–0	3–1	—	2–0	0–1	3–1	1–1	3–0	0–2	0–2
Leganés B	1–0	0–0	2–1	0–1	1–2	1–1	0–0	0–0	2–2	1–3	3–3	—	1–0	2–0	0–1	1–0	0–2	1–2
Melilla	2–0	2–0	2–0	2–0	2–0	2–1	3–1	3–0	0–0	1–0	1–1	0–0	—	1–0	0–0	3–0	1–0	1–1
Montijo	0–3	2–1	0–1	1–0	3–0	2–0	1–1	1–1	0–0	1–2	1–1	0–0	1–2	—	2–0	1–1	1–0	2–1
Navalcarnero	0–1	1–0	2–0	1–0	4–0	2–0	1–3	1–0	0–0	0–0	0–2	2–1	0–1	5–0	—	1–3	1–0	1–0
Socuéllamos	0–0	1–2	1–0	0–0	0–0	0–0	0–0	3–2	1–3	0–2	0–0	1–0	0–0	0–2	0–1	—	1–1	0–1
Unión Adarve	2–1	0–0	3–3	0–0	2–0	2–1	2–2	0–3	2–1	2–0	1–3	3–3	2–2	4–0	0–3	3–2	—	0–0
Villanovense	3–0	0–0	1–0	2–0	2–2	2–3	0–0	0–1	2–1	2–1	2–0	0–0	0–1	1–1	1–0	0–2	1–0	—

Updated to match(es) played on 13 May 2023. Source:
Legend: Blue = home team win; Yellow = draw; Red = away team win.

==== Top scorers ====
Rank	Player	Club	Goal
1	(Spain) Carlos Martín	Atlético Madrid B	18
2	(Equatorial Guinea) Dorian Jr.	Leganés B	13
3	(Spain) Diego Gómez	Gimnástica Segoviana	12

=== Ranking of 13th-place teams ===
Pos	Team	Pld	W	D	L	GF	GA	GD	Pts	Qualification or relegation
1	Vélez	34	13	5	16	41	52	−11	44	
2	Ourense CF (O)	34	11	10	13	36	36	0	43	Qualification for the relegation play-offs
3	Deportivo Aragón (O)	34	11	10	13	36	42	−6	43	Qualification for the relegation play-offs
4	Beasain (R)	34	10	11	13	40	40	0	41	Qualification for the relegation play-offs
5	Coria (R)	34	9	12	13	31	43	−12	39	Qualification for the relegation play-offs

Updated to match(es) played on 14 May 2023. Source:
Rules for classification: 1) points; 2) goal difference; 3) number of goals scored
(O) Play-off winners; (R) Relegated

== See also ==
- 2022–23 La Liga
- 2022–23 Segunda División
- 2022–23 Primera Federación
- 2022–23 Tercera Federación
