= Guido Ratto =

Argentine footballer (born 1999)

Personal information
- Full name: Guido Marcelo Ratto Canziani
- Date of birth: 8 June 1999 (age 27)
- Place of birth: Buenos Aires, Argentina
- Height: 1.75 m (5 ft 9 in)
- Position: Midfielder

Team information
- Current team: Lleida Esportiu
- Number: 19

Youth career
- 2008–2010: Valencia
- 2010–2018: Levante

Senior career*
| Years | Team | Apps | (Gls) |
| 2018–2019 | Gibraltar United | 12 | (2) |
| 2020–2021 | Slavia Mozyr | 2 | (0) |
| 2022 | Prat | 9 | (1) |
| 2022–2023 | Monzón | 23 | (2) |
| 2023–2025 | Binéfar | 66 | (6) |
| 2025– | Lleida Esportiu | 7 | (0) |
- * Club domestic league appearances and goals as of 23 November 2025

Guido Marcelo Ratto Canziani (born 8 June 1999) is an Argentine professional footballer who plays as a midfielder for Spanish club Lleida CF.
