= Lleida CF =

Association football club in Spain

- Full name: Lleida Club de Futbol
- Nicknames: Els Blaus, Lleidatans, Els de la Terra Ferma
- Founded: 2011; 15 years ago
- Ground: Camp d'Esports, Lleida, Catalonia, Spain
- Capacity: 13,500
- President: Luis Pereira
- Head coach: Jordi Cortés
- League: Lliga Elit
- 2025–26: Tercera Federación – Group 5, 18th of 18 (relegated)
- Website: lleidacf.cat
Home colours	Away colours	Third colours

Lleida Club de Futbol is a Spanish football team based in Lleida, in the autonomous community of Catalonia. Founded in July 2011, it plays in Lliga Elit, holding home games at Camp d'Esports, with a capacity of 13,500 seats.

== History ==
Club crest between 2011 and 2024

In mid-May 2011, historic club Unió Esportiva Lleida was liquidated due to a €27.2 million debt. Its berth was auctioned and acquired by an entrepreneur from Lleida, Sisco Pujol, who created the new Lleida Esportiu, which started competing in Segunda División B; the club was also scheduled to take part in the 2011–12 Copa del Rey, in place of Unió Esportiva. Emili Vicente, the last manager of the previous club, was the first manager of the new one.

Esportiu played its first friendly game on 6 August 2011, with Poblade Mafumet (2–0); fifteen days later the team played its first official match, losing 1–3 at home to Reus. The cup campaign ended in the first round with a loss by the same score at Andorra. In 2013, just in their second season, Lleida played for the first time the promotion playoffs to Segunda División, as they did a year later, losing respectively to Real Jaén and Leganés; Toni Seligrat led the team in both seasons. In 2016, their third try in four years, the team lost in the playoff final to Sevilla Atlético, after a penalty shootout.

In the 2017–18 Copa del Rey, Lleida reached for the first time the round of 16 after eliminating top-level side Real Sociedad, by overcoming a disadvantage of three goals in the aggregate score in the previous round. In their first appearance in the round of 16, the club was eliminated by Atlético Madrid 7–0 on aggregate.

After a league restructuring, Lleida ended up in the new fourth-tier Segunda Federación for the 2021–22 season. In a first playoff for six years, the club lost to the seeded Sestao River Club after a goalless draw on 21 May.

In April 2024, Lleida Esportiu announced a name change to Lleida Club de Futbol to avoid legal issues. In July 2025, the club was administratively relegated to the Tercera Federación (fifth-tier) due to various non-payment issues. Another relegation followed in the following year, with the club entering a liquidation process in June 2026.

On 2 July 2026, Lleida CF announced that Lleida 1939, a new project starting in the Quarta Catalana, had acquired the brand, social media and historic trophies of the club, also including the historic accolades of UE Lleida.

== Season to season ==
Season	Tier	Division	Place	Copa del Rey
2011–12	3	2ª B	7th	First round
2012–13	3	2ª B	4th	Second round
2013–14	3	2ª B	3rd	Round of 32
2014–15	3	2ª B	5th	Third round
2015–16	3	2ª B	4th	Third round
2016–17	3	2ª B	8th	Second round
2017–18	3	2ª B	7th	Round of 16
2018–19	3	2ª B	6th	Third round
2019–20	3	2ª B	5th	First round
2020–21	3	2ª B	7th / 4th	First round
2021–22	4	2ª RFEF	5th	
2022–23	4	2ª Fed.	9th	First round
2023–24	4	2ª Fed.	5th	
2024–25	4	2ª Fed.	13th	First round
2025–26	5	3ª Fed.	18th	
2026–27	6	Lliga Elit		

- 10 seasons in Segunda División B
- 4 seasons in Segunda Federación/Segunda División RFEF
- 1 season in Tercera Federación

=== Detailed list of seasons ===
Season	League											Cup	Other cups		Top scorer (Note: All goals scored in league games, not including playoffs.)	
Season	Tier	Division	Gr	Pos	Pld	W	D	L	GF	GA	Pts	Cup	Other cups		Name(s)	Goal
2011–12	3	Segunda División B	3	7th	38	16	11	11	50	40	59	R1	Copa Federación	R32	(Spain) Asier Eizaguirre	10
2012–13	3	Segunda División B	2	4th	38	17	15	6	56	34	66	R2	Copa Catalunya	R2.3	(Spain) Jaime Mata	14
2012–13	3	Segunda División B	PO		4	1	3	0	5	4		R2	Copa Catalunya	R2.3	(Spain) Jaime Mata	14
2013–14	3	Segunda División B	3	3rd	38	19	11	8	52	35	68	R32	Copa Catalunya	R2.1	(Spain) Jaime Mata	15
2013–14	3	Segunda División B	PO		4	1	2	1	3	3		R32	Copa Catalunya	R2.1	(Spain) Jaime Mata	15
2014–15	3	Segunda División B	3	5th	38	18	7	13	45	34	61	R3	Copa Catalunya	R1	(Spain) Salva Chamorro	14
2015–16	3	Segunda División B	3	4th	38	18	13	7	49	22	67	R3	Copa Catalunya	R2	(Spain) Manuel Onwu	10
2015–16	3	Segunda División B	PO		6	4	1	1	7	2		R3	Copa Catalunya	R2	(Spain) Manuel Onwu	10
2016–17	3	Segunda División B	3	8th	38	15	11	12	41	41	56	R2	Copa Catalunya	R3	(Spain) Javi Casares	8
2017–18	3	Segunda División B	3	7th	38	14	13	11	37	33	55	R16	Copa Catalunya	R1	(Spain) Jorge Félix	10
2018–19	3	Segunda División B	3	6th	38	15	11	12	46	39	56	R3	Copa Catalunya	R3	(Spain) Pedro Martín	16
2019–20	3	Segunda División B	3	5th	28	12	10	6	34	22	46	R1	Copa Catalunya	R2	(Spain) Xemi Fernández	8
2020–21	3	Segunda División B	3	10th	26	10	5	11	28	28	35	R1	—	—	(Spain) Raúl González	9
2021–22	4	Segunda División RFEF	3	5th	34	15	7	12	38	39	52	—	Copa Federación	QF	(Spain) Joel Febas	10
2021–22	4	Segunda División RFEF	PO		1	0	1	0	0	0		—	Copa Federación	QF	(Spain) Joel Febas	10
2022–23	4	Segunda Federación	3	9th	34	12	11	11	31	25	47	R1	Copa Catalunya	R1	(Spain) Chuli	7
2023–24	4	Segunda Federación	3	5th	34	18	4	12	45	31	58	—	Copa Federación	R32	(Spain) Chuli	11
2023–24	4	Segunda Federación	PO		2	0	0	2	0	3		—	Copa Federación	R32	(Spain) Chuli	11
2024–25	4	Segunda Federación	3	13th	34	9	18	7	38	30	45	R1	Copa Catalunya	R7	(Spain) Unai García	8

== Players ==
=== Current squad ===
Note: Flags indicate national team as defined under FIFA eligibility rules; some limited exceptions apply. Players may hold more than one non-FIFA nationality.

No.	Pos.	Nation	Player
1	GK	ESP	Alejandro Satoca
2	DF	ESP	Marc Alegre
3	DF	NED	Boaz Hallebeek
4	DF	ESP	Toni Escobedo
5	MF	ESP	Joan Rusiñol
6	MF	ESP	Toni Martí
7	MF	ESP	Jorge Revert
9	MF	ESP	Pau Russo
10	MF	ESP	Xavier Puiggròs
11	MF	ESP	Aleix León
12	DF	ESP	Óscar Rubio

No.	Pos.	Nation	Player
13	GK	ESP	Antonio Olivera
15	FW	ESP	Jordi Puig
16	MF	ESP	Jaume Viladegut
17	DF	AND	Marc García
18	MF	POR	Luís Silva
19	FW	ARG	Guido Ratto
20	DF	ESP	David García
21	MF	ARG	Sasha Litwin
22	DF	ARG	Matías Sempé
23	FW	ARG	Fran Magno
—	FW	JPN	Haruto Kimura

=== Youth Academy ===
Note: Flags indicate national team as defined under FIFA eligibility rules; some limited exceptions apply. Players may hold more than one non-FIFA nationality.

No.	Pos.	Nation	Player
25	DF	ESP	Félix Perea

== Records ==
- Record league victory: 0–6 vs. Atlético Baleares (3 April 2016)
- Record league defeat: 5–1 vs. Villarreal B (3 October 2015), 4–0 vs. Sabadell (21 December 2019)
- Record attendance: 13,700 vs. Sevilla Atlético, Segunda División B Play-off (19 June 2016)
- Most league appearances: 193, Pau Torres (2012–2015, 2018–2021)
- Most league goals scored: 29, Jaime Mata (2012–14)
- Most goals scored, season: 19, Pedro Martín (2018–19)
- Highest league position: 3rd in Segunda División B (2014)
- Copa del Rey best: Round of 16 (2017–18)
- Record consecutive league appearances: 88, Pau Torres (August 2012 – November 2014), Iñaki Álvarez (December 2022 – May 2025)
- Youngest player: Òscar Canadell, 17 years and 158 days (against Ontinyent, 6 April 2014)
- Oldest player: Óscar Rubio, 41 years and 191 days (against Cornellà, 23 November 2025)

== Coaches ==
Statistics are correct as of 23 November 2025.

Name	Nationality	From	To	Matches	Won	Drawn	Lost	GF	GA	Win %	Notes
Emili Vicente	Spain	23 July 2011	30 June 2012	38	16	11	11	50	40	42.1	
Toni Seligrat	Spain	1 July 2012	30 June 2014	76	36	26	14	108	69	47.4	
Imanol Idiakez	Spain	1 July 2014	30 June 2016	76	36	20	20	93	56	47.4	
Gustavo Siviero	Argentina	13 July 2016	16 May 2017	38	15	11	12	41	41	39.5	
Gerard Albadalejo	Spain	31 May 2017	3 February 2019	61	24	21	16	70	59	39.3	
Juan Carlos Oliva	Spain	5 February 2019	3 June 2019	15	5	3	7	13	13	33.3	
Molo	Spain	5 June 2019	24 May 2021	54	22	15	17	63	50	40.7	
Gabri	Spain	1 June 2021	25 May 2022	34	15	7	12	38	39	44.1	
Pere Martí	Spain	9 June 2022	21 December 2022	15	4	4	7	13	12	26.7	
Toni Seligrat	Spain	28 December 2022	2 February 2023	4	1	2	1	3	3	25	
Ángel Viadero	Spain	3 February 2023	6 June 2024	49	25	9	15	60	41	51	
Marc García	Spain	7 June 2024	3 March 2025	25	8	14	3	33	19	32	
Iñigo Idiakez	Spain	4 March 2025	2 June 2025	9	1	4	4	5	11	11.1	
Jordi Cortés	Spain	25 July 2025	Present	12	1	4	7	5	16	8.3	
