= Supercopa de Catalunya =

- Founded: 2014; 12 years ago
- Region: Catalonia
- Teams: 2
- Current champions: Girona (1st title)
- Most championships: Barcelona (2 titles)
- Website: www.fcf.cat

The Supercopa de Catalunya (Catalonia Supercup) is a football supercup competition organised by the Catalan Football Federation since 2014 for football clubs in the Catalonia autonomous community of Spain. The match features the two best ranked Catalan clubs from La Liga.

== Matches ==
Year	Date	Venue	Winner	Scores	Runner up	Att.	Ref
2014	29 October 2014	Estadi Montilivi, Girona	Barcelona	1–1 (4–2 p)	Espanyol	5,110	
2016	25 October 2016	Nou Estadi, Tarragona	Espanyol	1–0	Barcelona	12,810	
2018	7 March 2018	Camp d'Esports, Lleida	Barcelona	0–0 (4–2 p)	Espanyol	10,576	
2019	6 March 2019	Nova Creu Alta, Sabadell	Girona	1–0	Barcelona	10,722	

=== 2014 ===
The 2014 match was the first ever Supercopa de Catalunya, after the CFC (Catalan Football Federation) changed the format for the Copa Catalunya. Second and third division clubs (as well as the winner of the Catalan First Division) were able to participate in the old tournament, while Barcelona and Espanyol played this one-off match for the Super Cup.

Gerard Piqué opened the scoring for Barcelona after heading in Luis Suárez's cross in the 15th minute. Despite dominating the game from start to finish, Barcelona were not able to add to Piqué's goal and Espanyol eventually equalised through a perfectly taken free kick from Anaitz Arbilla. The game then went to a penalty shootout, which Barcelona won 4-2: Xavi Hernández, Alen Halilović, Álex Grimaldo and Ivan Rakitić all scored, while Jordi Masip saved Arbilla's penalty and Abraham González missed for Espanyol.

=== 2018 ===
The match between Barcelona and Espanyol ended goalless after 90 minutes and went to a penalty shootout. Álex López and Mario Hermoso both scored for Espanyol but Sergi Darder and José Manuel Jurado missed, while all of Barcelona's takers (Paco Alcácer, Sergi Palencia, Yerry Mina, and Abel Ruiz) scored and the shootout ended with a 4-2 win for Barcelona. Marcus McGuane became the first English player to represent Barcelona since Gary Lineker 29 years earlier, after coming on for Aleix Vidal in the 77th minute.

=== 2019 ===
Girona CF won their first ever professional title defeating FC Barcelona in the Nova Creu Alta in Sabadell after Christian Stuani scored from the penalty spot in the 69th minute, just after he and Portu were introduced by manager Eusebio Sacristán. Ernesto Valverde fielded a second-string lineup, with World Cup winner Samuel Umtiti as the biggest name in the side and Jean-Clair Todibo making his debut for the Catalan giants. Pedro Porro and Aleix García started in the winning team, with Douglas Luiz coming on after half-time but lasting only a few minutes in the pitch due to an injury.

== Winners ==
Team	Winners	Editions	Runners-up	Editions
Barcelona	2	2014, 2018	2	2016, 2019
Espanyol	1	2016	2	2014, 2018
Girona	1	2019	0	—

== See also ==
- Copa Catalunya
- Copa del Rey
- Euskal Herriko Futbol Txapelketa
