= FC Ascó =

Association football club in Spain

Ascó
- Full name: Futbol Club Ascó
- Founded: 2010; 16 years ago
- Ground: Municipal, Ascó, Catalonia, Spain
- Capacity: 1,500
- President: Miquel Pérez
- Head coach: Miquel Aguza
- League: Primera Catalana – Group 3
- 2025–26: Primera Catalana – Group 3, 7th of 16
Home colours	Away colours

Futbol Club Ascó is a Spanish football team based in Ascó, in the autonomous community of Catalonia. Founded in 2010 it plays in Primera Catalana – Group 3, holding home matches at Estadio Municipal, which has a capacity of 1,500 spectators.

== History ==
Ascó was founded in 2010 as the result of a merger between CFJE Ascó EF and FC Benavent. It immediately started competing in Tercera División, the first national category, being relegated in that first year and returning in 2013.

== Season to season ==
Season	Tier	Division	Place	Copa del Rey
2010–11	4	3ª	19th	
2011–12	5	1ª Cat.	8th	
2012–13	5	1ª Cat.	1st	
2013–14	4	3ª	6th	
2014–15	4	3ª	1st	
2015–16	4	3ª	4th	First round
2016–17	4	3ª	6th	
2017–18	4	3ª	7th	
2018–19	4	3ª	20th	
2019–20	5	1ª Cat.	9th	
2020–21	5	1ª Cat.	1st	
2021–22	5	3ª RFEF	16th	
2022–23	6	1ª Cat.	12th	
2023–24	7	1ª Cat.	9th	
2024–25	7	1ª Cat.	10th	
2025–26	7	1ª Cat.		

- 8 seasons in Tercera División
- 1 season in Tercera División RFEF

== Notable coaches ==
- (Croatia) Mauro Ravnić
- (Spain) Miguel Ángel Rubio
- (Spain) Josep Ferré

== Notable players ==
- (Spain) Gerard Badía – Poland Ekstraklasa champion with Piast Gliwice
