= UE Vilassar de Mar =

Spanish association football club

Vilassar de Mar
- Full name: Unió Esportiva Vilassar de Mar
- Founded: 6 June 1923; 103 years ago
- Ground: Xevi Ramon, Vilassar de Mar, Catalonia, Spain
- Capacity: 3,000
- President: Francesc Tolrà i Gel
- Head coach: Alberto Aybar
- League: Tercera Federación – Group 5
- 2025–26: Tercera Federación – Group 5, 13th of 18
Home colours	Away colours

Unió Esportiva Vilassar de Mar is a Spanish football club based in Vilassar de Mar, in the autonomous community of Catalonia. Founded in 1923 it currently plays in Tercera Federación – Group 5, holding home matches at Estadi Municipal Xevi Ramon, with a 3,000-seat capacity.

Vilassar's colors are red and white. They are the second reserve team of RCD Espanyol.

== History ==
The club was founded on 6 June 1923, with Joaquim Carreras as its first president. On 1 July 2025, Vilassar agreed to become RCD Espanyol's second reserve team ahead of the 2025–26 season.

== Season to season ==
Season	Tier	Division	Place	Copa del Rey
1947–48	6	2ª Reg.	10th	
1948–49	6	2ª Reg.	4th	
1949–50	6	2ª Reg.	3rd	
1950–51	5	1ª Reg. B	4th	
1951–52	5	1ª Reg. B	13th	
1952–53	5	1ª Reg. B	16th	
1953–54	5	2ª Reg.	10th	
1954–55	5	2ª Reg.	13th	
1955–56	5	2ª Reg.	14th	
1956–57	5	2ª Reg.	8th	
1957–58	4	1ª Reg.	13th	
1958–59	4	1ª Reg.	12th	
1959–60	4	1ª Reg.	15th	
1960–61	4	1ª Reg.	9th	
1961–62	4	1ª Reg.	10th	
1962–63	4	1ª Reg.	18th	
1963–64	5	2ª Reg.	7th	
1964–65	5	2ª Reg.	5th	
1965–66	5	2ª Reg.	10th	
1966–67	5	2ª Reg.	5th	

Season	Tier	Division	Place	Copa del Rey
1967–68	5	2ª Reg.	3rd	
1968–69	5	1ª Reg.	17th	
1969–70	5	1ª Reg.	17th	
1970–71	6	2ª Reg.	14th	
1971–72	6	2ª Reg.	12th	
1972–73	6	2ª Reg.	16th	
1973–74	6	2ª Reg.	10th	
1974–75	6	2ª Reg.	17th	
1975–76	7	3ª Reg.	5th	
1976–77	7	3ª Reg.	2nd	
1977–78	8	3ª Reg.	2nd	
1978–79	8	3ª Reg.	5th	
1979–80	8	3ª Reg.	4th	
1980–81	8	3ª Reg.	6th	
1981–82	8	3ª Reg.	1st	
1982–83	7	2ª Reg.	11th	
1983–84	7	2ª Reg.	12th	
1984–85	7	2ª Reg.	2nd	
1985–86	7	2ª Reg.	1st	
1986–87	6	1ª Reg.	4th	

Season	Tier	Division	Place	Copa del Rey
1987–88	6	1ª Reg.	4th	
1988–89	6	1ª Reg.	4th	
1989–90	6	1ª Reg.	1st	
1990–91	5	Reg. Pref.	11th	
1991–92	6	Pref. Terr.	2nd	
1992–93	5	1ª Cat.	16th	
1993–94	5	1ª Cat.	14th	
1994–95	5	1ª Cat.	6th	
1995–96	5	1ª Cat.	3rd	
1996–97	4	3ª	13th	
1997–98	4	3ª	11th	
1998–99	4	3ª	14th	
1999–2000	5	1ª Cat.	3rd	
2000–01	4	3ª	6th	
2001–02	4	3ª	8th	
2002–03	4	3ª	8th	
2003–04	4	3ª	16th	
2004–05	4	3ª	18th	
2005–06	5	1ª Cat.	9th	
2006–07	5	1ª Cat.	9th	

Season	Tier	Division	Place	Copa del Rey
2007–08	5	1ª Cat.	11th	
2008–09	5	1ª Cat.	8th	
2009–10	5	1ª Cat.	17th	
2010–11	5	1ª Cat.	7th	
2011–12	5	1ª Cat.	2nd	
2012–13	4	3ª	14th	
2013–14	4	3ª	17th	
2014–15	4	3ª	20th	
2015–16	5	1ª Cat.	1st	
2016–17	4	3ª	10th	
2017–18	4	3ª	20th	
2018–19	5	1ª Cat.	1st	
2019–20	4	3ª	7th	
2020–21	4	3ª	2nd	
2021–22	5	3ª RFEF	11th	
2022–23	5	3ª Fed.	14th	
2023–24	5	3ª Fed.	3rd	
2024–25	5	3ª Fed.	16th	
2025–26	5	3ª Fed.	13th	N/A (Note: Second reserve team of Espanyol.)
2026–27	5	3ª Fed.		N/A

- 15 seasons in Tercera División
- 6 seasons in Tercera Federación/Tercera División RFEF
