= UE Castelldefels =

Spanish association football club

Castelldefels
- Full name: Unió Esportiva Castelldefels
- Founded: 15 April 1948; 78 years ago
- Ground: Els Canyars, Castelldefels, Catalonia, Spain
- Capacity: 2,500
- Chairman: Adolfo Borgoño
- Manager: Miki Carrillo
- League: Lliga Elit
- 2025–26: Lliga Elit, 7th of 16
Home colours	Away colours

Unió Esportiva Castelldefels is a Spanish football team based in Castelldefels, in the autonomous community of Catalonia. Founded in 1948 it currently plays in Lliga Elit, holding home matches at Municipal Els Canyars, with a capacity for 2,500 spectators.

== History ==
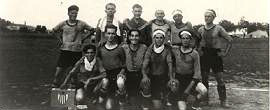
Football team in Castelldefels before the official foundation of the UE Castelldefels, 1932

The club was officially founded on 15 April 1948. Francisco Casacuberta, who was then the Mayor of Castelldefels, became its first president. The first kit for the team was originally red and white shirt and white shorts. It eventually moved to a yellow shirt with blue shorts.

In the 2007–08, the club served as the reserve team of UE Miapuesta Castelldefels, team moved from Figueres to the city who played in Segunda División B. The agreement only lasted one season.

== Season to season ==
Season	Tier	Division	Place	Copa del Rey
1948–1960	—	Regional	—	
1960–61	5	2ª Reg.	11th	
1961–62	5	2ª Reg.		
1962–63	5	2ª Reg.	4th	
1963–64	5	2ª Reg.	16th	
1964–65	6	3ª Reg.		
1965–66	5	2ª Reg.	13th	
1966–67	5	2ª Reg.	8th	
1967–68	5	2ª Reg.	4th	
1968–69	5	1ª Reg.	14th	
1969–70	5	1ª Reg.	9th	
1970–71	5	1ª Reg.	10th	
1971–72	5	1ª Reg.	12th	
1972–73	5	1ª Reg.	14th	
1973–74	5	1ª Reg.	19th	
1974–75	6	2ª Reg.	3rd	
1975–76	6	2ª Reg.	4th	
1976–77	6	2ª Reg.	2nd	
1977–78	6	1ª Reg.	6th	
1978–79	6	1ª Reg.	20th	

Season	Tier	Division	Place	Copa del Rey
1979–80	7	2ª Reg.	2nd	
1980–81	7	2ª Reg.	6th	
1981–82	7	2ª Reg.	2nd	
1982–83	7	2ª Reg.	1st	
1983–84	6	1ª Reg.	1st	
1984–85	5	Reg. Pref.	17th	
1985–86	6	1ª Reg.	5th	
1986–87	6	1ª Reg.	18th	
1987–88	7	2ª Reg.	7th	
1988–89	7	2ª Reg.	1st	
1989–90	6	1ª Reg.	5th	
1990–91	6	1ª Reg.	2nd	
1991–92	6	Pref. Terr.	5th	
1992–93	6	Pref. Terr.	6th	
1993–94	6	Pref. Terr.	7th	
1994–95	6	Pref. Terr.	3rd	
1995–96	6	Pref. Terr.	3rd	
1996–97	6	Pref. Terr.	2nd	
1997–98	6	Pref. Terr.	3rd	
1998–99	6	Pref. Terr.	1st	

Season	Tier	Division	Place	Copa del Rey
1999–2000	5	1ª Cat.	17th	
2000–01	5	1ª Cat.	17th	
2001–02	5	1ª Cat.	5th	
2002–03	4	3ª	6th	
2003–04	4	3ª	7th	
2004–05	4	3ª	11th	
2005–06	4	3ª	10th	
2006–07	4	3ª	12th	
2007–08	4	3ª	17th	N/A (Note: Reserve team of UE Miapuesta Castelldefels)
2008–09	5	1ª Cat.	2nd	
2009–10	4	3ª	11th	
2010–11	4	3ª	13th	
2011–12	4	3ª	13th	
2012–13	4	3ª	13th	
2013–14	4	3ª	16th	
2014–15	4	3ª	18th	
2015–16	5	1ª Cat.	1st	
2016–17	4	3ª	15th	
2017–18	4	3ª	16th	
2018–19	4	3ª	16th	

Season	Tier	Division	Place	Copa del Rey
2019–20	4	3ª	11th	
2020–21	4	3ª	6th / 4th	
2021–22	5	3ª RFEF	12th	
2022–23	5	3ª Fed.	6th	
2023–24	5	3ª Fed.	17th	
2024–25	6	Lliga Elit	6th	
2025–26	6	Lliga Elit		

- 17 seasons in Tercera División
- 3 seasons in Tercera Federación/Tercera División RFEF
