= FC Vilafranca =

Spanish association football club

Vilafranca
- Full name: Futbol Club Vilafranca
- Founded: 1904
- Ground: Municipal, Vilafranca del Penedès, Catalonia, Spain
- Capacity: 5,000
- Chairman: Joan Soler
- Manager: Iván Moreno
- League: Primera Catalana – Group 3
- 2025–26: Lliga Elit, 15th of 16 (relegated)
Home colours	Away colours

Futbol Club Vilafranca is a Catalan Spanish football team based in Vilafranca del Penedès, Catalonia. Founded in 1904, it currently plays in Primera Catalana – Group 3, holding home matches at Camp Municipal with a capacity for 5,000 seats.

== History ==
The club was founded in 1904, being one of the oldest football clubs in Spain. In August 2020, the club became the farm team of Lleida Esportiu.

In May 2021, Vilafranca achieved a first-ever promotion to Segunda División RFEF (which replaced the old Segunda División B), but as Lleida failed to achieve promotion to Primera División RFEF, Vilafranca became ineligible for promotion.

== Season to season ==
Season	Tier	Division	Place	Copa del Rey
1939–40	7	2ª Reg.	6th	
1940–41	6	2ª Reg. P.	1st	
1941–42	6	2ª Reg. P.	3rd	
1942–43	4	1ª Reg. B	3rd	
1943–44	5	2ª Reg.	1st	
1944–45	5	1ª Reg. B	2nd	
1945–46	4	1ª Reg. A	9th	
1946–47	4	1ª Reg. A	3rd	
1947–48	4	1ª Reg. A	3rd	
1948–49	4	1ª Reg. A	8th	
1949–50	4	1ª Reg. A	5th	
1950–51	4	1ª Reg. A	2nd	
1951–52	4	1ª Reg. A	6th	
1952–53	4	1ª Reg. A	15th	
1953–54	4	1ª Reg.	18th	
1954–55	4	1ª Reg.	7th	
1955–56	4	1ª Reg.	5th	
1956–57	3	3ª	4th	
1957–58	3	3ª	16th	
1958–59	4	1ª Reg.	5th	

Season	Tier	Division	Place	Copa del Rey
1959–60	4	1ª Reg.	18th	
1960–61	4	1ª Reg.	10th	
1961–62	4	1ª Reg.	1st	
1962–63	3	3ª	9th	
1963–64	3	3ª	12th	
1964–65	3	3ª	19th	
1965–66	4	1ª Reg.	4th	
1966–67	4	1ª Reg.	5th	
1967–68	4	1ª Reg.	2nd	
1968–69	3	3ª	16th	
1969–70	3	3ª	19th	
1970–71	4	Reg. Pref.	8th	
1971–72	4	Reg. Pref.	11th	
1972–73	4	Reg. Pref.	17th	
1973–74	5	1ª Reg.	3rd	
1974–75	5	1ª Reg.	15th	
1975–76	5	1ª Reg.	4th	
1976–77	5	1ª Reg.	5th	
1977–78	5	Reg. Pref.	2nd	
1978–79	5	Reg. Pref.	1st	

Season	Tier	Division	Place	Copa del Rey
1979–80	4	3ª	13th	Second round
1980–81	4	3ª	4th	
1981–82	4	3ª	7th	First round
1982–83	4	3ª	14th	
1983–84	4	3ª	14th	
1984–85	4	3ª	12th	
1985–86	4	3ª	18th	
1986–87	5	Reg. Pref.	7th	
1987–88	5	Reg. Pref.	2nd	
1988–89	4	3ª	17th	
1989–90	4	3ª	19th	
1990–91	5	Reg. Pref.	7th	
1991–92	5	1ª Cat.	13th	
1992–93	5	1ª Cat.	10th	
1993–94	5	1ª Cat.	8th	
1994–95	5	1ª Cat.	8th	
1995–96	5	1ª Cat.	2nd	
1996–97	4	3ª	11th	
1997–98	4	3ª	16th	
1998–99	4	3ª	20th	

Season	Tier	Division	Place	Copa del Rey
1999–2000	5	1ª Cat.	9th	
2000–01	5	1ª Cat.	4th	
2001–02	5	1ª Cat.	10th	
2002–03	5	1ª Cat.	16th	
2003–04	6	Pref. Terr.	3rd	
2004–05	6	Pref. Terr.	2nd	
2005–06	5	1ª Cat.	11th	
2006–07	5	1ª Cat.	8th	
2007–08	5	1ª Cat.	5th	
2008–09	5	1ª Cat.	17th	
2009–10	5	1ª Cat.	1st	
2010–11	4	3ª	11th	
2011–12	4	3ª	8th	
2012–13	4	3ª	16th	
2013–14	4	3ª	13th	
2014–15	4	3ª	5th	
2015–16	4	3ª	4th	
2016–17	4	3ª	4th	
2017–18	4	3ª	9th	
2018–19	4	3ª	9th	

Season	Tier	Division	Place	Copa del Rey
2019–20	4	3ª	7th	
2020–21	4	3ª	2nd	N/A (Note: Reserve team of Lleida Esportiu)
2021–22	5	3ª RFEF	11th	N/A
2022–23	5	3ª Fed.	14th	
2023–24	5	3ª Fed.	16th	
2024–25	6	Lliga Elit	7th	
2025–26	6	Lliga Elit		

- 30 seasons in Tercera División
- 3 seasons in Tercera Federación/Tercera División RFEF
