= Cerdanyola del Vallès FC =

Spanish association football club

- Full name: Cerdanyola del Vallès Futbol Club
- Nicknames: Sarda, Els verds/Les verdes
- Founded: 2006
- Ground: La Bòbila-Pinetons, Cerdanyola del Vallès, Catalonia, Spain
- Capacity: 1,000
- Chairman: Felipe López Rins
- Manager: Antonio Carrillo
- League: Tercera Federación – Group 5
- 2025–26: Tercera Federación – Group 5, 15th of 18
- Website: https://cfc.cat
| Home colours | Away colours |

Cerdanyola del Vallès Futbol Club is a Spanish football team based in Cerdanyola del Vallès, Barcelona, in the autonomous community of Catalonia. Founded in 2006, it plays in Tercera Federación – Group 5, holding home games at Estadi Municipal La Bòbila-Pinetons.

== History ==
The club was founded in June 2006 as a result of the merger of Centro de Deportes Cerdanyola, UE Fontetes, EFUD Cerdanyola, CF Baroja and EF Cerdanyolense-Montflorit. Five clubs made it possible to create a more powerful entity at the Catalan sports scene.

== Season to season ==
| Season | Tier | Division | Place | Copa del Rey |
|---|---|---|---|---|
| 2006–07 | 7 | 1ª Terr. | 6th | |
| 2007–08 | 7 | 1ª Terr. | 6th | |
| 2008–09 | 7 | 1ª Terr. | 1st | |
| 2009–10 | 6 | Pref. Terr. | 10th | |
| 2010–11 | 6 | Pref. Terr. | 4th | |
| 2011–12 | 5 | 1ª Cat. | 5th | |
| 2012–13 | 5 | 1ª Cat. | 1st | |
| 2013–14 | 4 | 3ª | 12th | |
| 2014–15 | 4 | 3ª | 10th | |
| 2015–16 | 4 | 3ª | 8th | |
| 2016–17 | 4 | 3ª | 14th | |
| 2017–18 | 4 | 3ª | 12nd | |
| 2018–19 | 4 | 3ª | 11th | |
| 2019–20 | 4 | 3ª | 13th | |
| 2020–21 | 4 | 3ª | 1st / 5th | |
| 2021–22 | 4 | 2ª RFEF | 13th | |
| 2022–23 | 4 | 2ª Fed. | 10th | |
| 2023–24 | 4 | 2ª Fed. | 15th | |
| 2024–25 | 5 | 3ª Fed. | 12th | |
| 2025–26 | 5 | 3ª Fed. | 15th | |

| Season | Tier | Division | Place | Copa del Rey |
|---|---|---|---|---|
| 2026–27 | 5 | 3ª Fed. | | |

- 3 seasons in Segunda Federación/Segunda División RFEF
- 8 seasons in Tercera División
- 3 seasons in Tercera Federación

== Current squad ==
As of 23 September 2025

Note: Flags indicate national team as defined under FIFA eligibility rules; some limited exceptions apply. Players may hold more than one non-FIFA nationality.

| No. | Pos. | Nation | Player |
|---|---|---|---|
| 1 | GK | ESP | Álex Bañó |
| 2 | FW | ESP | Iván Bustamante |
| 3 | MF | ESP | Joan Bauza |
| 4 | MF | ESP | Guifré Bernabeu |
| 5 | DF | ESP | Alejandro Salcedo |
| 6 | MF | ESP | Miquel Puerto |
| 7 | MF | ESP | Didac Serra |
| 8 | DF | ESP | Eric Ruiz |
| 9 | FW | ESP | Javier López |
| 10 | MF | ESP | Albert Ruiz |
| 11 | MF | ESP | Marco Gil |
| 13 | GK | ESP | Pablo Romero |

| No. | Pos. | Nation | Player |
|---|---|---|---|
| 14 | MF | ESP | Adam Cherradi |
| 15 | DF | ESP | Soufian Grana |
| 16 | MF | ESP | Bambo Danfakha |
| 17 | FW | SEN | Bakary Cissé |
| 18 | DF | ESP | Víctor Pitarque |
| 19 | FW | ESP | Alex Montalban |
| 20 | MF | ESP | Hugo Ruiz |
| 21 | MF | ESP | Esteve Monterde |
| 22 | FW | ESP | Jan Gumà |
| 23 | FW | MAR | Abdellah Afazaz |
| 24 | FW | ESP | David Castelló (on loan from Sant Andreu) |
