= AE Prat =

Spanish association football club

- Full name: Associació Esportiva Prat
- Founded: 1945; 81 years ago
- Ground: Sagnier, El Prat, Catalonia, Spain
- Capacity: 500
- President: Luis Quiñonero
- Head coach: David Vilajoana
- League: Lliga Elit
- 2025–26: Lliga Elit, 4th of 16
Home colours	Away colours

Associació Esportiva Prat is a Spanish football team based in El Prat de Llobregat, in the autonomous community of Catalonia. Founded in 1945 it plays in Lliga Elit, holding home games at Estadi Sagnier, with a 500-seat capacity.

== History ==
The club was founded on 7 February 1945 as Agrupación Deportiva Prat. Josep Aleu Torres became its first president.

== Season to season ==
Season	Tier	Division	Place	Copa del Rey
1945–46	6	2ª Reg. P.	2nd	
1946–47	6	3ª Reg.	5th	
1947–48	7	Reg. Afic.	2nd	
1948–49	6	2ª Reg.	5th	
1949–50	6	2ª Reg.	8th	
1950–51	6	2ª Reg.	4th	
1951–52	5	1ª Reg. B	12th	
1952–53	5	1ª Reg. B	7th	
1953–54	5	2ª Reg.	5th	
1954–55	5	2ª Reg.	14th	
1955–56	5	2ª Reg.	8th	
1956–57	5	2ª Reg.	14th	
1957–58	5	2ª Reg.	3rd	
1958–59	4	1ª Reg.	22nd	
1959–60	5	2ª Reg.	2nd	
1960–61	4	1ª Reg.	15th	
1961–62	4	1ª Reg.	17th	
1962–63	5	2ª Reg.	1st	
1963–64	5	2ª Reg.	1st	
1964–65	4	1ª Reg.	14th	

Season	Tier	Division	Place	Copa del Rey
1965–66	4	1ª Reg.	6th	
1966–67	4	1ª Reg.	3rd	
1967–68	4	1ª Reg.	11th	
1968–69	5	1ª Reg.	1st	
1969–70	4	Reg. Pref.	10th	
1970–71	5	1ª Reg.	17th	
1971–72	5	1ª Reg.	5th	
1972–73	5	1ª Reg.	3rd	
1973–74	5	1ª Reg.	8th	
1974–75	5	1ª Reg.	2nd	
1975–76	4	Reg. Pref.	16th	
1976–77	5	1ª Reg.	9th	
1977–78	6	1ª Reg.	3rd	
1978–79	6	1ª Reg.	15th	
1979–80	7	2ª Reg.	14th	
1980–81	7	2ª Reg.	4th	
1981–82	7	2ª Reg.	1st	
1982–83	6	1ª Reg.	1st	
1983–84	5	Reg. Pref.	2nd	
1984–85	4	3ª	16th	

Season	Tier	Division	Place	Copa del Rey
1985–86	4	3ª	9th	
1986–87	4	3ª	18th	
1987–88	5	Reg. Pref.	7th	
1988–89	5	Reg. Pref.	6th	
1989–90	5	Reg. Pref.	10th	
1990–91	5	Reg. Pref.	15th	
1991–92	6	Pref. Terr.	8th	
1992–93	6	Pref. Terr.	9th	
1993–94	6	Pref. Terr.	13th	
1994–95	6	Pref. Terr.	2nd	
1995–96	5	1ª Cat.	14th	
1996–97	5	1ª Cat.	16th	
1997–98	6	Pref. Terr.	14th	
1998–99	5	1ª Cat.	6th	
1999–2000	5	1ª Cat.	13th	
2000–01	5	1ª Cat.	17th	
2001–02	5	1ª Cat.	6th	
2002–03	4	3ª	16th	
2003–04	5	1ª Cat.	4th	
2004–05	5	1ª Cat.	1st	

Season	Tier	Division	Place	Copa del Rey
2005–06	4	3ª	12th	
2006–07	4	3ª	18th	
2007–08	5	1ª Cat.	2nd	
2008–09	4	3ª	8th	
2009–10	4	3ª	4th	
2010–11	4	3ª	9th	
2011–12	4	3ª	1st	
2012–13	3	2ª B	12th	Third round
2013–14	3	2ª B	17th	
2014–15	4	3ª	6th	
2015–16	4	3ª	1st	
2016–17	3	2ª B	19th	First round
2017–18	4	3ª	5th	
2018–19	4	3ª	4th	
2019–20	3	2ª B	17th	
2020–21	3	2ª B	10th / 3rd	
2021–22	4	2ª RFEF	12th	
2022–23	4	2ª Fed.	14th	
2023–24	5	3ª Fed.	5th	
2024–25	5	3ª Fed.	18th	

Season	Tier	Division	Place	Copa del Rey
2025–26	6	Lliga Elit	4th	
2026–27	6	Lliga Elit		TBD

- 5 seasons in Segunda División B
- 2 seasons in Segunda Federación/Segunda División RFEF
- 14 seasons in Tercera División
- 2 seasons in Tercera Federación

== Honours ==
- Tercera División
  - Champions (2): 2011–12, 2015–16

== Players ==
=== Current squad ===
As of 25 September 2025

Note: Flags indicate national team as defined under FIFA eligibility rules; some limited exceptions apply. Players may hold more than one non-FIFA nationality.

No.	Pos.	Nation	Player
1	GK	ESP	Guillem Coves
2	DF	ESP	David Adán
3	DF	ESP	Roger Peña
4	DF	ESP	Carlos García
5	DF	ESP	Pol Aldabó
6	MF	BRA	Gustavo Reinke
7	MF	ESP	Xavi Pluvins
8	MF	ESP	Marc Font
9	FW	ESP	Ricki Vidal
10	MF	ESP	Adri Toro
11	FW	ESP	Álex Plaza
13	GK	ESP	Dani Guiseris
14	FW	ESP	Adri Rivas

No.	Pos.	Nation	Player
15	DF	ESP	David Hidalgo
16	MF	ESP	Álex Sánchez
17	FW	ESP	Nico Cuevas
18	MF	ESP	Marc Muñoz
19	FW	ESP	Martin Valeriev
20	DF	ESP	Rúben Gómez
21	FW	ESP	Martín Lamelas
22	FW	ESP	Marc Padilla
23	MF	ESP	Abel Cortina
24	DF	ESP	Jordi Buyreu
28	MF	ESP	Xavi Víctor
30	MF	ESP	Dani Bonaventura
