= 2013–14 FC Barcelona season =

115th season in existence of FC Barcelona

Barcelona
2013–14 season
- President: Sandro Rosell (until 24 January); Josep Maria Bartomeu (from 24 January)
- Head coach: Gerardo Martino
- Stadium: Camp Nou
- La Liga: 2nd
- Copa del Rey: Runners-up
- Supercopa de España: Winners
- UEFA Champions League: Quarter-finals
- Top goalscorer: League: Lionel Messi (28); All: Lionel Messi (41)
- Highest home attendance: 98,761 vs Real Madrid (26 October 2013)
- Lowest home attendance: 25,551 vs Levante (29 January 2014)
- Average home league attendance: 72,441 (including Joan Gamper Trophy)
Home colours	Away colours	Third colours

The 2013–14 season was Futbol Club Barcelona's 115th in existence and the club's 83rd consecutive season in the top flight of Spanish football. This was the first and only season under head coach Gerardo Martino.

This season was the first since 2006–07 without teammate Eric Abidal, who departed to Monaco after his contract expired.

== Kit ==
Home	Away	Away UCL	Away alt.	Away alt. 2	Third

== Season overview ==
=== June ===
On 3 June, Brazilian Neymar was officially presented as a Barcelona player to more than 50,000 fans at Camp Nou. He joined the squad after the 2013 FIFA Confederations Cup in Brazil. On 20 June, after spending the previous season on loan to Mallorca, it was officially announced that Andreu Fontàs will be joining Celta de Vigo for a sum of €1 million. Barça will retain a buy-back clause in addition to the player's rights in any future transfer. While at Celta, Fontàs will be reunited with former Barcelona B coach Luis Enrique, whom he managed between 2008 and 2010. On 28 June, it was announced that Santos will participate in the 2013 edition of the Joan Gamper Trophy on 2 August at the Camp Nou. Santos' participation was agreed upon Barça signing Neymar.

=== July ===
On 6 July, Bojan was officially loaned to Ajax with an option for a second year loan spell. Bojan explained that conversations with Johan Cruyff had influenced his decision to move to Ajax, as well as the opportunity to play in the UEFA Champions League. On 8 July, Barcelona announced the transfer of Spanish international forward David Villa to Atlético Madrid for a reported fee of €5.1 million and reserve the right to 50% of any future sale of the player. Villa, who joined Barça in the summer of 2010, played 119 times and scored 48 goals and leaves the club after three seasons and eight trophies won. On 15 July, Barcelona announced that midfielder Thiago will be joining German champions Bayern Munich, where he joins his former Barcelona coach Pep Guardiola, for €25 million. The transfer also stipulates that the two clubs will play a friendly sometime within the next four seasons. The 22-year-old leaves after two season with the first team. On 16 July, it was announced that midfielder Sergio Busquets agreed to a contract extension with the club for a further five years until 2018, with an option of an additional year. Busquets' buyout clause remains set at €150 million. On 19 July, Barcelona President Sandro Rosell officially announced the resignation of current manager Tito Vilanova. Vilanova will not be able to perform his managerial duties as he undergoes further treatment for his illness. During the press conference, Rosell announced, "After evaluating the results from the routine check-ups, which Tito Vilanova underwent this week, he was presented with the option to continue treatment to control his illness which will make it impossible to continue his responsibilities as the first team manager of the senior side." As a result, Barça rescheduled their pre-season match against Lechia Gdańsk in Poland to 30 July. On 23 July, former Newell's Old Boys manager Gerardo Martino was officially announced as the new coach of Barcelona and is subsequently signed a two-year contract with the club. The appointment makes Martino, nicknamed "Tata", the fourth Argentine to coach Barça after Helenio Herrera, Roque Olsen and César Luis Menotti.

=== August ===
On 1 August, Cristian Tello extended his contract with Barcelona until 30 June 2018, with a set buyout clause of €25 million. On 18 August, Barcelona won their first match of the La Liga season thrashing Levante 7–0, with goals coming from Alexis Sánchez, Dani Alves and Xavi and braces by Lionel Messi and Pedro. On 25 August, Barça defeated Málaga with a single goal from Adriano before the half-time break. On 28 August, Barça won the 2013 Supercopa de España at the Camp Nou. The 0–0 scoreline at Camp Nou, meant that the 1–1 draw from the first leg at the Vicente Calderón was enough to win the trophy on the away goals rule, with the winning goal coming from Neymar's 66th-minute header.

=== September ===
On 1 September, Barcelona made it three wins in a row to ensure top spot on the league table, after a hard-fought victory against Valencia. Messi's first half hat-trick, together with a match saving performance by Víctor Valdés, was enough to see Barça win at the Mestalla for the first time since 2011. On 14 September, Barcelona defeated Sevilla 3–2 at Camp Nou with a 94th-minute winner from Alexis Sánchez. On 18 September, Barcelona defeated Ajax 4–0 at home in their first group match of the 2013–14 UEFA Champions League with a hat-trick from Messi and one goal from Gerard Piqué. With the three goals, Messi took his career tally to 62 goals in the Champions League leaving him nine goals short of former Real Madrid forward and record marksman Raúl. He also became the first player to score four hat-tricks in the Champions League, whilst also netting his 24th such treble for Barça. On 21 September, Barcelona defeated Rayo Vallecano 0–4 at Campo de Vallecas. A hat-trick from Pedro, one from Cesc Fàbregas and another great performance from Valdés, who saved his second penalty in two consecutive matches, gave Barça the three points. This match also marked the first time since 7 May 2008 against Real Madrid where Barcelona did not finish the match with a higher percentage of possession than the opponent. Breaking a streak of 315 matches in a row. On 24 September, Barcelona continued its hot start to the league campaign with a 4–1 victory over Real Sociedad at home. On 28 September, Barcelona defeated newly promoted side Almería on the road with a 0–2 scoreline. With the victory, Barça set a team record with seven wins from the first seven matches in the league. Messi scored his league leading eight goal of the season but was substituted seven minutes later with muscle problems in his right leg. It was confirmed Messi will be out for two to three weeks with a tear to his biceps femoris in his right leg.

=== October ===
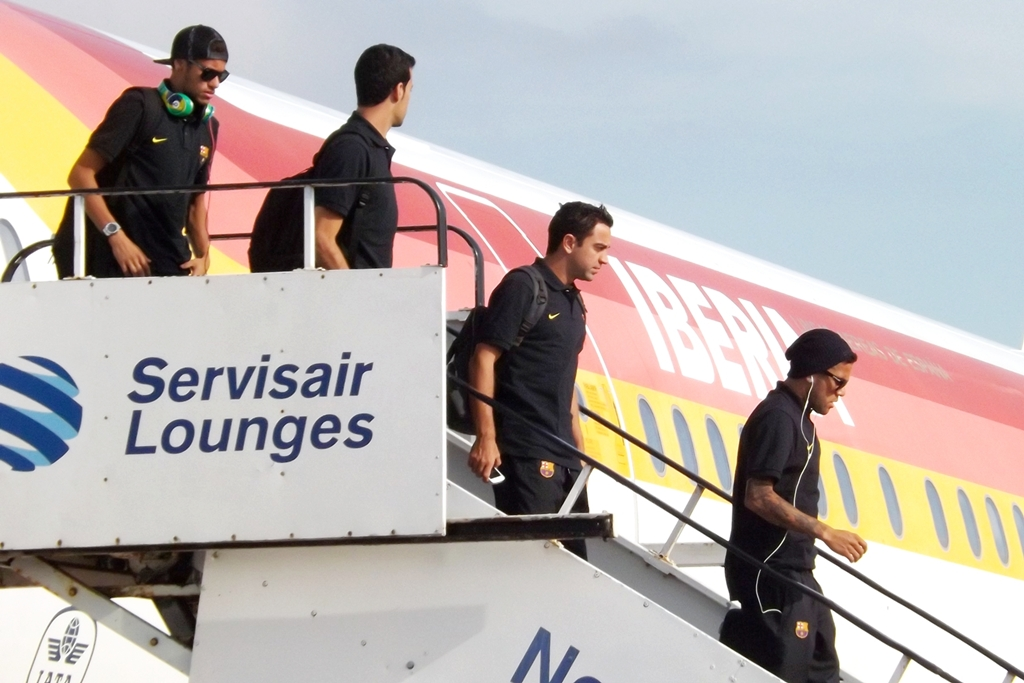
Barça players arriving at Glasgow Airport before their clash with Celtic

On 1 October, Barcelona defeated Scottish club Celtic at Celtic Park with a 0–1 scoreline to stay at top of Group H in the Champions League. Fàbregas' goal gave Barça the win, a year after last season's defeat in the same fixture. On 5 October, Barcelona made it eight out of eight in their record breaking start to the league season with a 4–1 win over Real Valladolid at Camp Nou. Goals by Xavi, Neymar and a brace by Sánchez turned the result around after Valladolid's Javi Guerra opener in the tenth minute. On 19 October, Barcelona drop their first points of the season after a goalless draw with Osasuna at El Sadar that draw mean Barça failed to match La Liga's best ever start to a season and put an end to an eight-game winning run. On 22 October, Barcelona failed to clinch a spot in knockout rounds of the Champions League against Milan after a 1–1 draw in Italy. Messi goal equaled the result after Robinho opener in the ninth minute. With the draw, Barça stayed top of Group H with seven points, two more than Milan. On 26 October, the first Clásico of the season was contested at the Camp Nou with Barça securing a 2–1 victory over their great rivals. Strikes from Neymar and a spectacular Sánchez second gave Barça the win that leaves them six points clear of Real Madrid. On 29 October, Barcelona defeated Celta de Vigo 3–0 at Balaídos with goals from Sánchez and Fàbregas to keep Barça undefeated in the league.

=== November ===
On 1 November, Barcelona defeated Espanyol 1–0 at Camp Nou and won the first derby of the season the only goal came from Alexis Sánchez. On 6 November, Barcelona defeated Milan 3–1 at Camp Nou and qualified for the Knockout Rounds of the Champions League with two match days left. Messi returned to scoring with a brace after going four games without a goal. Busquets added another to send Barça through to the last 16. On 10 November, Barcelona defeated Real Betis 1–4 at the Benito Villamarín with scores from Neymar, Pedro and two from Fàbregas to put Barça three points ahead of Atlético Madrid in La Liga. Messi picked up an injury and will be sidelined for 6 to 8 weeks with a tear in his left hamstring. On 23 November, Barcelona defeated Granada 4–0 at Camp Nou. Barça overcome their injury woes to beat Granada with two penalty goals from Iniesta, and Fàbregas, while Sánchez and Pedro scored the others. On 26 November, Barcelona suffered their first defeat of the season, a 2–1 loss to Ajax at the Amsterdam Arena. With the loss, Barça fell one victory short of equaling their best start to a season.

=== December ===
On 1 December, Barcelona lost to Athletic Bilbao at the San Mamés by a score of 1–0. This was Barcelona's second loss in a week and their first in the league. On 6 December, Barcelona started their Copa del Rey campaign with a victory in Cartagonova with a 1–4 win over Cartagena. Goals from Fàbregas, and Dongou, and a brace by Pedro, gave Barça the first leg victory. On 11 December, Barcelona defeated Celtic 6–1 at Camp Nou and secured the top spot in the group thanks to goals from Piqué, Pedro, Neymar (3) and Tello. On 14 December, Barcelona defeated Villarreal 2–1 at Camp Nou two goals from Neymar gave Barça the victory. On 17 December, Barcelona qualify for the Round of 16 of the Copa del Rey after defeating 3-0 Cartagena at the Camp Nou Pedro, Mariano (o.g.) and Neymar scored for Barça. On 22 December, Barcelona defeated Getafe 2–5 at the Coliseum Alfonso Pérez a hat-trick from Pedro and a brace from Fàbregas gave Barça the victory over Getafe, who led 2–0 after 14 minutes. With the win, Barça stays top of the league into the holiday break and ends 2013, leading La Liga wire-to-wire.

=== January ===
On 5 January, Barcelona won their first match of the year against newly promoted side Elche, with a 4–0 score. A hat-trick from Sánchez, including a goal from a free kick, and another from Pedro, gave Barça the win at home. On 8 January, Barcelona defeated Getafe 4–0 in the first leg of the Round of 16 of the Copa del Rey. Braces from Fàbregas and Messi gave Barça half a ticket to the quarter-finals. On 11 January, Barcelona were held to a scoreless draw by Atlético Madrid at the Vicente Calderón a gripping game between the two league leaders ended without score. On 16 January, Barcelona qualify for the Quarter-finals of the Copa del Rey after defeating 2-0 Getafe at the Coliseum Alfonso Pérez a brace from messi gave Barça the win and Xavi features in his 700th match for the team. On 19 January, Barcelona drew their second league match in a row. A 1–1 draw against Levante at the Ciutat de València saw Gerard Piqué scoring the only goal. On 22 January, Barcelona defeated Levante 4–1 in the first leg of the Quarter-finals of the Copa del Rey three days after the draw in the league an own goal from Juanfran and a hat-trick from Cristian Tello gave Barça the win at the Ciutat de València. On 26 January, Barcelona defeated Málaga 3–0 at Camp Nou goals from Piqué, Pedro and Sánchez gave Barça the victory. On 29 January, Barcelona qualified for the Semi-finals of the Copa del Rey after defeating Levante 5–1 at the Camp Nou; Adriano, Puyol, Sánchez (2) and Fàbregas scored for Barça.

=== February ===
On 1 February, Barcelona lost their first match at home after being defeated at Camp Nou by Valencia with a scoreline of 2–3, where Sánchez and Messi scored for Barça, while Jordi Alba was sent off with a second yellow. On 5 February, Barcelona defeated Real Sociedad 2–0 at Camp Nou in the first leg of the semi-finals of the Copa del Rey. goals from Busquets and Zubikarai (o.g.) gave Barça half a ticket to the final. On 9 February, Barcelona defeated Sevilla 4–1 at Ramón Sánchez Pizjuán, goals coming from Sánchez, Fàbregas and a brace by Messi to give Barça the top spot in the league. On 12 February, Barcelona reached their 35th Copa del Rey final after a 1–1 draw against Real Sociedad at Anoeta. On 15 February, Barcelona trashed Rayo Vallecano 6–0 at Camp Nou with goals coming from Adriano, Sánchez, Pedro, Neymar and a brace by Lionel Messi. On 18 February, Barcelona defeated Manchester City at the Etihad Stadium with a 0–2 win in their Champions League first leg encounter to move closer to qualifying for the quarter-finals. Messi and Dani Alves scored for Barça. On 22 February, Barcelona lost to Real Sociedad at the Anoeta by a score of 3–1.

=== March ===
On 9 March, Barcelona defeated Almería 4–1 at Camp Nou; goals from Sánchez, Messi, Xavi and Puyol gave Barça the win. On 8 March, Barcelona lost to Real Valladolid at the José Zorrilla by a score of 1–0. This was Barcelona's second away loss in a row. On 12 March, Barcelona qualified for the quarter-finals of the Champions League after defeating Manchester City 2–1 at Camp Nou. Messi and Dani Alves scored for Barça. On 16 March, Barcelona trashed Osasuna 7–0 at Camp Nou with goals coming from Sánchez, Iniesta, Tello, Pedro and a hat-trick by Lionel Messi. On 23 March, the second Clásico of the season was contested at the Santiago Bernabéu with Barça securing a 3–4 victory over their great rivals. A hat-trick from Messi and a lone goal by Iniesta gave Barça the win that leaves them one point off of league leaders Real Madrid. On 26 March, Barcelona defeated Celta Vigo 3–0 at Camp Nou. A brace from Neymar and a lone goal by Messi gave Barça the win. Valdés picked up an injury and will be sidelined for the rest of the season. On 29 March, Barcelona defeated Espanyol 0–1 at Cornellà de Llobregat and won the second derby of the season, with the only goal coming from Messi.

=== April ===
On 1 April, Barcelona drew in the first leg of the quarter-finals of the Champions League. The match against Atlético Madrid at the Camp Nou ended with a 1–1 draw. Neymar scored the goal for Barcelona. On 2 April, Barcelona was sanctioned by FIFA for international transfers of minors over various periods between 2009 and 2013. The sanction consisted in a transfer ban at both national and international level for two complete and consecutive transfer periods, together with a fine of CHF 450,000. FIFA's regulations dictate that international transfers regarding minors are only accepted in three scenarios—the player's parents have moved to another country for non-related reasons; the move takes place within the European Union if the player is aged between 16 and 18, or the player's home is less than 50 kilometres from the national border being crossed. However, it was temporarily lifted until the appeal process, giving the club the chance to purchase players in the summer transfer window of 2014,

=== May ===
On 17 May, in a game where they needed to defeat Atlético Madrid (who eliminated them from the UEFA Champions League in the quarterfinals earlier in the year) to be crowned champions of La Liga for the 23rd time, they drew after Atlético defender Diego Godín headed in the equalizer in the 49th minute, giving Atlético the championship.

== Players ==
=== Squad information ===
N	Pos.	Nat.	Name	Age	EU	Since	App	Goals	Ends	Transfer fee	Notes
1	GK	(Spain)	Víctor Valdés (3rd captain)	32	EU	2002	535	0	2014	Youth system	
2	RB	(Spain)	Martín Montoya	23	EU	2011	55	2	2018	Youth system	
3	CB	(Spain)	Gerard Piqué	27	EU	2008	266	20	2015	€5M	From Youth system
4	CM	(Spain)	Cesc Fàbregas	27	EU	2011	151	42	2016	€34M	From Youth system
5	CB	(Spain)	Carles Puyol (captain)	36	EU	1999	593	18	2016	Youth system	
6	CM	(Spain)	Xavi (vice-captain)	34	EU	1998	723	83	2016	Youth system	
7	FW	(Spain)	Pedro	26	EU	2008	268	87	2016	Youth system	
8	CM	(Spain)	Andrés Iniesta (4th captain)	30	EU	2002	507	50	2018	Youth system	
9	FW	(Chile)	Alexis Sánchez	25	Non-EU	2011	141	47	2016	€26M	
10	FW	(Argentina)	Lionel Messi	26	EU	2004	425	354	2018	Youth system	Second nationality: Spain
11	FW	(Brazil)	Neymar	22	Non-EU	2013	41	15	2018	€57.1M	
12	CM	(Mexico)	Jonathan dos Santos	24	EU	2009	28	0	2015	Youth system	
13	GK	(Spain)	José Manuel Pinto	38	EU	2008	90	0	2014	€0.5M	
14	MF	(Argentina)	Javier Mascherano	29	EU	2010	184	0	2016	€22M	Second nationality: Italy
15	CB	(Spain)	Marc Bartra	23	EU	2010	54	3	2017	Youth system	
16	DM	(Spain)	Sergio Busquets	25	EU	2008	284	11	2018	Youth system	
17	DM	(Cameroon)	Alex Song	26	EU	2012	65	1	2017	€19M	Second nationality: France
18	LB	(Spain)	Jordi Alba	24	EU	2012	70	5	2017	€14M	From Youth system
19	FW	(Netherlands)	Ibrahim Afellay	28	EU	2011	35	2	2015	€3M	
20	FW	(Spain)	Cristian Tello	22	EU	2011	86	20	2018	Youth system	
21	LB	(Brazil)	Adriano	29	EU	2010	143	14	2017	€9.5M	Second nationality: Spain
22	RB	(Brazil)	Dani Alves	31	EU	2008	297	20	2015	€32M	Second nationality: Spain
23	FW	(Spain)	Isaac Cuenca	23	EU	2012	30	4	2015	Youth system	
24	CM	(Spain)	Sergi Roberto	22	EU	2012	39	2	2015	Youth system	
25	GK	(Spain)	Oier	24	EU	2012	2	0	2015	Youth system	

- Last updated: 17 May 2014
- Source: FCBarcelona.com, Players in / out, Wikipedia players' articles, ESPN (for appearances and goals) and footballdatabase.com (for EU passport)

=== From the youth system ===
N	Pos.	Nat.	Name	Age	Notes
26	DF	(Spain)	Sergi Gómez	21	
27	DF	(Spain)	Patric	20	
28	FW	(Spain)	Adama Traoré	17	
29	FW	(Cameroon)	Jean Marie Dongou	18	
30	DF	(Spain)	Carles Planas	22	

=== Transfers in ===
No.	Pos.	Nat.	Name	Age	EU	Moving from	Type	Transfer window	Ends	Transfer fee	Source
11	FW	(Brazil)	Neymar	21	Non-EU	Santos (Brazil)	Transfer	Summer	2018	€57.1M	FCBarcelona.com
19	FW	(Netherlands)	Ibrahim Afellay	27	EU	Schalke 04 (Germany)	Loan return	Summer	2015	N/A	
23	FW	(Spain)	Isaac Cuenca	22	EU	Ajax (Netherlands)	Loan return	Summer	2015	N/A	
24	MF	(Spain)	Sergi Roberto	21	EU	Barcelona B	Promoted	Summer	2015	Free	
25	GK	(Spain)	Oier Olazábal	23	EU	Barcelona B	Promoted	Summer	2015	Free	
–	CM	(Brazil)	Rafinha	20	EU	Barcelona B	Promoted	Summer	2016	Free	
–	FW	(Spain)	Gerard Deulofeu	19	EU	Barcelona B	Promoted	Summer	2017	Free	
–	FW	(Spain)	Bojan	22	EU	Roma (Italy)	Transfer	Summer	2015	€13M	

Total spending: ▼€70.1 Million

=== Transfers out ===
No.	Pos.	Nat.	Name	Age	EU	Moving to	Type	Transfer window	Transfer fee	Source
22	LB	(France)	Eric Abidal	33	EU	Monaco	End of contract	Summer	Free	FCBarcelona.com
24	CB	(Spain)	Andreu Fontàs	23	EU	Celta Vigo	Transfer	Summer	€1M	FCBarcelona.com
26	CB	(Spain)	Marc Muniesa	21	EU	Stoke City (England)	End of contract	Summer	Free	FCBarcelona.com
–	FW	(Brazil)	Keirrison	24	Non-EU	Coritiba (Brazil)	Loan Renewed	Summer	N/A	
–	FW	(Spain)	Bojan	22	EU	Ajax (Netherlands)	Loan	Summer	N/A	FCBarcelona.com
7	FW	(Spain)	David Villa	31	EU	Atlético Madrid	Transfer	Summer	€5M	FCBarcelona.com
–	FW	(Spain)	Gerard Deulofeu	19	EU	Everton (England)	Loan	Summer	N/A	FCBarcelona.com
11	CM	(Spain)	Thiago	22	EU	Bayern Munich (Germany)	Transfer	Summer	€25M	FCBarcelona.com
–	CM	(Brazil)	Rafinha	20	EU	Celta Vigo (Spain)	Loan	Summer	N/A	FCBarcelona.com

Total income: ▲€31 million

Expenditure: ▼€39.1 million

== Technical staff ==
Position	Staff
First team head coach	Gerardo "Tata" Martino
Assistant coach	Jorge Pautasso
Assistant	Jordi Roura; Adrián Coria; Raúl Marcovich; Joan Francesc Ferrer "Rubi"
Fitness coach	Elvio Paolorosso; Aureli Altimira; Eduardo Pons; Francesc Cos; Paco Seiruŀlo
Goalkeeping coach	José Ramón de la Fuente
Scoutings	Àlex García; Jordi Melero; Jaume Torras
Physiotherapist	Jaume Minull; Juanjo Brau; Roger Gironès
Doctor	Ramón Canal; Ricard Pruna; Daniel Medina
Team liaison	Carles Naval
Director of football	Andoni Zubizarreta
Academy director	Guillermo Amor
B team coach	Eusebio Sacristán

Last updated: 5 September 2013
Source: FC Barcelona

== Statistics ==
=== Squad, appearances and goals ===
No.	Nat	Player	Total		League		Europe		Cup		Supercopa	
No.	Nat	Player	Apps	Goals	Apps	Goals	Apps	Goals	Apps	Goals	Apps	Goals
Goalkeepers
1	(Spain)	Víctor Valdés	34	0	26	0	6	0	0	0	2	0
13	(Spain)	José Manuel Pinto	26	0	13	0	4	0	9	0	0	0
25	(Spain)	Oier Olazábal	0	0	0	0	0	0	0	0	0	0
Defenders
2	(Spain)	Martín Montoya	19	0	13	0	2	0	4	0	0	0
3	(Spain)	Gerard Piqué	39	4	26	2	9	2	2	0	2	0
5	(Spain)	Carles Puyol (c)	12	2	5	1	1	0	6	1	0	0
14	(Argentina)	Javier Mascherano	46	0	28	0	9	0	7	0	2	0
15	(Spain)	Marc Bartra	30	2	20	1	4	0	6	1	0	0
18	(Spain)	Jordi Alba	26	0	15	0	4	0	5	0	2	0
21	(Brazil)	Adriano	38	4	26	3	5	0	7	1	0	0
22	(Brazil)	Dani Alves	42	4	27	2	8	2	5	0	2	0
27	(Spain)	Patric	1	0	0	0	1	0	0	0	0	0
Midfielders
4	(Spain)	Cesc Fàbregas	55	13	36	8	9	1	8	4	2	0
6	(Spain)	Xavi (vc)	47	4	30	3	10	1	5	0	2	0
8	(Spain)	Andrés Iniesta	52	3	35	3	9	0	6	0	2	0
12	(Mexico)	Jonathan dos Santos	3	0	3	0	0	0	0	0	0	0
16	(Spain)	Sergio Busquets	48	3	32	1	9	1	5	1	2	0
17	(Cameroon)	Alex Song	31	0	19	0	4	0	7	0	1	0
19	(Netherlands)	Ibrahim Afellay	2	0	1	0	0	0	1	0	0	0
24	(Spain)	Sergi Roberto	27	0	17	0	4	0	6	0	0	0
Forwards
7	(Spain)	Pedro	54	19	37	15	7	1	8	3	2	0
9	(Chile)	Alexis Sánchez	54	21	34	19	9	0	9	2	2	0
10	(Argentina)	Lionel Messi	46	41	31	28	7	8	6	5	2	0
11	(Brazil)	Neymar	41	15	26	9	10	4	3	1	2	1
20	(Spain)	Cristian Tello	30	5	22	1	2	1	6	3	0	0
23	(Spain)	Isaac Cuenca	0	0	0	0	0	0	0	0	0	0
28	(Spain)	Adama Traoré	2	0	1	0	1	0	0	0	0	0
29	(Cameroon)	Jean Marie Dongou	3	1	1	0	1	0	1	1	0	0
Appearances = Total appearances
Last updated: 17 May 2014

=== Goal scorers ===
No.	Pos.	Nation	Name	La Liga	UEFA Champions League	Copa del Rey	Supercopa de España	Total
10	FW	(Argentina)	Messi	28	8	5	0	41
9	FW	(Chile)	Alexis	19	0	2	0	21
7	FW	(Spain)	Pedro	15	1	3	0	19
11	FW	(Brazil)	Neymar	9	4	1	1	15
4	MF	(Spain)	Fàbregas	8	1	4	0	13
20	FW	(Spain)	Tello	1	1	3	0	5
6	MF	(Spain)	Xavi	3	1	0	0	4
21	DF	(Brazil)	Adriano	3	0	1	0	4
22	DF	(Brazil)	Dani Alves	2	2	0	0	4
3	DF	(Spain)	Piqué	2	2	0	0	4
8	MF	(Spain)	Iniesta	3	0	0	0	3
16	MF	(Spain)	Busquets	1	1	1	0	3
15	DF	(Spain)	Bartra	1	0	1	0	2
5	DF	(Spain)	Puyol	1	0	1	0	2
29	FW	(Cameroon)	Dongou	0	0	1	0	1
–	–	–	Own goal	4	0	3	0	7
TOTAL				100	21	26	1	148

Last updated: 17 May 2014

=== Disciplinary record ===
Includes all competitive matches. Players listed below made at least one appearance for Barcelona first squad during the season.

N	P	Nat.	Name	League			Europe			Cup			Supercopa			Total			Notes
N	P	Nat.	Name	Yellow card	Second yellow card	Red card	Yellow card	Second yellow card	Red card	Yellow card	Second yellow card	Red card	Yellow card	Second yellow card	Red card	Yellow card	Second yellow card	Red card	Notes
1	GK	(Spain)	Valdés	2												2			Source
2	DF	(Spain)	Montoya							1						1			
3	DF	(Spain)	Piqué	4			1						1			6			
4	MF	(Spain)	Fàbregas	4			4			1			1			10			
5	DF	(Spain)	Puyol							1						1			
6	MF	(Spain)	Xavi																
7	FW	(Spain)	Pedro	2												2			
8	MF	(Spain)	Iniesta				2									2			
9	FW	(Chile)	Alexis	3			3									6			
10	FW	(Argentina)	Messi	1						1						2			
11	FW	(Brazil)	Neymar	6			1			1			1			9			
12	MF	(Mexico)	Dos Santos																Source
13	GK	(Spain)	Pinto	1												1			
14	MF	(Argentina)	Mascherano	6			2			2						10			
15	DF	(Spain)	Bartra	3						1						4			
16	MF	(Spain)	Busquets	10			2			2			2			16			
17	FW	(Spain)	Song	1						1						2			
18	DF	(Spain)	Alba	5	1		1						1			7	1		
19	FW	(Netherlands)	Afellay																
20	FW	(Spain)	Tello																
21	DF	(Brazil)	Adriano	7						1						8			
22	DF	(Brazil)	Dani Alves	6			2									8			
23	MF	(Spain)	Cuenca																
24	MF	(Spain)	S. Roberto				1			1						2			
25	GK	(Spain)	Olazábal																
27	DF	(Spain)	Patric																
28	FW	(Spain)	Traoré																
29	FW	(Cameroon)	Dongou																

Last updated: 27 April 2014
Source: Competitive matches
Ordered by (red card) , (second yellow card) and (yellow card)
(yellow card) = Number of bookings; (second yellow card) = Number of sending offs after a second yellow card; (red card) = Number of sending offs by a direct red card.

== Pre-season and friendlies ==
Win Draw Loss

24 July 2013 Uli Hoeneß Cup	Bayern Munich	2–0	Barcelona	Munich, Germany
18:30 CEST	Lahm 15'; Mandžukić 87'	Report	Mascherano (yellow card) 41'; Bartra (yellow card) 43'	Stadium: Allianz Arena; Attendance: 71,137; Referee: Felix Brych (Germany)

27 July 2013 VIF 100th Anniversary	Vålerenga	0–7	Barcelona	Oslo, Norway
19:00 CEST		Report	Sánchez 4'; Tello 6'; Messi 13'; Dos Santos 42'; Dongou 52', 55'; Román 86'	Stadium: Ullevaal Stadion; Attendance: 25,572

30 July 2013 Super Mecz	Lechia Gdańsk	2–2	Barcelona	Gdańsk, Poland
20:30 CEST	Bieniuk 15'; Grzelczak 50'	Report	Roberto 26'; Messi 57'	Stadium: PGE Arena Gdańsk; Referee: Paweł Gil (Poland)

2 August 2013 Joan Gamper Trophy	Barcelona	8–0	Santos	Barcelona, Spain
21:30 CEST	Messi 8'; Léo 12' (o.g.); Sánchez 22'; Pedro 29'; Fàbregas 53', 68'; Adriano 75'; Dongou 83'	Report		Stadium: Camp Nou; Attendance: 81,251; Referee: Estrada Fernández (Catalonia)

7 August 2013 Asian Tour 2013 Chang Champions Cup	Thailand U-23	1–7	Barcelona	Bangkok, Thailand
19:00 TST	Dangda 44' (pen.)	Report	Neymar 12'; Messi 14' (pen.), 26'; Pedro 19', 36', 48'; Sánchez 49'	Stadium: Rajamangala Stadium; Attendance: 57,000; Referee: Chaiya Mahapab (Thailand)

10 August 2013 Asian Tour 2013 CIMB Challenge Cup	Malaysian XI	1–3	Barcelona	Kuala Lumpur, Malaysia
20:45 MST	Amri 40'	Report	Fàbregas 32'; Neymar 43'; Piqué 75'	Stadium: Shah Alam Stadium; Attendance: 65,000; Referee: Mohd Abdul Wahab (Malaysia)

== Competitions ==
=== Supercopa de España ===
21 August 2013 First leg	Atlético Madrid	1–1	Barcelona	Madrid
23:00 CEST (UTC+02:00)	Villa 12'; Juanfran (yellow card) 36'; Filipe Luís (yellow card) 39'; Suárez (yellow card) 56'	Report	Busquets (yellow card) 43'; Alba (yellow card) 65'; Neymar 66', (yellow card) 86'	Stadium: Vicente Calderón; Attendance: 54,851; Referee: Alberto Undiano Mallenco (Navarre)

28 August 2013 Second leg	Barcelona	0–0 (1(a) –1 agg.)	Atlético Madrid	Barcelona
23:00 CEST (UTC+02:00)	Fàbregas (yellow card) 28'; Busquets (yellow card) 30'; Piqué (yellow card) 54'	Report	Koke (yellow card) 26'; Filipe Luís (red card) 81'; Gabi (yellow card) 81'; Costa (yellow card) 85'; Godín (yellow card) 89'; Turan (red card) 90+1'	Stadium: Camp Nou; Attendance: 74,536; Referee: David Fernández Borbalán (Andalusia)

=== La Liga ===
==== League table ====
Pos	Team	Pld	W	D	L	GF	GA	GD	Pts	Qualification or relegation
1	Atlético Madrid (C)	38	28	6	4	77	26	+51	90	Qualification for the Champions League group stage
2	Barcelona	38	27	6	5	100	33	+67	87 (Note: Barcelona finished ahead of Real Madrid on head-to-head points: Barcelona 2–1 Real Madrid, Real Madrid 3–4 Barcelona.)	Qualification for the Champions League group stage
3	Real Madrid	38	27	6	5	104	38	+66	87	Qualification for the Champions League group stage
4	Athletic Bilbao	38	20	10	8	66	39	+27	70	Qualification for the Champions League play-off round
5	Sevilla	38	18	9	11	69	52	+17	63	Qualification for the Europa League group stage (Note: Sevilla automatically qualified for the 2014–15 UEFA Europa League group stage as the defending champions; the berth through their league position was vacated.)

Source: La Liga, ESPN
Rules for classification: 1st points; 2nd head-to-head points;
(C) Champions

==== Results by round ====
Round	1	2	3	4	5	6	7	8	9	10	11	12	13	14	15	16	17	18	19	20	21	22	23	24	25	26	27	28	29	30	31	32	33	34	35	36	37	38
Ground	H	A	A	H	A	H	A	H	A	H	A	H	A	H	A	H	A	H	A	A	H	H	A	H	A	H	A	H	A	H	A	H	A	H	A	H	A	H
Result	W	W	W	W	W	W	W	W	D	W	W	W	W	W	L	W	W	W	D	D	W	L	W	W	L	W	L	W	W	W	W	W	L	W	W	D	D	D
Position	1	1	1	1	1	1	1	1	1	1	1	1	1	1	1	1	1	1	1	1	1	2	1	1	2	2	3	3	3	2	2	2	3	3	2	2	2	2

Updated to match(es) played on 18 May 2014. Source: Competitive matches
A = Away; H = Home; W = Win; D = Draw; L = Loss

==== Matches ====
18 August 2013 1	Barcelona	7–0	Levante	Barcelona
19:00 CEST (UTC+02:00)	Sánchez 3'; Messi 12', 42' (pen.); Dani Alves 23'; Pedro 26', 73'; Xavi 45'; Neymar (yellow card) 88'	Report	El Adoua (yellow card) 50'; Rodas (yellow card) 68'; Xumetra (yellow card) 78'	Stadium: Camp Nou; Attendance: 73,812; Referee: Carlos del Cerro Grande (Community of Madrid)

25 August 2013 2	Málaga	0–1	Barcelona	Málaga
21:00 CEST (UTC+02:00)	Gámez (yellow card) 57'; Sánchez (yellow card) 61'; Darder (yellow card) 72'	Report	Adriano 44'; Sánchez (yellow card) 62'; Dani Alves (yellow card) 84'	Stadium: La Rosaleda; Attendance: 28,513; Referee: Antonio Mateu Lahoz (Valencian Community)

1 September 2013 3	Valencia	2–3	Barcelona	Valencia
21:00 CEST (UTC+02:00)	Pereira (yellow card) 16'; Banega (yellow card) 44'; Postiga 45', 45+3'	Report	Messi 11', 39', 41'; Alba (yellow card) 29'; Dani Alves (yellow card) 65'; Neymar (yellow card) 75'	Stadium: Mestalla; Attendance: 45,000; Referee: Fernando Teixeira Vitienes (Cantabria)

14 September 2013 4	Barcelona	3–2	Sevilla	Barcelona
20:00 CEST (UTC+02:00)	Dani Alves 36'; Messi 75'; Adriano (yellow card) 88'; Sánchez 90+4'	Report	Vitolo (yellow card) 8'; Mbia (yellow card) 31'; Jairo (yellow card) 34'; Coke (yellow card) 50', (goal) 90'; Cala (yellow card) 64'; Rakitić 80'	Stadium: Camp Nou; Attendance: 76,765; Referee: César Muñiz Fernández (Asturias)
Note: Substitute goalkeeper José Manuel Pinto was (yellow card) 90+4' for altercations with the rival team.

21 September 2013 5	Rayo Vallecano	0–4	Barcelona	Madrid
20:00 CEST (UTC+02:00)	Trashorras (yellow card) 23', (penalty missed) 36'; Baena (yellow card) 40'	Report	Adriano (yellow card) 32'; Pedro 33', 47', 72'; Fàbregas 80'	Stadium: Campo de Vallecas; Attendance: 11,740; Referee: Carlos Clos Gómez (Aragon)

24 September 2013 6	Barcelona	4–1	Real Sociedad	Barcelona
20:00 CEST (UTC+02:00)	Neymar 5'; Messi 8'; Busquets 23'; Bartra 77'	Report	Agirretxe (yellow card) 55'; De la Bella 64'	Stadium: Camp Nou; Attendance: 70,066; Referee: Jesús Gil Manzano (Extremadura)

28 September 2013 7	Almería	0–2	Barcelona	Almería
18:00 CEST (UTC+02:00)	Verza (yellow card) 28'	Report	Messi 21'; Bartra (yellow card) 26'; Adriano 56'; Busquets (yellow card) 89'	Stadium: Juegos Mediterráneos; Attendance: 11,975; Referee: Miguel Ángel Ayza Gámez (Valencian Community)

5 October 2013 8	Barcelona	4–1	Valladolid	Barcelona
22:00 CEST (UTC+02:00)	Sánchez 14', 64'; Xavi 52'; Neymar 70'	Report	Guerra 10'; Bergdich (yellow card) 33'; Rossi (yellow card) 74'; Omar (yellow card) 90+1'	Stadium: Camp Nou; Attendance: 64,659; Referee: Fernando Teixeira Vitienes (Cantabria)

19 October 2013 9	Osasuna	0–0	Barcelona	Pamplona
20:00 CEST (UTC+02:00)	Bertrán (yellow card) 76'; Torres (yellow card) 90'; Onwu (yellow card) 90+1'	Report	Fàbregas (yellow card) 32'; Adriano (yellow card) 84'	Stadium: El Sadar; Attendance: 16,123; Referee: Pedro Jesús Pérez Montero (Andalusia)

26 October 2013 10	Barcelona	2–1	Real Madrid	Barcelona
18:00 CEST (UTC+02:00)	Busquets (yellow card) 7'; Neymar 19'; Adriano (yellow card) 35'; Sánchez 79'	Report	Ramos (yellow card) 14'; Bale (yellow card) 45'; Khedira (yellow card) 59'; Marcelo (yellow card) 64'; Ronaldo (yellow card) 80'; Jesé 90+1'	Stadium: Camp Nou; Attendance: 98,761; Referee: Alberto Undiano Mallenco (Navarre)

29 October 2013 11	Celta Vigo	0–3	Barcelona	Vigo
22:00 CET (UTC+01:00)	Rafinha (yellow card) 24'; Fernández (yellow card) 34'; Cabral (yellow card) 38'	Report	Sánchez 9'; Yoel 48' (o.g.); Fàbregas (yellow card) 31', (goal) 54'	Stadium: Balaídos; Attendance: 26,636; Referee: David Fernández Borbalán (Andalusia)

1 November 2013 12	Barcelona	1–0	Espanyol	Barcelona
21:00 CET (UTC+01:00)	Sánchez 68'; Mascherano (yellow card) 77'	Report	Fuentes (yellow card) 45'; S. García (yellow card) 65'; Lanzarote (yellow card) 90'	Stadium: Camp Nou; Attendance: 79,977; Referee: Carlos Velasco Carballo (Community of Madrid)

10 November 2013 13	Real Betis	1–4	Barcelona	Sevilla
21:00 CET (UTC+01:00)	Juan Carlos (yellow card) 55'; Nono (yellow card) 66'; Torres (yellow card) 76'; Molina 90+2' (pen.)	Report	Valdés (yellow card) 19'; Neymar 35'; Pedro 37'; Fàbregas 63', 79'; Dani Alves (yellow card) 90+1'	Stadium: Benito Villamarín; Attendance: 40,222; Referee: José Luis González González (Castile and León)

23 November 2013 14	Barcelona	4–0	Granada	Barcelona
16:00 CET (UTC+01:00)	Iniesta 19' (pen.); Neymar (yellow card) 28'; Fàbregas 39' (pen.); Busquets (yellow card) 43'; Sánchez 70'; Pedro 89'	Report	Diakhaté (yellow card) 19'; Iturra (yellow card) 25' (yellow-red card) 66'; El-Arabi (yellow card) 26'	Stadium: Camp Nou; Attendance: 71,518; Referee: Antonio Mateu Lahoz (Valencian Community)

1 December 2013 15	Athletic Bilbao	1–0	Barcelona	Bilbao
21:00 CET (UTC+01:00)	Rico (yellow card) 19'; Iturraspe (yellow card) 57'; Toquero (yellow card) 70'; Muniain 70'	Report	Neymar (yellow card) 54'; Busquets (yellow card) 57'; Mascherano (yellow card) 73'; Adriano (yellow card) 78'	Stadium: San Mamés; Attendance: 35,950; Referee: Juan Martínez Munuera (Valencian Community)

14 December 2013 16	Barcelona	2–1	Villarreal	Barcelona
20:00 CET (UTC+01:00)	Neymar 30' (pen.), 67', (yellow card) 85'	Report	Trigueros (yellow card) 37'; Musacchio 48'	Stadium: Camp Nou; Attendance: 66,130; Referee: Ignacio Iglesias Villanueva (Galicia)

22 December 2013 17	Getafe	2–5	Barcelona	Getafe
17:00 CET (UTC+01:00)	Escudero 10'; López 14', (yellow card) 70'; Mosquera (yellow card) 45'; Borja (yellow card) 84'; Alexis (yellow card) 85'	Report	Dani Alves (yellow card) 30'; Pedro 34', 41', 43'; Piqué (yellow card) 54'; Fàbregas 68', 72' (pen.); Busquets (yellow card) 86'	Stadium: Coliseum Alfonso Pérez; Attendance: 9,563; Referee: Alberto Undiano Mallenco (Navarre)

5 January 2014 18	Barcelona	4–0	Elche	Barcelona
16:00 CET (UTC+01:00)	Sánchez 7', 63', 69'; Pedro 16'; Alba (yellow card) 73'; Fàbregas (yellow card) 73'	Report	Botía (yellow card) 68'; R. Pérez (yellow card) 86'	Stadium: Camp Nou; Attendance: 64,031; Referee: David Fernández Borbalán (Andalusia)

11 January 2014 19	Atlético Madrid	0–0	Barcelona	Madrid
20:00 CET (UTC+01:00)	Gabi (yellow card) 44'; Godín (yellow card) 46'	Report	Alba (yellow card) 57'; Mascherano (yellow card) 72'; Dani Alves (yellow card) 83'	Stadium: Vicente Calderón; Attendance: 54,000; Referee: Antonio Mateu Lahoz (Valencian Community)

19 January 2014 20	Levante	1–1	Barcelona	Valencia
19:00 CET (UTC+01:00)	Vyntra 10'; Ivanschitz (yellow card) 82'; Juanfran (yellow card) 89'; Pinto (yellow card) 90+1'	Report	Piqué 19'; Mascherano (yellow card) 34'	Stadium: Ciutat de València; Attendance: 24,063; Referee: Carlos del Cerro Grande (Community of Madrid)

26 January 2014 21	Barcelona	3–0	Málaga	Barcelona
21:00 CET (UTC+01:00)	Piqué (yellow card) 30', (goal) 40'; Pedro 55'; Sánchez 61'	Report	Pérez (yellow card) 16'; Duda (yellow card) 31'; Flávio (yellow card) 71'	Stadium: Camp Nou; Attendance: 56,355; Referee: Carlos Clos Gómez (Aragon)

1 February 2014 22	Barcelona	2–3	Valencia	Barcelona
16:00 CET (UTC+01:00)	Sánchez 8'; Alba (yellow card) 29' (red card) 78'; Messi 54' (pen.); Mascherano (yellow card) 79'	Report	Parejo 44', (yellow card) 45'; Piatti 48'; Costa (yellow card) 53'; Alcácer 59'; Diego Alves (yellow card) 90'	Stadium: Camp Nou; Attendance: 66,969; Referee: Pedro Jesús Pérez Montero (Andalusia)

9 February 2014 23	Sevilla	1–4	Barcelona	Sevilla
21:00 CET (UTC+01:00)	Moreno 15'; Carriço (yellow card) 39'; Figueiras (yellow card) 70'; Cheryshev (yellow card) 72'	Report	Song (yellow card) 20'; Sánchez 34'; Messi 44', 56'; Pedro (yellow card) 59'; Valdés (yellow card) 68'; Fàbregas 88'	Stadium: Ramón Sánchez Pizjuán; Attendance: 27,500; Referee: José Antonio Teixeira Vitienes (Cantabria)

15 February 2014 24	Barcelona	6–0	Rayo Vallecano	Barcelona
20:00 CET (UTC+01:00)	Adriano 2'; Messi 36', 68'; Sánchez 53'; Pedro 56'; Neymar 89'	Report		Stadium: Camp Nou; Attendance: 74,517; Referee: Juan Martínez Munuera (Valencian Community)

22 February 2014 25	Real Sociedad	3–1	Barcelona	San Sebastián
20:00 CET (UTC+01:00)	José Ángel (yellow card) 23'; Song 32' (o.g.); Griezmann 54'; Zurutuza 59'; Canales (yellow card) 69'	Report	Busquets (yellow card) 22'; Messi 36'; Bartra (yellow card) 39'; Piqué (yellow card) 52'	Stadium: Anoeta; Attendance: 30,485; Referee: David Fernández Borbalán (Andalusia)

2 March 2014 26	Barcelona	4–1	Almería	Barcelona
21:00 CET (UTC+01:00)	Sánchez 9'; Messi 23'; Adriano (yellow card) 26'; Puyol 83'; Xavi 89'	Report	Azeez (yellow card) 17'; Corona (yellow card) 23'; Trujillo 26'; Verza (yellow card) 81'; Tébar (yellow card) 86'	Stadium: Camp Nou; Attendance: 58,930; Referee: Carlos del Cerro Grande (Community of Madrid)

8 March 2014 27	Valladolid	1–0	Barcelona	Valladolid
16:00 CET (UTC+01:00)	Rossi 17', (yellow card) 52'; Bergdich (yellow card) 46'; Peña (yellow card) 75'; Rubio (yellow card) 82'; Sastre (yellow card) 90'	Report	Piqué (yellow card) 65'	Stadium: José Zorrilla; Attendance: 22,921; Referee: Alejandro José Hernández Hernández (Canary Islands)

16 March 2014 28	Barcelona	7–0	Osasuna	Barcelona
17:00 CET (UTC+01:00)	Messi 18', 63', 88'; Sánchez 22'; Iniesta 34'; Mascherano (yellow card) 58'; Tello 78'; Pedro 90+1'	Report	Arribas (yellow card) 48'; Cejudo (yellow card) 82'	Stadium: Camp Nou; Attendance: 71,764; Referee: José Antonio Teixeira Vitienes (Cantabria)

23 March 2014 29	Real Madrid	3–4	Barcelona	Madrid
21:00 CET (UTC+01:00)	Benzema 20', 24'; Di María (yellow card) 35'; Pepe (yellow card) 43'; Ronaldo 55' (pen.), (yellow card) 85'; Ramos (red card) 63'; Alonso (yellow card) 85'; Modrić (yellow card) 88'	Report	Iniesta 7'; Messi 42', 65' (pen.), 84' (pen.); Fàbregas (yellow card) 43'; Busquets (yellow card) 66'	Stadium: Santiago Bernabéu; Attendance: 85,454; Referee: Alberto Undiano Mallenco (Navarre)

26 March 2014 30	Barcelona	3–0	Celta Vigo	Barcelona
20:00 CET (UTC+01:00)	Neymar 6', 67'; Adriano (yellow card) 20'; Messi 30'; Alba (yellow card) 45'	Report	Fernández (yellow card) 75'; Mallo (yellow card) 83'	Stadium: Camp Nou; Attendance: 67,162; Referee: Miguel Ángel Ayza Gámez (Valencian Community)

29 March 2014 31	Espanyol	0–1	Barcelona	Cornellà de Llobregat
16:00 CET (UTC+01:00)	Stuani (yellow card) 15'; Colotto (yellow card) 35'; López (yellow card) 75'; Casilla (red card) 83'; Sánchez (yellow card) 84'	Report	Busquets (yellow card) 45+1'; Messi 77' (pen.); Alba (yellow card) 90+4'	Stadium: Cornellà-El Prat; Attendance: 31.666; Referee: Carlos Clos Gómez (Aragon)

5 April 2014 32	Barcelona	3–1	Real Betis	Barcelona
18:00 CEST (UTC+02:00)	Messi 14' (pen.), 86'; Figueras 67' (o.g.)	Report	Reyes (yellow card) 60'; Castro 69'; Amaya (yellow card) 77'	Stadium: Camp Nou; Attendance: 81,978; Referee: Eduardo Prieto Iglesias (Navarre)

12 April 2014 33	Granada	1–0	Barcelona	Granada
20:00 CEST (UTC+02:00)	Brahimi 16'	Report	Neymar (yellow card) 44'; Messi (yellow card) 65'; Busquets (yellow card) 67'	Stadium: Los Cármenes; Attendance: 16,500; Referee: Carlos Delgado Ferreiro (Basque Country)

20 April 2014 34	Barcelona	2–1	Athletic Bilbao	Barcelona
21:00 CEST (UTC+02:00)	Bartra (yellow card) 21'; Pedro 71', (yellow card) 79'; Messi 74'	Report	Iturraspe (yellow card) 7'; Aduriz 49'; Herrera (yellow card) 72'; De Marcos (yellow card) 74'	Stadium: Camp Nou; Attendance: 57,090; Referee: Juan Martínez Munuera (Valencian Community)

27 April 2014 35	Villarreal	2–3	Barcelona	Villarreal
21:00 CEST (UTC+02:00)	Cani 45+1', (yellow card) 90'; Trigueros 55', (yellow card) 89'; Mario (yellow card) 56'	Report	Sánchez (yellow card) 50'; Gabriel 65' (o.g.); Musacchio 78' (o.g.); Messi 83'; Busquets (yellow card) 85'; Dani Alves (yellow card) 90+1'	Stadium: El Madrigal; Attendance: 22,839; Referee: David Fernández Borbalán (Andalusia)

3 May 2014 36	Barcelona	2–2	Getafe	Barcelona
16:00 CEST (UTC+02:00)	Messi 23'; Mascherano (yellow card) 36'; Dani Alves (yellow card) 38'; Sánchez 67'; Adriano (yellow card) 90'	Report	Lafita 37', 90+2', (yellow card) 47'; Gavilán (yellow card) 65'; Codina (yellow card) 90+2'	Stadium: Camp Nou; Attendance: 70,110; Referee: José Antonio Teixeira Vitienes (Cantabria)

11 May 2014 37	Elche	0–0	Barcelona	Elche
19:00 CEST (UTC+02:00)	Pelegrín (yellow card) 28'; Cisma (yellow card) 42'; Pérez (yellow card) 65'	Report	Sánchez (yellow card) 50'; Mascherano (yellow card) 55'; Pedro (yellow card) 62'	Stadium: Martínez Valero; Attendance: 33,069; Referee: Fernando Teixeira Vitienes (Cantabria)

17 May 2014 38	Barcelona	1–1	Atlético Madrid	Barcelona
18:00 CEST (UTC+02:00)	Piqué (yellow card) 5'; Sánchez 33'; Messi (yellow card) 45+3'; Busquets (yellow card) 45+3'; Song (yellow card) 73'; Mascherano (yellow card) 90'	Report	Godín (yellow card) 36', (goal) 49'; Tiago (yellow card) 37'; Filipe Luís (yellow card) 69'; García (yellow card) 90+2'	Stadium: Camp Nou; Attendance: 96,973; Referee: Antonio Mateu Lahoz (Valencian Community)

=== Copa del Rey ===
==== Round of 32 ====
6 December 2013 First leg	Cartagena	1–4	Barcelona	Cartagena
22:00 CET (UTC+01:00)	Fernando 16'; Astrain (yellow card) 25'; Riau (yellow card) 42'	Report	Pedro 36', 76'; Fàbregas 43'; Dongou 90'	Stadium: Cartagonova; Attendance: 13,126; Referee: Carlos del Cerro Grande (Community of Madrid)

17 December 2013 Second leg	Barcelona	3–0 (7–1 agg.)	Cartagena	Barcelona
22:00 CET (UTC+01:00)	Pedro 31'; Puyol (yellow card) 60'; Sánchez 68' (o.g.); Neymar 88'	Report	De Lerma (yellow card) 63'; Carlos David (yellow card) 84'	Stadium: Camp Nou; Attendance: 47,280; Referee: Pedro Jesús Pérez Montero (Andalusia)

==== Round of 16 ====
8 January 2014 First leg	Barcelona	4–0	Getafe	Barcelona
22:00 CET (UTC+01:00)	Fàbregas 9', 63' (pen.); Montoya (yellow card) 85'; Messi 90', 90+3'	Report	Gavilán (yellow card) 57'; Valera (yellow card) 62'; Alexis (yellow card) 63'; Rodríguez (yellow card) 88'	Stadium: Camp Nou; Attendance: 39,299; Referee: José Luis González González (Castile and León)

16 January 2014 Second leg	Getafe	0–2 (0–6 agg.)	Barcelona	Getafe
22:00 CET (UTC+01:00)	Alexis (yellow card) 16'; Rodríguez (yellow card) 20'; López (yellow card) 58'	Report	Messi 44', 63'	Stadium: Coliseum Alfonso Pérez; Attendance: 4,000; Referee: Jesús Gil Manzano (Extremadura)

==== Quarter-finals ====
22 January 2014 First leg	Levante	1–4	Barcelona	Valencia
22:00 CET (UTC+01:00)	Nagore (yellow card) 12'; El Zhar 31'	Report	Bartra (yellow card) 26'; Juanfran 53' (o.g.); Tello 60', 81', 86'; Adriano (yellow card) 71'	Stadium: Ciutat de València; Attendance: 18,352; Referee: Alejandro Hernández Hernández (Canary Islands)

29 January 2014 Second leg	Barcelona	5–1 (9–2 agg.)	Levante	Barcelona
22:00 CET (UTC+01:00)	Roberto (yellow card) 11'; Adriano 28'; Song (yellow card) 39'; Puyol 44'; Sánchez 50', 52'; Fàbregas 68'	Report	Roberto 9' (o.g.); Pinto (yellow card) 25'; Camarasa (yellow card) 40'; El Adoua (yellow card) 53'	Stadium: Camp Nou; Attendance: 25,551; Referee: Alberto Undiano Mallenco (Navarre)

==== Semi-finals ====
5 February 2014 First leg	Barcelona	2–0	Real Sociedad	Barcelona
22:00 CET (UTC+01:00)	Busquets (yellow card) 26', (goal) 44'; Mascherano (yellow card) 36'; Zubikarai 60' (o.g.); Messi (yellow card) 72'	Report	Vela (yellow card) 39'; I. Martínez (red card) 44'; Elustondo (yellow card) 57'; Gaztañaga (yellow card) 62'; Zubikarai (yellow card) 87'; Zaldúa (yellow card) 89'	Stadium: Camp Nou; Attendance: 38,505; Referee: José Luis González González (Castile and León)

12 February 2014 Second leg	Real Sociedad	1–1 (1–3 agg.)	Barcelona	San Sebastián
22:00 CET (UTC+01:00)	Vela (yellow card) 31'; Gaztañaga (yellow card) 52'; Zurutuza (yellow card) 56'; Griezmann 87'		Busquets (yellow card) 26'; Messi 27'; Fàbregas (yellow card) 89'	Stadium: Anoeta; Attendance: 26,000; Referee: Fernando Teixeira Vitienes (Cantabria)

==== Final ====
16 April 2014 Final	Barcelona	1–2	Real Madrid	Valencia
21:30 CEST (UTC+02:00)	Neymar (yellow card) 17'; Mascherano (yellow card) 53'; Bartra 68'		Isco (yellow card) 3'; Di María 11'; Pepe (yellow card) 17'; Bale 85'; Alonso (yellow card) 88'	Stadium: Mestalla Stadium; Attendance: 52,953; Referee: Antonio Mateu Lahoz (Valencian Community)

=== UEFA Champions League ===
==== Group stage ====
Pos	Team	Pld	W	D	L	GF	GA	GD	Pts	Qualification	BAR	MIL	AJX	CEL
1	(Spain) Barcelona	6	4	1	1	16	5	+11	13	Advance to knockout phase	—	3–1	4–0	6–1
2	(Italy) Milan	6	2	3	1	8	5	+3	9	Advance to knockout phase	1–1	—	0–0	2–0
3	(Netherlands) Ajax	6	2	2	2	5	8	−3	8	Transfer to Europa League	2–1	1–1	—	1–0
4	(Scotland) Celtic	6	1	0	5	3	14	−11	3		0–1	0–3	2–1	—

Source: UEFA

18 September 2013 1	Barcelona (Spain)	4–0	(Netherlands) Ajax	Barcelona, Spain
20:45 CEST (UTC+02:00)	Messi 21', 55', 75'; Piqué 69'	Report	Moisander (yellow card) 26'; Denswil (yellow card) 85'	Stadium: Camp Nou; Attendance: 79,412; Referee: Svein Oddvar Moen (Norway)

1 October 2013 2	Celtic (Scotland)	0–1	(Spain) Barcelona	Glasgow, Scotland
20:45 CEST (UTC+02:00)	Lustig (yellow card) 44'; Brown (red card) 59'; Samaras (yellow card) 77'; Izaguirre (yellow card) 86'	Report	Fàbregas (yellow card) 55', (goal) 76'; Busquets (yellow card) 75'	Stadium: Celtic Park; Attendance: 60,800; Referee: Stéphane Lannoy (France)

22 October 2013 3	Milan (Italy)	1–1	(Spain) Barcelona	Milan, Italy
20:45 CEST (UTC+02:00)	Robinho 9'; Montolivo (yellow card) 41'; Muntari (yellow card) 78'	Report	Messi 23'; Sánchez (yellow card) 33'; Fàbregas (yellow card) 81'	Stadium: San Siro; Attendance: 74,487; Referee: Felix Brych (Germany)

6 November 2013 4	Barcelona (Spain)	3–1	(Italy) Milan	Barcelona, Spain
20:45 CET (UTC+01:00)	Messi 30' (pen.), 83'; Busquets 39'; Sánchez (yellow card) 62'	Report	Abate (yellow card) 29'; Muntari (yellow card) 32'; Piqué 45' (o.g.); De Jong (yellow card) 56'	Stadium: Camp Nou; Attendance: 80,517; Referee: Milorad Mažić (Serbia)

26 November 2013 5	Ajax (Netherlands)	2–1	(Spain) Barcelona	Amsterdam, Netherlands
20:45 CET (UTC+01:00)	Schöne (yellow card) 8'; Serero 19'; Hoesen 42'; Veltman (red card) 48'; Van Rhijn (yellow card) 59'	Report	Piqué (yellow card) 31'; Fàbregas (yellow card) 39'; Xavi 49' (pen.); Iniesta (yellow card) 52'; Neymar (yellow card) 53'	Stadium: Amsterdam Arena; Attendance: 53,000; Referee: Pavel Královec (Czech Republic)

11 December 2013 6	Barcelona (Spain)	6–1	(Scotland) Celtic	Barcelona, Spain
20:45 CET (UTC+01:00)	Piqué 7'; Pedro 40'; Roberto (yellow card) 41'; Neymar 44', 48', 58'; Tello 72'	Report	Brown (yellow card) 40'; Matthews (yellow card) 69'; Samaras 88'	Stadium: Camp Nou; Attendance: 54,342; Referee: Sergei Karasev (Russia)

==== Knockout phase ====
===== Round of 16 =====
18 February 2014 First leg	Manchester City (England)	0–2	(Spain) Barcelona	Manchester, England
20:45 CET (UTC+01:00)	Negredo (yellow card) 28'; Kolarov (yellow card) 37'; Demichelis (red card) 53'	Report	Dani Alves (yellow card) 23', (goal) 90+1'; Messi 54' (pen.); Mascherano (yellow card) 76'	Stadium: Etihad Stadium; Attendance: 46,033; Referee: Jonas Eriksson (Sweden)

12 March 2014 Second leg	Barcelona (Spain)	2–1 (4–1 agg.)	(England) Manchester City	Barcelona, Spain
20:45 CET (UTC+01:00)	Fàbregas (yellow card) 54'; Messi 67'; Dani Alves 90+1'	Report	Fernandinho (yellow card) 9'; Kolarov (yellow card) 23'; Zabaleta (yellow card) 30' (yellow-red card) 78'; Kompany (yellow card) 73', (goal) 89'	Stadium: Camp Nou; Attendance: 85,957; Referee: Stéphane Lannoy (France)

===== Quarter-finals =====
1 April 2014 First leg	Barcelona (Spain)	1–1	(Spain) Atlético Madrid	Barcelona, Spain
20:45 CEST (UTC+02:00)	Iniesta (yellow card) 56'; Alba (yellow card) 58'; Neymar 71'	Report	Koke (yellow card) 19'; Gabi (yellow card) 38'; Turan (yellow card) 44'; Juanfran (yellow card) 52'; Diego 56', (yellow card) 80'; Sosa (yellow card) 90'	Stadium: Camp Nou; Attendance: 79,941; Referee: Felix Brych (Germany)

9 April 2014 Second leg	Atlético Madrid (Spain)	1–0 (2–1 agg.)	(Spain) Barcelona	Madrid, Spain
20:45 CEST (UTC+02:00)	Koke 5', (yellow card) 90+1'	Report	Busquets (yellow card) 18'; Mascherano (yellow card) 90+2'; Dani Alves (yellow card) 90+3'	Stadium: Vicente Calderón; Attendance: 53,592; Referee: Howard Webb (England)

=== Copa Catalunya ===
13 May 2014 Semi-finals	Girona	2–3	Barcelona	Girona
21:30 CEST (UTC+02:00)	Chando 35', 68'	Report	Babunski 18'; Cuenca 66' (pen.); Ilie 78'	Stadium: Montilivi; Attendance: 7,000; Referee: Simón Del Pino (Catalonia)

21 May 2014 Final	Barcelona	0–0 (3–2 p)	Espanyol	Girona
21:30 CEST (UTC+02:00)		Report		Stadium: Montilivi
	Penalties
	Patric (penalty scored) Kaptoum (penalty scored) Suárez (penalty missed) Grimaldo (penalty missed) Munir (penalty scored)		(penalty missed) Rodríguez (penalty scored) Monzó (penalty missed) Raíllo (penalty scored) Borja (penalty missed) Morillas
