= Uli Hoeneß Cup =

Bayern Munich	Barcelona
(Germany)	(Spain)
2	0
- Date: 24 July 2013
- Venue: Allianz Arena, Munich
- Referee: Felix Brych (Germany)
- Attendance: 71,137

The Uli Hoeneß Cup was a pre-season association football match that took place on 24 July 2013 at the Allianz Arena in Munich, Germany. The competition featured hosts and 2012–13 UEFA Champions League winner Bayern Munich and the 2012–13 Spanish champions Barcelona. The game was the first that Bayern Munich's new manager Pep Guardiola contested against his former club Barcelona and was a late 60th birthday present for Bayern Munich club president Uli Hoeneß. The entire proceeds were donated towards social purposes. The original planned kick-off time (20:30) was changed because of the 2013 UEFA Women's Championship semi-final match between Sweden and Germany.

== Participating teams ==
- Bayern Munich (Germany)
- Barcelona (Spain)

== Match ==
=== Details ===
24 July 2013
18:30 CEST

Bayern Munich (Germany)	2–0	(Spain) Barcelona
Lahm 15'; Mandžukić 87'	Report

Allianz Arena, Munich
Attendance: 71,137
Referee: Felix Brych (Germany)

Bayern Munich	Barcelona

GK	1	(Germany) Manuel Neuer	(substituted off) 46'
RB	13	(Brazil) Rafinha	(substituted off) 73'
CB	4	(Brazil) Dante	(substituted off) 58'
CB	17	(Germany) Jérôme Boateng	(substituted off) 67'
LB	27	(Austria) David Alaba
DM	6	(Spain) Thiago	(substituted off) 73'
CM	21	(Germany) Philipp Lahm (c)	(substituted off) 58'
CM	39	(Germany) Toni Kroos	(substituted off) 67'
RW	10	(Netherlands) Arjen Robben	(substituted off) 46'
LW	7	(France) Franck Ribéry	(substituted off) 67'
CF	25	(Germany) Thomas Müller	(substituted off) 46'
Substitutes:
GK	22	(Germany) Tom Starke	(substituted on) 46'
DF	5	(Belgium) Daniel Van Buyten	(substituted on) 58'
DF	15	(Germany) Jan Kirchhoff	(substituted on) 67'
DF	26	(Germany) Diego Contento	(substituted on) 67'
MF	11	(Switzerland) Xherdan Shaqiri	(substituted on) 46'
MF	23	(Germany) Mitchell Weiser
MF	30	(Brazil) Luiz Gustavo	(substituted on) 58'
MF	31	(Germany) Bastian Schweinsteiger	(substituted on) 67'
MF	34	(Denmark) Pierre-Emile Højbjerg
MF	36	(Germany) Emre Can	(substituted on) 73'
FW	9	(Croatia) Mario Mandžukić	(substituted on) 46'
FW	14	(Peru) Claudio Pizarro	(substituted on) 73'
Manager:
(Spain) Pep Guardiola

GK	13	(Spain) José Manuel Pinto		(substituted off) 46'
RB	2	(Spain) Martín Montoya		(substituted off) 46'
CB	15	(Spain) Marc Bartra	(yellow card) 43'	(substituted off) 46'
CB	14	(Argentina) Javier Mascherano	(yellow card) 41'	(substituted off) 46'
LB	21	(Brazil) Adriano		(substituted off) 46'
DM	17	(Cameroon) Alex Song		(substituted off) 46'
CM	12	(Mexico) Jonathan dos Santos		(substituted off) 46'
CM	24	(Spain) Sergi Roberto		(substituted off) 46'
RW	9	(Chile) Alexis Sánchez		(substituted off) 46'
LW	20	(Spain) Cristian Tello		(substituted off) 46'
CF	10	(Argentina) Lionel Messi (c)		(substituted off) 46'
Substitutes:
GK	25	(Spain) Oier Olazábal		(substituted on) 46'
DF	3	(Spain) Sergi Gómez		(substituted on) 46'
DF	4	(Spain) Ilie		(substituted on) 46'
DF	18	(Spain) Carles Planas		(substituted on) 46'
MF	6	(Spain) Jordi Quintillà		(substituted on) 46'
MF	7	(Spain) Kiko Femenía		(substituted on) 46'
MF	8	(Spain) Javier Espinosa		(substituted on) 46'
MF	11	(Spain) Joan Ángel Román		(substituted on) 46'
MF	16	(Spain) Dani Nieto		(substituted on) 46'
MF	22	(Spain) Patric		(substituted on) 46'
MF	23	(Spain) Sergi Samper
FW	19	(Cameroon) Jean Marie Dongou		(substituted on) 46'
Manager:
(Spain) Jordi Roura
