= Sergio Busquets =

Spanish footballer (born 1988)

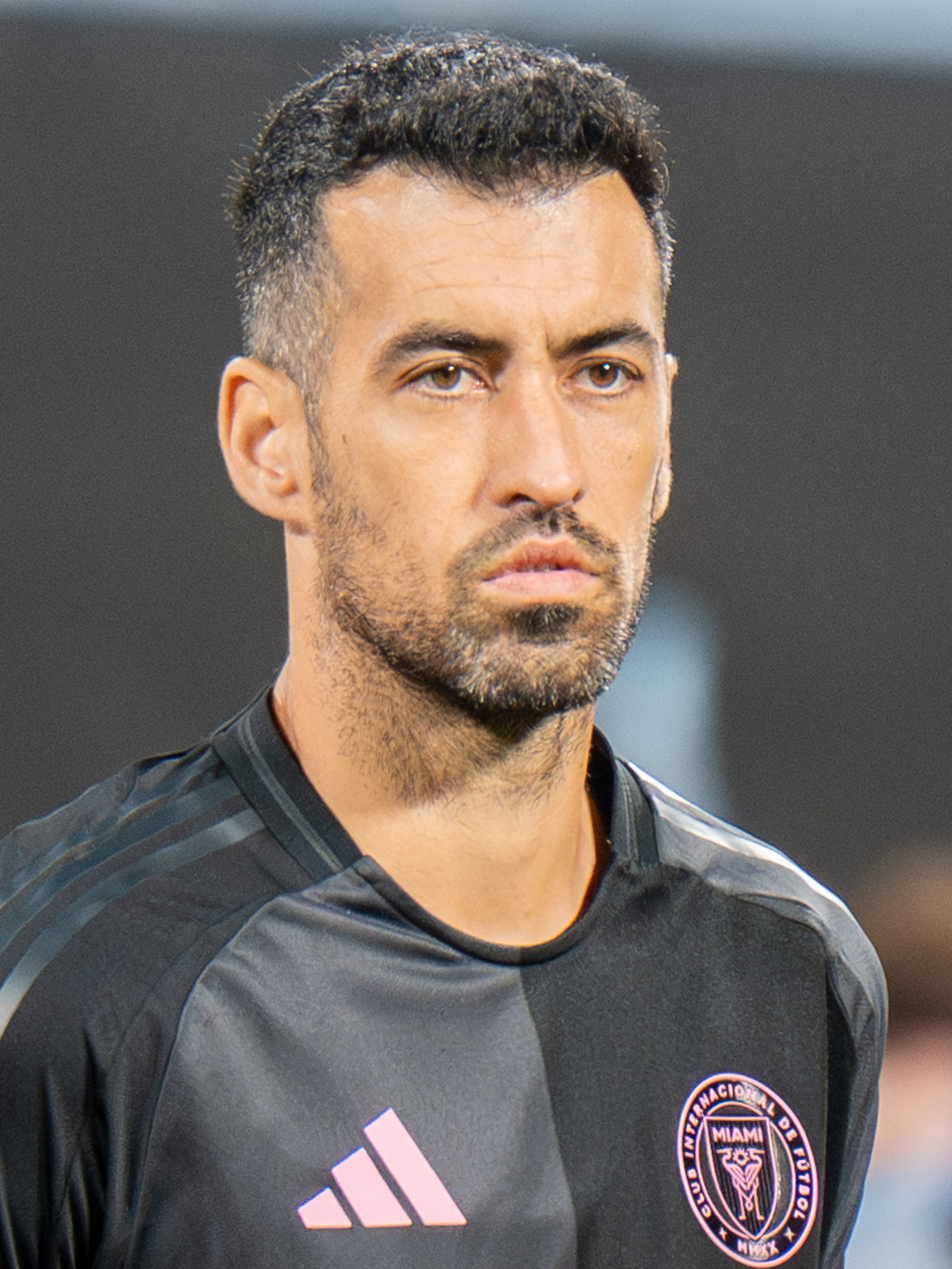
- Busquets with Inter Miami in 2025

Personal information
- Full name: Sergio Busquets Burgos
- Date of birth: 16 July 1988 (age 38)
- Place of birth: Sabadell, Spain
- Height: 1.89 m (6 ft 2 in)
- Position: Defensive midfielder

Team information
- Current team: Barcelona B (assistant manager)

Youth career
- 1996–1999: Barberà Andalucía
- 1999–2003: Lleida
- 2003–2005: Jàbac Terrassa
- 2005–2007: Barcelona

Senior career*
Years	Team	Apps	(Gls)
2007–2008	Barcelona B	25	(2)
2008–2023	Barcelona	481	(11)
2023–2025	Inter Miami	74	(1)
Total		580	(14)

International career
2008–2009	Spain U21	3	(1)
2009–2022	Spain	143	(2)
2008–2016	Catalonia	8	(0)

Managerial career
- 2026–: Barcelona B (assistant manager)
Medal record
Men's football
Representing Spain
FIFA World Cup
Winner	2010 South Africa
UEFA European Championship
Winner	2012 Poland–Ukraine
Third place	2020 Europe
FIFA Confederations Cup
Runner-up	2013 Brazil
Third place	2009 South Africa
UEFA Nations League
Runner-up	2021 Italy
- * Club domestic league appearances and goals

Sergio Busquets Burgos (Catalan: [busˈkɛts], Spanish: [ˈseɾxjo βusˈket]; (Note: In isolation, Busquets is pronounced [busˈkets].) born 16 July 1988) is a Spanish former professional footballer who played as a defensive midfielder and spent most of his career at La Liga club Barcelona. He is currently the assistant manager of Segunda Federación club Barcelona B. A deep-lying playmaker known for his short and calm passing and singular reading of the game, Busquets is regarded as one of the best defensive midfielders of all time. In addition, he is also one of a select number of players who have amassed over 1,000 career appearances.

Busquets arrived in Barcelona's first team in July 2008 and went on to receive the La Liga's Breakthrough Player in 2009. From the 2009–10 season, he was a first team regular and was a key playing contributor to the club for 14 years, until his departure at the end of the 2022–23 season. Busquets made over 700 total appearances for the club, winning 33 trophies, including nine La Liga titles, seven Copa del Rey titles and three UEFA Champions Leagues. With the initial management guidance by Pep Guardiola and using the tiki-taka football philosophy, Busquets was part of a widely lauded midfield combination trio with Andrés Iniesta and Xavi; from 2008 to 2015 the trio together were instrumental in Barcelona's exceptional on-field successes in seven seasons, winning five La Liga titles, three Copa del Rey titles, three Champions League titles and the continental treble (all three titles simultaneously) twice, in 2008–09 and 2014–15. After joining Major League Soccer side Inter Miami in 2023 and winning three trophies, Busquets retired from football at the end of the 2025 season.

Busquets made his senior international debut for Spain in April 2009, making 143 appearances for the national side, scoring twice. He helped his country win the 2010 FIFA World Cup and UEFA Euro 2012 tournaments, and he also featured at three other World Cups and two European Championships. He retired from international football following the 2022 World Cup.

== Club career ==
=== Barcelona ===
Born in Sabadell, Barcelona, Catalonia, Busquets began playing football with local team Badia del Vallès, followed by spells with Barberà Andalucía, Lleida and Jàbac Terrassa, before joining Barcelona's youth ranks in 2005. He scored seven goals in 26 games for the Juvenil A team in his second season and, two years later, Busquets was promoted to the B team under Pep Guardiola, and helped them achieve promotion to the third division. In that same season, he would make his first-team debut, coming on as a substitute in the Copa Catalunya.

"Positionally, he seems like a veteran with or without the ball. With the ball he makes what is difficult look easy: he disposes of the ball with one or two touches. Without the ball, he gives us a lesson: that of being in the right place to intercept and running just to recover the ball."

— Johan Cruyff, 15 September 2008

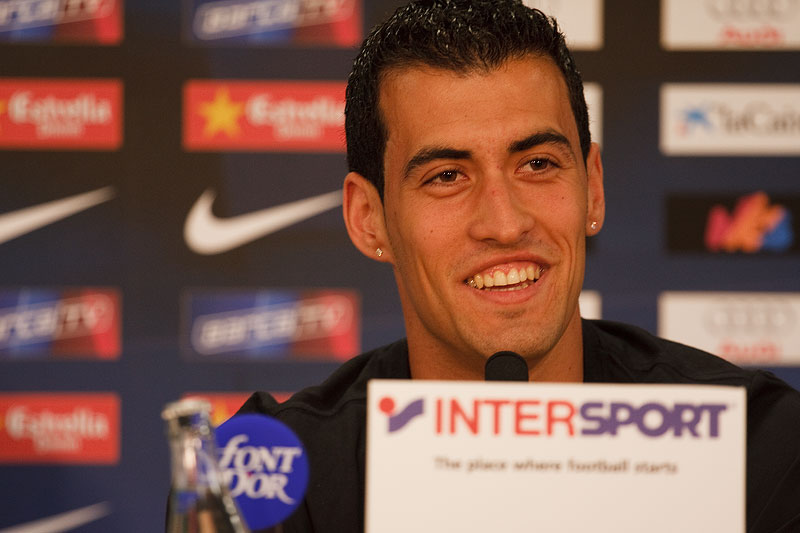
Busquets attending a press conference for Barcelona in 2009

Busquets played his first La Liga match on 13 September 2008, featuring 90 minutes in a 1–1 home draw to Racing Santander. During Barcelona's 2008–09 UEFA Champions League clash against Basel at St. Jakob-Park on 22 October 2008, he scored the second goal in the 15th minute in a 5–0 group stage win; in early December, in another start, he scored his second with Barça in the competition, netting in the 83rd minute of a 2–3 home loss against Shakhtar Donetsk.

On 22 December 2008, Busquets signed a contract extension until 2013 with a buy-out clause of €80 million. On 7 March 2009, he scored his first league goal, in a 2–0 home win over Athletic Bilbao.

On 27 May 2009, having been regularly played as he competed for the spot with internationals Seydou Keita and Yaya Touré, he also featured in Barcelona's starting eleven in the Champions League final, a 2–0 win over Manchester United in Rome; with that victory, Carles Busquets and Sergio Busquets became only the third father-and-son combo to both have won Europe's top club competition playing for the same team, joining Cesare Maldini and Paolo Maldini (won it with Milan) and Manuel Sanchís and Manolo Sanchís (Real Madrid).

Busquets' fine form continued in the 2009–10 campaign, with Guardiola preferring him to Touré as Barcelona's central holding midfielder. In the second leg of the Champions League semi-final 1–0 victory (and an eventual 2–3 aggregate defeat) against Inter Milan at the Camp Nou on 28 April 2010, he went down to the ground after Thiago Motta had raised his arm and appeared to push Busquets directly in the face. As a result of this action, the former was shown a red card and dismissed for violent conduct, whilst the latter was subsequently criticised by both Motta and the media for apparently feigning injury.

Busquets was again ever-present in 2010–11, even playing as a centre back on occasions. On 27 January 2011, he signed a contract extension that would keep him at the club until 2015 – the buyout clause was increased to €150 million. On 8 March 2011, playing at centre back, he scored an own goal from a corner kick against Arsenal, in the season's Champions League round-of-16, levelling the score at 1–1; Barcelona eventually won the game 3–1 (and 4–3 on aggregate). On 28 May, Busquets played the full match during his side's 3–1 Champions league final victory against Manchester United at Wembley.

Busquets scored a rare goal on 24 April 2012 – only his sixth official one in four years – netting from an easy tap-in after an Isaac Cuenca cross to make it 1–0 for the hosts in the second leg of the Champions League semi-finals against Chelsea. Barcelona could only draw 2–2 against ten men as the English club came back from being 0–2 down; his team eventually lost 2–3 on aggregate, after already having lost 1–0 in the first leg at Stamford Bridge.

On 16 July 2013, the day he celebrated his 25th birthday, Busquets agreed to a new deal until 2018, with the buyout clause remaining unaltered. On 1 August 2014, after the retirement of long time club captain and defender Carles Puyol and at the veteran's personal request, he was given the number 5 shirt for the upcoming campaign and was named one of the four captains for the club alongside Xavi, Andrés Iniesta and Lionel Messi.

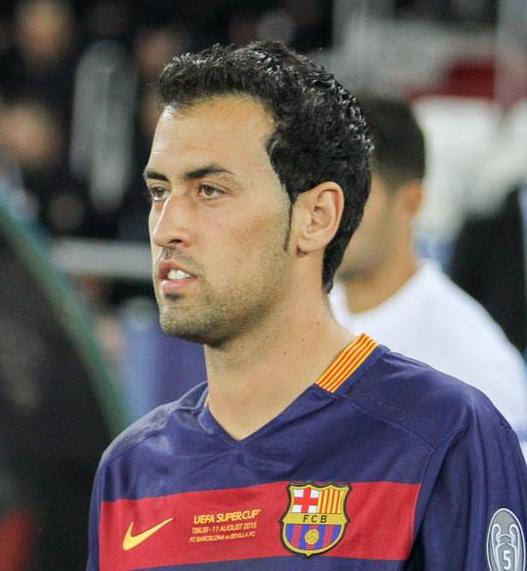
Busquets during the 2015 UEFA Super Cup against Sevilla

Busquets started on 6 June in the 2015 Champions League final, as the team won their fifth accolade in the competition by beating Juventus 3–1 at Berlin's Olympiastadion. This made Barcelona the first club in history to win the treble of domestic league, domestic cup and European Cup twice, and Dani Alves, Busquets, Andrés Iniesta, Lionel Messi, Pedro, Gerard Piqué and Xavi the only players to achieve the same feat.

On 3 October 2015, Busquets captained Barcelona for the first time in the absence of regular captain Iniesta and vice-captain Messi in a 1–2 away defeat to Sevilla.

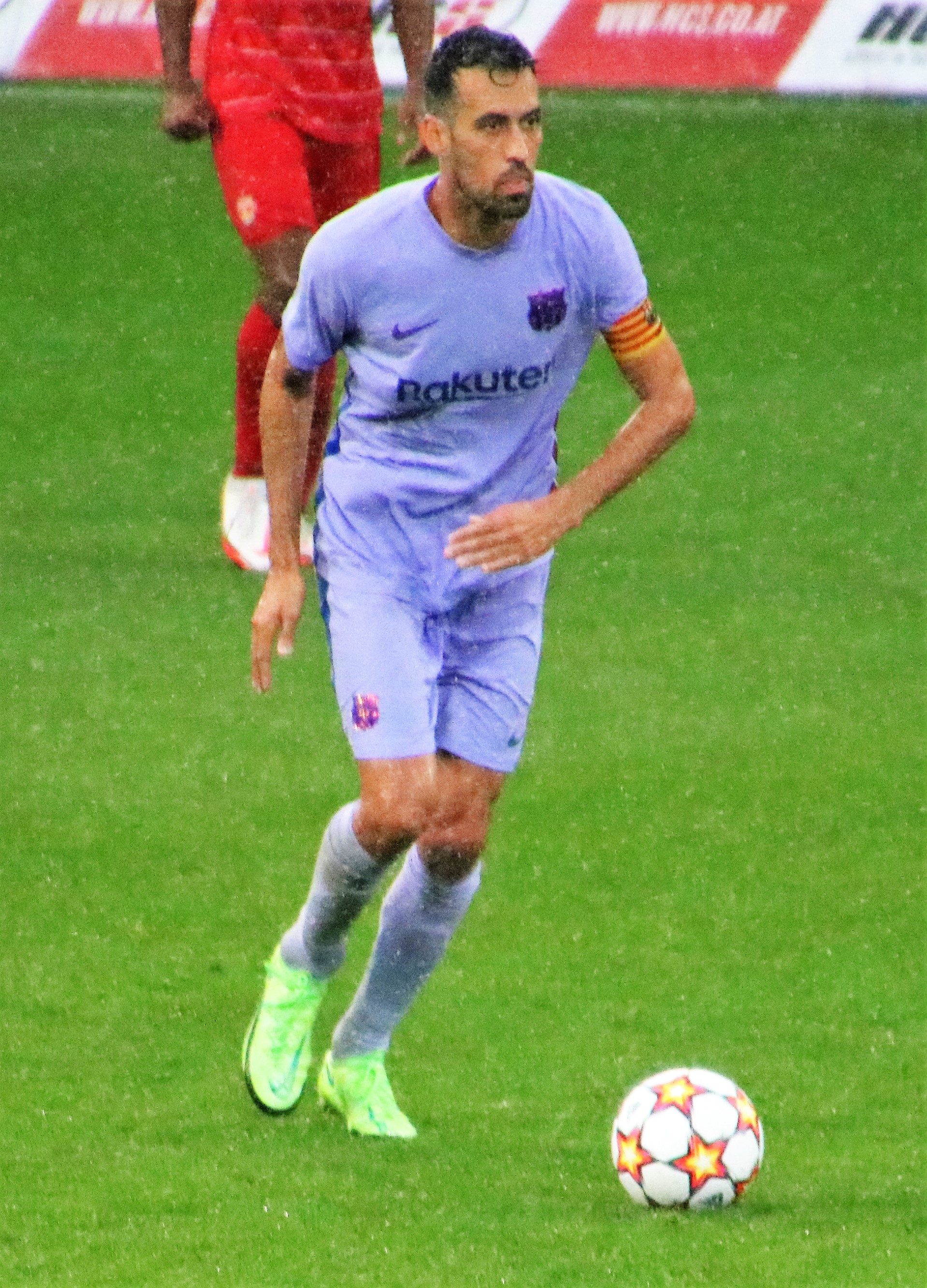
Busquets playing for Barcelona in 2021

Busquets opened the scoring in a 3–0 win against Las Palmas on 1 October 2017, with the match being played behind closed doors at the Camp Nou due to the ongoing Catalan independence referendum. Around a year later, he signed a new contract until June 2023, which increased his buyout clause from €200 million to €500 million. On 24 November 2018 he played his 500th game for Barcelona away to Atlético Madrid, and he made his 100th Champions League appearance on 11 December, in a 1–1 group stage home draw against Tottenham Hotspur.

On 9 January 2021, Busquets made his 600th appearance for Barcelona in a 4–0 win against Granada at the Los Cármenes. Only his contemporaries Xavi, Iniesta and Messi had played more games in the history of the club. In August, he became club captain after Messi left for Paris Saint-Germain. On 12 January 2023, Busquets made his 700th appearance for Barcelona in his team's penalty shoot-out victory after a 2–2 draw against Real Betis at the King Fahd International Stadium in 2023 Supercopa de España semi-final. In the next match, three days later, Busquets participated in his team's 3–1 win against Real Madrid in the 2023 Supercopa de España final, becoming the player with the most matches in the history of El Clásico with 45 matches, jointly with Lionel Messi and Sergio Ramos. In addition he became the player with the most wins in El Clásico matches, with 21 matches, jointly with Paco Gento. On 2 March, in the next El Clásico match, Busquets broke both records as Barcelona won 0–1 in the first leg of the 2023 Copa del Rey semi-final.

On 10 May 2023, Busquets announced he would leave Barcelona by the end of the season.

=== Inter Miami ===
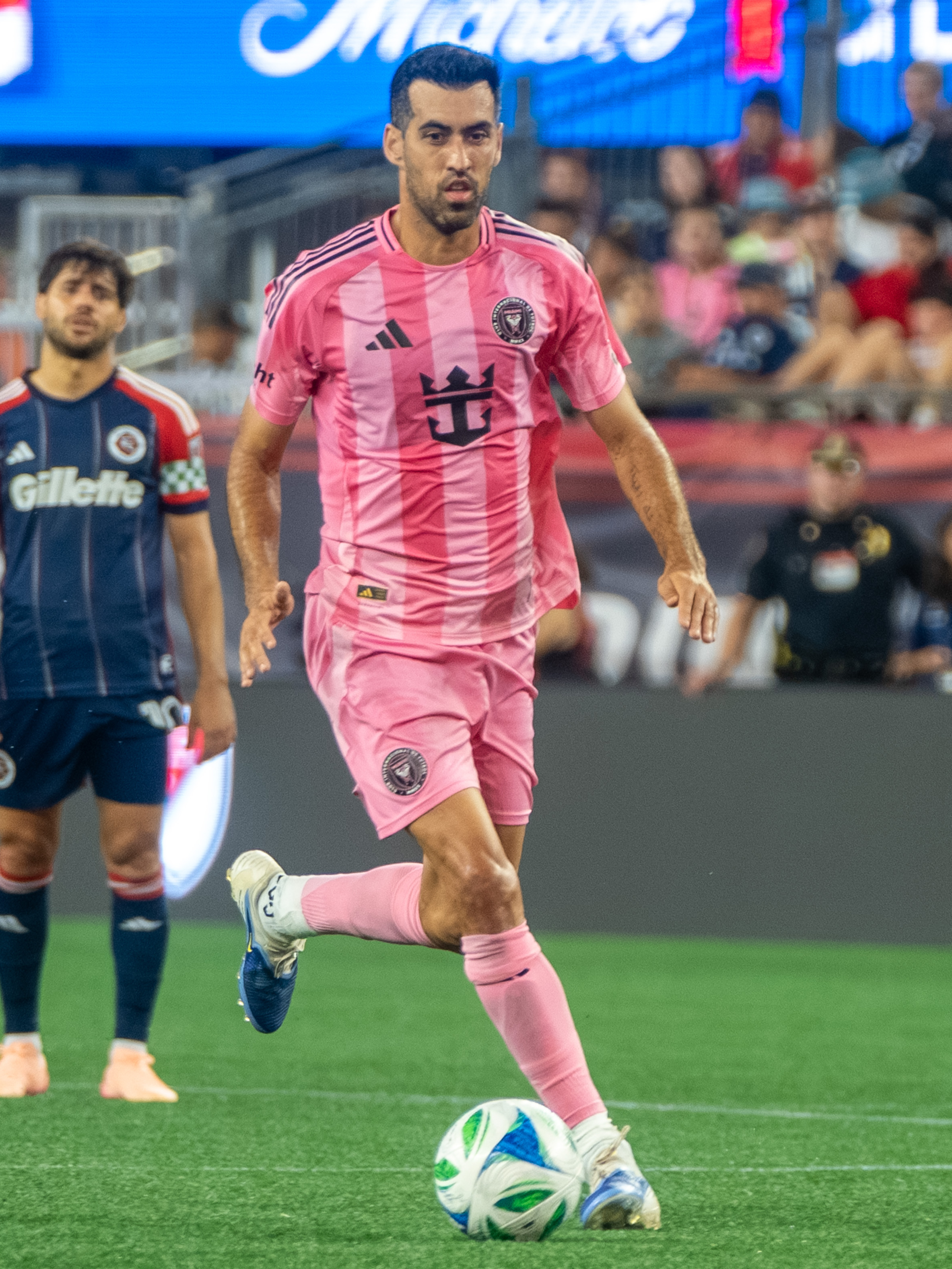
Busquets with Inter Miami in 2025

On 23 June 2023, Inter Miami announced that they had signed Busquets. On 16 July, Busquets officially signed a two-and-a-half-year deal with Inter Miami. He was also joined at the club with former Barcelona teammates Messi and Jordi Alba, and later followed by Luis Suárez at the end of 2023. He won his first title with the club on 20 August 2023, helping Inter Miami beat Nashville SC in the 2023 Leagues Cup final. On 7 March, Busquets and Inter Miami made their debuts in the CONCACAF Champions Cup against Nashville SC. He would assist in Luis Suárez's stoppage time equalizing goal, helping the first leg end 2–2. On 20 April 2024, Busquets scored his only goal for the club in a 3–1 win over Nashville SC.

On 25 September 2025, Busquets announced that he would be retiring from football at the end of the MLS season. With Inter Miami reaching the 2025 MLS Cup championship game, Busquets made his final professional appearance on 6 December in a 3–1 victory over Vancouver Whitecaps FC; his teammate and former Barcelona colleague Jordi Alba also retired following the match.

== International career ==
=== Youth ===
On 11 October 2008, Busquets earned his first cap for Spain's under-21 in their 2009 UEFA European Under-21 Championship qualification play-offs first-leg away match against Switzerland. He scored in the 17th minute of a 1–2 loss, though they eventually emerged victorious 4–3 on aggregate. On 28 December, he played his first game for the Catalan representative side, starting in a 2–1 victory against Colombia at the Camp Nou.

=== Senior ===
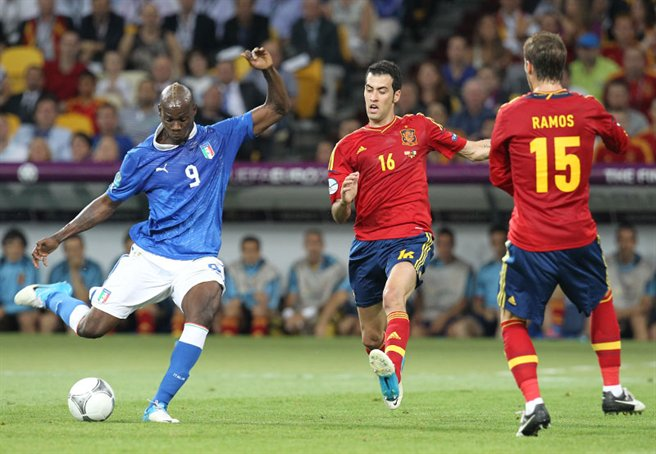
Busquets (center) playing for Spain against Italy in Euro 2012 final

On 11 February 2009, Busquets was called up to the senior squad for a friendly match against England. He was a substitute for a 2010 FIFA World Cup qualifier against Turkey on 28 March 2009, making his debut in the return match on 1 April, playing 16 minutes in a 2–1 win in Istanbul after replacing David Silva. In the summer, he went to his first senior tournament, helping Spain come third at the 2009 FIFA Confederations Cup in South Africa.

"If I were a player, I would like to be like Busquets."

— Vicente del Bosque, June 2010

Busquets was selected by manager Vicente del Bosque for the 2010 FIFA World Cup in the same country, assuming the holding midfielder role naturalized Brazilian Marcos Senna had previously occupied in the conquest of UEFA Euro 2008. He played all of the tournament's games and minutes for the eventual world champions, save the last 30 minutes of the 0–1 group-stage loss against Switzerland in Durban. He finished the tournament with the third–highest pass success rate, alongside his teammate Puyol, completing 88% of his passes.

=== UEFA Euro 2012 and 100th appearance ===
At UEFA Euro 2012 in Poland and Ukraine, Busquets played every minute as Spain won the title, and he was named in the Team of the Tournament. On 8 September 2014, he scored his first international goal in a 5–1 victory against Macedonia in the UEFA Euro 2016 qualifying. His second came during the same tournament on 15 November, in the 3–0 defeat of Belarus in Huelva. He was selected for the final tournament in France.

On 9 October 2017, Busquets earned his 100th appearance for Spain in a 1–0 away victory against Israel for the 2018 World Cup qualifiers. Subsequently, he was named in Julen Lopetegui's squad for the final tournament in Russia.

=== Captaincy ===
On 7 October 2020, Busquets was named captain of the Spanish football team for the first time in a goalless friendly draw away against Portugal, as Sergio Ramos was on the bench. The following May, he was included in Luis Enrique's 24-man squad for UEFA Euro 2020. In the absence of Ramos, he was named captain. He tested positive for COVID-19 eight days before Spain's first match, causing the entire squad to withdraw from their final warm-up match against Lithuania. He missed the first two group games – both draws – before returning to the team for the third, in which he was voted man of the match by UEFA for a 5–0 victory against Slovakia. Four days later, in their round of 16 match against Croatia, Busquets was again named the man of the match in his team's 5–3 extra time victory. In the quarter-finals, he hit the post with Spain's first kick of the penalty shootout against Switzerland, though his team prevailed.

In the UEFA Nations League final against France on 10 October 2021, Busquets set-up Mikel Oyarzabal who scored the opening goal of the match, although Spain eventually suffered a 2–1 defeat. For his performances throughout the 2021 UEFA Nations League Finals, Busquets won the Hisense Player of the Finals award.

=== 2022 FIFA World Cup and retirement ===
At the 2022 FIFA World Cup, Busquets captained the national team during the tournament in Qatar. In the round of 16, he missed a penalty during the penalty shootout against Morocco, which ended in a 3–0 defeat after a goalless draw.

On 16 December 2022, Busquets announced his retirement from international football, having made 143 appearances over a fourteen-year senior career.

== Style of play ==
"He's one of the greatest talents that has been given to Spanish football. This is a discovery. The first time I saw Busquets playing, I called a friend and said: ‘I saw a player from an extinct species’. He's a star."

— César Luis Menotti, July 2011

Considered by several pundits to be one of the best midfielders of his generation, and one of the greatest holding midfielders of all time, Busquets was usually deployed as either a central or defensive midfielder, although he was also capable of playing as a central defender. Busquets was known for redefining the deep-lying midfield position by focusing on football intelligence, precision passing, and a ‘genius’ ability to read the game rather than overwhelming strength or physicality. A hard-working player, he excelled at intercepting loose balls and breaking down opposition plays due to his positional sense, defensive attributes, tackling, tactical intelligence, and ability to read the game, despite his lack of pace. Due to his vision, ball control, physical prowess, technical skills, calm composure on the ball, and accurate passing ability, he rarely relinquished possession, and alongside his former Barcelona midfield teammates, such as Iniesta, Xavi and Ivan Rakitić, he also played an important creative role in setting his team's tempo in midfield as a deep-lying playmaker through his short passing game. His role was also likened to that of a metodista ("centre-half", in Italian football jargon), due to his ability to dictate play in midfield as well as assist his team defensively. His position and playing style led him to be compared to his former manager, as well as fellow former Spain and Barcelona player, Pep Guardiola.

Manager Vicente del Bosque praised Busquets, saying: "If you watch the whole game, you won't see Busquets—but watch Busquets, and you will see the whole game." The latter's height also allowed him to be effective in the air, and enabled him to advance into more offensive positions on occasion, providing an additional attacking outlet for his team. Busquets had been accused of play-acting in the past, due to his tendency of exaggerating fouls. However, in response to these criticisms, he defended his behavior as intelligent, arguing that the realities of the game were more complex.

Often considered to be one of the most underrated footballers in the world, Busquets earned praise from his peers, with former teammate Lionel Messi saying "When there will be trouble, Busquets will always be there."

== Personal life ==
Busquets' father, Carles, was also a footballer. He played as a goalkeeper for Barcelona for several years during the 1990s, although almost exclusively as a backup.

In 2014, Busquets started a relationship with Elena Galera. They have three sons, Enzo, Levi and Romeo. He has an Arabic tattoo on his left forearm translating to "A thing for you, the life in my country", dedicated to his maternal grandfather to whom he was very close.

== Coaching career ==
On 17 August 2026, Busquets became assistant to Juliano Belletti at Barcelona Atlètic, while taking the coaching course.

== Career statistics ==
=== Club ===
Appearances and goals by club, season and competition
Club	Season	League			National cup (Note: Includes Copa del Rey, U.S. Open Cup)		Continental		Other		Total	
Club	Season	Division	Apps	Goals	Apps	Goals	Apps	Goals	Apps	Goals	Apps	Goals
Barcelona B	2007–08	Tercera División	23	2	—		—		—		23	2
Barcelona B	2008–09	Segunda División B	2	0	—		—		—		2	0
Barcelona B	Total		25	2	—		—		—		25	2
Barcelona	2008–09	La Liga	24	1	9	0	8 (Note: Appearances in UEFA Champions League)	2	—		41	3
Barcelona	2009–10	La Liga	33	0	4	0	10	0	5 (Note: One appearance in UEFA Super Cup, two appearances in Supercopa de España, two appearances and one goal in FIFA Club World Cup)	1	52	1
Barcelona	2010–11	La Liga	28	1	5	0	12	0	1 (Note: Appearance(s) in Supercopa de España)	0	46	1
Barcelona	2011–12	La Liga	31	1	8	0	10	1	3 (Note: One appearance in UEFA Super Cup, one appearance in Supercopa de España, one appearance in FIFA Club World Cup)	0	52	2
Barcelona	2012–13	La Liga	31	1	4	0	8	0	2	0	45	1
Barcelona	2013–14	La Liga	32	1	5	1	9	1	2	0	48	3
Barcelona	2014–15	La Liga	33	1	4	0	10	0	—		47	1
Barcelona	2015–16	La Liga	35	0	5	0	9	0	4 (Note: One appearance in UEFA Super Cup, one appearance in Supercopa de España, two appearances in FIFA Club World Cup)	0	53	0
Barcelona	2016–17	La Liga	33	0	5	0	8	0	2	0	48	0
Barcelona	2017–18	La Liga	31	1	7	0	10	0	2	0	50	1
Barcelona	2018–19	La Liga	35	0	6	0	12	0	1	0	54	0
Barcelona	2019–20	La Liga	33	2	2	0	7	0	1	0	43	2
Barcelona	2020–21	La Liga	36	0	6	0	6	0	2	0	50	0
Barcelona	2021–22	La Liga	36	2	2	0	12 (Note: Six appearances in UEFA Champions League, six appearances and one goal in UEFA Europa League)	1	1	0	51	3
Barcelona	2022–23	La Liga	30	0	5	0	5 (Note: Four appearances in UEFA Champions League, one appearance in UEFA Europa League)	0	2	0	42	0
Barcelona	Total		481	11	77	1	136	5	28	1	722	18
Inter Miami	2023	MLS	11	0	2	0	—		7 (Note: Appearances in Leagues Cup)	0	20	0
Inter Miami	2024	MLS	30	1	—		4 (Note: Appearances in CONCACAF Champions Cup)	0	6 (Note: Four appearances in Leagues Cup, two appearances in MLS Cup playoffs)	0	40	1
Inter Miami	2025	MLS	33	0	—		7	0	16 (Note: Four appearances in FIFA Club World Cup, six appearances in Leagues Cup, six appearances in MLS Cup playoffs)	0	56	0
Inter Miami	Total		74	1	2	0	11	0	29	0	116	1
Career total			580	14	79	1	147	5	57	1	863	21

=== International ===
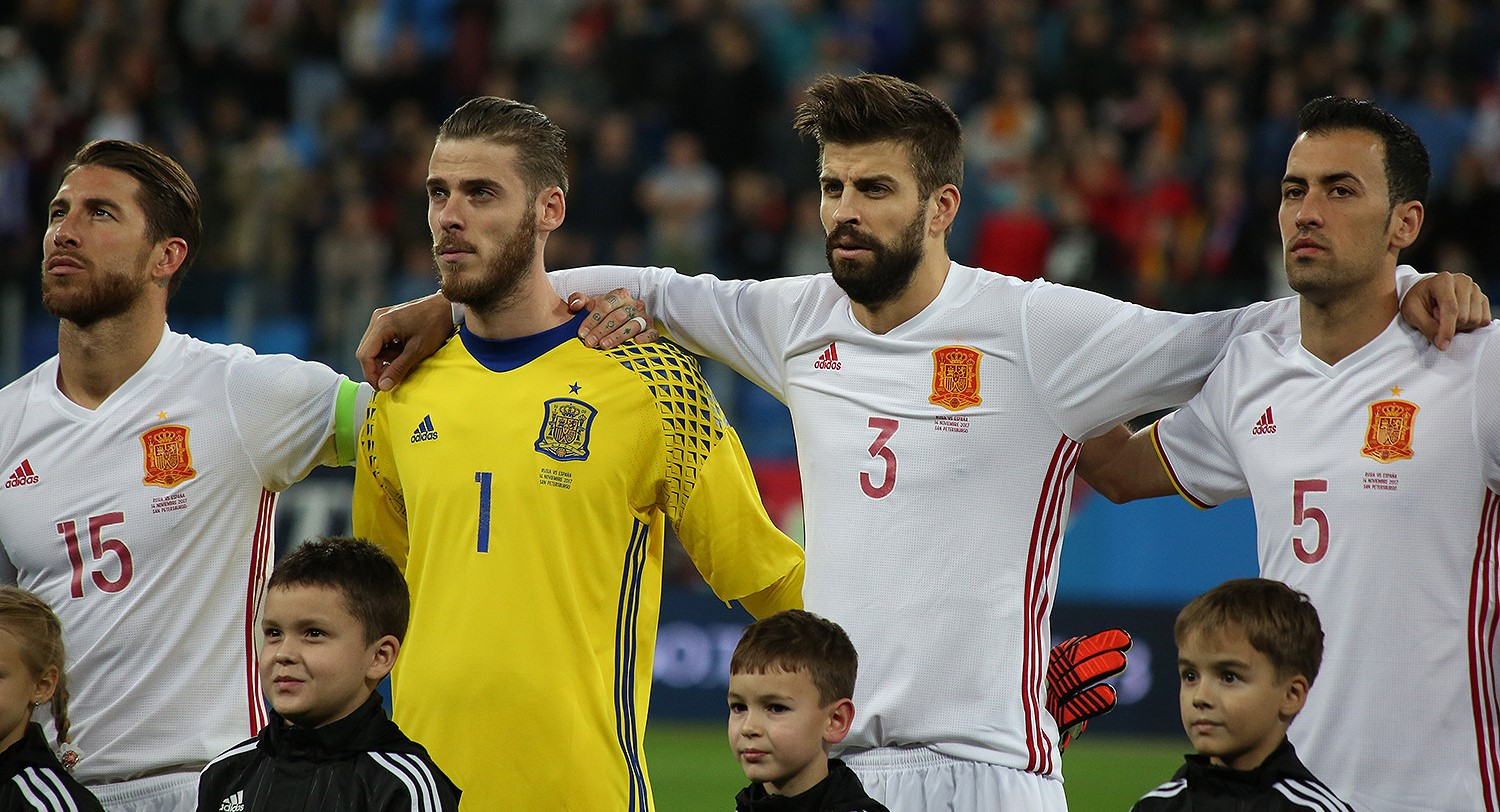
Busquets (furthest right) lining up for Spain in 2017

Appearances and goals by national team and year
National team	Year	Apps	Goals
Spain	2009	10	0
Spain	2010	16	0
Spain	2011	11	0
Spain	2012	14	0
Spain	2013	12	0
Spain	2014	11	2
Spain	2015	8	0
Spain	2016	12	0
Spain	2017	8	0
Spain	2018	9	0
Spain	2019	5	0
Spain	2020	4	0
Spain	2021	13	0
Spain	2022	10	0
Total		143	2

Scores and results list Spain's goal tally first, score column indicates score after each Busquets goal

List of international goals scored by Sergio Busquets
No.	Date	Venue	Cap	Opponent	Score	Result	Competition
1	8 September 2014	Ciutat de València, Valencia, Spain	70	Macedonia	3–1	5–1	UEFA Euro 2016 qualifying
2	15 November 2014	Nuevo Colombino, Huelva, Spain	73	Belarus	2–0	3–0	UEFA Euro 2016 qualifying

== Honours ==
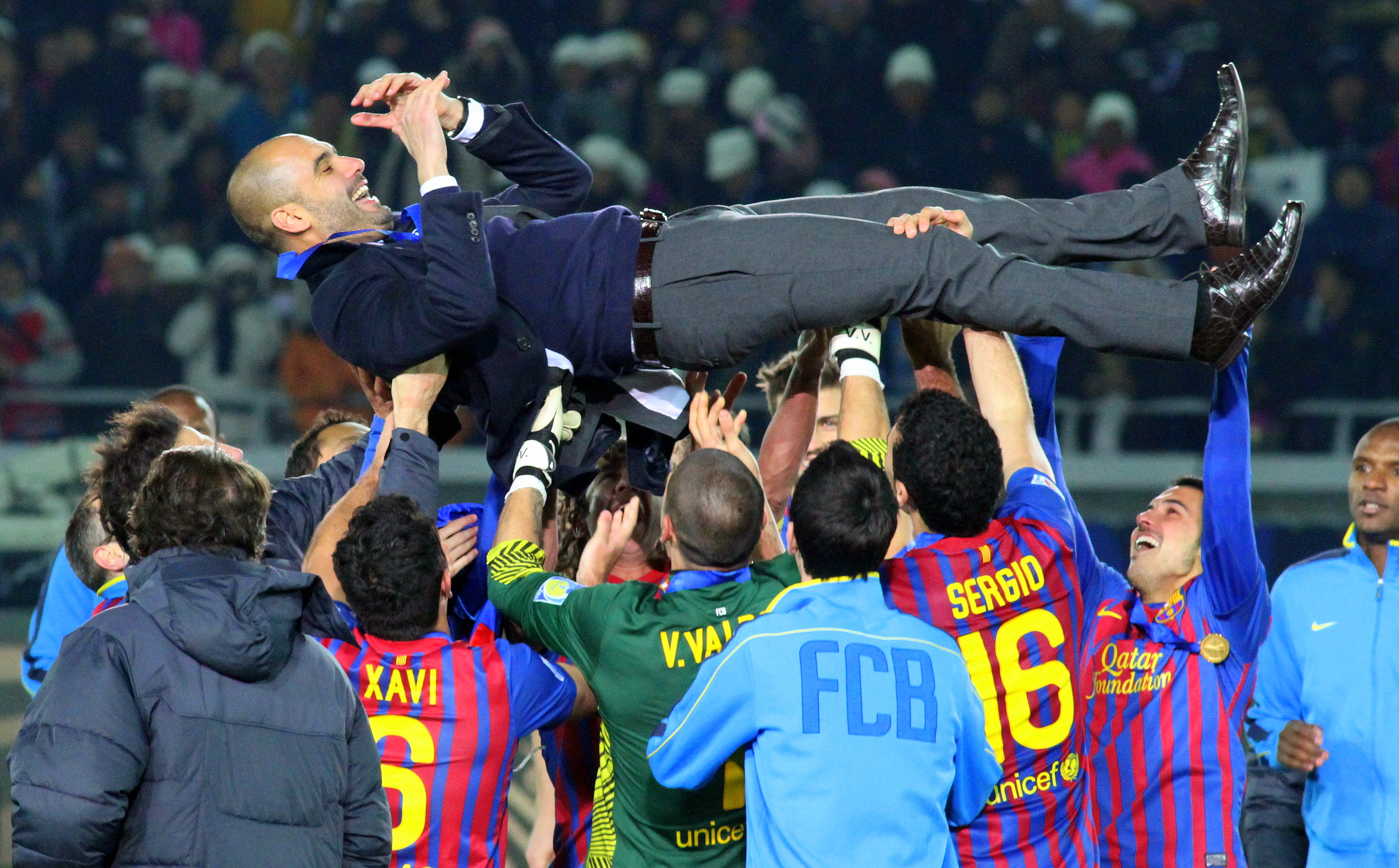
Busquets (wearing No. 16) helps his Barcelona teammates hoist manager Pep Guardiola after they won the 2011 FIFA Club World Cup.

Barcelona

- La Liga: 2008–09, 2009–10, 2010–11, 2012–13, 2014–15, 2015–16, 2017–18, 2018–19, 2022–23
- Copa del Rey: 2008–09, 2011–12, 2014–15, 2015–16, 2016–17, 2017–18, 2020–21
- Supercopa de España: 2009, 2010, 2011, 2013, 2016, 2018, 2023
- UEFA Champions League: 2008–09, 2010–11, 2014–15
- UEFA Super Cup: 2009, 2011, 2015
- FIFA Club World Cup: 2009, 2011, 2015

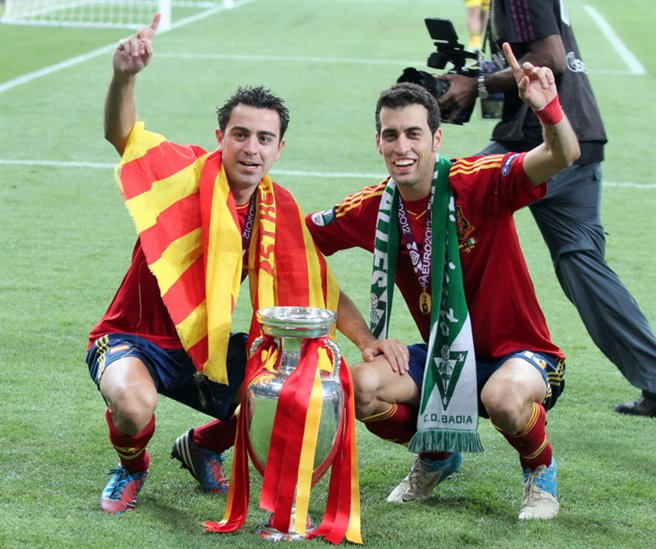
Xavi and Busquets with the Henri Delaunay Trophy after Spain won Euro 2012

Inter Miami

- MLS Cup: 2025
- Eastern Conference (MLS): 2025
- Supporters' Shield: 2024
- Leagues Cup: 2023

Spain

- FIFA World Cup: 2010
- UEFA European Championship: 2012
- FIFA Confederations Cup runner-up: 2013; third place: 2009
- UEFA Nations League runner-up: 2020–21

Individual

- Bravo Award: 2009
- La Liga's Breakthrough Player: 2009
- FIFA World Cup All-Star Team: 2010
- UEFA European Championship Team of the Tournament: 2012
- UEFA Champions League Squad of the Season: 2014–15
- La Liga Team of the Season: 2015–16
- UEFA La Liga Team of the Season: 2015–16
- UEFA Nations League Finals Player of the Tournament: 2021
- MLS All-Star: 2024

Decorations

- Prince of Asturias Awards: 2010
- Gold Medal of the Royal Order of Sporting Merit: 2011

== See also ==
- List of men's footballers with 1,000 or more official appearances
- List of footballers with 100 or more UEFA Champions League appearances
- List of men's footballers with 100 or more international caps
- List of FC Barcelona players (100+ appearances)
- List of La Liga players (400+ appearances)
- List of footballers with 400 or more La Liga appearances

== Notes ==
Sporting positions
Preceded by Lionel Messi	FC Barcelona captain 2021–2023	Succeeded by Sergi Roberto
