= 2013 Supercopa de España =

Atlético Madrid	Barcelona
1	1
- 1–1 on aggregate. Barcelona won on away goals.

First leg
Atlético Madrid	Barcelona
1	1
- Date: 21 August 2013
- Venue: Vicente Calderón, Madrid
- Referee: Alberto Undiano Mallenco
- Attendance: 54,851

Second leg
Barcelona	Atlético Madrid
0	0
- Date: 28 August 2013
- Venue: Camp Nou, Barcelona
- Referee: David Fernández Borbalán
- Attendance: 74,536

The 2013 Supercopa de España was a two-legged Spanish football match-up that was played in August 2013 between the champions of 2012–13 La Liga, Barcelona, and the winner of the 2012–13 Copa del Rey, Atlético Madrid.

In the first leg which was played on 21 August in Madrid, former Barcelona striker David Villa put Atlético Madrid ahead when he hit a right-footed volley into the back of the net after a cross from the left after 12 minutes. Barcelona equalized in the 66th minute when substitute Neymar headed in at the far post after a high cross by Dani Alves from the right.

In the second leg, played on 28 August at the Camp Nou, Lionel Messi missed a penalty for Barcelona in the 89th minute, hitting his shot against the crossbar after Miranda had bundled substitute Pedro over in the area. Atlético Madrid had two players sent off: Filipe Luís in the 81st minute for tangling with Dani Alves, and Arda Turan, who had already been substituted, in the first minute of added time for protesting a decision. Barcelona won the cup for a record-extending 11th time on the away goals rule.

== Match details ==
=== First leg ===
21 August 2013
23:00 CEST

Atlético Madrid	1–1	Barcelona
Villa 12'	Report	Neymar 66'

Vicente Calderón, Madrid
Attendance: 54,851
Referee: Alberto Undiano Mallenco (Navarre)

Atlético Madrid	Barcelona

GK	13	(Belgium) Thibaut Courtois
RB	20	(Spain) Juanfran	(yellow card) 36'
CB	23	(Brazil) Miranda
CB	2	(Uruguay) Diego Godín
LB	3	(Brazil) Filipe Luís	(yellow card) 39'
CM	14	(Spain) Gabi (c)
CM	4	(Spain) Mario Suárez	(yellow card) 56'
RW	6	(Spain) Koke		(substituted off) 73'
AM	19	(Spain) Diego Costa		(substituted off) 79'
LW	10	(Turkey) Arda Turan		(substituted off) 76'
CF	9	(Spain) David Villa
Substitutes:
GK	1	(Spain) Dani Aranzubia
DF	22	(Argentina) Emiliano Insúa
DF	24	(Argentina) Martín Demichelis
MF	5	(Portugal) Tiago
MF	11	(Uruguay) Cristian Rodríguez		(substituted on) 79'
MF	27	(Spain) Óliver		(substituted on) 73'
FW	21	(Brazil) Léo Baptistão		(substituted on) 76'
Manager:
(Argentina) Diego Simeone

GK	1	(Spain) Víctor Valdés
RB	22	(Brazil) Dani Alves
CB	3	(Spain) Gerard Piqué
CB	14	(Argentina) Javier Mascherano
LB	18	(Spain) Jordi Alba	(yellow card) 60'
DM	16	(Spain) Sergio Busquets	(yellow card) 43'
CM	6	(Spain) Xavi (c)		(substituted off) 89'
CM	8	(Spain) Andrés Iniesta
RW	9	(Chile) Alexis Sánchez
LW	7	(Spain) Pedro		(substituted off) 59'
CF	10	(Argentina) Lionel Messi		(substituted off) 46'
Substitutes:
GK	13	(Spain) José Manuel Pinto
DF	2	(Spain) Martín Montoya
MF	4	(Spain) Cesc Fàbregas		(substituted on) 46'
MF	12	(Mexico) Jonathan dos Santos
MF	17	(Cameroon) Alex Song		(substituted on) 89'
FW	11	(Brazil) Neymar	(yellow card) 86'	(substituted on) 59'
FW	20	(Spain) Cristian Tello
Manager:
(Argentina) Gerardo Martino

=== Second leg ===
28 August 2013
23:00 CEST

Barcelona	0–0	Atlético Madrid
	Report

Camp Nou, Barcelona
Attendance: 74,536
Referee: David Fernández Borbalán (Andalusia)

Barcelona	Atlético Madrid

GK	1	(Spain) Víctor Valdés
RB	22	(Brazil) Dani Alves
CB	3	(Spain) Gerard Piqué	(yellow card) 54'
CB	14	(Argentina) Javier Mascherano
LB	18	(Spain) Jordi Alba
DM	16	(Spain) Sergio Busquets	(yellow card) 30'
CM	6	(Spain) Xavi (c)
CM	4	(Spain) Cesc Fàbregas	(yellow card) 28'	(substituted off) 73'
RW	9	(Chile) Alexis Sánchez		(substituted off) 65'
LW	11	(Brazil) Neymar
CF	10	(Argentina) Lionel Messi
Substitutes:
GK	13	(Spain) José Manuel Pinto
DF	2	(Spain) Martín Montoya
DF	15	(Spain) Marc Bartra
MF	8	(Spain) Andrés Iniesta		(substituted on) 73'
MF	17	(Cameroon) Alex Song
FW	7	(Spain) Pedro		(substituted on) 65'
FW	20	(Spain) Cristian Tello
Manager:
(Argentina) Gerardo Martino

GK	13	(Belgium) Thibaut Courtois
RB	20	(Spain) Juanfran
CB	2	(Uruguay) Diego Godín	(yellow card) 88'
CB	23	(Brazil) Miranda
LB	3	(Brazil) Filipe Luís	(red card) 81'
CM	4	(Spain) Mario Suárez
CM	14	(Spain) Gabi (c)	(yellow card) 81'
RW	6	(Spain) Koke	(yellow card) 26'	(substituted off) 89'
LW	10	(Turkey) Arda Turan	(red card) 90+1'	(substituted off) 72'
AM	19	(Brazil) Diego Costa	(yellow card) 85'
CF	9	(Spain) David Villa		(substituted off) 84'
Substitutes:
GK	1	(Spain) Dani Aranzubia
DF	24	(Argentina) Martín Demichelis
MF	5	(Portugal) Tiago
MF	8	(Spain) Raúl García
MF	11	(Uruguay) Cristian Rodríguez		(substituted on) 84'
FW	7	(Spain) Adrián		(substituted on) 72'
FW	21	(Brazil) Léo Baptistão		(substituted on) 89'
Manager:
(Argentina) Diego Simeone

== See also ==
- 2013–14 La Liga
- 2013–14 Copa del Rey
- 2013–14 Atlético Madrid season
- 2013–14 FC Barcelona season
