= Ferrán Monzó =

Spanish footballer

Personal information
- Full name: Ferrán Monzó Giménez
- Date of birth: 6 December 1992 (age 33)
- Place of birth: L'Alcúdia, Spain
- Height: 1.93 m (6 ft 4 in)
- Position: Centre back

Team information
- Current team: UD Alzira

Youth career
- Paiporta
- 2008–2009: Torrent
- 2009–2010: Levante

Senior career*
Years	Team	Apps	(Gls)
2010–2011	Torrellano Illice	16	(0)
2011–2012	Jove Español	28	(1)
2012–2014	Espanyol B	58	(3)
2014–2015	Doxa	24	(0)
2015	Rapid București	6	(0)
2016	Getafe B	15	(0)
2016	Târgu Mureș	0	(0)
2016–2017	Alzira	1	(0)
2017–	Dénia		
- * Club domestic league appearances and goals as of 20 August 2016

Ferrán Monzó Giménez (born 6 December 1992) is a Spanish footballer who plays for CD Dénia as a central defender.

== Club career ==
Born in L'Alcúdia, Valencian Community, Monzó played amateur football until 2012 when he joined RCD Espanyol. He was assigned to the B-team, going on to spend two full seasons in Segunda División B with the side.

On 30 May 2014, Monzó was released, signing two months later with Doxa Katokopias F.C. of Cyprus. On 13 August 2015, he joined Romanian club FC Rapid București on a one-year contract.
