= José Manuel Pinto =

Spanish footballer (born 1975)

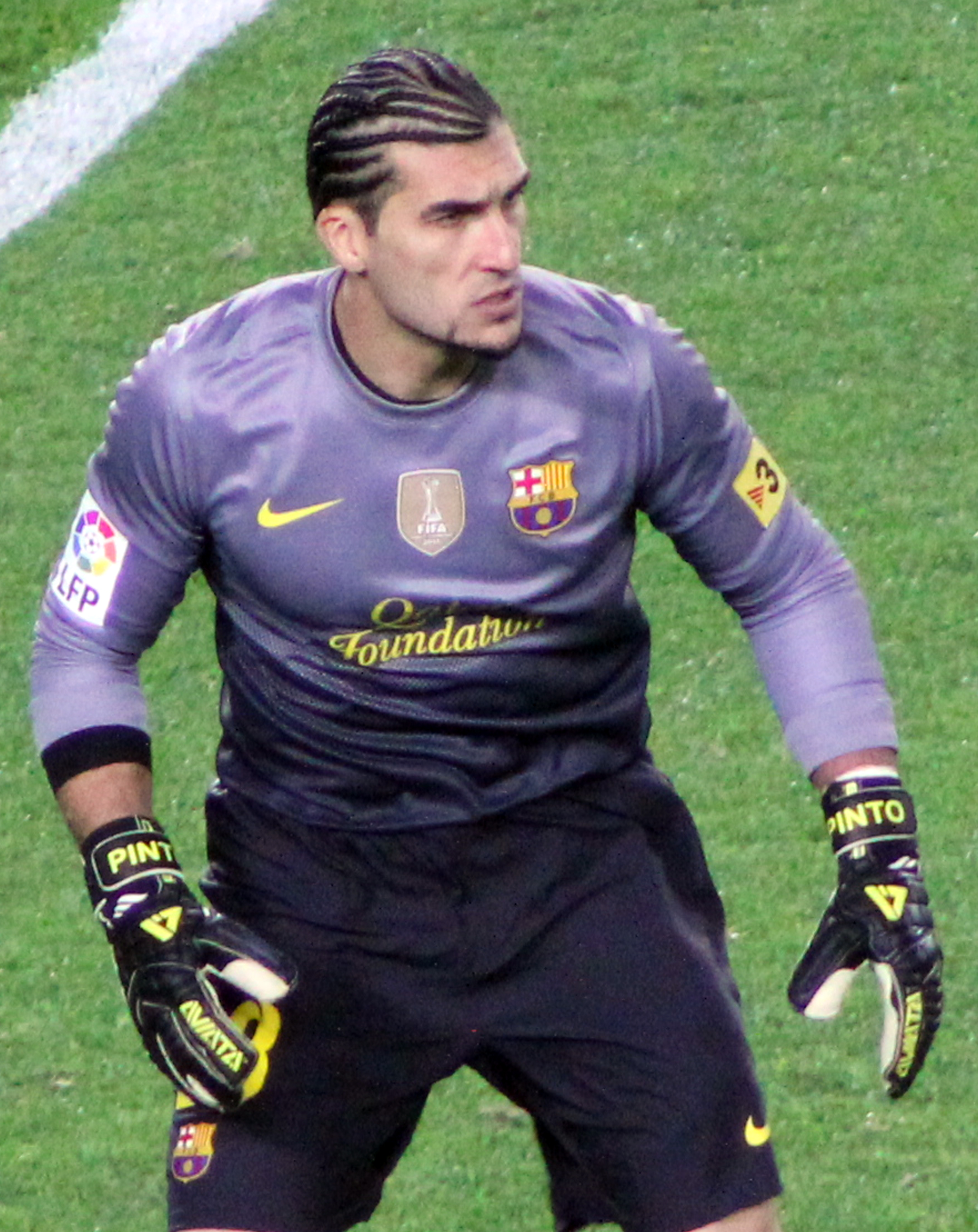
- Pinto with Barcelona in 2012

Personal information
- Full name: José Manuel Pinto Colorado
- Date of birth: 8 November 1975 (age 50)
- Place of birth: El Puerto de Santa María, Spain
- Height: 1.85 m (6 ft 1 in)
- Position: Goalkeeper

Youth career
- 1992–1994: Safa San Luis

Senior career*
Years	Team	Apps	(Gls)
1994–1998	Betis B	82	(0)
1998	Betis	1	(0)
1998–2008	Celta	181	(0)
2008	→ Barcelona (loan)	3	(0)
2008–2014	Barcelona	31	(0)
Total		298	(0)
- * Club domestic league appearances and goals

José Manuel Pinto Colorado (born 8 November 1975) is a Spanish former professional footballer who played as a goalkeeper.

After making a name for himself at Celta, with which he made his La Liga debut, he signed for Barcelona in 2008, going on to act as backup for Víctor Valdés for the vast majority of his spell and being part of squads that won numerous titles, including three national championships and two Champions Leagues.

Pinto appeared in 160 top-flight games over 16 seasons, also representing Real Betis.

== Club career ==
=== Betis and Celta ===
Born in El Puerto de Santa María, Province of Cádiz, Andalusia, Pinto was a product of Real Betis' youth system. He made his La Liga debut for the club's first team in the 1997–98 campaign (one game as a second-half substitute against Racing de Santander).

Unable to dislodge Toni Prats, Pinto joined Celta de Vigo a year later. He went on to win the Ricardo Zamora Trophy for the 2005–06 season after allowing just 29 goals in 37 appearances, a goals per match ratio of 0.78. He was also eventually awarded the captain's armband, totalling 125 games in the top division and 56 in the Segunda División as well as competing in the UEFA Champions League (in 2003–04, although backing up Pablo Cavallero in the domestic league, he would appear in five group-stage matches as Celta progressed to the round of 16) and the UEFA Cup.

=== Barcelona ===
Pinto signed on loan for Barcelona on 18 January 2008, with the player arriving as cover for the injured Albert Jorquera after the latter damaged knee ligaments during the festive break. He made his debut on 26 April, in a 2–0 away loss to Deportivo de La Coruña. His second match also ended in defeat, as Mallorca came up from behind 2–0 to win 3–2 at the Camp Nou.

On 30 May 2008, Barcelona signed Pinto on a permanent deal for two years and €500,000. In his first full season he was first-choice in the Copa del Rey which was won, including the final with Athletic Bilbao.

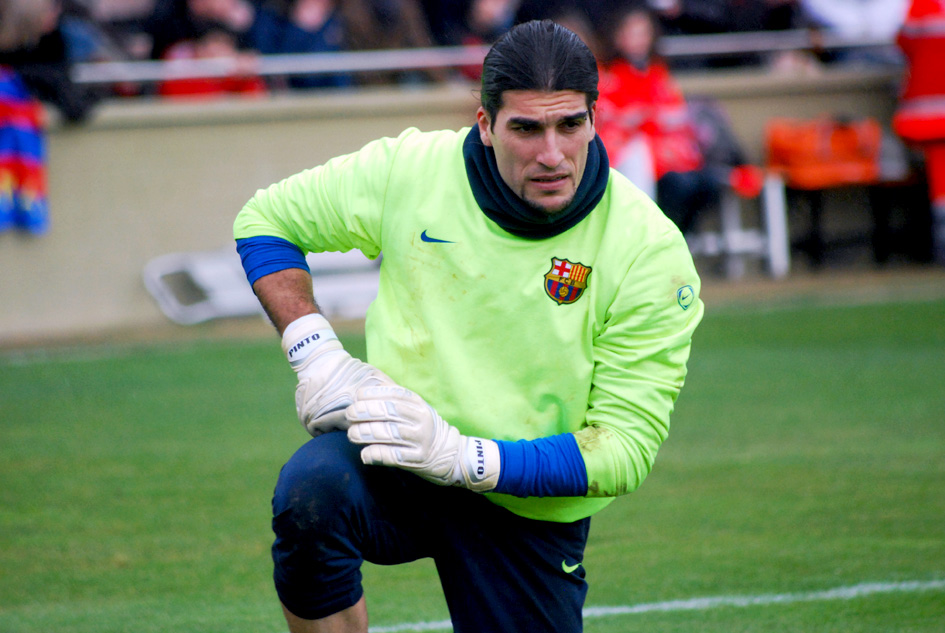
Pinto warming up for Barcelona in February 2010

On 22 October 2010, UEFA opened a disciplinary case, charging Pinto with "improper conduct" following his actions in a Champions League group stage match against Copenhagen two days earlier. Allegedly, he whistled to fool opponent player César Santin – who was running through on goal in the 26th minute – into thinking he was offside, leading him to stop, believing that the referee, Stéphane Lannoy, had blown his whistle; the referee allowed the play to continue and did not show Pinto a yellow card for the alleged deception. Following the game, Barcelona strongly distanced itself from their player's conduct. The incident was captured on video, showing the goalkeeper apparently whistling and then gloating over the incident; after the investigation was concluded, he was suspended for two games.

Pinto made his first league appearance for the Catalans in more than two years on 20 February 2011 (due to a knee injury to Víctor Valdés), in a 2–1 home win over Athletic Bilbao where he notably saved a Fernando Llorente header. Again, he started in the domestic cup campaign, including the final against Real Madrid, a 1–0 extra-time loss. The following week, against the same team but in the Champions League semi-finals' first leg, he was sent off by referee Wolfgang Stark after a half-time altercation involving himself (he was on the bench), Álvaro Arbeloa and Real Madrid match delegate Chendo, in a 2–0 away win.

In 2011–12, Pinto was once again the starting goalkeeper in the Spanish Cup campaign, with Barcelona again reaching the decisive match and again defeating Athletic Bilbao (3–0). His first league appearance only came on 29 April 2012, in a 7–0 away rout of Rayo Vallecano.

On 11 February 2013, after having agreed to it the previous December, the 37-year-old Pinto renewed his contract with the Blaugrana, due to expire in June, for a further season. In May 2014, he left as a free agent.

== Personal life ==
Still as an active footballer, Pinto started working as a musician and a record producer, mainly in hip hop. In 2000 he founded his own label, Wahin Makinaciones, which was also the name of his first release six years later; his musical alter ego was Wahin.

== Career statistics ==
Appearances and goals by club, season and competition
Club	Season	League			Cup		Europe		Other		Total	
Club	Season	Division	Apps	Goals	Apps	Goals	Apps	Goals	Apps	Goals	Apps	Goals
Betis B	1994–95	Segunda División B	6	0	—		—		—		6	0
Betis B	1995–96	Segunda División B	19	0	—		—		—		19	0
Betis B	1996–97	Segunda División B	37	0	—		—		—		37	0
Betis B	1997–98	Segunda División B	20	0	—		—		—		20	0
Betis B	Total		82	0	—		—		—		82	0
Betis	1997–98	La Liga	1	0	0	0	0	0	—		1	0
Celta	1998–99	La Liga	1	0	4	0	0	0	—		5	0
Celta	1999–2000	La Liga	19	0	4	0	5	0	—		28	0
Celta	2000–01	La Liga	18	0	4	0	4	0	—		26	0
Celta	2001–02	La Liga	7	0	2	0	3	0	—		12	0
Celta	2002–03	La Liga	3	0	2	0	6	0	—		11	0
Celta	2003–04	La Liga	6	0	4	0	5	0	—		15	0
Celta	2004–05	Segunda División	40	0	0	0	—		—		40	0
Celta	2005–06	La Liga	37	0	0	0	—		—		37	0
Celta	2006–07	La Liga	34	0	0	0	0	0	—		34	0
Celta	2007–08	Segunda División	16	0	0	0	—		—		16	0
Celta	Total		181	0	20	0	23	0	—		224	0
Barcelona (loan)	2007–08	La Liga	3	0	0	0	0	0	—		3	0
Barcelona	2008–09	La Liga	2	0	9	0	0	0	—		11	0
Barcelona	2009–10	La Liga	0	0	4	0	0	0	0	0	4	0
Barcelona	2010–11	La Liga	6	0	9	0	2	0	—		17	0
Barcelona	2011–12	La Liga	3	0	9	0	1	0	0	0	13	0
Barcelona	2012–13	La Liga	7	0	8	0	1	0	0	0	16	0
Barcelona	2013–14	La Liga	13	0	9	0	4	0	0	0	26	0
Barcelona	Barcelona total		34	0	48	0	8	0	0	0	90	0
Career total			298	0	68	0	31	0	0	0	397	0

== Honours ==
Celta

- UEFA Intertoto Cup: 2000

Barcelona

- La Liga: 2008–09, 2010–11, 2012–13
- Copa del Rey: 2008–09, 2011–12
- Supercopa de España: 2009, 2010, 2011, 2013
- UEFA Champions League: 2008–09, 2010–11
- UEFA Super Cup: 2009, 2011
- FIFA Club World Cup: 2009

Individual

- Ricardo Zamora Trophy: 2005–06
