= Martín Montoya =

Spanish footballer (born 1991)

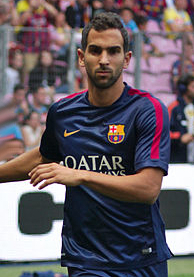
- Montoya with Barcelona in 2014

Personal information
- Full name: Martín Montoya Torralbo
- Date of birth: 14 April 1991 (age 35)
- Place of birth: Gavà, Spain
- Height: 1.75 m (5 ft 9 in)
- Position: Right-back

Youth career
- 1998–1999: Gavà
- 1999–2009: Barcelona

Senior career*
Years	Team	Apps	(Gls)
2009–2012	Barcelona B	74	(0)
2011–2016	Barcelona	45	(1)
2015–2016	→ Inter Milan (loan)	3	(0)
2016	→ Betis (loan)	13	(0)
2016–2018	Valencia	54	(2)
2018–2020	Brighton & Hove Albion	52	(0)
2020–2023	Betis	17	(0)
2023–2025	Aris	53	(0)
Total		311	(3)

International career
2008	Spain U17	8	(0)
2009	Spain U18	3	(0)
2009–2010	Spain U19	9	(0)
2010–2013	Spain U21	22	(1)
2012	Spain U23	5	(0)
2011–2019	Catalonia	6	(0)
Medal record
Men's football
Representing Spain
UEFA European Under-21 Championship
Winner	2013 Israel
Winner	2011 Denmark
UEFA European Under-19 Championship
Runner-up	2010 France
UEFA European Under-17 Championship
Winner	2008 Turkey
- * Club domestic league appearances and goals

Martín Montoya Torralbo (born 14 April 1991) is a Spanish former professional footballer who played as a right-back.

He started his career with Barcelona, making his first appearance for the first team in 2011 and going on to win seven major titles as a backup. In La Liga, he also represented Betis (two spells) and Valencia, totalling 129 matches and three goals over 11 seasons. In addition, he spent two years in the Premier League with Brighton & Hove Albion.

With Spain, Montoya won two European Under-21 Championships.

== Club career ==
=== Barcelona ===
Born in Gavà, Barcelona, Catalonia, Montoya started playing football for his hometown club, moving to Barcelona's youth system, La Masia, at the age of 8. After progressing through its ranks, he was promoted to the B team in 2009.

In the 2009–10 season, Montoya contributed 23 games as the Luis Enrique-led side returned to the Segunda División after an 11-year absence. He made his debut for the main squad on 26 February 2011, coming on as a substitute for Adriano in the last five minutes of a 3–0 away win against Mallorca.

Towards the end of March 2011, rumours surfaced linking Montoya with Valencia, who was willing to pay the €3 million buy-out clause of the player. On 30 April, he made his first start for Barcelona in a 2–1 La Liga loss at Real Sociedad, suffering a broken clavicle in the early minutes of the match and being sidelined for the rest of the campaign.

Montoya again spent the vast majority of 2011–12 with the reserves. His first start for the first team occurred on 12 January 2012, in a 2–1 away victory over Osasuna in the Copa del Rey (6–1 on aggregate). Due to injury to Dani Alves, he played in the final of the domestic cup, featuring the full 90 minutes in a 3–0 defeat of Athletic Bilbao. He had previously scored his first official goal on 6 December 2011, helping the hosts beat BATE Borisov 4–0 in the group stage of the UEFA Champions League.

Montoya scored his second goal as a professional on 1 June 2013, netting the third in a 4–1 home win against Málaga. He finished the season with 24 appearances in all competitions, totalling 1,678 minutes.

Montoya expressed his desire to leave the Camp Nou in December 2014, after the signing of another player for his position, also-Brazilian Douglas. He eventually stayed until the end of the campaign, which ended with a treble, his only major contribution being playing 80 minutes in a 3–1 victory at Paris Saint-Germain in the Champions League quarter-finals.

In July 2015, Montoya joined Inter Milan on a season-long loan for €1.3 million, with the option of extending the deal for another year pending appearances. The Italian club also had an obligation to buy him for €6 million, if he played 33% of all competitive matches during his tenure and each appearance amounted to at least 30 minutes.

On 1 February 2016, still owned by Barcelona, Montoya signed with Real Betis until 30 June.

=== Valencia ===
On 1 August 2016, Montoya signed a four-year deal with Valencia following the expiration of his contract with Barcelona. He played 29 matches and scored twice in his first season, with his team finally ranking in 12th place.

=== Brighton & Hove Albion ===
On 9 August 2018, Montoya signed with English club Brighton & Hove Albion for €7 million, subject to international clearance. He made his debut in the Premier League ten days later, playing 90 minutes in the 3–2 home win over Manchester United. He added four appearances in their run in the FA Cup, including the semi-final loss to Manchester City at Wembley; he played 25 league games during the season, as the team secured their division status for the second time a row.

=== Return to Betis ===
Montoya returned to Spain and Betis on 25 August 2020, after agreeing to a four-year contract. His spell at the Estadio Benito Villamarín was marred by injury problems.

On 8 August 2023, Montoya left by mutual consent.

=== Aris ===
The same day he left Betis, Montoya signed for Super League Greece club Aris Thessaloniki on a two-year deal. He totalled 64 games during his spell, being sent off in a 2–1 loss at Olympiacos on 11 January 2025.

In March 2026, aged 35, Montoya announced his retirement.

== International career ==
In 2011, Montoya earned his first cap for the Spain under-21 team. He was picked by manager Luis Milla to the squad that competed in that year's UEFA European Championship, and started in all the games as the national side won the tournament in Denmark.

On 25 August 2011, Montoya was selected for the first time to the full side by coach Vicente del Bosque, for fixtures against Chile and Liechtenstein; however, he did not take the field on either match. He then played twice at the 2012 Summer Olympics.

Montoya also represented Catalonia, making his debut in 2011. On his sixth cap, on 25 March 2019, he helped them to a 2–1 friendly win over Venezuela.

== Personal life ==
Montoya lost his mother Rosa María at the age of 17, to breast cancer. He stated that this event helped shape his career as a footballer.

== Career statistics ==
As of match played 25 May 2024

Appearances and goals by club, season and competition
Club	Season	League			National cup (Note: Includes Copa del Rey, Coppa Italia, FA Cup)		Europe		Other		Total	
Club	Season	Division	Apps	Goals	Apps	Goals	Apps	Goals	Apps	Goals	Apps	Goals
Barcelona B	2008–09	Segunda División B	1	0	—		—		—		1	0
Barcelona B	2009–10	Segunda División B	22	0	—		—		1 (Note: Appearance in Segunda División B play-offs)	0	23	0
Barcelona B	2010–11	Segunda División	30	0	—		—		—		30	0
Barcelona B	2011–12	Segunda División	21	0	—		—		—		21	0
Barcelona B	Total		74	0	—		—		1	0	75	0
Barcelona	2010–11	La Liga	2	0	0	0	0	0	0	0	2	0
Barcelona	2011–12	La Liga	7	0	2	0	1 (Note: Appearances in UEFA Champions League)	1	0	0	10	1
Barcelona	2012–13	La Liga	15	1	5	0	3	0	1 (Note: Appearance in Supercopa de España)	0	24	1
Barcelona	2013–14	La Liga	13	0	4	0	2	0	0	0	19	0
Barcelona	2014–15	La Liga	8	0	3	0	1	0	—		12	0
Barcelona	Total		45	1	14	0	7	1	1	0	67	2
Inter Milan (loan)	2015–16	Serie A	3	0	1	0	—		—		4	0
Betis (loan)	2015–16	La Liga	13	0	0	0	—		—		13	0
Valencia	2016–17	La Liga	29	2	2	0	—		—		31	2
Valencia	2017–18	La Liga	25	0	6	0	—		—		31	0
Valencia	Total		54	2	8	0	—		—		62	2
Brighton & Hove Albion	2018–19	Premier League	25	0	4	0	—		—		29	0
Brighton & Hove Albion	2019–20	Premier League	27	0	0	0	—		—		27	0
Brighton & Hove Albion	Total		52	0	4	0	—		—		56	0
Betis	2020–21	La Liga	5	0	3	1	—		—		8	1
Betis	2021–22	La Liga	6	0	0	0	4 (Note: Appearances in UEFA Europa League)	0	—		10	0
Betis	2022–23	La Liga	6	0	0	0	0	0	0	0	6	0
Betis	Total		17	0	3	1	4	0	0	0	24	1
Aris	2023–24	Super League Greece	31	0	6	0	2 (Note: Appearances in UEFA Europa Conference League)	0	—		39	0
Career total			289	3	36	1	13	1	2	0	340	5

== Honours ==
Barcelona B

- Segunda División B play-offs: 2010

Barcelona

- La Liga: 2010–11, 2012–13, 2014–15
- Copa del Rey: 2011–12, 2014–15
- Supercopa de España: 2013
- UEFA Champions League: 2014–15

Spain U19

- UEFA European Under-19 Championship runner-up: 2010

Spain U21

- UEFA European Under-21 Championship: 2011, 2013
