= Jean Marie Dongou =

Cameroonian footballer (born 1995)

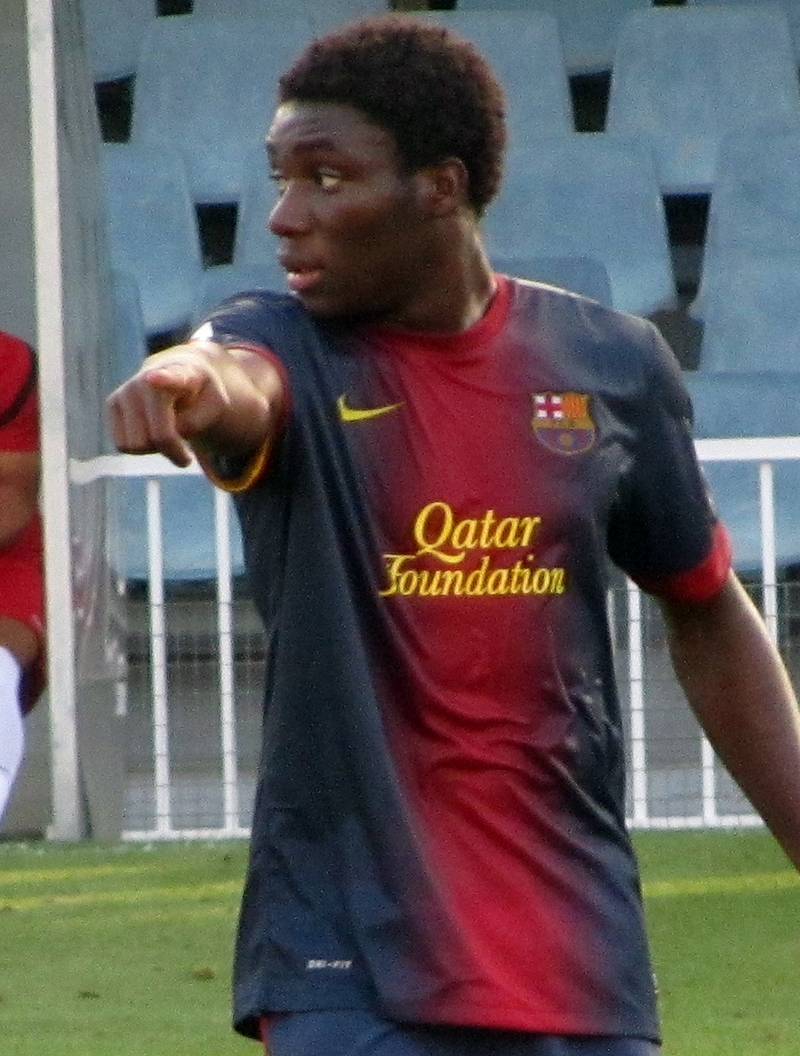
- Dongou with Barcelona B in 2012

Personal information
- Full name: Jean Marie Dongou Tsafack
- Date of birth: 20 April 1995 (age 31)
- Place of birth: Douala, Cameroon
- Height: 1.76 m (5 ft 9 in)
- Position: Forward

Youth career
- Samuel Eto'o Academy
- 2008–2013: Barcelona

Senior career*
Years	Team	Apps	(Gls)
2012–2016	Barcelona B	132	(29)
2013–2014	Barcelona	1	(0)
2016–2017	Zaragoza	31	(7)
2017–2018	Gimnàstic	8	(0)
2018–2019	Lugo	12	(1)
2019	→ Lleida Esportiu (loan)	8	(0)
2020–2021	Honka	26	(10)
2022	Zamora	12	(1)
2022	Anagennisi Karditsa	2	(0)
2023	Osaka	4	(0)

International career
2012	Cameroon U20	4	(2)
- * Club domestic league appearances and goals as of 00:36, 24 March 2026 (UTC)

Jean Marie Dongou Tsafack (born 20 April 1995), known as Dongou, is a Cameroonian professional footballer who played as a forward.

== Club career ==
Born in Douala, Dongou joined FC Barcelona in 2008 at the age of 13, arriving through the Samuel Eto'o Foundation. He made his Segunda División debut for the B team on 28 January 2012 before celebrating his 17th birthday, in a match against SD Huesca where he came on as an 85th-minute substitute for Rodri.

Still in the league competition, and still a junior, Dongou scored his first goal for the Catalans' reserves on 25 March 2012, helping to a 2–1 home defeat of CD Alcoyano. He made his first appearances with the main squad during the 2013 preseason, netting twice in his second in a 7–0 rout of Vålerenga Fotball.

Dongou made his competitive debut with Barcelona on 6 December 2013, replacing Alexis Sánchez for the last 12 minutes of the 4–1 win at FC Cartagena in the round of 32 of the Copa del Rey and closing the score. His first game in the UEFA Champions League came five days later, when he featured nine minutes in a 6–1 rout of Celtic in the group stage. He completed a trio of debuts on 19 January of the following year, again coming from the bench away against Levante UD in the La Liga 1–1 draw.

On 22 January 2016, Dongou signed with division two club Real Zaragoza after agreeing to an 18-month deal. On 23 August of the following year, he joined fellow league team Gimnàstic de Tarragona on a four-year contract.

On 10 July 2018, Dongou moved to second-tier side CD Lugo for two years after cutting ties with Nàstic. The following 30 January, he signed with Segunda División B's Lleida Esportiu on loan until the end of the season with an option to make the move permanent in case of promotion.

Dongou terminated his contract with Lugo on 8 August 2019. In February 2020, he joined FC Honka of the Finnish Veikkausliiga.

On 24 September 2022, following a brief spell in Spain with lowly Zamora CF, Dongou moved to the Super League Greece 2 with Anagennisi Karditsa FC.

In April 2023, Dongou joined FC Osaka of the J3 League. On 17 August 2023, the club announced that his contract had been terminated by mutual agreement. He subsequently retired from professional football at the age of 28. After retiring, he went on to work as a football commentator and analyst for Jijantes TV, covering Barcelona.

== Personal life ==
Dongou is a naturalised citizen of Spain.

== Career statistics ==
As of 8 December 2023

Club	Season	League			National Cup		Continental		Total	
Club	Season	Division	Apps	Goals	Apps	Goals	Apps	Goals	Apps	Goals
Barcelona B	2011–12	Segunda División	12	2	—		—		12	2
Barcelona B	2012–13	Segunda División	32	5	—		—		32	5
Barcelona B	2013–14	Segunda División	30	8	—		—		30	8
Barcelona B	2014–15	Segunda División	39	11	—		—		39	11
Barcelona B	2015–16	Segunda División B	19	3	—		—		19	3
Barcelona B	Total		132	29	0	0	0	0	132	29
Barcelona	2013–14	La Liga	1	0	1	1	1 (Note: Appearance in UEFA Champions League)	0	3	1
Zaragoza	2015–16	Segunda División	17	4	0	0	—		17	4
Zaragoza	2016–17	Segunda División	14	3	0	0	—		14	3
Zaragoza	Total		31	7	0	0	0	0	31	7
Gimnàstic	2017–18	Segunda División	8	0	0	0	—		8	0
Lugo	2018–19	Segunda División	12	1	2	0	—		14	1
Lleida Esportiu	2018–19	Segunda División B	8	0	0	0	—		8	0
Honka	2020	Veikkausliiga	13	7	3	0	1 (Note: Appearance in UEFA Europa League)	0	17	7
Honka	2021	Veikkausliiga	13	3	3	0	4 (Note: Appearances in UEFA Europa Conference League)	3	20	6
Honka	Total		26	10	6	0	5	3	37	13
Zamora	2021–22	Primera División RFEF	12	1	0	0	—		12	1
Anagennisi Karditsa	2022–23	Super League Greece 2	2	0	0	0	—		2	0
Osaka	2023	J.League 3	4	0	0	0	—		4	0
Career total			236	47	9	1	6	3	251	51

== Honours ==
Barcelona

- Copa Catalunya: 2013–14

Individual

- NextGen Series top scorer (shared with Viktor Fischer): 2011–12
