= UD San Mauro =

Association football club in Spain

San Mauro
- Full name: Unión Deportiva San Mauro
- Founded: 20 February 1964; 62 years ago
- Ground: Municipal, Santa Margarida de Montbui, Catalonia, Spain
- Capacity: 1,000
- President: Jordi Segura Moreno
- Manager: Jesus Milán
- League: Lliga Elit
- 2024–25: Lliga Elit, 11th of 16
- Website: udsanmauro.cat
Home colours	Away colours

Unión Deportiva San Mauro (Unió Esportiva Sant Maure in Catalan) is a Spanish football team based in Santa Margarida de Montbui, Barcelona, Catalonia. Founded in 1963, they play in the Lliga Elit, holding home matches at the Camp de Futbol Municipal Santa Margarida de Montbui.

== History ==
After a group of friends started a local team to play for fun in the 1963 winter, San Mauro was officially founded on 20 February 1964. In 2022, the club achieved a first-ever promotion to the Primera Catalana, and despite being moved down to the seventh tier after the creation of Lliga Elit at the end of the season, they reached that category in May 2024.

== Season to season ==
Season	Tier	Division	Place	Copa del Rey
1964–1972	—	Regional	—	
1972–73	6	2ª Reg.	19th	
1973–74	7	3ª Reg.	3rd	
1974–75	7	3ª Reg.	2nd	
1975–76	6	2ª Reg.	13th	
1976–77	6	2ª Reg.	7th	
1977–78	7	2ª Reg.	6th	
1978–79	7	2ª Reg.	2nd	
1979–80	6	1ª Reg.	17th	
1980–81	6	1ª Reg.	11th	
1981–82	6	1ª Reg.	8th	
1982–83	6	1ª Reg.	9th	
1983–84	6	1ª Reg.	12th	
1984–85	6	1ª Reg.	11th	
1985–86	6	1ª Reg.	4th	
1986–87	6	1ª Reg.	8th	
1987–88	6	1ª Reg.	8th	
1988–89	6	1ª Reg.	5th	
1989–90	6	1ª Reg.	2nd	
1990–91	6	1ª Reg.	3rd	

Season	Tier	Division	Place	Copa del Rey
1991–92	6	Pref. Terr.	15th	
1992–93	7	1ª Terr.	1st	
1993–94	6	Pref. Terr.	11th	
1994–95	6	Pref. Terr.	15th	
1995–96	7	1ª Terr.	12th	
1996–97	7	1ª Terr.	5th	
1997–98	7	1ª Terr.	2nd	
1998–99	6	Pref. Terr.	12th	
1999–2000	6	Pref. Terr.	7th	
2000–01	6	Pref. Terr.	10th	
2001–02	6	Pref. Terr.	18th	
2002–03	7	1ª Terr.	7th	
2003–04	7	1ª Terr.	17th	
2004–05	8	2ª Terr.	1st	
2005–06	7	1ª Terr.	7th	
2006–07	7	1ª Terr.	3rd	
2007–08	7	1ª Terr.	5th	
2008–09	7	1ª Terr.	7th	
2009–10	7	1ª Terr.	9th	
2010–11	7	1ª Terr.	4th	

Season	Tier	Division	Place	Copa del Rey
2011–12	6	2ª Cat.	18th	
2012–13	7	3ª Cat.	1st	
2013–14	6	2ª Cat.	9th	
2014–15	6	2ª Cat.	7th	
2015–16	6	2ª Cat.	12th	
2016–17	6	2ª Cat.	15th	
2017–18	7	3ª Cat.	1st	
2018–19	6	2ª Cat.	11th	
2019–20	6	2ª Cat.	18th	
2020–21	6	2ª Cat.	2nd	
2021–22	7	2ª Cat.	1st	
2022–23	6	1ª Cat.	10th	
2023–24	7	1ª Cat.	1st	
2024–25	6	Lliga Elit	11th	
2025–26	6	Lliga Elit	5th	
