= Yeray =

Yeray is a given name. Notable people with the name include:

- Yeray Álvarez, a Spanish footballer
- Yeray Cabanzón, a Spanish footballer
- Yeray González Luis, a Spanish footballer
- Yeray Gómez, a Spanish footballer
- Yeray Luxem, a Belgian athlete
- Yeray Patiño, a Spanish footballer
- Yeray Ruiz, a Spanish motorcycle racer
- Yeray Sabariego, a Spanish footballer
