= 2015–16 Copa Catalunya =

Catalonia Cup

Tournament details
- Country: Catalonia
- Teams: 31

Final positions
- Champions: Sabadell
- Runners-up: Barcelona B

Tournament statistics
- Matches played: 30
- Goals scored: 47 (1.57 per match)

The 2015–16 Copa Catalunya was the 27th staging of the Copa Catalunya. The competition began on 1 and 2 August 2015 and was played by teams in Segunda División, Segunda División B, Tercera División and the top teams of Primera Catalana. Sabadell won the competition by beating Barcelona B in the final.

== Tournament ==
=== First round ===
The first round was drawn on 30 June and was played on 31 July, 1 and 2 August.

- Bye: Reus

31 July 2015	Vilafranca	2 – 1	Gimnàstic	Vilafranca del Penedès
20:30	Sergi Moreno 84'; Bueno 89'		Marc Martínez 20'	Stadium: Municipal; Referee: Raul Calle Martínez

1 August 2015	Santfeliuenc	1 – 3	Cornellà	Sant Feliu de Llobregat
19:00	Éric Pacheco 42'		Enric Gallego 20', 80'; David 38'	Stadium: Les Grasses; Referee: Castellet Julià

1 August 2015	Europa	1 – 0	Espanyol B	Barcelona
19:00				Stadium: Nou Sardenya

1 August 2015	Júpiter	1 – 1 (4–3 p)	Martinenc	Barcelona
19:00				Stadium: La Verneda

1 August 2015	Masnou	0 – 0 (2–4 p)	Palamós	El Masnou
19:00				Stadium: Municipal

1 August 2015	Montañesa	1 – 2	Sant Andreu	Barcelona
19:30				Stadium: Nou Barris

1 August 2015	Peralada	0 – 0 (3–5 p)	Figueres	Peralada
20:00				Stadium: Municipal

1 August 2015	Ascó	1 – 1 (2–4 p)	Lleida Esportiu	Ascó
20:00				Stadium: Municipal

1 August 2015	Manlleu	0 – 1	Olot	Manlleu
20:30				Stadium: Municipal

2 August 2015	Gavà	0 – 1	Castelldefels	Gavà
19:00				Stadium: La Bòbila

2 August 2015	Terrassa	0 – 1	Rubí	Terrassa
19:00				Stadium: Olímpic

2 August 2015	Cerdanyola	1 – 0	Badalona	Cerdanyola del Vallès
19:00				Stadium: Les Fontetes

2 August 2015	Prat	2 – 0	L'Hospitalet	El Prat de Llobregat
20:00				Stadium: Sagnier

=== Second round ===
The second round was drawn on 30 June and was played on 8, 9 and 11 August.

8 August 2015	Castelldefels	1 – 2	Vilafranca	Castelldefels
19:30				Stadium: Els Canyars

8 August 2015	Prat	0 – 0 (4–5 p)	Cornellà	El Prat de Llobregat
20:00				Stadium: Sagnier

8 August 2015	Figueres	1 – 0	Olot	Figueres
20:00				Stadium: Vilatenim

9 August 2015	Cerdanyola	0 – 0 (5–4 p)	Palamós	Cerdanyola del Vallès
19:30				Stadium: Les Fontetes

9 August 2015	Reus	2 – 1	Lleida Esportiu	Reus
20:00				Stadium: Camp Nou

11 August 2015	Júpiter	0 – 2	Europa	Barcelona
19:00				Stadium: La Verneda

11 August 2015	Rubí	3 – 2	Sant Andreu	Rubí
19:30				Stadium: Can Rosés

=== Third round ===
The third round was drawn on 30 June and was played on 15 and 16 August.

- Bye: Rubí

15 August 2015	Figueres	1 – 0	Cerdanyola	Figueres
20:00				Stadium: Vilatenim

16 August 2015	Vilafranca	1 – 1 (5–6 p)	Reus	Vilafranca del Penedès
19:00				Stadium: Municipal

16 August 2015	Europa	0 – 1	Cornellà	Barcelona
19:00				Stadium: Nou Sardenya

=== Quarterfinals ===
The quarterfinals round was drawn on 31 August and was played on 30 September and 7 October.

30 September 2015	Cornellà	0 – 1	Girona	Cornellà de Llobregat
21:00				Stadium: Nou Camp

7 October 2015	Rubí	1 – 0	Llagostera	Rubí
20:00				Stadium: Can Rosés

7 October 2015	Reus	1 – 2	Sabadell	Reus
20:30				Stadium: Camp Nou

7 October 2015	Figueres	0 – 0 (1–3 p)	Barcelona B	Figueres
21:00				Stadium: Vilatenim

=== Semifinals ===
The semifinals round was drawn on 13 October and played on 11 November and 8 December.

11 November 2015	Barcelona B	1 – 0	Girona	Barcelona
21:00				Stadium: Mini Estadi

8 December 2015	Rubí	0 – 0 (2–4 p)	Sabadell	Rubí
12:00				Stadium: Can Roses

=== Final ===
30 March 2016
21:15

Sabadell	2-0	Barcelona B
Sandro 51'; Forgas 91'	Report

Nova Creu Alta, Sabadell
Attendance: 6870
Referee: Gustavo Rebollo López

Sabadell:
1	(Spain) Sergi Tienda
2	(Spain) Sergi Pastells		(substituted off) 84'
3	(Spain) Valentín Merchán
4	(Spain) José Manuel Alcañiz	(yellow card) 88'
5	(Spain) Agustín Fernández
6	(Spain) Yeray Sabariego
7	(Spain) Pirulo		(substituted off) 61'
8	(Spain) Adri Díaz		(substituted off) 79'
9	(Spain) Manel Martínez		(substituted off) 61'
10	(Italy) Sandro Toscano		(substituted off) 61'
11	(Spain) Marc Fernández		(substituted off) 72'
Substitutes:
12	(Spain) Pol Moreno		(substituted in) 79'
13	(Spain) Carlos Craviotto
14	(Spain) David Batanero		(substituted in) 72'
15	(Spain) Agus Medina		(substituted in) 61'
16	(Brazil) Bruno Vinicius		(substituted in) 61'
17	(Spain) Eloy Gila		(substituted in) 61'
18	(Spain) Ernest Forgas		(substituted in) 84'
Manager:
(Spain) Miguel Álvarez

Barcelona B:
1	(Spain) Adrián Ortolá	(yellow card) 82'
2	(Nigeria) Godswill Ekpolo		(substituted off) 74'
3	(Spain) Moi Delgado		(substituted off) 58'
4	(Spain) Fali	(yellow card) 52'	(substituted off) 58'
5	(Spain) Gerard Gumbau	(yellow card) 69'
6	(Spain) Sergi Samper	(yellow card) 54'
7	(Spain) Rafa Mújica	(yellow card) 84'
8	(Cameroon) Wilfrid Kaptoum	(yellow card) 84'
9	(Spain) Dani Romera		(substituted off) 15'
10	(Spain) Alberto Perea		(substituted off) 42'
11	(Spain) Juan Cámara		(substituted off) 20'
Substitutes:
12	(Spain) Sergi Palencia	(yellow card) 82'	(substituted in) 74'
13	(Spain) José Aurelio Suárez
14	(Spain) Juan Antonio Ros	(yellow card) 44'	(substituted in) 20'
15	(Spain) Xavi Quintillà		(substituted in) 42'
16	(Spain) Àlex Carbonell		(substituted in) 58'
18	(Brazil) Robert Gonçalves		(substituted in) 58'
19	(Spain) Salva Chamorro	(yellow card) 88'	(substituted in) 15'
Manager:
(Spain) Gerard López
