= 2014–15 Sevilla FC season =

108th season in existence of Sevilla FC

Sevilla FC
2014–15 season
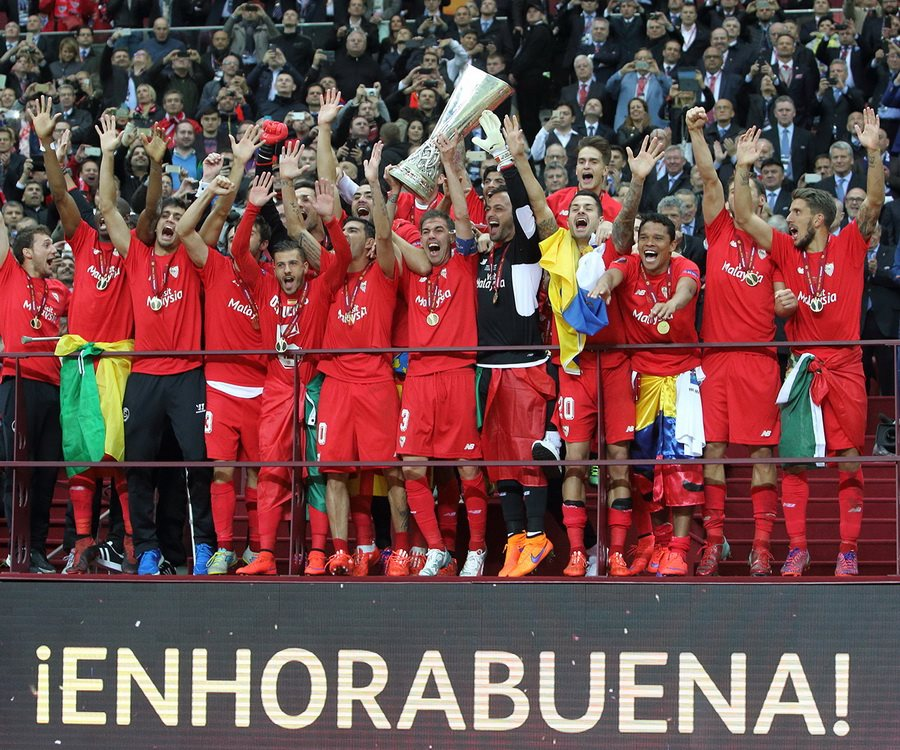
- Sevilla players lifting the UEFA Europa League trophy following the final at the Stadion Narodowy
- President: José Castro Carmona
- Head coach: Unai Emery
- Stadium: Ramón Sánchez Pizjuán
- La Liga: 5th
- Copa del Rey: Quarter-finals
- UEFA Europa League: Winners
- UEFA Super Cup: Runners-up
- Top goalscorer: League: Carlos Bacca (20); All: Carlos Bacca (28)
Home colours	Away colours	Third colours

The 2014–15 season was the 108th season in Sevilla FC's history, and 14th consecutive season in La Liga. The team competed in La Liga, the Copa del Rey, and the UEFA Europa League, winning the latter competition for a second consecutive year.

== Players ==
=== First team squad ===
As of 1 September 2014

Note: Flags indicate national team as defined under FIFA eligibility rules; some limited exceptions apply. Players may hold more than one non-FIFA nationality.

No.	Pos.	Nation	Player
1	GK	ARG	Mariano Barbosa
2	DF	FRA	Benoît Trémoulinas
3	DF	ESP	Fernando Navarro (captain)
4	MF	POL	Grzegorz Krychowiak
5	DF	POR	Diogo Figueiras
6	DF	POR	Daniel Carriço
7	FW	FRA	Kevin Gameiro
8	MF	URU	Sebastián Cristóforo
9	FW	COL	Carlos Bacca
10	MF	ESP	José Antonio Reyes
11	DF	BRA	Cicinho
12	MF	ESP	Vicente Iborra
13	GK	POR	Beto

No.	Pos.	Nation	Player
14	FW	ESP	Iago Aspas (on loan from Liverpool)
15	DF	FRA	Timothée Kolodziejczak
17	MF	ESP	Denis Suárez (on loan from Barcelona)
18	FW	ESP	Gerard Deulofeu (on loan from Barcelona)
19	MF	ARG	Éver Banega
20	MF	ESP	Vitolo
21	DF	ARG	Nicolás Pareja (3rd captain)
22	MF	ESP	Aleix Vidal
23	DF	ESP	Coke (vice-captain)
24	DF	ESP	Alejandro Arribas
25	MF	CMR	Stéphane Mbia
26	MF	ESP	Luismi
29	GK	ESP	Sergio Rico

== Competitions ==
=== Overall ===
Competition	Started round	Final position / round	First match	Last match
La Liga	Matchday 1	5th	23 August 2014	23 May 2015
Copa del Rey	Round of 32	Quarter-finals	29 October 2014	29 January 2015
UEFA Europa League	Group stage	Winners	18 September 2014	27 May 2015
UEFA Super Cup	Final	Runners-up	29 August 2014	

Updated to match played 27 May 2015
Source: Competitions

=== UEFA Super Cup ===
29 August 2014 Final	Real Madrid (Spain)	2–0	(Spain) Sevilla	Cardiff, Wales
19:45 BST (UTC+01:00)	Ronaldo 30', 49'; Carvajal (yellow card) 45'; Kroos (yellow card) 53'	Report	Vitolo (yellow card) 42'; Navarro (yellow card) 66'	Stadium: Cardiff City Stadium; Attendance: 30,854; Referee: Mark Clattenburg (England)

=== La Liga ===
==== League table ====
Pos	Team	Pld	W	D	L	GF	GA	GD	Pts	Qualification or relegation
3	Atlético Madrid	38	23	9	6	67	29	+38	78	Qualification for the Champions League group stage
4	Valencia	38	22	11	5	70	32	+38	77	Qualification for the Champions League play-off round
5	Sevilla	38	23	7	8	71	45	+26	76	Qualification for the Champions League group stage (Note: Sevilla qualified for the Champions League group stage by winning the 2014–15 UEFA Europa League. As a result, the fifth-placed spot for the Europa League group stage they earned was vacated without replacement as per UEFA regulations.)
6	Villarreal	38	16	12	10	48	37	+11	60	Qualification for the Europa League group stage (Note: Since the winners of the 2014–15 Copa del Rey, Barcelona, qualified for European competition based on league position, the spot awarded to the cup winners (Europa League group stage) was passed to the sixth-placed team, and the spot awarded to the sixth-placed team (Europa League third qualifying round) was passed to the seventh-placed team.)
7	Athletic Bilbao	38	15	10	13	42	41	+1	55	Qualification for the Europa League third qualifying round

Source: La Liga
Rules for classification: 1) points; 2) head-to-head points; 3) head-to-head goal difference; 4) goal difference; 5) number of goals scored; 6) fair-play points; 7) playoff match

==== Results summary ====
Overall								Home						Away					
Pld	W	D	L	GF	GA	GD	Pts	W	D	L	GF	GA	GD	W	D	L	GF	GA	GD
38	23	7	8	71	45	+26	76	13	5	1	38	13	+25	10	2	7	33	32	+1

Last updated: 23 May 2015.
Source: Competitive matches

==== Results by round ====
Round	1	2	3	4	5	6	7	8	9	10	11	12	13	14	15	16	17	18	19	20	21	22	23	24	25	26	27	28	29	30	31	32	33	34	35	36	37	38
Ground	H	A	H	A	H	A	H	A	H	A	H	A	H	A	H	H	A	H	A	H	A	A	H	A	H	A	H	A	H	A	H	A	H	A	H	A	H	A
Result	D	W	W	W	W	L	W	W	W	L	D	L	W	W	D	W	W	W	L	W	L	L	W	L	D	W	W	W	W	W	D	D	W	W	L	D	W	W
Position	10	5	3	3	3	4	3	2	2	5	5	6	6	6	6	4	4	4	5	4	4	5	5	5	5	5	5	5	5	5	5	5	5	5	5	5	5	5

Updated to match(es) played on 23 May 2015. Source: Competitive matches
A = Away; H = Home; W = Win; D = Draw; L = Loss

==== Matches ====
Win Draw Loss

23 August 2014 1	Sevilla	1–1	Valencia	Seville
21:00 CEST (UTC+02:00)	Vidal 44', (yellow card) 67'; Luisimi (yellow card) 90+2'; Carriço (yellow card) 90+2'; Coke (yellow card) 90+6'	Report	Parejo (yellow card) 40'; De Paul (red card) 67'; Alves (yellow card) 73'; Orbán 88'	Stadium: Ramón Sánchez Pizjuán; Attendance: 29,352; Referee: Carlos del Cerro Grande (Community of Madrid)

1 September 2014 2	Espanyol	1–2	Sevilla	Cornellà de Llobregat
22:00 CEST (UTC+02:00)	Colotto (yellow card) 30'; Casilla (yellow card) 56'; Stuani 61'; Sánchez (yellow card) 64'; Vázquez (yellow card) 90'	Report	Bacca 34'; Vitolo (yellow card) 35'; Iborra 57'; Navarro (yellow card) 72'	Stadium: Cornellà-El Prat; Attendance: 16,490; Referee: Alberto Undiano Mallenco (Navarre)

14 September 2014 3	Sevilla	2–0	Getafe	Seville
20:00 CEST (UTC+02:00)	Krychowiak (yellow card) 35'; Carriço (yellow card) 43'; Bacca 44' (pen.); Vidal 87'	Report	Arroyo (yellow card) 18'; Guaita (yellow card) 43'; Alexis (yellow card) 43'; Castro (yellow card) 65'; Hinestroza (yellow card) 76'	Stadium: Ramón Sánchez Pizjuán; Attendance: 34,600; Referee: Alfonso Javier Álvarez Izquierdo (Catalonia)

21 September 2014 4	Córdoba	1–3	Sevilla	Córdoba
19:00 CEST (UTC+02:00)	López (yellow card) 14'; Rossi (yellow card) 20'; Gunino (yellow card) 31'; Havenaar (yellow card) 47'; Borja 83'; Cartabia (yellow card) 84'; Pantić (yellow card) 87'	Report	Bacca 8', 88' (pen.); Coke (yellow card) 21'; Mbia 72'; Vidal (yellow card) 74'	Stadium: Nuevo Arcángel; Attendance: 17,023; Referee: Carlos Velasco Carballo (Community of Madrid)

24 September 2014 5	Sevilla	1–0	Real Sociedad	Seville
22:00 CEST (UTC+02:00)	Deulofeu 18'; Figueiras (yellow card) 47'; Mbia (yellow card) 48'; Kolodziejczak (yellow card) 53'; Bacca (yellow card) 55'; Trémoulinas (yellow card) 76'; Beto (yellow card) 78'	Report	González (yellow card) 9'; Granero (yellow card) 64'	Stadium: Ramón Sánchez Pizjuán; Attendance: 29,456; Referee: Antonio Mateu Lahoz (Valencian Community)

27 September 2014 6	Atlético Madrid	4–0	Sevilla	Madrid
20:00 CEST (UTC+02:00)	Koke 19', (yellow card) 60'; Mandžukić (yellow card) 27'; Saúl 42'; Godín (yellow card) 61'; García 83' (pen.), (yellow card) 88'; Jiménez 89'	Report	Kolodziejczak (yellow card) 18'; Pareja (yellow card) 20'; Banega (yellow card) 88'	Stadium: Vicente Calderón; Attendance: 52,000; Referee: José Luis González González (Castile and León)

5 October 2014 7	Sevilla	4–1	Deportivo La Coruña	Seville
12:00 CEST (UTC+02:00)	Mbia (yellow card) 9', (goal) 24', 57'; Coke (yellow card) 30'; Bacca 39'; Vitolo 63'	Report	Medunjanin 31'; Lux (yellow card) 68'; Wilk (yellow card) 78'	Stadium: Ramón Sánchez Pizjuán; Attendance: 31,000; Referee: Jesús Gil Manzano (Extremadura)

19 October 2014 8	Elche	0–2	Sevilla	Elche
19:00 CEST (UTC+02:00)	Alonso (yellow card) 39'; Giménez (yellow card) 55'; Suárez (yellow card) 60'; Mosquera (yellow card) 66'; Rodrigues (yellow card) 77'	Report	Coke (yellow card) 21'; Mbia (yellow card) 30'; Bacca 59'; Gameiro 73'	Stadium: Manuel Martínez; Attendance: 26,059; Referee: Eduardo Prieto Iglesias (Navarre)

26 October 2014 9	Sevilla	2–1	Villarreal	Seville
19:00 CET (UTC+01:00)	Carriço (yellow card) 9'; Trémoulinas (yellow card) 64'; Mbia (yellow card) 73'; Suárez 88'; Bacca 90+3' (pen.)	Report	Cheryshev (yellow card) 21'; Gómez (yellow card) 27'; Mario (yellow card) 67'; G. Dos Santos (yellow card) 85'; Vietto 79'	Stadium: Ramón Sánchez Pizjuán; Attendance: 34,500; Referee: Alejandro José Hernández Hernández (Canary Islands)

2 November 2014 10	Athletic Bilbao	1–0	Sevilla	Bilbao
12:00 CET (UTC+01:00)	Aduriz (yellow card) 1', (goal) 13'; Iturraspe (yellow card) 23'; Etxeita (yellow card) 43'	Report	Pareja (yellow card) 12'; Mbia (yellow card) 34'; Bacca (yellow card) 57'	Stadium: San Mamés; Attendance: 42,000; Referee: Xavier Estrada Fernández (Catalonia)

9 November 2014 11	Sevilla	1–1	Levante	Seville
12:00 CET (UTC+01:00)	Vitolo 31'; Suárez (yellow card) 54'; Banega (yellow card) 87'	Report	Barral (yellow card) 8'; Ivanschitz (yellow card) 12'; Juanfran (yellow card) 62'; Víctor 80'; Mariño (yellow card) 84'; Sissoko (yellow card) 89'; Xumetra (yellow card) 90'	Stadium: Ramón Sánchez Pizjuán; Attendance: 28,500; Referee: Carlos Velasco Carballo (Community of Madrid)

22 November 2014 12	Barcelona	5–1	Sevilla	Barcelona
20:00 CET (UTC+01:00)	Messi 21', 72', 78'; Neymar 49'; Mathieu (yellow card) 56'; Rakitić 65'	Report	Coke (yellow card) 36'; Alba 47' (o.g.); Pareja (yellow card) 48'	Stadium: Camp Nou; Attendance: 78,283; Referee: Carlos Clos Gómez (Aragon)

30 November 2014 13	Sevilla	5–1	Granada	Seville
17:00 CET (UTC+01:00)	Bacca 24', 79'; Banega 65'; Krychowiak (yellow card) 77'; Mbia 89'; Gameiro 90+2'	Report	Roberto (yellow card) 24'; Piti (yellow card) 24'; El-Arabi 42' (pen.)	Stadium: Ramón Sánchez Pizjuán; Attendance: 30,347; Referee: Eduardo Prieto Iglesias (Navarre)

7 December 2014 14	Rayo Vallecano	0–1	Sevilla	Madrid
12:00 CET (UTC+01:00)	Roberto Trashorras (yellow card) 15'; Baena (yellow card) 33'; Ba (yellow card) 36'; Manucho (yellow card) 73'	Report	Bacca 8', (yellow card) 82'; Krychowiak (yellow card) 30'; Vitolo (yellow card) 36'; Pareja (yellow card) 40'; Banega (yellow card) 65'; Carriço (yellow card) 75' (yellow-red card) 87'; Beto (yellow card) 90+3'	Stadium: Campo de Vallecas; Attendance: 11,604; Referee: Alfonso Javier Álvarez Izquierdo (Catalonia)

14 December 2014 15	Sevilla	0–0	Eibar	Seville
17:00 CET (UTC+01:00)	Arribas (yellow card) 52'; Krychowiak (yellow card) 85'; Suárez (yellow card) 88'	Report	Lillo (yellow card) 17'; Abraham (yellow card) 22'; Albentosa (yellow card) 52'; García (yellow card) 80'; Lara (yellow card) 88'; Piovaccari (yellow card) 90+3'	Stadium: Ramón Sánchez Pizjuán; Attendance: 20,000; Referee: Xavier Estrada Fernández (Catalonia)

3 January 2015 17	Sevilla	1–0	Celta Vigo	Seville
18:00 CET (UTC+01:00)	Vitolo (yellow card) 20'; Pareja 32'; Reyes (yellow card) 45'; Carriço (yellow card) 45+1'; Krychowiak (yellow card) 52'	Report	Cabral (yellow card) 21'; Planas (red card) 21'; Mallo (yellow card) 31'; Mina (yellow card) 58'; Krohn-Dehli (yellow card) 75'; Orellana (yellow card) 79'	Stadium: Ramón Sánchez Pizjuán; Attendance: 31,253; Referee: Carlos Velasco Carballo (Community of Madrid)

11 January 2015 18	Almería	0–2	Sevilla	Almería
12:00 CET (UTC+01:00)	Thomas (yellow card) 19'	Report	Vidal (yellow card) 16'; Pareja (yellow card) 41'; Iborra 58'; Coke 63'	Stadium: Juegos Mediterráneos; Attendance: 16,000; Referee: Eduardo Prieto Iglesias (Navarre)

18 January 2015 19	Sevilla	2–0	Málaga	Seville
21:00 CET (UTC+01:00)	Krychowiak (yellow card) 8'; Reyes (yellow card) 18'; Iborra (yellow card) 33'; Bacca 36'; Suárez 68'; Beto (yellow card) 81'	Report	Recio (yellow card) 20'	Stadium: Ramón Sánchez Pizjuán; Attendance: 24,000; Referee: José Antonio Teixeira Vitienes (Cantabria)

25 January 2015 20	Valencia	3–1	Sevilla	Valencia
21:00 CET (UTC+01:00)	Parejo 18' (pen.), 32', (yellow card) 32'; Fuego (yellow card) 36', (goal) 56'; Cancelo (yellow card) 40'; Pérez (yellow card) 43'; Gayà (yellow card) 90+1'; Otamendi (yellow card) 90+3'	Report	Figueiras (yellow card) 17'; Bacca 36' (pen.); Banega (yellow card) 59'; Vitolo (yellow card) 65'; Krychowiak (yellow card) 66'; Iborra (yellow card) 90+1'	Stadium: Mestalla; Attendance: 46,704; Referee: Santiago Jaime Latre (Aragon)

1 February 2015 21	Sevilla	3–2	Espanyol	Seville
19:00 CET (UTC+01:00)	Vidal (yellow card) 12'; Beto (yellow card) 14'; Figueiras 26', (yellow card) 56'; Vitolo 35'; Iborra (yellow card) 37'; Arribas (yellow card) 44'; Banega (yellow card) 66'; Bacca (yellow card) 81'; Aspas 89', (yellow card) 89'	Report	Cañas (yellow card) 13'; Stuani 15' (pen.); Sánchez (yellow card) 21', (goal) 77'; Casilla (red card) 40'; Vázquez (yellow card) 45+2'	Stadium: Ramón Sánchez Pizjuán; Attendance: 27,955; Referee: José Luis González González (Castile and León)

4 February 2015 16	Real Madrid	2–1	Sevilla	Madrid
20:45 CET (UTC+01:00)	James 12'; Jesé 36'; Varane (yellow card) 45'; Marcelo (yellow card) 60'; Isco (yellow card) 86'	Report	Figueiras (yellow card) 41'; Navarro (yellow card) 42'; Mbia (yellow card) 45+5'; Carriço (yellow card) 66'; Vitolo (yellow card) 71'; Vidal (yellow card) 76'; Aspas 80'	Stadium: Santiago Bernabéu; Attendance: 67,126; Referee: Ignacio Iglesias Villanueva (Galicia)

8 February 2015 22	Getafe	2–1	Sevilla	Getafe
17:00 CET (UTC+01:00)	Vázquez 29'; Jonathan (yellow card) 58'; Pedro León 85'	Report	Banega (yellow card) 55'; Krychowiak 66'; Figueiras (yellow card) 87'	Stadium: Coliseum Alfonso Pérez; Attendance: 5,000; Referee: Xavier Estrada Fernández (Catalonia)

14 February 2015 23	Sevilla	3–0	Córdoba	Seville
16:00 CET (UTC+01:00)	Krychowiak 38', (red card) 73'; Bacca 44'; Iborra 76'	Report	Ekeng (red card) 54'; Krhin (yellow card) 74'	Stadium: Ramón Sánchez Pizjuán; Attendance: 29,450; Referee: Iñaki Vicandi Garrido (Basque Country)

22 February 2015 24	Real Sociedad	4–3	Sevilla	San Sebastián
12:00 CET (UTC+01:00)	De la Bella (yellow card) 12'; Agirretxe 16'; Prieto 48' (pen.), 90', (yellow card) 54'; I. Martínez (yellow card) 77'; Arribas 82' (o.g.); Granero (yellow card) 88'; Rulli (yellow card) 90+2'	Report	Kolodziejczak 43'; Trémoulinas (yellow card) 47'; Iborra (yellow card) 48'; Bacca 67'; Gameiro 78' (pen.); Carriço (yellow card) 80'	Stadium: Anoeta; Attendance: 21,378; Referee: Fernando Teixeira Vitienes (Cantabria)

1 March 2015 25	Sevilla	0–0	Atlético Madrid	Seville
19:00 CET (UTC+01:00)	Arribas (yellow card) 20'; Krychowiak (yellow card) 49'; Mbia (yellow card) 81'; Banega (yellow card) 90+2'	Report	Turan (yellow card) 37'; Gabi (yellow card) 43'; Gámez (yellow card) 51'; Griezmann (yellow card) 52'; Suárez (yellow card) 55'; Tiago (yellow card) 64'; Miranda (yellow card) 87'	Stadium: Ramón Sánchez Pizjuán; Attendance: 36,001; Referee: Carlos Clos Gómez (Aragon)

7 March 2015 26	Deportivo La Coruña	3–4	Sevilla	A Coruña
16:00 CET (UTC+01:00)	Riera 28', 72'; Bergantiños (yellow card) 63'; Lucas 90+3' (pen.)	Report	Vitolo 33', 52'; Iborra (yellow card) 43'; Krychowiak (yellow card) 45'; Banega (yellow card) 49'; Gameiro 65' (pen.); Sidnei 83' (o.g.); Figueiras (yellow card) 86'	Stadium: Riazor; Attendance: 21,555; Referee: José Antonio Teixeira Vitienes (Cantabria)

15 March 2015 27	Sevilla	3–0	Elche	Seville
19:00 CET (UTC+01:00)	Bacca 18' (pen.), 31'; Krychowiak (yellow card) 33'; Banega (yellow card) 78'; Gameiro 81'	Report	Coro (yellow card) 17'; José Ángel (yellow card) 37'; Cisma (yellow card) 56'	Stadium: Ramón Sánchez Pizjuán; Attendance: 31,324; Referee: Xavier Estrada Fernández (Catalonia)

22 March 2015 28	Villarreal	0–2	Sevilla	Villarreal
17:00 CET (UTC+01:00)	Gómez (yellow card) 67'; Musacchio (yellow card) 77'	Report	Coke 49'; Vitolo 65'; Navarro (yellow card) 74'	Stadium: El Madrigal; Attendance: 9,788; Referee: Alejandro José Hernández Hernández (Las Palmas)

4 April 2015 29	Sevilla	2–0	Athletic Bilbao	Seville
16:00 CET (UTC+01:00)	Vidal 3'; Bacca 21'; Pareja (yellow card) 60'; Vitolo (yellow card) 67'; Banega (yellow card) 71'	Report	Laporte (yellow card) 34'; Fernández (yellow card) 69'; Beñat (yellow card) 74'	Stadium: Ramón Sánchez Pizjuán; Attendance: 27,752; Referee: Alfonso Javier Álvarez Izquierdo (Catalonia)

7 April 2015 30	Levante	1–2	Sevilla	Valencia
22:00 CEST (UTC+02:00)	Juanfran (yellow card) 40'; Uche 73'; Víctor (yellow card) 90'; El Zhar (yellow card) 90+2'; Toño (yellow card) 90+2'	Report	Gameiro 10'; Trémoulinas (yellow card) 19'; Carriço (yellow card) 23'; Reyes 37'; Figueiras (yellow card) 43'; Kolodziejczak (yellow card) 45'; Rico (yellow card) 89'	Stadium: Ciutat de València; Attendance: 11,484; Referee: Carlos Velasco Carballo (Community of Madrid)

11 April 2015 31	Sevilla	2–2	Barcelona	Seville
20:00 CEST (UTC+02:00)	Krychowiak (yellow card) 29'; Banega 38', (yellow card) 57'; Iborra (yellow card) 46'; Reyes (yellow card) 77'; Mbia (yellow card) 82'; Gameiro 84'	Report	Messi 14'; Neymar 31'; Busquets (yellow card) 61'; Piqué (yellow card) 62'	Stadium: Ramón Sánchez Pizjuán; Attendance: 40,355; Referee: Juan Martínez Munuera (Valencian Community)

18 April 2015 32	Granada	1–1	Sevilla	Granada
17:00 CEST (UTC+02:00)	Mainz 16'; Rico (yellow card) 65'; Pérez (yellow card) 90+3'	Report	Reyes (yellow card) 6'; Mainz 69' (o.g.); Mbia (yellow card) 79'	Stadium: Nuevo Los Cármenes; Attendance: 18,247; Referee: Xavier Estrada Fernández (Catalonia)

25 April 2015 33	Sevilla	2–0	Rayo Vallecano	Seville
19:00 CEST (UTC+02:00)	Iborra 16'; Carriço 43'	Report	Morcillo (yellow card) 31'; Insúa (yellow card) 76'	Stadium: Ramón Sánchez Pizjuán; Attendance: 28,532; Referee: Santiago Jaime Latre (Aragon)

28 April 2015 34	Eibar	1–3	Sevilla	Eibar
20:00 CEST (UTC+02:00)	Piovaccari 51', (yellow card) 90+1'; Lillo (yellow card) 60'; Arruabarrena (yellow card) 86'	Report	Bacca 7', 15'; Iborra (yellow card) 26'; Reyes 64'; Vidal (yellow card) 88'	Stadium: Ipurua Municipal; Attendance: 5,517; Referee: Eduardo Prieto Iglesias (Navarre)

2 May 2015 35	Sevilla	2–3	Real Madrid	Seville
20:00 CEST (UTC+02:00)	Bacca 45+2' (pen.); Reyes (yellow card) 67'; Iborra 79'; Trémoulinas (yellow card) 87'; Carriço (yellow card) 90+1'; Vidal (yellow card) 90+3'	Report	Ronaldo 36', 37', 69'; Ramos (yellow card) 45+1'; Carvajal (yellow card) 51'	Stadium: Estadio Ramón Sánchez Pizjuán; Attendance: 39,689; Referee: José Luis González González (Castile and León)

10 May 2015 36	Celta Vigo	1–1	Sevilla	Vigo
21:00 CEST (UTC+02:00)	Fernández (yellow card) 45+1'; Mina (yellow card) 45+2', (goal) 58' (pen.); Costas (yellow card) 90+1'	Report	Gameiro 8'; Coke (yellow card) 36'; Aspas (yellow card) 40'; Rico (yellow card) 41'; Arribas (yellow card) 57'; Krychowiak (yellow card) 59'	Stadium: Balaídos; Attendance: 18,957; Referee: Carlos Velasco Carballo (Community of Madrid)

17 May 2015 37	Sevilla	2–1	Almería	Seville
19:00 CEST (UTC+02:00)	Iborra 65', 71'	Report	Bifouma 30'; Corona (yellow card) 60'; Rubén (yellow card) 68'; Thomas (yellow card) 73'; Trujillo (red card) 75'; Dubarbier (yellow card) 83'	Stadium: Ramón Sánchez Pizjuán; Attendance: 32,511; Referee: Iñaki Vicandi Garrido (Basque Country)

23 May 2015 38	Málaga	2–3	Sevilla	Málaga
18:30 CEST (UTC+02:00)	Recio (yellow card) 26'; Weligton (red card) 26'; Angeleri (yellow card) 35'; Guerra 67', 90+2'; Tissone (yellow card) 90+2'	Report	Vidal (yellow card) 13', (goal) 62'; Krychowiak (yellow card) 35'; Reyes 52'; Banega 55'	Stadium: La Rosaleda; Attendance: 23,103; Referee: Ignacio Iglesias Villanueva (Galicia)

=== Copa del Rey ===
==== Round of 32 ====
29 October 2014 First leg	Sabadell	1–6	Sevilla	Sabadell
22:00 CET (UTC+01:00)	Crespí (yellow card) 48'; Forgàs 75'; Yeray (yellow card) 89'; Nauzet (yellow card) 89'	Report	Navarro (yellow card) 5'; Kolodziejczak 28'; Aspas 43', 59', 90+3' (pen.); Gameiro 66'; Reyes 70'; Arribas (yellow card) 82'	Stadium: Nova Creu Alta; Attendance: 6,157; Referee: Iñaki Vicandi Garrido (Basque Country)

3 December 2014 Second leg	Sevilla	5–1 (11–2 agg.)	Sabadell	Seville
20:00 CET (UTC+01:00)	Kolodziejczak (yellow card) 20'; Gameiro 35'; Aspas 58', 59', 62'; Deulofeu 80'	Summary	Hidalgo (yellow card) 14'; Collantes 22' (pen.); Cabrera (yellow card) 31'; Tanabe (yellow card) 37'; Eguaras (yellow card) 56'	Stadium: Ramón Sánchez Pizjuán; Attendance: 6,000; Referee: Jesús Gil Manzano (Extremadura)

==== Round of 16 ====
8 January 2015 First leg	Granada	1–2	Sevilla	Granada
20:00 CET (UTC+01:00)	Yuste (yellow card) 37'; Sissoko (yellow card) 38'; Bangoura 90+3'	Report	Deulofeu 31'; Krychowiak (yellow card) 41'; Iborra (yellow card) 48'; Gameiro 53'	Stadium: Los Cármenes; Attendance: 11,701; Referee: Antonio Mateu Lahoz (Valencian Community)

14 January 2015 Second leg	Sevilla	4–0 (6–1 agg.)	Granada	Seville
22:00 CET (UTC+01:00)	Gameiro 18', 55'; Aspas 27'; Suárez 64'; Reyes (yellow card) 86'	Summary	Foulquier (yellow card) 68'; Nyom (yellow card) 71'; Roberto (yellow card) 89'	Stadium: Ramón Sánchez Pizjuán; Attendance: 14,104; Referee: Carlos Clos Gómez (Aragon)

==== Quarter-finals ====
22 January 2015 First leg	Espanyol	3–1	Sevilla	Cornellà de Llobregat
22:00 CET (UTC+01:00)	Montañés (yellow card) 11'; Caicedo 18', (yellow card) 37'; Álvaro (yellow card) 55'; Arbilla (yellow card) 60'; García 73' (pen.), (yellow card) 85'; Sánchez (yellow card) 75'; Vázquez 80'; Stuani (yellow card) 83'	Report	Arribas (yellow card) 62'; Pareja (yellow card) 72'; Bacca 89'	Stadium: Cornellà-El Prat; Attendance: 14,838; Referee: Jesús Gil Manzano (Extremadura)

29 January 2015 Second leg	Sevilla	1–0 (2–3 agg.)	Espanyol	Seville
22:00 CET (UTC+01:00)	Bacca (yellow card) 27'; Pareja (yellow card) 37'; Carriço (yellow card) 56'; Figueiras 88'	Summary	Arbilla (yellow card) 11'; Álvaro (yellow card) 55'; Álvarez (yellow card) 57'	Stadium: Ramón Sánchez Pizjuán; Attendance: 39,055; Referee: Juan Martínez Munuera (Valencian Community)

=== UEFA Europa League ===
==== Group stage ====
Pos	Team	Pld	W	D	L	GF	GA	GD	Pts	Qualification	FEY	SEV	RIJ	STA
1	(Netherlands) Feyenoord	6	4	0	2	10	6	+4	12	Advance to knockout phase	—	2–0	2–0	2–1
2	(Spain) Sevilla	6	3	2	1	8	5	+3	11	Advance to knockout phase	2–0	—	1–0	3–1
3	(Croatia) Rijeka	6	2	1	3	7	8	−1	7		3–1	2–2	—	2–0
4	(Belgium) Standard Liège	6	1	1	4	4	10	−6	4		0–3	0–0	2–0	—

Source: Soccerway
Rules for classification: Group stage tiebreakers

18 September 2014 1	Sevilla (Spain)	2–0	(Netherlands) Feyenoord	Seville, Spain
21:05 CEST (UTC+02:00)	Krychowiak 8'; Mbia 31', (yellow card) 76'; Kolodziejczak (yellow card) 33'	Report	Vilhena (yellow card) 52'; Manu (yellow card) 81'	Stadium: Ramón Sánchez Pizjuán; Attendance: 35,000; Referee: Ruddy Buquet (France)

2 October 2014 2	Rijeka (Croatia)	2–2	(Spain) Sevilla	Rijeka, Croatia
19:00 CEST (UTC+02:00)	Cvijanović (yellow card) 13'; Kvržić (yellow card) 19', (goal) 68'; Kramarić 53' (pen.)	Report	Aspas 26'; Kolodziejczak (red card) 52'; Navarro (yellow card) 87'; Mbia 90+1'	Stadium: Stadion Kantrida; Attendance: 10,000; Referee: Kenn Hansen (Denmark)

23 October 2014 3	Standard Liège (Belgium)	0–0	(Spain) Sevilla	Liège, Belgium
19:00 CEST (UTC+02:00)	Mujangi Bia (yellow card) 17'; Trebel (yellow card) 50'	Report	Arribas (yellow card) 40'; Navarro (yellow card) 51'; Banega (yellow card) 53'; Krychowiak (yellow card) 81'	Stadium: Stade Maurice Dufrasne; Attendance: 15,000; Referee: Hüseyin Göçek (Turkey)

6 November 2014 4	Sevilla (Spain)	3–1	(Belgium) Standard Liège	Seville, Spain
21:05 CET (UTC+01:00)	Gameiro 19'; Carriço (yellow card) 31'; Reyes 41'; Suárez (yellow card) 48'; Mbia (yellow card) 66'; Bacca 90'	Report	M'Poku 32'; Trebel (yellow card) 45'; Ciman (yellow card) 49'; Enoh (yellow card) 77'; Arslanagić (yellow card) 85'	Stadium: Ramón Sánchez Pizjuán; Attendance: 35,000; Referee: Bobby Madden (Scotland)

27 November 2014 5	Feyenoord (Netherlands)	2–0	(Spain) Sevilla	Rotterdam, Netherlands
19:00 CET (UTC+01:00)	Toornstra 56'; Boëtius (yellow card) 66'; Van Beek (yellow card) 73'; El Ahmedi 83', (yellow card) 90+1'; Kazim-Richards (yellow card) 89'	Summary	Arribas (yellow card) 83'; Krychowiak (yellow card) 90+1'	Stadium: De Kuip; Attendance: 19,500; Referee: Slavko Vinčić (Slovenia)

11 December 2014 6	Sevilla (Spain)	1–0	(Croatia) Rijeka	Seville, Spain
21:05 CET (UTC+01:00)	Vitolo (yellow card) 14'; Suárez 20'; Mbia (yellow card) 37'; Bacca (yellow card) 53'; Pareja (yellow card) 88'	Summary	Močinić (yellow card) 61'; Vešović (yellow card) 74'; Tomečak (yellow card) 76'; Ivančić (yellow card) 90'	Stadium: Ramón Sánchez Pizjuán; Attendance: 24,967; Referee: Manuel Gräfe (Germany)

==== Knockout phase ====
===== Round of 32 =====
19 February 2015 First leg	Sevilla (Spain)	1–0	(Germany) Borussia Mönchengladbach	Seville, Spain
21:05 CET (UTC+01:00)	Vitolo (yellow card) 30'; Iborra 70'; Carriço (yellow card) 75'	Report	Jantschke (yellow card) 8'; Xhaka (yellow card) 14'; Stranzl (yellow card) 43'; Kramer (yellow card) 65'	Stadium: Ramón Sánchez Pizjuán; Attendance: 26,850; Referee: Aleksandar Stavrev (Macedonia)

26 February 2015 Second leg	Borussia Mönchengladbach (Germany)	2–3 (2–4 agg.)	(Spain) Sevilla	Mönchengladbach, Germany
19:00 CET (UTC+01:00)	Xhaka 19', (yellow card) 32' (yellow-red card) 69'; Hazard 29', (yellow card) 54'; Kramer (yellow card) 68'	Report	Bacca 8', (yellow card) 45+2'; Vitolo 26', 79'; Iborra (yellow card) 30'; Rico (yellow card) 45'; Vidal (yellow card) 66'; Gameiro (yellow card) 90+2'	Stadium: Borussia-Park; Attendance: 45,337; Referee: Marijo Strahonja (Croatia)

===== Round of 16 =====
12 March 2015 First leg	Villarreal (Spain)	1–3	(Spain) Sevilla	Villarreal, Spain
21:05 CET (UTC+01:00)	Costa (yellow card) 21'; Gómez (yellow card) 35'; Vietto 48'; Campbell (yellow card) 67'	Report	Vitolo 1'; Krychowiak (yellow card) 9'; Mbia 26'; Gameiro 50'; Vidal (yellow card) 90+2'	Stadium: El Madrigal; Attendance: 22,500; Referee: Daniele Orsato (Italy)

19 March 2015 Second leg	Sevilla (Spain)	2–1 (5–2 agg.)	(Spain) Villarreal	Seville, Spain
21:05 CET (UTC+01:00)	Iborra 69'; Suárez 83'	Report	Vietto (yellow card) 22'; Bailly (yellow card) 29' (yellow-red card) 77'; Pina (yellow card) 58'; Musacchio (yellow card) 66'; G. Dos Santos 73'; Mario (yellow card) 85'	Stadium: Ramón Sánchez Pizjuán; Attendance: 35,000; Referee: Martin Atkinson (England)

===== Quarter-finals =====
16 April 2015 First leg	Sevilla (Spain)	2–1	(Russia) Zenit Saint Petersburg	Seville, Spain
21:05 CEST (UTC+02:00)	Bacca 73'; Suárez (yellow card) 76', (goal) 88'	Report	Ryazantsev 29', (yellow card) 82'; García (yellow card) 68'; Garay (yellow card) 81'	Stadium: Ramón Sánchez Pizjuán; Attendance: 28,000; Referee: Bas Nijhuis (Netherlands)

23 April 2015 Second leg	Zenit Saint Petersburg (Russia)	2–2 (3–4 agg.)	(Spain) Sevilla	Saint Petersburg, Russia
21:05 CEST (UTC+02:00)	Neto (yellow card) 5'; Witsel (yellow card) 40'; Rondón 48'; Hulk 72'; Lodigin (yellow card) 90+5'	Report	Bacca 6' (pen.); Iborra (yellow card) 76'; Banega (yellow card) 83'; Gameiro 85'	Stadium: Petrovsky Stadium; Attendance: 24,000; Referee: Nicola Rizzoli (Italy)

===== Semi-finals =====
7 May 2015 First leg	Sevilla (Spain)	3–0	(Italy) Fiorentina	Seville, Spain
21:05 CEST (UTC+02:00)	Vidal 17', 52'; Carriço (yellow card) 46'; Gameiro 75'; Krychowiak (yellow card) 83'	Report	Alonso (yellow card) 70'; Valero (yellow card) 78'; Gonzalo (yellow card) 90+5'	Stadium: Ramón Sánchez Pizjuán; Attendance: 35,840; Referee: Felix Brych (Germany)

14 May 2015 Second leg	Fiorentina (Italy)	0–2 (0–5 agg.)	(Spain) Sevilla	Florence, Italy
21:05 CEST (UTC+02:00)	Pizarro (yellow card) 21'; Savić (yellow card) 26'; Valero (yellow card) 49'	Report	Bacca 22'; Carriço 27'; Banega (yellow card) 34'	Stadium: Stadio Artemio Franchi; Attendance: 32,466; Referee: Damir Skomina (Slovenia)

===== Final =====
27 May 2015 Final	Dnipro Dnipropetrovsk (Ukraine)	2–3	(Spain) Sevilla	Warsaw, Poland
20:45 CEST (UTC+02:00)	Kalinić 7', (yellow card) 45+2'; Kankava (yellow card) 17'; Rotan 44', (yellow card) 75'; Bezus (yellow card) 70'; Matos (yellow card) 83'	Report	Krychowiak 28', (yellow card) 45+2'; Bacca 31', 73', (yellow card) 74'; Carriço (yellow card) 62'	Stadium: National Stadium; Attendance: 45,000; Referee: Martin Atkinson (England)

== Statistics ==
=== Appearances and goals ===
No.	Pos	Nat	Player	Total		La Liga		Copa del Rey		Europa League		Super Cup	
No.	Pos	Nat	Player	Apps	Goals	Apps	Goals	Apps	Goals	Apps	Goals	Apps	Goals
Goalkeepers
1	GK	(Argentina) ARG	Mariano Barbosa	2	0	1+1	0	0	0	0	0	0	0
13	GK	(Portugal) POR	Beto	25	0	18	0	1	0	5	0	1	0
29	GK	(Spain) ESP	Sergio Rico	37	0	19+2	0	5	0	10+1	0	0	0
Defenders
2	DF	(France) FRA	Benoît Trémoulinas	30	0	18+2	0	0	0	9+1	0	0	0
3	DF	(Spain) ESP	Fernando Navarro	32	0	15+4	0	6	0	5+1	0	1	0
5	DF	(Portugal) POR	Diogo Figueiras	38	2	19+5	1	4+1	1	6+2	0	0+1	0
6	DF	(Portugal) POR	Daniel Carriço	45	2	28	1	2	0	14	1	1	0
15	DF	(France) FRA	Timothée Kolodziejczak	32	2	18	1	4+1	1	9	0	0	0
21	DF	(Argentina) ARG	Nicolás Pareja	37	1	26	1	3	0	7	0	1	0
23	DF	(Spain) ESP	Coke	34	2	21+1	2	3	0	6+2	0	1	0
24	DF	(Spain) ESP	Alejandro Arribas	18	0	10+1	0	4	0	2+1	0	0	0
Midfielders
4	MF	(Poland) POL	Grzegorz Krychowiak	48	4	31+1	2	2	0	13	2	1	0
8	MF	(Uruguay) URU	Sebastián Cristóforo	2	0	0	0	2	0	0	0	0	0
10	MF	(Spain) ESP	José Antonio Reyes	37	5	15+4	3	3+1	1	10+3	1	0+1	0
12	MF	(Spain) ESP	Vicente Iborra	41	9	24+2	7	3+1	0	7+4	2	0	0
17	MF	(Spain) ESP	Denis Suárez	46	6	16+15	2	5	1	3+6	3	1	0
19	MF	(Argentina) ARG	Éver Banega	49	3	23+11	3	2+1	0	11+1	0	0	0
20	MF	(Spain) ESP	Vitolo	42	9	25+3	6	2	0	9+2	3	1	0
22	MF	(Spain) ESP	Aleix Vidal	47	6	22+9	4	2+2	0	11	2	1	0
25	MF	(Cameroon) CMR	Stéphane Mbia	36	7	17+6	4	0	0	10+3	3	0	0
26	MF	(Spain) ESP	Luismi	1	0	0+1	0	0	0	0	0	0	0
27	MF	(Spain) ESP	Antonio Cotán	2	0	0	0	1+1	0	0	0	0	0
31	MF	(Spain) ESP	Francisco Tena	1	0	0	0	0+1	0	0	0	0	0
Forwards
7	FW	(France) FRA	Kevin Gameiro	44	17	7+19	8	5+1	5	6+6	4	0	0
9	FW	(Colombia) COL	Carlos Bacca	56	28	31+6	20	1+2	1	8+7	7	1	0
14	FW	(Spain) ESP	Iago Aspas	25	10	4+12	2	3+2	7	2+1	1	0+1	0
18	FW	(Spain) ESP	Gerard Deulofeu	28	3	10+7	1	3+3	2	2+3	0	0	0
30	FW	(Spain) ESP	Juan Muñoz	2	0	0+1	0	0+1	0	0	0	0	0
33	FW	(Spain) ESP	Carlos Fernández	1	0	0+1	0	0	0	0	0	0	0
Players transferred out during the season
2	DF	(Argentina) ARG	Federico Fazio	1	0	0	0	0	0	0	0	1	0
11	DF	(Brazil) BRA	Cicinho	0	0	0	0	0	0	0	0	0	0

Last updated: 30 May 2015
Source: BDFutbol

=== Goalscorers ===
This includes all competitive matches. The list is sorted by shirt number when total goals are equal.

Rank	Pos	No.	Nat	Name	La Liga	Copa del Rey	Europa League	Total
1	FW	9	(Colombia)	Carlos Bacca	20	1	7	28
2	FW	7	(France)	Kevin Gameiro	8	5	4	16
3	MF	12	(Spain)	Vicente Iborra	7	0	2	9
3	MF	20	(Spain)	Vitolo	6	0	3	9
4	MF	25	(Cameroon)	Stéphane Mbia	4	0	3	7
5	MF	22	(Spain)	Aleix Vidal	4	0	2	6
6	MF	17	(Spain)	Denis Suárez	2	0	3	5
7	MF	4	(Poland)	Grzegorz Krychowiak	2	0	2	4
7	MF	10	(Spain)	José Antonio Reyes	3	0	1	4
8	FW	14	(Spain)	Iago Aspas	2	7	1	10
8	MF	19	(Argentina)	Éver Banega	3	0	0	10
9	DF	23	(Spain)	Coke	2	0	0	2
9	DF	6	(Portugal)	Daniel Carriço	1	0	1	2
10	MF	18	(Spain)	Gerard Deulofeu	1	0	0	1
10	DF	5	(Portugal)	Diogo Figueiras	1	0	0	1
10	DF	21	(Argentina)	Nicolás Pareja	1	0	0	1
10	DF	15	(France)	Timothée Kolodziejczak	1	0	0	1
TOTALS					69	6	29	104

Last updated on 5 October 2014
