= Ernest Forgàs =

Spanish footballer

Ernest Forgas
Personal information
- Full name: Ernest Forgas Pallarès
- Date of birth: 20 July 1993 (age 33)
- Place of birth: Barcelona, Spain
- Height: 1.88 m (6 ft 2 in)
- Position: Forward

Team information
- Current team: FC Vilafranca

Youth career
- 2001–2006: Barcelona
- 2006–2008: Cornellà
- 2008–2010: Jàbac Terrassa
- 2010–2011: Hospitalet
- 2011–2012: Gimnàstic

Senior career*
Years	Team	Apps	(Gls)
2012–2013	Pobla Mafumet	28	(2)
2013–2014	Rubí	34	(21)
2014–2015	Sabadell B	17	(3)
2014–2016	Sabadell	30	(4)
2016–2017	Prat	18	(2)
2017	Peralada	18	(8)
2017–2018	Reus B	40	(17)
2019–2020	Andorra	21	(9)
2020–2021	Badajoz	14	(2)
2021–2022	Talavera	13	(2)
2022–2023	Olot	34	(11)
2023–2025	Sant Andreu	21	(6)
2025–	FC Vilafranca	2	(0)
- * Club domestic league appearances and goals as of 27 September 2025

Ernest Forgas Pallarès (born 20 July 1993) is a Spanish professional footballer who plays for Lliga Elit club FC Vilafranca as a forward.

== Club career ==
Born in Barcelona, Catalonia, Forgas finished his formation with Gimnàstic de Tarragona's youth setup, and made his senior debuts with the farm team in the 2011–12 campaign, in Tercera División. On 1 August 2013 he moved to UE Rubí, in the same division.

On 16 June 2014, Forgas joined CE Sabadell FC, being assigned to the reserves also in the fourth level. On 25 October 2014, he played his first match as a professional, replacing Juanto Ortuño in the 63rd minute of a 0–1 away loss against RCD Mallorca in the Segunda División championship.

Forgas scored his first professional goal four days later, but in a 1–6 home loss against Sevilla FC for the season's Copa del Rey.
