= 2017–18 Sevilla FC season =

111th season in existence of Sevilla FC

Sevilla FC
2017–18 season
- President: José Castro Carmona
- Head coach: Eduardo Berizzo (until 22 December); Vincenzo Montella (from 28 December to 28 April); Joaquín Caparrós (caretaker, from 28 April)
- Stadium: Ramón Sánchez Pizjuán
- La Liga: 7th
- Copa del Rey: Runners-up
- UEFA Champions League: Quarter-finals
- Top goalscorer: League: Wissam Ben Yedder (9); All: Wissam Ben Yedder (22)
Home colours	Away colours	Third colours

The 2017–18 season was Sevilla FC's 111th season in existence and the club's 17th consecutive season in La Liga, the top league of Spanish football. Sevilla competed in La Liga, the Copa del Rey and the UEFA Champions League.

== Kit ==
Supplier: New Balance

== Players ==
=== Current squad ===
As of 31 January 2018.

Note: Flags indicate national team as defined under FIFA eligibility rules; some limited exceptions apply. Players may hold more than one non-FIFA nationality.

No.	Pos.	Nation	Player
1	GK	ESP	Sergio Rico
2	DF	FRA	Sébastien Corchia
3	DF	MEX	Miguel Layún (on loan from Porto)
4	DF	DEN	Simon Kjær
5	DF	FRA	Clément Lenglet
6	DF	POR	Daniel Carriço (vice-captain)
7	MF	ESP	Roque Mesa (on loan from Swansea City)
8	DF	BRA	Guilherme Arana
9	FW	FRA	Wissam Ben Yedder
10	MF	ARG	Éver Banega
11	MF	ARG	Joaquín Correa
12	MF	GER	Johannes Geis (on loan from Schalke 04)
13	GK	ESP	David Soria

No.	Pos.	Nation	Player
14	MF	ARG	Guido Pizarro
15	MF	FRA	Steven Nzonzi
16	FW	ESP	Jesús Navas
17	MF	ESP	Pablo Sarabia
18	DF	ESP	Sergio Escudero (3rd captain)
19	MF	BRA	Paulo Henrique Ganso
20	FW	COL	Luis Muriel
21	DF	ARG	Nicolás Pareja (captain)
22	MF	ITA	Franco Vázquez
23	FW	ESP	Sandro Ramírez (on loan from Everton)
24	FW	ESP	Nolito
25	DF	ARG	Gabriel Mercado
—	DF	FRA	Lionel Carole (on loan from Galatasaray)

== Transfers ==
=== In ===
No.	Pos.	Nat.	Name	Age	EU	Moving from	Type	Transfer window	Ends	Transfer fee	Source
10	MF	(Argentina)	Éver Banega	29	EU	Internazionale	Transfer	Summer		€9,000,000	
20	FW	(Colombia)	Luis Muriel	25	EU	Sampdoria	Transfer	Summer		€20,000,000	
14	MF	(Argentina)	Guido Pizarro	27	EU	UANL	Transfer	Summer		€6,000,000	
24	MF	(Spain)	Nolito	30	EU	Manchester City	Transfer	Summer		€9,000,000	
2	DF	(France)	Sébastien Corchia	26	EU	Lille	Transfer	Summer		€7,500,000	
16	MF	(Spain)	Jesús Navas	31	EU	Free agent	Transfer	Summer		Free	
4	DF	(Denmark)	Simon Kjær	28	EU	Fenerbahce	Transfer	Summer		€12,500,000	

Total spending: ▼€64,000,000

=== Out ===
No.	Pos.	Nat.	Name	Age	EU	Moving to	Type	Transfer window	Transfer fee	Source
8	MF	(Spain)	Vicente Iborra	29	EU	Leicester City	Transfer	Summer	€15,000,000	
20	MF	(Spain)	Vitolo	27	EU	Atlético Madrid	Transfer	Summer	€35,600,000	
23	DF	(France)	Adil Rami	31	EU	Marseille	Transfer	Summer	€6,000,000	
3	DF	(Brazil)	Mariano	31	EU	Galatasaray	Transfer	Summer	€4,500,000	
7	MF	(Denmark)	Michael Krohn-Dehli	34	EU	Deportivo La Coruña	Transfer	Summer	Free transfer	

Total income: ▲€61,100,000

Net: ▼€2,900,000

== Pre-season and friendlies ==
=== Summer ===
Win Draw Loss Cancelled

17 July 2017 1	Cerezo Osaka	1–3	Sevilla	Higashisumiyoshi-ku, Osaka, Japan
11:00 CEST (UTC+02:00)	Fukumitsu 80'		Ben Yedder 42', 55'; Muriel 90+1'	Stadium: Kincho Stadium

22 July 2017 2017 J.League World Challenge	Kashima Antlers	2–0	Sevilla	Kashima, Ibaraki Japan
11:00 CEST (UTC+02:00)	Suzuki 72', 90+1'	Report	Banega (yellow card) 43'; Matos (yellow card) 71'	Stadium: Kashima Soccer Stadium; Attendance: 28,308; Referee: Minoru Tōjō (Japan)

29 July 2017 2017 Emirates Cup	RB Leipzig	0–1	Sevilla	London, England
14:00 BST	Keïta (yellow card) 66'; Poulsen (yellow card) 79'; Orban (yellow card) 90'		Ben Yedder 35' (pen.); Lasso (yellow card) 64'; Corchia (yellow card) 86'	Stadium: Emirates Stadium; Referee: Stuart Attwell (England)

30 July 2017 2017 Emirates Cup	Arsenal	1–2	Sevilla	London, England
16:20 BST	Lacazette 62'		Escudero (yellow card) 43'; Correa 49'; Nzonzi 69'; Krohn-Delhi (yellow card) 87'	Stadium: Emirates Stadium; Referee: Andre Marriner (England)

5 August 2017 5	Southampton	2–0	Sevilla	Southampton, England
15:00 BST	Stephens 26'; Gabbiadini 82'			Stadium: St Mary's Stadium

6 August 2017 6	Everton	2–2	Sevilla	Liverpool, England
15:00 BST	Sandro 1'; Mirallas 81' (pen.)		Banega 58', 61' (pen.)	Stadium: Goodison Park

10 August 2017 Antonio Puerta Trophy	Sevilla	2–1	Roma	Seville, Spain
	Correa (yellow card) 25'; Corchia (yellow card) 67'; Escudero 73'; Nolito 90'		Strootman (yellow card) 58'; Džeko (yellow card) 89', (goal) 90+1'	Stadium: Ramón Sánchez Pizjuán; Attendance: 29,298

== Competitions ==
Win Draw Loss

=== Overall ===
Competition	First match	Last match	Starting round	Final position	Record							
Competition	First match	Last match	Starting round	Final position	Pld	W	D	L	GF	GA	GD	Win %
La Liga	20 August 2017	19 May 2018	Matchday 1	7th	38	17	7	14	49	58	−9	44.74
Copa del Rey	24 October 2017	21 April 2018	Round of 32	Runners-up	9	7	1	1	19	9	+10	77.78
Champions League	16 August 2017	11 April 2018	Play-off round	Quarter-finals	12	4	6	2	19	18	+1	33.33
Total					59	28	14	17	87	85	+2	47.46

Last updated: 19 May 2018
Source: Competitions

=== Overview ===
Competition	Record							
Competition	Pld	W	D	L	GF	GA	GD	Win %
La Liga	38	17	7	14	49	58	−9	44.74
Copa del Rey	9	7	1	1	19	9	+10	77.78
Champions League	12	4	6	2	19	18	+1	33.33
Total	59	28	14	17	87	85	+2	47.46

Updated to match played 19 May 2018
Source: Competitions

=== La Liga ===
==== League table ====
Pos	Team	Pld	W	D	L	GF	GA	GD	Pts	Qualification or relegation
5	Villarreal	38	18	7	13	57	50	+7	61	Qualification for the Europa League group stage (Note: Since the winners of the 2017–18 Copa del Rey, Barcelona, qualified for European competition based on league position, the spot awarded to the cup winners (Europa League group stage) was passed to the sixth-placed team and the spot awarded to the sixth-placed team (Europa League second qualifying round) was passed to the seventh-placed team.)
6	Real Betis	38	18	6	14	60	61	−1	60	Qualification for the Europa League group stage
7	Sevilla	38	17	7	14	49	58	−9	58	Qualification for the Europa League second qualifying round
8	Getafe	38	15	10	13	42	33	+9	55	
9	Eibar	38	14	9	15	44	50	−6	51 (Note: Eibar finished ahead of Girona on head-to-head points: Eibar 4–1 Girona, Girona 1–4 Eibar.)	

Source: La Liga, Soccerway
Rules for classification: 1) Points; 2) Head-to-head points; 3) Head-to-head goal difference; 4) Goal difference; 5) Goals scored; 6) Fair-play points (Note: Head-to-head record is used only after all the matches between the teams in question have been played)

==== Results summary ====
Overall								Home						Away					
Pld	W	D	L	GF	GA	GD	Pts	W	D	L	GF	GA	GD	W	D	L	GF	GA	GD
38	17	7	14	49	58	−9	58	11	5	3	31	22	+9	6	2	11	18	36	−18

Last updated: 19 May 2018.
Source: Competitive matches

==== Results by round ====
Round	1	2	3	4	5	6	7	8	9	10	11	12	13	14	15	16	17	18	19	20	21	22	23	24	25	26	27	28	29	30	31	32	33	34	35	36	37	38
Ground	H	A	H	A	H	A	H	A	A	H	A	H	A	H	A	H	A	H	A	A	H	A	H	A	H	A	H	H	A	H	A	H	A	H	A	H	A	H
Result	D	W	W	W	W	L	W	L	L	W	L	W	W	W	L	D	L	L	L	W	D	L	W	W	L	W	W	L	L	D	L	D	D	W	L	W	D	W
Position	11	9	3	2	2	3	2	5	8	5	6	5	5	5	5	5	5	5	6	6	6	6	6	5	6	5	5	5	6	7	7	7	7	7	7	7	7	7

Updated to match(es) played on 19 May 2018. Source: Competitive matches
A = Away; H = Home; W = Win; D = Draw; L = Loss

==== Matches ====
19 August 2017 1	Sevilla	1–1	Espanyol	Seville
22:15 CEST (UTC+02:00)	Lenglet 26'; Banega (yellow card) 84' (red card) 84'; Nolito (yellow card) 90'	Report	Diop (yellow card) 16'; Baptistão 35', (yellow card) 55'; Martín (yellow card) 76'; David López (yellow card) 90+1'	Stadium: Ramón Sánchez Pizjuán; Attendance: 30,506; Referee: Alejandro Hernández Hernández

27 August 2017 2	Getafe	0–1	Sevilla	Getafe
20:15 CEST (UTC+02:00)		Report	Sarabia (yellow card) 75'; Ganso 83'	Stadium: Coliseum Alfonso Pérez; Attendance: 10,039; Referee: Alberto Undiano Mallenco

9 September 2017 3	Sevilla	3–0	Eibar	Seville
18:30 CEST (UTC+02:00)	Escudero (yellow card) 3'; Ganso 46'; Ben Yedder 76'; Nolito 90+2'	Report	José Ángel (yellow card) 30'	Stadium: Ramón Sánchez Pizjuán; Attendance: 32,469; Referee: Antonio Mateu Lahoz

17 September 2017 4	Girona	0–1	Sevilla	Girona
16:15 CEST (UTC+02:00)	Juanpe (yellow card) 25'; Bernardo (yellow card) 57'	Report	Nzonzi (yellow card) 21'; Corchia (yellow card) 45'; Muriel 69'; Carriço (yellow card) 71'; Lenglet (yellow card) 85'; Vázquez (yellow card) 90'	Stadium: Montilivi; Attendance: 11,032; Referee: Ricardo de Burgos Bengoetxea

20 September 2017 5	Sevilla	1–0	Las Palmas	Seville
22:00 CEST (UTC+02:00)	Mercado (yellow card) 44'; Navas 84', (yellow card) 89'	Report	García (yellow card) 1'; Momo (yellow card) 76'	Stadium: Ramón Sánchez Pizjuán; Attendance: 35,317; Referee: José González González

23 September 2017 6	Atlético Madrid	2–0	Sevilla	Madrid
13:00 CEST (UTC+02:00)	Gabi (yellow card) 28'; Carrasco 46', (yellow card) 47'; Vrsaljko (yellow card) 67'; Griezmann 69'; Á. Correa (yellow card) 76'	Report	Muriel (yellow card) 49'; Mercado (yellow card) 53'; Lenglet (yellow card) 84'	Stadium: Wanda Metropolitano; Attendance: 60,823; Referee: Juan Martínez Munuera

30 September 2017 7	Sevilla	2–0	Málaga	Seville
16:15 CEST (UTC+02:00)	Banega 68' (pen.); Muriel 70'; Mercado (yellow card) 79'; Kjær (yellow card) 79'	Report	Rolón (yellow card) 45'	Stadium: Ramón Sánchez Pizjuán; Attendance: 34,430; Referee: Daniel Trujillo Suárez

14 October 2017 8	Athletic Bilbao	1–0	Sevilla	Bilbao
13:00 CEST (UTC+02:00)	Aduriz (yellow card) 13'; Córdoba (yellow card) 33'; Núñez (yellow card) 37'; Vesga 43', (yellow card) 85'; Laporte (yellow card) 90+8'	Report	Lenglet (yellow card) 53'; Correa (yellow card) 68'; Vázquez (yellow card) 79'; Pizarro (yellow card) 90+5'; Muriel (yellow card) 90+8'	Stadium: San Mamés; Attendance: 40,197; Referee: Ignacio Iglesias Villanueva

21 October 2017 9	Valencia	4–0	Sevilla	Valencia
18:30 CEST (UTC+02:00)	Guedes 43', 90+2'; Zaza 51', (yellow card) 60'; Mina 85'; Parejo (yellow card) 88'	Report	Nolito (yellow card) 9'; Lenglet (yellow card) 14'; Pizarro (yellow card) 27'; Corchia (yellow card) 37'	Stadium: Mestalla; Attendance: 44,307; Referee: Xavier Estrada Fernández

28 October 2017 10	Sevilla	2–1	Leganés	Seville
22:30 CEST (UTC+02:00)	Ben Yedder 20'; Sarabia 54'	Report	Pérez (yellow card) 30'; Alexander 48' (pen.); Gabriel (yellow card) 67'; Naranjo (yellow card) 84'	Stadium: Ramón Sánchez Pizjuán; Attendance: 32,097; Referee: David Medié Jiménez

4 November 2017 11	Barcelona	2–1	Sevilla	Barcelona
20:45 CET (UTC+01:00)	Alcácer 23', 65'; Messi (yellow card) 90+4'	Report	Pizarro 59'	Stadium: Camp Nou; Attendance: 69,069; Referee: José Luis González González

18 November 2017 12	Sevilla	2–1	Celta Vigo	Seville
18:30 CET (UTC+01:00)	Corchia (yellow card) 19'; Muriel 36'; Nolito 48'; Pizarro (yellow card) 86'; Soria (yellow card) 90+3'	Report	M. Gómez 13'; Aspas (yellow card) 62'; Jonny (yellow card) 89'	Stadium: Ramón Sánchez Pizjuán; Attendance: 35,030; Referee: Carlos del Cerro Grande

26 November 2017 13	Villarreal	2–3	Sevilla	Villarreal
18:30 CET (UTC+01:00)	Bakambu 19'; Ruiz (yellow card) 23' (yellow-red card) 77'; Bacca 53'; Guerra (yellow card) 55'; Costa (yellow card) 90+2'	Report	Lenglet 56'; Vázquez 57'; Pizarro (yellow card) 66'; Banega (yellow card) 72', (goal) 78' (pen.); Correa (yellow card) 86'	Stadium: Estadio de la Cerámica; Attendance: 18,698; Referee: Javier Alberola Rojas

2 December 2017 14	Sevilla	2–0	Deportivo La Coruña	Seville
18:30 CET (UTC+01:00)	Escudero (yellow card) 38'; Ben Yedder 45'; Krohn-Dehli 78'	Report	Cartabia (yellow card) 31'; Sidnei (yellow card) 73'; Pérez (yellow card) 86'	Stadium: Ramón Sánchez Pizjuán; Attendance: 32,017; Referee: José María Sánchez Martínez

9 December 2017 15	Real Madrid	5–0	Sevilla	Madrid
18:30 CET (UTC+01:00)	Nacho 3'; Ronaldo 23', 31' (pen.); Kroos 38'; Hakimi 42'	Report	J. Navas (yellow card) 31'; Banega (yellow card) 37'	Stadium: Santiago Bernabéu; Attendance: 76,924; Referee: Juan Martínez Munuera

15 December 2017 16	Sevilla	0–0	Levante	Seville
21:00 CET (UTC+01:00)	Lenglet (yellow card) 72'; Vázquez (yellow card) 76'	Report	Campaña (yellow card) 47'; Lukić (yellow card) 50'; Luna (yellow card) 60'	Stadium: Ramón Sánchez Pizjuán; Attendance: 25,803; Referee: Ignacio Iglesias Villanueva

20 December 2017 17	Real Sociedad	3–1	Sevilla	San Sebastián
21:30 CET (UTC+01:00)	I. Martínez 17'; R. Navas (yellow card) 68'; Zubeldia 76'; Vela 90'	Report	Ben Yedder (yellow card) 39', (goal) 44'; Pizarro (yellow card) 51'; Corchia (yellow card) 57'; Vázquez (yellow card) 86'; Kjær (yellow card) 87'	Stadium: Anoeta; Attendance: 17,205; Referee: Alejandro Hernández Hernández

6 January 2018 18	Sevilla	3–5	Real Betis	Seville
20:45 CET (UTC+01:00)	Ben Yedder 13'; Banega (yellow card) 25'; Kjær 40'; Lenglet 67', (yellow card) 80'; Escudero (yellow card) 73'	Report	Fabián 1'; Feddal 21', (yellow card) 66'; Francis (yellow card) 33'; Durmisi 63'; León 65', (yellow card) 80'; Mandi (yellow card) 68'; Tello (yellow card) 86', (goal) 90+5'; Adán (yellow card) 90'	Stadium: Ramón Sánchez Pizjuán; Attendance: 40,282; Referee: Jesús Gil Manzano

14 January 2018 19	Alavés	1–0	Sevilla	Vitoria-Gasteiz
16:15 CET (UTC+01:00)	Duarte (yellow card) 24' (yellow-red card) 83'; García 52', (yellow card) 90+2'; Pina (yellow card) 55'; Ely (yellow card) 90+3'	Report	Lenglet (yellow card) 65'; Kjær (yellow card) 72'	Stadium: Mendizorrotza; Attendance: 19,413; Referee: José María Sánchez Martínez

20 January 2018 20	Espanyol	0–3	Sevilla	Cornellà de Llobregat
13:00 CET (UTC+01:00)	Fuego (yellow card) 32'; Baptistão (yellow card) 41'; López (yellow card) 54'; Sánchez (yellow card) 85'	Report	Vázquez 15'; Sarabia 34'; Mercado (yellow card) 71'; Escudero (yellow card) 83'; Muriel 90'	Stadium: RCDE Stadium; Attendance: 19,607; Referee: Alberto Undiano Mallenco

28 January 2018 21	Sevilla	1–1	Getafe	Seville
18:30 CET (UTC+01:00)	Muriel 72'; Mercado (yellow card) 76'; Rico (yellow card) 90+3'; Nolito (yellow card) 90+3'	Report	Cala (yellow card) 64'; Bruno (yellow card) 69'; Mora (yellow card) 74'; Ángel 90+3'	Stadium: Ramón Sánchez Pizjuán; Attendance: 34,011; Referee: Javier Alberola Rojas

3 February 2018 22	Eibar	5–1	Sevilla	Eibar
13:00 CET (UTC+01:00)	Kike 1'; Orellana 17', 61'; Ramis 32'; Arbilla 83'	Report	Sarabia 21' (pen.); Pareja (yellow card) 40'; Mesa (yellow card) 47'; Banega (yellow card) 67'	Stadium: Ipurua; Attendance: 5,311; Referee: Daniel Jesús Trujillo Suárez

11 February 2018 23	Sevilla	1–0	Girona	Seville
12:00 CET (UTC+01:00)	Muriel (yellow card) 40'; Pizarro (yellow card) 43'; Sarabia 46'	Report	García (yellow card) 43'; Aday (yellow card) 45'	Stadium: Ramón Sánchez Pizjuán; Attendance: 33,129; Referee: Santiago Jaime Latre

17 February 2018 24	Las Palmas	1–2	Sevilla	Las Palmas
13:00 CET (UTC+01:00)	Peñalba (yellow card) 24'; Calleri 82' (pen.); Viera (yellow card) 90+4'	Report	Pizarro (yellow card) 29'; Ben Yedder 35'; Sarabia 50'; Lenglet (yellow card) 72'; Mesa (yellow card) 90'	Stadium: Estadio Gran Canaria; Attendance: 19,161; Referee: Ignacio Iglesias Villanueva

25 February 2018 25	Sevilla	2–5	Atlético Madrid	Seville
20:45 CET (UTC+01:00)	J. Correa (yellow card) 32'; Escudero (yellow card) 68'; Vázquez (yellow card) 70'; Sarabia 85'; Nolito 89'	Report	Costa (yellow card) 28', (goal) 29'; Griezmann 42', 51' (pen.), 81'; Giménez (yellow card) 47'; Koke 65'; Saúl (yellow card) 90+1'	Stadium: Ramón Sánchez Pizjuán; Attendance: 37,884; Referee: Juan Martínez Munuera

28 February 2018 26	Málaga	0–1	Sevilla	Málaga
19:30 CET (UTC+01:00)	Ideye (yellow card) 44'; Rosales (yellow card) 65'	Report	Layún (yellow card) 12'; Correa 15'; Sarabia (yellow card) 67'	Stadium: La Rosaleda; Attendance: 15,516; Referee: Carlos del Cerro Grande

3 March 2018 27	Sevilla	2–0	Athletic Bilbao	Seville
16:15 CET (UTC+01:00)	Muriel 27'; Vázquez 32'; Nolito (yellow card) 75'; Correa (yellow card) 83'	Report	Saborit (yellow card) 64'; San José (yellow card) 79'; I. Martínez (yellow card) 83'	Stadium: Ramón Sánchez Pizjuán; Attendance: 25,185; Referee: Alberto Undiano Mallenco

10 March 2018 28	Sevilla	0–2	Valencia	Seville
16:15 CET (UTC+01:00)	Escudero (yellow card) 35'; Muriel (yellow card) 40'; Mercado (yellow card) 40'; Correa (yellow card) 82'	Report	Rodrigo 25', 68'; Kondogbia (yellow card) 60'; Garay (yellow card) 87'	Stadium: Ramón Sánchez Pizjuán; Attendance: 33,287; Referee: Ricardo de Burgos Bengoetxea

18 March 2018 29	Leganés	2–1	Sevilla	Leganés
12:00 CET (UTC+01:00)	Bustinza 41'; Amrabat (yellow card) 65'; Eraso 69'; Siovas (yellow card) 77'	Report	Escudero (yellow card) 40'; Sarabia (yellow card) 73' (yellow-red card) 84'; Nzonzi (yellow card) 80'; Layún 90'	Stadium: Butarque; Attendance: 10,037; Referee: Javier Alberola Rojas

31 March 2018 30	Sevilla	2–2	Barcelona	Seville
20:45 CEST (UTC+02:00)	Mercado (yellow card) 34'; Vázquez 36'; Rico (yellow card) 44'; Muriel 50'	Report	L. Suárez 88'; Messi 89'	Stadium: Ramón Sánchez Pizjuán; Attendance: 37,588; Referee: José Luis González González

7 April 2018 31	Celta Vigo	4–0	Sevilla	Vigo
16:15 CEST (UTC+02:00)	Jonny (yellow card) 12'; Arana 38' (o.g.); Aspas 57', 60', 78'	Report	Pizarro (yellow card) 21'; Banega (yellow card) 82'	Stadium: Balaídos; Attendance: 16,919; Referee: Alfonso Javier Álvarez Izquierdo

14 April 2018 32	Sevilla	2–2	Villarreal	Seville
13:00 CEST (UTC+02:00)	Banega (yellow card) 37'; Sarabia (yellow card) 51'; Ben Yedder (yellow card) 62' (yellow-red card) 62'; Nolito 78'; Nzonzi 82'; Escudero (yellow card) 87'	Report	Cheryshev (yellow card) 22'; Raba 36'; Costa (yellow card) 55' (yellow-red card) 76'; Bacca 68'	Stadium: Ramón Sánchez Pizjuán; Attendance: 32,192; Referee: Pablo González Fuertes

17 April 2018 33	Deportivo La Coruña	0–0	Sevilla	A Coruña
19:30 CEST (UTC+02:00)		Report	Banega (yellow card) 11'; Layún (yellow card) 74'	Stadium: Abanca-Riazor; Attendance: 24,374; Referee: David Medié Jiménez

27 April 2018 35	Levante	2–1	Sevilla	Valencia
21:00 CEST (UTC+02:00)	Roger 11'; Morales 74'; Luna (yellow card) 77'	Report	Fernández 16'; Sarabia (yellow card) 87'	Stadium: Ciutat de València; Attendance: 17,240; Referee: José Luis González González

4 May 2018 36	Sevilla	1–0	Real Sociedad	Seville
21:00 CEST (UTC+02:00)	Layún (yellow card) 32'; Banega 47' (pen.), (yellow card) 70'; Sarabia (yellow card) 87'; Mercado (yellow card) 90+3'	Report	Zurutuza (yellow card) 54'; Willian José (yellow card) 90+5'	Stadium: Ramón Sánchez Pizjuán; Attendance: 34,733; Referee: Santiago Jaime Latre

9 May 2018 34	Sevilla	3–2	Real Madrid	Seville
21:30 CEST (UTC+02:00)	Ben Yedder 26'; Mercado (yellow card) 42'; Layún 45'; Pizarro (yellow card) 69'; Ramos 84' (o.g.); Escudero (yellow card) 90+5'	Report	Ramos (yellow card) 83', (goal) 90+5' (pen.); Mayoral 87'	Stadium: Ramón Sánchez Pizjuán; Attendance: 38,524; Referee: Antonio Mateu Lahoz
Note: The match, originally scheduled for 22 April 2018, was moved back because of the involvement of Sevilla at the 2018 Copa del Rey Final.

12 May 2018 37	Real Betis	2–2	Sevilla	Seville
18:30 CEST (UTC+02:00)	Bartra 5'; Guardado (yellow card) 17'; Loren 81'	Report	Sarabia (yellow card) 20'; Lenglet (yellow card) 24'; Ben Yedder 57'; Escudero (yellow card) 71'; Kjær 79'; Layún (yellow card) 90'	Stadium: Benito Villamarín; Referee: Alfonso Javier Álvarez Izquierdo

19 May 2018 38	Sevilla	1–0	Alavés	Seville
18:30 CEST (UTC+02:00)	Ben Yedder 28'; Pareja (yellow card) 71'; Sarabia (yellow card) 81'	Report	Diéguez (yellow card) 75'; Torres (yellow card) 84'	Stadium: Ramón Sánchez Pizjuán; Attendance: 22,513; Referee: Carlos del Cerro Grande

=== Copa del Rey ===
==== Matches ====
===== Round of 32 =====
25 October 2017 First leg	Cartagena	0–3	Sevilla	Cartagena
19:30		Report	Sarabia 25'; Correa 35'; Muriel 51'	Stadium: Cartagonova; Attendance: 7,750; Referee: Daniel Jesús Trujillo Suárez

29 November 2017 Second leg	Sevilla	4–0 (7–0 agg.)	Cartagena	Seville
19:30	Ben Yedder 3', 6'; Ganso 42'; Correa 66'	Report	Morales (yellow card) 83'	Stadium: Ramón Sánchez Pizjuán; Attendance: 11,678; Referee: Alejandro Hernández Hernández

===== Round of 16 =====
3 January 2018 First leg	Cádiz	0–2	Sevilla	Cádiz
21:00	Villanueva (yellow card) 1'; Marcos Mauro (yellow card) 30'; García (yellow card) 47'	Report	Kjær (yellow card) 2'; Nolito 9'; Navas 23'; Lenglet (yellow card) 39'	Stadium: Ramón de Carranza; Attendance: 17,692; Referee: Antonio Mateu Lahoz

11 January 2018 Second leg	Sevilla	2–1 (4–1 agg.)	Cádiz	Seville
19:30	Ben Yedder 31'; Correa 54'	Report	Oliván (yellow card) 26'; González (yellow card) 74'; García 86'	Stadium: Ramón Sánchez Pizjuán; Attendance: 23,510; Referee: Ricardo de Burgos Bengoetxea

===== Quarter-finals =====
17 January 2018 First leg	Atlético Madrid	1–2	Sevilla	Madrid
19:00	Saúl (yellow card) 69'; Costa 73'	Report	Mercado (yellow card) 58'; Navas 80'; J. Correa 88'	Stadium: Wanda Metropolitano; Attendance: 51,643; Referee: Santiago Jaime Latre

23 January 2018 Second leg	Sevilla	3–1 (5–2 agg.)	Atlético Madrid	Seville
21:30	Escudero 1'; Banega (yellow card) 27', (goal) 48' (pen.); Vázquez (yellow card) 54'; Navas (yellow card) 63'; Sarabia 79'; Mercado (yellow card) 90'	Report	Griezmann 13'; Giménez (yellow card) 18'; Gabi (yellow card) 54'; Á. Correa (yellow card) 57'; Torres (yellow card) 84'	Stadium: Ramón Sánchez Pizjuán; Attendance: 39,918; Referee: Juan Martínez Munuera

===== Semi-finals =====
31 January 2018 First leg	Leganés	1–1	Sevilla	Leganés
21:30	Brašanac (yellow card) 23'; Siovas 56'; Omar (yellow card) 88'	Report	Muriel 21'; Escudero (yellow card) 47'; Vázquez (yellow card) 65'; Lenglet (yellow card) 73'; Sarabia (yellow card) 86'	Stadium: Butarque; Attendance: 11,454; Referee: José Luis González González

7 February 2018 Second leg	Sevilla	2–0 (3–1 agg.)	Leganés	Seville
21:30	Correa 15'; Vázquez 89'	Report	Amrabat (yellow card) 50'	Stadium: Ramón Sánchez Pizjuán; Attendance: 39,705; Referee: Xavier Estrada Fernández

===== Final =====
21 April 2018 Final	Sevilla	0–5	Barcelona	Madrid
21:30	Mercado (yellow card) 34'; Escudero (yellow card) 38'; Vázquez (yellow card) 74'	Report	L. Suárez 14', 40'; Messi 31'; Iniesta 52', (yellow card) 67'; Coutinho 69' (pen.); Busquets (yellow card) 74'	Stadium: Wanda Metropolitano; Attendance: 67,500; Referee: Jesús Gil Manzano

=== UEFA Champions League ===
==== Play-off round ====
16 August 2017 First leg	İstanbul Başakşehir (Turkey)	1–2	(Spain) Sevilla	Istanbul, Turkey
20:45 CEST	Elia 64'; Belözoğlu (yellow card) 67'	Report	Escudero 16'; Mercado (yellow card) 29'; Pizarro (yellow card) 55'; Ben Yedder 84'	Stadium: Başakşehir Fatih Terim Stadium; Attendance: 12,894; Referee: Clément Turpin (France)

22 August 2017 Second leg	Sevilla (Spain)	2–2 (4–3 agg.)	(Turkey) İstanbul Başakşehir	Seville, Spain
20:45 CEST	Escudero 52'; Pareja (yellow card) 66'; Correa (yellow card) 69'; Ben Yedder 75'; Lenglet (yellow card) 89'	Report	Elia 17'; Epureanu (yellow card) 49'; Mossoró (yellow card) 61'; Višća 83'	Stadium: Ramón Sánchez Pizjuán; Attendance: 34,278; Referee: Willie Collum (Scotland)

==== Group stage ====
Pos	Team	Pld	W	D	L	GF	GA	GD	Pts	Qualification	LIV	SEV	SPM	MRB
1	(England) Liverpool	6	3	3	0	23	6	+17	12	Advance to knockout phase	—	2–2	7–0	3–0
2	(Spain) Sevilla	6	2	3	1	12	12	0	9	Advance to knockout phase	3–3	—	2–1	3–0
3	(Russia) Spartak Moscow	6	1	3	2	9	13	−4	6	Transfer to Europa League	1–1	5–1	—	1–1
4	(Slovenia) Maribor	6	0	3	3	3	16	−13	3		0–7	1–1	1–1	—

Source: UEFA
Rules for classification: Group stage tiebreakers

13 September 2017 1	Liverpool (England)	2–2	(Spain) Sevilla	Liverpool, England
20:45	Firmino 21'; Salah 37'; Moreno (yellow card) 39'; Gomez (yellow card) 64' (yellow-red card) 90+3'	Report	Ben Yedder 5'; Mercado (yellow card) 35'; Pareja (yellow card) 42'; Banega (yellow card) 45+3'; Correa 72'	Stadium: Anfield; Attendance: 52,332; Referee: Danny Makkelie (Germany)

26 September 2017 2	Sevilla (Spain)	3–0	(Slovenia) Maribor	Seville, Spain
20:45	Ben Yedder 27', 38', 83' (pen.); Escudero (yellow card) 56'	Report		Stadium: Ramón Sánchez Pizjuán; Attendance: 34,705; Referee: Aleksei Kulbakov (Belarus)

17 October 2017 3	Spartak Moscow (Russia)	5–1	(Spain) Sevilla	Moscow, Russia
20:45	Promes 18', 90'; Dzhikiya (yellow card) 34'; Fernando (yellow card) 45'; Melgarejo 58'; Glushakov 67'; Luiz Adriano 74'	Report	Kjær 30'; Escudero (yellow card) 37'; Pizarro (yellow card) 89'	Stadium: Otkrytiye Arena; Attendance: 44,307; Referee: Gianluca Rocchi (Italy)

1 November 2017 4	Sevilla (Spain)	2–1	(Russia) Spartak Moscow	Seville, Spain
20:45	Lenglet 30'; Banega 59'; Ben Yedder (yellow card) 90+1'	Report	Glushakov (yellow card) 32'; Tasci (yellow card) 61'; Zé Luís 78'; Dzhikiya (yellow card) 86'	Stadium: Ramón Sánchez Pizjuán; Attendance: 38,002; Referee: Artur Soares Dias (Portugal)

21 November 2017 5	Sevilla (Spain)	3–3	(England) Liverpool	Seville, Spain
20:45	Banega (yellow card) 45'; Mercado (yellow card) 54'; Ben Yedder 51', 60' (pen.); Pizarro 90+3'	Report	Firmino 2', 30'; Mané 22'; Moreno (yellow card) 38'; Henderson (yellow card) 68'; Can (yellow card) 82'	Stadium: Ramón Sánchez Pizjuán; Attendance: 39,495; Referee: Felix Brych (Germany)

6 December 2017 6	Maribor (Slovenia)	1–1	(Spain) Sevilla	Maribor, Slovenia
20:45	Tavares 10'; Pihler (yellow card) 35'; Bohar (yellow card) 50'; Milec (yellow card) 77'	Report	Ganso 75'	Stadium: Ljudski vrt Attendance: 11,976; Referee: Ovidiu Hațegan (Romania)

==== Knockout phase ====
===== Round of 16 =====
21 February 2018 First leg	Sevilla (Spain)	0–0	(England) Manchester United	Seville, Spain
20:45 CET (UTC+01:00)	Nzonzi (yellow card) 21'	Report	Sánchez (yellow card) 41'	Stadium: Ramón Sánchez Pizjuán; Attendance: 39,725; Referee: Clément Turpin (France)

13 March 2018 Second leg	Manchester United (England)	1–2 (1–2 agg.)	(Spain) Sevilla	Manchester, England
20:45 CET (UTC+01:00)	Lukaku 84'; Rashford (yellow card) 90+3'	Report	Banega (yellow card) 5'; Ben Yedder 74', 78', (yellow card) 78'; Correa (yellow card) 88'; Sarabia (yellow card) 90'	Stadium: Old Trafford; Attendance: 74,909; Referee: Danny Makkelie (Netherlands)

===== Quarter-finals =====
3 April 2018 First leg	Sevilla (Spain)	1–2	(Germany) Bayern Munich	Seville, Spain
20:45 CEST (UTC+02:00)	Correa (yellow card) 15'; Sarabia 31'; Pizarro (yellow card) 90'	Report	Ribéry (yellow card) 13'; Bernat (yellow card) 34'; Navas 37' (o.g.); Thiago 68'; Müller (yellow card) 85'	Stadium: Ramón Sánchez Pizjuán; Attendance: 40,635; Referee: Daniele Orsato (Italy)

11 April 2018 Second leg	Bayern Munich (Germany)	0–0 (2–1 agg.)	(Spain) Sevilla	Munich, Germany
20:45 CEST (UTC+02:00)	Wagner (yellow card) 90+3'	Report	Mercado (yellow card) 2'; Nzonzi (yellow card) 11'; Banega (yellow card) 81'; Correa (red card) 90+2'	Stadium: Allianz Arena; Attendance: 70,000; Referee: Willie Collum (Scotland)

== Statistics ==
=== Appearances and goals ===
Last updated on 20 May 2018.

No.	Pos	Nat	Player	Total		La Liga		Copa del Rey		Champions League	
No.	Pos	Nat	Player	Apps	Goals	Apps	Goals	Apps	Goals	Apps	Goals
Goalkeepers
1	GK	(Spain) ESP	Sergio Rico	40	0	23+1	0	6	0	10	0
13	GK	(Spain) ESP	David Soria	20	0	15	0	3	0	2	0
32	GK	(Spain) ESP	Juan Soriano	0	0	0	0	0	0	0	0
Defenders
2	DF	(France) FRA	Sébastien Corchia	20	0	9+3	0	5	0	1+2	0
3	DF	(Mexico) MEX	Miguel Layún	18	2	11+5	2	0+2	0	0	0
4	DF	(Denmark) DEN	Simon Kjær	27	3	18+2	2	1	0	6	1
5	DF	(France) FRA	Clément Lenglet	54	4	33+2	3	8	0	11	1
6	DF	(Portugal) POR	Daniel Carriço	6	0	5+1	0	0	0	0	0
8	DF	(Brazil) BRA	Guilherme Arana	3	0	2+1	0	0	0	0	0
18	DF	(Spain) ESP	Sergio Escudero	45	3	26+1	0	6	1	12	2
21	DF	(Argentina) ARG	Nicolás Pareja	9	0	5	0	0	0	4	0
25	DF	(Argentina) ARG	Gabriel Mercado	43	0	25+1	0	7	0	10	0
—	DF	(France) FRA	Lionel Carole	9	0	6	0	3	0	0	0
Midfielders
7	MF	(Spain) ESP	Roque Mesa	7	0	4+3	0	0	0	0	0
10	MF	(Argentina) ARG	Éver Banega	50	5	25+6	3	7+1	1	11	1
11	MF	(Argentina) ARG	Joaquín Correa	39	7	15+6	1	7+1	5	9+1	1
12	MF	(Germany) GER	Johannes Geis	20	0	7+7	0	3+1	0	1+1	0
14	MF	(Argentina) ARG	Guido Pizarro	40	2	19+5	1	1+4	0	8+3	1
15	MF	(France) FRA	Steven Nzonzi	44	1	26+1	1	7	0	10	0
16	MF	(Spain) ESP	Jesús Navas	44	3	20+6	1	6+2	2	5+5	0
17	MF	(Spain) ESP	Pablo Sarabia	53	9	27+7	6	7+1	2	8+3	1
19	MF	(Brazil) BRA	Ganso	11	4	7+1	2	2	1	0+1	1
22	MF	(Italy) ITA	Franco Vázquez	44	5	22+8	4	5+2	1	5+2	0
23	MF	(Spain) ESP	Sandro Ramírez	18	0	7+6	0	0+2	0	0+3	0
36	MF	(Spain) ESP	José Alonso	1	0	0+1	0	0	0	0	0
Forwards
9	FW	(France) FRA	Wissam Ben Yedder	42	22	18+7	9	3+3	3	10+1	10
20	FW	(Colombia) COL	Luis Muriel	46	9	17+12	7	6+3	2	2+6	0
24	FW	(Spain) ESP	Nolito	42	5	17+13	4	2+3	1	4+3	0
30	FW	(Spain) ESP	Carlos Fernández	2	1	2	1	0	0	0	0
Players who have made an appearance or had a squad number this season but have left the club
7	MF	(Denmark) DEN	Michael Krohn-Dehli	19	1	5+8	1	2	0	2+2	0
8	MF	(Argentina) ARG	Walter Montoya	3	0	1	0	0	0	1+1	0
Out on loan
23	MF	(Spain) ESP	Borja Lasso	3	0	1	0	2	0	0	0

=== Cards ===
Accounts for all competitions. Last updated on 22 December 2017.

No.	Pos.	Name	Yellow card	Red card
2	DF	(France) Sébastien Corchia	4	0
4	DF	(Denmark) Simon Kjær	2	0
5	DF	(France) Clément Lenglet	6	0
6	DF	(Portugal) Daniel Carriço	1	0
9	FW	(France) Wissam Ben Yedder	2	0
10	MF	(Argentina) Éver Banega	4	1
11	MF	(Argentina) Joaquín Correa	2	0
13	GK	(Spain) David Soria	1	0
14	MF	(Argentina) Guido Pizarro	7	0
15	MF	(France) Steven Nzonzi	1	0
16	FW	(Spain) Jesús Navas	2	0
17	MF	(Spain) Pablo Sarabia	1	0
18	DF	(Spain) Sergio Escudero	4	0
20	FW	(Colombia) Luis Muriel	2	0
21	DF	(Portugal) Nicolas Pareja	2	0
22	MF	(Italy) Franco Vázquez	4	0
24	FW	(Spain) Nolito	2	0
25	DF	(Argentina) Gabriel Mercado	6	0

=== Clean sheets ===
Last updated on 22 December 2017.

Number	Nation	Name	Matches Played	La Liga	Copa del Rey	Champions League	TOTAL
1	(Spain)	Sergio Rico	18	4	0	1	5
13	(Spain)	David Soria	9	2	2	0	4
TOTALS				6	2	1	9
