= Sergio Rico =

Spanish footballer (born 1993)

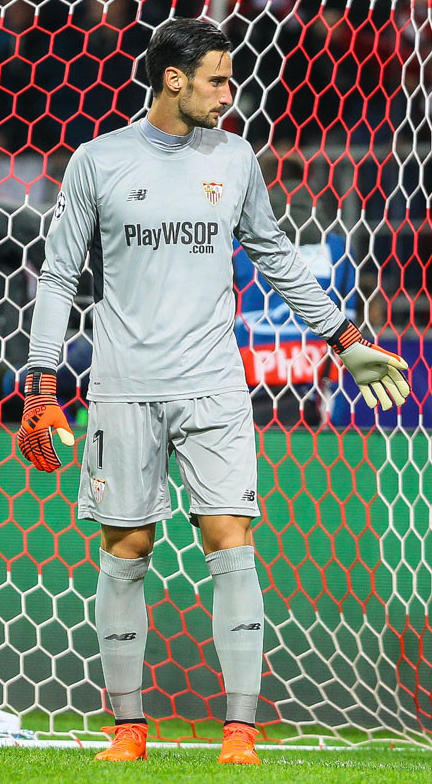
- Rico with Sevilla in 2017

Personal information
- Full name: Sergio Rico González
- Date of birth: 1 September 1993 (age 33)
- Place of birth: Seville, Spain
- Height: 1.95 m (6 ft 5 in)
- Position: Goalkeeper

Youth career
- 2006–2011: Sevilla

Senior career*
Years	Team	Apps	(Gls)
2011–2014	Sevilla B	36	(0)
2014–2020	Sevilla	114	(0)
2018–2019	→ Fulham (loan)	29	(0)
2019–2020	→ Paris Saint-Germain (loan)	2	(0)
2020–2024	Paris Saint-Germain	11	(0)
2022	→ Mallorca (loan)	14	(0)
2024–2026	Al-Gharafa	0	(0)

International career
2016	Spain	1	(0)
- * Club domestic league appearances and goals as of 15:25, 16 May 2022 (UTC)

Sergio Rico González (born 1 September 1993) is a Spanish professional footballer who plays as a goalkeeper.

He began his career at Sevilla, where he twice won the Europa League while appearing in 170 competitive matches. He signed with Paris Saint-Germain in 2019, initially on loan and permanently in 2020.

Rico made his senior international debut for Spain in 2016, and was chosen for that year's European Championship.

== Club career ==
=== Sevilla ===
Rico was born in Seville, Andalusia. He played youth football with Sevilla, spending several of his first seasons as a senior with the reserves, in Segunda División B. On 1 July 2013, he signed a new two-year deal with the club.

On 14 September 2014, profiting from the injuries of both Beto and Mariano Barbosa, Rico made his first-team – and La Liga – debut, starting in a 2–0 home win against Getafe. He first appeared in the UEFA Europa League four days later, playing the full 90 minutes in a home victory over Feyenoord for the same scoreline.

In December 2014, Rico was definitely promoted to the main squad, overtaking Barbosa in the pecking order. He extended his contract with the Rojiblancos on the 16th, signing until 2017 and being awarded a place with the first team. He finished the campaign with 37 appearances in all competitions, including 11 in the Europa League which concluded with a 3–2 defeat of Dnipro in the final.

In 2015–16, Rico played in Sevilla's UEFA Champions League group stage elimination but was replaced by fellow youth graduate David Soria as the team went on to win a third consecutive Europa League title. He was still first choice during 2017–18, but was also involved in altercations with manager Vincenzo Montella and a group of supporters.

On 9 August 2018, Rico was loaned to Fulham for one season. He made his Premier League debut on 27 October, in a 0–3 home loss against Bournemouth. He edged out homegrown player Marcus Bettinelli as the starter for the West London side, who were relegated to the Championship at the end of the campaign.

=== Paris Saint-Germain ===
On 1 September 2019, Rico joined Paris Saint-Germain on a season-long loan deal which included an optional buyout clause. His maiden appearance in Ligue 1 took place two months later in the 2–1 victory at Brest, when Keylor Navas withdrew injured before kick-off.

On 29 June 2020, after the campaign had been halted due to the COVID-19 pandemic, Rico signed a two-month contract extension at the Parc des Princes. On 12 August, he came on as a substitute for the injured Navas late into an eventual 2–1 win over Atalanta in the quarter-finals of the Champions League, and kept his place the next round against RB Leipzig (3–0 victory).

Rico signed a permanent four-year contract on 5 September 2020, the transfer fee being of €6 million. Following the arrival of Gianluigi Donnarumma in July 2021, he was demoted to the role of third-choice.

On 21 January 2022, Rico returned to Spain to join Mallorca on loan until the end of the season. He made his debut on 2 February, in a 1–0 loss at Rayo Vallecano in the quarter-finals of the Copa del Rey. He quickly became the starter, overtaking veteran Manolo Reina; however, after conceding six goals against relegation rivals Granada on 7 May, he returned to the bench.

Rico played no minutes in any competition for PSG in 2022–23 and 2023–24. On 29 June 2024, it was reported that he would be leaving at the end of the month.

=== Al-Gharafa ===
On 29 September 2024, Rico moved to Qatar Stars League club Al-Gharafa. He made his first appearance in 492 days against Al Ain in the league stage of the AFC Champions League Elite, a 4–2 home win.

== International career ==
On 26 May 2015, Rico and Sevilla teammate Aleix Vidal were the two players called up to the Spain national team for the first time, ahead of a friendly with Costa Rica and a UEFA Euro 2016 qualifying match against Belarus, but he did not play in either fixture. He was the third-choice goalkeeper for the final tournament behind Iker Casillas and David de Gea, and made his debut on 1 June, replacing the former for the final 14 minutes of a 6–1 friendly win over South Korea in Salzburg.

== Personal life ==
In December 2016, Rico was given the Sport award at the Young Andalusia Prizes, receiving his honour from regional president Susana Díaz, a fan of city rivals Real Betis.

During a match between PSG and Montpellier on 22 January 2021, Rico's home in Neuilly-sur-Seine was burgled. His father died in March, and his teammate Navas dedicated a penalty save against Barcelona in the Champions League round of 16 to him.

Rico suffered a head injury in a horse-riding accident in the Province of Huelva on 28 May 2023. He was hospitalised at the Hospital Universitario Virgen del Rocío in Seville, with his condition being described as "serious". Due to his injury, he fell into a coma for three weeks, and it was reported that per his medical report he had been "half a centimetre" from death. He received numerous messages of support, notably from Paris Saint-Germain fans, players, directors and his former club Sevilla's players, who wore a shirt in his support prior to the Europa League final. During PSG's final league match of the season on 3 June, fans unveiled a tifo in his honour, while players sported the player's name on the back of their shirts in the first half; at the 16th minute, in reference to Rico's number 16 jersey, he was applauded by the Parc des Princes, and following the match during the celebrations for having won the league title, captain Marquinhos lifted the trophy while sporting his teammate's name on his chest.

On 18 August 2023, Rico was discharged from the hospital.

== Career statistics ==
=== Club ===
As of match played 17 February 2025

Appearances and goals by club, season and competition
Club	Season	League			National cup (Note: Includes Copa del Rey, Coupe de France)		League cup (Note: Includes FA Cup, Coupe de la Ligue)		Continental		Other		Total	
Club	Season	Division	Apps	Goals	Apps	Goals	Apps	Goals	Apps	Goals	Apps	Goals	Apps	Goals
Sevilla B	2010–11	Segunda División B	1	0	—		—		—		—		1	0
Sevilla B	2011–12	Segunda División B	2	0	—		—		—		—		2	0
Sevilla B	2012–13	Segunda División B	10	0	—		—		—		—		10	0
Sevilla B	2013–14	Segunda División B	22	0	—		—		—		—		22	0
Sevilla B	2014–15	Segunda División B	1	0	—		—		—		—		1	0
Sevilla B	Total		36	0	—		—		—		—		36	0
Sevilla	2011–12	La Liga	0	0	0	0	—		—		—		0	0
Sevilla	2012–13	La Liga	0	0	0	0	—		—		—		0	0
Sevilla	2013–14	La Liga	0	0	—		—		—		—		0	0
Sevilla	2014–15	La Liga	21	0	5	0	—		11 (Note: Appearances in UEFA Europa League)	0	0	0	37	0
Sevilla	2015–16	La Liga	34	0	5	0	—		6 (Note: Appearances in UEFA Champions League)	0	0	0	45	0
Sevilla	2016–17	La Liga	35	0	1	0	—		8	0	3 (Note: One appearance in UEFA Super Cup, two appearances in Supercopa de España)	0	47	0
Sevilla	2017–18	La Liga	24	0	6	0	—		10	0	—		40	0
Sevilla	2018–19	La Liga	—		—		—		1	0	—		1	0
Sevilla	Total		114	0	17	0	—		36	0	3	0	170	0
Fulham (loan)	2018–19	Premier League	29	0	0	0	3	0	—		—		32	0
Paris Saint-Germain (loan)	2019–20	Ligue 1	2	0	3	0	2	0	3	0	0	0	10	0
Paris Saint-Germain	2020–21	Ligue 1	10	0	3	0	—		0	0	0	0	13	0
Paris Saint-Germain	2021–22	Ligue 1	1	0	0	0	—		0	0	0	0	1	0
Paris Saint-Germain	2022–23	Ligue 1	0	0	0	0	—		0	0	0	0	0	0
Paris Saint-Germain	2023–24	Ligue 1	0	0	0	0	—		0	0	0	0	0	0
Paris Saint-Germain	Paris total		13	0	6	0	—		3	0	2	0	24	0
Mallorca (loan)	2021–22	La Liga	14	0	1	0	—		—		—		15	0
Al-Gharafa	2024–25	Qatar Stars League	—		—		—		7 (Note: Appearances in AFC Champions League Elite)	0	—		7	0
Career total			206	0	24	0	5	0	46	0	3	0	284	0

== Honours ==
Sevilla

- UEFA Europa League: 2014–15, 2015–16

Paris Saint-Germain

- Ligue 1: 2019–20, 2021–22
- Coupe de France: 2019–20, 2020–21
- Coupe de la Ligue: 2019–20
- Trophée des Champions: 2020
- UEFA Champions League runner-up: 2019–20
