= UE San Juan Atlético de Montcada =

Association football club in Spain

San Juan At. Montcada
- Full name: Unió Esportiva San Juan Atlético de Montcada
- Founded: 1942; 1988 (merger)
- Ground: Can Sant Joan, Montcada i Reixac, Catalonia, Spain
- Capacity: 1,000
- President: Óscar Pérez
- Manager: Daniel Sánchez
- League: Tercera Federación – Group 5
- 2025–26: Lliga Elit, 1st of 16 (champions)
| Home colours | Away colours |

Unió Esportiva San Juan Atlético de Montcada (sometimes referred as Sant Joan Atlètic) is a Spanish football team based in Montcada i Reixac, Barcelona, Catalonia. Founded in 1942, they play in the Tercera Federación – Group 5, holding home matches at the Camp de Futbol Municipal Can Sant Joan.

== History ==
Founded in 1942 as Club Deportivo San Juan Montcada, the club merged with Atlètic de Sant Joan (Atlético de San Juan) to form Unió Esportiva San Juan Atlético de Montcada in 1988. In 2015, the club achieved a first-ever promotion to the Primera Catalana, and managed to stay three seasons in the category before suffering relegation.

In May 2025, San Juan Atlético achieved promotion to the highest level of regional football again, now called Lliga Elit. On 16 May of the following year, the club achieved a first-ever promotion to Tercera Federación, also winning the league.

== Season to season ==
| Season | Tier | Division | Place | Copa del Rey |
|---|---|---|---|---|
| 1988–89 | 7 | 2ª Reg. | 14th | |
| 1989–90 | 7 | 2ª Reg. | 17th | |
| 1990–1994 | DNP | | | |
| 1994–95 | 9 | 3ª Terr. | 7th | |
| 1995–96 | 9 | 3ª Terr. | 1st | |
| 1996–97 | 8 | 2ª Terr. | 11th | |
| 1997–98 | 8 | 2ª Terr. | 14th | |
| 1998–99 | 8 | 2ª Terr. | 13th | |
| 1999–2000 | 8 | 2ª Terr. | 9th | |
| 2000–01 | 8 | 2ª Terr. | 5th | |
| 2001–02 | 8 | 2ª Terr. | 10th | |
| 2002–03 | 8 | 2ª Terr. | 11th | |
| 2003–04 | 8 | 2ª Terr. | 13th | |
| 2004–05 | 8 | 2ª Terr. | 5th | |
| 2005–06 | 8 | 2ª Terr. | 5th | |
| 2006–07 | 8 | 2ª Terr. | 7th | |
| 2007–08 | 8 | 2ª Terr. | 2nd | |
| 2008–09 | 7 | 1ª Terr. | 10th | |
| 2009–10 | 7 | 1ª Terr. | 16th | |
| 2010–11 | 8 | 2ª Terr. | 8th | |

| Season | Tier | Division | Place | Copa del Rey |
|---|---|---|---|---|
| 2011–12 | 7 | 3ª Cat. | 1st | |
| 2012–13 | 6 | 2ª Cat. | 11th | |
| 2013–14 | 6 | 2ª Cat. | 9th | |
| 2014–15 | 6 | 2ª Cat. | 5th | |
| 2015–16 | 6 | 2ª Cat. | 1st | |
| 2016–17 | 5 | 1ª Cat. | 11th | |
| 2017–18 | 5 | 1ª Cat. | 9th | |
| 2018–19 | 5 | 1ª Cat. | 16th | |
| 2019–20 | 6 | 2ª Cat. | 3rd | |
| 2020–21 | 6 | 2ª Cat. | 6th | |
| 2021–22 | 7 | 2ª Cat. | 7th | |
| 2022–23 | 7 | 2ª Cat. | 1st | |
| 2023–24 | 7 | 1ª Cat. | 3rd | |
| 2024–25 | 7 | 1ª Cat. | 3rd | |
| 2025–26 | 6 | Lliga Elit | 1st | |
| 2026–27 | 5 | 3ª Fed. | | |

- 1 season in Tercera Federación
