= Miguel Álvarez (football manager, born 1958) =

Spanish football manager (born 1958)

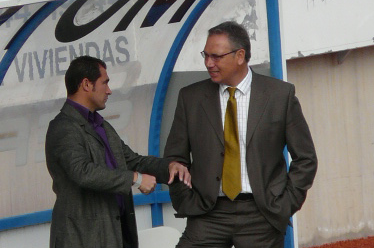
- Álvarez (right) with Lorca in 2008.

Personal information
- Full name: Miguel Álvarez Jurado
- Date of birth: 22 March 1958 (age 68)
- Place of birth: Guarromán, Spain

Managerial career
- Years: Team
- 1988–1990: Gramenet (youth)
- 1990–1991: Premià (youth)
- 1991–1992: Cerdanyola Mataró
- 1992–1993: Guíxols
- 1993–1994: Horta
- 1994–1997: Vilassar Mar
- 1997–2000: Mataró
- 2000–2003: Terrassa
- 2004: Ciudad Murcia
- 2005: Ciudad Murcia
- 2006–2007: Terrassa
- 2007–2008: Lorca
- 2008–2009: Badalona
- 2010–2011: Hospitalet
- 2011: Leganés
- 2012–2013: Hospitalet
- 2013–2014: Alcorcón
- 2015: Sant Andreu
- 2015–2016: Sabadell
- 2017: Marbella
- 2017–2025: Villarreal B
- 2025–2026: Ibiza

Miguel Álvarez Jurado (born 22 March 1958) is a Spanish football manager.

== Managerial career ==
Born in Guarromán, Jaén, Andalusia, Álvarez made his managerial debuts with UDA Gramenet's youth setup in 1988. In 1991, he managed his first senior team, UE Cerdanyola de Mataró in the regional leagues.

In the 2000 summer Álvarez was appointed Terrassa FC manager, achieving a promotion to Segunda División in 2002. After avoiding relegation in the following year, he was sacked in September 2003.

In 2004 Álvarez was named Ciudad de Murcia manager. He was relieved from his duties on 20 December 2004 but returned to the club on 3 May of the following year, and narrowly avoided the drop.

In March 2006 Álvarez returned to Terrassa, now in Segunda División B, and subsequently stayed in the category, managing Lorca Deportiva CF, CF Badalona, CE L'Hospitalet (two stints) and CD Leganés. After missing out promotion in the play-offs with Hospi, he was appointed at the helm of second level's AD Alcorcón on 3 July 2013.

On 4 February 2014 Álvarez was sacked, mainly due to the club's poor home records in the campaign. On 18 February 2015, after one year without any club, he was named UE Sant Andreu manager.

On 12 June 2015 Álvarez was appointed CE Sabadell FC manager, signing a two-year deal. He signed for Marbella FC on 6 March 2017, replacing Mehdi Nafti, but was fired on 25 April. On 4 October 2017, he was appointed Villarreal CF B head coach.

Álvarez led the Mini Submarine to a promotion to the second division in 2022, and renewed his contract for a further year on 1 June 2023. The following 30 May, despite the club's relegation to Primera Federación, he further extended his link until 2026.

On 29 May 2025, Álvarez ended his eight-year spell at Villarreal B, after managing the side on nearly 300 matches. On 22 October, he replaced Paco Jémez at the helm of UD Ibiza also in division three, but left the following 25 May as his contract was due to expire.

== Managerial statistics ==
As of match played 1 June 2026

Managerial record by team and tenure
Team	Nat	From	To	Record								Ref
Team	Nat	From	To	G	W	D	L	GF	GA	GD	Win %	Ref
Cerdanyola Mataró	(Spain)	20 June 1991	30 June 1992	34	21	8	5	61	32	+29	61.76	
Guíxols	(Spain)	1 July 1992	30 June 1993	38	11	11	16	50	53	−3	28.95	
Horta	(Spain)	1 July 1993	30 June 1994	38	19	12	7	54	35	+19	50.00	
Vilassar Mar	(Spain)	30 June 1994	1 July 1997	116	54	24	38	185	142	+43	46.55	
Mataró	(Spain)	1 July 1997	29 June 2000	132	72	31	29	270	140	+130	54.55	
Terrassa	(Spain)	29 June 2000	18 September 2003	137	50	46	41	171	145	+26	36.50	
Ciudad Murcia	(Spain)	1 July 2004	20 December 2004	19	3	8	8	22	32	−10	15.79	
Ciudad Murcia	(Spain)	3 May 2005	30 June 2005	7	3	2	2	8	6	+2	42.86	
Terrassa	(Spain)	1 March 2006	30 June 2007	56	22	16	18	70	62	+8	39.29	
Lorca Deportiva	(Spain)	1 July 2007	30 June 2008	41	13	12	16	44	47	−3	31.71	
Badalona	(Spain)	30 June 2008	1 July 2009	38	14	11	13	46	43	+3	36.84	
Hospitalet	(Spain)	26 October 2010	20 June 2011	28	15	7	6	52	25	+27	53.57	
Leganés	(Spain)	20 June 2011	15 November 2011	15	2	8	5	18	22	−4	13.33	
Hospitalet	(Spain)	9 June 2012	3 July 2013	48	26	12	10	72	37	+35	54.17	
Alcorcón	(Spain)	3 July 2013	4 February 2014	30	11	7	12	34	31	+3	36.67	
Sant Andreu	(Spain)	18 February 2015	12 June 2015	13	3	3	7	20	25	−5	23.08	
Sabadell	(Spain)	12 June 2015	1 July 2016	44	17	14	13	57	45	+12	38.64	
Marbella	(Spain)	7 March 2017	25 April 2017	7	1	2	4	5	10	−5	14.29	
Villarreal B	(Spain)	4 October 2017	29 May 2025	291	109	85	97	377	333	+44	37.46	
Ibiza	(Spain)	22 October 2025	25 May 2026	31	10	10	11	37	27	+10	32.26	
Career total				1,163	476	329	358	1,653	1,292	+361	40.93	—

== Honours ==
Terrassa FC

- Copa Catalunya: 2001–02, 2002–03

CE Sabadell

- Copa Catalunya: 2015–16

== See also ==
- List of football managers with the most matches
