= Mariano Barbosa =

Argentine footballer

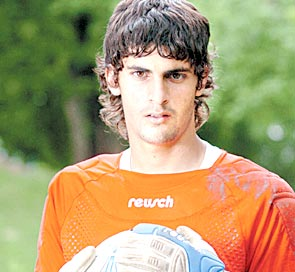
- Barbosa in 2012

Personal information
- Full name: Mariano Damián Barbosa
- Date of birth: 27 July 1984 (age 42)
- Place of birth: Lanús, Argentina
- Height: 1.88 m (6 ft 2 in)
- Position: Goalkeeper

Senior career*
Years	Team	Apps	(Gls)
2002–2005	Banfield	38	(0)
2005–2007	Villarreal	21	(0)
2007–2008	Recreativo	0	(0)
2008–2009	Estudiantes	1	(0)
2009	→ River Plate (loan)	4	(0)
2009–2010	Atlas	28	(0)
2010–2014	Las Palmas	156	(0)
2014–2015	Sevilla	2	(0)
2015–2020	Villarreal	15	(0)
Total		265	(0)

International career
2003	Argentina U20	2	(0)
- * Club domestic league appearances and goals

Mariano Damián Barbosa (born 27 July 1984) is an Argentine former professional footballer who played as a goalkeeper.

== Club career ==
Born in Lanús, Buenos Aires, Barbosa started his career with Club Atlético Banfield in 2002. In June 2005, he was signed by Spanish club Villarreal CF for a fee of €2 million alongside another player in his position, Sebastián Viera.

Barbosa served mainly as reserve at Villarreal, but filled in for Viera in several games, most notably in the semi-finals of the 2005–06 UEFA Champions League against Arsenal. Even though he did not let in any goals in the second leg, the English had won 1–0 in the first for an eventual qualification.

In the summer of 2007, after the signing of Diego López, Barbosa was allowed to join fellow La Liga side Recreativo de Huelva. Barred by Italian Stefano Sorrentino, he made no appearances in his sole season.

In 2008, Barbosa returned to his country and joined Estudiantes de La Plata, being loaned to fellow Argentine Primera División team Club Atlético River Plate the following year. Following an unsuccessful spell, he was sold to Atlas F.C. of Mexico on 7 July 2009.

After one year with Atlas, Barbosa returned to Spain and signed for Segunda División's UD Las Palmas. He was an undisputed started during his spell in the Canary Islands, never playing less than 37 league matches.

Barbosa moved to Sevilla FC on 16 July 2014 on a free transfer, penning a two-year deal. In June 2015, having been demoted to third choice due to the emergence of Sergio Rico, he terminated his contract.

On 9 July 2015, Barbosa returned to Villarreal after agreeing to a two-year deal. He acted as starter during the first part of the 2017–18 campaign, due to the serious knee injuries of Sergio Asenjo and Andrés Fernández.

After retiring at the age of 36, Barbosa remained at his last club as goalkeeper coach of the reserves.

== International career ==
Barbosa was second-choice for the Argentina under-20 team that reached the semi-finals of the FIFA World Cup in 2003, eventually finishing in fourth place. He replaced suspended Gustavo Eberto in the round-of-16 game against Egypt, a 2–1 win.

== Career statistics ==
Appearances and goals by club, season and competition
Club	Season	League			Cup		Continental		Other		Total	
Club	Season	Division	Apps	Goals	Apps	Goals	Apps	Goals	Apps	Goals	Apps	Goals
Banfield	2002–03	Argentine Primera División	7	0	—		—		—		7	0
Banfield	2003–04	Argentine Primera División	9	0	—		2	0	—		11	0
Banfield	2004–05	Argentine Primera División	22	0	—		10	0	—		32	0
Banfield	Total		38	0	—		12	0	—		50	0
Villarreal	2005–06	La Liga	10	0	1	0	6	0	—		17	0
Villarreal	2006–07	La Liga	11	0	2	0	1	0	—		14	0
Villarreal	Total		21	0	3	0	7	0	—		31	0
Recreativo de Huelva	2007–08	La Liga	0	0	4	0	—		—		4	0
Estudiantes	2008–09	Argentine Primera División	1	0	—		0	0	—		1	0
River Plate (loan)	2008–09	Argentine Primera División	4	0	—		3	0	—		7	0
Atlas	2009–10	Liga MX	28	0	—		—		—		28	0
Las Palmas	2010–11	Segunda División	39	0	0	0	—		—		47	0
Las Palmas	2011–12	Segunda División	37	0	1	0	—		—		38	0
Las Palmas	2012–13	Segunda División	39	0	6	0	—		2	0	47	0
Las Palmas	2013–14	Segunda División	41	0	1	0	—		4	0	46	0
Las Palmas	Total		156	0	8	0	—		6	0	170	0
Sevilla	2014–15	La Liga	2	0	0	0	0	0	0	0	2	0
Villarreal	2015–16	La Liga	2	0	4	0	6	0	—		12	0
Villarreal	2016–17	La Liga	0	0	2	0	0	0	—		2	0
Villarreal	2017–18	La Liga	13	0	2	0	6	0	—		21	0
Villarreal	2018–19	La Liga	0	0	0	0	0	0	—		0	0
Villarreal	2019–20	La Liga	0	0	0	0	—		—		0	0
Villarreal	Total		15	0	8	0	12	0	—		35	0
Career total			265	0	23	0	34	0	6	0	328	0
