= Lliga Elit =

- Founded: 2022
- First season: 2023–24
- Country: Spain
- Confederation: FCF
- Number of clubs: 16
- Level on pyramid: 6
- Promotion to: Tercera Federación (Group 5)
- Relegation to: Primera Catalana
- Domestic cup: Copa Catalunya
- Current champions: San Juan Atlético Montcada (2025–26)
- Most championships: Europa B San Juan Atlético Montcada; Vic (1 title)
- Website: Official website
- Current: 2026–27 Lliga Elit

The Lliga Elit, originally named Superlliga Catalana, is the 6th tier of the Spanish football league system and the highest league in the autonomous community of Catalonia. The league was formed in 2022 to replace Primera Catalana as the first level of Catalonia, starting from the 2023–24 season.

The Lliga Elit arose because the FCF considered it necessary to create a transition league between the regional and national divisions of Spanish football with the aim of helping Catalan teams to establish themselves in professional football.

== Structure ==
The league comprises 16 teams. Over the course of a season, which runs annually from September to the following May, each team plays twice against the others in the league, once at 'home' and once 'away', resulting in each team competing in 30 games in total. Three points are awarded for a win, one for a draw and zero for a loss. The teams are ranked in the league table by points gained. In the event that two or more teams finish the season equal in all these respects, teams are separated by head-to-head points, then head-to-head goal difference, then head-to-head goals scored, then goal difference and then goals scored. The top two teams of the season will be promoted to Tercera Federación, while a third team will be promoted after winning a play-off between the clubs placed between third and sixth place of the season. The four worst teams of the season will be relegated to Primera Catalana, the new seventh level of competition.

== Teams ==
Location of teams of the 2025–26 Lliga Elit
Location of teams of the 2025–26 Lliga Elit (Province of Barcelona)

The league has 16 teams, nine remained from the Lliga Elit previous season, four were promoted from Primera Catalana, two were relegated from Tercera Federación and one was relegated from Segunda Federación due to a sanction from the Royal Spanish Football Federation.

Team	City	Home ground	Position (2024–25)
Atlétic San Just	Sant Just Desvern	Municipal de Sant Just	3rd
Castelldefels	Castelldefels	Els Canyars	7th
Ciudad Cooperativa	Sant Boi de Llobregat	Dani Jarque–Ciutat Cooperativa	1st (1ªCat – Group 3)
Horta	Barcelona	Feliu i Codina	5th
Júpiter	Barcelona	La Verneda	2nd (1ªCat – Group 2)
Manlleu	Manlleu	Municipal de Manlleu	9th
Martinenc	Barcelona	Municipal del Guinardó	1st (1ªCat – Group 2)
Pobla de Mafumet	La Pobla de Mafumet	Municipal de La Pobla de Mafumet	12th
Prat	El Prat de Llobregat	Poliesportiu Sagnier	18th (3ªRFEF – Group 5)
Rubí	Rubí	Can Rosés	8th
Sabadell B	Sabadell	Ciutat Esportiva Sabadell-Olímpia	17th (3ªRFEF – Group 5)
San Juan Atlético Montcada	Montcada i Reixac	Can Sant Joan	1st (1ªCat – Group 1)
San Mauro	Santa Margarida de Montbui	Municipal de Santa Margarida	11th
Santfeliuenc	Sant Feliu de Llobregat	Nou Municipal de Les Grases	2nd (1ªCat – Group 3)
Valls	Valls	Camp del Vilar	10th
Vilafranca	Vilafranca del Penedès	Municipal de Vilafranca	6th

== Champions ==
Season	Team
2023–24	Europa B
2024–25	Vic
2025–26	San Juan Atlético Montcada
