= Yeray Luxem =

Belgian triathlete

Yeray Luxem (born 1986 in Belgium) is an athlete from Belgium, who has been competing in triathlon since 2004.

== Notable achievements ==
5th Overall place Xterra Europe 2014 (http://www.xterraeurope.com/ranking14/)

2nd Overall place Xterra Europe 2013 (http://www.xterraeurope.com/uploadedfiles/2013EuropeanPoints.pdf)
