= Yeray Sabariego =

Spanish footballer

Yeray
Personal information
- Full name: Yeray Sabariego Raja
- Date of birth: 4 June 1993 (age 33)
- Place of birth: Badia del Vallès, Spain
- Height: 1.83 m (6 ft 0 in)
- Position: Midfielder

Team information
- Current team: San Cristóbal

Youth career
- 1999–2003: Badia
- 2003–2007: Espanyol
- 2007–2012: Jàbac Terrassa

Senior career*
Years	Team	Apps	(Gls)
2012–2015	Sabadell B	48	(2)
2013–2017	Sabadell	55	(0)
2017	Granada B	7	(0)
2017–2018	Olot	1	(0)
2018–2020	Llagostera	33	(0)
2020–2021	Grama	24	(0)
2021–2022	Prat	23	(0)
2022–2025	San Cristóbal	63	(5)
- * Club domestic league appearances and goals as of 4 May 2026

Yeray Sabariego Raja (born 4 June 1993), simply known as Yeray, is a Spanish former footballer. He played as a central midfielder.

== Club career ==
Born in Badia del Vallès, Barcelona, Catalonia, Yeray finished his formation with CE Sabadell FC's youth setup, after short stints with neighbours CD Badia del Vallès, RCD Espanyol and UFB Jàbac Terrassa. He was promoted to the reserves in the regional leagues in the 2012 summer.

On 7 September 2013, Yeray played his first match as a professional, starting in a 1–1 away draw against Deportivo Alavés in the Segunda División. On 18 May 2015, he renewed his contract for two more years, after appearing more regularly during the campaign.

On 27 January 2017 Yeray left the Arquelinats by mutual agreement, and joined Granada CF B just hours later.
