= CE Sabadell FC B =

Spanish football club

Sabadell B
- Full name: Centre d'Esports; Sabadell Futbol Club "B", S.A.D.
- Nicknames: Arlequinats, Saballuts, Laneros
- Founded: 1968; 2006 (refounded)
- Ground: Ciutat Esportiva Olímpia, Sabadell, Catalonia, Spain
- Capacity: 1,000
- President: Pau Morilla-Giner
- Head coach: Kiku Parcerisas
- League: Lliga Elit
- 2025–26: Lliga Elit, 9th of 16
- Website: http://www.cesabadell.cat/
Home colours	Away colours	Third colours

Centre d'Esports Sabadell Futbol Club "B", S.A.D. (Catalan pronunciation: [ˈsentɾə ðəsˈpɔɾ(ts) səβəˈðeʎ fubˈbɔl ˈklup]) is a Spanish football team based in Sabadell, a city in the Province of Barcelona in the autonomous community of Catalonia. Founded in 1969, it plays in Lliga Elit and is the reserve team of CE Sabadell FC, holding home games at Ciutat Esportiva Olímpia, only 100 meters away from Nova Creu Alta.

== History ==
Founded in 1968, Sabadell B moved down to the last category in 1980. Nine years later, it returned to Primera Regional, only lasting nine seasons in the category. It eventually folded in 2003, and the first team subsequently established an agreement with CF Can Llong. In 2006, Can Llong merged into Sabadell's structure, and the B-team was refounded under the name of Centre d'Esports Sabadell Amateur-Can Llong.

The club switched back to the name of Sabadell B in 2007, and after achieving promotion to Segunda Catalana in 2010–11, the club promoted to Primera Catalana at the end of the 2012–13 campaign.

On 14 June 2014, Sabadell B was promoted to Tercera División for the first time, after a 1–0 win against CF Sales Viladecans.

=== Club background ===
- Centro de Deportes Sabadell Amateur (1967–1984)
- Centre d'Esports Sabadell Futbol Club B (1984–2002)

- Club de Fútbol Can Llong (2002–2006)
- Centre d'Esports Sabadell Amateur-Can Llong (2006–2007)
- Centre d'Esports Sabadell Futbol Club B (2007–)

== Season to season ==
Season	Tier	Division	Place	Copa del Rey
1967–68	5	2ª Reg.	9th	
1968–69	6	2ª Reg.	1st	
1969–70	5	1ª Reg.	1st	
1970–71	4	Reg. Pref.	5th	
1971–72	4	Reg. Pref.	17th	
1972–73	4	Reg. Pref.	19th	
1973–74	5	1ª Reg.	7th	
1974–75	5	1ª Reg.	12th	
1975–76	5	1ª Reg.	18th	
1976–77	6	2ª Reg.	3rd	
1977–78	6	1ª Reg.	11th	
1978–79	6	1ª Reg.	11th	
1979–80	6	1ª Reg.	20th	
1980–81	7	2ª Reg.	8th	
1981–82	7	2ª Reg.	5th	
1982–83	7	2ª Reg.	11th	
1983–84	7	2ª Reg.	5th	
1984–85	7	2ª Reg.	4th	

Season	Tier	Division	Place	Copa del Rey
1985–86	7	2ª Reg.	8th	
1986–87	7	2ª Reg.	4th	
1987–88	7	2ª Reg.	2nd	
1988–89	7	2ª Reg.	1st	
1989–90	6	1ª Reg.	1st	
1990–91	5	Reg. Pref.	7th	DNP
1991–92	5	1ª Cat.	6th	DNP
1992–93	5	1ª Cat.	3rd	DNP
1993–94	5	1ª Cat.	19th	DNP
1994–95	6	Pref. Terr.	16th	DNP
1995–96	7	1ª Terr.	11th	DNP
1996–97	7	1ª Terr.	6th	DNP
1997–98	7	1ª Terr.	15th	DNP
1998–99	8	2ª Terr.	2nd	DNP
1999–2000	8	2ª Terr.	12th	DNP
2000–01	8	2ª Terr.	6th	DNP
2001–02	8	2ª Terr.	10th	DNP
2002–03	8	2ª Terr.	10th	DNP

- Refounded

Season	Tier	Division	Place
2006–07	8	2ª Terr.	3rd
2007–08	8	2ª Terr.	7th
2008–09	8	2ª Terr.	3rd
2009–10	8	2ª Terr.	1st
2010–11	7	1ª Terr.	4th
2011–12	6	2ª Cat.	11th
2012–13	6	2ª Cat.	1st
2013–14	5	1ª Cat.	2nd
2014–15	4	3ª	15th
2015–16	4	3ª	6th
2016–17	4	3ª	20th
2017–18	5	1ª Cat.	16th
2018–19	6	2ª Cat.	11th
2019–20	6	2ª Cat.	15th
2020–21	6	2ª Cat.	4th
2021–22	7	2ª Cat.	1st
2022–23	6	1ª Cat.	4th
2023–24	6	Lliga Elit	2nd
2024–25	5	3ª Fed.	17th
2025–26	6	Lliga Elit	9th
2026-27	6	Lliga Elit	

- 3 seasons in Tercera División
- 1 season in Tercera Federación

== Current squad ==
As of 4 October 2026

Note: Flags indicate national team as defined under FIFA eligibility rules; some limited exceptions apply. Players may hold more than one non-FIFA nationality.

No.	Pos.	Nation	Player
1	GK	ESP	Jota Domínguez
2	DF	ESP	Pau Guillén
3	DF	ESP	Roger Farrerons
5	DF	ESP	Mario Torres (captain)
6	MF	ESP	Nil Arumí
7	FW	ESP	Fran Rivera
8	MF	ESP	Samu Bauló
9	FW	ESP	Adri González
10	FW	ESP	Erick Salguero
11	FW	ESP	Sergio Sandoval
12	DF	ESP	Alonso Zamora
13	GK	ESP	Manel Estévez
14	MF	ESP	César Guzmán
15	DF	ESP	Félix Giménez

No.	Pos.	Nation	Player
16	MF	ECU	Adrián Cuadrado
17	FW	ESP	Unai Gallego
18	MF	ESP	Yann Maldonado
19	FW	ESP	Quim Utgés
20	FW	ESP	Joel Montero
21	MF	ESP	Nil Ribas
22	DF	ESP	Enric Sáez
23	DF	ESP	Joel Alsina
24	DF	ESP	Mamadou Bouhary
—	GK	ESP	Victor Puig
—	DF	ESP	Alejandro Carvajal
—	DF	USA	Hudson Davis
—	DF	ESP	Vincent Pemberton

=== Youth team ===
Note: Flags indicate national team as defined under FIFA eligibility rules; some limited exceptions apply. Players may hold more than one non-FIFA nationality.

No.	Pos.	Nation	Player
—	DF	ESP	Marc Méndez
