= Santa Margarida de Montbui =

- Municipality
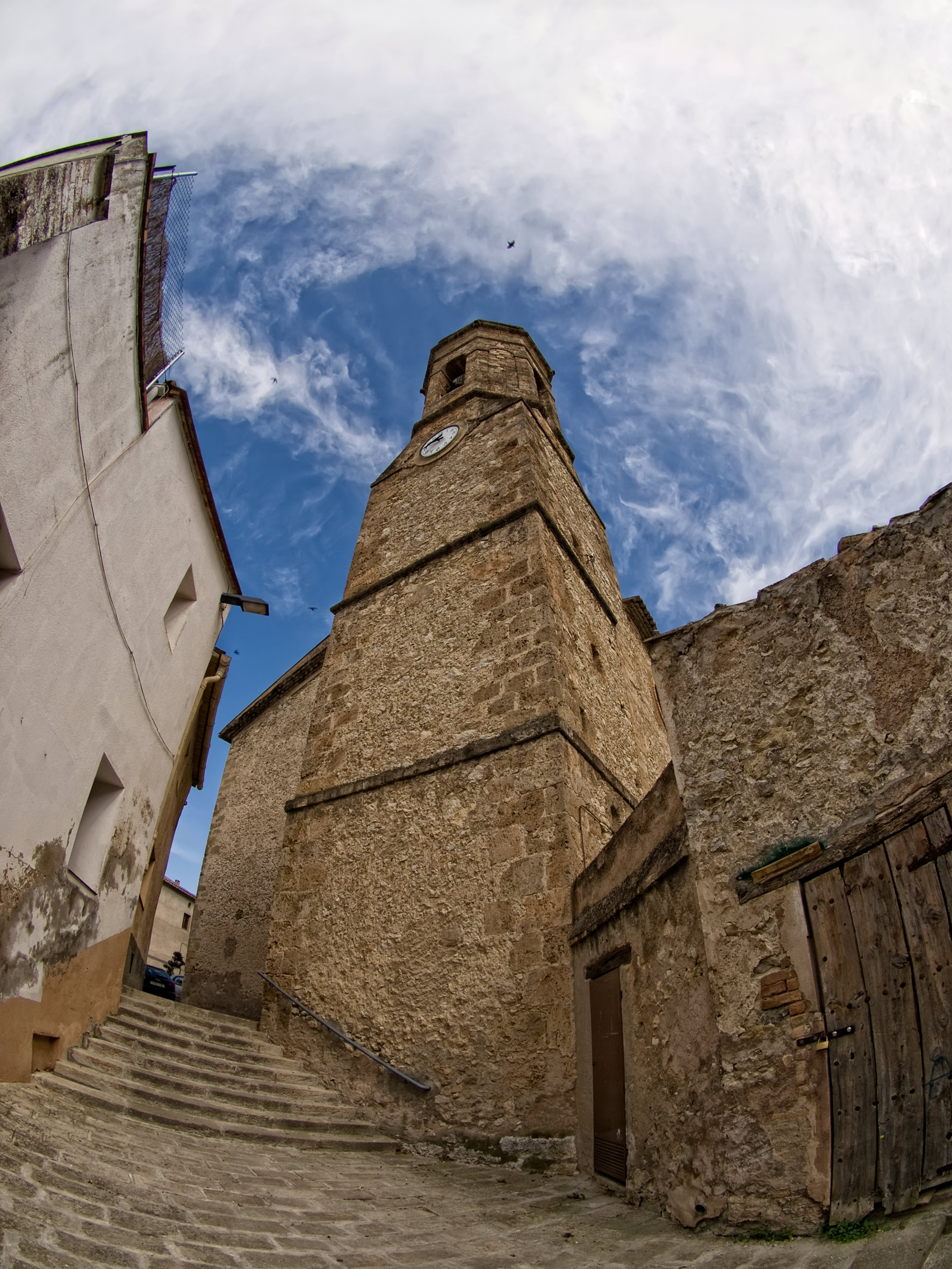
- Parish church

- Flag Coat of arms

- Location in Catalonia Santa Margarida de Montbui (Spain)
- Coordinates: 41°34′32″N 1°36′33″E
- Country: Spain
- Community: Catalonia
- Province: Barcelona
- Comarca: Anoia

Government
  - Mayor: Jesús Miguel "Schummi" Juárez Tamayo

Area
  - Total: 27.6 km^{2} (10.7 sq mi)
- Elevation: 316 m (1,037 ft)

Population (2025-01-01)
  - Total: 10,631
  - Density: 385/km^{2} (998/sq mi)
- Demonym(s): Montbuienc, montbuienca
- Website: www.montbui.cat

Santa Maragarida de Montbui (Catalan pronunciation: [ˈsantə məɾɣəˈɾiðə ðə mumˈbuj]) is a municipality in the comarca of the Anoia in Catalonia, Spain. It is situated in the Òdena Basin, immediately to the west of Igualada of which it effectively forms a suburb. The ajuntament (town hall) is in Sant Maure. Other neighbourhoods in Montbui are the Old Town, el Saió-Coll del Guix and La Mallola.

== Demography ==
Montbui has received a huge immigration in the late fifties.

1900	1930	1950	1970	1986	2007
531	961	790	5229	9088	9825

== Geography ==
The most famous mountain in Santa Margarida de Montbui is called La Tossa. It has an altitude of 650 m. La Tossa mountain belongs to the serra de Miralles-Queralt range. In this mountain there is a Romanesque chapel devoted to Virgin Mary and dating back to the 11th century.

The Anoia river borders Santa Margarida de Montbui to the South and separates this municipality from Igualada.

== Education and culture ==
In Montbui there are three primary education schools (Montbou, García Lorca and Antoni Gaudí) and a secondary school (Institut Montbui)

Some of the cultural centres in Montbui are La Vinícola (Sant Maure) and the Ateneu Cultural i Recreatiu (Old town).
