= List of Spanish football transfers summer 2017 =

This is a list of Spanish football transfers for the summer sale in the 2017–18 season of La Liga and Segunda División. Only moves from La Liga and Segunda División are listed.

The summer transfer window began on 1 July 2017, although a few transfers took place prior to that date. The window closed at midnight on 1 September 2017. Players without a club can join one at any time, either during or in between transfer windows. Clubs below La Liga level can also sign players on loan at any time. If needed, clubs can sign a goalkeeper on an emergency loan, if all others are unavailable. Unless noted, all of the clubs without a flag are from Spain.

== La Liga ==
=== Alavés ===
Manager: Luis Zubeldía (1st season)

==== In ====
Date	Player	From	Type	Fee	Ref
29 May 2017	Rubén Duarte	Espanyol	Transfer	€400K	
29 May 2017	Ermedin Demirović	RB Leipzig	Transfer	Free	
12 June 2017	Héctor Hernández	Real Sociedad	Loan	Free	
29 June 2017	Enzo Fernández	Real Madrid	Transfer	Free	
1 July 2017	Sergio Llamas	Alavés B	Promoted		
5 July 2017	Alfonso Pedraza	Villarreal	Loan	Free	
6 July 2017	Rubén Sobrino	Manchester City	Transfer	€2M	
7 July 2017	Juanan Entrena	Granada	Transfer	Free	
8 July 2017	Guillermo Maripán	Universidad Católica	Transfer	Undisclosed	
11 July 2017	Burgui	Real Madrid	Transfer	€3M	
14 July 2017	Antonio Cristian	Espanyol B	Transfer	Free	
17 July 2017	Mubarak Wakaso	Panathinaikos	Transfer	Free	
19 July 2017	Antonio Sivera	Valencia Mestalla	Transfer	€2M	
21 July 2017	Rodrigo Ely	Milan	Transfer	€3M	
29 July 2017	Arturo Segado	Malaga B	Transfer	Free	
7 August 2017	Tomás Pina	Club Brugge	Loan	Free	
26 August 2017	Nando	Valencia	Transfer	Free	
31 August 2017	Bojan Krkić	Stoke City	Loan	Free	
1 September 2017	Álvaro Medrán	Valencia	Loan	Free	
1 September 2017	Munir El Haddadi	Barcelona	Loan	Free	

==== Out ====
Date	Player	To	Type	Fee	Ref
5 June 2017	Raúl García	Leganés	Transfer	Free	
30 June 2017	Víctor Camarasa	Levante	Loan return	Free	
30 June 2017	Rodrigo Ely	Milan	Loan return	Free	
30 June 2017	Marcos Llorente	Real Madrid	Loan return	Free	
30 June 2017	Adrián Ortolá	Barcelona B	Loan return	Free	
30 June 2017	Deyverson	Levante	Loan return	Free	
30 June 2017	Théo Hernandez	Atlético Madrid	Loan return	Free	
30 June 2017	Rubén Sobrino	Manchester City	Loan return	Free	
1 July 2017	Kiko Femenía	Watford	Transfer	Free	
3 July 2017	Édgar Méndez	Cruz Azul	Transfer	€5M	
7 July 2017	Juanan Entrena	Rudeš	Loan	Free	
19 July 2017	Antonio Cristian	Rudeš	Loan	Free	
24 July 2017	Zouhair Feddal	Betis	Transfer	€2.5M	
29 July 2017	Arturo Segado	Rudeš	Loan	Free	
4 August 2017	Gaizka Toquero	Zaragoza	Transfer	Free	
15 August 2017	Sergio Llamas	Real Unión	Loan	Free	
23 August 2017	Nenad Krstičić	Red Star Belgrade	Transfer	Free	
28 August 2017	Nando	Lorca	Loan	Free	

=== Athletic Bilbao ===
Manager: José Ángel Ziganda (1st season)

==== In ====
Date	Player	From	Type	Fee	Ref
30 June 2017	Iago Herrerín	Leganés	Loan return	Free	
30 June 2017	Markel Etxeberria	Valladolid	Loan return	Free	
30 June 2017	Óscar Gil	Oviedo	Loan return	Free	
30 June 2017	Urtzi Iriondo	Elche	Loan return	Free	
30 June 2017	Mikel Vesga	Sporting Gijón	Loan return	Free	
30 June 2017	Unai López	Leganés	Loan return	Free	
30 June 2017	Ager Aketxe	Cádiz	Loan return	Free	
30 June 2017	Kike Sola	Numancia	Loan return	Free	
30 June 2017	Gorka Santamaría	Cádiz	Loan return	Free	
30 June 2017	Asier Villalibre	Numancia	Loan return	Free	

==== Out ====
Date	Player	To	Type	Fee	Ref
14 June 2017	Gorka Iraizoz	Girona	Transfer	Free	
30 June 2017	Gorka Elustondo	Atlético Nacional	Transfer	Free	
1 July 2017	Urtzi Iriondo	Granada	Loan	Free	
7 July 2017	Markel Etxeberria	Numancia	Loan	Free	
21 July 2017	Álex Remiro	Huesca	Loan	Free	
24 July 2017	Javi Eraso	Leganés	Transfer	Free	
1 August 2017	Unai López	Rayo Vallecano	Loan	Free	
18 August 2017	Asier Villalibre	Valladolid	Loan	Free	
30 August 2017	Gorka Santamaría	Recreativo	Transfer	Free	

=== Atlético Madrid ===
Manager: Diego Simeone (7th season)

==== In ====
Date	Player	From	Type	Fee	Ref
30 June 2017	Guilherme Siqueira	Valencia	Loan return	Free	
30 June 2017	Matías Kranevitter	Sevilla	Loan return	Free	
30 June 2017	Théo Hernandez	Alavés	Loan return	Free	
30 June 2017	Javier Manquillo	Sunderland	Loan return	Free	
30 June 2017	Bernard Mensah	Vitória Guimarães	Loan return	Free	
30 June 2017	Diogo Jota	Porto	Loan return	Free	
30 June 2017	Luciano Vietto	Sevilla	Loan return	Free	
30 June 2017	Santos Borré	Villarreal	Loan return	Free	
30 June 2017	Axel Werner	Boca Juniors	Loan return	Free	
30 June 2017	Emiliano Velázquez	Braga	Loan return	Free	
30 June 2017	Amath	Tenerife	Loan return	Free	
13 July 2017	Vitolo	Sevilla	Transfer	€36M	

==== Out ====
Date	Player	To	Type	Fee	Ref
22 May 2017	Tiago Mendes	Retired			
30 June 2017	Alessio Cerci	Verona	Transfer	Free	
6 July 2017	Théo Hernandez	Real Madrid	Transfer	€26M	
13 July 2017	André Moreira	Braga	Loan	Free	
13 July 2017	Vitolo	Las Palmas	Loan	Undisclosed	
21 July 2017	Javier Manquillo	Newcastle United	Transfer	€5M	
24 July 2017	Bernard Mensah	Kasımpaşa	Loan	Free	
25 July 2017	Diogo Jota	Wolverhampton Wanderers	Loan	Free	
26 July 2017	Emiliano Velázquez	Getafe	Loan	Free	
7 August 2017	Santos Borré	River Plate	Transfer	€3M	
8 August 2017	Matías Kranevitter	Zenit St. Petersburg	Transfer	€8M	
10 August 2017	Amath	Getafe	Transfer	€3M	

=== Barcelona ===
Manager: Ernesto Valverde (1st season)

==== In ====
Date	Player	From	Type	Fee	Ref
30 June 2017	Douglas	Sporting Gijón	Loan return	Free	
30 June 2017	Thomas Vermaelen	Roma	Loan return	Free	
30 June 2017	Sergi Samper	Granada	Loan return	Free	
30 June 2017	Cristian Tello	Fiorentina	Loan return	Free	
30 June 2017	Munir El Haddadi	Valencia	Loan return	Free	
30 June 2017	Gerard Deulofeu	Everton	Transfer	€12M	
1 July 2017	Marlon	Fluminense	Transfer	€5M	
13 July 2017	Nélson Semedo	Benfica	Transfer	€30M	
14 August 2017	Paulinho	Guangzhou Evergrande	Transfer	€40M	
25 August 2017	Ousmane Dembélé	Borussia Dortmund	Transfer	€105M	

==== Out ====
Date	Player	To	Type	Fee	Ref
1 July 2017	Cristian Tello	Real Betis	Transfer	€4M	
7 July 2017	Jérémy Mathieu	Sporting CP	Transfer	Free	
17 July 2017	Jordi Masip	Valladolid	Transfer	Free	
3 August 2017	Neymar	Paris Saint-Germain	Transfer	€222M	
24 August 2017	Sergi Samper	Las Palmas	Loan	Free	
29 August 2017	Marlon	Nice	Loan	Free	
31 August 2017	Douglas	Benfica	Loan	Free	
1 Sepmtember	Munir El Haddadi	Alavés	Loan	Free	

=== Celta de Vigo ===
Manager: Juan Carlos Unzué (1st season)

==== In ====
Date	Player	From	Type	Fee	Ref
22 May 2017	Maxi Gómez	Defensor Sporting	Transfer	€4M	
30 June 2017	Álex López	Valladolid	Loan return	Free	
30 June 2017	David Costas	Oviedo	Loan return	Free	
30 June 2017	Lévy Madinda	Gimnàstic	Loan return	Free	
30 June 2017	Dejan Dražić	Valladolid	Loan return	Free	
30 June 2017	Pedro Martín	Mirandés	Loan return	Free	
1 July 2017	Ivan Villar	Celta B	Promoted		
4 July 2017	Jozabed	Fulham	Transfer	€3.5M	
15 July 2017	Stanislav Lobotka	FC Nordsjælland	Transfer	€5M	
29 August 2017	Emre Mor	Borussia Dortmund	Transfer	€13M	

==== Out ====
Date	Player	To	Type	Fee	Ref
22 June 2017	Lévy Madinda	Asteras Tripolis	Transfer	Free	
30 June 2017	Giuseppe Rossi	Fiorentina	Loan return	Free	
1 July 2017	Théo Bongonda	Trabzonspor	Loan	€400K	
4 July 2017	Álvaro Lemos	Lens	Loan	Free	
10 July 2017	Samu Araújo	Barcelona B	Loan	Free	
13 July 2017	Carles Planas	Girona	Transfer	Free	
20 July 2017	Josep Señé	Cultural Leonesa	Transfer	Undisclosed	
26 July 2017	Pedro Martín	Murcia	Transfer	Free	
17 August 2017	Marcelo Díaz	Pumas UNAM	Transfer	Free	
18 August 2017	Álex López	Sporting Gijón	Transfer	Free	
29 August 2017	Pape Cheikh	Lyon	Transfer	€10M	
29 August 2017	Claudio Beauvue	Leganés	Loan	Free	
31 August 2017	David Costas	Barcelona B	Loan	Free	

=== Deportivo La Coruña ===
Manager: Pepe Mel (2nd season)

==== In ====
Date	Player	From	Type	Fee	Ref
15 June 2017	Guilherme	Udinese	Transfer	€4.5M	
22 June 2017	Federico Valverde	Real Madrid B	Loan	Free	
30 June 2017	Oriol Riera	Osasuna	Loan return	Free	
30 June 2017	Rubén Martínez	Anderlecht	Loan Return	Free	
30 June 2017	Róber Pier	Levante	Loan return	Free	
30 June 2017	Saúl	Mallorca	Loan return	Free	
30 June 2017	Juan Domínguez	Mallorca	Loan return	Free	
30 June 2017	Bicho	Racing Ferrol	Loan return	Free	
30 June 2017	Borja Valle	Elche	Loan return	Free	
30 June 2017	Fede Cartabia	Braga	Loan return	Free	
12 July 2017	Gerard Valentín	Gimnàstic	Transfer	€600K	
15 July 2017	Zakaria Bakkali	Valencia	Loan	Free	
21 July 2017	Fabian Schär	1899 Hoffenheim	Transfer	€2M	
11 August 2017	Adrián López	Porto	Loan	Free	
31 August 2017	Lucas Pérez	Arsenal	Loan	€4M	
1 September 2017	Costel Pantilimon	Watford	Loan	Free	

==== Out ====
Date	Player	To	Type	Fee	Ref
26 June 2017	Germán Lux	River Plate	Transfer	Free	
29 June 2017	Pablo Ínsua	Schalke 04	Transfer	€3.5M	
30 June 2017	Joselu	Stoke City	Loan return	Free	
30 June 2017	Gaël Kakuta	Hebei China Fortune	Loan return	Free	
30 June 2017	Ola John	Benfica	Loan return	Free	
30 June 2017	Davy Roef	Anderlecht	Loan return	Free	
5 July 2017	Oriol Riera	Western Sydney Wanderers	Transfer	Free	
5 July 2017	Laure	Alcorcón	Transfer	Free	
10 July 2017	Álex Bergantiños	Sporting Gijón	Loan	Free	
20 July 2017	Fayçal Fajr	Getafe	Transfer	Free	
3 August 2017	Róber Pier	Levante	Loan	Free	
23 August 2017	Juan Domínguez	Reus	Transfer	Free	

=== Eibar ===
Manager: José Luis Mendilibar (3rd season)

==== In ====
Date	Player	From	Type	Fee	Ref
23 May 2017	Yoel Rodríguez	Valencia	Transfer	€750K	
14 June 2017	Iván Alejo	Alcorcón	Transfer	€300K	
23 June 2017	Marko Dmitrović	Alcorcón	Transfer	€1M	
30 June 2017	Pere Milla	UCAM Murcia	Loan return	Free	
30 June 2017	Unai Elgezabal	Alcorcón	Loan return	Free	
30 June 2017	Jordi Calavera	Lugo	Loan return	Free	
30 June 2017	Iñigo Barrenetxea	Sestao	Loan return	Free	
30 June 2017	Jon Ander Felipe	Llagostera	Loan return	Free	
30 June 2017	Jon Ander Amelibia	Logroñés	Loan return	Free	
30 June 2017	Sergio García	Logroñés	Loan return	Free	
30 June 2017	Juanfran	Logroñés	Loan return	Free	
30 June 2017	Thaylor	Real Unión	Loan return	Free	
30 June 2017	Roger Escoruela	Real Unión	Loan return	Free	
4 July 2017	Charles	Málaga	Transfer	Free	
5 July 2017	Pablo Hervías	Real Sociedad	Transfer	Free	
13 July 2017	Joan Jordán	Espanyol	Transfer	€100K	
14 July 2017	José Ángel	Porto	Transfer	Free	
17 July 2017	Paulo Oliveira	Sporting CP	Transfer	€3.5M	

==== Out ====
Date	Player	To	Type	Fee	Ref
23 May 2017	Adrián González	Málaga	Transfer	Free	
8 June 2017	Antonio Luna	Levante	Transfer	Free	
1 July 2017	Roger Escoruela	Vitoria	Reserve team		
1 July 2017	Jon Ander Amelibia	Vitoria	Reserve team		
4 July 2017	Florian Lejeune	Newcastle United	Transfer	€10M	
6 July 2017	Pere Milla	Numancia	Loan	Free	
7 July 2017	Sergio García	Barakaldo	Transfer	Free	
11 July 2017	Mauro dos Santos	Leganés	Transfer	Free	
12 July 2017	Pablo Hervías	Valladolid	Loan	Free	
18 July 2017	Jon Ander Felipe	Toledo	Transfer	Free	
16 August 2017	Unai Elgezabal	Numancia	Loan	Free	
28 August 2017	Juanfran	Marbella	Transfer	Free	
28 August 2017	Jordi Calavera	Sporting Gijón	Loan	Free	
31 August 2017	Thaylor	Caudal	Transfer	Free	
1 September 2017	Nano	Levante	Loan	Free	

=== Espanyol ===
Manager: Quique Sánchez Flores (2nd season)

==== In ====
Date	Player	From	Type	Fee	Ref
23 May 2017	Diego López	Milan	Transfer	€1M	
24 May 2017	Pablo Piatti	Valencia	Transfer	€1.5M	
16 June 2017	Sergio García	Al-Rayyan	Transfer	Free	
30 June 2017	Pau López	Tottenham Hotspur	Loan return	Free	
30 June 2017	Paco Montañés	Levante	Loan return	Free	
30 June 2017	Jairo Morillas	Numancia	Loan return	Free	
30 June 2017	Joan Jordán	Valladolid	Loan return	Free	
30 June 2017	Rober Correa	Elche	Loan return	Free	
1 July 2017	Óscar Melendo	Espanyol B	Promoted		
7 July 2017	Esteban Granero	Real Sociedad	Transfer	Free	
12 July 2017	Mario Hermoso	Real Madrid B	Transfer	€300K	
10 August 2017	Naldo	FC Krasnodar	Transfer	€2.5M	
30 August 2017	Dídac Vilà	AEK Athens	Transfer	€250K	
31 August 2017	Sergi Darder	Lyon	Loan	€300K	
1 September 2017	Sergio Sánchez	Rubin Kazan	Loan	Free	

==== Out ====
Date	Player	To	Type	Fee	Ref
22 May 2017	Mamadou Sylla	Eupen	Transfer	€2.3M	
22 May 2017	José Antonio Reyes	TBD		Free	
29 May 2017	Rubén Duarte	Alavés	Transfer	€400K	
30 June 2017	Diego Reyes	Porto	Loan return	Free	
5 July 2017	Roberto	Málaga	Loan	Free	
13 July 2017	Joan Jordán	Eibar	Transfer	€100K	
20 July 2017	Víctor Álvarez	Arsenal Tula	Transfer	Free	
2 August 2017	Felipe Caicedo	Lazio	Transfer	€2.5M	
7 August 2017	Rober Correa	Cádiz	Transfer	Free	
16 August 2017	Paco Montañés	Tenerife	Transfer	Free	
28 August 2017	Salva Sevilla	Mallorca	Transfer	Free	

=== Getafe ===
Manager: José Bordalás (2nd season)

==== In ====
Date	Player	From	Type	Fee	Ref
30 June 2017	Rolf Feltscher	Zaragoza	Loan return	Free	
30 June 2017	van den Bergh	Greuther Fürth	Loan return	Free	
30 June 2017	Yoda	Almería	Loan return	Free	
1 July 2017	Francisco Portillo	Betis	Transfer	€1.5M	
1 July 2017	Dani Pacheco	Betis	Transfer	€1M	
1 July 2017	Álvaro Jiménez	Real Madrid B	Transfer	€1M	
1 July 2017	Chuli	Almería	Transfer	€700K	
5 July 2017	Bruno	Betis	Transfer	€600K	
6 July 2017	Ángel Rodríguez	Zaragoza	Transfer	Free	
17 July 2017	Gaku Shibasaki	Tenerife	Transfer	Free	
18 July 2017	Markel Bergara	Real Sociedad	Loan	Free	
20 July 2017	Fayçal Fajr	Deportivo La Coruña	Transfer	Free	
21 July 2017	Filip Manojlović	Red Star Belgrade	Transfer	€1.25M	
21 July 2017	Vitorino Antunes	Dynamo Kyiv	Loan	Free	
24 July 2017	Djené	Sint-Truidense	Transfer	€2.5M	
26 July 2017	Emiliano Velázquez	Atlético Madrid	Loan	Free	
2 August 2017	Emiliano Martínez	Arsenal	Loan	Free	
9 August 2017	Mauro Arambarri	Boston River	Loan	Free	
14 August 2017	Mathías Olivera	Nacional	Transfer	Free	
17 August 2017	Rubén Yáñez	Real Madrid	Transfer	Free	
1 September 2017	Jefferson Montero	Swansea City	Loan	Free	

==== Out ====
Date	Player	To	Type	Fee	Ref
30 June 2017	Facundo Castillón	Racing Club	Loan return	Free	
30 June 2017	Paul Anton	Dinamo București	Loan return	Free	
1 July 2017	David Fuster	Retired			
12 July 2017	Stefan Šćepović	Sporting Gijón	Loan	Free	
13 July 2017	Alberto García	Rayo Vallecano	Loan	Free	
19 July 2017	Carlos Peña	Lorca	Transfer	Free	
21 July 2017	Alejandro Faurlín	Cruz Azul	Transfer	Undisclosed	
27 July 2017	Emi Buendía	Cultural Leonesa	Loan	Free	
18 August 2017	Rubén Yáñez	Cádiz	Loan	Free	
24 August 2017	Rolf Feltscher	TBD		Free	
31 August 2017	van den Bergh	Holstein Kiel	Transfer	Free	
1 September 2017	Cata Díaz	Fuenlabrada	Transfer	Free	

=== Girona ===
Manager: Pablo Machín (5th season)

==== In ====
Date	Player	From	Type	Fee	Ref
14 June 2017	Gorka Iraizoz	Athletic Bilbao	Transfer	Free	
30 June 2017	Carles Mas	Gavà	Loan return	Free	
30 June 2017	Albert Vivancos	Llagostera	Loan return	Free	
30 June 2017	David Oliveros	Hospitalet	Loan return	Free	
7 July 2017	Bernardo Espinosa	Middlesbrough	Transfer	€4.5M	
8 July 2017	José Aurelio Suárez	Barcelona B	Transfer	Free	
13 July 2017	Carles Planas	Celta	Transfer	Free	
21 July 2017	Cristhian Stuani	Middlesbrough	Transfer	Undisclosed	
25 July 2017	Farid Boulaya	Bastia	Transfer	Undisclosed	
31 July 2017	Pablo Maffeo	Manchester City	Loan	Free	
1 August 2017	Aleix García	Manchester City	Loan	Free	
1 August 2017	Marlos Moreno	Manchester City	Loan	Free	
1 August 2017	Douglas Luiz	Manchester City	Loan	Free	
11 August 2017	Marc Muniesa	Stoke City	Loan	Free	
17 August 2017	Olarenwaju Kayode	Manchester City	Loan	Free	
18 August 2017	Johan Mojica	Rayo Vallecano	Loan	Free	
1 September 2017	Michael Olunga	Guizhou Zhicheng	Loan	Free	
1 September 2017	David Timor	Leganés	Transfer	Free	

==== Out ====
Date	Player	To	Type	Fee	Ref
13 June 2017	Richy	Retired			
13 June 2017	Felipe Sanchón	Sabadell	Transfer	Free	
17 June 2017	Carles Mas	Olot	Transfer	Free	
30 June 2017	Pablo Marí	Manchester City	Loan return	Free	
30 June 2017	Pablo Maffeo	Manchester City	Loan return	Free	
30 June 2017	Cifu	Málaga	Loan return	Free	
30 June 2017	Juan Cámara	Barcelona B	Loan return	Free	
30 June 2017	Johan Mojica	Rayo Vallecano	Loan return	Free	
30 June 2017	Samuele Longo	Internazionale	Loan return	Free	
1 July 2017	Sebas Coris	Osasuna	Loan	Free	
5 July 2017	René	Almería	Transfer	Free	
11 July 2017	Rubén Alcaraz	Almería	Loan	Free	
14 July 2017	Cristian Herrera	Lugo	Transfer	Free	
17 July 2017	Fran Sandaza	Al Ahli	Loan	Free	
22 July 2017	Albert Vivancos	UCAM Murcia	Transfer	Free	
23 July 2017	David Oliveros	Lleida Esportiu	Transfer	Free	
22 August 2017	Kiko Olivas	Valladolid	Transfer	Free	

=== Las Palmas ===
Manager: Manolo Márquez (1st season)

==== In ====
Date	Player	From	Type	Fee	Ref
19 June 2017	Ximo Navarro	Almería	Transfer	Free	
29 June 2017	Leandro Chichizola	Spezia	Transfer	Free	
30 June 2017	Sergio Araujo	AEK Athens	Loan return	Free	
30 June 2017	Héctor Figueroa	Ponferradina	Loan return	Free	
30 June 2017	Tyronne	Tenerife	Loan return	Free	
30 June 2017	Ortuño	Cádiz	Loan return	Free	
1 July 2017	Borja Herrera	Las Palmas B	Promoted		
11 July 2017	Jonathan Calleri	Deportivo Maldonado	Loan	Free	
11 July 2017	Hernán Toledo	Deportivo Maldonado	Loan	Free	
13 July 2017	Vitolo	Atlético Madrid	Loan	Undisclosed	
24 August 2017	Sergi Samper	Barcelona	Loan	Free	
25 August 2017	Alberto Aquilani	Pescara	Transfer	Free	
1 September 2017	Loïc Rémy	Chelsea	Transfer	Free	
1 September 2017	Oussama Tannane	Saint-Étienne	Loan	Free	

==== Out ====
Date	Player	To	Type	Fee	Ref
13 June 2017	Javi Varas	Granada	Transfer	Free	
21 June 2017	Hélder Lopes	AEK Athens	Transfer	Free	
30 June 2017	Jesé	Paris Saint-Germain	Loan return	Free	
1 July 2017	Marko Livaja	AEK Athens	Loan	€200K	
6 July 2017	Roque Mesa	Swansea City	Transfer	€12.5M	
8 July 2017	Héctor Figueroa	Toledo	Transfer	Free	
13 July 2017	Mateo García	Osasuna	Loan	Free	
15 July 2017	Montoro	Granada	Transfer	Free	
15 July 2017	Tyronne	Tenerife	Transfer	Free	
18 August 2017	Kevin-Prince Boateng	Eintracht Frankfurt	Transfer	Free	
31 August 2017	Sergio Araujo	AEK Athens	Loan	€500K	

=== Leganés ===
Manager: Asier Garitano (5th season)

==== In ====
Date	Player	From	Type	Fee	Ref
5 June 2017	Raúl García	Alavés	Transfer	Free	
1 July 2017	Dimitris Siovas	Olympiacos	Transfer	€3M	
1 July 2017	Tito	Granada	Transfer	€600K	
4 July 2017	Joseba Zaldúa	Real Sociedad	Loan	Free	
5 July 2017	Iván Cuéllar	Sporting Gijón	Transfer	Free	
11 July 2017	Mauro dos Santos	Eibar	Transfer	Free	
12 July 2017	Gerard Gumbau	Barcelona B	Transfer	Free	
24 July 2017	Javi Eraso	Athletic Bilbao	Transfer	Free	
25 July 2017	Nereo Champagne	Olimpo	Loan	Free	
8 August 2017	Ezequiel Muñoz	Genoa	Transfer	€2.5M	
29 August 2017	Claudio Beauvue	Celta	Loan	Free	
23 August 2017	Owusu Kwabena	Sporting Club Accra	Transfer	Undisclosed	
30 August 2017	Darko Brašanac	Betis	Loan	Free	
31 August 2017	Josua Mejías	Carabobo	Transfer	Undisclosed	
1 September 2017	Nordin Amrabat	Watford	Loan	Free	
1 September 2017	José Naranjo	Genk	Loan	Free	

==== Out ====
Date	Player	To	Type	Fee	Ref
30 June 2017	Unai López	Athletic Bilbao	Loan return	Free	
30 June 2017	Robert Ibáñez	Valencia	Loan return	Free	
30 June 2017	Nereo Champagne	Olimpo	Loan return	Free	
30 June 2017	Alberto Bueno	Porto	Loan return	Free	
30 June 2017	Adrián Marín	Villarreal	Loan return	Free	
30 June 2017	Luciano	Corinthians	Loan return	Free	
30 June 2017	Pablo Ínsua	Deportivo La Coruña	Loan return	Free	
30 June 2017	Darwin Machís	Granada	Loan return	Free	
30 June 2017	Iago Herrerín	Athletic Bilbao	Loan return	Free	
30 June 2017	Samu García	Rubin Kazan	Loan return	Free	
4 July 2017	Víctor Díaz	Granada	Transfer	Free	
7 July 2017	Alberto Martín	Granada	Transfer	Free	
1 September 2017	David Timor	Girona	Transfer	Free	
1 September 2017	Owusu Kwabena	Oviedo	Loan	Free	
1 September 2017	Josua Mejías	Cartagena	Loan	Free	

=== Levante ===
Manager: Juan Muñiz (2nd season)

==== In ====
Date	Player	From	Type	Fee	Ref
8 June 2017	Antonio Luna	Eibar	Transfer	Free	
30 June 2017	Víctor Camarasa	Alavés	Loan return	Free	
30 June 2017	Juan Delgado	Hércules	Loan return	Free	
30 June 2017	Deyverson	Alavés	Loan return	Free	
30 June 2017	Álvaro Traver	Logroñés	Loan return	Free	
1 July 2017	Koke	Levante B	Promoted		
1 July 2017	Oier	Granada	Transfer	€200K	
1 July 2017	Álex Alegría	Betis	Loan	Free	
17 July 2017	Enis Bardhi	Újpest	Transfer	€1.5M	
3 August 2017	Róber Pier	Deportivo La Coruña	Loan	Free	
4 August 2017	Cheick Doukouré	Metz	Transfer	€1.6M	
7 August 2017	Ivi	Sevilla B	Transfer	€1.2M	
15 August 2017	Saša Lukić	Torino	Loan	Free	
16 August 2017	Emmanuel Boateng	Moreirense	Transfer	€2M	
24 August 2017	Samu García	Rubin Kazan	Transfer	Free	
30 August 2017	Mitchell Langerak	VfB Stuttgart	Transfer	€800K	
1 September 2017	Nano Mesa	Eibar	Loan	Free	
1 September 2017	Erick Cabaco	Nacional	Loan	Free	

==== Out ====
Date	Player	To	Type	Fee	Ref
6 June 2017	Natxo Insa	Johor Darul Ta'zim	Transfer	€400K	
30 June 2017	Paco Montañés	Espanyol	Loan return	Free	
30 June 2017	Abraham Minero	Zaragoza	Loan return	Free	
30 June 2017	Juan Muñoz	Sevilla	Loan return	Free	
30 June 2017	Róber Pier	Deportivo La Coruña	Loan return	Free	
1 July 2017	Víctor Camarasa	Betis	Transfer	€7M	
5 July 2017	Víctor Casadesús	Tenerife	Transfer	Free	
12 July 2017	Deyverson	Palmeiras	Transfer	€5M	
28 July 2017	Rubén García	Sporting Gijón	Loan	Free	
4 August 2017	Esteban Saveljich	Albacete	Loan	Free	
7 August 2017	Javi Espinosa	Granada	Loan	Free	
30 August 2017	Koke	Alcoyano	Loan	Free	
31 August 2017	Verza	Almería	Loan	Free	

=== Málaga ===
Manager: Míchel (2nd season)

==== In ====
Date	Player	From	Type	Fee	Ref
23 May 2017	Adrián González	Eibar	Transfer	Free	
27 June 2017	Paul Baysse	Nice	Transfer	Free	
30 June 2017	Guillermo Ochoa	Granada	Loan return	Free	
30 June 2017	Cifu	Girona	Loan return	Free	
30 June 2017	Ricardo Horta	Braga	Loan return	Free	
30 June 2017	Adnane Tighadouini	Vitesse	Loan return	Free	
1 July 2017	Luis Muñoz	Málaga B	Promoted		
4 July 2017	Andrés Prieto	Espanyol B	Transfer	Free	
4 July 2017	Borja Bastón	Swansea City	Loan	Free	
5 July 2017	Roberto	Espanyol	Loan	Free	
19 July 2017	Cenk Gönen	Galatasaray	Transfer	€200K	
19 July 2017	Juankar	Braga	Transfer	Free	
27 July 2017	Emanuel Cecchini	Banfield	Transfer	€4M	
3 August 2017	Diego González	Sevilla B	Transfer	€2M	
25 August 2017	Esteban Rolón	Argentinos Juniors	Transfer	€3.2M	
27 August 2017	Diego Rolán	Bordeaux	Loan	Free	

==== Out ====
Date	Player	To	Type	Fee	Ref
22 May 2017	Martín Demichelis	Retired			
22 May 2017	Duda	Retired			
22 May 2017	Weligton	Retired			
30 June 2017	Diego Llorente	Real Madrid	Loan return	Free	
30 June 2017	Juankar	Braga	Loan return	Free	
30 June 2017	José Rodríguez	Mainz 05	Loan return	Free	
30 June 2017	Denys Boyko	Beşiktaş	Loan return	Free	
3 July 2017	Sandro	Everton	Transfer	€6M	
4 July 2017	Charles	Eibar	Transfer	Free	
5 July 2017	Carlos Kameni	Fenerbahçe	Transfer	Free	
8 July 2017	Ignacio Camacho	VfL Wolfsburg	Transfer	€15M	
9 July 2017	Guillermo Ochoa	Standard Liège	Transfer	Free	
18 July 2017	Ricardo Horta	Braga	Transfer	Free	
24 July 2017	Pablo Fornals	Villarreal	Transfer	€12M	
10 August 2017	Mikel Villanueva	Cádiz	Loan	Free	
14 August 2017	Michael Santos	Sporting Gijón	Loan	Free	
23 August 2017	Adnane Tighadouini	Twente	Loan	Free	
26 August 2017	Bakary Koné	Strasbourg	Loan	Free	
29 August 2017	Luis Muñoz	Lugo	Loan	Free	

=== Real Betis ===
Manager: Quique Setién (1st season)

==== In ====
Date	Player	From	Type	Fee	Ref
30 June 2017	Fabián	Elche	Loan return	Free	
30 June 2017	Didier Digard	Osasuna	Loan return	Free	
30 June 2017	Sergio León	Osasuna	Transfer	€3.5M	
1 July 2017	Víctor Camarasa	Levante	Transfer	€7M	
1 July 2017	Cristian Tello	Barcelona	Transfer	€4M	
6 July 2017	Antonio Barragán	Middlesbrough	Loan	Free	
7 July 2017	Jordi Amat	Swansea City	Loan	Free	
7 July 2017	Andrés Guardado	PSV	Transfer	€2.5M	
24 July 2017	Zouhair Feddal	Alavés	Transfer	€2.5M	
9 August 2017	Ryad Boudebouz	Montpellier	Transfer	€7M	
14 August 2017	Javi García	Zenit	Transfer	€1.5M	
18 August 2017	Juan Narváez	Betis B	Promoted		
31 August 2017	Joel Campbell	Arsenal	Loan	Free	

==== Out ====
Date	Player	To	Type	Fee	Ref
22 May 2017	Cristiano Piccini	Sporting CP	Transfer	€3M	
28 June 2017	Álex Martínez	Granada	Transfer	Free	
29 June 2017	Petros	São Paulo	Transfer	€2.5M	
30 June 2017	Ryan Donk	Galatasaray	Loan return	Free	
30 June 2017	Rubén Pardo	Real Sociedad	Loan return	Free	
1 July 2017	Álex Alegría	Levante	Loan	Free	
1 July 2017	Francisco Portillo	Getafe	Transfer	€1.5M	
1 July 2017	Dani Pacheco	Getafe	Transfer	€1M	
5 July 2017	Bruno González	Getafe	Transfer	€600K	
11 July 2017	Rubén Castro	Guizhou Zhicheng	Loan	Free	
14 July 2017	Dani Ceballos	Real Madrid	Transfer	€17M	
24 July 2017	Álvaro Cejudo	Western Sydney Wanderers	Transfer	Free	
25 July 2017	Jonas Martin	Strasbourg	Transfer	€1.5M	
3 August 2017	Manu Herrera	Osasuna	Transfer	Free	
18 August 2017	Germán Pezzella	Fiorentina	Loan	€500K	
30 August 2017	Darko Brašanac	Leganés	Loan	Free	
31 August 2017	Didier Digard	TBD		Free	
1 September 2017	Roman Zozulya	TBD		Free	

=== Real Madrid ===
Manager: Zinedine Zidane (3rd season)

==== In ====
Date	Player	From	Type	Fee	Ref
30 June 2017	Burgui	Sporting Gijón	Loan return	Free	
30 June 2017	Diego Llorente	Málaga	Loan return	Free	
30 June 2017	Marcos Llorente	Alavés	Loan return	Free	
30 June 2017	Jesús Vallejo	Eintracht Frankfurt	Loan return	Free	
30 June 2017	Borja Mayoral	VfL Wolfsburg	Loan return	Free	
6 July 2017	Théo Hernandez	Atlético de Madrid	Transfer	€30M	
14 July 2017	Dani Ceballos	Betis	Transfer	€17M	
18 August 2017	Achraf Hakimi	Real Madrid B	Promoted		

==== Out ====
Date	Player	To	Type	Fee	Ref
29 June 2017	Enzo Fernández	Alavés	Transfer	Free	
30 June 2017	Mariano	Lyon	Transfer	€8M	
1 July 2017	Diego Llorente	Real Sociedad	Transfer	€6M	
4 July 2017	Pepe	Beşiktaş	Transfer	Free	
5 July 2017	Fábio Coentrão	Sporting CP	Loan	Free	
11 July 2017	James Rodríguez	Bayern Munich	Loan	€10M	
11 July 2017	Burgui	Alavés	Transfer	€3M	
21 July 2017	Álvaro Morata	Chelsea	Transfer	€65M	
23 July 2017	Danilo	Manchester City	Transfer	€30M	
17 August 2017	Rubén Yáñez	Getafe	Transfer	Free	

=== Real Sociedad ===
Manager: Eusebio Sacristán (3rd season)

==== In ====
Date	Player	From	Type	Fee	Ref
30 June 2017	Rubén Pardo	Betis	Loan return	Free	
30 June 2017	Alain Oyarzun	Mirandés	Loan return	Free	
30 June 2017	Srđan Babić	Reus	Loan return	Free	
30 June 2017	Pablo Hervías	Elche	Loan return	Free	
30 June 2017	Héctor	Granada	Loan return	Free	
30 June 2017	Eneko Capilla	Numancia	Loan return	Free	
1 July 2017	Kévin Rodrigues	Real Sociedad B	Promoted		
1 July 2017	Igor Zubeldia	Real Sociedad B	Promoted		
1 July 2017	Jon Bautista	Real Sociedad B	Promoted		
1 July 2017	Álvaro Odriozola	Real Sociedad B	Promoted		
1 July 2017	Diego Llorente	Real Madrid	Transfer	€6M	
12 July 2017	Adnan Januzaj	Manchester United	Transfer	€8.5M	

==== Out ====
Date	Player	To	Type	Fee	Ref
12 June 2017	Héctor	Alavés	Loan	Free	
4 July 2017	Joseba Zaldúa	Leganés	Loan	Free	
5 July 2017	Pablo Hervías	Eibar	Transfer	Free	
6 July 2017	Alain Oyarzun	Zaragoza	Transfer	Free	
7 July 2017	Esteban Granero	Espanyol	Transfer	Free	
7 July 2017	Yuri Berchiche	Paris Saint-Germain	Transfer	€16M	
7 July 2017	Srđan Babić	Red Star Belgrade	Loan	Free	
18 July 2017	Markel Bergara	Getafe	Loan	Free	
24 July 2017	Ander Bardají	Huesca	Transfer	Free	
11 August 2017	David Concha	Barcelona B	Loan	Free	
22 August 2017	Jon Gaztañaga	Gimnàstic	Transfer	Free	
29 August 2017	Mikel González	Zaragoza	Transfer	Free	

=== Sevilla ===
Manager: Eduardo Berizzo (1st season)

==== In ====
Date	Player	From	Type	Fee	Ref
30 June 2017	Juan Muñoz	Levante	Loan return	Free	
1 July 2017	Borja Lasso	Sevilla B	Promoted		
3 July 2017	Éver Banega	Internazionale	Transfer	€9M	
8 July 2017	Luis Muriel	Sampdoria	Transfer	€20M	
9 July 2017	Guido Pizarro	UANL	Transfer	€6M	
13 July 2017	Sébastien Corchia	Lille	Transfer	€5M	
16 July 2017	Nolito	Manchester City	Transfer	€9M	
1 August 2017	Jesús Navas	Manchester City	Transfer	Free	
2 August 2017	Simon Kjær	Fenerbahçe	Transfer	€12.5M	
31 August 2017	Lionel Carole	Galatasaray	Loan	€350K	
1 September 2017	Johannes Geis	Schalke 04	Loan	€2M	

==== Out ====
Date	Player	To	Type	Fee	Ref
22 May 2017	Benoît Trémoulinas	TBD		Free	
30 June 2017	Matías Kranevitter	Atlético Madrid	Loan return	Free	
30 June 2017	Stevan Jovetić	Inter Milan	Loan return	Free	
30 June 2017	Luciano Vietto	Atlético Madrid	Loan return	Free	
30 June 2017	Samir Nasri	Manchester City	Loan return	Free	
1 July 2017	Yevhen Konoplyanka	Schalke 04	Transfer	€12.5M	
1 July 2017	Sebastián Cristóforo	Fiorentina	Transfer	€2.5M	
6 July 2017	Vicente Iborra	Leicester City	Transfer	€12M	
12 July 2017	Vitolo	Atlético Madrid	Transfer	€36M	
13 July 2017	Adil Rami	Marseille	Transfer	€6M	
17 July 2017	Mariano	Galatasaray	Transfer	€4M	
8 August 2017	Juan Muñoz	Almería	Loan	Free	

=== Valencia ===
Manager: Marcelino (1st season)

==== In ====
Date	Player	From	Type	Fee	Ref
22 May 2017	Nemanja Maksimović	Astana	Transfer	Free	
30 May 2017	Fabián Orellana	Celta Vigo	Transfer	€3M	
30 June 2017	Mathew Ryan	Genk	Loan return	Free	
30 June 2017	Rúben Vezo	Granada	Loan return	Free	
30 June 2017	Nando	Oviedo	Loan return	Free	
30 June 2017	Vinícius Araújo	Huesca	Loan return	Free	
30 June 2017	Tropi	Alcorcón	Loan return	Free	
30 June 2017	Robert Ibáñez	Leganés	Loan return	Free	
30 June 2017	Álvaro Negredo	Middlesbrough	Loan return	Free	
1 July 2017	Toni Lato	Valencia B	Promoted		
1 July 2017	Nacho Gil	Valencia B	Promoted		
1 July 2017	Nacho Vidal	Valencia B	Promoted		
1 July 2017	Simone Zaza	Juventus	Transfer	€16M	
7 July 2017	Neto	Juventus	Transfer	€6M	
18 August 2017	Gabriel	Arsenal	Transfer	€11M	
18 August 2017	Jeison Murillo	Inter Milan	Loan	Free	
21 August 2017	Geoffrey Kondogbia	Inter Milan	Loan	Free	
1 September 2017	Gonçalo Guedes	Paris Saint-Germain	Loan	Free	
1 September 2017	Andreas Pereira	Manchester United	Loan	Free	

==== Out ====
Date	Player	To	Type	Fee	Ref
23 May 2017	Yoel Rodríguez	Eibar	Transfer	€750K	
16 June 2017	Mathew Ryan	Brighton & Hove Albion	Transfer	€6M	
28 June 2017	Enzo Pérez	River Plate	Transfer	€5M	
30 June 2017	Guilherme Siqueira	Atlético Madrid	Loan return	Free	
30 June 2017	Eliaquim Mangala	Manchester City	Loan return	Free	
30 June 2017	Munir El Haddadi	Barcelona	Loan return	Free	
30 June 2017	Mario Suárez	Watford	Loan return	Free	
1 July 2017	Pablo Piatti	Espanyol	Transfer	€1.3M	
11 July 2017	Tropi	Lorca	Loan	Free	
14 July 2017	Zakaria Bakkali	Deportivo La Coruña	Loan	Free	
15 July 2017	Aderlan Santos	São Paulo	Loan	€800K	
16 July 2017	Diego Alves	Flamengo	Transfer	€300K	
4 August 2017	Álvaro Negredo	Beşiktaş	Transfer	€2.5M	
21 August 2017	João Cancelo	Inter Milan	Loan	Free	
26 August 2017	Nando	Alavés	Transfer	Free	
29 August 2017	Aymen Abdennour	Marseille	Loan	Free	
31 August 2017	Nani	Lazio	Loan	€2M	
1 September 2017	Vinícius Araújo	Zaragoza	Transfer	Free	
1 September 2017	Álvaro Medrán	Alavés	Loan	Free	

=== Villarreal ===
Manager: Fran Escribá (2nd season)

==== In ====
Date	Player	From	Type	Fee	Ref
31 May 2017	Enes Ünal	Manchester City	Transfer	€14M	
7 June 2017	Rúben Semedo	Sporting CP	Transfer	€14M	
21 June 2017	Andrés Fernández	Porto	Transfer	€2M	
30 June 2017	Akram Afif	Sporting Gijón	Loan return	Free	
30 June 2017	Alfonso Pedraza	Leeds United	Loan return	Free	
30 June 2017	Pablo Íñiguez	Rayo Vallecano	Loan return	Free	
30 June 2017	Cristian Espinoza	Valladolid	Loan return	Free	
30 June 2017	Adrián Marín	Leganés	Loan return	Free	
30 June 2017	Alfred N'Diaye	Hull City	Loan return	Free	
1 July 2017	Leo Suárez	Villarreal B	Promoted		
24 July 2017	Pablo Fornals	Málaga	Transfer	€12M	
16 August 2017	Carlos Bacca	Milan	Loan	€2.5M	

==== Out ====
Date	Player	To	Type	Fee	Ref
30 May 2017	Mateo Musacchio	Milan	Transfer	€18M	
30 June 2017	Adrián López	Porto	Loan return	Free	
30 June 2017	José Ángel	Porto	Loan return	Free	
30 June 2017	Santos Borré	Atlético Madrid	Loan return	Free	
5 July 2017	Alfonso Pedraza	Alavés	Loan	Free	
12 July 2017	Pablo Íñiguez	Reus	Transfer	Free	
14 July 2017	Akram Afif	Eupen	Loan	Free	
18 July 2017	Cristian Espinoza	Boca Juniors	Loan	Free	
28 July 2017	Jonathan dos Santos	LA Galaxy	Transfer	€4.3M	
9 August 2017	Roberto Soldado	Fenerbahçe	Transfer	€5M	
31 August 2017	Alfred N'Diaye	Wolverhampton Wanderers	Loan	Free	

== Segunda División ==
=== Albacete ===
Manager: José Manuel Aira (2nd season)

==== In ====
Date	Player	From	Type	Fee	Ref
29 June 2017	Danny Carvajal	Saprissa	Transfer	Free	
30 June 2017	Jona	UCAM Murcia	Loan return	Free	
30 June 2017	Manuel Miquel	Socuéllamos	Loan return	Free	
30 June 2017	Eneko Eizmendi	Pontevedra	Loan return	Free	
1 July 2017	Iván Sánchez	Almería	Transfer	Free	
2 July 2017	Quim Araújo	Valencia Mestalla	Transfer	Free	
6 July 2017	David Morillas	UCAM Murcia	Transfer	Free	
2 August 2017	Chus Herrero	Anorthosis	Transfer	Free	
2 August 2017	Jérémie Bela	Dijon	Transfer	Free	
2 August 2017	Néstor Susaeta	Oviedo	Transfer	Free	
3 August 2017	Jon Erice	Oviedo	Transfer	Free	
4 August 2017	Esteban Saveljich	Levante	Loan	Free	
7 August 2017	Mariano Bíttolo	Córdoba	Transfer	Free	
7 August 2017	Fabián Espíndola	Necaxa	Transfer	Free	
28 August 2017	Pelayo	CFR Cluj	Transfer	Free	
30 August 2017	César de la Hoz	Betis B	Loan	Free	
1 September 2017	Nili Perdomo	Barcelona B	Transfer	Free	
1 September 2017	Héctor Hernández	Atlético Madrid	Loan	Free	

==== Out ====
Date	Player	To	Type	Fee	Ref
30 June 2017	Héctor Hernández	Atlético Madrid	Loan return	Free	
1 July 2017	Mode	TBD		Free	
2 July 2017	Jona	Córdoba	Transfer	€400K	
28 July 2017	Manuel Miquel	Jumilla	Transfer	Free	
1 August 2017	Fran Carnicer	Murcia	Loan	Free	
4 August 2017	Héctor Pizana	Guijuelo	Loan	Free	
4 August 2017	Iván Sánchez	Elche	Loan	Free	
6 August 2017	Isaac Aketxe	Cartagena	Loan	Free	
11 August 2017	Diego Manzano	Guijuelo	Transfer	Free	
14 August 2017	Cristian Galas	Alcoyano	Loan	Free	
16 August 2017	Sergio Molina	Navalcarnero	Loan	Free	
28 August 2017	Eneko Eizmendi	UCAM Murcia	Transfer	Free	
31 August 2017	Javi Noblejas	Rayo Vallecano	Transfer	Free	
31 August 2017	Eloy Gila	Mirandés	Loan	Free	

=== Alcorcón ===
Manager: Julio Velázquez (2nd season)

==== In ====
Date	Player	From	Type	Fee	Ref
21 June 2017	Albert Dorca	Elche	Transfer	Free	
22 June 2017	Nono	UCAM Murcia	Transfer	Free	
23 June 2017	Casto	Almería	Transfer	Free	
30 June 2017	Samu Delgado	Cultural Leonesa	Loan return	Free	
30 June 2017	Víctor Pastrana	Ponferradina	Loan return	Free	
30 June 2017	Adrián Diéguez	Fuenlabrada	Loan return	Free	
30 June 2017	Fernando	Hércules	Loan return	Free	
30 June 2017	Luis Milla	Fuenlabrada	Loan return	Free	
30 June 2017	Adrián Jiménez	Toledo	Loan return	Free	
1 July 2017	Hugo Álvarez	UCAM Murcia	Transfer	Free	
4 July 2017	Marco Sangalli	Mirandés	Transfer	Free	
5 July 2017	Álvaro Peña	Racing Santander	Transfer	Free	
5 July 2017	Laure	Deportivo La Coruña	Transfer	Free	
6 July 2017	Borja Domínguez	Córdoba	Transfer	€100K	
6 July 2017	Borja Lázaro	Huesca	Transfer	Undisclosed	
7 July 2017	Esteban Burgos	Godoy Cruz	Transfer	Free	
8 July 2017	Jonathan Pereira	Oviedo	Transfer	Free	
8 July 2017	César Soriano	Huesca	Transfer	Free	
9 July 2017	Felipe Alfonso	Villarreal B	Transfer	Free	
11 July 2017	Jon Errasti	Spezia	Transfer	Free	
14 July 2017	David Fernández	Oviedo	Transfer	Free	
1 August 2017	Nicolao Dumitru	Napoli	Transfer	Free	

==== Out ====
Date	Player	To	Type	Fee	Ref
14 June 2017	Iván Alejo	Eibar	Transfer	€300K	
23 June 2017	Marko Dmitrović	Eibar	Transfer	€1M	
29 June 2017	David Rodríguez	Osasuna	Transfer	€350K	
30 June 2017	Pablo Pérez	Sporting Gijón	Loan return	Free	
30 June 2017	Carlos Luque	Internacional	Loan return	Free	
30 June 2017	Tropi	Valencia	Loan return	Free	
30 June 2017	Víctor Pérez	Valladolid	Loan return	Free	
30 June 2017	Unai Elgezabal	Eibar	Loan return	Free	
30 June 2017	Marko Bakić	Braga	Loan return	Free	
1 July 2017	Óscar Plano	Valladolid	Transfer	Free	
1 July 2017	Samu Delgado	Cultural Leonesa	Transfer	Free	
1 July 2017	Adrián Jiménez	Elche	Transfer	Free	
4 July 2017	Víctor Pastrana	Celta B	Transfer	Free	
5 July 2017	Adrián Diéguez	Alavés B	Transfer	Undisclosed	
11 July 2017	Luis Milla	Fuenlabrada	Transfer	Free	
18 July 2017	Fede Vega	Murcia	Transfer	Free	
20 July 2017	Răzvan Ochiroșii	Marbella	Transfer	Free	
22 July 2017	Lucien Owona	Almería	Transfer	€70K	
4 August 2017	Rafa Páez	UCAM Murcia	Transfer	Free	
4 August 2017	Fernando	Ponferradina	Transfer	Free	
7 August 2017	Nélson	AEK Larnaca	Transfer	Free	

=== Almería ===
Manager: Luis Miguel Ramis (2nd season)

==== In ====
Date	Player	From	Type	Fee	Ref
30 June 2017	Antonio Marín	Granada B	Loan return	Free	
30 June 2017	Carlos Selfa	Linense	Loan return	Free	
30 June 2017	Iago Díaz	Cultural Leonesa	Loan return	Free	
30 June 2017	Hicham Khaloua	Celta B	Loan return	Free	
1 July 2017	Gaspar Panadero	Almería B	Promoted		
1 July 2017	Alex Quintanilla	Mirandés	Transfer	Free	
5 July 2017	Fernando	UCAM Murcia	Transfer	Free	
5 July 2017	René	Girona	Transfer	Free	
8 July 2017	Mandi	Elche	Transfer	Free	
11 July 2017	Rubén Alcaraz	Girona	Loan	Free	
12 July 2017	Fran Rodríguez	Zaragoza	Transfer	Free	
17 July 2017	Pablo Caballero	Lugo	Transfer	Free	
17 July 2017	Pervis Estupiñán	Watford	Loan	Free	
22 July 2017	Lucien Owona	Alcorcón	Transfer	€70K	
1 August 2017	Tino Costa	San Lorenzo	Transfer	Free	
8 August 2017	Juan Muñoz	Sevilla	Loan	Free	
13 August 2017	Nauzet Alemán	TBD		Free	
31 August 2017	Verza	Levante	Loan	Free	

==== Out ====
Date	Player	To	Type	Fee	Ref
16 June 2017	Antonio Puertas	Granada	Transfer	Free	
19 June 2017	Ximo Navarro	Las Palmas	Transfer	Free	
23 June 2017	Casto	Alcorcón	Transfer	Free	
30 June 2017	Karim Yoda	Getafe	Loan return	Free	
1 July 2017	Chuli	Getafe	Transfer	€700K	
1 July 2017	Fran Vélez	Wisła Kraków	Transfer	Free	
1 July 2017	Julián	Wisła Kraków	Transfer	Free	
1 July 2017	Iván Sánchez	Albacete	Transfer	Free	
1 July 2017	Henrique Sereno	TBD		Free	
1 July 2017	Kalu Uche	TBD		Free	
1 July 2017	Jonathan Zongo	TBD		Free	
1 July 2017	Isidoro	TBD		Free	
1 July 2017	Corona	Retired			
12 July 2017	Borja Fernández	Valladolid	Transfer	Free	
13 July 2017	Ramon Azeez	Lugo	Transfer	Free	
14 July 2017	Quique	Osasuna	Transfer	€1.5M	
2 August 2017	Juanjo	Racing Santander	Transfer	Free	
10 August 2017	Pape Diamanka	Numancia	Transfer	Free	
11 August 2017	Carlos Selfa	Peña Deportiva	Transfer	Free	
17 August 2017	Iago Díaz	Ponferradina	Transfer	Free	
1 September 2017	Alex Quintanilla	TBD		Free	
1 September 2017	Antonio Marín	TBD		Free	

=== Barcelona B ===
Manager: Gerard López (3rd season)

==== In ====
Date	Player	From	Type	Fee	Ref
30 June 2017	Adrián Ortolá	Alavés	Loan return	Free	
30 June 2017	Jokin Ezkieta	Sabadell	Loan return	Free	
30 June 2017	Enric Franquesa	Gavà	Loan return	Free	
30 June 2017	Juan Cámara	Girona	Loan return	Free	
30 June 2017	Lucas Gafarot	Cornellà	Loan return	Free	
30 June 2017	Xavi Quintillà	Lleida	Loan return	Free	
1 July 2017	Oriol Busquets	Barcelona Juv.	Promoted		
1 July 2017	Seung-Woo Lee	Barcelona Juv.	Promoted		
1 July 2017	Dani Morer	Barcelona Juv.	Promoted		
1 July 2017	Marc Cucurella	Barcelona Juv.	Promoted		
1 July 2017	Braima Fati	Barcelona Juv.	Promoted		
1 July 2017	Alasana Manneh	Barcelona Juv.	Promoted		
1 July 2017	Abel Ruiz	Barcelona Juv.	Promoted		
1 July 2017	Santiago Bueno	Barcelona Juv.	Promoted		
1 July 2017	Sergi Puig	Barcelona Juv.	Promoted		
1 July 2017	Jérémy Guillemenot	Barcelona Juv.	Promoted		
1 July 2017	Carles Pérez	Barcelona Juv.	Promoted		
10 July 2017	Samu Araújo	Celta Vigo	Loan	Free	
10 July 2017	Vitinho	Palmeiras	Loan	Free	
17 July 2017	Ruiz de Galarreta	Numancia	Transfer	€700K	
17 July 2017	Moha	Badalona	Transfer	€10K	
18 July 2017	Jorge Cuenca	Alcorcón B	Transfer	€400K	
21 July 2017	Anthony Lozano	Olimpia	Transfer	€1.5M	
25 July 2017	José Luis Trápaga	Villarreal Juv.	Transfer	Free	
11 August 2017	David Concha	Real Sociedad	Loan	Free	
25 August 2017	José Arnáiz	Valladolid	Transfer	€3.4M	
31 August 2017	David Costas	Celta	Loan	Free	

==== Out ====
Date	Player	To	Type	Fee	Ref
30 June 2017	Ezekiel Bassey	Enyimba	Loan return	Free	
1 July 2017	Lucas Gafarot	TBD		Free	
3 July 2017	Enric Franquesa	Villarreal B	Transfer	Free	
6 July 2017	Borja López	Hajduk Split	Transfer	Free	
8 July 2017	José Aurelio Suárez	Girona B	Transfer	Free	
12 July 2017	Gerard Gumbau	Leganés	Transfer	Free	
17 July 2017	Alberto Perea	Cádiz	Transfer	Free	
17 July 2017	Dani Romera	Cádiz	Transfer	€350K	
18 July 2017	Xemi Fernández	Oxford United	Transfer	Free	
27 July 2017	Àlex Carbonell	Reus	Transfer	Free	
2 August 2017	Sergi Puig	Hospitalet	Loan	Free	
10 August 2017	Juan Cámara	Reus	Loan	Free	
11 August 2017	Moha	Hércules	Loan	Free	
11 August 2017	Adrià Vilanova	Hércules	Transfer	Free	
21 August 2017	Seung-Ho Paik	Girona B	Transfer	Free	
21 August 2017	Alasana Manneh	Sabadell	Loan	Free	
21 August 2017	José Luis Trápaga	Sabadell	Loan	Free	
29 August 2017	Braima Fati	Sabadell	Loan	Free	
30 August 2017	Nacho Abeledo	Málaga B	Transfer	Undisclosed	
31 August 2017	Seung-Woo Lee	Hellas Verona	Transfer	€1.5M	
1 September 2017	Nili Perdomo	Albacete	Transfer	Free	
1 September 2017	Jérémy Guillemenot	Sabadell	Loan	Free	
1 September 2017	Xavi Quintillà	TBD		Free	

=== Cádiz ===
Manager: Álvaro Cervera (3rd season)

==== In ====
Date	Player	From	Type	Fee	Ref
30 June 2017	Carlos Calvo	Badalona	Loan return	Free	
30 June 2017	Alberto Quintana	Rayo Majadahonda	Loan return	Free	
1 July 2017	Brian Oliván	Granada B	Transfer	€500K	
1 July 2017	Nico Hidalgo	Juventus	Transfer	Free	
1 July 2017	Moha	Córdoba	Transfer	Free	
12 July 2017	Marcos Mauro	Villarreal B	Transfer	Free	
12 July 2017	David Barral	APOEL	Transfer	Free	
17 July 2017	Dani Romera	Barcelona B	Transfer	€350K	
17 July 2017	Alberto Perea	Barcelona B	Transfer	Free	
7 August 2017	Rober Correa	Espanyol	Transfer	Free	
7 August 2017	Lucas Bijker	Heerenveen	Transfer	Free	
7 August 2017	Álex Fernández	Elche	Transfer	Free	
9 August 2017	Ivan Kecojević	FC Zürich	Transfer	Free	
10 August 2017	Mikel Villanueva	Málaga	Loan	Free	
18 August 2017	Rubén Yáñez	Getafe	Loan	Free	
1 September 2017	José Ángel Carrillo	Sevilla B	Transfer	Free	

==== Out ====
Date	Player	To	Type	Fee	Ref
28 June 2017	Luis Ruiz	Lugo	Transfer	Free	
30 June 2017	Ager Aketxe	Athletic Bilbao	Loan return	Free	
30 June 2017	Gorka Santamaría	Athletic Bilbao	Loan return	Free	
30 June 2017	Alfredo Ortuño	Las Palmas	Loan return	Free	
30 June 2017	Gastón del Castillo	Independiente	Loan return	Free	
10 July 2017	Migue	Sabadell	Transfer	Free	
10 July 2017	Dani Güiza	Sanluqueño	Transfer	Free	
17 July 2017	Aridane	Osasuna	Transfer	€1.5M	
21 July 2017	Jesús Fernández	Cultural Leonesa	Transfer	Free	
31 July 2017	Carlos Calvo	Recreativo	Transfer	Free	
17 August 2017	Alberto Quintana	Levante B	Transfer	Free	
29 August 2017	Eddy Silvestre	Gimnàstic	Transfer	Free	
31 August 2017	Jesús Imaz	Wisła Kraków	Transfer	Free	
1 September 2017	Iván Malón	Recreativo	Transfer	Free	

=== Córdoba ===
Manager: Luis Carrión (2nd season)

==== In ====
Date	Player	From	Type	Fee	Ref
30 June 2017	Borja Domínguez	Oviedo	Loan return	Free	
30 June 2017	Abel Moreno	Ponferradina	Loan return	Free	
1 July 2017	Esteve	Córdoba B	Promoted		
1 July 2017	Javi Galán	Córdoba B	Promoted		
1 July 2017	Marc Vito	Córdoba B	Promoted		
1 July 2017	Alberto Quiles	Córdoba B	Promoted		
1 July 2017	Álex Vallejo	Mallorca	Transfer	Free	
1 July 2017	Sergi Guardiola	Granada B	Transfer	Free	
1 July 2017	Miguel Loureiro	Pontevedra	Transfer	Free	
1 July 2017	Dani Pinillos	Nottingham Forest	Transfer	Free	
2 July 2017	José Fernández	Oviedo	Transfer	Free	
2 July 2017	Josema	Almería B	Transfer	Free	
2 July 2017	Jona	Albacete	Transfer	€400K	
8 July 2017	Jaime Romero	Osasuna	Transfer	€500K	
9 July 2017	João Afonso	Vitória Guimarães	Loan	Free	
26 July 2017	Igor Stefanović	Moreirense	Transfer	Free	
20 August 2017	Saša Jovanović	Mladost Lučani	Transfer	Undisclosed	
1 September 2017	Javi Noblejas	Rayo Vallecano	Loan	Free	

==== Out ====
Date	Player	To	Type	Fee	Ref
30 June 2017	Guille Donoso	Lugo	Transfer	Free	
1 July 2017	Domingo Cisma	TBD		Free	
1 July 2017	Samu de los Reyes	TBD		Free	
1 July 2017	Federico Piovaccari	Zhejiang Yiteng	Transfer	Free	
6 July 2017	Borja Domínguez	Alcorcón	Transfer	€100K	
8 July 2017	Antoñito	Valladolid	Transfer	Free	
11 July 2017	Héctor Rodas	Cercle Brugge	Transfer	Free	
12 July 2017	Deivid	Valladolid	Transfer	Free	
14 July 2017	Luso	Huesca	Transfer	Free	
18 July 2017	Abel Moreno	Zaragoza B	Transfer	Free	
19 July 2017	Zakarya Bergdich	Sochaux	Transfer	Free	
25 July 2017	Marc Vito	Extremadura	Loan	Free	
28 July 2017	Rodri	Cultural Leonesa	Transfer	Free	
31 July 2017	Brimah Razak	Mamelodi Sundowns	Transfer	Free	
31 July 2017	Juli	Hércules	Transfer	Free	
1 August 2017	Alberto Quiles	UCAM Murcia	Loan	Free	
7 August 2017	Mariano Bíttolo	Albacete	Transfer	Free	
7 August 2017	Jonathan Bijimine	Apollon Smyrnis	Transfer	Free	
26 August 2017	Pedro Ríos	San Fernando	Transfer	Free	

=== Cultural Leonesa ===
Manager: Rubén de la Barrera (2nd season)

==== In ====
Date	Player	From	Type	Fee	Ref
30 June 2017	César Morgado	Villanovense	Loan return	Free	
1 July 2017	Samu Delgado	Alcorcón	Transfer	Free	
4 July 2017	Manu	Lugo	Transfer	Free	
5 July 2017	Ariday	Valencia B	Transfer	Free	
9 July 2017	Pito Camacho	Izarra	Transfer	Free	
9 July 2017	Isaac Carcelén	Zaragoza	Transfer	Undisclosed	
11 July 2017	Unai Albizua	UCAM Murcia	Transfer	Free	
11 July 2017	Alonso	Recreativo	Transfer	Free	
12 July 2017	Iván Agudo	Badalona	Transfer	Free	
14 July 2017	Ahmed Yasser	Lekhwiya	Loan	Free	
14 July 2017	Yelko Pino	Lugo	Loan	Free	
17 July 2017	Santiago Magallán	Unión Santa Fe	Transfer	Free	
18 July 2017	Iker Guarrotxena	Mirandés	Transfer	Free	
20 July 2017	Josep Señé	Celta	Transfer	Undisclosed	
21 July 2017	Jesús Fernández	Cádiz	Transfer	Free	
27 July 2017	Emi Buendía	Getafe	Loan	Free	
28 July 2017	Rodri	Córdoba	Transfer	Free	
2 August 2017	Ouasim Bouy	Leeds United	Loan	Free	
29 August 2017	Ahmed Moein	El Jaish	Transfer	Free	

==== Out ====
Date	Player	To	Type	Fee	Ref
30 June 2017	Iago Díaz	Almería	Loan return	Free	
30 June 2017	José León	Real Madrid B	Loan return	Free	
30 June 2017	Jorge Ortí	Zaragoza	Loan return	Free	
1 July 2017	Toni Villa	Valladolid	Transfer	€50K	
3 July 2017	David Forniés	Murcia	Transfer	Free	
4 July 2017	Leandro	Villanovense	Transfer	Free	
6 July 2017	Jorge Cano	Honka	Transfer	Free	
7 July 2017	Benja	Elche	Transfer	Free	
10 July 2017	Álex Gallar	Huesca	Transfer	€400K	
17 July 2017	César Morgado	Valencia B	Transfer	Free	
1 August 2017	Francisco Regalón	Racing Santander	Transfer	Free	
2 August 2017	Guillermo Vallejo	Elche	Loan	Free	
7 August 2017	Alonso	Marbella	Loan	Free	
10 August 2017	Pito Camacho	Mirandés	Transfer	Free	
17 August 2017	Iván Agudo	Lleida Esportiu	Loan	Free	

=== Gimnàstic ===
Manager: Lluís Carreras (1st season)

==== In ====
Date	Player	From	Type	Fee	Ref
29 June 2017	Maikel Mesa	Mirandés	Transfer	Free	
30 June 2017	Moussa Bandeh	Badalona	Loan return	Free	
30 June 2017	Otar Kakabadze	Esbjerg	Loan return	Free	
30 June 2017	Carlos García	Sanluqueño	Loan return	Free	
6 July 2017	Abraham Minero	Zaragoza	Transfer	Free	
9 July 2017	Tete Morente	Atlético Baleares	Transfer	Free	
11 July 2017	Carlos Blanco	Juventus	Transfer	Free	
12 July 2017	Sandro Toscano	Badalona	Transfer	Free	
13 July 2017	Omar Perdomo	Tenerife	Loan	Free	
20 July 2017	Bernabé	Atlético Madrid B	Transfer	Free	
28 July 2017	Javi Jiménez	Málaga B	Transfer	Free	
28 July 2017	Álvaro Bustos	Sporting Gijón	Transfer	Free	
1 August 2017	Juanmi Carrión	Sevilla C	Transfer	Free	
22 August 2017	Jon Gaztañaga	Real Sociedad	Transfer	Free	
23 August 2017	Jean Marie Dongou	Zaragoza	Transfer	Free	
29 August 2017	Eddy Silvestre	Cádiz	Transfer	Free	

==== Out ====
Date	Player	To	Type	Fee	Ref
30 June 2017	Lévy Madinda	Celta	Loan return	Free	
30 June 2017	Luismi	Valladolid	Loan return	Free	
1 July 2017	Manolo Martínez	Retired			
1 July 2017	Iago Bouzón	TBD		Free	
1 July 2017	José Carlos	TBD		Free	
1 July 2017	Cristian Lobato	Sporting Kansas City	Transfer	Undisclosed	
1 July 2017	Moussa Bandeh	Lleida Esportiu	Transfer	Free	
6 July 2017	Manolo Reina	Mallorca	Transfer	Free	
10 July 2017	Álex López	Mallorca	Transfer	Undisclosed	
12 July 2017	Gerard Valentín	Deportivo La Coruña	Transfer	€1M	
31 July 2017	Mossa	Oviedo	Transfer	Undisclosed	
1 August 2017	Cordero	Cartagena	Transfer	Free	
12 August 2017	Juanmi Carrión	Linense	Loan	Free	
31 August 2017	Ferrán Giner	Mallorca	Transfer	Free	
1 September 2017	Achille Emaná	Mumbai City	Transfer	Free	
1 September 2017	Carlos García	Logroñés	Loan	Free	

=== Granada ===
Manager: José Luis Oltra (1st season)

==== In ====
Date	Player	From	Type	Fee	Ref
13 June 2017	Javi Varas	Las Palmas	Transfer	Free	
14 June 2017	Joselu	Lugo	Transfer	Free	
16 June 2017	Antonio Puertas	Almería	Transfer	Free	
27 June 2017	Álex Martínez	Real Betis	Transfer	Free	
29 June 2017	Quini	Rayo Vallecano	Transfer	Free	
30 June 2017	Darwin Machís	Leganés	Loan return	Free	
30 June 2017	Molla Wagué	Leicester City	Loan return	Free	
30 June 2017	Christian Bravo	Universidad Católica	Loan return	Free	
1 July 2017	Urtzi Iriondo	Athletic Bilbao	Loan	Free	
3 July 2017	Raúl Baena	Rayo Vallecano	Transfer	Free	
4 July 2017	Germán	Tenerife	Transfer	€100K	
4 July 2017	Víctor Díaz	Leganés	Transfer	Free	
5 July 2017	Hernán Menosse	Once Caldas	Transfer	€30K	
6 July 2017	Pedro	Elche	Transfer	Free	
7 July 2017	Charlie Dean	Valencia B	Transfer	Free	
7 July 2017	Alberto Martín	Leganés	Transfer	Free	
15 July 2017	Ángel Montoro	Las Palmas	Transfer	Free	
25 July 2017	Pierre Kunde	Atlético Madrid B	Loan	Free	
7 August 2017	Javi Espinosa	Levante	Loan	Free	
30 August 2017	Rey Manaj	Internazionale	Loan	Free	
31 August 2017	Licá	Nottingham Forest	Transfer	Free	
1 September 2017	Sergio Peña	Granada B	Promoted		

==== Out ====
Date	Player	To	Type	Fee	Ref
30 June 2017	Victorien Angban	Chelsea	Loan return	Free	
30 June 2017	Jérémie Boga	Chelsea	Loan return	Free	
30 June 2017	Artem Kravets	Dynamo Kyiv	Loan return	Free	
30 June 2017	Aly Mallé	Watford	Loan return	Free	
30 June 2017	Guillermo Ochoa	Málaga	Loan return	Free	
30 June 2017	Andreas Pereira	Manchester United	Loan return	Free	
30 June 2017	Ezequiel Ponce	Roma	Loan return	Free	
30 June 2017	Sergi Samper	Barcelona	Loan return	Free	
30 June 2017	Gabriel Silva	Udinese	Loan return	Free	
30 June 2017	Gastón Silva	Torino	Loan return	Free	
30 June 2017	Franck Tabanou	Swansea City	Loan return	Free	
30 June 2017	Rúben Vezo	Valencia	Loan return	Free	
30 June 2017	Uche Agbo	Watford	Loan return	Free	
30 June 2017	Héctor Hernández	Real Sociedad	Loan return	Free	
30 June 2017	Panagiotis Kone	Udinese	Loan return	Free	
30 June 2017	Mubarak Wakaso	Panathinaikos	Loan return	Free	
1 July 2017	David Lombán	TBD		Free	
1 July 2017	Sverrir Ingi Ingason	Rostov	Transfer	€2M	
1 July 2017	Omer Atzili	Maccabi Tel Aviv	Transfer	€1M	
1 July 2017	Isaac Cuenca	Hapoel Be'er Sheva	Transfer	Free	
1 July 2017	Molla Wagué	Udinese	Loan	Free	
1 July 2017	Christian Bravo	Unión Española	Loan	Free	
7 July 2017	Juanan Entrena	Alavés	Transfer	Free	
7 July 2017	Mehdi Carcela	Olympiacos	Transfer	€2.5M	
25 August 2017	Dimitri Foulquier	Watford	Transfer	Free	
26 August 2017	Rene Krhin	Nantes	Loan	Free	

=== Huesca ===
Manager: Rubi (1st season)

==== In ====
Date	Player	From	Type	Fee	Ref
30 June 2017	Aly Coulibaly	Badalona	Loan return	Free	
30 June 2017	Boris Cmiljanić	Levante B	Loan return	Free	
30 June 2017	Álex García	Atlético Madrid B	Loan return	Free	
7 July 2017	Rulo	Linense	Transfer	Free	
7 July 2017	Jorge Pulido	Sint-Truiden	Transfer	Undisclosed	
8 July 2017	Juan Camilo Hernández	Watford	Loan	Free	
8 July 2017	Antonio Valera	Córdoba	Transfer	Free	
10 July 2017	Álex Gallar	Cultural Leonesa	Transfer	€400K	
14 July 2017	Luso	Córdoba	Transfer	Free	
21 July 2017	Álex Remiro	Athletic Bilbao	Loan	Free	
24 July 2017	Ander Bardají	Real Sociedad	Transfer	Free	
31 July 2017	Ezequiel Rescaldani	Atlético Nacional	Loan	Free	
1 August 2017	Ezequiel Ávila	San Lorenzo	Loan	Free	

==== Out ====
Date	Player	To	Type	Fee	Ref
30 June 2017	Vinícius Araújo	Valencia	Loan return	Free	
1 July 2017	Queco Piña	TBD		Free	
6 July 2017	Borja Lázaro	Alcorcón	Transfer	Undisclosed	
8 July 2017	César Soriano	Alcorcón	Transfer	Free	
10 July 2017	Samuel Sáiz	Leeds United	Transfer	€3.5M	
12 July 2017	Sergio Herrera	Osasuna	Transfer	€300K	
12 July 2017	Franck-Yves Bambock	Sparta Rotterdam	Transfer	Undisclosed	
26 July 2017	Aly Coulibaly	Badalona	Transfer	Free	
26 July 2017	Javi Jiménez	TBD		Free	
9 August 2017	David López	UCAM Murcia	Transfer	Free	

=== Lorca FC ===
Manager: Curro Torres (1st season)

==== In ====
Date	Player	From	Type	Fee	Ref
30 June 2017	Samu Martínez	Hospitalet	Loan return	Free	
30 June 2017	Haritz Albisua	Lleida Esportiu	Loan return	Free	
30 June 2017	Mikel Fernández	Lleida Esportiu	Loan return	Free	
6 July 2017	Jaume Valens	Mallorca B	Transfer	Free	
11 July 2017	Tropi	Valencia	Loan	Free	
14 July 2017	Markus Holgersson	AaB	Transfer	Free	
18 July 2017	Adán Gurdiel	Ponferradina	Transfer	Free	
19 July 2017	Carlos Peña	Getafe	Transfer	Free	
19 July 2017	Javi Muñoz	Real Madrid B	Loan	Free	
21 July 2017	Fran Cruz	Mirandés	Transfer	Free	
22 July 2017	Franco Torgnascioli	Mineros de Zacatecas	Transfer	Free	
3 August 2017	Miguel Merentiel	Peñarol	Loan	Free	
5 August 2017	Santi Luque	Tenerife	Transfer	Free	
8 August 2017	Eugeni Valderrama	Valencia B	Loan	Free	
8 August 2017	Sito	Valencia B	Loan	Free	
8 August 2017	José Carlos	Betis	Loan	Free	
28 August 2017	Nando	Alavés	Loan	Free	

==== Out ====
Date	Player	To	Type	Fee	Ref
30 June 2017	Matheus Aias	Granada B	Loan return	Free	
30 June 2017	Jaime Moreno	Málaga B	Loan return	Free	
1 July 2017	Sergio Menéndez	TBD		Free	
1 July 2017	José Lafrentz	TBD		Free	
1 July 2017	Samu Martínez	TBD		Free	
11 July 2017	Borja Martínez	Ebro	Transfer	Free	
21 July 2017	José Rojas	San Luis de Quillota	Transfer	Undisclosed	
1 August 2017	Gonzalo Poley	Cartagena	Transfer	Free	
7 August 2017	Borja García	Extremadura	Transfer	Free	
8 August 2017	Urko Arroyo	UCAM Murcia	Transfer	Free	
15 August 2017	Santi Luque	Recreativo	Loan	Free	
29 August 2017	Mikel Fernández	Racing Ferrol	Transfer	Free	

=== Lugo ===
Manager: Francisco (1st season)

==== In ====
Date	Player	From	Type	Fee	Ref
13 June 2017	Vasyl Kravets	Karpaty Lviv	Transfer	Undisclosed	
30 June 2017	Keko Vilariño	Somozas	Loan return	Free	
30 June 2017	Dani Pedrosa	Somozas	Loan return	Free	
30 June 2017	Mario Barco	Pontevedra	Loan return	Free	
30 June 2017	Manu Cedrón	Castro	Loan return	Free	
30 June 2017	Lionel Enguene	Leixões	Loan return	Free	
1 July 2017	Juan Carlos	Elche	Transfer	Free	
1 July 2017	Luis Ruiz	Cádiz	Transfer	Free	
1 July 2017	Josete	Elche	Transfer	Free	
1 July 2017	Guille Donoso	Córdoba	Transfer	Free	
1 July 2017	Bernardo	Sevilla B	Transfer	Free	
1 July 2017	Marcelo Djaló	Juventus	Transfer	Free	
6 July 2017	Edu Campabadal	Mallorca	Transfer	Free	
13 July 2017	Ramon Azeez	Almería	Transfer	Free	
14 July 2017	Cristian Herrera	Girona	Transfer	Free	
9 August 2017	Kike Pérez	Rayo Vallecano B	Transfer	Free	
10 August 2017	Sergio Díaz	Real Madrid B	Loan	Free	
19 August 2017	Francisco Fydriszewski	Newell's Old Boys	Loan	Free	
29 August 2017	Luis Muñoz	Málaga	Loan	Free	
1 September 2017	Nicolás Albarracín	Peñarol	Loan	Free	

==== Out ====
Date	Player	To	Type	Fee	Ref
30 June 2017	Brayan Perea	Lazio	Loan return	Free	
30 June 2017	Damià	Mallorca	Loan return	Free	
30 June 2017	Jordi Calavera	Eibar	Loan return	Free	
1 July 2017	Joselu	Granada	Transfer	Free	
1 July 2017	Carlos Hernández	Oviedo	Transfer	Free	
1 July 2017	José Juan	Elche	Transfer	Free	
3 July 2017	Marcelo Djaló	Fulham	Transfer	€800K	
4 July 2017	Manu	Cultural Leonesa	Transfer	Free	
10 July 2017	Igor Martínez	Mirandés	Transfer	Free	
14 July 2017	Yelko Pino	Cultural Leonesa	Transfer	Free	
17 July 2017	Pablo Caballero	Almería	Transfer	Free	
2 August 2017	Dani Pedrosa	Cerceda	Loan	Free	
7 August 2017	Keko Vilariño	Cerceda	Loan	Free	
10 August 2017	Kike Pérez	Cerceda	Loan	Free	
17 August 2017	Ángel Dealbert	Castellón	Transfer	Free	
26 August 2017	Maxi Rolón	Arsenal de Sarandí	Transfer	Free	
1 September 2017	Lionel Enguene	TBD		Free	

=== Numancia ===
Manager: Jagoba Arrasate (3rd season)

==== In ====
Date	Player	From	Type	Fee	Ref
20 June 2017	Higinio Marín	Valladolid B	Transfer	Free	
27 June 2017	Guillermo Fernández	Elche	Transfer	Free	
29 June 2017	Gregorio Sierra	Valencia Mestalla	Transfer	Free	
5 July 2017	Pablo Larrea	Villarreal B	Transfer	Free	
6 July 2017	Pere Milla	Eibar	Loan	Free	
7 July 2017	Markel Etxeberria	Numancia	Loan	Free	
10 August 2017	Pape Diamanka	Almería	Transfer	Free	
16 August 2017	Unai Elgezabal	Eibar	Loan	Free	

==== Out ====
Date	Player	To	Type	Fee	Ref
30 June 2017	Kike Sola	Athletic Bilbao	Loan return	Free	
30 June 2017	Asier Villalibre	Athletic Bilbao	Loan return	Free	
30 June 2017	Eneko Capilla	Real Sociedad	Loan return	Free	
30 June 2017	Jairo Morillas	Espanyol	Loan return	Free	
9 July 2017	Pedro Orfila	Murcia	Transfer	Free	
17 July 2017	Ruiz de Galarreta	Barcelona B	Transfer	€700K	
18 July 2017	Casado	Recreativo	Transfer	Free	
24 July 2017	Mikel Saizar	Burgos	Transfer	Free	
28 July 2017	Marc Pedraza	Mallorca	Transfer	Free	

=== Osasuna ===
Manager: Diego Martínez (1st season)

==== In ====
Date	Player	From	Type	Fee	Ref
18 May 2017	Kike Barja	Osasuna B	Promoted		
13 June 2017	Miguel Díaz	Osasuna B	Promoted		
29 June 2017	David Rodríguez	Alcorcón	Transfer	€350K	
1 July 2017	Sebas Coris	Girona	Loan	Free	
6 July 2017	Lucas Torró	Real Madrid B	Transfer	Free	
12 July 2017	Sergio Herrera	Huesca	Transfer	€300K	
13 July 2017	Mateo García	Las Palmas	Loan	Free	
14 July 2017	Quique	Almería	Transfer	€1.5M	
17 July 2017	Aridane	Cádiz	Transfer	€1.5M	
21 July 2017	Xisco	Muangthong United	Transfer	Free	
26 July 2017	Joaquín Arzura	River Plate	Loan	Free	
3 August 2017	Manu Herrera	Betis	Transfer	Free	
1 September 2017	Lillo	Sporting Gijón	Transfer	Free	

==== Out ====
Date	Player	To	Type	Fee	Ref
30 June 2017	Sergio León	Betis	Transfer	€3.5M	
30 June 2017	Oriol Riera	Deportivo La Coruña	Loan return	Free	
30 June 2017	Didier Digard	Betis	Loan return	Free	
30 June 2017	Emmanuel Rivière	Newcastle United	Loan return	Free	
30 June 2017	Salvatore Sirigu	Paris Saint-Germain	Loan return	Free	
1 July 2017	Fuentes	TBD		Free	
1 July 2017	Kenan Kodro	Mainz 05	Transfer	€1.75M	
7 July 2017	Nikola Vujadinović	Lech Poznań	Transfer	Free	
8 July 2017	Jaime Romero	Córdoba	Transfer	€500K	
11 July 2017	Goran Čaušić	Arsenal Tula	Transfer	Free	
17 July 2017	Álex Berenguer	Torino	Transfer	€5.5M	
28 July 2017	Nauzet Pérez	TBD		Free	
18 August 2017	Mario Fernández	Rayo Vallecano	Transfer	Free	
29 August 2017	Miguel Olavide	Sevilla B	Loan	Free	
31 August 2017	Raoul Loé	CSKA Sofia	Transfer	Free	

=== Oviedo ===
Manager: Juan Antonio Anquela (1st season)

==== In ====
Date	Player	From	Type	Fee	Ref
30 June 2017	Ramón Folch	Reus	Transfer	Free	
1 July 2017	Alfonso Herrero	Oviedo B	Promoted		
1 July 2017	Aarón Ñíguez	Tenerife	Transfer	Free	
1 July 2017	Carlos Hernández	Lugo	Transfer	Free	
15 July 2017	Nahuel Valentini	Spezia	Transfer	Free	
18 July 2017	Matej Pučko	Koper	Transfer	Free	
27 July 2017	Diego Fabbrini	Birmingham City	Loan	Free	
31 July 2017	McDonald Mariga	Latina	Transfer	Free	
31 July 2017	Mossa	Gimnàstic	Transfer	Undisclosed	
1 August 2017	Guillermo Cotugno	Rubin Kazan	Transfer	Free	
1 August 2017	Patrik Hidi	Honvéd	Transfer	Free	
29 August 2017	Juan Forlín	Querétaro	Transfer	Free	
31 August 2017	Yaw Yeboah	Manchester City	Loan	Free	
1 September 2017	Owusu Kwabena	Leganés	Loan	Free	

==== Out ====
Date	Player	To	Type	Fee	Ref
30 June 2017	Óscar Gil	Athletic Bilbao	Loan return	Free	
30 June 2017	David Costas	Celta	Loan return	Free	
30 June 2017	Borja Domínguez	Córdoba	Loan return	Free	
30 June 2017	Nando	Valencia	Loan return	Free	
30 June 2017	Carlos de Pena	Middlesbrough	Loan return	Free	
30 June 2017	Lucas Torró	Real Madrid B	Loan return	Free	
1 July 2017	Michu	Retired			
1 July 2017	Esteban	Retired			
2 July 2017	José Fernández	Córdoba	Transfer	Free	
8 July 2017	Jonathan Pereira	Alcorcón	Transfer	Free	
14 July 2017	David Fernández	Alcorcón	Transfer	Free	
16 July 2017	Jonathan Vila	Recreativo	Transfer	Free	
2 August 2017	Néstor Susaeta	Albacete	Transfer	Free	
3 August 2017	Jon Erice	Albacete	Transfer	Free	
24 August 2017	Héctor Nespral	Langreo	Transfer	Free	
1 September 2017	Jorge Ortiz	TBD		Free	

=== Rayo Vallecano ===
Manager: Míchel (2nd season)

==== In ====
Date	Player	From	Type	Fee	Ref
21 June 2017	Óscar Trejo	Toulouse	Transfer	Free	
30 June 2017	Johan Mojica	Girona	Loan return	Free	
1 July 2017	Sergio Akieme	Rayo Vallecano B	Promoted		
13 July 2017	Alberto García	Getafe	Loan	Free	
18 July 2017	Francisco Cerro	Racing Club	Transfer	Free	
1 August 2017	Unai López	Athletic Bilbao	Loan	Free	
7 August 2017	Chori Domínguez	Olympiacos	Transfer	Free	
18 August 2017	Mario Fernández	Osasuna	Transfer	Free	
23 August 2017	Nacho Monsalve	Deportivo B	Transfer	Free	
24 August 2017	Emiliano Velázquez	Getafe	Loan	Free	
30 August 2017	Abdoulaye Ba	Porto	Transfer	Free	
31 August 2017	Javi Noblejas	Albacete	Transfer	Free	
1 September 2017	Baiano	Braga	Transfer	Free	
1 September 2017	Raúl de Tomás	Real Madrid B	Loan	Free	

==== Out ====
Date	Player	To	Type	Fee	Ref
29 June 2017	Quini	Granada	Transfer	Free	
30 June 2017	Paulo Gazzaniga	Southampton	Loan return	Free	
30 June 2017	Pablo Íñiguez	Villarreal	Loan return	Free	
30 June 2017	Tomás Mejías	Middlesbrough	Loan return	Free	
30 June 2017	Franco Cristaldo	Boca Juniors	Loan return	Free	
1 July 2017	Patrick Ebert	TBD		Free	
1 July 2017	Manucho	TBD		Free	
3 July 2017	Zé Castro	TBD		Free	
3 July 2017	Raúl Baena	Granada	Transfer	Free	
6 July 2017	Nacho	Valladolid	Transfer	Free	
6 July 2017	Jordi Gómez	Levski Sofia	Transfer	Free	
17 July 2017	Toni Dovale	Bengaluru	Transfer	Free	
18 August 2017	Johan Mojica	Girona	Loan	Free	
24 August 2017	Nacho Monsalve	Recreativo	Loan	Free	
30 August 2017	Miku	Bengaluru	Transfer	Free	
1 September 2017	Javi Noblejas	Córdoba	Loan	Free	

=== Reus ===
Manager: Aritz López Garai (1st season)

==== In ====
Date	Player	From	Type	Fee	Ref
7 July 2017	Roberto Santamaría	Mallorca	Transfer	Free	
10 July 2017	Gus Ledes	Celta B	Transfer	Free	
12 July 2017	Pablo Íñiguez	Villarreal	Transfer	Free	
13 July 2017	Álex Menéndez	TBD		Free	
15 July 2017	Tito	UCAM Murcia	Transfer	Free	
20 July 2017	Borja Fernández	Celta B	Loan	Free	
27 July 2017	Àlex Carbonell	Barcelona B	Transfer	Free	
10 August 2017	Juan Cámara	Barcelona B	Loan	Free	
23 August 2017	Juan Domínguez	Deportivo La Coruña	Transfer	Free	
1 September 2017	Dejan Lekić	Mallorca	Transfer	Free	

==== Out ====
Date	Player	To	Type	Fee	Ref
13 June 2017	Alberto Benito	Zaragoza	Transfer	Free	
13 June 2017	Ángel Martínez	Zaragoza	Transfer	Free	
30 June 2017	Ramón Folch	Oviedo	Transfer	Free	
30 June 2017	Srđan Babić	Real Sociedad	Loan return	Free	
30 June 2017	Jorge Díaz	Zaragoza	Loan return	Free	
1 July 2017	Aritz López Garai	Retired			
1 July 2017	Macky Chrisantus	TBD		Free	
1 July 2017	Álex Albistegi	Mirandés	Transfer	Free	
7 July 2017	Jordi Codina	Fuenlabrada	Transfer	Free	
4 August 2017	Marcos Tébar	Pune City	Transfer	Free	
14 August 2017	Melli	Mirandés	Transfer	Free	

=== Sevilla Atlético ===
Manager: Luis Tevenet (1st season)

==== In ====
Date	Player	From	Type	Fee	Ref
30 June 2017	Andrija Vukčević	San Fernando	Loan return	Free	
30 June 2017	Antonio Romero	Mérida	Loan return	Free	
1 July 2017	José Amo	Sevilla Juv.	Promoted		
1 July 2017	José Mena	Sevilla Juv.	Promoted		
1 July 2017	Maryan Shved	Sevilla Juv.	Promoted		
1 July 2017	Juan Berrocal	Sevilla Juv.	Promoted		
1 July 2017	Fabrice Ondoa	Gimnàstic	Transfer	€500K	
26 July 2017	Mariano Konyk	Valencia Juv.	Transfer	Free	
7 August 2017	Aitor Cantalapiedra	Villarreal B	Transfer	Undisclosed	
28 August 2017	Felipe Carballo	Nacional	Transfer	€1.2M	
29 August 2017	Miguel Olavide	Osasuna	Loan	Free	

==== Out ====
Date	Player	To	Type	Fee	Ref
30 June 2017	Andrés Schetino	Fiorentina	Loan return	Free	
1 July 2017	Borja Lasso	Sevilla	Promoted		
1 July 2017	Bernardo	Lugo	Transfer	Free	
12 July 2017	Jorge Carrascal	Karpaty Lviv	Loan	Free	
21 July 2017	Andrija Vukčević	Spartak Subotica	Transfer	Undisclosed	
24 July 2017	Antonio Romero	Mirandés	Transfer	Free	
3 August 2017	Diego González	Málaga	Transfer	€2M	
7 August 2017	Ivi	Levante	Transfer	€1.2M	
8 August 2017	Cotán	Valladolid	Transfer	Undisclosed	
30 August 2017	Maryan Shved	Karpaty Lviv	Transfer	Undisclosed	
1 September 2017	José Ángel Carrillo	Cádiz	Transfer	Free	

=== Sporting Gijón ===
Manager: Paco Herrera (1st season)

==== In ====
Date	Player	From	Type	Fee	Ref
30 June 2017	Pablo Pérez	Alcorcón	Loan return	Free	
30 June 2017	Rachid Aït-Atmane	Tenerife	Loan return	Free	
30 June 2017	Álvaro Bustos	Mirandés	Loan return	Free	
30 June 2017	Julio Rodríguez	Barnsley	Loan return	Free	
10 July 2017	Álex Bergantiños	Deportivo La Coruña	Loan	Free	
12 July 2017	Stefan Šćepović	Getafe	Loan	Free	
25 July 2017	Federico Barba	Empoli	Transfer	€1.75M	
28 July 2017	Rubén García	Levante	Loan	Free	
2 August 2017	Juan Quintero	Deportivo Cali	Loan	Free	
10 August 2017	Xandão	TBD		Free	
14 August 2017	Michael Santos	Málaga	Loan	Free	
17 August 2017	Álex Pérez	Valladolid	Transfer	Free	
18 August 2017	Álex López	Celta	Transfer	Free	
28 August 2017	Jordi Calavera	Eibar	Loan	Free	

==== Out ====
Date	Player	To	Type	Fee	Ref
22 June 2017	Nacho Cases	AEK Larnaca	Transfer	Free	
30 June 2017	Douglas	Barcelona	Loan return	Free	
30 June 2017	Mikel Vesga	Athletic Bilbao	Loan return	Free	
30 June 2017	Lacina Traoré	Monaco	Loan return	Free	
30 June 2017	Elderson Echiéjilé	Monaco	Loan return	Free	
30 June 2017	Burgui	Real Madrid	Loan return	Free	
30 June 2017	Duje Čop	Cagliari	Loan return	Free	
30 June 2017	Akram Afif	Villarreal	Loan return	Free	
5 July 2017	Iván Cuéllar	Leganés	Transfer	Free	
10 July 2017	Fernando Amorebieta	Independiente	Transfer	Free	
20 July 2017	Jorge Meré	1. FC Köln	Transfer	€9M	
26 July 2017	Julio Rodríguez	Recreativo	Transfer	Free	
27 July 2017	Álvaro Bustos	Gimnàstic	Transfer	Free	
2 August 2017	Víctor Rodríguez	Seattle Sounders FC	Transfer	Free	
25 August 2017	Xavi Torres	Perth Glory	Transfer	Free	
1 September 2017	Lillo	Osasuna	Transfer	Free	
1 September 2017	(Martinique) Jean-Sylvain Babin	Maccabi Tel Aviv	Loan	Free	
1 September 2017	Dani Ndi	TBD		Free	

=== Tenerife ===
Manager: José Luis Martí (3rd season)

==== In ====
Date	Player	From	Type	Fee	Ref
29 June 2017	Juan Villar	Valladolid	Transfer	Free	
30 June 2017	Carlos Abad	Real Madrid B	Loan return	Free	
30 June 2017	Álex García	Mirandés	Loan return	Free	
30 June 2017	Ale González	Mensajero	Loan return	Free	
30 June 2017	Santi Luque	Melilla	Loan return	Free	
5 July 2017	Víctor Casadesús	Levante	Transfer	Free	
10 July 2017	Juan Carlos	CFR Cluj	Transfer	Free	
12 July 2017	Bryan Acosta	Real España	Transfer	Free	
14 July 2017	Lucas Aveldaño	Belgrano	Transfer	Free	
15 July 2017	Tyronne	Las Palmas	Transfer	Free	
21 July 2017	Luis Pérez	Elche	Transfer	Free	
16 August 2017	Paco Montañés	Espanyol	Transfer	Free	
22 August 2017	Filip Malbašić	Vojvodina	Transfer	Undisclosed	
23 August 2017	Samuele Longo	Internazionale	Loan	Free	

==== Out ====
Date	Player	To	Type	Fee	Ref
30 June 2017	Rachid Aït-Atmane	Sporting Gijón	Loan return	Free	
30 June 2017	Haythem Jouini	Espérance Tunis	Loan return	Free	
30 June 2017	Amath	Atlético Madrid	Loan return	Free	
30 June 2017	Anthony Lozano	C.D. Olimpia	Loan return	Free	
30 June 2017	Tyronne	Las Palmas	Loan return	Free	
1 July 2017	Edu Oriol	TBD		Free	
3 July 2017	Aarón Ñíguez	Oviedo	Transfer	Free	
4 July 2017	Germán	Granada	Transfer	€100K	
5 July 2017	Ale González	Las Palmas B	Transfer	Free	
8 July 2017	Ismael Falcón	Hércules	Transfer	Free	
13 July 2017	Omar Perdomo	Gimnàstic	Loan	Free	
17 July 2017	Gaku Shibasaki	Getafe	Transfer	Free	
25 July 2017	Cristo González	Real Madrid B	Transfer	€750K	
5 August 2017	Santi Luque	Lorca	Transfer	Free	
29 August 2017	Álex García	Racing Santander	Transfer	Free	

=== Valladolid ===
Manager: Luis César Sampedro (1st season)

==== In ====
Date	Player	From	Type	Fee	Ref
30 June 2017	Luismi	Gimnàstic	Loan return	Free	
30 June 2017	Víctor Pérez	Alcorcón	Loan return	Free	
30 June 2017	Samuel Llorca	Racing Santander	Loan return	Free	
30 June 2017	Iban Salvador	UCAM Murcia	Loan return	Free	
1 July 2017	Anuar	Valladolid B	Promoted		
1 July 2017	Toni Villa	Cultural Leonesa	Transfer	€50K	
3 July 2017	Óscar Plano	Alcorcón	Transfer	Free	
6 July 2017	Nacho	Rayo Vallecano	Transfer	Free	
8 July 2017	Antoñito	Córdoba	Transfer	Free	
10 July 2017	Sulayman Marreh	Watford	Loan	Free	
12 July 2017	Deivid	Córdoba	Transfer	Free	
12 July 2017	Borja Fernández	Almería	Transfer	Free	
12 July 2017	Pablo Hervías	Eibar	Loan	Free	
17 July 2017	Jordi Masip	Barcelona	Transfer	Free	
8 August 2017	Cotán	Sevilla B	Transfer	Undisclosed	
8 August 2017	Fernando Calero	Valladolid B	Promoted		
18 August 2017	Asier Villalibre	Athletic Bilbao	Loan	Free	
22 August 2017	Kiko Olivas	Girona	Transfer	Free	
25 August 2017	Giannis Gianniotas	Olympiacos	Loan	Free	
1 September 2017	Alfredo Ortuño	Las Palmas	Transfer	Free	

==== Out ====
Date	Player	To	Type	Fee	Ref
29 June 2017	Juan Villar	Tenerife	Transfer	Free	
30 June 2017	Joan Jordán	Espanyol	Loan return	Free	
30 June 2017	Dejan Dražić	Celta	Loan return	Free	
30 June 2017	Álex López	Celta	Loan return	Free	
30 June 2017	Raúl de Tomás	Real Madrid B	Loan return	Free	
30 June 2017	Igor Lichnovsky	Porto	Loan return	Free	
30 June 2017	Cristian Espinoza	Villarreal	Loan return	Free	
30 June 2017	Markel Etxeberria	Athletic Bilbao	Loan return	Free	
1 July 2017	Víctor Pérez	TBD		Free	
6 July 2017	Samuel Llorca	Hércules	Transfer	Free	
13 July 2017	André Leão	Paços Ferreira	Transfer	Free	
22 July 2017	Guzmán	Badajoz	Transfer	Free	
28 July 2017	Pau Torres	Cartagena	Transfer	Free	
17 August 2017	Álex Pérez	Sporting Gijón	Transfer	Free	
23 August 2017	Rafa	Pune City	Transfer	Free	
25 August 2017	José Arnáiz	Barcelona B	Transfer	€3.4M	
25 August 2017	Luciano Balbi	Unión Santa Fe	Transfer	Free	

=== Zaragoza ===
Manager: Natxo González (1st season)

==== In ====
Date	Player	From	Type	Fee	Ref
13 June 2017	Alberto Benito	Reus	Transfer	Free	
13 June 2017	Ángel Martínez	Reus	Transfer	Free	
13 June 2017	Íñigo Eguaras	Mirandés	Transfer	Free	
13 June 2017	Simone Grippo	FC Vaduz	Transfer	Free	
13 June 2017	Oliver Buff	FC Zürich	Transfer	Free	
17 June 2017	Giorgi Papunashvili	Dinamo Tbilisi	Transfer	€300K	
30 June 2017	Jorge Díaz	Reus	Loan return	Free	
30 June 2017	Pablo Alcolea	Toledo	Loan return	Free	
30 June 2017	Jorge Ortí	Cultural Leonesa	Loan return	Free	
30 June 2017	Abraham Minero	Levante	Loan return	Free	
30 June 2017	Răzvan Popa	Burgos	Loan return	Free	
1 July 2017	Dani Lasure	Zaragoza B	Promoted		
1 July 2017	Álex Zalaya	Zaragoza B	Promoted		
1 July 2017	Julián Delmás	Zaragoza B	Promoted		
1 July 2017	Jorge Pombo	Zaragoza B	Promoted		
1 July 2017	Raí	Zaragoza B	Promoted		
6 July 2017	Alain Oyarzun	Real Sociedad	Transfer	Free	
6 July 2017	Borja Iglesias	Celta B	Loan	Free	
11 July 2017	Aleix Febas	Real Madrid B	Loan	Free	
17 July 2017	Diogo Verdasca	Porto B	Transfer	Undisclosed	
3 August 2017	Cristian Álvarez	TBD		Free	
4 August 2017	Gaizka Toquero	Alavés	Transfer	Free	
29 August 2017	Mikel González	Real Sociedad	Transfer	Free	
1 September 2017	Vinícius Araújo	Valencia	Transfer	Free	

==== Out ====
Date	Player	To	Type	Fee	Ref
30 June 2017	Rolf Feltscher	Getafe	Loan return	Free	
1 July 2017	Sebastián Saja	Retired			
1 July 2017	Edu García	Bengaluru FC	Transfer	Free	
1 July 2017	José Enrique	TBD		Free	
4 July 2017	Cani	Retired			
5 July 2017	Jorge Díaz	Panetolikos	Transfer	Free	
6 July 2017	Ángel Rodríguez	Getafe	Transfer	Free	
6 July 2017	Abraham Minero	Gimnàstic	Transfer	Free	
6 July 2017	Răzvan Popa	TBD		Free	
9 July 2017	Isaac Carcelén	Cultural Leonesa	Transfer	Undisclosed	
10 July 2017	Marcelo Silva	Real Salt Lake	Transfer	Free	
11 July 2017	Jorge Casado	Xanthi	Transfer	Free	
12 July 2017	Fran Rodríguez	Almería	Transfer	Free	
14 July 2017	Leandro Cabrera	Crotone	Transfer	Free	
20 July 2017	Jorge Ortí	Toledo	Transfer	Free	
31 July 2017	Pablo Alcolea	Toledo	Transfer	Free	
8 August 2017	Georgios Samaras	Samsunspor	Transfer	Free	
15 August 2017	Macky Bagnack	Admira Wacker	Transfer	Free	
23 August 2017	Manu Lanzarote	FC Goa	Transfer	Free	
23 August 2017	Jean Marie Dongou	Gimnàstic	Transfer	Free	
30 August 2017	Álex Barrera	Extremadura	Transfer	Free	
31 August 2017	Edu Bedia	FC Goa	Transfer	Free	
1 September 2017	Jordi Xumetra	TBD		Free	
1 September 2017	Xabi Irureta	Delhi Dynamos	Transfer	Free	
