= 2017–18 AD Alcorcón season =

AD Alcorcón
2017–18 season
- Owner: Roland Duchâtelet
- Chairman: Ignacio Legido
- Manager: Julio Velázquez
- Stadium: Santo Domingo
- Segunda División: -
Home colours	Away colours

The 2017–18 season is the 46th season in AD Alcorcón ’s history.

== Squad ==
As of 13 August 2017

Note: Flags indicate national team as defined under FIFA eligibility rules; some limited exceptions apply. Players may hold more than one non-FIFA nationality.

No.	Pos.	Nation	Player
1	GK	ESP	Casto
2	DF	ESP	Laure
3	DF	ESP	David Navarro
4	DF	ARG	Esteban Burgos
5	MF	ESP	Jon Errasti
6	MF	ESP	Daniel Toribio
7	MF	ESP	Borja Domínguez
8	MF	ESP	Albert Dorca
9	FW	ESP	Jonathan Pereira
10	FW	ESP	Nono
11	FW	ESP	Álvaro Giménez

No.	Pos.	Nation	Player
12	FW	ITA	Nicolao Dumitru
13	GK	ESP	Dani Jiménez
14	FW	ESP	Borja Lázaro
15	MF	ALG	Foued Kadir
16	DF	ESP	Carlos Bellvís (4th captain)
17	DF	ESP	Felipe Alfonso
18	MF	ESP	Álvaro Peña
19	DF	ESP	David Fernández
20	DF	ESP	Hugo Álvarez
21	MF	ESP	Marco Sangalli
22	DF	ESP	César Soriano

=== Transfers ===
- List of Spanish football transfers summer 2017#Alcorcón

==== In ====
Date	Player	From	Type	Fee	Ref
21 June 2017	(Spain) Albert Dorca	(Spain) Elche	Transfer	Free	
22 June 2017	(Spain) Nono	(Spain) UCAM Murcia	Transfer	Free	
23 June 2017	(Spain) Casto	(Spain) Almería	Transfer	Free	
30 June 2017	(Spain) Samu Delgado	(Spain) Cultural Leonesa	Loan return	Free	
30 June 2017	(Spain) Víctor Pastrana	(Spain) Ponferradina	Loan return	Free	
30 June 2017	(Spain) Adrián Diéguez	(Spain) Fuenlabrada	Loan return	Free	
30 June 2017	(Spain) Fernando	(Spain) Hércules	Loan return	Free	
1 July 2017	(Spain) Hugo Álvarez	(Spain) Ucam Murcia	Transfer	Free	
4 July 2017	(Spain) Marco Sangalli	(Spain) Mirandés	Transfer	Free	
5 July 2017	(Spain) Álvaro Peña	(Spain) Racing Santander	Transfer	Free	
5 July 2017	(Spain) Laure	(Spain) Deportivo La Coruña	Transfer	Free	
6 July 2017	(Spain) Borja Domínguez	(Spain) Córdoba	Transfer	€100K	
6 July 2017	(Spain) Borja Lázaro	(Spain) Huesca	Transfer		
7 July 2017	(Argentina) Esteban Burgos	(Argentina) Godoy Cruz	Transfer	Free	
8 July 2017	(Spain) Jonathan Pereira	(Spain) Oviedo	Transfer	Free	
8 July 2017	(Spain) César Soriano	(Spain) Huesca	Transfer	Free	
9 July 2017	(Spain) Felipe Alfonso	(Spain) Villarreal B	Transfer	Free	
11 July 2017	(Spain) Jon Errasti	(Italy) Spezia	Transfer	Free	
14 July 2017	(Spain) David Fernández	(Spain) Oviedo	Transfer	Free	

==== Out ====
Date	Player	To	Type	Fee	Ref
14 June 2017	(Spain) Iván Alejo	(Spain) Eibar	Transfer	€300K	
23 June 2017	(Serbia) Marko Dmitrović	(Spain) Eibar	Transfer	€1M	
29 June 2017	(Spain) David Rodríguez	(Spain) Osasuna	Transfer	€350K	
30 June 2017	(Spain) Pablo Pérez	(Spain) Sporting Gijón	Loan return	Free	
30 June 2017	(Argentina) Carlos Luque	(Brazil) Internacional	Loan return	Free	
30 June 2017	(Spain) Tropi	(Spain) Valencia	Loan return	Free	
30 June 2017	(Spain) Víctor Pérez	(Spain) Valladolid	Loan return	Free	
30 June 2017	(Spain) Unai Elgezabal	(Spain) Eibar	Loan return	Free	
30 June 2017	(Montenegro) Marko Bakić	(Portugal) Braga	Loan return	Free	
1 July 2017	(Spain) Óscar Plano	(Spain) Valladolid	Transfer	Free	
1 July 2017	(Spain) Samu Delgado	(Spain) Cultural Leonesa	Transfer	Free	
1 July 2017	(Portugal) Nélson	TBD		Free	
1 July 2017	(Spain) Fernando	TBD		Free	
4 July 2017	(Spain) Víctor Pastrana	(Spain) Celta B	Transfer	Free	
5 July 2017	(Spain) Adrián Diéguez	(Spain) Deportivo Alavés B	Transfer		
18 July 2017	(Argentina) Fede Vega	(Spain) Murcia	Transfer	Free	
20 July 2017	(Romania) Răzvan Ochiroșii	(Spain) Marbella	Transfer	Free	
22 July 2017	(Cameroon) Lucien Owona	(Spain) Almería	Transfer	€70K	

== Competitions ==
=== Overall ===
Competition	Final position
Segunda División	-
Copa del Rey	-

=== Liga ===
==== League table ====
Pos	Team	Pld	W	D	L	GF	GA	GD	Pts
11	Tenerife	42	15	14	13	58	50	+8	59
12	Lugo	42	15	10	17	39	48	−9	55
13	Alcorcón	42	12	16	14	37	42	−5	52 (Note: Alcorcón finished ahead of Reus and Gimnàstic on head-to-head points: Alcorcón 10 pts, Reus 5 pts, Gimnàstic 1 pt)
14	Reus	42	12	16	14	31	42	−11	52
15	Gimnàstic	42	15	7	20	44	50	−6	52

Source: La Liga
Rules for classification: 1) points; 2) head-to-head points; 3) head-to-head goal difference; 4) goal difference; 5) number of goals scored

==== Matches ====
Kickoff times are in CET. Win Draw Loss

Match	Opponent	Venue	Result
1	Sporting	H	0–0
2	Cádiz	A	0–0
3	Albacete	H	1–0
4	Zaragoza	A	0–1
5	Barcelona B	H	1–1
6	Tenerife	A	4–0
7	Granada	H	1–2
8	Córdoba	A	3–0
9	Valladolid	A	4–0
10	Lugo	H	0–1
11	Nàstic	A	0–3
12	Oviedo	H	2–0
13	Numancia	A	1–0
14	Lorca	H	1–1
15	Osasuna	A	2–3
16	Sevilla At	H	0–0
17	Cultural	A	2–2
18	Huesca	H	1–1
19	Rayo	A	2–1
20	Almería	H	2–0
21	Reus	A	1–1

Match	Opponent	Venue	Result
22	Sporting	A	3–0
23	Cádiz	H	1–0
24	Albacete	A	2–0
25	Zaragoza	H	1–1
26	Barcelona B	A	0–1
27	Tenerife	H	1–1
28	Granada	A	2–0
29	Córdoba	H	1–2
30	Valladolid	H	0–0
31	Lugo	A	2–1
32	Nàstic	H	1–0
33	Oviedo	A	0–1
34	Numancia	H	0–1
35	Lorca	A	1–1
36	Osasuna	H	0–0
37	Sevilla At	A	1–0
38	Cultural	H	0–0
39	Huesca	A	1–1
40	Rayo	H	4–0
41	Almería	A	0–0
42	Reus	H	3–0
