= 2017–18 Cultural y Deportiva Leonesa season =

Cultural y Deportiva Leonesa
2017–18 season
- Chairman: Felipe Llamazares
- Manager: Rubén de la Barrera
- Stadium: Reino de León
- Segunda División: -
Home colours

The 2017–18 season was the 95th season for Cultural y Deportiva Leonesa. They participated in the Spanish LaLiga 1|2|3, and the Copa del Rey.

== Squad ==
As of 26 August 2017

Note: Flags indicate national team as defined under FIFA eligibility rules; some limited exceptions apply. Players may hold more than one non-FIFA nationality.

| No. | Pos. | Nation | Player |
|---|---|---|---|
| 1 | GK | ESP | Jorge Palatsí |
| 2 | DF | ESP | Ángel Bastos |
| 3 | MF | ESP | Viti Díaz (2nd captain) |
| 4 | DF | NED | Gianni Zuiverloon |
| 5 | DF | ESP | Unai Albizua |
| 6 | MF | ESP | Yeray González |
| 7 | MF | ESP | Julen Colinas |
| 8 | MF | ESP | Mario Ortiz |
| 9 | MF | ESP | Iker Guarrotxena |
| 10 | MF | ESP | Samu Delgado |
| 11 | FW | ESP | Ariday Cabrera |
| 12 | FW | ESP | Rodri |

| No. | Pos. | Nation | Player |
|---|---|---|---|
| 13 | GK | ESP | Jesús Fernández |
| 14 | MF | ESP | Yelko Pino (on loan from Lugo) |
| 15 | DF | NED | Ouasim Bouy (on loan from Leeds United) |
| 16 | DF | ESP | Isaac Carcelén |
| 17 | FW | ARG | Emi Buendía (on loan from Getafe) |
| 18 | DF | ESP | Manu |
| 20 | MF | ESP | Josep Señé |
| 21 | MF | ESP | Antonio Martínez (captain) |
| 22 | MF | ARG | Santiago Magallán |
| 23 | DF | QAT | Ahmed Yasser (on loan from Al-Duhail) |
| 24 | DF | ESP | Iván González (3rd captain) |

=== Transfers ===
- List of Spanish football transfers summer 2017#Cultural Leonesa

==== In ====
| Date | Player | From | Type | Fee | Ref |
|---|---|---|---|---|---|
| 30 June 2017 | (Spain) César Morgado | (Spain) Villanovense | Loan return | Free | |
| 1 July 2017 | (Spain) Samu Delgado | (Spain) Alcorcón | Transfer | Free | |
| 4 July 2017 | (Switzerland) Manu | (Spain) Lugo | Transfer | Free | |
| 5 July 2017 | (Spain) Ariday | (Spain) Valencia B | Transfer | Free | |
| 9 July 2017 | (Spain) Pito Camacho | (Spain) Izarra | Transfer | Free | |
| 9 July 2017 | (Spain) Isaac Carcelén | (Spain) Zaragoza | Transfer | Undisclosed | |
| 11 July 2017 | (Spain) Unai Albizua | (Spain) UCAM Murcia | Transfer | Free | |
| 11 July 2017 | (Spain) Alonso | (Spain) Recreativo | Transfer | Free | |
| 12 July 2017 | (Spain) Iván Agudo | (Spain) Badalona | Transfer | Free | |
| 14 July 2017 | (Qatar) Ahmed Yasser | (Qatar) Lekhwiya | Loan | Free | |
| 14 July 2017 | (Spain) Yelko Pino | (Spain) Lugo | Loan | Free | |
| 17 July 2017 | (Argentina) Santiago Magallán | (Argentina) Unión Santa Fe | Transfer | Free | |
| 18 July 2017 | (Spain) Iker Guarrotxena | (Spain) Mirandés | Transfer | Free | |
| 20 July 2017 | (Spain) Josep Señé | (Spain) Celta | Transfer | Undisclosed | |
| 21 July 2017 | (Spain) Jesús Fernández | (Spain) Cádiz | Transfer | Free | |
| 27 July 2017 | (Argentina) Emi Buendía | (Spain) Getafe | Loan | Free | |
| 28 July 2017 | (Spain) Rodri | (Spain) Córdoba | Transfer | Free | |

==== Out ====
| Date | Player | To | Type | Fee | Ref |
|---|---|---|---|---|---|
| 30 June 2017 | (Spain) Iago Díaz | (Spain) Almería | Loan return | Free | |
| 30 June 2017 | (Spain) José León | (Spain) Real Madrid B | Loan return | Free | |
| 30 June 2017 | (Spain) Jorge Ortí | (Spain) Zaragoza | Loan return | Free | |
| 1 July 2017 | (Spain) Toni Villa | (Spain) Valladolid | Transfer | €75K | |
| 3 July 2017 | (Spain) David Forniés | (Spain) Murcia | Transfer | Free | |
| 4 July 2017 | (Spain) Leandro | (Spain) Villanovense | Transfer | Free | |
| 6 July 2017 | (Spain) Jorge Cano | TBD | | Free | |
| 7 July 2017 | (Spain) Benja | (Spain) Elche | transfer | Free | |
| 10 July 2017 | (Spain) Álex Gallar | (Spain) Huesca | Transfer | €400K | |
| 17 July 2017 | (Spain) César Morgado | (Spain) Valencia B | Transfer | Free | |
| 24 July 2017 | (Spain) Guillermo Vallejo | (Spain) Guijuelo | Loan | Free | |

== Competitions ==
=== Overall ===
| Competition | Final position |
|---|---|
| Segunda División | - |
| Copa del Rey | - |

=== Liga ===
==== League table ====
| Pos | Team | Pld | W | D | L | GF | GA | GD | Pts | Promotion, qualification or relegation |
|---|---|---|---|---|---|---|---|---|---|---|
| 17 | Albacete | 42 | 11 | 16 | 15 | 35 | 46 | −11 | 49 | |
| 18 | Almería | 42 | 12 | 12 | 18 | 38 | 45 | −7 | 48 (Note: Almería finished ahead of Cultural Leonesa on head-to head points: Cultural Leonesa 0–0 Almería, Almería 2–1 Cultural Leonesa) | |
| 19 | Cultural Leonesa (R) | 42 | 11 | 15 | 16 | 54 | 67 | −13 | 48 | Relegation to Segunda División B |
| 20 | Barcelona B (R) | 42 | 10 | 14 | 18 | 46 | 54 | −8 | 44 | Relegation to Segunda División B |
| 21 | Lorca FC (Note: Lorca were administratively relegated to the Tercera División due to financial difficulties.) (R) | 42 | 8 | 9 | 25 | 37 | 68 | −31 | 33 | Demotion to Tercera División |

Source: La Liga
Rules for classification: 1) points; 2) head-to-head points; 3) head-to-head goal difference; 4) goal difference; 5) number of goals scored
(R) Relegated

==== Matches ====
Kickoff times are in CET. Win Draw Loss

| Match | Opponent | Venue | Result |
|---|---|---|---|
| 1 | Lorca | A | 2–0 |
| 2 | Osasuna | H | 2–1 |
| 3 | Sevilla At. | A | 1–2 |
| 4 | Valladolid | H | 4–4 |
| 5 | Huesca | H | 3–2 |
| 6 | Rayo | A | 1-3 |
| 7 | Almería | H | 0-0 |
| 8 | Reus | A | 1-1 |
| 9 | Sporting | H | 0-2 |
| 10 | Cádiz | A | 2-2 |
| 11 | Albacete | H | 0-0 |
| 12 | Zaragoza | A | 0-0 |
| 13 | Barcelona B | H | 1-1 |
| 14 | Tenerife | A | 0-2 |
| 15 | Granada | H | 1-1 |
| 16 | Córdoba | A | 2-2 |
| 17 | Alcorcón | H | 2-2 |
| 18 | Lugo | A | 1-3 |
| 19 | Nàstic | H | 2-0 |
| 20 | Oviedo | A | 0-3 |
| 21 | Numancia | H | 2-2 |

| Match | Opponent | Venue | Result |
|---|---|---|---|
| 22 | | | – |
| 23 | | | – |
| 24 | | | – |
| 25 | | | – |
| 26 | | | – |
| 27 | | | – |
| 28 | | | – |
| 29 | | | – |
| 30 | | | – |
| 31 | | | – |
| 32 | | | – |
| 33 | | | – |
| 34 | | | – |
| 35 | | | – |
| 36 | | | – |
| 37 | | | – |
| 38 | | | – |
| 39 | | | – |
| 40 | | | – |
| 41 | | | – |
| 42 | | | – |
