= Santi Luque =

Spanish footballer

Personal information
- Full name: Santiago Jiménez Luque
- Date of birth: 12 January 1993 (age 33)
- Place of birth: Málaga, Spain
- Height: 1.71 m (5 ft 7 1/2 in)
- Position: Winger

Team information
- Current team: San Pedro

Youth career
- 26 de Febrero
- 2011–2012: Puerto Malagueño
- 2012: Betis

Senior career*
Years	Team	Apps	(Gls)
2012	Betis B	9	(1)
2012–2013	San Roque	19	(0)
2013–2014	Ronda	11	(1)
2014–2015	Tenerife B	38	(8)
2015–2017	Tenerife	1	(0)
2015–2016	→ Algeciras (loan)	35	(3)
2016–2017	→ Melilla (loan)	34	(6)
2017–2018	Lorca	1	(0)
2017–2018	→ Recreativo (loan)	16	(0)
2018–2019	Écija Balompié	15	(2)
2019	Salamanca	14	(1)
2019	Guaraní	0	(0)
2020	Linense	8	(1)
2020–2021	Alhaurín de la Torre	16	(1)
2021–2023	Coria	59	(7)
2023	Lincoln Red Imps	0	(0)
2023–2024	El Palo	30	(2)
2024–2025	Badajoz	34	(0)
2025–	San Pedro	10	(1)
- * Club domestic league appearances and goals as of 9 November 2025

Santiago "Santi" Jiménez Luque (born 12 January 1993) is a Spanish footballer who plays as a left winger for Tercera Federación club San Pedro.

== Club career ==
Born in Málaga, Andalusia, Luque graduated from Real Betis' youth setup, after spells it out at CD 26 de Febrero and CD Puerto Malagueño. He made his debuts as a senior with the former's reserves in the 2011–12 campaign, in the Segunda División B.

In August 2012 Luque moved to CD San Roque de Lepe also in the third level. He appeared more regularly with the side, but moved to Tercera División club CD Ronda in the 2013 summer.

On 1 February 2014 Luque joined another reserve team, CD Tenerife B also in the fourth level. On 14 February 2015 he played his first match as a professional, coming on as a second half substitute for fellow youth graduate Víctor García in a 1–1 away draw against CD Mirandés in the Segunda División.

On 23 July 2015, Luque was loaned to Algeciras CF of the third tier. On 7 August of the following year, he moved to UD Melilla also in a temporary deal.

On 5 August 2017, Luque signed a two-year contract with fellow second-tier club Lorca FC, after cutting ties with the Canarians. Ten days later, however, he was loaned to third-tier club Recreativo de Huelva for one year.

On 18 January 2018, Luque's loan was cut short.
