= Josep Señé =

Spanish footballer

Personal information
- Full name: Josep Señé Escudero
- Date of birth: 10 December 1991 (age 34)
- Place of birth: Sant Cugat, Spain
- Height: 1.86 m (6 ft 1 in)
- Position: Winger

Team information
- Current team: Vilanova

Youth career
- Sant Cugat
- Terrassa

Senior career*
Years	Team	Apps	(Gls)
2010	Terrassa	10	(3)
2010–2013	Real Madrid C	30	(3)
2012–2013	→ Oviedo (loan)	15	(2)
2013–2015	Oviedo	45	(6)
2015	Celta B	16	(4)
2015–2017	Celta	21	(0)
2017–2019	Cultural Leonesa	66	(10)
2019–2021	Mallorca	6	(0)
2020–2021	→ Castellón (loan)	39	(2)
2021–2023	Lugo	71	(6)
2023–2025	Racing Ferrol	68	(7)
2025–2026	Ibiza	11	(0)
2026	Sant Andreu	11	(2)
2026–	Vilanova	7	(1)
- * Club domestic league appearances and goals as of 15:58, 9 November 2026 (UTC)

Josep Señé Escudero (born 10 December 1991) is a Spanish professional footballer who plays as a right winger for Tercera Federación club Vilanova.

== Club career ==
Born in Sant Cugat del Vallès, Barcelona, Catalonia, Señé finished his development with Terrassa FC after starting out at Sant Cugat Esport i Junior, and made his senior debut with the former club in 2010, in the Segunda División B. In July of that year he joined Real Madrid, being assigned to the C team in the Tercera División.

On 30 July 2012, Señé was loaned to Real Oviedo of the third division for one year. In July 2013, he signed a permanent one-year deal after his contract with Real Madrid expired.

Señé cut ties with the Asturian side on 24 January 2015. The following day, he joined RC Celta de Vigo on a one-year contract, being assigned to the reserves also in the third tier.

On 29 July 2015, Señé was promoted to Celta's main squad in La Liga. He made his professional debut on 28 November, coming on as a late substitute for Fabián Orellana in a 2–1 home win against Sporting de Gijón.

On 20 July 2017, Señé was transferred to Cultural y Deportiva Leonesa of Segunda División. On 10 July 2019, he agreed to a three-year contract with RCD Mallorca, recently returned to the top flight. He appeared in only eight competitives matches during the season, in an eventual relegation.

Señé was loaned to division two club CD Castellón on 14 August 2020, for one year. He was first-choice during the campaign and scored two goals, being relegated.

On 3 August 2021, Señé signed a two-year deal with fellow second-tier CD Lugo. On 4 July 2023, after their relegation, he moved to Racing de Ferrol in the same league.

Señé competed in the lower and amateur leagues until his retirement, representing UD Ibiza, UE Sant Andreu and CF Vilanova.

== Career statistics ==
As of match played 28 May 2022

Appearances and goals by club, season and competition
Club	Season	League			National Cup		Continental		Other		Total	
Club	Season	Division	Apps	Goals	Apps	Goals	Apps	Goals	Apps	Goals	Apps	Goals
Terrassa	2009–10	Segunda División B	10	3	—		—		—		10	3
Oviedo (loan)	2012–13	Segunda División B	15	2	0	0	—		4 (Note: Appearances in Segunda División B play-offs)	0	19	2
Oviedo	2013–14	Segunda División B	32	4	1	0	—		—		33	4
Oviedo	2014–15	Segunda División B	13	2	3	0	—		—		16	2
Oviedo	Total		60	8	4	0	0	0	4	0	68	8
Celta B	2014–15	Segunda División B	16	4	—		—		—		16	4
Celta	2015–16	La Liga	8	0	5	0	—		—		13	0
Celta	2016–17	La Liga	13	0	3	0	3 (Note: Appearances in UEFA Europa League)	0	—		19	0
Celta	Total		21	0	8	0	3	0	0	0	32	0
Cultural Leonesa	2017–18	Segunda División	41	8	1	0	—		—		42	8
Cultural Leonesa	2018–19	Segunda División B	25	2	4	1	—		—		29	3
Cultural Leonesa	Total		66	10	5	1	0	0	0	0	91	11
Mallorca	2019–20	La Liga	6	0	2	0	—		—		8	0
Castellón (loan)	2020–21	Segunda División	39	2	0	0	—		—		39	2
Lugo	2021–22	Segunda División	38	4	1	0	—		—		39	4
Career total			256	31	20	1	3	0	4	0	283	32
