= Alberto Quintana (footballer, born 1996) =

Spanish footballer

Personal information
- Full name: Alberto Pérez Quintana
- Date of birth: 29 April 1996 (age 30)
- Place of birth: Cádiz, Spain
- Height: 1.72 m (5 ft 7 1/2 in)
- Position: Midfielder

Team information
- Current team: Europa
- Number: 10

Youth career
- Balón de Cádiz
- 2013–2015: Cádiz

Senior career*
Years	Team	Apps	(Gls)
2014–2016	Cádiz B	22	(0)
2016–2017	Cádiz	13	(0)
2016	→ Cartagena (loan)	6	(0)
2017	→ Rayo Majadahonda (loan)	13	(1)
2017–2019	Levante B	40	(2)
2019	Vélez	4	(0)
2019–2020	Arcos	18	(2)
2020–2021	Alzira	26	(0)
2021–2022	Conil	30	(0)
2022–2023	Elche B	27	(0)
2023–	Europa	75	(2)
- * Club domestic league appearances and goals as of 21 November 2026

Alberto Pérez Quintana (born 29 April 1996) is a Spanish footballer who plays for Gibraltar Football League club Europa as a central midfielder.

== Club career ==
Born in Cádiz, Andalusia, Quintana was a Cádiz CF youth graduate. On 15 December 2014, shortly after making his senior debut with the reserves, he signed a contract extension with the club, running until 2018.

On 17 May 2015, as the Yellow Submarine was already qualified to the play-offs, he made his first team debut by starting in a 0–3 away loss against Arroyo CP in the Segunda División B championship. The following campaign, he contributed with 11 appearances as his side returned to Segunda División after six years.

Quintana made his professional debut on 19 August 2016, coming on as a second-half substitute for Migue in a 1–1 away draw against UD Almería. Three days later, he was loaned to third-tier club FC Cartagena, in a season-long deal.

After being sparingly used, Quintana was recalled by Cádiz and loaned back to CF Rayo Majadahonda on 28 December 2016, until the following June. The following 17 August, he joined another reserve team, Atlético Levante UD in Tercera División.
