= Felipe Alfonso =

Spanish footballer

Personal information
- Full name: Felipe Alfonso Criado
- Date of birth: 14 April 1993 (age 33)
- Place of birth: Valladolid, Spain
- Height: 1.76 m (5 ft 9 in)
- Position: Right-back

Team information
- Current team: Mérida
- Number: 19

Youth career
- 2002–2010: Valladolid

Senior career*
Years	Team	Apps	(Gls)
2010–2012	Valladolid B	54	(1)
2011	Valladolid	1	(0)
2012–2017	Villarreal B	97	(3)
2017–2019	Alcorcón	10	(0)
2019–2020	Hércules	8	(0)
2020–2021	Mérida	12	(0)
2021–	Mérida	140	(5)

International career
2010	Spain U17	1	(0)
- * Club domestic league appearances and goals as of 9 June 2026

Felipe Alfonso Criado (born 14 April 1993) is a Spanish footballer who plays for Mérida AD as a right-back.

== Club career ==
Born in Valladolid, Castile and León, Alfonso was a youth product at local club Real Valladolid, making his senior debut with the B side and going on to spend two seasons in the Tercera División with them. On 22 October 2011 he made his debut with the first team, starting and playing 80 minutes in a 2–1 Segunda División home win against CD Numancia.

Alfonso joined Villarreal CF B of Segunda División B on 22 June 2012. On 25 August 2015, having established himself as a starter and captain of the reserves, he suffered a severe knee injury which sidelined him for the entire season.

On 9 July 2017, Alfonso returned to the second tier after signing a contract with AD Alcorcón. On 5 July 2019, he moved to Hércules CF in the third division.

Alfonso continued competing in the lower leagues subsequently, having two spells at Mérida AD.
