= Fernando Román (footballer, born 1993) =

Spanish footballer

Personal information
- Full name: Fernando Román Álvarez
- Date of birth: 20 August 1993 (age 33)
- Place of birth: Madrid, Spain
- Height: 1.93 m (6 ft 4 in)
- Position: Centre-back

Team information
- Current team: UCAM Murcia
- Number: 5

Youth career
- Colegio San Agustín
- Unión Adarve
- Real Madrid

Senior career*
Years	Team	Apps	(Gls)
2012	Unión Adarve B		
2012–2014	Unión Adarve	62	(3)
2014–2015	Alcorcón B	19	(1)
2015–2017	Alcorcón	27	(1)
2016–2017	→ Hércules (loan)	33	(2)
2017–2018	Ponferradina	26	(2)
2018–2019	Valencia B	32	(0)
2019–2021	Córdoba	4	(0)
2020–2021	→ Marbella (loan)	4	(0)
2021–2022	Unionistas de Salamanca	15	(1)
2022–2023	Numancia	44	(5)
2023–2024	Sanluqueño	32	(0)
2024–	UCAM Murcia	41	(3)
- * Club domestic league appearances and goals as of 15 May 2026

Fernando Román Álvarez (born 20 August 1993) is a Spanish footballer who plays as a centre-back for UCAM Murcia.

== Football career ==
A product of Real Madrid's youth system, Román made his senior debuts in 2012–13 with AD Unión Adarve's reserves in the lower leagues, being promoted to the main squad in Tercera División shortly after. On 21 June 2014 he joined AD Alcorcón, being assigned to the B-team also in the fourth level.

Román played his first match as a professional on 1 February 2015, starting in a 0–3 away loss against Girona FC in the Segunda División championship. He scored his first goal in the category on 17 October, but in a 2–3 loss at Real Oviedo.

On 1 August 2016, Román was loaned to Hércules CF in Segunda División B, for one year. He continued to appear in the category in the following years, representing SD Ponferradina, Valencia CF Mestalla and Córdoba CF. On 13 January 2020, Román was loaned out to Marbella FC until the summer 2021. In the first half of the 2021-22 season, Román played for Unionistas de Salamanca, before joining CD Numancia in January 2022. He left Numancia in the summer 2023.

On 15 July 2024, Román joined UCAM Murcia in the fourth tier.

== Personal life ==
Román's elder brother, Juan Carlos, is also a footballer and a defender. He too was groomed at Unión Adarve. His father, Juanqui, was a professional handball player and represented Spain in more than 30 occasions.
