= Leandro Montagud =

Spanish footballer

Leandro
Personal information
- Full name: Leandro Montagud Balaguer
- Date of birth: 28 February 1989 (age 37)
- Place of birth: Alzira, Spain
- Height: 1.86 m (6 ft 1 in)
- Position: Goalkeeper

Team information
- Current team: Alzira
- Number: 13

Youth career
- Elche

Senior career*
Years	Team	Apps	(Gls)
2006–2010	Elche B	91	(0)
2010–2011	Torrellano Illice	22	(0)
2010–2013	Elche	7	(0)
2012–2013	→ Ponferradina (loan)	2	(0)
2013–2014	Levante B	32	(0)
2014–2017	Cultural Leonesa	53	(0)
2017–2018	Villanovense	35	(0)
2018–2019	Mallorca	0	(0)
2019–2020	Cultural Leonesa	30	(0)
2020–2021	Orihuela	18	(0)
2021–2023	Ceuta	47	(0)
2023	Torrent	13	(0)
2023–	Alzira	1	(0)
- * Club domestic league appearances and goals as of 20:25, 19 January 2023 (UTC)

Leandro Montagud Balaguer (born 28 February 1989), known simply as Leandro, is a Spanish footballer who plays as a goalkeeper for Alzira.

== Club career ==
A product of Elche CF's youth academy, Leandro was born in Alzira, Valencia, and was promoted to the first team for 2009–10 in the Segunda División, acting as third-choice behind Willy Caballero and Jaime as well as still appearing for the reserves. He made his debut for them on 20 March 2010 in a 2–1 home win against Albacete Balompié as the former was sent off, one of only two appearances during the season.

In the following season, Leandro played for Torrellano Illice CF, who at that time acted as the farm team. He featured for the main squad late into the campaign, in a 3–3 draw at Granada CF.

Leandro signed with second-division club SD Ponferradina on 30 July 2012, in a season-long loan. Roughly one year later, he agreed terms with Atlético Levante UD after the expiry of his contract with Elche.

On 10 July 2014, Leandro moved to Cultural y Deportiva Leonesa also of division three. He achieved promotion in 2016–17, but contributed only five matches to the feat (playoffs included).

On 4 July 2017, Leandro signed for CF Villanovense of the third tier. On 6 July of the following year, he agreed to a two-year contract at RCD Mallorca in the level above; he spent the 2018–19 campaign playing second-fiddle to Manolo Reina and Miquel Parera, as the team achieved promotion to La Liga.

Leandro returned to Cultural in July 2019, on a two-year deal. On 30 September 2020, he joined Orihuela CF.

== Honours ==
Cultural Leonesa

- Segunda División B: 2016–17
