= César Morgado =

Spanish footballer

Personal information
- Full name: César Morgado Ortega
- Date of birth: 26 January 1993 (age 33)
- Place of birth: Barcelona, Spain
- Height: 1.85 m (6 ft 1 in)
- Position: Centre-back

Youth career
- CD Badajoz
- 2005–2009: Flecha Negra
- 2009–2011: Villarreal
- 2011–2012: Atlético Madrid

Senior career*
Years	Team	Apps	(Gls)
2012–2014	Badajoz CF	56	(10)
2014–2015	Córdoba B	32	(2)
2015–2016	Mérida	35	(4)
2016–2017	Cultural Leonesa	9	(0)
2017	→ Villanovense (loan)	15	(1)
2017–2018	Valencia B	18	(1)
2018–2021	CD Badajoz	74	(6)
2021–2023	Sabadell	41	(4)
2023–2024	Lugo	29	(0)
2024–2025	Andorra	19	(0)
2025–2026	Gimnàstic	16	(1)
- * Club domestic league appearances and goals as of 20 December 2025

César Morgado Ortega (born 26 January 1993) is a Spanish footballer who plays as a centre-back.

== Club career ==
Born in Barcelona, Catalonia, Morgado moved to Badajoz, Extremadura with six months of age after his father joined CD Badajoz. He also began his career at the club, and later played for CP Flecha Negra, Villarreal CF and Atlético Madrid as a youth.

In 2012, after finishing his formation, Morgado joined Tercera División side UD Badajoz, and renewed his contract with the club (now named Badajoz CF) on 5 July 2013. Roughly one year later, he moved to Córdoba CF and was initially assigned to the reserves in Segunda División B.

On 5 August 2015, after suffering relegation, Morgado agreed to a deal with third division side Mérida AD. He moved to fellow league team Cultural y Deportiva Leonesa the following 16 June, but was loaned to CF Villanovense in the same category on 23 January 2017, after being rarely used.

On 17 July 2017, Morgado signed for another reserve team, Valencia CF Mestalla still in division three. The following 30 June, he returned to his first club CD Badajoz, now as a first-team member.

On 15 August 2021, after three seasons as a regular starter, Morgado joined CE Sabadell FC of the newly-created Primera División RFEF. He continued to play in that division in the following seasons, representing CD Lugo, FC Andorra and Gimnàstic de Tarragona; he helped Andorra to achieve promotion to Segunda División in the 2024–25 season, but as a backup.

== International career ==
In January 2009, Morgado was called up to trainings with the Spain national under-16 team.

== Personal life ==
Morgado's father Sergio was also a footballer in the same position. He also played for Atlético as a youth, and later went on to feature in La Liga with the club.
