= Jorge Ortí =

Spanish footballer

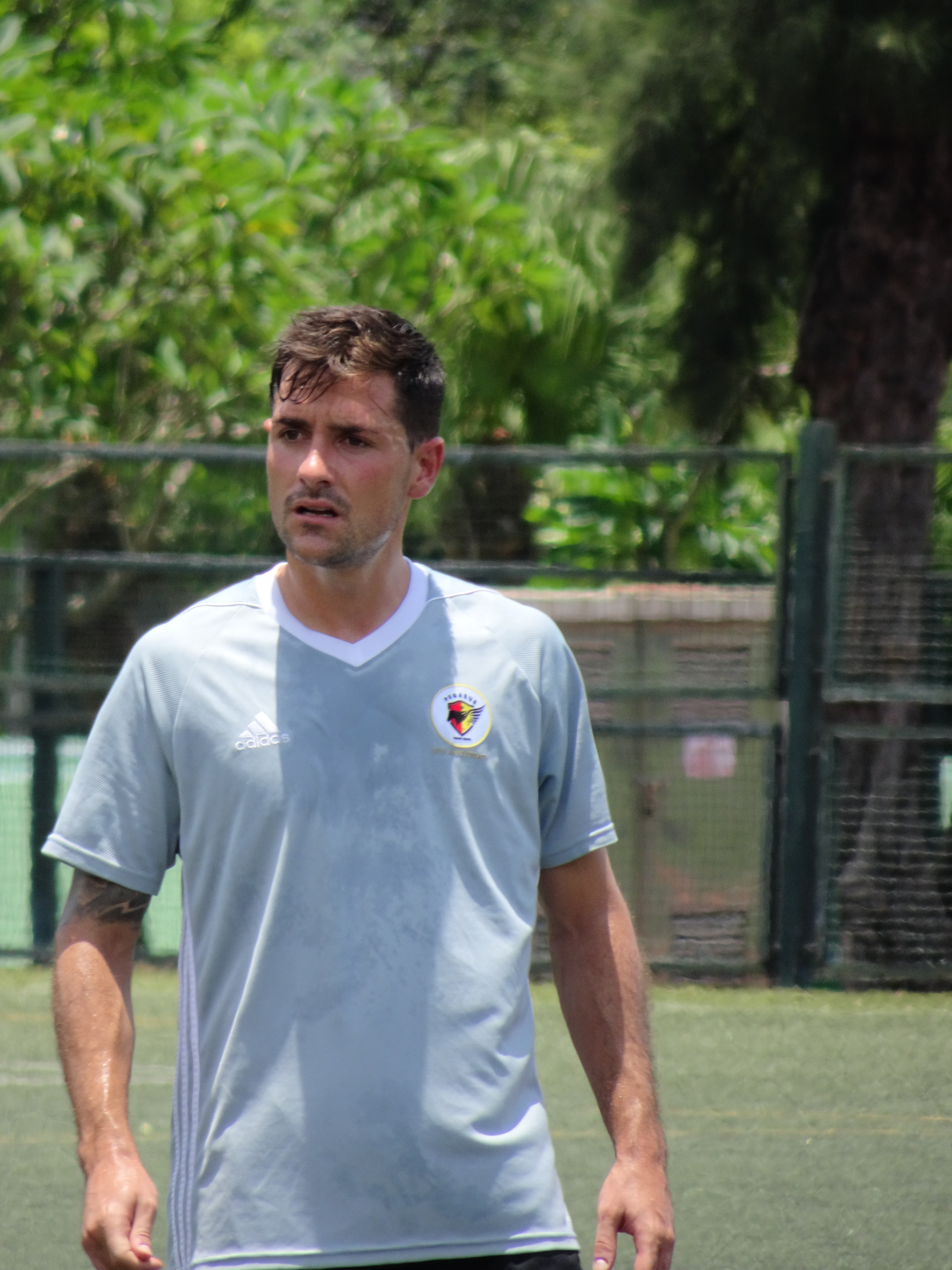

Personal information
- Full name: Jorge Ortí Gracia
- Date of birth: 28 April 1993 (age 33)
- Place of birth: Zaragoza, Spain
- Height: 1.80 m (5 ft 11 in)
- Position: Forward

Youth career
- 2004–2010: Zaragoza

Senior career*
Years	Team	Apps	(Gls)
2010–2015	Zaragoza B	75	(24)
2011–2017	Zaragoza	24	(0)
2014	→ Villarreal B (loan)	7	(0)
2016–2017	→ Cultural Leonesa (loan)	32	(9)
2017–2018	Toledo	25	(3)
2019	Teruel	12	(4)
2019	Pegasus	1	(0)
Total		176	(40)

International career
2009	Spain U16	3	(1)
2009–2010	Spain U17	8	(3)
- * Club domestic league appearances and goals

Jorge Ortí Gracia (born 28 April 1993) is a Spanish former professional footballer who played as a forward.

== Club career ==
=== Zaragoza ===
A product of Real Zaragoza's youth system, Ortí was born in Zaragoza, Aragon, and made his first-team – and La Liga – debut on 26 October 2011 against Valencia CF, coming on as a substitute for Hélder Postiga in the 76th minute of a 0–1 home defeat. He spent several seasons as a senior mainly registered with the reserves, however.

Ortiz made 29 total appearances for the club's main squad. He scored his only goal on 13 December 2011, opening the 1–1 draw at AD Alcorcón in the round of 32 of the Copa del Rey.

=== Later career ===
On 24 January 2014, Ortí joined Villarreal CF B in Segunda División B on loan until the end of the campaign. On 7 July 2016, in another temporary deal, he signed for Cultural y Deportiva Leonesa of the same league.

After achieving promotion from the third tier as champions, Ortí terminated his contract with Zaragoza on 20 July 2017. He continued playing in the lower leagues, with CD Toledo and CD Teruel.

On 16 July 2019, Hong Kong Premier League side Hong Kong Pegasus FC announced the signing of Ortí. He eventually retired aged only 27, having undergone six knee surgeries.

== Honours ==
Cultural Leonesa

- Segunda División B: 2016–17
