= Nono (footballer, born 1991) =

Spanish footballer

Personal information
- Full name: David González Plata
- Date of birth: 28 May 1991 (age 35)
- Place of birth: Badajoz, Spain
- Height: 1.70 m (5 ft 7 in)
- Position: Winger

Team information
- Current team: Korona Kielce
- Number: 10

Youth career
- Flecha Negra
- 2008–2010: Rayo Vallecano

Senior career*
Years	Team	Apps	(Gls)
2010–2013	Rayo B	65	(6)
2010	Rayo Vallecano	1	(0)
2013–2014	Almería B	33	(7)
2014–2017	UCAM Murcia	112	(8)
2017–2019	Alcorcón	53	(3)
2019–2020	Extremadura	39	(6)
2020–2021	Tenerife	40	(0)
2021–2022	Ibiza	22	(2)
2023–	Korona Kielce	81	(4)
- * Club domestic league appearances and goals as of 21:10, 29 May 2026 (UTC)

David González Plata (born 28 May 1991), known as Nono, is a Spanish professional footballer who plays as a winger for Ekstraklasa club Korona Kielce.

== Club career ==
Nono was born in Badajoz, Extremadura. After finishing his formation with Rayo Vallecano, he made his senior debuts with the B-team in the 2009–10 season, being promoted from the Tercera División.

On 16 June 2010, Nono appeared in his first match as professional, playing the last 13 minutes of a 4–0 home win over Recreativo de Huelva in the Segunda División. He continued to be all but associated with the reserves during his spell, however.

In August 2013, Nono signed with UD Almería B from the Segunda División B. On 24 July of the following year he moved to UCAM Murcia CF, also in the third level. He was a regular starter for the club during the following campaigns, helping in their first-ever promotion to the second level.

Nono scored his first professional goal on 2 October 2016, netting the equalizer in a 2–2 home draw against CD Mirandés. The following 22 June, he signed a two-year contract with fellow second division club AD Alcorcón.

On 2 July 2019, Nono signed a five-year deal with Extremadura UD, still in the second division, but left the club a year later after their relegation. On 14 September 2020, he agreed to a three-year contract with fellow league team CD Tenerife.

On 31 August 2021, Nono terminated his contract with Tenerife, and signed a two-year deal with UD Ibiza just hours later. On 9 September 2022, his contract with Ibiza was terminated by mutual consent.

On 8 December 2022, Nono joined Polish Ekstraklasa club Korona Kielce on a one-and-a-half-year contract.
