= Tropi (footballer) =

Spanish footballer (born 1995)

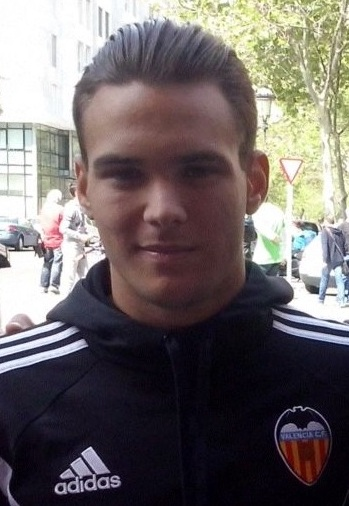

Personal information
- Full name: Carlos Carbonell Gil
- Date of birth: 12 May 1995 (age 31)
- Place of birth: Valencia, Spain
- Height: 1.73 m (5 ft 8 in)
- Position: Midfielder

Team information
- Current team: Águilas FC
- Number: 5

Youth career
- 2002–2014: Valencia
- 2009–2010: → Cracks (loan)

Senior career*
| Years | Team | Apps | (Gls) |
| 2014–2016 | Valencia B | 63 | (3) |
| 2015–2018 | Valencia | 2 | (0) |
| 2016–2017 | → Alcorcón (loan) | 19 | (0) |
| 2017–2018 | → Lorca (loan) | 30 | (1) |
| 2018–2019 | Recreativo | 36 | (2) |
| 2019–2020 | Atlético Madrid B | 16 | (1) |
| 2020–2022 | UCAM Murcia | 22 | (0) |
| 2022 | Rayo Majadahonda | 12 | (1) |
| 2022–2023 | Unionistas de Salamanca CF | 20 | (2) |
| 2023 | CD Atlético Baleares | 16 | (1) |
| 2023–2025 | Águilas FC | 60 | (3) |
- * Club domestic league appearances and goals as of 4 August 2025

Carlos Carbonell Gil (born 12 May 1995), commonly known as Tropi, is a Spanish former professional footballer who played as a midfielder, most recently for Segunda Federación club Águilas FC.

== Club career ==
Born in Valencia, Valencian Community, Tropi joined Valencia CF's youth setup in 2002, aged seven. He was promoted to the reserves in July 2014 and made his senior debut on 24 August, starting in a 1–2 away loss against RCD Mallorca B in the Segunda División B.

On 25 January 2015, Tropi scored his first senior goal in a 1–1 home draw against Huracán Valencia CF. A day later, he was called up to the main squad by manager Nuno Espírito Santo.

After being an unused substitute in a 1–0 home win against Getafe CF on 15 February 2015, Tropi made his first team – and La Liga – debut on 20 March 2015, coming on as a late substitute for Dani Parejo in a 4–0 away win over Elche CF. On 25 July 2016, he was loaned to Segunda División side AD Alcorcón for two years.

On 11 July 2017, Tropi joined fellow second-tier club Lorca FC. He left Valencia on 30 June of the following year as his contract was not renewed, and signed a one-year deal with Recreativo de Huelva on 15 August. On 19 July 2019, Tropi signed a two-year contract with another reserve team, Atlético Madrid B also at the third level. The following year, in September 2020, he signed with UCAM Murcia.

On 27 January 2022, Tropi moved to Primera División RFEF club Rayo Majadahonda.

In January 2023, Tropi joined CD Atlético Baleares in the third level Primera Federación on a deal until the end of the season.

On 22 August 2023, he joined Águilas FC of the fourth level Segunda Federación on a one-year contract, later extended to two years.

== Club statistics ==
As of 25 July 2016

| Club | Season | League | | Cup | | Continental | | Total | |
| Club | Season | Apps | Goals | Apps | Goals | Apps | Goals | Apps | Goals |
|---|---|---|---|---|---|---|---|---|---|
| Valencia B | 2014–15 | 28 | 1 | — | | — | | 28 | 1 |
| Valencia | 2014–15 | 1 | 0 | 0 | 0 | — | | 1 | 0 |
| Valencia B | 2015–16 | 15 | 2 | — | | — | | 15 | 2 |
| Valencia | 2015–16 | 1 | 0 | 0 | 0 | 1 | 0 | 2 | 0 |
| Career total | | 45 | 3 | 0 | 0 | 1 | 0 | 46 | 3 |
