= Santiago Magallán =

Argentine footballer

Personal information
- Date of birth: 8 May 1992 (age 34)
- Place of birth: La Plata, Argentina
- Height: 1.85 m (6 ft 1 in)
- Position: Midfielder

Youth career
- Gimnasia La Plata

Senior career*
Years	Team	Apps	(Gls)
2011–2013	Gimnasia La Plata	0	(0)
2013–2014	San Lorenzo	0	(0)
2015	Temperley	6	(0)
2016	Defensa y Justicia	0	(0)
2017	Unión Santa Fe	10	(0)
2017–2019	Cultural Leonesa	0	(0)
2018–2019	→ Badalona (loan)	21	(5)
2019–2021	Llagostera	29	(6)
- * Club domestic league appearances and goals as of 23 May 2021

Santiago Magallán (born 8 May 1992) is an Argentine footballer who plays as a midfielder.
