= Samu Delgado =

Spanish footballer (born 1993)

Personal information
- Full name: Samuel Delgado Serna
- Date of birth: 2 July 1993 (age 33)
- Place of birth: Belmonte, Spain
- Height: 1.78 m (5 ft 10 in)
- Position: Winger

Youth career
- 2001–2012: Albacete

Senior career*
Years	Team	Apps	(Gls)
2012–2013	Albacete B	30	(4)
2013–2017	Albacete	98	(10)
2016–2017	→ Alcorcón (loan)	11	(0)
2017	Alcorcón	0	(0)
2017	→ Cultural Leonesa (loan)	2	(0)
2017–2019	Cultural Leonesa	21	(3)
2019–2020	Marbella	39	(4)
2020–2022	Córdoba	8	(1)
- * Club domestic league appearances and goals

Samuel Delgado Serna (born 2 July 1993), known as Samu Delgado or simply Samu, is a Spanish former footballer who played as a right winger.

== Club career ==
Born in Belmonte, Cuenca, Castilla-La Mancha, Samu graduated from Albacete Balompié's youth setup, and made senior debuts with the reserves in the 2011–12 campaign, in Tercera División. In the following season he began appearing with the main squad in Segunda División B.

Samu was definitely promoted to the first team in July 2013, and appeared in 31 matches as Alba returned to Segunda División after a three-year absence. On 24 August 2014 he played his first match as a professional, replacing Portu in a 2–3 home loss against AD Alcorcón.

Samu scored his first professional goal on 30 November, netting the last in a 2–1 away win against FC Barcelona B. On 11 July 2016, after suffering relegation, he was loaned to fellow league team AD Alcorcón for one year.

Samu joined the Alfareros permanently on 31 January 2017, and was immediately loaned to Cultural Leonesa in the third division.

== Honours ==
Cultural Leonesa

- Segunda División B: 2016–17
