= 2014–15 Copa del Rey =

Copa del Rey
113th Copa del Rey

Tournament details
- Country: Spain
- Teams: 83

Final positions
- Champions: Barcelona (27th title)
- Runners-up: Athletic Bilbao

Tournament statistics
- Matches played: 109
- Goals scored: 297 (2.72 per match)
- Top goal scorer(s): Iago Aspas; Neymar (7 goals each)

The 2014–15 Copa del Rey was the 113th staging of the Copa del Rey (including two seasons where two rival editions were played). The winners assure a place for the group stage of the 2015–16 UEFA Europa League.

Real Madrid were the defending champions, but were eliminated by Atlético Madrid 2–4 on aggregate in the round of 16.

Barcelona won the tournament by defeating Athletic Bilbao in the final, 3–1, thus achieving their record-extending 27th title.

== Schedule and format ==
The fixtures' schedule was released by the RFEF and the LFP on 30 May 2014 and the format is identical to the previous season.

Round	Draw date	Date	Fixtures	Clubs	Format details
First round	31 July 2014	3 September 2014	18	83 → 65	New entries: Clubs participating in Tercera and Segunda División B will gain entry. Byes: Seven teams from Segunda División B will receive a bye. Opponents seeding: Teams will face each other according to proximity criteria. Local team seeding: Draw of lots. Knock-out tournament type: Single match Copa Federación qualification: losers will qualify for 2014–15 Copa Federación, National phase.
Second round	31 July 2014	10 September 2014	22	65 → 43	New entries: Clubs participating in Segunda División will gain entry. Byes: One team from the first round will receive a bye. Opponents seeding: Segunda División teams will face each other. Local team seeding: Draw of lots. Knock-out tournament type: Single match
Third round	22 September 2014	15 October 2014	11	43 → 32	Byes: One team from Segunda División B or Tercera División, which previously didn't receive a bye, will receive one. Opponents seeding: Segunda División teams will face each other. Local team seeding: Draw of lots. Knock-out tournament type: Single match
Round of 32	17 October 2014	29 October 2014 (see notes); 3 December 2014	16	32 → 16	New entries: Clubs participating in La Liga will gain entry. Opponents seeding: The seven teams from La Liga which were qualified for 2013–14 UEFA competitions, will face against remaining seven teams from Segunda División B and Tercera División. The five remaining Segunda División teams will face against La Liga teams. The eight remaining La Liga teams will face each other. Local team seeding: First leg at home of team in lower division. Knock-out tournament type: Double match
Round of 32	17 October 2014	3 December 2014 (see notes); 17 December 2014	16	32 → 16	New entries: Clubs participating in La Liga will gain entry. Opponents seeding: The seven teams from La Liga which were qualified for 2013–14 UEFA competitions, will face against remaining seven teams from Segunda División B and Tercera División. The five remaining Segunda División teams will face against La Liga teams. The eight remaining La Liga teams will face each other. Local team seeding: First leg at home of team in lower division. Knock-out tournament type: Double match
Round of 16	17 October 2014	7 January 2015	8	16 → 8	Opponents seeding: Draw of lots. Local team seeding: First leg at home of team in lower division. Knock-out tournament type: Double match
Round of 16	17 October 2014	14 January 2015	8	16 → 8	Opponents seeding: Draw of lots. Local team seeding: First leg at home of team in lower division. Knock-out tournament type: Double match
Quarter-finals	17 October 2014	21 January 2015	4	8 → 4	Opponents seeding: Draw of lots. Local team seeding: Luck of the draw. Knock-out tournament type: Double match
Quarter-finals	17 October 2014	28 January 2015	4	8 → 4	Opponents seeding: Draw of lots. Local team seeding: Luck of the draw. Knock-out tournament type: Double match
Semifinals	17 October 2014	11 February 2015	2	4 → 2	Opponents seeding: Draw of lots. Local team seeding: Luck of the draw. Knock-out tournament type: Double match
Semifinals	17 October 2014	4 March 2015	2	4 → 2	Opponents seeding: Draw of lots. Local team seeding: Luck of the draw. Knock-out tournament type: Double match
Final	17 October 2014	30 May 2015	1	2 → 1	Single match, stadium TBD by RFEF. UEFA Europa League qualification: winners qualified for 2015–16 UEFA Europa League, group stage.

Notes

- Double-match rounds enforced away goals rule, single-match rounds did not.
- Games ending in a tie were decided in extra time; and if it persisted, by a penalty shoot-out.
- Real Madrid, as participant in the 2014 FIFA Club World Cup, played its Round of 32 games on 29 October 2014 and 3 December 2014.
- UEFA Europa League qualification: if the Cup winners had qualified for the 2014–15 UEFA Champions League, the Cup runner-up would have qualified for the third qualifying round, then the 5th and 6th ranked teams in 2014–15 La Liga (always excluding no "UEFA licence" and banned clubs) would qualify for group stage and play-off round respectively. However, if the Cup runners-up ended in Europa League places (5th or 6th), the 5th, 6th and 7th ranked teams in 2014–15 La Liga would have qualified for the group stage, play-off round and third qualifying round respectively.
  Similarly, if both finalists qualified for the 2015–16 UEFA Champions League, the 5th, 6th and 7th ranked teams in 2014–15 La Liga would also qualify for group stage, play-off round and third qualifying round respectively.
- At the date of the draw of the first and second round, Murcia was considered a team of Segunda División yet, and Mirandés of Segunda División B.

== Qualified teams ==
The following teams competed in the 2014–15 Copa del Rey.

Twenty teams of 2014–15 La Liga:

- Almería
- Athletic Bilbao
- Atlético Madrid
- Barcelona
- Celta Vigo
- Córdoba
- Deportivo La Coruña
- Eibar
- Elche
- Espanyol
- Getafe
- Granada
- Levante
- Málaga
- Rayo Vallecano
- Real Madrid
- Real Sociedad
- Sevilla
- Valencia
- Villarreal

Twenty teams of 2014–15 Segunda División (Barcelona B was excluded for being a reserve team and Racing Santander was sanctioned):

- Alavés
- Albacete
- Alcorcón
- Girona
- Jaén
- Las Palmas
- Leganés
- Llagostera
- Lugo
- Mallorca
- Murcia
- Numancia
- Osasuna
- Ponferradina
- Real Betis
- Sabadell
- Sporting Gijón
- Valladolid
- Tenerife
- Zaragoza

36 teams of 2014–15 Segunda División B: the top five teams of each of the 4 groups (excluding reserve teams), the five with the highest number of points out of the remaining non-reserve teams (*), the three teams relegated from 2013–14 Segunda División, and the twelve teams winners of a group of 2013–14 Tercera División (or at least the ones with the highest number of points within their group since reserve teams are excluded) that were promoted to Segunda División B.

- Alcoyano
- Amorebieta
- Atlético Astorga
- Atlético Baleares
- Avilés
- Barakaldo
- Cádiz
- Cartagena
- Cornellà
- Eldense
- Fuenlabrada
- Gimnàstic Tarragona
- Guadalajara
- Guijuelo
- Hércules
- Huesca
- Jaén
- La Hoya Lorca
- Lealtad
- Leioa
- L'Hospitalet
- Linense
- Lleida Esportiu
- Marbella
- Marino Luanco
- Mirandés
- Oviedo
- Racing de Ferrol
- San Roque de Lepe
- Sestao River
- Somozas
- Toledo
- Trival Valderas
- UCAM Murcia
- Villanovense
- Zamora

Seven teams of 2014–15 Tercera División. Teams that qualified were six of eighteen champions that were not promoted to Segunda División B (or at least the ones with the highest number of points within their group since reserve teams were excluded):

- Atlético Granadilla
- Gimnástica Torrelavega
- Izarra
- Peña Deportiva
- Puertollano
- Teruel
- Varea

== First round ==
The draw for First and Second round was held on 31 July 2014 at 13:00 CEST in La Ciudad del Fútbol, RFEF headquarters, in Las Rozas, Madrid. In this round 43 Segunda División B and Tercera División teams gained entry. In the draw, firstly seven teams from the 2014–15 Segunda División B (L'Hospitalet, Guadalajara, Fuenlabrada, Zamora, Lleida Esportiu, Mirandés and Guijuelo) received a bye and then remaining teams from 2014–15 Segunda División B and teams from 2014–15 Tercera División faced according to proximity criteria by next groups:

Pot 1 Group 1	Pot 2 Group 2	Pot 3 Group 3	Pot 4 Group 4
Segunda División B: Atlético Astorga; Avilés; Guijuelo; Lealtad; Marino Luanco; Oviedo; Mirandés; Racing de Ferrol; Somozas; Zamora Tercera División: Gimnástica Torrelavega; Varea	Segunda División B: Amorebieta; Barakaldo; Fuenlabrada; Guadalajara; Huesca; Leioa; Sestao River; Toledo; Trival Valderas Tercera División: Atlético Granadilla; Izarra; Puertollano; Teruel	Segunda División B: Alcoyano; Atlético Baleares; Cornellà; Eldense; Gimnàstic Tarragona; Hércules; L'Hospitalet; Lleida Tercera División: Peña Deportiva	Segunda División B: Balompédica Linense; Cádiz; Cartagena; Jaén; La Hoya Lorca; Marbella; San Roque de Lepe; UCAM Murcia; Villanovense

=== Matches ===
3 September	Somozas	3–0	Varea	As Somozas
18:00	Gómez 42'; Edi 72'; Luis Ángel 77' (o.g.)	Report		Stadium: Pardiñas; Referee: Domínguez Zapatero

3 September	Leioa	1–0	Sestao River	Leioa
19:30	Ander 64'	Report		Stadium: Sarriena; Attendance: 700; Referee: Cordero Vega

3 September	Izarra	1–0 (a.e.t.)	Atlético Granadilla	Estella-Lizarra
20:00	Cabrera 110'	Report		Stadium: Merkatondoa; Attendance: 230; Referee: Pardo Saavedra

3 September	Puertollano	0–3	Teruel	Puertollano
20:00			Samba 8'; Jael 27'; Monforte 87'	Stadium: Ciudad de Puertollano; Attendance: 400

3 September	Barakaldo	3–0	Trival Valderas	Barakaldo
20:15	Etxaniz 15', 55'; Aguiar 71'	Report		Stadium: Nuevo Lasesarre; Attendance: 300; Referee: Leo Ollo

3 September	Racing de Ferrol	5–1	Atlético Astorga	Ferrol
20:30	Thiago 5', 15'; Joselu 51'; Brais 62'; Dalmau 64'	Report	Víctor 67'	Stadium: A Malata; Referee: Fernández Pérez

3 September	Gimnástica de Torrelavega	1–2	Lealtad	Torrelavega
20:30	Platero 74'	Report	Villanueva 11'; Camporro 63'	Stadium: El Malecón; Attendance: 500; Referee: García Ballesteros

3 September	Avilés	0–0 (a.e.t.) (4–2 p)	Marino Luanco	Avilés
20:30		Report		Stadium: Suárez Puerta; Attendance: 1,000; Referee: Muñiz Ruiz
	Penalties
	López (penalty scored); Geni (penalty scored); Sampedro (penalty scored); Cristian (penalty scored)		Guaya (penalty missed); Omar (penalty scored); Dudi (penalty missed); Semedo (penalty scored)

3 September	Huesca	2–1 (a.e.t.)	Toledo	Huesca
20:30	Gassama 74'; Esnáider 111'	Report	García 79'	Stadium: El Alcoraz; Attendance: 1,000; Referee: Ávalos Martos

3 September	Gimnàstic de Tarragona	0–0 (a.e.t.) (5–3 p)	Atlético Baleares	Nou Estadi
20:30		Report		Stadium: Tarragona; Attendance: 2,476; Referee: Navarro Collados
	Penalties
	Azkorra (penalty scored); Verdú (penalty scored); Martínez (penalty scored); Cristóbal (penalty scored); Giner (penalty scored)		Nando (penalty scored); Esteban (penalty scored); Cifu (penalty missed); Bernat (penalty scored)

3 September	Alcoyano	1–1 (a.e.t.) (9–8 p)	Peña Deportiva	Alcoy
20:30	Francis 109'	Report	Ramiro 95'	Stadium: El Collao; Attendance: 1,500; Referee: Villena Contreras
	Penalties
	Rubio (penalty scored); Francis (penalty scored); Bello (penalty scored); Remón (penalty scored); Salvador (penalty missed); Alfaro (penalty scored); Mongil (penalty scored); López (penalty scored); Mario (penalty scored); Soler (penalty scored)		Pando (penalty scored); Ramiro (penalty missed); Paniello (penalty scored); Martínez (penalty scored); Piquero (penalty scored); Baena (penalty scored); Salas (penalty scored); Pomar (penalty scored); Vicent (penalty scored); Álex (penalty missed)

3 September	Oviedo	4–0	Amorebieta	Oviedo
20:30	García 16', 79'; Eneko 50'; Cervero 59'	Report		Stadium: Carlos Tartiere; Attendance: 7,751; Referee: Brea Peón

3 September	Cornellà	0–0 (a.e.t.) (4–3 p)	Jaén	Cornellà
20:30		Report		Stadium: Nou Camp; Attendance: 1,000; Referee: Escriche Guzmán
	Penalties
	Arnau (penalty scored); Boniquet (penalty scored); Xemi (penalty missed); Gómez (penalty scored); Muñoz (penalty scored)		Martos (penalty scored); Fede (penalty scored); Astrain (penalty scored); Cruz (penalty missed); Pedrito (penalty missed)

3 September	Hércules	2–2 (a.e.t.) (3–4 p)	Eldense	Alicante
21:00	Portillo 41'; Fernando 109'	Report	Higgins 57'; Jiménez 118'	Stadium: Rico Pérez
	Penalties
	Miñano (penalty missed); Martins (penalty missed); Acevedo (penalty scored); Pardo (penalty scored); Fernando (penalty scored)		Quini (penalty scored); Sánchez (penalty scored); Jiménez (penalty scored); Aridane (penalty missed); Chupe (penalty scored)

3 September	San Roque de Lepe	0–3	Cádiz	Lepe
21:00		Report	Villar 42'; García 69'; Sánchez 88'	Stadium: Ciudad de Lepe; Attendance: 1,000; Referee: Cadenas de Llano Delgado

3 September	Marbella	0–1	Linense	Marbella
21:00		Report	Olmo 89'	Stadium: Municipal; Attendance: 2,500; Referee: Alonso Portillo

3 September	Cartagena	0–1	UCAM Murcia	Cartagena
21:00		Report	Nono 89'	Stadium: Cartagonova; Attendance: 3,211; Referee: Sánchez Villalobos

3 September	La Hoya Lorca	2–2 (a.e.t.) (1–3 p)	Villanovense	Lorca
21:00	Franch 14'; Cuerva 74'	Report	Anxo 9'; Pajuelo 79'	Stadium: Artés Carrasco; Referee: García Aceña
	Penalties
	Ortiz (penalty missed); Pino (penalty missed); Castillo (penalty scored); Paredes (penalty missed)		Jair (penalty missed); Pantoja (penalty scored); Moraga (penalty scored); Álvaro (penalty scored)

== Second round ==
The draw was held together with the First round draw on 31 July 2014 in La Ciudad del Fútbol. In the draw, the team from 2014–15 Segunda División B or 2014–15 Tercera División, winner from First round match Oviedo v Amorebieta, received a bye. Teams from 2014–15 Segunda División gained entry in this round and faced each other. Winners of First round, together with the seven teams which received a bye, faced each other too.

9 September	Girona	0–0 (a.e.t.) (6–5 p)	Tenerife	Girona
20:00		Report		Stadium: Montilivi; Referee: José María Sánchez Martínez
	Penalties
	Jandro (penalty scored); Mata (penalty scored); Eloi Amagat (penalty scored); García (penalty missed); Gómez (penalty scored); Juanlu (penalty scored); Aday (penalty scored)		Ruiz (penalty scored); Dávila (penalty missed); Suso (penalty scored); Arnáez (penalty scored); Vitolo (penalty scored); Sanz (penalty scored); Álvarez (penalty missed)

9 September	Alavés	2–0 (a.e.t.)	Osasuna	Vitoria-Gasteiz
22:00	Sangalli 114'; Despotović 116'	Report		Stadium: Mendizorrotza; Attendance: 7,392; Referee: Arias López

10 September	Leioa	2–0	Teruel	Leioa
19:30	S. García 13'; Lander 21' (pen.)	Report		Stadium: Sarriena; Referee: Galech Apezteguía

10 September	Izarra	3–1 (a.e.t.)	Somozas	Estella-Lizarra
20:00	Álex Chico 79'; Palacios 111'; Araiz 118'	Report	Joseba Beitia 42' (o.g.)	Stadium: Merkatondoa; Referee: Rezola Etxeberria

10 September	Sporting de Gijón	1–3	Valladolid	Gijón
20:00	Jony 64'	Report	Timor 22'; Alfaro 58'; Samuel 73'	Stadium: El Molinón; Attendance: 9,200; Referee: Ricardo de Burgos Bengoetxea

10 September	Real Betis	2–0	Llagostera	Seville
20:00	Matilla 46'; Rennella 55'	Report		Stadium: Benito Villamarín; Attendance: 15,712; Referee: Sagués Oscoz

10 September	Albacete	1–0	Zaragoza	Albacete
20:00	Chumbi 44'	Report		Stadium: Carlos Belmonte; Attendance: 4,500; Referee: Ocón Arráiz

10 September	Alcoyano	1–0	Gimnàstic	Alcoy
20:30	Mario 68'	Report		Stadium: El Collao; Referee: Díaz Escudero

10 September	Avilés	0–1	Barakaldo	Avilés
20:30		Report	Izurza 35'	Stadium: Suárez Puerta; Attendance: 900; Referee: Iglesias Villanueva

10 September	UCAM Murcia	1–1 (a.e.t.) (3–2 p)	Eldense	Murcia
20:30	Javier Hernández 2'	Report	Jefté 23'	Stadium: La Condomina
	Penalties
	Chavero (penalty scored); Jairo (penalty missed); Domínguez (penalty scored); Pérez (penalty scored)		Sánchez (penalty scored); Juanjo (penalty missed); Jiménez (penalty scored); Vivancos (penalty missed); Paulinho (penalty missed)

10 September	Mirandés	4–1	Racing de Ferrol	Miranda de Ebro
20:45	Vera 21', 50', 78'; Martínez 83'	Report	Dalmau 75'	Stadium: Anduva; Attendance: 2,848; Referee: González Fuertes

10 September	Guijuelo	0–1	L'Hospitalet	Guijuelo
21:00		Report	Nano 8'	Stadium: Municipal; Attendance: 1,000; Referee: Fernández Fernández

10 September	Lleida Esportiu	3–0	Guadalajara	Lleida
21:00	Osado 4'; Salva Chamorro 54' (pen.); Eugeni 89'	Report		Stadium: Camp d'Esports; Attendance: 1,361; Referee: Ais Reig

10 September	Villanovense	2–2 (a.e.t.) (3–4 p)	Huesca	Villanueva de la Serena
21:00	Carlos David 72' (o.g.); Anxo 85'		David Morillas 87'; Camacho 90'	Stadium: Romero Cuerda; Attendance: 1,000
	Penalties
	Pantoja (penalty missed); Jairo (penalty scored); Jair (penalty missed); Moraga (penalty scored); Calatrava (penalty scored); Cubi (penalty missed)		Camacho (penalty scored); Guillem (penalty missed); Scardina (penalty scored); Carlos David (penalty missed); Gaspar (penalty scored); Ros (penalty scored)

10 September	Cádiz	2–1	Lealtad	Cádiz
21:00	Navarrete 4'; Airam 48'	Report	Rubio 89' (o.g.)	Stadium: Ramón de Carranza; Attendance: 8,000; Referee: Sánchez Laso

10 September	Linense	4–1	Fuenlabrada	La Línea de la Concepción
21:00	Juampe 2'; Copi 18'; José Ramón 88'; Montes 89'	Report	Borja 41'	Stadium: Municipal; Attendance: 1,600; Referee: Escudero Marín

10 September	Cornellà	3–2	Zamora	Cornellà
21:00	Gómez 11'; Gallar 59'; García 69'	Report	Arkaitz 30', 45'	Stadium: Nou Camp; Attendance: 1,000; Referee: Guillermo Cuadra Fernández

10 September	Recreativo	2–1	Ponferradina	Huelva
21:00	Molina 23'; Jiménez 42'	Report	Sobrino 2'	Stadium: Nuevo Colombino; Attendance: 1,587; Referee: Arcediano Monescillo

10 September	Murcia	1–2	Sabadell	Murcia
21:00	Jairo 30'	Report	Hernández 32'; Gato 62'	Stadium: Nueva Condomina; Attendance: 5,440; Referee: Piñeiro Crespo

10 September	Leganés	1–1 (a.e.t.) (1–4 p)	Numancia	Leganés
21:00	Álvarez 87'	Report	Rodríguez 70'	Stadium: Butarque; Attendance: 2,300; Referee: Trujillo Suárez
	Penalties
	Eraso (penalty missed); Aguirre (penalty missed); Álvaro (penalty scored)		Rodríguez (penalty scored); Juanma (penalty scored); Arias (penalty scored); Isidoro (penalty scored)

10 September	Mallorca	0–2	Las Palmas	Palma
22:00		Report	Guzmán 55'; Leo 90+2'	Stadium: Iberostar Estadi; Attendance: 3,728; Referee: Figueroa Vázquez

11 September	Lugo	1–0	Alcorcón	Lugo
21:00	Lolo 77'	Report		Stadium: Anxo Carro; Referee: Areces Franco

== Third round ==
The draw was held on 22 September 2013 at 13:00 CEST in La Ciudad del Fútbol. In the draw, as Mirandés was relocated to the pot with the teams of 2014–15 Segunda División, one team from this league received a bye. Teams from Segunda División faced each other and teams from 2014–15 Segunda División B and 2014–15 Tercera División faced each other.

Pot 1 Segunda División	Pot 2 Segunda División B and Tercera División
Segunda División: Alavés; Albacete; Girona; Las Palmas; Lugo; Mirandés; Numancia; Real Betis; Recreativo; Sabadell * Valladolid	Segunda División B: Alcoyano; Barakaldo; Cádiz; Cornellà; Huesca; Izarra; L'Hospitalet; Leioa; Linense; Lleida Esportiu; Oviedo; UCAM Murcia

=== Matches ===
14 October 2014	Mirandés	0–1	Alavés	Miranda de Ebro
20:00		Report	Barreiro 86'	Stadium: Estadio Municipal de Anduva; Attendance: 3,401; Referee: Lesma López

14 October 2014	Albacete	2–1	Recreativo	Albacete
22:00	Cidoncha 34'; Cruz 71'	Report	Menosse 85'	Stadium: Estadio Carlos Belmonte; Attendance: 1,500; Referee: Medié Jiménez

15 October 2014	L'Hospitalet	3–2	Izarra	L'Hospitalet de Llobregat
20:00	Nano 49'; Alcaraz 60'; Agustín 78'	Report	Pito Camacho 11', 20'	Stadium: Estadi La Feixa Llarga; Attendance: 300; Referee: Varón Aceitón

15 October 2014	Valladolid	2–0	Girona	Valladolid
20:00	Guille 56'; Samuel 79'	Report		Stadium: Estadio José Zorrilla; Attendance: 6,437; Referee: José Luis Munuera Montero

15 October 2014	Alcoyano	1–0	Lleida Esportiu	Alcoy
20:30	Vich 71'	Report		Stadium: Estadio El Collao; Attendance: 2,088; Referee: Lozano Reina

15 October 2014	Oviedo	1–0 (a.e.t.)	UCAM Murcia	Oviedo
20:30	Linares 96'	Report		Stadium: Estadio Carlos Tartiere; Attendance: 10,188; Referee: Villoria Linacero

15 October 2014	Huesca	2–1 (a.e.t.)	Barakaldo	Huesca
20:30	Guillem 86'; Ros 118'	Report	Vidal 44'	Stadium: Estadio El Alcoraz; Attendance: 3,515; Referee: Sauleda torrent

15 October 2014	Cornellà	2–1	Leioa	Cornellà
21:00	Muñoz 43'; Gallar 70'	Report	Ander 11'	Stadium: Nou Camp; Attendance: 1,500; Referee: Ripoll Solano

15 October 2014	Linense	1–2	Cádiz	La Línea de la Concepción
21:00	Copi 14'	Report	Kike 46'; Airam 75'	Stadium: Estadio Municipal; Attendance: 8,000; Referee: García Maqueda

15 October 2014	Real Betis	0–0 (a.e.t.) (5–4 p)	Lugo	Seville
22:00		Report		Stadium: Estadio Benito Villamarín; Attendance: 10,542; Referee: Pizarro Gómez
	Penalties
	Castro (penalty scored); Matilla (penalty scored); Kadir (penalty scored); Rennella (penalty scored); Cejudo (penalty scored)		Fernández (penalty scored); Aganzo (penalty scored); Lolo (penalty scored); García (penalty scored); López (penalty missed)

16 October 2014	Las Palmas	2–0	Numancia	Las Palmas de Gran Canaria
21:00	Guzmán 4'; Asdrúbal 82'	Report		Stadium: Estadio Gran Canaria; Attendance: 10,040; Referee: Sureda Cuenca

- Note: Sabadell received a bye.

== Final phase ==
The draw for the Round of 32 was held on October 17, 2014, in La Ciudad del Fútbol. In this round, all La Liga teams gained entry in the competition.

Round of 32 pairings were as follows: the six remaining teams participating in Segunda División B and Tercera División faced the La Liga teams which qualified for European competitions, this was: four teams from Pot 1 (Segunda B and Tercera) were drawn against four teams from pot 2a (champions) and the two remaining teams in pot 1 were drawn in the same way with the pot 2b teams (Europa League). The remaining team in pot 2b was drawn with a Segunda División team (Pot 3). The five remaining teams in this pot were drawn against five teams of the thirteen remaining teams of La Liga (Pot 4). The remaining eight teams of La Liga faced each other. Matches involving teams with different league tiers were played at home on the first leg the team in lower tier. This rule also applied in the Round of 16, but not for Quarter-finals and Semi-finals, in which order of the two legs was decided by the draw.

Pot 1 Segunda División B	Pot 2a Champions League	Pot 2b Europa League	Pot 3 Segunda División	Pot 4 Rest of Primera División
Segunda División B: L'Hospitalet; Alcoyano; Oviedo; Huesca; Cornellà; Cádiz	Barcelona; Real Madrid (TH); Atlético Madrid; Athletic Bilbao	Real Sociedad; Villarreal; Sevilla	Alavés; Albacete; Las Palmas; Real Betis; Sabadell; Valladolid	Almería; Celta Vigo; Córdoba; Deportivo La Coruña; Eibar; Elche; Espanyol; Getafe; Granada; Levante; Málaga; Rayo Vallecano; Valencia

=== Bracket ===
Round of 32; 2/3/4/5 December 2014; 16/17/18 December 2014
Deportivo La Coruña	1	1	2
Málaga	1	4	5
Albacete	1	0	1
Levante (a)	1	0	1
Las Palmas	2	1	3
Celta Vigo	1	3	4
Alcoyano	1	0	1
Athletic Bilbao	1	1	2
Rayo Vallecano	1	4	5
Valencia	2	4	6
Alavés	0	0	0
Espanyol	2	1	3
Granada	1	1	2
Córdoba	0	1	1
Sabadell	1	1	2
Sevilla	6	5	11
Huesca	0	1	1
Barcelona	4	8	12
Valladolid	0	0	0
Elche	0	1	1
L'Hospitalet	0	2	2
Atlético Madrid	3	2	5
Cornellà	1	0	1
Real Madrid	4	5	9
Cádiz	1	0	1
Villarreal	2	3	5
Oviedo	0	0	0
Real Sociedad	0	2	2
Real Betis	3	1	4
Almería	4	2	6
Getafe	3	2	5
Eibar	0	1	1

Round of 16; 7 January 2015; 14 January 2015
Málaga	2	2	4
Levante	0	3	3
Celta Vigo	2	2	4
Athletic Bilbao (a)	4	0	4
Valencia	2	0	2
Espanyol	1	2	3
Granada	1	0	1
Sevilla	2	4	6
Barcelona	5	4	9
Elche	0	0	0
Atlético Madrid	2	2	4
Real Madrid	0	2	2
Villarreal	1	2	3
Real Sociedad	0	2	2
Almería	1	0	1
Getafe	1	1	2

Quarter-finals; 21 January 2015; 28 January 2015
Málaga	0	0	0
Athletic Bilbao	0	1	1
Espanyol	3	0	3
Sevilla	1	1	2
Barcelona	1	3	4
Atlético Madrid	0	2	2
Villarreal	1	1	2
Getafe	0	0	0

Semi-finals; 11 February 2015; 4 March 2015
Athletic Bilbao	1	2	3
Espanyol	1	0	1
Barcelona	3	3	6
Villarreal	1	1	2

Final; 30 May 2015
Athletic Bilbao	1
Barcelona	3

== Round of 32 ==
=== First leg ===
29 October 2014	Cornellà	1–4	Real Madrid	Cornellà de Llobregat
20:00	Muñoz 20'	Report	Varane 10', 36'; Hernández 53'; Marcelo 75'	Stadium: Power8 Stadium; Attendance: 28,895; Referee: Santiago Jaime Latre

29 October 2014	Sabadell	1–6	Sevilla	Sabadell
22:00	Forgàs 75'	Report	Kolodziejczak 28'; Aspas 43', 60', 93' (pen.); Gameiro 67'; Reyes 70'	Stadium: Nova Creu Alta; Attendance: 6,157; Referee: Iñaki Vicandi Garrido

2 December 2014	Alcoyano	1–1	Athletic Bilbao	Alcoy
20:00	Francis 32'	Report	Viguera 90+1'	Stadium: El Collao; Attendance: 3,517; Referee: Eduardo Prieto Iglesias

2 December 2014	Alavés	0–2	Espanyol	Vitoria-Gasteiz
20:00		Report	Stuani 35', 90+3'	Stadium: Mendizorroza; Attendance: 7,313; Referee: Alberto Undiano Mallenco

2 December 2014	Las Palmas	2–1	Celta Vigo	Las Palmas
22:00	Hernán 23'; Silva 79'	Report	Mina 83' (pen.)	Stadium: Estadio Gran Canaria; Attendance: 10,679; Referee: Carlos Velasco Carballo

2 December 2014	Valladolid	0–0	Elche	Valladolid
22:00		Report		Stadium: José Zorrilla; Attendance: 4,687; Referee: Pedro Pérez Montero

3 December 2014	L'Hospitalet	0–3	Atlético Madrid	L'Hospitalet de Llobregat
20:00		Report	Griezmann 65'; Gabi 81' (pen.); Rodríguez 90+2'	Stadium: La Feixa Llarga; Attendance: 2,500; Referee: David Fernández Borbalán

3 December 2014	Deportivo La Coruña	1–1	Málaga	A Coruña
20:00	Toché 68'	Report	Camacho 11'	Stadium: Riazor; Attendance: 9,988; Referee: Antonio Mateu Lahoz

3 December 2014	Granada	1–0	Córdoba	Granada
22:00	Córdoba 25'	Report		Stadium: Los Cármenes; Attendance: 9,066; Referee: Fernando Teixeira Vitienes

3 December 2014	Huesca	0–4	Barcelona	Huesca
22:00		Report	Rakitić 12'; Iniesta 16'; Pedro 39'; Rafinha 72'	Stadium: El Alcoraz; Attendance: 10,000

4 December 2014	Cádiz	1–2	Villarreal	Cádiz
20:00	Arregi 47'	Report	Gerard 17'; Matías Nahuel 21'	Stadium: Ramón de Carranza; Attendance: 12,000; Referee: Ignacio Iglesias Villanueva

4 December 2014	Oviedo	0–0	Real Sociedad	Oviedo
20:00		Report		Stadium: Carlos Tartiere; Attendance: 9,028; Referee: Teixeira Vitienes

4 December 2014	Rayo Vallecano	1–2	Valencia	Madrid
22:00	Moreno 36'	Report	Alcácer 25'; De Paul 85'	Stadium: Vallecas; Attendance: 8,551; Referee: Mario Melero López

5 December 2014	Albacete	1–1	Levante	Albacete
20:00	Moutinho 6'	Report	El Adoua 69'	Stadium: Carlos Belmonte; Attendance: 4,813; Referee: Xavier Estrada Fernández

5 December 2014	Getafe	3–0	Eibar	Getafe
20:00	Sarabia 63', 74'; Vázquez 70'	Report		Stadium: Coliseum Alfonso Pérez; Attendance: 1,700; Referee: Alejandro Hernández Hernández

5 December 2014	Real Betis	3–4	Almería	Seville
22:00	Castro 80'; Perquis 86'; Molina 90'	Report	Mané 3'; Teerasil 5'; Quique 29'; Édgar 61'	Stadium: Benito Villamarín; Attendance: 3,000; Referee: Juan Martínez Munuera

=== Second leg ===
2 December 2014	Real Madrid	5–0 (9–1 agg.)	Cornellà	Madrid
20:00	Rodríguez 16', 34'; Isco 31'; López 60' (o.g.); Jesé 77'	Report		Stadium: Santiago Bernabéu; Attendance: 50,862; Referee: José González González

3 December 2014	Sevilla	5–1 (11–2 agg.)	Sabadell	Seville
20:00	Gameiro 35'; Aspas 58', 59', 62'; Deulofeu 80'	Report	Collantes 22' (pen.)	Stadium: Ramón Sánchez Pizjuán; Attendance: 14,473; Referee: Jesús Gil Manzano

16 December 2014	Celta Vigo	3–1 (4–3 agg.)	Las Palmas	Vigo
20:00	Larrivey 19'; Mina 50'; Orellana 90+2'	Report	Nauzet 53'	Stadium: Balaídos; Attendance: 11,320; Referee: Fernando Teixeira Vitienes

16 December 2014	Valencia	4–4 (6–5 agg.)	Rayo Vallecano	Valencia
20:00	Alcácer 7', 65'; Morcillo 46' (o.g.); Rodrigo 71'	Report	Jozabed 20'; Pozuelo 23'; Pereira 38'; Embarba 61'	Stadium: Mestalla; Attendance: 23,600; Referee: Santiago Jaime Latre

16 December 2014	Almería	2–1 (6–4 agg.)	Real Betis	Almería
20:00	Michel 59'; Zongo 74'	Report	Perquis 78'	Stadium: Juegos Mediterráneos; Attendance: 4,133; Referee: Carlos Velasco Carballo

16 December 2014	Barcelona	8–1 (12–1 agg.)	Huesca	Barcelona
22:00	Pedro 20', 26', 43'; Roberto 29'; Iniesta 40'; Adriano 68'; Traoré 78'; Sandro 83'	Report	Carlos David 86'	Stadium: Camp Nou; Attendance: 44,884; Referee: Eduardo Prieto Iglesias

17 December 2014	Espanyol	1–0 (3–0 agg.)	Alavés	Cornellà de Llobregat
20:00	Jairo 65'	Report		Stadium: Cornellà-El Prat; Attendance: 5,118; Referee: Alejandro Hernández Hernández

17 December 2014	Levante	0–0 (1–1 agg.)	Albacete	Valencia
20:00		Report		Stadium: Ciutat de València; Attendance: 6,000; Referee: Ignacio Iglesias Villanueva

17 December 2014	Eibar	1–2 (1–5 agg.)	Getafe	Eibar
20:00	Piovaccari 55'	Report	Vigaray 19'; Castro 33'	Stadium: Ipurua; Attendance: 2,599; Referee: Teixeira Vitienes

17 December 2014	Villarreal	3–0 (5–1 agg.)	Cádiz	Villarreal
22:00	Trigueros 55' (pen.); Gerard 78', 88'	Report		Stadium: El Madrigal; Attendance: 7,972; Referee: Iñaki Vicandi Garrido

17 December 2014	Real Sociedad	2–0 (2–0 agg.)	Oviedo	San Sebastián
22:00	Finnbogason 27', 61'	Report		Stadium: Anoeta; Attendance: 9,265; Referee: Alberto Undiano Mallenco

17 December 2014	Córdoba	1–1 (1–2 agg.)	Granada	Córdoba
22:00	Andone 5'	Report	Mainz 60'	Stadium: Nuevo Arcángel; Attendance: 6,000; Referee: Alfonso Álvarez Izquierdo

18 December 2014	Atlético Madrid	2–2 (5–2 agg.)	L'Hospitalet	Madrid
20:00	Mandžukić 19', 74'	Report	Alcaraz 67', 84'	Stadium: Vicente Calderón; Attendance: 4,000; Referee: Mario Melero López

18 December 2014	Elche	1–0 (1–0 agg.)	Valladolid	Elche
20:00	Adrián 7'	Report		Stadium: Manuel Martínez Valero; Attendance: 9,022; Referee: Xavier Estrada Fernández

18 December 2014	Athletic Bilbao	1–0 (2–1 agg.)	Alcoyano	Bilbao
22:00	Viguera 39'	Report		Stadium: San Mamés; Attendance: 20,000; Referee: Carlos del Cerro Grande

18 December 2014	Málaga	4–1 (5–2 agg.)	Deportivo La Coruña	Málaga
22:00	Santa Cruz 51', 68'; Recio 59'; Camacho 90+3'	Report	Postiga 57'	Stadium: La Rosaleda; Attendance: 23,000; Referee: Juan Martínez Munuera

== Round of 16 ==
=== First leg ===
6 January 2015	Celta Vigo	2–4	Athletic Bilbao	Vigo
17:00	López 11'; Charles 54'	Report	San José 5'; Aduriz 15', 87' (pen.); Susaeta 61'	Stadium: Balaídos; Attendance: 14,929; Referee: Pedro Pérez Montero

6 January 2015	Málaga	2–0	Levante	Málaga
19:00	Juanpi 16'; Horta 78'	Report		Stadium: La Rosaleda; Attendance: 12,000; Referee: Alejandro Hernández Hernández

7 January 2015	Villarreal	1–0	Real Sociedad	Villarreal
20:00	Cheryshev 71'	Report		Stadium: El Madrigal; Attendance: 10,800; Referee: Jesús Gil Manzano

7 January 2015	Atlético Madrid	2–0	Real Madrid	Madrid
21:00	García 58' (pen.); Giménez 77'	Report		Stadium: Vicente Calderón; Attendance: 51,000; Referee: Carlos Clos Gómez

7 January 2015	Valencia	2–1	Espanyol	Valencia
22:00	Gayà 11'; Negredo 86' (pen.)	Report	Stuani 60'	Stadium: Mestalla; Attendance: 35,000; Referee: Alberto Undiano Mallenco

7 January 2015	Almería	1–1	Getafe	Almería
22:00	Verza 59' (pen.)	Report	Verza 21' (o.g.)	Stadium: Juegos Mediterráneos; Attendance: 3,196; Referee: José Luis González González

8 January 2015	Granada	1–2	Sevilla	Granada
20:00	Bangoura 90+3'	Report	Deulofeu 31'; Gameiro 53'	Stadium: Los Cármenes; Attendance: 11,701; Referee: Antonio Mateu Lahoz

8 January 2015	Barcelona	5–0	Elche	Barcelona
22:00	Neymar 35', 60'; Suárez 40'; Messi 46' (pen.); Alba 56'	Report		Stadium: Camp Nou; Attendance: 27,099; Referee: David Fernández Borbalán

=== Second leg ===
13 January 2015	Espanyol	2–0 (3–2 agg.)	Valencia	Cornellà de Llobregat
20:00	Caicedo 79', 89'	Report		Stadium: Power8 Stadium; Attendance: 16,950; Referee: Ignacio Iglesias Villanueva

13 January 2015	Levante	3–2 (3–4 agg.)	Málaga	Valencia
22:00	Barral 71', 74'; Juanfran 85'	Report	Horta 22'; Recio 38'	Stadium: Ciutat de València; Attendance: 4,000; Referee: José Luis González González

14 January 2015	Real Sociedad	2–2 (2–3 agg.)	Villarreal	San Sebastián
20:00	Vela 45'; Granero 74'	Report	Gerard 27'; G. dos Santos 73'	Stadium: Anoeta; Attendance: 17,066; Referee: Carlos Velasco Carballo

14 January 2015	Athletic Bilbao	0–2 (4–4 agg.)	Celta Vigo	Bilbao
20:00		Report	Etxeita 50' (o.g.); Orellana 61'	Stadium: San Mamés; Attendance: 25,000; Referee: Juan Martínez Munuera

14 January 2015	Getafe	1–0 (2–1 agg.)	Almería	Getafe
20:00	Vázquez 76'	Report		Stadium: Coliseum Alfonso Pérez; Attendance: 3,000; Referee: Alfonso Álvarez Izquierdo

14 January 2015	Sevilla	4–0 (6–1 agg.)	Granada	Seville
22:00	Gameiro 18', 55'; Aspas 27'; Suárez 64'	Report		Stadium: Ramón Sánchez Pizjuán; Attendance: 14,104; Referee: Carlos Clos Gómez

15 January 2015	Real Madrid	2–2 (2–4 agg.)	Atlético Madrid	Madrid
20:00	Ramos 20'; Ronaldo 54'	Report	Torres 1', 46'	Stadium: Santiago Bernabéu; Attendance: 84,500; Referee: Antonio Mateu Lahoz

15 January 2015	Elche	0–4 (0–9 agg.)	Barcelona	Elche
22:00		Report	Mathieu 21'; Roberto 40'; Pedro 43' (pen.); Adriano 90+2'	Stadium: Martínez Valero; Attendance: 13,446; Referee: Santiago Jaime Latre

== Quarter-finals ==
=== First leg ===
21 January 2015	Villarreal	1–0	Getafe	Villarreal
20:00	Bruno 85'	Report		Stadium: El Madrigal; Attendance: 14,000; Referee: Alejandro Hernández Hernández

21 January 2015	Málaga	0–0	Athletic Bilbao	Málaga
22:00		Report		Stadium: La Rosaleda; Attendance: 22,000; Referee: Eduardo Prieto Iglesias

21 January 2015	Barcelona	1–0	Atlético Madrid	Barcelona
22:00	Messi 85'	Report		Stadium: Camp Nou; Attendance: 62,225; Referee: José González González

22 January 2015	Espanyol	3–1	Sevilla	Cornellà de Llobregat
22:00	Caicedo 18'; García 74' (pen.); Vázquez 81'	Report	Bacca 90+1'	Stadium: Power8 Stadium; Attendance: 14,838; Referee: Jesús Gil Manzano

=== Second leg ===
28 January 2015	Atlético Madrid	2–3 (2–4 agg.)	Barcelona	Madrid
21:00	Torres 1'; García 30' (pen.)	Report	Neymar 9', 41'; Miranda 38' (o.g.)	Stadium: Vicente Calderón; Attendance: 54,851; Referee: Jesús Gil Manzano

29 January 2015	Getafe	0–1 (0–2 agg.)	Villarreal	Madrid
20:00		Report	Gerard 79'	Stadium: Coliseum Alfonso Pérez; Attendance: 9,000; Referee: Fernando Teixeira Vitienes

29 January 2015	Athletic Bilbao	1–0 (1–0 agg.)	Málaga	Bilbao
22:00	Aduriz 48'	Report		Stadium: San Mamés; Attendance: 36,000; Referee: Carlos Velasco Carballo

29 January 2015	Sevilla	1–0 (2–3 agg.)	Espanyol	Seville
22:00	Figueiras 88'	Report		Stadium: Ramón Sánchez Pizjuán; Attendance: 39,055; Referee: Juan Martínez Munuera

== Semi-finals ==
=== First leg ===
11 February 2015	Barcelona	3–1	Villarreal	Barcelona
20:00	Messi 41'; Iniesta 49'; Piqué 64'	Report	Trigueros 48'	Stadium: Camp Nou; Attendance: 57,378; Referee: Alejandro Hernández Hernández

11 February 2015	Athletic Bilbao	1–1	Espanyol	Bilbao
22:00	Aduriz 11'	Report	Sánchez 35'	Stadium: San Mamés; Attendance: 26,000; Referee: Carlos del Cerro Grande

=== Second leg ===
4 March 2015	Villarreal	1–3 (2–6 agg.)	Barcelona	Villarreal
20:00	J. Dos Santos 39'	Report	Neymar 3', 88'; Suárez 73'	Stadium: El Madrigal; Attendance: 23,500; Referee: David Fernández Borbalán

4 March 2015	Espanyol	0–2 (1–3 agg.)	Athletic Bilbao	Cornellà de Llobregat
22:00		Report	Aduriz 12'; Etxeita 41'	Stadium: Power8 Stadium; Attendance: 34,831; Referee: Juan Martínez Munuera

== Final ==
30 May 2015
21:30 CEST

Athletic Bilbao	1–3	Barcelona
Williams 79'	Report	Messi 20', 74'; Neymar 36'

Camp Nou, Barcelona
Attendance: 99,354
Referee: Carlos Velasco Carballo

== Top goalscorers ==
Rank	Player	Club	Goals
1	(Brazil) Neymar	Barcelona	7
1	(Spain) Iago Aspas	Sevilla	7
3	(Spain) Aritz Aduriz	Athletic Bilbao	5
3	(France) Kevin Gameiro	Sevilla	5
3	(Argentina) Lionel Messi	Barcelona	5
3	(Spain) Gerard Moreno	Villarreal	5
3	(Spain) Pedro	Barcelona	5
8	(Spain) Paco Alcácer	Valencia	3
8	(Spain) Rubén Alcaraz	L'Hospitalet	3
8	(Ecuador) Felipe Caicedo	Espanyol	3
8	(Spain) Andrés Iniesta	Barcelona	3
8	(Uruguay) Cristhian Stuani	Espanyol	3
8	(Spain) Fernando Torres	Atlético Madrid	3
8	(Spain) Urko Vera	Mirandés	3
