= 2017–18 FC Barcelona B season =

Barcelona B
2017–18 season
- President: Josep Maria Bartomeu
- Manager: Gerard López (Until 25 April); Xavi García Pimienta
- Stadium: Mini Estadi
- Segunda División: 20th (relegated)
- Copa Catalunya: Second Round
- Top goalscorer: League: Carles Aleñá (11 goals); All: Carles Aleñá (11 goals)
- Highest home attendance: 5,592 vs Osasuna (25 March 2018)
- Lowest home attendance: 1,327 vs Albacete (19 December 2017)
Home colours	Away colours

The 2017–18 season was FC Barcelona B's 48th season in existence, the 23rd in Segunda División and first season, since promotion from Segunda División B, in the second flight of Spanish football.

== Players ==
N	Pos.	Nat.	Name	Age	EU	Since	App	Goals	Ends	Transfer fee	Notes
1	GK	(Spain)	Ezkieta	21	EU	2015	1	0	2019	Free	
2	RB	(Spain)	Morer	20	EU	2017	5	0	2019	YS	Promoted this season
3	LB	(Spain)	Cucurella	19	EU	2017	35	1	2019	YS	Promoted this season
4	CB	(Spain)	José Martínez	25	EU	2016	22	0	2018	Free	
5	CB	(Spain)	Tarín (vice-captain)	21	EU	2015	8	0	2018	YS	
7	DM	(Spain)	Cristian Rivera	20	EU	2018	17	0	2018	Loan	On loan from Eibar.
8	DM	(Spain)	Sarsanedas	21	EU	2016	12	0	2019	YS	
9	CF	(Spain)	Nahuel	21	EU	2018	16	5	2018	Loan	On loan from Villarreal
10	CM	(Spain)	Aleñá	20	EU	2016	36	11	2020	YS	
11	CF	(Spain)	Cardona	22	EU	2016	27	7	2018	Free	
12	CB	(Cameroon)	Hongla	20	EU	2018	6	0	2018	Loan	On loan from Granada
13	GK	(Spain)	Ortolá	24	EU	2013	29	0	2020	Free	
14	RB	(Spain)	Palencia (captain)	22	EU	2015	29	0	2018	€800Th	
15	RW	(Canada)	Ballou Tabla	19	Non-EU	2018	11	1	2019	Undisclosed	Bought from Montreal Impact
16	LW	(Spain)	Arnaiz	23	EU	2017	21	6	2021	€3.4Mil	
17	CM	(Spain)	Ruiz de Galarreta	24	EU	2017	25	1	2019	€700Th	
19	RW	(Spain)	Carles Pérez	20	EU	2017	25	3	2019	YS	Promoted this season
20	AM	(Brazil)	Vitinho	20	Non-EU	2017	24	1	2018	Loan	First season on loan from Palmeiras
21	CB	(Spain)	Costas	23	EU	2017	35	0	2018	Loan	First season on loan from Celta
22	DM	(England)	Marcus McGuane	19	EU	2018	8	0	2020	Undisclosed	
24	LB	(Spain)	Araújo	22	EU	2017	0	0	2018	Loan	First season on loan from Celta
25	GK	(Spain)	Varo	25	EU	2016	10	0	2018	Loan	Second season on loan from Nàstic.
26	CF	(Spain)	Abel Ruiz	18	EU	2017	25	3	2019	YS	Promoted this season
27	DM	(Spain)	Oriol Busquets	19	EU	2017	22	0	2018	YS	Promoted this season
28	CB	(Spain)	Cuenca	18	EU	2017	23	0	2019	€400Th	
33	LB	(Spain)	Juan Miranda	18	EU	2017	7	0	2019	YS	

- Last updated: 22 May 2018
- Source: FCBarcelona.com, Players In / Out, Wikipedia players' articles.

=== Promoted from Juvenil A ===
N	Pos.	Nat.	Name	Age	Notes
3	LB	(Spain)	Marc Cucurella	19	Signed a two year contract
—	GK	(Spain)	Sergi Puig	19	Signed a two year contract
—	LW	(Spain)	Sergio Gómez	17	

=== Players In ===
No.	Pos.	Nat.	Name	Age	EU	Moving from	Type	Transfer window	Ends	Transfer fee	Source
13	GK	(Spain)	Ortolá	24	EU	(Spain) Alavés	Loan return	Summer	2020	Free	FCBarcelona.com
—	FW	(Spain)	Cámara	24	EU	(Spain) Girona	Loan return	Summer	2017	Free	gironafc.cat
—	DF	(Spain)	Quintillà	21	EU	(Spain) Lleida Esportiu	Loan return	Summer	2018	Free	
1	GK	(Spain)	Ezkieta	21	EU	(Spain) Sabadell	Loan return	Summer	2019	Free	
—	DF	(Spain)	Franquesa	21	EU	(Spain) Gavà	Loan return	Summer	2018	Free	Second loan in 2016–17 season
—	DF	(Spain)	Gafarot	23	EU	(Spain) Cornellà	Loan return	Summer	2017	Free	
20	AM	(Brazil)	Vitinho	19	Non-EU	(Brazil) Palmeiras	Loan	Summer	2018	Loan	FCBarcelona.com
9	ST	(Honduras)	Anthony Lozano	24	EU	(Honduras) Olimpia	Signed	Summer	2019	Signed	Sport English
15	RW	(Canada)	Ballou Tabla	18	Non-EU	(Canada) Montreal Impact	Signed	Winter	2018	Signed	MLSsoccer.com
22	DM	(England)	McGuane	18	EU	(England) Arsenal	Signed	Winter	2023	Signed	FCBarcelona.com
9	MF	(Spain)	Nahuel	21	EU	(Spain) Villarreal	Loan	Winter	2018	Loan	FCBarcelona.com

Total expenditure: €0

=== Players Out ===
No.	Pos.	Nat.	Name	Age	EU	Moving to	Type	Transfer window	Transfer fee	Source
	GK	(Spain)	José Suárez	22	EU	(Spain) Girona	End of contract	Summer	N/A	
	CB	(Spain)	Borja López	24	EU	(Croatia) Hajduk Split	Contract terminated	Summer	N/A	hajduk.hr
	MF	(Spain)	Xemi	23	EU	(England) Oxford United	End of contract	Summer	N/A	
	MF	(Spain)	Gumbau	23	EU	(Spain) Leganés	End of contract	Summer	N/A	
	FW	(Spain)	Perea	28	EU	(Spain) Cádiz	End of contract	Summer	N/A	
	FW	(Spain)	Cámara	24	EU	(Spain) Reus	Loan	Summer	N/A	
	DF	(Spain)	Franquesa	21	EU	(Spain) Villarreal B	Contract terminated	Summer	N/A	
	DF	(Spain)	Gafarot	23	EU	(Spain) Cornellà	Loan	Summer	N/A	
	DF	(Spain)	Nili	24	EU	(Spain) Albacete	End of contract	Summer	N/A	
	LW	(Spain)	Abeledo	22	EU	(Spain) Atlético Malagueño	End of contract	Summer	N/A	
	GK	(Spain)	Sergi Puig	19	EU	(Spain) L'Hospitalet	Loan	Summer	N/A	
	LB	(Spain)	Quintillà	21	EU	(Spain) Villarreal B	End of contract	Summer	N/A	
	LW	(Spain)	Sergio Gómez	17	EU	(Germany) Borussia Dortmund	Transfer	Winter	€3.0m	Bundesliga
	ST	(Honduras)	Anthony Lozano	25	EU	(Spain) Girona	Transfer	Winter	N/A	FCBarcelona.com

Total income: ▲€3 million

Balance

Total:▲€3 million

== Technical staff ==
Position	Staff
Head coach	Xavi Garcia Pimienta
Assistant coach	Alberto Encinas
Assistant coach	Felip Ortiz
Fitness coach	Ismael Camenforte
Goalkeeping coach	Carles Busquets
Technical assistant	Javi Molina
Barcelona Juvenil A coach	Gabri García

Last updated: 25 May 2018
Source: FC Barcelona B Team

== Statistics ==
=== Squad statistics ===
	League	Cup	Total Stats
Games played	40	2	42
Games won	10	1	11
Games drawn	13	0	13
Games lost	17	1	18
Goals scored	46	3	49
Goals conceded	52	2	54
Goal difference	−6	1	−5
Clean sheets	5	1	6
Goal by Substitute	–	–	–
Total shots	345	–	345
Shots on target	139	–	139
Corners	–	–	–
Players used	–	–	–
Offsides	52	–	52
Fouls suffered	610	–	610
Fouls committed	495	–	495
Yellow cards	91	2	93
Red cards	1	1	2

Last updated: 23 May 2018

Players Used: Barcelona B has used a total of 20 different players in all competitions.

=== Goalscorers ===
No.	Pos.	Nation	Name	Segunda División	Copa Catalunya	Total
10	CM	(Spain)	Carles Aleñá	11	0	11
11	CF	(Spain)	Marc Cardona	7	2	9
16	LW	(Spain)	José Arnaiz	6	0	6
9	CF	(Honduras)	Lozano	4	0	4
26	CF	(Spain)	Abel Ruiz	3	0	3
20	AM	(Brazil)	Vitinho	1	1	2
17	CM	(Spain)	Ruiz de Galarreta	1	0	1
	RW	(Spain)	Concha	1	0	1
3	LB	(Spain)	Marc Cucurella	1	0	1
15	RW	(Canada)	Ballou Tabla	1	0	1
33	LB	(Spain)	Juan Miranda	1	0	1
	CM	(Spain)	Monchu	1	0	1
TOTAL				34	3	37

Last updated: 25 May 2018

=== Hat-tricks ===
Player	Against	Result	Date	Competition

(H) – Home; (A) – Away

=== Clean sheets ===
As of 22 November 2017.

Rank	Name	Segunda División	Copa Catalunya	Total	Played Games
1	(Spain) Ortolá	2	0	2	9
2	(Spain) Varo	1	1	2	7
2	(Spain) Ezkieta	0	0	0	1
Total		3	1	4	17

=== Disciplinary record ===
Includes all competitive matches. Players listed below made at least one appearance for Barcelona B first squad during the season.

N	P	Nat.	Name	Segunda División			Copa Catalunya			Total			Notes
N	P	Nat.	Name	Yellow card	Second yellow card	Red card	Yellow card	Second yellow card	Red card	Yellow card	Second yellow card	Red card	Notes
6	CB	(Spain)	Fali	2			1			3			
9	CF	(Honduras)	Lozano	1						1			
11	CF	(Spain)	Cardona	1			1			2			
14	RB	(Spain)	Palencia						1			1	
17	CM	(Spain)	Ruiz de Galarreta	2						2			
20	AM	(Brazil)	Vitinho	1						1			
27	DM	(Spain)	Oriol Busquets	1						1			

Last updated: 2 October 2017
Only competitive matches
(yellow card) = Number of bookings; (second yellow card) = Number of sending offs after a second yellow card; (red card) = Number of sending offs by a direct red card.

=== Injury record ===
N	P	Nat.	Name	Type	Status	Source	Match	Inj. Date	Ret. Date
	DF	(Spain)	Rodrigo Tarín	Knee Injury (torn ACL in right knee)		MundoDeportivo.com	vs Eldense	6 November 2016	June 2017
	FW	(Spain)	Rafa Mújica	Thigh Injury (torn tendon in right thigh)		FCB.es	vs Cornellà	18 February 2017	September 2017
	MF	(Cameroon)	Wilfrid Kaptoum	Knee Injury (torn meniscus in left knee)		sport.es	in training	19 June 2017	October 2017
	FW	(Spain)	Jesús Alfaro	Ankle Injury (sprained ligament in right ankle)		FCB.es	in training	21 July 2017	Late August 2017
	DF	(Spain)	Marc Cucurella	Thigh Injury (injured Adductor longus muscle in right thigh)		FCB.es	vs Lleida	11 August 2017	Early September 2017
	GK	(Spain)	Adrián Ortolá	Hand Injury (fractured Fifth metacarpal bone in right hand)		FCB.es	in training	13 August 2017	
	DF	(Spain)	Sergi Palencia	Ankle Injury (sprained ligament in left ankle)		FCB.es	in training	14 August 2017	Mid September 2017

- Player is injured
- Player has recovered from injury
Last updated: 15 August 2017

== Pre-season and friendlies ==
Win Draw Loss

25 July 2017 Friendly	L'Escala	0–7	Barcelona B	L'Escala, Catalonia
20:00 CEST		Report	Cardona 11', 18' (pen.), 32'; Vitinho 48'; Busquets 51', 70'; Paik 65'	Stadium: Nou Camp Municipal de L'Escala

29 July 2017 Friendly	Peralada	2–1	Barcelona B	Peralada, Catalonia
19:30 CEST	Clotet 58', 88'	Report	Lozano 8'	Stadium: Municipal de Peralada

4 August 2017 Friendly	Barcelona B	2–2	Girona	Barcelona, Catalonia
20:00 CEST	Vitinho 11'; Pérez 29'	Report	Soni 35'; Andzouana 60'	Stadium: Ciutat Esportiva Joan Gamper; Referee: Daniel López Jiménez

11 August 2017 Friendly	Barcelona B	1–0	Lleida	Barcelona, Catalonia
20:00 CEST	Cardona 51'	Report		Stadium: Mini Estadi

== Competitions ==
=== Copa Catalunya ===
30 July 2017 First Round	Santboià	0–2	Barcelona B	Sant Boi de Llobregat, Catalonia
19:00 CEST	Ruben Cruz (yellow card) 40'	fcb.com fcf.cat	Cardona 57', 84'	Stadium: Municipal Joan Baptista Milà; Referee: Óscar Carballo Vázquez

5 August 2017 Second Round	Terrassa	2–1	Barcelona B	Terrassa, Catalonia
20:30 CEST	Toro (yellow card) 43' (goal) 70'; Raúl Torres (yellow card) 55'; Daisuke 75'; Francesc Piera (yellow card) 77'; Álex Fernández (yellow card) 86'	fcf.cat	Cardona (yellow card) 31'; Fali (yellow card) 40'; Vitinho 65'; Palencia (red card) 89'	Stadium: Olimpic de Terrassa

=== Segunda División ===
==== League table ====
Pos	Team	Pld	W	D	L	GF	GA	GD	Pts	Promotion, qualification or relegation
18	Almería	42	12	12	18	38	45	−7	48 (Note: Almería finished ahead of Cultural Leonesa on head-to head points: Cultural Leonesa 0–0 Almería, Almería 2–1 Cultural Leonesa)	
19	Cultural Leonesa (R)	42	11	15	16	54	67	−13	48	Relegation to Segunda División B
20	Barcelona B (R)	42	10	14	18	46	54	−8	44	Relegation to Segunda División B
21	Lorca FC (Note: Lorca were administratively relegated to the Tercera División due to financial difficulties.) (R)	42	8	9	25	37	68	−31	33	Demotion to Tercera División
22	Sevilla Atlético (R)	42	7	11	24	29	60	−31	32	Relegation to Segunda División B

Source: La Liga
Rules for classification: 1) points; 2) head-to-head points; 3) head-to-head goal difference; 4) goal difference; 5) number of goals scored
(R) Relegated

==== Results summary ====
Overall								Home						Away					
Pld	W	D	L	GF	GA	GD	Pts	W	D	L	GF	GA	GD	W	D	L	GF	GA	GD
10	3	4	3	14	13	+1	13	2	1	2	7	6	+1	1	3	1	7	7	0

Last updated: 20 October 2017.
Source: Competitive matches

==== Results by round ====
Round	1	2	3	4	5	6	7	8	9	10	11	12	13	14	15	16	17	18	19	20	21	22	23	24	25	26	27	28	29	30	31	32	33	34	35	36	37	38	39	40	41	42
Ground	A	H	A	H	A	H	A	H	A	H	A	H	A	H	A	H	A	H	A	H	A	H	A	H	A	H	A	H	A	H	A	H	A	H	A	H	A	H	A	H	A	H
Result	W	L	D	W	D	L	D	D	L	W	D	D	D	L	L																											
Position	4	12	14	5	9	13	16	15	16	13	14	12	13	14	18																											

Updated to match(es) played on 22 November 2017. Source:
A = Away; H = Home; W = Win; D = Draw; L = Loss

==== Matches ====
19 August 2017 1	Real Valladolid	1–2	Barcelona B	Valladolid
21:00 CEST	Salvador 52'; Nacho (yellow card) 60'; Antoñito (yellow card) 70'; Luismi (yellow card) 75'; Deivid (yellow card) 77'	Report	Lozano 28'; Cardona 38'; Ruiz de Galarreta (yellow card) 42'	Stadium: Nuevo José Zorila; Attendance: 7,115; Referee: Juan Luis Pulido Santana (Gran Canaria)

28 August 2017 2	Barcelona B	0–3	Tenerife	Barcelona
21:00 CEST	Fali (yellow card) 38'; Vitinho (yellow card) 74'	Report	Juan Carlos 29'; Vitolo (yellow card) 33'; Suso 39'; Longo 69'	Stadium: Mini Estadi; Attendance: 2,283; Referee: Saúl Ais Reig (Valencia)

1 September 2017 3	Granada	2–2	Barcelona B	Granada
21:30 CEST	Joselu 25'; Pedro 52'; Menosse (yellow card) 59'; Rey Manaj (yellow card) 90'	Report	Ruiz de Galarreta 45'; Abel Ruiz 59'; Fali (yellow card) 90+4'	Stadium: Nuevo Los Cármenes; Attendance: 11,467; Referee: Dámaso Arcediano Monescillo (Castilla-La Mancha)

9 September 2017 4	Barcelona B	4–0	Córdoba	Barcelona
18:00 CEST	Aleñá 21'; Arnaiz 27', 38'; Lozano 66'; Ruiz de Galarreta (yellow card) 68'; Oriol Busquets (yellow card) 84'	Report	Aguza (yellow card) 47'; Javi Lara (yellow card) 50'	Stadium: Mini Estadi; Attendance: 2,804; Referee: Víctor Areces Franco (Asturias)

17 September 2017 5	Alcorcón	1–1	Barcelona B	Alcorcón
16:00 CEST	Errasti (yellow card) 42'; Burgos (yellow card); Giménez 76'		Cardona (yellow card) 53'; Aleñá 88'	Stadium: Santo Domingo; Attendance: 3,048; Referee: Rubén Eiriz Mata

25 September 2017 6	Barcelona B	1–2	Lugo	Barcelona
20:30 CEST	Lozano (yellow card) 29'; Aleñá 32'	Report	Vico (yellow card) 42'; Azeez 45'; Bernardo Cruz (yellow card) 56'; Fydriszewski (yellow card) 70'; Iriome 90'	Stadium: Mini Estadi; Attendance: 1,963; Referee: Isidro Díaz De Mera Escuderos

8 October 2017 8	Barcelona B	1–1	Real Oviedo	Barcelona
20:30 CEST	Arnáiz 40'	Report	Hernández 55'	Stadium: Mini Estadi; Attendance: 2,690; Referee: Jorge Figueroa Vázquez

11 October 2017 9	Numancia	1–0	Barcelona B	Soria
20:00 CEST	Guillermo 82' (pen.)	Report		Stadium: Nuevo Estadio Los Pajaritos; Attendance: 3,276; Referee: Gorka Sagués Oscoz

15 October 2017 10	Barcelona B	1–0	Lorca	Barcelona
16:00 CEST	Arnáiz 65'	Report		Stadium: Mini Estadi; Attendance: 1,776; Referee: Luis Mario Milla Alvendiz

21 October 2017 11	Osasuna	2–2	Barcelona B	Pamplona
20:30 CEST	Quique 36'; Mérida 47'	Report	Concha 23'; Aleñá 32'	Stadium: El Sadar; Attendance: 15,253; Referee: Daniel Ocón Arraiz

29 October 2017 12	Barcelona B	1–1	Sevilla Atlético	Barcelona
12:00 CET	Aleñá 3'	Report	Gual 48' (pen.)	Stadium: Mini Estadi; Attendance: 2,491; Referee: Valentín Pizarro Gómez

1 November 2017 7	Gimnàstic	0–0	Barcelona B	Tarragona
18:00 CET		Report		Stadium: Nou Estadi de Tarragona; Attendance: 6,822; Referee: Santiago Varón Aceitón
Note: Postponed due to security concerns by the LFP following the Catalan independence referendum.

5 November 2017 13	Cultural Leonesa	1–1	Barcelona B	León
16:00 CET	Rodri 56'	Report	Lozano 8'	Stadium: Reino de León; Attendance: 8,079; Referee: Álvaro Moreno Aragón

11 November 2017 14	Barcelona B	0–2	Huesca	Barcelona
19:30 CET		Report	Hernández 51', 61'	Stadium: Mini Estadi; Attendance: 2,482; Referee: Jorge Valdés Aller

19 November 2017 15	Rayo Vallecano	1–0	Barcelona B	Madrid
16:00 CET	Trejo 74'	Report		Stadium: Campo de Fútbol de Vallecas; Attendance: 8,923; Referee: Saúl Ais Reig

25 November 2017 16	Barcelona B	1–1	Almería	Barcelona
18:00 CET	Lozano 55'		Verza 65' (pen.); Costa (red card) 88'	Stadium: Mini Estadi; Attendance: 2,124; Referee: Adrián Cordero Vega

3 December 2017 17	Reus	2–1	Barcelona B	Reus
16:00 CET				Stadium: Municipal de Reus

9 December 2017 18	Barcelona B	2–1	Sporting Gijón	Barcelona
20:30 CET				Stadium: Mini Estadi

16 December 2017 19	Cádiz	3–1	Barcelona B	Cádiz
18:00 CET				Stadium: Ramón de Carranza

21 December 2017 20	Barcelona B	0–1	Albacete	Barcelona
20:00 CET				Stadium: Mini Estadi

6 January 2018 21	Real Zaragoza	1–1	Barcelona B	Zaragoza
20:30 CET				Stadium: La Romareda

13 January 2018 22	Barcelona B	0–1	Real Valladolid	Barcelona
18:00 CET				Stadium: Mini Estadi

21 January 2018 23	Tenerife	1–3	Barcelona B	Santa Cruz de Tenerife
18:00 CET				Stadium: Heliodoro Rodríguez López

27 January 2018 24	Barcelona B	3–0	Granada	Barcelona
18:00 CET				Stadium: Mini Estadi

4 February 2018 25	Córdoba	1–2	Barcelona B	Córdoba
18:00 CET				Stadium: Nuevo Arcángel

11 February 2018 26	Barcelona B	0–1	Alcorcón	Barcelona
12:00 CET				Stadium: Mini Estadi

18 February 2018 27	Lugo	1–2	Barcelona B	Lugo
16:00 CET				Stadium: Anxo Carro

24 February 2018 28	Barcelona B	1–1	Gimnàstic	Barcelona
18:00 CET				Stadium: Mini Estadi

4 March 2018 29	Real Oviedo	0–0	Barcelona B	Oviedo
12:00 CET				Stadium: Carlos Tartiere

11 March 2018 30	Barcelona B	2–2	Numancia	Barcelona
18:00 CET				Stadium: Mini Estadi

17 March 2018 31	Lorca	1–1	Barcelona B	Lorca
18:00 CET				Stadium: Francisco Artés Carrasco

25 March 2018 32	Barcelona B	0–2	Osasuna	Barcelona
20:30 CEST				Stadium: Mini Estadi

1 April 2018 33	Sevilla Atlético	3–1	Barcelona B	Sevilla
12:00 CEST				Stadium: Viejo Nervión

8 April 2018 34	Barcelona B	0–1	Cultural Leonesa	Barcelona
18:00 CEST				Stadium: Mini Estadi

14 April 2018 35	Huesca	2–1	Barcelona B	Huesca
18:00 CEST				Stadium: El Alcoraz

22 April 2018 36	Barcelona B	2–3	Rayo Vallecano	Barcelona
16:00 CEST				Stadium: Mini Estadi

29 April 2018 37	Almería	1–0	Barcelona B	Almería
18:00 CEST				Stadium: Juegos Mediterráneos

5 May 2018 38	Barcelona B	0–1	Reus	Barcelona
18:00 CEST				Stadium: Mini Estadi

12 May 2018 39	Sporting Gijón	2–3	Barcelona B	Gijón
18:30 CEST				Stadium: El Molinón

19 May 2018 40	Barcelona B	3–1	Cádiz	Barcelona
19:00 CEST				Stadium: Mini Estadi

27 May 2018 41	Albacete	0–0	Barcelona B	Albacete
20:00 CEST				Stadium: Carlos Belmonte

1 June 2018 42	Barcelona B	0–2	Real Zaragoza	Barcelona
21:00 CEST				Stadium: Mini Estadi
