= 2017–18 Copa Catalunya =

Catalonia Cup

Tournament details
- Country: Catalonia
- Teams: 32

Tournament statistics
- Matches played: 31
- Goals scored: 73 (2.35 per match)

The 2017–18 Copa Catalunya is the 29th staging of the Copa Catalunya. The competition will begin on 30 July 2017 and will be played by teams in Segunda División, Segunda División B, Tercera División and the top teams of Primera Catalana.

== Qualified teams ==
The following teams compete in the 2017–18 Copa Catalunya.

3 teams of 2016–17 Segunda División

- Gimnàstic
- Girona
- Reus

10 teams of 2016–17 Segunda División B

- Badalona
- Barcelona B
- Cornellà
- Espanyol B
- Gavà
- L'Hospitalet
- Llagostera
- Lleida Esportiu
- Prat
- Sabadell

17 teams of 2016–17 Tercera División

- Ascó
- Castelldefels
- Cerdanyola
- Europa
- Figueres
- Granollers
- Júpiter
- La Jonquera
- Manlleu
- Montañesa
- Olot
- Palamós
- Sant Andreu
- Santfeliuenc
- Terrassa
- Vilafranca
- Vilassar de Mar

2 teams of 2016–17 Primera Catalana

- Horta
- Santboià

== Tournament ==
=== First round ===
Matches were played on 29 and 30 July 2017.

- Bye: Gimnàstic, Girona, Reus, Gavà

29 July 2017	Júpiter	1–2	Llagostera	Barcelona
19:00 CEST	R. Peña 3'	fcf.cat	Gavilán 18'; A. Fabregas 80'	Stadium: La Verneda; Referee: Sergio Alegre López

29 July 2017	Horta	1–1 (4–2 p)	Vilassar de Mar	Barcelona
19:00 CEST	S. Arranz 35'	fcf.cat	R. Rovira 67'	Stadium: Feliu i Codina; Referee: Salvador Morros Monge
	Penalties
	Penalty scored Penalty missed		Penalty scored Penalty missed

29 July 2017	Granollers	0–3	Badalona	Granollers
19:00 CEST			K. Lacruz 27'; 89'; A. Rivas 90'	Stadium: Carrer Girona; Referee: Héctor Robas Bondia

29 July 2017	Europa	0–0 (6–5 p)	Ascó	Barcelona
19:00 CEST		fcf.cat		Stadium: Nou Sardenya; Referee: Juan Manuel Martin Varas
	Penalties
	X. Civil (penalty scored); A. Cano (penalty scored); Uri (penalty scored); A. González (penalty scored); Ruben (penalty scored); Alieu (penalty scored)		H. Rodríguez (penalty scored); Peke (penalty scored); Josep Ramón (penalty scored); S. Moreno (penalty scored); Jani (penalty scored); E. Socías (penalty missed)

29 July 2017	Figueres	0–1	Sabadell	Figueres
20:30 CEST		fcf.cat	K. Villaverde 16'	Stadium: Vilatenim; Referee: Alejandro Fernández Pérez

29 July 2017	Terrassa	1–0	Prat	Terrassa
20:30 CEST	D. Toro 3'	fcf.cat		Stadium: Olímpic; Referee: Alejandro Carrillo Vílchez

30 July 2017	La Jonquera	1–2	Espanyol B	La Jonquera
19:00 CEST	M. Jabbie 38'	fcf.cat	Cristo 49'; M. Marcet 57'	Stadium: Municipal; Referee: Sergio Álvarez Ubric

30 July 2017	Santboià	0–2	Barcelona B	Sant Boi de Llobregat
19:00 CEST		fcf.cat	Cardona 57', 84'	Stadium: Joan Baptista Milà; Referee: Óscar Carballo Vázquez

30 July 2017	Vilafranca	1–0	L'Hospitalet	Vilafranca del Penedès
19:00 CEST	D. Acedp 28'	fcf.cat		Stadium: Municipal; Referee: Rubén Mancera Antón

30 July 2017	Castelldefels	2–0	Santfeliuenc	Castelldefels
CEST	C. Olmo 7' (o.g.); O. Uroz 31'	fcf.cat		Stadium: Els Canyars; Referee: Jaume Gibert González

30 July 2017	Cerdanyola	1–1 (3–2 p)	Lleida Esportiu	Cerdanyola del Vallès
19:30 CEST	D. Traore 54'	fcf.cat	J. Muñoz 36'	Stadium: Fontetes; Referee: Pau Garcia Fuster

30 July 2017	Palamós	2–0	Olot	Palamós
20:00 CEST	D. Cano 6'; M. Bonaventura 87'	fcf.cat		Stadium: Palamós Costa Brava; Referee: Raúl Calle Martínez

30 July 2017	Montañesa	3–2	Manlleu	Barcelona
20:00 CEST	D. Bauli 37', 59'; M. Tudó 89'	fcf.cat	C. Martinez 75'; J. Hernández 89' (o.g.)	Stadium: Nou Barris; Referee: Pável Fernández García

30 July 2017	Sant Andreu	0–1	Cornellà	Barcelona
20:00 CEST		fcf.cat	S. Lahrach 6'	Stadium: Narcís Sala; Referee: Gerard Brull Acerete

=== Second round ===
Matches were played on 5, 6, 9 and 10 August 2017.

- Bye: Gimnàstic, Girona, Reus, Llagostera

5 August 2017	Terrassa	2–1	Barcelona B	Terrassa
20:30 CEST	Toro 70'; Daisuke 75'	fcf.cat	Vitinho 65'	Stadium: Olímpic; Referee: Gonzalo Romero Freixas

6 August 2017	Castelldefels	1–0	Gavà	Castelldefels
19:30 CEST				Stadium: Els Canyars

6 August 2017	Palamós	1–4	Espanyol B	Palamós
20:00 CEST				Stadium: Palamós Costa Brava

6 August 2017	Montañesa	1–1 (5–6 p)	Sabadell	Barcelona
20:00 CEST				Stadium: Nou Barris

9 August 2017	Europa	1–1 (6–7 p)	Vilafranca	Barcelona
20:30 CEST				Stadium: Nou Sardenya

9 August 2017	Horta	2–1	Badalona	Barcelona
20:30 CEST				Stadium: Feliu i Codina

10 August 2017	Cerdanyola	1–3	Cornellà	Cerdanyola del Vallès
20:00 CEST				Stadium: Fontetes

=== Third round ===
Matches were played on 12 and 13 August 2017.

- Bye: Gimnàstic, Girona, Reus

12 August 2017	Terrassa	1–2	Vilafranca	Terrassa
20:30				Stadium: Olímpic

13 August 2017	Llagostera	1–1 (3–2 p)	Espanyol B	Llagostera
19:30				Stadium: Municipal

13 August 2017	Castelldefels	0–4	Cornellà	Castelldefels
19:30				Stadium: Els Canyars

13 August 2017	Horta	1–1 (5–4 p)	Sabadell	Barcelona
20:30				Stadium: Feliu i Codina

=== Fourth round ===
Matches played on 19 and 25 October 2017.

- Bye: Horta

19 October 2017	Llagostera	0–0 (6–5 p)	Girona	Llagostera
20:00				Stadium: Municipal

25 October 2017	Vilafranca	1–1 (1–3 p)	Gimnàstic	Vilafranca del Penedès
20:30				Stadium: Municipal

25 October 2017	Cornellà	1–0	Reus	Cornellà de Llobregat
20:45				Stadium: Nou Camp

=== Semi-finals ===
Matches were played on 15 and 22 November 2017.

15 November 2017	Cornellà	3–1	Gimnàstic	Cornellà de Llobregat
20:15				Stadium: Nou Camp

22 November 2017	Horta	1–1 (6–5 p)	Llagostera	Barcelona
20:00				Stadium: Feliu i Codina

=== Final ===
2 June 2018
20:00

Horta	2–3	Cornellà
Berlanga 4'; Tejada 40'	Report	Fall 12'; Mujica 23'; Merchán 66'

La Bòbila, Gavà
Referee: Ávalos Martos

Horta	Cornellà

Horta:
1	(Spain) Andrés Díez
3	(Spain) Sergio Castillo
7	(Spain) Domingo Berlanga		(substituted off) 69'
8	(Spain) Fernando Galeano
10	(Spain) Edgar Tejada	(yellow card) 70'
14	(Spain) Jota
15	(Spain) Guillem Rodríguez
17	(Spain) Gerard Nolla		(substituted off) 69'
18	(Spain) Genís Blasco		(substituted off) 60'
19	(Spain) Marc Río		(substituted off) 60'
22	(Spain) Salva Torreño		(substituted off) 78'
Substitutes:
13	(Spain) Sergio Sánchez
2	(Spain) Joan Vives
5	(Spain) Abdoul-Gassim Barry
6	(Spain) Juan Carricondo	(yellow card) 86'	(substituted in) 69'
11	(Spain) Pablo Beguer		(substituted in) 60'
20	(Spain) Isaac Maldonado		(substituted in) 69'
21	(Spain) Javier Santolalla		(substituted in) 60'
23	(Spain) Diego Garzón		(substituted in) 78'
Manager:
(Spain) Nacho Castro

Cornellà:
1	(Spain) Ramón Juan		(substituted off) 46'
2	(Spain) Pere Martínez	(yellow card) 37'
3	(Spain) Valentín Merchán
4	(Spain) Edgar González
5	(Spain) Enric Maureta		(substituted off) 60'
6	(Senegal) Abdoulaye Fall	(yellow card) 57' (yellow-red card) 80'
8	(Spain) Óscar Reche	(yellow card) 41'	(substituted off) 60'
9	(Spain) Rafa Mújica		(substituted off) 60'
10	(Spain) Néstor Gordillo	(yellow card) 58'	(substituted off) 82'
11	(Spain) Ricard Pujol
21	(China) Gao Leilei		(substituted off) 50'
Substitutes:
13	(Spain) Carlos Craviotto		(substituted in) 46'
12	(Spain) Marc Caballé		(substituted in) 60'
14	(Spain) Borja López	(yellow card) 68'	(substituted in) 60'
15	(Spain) Ignasi Villarrasa		(substituted in) 82'
16	(Spain) Sergio Gómez
17	(Spain) Kilian Honorato
18	(Netherlands) Leon de Kogel		(substituted in) 50'
19	(Spain) Joan Oriol		(substituted in) 60'
Manager:
(Spain) Jordi Roger
