= Carles Pérez =

Spanish footballer (born 1998)

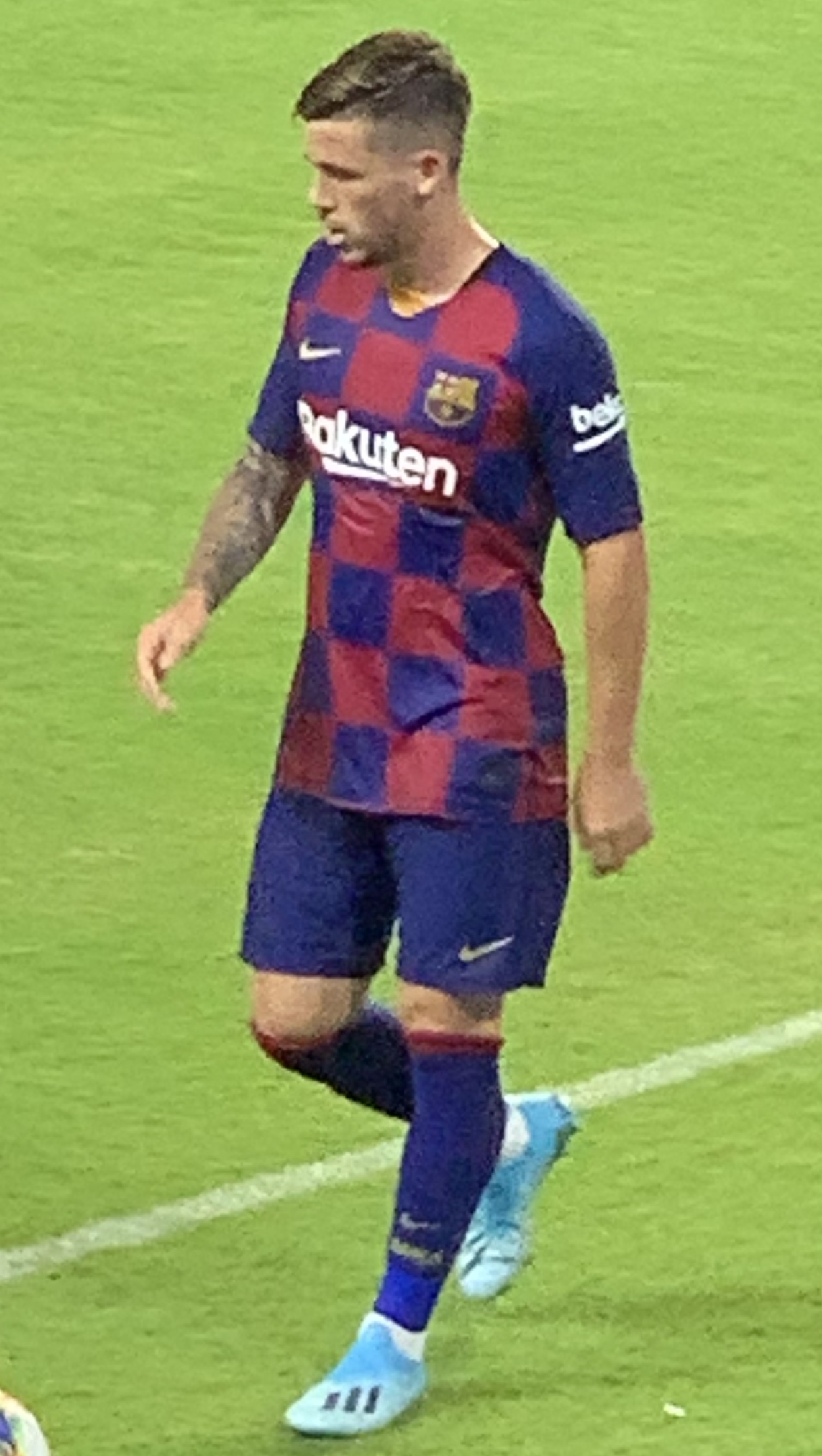
- Pérez with Barcelona in 2019

Personal information
- Full name: Carles Pérez Sayol
- Date of birth: 16 February 1998 (age 28)
- Place of birth: Granollers, Spain
- Height: 1.73 m (5 ft 8 in)
- Positions: Right winger; attacking midfielder

Team information
- Current team: Girona
- Number: 23

Youth career
- 2003–2006: Vilanova de la Roca
- 2006–2008: Damm
- 2008–2012: Espanyol
- 2012–2017: Barcelona

Senior career*
Years	Team	Apps	(Gls)
2015–2020	Barcelona B	55	(13)
2019–2020	Barcelona	11	(1)
2020	→ Roma (loan)	14	(1)
2020–2023	Roma	40	(3)
2022–2023	→ Celta (loan)	35	(3)
2023–2026	Celta	16	(1)
2024–2025	→ Getafe (loan)	27	(3)
2025–2026	→ Aris (loan)	23	(1)
2026–	Girona	8	(3)

International career
2014	Spain U16	3	(4)
2014–2015	Spain U17	14	(10)
2019	Spain U21	1	(0)
- * Club domestic league appearances and goals as of 24 October 2026

Carles Pérez Sayol (born 16 February 1998) is a Spanish professional footballer who plays as a right winger and attacking midfielder for Segunda División club Girona.

== Career ==
=== Barcelona ===
Born in Granollers, Barcelona, Catalonia, Pérez joined FC Barcelona's youth setup in 2012, from RCD Espanyol. On 3 October 2015, while still a youth, he made his senior debut with the reserves by coming on as a second-half substitute for Maxi Rolón in a 0–0 Segunda División B away draw against Levante UD B.

In July 2017, Pérez was promoted to the B-side, now in Segunda División. He made his professional debut on 19 August 2017, replacing Vitinho in a 2–1 away win against Real Valladolid.

Pérez scored his first professional goals on 21 January 2018, netting a hat-trick in a 3–1 away defeat of CD Tenerife. On 12 June, after suffering relegation with the reserve side, he renewed his contract for two further years.

Pérez made his first team – and La Liga – debut on 19 May 2019, replacing Malcom in a 2–2 away draw against SD Eibar. He scored his first goal for the Blaugrana on 25 August, scoring his team's third in a 5–2 home routing of Real Betis. He scored his first UEFA Champions League goal as the opener in a 2–1 away victory against Inter Milan.

=== Roma ===
On 30 January 2020, Pérez left Barcelona for Italian side Roma, in a loan move with the obligation to purchase his rights permanently for a fee of €11 million in the summer. He scored his first UEFA Europa League goal in a 1–0 home victory against Gent in the Round of 32. He scored his first Serie A goal in a 6–1 away win against SPAL.

=== Celta ===
On 8 August 2022, RC Celta de Vigo announced that they had reached an agreement in principle with Roma for the loan transfer of Pérez. The following day, he returned to his home country after officially signing a loan deal with Celta.

On 30 June 2023, Pérez joined Celta on a four-year permanent deal.

==== Loans to Getafe and Aris Thessaloniki ====
On 30 July 2024, Pérez was loaned to fellow top tier side Getafe CF for the 2024–25 campaign. On 10 July of the following year, he moved to Super League Greece side Aris Thessaloniki FC also in a temporary deal.

On 1 September 2026, Pérez terminated his link with Celta.

=== Girona ===
On 3 September 2026, Pérez signed a one-year deal with Girona FC in the second division.

== Personal life ==
On 27 August 2020 he tested positive for COVID-19. In July 2025, Pérez was admitted into a hospital after being bitten in the genital area by a dog.

== Career statistics ==
=== Club ===
As of match played 27 October 2026

Appearances and goals by club, season and competition
Club	Season	League			National Cup		Europe		Other		Total	
Club	Season	Division	Apps	Goals	Apps	Goals	Apps	Goals	Apps	Goals	Apps	Goals
Barcelona B	2015–16	Segunda División B	1	0	—						1	0
Barcelona B	2017–18	Segunda División	27	3	—						27	3
Barcelona B	2018–19	Segunda División B	26	9	—		—		—		26	9
Barcelona B	2019–20	Segunda División B	1	1	—		—		—		1	1
Barcelona B	Total		55	13	—		—		—		55	13
Barcelona	2018–19	La Liga	1	0	0	0	0	0	0	0	1	0
Barcelona	2019–20	La Liga	10	1	1	0	1 (Note: Appearances in UEFA Champions League)	1	0	0	12	2
Barcelona	Total		11	1	1	0	1	1	0	0	13	2
Roma (loan)	2019–20	Serie A	14	1	0	0	3 (Note: Appearances in UEFA Europa League)	1	—		17	2
Roma	2020–21	Serie A	21	2	1	0	9	1	—		31	3
Roma	2021–22	Serie A	19	1	1	0	8 (Note: Appearances in UEFA Conference League)	2	—		28	3
Roma	Total		54	4	2	0	20	4	—		76	8
Celta (loan)	2022–23	La Liga	35	3	3	2	—				38	5
Celta	2023–24	La Liga	16	1	3	2	—				19	3
Getafe (loan)	2024–25	La Liga	27	3	3	0	—		—		30	3
Aris (loan)	2025–26	Super League Greece	23	1	3	0	1	0	—		27	1
Girona	2026–27	Segunda División	8	3	1	0	—		—		9	3
Career total			229	29	16	4	22	5	0	0	267	38

== Honours ==
Roma

- UEFA Europa Conference League: 2021–22

Barcelona

- La Liga: 2018–19
- UEFA Youth League: 2017–18
