= Igor Arnáez =

Spanish footballer (born 1991)

Personal information
- Full name: Igor Arnáez Martín
- Date of birth: 30 April 1991 (age 35)
- Place of birth: Bilbao, Spain
- Height: 1.73 m (5 ft 8 in)
- Position: Left-back

Youth career
- 2005–2009: Athletic Bilbao
- 2009–2010: Danok Bat

Senior career*
Years	Team	Apps	(Gls)
2010–2011	Lemona	26	(0)
2011–2014	Bilbao Athletic	29	(0)
2011–2012	→ Sestao (loan)	20	(0)
2012–2013	→ Amorebieta (loan)	29	(0)
2014–2015	Tenerife	7	(0)
2015–2016	Sestao	33	(0)
2016–2017	Barakaldo	19	(0)
2018–2019	Gernika	25	(0)
2019–2020	Arenas	11	(0)
Total		209	(0)
- * Club domestic league appearances and goals

Igor Arnáez Martín (born 30 April 1991) is a Spanish former professional footballer who played as a left-back.

== Club career ==
Born in Bilbao, Biscay, Basque Country, Arnáez graduated with Danok Bat CF's youth setup, after a short stint with Athletic Bilbao. He made his debuts as a senior with SD Lemona in the 2010–11 campaign, in Segunda División B.

In July 2011 Arnáez returned to Athletic, being assigned to the reserves also in the third level. However, after appearing sparingly, he was loaned to fellow league teams Sestao River Club and SD Amorebieta, respectively.

On 26 May 2014 Arnáez was released by the Lions, and moved to Segunda División's CD Tenerife on 27 August. He played his first match as a professional on 9 September, starting and playing the full 90 minutes in a 0–0 away draw against Girona FC for the season's Copa del Rey.
