= Lucas Gafarot =

Spanish footballer

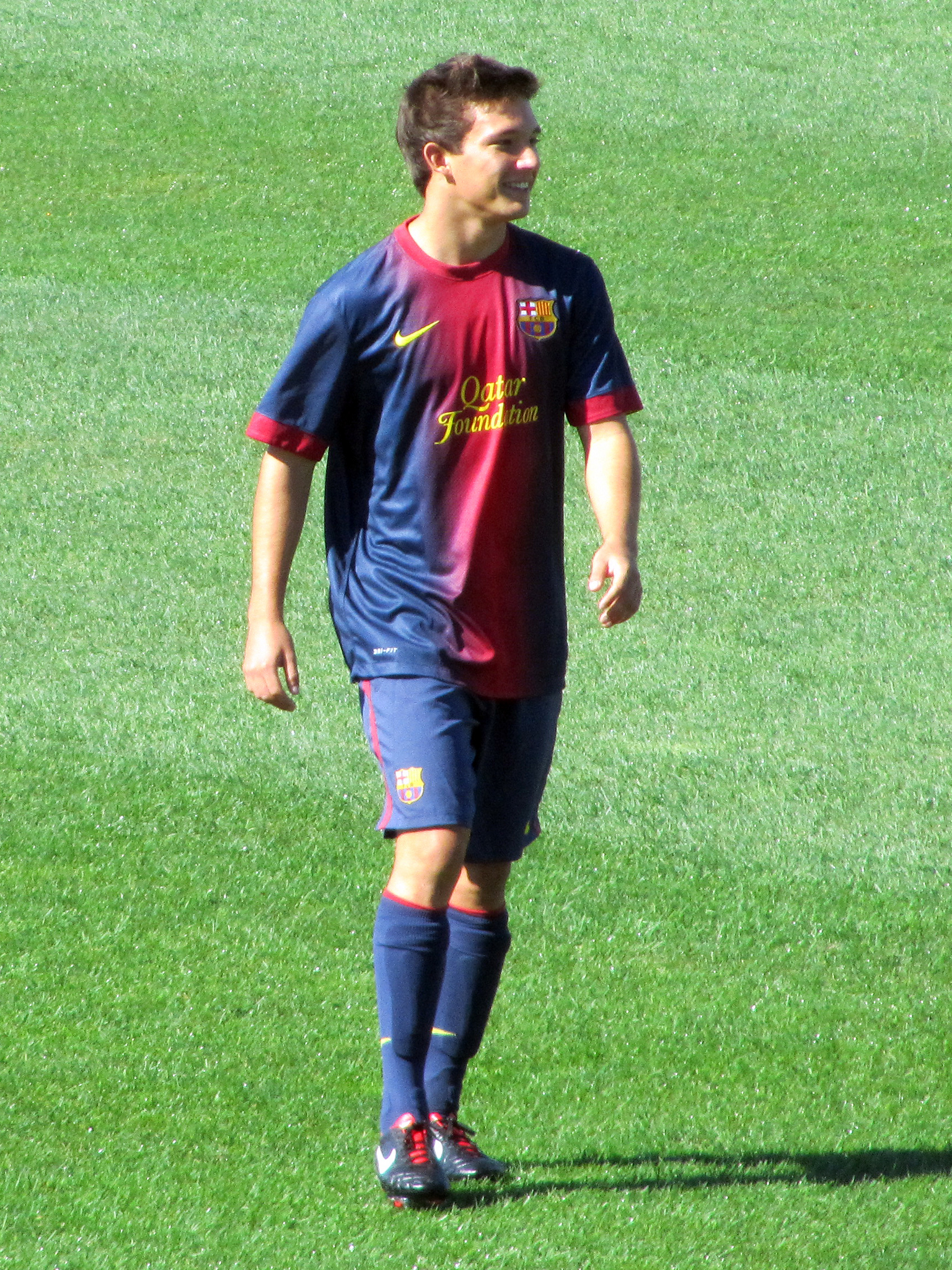
- Gafarot playing for Barcelona B in 2013

Personal information
- Full name: Lucas Gafarot Santacatalina
- Date of birth: 26 September 1994 (age 32)
- Place of birth: Sant Just Desvern, Spain
- Height: 1.73 m (5 ft 8 in)
- Position: Left back

Youth career
- 2002–2006: Sant Just
- 2006–2012: Cornellà
- 2012–2013: Barcelona

Senior career*
Years	Team	Apps	(Gls)
2013–2017	Barcelona B	21	(0)
2015–2017	→ Cornellà (loan)	62	(1)
2020–2021	Sant Just	0	(0)
Total		83	(1)
- * Club domestic league appearances and goals

Lucas Gafarot Santacatalina (born 26 September 1994), known as simply Lucas, is a Spanish footballer who plays as a left back.

== Club career ==
Born in Sant Just Desvern, Barcelona, Catalonia, Lucas joined FC Barcelona's youth setup in 2012, after representing UE Cornellà and CF Sant Just. On 10 June of the following year, he was promoted to the reserves in Segunda División.

On 8 September 2013 Lucas made his professional debut, starting in a 2–2 away draw against CD Tenerife. On 12 August 2015 he returned to Cornellà, after agreeing to a one-year loan deal.

== Club statistics ==
As of 7 June 2015

Club	Season	League		Cup		Europe		Other		Total	
Club	Season	Apps	Goals	Apps	Goals	Apps	Goals	Apps	Goals	Apps	Goals
Barcelona B	2013–14	7	0	—						7	0
Barcelona B	2014–15	14	0	—						14	0
Barcelona B	Total	21	0	—						21	0
Career totals		21	0	—						21	0
