= Juana Teresa Juega López =

Spanish poet

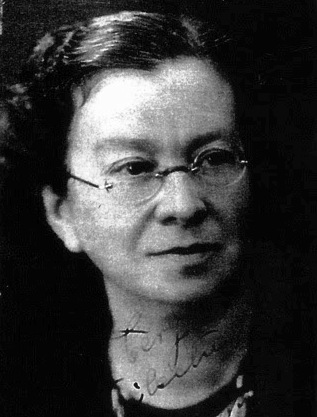
Juana Teresa Juega López

Juana Teresa Juega López (Laxe, 8 April 1885 – Melide, 3 December 1979) was a Spanish poet of Galicia who wrote in Galician and Spanish.

== Biography ==
She was the daughter of the doctor, Ramón Juega Charlín. From the age of five to thirteen, she lived in Tacuarembó, Uruguay, where her mother came from. Back in Galicia, the family settled in A Coruña, where her father ran a spa. Starting in 1904, her verses, in Galician and Spanish, were published in Él Eco de Galicia and El Compostelano.

Juega López wrote a book of poetry, Alma que llora, with a foreword by Leopoldo Pedreira Taibo and a dedication by José María Riguera Montero. This displeased her boyfriend, Lieutenant José Morales Vilar, so much so that in March 1908, he shot Juega López several times, seriously wounding her, and then committed suicide. The book was never published.

Two years later, Juega López married Emilio Pereiro Quiroga, a lawyer from Melide, with whom she had four children. They resided successively in Caldas de Reis, Arzúa, Palas de Rei, Melide and Santiago de Compostela. During the Spanish Civil War, Juega López was a member of Catholic Action and an activist who favored CEDA. She collaborated in demonstrations and acts in favor of Francoism.

Her poem ,"A muerte", appears in the 1911 anthology, Uxío Carré Aldao. Her great-nephew, José-María Monterroso Devesa, made a compilation of Juega López's work, more than seventy compositions, eight of them in Galician, and they were published in 2000 in the Boletín del Centro de Estudios Melidenses. They are also included in Museo de la Tierra de Melide n.º 13.

== Recognition ==
- Writer, Gran Enciclopedia Galega Silverio Cañada, since 2005.
- Illustrious people, Museo de Melide.
