= Laxe =

Municipality in Galicia, Spain

Coordinates: 43.2167°N 9°W

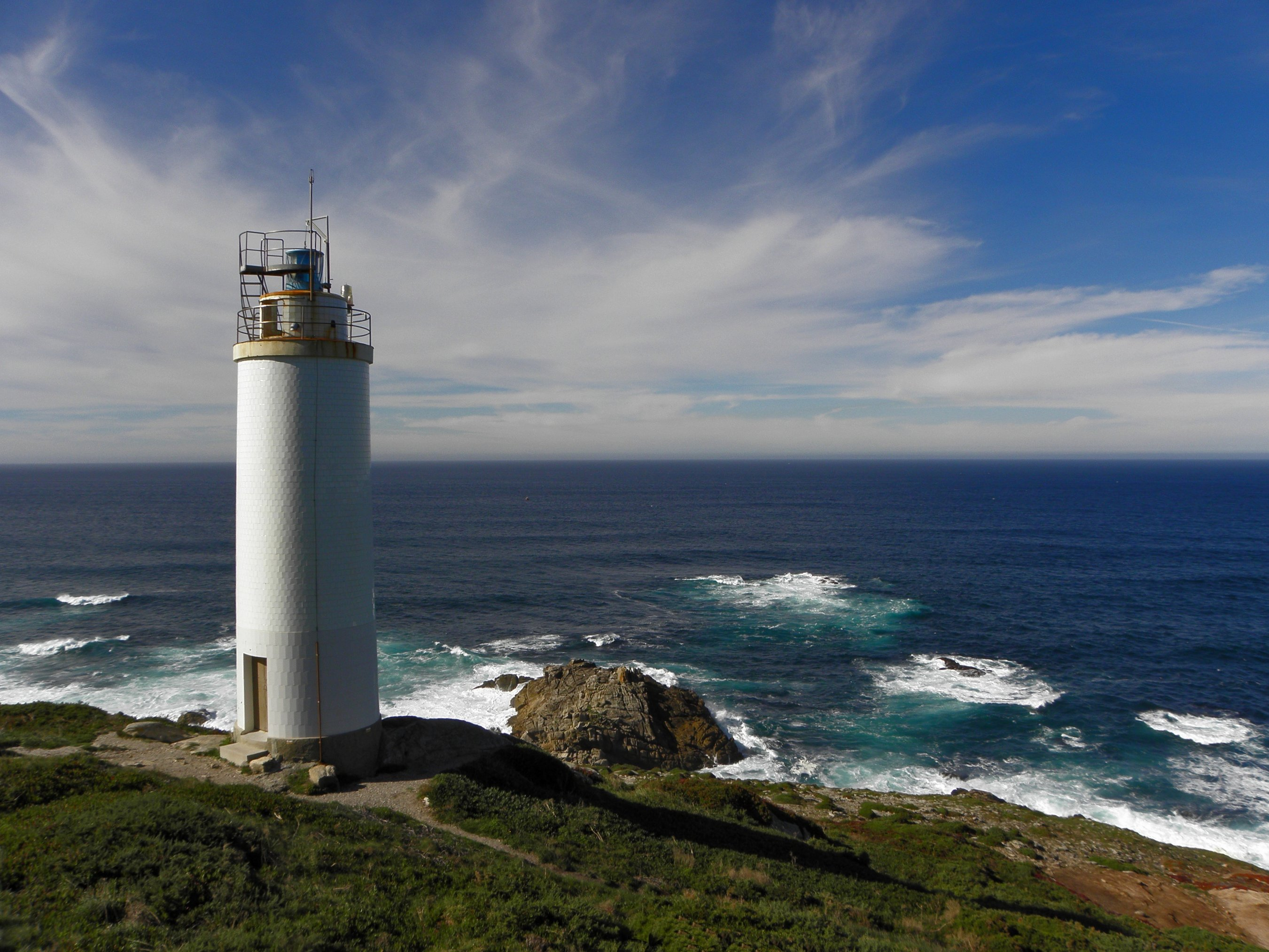

- Coat of arms

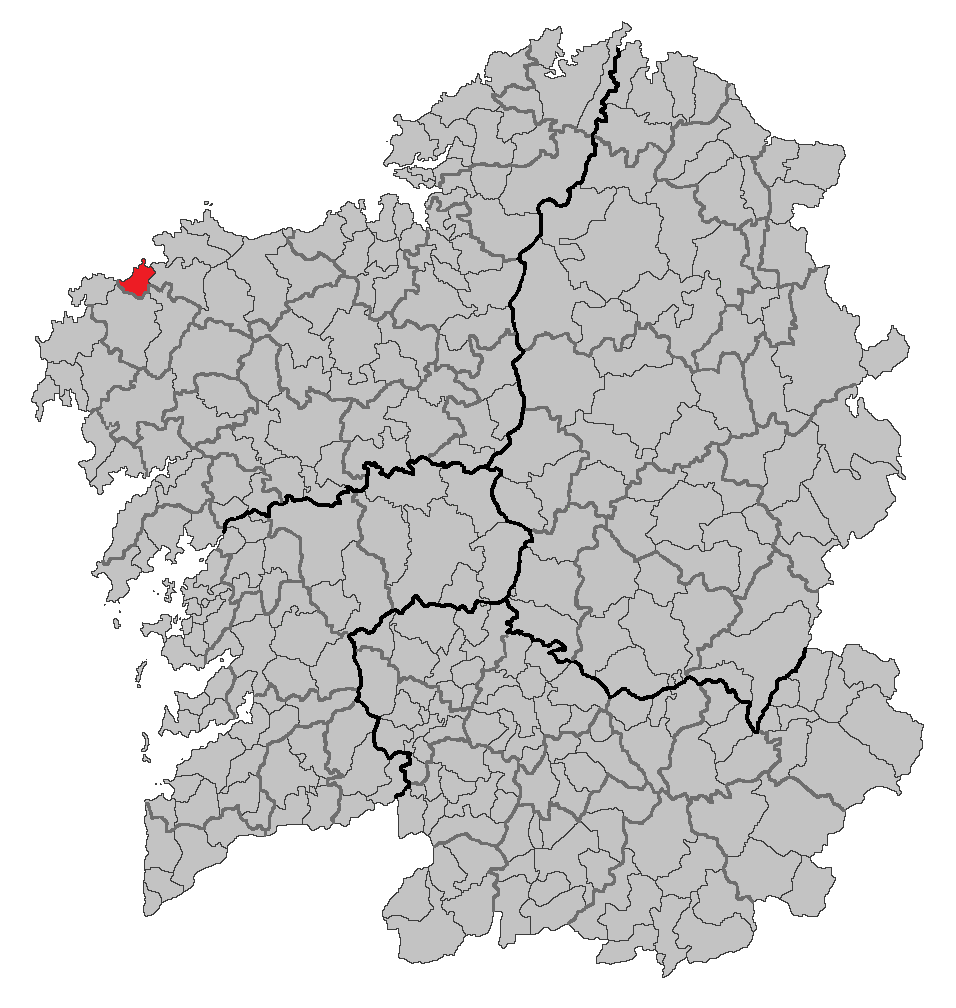
- Location of Laxe within Galicia
- Parroquias: Laxe, Nande, Sarces, Serantes, Soesto & Traba

Area
  - Total: 37.48 km^{2} (14.47 sq mi)

Population (2025-01-01)
  - Total: 2,883
  - Density: 76.92/km^{2} (199.2/sq mi)
- Time zone: UTC+1 (CET)
  - Summer (DST): UTC+2 (CEST)
- Website: http://www.concellodelaxe.com

Laxe (Galician pronunciation: [ˈlaʃɪ]; Spanish: Lage ['laxe]) is a northwestern municipality of Spain in the province of A Coruña, in the autonomous community of Galicia. It belongs to the comarca of Bergantiños. It is situated in the sheltered Cabanas bay area, meaning that Laxe's expansive sandy beaches are well-sheltered from Atlantic winds.

Laxe's average temperatures vary greatly, with an average winter-time high of 10-12 celsius, compared to highs of 31-33 celsius in June–July.

== Demography ==
From:INE Archiv

== Notable people ==
- Juana Teresa Juega López (1885-1979), poet
- Anxo Mato commonly known as Anxo, is a Spanish footballer who plays for CF Villanovense as a winger.

== See also ==
List of municipalities in A Coruña
