= Ferrán Sarsanedas =

Spanish footballer

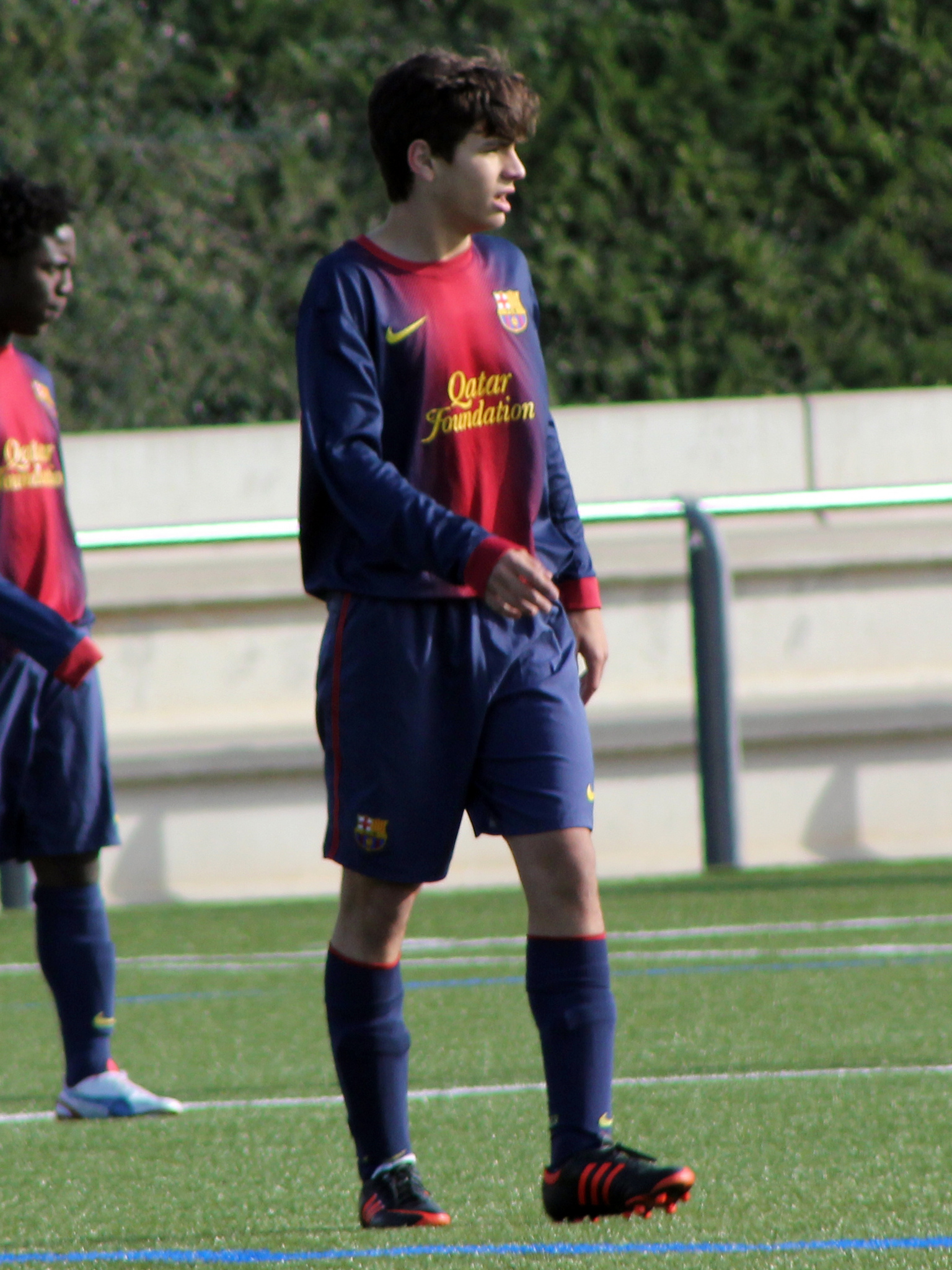
- Sarsanedas in 2012

Personal information
- Full name: Ferrán Sarsanedas Soler
- Date of birth: 11 February 1997 (age 29)
- Place of birth: Amer, Spain
- Height: 1.77 m (5 ft 9 1/2 in)
- Position: Defensive midfielder

Team information
- Current team: Vilanova

Youth career
- 2003–2005: Amer
- 2005–2006: La Cellera de Ter
- 2006–2007: Girona
- 2007–2016: Barcelona

Senior career*
Years	Team	Apps	(Gls)
2016–2021	Barcelona B	58	(0)
2022–2023	Elche B	20	(3)
2023–2025	Prat	41	(4)
2025–	Vilanova	7	(0)

International career
2013	Spain U16	2	(0)
2013–2014	Spain U17	8	(0)
- * Club domestic league appearances and goals as of 8 November 2025

Ferrán Sarsanedas Soler (born 11 February 1997) is a Spanish professional footballer who plays as a defensive midfielder for Tercera Federación club Vilanova.

== Club career ==
Born in Amer, Girona, Catalonia, Sarsanedas joined FC Barcelona's youth setup in 2007, from Girona FC. Ahead of the 2016–17 campaign, he was promoted to the reserves in Segunda División B, and made his senior debut on 27 August 2016 by coming on as a substitute for Fali in a 3–1 away win against Hércules CF.

Sarsanedas contributed with 33 appearances for the side, achieving promotion to Segunda División in the play-offs. On 29 August 2017 he made his professional debut, starting in a 0–3 home loss against CD Tenerife.

== Career statistics ==
As of 4 January 2020

Club	League	Season	League		Copa del Rey		Europe		Other		Total	
Club	League	Season	Apps	Goals	Apps	Goals	Apps	Goals	Apps	Goals	Apps	Goals
Barcelona B	Segunda División B	2016–17	28	0	—				5 (Note: Five appearances in Segunda División B play-offs)	0	33	0
Barcelona B	Segunda División	2017–18	13	0	—				0	0	13	0
Barcelona B	Segunda División B	2018–19	7	0	—				0	0	7	0
Barcelona B	Segunda División B	2019–20	10	0	—				0	0	10	0
Barcelona B	Total		58	0	—				5	0	63	0
Career total			58	0	0	0	0	0	5	0	63	0
