= Esteban Muñoz =

Spanish footballer

Personal information
- Full name: Esteban Muñoz Nogales
- Date of birth: 27 August 1984 (age 42)
- Place of birth: Palma de Mallorca, Spain
- Height: 1.81 m (5 ft 11 in)
- Position: Centre back

Youth career
- 2000–2002: San Pedro
- 2002–2003: Ferriolense

Senior career*
Years	Team	Apps	(Gls)
2003–2007	Ferriolense		
2007	Los Palacios	0	(0)
2007–2010	Atlético Baleares	87	(6)
2010–2013	Constància	100	(7)
2013–2017	Atlético Baleares	133	(5)
2017–2018	Llagostera	33	(0)
2018–2019	Villanovense	14	(1)
2019	Iraklis	17	(0)
2019–2020	Olímpic Xàtiva	13	(0)
2020–2021	Elana Toruń	44	(6)
- * Club domestic league appearances and goals as of 10:55, 2 January 2022 (UTC)

Esteban Muñoz Nogales (born 27 December 1984) is a Spanish former professional footballer who played as a centre back.

== Club career ==
Born in Palma de Mallorca, Balearic Islands, Muñoz joined the youth academy of UD San Pedro at the age of 16. Two years later, he switched to CD Ferriolense and made his senior debut against a subsidiary team of RCD Mallorca. In 2007, he signed with UD Los Palacios which competed in Tercera División. However, without making any appearance he returned to Balearic Islands and joined CD Atlético Baleares and helped in promotion to Segunda División B in his first season with the club.

Ahead of the 2010–11 season, Muñoz moved to CE Constància. On 26 July 2012, his contract was extended by one year. On 12 July 2013, he rejoined CD Atlético Baleares in the third tier. After collecting more than 100 caps for the side, he left the club on 28 June 2017.

On 26 July 2017, Muñoz moved to fellow league club UE Llagostera. On 16 June 2018, he switched to CF Villanovense but left the side by mutual consent at the end of the season.

On 22 January 2019, Muñoz moved abroad and joined Greek Football League club Iraklis.
