= Iñigo Ros =

Spanish footballer

Personal information
- Full name: Iñigo Ros Añón
- Date of birth: 21 October 1982 (age 44)
- Place of birth: Tudela, Spain
- Height: 1.75 m (5 ft 9 in)
- Position: Midfielder

Youth career
- Real Sociedad

Senior career*
Years	Team	Apps	(Gls)
2001–2006	Real Sociedad B	89	(1)
2006–2010	Jaén	150	(7)
2010–2012	Eibar	42	(0)
2012–2014	Tenerife	61	(2)
2014–2016	Huesca	51	(2)
2016–2017	Tudelano	28	(0)
Total		421	(12)

Managerial career
- 2017–2018: Tudelano (assistant)
- * Club domestic league appearances and goals

Inigo Ros Añón (born 21 October 1982) is a Spanish former professional footballer who played as a midfielder.

== Club career ==
Born in Tudela, Navarre, Ros began his professional career at Real Sociedad, making his senior debut with the B team in the 2001–02 season, in the Segunda División B. He played a further three and a half years with the Basque club before joining Real Jaén in January 2006, acting as captain of the latter.

Ros spent the following four campaigns competing with the Andalusians, leaving in June 2010 and signing with SD Eibar also in the third division. In July 2012 he moved to CD Tenerife still in the third tier, finishing his first season with 40 appearances (playoffs included) as the Canarians returned to Segunda División after a two-year absence.

On 29 September 2013, aged nearly 31, Ros played his first professional match, starting the 1–0 home win over Real Madrid Castilla. He scored his first league goal on 10 November, in a 2–0 victory against former side Eibar also at the Estadio Heliodoro Rodríguez López.

On 6 July 2014, Ros moved to third-tier SD Huesca.

== Personal life ==
Ros' younger brother, Javier, was also a footballer and a midfielder. He also represented Real Sociedad B and Eibar.
