= Thiaguinho (footballer, born 1987) =

Brazilian footballer

Personal information
- Full name: Thiago Benevides Gonçalves
- Date of birth: September 4, 1987 (age 39)
- Place of birth: Niterói, Brazil
- Height: 1.71 m (5 ft 7 in)
- Position: Winger

Team information
- Current team: Ferriolense

Youth career
- 2006: Fluminense

Senior career*
Years	Team	Apps	(Gls)
2007–2009	Fluminense	0	(0)
2008–2009	→ Duque de Caxias (loan)	?	(1)
2009–2010	Olaria	?	(?)
2010–2014	Atlético Baleares	73	(11)
2014–2015	Racing Ferrol	10	(1)
2015–2016	Llosetense	19	(4)
2016–	Ferriolense	0	(0)
- * Club domestic league appearances and goals as of 13 March 2016

Thiago Benevides Gonçalves, commonly known as Thiaguinho (born September 4, 1987), is a Brazilian footballer who plays for Spanish club CD Ferriolense as a left winger.

== Club career ==
Born in Niterói, Rio de Janeiro, Thiaguinho graduated from Fluminense Football Club's youth setup. However, he failed to appear in the first-team squad, and was subsequently loaned to Série C side Duque de Caxias Futebol Clube in 2008. With the latter he appeared regularly, scoring once.

In 2009 Thiaguinho moved to Olaria Atlético Clube. After 1 1/2 seasons with the club, he moved abroad for the first time in his career, joining Segunda División B's CD Atlético Baleares. In July 2011 he renewed his link with the Balearic side, becoming a regular starter afterwards.

On 20 July 2014 Thiaguinho joined Racing de Ferrol, also in the third level. On 22 January of the following year he rescinded with the club, after appearing in only ten league matches.
