= Guillem Martí =

Spanish footballer

Guillem
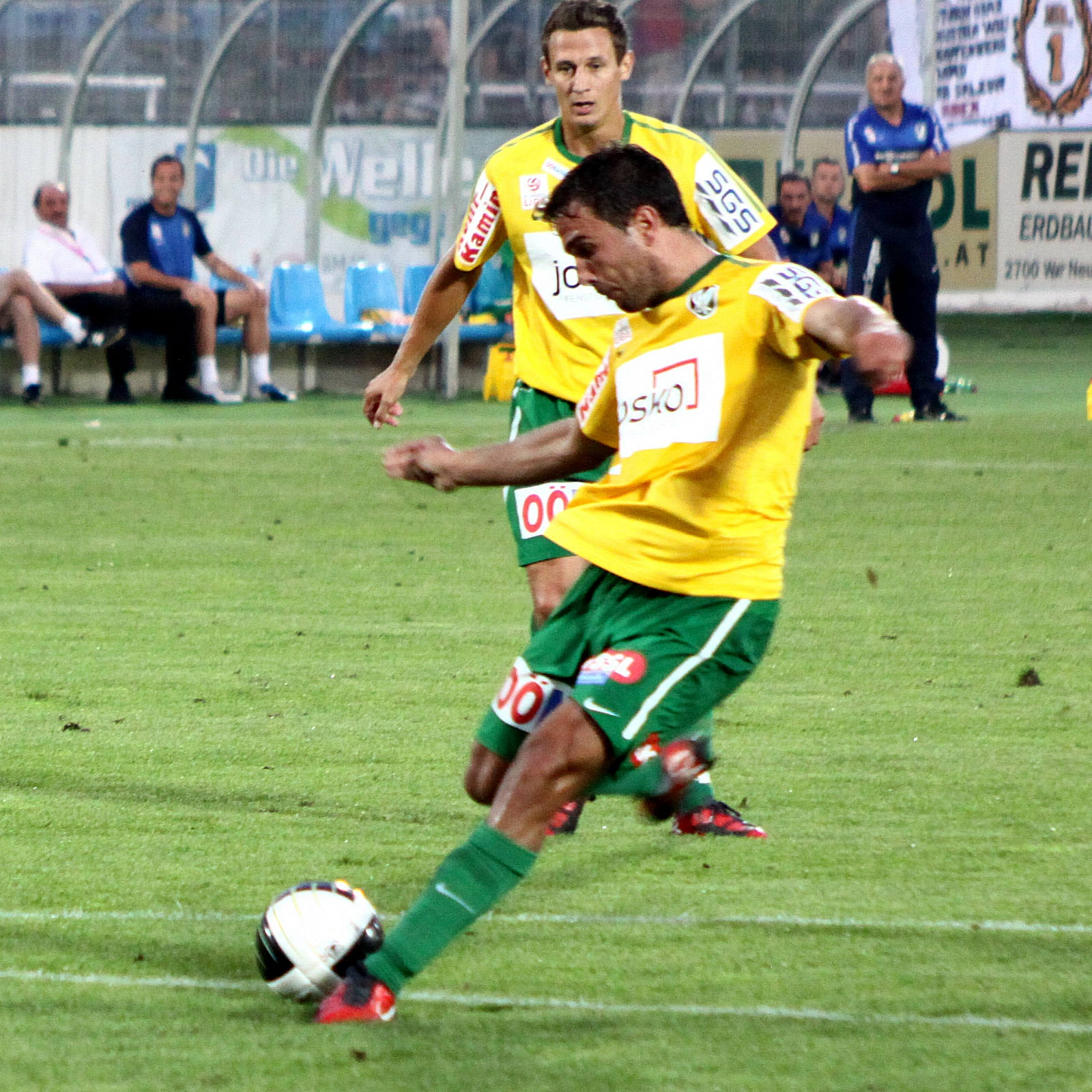
- Guillem playing for Ried in 2010

Personal information
- Full name: Guillem Martí Misut
- Date of birth: 5 September 1985 (age 41)
- Place of birth: Es Mercadal, Spain
- Height: 1.80 m (5 ft 11 in)
- Position: Forward

Team information
- Current team: Mahón

Youth career
- Mallorca
- 2003–2004: Cádiz

Senior career*
Years	Team	Apps	(Gls)
2002–2003	Alaior		
2004–2005	Sariñena	?	(21)
2005–2006	Universidad Zaragoza	29	(7)
2005–2006	Zaragoza B	9	(0)
2006–2007	Sporting Mahonés		
2007–2008	Igualada	35	(14)
2008–2009	Terrassa	15	(1)
2009–2010	Sporting Mahonés	37	(17)
2010–2012	Ried	58	(13)
2012–2014	Tenerife	32	(4)
2014–2015	Huesca	25	(9)
2015	Marbella	15	(2)
2015–2016	Guadalajara	18	(4)
2016	Compostela	15	(4)
2016	Lleida Esportiu	16	(4)
2017	Palencia	14	(3)
2017–2018	Mercadal	15	(2)
2018	New Radiant		
2018–2022	Mercadal	113	(64)
2022–	Mahón	58	(30)
- * Club domestic league appearances and goals as of 05:18, 7 July 2025 (UTC)

Guillem Martí Misut (Spanish pronunciation: [ɡiˈʎen]; born 5 September 1985), known simply as Guillem, is a Spanish professional footballer who plays for UD Mahón as a forward.

== Club career ==
Born in Es Mercadal, Balearic Islands, Guillem spent the vast majority of his career in his country in the Segunda División B or lower. The exception to this was in the first part of the 2013–14 season, when he played four competitive matches for CD Tenerife. His first in the Segunda División was on 18 August 2013, when he came on as a late substitute in a 1–0 away loss against AD Alcorcón.

From 2010 to 2012, Guillem competed in the Austrian Football Bundesliga with SV Ried. His league debut came on 17 July 2010 in a 0–3 home defeat to SK Sturm Graz, and his first goal(s) arrived on 21 August as he scored a hat-trick in a 5–0 away victory over SC Wiener Neustadt.
