= Sergi Puig =

Spanish footballer

Personal information
- Full name: Sergi Puig Herrera
- Date of birth: 19 November 1998 (age 27)
- Place of birth: Premià de Mar, Spain
- Height: 1.85 m (6 ft 1 in)
- Position: Goalkeeper

Team information
- Current team: Girona
- Number: 1

Youth career
- Premià Dalt
- Vilassar Mar
- 2013–2017: Barcelona

Senior career*
Years	Team	Apps	(Gls)
2017–2020	Barcelona B	7	(0)
2017–2018	→ Hospitalet (loan)	23	(0)
2018–2019	→ Conquense (loan)	3	(0)
2020–2021	Las Palmas B	19	(0)
2021–2022	Ponferradina	1	(0)
2022–2023	Sabadell	18	(0)
2023–2024	Sestao River	33	(0)
2024–2026	Girona B	59	(0)
2026–	Girona	0	(0)
- * Club domestic league appearances and goals as of 15 May 2026

Sergi Puig Herrera (born 19 November 1998) is a Spanish footballer who plays as a goalkeeper for Girona FC.

== Club career ==
=== Barcelona ===
Puig was born in Premià de Mar, Barcelona, Catalonia, and joined FC Barcelona's La Masia in 2013, from UE Vilassar de Mar. On 1 April 2017, while still a youth, he made his senior debut with the reserves by starting in a 12–0 Segunda División B home routing of CD Eldense.

On 12 August 2017, after finishing his formation, Puig was loaned to Tercera División side CE L'Hospitalet. On 24 August of the following year, he renewed his contract with Barça until 2020, and moved to UB Conquense in the third division also in a temporary deal.

Back at the B-team for the 2019–20 campaign, Puig acted as a backup to Iñaki Peña before leaving on 30 June 2020 as his contract expired.

=== Las Palmas ===
On 25 September 2020, Puig signed for UD Las Palmas, being initially assigned to the B-side in division three. He featured regularly for the B's while also being a third-choice in the main squad, behind Álvaro Valles and Álex Domínguez.

=== Ponferradina ===
On 21 July 2021, Puig agreed to a contract with SD Ponferradina of the Segunda División. A third-choice behind fellow new signings Amir Abedzadeh and Lucho García, he made his club debut on 1 December, starting in a 2–0 away success over CP Cacereño in the season's Copa del Rey.

Puig made his professional debut on 15 December 2021, starting in a 2–1 home win over UD Ibiza, also in the national cup. He made his league debut the following 27 March, starting in a 3–1 away loss against CD Mirandés.

=== Sabadell and Sestao River ===
On 16 July 2022, free agent Puig joined Primera Federación side CE Sabadell FC. After sharing the starting spot with Adrián Ortolá, he moved to fellow league team Sestao River Club on 31 July 2023.

=== Girona ===
On 12 July 2024, Puig signed a two-year contract with La Liga side Girona FC, being initially assigned to the B-team in Tercera Federación. On 15 July 2026, he agreed to a new one-year deal, being promoted to the main squad now in Segunda División.
