= Francis Ferrón =

Spanish footballer

Personal information
- Full name: Francisco Jesús Ferrón Ruiz
- Date of birth: 5 February 1990 (age 36)
- Place of birth: Algeciras, Spain
- Height: 1.84 m (6 ft 1/2 in)
- Position: Forward

Team information
- Current team: St Joseph's
- Number: 9

Youth career
- Taraguilla

Senior career*
Years	Team	Apps	(Gls)
2009–2010	Taraguilla	20	(18)
2010	Los Barrios	4	(0)
2010–2011	Taraguilla		
2011–2012	Algeciras	32	(15)
2012–2013	Recreativo B	30	(18)
2013	Recreativo	4	(0)
2013–2014	Sant Andreu	22	(6)
2014	La Hoya Lorca	18	(8)
2014–2015	Alcoyano	34	(8)
2015–2016	Linares	19	(3)
2016	La Hoya Lorca	18	(5)
2016–2017	Linense	32	(6)
2017–2018	Marbella	33	(13)
2018–2019	Badajoz	38	(12)
2019–2022	San Fernando	86	(29)
2022–2023	Badajoz	34	(4)
2023–2024	Águilas	32	(6)
2024–2025	Minera	18	(3)
2025	La Unión Atlético	14	(4)
2025–2026	Malacitano	27	(4)
2026–	St Joseph's	4	(5)
- * Club domestic league appearances and goals as of 10 October 2026

Francisco "Francis" Jesús Ferrón Ruiz (born 6 February 1990) is a Spanish footballer who plays for Gibraltar Football League club St Joseph's as a forward.

== Club career ==
Born in Algeciras, Francis made his senior debuts with AD Taraguilla. In July 2010 he joined UD Los Barrios in Tercera División but left the club in October for personal reasons, and returned to his previous club shortly after.

On 4 June 2011 Francis joined Algeciras CF, also in the fourth level. After scoring 15 goals for the Andalusians, he moved to Recreativo de Huelva, initially assigned to the reserves in the same division.

On 16 March 2013 Francis played his first match as a professional, coming on as a second-half substitute in a 1–3 home loss against Girona FC. He appeared in four matches (one start, 108 minutes of action) with the main squad during the campaign.

In July 2013 Francis signed with UE Sant Andreu, in Segunda División B; in January of the following year he moved to league rivals La Hoya Lorca CF, scoring eight goals for the latter in the season. On 5 July 2014 he signed for CD Alcoyano, still in the third division.

In July 2015, Francis signed with Linares Deportivo for a year, but left the following January and returned to his former club Lorca. On 13 July 2016 he joined Real Balompédica Linense, still in the third division.

On 19 June 2026, Ferrón joined St Joseph's.
