= Anxo Mato =

Spanish footballer

Anxo
Personal information
- Full name: Ángel Mato Pose
- Date of birth: 30 March 1982 (age 44)
- Place of birth: Laxe, Spain
- Height: 1.75 m (5 ft 9 in)
- Position: Winger

Youth career
- 1996–1997: Baio
- 1997–1998: Galicia Gaiteira
- 1998–1999: Bergantiños

Senior career*
Years	Team	Apps	(Gls)
1999–2002	Compostela B		
2000–2004	Compostela	60	(7)
2002–2003	→ Burgos (loan)	26	(3)
2004–2008	Ourense	87	(15)
2008–2009	Ceuta	20	(0)
2009–2010	Racing Villalbés	14	(2)
2010	Villanovense	18	(2)
2010–2011	Santa Comba	15	(1)
2011–2016	Villanovense	175	(28)
2016–2017	Valdivia	2	(2)
2017–2018	Santa Amalia	24	(1)
2019–2020	Valdivia	21	(1)
- * Club domestic league appearances and goals

Ángel Mato Pose (born 30 March 1982), commonly known by his Galician name Anxo, is a Spanish former footballer who played as a winger.

== Club career ==
Born in Laxe, A Coruña, Galicia, Anxo graduated from Bergantiños FC's youth academy. He joined SD Compostela in 1999, being initially assigned to the reserves.

On 3 September 2000, Anxo played his first match as a professional, coming on as a late substitute in a 0–0 home draw against Real Betis in the Segunda División championship. He scored his first goal on 5 November, netting the first of a 2–1 home win over UD Salamanca.

In the summer of 2002, Anxo moved to Burgos CF of Segunda División B in a season-long loan deal. He eventually returned to Compos in June of the following year, after struggling with injuries.

In 2004, Anxo signed for CD Ourense also in the third level. On 4 July 2008, after scoring nine goals during the campaign, he joined fellow league club AD Ceuta.

Anxo subsequently resumed his career in the third division but also in Tercera División, representing RC Villalbés, CF Villanovense (two stints) and Santa Comba CF.
