= Sergio Gómez (footballer, born 1991) =

Spanish footballer

Personal information
- Full name: Sergio Gómez Cegarra
- Date of birth: 30 March 1991 (age 35)
- Place of birth: Barcelona, Spain
- Height: 1.73 m (5 ft 8 in)
- Position: Defensive midfielder

Team information
- Current team: Cornellà

Youth career
- 2008–2010: Cornellà

Senior career*
Years	Team	Apps	(Gls)
2010–2011	Villarreal C	19	(0)
2011–2013	Villarreal B	1	(0)
2011–2012	→ Palencia (loan)	26	(0)
2012–2013	→ Sant Andreu (loan)	26	(0)
2013–2014	Badalona	28	(0)
2014–	Cornellà	88	(3)
- * Club domestic league appearances and goals as of 12 March 2017

Sergio Gómez Cegarra (born 30 March 1991) is a Spanish footballer who plays for UE Cornellà as a defensive midfielder.

== Football career ==
Born in Barcelona, Catalonia, Gómez played youth football with local UE Cornellà, making his senior debuts with Villarreal CF C in the 2010–11 Tercera División season. On 4 June 2011, he made his professional debut, appearing with the B-team in the last 23 minutes of a 1–2 away loss against Real Betis in the Segunda División.

In August 2011, Gómez was loaned to CF Palencia of the Segunda División B. A year later, he joined another Segunda B club, UE Sant Andreu, also on loan.

Gómez signed as a free agent with third-tier club CF Badalona in July 2013. On 23 June of the following year, he moved back to divisional rivals Cornellà.
