= UE Cornellà =

Spanish association football club

Coordinates: 41.347631°N 2.073557°E

Cornellà
- Full name: Unió Esportiva Cornellà, S. A. D.
- Founded: 29 April 1951; 75 years ago
- Stadium: Camp Municipal de Cornellà
- Capacity: 3,724
- Owner: Lionel Messi
- President: Alex Talavera
- Head coach: Ignasi Senabre
- League: Tercera Federación – Group 5
- 2025–26: Tercera Federación – Group 5, 3rd of 18
- Website: www.uecornella.cat
Home colours	Away colours

Unió Esportiva Cornellà, S. A. D. is a Spanish football team based in Cornellà de Llobregat, in the autonomous community of Catalonia. Founded on 29 April 1951, it plays in Tercera Federación – Group 5, holding home games at Estadi Palamós Costa Brava, which has a capacity of 3,724.

== History ==
Club logo until 2021

Unión Deportiva Cornellà was founded on 29 April 1951 by the merging of Club Atlético Padró and Academia Junyent. Since its foundation the club participated in regional competitions and Tercera División until the season 2013/2014, when it achieved the historic promotion to the Segunda División B.

On 6 January 2021, Cornellà upset La Liga giants Atlético Madrid by a score of 1–0 in the second round of the Copa del Rey. They were eliminated in the following round by Barcelona, as the final score was 2–0 after extra time.

On 16 April 2026, footballer Lionel Messi acquired full ownership of Cornellà.

=== Club background ===
- Unión Deportiva Cornellá (1951–1999)
- Unió Esportiva Cornellà (1999–)

== Season to season ==
Season	Tier	Division	Place	Copa del Rey
1951–52	6	2ª Reg.	11th	
1952–53	6	2ª Reg.	5th	
1953–54	6	3ª Reg.	7th	
1954–55	5	2ª Reg.	8th	
1955–56	5	2ª Reg.	2nd	
1956–57	5	2ª Reg.	2nd	
1957–58	4	1ª Reg.	4th	
1958–59	4	1ª Reg.	17th	
1959–60	4	1ª Reg.	7th	
1960–61	4	1ª Reg.	13th	
1961–62	4	1ª Reg.	3rd	
1962–63	4	1ª Reg.	10th	
1963–64	4	1ª Reg.	17th	
1964–65	4	1ª Reg.	17th	
1965–66	5	2ª Reg.		
1966–67	4	1ª Reg.	16th	
1967–68	4	1ª Reg.	9th	
1968–69	4	Reg. Pref.	15th	
1969–70	4	Reg. Pref.	11th	
1970–71	5	1ª Reg.	2nd	

Season	Tier	Division	Place	Copa del Rey
1971–72	5	1ª Reg.	3rd	
1972–73	5	1ª Reg.	10th	
1973–74	5	1ª Reg.	7th	
1974–75	5	1ª Reg.	8th	
1975–76	5	1ª Reg.	6th	
1976–77	5	1ª Reg.	4th	
1977–78	5	Reg. Pref.	6th	
1978–79	5	Reg. Pref.	14th	
1979–80	5	Reg. Pref.	9th	
1980–81	5	Reg. Pref.	15th	
1981–82	5	Reg. Pref.	19th	
1982–83	6	1ª Reg.	7th	
1983–84	6	1ª Reg.	6th	
1984–85	6	1ª Reg.	4th	
1985–86	6	1ª Reg.	8th	
1986–87	6	1ª Reg.	6th	
1987–88	6	1ª Reg.	13th	
1988–89	6	1ª Reg.	12th	
1989–90	6	1ª Reg.	2nd	
1990–91	6	1ª Reg.	1st	

Season	Tier	Division	Place	Copa del Rey
1991–92	6	Pref. Terr.	3rd	
1992–93	6	Pref. Terr.	5th	
1993–94	6	Pref. Terr.	3rd	
1994–95	6	Pref. Terr.	4th	
1995–96	6	Pref. Terr.	1st	
1996–97	5	1ª Cat.	5th	
1997–98	5	1ª Cat.	9th	
1998–99	5	1ª Cat.	2nd	
1999–2000	4	3ª	4th	
2000–01	4	3ª	15th	
2001–02	4	3ª	18th	
2002–03	5	1ª Cat.	1st	
2003–04	4	3ª	10th	
2004–05	4	3ª	16th	
2005–06	4	3ª	17th	
2006–07	5	1ª Cat.	6th	
2007–08	5	1ª Cat.	1st	
2008–09	4	3ª	12th	
2009–10	4	3ª	5th	
2010–11	4	3ª	8th	

Season	Tier	Division	Place	Copa del Rey
2011–12	4	3ª	5th	
2012–13	4	3ª	2nd	
2013–14	4	3ª	1st	
2014–15	3	2ª B	15th	Round of 32
2015–16	3	2ª B	5th	
2016–17	3	2ª B	9th	Third round
2017–18	3	2ª B	4th	
2018–19	3	2ª B	4th	First round
2019–20	3	2ª B	4th	First round
2020–21	3	2ª B	5th / 1st	Round of 32
2021–22	3	1ª RFEF	14th	First round
2022–23	3	1ª Fed.	11th	
2023–24	3	1ª Fed.	18th	
2024–25	4	2ª Fed.	14th	
2025–26	5	3ª Fed.	3rd	
2026–27	5	3ª Fed.		

- 3 seasons in Primera Federación/Primera División RFEF
- 7 seasons in Segunda División B
- 1 season in Segunda Federación
- 12 seasons in Tercera División
- 2 seasons in Tercera Federación

== Players ==
=== Current squad ===
As of 9 October 2025.

Note: Flags indicate national team as defined under FIFA eligibility rules; some limited exceptions apply. Players may hold more than one non-FIFA nationality.

No.	Pos.	Nation	Player
1	GK	ESP	Rubén Miño
2	DF	ESP	Diego Garzón
3	DF	ESP	Gerard González
4	DF	ESP	Iván de la Peña
5	DF	ESP	Tomás Peñalba
6	MF	ESP	Ot Serrano
7	FW	ESP	Ibai Reches
9	FW	ESP	Héctor Tejada
10	FW	ESP	Víctor Aliaga
11	FW	ESP	Marc Fernández
12	FW	ESP	Santiago Guzmán

No.	Pos.	Nation	Player
13	GK	ESP	Isaac Vila
14	DF	ESP	Gonzalo Pereira
15	DF	ESP	Alejandro Pereira
16	MF	ESP	Moha Ajani
17	DF	ESP	Dídac Rodríguez
18	MF	ESP	Ian Arqués
19	MF	ESP	Joan Benet
21	FW	SRB	Stefan Golubovic
22	DF	ESP	Manel Lozano
23	FW	ESP	Leo dos Reis

== Honours ==
- Tercera División
  - Champions (1): 2013–14
- Copa Catalunya
  - Champions (1): 2017–18

== Notable players ==
- (Jordan) Tha'er Bawab (youth)
- (Senegal) Keita Baldé (youth)
- (Spain) Pep Caballé
- (Spain) Enric Gallego
- (Spain) David García
- (Spain) Eloy Gila
- (Spain) Sergio Gómez
- (Spain) Borja López
- (Spain) Pere Martínez
- (Spain) Rubén Miño (youth)
- (Spain) Ignasi Miquel (youth)
- (Spain) Xavi Moro
- (Spain) Xavi Puerto
- (Spain) David Raya (youth)
- (Spain) Víctor Ruiz (youth)
- (Spain) Enric Vallès
- (Spain) Gerard Martín
- (United States) Pedro Soma
