= Vitinho (footballer, born March 1998) =

Brazilian footballer

Personal information
- Full name: Victor Hugo Santana Carvalho
- Date of birth: 24 March 1998 (age 28)
- Place of birth: São Paulo, Brazil
- Height: 1.75 m (5 ft 9 in)
- Position: Attacking midfielder

Youth career
- 2011–2016: Palmeiras

Senior career*
Years	Team	Apps	(Gls)
2016–2021	Palmeiras	6	(0)
2017–2018	→ Barcelona B (loan)	25	(1)
2019	→ São Caetano (loan)	10	(2)
2019–2021	→ Red Bull Bragantino (loan)	23	(0)
2021–2026	Red Bull Bragantino	14	(3)
2022	→ Guarani (loan)	9	(0)
2023	→ Juventude (loan)	0	(0)
2026	→ Noroeste (loan)	0	(0)
- * Club domestic league appearances and goals as of 13:36, 17 December 2021 (UTC)

Victor Hugo Santana Carvalho (born 24 March 1998), commonly known as Vitinho, is a Brazilian professional footballer who plays as an attacking midfielder.

== Club career ==
Born in São Paulo, Vitinho joined Palmeiras' youth setup in 2011. On 28 April 2016 he was promoted to the first team, signing a contract until 2021.

Vitinho made his first team – and Série A – debut on 21 June 2016, coming on as a substitute for Cleiton Xavier in a 2–0 home win against América Mineiro. However, he appeared in only one more match for the side during the year, again from the bench.

On 10 July 2017, after still being rarely used, Vitinho was loaned to FC Barcelona for one year, being assigned to the reserves in Segunda División; the deal was made official the following day.

== Honours ==
Palmeiras

- Campeonato Brasileiro Série A: 2016, 2018
