= 2017–18 Córdoba CF season =

Córdoba CF
2017–18 season
- Chairman: Carlos González
- Manager: Luis Carrión
- Stadium: Nuevo Arcángel
- Segunda División: -
Home colours	Away colours

During the 2017–18 season, Córdoba CF participated in the Spanish LaLiga 1|2|3, and the Copa del Rey.

== Squad ==
As of 2 September 2017

Note: Flags indicate national team as defined under FIFA eligibility rules; some limited exceptions apply. Players may hold more than one non-FIFA nationality.

No.	Pos.	Nation	Player
1	GK	SRB	Igor Stefanović
2	DF	ESP	José Antonio Caro
3	DF	ESP	Dani Pinillos
4	MF	ESP	Álex Vallejo
5	MF	ESP	Sergio Aguza
6	MF	ESP	Edu Ramos
7	MF	ESP	Javi Lara
9	FW	HON	Jona Mejía
10	MF	ESP	Alejandro Alfaro
11	MF	ESP	Javi Galán
13	GK	POL	Paweł Kieszek

No.	Pos.	Nation	Player
14	FW	ESP	Sergi Guardiola
15	DF	ESP	Miguel Loureiro
16	DF	POR	João Afonso (on loan from Vitória Guimarães)
17	DF	ESP	José Manuel Fernández
18	DF	ESP	Josema
19	MF	ESP	Jaime Romero
20	MF	ESP	Esteve Monterde
21	MF	ESP	Carlos Caballero (2nd captain)
22	MF	SRB	Saša Jovanović
23	MF	SRB	Saša Marković
—	DF	ESP	Javi Noblejas (on loan from Rayo Vallecano)

=== Transfers ===
- List of Spanish football transfers summer 2017#Córdoba

==== In ====
Date	Player	From	Type	Fee	Ref
30 June 2017	(Spain) Borja Domínguez	(Spain) Oviedo	Loan return	Free	
30 June 2017	(Spain) Abel Moreno	(Spain) Ponferradina	Loan return	Free	
1 July 2017	(Spain) Esteve	(Spain) Córdoba B	Promoted		
1 July 2017	(Spain) Javi Galán	(Spain) Córdoba B	Promoted		
1 July 2017	(Spain) Marc Vito	(Spain) Córdoba B	Promoted		
1 July 2017	(Spain) Alberto Quiles	(Spain) Córdoba B	Promoted		
1 July 2017	(Spain) Álex Vallejo	(Spain) Mallorca	Transfer	Free	
1 July 2017	(Spain) Sergi Guardiola	(Spain) Granada B	Transfer	Free	
1 July 2017	(Spain) Miguel Loureiro	(Spain) Pontevedra	Transfer	Free	
1 July 2017	(Spain) Dani Pinillos	(England) Nottingham Forest	Transfer	Free	
2 July 2017	(Spain) José Fernández	(Spain) Oviedo	Transfer	Free	
2 July 2017	(Spain) Josema	(Spain) Almería B	Transfer	Free	
2 July 2017	(Honduras) Jona	(Spain) Albacete	Transfer	€400K	
8 July 2017	(Spain) Jaime Romero	(Spain) Osasuna	Transfer	€500K	
9 July 2017	(Portugal) João Afonso	(Portugal) Vitória Guimarães	Loan	Free	
26 July 2017	(Serbia) Igor Stefanović	(Portugal) Moreirense	Transfer	Free	

==== Out ====
Date	Player	To	Type	Fee	Ref
30 June 2017	(Spain) Guille Donoso	(Spain) Lugo	Transfer	Free	
1 July 2017	(Spain) Pedro Ríos	TBD		Free	
1 July 2017	(Spain) Domingo Cisma	TBD		Free	
1 July 2017	(France) Jonathan Bijimine	TBD		Free	
1 July 2017	(Spain) Samu de los Reyes	TBD		Free	
1 July 2017	(Italy) Federico Piovaccari	(China) Zhejiang Yiteng	Transfer	Free	
6 July 2017	(Spain) Borja Domínguez	(Spain) Alcorcón	Transfer	€100K	
8 July 2017	(Spain) Antoñito	(Spain) Valladolid	Transfer	Free	
11 July 2017	(Spain) Héctor Rodas	(Belgium) Cercle Brugge	Transfer	Free	
12 July 2017	(Spain) Deivid	(Spain) Valladolid	Transfer	Free	
14 July 2017	(Spain) Luso	(Spain) Huesca	Transfer	Free	
18 July 2017	(Spain) Abel Moreno	(Spain) Zaragoza B	Transfer	Free	
19 July 2017	(Morocco) Zakarya Bergdich	(France) Sochaux	Transfer	Free	
25 July 2017	(Spain) Marc Vito	(Spain) Extremadura	Loan	Free	
28 July 2017	(Spain) Rodri	(Spain) Cultural Leonesa	Transfer	Free	
31 July 2017	(Ghana) Brimah Razak	(South Africa) Mamelodi Sundowns	Transfer	Free	
31 July 2017	(Spain) Juli	(Spain) Hércules	Transfer	Free	
1 August 2017	(Spain) Alberto Quiles	(Spain) UCAM Murcia	Loan	Free	
7 August 2017	(Argentina) Mariano Bíttolo	(Spain) Albacete	Transfer	Free	

== Competitions ==
=== Overall ===
Competition	Final position
Segunda División	-
Copa del Rey	-

=== Liga ===
==== League table ====
Pos	Team	Pld	W	D	L	GF	GA	GD	Pts
14	Reus	42	12	16	14	31	42	−11	52 (Note: Alcorcón finished ahead of Reus and Gimnàstic on head-to-head points: Alcorcón 10 pts, Reus 5 pts, Gimnàstic 1 pt)
15	Gimnàstic	42	15	7	20	44	50	−6	52
16	Córdoba	42	15	6	21	57	65	−8	51
17	Albacete	42	11	16	15	35	46	−11	49
18	Almería	42	12	12	18	38	45	−7	48 (Note: Almería finished ahead of Cultural Leonesa on head-to head points: Cultural Leonesa 0–0 Almería, Almería 2–1 Cultural Leonesa)

Source: La Liga
Rules for classification: 1) points; 2) head-to-head points; 3) head-to-head goal difference; 4) goal difference; 5) number of goals scored

==== Matches ====
Kickoff times are in CET. Win Draw Loss

Match	Opponent	Venue	Result
1	Cádiz	H	1–2
2	Albacete	A	0–3
3	Zaragoza	H	1–2
4	Barcelona B	A	4–0
5	Tenerife	H	2–0
6	Granada	A	3–1
7	Vallad.	A	4–1
8	Alcorcón	H	3–0
9	Lugo	A	2–0
10	Nàstic	H	1–5
11	Oviedo	A	2–0
12	Numancia	H	1–1
13	Lorca	A	1–0
14	Osasuna	H	0–1
15	Sevilla At	A	1–1
16	Cultural	H	2–2
17	Huesca	A	3–1
18	Rayo	H	2–2
19	Almería	A	1–0
20	Reus	H	5–0
21	Sp. Gijón	A	3–2

Match	Opponent	Venue	Result
1	Cádiz	A	2–0
2	Albacete	H	1–0
3	Zaragoza	A	1–0
4	Barcelona B	H	1–2
5	Tenerife	A	5–1
6	Granada	H	1–2
7	Vallad.	H	2–1
8	Alcorcón	A	1–2
9	Lugo	H	1–0
10	Nàstic	A	0–2
11	Oviedo	H	1–1
12	Numancia	A	2–1
13	Lorca	H	1–0
14	Osasuna	A	1–1
15	Sevilla At	H	3–0
16	Cultural	A	2–1
17	Huesca	H	2–4
18	Rayo	A	1–2
19	Almería	H	2–0
20	Reus	A	1–2
21	Sp. Gijón	H	3–0
