= 2020–21 Elche CF season =

Elche
2020–21 season
- President: Joaquín Buitrago Marhuenda
- Head coach: Jorge Almirón (until 12 February); Fran Escribá (from 14 February)
- Stadium: Manuel Martínez Valero
- La Liga: 17th
- Copa del Rey: Round of 32
- Top goalscorer: League: Lucas Boyé (7); All: Lucas Boyé (8)
- Biggest win: Alavés 0–2 Elche; Elche 2–0 Athletic Bilbao
- Biggest defeat: Elche 0–3 Real Sociedad; Barcelona 3–0 Elche
Home colours	Away colours	Third colours
- All statistics correct as of 22 May 2021.

The 2020–21 season was the 53rd season in the existence of Elche CF and the club's first season back in the top flight of Spanish football. In addition to the domestic league, Elche participated in this season's edition of the Copa del Rey. The season covered the period from 24 August 2020 to 30 June 2021, with the late start to the season due to the COVID-19 pandemic in Spain.

== Players ==
=== First-team squad ===
As of 7 March 2021.

Note: Flags indicate national team as defined under FIFA eligibility rules; some limited exceptions apply. Players may hold more than one non-FIFA nationality.

No.	Pos.	Nation	Player
1	GK	ARG	Paulo Gazzaniga (on loan from Tottenham Hotspur)
2	DF	ESP	Diego González
4	MF	ARG	Iván Marcone (on loan from Boca Juniors)
5	DF	ESP	Gonzalo Verdú (3rd captain)
6	MF	COD	Omenuke Mfulu
7	FW	ESP	Nino (captain)
8	MF	ESP	Víctor Rodríguez
9	FW	ARG	Lucas Boyé (on loan from Torino)
10	MF	ESP	Pere Milla
11	MF	ESP	Tete Morente
12	DF	ESP	Dani Calvo
13	GK	ESP	Édgar Badía (vice-captain)

No.	Pos.	Nation	Player
14	MF	ESP	Raúl Guti
15	MF	ESP	Luismi
16	MF	ESP	Fidel
17	MF	ESP	Josan
18	DF	COL	Helibelton Palacios
19	DF	ESP	Antonio Barragán
20	MF	ARG	Pablo Piatti
21	FW	ARG	Guido Carrillo
22	FW	ARG	Emiliano Rigoni (on loan from Zenit Saint Petersburg)
23	DF	ESP	Cifu
24	DF	ESP	Josema
25	DF	COL	Johan Mojica (on loan from Girona)

=== Reserve team ===
Note: Flags indicate national team as defined under FIFA eligibility rules; some limited exceptions apply. Players may hold more than one non-FIFA nationality.

No.	Pos.	Nation	Player
26	MF	ESP	John Nwankwo
28	GK	ESP	Luis Castillo
29	FW	ESP	Nacho Ramón
30	MF	ESP	César Moreno
32	DF	ESP	Gerard Barri

No.	Pos.	Nation	Player
33	DF	ESP	José Salinas
37	MF	ESP	Jony Álamo
40	FW	ESP	Diego Bri
45	GK	ESP	Lluis Andreu

=== Out on loan ===
Note: Flags indicate national team as defined under FIFA eligibility rules; some limited exceptions apply. Players may hold more than one non-FIFA nationality.

No.	Pos.	Nation	Player
—	DF	ESP	Nacho Pastor (at Lorca Deportiva until 30 June 2021)
—	MF	ESP	Jony Ñíguez (at Alcoyano until 30 June 2021)
—	MF	ESP	Ramón Folch (at Tenerife until 30 June 2021)

No.	Pos.	Nation	Player
—	FW	ESP	Manu Justo (at Celta Vigo B until 30 June 2021)
—	FW	MAR	Mourad El Ghezouani (at Alcoyano until 30 June 2021)

== Transfers ==
=== In ===
Date	Player	From	Type	Fee	Ref.
15 September 2020	(Colombia) Jeison Lucumí	(Mexico) UANL	Transfer	Free	
15 September 2020	(Argentina) Juan Sánchez Miño	(Argentina) Independiente	Transfer	Free	
16 September 2020	(Spain) Tete Morente	Málaga	Transfer	€500K	
20 September 2020	(Spain) Raúl Guti	Zaragoza	Transfer	€5M	
21 September 2020	(Argentina) Lucas Boyé	(Italy) Torino	Loan		
22 September 2020	(Spain) Cifu	Málaga	Transfer	Free	
25 September 2020	(Spain) Luismi	Valladolid	Transfer	Free	
30 September 2020	(Mali) Youssouf Koné	(France) Lyon	Loan		
4 October 2020	(Spain) Antonio Barragán	Real Betis	Transfer	Free	
5 October 2020	(Argentina) Guido Carrillo	(England) Southampton	Transfer	Free	
5 October 2020	(Argentina) Iván Marcone	(Argentina) Boca Juniors	Loan		
5 October 2020	(Argentina) Emiliano Rigoni	(Russia) Zenit Saint Petersburg	Transfer	Undisclosed	
5 October 2020	(Argentina) Diego Rodríguez	(Argentina) Defensa y Justicia	Loan		
9 October 2020	(Spain) Diego González	Málaga	Transfer	Free	
15 January 2021	(Colombia) Johan Mojica	Girona	Loan		
1 February 2021	(Argentina) Paulo Gazzaniga	(England) Tottenham Hotspur	Loan		
4 February 2021	(Colombia) Helibelton Palacios	(Colombia) Atlético Nacional	Transfer	Free	
6 March 2021	(Argentina) Pablo Piatti	(Canada) Toronto FC	Transfer	Free	

=== Out ===
Date	Player	To	Type	Fee	Ref.
24 August 2020	(Spain) Andoni López	Athletic Bilbao	Loan return		
24 August 2020	(Spain) Miguel San Román	Atlético Madrid B	Loan return		
26 August 2020	(Spain) Tekio	(Greece) Volos	Transfer	Free	
27 August 2020	(Spain) Iván Sánchez	(England) Birmingham City	Transfer	Free	
29 August 2020	(Brazil) Jonathas	(United Arab Emirates) Sharjah	Transfer	Free	
30 August 2020	(Spain) Juan Cruz	Osasuna	Transfer	€2.75M	
7 September 2020	(Spain) Óscar Gil	Espanyol	Transfer	€500K	
21 September 2020	(Spain) Manuel Sánchez	Real Ávila	Transfer	Free	
2 October 2020	(Spain) Claudio Medina	Burgos	Transfer	Free	
5 October 2020	(Spain) Ramón Folch	Tenerife	Loan		
1 February 2021	(Colombia) Jeison Lucumí	(Colombia) América de Cali	Transfer	Free	
1 February 2021	(Argentina) Juan Sánchez Miño	(Argentina) Estudiantes	Transfer	Free	
1 February 2021	(Mali) Youssouf Koné	(France) Lyon	Loan terminated		
1 February 2021	(Argentina) Diego Rodríguez	(Argentina) Defensa y Justicia	Loan terminated		

== Pre-season and friendlies ==
Win Draw Loss

12 September 2020 Friendly	Elche	2–0	UCAM Murcia	San Pedro del Pinatar, Spain
09:30 CEST (UTC+2)	Nino 21'; Medina 48'			Stadium: Pinatar Arena; Referee: Kevin Javier Moreno Muñoz

19 September 2020 Friendly	Elche	Cancelled	Atlético Baleares	San Pedro del Pinatar, Spain
10:00 CEST (UTC+2)				Stadium: Pinatar Arena

19 September 2020 Joan Gamper Trophy	Barcelona	1–0	Elche	Barcelona, Spain
19:00 CEST (UTC+2)	Griezmann 2'; Lenglet (yellow card) 58'		Moreno (yellow card) 84'	Stadium: Camp Nou; Referee: Carlos Calderiña Pavón

== Competitions ==
=== Overall record ===
Competition	First match	Last match	Starting round	Final position	Record							
Competition	First match	Last match	Starting round	Final position	Pld	W	D	L	GF	GA	GD	Win %
La Liga	26 September 2020	22 May 2021	Matchday 1	17th	38	8	12	18	34	55	−21	21.05
Copa del Rey	16 December 2020	16 January 2021	First round	Round of 32	3	2	0	1	3	3	+0	66.67
Total					41	10	12	19	37	58	−21	24.39

Source: Soccerway

=== La Liga ===
==== League table ====
Pos	Team	Pld	W	D	L	GF	GA	GD	Pts	Qualification or relegation
15	Getafe	38	9	11	18	28	43	−15	38	
16	Alavés	38	9	11	18	36	57	−21	38	
17	Elche	38	8	12	18	34	55	−21	36	
18	Huesca (R)	38	7	13	18	34	53	−19	34	Relegation to Segunda División
19	Valladolid (R)	38	5	16	17	34	57	−23	31	Relegation to Segunda División

Source: La Liga
Rules for classification: 1) Points; 2) Head-to-head points; 3) Head-to-head goal difference; 4) Goal difference; 5) Goals scored; 6) Fair-play points (Note: Head-to-head record is used only after all the matches between the teams in question have been played)
(R) Relegated

==== Results summary ====
Overall								Home						Away					
Pld	W	D	L	GF	GA	GD	Pts	W	D	L	GF	GA	GD	W	D	L	GF	GA	GD
38	8	12	18	34	55	−21	36	5	8	6	18	23	−5	3	4	12	16	32	−16

Source: La Liga

==== Results by round ====
Round	1	2	3	4	5	6	7	8	9	10	11	12	13	14	15	16	17	18	19	20	21	22	23	24	25	26	27	28	29	30	31	32	33	34	35	36	37	38
Ground	A	A	H	A	H	A	H	A	H	A	H	A	H	A	H	H	A	H	A	H	A	H	A	H	A	H	A	A	H	A	H	H	A	H	A	H	A	H
Result	L	L	L	W	D	W	W	L	D	D	D	D	L	L	D	D	L	L	D	L	L	D	L	W	L	W	L	D	D	L	D	W	L	L	L	L	W	W
Position	20	20	20	17	18	13	11	12	12	12	13	12	15	18	17	16	18	18	18	19	19	19	19	19	19	17	17	17	17	18	19	17	18	19	19	19	18	17

Source: La Liga
A = Away; H = Home; W = Win; D = Draw; L = Loss

==== Matches ====
The league fixtures were announced on 31 August 2020.

26 September 2020 3	Elche	0–3	Real Sociedad	Elche
18:30 CEST (UTC+2)	Mfulu (yellow card) 35'; Verdú (yellow card) 70'; Guti (yellow card) 87'	Report	Silva (yellow card) 43'; Portu 55'; Januzaj 77' (pen.); López 90+4'	Stadium: Estadio Manuel Martínez Valero; Attendance: 0 (Note: The match was played behind closed doors due to the COVID-19 pandemic in Spain.); Referee: Isidro Diaz de Mera Escuderos

30 September 2020 4	Eibar	0–1	Elche	Eibar
21:30 CEST (UTC+2)	Tejero (yellow card) 10'; Burgos (yellow card) 47'; Expósito (penalty missed) 52'	Report	Morente (yellow card) 28'; Boyé 37'; Josan (yellow card) 39'	Stadium: Ipurua; Attendance: 0 Referee: Santiago Jaime Latre

3 October 2020 5	Elche	0–0	Huesca	Elche
18:30 CEST (UTC+2)		Report	Insua (yellow card) 43'; Pulido (yellow card) 59'	Stadium: Estadio Manuel Martínez Valero; Attendance: 0 Referee: Mario Melero López

18 October 2020 6	Alavés	0–2	Elche	Vitoria-Gasteiz
18:30 CEST (UTC+2)	Lejeune (yellow card) 30'; Ely (yellow card) 67'	Report	Marcone (yellow card) 26'; Calvo (yellow card) 33'; Milla 39'; Morente (yellow card) 47', (goal) 86'; Josan (yellow card) 61'; Rigoni (yellow card) 78'	Stadium: Mendizorrotza; Attendance: 0 Referee: Adrián Cordero Vega

23 October 2020 7	Elche	2–1	Valencia	Elche
21:00 CEST (UTC+2)	Josan 19'; Fidel 37', (yellow card) 86'; Guti (yellow card) 77'; Barragán (yellow card) 90+3'	Report	Gabriel (yellow card) 45'; Lato 74', (yellow card) 90+5'	Stadium: Estadio Manuel Martínez Valero; Attendance: 0 Referee: César Soto Grado

1 November 2020 8	Real Betis	3–1	Elche	Seville
14:00 CET (UTC+1)	Sanabria 7', (yellow card) 64'; Tello 29', 56'; Fekir (penalty missed) 45+1', (yellow card) 51'	Report	Sánchez (yellow card) 41'; Josan 60'	Stadium: Estadio Benito Villamarín; Attendance: 0 Referee: David Medié Jiménez

6 November 2020 9	Elche	1–1	Celta Vigo	Elche
21:00 CET (UTC+1)	Fidel 4' (pen.); González (yellow card) 13'; Boyé (yellow card) 58'; Barragán (yellow card) 90+4'	Report	Suárez (yellow card) 5'; Mina 41'; Olaza (yellow card) 72'; Aspas (yellow card) 81'; Rodríguez (yellow card) 90+2'	Stadium: Estadio Manuel Martínez Valero; Attendance: 0 Referee: Ricardo de Burgos Bengoetxea

21 November 2020 10	Levante	1–1	Elche	Valencia
14:00 CET (UTC+1)	Melero 12'; Clerc (yellow card) 40'	Report	Boyé (yellow card) 39'; Morente 64', (yellow card) 67'; González (yellow card) 80'; Mfulu (yellow card) 88'	Stadium: Ciutat de València; Attendance: 0 Referee: Jorge Figueroa Vázquez

28 November 2020 11	Elche	1–1	Cádiz	Elche
14:00 CET (UTC+1)	Gonzalo (yellow card) 12'; Boyé (yellow card) 12' (yellow-red card) 45+4', (goal) 38'; Milla (yellow card) 60'; Marcone (yellow card) 64'; Morente (yellow card) 90+4'	Report	Fernández (yellow card) 54'; Giménez 55'; Jønsson (yellow card) 68'	Stadium: Estadio Manuel Martínez Valero; Attendance: 0 Referee: Carlos del Cerro Grande

6 December 2020 12	Villarreal	0–0	Elche	Villarreal
18:30 CET (UTC+1)	Parejo (yellow card) 64'; Albiol (yellow card) 75'; Coquelin (yellow card) 81'	Report	Milla (yellow card) 23'; Fidel (yellow card) 67'	Stadium: Estadio de la Cerámica; Attendance: 0 Referee: Santiago Jaime Latre

13 December 2020 13	Elche	0–1	Granada	Elche
18:30 CET (UTC+1)	Josema (yellow card) 10'; Sánchez (yellow card) 48'; González (yellow card) 73'; Barragán (yellow card) 90+3'	Report	Suárez 42'; Gonalons (yellow card) 86'; Puertas (yellow card) 90+4'	Stadium: Estadio Manuel Martínez Valero; Attendance: 0 Referee: Pablo González Fuertes

19 December 2020 14	Atlético Madrid	3–1	Elche	Madrid
14:00 CET (UTC+1)	Hermoso (yellow card) 40'; Suárez 41', 58'; Costa 80' (pen.)	Report	Gonzalo (yellow card) 14'; Boyé 64'; Marcone (yellow card) 79'	Stadium: Wanda Metropolitano; Attendance: 0 Referee: Xavier Estrada Fernández

22 December 2020 15	Elche	2–2	Osasuna	Elche
17:30 CET (UTC+1)	Fidel 46'; Carrillo 78', (yellow card) 84'	Report	R. García 10'; Brašanac 64'; Pérez (yellow card) 73' (yellow-red card) 90+2'	Stadium: Estadio Manuel Martínez Valero; Attendance: 0 Referee: Ricardo de Burgos Bengoetxea

30 December 2020 16	Elche	1–1	Real Madrid	Elche
21:30 CET (UTC+1)	Fidel 52' (pen.); Gonzalo (yellow card) 73'	Report	Modrić 20'; Ramos (yellow card) 21'; Casemiro (yellow card) 60'; Carvajal (yellow card) 66'; Kroos (yellow card) 71'	Stadium: Estadio Manuel Martínez Valero; Attendance: 0 Referee: Jorge Figueroa Vázquez

3 January 2021 17	Athletic Bilbao	1–0	Elche	Bilbao
14:00 CET (UTC+1)	Muniain 25'; Vencedor (yellow card) 36'; Berchiche (yellow card) 50'	Report	Barragán (yellow card) 44'	Stadium: San Mamés; Attendance: 0 Referee: Mario Melero López

11 January 2021 18	Elche	1–3	Getafe	Elche
19:00 CET (UTC+1)	Guti 4'; Marcone (yellow card) 44' (yellow-red card) 52'; Nino (yellow card) 78'; Rigoni (yellow card) 82'	Report	Suárez (yellow card) 31'; Cucurella 39'; Mata 69'; Aleñá (yellow card) 74'; Ángel 86' (pen.)	Stadium: Estadio Manuel Martínez Valero; Attendance: 0 Referee: José Luis Munuera Montero
Note: Match originally scheduled for 10 January 2021, but postponed due to a storm.

19 January 2021 19	Valladolid	2–2	Elche	Valladolid
19:00 CET (UTC+1)	Fede (yellow card) 39'; Míchel 71'; Joaquín 89'; Mesa (red card) 90+1'	Report	Josan 9', 43'; Josema (yellow card) 51'; Cifu (yellow card) 85'; Milla (yellow card) 90+4'	Stadium: José Zorrilla; Attendance: 0 Referee: Santiago Jaime Latre

24 January 2021 20	Elche	0–2	Barcelona	Elche
16:15 CET (UTC+1)		Report	De Jong 39'; Busquets (yellow card) 68'; Griezmann (yellow card) 84'; Puig 89'	Stadium: Martínez Valero; Attendance: 0 Referee: Valentín Pizarro Gómez

30 January 2021 21	Valencia	1–0	Elche	Valencia
18:30 CET (UTC+1)	Wass 22', (yellow card) 70'; Soler (penalty missed) 34'	Report	Gonzalo (yellow card) 3'; Barragán (yellow card) 33'; Morente (yellow card) 42'; Marcone (yellow card) 48'; González (yellow card) 65'; Rigoni (yellow card) 74'; Rodríguez (yellow card) 90+1'	Stadium: Mestalla; Attendance: 0 Referee: Pablo González Fuertes

6 February 2021 22	Elche	2–2	Villarreal	Elche
18:30 CET (UTC+1)	Boyé (yellow card) 22', (goal) 64'; Carrillo 49'	Report	Gerard 16', 35'; Pedraza (yellow card) 62'; Trigueros (yellow card) 70'	Stadium: Martínez Valero; Attendance: 0 Referee: Mario Melero López

12 February 2021 23	Celta Vigo	3–1	Elche	Vigo
21:00 CET (UTC+1)	Mina 45', 69'; Méndez 45+2', (yellow card) 53'; Ferreyra (yellow card) 78'; Aspas (yellow card) 82'	Report	Rigoni (yellow card) 36', (goal) 50'; Gonzalo (yellow card) 82'	Stadium: Balaídos; Attendance: 0 Referee: Ricardo de Burgos Bengoetxea

20 February 2021 24	Elche	1–0	Eibar	Elche
14:00 CET (UTC+1)	Calvo 33'; Gonzalo (yellow card) 42'; Marcone (yellow card) 53'	Report	Gil (yellow card) 90+2'	Stadium: Martínez Valero; Attendance: 0 Referee: Adrián Cordero Vega

24 February 2021 1	Barcelona	3–0	Elche	Barcelona
19:00 CET (UTC+1)	Messi 48', 68'; Alba 73'	Report		Stadium: Camp Nou; Attendance: 0 Referee: Isidro Díaz de Mera Escuderos
Note: Match originally scheduled for 13 September 2020, but postponed due to the delayed conclusion of last season's UEFA club competitions.

28 February 2021 25	Granada	2–1	Elche	Granada
18:30 CET (UTC+1)	Pérez (yellow card) 24'; Quina 31'; Molina (yellow card) 47'; Puertas 79'; Díaz (yellow card) 90+3'	Report	Mojica (yellow card) 34'; Boyé 40'; Josema (yellow card) 72'	Stadium: Nuevo Los Cármenes; Attendance: 0 Referee: Santiago Jaime Latre

6 March 2021 26	Elche	2–1	Sevilla	Elche
16:15 CET (UTC+1)	Marcone (yellow card) 2'; Boyé (yellow card) 47'; Barragán (yellow card) 64'; Guti 70'; Carrillo 76'; Fidel (yellow card) 90+2'	Report	De Jong 90'	Stadium: Martínez Valero; Attendance: 0 Referee: Valentín Pizarro Gómez

13 March 2021 27	Real Madrid	2–1	Elche	Madrid
16:15 CET (UTC+1)	Benzema (yellow card) 37', (goal) 73', 90+1'	Report	Calvo 61'; Carrillo (yellow card) 69'	Stadium: Alfredo Di Stéfano; Attendance: 0 Referee: Jorge Figueroa Vázquez

17 March 2021 2	Sevilla	2–0	Elche	Seville
19:00 CET (UTC+1)	Gómez (yellow card) 10'; Óscar (yellow card) 39'; En-Nesyri 43'; Vázquez 89'	Report	Mojica (yellow card) 78'	Stadium: Ramón Sánchez Pizjuán; Attendance: 0 Referee: Javier Alberola Rojas
Note: Match originally scheduled for 20 September 2020, but postponed due to the delayed conclusion of last season's UEFA club competitions.

21 March 2021 28	Getafe	1–1	Elche	Getafe
14:00 CET (UTC+1)	Arambarri (yellow card) 25'; Chakla (yellow card) 45+5'; Ünal 61'; Ángel (penalty missed) 84'; Timor (yellow card) 90+7'	Report	Milla 20', (yellow card) 63'; Marcone (yellow card) 37'; Boyé (yellow card) 45+5'; Calvo (yellow card) 55'; Carrillo (yellow card) 66'; Fidel (yellow card) 68'; Gonzalo (yellow card) 83'	Stadium: Coliseum Alfonso Pérez; Attendance: 0 Referee: Alejandro Hernández Hernández

4 April 2021 29	Elche	1–1	Real Betis	Elche
16:15 CEST (UTC+2)	Milla 36'; Guti (yellow card) 73'	Report	Iglesias 14' (pen.); Carvalho (yellow card) 19'; Ruiz (yellow card) 47'; Ruibal (yellow card) 67'; Rodríguez (yellow card) 90+2'	Stadium: Martínez Valero; Attendance: 0 Referee: Adrián Cordero Vega

9 April 2021 30	Huesca	3–1	Elche	Huesca
21:00 CEST (UTC+2)	Mir 3', 88' (pen.); Sandro 30'; Gómez (yellow card) 60'; Ferreiro (yellow card) 71'	Report	Vavro 4' (o.g.); Fidel (yellow card) 52'; Gonzalo (yellow card) 90+3'	Stadium: El Alcoraz; Attendance: 0 Referee: Javier Alberola Rojas

18 April 2021 33	Osasuna	2–0	Elche	Pamplona
14:00 CEST (UTC+2)	Barja 38'; Vidal (yellow card) 45'; Sánchez (yellow card) 48'; González 68' (o.g.)	Report	Boyé (yellow card) 8'	Stadium: El Sadar; Attendance: 0 Referee: Jorge Figueroa Vázquez
Note: The match was originally scheduled for 28 April 2021, but was brought forward by La Liga.

21 April 2021 31	Elche	1–1	Valladolid	Elche
21:00 CEST (UTC+2)	Fidel 22'; Milla (yellow card) 26'; Marcone (yellow card) 37'; Calvo (yellow card) 72'; Gonzalo (yellow card) 84'; Rigoni (yellow card) 90+2'	Report	Kodro (yellow card) 12'; Joaquín (yellow card) 52'; Janko (yellow card) 67'; Olaza 86'	Stadium: Martínez Valero; Attendance: 0 Referee: José María Sánchez Martínez

24 April 2021 32	Elche	1–0	Levante	Elche
14:00 CEST (UTC+2)	Boyé 32'; Mojica (yellow card) 34'; Fidel (yellow card) 77'; Gazzaniga (yellow card) 79'	Report	Postigo (yellow card) 59'; Malsa (yellow card) 65'; Roger (yellow card) 74'; Bardhi (yellow card) 90+3'	Stadium: Martínez Valero; Attendance: 0 Referee: David Medié Jiménez

1 May 2021 34	Elche	0–1	Atlético Madrid	Elche
16:15 CEST (UTC+2)	Milla (yellow card) 69'; Boyé (yellow card) 75'; Barragán (yellow card) 76'; Fidel (penalty missed) 90+1'	Report	Llorente 23'; Lemar (yellow card) 36'; Carrasco (yellow card) 41'	Stadium: Martínez Valero; Attendance: 0 Referee: Mario Melero López

7 May 2021 35	Real Sociedad	2–0	Elche	San Sebastián
21:00 CEST (UTC+2)	Guevara (yellow card) 36'; Elustondo 72'; Oyarzabal 90+2'	Report	Guti (red card) 11'; Gazzaniga (yellow card) 11'; Fidel (yellow card) 12'; Barragán (yellow card) 24'	Stadium: Anoeta; Attendance: 0 Referee: Adrián Cordero Vega

11 May 2021 36	Elche	0–2	Alavés	Elche
20:00 CEST (UTC+2)	Mfulu (yellow card) 13'; Gazzaniga (yellow card) 90+3'	Report	Méndez (yellow card) 2'; Joselu 40'; Rioja 54'; Tachi (yellow card) 67'; Pina (yellow card) 85'; Deyverson (yellow card) 90+3'	Stadium: Martínez Valero; Attendance: 0 Referee: Pablo González Fuertes

16 May 2021 37	Cádiz	1–3	Elche	Cádiz
18:30 CEST (UTC+2)	José Mari 15' (pen.); Alejo (yellow card) 66'; Lozano (yellow card) 90+1'; Fali (yellow card) 90+3'	Report	Gonzalo (yellow card) 15'; Josan (yellow card) 53'; Milla 58'; González 64', (yellow card) 76'; Fidel (yellow card) 73', (goal) 88'	Stadium: Ramón de Carranza; Attendance: 0 Referee: César Soto Grado

22 May 2021 38	Elche	2–0	Athletic Bilbao	Elche
18:00 CEST (UTC+2)	Boyé 28'; Mfulu (yellow card) 33'; Piatti (yellow card) 58'; Guti 73', (yellow card) 74'	Report		Stadium: Martínez Valero; Attendance: 0 Referee: Carlos del Cerro Grande

=== Copa del Rey ===
16 December 2020 First round	Buñol	1–2	Elche	Buñol (Note: Buñol did not play its game in its main stadium Beltrán Báguena, in Buñol, as it does not meet the requirements to broadcast the match.)
21:00 CET (UTC+1)	Calvo 12' (o.g.); Valero (yellow card) 36'; Paco (yellow card) 56'	Report	Nino 66'; Rigoni 72'	Stadium: Ciudad Deportiva Levante UD; Referee: Mario Melero López

6 January 2021 Second round	La Nucía	0–1	Elche	La Nucía
12:00 CET (UTC+1)		Report	Luismi (yellow card) 31'; Boyé 46'	Stadium: Camilo Cano; Referee: David Medié Jiménez

16 January 2021 Round of 32	Rayo Vallecano	2–0	Elche	Las Rozas (Note: Given the impossibility of being able to play the match at the Vallecas stadium in Madrid due to the consequences of the “Filomena” storm.)
22:00 CET (UTC+1)	Bebé 36'; Isi (yellow card) 75'; Catena 78'	Report	Nino (yellow card) 39'; Lucumí (yellow card) 71'	Stadium: La Ciudad del Fútbol; Referee: Isidro Díaz de Mera Escuderos

== Statistics ==
=== Goalscorers ===
As of 12 February 2021

Rank	No.	Pos	Nat	Name	La Liga	Copa del Rey	Total
1	9	FW	(Argentina)	Lucas Boyé	4	1	5
2	16	MF	(Spain)	Fidel	4	0	4
2	17	MF	(Spain)	Josan	4	0	4
4	11	MF	(Spain)	Tete Morente	2	0	2
4	21	FW	(Argentina)	Guido Carrillo	2	0	2
4	22	FW	(Argentina)	Emiliano Rigoni	1	1	2
7	7	FW	(Spain)	Nino	0	1	1
7	10	MF	(Spain)	Pere Milla	1	0	1
7	14	MF	(Spain)	Raúl Guti	1	0	1
Totals					19	3	22
