= Daniel Pinillos =

Spanish footballer

Dani Pinillos
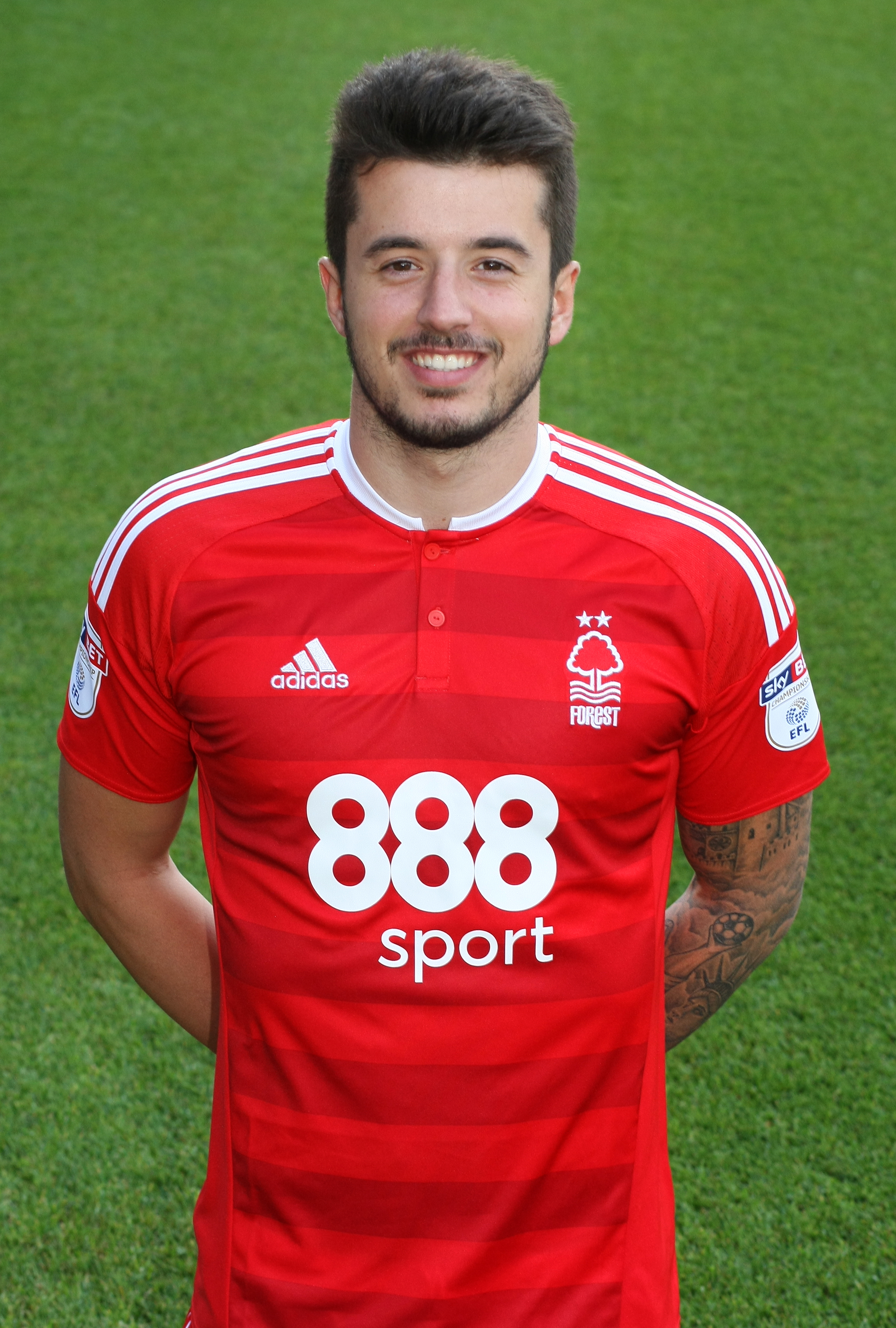
- Pinillos with Nottingham Forest in 2016

Personal information
- Full name: Daniel Pinillos González
- Date of birth: 22 October 1992 (age 34)
- Place of birth: Logroño, Spain
- Height: 1.82 m (6 ft 0 in)
- Position: Left-back

Youth career
- Logroñés

Senior career*
Years	Team	Apps	(Gls)
2010–2013	Racing Santander B	52	(0)
2013–2014	Ourense	21	(0)
2014	Córdoba B	6	(0)
2014–2015	Córdoba	28	(1)
2015–2017	Nottingham Forest	35	(1)
2017–2018	Córdoba	16	(0)
2018–2020	Barnsley	47	(0)
2020–2021	Miedź Legnica	23	(0)
2021–2022	Logroñés	22	(0)
2022–2023	Rayo Majadahonda	33	(0)
2023–2024	Recreativo	13	(0)
- * Club domestic league appearances and goals as of 25 May 2024

Daniel "Dani" Pinillos González (born 22 October 1992) is a Spanish professional footballer who plays as a left-back.

== Club career ==
=== Early career ===
Born in Logroño, La Rioja, Pinillos graduated from local UD Logroñés' youth system, and joined Racing de Santander in July 2010. He made his senior debuts with the latter's B-team in the 2010–11 season, being relegated from Segunda División B.

On 9 July 2013, Pinillos signed for CD Ourense, also in the third level. He appeared regularly for the side, contributing with 21 appearances.

=== Córdoba ===
On 30 January 2014, Pinillos moved to fellow league club Córdoba CF B, and played his first official game with the main squad on 2 March, starting in a 1–0 away win against Girona FC in the Segunda División championship. On 18 July, after appearing in 16 matches during the campaign, he renewed his link with the Andalusians for three years, being definitely promoted to the first team now in La Liga.

Pinillos made his debut in the main category of Spanish football on 25 August 2014, starting and being booked in a 0–2 loss at Real Madrid. On 22 March of the following year, he was sent off in the dying minutes of a 1–3 away loss against Real Sociedad after offending the assistant referee, being later handed a four-match ban. On 11 June, after suffering relegation, Pinillos was released by the Verdiblancos.

=== Nottingham Forest ===
In July 2015, Pinillos went on a trial at English Football League Championship club Nottingham Forest, and agreed to a two-year contract with the club on 30 July. He made his Forest debut on 22 August in a 1–1 draw at Bolton Wanderers, and quickly established himself as the club's first-choice left-back. On Saturday 19 December, Pinillos ruptured his anterior cruciate knee ligaments in Forest's 2–1 win over MK Dons and missed the rest of the season through injury.

Pinillos finally made his first-team return for Forest on 19 November 2016, starting at left wing-back as his club defeated Ipswich Town 2–0 at Portman Road. Before Forest played their next match, however, the club disclosed that Pinillos required surgery on his other knee due to a meniscus injury that was expected to sideline him for "several weeks".

On 18 March 2017, Pinillos scored his first goal for the club, netting a last-minute headed equaliser against fierce rivals Derby County from a Ben Osborn corner, levelling the match at 2–2. Pinillos had also assisted Forest's first goal that day, with an outstanding cross for the on-rushing Zach Clough to tap in. On 15 May 2017, Forest manager Mark Warburton confirmed that Pinillos would leave the club at the end of his contract on 30 June.

=== Córdoba return ===
On 2 July 2017, Pinillos returned to his previous club Córdoba, after agreeing to a three-year deal. He immediately became a first-team regular for the side, featuring ahead of fellow new signing Javi Noblejas.

=== Barnsley ===
On 19 January 2018, Pinillos signed for Barnsley on a 2 1/2-year contract.

=== Miedź Legnica ===
On 29 September 2020, he joined Polish club Miedź Legnica on a one-year contract with an extension option. He made 23 second-tier appearances during his one-year stint at the club.

=== UD Logroñés ===
On 30 August 2021 he signed for newly-relegated Third Division side UD Logroñés.

== Career statistics ==
As of match played 21 September 2019

Appearances and goals by club, season and competition
Club	Season	League			National Cup		League Cup		Other		Total	
Club	Season	Division	Apps	Goals	Apps	Goals	Apps	Goals	Apps	Goals	Apps	Goals
Racing Santander B	2010–11	Tercera División	15	0	—		—		0	0	15	0
Racing Santander B	2011–12	Tercera División	15	0	—		—		0	0	15	0
Racing Santander B	2012–13	Segunda División B	22	0	—		—		—		22	0
Racing Santander B	Total		52	0	—		—		—		52	0
Ourense	2013–14	Segunda División B	21	0	0	0	—		—		21	0
Córdoba B	2013–14	Segunda División B	6	0	—		—		—		6	0
Córdoba	2013–14	Segunda División	12	1	—		—		4	0	16	1
Córdoba	2014–15	La Liga	12	0	1	0	—		—		13	0
Córdoba	Total		24	1	1	0	—		4	0	29	1
Nottingham Forest	2015–16	Championship	19	0	0	0	0	0	—		19	0
Nottingham Forest	2016–17	Championship	16	1	0	0	0	0	—		16	1
Nottingham Forest	Total		35	1	0	0	0	0	—		35	1
Córdoba	2017–18	Segunda División	16	0	0	0	—		—		16	0
Barnsley	2017–18	Championship	8	0	0	0	0	0	—		8	0
Barnsley	2018–19	League One	35	0	1	0	1	0	2	0	39	0
Barnsley	2019–20	Championship	4	0	0	0	1	0	—		5	0
Barnsley	Total		47	0	1	0	2	0	2	0	52	0
Career total			201	2	2	0	2	0	6	0	211	2

== Honours ==
=== Club ===
Barnsley

- EFL League One runner-up: 2018–19
