= Álex López (footballer, born 2005) =

Spanish footballer (born 2005)

Personal information
- Full name: Alejandro López Cañero
- Date of birth: 12 August 2005 (age 21)
- Place of birth: Montemayor, Spain
- Height: 1.90 m (6 ft 3 in)
- Position: Left-back

Team information
- Current team: Córdoba B
- Number: 5

Youth career
- Stadium Fernán Núñez
- 2016–2023: Córdoba

Senior career*
Years	Team	Apps	(Gls)
2023–	Córdoba B	18	(0)
2024–	Córdoba	5	(0)
- * Club domestic league appearances and goals as of 1 June 2025

Alejandro "Álex" López Cañero (born 12 August 2005) is a Spanish footballer who plays for Córdoba CF B. Mainly a left-back, he can also play as a left winger.

== Club career ==
Born in Montemayor, Córdoba, Andalusia, López joined Córdoba CF's youth sides in 2016, from CD Stadium Fernán Núñez. On 24 July 2023, while still a youth, he renewed his contract until 2025.

López made his senior debut with the reserves on 10 September 2023, coming on as a second-half substitute in a 1–0 Tercera Federación home loss to Xerez CD. He made his first team debut on 12 November, replacing Cristian Carracedo late into a 3–3 Primera Federación home draw against AD Ceuta FC; aged 18 years and 92 days, he became the fifth-youngest to debut with the club in the 21st century.

On 15 January 2024, López was definitely promoted to the B-side, and featured in two further matches with the main squad during the campaign as they achieved promotion to Segunda División. He made his professional debut on 6 October, starting in a 1–1 away draw against Albacete Balompié.

On 13 June 2025, despite nursing a knee injury suffered in February, López renewed his contract with the Blanquiverdes until 2027.

== International career ==
On 29 December 2023, López was included in the preliminary list of the Spain national under-19 team.
