= Josema (footballer, born 1996) =

Spanish footballer

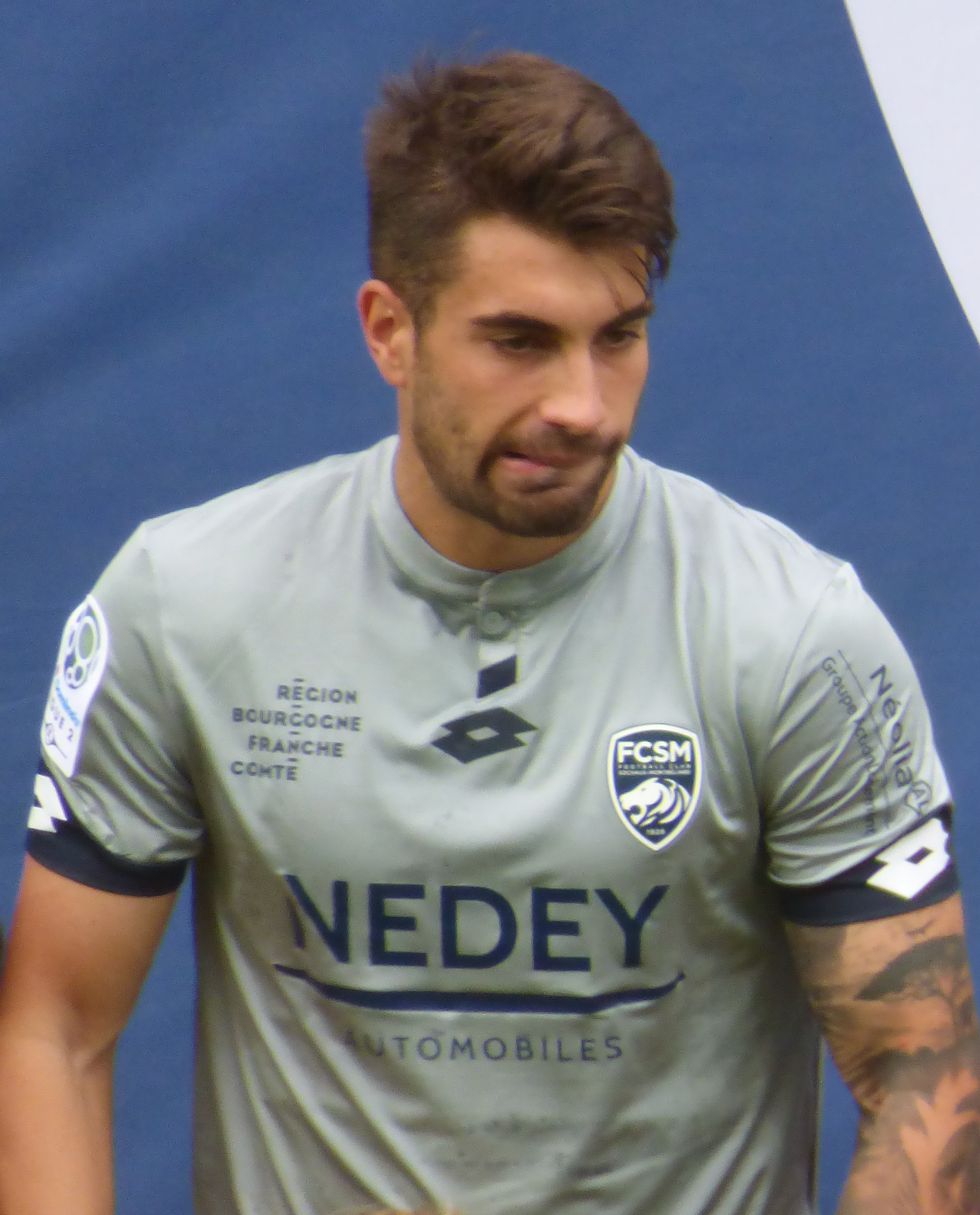
- Josema with Sochaux in 2018

Personal information
- Full name: José Manuel Sánchez Guillén
- Date of birth: 6 June 1996 (age 30)
- Place of birth: Lorquí, Spain
- Height: 1.82 m (6 ft 0 in)
- Position: Defender

Team information
- Current team: Górnik Zabrze
- Number: 20

Youth career
- 2001–2009: Lorquí
- 2009–2010: Nueva Vanguardia
- 2010–2015: Almería

Senior career*
| Years | Team | Apps | (Gls) |
| 2015–2017 | Almería B | 40 | (1) |
| 2016–2017 | Almería | 0 | (0) |
| 2017 | → Murcia (loan) | 15 | (3) |
| 2017–2019 | Córdoba | 12 | (0) |
| 2018 | → Sochaux (loan) | 12 | (1) |
| 2019 | → Gimnàstic (loan) | 4 | (0) |
| 2019–2020 | Extremadura | 0 | (0) |
| 2020–2022 | Elche | 47 | (0) |
| 2022 | → Valladolid (loan) | 5 | (0) |
| 2022–2024 | Leganés | 25 | (0) |
| 2024 | Ruch Chorzów | 15 | (1) |
| 2024– | Górnik Zabrze | 59 | (4) |

International career
| 2012 | Spain U17 | 2 | (0) |
- * Club domestic league appearances and goals as of 11:19, 31 August 2026 (UTC)

José Manuel Sánchez Guillén (born 6 June 1996), commonly known as Josema, is a Spanish professional footballer for Polish club Górnik Zabrze. Mainly a central defender, he can also play as a left back.

== Club career ==
Born in Lorquí, Murcia, Josema joined UD Almería's youth setup in 2010, aged 14, after stints at ADM Lorquí and Nueva Vanguardia CF. On 14 July 2015, he was promoted to the former's reserves in Segunda División B.

Josema made his senior debut on 23 August 2015, starting in a 0–0 away draw against FC Jumilla. He scored his first goal on 15 May of the following year, netting his team's third in a 3–3 draw at Mérida AD, as his side was already relegated.

On 6 September 2016, Josema made his first team debut, starting in a 2–0 Copa del Rey home loss against Rayo Vallecano. The following 11 January, he was loaned to Real Murcia until June.

On 2 July 2017, Josema signed a three-year contract with Córdoba CF, for a fee of €500,000. He made his Segunda División debut on 19 August, starting in a 2–1 home loss against Cádiz CF.

On 20 June 2018, after featuring sparingly, Josema was loaned to Ligue 2 side FC Sochaux-Montbéliard for one year, with a buyout clause. His loan was terminated on 29 December, and he moved to Gimnàstic de Tarragona the following 31 January, also in a temporary deal.

On 15 June 2019, after both his loan and parent club suffered relegation, Josema terminated his contract with Córdoba, and signed for Extremadura UD exactly one month later. The following 17 January, he cut ties with the latter, and moved to fellow second division side Elche CF fourteen days later.

On 2 July 2020, after beginning to feature regularly under Pacheta, he agreed to a contract extension until 2022. He contributed with 16 appearances as his side achieved promotion to La Liga.

Josema made his debut in the main category of Spanish football on 26 September 2020, starting in a 3–0 home loss against Real Sociedad. Still a regular starter under new manager Jorge Almirón, he further extended his contract until 2023 on 14 October.

Josema lost his starting spot to new signing Enzo Roco in 2021, and was loaned to second division side Real Valladolid for the remainder of the season on 26 January 2022. On 12 August, he signed a two-year deal with CD Leganés also in the second tier.

On 1 February 2024, after failing to feature in any league matches during the first half of the campaign, Josema terminated his contract with Lega. Just hours later, he joined Polish Ekstraklasa club Ruch Chorzów on a six-month deal, with an option for another year.

After Ruch's relegation to the I liga, Josema joined their local rivals Górnik Zabrze on 20 June 2024, signing a two-year contract.

== Career statistics ==
As of match played 23 May 2026

Appearances and goals by club, season and competition
| Club | Season | League | | | National cup (Note: Includes Copa del Rey, Coupe de France, Polish Cup) | | League cup (Note: Includes Coupe de la Ligue) | | Europe | | Other | | Total | |
| Club | Season | Division | Apps | Goals | Apps | Goals | Apps | Goals | Apps | Goals | Apps | Goals | Apps | Goals |
|---|---|---|---|---|---|---|---|---|---|---|---|---|---|---|
| Almería B | 2015–16 | Segunda División B | 36 | 1 | — | | — | | — | | — | | 36 | 1 |
| Almería B | 2016–17 | Tercera División | 4 | 0 | — | | — | | — | | — | | 4 | 0 |
| Almería B | Total | | 40 | 1 | — | | — | | — | | — | | 40 | 1 |
| Almería | 2015–16 | Segunda División | 0 | 0 | 0 | 0 | — | | — | | — | | 0 | 0 |
| Almería | 2016–17 | Segunda División | 0 | 0 | 1 | 0 | — | | — | | — | | 1 | 0 |
| Almería | Total | | 0 | 0 | 1 | 0 | — | | — | | — | | 1 | 0 |
| Murcia (loan) | 2016–17 | Segunda División B | 15 | 3 | 0 | 0 | — | | — | | 4 (Note: Appearances in promotion play-offs) | 0 | 19 | 3 |
| Córdoba | 2017–18 | Segunda División | 12 | 0 | 1 | 0 | — | | — | | — | | 13 | 0 |
| Sochaux (loan) | 2018–19 | Ligue 2 | 12 | 1 | 2 | 0 | 1 | 0 | — | | — | | 15 | 1 |
| Gimnàstic (loan) | 2018–19 | Segunda División | 4 | 0 | 0 | 0 | — | | — | | — | | 4 | 0 |
| Extremadura | 2019–20 | Segunda División | 0 | 0 | 1 | 0 | — | | — | | — | | 1 | 0 |
| Elche | 2019–20 | Segunda División | 12 | 0 | 0 | 0 | — | | — | | 4 | 0 | 16 | 0 |
| Elche | 2020–21 | La Liga | 29 | 0 | 0 | 0 | — | | — | | — | | 29 | 0 |
| Elche | 2021–22 | La Liga | 6 | 0 | 2 | 0 | — | | — | | — | | 8 | 0 |
| Elche | Total | | 47 | 0 | 2 | 0 | — | | — | | 4 | 0 | 53 | 0 |
| Valladolid (loan) | 2021–22 | Segunda División | 5 | 0 | — | | — | | — | | — | | 5 | 0 |
| Leganés | 2022–23 | Segunda División | 25 | 0 | 1 | 0 | — | | — | | — | | 26 | 0 |
| Leganés | 2022–23 | Segunda División | 0 | 0 | 2 | 0 | — | | — | | — | | 2 | 0 |
| Leganés | Total | | 25 | 0 | 3 | 0 | — | | — | | — | | 28 | 0 |
| Ruch Chorzów | 2023–24 | Ekstraklasa | 15 | 1 | — | | — | | — | | — | | 15 | 1 |
| Górnik Zabrze | 2024–25 | Ekstraklasa | 25 | 3 | 1 | 0 | — | | — | | — | | 26 | 3 |
| Górnik Zabrze | 2025–26 | Ekstraklasa | 31 | 0 | 5 | 0 | — | | — | | — | | 36 | 0 |
| Górnik Zabrze | 2026–27 | Ekstraklasa | 2 | 0 | 0 | 0 | — | | 6 (Note: Two appearances in UEFA Champions League, two appearances in UEFA Europa League, two appearances in UEFA Conference League) | 0 | 1 (Note: Appearance in Polish Super Cup) | 0 | 9 | 0 |
| Górnik Zabrze | Total | | 58 | 3 | 6 | 0 | — | | 6 | 0 | 1 | 0 | 71 | 3 |
| Career total | | | 233 | 9 | 16 | 0 | 1 | 0 | 6 | 0 | 9 | 0 | 265 | 9 |

== Honours ==
Górnik Zabrze

- Polish Cup: 2025–26
