= Abel Moreno =

Spanish footballer

Personal information
- Full name: Abel Moreno Zorrero
- Date of birth: 19 February 1995 (age 31)
- Place of birth: Almensilla, Spain
- Height: 1.80 m (5 ft 11 in)
- Position: Left back

Team information
- Current team: Gerena
- Number: 18

Youth career
- Sevilla

Senior career*
Years	Team	Apps	(Gls)
2014–2015	Sevilla C	34	(3)
2015–2016	Córdoba B	20	(0)
2015–2017	Córdoba	13	(0)
2016–2017	→ Ponferradina (loan)	17	(1)
2017–2018	Zaragoza B	28	(2)
2018–2019	Linense	15	(0)
2019–2020	Ebro	10	(0)
2020	Villarrobledo	6	(0)
2020–	Gerena	3	(0)
- * Club domestic league appearances and goals as of 16:43, 17 November 2020 (UTC)

Abel Moreno Zorrero (born 19 February 1995) is a Spanish footballer who plays for CD Gerena as a left back.

== Club career ==
Born in Almensilla, Seville, Andalusia, Moreno finished his formation with Sevilla FC, and made his debuts as a senior with the C-team in the 2014–15 campaign, in Tercera División. On 7 July 2015 he moved to neighbouring Córdoba CF, being assigned to the reserves also in the fourth tier.

On 9 September 2015 Moreno made his professional debut, starting in a 0–1 home loss against CD Lugo, for the season's Copa del Rey. He made his Segunda División debut on 29 November, playing the full 90 minutes in a 2–1 home win against Real Oviedo.

On 13 July 2016, Moreno was loaned to SD Ponferradina in Segunda División B. Roughly one year later he signed for another reserve team, Deportivo Aragón also in the third division.
