= Marcelo Timorán =

Bolivian footballer (born 2006)

Personal information
- Full name: Marcelo Stephano Timorán Paz
- Date of birth: 8 July 2006 (age 20)
- Place of birth: Oruro, Bolivia
- Height: 1.75 m (5 ft 9 in)
- Position: Left-back

Team information
- Current team: Córdoba B
- Number: 20

Youth career
- 2019–2022: Osuna Bote
- 2022–2024: Séneca
- 2024–2025: Córdoba

Senior career*
Years	Team	Apps	(Gls)
2025–	Córdoba B	6	(0)
2025–	Córdoba	1	(0)

International career^{‡}
2025–	Bolivia	1	(0)
- * Club domestic league appearances and goals as of 17:22, 11 October 2025 (UTC) ‡ National team caps and goals as of 22:11, 10 October 2025 (UTC)

Marcelo Stephano Timorán Paz (born 8 July 2006) is a Bolivian footballer who plays for Spanish club Córdoba CF B and the Bolivia national team. Mainly a left-back, he can also play as a left winger.

== Club career ==
Born in Oruro, Timorán moved to Gilena, Andalusia at the age of 12, and joined the youth sides of Osuna Bote Club a year later. He later represented Séneca CF before moving to Córdoba CF's youth sides in 2024.

Timorán made his senior debut with the reserves on 22 February 2025, coming on as a late substitute in a 2–2 Tercera Federación home draw against Sevilla FC C. On 30 September, he renewed his contract until 2028.

Timorán made his first team debut with the Blanquiverdes on 5 October 2025, replacing Ignasi Vilarrasa in a 1–0 Segunda División away win over Real Zaragoza.

== International career ==
Born in Bolivia to Peruvian parents, Timorán was called up to the former's full side on 3 October 2025, for two friendlies against Jordan and Russia.

== Career statistics ==
=== Club ===
As of match played 5 October 2025

Appearances and goals by club, season and competition
Club	Season	League			Cup		Europe		Other		Total	
Club	Season	Division	Apps	Goals	Apps	Goals	Apps	Goals	Apps	Goals	Apps	Goals
Córdoba	2025–26	Segunda División	1	0	1	0	—		—		2	0
Career total			1	0	1	0	0	0	0	0	2	0

=== International ===
As of matches played 10 October 2025

Appearances and goals by national team and year
National team	Year	Apps	Goals
Bolivia	2025	1	0
Total		1	0
