= Javi Antrás =

Spanish footballer (born 2007)

Personal information
- Full name: Javier Antrás Santos
- Date of birth: 21 January 2007 (age 19)
- Place of birth: Lucena, Spain
- Position: Midfielder

Team information
- Current team: Córdoba B
- Number: 28

Youth career
- Fundación Lucena
- 2022–2026: Córdoba

Senior career*
Years	Team	Apps	(Gls)
2024–	Córdoba B	48	(4)
2026–	Córdoba	1	(0)
- * Club domestic league appearances and goals as of 31 May 2026

Javier "Javi" Antrás Santos (born 21 January 2007) is a Spanish footballer who plays as a midfielder for Córdoba CF B.

== Career ==
Born in Lucena, Córdoba, Andalusia, Antrás joined Córdoba CF's youth sides in 2022, from Fundación Lucena CF. He made his senior debut with the reserves on 21 January 2024, playing the last 13 minutes of a 3–0 Tercera Federación away loss to Xerez Deportivo FC, and signed a professional contract on 6 March.

On 8 October 2025, Antrás further extended his link with the Blanquiverdes. He made his first team debut the following 31 May, coming on as a late substitute for Sergi Guardiola in a 1–1 Segunda División home draw against SD Huesca.
