= Esteve Monterde =

Spanish footballer (born 1995)

Personal information
- Full name: Esteve Monterde Torrents
- Date of birth: 29 October 1995 (age 31)
- Place of birth: Badalona, Spain
- Height: 1.80 m (5 ft 11 in)
- Position: Midfielder

Team information
- Current team: Cerdanyola del Vallès

Youth career
- Gramenet
- 2013–2014: Badalona

Senior career*
| Years | Team | Apps | (Gls) |
| 2013 | Gramenet | 1 | (0) |
| 2014–2015 | Badalona | 16 | (1) |
| 2015–2018 | Córdoba B | 84 | (3) |
| 2016–2018 | Córdoba | 7 | (0) |
| 2018–2019 | Cornellà | 2 | (0) |
| 2019 | Grama | 13 | (0) |
| 2019 | Afturelding | 7 | (0) |
| 2019–2020 | Haro Deportivo | 20 | (2) |
| 2020–2021 | Portugalete | 23 | (0) |
| 2021 | Ejea | 11 | (0) |
| 2022–2025 | Vilassar de Mar | 72 | (4) |
| 2025– | Cerdanyola del Vallès | 10 | (0) |
- * Club domestic league appearances and goals as of 9 November 2025

Esteve Monterde Torrents (born 29 October 1995) is a Spanish footballer who plays as a central midfielder for Tercera Federación club Cerdanyola del Vallès.

== Club career ==
Born in Badalona, Barcelona, Catalonia, Esteve represented UDA Gramenet as a youth. He made his debut as a senior with the club in the 2012–13 season in Tercera División, and subsequently joined CF Badalona, returning to youth football.

Definitely promoted to the first team ahead of the 2014–15 campaign, Esteve scored his first senior goal on 23 November 2014, netting the first in a 1–1 draw at UE Cornellà in the Segunda División B championship. On 9 July of the following year he joined Córdoba CF, being assigned to the reserves in the fourth tier.

Esteve made his professional debut on 30 November 2016, coming on as a second half substitute for Carlos Caballero in a 2–0 Copa del Rey home win against Málaga CF. He made his Segunda División debut on 4 December, again from the bench in a 2–1 win at CF Reus Deportiu.

On 12 December 2016, Esteve renewed his contract until 2020, and was promoted to the main squad ahead of the 2017–18 campaign. On 31 August 2018, after spending the past six months with the B-side, he terminated his contract with the club.
