= Juanín (footballer, born 1940) =

Spanish footballer

Personal information
- Full name: Juan García Díaz
- Date of birth: 22 May 1940
- Place of birth: Nerva, Spain
- Date of death: 26 March 2013 (aged 72)
- Place of death: Córdoba, Spain
- Position: Forward

Youth career
- 1955–1957: Betis

Senior career*
| Years | Team | Apps | (Gls) |
| 1957–1959 | Betis B | | |
| 1959–1960 | Extremadura | | |
| 1960–1970 | Córdoba | 216 | (49) |
| 1970–1971 | Calvo Sotelo | 15 | (0) |
| Total | | 231 | (49) |
- * Club domestic league appearances and goals

Juan García Díaz, commonly known as Juanín (22 May 1940 – 26 March 2013), was a Spanish professional footballer who played as a forward.

== Football career ==
Born in Nerva, Province of Huelva, Juanín played professionally for Córdoba CF and CD Calvo Sotelo, having previously represented Real Betis B and CF Extremadura in a senior career which lasted 14 years.

With Córdoba he spent one full decade, competing eight seasons in La Liga and appearing in nearly 300 official games. He scored the Andalusia club's first-ever goal in the top division, against Real Valladolid on 16 September 1962 (1–0 home win), and was part of the squad that reached the semifinals of the Copa del Rey in 1967.

== Later life and death / Personal ==
After retiring, Juanín continued working with Córdoba the club and the city: in the former capacity he acted as assistant coach and, in the latter, he opened its first football school in 1985.

Juanín died on 26 March 2013 at the age of 72, after a brain tumor. His older brother, Ramón, was also a footballer, who played three top level games with Sevilla FC.
