= Jacobo Martí =

Spanish footballer (born 2004)

Personal information
- Full name: Jacobo Martí Rubio
- Date of birth: 24 September 2004 (age 22)
- Place of birth: Valencia, Spain
- Height: 1.82 m (6 ft 0 in)
- Position: Right-back

Team information
- Current team: Córdoba

Youth career
- 2018–2022: Alboraya
- 2022–2023: Levante

Senior career*
Years	Team	Apps	(Gls)
2023–2024	Levante B	27	(2)
2024–2025	Torrent	29	(2)
2025–2026	Mérida	20	(0)
2026–	Córdoba	0	(0)
- * Club domestic league appearances and goals as of 31 May 2026

Jacobo Martí Rubio (born 24 September 2004) is a Spanish footballer who plays as a right-back for Córdoba CF.

== Career ==
Born in Valencia, Martí played for Alboraya UD before joining Levante UD's youth sides in 2022. After making his senior debut with the reserves in the 2023–24 season in Tercera Federación, he left in June 2024, and subsequently signed for Segunda Federación side Torrent CF.

On 20 June 2025, Martí renewed his contract with Torrent for a further year, but was transferred to Primera Federación club Mérida AD on 9 July, after the club paid his release clause. Initially a backup to Felipe Alfonso, he finished the campaign as a first-choice.

On 24 June 2026, Martí agreed to a two-year contract with Córdoba CF of the Segunda División, but suffered a serious knee injury during pre-season.
