= Cristian Carracedo =

Spanish footballer

Personal information
- Full name: Cristian Carracedo García
- Date of birth: 30 November 1995 (age 30)
- Place of birth: L'Hospitalet, Spain
- Height: 1.79 m (5 ft 10 in)
- Position: Winger

Team information
- Current team: Córdoba
- Number: 23

Youth career
- Badalona

Senior career*
Years	Team	Apps	(Gls)
2013–2015	Badalona	28	(0)
2015–2016	Mallorca B	22	(4)
2015	Mallorca	0	(0)
2016–2017	Cacereño	8	(0)
2017–2018	San Fermín	49	(9)
2018	Écija	9	(0)
2018–2019	Córdoba B	24	(4)
2019–2020	Langreo	9	(0)
2020	Ceuta	7	(1)
2020–2021	Prat	7	(0)
2021	Ejea	16	(5)
2021–2022	Linares	32	(5)
2022–	Córdoba	152	(12)
- * Club domestic league appearances and goals as of 6 June 2026

Cristian Carracedo García (born 30 November 1995) is a Spanish footballer who plays as a right winger for Córdoba CF.

== Career ==
Born in L'Hospitalet de Llobregat, Barcelona, Catalonia, Carracedo finished his formation with CF Badalona. On 12 October 2013 he made his senior debut, coming on as a second-half substitute in a 0–2 away loss against Valencia CF Mestalla in the Segunda División B championship.

Carracedo signed for RCD Mallorca on 3 August 2015, being assigned to the reserves in Tercera División. He made his first team debut on 10 September, starting in a 0–2 home loss against SD Huesca, for the season's Copa del Rey; it was his only appearance with the main squad.

After departing the Bermellones, Carracedo subsequently represented Tercera División side CP Cacereño before moving to CD AD San Fermín in the Primera Andaluza in February 2017. After helping in the latter's promotion to the fourth division, he moved to fellow league team Écija Balompié on 5 July 2018, before joining Córdoba CF's B-team in the same category on 23 November.

On 25 July 2019, Carracedo returned to the third division after agreeing to a contract with UP Langreo. After being rarely used, he moved to AD Ceuta FC in the fourth tier the following 28 January, before signing for AE Prat back in the third tier on 14 June 2020.

On 2 January 2021, after again featuring rarely, Carracedo joined SD Ejea also in division three. On 24 June, he was announced at Linares Deportivo of the newly-created Primera División RFEF.

On 8 June 2022, after being a regular starter as the Azulillos narrowly missed out promotion in the play-offs, Carracedo returned to Córdoba on a one-year deal, being now assigned to the main squad also in the third division. On 30 November, he renewed his link until 2025, and contributed with two goals in 41 appearances overall during the 2023–24 campaign as the club achieved promotion to Segunda División.
