= Helibelton Palacios =

Colombian footballer (born 1993)

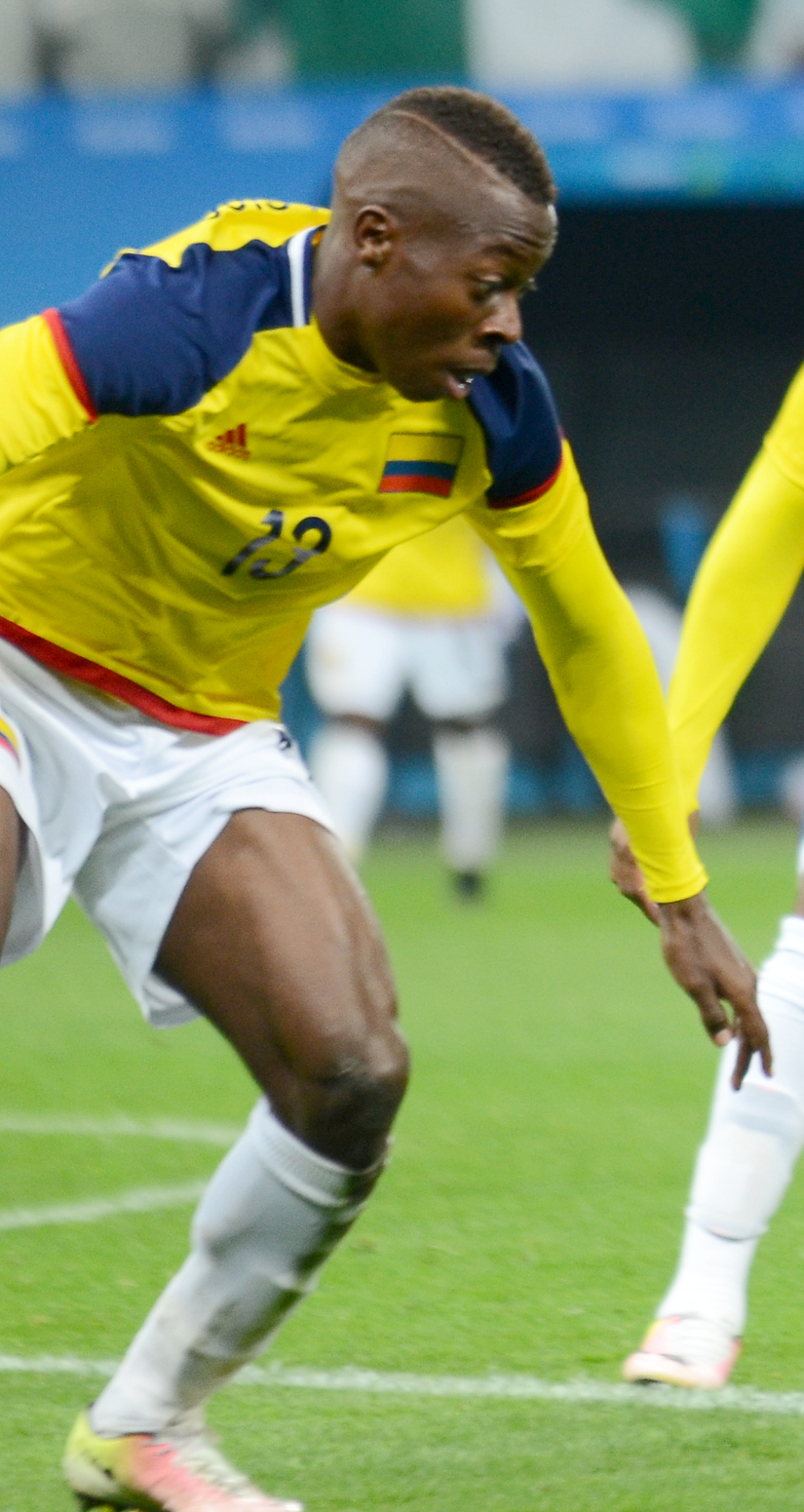
- Palacios with Colombia at the 2016 Summer Olympics

Personal information
- Full name: Helibelton Palacios Zapata
- Date of birth: 11 June 1993 (age 33)
- Place of birth: Santander de Quilichao, Colombia
- Height: 1.77 m (5 ft 10 in)
- Position: Right-back

Team information
- Current team: Santa Fe
- Number: 13

Senior career*
Years	Team	Apps	(Gls)
2011–2016	Deportivo Cali	109	(4)
2014	→ La Equidad (loan)	15	(0)
2017–2018	Club Brugge	16	(0)
2018–2020	Atlético Nacional	92	(1)
2021–2023	Elche	61	(0)
2023–2025	Cruzeiro	9	(0)
2024	→ Sport (loan)	2	(0)
2025	→ Millonarios (loan)	28	(2)
2026–	→ Santa Fe (loan)	1	(0)

International career^{‡}
2013	Colombia U20	12	(0)
2015–2022	Colombia	5	(0)
2016	Colombia Olympic	8	(0)
- * Club domestic league appearances and goals as of 22 January 2026 ‡ National team caps and goals as of 22 January 2026

Helibelton Palacios Zapata (born 11 June 1993) is a Colombian professional footballer who plays as a right-back for Millonarios on loan from Brazilian club Cruzeiro.

== Club career ==
Palacios made his senior debut with Deportivo Cali in 2011, in a 2–1 defeat against Águilas Doradas. After featuring sparingly, he played the 2014 season on loan at La Equidad, before returning to his parent club and winning the league title in 2015.

On 27 December 2016, Deportivo Cali announced the transfer of Palacios to Belgian side Club Brugge KV. After rarely featuring, he returned to Colombia on 16 January 2018 to join Atlético Nacional. In October 2018, he played in the first leg of the Copa Colombia final in a 2–2 draw against Once Caldas. His team won the second leg, and were crowned champions on a 4–3 aggregate score.

On 4 February 2021, free agent Palacios signed for La Liga side Elche CF. At the end of the 2022-23 La Liga season, he rejected a contract renewal offer from the club, becoming a free agent.

In June 2023, Palacios signed a pre-contract with Brazilian Série A club Cruzeiro, joining the club on a 1.5 years contract.

== International career ==
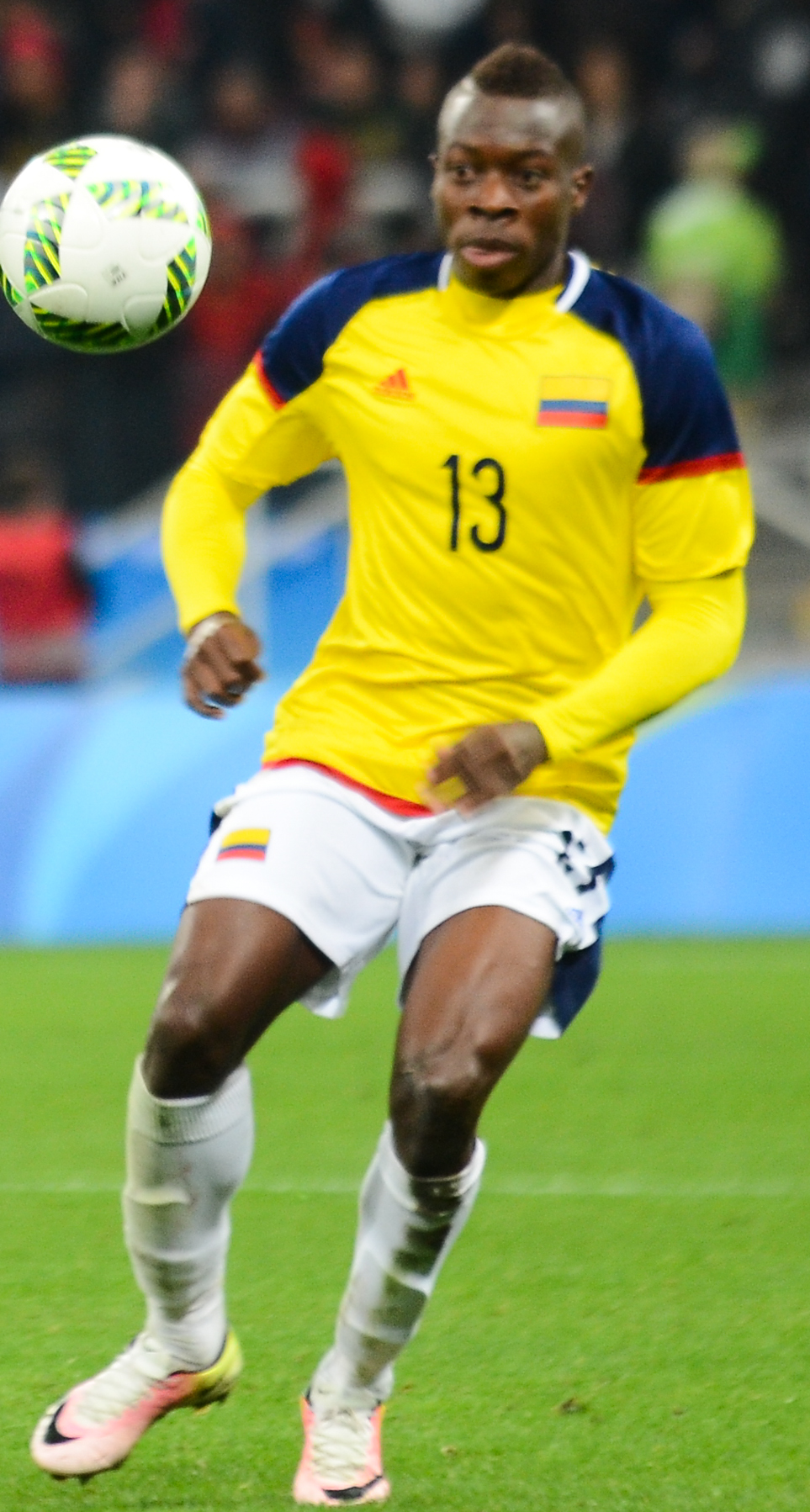
Palacios at the 2016 Summer Olympics

Palacios represented Colombia at under-20 level before making his full international debut in 2015. He also featured for the under-23s in the 2016 Summer Olympics.

== Career statistics ==
=== Club ===
As of match played 9 November 2023

Appearances and goals by club, season and competition
Club	Season	League			National cup		Continental		Other		Total	
Club	Season	Division	Apps	Goals	Apps	Goals	Apps	Goals	Apps	Goals	Apps	Goals
Deportivo Cali	2011	Categoría Primera A	5	0	0	0	0	0	—		5	0
Deportivo Cali	2012	Categoría Primera A	5	0	5	1	0	0	—		10	0
Deportivo Cali	2013	Categoría Primera A	3	0	3	0	0	0	—		6	0
Deportivo Cali	2014	Categoría Primera A	20	3	4	0	4 (Note: Appearances in the Copa Sudamericana)	0	—		28	3
Deportivo Cali	2015	Categoría Primera A	43	0	4	0	0	0	—		47	0
Deportivo Cali	2016	Categoría Primera A	33	1	2	0	6 (Note: Appearances in the Copa Libertadores)	0	2 (Note: Appearances in the Superliga Colombiana)	0	43	1
Deportivo Cali	Total		109	4	18	1	10	0	2	0	139	5
La Equidad (loan)	2014	Categoría Primera A	15	0	0	0	0	0	—		15	0
Club Brugge	2016–17	Belgian First Division A	11	0	0	0	0	0	—		11	0
Club Brugge	2017–18	Belgian First Division A	5	0	1	0	4 (Note: Two appearances in the Champions League and two appearances in the UEFA Europa League)	0	—		10	0
Club Brugge	Total		16	0	1	0	4	0	0	0	21	0
Atlético Nacional	2018	Categoría Primera A	35	1	6	0	8	0	2	0	51	0
Atlético Nacional	2019	Categoría Primera A	42	0	3	0	5 (Note: Four appearances in the Copa Libertadores and one appearance in the Copa Sudamericana)	0	—		50	0
Atlético Nacional	2020	Categoría Primera A	15	0	0	0	4	0	—		19	0
Atlético Nacional	Total		92	1	9	0	17	0	2	0	120	0
Elche	2020–21	La Liga	11	0	0	0	—		—		11	0
Elche	2021–22	La Liga	26	0	3	0	—		—		29	0
Elche	2022–23	La Liga	24	0	1	0	—		—		25	0
Elche	Total		61	0	4	0	0	0	0	0	65	0
Cruzerio	2023	Brazilian Série A	9	0	0	0	—		—		9	0
Career total			302	5	32	1	31	0	4	0	369	6

== Honours ==
Deportivo Cali

- Categoría Primera A: 2015 A

Atlético Nacional

- Copa Colombia: 2018

Colombia U20

- South American Youth Football Championship: 2013
