= Francisco Parreño =

Spanish footballer and manager

Paco Parreño
Personal information
- Full name: Francisco Parreño Granados
- Date of birth: 16 June 1949 (age 77)
- Place of birth: Córdoba, Spain
- Height: 1.79 m (5 ft 10 1/2 in)
- Position: Goalkeeper

Youth career
- 1964–1968: Betis

Senior career*
Years	Team	Apps	(Gls)
1968–1971	Hércules	3	(0)
1971–1972	Espanyol	0	(0)
1972–1973	Rayo Vallecano	12	(0)
1973–1974	Alcoyano	40	(0)
1974–1975	Eldense	1	(0)
1975	Recreativo	0	(0)
1975–1976	Cacereño	11	(0)
1976–1978	Alcoyano		
1978–1980	Gandía	25	(0)
1980–1981	Alcoyano		

Managerial career
- 1981–1982: Alcoyano
- 1982–1983: Rayo Ibense
- 1983–1984: Benidorm
- 1984–1985: Ontinyent
- 1985–1986: Alcoyano
- 1986–1987: Eldense
- 1987–1989: Gimnàstic
- 1989–1991: Cartagena
- 1991–1992: Córdoba
- 1992–1993: Gandía
- 1997–1998: Mensajero
- 1998–1999: Avilés
- 1999–2000: Levante B
- 2000: Águilas
- 2000–2001: Talavera
- 2002: Alcorcón
- 2004–2005: Talavera
- 2015: Rayo Ibense
- 2017: Avilés
- * Club domestic league appearances and goals

Francisco 'Paco' Parreño Granados (born 16 June 1949) is a Spanish retired footballer who played as a goalkeeper, and a current manager.

== Playing career ==
Born in Córdoba, Andalusia, Parreño graduated with Real Betis' youth setup, and made his senior debuts with Hércules CF in 1968, in Tercera División. He achieved promotion to Segunda División with the latter in 1970, and made his professional debut on 3 January 1971, starting in a 2–2 home draw against Córdoba CF.

In the 1971 summer Parreño moved to La Liga's RCD Espanyol, but after being only fourth-choice, he signed for Rayo Vallecano in the following year. After a two-season spell at CD Alcoyano and CD Eldense in the third division, he returned to the second level in 1975, joining Recreativo de Huelva.

Parreño never appeared in any league games for Recre and resumed his career in the lower leagues, representing Alcoyano (two stints) and CF Gandía. He retired in 1981, aged 32.

== Managerial career ==
Immediately after retiring Parreño started working as a manager, coaching his former club Alcoyano. He subsequently managed UD Rayo Ibense, Alcoyano, Benidorm CF, Ontinyent CF, Eldense and Gimnàstic de Tarragona in the 80s, all of them (except Rayo) in Segunda División B.

Parreño also remained in the third level in the 90s, managing Cartagena FC, Córdoba, Gandía, CD Mensajero and Real Avilés. In 2000, he was appointed Águilas CF manager, but failed to achieve a single win during his time at the club, and subsequently suffered team relegation.

Parreño subsequently managed Talavera CF (two spells) and AD Alcorcón, all in the third division. On 31 December 2014, after nearly ten years without a club, he was named Rayo Ibense manager, but left the club a month later.
