= Luna Eslava =

Spanish footballer

Personal information
- Full name: Juan Luna Eslava
- Date of birth: 15 September 1964 (age 62)
- Place of birth: Fernán Núñez, Spain
- Height: 1.82 m (5 ft 11 1/2 in)
- Position: Centre-back

Youth career
- Fernán Núñez

Senior career*
Years	Team	Apps	(Gls)
1983–1990	Fernán Núñez		
1983–1990	Córdoba	251	(0)
1990–1993	Recreativo	103	(3)
1993–1995	Córdoba	49	(2)
1995–1996	Cádiz	30	(1)
1996–1997	Montilla		
1997–2002	Écija	151	(14)
2002–2003	Pozoblanco		
Total		584	(20)

Managerial career
- 2006–2007: Córdoba (youth coordinator)
- 2007–2008: Córdoba (assistant)
- 2008–2009: Córdoba
- 2010–2011: Las Palmas (assistant)
- 2011–2013: Córdoba (director of football)
- 2016: Sporting Gijón (scout)
- 2017: Cruz Azul (assistant)
- 2017–2018: Las Palmas (assistant)
- 2019–2020: Rayo Vallecano (assistant)
- 2021–2022: Ibiza (assistant)
- 2022–2024: Tractor (assistant)
- * Club domestic league appearances and goals

Juan Luna Eslava (born 15 September 1964) is a Spanish retired footballer who played as a central defender, and current assistant coach.

== Playing career ==
Born in Fernán Núñez, Córdoba, Andalusia, Luna Eslava made his debuts as a senior with Fernán Núñez CF. He only played amateur football during his whole career, representing Córdoba CF (two stints), Recreativo de Huelva, Cádiz CF, Montilla CF, Écija Balompié and CD Pozoblanco.

== Post-playing career ==
After a year as a youth coordinator, Luna Eslava was an assistant of Paco Jémez at his former club Córdoba, and remained in the same role with the following manager, José González. On 8 December 2008 he was appointed first team manager, after the latter was dismissed.

In April 2010 Luna Eslava was named Jémez's assistant UD Las Palmas. He left the club in February of the following year, and returned to his main club Córdoba in June, as a director of football. He was fired in February 2013.

In 2016, Eslava worked as a scout for Sporting de Gijón. In December 2016, it was confirmed that Esleva and Paco Jémez were reunited as the duo were set to take charge of the Mexican club Cruz Azul. The duo left Mexico at the end of 2017 and shortly after, on 27 December 2017, they were presented in Las Palmas. Here the duo stayed until the end of the season.

On 19 March 2019 Esleva and Jémez were presented in Rayo Vallecano. They left the club in July 2020. At the end of 2020, they became the new coaching duo at UD Ibiza.

In December 2022, Jémez became the coach of Iranian club Tractor, again with Esleva as his assistant. In April 2024, it was revealed that Jémez, along with the rest of his staff, including Esleva, had their contracts terminated and returned to Spain as the 2024 Iran-Israel conflict began to escalate, and that the coaching staff had been evacuated as a result.
