= Igor Stefanović =

Serbian footballer

Personal information
- Full name: Igor Stefanović
- Date of birth: 17 July 1987 (age 39)
- Place of birth: Svrljig, SFR Yugoslavia
- Height: 1.93 m (6 ft 4 in)
- Position: Goalkeeper

Team information
- Current team: Leixões
- Number: 51

Youth career
- Radnički Niš

Senior career*
Years	Team	Apps	(Gls)
2004–2006	Radnički Niš	51	(0)
2007	Zemun	10	(0)
2007	Voždovac	1	(0)
2008–2009	Borac Čačak	0	(0)
2009–2010	Banat Zrenjanin	9	(0)
2010	Voždovac	0	(0)
2011	Rabotnički	14	(0)
2011–2012	Santa Clara	30	(0)
2012–2014	Porto B	42	(0)
2013	→ Arouca (loan)	1	(0)
2014–2015	Chaves	19	(0)
2015–2017	Moreirense	31	(0)
2017–2018	Córdoba	6	(0)
2018–2019	Arouca	23	(0)
2019–	Leixões	89	(0)

International career
2005	Serbia and Montenegro U19 (Note: Only official UEFA matches included)	3	(0)
2006–2007	Serbia U21	4	(0)
- * Club domestic league appearances and goals as of 19 June 2026

Igor Stefanović (Serbian Cyrillic: Игор Стефановић; born 17 July 1987) is a Serbian professional footballer who plays as a goalkeeper for Portuguese club Leixões.

== Club career ==
Born in Svrljig, Stefanović came through the youth ranks of Radnički Niš, making his first senior appearances in 2004. He was transferred to Zemun in the 2007 winter transfer window. After debuting in the top flight of Serbian football, Stefanović switched to Voždovac in the summer of 2007. He recorded just one appearance for the club, before moving to Borac Čačak in the 2008 winter transfer window. Over the following 18 months, Stefanović failed to make any appearances for the club, being completely overshadowed by more experienced Saša Radivojević and Branko Grahovac. He subsequently joined Banat Zrenjanin, collecting nine appearances in the 2009–10 Serbian First League.

In July 2011, Stefanović moved to Portugal and joined Santa Clara. He was the team's first-choice goalkeeper in the 2011–12 season, playing the full 90 minutes in all 30 games. In June 2012, Stefanović signed a three-year contract with Porto. He was immediately assigned to their reserve team, playing regularly in the 2012–13 season.

In the summer of 2015, Stefanović signed with Primeira Liga side Moreirense. He made 31 league appearances in his debut season, helping them to avoid relegation. In July 2017, Stefanović was transferred to Spanish club Córdoba.

In late 2018, Stefanović returned to Portugal and rejoined his former club Arouca.

== International career ==
In 2006, Stefanović appeared as a substitute in two friendlies for Serbia U21 (against the Czech Republic and Portugal). He was later named by Miroslav Đukić in the 23-man squad for the 2007 UEFA European Under-21 Championship, but was forced to miss the tournament due to an injury. Later on, Stefanović earned two more caps for the under-21 side, playing the full 90 minutes in both of Serbia's games at the Valeriy Lobanovskyi Memorial Tournament in August 2007.

== Honours ==
Moreirense

- Taça da Liga: 2016–17
