= Gerard Barri =

Spanish footballer

Personal information
- Full name: Gerard Barri Paytuví
- Date of birth: 2 January 2001 (age 25)
- Place of birth: Vallgorguina, Spain
- Position: Right back

Team information
- Current team: Avilés (on loan from Huesca)
- Number: 14

Youth career
- Vallgorguina
- 2009–2011: PB Sant Celoni
- 2011–2012: CE Sant Celoni
- 2012–2013: Barcelona
- 2013–2014: Mataró
- 2014–2019: Espanyol

Senior career*
Years	Team	Apps	(Gls)
2019–2021	Elche Ilicitano	27	(1)
2021	Elche	0	(0)
2021–	Huesca B	1	(0)
2021–	Huesca	0	(0)
2022–	→ Avilés (loan)	1	(0)
- * Club domestic league appearances and goals as of 18 February 2022

Gerard Barri Paytuví (born 2 January 2001) is a Spanish footballer who plays as a right back for Real Avilés CF, on loan from SD Huesca.

== Club career ==
Born in Vallgorguina, Barcelona, Catalonia, Barri joined FC Barcelona's La Masia in June 2012, after representing CE Sant Celoni, PB Sant Celoni and FC Vallgorguina. He left the club in the following year, subsequently spending a year at EF Mataró before signing for RCD Espanyol in 2014.

In 2019, after finishing his formation, Barri moved to Elche CF and was assigned to the reserves in Tercera División. He made his senior debut on 31 August by starting in a 2–0 away win against CD Roda, and scored his first goal on 15 December, in a 3–2 win at UD Benigànim.

Barri made his professional debut on 16 January 2021, starting in a 0–2 loss at Rayo Vallecano, for the season's Copa del Rey. On 27 July, he moved to another reserve team, SD Huesca B in Segunda División RFEF.

On 19 January 2022, after just one match, Barri was loaned to Real Avilés CF also in the fourth tier, until June.
