= Nerva, Spain =

Town and municipality in Huelva, Spain

Nerva
- Municipality
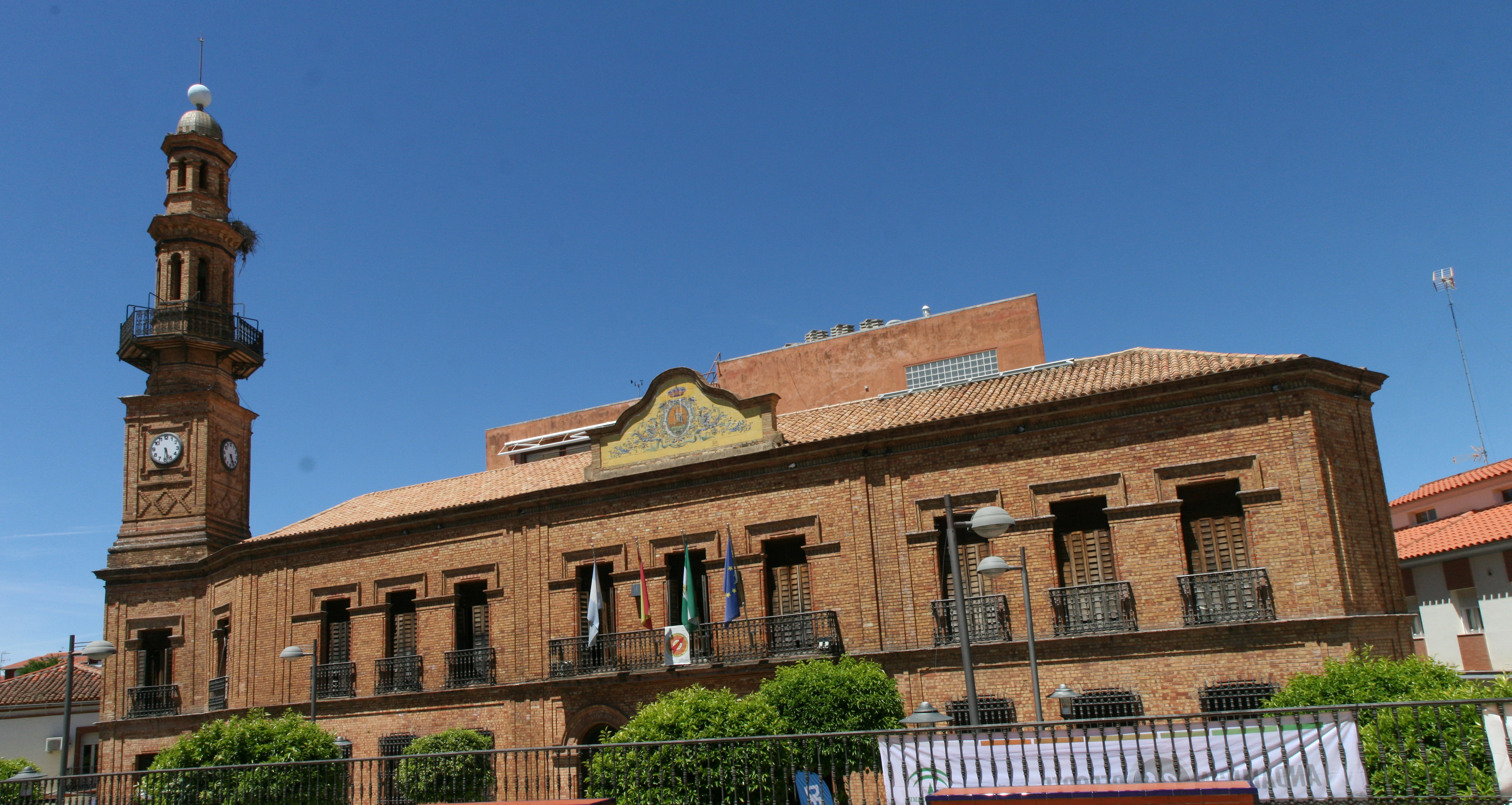
- Town hall

- Flag Coat of arms

- Location in Spain
- Coordinates: 37°41′N 6°32′W
- Country: Spain
- Autonomous community: Andalusia
- Province: Huelva
- Comarca: Cuenca Minera

Government
  - Mayor: Domingo Domínguez Bueno

Area
  - Total: 55 km^{2} (21 sq mi)
- Elevation: 332 m (1,089 ft)

Population (2025-01-01)
  - Total: 5,087
  - Density: 92/km^{2} (240/sq mi)
- Demonym: Nervenses
- Time zone: UTC+1 (CET)
  - Summer (DST): UTC+2 (CEST)
- Postal code: 21670
- Official language(s): Spanish
- Website: Official website

Nerva is a town and municipality located in the province of Huelva, southern Spain.

== Twin towns — Sister cities ==
Nerva is twinned with:

- Narva, Estonia

== See also ==
- List of municipalities in Huelva
- Local government in Spain
