= Diego Bri =

Spanish footballer

Personal information
- Full name: Diego Vicente Bri Carrazoni
- Date of birth: 12 September 2002 (age 24)
- Place of birth: Elche, Spain
- Height: 1.77 m (5 ft 10 in)
- Position: Winger

Team information
- Current team: Córdoba
- Number: 5

Youth career
- Celtic Elche
- 2016–2021: Elche

Senior career*
Years	Team	Apps	(Gls)
2018–2022	Elche B	54	(13)
2020–2022	Elche	2	(0)
2022–2026	Atlético Madrid B	94	(15)
2025–2026	→ Córdoba (loan)	28	(3)
2026–	Córdoba	0	(0)
- * Club domestic league appearances and goals as of 6 June 2026

Diego Vicente Bri Carrazoni (born 12 September 2002) is a Spanish professional footballer who plays as a winger for Córdoba CF.

== Club career ==
Born in Elche, Alicante, Valencian Community, Bri joined Elche CF's youth setup in 2016, from CF Celtic Elche. On 2 December 2018, aged just 17, he made his senior debut with the reserves by coming on as a half-time substitute in a 0–3 Tercera División away loss against Vilamarxant CF.

Bri made his professional debut with the Franjiverdes on 12 June 2020, replacing Omenuke Mfulu in a 1–1 home draw against Extremadura UD in the Segunda División championship. He scored his first senior goal on 29 November, netting the B's third in a 3–1 home win against Crevillente Deportivo.

On 24 June 2022, Bri signed a four-year contract with Atlético Madrid, being initially assigned to the reserves in Segunda División RFEF. On 16 July 2025, he was loaned to Córdoba CF in the second division, for one year.

Bri scored his first professional goal on 8 November 2025, netting a last-minute equalizer in a 2–2 away draw against Málaga CF. The following 2 July, he signed a permanent two-year deal with the Blanquiverdes.

== Personal life ==
Bri's father José was also a footballer, but only played amateur football during his entire career.
