= Córdoba CF B =

Association football club in Spain

Córdoba B
- Full name: Córdoba Club de Fútbol "B" (Unión Futbolística Cordobesa, S.A.D.)
- Founded: 1951; 75 years ago as Club Atlético Almagro
- Ground: Ciudad Deportiva, Córdoba, Andalusia, Spain
- Capacity: 3,000
- President: Abdulla Al-Zain
- Head coach: Diego Tristán
- League: Tercera Federación – Group 10
- 2025–26: Tercera Federación – Group 10, 9th of 18
Home colours	Away colours	Third colours

Córdoba Club de Fútbol "B" is a Spanish football team based in Córdoba, in the autonomous community of Andalusia. Founded in 1951 as Club Atlético Almagro, it is the reserve team of Córdoba CF and currently plays in Tercera Federación – Group 10, holding home games at Ciudad Deportiva Rafael Gómez, with a 3,000-seat capacity.

== History ==
In 2013, after finishing second to Algeciras CF in its Tercera División group, Córdoba B qualified for the play-offs, defeating CD Castellón 2–0 in the first round before being eliminated on the away goals rule by neighbouring reserve team Granada CF B in the second. However, due to the expulsion of another Andalusian team, cash-strapped Xerez CD, Córdoba B enlisted in Segunda División B for the first time ahead of the new season.

After a two-year stay in the third tier, Córdoba B was relegated, but bounced back instantly in 2016 by winning their group and defeating CF Lorca Deportiva 4–2 on aggregate in the play-off despite losing the first leg.

== Season to season ==
- As Club Atlético Almagro

Season	Tier	Division	Place	Copa del Rey
1951–52	4	1ª Reg.		
1952–53	4	1ª Reg.		
1953–54	4	1ª Reg.		

- As Club Deportivo Guardia de Franco

Season	Tier	Division	Place	Copa del Rey
1954–55	4	1ª Reg.		
1955–56	4	1ª Reg.		
1956–57	3	3ª	13th	

- As Club Atlético Cordobés (Farm team)

Season	Tier	Division	Place	Copa del Rey
1957–58	3	3ª	13th	
1958–59	3	3ª	4th	
1959–60	3	3ª	8th	
1960–61	3	3ª	12th	
1961–62	3	3ª	16th	
1962–63	3	3ª	10th	
1963–64	3	3ª	2nd	
1964–65	3	3ª	11th	

Season	Tier	Division	Place	Copa del Rey
1965–66	3	3ª	15th	
1966–67	4	1ª Reg.		
1967–68	4	1ª Reg.		
1968–69	4	1ª Reg.	5th	
1969–70	4	1ª Reg.	2nd	
1970–71	4	1ª Reg.	12th	
1971–72	4	1ª Reg.	21st	

- As Córdoba CF's reserve team

Season	Tier	Division	Place	Copa del Rey
1972–73	5	2ª Reg.	11th	
1973–74	5	2ª Reg.	11th	
1974–75	4	Reg. Pref.	10th	
1975–76	4	Reg. Pref.	8th	
1976–77	4	Reg. Pref.	17th	
1977–78	5	Reg. Pref.	1st	
1978–79	5	Reg. Pref.	16th	
1979–80	5	Reg. Pref.	18th	
1980–81	5	Reg. Pref.	15th	
1981–82	5	Reg. Pref.	18th	
1982–83	5	Reg. Pref.	14th	
1983–84	5	Reg. Pref.	13th	
1984–85	5	Reg. Pref.	16th	
1985–1997	DNP			DNP
1997–98	6	1ª Reg.		DNP
1998–99	5	Reg. Pref.	2nd	DNP
1999–2000	4	3ª	12th	DNP
2000–01	4	3ª	8th	DNP
2001–02	4	3ª	7th	DNP
2002–03	4	3ª	8th	DNP

Season	Tier	Division	Place
2003–04	4	3ª	18th
2004–05	5	1ª And.	2nd
2005–06	4	3ª	16th
2006–07	4	3ª	13th
2007–08	4	3ª	13th
2008–09	4	3ª	17th
2009–10	4	3ª	9th
2010–11	4	3ª	10th
2011–12	4	3ª	10th
2012–13	4	3ª	2nd
2013–14	3	2ª B	11th
2014–15	3	2ª B	18th
2015–16	4	3ª	1st
2016–17	3	2ª B	11th
2017–18	3	2ª B	18th
2018–19	4	3ª	8th
2019–20	4	3ª	19th
2020–21	4	3ª	4th / 1st
2021–22	5	3ª RFEF	6th
2022–23	5	3ª Fed.	2nd

Season	Tier	Division	Place
2023–24	5	3ª Fed.	13th
2024–25	5	3ª Fed.	11th
2025–26	5	3ª Fed.	9th
2026–27	5	3ª Fed.	

- 4 seasons in Segunda División B
- 27 seasons in Tercera División
- 6 seasons in Tercera Federación/Tercera División RFEF

== Honours ==
- Tercera División: 2015–16

== Current squad ==
As of 7 September 2026

Note: Flags indicate national team as defined under FIFA eligibility rules; some limited exceptions apply. Players may hold more than one non-FIFA nationality.

No.	Pos.	Nation	Player
1	GK	ESP	Alejandro Arévalo
2	DF	ESP	Dani Albuera
3	DF	GHA	Jonathan Korbla
4	DF	ESP	Cristian Osca
5	DF	ESP	Miguelón
6	MF	BHR	Hashem Khalaifat
7	FW	ESP	Pablo Muñoz
8	DF	ESP	Álex López
9	FW	SWE	Jens Olsson
10	FW	ESP	Viti Álvarez
11	MF	ESP	Javi Antrás

No.	Pos.	Nation	Player
13	GK	ESP	Javi Martín
16	MF	ESP	Borja García
17	FW	JOR	Naser Al-Dajani
18	MF	ESP	Diego Tristán
20	DF	BOL	Marcelo Timorán
21	MF	ESP	Adrián Roizo
22	DF	ESP	Dani García
23	MF	ESP	Gonzalo Moratalla
24	DF	ESP	Ángel Rodríguez
—	DF	ESP	Álex Ramírez

=== From Youth Academy ===
Note: Flags indicate national team as defined under FIFA eligibility rules; some limited exceptions apply. Players may hold more than one non-FIFA nationality.

No.	Pos.	Nation	Player
26	GK	ESP	Jorge Del Valle
28	MF	ESP	Carlos Aranda

No.	Pos.	Nation	Player
29	FW	ESP	Mady Keita

== Notable players ==
- (Spain) Sebas Moyano

== Notable coaches ==
- (Spain) José Antonio Romero
- (Spain) Pablo Villa
- (Spain) Rafael Berges
