= Córdoba CF =

Association football club in Spain

Córdoba
- Full name: Córdoba Club de Fútbol (Unión Futbolística Cordobesa, S.A.D.)
- Nicknames: Los Califas (The Caliphs); Los Blanquiverdes (The White and Greens)
- Founded: 6 August 1954; 72 years ago
- Stadium: Estadio Bahrain Victorious Nuevo Arcángel de Córdoba
- Capacity: 21,650
- Owner: Infinity Capital
- President: Abdulla Al-Zain
- Head coach: Iván Ania
- League: Segunda División
- 2025–26: Segunda División, 9th of 22
- Website: cordobacf.com
| Home colours | Away colours | Third colours |

Córdoba Club de Fútbol (Spanish pronunciation: [ˈkoɾðoβa]), is a Spanish football club based in Córdoba, in the autonomous community of Andalusia. Founded in 1954 after the dissolution of RCD Córdoba, the team currently plays in the Segunda Division, with its home matches at the Estadio Nuevo Arcángel, which has a capacity of 21,650 seats.

== History ==
Chart of Córdoba CF league performance 1929-2023

Forerunners of Córdoba Club de Fútbol included names such as Sporting Fútbol Club de Córdoba, Sociedad Deportiva Electromecánicas and Racing Fútbol Club de Córdoba. The latter changed its name after the Spanish Civil War (as foreign names were banned under the new regime) to Club Deportivo Córdoba.

From 1940, its predecessor RCD Córdoba met varying success, spending most of its time in the second and third divisions of Spanish football. In 1944 it changed its home kit to green and white stripes, from the previous one of all white, and, the following year, Córdoba moved from Estadio America to Estadio del Arcángel. In 1954, RCD Córdoba was dissolved due to its many debts and Córdoba CF was refounded by acquiring the place of CD San Álvaro de Córdoba in the third category.

In the early 1960s and also in 1971–72, Córdoba amassed eight La Liga seasons. In its third presence it only conceded two goals at home as it went undefeated, the first being courtesy of Espanyol's Alfredo Di Stéfano. The club finished 5th, its best finish to date, but was not allowed to enter the following season's UEFA Cup due to city infrastructure issues.

In the following four decades Córdoba again fluctuated between divisions two and three, also spending 1984–85 in the fourth. After a successful 1999–2000 season in Segunda División B Córdoba was finally promoted to Segunda División.

On 17 February 2014, former Spanish international Albert Ferrer was hired as Córdoba manager. He led the team to a 7th-place finish, and then Córdoba defeated Las Palmas in the Segunda División play-off final to return to the top flight for the first time in 42 years. Ulises Dávila scored the decisive goal, a late equaliser in the away second leg, after Las Palmas fans had caused ten minutes to be added onto the game by invading the pitch.

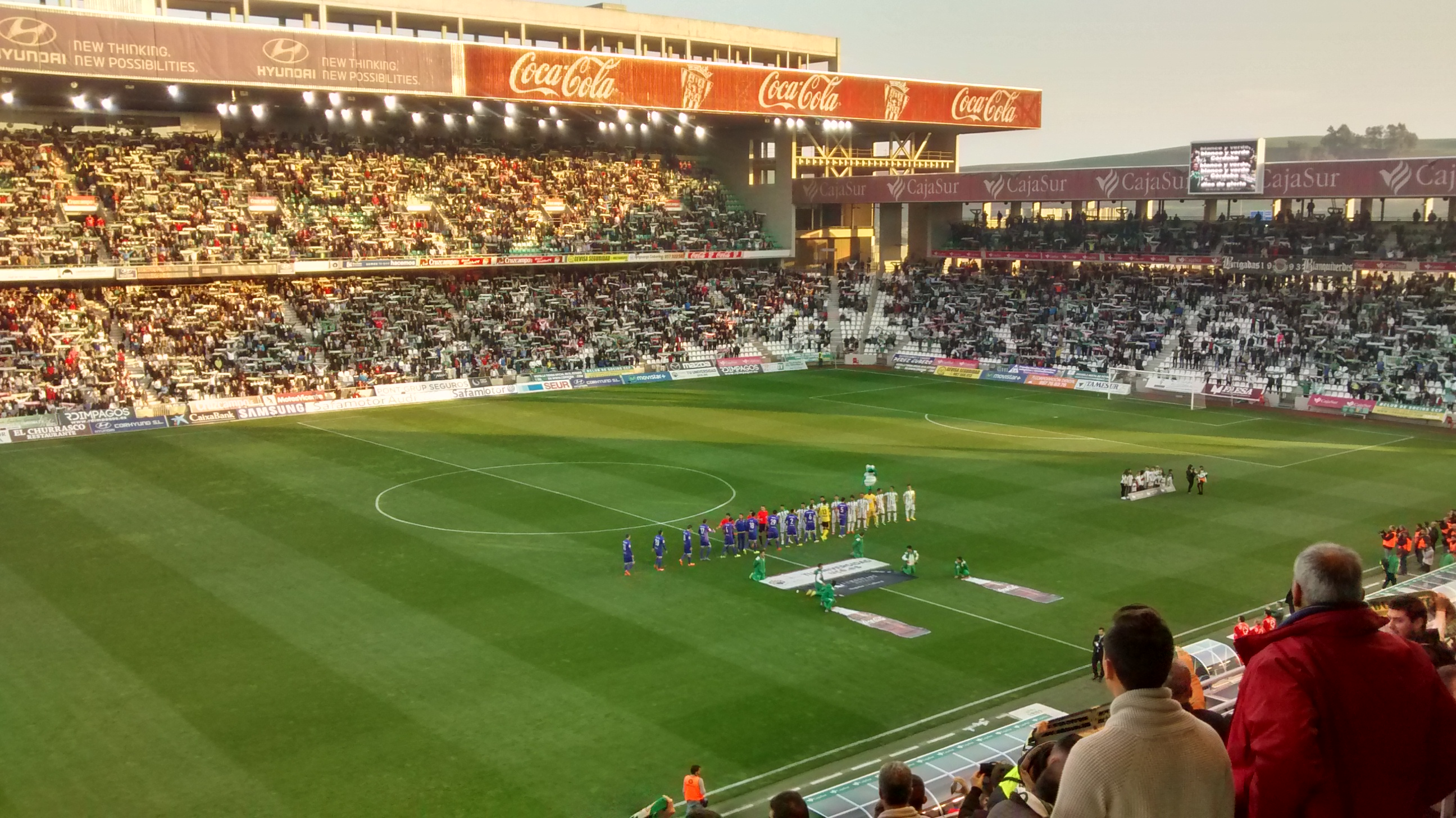
Match of Segunda División between Córdoba C.F. and C.D. Leganés (2:3), January 2016.

Córdoba experienced a difficult return to La Liga however. In their opening match of the 2014–15 season, Córdoba lost 2–0 away at Real Madrid, putting them in 19th place on the table, after round 1. Following that, the team did not achieve a single win, up until the 14th round, when they managed to win 0–1 away at Athletic Bilbao. This boosted their hopes for survival in the elite. Additional wins against CF Granada at home and Rayo Vallecano away in rounds 17 and 18 put the team in 14th place. However, ten straight defeats from rounds 20-29 again put the Andalusians in last place. The team did not improve, remaining in last place until the end of the season. They only collected two points from their last 18 games, thus losing all hopes for survival. At the end of the season, Córdoba only collected 20 points, 15 points behind Granada CF, which avoided relegation. Their relegation was confirmed with three games remaining after a 0–8 home defeat against FC Barcelona.

On 15 June 2018, the club announced that it had purchased local women's club AD El Naranjo and their respective youth teams with the intention of turning them into the club's official women's team. The newly created Córdoba Club de Fútbol Femenino will play in the Spanish Segunda División (women) starting in the 2018–19 season. After ranking second-to-last in the 2018–19 Segunda División (after disqualified Reus), the club was demoted to Segunda B.

In December 2019, the club was purchased by Infinity, an investment fund from Bahrain, for a reported amount of €3.25 million The club gained promotion to the Primera RFEF (the third tier of the Spanish league system) in April 2022.

In June 2024, Córdoba gain promoted to the second division after a 5-year absence by beating Barcelona Atlètic in the promotion play-off.

== Stadium ==
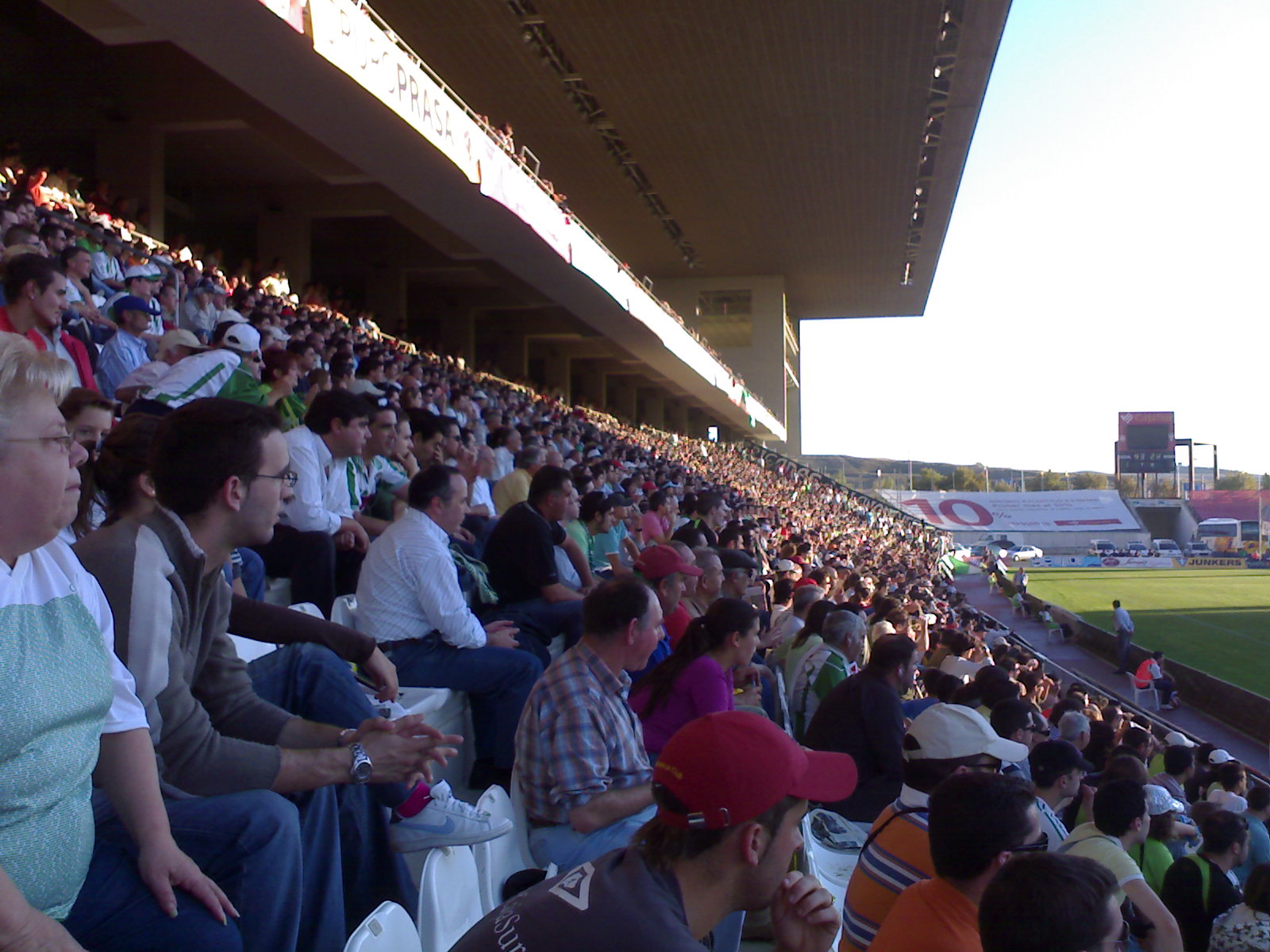
Crowd at the Estadio Nuevo Arcángel

Córdoba currently plays at the Estadio Nuevo Arcángel, opened in 1993. Since 2004 the stadium has been going through a remodelling, converting it to a pure football stadium. Three of the four sides have been rebuilt. When the fourth stand is rebuilt the capacity will be 25,100 seats.

== Season to season ==
- As CD San Álvaro

| Season | Tier | Division | Place | Copa del Rey |
|---|---|---|---|---|
| 1951–52 | 5 | 2ª Reg. | 1st | |
| 1952–53 | 4 | 1ª Reg. | 1st | |
| 1953–54 | 3 | 3ª | 4th | |

- As Córdoba CF

| Season | Tier | Division | Place | Copa del Rey |
|---|---|---|---|---|
| 1954–55 | 3 | 3ª | 4th | |
| 1955–56 | 3 | 3ª | 1st | |
| 1956–57 | 2 | 2ª | 4th | |
| 1957–58 | 2 | 2ª | 11th | |
| 1958–59 | 2 | 2ª | 8th | Round of 32 |
| 1959–60 | 2 | 2ª | 2nd | Round of 16 |
| 1960–61 | 2 | 2ª | 9th | Round of 32 |
| 1961–62 | 2 | 2ª | 1st | First round |
| 1962–63 | 1 | 1ª | 12th | Round of 16 |
| 1963–64 | 1 | 1ª | 11th | Round of 16 |
| 1964–65 | 1 | 1ª | 5th | Round of 16 |
| 1965–66 | 1 | 1ª | 11th | Round of 16 |
| 1966–67 | 1 | 1ª | 12th | Semi-finals |
| 1967–68 | 1 | 1ª | 13th | Round of 32 |
| 1968–69 | 1 | 1ª | 16th | Round of 16 |
| 1969–70 | 2 | 2ª | 5th | Round of 32 |
| 1970–71 | 2 | 2ª | 4th | Third round |
| 1971–72 | 1 | 1ª | 17th | Fourth round |
| 1972–73 | 2 | 2ª | 13th | Third round |
| 1973–74 | 2 | 2ª | 13th | Fourth round |

| Season | Tier | Division | Place | Copa del Rey |
|---|---|---|---|---|
| 1974–75 | 2 | 2ª | 4th | Fourth round |
| 1975–76 | 2 | 2ª | 8th | First round |
| 1976–77 | 2 | 2ª | 15th | Fourth round |
| 1977–78 | 2 | 2ª | 18th | Fourth round |
| 1978–79 | 3 | 2ª B | 17th | Third round |
| 1979–80 | 3 | 2ª B | 7th | Second round |
| 1980–81 | 3 | 2ª B | 2nd | First round |
| 1981–82 | 2 | 2ª | 13th | Second round |
| 1982–83 | 2 | 2ª | 20th | First round |
| 1983–84 | 3 | 2ª B | 19th | First round |
| 1984–85 | 4 | 3ª | 2nd | |
| 1985–86 | 3 | 2ª B | 3rd | First round |
| 1986–87 | 3 | 2ª B | 9th | First round |
| 1987–88 | 3 | 2ª B | 5th | Fourth round |
| 1988–89 | 3 | 2ª B | 13th | Third round |
| 1989–90 | 3 | 2ª B | 12th | |
| 1990–91 | 3 | 2ª B | 3rd | Third round |
| 1991–92 | 3 | 2ª B | 11th | Third round |
| 1992–93 | 3 | 2ª B | 9th | Fourth round |
| 1993–94 | 3 | 2ª B | 7th | Third round |

| Season | Tier | Division | Place | Copa del Rey |
|---|---|---|---|---|
| 1994–95 | 3 | 2ª B | 1st | Second round |
| 1995–96 | 3 | 2ª B | 4th | Second round |
| 1996–97 | 3 | 2ª B | 1st | First round |
| 1997–98 | 3 | 2ª B | 6th | First round |
| 1998–99 | 3 | 2ª B | 3rd | |
| 1999–2000 | 2 | 2ª | 12th | First round |
| 2000–01 | 2 | 2ª | 12th | Round of 64 |
| 2001–02 | 2 | 2ª | 13th | Quarter-finals |
| 2002–03 | 2 | 2ª | 15th | Round of 64 |
| 2003–04 | 2 | 2ª | 16th | Round of 32 |
| 2004–05 | 2 | 2ª | 19th | Round of 32 |
| 2005–06 | 3 | 2ª B | 6th | Second round |
| 2006–07 | 3 | 2ª B | 4th | First round |
| 2007–08 | 2 | 2ª | 18th | Second round |
| 2008–09 | 2 | 2ª | 13th | Second round |
| 2009–10 | 2 | 2ª | 10th | Third round |
| 2010–11 | 2 | 2ª | 16th | Round of 16 |
| 2011–12 | 2 | 2ª | 6th | Round of 16 |
| 2012–13 | 2 | 2ª | 14th | Round of 16 |
| 2013–14 | 2 | 2ª | 7th | Second round |

| Season | Tier | Division | Place | Copa del Rey |
|---|---|---|---|---|
| 2014–15 | 1 | 1ª | 20th | Round of 32 |
| 2015–16 | 2 | 2ª | 5th | Second round |
| 2016–17 | 2 | 2ª | 10th | Round of 16 |
| 2017–18 | 2 | 2ª | 16th | Third round |
| 2018–19 | 2 | 2ª | 21st | Round of 32 |
| 2019–20 | 3 | 2ª B | 5th | First round |
| 2020–21 | 3 | 2ª B | 5th / 3rd | Round of 32 |
| 2021–22 | 4 | 2ª RFEF | 1st | First round |
| 2022–23 | 3 | 1ª Fed. | 9th | First round |
| 2023–24 | 3 | 1ª Fed. | 2nd | |
| 2024–25 | 2 | 2ª | 14th | First round |
| 2025–26 | 2 | 2ª | 9th | First round |
| 2026–27 | 2 | 2ª | | TBD |

- 9 seasons in La Liga
- 36 seasons in Segunda División
- 2 seasons in Primera Federación
- 22 seasons in Segunda División B
- 1 season in Segunda Federación
- 4 seasons in Tercera División

== Honours ==
- Segunda División
  - Winners (1): 1961–62
- Segunda División B (Note: Third tier)
  - Winners (2): 1994–95, (Note: Not promoted in play-offs) 1996–97 (Note: Not promoted in play-offs)
- Tercera División
  - Winners (1): (Note: Third tier) 1955–56 (Note: Promoted in play-offs)
- Copa Federación de España
  - Winners (1): 2021
- Trofeo Colombino
  - Winners (1): 2024

== Current squad ==
As of 2 September 2026

Note: Flags indicate national team as defined under FIFA eligibility rules; some limited exceptions apply. Players may hold more than one non-FIFA nationality.

| No. | Pos. | Nation | Player |
|---|---|---|---|
| 1 | GK | AND | Iker Álvarez |
| 3 | DF | ESP | Dani Tasende |
| 4 | DF | ESP | Álex Martín |
| 5 | DF | ESP | Juan Gutiérrez |
| 6 | MF | ESP | Damián Cáceres |
| 7 | MF | FRA | Théo Zidane |
| 8 | MF | ESP | Isma Ruiz |
| 9 | FW | ESP | Diego Percan |
| 10 | FW | ESP | Kevin Medina |
| 11 | FW | ESP | Diego Bri |
| 12 | DF | CMR | Franck Fomeyem |
| 13 | GK | POR | Guilherme Fernandes |
| 14 | MF | MAR | Adnane Ghailan |
| 15 | FW | ESP | Víctor Sánchez |

| No. | Pos. | Nation | Player |
|---|---|---|---|
| 16 | DF | ESP | Rubén Alves |
| 17 | FW | POR | Adilson |
| 18 | FW | ESP | Enol Rodríguez |
| 19 | FW | ESP | Ibai Sanz (on loan from Athletic Bilbao) |
| 20 | DF | POR | Nélson Monte (on loan from Almería) |
| 21 | DF | ESP | Carlos Albarrán |
| 22 | MF | MLI | Yussi Diarra (on loan from Cádiz) |
| 23 | FW | ESP | Cristian Carracedo |
| 24 | FW | MAR | Salim El Jebari |
| 27 | DF | ESP | Egoitz Muñoz (on loan from Alavés) |
| 28 | MF | ESP | Eder García (on loan from Athletic Bilbao) |
| 29 | DF | ESP | Jacobo Martí |
| 30 | DF | ESP | Dani Budesca (on loan from Villarreal) |

=== Reserve team ===
Note: Flags indicate national team as defined under FIFA eligibility rules; some limited exceptions apply. Players may hold more than one non-FIFA nationality.

| No. | Pos. | Nation | Player |
|---|---|---|---|
| 26 | GK | ESP | Alejandro Arévalo |
| 32 | DF | ESP | Álex López |

=== Out on loan ===
Note: Flags indicate national team as defined under FIFA eligibility rules; some limited exceptions apply. Players may hold more than one non-FIFA nationality.

| No. | Pos. | Nation | Player |
|---|---|---|---|
| — | GK | ESP | Ramon Vila (at Eldense until 30 June 2027) |
| — | FW | BRA | Dalisson de Almeida (at Hajduk Split until 30 June 2027) |
| — | FW | ESP | Dani Lidueña (at Avilés Industrial until 30 June 2027) |

| No. | Pos. | Nation | Player |
|---|---|---|---|
| — | FW | ESP | Mariano Carmona (at Eldense until 30 June 2027) |
| — | FW | ESP | Unai Sabroso (at Ponferradina until 30 June 2027) |

=== Retired numbers ===
8 (Spain) Juanín (deceased) (1960–70)

=== Current technical staff ===
| Position | Staff |
|---|---|
| Manager | (Spain) Iván Ania |
| Assistant manager | (Spain) César Negredo |
| Goalkeeping coach | (Spain) Sebas Moyano (Spain) Fabián Fernández |
| Fitness coach | (Spain) Pablo Gutiérrez (Spain) Eu Gavilán |

== Former players ==
See Category:Córdoba CF footballers

- (Spain) Vicente del Bosque
- (Romania) Florin Andone
- (Spain) José Antonio Reyes
- (Argentina) Daniel Onega
- (Spain) Juanin
- (Spain) Miguel Reina
- (Spain) Paco Jémez
- (Spain) Rafael Berges
- (Spain) Toni Muñoz
- (Spain) Javi Moreno
- (Argentina) Roque Olsen
- (Russia) Oleg Salenko
- (Argentina) Fernando Cáceres
- (Spain) Miguel de las Cuevas
- (Italy) Federico Piovaccari
- (Spain) Javi Flores
- (Slovenia) Rene Krhin
- (Panama) Fidel Escobar
- (Uruguay) Nicolás Olivera
- (Argentina) Ariel Montenegro
- (Spain) Alejandro Alfaro
- (Poland) Paweł Kieszek
- (Cameroon) Lauren
- (Argentina) Cristian Osvaldo Álvarez
- (Spain) Juan Luna Eslava
- (Spain) Jaime Romero
- (Spain) Robert Fernández
- (Spain) Jesús García Sanjuán
- (Argentina) Silvio González
- (Brazil) Charles Dias de Oliveira
- (Portugal) Bebé
- (Spain) Fede Vico
- (Spain) Xisco Jiménez
- (Italy) Alessandro Pierini
- (Spain) Rafa Navarro
- (Spain) Borja García
- (Philippines) Javier Patiño

== Former coaches ==
- (Spain) José Juncosa (1955–57)
- (Spain) Miguel Gual Agustina (1958–59)
- (Argentina) Roque Olsen (1959–63)
- (Spain) Rosendo Hernández (1963–64)
- (Spain) Ignacio Eizaguirre (1964–65)
- (Spain) Eduardo Toba (1965–66)
- (France) Marcel Domingo (1966–68)
- (Hungary) (Spain) (Czechoslovakia) László Kubala (1968–69)
- (Spain) Ignacio Eizaguirre (1969–70)
- (Spain) José Juncosa (1970–71)
- (Brazil) Vavá (1971–72)
- (Spain) Joseíto (1972–73)
- (Brazil) Vavá (1974–75)
- (Spain) Ignacio Eizaguirre (1975–77)
- (Spain) Pachín (1981)
- (Paraguay) Cayetano Ré (1981–82)
- (Socialist Federal Republic of Yugoslavia) Zdravko Rajkov (1981–83)
- (Spain) Manuel Ruiz Sosa (1983–84)
- (Spain) Josu Ortuondo (1985–86)
- (Spain) Vicente Carlos Campillo (1987–88)
- (Spain) Francisco Parreño (1991–92)
- (Spain) Julio Cardeñosa (1991–92)
- (Spain) Luis Costa (1993)
- (Spain) Sánchez Duque (2001)
- (Spain) José Murcia (2001–02)
- (Spain) Mariano García Remón (2002)
- (Spain) Josu Ortuondo (2002–03)
- (Spain) Fernando Zambrano (2003)
- (Spain) Fernando Castro Santos (2003)
- (Spain) Miguel Ángel Portugal (2003–04)
- (Spain) Roberto (2004)
- (Spain) Esteban Vigo (2004)
- (Spain) Quique Hernández (1 July 2005 – 1 Oct 2005)
- (Spain) Paco Jémez (1 July 2007 – 30 May 2008)
- (Spain) José González (2008)
- (Spain) Juan Luna Eslava (9 Dec 2008 – 30 June 2009)
- (Spain) Lucas Alcaraz (1 July 2009 – 30 June 2011)
- (Spain) Paco Jémez (1 July 2011 – 13 June 2012)
- (Spain) Rafael Berges (1 July 2012 – 8 April 2013)
- (Argentina) Juan Esnáider (13 April 2013 – 30 June 2013)
- (Spain) Pablo Villa (1 July 2013 – 9 Feb 2014)
- (Spain) Luis Carrión (interim) (9 Feb 2014 – 16 Feb 2014)
- (Spain) Albert Ferrer (17 Feb 2014 – 20 Oct 2014)
- (Serbia) Miroslav Đukić (20 Oct 2014 – 16 March 2015)
- (Spain) José Antonio Romero (interim) (2015)
- (Spain) José Luis Oltra (2015–16)
