= 2019–20 Racing de Santander season =

Racing de Santander
2019–20 season
- President: Alfredo Pérez
- Head coach: José Luis Oltra
- Stadium: El Sardinero
- Segunda División: 22nd (relegated)
- Copa del Rey: First round
Home colours	Away colours	Third colours

The 2019–20 season was Racing de Santander's 90th season in existence and the club's first season in the second division of Spanish football. In addition to the domestic league, Racing Santander participated in this season's edition of the Copa del Rey. The season was slated to cover a period from 1 July 2019 to 30 June 2020. It was extended extraordinarily beyond 30 June due to the COVID-19 pandemic in Spain.

== Players ==
=== Current squad ===
As of 31 January 2020

Note: Flags indicate national team as defined under FIFA eligibility rules; some limited exceptions apply. Players may hold more than one non-FIFA nationality.

No.	Pos.	Nation	Player
1	GK	ESP	Iván Crespo (captain)
2	DF	ESP	Aitor Buñuel
3	DF	ESP	Moi Delgado (on loan from Valladolid)
4	DF	ESP	Iñaki Olaortua
5	MF	ESP	Nando García
7	MF	ESP	Nico Hidalgo
8	MF	BEL	Aristote Nkaka (on loan from Anderlecht)
9	FW	ESP	Jon Ander
10	MF	ESP	Álvaro Cejudo
11	FW	ESP	Borja Galán (on loan from Coruña)
12	DF	ESP	David Carmona (on loan from Cádiz)
13	GK	FRA	Luca Zidane (on loan from Real Madrid)
14	MF	GEO	Giorgi Papunashvili (on loan from Real Zaragoza)

No.	Pos.	Nation	Player
15	FW	ESP	David Rodríguez
16	MF	ESP	Daniel Toribio (on loan from Alcorcón)
17	MF	FRA	Enzo Lombardo (on loan from Mallorca)
18	FW	ESP	David Barral
19	FW	ESP	Guillermo
20	MF	ESP	Mario Ortiz
21	DF	ESP	Jordi Figueras
22	DF	ESP	Abraham Minero
23	MF	BEL	Ritchie Kitoko
24	DF	ESP	Alexis
30	DF	ESP	Manu Hernando (on loan from Real Madrid)
31	GK	ESP	Lucas Díaz

=== Reserve team ===
Note: Flags indicate national team as defined under FIFA eligibility rules; some limited exceptions apply. Players may hold more than one non-FIFA nationality.

No.	Pos.	Nation	Player
26	FW	ESP	Javi Siverio
27	DF	ESP	Íñigo Sainz-Maza
28	FW	ESP	Rafa Tresaco
32	DF	ESP	Miguel Goñi

No.	Pos.	Nation	Player
33	MF	ESP	Martín Solar
34	MF	ESP	Marco Camus
35	GK	ESP	Germán

=== Out on loan ===
Note: Flags indicate national team as defined under FIFA eligibility rules; some limited exceptions apply. Players may hold more than one non-FIFA nationality.

No.	Pos.	Nation	Player
—	GK	ESP	Jagoba Zárraga (at Rayo Majadahonda until 30 June 2020)
—	DF	ESP	Óscar Gil (at Atlético Baleares until 30 June 2020)

== Pre-season and friendlies ==
Win Draw Loss

20 July 2019 Friendly	Real Sociedad	0–1	Racing Santander	Zarautz, Spain
19:00 CEST (UTC+2)		Report	Díaz 36'	Stadium: Estadio Asti Kirol Instalakuntzak

27 July 2019 Friendly	Valladolid	1–0	Racing Santander	Medina de Rioseco, Spain
19:45 CEST (UTC+2)	Plano 79'			Stadium: Estadio Juan Carlos Navarro

3 August 2019 Friendly	Alavés	1–0	Racing Santander	Guardia, Spain
18:30 CEST (UTC+2)				Stadium: Campo de Futbol El Prao

4 August 2019 Friendly	Racing Santander	2–1	Athletic Bilbao	Santander, Spain
20:00 CEST (UTC+2)	Yoda 10'; Moi 88'	Report	Olaortua 85' (o.g.)	Stadium: El Sardinero; Referee: José Antonio López Toca

== Competitions ==
=== Overview ===
Competition	First match	Last match	Starting round	Final position	Record							
Competition	First match	Last match	Starting round	Final position	Pld	W	D	L	GF	GA	GD	Win %
Segunda División	18 August 2019	20 July 2020	Matchday 1	22nd	42	5	18	19	39	56	−17	11.90
Copa del Rey	17 December 2019		First round	First round	1	0	0	1	0	1	−1	0.00
Total					43	5	18	20	39	57	−18	11.63

Last updated: 20 July 2020
Source: Competitions

=== Segunda División ===
==== League table ====
Pos	Team	Pld	W	D	L	GF	GA	GD	Pts	Promotion, qualification or relegation
18	Ponferradina	42	12	15	15	45	50	−5	51 (Note: Ponferradina finished ahead of Deportivo La Coruña on head-to-head goal difference: Ponferradina 2–0 Deportivo La Coruña, Deportivo La Coruña 2–1 Ponferradina.)	
19	Deportivo La Coruña (R)	42	12	15	15	43	60	−17	51	Relegation to Segunda División B
20	Numancia (R)	42	13	11	18	45	53	−8	50	Relegation to Segunda División B
21	Extremadura (R)	42	10	13	19	43	59	−16	43	Relegation to Segunda División B
22	Racing Santander (R)	42	5	18	19	39	56	−17	33	Relegation to Segunda División B

Source: LaLiga Soccerway
Rules for classification: 1) points; 2) head-to-head points; 3) head-to-head goal difference; 4) goal difference; 5) number of goals scored
(R) Relegated

==== Results summary ====
Overall								Home						Away					
Pld	W	D	L	GF	GA	GD	Pts	W	D	L	GF	GA	GD	W	D	L	GF	GA	GD
42	5	18	19	39	56	−17	33	3	9	9	25	29	−4	2	9	10	14	27	−13

Last updated: 20 July 2020.
Source: La Liga SmartBank

==== Results by round ====
Round	1	2	3	4	5	6	7	8	9	10	11	12	13	14	15	16	17	18	19	20	21	22	23	24	25	26	27	28	29	30	31	32	33	34	35	36	37	38	39	40	41	42
Ground	H	H	A	H	A	H	A	H	A	H	A	A	H	A	H	A	H	A	H	A	H	A	A	H	A	H	A	H	A	H	A	H	A	H	A	H	A	H	A	H	A	H
Result	L	D	D	L	L	W	D	D	D	L	D	D	D	L	D	D	W	L	D	L	D	D	L	D	L	D	W	L	L	D	W	L	D	L	D	L	L	L	L	W	L	L
Position	18	20	18	20	20	18	16	17	18	18	20	21	21	21	21	21	18	20	20	21	21	21	22	22	22	22	22	22	22	22	22	22	22	22	22	22	22	22	22	22	22	22

Updated to match(es) played on 20 July 2020. Source: La Liga SmartBank
A = Away; H = Home; W = Win; D = Draw; L = Loss

==== Matches ====
The fixtures were revealed on 4 July 2019.

17 August 2019 1	Racing Santander	0–1	Málaga	Santander
18:00 CEST (UTC+2)	Mario Ortiz (yellow card) 41' (yellow-red card) 90'; Buñuel (yellow card) 50'	Report	Boulahroud (yellow card) 40'; Adrián 85' (yellow card) 86'	Stadium: El Sardinero; Attendance: 12,515; Referee: Aitor Gorostegui Fernández

24 August 2019 2	Racing Santander	1–1	Almería	Santander
18:00 CEST	Yoda 29'; Buñuel (yellow card) 89'; Sergio Ruiz (yellow card) 90+3'	Report	Romera (yellow card) 38'; Sekou 90+4'	Stadium: El Sardinero; Attendance: 11,402; Referee: Óliver De la Fuente Ramos

31 August 2019 3	Las Palmas	2–2	Racing Santander	Las Palmas
21:00 CEST	Artiles (yellow card) 5' (yellow-red card) 76'; Mantovani (yellow card) 17'; Kirian Rodríguez (yellow card) 68'; Castro 82' (pen.), 89'; Ruiz de Galarreta (yellow card) 90+6'	Report	Yoda 19', (yellow card) 23'; Minero (yellow card) 38'; Olaortua (yellow card) 80'; Cejudo 90+6'	Stadium: Estadio Gran Canaria; Attendance: 12,839; Referee: Álvaro Moreno

6 September 2019 4	Racing Santander	1–2	Cádiz	Santander
21:00 CEST (UTC+2)	Barral 85'	Report	Perea 34'; Álex 90+11' (pen.)	Stadium: Campos de Sport de El Sardinero; Attendance: 10,389; Referee: Javier Iglesias Villanueva

13 September 2019 5	Rayo Vallecano	2–0	Racing Santander	Madrid
21:00 CEST (UTC+2)	Martín Pascual (yellow card) 11' (yellow-red card) 30'; Saveljich 17'; Ulloa (yellow card) 40'; Luna (yellow card) 79'; Bebé 90+5'	Report	Nkaka (yellow card) 23' (yellow-red card) 34'	Stadium: Vallecas; Attendance: 9,450; Referee: Alejandro Muñiz Ruiz

17 September 2019 6	Racing Santander	4–0	Mirandés	Santander
19:00 CEST (UTC+2)	Marong 23', 26'; Rodríguez 59'; Yoda 71'; Barral (yellow card) 74'	Report	González (yellow card) 28'; David González (yellow card) 53' (yellow-red card) 88'; Malsa (yellow card) 75'	Stadium: El Sardinero; Attendance: 12,305; Referee: Iñaki Vicandi Garrido

22 September 2019 7	Sporting Gijón	1–1	Racing Santander	Gijón
18:00 CEST (UTC+2)	Salvador (yellow card) 19'; Méndez 40', (yellow card) 72'; Molinero (yellow card) 68'; García (yellow card) 92'; López (yellow card) 94'	Report	Figueras (yellow card) 21'; Alexis (yellow card) 52'; Yoda 70'	Stadium: El Molinón; Attendance: 22,072; Referee: Gorostegui Fernández-Ortega

28 September 2019 8	Racing Santander	0–0	Numancia	Santander
20:00 CEST (UTC+2)	Moi (yellow card) 10'; Figueras (yellow card) 33'	Report	Calero (yellow card) 18'; Marín (yellow card) 23'	Stadium: El Sardinero; Attendance: 12,534; Referee: Iosu Galech Apezteguía

1 October 2019 9	Albacete	0–0	Racing Santander	Albacete
19:00 CEST (UTC+2)	Barri (yellow card) 13'; Manaj (yellow card) 87'	Report	Lombardo (yellow card) 30'; Mario Ortiz (yellow card) 43'; Nkaka (yellow card) 53'; Cejudo (yellow card) 80'; Alexis (yellow card) 90+3'	Stadium: Estadio Carlos Belmonte; Attendance: 7,891; Referee: Víctor Areces Franco

6 October 2019 10	Racing Santander	0–3	Girona	Santander
20:30 CEST (UTC+2)	Mario Ortiz (yellow card) 12'; Barral (yellow card) 80'	Report	Stuani 5', (yellow card) 81'; Juan Carlos (yellow card) 42'; Gumbau (yellow card) 43', (goal) 70'; Alcalá (yellow card) 58'; Granell 86'; Juanpe (yellow card) 90+4'	Stadium: El Sardinero; Attendance: 12,104; Referee: Dámaso Arcediano Monescillo

13 October 2019 11	Huesca	1–1	Racing Santander	Huesca
18:00 CEST (UTC+2)	Ivi 90+5'	Report	Cejudo 68'; Olaortua (yellow card) 90'	Stadium: El Alcoraz; Attendance: 6,659; Referee: Álvaro Moreno Aragón

20 October 2019 12	Tenerife	3–3	Racing Santander	Santa Cruz de Tenerife
18:00 CEST (UTC+2)	Malbašić 13'; Bermejo 33'; Lasso 50'; Luis Milla (yellow card) 87'	Report	Lombardo 37', 57'; Yoda (yellow card) 63', (goal) 90+3'; Figueras (yellow card) 67'; Buñuel (yellow card) 71'; Cejudo (yellow card) 80'; Olaortua (yellow card) 81'	Stadium: Heliodoro Rodríguez López; Attendance: 8,585; Referee: Santiago Varón Aceitón

26 October 2019 13	Racing Santander	1–1	Deportivo La Coruña	Santander
18:00 CEST (UTC+2)	Yoda 10'; Mario Ortiz (yellow card) 81'; Hidalgo (yellow card) 90+3'	Report	Bóveda (yellow card) 13'; Longo (yellow card) 30'; Koné (yellow card) 65'; Jovanović 67'	Stadium: El Sardinero; Attendance: 14,105; Referee: Rubén Ávalos Barrera

2 November 2019 14	Alcorcón	1–0	Racing Santander	Alcorcón
18:00 CET (UTC+1)	Stoichkov 27'	Report		Stadium: Santo Domingo; Attendance: 2,727; Referee: Saúl Ais Reig

10 November 2019 15	Racing Santander	2–2	Ponferradina	Santander
18:00 CET (UTC+1)	Cejudo 57'; Marong 90'	Report	Isi 67'; Yuri 84' (pen.)	Stadium: El Sardinero; Attendance: 11,731; Referee: Víctor Areces Franco

17 November 2019 16	Lugo	1–1	Racing Santander	Lugo
18:30 CET (UTC+1)	Barreiro 74'	Report	Yoda 31'	Stadium: Anxo Carro; Attendance: 3,163; Referee: Gorka Sagués Oscoz

23 November 2019 17	Racing Santander	3–0	Extremadura	Santander
18:00 CET (UTC+1)	Cejudo 29'; Yoda 70'; Lombardo 86'	Report		Stadium: El Sardinero; Attendance: 9,875; Referee: Luis Mario Milla Alvendiz

1 December 2019 18	Elche	2–0	Racing Santander	Elche
18:00 CET (UTC+1)	Óscar Gil (yellow card) 2'; Qasmi 21'; Nino 51'; Verdú (yellow card) 62'	Report	David Carmona (yellow card) 7'; Alexis (yellow card) 64'; Yoda (yellow card) 75'; Lombardo (yellow card) 90+2'	Stadium: Estadio Manuel Martínez Valero; Attendance: 9,501; Referee: Jorge Figueroa Vázquez

6 December 2019 19	Racing Santander	2–2	Fuenlabrada	Santander
16:00 CET (UTC+1)	Juanma 8' (o.g.); Cejudo 52'	Report	Glauder 78'; Juanma 84'	Stadium: El Sardinero; Attendance: 12,075; Referee: Jon Ander González Esteban

14 December 2019 20	Real Zaragoza	2–0	Racing Santander	Zaragoza
21:00 CET (UTC+1)	Suárez 19', (yellow card) 64'; Nieto (yellow card) 66'; Ros 90+4'	Report	Alexis (yellow card) 36'; Toribio (yellow card) 42'; Barral (yellow card) 79'; Olaortua (yellow card) 90+1'	Stadium: La Romareda; Attendance: 22,480; Referee: Juan Luis Pulido Santana

21 December 2019 21	Racing Santander	1–1	Real Oviedo	Santander
20:00 CET (UTC+1)	Figueras 39'; Moi Delgado (yellow card) 83' (yellow-red card) 90+1'	Report	Arribas (yellow card) 2'; Juanjo Nieto 15', (yellow card) 54'; Bolaño (yellow card) 66'; Tejera (red card) 66'; Ortuño (yellow card) 74'; Nereo (yellow card) 90'	Stadium: El Sardinero; Attendance: 14,537; Referee: Alejandro Muñiz Ruiz

4 January 2020 22	Mirandés	0–0	Racing Santander	Miranda de Ebro
20:00 CET (UTC+1)		Report		Stadium: Anduva; Attendance: 4,058; Referee: Dámaso Arcediano Monescillo

16 January 2020 23	Deportivo La Coruña	2–1	Racing Santander	A Coruña
19:00 CET (UTC+1)	Merino 32'; Çolak 54'	Report	Cejudo 15'	Stadium: Abanca-Riazor; Attendance: 19,055; Referee: Rubén Ávalos Barrera

20 January 2020 24	Racing Santander	1–1	Las Palmas	Santander
18:15 CET (UTC+1)	Ortiz (yellow card) 27'; Moi 53', (yellow card) 59'; Ruiz (yellow card) 55'	Report	Ramírez 90+1' (pen.)	Stadium: Campos de Sport de El Sardinero; Attendance: 10,732; Referee: Javier Iglesias Villanueva

24 January 2020 25	Cádiz	1–0	Racing Santander	Cádiz
21:00 CET (UTC+1)	Juan Cala 90+2'	Report		Stadium: Estadio Ramón de Carranza; Attendance: 11,237; Referee: Óliver de la Fuente Ramos

2 February 2020 26	Racing Santander	1–1	Alcorcón	Santander
20:30 CET (UTC+1)	Figueras 61'	Report	Stoichkov 10'	Stadium: El Sardinero; Attendance: 14,154; Referee: Jorge Figueroa Vázquez

7 February 2020 27	Almería	0–1	Racing Santander	Almería
21:00 CET		Report	Cejudo 14'	Stadium: Juegos Mediterráneos; Attendance: 9,482; Referee: Jon Ander González Esteban

16 February 2020 28	Racing Santander	0–2	Sporting Gijón	Santander
18:15 CET	Olaortua (yellow card) 86'	Report	Bogdan (yellow card) 11'; Murilo 40'; Molinero (yellow card) 70'; Damián Pérez (yellow card) 83'; Carmona 89' (pen.)	Stadium: El Sardinero; Attendance: 20,158; Referee: Ortiz Arias

23 February 2020 29	Málaga	2–0	Racing Santander	Soria
18:15 CET (UTC+1)	Tete 29'; Lombán 39'	Report		Stadium: Los Pajaritos; Attendance: 24,873; Referee: Óliver de la Fuente Ramos

29 February 2020 30	Racing Santander	2–2	Real Zaragoza	Santander
21:00 CET (UTC+1)	Figueras (yellow card) 51'; Cejudo 57'; Rodríguez 77' (pen.); Minero (yellow card) 82' (yellow-red card) 88'	Report	Guti (yellow card) 60' (yellow-red card) 90+4', (goal) 62'; El Yamiq (yellow card) 70'; Álvarez (yellow card) 75'; Blanco 90'	Stadium: Campos de Sport de El Sardinero; Attendance: 11,263; Referee: Aitor Gorostegui Fernández-Ortega

7 March 2020 31	Numancia	1–2	Racing Santander	Soria
18:15 CET (UTC+1)	Noguera 90+2'	Report	Derik 62' (o.g.); Hernando 72'	Stadium: Los Pajaritos; Attendance: 3,786; Referee: Víctor Areces Franco

13 June 2020 32	Racing Santander	1–2	Lugo	Santander
17:00 CEST (UTC+2)	Cejudo 12'	Report	Hacen 58'; Pita 70'	Stadium: Campos de Sport de El Sardinero; Attendance: 0 Referee: Daniel Ocón Arráiz

16 June 2020 33	Girona	0–0	Racing Santander	Girona
21:45 CEST (UTC+2)		Report		Stadium: Montilivi; Attendance: 0 Referee: Daniel Jesús Trujillo Suárez

21 June 2020 34	Racing Santander	1–2	Tenerife	Santander
17:00 CEST (UTC+2)	Jon Ander 90+3'	Report	Joselu 10'; Bermejo 52'	Stadium: El Sardinero; Attendance: 0 Referee: Javier Iglesias Villanueva

24 June 2020 35	Ponferradina	1–1	Racing Santander	Ponferrada
21:45 CEST (UTC+2)	Yuri 29'	Report	Nando 9'	Stadium: El Toralín; Attendance: 0 Referee: Víctor Areces Franco

27 June 2020 36	Racing Santander	1–2	Albacete	Oviedo
21:45 CEST (UTC+2)	Galán 47'	Report	Fuster 54'; Álvaro 81'	Stadium: Carlos Tartiere; Attendance: 0 Referee: Aitor Gorostegui Fernández-Ortega

1 July 2020 37	Extremadura	3–1	Racing Santander	Almendralejo
21:45 CEST (UTC+2)	Pinchi 39'; Rocha 49' (pen.); Zarfino 63'	Report	Guillermo 75'	Stadium: Francisco de la Hera; Attendance: 0 Referee: Santiago Varón Aceitón

4 July 2020 38	Racing Santander	1–2	Elche	Santander
17:00 CEST (UTC+2)	Guillermo 33'	Report	Fidel 63' (pen.); Jonathas 72'	Stadium: El Sardinero; Attendance: 0 Referee: Juan Luis Pulido Santana

7 July 2020 39	Fuenlabrada	1–0	Racing Santander	Fuenlabrada
20:30 CEST (UTC+2)	Riera 63'; Cristóbal (yellow card) 87'	Report	Camus (yellow card) 28'; Cejudo (yellow card) 90+5'	Stadium: Fernando Torres; Attendance: 0 Referee: Luis Mario Milla Alvendiz

11 July 2020 40	Racing Santander	1–0	Huesca	Santander
17:00 CEST (UTC+2)	Guillermo 26'; Moi (yellow card) 90+1'	Report	Mboula (yellow card) 66'	Stadium: El Sardinero; Attendance: 0 Referee: Javier Iglesias Villanueva

17 July 2020 41	Real Oviedo	1–0	Racing Santander	Oviedo
21:00 CEST (UTC+2)	Obeng 7'	Report		Stadium: Carlos Tartiere; Attendance: 0 Referee: Daniel Jesús Trujillo Suárez

20 July 2020 42	Racing Santander	1–2	Rayo Vallecano	Santander
21:00 CEST (UTC+2)	Siverio 44'	Report	García 50'; Suárez 63' (pen.)	Stadium: El Sardinero; Attendance: 0 Referee: Jon Ander González Esteban

=== Copa del Rey ===
17 December 2019 First round	Murcia	1–0	Racing Santander	Murcia
21:00 CET (UTC+1)	Juanma 7'	Report		Stadium: Enrique Roca; Attendance: 4,874; Referee: Santiago Varón Aceitón
