= 2015–16 AD Alcorcón season =

AD Alcorcón
2015–16 season
- Owner: Roland Duchâtelet
- Manager: J. López Muñiz
- Stadium: Santo Domingo
Home colours	Away colours

The 2015–16 season is the 44th season in AD Alcorcón ’s history and the 6th in the second-tier.

== Squad ==
Note: Flags indicate national team as defined under FIFA eligibility rules; some limited exceptions apply. Players may hold more than one non-FIFA nationality.

No.	Pos.	Nation	Player
1	GK	(Serbia) SRB	Marko Dmitrović (on loan from Charlton)
2	DF	(Argentina) ARG	Fede Vega
3	DF	(Togo) TOG	Djené Dakonam
4	DF	(Spain) ESP	Rafa Páez
5	DF	(Romania) ROU	Răzvan Ochiroșii
6	DF	(Spain) ESP	Chema Rodríguez
7	FW	(Spain) ESP	David Rodríguez
8	MF	(Spain) ESP	Rubén Sanz (Captain)
9	FW	(Spain) ESP	Máyor
10	MF	(Spain) ESP	Antonio Martínez
11	MF	(Spain) ESP	Juan José Collantes
12	MF	(Spain) ESP	Josan
13	GK	(Spain) ESP	Dani Jiménez
14	MF	(Spain) ESP	Álvaro Rey

No.	Pos.	Nation	Player
15	FW	(Spain) ESP	Sergi Guardiola
16	DF	(Spain) ESP	Carlos Bellvís
17	MF	(Spain) ESP	Fausto Tienza
18	MF	(Spain) ESP	Daniel Toribio
19	DF	(Spain) ESP	Mikel Iribas
20	FW	(Spain) ESP	Marc Nierga
21	FW	(Spain) ESP	Óscar Plano
22	DF	(Portugal) POR	Nélson Marcos
23	MF	(Spain) ESP	Sergio Rodríguez
24	MF	(Spain) ESP	José Campaña (on loan from Sampdoria)
25	MF	(Spain) ESP	Natxo Insa
28	DF	(Spain) ESP	Fernando
30	MF	(Spain) ESP	Víctor Pastrana

=== Out on loan ===
Note: Flags indicate national team as defined under FIFA eligibility rules; some limited exceptions apply. Players may hold more than one non-FIFA nationality.

No.	Pos.	Nation	Player
—	DF	(Spain) ESP	Adrián Jiménez (on loan at Toledo)
—	DF	(Spain) ESP	Ramiro Mayor (on loan at Guijuelo)

== Competitions ==
=== Overall ===
Competition	Final position
Segunda División	7th
Copa del Rey	2nd round

=== Liga ===
==== League table ====
Pos	Team	Pld	W	D	L	GF	GA	GD	Pts	Promotion, qualification or relegation
5	Córdoba	42	19	8	15	59	52	+7	65	Qualification to promotion play-offs
6	Osasuna (O, P)	42	17	13	12	47	40	+7	64 (Note: Osasuna ahead of Alcorcón and Zaragoza on head-to-head record; Osasuna 7 points, Alcorcón 6 points, Zaragoza 4 points)	Qualification to promotion play-offs
7	Alcorcón	42	18	10	14	48	44	+4	64	
8	Zaragoza	42	17	13	12	50	44	+6	64	
9	Oviedo	42	16	11	15	52	51	+1	59	

Source: LFP
Rules for classification: 1) points; 2) head-to-head points; 3) head-to-head goal difference; 4) goal difference; 5) number of goals scored
(O) Play-off winners; (P) Promoted

==== Matches ====
Kickoff times are in CET. Win Draw Loss

Match	Opponent	Result
1	Mallorca	2–0
2	Valladolid	2–0
3	Córdoba	1–3
4	Ponferradina	1–0
5	Athletic B	1–0
6	Numancia	1–1
7	Gimnàstic	0–2
8	Huesca	0–1
9	Oviedo	3–2
10	Llagostera	6–1
11	Mirandés	3–0
12	Almería	0–0
13	Leganés	3–0
14	Zaragoza	1–0
15	Osasuna	1–2
16	Lugo	1–1
17	Alavés	1–1
18	Albacete	1–0
19	Tenerife	1–2
20	Girona	1–0
21	Elche	2–0

Match	Opponent	Result
22	Mallorca	1–0
23	Valladolid	0–0
24	Córdoba	3–3
25	Ponferradina	0–0
26	Athletic B	1–0
27	Numancia	1–1
28	Gimnàstic	1–1
29	Huesca	1–0
30	Oviedo	1–0
31	Llagostera	4–0
32	Mirandés	1–0
33	Almería	1–1
34	Leganés	2–0
35	Zaragoza	3–1
36	Osasuna	0–1
37	Lugo	1–2
38	Alavés	0–1
39	Albacete	0–2
40	Tenerife	2–1
41	Girona	2–0
42	Elche	4–1

=== Copa del Rey ===
==== Second round ====
Match	Opponent	Result
1	Ponferradina	0–1
