= 2016–17 AD Alcorcón season =

AD Alcorcón
2016–17 season
- Owner: Roland Duchâtelet
- Chairman: Ignacio Legido
- Manager: Cosmin Contra (1-9); Julio Velázquez (10-42)
- Stadium: Santo Domingo
- Segunda División: 18th
- Copa del Rey: Quarter-finals
| Home colours | Away colours | Third colours |

The 2016–17 season is the 45th season in AD Alcorcón ’s history.

== Squad ==
As of 1 February 2017

Note: Flags indicate national team as defined under FIFA eligibility rules; some limited exceptions apply. Players may hold more than one non-FIFA nationality.

| No. | Pos. | Nation | Player |
|---|---|---|---|
| 1 | GK | (Serbia) SRB | Marko Dmitrović |
| 2 | DF | (Argentina) ARG | Fede Vega |
| 3 | DF | (Spain) ESP | David Navarro |
| 4 | DF | (Spain) ESP | Rafa Páez |
| 5 | DF | (Romania) ROU | Răzvan Ochiroșii |
| 6 | MF | (Spain) ESP | Daniel Toribio |
| 7 | FW | (Spain) ESP | David Rodríguez (2nd captain) |
| 10 | MF | (Spain) ESP | Pablo Pérez (on loan from Sporting Gijón) |
| 11 | FW | (Spain) ESP | Álvaro Giménez |
| 12 | MF | (Spain) ESP | Víctor Pérez (on loan from Valladolid) |
| 13 | GK | (Spain) ESP | Dani Jiménez |

| No. | Pos. | Nation | Player |
|---|---|---|---|
| 15 | MF | (Algeria) ALG | Foued Kadir |
| 16 | DF | (Spain) ESP | Carlos Bellvís (4th captain) |
| 17 | MF | (Spain) ESP | Iván Alejo |
| 18 | DF | (Spain) ESP | Unai Elgezabal (on loan from Eibar) |
| 19 | MF | (Argentina) ARG | Martín Luque (on loan from Internacional) |
| 20 | MF | (Spain) ESP | Tropi (on loan from Valencia) |
| 21 | FW | (Spain) ESP | Óscar Plano (Captain) |
| 22 | DF | (Portugal) POR | Nélson |
| 23 | MF | (Montenegro) MNE | Marko Bakić (on loan from Braga) |
| 24 | DF | (Cameroon) CMR | Lucien Owona |

=== Transfers ===
- List of Spanish football transfers summer 2016#Alcorcón
- List of Spanish football transfers winter 2016–17

== Competitions ==
=== Overall ===
| Competition | Final position |
|---|---|
| Segunda División | 18th |
| Copa del Rey | Quarter-finals |

=== Liga ===
==== League table ====
| Pos | Team | Pld | W | D | L | GF | GA | GD | Pts | Promotion, qualification or relegation |
|---|---|---|---|---|---|---|---|---|---|---|
| 16 | Zaragoza | 42 | 12 | 14 | 16 | 50 | 52 | −2 | 50 (Note: Zaragoza and Numancia finished ahead of Alcorcón on head-to-head points: Zaragoza 7 pts, Numancia 7 pts, Alcorcón 2 pts. Zaragoza finished ahead of Numancia on head-to-head goal difference: Numancia 2–1 Zaragoza, Zaragoza 3–0 Numancia) | |
| 17 | Numancia | 42 | 11 | 17 | 14 | 40 | 49 | −9 | 50 | |
| 18 | Alcorcón | 42 | 13 | 11 | 18 | 32 | 43 | −11 | 50 | |
| 19 | UCAM Murcia (R) | 42 | 11 | 15 | 16 | 42 | 51 | −9 | 48 | Relegation to Segunda División B |
| 20 | Mallorca (R) | 42 | 9 | 18 | 15 | 42 | 50 | −8 | 45 | Relegation to Segunda División B |

Source: La Liga
Rules for classification: 1) points; 2) head-to-head points; 3) head-to-head goal difference; 4) goal difference; 5) number of goals scored
(R) Relegated

==== Matches ====
Kickoff times are in CET. Win Draw Loss

| Match | Opponent | Venue | Result |
|---|---|---|---|
| 1 | Huesca | H | 0–0 |
| 2 | Levante | A | 2–0 |
| 3 | Numancia | A | 1–1 |
| 4 | Nàstic | H | 1–0 |
| 5 | Zaragoza | A | 2–0 |
| 6 | Córdoba | H | 0–1 |
| 7 | Sevilla At | A | 1–1 |
| 8 | Elche | H | 1–0 |
| 9 | Valladolid | A | 2–0 |
| 10 | Almería | H | 0–0 |
| 11 | Mallorca | A | 1–0 |
| 12 | Mirandés | H | 1–0 |
| 13 | Getafe | A | 1–0 |
| 14 | Reus | H | 1–0 |
| 15 | Cádiz | A | 4–1 |
| 16 | Oviedo | H | 5–1 |
| 17 | Rayo | A | 2–0 |
| 18 | Girona | H | 2–1 |
| 19 | Tenerife | A | 2–0 |
| 20 | UCAM | H | 0–0 |
| 21 | Lugo | A | 1–0 |

| Match | Opponent | Venue | Result |
|---|---|---|---|
| 22 | Huesca | A | 0–1 |
| 23 | Levante | H | 2–0 |
| 24 | Numancia | H | 2–3 |
| 25 | Nàstic | A | 1–1 |
| 26 | Zaragoza | H | 1–1 |
| 27 | Córdoba | A | 1–0 |
| 28 | Sevilla At | H | 0–0 |
| 29 | Elche | A | 0–0 |
| 30 | Valladolid | H | 1–2 |
| 31 | Almería | A | 3–1 |
| 32 | Mallorca | H | 1–0 |
| 33 | Mirandés | A | 2–0 |
| 34 | Getafe | H | 0–3 |
| 35 | Reus | A | 0–0 |
| 36 | Cádiz | H | 0–2 |
| 37 | Oviedo | A | 0–1 |
| 38 | Rayo | H | 2–0 |
| 39 | Girona | A | 0–0 |
| 40 | Tenerife | H | 1–3 |
| 41 | UCAM | A | 0–1 |
| 42 | Lugo | H | 3–0 |

=== Copa del Rey ===
==== Round of 32 ====
| Team 1 | Agg. | Team 2 | 1st leg | 2nd leg |
|---|---|---|---|---|
| Alcorcón | 2–2 (4–3 p) | Espanyol | 1–1 | 1–1 (a.e.t.) |

==== Round of 16 ====
| Team 1 | Agg. | Team 2 | 1st leg | 2nd leg |
|---|---|---|---|---|
| Alcorcón | 2–1 | Córdoba | 0–0 | 2–1 |

==== Quarter-finals ====
| Team 1 | Agg. | Team 2 | 1st leg | 2nd leg |
|---|---|---|---|---|
| Alcorcón | 0–2 | Alavés | 0–2 | 0–0 |
