= 2023 Segunda Federación play-offs =

The 2023 Segunda Federación play-offs (Playoffs de Ascenso or Promoción de Ascenso) are the final play-offs for promotion from 2022–23 Segunda Federación to the 2023–24 Primera Federación.

== Format ==
Twenty teams participated in the promotion play-off. Each of the five groups of the Segunda División RFEF were represented by the four teams that finished the regular season between the second and fifth positions. In the draw for the first stage, the participating teams were assigned to pots corresponding to their final regular season position. While avoiding matches between teams from the same regular season group, second-place finishers were drawn against fifth-place finishers while teams that finished third would play teams that finished fourth. The same draw process was repeated, to the extent that it would be possible, in the draw for the second round.

The five winning clubs of the second stage attained promotion to Primera RFEF and accompanied the five group champions who had already achieved their promotion.

The final two relegation spots (of 27 total) were also determined via play-offs. The four 13th-place finishers with the lowest point totals were drawn into two single-leg matches, with the winners securing survival in the Segunda División RFEF and the losers being relegated to the Tercera División RFEF. The two match-ups were selected through a random draw and hosted at a venue chosen from among the stadiums selected to host the promotion play-offs.

As of this season, the RFEF recovered the two-legged knockout system, due to the complaints filed against the single knockout system at a neutral venue that had been implemented after COVID-19 and the subsequent reform of the football leagues organized by the RFEF.

== Promotion play-offs ==
=== Teams ===
==== Participating teams ====
- Alavés B
- Atlético Madrid B
- Atlético Sanluqueño
- Avilés Industrial
- Cacereño
- Compostela
- Espanyol B
- Gernika
- Gimnástica Segoviana
- Manresa
- Navalcarnero
- Peña Deportiva
- Recreativo Granada
- Recreativo Huelva
- Tarazona
- UCAM Murcia
- Utebo
- Valencia Mestalla
- Valladolid Promesas
- Zamora

==== Road to the play-offs ====
===== Group 1 =====
Pos	Team	Pld	W	D	L	GF	GA	GD	Pts	Qualification
2	Avilés Industrial	34	17	8	9	45	30	+15	**59**	Qualification for the promotion play-offs and Copa del Rey
3	Valladolid Promesas	34	16	8	10	49	41	+8	**56**	Qualification for the promotion play-offs
4	Compostela	34	14	12	8	42	27	+15	**54 (Note: Head-to-head points: Compostela 8, Zamora 4, Guijuelo 4. Zamora finished ahead of Guijuelo on head-to-head goal difference: Zamora–Guijuelo 3–0, Guijuelo–Zamora 1–0)**	Qualification for the promotion play-offs and Copa del Rey
5	Zamora	34	15	9	10	38	33	+5	**54**	Qualification for the promotion play-offs and Copa del Rey

Updated to match(es) played on 14 May 2023. Source:
Rules for classification: 1) points; 2) head-to-head points; 3) head-to-head goal difference; 4) goal difference; 5) number of goals scored

===== Group 2 =====
Pos	Team	Pld	W	D	L	GF	GA	GD	Pts	Qualification
2	Alavés B	34	16	11	7	40	23	+17	**59**	Qualification for the promotion play-offs
3	Tarazona (P)	34	16	8	10	60	37	+23	**56**	Qualification for the promotion play-offs and Copa del Rey
4	Utebo	34	14	11	9	39	32	+7	**53 (Note: Utebo finished ahead of Gernika on head-to-head points: Gernika–Utebo 0–2, Utebo–Gernika 0–0)**	Qualification for the promotion play-offs and Copa del Rey
5	Gernika	34	15	8	11	41	31	+10	**53**	Qualification for the promotion play-offs and Copa del Rey

Updated to match(es) played on 14 May 2023. Source:
Rules for classification: 1) points; 2) head-to-head points; 3) head-to-head goal difference; 4) goal difference; 5) number of goals scored
(P) Promoted

===== Group 3 =====
Pos	Team	Pld	W	D	L	GF	GA	GD	Pts	Qualification
2	Peña Deportiva	34	17	10	7	50	27	+23	**61**	Qualification for the promotion play-offs and Copa del Rey
3	Valencia Mestalla	34	16	10	8	50	28	+22	**58**	Qualification for the promotion play-offs
4	Manresa	34	14	12	8	40	32	+8	**54**	Qualification for the promotion play-offs and Copa del Rey
5	Espanyol B	34	14	11	9	39	37	+2	**53**	Qualification for the promotion play-offs

Updated to match(es) played on 14 May 2023. Source:
Rules for classification: 1) points; 2) head-to-head points; 3) head-to-head goal difference; 4) goal difference; 5) number of goals scored

===== Group 4 =====
Pos	Team	Pld	W	D	L	GF	GA	GD	Pts	Qualification
2	Recreativo Huelva (P)	34	17	12	5	39	24	+15	**63**	Qualification for the promotion play-offs and Copa del Rey
3	Recreativo Granada (P)	34	17	8	9	47	32	+15	**59**	Qualification for the promotion play-offs
4	Atlético Sanluqueño (P)	34	16	10	8	47	33	+14	**58**	Qualification for the promotion play-offs and Copa del Rey
5	UCAM Murcia	34	13	15	6	46	27	+19	**54**	Qualification for the promotion play-offs and Copa del Rey

Updated to match(es) played on 14 May 2023. Source:
Rules for classification: 1) points; 2) head-to-head points; 3) head-to-head goal difference; 4) goal difference; 5) number of goals scored
(P) Promoted

===== Group 5 =====
Pos	Team	Pld	W	D	L	GF	GA	GD	Pts	Qualification
2	Atlético Madrid B (P)	34	19	8	7	60	33	+27	**65**	Qualification for the promotion play-offs
3	Navalcarnero	34	19	5	10	46	28	+18	**62**	Qualification for the promotion play-offs and Copa del Rey
4	Cacereño	34	15	10	9	35	23	+12	**55**	Qualification for the promotion play-offs and Copa del Rey
5	Gimnástica Segoviana	34	14	10	10	48	44	+4	**52**	Qualification for the promotion play-offs and Copa del Rey

Updated to match(es) played on 14 May 2023. Source:
Rules for classification: 1) points; 2) head-to-head points; 3) head-to-head goal difference; 4) goal difference; 5) number of goals scored
(P) Promoted

=== First round ===
==== Qualified teams ====
Group	Position	Team
1	2nd	**Avilés Industrial**
2	2nd	**Alavés B**
3	2nd	Peña Deportiva
4	2nd	**Recreativo Huelva**
5	2nd	**Atlético Madrid B**

Group	Position	Team
1	3rd	Valladolid Promesas
2	3rd	**Tarazona**
3	3rd	Valencia Mestalla
4	3rd	**Recreativo Granada**
5	3rd	**Navalcarnero**

Group	Position	Team
1	4th	Compostela
2	4th	Utebo
3	4th	Manresa
4	4th	**Atlético Sanluqueño**
5	4th	**Cacereño**

Group	Position	Team
1	5th	Zamora
2	5th	Gernika
3	5th	Espanyol B
4	5th	**UCAM Murcia**
5	5th	Gimnástica Segoviana

Bold indicates teams that advanced to the second round

==== Matches ====
Team 1	Agg.	Team 2	1st leg	2nd leg
**Atlético Madrid B**	3–0	Espanyol B	1–0	2–0
**Recreativo Huelva**	1–0 (a.e.t.)	Gimnástica Segoviana	0–0	1–0
Peña Deportiva	1–2 (a.e.t.)	**UCAM Murcia**	1–0	0–2
**Alavés B**	4–0	Zamora	0–0	4–0
**Avilés Industrial**	3–0	Gernika	0–0	3–0
**Tarazona**	4–3	Compostela	2–3	2–0
**Recreativo Granada**	5–4	Utebo	2–1	3–3
**Navalcarnero**	2–1	Manresa	0–1	2–0
Valencia Mestalla	0–1	**Cacereño**	0–0	0–1
Valladolid Promesas	2–4	**Atlético Sanluqueño**	1–2	1–2

First leg

20 May 2023	Espanyol B	**0–1**	**Atlético Madrid B**	Sant Adrià de Besòs
19:30 UTC+2		Report	Diego Bri 62'	Stadium: Ciutat Esportiva Dani Jarque; Attendance: 1,400

20 May 2023	Utebo	**1–2**	**Recreativo Granada**	Utebo
19:30 UTC+2	Perez 74'		Omorodion 14'; Juanma 90'	Stadium: Estadio Santa Ana

21 May 2023	**Manresa**	**1–0**	Navalcarnero	Manresa
12:00 UTC+2	Jaume Pascual 58'			Stadium: Nou Estadi Municipal

21 May 2023	**Atlético Sanluqueño**	**2–1**	Valladolid Promesas	Sanlúcar de Barrameda
12:00 UTC+2	Kike 26'; Zequi 40'		Slavy 61'	Stadium: Estadio El Palmar

21 May 2023	**Compostela**	**3–2**	Tarazona	Santiago de Compostela
12:00 UTC+2	Darío Martínez 37'; Mario Rodríguez 51', 56'		Toni Jau 79'; Jaume Rodríguez 90'	Stadium: Estadio Verónica Boquete de San Lázaro

21 May 2023	UCAM Murcia	**0–1**	**Peña Deportiva**	Murcia
12:00 UTC+2			Salinas 82'	Stadium: Estadio de La Condomina

21 May 2023	Gernika	**0–0**	Avilés Industrial	Gernika
17:00 UTC+2				Stadium: Estadio Urbieta

21 May 2023	Gimnástica Segoviana	**0–0**	Recreativo Huelva	Segovia
18:00 UTC+2		Report		Stadium: Estadio Municipal de La Albuera; Attendance: 3,123

21 May 2023	Zamora	**0–0**	Alavés B	Zamora
18:30 UTC+2				Stadium: Estadio Ruta de la Plata

21 May 2023	Cacereño	**0–0**	Valencia Mestalla	Cáceres
20:00 UTC+2				Stadium: Estadio Príncipe Felipe

Second leg

27 May 2023	**Navalcarnero**	**2–0** (**2–1** agg.)	Manresa	Navalcarnero
18:30 UTC+2	Álex Gil 73', 90'			Stadium: Estadio Municipal Mariano González

27 May 2023	Valencia Mestalla	**0–1** (**0–1** agg.)	**Cacereño**	Paterna
19:00 UTC+2			Luis Aguado 88'	Stadium: Estadio Antonio Puchades

27 May 2023	**Tarazona**	**2–0** (**4–3** agg.)	Compostela	Tarazona
20:15 UTC+2	M. Mendes 85', 90'			Stadium: Estadio Municipal de Tarazona

28 May 2023	**Atlético Madrid B**	**2–0** (**3–0** agg.)	Espanyol B	Majadahonda
12:00 UTC+2	J. Boñar 52'; Carlos Martín 75'			Stadium: Estadio Cerro del Espino

28 May 2023	Valladolid Promesas	**1–2** (**4–2** agg.)	**Atlético Sanluqueño**	Valladolid
12:00 UTC+2	Slavy 10'		Zequi 33'; Franco 89'	Stadium: Anexos al Estadio José Zorrilla

28 May 2023	Peña Deportiva	**0–2** (a.e.t.) (**1–2** agg.)	**UCAM Murcia**	Santa Eulària des Riu
12:00 UTC+2			Pito Camacho 9'; Chumbi 103'	Stadium: Estadi Municipal de Santa Eulària des Riu

28 May 2023	**Alavés B**	**4–0** (**4–0** agg.)	Zamora	Vitoria-Gasteiz
17:00 UTC+2	José De León 16'; Marc Tenas 28'; Unai Ropero 45'; J. Panichelli 65'			Stadium: Ciudad Deportiva José Luis Compañón

28 May 2023	Recreativo Granada	**3–3** (**5–4** agg.)	Utebo	Granada
18:00 UTC+2	Omorodion 2', 18'; Solar 80'		Cota 44'; David Marín 85'; Darius Fustos 89'	Stadium: Ciudad Deportiva del Granada CF; Referee: Clemente Manrique

28 May 2023	**Recreativo Huelva**	**1–0** (a.e.t.) (**1–0** agg.)	Gimnástica Segoviana	Huelva
20:00 UTC+2	Mbaye 119'			Stadium: Estadio Nuevo Colombino; Referee: Moreno Osuna

28 May 2023	**Avilés Industrial**	**3–0** (**3–0** agg.)	Gernika	Avilés
20:00 UTC+2	Natalio 57'; Óscar Conde 74'; Jorge Fernández 85'			Stadium: Estadio Román Suárez Puerta

=== Second round ===
==== Qualified teams ====
Group	Position	Team
1	2nd	Avilés Industrial
2	2nd	Alavés B
4	2nd	**Recreativo Huelva**
5	2nd	**Atlético Madrid B**

Group	Position	Team
2	3rd	**Tarazona**
4	3rd	**Recreativo Granada**
5	3rd	Navalcarnero

Group	Position	Team
4	4th	**Atlético Sanluqueño**
5	4th	Cacereño

Group	Position	Team
4	5th	UCAM Murcia

Bold indicates teams that were promoted

==== Matches ====
Team 1	Agg.	Team 2	1st leg	2nd leg
UCAM Murcia	1–1 (seed)	**Atlético Madrid B**	1–1	0–0
Cacereño	1–1 (seed)	**Recreativo Huelva**	0–0	1–1
**Atlético Sanluqueño**	3–0	Alavés B	2–0	1–0
**Recreativo Granada**	3–1	Avilés Industrial	1–1	2–0
**Tarazona**	3–2	Navalcarnero	2–1	1–1

First leg

3 June 2023	**Atlético Sanluqueño**	**2–0**	Alavés B	Sanlúcar de Barrameda
18:00 UTC+2	Airam Cabrera 20'; Alan Godoy 32'			Stadium: Estadio El Palmar

3 June 2023	**Tarazona**	**2–1**	Navalcarnero	Tarazona
20:15 UTC+2	Néstor 19', 46'		Hugo Esteban 61'	Stadium: Estadio Municipal de Tarazona

4 June 2023	Cacereño	**0–0**	Recreativo Huelva	Cáceres
12:00 UTC+2				Stadium: Estadio Príncipe Felipe

4 June 2023	UCAM Murcia	**1–1**	Atlético Madrid B	Murcia
18:30 UTC+2	Pito Camacho 23'		Carlos Martín 59'	Stadium: Estadio de La Condomina

4 June 2023	Recreativo Granada	**1–1**	Avilés Industrial	Granada
19:00 UTC+2	Julito 80'		Álvaro Mayorga 32'	Stadium: Ciudad Deportiva del Granada CF

Second leg

10 June 2023	Navalcarnero	**1–1** (**2–3** agg.)	Tarazona	Navalcarnero
18:00 UTC+2	Jesus Ocaña 87'		Carlos González 87'	Stadium: Estadio Municipal Mariano González

11 June 2023	Atlético Madrid B	**0–0** (**1–1(s)** agg.)	UCAM Murcia	Majadahonda
12:00 UTC+2				Stadium: Estadio Cerro del Espino

- Atlético Madrid B promoted because they won the away goal against UCAM Murcia

11 June 2023	Alavés B	**0–1** (**0–3** agg.)	**Atlético Sanluqueño**	Vitoria-Gasteiz
12:00 UTC+2			Fran Franco 90+2'	Stadium: Ciudad Deportiva José Luis Compañón

11 June 2023	Avilés Industrial	**0–2** (**1–3** agg.)	**Recreativo Granada**	Avilés
18:30 UTC+2			Martín Solar 39'; Omorodion 43'	Stadium: Estadio Román Suárez Puerta

11 June 2023	Recreativo Huelva	**1–1** (**1–1 (s)** agg.)	Cacereño	Huelva
20:00 UTC+2	S. Manchón 6'		Dopico 68'	Stadium: Estadio Nuevo Colombino

- Recreativo Huelva promoted because they won the away goal against Cacereño

== Promoted teams ==
- The five teams that were or would be promoted to Primera Federación through regular season groups and the five play-off winners were included.
- The number of years after the last participation of the club in the third tier is referred to the previous appearance at that level, where Segunda División B was replaced by the Primera Federación.

Promoted to Primera Federación
Group 1	Group 2	Group 3	Group 4	Group 5
Arenteiro (1st) (34 years later)	Sestao River (1st) (6 years later)	Teruel (1st) (4 years later)	Antequera (1st) (14 years later)	Melilla (1st) (2 years later)
	Tarazona (3rd) (2 years later)		Recreativo Huelva (2nd) (2 years later)	Atlético Madrid B (2nd) (2 years later)
			Recreativo Granada (3rd) (2 years later)	
Atlético Sanluqueño (4th) (1 year later)

== Relegation play-offs ==
=== Table of 13th-placed teams ===
Pos	Team	Pld	W	D	L	GF	GA	GD	Pts	Qualification or relegation
1	Vélez	34	13	5	16	41	52	−11	44	
2	Ourense CF	34	11	10	13	36	36	0	43	Won the relegation play-offs
3	Deportivo Aragón	34	11	10	13	36	42	−6	43	Won the relegation play-offs
4	Beasain (R)	34	10	11	13	40	40	0	41	Relegation to Tercera Federación
5	Coria (R)	34	9	12	13	31	43	−12	39	Relegation to Tercera Federación

Updated to match(es) played on 14 May 2023. Source:
Rules for classification: 1) points; 2) goal difference; 3) number of goals scored
(R) Relegated

=== Qualified teams ===
Group	Position	Team
1	13th	Ourense
2	13th	Beasain
3	13th	Deportivo Aragón
5	13th	Coria

=== Matches ===
Team 1	Agg.	Team 2	1st leg	2nd leg
Deportivo Aragón	2–1	Coria	1–0	1–1
Beasain	0–1	Ourense CF	0–0	0–1

21 May 2023
11:30 UTC+2

Deportivo Aragón	1–0	Coria
Navarro 3'

Ciudad Deportiva del Real Zaragoza
21 May 2023
17:00 UTC+2

Beasain	0–0	Ourense CF

Estadio Loinaz

27 May 2023
17:00 UTC+2

Ourense CF	1–0	Beasain
Dani Salas 48'

Estadio O Couto
27 May 2023
20:00 UTC+2

Coria	1–1	Deportivo Aragón
Cerro 32'		Rastrojo 30'

Estadio La Isla

Relegated to Tercera Federación
Beasain	Coria

== Relegated teams ==
- 27 teams relegated to Tercera Federación: 25 teams through regular season groups and the two play-off losers.
- The numbers of years after the last relegation are referred to the last participation of the club in Tercera División or Tercera Federación if the team was promoted one year ago.

Relegated to Tercera Federación
Cristo Atlético (2 years later)	Cirbonero (1 year later)	Prat (4 years later)	Xerez Deportivo (2 years later)	Leganés B (2 years later)	Laredo (3 years later)
Alfaro (1 year later)	Olot (1 year later)	El Ejido (3 years later)	Alcorcón B (1 year later)	Burgos Promesas (2 years later)	UD Logroñés B (2 years later)
Ibiza Islas Pitiusas (2 years later)	Juventud Torremolinos (1 year later)	Diocesano (1 year later)	Polvorín (1 year later)	Racing Rioja (2 years later)	Mallorca B (1 year later)
Atlético Mancha Real (2 years later)	Socuéllamos (3 years later)	Bergantiños (2 years later)	Arnedo (1 year later)	Ebro (8 years later)	Utrera (1 year later)
Don Benito (5 years later)		Coria (2 years later)		Beasain (1 year later)	
