= 2014–15 AD Alcorcón season =

AD Alcorcón
2015–16 season
- Owner: Roland Duchâtelet
- Manager: José Bordalás
- Stadium: Santo Domingo
Home colours

The 2014–15 season is the 43rd season in AD Alcorcón’s history and the 5th in the second-tier.

== Squad ==
As 2015..

Note: Flags indicate national team as defined under FIFA eligibility rules; some limited exceptions apply. Players may hold more than one non-FIFA nationality.

No.	Pos.	Nation	Player
1	GK	ESP	Ismael Falcón
2	MF	URU	Facundo Guichón
3	DF	TOG	Djené Dakonam
4	DF	ESP	Héctor Verdés
5	DF	ESP	Fran Cruz (on loan from Córdoba)
6	DF	ESP	Chema
7	FW	ESP	David Rodríguez
8	MF	ESP	Rubén Sanz (captain)
9	MF	ESP	Kiko Femenía
10	MF	ESP	Sergio Mora
11	MF	ESP	Alberto Escassi
12	MF	CIV	Bobley Anderson (on loan from Málaga)
14	MF	ESP	Álvaro Rey
15	FW	ESP	Máyor

No.	Pos.	Nation	Player
16	DF	ESP	Carlos Bellvís
17	MF	ESP	Fausto Tienza
18	MF	ESP	Antonio Martínez
19	DF	ESP	Mikel Iribas
20	MF	ESP	David González
21	FW	ESP	Óscar Plano
22	MF	ESP	Fernando Usero
23	DF	ESP	Ángel Sánchez
24	DF	ESP	Nagore
25	GK	ESP	Javi Jiménez (on loan from Levante)
30	MF	ESP	Víctor Pastrana
32	GK	ESP	José Pereira
34	DF	ESP	Fernando

== Competitions ==
=== Overall ===
Competition	Final position
Segunda División	11th
Copa del Rey	Second round

=== Liga ===
==== League table ====
Pos	Team	Pld	W	D	L	GF	GA	GD	Pts
9	Llagostera	42	15	12	15	41	41	0	57
10	Leganés	42	15	11	16	48	42	+6	56
11	Alcorcón	42	12	18	12	44	49	−5	54
12	Numancia	42	12	17	13	54	55	−1	53 (Note: Numancia ahead on head-to-head record; Numancia-Alavés 1-0, Alavés-Numancia 0-3)
13	Alavés	42	14	11	17	49	53	−4	53

Source: LFP - Liga Adelante
Rules for classification: 1) points; 2) head-to-head points; 3) head-to-head goal difference; 4) goal difference; 5) number of goals scored

==== Matches ====
Kickoff times are in CET. Win Draw Loss

Match	Opponent	Result
1	Albacete	2–3
2	Girona	1–2
3	Mirandés	1–2
4	Valladolid	0–1
5	Las Palmas	4–1
6	Leganés	1–0
7	R. Huelva	2–0
8	Osasuna	2–1
9	Barcelona B	4–1
10	Zaragoza	1–3
11	Alavés	1–1
12	Llagostera	2–0
13	Mallorca	1–1
14	Lugo	1–0
15	Racing	0–1
16	Sabadell	3–2
17	Tenerife	0–0
18	Sp. Gijón	2–1
19	Betis	0–0
20	Numancia	2–2
21	Ponferradina	1–1

Match	Opponent	Result
22	Albacete	2–3
23	Girona	3–0
24	Mirandés	2–2
25	Valladolid	1–0
26	Las Palmas	0–0
27	Leganés	1–2
28	R. Huelva	1–1
29	Osasuna	1–1
30	Barcelona B	3–1
31	Zaragoza	1–1
32	Alavés	0–1
33	Llagostera	0–0
34	Mallorca	0–0
35	Lugo	0–0
36	Racing	2–0
37	Sabadell	0–1
38	Tenerife	1–1
39	Sp. Gijón	0–0
40	Betis	3–0
41	Numancia	1–1
42	Ponferradina	1–1

=== Copa del Rey ===
==== Second round ====
Match	Opponent	Result
1	Lugo	1–0
