= Rafael Páez =

Spanish footballer

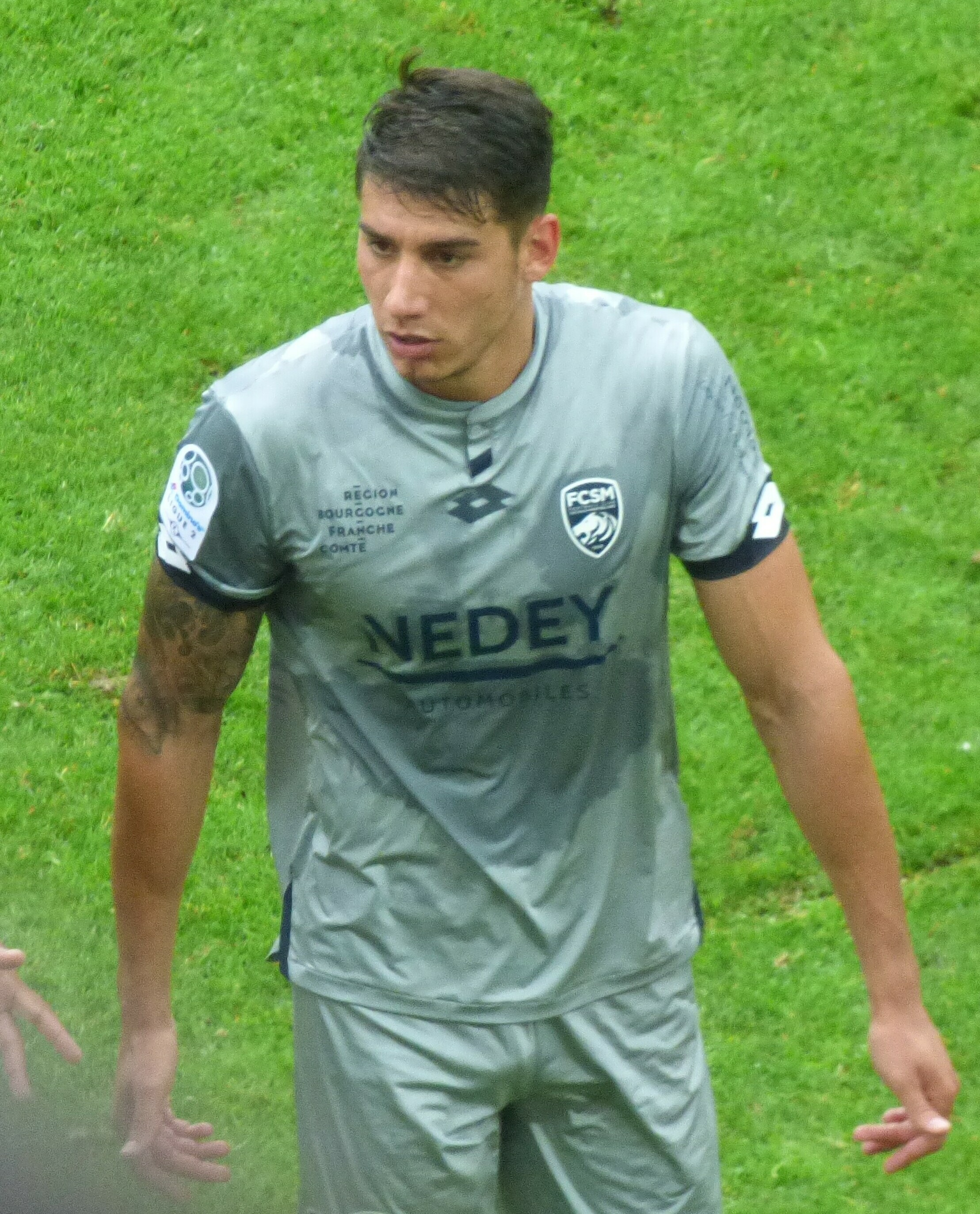
- Páez with Sochaux in 2018

Personal information
- Full name: Rafael Páez Cardona
- Date of birth: 10 August 1994 (age 32)
- Place of birth: Orihuela, Spain
- Height: 1.92 m (6 ft 4 in)
- Position: Centre-back

Team information
- Current team: Mar Menor

Youth career
- 2002–2006: EMF Orihuela
- 2006–2009: Hércules
- 2009–2013: Real Madrid
- 2013–2014: Liverpool

Senior career*
Years	Team	Apps	(Gls)
2014–2015	Liverpool	0	(0)
2014–2015	→ Bologna (loan)	8	(0)
2015	→ Eibar (loan)	0	(0)
2015–2017	Alcorcón	18	(1)
2017–2018	UCAM Murcia	10	(0)
2018–2021	Alavés	0	(0)
2018	→ Rudeš (loan)	10	(0)
2018–2019	→ Sochaux (loan)	11	(0)
2019–2021	→ Istra 1961 (loan)	17	(1)
2021–	Mar Menor	0	(0)
- * Club domestic league appearances and goals as of 3 February 2021

Rafael "Rafa" Páez Cardona (born 10 August 1994) is a Spanish footballer who plays as a centre-back for Mar Menor FC.

== Club career ==
=== Early career ===
Born in Orihuela, Alicante, Valencian Community, Páez joined Hércules CF's youth setup in 2006, aged 12, after starting it out at Escuela Municipal de Fútbol de Orihuela. In October 2009 he moved to Real Madrid, along with three other Hércules teammates.

=== Liverpool ===
In August 2013, Páez was invited into a trial by Liverpool, and impressed during his time at the club. In September he rescinded his link with the Madrid outfit and signed a two-year contract with the Reds, being assigned to the reserves.

Páez appeared in 15 matches for the under-21s during the campaign, scoring two goals (in a 2–4 loss against West Bromwich Albion and in a 5–2 win against Newcastle United), forming a partnership with Lloyd Jones.

==== Bologna (loan) ====
On 7 August 2014, Páez was loaned to Italian Serie B side Bologna in a season-long deal, with an option to buy. He was handed the number 6 jersey for the season.

Páez made his professional debut on 29 August 2014, starting in a 1–2 away loss against Perugia. He appeared in eight league matches for the club (562 minutes of action), but left in January 2015.

==== Eibar (loan) ====
On 30 January 2015, Páez joined La Liga's SD Eibar on loan until June, mainly as a replacement to Derby County-bound Raúl Albentosa. However, he was unable to play for the club, as FIFA blocked the transfer alleging an administrative error by Eibar.

=== Alcorcón ===
On 6 August 2015, Páez signed a permanent deal with Segunda División side AD Alcorcón. He made his debut for the club on 13 September, coming on as a second-half substitute for Víctor Pastrana in a 1–0 home win against SD Ponferradina.

Páez scored his first professional goal on 24 April 2016, netting the first in a 1–3 away loss against Real Zaragoza. On 4 August of the following year, he terminated his contract with the Alfareros.

== Career statistics ==
=== Club ===
As of match played 24 January 2021

Appearances and goals by club, season and competition
Club	Season	League			National Cup		League Cup		Total	
Club	Season	Division	Apps	Goals	Apps	Goals	Apps	Goals	Apps	Goals
Bologna (loan)	2014–15	Serie B	8	0	0	0	—		8	0
Alcorcón	2015–16	Segunda División	8	1	1	0	—		9	1
Alcorcón	2016–17	Segunda División	10	0	3	0	—		13	0
Alcorcón	Total		18	1	4	0	0	0	22	1
UCAM Murcia	2017–18	Segunda División B	10	0	1	0	—		11	0
Rudeš (loan)	2017–18	Prva HNL	10	0	0	0	—		10	0
Sochaux (loan)	2018–19	Ligue 2	11	0	1	0	1	0	13	0
Istra 1961 (loan)	2019–20	Prva HNL	8	1	2	0	—		10	1
Istra 1961 (loan)	2020–21	Prva HNL	9	0	0	0	—		9	0
Istra 1961 (loan)	Total		17	1	2	0	0	0	19	1
Career total			74	2	8	0	1	0	83	2
