= Krasava ENY Ypsonas FC =

Cypriot football club

Krasava Ypsonas
- Full name: Krasava ENY Ypsonas Football Club
- Founded: May 14, 2014; 12 years ago, as Enosi Neon Ypsona-Digenis
- Ground: Stelios Chari Stadium, Ypsonas
- Owner: Yevgeny Savin
- Chairman: Avgoustinos Ioannou
- Manager: Dmytro Chyhrynskyi
- League: First Division
- 2025–26: First Division, 10th of 16
- Website: https://krasavafc.com/
Home colours	Away colours

Old Logo used between 2014–2022

Krasava ENY Ypsonas is a Cypriot professional football club based in Ypsonas of the Limassol District.

Founded in 2014 as ENY Digenis, the team was taken over by Yevgeny Savin in 2022, becoming Krasava ENY Ypsonas. In 2025 the team was promoted to Cypriot First Division.

== History ==
The club was founded in 2014 after the merger of Enosi Neon Ypsona and Digenis Akritas Ipsona. Until May 2019, the name of the club was Enosi Neon Ypsona-Digenis, before changing to Ypsonas FC (Greek: Ένωση Νέων Ύψωνα - Διγενής Ύψωνα). In July 2022, blogger and former footballer Yevgeny Savin, previous owner of FC Krasava, bought the club and became the new owner. After interviews with Andriy Yarmolenko, Andriy Voronin and Darijo Srna on the Russo-Ukrainian War, he was threatened with criminal charges and fled to Cyprus. The club later changed their name and adopted a similar logo to Krasava.

== Players ==
=== Current squad ===
As of 15 September 2026

Note: Flags indicate national team as defined under FIFA eligibility rules; some limited exceptions apply. Players may hold more than one non-FIFA nationality.

No.	Pos.	Nation	Player
3	DF	DOM	Luiyi de Lucas
5	DF	CPV	Kristopher Da Graca
6	DF	ESP	Xavi Quintillà
9	FW	UKR	Yevhen Budnik
10	MF	CYP	Vasilios Papafotis
11	FW	GRE	Michalis Panagidis
12	DF	CYP	Andreas Georgiou
13	FW	CMR	Serge Tabekou
14	MF	ESP	Rubén Pardo
16	MF	FIN	Erik Davidian
17	FW	CYP	Lysandros Papastylianou
18	MF	UKR	Dmytro Melnichenko
19	MF	GHA	Nana Boateng
20	MF	CYP	Andreas Athanasiou

No.	Pos.	Nation	Player
21	FW	MLI	Diby Keita
22	MF	CYP	Panagiotis Angeli
25	GK	CYP	Antreas Christodoulou (on loan from APOEL)
28	MF	FRA	Yassine Bahassa
29	DF	MAR	Issam Chebake
30	DF	CYP	Fanos Katelaris
33	DF	CYP	Konstantinos Venizelou
42	FW	NED	Kevin Brobbey
75	GK	UKR	Yuriy Avramenko
77	DF	GRE	Giannis Kiakos
80	MF	ESP	Marco Camus
93	GK	CZE	Adam Richter
—	FW	UKR	Yevhen Serdyuk
—	DF	NGR	Izuchukwu Anthony
—	MF	SWE	Nikolaos Dosis

=== Out on loan ===
Note: Flags indicate national team as defined under FIFA eligibility rules; some limited exceptions apply. Players may hold more than one non-FIFA nationality.

No.	Pos.	Nation	Player

== Honours ==
- Cypriot Second Division
  - Winners (1): 2024–25

== Historical list of coaches ==
- (Cyprus) Spyros Efstathiou (Jul 1, 2018 – Feb 30, 2020)
- (Cyprus) Loizos Kakoyiannis (Feb 17, 2020 – Nov 15, 2020)
- (Cyprus) Filippos Filippou (Jun 1, 2021 – Dec 6, 2021)
- (Ukraine) Mykola Tsymbal (Sep 7, 2022 – Oct 10, 2022)
- (Russia) Aleksandr Krivoruchko (Oct 10, 2022 – Nov 16, 2022)
- (Cyprus) Nicos Panayiotou (Nov 16, 2022 – Mar 7, 2023)
- (Russia) Aleksandr Krivoruchko (Mar 15, 2023 – Jun 30, 2023)
- (Cyprus) Constantinos Charalambidis (Jul 1, 2023 – Feb 7, 2025)
- (Cyprus) Liasos Louka (Feb 7, 2024 –Aug 1, 2025)
- (North Macedonia) Čedomir Janevski (Aug 12, 2025 – Nov 25, 2025)
- (Cyprus) Konstantinos Rostantis (caretaker) (Nov 30, 2025 –Dec 11, 2025)
- (Spain) Javi Rozada (Dec 11, 2025 – Mar 9, 2026)
- (Cyprus) Konstantinos Rostantis (caretaker) (Mar 10, 2026 –Jul 10, 2026)
- (Ukraine) Dmytro Chyhrynskyi (Jul 10, 2026 –)
