= Ismael Falcón =

Spanish footballer (born 1984)

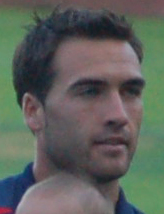
- Falcón with Celta in 2009

Personal information
- Full name: Ismael Gómez Falcón
- Date of birth: 24 April 1984 (age 42)
- Place of birth: Cádiz, Spain
- Height: 1.81 m (5 ft 11 in)
- Position: Goalkeeper

Youth career
- Gaditana
- 1998–2002: Cádiz

Senior career*
Years	Team	Apps	(Gls)
2002–2004	Cádiz B		
2004–2006	Atlético Madrid B	34	(0)
2006–2008	Atlético Madrid	5	(0)
2007	→ Hércules (loan)	11	(0)
2008–2011	Celta	81	(0)
2011–2014	Hércules	109	(0)
2014–2015	Alcorcón	20	(0)
2015–2016	Córdoba	6	(0)
2016–2017	Tenerife	5	(0)
2017–2021	Hércules	127	(0)
2021–2022	Atlético Sanluqueño	36	(0)
2022	San Fernando	4	(0)
Total		438	(0)
- * Club domestic league appearances and goals

Ismael Gómez Falcón (born 24 April 1984) is a Spanish former professional footballer who played as a goalkeeper.

He appeared in 232 Segunda División games over ten seasons, with Hércules (two spells), Celta, Alcorcón, Córdoba and Tenerife. He added five matches in La Liga for Atlético Madrid.

== Club career ==
Falcón was born in Cádiz, Andalusia. After beginning his football career at Cádiz, he was signed by Atlético Madrid aged 20 to finish his development, and he eventually battled for second-choice status for two seasons with another club graduate, Iván Cuéllar, appearing in five La Liga matches in 2005–06, the first being a 1–1 away draw against Athletic Bilbao on 3 December 2005 where he replaced the injured Leo Franco; he also represented the reserves during his tenure.

After a small loan stint in the Segunda División with Hércules, Falcón was released (as Cuéllar) in July 2008 and joined another side at that level, Celta de Vigo. He continued playing in the same league afterwards, with Hércules, Alcorcón, Córdoba and Tenerife.

In June 2021, Falcón agreed to a one-year contract at Atlético Sanluqueño. A year later, he moved to San Fernando also in the Primera Federación, retiring shortly after at 38 to become the latter's goalkeeping coach.

== Career statistics ==
Appearances and goals by club, season and competition
Club	Season	League			National Cup		Other		Total	
Club	Season	Division	Apps	Goals	Apps	Goals	Apps	Goals	Apps	Goals
Atlético Madrid B	2004–05	Segunda División B	4	0	—		—		4	0
Atlético Madrid B	2005–06	Segunda División B	30	0	—		—		30	0
Atlético Madrid B	Total		34	0	—		—		34	0
Atlético Madrid	2005–06	La Liga	5	0	2	0	—		7	0
Atlético Madrid	2006–07	La Liga	0	0	0	0	—		0	0
Atlético Madrid	2007–08	La Liga	0	0	6	0	—		6	0
Atlético Madrid	Total		5	0	8	0	0	0	13	0
Hércules (loan)	2006–07	Segunda División	11	0	4	0	—		15	0
Celta	2008–09	Segunda División	13	0	0	0	—		13	0
Celta	2009–10	Segunda División	35	0	0	0	—		35	0
Celta	2010–11	Segunda División	33	0	0	0	—		33	0
Celta	Total		81	0	0	0	0	0	81	0
Hércules	2011–12	Segunda División	39	0	0	0	0	0	39	0
Hércules	2012–13	Segunda División	37	0	0	0	—		37	0
Hércules	2013–14	Segunda División	33	0	0	0	—		33	0
Hércules	Total		109	0	0	0	0	0	109	0
Alcorcón	2014–15	Segunda División	20	0	0	0	—		20	0
Córdoba	2015–16	Segunda División	6	0	1	0	0	0	7	0
Tenerife	2016–17	Segunda División	5	0	2	0	0	0	7	0
Hércules	2017–18	Segunda División B	37	0	1	0	—		38	0
Hércules	2018–19	Segunda División B	37	0	0	0	6 (Note: Appearances in Segunda División B play-offs)	0	43	0
Hércules	2019–20	Segunda División B	28	0	1	0	—		29	0
Hércules	2020–21	Segunda División B	25	0	0	0	—		25	0
Hércules	Total		127	0	2	0	6	0	135	0
Atlético Sanluqueño	2021–22	Primera División RFEF	36	0	0	0	—		36	0
San Fernando	2022–23	Primera Federación	4	0	0	0	—		4	0
Career total			438	0	17	0	6	0	461	0
