= Marko Dmitrović =

Serbian footballer (born 1992)

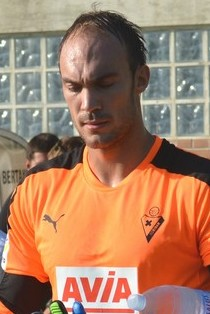
- Dmitrović with Eibar in 2017

Personal information
- Full name: Marko Dmitrović
- Date of birth: 24 January 1992 (age 34)
- Place of birth: Subotica, SR Serbia, SFR Yugoslavia
- Height: 1.94 m (6 ft 4 in)
- Position: Goalkeeper

Team information
- Current team: Espanyol
- Number: 13

Youth career
- 2006–2010: Red Star Belgrade

Senior career*
Years	Team	Apps	(Gls)
2010–2013	Red Star Belgrade	0	(0)
2013–2015	Újpest	12	(0)
2015–2016	Charlton Athletic	5	(0)
2015–2016	→ Alcorcón (loan)	38	(0)
2016–2017	Alcorcón	41	(0)
2017–2021	Eibar	130	(1)
2021–2024	Sevilla	34	(0)
2024–2025	Leganés	32	(0)
2025–	Espanyol	40	(0)

International career
2010–2012	Serbia U19	9	(0)
2012–2015	Serbia U21	15	(0)
2017–2022	Serbia	19	(0)
- * Club domestic league appearances and goals as of 29 August 2026

Marko Dmitrović (Serbian Cyrillic: Марко Дмитровић, pronounced [mâːrko dmîtroʋitɕ]; born 24 January 1992) is a Serbian professional footballer who plays for La Liga club Espanyol as a goalkeeper. He has also previously played for the Serbia national team.

== Club career ==
=== Red Star Belgrade and Újpest ===
Born in Subotica, Dmitrović was a Red Star Belgrade youth graduate, being promoted to the main squad in 2010. On 3 September 2013, after not making appearances for its senior team, he moved to Nemzeti Bajnokság I club Újpest FC in Hungary. Dmitrović made his professional debut on 1 March 2014, starting in a 3–2 away loss against Budapest Honvéd FC. He finished the campaign with 12 appearances, as his side narrowly avoided relegation

=== Charlton Athletic ===
On 6 January 2015, Dmitrović signed an 18-month contract with Charlton Athletic for an undisclosed fee. He made his debut for the club on 24 January, starting in a goalless away draw against Wolverhampton Wanderers.

=== Alcorcón and Eibar ===
On 27 July 2015, Dmitrović moved to Segunda División club AD Alcorcón on a-year loan. The following year on 7 July, after being an undisputed starter, he signed a permanent three-year contract with the club.

On 23 June 2017, Dmitrović signed a four-year contract with SD Eibar in La Liga. He made his debut in the category on 21 August, starting in a 1–0 away victory against Málaga CF. In May 2018, Dmitrović was elected for the best player of SD Eibar for the 2017–18 season. On 21 January 2021, he scored the first goal of his career from the penalty spot in a 2–1 defeat against Atlético Madrid.

=== Later career ===
On 4 July 2021, Dmitrović was announced as a new signing on a free agent contract by Sevilla, with a deal that ran until 2025. On 23 February 2023, he was attacked by a pitch invader whilst playing away at PSV Eindhoven in the Europa League. His attacker was already banned from all stadiums by the Royal Dutch Football Association until 2026, but entered the Philips Stadion on a friend's ticket. The man was jailed for three months, then banned from the stadium for 40 years and from its surroundings for two years.

On 11 August 2024, Dmitrović joined newly-promoted Leganés on a free transfer. In a league match against Getafe on 22 September, he made a save with the tip of his fingers to deny Mauro Arambarri, which would later win the La Liga Save of the Month award for September. On 15 December, he made a crucial stop to keep out Raphinha's shot in a match against Barcelona that earned him the second accolade for December.

On 19 June 2025, Dmitrović joined RCD Espanyol to replace departing Joan García.

== International career ==
In August 2016, Dmitrović was named in Serbia's squad for a 2018 FIFA World Cup qualifier against the Republic of Ireland. He debuted on 14 November 2017 in a friendly match against South Korea.

Dmitrović was selected in Serbia's squads for the 2018, where he was unused backup to Vladimir Stojković, and 2022 FIFA World Cups.

== Career statistics ==
=== Club ===
As of match played 27 October 2026

Appearances and goals by club, season and competition
Club	Season	League			National cup (Note: Includes Magyar Kupa, Copa del Rey)		League cup (Note: Includes Ligakupa)		Europe		Other		Total	
Club	Season	Division	Apps	Goals	Apps	Goals	Apps	Goals	Apps	Goals	Apps	Goals	Apps	Goals
Újpest	2013–14	NB I	12	0	1	0	0	0	—		—		13	0
Újpest	2014–15	NB I	0	0	1	0	4	0	—		—		5	0
Újpest	Total		12	0	2	0	4	0	—		—		18	0
Charlton Athletic	2014–15	Championship	5	0	0	0	0	0	—		—		5	0
Alcorcón	2015–16	Segunda División	38	0	0	0	—		—		—		38	0
Alcorcón	2016–17	Segunda División	41	0	1	0	—		—		—		42	0
Alcorcón	Total		79	0	1	0	—		—		—		80	0
Eibar	2017–18	La Liga	36	0	1	0	—		—		—		37	0
Eibar	2018–19	La Liga	24	0	0	0	—		—		—		24	0
Eibar	2019–20	La Liga	35	0	0	0	—		—		—		24	0
Eibar	2020–21	La Liga	35	1	0	0	—		—		—		35	1
Eibar	Total		130	1	1	0	—		—		—		131	1
Sevilla	2021–22	La Liga	6	0	3	0	—		0	0	—		9	0
Sevilla	2022–23	La Liga	15	0	5	0	—		5 (Note: Two appearances in UEFA Champions League, three appearances in UEFA Europa League)	0	—		25	0
Sevilla	2023–24	La Liga	13	0	2	0	—		4 (Note: Appearances in UEFA Champions League)	0	0	0	19	0
Sevilla	Total		34	0	10	0	—		9	0	0	0	53	0
Leganés	2024–25	La Liga	32	0	0	0	—		—		—		32	0
Espanyol	2025–26	La Liga	37	0	0	0	—		—		—		37	0
Espanyol	2026–27	La Liga	7	0	1	0	—		—		—		8	0
Espanyol	Total		44	0	1	0	—		—		—		45	0
Career total			336	1	15	0	4	0	9	0	0	0	364	1

=== International ===
As of match played 9 June 2022

Appearances and goals by national team and year
National team	Year	Apps	Goals
Serbia	2017	1	0
Serbia	2018	4	0
Serbia	2019	8	0
Serbia	2020	3	0
Serbia	2021	2	0
Serbia	2022	1	0
Total		19	0

== Honours ==
Újpest

- Magyar Kupa: 2013–14

Sevilla

- UEFA Europa League: 2022–23

Individual

- La Liga Save of the Month: September 2024, December 2024, March 2026
