= Javi López (footballer, born 1988) =

Spanish footballer

Personal information
- Full name: Francisco Javier López Díaz
- Date of birth: 20 April 1988 (age 38)
- Place of birth: Málaga, Spain
- Height: 1.78 m (5 ft 10 in)
- Position: Winger

Youth career
- 2006–2007: Málaga

Senior career*
Years	Team	Apps	(Gls)
2007–2009	Málaga B	84	(20)
2009–2012	Málaga	11	(2)
2010–2011	→ Ponferradina (loan)	16	(2)
2011–2012	→ Jaén (loan)	24	(2)
2012−2013	Getafe B	27	(5)
2013−2015	Guadalajara	67	(14)
2015−2016	Murcia	25	(0)
2016−2017	Lorca	9	(0)
2017−2018	Lleida Esportiu	44	(6)
2018−2020	Pontevedra	15	(3)
2020−2024	Juventud Torremolinos	105	(15)
Total		427	(69)
- * Club domestic league appearances and goals

Francisco Javier 'Javi' López Díaz (born 20 April 1988) is a Spanish former professional footballer who played as a right winger.

== Club career ==
López was born in Málaga, Andalusia. As a product of hometown Málaga CF's youth ranks, he made his first-team – and La Liga – debut on 7 November 2009, scoring in a 2–2 away draw against CD Tenerife; another player promoted from the reserves, Daniel Toribio, also made his first appearance in that game.

Firmly established in the side's starting XI, López netted his second goal on 31 January 2010 in a 2–0 victory at Atlético Madrid. For the 2010–11 season, however, he was loaned to SD Ponferradina, recently returned to the Segunda División, alongside teammate Toribio. He scored his first goal on 11 September, but this happened in a 1–5 home loss to Villarreal CF B.

López was again loaned the following summer, this time to Real Jaén of Segunda División B. He made his official debut on 18 September 2011 in the 2−0 home defeat of CD Puertollano, and scored his first goal on 12 February of the following year in a 1−1 draw against the same opponents.

On 6 June 2012, López was told that his contract would not be renewed by Málaga, and he would be free to start looking for a new club. The following month, he signed with Getafe CF's reserves in division three; he continued competing in that tier the following years, representing a host of teams.
