= David Rodríguez (footballer, born 1986) =

Spanish footballer

Personal information
- Full name: David Rodríguez Sánchez
- Date of birth: 14 February 1986 (age 40)
- Place of birth: Talavera de la Reina, Spain
- Height: 1.78 m (5 ft 10 in)
- Position: Forward

Youth career
- Atlético Madrid

Senior career*
Years	Team	Apps	(Gls)
2004–2007	Atlético Madrid B	64	(20)
2005	→ Ciudad Murcia (loan)	2	(0)
2006	→ Las Palmas (loan)	18	(2)
2007–2008	Salamanca	38	(14)
2008–2010	Almería	9	(1)
2008–2009	→ Celta (loan)	36	(8)
2010–2014	Celta	70	(26)
2012–2013	→ Sporting Gijón (loan)	37	(12)
2014	Brighton & Hove Albion	10	(1)
2014–2017	Alcorcón	123	(51)
2017–2019	Osasuna	48	(7)
2019	→ Numancia (loan)	16	(4)
2019–2020	Racing Santander	27	(2)
2020–2022	Racing Ferrol	56	(16)
2022–2023	Rayo Majadahonda	37	(13)
2023–2024	Atlético Baleares	31	(7)
Total		622	(184)

International career
2001–2002	Spain U16	6	(11)
2002–2003	Spain U17	21	(13)
2003	Spain U18	3	(2)
2004–2005	Spain U19	6	(2)
Medal record
Representing Spain
Men's football
FIFA U-17 World Cup
Runner-up	2003 Finland
UEFA European Under-17 Championship
Runner-up	2003 Portugal
- * Club domestic league appearances and goals

David Rodríguez Sánchez (born 14 February 1986) is a Spanish former professional footballer who played as a forward.

He amassed Segunda División totals of 392 games and 124 goals over 12 seasons, representing Ciudad de Murcia, Salamanca, Celta, Sporting de Gijón, Alcorcón, Osasuna, Numancia and Racing de Santander in the competition. He added 14 matches in La Liga (one goal), and also played professionally in England with Brighton & Hove Albion.

== Club career ==
Rodríguez was born in Talavera de la Reina, Province of Toledo. After leaving Atlético Madrid's youth academy, he started professionally with Ciudad de Murcia in the Segunda División. However, the lack of playing time for the Colchoneros' first team made him drop down to Segunda División B in January 2006, as he moved to UD Las Palmas.

In the 2006–07 season, Rodríguez returned to Atlético to play with the reserves and rank as their top scorer, a feat which he repeated the following campaign with UD Salamanca in the second division. Such solid performances earned him a transfer to La Liga, moving for €400.000 to UD Almería; before 2008–09 began, however, he was loaned to RC Celta de Vigo, returning the following summer to Andalusia.

Rodríguez made his top-flight debut on 30 August 2009, appearing in a 0–0 home draw against Real Valladolid. On 22 November, he scored after just five minutes on the pitch but Almería lost 3–1 at RCD Mallorca, and the player was only the fourth of fifth attacking option at the club during the season.

On 17 July 2010, after having been suspended by Almería, Rodríguez signed for Celta permanently, penning a four-year contract. In the first year of his second spell he netted 17 goals, leading the Galicians to the sixth position in the regular season and the subsequent promotion playoffs.

On 29 August 2012, having contributed nine goals in 28 matches to Celta's promotion, Rodríguez signed for second tier side Sporting de Gijón. He scored his first goal for his new team on 9 September, opening in a 1–1 home draw against CD Lugo.

Rodríguez terminated his contract at Celta on 30 January 2014, completing a move to English club Brighton & Hove Albion the following day. He made his debut in the Championship two days later, coming on as a second-half substitute in a 2–0 loss at Watford.

On 18 July 2014, free agent Rodríguez joined AD Alcorcón. He scored a career-best 20 goals in his debut season, helping to a final 11th position in division two.

Rodríguez scored his first hat-trick as a professional on 24 October 2015, in a 6–1 home demolition of UE Llagostera. On 30 June 2017, after 52 overall goals for the Alfareros, he signed a three-year contract with CA Osasuna in the same league, for €350,000.

On 30 January 2019, Rodríguez was loaned to CD Numancia also of the second division until June. Upon returning to the El Sadar Stadium, he terminated his contract on 1 July, and agreed to a one-year deal at Racing de Santander on 20 August.

Rodríguez competed in the lower leagues until his retirement, representing Racing de Ferrol, CF Rayo Majadahonda and CD Atlético Baleares.

== International career ==
Rodríguez was crowned top scorer of the 2003 UEFA European Under-17 Championship at six goals, as Spain finished second to hosts Portugal. In the final, he scored on either side of Márcio Sousa's brace.

== Personal life ==
Rodríguez's younger brother, Sergio, was also a footballer. A defender, he played as a senior for Atlético Madrid and Celta, in both cases only representing their reserves.

== Career statistics ==
As of match played 9 May 2021

Appearances and goals by club, season and competition
Club	Season	League			National Cup		Other		Total	
Club	Season	Division	Apps	Goals	Apps	Goals	Apps	Goals	Apps	Goals
Atlético Madrid B	2003–04	Segunda División B	6	2	—		4 (Note: Appearances in Segunda División B play-offs)	0	10	2
Atlético Madrid B	2004–05	Segunda División B	24	5	—		—		24	5
Atlético Madrid B	2006–07	Segunda División B	34	13	—		—		34	13
Atlético Madrid B	Total		64	20	0	0	4	0	68	20
Ciudad Murcia (loan)	2005–06	Segunda División	2	0	2	0	—		4	0
Las Palmas (loan)	2005–06	Segunda Divisíon B	18	2	0	0	4	0	22	2
Salamanca	2007–08	Segunda División	38	14	1	0	—		39	14
Almería	2009–10	La Liga	9	1	2	0	—		11	1
Celta (loan)	2008–09	Segunda División	36	8	4	1	—		40	9
Celta	2010–11	Segunda División	37	17	0	0	1 (Note: Appearance in La Liga play-offs)	0	38	17
Celta	2011–12	Segunda División	28	9	3	2	—		31	11
Celta	2013–14	La Liga	5	0	0	0	—		5	0
Celta	Total		106	34	7	3	1	0	114	37
Sporting Gijón (loan)	2012–13	Segunda División	37	12	1	0	—		38	12
Brighton & Hove Albion	2013–14	Championship	10	1	2	0	—		12	1
Alcorcón	2014–15	Segunda División	42	20	0	0	—		42	20
Alcorcón	2015–16	Segunda División	42	19	0	0	—		42	19
Alcorcón	2016–17	Segunda División	39	12	5	1	—		44	13
Alcorcón	Total		123	51	5	1	0	0	128	52
Osasuna	2017–18	Segunda División	36	7	2	0	—		38	7
Osasuna	2018–19	Segunda División	12	0	1	0	—		13	0
Osasuna	Total		48	7	3	0	0	0	51	7
Numancia (loan)	2018–19	Segunda División	16	4	0	0	—		16	4
Racing Santander	2019–20	Segunda División	27	2	1	0	—		28	2
Racing Ferrol	2020–21	Segunda División B	20	7	0	0	—		20	7
Career total			518	155	24	4	9	0	551	159

== Honours ==
Osasuna

- Segunda División: 2018–19
