= Moi Delgado =

Spanish footballer

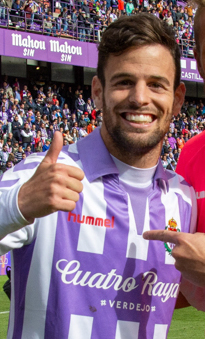
- Delgado with Valladolid in 2019

Personal information
- Full name: Moisés Delgado López
- Date of birth: 18 April 1994 (age 32)
- Place of birth: Utrera, Spain
- Height: 1.73 m (5 ft 8 in)
- Position: Left-back

Youth career
- 2003–2013: Sevilla

Senior career*
Years	Team	Apps	(Gls)
2013–2015	Sevilla B	85	(2)
2014	Sevilla	2	(0)
2016–2018	Barcelona B	37	(0)
2018	Valladolid B	14	(0)
2018–2021	Valladolid	3	(0)
2019–2020	→ Racing Santander (loan)	26	(1)
2020–2021	→ Fuenlabrada (loan)	13	(0)
2021	→ Ponferradina (loan)	16	(1)
2022	UCAM Murcia	13	(1)
2022–2023	Ponferradina	34	(0)
2023–2025	Racing Ferrol	49	(0)
2025	Huesca	7	(0)
2025–2026	Gimnàstic	24	(0)
- * Club domestic league appearances and goals as of 10 June 2026

Moisés "Moi" Delgado López (born 18 April 1994) is a Spanish professional footballer who plays as a left-back.

== Club career ==
Born in Utrera, Province of Seville, Andalusia, Delgado played youth football with local club Sevilla FC. He made his senior debut with the reserves in the Segunda División B, his first appearance in the competition being on 24 February 2013 in a 3–2 home win against Cádiz CF.

In summer 2013, Delgado was one of several youth players called by manager Unai Emery for preseason with the first team. On 11 May 2014, as the coach was resting several starters for the final of the UEFA Europa League, he made his La Liga debut, featuring the full 90 minutes in a 1–0 loss at Getafe CF.

Delgado signed for FC Barcelona on 28 December 2015, and was immediately assigned to the reserves also in the third division. After achieving promotion in 2017, he failed to appear the following season and termated his contract on 19 January 2018.

On 30 January 2018, Delgado joined another reserve team, Real Valladolid Promesas still in division three. On 14 May, he agreed to an extension until 2020 and was promoted to the main squad ahead of the upcoming campaign.

Delgado played his first Spanish top-tier match with Valladolid on 20 January 2019, starting the 1–0 away defeat to Levante UD. On 4 July, he extended his contract until 2022, and was loaned to second-tier Racing de Santander seven days later.

Delgado scored his first professional goal on 19 January 2020, opening a 1–1 home draw against UD Las Palmas for Racing. On 1 September, after suffering relegation, he moved to CF Fuenlabrada in the same league and also in a temporary deal. This spell was cut short on 2 February 2021, and he joined SD Ponferradina also on loan hours later.

On 28 August 2021, Delgado terminated his contract with Valladolid, and remained unemployed for six months before signing for Primera División RFEF side UCAM Murcia CF on 31 January 2022. On 31 July, he returned to Ponferradina and the second division.

On 27 July 2023, following his side's relegation, Delgado remained in the second tier with Racing de Ferrol. He terminated his link with the club on 14 January, despite being regularly used, and moved to SD Huesca late in the month.

On 25 August 2025, Delgado agreed to a one-year deal with Gimnàstic de Tarragona in Primera Federación. In June of the following year, his contract was automatically extended for a further season, but was subsequently terminated.
