= Jorge Rastrojo =

Spanish footballer

Personal information
- Full name: Jorge Rastrojo Moro
- Date of birth: 1 April 2000 (age 26)
- Place of birth: Badajoz, Spain
- Height: 1.79 m (5 ft 10 in)
- Position: Winger

Team information
- Current team: Eldense
- Number: 7

Youth career
- Don Bosco
- Diocesano

Senior career*
Years	Team	Apps	(Gls)
2019–2021	Diocesano	40	(11)
2021–2023	Zaragoza B	62	(9)
2023–2025	Unionistas	56	(5)
2025–2026	Algeciras	35	(5)
2026–	Eldense	1	(0)
- * Club domestic league appearances and goals as of 17 August 2026

Jorge Rastrojo Moro (born 1 April 2001) is a Spanish professional footballer who plays mainly as a left winger for CD Eldense.

== Career ==
Born in Badajoz, Extremadura, Rastrojo represented CP Don Bosco and CD Diocesano as a youth, before making his senior debut with the latter club in 2019, in Tercera División. In July 2021, he signed for Real Zaragoza and was initially assigned to the reserves in Tercera División RFEF.

On 25 July 2023, Rastrojo was announced at Primera Federación side Unionistas de Salamanca CF. After two seasons featuring regularly, he moved to fellow league team Algeciras CF on 19 June 2025.

On 2 July 2026, Rastrojo agreed to a two-year contract with CD Eldense, newly-promoted to Segunda División. He made his professional debut at the age of 26 on 17 August, coming on as a second-half substitute for Marcos Bustillo in a 3–0 away loss to UD Almería.
