= List of Spanish football transfers winter 2016–17 =

This is a list of Spanish football transfers for the winter sale in the 2016–17 season of La Liga and Segunda División. Only moves from La Liga and Segunda División are listed.

The winter transfer window opened on 1 January 2017, although a few transfers took place prior to that date. The window closed at midnight on 31 January 2017. Players without a club can join one at any time, either during or in between transfer windows. Clubs below La Liga level can also sign players on loan at any time. If need be, clubs can sign a goalkeeper on an emergency loan, if all others are unavailable.

== Winter 2016-17 transfer window ==
Date	Name	Moving from	Moving to	Fee
30 November 2016	(Spain) Iago Herrerín	(Spain) Athletic Bilbao	(Spain) Leganés	Loan
7 December 2016	(Argentina) Sebastián Dubarbier	(Spain) Almería	(Argentina) Estudiantes	Free
22 December 2016	(Spain) Manu Barreiro	(Spain) Alavés	(Spain) Gimnàstic	Free
23 December 2016	(Spain) Fabián Ruiz	(Spain) Real Betis	(Spain) Elche	Loan
23 December 2016	(Spain) Manolín	(Spain) Alcorcón	(Spain) UCAM Murcia	Free
27 December 2016	(Spain) Fernando Usero	(Greece) Atromitos	(Spain) Mirandés	Free
27 December 2016	(Spain) Pablo Maffeo	(England) Manchester City	(Spain) Girona	Loan
27 December 2016	(Spain) Angeliño	(England) Manchester City	(Spain) Girona	Loan
29 December 2016	(Greece) Dimitris Siovas	(Greece) Olympiacos	(Spain) Leganés	Loan
29 December 2016	(Spain) Lluís Sastre	(Spain) Leganés	(Spain) Huesca	Free
29 December 2016	(Croatia) Ivan Kelava	(Spain) Granada	Unattached	Free
29 December 2016	(Democratic Republic of the Congo) Cedrick Mabwati	(United States) Columbus Crew	(Spain) UCAM Murcia	Free
30 December 2016	(Spain) Jota	(Spain) Eibar	(England) Brentford	Loan return
30 December 2016	(Spain) Javi Noblejas	(Spain) Elche	Unattached	Free
31 December 2016	(Brazil) Vinícius Araújo	(Brazil) Sport Recife	(Spain) Valencia	Loan return
1 January 2017	(Belgium) Charly Musonda	(Spain) Real Betis	(England) Chelsea	Loan return
2 January 2017	(Netherlands) Ryan Babel	(Spain) Deportivo La Coruña	(Turkey) Beşiktaş	Free
2 January 2017	(Argentina) Nereo Champagne	(Argentina) Olimpo	(Spain) Leganés	Loan
2 January 2017	(Slovenia) Bojan Jokić	(Spain) Villarreal	Unattached	Free
2 January 2017	(Spain) Saúl García	(Spain) Deportivo La Coruña	(Spain) Mallorca	Loan
3 January 2017	(Spain) Piti	(Spain) Rayo Vallecano	(Cyprus) AEL Limassol	Free
3 January 2017	(Morocco) Moha Rharsalla	(Spain) Gimnàstic	(Ukraine) Olimpik Donetsk	Loan return
3 January 2017	(Spain) Jesús Valentín	(Spain) Huesca	(Spain) Zaragoza	Free
4 January 2017	(France) Timothée Kolodziejczak	(Spain) Sevilla	(Germany) Borussia Mönchengladbach	Undisclosed
4 January 2017	(Spain) Iván González	(Spain) Alcorcón	(Poland) Wisła Kraków	Free
4 January 2017	(Venezuela) Adalberto Peñaranda	(England) Watford	(Spain) Málaga	Loan
4 January 2017	(Georgia (country)) Otar Kakabadze	(Spain) Gimnàstic	(Denmark) Esbjerg	Loan
4 January 2017	(Spain) Asdrúbal Padrón	(Spain) Las Palmas	(Thailand) Port	Free
5 January 2017	(France) Clément Lenglet	(France) Nancy	(Spain) Sevilla	€5M
5 January 2017	(Algeria) Foued Kadir	(Spain) Getafe	(Spain) Alcorcón	Free
5 January 2017	(Spain) Tomás Mejías	(England) Middlesbrough	(Spain) Rayo Vallecano	Loan
6 January 2017	(Italy) Alberto Brignoli	(Spain) Leganés	(Italy) Juventus	Loan return
7 January 2017	(Croatia) Elvir Maloku	(Spain) Gimnàstic	(Cyprus) AEK Larnaca	Loan
7 January 2017	(Brazil) Bruno Perone	Unattached	(Spain) Gimnàstic	Free
9 January 2017	(Algeria) Carl Medjani	(Spain) Leganés	(Turkey) Trabzonspor	Free
10 January 2017	(Spain) Jon Toral	(Spain) Granada	(England) Arsenal	Loan return
10 January 2017	(Argentina) Martín Demichelis	(Spain) Espanyol	(Spain) Málaga	Free
10 January 2017	(Montenegro) Stevan Jovetić	(Italy) Internazionale	(Spain) Sevilla	Loan
10 January 2017	(Spain) José Naranjo	(Spain) Celta Vigo	(Belgium) Genk	€1.8M
10 January 2017	(Norway) Martin Ødegaard	(Spain) Real Madrid	(Netherlands) Heerenveen	Loan
10 January 2017	(Spain) Javi Lara	(India) Atlético Kolkata	(Spain) Córdoba	Free
11 January 2017	(Spain) Lolo	(Spain) Elche	(Spain) Hércules	Free
11 January 2017	(Spain) Luis Fernández	(Spain) Alcorcón	(Spain) UCAM Murcia	Free
11 January 2017	(Spain) Alex Quintanilla	(Spain) Almería	(Spain) Mirandés	Free
13 January 2017	(Serbia) Saša Zdjelar	(Greece) Olympiacos	(Spain) Mallorca	Loan
13 January 2017	(Spain) Jozabed	(England) Fulham	(Spain) Celta Vigo	Loan
13 January 2017	(Netherlands) Ola John	(Portugal) Benfica	(Spain) Deportivo La Coruña	Loan
14 January 2017	(Spain) David Costas	(Spain) Celta Vigo	(Spain) Real Oviedo	Loan
15 January 2017	(Italy) Simone Zaza	(Italy) Juventus	(Spain) Valencia	Loan
16 January 2017	(Spain) David Barral	(Spain) Granada	(Cyprus) APOEL	Free
17 January 2017	(Paraguay) Óscar Romero	(China) Shanghai Shenhua	(Spain) Deportivo Alavés	Loan
17 January 2017	(Spain) Borja Fernández	(India) Atlético Kolkata	(Spain) Almería	Free
17 January 2017	(Cameroon) Lucien Owona	(Spain) Villanovense	(Spain) Alcorcón	Free
17 January 2017	(Spain) Javi Álamo	(Spain) Osasuna	(Spain) Almería	Free
17 January 2017	(France) Gaël Kakuta	Hebei China Fortune	(Spain) Deportivo La Coruña	Loan
18 January 2017	(Spain) Iván Sánchez	(Spain) Almería	(Spain) Albacete	Loan
19 January 2017	(Iceland) Sverrir Ingi Ingason	(Belgium) Lokeren	(Spain) Granada	Undisclosed
19 January 2017	(Spain) Samu García	(Russia) Rubin Kazan	(Spain) Leganés	Loan
19 January 2017	(Spain) Juanjo	(Spain) Cádiz	(Spain) Murcia	Free
19 January 2017	(Greece) Panagiotis Kone	(Italy) Udinese	(Spain) Granada	Loan
21 January 2017	(Spain) Adrián López	(Portugal) Porto	(Spain) Villarreal	Loan
24 January 2017	(Romania) Alin Toșca	(Romania) Steaua București	(Spain) Real Betis	€1M
24 January 2017	(Spain) Juan Muñoz	(Spain) Sevilla	(Spain) Levante	Loan
24 January 2017	(Portugal) Luís Martins	(Spain) Granada	(Portugal) Marítimo	Loan
24 January 2017	(Argentina) Mariano Bíttolo	(Greece) Atromitos	(Spain) Córdoba	Free
24 January 2017	(Spain) Rubén Pardo	(Spain) Real Sociedad	(Spain) Real Betis	Loan
24 January 2017	(Belgium) Davy Roef	(Belgium) Anderlecht	(Spain) Deportivo La Coruña	Loan
24 January 2017	(Spain) Rubén Martínez	(Spain) Deportivo La Coruña	(Belgium) Anderlecht	Loan
24 January 2017	(Ukraine) Vasyl Kravets	(Ukraine) Karpaty Lviv	(Spain) Lugo	Loan
24 January 2017	(Spain) Luis Hernández	(England) Leicester City	(Spain) Málaga	€2M
25 January 2017	(Montenegro) Nikola Vujadinović	(China) Beijing BG	(Spain) Osasuna	Free
26 January 2017	(Croatia) Alen Halilović	(Germany) Hamburger SV	(Spain) Las Palmas	Loan
26 January 2017	(Colombia) Adrián Ramos	(China) Chongqing Lifan	(Spain) Granada	Loan
26 January 2017	(Spain) Mikel Vesga	(Spain) Athletic Bilbao	(Spain) Sporting Gijón	Loan
27 January 2017	(Spain) Jesús Imaz	(Spain) UCAM Murcia	(Spain) Cádiz	Free
27 January 2017	(Spain) Iago Díaz	(Spain) Almería	(Spain) Cultural Leonesa	Loan
27 January 2017	(Spain) Abel	(Spain) Cádiz	(Spain) Lorca	Free
30 January 2017	(Brazil) Alexandre Pato	(Spain) Villarreal	(China) Tianjin Quanjian	€18M
30 January 2017	(Republic of the Congo) Dominique Malonga	(Italy) Pro Vercelli	(Spain) Elche	Free
30 January 2017	(Spain) Iván Malón	(Greece) Veria	(Spain) Cádiz	Free
30 January 2017	(Australia) Mathew Ryan	(Spain) Valencia	(Belgium) Genk	Loan
30 January 2017	(Montenegro) Marko Bakić	(Portugal) Braga	(Spain) Alcorcón	Loan
30 January 2017	(Spain) Héctor Hernández	(Spain) Real Sociedad	(Spain) Granada	Loan
30 January 2017	(Cameroon) Raoul Loé	(Qatar) Al-Sailiya	(Spain) Osasuna	Free
30 January 2017	(Spain) Oier Olazábal	(Spain) Granada	(Spain) Levante	Loan
30 January 2017	(Brazil) Rodrigo Ely	(Italy) Milan	(Spain) Alavés	Loan
30 January 2017	(Spain) Kike Sola	(Spain) Athletic Bilbao	(Spain) Numancia	Loan
31 January 2017	(Spain) Sergio Mantecón	(Spain) Cádiz	Unattached	Free
31 January 2017	(Spain) Alberto Bueno	(Portugal) Porto	(Spain) Leganés	Loan
31 January 2017	(France) Karim Yoda	(Spain) Getafe	(Spain) Almería	Loan
31 January 2017	(Spain) Sergio Aguza	(Spain) Alcorcón	(Spain) Córdoba	Free
31 January 2017	(Senegal) Alfred N'Diaye	(Spain) Villarreal	(England) Hull City	Loan
31 January 2017	(Chile) Fabián Orellana	(Spain) Celta Vigo	(Spain) Valencia	€2M
31 January 2017	(Portugal) Henrique Sereno	(India) Atlético Kolkata	(Spain) Almería	Free
31 January 2017	(Cameroon) Lionel Enguene	(Spain) Lugo	(Portugal) Leixões	Loan
31 January 2017	(Spain) Ager Aketxe	(Spain) Athletic Bilbao	(Spain) Cádiz	Loan
31 January 2017	(Ivory Coast) Lacina Traoré	(France) Monaco	(Spain) Sporting Gijón	Loan
31 January 2017	(Spain) Alfonso Pedraza	(Spain) Villarreal	(England) Leeds United	Loan
31 January 2017	(Denmark) Andrew Hjulsager	(Denmark) Brøndby IF	(Spain) Celta Vigo	Undisclosed
31 January 2017	(Italy) Marco Motta	(England) Charlton Athletic	(Spain) Almería	Free
31 January 2017	(Spain) José Rodríguez	(Germany) Mainz 05	(Spain) Málaga	Loan
31 January 2017	(Morocco) Nabil El Zhar	(Spain) Las Palmas	(Spain) Leganés	Free
31 January 2017	(Italy) Salvatore Sirigu	(France) Paris Saint-Germain	(Spain) Osasuna	Loan
31 January 2017	(Argentina) Cristian Espinoza	(Spain) Villarreal	(Spain) Valladolid	Loan
31 January 2017	(Brazil) Lucas Silva	(Spain) Real Madrid	(Brazil) Cruzeiro	Loan
31 January 2017	(Spain) Carlos Calvo	(Spain) Cádiz	(Spain) Badalona	Loan
31 January 2017	(Nigeria) Elderson Echiéjilé	(France) Monaco	(Spain) Sporting Gijón	Loan
31 January 2017	(Spain) Tito	(Spain) Granada	(Spain) Leganés	Loan
31 January 2017	(Venezuela) Andrés Túñez	(Thailand) Buriram United	(Spain) Elche	Loan
31 January 2017	(Spain) Borja Domínguez	(Spain) Córdoba	(Spain) Oviedo	Loan
31 January 2017	(Argentina) Federico Cartabia	(Spain) Valencia	(Spain) Deportivo La Coruña	Undisclosed
31 January 2017	(Argentina) Federico Cartabia	(Spain) Deportivo La Coruña	(Portugal) Braga	Loan
31 January 2017	(Ghana) Mubarak Wakaso	(Greece) Panathinaikos	(Spain) Granada	Loan
31 January 2017	(Algeria) Rachid Aït-Atmane	(Spain) Sporting Gijón	(Spain) Tenerife	Loan
31 January 2017	(Spain) Jesé	(France) Paris Saint-Germain	(Spain) Las Palmas	Loan
1 February 2017	(Japan) Hiroshi Kiyotake	(Spain) Sevilla	(Japan) Cerezo Osaka	€6M
1 February 2017	(Serbia) Aleksandar Pantić	(Spain) Villarreal	(Ukraine) Dynamo Kyiv	Free
14 February 2017	(Spain) Álvaro Rey	(Spain) Alcorcón	(Greece) Panetolikos	Free
