= Nana Boateng =

Nana Boateng may refer to:

- Nana Boateng (footballer, born 1994), Ghanaian midfielder
- Nana Boateng (footballer, born 2002), English forward
