= Marco Camus =

Spanish footballer (born 2001)

Personal information
- Full name: Marco Camús Muñoz
- Date of birth: 16 November 2001 (age 24)
- Place of birth: Santander, Spain
- Height: 1.83 m (6 ft 0 in)
- Position: Winger

Team information
- Current team: Krasava
- Number: 80

Youth career
- Racing Santander

Senior career*
Years	Team	Apps	(Gls)
2020	Racing B	7	(1)
2020–2023	Racing Santander	70	(2)
2023	→ Córdoba (loan)	10	(1)
2023–2025	Valencia B	41	(7)
2025–2026	Ourense	14	(0)
2026–	Krasava	12	(1)
- * Club domestic league appearances and goals as of 3 May 2026

Marco Camus Muñoz (born 16 November 2001) is a Spanish professional footballer who plays as a right winger for Cypriot First Division club Krasava.

== Club career ==
Born in Santander, Cantabria, Camus was a Racing de Santander youth graduate and signed his first professional contract with the club in July 2019. The following 26 January, he made his senior debut with the reserves, playing the last 30 minutes in a 1–0 Tercera División home win against SD Solares-Medio Cudeyo.

Camus scored his first senior goal on 1 March 2020, netting the opener in a 2–0 away defeat of Vimenor CF. He made his first-team debut on 1 July, coming on as a late substitute for Borja Galán in a 0–1 loss at Extremadura UD in the Segunda División.

On 21 September 2020, Camus was definitely promoted to the main squad, now in the Segunda División B. On 30 January 2023, he joined Córdoba CF on loan until the end of the season.

On 23 August 2023, Camus moved to Valencia CF and was assigned to the B-team in Segunda Federación.
