= Jon Ander (footballer, born 1990) =

Spanish footballer

Personal information
- Full name: Jon Ander Pérez Ruiz de Garibay
- Date of birth: 16 January 1990 (age 36)
- Place of birth: Vitoria-Gasteiz, Spain
- Height: 1.84 m (6 ft 0 in)
- Position: Forward

Team information
- Current team: Real Unión

Youth career
- Alavés
- Urgatzi
- 2008–2009: Aurrerá Vitoria

Senior career*
Years	Team	Apps	(Gls)
2009–2013	Aurrerá Vitoria	57	(33)
2013–2014	Vitoria	40	(18)
2014–2016	Aurrerá Vitoria	62	(26)
2016–2017	Beasain	30	(17)
2017–2018	Amorebieta	37	(15)
2018–2021	Racing Santander	62	(16)
2021–2022	Logroñés	34	(8)
2022–	Real Unión	0	(0)
- * Club domestic league appearances and goals as of 29 May 2022

Jon Ander Pérez Ruiz de Garibay (born 16 January 1990), known as Jon Ander, is a Spanish professional footballer who plays as a forward for Real Unión.

== Club career ==
Born in Vitoria-Gasteiz, Álava, Basque Country, Jon Ander finished his formation with CD Aurrerá de Vitoria, and made his senior debut in the 2009–10 season, in the regional leagues. In 2013, he moved to fellow fifth division CD Vitoria before returning to Aurrerá the following year.

On 30 June 2017, after a one-season spell at SD Beasain, Jon Ander signed for Segunda División B side SD Amorebieta. Roughly one year later, he moved to fellow league team Racing de Santander on a three-year deal.

Jon Ander contributed with ten goals in 28 appearances, as his side achieved promotion to Segunda División, but spent the latter months of the competition nursing a knee injury. He returned to action in late October 2019, and made his professional debut on 2 November of that year by coming on as a late substitute for Álvaro Cejudo in a 0–1 away loss against AD Alcorcón.
