= Iñaki Olaortua =

Spanish footballer

Personal information
- Full name: Iñaki Olaortua Descarga
- Date of birth: 3 August 1993 (age 33)
- Place of birth: Elgeta, Spain
- Height: 1.84 m (6 ft 1/2 in)
- Position: Centre back

Team information
- Current team: Conquense
- Number: 5

Youth career
- Eibar

Senior career*
Years	Team	Apps	(Gls)
2011–2014	Eibar B	28	(0)
2012–2013	→ Anaitasuna (loan)	30	(0)
2013–2014	→ Zamudio (loan)	29	(2)
2014–2015	Portugalete	33	(1)
2015–2016	Zaragoza B	27	(3)
2015–2016	Zaragoza	1	(0)
2016–2017	Amorebieta	31	(2)
2017–2018	Barakaldo	32	(0)
2018–2020	Racing Santander	50	(0)
2020–2023	Atlético Baleares	90	(4)
2023–2024	Ibiza	14	(1)
2024–2025	Real Unión	28	(1)
2025–	Conquense	26	(1)
- * Club domestic league appearances and goals as of 7 May 2026

Iñaki Olaortua Descarga (born 3 August 1993) is a Spanish footballer who plays as a centre back for Segunda Federación club Conquense.

== Club career ==
Born in Elgeta, Gipuzkoa, Basque Country, Olaortua graduated with SD Eibar's youth setup, and made his debuts with the reserves in Tercera División. He subsequently served loan deals at fellow fourth division sides CD Anaitasuna and Zamudio SD before being released in 2014.

On 15 June 2014 Olaortua joined Club Portugalete, also in the fourth tier. After achieving promotion to Segunda División B he moved to Real Zaragoza, being assigned to the B-team in the fourth level.

On 15 October 2015 Olaortua made his professional debut, starting and scoring an own goal in a 1–2 Copa del Rey home loss against UE Llagostera. In July of the following year, he moved to third level club SD Amorebieta.

On 17 July 2017, Olaortua joined Barakaldo CF still in the third division. The following 16 June, he signed for fellow league team Racing de Santander, and achieved promotion to the second level in his first season.

On 1 October 2020, Olaortua was presented at third division side CD Atlético Baleares along with his wife Maialen Esnaola, who joined to club to play for their women's team.

On 8 July 2024, after being released by Ibiza, Olaortua signed for Real Unión on a free transfer.
