= Martín Solar =

Spanish footballer

Personal information
- Full name: Martín Solar Ruiz
- Date of birth: 30 January 2000 (age 26)
- Place of birth: Santander, Spain
- Height: 1.75 m (5 ft 9 in)
- Position: Midfielder

Team information
- Current team: Mérida
- Number: 8

Youth career
- Racing Santander

Senior career*
Years	Team	Apps	(Gls)
2019–2020	Racing B	26	(6)
2020–2021	Racing Santander	16	(2)
2021–2023	Granada B	66	(8)
2022	Granada	0	(0)
2023–2024	Cultural Leonesa	35	(6)
2024–2025	Arenteiro	36	(2)
2025–	Mérida	37	(0)
- * Club domestic league appearances and goals as of 9 June 2026

Martín Solar Ruiz (born 30 January 2000) is a Spanish professional footballer who plays as a central midfielder for Primera Federación club Mérida.

== Club career ==
Born in Santander, Cantabria, Solar was a Racing de Santander youth graduate. He made his senior debut with the reserves on 25 August 2019, starting in a 1–3 Tercera División away loss against AD Siete Villas.

Solar scored his first senior goal on 26 October 2019, netting the fourth in a 4–0 away routing of UM Escobedo. The following 8 March, he scored a brace in a 7–0 home thrashing of Selaya FC.

Solar made his first team debut on 7 July 2020, coming on as a half-time substitute for Mario Ortiz in a 0–1 loss at CF Fuenlabrada in the Segunda División. On 21 September, he was definitely promoted to the main squad, now in the Segunda División B.

On 3 August 2021, Solar signed a two-year contract with Granada CF, being assigned to the B-team of the Segunda División RFEF. On 7 July 2023, he moved to Primera Federación side Cultural y Deportiva Leonesa.
