= Daniel Toribio =

Spanish footballer

Personal information
- Full name: Daniel Toribio Gutiérrez
- Date of birth: 5 October 1988 (age 38)
- Place of birth: Girona, Spain
- Height: 1.73 m (5 ft 8 in)
- Position: Midfielder

Youth career
- Salt
- Vilobí
- 2002–2007: Barcelona

Senior career*
Years	Team	Apps	(Gls)
2007–2009	Barcelona B	19	(2)
2008–2009	→ Terrassa (loan)	36	(0)
2009–2010	Málaga B	15	(0)
2009–2011	Málaga	21	(0)
2010–2011	→ Ponferradina (loan)	38	(1)
2011–2012	Villarreal B	33	(0)
2012–2013	Villarreal	5	(0)
2013–2014	Murcia	48	(0)
2014–2015	Alavés	35	(1)
2015–2020	Alcorcón	120	(4)
2019–2020	→ Racing Santander (loan)	22	(0)
2020–2022	Extremadura	35	(0)
2022	Lleida Esportiu	13	(0)
2022–2025	Santa Coloma	69	(2)
Total		509	(10)
- * Club domestic league appearances and goals

Daniel Toribio Gutiérrez (born 5 October 1988) is a Spanish former professional footballer who played as a midfielder.

== Club career ==
Born in Girona, Catalonia, Toribio was a product of FC Barcelona's youth academy. He joined Atlético Malagueño in 2009, from where he was promoted to Málaga CF's first team midway through the season, his La Liga debut coming on 7 November 2009 in a 2–2 away draw against CD Tenerife; another player from the reserves, Javi López, also made his first appearance in that game.

On 17 August 2010, Toribio and Javi López joined SD Ponferradina of Segunda División on loan for the campaign. On 6 July 2011, he terminated his two-year contract with Málaga and signed for another team in that level, Villarreal CF B.

Toribio continued to compete in the second tier the following years, representing Real Murcia CF, Deportivo Alavés, AD Alcorcón and Racing de Santander. On 22 September 2020, he signed for Extremadura UD one division below.

== Career statistics ==
As of match played 9 May 2021

Appearances and goals by club, season and competition
Club	Season	League			National Cup		Other		Total	
Club	Season	Division	Apps	Goals	Apps	Goals	Apps	Goals	Apps	Goals
Terrassa (loan)	2008–09	Segunda División B	36	0	0	0	2 (Note: Appearances in Segunda División B play-offs)	0	38	0
Málaga	2009–10	La Liga	21	0	3	0	—		24	0
Ponferradina (loan)	2010–11	Segunda División	38	1	1	0	—		39	1
Villarreal B	2011–12	Segunda División	33	0	—		—		33	0
Villarreal	2012–13	Segunda División	5	0	1	0	—		6	0
Murcia	2012–13	Segunda División	15	0	0	0	—		15	0
Murcia	2013–14	Segunda División	33	0	1	0	2 (Note: Appearances in La Liga play-offs)	0	36	0
Murcia	Total		48	0	1	0	2	0	51	0
Alavés	2014–15	Segunda División	35	1	2	0	—		37	1
Alcorcón	2015–16	Segunda División	29	1	0	0	—		29	1
Alcorcón	2016–17	Segunda División	39	2	6	0	—		45	2
Alcorcón	2017–18	Segunda División	30	1	1	0	—		31	1
Alcorcón	2018–19	Segunda División	22	0	1	0	—		23	0
Alcorcón	Total		120	4	8	0	0	0	128	4
Racing Santander (loan)	2019–20	Segunda División	22	0	0	0	—		22	0
Extremadura	2020–21	Segunda División B	19	0	1	0	—		20	0
Career total			377	6	17	0	4	0	398	6
