= Federico Vega =

Argentine footballer

Fede Vega
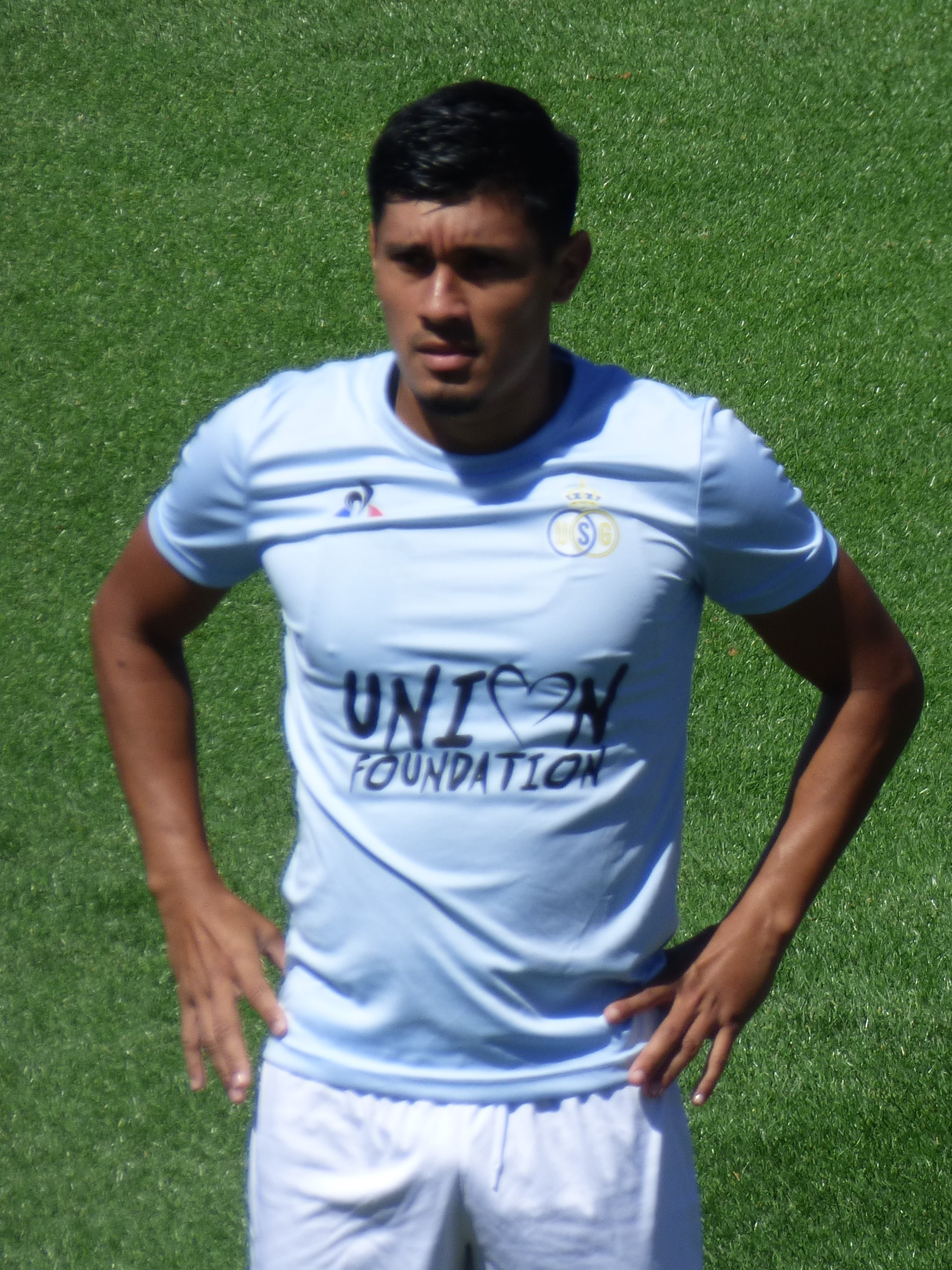
- 2020

Personal information
- Full name: Federico Darío José Vega
- Date of birth: 4 February 1993 (age 33)
- Place of birth: Don Torcuato, Argentina
- Height: 1.80 m (5 ft 11 in)
- Position: Right back

Team information
- Current team: Valletta
- Number: 44

Youth career
- 2004–2013: River Plate

Senior career*
Years	Team	Apps	(Gls)
2013–2015	River Plate	2	(0)
2015–2017	Alcorcón	47	(1)
2017–2018	Murcia	12	(0)
2018	Lorca	16	(0)
2018–2020	Union SG	25	(0)
2022–2023	Deportivo Merlo	11	(1)
2023	Liniers	6	(1)
2023–	Valletta	12	(0)

International career
2012	Argentina U20	1	(0)
- * Club domestic league appearances and goals as of 11 March 2024

Federico "Fede" Darío José Vega (born 4 February 1993) is an Argentine footballer who plays as a right back. He is currently playing for Valletta in the Maltese Premier League.

== Club career ==
Born in Don Torcuato, Buenos Aires Province, Vega joined River Plate's youth setup in 2004. In January 2013 he was called up to the main squad by manager Ramón Díaz for the pre-season, being subsequently promoted to the first team.

On 13 October 2013 Vega made his professional – and Primera División – debut, starting in a 0–1 away loss against Newell's Old Boys. After appearing in a 1–2 home loss against Estudiantes, he was demoted to the reserves, as Díaz was dismissed.

On 4 February 2015 Vega was released by River. Late in the month, he was linked to a possible move to FC Dallas, but nothing came of it.

In July 2015 Vega joined AD Alcorcón in Spain. Initially assigned to the reserves, he appeared the whole pre-season with the main squad and was granted a first team number on 19 August, being assigned #2 jersey.

Vega made his debut for the Alfareros on 9 September 2015, starting in a 0–1 Copa del Rey home defeat against SD Ponferradina. In late January 2016, he was chosen as first-choice by manager Juan Muñiz, and remained a starter until the end of the campaign.

On 22 June 2016, Vega renewed with Alcorcón for a further campaign. On 11 September he scored his first professional goal, netting the game's only in a home success over Gimnàstic de Tarragona.

On 28 June 2017, Vega left the club as his contract was due to expire, and joined Segunda División B side Real Murcia on 18 July. The following 31 January, he returned to the second tier after agreeing to a deal with Lorca FC.

== Honours ==
River Plate

- Argentina Primera Division: 2014 Final
- U-20 Copa Libertadores: 2012

=== Individual ===
- Proximus League Team of the Season: 2018–19
- Proximus League Team of the Season: 2019–20
