= Mario Ortiz (Spanish footballer) =

Spanish footballer

Personal information
- Full name: Mario Ortiz Ruiz
- Date of birth: 24 March 1989 (age 37)
- Place of birth: Santander, Spain
- Height: 1.73 m (5 ft 8 in)
- Position: Midfielder

Team information
- Current team: Atlético Albericia

Youth career
- Racing Santander

Senior career*
Years	Team	Apps	(Gls)
2007–2010	Racing B	47	(3)
2010–2012	Racing Santander	2	(0)
2010	→ Castellón (loan)	14	(0)
2010–2011	→ Conquense (loan)	35	(1)
2011–2012	→ Puertollano (loan)	27	(1)
2012–2013	Espanyol B	20	(2)
2013–2016	Albacete	109	(1)
2016–2018	Cultural Leonesa	75	(3)
2018–2019	Reus	21	(0)
2019–2020	Racing Santander	48	(0)
2020–2021	Córdoba	23	(1)
2021–2022	Hércules	14	(0)
2022	Pontevedra	14	(0)
2023	Algeciras	13	(0)
2023–2024	Vimenor	31	(1)
2024–	Atlético Albericia	60	(1)
- * Club domestic league appearances and goals as of 14:54, 27 September 2026 (UTC)

Mario Ortiz Ruiz (born 24 March 1989) is a Spanish professional footballer who plays as a midfielder for Tercera Federación club Atlético Albericia.

== Honours ==
Albacete

- Segunda División B: 2013–14

Cultural Leonesa

- Segunda División B: 2016–17
