= Víctor Pastrana =

Spanish footballer

Personal information
- Full name: Víctor Pastrana Carrasco
- Date of birth: 27 September 1996 (age 30)
- Place of birth: Guadalajara, Spain
- Height: 1.80 m (5 ft 11 in)
- Position: Winger

Team information
- Current team: Lugo
- Number: 11

Youth career
- Trival Valderas
- 2012–2015: Alcorcón

Senior career*
Years	Team	Apps	(Gls)
2015–2017	Alcorcón	34	(0)
2016–2017	→ Ponferradina (loan)	21	(0)
2017–2019	Celta B	61	(7)
2019–2022	Extremadura	67	(6)
2022–2024	Atlético Baleares	78	(9)
2024–2025	Alcoyano	34	(4)
2025–	Lugo	27	(1)

International career
2015	Spain U19	2	(0)
- * Club domestic league appearances and goals as of 9 June 2026

Víctor Pastrana Carrasco (born 27 September 1996) is a Spanish professional footballer who plays for Primera Federación club Lugo as a winger.

== Football career ==
Born in Guadalajara, Castile-La Mancha, Pastrana joined AD Alcorcón's youth setup in 2012, aged 15, after starting it out at CF Trival Valderas. In October 2014, before even having appeared for the reserves, he was called up to train with the main squad.

On 25 January 2015 Pastrana played his first match as a professional, coming on as a second half substitute for Kiko Femenía in a 2–3 home loss against Albacete Balompié in the Segunda División. Shortly after, he was definitely promoted to the first team.

On 21 July 2016, Pastrana was loaned to Segunda División B club SD Ponferradina, for one year. Upon returning, he cut ties with the club on 4 July 2017 and signed a two-year deal with Celta de Vigo B just hours later.

On 9 July 2019, free agent Pastrana signed a three-year contract with Extremadura UD in the second division.

== International career ==
On 8 February 2015 Pastrana was called up to the Spain under-19 team, and made his debut on 29 May, in a 4–1 routing of Georgia; he was the first Alcorcón player to appear in any international level for Spain.
