= 2022–23 Copa del Rey =

Tournament details
- Country: Spain
- Date: 19 October 2022 – 6 May 2023
- Teams: 125

Final positions
- Champions: Real Madrid (20th title)
- Runners-up: Osasuna

Tournament statistics
- Matches played: 126
- Goals scored: 359 (2.85 per match)
- Top goal scorer: Kike (5 goals)

The 2022–23 Copa del Rey was the 121st staging of the Copa del Rey (including two seasons where two rival editions were played), the oldest official football competition in Spain. The winners of the competition would have automatically qualified for the 2023–24 UEFA Europa League group stage; however, as Real Madrid had already qualified for European competition via league standings, their place was passed down to the sixth-placed team in La Liga and the UEFA Europa Conference League spot reserved for the sixth-placed team was awarded to the team who finished seventh in the league. Both the winners and runners-up qualified for the four-team 2024 Supercopa de España.

Real Betis were the defending champions, having beaten Valencia on penalties in the previous edition's final, but were eliminated in the round of 16 by Osasuna. Osasuna would go on to reach the 2023 final, where they lost 2–1 to Real Madrid. For Madrid, this was their twentieth Copa del Rey title, and first since 2014.

As across Spain, match times up to 30 October 2022 and from 26 March 2023 were CEST (UTC+2). Times on interim ("winter") days were CET (UTC+1). Matches played in the Canary Islands used the WET (UTC±00:00).

== Schedule and format ==
In the summer of 2022, the RFEF released the calendar of the competition and confirmed the format of the previous season would remain.

Round	Draw date	Date	Fixtures	Clubs	Format details
Preliminary round	3 October 2022	19 October 2022	10	125 → 115	New entries: Clubs qualify through the 2021–22 sixth tier. Opponents seeding: Teams faced each other according to proximity criteria. Local team seeding: Luck of the draw. Knock-out tournament type: Single match.
First round	24 October 2022	12-13 November 2022	55	115 → 60	New entries: All qualified teams except for the four participants in the Supercopa de España and champions of the 2021–22 Primera División RFEF. Opponents seeding: Teams from lowest divisions faced La Liga teams. Local team seeding: Matches were played at home stadiums of teams in lower divisions. Knock-out tournament type: Single match.
Second round	16 November 2022	20–22 December 2022	28	60 → 32	New entries: 2021–22 Primera División RFEF champions entered at this stage. Opponents seeding: Teams from lowest divisions face La Liga teams. Local team seeding: Matches were played at home stadiums of teams in lower divisions. Knock-out tournament type: Single match.
Round of 32	23 December 2022	3–5 January 2023	16	32 → 16	New entries: Clubs participating in the Supercopa de España entered at this stage. Opponents seeding: Teams from lowest divisions faced La Liga teams. Local team seeding: Matches were played at home stadiums of teams in lower divisions. Knock-out tournament type: Single match.
Round of 16	7 January 2023	17–19 January 2023	8	16 → 8	Opponents seeding: Teams from lowest divisions faced La Liga teams. Local team seeding: Matches were played at home stadiums of teams in lower divisions. Knock-out tournament type: Single match.
Quarter-finals	20 January 2023	25-26 January 2023	4	8 → 4	Opponents seeding: Luck of the draw. Local team seeding: Matches were played at home stadiums of teams in lower divisions. Knock-out tournament type: Single match.
Semi-finals	30 January 2023	1-2 March 2023	2	4 → 2	Opponents seeding: Luck of the draw. Local team seeding: Luck of the draw. Knock-out tournament type: Double match.
Semi-finals	30 January 2023	4–5 April 2023	2	4 → 2	Opponents seeding: Luck of the draw. Local team seeding: Luck of the draw. Knock-out tournament type: Double match.
Final	30 January 2023	6 May 2023	1	2 → 1	Single match at Estadio de La Cartuja, Seville. Both teams qualified for the 2024 Supercopa de España. UEFA Europa League qualification: winners qualified for the 2023–24 UEFA Europa League group stage.

Notes

- Games ending in a draw were decided in extra time and, if still level, by a penalty shoot-out.

== Qualified teams ==
The following teams qualified for the competition. Reserve teams were not allowed to enter.

La Liga; All 20 teams of the 2021–22 season	Segunda División; All 21 non-reserve teams of the 2021–22 season	Primera División RFEF; Top five non-reserve teams of each group of the 2021–22 season	Segunda División RFEF; Top five non-reserve teams of the five groups of the 2021–22 season	Tercera División RFEF; The best non-reserve teams plus the best seven non-reserve runners-up of each one of the eighteen groups of the 2021–22 season	Copa Federación; The four semi-finalists of the 2022 Copa Federación de España	Regional leagues The best non-promoted teams of the twenty groups of the sixth tier in the 2021–22 season
Alavés; Athletic Bilbao; Atlético Madrid; Barcelona (Note: Barcelona, Real Betis, Real Madrid and Valencia joined the tournament in the round of 32 as participants of the Supercopa de España.); Cádiz; Celta Vigo; Elche; Espanyol; Getafe; Granada; Levante; Mallorca; Osasuna; Rayo Vallecano; Real Betis^{TH}; Real Madrid; Real Sociedad; Sevilla; Valencia; Villarreal	Alcorcón; Almería; Amorebieta; Burgos; Cartagena; Eibar; Fuenlabrada; Girona; Huesca; Ibiza; Las Palmas; Leganés; Lugo; Málaga; Mirandés; Ponferradina; Oviedo; Sporting de Gijón; Tenerife; Valladolid; Zaragoza	Albacete; Andorra; Atlético Baleares; Deportivo La Coruña; Gimnàstic; Linares; Racing Ferrol; Racing Santander (Note: Racing Santander joined the tournament in the second round as champions of the 2021–22 Primera División RFEF.); Rayo Majadahonda; UD Logroñés	Arenas; Cacereño; Ceuta; Córdoba; Coria; Coruxo; Cristo Atlético; Eldense; Gernika; Hércules; Ibiza Islas Pitiusas; Intercity; La Nucía; Lleida Esportiu; Mérida; Murcia; Numancia; Peña Deportiva; Pontevedra; Navalcarnero; Racing Rioja; San Juan; Sestao River; Teruel; Unión Adarve	Alfaro; Almazán; Arnedo; Atlético Paso; Atlético Saguntino; Beasain; Cirbonero; Diocesano; Gim. Torrelavega; Guadalajara; Guijuelo; Huétor Tájar; Juventud Torremolinos; Las Rozas; Lealtad; Manacor; Manresa; Olot; Ourense; Quintanar del Rey; Recreativo; Utebo; Utrera; Vimenor; Yeclano	Alzira; Arenteiro; Real Unión; San Roque Lepe	Algar; Amigó; Atlético Lugones; Autol; Barbadás; Cardassar; Cazalegas; Ceuta 6 de Junio; Dinamo San Juan; Fuentes; L'Alcora; Los Yébenes San Bruno; Melilla CD; Mollerussa; Montilla; Rincón; Santa Amalia; Turégano; Universitario; Velarde

== Preliminary round ==
=== Draw ===
Teams were divided into four groups according to geographical criteria.

Group 1	Group 2	Group 3	Group 4
Atlético Lugones; Autol; Barbadás; Dinamo San Juan; Turégano; Velarde	Amigó; Cardassar; Fuentes; Mollerussa	Algar; Ceuta 6 de Junio; L'Alcora; Melilla CD; Montilla; Rincón	Cazalegas; Los Yébenes San Bruno; Santa Amalia; Universitario

=== Matches ===
19 October 2022	Ceuta 6 de Junio (6)	0–3	L'Alcora (6)	Ceuta
19:30			Albalat 1'; Navalón 66' (pen.); Clemente 84' (pen.)	Stadium: Estadio José Martínez "Pirri"; Referee: Juan José Huertas Marqués

19 October 2022	Amigó (7)	0–3	Fuentes (6)	Mutilva (Note: Amigó did not play the game in their main stadium Colegio Luis Amigó, Aranguren, as it did not meet the broadcasting requirements.)
19:30			Tobajas 20', 32'; Gutiérrez 65'	Stadium: Mutilnova; Referee: Rodrigo Sánchez Murcia

19 October 2022	Velarde (6)	1–0	Turégano (6)	Muriedas
20:00	Incera 85'			Stadium: La Maruca; Referee: Pelayo Quirós Pérez

19 October 2022	Autol (6)	1–1 (a.e.t.) (8–7 p)	Dinamo San Juan (6)	Autol
20:00	Fran 117'		Hierro 104'	Stadium: La Manzanera; Referee: Javier Fernández Santesteban
	Penalties
	Palacios (penalty scored); Manrique (penalty scored); I. Gil (penalty missed); Fran (penalty scored); Ruben (penalty scored); Giovanny (penalty scored); J. Gil (penalty scored); Quiroz (penalty scored); Víctor (penalty scored)		(penalty scored) Herrero; (penalty scored) Rojas; (penalty scored) Gaizka; (penalty missed) Ruiz; (penalty scored) Ekaitz; (penalty scored) Goiko; (penalty scored) Manzano; (penalty scored) Pozuelo; (penalty missed) Hierro

19 October 2022	Algar (6)	4–1	Melilla CD (6)	El Algar
20:00	Carrasco 7', 48'; Ketchup 43'; Moghli 54'		Rodríguez 15'	Stadium: Sánchez Luengo; Referee: Salvador Carrillo García

19 October 2022	Santa Amalia (6)	2–1	Universitario (6)	Santa Amalia
20:00	Rubio 25'; Rico 89'		Manford 72'	Stadium: Municipal; Referee: Miguel Gómez Blázquez

19 October 2022	Barbadás (6)	2–1	Atlético Lugones (6)	Barbadás
20:30	Isma 40'; Xinzo 67'		Basualdo 74'	Stadium: Os Carrís; Referee: Alejandro Fernández Rodríguez

19 October 2022	Mollerussa (6)	4–2 (a.e.t.)	Cardassar (6)	Mollerussa
20:30	A. Rodríguez 13', 102'; G. Soldevila 35'; Totti 120+2'		Coll 25'; Álvaro 53'	Stadium: Camp Municipal; Referee: Andrés Nadal Avellanas

19 October 2022	Montilla (6)	0–0 (a.e.t.) (3–5 p)	Rincón (6)	Montilla
20:30				Stadium: Municipal; Referee: Pablo Pardos Matamoros
	Penalties
	Rosa (penalty missed); Manuel (penalty scored); Salvi (penalty scored); Manolete (penalty scored)		(penalty scored) Joki; (penalty scored) Semi; (penalty scored) Álvaro; (penalty scored) Yeray; (penalty scored) Molina

19 October 2022	Cazalegas (6)	2–1 (a.e.t.)	Los Yébenes San Bruno (6)	Cazalegas
20:30	Barrientos 17'; Ramos 109'		Juarez 82'	Stadium: Ébora Formación; Referee: Carlos Agraz Díaz

== First round ==
The first round was played by 110 of the 115 qualified teams, with the exceptions being the four participants of the 2023 Supercopa de España and Primera RFEF champions. The ten winners from the previous preliminary round were paired with ten teams from La Liga. The four Copa Federación semi-finalists were drawn with the other four teams from La Liga, and the last two La Liga teams were drawn with the teams from the Tercera RFEF. The last five teams from the Tercera RFEF were paired with five teams from the Segunda División. The last fifteen teams from Segunda División were paired with fifteen teams from the Segunda RFEF. Finally, the nineteen teams from the Segunda RFEF were paired with the nineteen teams from the Primera RFEF.

A total of 55 games were played on 12 and 13 November 2022.

=== Draw ===
The draw was held on 24 October 2022. Teams were divided into seven pots.

Pot 1; 16 teams of La Liga	Pot 2; 20 teams of Segunda División	Pot 3; 19 teams of Primera Federación	Pot 4; 34 teams of Segunda Federación	Pot 5; 7 teams of Tercera Federación	Pot 6; 4 teams qualified through the Copa Federación	Pot 7; 10 winners of the preliminary round
Almería; Athletic Bilbao; Atlético Madrid; Cádiz; Celta Vigo; Elche; Espanyol; Getafe; Girona; Mallorca; Osasuna; Rayo Vallecano; Real Sociedad; Sevilla; Valladolid; Villarreal	Alavés; Albacete; Andorra; Burgos; Cartagena; Eibar; Granada; Huesca; Ibiza; Las Palmas; Leganés; Levante; Lugo; Málaga; Mirandés; Ponferradina; Oviedo; Sporting Gijón; Tenerife; Zaragoza	Alcorcón; Amorebieta; Atlético Baleares; Ceuta; Córdoba; Deportivo La Coruña; Eldense; Fuenlabrada; Gimnàstic; Intercity; La Nucía; Linares; Mérida; Murcia; Numancia; Pontevedra; Racing Ferrol; Rayo Majadahonda; UD Logroñés	Alfaro; Arenas; Arnedo; Atlético Paso; Atlético Saguntino; Beasain; Cacereño; Cirbonero; Coria; Coruxo; Cristo Atlético; Diocesano; Gernika; Gim. Torrelavega; Guadalajara; Guijuelo; Hércules; Ibiza Islas Pitiusas; Juventud Torremolinos; Lleida Esportiu; Manresa; Navalcarnero; Olot; Ourense; Peña Deportiva; Racing Rioja; Recreativo; San Juan; Sestao River; Teruel; Unión Adarve; Utebo; Utrera; Yeclano	Almazán; Huétor Tájar; Las Rozas; Lealtad; Manacor; Quintanar del Rey; Vimenor	Alzira; Arenteiro; Real Unión; San Roque Lepe	Algar; Autol; Barbadás; Cazalegas; Fuentes; L'Alcora; Mollerussa; Rincón; Santa Amalia; Velarde

=== Matches ===
12 November 2022	Fuentes (6)	1–4	Osasuna (1)	Fuentes de Ebro
16:00	Requeno 44'	Report	Brašanac 42'; Vidal 49'; Kike 54', 64'	Stadium: San Miguel; Referee: José Luis Munuera Montero

12 November 2022	Barbadás (6)	0–2	Valladolid (1)	Ourense (Note: Barbadás did not play the game in their main stadium Os Carrís, Barbadás, as it did not meet the broadcasting requirements.)
16:00		Report	Faria 12' (o.g.); León 39'	Stadium: O Couto; Referee: Pablo González Fuertes

12 November 2022	Manacor (5)	1–3	Andorra (2)	Manacor
16:00	Rubio 60'	Report	Casadesús 35'; Fernández 50'; Jacobo 55'	Stadium: Na Capellera; Referee: Iván Caparrós Hernández

12 November 2022	Olot (4)	0–4	Levante (2)	Olot
17:00		Report	Soldado 6', 26'; Pubill 32'; Aimar 35' (o.g.)	Stadium: Municipal; Referee: Mateo Busquets Ferrer

12 November 2022	Guijuelo (4)	2–0	Deportivo La Coruña (3)	Guijuelo
17:00	Carmona 70'; Zalazar 72' (o.g.)	Report		Stadium: Municipal; Referee: Antonio Sánchez Sánchez

12 November 2022	Atlético Saguntino (4)	1–0 (a.e.t.)	Amorebieta (3)	Sagunto
17:00	Acevedo 116' (pen.)	Report		Stadium: Morvedre; Referee: José Antonio Sánchez Villalobos

12 November 2022	Navalcarnero (4)	1–3 (a.e.t.)	UD Logroñés (3)	Navalcarnero
17:00	Rodríguez 65'	Report	Schutte 86'; Mendes 93', 104'	Stadium: Mariano González; Referee: Juan Antonio Manrique Antequera

12 November 2022	Huétor Tájar (5)	0–3 (a.e.t.)	Albacete (2)	Huétor-Tájar
18:00		Report	R. Martínez 104'; Dubasin 110'; Mesa 118'	Stadium: Miguel Moranto; Referee: Rafael Sánchez López

12 November 2022	Guadalajara (4)	2–1	Ponferradina (2)	Guadalajara
18:00	Gallardo 11'; Santiago 21'	Report	Naranjo 77'	Stadium: Pedro Escartín; Referee: Saúl Ais Reig

12 November 2022	Gernika (4)	0–0 (a.e.t.) (6–5 p)	Leganés (2)	Gernika
18:00		Report		Stadium: Urbieta; Referee: José Antonio López Toca
	Penalties
	Navarro (penalty scored); Aguirre (penalty scored); Juwara (penalty scored); Iriondo (penalty scored); Berasaluze (penalty scored); Carpio (penalty scored)		(penalty scored) Muñoz; (penalty scored) Arnaiz; (penalty scored) Raba; (penalty scored) Cissé; (penalty scored) Pardo; (penalty missed) García

12 November 2022	Arenas (4)	1–0	Lugo (2)	Getxo
18:00	Gomeza 75'	Report		Stadium: Gobela; Referee: Luis Mario Milla Alvendiz

12 November 2022	Beasain (4)	2–3 (a.e.t.)	Sporting Gijón (2)	Beasain
18:00	Sanz 25'; Pita 56'	Report	Đurđević 8'; Rivera 75'; C. González 120'	Stadium: Loinaz; Referee: Raúl Martín González Francés

12 November 2022	Racing Rioja (4)	0–2	Gimnàstic (3)	Logroño
18:00		Report	Lupu 12'; Montes 26'	Stadium: Las Gaunas (Note: Racing Rioja did not play the game in their main stadium El Salvador as it did not meet the broadcasting requirements.); Referee: Sergio Escriche Gúzman

12 November 2022	Sestao River (4)	1–0	Racing Ferrol (3)	Sestao
18:00	L. Martínez 47'	Report		Stadium: Las Llanas; Referee: Alberto Fuente Martín

12 November 2022	Utrera (4)	0–1	Ceuta (3)	Utrera
18:00		Report	Rodri 84'	Stadium: San Juan Bosco; Referee: Manuel Ángel Pérez Hernández

12 November 2022	L'Alcora (6)	0–3	Elche (1)	Villarreal (Note: L'Alcora did not play the game in their main stadium El Saltador, L'Alcora, as it did not meet the broadcasting requirements.)
18:30		Report	Ponce 2'; Roger 13', 66'	Stadium: Ciudad Deportiva; Referee: José María Sánchez Martínez

12 November 2022	Autol (6)	0–6	Mallorca (1)	Calahorra (Note: Autol did not play the game in their main stadium La Manzanera, Autol, as it did not meet the broadcasting requirements.)
18:30		Report	Prats 16', 35'; Grenier 18'; Ángel 29', 72'; Kadewere 88'	Stadium: La Planilla; Referee: Javier Iglesias Villanueva

12 November 2022	Cristo Atlético (4)	0–2 (a.e.t.)	Ibiza (2)	Palencia
20:00		Report	Herrera 98'; Camara 119'	Stadium: Nueva Balastera; Referee: Adrián Cordero Vega

12 November 2022	Cacereño (4)	3–0	Córdoba (3)	Cáceres
20:00	Fernández 10'; Solano 46' (pen.); Garcí 83'	Report		Stadium: Príncipe Felipe; Referee: Alfonso Vicente Moral

12 November 2022	Coria (4)	2–0	Fuenlabrada (3)	Coria
20:00	Bernardo 41'; Cera 55'	Report		Stadium: La Isla; Referee: Manuel Jesús Orellana Cid

12 November 2022	Santa Amalia (6)	0–9	Villarreal (1)	Almendralejo (Note: Santa Amalia did not play the game in their main stadium Municipal, Santa Amalia, as it did not meet the broadcasting requirements.)
21:00		Report	Collado 31'; Baena 35'; Morales 36'; Chukwueze 47', 49'; Coquelin 61'; Gerard 74', 87'; Capoue 80'	Stadium: Francisco de la Hera; Referee: Jorge Figueroa Vázquez

12 November 2022	Rincón (6)	0–3	Espanyol (1)	Málaga (Note: Rincón did not play the game in their main stadium Francisco Romero, Rincón de la Victoria, as it did not meet the broadcasting requirements.)
21:00		Report	Puado 60'; Expósito 70'; Joselu 83'	Stadium: La Rosaleda; Referee: Valentín Pizarro Gómez

12 November 2022	Almazán (5)	0–2	Atlético Madrid (1)	Soria (Note: Almazán did not play the game in their main stadium La Arboleda, Almazán, as it did not meet the broadcasting requirements.)
22:00		Report	Correa 35'; Félix 63'	Stadium: Los Pajaritos; Referee: Isidro Díaz de Mera Escuderos

13 November 2022	Atlético Paso (4)	1–1 (a.e.t.) (3–2 p)	Murcia (3)	El Paso
11:00WET	Zabaleta 86'	Report	Carrasco 15' (pen.)	Stadium: El Paso; Referee: David López Jiménez
	Penalties
	Armiche (penalty missed); Oca (penalty scored); Cruz (penalty missed); Piera (penalty missed); Pelón (penalty scored); Zabaleta (penalty scored)		(penalty missed) Miku; (penalty scored) Inoussa; (penalty scored) Solà; (penalty missed) Arn. Ortiz; (penalty missed) Ganet; (penalty missed) Vega

13 November 2022	Mollerussa (6)	1–3	Rayo Vallecano (1)	Mollerussa
12:00	Magno 33'	Report	Bebé 23'; Méndez 51'; Camello 78'	Stadium: Camp Municipal; Referee: César Soto Grado

13 November 2022	Quintanar del Rey (5)	1–2 (a.e.t.)	Girona (1)	Quintanar del Rey
12:00	Megías 76' (pen.)	Report	Riquelme 17'; Stuani 97'	Stadium: San Marcos; Referee: Carlos del Cerro Grande

13 November 2022	Vimenor (5)	0–2	Mirandés (2)	Piélagos
12:00		Report	López 31'; Marcos Paulo 37'	Stadium: La Vidriera; Referee: Iosu Galech Apezteguía

13 November 2022	Diocesano (4)	1–0	Zaragoza (2)	Arroyo de la Luz (Note: Diocesano did not play the game in their main stadium Campo de la Federación, Cáceres, as it did not meet the broadcasting requirements.)
12:00	Sales 29' (pen.)	Report		Stadium: Municipal; Referee: Alejandro Quintero González

13 November 2022	Lealtad (5)	0–2	Tenerife (2)	Langreo (Note: Lealtad did not play the game in their main stadium Les Caleyes, Villaviciosa, as it did not meet the broadcasting requirements.)
12:00		Report	Alassan 3'; Elady 84' (pen.)	Stadium: Estadio Ganzábal; Referee: Óliver de la Fuente Ramos

13 November 2022	Las Rozas (5)	0–3	Eibar (2)	Las Rozas
12:00		Report	Blanco Leschuk 74', 78'; Muñoz 89'	Stadium: Navalcarbón; Referee: Daniel Jesús Trujillo Suárez

13 November 2022	Peña Deportiva (4)	1–1 (a.e.t.) (7–8 p)	Málaga (2)	Santa Eulària des Riu
12:00	Cristeto 33' (pen.)	Report	Sol 43'	Stadium: Municipal; Referee: Álvaro Moreno Aragón
	Penalties
	Cruz (penalty scored); Cristeto (penalty scored); Sánchez (penalty scored); Badal (penalty scored); Albert (penalty scored); Moreno (penalty scored); Cámara (penalty scored); Ripoll (penalty missed)		(penalty scored) Chavarría; (penalty scored) Sol; (penalty scored) Burgos; (penalty scored) Genaro; (penalty scored) Lorenzo; (penalty scored) Abaida; (penalty scored) N'Diaye; (penalty scored) Lumor

13 November 2022	Alfaro (4)	0–1	Cartagena (2)	Alfaro
12:00		Report	Ortuño 83'	Stadium: La Molineta; Referee: Rubén Ávalos Barrera

13 November 2022	Recreativo (4)	0–0 (a.e.t.) (3–4 p)	Burgos (2)	Huelva
12:00		Report		Stadium: Nuevo Colombino; Referee: Francisco José Hernández Maeso
	Penalties
	Díaz (penalty missed); Galán (penalty scored); Arjona (penalty missed); Dopi (penalty scored); Martínez (penalty scored)		(penalty scored) Bermejo; (penalty scored) Curro; (penalty missed) Atienza; (penalty scored) Campos; (penalty scored) Elgezabal

13 November 2022	Gimnástica Torrelavega (4)	2–3 (a.e.t.)	Oviedo (2)	Torrelavega
12:00	Marotías 54'; Chamorro 89'	Report	Bastón 7', 50'; Sangalli 114'	Stadium: Campos del Malecón; Referee: Jon Ander González Esteban

13 November 2022	Juventud Torremolinos (4)	2–2 (a.e.t.) (4–2 p)	Huesca (2)	Torremolinos
12:00	López 23'; Chamorro 30'	Report	Escriche 52'; Villar 72'	Stadium: El Pozuelo; Referee: David Gálvez Rascón
	Penalties
	Amaya (penalty scored); Machuca (penalty scored); García (penalty scored); Pesca (penalty scored)		(penalty scored) Villar; (penalty missed) Joaquín; (penalty scored) Salvador; (penalty missed) Vilarrasa

13 November 2022	Ibiza Islas Pitiusas (4)	3–1	Rayo Majadahonda (3)	Ibiza
12:00	Bernal 62'; Adell 74'; Peñafort 90+6'	Report	Casado 55'	Stadium: Can Misses III; Referee: Carlos Calderiña Pavón

13 November 2022	Manresa (4)	1–3	Pontevedra (3)	Manresa
12:00	Churre 1' (o.g.)	Report	Abelenda 29', 58'; Pino 32'	Stadium: Municipal del Congost; Referee: Francisco Javier Fernández Vidal

13 November 2022	Arnedo (4)	1–1 (a.e.t.) (4–3 p)	Atlético Baleares (3)	Arnedo
12:00	Arpón 74'	Report	Adighibe 34'	Stadium: Sendero; Referee: Armando Ramo Andrés
	Penalties
	Chacón (penalty missed); Maestresalas (penalty missed); Benito (penalty scored); Amelivia (penalty scored); Míchel (penalty scored); Pascual (penalty scored)		(penalty missed) Martín; (penalty scored) Miguelete; (penalty scored) Dioni; (penalty scored) Kaxe; (penalty missed) Pastrana; (penalty missed) Olaortua

13 November 2022	Unión Adarve (4)	1–2	Linares (3)	Madrid
12:00	Paris 59'	Report	Callejón 33'; García 43'	Stadium: Román Valero (Note: Unión Adarve did not play the game in their main stadium Vicente del Bosque as it did not meet the broadcasting requirements.); Referee: Jorge Tarraga Lajara

13 November 2022	Hércules (4)	2–4 (a.e.t.)	La Nucía (3)	Alicante
12:00	Truyols 58'; Harper 63'	Report	Pina 52'; Raigal 76', 98'; Romera 119'	Stadium: José Rico Pérez; Referee: Fulgencio Madrid Martínez

13 November 2022	Velarde (6)	0–2	Sevilla (1)	Muriedas
16:00		Report	Nianzou 30'; Mir 90'	Stadium: La Maruca; Referee: Alejandro Muñiz Ruiz

13 November 2022	Algar (6)	1–6	Celta Vigo (1)	Lorca (Note: Algar did not play the game in their main stadium Sánchez Luengo, El Algar, as it did not meet the broadcasting requirements.)
16:00	Muñoz 15'	Report	Cervi 35'; Pérez 55'; Óscar 59'; Larsen 62'; Galán 84' (pen.); Vázquez 90+1'	Stadium: Francisco Artés Carrasco; Referee: Dámaso Arcediano Monescillo

13 November 2022	Cirbonero (4)	0–1	Intercity (3)	Corella (Note: Cirbonero did not play the game in their main stadium San Juan, Cintruénigo, as it did not meet the broadcasting requirements.)
16:00		Report	Gálvez 52'	Stadium: Ombatillo; Referee: Antonio Monter Solans

13 November 2022	Teruel (4)	0–1	Las Palmas (2)	Teruel
16:30		Report	Pejiño 55'	Stadium: Pinilla; Referee: Andrés Fuentes Molina

13 November 2022	Yeclano (4)	2–3	Granada (2)	Yecla
17:00	Clemente 78'; Revilla 90+3'	Report	Miquel 20'; R. Sánchez 41'; Molina 65'	Stadium: La Constitución; Referee: Víctor García Verdura

13 November 2022	Coruxo (4)	2–2 (a.e.t.) (2–4 p)	Eldense (3)	Vigo
17:00	Chiqui 3'; Dovale 120+2' (pen.)	Report	Montes 90+2'; Clemente 113'	Stadium: O Vao; Referee: Carlos Fernández Buergo
	Penalties
	Andriu (penalty missed); Dovale (penalty scored); Añón (penalty scored); De Vicente (penalty missed)		(penalty scored) Cristian; (penalty scored) Martínez; (penalty scored) Montes; (penalty scored) S. Ortuño

13 November 2022	San Juan (4)	0–2	Numancia (3)	Pamplona
17:00		Report	Carrillo 54'; Mesa 72'	Stadium: San Juan; Referee: Gorka Etayo Herrara

13 November 2022	Ourense (4)	1–1 (a.e.t.) (2–4 p)	Alcorcón (3)	Ourense
17:00	Nwenyi 38'	Report	Moyano 90'	Stadium: O Couto; Referee: Miguel González Díaz
	Penalties
	Borja Domingo (penalty scored); Ramos (penalty missed); Rodríguez (penalty scored); Sanz (penalty missed)		(penalty scored) Chiki; (penalty scored) Rivas; (penalty scored) Bustos; (penalty scored) P. García

13 November 2022	Lleida Esportiu (4)	0–1	Alavés (2)	Lleida
18:00		Report	Hara 47'	Stadium: Camp d'Esports; Referee: José Luis Guzmán Mansilla

13 November 2022	Utebo (4)	2–2 (a.e.t.) (3–4 p)	Mérida (3)	Utebo
18:00	Rosas 18'; Aso 47'	Report	Ruiz 13'; Sandoval 73'	Stadium: Santa Ana; Referee: Imanol Irurtzun Artola
	Penalties
	Rosas (penalty scored); Di. Suárez (penalty missed); Garcés (penalty missed); Mallada (penalty scored); Meseguer (penalty scored)		(penalty scored) Bonaque; (penalty scored) Larrubia; (penalty scored) González; (penalty missed) Cinta; (penalty scored) Artiles

13 November 2022	Real Unión (3)	3–2	Cádiz (1)	Irun
18:30	Nacho 16', 90+3'; Pérez 79'	Report	Pérez 15'; Negredo 81'	Stadium: Stadium Gal; Referee: Miguel Ángel Ortiz Arias

13 November 2022	San Roque Lepe (4)	2–3 (a.e.t.)	Getafe (1)	Lepe
18:30	Vázquez 19'; Santisteban 90+5'	Report	Latasa 48'; Ünal 80'; Mayoral 99'	Stadium: Ciudad de Lepe; Referee: Jesús Gil Manzano

13 November 2022	Cazalegas (6)	1–4	Real Sociedad (1)	Talavera de la Reina (Note: Cazalegas did not play the game in their main stadium Ébora Formación, Cazalegas, as it did not meet the broadcasting requirements.)
19:00	Rivera 68'	Report	Navarro 2'; Sørloth 76', 78'; Merino 80'	Stadium: El Prado; Referee: Mario Melero López

13 November 2022	Alzira (4)	0–2	Athletic Bilbao (1)	Alzira
21:00		Report	Berenguer 16'; N. Williams 42'	Stadium: Luis Suñer Picó; Referee: Guillermo Cuadra Fernández

13 November 2022	Arenteiro (4)	2–0	Almería (1)	O Carballiño
21:00	Escobar 4'; Mella 79'	Report		Stadium: Espiñedo; Referee: Juan Luis Pulido Santana

== Second round ==
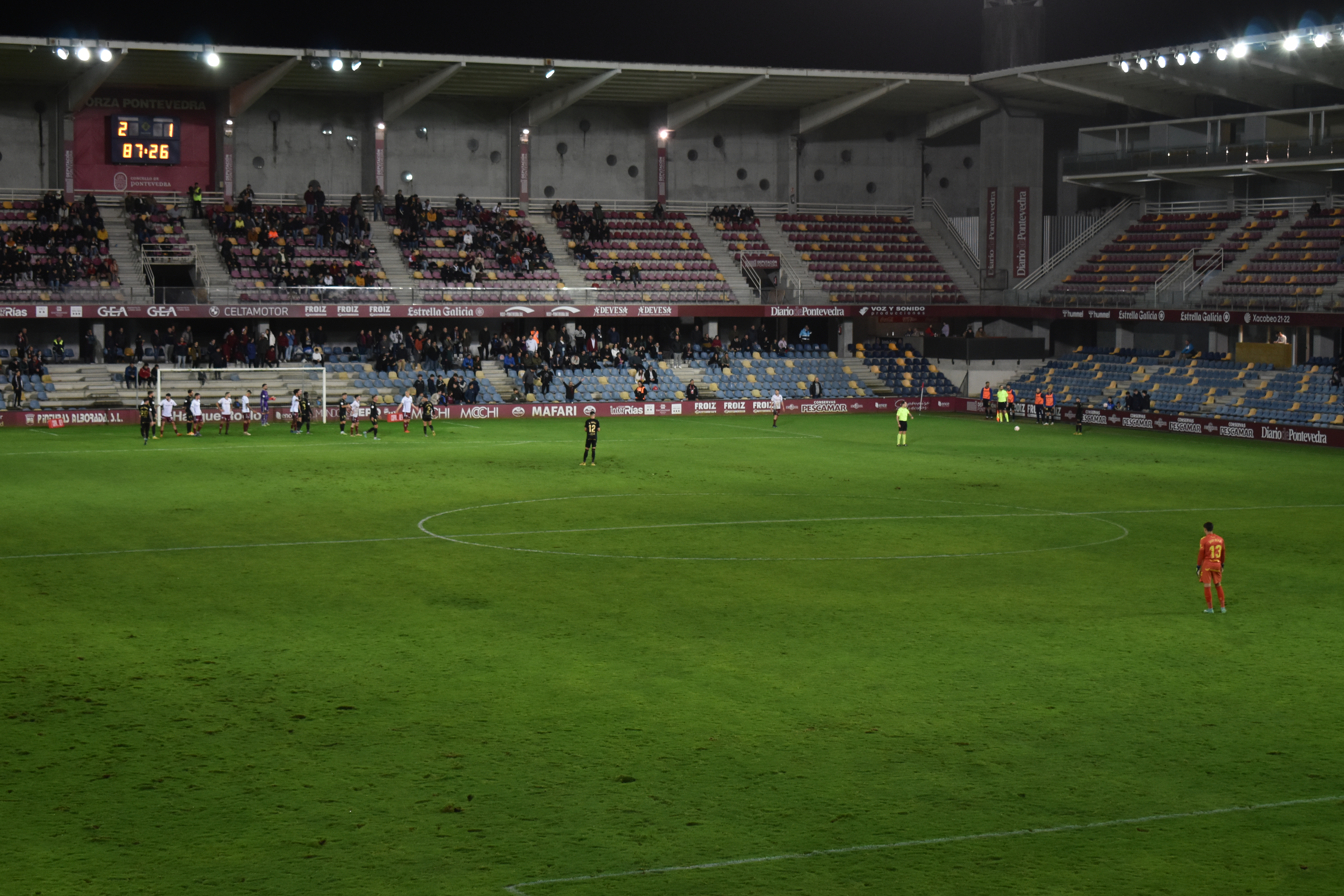
Pontevedra – Tenerife match.

=== Draw ===
The draw was held on 16 November 2022 in the RFEF headquarters in Las Rozas. The Primera RFEF champions entered in this round. Teams were divided into five pots according to their division in the 2022–23 season. Matches were played at the stadiums of lower-ranked teams. A total of 28 games were played from 20 to 22 December 2022.

Pot 1; 14 teams of La Liga	Pot 2; 16 teams of Segunda División	Pot 3; 11 teams of Primera RFEF	Pot 4; 13 teams of Segunda RFEF	Pot 5; 2 teams qualified through the Copa Federación
Athletic Bilbao; Atlético Madrid; Celta Vigo; Elche; Espanyol; Getafe; Girona; Mallorca; Osasuna; Rayo Vallecano; Real Sociedad; Sevilla; Valladolid; Villarreal	Alavés; Albacete; Andorra; Burgos; Cartagena; Eibar; Granada; Ibiza; Las Palmas; Levante; Málaga; Mirandés; Oviedo; Racing Santander; Sporting Gijón; Tenerife	Alcorcón; Ceuta; Eldense; Gimnàstic; Intercity; La Nucía; Linares; Mérida; Numancia; Pontevedra; UD Logroñés	Arnedo; Arenas Getxo; Atlético Paso; Atlético Saguntino; Cacereño; Coria; Diocesano; Gernika; Guadalajara; Guijuelo; Ibiza Islas Pitiusas; Juventud Torremolinos; Sestao River	Arenteiro; Real Unión

=== Matches ===
20 December 2022	Guadalajara (4)	0–3	Elche (1)	Guadalajara
19:00		Report	Milla 5'; Ponce 82'; Morente 90+2'	Stadium: Pedro Escartín; Attendance: 3,000; Referee: José Luis Munuera Montero

20 December 2022	Diocesano (4)	0–2	Getafe (1)	Arroyo de la Luz (Note: Diocesano did not play the match in their main stadium Campo de la Federación, Cáceres, as it did not meet the broadcasting requirements.)
19:00		Report	Munir 31', 53'	Stadium: Municipal; Attendance: 1,350; Referee: Jorge Figueroa Vázquez

20 December 2022	Intercity (3)	2–0	Mirandés (2)	Alicante
19:00	Soldevila 7'; Marí 66'	Report		Stadium: Antonio Solana; Attendance: 800; Referee: Rubén Ávalos Barrera

20 December 2022	Real Unión (3)	0–1	Mallorca (1)	Irun
21:00		Report	Rodríguez 20'	Stadium: Stadium Gal; Attendance: 3,000; Referee: Juan Luis Pulido Santana

20 December 2022	Sestao River (4)	0–1	Athletic Bilbao (1)	Sestao
21:00		Report	R. García 32'	Stadium: Las Llanas; Referee: Javier Iglesias Villanueva

20 December 2022	Guijuelo (4)	1–2 (a.e.t.)	Villarreal (1)	Guijuelo
21:00	Carmona 14'	Report	Gerard 41' (pen.); Danjuma 93'	Stadium: Municipal; Referee: Valentín Pizarro Gómez

20 December 2022	Atlético Paso (4)	0–1	Espanyol (1)	El Paso
21:00 WET		Report	Melamed 80'	Stadium: Municipal; Referee: César Soto Grado

20 December 2022	Alcorcón (3)	1–1 (a.e.t.) (2–4 p)	Cartagena (2)	Alcorcón
21:00	Bravo 55'	Report	Feuillassier 73'	Stadium: Santo Domingo; Referee: Saúl Ais Reig
	Penalties
	Chiki (penalty missed); Bustos (penalty missed); Rivas (penalty scored); P. García (penalty scored)		(penalty missed) De Blasis; (penalty scored) Sadiku; (penalty scored) Ortuño; (penalty scored) Datković; (penalty scored) Musto

21 December 2022	Atlético Saguntino (4)	0–0 (a.e.t.) (1–3 p)	Rayo Vallecano (1)	Sagunto
19:00		Report		Stadium: Morvedre; Referee: Guillermo Cuadra Fernández
	Penalties
	Torrent (penalty missed); Carlos David (penalty missed); Serrano (penalty scored); Ramón (penalty missed)		(penalty scored) Falcao; (penalty scored) Palazón; (penalty scored) Suárez

21 December 2022	Ibiza Islas Pitiusas (4)	1–0	Eibar (2)	Ibiza
19:15	Antonio 69'	Report		Stadium: Can Misses III; Referee: Andrés Fuentes Molina

21 December 2022	Mérida (3)	0–1	Alavés (2)	Mérida
19:00		Report	Sevilla 25'	Stadium: Romano; Referee: Óliver de la Fuente Ramos

21 December 2022	Numancia (3)	0–3	Sporting Gijón (2)	Soria
19:00		Report	Milovanović 7', 9'; García 90+3'	Stadium: Los Pajaritos; Referee: Adrián Cordero Vega

21 December 2022	Levante (2)	2–1	Andorra (2)	Valencia
19:00	Brugué 12'; Cantero 42'	Report	Gil 59'	Stadium: Ciutat de València; Referee: Iosu Galech Apezteguía

21 December 2022	Arenas Getxo (4)	1–5	Valladolid (1)	Getxo
21:00	Bengoetxea 29'	Report	Escudero 35'; Weissman 45'; I. Sánchez 53'; Kike 76'; León 81'	Stadium: Gobela; Referee: Carlos del Cerro Grande

21 December 2022	Juventud Torremolinos (4)	0–3	Sevilla (1)	Torremolinos
21:00		Report	Álvarez 31'; Fernández 57' (o.g.); Jordán 90+2'	Stadium: El Pozuelo; Referee: Isidro Díaz de Mera Escuderos

21 December 2022	Arnedo (4)	1–3	Osasuna (1)	Arnedo
21:00	Amelivia 65'	Report	Kike 13', 31'; R. García 14'	Stadium: Sendero; Referee: Mario Melero López

21 December 2022	Coria (4)	0–5	Real Sociedad (1)	Coria
21:00		Report	Navarro 5'; Cho 17'; Méndez 45+1' (pen.); Karrikaburu 79', 84'	Stadium: La Isla; Referee: Alejandro Muñiz Ruiz

21 December 2022	UD Logroñés (3)	0–0 (a.e.t.) (4–3 p)	Albacete (2)	Logroño
21:00	Boniquet (penalty scored); Sáenz (penalty scored); Thior (penalty missed); Keita (penalty scored); Menudo (penalty scored)	Report	(penalty scored) Higinio; (penalty scored) Juanma; (penalty missed) Fuster; (penalty missed) Riki; (penalty scored) Mesa	Stadium: Las Gaunas; Referee: David Gálvez Rascón

21 December 2022	Ceuta (3)	3–2	Ibiza (2)	Ceuta
21:00	González 14', 48'; Rodri 21'	Report	Lafarge 5' (o.g.); Ekain 49'	Stadium: Alfonso Murube; Referee: Luis Mario Milla Alvendiz

21 December 2022	Pontevedra (3)	2–1	Tenerife (2)	Pontevedra
21:00	Guèye 2', 16'	Report	Romero 63'	Stadium: Pasarón; Referee: Aitor Gorostegui Fernández-Ortega

22 December 2022	Gernika (4)	0–3	Celta Vigo (1)	Gernika
19:00		Report	Pérez 31'; Aidoo 55'; De la Torre 68'	Stadium: Urbieta; Referee: Miguel Ángel Ortiz Arias

22 December 2022	Cacereño (4)	2–1	Girona (1)	Cáceres
19:00	Grande 17'; Fernández 61'	Report	Castellanos 30'	Stadium: Príncipe Felipe; Referee: Javier Alberola Rojas

22 December 2022	Linares (3)	1–0	Racing Santander (2)	Linares
19:00	Corral 90+2'	Report		Stadium: Linarejos; Referee: Álvaro Moreno Aragón

22 December 2022	Eldense (3)	1–0	Burgos (2)	Elda
19:00	Córdoba 44' (o.g.)	Report		Stadium: Pepico Amat; Referee: Mateo Busquets Ferrer

22 December 2022	Arenteiro (4)	1–3	Atlético Madrid (1)	O Carballiño
21:00	Marquitos 42'	Report	Carrasco 45+1' (pen.), 90+1'; Barrios 76'	Stadium: Espiñedo; Referee: Pablo González Fuertes

22 December 2022	Gimnàstic (3)	2–1	Málaga (2)	Tarragona
21:00	Domingo 13'; P. Fernández 81'	Report	N'Diaye 32'	Stadium: Nou Estadi; Referee: Iván Caparrós Hernández

22 December 2022	La Nucía (3)	0–0 (a.e.t.) (6–5 p)	Las Palmas (2)	La Nucía
21:00		Report		Stadium: Camilo Cano; Attendance: 1,200; Referee: Rafael Sánchez López
	Penalties
	Calvo (penalty scored); Delgado (penalty scored); Pina (penalty scored); J. García (penalty scored); Dasquet (penalty scored); León (penalty scored)		(penalty scored) Cardona; (penalty scored) Lemos; (penalty scored) Pejiño; (penalty scored) Loiodice; (penalty scored) Moleiro; (penalty missed) F. González

22 December 2022	Oviedo (2)	1–0	Granada (2)	Oviedo
21:00	Luengo 8'	Report		Stadium: Carlos Tartiere; Referee: Francisco José Hernández Maeso

== Final phase ==
=== Bracket ===
Round of 32
Cartagena	1
Villarreal	5
Cacereño	0
Real Madrid	1
Levante	3
Getafe	2
Oviedo	0
Atlético Madrid	2
Ceuta	1
Elche	0
Intercity	3
Barcelona (a.e.t.)	4
UD Logroñés	0
Real Sociedad	1
Pontevedra	0
Mallorca (a.e.t.)	2
Ibiza Islas Pitiusas	1
Real Betis	4
Gimnàstic	1
Osasuna (a.e.t.)	2
Alavés	1
Valladolid	0
Linares	0
Sevilla	5
Sporting Gijón	2
Rayo Vallecano	0
La Nucía	0
Valencia	3
Eldense	1
Athletic Bilbao	6
Espanyol (a.e.t.)	3
Celta Vigo	1

Round of 16
Villarreal	2
Real Madrid	3
Levante	0
Atlético Madrid	2
Ceuta	0
Barcelona	5
Real Sociedad	1
Mallorca	0
Real Betis	2 (2)
Osasuna (p)	2 (4)
Alavés	0
Sevilla	1
Sporting Gijón	0
Valencia	4
Athletic Bilbao	1
Espanyol	0

Quarter-finals
Real Madrid (a.e.t.)	3
Atlético Madrid	1
Barcelona	1
Real Sociedad	0
Osasuna (a.e.t.)	2
Sevilla	1
Valencia	1
Athletic Bilbao	3

Semi-finals
Real Madrid	0	4	4
Barcelona	1	0	1
Osasuna (a.e.t.)	1	1	2
Athletic Bilbao	1	0	1

Final
Real Madrid	2
Osasuna	1

== Round of 32 ==
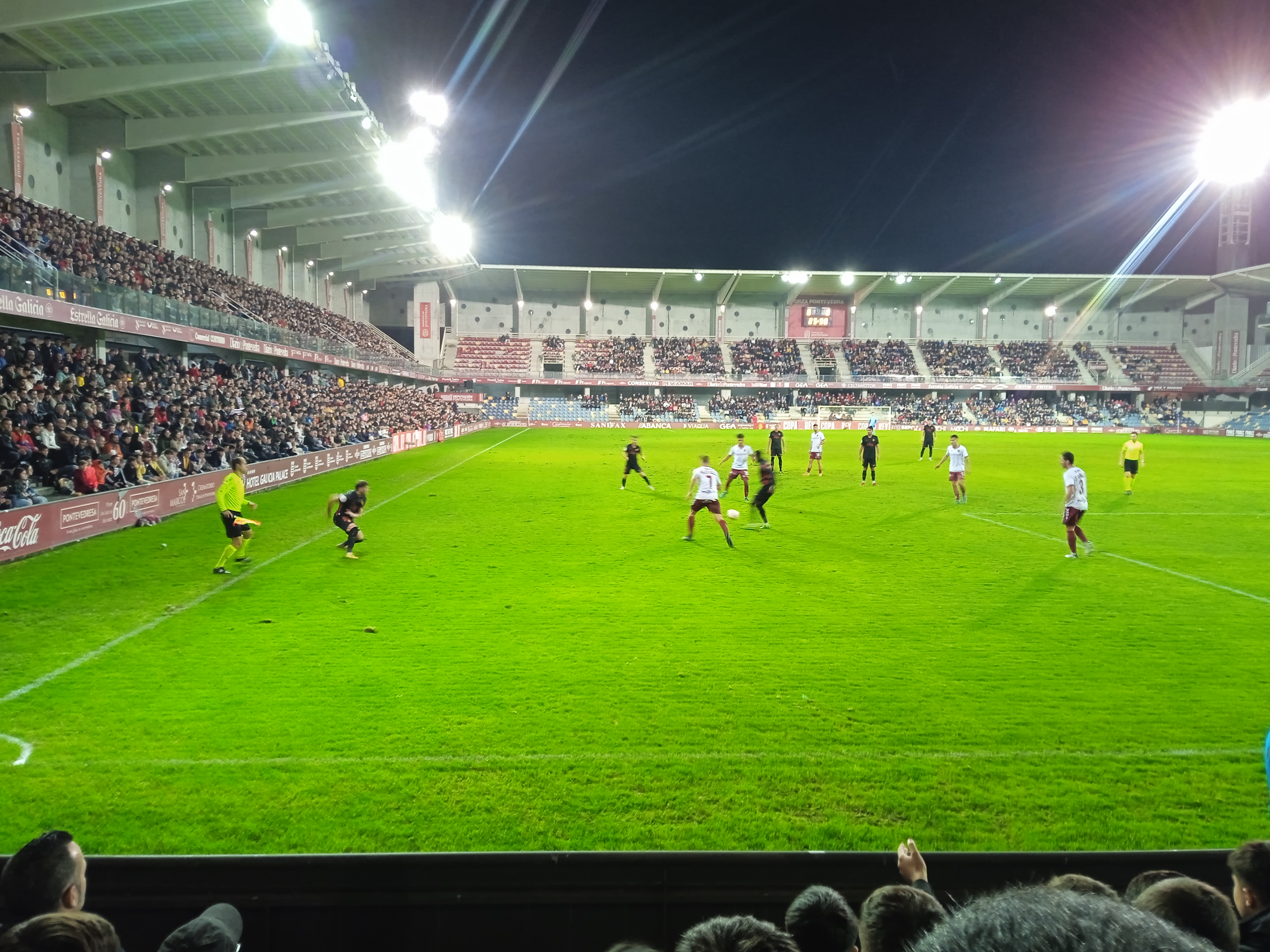
Pontevedra CF – RCD Mallorca.

=== Draw ===
The draw was held on 23 December 2022 in the RFEF headquarters in Las Rozas. The four participant teams of the 2023 Supercopa de España were drawn with the teams from the lowest category. The remaining teams from the lowest categories faced the rest of La Liga teams. Matches were played at stadiums of lower-ranked teams. A total of 16 games were played from 3 to 5 January 2023.

Pot 1; 4 participants in 2023 Supercopa de España	Pot 2; 13 teams of La Liga	Pot 3; 5 teams of Segunda División	Pot 4; 8 teams of Primera RFEF	Pot 5; 2 teams of Segunda RFEF
Barcelona; Real Betis; Real Madrid; Valencia	Athletic Bilbao; Atlético Madrid; Celta Vigo; Elche; Espanyol; Getafe; Mallorca; Osasuna; Rayo Vallecano; Real Sociedad; Sevilla; Valladolid; Villarreal	Alavés; Cartagena; Levante; Oviedo; Sporting Gijón	Ceuta; Eldense; Gimnàstic; Intercity; La Nucía; Linares; Pontevedra; UD Logroñés	Cacereño; Ibiza Islas Pitiusas

=== Matches ===
3 January 2023	Espanyol (1)	3–1 (a.e.t.)	Celta Vigo (1)	Cornellà de Llobregat
19:00	Puado 53'; Darder 97'; Melamed 118'	Report	Paciência 15'	Stadium: RCDE Stadium; Attendance: 20,050; Referee: Juan Martínez Munuera

3 January 2023	La Nucía (3)	0–3	Valencia (1)	La Nucía
19:00		Report	Kluivert 3'; Moriba 31'; Duro 72'	Stadium: Camilo Cano; Attendance: 7,000; Referee: Mario Melero López

3 January 2023	Cartagena (2)	1–5	Villarreal (1)	Cartagena
19:00	Vázquez 39'	Report	Baena 49'; Danjuma 56'; Morales 60'; Chukwueze 85'; Capoue 90'	Stadium: Cartagonova; Attendance: 14,800; Referee: Alejandro Hernández Hernández

3 January 2023	Cacereño (4)	0–1	Real Madrid (1)	Cáceres
21:00		Report	Rodrygo 69'	Stadium: Príncipe Felipe; Attendance: 15,000; Referee: Guillermo Cuadra Fernández

3 January 2023	Ceuta (3)	1–0	Elche (1)	Ceuta
21:00	Rodri 44' (pen.)	Report		Stadium: Alfonso Murube; Attendance: 2,483; Referee: Jorge Figueroa Vázquez

3 January 2023	Sporting Gijón (2)	2–0	Rayo Vallecano (1)	Gijón
21:00	Milovanović 57', 88'	Report		Stadium: El Molinón-Enrique Castro "Quini"; Attendance: 17,423; Referee: Juan Luis Pulido Santana

3 January 2023	Levante (2)	3–2	Getafe (1)	Valencia
21:00	Postigo 52'; Muñoz 62'; Wesley 90+1'	Report	Munir 34', 56'	Stadium: Ciutat de València; Attendance: 11,403; Referee: José María Sánchez Martínez

4 January 2023	Linares (3)	0–5	Sevilla (1)	Linares
19:00		Report	En-Nesyri 37', 40', 74'; Squadrone 57' (o.g.); Lamela 69'	Stadium: Linarejos; Attendance: 9,500; Referee: Antonio Mateu Lahoz

4 January 2023	UD Logroñés (3)	0–1	Real Sociedad (1)	Logroño
19:00		Report	Navarro 33'	Stadium: Las Gaunas; Attendance: 15,000; Referee: Pablo González Fuertes

4 January 2023	Pontevedra (3)	0–2 (a.e.t.)	Mallorca (1)	Pontevedra
19:00		Report	Abdón 97'; Muriqi 104'	Stadium: Pasarón; Attendance: 10,500; Referee: Carlos del Cerro Grande

4 January 2023	Oviedo (2)	0–2	Atlético Madrid (1)	Oviedo
20:00		Report	Llorente 24'; Barrios 83'	Stadium: Carlos Tartiere; Attendance: 27,303; Referee: Alejandro Muñiz Ruiz

4 January 2023	Intercity (3)	3–4 (a.e.t.)	Barcelona (1)	Alicante
21:00	Soldevila 59', 74', 86'	Report	Araújo 4'; Dembélé 66'; Raphinha 77'; Fati 103'	Stadium: José Rico Pérez (Note: Intercity did not play the match in their main stadium Antonio Solana, Alicante, as it did not meet the broadcasting requirements.); Attendance: 26,000; Referee: Valentín Pizarro Gómez

4 January 2023	Alavés (2)	1–0	Valladolid (1)	Vitoria-Gasteiz
21:00	Sylla 11'	Report		Stadium: Mendizorrotza; Attendance: 8,800; Referee: Miguel Ángel Ortiz Arias

5 January 2023	Ibiza Islas Pitiusas (4)	1–4	Real Betis (1)	Ibiza
16:00	Bernal 26'	Report	Willian José 54'; González 58'; Murua 81' (o.g.); Fekir 90+3'	Stadium: Can Misses 3 Attendance: 1,170; Referee: Javier Iglesias Villanueva

5 January 2023	Gimnàstic (3)	1–2 (a.e.t.)	Osasuna (1)	Tarragona
16:00	P. Fernández 78'	Report	Kike 16'; Montes 112' (o.g.)	Stadium: Nou Estadi; Attendance: 8,282; Referee: Isidro Díaz de Mera Escuderos

5 January 2023	Eldense (3)	1–6	Athletic Bilbao (1)	Elda
21:00	Soberón 67'	Report	N. Williams 35'; Berenguer 41', 65'; Zarraga 59'; Correia 74' (o.g.); Muniain 90'	Stadium: Nuevo Pepico Amat; Attendance: 5,700; Referee: Javier Alberola Rojas

== Round of 16 ==
=== Draw ===
The draw was held on 7 January 2023 in the RFEF headquarters in Las Rozas. The qualified teams were split up into three groups based on their division in the 2022–23 season. When possible, matches were played at the stadiums of the lower-ranked teams, otherwise the first team drawn played at home. A total of eight games were played from 17 to 19 January 2023.

Pot 1; 12 teams of La Liga	Pot 2; 3 teams of Segunda División	Pot 3; 1 team of Primera RFEF
Athletic Bilbao; Atlético Madrid; Barcelona; Espanyol; Mallorca; Osasuna; Real Betis; Real Madrid; Real Sociedad; Sevilla; Valencia; Villarreal	Alavés; Levante; Sporting Gijón	Ceuta

=== Matches ===
17 January 2023	Real Sociedad (1)	1–0	Mallorca (1)	San Sebastián
19:00	Navarro 5'	Report		Stadium: Anoeta; Attendance: 23,408; Referee: Alejandro Hernández Hernández

17 January 2023	Alavés (2)	0–1	Sevilla (1)	Vitoria-Gasteiz
21:00		Report	Rakitić 48'	Stadium: Mendizorrotza; Attendance: 12,217; Referee: César Soto Grado

18 January 2023	Sporting Gijón (2)	0–4	Valencia (1)	Gijón
19:00		Report	Cavani 10', 39'; Kluivert 21'; Lino 64'	Stadium: El Molinón-Enrique Castro "Quini"; Attendance: 14,625; Referee: José Luis Munuera Montero

18 January 2023	Athletic Bilbao (1)	1–0	Espanyol (1)	Bilbao
20:00	De Marcos 27'	Report		Stadium: San Mamés; Attendance: 37,564; Referee: Juan Luis Pulido Santana

18 January 2023	Real Betis (1)	2–2 (a.e.t.) (2–4 p)	Osasuna (1)	Seville
21:00	Carvalho 62'; Sabaly 103'	Report	D. García 90+1'; R. García 106'	Stadium: Benito Villamarín; Attendance: 35,817; Referee: Javier Alberola Rojas
	Penalties
	Iglesias (penalty scored); Loren (penalty scored); Canales (penalty missed); Rodríguez (penalty missed)		(penalty scored) Ávila; (penalty scored) Budimir; (penalty scored) Moncayola; (penalty scored) Barja

18 January 2023	Levante (2)	0–2	Atlético Madrid (1)	Valencia
21:00		Report	Morata 54'; Llorente 90+1'	Stadium: Ciutat de València; Attendance: 18,000; Referee: Jorge Figueroa Vázquez

19 January 2023	Ceuta (3)	0–5	Barcelona (1)	Ceuta
20:00		Report	Raphinha 41'; Lewandowski 50', 90'; Fati 70'; Kessié 77'	Stadium: Alfonso Murube; Attendance: 7,000; Referee: Juan Martínez Munuera

19 January 2023	Villarreal (1)	2–3	Real Madrid (1)	Villarreal
21:00	Capoue 4'; Chukwueze 42'	Report	Vinícius 57'; Militão 69'; Ceballos 86'	Stadium: Estadio de la Cerámica; Attendance: 20,124; Referee: Jesús Gil Manzano

== Quarter-finals ==
=== Draw ===
The draw was held on 20 January 2023 in the RFEF headquarters in Las Rozas. As there were no teams from the lower divisions, home teams were determined by luck of the draw.

Qualified teams
8 teams of La Liga

Athletic Bilbao
Atlético Madrid
Barcelona
Osasuna
Real Madrid
Real Sociedad
Sevilla
Valencia

=== Matches ===
25 January 2023	Barcelona (1)	1–0	Real Sociedad (1)	Barcelona
21:00	Dembélé 52'	Report		Stadium: Camp Nou; Attendance: 59,610; Referee: Jesús Gil Manzano

25 January 2023	Osasuna (1)	2–1 (a.e.t.)	Sevilla (1)	Pamplona
22:00	Ávila 71'; Ezzalzouli 99'	Report	En-Nesyri 90+4'	Stadium: El Sadar; Attendance: 19,724; Referee: Ricardo de Burgos Bengoetxea

26 January 2023	Valencia (1)	1–3	Athletic Bilbao (1)	Valencia
20:00	De Marcos 43' (o.g.)	Report	Muniain 35'; N. Williams 45'; Vesga 74' (pen.)	Stadium: Mestalla; Attendance: 45,040; Referee: Carlos del Cerro Grande

26 January 2023	Real Madrid (1)	3–1 (a.e.t.)	Atlético Madrid (1)	Madrid
21:00	Rodrygo 79'; Benzema 104'; Vinícius 120+1'	Report	Morata 19'	Stadium: Santiago Bernabéu; Attendance: 68,000; Referee: César Soto Grado

== Semi-finals ==
=== Draw ===
The draw for the semi-finals was held on 30 January 2023 in the RFEF headquarters in Las Rozas.

Qualified teams
4 teams of La Liga

Athletic Bilbao
Barcelona
Osasuna
Real Madrid

=== Summary ===
Team 1	Agg.	Team 2	1st leg	2nd leg
Osasuna (1)	2–1	Athletic Bilbao (1)	1–0	1–1 (a.e.t.)
Real Madrid (1)	4–1	Barcelona (1)	0–1	4–0

=== Matches ===
1 March 2023
21:00 CET (UTC+1)

Osasuna	1–0	Athletic Bilbao
Ezzalzouli 47'	Report

El Sadar, Pamplona
Attendance: 23,026
Referee: Jesús Gil Manzano
4 April 2023
21:00 CEST (UTC+2)

Athletic Bilbao	1–1 (a.e.t.)	Osasuna
I. Williams 33'	Report	Ibáñez 116'

San Mamés, Bilbao
Attendance: 51,544
Referee: Carlos del Cerro Grande

Osasuna won 2–1 on aggregate.

2 March 2023
21:00 CET (UTC+1)

Real Madrid	0–1	Barcelona
	Report	Militão 26' (o.g.)

Santiago Bernabéu, Madrid
Attendance: 60,000
Referee: José Luis Munuera Montero
5 April 2023
21:00 CEST (UTC+2)

Barcelona	0–4	Real Madrid
	Report	Vinícius 45+1'; Benzema 50', 58' (pen.), 80'

Camp Nou, Barcelona
Attendance: 94,902
Referee: Juan Martínez Munuera

Real Madrid won 4–1 on aggregate.

== Final ==
6 May 2023
22:00 CEST

Real Madrid	2–1	Osasuna
Rodrygo 2', 70'	Report	Torró 58'

La Cartuja, Seville
Attendance: 55,579
Referee: José María Sánchez Martínez (Murcia)

== Top scorers ==
Rank	Player	Club	Goals
1	(Spain) Kike	Osasuna	5
2	(France) Karim Benzema	Real Madrid	4
2	(Nigeria) Samuel Chukwueze	Villarreal	4
2	(Morocco) Youssef En-Nesyri	Sevilla	4
2	(Serbia) Uroš Milovanović	Sporting Gijón	4
2	(Morocco) Munir	Getafe	4
2	(Spain) Robert Navarro	Real Sociedad	4
2	(Brazil) Rodrygo	Real Madrid	4
2	(Spain) Oriol Soldevila	Intercity	4
10	(Spain) Abdón	Mallorca	3
10	(Spain) Álex Berenguer	Athletic Bilbao	3
10	(France) Étienne Capoue	Villarreal	3
10	(Spain) Gerard Moreno	Villarreal	3
10	(Spain) Rodri	Ceuta	3
10	(Brazil) Vinícius Júnior	Real Madrid	3
10	(Spain) Nico Williams	Athletic Bilbao	3
