= 2024 Copa Federación de España =

Tournament details
- Country: Spain
- Teams: 32 (in national phase)

Final positions
- Champions: Extremadura
- Runners-up: Compostela

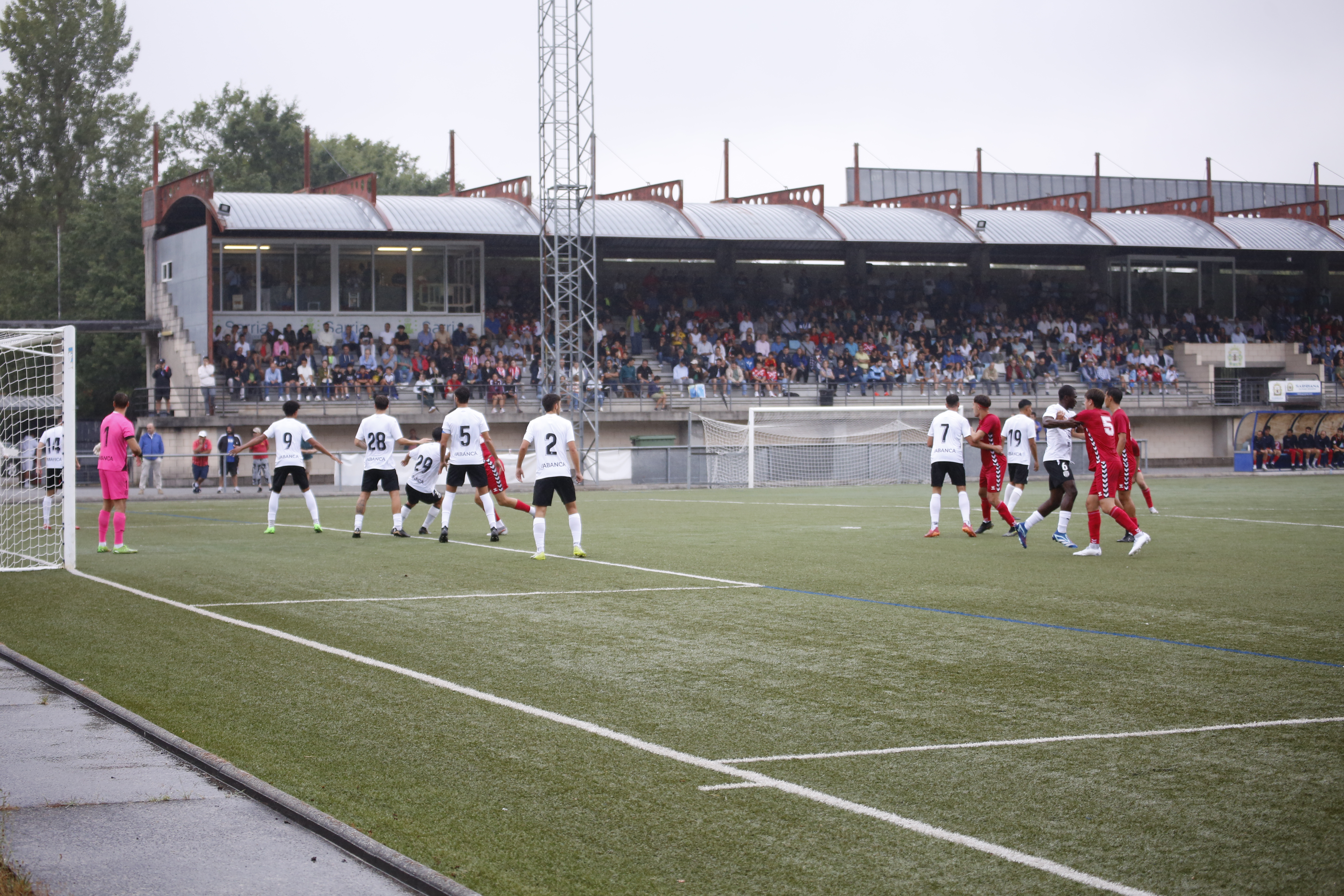
SD Sarriana - CD Lugo.

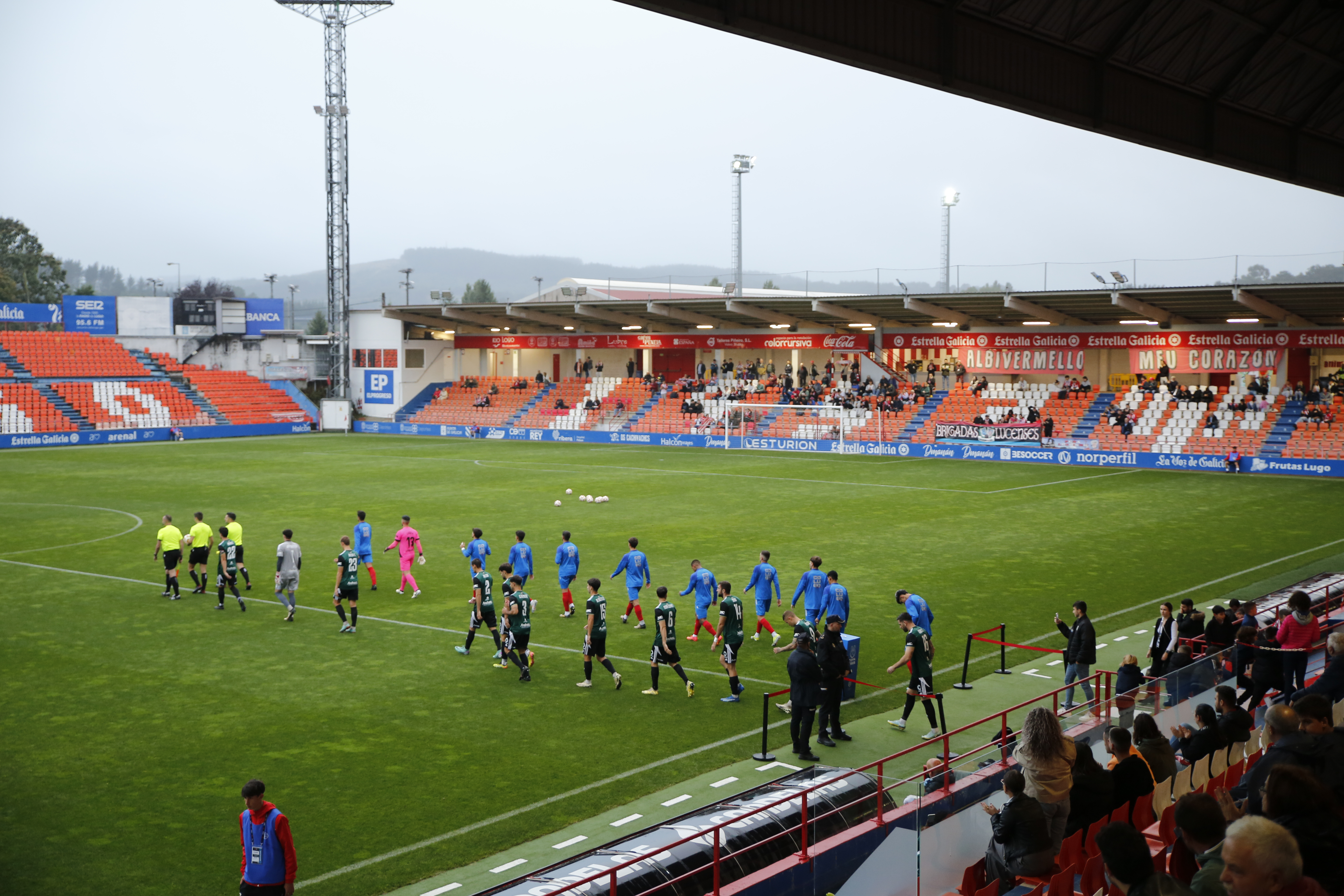
CD Lugo - Sestao River Club.

The 2024 Copa Federación de España was the 32nd edition of the Copa Federación de España, also known as Copa RFEF, a knockout competition for Spanish football clubs.

The competition began in August with the first games of the Regional stages and ended on 13 November with the final of the National tournament. As part of the new competition format started in 2019, the four semifinalists will qualified for the Copa del Rey first round.

== Regional tournaments ==
=== Andalusia tournament ===
The Royal Andalusian Football Federation (RFAF) decided to create the 'Copa RFAF' in 2020. The finalists of this competition will be selected as the Andalusian representatives in the national phase of Copa RFEF.

Quarter-finals
18 and 21 August
At. Mancha Real (5) | 0 | 2 | 2
Motril (5) | 1 | 0 | 1
18 and 21 August
Poli. Almería (5) | 0 | 0 | 0
Arenas (5) | 2 | 6 | 8
18 and 21 August
Inter Sevilla (5) | 1 | 3 | 4
Puente Genil (5) | 1 | 0 | 1
18 and 21 August
Utrera (5) | 2 | 0 | 2
Pozoblanco (5) | 2 | 1 | 3

Semi-finals
25 and 28 August
At. Mancha Real (5) (6–5 p) | 2 | 2 | 4
Arenas (5) | 1 | 3 | 4
25 and 28 August
Inter Sevilla (5) | 1 | 0 | 1
Pozoblanco (5) (4–1 p) | 1 | 0 | 1

Final
1 and 4 September
At. Mancha Real (5) | 0 | 2 | 2
Pozoblanco (5) | 2 | 4 | 6

==== Final ====
| 1 September | At. Mancha Real (5) | 0–2 | Pozoblanco (5) | Mancha Real |
| 20:00 | | Report | Miguel Ángel Alcaide 'Zara' 13'; Manuel León 58' | Stadium: La Juventud; Referee: Rodríguez Marín |

| 4 September | Pozoblanco (5) | 4–2 | At. Mancha Real (5) | Pozoblanco |
| 21:00 | David García 30'; José Carlos Calero 33'; Kilian Durán 66'; Miguel Ángel Alcaide 'Zara' 73' | Report | José Carlos Padilla 60', 70' | Stadium: Municipal; Referee: Fernández Martínez |

=== Aragon tournament ===
Four teams joined the tournament: Brea (5), Caspe (5), Calamocha (5) and Utrillas (5).

| Pos | Team | Pld | W | D | L | GF | GA | GD | Pts | Qualification | CAS | CAL | BRE | UTR |
|---|---|---|---|---|---|---|---|---|---|---|---|---|---|---|
| 1 | Caspe | 3 | 2 | 1 | 0 | 4 | 1 | +3 | 7 | Qual. to National Phase | — | — | — | 2–0 |
| 2 | Calamocha | 3 | 1 | 1 | 1 | 3 | 3 | 0 | 4 | | 1–2 | — | 0–0 | — |
| 3 | Brea | 3 | 0 | 3 | 0 | 2 | 2 | 0 | 3 | | 0–0 | — | — | 2–2 |
| 4 | Utrillas | 3 | 0 | 1 | 2 | 3 | 6 | −3 | 1 | | — | 1–2 | — | — |

Updated to match(es) played on 31 August. Source: Federación Aragonesa de Fútbol

=== Asturias tournament ===
12 teams joined the tournament. The draw was made on 5 July and the tournament started on 4 August.

| Pot 1 | Pot 2 | Pot 3 |
|---|---|---|
| Marino Luanco^{TH} (4); Avilés Industrial (4); Covadonga (5); Ceares (5) | L'Entregu (5); Praviano (5); Tuilla (5); Urraca (5) | Caudal (5); Colunga (5); Lenense (5); Avilés Stadium (5) |

==== Group stage ====
===== Group A =====
| Pos | Team | Pld | W | D | L | GF | GA | GD | Pts | Qualification | CAU | COV | URR |
|---|---|---|---|---|---|---|---|---|---|---|---|---|---|
| 1 | Caudal | 4 | 2 | 1 | 1 | 5 | 3 | +2 | 7 | Qualification to semifinals | — | 0–0 | 3–0 |
| 2 | Covadonga | 4 | 1 | 3 | 0 | 3 | 1 | +2 | 6 | | 2–0 | — | 1–1 |
| 3 | Urraca | 4 | 0 | 2 | 2 | 2 | 6 | −4 | 2 | | 1–2 | 0–0 | — |

Updated to match(es) played on 21 August. Source: Fútbol Asturiano

===== Group B =====
| Pos | Team | Pld | W | D | L | GF | GA | GD | Pts | Qualification | CEA | ENT | AVI |
|---|---|---|---|---|---|---|---|---|---|---|---|---|---|
| 1 | Ceares | 4 | 2 | 1 | 1 | 6 | 3 | +3 | 7 | Qualification to semifinals | — | 1–1 | 4–1 |
| 2 | L'Entregu | 4 | 1 | 2 | 1 | 3 | 3 | 0 | 5 | | 1–0 | — | 0–0 |
| 3 | Avilés Stadium | 4 | 1 | 1 | 2 | 3 | 6 | −3 | 4 | | 0–1 | 2–1 | — |

Updated to match(es) played on 21 August. Source: Fútbol Asturiano

===== Group C =====
| Pos | Team | Pld | W | D | L | GF | GA | GD | Pts | Qualification | AVL | PRA | LEN |
|---|---|---|---|---|---|---|---|---|---|---|---|---|---|
| 1 | Avilés Industrial | 4 | 3 | 1 | 0 | 10 | 2 | +8 | 10 | Qualification to semifinals | — | 4–0 | 3–1 |
| 2 | Praviano | 4 | 1 | 1 | 2 | 2 | 7 | −5 | 4 | | 0–2 | — | 1–0 |
| 3 | Lenense | 4 | 0 | 2 | 2 | 3 | 6 | −3 | 2 | | 1–1 | 1–1 | — |

Updated to match(es) played on 21 August. Source: Fútbol Asturiano

===== Group D =====
| Pos | Team | Pld | W | D | L | GF | GA | GD | Pts | Qualification | MAR | TUI | COL |
|---|---|---|---|---|---|---|---|---|---|---|---|---|---|
| 1 | Marino Luanco | 4 | 4 | 0 | 0 | 19 | 3 | +16 | 12 | Qualification to semifinals | — | 6–0 | 8–1 |
| 2 | Tuilla | 4 | 1 | 1 | 2 | 4 | 9 | −5 | 4 | | 1–2 | — | 3–1 |
| 3 | Colunga | 4 | 0 | 1 | 3 | 3 | 14 | −11 | 1 | | 1–3 | 0–0 | — |

Updated to match(es) played on 21 August. Source: Fútbol Asturiano

==== Knockout stage ====
The knockout stage matches will be played at Román Suárez Puerta Stadium, in Avilés.

Semi-finals
24 August – Avilés
Caudal (5) | 2
Ceares (5) | 0
25 August – Avilés
Avilés Industrial (4) | 5
Marino Luanco (4) | 1

Final
4 September – Avilés
Caudal (5) | 0 (4)
Avilés Industrial (4) | 0 (5)

==== Final ====
| 4 September | Caudal (5) | 0–0 (4–5 p) | Avilés Industrial (4) | Avilés |
| 20:00 | | Report | | Stadium: Román Suárez Puerta; Attendance: 2.000; Referee: Gao Aladro |

=== Balearic Islands tournament ===
Five teams joined the tournament.

Quarter-finals
16 August
Penya Independent (5) | 1
Formentera (5) | 0

Semi-finals
7 August
Manacor (5) | 1
Platges de Calvià (5) | 0
18 August
Penya Independent (5) (p) | 1 (7)
Peña Deportiva (4) | 1 (6)

Final
25 August
Manacor (5) (p) | 1 (3)
Penya Independent (5) | 1 (1)

==== Final ====
| 25 August | Manacor (5) | 1–1 (3–1 p) | Penya Independent (5) | Manacor |
| 12:45 | Marcos Arriaza 45' | Report | Freiner Omar Durán 4' | Stadium: Na Capellera; Referee: Murillo Yustos |

=== Basque Country tournament ===
5 teams joined the tournament: Arenas (4), Derio (5), Gernika (4), Santurtzi (5) and Sestao River (3). The draw was made 11 July.

Quarter-finals
14 August
Derio (5) | 2
Arenas (4) (a.e.t.) | 3

Semi-finals
28 August
Arenas (4) | 0
Sestao River (3) | 1
21 August
Santurtzi (5) | 1
Gernika (4) | 2

Final
11 September
Sestao River (3) | 1
Gernika (4) | 0

==== Final ====
| 11 September | Sestao River (3) | 1–0 | Gernika (4) | Sestao |
| 19:30 | Carlos Cordero 81' | Report | | Stadium: Las Llanas; Attendance: 1.475; Referee: Etayo Herrera |

=== Canary Islands tournament ===
Only Mensajero (5) joined the tournament.

=== Cantabria tournament ===
Eight teams joined the tournament: At. Albericia (5), Bezana (5), Castro (5), Cayón (5), Gimnástica Torrelavega (4), Torina (5), Tropezón (5) and Vimenor (5).

Quarter-finals
14 August
Gim. Torrelavega (4) | 2
Castro (5) | 0
15 August
At. Albericia (5) | 0
Vimenor (5) | 2
15 August
Cayón (5) (p) | 0 (4)
Bezana (5) | 0 (3)
15 August
Torina (5) | 1
Tropezón (5) | 0

Semi-finals
18 August - Bezana
Gim. Torrelavega (4) | 0
Vimenor (5) | 1
18 August - Bezana
Cayón (5) | 2
Torina (5) | 0

Final
24 August - Bezana
Vimenor (5) (a.e.t.) (p) | 0 (3)
Cayón (5) | 0 (2)

==== Final ====
| 24 August | Vimenor (5) | 0–0 (a.e.t.) (3–2 p) | Cayón (5) | Bezana |
| 18:30 | | Report | | Stadium: Municipal; Referee: Salazar Castaño |

=== Castile and León tournament ===
3 teams joined the tournament: Palencia (5), Santa Marta (5) and Villaralbo (5). The draw was made 17 July and the tournament started 10 August.

| Pos | Team | Pld | W | D | L | GF | GA | GD | Pts | Qualification | STM | PAL | VIL |
|---|---|---|---|---|---|---|---|---|---|---|---|---|---|
| 1 | Santa Marta | 2 | 2 | 0 | 0 | 6 | 4 | +2 | 6 | Qualification to National tournament | — | — | 3–2 |
| 2 | Palencia | 2 | 1 | 0 | 1 | 4 | 3 | +1 | 3 | | 2–3 | — | — |
| 3 | Villaralbo | 2 | 0 | 0 | 2 | 2 | 5 | −3 | 0 | | — | 0–2 | — |

Updated to match(es) played on 24 August. Source: Real Federación de Castilla y León de Fútbol

=== Castile-La Mancha tournament ===
Twelve teams joined the Trofeo Junta de Comunidades de Castilla-La Mancha acting as qualifying tournament. Cazalegas and Conquense cannot qualify because they are already qualified to Copa del Rey or National Phase of Copa RFEF.

First round
10 August
Manchego (5) | 0
Calvo Sotelo (5) | 1
10 August
Cazalegas (5) | 0
Toledo (5) | 2
11 August
Villarrubia (5) (p) | 1 (5)
Tarancón (5) | 1 (4)
6 August
Socuéllamos (5) | 1
Quintanar del Rey (5) | 2

Quarter-finals
15 August
Calvo Sotelo (5) | 2
Illescas (4) | 0
15 August
Toledo (5) | 0
Talavera (4) | 1
15 August
Villarrubia (5) | 1
Guadalajara (4) | 2
13 August
Quintanar del Rey (5) | 0
Conquense (4) | 2

Semi-finals
18 August
Calvo Sotelo (5) (p) | 3 (5)
Talavera (4) | 3 (4)
18 August
Guadalajara (4) | 2
Conquense (4) | 1

Final
25 August
Calvo Sotelo (5) (p) | 1 (4)
Guadalajara (4) | 1 (3)

==== Final ====
| 25 August | Calvo Sotelo (5) | 1–1 (4–3 p) | Guadalajara (4) | Puertollano |
| 21:00 | Javier Sahuquillo 50' | Report | Miguel García Cera 90+6' | Stadium: Estadio Municipal Sánchez Menor; Referee: Castell Orozco |

=== Catalonia tournament ===
Seven teams joined the tournament. The draw was made 26 July.

Quarter-finals
10 August
Badalona (5) | 3
UE Tona (5) | 0
10 August
Prat (5) | 1
Manresa (5) | 2
10 August
Reus FCR (5) | 1 (2)
Cornellà (4) (p) | 1 (4)

Semi-finals
18 August
Badalona (5) | 2 (3)
Sabadell (4) (p) | 2 (5)
17 August
Manresa (5) | 1 (4)
Cornellà (4) (p) | 1 (5)

Final
25 August
Sabadell (4) | 1
Cornellà (4) | 0

==== Final ====
| 25 August | Sabadell (4) | 1–0 | Cornellà (4) | Sabadell |
| 19:30 | Sergio Cortés 90+4' | Report | | Stadium: Nova Creu Alta; Attendance: 2.300; Referee: Montava Baqué |

=== Ceuta tournament ===
Princípe Alfonso (6) was directly selected by Federación de Fútbol de Ceuta due to sporting merits.

=== Extremadura tournament ===
10 teams joined the tournament. Draw was made 12 July.

First round
11 August
Jaraíz (5) | 1 (3)
Moralo (5) (p) | 1 (4)
11 August
Atlético Pueblonuevo (5) | 2
Montijo (5) | 0

Quarter-finals
18 August
Azuaga (5) | 1 (5)
Castuera (5) (p) | 1 (6)
18 August
Moralo (5) | 0 (4)
Santa Amalia (5) (p) | 0 (5)
18 August
Jerez (5) | 0
Olivenza (5) | 1
17 August
Extremadura (5) | 3
Atlético Pueblonuevo (5) | 0

Semi-finals
24 August
Castuera (5) | 3
Santa Amalia (5) | 0
24 August
Olivenza (5) | 0
Extremadura (5) | 2

Final
31 August - Miajadas
Castuera (5) | 1
Extremadura (5) | 2

==== Final ====
| 31 August | Castuera (5) | 1–2 | Extremadura (5) | Miajadas |
| 20:00 | Jorge González 90+3' | Report | Pablo Platero 81'; Rubén Cabeza 87' | Stadium: Municipal; Attendance: 1.200; Referee: Agraz Díaz |

=== Galicia tournament ===
14 teams joined the tournament. The draw was made 19 July.

First Round
4 August
Sarriana (5) (p) | 1 (4)
Betanzos (5) | 1 (2)
31 July
Atlético Arteixo (5) | 1 (2)
Silva (5) (p) | 1 (4)
3 August
Viveiro (5) (p) | 0 (5)
Racing Villalbés (5) | 0 (4)
2 August
Estradense (5) | 0
Barbadás (5) | 1
3 August
Arosa (5) | 2
Alondras (5) | 1
4 August
Gran Peña (5) | 0
Coruxo (4) | 1

Quarter-finals
10 August
Sarriana (5) | 1
Silva (5) | 0
6 August
Viveiro (5) | 0
Lugo (3) | 1
10 August
Barbadás (5) (p) | 0 (5)
Arenteiro (3) | 0 (4)
10 August
Arosa (5) | 0
Coruxo (4) | 2

Semi-finals
13 August
Sarriana (5) | 0
Lugo (3) | 4
15 August
Barbadás (5) | 1 (3)
Coruxo (4) (p) | 1 (4)

Final
18 August - Monforte de Lemos
Lugo (3) | 1
Coruxo (4) | 0

==== Final ====
| 18 August | Lugo (3) | 1–0 | Coruxo (4) | Monforte de Lemos |
| 19:30 | Jon Cabo 17' | Report | | Stadium: A Pinguela; Attendance: 500; Referee: Estévez Blanco |

=== La Rioja tournament ===
Four teams joined the tournament. The draw was made 24 July.

Semi-finals
18 August
Haro (5) | 2
La Calzada (5) | 1
18 August
Varea (5) | 1
Oyonesa (5) | 0

Final
24 August - Logroño
Haro (5) | 2
Varea (5) | 4

==== Final ====
| 24 August | Haro (5) | 2–4 | Varea (5) | Logroño |
| 18:30 | Aitor Zunzunegui 23', 28' | Report | Asier Barahona 19'; Marc Gulias 85', 89'; Julio Rico 87' | Stadium: Mundial 82; Referee: Oyón Hidalgo |

=== Madrid tournament ===
7 teams joined the tournament: Canillas (5), Fuenlabrada (3), Las Rozas (5), Navalcarnero (5), Torrejón (5), Tres Cantos (5) and Ursaria (4). The draw was made 11 July and tournament started 14 August. Ursaria withdrew after the draw.

==== Group A ====
| Pos | Team | Pld | W | D | L | GF | GA | GD | Pts | Qualification | ROZ | CAN | TRC | URS |
|---|---|---|---|---|---|---|---|---|---|---|---|---|---|---|
| 1 | Las Rozas | 2 | 2 | 0 | 0 | 2 | 0 | +2 | 6 | Qualification to the final | — | 1–0 | — | — |
| 2 | Canillas | 2 | 1 | 0 | 1 | 1 | 1 | 0 | 3 | | — | — | 1–0 | — |
| 3 | Tres Cantos | 2 | 0 | 0 | 2 | 0 | 2 | −2 | 0 | | 0–1 | — | — | — |
| 4 | Ursaria | 0 | 0 | 0 | 0 | 0 | 0 | 0 | 0 | | — | — | — | — |

Updated to match(es) played on 21 August. Source: Real Federación de Fútbol de Madrid

==== Group B ====
| Pos | Team | Pld | W | D | L | GF | GA | GD | Pts | Qualification | FUE | NAV | TOR |
|---|---|---|---|---|---|---|---|---|---|---|---|---|---|
| 1 | Fuenlabrada | 2 | 2 | 0 | 0 | 4 | 0 | +4 | 6 | Qualification to the final | — | – | 3–0 |
| 2 | Navalcarnero | 2 | 1 | 0 | 1 | 1 | 1 | 0 | 3 | | 0–1 | — | – |
| 3 | Torrejón | 2 | 0 | 0 | 2 | 0 | 4 | −4 | 0 | | – | 0–1 | — |

Updated to match(es) played on 21 August. Source: Real Federación de Fútbol de Madrid

==== Final ====
| 28 August | Las Rozas (5) | 2–1 | Fuenlabrada (3) | Madrid |
| 20:00 | Roberto Sánchez 10'; Joselu Cano 50' | Report | Ilies Hassaine 25' | Stadium: Ernesto Cotorruelo; Referee: Alonso Campos |

=== Melilla tournament ===
UD Melilla (4) was directly selected by Federación de Fútbol de Melilla due to sporting merits.

=== Murcia tournament ===
Four teams joined the tournament.

Semi-finals
28 August
Caravaca (5)
Unión Molinense (5) | w/o
28 August
Lorca Deportiva (5) | 0
Murcia (3) | 4

Final
4 September
Unión Molinense (5) | 1
Murcia (3) | 3

Caravaca was disqualified from the tournament for fielding an ineligible player. Original result was 1–0.

==== Final ====
| 4 September | Unión Molinense (5) | 1–3 | Murcia (3) | Murcia |
| 19:00 | Samuel López 'Samu' 69' | Report | Pedro Benito 14'; Héctor Pérez 26'; Raúl Alcaina 78' | Stadium: Enrique Roca; Attendance: 3.500; Referee: García Acosta |

=== Navarre tournament ===
Four teams joined the tournament. The draw was made 2 July.

Semi-finals
28 August
Peña Sport (5) | 3
Ardoi (5) | 2
28 August
Izarra (4) | 1
Valle de Egüés (5) | 0

Final
11 September
Peña Sport (5) | 1
Izarra (4) | 2

=== Valencian Community tournament ===
La Nucía (5) and Soneja (5) joined the tournament.

| 13 August | La Nucía (5) | 1–0 | Soneja (5) | La Nucía |
| 19:30 | Álex García 53' | Report | | Stadium: Camilo Cano; Referee: Selva Vicente |

| 21 August | Soneja (5) | 0–1 | La Nucía (5) | Soneja |
| 18:30 | | Report | Leo Ramírez 84' (pen.) | Stadium: Municipal El Arco; Referee: Cabrera Esplugues |

== National phase ==
The national phase started on 25 September with 32 teams (20 winners of the Regional Tournaments, the best 5 teams from 2023–24 Segunda Federación not yet qualified for the 2024–25 Copa del Rey and the best 7 teams from the 2023–24 Tercera Federación not yet qualified for the 2024–25 Copa del Rey). The four semi-finalists will qualify for the 2024–25 Copa del Rey first round.

=== Qualified teams ===
- 5 best teams from 2023–24 Segunda Federación not yet qualified to 2024–25 Copa del Rey

- (La Rioja) Calahorra (4)
- (Galicia (Spain)) Compostela (4)
- (Catalonia) Terrassa (4)
- (Region of Murcia) UCAM Murcia (4)
- (Community of Madrid) Unión Adarve (4)

- 7 best teams from 2023–24 Tercera Federación not yet qualified to 2024–25 Copa del Rey

- (Castile and León) Atlético Tordesillas (5)
- (Castilla–La Mancha) Cazalegas (5)
- (Region of Murcia) Cieza (5)
- (Asturias) Lealtad (5)
- (Balearic Islands) Poblense (5)
- (Canary Islands) Unión Sur Yaiza (4)
- (Andalusia) Xerez Deportivo (4)

- Winners of Autonomous Communities tournaments

- (Andalusia) Atlético Mancha Real (5)
- (Asturias) Avilés Industrial (4)
- (Castilla–La Mancha) Calvo Sotelo (5)
- (Aragon) Caspe (5)
- Extremadura (5)
- (Navarre) Izarra (4)
- (Valencian Community) La Nucía (5)
- (Community of Madrid) Las Rozas (5)
- (Galicia (Spain)) Lugo (3)
- (Balearic Islands) Manacor (5)
- Melilla (4)
- (Canary Islands) Mensajero (5)
- (Region of Murcia) Murcia (3)
- (Andalusia) Pozoblanco (5)
- (Ceuta) Princípe Alfonso (6)
- (Catalonia) Sabadell (4)
- (Castile and León) Santa Marta (5)
- (Basque Country (autonomous community)) Sestao River (3)
- (La Rioja) Varea (5)
- (Cantabria) Vimenor (5)

=== Draw ===
The draw for the entire tournament was made at the RFEF headquarters on 13 September. The teams were divided into four pots based on geographical criteria. Each pot will be played independently until the semi-finals.

| Pot A | Pot B | Pot C | Pot D |
|---|---|---|---|
| (Asturias) Lealtad (5) (Asturias) Avilés Industrial (4) (Basque Country (autonomous community)) Sestao River (3) (Cantabria) Vimenor (5) (Galicia (Spain)) Compostela (4) (Galicia (Spain)) Lugo (3) (La Rioja) Calahorra (4) (La Rioja) Varea (5) | (Aragon) Caspe (5) (Balearic Islands) Manacor (5) (Balearic Islands) Poblense (5) (Catalonia) Sabadell (4) (Catalonia) Terrassa (4) (Region of Murcia) Murcia (3) (Navarre) Izarra (4) (Valencian Community) La Nucía (5) | (Canary Islands) Mensajero (5) (Canary Islands) Unión Sur Yaiza (4) (Castilla–La Mancha) Calvo Sotelo (5) (Castilla–La Mancha) Cazalegas (5) (Castile and León) Atlético Tordesillas (5) (Castile and León) Santa Marta (5) (Community of Madrid) Las Rozas (5) (Community of Madrid) Unión Adarve (4) | (Andalusia) At. Mancha Real (5) (Andalusia) Pozoblanco (5) (Andalusia) Xerez Deportivo (4) (Ceuta) Princípe Alfonso (6); Extremadura (5); Melilla (4) (Region of Murcia) Cieza (5) (Region of Murcia) UCAM Murcia (4) |

=== Round of 32 ===
Pot A

| 25 September | Varea (5) | 1–5 | Lugo (3) | Varea |
| 19:00 | Saúl Vega 54' | Report | Nathaniel Nicholas 8'; Fernando Lesme 25', 76'; Guille Perero 58'; Martín Ochoa 87' | Stadium: Municipal Ángel Aguado; Attendance: 200; Referee: López Romera (Navarre) |

| 25 September | Sestao River (3) | 0–0 (a.e.t.) (4–3 p) | Calahorra (4) | Sestao |
| 19:00 | | Report | | Stadium: Las Llanas; Attendance: 1.400; Referee: Ruiz Martín (Madrid) |

| 25 September | Avilés Industrial (4) | 0–2 | Lealtad (5) | Avilés |
| 19:30 | | Report | Jorge Fernández 59'; Saha 89' | Stadium: Estadio Román Suárez Puerta; Attendance: 800; Referee: García Presa (Castile and León) |

| 25 September | Vimenor (5) | 0–1 | Compostela (4) | Piélagos |
| 20:00 | | Report | Fer Cano 30' | Stadium: La Vidriera; Attendance: 200; Referee: Barrio Salas (Basque Country) |

Pot B

| 25 September | Poblense (5) | 4–2 | Izarra (4) | Sa Pobla |
| 18:00 | Juan A. Suasi 30'; Aitor Pons 33', 79'; Alberto Miguel Fernández 88' | Report | Víctor Higuera 15'; Pablo Grande 71' | Stadium: Nou Camp; Referee: Villaescusa Alarcón (Valencian Community) |

| 25 September | Murcia (3) | 1–1 (a.e.t.) (6–7 p) | Sabadell (4) | Murcia |
| 16:00 | Raúl Alcaina 44' | Report | Albert Orriols 'Urri' 62' | Stadium: Nueva Condomina; Attendance: 3.500; Referee: Herranz Monge (Valencian Community) |

| 25 September | Terrassa (4) | 1–1 (a.e.t.) (4–5 p) | La Nucía (5) | Terrassa |
| 20:00 | Aday Alcalde 32' (pen.) | Report | Loren Bianco 70' (pen.) | Stadium: Estadi Olímpic; Attendance: 500; Referee: González Rodríguez (Canary Islands) |

| 25 September | Manacor (5) | 0–0 (a.e.t.) (5–4 p) | Caspe (5) | Manacor |
| 17:00 | | Report | | Stadium: Na Capellera; Referee: Ibáñez Juárez (Murcia) |

Pot C

| 25 September | Las Rozas (5) | 2–1 | Mensajero (5) | Las Rozas |
| 20:00 | Iván Quivira 60' (pen.); Joselu Cano 69' | Report | Danil Ankudinov 46' | Stadium: Navalcarbón; Attendance: 200; Referee: Pinilla Serrano (Madrid) |

| 25 September | Atlético Tordesillas (5) | 1–2 | Calvo Sotelo (5) | Tordesillas |
| 18:00 | Carlos Alonso Villacorta 'Chatun' 90+5' | Report | Gustavo Pimentel 56'; Adri Sáez 63' | Stadium: Las Salinas; Attendance: 500; Referee: Lago Barreiro (Galicia) |

| 25 September | Cazalegas (5) | 2–1 | Unión Adarve (4) | Cazalegas |
| 20:45 | Adil Azarkan 16'; Jesús Moreno 20' | Report | David Flores 10' | Stadium: Ciudad Deportiva Ebora Formación; Attendance: 200; Referee: Asencio Pérez (Extremadura) |

| 25 September | Unión Sur Yaiza (4) | 1–2 | Santa Marta (5) | Yaiza |
| 19:00 | Rayco Pérez 14' | Report | Jaime Quijano 22'; Roberto Gándara 'Chopi' 78' | Stadium: Municipal; Attendance: 300; Referee: De Santiesteban Adame (Andalusia) |

Pot D

| 25 September | Extremadura (5) | 5–0 | Princípe Alfonso (6) | Almendralejo |
| 20:00 | Javi Bernal 22'; Leandro Izquierdo 70', 75', 84'; Miguel Núñez 73' | Report | | Stadium: Estadio Francisco de la Hera; Referee: De la Mata Martínez (Madrid) |

| 25 September | UCAM Murcia (4) | 3–0 | Pozoblanco (5) | Murcia |
| 19:30 | Diego López 17'; Albert Luque 74', 84' | Report | | Stadium: La Condomina; Referee: Pérez Sánchez (Castile La Mancha) |

| 25 September | Melilla (4) | 1–0 | Xerez Deportivo (4) | Melilla |
| 21:00 | Javi Ajenjo 33' | Report | | Stadium: La Espiguera; Referee: García Rubio (Castile La Mancha) |

| 26 September | At. Mancha Real (5) | 2–3 | Cieza (5) | Mancha Real |
| 20:00 | Ángel F. Arreola 17'; Pedro Corral 90' | Report | Javi López (penalty missed) 4'; Luismi Bueno 22'; Chema Lorente 44'; Dani Pérez 71' | Stadium: La Juventud; Attendance: 350; Referee: Muñoz García (Extremadura) |

=== Round of 16 ===
Pot A

| 2 October | Lugo (3) | 0–1 | Sestao River (3) | Lugo |
| 20:00 | | Report | Leandro Martínez 57' | Stadium: Anxo Carro; Attendance: 1.200; Referee: Saelices Puga (Asturias) |

| 3 October (Note: The match was originally played on 2 October 2024, but was suspended at the 18th minute and postponed until the following day due to flooding problems in the stadium.) | Lealtad (5) | 0–2 | Compostela (4) | Villaviciosa |
| 16:00 | | Report | Carlos Cinta 65'; Gonzalo Landeira 80' | Stadium: Les Caleyes; Attendance: 200; Referee: García Presa (Castile and León) |

Pot B

| 2 October | Poblense (5) | 1–1 (a.e.t.) (3–2 p) | Sabadell (4) | Sa Pobla |
| 19:00 | Marco Alarcón 33' | Report | Javi Delgado 52' | Stadium: Nou Camp; Attendance: 500; Referee: Madrid Martínez (Murcia) |

| 2 October | La Nucía (5) | 1–0 | Manacor (5) | La Nucía |
| 20:00 | Leo Ramírez 7' (pen.) | Report | | Stadium: Camilo Cano; Referee: Fernández Cintas (Andalusia) |

Pot C

| 2 October | Las Rozas (5) | 1–0 (a.e.t.) | Calvo Sotelo (5) | Las Rozas |
| 19:00 | Juan Losada 116' | Report | | Stadium: Navalcarbón; Attendance: 800; Referee: Cubas Torras (Balearic Islands) |

| 2 October | Cazalegas (5) | 3–3 (a.e.t.) (5–4 p) | Santa Marta (5) | Cazalegas |
| 20:45 | Alejandro Merchán 'Perdi' 21'; Dani Oliva 49'; Álex Cerri 90+6' | Report | Víctor Cascón 9'; Mano Tata 13'; Roberto Gándara 'Chopi' 27' | Stadium: Ciudad Deportiva Ébora Formación; Attendance: 250; Referee: López Montalbán (Madrid) |

Pot D

| 2 October | Extremadura (5) | 2–1 (a.e.t.) | UCAM Murcia (4) | Almendralejo |
| 19:00 | José Antonio Pardo 8'; Diego Díaz 'Dieguito' 109' | Report | Ale Marín 85' | Stadium: Estadio Francisco de la Hera; Referee: Manso Rojas (Castile and León) |

| 2 October | Melilla (4) | 0–0 (a.e.t.) (3–4 p) | Cieza (5) | Melilla |
| 21:00 | | Report | | Stadium: La Espiguera; Referee: Muñoz Moreno (Madrid) |

=== Quarter-finals ===
Winners qualified to the 2024–25 Copa del Rey first round.

Pot A

| 9 October | Sestao River (3) | 0–1 | Compostela (4) | Sestao |
| 19:30 | | | | Stadium: Las Llanas |

Pot B

| 9 October | Poblense (5) | 1–0 | La Nucía (5) | Sa Pobla |
| 19:00 | | | | Stadium: Nou Camp |

Pot C

| 9 October | Las Rozas (5) | 3–2 | Cazalegas (5) | Las Rozas |
| 19:30 | | | | Stadium: Navalcarbón |

Pot D

| 9 October | Extremadura (5) | 1–1 (a.e.t.) (4–1 p) | Cieza (5) | Almendralejo |
| 20:30 | | | | Stadium: Estadio Francisco de la Hera |

=== Semi-finals ===
| 16 October | Compostela (4) | 3–2 | Poblense (5) | Santiago de Compostela |
| 20:00 | | | | Stadium: San Lázaro |

| 6 November | Extremadura (5) | 1–0 | Las Rozas (5) | Almendralejo |
| 20:30 | | | | Stadium: Estadio Francisco de la Hera |

=== Final ===
| 13 November | Extremadura (5) | 2–1 | Compostela (4) | Almendralejo |
| 20:00 | | | | Stadium: Estadio Francisco de la Hera |
