= CD Cazalegas =

Association football club in Spain

Cazalegas
- Full name: Club Deportivo Cazalegas - Ebora Formación
- Founded: 2004
- Ground: Ciudad Deportiva Ebora Formación, Cazalegas, Castilla–La Mancha, Spain
- Capacity: 1,000
- President: Iván Fernández Grajera
- Head coach: Rubén Pulido
- League: Primera Autonómica Preferente – Group 2
- 2025–26: Tercera Federación – Group 18, 18th of 18 (relegated)
Home colours	Away colours

Club Deportivo Cazalegas - Ebora Formación is a Spanish football team located in Cazalegas, Toledo, in the autonomous community of Castilla–La Mancha. Founded in 2004, they play in Primera Autonómica Preferente – Group 2, holding home matches at Ciudad Deportiva Ebora Formación with a capacity of 1,000 spectators.

== Season to season ==
Season	Tier	Division	Place	Copa del Rey
2004–05	6	2ª Aut.	15th	
2005–2012	DNP			
2012–13	7	2ª Aut.	10th	
2013–14	7	2ª Aut.	15th	
2014–15	7	2ª Aut.	11th	
2015–16	7	2ª Aut.	9th	
2016–17	7	2ª Aut.	10th	
2017–18	7	2ª Aut.	2nd	
2018–19	6	1ª Aut.	14th	
2019–20	6	1ª Aut.	15th	
2020–21	6	1ª Aut.	1st	
2021–22	6	Aut. Pref.	2nd	
2022–23	6	Aut. Pref.	1st	First round
2023–24	5	3ª Fed.	2nd	
2024–25	5	3ª Fed.	8th	
2025–26	5	3ª Fed.		

- 3 seasons in Tercera Federación
