= Oriol Soldevila =

Spanish footballer (born 2001)

Personal information
- Full name: Oriol Soldevila Puig
- Date of birth: 26 March 2001 (age 25)
- Place of birth: Barcelona, Spain
- Height: 1.85 m (6 ft 1 in)
- Position: Midfielder

Team information
- Current team: Hércules
- Number: 7

Youth career
- 2015–2018: Cornellà
- 2018–2020: Barcelona
- 2020–2022: Birmingham City

Senior career*
Years	Team	Apps	(Gls)
2022–2024	Intercity	68	(7)
2024–	Hércules	37	(13)
- * Club domestic league appearances and goals as of 1 December 2025

Oriol Soldevila Puig (born 26 March 2001) is a Spanish professional footballer who plays as a midfielder for Hércules.

== Career ==
Soldevila was born in Barcelona, Catalonia. He began playing futsal at the age of five. After training in seven-a-side football with RCD Espanyol, he continued at Atlètic Sant Just FC, and turned down an approach from UE Cornellà in order to continue playing with his friends. In his first season of 11-a-side, his delayed growth meant that he only played the last two games, but that was enough to be scouted by Cornellà in the División de Honor Infantil.

Soldevila's performances for Cornellà attracted the attention of the two largest teams in Catalonia, FC Barcelona and Espanyol, and he joined the former's La Masia academy in 2018. He won the under-19 league in his first season and made substitute appearances in the following year's UEFA Youth League, from which Barcelona were eliminated at the group stage. He left at the end of his second season and trialled at Birmingham City – managed by compatriot Aitor Karanka – before signing for its under-21 team in the Premier League 2.

After 19 games, four goals and five assists in his second season in England, Soldevila returned to Spain. He signed a two-year deal with CF Intercity of the third-tier Primera Federación on 29 June 2022. Facing his former club Barcelona in the last 32 of the Copa del Rey on 4 January 2023, he scored a hat-trick to equalise three times, but Intercity still lost, 4–3 after extra time. He became the first player to score a hat-trick against Barcelona since Kylian Mbappé in 2021.

In the summer of 2024, Soldevila signed with Hércules in Primera Federación.

== Personal life ==
Soldevila, whose grandfather Oriol Puig was a national motocross champion, idolised the Spanish motorcycle rider Marc Márquez. He practised the sport himself until his Barcelona contract prohibited it.
