= CD L'Alcora =

Spanish football club

L'Alcora
- Full name: Club Deportivo L'Alcora
- Founded: 1967
- Ground: El Saltador, L'Alcora, Valencian Community, Spain
- Capacity: 1,500
- President: Alexis Mollón Nebot
- Head coach: Vicente Pastor
- League: Lliga Comunitat – North
- 2025–26: Lliga Comunitat – North, 12th of 16
Home colours	Away colours

Club Deportivo L'Alcora (sometimes spelled as Club Deportivo Alcora) is a Spanish football team based in L'Alcora, in the Valencian Community. Founded in 1967, it plays in Lliga Comunitat – North, holding home matches at Campo Municipal El Saltador, with a capacity of 1,500 people.

== History ==
=== Club background ===
- Agrupación Deportiva La Salle de Alcora (1967–1970)
- Club Deportivo Alcora (1970–1999)
- Club Deportivo L'Alcora (1999–present)

== Season to season ==
Season	Tier	Division	Place	Copa del Rey
1968–69	6	3ª Reg.	1st	
1969–70	6	3ª Reg.	2nd	
1970–71	6	2ª Reg.	6th	
1971–72	5	1ª Reg.	9th	
1972–73	5	1ª Reg.	15th	
1973–74	5	1ª Reg.	17th	
1974–75	5	1ª Reg.	16th	
1975–76	5	1ª Reg.	4th	
1976–77	5	1ª Reg.	7th	
1977–78	6	1ª Reg.	18th	
1978–79	6	1ª Reg.	20th	
1979–80	7	2ª Reg.	17th	
1980–81	7	2ª Reg.	8th	
1981–82	6	1ª Reg.	3rd	
1982–83	6	1ª Reg.	16th	
1983–84	6	1ª Reg.	11th	
1984–85	6	1ª Reg.	20th	
1985–86	7	2ª Reg.	5th	
1986–87	DNP			
1987–88	7	2ª Reg.	5th	

Season	Tier	Division	Place	Copa del Rey
1988–89	7	2ª Reg.	1st	
1989–90	6	1ª Reg.	1st	
1990–91	5	Reg. Pref.	13th	
1991–92	5	Reg. Pref.	17th	
1992–93	6	1ª Reg.	6th	
1993–94	6	1ª Reg.	9th	
1994–95	6	1ª Reg.	16th	
1995–96	6	1ª Reg.	2nd	
1996–97	5	Reg. Pref.	7th	
1997–98	5	Reg. Pref.	8th	
1998–99	5	Reg. Pref.	9th	
1999–2000	5	Reg. Pref.	8th	
2000–01	5	Reg. Pref.	8th	
2001–02	5	Reg. Pref.	13th	
2002–03	5	Reg. Pref.	7th	
2003–04	5	Reg. Pref.	6th	
2004–05	5	Reg. Pref.	12th	
2005–06	5	Reg. Pref.	10th	
2006–07	5	Reg. Pref.	15th	
2007–08	5	Reg. Pref.	16th	

Season	Tier	Division	Place	Copa del Rey
2008–09	6	1ª Reg.	1st	
2009–10	5	Reg. Pref.	14th	
2010–11	5	Reg. Pref.	17th	
2011–12	6	1ª Reg.	2nd	
2012–13	6	1ª Reg.	1st	
2013–14	5	Reg. Pref.	14th	
2014–15	5	Reg. Pref.	11th	
2015–16	5	Reg. Pref.	7th	
2016–17	5	Reg. Pref.	6th	
2017–18	5	Reg. Pref.	13th	
2018–19	5	Reg. Pref.	10th	
2019–20	5	Reg. Pref.	12th	
2020–21	5	Reg. Pref.	10th	
2021–22	6	Reg. Pref.	6th	
2022–23	6	Reg. Pref.	3rd	First round
2023–24	6	Lliga Com.	4th	
2024–25	6	Lliga Com.	6th	
2025–26	6	Lliga Com.	12th	
2026–27	6	Lliga Com.		
