= CD Amigó =

Association football club in Spain

Amigó
- Full name: Club Deportivo Amigó
- Founded: 1986
- Ground: Colegio Luis Amigó, Aranguren, Navarre, Spain
- Capacity: 1,000
- Chairman: Jesús Ederra
- Manager: Jairo López
- League: Regional Preferente – Group 1
- 2025–26: Regional Preferente – Group 1, 2nd of 16
Home colours	Away colours

Club Deportivo Amigó is a Spanish football club based in Aranguren, in the autonomous community of Navarre. Founded in 1986, the club play in the Regional Preferente – Group 1, holding home matches at the Campo de Futbol Colegio Luis Amigó.

== History ==
Founded in 1986 as a multi-sport branch of the Colegio Luis Amigó, Amigó started their football section in 1998, and achieved promotion to the Regional Preferente (fifth tier) in 2004. Relegated in 2010, the club continued to play in the Primera Regional in the following years, and returned to the Preferente in 2016, when the division was already corresponding to the sixth tier.

In September 2022, Amigó qualified to the 2022–23 Copa del Rey after winning the Supercopa de Navarra over FC Bidezarra.

== Season to season ==
Season	Tier	Division	Place	Copa del Rey
1998–99	6	1ª Reg.	11th	
1999–2000	6	1ª Reg.	12th	
2000–01	6	1ª Reg.	13th	
2001–02	6	1ª Reg.	8th	
2002–03	6	1ª Reg.	2nd	
2003–04	6	1ª Reg.	3rd	
2004–05	5	Reg. Pref.	11th	
2005–06	5	Reg. Pref.	6th	
2006–07	5	Reg. Pref.	13th	
2007–08	5	Reg. Pref.	7th	
2008–09	5	Reg. Pref.	4th	
2009–10	5	Reg. Pref.	15th	
2010–11	6	1ª Reg.	5th	
2011–12	6	1ª Reg.	4th	
2012–13	6	1ª Reg.	5th	
2013–14	6	1ª Reg.	4th	
2014–15	6	1ª Reg.	9th	
2015–16	7	1ª Reg.	3rd	
2016–17	6	Reg. Pref.	5th	
2017–18	6	Reg. Pref.	10th	

Season	Tier	Division	Place	Copa del Rey
2018–19	6	Reg. Pref.	10th	
2019–20	6	Reg. Pref.	9th	
2020–21	6	Reg. Pref.	4th	
2021–22	7	Reg. Pref.	5th	
2022–23	7	Reg. Pref.	1st	Preliminary
2023–24	6	1ª Aut.	16th	
2024–25	7	Reg. Pref.	9th	
2025–26	7	Reg. Pref.		
