= CD Fuentes =

Association football club in Spain

Fuentes
- Full name: Club Deportivo Fuentes
- Founded: 1963
- Ground: San Miguel; Fuentes de Ebro, Aragon, Spain
- Capacity: 1,000
- President: Jesús Linares Sierra
- Head coach: Iván Ballesteros
- League: Regional Preferente – Group 2
- 2025–26: Regional Preferente – Group 2, 6th of 18
Home colours	Away colours

Club Deportivo Fuentes is a Spanish football team based in Fuentes de Ebro, in the autonomous community of Aragon. Founded in 1963, the club plays in the Regional Preferente – Group 2, and holds home games at Campo de Fútbol San Miguel, with a capacity of 1,000 people.

== Season to season ==
Season	Tier	Division	Place	Copa del Rey
1968–69	6	2ª Reg.	9th	
1969–70	6	2ª Reg.	4th	
1970–71	6	2ª Reg.	3rd	
1971–72	6	2ª Reg.	2nd	
1972–73	6	2ª Reg. P.	16th	
1973–74	6	2ª Reg. P.	18th	
1974–75	7	2ª Reg.	3rd	
1975–76	7	2ª Reg.	1st	
1976–77	6	2ª Reg. P.	9th	
1977–78	6	1ª Reg.	13th	
1978–79	6	1ª Reg.	15th	
1979–80	6	1ª Reg.	18th	
1980–81	6	1ª Reg.	10th	
1981–82	6	1ª Reg.	8th	
1982–83	6	1ª Reg.	13th	
1983–84	6	1ª Reg.	13th	
1984–85	6	1ª Reg.	4th	
1985–86	6	1ª Reg.	7th	
1986–87	DNP			
1987–88	8	3ª Reg.	1st	

Season	Tier	Division	Place	Copa del Rey
1988–89	6	2ª Reg.	1st	
1989–90	6	1ª Reg.	1st	
1990–91	5	Reg. Pref.	9th	
1991–92	5	Reg. Pref.	15th	
1992–93	6	1ª Reg.	5th	
1993–94	6	1ª Reg.	6th	
1994–95	6	1ª Reg.	1st	
1995–96	5	Reg. Pref.	5th	
1996–97	5	Reg. Pref.	5th	
1997–98	5	Reg. Pref.	2nd	
1998–99	4	3ª	12th	
1999–2000	4	3ª	9th	
2000–01	4	3ª	17th	
2001–02	4	3ª	9th	
2002–03	4	3ª	9th	
2003–04	4	3ª	19th	
2004–05	5	Reg. Pref.	1st	
2005–06	4	3ª	19th	
2006–07	5	Reg. Pref.	3rd	
2007–08	5	Reg. Pref.	12th	

Season	Tier	Division	Place	Copa del Rey
2008–09	5	Reg. Pref.	3rd	
2009–10	5	Reg. Pref.	12th	
2010–11	5	Reg. Pref.	11th	
2011–12	5	Reg. Pref.	14th	
2012–13	5	Reg. Pref.	6th	
2013–14	5	Reg. Pref.	8th	
2014–15	5	Reg. Pref.	13th	
2015–16	5	Reg. Pref.	5th	
2016–17	5	Reg. Pref.	7th	
2017–18	5	Reg. Pref.	4th	
2018–19	5	Reg. Pref.	12th	
2019–20	5	Reg. Pref.	3rd	
2020–21	5	Reg. Pref.	3rd	
2021–22	6	Reg. Pref.	2nd	
2022–23	6	Reg. Pref.	2nd	First round
2023–24	5	3ª Fed.	14th	
2024–25	5	3ª Fed.	18th	
2025–26	6	Reg. Pref.	6th	
2026–27	6	Reg. Pref.		

- 7 seasons in Tercera División
- 2 seasons in Tercera Federación
