= Dinamo de San Juan CF =

Spanish football team

Dinamo San Juan
- Full name: Dinamo de San Juan Club de Fútbol
- Founded: 30 July 1973; 53 years ago
- Ground: San Juan, Santurtzi, Basque Country, Spain
- Capacity: 2,000
- President: Álex Díaz
- Head coach: Raúl Quintana
- League: División de Honor
- 2025–26: Preferente, 1st of 18 (champions)
Home colours	Away colours

Dinamo de San Juan Club de Fútbol is a Spanish football team based in Santurtzi, in the Autonomous Community of the Basque Country. Founded in 1973, they play in División de Honor, holding home games at Campo de Fútbol de San Juan which has a capacity of 600 spectators.

== Season to season ==
Season	Tier	Division	Place	Copa del Rey
1974–75	6	2ª Reg.	13th	
1975–76	6	2ª Reg.	11th	
1976–77	6	2ª Reg.	7th	
1977–78	7	2ª Reg.	6th	
1978–79	7	2ª Reg.	4th	
1979–80	7	2ª Reg.	13th	
1980–81	7	2ª Reg.	9th	
1981–82	7	2ª Reg.	8th	
1982–83	7	2ª Reg.	5th	
1983–84	7	2ª Reg.	3rd	
1984–85	7	2ª Reg.	1st	
1985–86	6	1ª Reg.	15th	
1986–87	6	1ª Reg.	11th	
1987–88	6	1ª Reg.	18th	
1988–89	7	2ª Reg.	2nd	
1989–90	6	1ª Reg.	12th	
1990–91	6	1ª Terr.	14th	
1991–92	6	1ª Terr.	15th	
1992–93	6	1ª Terr.	17th	
1993–94	7	2ª Terr.	3rd	

Season	Tier	Division	Place	Copa del Rey
1994–95	7	2ª Terr.	5th	
1995–96	7	2ª Terr.	7th	
1996–97	7	2ª Terr.	1st	
1997–98	6	1ª Terr.	15th	
1998–99	6	1ª Terr.	2nd	
1999–2000	5	Terr. Pref.	14th	
2000–01	5	Terr. Pref.	18th	
2001–02	6	1ª Terr.	4th	
2002–03	6	Pref.	16th	
2003–04	7	1ª Div.	9th	
2004–05	7	1ª Div.	12th	
2005–06	7	1ª Div.	15th	
2006–07	8	2ª Div.	4th	
2007–08	8	2ª Div.	3rd	
2008–09	8	2ª Div.	1st	
2009–10	7	1ª Div.	7th	
2010–11	7	1ª Div.	8th	
2011–12	7	1ª Div.	11th	
2012–13	7	1ª Div.	3rd	
2013–14	7	1ª Div.	13th	

Season	Tier	Division	Place	Copa del Rey
2014–15	7	1ª Div.	1st	
2015–16	6	Pref.	14th	
2016–17	6	Pref.	9th	
2017–18	6	Pref.	3rd	
2018–19	5	Div. Hon.	12th	
2019–20	5	Div. Hon.	14th	
2020–21	5	Div. Hon.	4th	
2021–22	6	Div. Hon.	2nd	
2022–23	6	Div. Hon.	14th	Preliminary
2023–24	6	Div. Hon.	11th	
2024–25	6	Div. Hon.	17th	
2025–26	7	Pref.		
