= Carlos Cristeto =

Spanish footballer

Personal information
- Full name: Carlos Cristeto de Dios
- Date of birth: 13 May 1994 (age 32)
- Place of birth: Salamanca, Spain
- Height: 1.79 m (5 ft 10 in)
- Position: Midfielder

Team information
- Current team: Salamanca CF
- Number: 10

Youth career
- Salamanca
- 2012–2013: Mallorca

Senior career*
Years	Team	Apps	(Gls)
2012	Salamanca	1	(0)
2012–2016	Mallorca B	72	(8)
2012	Mallorca	0	(0)
2015	→ Poblense (loan)	19	(3)
2016	Atlético Baleares	20	(0)
2017–2018	Panegialios	6	(1)
2018	Lorca Deportiva	10	(0)
2018–2023	Peña Deportiva	89	(2)
2023–	Salamanca CF	98	(5)
- * Club domestic league appearances and goals as of 14 May 2026

Carlos Cristeto de Dios (born 13 May 1994) is a Spanish professional footballer who plays as a midfielder for Salamanca CF.

== Football career ==
Born in Salamanca, Castile and León, Cristeto graduated from local UD Salamanca's youth system, making his senior debuts in 2011–12 season, in Segunda División B. In June 2012 he joined RCD Mallorca, being assigned to the reserves also in the third level.

On 29 November Cristeto made his professional debut, playing the last 32 minutes of a 0–0 home draw against Deportivo de La Coruña, for the season's Copa del Rey. On 30 January 2015 he was loaned to UD Poblense, until June.

Cristeto was released by the Bermellones at the end of the 2015–16 season. On 16 July 2016, he signed for CD Atlético Baleares in the third division, after impressing on a trial. On 3 August 2017 he signed for Panegialios in the Greek second division
