= Montilla CF =

Association football club in Spain

Montilla
- Full name: Montilla Club de Fútbol
- Nicknames: Amarillos, Auriverdes
- Founded: 1973
- Ground: Municipal, Montilla, Córdoba, Andalusia, Spain
- Capacity: 5,000
- President: Francisco Mesa
- Manager: José Ángel Garrido
- League: División de Honor – Group 1
- 2025–26: División de Honor – Group 1, 4th of 16
Home colours	Away colours

Montilla Club de Fútbol is a Spanish football team based in Montilla, Córdoba, in the autonomous community of Andalusia. Founded in 1973, they play in División de Honor – Group 1, holding home matches at Estadio Municipal de Montilla, with a capacity of 5,000 spectators.

== History ==
Montilla CF was founded in August 1973, after Club Balompédico Alvear (another club from the city funded by Bodegas Alvear) were ceasing their activities. The club immediately took Alvear's place in the Regional Preferente, and achieved promotion to Tercera División in 1987.

After 13 consecutive seasons in the fourth division, Montilla suffered relegation in 2000, but returned to the category at first attempt. The club would spend the following seasons in the lower leagues, aside from a campaign back in the fourth tier in 2012–13.

== Season to season ==
Season	Tier	Division	Place	Copa del Rey
1973–74	4	1ª Reg.	8th	
1974–75	4	1ª Reg.	8th	
1975–76	4	Reg. Pref.	13th	
1976–77	4	Reg. Pref.	12th	
1977–78	5	Reg. Pref.	16th	
1978–79	5	Reg. Pref.	7th	
1979–80	5	Reg. Pref.	9th	
1980–81	5	Reg. Pref.	4th	
1981–82	5	Reg. Pref.	7th	
1982–83	5	Reg. Pref.	8th	
1983–84	5	Reg. Pref.	3rd	
1984–85	5	Reg. Pref.	2nd	
1985–86	5	Reg. Pref.	6th	
1986–87	5	Reg. Pref.	2nd	
1987–88	4	3ª	15th	
1988–89	4	3ª	15th	
1989–90	4	3ª	16th	
1990–91	4	3ª	10th	Second round
1991–92	4	3ª	13th	
1992–93	4	3ª	14th	

Season	Tier	Division	Place	Copa del Rey
1993–94	4	3ª	17th	
1994–95	4	3ª	5th	
1995–96	4	3ª	6th	
1996–97	4	3ª	5th	
1997–98	4	3ª	14th	
1998–99	4	3ª	9th	
1999–2000	4	3ª	18th	
2000–01	5	Reg. Pref.	1st	
2001–02	4	3ª	8th	
2002–03	4	3ª	14th	
2003–04	4	3ª	20th	
2004–05	5	1ª And.	4th	
2005–06	5	1ª And.	3rd	
2006–07	5	1ª And.	4th	
2007–08	5	1ª And.	3rd	
2008–09	5	1ª And.	3rd	
2009–10	5	1ª And.	14th	
2010–11	5	1ª And.	14th	
2011–12	5	1ª And.	3rd	
2012–13	4	3ª	20th	

Season	Tier	Division	Place	Copa del Rey
2013–14	5	1ª And.	17th	
2014–15	6	2ª And.	5th	
2015–16	6	1ª And.	2nd	
2016–17	6	1ª And.	2nd	
2017–18	5	Div. Hon.	15th	
2018–19	6	1ª And.	2nd	
2019–20	6	1ª And.	1st	
2020–21	5	Div. Hon.	2nd	
2021–22	6	Div. Hon.	5th	
2022–23	6	Div. Hon.	12th	Preliminary
2023–24	6	Div. Hon.	5th	
2024–25	6	Div. Hon.	7th	
2025–26	6	Div. Hon.		

- 17 seasons in Tercera División
