= CD Santa Amalia =

Spanish football club

Santa Amalia
- Full name: Club Deportivo Santa Amalia
- Founded: 1969
- Ground: Estadio Municipal, Santa Amalia, Extremadura, Spain
- Capacity: 500
- Chairman: (Spain) José María González Ruiz
- League: Tercera Federación – Group 14
- 2025–26: Tercera Federación – Group 14, 13th of 18
Home colours	Away colours

Club Deportivo Santa Amalia is a Spanish football team based in Santa Amalia, in the autonomous community of Extremadura. Founded in 1969, they play in Tercera Federación – Group 14, holding home games at Estadio Municipal.

== Season to season ==
Season	Tier	Division	Place	Copa del Rey
1969–70	5	2ª Reg.	1st	
1970–71	4	1ª Reg.	15th	
1971–72	4	1ª Reg.	13th	
1972–73	4	1ª Reg.	19th	
1973–74	5	2ª Reg.	2nd	
1974–75	5	1ª Reg.	4th	
1975–76	5	1ª Reg.	5th	
1976–77	5	1ª Reg.	6th	
1977–78	6	1ª Reg.	4th	
1978–79	6	1ª Reg.	2nd	
1979–80	5	Reg. Pref.	14th	
1980–81	5	Reg. Pref.	18th	
1981–82	6	1ª Reg.	1st	
1982–83	5	Reg. Pref.	18th	
1983–84	5	Reg. Pref.	17th	
1984–85	6	1ª Reg.	16th	
1985–86	6	1ª Reg.	2nd	
1986–87	6	1ª Reg.	3rd	
1987–88	6	1ª Reg.	2nd	
1988–89	6	1ª Reg.	2nd	

Season	Tier	Division	Place	Copa del Rey
1989–90	5	Reg. Pref.	8th	
1990–91	5	Reg. Pref.	11th	
1991–92	5	Reg. Pref.	3rd	
1992–93	5	Reg. Pref.	1st	
1993–94	4	3ª	16th	
1994–95	4	3ª	15th	
1995–96	4	3ª	8th	
1996–97	4	3ª	10th	
1997–98	4	3ª	16th	
1998–99	4	3ª	16th	
1999–2000	5	Reg. Pref.	1st	
2000–01	4	3ª	14th	
2001–02	4	3ª	15th	
2002–03	4	3ª	11th	
2003–04	4	3ª	6th	
2004–05	4	3ª	14th	
2005–06	4	3ª	11th	
2006–07	4	3ª	14th	
2007–08	4	3ª	19th	
2008–09	5	Reg. Pref.	14th	

Season	Tier	Division	Place	Copa del Rey
2009–10	5	Reg. Pref.	2nd	
2010–11	4	3ª	6th	
2011–12	4	3ª	13th	
2012–13	4	3ª	9th	
2013–14	4	3ª	15th	
2014–15	4	3ª	10th	
2015–16	4	3ª	17th	
2016–17	4	3ª	16th	
2017–18	4	3ª	20th	
2018–19	5	1ª Ext.	7th	
2019–20	5	1ª Ext.	6th	
2020–21	5	1ª Ext.	3rd	
2021–22	6	1ª Ext.	5th	
2022–23	6	1ª Ext.	1st	First round
2023–24	6	1ª Ext.	1st	
2024–25	5	3ª Fed.	7th	
2025–26	5	3ª Fed.	13th	
2026–27	5	3ª Fed.		

- 22 seasons in Tercera División
- 3 seasons in Tercera Federación
