= Cris Montes =

Spanish footballer (born 1997)

Personal information
- Full name: Cristian Montes López
- Date of birth: 10 August 1997 (age 29)
- Place of birth: Santa Cruz de Tenerife, Spain
- Height: 1.63 m (5 ft 4 in)
- Position: Attacking midfielder

Youth career
- Sporting Gijón

Senior career*
Years	Team	Apps	(Gls)
2015–2018	Sporting B	10	(1)
2017	→ Lealtad (loan)	7	(0)
2017–2018	→ Langreo (loan)	38	(25)
2018–2020	Omonia	20	(2)
2019–2020	→ Badalona (loan)	24	(3)
2020	→ Nea Salamina (loan)	5	(0)
2021–2022	Unionistas	49	(7)
2022–2024	Eldense	72	(7)
2025	Unión Española	5	(0)
2025–2026	Tenerife	10	(0)
- * Club domestic league appearances and goals as of 9 June 2026

Cristian Montes López (born 10 August 1997) is a Spanish professional footballer. Mainly an attacking midfielder, he can also play as a winger.

== Club career ==
Born in Santa Cruz de Tenerife, Canary Islands, Montes graduated from the youth academy of Sporting de Gijón. On 7 February 2016, he made his debut for the reserves, coming on as a substitute of Cyril Dreyer in a 1–0 defeat against Racing de Ferrol. On 13 March, he scored his first goal for the club in a 2–1 victory over UD Logroñés.

In order to get more playing time, Montes joined CD Lealtad on a loan deal on 13 January 2017. On 12 July, he was loaned out to UP Langreo. He scored 25 goals during the season, which included hat-tricks against CD Mosconia, Club Siero and CD Colunga.

On 31 July 2018, Montes moved abroad and joined Cypriot First Division club AC Omonia on a three-year contract. He made his professional debut on 25 August, starting in a 1–0 home win over Alki Oroklini, and scored his first goal on 4 May 2019, in a 3–2 away loss against AEL Limassol.

On 6 August 2019, Montes returned to his home country and was loaned to CF Badalona in the third division, for one year. He moved to fellow Cypriot side Nea Salamina Famagusta FC on 14 September 2020, also on loan.

On 24 December 2020, Montes signed a contract with Unionistas de Salamanca CF back in his country's third tier. He immediately became a regular starter for the side, scoring six goals in the 2021–22 Primera División RFEF.

On 28 June 2022, Montes agreed to a deal with Primera Federación side CD Eldense. He contributed with seven goals in 40 matches overall during the campaign, as the club returned to Segunda División after a 59-year absence.

On 15 January 2025, Montes signed with Chilean Primera División side Unión Española. On 28 July, he returned to his hometown after joining CD Tenerife on a one-year deal.

== Career statistics ==
=== Club ===
As of match played on 16 February 2020

Club	Season	League			Cup		Other		Total	
Club	Season	Division	Apps	Goals	Apps	Goals	Apps	Goals	Apps	Goals
Sporting Gijón B	2015–16	Segunda División B	5	1	—		—		5	1
Sporting Gijón B	2016–17	Tercera División	5	0	—		—		5	0
Sporting Gijón B	Total		10	1	—		—		10	1
Lealtad (loan)	2016–17	Segunda División B	7	0	0	0	—		7	0
Langreo (loan)	2017–18	Tercera División	38	25	0	0	—		38	25
Omonia	2018–19	Cypriot First Division	20	2	2	0	—		22	2
Badalona (loan)	2019–20	Segunda División B	24	3	3	2	2 (Note: Appearance in Copa Catalunya)	0	29	5
Career total			99	31	5	2	3	0	107	33
