= Loren Sánchez =

Spanish footballer (born 2003)

Loren
Personal information
- Full name: Lorenzo Sánchez Martínez
- Date of birth: 14 February 2003 (age 23)
- Place of birth: Madrid, Spain
- Height: 1.87 m (6 ft 2 in)
- Position: Forward

Team information
- Current team: Tenerife B
- Number: 18

Youth career
- 2012–2016: Las Rozas
- 2016–2019: Getafe
- 2019–2021: Valencia
- 2021–2022: Real Madrid

Senior career*
Years	Team	Apps	(Gls)
2022–2023	Real Madrid B	0	(0)
2022–2023	→ Peña Deportiva (loan)	28	(2)
2023–2025	Almería B	60	(20)
2024–2025	Almería	1	(0)
2025–	Tenerife B	15	(3)
- * Club domestic league appearances and goals as of 7 May 2026

Lorenzo Sánchez Martínez (born 14 February 2003), known as Loren Sánchez or just Loren, is a Spanish professional footballer who plays as a forward for CD Tenerife B.

== Career ==
Born in Madrid, Loren represented Las Rozas CF, Getafe CF and Valencia CF before joining Real Madrid's La Fábrica in July 2021. On 26 August of the following year, after finishing his formation, he was loaned to Segunda Federación side SCR Peña Deportiva for the season.

Loren made his senior debut on 4 September 2022, coming on as a second-half substitute in a 0–0 home draw against SD Formentera. He scored his first goal the following 19 March, netting Peña's third in a 3–0 away win over CD Ibiza Islas Pitiusas.

On 23 August 2023, Loren moved to UD Almería and was initially assigned to the reserves in Tercera Federación. Despite being mainly used as a backup option, he scored 12 goals during the campaign as the B-side achieved promotion to the fourth division.

Loren made his first team debut with the Andalusians on 30 October 2024, replacing Marko Milovanović in a 2–1 Copa del Rey away win over UD San Sebastián de los Reyes. He made his Segunda División debut the following 19 January, replacing Dion Lopy late into a 0–0 home draw against SD Huesca.

On 13 August 2025, Loren signed for another reserve team, CD Tenerife B also in division four.
