= Cyril Dreyer =

French footballer (born 1994)

Personal information
- Full name: Cyril Dreyer
- Date of birth: 19 March 1994 (age 32)
- Place of birth: Strasbourg, France
- Height: 1.77 m (5 ft 10 in)
- Position: Midfielder

Team information
- Current team: Bischheim

Youth career
- 2007–2012: Strasbourg

Senior career*
Years	Team	Apps	(Gls)
2012–2015	Nancy II	65	(2)
2014	Nancy	0	(0)
2015–2016	Sporting B	27	(1)
2016–2018	Schiltigheim	45	(3)
2018–2019	Erstein		
2019–2021	Molsheim		
2021–	Bischheim		
- * Club domestic league appearances and goals as of 28 May 2023

Cyril Dreyer (born 19 March 1994) is a French footballer who plays for FC Soleil Bischheim as a central midfielder.

== Club career ==
Born in Strasbourg, Dreyer finished his formation with RC Strasbourg. In 2012, after the club's dissolution, he moved to AS Nancy, being assigned to the reserves in Championnat de France amateur.

On 26 August 2014 Dreyer made his professional debut, coming on as a second-half substitute for François Bellugou in a 0–3 Coupe de la Ligue away loss against AJ Auxerre. Roughly a year later he moved abroad for the first time in his career, joining Spanish side Sporting de Gijón but being assigned to its B-team in Segunda División B.
