= CF Vimenor =

Association football club in Spain

Coordinates: 43.356757°N 3.967670°W

Vimenor
- Full name: Club de Fútbol Vimenor
- Founded: 1929
- Ground: La Vidriera, Vioño de Piélagos, Piélagos, Cantabria, Spain
- Capacity: 1,500
- Chairman: Manuel José Menezo
- Manager: Oscar Carrera
- League: Tercera Federación – Group 3
- 2025–26: Tercera Federación – Group 3, 6th of 18
Home colours	Away colours

Club de Fútbol Vimenor is a football team based in Vioño de Piélagos, Piélagos in the autonomous community of Cantabria. Founded in 1929 as a section of the factory "Vimenor" ("VIdriera MEcánica del NORte"), the team plays in Tercera Federación – Group 3. The club's home ground is La Vidriera, which has a capacity of 1,500 spectators.

== History ==
The club finished 7th in Tercera División, Group 3 in the 2015–16 season. In the 2018–19 season, the club finished 8th in the Tercera División, Group 3.

== Season to season ==
Season	Tier	Division	Place	Copa del Rey
1946–47	5	2ª Reg.	3rd	
1947–48	4	1ª Reg.	5th	
1948–49	4	1ª Reg.	5th	
1949–50	4	1ª Reg.	1st	
1950–51	4	1ª Reg.	7th	
1951–52	6	3ª Reg.	5th	
1952–53	6	3ª Reg.	4th	
1953–54	6	3ª Reg.	5th	
1954–55	5	2ª Reg.	8th	
1955–56	6	3ª Reg.	5th	
1956–57	DNP			
1957–58	5	2ª Reg.	10th	
1958–1965	DNP			
1965–66	4	1ª Reg.	16th	
1966–67	4	1ª Reg.	3rd	
1967–68	4	1ª Reg.	8th	
1968–69	5	2ª Reg.	7th	
1969–70	5	2ª Reg.	4th	
1970–71	5	2ª Reg.	4th	
1971–72	5	2ª Reg.	6th	

Season	Tier	Division	Place	Copa del Rey
1972–73	5	2ª Reg.	3rd	
1973–74	4	1ª Reg.	17th	
1974–75	5	1ª Reg.	5th	
1975–76	5	1ª Reg.	1st	
1976–77	4	Reg. Pref.	12th	
1977–78	5	Reg. Pref.	4th	
1978–79	5	Reg. Pref.	7th	
1979–80	5	Reg. Pref.	7th	
1980–81	5	Reg. Pref.	3rd	
1981–82	5	Reg. Pref.	10th	
1982–83	5	Reg. Pref.	13th	
1983–84	5	Reg. Pref.	18th	
1984–85	6	1ª Reg.	2nd	
1985–86	5	Reg. Pref.	5th	
1986–87	4	3ª	14th	
1987–88	4	3ª	4th	
1988–89	4	3ª	5th	
1989–90	4	3ª	7th	
1990–91	4	3ª	16th	First round
1991–92	4	3ª	19th	

Season	Tier	Division	Place	Copa del Rey
1992–93	5	Reg. Pref.	12th	
1993–94	5	Reg. Pref.	9th	
1994–95	5	Reg. Pref.	5th	
1995–96	5	Reg. Pref.	5th	
1996–97	5	Reg. Pref.	2nd	
1997–98	4	3ª	19th	
1998–99	5	Reg. Pref.	6th	
1999–2000	5	Reg. Pref.	6th	
2000–01	5	Reg. Pref.	2nd	
2001–02	4	3ª	14th	
2002–03	4	3ª	12th	
2003–04	4	3ª	10th	
2004–05	4	3ª	16th	
2005–06	4	3ª	18th	
2006–07	5	Reg. Pref.	6th	
2007–08	5	Reg. Pref.	3rd	
2008–09	4	3ª	17th	
2009–10	4	3ª	16th	
2010–11	4	3ª	16th	
2011–12	4	3ª	12th	

Season	Tier	Division	Place	Copa del Rey
2012–13	4	3ª	6th	
2013–14	4	3ª	11th	
2014–15	4	3ª	10th	
2015–16	4	3ª	7th	
2016–17	4	3ª	15th	
2017–18	4	3ª	15th	
2018–19	4	3ª	8th	
2019–20	4	3ª	18th	
2020–21	4	3ª	4th / 1st	
2021–22	5	3ª RFEF	2nd	
2022–23	5	3ª Fed.	2nd	First round
2023–24	5	3ª Fed.	5th	
2024–25	5	3ª Fed.	6th	
2025–26	5	3ª Fed.	6th	
2026–27	5	3ª Fed.		

- 25 seasons in Tercera División
- 6 seasons in Tercera Federación/Tercera División RFEF
