= Juanma Acevedo =

Spanish footballer (born 1992)

Personal information
- Full name: Juan Manuel Acevedo Marín
- Date of birth: 24 March 1992 (age 34)
- Place of birth: Sant Vicent del Raspeig, Spain
- Height: 1.75 m (5 ft 9 in)
- Position: Winger

Team information
- Current team: Lorca Deportiva
- Number: 24

Youth career
- Jove Español
- 2005–2009: Hércules
- 2009–2010: Jove Español
- 2010–2011: Torrellano Illice

Senior career*
Years	Team	Apps	(Gls)
2011–2012	Elche Ilicitano		
2012–2013	Jove Español B		
2012–2013	Jove Español		
2013–2014	Hércules B	25	(9)
2014–2015	Hércules	12	(1)
2015	→ El Castillo (loan)	14	(5)
2015	Torrevieja	12	(0)
2015–2016	Peña Deportiva	24	(4)
2016–2017	Águilas	37	(19)
2017–2018	Villarrobledo	37	(16)
2018–2019	Castellón	11	(1)
2019	Socuéllamos	23	(6)
2019–2020	Alcoyano	30	(8)
2020–2021	Khaitan		(2)
2021–2022	Villarrubia	15	(4)
2022	Eldense	14	(0)
2022–2024	Atlético Saguntino	50	(8)
2024	Marbella	18	(1)
2024–2025	Torrent	31	(4)
2025–	Lorca Deportiva	29	(2)
- * Club domestic league appearances and goals as of 15 May 2026

Juan Manuel 'Juanma' Acevedo Marín (born 24 March 1992) is a Spanish footballer who plays as a left winger for Segunda Federación club Lorca Deportiva.

== Club career ==
Born in Sant Vicent del Raspeig, Alicante, Acevedo finished his graduation in lowly Torrellano Illice CF's youth setup, and made his senior debuts with Elche CF's reserve team in the 2011–12 season. In December 2011 he was called up to train with the first team by manager José Bordalás.

In the 2012 summer Acevedo joined FC Jove Español San Vicente, but was assigned to the B-side. A year later he moved to Hércules CF, after the assignment of Jove Español as farm team; however, he was assigned to the B-team in the regional leagues.

On 30 March 2014 Acevedo played his first match as a professional, coming on as a second-half substitute in a 1–1 draw at Real Jaén in the Segunda División. In August, he was definitely promoted to the main squad, now in the Segunda División B.
