= CF Lorca Deportiva =

Association football club in Spain

C.F. Lorca Deportiva
- Full name: Club de Fútbol Lorca Deportiva
- Nicknames: El Deportiva, El Lorca
- Founded: 27 July 2012; 14 years ago
- Ground: Francisco Artés Carrasco; Lorca, Murcia, Spain
- Capacity: 8,100
- President: (Mexico) Sergio Zyman
- Head coach: (Spain) Sebastián López
- League: Segunda Federación – Group 3
- 2025–26: Segunda Federación – Group 4, 10th of 18
- Website: www.lorcadeportiva.es
Home colours	Away colours

Club de Fútbol Lorca Deportiva is a Spanish football club based in Lorca, in the autonomous community of the Region of Murcia. Founded in 2012, the club play in Segunda Federación – Group 3. Lorca holds it home games at Estadio Francisco Artés Carrasco, which has an 8,064-seat capacity. The roots of the club can be traced back to the Sociedad Lorca Football Club, founded in 1901 by Newcastle-born Manuel José (Manni) Pelegrín Dunn, whose father was originally from Lorca.

== History ==
The club was founded after the dissolution of Lorca Atlético in 2012, by supporters who did not support La Hoya Lorca CF, as this team was based in the hamlet of La Hoya.

In its first season, despite being registered in Segunda Autonómica, the seventh division, it played one level above after filling a vacant place. After two promotions in three seasons, Lorca Deportiva made its debut in Tercera División in 2015. The club won the league but could not achieve promotion to Segunda División B. But it the next season the club finally managed to promote to the next category, Segunda División B.

In the 2018–19 season the club finished 2nd in the Group 13 of the Tercera División, but failed to promote to Segunda División B in the promotion playoffs. On July 11, 2019 Iván Urbano was appointed the new head coach of the club.

In the 2024-2025 season, Lorca Deportiva achieved promotion to the Segunda Federación after finishing the tournament as champions of Group XIII of the Tercera Federación under head coach Sebastián López. This title, under Club President Sergio Zyman, is the 1st first team trophy of the Mexican-led ownership group, led by Jacques Passy, that took full control of the Club in the 2022-2023 season. In addition, the club qualified to the 2025-2026 edition of the Copa del Rey.

== Season to season ==
Season	Level	Division	Place	Copa del Rey
2012–13	6	1ª Aut.	8th	
2013–14	6	1ª Aut.	3rd	
2014–15	5	Pref. Aut.	1st	
2015–16	4	3ª	1st	
2016–17	4	3ª	1st	First round
2017–18	3	2ª B	20th	Second round
2018–19	4	3ª	2nd	
2019–20	4	3ª	1st	First round
2020–21	3	2ª B	10th / 7th	First round
2021–22	5	3ª RFEF	6th	
2022–23	5	3ª Fed.	2nd	
2023–24	5	3ª Fed.	6th	First round
2024–25	5	3ª Fed.	1st	
2025–26	4	2ª Fed.	10th	First round
2026–27	4	2ª Fed.		

- 2 seasons in Segunda División B
- 2 seasons in Segunda Federación
- 4 seasons in Tercera División
- 4 seasons in Tercera Federación/Tercera División RFEF

== Current squad ==
As of 7 April 2026

Note: Flags indicate national team as defined under FIFA eligibility rules; some limited exceptions apply. Players may hold more than one non-FIFA nationality.

No.	Pos.	Nation	Player
1	GK	LTU	Ernestas Juškevičius
2	DF	ESP	José Antonio Soler
3	DF	ESP	Morros
5	DF	ESP	Checo (on loan from Cartagena B)
6	MF	ESP	Sergi Monteverde
7	FW	ESP	Juan Hernández
8	MF	ESP	Álvaro Martínez
9	FW	ESP	Andrés Carrasco (captain)
10	MF	ESP	Dani Albiar
11	FW	ESP	Álex Peque
12	DF	ESP	Jaime Escobar
13	GK	ESP	Fran Árbol (on loan from Granada B)

No.	Pos.	Nation	Player
14	FW	ESP	Jon Arruabarrena
15	DF	ETH	Fromsa
16	DF	ESP	Kiko
17	FW	ESP	José Naranjo
18	DF	ESP	Fran Tafalla
19	FW	ESP	Gabri López
20	MF	ESP	Willy Ibáñez
21	MF	SUR	Banket Dela
22	FW	BRA	William de Camargo
23	MF	ESP	Dani García
24	FW	ESP	Juanma Acevedo
