= Santa Amalia =

Coordinates: 39°01′N 6°01′W

- municipality
- Flag Coat of arms
- Interactive map of Santa Amalia
- Country: Spain
- Autonomous community: Extremadura
- Province: Badajoz

Area
  - Total: 74 km^{2} (29 sq mi)
- Elevation: 253 m (830 ft)

Population (2025-01-01)
  - Total: 3,881
  - Density: 52/km^{2} (140/sq mi)
- Time zone: UTC+1 (CET)
  - Summer (DST): UTC+2 (CEST)

Santa Amalia is a municipality located in the province of Badajoz, Extremadura, Spain. According to the 2018 census (INE), the municipality has a population of 4,059 inhabitants.

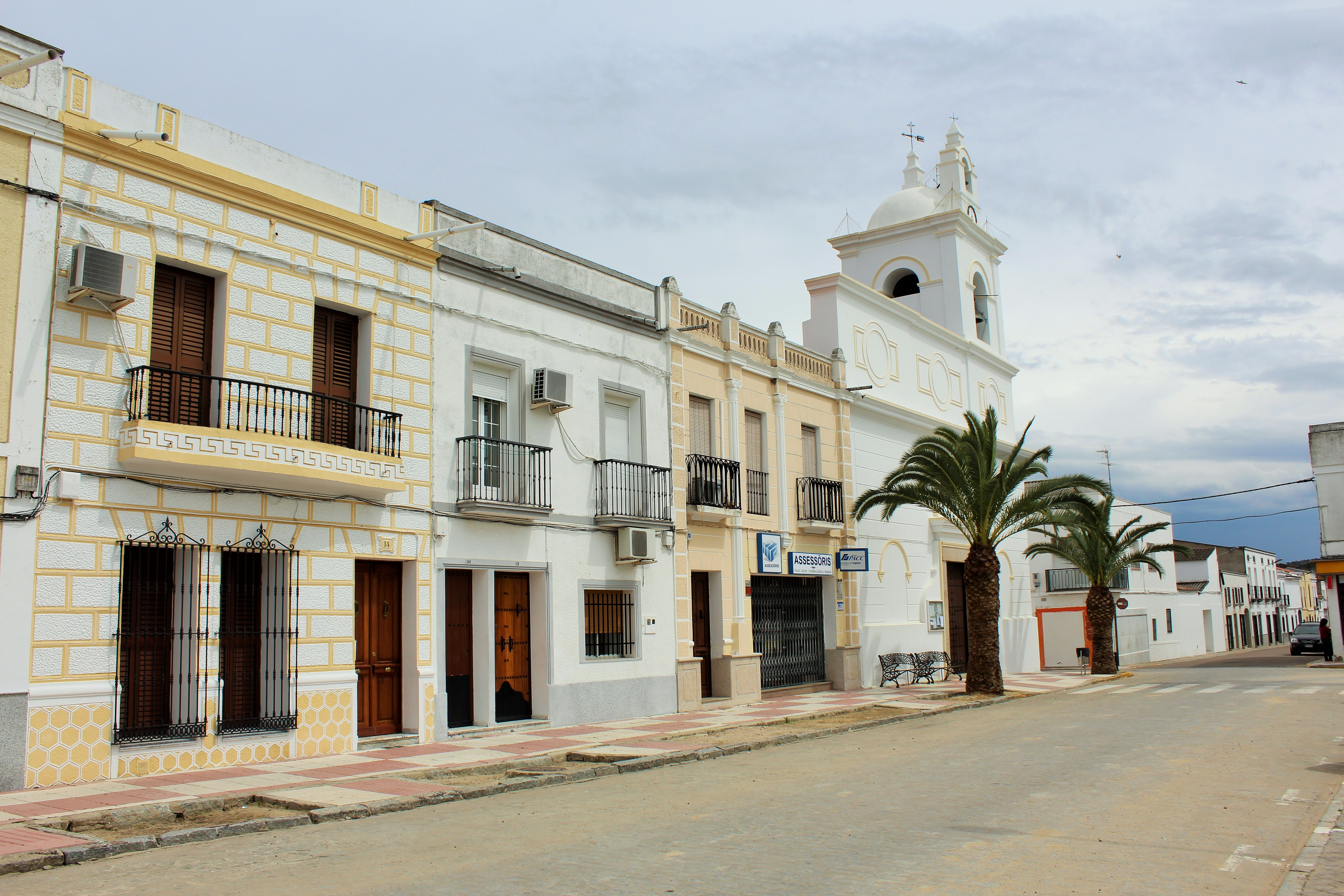
Park and parish in Santa Amalia

== See also ==
- List of municipalities in Badajoz
