= Cazalegas =

Coordinates: 40°01′N 4°40′W

- municipality
- Coat of arms

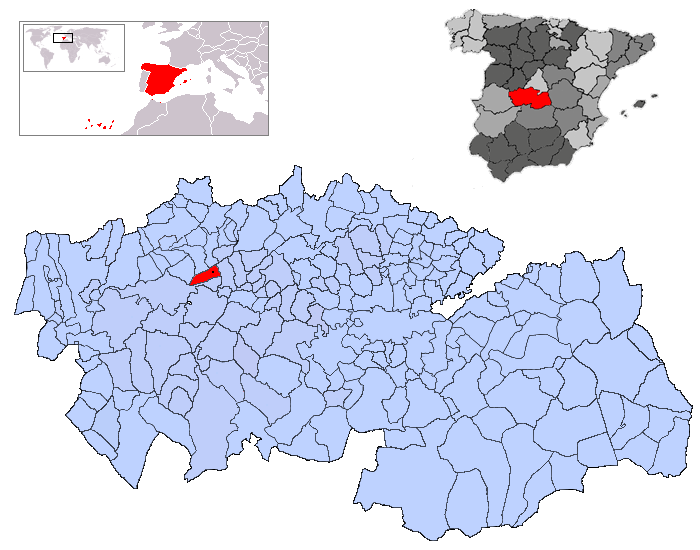
- Country: Spain
- Autonomous community: Castile-La Mancha
- Province: Toledo
- Municipality: Cazalegas

Area
  - Total: 30 km^{2} (12 sq mi)
- Elevation: 440 m (1,440 ft)

Population (2025-01-01)
  - Total: 2,195
  - Density: 73/km^{2} (190/sq mi)
- Time zone: UTC+1 (CET)
  - Summer (DST): UTC+2 (CEST)

Cazalegas is a municipality located in the west of province of Toledo, Castile-La Mancha, Spain. According to the 2025 census (INE), the municipality has a population of 2195 inhabitants.

== Demographics ==
Historical population
| Year | Pop. | ±% |
|---|---|---|
| 1900 | 638 | — |
| 1910 | 867 | +35.9% |
| 1920 | 1,063 | +22.6% |
| 1930 | 1,250 | +17.6% |
| 1940 | 1,134 | −9.3% |
| 1950 | 1,339 | +18.1% |
| 1960 | 1,533 | +14.5% |
| 1970 | 1,339 | −12.7% |
| 1981 | 1,143 | −14.6% |
| 1991 | 1,107 | −3.1% |
| 2001 | 1,178 | +6.4% |
| 2011 | 1,842 | +56.4% |
| 2021 | 1,854 | +0.7% |
| 2023 | 1,973 | +6.4% |
Source: ISTAT
