= 2017 Tercera División play-offs =

Spanish football league play-offs

The 2017 Tercera División play-offs to Segunda División B from Tercera División (Promotion play-offs) were the final playoffs for the promotion from 2016–17 Tercera División to 2017–18 Segunda División B. The first four teams in each group took part in the play-off.

== Format ==
The eighteen group winners have the opportunity to be promoted directly to Segunda División B. The eighteen group winners were drawn into a two-legged series where the nine winners will promote to Segunda División B. The nine losing clubs will enter the play-off round for the last nine promotion spots.

The eighteen runners-up were drawn against one of the eighteen fourth-placed clubs outside their group and the eighteen third-placed clubs were drawn against one another in a two-legged series. The twenty-seven winners will advance with the nine losing clubs from the champions' series to determine the eighteen teams that will enter the last two-legged series for the last nine promotion spots. In all the playoff series, the lower-ranked club play at home first. Whenever there is a tie in position (e.g. like the group winners in the champions' series or the third-placed teams in the first round), a draw determines the club to play at home first.

== Group Winners promotion play-off ==
=== Qualified teams ===
| Group | Team |
|---|---|
| 1 | Deportivo La Coruña B |
| 2 | Sporting Gijón B |
| 3 | Gimnástica Torrelavega |
| 4 | Alavés B |
| 5 | Olot |
| 6 | Olímpic |
| 7 | Atlético Madrid B |
| 8 | Gimnástica Segoviana |
| 9 | Atlético Malagueño |

| Group | Team |
|---|---|
| 10 | Real Betis B |
| 11 | Formentera |
| 12 | Las Palmas Atlético |
| 13 | Lorca Deportiva |
| 14 | Cacereño |
| 15 | Peña Sport |
| 16 | Calahorra |
| 17 | Deportivo Aragón |
| 18 | Talavera de la Reina |

=== Matches ===
| Team 1 | Agg. | Team 2 | 1st leg | 2nd leg |
|---|---|---|---|---|
| Sporting Gijón B | 1–2 | Olot | 0–1 | 1–1 |
| Deportivo Aragón | 4–1 | Calahorra | 4–1 | 0–0 |
| Olímpic | 2–3 | Talavera de la Reina | 1–0 | 1–3 |
| Formentera | 3–0 | Alavés B | 2–0 | 1–0 |
| Cacereño | 0–2 | Deportivo La Coruña B | 0–0 | 0–2 |
| Gimnástica Torrelavega | 0–3 | Atlético Madrid B | 0–1 | 0–2 |
| Atlético Malagueño | 1–4 | Gimnástica Segoviana | 1–0 | 0–4 |
| Las Palmas Atlético | 5–1 | Peña Sport | 2–1 | 3–0 |
| Real Betis B | 3–1 | Lorca Deportiva | 2–0 | 1–1 |

Promoted to Segunda División B
| Atl. Madrid B (2 years later) | Dep. Aragón (2 years later) | Deportivo B (6 years later) | Formentera (First time ever) | Gimnástica Segoviana (5 years later) | Las Palmas At. (2 years later) | Olot (One year later) | Real Betis B (One year later) | Talavera de la Reina (One year later) |

== Non-champions promotion play-off ==
=== First round ===
==== Qualified teams ====
| Group | Pos. | Team |
|---|---|---|
| 1 | 2nd | Rápido de Bouzas |
| 2 | 2nd | Avilés |
| 3 | 2nd | Tropezón |
| 4 | 2nd | Vitoria |
| 5 | 2nd | Peralada |
| 6 | 2nd | Alzira |
| 7 | 2nd | Unión Adarve |
| 8 | 2nd | Atlético Astorga |
| 9 | 2nd | Antequera |
| 10 | 2nd | Arcos |
| 11 | 2nd | Poblense |
| 12 | 2nd | UD San Fernando |
| 13 | 2nd | Lorca FC B |
| 14 | 2nd | Badajoz |
| 15 | 3rd (Note: In Group 15, CD Iruña was ranked 2nd but was ineligible as reserve team of CA Osasuna, whose first reserve team, Osasuna B plays at Segunda División B.) | Atlético Cirbonero |
| 16 | 2nd | Náxara |
| 17 | 2nd | Tarazona |
| 18 | 2nd | Conquense |

| Group | Pos. | Team |
|---|---|---|
| 1 | 3rd | Cerceda |
| 2 | 3rd | Langreo |
| 3 | 3rd | Laredo |
| 4 | 3rd | Cultural Durango |
| 5 | 3rd | Terrassa |
| 6 | 3rd | Ontinyent |
| 7 | 3rd | Alcobendas Sport |
| 8 | 3rd | Unionistas |
| 9 | 3rd | Almería B |
| 10 | 3rd | Écija |
| 11 | 3rd | Alcúdia |
| 12 | 3rd | Villa de Santa Brígida |
| 13 | 3rd | Águilas |
| 14 | 3rd | Jerez |
| 15 | 4th | Cortes |
| 16 | 3rd | SD Logroñés |
| 17 | 3rd | Utebo |
| 18 | 3rd | Villarrobledo |

| Group | Pos. | Team |
|---|---|---|
| 1 | 4th | Bergantiños |
| 2 | 4th | Tuilla |
| 3 | 4th | Cayón |
| 4 | 4th | Beasain |
| 5 | 4th | Vilafranca |
| 6 | 4th | Castellón |
| 7 | 4th | Móstoles URJC |
| 8 | 4th | Cristo Atlético |
| 9 | 4th | Huétor Tájar |
| 10 | 4th | Algeciras |
| 11 | 4th | Peña Deportiva |
| 12 | 4th | Ibarra |
| 13 | 4th | Mar Menor |
| 14 | 4th | Azuaga |
| 15 | 5th | Oberena |
| 16 | 4th | Anguiano |
| 17 | 4th | Ejea |
| 18 | 4th | Guadalajara |

=== Matches ===
| Team 1 | Agg. | Team 2 | 1st leg | 2nd leg |
|---|---|---|---|---|
| Cayón | 0–6 | Rápido de Bouzas | 0–2 | 0–4 |
| Guadalajara | 0–1 | Atlético Cirbonero | 0–0 | 0–1 |
| Vilafranca | 2–2 (a) | Unión Adarve | 2–1 | 0–1 |
| Bergantiños | 2–2 (a) | Badajoz | 2–2 | 0–0 |
| Mar Menor | 2–3 | Náxara | 1–1 | 1–2 (a.e.t.) |
| Castellón | 2–2 (a) | Poblense | 0–0 | 2–2 |
| Anguiano | 2–2 (a) | Conquense | 2–2 | 0–0 |
| Oberena | 2–2 (a) | Antequera | 2–1 | 0–1 |
| Azuaga | 0–0 (1–4 p) | Vitoria | 0–0 | 0–0 (a.e.t.) |
| Tuilla | 1–5 | UD San Fernando | 1–2 | 0–3 |
| Móstoles URJC | 0–3 | Peralada | 0–1 | 0–2 |
| Ejea | 1–3 | Arcos | 0–0 | 1–3 |
| Cristo Atlético | 3–2 | Avilés | 2–1 | 1–1 |
| Algeciras | 1–1 (3–5 p) | Atlético Astorga | 1–0 | 0–1 (a.e.t.) |
| Beasain | 5–2 | Lorca FC B | 5–0 | 0–2 |
| Huétor Tájar | 2–3 | Tarazona | 1–0 | 1–3 |
| Peña Deportiva | 2–1 | Alzira | 2–1 | 0–0 |
| Ibarra | 2–3 | Tropezón | 1–0 | 1–3 |
| Ontinyent | 2–1 | Terrassa | 1–1 | 1–0 |
| Langreo | 1–2 | Almería B | 0–1 | 1–1 |
| Cerceda | 0–0 (5–6 p) | Jerez | 0–0 | 0–0 (a.e.t.) |
| Villa de Santa Brígida | 5–2 | Alcúdia | 4–0 | 1–2 |
| Laredo | 1–1 (a) | Utebo | 0–0 | 1–1 |
| Cultural Durango | 1–1 (7–8 p) | Écija | 1–0 | 0–1 (a.e.t.) |
| Cortes | 2–4 | Villarrobledo | 2–1 | 0–3 |
| SD Logroñés | 1–1 (2–3 p) | Alcobendas Sport | 1–0 | 0–1 (a.e.t.) |
| Unionistas | 2–1 | Águilas | 1–0 | 1–1 |

=== Second round ===
==== Qualified teams ====
| Group | Pos. | Team |
|---|---|---|
| 2 | 1st | Sporting Gijón B |
| 3 | 1st | Gimnástica Torrelavega |
| 4 | 1st | Alavés B |
| 6 | 1st | Olímpic |
| 9 | 1st | Atlético Malagueño |
| 13 | 1st | Lorca Deportiva |
| 14 | 1st | Cacereño |
| 15 | 1st | Peña Sport |
| 16 | 1st | Calahorra |

| Group | Pos. | Team |
|---|---|---|
| 1 | 2nd | Rápido de Bouzas |
| 3 | 2nd | Tropezón |
| 4 | 2nd | Vitoria |
| 5 | 2nd | Peralada |
| 7 | 2nd | Unión Adarve |
| 8 | 2nd | Atlético Astorga |
| 9 | 2nd | Antequera |
| 10 | 2nd | Arcos |
| 12 | 2nd | UD San Fernando |
| 14 | 2nd | Badajoz |
| 15 | 3rd | Atlético Cirbonero |
| 16 | 2nd | Náxara |
| 17 | 2nd | Tarazona |
| 18 | 2nd | Conquense |

| Group | Pos. | Team |
|---|---|---|
| 3 | 3rd | Laredo |
| 6 | 3rd | Ontinyent |
| 7 | 3rd | Alcobendas Sport |
| 8 | 3rd | Unionistas |
| 9 | 3rd | Almería B |
| 10 | 3rd | Écija |
| 12 | 3rd | Villa de Santa Brígida |
| 14 | 3rd | Jerez |
| 18 | 3rd | Villarrobledo |

| Group | Pos. | Team |
|---|---|---|
| 4 | 4th | Beasain |
| 6 | 4th | Castellón |
| 8 | 4th | Cristo Atlético |
| 11 | 4th | Peña Deportiva |

=== Matches ===
| Team 1 | Agg. | Team 2 | 1st leg | 2nd leg |
|---|---|---|---|---|
| Beasain | 2–2 (a) | Cacereño | 1–0 | 1–2 |
| Peña Deportiva | 0–3 | Atlético Malagueño | 0–0 | 0–3 |
| Cristo Atlético | 1–1 (5–6 p) | Alavés B | 0–1 | 1–0 (a.e.t.) |
| Castellón | 4–4 (a) | Peña Sport | 4–2 | 0–2 |
| Laredo | 3–4 | Calahorra | 2–2 | 1–2 |
| Unionistas | 1–5 | Olímpic | 1–0 | 0–5 |
| Almería B | 1–2 | Sporting Gijón B | 1–0 | 0–2 |
| Alcobendas Sport | 3–1 | Gimnástica Torrelavega | 1–0 | 2–1 |
| Jerez | 1–5 | Lorca Deportiva | 1–1 | 0–4 |
| Écija | 3–3 (a) | UD San Fernando | 2–0 | 1–3 |
| Ontinyent | 2–0 | Arcos | 1–2 | 2–0 |
| Villarrobledo | 2–2 (4–5 p) | Náxara | 1–1 | 1–1 (a.e.t.) |
| Villa de Santa Brígida | 0–2 | Rápido de Bouzas | 0–1 | 0–1 |
| Tropezón | 1–5 | Atlético Astorga | 0–1 | 1–4 |
| Vitoria | 5–0 | Atlético Cirbonero | 3–0 | 2–0 |
| Unión Adarve | 3–2 | Tarazona | 2–0 | 1–2 |
| Peralada | 4–3 | Conquense | 3–0 | 1–3 |
| Antequera | 3–4 | Badajoz | 2–2 | 1–2 |

=== Third round ===
==== Qualified teams ====
| Group | Pos. | Team |
|---|---|---|
| 2 | 1st | Sporting Gijón B |
| 4 | 1st | Alavés B |
| 6 | 1st | Olímpic |
| 9 | 1st | Atlético Malagueño |
| 13 | 1st | Lorca Deportiva |
| 15 | 1st | Peña Sport |
| 16 | 1st | Calahorra |

| Group | Pos. | Team |
|---|---|---|
| 1 | 2nd | Rápido de Bouzas |
| 4 | 2nd | Vitoria |
| 5 | 2nd | Peralada |
| 7 | 2nd | Unión Adarve |
| 8 | 2nd | Atlético Astorga |
| 14 | 2nd | Badajoz |
| 16 | 2nd | Náxara |

| Group | Pos. | Team |
|---|---|---|
| 6 | 3rd | Ontinyent |
| 7 | 3rd | Alcobendas Sport |
| 10 | 3rd | Écija |

| Group | Pos. | Team |
|---|---|---|
| 4 | 4th | Beasain |

=== Matches ===
| Team 1 | Agg. | Team 2 | 1st leg | 2nd leg |
|---|---|---|---|---|
| Beasain | 4–7 | Sporting Gijón B | 2–2 | 2–5 |
| Ontinyent | 3–3 (4–2 p) | Alavés B | 3–0 | 0–3 (a.e.t.) |
| Alcobendas Sport | 2–5 | Lorca Deportiva | 1–2 | 1–3 |
| Écija | 2–2 (4–3 p) | Olímpic | 1–1 | 1–1 (a.e.t.) |
| Badajoz | 2–1 | Calahorra | 0–0 | 2–1 |
| Náxara | 2–4 | Peña Sport | 1–1 | 1–3 |
| Unión Adarve | 4–4 (a) | Atlético Malagueño | 2–0 | 2–4 |
| Vitoria | 2–2 (a) | Atlético Astorga | 1–0 | 1–2 |
| Rápido de Bouzas | 3–3 (a) | Peralada | 1–1 | 2–2 |

Promoted to Segunda División B
| Badajoz (6 years later) | Écija (3 years later) | Lorca Deportiva (First time ever) | Ontinyent (3 years later) | Peña Sport (One year later) | Rápido de Bouzas (First time ever) | Sporting Gijón B (One year later) | Unión Adarve (First time ever) | Vitoria (First time ever) |

== See also ==
- 2017 Segunda División play-offs
- 2017 Segunda División B play-offs
