= 2016–17 Tercera División =

Tercera División
- Season: 2016–17
- Biggest home win: UCAM Murcia B 11–0 Olímpico Totana (23 April 2017)
- Biggest away win: Villaralbo 0–13 Gimnástica Segoviana (10 September 2016)
- Highest scoring: Almazán 12–3 Villaralbo (14 May 2017)
- Highest attendance: 7,500; Badajoz 2–1 Antequera (11 June 2017)

The 2016–17 Tercera División was the fourth tier in Spanish football. It began on 20 August 2016 and ended on 26 June 2017 with the promotion play-off finals.

== Competition format ==
- The top four eligible teams in each group will play the promotion playoffs.
- The champion of each group will qualify to the 2017–18 Copa del Rey. If the champion is a reserve team, the first non-reserve team will qualify instead.
- In each group, at least three teams will be relegated to Regional Divisions.

== Group 1 – Galicia ==
=== Teams ===
Location of teams of the 2016–17 Tercera División Group 1

| Team | City | Home ground |
|---|---|---|
| Alondras | Cangas | O Morrazo |
| Arosa | Vilagarcía de Arousa | A Lomba |
| As Pontes | As Pontes de García Rodríguez | O Poboado |
| Barbadás | Barbadás | Os Carrís |
| Barco | O Barco de Valdeorras | Calabagueiros |
| Bergantiños | Carballo | As Eiroas |
| Castro | Castro de Rei | Municipal |
| Céltiga | A Illa de Arousa | Salvador Otero |
| Cerceda | Cerceda | O Roxo |
| Choco | Redondela | Santa Mariña |
| Compostela | Santiago de Compostela | San Lázaro |
| Deportivo La Coruña B | A Coruña | Abegondo |
| Dubra | Val do Dubra | Juan Baleato |
| Negreira | Negreira | Jesús García Calvo |
| Órdenes | Ordes | Vista Alegre |
| Racing Villalbés | Vilalba | A Magdalena |
| Rápido de Bouzas | Bouzas, Vigo | Baltasar Pujales |
| Ribadumia | Ribadumia | A Senra |
| Silva | A Coruña | A Grela |
| Villalonga | Vilalonga, Sanxenxo | San Pedro |

=== League table ===
| Pos | Team | Pld | W | D | L | GF | GA | GD | Pts | Qualification or relegation |
|---|---|---|---|---|---|---|---|---|---|---|
| 1 | Deportivo La Coruña B (O, P) | 38 | 25 | 6 | 7 | 79 | 31 | +48 | 81 | Qualification to group champions' playoffs |
| 2 | Rápido de Bouzas (O, P) | 38 | 20 | 12 | 6 | 51 | 24 | +27 | 72 | Qualification to promotion playoffs |
| 3 | Cerceda (Note: Promoted after buying the berth of Boiro, who was relegated due to unpaid debts to their players.) (P) | 38 | 21 | 8 | 9 | 65 | 36 | +29 | 71 | Qualification to promotion playoffs |
| 4 | Bergantiños | 38 | 19 | 11 | 8 | 52 | 31 | +21 | 68 | Qualification to promotion playoffs |
| 5 | Racing Villalbés | 38 | 19 | 10 | 9 | 51 | 35 | +16 | 67 | |
| 6 | Arosa | 38 | 17 | 13 | 8 | 51 | 38 | +13 | 64 | |
| 7 | Compostela | 38 | 17 | 11 | 10 | 61 | 47 | +14 | 62 | |
| 8 | Villalonga | 38 | 17 | 8 | 13 | 55 | 40 | +15 | 59 | |
| 9 | Silva | 38 | 15 | 12 | 11 | 52 | 50 | +2 | 57 | |
| 10 | Choco | 38 | 14 | 10 | 14 | 55 | 50 | +5 | 52 | |
| 11 | Barbadás | 38 | 12 | 14 | 12 | 45 | 48 | −3 | 50 | |
| 12 | Negreira | 38 | 12 | 13 | 13 | 51 | 48 | +3 | 49 | |
| 13 | Barco | 38 | 13 | 10 | 15 | 50 | 55 | −5 | 49 | |
| 14 | Alondras | 38 | 12 | 12 | 14 | 50 | 45 | +5 | 48 | |
| 15 | Ribadumia | 38 | 12 | 12 | 14 | 41 | 52 | −11 | 48 | |
| 16 | Céltiga | 38 | 13 | 8 | 17 | 42 | 45 | −3 | 47 | |
| 17 | Castro (R) | 38 | 10 | 7 | 21 | 47 | 72 | −25 | 37 | Relegation to Preferente Autonómica |
| 18 | As Pontes (R) | 38 | 6 | 10 | 22 | 32 | 67 | −35 | 28 | Relegation to Preferente Autonómica |
| 19 | Dubra (R) | 38 | 4 | 9 | 25 | 36 | 83 | −47 | 21 | Relegation to Preferente Autonómica |
| 20 | Órdenes (R) | 38 | 1 | 6 | 31 | 24 | 93 | −69 | 9 | Relegation to Preferente Autonómica |

Source: Futbolme.com
Rules for classification: 1) points; 2) head-to-head points; 3) head-to-head goal difference; 4) goal difference; 5) number of goals scored; 6) fair-play points; 7) playoff match
(O) Play-off winners; (P) Promoted; (R) Relegated
Notes:

Top goalscorers

| Goalscorers | Goals | Team |
|---|---|---|
| (Spain) Uxío Dapena | 27 | Cerceda |
| (Spain) Pinchi | 22 | Deportivo B |
| (Spain) Gerardo Carrera | 18 | Racing Villalbés |
| (Spain) Javi Pazos | 18 | Villalonga |
| (Spain) Borja Domingo | 17 | Deportivo B |

Top goalkeeper

| Goalkeeper | Goals | Matches | Average | Team |
|---|---|---|---|---|
| (Spain) Diego Vázquez | 21 | 33 | 0.64 | Rápido de Bouzas |

== Group 2 – Asturias ==
=== Teams ===
Location of confirmed teams in the 2016–17 Tercera División Group 2
Teams in Oviedo: Covadonga, Oviedo B

| Team | City | Home ground |
|---|---|---|
| Atlético Lugones | Lugones, Siero | Santa Bárbara |
| Avilés | Avilés | Román Suárez Puerta |
| Ceares | Gijón | La Cruz |
| Colunga | Colunga | Santianes |
| Condal | Noreña | Alejandro Ortea |
| Covadonga | Oviedo | Juan Antonio Álvarez Rabanal |
| L'Entregu | El Entrego, San Martín del Rey Aurelio | Nuevo Nalón |
| Langreo | La Felguera, Langreo | Ganzábal |
| Lenense | Pola de Lena, Lena | El Sotón |
| Llanera | Llanera | Pepe Quimarán |
| Llanes | Llanes | San José |
| Marino Luanco | Luanco, Gozón | Miramar |
| Mosconia | Grado | Marqués de la Vega de Anzo |
| Oviedo B | Oviedo | El Requexón |
| Praviano | Pravia | Santa Catalina |
| Siero | Pola de Siero, Siero | El Bayu |
| Sporting B | Gijón | Pepe Ortiz |
| Tineo | Tineo | San Roque |
| Tuilla | Tuilla, Langreo | El Candín |
| Urraca | Posada, Llanes | La Corredoria |

=== League table ===
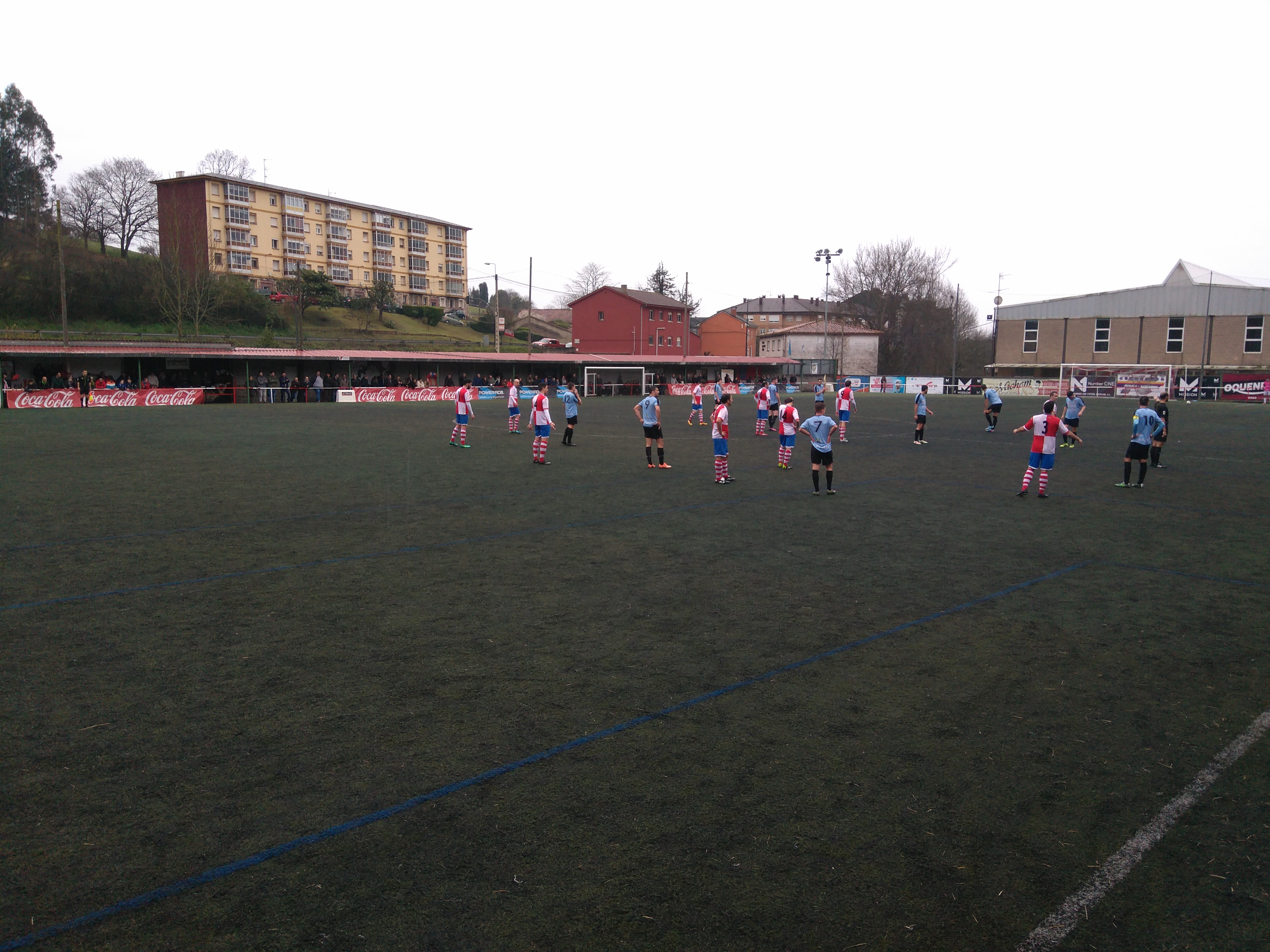
Llanera 0–1 Ceares.

| Pos | Team | Pld | W | D | L | GF | GA | GD | Pts | Qualification or relegation |
|---|---|---|---|---|---|---|---|---|---|---|
| 1 | Sporting Gijón B (O, P) | 38 | 28 | 8 | 2 | 112 | 18 | +94 | 92 | Qualification to group champions' playoffs |
| 2 | Avilés | 38 | 26 | 7 | 5 | 90 | 34 | +56 | 85 | Qualification to promotion playoffs |
| 3 | Langreo | 38 | 25 | 9 | 4 | 78 | 26 | +52 | 84 | Qualification to promotion playoffs |
| 4 | Tuilla | 38 | 26 | 6 | 6 | 61 | 35 | +26 | 84 | Qualification to promotion playoffs |
| 5 | Oviedo B | 38 | 22 | 9 | 7 | 78 | 32 | +46 | 75 | |
| 6 | Marino Luanco | 38 | 22 | 9 | 7 | 61 | 36 | +25 | 75 | |
| 7 | Covadonga | 38 | 19 | 6 | 13 | 69 | 50 | +19 | 63 | |
| 8 | Condal | 38 | 17 | 11 | 10 | 65 | 50 | +15 | 62 | |
| 9 | Ceares | 38 | 14 | 7 | 17 | 47 | 63 | −16 | 49 | |
| 10 | Llanes | 38 | 12 | 12 | 14 | 53 | 44 | +9 | 48 | |
| 11 | Colunga | 38 | 15 | 3 | 20 | 51 | 59 | −8 | 48 | |
| 12 | Mosconia | 38 | 9 | 8 | 21 | 38 | 84 | −46 | 35 | |
| 13 | Llanera | 38 | 9 | 8 | 21 | 38 | 61 | −23 | 35 | |
| 14 | Praviano | 38 | 9 | 8 | 21 | 46 | 78 | −32 | 35 | |
| 15 | L'Entregu | 38 | 8 | 9 | 21 | 27 | 66 | −39 | 33 | |
| 16 | Siero | 38 | 8 | 9 | 21 | 36 | 83 | −47 | 33 | |
| 17 | Atlético Lugones | 38 | 7 | 10 | 21 | 40 | 76 | −36 | 31 | |
| 18 | Tineo (R) | 38 | 6 | 13 | 19 | 42 | 71 | −29 | 31 | Relegation to Regional Preferente |
| 19 | Lenense (R) | 38 | 7 | 9 | 22 | 50 | 84 | −34 | 30 | Relegation to Regional Preferente |
| 20 | Urraca (R) | 38 | 6 | 9 | 23 | 32 | 64 | −32 | 27 | Relegation to Regional Preferente |

Updated to match(es) played on unknown. Source: Futbolme
Rules for classification: 1) points; 2) head-to-head points; 3) head-to-head goal difference; 4) goal difference; 5) number of goals scored; 6) fair-play points; 7) playoff match
(O) Play-off winners; (P) Promoted; (R) Relegated

Top goalscorers

| Goalscorers | Goals | Team |
|---|---|---|
| (Uruguay) Germán Fassani | 31 | Condal |
| (Spain) Claudio Medina | 28 | Sporting Gijón B |
| (Spain) Jairo Cárcaba | 27 | Marino Luanco |
| (Spain) Jorge Rodríguez | 25 | Avilés |
| (Spain) Pablo Fernández | 17 | Sporting Gijón B |

Top goalkeeper

| Goalkeeper | Goals | Matches | Average | Team |
|---|---|---|---|---|
| (Spain) Dani Martín | 14 | 30 | 0.47 | Sporting Gijón B |

== Group 3 – Cantabria ==
=== Teams ===
Location of teams of the 2016–17 Tercera División Group III
Teams in Santander: Rayo Cantabria, Racing Santander B, Atlético Albericia
Teams in Torrelavega: Barreda, Gimnástica Torrelavega, Tropezón

| Team | City | Home ground |
|---|---|---|
| Atético Albericia | Santander | Juan Hormaechea |
| Barreda | Barreda, Torrelavega | Solvay |
| Bezana | Santa Cruz de Bezana | Municipal |
| Castro | Castro Urdiales | Mioño |
| Cayón | Sarón, Santa María de Cayón | Fernando Astobiza |
| Colindres | Colindres | El Carmen |
| Escobedo | Escobedo, Camargo | Eusebio Arce |
| Gama | Bárcena de Cicero | Santa María |
| Gimnástica Torrelavega | Torrelavega | El Malecón |
| Guarnizo | Guarnizo, El Astillero | El Pilar |
| Laredo | Laredo | San Lorenzo |
| Meruelo | Meruelo | San Miguel |
| Racing Santander B | Santander | La Albericia |
| Rayo Cantabria | Santander | Mies de Cozada |
| Revilla | Revilla, Camargo | El Crucero |
| Selaya | Selaya | El Castañal |
| Siete Villas | Castillo, Arnuero | San Pedro |
| Textil Escudo | Cabezón de la Sal | Municipal |
| Tropezón | Tanos, Torrelavega | Santa Ana |
| Velarde | Muriedas, Camargo | La Maruca |
| Vimenor | Vioño de Piélagos, Piélagos | La Vidriera |

=== League table ===
| Pos | Team | Pld | W | D | L | GF | GA | GD | Pts | Qualification or relegation |
|---|---|---|---|---|---|---|---|---|---|---|
| 1 | Gimnástica Torrelavega | 38 | 28 | 6 | 4 | 78 | 23 | +55 | 90 | Qualification to group champions' playoffs |
| 2 | Tropezón | 38 | 25 | 6 | 7 | 68 | 27 | +41 | 81 | Qualification to promotion playoffs |
| 3 | Laredo | 38 | 21 | 9 | 8 | 59 | 29 | +30 | 72 | Qualification to promotion playoffs |
| 4 | Cayón | 38 | 18 | 16 | 4 | 49 | 18 | +31 | 70 | Qualification to promotion playoffs |
| 5 | Racing Santander B | 38 | 18 | 11 | 9 | 52 | 35 | +17 | 65 | |
| 6 | Siete Villas | 38 | 17 | 12 | 9 | 50 | 38 | +12 | 63 | |
| 7 | Guarnizo | 38 | 18 | 9 | 11 | 50 | 41 | +9 | 63 | |
| 8 | Barreda | 38 | 15 | 8 | 15 | 57 | 52 | +5 | 53 | |
| 9 | Escobedo | 38 | 13 | 12 | 13 | 56 | 42 | +14 | 51 | |
| 10 | Velarde | 38 | 13 | 12 | 13 | 53 | 45 | +8 | 51 | |
| 11 | Textil Escudo | 38 | 14 | 5 | 19 | 51 | 52 | −1 | 47 | |
| 12 | Bezana | 38 | 11 | 12 | 15 | 43 | 68 | −25 | 45 | |
| 13 | Atlético Albericia | 38 | 13 | 5 | 20 | 41 | 54 | −13 | 44 | |
| 14 | Selaya | 38 | 11 | 11 | 16 | 33 | 59 | −26 | 44 | |
| 15 | Vimenor | 38 | 10 | 14 | 14 | 59 | 61 | −2 | 44 | |
| 16 | Castro | 38 | 11 | 10 | 17 | 44 | 54 | −10 | 43 | |
| 17 | Rayo Cantabria | 38 | 9 | 14 | 15 | 43 | 49 | −6 | 41 | |
| 18 | Revilla (R) | 38 | 8 | 12 | 18 | 38 | 70 | −32 | 36 | Relegation to Regional Preferente |
| 19 | Meruelo (R) | 38 | 6 | 7 | 25 | 31 | 76 | −45 | 25 | Relegation to Regional Preferente |
| 20 | Colindres (R) | 38 | 2 | 7 | 29 | 23 | 85 | −62 | 13 | Relegation to Regional Preferente |

Rules for classification: 1) points; 2) head-to-head points; 3) head-to-head goal difference; 4) goal difference; 5) number of goals scored; 6) fair-play points; 7) playoff match
(R) Relegated

Top goalscorers

| Goalscorers | Goals | Team |
|---|---|---|
| (Spain) Alberto Dorronsoro | 21 | Tropezón |
| (Spain) Iván Argos | 21 | Siete Villas |
| (Spain) Óscar Briz | 15 | Gimnástica Torrelavega |
| (Spain) Jaime Isuardi | 15 | Tropezón |
| (Spain) David Vinatea | 15 | Laredo |

Top goalkeeper

| Goalkeeper | Goals | Matches | Average | Team |
|---|---|---|---|---|
| (Spain) David Puras | 12 | 30 | 0.4 | Gimnástica Torrelavega |

== Group 4 – Basque Country ==
=== Teams ===
Location of teams of the 2016–17 Tercera División Group IV
Teams in Bilbao: Deusto, Santutxu
Teams in Vitoria: Alavés B, Vitoria

| Team | City | Home ground |
|---|---|---|
| Alavés B | Vitoria | Ibaia |
| Amurrio | Amurrio | Basarte |
| Aurrera Ondarroa | Ondarroa | Zaldupe |
| Balmaseda | Balmaseda | La Baluga |
| Basconia | Basauri | López Cortázar |
| Beasain | Beasain | Loinaz |
| Bermeo | Bermeo | Itxas Gane |
| Cultural Durango | Durango | Tabira |
| Deusto | Bilbao | Etxezuri |
| Getxo | Getxo | Fadura |
| Lagun Onak | Azpeitia | Garmendipe |
| Pasaia | Pasaia | Don Bosco |
| Portugalete | Portugalete | La Florida |
| Real Sociedad C | San Sebastián | Berio |
| Santurtzi | Santurtzi | San Jorge |
| Santutxu | Bilbao | Maiona |
| Sodupe | Güeñes | Lorenzo Hurtado de Saratxo |
| Tolosa | Tolosa | Berazubi |
| Vitoria | Nanclares de la Oca | Arrate |
| Zalla | Zalla | Landaberri |

=== League table ===
| Pos | Team | Pld | W | D | L | GF | GA | GD | Pts | Qualification or relegation |
|---|---|---|---|---|---|---|---|---|---|---|
| 1 | Alavés B | 38 | 22 | 8 | 8 | 57 | 20 | +37 | 74 | Qualification to group champions' playoffs |
| 2 | Vitoria (O, P) | 38 | 22 | 6 | 10 | 60 | 39 | +21 | 72 | Qualification to promotion playoffs |
| 3 | Cultural Durango | 38 | 19 | 14 | 5 | 56 | 27 | +29 | 71 | Qualification to promotion playoffs |
| 4 | Beasain | 38 | 20 | 10 | 8 | 51 | 29 | +22 | 70 | Qualification to promotion playoffs |
| 5 | Portugalete | 38 | 18 | 15 | 5 | 56 | 39 | +17 | 69 | |
| 6 | Bermeo | 38 | 14 | 14 | 10 | 53 | 41 | +12 | 56 | |
| 7 | Deusto | 38 | 14 | 13 | 11 | 46 | 45 | +1 | 55 | |
| 8 | Santurtzi | 38 | 13 | 14 | 11 | 44 | 38 | +6 | 53 | |
| 9 | Balmaseda | 38 | 13 | 12 | 13 | 41 | 40 | +1 | 51 | |
| 10 | Basconia | 38 | 12 | 12 | 14 | 50 | 55 | −5 | 48 | |
| 11 | Sodupe | 38 | 13 | 8 | 17 | 55 | 67 | −12 | 47 | |
| 12 | Amurrio | 38 | 11 | 13 | 14 | 39 | 39 | 0 | 46 | |
| 13 | Getxo | 38 | 13 | 6 | 19 | 39 | 45 | −6 | 45 | |
| 14 | Lagun Onak | 38 | 12 | 9 | 17 | 30 | 47 | −17 | 45 | |
| 15 | Real Sociedad C | 38 | 10 | 14 | 14 | 36 | 35 | +1 | 44 | |
| 16 | Santutxu | 38 | 8 | 17 | 13 | 38 | 45 | −7 | 41 | |
| 17 | Tolosa (Note: Relegated due to the relegations of regional teams from the 2016–17 Segunda División B.) (R) | 38 | 9 | 12 | 17 | 32 | 49 | −17 | 39 | Relegation to Regional leagues |
| 18 | Aurrerá Ondarroa (R) | 38 | 9 | 11 | 18 | 27 | 54 | −27 | 38 | Relegation to Regional leagues |
| 19 | Zalla (R) | 38 | 7 | 12 | 19 | 39 | 63 | −24 | 33 | Relegation to Regional leagues |
| 20 | Pasaia (R) | 38 | 7 | 8 | 23 | 35 | 67 | −32 | 29 | Relegation to Regional leagues |

Rules for classification: 1) points; 2) head-to-head points; 3) head-to-head goal difference; 4) goal difference; 5) number of goals scored; 6) fair-play points; 7) playoff match
(O) Play-off winners; (P) Promoted; (R) Relegated
Notes:

Top goalscorers

| Goalscorers | Goals | Team |
|---|---|---|
| (Spain) Jon Ander Pérez | 17 | Beasain |
| (Spain) Íñigo Vicente | 14 | Basconia |
| (Spain) Mario Sánchez | 13 | Bermeo |
| (Spain) Íñigo Bereziartua | 13 | Tolosa |
| (Spain) Lander Guarrotxena | 12 | Getxo |

Top goalkeeper

| Goalkeeper | Goals | Matches | Average | Team |
|---|---|---|---|---|
| (Spain) Andoni Errasti | 24 | 34 | 0.71 | Durango |

== Group 5 – Catalonia ==
=== Teams ===
Location of teams of the 2016–17 Tercera División Group 5
Teams in Barcelona: Europa, Júpiter, Montañesa, Sant Andreu

| Team | City | Home ground |
|---|---|---|
| Ascó | Ascó | Municipal |
| Castelldefels | Castelldefels | El Canyar |
| Cerdanyola del Vallès | Cerdanyola del Vallès | La Bòbila-Pinetons |
| Europa | Barcelona | Nou Sardenya |
| Figueres | Figueres | Vilatenim |
| Granollers | Granollers | Carrer Girona |
| Júpiter | Barcelona | La Verneda |
| La Jonquera | La Jonquera | Municipal |
| Manlleu | Manlleu | Municipal |
| Montañesa | Barcelona | Nou Barris |
| Olot | Olot | Municipal |
| Palamós | Palamós | Palamós Costa Brava |
| Peralada | Peralada | Municipal |
| Pobla de Mafumet | La Pobla de Mafumet | Municipal |
| Sabadell B | Sabadell | Pepín Valls |
| Sant Andreu | Barcelona | Narcís Sala |
| Santfeliuenc | Sant Feliu de Llobregat | Les Grases |
| Terrassa | Terrassa | Olímpic de Terrassa |
| Vilafranca | Vilafranca del Penedès | Municipal |
| Vilassar de Mar | Vilassar de Mar | Xevi Remón |

=== League table ===
| Pos | Team | Pld | W | D | L | GF | GA | GD | Pts | Qualification or relegation |
|---|---|---|---|---|---|---|---|---|---|---|
| 1 | Olot (O, P) | 38 | 24 | 8 | 6 | 73 | 38 | +35 | 80 | Qualification to group champions' playoffs |
| 2 | Peralada (Note: Promoted after buying the berth of Gavà, who was relegated due to unpaid debts to their players.) (P) | 38 | 24 | 5 | 9 | 68 | 27 | +41 | 77 | Qualification to promotion playoffs |
| 3 | Terrassa | 38 | 19 | 9 | 10 | 48 | 26 | +22 | 66 | Qualification to promotion playoffs |
| 4 | Vilafranca | 38 | 18 | 10 | 10 | 60 | 37 | +23 | 64 | Qualification to promotion playoffs |
| 5 | Sant Andreu | 38 | 16 | 12 | 10 | 51 | 40 | +11 | 60 | |
| 6 | Ascó | 38 | 15 | 12 | 11 | 44 | 37 | +7 | 57 | |
| 7 | Pobla de Mafumet | 38 | 12 | 19 | 7 | 43 | 36 | +7 | 55 | |
| 8 | Granollers | 38 | 14 | 8 | 16 | 47 | 54 | −7 | 50 | |
| 9 | Figueres | 38 | 12 | 14 | 12 | 39 | 41 | −2 | 50 | |
| 10 | Vilassar de Mar | 38 | 13 | 11 | 14 | 40 | 44 | −4 | 50 | |
| 11 | Palamós | 38 | 13 | 10 | 15 | 49 | 55 | −6 | 49 | |
| 12 | Europa | 38 | 11 | 14 | 13 | 28 | 32 | −4 | 47 | |
| 13 | Santfeliuenc | 38 | 11 | 12 | 15 | 39 | 44 | −5 | 45 | |
| 14 | Cerdanyola del Vallès | 38 | 11 | 12 | 15 | 43 | 51 | −8 | 45 | |
| 15 | Castelldefels | 38 | 11 | 9 | 18 | 34 | 51 | −17 | 42 | |
| 16 | La Jonquera (Note: Relegated due to the relegations of regional teams from the 2016–17 Segunda División B.) (R) | 38 | 10 | 12 | 16 | 19 | 29 | −10 | 42 | Relegation to Primera Catalana |
| 17 | Montañesa (R) | 38 | 11 | 9 | 18 | 32 | 48 | −16 | 42 | Relegation to Primera Catalana |
| 18 | Manlleu (R) | 38 | 8 | 16 | 14 | 41 | 59 | −18 | 40 | Relegation to Primera Catalana |
| 19 | Júpiter (R) | 38 | 7 | 14 | 17 | 32 | 52 | −20 | 35 | Relegation to Primera Catalana |
| 20 | Sabadell B (R) | 38 | 7 | 10 | 21 | 34 | 63 | −29 | 31 | Relegation to Primera Catalana |

Rules for classification: 1) points; 2) head-to-head points; 3) head-to-head goal difference; 4) goal difference; 5) number of goals scored; 6) fair-play points; 7) playoff match
(O) Play-off winners; (P) Promoted; (R) Relegated
Notes:

Top goalscorers

| Goalscorers | Goals | Team |
|---|---|---|
| (Spain) Marc Mas | 30 | Olot |
| (Spain) Aday Benítez | 16 | Vilafranca |
| (Spain) Elhadji Bandeh | 16 | Cerdanyola del Vallès |
| (Spain) Sergio Álvarez | 14 | Olot |
| (Spain) David Corominas | 14 | Peralada |

Top goalkeeper

| Goalkeeper | Goals | Matches | Average | Team |
|---|---|---|---|---|
| (Spain) José Ortega | 26 | 38 | 0.68 | Terrassa |

== Group 6 – Valencian Community ==
=== Teams ===
Location of teams of the 2016–17 Tercera División Group 6

| Team | City | Home ground |
|---|---|---|
| Almazora | Almassora | José Manuel Pesudo |
| Almoradí | Almoradí | Sadrián |
| Alzira | Alzira | Luis Suñer Picó |
| Buñol | Buñol | Beltrán Báguena |
| Castellón | Castellón de la Plana | Castalia |
| Crevillente | Crevillent | Enrique Miralles |
| Borriol | Borriol | El Palmar |
| Elche Ilicitano | Elche | José Díaz Iborra |
| Muro | Muro de Alcoy | La Llometa |
| Novelda | Novelda | La Magdalena |
| Olímpic | Xàtiva | La Murta |
| Ontinyent | Ontinyent | El Clariano |
| Orihuela | Orihuela | Los Arcos |
| Paterna | Paterna | Gerardo Salvador |
| Rayo Ibense | Ibi | Francisco Vilaplana Mariel |
| Recambios Colón | Catarroja | Sedaví |
| Segorbe | Segorbe | El Sisterre |
| Silla | Silla | Vicente Morera |
| Torre Levante | Valencia | Municipal |
| Torrevieja | Torrevieja | Vicente García |
| Villarreal C | Villarreal | Ciudad Deportiva |

=== League table ===
| Pos | Team | Pld | W | D | L | GF | GA | GD | Pts | Qualification or relegation |
|---|---|---|---|---|---|---|---|---|---|---|
| 1 | Olímpic | 40 | 25 | 12 | 3 | 68 | 19 | +49 | 87 | Qualification to group champions' playoffs |
| 2 | Alzira | 40 | 23 | 11 | 6 | 61 | 25 | +36 | 80 | Qualification to promotion playoffs |
| 3 | Ontinyent (O, P) | 40 | 24 | 4 | 12 | 56 | 29 | +27 | 76 | Qualification to promotion playoffs |
| 4 | Castellón | 40 | 22 | 10 | 8 | 65 | 31 | +34 | 76 | Qualification to promotion playoffs |
| 5 | Orihuela | 40 | 19 | 14 | 7 | 62 | 31 | +31 | 71 | |
| 6 | Novelda | 40 | 20 | 10 | 10 | 46 | 27 | +19 | 70 | |
| 7 | Villarreal C | 40 | 19 | 12 | 9 | 67 | 47 | +20 | 69 | |
| 8 | Elche Ilicitano | 40 | 20 | 8 | 12 | 58 | 37 | +21 | 68 | |
| 9 | Torre Levante | 40 | 18 | 7 | 15 | 58 | 50 | +8 | 61 | |
| 10 | Crevillente | 40 | 15 | 13 | 12 | 39 | 37 | +2 | 58 | |
| 11 | Silla | 40 | 14 | 9 | 17 | 51 | 57 | −6 | 51 | |
| 12 | Rayo Ibense | 40 | 13 | 10 | 17 | 49 | 56 | −7 | 49 | |
| 13 | Almazora | 40 | 11 | 15 | 14 | 43 | 48 | −5 | 48 | |
| 14 | Recambios Colón | 40 | 11 | 13 | 16 | 33 | 44 | −11 | 46 | |
| 15 | Borriol | 40 | 12 | 9 | 19 | 41 | 55 | −14 | 45 | |
| 16 | Paterna | 40 | 9 | 16 | 15 | 35 | 60 | −25 | 43 | |
| 17 | Buñol | 40 | 11 | 9 | 20 | 44 | 62 | −18 | 42 | |
| 18 | Muro (R) | 40 | 10 | 9 | 21 | 39 | 50 | −11 | 39 | Relegation to Regional Preferente |
| 19 | Torrevieja (R) | 40 | 10 | 5 | 25 | 38 | 71 | −33 | 35 | Relegation to Regional Preferente |
| 20 | Almoradí (R) | 40 | 6 | 9 | 25 | 32 | 77 | −45 | 27 | Relegation to Regional Preferente |
| 21 | Segorbe (R) | 40 | 2 | 7 | 31 | 22 | 94 | −72 | 13 | Relegation to Regional Preferente |

Rules for classification: 1) points; 2) head-to-head points; 3) head-to-head goal difference; 4) goal difference; 5) number of goals scored; 6) fair-play points; 7) playoff match
(O) Play-off winners; (P) Promoted; (R) Relegated

Top goalscorers

| Goalscorers | Goals | Team |
|---|---|---|
| (Spain) Gerardo Reyes | 19 | Torre Levante |
| (Spain) Raúl González | 18 | Orihuela |
| (Spain) Marc Cosme | 16 | Olímpic |
| (Spain) David Verdú | 15 | Silla |
| (Spain) Darío Poveda | 14 | Villarreal C |

Top goalkeeper

| Goalkeeper | Goals | Matches | Average | Team |
|---|---|---|---|---|
| (Spain) Paco Fernández | 18 | 38 | 0.47 | Olímpic |

== Group 7 – Community of Madrid ==
=== Teams ===
Location of teams of the 2016–17 Tercera División Group 7
Teams in Alcorcón: Alcorcón B, Trival Valderas

| Team | City | Home ground |
|---|---|---|
| Alcalá | Alcalá de Henares | Municipal del Val |
| Alcobendas | Alcobendas | Valdelasfuentes |
| Alcobendas Sport | Alcobendas | Luis Aragonés |
| Alcorcón B | Alcorcón | Anexo de Santo Domingo |
| Aravaca | Madrid | Antonio Sanfiz |
| Atlético Madrid B | Madrid | Cerro del Espino |
| Atlético Pinto | Pinto | Amelia del Castillo |
| Getafe B | Getafe | Ciudad Deportiva |
| Internacional | Boadilla del Monte | Polideportivo Municipal |
| Leganés B | Leganés | Anexo de Butarque |
| Móstoles URJC | Móstoles | El Soto |
| Parla | Parla | Los Prados |
| Pozuelo de Alarcón | Pozuelo de Alarcón | Valle de las Cañas |
| Rayo Vallecano B | Madrid | Ciudad Deportiva |
| San Fernando de Henares | San Fernando de Henares | Santiago del Pino |
| Santa Ana | Madrid | Santa Ana |
| Trival Valderas | Alcorcón | La Canaleja |
| Unión Adarve | Madrid | Vicente del Bosque |
| Villanueva del Pardillo | Villanueva del Pardillo | Los Pinos |
| Villaverde Boetticher | Madrid | Boetticher |

=== League table ===
| Pos | Team | Pld | W | D | L | GF | GA | GD | Pts | Qualification or relegation |
|---|---|---|---|---|---|---|---|---|---|---|
| 1 | Atlético Madrid B (O, P) | 38 | 23 | 4 | 11 | 63 | 40 | +23 | 73 | Qualification to group champions' playoffs |
| 2 | Unión Adarve (O, P) | 38 | 19 | 9 | 10 | 55 | 41 | +14 | 66 | Qualification to promotion playoffs |
| 3 | Alcobendas Sport | 38 | 16 | 15 | 7 | 49 | 28 | +21 | 63 | Qualification to promotion playoffs |
| 4 | Móstoles URJC | 38 | 16 | 14 | 8 | 62 | 41 | +21 | 62 | Qualification to promotion playoffs |
| 5 | Leganés B | 38 | 18 | 8 | 12 | 57 | 45 | +12 | 62 | |
| 6 | Getafe B | 38 | 17 | 9 | 12 | 54 | 35 | +19 | 60 | |
| 7 | Atlético Pinto | 38 | 15 | 13 | 10 | 36 | 30 | +6 | 58 | |
| 8 | Alcalá | 38 | 14 | 15 | 9 | 36 | 28 | +8 | 57 | |
| 9 | Internacional | 38 | 15 | 11 | 12 | 52 | 40 | +12 | 56 | |
| 10 | Santa Ana | 38 | 15 | 8 | 15 | 43 | 54 | −11 | 53 | |
| 11 | Villaverde Boetticher | 38 | 13 | 10 | 15 | 41 | 52 | −11 | 49 | |
| 12 | San Fernando de Henares | 38 | 12 | 13 | 13 | 44 | 43 | +1 | 49 | |
| 13 | Alcorcón B | 38 | 12 | 12 | 14 | 40 | 46 | −6 | 48 | |
| 14 | Pozuelo de Alarcón | 38 | 11 | 15 | 12 | 40 | 35 | +5 | 48 | |
| 15 | Rayo Vallecano B | 38 | 12 | 11 | 15 | 57 | 49 | +8 | 47 | |
| 16 | Trival Valderas | 38 | 11 | 13 | 14 | 44 | 48 | −4 | 46 | |
| 17 | Alcobendas (R) | 38 | 10 | 14 | 14 | 29 | 37 | −8 | 44 | Relegation to Preferente |
| 18 | Aravaca (R) | 38 | 9 | 11 | 18 | 36 | 64 | −28 | 38 | Relegation to Preferente |
| 19 | Villanueva del Pardillo (R) | 38 | 7 | 10 | 21 | 21 | 57 | −36 | 31 | Relegation to Preferente |
| 20 | Parla (R) | 38 | 4 | 7 | 27 | 21 | 67 | −46 | 19 | Relegation to Preferente |

Rules for classification: 1) points; 2) head-to-head points; 3) head-to-head goal difference; 4) goal difference; 5) number of goals scored; 6) fair-play points; 7) playoff match
(O) Play-off winners; (P) Promoted; (R) Relegated

Top goalscorers

| Goalscorers | Goals | Team |
|---|---|---|
| (Spain) Álvaro Sánchez | 25 | Unión Adarve |
| (Spain) Álvaro Portero | 21 | Santa Ana |
| (Spain) Gerardo Berodia | 17 | Móstoles URJC |
| (Algeria) Zaka Boulahia | 16 | Atlético Madrid B |
| (Brazil) João Pedro | 14 | Alcobendas Sport |

Top goalkeeper

| Goalkeeper | Goals | Matches | Average | Team |
|---|---|---|---|---|
| (Spain) Juancho Lechón | 20 | 35 | 0.57 | Alcalá |

== Group 8 – Castile and León ==
=== Teams ===
Location of teams of the 2016–17 Tercera División Group 8

| Team | City | Home ground |
|---|---|---|
| Almazán | Almazán | La Arboleda |
| Atlético Astorga | Astorga | La Eragudina |
| Atlético Bembibre | Bembibre | La Devesa |
| Atlético Tordesillas | Tordesillas | Las Salinas |
| Ávila | Ávila | Adolfo Suárez |
| Bupolsa | Burgos | San Amaro |
| Burgos Promesas | Burgos | Castañares |
| Cebrereña | Cebreros | El Mancho |
| Cristo Atlético | Palencia | Nueva Balastera |
| Gimnástica Segoviana | Segovia | La Albuera |
| La Bañeza | La Bañeza | La Llanera |
| La Virgen del Camino | La Virgen del Camino | Los Dominicos |
| Mirandés B | Miranda de Ebro | Anduva |
| Numancia B | Soria | Francisco Rubio |
| San José | Garray | San Juan |
| Sporting Uxama | El Burgo de Osma | Municipal |
| Unionistas | Salamanca | Pistas del Helmántico |
| Villamuriel | Villamuriel de Cerrato | Rafael Vázquez Sedano |
| Villaralbo | Villaralbo | Ciudad Deportiva |
| Zamora | Zamora | Ruta de la Plata |

=== League table ===
| Pos | Team | Pld | W | D | L | GF | GA | GD | Pts | Qualification or relegation |
|---|---|---|---|---|---|---|---|---|---|---|
| 1 | Gimnástica Segoviana (O, P) | 38 | 28 | 7 | 3 | 97 | 22 | +75 | 91 | Qualification to group champions' playoffs |
| 2 | Atlético Astorga | 38 | 24 | 8 | 6 | 83 | 37 | +46 | 80 | Qualification to promotion playoffs |
| 3 | Unionistas | 38 | 22 | 12 | 4 | 77 | 29 | +48 | 78 | Qualification to promotion playoffs |
| 4 | Cristo Atlético | 38 | 23 | 7 | 8 | 73 | 35 | +38 | 76 | Qualification to promotion playoffs |
| 5 | Almazán | 38 | 19 | 11 | 8 | 69 | 47 | +22 | 68 | |
| 6 | Zamora | 38 | 18 | 6 | 14 | 51 | 42 | +9 | 60 | |
| 7 | Ávila | 38 | 16 | 6 | 16 | 65 | 55 | +10 | 54 | |
| 8 | Numancia B | 38 | 16 | 5 | 17 | 55 | 55 | 0 | 53 | |
| 9 | La Virgen del Camino | 38 | 13 | 11 | 14 | 56 | 56 | 0 | 50 | |
| 10 | Atlético Bembibre | 38 | 14 | 6 | 18 | 42 | 51 | −9 | 48 | |
| 11 | Bupolsa | 38 | 12 | 12 | 14 | 53 | 53 | 0 | 48 | |
| 12 | La Bañeza | 38 | 11 | 14 | 13 | 49 | 52 | −3 | 47 | |
| 13 | San José | 38 | 13 | 6 | 19 | 39 | 68 | −29 | 45 | |
| 14 | Atlético Tordesillas | 38 | 12 | 8 | 18 | 53 | 70 | −17 | 44 | |
| 15 | Burgos Promesas | 38 | 12 | 7 | 19 | 39 | 55 | −16 | 43 | |
| 16 | Cebrereña | 38 | 11 | 8 | 19 | 38 | 55 | −17 | 41 | |
| 17 | Sporting Uxama | 38 | 9 | 14 | 15 | 37 | 45 | −8 | 41 | |
| 18 | Villamuriel (R) | 38 | 10 | 7 | 21 | 35 | 49 | −14 | 37 | Relegation to Primera Regional |
| 19 | Mirandés B (R) | 38 | 8 | 13 | 17 | 26 | 49 | −23 | 37 | Relegation to Primera Regional |
| 20 | Villaralbo (R) | 38 | 3 | 4 | 31 | 27 | 139 | −112 | 13 | Relegation to Primera Regional |

Rules for classification: 1) points; 2) head-to-head points; 3) head-to-head goal difference; 4) goal difference; 5) number of goals scored; 6) fair-play points; 7) playoff match
(O) Play-off winners; (P) Promoted; (R) Relegated

Top goalscorers

| Goalscorers | Goals | Team |
|---|---|---|
| (Spain) Roberto Puente | 32 | Atlético Astorga |
| (Spain) Iban Vila | 28 | Ávila |
| (Spain) Cristo Medina | 20 | Unionistas |
| (Spain) David Terleira | 18 | Cebrereña |
| (Spain) Alfonso Gonzalo | 18 | Sporting Uxama |

Top goalkeeper

| Goalkeeper | Goals | Matches | Average | Team |
|---|---|---|---|---|
| (Uruguay) Facundo Ackerman | 21 | 33 | 0.64 | Gimnástica Segoviana |

== Group 9 – Eastern Andalusia and Melilla ==
=== Teams ===
Location of teams of the 2016–17 Tercera División Group 9
Teams in Málaga: Atlético Malagueño, El Palo, UD Dos Hermanas-San Andrés

| Team | City | Home ground |
|---|---|---|
| Alhaurín de la Torre | Alhaurín de la Torre | Los Manantiales |
| Alhaurino | Alhaurín el Grande | Miguel Fijones |
| Almería B | Almería | Anexo Juegos Mediterráneos |
| Antequera | Antequera | El Maulí |
| Atarfe Industrial | Atarfe | Municipal |
| Atlético Malagueño | Málaga | El Viso |
| Ciudad de Torredonjimeno | Torredonjimeno | Matías Prats |
| Dos Hermanas-San Andrés | Málaga | El Duende |
| El Palo | Málaga | San Ignacio |
| Guadix | Guadix | Municipal |
| Huétor Tájar | Huétor-Tájar | Miguel Moranto |
| Huétor Vega | Huétor Vega | Las Viñas |
| Loja | Loja | Medina Lauxa |
| Maracena | Maracena | Ciudad Deportiva |
| Martos | Martos | Ciudad de Martos |
| Motril | Motril | Escribano Castilla |
| River Melilla | Melilla | La Espiguera |
| Rincón | Rincón de la Victoria | Francisco Romero |
| San Pedro | San Pedro de Alcántara | Municipal |
| Vélez | Vélez-Málaga | Vivar Téllez |

=== League table ===
| Pos | Team | Pld | W | D | L | GF | GA | GD | Pts | Qualification or relegation |
|---|---|---|---|---|---|---|---|---|---|---|
| 1 | Atlético Malagueño | 38 | 28 | 6 | 4 | 107 | 34 | +73 | 90 | Qualification to group champions' playoffs |
| 2 | Antequera | 38 | 23 | 6 | 9 | 70 | 38 | +32 | 75 | Qualification to promotion playoffs |
| 3 | Almería B | 38 | 21 | 8 | 9 | 61 | 36 | +25 | 71 | Qualification to promotion playoffs |
| 4 | Huétor Tájar | 38 | 21 | 8 | 9 | 73 | 48 | +25 | 71 | Qualification to promotion playoffs |
| 5 | Motril | 38 | 21 | 7 | 10 | 71 | 43 | +28 | 70 | |
| 6 | Loja | 38 | 20 | 6 | 12 | 63 | 41 | +22 | 66 | |
| 7 | Rincón | 38 | 16 | 9 | 13 | 49 | 52 | −3 | 57 | |
| 8 | El Palo | 38 | 16 | 8 | 14 | 64 | 57 | +7 | 56 | |
| 9 | Martos | 38 | 15 | 8 | 15 | 57 | 54 | +3 | 53 | |
| 10 | Guadix | 38 | 14 | 9 | 15 | 47 | 51 | −4 | 51 | |
| 11 | San Pedro | 38 | 12 | 12 | 14 | 44 | 49 | −5 | 48 | |
| 12 | Ciudad de Torredonjimeno | 38 | 14 | 6 | 18 | 41 | 51 | −10 | 48 | |
| 13 | Maracena | 38 | 12 | 10 | 16 | 50 | 54 | −4 | 46 | |
| 14 | Atarfe Industrial | 38 | 11 | 12 | 15 | 42 | 61 | −19 | 45 | |
| 15 | Vélez | 38 | 12 | 8 | 18 | 44 | 64 | −20 | 44 | |
| 16 | Huétor Vega | 38 | 10 | 14 | 14 | 45 | 55 | −10 | 44 | |
| 17 | River Melilla (R) | 38 | 10 | 10 | 18 | 47 | 67 | −20 | 40 | Relegation to División de Honor |
| 18 | Alhaurino (R) | 38 | 7 | 10 | 21 | 37 | 67 | −30 | 31 | Relegation to División de Honor |
| 19 | Dos Hermanas-San Andrés (R) | 38 | 7 | 7 | 24 | 48 | 88 | −40 | 28 | Relegation to División de Honor |
| 20 | Alhaurín de la Torre (R) | 38 | 3 | 10 | 25 | 39 | 89 | −50 | 19 | Relegation to División de Honor |

Rules for classification: 1) points; 2) head-to-head points; 3) head-to-head goal difference; 4) goal difference; 5) number of goals scored; 6) fair-play points; 7) playoff match
(R) Relegated

Top goalscorers

| Goalscorers | Goals | Team |
|---|---|---|
| (Spain) Adrián Wojcik | 26 | Atlético Malagueño |
| (Spain) Juanillo Galdeano | 24 | Antequera |
| (Spain) Jesús Sillero | 21 | Almería B |
| (Spain) Falu Aranda | 21 | El Palo |
| (Spain) Manu Daza | 18 | Huétor Tájar |

Top goalkeeper

| Goalkeeper | Goals | Matches | Average | Team |
|---|---|---|---|---|
| (Spain) Juan Calatayud | 28 | 31 | 0.9 | Antequera |

== Group 10 – Western Andalusia and Ceuta ==
=== Teams ===
Location of teams of the 2016–17 Tercera División Group 10
Teams in Lebrija: Antoniano, Lebrijana
Teams in Seville: Betis B, Sevilla C

| Team | City | Home ground |
|---|---|---|
| Alcalá | Alcalá de Guadaira | Nuevo Estadio |
| Algeciras | Algeciras | Nuevo Mirador |
| Antoniano | Lebrija | Polideportivo Municipal |
| Arcos | Arcos de la Frontera | Antonio Barbadillo |
| Atlético Espeleño | Espiel | Municipal |
| Betis B | Seville | Luis del Sol |
| Cabecense | Las Cabezas de San Juan | Carlos Marchena |
| Castilleja | Castilleja de la Cuesta | Municipal |
| Ceuta | Ceuta | Alfonso Murube |
| Coria | Coria del Río | Guadalquivir |
| Écija | Écija | San Pablo |
| Gerena | Gerena | José Juan Romero Gil |
| Guadalcacín | Guadalcacín, Jerez de la Frontera | Municipal |
| Lebrijana | Lebrija | Polideportivo Municipal |
| Los Barrios | Los Barrios | San Rafael |
| Recreativo B | Huelva | Ciudad Deportiva |
| San Roque | San Roque | Manolo Mesa |
| San Roque de Lepe | Lepe | Ciudad de Lepe |
| Sevilla C | Seville | José Ramón Cisneros |
| Utrera | Utrera | San Juan Bosco |

=== League table ===
| Pos | Team | Pld | W | D | L | GF | GA | GD | Pts | Qualification or relegation |
|---|---|---|---|---|---|---|---|---|---|---|
| 1 | Betis B (O, P) | 38 | 24 | 6 | 8 | 81 | 35 | +46 | 78 | Qualification to group champions' playoffs |
| 2 | Arcos | 38 | 21 | 10 | 7 | 76 | 39 | +37 | 73 | Qualification to promotion playoffs |
| 3 | Écija (O, P) | 38 | 21 | 8 | 9 | 69 | 39 | +30 | 71 | Qualification to promotion playoffs |
| 4 | Algeciras | 38 | 19 | 12 | 7 | 66 | 34 | +32 | 69 | Qualification to promotion playoffs |
| 5 | San Roque de Lepe | 38 | 19 | 9 | 10 | 68 | 52 | +16 | 66 | |
| 6 | Sevilla C | 38 | 15 | 13 | 10 | 55 | 39 | +16 | 58 | |
| 7 | Atlético Espeleño | 38 | 16 | 9 | 13 | 63 | 56 | +7 | 57 | |
| 8 | Lebrijana | 38 | 15 | 11 | 12 | 45 | 48 | −3 | 56 | |
| 9 | Ceuta | 38 | 14 | 14 | 10 | 45 | 39 | +6 | 56 | |
| 10 | Utrera | 38 | 15 | 6 | 17 | 49 | 50 | −1 | 51 | |
| 11 | Gerena | 38 | 14 | 7 | 17 | 53 | 53 | 0 | 49 | |
| 12 | Los Barrios | 38 | 13 | 8 | 17 | 31 | 44 | −13 | 47 | |
| 13 | Guadalcacín | 38 | 12 | 11 | 15 | 42 | 57 | −15 | 47 | |
| 14 | Cabecense | 38 | 10 | 13 | 15 | 47 | 64 | −17 | 43 | |
| 15 | Recreativo B | 38 | 11 | 10 | 17 | 45 | 66 | −21 | 43 | |
| 16 | Castilleja | 38 | 11 | 8 | 19 | 44 | 55 | −11 | 41 | |
| 17 | Alcalá | 38 | 11 | 8 | 19 | 37 | 65 | −28 | 41 | |
| 18 | Antoniano (R) | 38 | 9 | 13 | 16 | 38 | 59 | −21 | 40 | Relegation to División de Honor |
| 19 | Coria (R) | 38 | 8 | 12 | 18 | 48 | 66 | −18 | 36 | Relegation to División de Honor |
| 20 | San Roque (R) | 38 | 5 | 6 | 27 | 37 | 79 | −42 | 21 | Relegation to División de Honor |

Rules for classification: 1) points; 2) head-to-head points; 3) head-to-head goal difference; 4) goal difference; 5) number of goals scored; 6) fair-play points; 7) playoff match
(O) Play-off winners; (P) Promoted; (R) Relegated

Top goalscorers

| Goalscorers | Goals | Team |
|---|---|---|
| (Spain) David Camps | 24 | Algeciras |
| (Spain) Ito | 21 | Atlético Espeleño |
| (Spain) Antonio Sánchez | 18 | Arcos |
| (Spain) Diego Sánchez | 16 | Atlético Espeleño |
| (Spain) Juan Delgado | 15 | Écija |

Top goalkeeper

| Goalkeeper | Goals | Matches | Average | Team |
|---|---|---|---|---|
| (Spain) Jesús Romero | 32 | 36 | 0.89 | Algeciras |

== Group 11 – Balearic Islands ==
=== Teams ===
Location of teams of the 2016–17 Tercera División Group 11
Teams in Palma: Collerense, Rotlet Molinar, Santa Catalina Atlético, Son Cladera

| Team | City | Home ground |
|---|---|---|
| Alcúdia | Alcúdia | Els Arcs |
| Binissalem | Binissalem | Miquel Pons |
| Campos | Campos | Municipal |
| Ciudad de Ibiza | Ibiza | Can Misses |
| Ciutadella | Ciutadella de Menorca | Son Marçal |
| Collerense | Palma | Ca'n Caimari |
| Constància | Inca | Municipal |
| Esporles | Esporles | Son Quint |
| Felanitx | Felanitx | Es Torrentó |
| Ferriolense | Son Ferriol | Municipal |
| Formentera | Sant Francesc Xavier | Municipal |
| Llosetense | Lloseta | Municipal |
| Mercadal | Es Mercadal | San Martí |
| Platges de Calvià | Calvià | Municipal de Magaluf |
| Peña Deportiva | Santa Eulària des Riu | Municipal |
| Poblense | Sa Pobla | Nou Camp |
| Rotlet Molinar | Palma | Rotlet Molinar |
| Sant Rafel | Sant Rafel | Municipal |
| Santa Catalina Atlético | Palma | Son Flo |
| Son Cladera | Palma | Son Cladera |

=== League table ===
| Pos | Team | Pld | W | D | L | GF | GA | GD | Pts | Qualification or relegation |
|---|---|---|---|---|---|---|---|---|---|---|
| 1 | Formentera (O, P) | 38 | 26 | 8 | 4 | 88 | 19 | +69 | 86 | Qualification to group champions' playoffs |
| 2 | Poblense | 38 | 24 | 7 | 7 | 90 | 34 | +56 | 79 | Qualification to promotion playoffs |
| 3 | Alcúdia | 38 | 24 | 5 | 9 | 55 | 30 | +25 | 77 | Qualification to promotion playoffs |
| 4 | Peña Deportiva (Note: Peña Deportiva was promoted to Segunda División B replacing Mallorca B.) (P) | 38 | 21 | 11 | 6 | 63 | 35 | +28 | 74 | Qualification to promotion playoffs |
| 5 | Llosetense | 38 | 20 | 9 | 9 | 73 | 42 | +31 | 69 | |
| 6 | Sant Rafel | 38 | 18 | 12 | 8 | 52 | 28 | +24 | 66 | |
| 7 | Platges de Calvià | 38 | 18 | 8 | 12 | 55 | 39 | +16 | 62 | |
| 8 | Constància | 38 | 14 | 9 | 15 | 53 | 49 | +4 | 51 | |
| 9 | Binissalem | 38 | 12 | 14 | 12 | 47 | 38 | +9 | 50 | |
| 10 | Santa Catalina Atlético | 38 | 14 | 8 | 16 | 44 | 55 | −11 | 50 | |
| 11 | Ciudad de Ibiza (Note: Ciudad de Ibiza resigned to continue playing in Tercera División for starting the merge with UD Ibiza.) (R) | 38 | 12 | 13 | 13 | 54 | 55 | −1 | 49 | Relegation to Primera Regional Preferente |
| 12 | Ferriolense | 38 | 13 | 10 | 15 | 54 | 68 | −14 | 49 | |
| 13 | Felanitx | 38 | 12 | 11 | 15 | 39 | 49 | −10 | 47 | |
| 14 | Son Cladera | 38 | 11 | 8 | 19 | 37 | 67 | −30 | 41 | |
| 15 | Esporles | 38 | 9 | 13 | 16 | 40 | 56 | −16 | 40 | |
| 16 | Mercadal | 38 | 11 | 6 | 21 | 44 | 55 | −11 | 39 | |
| 17 | Collerense | 38 | 10 | 9 | 19 | 50 | 63 | −13 | 39 | |
| 18 | Rotlet Molinar (R) | 38 | 9 | 5 | 24 | 40 | 98 | −58 | 32 | Relegation to Primera Regional Preferente |
| 19 | Ciutadella (R) | 38 | 6 | 10 | 22 | 34 | 83 | −49 | 28 | Relegation to Primera Regional Preferente |
| 20 | Campos (R) | 38 | 5 | 6 | 27 | 28 | 77 | −49 | 21 | Relegation to Primera Regional Preferente |

Rules for classification: 1) points; 2) head-to-head points; 3) head-to-head goal difference; 4) goal difference; 5) number of goals scored; 6) fair-play points; 7) playoff match
(O) Play-off winners; (P) Promoted; (R) Relegated
Notes:

Top goalscorers

| Goalscorers | Goals | Team |
|---|---|---|
| (Spain) Aitor Pons | 33 | Poblense |
| (Spain) Juan Antonio Sánchez | 26 | Formentera |
| (Spain) Jaume Pascual | 20 | Llosetense |
| (Spain) Rubio | 17 | Santa Catalina Atlético |
| (Spain) Diego Piquero | 16 | Peña Deportiva |

Top goalkeeper

| Goalkeeper | Goals | Matches | Average | Team |
|---|---|---|---|---|
| (Spain) Marcos Contreras | 15 | 35 | 0.43 | Formentera |

== Group 12 – Canary Islands ==
=== Teams ===
Location of teams of the 2016–17 Tercera División Group 12
Teams in Las Palmas: Las Palmas Atlético, Unión Viera

| Team | City | Home ground |
|---|---|---|
| Arucas | Arucas | Tonono |
| Buzanada | Buzanada, Arona | Clementina de Bello |
| El Cotillo | La Oliva | Municipal |
| Estrella | Santa Lucía de Tirajana | Las Palmitas |
| Ibarra | Las Galletas, Arona | Villa Isabel |
| Lanzarote | Arrecife | Ciudad Deportiva |
| Las Palmas Atlético | Las Palmas | Anexo Gran Canaria |
| Las Zocas | San Miguel de Abona | Juanito Marrero |
| Marino | Los Cristianos, Arona | Antonio Domínguez |
| Panadería Pulido | Vega de San Mateo | San Mateo |
| UD San Fernando | San Bartolomé de Tirajana | Ciudad Deportiva |
| Santa Úrsula | Santa Úrsula | Argelio Tabares |
| Telde | Telde | Pablo Hernández |
| Tenerife B | Santa Cruz de Tenerife | Centro Insular |
| Tenisca | Santa Cruz de La Palma | Virgen de las Nieves |
| La Cuadra-Unión Puerto | Puerto del Rosario | Municipal de Los Pozos |
| Unión Sur Yaiza | Yaiza | Municipal |
| Unión Viera | Las Palmas | Pepe Gonçalvez |
| Vera | Puerto de la Cruz | Salvador Ledesma |
| Villa de Santa Brígida | Santa Brígida | El Guiniguada |

=== League table ===
| Pos | Team | Pld | W | D | L | GF | GA | GD | Pts | Qualification or relegation |
|---|---|---|---|---|---|---|---|---|---|---|
| 1 | Las Palmas Atlético (O, P) | 38 | 29 | 7 | 2 | 92 | 20 | +72 | 94 | Qualification to group champions' playoffs |
| 2 | UD San Fernando | 38 | 18 | 12 | 8 | 54 | 38 | +16 | 66 | Qualification to promotion playoffs |
| 3 | Villa de Santa Brígida | 38 | 18 | 11 | 9 | 64 | 44 | +20 | 65 | Qualification to promotion playoffs |
| 4 | Ibarra | 38 | 19 | 8 | 11 | 61 | 41 | +20 | 65 | Qualification to promotion playoffs |
| 5 | Tenerife B | 38 | 15 | 11 | 12 | 57 | 42 | +15 | 56 | |
| 6 | Marino | 38 | 15 | 11 | 12 | 51 | 45 | +6 | 56 | |
| 7 | Unión Sur Yaiza | 38 | 16 | 7 | 15 | 55 | 44 | +11 | 55 | |
| 8 | Panadería Pulido | 38 | 14 | 13 | 11 | 52 | 49 | +3 | 55 | |
| 9 | La Cuadra-Unión Puerto | 38 | 13 | 12 | 13 | 45 | 50 | −5 | 51 | |
| 10 | Buzanada | 38 | 13 | 12 | 13 | 45 | 48 | −3 | 51 | |
| 11 | Tenisca | 38 | 14 | 9 | 15 | 66 | 70 | −4 | 51 | |
| 12 | Lanzarote | 38 | 11 | 16 | 11 | 53 | 60 | −7 | 49 | |
| 13 | Las Zocas | 38 | 14 | 6 | 18 | 43 | 56 | −13 | 48 | |
| 14 | El Cotillo | 38 | 13 | 8 | 17 | 62 | 64 | −2 | 47 | |
| 15 | Estrella | 38 | 12 | 10 | 16 | 40 | 42 | −2 | 46 | |
| 16 | Santa Úrsula | 38 | 11 | 11 | 16 | 54 | 61 | −7 | 44 | |
| 17 | Vera | 38 | 11 | 11 | 16 | 44 | 60 | −16 | 44 | |
| 18 | Unión Viera (R) | 38 | 12 | 6 | 20 | 57 | 80 | −23 | 42 | Relegation to Interinsular Preferente |
| 19 | Arucas (R) | 38 | 9 | 10 | 19 | 41 | 58 | −17 | 37 | Relegation to Interinsular Preferente |
| 20 | Telde (R) | 38 | 5 | 5 | 28 | 22 | 86 | −64 | 20 | Relegation to Interinsular Preferente |

Rules for classification: 1) points; 2) head-to-head points; 3) head-to-head goal difference; 4) goal difference; 5) number of goals scored; 6) fair-play points; 7) playoff match
(O) Play-off winners; (P) Promoted; (R) Relegated

Top goalscorers

| Goalscorers | Goals | Team |
|---|---|---|
| (Spain) Dani López | 26 | Tenisca |
| (Uruguay) Pedro Manzi | 22 | Ibarra |
| (Spain) Álex Yunes | 21 | Unión Sur Yaiza |
| (Spain) Erik Expósito | 20 | Las Palmas Atlético |
| (Spain) Jonathan Quintero | 20 | Lanzarote |

Top goalkeeper

| Goalkeeper | Goals | Matches | Average | Team |
|---|---|---|---|---|
| (Spain) Álex Guanche | 17 | 31 | 0.55 | Las Palmas Atlético |

== Group 13 – Region of Murcia ==
=== Teams ===
Location of teams of the 2016–17 Tercera División Group 13
Teams in Murcia: Ciudad de Murcia, Murcia Imperial

| Team | City | Home ground |
|---|---|---|
| Águilas | Águilas | El Rubial |
| Algar | El Algar, Cartagena | Sánchez Luengo |
| Atlético Pulpileño | Pulpí | San Miguel |
| Cieza | Cieza | La Arboleja |
| Ciudad de Murcia | Murcia | José Barnés |
| Churra | Churra, Murcia | Municipal |
| Deportiva Minera | Llano del Beal, Cartagena | Ángel Cedrán |
| El Palmar | El Palmar, Murcia | Municipal |
| Estudiantes | Alcantarilla | Ángel Sornichero |
| Huércal-Overa | Huércal-Overa | El Hornillo |
| La Unión | La Unión | Municipal |
| Lorca Deportiva | Lorca | Francisco Artés Carrasco |
| Lorca FC B | La Hoya, Lorca | Los Tollos |
| Mar Menor | San Javier | Pitín |
| Muleño | Mula | Municipal |
| Olímpico Totana | Totana | Juan Cayuela |
| Murcia Imperial | Murcia | Campus Universitario |
| Pinatar Arena | San Pedro del Pinatar | José Antonio Pérez |
| UCAM Murcia B | Sangonera la Verde | El Mayayo |
| Yeclano | Yecla | La Constitución |

=== League table ===
| Pos | Team | Pld | W | D | L | GF | GA | GD | Pts | Qualification or relegation |
|---|---|---|---|---|---|---|---|---|---|---|
| 1 | Lorca Deportiva (O, P) | 38 | 27 | 4 | 7 | 96 | 38 | +58 | 85 | Qualification to group champions' playoffs |
| 2 | Lorca FC B | 38 | 26 | 7 | 5 | 87 | 34 | +53 | 85 | Qualification to promotion playoffs |
| 3 | Águilas | 38 | 24 | 9 | 5 | 78 | 30 | +48 | 81 | Qualification to promotion playoffs |
| 4 | Mar Menor | 38 | 19 | 10 | 9 | 54 | 27 | +27 | 67 | Qualification to promotion playoffs |
| 5 | Yeclano | 38 | 19 | 8 | 11 | 61 | 38 | +23 | 65 | |
| 6 | Murcia Imperial | 38 | 15 | 14 | 9 | 67 | 44 | +23 | 59 | |
| 7 | El Palmar Estrella Grana | 38 | 15 | 13 | 10 | 54 | 48 | +6 | 58 | |
| 8 | UCAM Murcia B | 38 | 17 | 4 | 17 | 71 | 51 | +20 | 55 | |
| 9 | Estudiantes | 38 | 15 | 8 | 15 | 58 | 52 | +6 | 53 | |
| 10 | La Unión | 38 | 14 | 10 | 14 | 47 | 54 | −7 | 52 | |
| 11 | Cieza | 38 | 15 | 7 | 16 | 58 | 66 | −8 | 52 | |
| 12 | Atlético Pulpileño | 38 | 13 | 10 | 15 | 50 | 55 | −5 | 49 | |
| 13 | Huércal-Overa | 38 | 12 | 7 | 19 | 40 | 59 | −19 | 43 | |
| 14 | Churra | 38 | 11 | 9 | 18 | 53 | 57 | −4 | 42 | |
| 15 | Muleño | 38 | 10 | 12 | 16 | 44 | 60 | −16 | 42 | |
| 16 | Deportiva Minera | 38 | 10 | 11 | 17 | 40 | 56 | −16 | 41 | |
| 17 | Pinatar Arena | 38 | 9 | 12 | 17 | 39 | 47 | −8 | 39 | |
| 18 | Ciudad de Murcia (R) | 38 | 11 | 4 | 23 | 41 | 63 | −22 | 37 | Relegation to Preferente Autonómica |
| 19 | Algar (R) | 38 | 9 | 6 | 23 | 39 | 68 | −29 | 33 | Relegation to Preferente Autonómica |
| 20 | Olímpico Totana (R) | 38 | 4 | 5 | 29 | 27 | 157 | −130 | 17 | Relegation to Preferente Autonómica |

Rules for classification: 1) points; 2) head-to-head points; 3) head-to-head goal difference; 4) goal difference; 5) number of goals scored; 6) fair-play points; 7) playoff match
(O) Play-off winners; (P) Promoted; (R) Relegated

Top goalscorers

| Goalscorers | Goals | Team |
|---|---|---|
| (Spain) Andrés Carrasco | 39 | Lorca Deportiva |
| (Nigeria) Manu Apeh | 21 | Lorca FC B |
| (Spain) Ismael García | 20 | Nueva Vanguardia |
| (Spain) Juanma Acevedo | 19 | Águilas |
| (Spain) Adrián Fuentes | 18 | Lorca FC B |

Top goalkeeper

| Goalkeeper | Goals | Matches | Average | Team |
|---|---|---|---|---|
| (Spain) Miguel Serna | 27 | 38 | 0.71 | Mar Menor |

== Group 14 – Extremadura ==
=== Teams ===
Location of teams of the 2016–17 Tercera División Group 14

| Team | City | Home ground |
|---|---|---|
| Amanecer | Sierra de Fuentes | San Isidro |
| Arroyo | Arroyo de la Luz | Municipal |
| Atlético Pueblonuevo | Pueblonuevo del Guadiana | Antonio Amaya |
| Azuaga | Azuaga | Municipal |
| Badajoz | Badajoz | Nuevo Vivero |
| Cacereño | Cáceres | Príncipe Felipe |
| Calamonte | Calamonte | Municipal |
| Coria | Coria | La Isla |
| Díter Zafra | Zafra | Nuevo Estadio |
| Don Benito | Don Benito | Vicente Sanz |
| Extremadura San José | Almendralejo | Tomás de la Hera |
| Fuente de Cantos | Fuente de Cantos | Francisco de Zurbarán |
| Jerez | Jerez de los Caballeros | Manuel Calzado Galván |
| La Estrella | Los Santos de Maimona | Cipriano Tinoco |
| Montijo | Montijo | Municipal |
| Moralo | Navalmoral de la Mata | Municipal |
| Olivenza | Olivenza | Municipal |
| Plasencia | Plasencia | Ciudad Deportiva |
| Santa Amalia | Santa Amalia | Municipal |
| Valdivia | Valdivia, Villanueva de la Serena | Primero de Mayo |

=== League table ===
| Pos | Team | Pld | W | D | L | GF | GA | GD | Pts | Qualification or relegation |
|---|---|---|---|---|---|---|---|---|---|---|
| 1 | Cacereño | 38 | 29 | 5 | 4 | 81 | 16 | +65 | 92 | Qualification to group champions' playoffs |
| 2 | Badajoz (O, P) | 38 | 25 | 10 | 3 | 90 | 17 | +73 | 85 | Qualification to promotion playoffs |
| 3 | Jerez | 38 | 25 | 4 | 9 | 58 | 26 | +32 | 79 | Qualification to promotion playoffs |
| 4 | Azuaga | 38 | 22 | 8 | 8 | 83 | 42 | +41 | 74 | Qualification to promotion playoffs |
| 5 | Coria | 38 | 22 | 6 | 10 | 62 | 29 | +33 | 72 | |
| 6 | Don Benito | 38 | 18 | 14 | 6 | 62 | 26 | +36 | 68 | |
| 7 | Calamonte | 38 | 16 | 14 | 8 | 70 | 39 | +31 | 62 | |
| 8 | Plasencia | 38 | 17 | 8 | 13 | 59 | 56 | +3 | 59 | |
| 9 | Moralo | 38 | 13 | 13 | 12 | 57 | 58 | −1 | 52 | |
| 10 | Olivenza | 38 | 12 | 11 | 15 | 44 | 54 | −10 | 47 | |
| 11 | Montijo | 38 | 11 | 10 | 17 | 41 | 59 | −18 | 43 | |
| 12 | Amanecer | 38 | 10 | 13 | 15 | 52 | 58 | −6 | 43 | |
| 13 | Extremadura San José | 38 | 9 | 13 | 16 | 49 | 55 | −6 | 40 | |
| 14 | Valdivia | 38 | 9 | 12 | 17 | 34 | 62 | −28 | 39 | |
| 15 | Arroyo | 38 | 10 | 7 | 21 | 31 | 64 | −33 | 37 | |
| 16 | Santa Amalia | 38 | 10 | 6 | 22 | 34 | 82 | −48 | 36 | |
| 17 | Atlético Pueblonuevo | 38 | 8 | 11 | 19 | 34 | 64 | −30 | 35 | |
| 18 | Fuente de Cantos (R) | 38 | 8 | 10 | 20 | 42 | 69 | −27 | 34 | Relegation to Regional Preferente |
| 19 | Díter Zafra (R) | 38 | 6 | 6 | 26 | 34 | 95 | −61 | 24 | Relegation to Regional Preferente |
| 20 | La Estrella (R) | 38 | 3 | 13 | 22 | 34 | 79 | −45 | 22 | Relegation to Regional Preferente |

Rules for classification: 1) points; 2) head-to-head points; 3) head-to-head goal difference; 4) goal difference; 5) number of goals scored; 6) fair-play points; 7) playoff match
(O) Play-off winners; (P) Promoted; (R) Relegated

Top goalscorers

| Goalscorers | Goals | Team |
|---|---|---|
| (Spain) Juanma Barbero | 20 | Moralo |
| (Spain) Gabri Ortega | 19 | Badajoz |
| (Spain) Luismi Álvarez | 19 | Plasencia |
| (Argentina) Kevin Levis | 18 | Cacereño |
| (Spain) Joselu Muñoz | 18 | Badajoz |

Top goalkeeper

| Goalkeeper | Goals | Matches | Average | Team |
|---|---|---|---|---|
| (Spain) José Manuel Camacho | 15 | 35 | 0.43 | Cacereño |

== Group 15 – Navarre ==
=== Teams ===
Location of teams of the 2016–17 Tercera División Group 15
Teams in Pamplona: Txantrea, Iruña, Oberena, Pamplona, San Juan

| Team | City | Home ground |
|---|---|---|
| Ardoi | Zizur Mayor | El Pinar |
| Atlético Cirbonero | Cintruénigo | San Juan |
| Burladés | Burlada | Ripagaina |
| Cantolagua | Sangüesa | Cantolagua |
| Corellano | Corella | José Luis de Arrese |
| Cortes | Cortes | San Francisco Javier |
| Erriberri | Olite | San Miguel |
| Huarte | Huarte/Uharte | Areta |
| Idoya | Oteiza | Iturtxipia |
| Iruña | Pamplona | Orkoien |
| Lourdes | Tudela | Luis Asarta |
| Peña Sport | Tafalla | San Francisco |
| Oberena | Pamplona | Oberena |
| Pamplona | Pamplona | Bidezarra |
| River Ega | Andosilla | Andola |
| San Juan | Pamplona | San Juan |
| Subiza | Subiza | Sotoburu |
| Txantrea | Pamplona | Txantrea |
| Valle de Egüés | Egüés | Sarriguren |
| Valtierrano | Valtierra | Las Tejerías |

=== League table ===
| Pos | Team | Pld | W | D | L | GF | GA | GD | Pts | Qualification or relegation |
|---|---|---|---|---|---|---|---|---|---|---|
| 1 | Peña Sport (O, P) | 38 | 25 | 7 | 6 | 73 | 35 | +38 | 82 | Qualification to group champions' playoffs |
| 2 | Iruña | 38 | 24 | 7 | 7 | 66 | 32 | +34 | 79 | |
| 3 | Atlético Cirbonero | 38 | 23 | 8 | 7 | 65 | 30 | +35 | 77 | Qualification to promotion playoffs |
| 4 | Cortes | 38 | 19 | 7 | 12 | 51 | 35 | +16 | 64 | Qualification to promotion playoffs |
| 5 | Oberena | 38 | 19 | 6 | 13 | 54 | 45 | +9 | 63 | Qualification to promotion playoffs |
| 6 | San Juan | 38 | 16 | 14 | 8 | 60 | 42 | +18 | 62 | |
| 7 | Burladés | 38 | 15 | 14 | 9 | 51 | 50 | +1 | 59 | |
| 8 | Idoya | 38 | 17 | 6 | 15 | 51 | 47 | +4 | 57 | |
| 9 | Huarte | 38 | 13 | 13 | 12 | 39 | 36 | +3 | 52 | |
| 10 | Txantrea | 38 | 14 | 10 | 14 | 63 | 56 | +7 | 52 | |
| 11 | Subiza | 38 | 14 | 8 | 16 | 65 | 62 | +3 | 50 | |
| 12 | Cantolagua | 38 | 14 | 7 | 17 | 44 | 47 | −3 | 49 | |
| 13 | Valle de Egüés | 38 | 12 | 9 | 17 | 51 | 49 | +2 | 45 | |
| 14 | River Ega | 38 | 14 | 3 | 21 | 52 | 77 | −25 | 45 | |
| 15 | Pamplona | 38 | 11 | 11 | 16 | 47 | 52 | −5 | 44 | |
| 16 | Corellano | 38 | 11 | 11 | 16 | 49 | 56 | −7 | 44 | |
| 17 | Ardoi | 38 | 11 | 11 | 16 | 39 | 46 | −7 | 44 | |
| 18 | Lourdes (R) | 38 | 10 | 10 | 18 | 37 | 56 | −19 | 40 | Relegation to Regional Preferente |
| 19 | Erriberri (R) | 38 | 7 | 8 | 23 | 27 | 69 | −42 | 29 | Relegation to Regional Preferente |
| 20 | Valtierrano (R) | 38 | 2 | 8 | 28 | 30 | 92 | −62 | 14 | Relegation to Regional Preferente |

Rules for classification: 1) points; 2) head-to-head points; 3) head-to-head goal difference; 4) goal difference; 5) number of goals scored; 6) fair-play points; 7) playoff match
(O) Play-off winners; (P) Promoted; (R) Relegated

Top goalscorers

| Goalscorers | Goals | Team |
|---|---|---|
| (Spain) Mariano Azcona | 24 | River Ega |
| (Spain) Isaac Sanz | 22 | Corellano |
| (Spain) Rodrigo Sanz | 20 | Atlético Cirbonero |
| (Spain) Eneko Viana | 20 | Idoya |
| (Spain) Ander Iriguibel | 18 | San Juan |

Top goalkeeper

| Goalkeeper | Goals | Matches | Average | Team |
|---|---|---|---|---|
| (Spain) Santi Navarro | 27 | 30 | 0.9 | Cortes |

== Group 16 – La Rioja ==
=== Teams ===
Location of teams of the 2013–14 Tercera División Group 16
Teams in Logroño: Calasancio, SD Logroñés, UD Logroñés Promesas, Varea, Villegas

| Team | City | Home ground |
|---|---|---|
| Agoncillo | Agoncillo | San Roque |
| Alfaro | Alfaro | La Molineta |
| Anguiano | Anguiano | Isla |
| Arnedo | Arnedo | Sendero |
| Atlético Vianés | Viana | Municipal |
| Calahorra | Calahorra | La Planilla |
| Calasancio | Logroño | La Estrella |
| Casalarreina | Casalarreina | El Soto |
| Haro | Haro | El Mazo |
| La Calzada | Santo Domingo de la Calzada | El Rollo |
| Náxara | Nájera | La Salera |
| Oyonesa | Oyón | El Espinar |
| Rápid Murillo | Murillo de Río Leza | El Rozo |
| River Ebro | Rincón de Soto | San Miguel |
| San Marcial | Lardero | Ángel de Vicente |
| SD Logroñés | Logroño | Las Gaunas |
| Tedeón | Navarrete | San Miguel |
| UD Logroñés Promesas | Logroño | Mundial 82 |
| Varea | Logroño | Municipal |
| Villegas | Logroño | La Ribera |

=== League table ===
| Pos | Team | Pld | W | D | L | GF | GA | GD | Pts | Qualification or relegation |
|---|---|---|---|---|---|---|---|---|---|---|
| 1 | Calahorra | 38 | 30 | 5 | 3 | 116 | 20 | +96 | 95 | Qualification to group champions' playoffs |
| 2 | Náxara | 38 | 28 | 7 | 3 | 117 | 30 | +87 | 91 | Qualification to promotion playoffs |
| 3 | SD Logroñés | 38 | 29 | 4 | 5 | 110 | 25 | +85 | 91 | Qualification to promotion playoffs |
| 4 | Anguiano | 38 | 29 | 4 | 5 | 115 | 40 | +75 | 91 | Qualification to promotion playoffs |
| 5 | Haro | 38 | 28 | 7 | 3 | 115 | 33 | +82 | 91 | |
| 6 | Varea | 38 | 28 | 4 | 6 | 95 | 28 | +67 | 88 | |
| 7 | Alfaro | 38 | 24 | 3 | 11 | 78 | 56 | +22 | 75 | |
| 8 | UD Logroñés Promesas | 38 | 20 | 5 | 13 | 64 | 45 | +19 | 65 | |
| 9 | Agoncillo | 38 | 13 | 6 | 19 | 50 | 60 | −10 | 45 | |
| 10 | Oyonesa | 38 | 11 | 6 | 21 | 45 | 74 | −29 | 39 | |
| 11 | Atlético Vianés | 38 | 12 | 2 | 24 | 46 | 114 | −68 | 38 | |
| 12 | River Ebro | 38 | 10 | 8 | 20 | 50 | 81 | −31 | 38 | |
| 13 | Tedeón | 38 | 9 | 10 | 19 | 43 | 68 | −25 | 37 | |
| 14 | Arnedo | 38 | 8 | 11 | 19 | 39 | 67 | −28 | 35 | |
| 15 | Casalarreina | 38 | 9 | 6 | 23 | 42 | 78 | −36 | 33 | |
| 16 | Villegas | 38 | 9 | 6 | 23 | 37 | 85 | −48 | 33 | |
| 17 | Calasancio | 38 | 8 | 7 | 23 | 24 | 77 | −53 | 31 | |
| 18 | La Calzada (R) | 38 | 8 | 5 | 25 | 35 | 84 | −49 | 29 | Relegation to Regional Preferente |
| 19 | San Marcial (R) | 38 | 5 | 7 | 26 | 44 | 110 | −66 | 22 | Relegation to Regional Preferente |
| 20 | Rápid Murillo (R) | 38 | 2 | 7 | 29 | 24 | 114 | −90 | 13 | Relegation to Regional Preferente |

Rules for classification: 1) points; 2) head-to-head points; 3) head-to-head goal difference; 4) goal difference; 5) number of goals scored; 6) fair-play points; 7) playoff match
(R) Relegated

Top goalscorers

| Goalscorers | Goals | Team |
|---|---|---|
| (Spain) Rubén Pérez | 27 | Varea |
| (Spain) Leo López | 26 | Haro |
| (Spain) Alberto Baztán | 22 | Casalarreina |
| (Spain) Javi Martínez | 21 | Náxara |
| (Spain) Chimbo | 20 | Varea |

Top goalkeeper

| Goalkeeper | Goals | Matches | Average | Team |
|---|---|---|---|---|
| (Spain) Andrés Pinillos | 28 | 33 | 0.85 | Varea |

== Group 17 – Aragon ==
=== Teams ===
Location of teams of the 2016–17 Tercera División Group 17
Teams in Zaragoza: Atlético Escalerillas, Deportivo Aragón

| Team | City | Home ground |
|---|---|---|
| Almudévar | Almudévar | La Corona |
| Andorra | Andorra | Juan Antonio Endeiza |
| Atlético Escalerillas | Zaragoza | Parque Oliver |
| Belchite 97 | Belchite | Municipal |
| Binéfar | Binéfar | Los Olmos |
| Borja | Borja | Manuel Meler |
| Brea | Brea de Aragón | Piedrabuena |
| Cariñena | Cariñena | La Platera |
| Cuarte | Cuarte de Huerva | Nuevo Municipal |
| Deportivo Aragón | Zaragoza | Ciudad Deportiva |
| Ejea | Ejea de los Caballeros | Luchán |
| Épila | Épila | La Huerta |
| Illueca | Illueca | Papa Luna |
| Robres | Robres | San Blas |
| Sabiñánigo | Sabiñánigo | Joaquín Ascaso |
| Sariñena | Sariñena | El Carmen |
| Tamarite | Tamarite de Litera | La Colomina |
| Tarazona | Tarazona | Municipal |
| Teruel | Teruel | Pinilla |
| Utebo | Utebo | Santa Ana |

=== League table ===
| Pos | Team | Pld | W | D | L | GF | GA | GD | Pts | Qualification or relegation |
|---|---|---|---|---|---|---|---|---|---|---|
| 1 | Deportivo Aragón (O, P) | 38 | 26 | 7 | 5 | 85 | 30 | +55 | 85 | Qualification to group champions' playoffs |
| 2 | Tarazona | 38 | 19 | 9 | 10 | 68 | 46 | +22 | 66 | Qualification to promotion playoffs |
| 3 | Utebo | 38 | 18 | 12 | 8 | 60 | 38 | +22 | 66 | Qualification to promotion playoffs |
| 4 | Ejea | 38 | 18 | 10 | 10 | 59 | 38 | +21 | 64 | Qualification to promotion playoffs |
| 5 | Teruel | 38 | 16 | 14 | 8 | 65 | 39 | +26 | 62 | |
| 6 | Borja | 38 | 14 | 18 | 6 | 48 | 35 | +13 | 60 | |
| 7 | Almudévar | 38 | 16 | 9 | 13 | 66 | 49 | +17 | 57 | |
| 8 | Robres | 38 | 14 | 13 | 11 | 46 | 45 | +1 | 55 | |
| 9 | Illueca | 38 | 13 | 14 | 11 | 50 | 42 | +8 | 53 | |
| 10 | Sabiñánigo | 38 | 15 | 8 | 15 | 53 | 51 | +2 | 53 | |
| 11 | Tamarite | 38 | 15 | 6 | 17 | 56 | 69 | −13 | 51 | |
| 12 | Brea | 38 | 13 | 9 | 16 | 48 | 55 | −7 | 48 | |
| 13 | Binéfar | 38 | 12 | 9 | 17 | 40 | 41 | −1 | 45 | |
| 14 | Cariñena | 38 | 12 | 9 | 17 | 55 | 64 | −9 | 45 | |
| 15 | Belchite 97 | 38 | 12 | 8 | 18 | 35 | 60 | −25 | 44 | |
| 16 | Sariñena | 38 | 11 | 11 | 16 | 42 | 60 | −18 | 44 | |
| 17 | Cuarte (R) | 38 | 12 | 7 | 19 | 50 | 66 | −16 | 43 | Relegation to Regional Preferente |
| 18 | Atlético Escalerillas (R) | 38 | 10 | 9 | 19 | 46 | 60 | −14 | 39 | Relegation to Regional Preferente |
| 19 | Épila (R) | 38 | 10 | 6 | 22 | 38 | 75 | −37 | 36 | Relegation to Regional Preferente |
| 20 | Andorra (R) | 38 | 7 | 6 | 25 | 34 | 81 | −47 | 27 | Relegation to Regional Preferente |

Rules for classification: 1) points; 2) head-to-head points; 3) head-to-head goal difference; 4) goal difference; 5) number of goals scored; 6) fair-play points; 7) playoff match
(O) Play-off winners; (P) Promoted; (R) Relegated

Top goalscorers

| Goalscorers | Goals | Team |
|---|---|---|
| (Spain) Alberto Morales | 26 | Illueca |
| (Spain) Míchel Sanz | 19 | Tarazona |
| (Spain) José María Zamora | 19 | Sabiñánigo |
| (Ivory Coast) Dramane Kamaté | 17 | Teruel |
| (Spain) Feliu Grau | 15 | Tamarite |

Top goalkeeper

| Goalkeeper | Goals | Matches | Average | Team |
|---|---|---|---|---|
| (Spain) Aitor Chueca | 25 | 33 | 0.76 | Deportivo Aragón |

== Group 18 – Castilla-La Mancha ==
=== Teams ===
Location of teams of the 2016–17 Tercera División Group 18

| Team | City | Home ground |
|---|---|---|
| Albacete B | Albacete | Andrés Iniesta |
| Almagro | Almagro | Manuel Trujillo |
| Almansa | Almansa | Polideportivo Municipal |
| Atlético Tomelloso | Tomelloso | Paco Gálvez |
| Azuqueca | Azuqueca de Henares | San Miguel |
| Carrión | Carrión de Calatrava | Nuestra Señora de la Encarnación |
| Conquense | Cuenca | La Fuensanta |
| Guadalajara | Guadalajara | Pedro Escartín |
| Illescas | Illescas | Municipal |
| Madridejos | Madridejos | Nuevo Estadio |
| Manchego | Ciudad Real | Juan Carlos I |
| Marchamalo | Marchamalo | La Solana |
| Mora | Mora | Las Delicias |
| Pedroñeras | Las Pedroñeras | Municipal |
| Quintanar del Rey | Quintanar del Rey | San Marcos |
| Talavera de la Reina | Talavera de la Reina | El Prado |
| Toledo B | Toledo | Salto del Caballo |
| Villarrobledo | Villarrobledo | Nuestra Señora de la Caridad |
| Villarrubia | Villarrubia de los Ojos | Nuevo Municipal |
| Yuncos | Yuncos | Villa de Yuncos |

=== League table ===
| Pos | Team | Pld | W | D | L | GF | GA | GD | Pts | Qualification or relegation |
|---|---|---|---|---|---|---|---|---|---|---|
| 1 | Talavera de la Reina (O, P) | 38 | 25 | 8 | 5 | 89 | 37 | +52 | 83 | Qualification to group champions' playoffs |
| 2 | Conquense | 38 | 23 | 6 | 9 | 74 | 43 | +31 | 75 | Qualification to promotion playoffs |
| 3 | Villarrobledo | 38 | 19 | 13 | 6 | 75 | 42 | +33 | 70 | Qualification to promotion playoffs |
| 4 | Guadalajara | 38 | 21 | 7 | 10 | 64 | 43 | +21 | 70 | Qualification to promotion playoffs |
| 5 | Villarrubia | 38 | 20 | 7 | 11 | 61 | 38 | +23 | 67 | |
| 6 | Almansa | 38 | 18 | 9 | 11 | 68 | 54 | +14 | 63 | |
| 7 | Manchego | 38 | 17 | 11 | 10 | 53 | 40 | +13 | 62 | |
| 8 | Quintanar del Rey | 38 | 13 | 13 | 12 | 61 | 52 | +9 | 52 | |
| 9 | Azuqueca | 38 | 15 | 7 | 16 | 67 | 57 | +10 | 52 | |
| 10 | Madridejos | 38 | 14 | 9 | 15 | 43 | 53 | −10 | 51 | |
| 11 | Marchamalo | 38 | 14 | 8 | 16 | 43 | 49 | −6 | 50 | |
| 12 | Almagro | 38 | 13 | 10 | 15 | 44 | 52 | −8 | 49 | |
| 13 | Atlético Tomelloso | 38 | 14 | 6 | 18 | 46 | 53 | −7 | 48 | |
| 14 | Mora | 38 | 13 | 7 | 18 | 46 | 66 | −20 | 46 | |
| 15 | Albacete B | 38 | 11 | 12 | 15 | 49 | 56 | −7 | 45 | |
| 16 | Pedroñeras | 38 | 10 | 15 | 13 | 46 | 45 | +1 | 45 | |
| 17 | Toledo B (Note: Relegated due to the relegations of regional teams from the 2016–17 Segunda División B.) (R) | 38 | 12 | 8 | 18 | 47 | 61 | −14 | 44 | Relegation to Primera Autonómica Preferente |
| 18 | Illescas (R) | 38 | 12 | 3 | 23 | 56 | 82 | −26 | 39 | Relegation to Primera Autonómica Preferente |
| 19 | Carrión (R) | 38 | 6 | 8 | 24 | 37 | 90 | −53 | 26 | Relegation to Primera Autonómica Preferente |
| 20 | Yuncos (R) | 38 | 3 | 7 | 28 | 24 | 80 | −56 | 16 | Relegation to Primera Autonómica Preferente |

Rules for classification: 1) points; 2) head-to-head points; 3) head-to-head goal difference; 4) goal difference; 5) number of goals scored; 6) fair-play points; 7) playoff match
(O) Play-off winners; (P) Promoted; (R) Relegated
Notes:

Top goalscorers

| Goalscorers | Goals | Team |
|---|---|---|
| (Spain) Jesús Jiménez | 26 | Talavera de la Reina |
| (Spain) Antonio Calle | 21 | Villarrobledo |
| (Spain) Gabri Salazar | 21 | Toledo B |
| (Spain) Murci | 18 | Talavera de la Reina |
| (Spain) Migue Montes | 17 | Guadalajara |

Top goalkeeper

| Goalkeeper | Goals | Matches | Average | Team |
|---|---|---|---|---|
| (Spain) Sergio Arenas | 32 | 36 | 0.89 | Talavera de la Reina |
