= Vitaka Rodríguez =

Spanish footballer

Vitaka Rodriguez
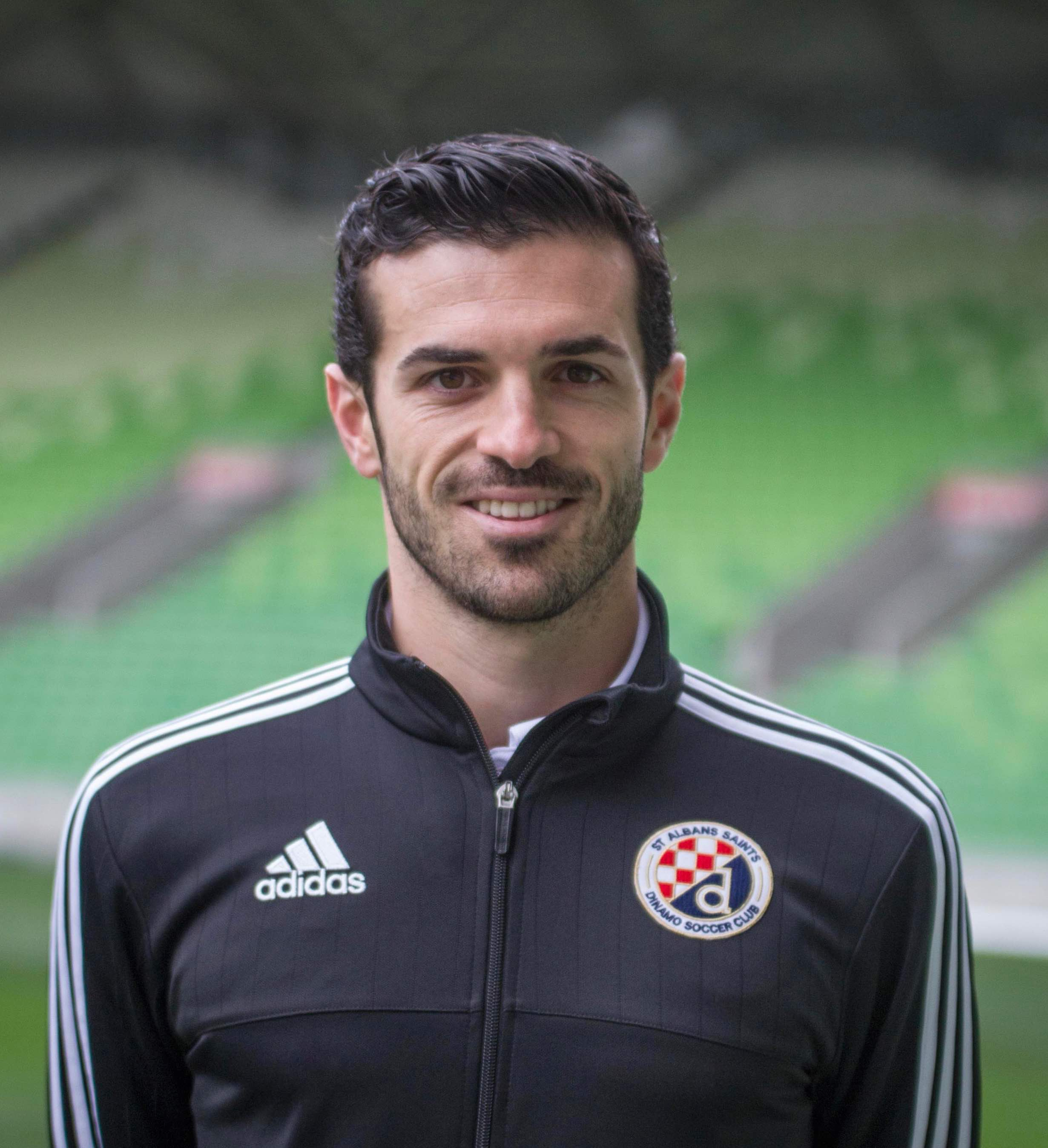
- Vitaka Rodriguez with St Albans Saints in 2016

Personal information
- Full name: Viktor Rodríguez Villar
- Date of birth: 6 August 1987 (age 39)
- Place of birth: Santa Cruz de Tenerife, Spain
- Height: 1.78 m (5 ft 10 in)
- Positions: Attacking midfielder; winger

Team information
- Current team: CD Santa Úrsula
- Number: 8

Youth career
- Real Betis

Senior career*
Years	Team	Apps	(Gls)
2007–2008	Tenerife Sur Ibarra	19	(0)
2008–2009	Santomera	27	(3)
2009–2010	Laguna	24	(2)
2010–2011	Kozani	13	(0)
2012–2013	Beziers	0	(0)
2013–2014	Bendigo	24	(4)
2014–2015	Green Gully	0	(0)
2015–2016	Marino	27	(1)
2016–2017	St Albans Saints	13	(2)
2017–2018	Santa Ursula	10	(0)
- * Club domestic league appearances and goals

Viktor "Vitaka" Rodríguez Villar (born 6 August 1987) is a Spanish footballer who plays for CD Santa Úrsula.

Naturally left-footed, he plays mainly as an attacking midfielder; he can, however, also operate in other positions, such as winger or second striker. He is well known for his ability to create goal scoring situations.

== Club career ==
=== Early career ===
Born in Santa Cruz de Tenerife, Canary Islands, Spain, Vitaka joined Real Betis's youth team at the age of 17, having arrived from local side Real Unión de Tenerife.

=== Senior career ===
Vitaka made his senior debut with UD Tenerife Sur Ibarra, going on to appear in 19 official games for the club over the 2007/2008 season. The following year he moved to Spanish mainland signing for Arimesa Santomera CF.

On 10 August 2010, Vitaka signed a one-year deal with OPAP Greek Football League club Kozani FC. He made his debut on 9 September 2010 against Aspropyrgos Enosis playing the full 90 minutes in a 1-0 home win in which he was named Man of the Match.

The 2010/2011 season saw Kozani FC reach the fourth round of the Greek Cup where they faced Greek powerhouse Panathinaikos FC.

In February 2014, Australian club FC Bendigo signed Vitaka Rodriguez. He played his first official game for Bendigo on 29 March 2014 in a 2-1 away defeat against Whittlesea Rangers FC. Vitaka scored his first league goal with FC Bendigo on 9 May 2014 against Dandenong City in a 4-2 win. When the season was over Vitaka had managed to score 3 goals and provided 11 assists in the 24 league games he played, attracting the attention of another National Premier League clubs including South Melbourne FC, Green Gully Cavaliers and Oakleigh Cannons FC.

On 27 November 2014 Green Gully Cavaliers announced the signing of Vitaka on a 1-year deal. Vitaka said: "I’m very happy to have signed for Green Gully. It’s a club with a great history and one of the biggest in the National Premier League. I’m looking forward to the upcoming season.” In February 2015, it was confirmed that Rodriguez had suffered an osteitis pubis and would miss most of the season.

On 27 August 2015, Vitaka returned to Spain to sign for CD Marino on a one-year contract. He netted his first goal for CD Marino on 4 November when he started in a 1–2 away win against UD Orotava.

On 15 June 2016, Rodriguez signed for St Albans Saints SC during the PS4 National Premier League mid-season transfer window. He played his first official game for St Albans on 25 June 2016 in a 2-1 home win against Moreland Zebras. Vitaka scored his first league goal with St Albans Saints SC on 16 July 2016 against Moreland City in a 2-2 draw. On 3 September 2016, St Albans Saints defeated Whittlesea Ranges 1-0 in their last game of the season, with Vitaka Rodriguez scoring the winning goal to become the PS4 National Premier League's 2016 Champions.

In September 2017, Vitaka returned to Spain to sign for CD Santa Ursula on a one-year contract. He played his first game for CD Santa Ursula on 23 September against CD Mensajero.

Club	Country	Season
UD Tenerife Sur Ibarra	Spain	2007–2008
Arimesa Santomera CF	Spain	2008–2009
CD Laguna SAD	Spain	2009–2010
Kozani FC	Greece	2010–2011
AS Béziers	France	2012–2013
FC Bendigo	Australia	2013–2014
Green Gully Cavaliers	Australia	2014–2015
CD Marino	Spain	2015–2016
St Albans Saints SC	Australia	2016–2017
CD Santa Ursula	Spain	2017–

== Honours ==
=== Club ===
St Albans Saints SC

- PS4 National Premier League Champions 2016
