= CD Santa Úrsula =

Spanish football team

Santa Úrsula
- Full name: Club Deportivo Santa Úrsula
- Founded: 1975
- Dissolved: 2025
- Ground: Estadio Municipal Argelio Tabares, Santa Úrsula, Canary Islands, Spain
- Capacity: 2,000
- Chairman: (Spain) Rosa Alonso
- Manager: (Spain) Rubén García Luis
- League: Tercera Federación – Group 12
- 2024–25: Tercera Federación – Group 12, 13th of 18
Home colours	Away colours

Club Deportivo Santa Úrsula was a Spanish football team based in Santa Ursula, in the autonomous community of the Canary Islands. Founded in 1975 it last played in Tercera Federación – Group 12, and held home games at Estadio Argelio Tabares, with a capacity of 2,000 seats.

== History ==
In the 2016-17 season the club finished 16th in the Tercera División, Group 12. On 10 July 2025, the club merged into the structure of Real Unión de Tenerife, with Real Unión taking their place in Tercera Federación.

== Season to season ==
Season	Tier	Division	Place	Copa del Rey
1980–81	7	2ª Reg.	11th	
1981–82	DNP			
1982–83	7	2ª Reg.	10th	
1983–84	DNP			
1984–85	7	2ª Reg.	6th	
1985–86	7	2ª Reg.	4th	
1986–87	7	2ª Reg.	6th	
1987–88	6	1ª Reg.	10th	
1988–89	6	1ª Reg.	8th	
1989–90	6	1ª Reg.	2nd	
1990–91	5	Int. Pref.	16th	
1991–92	DNP			
1992–93	DNP			
1993–94	7	2ª Int.	7th	
1994–95	7	2ª Int.	4th	
1995–96	7	2ª Int.	3rd	
1996–97	6	1ª Int.	13th	
1997–98	6	1ª Int.	5th	
1998–99	6	1ª Int.	14th	
1999–2000	7	2ª Int.	1st	

Season	Tier	Division	Place	Copa del Rey
2000–01	6	1ª Int.	11th	
2001–02	6	1ª Int.	12th	
2002–03	6	1ª Int.	4th	
2003–04	6	1ª Int.	1st	
2004–05	6	1ª Int.	5th	
2005–06	6	1ª Int.	6th	
2006–07	6	1ª Int.	6th	
2007–08	6	1ª Int.	7th	
2008–09	6	1ª Int.	5th	
2009–10	6	1ª Int.	2nd	
2010–11	6	1ª Int.	2nd	
2011–12	5	Int. Pref.	6th	
2012–13	5	Int. Pref.	4th	
2013–14	5	Int. Pref.	2nd	
2014–15	4	3ª	13th	
2015–16	4	3ª	13th	
2016–17	4	3ª	17th	
2017–18	4	3ª	7th	
2018–19	4	3ª	9th	
2019–20	4	3ª	13th	

Season	Tier	Division	Place	Copa del Rey
2020–21	4	3ª	6th / 3rd	
2021–22	5	3ª RFEF	8th	
2022–23	5	3ª Fed.	8th	
2023–24	5	3ª Fed.	7th	
2024–25	5	3ª Fed.	13th	

- 7 seasons in Tercera División
- 4 seasons in Tercera Federación/Tercera División RFEF
