= Gerardo Berodia =

Spanish footballer

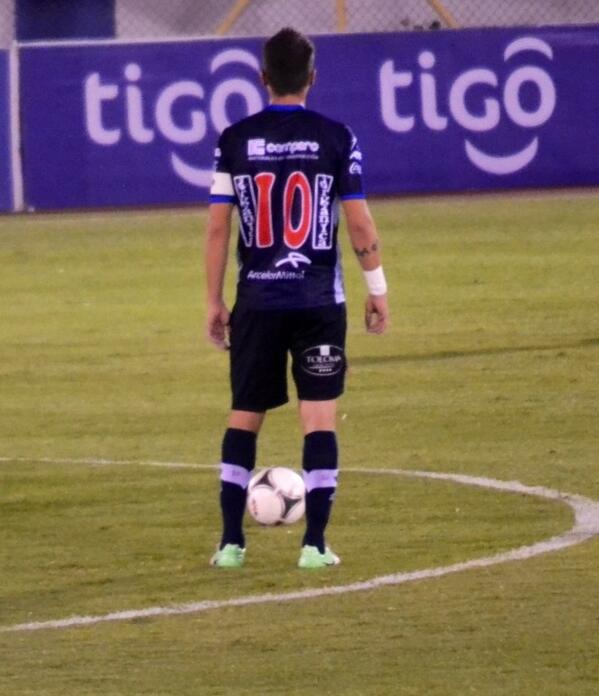
- Berodia with Jorge Wilstermann in 2014

Personal information
- Full name: Gerardo García Berodia
- Date of birth: 6 June 1981 (age 45)
- Place of birth: Madrid, Spain
- Height: 1.84 m (6 ft 0 in)
- Positions: Winger; forward

Youth career
- 1991–1998: Real Madrid
- 1998–1999: Alcorcón
- 1999–2000: Getafe

Senior career*
Years	Team	Apps	(Gls)
2000–2001	El Álamo	?	(4)
2001–2002	Santa Ana	?	(11)
2002–2003	Alcalá	7	(1)
2003–2004	Atlético Pinto	23	(6)
2004–2005	S.S. Reyes	22	(2)
2005–2007	Navalcarnero	?	(33)
2007–2008	Leganés	34	(12)
2008–2009	Zamora	34	(10)
2009–2010	Ponferradina	22	(3)
2010–2011	Conquense	34	(9)
2011–2013	Lugo	34	(7)
2013–2014	Jorge Wilstermann	59	(17)
2014–2016	Navalcarnero	64	(34)
2016–2017	Móstoles	33	(17)
2017–2018	Rayo Majadahonda	12	(6)
2018–2019	Unión Adarve	40	(10)
2021–2022	Celta Barreiros	2	(1)
Total		420+	(183+)
- * Club domestic league appearances and goals

Gerardo García Berodia (born 6 June 1981) is a Spanish former professional footballer who played as a left winger or a forward.

He amassed Segunda División B totals of 235 matches and 60 goals over nine seasons, representing nine clubs. At the professional level, he appeared for Lugo and Jorge Wilstermann.

== Club career ==
Born in Madrid, Berodia joined Real Madrid in 1991 at age 10. He left seven years later and, until the age of 31, competed solely in lower league and amateur football, representing CD El Álamo, DAV Santa Ana, RSD Alcalá, CA Pinto, UD San Sebastián de los Reyes, CDA Navalcarnero, CD Leganés, Zamora CF, SD Ponferradina, UB Conquense and CD Lugo; with the latter club, he contributed seven goals in the 2011–12 season to help to promotion to Segunda División after a two-decade absence, also being featured in the playoffs against CD Atlético Baleares and Cádiz CF.

Berodia appeared in his first game as a professional on 15 September 2012, coming on as a 75th-minute substitute in a 2–4 home loss against SD Huesca. In the following transfer window, he moved abroad for the first time in his career and joined several compatriots at Club Jorge Wilstermann from the Liga de Fútbol Profesional Boliviano.

Berodia scored 14 goals in his only full campaign, notably helping his team finish fourth in the Apertura. He returned to Spain shortly after due to family reasons, signing with former side Navalcarnero.

On 10 January 2016, during a Tercera División fixture at CU Collado Villalba, Berodia netted seven times in a final 12–1 rout, as the opposition fielded only youth players in protest against the board of directors.

== Personal life ==
After returning to Spain in the middle of 2014, finding himself unemployed, Berodia bought a taxicab to provide for his family. He continued exercising the profession still as an active player.
