= Sergio Arenas =

Spanish footballer (born 1989)

Personal information
- Full name: Sergio Arenas Llagostera
- Date of birth: 11 March 1989 (age 37)
- Place of birth: Albacete, Spain
- Height: 1.85 m (6 ft 1 in)
- Position: Goalkeeper

Youth career
- Albacete

Senior career*
Years	Team	Apps	(Gls)
2009–2010	Albacete B		
2009	Albacete	1	(0)
2010–2012	Getafe B	13	(0)
2012–2013	Albacete B	22	(0)
2013–2015	Almansa	72	(0)
2015–2016	Badajoz	29	(0)
2016–2018	Talavera	52	(0)
2018–2019	Atlético Tomelloso	29	(0)
2019–2020	Suzuka Unlimited	9	(0)
- * Club domestic league appearances and goals as of 29 October 2020

Sergio Arenas Llagostera (born 11 March 1989) is a Spanish footballer who plays as a goalkeeper.

== Football career ==
Born in Albacete, Castile-La Mancha, Arenas represented Albacete Balompié as a youth. After making his senior debut with the reserves in Tercera División in 2009, he made his first team debut on 24 October of that year in a 0–4 Segunda División away loss against UD Las Palmas; he replaced field player Juanmi Callejón as Jesús Cabrero was sent off, and also saved a penalty kick.

In 2010, Arenas moved to another reserve team, Getafe CF B in Segunda División B. On 14 July 2012, he returned to Albacete and its B-side, and featured regularly during the season.

On 13 July 2013, Arenas signed for UD Almansa also in the fourth division. On 10 July 2015, after two years as an undisputed starter, he joined fellow league team CD Badajoz.

On 23 July 2016, Arenas agreed to a contract with CF Talavera de la Reina in the fourth tier. He was a first-choice during his first campaign, as his side achieved promotion to the third level.

In 2019, Arenas joined to Japanese club Suzuka Unlimited. He was released at the end of 2020 season.
