= Arcos CF =

Association football club in Spain

Arcos
- Full name: Arcos Club de Fútbol
- Founded: 14 April 1956; 70 years ago
- Ground: Antonio Barbadillo, Arcos de la Frontera, Andalusia, Spain
- Capacity: 2,900
- President: Miguel Orellana
- Manager: Manuel Rosales
- League: División de Honor – Group 1
- 2025–26: Primera Andaluza Cádiz, 3rd of 16 (promoted via play-offs)
Home colours	Away colours

Arcos Club de Fútbol is a Spanish football team based in Arcos de la Frontera, Cádiz, in the autonomous community of Andalusia. Founded in 1956, they play in División de Honor – Group 1, holding home matches at Nuevo Estadio Antonio Barbadillo, with a capacity of 2,900 people.

== Season to season ==
Season	Tier	Division	Place	Copa del Rey
1956–57	3	3ª	4th	
1957–58	3	3ª	20th	
1958–59	4	1ª Reg.	10th	
1959–60	5	2ª Reg.		
1960–1965	DNP			
1965–66	4	1ª Reg.	3rd	
1966–67	4	1ª Reg.		
1967–68	4	1ª Reg.		
1968–69	5	2ª Reg.	4th	
1969–70	5	2ª Reg.	2nd	
1970–71	5	2ª Reg.	2nd	
1971–72	5	2ª Reg.	2nd	
1972–73	4	1ª Reg.	19th	
1973–74	5	2ª Reg.	7th	
1974–75	4	1ª Reg.	13th	
1975–76	5	1ª Reg.	3rd	
1976–77	5	1ª Reg.	6th	
1977–78	5	Reg. Pref.	12th	
1978–79	5	Reg. Pref.	20th	
1979–80	6	1ª Reg.	18th	

Season	Tier	Division	Place	Copa del Rey
1980–81	6	1ª Reg.	7th	
1981–82	6	1ª Reg.	11th	
1982–83	6	1ª Reg.	11th	
1983–84	6	1ª Reg.	4th	
1984–85	6	1ª Reg.	5th	
1985–86	6	1ª Reg.	1st	
1986–87	5	Reg. Pref.	3rd	
1987–88	5	Reg. Pref.	3rd	
1988–89	5	Reg. Pref.	7th	
1989–90	5	Reg. Pref.	3rd	
1990–91	5	Reg. Pref.	4th	
1991–92	5	Reg. Pref.	2nd	
1992–93	4	3ª	18th	
1993–94	5	Reg. Pref.	13th	
1994–95	5	Reg. Pref.	14th	
1995–96	5	Reg. Pref.	10th	
1996–97	5	Reg. Pref.	16th	
1997–98	6	1ª Reg.	8th	
1998–99	6	1ª Reg.	8th	
1999–2000	6	1ª Reg.	9th	

Season	Tier	Division	Place	Copa del Rey
2000–01	6	1ª Prov.	1st	
2001–02	5	Reg. Pref.	15th	
2002–03	6	1ª Prov.	1st	
2003–04	5	Reg. Pref.	3rd	
2004–05	5	1ª And.	1st	
2005–06	4	3ª	3rd	
2006–07	4	3ª	8th	
2007–08	4	3ª	19th	
2008–09	5	1ª And.	3rd	
2009–10	5	1ª And.	3rd	
2010–11	5	1ª And.	2nd	
2011–12	4	3ª	15th	
2012–13	4	3ª	16th	
2013–14	4	3ª	17th	
2014–15	4	3ª	17th	
2015–16	4	3ª	7th	
2016–17	4	3ª	2nd	
2017–18	4	3ª	15th	First round
2018–19	4	3ª	18th	
2019–20	4	3ª	15th	

Season	Tier	Division	Place	Copa del Rey
2020–21	4	3ª	9th / 8th	
2021–22	6	Div. Hon.	7th	
2022–23	6	Div. Hon.	14th	
2023–24	7	1ª And.	8th	
2024–25	7	1ª And.	2nd	
2025–26	7	1ª And.		

- 16 seasons in Tercera División
