= CA Cirbonero =

Association football club in Spain

Cirbonero
- Full name: Club Atlético Cirbonero
- Founded: 1945
- Ground: San Juan, Cintruénigo, Navarre, Spain
- Capacity: 1,000
- President: (Spain) Conrado Rández
- Head coach: (Spain) Sergio Vázquez
- League: Tercera Federación – Group 15
- 2025–26: Tercera Federación – Group 15, 10th of 18
Home colours	Away colours

Club Atlético Cirbonero is a Spanish football team based in Cintruénigo in the autonomous community of Navarre. Founded in 1945, it plays in Tercera Federación – Group 15. Its stadium is Estadio San Juan with a capacity of 1,000.

== History ==
In 2010, Atlético Cirbonero finished in the third position of the Group 14 of Tercera División and qualified for the first time to the promotion playoffs to Segunda División B, but was eliminated in the first round by Ayamonte CF.

Six years later, the club qualified again to the promotion playoffs, this time as runner-up of the Navarrese group, but it did not pass from the first round, where was beaten by CD Cayón.

In 2016, Atlético Cirbonero made its debut in the Copa del Rey. Despite being a Tercera División team, it beat SD Ponferradina and Racing de Ferrol, both Segunda División B, after the penalty shootout. In the 2018-19 season the club finished 7th in the group 15 of the Tercera División.

== Season to season ==
Season	Tier	Division	Place	Copa del Rey
1966–67	5	2ª Reg.	9th	
1967–68	5	2ª Reg.	9th	
1968–69	5	2ª Reg.	8th	
1969–70	5	2ª Reg.	1st	
1970–71	4	1ª Reg.	10th	
1971–72	4	1ª Reg.	20th	
1972–73	5	2ª Reg.	1st	
1973–74	4	1ª Reg.	4th	
1974–75	4	Reg. Pref.	7th	
1975–76	4	Reg. Pref.	16th	
1976–77	5	1ª Reg.	1st	
1977–78	5	Reg. Pref.	17th	
1978–79	6	1ª Reg.	1st	
1979–80	5	Reg. Pref.	4th	
1980–81	5	Reg. Pref.	3rd	
1981–82	5	Reg. Pref.	5th	
1982–83	5	Reg. Pref.	3rd	
1983–84	4	3ª	11th	
1984–85	4	3ª	11th	
1985–86	4	3ª	17th	

Season	Tier	Division	Place	Copa del Rey
1986–87	4	3ª	16th	
1987–88	4	3ª	20th	
1988–89	5	Reg. Pref.	21st	
1989–90	6	1ª Reg.	2nd	
1990–91	6	1ª Reg.	4th	
1991–92	5	Reg. Pref.	6th	
1992–93	5	Reg. Pref.	10th	
1993–94	5	Reg. Pref.	2nd	
1994–95	5	Reg. Pref.	9th	
1995–96	5	Reg. Pref.	15th	
1996–97	5	Reg. Pref.	6th	
1997–98	5	Reg. Pref.	15th	
1998–99	5	Reg. Pref.	3rd	
1999–2000	5	Reg. Pref.	3rd	
2000–01	5	Reg. Pref.	4th	
2001–02	5	Reg. Pref.	5th	
2002–03	5	Reg. Pref.	5th	
2003–04	5	Reg. Pref.	4th	
2004–05	4	3ª	10th	
2005–06	4	3ª	13th	

Season	Tier	Division	Place	Copa del Rey
2006–07	4	3ª	6th	
2007–08	4	3ª	14th	
2008–09	4	3ª	7th	
2009–10	4	3ª	3rd	
2010–11	4	3ª	8th	
2011–12	4	3ª	8th	
2012–13	4	3ª	5th	
2013–14	4	3ª	10th	
2014–15	4	3ª	13th	
2015–16	4	3ª	2nd	
2016–17	4	3ª	3rd	Third round
2017–18	4	3ª	4th	
2018–19	4	3ª	7th	
2019–20	4	3ª	7th	
2020–21	4	3ª	2nd / 5th	
2021–22	5	3ª RFEF	1st	
2022–23	4	2ª Fed.	14th	First round
2023–24	5	3ª Fed.	8th	
2024–25	5	3ª Fed.	10th	
2025–26	5	3ª Fed.	10th	

Season	Tier	Division	Place	Copa del Rey
2026–27	5	3ª Fed.		

- 1 season in Segunda Federación
- 22 seasons in Tercera División
- 5 seasons in Tercera Federación/Tercera División RFEF
