= Elhadji Bandeh =

Spanish footballer

Personal information
- Full name: Elhadji Bandeh Kandeh
- Date of birth: 2 August 1990 (age 36)
- Place of birth: Mataró, Spain
- Height: 1.94 m (6 ft 4 1/2 in)
- Position: Forward

Team information
- Current team: Sant Andreu

Youth career
- 2003–2004: Llongueras Sant Crist
- 2004–2006: Damm
- 2006–2008: Llongueras Sant Crist
- 2008–2009: Europa

Senior career*
| Years | Team | Apps | (Gls) |
| 2009–2014 | Júpiter | | |
| 2014–2015 | Martinenc | 32 | (16) |
| 2015–2016 | Prat | 35 | (5) |
| 2016–2017 | Cerdanyola | 21 | (16) |
| 2017–2019 | Sant Andreu | 43 | (13) |
| 2019 | Karaiskakis | 12 | (0) |
| 2019– | Sant Andreu | 10 | (5) |
- * Club domestic league appearances and goals as of 22:07, 6 November 2019 (UTC)

Elhadji Bandeh Kandeh (born 8 February 1990) is a Spanish professional footballer who plays as a forward for UE Sant Andreu.

== Club career ==
Born in Mataró, Barcelona, Catalonia, to Gambian parents, Bandeh represented Llongueras Sant Crist de Badalona, CF Damm, CE Europa as a youth. In 2009, he made his senior debut for CE Júpiter, in Primera Catalana. Five years later, he switched to Tercera División side FC Martinenc. He scored 16 goals in 32 matches and ended being the fifth highest scorer in his category in the season.

On 1 July 2015, Bandeh signed with AE Prat of the same tier. After a stint with Cerdanyola del Vallès FC in the following season, he moved to UE Sant Andreu on 17 July 2017, on a one-year deal.

On 31 January 2019, Bandeh moved abroad for the first time in his career and joined Greek Football League club Karaiskakis.
