= México FC (Spain) =

Association football club in Spain

- Full name: Mexico FC SAD.
- Nickname: México FC
- Founded: 1995
- Ground: Estadio Municipal, Paracuellos de Jarama, Madrid, Spain
- Capacity: 1,500
- President: Victor Ferraez Gaque
- Head coach: Sergio Rubio
- League: Tercera Federación – Group 7
- 2025–26: Tercera Federación – Group 7, 11th of 18
- Website: mexicofc.com
Home colours	Away colours

México FC S.A.D., formerly known as Club Deportivo Paracuellos MX S.A.D is a Spanish football club based in Paracuellos de Jarama, in the autonomous community of Madrid. Founded in 1995, it plays in Tercera Federación – Group 7, holding home games at Estadio Municipal, which has a capacity of 1,500 spectators.

== History ==
Founded in 1995 as Soto de la Moraleja Club de Fútbol, Alcobendas first reached the fourth division in 2006–07, finishing in fourteenth position. Changing its name to Soto de Alcobendas Club de Fútbol in 2005, the team was again renamed the following year, to Alcobendas Sport, with the intention to cover the entire city.

In April 2020, Alcobendas announced an agreement with CF Rayo Majadahonda, and changed name to CD Paracuellos Antamira. On 30 May 2023, their affiliation link ended, with Rayo Majadahonda choosing CU Collado Villalba as their new reserve team.

In August 2023, a Mexican group of investors bought the club to launch the project called México FC; the club initially changed name to Paracuellos MX for the 2023–24 season, before taking the name of the project ahead of the 2024–25 campaign.

== Season to season ==
- As Soto de la Moraleja

Season	Tier	Division	Place	Copa del Rey
1995–96	8	3ª Reg.	16th	
1996–97	8	3ª Reg.	7th	
1997–98	8	3ª Reg.	2nd	
1998–99	7	2ª Reg.	1st	
1999–2000	6	1ª Reg.	12th	
2000–01	6	1ª Reg.	2nd	
2001–02	5	Reg. Pref.	17th	
2002–03	6	1ª Reg.	4th	
2003–04	6	1ª Reg.	1st	
2004–05	5	Reg. Pref.	14th	

- As Soto Alcobendas

Season	Tier	Division	Place	Copa del Rey
2005–06	5	Reg. Pref.	1st	
2006–07	4	3ª	14th	

- As Alcobendas Sport

Season	Tier	Division	Place	Copa del Rey
2007–08	4	3ª	7th	
2008–09	4	3ª	4th	
2009–10	4	3ª	16th	
2010–11	4	3ª	1st	
2011–12	4	3ª	8th	First round
2012–13	4	3ª	14th	
2013–14	4	3ª	11th	
2014–15	4	3ª	3rd	
2015–16	4	3ª	12th	
2016–17	4	3ª	3rd	
2017–18	4	3ª	7th	
2018–19	4	3ª	3rd	
2019–20	4	3ª	18th	

- As Paracuellos Antamira

Season	Tier	Division	Place	Copa del Rey
2020–21	4	3ª	9th / 2nd	N/A (Note: Reserve team of Rayo Majadahonda.)
2021–22	5	3ª RFEF	5th	N/A
2022–23	5	3ª Fed.	4th	N/A

- As Paracuellos MX

Season	Tier	Division	Place	Copa del Rey
2023–24	5	3ª Fed.	11th	

- As México FC

Season	Tier	Division	Place	Copa del Rey
2024–25	5	3ª Fed.	12th	
2025–26	5	3ª Fed.	11th	
2026–27	5	3ª Fed.		

- 15 seasons in Tercera División
- 6 seasons in Tercera Federación/Tercera División RFEF

== Crest ==
Crest evolution
2007–2014	2016–2020	2020–2022	2022–2023	2023–2024	2024–present
