= AD Unión Adarve =

Association football club in Spain

Coordinates: 40.4472°N 3.6591°W

Unión Adarve
- Full name: Agrupación Deportiva Unión Adarve
- Nickname: Lobos (The Wolves)
- Founded: 1961
- Ground: Vicente del Bosque; Madrid, Community of Madrid, Spain
- Capacity: 1,000
- President: Víctor Salamanca Cuevas
- Head coach: Diego Nogales
- League: Tercera Federación – Group 7
- 2025–26: Tercera Federación – Group 7, 6th of 18
- Website: www.unionadarve.com
Home colours	Away colours

Agrupación Deportiva Unión Adarve is a Spanish football team, from the Barrio del Pilar district of Fuencarral-El Pardo, in the city of Madrid, Community of Madrid. Founded in 1961, they play in Tercera Federación – Group 7.

== History ==
Unión Adarve resulted from a merger of two teams from Barrio del Pilar, ADC Adarve and Unión Barrio del Pilar (which was then refounded in 1983 in the place of AD Racing del Pilar). After several seasons in the Regional divisions, the club was promoted to Tercera División in 2007 by finishing in the third position of the 2006–07 Regional Preferente. In 2008 there was a change in the Board of Directors, José Ferreiro Feijó became the club's new president. With him Unión Adarve returned to Tercera División in 2011.

In 2013, Unión Adarve qualified for the first time in the promotion playoffs, but was eliminated by CD Tropezón in the second round. After several other attempts, promotion was finally gained in 2017 with an away goals victory after a 4–4 draw with Atlético Malagueño.

In the club's first Segunda División B campaign, they competed for the first time in the Copa del Rey, defeating neighbours CF Rayo Majadahonda 1–0 away in the first round on 30 August. In the next round away to UD Logroñés a week later, they lost 8–7 on penalties after a goalless draw. And in the league the club managed to finish in the 11th position. In May, 2019 the club appointed Javi Vázquez as head coach.

== Season to season ==
=== Unión Barrio del Pilar ===
Season	Tier	Division	Place	Copa del Rey
1983–84	6	1ª Reg.	18th	
1984–85	7	2ª Reg.	16th	
1985–86	7	2ª Reg.	2nd	
1986–87	6	1ª Reg.	15th	
1987–88	7	2ª Reg.	2nd	
1988–89	6	2ª Reg.	11th	
1989–90	7	2ª Reg.	5th	
1990–91	7	2ª Reg.	1st	
1991–92	6	1ª Reg.	4th	
1992–93	6	1ª Reg.	7th	
1993–94	6	1ª Reg.	3rd	
1994–95	5	Reg. Pref.	11th	

Season	Tier	Division	Place	Copa del Rey
1995–96	5	Reg. Pref.	4th	
1996–97	5	Reg. Pref.	7th	
1997–98	5	Reg. Pref.	7th	
1998–99	5	Reg. Pref.	2nd	
1999–2000	5	Reg. Pref.	6th	
2000–01	5	Reg. Pref.	8th	
2001–02	5	Reg. Pref.	3rd	
2002–03	5	Reg. Pref.	5th	
2003–04	5	Reg. Pref.	11th	
2004–05	5	Reg. Pref.	18th	
2005–06	6	1ª Reg.	2nd	

=== ADC Adarve ===
Season	Tier	Division	Place	Copa del Rey
1992–2000	DNP			
2000–01	6	2ª Reg.	2nd	
2001–02	6	1ª Reg.	7th	
2002–03	6	1ª Reg.	5th	
2003–04	6	1ª Reg.	4th	
2004–05	6	1ª Reg.	16th	
2005–06	DNP			

=== AD Unión Adarve ===
Season	Tier	Division	Place	Copa del Rey
2006–07	5	Reg. Pref.	3rd	
2007–08	4	3ª	21st	
2008–09	5	Reg. Pref.	5th	
2009–10	5	Pref.	6th	
2010–11	5	Pref.	2nd	
2011–12	4	3ª	12th	
2012–13	4	3ª	4th	
2013–14	4	3ª	3rd	
2014–15	4	3ª	4th	
2015–16	4	3ª	6th	
2016–17	4	3ª	2nd	
2017–18	3	2ª B	11th	Second round
2018–19	3	2ª B	18th	
2019–20	4	3ª	2nd	
2020–21	4	3ª	1st / 2nd	
2021–22	4	2ª RFEF	2nd	First round
2022–23	4	2ª Fed.	9th	First round
2023–24	4	2ª Fed.	9th	
2024–25	4	2ª Fed.	14th	
2025–26	5	3ª Fed.	6th	

Season	Tier	Division	Place	Copa del Rey
2026–27	5	3ª Fed.		

- 2 seasons in Segunda División B
- 4 seasons in Segunda Federación/Segunda División RFEF
- 9 seasons in Tercera División
- 2 seasons in Tercera Federación

== Players ==
=== Current squad ===
Note: Flags indicate national team as defined under FIFA eligibility rules; some limited exceptions apply. Players may hold more than one non-FIFA nationality.

No.	Pos.	Nation	Player
1	GK	ESP	Pablo Lombo
3	DF	ESP	Borja Paris
4	DF	ESP	Álvaro López
5	DF	ESP	Juanma Fernández
6	MF	ESP	Pablo Rojo
7	MF	ESP	Nacho Maganto
8	MF	ESP	Dani González
9	FW	ESP	Dani Segovia
10	MF	ESP	Fernando Calleja
11	DF	ESP	Alberto Miñambres (captain)

No.	Pos.	Nation	Player
13	GK	ESP	Guille Pérez
14	DF	ESP	Javi Lobato
15	DF	ESP	Dani Cuevas
16	FW	ESP	Fernando Harta
17	FW	DOM	Juanca Pineda
18	FW	ESP	Alberto Alburquerque
21	FW	ESP	Javier Carbonell
22	MF	ESP	Julio Cidoncha
24	FW	URU	Santiago Lagreca
25	GK	ESP	Zeus Martín

=== Reserve team ===
Note: Flags indicate national team as defined under FIFA eligibility rules; some limited exceptions apply. Players may hold more than one non-FIFA nationality.

No.	Pos.	Nation	Player
27	DF	ESP	Diego Rodríguez
28	DF	ESP	José Ignacio Busto

No.	Pos.	Nation	Player
30	FW	ESP	Daniel Gamonal

== Stadiums ==
- Vereda de Ganapanes
- Vicente del Bosque
- Campo García de la Mata (since 2018–19 season)
