= UD Ibarra =

Spanish football club

Ibarra
- Full name: Unión Deportiva Ibarra
- Nickname(s): Sureños, South Tenerife
- Founded: 1969
- Dissolved: August 1, 2025; 12 days ago
- Ground: Campo Municipal de Fútbol Villa Isabel; Arona, Tenerife, Canary Islands, Spain
- Capacity: 3,000
- Chairman: Carmelo Gonzalez
- Manager: Diego Maradona Jr.
- 2024–25: Tercera Federación – Group 12, 4th of 18
Home colours	Away colours

Unión Deportiva Ibarra was a Spanish football team based in Arona, southern Tenerife in the autonomous community of Canary Islands, Spain. Founded in 1969, it was dissolved in 2025, and held home matches at Estadio Villa Isabel, with a 3,000-seat capacity.

== History ==
In the 2017-18 season the club finished 5th in the Tercera División, Group 12. The following season was less successful, as the club finished in the middle, 10th among 20 teams.

On 1 August 2025, Ibarra was dissolved after 56 years of existence, due to debts.

== Season to season ==
Season	Tier	Division	Place	Copa del Rey
1969–70	6	3ª Reg.		
1970–71	6	3ª Reg.	7th	
1971–72	6	3ª Reg.		
1972–73	6	3ª Reg.	2nd	
1973–74	5	2ª Reg.		
1974–75	5	2ª Reg.		
1975–76	5	2ª Reg.		
1976–77	5	2ª Reg.	9th	
1977–78	DNP			
1978–79	6	1ª Reg.	11th	
1979–80	6	1ª Reg.	3rd	
1980–81	5	Reg. Pref.	3rd	
1981–82	5	Reg. Pref.	3rd	
1982–83	5	Reg. Pref.	9th	
1983–84	5	Reg. Pref.	10th	
1984–85	5	Reg. Pref.	9th	
1985–86	5	Reg. Pref.	1st	
1986–87	4	3ª	13th	
1987–88	4	3ª	4th	
1988–89	4	3ª	8th	

Season	Tier	Division	Place	Copa del Rey
1989–90	4	3ª	4th	
1990–91	4	3ª	13th	
1991–92	4	3ª	14th	
1992–93	4	3ª	11th	
1993–94	4	3ª	6th	
1994–95	4	3ª	9th	
1995–96	4	3ª	14th	
1996–97	4	3ª	15th	
1997–98	4	3ª	11th	
1998–99	4	3ª	15th	
1999–2000	4	3ª	17th	
2000–01	4	3ª	11th	
2001–02	4	3ª	12th	
2002–03	4	3ª	12th	
2003–04	4	3ª	14th	
2004–05	4	3ª	15th	
2005–06	4	3ª	11th	
2006–07	4	3ª	17th	
2007–08	4	3ª	19th	
2008–09	5	Int. Pref.	9th	

Season	Tier	Division	Place	Copa del Rey
2009–10	5	Int. Pref.	3rd	
2010–11	5	Int. Pref.	9th	
2011–12	5	Int. Pref.	3rd	
2012–13	4	3ª	12th	
2013–14	4	3ª	15th	
2014–15	4	3ª	10th	
2015–16	4	3ª	10th	
2016–17	4	3ª	4th	

Season	Tier	Division	Place	Copa del Rey
2017–18	4	3ª	5th	
2018–19	4	3ª	10th	
2019–20	4	3ª	18th	
2020–21	4	3ª	11th / 9th	
2021–22	6	Int. Pref.	2nd	
2022–23	5	3ª Fed.	14th	
2023–24	5	3ª Fed.	14th	
2024–25	5	3ª Fed.	4th	

- 31 seasons in Tercera División
- 3 seasons in Tercera Federación
