= Santa Úrsula =

- Municipality
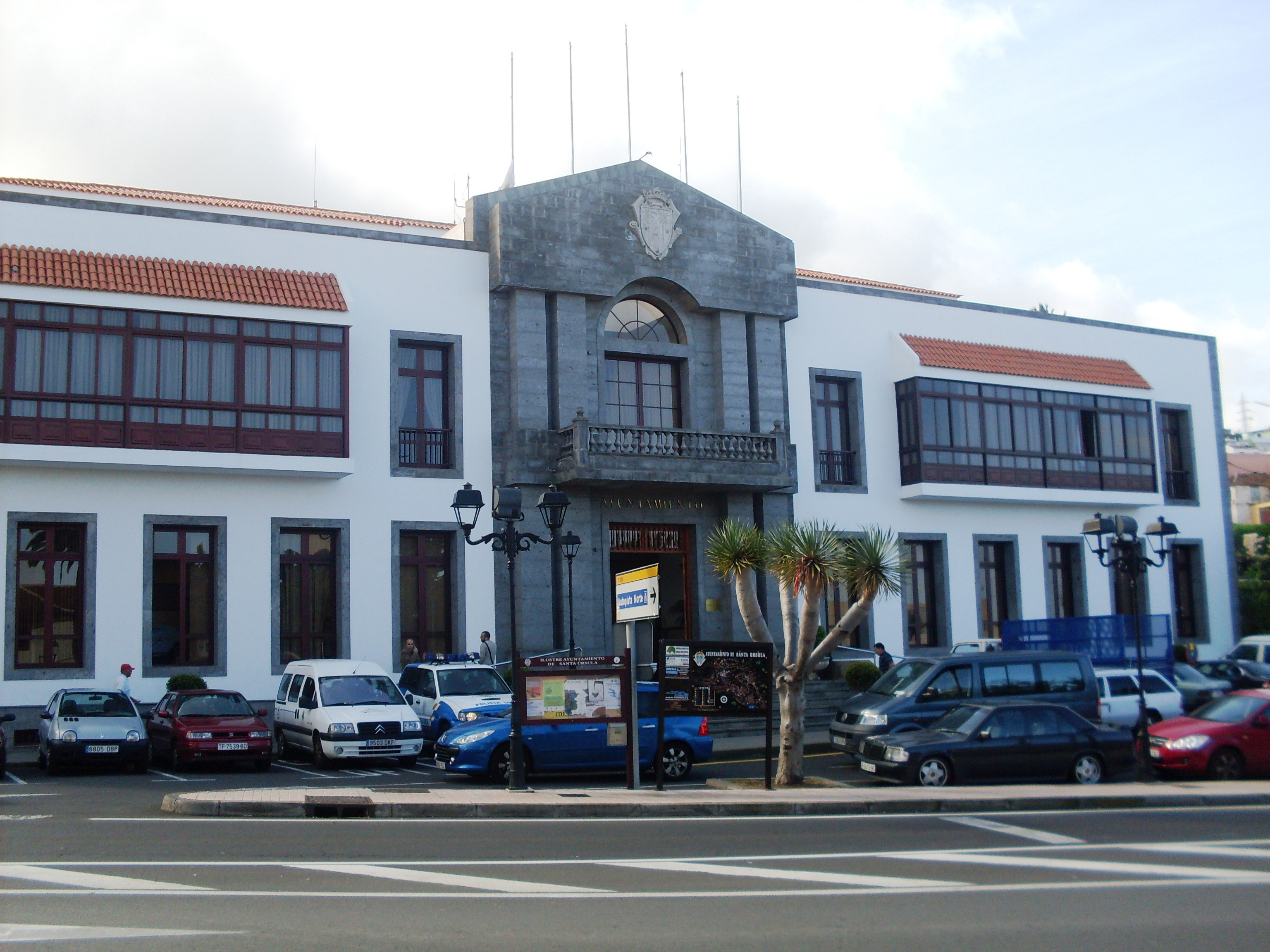
- Town Hall

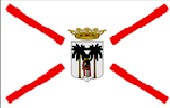
- Flag Coat of arms

- Santa Úrsula in Tenerife

- Location in Province of Santa Cruz de Tenerife Santa Úrsula (Canary Islands) Santa Úrsula (Spain, Canary Islands)
- Coordinates: 28°25′30″N 16°29′30″W
- Country: Spain
- Autonomous Community: Canary Islands
- Province: Tenerife
- Island: Tenerife

Government
  - Mayor: Milagros Pérez de León (PP)

Area
  - Total: 22.59 km^{2} (8.72 sq mi)
- Elevation (AMSL): 290 m (950 ft)

Population (2025-01-01)
  - Total: 15,429
  - Density: 683.0/km^{2} (1,769/sq mi)
- Time zone: UTC+0 (CET)
  - Summer (DST): UTC+1 (CEST (GMT +1))
- Postal code: 38390
- Area code: +34 (Spain) + 922 (Tenerife)
- Climate: BSh
- Website: www.santaursula.es

Santa Úrsula (Spanish pronunciation: [ˈsanta ˈuɾsula]; named after Saint Ursula) is a town and a municipality on the north coast of Tenerife. It is located 6 km east of Puerto de la Cruz and 24 km west of the island's capital, Santa Cruz de Tenerife. The population is 14,545 (2013) and the area is 22.59 km^{2}. The elevation is 290 m. The TF-5 motorway passes through the municipality.

== Historical population ==
Year	Population
1991	8,599
1996	9,591
2001	10,803
2002	11,571
2003	11,959
2004	12,237
2013	14,545
2018	14,445

== See also ==
- List of municipalities in Santa Cruz de Tenerife
