= 2022–23 UD Ibiza season =

UD Ibiza
2022–23 season
- President: Amadeo Salvo
- Head coach: Javier Baraja (until 22 October); Juan Antonio Anquela (from 24 October until 23 November); Carlos Sánchez (caretaker, 26–28 November); Lucas Alcaraz (from 28 November)
- Stadium: Can Misses
- Segunda División: 21st (relegated)
- Copa del Rey: Second round
- Top goalscorer: League: Cristian Herrera (9); All: Cristian Herrera (10)
- Biggest defeat: Ibiza 0–5 Albacete
Home colours	Away colours

The 2022–23 season was UD Ibiza's eighth season in existence and the club's second consecutive season in the second division of Spanish football. In addition to the domestic league, Ibiza participated in this season's edition of the Copa del Rey. The season covered the period from 1 July 2022 to 30 June 2023.

== Players ==
=== Current squad ===
As of 2 February 2023.

Note: Flags indicate national team as defined under FIFA eligibility rules; some limited exceptions apply. Players may hold more than one non-FIFA nationality.

No.	Pos.	Nation	Player
1	GK	ESP	Germán Parreño
2	DF	ESP	Fran Grima (captain)
3	DF	ESP	Martín Pascual (vice-captain; on loan from Rayo Vallecano)
4	MF	ESP	Javi Serrano (on loan from Atlético Madrid)
5	MF	SEN	Pape Diop
6	DF	ARG	Fausto Grillo
7	FW	ESP	Cristian Herrera
8	MF	POL	Mateusz Bogusz (on loan from Leeds United)
9	FW	ESP	Nolito
10	FW	ESP	Ekain Zenitagoia
12	DF	ESP	Javi Vázquez
13	GK	BRA	Daniel Fuzato
14	MF	ESP	Iván Morante

No.	Pos.	Nation	Player
15	DF	ESP	Juan Ibiza
16	FW	ESP	Kaxe
18	DF	ARG	Marcos Mauro
19	FW	CZE	Lukáš Juliš
20	MF	MTQ	Kévin Appin
21	MF	CHI	Williams Alarcón (on loan from Unión La Calera)
23	DF	ESP	Coke
24	DF	ARG	Gonzalo Escobar
26	GK	ESP	Jorge Chanza
28	FW	ESP	Suleiman Camara
29	MF	ESP	Isma Ruiz (on loan from Granada)
30	DF	ESP	Joseda Menargues

=== Reserve team ===
Note: Flags indicate national team as defined under FIFA eligibility rules; some limited exceptions apply. Players may hold more than one non-FIFA nationality.

No.	Pos.	Nation	Player
31	FW	ESP	Álex Sánchez
32	MF	ESP	Andrés Palacios

No.	Pos.	Nation	Player
33	MF	ESP	Xairo Soto

=== Out on loan ===
Note: Flags indicate national team as defined under FIFA eligibility rules; some limited exceptions apply. Players may hold more than one non-FIFA nationality.

No.	Pos.	Nation	Player
—	MF	ENG	Armando Shashoua (at Córdoba until 30 June 2023)

== Transfers ==
=== In ===
Date	Player	From	Type	Fee	Ref
1 July 2022	(Spain) Suleiman Camara	Girona	Transfer	Free	
1 July 2022	(Brazil) Daniel Fuzato	(Italy) Roma	Transfer	Free	
1 July 2022	(Spain) Álvaro García	Espanyol	Loan		
3 July 2022	(Spain) Martín Pascual	Rayo Vallecano	Loan		
5 July 2022	(Spain) Darío Poveda	Getafe	Loan		
11 July 2022	(Portugal) Zé Carlos	(Portugal) Braga	Loan		
12 July 2022	(England) Armando Shashoua	Atlético Baleares	Transfer	Free	
19 July 2022	(Spain) Iván Morante	Real Madrid Castilla	Transfer	Undisclosed	
19 August 2022	(Spain) Isma Ruiz	Granada	Loan		
31 August 2022	(Poland) Mateusz Bogusz	(England) Leeds United	Loan		
1 September 2022	(England) Miguel Azeez	(England) Arsenal	Loan		
1 September 2022	(Spain) Coke	Levante	Transfer	Free	
5 September 2022	(Spain) Nolito	Celta Vigo	Transfer	Free	
29 December 2022	(Argentina) Marcos Mauro	(Mexico) Juárez	Transfer	Undisclosed	
2 January 2023	(Spain) Joseda Menargues	Valencia B	Transfer	Undisclosed	
4 January 2023	(Argentina) Fausto Grillo	(Chile) O'Higgins	Transfer	Undisclosed	
4 January 2023	(Spain) Kaxe	Atlético Baleares	Transfer	Undisclosed	
15 January 2023	(Czech Republic) Lukáš Juliš	(Czech Republic) Sparta Prague	Transfer	Undisclosed	
31 January 2023	(Chile) Williams Alarcón	(Chile) Unión La Calera	Loan		
31 January 2023	(Spain) Javi Serrano	Atlético Madrid	Loan		

=== Out ===
Date	Player	To	Type	Fee	Ref
1 July 2022	(Spain) David Álvarez	(Poland) Wisła Płock	Transfer	Free	
1 July 2022	(Spain) Rubén González	Racing de Santander	Transfer	Free	
1 July 2022	(Spain) Javi Lara	Alcorcón	Transfer	Free	
1 July 2022	(Spain) Manu Molina	Zaragoza	Transfer	Free	
1 July 2022	(Spain) David Morillas	Alcorcón	Transfer	Free	
20 August 2022	(Spain) Ángel Rodado	(Poland) Wisła Kraków	Transfer	Undisclosed	
25 August 2022	(Spain) Raúl Sánchez	Castellón	Transfer	Undisclosed	
30 August 2022	(Spain) Javi Pérez	Burgos	Transfer	Free	
8 September 2022	(Spain) Nono	Released			
19 January 2023	(Spain) Darío Poveda	Getafe	Loan return		
26 January 2023	(Spain) David Goldar	Burgos	Transfer	Free	
30 January 2023	(Spain) Sergio Castel	Burgos	Transfer	Free	

== Pre-season and friendlies ==
Win Draw Loss Fixtures

== Competitions ==
=== Overview ===
Competition	First match	Last match	Starting round	Final position	Record							
Competition	First match	Last match	Starting round	Final position	Pld	W	D	L	GF	GA	GD	Win %
Segunda División	14 August 2022	27 May 2023	Matchday 1		42	7	13	22	33	66	−33	16.67
Copa del Rey	12 November 2022	21 December 2022	First round	Second round	2	1	0	1	4	3	+1	50.00
Total					44	8	13	23	37	69	−32	18.18

Source: Competitions

=== Segunda División ===
==== League table ====
Pos	Team	Pld	W	D	L	GF	GA	GD	Pts	Qualification or relegation
18	Villarreal B	42	13	11	18	49	55	−6	50 (Note: Overall goal difference: Sporting Gijón −5, Villarreal B −6.)	Not eligible for promotion
19	Ponferradina (R)	42	9	17	16	40	53	−13	44 (Note: Ponferradina finished ahead of Málaga on head-to-head goal difference: Málaga 1–0 Ponferradina, Ponferradina 2–0 Málaga.)	Relegation to Primera Federación
20	Málaga (R)	42	10	14	18	37	44	−7	44	Relegation to Primera Federación
21	Ibiza (R)	42	7	13	22	33	66	−33	34	Relegation to Primera Federación
22	Lugo (R)	42	6	13	23	27	57	−30	31	Relegation to Primera Federación

Source: LaLiga SmartBank
Rules for classification: 1) points; 2) head-to-head points; 3) head-to-head goal difference; 4) goal difference; 5) number of goals scored
(R) Relegated
Notes:

Notes

1. Reserve teams are not eligible for promotion to the same league as the first team.

==== Results summary ====
Overall								Home						Away					
Pld	W	D	L	GF	GA	GD	Pts	W	D	L	GF	GA	GD	W	D	L	GF	GA	GD
42	7	13	22	33	66	−33	34	5	7	9	21	31	−10	2	6	13	12	35	−23

==== Results by round ====
Round	1	2	3	4	5	6	7	8	9	10	11	12	13	14	15	16	17	18	19	20	21	22	23	24	25	26	27	28	29	30	31	32	33	34	35	36	37	38	39	40	41	42
Ground	H	A	H	A	H	A	A	H	A	H	A	H	A	H	H	A	H	A	H	H	A	A	H	A	H	A	H	A	H	A	H	A	H	A	H	A	H	A	H	A	H	A
Result	L	L	D	L	W	W	L	W	D	L	L	L	L	L	D	L	L	L	W	D	L	L	L	L	D	D	D	L	D	W	D	D	W	D	L	L	L	L	L	D	W	D
Position	21	20	18	20	18	18	18	14	13	16	17	20	20	21	21	21	22	22	22	22	22	22	22	22	22	22	22	22	22	21	21	21	21	21	21	21	21	21	21	21	21	21

A = Away; H = Home; W = Win; D = Draw; L = Loss

==== Matches ====
The league fixtures were announced on 23 June 2022.

14 August 2022 1	Ibiza	0–2	Granada	Ibiza
CEST (UTC+2)				Stadium: Estadi Municipal de Can Misses

22 August 2022 2	Ponferradina	2–1	Ibiza	Ponferrada
CEST (UTC+2)				Stadium: El Toralín

28 August 2022 3	Ibiza	1–1	Alavés	Ibiza
CEST (UTC+2)				Stadium: Estadi Municipal de Can Misses

4 September 2022 4	Huesca	3–0	Ibiza	Huesca
CEST (UTC+2)

11 September 2022 5	Ibiza	1–0	Tenerife	Ibiza
CEST (UTC+2)				Stadium: Estadi Municipal de Can Misses

17 September 2022 6	Oviedo	0–1	Ibiza	Oviedo
CEST (UTC+2)

23 September 2022 7	Sporting Gijón	2–1	Ibiza	Gijón
CEST (UTC+2)				Stadium: El Molinón

2 October 2022 8	Ibiza	3–2	Lugo	Ibiza
CEST (UTC+2)				Stadium: Estadi Municipal de Can Misses

8 October 2022 9	Las Palmas	0–0	Ibiza	Las Palmas
CEST (UTC+2)				Stadium: Estadio Gran Canaria

13 October 2022 10	Ibiza	1–2	Eibar	Ibiza
CEST (UTC+2)				Stadium: Estadi Municipal de Can Misses

16 October 2022 11	Cartagena	2–0	Ibiza	Cartagena
CEST (UTC+2)				Stadium: Estadio Cartagonova

22 October 2022 12	Ibiza	1–2	Levante	Ibiza
CEST (UTC+2)				Stadium: Estadi Municipal de Can Misses

29 October 2022 13	Burgos	2–0	Ibiza	Burgos
CEST (UTC+2)

1 November 2022 14	Ibiza	0–2	Leganés	Ibiza
CET (UTC+1)				Stadium: Estadi Municipal de Can Misses

6 November 2022 15	Ibiza	1–1	Mirandés	Ibiza
CET (UTC+1)				Stadium: Estadi Municipal de Can Misses

20 November 2022 16	Villarreal B	1–0	Ibiza	Villarreal
CET (UTC+1)

28 November 2022 17	Ibiza	0–1	Andorra	Ibiza
CET (UTC+1)				Stadium: Estadi Municipal de Can Misses

3 December 2022 18	Zaragoza	2–1	Ibiza	Zaragoza
CET (UTC+1)

8 December 2022 19	Ibiza	1–0	Racing Santander	Ibiza
CET (UTC+1)				Stadium: Estadi Municipal de Can Misses

11 December 2022 20	Ibiza	1–1	Málaga	Ibiza
CET (UTC+1)				Stadium: Estadi Municipal de Can Misses

18 December 2022 21	Albacete	4–0	Ibiza	Albacete
CET (UTC+1)

8 January 2023 22	Eibar	1–0	Ibiza	Eibar
CET (UTC+1)				Stadium: Ipurua

14 January 2023 23	Ibiza	1–2	Las Palmas	Ibiza
CET (UTC+1)				Stadium: Estadi Municipal de Can Misses

21 January 2023 24	Granada	2–0	Ibiza	Granada
CET (UTC+1)				Stadium: Nuevo Los Cármenes

29 January 2023 25	Ibiza	2–2	Cartagena	Ibiza
CET (UTC+1)				Stadium: Estadi Municipal de Can Misses

5 February 2023 26	Lugo	0–0	Ibiza	Lugo
CET (UTC+1)

12 February 2023 27	Ibiza	1–1	Ponferradina	Ibiza
CET (UTC+1)				Stadium: Estadi Municipal de Can Misses

19 February 2023 28	Alavés	4–2	Ibiza	Vitoria-Gasteiz
CET (UTC+1)				Stadium: Mendizorrotza

26 February 2023 29	Ibiza	2–2	Huesca	Ibiza
CET (UTC+1)				Stadium: Estadi Municipal de Can Misses

5 March 2023 30	Leganés	0–1	Ibiza	Leganés
CET (UTC+1)				Stadium: Butarque

11 March 2023 31	Ibiza	0–0	Villarreal B	Ibiza
CET (UTC+1)				Stadium: Estadi Municipal de Can Misses

18 March 2023 32	Andorra	2–2	Ibiza	Andorra la Vella
CET (UTC+1)				Stadium: Estadi Nacional

25 March 2023 33	Ibiza	2–0	Burgos	Ibiza
CET (UTC+1)				Stadium: Estadi Municipal de Can Misses

2 April 2023 34	Mirandés	2–2	Ibiza	Miranda de Ebro
CEST (UTC+2)				Stadium: Anduva

8 April 2023 35	Ibiza	1–3	Sporting Gijón	Ibiza
CEST (UTC+2)				Stadium: Estadi Municipal de Can Misses

16 April 2023 36	Tenerife	4–0	Ibiza	Santa Cruz de Tenerife
CEST (UTC+2)				Stadium: Heliodoro Rodríguez López

22 April 2023 37	Ibiza	1–2	Oviedo	Ibiza
21:00 CEST (UTC+2)		Report		Stadium: Estadi Municipal de Can Misses; Referee: Rubén Ávalos Barrera

28 April 2023 38	Racing Santander	1–0	Ibiza	Santander
21:00 CEST (UTC+2)		Report		Stadium: Campos de Sport de El Sardinero; Referee: Óliver de la Fuente Ramos

7 May 2023 39	Ibiza	0–5	Albacete	Ibiza
16:15 CEST (UTC+2)		Report		Stadium: Estadi Municipal de Can Misses; Referee: Rafael Sánchez López

15 May 2023 40	Levante	0–0	Ibiza	Valencia
21:00 CEST (UTC+2)		Report		Stadium: Estadi Ciutat de València; Referee: Luis Mario Milla Alvendiz

20 May 2023 41	Ibiza	1–0	Zaragoza	Ibiza
16:15 CEST (UTC+2)	Álex 70'	Report		Stadium: Estadi Municipal de Can Misses; Referee: Iosu Galech Apezteguía

27 May 2023 42	Málaga	1–1	Ibiza	Málaga
18:30 CEST (UTC+2)	Appiah 61'	Report	Ibiza 90'	Stadium: La Rosaleda; Referee: Álvaro Moreno Aragón

=== Copa del Rey ===
12 November 2022 First round	Cristo Atlético	0–2 (a.e.t.)	Ibiza	Palencia
20:00 CET (UTC+1)		Report	Herrera 98'; Camara 119'	Stadium: Nueva Balastera; Referee: Adrián Cordero Vega

21 December 2022 Second round	Ceuta	3–2	Ibiza	Ceuta
21:00 CET (UTC+1)	González 14', 48'; Rodri 21'	Report	Lafarge 5' (o.g.); Ekain 49'	Stadium: Alfonso Murube; Referee: Luis Mario Milla Alvendiz
