= 2022 Segunda División RFEF play-offs =

The 2022 Segunda División RFEF play-offs (Playoffs de Ascenso or Promoción de Ascenso) were the final play-offs for promotion from 2021–22 Segunda División RFEF to the 2022–23 Primera División RFEF.

== Venues ==
On 11 March 2022, the Province of Alicante was announced as the venue for the promotion play-off, initially the cities of Alicante and La Nucía were confirmed. On 3 May 2022, the cities of Alcoy, Benidorm and Elda were added as the other play-off venues.

Alcoy	Alicante	Benidorm	Elda
Estadio El Collao	Estadio José Rico Pérez	Estadio Municipal Guillermo Amor	Estadio Municipal Nuevo Pepico Amat
Capacity: 4,850	Capacity: 29,500	Capacity: 9,000	Capacity: 4,036
2022 Segunda División RFEF play-offs is located in Province of Alicante
2022 Segunda División RFEF play-offs is located in Province of Alicante		La Nucía	
2022 Segunda División RFEF play-offs is located in Province of Alicante		Estadi Olímpic Camilo Cano	Ciudad Deportiva Camilo Cano
2022 Segunda División RFEF play-offs is located in Province of Alicante		Capacity: 5,000	Capacity: 1,600

== Format ==
Twenty teams participated in the promotion play-off. Each of the five groups of the Segunda División RFEF were represented by the four teams that finished the regular season between the second and fifth positions. In the draw for the first stage, the participating teams were assigned to pots corresponding to their final regular season position. While avoiding matches between teams from the same regular season group, second-place finishers were drawn against fifth-place finishers while teams that finished third would play teams that finished fourth. The same draw process was repeated, to the extent that it would be possible, in the draw for the second round.

The five winning clubs of the second stage attained promotion to Primera RFEF and accompanied the five group champions who had already achieved their promotion.

The final two relegation spots (of 27 total) were also determined via play-offs. The four 13th-place finishers with the lowest point totals were drawn into two single-leg matches, with the winners securing survival in the Segunda División RFEF and the losers being relegated to the Tercera División RFEF. The two match-ups were selected through a random draw and hosted at a venue chosen from among the stadiums selected to host the promotion play-offs.

== Promotion play-offs ==
=== Teams ===
==== Participating teams ====
- Arenas de Getxo
- Cacereño
- Ceuta
- Coria
- Coruxo
- Cristo Atlético
- Eldense
- Espanyol B
- Hércules
- La Nucía
- Lleida
- Mérida
- Murcia
- Navalcarnero
- Peña Deportiva
- Rayo Cantabria
- Real Sociedad C
- Sestao River
- Teruel
- Unión Adarve

==== Road to the play-offs ====
===== Group 1 =====
Pos	Team	Pld	W	D	L	GF	GA	GD	Pts	Qualification
2	Unión Adarve (Y)	34	17	10	7	54	39	+15	**61**	Qualification for the promotion play–offs and Copa del Rey
3	Navalcarnero (Y)	34	17	6	11	41	32	+9	**57**	Qualification for the promotion play–offs and Copa del Rey
4	Coruxo (Y)	34	14	10	10	46	32	+14	**52 (Note: Coruxo is ahead of Cristo Atlético on head-to-head points: Coruxo–Cristo Atlético 3–1, Cristo Atlético–Coruxo 2–1)**	Qualification for the promotion play–offs and Copa del Rey
5	Cristo Atlético (Y)	34	14	10	10	51	41	+10	**52**	Qualification for the promotion play–offs and Copa del Rey

Updated to match(es) played on 15 May 2022. Source: SoccerWay
Rules for classification: 1) points; 2) head-to-head points; 3) head-to-head goal difference; 4) goal difference; 5) number of goals scored
(Y) Assured qualification to the Copa del Rey

===== Group 2 =====
Pos	Team	Pld	W	D	L	GF	GA	GD	Pts	Qualification
2	Sestao River (Y)	34	20	10	4	53	22	+31	**70**	Qualification for the promotion play–offs and Copa del Rey
3	Real Sociedad C	34	15	14	5	55	30	+25	**59**	Qualification for the promotion play–offs
4	Rayo Cantabria	34	15	11	8	42	29	+13	**56 (Note: Rayo Cantabria is ahead of Arenas on head-to-head points: Rayo Cantabria–Arenas 1–0, Arenas–Rayo Cantabria 0–2)**	Qualification for the promotion play–offs
5	Arenas (Y)	34	14	14	6	42	25	+17	**56**	Qualification for the promotion play–offs and Copa del Rey

Updated to match(es) played on 15 May 2022. Source: SoccerWay
Rules for classification: 1) points; 2) head-to-head points; 3) head-to-head goal difference; 4) goal difference; 5) number of goals scored
(Y) Assured qualification to the Copa del Rey

===== Group 3 =====
Pos	Team	Pld	W	D	L	GF	GA	GD	Pts	Qualification
2	Espanyol B	34	17	6	11	54	46	+8	**57**	Qualification for the promotion play–offs
3	Peña Deportiva (Y)	34	15	11	8	45	33	+12	**56**	Qualification for the promotion play–offs and Copa del Rey
4	Teruel (Y)	34	13	13	8	36	37	−1	**52 (Note: Teruel is ahead of Lleida Esportiu on head-to-head points: Teruel–Lleida Esportiu 1–0, Lleida Esportiu–Teruel 0–0)**	Qualification for the promotion play–offs and Copa del Rey
5	Lleida Esportiu (Y)	34	15	7	12	38	39	−1	**52**	Qualification for the promotion play–offs and Copa del Rey

Updated to match(es) played on 15 May 2022. Source: SoccerWay
Rules for classification: 1) points; 2) head-to-head points; 3) head-to-head goal difference; 4) goal difference; 5) number of goals scored
(Y) Qualification to the Copa del Rey

===== Group 4 =====
Pos	Team	Pld	W	D	L	GF	GA	GD	Pts	Qualification
2	Mérida (P, Y)	34	18	8	8	49	26	+23	**62**	Qualification for the promotion play-offs and Copa del Rey
3	Cacereño (Y)	34	17	10	7	48	37	+11	**61**	Qualification for the promotion play-offs and Copa del Rey
4	Ceuta (P, Y)	34	14	12	8	46	32	+14	**54**	Qualification for the promotion play-offs and Copa del Rey
5	Coria (Y)	34	15	8	11	42	40	+2	**53**	Qualification for the promotion play-offs and Copa del Rey

Updated to match(es) played on 15 May 2022. Source: SoccerWay
Rules for classification: 1) points; 2) head-to-head points; 3) head-to-head goal difference; 4) goal difference; 5) number of goals scored
(P) Promoted; (Y) Assured of qualification to the Copa del Rey

===== Group 5 =====
Pos	Team	Pld	W	D	L	GF	GA	GD	Pts	Qualification
2	La Nucía (P, Y)	34	18	10	6	41	18	+23	**64**	Qualification for the promotion play–offs and Copa del Rey
3	Murcia (P, Y)	34	15	13	6	42	27	+15	**58**	Qualification for the promotion play–offs and Copa del Rey
4	Eldense (P, Y)	34	15	11	8	47	37	+10	**56 (Note: Eldense is ahead of Hércules on head-to-head points: Eldense–Hércules 2–2, Hércules–Eldense 0–1)**	Qualification for the promotion play–offs and Copa del Rey
5	Hércules (Y)	34	15	11	8	41	31	+10	**56**	Qualification for the promotion play–offs and Copa del Rey

Updated to match(es) played on 15 May 2022. Source: SoccerWay
Rules for classification: 1) points; 2) head-to-head points; 3) head-to-head goal difference; 4) goal difference; 5) number of goals scored
(P) Promoted; (Y) Assured of qualification to the Copa del Rey

=== First round ===
==== Qualified teams ====
Group	Position	Team
1	2nd	**Unión Adarve**
2	2nd	**Sestao River**
3	2nd	Espanyol B
4	2nd	**Mérida**
5	2nd	**La Nucía**

Group	Position	Team
1	3rd	Navalcarnero
2	3rd	Real Sociedad C
3	3rd	**Peña Deportiva**
4	3rd	Cacereño
5	3rd	**Murcia**

Group	Position	Team
1	4th	Coruxo
2	4th	Rayo Cantabria
3	4th	**Teruel**
4	4th	**Ceuta**
5	4th	**Eldense**

Group	Position	Team
1	5th	Cristo Atlético
2	5th	**Arenas de Getxo**
3	5th	Lleida Esportiu
4	5th	Coria
5	5th	Hércules

Bold indicates teams that advanced to the second round

==== Matches ====
Team 1	Score	Team 2
Espanyol B	2–4	**Arenas de Getxo**
**Sestao River** (s) (a.e.t.)	0–0	Lleida Esportiu
**La Nucía**	2–0	Coria
**Unión Adarve** (s) (a.e.t.)	1–1	Hércules
**Mérida**	2–1	Cristo Atlético
**Murcia**	1–0	Rayo Cantabria
Real Sociedad C	0–1	**Eldense**
**Peña Deportiva** (a.e.t.)	2–0	Coruxo
Navalcarnero	0–2	**Ceuta**
Cacereño	0–4	**Teruel**

21 May 2022	Espanyol B	**2–4**	**Arenas de Getxo**	La Nucía
19:30 UTC+2	Mahicas 78', 87'	Report	Rozas 13'; Izeta 23', 45'; Gabriel 41'	Stadium: Ciudad Deportiva Camilo Cano; Referee: Johan González Rodríguez

21 May 2022	Sestao River	**0–0** (a.e.t.)	Lleida Esportiu	Elda
19:30 UTC+2		Report		Stadium: Estadio Municipal Nuevo Pepico Amat; Referee: Carlos Muñiz Muñoz

21 May 2022	**La Nucía**	**2–0**	Coria	Benidorm
21:30 UTC+2	Mas 82'; Pina 90+3'	Report		Stadium: Estadio Municipal Guillermo Amor; Referee: Pol Godia Solé

21 May 2022	Unión Adarve	**1–1** (a.e.t.)	Hércules	Alicante
21:30 UTC+2	Tellechea 10'	Report	Borja Galán 26'	Stadium: Estadio José Rico Pérez; Referee: Imanol Irurtzun Artola

21 May 2022	**Mérida**	**2–1**	Cristo Atlético	Alcoy
21:30 UTC+2	Diego 20'; Camps 90+2'	Report	Silva 74'	Stadium: Estadio El Collao; Referee: Gerard Brull Acerete

22 May 2022	**Murcia**	**1–0**	Rayo Cantabria	Alicante
19:30 UTC+2	Carrasco 8'	Report		Stadium: Estadio José Rico Pérez; Referee: Javier Figueiredo Comesaña

22 May 2022	Real Sociedad C	**0–1**	**Eldense**	Benidorm
19:30 UTC+2		Report	50' Eliseo	Stadium: Estadio Municipal Guillermo Amor; Referee: Aleksandar Ivaylov Angelov Borisov

22 May 2022	**Peña Deportiva**	**2–0** (a.e.t.)	Coruxo	La Nucía
19:30 UTC+2	Chinchilla 92'; López 108'	Report		Stadium: Ciudad Deportiva Camilo Cano; Referee: Juan Antonio Manrique Antequera

22 May 2022	Navalcarnero	**0–2**	**Ceuta**	Alcoy
19:30 UTC+2		Report	Pito Camacho 20'; Ismael 31'	Stadium: Estadio El Collao; Referee: Francisco García Riesgo

22 May 2022	Cacereño	**0–4**	**Teruel**	Elda
19:30 UTC+2		Report	Guille Andrés 22'; David Aparicio 37'; Emaná 63'; Tatín 89'	Stadium: Estadio Municipal Nuevo Pepico Amat; Referee: Ekaitz Iñiki García Arriola

=== Second round ===
==== Qualified teams ====
Group	Position	Team
1	2nd	Unión Adarve
2	2nd	Sestao River
4	2nd	**Mérida**
5	2nd	**La Nucía**

Group	Position	Team
3	3rd	Peña Deportiva
5	3rd	**Murcia**

Group	Position	Team
3	4th	Teruel
4	4th	**Ceuta**
5	4th	**Eldense**

Group	Position	Team
2	5th	Arenas de Getxo

==== Matches ====
Team 1	Score	Team 2
Sestao River	0–1	**Eldense** (a.e.t.)
**La Nucía**	2–1	Arenas de Getxo
**Mérida** (a.e.t.)	2–0	Teruel
Unión Adarve	0–2	**Ceuta**
Peña Deportiva	1–2	**Murcia**

28 May 2022	Sestao River	**0–1** (a.e.t.)	**Eldense**	Elda
18:00			Iván Forte 103'	Stadium: Estadio Municipal Nuevo Pepico Amat; Referee: Manuel Camacho Garrote

28 May 2022	**La Nucía**	**2–1**	Arenas de Getxo	La Nucía
18:00	Javi Cabezas 21'; Javi Martín 90+2'		Xabi Cortezón 84'	Stadium: Estadi Olímpic Camilo Cano; Referee: Eder Mallo Fernández

29 May 2022	**Mérida**	**2–0** (a.e.t.)	Teruel	La Nucía
18:00	José Gaspar 94'; Nacho 105'	Report		Stadium: Estadi Olímpic Camilo Cano; Referee: Juan Francisco Roca Robles

29 May 2022	Unión Adarve	**0–2**	**Ceuta**	Elda
18:00		Report	Iván Guzmán 44'; Pito Camacho 60'	Stadium: Estadio Municipal Nuevo Pepico Amat; Referee: Francisco José Ortega Herrera

29 May 2022	Peña Deportiva	**1–2**	**Murcia**	Alicante
18:00	Sergio Chinchilla 52'	Report	Andrés Carrasco 35'; Pablo Ganet 74'	Stadium: Estadio José Rico Pérez; Referee: Álvaro Rodríguez Recio

Promoted to Primera División RFEF
**Ceuta**	**Eldense**	**La Nucía**	**Mérida**	**Murcia**

== Promoted teams ==
- The five teams that were or would be promoted to Primera División RFEF through regular season groups and the five play-off winners were included.
- The number of years after the last participation of the club in the third tier is referred to the previous appearance at that level, where Segunda División B was replaced by the Primera División RFEF.

Promoted to Primera División RFEF
Group 1	Group 2	Group 3	Group 4	Group 5
Pontevedra (1st) (One year later)	Osasuna B (1st) (One year later)	Numancia (1st) (One year later)	Córdoba (1st) (One year later)	Intercity (1st) (First time ever)
			Mérida (2nd) (One year later)	La Nucía (2nd) (One year later)
			Ceuta (4th) (52 years later)	Murcia (3rd) (One year later)
				Eldense (4th) (5 years later)

== Relegation play-offs ==
=== Table of 13th-placed teams ===
Pos	Team	Pld	W	D	L	GF	GA	GD	Pts	Qualification or relegation
1	Laredo	34	13	6	15	41	36	+5	45	
2	Cerdanyola del Vallès (R)	34	11	9	14	45	48	−3	42	Qualification for the relegation play-offs
3	Gimnástica Segoviana (O)	34	11	9	14	37	42	−5	42	Qualification for the relegation play-offs
4	Don Benito (O)	34	10	11	13	43	42	+1	41	Qualification for the relegation play-offs
5	Águilas (R)	34	10	11	13	32	36	−4	41	Qualification for the relegation play-offs

Rules for classification: 1) points; 2) goal difference; 3) number of goals scored
(O) Play-off winners; (R) Relegated

=== Play-off ===
==== Qualified teams ====
Group	Position	Team
1	13th	Gimnástica Segoviana
3	13th	Cerdanyola del Vallès
4	13th	Don Benito
5	13th	Águilas

==== Matches ====
Team 1	Score	Team 2
Don Benito (p.)	0–0 (4–2)	Águilas
Cerdanyola del Vallès	1–3	Gimnástica Segoviana

22 May 2022	Don Benito	0–0 (a.e.t.) (4–2 p)	Águilas	La Nucía
12:00 UTC+2		Report		Stadium: Ciudad Deportiva Camilo Cano; Referee: Juan Manuel Gordillo Escamilla

22 May 2022	Cerdanyola del Vallès	1–3	Gimnástica Segoviana	Elda
12:00 UTC+2	Bandeh 52'	Report	Rafa Llorente 37'; Manu 75'; Szymanowski 90+4'	Stadium: Estadio Municipal Nuevo Pepico Amat; Referee: Fulgencio Madrid Martínez

Relegated to Tercera División RFEF
Cerdanyola del Vallès	Águilas

== Relegated teams ==
- 27 teams relegated to Tercera División RFEF: 25 teams through regular season groups and the two play-off losers.
- The number of years after the last participation of the club in the fifth tier is referred to the previous appearance in the Divisiones Regionales, the divisions that were replaced by Tercera División RFEF.

Relegated to Tercera División RFEF
Ceares (19 years later)	Peña Sport (45 years later)	Ejea (16 years later)	Tamaraceite (4 years later)	Toledo (35 years later)
Arosa (9 years later)	Ardoi (8 years later)	Huesca B (2 years later)	Panadería Pulido (6 years later)	Calvo Sotelo (4 years later)
Llanera (6 years later)	Náxara (18 years later)	Europa (17 years later)	San Fernando (7 years later)	Marchamalo (2 years later)
Salamanca (5 years later)	Tropezón (31 years later)	Badalona (21 years later)	Las Palmas Atlético (45 years later)	Atlético Pulpileño (7 years later)
Móstoles URJC (8 years later)	Cayón (14 years later)	Andratx (3 years later)	Mensajero (14 years later)	Atlético Levante (23 years later)
				Águilas (11 years later)
