= Alex Sánchez =

Alex or Álex Sánchez or Sanchez may refer to:

- Alex Sánchez (footballer, born 1930) (1930–2025), Costa Rican footballer
- Alex Sanchez (author) (born 1957) American teen author
- Alex Sanchez (pitcher) (born 1966), American baseball player
- Alex Sánchez (boxer) (born 1973) Puerto Rican boxer
- Alex Sánchez (outfielder) (born 1976), Cuban baseball player
- Álex Sánchez (footballer, born 1989), Spanish footballer
- Álex Sánchez (footballer, born 1991), Spanish footballer
- Álex Sánchez (footballer, born 2004), Spanish footballer
- Álex Sánchez (footballer, born 2006), Spanish footballer
- Alex Sanchez (comics), alter ego of the superhero Firebrand from DC Comics

== See also ==
- Alexis Sánchez (born 1988), Chilean footballer
- Alexis Sánchez (hurdler) (born 1971), Spanish hurdler
- Alexander Sánchez (born 1984), Peruvian footballer
- Alejandro Sánchez (disambiguation)
