= Alejandro Sánchez =

Alejandro Sánchez may refer to:

- Alejandro Sánchez (hurdler) (born 1949), Mexican hurdler
- Alejandro Sánchez (baseball) (born 1959), Dominican baseball outfielder
- Alejandro Sánchez Camacho (born 1960), Mexican politician from the Federal District
- Alejandro Sánchez Alvarado (born 1964), Venezuelan-American molecular biologist
- Alejandro Sánchez (footballer, born 1970), Spanish footballer
- Alejandro Sánchez Domínguez (born 1975), Mexican politician from the State of Mexico
- Alejandro Sánchez Pereira (born 1980), Uruguayan politician
- Alejandro Sánchez (footballer, born 1986), Argentine footballer
- Alejandro Sánchez Palomero (born 1986), Spanish swimmer
- Alejandro Sánchez del Barco (born 1993), Spanish dressage rider

== See also ==
- Alex Sánchez (disambiguation)
- Alexander Sánchez (born 1984), Peruvian footballer
