= Xairo Rial =

Spanish footballer

Personal information
- Full name: Xairo Rial Soto
- Date of birth: 16 February 2005 (age 21)
- Place of birth: Ibiza, Spain
- Position: Midfielder

Team information
- Current team: Sant Jordi
- Number: 17

Youth career
- 2013–2018: Sant Jordi
- 2018–2024: Ibiza

Senior career*
Years	Team	Apps	(Gls)
2023–2024	Ibiza	1	(0)
2024	Ibiza B	3	(0)
2024–	Sant Jordi	2	(0)
- * Club domestic league appearances and goals as of 5 October 2024

Xairo Rial Soto (born 16 February 2005), sometimes known as just Xairo, is a Spanish footballer who plays as a midfielder for PE Sant Jordi.

== Club career ==
Xairo is a youth product of hometown side UD Ibiza, having previously played for PE Sant Jordi. In February 2023, he and Juvenil teammates Álex Sánchez and Sergi Chazarra started training with the main squad.

Xairo made his first team – and professional – debut at the age of 18 on 27 May 2023, coming on as a late substitute for Williams Alarcón in a 1–1 Segunda División away draw against Málaga CF, as both sides were already relegated. In August 2024, after finishing his formation, he returned to his former club Sant Jordi and was assigned to the main squad in Tercera Federación.
