= Vassilakis =

Vassilakis (Greek: Βασιλάκης) is a Greek surname. Notable people with the surname include:

- Adamantios Vassilakis (1942–2021), Greek diplomat
- Christian Vassilakis (born 2001), Spanish footballer
- Panayiotis Vassilakis (1925–2019), also known as Takis, Greek artist

See also

MV Vassilakis (1937), a Greek cargo ship
