= 2021–22 Segunda División RFEF =

Segunda División RFEF
- Season: 2021–22
- Dates: 4 September 2021 – 15 May 2022
- Promoted: Ceuta; Córdoba; Eldense; Intercity; La Nucía; Mérida; Murcia; Numancia; Osasuna B Pontevedra
- Relegated: Águilas; Andratx; Ardoi; Arosa; Atlético Levante; Atlético Pulpileño; Badalona; Calvo Sotelo Puertollano; Cayón; Ceares; Ejea; Europa; Huesca B Las Palmas Atlético; Llanera; Marchamalo; Mensajero; Móstoles URJC; Náxara; Panadería Pulido; Peña Sport; Salamanca; San Fernando; Tamaraceite; Toledo; Tropezón
- Top goalscorer: Charles (19 goals)

The 2021–22 Segunda División RFEF season was the first for the Segunda División RFEF, the new fourth highest level in the Spanish football league system. It supplanted Tercera División, which downgraded to the fifth tier as Tercera División RFEF and succeeded the old Segunda División B, which was replaced by Primera División RFEF as the third level of the pyramid. Ninety teams will participate, divided into five groups of eighteen clubs each based on geographical proximity. In each group, the champions automatically promoted to Primera División RFEF, and the second to fifth placers will play promotion play-offs. The last five teams in each group will be relegated to the Tercera División RFEF; in addition, the four worst teams classified 13th in their group will play play-offs to define the last two relegation places.

== Overview before the season ==
A total of 90 teams will join the league: 36 from the 2020–21 Segunda División B and 54 promoted from the 2020–21 Tercera División. The final groups were defined on 20 June 2021, with 18 teams divided in five groups.

Teams retained from 2020–21 Segunda División B

- Arenas de Getxo
- Atlético Levante
- Badalona
- Cádiz B
- Compostela
- Córdoba
- Coruxo
- Don Benito
- Ebro
- El Ejido
- Ejea
- Espanyol B
- Hércules
- Izarra
- La Nucía
- Langreo
- Laredo
- Las Palmas Atlético
- Lleida
- Marino de Luanco
- Melilla
- Mérida
- Murcia
- Mutilvera
- Navalcarnero
- Numancia
- Osasuna B
- Peña Deportiva
- Pontevedra
- Prat
- Recreativo Granada
- Salamanca
- Socuéllamos
- Tamaraceite
- Tarazona
- Villanovense

Teams promoted from 2020–21 Tercera División

- Águilas
- Alzira
- Andratx
- Antequera
- Ardoi
- Arenteiro
- Arosa
- Atlético Mancha Real
- Atlético Pulpileño
- Avilés Industrial
- Bergantiños
- Brea
- Burgos Promesas
- Cacereño
- Calvo Sotelo
- Cayón
- Ceares
- Cerdanyola del Vallès
- Ceuta
- Coria
- Cristo Atlético
- Eldense
- Europa
- Formentera
- Gernika
- Gimnástica Segoviana
- Huesca B
- Ibiza Islas Pitiusas
- Intercity
- Leganés B
- Llanera
- UD Logroñés B
- Mar Menor
- Marchamalo
- Mensajero
- Montijo
- Móstoles URJC
- Náxara
- Panadería Pulido
- Peña Sport
- Racing Rioja
- Rayo Cantabria
- Real Sociedad C
- San Fernando
- San Juan
- San Roque de Lepe
- Sestao River
- Terrassa
- Teruel
- Toledo
- Tropezón
- Unión Adarve
- Vélez
- Xerez Deportivo

== Group 1 ==
Location of teams in 2021–22 Segunda División RFEF – Group 1

=== Teams and locations ===
| Team | Home city | Stadium | Capacity |
|---|---|---|---|
| Arenteiro | O Carballiño | Espiñedo | 4,500 |
| Arosa | Vilagarcía de Arousa | A Lomba | 5,000 |
| Avilés Industrial | Avilés | Román Suárez Puerta | 5,400 |
| Bergantiños | Carballo | As Eiroas | 5,000 |
| Ceares | Gijón | La Cruz | 1,500 |
| Compostela | Santiago de Compostela | Vero Boquete | 16,666 |
| Coruxo | Vigo | O Vao | 2,200 |
| Cristo Atlético | Palencia | Nueva Balastera | 8,100 |
| Gimnástica Segoviana | Segovia | La Albuera | 6,000 |
| Langreo | Langreo | Ganzábal | 4,024 |
| Leganés B | Leganés | Anexo de Butarque | 1,750 |
| Llanera | Llanera | Pepe Quimarán | 1,000 |
| Marino Luanco | Luanco | Miramar | 3,500 |
| Móstoles URJC | Móstoles | El Soto | 14,000 |
| Navalcarnero | Navalcarnero | Mariano González | 2,500 |
| Pontevedra | Pontevedra | Pasarón | 12,000 |
| Salamanca | Salamanca | Helmántico | 17,341 |
| Unión Adarve | Madrid | Garcia de La Mata | 1,200 |

=== Standings ===
| Pos | Team | Pld | W | D | L | GF | GA | GD | Pts | Qualification |
|---|---|---|---|---|---|---|---|---|---|---|
| 1 | Pontevedra (C, P, Y) | 34 | 18 | 11 | 5 | 66 | 35 | +31 | 65 | Promotion to Primera División RFEF and qualification for Copa del Rey |
| 2 | Unión Adarve (Y) | 34 | 17 | 10 | 7 | 54 | 39 | +15 | 61 | Qualification for the promotion play–offs and Copa del Rey |
| 3 | Navalcarnero (Y) | 34 | 17 | 6 | 11 | 41 | 32 | +9 | 57 | Qualification for the promotion play–offs and Copa del Rey |
| 4 | Coruxo (Y) | 34 | 14 | 10 | 10 | 46 | 32 | +14 | 52 (Note: Coruxo is ahead of Cristo Atlético on head-to-head points: Coruxo–Cristo Atlético 3–1, Cristo Atlético–Coruxo 2–1) | Qualification for the promotion play–offs and Copa del Rey |
| 5 | Cristo Atlético (Y) | 34 | 14 | 10 | 10 | 51 | 41 | +10 | 52 | Qualification for the promotion play–offs and Copa del Rey |
| 6 | Bergantiños | 34 | 13 | 10 | 11 | 36 | 37 | −1 | 49 | |
| 7 | Leganés B | 34 | 13 | 9 | 12 | 42 | 34 | +8 | 48 | |
| 8 | Compostela | 34 | 11 | 14 | 9 | 47 | 38 | +9 | 47 (Note: Compostela is ahead of Avilés on head-to-head points: Compostela–Avilés 3–2, Avilés–Compostela 2–2) | |
| 9 | Avilés | 34 | 11 | 14 | 9 | 43 | 37 | +6 | 47 | |
| 10 | Arenteiro | 34 | 10 | 15 | 9 | 35 | 35 | 0 | 45 | |
| 11 | Langreo | 34 | 11 | 11 | 12 | 40 | 41 | −1 | 44 | |
| 12 | Marino Luanco | 34 | 12 | 7 | 15 | 38 | 38 | 0 | 43 | |
| 13 | Gimnástica Segoviana | 34 | 11 | 9 | 14 | 37 | 42 | −5 | 42 | Won the relegation play-offs |
| 14 | Móstoles URJC (R) | 34 | 11 | 8 | 15 | 37 | 44 | −7 | 41 (Note: Móstoles URJC is ahead of Salamanca on head-to-head points: Móstoles URJC–Salamanca 2–0, Salamanca–Móstoles URJC 1–0) | Relegation to Tercera División RFEF |
| 15 | Salamanca (R) | 34 | 10 | 11 | 13 | 26 | 29 | −3 | 41 | Relegation to Tercera División RFEF |
| 16 | Llanera (R) | 34 | 11 | 7 | 16 | 39 | 55 | −16 | 40 | Relegation to Tercera División RFEF |
| 17 | Arosa (R) | 34 | 10 | 9 | 15 | 32 | 46 | −14 | 39 | Relegation to Tercera División RFEF |
| 18 | Ceares (R) | 34 | 5 | 3 | 26 | 23 | 78 | −55 | 18 | Relegation to Tercera División RFEF |

Updated to match(es) played on 15 May 2022. Source: SoccerWay
Rules for classification: 1) points; 2) head-to-head points; 3) head-to-head goal difference; 4) goal difference; 5) number of goals scored
(C) Champions; (P) Promoted; (R) Relegated; (Y) Assured qualification to the Copa del Rey

=== Results ===
| Home \ Away | ARE | ARO | AVI | BER | CEA | COM | COR | CRA | GMS | LAN | LEG | LLA | MAR | MOS | NAV | PON | SAL | UAD |
|---|---|---|---|---|---|---|---|---|---|---|---|---|---|---|---|---|---|---|
| Arenteiro | — | 1–1 | 1–0 | 1–0 | 2–0 | 1–1 | 2–1 | 1–2 | 1–1 | 1–1 | 1–0 | 5–1 | 2–4 | 2–1 | 0–0 | 1–5 | 1–0 | 0–1 |
| Arosa | 1–0 | — | 0–0 | 1–1 | 3–1 | 0–1 | 0–1 | 0–3 | 1–0 | 1–3 | 2–2 | 0–0 | 2–1 | 1–0 | 1–0 | 1–1 | 1–0 | 1–1 |
| Avilés | 1–1 | 2–1 | — | 2–2 | 3–1 | 2–2 | 2–3 | 2–2 | 1–1 | 2–2 | 1–0 | 0–0 | 2–1 | 0–1 | 0–1 | 0–3 | 1–0 | 2–1 |
| Bergantiños | 1–1 | 2–1 | 1–3 | — | 0–0 | 3–2 | 0–0 | 1–0 | 1–2 | 0–1 | 1–0 | 1–2 | 0–0 | 2–1 | 0–2 | 2–2 | 2–1 | 2–0 |
| Ceares | 2–0 | 1–4 | 1–0 | 1–0 | — | 0–0 | 1–0 | 0–7 | 1–1 | 0–2 | 0–2 | 0–2 | 0–3 | 1–2 | 0–1 | 1–3 | 1–0 | 0–1 |
| Compostela | 0–0 | 2–1 | 3–2 | 1–1 | 4–1 | — | 1–1 | 3–0 | 2–0 | 1–0 | 1–0 | 0–1 | 1–1 | 3–1 | 1–2 | 1–1 | | 1–1 |
| Coruxo | 1–0 | 3–0 | 0–0 | 1–0 | 3–1 | 0–0 | — | 3–1 | 4–1 | 2–1 | 1–1 | 2–0 | 2–0 | 2–2 | 2–0 | 2–2 | 0–0 | 1–2 |
| Cristo Atlético | 1–1 | 1–1 | 1–2 | 3–5 | 3–0 | 1–1 | 2–1 | — | 1–0 | 2–1 | 0–0 | 2–0 | 2–2 | 2–0 | 3–0 | 1–1 | 0–0 | 1–1 |
| Gimnástica Segoviana | 1–0 | 2–0 | 1–1 | 0–1 | 2–1 | 2–1 | 2–0 | 0–1 | — | 2–0 | 1–3 | 1–2 | 4–1 | 0–1 | 3–1 | 0–2 | 0–0 | 1–1 |
| Langreo | 1–1 | 1–1 | 2–1 | 3–0 | 1–0 | 2–1 | 1–1 | 1–2 | 1–1 | — | 1–3 | 3–0 | 2–1 | 1–0 | 0–0 | 1–2 | 1–1 | 1–1 |
| Leganés B | 2–3 | 3–0 | 0–1 | 1–2 | 4–0 | 1–1 | 1–0 | 0–1 | 1–0 | 1–1 | — | 1–0 | 3–0 | 0–0 | 0–4 | 2–0 | 0–1 | 1–1 |
| Llanera | 1–1 | 3–0 | 1–1 | 2–0 | 4–2 | 1–2 | 2–4 | 3–2 | 0–0 | 2–2 | 1–3 | — | 0–2 | 2–2 | 3–2 | 1–0 | 0–1 | 1–3 |
| Marino Luanco | 0–0 | 0–2 | 0–0 | 0–1 | 5–1 | 1–0 | 0–0 | 2–0 | 1–2 | 2–0 | 2–0 | 1–0 | — | 0–1 | 0–1 | 0–3 | 0–1 | 2–0 |
| Móstoles URJC | 0–0 | 1–2 | 1–4 | 1–1 | 3–0 | 2–1 | 2–0 | 2–1 | 0–3 | 0–1 | 3–3 | 2–0 | 2–1 | — | 0–1 | 2–2 | 2–0 | 0–0 |
| Navalcarnero | 0–0 | 4–1 | 0–0 | 0–1 | 4–2 | 2–1 | 1–0 | 2–0 | 4–2 | 1–0 | 0–2 | 2–0 | 1–2 | 2–1 | — | 0–2 | 2–0 | 1–1 |
| Pontevedra | 2–2 | 1–0 | 3–2 | 0–1 | 3–1 | 1–1 | 2–1 | 4–1 | 3–0 | 3–2 | 1–2 | 3–0 | 0–0 | 4–1 | 0–0 | — | 1–1 | 3–2 |
| Salamanca | 0–1 | 4–0 | 0–0 | 0–0 | 4–1 | 2–1 | 0–3 | 0–0 | 0–0 | 1–0 | 1–1 | 2–0 | 0–2 | 1–0 | 1–0 | 1–2 | — | 0–1 |
| Unión Adarve | 2–1 | 2–1 | 0–3 | 2–1 | 2–1 | 2–2 | 2–1 | 1–2 | 4–1 | 4–0 | 2–1 | 3–4 | 3–1 | 1–0 | 3–0 | 2–1 | 1–1 | — |

Updated to match(es) played on 15 May 2022. Source: SoccerWay
Legend: Blue = home team win; Yellow = draw; Red = away team win.

=== Top scorers ===
| Rank | Player | Club | Goal |
|---|---|---|---|
| 1 | (Brazil) Charles | Pontevedra | 19 |
| 2 | (Spain) Álvaro Sánchez | Móstoles URJC | 16 |
| 3 | (Spain) Fredi Sualdea | Cristo Atlético | 15 |
| 3 | (Brazil) Renan Zanelli | Arenteiro | 15 |

== Group 2 ==
Location of teams in 2021–22 Segunda División RFEF – Group 2
Location of Navarre teams in 2021–22 Segunda Federación – Group 2

=== Teams and locations ===
| Team | Home city | Stadium | Capacity |
|---|---|---|---|
| Ardoi | Zizur Mayor | El Pinar | 1,000 |
| Arenas | Getxo | Gobela | 2,000 |
| Burgos Promesas | Burgos | Castañares | 500 |
| Cayón | Sarón, Santa María de Cayón | Fernando Astobiza | 2,700 |
| Gernika | Gernika-Lumo | Urbieta | 3,000 |
| Izarra | Estella-Lizarra | Merkatondoa | 3,500 |
| Laredo | Laredo | San Lorenzo | 3,000 |
| UD Logroñés Promesas | Logroño | Mundial 82 | 1,275 |
| Mutilvera | Aranguren | Valle Aranguren | 2,000 |
| Náxara | Nájera | La Salera | 1,500 |
| Osasuna B | Pamplona | Tajonar | 4,500 |
| Peña Sport | Tafalla | San Francisco | 4,000 |
| Racing Rioja | Logroño | El Salvador | 1,160 |
| Rayo Cantabria | Santander | La Albericia | 600 |
| Real Sociedad C | San Sebastián | José Luis Orbegozo | 2,500 |
| San Juan | Pamplona | San Juan | 1,000 |
| Sestao River | Sestao | Las Llanas | 8,905 |
| Tropezón | Tanos, Torrelavega | Santa Ana | 1,500 |

=== Standings ===
| Pos | Team | Pld | W | D | L | GF | GA | GD | Pts | Qualification |
|---|---|---|---|---|---|---|---|---|---|---|
| 1 | Osasuna B (C, P) | 34 | 20 | 12 | 2 | 72 | 29 | +43 | 72 | Promotion to Primera División RFEF |
| 2 | Sestao River (Y) | 34 | 20 | 10 | 4 | 53 | 22 | +31 | 70 | Qualification for the promotion play–offs and Copa del Rey |
| 3 | Real Sociedad C | 34 | 15 | 14 | 5 | 55 | 30 | +25 | 59 | Qualification for the promotion play–offs |
| 4 | Rayo Cantabria | 34 | 15 | 11 | 8 | 42 | 29 | +13 | 56 (Note: Rayo Cantabria is ahead of Arenas on head-to-head points: Rayo Cantabria–Arenas 1–0, Arenas–Rayo Cantabria 0–2) | Qualification for the promotion play–offs |
| 5 | Arenas (Y) | 34 | 14 | 14 | 6 | 42 | 25 | +17 | 56 | Qualification for the promotion play–offs and Copa del Rey |
| 6 | San Juan (Y) | 34 | 14 | 9 | 11 | 47 | 39 | +8 | 51 | Qualification for the Copa del Rey |
| 7 | Racing Rioja (Y) | 34 | 13 | 11 | 10 | 43 | 39 | +4 | 50 | Qualification for the Copa del Rey |
| 8 | Gernika (Y) | 34 | 12 | 13 | 9 | 50 | 42 | +8 | 49 | Qualification for the Copa del Rey |
| 9 | Burgos Promesas | 34 | 12 | 12 | 10 | 42 | 33 | +9 | 48 | |
| 10 | Izarra | 34 | 11 | 12 | 11 | 33 | 34 | −1 | 45 (Note: Izarra is ahead of Mutilvera, UD Logroñés B and Laredo on head-to-head points: Izarra 10 pts, Mutilvera 10 pts, UD UD Logroñés B 7 pts, Laredo 1 pt) | |
| 11 | Mutilvera | 34 | 11 | 12 | 11 | 42 | 45 | −3 | 45 | |
| 12 | UD Logroñés B | 34 | 11 | 12 | 11 | 45 | 39 | +6 | 45 | |
| 13 | Laredo | 34 | 13 | 6 | 15 | 41 | 36 | +5 | 45 | |
| 14 | Cayón (R) | 34 | 7 | 12 | 15 | 26 | 60 | −34 | 33 | Relegation to Tercera División RFEF |
| 15 | Tropezón (R) | 34 | 6 | 9 | 19 | 40 | 68 | −28 | 27 | Relegation to Tercera División RFEF |
| 16 | Náxara (R) | 34 | 6 | 8 | 20 | 27 | 53 | −26 | 26 | Relegation to Tercera División RFEF |
| 17 | Ardoi (R) | 34 | 5 | 10 | 19 | 29 | 61 | −32 | 25 | Relegation to Tercera División RFEF |
| 18 | Peña Sport (R) | 34 | 3 | 9 | 22 | 31 | 76 | −45 | 18 | Relegation to Tercera División RFEF |

Updated to match(es) played on 15 May 2022. Source: SoccerWay
Rules for classification: 1) points; 2) head-to-head points; 3) head-to-head goal difference; 4) goal difference; 5) number of goals scored
(C) Champions; (P) Promoted; (R) Relegated; (Y) Assured qualification to the Copa del Rey

=== Results ===
| Home \ Away | ARD | ARE | BUR | CAY | GER | IZA | LAR | LOG | MUT | NAX | OSA | PSP | RIO | RAY | RSO | SJU | SES | TRO |
|---|---|---|---|---|---|---|---|---|---|---|---|---|---|---|---|---|---|---|
| Ardoi | — | 0–3 | 2–2 | 5–0 | 1–0 | 2–2 | 0–1 | 2–2 | 0–1 | 1–2 | 1–4 | 1–1 | 0–0 | 0–3 | 1–1 | 0–0 | 0–2 | 2–0 |
| Arenas | 2–1 | — | 1–0 | 2–0 | 0–0 | 1–1 | 0–0 | 0–0 | 1–3 | 0–0 | 1–0 | 6–0 | 2–1 | 0–2 | 0–1 | 0–0 | 1–1 | 2–1 |
| Burgos Promesas | 2–0 | 0–1 | — | 0–0 | 1–3 | 0–1 | 1–2 | 0–3 | 0–0 | 2–0 | 1–1 | 2–1 | 3–0 | 0–2 | 2–0 | 1–1 | 0–1 | 2–3 |
| Cayón | 1–1 | 1–1 | 0–1 | — | 2–2 | 0–0 | 1–0 | 2–1 | 1–2 | 1–0 | 1–4 | 2–1 | 0–0 | 1–1 | 0–6 | 0–2 | 1–1 | 4–3 |
| Gernika | 2–0 | 0–2 | 1–1 | 3–0 | — | 1–1 | 2–3 | 3–1 | 0–1 | 3–2 | 0–1 | 1–0 | 5–2 | 1–1 | 0–0 | 1–1 | 0–2 | 1–0 |
| Izarra | 2–0 | 1–3 | 0–3 | 1–1 | 1–1 | — | 1–0 | 2–1 | 2–0 | 2–0 | 0–1 | 3–1 | 2–0 | 0–1 | 1–1 | 1–1 | 0–1 | 2–2 |
| Laredo | 4–2 | 1–1 | 1–0 | 1–0 | 3–3 | 4–1 | — | 0–0 | 1–0 | 0–1 | 0–1 | 0–0 | 2–3 | 3–0 | 2–3 | 0–1 | 0–1 | 3–1 |
| UD Logroñés B | 3–2 | 1–1 | 0–0 | 0–1 | 3–0 | 1–0 | 1–0 | — | 2–3 | 3–0 | 0–3 | 1–1 | 0–0 | 1–2 | 3–3 | 3–1 | 1–1 | 4–1 |
| Mutilvera | 1–2 | 0–0 | 1–2 | 2–1 | 0–0 | 1–1 | 1–0 | 1–0 | — | 3–2 | 3–3 | 3–3 | 1–1 | 4–0 | 1–1 | 2–1 | 1–1 | 2–2 |
| Náxara | 0–1 | 0–1 | 0–0 | 1–1 | 0–1 | 0–0 | 0–2 | 1–3 | 4–1 | — | 1–2 | 2–0 | 0–3 | 0–4 | 1–1 | 0–3 | 2–1 | 1–1 |
| Osasuna B | 5–0 | 2–2 | 1–1 | 6–0 | 3–3 | 2–1 | 1–0 | 2–0 | 2–0 | 2–0 | — | 1–1 | 2–2 | 1–1 | 1–1 | 3–4 | 1–1 | 2–0 |
| Peña Sport | 3–1 | 0–2 | 1–3 | 1–1 | 0–2 | 0–1 | 1–6 | 1–2 | 2–1 | 2–3 | 3–3 | — | 1–3 | 0–2 | 2–3 | 0–4 | 0–0 | 2–1 |
| Racing Rioja | 2–0 | 0–0 | 2–5 | 4–0 | 4–3 | 1–0 | 0–0 | 1–1 | 1–0 | 1–0 | 0–2 | 1–0 | — | 1–0 | 0–0 | 1–0 | 1–1 | 4–0 |
| Rayo Cantabria | 3–0 | 1–0 | 0–2 | 2–1 | 0–0 | 3–1 | 4–1 | 1–0 | 0–0 | 0–0 | 0–3 | 0–0 | 2–2 | — | 0–2 | 2–2 | 1–2 | 2–0 |
| Real Soc. C | 0–0 | 0–0 | 2–2 | 2–0 | 2–3 | 0–1 | 0–1 | 1–1 | 3–1 | 3–2 | 0–0 | 6–1 | 2–1 | 1–0 | — | 2–1 | 1–0 | 5–0 |
| San Juan | 2–0 | 2–1 | 0–1 | 0–1 | 1–1 | 0–1 | 2–0 | 1–2 | 2–1 | 2–1 | 0–2 | 2–1 | 1–0 | 0–0 | 1–1 | — | 0–2 | 4–3 |
| Sestao River | 4–0 | 4–2 | 1–1 | 3–0 | 3–2 | 0–0 | 2–0 | 2–1 | 3–0 | 2–0 | 1–2 | 1–0 | 2–0 | 0–0 | 1–0 | 2–1 | — | 4–2 |
| Tropezón | 1–1 | 1–3 | 1–1 | 1–1 | 0–2 | 1–0 | 1–0 | 0–0 | 1–1 | 1–1 | 0–3 | 6–1 | 2–1 | 0–2 | 0–1 | 3–4 | 1–0 | — |

Updated to match(es) played on 15 May 2022. Source: SoccerWay
Legend: Blue = home team win; Yellow = draw; Red = away team win.

=== Top scorers ===
| Rank | Player | Club | Goal |
|---|---|---|---|
| 1 | (Spain) Nacho Heras | Burgos Promesas | 18 |
| 2 | (Spain) Urko Izeta | Arenas | 16 |
| 3 | (Spain) Ander Pacheco | Gernika | 15 |

== Group 3 ==
Location of teams in 2021–22 Segunda División RFEF – Group 3
Location of teams in 2021–22 Segunda División RFEF – Group 3 (Province of Barcelona)

=== Teams and locations ===
| Team | Home city | Stadium | Capacity |
|---|---|---|---|
| Andratx | Andratx | Sa Plana | 600 |
| Badalona | Badalona | Municipal de Badalona | 4,170 |
| Brea | Brea de Aragón | Piedrabuena | 2,000 |
| Cerdanyola del Vallès | Cerdanyola del Vallès | Fontetes | 1,000 |
| Ebro | Zaragoza | El Carmen | 3,000 |
| Ejea | Ejea de los Caballeros | Luchán | 1,200 |
| Espanyol B | Barcelona | Dani Jarque | 1,520 |
| Europa | Barcelona | Nou Sardenya | 7,000 |
| Formentera | Sant Francesc Xavier, Formentera | Municipal | 500 |
| Huesca B | Huesca | San Jorge | 1,000 |
| Ibiza Islas Pitiusas | Ibiza | Can Misses | 4,500 |
| Lleida Esportiu | Lleida | Camp d'Esports | 13,500 |
| Numancia | Soria | Los Pajaritos | 8,261 |
| Peña Deportiva | Santa Eulària des Riu | Municipal de Santa Eulària | 1,500 |
| Prat | El Prat de Llobregat | Sagnier | 1,500 |
| Tarazona | Tarazona | Municipal de Tarazona | 5,000 |
| Terrassa | Terrassa | Olímpic | 11,500 |
| Teruel | Teruel | Pinilla | 4,500 |

=== Standings ===
| Pos | Team | Pld | W | D | L | GF | GA | GD | Pts | Qualification |
|---|---|---|---|---|---|---|---|---|---|---|
| 1 | Numancia (C, P, Q) | 34 | 17 | 11 | 6 | 45 | 26 | +19 | 62 | Promotion to Primera División RFEF and qualification for Copa del Rey |
| 2 | Espanyol B | 34 | 17 | 6 | 11 | 54 | 46 | +8 | 57 | Qualification for the promotion play–offs |
| 3 | Peña Deportiva (Y) | 34 | 15 | 11 | 8 | 45 | 33 | +12 | 56 | Qualification for the promotion play–offs and Copa del Rey |
| 4 | Teruel (Y) | 34 | 13 | 13 | 8 | 36 | 37 | −1 | 52 (Note: Teruel is ahead of Lleida Esportiu on head-to-head points: Teruel–Lleida Esportiu 1–0, Lleida Esportiu–Teruel 0–0) | Qualification for the promotion play–offs and Copa del Rey |
| 5 | Lleida Esportiu (Y) | 34 | 15 | 7 | 12 | 38 | 39 | −1 | 52 | Qualification for the promotion play–offs and Copa del Rey |
| 6 | Ibiza Islas Pitiusas (Y) | 34 | 13 | 11 | 10 | 47 | 37 | +10 | 50 (Note: Ibiza Islas Pitiusas is ahead of Formentera on overall goal difference) | Qualification for the Copa del Rey |
| 7 | Formentera | 34 | 14 | 8 | 12 | 38 | 32 | +6 | 50 | |
| 8 | Terrassa | 34 | 13 | 8 | 13 | 49 | 42 | +7 | 47 (Note: Terrassa is ahead of Ebro on head-to-head points: Terrassa–Ebro 1–0, Ebro–Terrassa 1–1) | |
| 9 | Ebro | 34 | 11 | 14 | 9 | 35 | 29 | +6 | 47 | |
| 10 | Brea | 34 | 11 | 12 | 11 | 32 | 34 | −2 | 45 | |
| 11 | Tarazona | 34 | 11 | 9 | 14 | 36 | 37 | −1 | 42 (Note: Tarazona is ahead of Prat and Cerdanyola del Vallès on head-to-head points: Tarazona 7 pts, Prat 6 pts, Cerdanyola del Vallès 4 pts) | |
| 12 | Prat | 34 | 11 | 9 | 14 | 33 | 36 | −3 | 42 | |
| 13 | Cerdanyola del Vallès (Note: Cerdanyola del Vallès had originally lost in the relegation playoffs but still remained in the 2022–23 Segunda Federación due to Talavera de la Reina taking over Internacional’s spot in 2022–23 Primera Federación.) | 34 | 11 | 9 | 14 | 45 | 48 | −3 | 42 | |
| 14 | Andratx (R) | 34 | 10 | 11 | 13 | 37 | 36 | +1 | 41 (Note: Andratx is ahead of Badalona on head-to-head points: Andratx–Badalona 1–0, Badalona–Andratx 1–1) | Relegation to Tercera División RFEF |
| 15 | Badalona (R) | 34 | 8 | 17 | 9 | 29 | 34 | −5 | 41 | Relegation to Tercera División RFEF |
| 16 | Europa (R) | 34 | 10 | 8 | 16 | 33 | 50 | −17 | 38 | Relegation to Tercera División RFEF |
| 17 | Huesca B (R) | 34 | 8 | 13 | 13 | 37 | 44 | −7 | 37 | Relegation to Tercera División RFEF |
| 18 | Ejea (R) | 34 | 4 | 11 | 19 | 28 | 57 | −29 | 23 | Relegation to Tercera División RFEF |

Updated to match(es) played on 15 May 2022. Source: SoccerWay
Rules for classification: 1) points; 2) head-to-head points; 3) head-to-head goal difference; 4) goal difference; 5) number of goals scored
(C) Champions; (P) Promoted; (Q) Qualified for the phase indicated; (R) Relegated; (Y) Qualification to the Copa del Rey

=== Results ===
| Home \ Away | AND | BAD | BRE | CDV | EBR | EJE | ESP | EUR | FOR | HUE | IBP | LLE | NUM | PDE | PRA | TAR | TRS | TRL |
|---|---|---|---|---|---|---|---|---|---|---|---|---|---|---|---|---|---|---|
| Andratx | — | 1–0 | 0–1 | 1–1 | 1–2 | 4–0 | 1–2 | 4–1 | 3–0 | 2–0 | 2–2 | 3–0 | 1–2 | 4–3 | 1–0 | 1–1 | 0–0 | 0–1 |
| Badalona | 1–1 | — | 0–0 | 1–1 | 1–1 | 0–0 | 3–3 | 0–0 | 0–0 | 1–1 | 1–0 | 2–2 | 1–0 | 0–1 | 1–0 | 1–1 | 1–0 | 2–1 |
| Brea | 0–1 | 2–1 | — | 3–3 | 1–1 | 3–2 | 1–2 | 0–0 | 1–3 | 1–0 | 0–1 | 1–0 | 1–0 | 1–1 | 1–2 | 2–0 | 1–1 | 0–1 |
| Cerdanyola del Vallès | 1–1 | 0–0 | 2–1 | — | 0–2 | 4–0 | 3–2 | 4–1 | 2–3 | 2–0 | 3–1 | 2–1 | 2–2 | 0–3 | 2–1 | 0–0 | 2–0 | 3–0 |
| Ebro | 1–1 | 2–0 | 0–0 | 4–1 | — | 1–0 | 0–1 | 3–0 | 0–0 | 0–0 | 2–0 | 1–2 | 1–1 | 1–1 | 1–1 | 0–0 | 1–1 | 2–0 |
| Ejea | 1–1 | 0–2 | 1–1 | 4–2 | 0–0 | — | 1–4 | 1–2 | 1–2 | 1–1 | 2–2 | 0–1 | 0–0 | 0–1 | 1–0 | 1–1 | 0–2 | 1–1 |
| Espanyol B | 1–1 | 1–0 | 1–2 | 2–1 | 3–0 | 2–2 | — | 1–0 | 2–0 | 1–0 | 0–3 | 2–1 | 1–0 | 0–3 | 2–2 | 1–1 | 2–1 | 3–1 |
| Europa | 1–0 | 2–1 | 1–0 | 0–0 | 1–2 | 2–3 | 1–3 | — | 0–1 | 0–3 | 3–0 | 0–1 | 1–2 | 1–0 | 0–0 | 1–2 | 1–1 | 0–2 |
| Formentera | 2–0 | 1–0 | 0–1 | 2–1 | 1–0 | 1–1 | 0–1 | 0–0 | — | 3–1 | 2–1 | 2–1 | 0–0 | 3–0 | 0–1 | 1–1 | 3–0 | 0–1 |
| Huesca B | 0–0 | 3–3 | 1–1 | 2–0 | 1–2 | 2–3 | 4–3 | 1–0 | 0–0 | — | 0–0 | 1–3 | 2–2 | 1–1 | 2–1 | 0–2 | 1–0 | 0–0 |
| Ibiza Islas Pitiusas | 2–0 | 1–2 | 0–0 | 1–0 | 1–1 | 2–0 | 2–1 | 5–1 | 2–1 | 0–0 | — | 4–0 | 1–2 | 1–3 | 0–1 | 2–0 | 3–0 | 2–2 |
| Lleida Esportiu | 1–1 | 2–2 | 1–0 | 0–1 | 1–2 | 2–1 | 2–1 | 0–2 | 2–1 | 1–0 | 1–1 | — | 2–0 | 1–1 | 1–1 | 1–0 | 0–1 | 0–0 |
| Numancia | 3–0 | 0–0 | 1–0 | 2–0 | 2–0 | 3–0 | 1–0 | 1–2 | 2–1 | 3–1 | 1–1 | 1–2 | — | 2–1 | 2–1 | 2–1 | 2–0 | 0–0 |
| Peña Deportiva | 1–0 | 3–0 | 3–0 | 1–1 | 1–1 | 1–0 | 1–0 | 2–2 | 0–3 | 0–2 | 0–0 | 2–1 | 1–1 | — | 1–0 | 3–1 | 1–0 | 2–2 |
| Prat | 1–0 | 0–1 | 1–1 | 1–0 | 2–1 | 2–1 | 2–0 | 0–1 | 1–1 | 1–1 | 1–2 | 1–2 | 1–1 | 1–0 | — | 1–0 | 2–1 | 0–0 |
| Tarazona | 2–0 | 1–1 | 1–2 | 2–0 | 2–0 | 2–0 | 1–2 | 1–3 | 1–0 | 3–2 | 0–2 | 0–1 | 0–1 | 1–0 | 2–1 | — | 3–0 | 1–2 |
| Terrassa | 0–1 | 3–0 | 2–2 | 3–1 | 1–0 | 1–0 | 2–2 | 4–1 | 4–1 | 2–1 | 3–0 | 1–2 | 1–1 | 1–2 | 4–3 | 2–1 | — | 6–0 |
| Teruel | 2–0 | 0–0 | 0–1 | 1–0 | 1–0 | 2–0 | 3–2 | 2–2 | 1–0 | 2–3 | 2–2 | 1–0 | 0–2 | 1–1 | 2–0 | 1–1 | 1–1 | — |

Updated to match(es) played on 15 May 2022. Source: SoccerWay
Legend: Blue = home team win; Yellow = draw; Red = away team win.

=== Top scorers ===
| Rank | Player | Club | Goal |
|---|---|---|---|
| 1 | (Spain) Cristian Dieste | Tarazona | 18 |
| 2 | (Spain) Juan Delgado | Ibiza Islas Pitiusas | 17 |
| 3 | (Spain) Kevin Carlos | Huesca B | 16 |

== Group 4 ==
Location of teams in 2021–22 Segunda División RFEF – Group 4
Location of teams of the 2021–22 Segunda División RFEF – Group 4 (Canary Islands)

=== Teams and locations ===
| Team | Home city | Stadium | Capacity |
|---|---|---|---|
| Antequera | Antequera | El Maulí | 6,000 |
| Cacereño | Cáceres | Príncipe Felipe | 7,000 |
| Cádiz B | Cádiz | Ramón Blanco Rodríguez | 2,500 |
| Ceuta | Ceuta | Alfonso Murube | 6,500 |
| Córdoba | Córdoba | El Arcángel | 20,989 |
| Coria | Coria | La Isla | 3,000 |
| Don Benito | Don Benito | Vicente Sanz | 3,500 |
| Las Palmas Atlético | Las Palmas de Gran Canaria | Anexo al Estadio Gran Canaria | 2,000 |
| Mensajero | Santa Cruz de La Palma | Silvestre Carrillo | 6,000 |
| Mérida | Mérida | Estadio Romano | 14,600 |
| Montijo | Montijo | Municipal | 2,000 |
| Panadería Pulido | Vega de San Mateo | San Mateo | 3,000 |
| San Fernando | San Bartolomé de Tirajana | Ciudad Deportiva | 1,000 |
| San Roque Lepe | Lepe | Ciudad de Lepe | 3,512 |
| Tamaraceite | Las Palmas de Gran Canaria | Juan Guedes | 1,100 |
| Vélez | Vélez-Málaga | Vivar Téllez | 2,100 |
| Villanovense | Villanueva de la Serena | Romero Cuerda | 5,000 |
| Xerez Deportivo | Jerez de la Frontera | Chapín | 20,523 |

=== Standings ===
| Pos | Team | Pld | W | D | L | GF | GA | GD | Pts | Qualification |
|---|---|---|---|---|---|---|---|---|---|---|
| 1 | Córdoba (Note: San Fernando awarded a 3–0 win in their Round 23 match against Córdoba after the latter fielded an ineligible player. The match originally ended 0–3.) (C, P, Q) | 34 | 25 | 7 | 2 | 86 | 29 | +57 | 82 | Promotion to Primera División RFEF and qualification for Copa del Rey |
| 2 | Mérida (P, Y) | 34 | 18 | 8 | 8 | 49 | 26 | +23 | 62 | Qualification for the promotion play-offs and Copa del Rey |
| 3 | Cacereño (Y) | 34 | 17 | 10 | 7 | 48 | 37 | +11 | 61 | Qualification for the promotion play-offs and Copa del Rey |
| 4 | Ceuta (P, Y) | 34 | 14 | 12 | 8 | 46 | 32 | +14 | 54 | Qualification for the promotion play-offs and Copa del Rey |
| 5 | Coria (Y) | 34 | 15 | 8 | 11 | 42 | 40 | +2 | 53 | Qualification for the promotion play-offs and Copa del Rey |
| 6 | San Roque Lepe | 34 | 14 | 10 | 10 | 39 | 28 | +11 | 52 | |
| 7 | Cádiz B | 34 | 13 | 11 | 10 | 36 | 35 | +1 | 50 (Note: Cádiz B is ahead of Villanovense on head-to-head points: Cádiz B–Villanovense 1–0, Villanovense–Cádiz B 1–1) | |
| 8 | Villanovense | 34 | 14 | 8 | 12 | 39 | 28 | +11 | 50 | |
| 9 | Montijo | 34 | 13 | 8 | 13 | 37 | 38 | −1 | 47 (Note: Montijo is ahead of Xerez Deportivo on head-to-head points: Montijo–Xerez Deportivo 2–0, Xerez Deportivo–Montijo 1–0) | |
| 10 | Xerez Deportivo | 34 | 13 | 8 | 13 | 28 | 40 | −12 | 47 | |
| 11 | Vélez (Note: Vélez awarded a 0–3 win in their Round 15 match at Antequera after the latter fielded an ineligible player. The match originally ended 3–1.) | 34 | 13 | 7 | 14 | 39 | 42 | −3 | 46 | |
| 12 | Antequera | 34 | 11 | 11 | 12 | 36 | 37 | −1 | 44 | |
| 13 | Don Benito | 34 | 10 | 11 | 13 | 43 | 42 | +1 | 41 | Won the relegation play-offs |
| 14 | Mensajero (R) | 34 | 7 | 14 | 13 | 35 | 47 | −12 | 35 | Relegation to Tercera División RFEF |
| 15 | Las Palmas Atlético (R) | 34 | 7 | 10 | 17 | 41 | 61 | −20 | 31 | Relegation to Tercera División RFEF |
| 16 | San Fernando (R) | 34 | 7 | 8 | 19 | 30 | 55 | −25 | 29 | Relegation to Tercera División RFEF |
| 17 | Panadería Pulido (R) | 34 | 5 | 10 | 19 | 32 | 61 | −29 | 25 (Note: Panadería Pulido is ahead of Tamaraceite on head-to-head points: Panadería Pulido–Tamaraceite 1–1, Tamaraceite–Panadería Pulido 0–3) | Relegation to Tercera División RFEF |
| 18 | Tamaraceite (R) | 34 | 6 | 7 | 21 | 36 | 64 | −28 | 25 | Relegation to Tercera División RFEF |

Updated to match(es) played on 15 May 2022. Source: SoccerWay
Rules for classification: 1) points; 2) head-to-head points; 3) head-to-head goal difference; 4) goal difference; 5) number of goals scored
(C) Champions; (P) Promoted; (Q) Qualified for the phase indicated; (R) Relegated; (Y) Assured of qualification to the Copa del Rey

=== Results ===
| Home \ Away | ANT | CAC | CAD | CEU | CRD | COA | DBE | LPA | MEN | MER | MON | PAN | SFE | SRL | TAM | VEL | VIL | XDE |
|---|---|---|---|---|---|---|---|---|---|---|---|---|---|---|---|---|---|---|
| Antequera | — | 2–2 | 1–1 | 3–1 | 0–1 | 0–0 | 2–1 | 3–1 | 0–0 | 0–2 | 2–1 | 1–2 | 1–0 | 0–0 | 3–1 | 0–3 (Note: Vélez awarded an 0–3 win in their match against Antequera after the latter fielded an ineligible player. The match originally ended 3–1.) | 0–1 | 2–0 |
| Cacereño | 3–1 | — | 1–1 | 2–0 | 2–2 | 1–1 | 2–0 | 3–2 | 1–1 | 1–2 | 2–0 | 4–2 | 3–2 | 1–1 | 1–0 | 2–0 | 0–1 | 2–0 |
| Cádiz B | 1–0 | 0–1 | — | 1–0 | 0–4 | 0–1 | 2–1 | 1–0 | 0–0 | 0–2 | 2–2 | 2–1 | 5–0 | 1–0 | 3–2 | 0–2 | 1–0 | 0–0 |
| Ceuta | 1–0 | 3–0 | 2–0 | — | 0–0 | 3–1 | 0–0 | 0–0 | 2–0 | 0–1 | 0–0 | 3–1 | 1–0 | 1–1 | 2–2 | 1–0 | 2–3 | 1–1 |
| Córdoba | 2–0 | 5–0 | 3–1 | 3–2 | — | 3–1 | 3–2 | 5–1 | 3–1 | 3–0 | 3–1 | 4–0 | 4–1 | 2–1 | 4–0 | 4–1 | 2–0 | 4–0 |
| Coria | 2–0 | 1–3 | 3–2 | 2–2 | 0–3 | — | 1–0 | 3–1 | 3–2 | 1–1 | 2–0 | 1–2 | 2–2 | 2–0 | 4–1 | 0–1 | 0–0 | 2–1 |
| Don Benito | 1–1 | 1–1 | 2–3 | 0–2 | 1–2 | 3–0 | — | 3–2 | 1–1 | 2–2 | 1–0 | 1–1 | 2–2 | 0–0 | 2–0 | 4–1 | 1–0 | 1–2 |
| Las Palmas Atl. | 1–2 | 1–2 | 1–1 | 0–2 | 2–2 | 3–1 | 1–4 | — | 2–1 | 1–3 | 0–3 | 2–2 | 1–0 | 2–3 | 3–3 | 2–0 | 1–1 | 1–0 |
| Mensajero | 3–3 | 0–0 | 1–2 | 1–3 | 1–1 | 0–1 | 1–2 | 1–2 | — | 1–0 | 1–0 | 3–1 | 2–0 | 0–0 | 2–2 | 2–0 | 1–0 | 0–0 |
| Mérida | 1–1 | 0–1 | 2–1 | 1–1 | 0–1 | 0–1 | 3–0 | 2–0 | 1–1 | — | 2–1 | 2–1 | 4–1 | 0–1 | 6–1 | 2–0 | 1–0 | 0–0 |
| Montijo | 1–0 | 1–1 | 1–1 | 1–0 | 1–1 | 1–0 | 3–1 | 0–1 | 2–2 | 2–0 | — | 0–0 | 2–0 | 0–1 | 1–7 | 1–0 | 2–1 | 2–0 |
| Panadería Pulido | 1–2 | 0–2 | 1–0 | 1–2 | 3–3 | 0–1 | 1–1 | 1–1 | 2–2 | 1–3 | 0–0 | — | 1–1 | 0–1 | 1–1 | 2–0 | 1–3 | 0–1 |
| San Fernando | 0–0 | 1–1 | 0–0 | 1–0 | 3–0 (Note: San Fernando awarded an 0–3 win in their match against Córdoba after the latter fielded an ineligible player. The match originally ended 0–3.) | 0–1 | 1–3 | 3–2 | 0–1 | 0–1 | 1–2 | 1–0 | — | 0–0 | 3–2 | 0–0 | 2–1 | 0–1 |
| San Roque Lepe | 0–2 | 2–0 | 0–0 | 2–2 | 0–1 | 1–2 | 1–0 | 1–1 | 4–1 | 0–1 | 1–2 | 2–0 | 3–1 | — | 1–0 | 5–1 | 2–0 | 4–2 |
| Tamaraceite | 0–1 | 0–1 | 0–2 | 0–2 | 1–1 | 1–0 | 0–0 | 0–0 | 3–0 | 0–3 | 2–1 | 0–3 | 3–4 | 2–0 | — | 1–2 | 0–1 | 1–0 |
| Vélez | 1–1 | 1–2 | 0–0 | 2–2 | 1–2 | 2–1 | 0–0 | 1–0 | 3–0 | 0–0 | 0–3 | 4–0 | 3–0 | 1–0 | 2–0 | — | 2–1 | 5–2 |
| Villanovense | 1–1 | 2–0 | 1–1 | 0–1 | 1–0 | 0–0 | 0–2 | 2–2 | 1–1 | 1–0 | 2–0 | 6–0 | 2–0 | 0–0 | 3–0 | 2–0 | — | 2–0 |
| Xerez Deportivo | 1–0 | 1–0 | 0–1 | 2–2 | 1–5 | 1–1 | 1–0 | 2–1 | 2–1 | 1–1 | 1–0 | 1–0 | 1–0 | 0–1 | 1–0 | 0–0 | 2–0 | — |

Updated to match(es) played on 15 May 2022. Source: SoccerWay
Legend: Blue = home team win; Yellow = draw; Red = away team win.

=== Top scorers ===
| Rank | Player | Club | Goal |
|---|---|---|---|
| 1 | (Spain) Antonio Casas | Córdoba | 17 |
| 2 | (Spain) Willy Ledesma | Córdoba | 16 |
| 2 | (Spain) Chuma | San Roque Lepe | 16 |

== Group 5 ==
Location of teams in 2021–22 Segunda División RFEF – Group 5

=== Teams and locations ===
| Team | Home city | Stadium | Capacity |
|---|---|---|---|
| Águilas | Águilas | El Rubial | 4,000 |
| Alzira | Alzira | Luis Suñer Picó | 5,000 |
| Atlético Levante | Valencia | Ciudad Deportiva de Buñol | 3,000 |
| Atlético Mancha Real | Mancha Real | La Juventud | 1,500 |
| Atlético Pulpileño | Pulpí | San Miguel | 2,000 |
| Calvo Sotelo | Puertollano | Ciudad de Puertollano | 7,240 |
| Eldense | Elda | Nuevo Pepico Amat | 4,036 |
| El Ejido | El Ejido | Santo Domingo | 7,870 |
| Hércules | Alicante | José Rico Pérez | 30,000 |
| Intercity | Sant Joan d'Alacant | San Juan | 2,000 |
| La Nucía | La Nucía | Camilo Cano | 3,000 |
| Mar Menor | San Javier | Pitín | 3,000 |
| Marchamalo | Marchamalo | La Solana | 1,000 |
| Melilla | Melilla | Álvarez Claro | 10,000 |
| Murcia | Murcia | Enrique Roca | 31,179 |
| Recreativo Granada | Granada | Ciudad Deportiva | 2,500 |
| Socuéllamos | Socuéllamos | Paquito Jiménez | 2,500 |
| Toledo | Toledo | Salto del Caballo | 5,500 |

=== Standings ===
| Pos | Team | Pld | W | D | L | GF | GA | GD | Pts | Qualification |
|---|---|---|---|---|---|---|---|---|---|---|
| 1 | Intercity (C, P, Q) | 34 | 18 | 12 | 4 | 46 | 16 | +30 | 66 | Promotion to Primera División RFEF and qualification for Copa del Rey |
| 2 | La Nucía (P, Y) | 34 | 18 | 10 | 6 | 41 | 18 | +23 | 64 | Qualification for the promotion play–offs and Copa del Rey |
| 3 | Murcia (P, Y) | 34 | 15 | 13 | 6 | 42 | 27 | +15 | 58 | Qualification for the promotion play–offs and Copa del Rey |
| 4 | Eldense (P, Y) | 34 | 15 | 11 | 8 | 47 | 37 | +10 | 56 (Note: Eldense is ahead of Hércules on head-to-head points: Eldense–Hércules 2–2, Hércules–Eldense 0–1) | Qualification for the promotion play–offs and Copa del Rey |
| 5 | Hércules (Y) | 34 | 15 | 11 | 8 | 41 | 31 | +10 | 56 | Qualification for the promotion play–offs and Copa del Rey |
| 6 | Mar Menor | 34 | 16 | 7 | 11 | 34 | 29 | +5 | 55 | |
| 7 | Alzira | 34 | 13 | 12 | 9 | 42 | 36 | +6 | 51 | |
| 8 | Recreativo Granada | 34 | 11 | 13 | 10 | 34 | 32 | +2 | 46 | |
| 9 | Melilla | 34 | 12 | 9 | 13 | 36 | 39 | −3 | 45 | |
| 10 | Atlético Mancha Real | 34 | 12 | 7 | 15 | 32 | 36 | −4 | 43 (Note: Atlético Mancha Real is ahead of El Ejido and Socuéllamos on goal difference) | |
| 11 | El Ejido | 34 | 12 | 7 | 15 | 30 | 35 | −5 | 43 | |
| 12 | Socuéllamos | 34 | 10 | 13 | 11 | 29 | 34 | −5 | 43 | |
| 13 | Águilas (R) | 34 | 10 | 11 | 13 | 32 | 36 | −4 | 41 | Relegated in the relegation play-offs |
| 14 | Atlético Levante (R) | 34 | 9 | 11 | 14 | 33 | 33 | 0 | 38 | Relegation to Tercera División RFEF |
| 15 | Atlético Pulpileño (R) | 34 | 8 | 10 | 16 | 23 | 48 | −25 | 34 | Relegation to Tercera División RFEF |
| 16 | Marchamalo (R) | 34 | 8 | 8 | 18 | 33 | 59 | −26 | 32 | Relegation to Tercera División RFEF |
| 17 | Calvo Sotelo Puertollano (R) | 34 | 8 | 5 | 21 | 38 | 50 | −12 | 29 | Relegation to Tercera División RFEF |
| 18 | Toledo (R) | 34 | 6 | 10 | 18 | 27 | 44 | −17 | 28 | Relegation to Tercera División RFEF |

Updated to match(es) played on 15 May 2022. Source: SoccerWay
Rules for classification: 1) points; 2) head-to-head points; 3) head-to-head goal difference; 4) goal difference; 5) number of goals scored
(C) Champions; (P) Promoted; (Q) Qualified for the phase indicated; (R) Relegated; (Y) Assured of qualification to the Copa del Rey

=== Results ===
| Home \ Away | AGU | ALZ | LEV | AMR | APU | CSP | ELD | EJI | HER | INT | LNU | MMN | MAC | MEL | MUR | RCG | SOC | TOL |
|---|---|---|---|---|---|---|---|---|---|---|---|---|---|---|---|---|---|---|
| Águilas | — | 2–2 | 2–1 | 1–1 | 0–0 | 1–0 | 0–1 | 0–1 | 1–1 | 1–2 | 2–0 | 2–0 | 2–0 | 0–1 | 1–2 | 0–0 | 2–2 | 1–3 |
| Alzira | 1–1 | — | 1–0 | 0–0 | 1–0 | 2–1 | 0–2 | 2–0 | 4–0 | 0–0 | 2–2 | 1–0 | 1–0 | 0–1 | 2–2 | 2–2 | 3–0 | 1–1 |
| Atlético Levante | 2–0 | 1–2 | — | 1–1 | 0–1 | 0–0 | 1–1 | 0–0 | 2–0 | 0–5 | 0–1 | 1–1 | 1–0 | 0–1 | 1–1 | 1–1 | 2–0 | 0–2 |
| At. Mancha Real | 5–0 | 1–2 | 0–1 | — | 1–1 | 2–0 | 0–1 | 1–0 | 1–2 | 0–1 | 0–3 | 1–2 | 0–2 | 2–2 | 2–1 | 0–2 | 1–0 | 2–0 |
| Atlético Pulpileño | 2–2 | 1–1 | 1–0 | 2–0 | — | 1–0 | 1–3 | 0–1 | 0–4 | 1–1 | 1–4 | 0–2 | 1–1 | 1–3 | 0–0 | 0–3 | 1–2 | 0–0 |
| Calvo Sotelo | 1–2 | 1–3 | 0–0 | 1–2 | 2–0 | — | 0–1 | 1–1 | 2–1 | 0–1 | 1–2 | 4–0 | 1–2 | 1–0 | 1–2 | 3–0 | 1–1 | 2–1 |
| Eldense | 0–1 | 1–1 | 1–3 | 0–1 | 0–3 | 3–2 | — | 3–1 | 2–2 | 0–0 | 1–1 | 1–0 | 4–0 | 2–1 | 1–3 | 3–1 | 0–2 | 3–1 |
| El Ejido | 1–0 | 1–1 | 1–2 | 0–1 | 0–1 | 2–0 | 1–1 | — | 0–1 | 0–1 | 0–2 | 0–1 | 2–2 | 3–1 | 1–0 | 3–1 | 0–0 | 1–2 |
| Hércules | 2–1 | 2–0 | 0–3 | 3–1 | 3–0 | 2–1 | 0–1 | 2–0 | — | 0–1 | 0–0 | 2–1 | 1–1 | 1–1 | 3–0 | 1–1 | 0–0 | 1–0 |
| Intercity | 1–0 | 3–0 | 2–0 | 1–0 | 4–0 | 4–0 | 1–1 | 0–1 | 1–2 | — | 1–1 | 3–0 | 3–0 | 0–0 | 0–0 | 1–0 | 1–0 | 0–0 |
| La Nucía | 0–0 | 2–0 | 1–0 | 1–1 | 2–0 | 3–2 | 1–0 | 0–1 | 1–0 | 0–0 | — | 1–0 | 2–0 | 2–0 | 1–2 | 0–0 | 0–0 | 2–0 |
| Mar Menor | 0–0 | 1–0 | 1–1 | 1–0 | 4–0 | 1–0 | 1–1 | 1–0 | 0–0 | 0–1 | 0–0 | — | 3–0 | 2–0 | 1–0 | 0–1 | 1–0 | 2–0 |
| Marchamalo | 1–0 | 4–3 | 1–7 | 0–0 | 1–0 | 0–0 | 1–2 | 4–2 | 0–1 | 2–2 | 0–3 | 2–0 | — | 0–0 | 1–1 | 0–1 | 1–2 | 0–2 |
| Melilla | 1–1 | 1–1 | 1–0 | 0–2 | 0–1 | 2–1 | 3–2 | 2–0 | 1–2 | 0–0 | 1–0 | 2–3 | 4–1 | — | 2–2 | 1–3 | 3–1 | 1–0 |
| Murcia | 1–0 | 1–0 | 1–0 | 1–0 | 1–1 | 3–1 | 1–2 | 1–1 | 1–1 | 2–0 | 1–2 | 2–0 | 3–2 | 0–0 | — | 2–0 | 0–0 | 2–0 |
| Recreativo Granada | 0–2 | 0–1 | 1–0 | 3–0 | 1–1 | 2–1 | 1–1 | 0–1 | 0–0 | 3–3 | 1–0 | 0–1 | 1–2 | 1–0 | 0–0 | — | 2–0 | 1–1 |
| Socuéllamos | 1–3 | 1–0 | 0–0 | 0–1 | 1–0 | 2–3 | 1–1 | 1–3 | 2–0 | 2–1 | 1–0 | 2–2 | 1–0 | 2–0 | 0–0 | 1–1 | — | 1–1 |
| Toledo | 0–1 | 1–2 | 2–2 | 1–2 | 0–1 | 1–4 | 1–1 | 0–1 | 1–1 | 0–1 | 0–1 | 1–2 | 3–2 | 2–0 | 0–3 | 0–0 | 0–0 | — |

Updated to match(es) played on 15 May 2022. Source: SoccerWay
Legend: Blue = home team win; Yellow = draw; Red = away team win.

=== Top scorers ===
| Rank | Player | Club | Goal |
|---|---|---|---|
| 1 | (Spain) Pablo García | Eldense | 13 |
| 2 | (Spain) Jorge García | El Ejido | 11 |
| 3 | (Spain) Eduardo Ubis | Mar Menor | 10 |
| 3 | (Switzerland) Rubén del Campo | Melilla | 10 |
| 3 | (Spain) Iván Limón | Calvo Sotelo | 10 |

== Ranking of 13th-place teams ==
| Pos | Team | Pld | W | D | L | GF | GA | GD | Pts | Qualification or relegation |
|---|---|---|---|---|---|---|---|---|---|---|
| 1 | Laredo | 34 | 13 | 6 | 15 | 41 | 36 | +5 | 45 | |
| 2 | Cerdanyola del Vallès (R) | 34 | 11 | 9 | 14 | 45 | 48 | −3 | 42 | Qualification for the relegation play-offs |
| 3 | Gimnástica Segoviana (O) | 34 | 11 | 9 | 14 | 37 | 42 | −5 | 42 | Qualification for the relegation play-offs |
| 4 | Don Benito (O) | 34 | 10 | 11 | 13 | 43 | 42 | +1 | 41 | Qualification for the relegation play-offs |
| 5 | Águilas (R) | 34 | 10 | 11 | 13 | 32 | 36 | −4 | 41 | Qualification for the relegation play-offs |

Rules for classification: 1) points; 2) goal difference; 3) number of goals scored
(O) Play-off winners; (R) Relegated

== Copa del Rey Qualifiers ==
The following clubs have qualified for the 2022–23 Copa del Rey by virtue of their league finish after reserve teams were excluded:

Group 1
| Position | Team |
|---|---|
| 1st | Pontevedra |
| 2nd | Unión Adarve |
| 3rd | Navalcarnero |
| 4th | Coruxo |
| 5th | Cristo Atlético |

Group 2
| Position | Team |
|---|---|
| 2nd | Sestao River |
| 5th | Arenas de Getxo |
| 6th | San Juan |
| 7th | Racing Rioja |
| 8th | Gernika |

Group 3
| Position | Team |
|---|---|
| 1st | Numancia |
| 3rd | Peña Deportiva |
| 4th | Teruel |
| 5th | Lleida |
| 6th | Ibiza |

Group 4
| Position | Team |
|---|---|
| 1st | Córdoba |
| 2nd | Mérida |
| 3rd | Cacereño |
| 4th | Ceuta |
| 5th | Coria |

Group 5
| Position | Team |
|---|---|
| 1st | Intercity |
| 2nd | La Nucía |
| 3rd | Murcia |
| 4th | Eldense |
| 5th | Hércules |

== See also ==
- 2021–22 La Liga
- 2021–22 Segunda División
- 2021–22 Primera División RFEF
- 2021–22 Tercera División RFEF
