= Gonzalo Riutort =

Spanish football manager (born 1986)

Personal information
- Full name: Gonzalo Riutort Armillas
- Date of birth: 16 January 1986 (age 40)
- Place of birth: Barcelona, Spain

Team information
- Current team: Cornellà (manager)

Youth career
- Years: Team
- PE Manigua
- 1999–2006: Europa

Managerial career
- 2006–2007: Jàbac Terrassa (youth)
- 2007–2011: Europa (youth)
- 2011–2017: Cornellà (youth)
- 2017–2020: Europa (youth)
- 2020–2022: Cornellà (youth)
- 2022–: Cornellà

Gonzalo Riutort Armillas (born 16 January 1986) is a Spanish football manager, currently in charge of UE Cornellà.

== Career ==
Born in Barcelona, Catalonia, Riutort played youth football with hometown sides Penya Espanyolista Manigua and CE Europa but had to retire due to a back injury. After retiring, he started working as a coach in the youth sides of UFB Jàbac Terrassa before returning to Europa in 2007, initially as a manager of the Infantil B team.

Riutort moved to UE Cornellà in 2011, and worked at the club for six years before returning to Europa on 8 June 2017, replacing Walter Pandiani at the helm of the Juvenil A squad. He left the latter club on 17 April 2020, and returned to Cornellà the following day, taking over their Juvenil A side.

On 21 March 2022, Riutort replaced sacked Raúl Casañ at the helm of Cornellà's first team in Primera División RFEF. He made his debut at the helm of the team six days later, in a 2–0 home win over UE Costa Brava.

After helping the club to narrowly avoid relegation, Riutort renewed his contract with the UEC for a further season. He agreed to another one-year extension on 17 April 2023, and led the side to the 11th position in the 2022–23 campaign.

== Managerial statistics ==
As of 15 September 2023

Managerial record by team and tenure
Team	Nat	From	To	Record								Ref
Team	Nat	From	To	G	W	D	L	GF	GA	GD	Win %	Ref
Cornellà	(Spain)	21 March 2022	present	51	18	17	16	65	41	+24	35.29	
Career total				51	18	17	16	65	41	+24	35.29	—
