= Téo James Michel =

Footballer (born 2003)

Personal information
- Date of birth: 3 May 2004 (age 22)
- Place of birth: Paris, France
- Height: 1.73 m (5 ft 8 in)
- Position: Winger

Team information
- Current team: Ibiza Islas Pitiusas
- Number: 18

Youth career
- 2011–2020: Le Blanc-Mesnil SF
- 2020–2021: Châteauroux

Senior career*
Years	Team	Apps	(Gls)
2021–2025	Châteauroux II	59	(5)
2023–2025	Châteauroux	28	(1)
2025–	Ibiza Islas Pitiusas	20	(1)

International career^{‡}
2025–	Haiti	1	(0)
- * Club domestic league appearances and goals as of 15 May 2026 ‡ National team caps and goals as of 13:53, 6 June 2025 (UTC)

Téo James Michel (born 4 May 2004) is a professional footballer who plays as a winger for Spanish Segunda Federación club Ibiza Islas Pitiusas. Born in France, he plays for the Haiti national team.

== Club career ==
A youth product of Le Blanc-Mesnil SF since the age of 7, Michel joined the youth academy of Châteauroux in 2020. On 23 June 2022, he signed his first professional contract with Châteauroux.

== International career ==
Born in France, Michel is of Haitian descent. He was called up to the Haiti national team for a friendly against Azerbaijan on 22 March 2025. He made the final squad for Haiti at the 2025 CONCACAF Gold Cup.
