= Diego Jiménez (footballer, born 1991) =

Spanish footballer

Personal information
- Full name: Diego Jiménez López
- Date of birth: 11 August 1991 (age 35)
- Place of birth: Benavente, Spain
- Height: 1.85 m (6 ft 1 in)
- Position: Centre-back

Team information
- Current team: Ibiza Islas Pitiusas
- Number: 15

Youth career
- 2006–2010: Villarreal

Senior career*
Years	Team	Apps	(Gls)
2010–2012	Villarreal C	72	(3)
2012–2014	Villarreal B	51	(3)
2014–2016	Recreativo	35	(1)
2016–2017	Llagostera	23	(1)
2017–2021	Recreativo	100	(5)
2021–2022	Hércules	30	(4)
2022–2023	UCAM Murcia	11	(0)
2023	Hércules	6	(0)
2023–2024	Linense	33	(3)
2024–	Ibiza Islas Pitiusas	50	(7)
- * Club domestic league appearances and goals as of 15 May 2026

Diego Jiménez López (born 11 August 1991) is a Spanish footballer who plays for Ibiza Islas Pitiusas as a centre-back.

== Club career ==
Born in Benavente, Zamora, Castille and León, Jiménez played youth football with Villarreal CF. He made his senior debut with the C-team, spending two seasons in the Tercera División with the side.

On 28 January 2012, Jiménez made his debut with the reserves in what was his first game as a professional, appearing as a late substitute in a 2–0 away win against Hércules CF in the Segunda División. He continued to be regularly used in the following campaigns, in both the second level and the Segunda División B.

On 1 September 2014, Jiménez signed a two-year deal with Recreativo de Huelva.
