= UD Ibiza B =

Association football club in Spain

Ibiza B
- Full name: Unión Deportiva Ibiza "B"
- Founded: May 2022; 4 years ago
- Ground: Can Misses, Ibiza, Balearic Islands, Spain
- Capacity: 4,500
- President: Amadeo Salvo
- Head coach: Sergio Cirio
- League: División de Honor – Ibiza/Formentera
- 2025–26: División de Honor – Ibiza/Formentera, 4th of 10
Home colours	Away colours	Third colours

Unión Deportiva Ibiza "B" is a Spanish football team based in Ibiza, in the Balearic Islands. Founded in 2022, they are the reserve team of UD Ibiza, and play in the Regional Preferente de Ibiza-Formentera.

== History ==
Ibiza B were created in May 2022, as UD Ibiza wanted a "medium to long-term project" in the "formation of players". The new club started to play in the Regional Preferente de Ibiza-Formentera, while Ibiza ended their affiliation with CF Sant Rafel.

In July 2022, Ibiza B announced former player Sergio Cirio as their manager.

== Season to season ==
Season	Tier	Division	Place
2022–23	6	Reg. Pref.	7th
2023–24	6	Reg. Pref.	6th
2024–25	6	Div. Hon.	3rd
2025–26	6	Div. Hon.	4th
2026–27	6	Div. Hon.	

== See also ==
- UD Ibiza
