= Andrés Palacios (footballer) =

Spanish footballer

Personal information
- Full name: Andrés Palacios Cardona
- Date of birth: 13 June 2005 (age 21)
- Place of birth: Ibiza, Spain
- Height: 1.78 m (5 ft 10 in)
- Position: Midfielder

Team information
- Current team: Cornellà

Youth career
- Ibiza
- 2023–: Cornellà

Senior career*
Years	Team	Apps	(Gls)
2023	Ibiza	1	(0)
2023–	Cornellà	0	(0)
- * Club domestic league appearances and goals as of 20 May 2023

Andrés Palacios Cardona (born 13 June 2005) is a Spanish footballer who plays as a midfielder for UE Cornellà.

== Club career ==
Born in Ibiza, Balearic Islands, Palacios is a youth product of hometown side UD Ibiza. He was an important unit of their Juvenil side during the 2021–22 season, netting 16 goals as the side achieved promotion to the Liga Nacional Juvenil de Fútbol.

Palacios made his first team – and professional – debut at the age of 17 on 20 May 2023, coming on as a late substitute for Cristian Herrera in a 1–0 Segunda División home win over Real Zaragoza, as Ibiza were already relegated.

== Personal life ==
Palacios' father, also named Andrés, is the Head of Dermatology at the Can Misses Hospital.
