= Raúl Casañ =

Spanish footballer & manager (born 1976)

Personal information
- Full name: Raúl Casañ Martí
- Date of birth: 27 September 1976 (age 50)
- Place of birth: Beniparrell, Spain
- Height: 1.75 m (5 ft 9 in)
- Position: Midfielder

Team information
- Current team: Ibiza Islas Pitiusas (manager)

Youth career
- Don Bosco

Senior career*
Years	Team	Apps	(Gls)
1995–1996	Picassent		
1996–1997	Huesca	21	(2)
1997–1998	Badalona	27	(1)
1998–2000	Villarrobledo		
2001–2003	Talavera	66	(1)
2003–2005	Benidorm	31	(0)
2005–2007	Alcoyano	64	(1)
2007–2008	Conquense	30	(0)
2008–2009	Peña Deportiva	33	(0)
2009–2010	Catarroja		
2010–2012	Peña Deportiva	69	(5)
Total		341	(10)

Managerial career
- 2013–2017: Peña Deportiva (youth)
- 2018–2021: Peña Deportiva
- 2021–2022: Cornellà
- 2022–2023: Unionistas
- 2023–: Ibiza Islas Pitiusas
- * Club domestic league appearances and goals

Raúl Casañ Martí (born 27 September 1976) is a Spanish retired footballer who played as a central midfielder, and currently the manager of CD Ibiza Islas Pitiusas.

== Playing career ==
Born in Beniparrell, Valencian Community, Casañ made his senior debut in the Regional Preferente with Picassent CF in 1995, and moved straight to Segunda División B in the following year with SD Huesca. After suffering relegation, he signed for CF Badalona in Tercera División, but joined fellow league team CP Villarrobledo one year later.

Casañ would play in the third and fourth tiers for the remainder of his career, representing Talavera CF, Benidorm CF (achieving promotion to the third division in 2004), CD Alcoyano, UB Conquense and SCR Peña Deportiva. In 2009, after the latter's relegation, he agreed to a deal with Catarroja CF.

On 4 July 2010, Casãn returned to Peña, with the club in the division four. In 2012, he retired at the age of 35.

== Managerial career ==
Immediately after retiring, Casañ became a sporting director of his last club Peña Deportiva, being later named manager of the Juvenil side. On 5 June 2018, following the main squad's relegation to the fourth division, he was named manager of the squad.

Casañ led Peña to an immediate promotion in his first year, and reached the play-offs in his second, missing out a second consecutive promotion after losing to CD Castellón. He also reached the round of 32 of the Copa del Rey in the 2020–21 season, but opted to leave the club on 26 May 2021, after 11 years linked with Peña overall.

Hours after leaving Peña, Casañ was named manager of Primera División RFEF side UE Cornellà for the 2021–22 campaign. The following 21 March, after a four-match winless streak which saw the club enter the relegation zone, he was sacked.

On 15 June 2022, Casañ took over Unionistas de Salamanca CF also in the third division, but was dismissed on 19 February of the following year. On 26 May 2023, he was named at the helm of CD Ibiza Islas Pitiusas in Tercera Federación.

== Managerial statistics ==
As of 21 December 2025

Managerial record by team and tenure
Team	Nat	From	To	Record								Ref
Team	Nat	From	To	G	W	D	L	GF	GA	GD	Win %	Ref
Peña Deportiva	(Spain)	5 June 2018	26 May 2021	104	55	26	23	161	99	+62	52.88	
Cornellà	(Spain)	26 May 2021	21 March 2022	29	10	2	17	26	38	−12	34.48	
Unionistas	(Spain)	15 June 2022	19 February 2023	24	6	9	9	19	29	−10	25.00	
Ibiza Islas Pitiusas	(Spain)	26 May 2023	Present	88	46	21	21	128	72	+56	52.27	
Total				245	117	58	70	334	238	+96	47.76	—
