= SD Ibiza Islas Pitiusas =

Spanish football team

Ibiza Islas Pitiusas
- Full name: Sociedad Deportiva Ibiza Islas Pitiusas
- Nicknames: Sa Deportiva, Els Vermells
- Founded: 2012
- Ground: Can Misses; Ibiza Town, Balearic Islands, Spain
- Capacity: 4,500
- President: (Spain) Antonio Palma
- Head coach: (Spain) Raúl Casañ
- League: Tercera Federación – Group 11
- 2025–26: Segunda Federación – Group 3, 14th of 18 (relegated)
- Website: www.cdibizaip.com
Home colours	Away colours

Sociedad Deportiva Ibiza Islas Pitiusas, known as Ibiza Islas Pitiusas, Ibiza IP or simply Ibiza, is a Spanish football team based in Ibiza Town, in the autonomous community of the Balearic Islands. Founded in 2012, it plays in Tercera Federación – Group 11, holding home matches at Estadi Municipal de Can Misses, with a capacity of 4,500 seats.

In June 2024, the club changed name from Club Deportivo Ibiza Islas Pitiusas to Sociedad Deportiva Ibiza Islas Pitiusas.

== Season to season ==
Season	Tier	Division	Place	Copa del Rey
2013–14	5	Reg. Pref.	10th	
2014–15	5	Reg. Pref.	5th	
2015–16	5	Reg. Pref.	2nd	
2016–17	5	Reg. Pref.	2nd	
2017–18	5	Reg. Pref.	1st	
2018–19	4	3ª	5th	
2019–20	4	3ª	2nd	
2020–21	4	3ª	1st / 1st	First round
2021–22	4	2ª RFEF	6th	First round
2022–23	4	2ª Fed.	16th	Round of 32
2023–24	5	3ª Fed.	1st	
2024–25	4	2ª Fed.	12th	First round
2025–26	4	2ª Fed.	14th	
2026–27	5	3ª Fed.		

- 4 seasons in Segunda Federación/Segunda División RFEF
- 3 seasons in Tercera División
- 2 seasons in Tercera Federación

== Current squad ==
As of 10 February 2026

Note: Flags indicate national team as defined under FIFA eligibility rules; some limited exceptions apply. Players may hold more than one non-FIFA nationality.

No.	Pos.	Nation	Player
1	GK	ESP	Joan Pol
2	DF	ESP	Raúl Castro
3	DF	ESP	Adrián López
4	DF	ARG	Tomás Bourdal
5	DF	ESP	Pep Vidal
6	DF	ESP	Jaume Villar
7	MF	ESP	Antonio Moreno
8	MF	ESP	Mario Riquelme
9	FW	ESP	Álex Sánchez
10	MF	ESP	Marquitos
11	FW	ESP	Carlos Gilbert
12	FW	ESP	Joan Ramón
13	GK	ESP	Edu Frias

No.	Pos.	Nation	Player
14	MF	ESP	Sergio Rico
15	DF	ESP	Diego Jiménez
16	FW	ESP	Fernando Carrasco
17	FW	ESP	Adri Montalbán
18	MF	HAI	Téo James Michel
20	FW	ESP	Pipe
21	FW	ITA	Lorenzo Busi
22	FW	ESP	Javi Cabezas
23	MF	ESP	Pepe Bernal
24	DF	ESP	Fernando Andrada
25	GK	ESP	Sebastián Arenas
—	MF	ESP	Cristian Cruz
