= Suleiman Camara =

Association football player (born 2001)

Personal information
- Full name: Suleiman Camara Sanneh
- Date of birth: 7 December 2001 (age 24)
- Place of birth: Sant Celoni, Spain
- Height: 1.79 m (5 ft 10 in)
- Position: Winger

Team information
- Current team: Slovan Bratislava
- Number: 21

Youth career
- Sabadell
- 2018–2020: Girona

Senior career*
Years	Team	Apps	(Gls)
2020–2022	Girona B	46	(3)
2021–2022	Girona	0	(0)
2022–2024	Ibiza	73	(6)
2024–2026	Racing Santander	54	(3)
2026–	Slovan Bratislava	10	(0)

International career^{‡}
2024–	Gambia	4	(0)
- * Club domestic league appearances and goals as of 31 October 2026 ‡ National team caps and goals as of 29 September 2026

Suleiman Camara Sanneh (born 7 December 2001) is a professional footballer who plays as a winger for Slovak club ŠK Slovan Bratislava. Born in Spain, he plays for the Gambia national team.

== Club career ==
Born in Sant Celoni, Barcelona, Catalonia, Camara joined Girona FC's youth setup from CE Sabadell FC in 2018. He was promoted to the reserves in the Tercera División for the 2020–21 season, and made his senior debut on 18 October 2020 by playing the last ten minutes of a 3–0 away win over UE Figueres.

Camara scored his first senior goal on 25 October 2020, netting the third of a 3–0 home win over UE Vilassar de Mar. He made his first-team debut on 2 December of the following year, replacing Pol Lozano in a 5–1 away routing of Calvo Sotelo Puertollano CF in the season's Copa del Rey.

Camara made his professional debut on 14 December 2021, replacing fellow youth graduate Ricard Artero in a 1–0 away success over SD Huesca, also in the national cup. On 1 July of the following year, he signed a three-year contract with Segunda División side UD Ibiza.

After impressing during the pre-season, Camara made his second division debut on 14 August 2022, starting in a 2–0 home loss against Granada CF. He scored his first professional goal fourteen days later, netting the opener in a 1–1 home draw against Deportivo Alavés, and ended the campaign with one further goal in 37 league appearances as the club suffered relegation.

On 8 August 2024, Camara signed a four-year deal with Racing de Santander in division two. On 3 August 2026, he moved to Slovak side ŠK Slovan Bratislava on a contract of the same duration.

== International career ==
Born in Spain, Camara is of Gambian descent. He was called up to the Gambia national team for a set of 2025 Africa Cup of Nations qualification matches in October 2024.

== Career statistics ==
=== Club ===
As of match played 3 November 2026

Appearances and goals by club, season and competition
Club	Season	League			National cup		Europe		Other		Total	
Club	Season	Division	Apps	Goals	Apps	Goals	Apps	Goals	Apps	Goals	Apps	Goals
Girona B	2020–21	Tercera División	22	1	—		—		—		22	1
Girona B	2021–22	Tercera Federación	24	2	—		—		—		24	2
Girona B	Total		46	3	—		—		—		46	3
Girona	2021–22	Segunda División	0	0	2	0	—		—		2	0
Ibiza	2022–23	Segunda División	36	2	2	1	—		1 (Note: Appearance in La Liga play-offs)	0	39	3
Ibiza	2023–24	Primera Federación	37	4	1	0	—		2 (Note: Appearances in 2024 Primera Federación play-offs)	0	40	4
Ibiza	Total		73	6	3	1	—		3	0	79	7
Racing Santander	2024–25	Segunda División	21	1	2	1	—		—		23	2
Racing Santander	2025–26	Segunda División	33	2	4	1	—		—		37	3
Racing Santander	Total		54	3	6	2	—		—		60	5
Slovan Bratislava	2026–27	Slovak First Football League	10	0	0	0	8 (Note: Appearances in UEFA Champions League)	3	—		18	3
Career total			183	12	11	3	8	3	3	0	205	18

=== International ===
As of match played 29 September 2026

Appearances and goals by national team and year
National team	Year	Apps	Goals
Gambia	2024	2	0
Gambia	2026	2	0
Total		4	0

== Honours ==
Racing Santander

- Segunda División: 2025–26
