= Sergio Cirio =

Spanish footballer (born 1985)

Personal information
- Full name: Sergio Cirio Olivares
- Date of birth: 9 March 1985 (age 41)
- Place of birth: Barcelona, Spain
- Height: 1.63 m (5 ft 4 in)
- Positions: Striker; winger

Team information
- Current team: Ibiza B (manager)

Youth career
- 1995–2001: Barcelona
- 2001–2004: Badalona

Senior career*
Years	Team	Apps	(Gls)
2004–2006	Badalona	24	(0)
2005	→ Mallorca B (loan)	12	(1)
2006–2007	Europa	38	(8)
2007–2008	Atromitos	25	(2)
2008–2009	Orihuela	10	(1)
2009–2010	Prat	45	(31)
2010–2013	Hospitalet	98	(36)
2013–2017	Adelaide United	99	(20)
2017–2021	Ibiza	107	(42)
Total		458	(141)

Managerial career
- 2021–2022: Ibiza (youth)
- 2022–: Ibiza B
- * Club domestic league appearances and goals

Sergio Cirio Olivares (Spanish pronunciation: [ˈseɾxjo ˈθiɾjo]; born 9 March 1985) is a Spanish former professional footballer who played as a striker or left winger. He is currently manager of UD Ibiza B.

== Club career ==
Born in Barcelona, Catalonia, Cirio had a six-year youth spell at FC Barcelona's La Masia, but spent his senior career in Spain in the lower leagues, mainly Segunda División B. He started out with CF Badalona, before moving to CE Europa for the 2006–07 season.

In the 2007–08 campaign, Cirio played for Atromitos F.C. in Greece. He scored his first goal in the Super League on 2 September 2007 in a 2–1 home victory over Levadiakos FC, as his team were eventually relegated as 14th.

After spells with Orihuela CF, AE Prat and CE L'Hospitalet Cirio signed a two-year contract with Adelaide United FC of the A-League on 8 July 2013. He scored his first goal for the club on 18 October, a penalty in a 2–2 draw against Melbourne Victory FC. His first hat-trick in Australia came on 23 February 2014, in a 4–3 away loss to the same opposition.

In July 2017, after 20 goals and seven assists in four seasons, the 32-year-old Cirio returned to Spain and joined amateurs UD Ibiza. He netted 30 times in his first year (play-offs included), and they reached the third tier for the first time ever.

Cirio won another first-ever promotion at the end of 2020–21, now to Segunda División; he was by now only a fringe player due to an Achilles tendon injury. He retired before he had a chance to play professional football in his country, and started working with Ibiza's youth sides.

== Career statistics ==
Appearances and goals by club, season and competition
Club	Season	League			Cup		Continental		Other		Total	
Club	Season	Division	Apps	Goals	Apps	Goals	Apps	Goals	Apps	Goals	Apps	Goals
Badalona	2004–05	Segunda División B	6	0	2	0	—		—		8	0
Badalona	2005–06	Segunda División B	18	0	—		—		1 (Note: Appearances in Segunda División B play-offs)	0	19	0
Badalona	Total		24	0	2	0	—		1	0	27	0
Mallorca B (loan)	2004–05	Segunda División B	12	1	—		—		—		12	1
Europa	2006–07	Tercera División	38	8	0	0	—		—		38	8
Atromitos	2007–08	Super League Greece	25	2	1	1	—		—		26	3
Orihuela	2008–09	Segunda División B	10	1	0	0	—		—		10	1
Prat	2009–10	Tercera División	45	31	0	0	—		—		45	31
Hospitalet	2010–11	Segunda División B	31	13	2	1	—		—		33	14
Hospitalet	2011–12	Segunda División B	28	2	4	2	—		—		32	4
Hospitalet	2012–13	Segunda División B	39	21	1	0	—		6	1	46	22
Hospitalet	Total		98	36	7	3	—		6	1	111	40
Adelaide United	2013–14	A-League	23	8	0	0	—		—		23	8
Adelaide United	2014–15	A-League	29	7	5	6	—		—		34	13
Adelaide United	2015–16	A-League	27	4	3	1	1 (Note: Appearances in AFC Champions League)	1	—		31	6
Adelaide United	2016–17	A-League	20	1	0	0	6	2	—		26	3
Adelaide United	Total		99	20	8	7	7	3	—		114	30
Ibiza	2017–18	Tercera División	36	27	—		—		6 (Note: Appearances in Tercera División promotion play-offs)	3	42	30
Ibiza	2018–19	Segunda División B	31	11	—		—		—		31	11
Ibiza	2019–20	Segunda División B	25	3	1	0	—		1	0	27	3
Ibiza	2020–21	Segunda División B	15	1	2	0	—		—		17	1
Ibiza	Total		107	42	3	0	—		7	3	117	45
Career total			458	141	21	11	7	3	14	4	500	159

== Honours ==
Adelaide United

- A-League Championship: 2016
- A-League Premiership: 2015–16
- FFA Cup: 2014

Individual

- FFA Cup top scorer: 2014 (6 goals)
- Mark Viduka Medal: 2014
- Aurelio Vidmar club champion: 2014–15
- Golden Boots: 2014–15
