= Lluís Elcacho =

Spanish footballer and coach

Personal information
- Full name: Lluís Elcacho Roda
- Date of birth: 6 January 1964 (age 62)
- Place of birth: Lleida, Spain
- Height: 1.78 m (5 ft 10 in)
- Position: Defensive midfielder

Youth career
- Lleida

Senior career*
Years	Team	Apps	(Gls)
1981–1986	Lleida	114	(19)
1986–1994	Oviedo	213	(4)
1994–1996	Lleida	60	(1)
1996–1997	Balaguer	0	(0)
Total		387	(24)

Managerial career
- 1998–2000: Lleida (youth)
- 2000–2001: Lleida (assistant)
- 2002–2003: Atlético Monzón
- 2003–2004: Tàrrega
- 2004–2006: Lleida (assistant)
- 2007–2008: Eivissa
- 2008–2009: Peña Deportiva
- 2009–2011: Balaguer
- 2011: Sporting Mahonés
- 2011–2012: Ascó (assistant)
- 2012–2016: Formentera
- * Club domestic league appearances and goals

Lluís Elcacho Roda (born 6 January 1964 in Lleida, Catalonia) is a Spanish former professional footballer who played as a defensive midfielder.
