= Javi Cabezas =

Spanish footballer

Personal information
- Full name: Francisco Javier Cabezas Chounavelle
- Date of birth: 28 February 1990 (age 36)
- Place of birth: Córdoba, Spain
- Height: 1.76 m (5 ft 9 1/2 in)
- Position: Winger

Team information
- Current team: Ibiza Islas Pitiusas
- Number: 22

Youth career
- 1998–2009: Córdoba

Senior career*
Years	Team	Apps	(Gls)
2009–2010	La Voz	15	(9)
2010–2011	Peñarroya	32	(4)
2011–2012	Pozoblanco	37	(5)
2012–2013	Córdoba B	33	(6)
2013–2015	Córdoba	2	(0)
2013–2014	→ Écija (loan)	17	(3)
2014–2015	→ Huesca (loan)	8	(0)
2015	→ Barakaldo (loan)	10	(0)
2015–2016	La Hoya Lorca	20	(1)
2016–2017	Tudelano	35	(4)
2017–2019	Ebro	63	(6)
2019–2023	La Nucía	106	(6)
2023–2025	Benidorm	56	(8)
2026–	Ibiza Islas Pitiusas	13	(1)
- * Club domestic league appearances and goals as of 15 May 2026

Francisco Javier 'Javi' Cabezas Chounavelle (born 28 February 1990) is a Spanish professional footballer who plays for Segunda Federación club Ibiza Islas Pitiusas as a winger.

== Club career ==
Born in Córdoba, Andalusia, Cabezas made his senior debut in 2009 with local amateurs UD La Voz. In the following three seasons he played in Tercera División, representing Peñarroya CF, CD Pozoblanco and Córdoba CF B.

Cabezas appeared in his first competitive game with Córdoba's first team on 17 October 2012, coming on as a 62nd-minute substitute in a 1–0 away win over CE Sabadell FC in the third round of the Copa del Rey. His first match in Segunda División occurred on 17 February of the following year, when he featured the last 12 minutes of the 1–1 home draw against AD Alcorcón. He finished the campaign with one more league appearance (against Villarreal CF on 3 March).

In July 2013, Cabezas was loaned to Segunda División B club Écija Balompié. After subsequent loans at SD Huesca and Barakaldo CF in the same league, he was released.

Cabezas continued to compete in the third tier the following years, representing La Hoya Lorca CF, CD Tudelano, CD Ebro and CF La Nucía.
