= Alejandro Sánchez Domínguez =

Mexican politician (born 1975)

- Born: 11 March 1975 (age 51); State of Mexico, Mexico
- Occupation: Politician
- Political party: PAN

Alejandro Sánchez Domínguez (born 11 March 1975) is a Mexican politician from the National Action Party. From 2006 to 2009 he served as Deputy of the LX Legislature of the Mexican Congress representing the State of Mexico.
