= Christian Vassilakis =

Spanish association football player

Personal information
- Full name: Christian Vassilakis Garcia
- Date of birth: 28 February 2001 (age 25)
- Place of birth: Valencia, Spain
- Height: 1.78 m (5 ft 10 in)
- Position: Forward

Team information
- Current team: Alzira

Youth career
- 2007–2014: Valencia
- 2014–2015: Villarreal
- 2015–2017: Alboraya
- 2017–2020: Real Madrid

Senior career*
Years	Team	Apps	(Gls)
2020–2022	Real Madrid Castilla	0	(0)
2020–2021	→ Arouca (loan)	1	(0)
2021	→ Tudelano (loan)	8	(0)
2022	→ Móstoles (loan)	3	(0)
2022	Silla	3	(0)
2022–2023	Elche Ilicitano	3	(0)
2023	Torrent	13	(0)
2024	Peña Deportiva	14	(2)
2024–2025	Laredo	30	(4)
2025–	Alzira	9	(1)
- * Club domestic league appearances and goals as of 9 November 2025

Christian Vassilakis Garcia (born 28 February 2001), known as Vassi, is a Spanish professional footballer who plays as a forward for Tercera Federación club Alzira.

== Career ==
Born in Valencia, Vassilakis played for Valencia, Villarreal and Alboraya growing up before joining Real Madrid in 2017. In September 2020, he joined Liga Portugal 2 side Arouca on a season-long loan deal. On 1 November 2020, Vassilakis made his professional debut, coming on as a substitute in a 2–1 win over Vizela. In August 2021, he joined Primera División RFEF side Tudelano on loan for the season. On 28 January 2022, he dropped down a division to join Móstoles on loan until the end of the season.

== Personal life ==
Vassilakis holds both Spanish and Greek citizenship. He is married to Spanish journalist and author Valeria Vegas.
