= Álex Sánchez (footballer, born 2004) =

Spanish footballer

Personal information
- Full name: Alejandro Sánchez Amador
- Date of birth: 3 August 2004 (age 22)
- Place of birth: Ibiza, Spain
- Position: Forward

Team information
- Current team: Ibiza IP
- Number: 9

Youth career
- Peña Deportiva
- 2022–2023: Ibiza

Senior career*
Years	Team	Apps	(Gls)
2021–2022	Peña Deportiva B	3	(3)
2023	Ibiza	2	(1)
2023–	Ibiza IP	81	(1)
- * Club domestic league appearances and goals as of 15 May 2026

Alejandro "Álex" Sánchez Amador (born 3 August 2004) is a Spanish footballer who plays as a forward for CD Ibiza Islas Pitiusas.

== Club career ==
Born in Ibiza, Balearic Islands, Sánchez played for the youth sides of SCR Peña Deportiva, scoring in a regular basis for their Juvenil side during the 2021–22 season, while also playing for the B-team. In April 2022, he also had a trial at Granada CF.

Sánchez signed for UD Ibiza ahead of the 2022–23 campaign, but returned to the youth sides. He made his first team – and professional – debut on 7 May 2023, coming on as a second-half substitute for Cristian Herrera in a 5–0 Segunda División home loss against Albacete Balompié.

Sánchez scored his first professional goal on 20 May 2023, netting the winner in a 1–0 home success over Real Zaragoza.
