= CD Palencia Cristo Atlético =

Association football club in Spain

Cristo Atlético
- Full name: Club Deportivo Palencia Cristo Atlético
- Founded: 1985
- Ground: La Balastera, Palencia, Castile and León, Spain
- Capacity: 8,100
- President: David Nieto
- Head coach: Rubén Gala Zorrilla
- League: Tercera Federación – Group 8
- 2025–26: Tercera Federación – Group 8, 3rd of 18
Home colours	Away colours

Club Deportivo Palencia Cristo Atlético is a Spanish football team based in Palencia, in the autonomous community of Castile and León. Founded in 1985, it plays in Tercera Federación – Group 8, holding home games at Estadio Nueva Balastera, with a capacity of 8,100 seats.

== History ==
Old logo of the club.

Founded in 1985, Cristo Atlético promoted for the first time to the fourth division in 2004, but could not avoid the relegation positions in its first experience. The club came back in 2009 but would not consolidate in the league 2011, when it remained in Tercera División for the first time.

In 2017, Cristo Atlético qualified for the first time to the promotion play-offs to Segunda División B, where after eliminating Real Avilés in the first round, was eliminated after a penalty shootout by Deportivo Alavés B.

=== Club background ===
- Club de Fútbol Cristo Atlético (1985–2007)
- Club Deportivo Cristo Atlético (2007–2017)
- Club Deportivo Palencia Cristo Atlético (2017–present)

== Stadium ==
Until 2012, Cristo Atlético played its games at Estadio Cristo del Otero, with a pitch of artificial turf and located at the feet of the namesake monument. After moving to Estadio Nueva Balastera in that season, Estadio Cristo del Otero is used for the youth teams of the club and for other teams from Palencia.

== Season to season ==
Season	Tier	Division	Place	Copa del Rey
1985–86	7	2ª Reg.	2nd	
1986–87	6	1ª Reg.	1st	
1987–88	5	Reg. Pref.	19th	
1988–89	6	1ª Reg.	4th	
1989–90	6	1ª Reg.	4th	
1990–91	DNP			
1991–92	DNP			
1992–93	DNP			
1993–94	6	1ª Reg.	7th	
1994–95	DNP			
1995–96	6	1ª Reg.	3rd	
1996–97	6	1ª Reg.	2nd	
1997–98	6	1ª Reg.	1st	
1998–99	5	Reg. Pref.	11th	
1999–2000	5	1ª Reg.	18th	
2000–01	6	1ª Prov.	7th	
2001–02	6	1ª Prov.	8th	
2002–03	6	1ª Prov.	1st	
2003–04	5	1ª Reg.	2nd	
2004–05	4	3ª	18th	

Season	Tier	Division	Place	Copa del Rey
2005–06	5	1ª Reg.	4th	
2006–07	5	1ª Reg.	1st	
2007–08	4	3ª	19th	
2008–09	5	1ª Reg.	4th	
2009–10	5	1ª Reg.	2nd	
2010–11	4	3ª	15th	
2011–12	4	3ª	9th	
2012–13	4	3ª	12th	
2013–14	4	3ª	16th	
2014–15	4	3ª	15th	
2015–16	4	3ª	16th	
2016–17	4	3ª	4th	
2017–18	4	3ª	3rd	
2018–19	4	3ª	7th	
2019–20	4	3ª	6th	
2020–21	4	3ª	1st / 2nd	
2021–22	4	2ª RFEF	5th	Second round
2022–23	4	2ª Fed.	14th	First round
2023–24	5	3ª Fed.	6th	
2024–25	5	3ª Fed.	8th	

Season	Tier	Division	Place	Copa del Rey
2025–26	5	3ª Fed.	3rd	
2026–27	5	3ª Fed.		

- 2 seasons in Segunda Federación/Segunda División RFEF
- 13 seasons in Tercera División
- 4 seasons in Tercera Federación
