= Alexander Sánchez =

Peruvian footballer (born 1984)

Personal information
- Full name: Alexander Gustavo Sánchez Reyes
- Date of birth: 6 June 1984 (age 42)
- Place of birth: Lima, Peru
- Height: 1.77 m (5 ft 10 in)
- Position: Attacking midfielder

Senior career*
Years	Team	Apps	(Gls)
2002–2007	Alianza Lima	49	(3)
2006	→ José Gálvez (loan)	30	(4)
2007–2008	GKS Bełchatów	5	(0)
2008	→ Univ. San Martín (loan)	15	(2)
2008–2011	Alianza Lima	95	(15)
2012	Universidad César Vallejo	37	(5)
2013	Juan Aurich	32	(5)
2014	UT Cajamarca	5	(0)
2014	Los Caimanes	14	(1)
2015	Unión Comercio	29	(5)
2016	Melgar	31	(2)
2017	Águilas Doradas	9	(1)
2017	Unión Comercio	12	(0)
2018–2019	Universidad César Vallejo	58	(5)
2020	Deportivo Llacuabamba	5	(0)

International career
2006–2009	Peru	12	(1)
- * Club domestic league appearances and goals

Alexander Gustavo Sánchez Reyes (born 6 June 1984) is a Peruvian former professional footballer who played as an attacking midfielder.

== Club career ==
Sánchez is a former Alianza Lima youth club player that couldn't reach the first team, the then youth club manager Víctor Rivera helped him with some psychological assistance to prevent Alexander to depress for his relegation to the youth team. Finally he could reach the first team but didn't get a chance to play so he was loaned to promoted club José Gálvez FBC during the 2006 season.

There he had a good season and when he returned with Alianza Lima and played in the first team. He played the first games in the first team and he was the best player in the Peruvian derby between Alianza Lima and Universitario de Deportes scoring one goal but after that he didn't play many matches. At the end of the season he signed for GKS Bełchatów in Poland.

In September 2008, he announced that he signed a one-year contract with the club Alianza Lima.

== International career ==
Sánchez has made twelve appearances for the Peru national football team.
