= SCR Peña Deportiva =

Peña Deportiva
- Full name: Sociedad Cultural Recreativa; Peña Deportiva Santa Eulalia
- Founded: 19 March 1935; 91 years ago as Peña Deportiva
- Ground: Estadio Municipal, Santa Eulària, Balearic Islands, Spain
- Capacity: 1,500
- President: Joan Marí
- Head coach: Ramiro González
- League: Segunda Federación – Group 3
- 2025–26: Tercera Federación – Group 11, 3rd of 18 (promoted via play-offs)
Home colours	Away colours

Sociedad Cultural Recreativa Peña Deportiva is a Spanish football team based in Santa Eulària des Riu, in the autonomous community of Balearic Islands. According to its Fundational Act Peña Deportiva was founded on March 21, 1935. It plays in Segunda Federación – Group 3, holding home matches at Estadio Municipal de Santa Eulària des Riu, with a capacity of 1,500 seats.

== History ==
Peña Deportiva was founded in 1935, but did not start to compete until 1949. Deportiva only played in the regional leagues until 1985, when the club were promoted to Tercera Division for the first time. Deportiva played there for 8 seasons, before reaching Segunda Division B for the first time in 1993. However, the club lasted one season before they were relegated.

Peña returned to Segunda B in 2008, but they were again relegated after just one season. They remained in Tercera Division until 2017, when they again managed to reach the third tier. However, relegation followed again after the end of the season. Peña were promoted again in season 2018-19 and remained in 2ª RFEF until 2024-25 when they were relegated to Tercera Federación.

== Season to season ==
Season	Tier	Division	Place	Copa del Rey
1949–50	4	1ª Reg.	4th	
1950–51	4	1ª Reg.	5th	
1951–52	4	1ª Reg.	5th	
1952–53	4	1ª Reg.	2nd	
1953–54	4	1ª Reg.	5th	
1954–55	4	1ª Reg.	5th	
1955–56	4	1ª Reg.	3rd	
1956–57	4	1ª Reg.	5th	
1957–58	4	1ª Reg.	3rd	
1958–59	4	1ª Reg.	3rd	
1959–1970	DNP			
1970–71	4	1ª Reg.	6th	
1971–72	4	1ª Reg.	6th	
1972–73	4	1ª Reg.	5th	
1973–74	DNP			
1974–75	4	Reg. Pref.	4th	
1975–76	4	Reg. Pref.	3rd	
1976–77	4	Reg. Pref.	3rd	
1977–78	5	Reg. Pref.		
1978–79	5	Reg. Pref.		

Season	Tier	Division	Place	Copa del Rey
1979–80	5	Reg. Pref.	2nd	
1980–81	5	Reg. Pref.	6th	
1981–82	5	Reg. Pref.	2nd	
1982–83	5	Reg. Pref.	3rd	
1983–84	5	Reg. Pref.	2nd	
1984–85	5	Reg. Pref.	1st	
1985–86	4	3ª	8th	
1986–87	4	3ª	5th	
1987–88	4	3ª	6th	First round
1988–89	4	3ª	6th	
1989–90	4	3ª	9th	
1990–91	4	3ª	14th	
1991–92	4	3ª	12th	
1992–93	4	3ª	2nd	
1993–94	3	2ª B	18th	Third round
1994–95	4	3ª	7th	First round
1995–96	4	3ª	10th	
1996–97	4	3ª	8th	
1997–98	4	3ª	8th	
1998–99	4	3ª	10th	

Season	Tier	Division	Place	Copa del Rey
1999–2000	4	3ª	4th	
2000–01	4	3ª	6th	
2001–02	4	3ª	5th	
2002–03	4	3ª	9th	
2003–04	4	3ª	1st	
2004–05	4	3ª	3rd	First round
2005–06	4	3ª	1st	
2006–07	4	3ª	8th	Second round
2007–08	4	3ª	3rd	
2008–09	3	2ª B	19th	
2009–10	4	3ª	2nd	
2010–11	4	3ª	6th	
2011–12	4	3ª	6th	
2012–13	4	3ª	1st	
2013–14	4	3ª	3rd	First round
2014–15	4	3ª	3rd	First round
2015–16	4	3ª	3rd	
2016–17	4	3ª	4th	
2017–18	3	2ª B	19th	
2018–19	4	3ª	1st	

Season	Tier	Division	Place	Copa del Rey
2019–20	3	2ª B	4th	First round
2020–21	3	2ª B	8th / 1st	Round of 32
2021–22	4	2ª RFEF	3rd	
2022–23	4	2ª Fed.	2nd	First round
2023–24	4	2ª Fed.	10th	First round
2024–25	4	2ª Fed.	15th	
2025–26	5	3ª Fed.	3rd	
2026–27	4	2ª Fed.		

- 5 seasons in Segunda División B
- 5 seasons in Segunda Federación/Segunda División RFEF
- 31 seasons in Tercera División
- 1 season in Tercera Federación

== Current squad ==
As of 5 April 2024

Note: Flags indicate national team as defined under FIFA eligibility rules; some limited exceptions apply. Players may hold more than one non-FIFA nationality.

No.	Pos.	Nation	Player
1	GK	ESP	Niko Hartmann
2	DF	ESP	Jesús Fortes
3	DF	ESP	Jordan Hernández
5	DF	ESP	Sergio Chica
6	MF	DOM	Omar de la Cruz
7	FW	ESP	Christian Vassilakis
8	MF	ESP	Lolo Garrido
9	FW	ESP	Jaume Tovar
10	FW	ESP	Manuel Salinas
11	MF	ESP	Marc Fraile

No.	Pos.	Nation	Player
12	MF	ESP	Dani Torices
13	GK	ESP	Edu Frías
14	DF	ESP	Gonzalo Pereira
15	DF	ESP	Marc Fuentes
16	MF	ESP	Toni Vicente
17	DF	ESP	David Ámez
19	MF	HON	Álex Mejia
20	FW	ESP	Jon Elorza
21	DF	ESP	Luis Madrigal
22	MF	ESP	Víctor Barroso

== Notable former players ==
- (Andorra) Fernando Silva
- (Philippines) Ángel Guirado

== Notable coaches ==
- (Spain) Lluís Elcacho
- (Spain) Cristóbal Parralo
