= Estadi Municipal de Can Misses =

Multi-use stadium in Ibiza, Spain

Can Misses
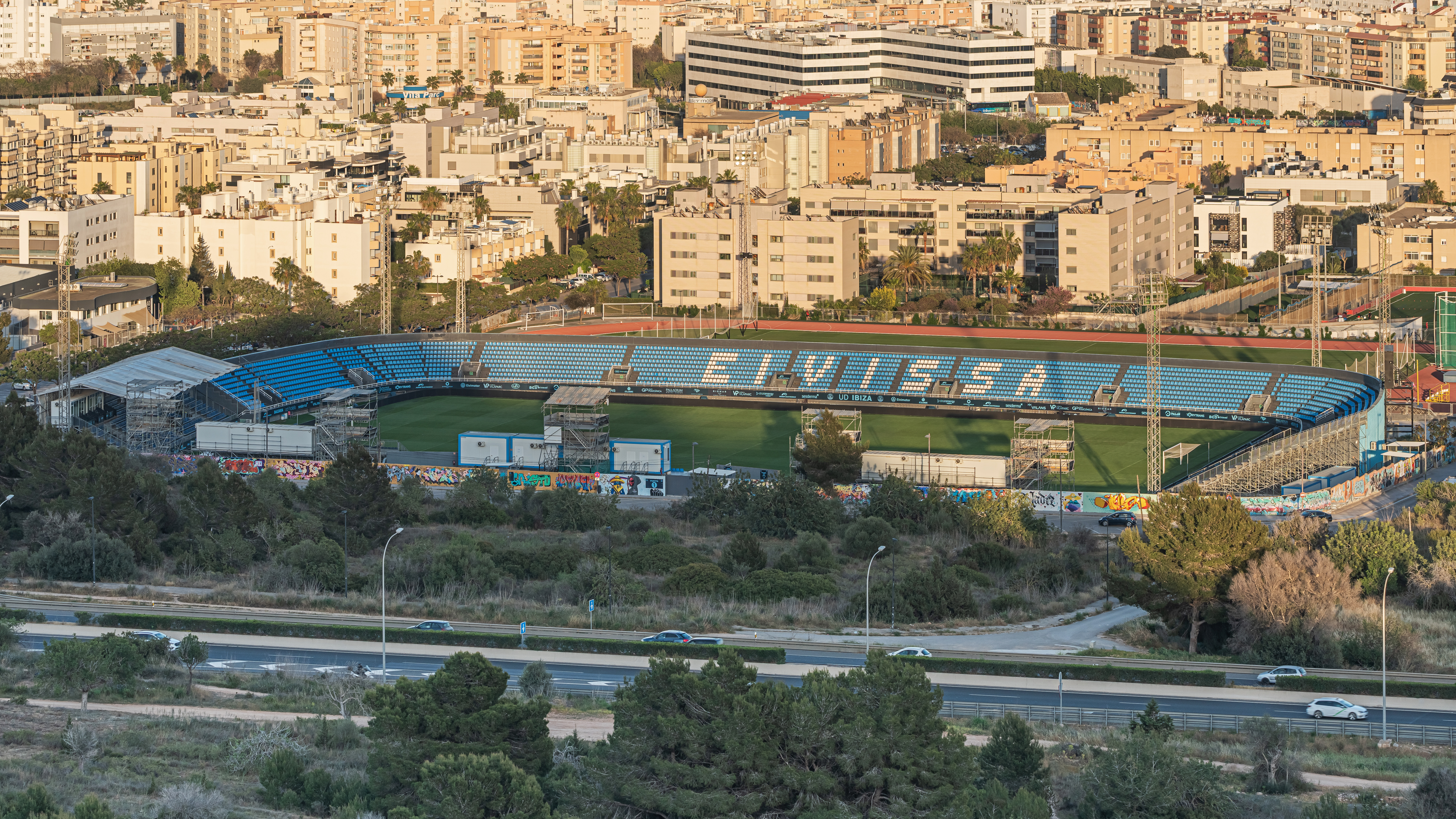
- Interactive map of Can Misses
- Full name: Estadi Municipal de Can Misses
- Address: Calle Campanitx, 27
- Location: Ibiza, Spain
- Coordinates: 38°54′51″N 1°24′55″E
- Owner: Ibiza City Council
- Capacity: 6,000
- Surface: Natural grass
- Field size: 105x68m

Construction
- Built: 1991
- Renovated: 2017; 2018

Tenants
- SD Ibiza (1991–1995); UD Ibiza-Eivissa (1995–2010); CD Ibiza Islas Pitiusas (2012–2021); Ciudad de Ibiza CF (2013–2020); Inter Ibiza CD (2014–2021); UD Ibiza (2015–)

The Estadi Municipal de Can Misses is a multi-use stadium located in Ibiza, Balearic Islands, Spain. It is currently used for football matches and is the home stadium of UD Ibiza.

== History ==
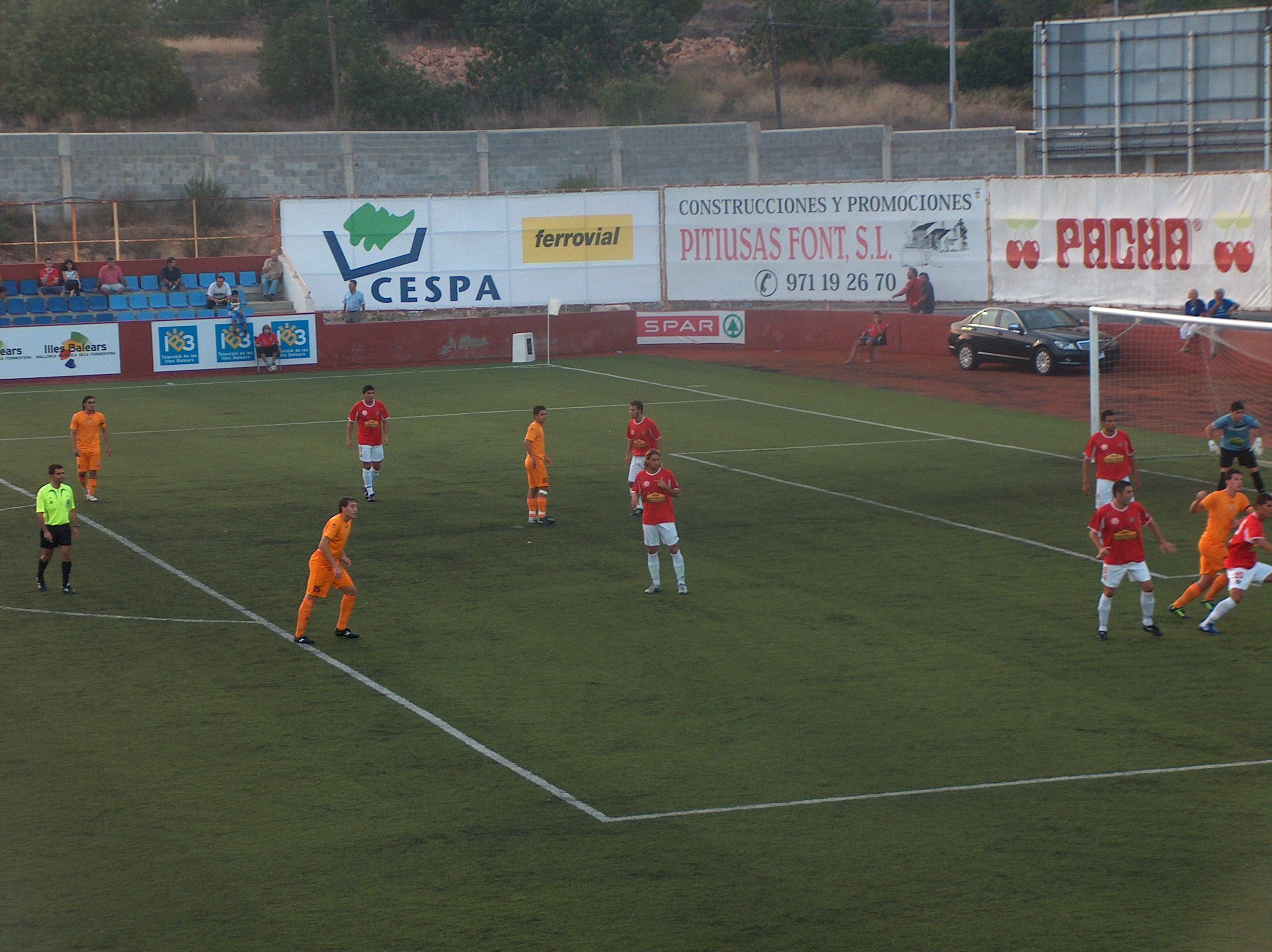
Match between UD Ibiza-Eivissa and Alicante CF in the 2007–08 Copa del Rey

The stadium was built in 1991 in the neighborhood of Can Misses, and was used only by the main clubs in the city, SD Ibiza and UD Ibiza-Eivissa. In 2003, a roofed grandstand was inaugurated, but had to be replaced in 2012 due to a heavy storm. In 2017, the field was replaced by an artificial grass, and in 2018, the stands were renovated and waterproofed.

In the 2010s, several clubs in the city shared the stadium, including UD Ibiza and CD Ibiza Islas Pitiusas which were in the national divisions (Segunda División B and Tercera División, respectively). On 4 June 2021, after UD Ibiza achieved promotion to Segunda División, the City Council reached a two-year agreement with the club for the use of the stadium in an exclusive basis, to comply with the Liga de Fútbol Profesional requirements.
