= Cristian Herrera =

Spanish footballer

Personal information
- Full name: Cristian Ignacio Herrera Pérez
- Date of birth: 13 March 1991 (age 35)
- Place of birth: Las Palmas, Spain
- Height: 1.81 m (5 ft 11 in)
- Position: Striker

Team information
- Current team: Huesca

Youth career
- Las Palmas

Senior career*
Years	Team	Apps	(Gls)
2010–2013	Las Palmas B	83	(39)
2013–2014	Elche B	14	(13)
2013–2015	Elche	47	(4)
2015–2016	Almería	9	(0)
2016–2017	Girona	54	(9)
2017–2021	Lugo	154	(31)
2021–2023	Ibiza	71	(20)
2023–2024	Las Palmas	8	(1)
2024–2026	Deportivo La Coruña	39	(2)
2026–	Huesca	0	(0)
- * Club domestic league appearances and goals as of 31 May 2026

Cristian Ignacio Herrera Pérez (born 13 March 1991) is a Spanish professional footballer who plays as a striker for Primera Federación club Huesca.

== Club career ==
Born in Las Palmas, Canary Islands, Herrera was a product of hometown club UD Las Palmas' youth system. He made senior debut with the reserves in the 2010–11 season, spending several years with the side in the lower leagues.

On 9 July 2013, Herrera rejected a new deal and joined Elche CF Ilicitano in the Segunda División B. On 24 November he made his first-team – and La Liga – debut, playing the last 12 minutes and scoring the winner in a 2–1 home win against neighbouring Valencia CF. On 18 June of the following year, after appearing in 21 matches and netting three goals during the campaign, he renewed his link until 2019 and was definitely promoted to the main squad.

Herrera terminated his contract with the Valencians on 7 August 2015, and signed a one-year deal with UD Almería nine days later. On 1 February 2016, however, he severed his ties and moved to Girona FC also from Segunda División hours later.

On 14 July 2017, Herrera cut ties with the Catalans and agreed to a two-year contract at CD Lugo the same day. On 13 August 2021, he signed a two-year deal with second-division newcomers UD Ibiza.

On 22 June 2023, Herrera joined UD Las Palmas, newly-promoted to the top tier, on a one-year contract. In August 2024, he returned to division two on a one-year deal at Deportivo de La Coruña.

On 28 August 2026, the free agent Herrera moved to SD Huesca, recently relegated to Primera Federación.
