= 2025 Segunda Federación play-offs =

The 2025 Segunda Federación play-offs (Playoffs de Ascenso or Promoción de Ascenso) are the final play-offs for promotion from 2024–25 Segunda Federación to the 2025–26 Primera Federación.

== Format ==
Twenty teams will participe in the promotion play-off. Each of the five groups of the Segunda División RFEF are represented by the four teams that finished the regular season between the second and fifth positions. In the draw for the first stage, the participating teams were assigned to pots corresponding to their final regular season position. While avoiding matches between teams from the same regular season group, second-place finishers were drawn against fifth-place finishers while teams that finished third would play teams that finished fourth. The same draw process was repeated, to the extent that it would be possible, in the draw for the second round.

The five winning clubs of the second stage will reach promotion to Primera RFEF and will accompany the five group champions who had already achieved their promotion.

The final two relegation spots (of 27 total) will also be determined via play-offs. The four 13th-place finishers with the lowest point totals will be drawn into two single-leg matches, with the winners securing survival in the Segunda División RFEF and the losers being relegated to the Tercera División RFEF. The two match-ups will be selected through a random draw and hosted at a venue chosen from among the stadiums selected to host the promotion play-offs.

== Promotion play-offs ==
=== Teams ===
==== Participating teams ====
- Atlético Antoniano
- Atlético Baleares
- Ávila
- Avilés
- Cacereño
- Deportivo Fabril
- Eibar B
- Estepona
- Getafe B
- La Unión Atlético
- Numancia
- Rayo Majadahonda
- Sabadell
- Sant Andreu
- SD Logroñés
- Talavera de la Reina
- Teruel
- Torrent
- UCAM Murcia
- Utebo

==== Road to the play-offs ====
===== Group 1 =====
Pos	Team	Pld	W	D	L	GF	GA	GD	Pts	Qualification
2	Numancia	34	19	10	5	55	24	+31	**67**	Qualification for the promotion play-offs and Copa del Rey
3	Avilés (P)	34	14	13	7	46	38	+8	**55**	Qualification for the promotion play-offs and Copa del Rey
4	Deportivo Fabril	34	16	6	12	48	29	+19	**54**	Qualification for the promotion play-offs
5	Ávila	34	15	7	12	35	29	+6	**52**	Qualification for the promotion play-offs and Copa del Rey

Rules for classification: 1) points; 2) head-to-head points; 3) head-to-head goal difference; 4) goal difference; 5) number of goals scored
(Note: Head-to-head record is used only after all the matches between the teams in question have been played)
(P) Promoted

===== Group 2 =====
Pos	Team	Pld	W	D	L	GF	GA	GD	Pts	Qualification
2	SD Logroñés	34	19	9	6	54	29	+25	**66**	Qualification for the promotion play-offs and Copa del Rey
3	Eibar B	34	18	8	8	45	23	+22	**62**	Qualification for the promotion play-offs
4	Utebo	34	17	10	7	55	34	+21	**61**	Qualification for the promotion play-offs and Copa del Rey
5	Teruel (P)	34	17	9	8	41	28	+13	**60**	Qualification for the promotion play-offs and Copa del Rey

Rules for classification: 1) points; 2) head-to-head points; 3) head-to-head goal difference; 4) goal difference; 5) number of goals scored
(Note: Head-to-head record is used only after all the matches between the teams in question have been played)
(P) Promoted

===== Group 3 =====
Pos	Team	Pld	W	D	L	GF	GA	GD	Pts	Qualification
2	Atlético Baleares	34	17	11	6	49	27	+22	**62**	Qualification for the promotion play-offs and Copa del Rey
3	Sant Andreu	34	17	9	8	64	40	+24	**60**	Qualification for the promotion play-offs and Copa del Rey
4	Sabadell (P)	34	15	11	8	52	32	+20	**56**	Qualification for the promotion play-offs and Copa del Rey
5	Torrent	34	15	10	9	43	35	+8	**55**	Qualification for the promotion play-offs and Copa del Rey

Rules for classification: 1) points; 2) head-to-head points; 3) head-to-head goal difference; 4) goal difference; 5) number of goals scored
(Note: Head-to-head record is used only after all the matches between the teams in question have been played)
(P) Promoted

===== Group 4 =====
Pos	Team	Pld	W	D	L	GF	GA	GD	Pts	Qualification
2	La Unión Atlético	34	21	4	9	38	19	+19	**67**	Qualification for the promotion play-offs and Copa del Rey
3	UCAM Murcia	34	16	12	6	46	22	+24	**60**	Qualification for the promotion play-offs and Copa del Rey
4	Atlético Antoniano	34	17	8	9	41	32	+9	**59**	Qualification for the promotion play-offs and Copa del Rey
5	Estepona	34	14	13	7	43	26	+17	**55**	Qualification for the promotion play-offs and Copa del Rey

Rules for classification: 1) points; 2) head-to-head points; 3) head-to-head goal difference; 4) goal difference; 5) number of goals scored
(Note: Head-to-head record is used only after all the matches between the teams in question have been played)

===== Group 5 =====
Pos	Team	Pld	W	D	L	GF	GA	GD	Pts	Qualification
2	Cacereño (P)	34	19	11	4	57	30	+27	**68**	Qualification for the promotion play-offs and Copa del Rey
3	Talavera de la Reina (P)	34	19	9	6	50	27	+23	**66**	Qualification for the promotion play-offs and Copa del Rey
4	Rayo Majadahonda	34	15	10	9	41	30	+11	**55**	Qualification for the promotion play-offs and Copa del Rey
5	Getafe B	34	15	9	10	48	37	+11	**54**	Qualification for the promotion play-offs

Rules for classification: 1) points; 2) head-to-head points; 3) head-to-head goal difference; 4) goal difference; 5) number of goals scored
(Note: Head-to-head record is used only after all the matches between the teams in question have been played)
(P) Promoted

=== First round ===
==== Qualified teams ====
Group	Position	Team
1	2nd	**Numancia**
2	2nd	SD Logroñés
3	2nd	Atlético Baleares
4	2nd	La Unión Atlético
5	2nd	**Cacereño**

Group	Position	Team
1	3rd	**Avilés**
2	3rd	Eibar B
3	3rd	Sant Andreu
4	3rd	**UCAM Murcia**
5	3rd	**Talavera de la Reina**

Group	Position	Team
1	4th	Deportivo Fabril
2	4th	Utebo
3	4th	**Sabadell**
4	4th	Atlético Antoniano
5	4th	**Rayo Majadahonda**

Group	Position	Team
1	5th	Ávila
2	5th	**Teruel**
3	5th	**Torrent**
4	5th	**Estepona**
5	5th	Getafe B

==== Matches ====
Team 1	Agg.	Team 2	1st leg	2nd leg
**Torrent**	4–1	La Unión Atlético	2–1	2–0
Ávila	2–2 (seed)	**Cacereño**	2–0	0–2
Getafe B	1–2	**Numancia**	0–2	1–0
**Teruel**	6–3	Atlético Baleares	1–1	5–2
**Estepona**	3–2	SD Logroñés	1–1	2–1
**Rayo Majadahonda**	2–1	Sant Andreu	0–0	2–1
Utebo	3–5 (a.e.t.)	**Talavera de la Reina**	1–0	2–5
Deportivo Fabril	1–3	**UCAM Murcia**	0–0	1–3
**Sabadell**	2–1	Eibar B	1–1	1–0
Atlético Antoniano	2–2 (seed)	**Avilés**	0–0	2–2

First leg

10 May 2025	**Ávila**	**2–0**	Cacereño	Ávila
19:00 UTC+2	Safrai 77'; Mario Rivas 90+2' (pen.)	Report		Stadium: Estadio Adolfo Suárez; Attendance: 3,000; Referee: Lluís Balle Reus

10 May 2025	**Torrent**	**2–1**	La Unión Atlético	Torrent
19:00 UTC+2	Matías Chavarría 48'; Juanma Acevedo 63'	Report	Jaime Santos 88' (pen.)	Stadium: Estadio San Gregorio; Referee: Javier García Rubio

10 May 2025	Atlético Antoniano	**0–0**	Avilés	Lebrija
20:00 UTC+2		Report		Stadium: Estadio Municipal; Referee: Johan González Rodríguez

10 May 2025	Estepona	**1–1**	SD Logroñés	Estepona
21:00 UTC+2	Nacho Goma 48'	Report	Raúl Rubio 88'	Stadium: Estadio Francisco Muñoz Pérez; Referee: Leandro Carbajales Gómez

11 May 2025	Getafe B	**0–2**	**Numancia**	Getafe
11:30 UTC+2		Report	Jony 52', 64'	Stadium: Ciudad Deportiva Getafe CF; Attendance: 1,000; Referee: José Antonio Muñoz Blázquez

11 May 2025	Rayo Majadahonda	**0–0**	Sant Andreu	Majadahonda
12:00 UTC+2		Report		Stadium: Estadio Cerro del Espino; Attendance: 1,500; Referee: Alberto Sevillano Marín

11 May 2025	Teruel	**1–1**	Atlético Baleares	Teruel
12:00 UTC+2	José Val 67'	Report	Florin Andone 53'	Stadium: Estadio Pinilla; Attendance: 1,200; Referee: Javier Villaescusa Alarcón

11 May 2025	**Utebo**	**1–0**	Talavera de la Reina	Utebo
12:00 UTC+2	Jaime Barrero 13'	Report		Stadium: Estadio Santa Ana; Attendance: 2,000; Referee: Sergi Carrero Romera

11 May 2025	Deportivo Fabril	**0–0**	UCAM Murcia	A Coruña
19:00 UTC+2		Report		Stadium: Estadio Riazor; Attendance: 5,563; Referee: Gaizka Legarra Gorgoñón

11 May 2025	Sabadell	**1–1**	Eibar B	Sabadell
19:45 UTC+2	Rubén Martínez 13' (pen.)	Report	Lucas Sarasketa 89'	Stadium: Estadi de la Nova Creu Alta; Attendance: 6,620; Referee: Juan José Lidón Rocamora

Second leg

17 May 2025	La Unión Atlético	**0–2** (**1–4** agg.)	**Torrent**	La Unión
18:00 UTC+2		Report	Diego Ruiz 12' (own); Juanma Acevedo 14'	Stadium: Estadio Municipal; Referee: Daniel David Baiges Dones

17 May 2025	**UCAM Murcia**	**3–1** (**3–1** agg.)	Deportivo Fabril	Murcia
19:00 UTC+2	Javi Ramírez 4'; Ale Marín 33'; Amin Bouzaig 78'	Report	Kevin Sánchez 63' (pen.)	Stadium: Estadio de La Condomina; Referee: Carlos Palencia Cerdeño

18 May 2025	**Cacereño**	**2–0** (**2–2** agg.)	Ávila	Cáceres
12:00 UTC+2	Pau Palacín 14'; Marcos Carrillo 90+8'	Report		Stadium: Estadio Príncipe Felipe; Attendance: 7,000; Referee: Alfredo Ramo Andrés

18 May 2025	Atlético Baleares	**2–5** (**3–6** agg.)	**Teruel**	Palma de Mallorca
12:00 UTC+2	Florin Andone 72'; Albert Rosas 81'	Report	Moha 51'; Théo Le Normand 71'; Joel Febas 90+4'; Aimar Peña 90+7'; Ander Dufur 90+8'	Stadium: Estadio Balear; Attendance: 4,000; Referee: Raúl de la Mata Martínez

18 May 2025	**Talavera de la Reina**	**5–2** (**5–3** agg.)	Utebo	Talavera de la Reina
12:00 UTC+2	Isaiah Navarro 12'; Edu Gallardo 60'; Álvaro Sánchez 64'; Rubén Solano 110'; Carlos Arauz 118'	Report	Jaime Barrero 23'; Camilo Leiton 82'	Stadium: Estadio El Prado; Attendance: 5,000; Referee: Roberto Carralero Calvo

18 May 2025	Eibar B	**0–1** (**1–2** agg.)	**Sabadell**	Eibar
12:00 UTC+2		Report	Peque Polo 82'	Stadium: Estadio Municipal Ipurua; Attendance: 1,918; Referee: Omar Álvarez Rodríguez

18 May 2025	Sant Andreu	**1–2** (**1–2** agg.)	**Rayo Majadahonda**	Barcelona
17:00 UTC+2	Max Marcet 85'	Report	Alberto Guti 63'; Kevin Manzano 72'	Stadium: Camp Municipal Narcís Sala; Attendance: 6,513; Referee: Marcelo Ibáñez Suárez

18 May 2025	Numancia	**0–1** (**2–1** agg.)	**Getafe B**	Soria
18:00 UTC+2		Report	Jacobo Alcalde 64' (pen.)	Stadium: Nuevo Estadio Los Pajaritos; Attendance: 6,200; Referee: Gerard Rius Riu

18 May 2025	SD Logroñés	**1–2** (**2–3** agg.)	**Estepona**	Logroño
18:00 UTC+2	José Caro 36' (own)	Report	Eric Gómez 58'; Titi 71'	Stadium: Estadio Las Gaunas; Attendance: 2,600; Referee: Ibai Rezola Etxeberría

18 May 2025	Avilés	**2–2** (**2–2** agg.)	Atlético Antoniano	Avilés
19:30 UTC+2	Jean-Sylvain Babin 45'; Julio Rodríguez 74'	Report	Guti 44'; Mike Cevallos 90+6'	Stadium: Estadio Román Suárez Puerta; Referee: Alberto Gómez Lameiro

=== Second round ===
==== Qualified teams ====
Group	Position	Team
1	2nd	Numancia
5	2nd	**Cacereño**

Group	Position	Team
1	3rd	**Avilés**
4	3rd	UCAM Murcia
5	3rd	**Talavera de la Reina**

Group	Position	Team
3	4th	**Sabadell**
5	4th	Rayo Majadahonda

Group	Position	Team
2	5th	**Teruel**
3	5th	Torrent
4	5th	Estepona

Bold indicates teams that were promoted

==== Matches ====
Team 1	Agg.	Team 2	1st leg	2nd leg
Estepona	3–5	**Cacereño**	1–0	2–5
**Teruel**	1–0	Numancia	0–0	1–0
Torrent	1–3 (a.e.t.)	**Talavera de la Reina**	1–1	0–2
**Sabadell**	2–1	UCAM Murcia	2–1	0–0
Rayo Majadahonda	0–6	**Avilés**	0–2	0–4

First leg

24 May 2025	Teruel	**0–0**	Numancia	Teruel
19:00 UTC+2		Report		Stadium: Estadio Pinilla; Attendance: 1,800; Referee: Pol Arenas Mora

24 May 2025	Torrent	**1–1**	Talavera de la Reina	Torrent
19:00 UTC+2	Christian Albert 89'	Report	Rubén Solano 80'	Stadium: Estadio San Gregorio; Attendance: 3,800; Referee: José María Aranda Delgado

25 May 2025	Rayo Majadahonda	**0–2**	**Avilés**	Majadahonda
12:00 UTC+2		Report	Javi Cueto 60'; Álvaro Santamaría 76'	Stadium: Estadio Cerro del Espino; Attendance: 2,500; Referee: Aitor Barrio Salas

25 May 2025	**Sabadell**	**2–1**	UCAM Murcia	Sabadell
18:00 UTC+2	Rubén Martínez 7'; Miguelete 23'	Report	Rubén del Campo 61'	Stadium: Estadi de la Nova Creu Alta; Attendance: 9,281; Referee: Ignacio de Santisteban Adame

25 May 2025 (Note: The match was stopped in the 80th minute due to objects being thrown onto the pitch. The game resumed the following day at 12:00 behind closed doors.)	**Estepona**	**1–0**	Cacereño	Estepona
21:00 UTC+2	Nacho Goma 73'	Report		Stadium: Estadio Francisco Muñoz Pérez; Attendance: 3,000; Referee: Manuel Ramírez Marco

Second leg

31 May 2025	**Avilés**	**4–0** (**6–0** agg.)	Rayo Majadahonda	Avilés
20:00 UTC+2	Javi Cueto 20', 32'; Davo Fernández 60', 64'	Report		Stadium: Estadio Román Suárez Puerta; Attendance: 8,500; Referee: Federico Javier Sáiz de Villares

31 May 2025	**Cacereño**	**5–2** (**5–3** agg.)	Estepona	Cáceres
20:30 UTC+2	Álvaro Clausí 15'; Pau Palacín 33', 90+5'; Iván Martínez 47'; Álvaro Salinas 57'	Report	Antonio Marchena 28'; Antonio Marín 50'	Stadium: Estadio Príncipe Felipe; Attendance: 8,000; Referee: Pedro Oreiro Hermida

1 June 2025	**Talavera de la Reina**	**2–0** (**3–1** agg.)	Torrent	Talavera de la Reina
12:00 UTC+2	Luis Sánchez 104'; Carlos Arauz 120'	Report		Stadium: Estadio El Prado; Attendance: 4,500; Referee: Juan Francisco Roca Roblés

1 June 2025	Numancia	**0–1** (**0–1** agg.)	**Teruel**	Soria
18:00 UTC+2		Report	Peru Ruiz 90+2' (pen.)	Stadium: Nuevo Estadio Los Pajaritos; Attendance: 8,149; Referee: Ekaitz Ikiñi García Arriola

1 June 2025	UCAM Murcia	**0–0** (**1–2** agg.)	Sabadell	Murcia
19:00 UTC+2		Report		Stadium: Estadio de La Condomina; Attendance: 2,800; Referee: Víctor Manuel Broncano Suárez

== Promoted teams ==
- The five teams that were or would be promoted to Primera Federación through regular season groups and the five play-off winners were included.
- The number of years after the last participation of the club in the third tier is referred to the previous appearance at that level. Depending on the time, it could have been Tercera División (until 1977), Segunda División B (1977–2021) or Primera Federación (2021–present).

Promoted to Primera Federación
Group 1	Group 2	Group 3	Group 4	Group 5
Pontevedra (1st) (2 years later)	Arenas (1st) (4 years later)	Europa (1st) (30 years later)	Juventud Torremolinos (1st) (57 years later)	Guadalajara (1st) (9 years later)
Avilés (3rd) (10 years later)	Teruel (5th) (1 year later)	Sabadell (4th) (1 year later)		Cacereño (2nd) (9 years later)
				Talavera de la Reina (3rd) (2 years later)

== Relegation play-offs ==
=== Table of 13th-placed teams ===
Pos	Grp	Team	Pld	W	D	L	GF	GA	GD	Pts	Qualification or relegation
1	3	Lleida	34	9	18	7	38	30	+8	45	
2	1	Escobedo	34	10	13	11	31	39	−8	43	Qualification for the relegation play-offs
3	5	Real Madrid C	34	10	12	12	34	35	−1	42	Qualification for the relegation play-offs
4	2	Barbastro	34	11	7	16	36	40	−4	40	Qualification for the relegation play-offs
5	4	Villanovense	34	9	11	14	33	39	−6	38	Qualification for the relegation play-offs

Updated to match(es) played on 4 May 2025. Source:
Rules for classification: 1) points; 2) goal difference; 3) number of goals scored

=== Qualified teams ===
Group	Position	Team
1	13th	Escobedo
2	13th	Barbastro
4	13th	Villanovense
5	13th	Real Madrid C

=== Matches ===
Team 1	Agg.	Team 2	1st leg	2nd leg
Villanovense	1–3	Real Madrid C	0–1	1–2
Escobedo	2–3	Barbastro	0–2	2–1

First leg

11 May 2025	Escobedo	0–2	Barbastro	Escobedo
11:45 UTC+2		Report	Javier Albin 57'; Xavier Sola 60'	Stadium: Estadio Eusebio Arce; Referee: Ignacio Bordons Romero

11 May 2025	Villanovense	0–1	Real Madrid C	Villanueva de la Serena
12:00 UTC+2		Report	Álvaro Ginés 45'	Stadium: Estadio Romero Cuerda; Referee: Gorka Mazo Maruri

Second leg

18 May 2025	Barbastro	1–2 (3–2 agg.)	Escobedo	Barbastro
12:00 UTC+2	Konare 90+3'	Report	Saza 70', 84'	Stadium: Estadio Municipal de Deportes; Referee: Joan Masip Vidal

18 May 2025	Real Madrid C	2–1 (3–1 agg.)	Villanovense	Madrid
18:00 UTC+2	Bruno Iglesias 56'; Jacobo Ortega 87'	Report	Ruymán 52'	Stadium: Ciudad Real Madrid; Referee: Jesús López Fernández

== Relegated teams ==
- 27 teams relegated to Tercera Federación: 25 teams through regular season groups and the two play-off losers.
- The numbers of years after the last relegation are referred to the last participation of the club in Tercera División or Tercera Federación if the team was promoted after 2021.

Relegated to Tercera Federación
Compostela (5 years later)	Llanera (1 year later)	Gimnástica Torrelavega (3 years later)	Guijuelo (3 years later)	Laredo (1 year later)	Escobedo (1 years later)
Calahorra (7 years later)	Anguiano (1 year later)	Real Sociedad C (4 years later)	Subiza (1 year later)	Izarra (10 years later)	Cornellà (11 years later)
Peña Deportiva (6 years later)	Alzira (4 years later)	Mallorca B (1 year later)	Badalona Futur (6 years later)	Villanovense (5 years later)	Linense (14 years later)
Cádiz Mirandilla (6 years later)	San Fernando (9 years later)	Don Benito (1 year later)	Recreativo Granada (12 years later)	Unión Adarve (4 years later)	Móstoles URJC (1 year later)
Illescas (2 years later)		Unión Sur Yaiza (1 year later)		Atlético Paso (3 years later)	
