= 2024–25 Segunda Federación =

Segunda Federación
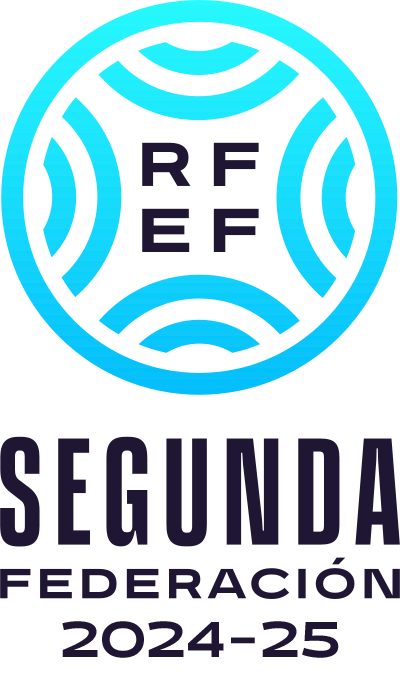
- Season: 2024–25
- Dates: 31 August 2024 – June 2025
- Promoted: Arenas; Avilés; Cacereño; Europa; Guadalajara; Juventud Torremolinos; Pontevedra; Sabadell; Talavera de la Reina; Teruel
- Relegated: Alzira; Anguiano; Atlético Paso; Badalona Futur; Cádiz Mirandilla; Calahorra; Compostela; Cornellà; Don Benito; Escobedo; Gimnástica Torrelavega; Guijuelo; Illescas; Izarra; Laredo; Linense; Llanera; Lleida; Mallorca B Móstoles URJC; Peña Deportiva; Real Sociedad C Recreativo Granada; San Fernando; Subiza; Unión Adarve; Unión Sur Yaiza; Villanovense
- Top goalscorer: Alfredo Sualdea (18 goals)

The 2024–25 Segunda Federación season is the fourth for the Segunda Federación, the fourth highest level in the Spanish football league system. Ninety teams will participate, divided into five groups of eighteen clubs each based on geographical proximity. In each group, the champions automatically promote to Primera Federación, and the second to fifth placers will play promotion play-offs. The last five teams in each group will be relegated to the Tercera Federación; in addition, the four worst teams classified 13th in their group will play play-offs to determine the last two relegation places.

== Overview before the season ==
A total of 90 teams took part: 10 relegated from the 2023–24 Primera Federación, 53 retained from the 2023–24 Segunda Federación and 27 promoted from the 2023–24 Tercera Federación. The groups were defined by the RFEF on 2 July 2024.

On 4 July 2024, RFEF confirmed the administrative relegation of Ursaria due to financial issues, with Móstoles URJC replacing them on 22 July. On 26 July, Eibar ended their affiliation agreement with Vitoria, with Eibar B taking their place.

Teams relegated from 2023–24 Primera Federación

- Atlético Baleares
- Cornellà
- Linares
- SD Logroñés
- Melilla
- Rayo Majadahonda
- Recreativo Granada
- Sabadell
- San Fernando
- Teruel

Teams retained from 2023–24 Segunda Federación

- Águilas
- Alavés B
- Alzira
- Andratx
- Arenas
- Atlético Antoniano
- Atlético Paso
- Real Avilés
- Badalona Futur
- Barbastro
- Cacereño
- Cádiz Mirandilla
- Calahorra
- Compostela
- Coruxo
- Deportivo Aragón
- Deportivo Fabril
- Espanyol B
- Estepona
- Europa
- Gernika
- Getafe B
- Gimnástica Torrelavega
- Guadalajara
- Guijuelo
- Illescas
- Izarra
- La Unión Atlético
- Langreo
- Linense
- Lleida Esportiu
- UD Logroñés
- Marino Luanco
- Navalcarnero
- Numancia
- Orihuela
- Peña Deportiva
- Pontevedra
- Rayo Cantabria
- Real Sociedad C
- San Sebastián de los Reyes
- Sant Andreu
- Talavera de la Reina
- Terrassa
- Torrent
- Tudelano
- UCAM Murcia
- Unión Adarve
- Utebo
- Valencia Mestalla
- Valladolid Promesas
- Villanovense

Teams promoted from 2023–24 Tercera Federación

- Alfaro
- Almería B
- Anguiano
- Ávila
- Bergantiños
- Conquense
- Coria
- Don Benito
- Ejea
- Elche Ilicitano
- Escobedo
- Ibiza Islas Pitiusas
- Juventud Torremolinos
- Laredo
- Llanera
- Mallorca B
- Minera
- Moscardó
- Olot
- Real Madrid C
- Salamanca
- Subiza
- Tenerife B
- Unión Sur Yaiza
- Xerez
- Xerez Deportivo

== Groups ==
=== Group 1 ===
Location of teams in 2024–25 Segunda Federación – Group 1

| Team | Home city | Autonomous Community | Stadium | Capacity |
|---|---|---|---|---|
| Ávila | Ávila | Castile and León | Adolfo Suárez | 6,000 |
| Avilés | Avilés | Asturias | Román Suárez Puerta | 5,400 |
| Bergantiños | Carballo | Galicia | As Eiroas | 5,000 |
| Compostela | Santiago de Compostela | Galicia | Vero Boquete | 16,666 |
| Coruxo | Vigo | Galicia | O Vao | 2,200 |
| Deportivo Fabril | Abegondo | Galicia | Cidade Deportiva de Abegondo | 1,000 |
| Escobedo | Escobedo, Camargo | Cantabria | Eusebio Arce | 2,000 |
| Gimnástica Torrelavega | Torrelavega | Cantabria | El Malecón | 6,007 |
| Guijuelo | Guijuelo | Castile and León | Municipal de Guijuelo | 1,500 |
| Langreo | Langreo | Asturias | Ganzábal | 4,024 |
| Laredo | Laredo | Cantabria | San Lorenzo | 3,000 |
| Llanera | Llanera | Asturias | Pepe Quimarán | 1,000 |
| Marino Luanco | Luanco | Asturias | Miramar | 3,500 |
| Numancia | Soria | Castile and León | Los Pajaritos | 8,261 |
| Pontevedra | Pontevedra | Galicia | Pasarón | 12,000 |
| Rayo Cantabria | Santander | Cantabria | La Albericia | 600 |
| Salamanca | Salamanca | Castile and León | Helmántico | 17,341 |
| Valladolid Promesas | Valladolid | Castile and León | Anexos José Zorrilla | 1,500 |

==== League table ====
| Pos | Team | Pld | W | D | L | GF | GA | GD | Pts | Qualification |
|---|---|---|---|---|---|---|---|---|---|---|
| 1 | Pontevedra (C, P) | 34 | 22 | 6 | 6 | 51 | 30 | +21 | 72 | Promotion to Primera Federación and qualification to Copa del Rey |
| 2 | Numancia | 34 | 19 | 10 | 5 | 55 | 24 | +31 | 67 | Qualification for the promotion play-offs and Copa del Rey |
| 3 | Avilés (P) | 34 | 14 | 13 | 7 | 46 | 38 | +8 | 55 | Qualification for the promotion play-offs and Copa del Rey |
| 4 | Deportivo Fabril | 34 | 16 | 6 | 12 | 48 | 29 | +19 | 54 | Qualification for the promotion play-offs |
| 5 | Ávila | 34 | 15 | 7 | 12 | 35 | 29 | +6 | 52 | Qualification for the promotion play-offs and Copa del Rey |
| 6 | Langreo | 34 | 13 | 11 | 10 | 34 | 35 | −1 | 50 | Qualification for the Copa del Rey |
| 7 | Rayo Cantabria | 34 | 13 | 9 | 12 | 55 | 44 | +11 | 48 | |
| 8 | Bergantiños | 34 | 13 | 8 | 13 | 50 | 47 | +3 | 47 (Note: Bergantiños finished ahead of Salamanca on head-to-head points: Salamanca 1–5 Bergantiños, Bergantiños 2–1 Salamanca) | |
| 9 | Salamanca | 34 | 13 | 8 | 13 | 43 | 48 | −5 | 47 | |
| 10 | Marino Luanco | 34 | 12 | 9 | 13 | 38 | 36 | +2 | 45 (Note: Marino Luanco finished ahead of Coruxo on head-to-head points: Marino Luanco 1–0 Coruxo, Coruxo 1–1 Marino Luanco) | |
| 11 | Coruxo | 34 | 12 | 9 | 13 | 36 | 33 | +3 | 45 | |
| 12 | Valladolid Promesas | 34 | 11 | 11 | 12 | 42 | 43 | −1 | 44 | |
| 13 | Escobedo (R) | 34 | 10 | 13 | 11 | 31 | 39 | −8 | 43 | Qualification for the relegation play-offs |
| 14 | Compostela (R) | 34 | 10 | 9 | 15 | 35 | 44 | −9 | 39 | Relegation to Tercera Federación |
| 15 | Llanera (R) | 34 | 9 | 11 | 14 | 33 | 46 | −13 | 38 | Relegation to Tercera Federación |
| 16 | Gimnástica Torrelavega (R) | 34 | 7 | 10 | 17 | 38 | 47 | −9 | 31 | Relegation to Tercera Federación |
| 17 | Guijuelo (R) | 34 | 6 | 12 | 16 | 27 | 50 | −23 | 30 | Relegation to Tercera Federación |
| 18 | Laredo (R) | 34 | 4 | 12 | 18 | 25 | 60 | −35 | 24 | Relegation to Tercera Federación |

Rules for classification: 1) points; 2) head-to-head points; 3) head-to-head goal difference; 4) goal difference; 5) number of goals scored
(Note: Head-to-head record is used only after all the matches between the teams in question have been played)
(C) Champions; (P) Promoted; (R) Relegated

==== Results ====
| Home \ Away | AVI | AVS | BER | COM | COR | FAB | ESC | GIM | GUI | LAN | LAR | LLA | MAR | NUM | PON | RCA | SAL | VAL |
|---|---|---|---|---|---|---|---|---|---|---|---|---|---|---|---|---|---|---|
| Ávila | — | 0–0 | 0–1 | 2–1 | 3–2 | 1–0 | 0–1 | 3–2 | 1–0 | 0–0 | 1–0 | 2–0 | 1–0 | 0–0 | 1–2 | 4–0 | 0–1 | 2–3 |
| Avilés | 2–0 | — | 3–0 | 0–0 | 2–0 | 0–2 | 4–3 | 2–2 | 3–0 | 0–0 | 3–0 | 1–0 | 1–0 | 0–2 | 1–0 | 2–2 | 2–1 | 2–0 |
| Bergantiños | 2–1 | 4–1 | — | 0–4 | 0–1 | 2–1 | 1–4 | 2–0 | 2–3 | 1–2 | 1–1 | 2–2 | 1–2 | 1–1 | 1–1 | 3–3 | 2–1 | 3–2 |
| Compostela | 0–0 | 1–1 | 0–2 | — | 1–0 | 0–3 | 1–2 | 3–1 | 1–0 | 0–2 | 2–1 | 1–0 | 4–2 | 2–2 | 2–2 | 1–2 | 1–0 | 1–1 |
| Coruxo | 0–1 | 2–2 | 2–1 | 2–0 | — | 3–1 | 3–0 | 1–1 | 0–1 | 3–0 | 1–1 | 1–0 | 1–1 | 1–2 | 0–1 | 1–0 | 2–3 | 0–0 |
| Deportivo Fabril | 0–1 | 0–0 | 2–1 | 2–0 | 0–1 | — | 4–0 | 3–0 | 1–0 | 1–1 | 3–0 | 2–1 | 0–0 | 0–2 | 3–0 | 0–1 | 0–1 | 0–0 |
| Escobedo | 1–0 | 1–1 | 1–1 | 0–0 | 0–0 | 0–1 | — | 1–1 | 2–0 | 0–2 | 0–0 | 4–0 | 0–0 | 2–1 | 0–2 | 0–5 | 1–1 | 1–4 |
| Gimnástica Torrelavega | 0–1 | 1–3 | 1–3 | 2–0 | 0–0 | 1–1 | 0–1 | — | 0–0 | 0–1 | 3–0 | 0–0 | 0–1 | 1–0 | 5–1 | 1–1 | 1–2 | 4–0 |
| Guijuelo | 1–1 | 2–1 | 0–0 | 1–0 | 0–2 | 0–1 | 1–1 | 1–0 | — | 0–0 | 1–1 | 0–1 | 2–1 | 1–4 | 0–1 | 1–4 | 0–1 | 1–2 |
| Langreo | 0–1 | 0–2 | 1–4 | 2–1 | 2–2 | 0–3 | 1–0 | 4–2 | 3–0 | — | 1–1 | 1–0 | 2–1 | 0–0 | 0–2 | 0–2 | 3–1 | 1–1 |
| Laredo | 0–0 | 2–2 | 0–1 | 0–3 | 0–2 | 1–5 | 1–0 | 0–2 | 3–3 | 0–0 | — | 0–0 | 3–1 | 1–3 | 0–3 | 2–1 | 0–3 | 0–1 |
| Llanera | 1–1 | 1–1 | 1–0 | 1–1 | 1–2 | 2–2 | 0–2 | 2–1 | 1–1 | 0–1 | 2–1 | — | 3–2 | 1–4 | 0–0 | 4–3 | 0–0 | 1–0 |
| Marino Luanco | 0–1 | 0–2 | 1–1 | 0–2 | 1–0 | 2–0 | 1–1 | 2–0 | 1–1 | 0–1 | 2–1 | 3–1 | — | 1–0 | 0–0 | 2–1 | 3–0 | 4–0 |
| Numancia | 2–0 | 3–0 | 1–0 | 2–0 | 1–0 | 1–0 | 1–1 | 3–0 | 2–2 | 1–1 | 0–0 | 3–3 | 1–0 | — | 2–0 | 1–0 | 2–0 | 3–1 |
| Pontevedra | 3–2 | 1–1 | 1–0 | 4–1 | 1–0 | 2–1 | 2–0 | 2–1 | 1–0 | 2–1 | 4–2 | 2–0 | 0–1 | 1–0 | — | 2–1 | 3–1 | 1–0 |
| Rayo Cantabria | 0–2 | 4–1 | 1–2 | 2–1 | 1–1 | 1–2 | 0–0 | 0–1 | 2–2 | 1–0 | 0–0 | 2–0 | 4–2 | 2–1 | 2–1 | — | 1–2 | 2–2 |
| Salamanca | 2–1 | 0–0 | 1–5 | 2–2 | 3–0 | 3–2 | 0–1 | 1–1 | 1–1 | 3–1 | 5–1 | 0–3 | 0–0 | 1–1 | 1–3 | 0–3 | — | 1–2 |
| Valladolid Promesas | 2–1 | 4–0 | 1–0 | 1–0 | 2–0 | 1–2 | 0–0 | 3–3 | 5–1 | 0–0 | 1–2 | 0–1 | 1–1 | 1–3 | 0–0 | 1–1 | 0–1 | — |

Legend: Blue = home team win; Yellow = draw; Red = away team win.

=== Group 2 ===
Location of teams in 2024–25 Segunda Federación – Group 2
Location of teams in 2024–25 Segunda Federación – Group 2 (Basque Country)

| Team | Home city | Autonomous Community | Stadium | Capacity |
|---|---|---|---|---|
| Alavés B | Vitoria | Basque Country | José Luis Compañón | 2,500 |
| Alfaro | Alfaro | La Rioja | La Molineta | 4,000 |
| Anguiano | Anguiano | La Rioja | Isla | 1,000 |
| Arenas | Getxo | Basque Country | Gobela | 2,000 |
| Barbastro | Barbastro | Aragon | Municipal de Deportes | 5,000 |
| Calahorra | Calahorra | La Rioja | La Planilla | 4,500 |
| Deportivo Aragón | Zaragoza | Aragon | Ciudad Deportiva | 2,500 |
| Eibar B | Eibar | Basque Country | Unbe | 4,000 |
| Ejea | Ejea de los Caballeros | Aragon | Luchán | 2,249 |
| Gernika | Gernika-Lumo | Basque Country | Urbieta | 3,000 |
| Izarra | Estella-Lizarra | Navarre | Merkatondoa | 3,500 |
| SD Logroñés | Logroño | La Rioja | Las Gaunas | 16,000 |
| UD Logroñés | Logroño | La Rioja | Las Gaunas | 16,000 |
| Real Sociedad C | San Sebastián | Basque Country | José Luis Orbegozo | 2,500 |
| Subiza | Subiza | Navarre | Sotoburu | 1,000 |
| Teruel | Teruel | Aragon | Pinilla | 4,500 |
| Tudelano | Tudela | Navarre | Ciudad de Tudela | 11,000 |
| Utebo | Utebo | Aragon | Santa Ana | 5,000 |

==== League table ====
| Pos | Team | Pld | W | D | L | GF | GA | GD | Pts | Qualification |
|---|---|---|---|---|---|---|---|---|---|---|
| 1 | Arenas (C, P) | 34 | 21 | 7 | 6 | 50 | 24 | +26 | 70 | Promotion to Primera Federación and qualification to Copa del Rey |
| 2 | SD Logroñés | 34 | 19 | 9 | 6 | 54 | 29 | +25 | 66 | Qualification for the promotion play-offs and Copa del Rey |
| 3 | Eibar B | 34 | 18 | 8 | 8 | 45 | 23 | +22 | 62 | Qualification for the promotion play-offs |
| 4 | Utebo | 34 | 17 | 10 | 7 | 55 | 34 | +21 | 61 | Qualification for the promotion play-offs and Copa del Rey |
| 5 | Teruel (P) | 34 | 17 | 9 | 8 | 41 | 28 | +13 | 60 | Qualification for the promotion play-offs and Copa del Rey |
| 6 | UD Logroñés | 34 | 14 | 13 | 7 | 42 | 21 | +21 | 55 | Qualification for the Copa del Rey |
| 7 | Ejea | 34 | 13 | 12 | 9 | 46 | 34 | +12 | 51 | |
| 8 | Alavés B | 34 | 12 | 13 | 9 | 35 | 32 | +3 | 49 | |
| 9 | Deportivo Aragón | 34 | 13 | 5 | 16 | 43 | 48 | −5 | 44 | |
| 10 | Alfaro | 34 | 12 | 7 | 15 | 32 | 47 | −15 | 43 (Note: Head-to-head points: Alfaro 7 pts, Tudelano 5 pts, Gernika 4 pts) | |
| 11 | Tudelano | 34 | 11 | 10 | 13 | 43 | 43 | 0 | 43 | |
| 12 | Gernika | 34 | 11 | 10 | 13 | 39 | 48 | −9 | 43 | |
| 13 | Barbastro (O) | 34 | 11 | 7 | 16 | 36 | 40 | −4 | 40 | Qualification for the relegation play-offs |
| 14 | Calahorra (R) | 34 | 9 | 12 | 13 | 28 | 39 | −11 | 39 | Relegation to Tercera Federación |
| 15 | Anguiano (R) | 34 | 11 | 5 | 18 | 32 | 49 | −17 | 38 | Relegation to Tercera Federación |
| 16 | Real Sociedad C (R) | 34 | 8 | 5 | 21 | 31 | 57 | −26 | 29 | Relegation to Tercera Federación |
| 17 | Subiza (R) | 34 | 8 | 4 | 22 | 36 | 60 | −24 | 28 | Relegation to Tercera Federación |
| 18 | Izarra (R) | 34 | 5 | 6 | 23 | 31 | 63 | −32 | 21 | Relegation to Tercera Federación |

Rules for classification: 1) points; 2) head-to-head points; 3) head-to-head goal difference; 4) goal difference; 5) number of goals scored
(Note: Head-to-head record is used only after all the matches between the teams in question have been played)
(C) Champions; (O) Play-off winners; (P) Promoted; (R) Relegated

==== Results ====
| Home \ Away | ALA | ALF | ANG | ARE | BAR | CAL | ARA | EIB | EJE | GER | IZA | SDL | UDL | RSO | SUB | TER | TUD | UTE |
|---|---|---|---|---|---|---|---|---|---|---|---|---|---|---|---|---|---|---|
| Alavés B | — | 0–1 | 1–0 | 1–1 | 1–0 | 3–0 | 2–2 | 0–3 | 0–1 | 0–1 | 1–1 | 0–3 | 1–1 | 2–1 | 1–0 | 0–1 | 1–2 | 1–1 |
| Alfaro | 2–4 | — | 1–2 | 0–0 | 0–1 | 0–0 | 2–0 | 1–0 | 0–0 | 2–1 | 1–0 | 1–4 | 0–0 | 1–0 | 2–0 | 0–1 | 0–3 | 4–2 |
| Anguiano | 1–2 | 0–2 | — | 1–0 | 0–3 | 1–1 | 0–2 | 1–3 | 0–0 | 0–0 | 2–1 | 0–1 | 2–1 | 0–0 | 1–2 | 2–0 | 2–4 | 2–1 |
| Arenas | 1–0 | 2–0 | 2–1 | — | 2–1 | 2–0 | 2–0 | 1–1 | 1–0 | 4–1 | 4–1 | 2–3 | 1–0 | 1–2 | 2–0 | 2–0 | 3–2 | 0–0 |
| Barbastro | 0–1 | 0–1 | 1–0 | 1–2 | — | 0–1 | 0–0 | 0–1 | 2–0 | 2–0 | 3–2 | 2–3 | 1–0 | 3–0 | 2–0 | 2–1 | 2–2 | 0–0 |
| Calahorra | 1–1 | 0–0 | 1–1 | 0–1 | 2–2 | — | 0–2 | 2–1 | 1–1 | 0–0 | 2–1 | 1–4 | 1–0 | 1–0 | 0–1 | 2–0 | 0–3 | 1–0 |
| Deportivo Aragón | 1–1 | 3–2 | 1–2 | 2–4 | 3–1 | 2–3 | — | 2–1 | 3–2 | 1–1 | 2–0 | 1–2 | 0–4 | 1–2 | 2–1 | 1–0 | 2–1 | 0–2 |
| Eibar B | 1–0 | 4–0 | 1–0 | 0–0 | 0–1 | 1–0 | 2–0 | — | 2–1 | 1–2 | 1–2 | 1–1 | 1–0 | 2–0 | 2–0 | 0–0 | 2–2 | 1–0 |
| Ejea | 1–1 | 2–0 | 2–1 | 0–1 | 0–0 | 2–2 | 1–0 | 0–0 | — | 1–0 | 1–0 | 0–1 | 3–0 | 1–0 | 3–2 | 1–1 | 2–0 | 2–2 |
| Gernika | 1–1 | 0–1 | 1–0 | 0–3 | 2–1 | 1–0 | 3–2 | 0–4 | 2–2 | — | 5–2 | 1–0 | 2–2 | 3–0 | 1–1 | 0–1 | 1–1 | 1–1 |
| Izarra | 0–0 | 1–4 | 0–1 | 1–1 | 1–1 | 1–1 | 1–0 | 0–1 | 0–2 | 0–2 | — | 1–2 | 0–1 | 4–0 | 1–5 | 1–2 | 0–1 | 0–1 |
| SD Logroñés | 0–0 | 4–1 | 0–1 | 2–1 | 0–0 | 1–0 | 1–1 | 2–0 | 2–1 | 3–1 | 2–3 | — | 0–0 | 0–0 | 3–0 | 1–1 | 1–1 | 0–1 |
| UD Logroñés | 1–1 | 1–0 | 3–0 | 0–0 | 3–0 | 2–1 | 1–0 | 1–1 | 2–0 | 3–1 | 4–0 | 1–1 | — | 3–0 | 3–0 | 0–0 | 0–0 | 1–1 |
| Real Sociedad C | 1–2 | 2–2 | 4–2 | 0–2 | 1–0 | 1–1 | 0–3 | 0–1 | 1–3 | 2–0 | 3–1 | 0–1 | 0–1 | — | 2–1 | 3–1 | 2–3 | 0–0 |
| Subiza | 0–2 | 3–0 | 0–3 | 0–1 | 2–1 | 1–1 | 2–0 | 0–1 | 1–6 | 2–2 | 1–3 | 2–3 | 0–0 | 3–1 | — | 1–2 | 0–1 | 0–2 |
| Teruel | 1–1 | 4–0 | 5–0 | 1–0 | 2–0 | 1–0 | 0–1 | 1–1 | 2–2 | 2–1 | 1–0 | 2–1 | 0–0 | 2–1 | 1–0 | — | 1–1 | 1–0 |
| Tudelano | 1–2 | 1–1 | 2–0 | 0–1 | 2–1 | 0–1 | 0–2 | 1–3 | 2–1 | 1–2 | 1–1 | 0–1 | 1–3 | 2–0 | 1–3 | 0–1 | — | 1–1 |
| Utebo | 0–1 | 2–0 | 1–3 | 3–0 | 5–2 | 2–1 | 2–1 | 2–1 | 2–2 | 2–0 | 4–1 | 2–1 | 2–0 | 4–2 | 4–2 | 3–2 | 0–0 | — |

Legend: Blue = home team win; Yellow = draw; Red = away team win.

=== Group 3 ===
Location of teams in 2024–25 Segunda Federación – Group 3
Location of teams in 2024–25 Segunda Federación – Group 3 (Province of Barcelona)

| Team | Home city | Autonomous Community | Stadium | Capacity |
|---|---|---|---|---|
| Alzira | Alzira | Valencian Community | Luis Suñer Picó | 5,000 |
| Andratx | Andratx | Balearic Islands | Sa Plana | 600 |
| Atlético Baleares | Palma | Balearic Islands | Estadi Balear | 6,000 |
| Badalona Futur | Premià de Dalt | Catalonia | Camp Municipal de Premià de Dalt | 1,200 |
| Cornellà | Cornellà | Catalonia | Nou Estadi Municipal de Cornellà | 5,824 |
| Elche Ilicitano | Elche | Valencian Community | José Díaz Iborra | 1,500 |
| Espanyol B | Barcelona | Catalonia | Dani Jarque | 1,520 |
| Europa | Barcelona | Catalonia | Nou Sardenya | 7,000 |
| Ibiza Islas Pitiusas | Ibiza | Balearic Islands | Can Misses | 4,500 |
| Lleida | Lleida | Catalonia | Camp d'Esports | 13,500 |
| Mallorca B | Palma | Balearic Islands | Son Bibiloni | 1,500 |
| Olot | Olot | Catalonia | Municipal d'Olot | 3,000 |
| Peña Deportiva | Santa Eulària des Riu | Balearic Islands | Municipal de Santa Eulària | 1,500 |
| Sabadell | Sabadell | Catalonia | Nova Creu Alta | 11,908 |
| Sant Andreu | Barcelona | Catalonia | Narcís Sala | 6,653 |
| Terrassa | Terrassa | Catalonia | Olímpic | 11,500 |
| Torrent | Torrent | Valencian Community | San Gregorio | 3,000 |
| Valencia Mestalla | Paterna | Valencian Community | Antonio Puchades | 2,300 |

==== League table ====
| Pos | Team | Pld | W | D | L | GF | GA | GD | Pts | Qualification |
|---|---|---|---|---|---|---|---|---|---|---|
| 1 | Europa (C, P) | 34 | 21 | 6 | 7 | 60 | 34 | +26 | 69 | Promotion to Primera Federación and qualification to Copa del Rey |
| 2 | Atlético Baleares | 34 | 17 | 11 | 6 | 49 | 27 | +22 | 62 | Qualification for the promotion play-offs and Copa del Rey |
| 3 | Sant Andreu | 34 | 17 | 9 | 8 | 64 | 40 | +24 | 60 | Qualification for the promotion play-offs and Copa del Rey |
| 4 | Sabadell (P) | 34 | 15 | 11 | 8 | 52 | 32 | +20 | 56 | Qualification for the promotion play-offs and Copa del Rey |
| 5 | Torrent | 34 | 15 | 10 | 9 | 43 | 35 | +8 | 55 | Qualification for the promotion play-offs and Copa del Rey |
| 6 | Valencia Mestalla | 34 | 15 | 8 | 11 | 41 | 35 | +6 | 53 | |
| 7 | Espanyol B | 34 | 13 | 12 | 9 | 40 | 34 | +6 | 51 (Note: Espanyol B finished ahead of Terrassa on overall goals scored) | |
| 8 | Terrassa | 34 | 14 | 9 | 11 | 38 | 32 | +6 | 51 | |
| 9 | Andratx | 34 | 14 | 7 | 13 | 38 | 42 | −4 | 49 | |
| 10 | Elche Ilicitano | 34 | 12 | 11 | 11 | 43 | 38 | +5 | 47 (Note: Elche Ilicitano finished ahead of Olot on overall goal difference) | |
| 11 | Olot | 34 | 12 | 11 | 11 | 35 | 35 | 0 | 47 | |
| 12 | Ibiza Islas Pitiusas | 34 | 12 | 10 | 12 | 37 | 37 | 0 | 46 | |
| 13 | Lleida (Note: Lleida was relegated to 2025–26 Tercera Federación after the season for not paying their players.) (R) | 34 | 9 | 18 | 7 | 38 | 30 | +8 | 45 | Relegation to Tercera Federación |
| 14 | Cornellà (R) | 34 | 9 | 11 | 14 | 39 | 47 | −8 | 38 | Relegation to Tercera Federación |
| 15 | Peña Deportiva (R) | 34 | 8 | 11 | 15 | 34 | 42 | −8 | 35 | Relegation to Tercera Federación |
| 16 | Alzira (R) | 34 | 7 | 9 | 18 | 29 | 58 | −29 | 30 | Relegation to Tercera Federación |
| 17 | Mallorca B (R) | 34 | 4 | 6 | 24 | 22 | 61 | −39 | 18 | Relegation to Tercera Federación |
| 18 | Badalona Futur (R) | 34 | 3 | 8 | 23 | 22 | 65 | −43 | 17 | Relegation to Tercera Federación |

Rules for classification: 1) points; 2) head-to-head points; 3) head-to-head goal difference; 4) goal difference; 5) number of goals scored
(Note: Head-to-head record is used only after all the matches between the teams in question have been played)
(C) Champions; (P) Promoted; (R) Relegated

==== Results ====
| Home \ Away | ALZ | AND | ATB | BFU | COR | ELC | ESP | EUR | IIP | LLE | MAL | OLO | PDE | SAB | SAN | TER | TOR | VAL |
|---|---|---|---|---|---|---|---|---|---|---|---|---|---|---|---|---|---|---|
| Alzira | — | 1–2 | 1–0 | 1–1 | 1–0 | 1–1 | 1–2 | 1–0 | 1–2 | 1–4 | 0–3 | 1–2 | 0–2 | 0–0 | 0–1 | 0–2 | 0–1 | 0–1 |
| Andratx | 2–3 | — | 2–2 | 0–0 | 0–0 | 0–5 | 1–0 | 2–1 | 2–0 | 3–1 | 0–0 | 0–1 | 0–1 | 3–5 | 1–1 | 1–0 | 0–1 | 1–0 |
| Atlético Baleares | 3–0 | 0–1 | — | 1–0 | 1–1 | 1–1 | 1–0 | 3–1 | 2–0 | 1–1 | 3–0 | 2–2 | 3–1 | 1–0 | 1–1 | 2–2 | 2–0 | 0–1 |
| Badalona Futur | 1–1 | 0–2 | 0–2 | — | 2–3 | 0–1 | 1–1 | 0–2 | 0–1 | 0–1 | 1–0 | 2–3 | 2–0 | 1–1 | 1–5 | 0–1 | 1–1 | 0–3 |
| Cornellà | 1–1 | 2–1 | 0–0 | 2–1 | — | 1–1 | 0–1 | 2–3 | 1–1 | 1–1 | 3–2 | 1–2 | 4–2 | 2–2 | 4–1 | 0–1 | 2–1 | 1–1 |
| Elche Ilicitano | 1–0 | 1–1 | 2–3 | 3–1 | 4–3 | — | 0–0 | 0–1 | 0–1 | 0–1 | 3–0 | 1–0 | 2–1 | 2–3 | 1–1 | 0–1 | 2–2 | 2–0 |
| Espanyol B | 4–1 | 1–0 | 0–1 | 3–1 | 0–0 | 2–2 | — | 1–1 | 0–0 | 1–0 | 2–1 | 1–0 | 1–1 | 1–2 | 1–2 | 1–1 | 3–2 | 0–3 |
| Europa | 4–0 | 3–0 | 3–1 | 5–1 | 1–0 | 2–1 | 2–1 | — | 2–1 | 0–3 | 5–0 | 2–0 | 1–1 | 2–1 | 4–6 | 1–0 | 2–1 | 0–0 |
| Ibiza Islas Pitiusas | 3–3 | 0–2 | 0–1 | 3–0 | 0–1 | 1–2 | 1–1 | 2–1 | — | 0–0 | 2–1 | 0–1 | 2–1 | 1–0 | 0–1 | 1–2 | 1–3 | 3–0 |
| Lleida | 0–2 | 3–0 | 2–2 | 1–1 | 1–0 | 0–0 | 0–0 | 0–1 | 2–2 | — | 3–1 | 0–0 | 3–0 | 0–1 | 2–2 | 0–3 | 1–1 | 2–2 |
| Mallorca B | 1–1 | 0–1 | 0–3 | 0–1 | 1–1 | 2–0 | 1–3 | 0–2 | 0–1 | 1–1 | — | 0–1 | 1–0 | 0–2 | 1–3 | 1–3 | 2–3 | 0–0 |
| Olot | 3–3 | 1–0 | 0–2 | 2–2 | 1–0 | 1–0 | 2–2 | 0–1 | 1–1 | 0–0 | 1–1 | — | 2–0 | 0–1 | 1–1 | 5–2 | 0–1 | 0–1 |
| Peña Deportiva | 0–1 | 1–3 | 0–0 | 3–1 | 4–1 | 1–1 | 0–2 | 1–2 | 0–0 | 0–0 | 2–1 | 0–0 | — | 1–1 | 2–2 | 2–0 | 1–1 | 3–0 |
| Sabadell | 4–0 | 1–1 | 3–2 | 5–0 | 1–0 | 3–0 | 2–0 | 1–1 | 1–1 | 1–1 | 4–0 | 1–2 | 1–0 | — | 0–4 | 0–0 | 0–1 | 1–1 |
| Sant Andreu | 0–0 | 3–2 | 1–0 | 3–0 | 4–0 | 1–2 | 1–2 | 1–1 | 0–0 | 0–2 | 0–1 | 3–0 | 0–2 | 2–1 | — | 3–1 | 4–0 | 2–3 |
| Terrassa | 3–0 | 1–2 | 1–1 | 1–0 | 1–0 | 1–1 | 0–0 | 0–1 | 0–2 | 1–1 | 2–0 | 0–0 | 1–0 | 2–0 | 0–1 | — | 2–2 | 1–2 |
| Torrent | 0–1 | 3–1 | 0–1 | 2–0 | 0–1 | 2–0 | 1–2 | 1–1 | 4–2 | 1–0 | 2–0 | 2–1 | 1–1 | 0–0 | 2–1 | 1–0 | — | 0–0 |
| Valencia Mestalla | 4–2 | 0–1 | 0–1 | 2–0 | 3–1 | 0–1 | 2–1 | 2–1 | 1–2 | 1–1 | 2–0 | 1–0 | 2–0 | 0–3 | 2–3 | 1–2 | 0–0 | — |

Legend: Blue = home team win; Yellow = draw; Red = away team win.

=== Group 4 ===
Location of teams in 2024–25 Segunda Federación – Group 4

| Team | Home city | Autonomous Community | Stadium | Capacity |
|---|---|---|---|---|
| Águilas | Águilas | Murcia | El Rubial | 4,000 |
| Almería B | Almería | Andalusia | Anexo al UD Almería Stadium | 500 |
| Atlético Antoniano | Lebrija | Andalusia | Municipal de Lebrija | 3,500 |
| Cádiz Mirandilla | Cádiz | Andalusia | Ramón Blanco Rodríguez | 2,500 |
| Don Benito | Don Benito | Extremadura | Vicente Sanz | 3,500 |
| Estepona | Estepona | Andalusia | Francisco Muñoz Pérez | 3,800 |
| Juventud Torremolinos | Torremolinos | Andalusia | El Pozuelo | 3,000 |
| La Unión Atlético | La Unión | Murcia | Municipal | 3,000 |
| Linares | Linares | Andalusia | Linarejos | 10,000 |
| Linense | La Línea de la Concepción | Andalusia | Municipal de La Línea | 12,000 |
| Minera | Llano del Beal | Murcia | Ángel Cedrán | 2,000 |
| Orihuela | Orihuela | Valencian Community | Los Arcos | 7,000 |
| Recreativo Granada | Granada | Andalusia | Ciudad Deportiva | 2,500 |
| San Fernando | San Fernando | Andalusia | Iberoamericano | 12,000 |
| UCAM Murcia | Murcia | Murcia | La Condomina | 6,000 |
| Villanovense | Villanueva de la Serena | Extremadura | Romero Cuerda | 5,000 |
| Xerez | Jerez de la Frontera | Andalusia | Chapín | 20,523 |
| Xerez Deportivo | Jerez de la Frontera | Andalusia | Chapín | 20,523 |

==== League table ====
| Pos | Team | Pld | W | D | L | GF | GA | GD | Pts | Qualification |
|---|---|---|---|---|---|---|---|---|---|---|
| 1 | Juventud Torremolinos (C, P) | 34 | 19 | 11 | 4 | 53 | 26 | +27 | 68 | Promotion to Primera Federación and qualification to Copa del Rey |
| 2 | La Unión Atlético | 34 | 21 | 4 | 9 | 38 | 19 | +19 | 67 | Qualification for the promotion play-offs and Copa del Rey |
| 3 | UCAM Murcia | 34 | 16 | 12 | 6 | 46 | 22 | +24 | 60 | Qualification for the promotion play-offs and Copa del Rey |
| 4 | Atlético Antoniano | 34 | 17 | 8 | 9 | 41 | 32 | +9 | 59 | Qualification for the promotion play-offs and Copa del Rey |
| 5 | Estepona | 34 | 14 | 13 | 7 | 43 | 26 | +17 | 55 | Qualification for the promotion play-offs and Copa del Rey |
| 6 | Almería B | 34 | 15 | 7 | 12 | 38 | 36 | +2 | 52 (Note: Almería B finished ahead of Xerez on head-to-head points: Almería B 1–0 Xerez, Xerez 0–0 Almería B) | |
| 7 | Xerez | 34 | 15 | 7 | 12 | 34 | 26 | +8 | 52 | |
| 8 | Águilas | 34 | 12 | 14 | 8 | 31 | 26 | +5 | 50 | |
| 9 | Linares | 34 | 13 | 9 | 12 | 36 | 34 | +2 | 48 | |
| 10 | Orihuela | 34 | 11 | 10 | 13 | 28 | 27 | +1 | 43 | |
| 11 | Minera | 34 | 11 | 9 | 14 | 37 | 44 | −7 | 42 | |
| 12 | Xerez Deportivo | 34 | 9 | 13 | 12 | 29 | 38 | −9 | 40 | |
| 13 | Villanovense (R) | 34 | 9 | 11 | 14 | 33 | 39 | −6 | 38 | Qualification for the relegation play-offs |
| 14 | Linense (R) | 34 | 10 | 7 | 17 | 27 | 42 | −15 | 37 | Relegation to Tercera Federación |
| 15 | Cádiz Mirandilla (R) | 34 | 9 | 9 | 16 | 29 | 51 | −22 | 36 | Relegation to Tercera Federación |
| 16 | San Fernando (R) | 34 | 8 | 11 | 15 | 27 | 35 | −8 | 35 | Relegation to Tercera Federación |
| 17 | Recreativo Granada (R) | 34 | 7 | 5 | 22 | 29 | 55 | −26 | 26 (Note: Recreativo Granada finished ahead of Don Benito on head-to-head points: Don Benito 0–1 Recreativo Granada, Recreativo Granada 2–2 Don Benito) | Relegation to Tercera Federación |
| 18 | Don Benito (R) | 34 | 6 | 8 | 20 | 30 | 51 | −21 | 26 | Relegation to Tercera Federación |

Rules for classification: 1) points; 2) head-to-head points; 3) head-to-head goal difference; 4) goal difference; 5) number of goals scored
(Note: Head-to-head record is used only after all the matches between the teams in question have been played)
(C) Champions; (P) Promoted; (R) Relegated

==== Results ====
| Home \ Away | AGU | ALM | ANT | CAD | DBE | EST | JTO | LUA | LNR | LNS | MIN | ORI | RGR | SFE | UCM | VIL | XER | XDE |
|---|---|---|---|---|---|---|---|---|---|---|---|---|---|---|---|---|---|---|
| Águilas | — | 2–2 | 0–2 | 1–0 | 2–1 | 0–0 | 0–2 | 0–0 | 1–0 | 0–0 | 4–1 | 1–1 | 2–0 | 1–1 | 2–1 | 0–1 | 1–0 | 0–0 |
| Almería B | 1–3 | — | 2–0 | 2–1 | 2–1 | 1–2 | 0–2 | 1–2 | 1–2 | 4–1 | 2–1 | 1–0 | 3–1 | 2–1 | 0–1 | 1–0 | 1–0 | 0–1 |
| Atlético Antoniano | 0–0 | 1–1 | — | 1–0 | 1–0 | 2–1 | 3–2 | 1–4 | 1–1 | 0–1 | 3–1 | 2–0 | 1–1 | 0–0 | 2–1 | 0–0 | 1–0 | 2–1 |
| Cádiz Mirandilla | 1–1 | 1–0 | 1–1 | — | 2–1 | 0–4 | 1–1 | 0–1 | 2–1 | 0–1 | 0–2 | 2–1 | 2–0 | 2–9 | 1–1 | 0–1 | 0–2 | 0–2 |
| Don Benito | 2–1 | 1–2 | 1–0 | 3–3 | — | 1–2 | 0–2 | 0–1 | 0–0 | 0–2 | 1–2 | 0–0 | 0–1 | 1–0 | 2–4 | 0–0 | 0–1 | 0–0 |
| Estepona | 3–1 | 0–1 | 1–3 | 5–1 | 1–1 | — | 3–3 | 0–1 | 1–1 | 4–0 | 1–1 | 0–0 | 1–0 | 2–0 | 1–1 | 1–0 | 1–1 | 1–1 |
| Juventud Torremolinos | 1–1 | 3–0 | 2–0 | 1–1 | 3–2 | 1–0 | — | 0–2 | 2–1 | 1–0 | 5–0 | 2–1 | 2–0 | 1–2 | 0–0 | 2–2 | 1–1 | 2–1 |
| La Unión Atlético | 0–1 | 1–0 | 0–1 | 2–0 | 3–1 | 1–1 | 0–0 | — | 1–0 | 0–1 | 2–0 | 1–0 | 1–0 | 1–0 | 1–0 | 2–1 | 0–1 | 2–1 |
| Linares | 2–0 | 1–0 | 2–1 | 2–2 | 2–0 | 1–2 | 0–2 | 1–0 | — | 1–0 | 2–0 | 0–1 | 2–1 | 2–1 | 1–1 | 1–1 | 0–2 | 4–0 |
| Linense | 0–1 | 0–1 | 1–0 | 0–2 | 2–3 | 1–1 | 1–1 | 2–1 | 0–0 | — | 1–2 | 0–1 | 2–1 | 0–2 | 0–2 | 3–1 | 0–2 | 1–1 |
| Minera | 0–0 | 1–3 | 1–2 | 1–1 | 1–0 | 0–1 | 0–1 | 3–1 | 1–0 | 0–0 | — | 1–0 | 2–3 | 2–0 | 0–0 | 1–1 | 1–1 | 3–0 |
| Orihuela | 0–0 | 1–1 | 1–1 | 1–0 | 2–1 | 0–0 | 0–1 | 0–2 | 0–1 | 1–0 | 0–1 | — | 3–0 | 1–1 | 0–1 | 4–1 | 1–0 | 1–0 |
| Recreativo Granada | 1–3 | 1–1 | 0–1 | 3–0 | 2–2 | 0–1 | 0–2 | 2–0 | 0–1 | 0–2 | 0–2 | 1–0 | — | 0–0 | 0–1 | 2–2 | 0–1 | 4–3 |
| San Fernando | 0–0 | 4–1 | 0–1 | 0–1 | 0–1 | 1–0 | 0–1 | 0–0 | 3–3 | 2–1 | 0–0 | 1–0 | 1–3 | — | 1–1 | 3–1 | 1–0 | 0–1 |
| UCAM Murcia | 1–1 | 0–0 | 2–1 | 4–0 | 2–0 | 1–0 | 0–0 | 0–1 | 2–0 | 3–0 | 3–2 | 1–1 | 4–1 | 1–0 | — | 1–1 | 0–1 | 3–0 |
| Villanovense | 1–0 | 0–1 | 1–4 | 4–0 | 2–0 | 0–1 | 0–2 | 0–3 | 2–0 | 1–0 | 1–1 | 1–2 | 4–0 | 2–2 | 0–0 | — | 1–0 | 0–0 |
| Xerez | 1–0 | 0–0 | 1–2 | 1–1 | 2–2 | 0–1 | 3–1 | 0–1 | 2–0 | 1–2 | 3–2 | 0–2 | 1–0 | 2–0 | 2–1 | 1–0 | — | 0–0 |
| Xerez Deportivo | 0–1 | 0–0 | 2–0 | 0–1 | 1–2 | 0–0 | 1–1 | 1–0 | 1–1 | 2–2 | 2–1 | 2–2 | 2–1 | 0–0 | 0–2 | 1–0 | 2–1 | — |

Legend: Blue = home team win; Yellow = draw; Red = away team win.

=== Group 5 ===
Location of teams in 2024–25 Segunda Federación – Group 5
Location of teams of the 2024–25 Segunda Federación – Group 5 (Canary Islands)
Location of teams in 2024–25 Segunda Federación – Group 5 (Community of Madrid)

| Team | Home city | Autonomous Community | Stadium | Capacity |
|---|---|---|---|---|
| Atlético Paso | El Paso | Canary Islands | Municipal El Paso | 5,000 |
| Cacereño | Cáceres | Extremadura | Príncipe Felipe | 7,000 |
| Conquense | Cuenca | Castilla–La Mancha | La Fuensanta | 6,000 |
| Coria | Coria | Extremadura | La Isla | 3,000 |
| Getafe B | Getafe | Madrid | Ciudad Deportiva | 1,500 |
| Guadalajara | Guadalajara | Castilla–La Mancha | Pedro Escartín | 8,000 |
| Illescas | Illescas | Castilla–La Mancha | Municipal | 1,000 |
| Melilla | Melilla | Melilla | Álvarez Claro | 10,000 |
| Moscardó | Madrid | Madrid | Román Valero | 14,000 |
| Móstoles URJC | Móstoles | Madrid | El Soto | 14,000 |
| Navalcarnero | Navalcarnero | Madrid | Mariano González | 2,500 |
| Rayo Majadahonda | Majadahonda | Madrid | Cerro del Espino | 3,800 |
| Real Madrid C | Madrid | Madrid | Ciudad Real Madrid | 3,000 |
| San Sebastián de los Reyes | San Sebastián de los Reyes | Madrid | Matapiñonera | 3,000 |
| Talavera de la Reina | Talavera de la Reina | Castilla–La Mancha | El Prado | 5,000 |
| Tenerife B | Santa Cruz de Tenerife | Canary Islands | Centro Insular | 1,000 |
| Unión Adarve | Madrid | Madrid | Vicente del Bosque | 1,500 |
| Unión Sur Yaiza | Yaiza | Canary Islands | Municipal | 2,000 |

==== League table ====
| Pos | Team | Pld | W | D | L | GF | GA | GD | Pts | Qualification |
|---|---|---|---|---|---|---|---|---|---|---|
| 1 | Guadalajara (C, P) | 34 | 22 | 8 | 4 | 60 | 22 | +38 | 74 | Promotion to Primera Federación and qualification to Copa del Rey |
| 2 | Cacereño (P) | 34 | 19 | 11 | 4 | 57 | 30 | +27 | 68 | Qualification for the promotion play-offs and Copa del Rey |
| 3 | Talavera de la Reina (P) | 34 | 19 | 9 | 6 | 50 | 27 | +23 | 66 | Qualification for the promotion play-offs and Copa del Rey |
| 4 | Rayo Majadahonda | 34 | 15 | 10 | 9 | 41 | 30 | +11 | 55 | Qualification for the promotion play-offs and Copa del Rey |
| 5 | Getafe B | 34 | 15 | 9 | 10 | 48 | 37 | +11 | 54 | Qualification for the promotion play-offs |
| 6 | Navalcarnero | 34 | 15 | 8 | 11 | 43 | 40 | +3 | 53 | Qualification for the Copa del Rey |
| 7 | Coria | 34 | 14 | 8 | 12 | 45 | 49 | −4 | 50 | |
| 8 | San Sebastián de los Reyes | 34 | 13 | 10 | 11 | 45 | 45 | 0 | 49 | |
| 9 | Tenerife B | 34 | 13 | 8 | 13 | 54 | 51 | +3 | 47 | |
| 10 | Conquense | 34 | 13 | 6 | 15 | 37 | 41 | −4 | 45 | |
| 11 | Melilla | 34 | 11 | 11 | 12 | 41 | 42 | −1 | 44 | |
| 12 | Moscardó | 34 | 11 | 9 | 14 | 41 | 56 | −15 | 42 (Note: Moscardó finished ahead of Real Madrid C on head-to-head points: Real Madrid C 0–1 Moscardó, Moscardó 2–1 Real Madrid C) | |
| 13 | Real Madrid C (O) | 34 | 10 | 12 | 12 | 34 | 35 | −1 | 42 | Qualification for the relegation play-offs |
| 14 | Unión Adarve (R) | 34 | 9 | 10 | 15 | 22 | 33 | −11 | 37 | Relegation to Tercera Federación |
| 15 | Móstoles URJC (R) | 34 | 10 | 3 | 21 | 40 | 55 | −15 | 33 | Relegation to Tercera Federación |
| 16 | Illescas (R) | 34 | 8 | 6 | 20 | 30 | 47 | −17 | 30 | Relegation to Tercera Federación |
| 17 | Unión Sur Yaiza (R) | 34 | 6 | 11 | 17 | 34 | 55 | −21 | 29 | Relegation to Tercera Federación |
| 18 | Atlético Paso (R) | 34 | 4 | 9 | 21 | 32 | 59 | −27 | 21 | Relegation to Tercera Federación |

Rules for classification: 1) points; 2) head-to-head points; 3) head-to-head goal difference; 4) goal difference; 5) number of goals scored
(Note: Head-to-head record is used only after all the matches between the teams in question have been played)
(C) Champions; (O) Play-off winners; (P) Promoted; (R) Relegated

==== Results ====
| Home \ Away | ATP | CAC | CON | COR | GET | GUA | ILL | MEL | MSC | MST | NAV | RMJ | RMC | SSR | TAL | TEN | UAD | USY |
|---|---|---|---|---|---|---|---|---|---|---|---|---|---|---|---|---|---|---|
| Atlético Paso | — | 0–1 | 1–0 | 0–0 | 2–2 | 0–1 | 2–1 | 2–3 | 0–1 | 1–3 | 1–1 | 2–3 | 0–0 | 0–0 | 1–2 | 3–2 | 3–2 | 1–1 |
| Cacereño | 2–0 | — | 3–1 | 3–0 | 3–0 | 0–0 | 2–0 | 0–2 | 1–0 | 3–0 | 3–1 | 1–0 | 2–2 | 2–3 | 1–1 | 3–1 | 1–0 | 2–2 |
| Conquense | 3–0 | 1–4 | — | 0–1 | 3–0 | 0–2 | 1–0 | 1–0 | 2–1 | 1–0 | 1–0 | 2–3 | 1–1 | 0–2 | 1–0 | 1–1 | 1–1 | 4–1 |
| Coria | 2–1 | 1–1 | 1–0 | — | 2–0 | 0–3 | 4–3 | 2–2 | 2–0 | 3–0 | 1–2 | 1–4 | 1–0 | 2–2 | 1–1 | 1–3 | 1–0 | 1–0 |
| Getafe B | 1–0 | 0–0 | 4–1 | 1–0 | — | 2–2 | 2–1 | 2–0 | 1–1 | 4–0 | 0–1 | 1–1 | 3–0 | 0–0 | 1–2 | 2–0 | 2–0 | 3–1 |
| Guadalajara | 2–0 | 1–0 | 2–0 | 2–0 | 2–1 | — | 1–0 | 2–0 | 2–3 | 3–0 | 2–0 | 3–0 | 2–0 | 6–0 | 2–0 | 3–1 | 0–0 | 1–0 |
| Illescas | 2–1 | 1–1 | 0–2 | 2–1 | 1–0 | 1–2 | — | 1–3 | 0–1 | 0–3 | 0–1 | 0–2 | 0–1 | 2–1 | 0–1 | 3–1 | 2–1 | 2–1 |
| Melilla | 2–2 | 0–0 | 1–0 | 1–2 | 1–1 | 1–0 | 1–0 | — | 3–1 | 3–2 | 1–0 | 0–0 | 1–2 | 1–1 | 2–2 | 3–1 | 0–0 | 1–2 |
| Moscardó | 4–3 | 1–2 | 0–2 | 2–1 | 3–2 | 1–3 | 1–0 | 4–4 | — | 0–2 | 0–3 | 1–4 | 2–1 | 1–1 | 0–1 | 0–4 | 2–0 | 1–1 |
| Móstoles URJC | 4–1 | 1–2 | 0–1 | 1–3 | 2–0 | 4–2 | 0–1 | 0–1 | 3–1 | — | 0–0 | 0–1 | 1–1 | 1–1 | 2–3 | 0–1 | 1–0 | 3–2 |
| Navalcarnero | 1–0 | 1–1 | 2–0 | 0–2 | 3–2 | 2–1 | 1–1 | 2–2 | 3–3 | 4–2 | — | 0–0 | 2–1 | 2–0 | 1–4 | 0–2 | 3–0 | 2–1 |
| Rayo Majadahonda | 1–1 | 0–2 | 2–1 | 3–0 | 1–2 | 0–0 | 0–0 | 0–0 | 1–2 | 0–1 | 2–1 | — | 2–1 | 2–1 | 0–1 | 2–0 | 0–0 | 0–0 |
| Real Madrid C | 1–1 | 1–2 | 0–1 | 3–3 | 0–0 | 1–1 | 2–1 | 2–1 | 0–1 | 3–1 | 0–0 | 0–1 | — | 1–0 | 0–0 | 2–1 | 1–0 | 4–1 |
| San Sebastián de los Reyes | 2–1 | 1–3 | 2–2 | 1–1 | 1–2 | 1–2 | 2–2 | 2–0 | 1–1 | 1–0 | 2–0 | 2–0 | 1–0 | — | 3–1 | 2–0 | 1–2 | 5–2 |
| Talavera de la Reina | 4–0 | 2–2 | 1–0 | 2–1 | 0–1 | 0–0 | 1–1 | 1–0 | 1–0 | 1–0 | 2–0 | 0–1 | 0–0 | 4–0 | — | 4–3 | 2–0 | 0–0 |
| Tenerife B | 3–2 | 4–1 | 2–0 | 1–1 | 1–3 | 2–2 | 2–1 | 3–1 | 1–1 | 2–1 | 1–2 | 2–4 | 1–1 | 2–0 | 2–0 | — | 2–0 | 2–2 |
| Unión Adarve | 1–0 | 0–0 | 0–0 | 3–1 | 2–2 | 0–1 | 0–0 | 1–0 | 1–1 | 2–1 | 1–2 | 1–0 | 1–0 | 0–1 | 1–2 | 0–0 | — | 1–0 |
| Unión Sur Yaiza | 1–0 | 2–3 | 3–3 | 1–2 | 0–1 | 2–2 | 2–1 | 1–0 | 0–0 | 3–0 | 1–0 | 1–1 | 0–2 | 0–2 | 0–4 | 0–0 | 0–1 | — |

Legend: Blue = home team win; Yellow = draw; Red = away team win.

=== Ranking of 13th-place teams ===
| Pos | Grp | Team | Pld | W | D | L | GF | GA | GD | Pts | Qualification or relegation |
|---|---|---|---|---|---|---|---|---|---|---|---|
| 1 | 3 | Lleida | 34 | 9 | 18 | 7 | 38 | 30 | +8 | 45 | |
| 2 | 1 | Escobedo | 34 | 10 | 13 | 11 | 31 | 39 | −8 | 43 | Qualification for the relegation play-offs |
| 3 | 5 | Real Madrid C | 34 | 10 | 12 | 12 | 34 | 35 | −1 | 42 | Qualification for the relegation play-offs |
| 4 | 2 | Barbastro | 34 | 11 | 7 | 16 | 36 | 40 | −4 | 40 | Qualification for the relegation play-offs |
| 5 | 4 | Villanovense | 34 | 9 | 11 | 14 | 33 | 39 | −6 | 38 | Qualification for the relegation play-offs |

Updated to match(es) played on 4 May 2025. Source:
Rules for classification: 1) points; 2) goal difference; 3) number of goals scored

== See also ==
- 2024–25 La Liga
- 2024–25 Segunda División
- 2024–25 Primera Federación
- 2024–25 Tercera Federación
