= Sergio Navarro =

Sergio Navarro may refer to:

- Sergio Navarro (footballer, born 1936), Chilean former footballer
- Sergio Navarro (footballer, born 1979), Spanish football manager
- Sergio Navarro (footballer, born 2001), Spanish footballer
