= Pajuelo =

Pajuelo is a Spanish surname. Notable people with the surname include:

- Ángel Pajuelo (born 1987), Spanish footballer
- Juan Pajuelo (born 1974), Peruvian footballer and manager
