= Julio Moreno =

Julio Moreno may refer to:

- Julio Enrique Moreno (1879–1952), President of Ecuador
- Julio Moreno (baseball) (1921–1987), Cuban-born right-handed pitcher
- Julio Moreno (fencer) (1903–?), Chilean Olympic fencer
- Julio Moreno (racing driver) (born 1995), Ecuadorian racing driver
- Julio César Moreno (born 1969), football coach
- Julio Alberto Moreno (born 1958), Spanish retired footballer
- Julio Cobos Moreno (born 1971), Spanish retired footballer
