= José Antonio Espín =

Spanish footballer

Personal information
- Full name: José Antonio Espín Puerta
- Date of birth: 9 February 1985 (age 41)
- Place of birth: Murcia, Spain
- Height: 1.84 m (6 ft 0 in)
- Position: Centre-back

Team information
- Current team: Atlético Porcuna

Youth career
- Valladolid

Senior career*
Years	Team	Apps	(Gls)
2003–2004	Pinatar		
2004–2005	Orihuela		
2005–2007	Ciudad Murcia B		
2007	Ciudad Murcia	3	(0)
2007–2011	Jaén	99	(7)
2011–2012	Eibar	53	(4)
2012–2014	Guadalajara	51	(2)
2014	AEL	0	(0)
2015	Mirandés	5	(0)
2015	Huracán	13	(0)
2016–2019	Villanovense	84	(2)
2019–2021	Ebro	50	(3)
2021–2022	Villanovense	15	(0)
2022–2025	Jaén	104	(6)
2025–	Atlético Porcuna	3	(0)
- * Club domestic league appearances and goals as of 21 September 2025

José Antonio Espín Puerta (born 9 February 1985) is a Spanish professional footballer who plays for Tercera Federación club Atlético Porcuna as a centre-back.

== Club career ==
Born in Murcia, Espín finished his youth career at Real Valladolid's youth system, and made his senior debuts with Pinatar CF in the fourth division. In the same tier, he also played for Orihuela CF and Ciudad de Murcia's reserves.

On 26 May 2007, Espín made his second level debut with the latter's first team, playing three minutes against CD Numancia. He finished the season with a further two league appearances, totalling just 147 minutes of action.

In the summer of 2007, Espín joined division three side Real Jaén. Two years later, he renewed his contract with the Andalusians for another two years.

On the last day of 2011 winter transfer window, Espín signed a six-month deal with SD Eibar also in the third division. On 9 July 2012 he returned to the level above, after agreeing to a one-year contract with CD Guadalajara.

On 14 June 2014, aged 28, Espín moved abroad for the first time in his career, joining Football League (Greece) club Athlitiki Enosi Larissa FC. On 24 December, however, he returned to his homeland, signing with second level's CD Mirandés.
