= Mike Cevallos =

Ecuadorian footballer (born 2001)

Personal information
- Full name: Mike Alexander Cevallos Yaguachi
- Date of birth: 22 June 2001 (age 25)
- Place of birth: Guayaquil, Ecuador
- Height: 1.78 m (5 ft 10 in)
- Position: Forward

Team information
- Current team: La Unión Atlético
- Number: 19

Youth career
- 2013–2015: Dénia
- 2015–2016: Benidorm
- 2016–2019: Málaga

Senior career*
Years	Team	Apps	(Gls)
2019–2021	Málaga B	21	(3)
2021–2022	Sant Rafel	36	(14)
2022	Ibiza	1	(0)
2022–2023	Grama	28	(6)
2023–2024	Beroe	17	(2)
2024	→ El Palo (loan)	16	(3)
2024–2025	Antoniano	31	(8)
2025–	La Unión Atlético	24	(1)

International career
2020	Ecuador U20		
- * Club domestic league appearances and goals as of 15 May 2026

Mike Alexander Cevallos Yaguachi (born 22 June 2001) is an Ecuadorian professional footballer who plays as a forward for Spanish Segunda Federación club La Unión Atlético. He also holds Spanish citizenship.

== Club career ==
Born in Guayaquil, Cevallos moved to Valencia, Spain at the age of six. He represented CD Dénia and Benidorm CF before joining Málaga CF's youth setup in 2016.

After progressing through the youth categories, Cevallos made his senior debut with the reserves on 29 September 2019, coming on as a late substitute and scoring the equalizer in a 2–2 Tercera División home draw against Antequera CF. He was unable to become a regular starter at the B-side, leaving the club in July 2021 and subsequently moved to UD Ibiza's reserves CF Sant Rafel late in the month.

Cevallos was Sant Rafel's top scorer with 14 goals, but was unable to prevent the side's relegation from Tercera División RFEF. He made his professional debut with Ibiza on 15 May 2022, replacing Miguel Ángel Guerrero in a 0–4 Segunda División away loss against CD Mirandés. In July 2023, Cevallos signed a contract with Bulgarian team Beroe.

== International career ==
Cevallos was called up by Ecuador at under-20 level in September 2020.
