= Julio Cobos (footballer) =

Spanish retired footballer

Personal information
- Full name: Julio Cobos Moreno
- Date of birth: 10 February 1971 (age 55)
- Place of birth: Santa Amalia, Spain
- Height: 1.69 m (5 ft 6 1/2 in)
- Position: Winger

Team information
- Current team: Cacereño (manager)

Youth career
- Badajoz

Senior career*
Years	Team	Apps	(Gls)
1989–1992	Badajoz	46	(2)
1992–1995	Sevilla B	118	(13)
1995–1996	Talavera	37	(7)
1996–2000	Xerez	114	(9)
2000–2004	Cacereño	113	(34)
2004–2007	Extremadura	90	(9)
2007–2010	Don Benito		
2010–2011	Santa Amalia		

Managerial career
- 2011–2012: Cacereño (assistant)
- 2012–2013: Cacereño
- 2013–2016: Villanovense
- 2016–2018: Linense
- 2018–2019: Villanovense
- 2019–: Cacereño
- * Club domestic league appearances and goals

Julio Cobos Moreno (born 10 February 1971) is a Spanish retired footballer who played as a winger, and is the current manager of CP Cacereño.

== Club career ==
Born in Santa Amalia, Badajoz, Extremadura, Cobos played amateur football well into his 20s. In the 1996 summer he joined Xerez CD in Segunda División B, achieving promotion in his first season.

On 5 October 1997 Cobos played his first professional match, starting in a 3–0 home win against CD Leganés in the Segunda División. He scored his first goal ten days later, in a 4–1 home routing over Levante UD.

In the 2000 summer Cobos moved to Tercera División club CP Cacereño, achieving promotion in the 2001–02 season. He later resumed his career in the lower levels, representing CF Extremadura, CD Don Benito and CD Santa Amalia, retiring with the latter in 2011, aged 40.

== Managerial career ==
Shortly after retiring, Cobos returned to his former club Cacereño, acting as Pedro Braojos' assistant manager. On 14 July 2012 he was appointed manager, as the latter was sacked.

On 12 June 2013 Cobos was named CF Villanovense manager. He took the club back to the third level at first attempt, finishing first in their group. In June, 2019 he was appointed the head coach of CP Cacereño, playing in Tercera División.

== Managerial statistics ==
As of 24 October 2026

Managerial record by team and tenure
Team	From	To	Record								Ref
Team	From	To	G	W	D	L	GF	GA	GD	Win %	Ref
Cacereño	14 July 2012	12 June 2013	42	14	15	13	50	42	+8	33.33	
Villanovense	12 June 2013	20 March 2016	118	59	32	27	177	111	+66	50.00	
Linense	6 December 2016	23 April 2018	56	18	22	16	62	56	+6	32.14	
Villanovense	9 October 2018	11 June 2019	34	8	15	11	31	33	−2	23.53	
Cacereño	11 June 2019	Present	259	123	75	61	371	240	+131	47.49	
Total			509	222	159	128	691	482	+209	43.61	—
