= Moisés Rodríguez =

Spanish footballer

Moi
Personal information
- Full name: Moisés Rodríguez Laínez
- Date of birth: 2 April 1997 (age 29)
- Place of birth: Los Palacios, Spain
- Height: 1.84 m (6 ft 0 in)
- Position: Centre-back

Team information
- Current team: Xerez
- Number: 19

Youth career
- La Liara
- 2016: Cádiz

Senior career*
Years	Team	Apps	(Gls)
2015–2016	La Liara	12	(0)
2016–2020	Cádiz B	107	(3)
2020	Cádiz	1	(0)
2020–2021	Utrera	25	(2)
2021–2022	Villanovense	33	(3)
2022–2024	Melilla	68	(5)
2024–2025	Ourense CF	27	(0)
2025–	Xerez	3	(1)
- * Club domestic league appearances and goals as of 28 September 2025

Moisés Rodríguez Laínez (born 2 April 1997), commonly known as just Moi, is a Spanish footballer who plays for Segunda Federación club Xerez as a centre-back.

== Club career ==
Born in Los Palacios y Villafranca, Seville, Andalusia, Moi joined Cádiz CF midway through the 2015–16 season, after already having made his senior debut with La Liara Balompié in the regional leagues. In 2016, after finishing his formation, he was promoted to the reserves also in the lower leagues.

Moi subsequently became a regular starter for the Amarillos, helping the B's with two promotions in 2017 and 2019. On 5 August 2019, he renewed his contract with the club until 2021.

Moi made his first team debut on 20 July 2020, coming on as a first-half substitute for the injured Marc Baró in a 0–1 home loss against Albacete Balompié in the Segunda División.
