= Adrián Lois =

Spanish footballer

Personal information
- Full name: Adrián Lois Sixto
- Date of birth: 12 February 1989 (age 37)
- Place of birth: Valencia, Spain
- Height: 1.76 m (5 ft 9 1/2 in)
- Position: Midfielder

Team information
- Current team: Torrent
- Number: 22

Youth career
- 2004–2008: Levante

Senior career*
Years	Team	Apps	(Gls)
2008–2012	Levante B	119	(6)
2010–2011	Levante	2	(0)
2012–2014	Castellón	73	(4)
2014–2015	Acero	36	(0)
2015–2018	Saguntino	100	(7)
2018–2019	Atzeneta	31	(1)
2019–2021	Saguntino	51	(2)
2021–	Torrent	149	(6)
- * Club domestic league appearances and goals as of 15 May 2026

Adrián Lois Sixto (born 12 February 1989) is a Spanish footballer who plays for Torrent as a midfielder.

== Football career ==
Born in Valencia, Lois played youth football for local Levante UD, making his senior debuts with the reserves in the 2007–08 season, in Segunda División B. On 19 June 2010, with the main squad already promoted to La Liga, he made his official debut, coming on as a second-half substitute in a 0–4 away defeat against Real Betis in the Segunda División championship.

On 6 January 2011 Lois made his second appearance with the Granotas, in a 2–0 home win over Real Madrid for the campaign's Copa del Rey. His first game in the top flight occurred on 19 February, playing the last 11 minutes in a 0–2 away defeat to the same team.

In the 2012 summer Lois left Levante and signed with neighbouring CD Castellón, in Tercera División. On 19 February 2013 he was expected to join China League One club Hubei China-Kyle, but the deal fell through days later, and he signed a new two-year contract in July.
