= Álvaro Clausí =

Spanish footballer

Personal information
- Full name: Álvaro Clausí Marín
- Date of birth: 7 April 1993 (age 33)
- Place of birth: Alicante, Spain
- Height: 1.77 m (5 ft 10 in)
- Position: Attacking midfielder

Youth career
- 2001–2011: Alicante
- 2011–2012: Hércules

Senior career*
Years	Team	Apps	(Gls)
2010	Alicante B	2	(0)
2012–2013	Hércules B	29	(1)
2012–2014	Hércules	4	(0)
2013–2014	→ Alcoyano (loan)	16	(1)
2014–2016	Mallorca B	41	(1)
2016–2017	Sabadell	22	(2)
2017–2018	Eldense	36	(1)
2018–2019	Ontinyent	4	(0)
2019	Rápido Bouzas	16	(1)
2019–2022	Villanovense	73	(7)
2022–2025	Cacereño	81	(9)
- * Club domestic league appearances and goals

Álvaro Clausí Marín (born 7 April 1993) is a Spanish former footballer who played as an attacking midfielder.

== Club career ==
Born in Alicante, Clausí was formed as a player in local Alicante CF, making his senior debuts still as a junior with the reserve side. In 2011, he joined Valencian Community neighbours Hércules CF to complete his grooming.

Clausí played his first game as a professional on the first day of the 2012–13 season, coming on as a 71st-minute substitute for Fran Mérida in a 0–1 away loss against CD Lugo in the Segunda División. On 23 July 2013, he was loaned to Segunda División B club CD Alcoyano.

On 27 July 2014, Clausí signed for RCD Mallorca B, also in the third division. On 19 August 2016, he moved to fellow league team CE Sabadell FC.
