= Estadio Román Suárez Puerta =

Multi-use stadium in Spain

Román Suárez Puerta
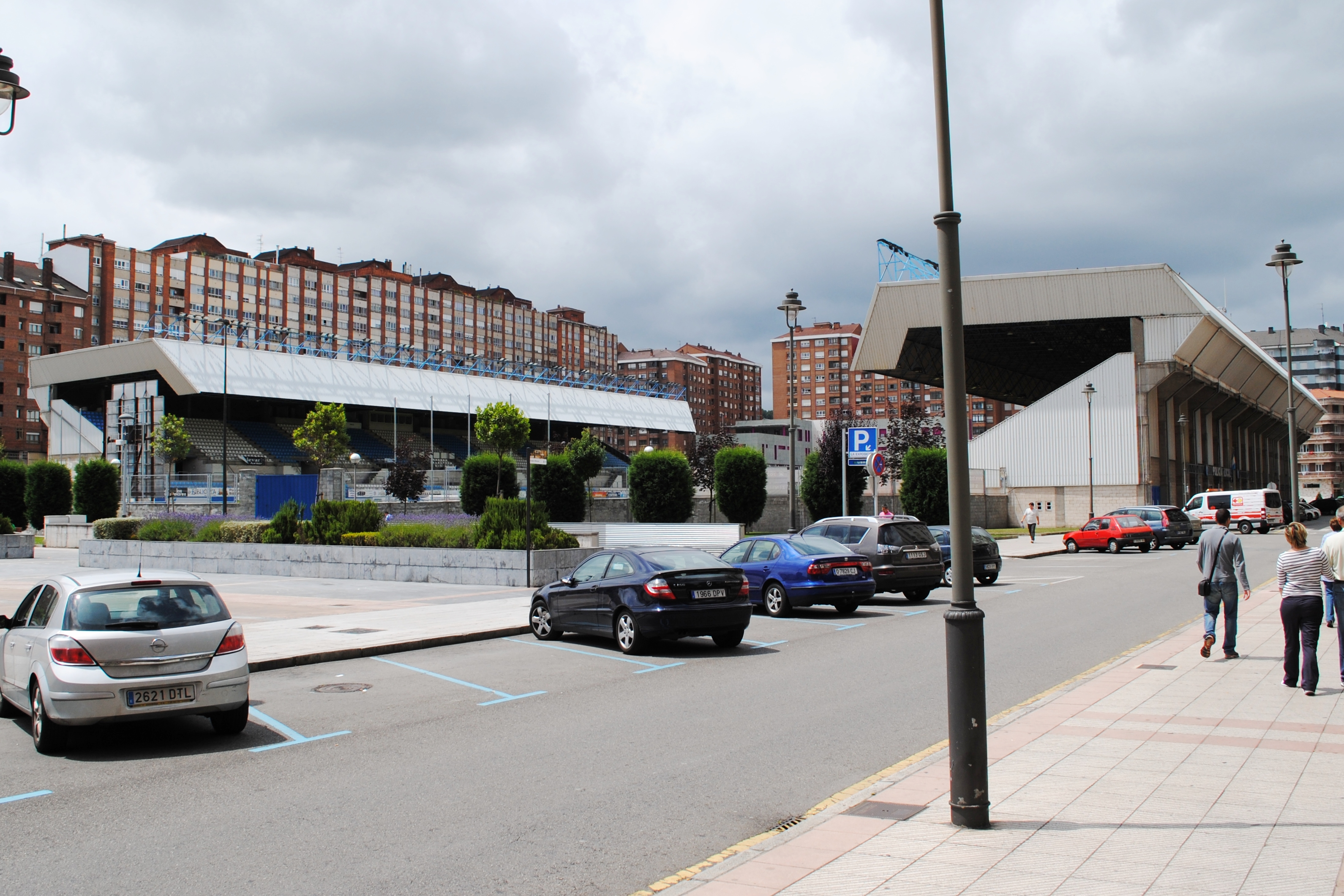
- Interactive map of Román Suárez Puerta
- Full name: Estadio Román Suárez Puerta
- Former names: Estadio La Exposición (1943–1956)
- Location: Avilés, Spain
- Coordinates: 43.5575°N 5.9306°W
- Capacity: 5,352
- Surface: Grass
- Record attendance: 8,500; Avilés Industrial vs Rayo Majadahonda (31 June 2025)
- Field size: 105 m × 65 m (344 ft × 213 ft)

Construction
- Opened: September 26, 1943; 83 years ago
- Renovated: 1999
- Architect: Juan Corominas

Tenant
- Real Avilés Industrial

The Estadio Román Suárez Puerta is a multi-use stadium located in Avilés, Asturias, Spain. It is currently used for football matches and is the home stadium of Real Avilés.

The stadium has a capacity of 5,352 seats: 4,220 of them are in the two main tribunes and 1,232 in the uncovered stand.

== History ==
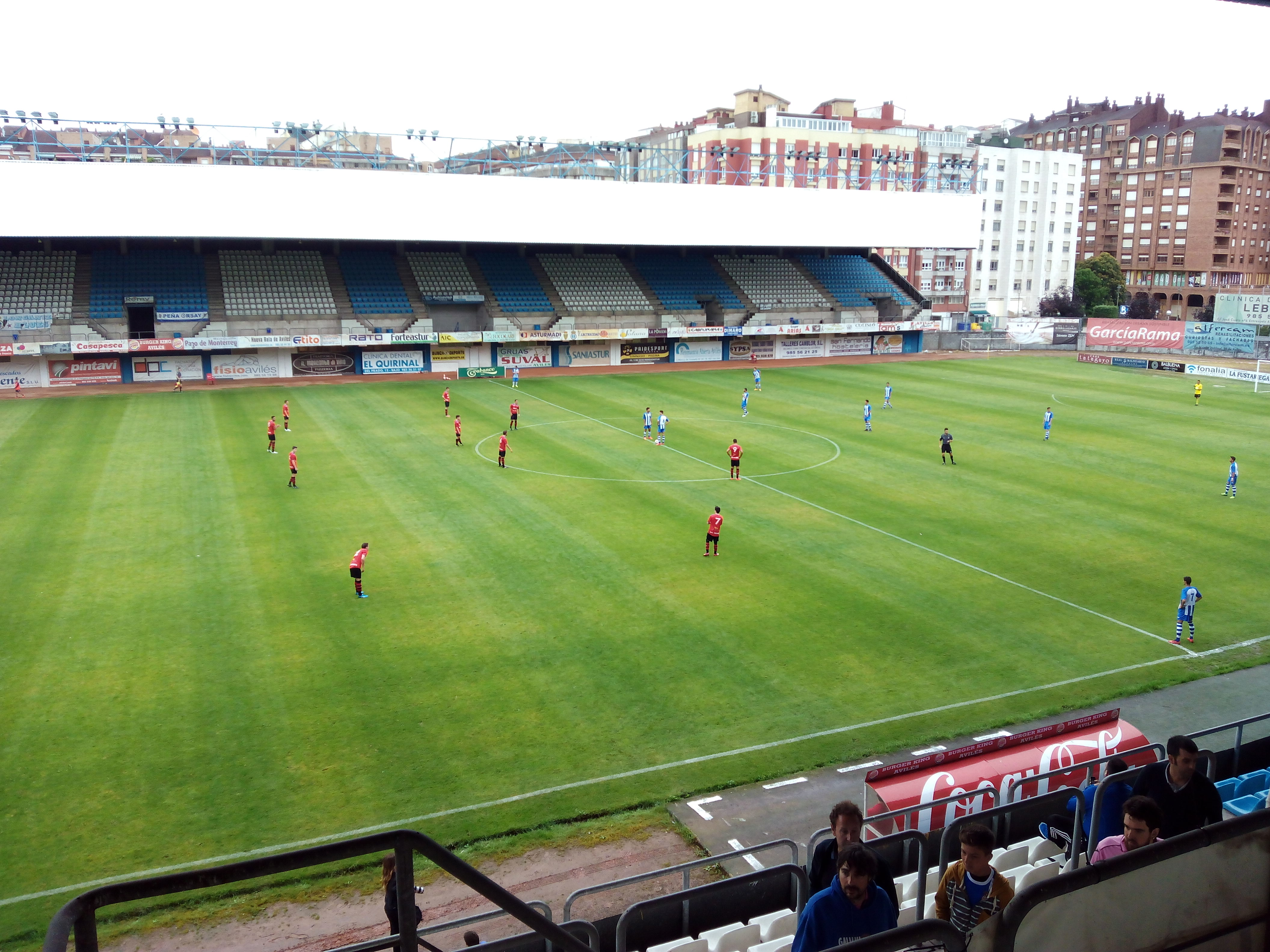
Estadio Román Suárez Puerta

Inaugurated with the name of Estadio La Exposición on 26 September 1943 with a match between Real Avilés and Real Santander, the stadium changed its name in homage of the mayor of Avilés who proposed its construction in 1956.

The stadium also hosted the Spanish Championship of Athletics between 1948 and 1952 and has been totally renovated in 1999.

On 28 December 2002, Estadio Román Suárez Puerta hosted the 5–2 win of the Asturian football team against Honduras, in front of a crowd of 7,000 people.

=== International matches ===
Five international matches have been played at the stadium. The first was an official match, part of the Military World Cup, between the national teams of Turkey and Belgium. It was held on 8 July 1965.

The second match involving an international team took place on 10 June 1982, as a training game between the Algeria national football team and a squad from Real Oviedo. The third was an international U-16 friendly between Spain and Denmark, held on 23 February 1999.

The fourth was also a friendly, this time between the senior teams of Asturias and Honduras, with Asturias winning 5–3. The fifth was played on 29 June 2023, when the Spain women's national team faced Panama in a friendly as preparation for the upcoming 2023 FIFA Women's World Cup in Australia and New Zealand — a tournament that Spain went on to win.

=== Cycling ===
The stadium also served as the finish line for stages of the Vuelta a España in the 1964 and 1981 editions. On 12 May 1964, the winner was English cyclist Barry Hoban, while on 22 April 1981, Italian cyclist Guido Bontempi won the sprint. Both stage finishes were located on the athletics track.

=== Other events ===
The stadium has served throughout its long history as the venue for various musical concerts, political rallies (including one by La Pasionaria), and even dog show championships. It has also hosted a variety of sporting events, such as equestrian competitions, archery, boxing, and gymnastics exhibitions, among others.

== League attendances ==
This is a list of league and playoffs games attendances of Real Avilés Industrial at Estadio Román Suárez Puerta.

Season	Total	High	Low	Average
2021–22 2ª Fed.	13,317	1,288	581	783
2022–23 2ª Fed.	40,591	6,700	783	2,136
2024–25 2ª Fed.	38,791	4,400	1,396	2,155
2024–25 2ª Fed.	47,824	8,500	1,310	2,517
2025–26 1ª Fed.	69,536	4,293	2,876	3,660
