= Torrent CF =

Torrent
- Full name: Torrent Club de Fútbol
- Nickname: Naranjos (Oranges)
- Founded: 1922; 104 years ago
- Stadium: San Gregorio
- Capacity: 3,000
- President: Víctor Ventosa
- Head coach: Bernabé Ballester
- League: Tercera Federación – Group 6
- 2025–26: Segunda Federación – Group 3, 17th of 18 (relegated)
- Website: torrentclubdefutbol.com
| Home colours | Away colours |

Torrent Club de Fútbol is a Spanish football team based in Torrent, in the Valencian Community. Founded in 1922, the club is the oldest football team in the Horta Sud region and one of the oldest in the Valencian Community. It plays in Tercera Federación – Group 6, holding home matches at Estadio San Gregorio.

== History ==
Under the guidance of Fray Carmelo María of Paiporta, organizational work over a two-year period contributed to the formation of a football club in the town. In July 1922, reflecting the growing popularity of football in the provincial capital and with the involvement of several members of the Antonian community, Torrente Foot-ball Club was established. Enrique Mondragón Pons was appointed as the first president.

The team adopted orange shirts and white shorts as its colors and initially played at the Camp de les Figueres del Caxet. The club was officially registered with the Civil Government on 10 March 1923 and inaugurated its new ground, Campo del Cuartel, on 2 April of the same year with a 1–3 defeat in a friendly match against the reserve team of Valencia F.C. It was subsequently affiliated with the Levantine Regional Football Federation and placed in the Primera B division, the second regional tier at the time.

In 1923, other clubs were founded in the town, including Tigris F.C. and Sporting Club de Torrente. In early 1924, political disagreements within Torrente F.C. led to a split, resulting in the creation of Club Deportivo Torrente, with José Roselló Gordó as president. The new club was officially registered on 30 June 1924.

Following the departure of Murcian clubs from the federation, both Torrente F.C. and C.D. Torrente — which adopted white shirts and black shorts — were classified in the Primera B division by the now-renamed Valencian Football Federation. In the years that followed, the two clubs developed a local rivalry, marked by intense matches and division among supporters. Although a reconciliation and proposed merger were agreed upon in February 1927, the fusion was never completed, and both clubs continued to operate independently.

On 11 September 1927, Torrente F.C. inaugurated a new stadium, Camp de la Garrofera, with a 1–1 draw against Valencia F.C. Around the same period, additional clubs were founded in the town, including Castillo F.C. in 1924 and C.D. Antoniano on 17 February 1926, which had its own pitch located near the town cemetery.

Torrent CF first reached Tercera División in 1943, being relegated that same season, entering a four-year inactivity period. Upon returning to regional football, Torrent stayed there until 1963, when it returned to Tercera División. After five seasons the club suffered relegation, and remained in the regional leagues until 1982.

In 1990, it first reached Segunda División B, but returned to the fourth division after two campaigns. In 1993, after suffering another relegation, the club folded.

A new club, named Torrent UE, was founded immediately after Torrent CF's dissolution and played for four full seasons before dissolving. In the 90s, Torrent EF was founded and became Torrent CF's historical heir. In 2006, the club regained the old name Torrent CF.

== Season to season ==
=== Torrente CF/Torrent CF (1922–1993) ===
| Season | Tier | Division | Place | Copa del Rey |
|---|---|---|---|---|
| 1940–41 | 5 | 2ª Reg. | | |
| 1941–42 | 4 | 2ª Reg. | | |
| 1942–43 | 3 | 1ª Reg. | 4th | |
| 1943–44 | 3 | 3ª | 8th | |
| 1944–1948 | DNP | | | |
| 1948–49 | 5 | 2ª Reg. | 4th | |
| 1949–50 | 5 | 2ª Reg. | | |
| 1950–51 | 5 | 2ª Reg. | 1st | |
| 1951–52 | 4 | 1ª Reg. | 12th | |
| 1952–53 | 4 | 1ª Reg. | 5th | |
| 1953–54 | 4 | 1ª Reg. | 9th | |
| 1954–55 | 4 | 1ª Reg. | 8th | |
| 1955–56 | DNP | | | |
| 1956–57 | DNP | | | |
| 1957–58 | 5 | 2ª Reg. | 11th | |
| 1958–59 | DNP | | | |
| 1959–60 | 5 | 2ª Reg. | 9th | |
| 1960–61 | 5 | 2ª Reg. | | |
| 1961–62 | 4 | 1ª Reg. | 5th | |
| 1962–63 | 4 | 1ª Reg. | 5th | |

| Season | Tier | Division | Place | Copa del Rey |
|---|---|---|---|---|
| 1963–64 | 4 | 1ª Reg. | 5th | |
| 1964–65 | 4 | 1ª Reg. | 1st | |
| 1965–66 | 3 | 3ª | 14th | |
| 1966–67 | 3 | 3ª | 7th | |
| 1967–68 | 3 | 3ª | 10th | |
| 1968–69 | 3 | 3ª | 7th | |
| 1969–70 | 3 | 3ª | 16th | First round |
| 1970–71 | 4 | Reg. Pref. | 16th | |
| 1971–72 | 4 | Reg. Pref. | 3rd | |
| 1972–73 | 4 | Reg. Pref. | 5th | |
| 1973–74 | 4 | Reg. Pref. | 10th | |
| 1974–75 | 4 | Reg. Pref. | 18th | |
| 1975–76 | 5 | 1ª Reg. | 12th | |
| 1976–77 | 4 | Reg. Pref. | 7th | |
| 1977–78 | 5 | Reg. Pref. | 11th | |
| 1978–79 | 6 | 1ª Reg. | 8th | |
| 1979–80 | 6 | 1ª Reg. | 13th | |
| 1980–81 | 6 | 1ª Reg. | 1st | |
| 1981–82 | 5 | Reg. Pref. | 2nd | |
| 1982–83 | 4 | 3ª | 11th | |

| Season | Tier | Division | Place | Copa del Rey |
|---|---|---|---|---|
| 1983–84 | 4 | 3ª | 12th | |
| 1984–85 | 4 | 3ª | 18th | |
| 1985–86 | 5 | Reg. Pref. | 16th | |
| 1986–87 | 5 | Reg. Pref. | 1st | |
| 1987–88 | 4 | 3ª | 2nd | |
| 1988–89 | 4 | 3ª | 7th | |
| 1989–90 | 4 | 3ª | 1st | |
| 1990–91 | 3 | 2ª B | 14th | Third round |
| 1991–92 | 3 | 2ª B | 19th | Second round |
| 1992–93 | 4 | 3ª | 18th | First round |

=== Torrent UE (1993–1997) ===
| Season | Tier | Division | Place | Copa del Rey |
|---|---|---|---|---|
| 1993–94 | 7 | 2ª Reg. | 1st | |
| 1994–95 | 6 | 1ª Reg. | 7th | |
| 1995–96 | 6 | 1ª Reg. | 1st | |
| 1996–97 | 5 | Reg. Pref. | 8th | |

=== Torrent CF (1998) ===
| Season | Tier | Division | Place | Copa del Rey |
|---|---|---|---|---|
| 1998–99 | 7 | 2ª Reg. | 2nd | |
| 1999–2000 | 6 | 1ª Reg. | 7th | |
| 2000–01 | 6 | 1ª Reg. | 13th | |
| 2001–02 | 5 | Reg. Pref. | 15th | |
| 2002–03 | 5 | Reg. Pref. | 9th | |
| 2003–04 | 5 | Reg. Pref. | 6th | |
| 2004–05 | 5 | Reg. Pref. | 10th | |
| 2005–06 | 5 | Reg. Pref. | 13th | |
| 2006–07 | 5 | Reg. Pref. | 9th | |
| 2007–08 | 5 | Reg. Pref. | 10th | |
| 2008–09 | 5 | Reg. Pref. | 9th | |
| 2009–10 | 5 | Reg. Pref. | 15th | |
| 2010–11 | 5 | Reg. Pref. | 8th | |
| 2011–12 | 5 | Reg. Pref. | 16th | |
| 2012–13 | 6 | 1ª Reg. | 2nd | |
| 2013–14 | 5 | Reg. Pref. | 2nd | |
| 2014–15 | 5 | Reg. Pref. | 4th | |
| 2015–16 | 5 | Reg. Pref. | 1st | |
| 2016–17 | 5 | Reg. Pref. | 6th | |
| 2017–18 | 5 | Reg. Pref. | 3rd | |

| Season | Tier | Division | Place | Copa del Rey |
|---|---|---|---|---|
| 2018–19 | 5 | Reg. Pref. | 4th | |
| 2019–20 | 5 | Reg. Pref. | 2nd | |
| 2020–21 | 4 | 3ª | 8th / 4th | |
| 2021–22 | 5 | 3ª RFEF | 5th | |
| 2022–23 | 5 | 3ª Fed. | 3rd | |
| 2023–24 | 4 | 2ª Fed. | 7th | |
| 2024–25 | 4 | 2ª Fed. | 5th | |
| 2025–26 | 4 | 2ª Fed. | 17th | Second round |
| 2026–27 | 5 | 3ª Fed. | | |

- 2 seasons in Segunda División B
- 3 seasons in Segunda Federación
- 14 seasons in Tercera División
- 3 seasons in Tercera Federación/Tercera División RFEF

== Current squad ==
As of 10 February 2026

Note: Flags indicate national team as defined under FIFA eligibility rules; some limited exceptions apply. Players may hold more than one non-FIFA nationality.

| No. | Pos. | Nation | Player |
|---|---|---|---|
| 1 | GK | ESP | Raúl Bernabeu |
| 2 | DF | ESP | Miguel Llambrich |
| 3 | DF | ESP | Iván Martínez |
| 4 | DF | MDA | Dan Ojog |
| 6 | MF | ESP | Armando Corbalán |
| 7 | FW | ESP | Vicente Meca |
| 9 | FW | ESP | Raúl Caballero |
| 10 | MF | KOR | Hyeon-jun Park |
| 12 | DF | HAI | Sébastien Lauture |
| 13 | GK | ESP | Mark Dolz |
| 15 | DF | ESP | Monty |
| 16 | DF | ARG | Steven Sibille |

| No. | Pos. | Nation | Player |
|---|---|---|---|
| 17 | DF | ESP | Héctor Mejía |
| 18 | DF | USA | Domenic Bellissimo |
| 19 | FW | ESP | Javi Gomila |
| 20 | DF | ESP | Sergio Rivas (on loan from Salamanca) |
| 21 | MF | ESP | Fer Cano |
| 22 | MF | ESP | Adrián Lois |
| 23 | FW | ESP | Antonio Salinas |
| 24 | MF | ESP | Rubén Moreno |
| 28 | MF | ESP | César Girón |
| 29 | FW | ESP | Jesús Rodríguez |
| 31 | MF | ESP | Francisco Giménez |
| — | FW | ESP | Manel Busquets |
