= CF Villanovense =

Association football club in Spain

Coordinates: 38.974739°N 5.786171°W

Villanovense
- Full name: Club de Fútbol Villanovense
- Founded: 1992
- Ground: Estadio Romero Cuerda, Villanueva de la Serena, Extremadura, Spain
- Capacity: 5,000
- President: José María Tapia
- Head coach: José González Barrantes
- League: Tercera Federación – Group 14
- 2025–26: Tercera Federación – Group 4, 18th of 18
Home colours	Away colours

Club de Fútbol Villanovense is a Spanish football team based in Villanueva de la Serena, in the autonomous community of Extremadura. Founded in 1992 it plays in Tercera Federación – Group 14, holding home matches at Estadio Romero Cuerda, with a capacity of 5,000 seats.

== History ==
Original crest, used until 2017.

CF Villanovense was founded in 1992 with the aim to replace dissolved CD Villanovense. In the 2014–15 season, the club played for the first time the promotion play-offs to Segunda División, being eliminated in the first round by Bilbao Athletic.

The following season, the team reached the last 32 of the Copa del Rey, where they faced reigning league, cup and European champions Barcelona. Despite holding the Catalans to a goalless draw in the first leg at home, they lost 6–1 on aggregate.

In the 2016–17 season, Villanovense qualified again for the promotion play-offs, but after beating Fuenlabrada in the first round, they were eliminated by Racing de Santander 4–2 on aggregate despite winning the first leg.

Villanovense again made the last 32 of the Copa del Rey in 2018–19, losing by a single André Silva goal to top-flight Sevilla. The league campaign ended with relegation to the Tercera División, bouncing back immediately in July 2020 with a playoff victory over Cacereño; despite a 1–1 draw in the final, they advanced as seeds having won the group.

== Season to season ==
Season	Tier	Division	Place	Copa del Rey
1992–93	5	Reg. Pref.	6th	
1993–94	5	Reg. Pref.	14th	
1994–95	5	Reg. Pref.	3rd	
1995–96	5	Reg. Pref.	1st	
1996–97	4	3ª	16th	
1997–98	4	3ª	5th	
1998–99	4	3ª	12th	
1999–2000	4	3ª	4th	
2000–01	4	3ª	6th	
2001–02	4	3ª	4th	
2002–03	4	3ª	3rd	
2003–04	3	2ª B	19th	
2004–05	4	3ª	2nd	
2005–06	4	3ª	1st	
2006–07	3	2ª B	19th	First round
2007–08	4	3ª	3rd	
2008–09	4	3ª	3rd	
2009–10	3	2ª B	17th	
2010–11	4	3ª	1st	
2011–12	3	2ª B	9th	Second round

Season	Tier	Division	Place	Copa del Rey
2012–13	3	2ª B	16th	
2013–14	4	3ª	1st	
2014–15	3	2ª B	4th	Second round
2015–16	3	2ª B	12th	Round of 32
2016–17	3	2ª B	3rd	
2017–18	3	2ª B	6th	First round
2018–19	3	2ª B	18th	Round of 32
2019–20	4	3ª	1st	
2020–21	3	2ª B	4th / 3rd	First round
2021–22	4	2ª RFEF	8th	
2022–23	4	2ª Fed.	6th	
2023–24	4	2ª Fed.	11th	Second round
2024–25	4	2ª Fed.	13th	
2025–26	5	3ª Fed.	8th	
2026–27	5	3ª Fed.		

- 11 seasons in Segunda División B
- 4 seasons in Segunda Federación/Segunda División RFEF
- 14 seasons in Tercera División
- 2 seasons in Tercera Federación

== Current squad ==
As of 22 July 2023

Note: Flags indicate national team as defined under FIFA eligibility rules; some limited exceptions apply. Players may hold more than one non-FIFA nationality.

No.	Pos.	Nation	Player
3	DF	ESP	José Tapia (captain)
4	DF	ESP	Javi Sánchez
5	DF	ESP	Javi Lobato
6	MF	ESP	Ángel Pajuelo
7	FW	ESP	Álvaro Méndez
8	MF	ESP	Álvaro Clausí
9	FW	ESP	José Rivera
11	FW	ESP	Jesús Sillero
12	DF	ESP	Samuel Hurtado
13	GK	ESP	Sergio Tienza

No.	Pos.	Nation	Player
15	FW	ESP	Israel Cano (on loan from Betis B)
16	MF	ESP	Roger Colomina
18	DF	ESP	Adrián Escudero
19	DF	ESP	Moisés Rodríguez
20	FW	ESP	Seth Airam (on loan from Cádiz)
21	FW	ESP	Óscar Muñoz
22	DF	ESP	José Antonio Espín
—	MF	ESP	Lolo Garrido
—	MF	ESP	David Sánchez

== Honours ==
- Tercera División: (4) 2005–06, 2010–11, 2013–14, 2019–20
