= Ángel Pajuelo =

Spanish footballer (born 1987)

Personal information
- Full name: Ángel Pajuelo Zazo
- Date of birth: 1 August 1987 (age 39)
- Place of birth: Villanueva de la Serena, Spain
- Height: 1.78 m (5 ft 10 in)
- Position: Midfielder

Team information
- Current team: Villanovense
- Number: 6

Youth career
- Villanovense

Senior career*
Years	Team	Apps	(Gls)
2003–	Villanovense	370+	(10+)
- * Club domestic league appearances and goals as of 5 May 2025

Ángel Pajuelo Zazo (born 1 August 1987) is a Spanish footballer who plays as a midfielder for Tercera Federación club Villanovense. From his debut on 12 October 2003, he has spent his entire senior career at Villanovense and made over 500 appearances across all competitions.

== Career ==
Born in Villanueva de la Serena in the Province of Badajoz, Pajuelo was an academy player for hometown club CF Villanovense. He made his debut aged 16 on 12 October 2003 as a last-minute substitute in a 3–0 home loss to Vecindario in the third-tier Segunda División B. He made two more appearances off the bench as the team were relegated to the Tercera División. Pajuelo combined his football career with working as an insurance agent.

In October 2015, before facing Barcelona in the last 32 of the Copa del Rey, Pajuelo told national newspaper El Mundo "I don't want to leave [Villanovense], it's a feeling. I feel comfortable, it's my town, I defend my team. Every footballer wants something more, but for me to leave Villanovense, it has to be to something bigger. But there's no place like home". In the first leg on 28 October, he captained the club to a goalless draw against the La Liga opponents; his team lost the second leg 6–1 at the Camp Nou.

In 2016–17, Pajuelo played 33 games including the playoffs and scored once, as Villanovense made the semi-finals for promotion to the Segunda División. Following the elimination by Racing de Santander, he extended his contract.

Villanovense faced a top-flight opponent again in the last 32 of the Copa del Rey in 2018–19, namely Sevilla. Pajuelo's side taunted their visitors with a poster with the slogan "You have five [UEFA Europa League titles] but we have [Pajuelo wearing number] six". In the first leg on 1 November, he missed an open goal with a header in a goalless draw; Sevilla won the second leg at the Ramón Sánchez-Pizjuán Stadium with a goal by André Silva.

Having not scored a goal in the third division since November 2018, 35-year-old Pajuelo netted in two consecutive games in January 2023, as his team won their first three games of the calendar year. In June, approaching two decades since his debut, he extended his contract for another year.

On 10 March 2024, Pajuelo played his 500th game for his club, a 1–0 home loss to fellow Extremadurans Navalcarnero. He renewed his contract in June 2025, with the team having been relegated to the fifth-tier Tercera Federación after losing a playoff to Real Madrid C. The city council in Villanueva de la Serena unanimously awarded Pajuelo its Sirena de Oro award on 30 January 2026, describing him as a "sign of sporting identity".
