= Sergio Navarro (footballer, born 2001) =

Spanish footballer

Personal information
- Full name: Sergio Navarro Romero
- Date of birth: 16 February 2001 (age 25)
- Place of birth: Madrid, Spain
- Height: 1.76 m (5 ft 9 in)
- Position: Winger

Team information
- Current team: Cacereño
- Number: 16

Youth career
- 2009–2011: Chinchón
- 2011–2014: Real Madrid
- 2014–2020: Leganés

Senior career*
Years	Team	Apps	(Gls)
2020	Leganés C	1	(1)
2020–2021	Carabanchel	20	(2)
2021–2022	Navalcarnero	30	(1)
2022–2023	Leganés B	31	(5)
2023–2024	Leganés	4	(0)
2023	→ Murcia (loan)	1	(0)
2024	→ Rayo Majadahonda (loan)	19	(1)
2024–2025	Alcorcón	31	(4)
2026	Arenas Club	7	(0)
2026–	Cacereño	5	(0)
- * Club domestic league appearances and goals as of 27 September 2026

Sergio Navarro Romero (born 16 February 2001) is a Spanish footballer who plays mainly as a right winger for Primera Federación club Cacereño.

== Club career ==
Born in Madrid, Navarro represented EM Chinchón before joining Real Madrid's La Fábrica in 2011. He left the club three years later, and signed for CD Leganés.

Navarro made his senior debut with Leganés' C-team on 12 January 2020, starting and scoring his side's only in a 3–1 away loss against CF Atlético Valdeiglesias. On 16 August, he moved to Tercera División side RCD Carabanchel.

On 9 July 2021, Navarro was announced at Segunda División RFEF side CDA Navalcarnero. On 22 July of the following year, he returned to Lega and was assigned to the reserves also in the fourth division.

Navarro made his first team debut for the Pepineros on 9 April 2023, coming on as a second-half substitute for Juanjo Narváez in a 1–0 away win over SD Ponferradina in the Segunda División.

On 1 September 2023, Navarro was loaned to Primera Federación side Real Murcia, for one year. The following 3 January, after featuring in just nine minutes for the club, his loan was terminated and he moved to fellow league team CF Rayo Majadahonda also in a temporary deal.

On 14 July 2024, Navarro agreed to a contract with AD Alcorcón, freshly relegated to division three.
