= Estadio Príncipe Felipe =

Stadium in Spain

Coordinates: 39.4871°N 6.4123°W

Príncipe Felipe
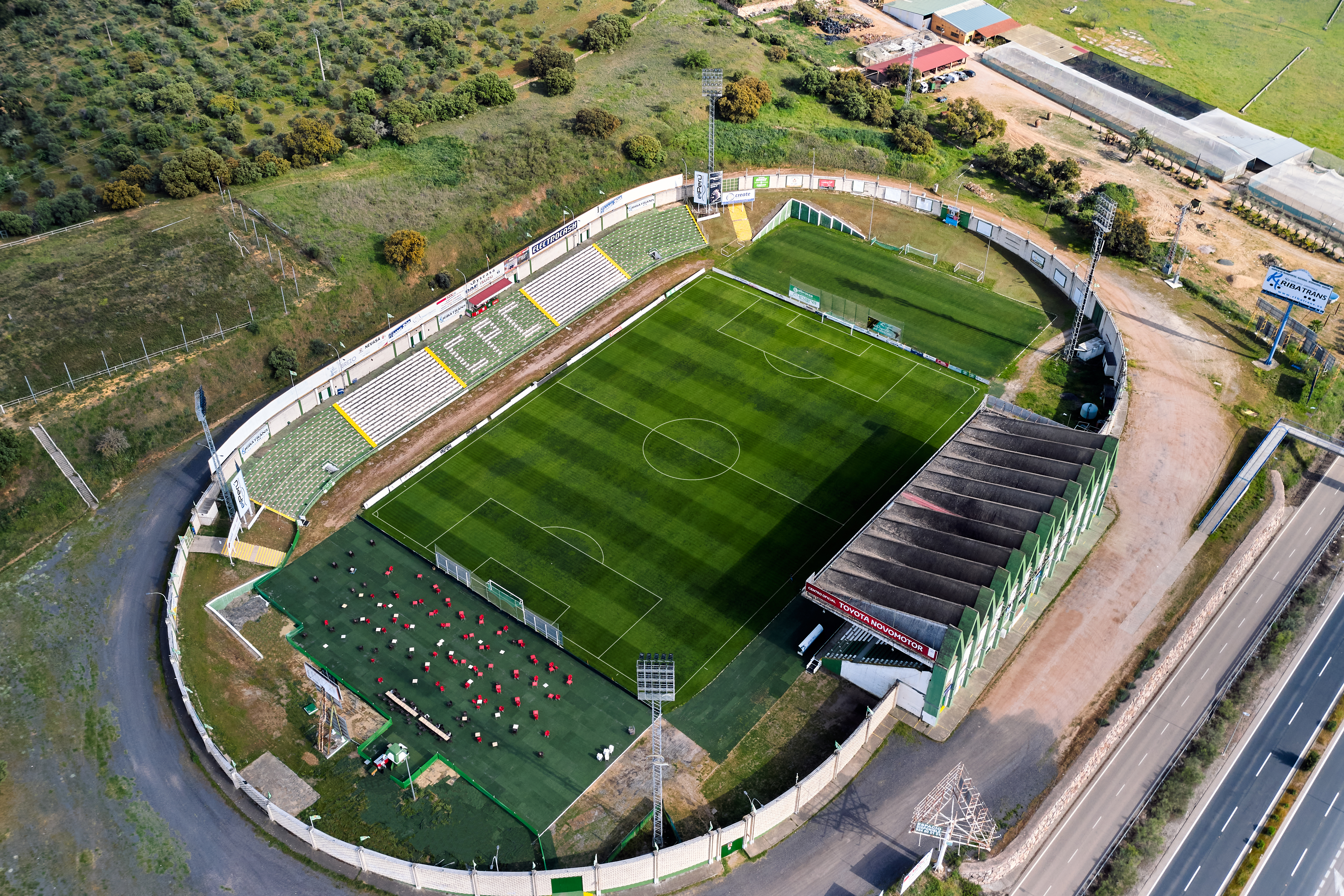
- Interactive map of Príncipe Felipe
- Full name: Estadio Príncipe Felipe
- Location: Cáceres, Spain
- Capacity: 7,000
- Surface: Grass
- Field size: 105 m × 73 m (344 ft × 240 ft)

Construction
- Opened: 1977

Tenant
- CP Cacereño

The Estadio Príncipe Felipe is a football stadium located in Cáceres, Extremadura, Spain. It is currently the home ground of CP Cacereño.

== History ==
The first game on Estadio Prínce Felipe was played on March 26, 1977.
