= CA Antoniano =

Association football club in Spain

Atlético Antoniano
- Full name: Club Atlético Antoniano
- Founded: 1964; 1994 (refounded)
- Ground: Municipal de Lebrija; Lebrija, Spain
- Capacity: 3,500
- Chairman: (Spain) José Luis López
- Manager: (Spain) Jesús Falcón
- League: Segunda Federación – Group 4
- 2025–26: Segunda Federación – Group 4, 12th of 18
Home colours	Away colours

Club Atlético Antoniano is a Spanish football team based in Lebrija, Province of Seville, in the autonomous community of Andalusia. Founded in 1964, it plays in Segunda Federación – Group 4, holding home games at Estadio Municipal de Lebrija, with a capacity of 3,500 seats.

== History ==
Founded in 1964 as Juventud Antoniana, the club first reached Tercera División in the 1987–88 season, achieving an impressive fifth position. In that year, however, the club merged with UB Lebrijana to create CD Lebrija, in order to strengthen football in the city.

In 1994, as the merger was undone, Antoniano was refounded, and returned to the fourth division in 2001.

== Season to season ==
=== Atlético Antoniano (1960) ===
Season	Tier	Division	Place	Copa del Rey
1964–73	—	Regional	—	
1973–74	6	2ª Reg.	8th	
1974–75	6	2ª Reg.	8th	
1975–76	6	2ª Reg.	—	
1976–77	6	2ª Reg.	—	
1977–78	7	2ª Reg.	—	
1978–79	7	2ª Reg.	7th	
1979–80	7	2ª Reg.	1st	
1980–81	6	1ª Reg.	5th	

Season	Tier	Division	Place	Copa del Rey
1981–82	6	1ª Reg.	17th	
1982–83	7	2ª Reg.	7th	
1983–84	7	2ª Reg.	1st	
1984–85	6	1ª Reg.	2nd	
1985–86	5	Reg. Pref.	16th	
1986–87	5	Reg. Pref.	1st	
1987–88	4	3ª	5th	
1988–1994	as CD Lebrija			

- 1 season in Tercera División

=== Atlético Antoniano (1994) ===
Season	Tier	Division	Place	Copa del Rey
1994–95	7	2ª Reg.	1st	
1995–96	6	1ª Reg.	2nd	
1996–97	6	1ª Reg.	1st	
1997–98	5	Reg. Pref.	9th	
1998–99	5	Reg. Pref.	8th	
1999–00	5	Reg. Pref.	1st	
2000–01	5	Reg. Pref.	1st	
2001–02	4	3ª	3rd	
2002–03	4	3ª	11th	
2003–04	4	3ª	13th	
2004–05	4	3ª	19th	
2005–06	5	1ª And.	8th	
2006–07	5	1ª And.	9th	
2007–08	5	1ª And.	1st	
2008–09	4	3ª	19th	
2009–10	5	1ª And.	4th	
2010–11	5	1ª And.	1st	
2011–12	4	3ª	13th	
2012–13	4	3ª	18th	
2013–14	5	1ª And.	9th	

Season	Tier	Division	Place	Copa del Rey
2014–15	5	1ª And.	4th	
2015–16	5	1ª And.	2nd	
2016–17	4	3ª	18th	
2017–18	5	Div. Hon.	5th	
2018–19	5	Div. Hon.	1st	
2019–20	4	3ª	7th	First round
2020–21	4	3ª	6th / 6th	
2021–22	5	3ª RFEF	13th	
2022–23	5	3ª Fed.	1st	
2023–24	4	2ª Fed.	10th	First round
2024–25	4	2ª Fed.	4th	
2025–26	4	2ª Fed.	12th	Second round
2026–27	4	2ª Fed.		

- 4 seasons in Segunda Federación
- 10 seasons in Tercera División
- 2 seasons in Tercera Federación/Tercera División RFEF

== Former players ==
- (Spain) Miguel Ángel Cordero
- (Spain) Cala
- (Spain) Toni
- (Spain) Isaac Romero
