= CP Cacereño =

Association football club

Cacereño
- Full name: Club Polideportivo Cacereño, S.A.D.
- Nicknames: Verdiblancos; El Decano del Fútbol Extremeño
- Founded: 16 April 1919; 107 years ago as Club Deportivo Cacereño
- Stadium: Príncipe Felipe
- Capacity: 7,000
- Owner(s): Riba Sport Gestión, S.L.
- President: Carlos Ordóñez
- Head coach: Julio Cobos
- League: Primera Federación – Group 1
- 2025–26: Primera Federación – Group 1, 15th of 20
- Website: cpcacereno.com
Home colours	Away colours	Third colours

Club Polideportivo Cacereño is a Spanish football team based in Cáceres, in the autonomous community of Extremadura. Founded in 1919, the club plays in Primera Federación – Group 1, and holds home games at Estadio Príncipe Felipe, with a capacity of 7,000 seats. It is the oldest football club in the region of Extremadura.

== Club names ==
- Club Deportivo Cacereño - (1919–80)
- Club Polideportivo Cacereño - (1980–)

== Season to season ==
Season	Tier	Division	Place	Copa del Rey
1939–40	4	1ª Reg.	1st	
1940–41	4	1ª Reg.		
1941–42	3	1ª Reg.	2nd	
1942–43	3	1ª Reg.	2nd	
1943–44	3	3ª	1st	
1944–45	3	3ª	7th	
1945–46	3	3ª	2nd	
1946–47	3	3ª	6th	
1947–48	3	3ª	4th	Second round
1948–49	3	3ª	8th	Second round
1949–50	3	3ª	14th	
1950–51	3	3ª	1st	
1951–52	3	3ª	1st	
1952–53	2	2ª	16th	First round
1953–54	3	3ª	2nd	
1954–55	3	3ª	6th	
1955–56	3	3ª	2nd	
1956–57	3	3ª	2nd	
1957–58	3	3ª	7th	
1958–59	3	3ª	3rd	

Season	Tier	Division	Place	Copa del Rey
1959–60	3	3ª	6th	
1960–61	3	3ª	1st	
1961–62	3	3ª	3rd	
1962–63	3	3ª	3rd	
1963–64	3	3ª	4th	
1964–65	3	3ª	2nd	
1965–66	3	3ª	4th	
1966–67	3	3ª	7th	
1967–68	3	3ª	1st	
1968–69	3	3ª	4th	
1969–70	3	3ª	16th	Second round
1970–71	4	1ª Reg.	1st	
1971–72	3	3ª	14th	First round
1972–73	4	1ª Reg.	1st	
1973–74	3	3ª	17th	Second round
1974–75	4	Reg. Pref.	1st	
1975–76	3	3ª	8th	First round
1976–77	3	3ª	11th	First round
1977–78	4	3ª	1st	First round
1978–79	3	2ª B	18th	First round

Season	Tier	Division	Place	Copa del Rey
1979–80	4	3ª	5th	Third round
1980–81	4	3ª	4th	
1981–82	4	3ª	1st	Second round
1982–83	4	3ª	3rd	First round
1983–84	4	3ª	3rd	
1984–85	4	3ª	3rd	First round
1985–86	4	3ª	3rd	Second round
1986–87	4	3ª	1st	First round
1987–88	3	2ª B	19th	
1988–89	4	3ª	3rd	First round
1989–90	4	3ª	2nd	
1990–91	4	3ª	2nd	Second round
1991–92	4	3ª	2nd	Second round
1992–93	3	2ª B	5th	First round
1993–94	3	2ª B	12th	Third round
1994–95	3	2ª B	19th	First round
1995–96	4	3ª	1st	
1996–97	3	2ª B	12th	First round
1997–98	3	2ª B	1st	
1998–99	3	2ª B	14th	Second round

Season	Tier	Division	Place	Copa del Rey
1999–2000	3	2ª B	18th	
2000–01	4	3ª	4th	
2001–02	4	3ª	1st	
2002–03	3	2ª B	6th	Preliminary
2003–04	3	2ª B	17th	Round of 64
2004–05	4	3ª	7th	
2005–06	4	3ª	9th	
2006–07	4	3ª	4th	
2007–08	4	3ª	9th	
2008–09	4	3ª	2nd	
2009–10	3	2ª B	15th	
2010–11	3	2ª B	13th	
2011–12	3	2ª B	7th	
2012–13	3	2ª B	12th	Round of 32
2013–14	3	2ª B	10th	
2014–15	3	2ª B	12th	
2015–16	3	2ª B	16th	
2016–17	4	3ª	1st	
2017–18	4	3ª	2nd	First round
2018–19	4	3ª	2nd	

Season	Tier	Division	Place	Copa del Rey
2019–20	4	3ª	3rd	Second round
2020–21	4	3ª	1st / 1st	
2021–22	4	2ª RFEF	3rd	
2022–23	4	2ª Fed.	4th	Round of 32
2023–24	4	2ª Fed.	6th	First round
2024–25	4	2ª Fed.	2nd	Second round
2025–26	3	1ª Fed.	15th	First round
2026–27	3	1ª Fed.		

- 1 season in Segunda División
- 2 seasons in Primera Federación
- 18 seasons in Segunda División B
- 4 seasons in Segunda Federación/Segunda División RFEF
- 56 seasons in Tercera División

== Current squad ==
As of 4 February 2026

Note: Flags indicate national team as defined under FIFA eligibility rules; some limited exceptions apply. Players may hold more than one non-FIFA nationality.

No.	Pos.	Nation	Player
1	GK	ESP	Diego Nieves
2	DF	ESP	Iván Martínez
3	DF	ESP	Manolo Molina
4	DF	ESP	Pablo Barea
5	MF	ESP	Toño Calvo
6	MF	ESP	Nico Conesa
7	FW	ESP	Iván Fernández
8	MF	ESP	Álvaro Gete
9	FW	MAR	Oussama Chit
10	FW	ESP	Runy
11	FW	ESP	Álex Monerris
13	GK	ESP	Germán García

No.	Pos.	Nation	Player
14	DF	ESP	José Manuel Alonso
15	DF	ESP	Víctor Rodríguez (on loan from Leganés)
16	FW	ESP	Sergio Navarro
17	DF	ESP	Sergi López
18	FW	ESP	Juan Artola
19	DF	ESP	Marcos Sevila
20	FW	ESP	Ignacio Tellechea
21	MF	ESP	Luis Sánchez
22	DF	ESP	Adrián Expósito
23	FW	ESP	José González
24	MF	ESP	Unai Rodríguez (on loan from Villarreal)

=== Reserve team ===
Note: Flags indicate national team as defined under FIFA eligibility rules; some limited exceptions apply. Players may hold more than one non-FIFA nationality.

No.	Pos.	Nation	Player
26	FW	ESP	Mario Valiente
27	FW	ESP	Iker Bidaurrazaga

== Famous players ==
- (Spain) Álex Alegría
- (Spain) Julio Cobos
- (Spain) Manolo
