= 2018–19 Copa Federación de España =

Tournament details
- Country: Spain
- Teams: 34 (in national phase)

Final positions
- Champions: Mirandés (1st title)
- Runners-up: Cornellà

Tournament statistics
- Matches played: 66
- Goals scored: 189 (2.86 per match)
- Top goal scorer(s): Claudio Medina (7 goals)

The 2018–19 Copa Federación de España was the 26th edition of the Copa Federación de España, also known as Copa RFEF, a knockout competition for Spanish football clubs in Segunda División B and Tercera División.

Mirandés won the trophy, a cash prize of €90,152 and the qualification for the next year tournament. The runner-up received a cash prize of €30,051 and every semifinalist €12,020. Additionally, each winner of autonomous community tournament received €3,005.

The competition began in late July 2018 with the first games of the Regional stages and ended on 28 March 2019 with the national final.

== Regional tournaments ==
=== West Andalusia and Ceuta tournament ===
Betis Deportivo was the only registered team and qualified directly for national phase.

=== East Andalusia and Melilla tournament ===
Huétor Tájar was the only registered team and qualified directly for national phase.

=== Aragon tournament ===
For the 2018–19 edition, eight teams joined the tournament.

==== Group 1 ====
Pos	Team	Pld	W	D	L	GF	GA	GD	Pts	Qualification	ARA	ROB	ALM	TAM
1	Deportivo Aragón	3	2	1	0	6	1	+5	7	Qualification to the final	—	1–1	2–0	—
2	Robres	3	1	1	1	3	3	0	4		—	—	—	1–0
3	Almudévar	3	1	0	2	4	6	−2	3		—	2–1	—	—
4	Tamarite	3	1	0	2	3	6	−3	3		0–3	—	3–2	—

Source: Federación Aragonesa de Fútbol

==== Group 2 ====
Pos	Team	Pld	W	D	L	GF	GA	GD	Pts	Qualification	EJE	ILL	UTE	BOR
1	Ejea	3	2	1	0	4	2	+2	7	Qualification to the final	—	1–0	—	—
2	Illueca	3	2	0	1	6	1	+5	6		—	—	—	3–0
3	Utebo	3	0	2	1	2	5	−3	2		2–2	0–3	—	—
4	Borja	3	0	1	2	0	4	−4	1		0–1	—	0–0	—

Source: Federación Aragonesa de Fútbol
Rules for classification: 1) Points; 2) Head-to-head results; 3) Goal difference; 4) Number of goals scored.

==== Final ====
5 September 2018	Ejea	2–2 (4–3 p)	Deportivo Aragón	Ejea de los Caballeros
19:30	Héctor Otín 46'; Adrià de Mesa 52'	Report	Carlos Vicente 1'; Junior 26'	Stadium: Municipal; Referee: Adrián Lixandru

=== Asturias tournament ===
The twelve qualified teams will be divided into four groups of three teams, where the winners will qualify for the semifinals. Teams will be drawn according to their league positions in the previous season.

Pot 1	Pot 2	Pot 3
Marino Luanco; Sporting Gijón B Lealtad; Caudal	Oviedo B Llanes; Covadonga; Ceares	Tuilla; Praviano; L'Entregu; San Martín

==== Group 1 ====
Pos	Team	Pld	W	D	L	GF	GA	GD	Pts	Qualification	LEA	CEA	TUI
1	Lealtad	4	2	2	0	5	3	+2	8	Qualification to the semifinals	—	1–0	1–1
2	Ceares	4	1	2	1	2	2	0	5		1–1	—	0–0
3	Tuilla	4	0	2	2	2	4	−2	2		1–2	0–1	—

Source: Fútbol Asturiano
Rules for classification: 1) Points; 2) Head-to-head results; 3) Goal difference; 4) Number of goals scored.

==== Group 2 ====
Pos	Team	Pld	W	D	L	GF	GA	GD	Pts	Qualification	ENT	OVI	CAU
1	L'Entregu	4	2	2	0	9	4	+5	8	Qualification to the semifinals	—	3–1	3–3
2	Oviedo B	4	1	1	2	4	5	−1	4		0–0	—	3–0
3	Caudal	4	1	1	2	5	9	−4	4		0–3 (Note: Game was awarded to L'Entregu after illegal alignment of Caudal. Match initially ended 0–0.)	2–0	—

Source: Fútbol Asturiano
Rules for classification: 1) Points; 2) Head-to-head results; 3) Goal difference; 4) Number of goals scored.

==== Group 3 ====
Pos	Team	Pld	W	D	L	GF	GA	GD	Pts	Qualification	SPO	COV	PRA
1	Sporting Gijón B	4	3	0	1	14	6	+8	9	Qualification to the semifinals	—	3–2	4–0
2	Covadonga	4	2	0	2	7	7	0	6		0–4	—	4–0
3	Praviano	4	1	0	3	4	12	−8	3		4–3	0–1	—

Source: Fútbol Asturiano
Rules for classification: 1) Points; 2) Head-to-head results; 3) Goal difference; 4) Number of goals scored.

==== Group 4 ====
Pos	Team	Pld	W	D	L	GF	GA	GD	Pts	Qualification	MAR	LLA	SMA
1	Marino Luanco	4	3	0	1	11	2	+9	9	Qualification to the semifinals	—	1–0	5–0
2	Llanes	4	3	0	1	6	3	+3	9		2–1	—	2–1
3	San Martín	4	0	0	4	0	12	−12	0		0–4	0–2	—

Source: Fútbol Asturiano
Rules for classification: 1) Points; 2) Head-to-head results; 3) Goal difference; 4) Number of goals scored.

==== Knockout stage ====
Semi-final
5 and 19 September
Lealtad	4	3	7
L'Entregu	1	1	2
12 and 26 September
Sporting Gijón B	1	2	3
Marino Luanco	1	0	1

Final
24 October – Mieres
Lealtad (p)	1 (4)
Sporting Gijón B	1 (3)

==== Final ====
24 October 2018	Lealtad	1–1 (4–3 p)	Sporting Gijón B	Mieres
18:30	Robert Martínez 63'	Report	Chiki 14'	Stadium: Hermanos Antuña; Attendance: 450; Referee: Romero García

=== Balearic Islands tournament ===
The draw was made 5 July.

Semi-final
5 and 12 September
Platges de Calvià	1	0	1
Formentera	2	0	2

Final
19 and 26 September
Peña Deportiva	4	1	5
Formentera	1	1	2

==== Final ====
19 September 2018	Peña Deportiva	4–1	Formentera	Santa Eulària
19:00	Romero 18'; Vidal 86'; Pipo 88'; Cristeto 90'	Report	Javi Boix 77' (pen.)	Stadium: Municipal; Attendance: 150; Referee: Thierry Torres

26 September 2018	Formentera	1–1 (2–5 agg.)	Peña Deportiva	Sant Francesc Xavier
19:00	Víctor Ruiz 13'	Report	Nacho 32'	Stadium: Municipal; Referee: Manuel Martínez

=== Basque Country tournament ===
Tournament will be played in two stages, the first with two groups, one of three teams and the other with two. Winners will play the final over two matches. The group stage phase was drawn on 6 September by Basque Football Federation.

==== Group 1 ====
Pos	Team	Pld	W	D	L	GF	GA	GD	Pts	Qualification	RUN	ARE	POR
1	Real Unión	2	1	1	0	5	2	+3	4	Qualification to the final	—	0–0	—
2	Arenas	2	1	1	0	1	0	+1	4		—	—	1–0
3	Portugalete	2	0	0	2	2	6	−4	0		2–5	—	—

Updated to match(es) played on 3 October 2018. Source: Federación Vasca de Fútbol
Rules for classification: 1) Points; 2) Goal difference; 3) Number of goals scored; 4) Head-to-head results.

==== Group 2 ====
Semi-final
19 September and 3 October
R. Sociedad C	0	2	2
Zamudio	4	0	4

==== Final ====
17 October 2018	Real Unión	2–0	Zamudio	Irun
	Etxaburu 54'; Capelete 89'	Report		Stadium: Stadium Gal; Referee: Díaz Méndez

24 October 2018	Zamudio	2–2 (2–4 agg.)	Real Unión	Zamudio
20:00	Arroyo 28'; Txabo 70'	Report	Lizarraga 58'; Letamendia 78'	Stadium: Gazituaga

=== Canary Islands tournament ===
Tenerife B was the only registered team and qualified directly for national phase.

=== Cantabria tournament ===
Teams qualified between second and ninth place in 2017–18 Tercera División Group 3 registered for playing the competition. The bracket was drawn on 11 July. Quarter-finals and Semi-finals will be played in Cabezón de la Sal.

Quarter-finals
9 August
Tropezón	2
Sámano	1
10 August
Laredo	1
Textil Escudo	0
11 August
Racing Santander B	1 (1)
Cayón (p)	1 (4)
11 August
Escobedo (p)	0 (4)
Barreda	0 (3)

Semi-finals
15 August
Tropezón	2
Laredo	0
15 August
Cayón	0
Escobedo	1

Final
12 September - Santander
Tropezón (a.e.t.)	3
Escobedo	2

==== Final ====
12 September 2018	Tropezón	3–2 (a.e.t.)	Escobedo	Santander
20:30	Miki 97', 120+1'; Riki 105'	Report	Vitali 93'; Izan 117'	Stadium: El Sardinero; Referee: Zubillaga Serrano

=== Castile-La Mancha tournament ===
The Castile-La Mancha Football Federation announced the XVII Torneo Junta de Comunidades de Castilla La Mancha as the regional Copa RFEF qualifying tournament.

Previous round
28 July and 4 August
Calvo Sotelo	3	2	5
Mora	0	3	3
28 July and 4 August
Tarancón (p)	1	0	1
Guadalajara	0	1	1

Quarter-finals
25 July and 11 August
Albacete B	1	3	4
Atlético Ibañés (p)	3	1	4
11 and 19 August
Socuéllamos	2	0	2
Villarrobledo	0	1	1
13 and 18 August
Calvo Sotelo	0	0	0
Villarrubia	1	2	3
10 and 15 August
Tarancón (p)	1	1	2
Toledo	1	1	2

Semi-finals
28 August and 5 September
Atlético Ibañés	0	0	0
Socuéllamos	3	2	5
29 August and 5 September
Villarrubia	1	0	1
Tarancón	0	0	0

Final
17 October
Socuéllamos	1
Villarrubia	0

==== Final ====
17 October 2018	Socuéllamos	1–0	Villarrubia	Socuéllamos
20:00	Megías 90+6' (pen.)	Report		Stadium: Paquito Jiménez

=== Castile and León tournament ===
The competition will be played in a group stage between three teams, all of them from the province of Burgos. The group was drawn on 4 September 2018.

Pos	Team	Pld	W	D	L	GF	GA	GD	Pts	ARA	BUR	BUP
1	Arandina	2	1	1	0	5	2	+3	4	—	1–1	—
2	Burgos	2	1	1	0	3	1	+2	4	—	—	2–0
3	Bupolsa	2	0	0	2	1	6	−5	0	1–4	—	—

Source: Federación de Castilla y León de Fútbol
Rules for classification: 1) Points; 2) Goal difference; 3) Number of goals scored; 4) Head-to-head results.

=== Catalonia tournament ===
Llagostera was the only registered team and qualified directly for national phase.

=== Extremadura tournament ===
17 teams joined the tournament, consisting in a single-game knockout tournament. The preliminary round and the round of 16 were firstly drawn, and later each round was drawn independently.

Preliminary round
29 July
Arroyo	2
Diocesano	0

Round of 16
5 August
Valdivia	0
Castuera	1
4 August
Montijo	0
Mérida	2
5 August
Valdelacalzada	3
At. Pueblonuevo	2
5 August
Extremadura B	3
Aceuchal	0
5 August
Llerenense	0
Jerez	3
5 August
Moralo	3
Plasencia	0
5 August
Arroyo	0
Cacereño	3
1 August
Racing Valverdeño	0
Olivenza	1

Quarter-finals
11 August
Castuera	1
Mérida	4
11 August
Valdelacalzada	0
Extremadura B	1
12 August
Jerez	0
Moralo	3
11 August
Cacereño	6
Olivenza	1

Semi-finals
19 August
Mérida	2
Extremadura B	0
16 August
Moralo	0 (2)
Cacereño (p)	0 (3)

Final
11 October
Mérida	0 (4)
Cacereño (p)	0 (5)

==== Final ====
11 October 2018	Mérida	0–0 (4–5 p)	Cacereño	Mérida
20:00		Report		Stadium: Estadio Romano; Attendance: 1,500; Referee: Delfa Ramos

=== Galicia tournament ===
Twelve teams registered for playing the competition. The bracket was drawn on 6 July.

Qualifying round
29 July
Somozas (w.o.)
Racing Villalbés
29 July
Silva	0 (7)
Bergantiños (p)	0 (8)
29 July
Ourense CF	1 (3)
Arenteiro (p)	1 (5)
29 July
Alondras (w.o.)
Choco

Quarter-finals
12 August
Somozas	0
Bergantiños	2
12 August
Arenteiro (p)	1 (4)
Alondras	1 (2)
8 August
Ribadumia	3
Céltiga	1
8 August
Arosa	0
Coruxo	2

Semi-finals
19 August
Bergantiños	1
Arenteiro	0
18 August
Ribadumia	4
Coruxo	3

Final
10 October – Santiago de Compostela
Bergantiños (p)	2 (3)
Ribadumia	2 (2)

==== Final ====
10 October 2018	Bergantiños	2–2 (a.e.t.) (3–2 p)	Ribadumia	Santiago de Compostela
20:15	Ekedi 52' (pen.); Cañi 94'	Report	Hugo Soto 32'; Mota 112'	Stadium: San Lázaro; Referee: Vidal Fonseca

=== La Rioja tournament ===
The competition was drawn on 30 July.

Quarter-finals
12 August
Agoncillo	2
Anguiano	3
12 August
Náxara	4
UD Logroñés Promesas	1

Semi-finals
18 August
Anguiano	0
Varea	5
19 August
Náxara	1 (4)
SD Logroñés (p)	1 (5)

Final
12 September – Agoncillo
Varea	2
SD Logroñés	1

==== Final ====
12 September 2018	Varea	2–1	SD Logroñés	Agoncillo
20:00	Chimbo 32'; Míchel 49'	Report	Miguel 54'	Stadium: San Roque; Referee: Rodríguez Tejea

=== Madrid tournament ===
The competition will be played in a group stage between three teams.

Pos	Team	Pld	W	D	L	GF	GA	GD	Pts	ALC	SAN	MOS
1	Alcobendas Sport	2	1	1	0	6	4	+2	4	—	3–3	—
2	San Sebastián de los Reyes	2	1	1	0	5	4	+1	4	—	—	2–1
3	Móstoles URJC	2	0	0	2	2	5	−3	0	1–3	—	—

Updated to match(es) played on 3 October 2018. Source: Federación Fútbol de Madrid
Rules for classification: 1) Points; 2) Goal difference; 3) Number of goals scored; 4) Head-to-head results.

=== Murcia tournament ===
The competition was drawn on 24 August 2018.

Quarter-finals
29 August and 5 September
Minerva	2	1	3
Cartagena B	2	3	5
29 August and 5 September
Lorca Deportiva	0	2	2
Atlético Pulpileño	2	2	4
30 August and 6 September
Estudiantes (a)	1	2	3
UCAM Murcia B	1	2	3
29 August and 5 September
Churra	2	0	2
Los Garres (a)	1	1	2

Semi-finals
12 and 19 September
Cartagena B (a)	0	1	1
Atlético Pulpileño	0	1	1
12 and 19 September
Estudiantes	6	1	7
Los Garres	0	1	1

Final
3 October
Cartagena B	3
Estudiantes	1

==== Final ====
3 October 2018	Cartagena B	3–1	Estudiantes	Cartagena
20:30	Mario 48'; Hamid 57'; Ismael 82'	Report	Belando 21'	Stadium: Cartagonova; Referee: Clemente Ortuño

=== Navarre tournament ===
The competition will be played in a group stage between three teams. The group was drawn on 8 August 2018.

Pos	Team	Pld	W	D	L	GF	GA	GD	Pts	PSP	CIR	ITA
1	Peña Sport	4	3	0	1	10	8	+2	9	—	3–2	2–1
2	Atlético Cirbonero	4	2	0	2	8	7	+1	6	2–1	—	4–0
3	Itaroa Huarte	4	1	0	3	7	10	−3	3	3–4	3–0	—

Source: Federación Navarra de Fútbol
Rules for classification: 1) Points; 2) Goal difference; 3) Number of goals scored; 4) Head-to-head results.

=== Valencian Community tournament ===
The competition will be played in three rounds in two leg ties.

Quarter-finals
12 and 15 August
Roda (p)	1	0	1
Acero	0	1	1
14 and 16 August
Silla (p)	1	2	3
Paiporta	2	1	3
12 and 15 August
Alcoyano	1	0	1
Alzira	4	0	4
11 and 15 August
La Nucía	1	2	3
Crevillente	1	0	1

Semi-finals
19 and 21 August
Roda	3	1	4
Silla	0	1	1
18 and 22 August
Alzira	2	2	4
La Nucía	2	3	5

Final
29 August and 5 September
Roda	2	1	3
La Nucía	0	1	1

==== Final ====
29 August 2018	Roda	2–0	La Nucía	Villarreal
19:30	Javi Rubio 69'; Martí 89'	Report		Stadium: Ciudad Esportiva; Referee: García Gallegos

5 September 2018	La Nucía	1–1 (1–3 agg.)	Roda	La Nucía
20:00	Fran 72'	Report	Colomer 23'	Stadium: Camilo Cano; Attendance: 1,000; Referee: Moreno Escrivá

== National tournament ==
The national tournament will begin in November 2018.

=== Qualified teams ===
Defending champion

(Galicia (Spain)) Pontevedra (3)

Teams losing Copa del Rey first round

(Basque Country (autonomous community)) Barakaldo (3)
Ceuta (4)
(Castilla–La Mancha) Conquense (3)
(Catalonia) Cornellà (3)
(Basque Country (autonomous community)) Cultural Durango (3)
(Extremadura) ~~Don Benito (3)~~
(Cantabria) ~~Gimnástica Torrelavega (3)~~
(Community of Madrid) Internacional (3)
(Asturias) Langreo (3)
(Andalusia) Marbella (3)
(Canary Islands) Mensajero (4)
(Castile and León) **Mirandés** (3)
(Community of Madrid) Navalcarnero (3)
(Balearic Islands) Poblense (4)
(Galicia (Spain)) ~~Rápido de Bouzas (3)~~
(Castilla–La Mancha) Talavera de la Reina (3)
(Aragon) Teruel (3)
(Region of Murcia) Yeclano (4)

Winners of Autonomous Communities tournaments

(Community of Madrid) Alcobendas Sport (4)
(Castile and León) Arandina (4)
(Galicia (Spain)) Bergantiños (4)
(Andalusia) Betis Deportivo (4)
(Extremadura) Cacereño (4)
(Region of Murcia) Cartagena B (4)
(Aragon) Ejea (3)
(Andalusia) Huétor Tájar (4)
(Asturias) Lealtad (4)
(Catalonia) Llagostera (4)
(Balearic Islands) Peña Deportiva (4)
(Navarre) Peña Sport (4)
(Basque Country (autonomous community)) Real Unión (3)
(Valencian Community) Roda (4)
(Castilla–La Mancha) Socuéllamos (4)
(Canary Islands) Tenerife B (4)
(Cantabria) Tropezón (4)
(La Rioja) Varea (4)

- (3) Team playing in 2018–19 Segunda División B (third tier)
- (4) Team playing in 2018–19 Tercera División (fourth tier)
- Slashed teams withdrew from the competition.
- Team in **bold** won the competition.

=== Preliminary round ===
The draw for the preliminary round and round of 32 was hold on 26 October 2018. The matches were played between 31 October and 7 November 2018.

Team 1	Agg.	Team 2	1st leg	2nd leg
**Teruel** (3) (Aragon)	3–1	(Valencian Community) Roda (4)	1–0	2–1
**Internacional** (3) (Community of Madrid)	5–2	(Community of Madrid) Alcobendas Sport (4)	1–2	4–0

==== First leg ====
31 October 2018	**Teruel**	**1–0**	**Roda**	Teruel
20:00	Sergio Sánchez 85'	Report		Stadium: Pinilla; Attendance: 300; Referee: García Reyes

1 November 2018	**Internacional**	**1–2**	**Alcobendas Sport**	Boadilla del Monte
11:00	Rafa Mella 43'		Álex Jiménez 47' 84'	Stadium: Municipal Ángel Nieto; Referee: Rodríguez Sánchez

==== Second leg ====
7 November 2018	Alcobendas Sport	**0–4** (**2–5** agg.)	**Internacional**	Alcobendas
12:00			Jaime Moreno 20' 82'; Álvaro Herrero 56'; Cedric Mabwati 63'	Stadium: Luis Aragonés

7 November 2018	Roda	**1–2** (**1–3** agg.)	**Teruel**	Villarreal
19:30	David Colomer 70'	Report	Gabi 13'; Sergio Sánchez 67'	Stadium: Ciutat Esportiva Pamesa Ceràmica

=== Round of 32 ===
The draw for the preliminary round and Round of 32 took place on 26 October 2018. The matches will be played between 15 November and 6 December 2018.

Team 1	Agg.	Team 2	1st leg	2nd leg
Lealtad (4) (Asturias)	1–2	(Galicia (Spain)) **Bergantiños** (4)	1–1	0–1
**Pontevedra** (3) (Galicia (Spain))	3–2	(Asturias) Langreo (3)	1–1	2–1
Cultural Durango (3) (Basque Country (autonomous community))	3–5	(Basque Country (autonomous community)) **Real Unión** (3)	0–2	3–3
Tropezón (4) (Cantabria)	5–6	(Basque Country (autonomous community)) **Barakaldo** (3)	2–3	3–3
**Peña Sport** (4) (Navarre)	3–0	(La Rioja) Varea (4)	1–0	2–0
Arandina (4) (Castile and León)	4–4 (2–4 p)	(Castile and León) **Mirandés** (3)	2–2	2–2 (a.e.t.)
Peña Deportiva (4) (Balearic Islands)	0–1	(Catalonia) **Llagostera** (4)	0–0	0–1
Ejea (3) (Aragon)	1–2	(Balearic Islands) **Poblense** (4)	1–0	0–2
**Cornellà** (3) (Catalonia)	6–6 (a)	(Aragon) Teruel (3)	4–1	2–5 (a.e.t.)
Cacereño (4) (Extremadura)	1–4	(Castilla–La Mancha) **Talavera de la Reina** (3)	0–2	1–2
**Navalcarnero** (3) (Community of Madrid)	6–4	(Canary Islands) Mensajero (4)	1–2	5–2
**Internacional** (3) (Community of Madrid)	4–1	(Canary Islands) Tenerife B (4)	2–1	2–0
**Conquense** (3) (Castilla–La Mancha)	4–4 (a)	(Region of Murcia) Yeclano (4)	2–1	2–3
Cartagena B (4) (Region of Murcia)	3–9	(Castilla–La Mancha) **Socuéllamos** (4)	2–3	1–6
Huétor Tájar (4) (Andalusia)	3–4	(Andalusia) **Betis Deportivo** (4)	2–2	1–2
Marbella (3) (Andalusia)	3–3 (a)	**Ceuta** (4)	2–2	1–1

==== First leg ====
15 November 2018	**Huétor Tájar**	**2–2**	**Betis Deportivo**	Huétor-Tájar
20:30	Manu Daza 35'; Esteban 40' (pen.)	Report	Altamirano 11'; Iván Navarro 60'	Stadium: Miguel Morato

21 November 2018	**Conquense**	**2–1**	**Yeclano**	Cuenca
15:30	Fran Pérez 60'; More 81' (pen.)	Report	Iker Torre 71' (pen.)	Stadium: La Fuensanta; Attendance: 200

21 November 2018	**Lealtad**	**1–1**	**Bergantiños**	Villaviciosa
15:45	René Pérez 16'	Report	Jonatan Martín 'Granada' 61'	Stadium: Les Caleyes; Attendance: 220; Referee: Marinero Noval

21 November 2018	**Cacereño**	**0–2**	**Talavera de la Reina**	Cáceres
16:00		Report	Abel Molinero 8' (pen.); Rubén Rivera 42'	Stadium: Príncipe Felipe; Attendance: 300; Referee: Pavón Guillén

21 November 2018	**Cartagena B**	**2–3**	**Socuéllamos**	Cartagena
16:00	Adrián Díaz Fernández 'Kuki' 45', 90'	Report	Carlos García 7'; Kike Domínguez 13'; Álvaro Garrido 85'	Stadium: Ciudad Jardín; Attendance: 200; Referee: Almagro Gil

21 November 2018	**Peña Deportiva**	**0–0**	**Llagostera**	Santa Eulària des Riu
17:00		Report		Stadium: Municipal; Referee: Martínez Campillos

21 November 2018	**Marbella**	**2–2**	**Ceuta**	Marbella
18:30	Manu Molina 16'; Marcos Ruiz 33'	Report	Prieto 14'; Chico 82'	Stadium: Estadio Municipal; Attendance: 300; Referee: Manrique Antequera

21 November 2018	**Peña Sport**	**1–0**	**Varea**	Tafalla
19:30	Prieto 21'	Report		Stadium: San Francisco

21 November 2018	**Pontevedra**	**1–1**	**Langreo**	Pontevedra
20:00	Kevin Presa 88' (pen.)	Report	Omar Sampedro 2'	Stadium: Pasarón; Attendance: 200; Referee: Villanueva Carballo

21 November 2018	**Cultural Durango**	**0–2**	**Real Unión**	Durango
20:00		Report	Orbegozo 8'; Lizarraga 87'	Stadium: Tabira; Referee: Guijarro Mercado

21 November 2018	**Tropezón**	**2–3**	**Barakaldo**	Tanos, Torrelavega
20:00	Jorge 40' (pen.); Perujo 62'	Report	Sergio Garcia 37'; Benito 44'; Galder Carreras 90+2'	Stadium: Santa Ana; Referee: Cobo Torres

21 November 2018	**Arandina**	**2–2**	**Mirandés**	Aranda de Duero
20:00	Zazu 14'; Diego Abad 34'	Report	Zunzunegui 10', 74'	Stadium: El Montecillo

21 November 2018	**Navalcarnero**	**1–2**	**Mensajero**	Navalcarnero
20:00	Sergio Bermejo 84'	Report	Alberto Jiménez 47'; Dani Hernández 51'	Stadium: Mariano González

21 November 2018	**Internacional**	**2–1**	**Tenerife B**	Boadilla del Monte
20:00	Herrero 60'; Tamayo 72'	Report	Tito 64'	Stadium: Municipal Ángel Nieto; Referee: López Fernández-Montes

21 November 2018	**Ejea**	**1–0**	**Poblense**	Ejea de los Caballeros
20:30	Luis Sánchez 30'	Report		Stadium: Municipal; Referee: Nadal Avellanas

21 November 2018	**Cornellà**	**4–1**	**Teruel**	Cornellà
20:45	Sergio Lou 8' (o.g.); Juan Fernández 45'; Borja Vicent 76' (o.g.); Miguel Fernández 88'	Report	Sergio Sánchez 62'	Stadium: Nou Camp; Referee: Fernández Pérez

==== Second leg ====
22 November 2018	**Betis Deportivo**	**2–1** (**4–3** agg.)	Huétor Tájar	Seville
20:00	Adrián Tellado 5'; Iván Navarro 38'	Report	Esteban 48' (pen.)	Stadium: Luis del Sol; Referee: Hernández Maestre

28 November 2018	**Ceuta**	**1–1** (**3–3** agg.)	Marbella	Ceuta
18:30	Chico Díaz 89'	Report	Jaime 16' (o.g.)	Stadium: Alfonso Murube; Referee: Driss Ahmed

28 November 2018	Yeclano	**3–2** (**4–4** agg.)	**Conquense**	Yecla
20:30	Rafa López 49'; Tonete 78'} Javi Muñoz 89'	Report	Adighibe 6'; More 23'	Stadium: La Constitución

29 November 2018	Varea	**0–2** (**0–3** agg.)	**Peña Sport**	Varea
19:30		Report	Manu Gómez 10'; Mikel Olcoz 77'	Stadium: Estadio Municipal

5 December 2018	**Bergantiños**	**1–0** (**2–1** agg.)	Lealtad	Carballo
17:00	Diego 22'	Report		Stadium: As Eiroas; Attendance: 150; Referee: Río Amor

5 December 2018	**Llagostera**	**1–0** (**1–0** agg.)	Peña Deportiva	Llagostera
19:00	Mario 63'	Report		Stadium: Municipal

5 December 2018	Langreo	**1–2** (**2–3** agg.)	**Pontevedra**	Langreo
20:00	Omar 58'	Report	Rivera 34'; Pibe 62'	Stadium: Ganzábal; Attendance: 410; Referee: López Abelleira

5 December 2018	**Real Unión**	**3–3** (**5–3** agg.)	Cultural Durango	Irun
20:00	Etxaburu 59', 89'; Galán 90+3'	Report	Pradera 19'; Unzueta 33'; Abasolo 84'	Stadium: Gal; Referee: Villaquirán

5 December 2018	**Mirandés**	**2–2 (a.e.t.)** (**4–4** agg.) (**4–2** p)	Arandina	Miranda de Ebro
20:00	Claudio Medina 40', 42'	Report	Pesca 35'; Asier Barahona 44'	Stadium: Anduva; Referee: Calleja Castrillo

5 December 2018	Tenerife B	**0–2** (**1–4** agg.)	**Internacional**	Santa Cruz de Tenerife
20:00		Report	Jaime Ciorciari 89', 90'	Stadium: Centro Insular; Referee: Huerta de Aza

5 December 2018	**Barakaldo**	**3–3** (**6–5** agg.)	Tropezón	Barakaldo
20:15	David Cuerva 33'; Dopi 56'; Sarkic 90+4'	Report	Fresno 17', 27'; Perujo 60'	Stadium: Lasesarre; Referee: Sánchez Asla

5 December 2018	**Talavera de la Reina**	**2–1** (**4–1** agg.)	Cacereño	Talavera de la Reina
20:45	Laerte 49'; Nandi 52'	Report	Marcos Torres 84'	Stadium: El Prado; Attendance: 450; Referee: Mora Correas

6 December 2018	**Poblense**	**2–0** (**2–1** agg.)	Ejea	Sa Pobla
12:00	Paco Plata 9' (pen.); Aitor Pons 76'	Report		Stadium: Nou Camp de Sa Pobla; Referee: Jiménez Yustos

6 December 2018	Mensajero	**2–5** (**4–6** agg.)	**Navalcarnero**	Santa Cruz de la Palma
12:00	Azael 44'; Vianney 84'	Report	Ayoub 34'; Cifo 53'; Esnaider 60'; Stevans 66'; Del Pozo 83'	Stadium: Silvestre Carrillo

6 December 2018	**Socuéllamos**	**6–1** (**9–3** agg.)	Cartagena B	Socuéllamos
12:00	Fran 27' (o.g.); Belencoso 44', 46'; Essomba 60'; Parada 72'; Toboso 87'	Report	Ismael 6'	Stadium: Paquito Jiménez; Attendance: 650; Referee: Moreno Osuna

6 December 2018	Teruel	**5–2 (a.e.t.)** (**6–6** agg.)	**Cornellà**	Teruel
12:30	Juanma 2'; Mikel Juaristi 49'; Sergio Sánchez 68'; Hamza 85'; Aspas (penalty missed) 99'; Jameli 116'	Report	Peque 52'; Jaume Pascual 92'	Stadium: Pinilla; Referee: Ferrer Collado

=== Round of 16 ===
The draw for the Round of 16 took place on 13 December 2018. Matches were played between 9 and 24 January 2019.

Team 1	Agg.	Team 2	1st leg	2nd leg
Bergantiños (4) (Galicia (Spain))	0–2	(Community of Madrid) **Internacional** (3)	0–0	0–2
**Pontevedra** (3) (Galicia (Spain))	1–1 (a)	(Community of Madrid) Navalcarnero (3)	0–0	1–1
Barakaldo (3) (Basque Country (autonomous community))	2–5	(Castile and León) **Mirandés** (3)	2–3	0–2
Peña Sport (4) (Navarre)	3–7	(Basque Country (autonomous community)) **Real Unión** (3)	3–3	0–4
Llagostera (4) (Catalonia)	2–3	(Castilla–La Mancha) **Conquense** (3)	1–1	1–2
**Cornellà** (3) (Catalonia)	3–3 (4–3 p)	(Balearic Islands) Poblense (4)	1–2	2–1 (a.e.t.)
Talavera de la Reina (3) (Castilla–La Mancha)	1–2	(Castilla–La Mancha) **Socuéllamos** (4)	1–0	0–2
Betis Deportivo (4) (Andalusia)	2–2 (4–5 p)	**Ceuta** (4)	2–0	0–2 (a.e.t.)

==== First leg ====
9 January 2019	**Llagostera**	**1–1**	**Conquense**	Llagostera
17:30	Monchi 21'	Report	Agi 81'	Stadium: Municipal

9 January 2019	**Pontevedra**	**0–0**	**Navalcarnero**	Pontevedra
18:00		Report		Stadium: Pasarón; Attendance: 413; Referee: Lois Carro

9 January 2019	**Peña Sport**	**3–3**	**Real Unión**	Tafalla
19:30	Fermín Úriz 44' (pen.); Rubio 53', 88'	Report	Javi Martínez 15'; Lizarraga 81'; Orbegozo 82'	Stadium: San Francisco; Attendance: 100; Referee: Fernández de Arcaya

9 January 2019	**Barakaldo**	**2–3**	**Mirandés**	Barakaldo
20:15	Riki 40' (o.g.); Oliver 60'	Report	Melli 2'; Matheus 9'; Miguel Díaz 87'	Stadium: Lasesarre

9 January 2019	**Talavera de la Reina**	**1–0**	**Socuéllamos**	Talavera de la Reina
20:45	Ramón 56' (o.g.)	Report		Stadium: El Prado; Attendance: 500; Referee: Caraballo Rocha

10 January 2019	**Cornellà**	**1–2**	**Poblense**	Cornellà
12:00	Miguel Fernández 49'	Report	Plomer 8'; Víctor 64'	Stadium: Nou Camp; Referee: Romero Freixas

10 January 2019	**Betis Deportivo**	**2–0**	**Ceuta**	Seville
15:45	Altamirano 27'; Irizo 34'	Report		Stadium: Luis del Sol; Referee: Camacho Garrote

10 January 2019	**Bergantiños**	**0–0**	**Internacional**	Carballo
20:00		Report		Stadium: As Eiroas; Attendance: 150; Referee: López Vila

==== Second leg ====
23 January 2019	**Conquense**	**2–1** (**3–2** agg.)	Llagostera	Cuenca
15:30	Jorge Iborra 15'; Arimany 27' (o.g.)	Report	Óscar Castellanos 90+3'	Stadium: La Fuensanta; Attendance: 210; Referee: Escribano Ortiz

23 January 2019	**Internacional**	**2–0** (**2–0** agg.)	Bergantiños	Boadilla del Monte
17:00	Muñiz 32'; Aitor Núñez 41'	Report		Stadium: Municipal Ángel Nieto; Attendance: 150; Referee: Gómez Vázquez

23 January 2019	Navalcarnero	**1–1** (**1–1** agg.)	**Pontevedra**	Navalcarnero
18:00	Astray 63'	Report	Pibe 59'	Stadium: Mariano González; Referee: Gay Vázquez

23 January 2019	Poblense	**1–2** (**3–3** agg.) (**3–4** p)	**Cornellà**	Sa Pobla
19:00	Calonge 13'	Report	Abde 20', 75'	Stadium: Nou Camp de Sa Pobla; Referee: Bestard Servera

23 January 2019	**Real Unión**	**4–0** (**7–3** agg.)	Peña Sport	Irun
19:30	Esnaola 12'; Orbegozo 28', 47'; Eizmendi 83'	Report		Stadium: Gal; Attendance: 250; Referee: Haro Marcos

23 January 2019	**Mirandés**	**2–0** (**5–2** agg.)	Barakaldo	Miranda de Ebro
20:15	Zunzunegui 81'; Miguel Díaz 85' (pen.)	Report		Stadium: Anduva; Attendance: 582; Referee: Díez Cano

23 January 2019	**Socuéllamos**	**2–0** (**2–1** agg.)	Talavera de la Reina	Socuéllamos
20:30	Borja Íñiguez 40', 87'	Report		Stadium: Paquito Jiménez; Attendance: 300; Referee: Marchante Flores

24 January 2019	**Ceuta**	**2–0** (**2–2** agg.) (**5–4** p)	Betis Deportivo	Ceuta
20:00	Jaime 22'; Prieto 81'	Report		Stadium: Alfonso Murube; Attendance: 300; Referee: Alcaraz Yáñez

=== Quarter-finals ===
The draw for the Quarter-finals took place on 25 January 2019. Matches were played between 6 and 13 February 2019.

Team 1	Agg.	Team 2	1st leg	2nd leg
**Mirandés** (3) (Castile and León)	4–4 (a)	(Basque Country (autonomous community)) Real Unión (3)	1–0	3–4
Pontevedra (3) (Galicia (Spain))	1–3	(Catalonia) **Cornellà** (3)	0–1	1–2
Ceuta (4)	0–0 (0–3 p)	(Castilla–La Mancha) **Socuéllamos** (4)	0–0	0–0 (a.e.t.)
**Internacional** (3) (Community of Madrid)	2–1	(Castilla–La Mancha) Conquense (3)	1–1	1–0

==== First leg ====
6 February 2019	**Internacional**	**1–1**	**Conquense**	Boadilla del Monte
17:00	Rufino Sánchez 15'	Report	Pablo Aguilera 81' (pen.)	Stadium: Municipal Ángel Nieto

6 February 2019	**Pontevedra**	**0–1**	**Cornellà**	Pontevedra
18:00	Javi Pazos (penalty missed) 76'	Report	Carlos 46'	Stadium: Pasarón; Attendance: 350; Referee: García Lesta

6 February 2019	**Mirandés**	**1–0**	**Real Unión**	Miranda de Ebro
19:00	Hugo Rama 24'	Report		Stadium: Anduva; Referee: Calleja Castillo

6 February 2019	**Ceuta**	**0–0**	**Socuéllamos**	Ceuta
19:00		Report		Stadium: Alfonso Murube

==== Second leg ====
13 February 2019	Conquense	**0–1** (**1–2** agg.)	**Internacional**	Cuenca
17:00		Report	Monroy 76'	Stadium: La Fuensanta; Attendance: 600; Referee: Fernández Añonuevo

13 February 2019	Real Unión	**4–3** (**4–4** agg.)	**Mirandés**	Irun
19:30	Galán 16', 71'; Etxaburu 26'; Javi Martínez 90+2'	Report	Claudio 7'; Yanis 30'; Cerrajería 56'	Stadium: Gal; Referee: Ojeda Beaumont

13 February 2019	**Socuéllamos**	**0–0** (**0–0** agg.) (**3–0** p)	Ceuta	Socuéllamos
19:30		Report		Stadium: Paquito Jiménez; Referee: Cuesta García-Muñoz

13 February 2019	**Cornellà**	**2–1** (**3–1** agg.)	Pontevedra	Cornellà
20:15	Campillo 19' (o.g.); Héctor Camps 73'	Report	Álex González 43'	Stadium: Nou Camp; Referee: Sánchez Rico

=== Semi-finals ===
The draw for the Semi-finals and Final took place on 15 February 2019. Matches were played between 27 February and 6 March 2019.

Team 1	Agg.	Team 2	1st leg	2nd leg
**Mirandés** (3) (Castile and León)	4–1	(Castilla–La Mancha) Socuéllamos (4)	3–0	1–1
Internacional (3) (Community of Madrid)	2–3	(Catalonia) **Cornellà** (3)	2–2	0–1

==== First leg ====
27 February 2019	**Internacional**	**2–2**	**Cornellà**	Boadilla del Monte
17:30	Fran Cortés 83'; Morante 85'	Report	Jaume 52', 58'	Stadium: Municipal Ángel Nieto; Attendance: 400; Referee: Morona del Campo

27 February 2019	**Mirandés**	**3–0**	**Socuéllamos**	Miranda de Ebro
18:30	Álvaro Rey 9'; Claudio Medina 38', 68'	Report		Stadium: Anduva; Referee: Cuesta Revilla

==== Second leg ====
6 March 2019	**Cornellà**	**1–0** (**3–2** agg.)	Internacional	Cornellà
15:00	Jaume 29'	Report Report2		Stadium: Nou Camp; Attendance: 500; Referee: Rodríguez Enrique

6 March 2019	Socuéllamos	**1–1** (**1–4** agg.)	**Mirandés**	Socuéllamos
19:30	Iván 90+4'	Report	Claudio Medina 67'	Stadium: Paquito Jiménez; Referee: Díaz de Mera

=== Final ===
Matches were played between 20 and 28 March 2019.

Team 1	Agg.	Team 2	1st leg	2nd leg
**Mirandés** (3) (Castile and León)	5–2	(Catalonia) Cornellà (3)	3–0	2–2

==== First leg ====
20 March 2019	**Mirandés**	**3–0**	**Cornellà**	Miranda de Ebro
20:00	Cerrajería 41'; Claudio 50'; Matheus 79'	Report		Stadium: Anduva; Attendance: 1,947; Referee: Sánchez Meneses

==== Second leg ====
28 March 2019	Cornellà	**2–2** (**2–5** agg.)	**Mirandés**	Cornellà
20:30	Carlos Esteve 74'; Eloy Gila 84'	Report RFEF Report2	Hugo Rama 30'; Jon Guridi 54'	Stadium: Nou Camp; Referee: Tarraga Lajara
