= 2018 Tercera División play-offs =

Spanish football league play-offs

The 2018 Tercera División play-offs to Segunda División B from Tercera División (Promotion play-offs) were the final playoffs for the promotion from 2017–18 Tercera División to 2018–19 Segunda División B. The first four teams in each group took part in the play-off.

== Format ==
The eighteen group winners have the opportunity to be promoted directly to Segunda División B. The eighteen group winners were drawn into a two-legged series where the nine winners will promote to Segunda División B. The nine losing clubs will enter the play-off round for the last nine promotion spots.

The eighteen runners-up were drawn against one of the eighteen fourth-placed clubs outside their group and the eighteen third-placed clubs were drawn against one another in a two-legged series. The twenty-seven winners will advance with the nine losing clubs from the champions' series to determine the eighteen teams that will enter the last two-legged series for the last nine promotion spots. In all the playoff series, the lower-ranked club play at home first. Whenever there is a tie in position (e.g. like the group winners in the champions' series or the third-placed teams in the first round), a draw determines the club to play at home first.

== Group Winners promotion play-off ==
=== Qualified teams ===
Group	Team
1	Compostela
2	Oviedo B
3	Gimnástica Torrelavega
4	Cultural Durango
5	Espanyol B
6	Atlético Levante
7	Internacional
8	Unionistas
9	Atlético Malagueño

Group	Team
10	Cádiz B
11	Mallorca B
12	Tenerife B
13	Yeclano
14	Don Benito
15	Mutilvera
16	Calahorra
17	Teruel
18	Conquense

=== Matches ===
Team 1	Agg.	Team 2	1st leg	2nd leg
Calahorra	2–2 (5–3 p)	Atlético Levante	1–2	2–1 (a.e.t.)
Internacional	1–1 (a)	Tenerife B	0–0	1–1
Unionistas	0–1	Don Benito	0–0	0–1
Mutilvera	1–5	Oviedo B	0–2	1–3
Gimnástica Torrelavega	6–3	Mallorca B	4–1	2–2
Compostela	2–4	Espanyol B	0–0	2–4
Cádiz B	0–1	Teruel	0–1	0–0
Cultural Durango	1–1 (a)	Conquense	1–1	0–0
Atlético Malagueño	1–1 (a)	Yeclano	0–0	1–1

Promoted to Segunda División B
Atlético Malagueño (11 years later)	Calahorra (14 years later)	Conquense (3 years later)	Don Benito (13 years later)	Espanyol B (One year later)	Gimnástica Torrelavega (5 years later)	Internacional (First time ever)	Oviedo B (16 years later)	Teruel (5 years later)

== Non-champions promotion play-off ==
=== First round ===
The teams that finished fourth in their groups are drawn against teams that finished in second place, with the latter hosting the second leg. The teams that finished third in their groups are drawn against each other.

==== Qualified teams ====
Group	Pos.	Team
1	2nd	Bergantiños
2	2nd	Langreo
3	2nd	Escobedo
4	2nd	Portugalete
5	2nd	Sant Andreu
6	2nd	Castellón
7	2nd	Getafe B
8	2nd	Arandina
9	2nd	Almería B
10	2nd	Ceuta
11	2nd	Poblense
12	2nd	Mensajero
13	2nd	Mar Menor
14	2nd	Cacereño
15	2nd	San Juan
16	2nd	SD Logroñés
17	2nd	Borja
18	2nd	Villarrobledo

Group	Pos.	Team
1	3rd	Racing Villalbés
2	3rd	Marino Luanco
3	3rd	Laredo
4	3rd	Alavés B
5	3rd	L'Hospitalet
6	3rd	Orihuela
7	3rd	Rayo Vallecano B
8	3rd	Cristo Atlético
9	3rd	Jaén
10	3rd	Algeciras
11	3rd	Ibiza
12	3rd	San Fernando
13	3rd	Atlético Pulpileño
14	3rd	Plasencia
15	4th (Note: In Group 15, Iruña was ranked 3rd but was ineligible as reserve team of Osasuna, whose first reserve team, Osasuna B was relegated from Segunda División B.)	Burladés
16	3rd	Náxara
17	3rd	Ejea
18	3rd	Socuéllamos

Group	Pos.	Team
1	4th	Alondras
2	4th	Llanes
3	4th	Tropezón
4	4th	Sestao River
5	4th	Terrassa
6	4th	La Nucía
7	4th	Alcalá
8	4th	Salmantino
9	4th	Antequera
10	4th	Atlético Sanluqueño
11	4th	Felanitx
12	4th	Lanzarote
13	4th	Churra
14	4th	Coria
15	5th	Cirbonero
16	4th	Haro
17	4th	Tarazona
18	4th	Villarrubia

==== Matches ====
Team 1	Agg.	Team 2	1st leg	2nd leg
Tropezón	2–5	Castellón	1–1	1–4
Felanitx	0–3	Ceuta	0–1	0–2
Lanzarote	1–3	Villarrobledo	1–1	0–2
Alcalá	4–2	San Juan	1–0	3–2
Salmantino	5–4	Poblense	2–2	3–2
Churra	0–1	Cacereño	0–0	0–1 (a.e.t.)
Llanes	0–3	Portugalete	0–0	0–3
La Nucía	6–6 (a)	Escobedo	5–3	1–3
Coria	1–4	Getafe B	1–2	0–2
Alondras	3–5	Langreo	0–3	3–2 (a.e.t.)
Antequera	0–2	Sant Andreu	0–1	0–1
Sestao River	1–2	Arandina	1–0	0–2 (a.e.t.)
Cirbonero	2–2 (a)	Bergantiños	1–0	1–2
Terrassa	3–0	Mar Menor	1–0	2–0
Villarrubia	2–7	Almería B	1–4	1–3
Haro	4–5	Borja	3–2	1–3
Atlético Sanluqueño	2–0	Mensajero	1–0	1–0
Tarazona	4–2	SD Logroñés	3–1	1–1
Algeciras	1–3	Ibiza	0–1	1–2
L'Hospitalet	0–3	Náxara	0–0	0–3
Cristo Atlético	1–3	Orihuela	0–1	1–2
San Fernando	3–2	Marino Luanco	3–1	0–1
Jaén	1–3	Socuéllamos	1–1	0–2
Laredo	4–6	Alavés B	3–2	1–4
Ejea	2–1	Rayo Vallecano B	2–0	0–1
Racing Villalbés	0–0 (4–2 p)	Atlético Pulpileño	0–0	0–0 (a.e.t.)
Burladés	1–7	Plasencia	1–2	0–5

=== Second round ===
The nine losers of the Group Winners promotion play-off plus the twenty-seven winners of the Non-champions promotion play-off first round will take part in this round. The teams will be matched by drawing of lots, subject to the fact that those who obtained the best position in the league face those who got worse, disputing the first match in the sports facilities of the latter and avoiding wherever it is possible that they compete among themselves clubs from the same group.

==== Qualified teams ====
Group	Pos.	Team
1	1st	Compostela
4	1st	Cultural Durango
6	1st	Atlético Levante
8	1st	Unionistas
10	1st	Cádiz B
11	1st	Mallorca B
12	1st	Tenerife B
13	1st	Yeclano
15	1st	Mutilvera

Group	Pos.	Team
2	2nd	Langreo
3	2nd	Escobedo
4	2nd	Portugalete
5	2nd	Sant Andreu
6	2nd	Castellón
7	2nd	Getafe B
8	2nd	Arandina
9	2nd	Almería B
10	2nd	Ceuta
14	2nd	Cacereño
17	2nd	Borja
18	2nd	Villarrobledo

Group	Pos.	Team
1	3rd	Racing Villalbés
4	3rd	Alavés B
6	3rd	Orihuela
11	3rd	Ibiza
12	3rd	San Fernando
14	3rd	Plasencia
16	3rd	Náxara
17	3rd	Ejea
18	3rd	Socuéllamos

Group	Pos.	Team
5	4th	Terrassa
7	4th	Alcalá
8	4th	Salmantino
10	4th	Atlético Sanluqueño
15	5th	Cirbonero
17	4th	Tarazona

==== Matches ====
Team 1	Agg.	Team 2	1st leg	2nd leg
Alcalá	1–3	Cultural Durango	1–1	0–2
Terrassa	2–3	Compostela	2–0	0–3
Salmantino	3–2	Mutilvera	1–1	2–1
Tarazona	4–5	Unionistas	4–3	0–2
Atlético Sanluqueño	2–2 (a)	Mallorca B	1–0	1–2 (a.e.t.)
Cirbonero	1–3	Yeclano	1–2	0–1
Ejea	4–1	Tenerife B	2–0	2–1
Racing Villalbés	1–2	Atlético Levante	1–1	0–1
Alavés B	2–5	Cádiz B	0–2	2–3
Plasencia	2–3	Portugalete	1–2	1–1
Ibiza	1–0	Getafe B	0–0	1–0
Orihuela	2–2 (5–4 p)	Ceuta	1–1	1–1 (a.e.t.)
San Fernando	1–0	Borja	1–0	0–0
Náxara	2–6	Langreo	2–1	0–5
Socuéllamos	5–0	Cacereño	1–0	4–0
Castellón	1–1 (a)	Sant Andreu	0–0	1–1
Escobedo	1–4	Villarrobledo	0–3	1–1
Arandina	2–3	Almería B	0–0	2–3

=== Third round ===
The eighteen winners of the previous qualifying round will be matched by drawing of lots, subject to the fact that those who obtained the best position in the league face those who got worse, disputing the first match in the sports facilities of the latter and avoiding wherever it is possible that they compete among themselves clubs from the same group.

==== Qualified teams ====
Group	Pos.	Team
1	1st	Compostela
4	1st	Cultural Durango
6	1st	Atlético Levante
8	1st	Unionistas
10	1st	Cádiz B
13	1st	Yeclano

Group	Pos.	Team
2	2nd	Langreo
4	2nd	Portugalete
6	2nd	Castellón
9	2nd	Almería B
18	2nd	Villarrobledo

Group	Pos.	Team
6	3rd	Orihuela
11	3rd	Ibiza
12	3rd	San Fernando
17	3rd	Ejea
18	3rd	Socuéllamos

Group	Pos.	Team
8	4th	Salmantino
10	4th	Atlético Sanluqueño

==== Matches ====
Team 1	Agg.	Team 2	1st leg	2nd leg
Atlético Sanluqueño	6–2	Yeclano	3–0	3–2
Salmantino	2–1	Compostela	1–1	1–0
San Fernando	0–3	Cultural Durango	0–1	0–2
Ibiza	1–1 (3–4 p)	Atlético Levante	1–0	0–1 (a.e.t.)
Socuéllamos	2–3	Unionistas	1–0	1–3
Ejea	3–3 (a)	Cádiz B	1–1	2–2
Orihuela	2–2 (a)	Langreo	2–1	0–1
Portugalete	1–2	Castellón	1–1	0–1
Villarrobledo	3–8	Almería B	3–6	0–2

Promoted to Segunda División B
Almería B (2 years later)	Atlético Levante (One year later)	Atlético Sanluqueño (One year later)	Castellón (7 years later)	Cultural Durango (12 years later)	Ejea (First time ever)	Langreo (3 years later)	Salmantino (First time ever)	Unionistas (First time ever)

== See also ==
- 2018 Segunda División play-offs
- 2018 Segunda División B play-offs
