= Adrián Turmo =

Spanish footballer

Personal information
- Full name: Adrián Turmo Jodar
- Date of birth: 24 January 2001 (age 25)
- Place of birth: Palma, Spain
- Height: 1.75 m (5 ft 9 in)
- Position: Forward

Team information
- Current team: Ejea
- Number: 23

Youth career
- Cide
- 2018–2019: Penya Arrabal
- 2019–2020: Girona

Senior career*
Years	Team	Apps	(Gls)
2020–2021	Girona B	13	(1)
2020	Girona	1	(0)
2021–2022	Don Benito	29	(3)
2022–2023	Córdoba B	25	(2)
2023–2024	Covadonga	25	(2)
2024–2025	Andratx	13	(0)
2025	Llanera	13	(2)
2025–	Ejea	25	(3)
- * Club domestic league appearances and goals as of 14 May 2026

Adrián Turmo Jodar (born 24 January 2001) is a Spanish professional footballer who plays as a forward for Segunda Federación club Ejea.

== Club career ==
Born in Palma, Mallorca, Balearic Islands, Turmo joined Girona FC's youth setup in July 2019, from AD Penya Arrabal. In the following year, he was promoted to the reserves and renewed his contract until 2022.

Turmo made his first team debut on 4 October 2020, coming on as a late substitute for Jairo Izquierdo in a 0–1 Segunda División home loss against CF Fuenlabrada. He scored his first senior goal fourteen days later, netting the third for the B's in a 3–0 Tercera División away win against UE Figueres.
