= 2017–18 Tercera División =

Tercera División
- Season: 2017–18
- Biggest home win: Anguiano 9–0 Yagüe (22 October 2017)
- Biggest away win: Pradejón 0–8 Calahorra (18 March 2018)
- Highest scoring: La Bañeza 8–2 Real Burgos (27 August 2017); San José 5–5 Cebrereña (28 October 2017); Txantrea 7–3 Subiza (24 February 2018)
- Highest attendance: 15,000; Castellón 1–0 Portugalete (24 June 2018)

The 2017–18 Tercera División was the fourth tier in Spanish football. It began play in August 2017 and ended in late June 2018 with the promotion play-off finals.

== Competition format ==
- The top four eligible teams in each group will play the promotion playoffs.
- The champion of each group will qualify to 2018–19 Copa del Rey. If the champion is a reserve team, the first non-reserve team qualified will join the Copa.
- In each group, at least three teams will be relegated to Regional Divisions.

== Group 1 – Galicia ==
=== Teams ===
Location of teams of the 2017–18 Tercera División Group 1

Team	City	Home ground
Alondras	Cangas	O Morrazo
Arenteiro	O Carballiño	Espiñedo
Arosa	Vilagarcía de Arousa	A Lomba
Barbadás	Barbadás	Os Carrís
Barco	O Barco de Valdeorras	Calabagueiros
Bergantiños	Carballo	As Eiroas
Boiro	Boiro	Barraña
Céltiga	A Illa de Arousa	Salvador Otero
Choco	Redondela	Santa Mariña
Compostela	Santiago de Compostela	San Lázaro
Cultural Areas	Ponteareas	A Lomba
Laracha	A Laracha	Municipal
Negreira	Negreira	Jesús García Calvo
Noia	Noia	San Lázaro
Ourense CF	Ourense	O Couto
Racing Villalbés	Vilalba	A Magdalena
Ribadumia	Ribadumia	A Senra
Silva	A Coruña	A Grela
Somozas	As Somozas	Pardiñas
Villalonga	Vilalonga, Sanxenxo	San Pedro

=== League table ===
Pos	Team	Pld	W	D	L	GF	GA	GD	Pts	Qualification or relegation
1	Compostela	38	27	5	6	78	34	+44	86	Qualification to group champions' playoffs
2	Bergantiños	38	25	5	8	77	29	+48	80	Qualification to promotion playoffs
3	Racing Vilalbés	38	21	8	9	60	30	+30	71	Qualification to promotion playoffs
4	Alondras	38	20	9	9	61	34	+27	69	Qualification to promotion playoffs
5	Arosa	38	17	16	5	65	34	+31	67	
6	Somozas	38	18	9	11	63	42	+21	63 (Note: Somozas finished ahead of Barco on head-to-head goal difference: Somozas–Barco 2–0, Barco–Somozas 1–2)	
7	Barco	38	19	6	13	63	44	+19	63	
8	Choco	38	17	8	13	50	44	+6	59	
9	Ourense CF	38	15	13	10	48	36	+12	58 (Note: Ourense CF finished ahead of Boiro on head-to-head goal difference: Ourense CF–Boiro 0–1, Boiro–Ourense CF 1–3)	
10	Boiro	38	18	4	16	52	53	−1	58	
11	Silva	38	16	7	15	45	46	−1	55	
12	Ribadumia	38	12	11	15	44	55	−11	47	
13	Céltiga	38	13	5	20	32	57	−25	44	
14	Arenteiro	38	12	6	20	39	61	−22	42	
15	Laracha	38	11	8	19	35	44	−9	41	
16	Cultural Areas (Note: Relegated due to the relegations of regional teams from Segunda División B.) (R)	38	9	7	22	48	82	−34	34	Relegation to Preferente Autonómica
17	Noia (R)	38	8	8	22	42	72	−30	32 (Note: Noia finished ahead of Barbadás on head-to-head points: Noia–Barbadás 2–0, Barbadás–Noia 0–4)	Relegation to Preferente Autonómica
18	Barbadás (R)	38	8	8	22	29	61	−32	32	Relegation to Preferente Autonómica
19	Negreira (R)	38	7	10	21	31	63	−32	31	Relegation to Preferente Autonómica
20	Villalonga (R)	38	6	9	23	28	69	−41	27	Relegation to Preferente Autonómica

Source: Futbolme
Rules for classification: 1) points; 2) head-to-head points; 3) head-to-head goal difference; 4) goal difference; 5) number of goals scored; 6) fair-play points; 7) playoff match
(R) Relegated
Notes:

Top goalscorers

Goalscorers	Goals	Team
(Spain) Javi Pazos	25	Arosa
(Spain) Primo	20	Compostela
(Spain) Rubén Rivera	19	Bergantiños
(Spain) Yelco Alfaya	16	Cultural Areas
(Spain) Gerardo Carrera	15	Somozas

Top goalkeeper

Goalkeeper	Goals	Matches	Average	Team
(Spain) Cristopher Pallás	28	36	0.78	Bergantiños

== Group 2 – Asturias ==
=== Teams ===
Location of the 2017–18 Tercera División Group 2
Teams in Gijón: Ceares, Gijón Industrial, Roces
Teams in Oviedo: Covadonga, Oviedo B

Team	City	Home ground
Atlético Lugones	Lugones, Siero	Santa Bárbara
Avilés	Avilés	Román Suárez Puerta
Ceares	Gijón	La Cruz
Colunga	Colunga	Santianes
Condal	Noreña	Alejandro Ortea
Covadonga	Oviedo	Juan Antonio Álvarez Rabanal
Gijón Industrial	Gijón	Santa Cruz
L'Entregu	El Entrego, San Martín del Rey Aurelio	Nuevo Nalón
Langreo	La Felguera, Langreo	Ganzábal
Llanera	Llanera	Pepe Quimarán
Llanes	Llanes	San José
Marino Luanco	Luanco, Gozón	Miramar
Mosconia	Grado	Marqués de la Vega de Anzo
Oviedo B	Oviedo	El Requexón
Praviano	Pravia	Santa Catalina
Roces	Gijón	Covadonga
San Martín	Sotrondio, San Martín del Rey Aurelio	El Florán
Siero	Pola de Siero, Siero	El Bayu
Valdesoto	Valdesoto, Siero	Villarea
Tuilla	Tuilla, Langreo	El Candín

=== League table ===
Pos	Team	Pld	W	D	L	GF	GA	GD	Pts	Qualification or relegation
1	Oviedo B (O, P)	38	24	10	4	73	19	+54	82	Qualification to group champions' playoffs
2	Langreo (O, P)	38	22	12	4	89	23	+66	78	Qualification to promotion playoffs
3	Marino Luanco	38	21	13	4	70	21	+49	76	Qualification to promotion playoffs
4	Llanes	38	24	3	11	65	48	+17	75	Qualification to promotion playoffs
5	Covadonga	38	21	9	8	83	46	+37	72	
6	Ceares	38	15	15	8	46	30	+16	60	
7	Tuilla	38	15	14	9	60	41	+19	59	
8	Praviano	38	15	13	10	45	37	+8	58	
9	L'Entregu	38	14	11	13	53	50	+3	53	
10	San Martín	38	12	15	11	41	50	−9	51	
11	Mosconia	38	14	8	16	39	57	−18	50	
12	Gijón Industrial	38	13	8	17	52	55	−3	47	
13	Colunga (Note: 3 points docked by not playing their match against Langreo, due to problems with the kit colors. Langreo was given the match by 3–0. Finally, the match was played on 30 June 2018, after finishing the season, and Langreo won it by 8–0.)	38	12	9	17	44	60	−16	45	
14	Condal	38	11	11	16	39	67	−28	44	
15	Llanera	38	9	12	17	48	65	−17	39	
16	Siero	38	9	9	20	34	70	−36	36	
17	Avilés	38	8	8	22	35	64	−29	32	
18	Valdesoto (R)	38	7	9	22	27	55	−28	30	Relegation to Regional Preferente
19	Atlético Lugones (R)	38	7	7	24	22	68	−46	28	Relegation to Regional Preferente
20	Roces (R)	38	6	6	26	29	68	−39	24	Relegation to Regional Preferente

Source: Futbolme
Rules for classification: 1) points; 2) head-to-head points; 3) head-to-head goal difference; 4) goal difference; 5) number of goals scored; 6) fair-play points; 7) playoff match
(O) Play-off winners; (P) Promoted; (R) Relegated
Notes:

Top goalscorers

Goalscorers	Goals	Team
(Spain) Cris Montes	24	Langreo
(Spain) Cristian García	23	Tuilla
(Spain) Steven Prieto	21	Oviedo B
(Spain) Marcos Iglesias	18	Covadonga
(Spain) Edu Font	17	Covadonga

Top goalkeeper

Goalkeeper	Goals	Matches	Average	Team
(Spain) Adrián Torre	19	33	0.58	Langreo

== Group 3 – Cantabria ==
=== Teams ===
Location of teams of the 2017–18 Tercera División Group III
Teams in Santander: Rayo Cantabria, Racing Santander B, Atlético Albericia
Teams in Torrelavega: Barreda, Gimnástica Torrelavega, Tropezón

Team	City	Home ground
Atlético Albericia	Santander	Juan Hormaechea
Barreda	Barreda, Torrelavega	Solvay
Bezana	Santa Cruz de Bezana	Municipal
Castro	Castro Urdiales	Mioño
Cayón	Sarón, Santa María de Cayón	Fernando Astobiza
Escobedo	Escobedo, Camargo	Eusebio Arce
Gimnástica Torrelavega	Torrelavega	El Malecón
Guarnizo	Guarnizo, El Astillero	El Pilar
Laredo	Laredo	San Lorenzo
Racing Santander B	Santander	La Albericia
Rayo Cantabria	Santander	Mies de Cozada
Sámano	Sámano, Castro Urdiales	Vallegón
Santillana	Santillana del Mar	Carlos Alonso González
Selaya	Selaya	El Castañal
Siete Villas	Castillo, Arnuero	San Pedro
Solares-Medio Cudeyo	Solares, Medio Cudeyo	La Estación
Textil Escudo	Cabezón de la Sal	Municipal
Tropezón	Tanos, Torrelavega	Santa Ana
Velarde	Muriedas, Camargo	La Maruca
Vimenor	Vioño de Piélagos, Piélagos	La Vidriera

=== League table ===
Pos	Team	Pld	W	D	L	GF	GA	GD	Pts	Qualification or relegation
1	Gimnástica Torrelavega (O, P)	38	27	10	1	83	21	+62	91	Qualification to group champions' playoffs
2	Escobedo	38	26	8	4	80	30	+50	86	Qualification to promotion playoffs
3	Laredo	38	25	7	6	63	29	+34	82	Qualification to promotion playoffs
4	Tropezón	38	23	12	3	71	26	+45	81	Qualification to promotion playoffs
5	Racing Santander B	38	24	5	9	75	39	+36	77	
6	Cayón	38	20	8	10	61	35	+26	68	
7	Sámano	38	16	10	12	58	61	−3	58	
8	Textil Escudo	38	15	7	16	51	53	−2	52	
9	Barreda	38	13	10	15	49	57	−8	49	
10	Atlético Albericia	38	12	9	17	47	63	−16	45	
11	Rayo Cantabria (Note: Relegated at the end of the season due to non-payments.) (R)	38	11	11	16	52	59	−7	44	Relegation to Regional Preferente
12	Siete Villas	38	11	8	19	46	56	−10	41 (Note: Siete Villas finished ahead of Guarnizo on head-to-head goal difference: Guarnizo–Siete Villas 2–1, Siete Villas–Guarnizo 3–1)	
13	Guarnizo	38	12	5	21	48	60	−12	41	
14	Velarde	38	9	13	16	29	47	−18	40	
15	Vimenor	38	10	9	19	37	51	−14	39	
16	Bezana	38	10	8	20	38	61	−23	38	
17	Solares-Medio Cudeyo	38	10	7	21	37	62	−25	37	
18	Selaya (R)	38	8	12	18	30	52	−22	36	Relegation to Regional Preferente
19	Santillana (R)	38	4	12	22	29	73	−44	24	Relegation to Regional Preferente
20	Castro (R)	38	5	7	26	27	77	−50	22	Relegation to Regional Preferente

Rules for classification: 1) points; 2) head-to-head points; 3) head-to-head goal difference; 4) goal difference; 5) number of goals scored; 6) fair-play points; 7) playoff match
(O) Play-off winners; (P) Promoted; (R) Relegated
Notes:

Top goalscorers

Goalscorers	Goals	Team
(Spain) Nacho Rodríguez	22	Gimnástica Torrelavega
(Spain) Miguel Zorrilla	22	Sámano
(Spain) Dani Álvarez	18	Escobedo
(Spain) Héctor Marcos	16	Escobedo
(Spain) Alberto Dorronsoro	16	Tropezón

Top goalkeeper

Goalkeeper	Goals	Matches	Average	Team
(France) Álex Ruiz	13	29	0.45	Gimnástica Torrelavega

== Group 4 – Basque Country ==
=== Teams ===
Location of teams of the 2017–18 Tercera División Group IV
Teams in Bilbao: Deusto, Santutxu
Teams in Vitoria-Gasteiz: Alavés B, Aurrerá Vitoria

Team	City	Home ground
Alavés B	Vitoria-Gasteiz	Ibaia
Amurrio	Amurrio	Basarte
Anaitasuna	Azkoitia	Txerloia
Aurrerá Vitoria	Vitoria-Gasteiz	Olaranbe
Balmaseda	Balmaseda	La Baluga
Basconia	Basauri	López Cortázar
Beasain	Beasain	Loinaz
Bermeo	Bermeo	Itxas Gane
Cultural Durango	Durango	Tabira
Deusto	Bilbao	Etxezuri
Getxo	Getxo	Fadura
Lagun Onak	Azpeitia	Garmendipe
Portugalete	Portugalete	La Florida
Real Sociedad C	San Sebastián	Berio
Santurtzi	Santurtzi	San Jorge
Santutxu	Bilbao	Maiona
Sestao River	Sestao	Las Llanas
Sodupe	Güeñes	Lorenzo Hurtado de Saratxo
Somorrostro	Muskiz	El Malecón
Tolosa	Tolosa	Berazubi
Zamudio	Zamudio	Gazituaga

=== League table ===
Pos	Team	Pld	W	D	L	GF	GA	GD	Pts	Qualification or relegation
1	Cultural Durango (O, P)	38	23	8	7	62	36	+26	77	Qualification to group champions' playoffs
2	Portugalete	38	21	8	9	63	29	+34	71	Qualification to promotion playoffs
3	Alavés B	38	17	14	7	55	27	+28	65	Qualification to promotion playoffs
4	Sestao River	38	17	13	8	55	30	+25	64	Qualification to promotion playoffs
5	Beasain	38	17	10	11	50	33	+17	61 (Note: Beasain finished ahead of Real Sociedad C on overall goal difference)	
6	Real Sociedad C	38	16	13	9	48	48	0	61	
7	Somorrostro	38	14	16	8	59	43	+16	58	
8	Deusto	38	15	12	11	40	37	+3	57	
9	Balmaseda	38	14	12	12	42	43	−1	54	
10	Sodupe	38	13	12	13	33	41	−8	51	
11	Lagun Onak	38	12	14	12	44	49	−5	50	
12	Zamudio	38	13	10	15	44	49	−5	49	
13	Santutxu	38	13	8	17	33	45	−12	47	
14	Santurtzi	38	12	10	16	41	46	−5	46	
15	Basconia	38	10	13	15	49	46	+3	43 (Note: Basconia finished ahead of Amurrio on head-to-head points: Basconia–Amurrio 0–0, Amurrio–Basconia 0–3)	
16	Amurrio	38	10	13	15	38	46	−8	43	
17	Bermeo	38	9	12	17	31	52	−21	39	
18	Anaitasuna (R)	38	8	14	16	32	47	−15	38	Relegation to Regional leagues
19	Getxo (R)	38	7	10	21	23	49	−26	31	Relegation to Regional leagues
20	Aurrerá Vitoria (R)	38	3	10	25	30	76	−46	19	Relegation to Regional leagues

Rules for classification: 1) points; 2) head-to-head points; 3) head-to-head goal difference; 4) goal difference; 5) number of goals scored; 6) fair-play points; 7) playoff match
(O) Play-off winners; (P) Promoted; (R) Relegated
Notes:

Top goalscorers

Goalscorers	Goals	Team
(Spain) Ekain Zenitagoia	20	Durango
(Spain) Gabri Ortega	17	Portugalete
(Spain) Íñigo Orozco	14	Sestao River
(Spain) Iker Garmendia	14	Real Sociedad C
(Spain) Endika Sanz	14	Santurtzi

Top goalkeeper

Goalkeeper	Goals	Matches	Average	Team
(Spain) Rubén Lavín	28	35	0.8	Sestao River

== Group 5 – Catalonia ==
=== Teams ===
Location of teams of the 2017–18 Tercera División Group 5
Location of teams of the 2017–18 Tercera División Group 5 in the province of Barcelona

Team	City	Home ground
Ascó	Ascó	Municipal
Castelldefels	Castelldefels	El Canyar
Cerdanyola del Vallès	Cerdanyola del Vallès	La Bòbila-Pinetons
Espanyol B	Barcelona	Dani Jarque
Europa	Barcelona	Nou Sardenya
Figueres	Figueres	Vilatenim
Granollers	Granollers	Carrer Girona
Horta	Barcelona	Feliu i Codina
L'Hospitalet	L'Hospitalet de Llobregat	La Feixa Llarga
Palamós	Palamós	Palamós Costa Brava
Gavà	Gavà	La Bòbila
Pobla de Mafumet	La Pobla de Mafumet	Municipal
Prat	El Prat de Llobregat	Sagnier
Reus B	Cambrils	Municipal
Sant Andreu	Barcelona	Narcís Sala
Santboià	Sant Boi de Llobregat	Joan Baptista Milà
Santfeliuenc	Sant Feliu de Llobregat	Les Grases
Terrassa	Terrassa	Olímpic
Vilafranca	Vilafranca del Penedès	Municipal
Vilassar de Mar	Vilassar de Mar	Xevi Remón

=== League table ===
Pos	Team	Pld	W	D	L	GF	GA	GD	Pts	Qualification or relegation
1	Espanyol B (O, P)	38	27	9	2	74	25	+49	90	Qualification to group champions' playoffs
2	Sant Andreu	38	19	14	5	61	24	+37	71 (Note: Sant Andreu finished ahead of L'Hospitalet on head-to-head points: L'Hospitalet–Sant Andreu 1–2, Sant Andreu–L'Hospitalet 3–0)	Qualification to promotion playoffs
3	L'Hospitalet	38	21	8	9	61	31	+30	71	Qualification to promotion playoffs
4	Terrassa	38	17	13	8	60	38	+22	64	Qualification to promotion playoffs
5	Prat	38	18	9	11	57	35	+22	63 (Note: Prat finished ahead of Pobla de Mafumet on head-to-head goal difference: Pobla de Mafumet–Prat 0–2, Prat–Pobla de Mafumet 0–1)	
6	Pobla de Mafumet	38	17	12	9	40	25	+15	63	
7	Ascó	38	15	15	8	47	41	+6	60	
8	Europa	38	15	13	10	48	46	+2	58	
9	Vilafranca	38	16	6	16	48	42	+6	54	
10	Figueres	38	15	8	15	47	43	+4	53	
11	Horta	38	14	8	16	47	52	−5	50	
12	Cerdanyola del Vallès	38	13	9	16	35	43	−8	48 (Note: Cerdanyola del Vallès finished ahead of Santboià on head-to-head points: Santboià–Cerdanyola del Vallès 1–2, Cerdanyola del Vallès–Santboià 2–0)	
13	Santboià	38	11	15	12	35	37	−2	48	
14	Reus B	38	12	11	15	40	50	−10	47	
15	Santfeliuenc	38	12	10	16	43	42	+1	46	
16	Castelldefels	38	11	11	16	40	46	−6	44	
17	Granollers	38	11	5	22	32	54	−22	38	
18	Palamós (R)	38	7	10	21	38	64	−26	31	Relegation to Primera Catalana
19	Gavà (R)	38	4	9	25	28	87	−59	21	Relegation to Primera Catalana
20	Vilassar de Mar (R)	38	3	9	26	24	80	−56	18	Relegation to Primera Catalana

Source: Futbolme
Rules for classification: 1) points; 2) head-to-head points; 3) head-to-head goal difference; 4) goal difference; 5) number of goals scored; 6) fair-play points; 7) playoff match
(O) Play-off winners; (P) Promoted; (R) Relegated
Notes:

Top goalscorers

Goalscorers	Goals	Team
(Uruguay) Pedro Manzi	17	L'Hospitalet
(Spain) Manuel Raíllo	14	Europa
(Spain) Sergi Arranz	14	Horta
(Spain) Alejandro Poves	13	Prat
(Mauritania) Cheick Saad	13	Ascó

Top goalkeeper

Goalkeeper	Goals	Matches	Average	Team
(Spain) José Perales	19	30	0.63	Pobla de Mafumet

== Group 6 – Valencian Community ==
=== Teams ===
Location of teams of the 2017–18 Tercera División Group 6

Team	City	Home ground
Almazora	Almassora	José Manuel Pesudo
Alzira	Alzira	Luis Suñer Picó
Atlético Levante	Valencia	Ciudad Deportiva
Buñol	Buñol	Beltrán Báguena
Castellón	Castellón de la Plana	Castalia
Crevillente	Crevillent	Enrique Miralles
Borriol	Borriol	El Palmar
Elche Ilicitano	Elche	José Díaz Iborra
Eldense	Elda	Nuevo Pepico Amat
La Nucía	La Nucia	Camilo Cano
Novelda	Novelda	La Magdalena
Olímpic	Xàtiva	La Murta
Orihuela	Orihuela	Los Arcos
Paiporta	Paiporta	El Palleter
Paterna	Paterna	Gerardo Salvador
Rayo Ibense	Ibi	Francisco Vilaplana Mariel
Recambios Colón	Catarroja	Sedaví
Roda	Castellón de la Plana	Pamesa Cerámica
Silla	Silla	Vicente Morera
Torre Levante	Valencia	Orriols
Villarreal C	Villarreal	Pamesa Cerámica

=== League table ===
Pos	Team	Pld	W	D	L	GF	GA	GD	Pts	Qualification or relegation
1	Atlético Levante (O, P)	40	24	12	4	72	31	+41	84	Qualification to group champions' playoffs
2	Castellón (O, P)	40	24	11	5	64	32	+32	83	Qualification to promotion playoffs
3	Orihuela	40	23	9	8	62	28	+34	78	Qualification to promotion playoffs
4	La Nucía	40	19	14	7	67	34	+33	71	Qualification to promotion playoffs
5	Eldense	40	20	10	10	54	40	+14	70	
6	Torre Levante	40	19	12	9	48	27	+21	69	
7	Olímpic	40	15	15	10	39	32	+7	60	
8	Villarreal C	40	14	14	12	53	55	−2	56	
9	Alzira	40	12	15	13	42	46	−4	51 (Note: Alzira finished ahead of Novelda and Roda on head-to-head points: Alzira 8 pts Novelda 5 pts, Roda 2 pts)	
10	Novelda	40	12	15	13	37	42	−5	51	
11	Roda	40	14	9	17	45	45	0	51	
12	Crevillente	40	12	12	16	35	46	−11	48	
13	Paterna	40	10	17	13	40	47	−7	47	
14	Silla	40	12	10	18	47	46	+1	46	
15	Rayo Ibense	40	10	14	16	32	47	−15	44	
16	Elche Ilicitano	40	9	16	15	38	45	−7	43 (Note: Elche Ilicitano finished ahead of Paiporta on overall goal difference)	
17	Paiporta	40	10	13	17	42	63	−21	43	
18	Almazora (R)	40	12	6	22	32	64	−32	42	Relegation to Regional Preferente
19	Buñol (R)	40	9	12	19	32	42	−10	39	Relegation to Regional Preferente
20	Borriol (R)	40	5	12	23	34	69	−35	27	Relegation to Regional Preferente
21	Recambios Colón (R)	40	3	16	21	32	66	−34	25	Relegation to Regional Preferente

Rules for classification: 1) points; 2) head-to-head points; 3) head-to-head goal difference; 4) goal difference; 5) number of goals scored; 6) fair-play points; 7) playoff match
(O) Play-off winners; (P) Promoted; (R) Relegated
Notes:

Top goalscorers

Goalscorers	Goals	Team
(Spain) David Cubillas	20	Castellón
(Spain) Cristian Herrera	20	Castellón
(Spain) Diego Piquero	20	La Nucía
(Spain) Villa	18	Villarreal C
(Spain) Antonio Martínez	16	Orihuela

Top goalkeeper

Goalkeeper	Goals	Matches	Average	Team
(Spain) Emilio Romero	24	36	0.67	Orihuela

== Group 7 – Community of Madrid ==
=== Teams ===
Location of teams of the 2017–18 Tercera División Group 7
Teams in Alcorcón: Alcorcón B, Trival Valderas

Team	City	Home ground
Alcalá	Alcalá de Henares	Municipal del Val
Alcobendas Sport	Alcobendas	Luis Aragonés
Alcorcón B	Alcorcón	Anexo de Santo Domingo
Colmenar Viejo	Colmenar Viejo	Alberto Ruiz
Atlético Pinto	Pinto	Amelia del Castillo
El Álamo	El Álamo	Facundo Rivas
Getafe B	Getafe	Ciudad Deportiva
Internacional	Boadilla del Monte	Polideportivo Municipal
Leganés B	Leganés	Anexo de Butarque
Los Yébenes San Bruno	Madrid	Eustaquio Casallo
Móstoles URJC	Móstoles	El Soto
Parla Escuela	Parla	Las Américas
Pozuelo de Alarcón	Pozuelo de Alarcón	Valle de las Cañas
Rayo Vallecano B	Madrid	Ciudad Deportiva
San Agustín del Guadalix	San Agustín del Guadalix	Municipal
San Fernando de Henares	San Fernando de Henares	Santiago del Pino
Santa Ana	Madrid	Santa Ana
Tres Cantos	Tres Cantos	La Foresta
Trival Valderas	Alcorcón	La Canaleja
Villaverde San Andrés	Madrid	Boetticher

=== League table ===
Pos	Team	Pld	W	D	L	GF	GA	GD	Pts	Qualification or relegation
1	Internacional (O, P)	38	23	10	5	62	21	+41	79	Qualification to group champions' playoffs
2	Getafe B	38	23	9	6	67	31	+36	78	Qualification to promotion playoffs
3	Rayo Vallecano B	38	22	8	8	63	31	+32	74	Qualification to promotion playoffs
4	Alcalá	38	21	9	8	63	32	+31	72	Qualification to promotion playoffs
5	Pozuelo de Alarcón	38	18	11	9	46	37	+9	65	
6	San Fernando de Henares	38	18	9	11	58	41	+17	63 (Note: San Fernando de Henares finished ahead of Alcobendas Sport on head-to-head goal difference: San Fernando de Henares–Alcobendas Sport 0–1, Alcobendas Sport–San Fernando de Henares 1–4)	
7	Alcobendas Sport	38	18	9	11	59	38	+21	63	
8	Móstoles URJC	38	16	13	9	56	41	+15	61	
9	Alcorcón B	38	15	12	11	65	43	+22	57	
10	Trival Valderas	38	12	16	10	46	41	+5	52	
11	Villaverde San Andrés	38	11	16	11	34	32	+2	49 (Note: Villaverde San Andrés finished ahead of Leganés B on head-to-head points: Villaverde San Andrés–Leganés B 1–1, Leganés B–Villaverde San Andrés 0–1)	
12	Leganés B	38	14	7	17	61	67	−6	49	
13	Atlético Pinto	38	13	8	17	34	43	−9	47	
14	San Agustín del Guadalix	38	10	15	13	43	54	−11	45	
15	Santa Ana	38	11	10	17	40	52	−12	43 (Note: Santa Ana finished ahead of Tres Cantos on head-to-head points: Santa Ana–Tres Cantos 0–0, Tres Cantos–Santa Ana 1–3)	
16	Tres Cantos	38	12	7	19	37	65	−28	43	
17	Los Yébenes San Bruno (R)	38	8	9	21	26	63	−37	33	Relegation to Preferente
18	El Álamo (R)	38	7	11	20	31	55	−24	32	Relegation to Preferente
19	Colmenar Viejo (R)	38	7	9	22	45	72	−27	30	Relegation to Preferente
20	Parla Escuela (R)	38	0	4	34	16	93	−77	4	Relegation to Preferente

Rules for classification: 1) points; 2) head-to-head points; 3) head-to-head goal difference; 4) goal difference; 5) number of goals scored; 6) fair-play points; 7) playoff match
(O) Play-off winners; (P) Promoted; (R) Relegated
Notes:

Top goalscorers

Goalscorers	Goals	Team
(Spain) Ian González	20	Móstoles URJC
(Spain) Gabri Salazar	18	Leganés B
(Spain) Álvaro Portero	15	Santa Ana
(Spain) Alvar Herrero	14	Internacional
(Spain) Álvaro Castiella	14	Alcalá

Top goalkeeper

Goalkeeper	Goals	Matches	Average	Team
(Spain) Miguel Ángel Trenado	17	32	0.53	Internacional

== Group 8 – Castile and León ==
=== Teams ===
Location of teams of the 2017–18 Tercera División Group 8
Teams in Burgos: Bupolsa, Burgos Promesas, Real Burgos

Team	City	Home ground
Almazán	Almazán	La Arboleda
Arandina	Aranda de Duero	El Montecillo
Atlético Astorga	Astorga	La Eragudina
Atlético Bembibre	Bembibre	La Devesa
Atlético Tordesillas	Tordesillas	Las Salinas
Ávila	Ávila	Adolfo Suárez
Becerril	Becerril de Campos	Mariano Haro
Bupolsa	Burgos	San Amaro
Burgos Promesas	Burgos	Castañares
Cebrereña	Cebreros	El Mancho
Cristo Atlético	Palencia	Nueva Balastera
La Bañeza	La Bañeza	La Llanera
La Virgen del Camino	La Virgen del Camino	Los Dominicos
Numancia B	Soria	Francisco Rubio
Real Burgos	Burgos	San Amaro
Salmantino	Salamanca	Helmántico
San José	Garray	San Juan
Sporting Uxama	El Burgo de Osma	Municipal
Unionistas	Salamanca	Pistas del Helmántico
Zamora	Zamora	Ruta de la Plata

=== League table ===
Pos	Team	Pld	W	D	L	GF	GA	GD	Pts	Qualification or relegation
1	Unionistas (O, P)	38	25	5	8	72	34	+38	80	Qualification to group champions' playoffs
2	Arandina	38	24	5	9	79	26	+53	77	Qualification to promotion playoffs
3	Cristo Atlético	38	22	8	8	69	38	+31	74 (Note: Cristo Atlético finished ahead of Salmantino on head-to-head points: Salmantino–Cristo Atlético 0–1, Cristo Atlético–Salmantino 1–1)	Qualification to promotion playoffs
4	Salmantino (O, P)	38	22	8	8	74	35	+39	74	Qualification to promotion playoffs
5	Atlético Astorga	38	20	13	5	66	34	+32	73	
6	Atlético Tordesillas	38	21	9	8	66	40	+26	72	
7	La Bañeza	38	21	5	12	53	52	+1	68	
8	Numancia B	38	18	12	8	55	30	+25	66	
9	Zamora	38	15	13	10	51	41	+10	58	
10	Ávila	38	12	16	10	50	49	+1	52	
11	La Virgen del Camino	38	10	12	16	41	54	−13	42 (Note: La Virgen del Camino finished ahead of Cebrereña on head-to-head goal difference: Cebrereña–La Virgen del Camino 2–1, La Virgen del Camino–Cebrereña 2–0)	
12	Cebrereña	38	11	9	18	55	66	−11	42	
13	Atlético Bembibre	38	10	8	20	40	61	−21	38 (Note: Atlético Bembibre finished ahead of Almazán on head-to-head points: Almazán–Atlético Bembibre 1–1, Atlético Bembibre–Almazán 2–1)	
14	Almazán	38	8	14	16	38	51	−13	38	
15	Bupolsa	38	7	16	15	44	56	−12	37	
16	Burgos Promesas	38	8	11	19	38	61	−23	35	
17	Sporting Uxama	38	6	15	17	39	61	−22	33	
18	Real Burgos (R)	38	8	8	22	31	82	−51	32 (Note: Real Burgos finished ahead of Becerril on head-to-head points: Real Burgos–Becerril 1–1, Becerril–Real Burgos 0–2)	Relegation to Primera Regional
19	Becerril (R)	38	9	5	24	42	73	−31	32	Relegation to Primera Regional
20	San José (R)	38	4	6	28	26	85	−59	18	Relegation to Primera Regional

Rules for classification: 1) points; 2) head-to-head points; 3) head-to-head goal difference; 4) goal difference; 5) number of goals scored; 6) fair-play points; 7) playoff match
(O) Play-off winners; (P) Promoted; (R) Relegated
Notes:

Top goalscorers

Goalscorers	Goals	Team
(Spain) David Terleira	23	Cebrereña
(Spain) Guti	21	Bupolsa
(Spain) Roberto Puente	19	Atlético Astorga
(Spain) Cristo Medina	18	Unionistas
(Spain) Murci	16	Salmantino

Top goalkeeper

Goalkeeper	Goals	Matches	Average	Team
(Spain) Pablo Carmona	19	30	0.63	Arandina

== Group 9 – Eastern Andalusia and Melilla ==
=== Teams ===
Location of teams of the 2017–18 Tercera División Group 9
Teams in Málaga: Atlético Malagueño, El Palo

Team	City	Home ground
Almería B	Almería	Juan Rojas
Antequera	Antequera	El Maulí
Atarfe Industrial	Atarfe	Municipal
Atlético Malagueño	Málaga	El Viso
Atlético Mancha Real	Mancha Real	La Juventud
Ciudad de Torredonjimeno	Torredonjimeno	Matías Prats
El Palo	Málaga	San Ignacio
Guadix	Guadix	Municipal
Huétor Tájar	Huétor-Tájar	Miguel Moranto
Huétor Vega	Huétor Vega	Las Viñas
Jaén	Jaén	La Victoria
Juventud Torremolinos	Torremolinos	El Pozuelo
Linares	Linares	Linarejos
Loja	Loja	Medina Lauxa
Maracena	Maracena	Ciudad Deportiva
Martos	Martos	Ciudad de Martos
Melistar	Melilla	La Espiguera
Motril	Motril	Escribano Castilla
Rincón	Rincón de la Victoria	Francisco Romero
San Pedro	San Pedro de Alcántara	Municipal
Vélez	Vélez-Málaga	Vivar Téllez
Villacarrillo	Villacarrillo	Veracruz

=== League table ===
Pos	Team	Pld	W	D	L	GF	GA	GD	Pts	Qualification or relegation
1	Atlético Malagueño (O, P)	42	30	6	6	95	31	+64	96	Qualification to group champions' playoffs
2	Almería B (O, P)	42	26	8	8	97	35	+62	86	Qualification to promotion playoffs
3	Jaén	42	25	7	10	58	29	+29	82 (Note: Jaén finished ahead of Antequera and Huétor Tájar on head-to-head points: Jaén 9 pts, Antequera 7 pts, Huétor Tájar 1 pt)	Qualification to promotion playoffs
4	Antequera	42	24	10	8	78	37	+41	82	Qualification to promotion playoffs
5	Huétor Tájar	42	25	7	10	77	49	+28	82	
6	Motril	42	25	6	11	85	56	+29	81	
7	Linares	42	23	5	14	68	47	+21	74	
8	Atlético Mancha Real	42	21	9	12	66	46	+20	72	
9	Loja	42	20	9	13	87	63	+24	69	
10	El Palo	42	19	10	13	66	50	+16	67 (Note: El Palo finished ahead of Ciudad de Torredonjimeno on head-to-head points: Ciudad de Torredonjimeno–El Palo 2–2, El Palo–Ciudad de Torredonjimeno 3–1)	
11	Ciudad de Torredonjimeno	42	19	10	13	79	65	+14	67	
12	Vélez	42	16	8	18	60	65	−5	56	
13	Rincón	42	15	7	20	53	61	−8	52	
14	Juventud Torremolinos	42	15	5	22	64	76	−12	50	
15	Martos	42	14	5	23	58	85	−27	47	
16	Atarfe Industrial	42	10	13	19	46	69	−23	43 (Note: Atarfe Industrial finished ahead of San Pedro on head-to-head points: San Pedro–Atarfe Industrial 0–0, Atarfe Industrial–San Pedro 2–0)	
17	San Pedro	42	12	7	23	43	80	−37	43	
18	Huétor Vega	42	9	11	22	47	74	−27	38	
19	Guadix	42	9	10	23	40	77	−37	37	
20	Maracena (R)	42	8	11	23	44	73	−29	35	Relegation to División de Honor
21	Villacarrillo (R)	42	7	7	28	44	79	−35	28	Relegation to División de Honor
22	Melistar (R)	42	3	3	36	24	132	−108	12	Relegation to División de Honor

Rules for classification: 1) points; 2) head-to-head points; 3) head-to-head goal difference; 4) goal difference; 5) number of goals scored; 6) fair-play points; 7) playoff match
(O) Play-off winners; (P) Promoted; (R) Relegated
Notes:

Top goalscorers

Goalscorers	Goals	Team
(Spain) Joan Grasa	28	Motril
(Spain) Antonio López	27	Loja
(Spain) José María Carrillo	24	Ciudad de Torredonjimeno
(Spain) Juan Carlos González	24	Ciudad de Torredonjimeno
(Spain) Fefo	21	Loja

Top goalkeeper

Goalkeeper	Goals	Matches	Average	Team
(Spain) Luisma Tovar	35	40	0.88	Antequera

== Group 10 – Western Andalusia and Ceuta ==
=== Teams ===
Location of teams of the 2017–18 Tercera División Group 10

Team	City	Home ground
Alcalá	Alcalá de Guadaira	Nuevo Estadio
Algeciras	Algeciras	Nuevo Mirador
Arcos	Arcos de la Frontera	Antonio Barbadillo
Atlético Espeleño	Espiel	Municipal
Atlético Onubense	Huelva	Ciudad Deportiva
Atlético Sanluqueño	Sanlúcar de Barrameda	El Palmar
Cabecense	Las Cabezas de San Juan	Carlos Marchena
Cádiz B	Cádiz	Puntales
Castilleja	Castilleja de la Cuesta	Municipal
Ceuta	Ceuta	Alfonso Murube
Ciudad de Lucena	Lucena	Ciudad Deportiva
Gerena	Gerena	José Juan Romero Gil
Guadalcacín	Jerez de la Frontera	Municipal
Lebrijana	Lebrija	Polideportivo Municipal
Los Barrios	Los Barrios	San Rafael
San Fermín	Puente Genil	Manuel Polinario
San Roque de Lepe	Lepe	Ciudad de Lepe
Sevilla C	Seville	José Ramón Cisneros
Utrera	Utrera	San Juan Bosco
Xerez	Jerez de la Frontera	Chapín

=== League table ===
Pos	Team	Pld	W	D	L	GF	GA	GD	Pts	Qualification or relegation
1	Cádiz B	38	20	15	3	49	19	+30	75	Qualification to group champions' playoffs
2	Ceuta	38	21	11	6	54	24	+30	74	Qualification to promotion playoffs
3	Algeciras	38	18	12	8	55	31	+24	66	Qualification to promotion playoffs
4	Atlético Sanluqueño (O, P)	38	17	13	8	51	27	+24	64	Qualification to promotion playoffs
5	Lebrijana	38	15	14	9	50	37	+13	59 (Note: Lebrijana finished ahead of Sevilla C on head-to-head points: Sevilla C–Lebrijana 1–4, Lebrijana–Sevilla C 3–3)	
6	Sevilla C	38	16	11	11	62	48	+14	59	
7	Gerena	38	16	9	13	50	39	+11	57	
8	San Fermín	38	13	14	11	47	44	+3	53	
9	Cabecense	38	12	12	14	41	45	−4	48	
10	Ciudad de Lucena	38	12	11	15	60	65	−5	47	
11	San Roque de Lepe	38	12	9	17	50	60	−10	45 (Note: San Roque de Lepe finished ahead of Atlético Espeleño, Utrera, and Guadalcacín on head-to-head points: San Roque de Lepe 10 pts, Atlético Espeleño 8 pts, Utrera 7 pts, Guadalcacín 4 pts)	
12	Atlético Espeleño	38	12	9	17	53	65	−12	45	
13	Utrera	38	11	12	15	38	43	−5	45	
14	Guadalcacín	38	9	18	11	38	46	−8	45	
15	Arcos	38	11	11	16	43	57	−14	44	
16	Xerez	38	12	7	19	50	66	−16	43 (Note: Xerez finished ahead of Los Barrios on head-to-head points: Los Barrios–Xerez 0–3, Xerez–Los Barrios 0–1)	
17	Los Barrios	38	9	16	13	38	44	−6	43	
18	Atlético Onubense (R)	38	11	8	19	42	54	−12	41 (Note: Atlético Onubense is ahead of Alcalá on head-to-head goal difference: Atlético Onubense–Alcalá 0–1, Alcalá–Atlético Onubense 1–3)	Relegation to División de Honor
19	Alcalá (R)	38	12	5	21	33	61	−28	41	Relegation to División de Honor
20	Castilleja (R)	38	9	7	22	41	70	−29	34	Relegation to División de Honor

Rules for classification: 1) points; 2) head-to-head points; 3) head-to-head goal difference; 4) goal difference; 5) number of goals scored; 6) fair-play points; 7) playoff match
(O) Play-off winners; (P) Promoted; (R) Relegated
Notes:

Top goalscorers

Goalscorers	Goals	Team
(Spain) David Camps	19	Ceuta
(Spain) Chico Díaz	19	Lebrijana
(Spain) Pedro Carrión	18	Xerez
(Spain) Manu Vallejo	16	Cádiz B
(Spain) Javier Henares	15	Ciudad de Lucena

Top goalkeeper

Goalkeeper	Goals	Matches	Average	Team
(Spain) David Gil	17	36	0.47	Cádiz B

== Group 11 – Balearic Islands ==
=== Teams ===
Location of teams of the 2017–18 Tercera División Group 11
Teams in Palma: Collerense, Mallorca B, Santa Catalina Atlético, Son Cladera

Team	City	Home ground
Alcúdia	Alcúdia	Els Arcs
Binissalem	Binissalem	Miquel Pons
Collerense	Palma	Ca'n Caimari
Constància	Inca	Municipal
Esporles	Esporles	Son Quint
Felanitx	Felanitx	Es Torrentó
Ferriolense	Son Ferriol	Municipal
Ibiza	Ibiza	Can Misses
Llosetense	Lloseta	Municipal
Mallorca B	Palma	Son Bibiloni
Manacor	Manacor	Na Capellera
Mercadal	Es Mercadal	San Martí
Platges de Calvià	Calvià	Municipal de Magaluf
Petra	Petra	Na Capitana
Poblense	Sa Pobla	Nou Camp
Sant Rafel	Sant Rafel	Municipal
Santa Catalina Atlético	Palma	Son Flo
Santanyí	Santanyí	Municipal
Serverense	Son Servera	Ses Eres
Son Cladera	Palma	Son Cladera

=== League table ===
Pos	Team	Pld	W	D	L	GF	GA	GD	Pts	Qualification or relegation
1	Mallorca B	38	30	3	5	87	20	+67	93	Qualification to group champions' playoffs
2	Poblense	38	29	2	7	101	30	+71	89	Qualification to promotion playoffs
3	Ibiza (Note: Promoted to Segunda División B after Lorca FC was demoted from the Segunda División.) (P)	38	27	7	4	91	17	+74	88	Qualification to promotion playoffs
4	Felanitx	38	21	6	11	59	41	+18	69	Qualification to promotion playoffs
5	Platges de Calvià	38	16	10	12	51	47	+4	58 (Note: Platges de Calvià finished ahead of Binissalem and Alcúdia on head-to-head points: Platges de Calvià 8 pts, Binissalem 5 pts, Alcúdia 2 pts)	
6	Binissalem	38	16	10	12	46	49	−3	58	
7	Alcúdia	38	17	7	14	42	49	−7	58	
8	Constància	38	16	8	14	56	43	+13	56	
9	Santa Catalina Atlético	38	13	10	15	51	51	0	49	
10	Son Cladera	38	14	6	18	36	47	−11	48 (Note: Son Cladera finished ahead of Esporles and Manacor on head-to-head points: Son Cladera 12 pts, Esporles 3 pts, Manacor 3 pts. Esporles finished ahead of Manacor on head-to-head goal difference: Manacor–Esporles 2–1, Esporles–Manacor 2–0)	
11	Esporles	38	14	6	18	36	47	−11	48	
12	Manacor	38	14	6	18	36	52	−16	48	
13	Sant Rafel	38	12	9	17	44	60	−16	45	
14	Ferriolense	38	12	8	18	42	60	−18	44	
15	Llosetense	38	11	10	17	40	68	−28	43 (Note: Llosetense finished ahead of Mercadal on head-to-head points: Mercadal–Llosetense 0–2, Llosetense–Mercadal 3–2)	
16	Mercadal	38	13	4	21	43	62	−19	43	
17	Santanyí	38	10	10	18	46	65	−19	40	
18	Collerense (R)	38	10	9	19	43	67	−24	39	Relegation to Primera Regional Preferente
19	Serverense (R)	38	10	5	23	42	65	−23	35	Relegation to Primera Regional Preferente
20	Petra (R)	38	3	8	27	21	73	−52	17	Relegation to Primera Regional Preferente

Rules for classification: 1) points; 2) head-to-head points; 3) head-to-head goal difference; 4) goal difference; 5) number of goals scored; 6) fair-play points; 7) playoff match
(P) Promoted; (R) Relegated
Notes:

Top goalscorers

Goalscorers	Goals	Team
(Spain) Aitor Pons	32	Poblense
(Spain) Ángel Rodado	28	Mallorca B
(Spain) Sergio Cirio	27	Ibiza
(Spain) Rubio	24	Santa Catalina Atlético
(Spain) Nico Rubio	23	Felanitx

Top goalkeeper

Goalkeeper	Goals	Matches	Average	Team
(Spain) Mateu Fullana	30	32	0.94	Felanitx

== Group 12 – Canary Islands ==
=== Teams ===
Location of teams of the 2017–18 Tercera División Group 12

Team	City	Home ground
Atlético Unión de Güímar	Güímar	Tasagaya
Buzanada	Buzanada, Arona	Clementina de Bello
El Cotillo	La Oliva	Municipal
Estrella	Santa Lucía de Tirajana	Las Palmitas
Haría	Haría	Ladislao Rodríguez Bonilla
Ibarra	Las Galletas, Arona	Villa Isabel
Lanzarote	Arrecife	Ciudad Deportiva
Las Palmas C	Las Palmas	Anexo Gran Canaria
Las Zocas	San Miguel de Abona	Juanito Marrero
Los Llanos de Aridane	Los Llanos de Aridane	Aceró
Marino	Los Cristianos, Arona	Antonio Domínguez
Mensajero	Santa Cruz de La Palma	Silvestre Carrillo
Panadería Pulido	Vega de San Mateo	San Mateo
Santa Úrsula	Santa Úrsula	Argelio Tabares
Tenerife B	Santa Cruz de Tenerife	Ciudad Deportiva Geneto
Tenisca	Santa Cruz de La Palma	Virgen de las Nieves
La Cuadra-Unión Puerto	Puerto del Rosario	Municipal de Los Pozos
UD San Fernando	San Bartolomé de Tirajana	Ciudad Deportiva
Unión Sur Yaiza	Yaiza	Municipal
Vera	Puerto de la Cruz	Salvador Ledesma
Villa de Santa Brígida	Santa Brígida	El Guiniguada

=== League table ===
Pos	Team	Pld	W	D	L	GF	GA	GD	Pts	Qualification or relegation
1	Tenerife B	40	25	10	5	71	20	+51	85	Qualification to group champions' playoffs
2	Mensajero	40	24	7	9	77	36	+41	79	Qualification to promotion playoffs
3	UD San Fernando	40	23	8	9	85	40	+45	77	Qualification to promotion playoffs
4	Lanzarote	40	21	10	9	75	43	+32	73	Qualification to promotion playoffs
5	Ibarra	40	20	11	9	68	41	+27	71	
6	Las Palmas C	40	19	9	12	63	44	+19	66	
7	Santa Úrsula	40	18	10	12	69	63	+6	64	
8	Villa de Santa Brígida	40	16	12	12	61	56	+5	60	
9	Las Zocas	40	16	11	13	52	55	−3	59 (Note: Las Zocas finished ahead of Unión Sur Yaiza on head-to-head points: Las Zocas–Unión Sur Yaiza 2–1, Unión Sur Yaiza–Las Zocas 1–1)	
10	Unión Sur Yaiza	40	16	11	13	42	50	−8	59	
11	Tenisca	40	15	9	16	58	57	+1	54	
12	Panadería Pulido	40	14	11	15	65	64	+1	53	
13	Marino	40	13	11	16	48	50	−2	50	
14	Atlético Unión de Güímar	40	11	15	14	55	65	−10	48	
15	Buzanada	40	13	7	20	44	58	−14	46	
16	El Cotillo	40	11	11	18	38	60	−22	44	
17	La Cuadra-Unión Puerto	40	10	11	19	28	53	−25	41	
18	Vera (R)	40	9	11	20	45	61	−16	38 (Note: Vera finished ahead of Estrella on head-to-head points: Vera–Estrella 2–0, Estrellla–Vera 0–3)	Relegation to Interinsular Preferente
19	Estrella (R)	40	9	11	20	32	68	−36	38	Relegation to Interinsular Preferente
20	Los Llanos de Aridane (R)	40	8	7	25	40	78	−38	31	Relegation to Interinsular Preferente
21	Haría (R)	40	4	7	29	29	83	−54	19	Relegation to Interinsular Preferente

Rules for classification: 1) points; 2) head-to-head points; 3) head-to-head goal difference; 4) goal difference; 5) number of goals scored; 6) fair-play points; 7) playoff match
(R) Relegated
Notes:

Top goalscorers

Goalscorers	Goals	Team
(Spain) Yeray Pérez	27	Mensajero
(Spain) Aday López	26	UD San Fernando
(Spain) Dani López	23	Mensajero
(Spain) Giovanni Rodríguez	18	Tenerife B
(Spain) Álex Yunes	18	Unión Sur Yaiza

Top goalkeeper

Goalkeeper	Goals	Matches	Average	Team
(Spain) Ángel Galván	15	33	0.45	Tenerife B

== Group 13 – Region of Murcia ==
=== Teams ===
Location of teams of the 2017–18 Tercera División Group 13
Teams in Murcia: Los Garres, Murcia Imperial

Team	City	Home ground
Águilas	Águilas	El Rubial
Atlético Pulpileño	Pulpí	San Miguel
Bala Azul	Mazarrón	Playa Sol
Cartagena B	Cartagena	Cartagonova
Cieza	Cieza	La Arboleja
Churra	Churra, Murcia	Municipal
Deportiva Minera	Llano del Beal, Cartagena	Ángel Cedrán
El Palmar	El Palmar, Murcia	Municipal
Estudiantes	Alcantarilla	Ángel Sornichero
Huércal-Overa	Huércal-Overa	El Hornillo
La Unión	La Unión	Municipal
Lorca FC B	La Hoya, Lorca	Los Tollos
Los Garres	Murcia	Las Tejeras
Mar Menor	San Javier	Pitín
Minerva	Alumbres, Cartagena	El Secante
Muleño	Mula	Municipal
Murcia Imperial	Murcia	Campus Universitario
Pinatar	San Pedro del Pinatar	José Antonio Pérez
UCAM Murcia B	Sangonera la Verde	El Mayayo
Yeclano	Yecla	La Constitución

=== League table ===
Pos	Team	Pld	W	D	L	GF	GA	GD	Pts	Qualification or relegation
1	Yeclano	38	22	9	7	81	38	+43	75	Qualification to group champions' playoffs
2	Mar Menor	38	19	11	8	59	39	+20	68	Qualification to promotion playoffs
3	Atlético Pulpileño	38	20	7	11	58	34	+24	67	Qualification to promotion playoffs
4	Churra	38	17	12	9	57	40	+17	63	Qualification to promotion playoffs
5	Minerva	38	16	14	8	63	46	+17	62	
6	Pinatar (Note: Pinatar resigned from Tercera División at the end of the season.) (R)	38	16	10	12	52	47	+5	58	Relegation to Preferente Autonómica
7	Águilas	38	14	14	10	48	44	+4	56	
8	Cartagena B	38	15	10	13	49	51	−2	55	
9	Estudiantes	38	15	9	14	53	54	−1	54	
10	UCAM Murcia B	38	15	8	15	50	51	−1	53	
11	Muleño	38	13	13	12	43	46	−3	52	
12	Deportiva Minera	38	12	11	15	48	50	−2	47 (Note: Deportiva Minera finished ahead of Lorca FC B on head-to-head points: Lorca FC B–Deportiva Minera 2–2, Deportiva Minera–Lorca FC B 2–1)	
13	Lorca FC B (Note: Since first team Lorca was demoted to the Tercera División, reserve team Lorca B was automatically relegated to the Preferente Autonómica.) (R)	38	12	11	15	51	48	+3	47	Relegation to Preferente Autonómica
14	Huércal-Overa	38	11	13	14	53	57	−4	46 (Note: Huércal-Overa finished ahead of Cieza on head-to-head goal difference: Cieza–Huércal-Overa 2–0, Huércal-Overa–Cieza 3–0)	
15	Cieza	38	13	7	18	41	53	−12	46	
16	Murcia Imperial	38	12	9	17	50	57	−7	45	
17	Los Garres	38	9	17	12	55	60	−5	44	
18	La Unión (Note: Avoided relegation after buying Pinatar's place.)	38	10	12	16	43	53	−10	42	
19	El Palmar (R)	38	11	7	20	52	65	−13	40	Relegation to Preferente Autonómica
20	Bala Azul (R)	38	3	6	29	30	105	−75	15	Relegation to Preferente Autonómica

Rules for classification: 1) points; 2) head-to-head points; 3) head-to-head goal difference; 4) goal difference; 5) number of goals scored; 6) fair-play points; 7) playoff match
(R) Relegated
Notes:

Top goalscorers

Goalscorers	Goals	Team
(Spain) Iker Torre	24	Yeclano
(Spain) Nacho López	19	Churra
(Spain) Juan Belencoso	18	Mar Menor
(Spain) Joaquín Sánchez	18	El Palmar Estrella Grana
(Spain) Fran Cortés	16	Minerva

Top goalkeeper

Goalkeeper	Goals	Matches	Average	Team
(Spain) Miguel Serna	31	33	0.94	Yeclano

== Group 14 – Extremadura ==
=== Teams ===
Location of teams of the 2017–18 Tercera División Group 14
Teams in Cáceres: Cacereño, Diocesano

Team	City	Home ground
Aceuchal	Aceuchal	Municipal
Amanecer	Sierra de Fuentes	San Isidro
Arroyo	Arroyo de la Luz	Municipal
Atlético Pueblonuevo	Pueblonuevo del Guadiana	Antonio Amaya
Azuaga	Azuaga	Municipal
Cacereño	Cáceres	Príncipe Felipe
Calamonte	Calamonte	Municipal
Castuera	Castuera	Manuel Ruiz
Coria	Coria	La Isla
Diocesano	Cáceres	Campos de la Federación
Don Benito	Don Benito	Vicente Sanz
Extremadura B	Almendralejo	Tomás de la Hera
Jerez	Jerez de los Caballeros	Manuel Calzado Galván
Montijo	Montijo	Municipal
Moralo	Navalmoral de la Mata	Municipal
Olivenza	Olivenza	Municipal
Plasencia	Plasencia	Ciudad Deportiva
Santa Amalia	Santa Amalia	Municipal
Trujillo	Trujillo	Municipal
Valdivia	Valdivia, Villanueva de la Serena	Primero de Mayo

=== League table ===
Pos	Team	Pld	W	D	L	GF	GA	GD	Pts	Qualification or relegation
1	Don Benito (O, P)	38	28	5	5	68	18	+50	89	Qualification to group champions' playoffs
2	Cacereño	38	27	6	5	62	20	+42	87	Qualification to promotion playoffs
3	Plasencia	38	27	5	6	75	29	+46	86	Qualification to promotion playoffs
4	Coria	38	23	10	5	73	23	+50	79 (Note: Coria finished ahead of Moralo on head-to-head goal difference: Moralo–Coria 0–4, Coria–Moralo 0–1)	Qualification to promotion playoffs
5	Moralo	38	24	7	7	74	30	+44	79	
6	Jerez	38	18	9	11	72	50	+22	63	
7	Diocesano	38	15	7	16	48	53	−5	52	
8	Azuaga	38	14	9	15	46	44	+2	51	
9	Calamonte	38	11	14	13	44	47	−3	47	
10	Montijo	38	13	6	19	34	55	−21	45	
11	Aceuchal	38	13	4	21	44	55	−11	43	
12	Castuera	38	10	12	16	48	70	−22	42	
13	Extremadura B	38	11	8	19	52	60	−8	41	
14	Olivenza	38	9	12	17	38	58	−20	39 (Note: Olivenza finished ahead of Valdivia and Atlético Pueblonuevo on head-to-head points: Olivenza 8 pts, Valdivia 6 pts, Atlético Pueblonuevo 2 pts)	
15	Valdivia	38	10	9	19	23	42	−19	39	
16	Atlético Pueblonuevo	38	9	12	17	41	61	−20	39	
17	Arroyo	38	10	7	21	34	63	−29	37	
18	Amanecer (R)	38	9	8	21	37	57	−20	35	Relegation to Regional Preferente
19	Trujillo (R)	38	8	10	20	32	64	−32	34	Relegation to Regional Preferente
20	Santa Amalia (R)	38	7	9	22	38	75	−37	30	Relegation to Regional Preferente

Rules for classification: 1) points; 2) head-to-head points; 3) head-to-head goal difference; 4) goal difference; 5) number of goals scored; 6) fair-play points; 7) playoff match
(O) Play-off winners; (P) Promoted; (R) Relegated
Notes:

Top goalscorers

Goalscorers	Goals	Team
(Spain) Luismi Álvarez	21	Plasencia
(Spain) Juanito de la Cruz	18	Jerez
(Spain) Rafa Carvajal	17	Aceuchal
(Spain) Javi Martín	17	Atlético Pueblonuevo
(Spain) Rulo	15	Moralo

Top goalkeeper

Goalkeeper	Goals	Matches	Average	Team
(Spain) Sebas Gil	17	37	0.46	Don Benito

== Group 15 – Navarre ==
=== Teams ===
Location of teams of the 2017–18 Tercera División Group 15
Teams in Pamplona: Txantrea, Iruña, Oberena, Pamplona, San Juan

Team	City	Home ground
Ardoi	Zizur Mayor	El Pinar
Atlético Cirbonero	Cintruénigo	San Juan
Baztán	Baztán	Giltxaurdi
Beti Kozkor	Lekunberri	Plazaola
Burladés	Burlada	Ripagaina
Cantolagua	Sangüesa	Cantolagua
Corellano	Corella	José Luis de Arrese
Cortes	Cortes	San Francisco Javier
Gares	Puente La Reina	Osabidea
Huarte	Huarte	Areta
Idoya	Oteiza	Iturtxipia
Iruña	Pamplona	Orkoien
Mutilvera	Aranguren	Valle Aranguren
Oberena	Pamplona	Oberena
Pamplona	Pamplona	Bidezarra
River Ega	Andosilla	Andola
San Juan	Pamplona	San Juan
Subiza	Subiza	Sotoburu
Txantrea	Pamplona	Txantrea
Valle de Egüés	Egüés	Sarriguren

=== League table ===
Pos	Team	Pld	W	D	L	GF	GA	GD	Pts	Qualification or relegation
1	Mutilvera	38	28	6	4	77	25	+52	90	Qualification to group champions' playoffs
2	San Juan	38	21	11	6	52	22	+30	74	Qualification to promotion playoffs
3	Iruña (Note: Because Iruña is an affiliated club to Osasuna and Osasuna B was relegated from Segunda División B, Iruña could not play the promotion playoffs and was relegated.) (R)	38	21	10	7	59	28	+31	73	Relegation to Regional Preferente
4	Burladés	38	18	11	9	51	28	+23	65	Qualification to promotion playoffs
5	Atlético Cirbonero	38	17	12	9	58	39	+19	63	Qualification to promotion playoffs
6	Pamplona	38	15	9	14	44	41	+3	54	
7	Txantrea	38	12	17	9	50	41	+9	53	
8	Ardoi	38	16	3	19	51	57	−6	51	
9	Cortes	38	14	8	16	36	39	−3	50	
10	Beti Kozkor	38	11	16	11	40	45	−5	49	
11	Valle de Egüés	38	12	12	14	48	48	0	48	
12	Baztán	38	13	8	17	50	68	−18	47	
13	Subiza	38	11	13	14	53	57	−4	46 (Note: Subiza finished ahead of Cantolagua on head-to-head points: Subiza–Cantolagua 5–1, Cantolagua–Subiza 2–2)	
14	Cantolagua	38	13	7	18	41	56	−15	46	
15	Huarte	38	10	15	13	39	47	−8	45	
16	Corellano	38	10	13	15	36	53	−17	43 (Note: Corellano finished ahead of Oberena on head-to-head points: Corellano–Oberena 2–0, Oberena–Corellano 0–1)	
17	Oberena (Note: Relegated due to the relegations of regional teams from Segunda División B.) (R)	38	12	7	19	37	56	−19	43	Relegation to Regional Preferente
18	Idoya (R)	38	7	11	20	37	61	−24	32 (Note: Idoya finished ahead of River Ega on head-to-head points: Idoya–River Ega 4–3, River Ega–Idoya 1–1)	Relegation to Regional Preferente
19	River Ega (R)	38	7	11	20	45	67	−22	32	Relegation to Regional Preferente
20	Gares (R)	38	7	10	21	28	54	−26	31	Relegation to Regional Preferente

Rules for classification: 1) points; 2) head-to-head points; 3) head-to-head goal difference; 4) goal difference; 5) number of goals scored; 6) fair-play points; 7) playoff match
(R) Relegated
Notes:

Top goalscorers

Goalscorers	Goals	Team
(Spain) Dani Ederra	23	Mutilvera
(Spain) Joseba Alcuaz	22	Txantrea
(Spain) Marcos Mendes	20	Valle de Egüés
(Spain) Adrián Alfonso	16	Mutilvera
(Spain) Isaac Sanz	16	Corellano

Top goalkeeper

Goalkeeper	Goals	Matches	Average	Team
(Spain) Guillermo Munárriz	23	32	0.72	Mutilvera

== Group 16 – La Rioja ==
=== Teams ===
Location of teams of the 2017–18 Tercera División Group 16
Teams in Logroño: Berceo, Calasancio, SD Logroñés, UD Logroñés Promesas, Varea, Villegas, Yagüe

Team	City	Home ground
Agoncillo	Agoncillo	San Roque
Alfaro	Alfaro	La Molineta
Anguiano	Anguiano	Isla
Arnedo	Arnedo	Sendero
Atlético Vianés	Viana	Municipal
Berceo	Logroño	La Isla
Calahorra	Calahorra	La Planilla
Calasancio	Logroño	La Estrella
Casalarreina	Casalarreina	El Soto
Haro	Haro	El Mazo
Náxara	Nájera	La Salera
Oyonesa	Oyón	El Espinar
Pradejón	Pradejón	Municipal
River Ebro	Rincón de Soto	San Miguel
SD Logroñés	Logroño	Las Gaunas
Tedeón	Navarrete	San Miguel
UD Logroñés Promesas	Logroño	Mundial 82
Varea	Logroño	Municipal
Villegas	Logroño	La Ribera
Yagüe	Logroño	El Salvador

=== League table ===
Pos	Team	Pld	W	D	L	GF	GA	GD	Pts	Qualification or relegation
1	Calahorra (O, P)	38	33	5	0	131	11	+120	104	Qualification to group champions' playoffs
2	SD Logroñés	38	33	2	3	111	21	+90	101	Qualification to promotion playoffs
3	Náxara	38	27	6	5	111	40	+71	87 (Note: Náxara finished ahead of Haro on head-to-head points: Náxara–Haro 3–2, Haro–Náxara 2–2)	Qualification to promotion playoffs
4	Haro	38	27	6	5	91	31	+60	87	Qualification to promotion playoffs
5	Varea	38	24	6	8	84	42	+42	78	
6	Anguiano	38	23	6	9	102	59	+43	75	
7	Alfaro	38	22	3	13	84	43	+41	69	
8	UD Logroñés Promesas	38	20	5	13	79	48	+31	65	
9	Berceo	38	15	3	20	44	77	−33	48	
10	Pradejón	38	13	6	19	55	69	−14	45	
11	River Ebro	38	10	10	18	47	76	−29	40 (Note: River Ebro finished ahead of Yagüe on head-to-head points: River Ebro–Yagüe 4–1, Yagüe–River Ebro 3–5)	
12	Yagüe	38	12	4	22	57	112	−55	40	
13	Arnedo	38	12	2	24	55	92	−37	38	
14	Atlético Vianés	38	10	5	23	33	73	−40	35	
15	Agoncillo	38	9	6	23	46	80	−34	33	
16	Calasancio	38	9	5	24	32	70	−38	32	
17	Oyonesa	38	7	10	21	45	86	−41	31 (Note: Oyonesa finished ahead of Casalarreina on head-to-head points: Oyonesa–Casalarreina 0–0, Casalarreina–Oyonesa 1–2)	
18	Casalarreina (R)	38	9	4	25	37	86	−49	31	Relegation to Regional Preferente
19	Tedeón (R)	38	7	6	25	38	86	−48	27	Relegation to Regional Preferente
20	Villegas (R)	38	5	6	27	26	106	−80	21	Relegation to Regional Preferente

Updated to match(es) played on 13 May 2018. Source: Futbolme
Rules for classification: 1) points; 2) head-to-head points; 3) head-to-head goal difference; 4) goal difference; 5) number of goals scored; 6) fair-play points; 7) playoff match
(O) Play-off winners; (P) Promoted; (R) Relegated
Notes:

Top goalscorers

Goalscorers	Goals	Team
(Spain) Rodrigo Sanz	38	Calahorra
(Spain) Alejandro Conde	33	Haro
(Spain) Imanol Echeverría	30	SD Logroñés
(Spain) Rubén Pérez	29	Varea
(Spain) Javi Martínez	24	Náxara

Top goalkeeper

Goalkeeper	Goals	Matches	Average	Team
(Spain) Raúl Heras	32	30	1.07	Náxara

== Group 17 – Aragon ==
=== Teams ===
Location of teams of the 2017–18 Tercera División Group 17

Team	City	Home ground
Almudévar	Almudévar	La Corona
Atlético Monzón	Monzón	Isidro Calderón
Belchite 97	Belchite	Municipal
Binéfar	Binéfar	Los Olmos
Borja	Borja	Manuel Meler
Brea	Brea de Aragón	Piedrabuena
Cariñena	Cariñena	La Platera
Caspe	Caspe	Los Rosales
Ejea	Ejea de los Caballeros	Luchán
Fraga	Fraga	La Estacada
Illueca	Illueca	Papa Luna
La Almunia	La Almunia de Doña Godina	Tenerías
Robres	Robres	San Blas
Sabiñánigo	Sabiñánigo	Joaquín Ascaso
Sariñena	Sariñena	El Carmen
Tamarite	Tamarite de Litera	La Colomina
Tarazona	Tarazona	Municipal
Teruel	Teruel	Pinilla
Utebo	Utebo	Santa Ana
Valdefierro	Zaragoza	Valdefierro

=== League table ===
Pos	Team	Pld	W	D	L	GF	GA	GD	Pts	Qualification or relegation
1	Teruel (O, P)	38	25	7	6	81	30	+51	82	Qualification to group champions' playoffs
2	Borja	38	23	9	6	62	28	+34	78	Qualification to promotion playoffs
3	Ejea (O, P)	38	21	12	5	89	41	+48	75	Qualification to promotion playoffs
4	Tarazona	38	22	7	9	85	39	+46	73	Qualification to promotion playoffs
5	Robres	38	20	8	10	51	34	+17	68	
6	Tamarite	38	17	9	12	57	48	+9	60	
7	Illueca	38	16	11	11	53	44	+9	59	
8	Almudévar	38	14	12	12	62	59	+3	54	
9	Utebo	38	15	8	15	53	49	+4	53	
10	Brea	38	14	8	16	47	53	−6	50 (Note: Brea finished ahead of Sabiñánigo on head-to-head points: Sabiñánigo–Brea 0–0, Brea–Sabiñánigo 3–2)	
11	Sabiñánigo	38	12	14	12	43	48	−5	50	
12	Sariñena	38	11	13	14	49	49	0	46	
13	Atlético Monzón	38	12	7	19	43	58	−15	43 (Note: Atlético Monzón finished ahead of La Almunia on overall goal difference)	
14	La Almunia	38	12	7	19	50	73	−23	43	
15	Binéfar	38	11	8	19	40	62	−22	41 (Note: Binéfar finished ahead of Belchite 97 on head-to-head goal difference: Belchite 97–Binéfar 1–0, Binéfar–Belchite 97 3–1)	
16	Belchite 97	38	11	8	19	38	65	−27	41	
17	Fraga (R)	38	10	10	18	42	56	−14	40	Relegation to Regional Preferente
18	Valdefierro (R)	38	8	11	19	31	60	−29	35	Relegation to Regional Preferente
19	Cariñena (R)	38	5	14	19	36	77	−41	29	Relegation to Regional Preferente
20	Caspe (R)	38	4	11	23	25	63	−38	23	Relegation to Regional Preferente

Source: Futbolme
Rules for classification: 1) points; 2) head-to-head points; 3) head-to-head goal difference; 4) goal difference; 5) number of goals scored; 6) fair-play points; 7) playoff match
(O) Play-off winners; (P) Promoted; (R) Relegated
Notes:

Top goalscorers

Goalscorers	Goals	Team
(Spain) Adrià de Mesa	28	Ejea
(Spain) Cristian Dieste	24	Almudévar
(Spain) Alberto Morales	19	Illueca
(Spain) César Sanagustín	18	Fraga
(Spain) Ramón López	17	Ejea

Top goalkeeper

Goalkeeper	Goals	Matches	Average	Team
(Spain) Siro Arbe	29	38	0.76	Borja

== Group 18 – Castilla-La Mancha ==
=== Teams ===
Location of teams of the 2017–18 Tercera División Group 18

Team	City	Home ground
Albacete B	Albacete	Andrés Iniesta
Almagro	Almagro	Manuel Trujillo
Almansa	Almansa	Polideportivo Municipal
Atlético Ibañés	Casas-Ibáñez	Municipal
Atlético Tomelloso	Tomelloso	Paco Gálvez
Azuqueca	Azuqueca de Henares	San Miguel
Conquense	Cuenca	La Fuensanta
Guadalajara	Guadalajara	Pedro Escartín
La Roda	La Roda	Estadio Municipal
Madridejos	Madridejos	Nuevo Estadio
Manchego	Ciudad Real	Juan Carlos I
Marchamalo	Marchamalo	La Solana
Miguelturreño	Miguelturra	Municipal
Mora	Mora	Las Delicias
Pedroñeras	Las Pedroñeras	Municipal
Quintanar del Rey	Quintanar del Rey	San Marcos
Socuéllamos	Socuéllamos	Paquito Jiménez
Villacañas	Villacañas	Las Pirámides
Villarrobledo	Villarrobledo	Nuestra Señora de la Caridad
Villarrubia	Villarrubia de los Ojos	Nuevo Municipal

=== League table ===
Pos	Team	Pld	W	D	L	GF	GA	GD	Pts	Qualification or relegation
1	Conquense (O, P)	38	25	5	8	69	37	+32	80	Qualification to group champions' playoffs
2	Villarrobledo	38	23	10	5	81	33	+48	79	Qualification to promotion playoffs
3	Socuéllamos	38	19	14	5	80	34	+46	71	Qualification to promotion playoffs
4	Villarrubia	38	17	14	7	56	39	+17	65	Qualification to promotion playoffs
5	Albacete B	38	18	10	10	58	39	+19	64 (Note: Albacete B finished ahead of Guadalajara on head-to-head points: Albacete B–Guadalajara 2–0, Guadalajara–Albacete B 0–2)	
6	Guadalajara	38	19	7	12	59	40	+19	64	
7	Atlético Ibañés	38	17	9	12	52	43	+9	60	
8	Mora	38	18	5	15	53	45	+8	59	
9	Manchego	38	17	2	19	35	53	−18	53	
10	Azuqueca	38	13	12	13	52	44	+8	51	
11	La Roda	38	12	11	15	43	49	−6	47	
12	Marchamalo	38	11	11	16	49	55	−6	44 (Note: Marchamalo finished ahead of Madridejos on overall goal difference)	
13	Madridejos	38	12	8	18	34	62	−28	44	
14	Villacañas	38	11	10	17	44	53	−9	43 (Note: Villacañas finished ahead of Atlético Tomelloso on head-to-head points: Villacañas–Atlético Tomelloso 0–0, Atlético Tomelloso–Villacañas 1–2)	
15	Atlético Tomelloso	38	9	16	13	49	54	−5	43	
16	Quintanar del Rey	38	9	14	15	37	56	−19	41 (Note: Quintanar del Rey finished ahead of Almagro on head-to-head points: Almagro–Quintanar del Rey 1–2, Quintanar del Rey–Almagro 1–1)	
17	Almagro	38	10	11	17	33	48	−15	41	
18	Pedroñeras (R)	38	8	12	18	35	53	−18	36	Relegation to Primera Autonómica Preferente
19	Almansa (R)	38	6	16	16	41	59	−18	34	Relegation to Primera Autonómica Preferente
20	Miguelturreño (R)	38	3	9	26	24	89	−65	18	Relegation to Primera Autonómica Preferente

Source: Futbolme
Rules for classification: 1) points; 2) head-to-head points; 3) head-to-head goal difference; 4) goal difference; 5) number of goals scored; 6) fair-play points; 7) playoff match
(O) Play-off winners; (P) Promoted; (R) Relegated
Notes:

Top goalscorers

Goalscorers	Goals	Team
(Spain) Marcos Moreno	22	Atlético Ibañés
(Spain) Antonio Megías	21	Socuéllamos
(Spain) Rubén Moreno	21	Villarrubia
(Spain) Kike Espinosa	19	Pedroñeras
(Nigeria) Uzochukwu Ogumka	17	Conquense

Top goalkeeper

Goalkeeper	Goals	Matches	Average	Team
(Spain) David Sierra	26	30	0.87	Conquense
