= CD Burgalés =

Spanish football club

Burgalés
- Full name: Club Deportivo Burgalés
- Founded: 2006
- Dissolved: 2024
- Ground: San Amaro, Burgos, Castile and León, Spain
- Capacity: 500
- President: (Spain) Jairo De La Riva
- Head coach: (Spain) Moisés Ichaso
- 2023–24: Primera Provincial – Burgos, withdrew
- Website: http://cdbupolsa.es/
Home colours	Away colours

Club Deportivo Burgalés, was a Spanish football club from Burgos. Founded in 2006 as CD Estructuras Tino, the club was dissolved in 2024.

== History ==
Founded in 2006 as Club Deportivo Estructuras Tino, it started playing its games in Melgar de Fernamental. In 2010 the club was moved to Burgos for working as the farm club of Burgos CF and changed its name in 2011 to Club Deportivo Burgos.

In 2012 the collaboration with Burgos CF ended and CD Burgos continued playing as an independent club. In 2014 it changed officially its name to Club Deportivo Beroil Bupolsa, its two main sponsors. Two years later, as Beroil retires its sponsorship, the club changes again its name to Club Deportivo Bupolsa.

=== Club background ===
- Club Deportivo Estructuras Tino (2006–2010)
- Club Deportivo Burgos Club de Fútbol (2011–2014)
- Club Deportivo Beroil Bupolsa (2014–2016)
- Club Deportivo Bupolsa (2016–2022)
- Club Deportivo Burgalés (2022–2024)

== Season to season ==
Season	Tier	Division	Place	Copa del Rey
2006–07	7	2ª Prov.		
2007–08	7	2ª Prov.		
2008–09	6	1ª Prov.	2nd	
2009–10	6	1ª Prov.	1st	
2010–11	5	1ª Reg.	3rd	
2011–12	4	3ª	16th	
2012–13	5	1ª Reg.	3rd	
2013–14	4	3ª	8th	
2014–15	4	3ª	12th	

Season	Tier	Division	Place	Copa del Rey
2015–16	4	3ª	14th	
2016–17	4	3ª	11th	
2017–18	4	3ª	15th	
2018–19	4	3ª	16th	
2019–20	4	3ª	13th	
2020–21	4	3ª	19th	
2021–22	6	1ª Reg.	15th	
2022–23	7	1ª Prov.	3rd	
2023–24	7	1ª Prov.	14th	

- 8 seasons in Tercera División
