= Sergio Sánchez (footballer, born 1995) =

Spanish footballer

Personal information
- Full name: Sergio Sánchez Pérez
- Date of birth: 30 October 1995 (age 31)
- Place of birth: Ansó, Spain
- Height: 1.81 m (5 ft 11 in)
- Position: Forward

Team information
- Current team: Izarra
- Number: 15

Youth career
- 2011–2014: Huesca

Senior career*
Years	Team	Apps	(Gls)
2014	Huesca	3	(1)
2014–2015	Real Madrid C	27	(1)
2015	Osasuna B	15	(5)
2016–2017	Sabiñánigo	31	(13)
2017–2018	Almudévar	25	(9)
2017–2019	Huesca	0	(0)
2018	→ Teruel (loan)	5	(2)
2019	→ Tarazona (loan)	24	(6)
2019–2021	Tarazona	37	(16)
2021–	Izarra	9	(1)
- * Club domestic league appearances and goals as of 14 March 2021

Sergio Sánchez Pérez (born 30 October 1995) is a Spanish footballer who plays for CD Izarra as a forward.

== Club career ==
Born in Ansó, Huesca, Aragon, Sánchez was a SD Huesca youth graduate. On 20 April 2014, while still a junior, he made his first-team debut by coming on as a second-half substitute for Tariq Spezie and scoring his team's second in a 3–2 away win against Atlético Madrid B in the Segunda División B.

Sánchez moved to Real Madrid in July 2014, after having previously agreed a contract in April; he was assigned to the C-team in the Tercera División. On 5 July of the following year he joined another reserve team, CA Osasuna B still in the fourth tier.

On 16 December 2015, after discovering a heart problem, Sánchez announced his retirement from football at the age of 20. The following 18 October, he returned to action with AD Sabiñánigo.

Sánchez returned to Huesca in June 2017, being initially assigned to the farm team. He made his professional debut on 6 September, replacing Íñigo López in a 0–2 home loss against Real Valladolid in the season's Copa del Rey.

He joined SD Tarazona on 1 January 2019 on loan for the rest of the season. He joined the club on a permanent basis at the end of the loan spell.
