= Aceuchal =

- Municipality
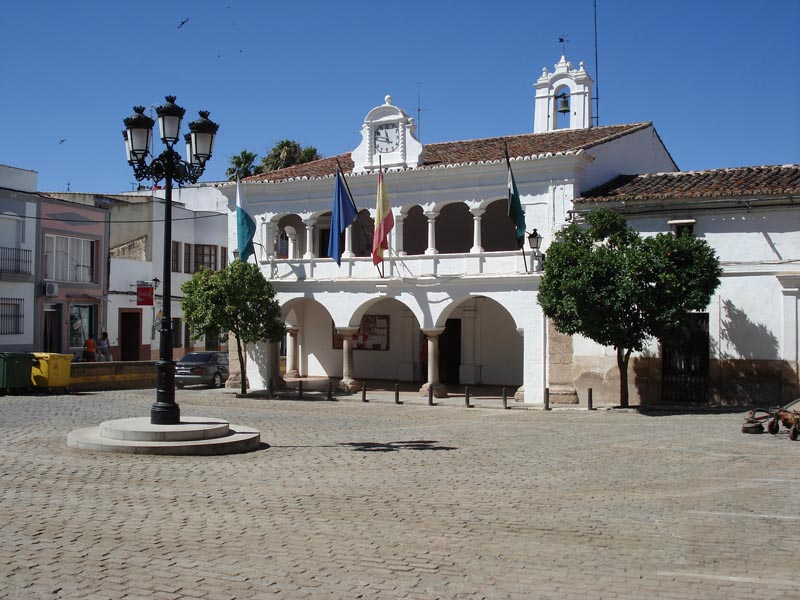
- Town Hall

- Flag Coat of arms

- Location of Aceuchal within Extremadura
- Coordinates: 38°39′00″N 6°28′59″W
- Country: Spain
- Autonomous community: Extremadura
- Province: Badajoz
- Comarca: Tierra de Barros

Area
  - Total: 63 km^{2} (24 sq mi)
- Elevation: 303 m (994 ft)

Population (2025-01-01)
  - Total: 5,307
  - Density: 84/km^{2} (220/sq mi)
- Time zone: UTC+1 (CET)
  - Summer (DST): UTC+2 (CEST)

Aceuchal (Spanish pronunciation: [aθewˈtʃal]) is a municipality located in the province of Badajoz, Extremadura, Spain. As of 2017 the municipality has a population of 5436 inhabitants.

== See also ==
- List of municipalities in Badajoz
