= SD Ejea =

Spanish association football club

Coordinates: 42.125978°N 1.123832°W

- Full name: Sociedad Deportiva Ejea
- Short name: EJE
- Founded: 1927; 99 years ago
- Stadium: Luchán
- Capacity: 2,249
- President: Salvador Mateo
- Head coach: Chechu Dorado
- League: Tercera Federación – Group 17
- 2025–26: Segunda Federación – Group 2, 15th of 18 (relegated)
- Website: www.sdejea.es
| Home colours | Away colours |

Sociedad Deportiva Ejea is a Spanish football team based in Ejea de los Caballeros, in the autonomous community of Aragon. Founded in 1927, it plays in Tercera Federación – Group 17, holding home games at Municipal de Luchán, with a 2,249-seat capacity.

== History ==
SD Ejea was founded on October 3, 1927 by the merging of Setia Foot-ball Club, Numancia Foot-ball Club and Sporting Foot-ball Club. Higinio Villacampa Murillo became its first president.

After competing in all categories of Aragonese regional football, Ejea was for the first time promoted to the Tercera División in 1956-57 season, also reaching the final of the Aragon Championship of Fans.

On 24 June 2018, Ejea promoted for the first time ever to Segunda División B after defeating three reserve teams in the promotion playoffs.

After a first season in the third division where the club avoided relegation, on 27 June 2019, Ejea agreed collaboration terms with SD Huesca to become their reserve team for the 2019–20 season. On 25 June 2019, Javi Suárez was appointed the new head coach. He replaced Guillermo Fernández Romo, who saved the club in Segunda División B in its debut season in the league.

=== Club background ===
- Club Deportivo Ejea (1941–1950; 1951–1973)
- Club Deportivo Ejeano (1950–1951)
- Sociedad Deportiva Ejea (1973–)

== Season to season ==
| Season | Tier | Division | Place | Copa del Rey |
|---|---|---|---|---|
| 1944–45 | 5 | 2ª Reg. | 7th | |
| 1945–46 | 4 | 1ª Reg. | 2nd | |
| 1946–47 | 4 | 1ª Reg. | 4th | |
| 1947–48 | 5 | 2ª Reg. | | |
| 1948–49 | 4 | 1ª Reg. | 5th | |
| 1949–50 | 4 | 1ª Reg. | (R) | |
| 1950–51 | 5 | 2ª Reg. | (R) | |
| 1951–52 | DNP | | | |
| 1952–53 | DNP | | | |
| 1953–54 | 5 | 2ª Reg. | 10th | |
| 1954–55 | 5 | 2ª Reg. | 7th | |
| 1955–56 | 4 | 1ª Reg. | 8th | |
| 1956–57 | 3 | 3ª | 12th | |
| 1957–58 | 3 | 3ª | 1st | |
| 1958–59 | 3 | 3ª | 5th | |
| 1959–60 | 3 | 3ª | 9th | |
| 1960–61 | 3 | 3ª | 10th | |
| 1961–62 | 3 | 3ª | 8th | |
| 1962–63 | 3 | 3ª | 3rd | |
| 1963–64 | 3 | 3ª | 6th | |

| Season | Tier | Division | Place | Copa del Rey |
|---|---|---|---|---|
| 1964–65 | 3 | 3ª | 12th | |
| 1965–66 | 3 | 3ª | 8th | |
| 1966–67 | 3 | 3ª | 4th | |
| 1967–68 | 3 | 3ª | 12th | |
| 1968–69 | 3 | 3ª | 19th | |
| 1969–70 | 4 | Reg. Pref. | 1st | |
| 1970–71 | 3 | 3ª | 20th | |
| 1971–72 | 4 | Reg. Pref. | 1st | |
| 1972–73 | 3 | 3ª | 20th | |
| 1973–74 | 4 | Reg. Pref. | 4th | |
| 1974–75 | 4 | Reg. Pref. | 6th | |
| 1975–76 | 4 | Reg. Pref. | 8th | |
| 1976–77 | 4 | Reg. Pref. | 18th | |
| 1977–78 | 5 | Reg. Pref. | 6th | |
| 1978–79 | 5 | Reg. Pref. | 2nd | |
| 1979–80 | 4 | 3ª | 19th | |
| 1980–81 | 4 | 3ª | 7th | |
| 1981–82 | 4 | 3ª | 19th | |
| 1982–83 | 5 | Reg. Pref. | 5th | |
| 1983–84 | 5 | Reg. Pref. | 1st | |

| Season | Tier | Division | Place | Copa del Rey |
|---|---|---|---|---|
| 1984–85 | 4 | 3ª | 6th | |
| 1985–86 | 4 | 3ª | 12th | |
| 1986–87 | 4 | 3ª | 12th | |
| 1987–88 | 4 | 3ª | 8th | |
| 1988–89 | 4 | 3ª | 5th | |
| 1989–90 | 4 | 3ª | 7th | |
| 1990–91 | 4 | 3ª | 6th | |
| 1991–92 | 4 | 3ª | 6th | |
| 1992–93 | 4 | 3ª | 19th | |
| 1993–94 | 5 | Reg. Pref. | 3rd | |
| 1994–95 | 5 | Reg. Pref. | 2nd | |
| 1995–96 | 4 | 3ª | 9th | |
| 1996–97 | 4 | 3ª | 9th | |
| 1997–98 | 4 | 3ª | 20th | |
| 1998–99 | 5 | Reg. Pref. | 7th | |
| 1999–2000 | 5 | Reg. Pref. | 2nd | |
| 2000–01 | 4 | 3ª | 18th | |
| 2001–02 | 5 | Reg. Pref. | 5th | |
| 2002–03 | 5 | Reg. Pref. | 5th | |
| 2003–04 | 5 | Reg. Pref. | 2nd | |

| Season | Tier | Division | Place | Copa del Rey |
|---|---|---|---|---|
| 2004–05 | 4 | 3ª | 19th | |
| 2005–06 | 5 | Reg. Pref. | 1st | |
| 2006–07 | 4 | 3ª | 5th | |
| 2007–08 | 4 | 3ª | 1st | |
| 2008–09 | 4 | 3ª | 5th | |
| 2009–10 | 4 | 3ª | 4th | |
| 2010–11 | 4 | 3ª | 5th | |
| 2011–12 | 4 | 3ª | 1st | |
| 2012–13 | 4 | 3ª | 6th | Second round |
| 2013–14 | 4 | 3ª | 3rd | |
| 2014–15 | 4 | 3ª | 10th | |
| 2015–16 | 4 | 3ª | 6th | |
| 2016–17 | 4 | 3ª | 4th | |
| 2017–18 | 4 | 3ª | 3rd | |
| 2018–19 | 3 | 2ª B | 14th | |
| 2019–20 | 3 | 2ª B | 15th | N/A (Note: Reserve team of Huesca.) |
| 2020–21 | 3 | 2ª B | 8th / 2nd | |
| 2021–22 | 4 | 2ª RFEF | 18th | |
| 2022–23 | 5 | 3ª Fed. | 4th | |
| 2023–24 | 5 | 3ª Fed. | 1st | |

| Season | Tier | Division | Place | Copa del Rey |
|---|---|---|---|---|
| 2024–25 | 4 | 2ª Fed. | 7th | Second round |
| 2025–26 | 4 | 2ª Fed. | 15th | |
| 2026–27 | 5 | 3ª Fed. | | |

- 3 seasons in Segunda División B
- 3 seasons in Segunda Federación/Segunda División RFEF
- 44 seasons in Tercera División
- 3 seasons in Tercera Federación

== Honours ==
- Tercera División
  - Winners (3): 1957–58, 2007–08, 2011–12

== Current squad ==
As of 18 July 2026

Note: Flags indicate national team as defined under FIFA eligibility rules; some limited exceptions apply. Players may hold more than one non-FIFA nationality.

| No. | Pos. | Nation | Player |
|---|---|---|---|
| 1 | GK | ESP | Yzan Acin |
| 2 | DF | ESP | Mario Sánchez |
| 3 | DF | ESP | Diego Royo |
| 4 | MF | ESP | Dani Ciriano |
| 5 | MF | MLI | Zakarya Maiga (on loan from Girona B) |
| 6 | MF | ESP | Javi Díez |
| 7 | MF | ESP | Edu García |
| 8 | MF | ESP | Martín Lapeña |
| 9 | FW | ESP | Erik Vázquez (on loan from Tudelano) |
| 10 | MF | ESP | David Iglesias |
| 11 | FW | ESP | David Álvarez |

| No. | Pos. | Nation | Player |
|---|---|---|---|
| 12 | FW | ESP | Giovanni Navarro |
| 13 | GK | ESP | Francisco Dorronsoro |
| 14 | MF | ESP | Fabio Conte |
| 15 | DF | ESP | Aimar Collante |
| 18 | DF | ESP | Lalo Arantegui |
| 19 | MF | ESP | Pablo Agustin |
| 20 | DF | GHA | Prince Amponsah |
| 22 | DF | ESP | David Chica |
| 23 | FW | ESP | Adrián Turmo |
| 25 | GK | ESP | Germán Fernández |
