= UD Los Garres =

Association football club in Spain

Los Garres
- Full name: Unión Deportiva Los Garres
- Founded: 2007
- Ground: Las Tejeras, Murcia, Spain
- Capacity: 1,000
- Chairman: Juan Cristóbal Meseguer
- Manager: Gabi Correa
- League: Tercera Federación – Group 13
- 2025–26: Preferente Autonómica, 4th of 18 (promoted)
Home colours	Away colours

Unión Deportiva Los Garres is a Spanish football club based in Los Garres, Murcia. Founded in 2007, it currently plays in Tercera Federación – Group 13, holding home matches at the Campo Municipal Las Tejeras, with a capacity of 1,000 people.

== Season to season ==
Season	Tier	Division	Place	Copa del Rey
2007–08	6	1ª Reg.	8th	
2008–09	6	Liga Aut.	10th	
2009–10	6	Liga Aut.	2nd	
2010–11	5	Pref. Aut.	9th	
2011–12	5	Pref. Aut.	12th	
2012–13	5	Pref. Aut.	14th	
2013–14	5	Pref. Aut.	12th	
2014–15	5	Pref. Aut.	10th	
2015–16	5	Pref. Aut.	8th	
2016–17	5	Pref. Aut.	5th	
2017–18	4	3ª	17th	
2018–19	4	3ª	12th	
2019–20	4	3ª	10th	
2020–21	4	3ª	4th / 3rd	
2021–22	5	3ª RFEF	18th	
2022–23	6	Pref. Aut.	9th	
2023–24	6	Pref. Aut.	4th	
2024–25	6	Pref. Aut.	5th	
2025–26	6	Pref. Aut.	4th	First round
2026–27	5	3ª Fed.		

- 4 seasons in Tercera División
- 2 seasons in Tercera Federación/Tercera División RFEF
