= Internacional de Madrid =

Association football club in Spain

Coordinates: 40.4162°N 3.8601°W

- Full name: Internacional de Madrid
- Founded: 2002; 24 years ago
- Dissolved: 2022
- Ground: Campo Municipal; Villaviciosa de Odón, Community of Madrid, Spain
- Capacity: 2,000
- President: Stephen Newman
- Head coach: Alfredo Santaelena
- 2022–23: Primera División RFEF – Group 1 (resigned)
- Website: interdemadrid.com
Home colours	Away colours	Third colours

Internacional de Madrid, simply known as Inter de Madrid, was a Spanish football team based in Villaviciosa de Odón, in the Community of Madrid. Founded in 2002, it last played in Primera Federación - Group 1, holding home games at the Campos Municipales de Villaviciosa de Odón.

== History ==
Logo used between 2020 and 2022, when the club was owned by Dux Gaming

International de Madrid was founded in 2002 by a group of businesspersons. The idea of creating the club came to Stephen Kenneth Newman, co-owner of the real estate services consulting company. In its first season, the club joined the Tercera Regional (eighth tier), and played its home games at Orcasitas, Madrid. Internacional finished its first season being promoted after winning all the games played, scoring 187 goals and conceding only 25.

In 2003, the club took the place of Sporting Getafe CF, relegated from the fifth tier, and played in Primera Regional (sixth division). It achieved a second consecutive promotion in its second season, again leading its group, with 128 goals for and only 17 against.

Internacional de Madrid continued the following seasons playing in Regional Preferente, 5th tier. In 2010 they achieved for the first time the promotion to Tercera División by finishing as runners-up of their group.

In 2016, Internacional moved from Moraleja de Enmedio to Boadilla del Monte.

Internacional won the Madrid group in the 2017–18 Tercera División and gained promotion to Segunda División B for the first time with a 1–1 aggregate away goals victory over CD Tenerife B in the playoffs. Before the start of the 2018–19 season Marcos Jiménez became the club's head coach. In its first season in the Segunda División B the club finished 14th and remained its place in this category.

On 30 June 2020, DUX Gaming, a Spanish eSports club, announced the co-ownership of the club. The club also announced the renaming of the team to DUX Internacional de Madrid. At the same time, the club moved their headquarters to Villaviciosa de Odón.

On 1 September 2022, the club resigned from 2022–23 season due to economic problems. Five days later, Dux ended their partnership with the club.

== Season to season ==
Season	Tier	Division	Place	Copa del Rey
2002–03	8	3ª Reg.	1st	
2003–04	6	1ª Reg.	1st	
2004–05	5	Reg. Pref.	13th	
2005–06	5	Reg. Pref.	4th	
2006–07	5	Reg. Pref.	8th	
2007–08	5	Reg. Pref.	8th	
2008–09	5	Reg. Pref.	3rd	
2009–10	5	Pref.	2nd	
2010–11	4	3ª	6th	
2011–12	4	3ª	6th	
2012–13	4	3ª	11th	

Season	Tier	Division	Place	Copa del Rey
2013–14	4	3ª	5th	
2014–15	4	3ª	7th	
2015–16	4	3ª	16th	
2016–17	4	3ª	9th	
2017–18	4	3ª	1st	
2018–19	3	2ª B	14th	First round
2019–20	3	2ª B	8th	
2020–21	3	2ª B	3rd / 5th	First round
2021–22	3	1ª RFEF	14th	First round
2022–23	3	1ª Fed.	Ret.	

- 2 seasons in Primera División RFEF
- 3 seasons in Segunda División B
- 8 seasons in Tercera División

== Honours ==
- Tercera División: 2017–18

== Stadiums ==
- Municipal de Orcasitas (2002–2004)
- Municipal Dehesa de la Villa (2004–2006)
- Municipal de Moraleja de Enmedio (2006–2016)
- Municipal de Boadilla del Monte (2016–20)
- Municipal de Villaviciosa de Odón (2020-)

== See also ==
- DUX Logroño
