= UM Escobedo =

Association football club in Spain

Coordinates: 43.402933°N 3.905500°W

Escobedo
- Full name: Unión Montañesa Escobedo
- Founded: 1917
- Ground: Eusebio Arce, Escobedo, Cantabria, Spain
- Capacity: 2,000
- Chairman: José Luis Merino
- Manager: Samuel San José
- League: Tercera Federación – Group 3
- 2025–26: Tercera Federación – Group 3, 5th of 18
- Website: www.umescobedo.com
Home colours	Away colours

Unión Montañesa Escobedo is a Spanish football team based in Escobedo, Camargo, in the autonomous community of Cantabria. Founded in 1917 it plays in Tercera Federación – Group 3, holding home matches at Estadio Eusebio Arce.

== History ==
Escobedo was founded in 1917, but started playing in 1964. The team played in the regional leagues for the vast majority of its first 26 years, with the one exception being a season-long stay in Tercera División in 1967–68.

The team returned to the category, now the national fourth division, twenty-one years later, remaining there for the subsequent decades. In 1991–92 and the following campaigns it was crowned division champions, adding four runner-up places; however, none of the ten promotion playoff visits to Segunda División B was successful.

Escobedo reached the third round of the Copa del Rey in 1991–92, falling to CD Málaga 0–3 on aggregate. Two years later the club qualified to the same stage, losing over two legs to UE Lleida.

On 28 September 2017, Escobedo achieved its first regional tournament by winning the Cantabrian stage of the Copa Federación after beating Cayón by a huge 3–0 in the final. In the 2018-19 season the club won Group 3 of the Tercera División.

== Season to season ==
Season	Tier	Division	Place	Copa del Rey
1964–65	4	1ª Reg.	17th	
1965–66	4	1ª Reg.	15th	
1966–67	4	1ª Reg.	1st	
1967–68	3	3ª	15th	
1968–69	4	1ª Reg.	7th	
1969–70	4	1ª Reg.	11th	
1970–71	4	1ª Reg.	16th	
1971–72	5	2ª Reg.	14th	
1972–73	6	3ª Reg.	2nd	
1973–74	5	2ª Reg.	11th	
1974–75	5	1ª Reg.	7th	
1975–76	4	Reg. Pref.	15th	
1976–77	5	1ª Reg.	11th	
1977–78	6	1ª Reg.	2nd	
1978–79	5	Reg. Pref.	16th	
1979–80	5	Reg. Pref.	19th	
1980–81	6	1ª Reg.	9th	
1981–82	6	1ª Reg.	5th	
1982–83	6	1ª Reg.	5th	
1983–84	5	Reg. Pref.	13th	

Season	Tier	Division	Place	Copa del Rey
1984–85	5	Reg. Pref.	5th	
1985–86	5	Reg. Pref.	14th	
1986–87	5	Reg. Pref.	7th	
1987–88	5	Reg. Pref.	11th	
1988–89	5	Reg. Pref.	3rd	
1989–90	4	3ª	3rd	
1990–91	4	3ª	4th	Second round
1991–92	4	3ª	1st	Third round
1992–93	4	3ª	1st	First round
1993–94	4	3ª	5th	Second round
1994–95	4	3ª	3rd	
1995–96	4	3ª	14th	
1996–97	4	3ª	15th	
1997–98	4	3ª	3rd	
1998–99	4	3ª	2nd	
1999–2000	4	3ª	8th	
2000–01	4	3ª	10th	
2001–02	4	3ª	15th	
2002–03	4	3ª	10th	
2003–04	4	3ª	9th	

Season	Tier	Division	Place	Copa del Rey
2004–05	4	3ª	2nd	
2005–06	4	3ª	2nd	Preliminary
2006–07	4	3ª	2nd	
2007–08	4	3ª	4th	
2008–09	4	3ª	4th	
2009–10	4	3ª	2nd	
2010–11	4	3ª	6th	
2011–12	4	3ª	6th	
2012–13	4	3ª	11th	
2013–14	4	3ª	4th	
2014–15	4	3ª	12th	
2015–16	4	3ª	8th	
2016–17	4	3ª	9th	
2017–18	4	3ª	2nd	
2018–19	4	3ª	1st	
2019–20	4	3ª	6th	Second round
2020–21	4	3ª	3rd / 6th	
2021–22	5	3ª RFEF	3rd	
2022–23	5	3ª Fed.	4th	
2023–24	5	3ª Fed.	1st	

Season	Tier	Division	Place	Copa del Rey
2024–25	4	2ª Fed.	13th	First round
2025–26	5	3ª Fed.	5th	
2026–27	5	3ª Fed.		

- 1 season in Segunda Federación
- 33 seasons in Tercera División
- 5 seasons in Tercera Federación/Tercera División RFEF

== Stadium ==
Escobedo's home ground is the Estadio Eusebio Arce, around a mile west of Muriedas, the capital of Camargo. It has a capacity of 2,000 seats with a low, cantilevered stand that runs the length of the pitch on the north side of the enclosure. The stand also houses the players changing facilities, club offices and a social club.
