= David Amigo =

Spanish footballer

Personal information
- Full name: David Amigo Calamardo
- Date of birth: 22 October 2002 (age 24)
- Place of birth: Parla, Spain
- Height: 1.80 m (5 ft 11 in)
- Position: Winger

Team information
- Current team: Guadalajara
- Number: 10

Youth career
- Parla Escuela
- 2016–2021: Fuenlabrada

Senior career*
Years	Team	Apps	(Gls)
2021	Fuenlabrada B	3	(1)
2021–2023	Fuenlabrada	43	(0)
2021–2022	Fuenlabrada Promesas	33	(9)
2023–2024	Cádiz B	20	(2)
2024–	Guadalajara	54	(15)
- * Club domestic league appearances and goals as of 10 June 2026

David Amigo Calamardo (born 22 October 2002) is a Spanish footballer who plays as a winger for CD Guadalajara.

== Club career ==
After representing CP Parla Escuela, Amigo moved to CF Fuenlabrada's youth setup in 2016. He made his senior debut with the latter's reserves on 2 May 2021, coming on as a half-time substitute in a 3–1 Preferente de Madrid away win against CD Fortuna.

Amigo made his first team debut on 19 May 2021, as he replaced Jano in a 0–1 away loss against UD Logroñés in the Segunda División championship. Four days later he scored his first senior goal, netting the B's opener in a 3–1 home win against CD Humanes.

On 24 November 2022, Amigo renewed with Fuenla until 2025. On 1 August of the following year, he signed a two-year contract with Cádiz CF, being initially assigned to the reserves in Segunda Federación.
