= Jorge Moreno (footballer) =

Spanish footballer

Personal information
- Full name: Jorge Moreno San Vidal
- Date of birth: 25 July 2001 (age 25)
- Place of birth: Tres Cantos, Spain
- Height: 1.84 m (6 ft 0 in)
- Position: Centre-back

Team information
- Current team: Tenerife

Youth career
- 2013–2017: Tres Cantos
- 2017–2018: Aravaca
- 2018–2019: Rayo Vallecano

Senior career*
| Years | Team | Apps | (Gls) |
| 2019–2023 | Rayo Vallecano B | 41 | (7) |
| 2021–2022 | → Cultural Leonesa (loan) | 30 | (3) |
| 2022–2023 | → Córdoba (loan) | 29 | (0) |
| 2023–2024 | Osasuna B | 34 | (1) |
| 2024–2025 | Osasuna | 1 | (0) |
| 2024–2025 | → Cartagena (loan) | 23 | (0) |
| 2025–2026 | Cádiz | 19 | (1) |
| 2026– | Tenerife | 0 | (0) |
- * Club domestic league appearances and goals as of 9 June 2026

Jorge Moreno San Vidal (born 25 July 2001) is a Spanish professional footballer who plays as a centre-back for CD Tenerife.

== Career ==
Moreno was born in Tres Cantos, Community of Madrid, and joined Rayo Vallecano's youth setup in 2018, from Aravaca CF. He was promoted to the reserves in July 2019, and made his senior debut on 1 September, starting in a 4–1 Tercera División away routing of CD San Fernando de Henares.

Moreno scored his first senior goal on 10 November 2019, netting the B's fourth in a 4–3 home win over CD Leganés B. On 12 August 2021, already established as a regular starter for the B-side, he renewed his contract until 2023, and was loaned to Primera División RFEF side Cultural y Deportiva Leonesa late in the month.

In July 2022, after being a first-choice at Cultu, Moreno further extended his link with Rayo until 2024, and moved to fellow third division side Córdoba CF in a season-long loan deal.

On 1 September 2023, Moreno terminated his link with Rayo and subsequently moved to CA Osasuna, being initially assigned to the reserves also in the third division. He made his first team – and La Liga – debut on 11 May of the following year, coming on as a second-half substitute for Jesús Areso in a 2–2 away draw against Athletic Bilbao.

On 24 July 2024, Moreno was loaned to Segunda División side FC Cartagena for the 2024–25 campaign. On 7 August of the following year, he signed a three-year contract with Cádiz CF also in the second division.

On 1 July 2026, Moreno terminated his link with the Yellow Submarine, and agreed to a two-year deal with fellow second division side CD Tenerife five days later.
