= Alejandro Claverías =

Spanish footballer

Personal information
- Full name: Alejandro Claverías Gutiérrez
- Date of birth: 1 July 2000 (age 26)
- Place of birth: Madrid, Spain
- Height: 1.63 m (5 ft 4 in)
- Position: Midfielder

Team information
- Current team: Melilla
- Number: 14

Youth career
- 2006–2007: Moratalaz
- 2007–2018: Real Madrid
- 2018–2019: Leganés

Senior career*
| Years | Team | Apps | (Gls) |
| 2019–2020 | Móstoles B | 22 | (1) |
| 2020–2021 | Móstoles | 22 | (1) |
| 2021–2022 | Sant Rafel | 35 | (7) |
| 2022 | Ibiza | 1 | (1) |
| 2022–2023 | Paracuellos Antamira | 24 | (5) |
| 2023–2024 | Rayo Majadahonda | 17 | (0) |
| 2024 | Getafe B | 12 | (2) |
| 2024–2025 | Navalcarnero | 30 | (4) |
| 2025– | Melilla | 3 | (0) |
- * Club domestic league appearances and goals as of 28 September 2025

Alejandro Claverías Gutiérrez (born 1 July 2000), also known as Clave, is a Spanish professional footballer who plays as a midfielder for Segunda Federación club Melilla.

== Club career ==
Born in Madrid, Claverías joined Real Madrid's La Fábrica in 2007, aged seven, from ED Moratalaz. He left their side in 2018, and spent a short period on trial at FC Barcelona before joining CD Leganés.

In 2019, after finishing his formation, Claverías moved to CD Móstoles URJC and was initially assigned to the reserves in the Preferente de Madrid. On 1 July 2020, he was promoted to the main squad in Tercera División.

On 15 July 2021, Claverías signed for UD Ibiza, being assigned to the farm team in Tercera División RFEF. He made his first team debut the following 29 May, starting and scoring his side's first in a 2–3 Segunda División away loss against Real Oviedo.
