= Lolo Escobar =

Spanish football manager

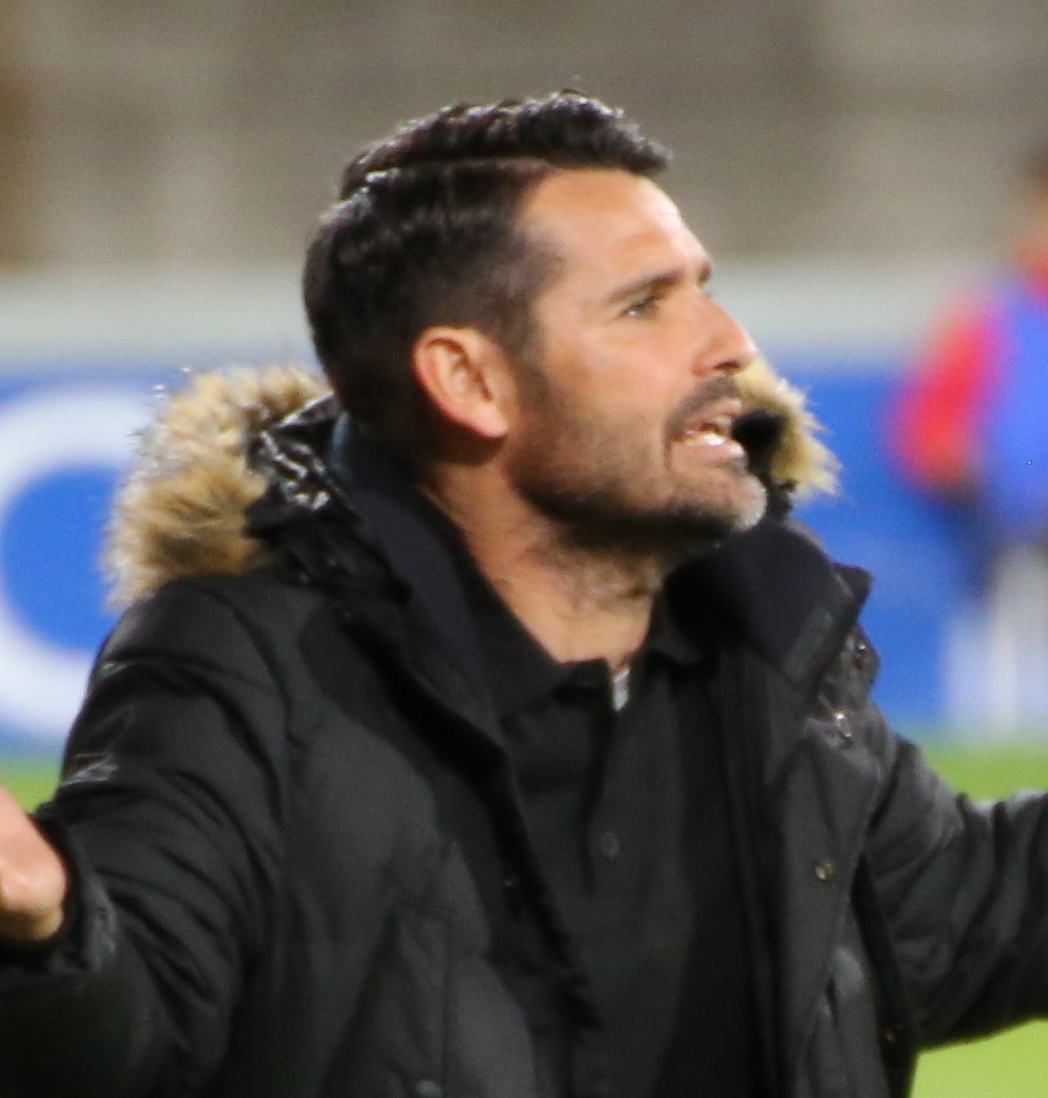
- Escobar in 2024

Personal information
- Full name: Manuel María Escobar Rodríguez
- Date of birth: 13 May 1976 (age 50)
- Place of birth: Don Benito, Spain

Team information
- Current team: Numancia (manager)

Youth career
- 1990–1994: Las Rozas

Senior career*
Years	Team	Apps	(Gls)
1994–1997	Las Rozas		

Managerial career
- 1994–1997: Las Rozas (youth)
- 1997–1999: Alcobendas (youth)
- 1999–2001: Rayo Majadahonda (youth)
- 2001–2003: EFMO Boadilla (youth)
- 2003–2005: Villanueva Pardillo (youth)
- 2005–2010: Villanueva Pardillo
- 2010–2014: Unión Adarve
- 2014–2015: Puerta Bonita
- 2015–2016: Trival Valderas
- 2016–2017: Alcobendas
- 2017–2020: Las Rozas
- 2021: Salamanca
- 2021–2022: Mirandés
- 2022–2023: Hércules
- 2023–2024: Algeciras
- 2024–2025: Lugo
- 2026: Avilés Industrial
- 2026–: Numancia
- * Club domestic league appearances and goals

Manuel María "Lolo" Escobar Rodríguez (born 13 May 1976) is a Spanish football manager and former player. He is the current manager of CD Numancia.

== Career ==
Born in Don Benito, Badajoz, Extremadura, Escobar moved to Madrid with his parents and joined CD Las Rozas' youth setup at the age of 14. He then went on to feature for the first team before leaving the club at the age of 21.

Escobar began coaching at the age of just 18, being in charge of Las Rozas' Infantil B squad. He subsequently worked in the youth categories of CF Rayo Majadahonda, EF Madrid Oeste Boadilla and FC Villanueva del Pardillo before being named manager of the latter side's first team. He promoted the club from the Segunda de Aficionados (seventh division) to the Preferente (fifth tier) before being sacked in March 2010.

In August 2010, Escobar was named manager of AD Unión Adarve in the fifth division. He helped the club in their promotion to Tercera División in his first season, and reached the play-offs twice in 2013 and 2014, missing out promotion in both.

On 26 June 2014, Escobar took over fellow fourth division side CD Puerta Bonita. He resigned the following January alleging "personal reasons", and was presented as manager of CF Trival Valderas on 29 June 2015.

On 30 June 2016, Escobar was named at the helm of Alcobendas CF, still in division four. He returned to Las Rozas on 8 June of the following year, taking over the main squad in the fifth division and achieving two consecutive promotions.

On 13 May 2020, Escobar announced his departure from Las Rozas after the club kept their Segunda División B status. The following 3 January, after six months without a club, he took over fellow third division side Salamanca CF UDS, severely threatened with relegation.

Escobar managed to avoid relegation with the club, but left on 27 May 2021. On 4 June, he replaced José Alberto at the helm of Segunda División side CD Mirandés.

Escobar's first professional match occurred on 16 August 2021, a 0–0 away draw against Málaga CF. On 13 February of the following year, after a 0–3 home loss against Sporting de Gijón, he was sacked.

On 5 December 2022, Escobar was appointed manager of Segunda Federación side Hércules CF, replacing sacked Ángel Rodríguez. He left the club the following 8 July, and took over Algeciras CF in Primera Federación just hours later.

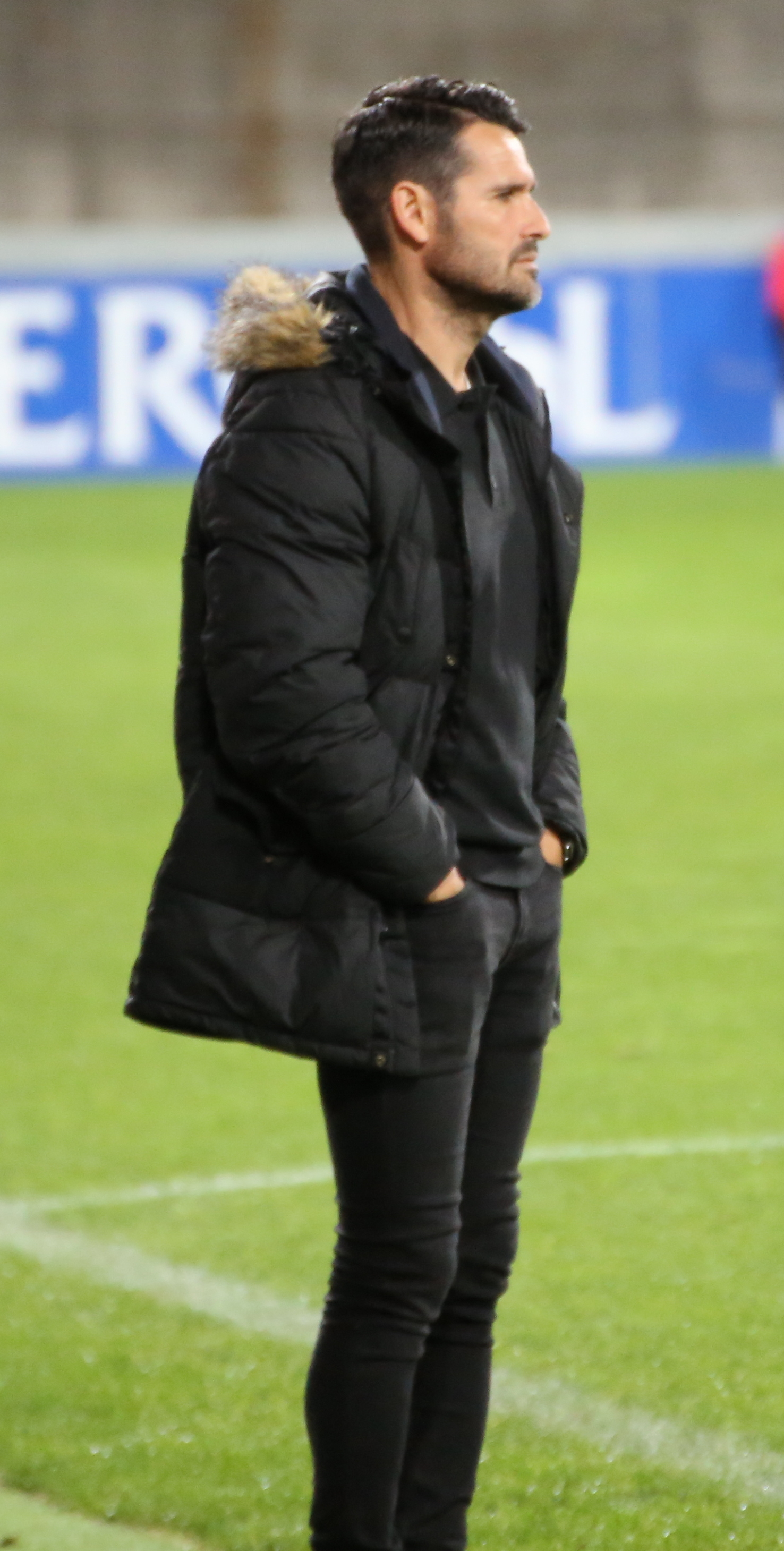
Escobar managing Lugo in 2024

On 27 May 2024, after avoiding relegation with Algeciras, Escobar departed the club and was named at the helm of fellow third division side CD Lugo on 11 June. On 20 January 2025, however, he was dismissed from the latter.

On 23 March 2026, after more than a year without a club, Escobar returned to the third division as he was named manager of Real Avilés Industrial CF on a deal until the end of the season. On 30 May, after narrowly avoiding relegation, he left, and took over CD Numancia in the fourth division on 15 June.

== Managerial statistics ==
As of 8 November 2026

Managerial record by team and tenure
Team	Nat	From	To	Record								Ref
Team	Nat	From	To	G	W	D	L	GF	GA	GD	Win %	Ref
Villanueva del Pardillo	(Spain)	1 July 2005	29 March 2010	162	82	38	42	282	182	+100	50.62	
Unión Adarve	(Spain)	9 August 2010	27 May 2014	158	74	49	35	205	133	+72	46.84	
Puerta Bonita	(Spain)	26 June 2014	26 January 2015	21	8	8	5	25	18	+7	38.10	
Trival Valderas	(Spain)	29 June 2015	22 May 2016	38	15	12	11	44	35	+9	39.47	
Alcobendas	(Spain)	30 June 2016	15 May 2017	38	10	14	14	29	37	−8	26.32	
Las Rozas	(Spain)	8 June 2017	13 May 2020	107	57	29	21	179	99	+80	53.27	
Salamanca	(Spain)	3 January 2021	27 May 2021	18	8	8	2	25	12	+13	44.44	
Mirandés	(Spain)	4 June 2021	13 February 2022	30	10	6	14	39	45	−6	33.33	
Hércules	(Spain)	5 December 2022	7 July 2023	21	10	5	6	21	19	+2	47.62	
Algeciras	(Spain)	8 July 2023	27 May 2024	38	11	13	14	39	43	−4	28.95	
Lugo	(Spain)	11 June 2024	20 January 2025	25	9	8	8	25	21	+4	36.00	
Avilés Industrial	(Spain)	23 March 2026	30 May 2026	9	2	4	3	14	18	−4	22.22	
Numancia	(Spain)	15 June 2026	Present	11	5	5	1	19	8	+11	45.45	
Total				676	301	199	176	946	670	+276	44.53	—
