= Ángel López (football manager) =

Spanish football coach (born 1983)

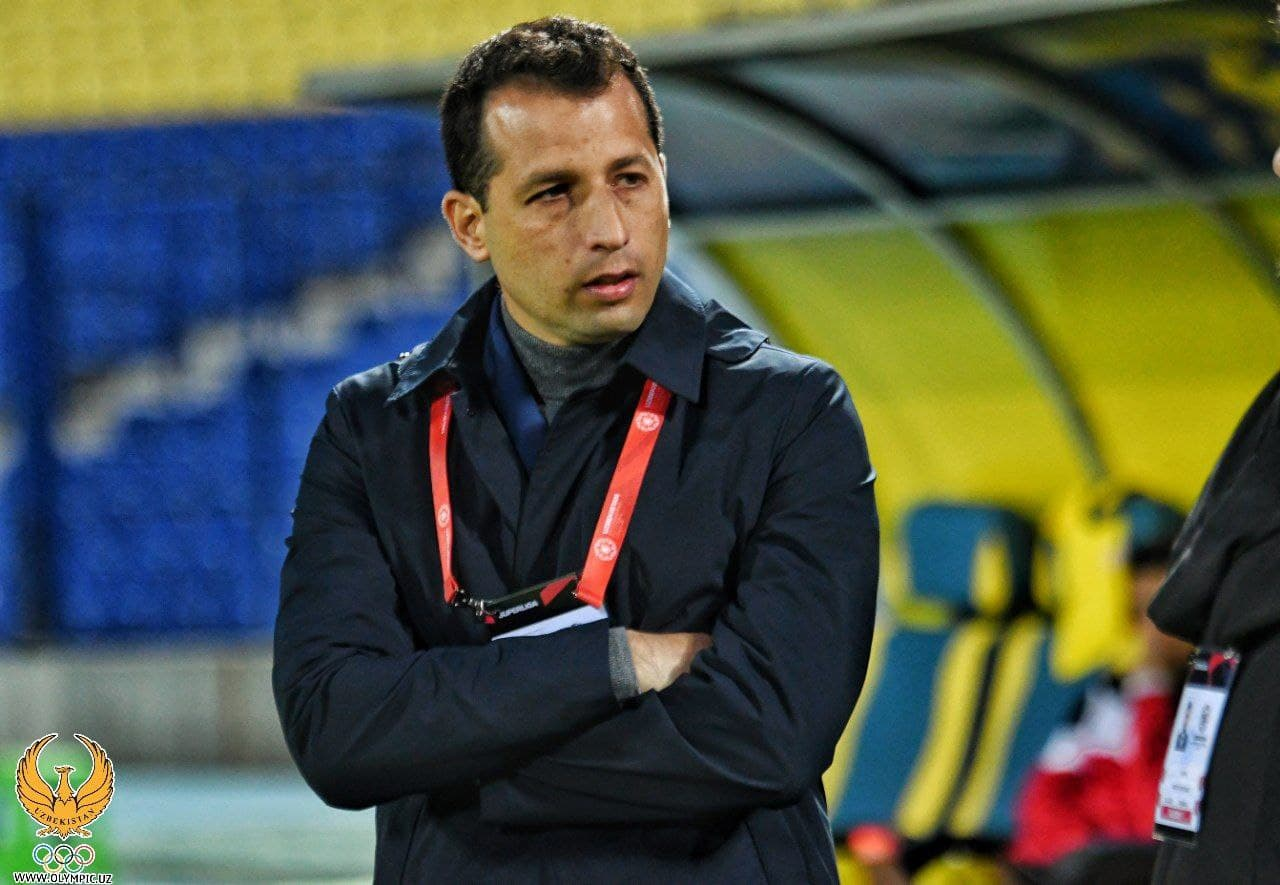

Personal information
- Full name: Ángel López Pérez
- Date of birth: 5 April 1983 (age 43)
- Place of birth: Madrid, Spain

Youth career
- Years: Team
- Vicálvaro
- Roma
- San Fernando Henares

Managerial career
- 2017–2018: Recreativo
- 2018–2019: Equatorial Guinea
- 2020: Delfín
- 2020–2021: Volos
- 2021: Atromitos
- 2022: Surkhon Termez
- 2023: Ethnikos Achna
- 2023–2024: Volos
- 2024: Al Ahli Club (Manama)
- 2025–2026: Nea Salamis

Ángel López Pérez (born 5 April 1983) is a Spanish professional football coach and former player.

== Playing career ==
Born in Madrid, López represented Vicálvaro, Roma and San Fernando Henares as a youth before retiring at the age of 18 to start his studies.

== Managerial career ==
After retiring, he started working as a fitness coach at Coslada, subsequently having the same role at Internacional de Madrid, San Fernando and Getafe B.

In 2007, López was included in Michael Laudrup's squad in Getafe's first team, again as a fitness coach.

López followed Cosmin Contra to Getafe, Guangzhou R&F and Al Shabab Al Arabi Club Dubai, always as his assistant. In July 2017, he returned to Spain to work as Javier Casquero's assistant at Recreativo, but was appointed manager in November after Casquero's dismissal.

López was sacked by Recre on 11 February 2018, and on 10 October, he took over the Equatorial Guinea national team manager role. On 28 September 2019, he resigned from the Nzalang.

On 27 December 2019, López was named at the helm of Ecuadorian club Delfín for the ensuing campaign. He was dismissed after three league matches.

In September 2020, he became manager of Greek club Volos. On 20 April 2021, he was released with a mutual agreement from Volos.

In May 2021, he moved to Atromitos. He later managed Uzbekistan Super League club Surkhon Termez and Cypriot club Ethnikos Achna.

In November 2023, he returned to Volos. He was sacked on 21 February 2024 and signed for Al Ahli Club (Manama) in the Bahraini Premier League in July 2024.

In June 2025, he was offered the job at Nea Salamis in the Cypriot Second Division. In February 2026, after only 21 rounds (19 wins and 2 draws), Nea Salamis were promoted to Cypriot First Division. He was sacked on 10 November 2026.
