= Pablo Muñoz (footballer) =

Spanish footballer

Personal information
- Full name: Pablo Muñoz Crespo
- Date of birth: 4 September 2003 (age 23)
- Place of birth: San Sebastián de los Reyes, Spain
- Height: 1.70 m (5 ft 7 in)
- Position: Midfielder

Team information
- Current team: Guadalajara
- Number: 19

Youth career
- 2016–2017: Alcobendas
- 2017–2018: Chamartín Vergara
- 2018–2022: Rayo Vallecano

Senior career*
| Years | Team | Apps | (Gls) |
| 2022–2023 | Rayo Vallecano B | 26 | (5) |
| 2022–2023 | Rayo Vallecano | 2 | (0) |
| 2023–2025 | Deportivo La Coruña | 2 | (0) |
| 2024 | → Atlético Baleares (loan) | 4 | (0) |
| 2024–2025 | → Marbella (loan) | 24 | (2) |
| 2025– | Guadalajara | 38 | (6) |
- * Club domestic league appearances and goals as of 10 June 2026

Pablo Muñoz Crespo (born 4 September 2003) is a Spanish professional footballer who plays as a midfielder for CD Guadalajara.

== Career ==
Muñoz was born in San Sebastián de los Reyes, Community of Madrid, and is a youth product of Alcobendas CF, CD Chamartín Vergara and Rayo Vallecano. He gained national attention after scoring 19 goals with the latter's under-19 team as a midfielder in the 2021–22 season.

Muñoz was promoted to Rayo's reserves in Tercera Federación for the 2022–23 season, and signed his first professional contract with the club on 20 May 2022. He made his first team – and professional – debut with Rayo as a late substitute in a 1–1 La Liga tie with Atlético Madrid on 18 October 2022.

On 1 September 2023, Muñoz signed a two-year contract with Primera Federación side Deportivo de La Coruña. The following 25 January, after featuring rarely, he was loaned to fellow league team CD Atlético Baleares until June.

On 29 June 2024, Muñoz renewed his link with Dépor until 2026, being assigned to the reserves in Segunda Federación. On 1 August, however, he moved to Marbella FC in the third division on loan for the season.

On 4 July 2025, Muñoz moved to third division newcomers CD Guadalajara on a one-year deal.
