= José Ramón Sandoval =

Spanish football manager (born 1968)

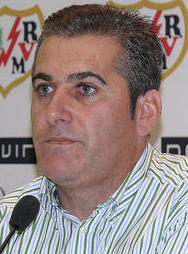
- Sandoval with Rayo Vallecano in 2011

Personal information
- Full name: José Ramón Sandoval Huertas
- Date of birth: 2 May 1968 (age 58)
- Place of birth: Madrid, Spain
- Position: Forward

Youth career
- Years: Team
- Real Madrid
- Humanes
- Ciempozuelos

Managerial career
- 1996–1999: Humanes
- 1999–2001: Parla
- 2001–2003: Humanes
- 2003–2004: Atlético Pinto
- 2006–2007: Getafe B
- 2007–2010: Rayo Vallecano B
- 2010–2012: Rayo Vallecano
- 2012–2014: Sporting Gijón
- 2015–2016: Granada
- 2016: Rayo Vallecano
- 2018: Córdoba
- 2018: Córdoba
- 2020–2021: Fuenlabrada
- 2022: Fuenlabrada
- 2024: Granada

José Ramón Sandoval Huertas (born 2 May 1968) is a Spanish football manager.

== Career ==
=== Early career ===
Madrid-born Sandoval played in the youth sides of Real Madrid for a short period, but had to join CD Humanes as his parents could not take him to trainings. He later represented CD Ciempozuelos, but had to retire at the age of 18 due to a knee injury.

After retiring, Sandoval worked as a cook in his family business while studying to become a manager, and later moved to another family business while coaching his former side Humanes. He subsequently led AD Parla to a promotion to Tercera División before returning to Humanes in 2001.

In the 2003–04 season, Sandoval was in charge of CA Pinto in the fourth tier, and qualified the club to the play-offs for the first time in their history. He was signed by the Madrid Football Federation shortly after, being named manager of the Madrid amateur team and leading the side in the Spanish stage of the UEFA Regions' Cup in 2005.

Sandoval took over Getafe CF B in 2006, and led the side to the play-offs before departing after having discrepancies with the president. He joined Rayo Vallecano B in December 2007, taking the club to runner-up honours in the Copa Federación de España the following year and achieving promotion to Segunda División B for the first time in its history in 2010.

=== Rayo Vallecano ===
For the 2010–11 season, Sandoval was appointed manager of the first team in Segunda División. He helped them return to La Liga after an absence of eight years, and was awarded the Miguel Muñoz Trophy as best manager in the category in the process.

On 25 May 2012, despite managing to narrowly avoid relegation with Rayo in the last round, Sandoval left the club as his contract was not renewed.

=== Sporting Gijón ===
Sandoval returned to the second division on 18 October 2012 after being appointed at Sporting de Gijón, replacing fired Manolo Sánchez. He was sacked on 4 May 2014, with the team in seventh position.

=== Granada ===
On 1 May 2015, Sandoval took charge of Granada CF until the end of the campaign. He managed to collect ten points in only four games, helping the side finally avoid relegation as 17th.

On 22 February 2016, Sandoval was dismissed after losing 1–2 at home to Valencia the day before, and was replaced by José González.

=== Córdoba ===
On 13 February 2018, after more than a year without a club, Sandoval was appointed manager of Córdoba CF. Having managed to avoid relegation, he left the club on 12 June, as his contract expired.

On 3 August 2018, however, Sandoval replaced departing Francisco at the helm of the very same club. He left the Estadio Nuevo Arcángel on 18 November, this time as the board's decision following a 3–1 home loss to Andalusian neighbours Cádiz CF.

=== Fuenlabrada ===
On 11 March 2020, following another lengthy period of inactivity, Sandoval took over for the fired Mere at second-tier newcomers CF Fuenlabrada. On 2 February 2021, he was relieved of his duties.

Sandoval returned to Fuenla on 7 March 2022, replacing the dismissed Sergio Pellicer. Unable to avoid relegation from the second division, he left after the season ended.

=== Granada return ===
On 19 March 2024, after almost two years without a club, Sandoval returned to Granada for a second spell, becoming their third manager of the campaign after Paco López and Alexander Medina. He left on 26 May, after being relegated as joint-last.

== Managerial statistics ==
As of match played 24 May 2024

Managerial record by team and tenure
Team	Nat	From	To	Record								Ref
Team	Nat	From	To	G	W	D	L	GF	GA	GD	Win %	Ref
Humanes	(Spain)	30 June 1996	1 July 1999	102	48	21	33	187	148	+39	47.06	
Parla	(Spain)	1 July 1999	30 June 2001	72	43	12	17	140	76	+64	59.72	
Humanes	(Spain)	30 June 2001	1 July 2003	68	31	17	20	140	118	+22	45.59	
Atlético Pinto	(Spain)	1 July 2003	30 June 2004	40	19	12	9	72	36	+36	47.50	
Getafe B	(Spain)	1 July 2006	1 July 2007	42	20	7	15	56	43	+13	47.62	
Rayo Vallecano B	(Spain)	1 July 2007	20 June 2010	132	60	46	26	177	98	+79	45.45	
Rayo Vallecano	(Spain)	20 June 2010	22 June 2012	84	38	14	32	136	130	+6	45.24	
Sporting Gijón	(Spain)	18 October 2012	4 May 2014	73	27	23	23	109	91	+18	36.99	
Granada	(Spain)	1 May 2015	22 February 2016	33	9	6	18	35	61	−26	27.27	
Rayo Vallecano	(Spain)	27 June 2016	6 November 2016	15	5	4	6	18	18	+0	33.33	
Córdoba	(Spain)	13 February 2018	12 June 2018	16	10	2	4	27	16	+11	62.50	
Córdoba	(Spain)	3 August 2018	18 November 2018	17	4	5	8	23	33	−10	23.53	
Fuenlabrada	(Spain)	11 March 2020	2 February 2021	37	13	16	8	42	34	+8	35.14	
Fuenlabrada	(Spain)	7 March 2022	28 May 2022	12	2	1	9	15	27	−12	16.67	
Granada	(Spain)	19 March 2024	26 May 2024	10	2	1	7	8	21	−13	20.00	
Total				753	331	187	235	1,185	950	+235	43.96	—
