= Silvano Nater =

Portuguese footballer

Personal information
- Full name: Silvano Nater Carungal
- Date of birth: 17 February 2000 (age 26)
- Place of birth: Guinea-Bissau
- Position: Forward

Team information
- Current team: Brühl
- Number: 27

Youth career
- 2017–2019: Atlético Madrid

Senior career*
Years	Team	Apps	(Gls)
2020–2021	Trikala	19	(0)
2021–2022	Unión Adarve	8	(0)
2023–2024	Tres Cantos		
2024	Znojmo	14	(2)
2025	Příbram	8	(1)
2026–	Brühl	11	(0)

International career^{‡}
2018	Portugal U18	3	(0)
- * Club domestic league appearances and goals as of 26 June 2026 ‡ National team caps and goals as of 22 April 2018

Silvano Nater Carungal (born 27 February 2000) is a Portuguese footballer who plays for Swiss Promotion League club Brühl as a forward.

== Football career ==
He made his professional debut for Trikala on 16 January 2021 in the Super League Greece 2.
