= 1991–92 Tercera División =

Tercera División
- Season: 1991–92

The 1991–92 season season is the 15th season since the establishment of the tier four. The competition was played through a 17 groups of 20 teams each. The top four teams of every group played the Segunda División B play-off, while the last three or four teams of every groups were relegated to Divisions regionals.

The season 1991–92 of Tercera División of Spanish football started August 1991 and ended May 1992.

== Group I ==
Pos	Team	Pld	W	D	L	GF	GA	GD	Pts
1	Racing C. de Ferrol	38	23	8	7	82	34	+48	54
2	Celta Turista C.F.	38	19	15	4	61	24	+37	53
3	C.D. Carballiño	38	19	12	7	52	30	+22	50
4	Bergantiños C.F.	38	20	9	9	58	27	+31	49
5	Centro Dep. Barco	38	21	7	10	62	28	+34	49
6	S.D. Burela	38	15	14	9	52	37	+15	44
7	C.D. Estradense	38	15	10	13	33	37	−4	40
8	Órdenes C.F.	38	12	15	11	36	27	+9	39
9	Arosa S.C.	38	13	12	13	47	40	+7	38
10	S.D.C. Mindoniense	38	13	12	13	40	44	−4	38
11	Gondomar C.F.	38	14	9	15	37	54	−17	37
12	Gran Peña F.C.	38	11	15	12	41	46	−5	37
13	Vivero C.F.	38	11	15	12	40	33	+7	37
14	Villalonga C.F.	38	13	11	14	48	44	+4	37
15	Meirás C.F.	38	12	12	14	21	35	−14	36
16	Flavia S.D.	38	9	13	16	29	43	−14	31
17	Alondras C.F.	38	11	8	19	42	58	−16	30
18	Brigantium C.F.	38	6	11	21	33	74	−41	23
19	Coruxo C.F.	38	8	7	23	32	79	−47	23
20	Club Lemos	38	3	9	26	27	79	−52	15

== Group II ==
Pos	Team	Pld	W	D	L	GF	GA	GD	Pts
1	CD Lealtad	38	21	10	7	67	34	+33	52
2	Caudal Deportivo	38	20	11	7	53	23	+30	51
3	UP Langreo	38	19	13	6	58	28	+30	51
4	Club Hispano	38	15	19	4	41	20	+21	49
5	Club Marino	38	18	13	7	51	25	+26	49
6	Real Titánico	38	18	12	8	51	29	+22	48
7	Navia CF	38	17	9	12	57	46	+11	43
8	UD Gijón Industrial	38	12	15	11	32	36	−4	39
9	CD Turón	38	12	14	12	39	49	−10	38
10	Santiago de Aller CF	38	11	14	13	39	39	0	36
11	Candás CF	38	10	16	12	26	37	−11	36
12	Ribadesella CF	38	8	19	11	32	35	−3	35
13	Club Siero	38	6	20	12	31	37	−6	32
14	Pumarín CF	38	12	8	18	38	46	−8	32
15	AD Universidad de Oviedo	38	8	15	15	44	56	−12	31
16	Astur CF	38	8	15	15	25	38	−13	31
17	CD Tuilla	38	8	13	17	39	57	−18	29
18	Lada Langreo	38	8	12	18	31	58	−27	28
19	CD Praviano	38	6	15	17	32	55	−23	27
20	CD San Martín	38	2	19	17	32	70	−38	23

== Group III ==
Pos	Team	Pld	W	D	L	GF	GA	GD	Pts
1	Escobedo	38	24	13	1	65	6	+59	61
2	Marina Cudeyo	38	23	12	3	64	22	+42	58
3	Laredo	38	22	11	5	80	22	+58	55
4	Comillas	38	19	13	6	63	30	+33	51
5	Pontejos	38	16	13	9	40	26	+14	45
6	Castro	38	16	12	10	54	36	+18	44
7	Cayón	38	17	9	12	56	38	+18	43
8	Santoña	38	13	16	9	42	30	+12	42
9	Rayo Cantabria	38	15	9	14	48	43	+5	39
10	Tropezón	38	13	12	13	48	43	+5	38
11	Colindres	38	13	11	14	39	44	−5	37
12	Unión Club	38	14	8	16	31	37	−6	36
13	Selaya	38	10	14	14	43	50	−7	34
14	Barreda	38	13	8	17	34	47	−13	34
15	Ribamontán	38	11	11	16	30	49	−19	33
16	Naval	38	11	9	18	30	47	−17	31
17	Ramales	38	8	14	16	31	61	−30	30
18	Barquereño	38	8	5	25	24	63	−39	21
19	Vimenor	38	5	6	27	24	89	−65	16
20	San Justo	38	3	6	29	29	92	−63	12

== Group IV ==
Pos	Team	Pld	W	D	L	GF	GA	GD	Pts
1	Real Unión	38	25	3	10	63	28	+35	53
2	Beasaín	38	19	14	5	53	21	+32	52
3	Elgóibar	38	17	13	8	52	35	+17	47
4	Amorebieta	38	18	10	10	55	30	+25	46
5	Zalla	38	15	11	12	44	36	+8	41
6	Tolosa	38	15	10	13	41	30	+11	40
7	Santutxu	38	14	11	13	41	36	+5	39
8	Arenas G.	38	13	12	13	28	30	−2	38
9	Aurrerá Ond.	38	13	12	13	37	40	−3	38
10	Cult. Durango	38	14	10	14	37	41	−4	38
11	Gernika	38	12	13	13	27	37	−10	37
12	Mondragón	38	13	11	14	47	50	−3	37
13	Munguía	38	15	7	16	31	36	−5	37
14	Getxo	38	12	12	14	41	40	+1	36
15	Bermeo	38	12	11	15	50	44	+6	35
16	Sodupe	38	11	12	15	43	46	−3	34
17	Galdakao	38	13	7	18	33	41	−8	33
18	Lagún Onak	38	11	10	17	34	46	−12	32
19	Pasajes	38	8	11	19	37	69	−32	27
20	Abetxuko	38	5	10	23	21	79	−58	20

== Group V ==
Pos	Team	Pld	W	D	L	GF	GA	GD	Pts
1	Gramanet	38	23	9	6	70	34	+36	55
2	Balaguer	38	23	8	7	87	38	+49	54
3	Júpiter	38	20	8	10	63	46	+17	48
4	Premiá	38	21	5	12	67	39	+28	47
5	Barcelona C	38	17	10	11	88	50	+38	44
6	Blanes	38	17	10	11	52	41	+11	44
7	Cristinenc	38	14	13	11	50	47	+3	41
8	Granollers	38	13	13	12	51	57	−6	39
9	Igualada	38	17	5	16	61	49	+12	39
10	Vilobí	38	14	10	14	47	47	0	38
11	Manresa	38	14	9	15	56	61	−5	37
12	Tortosa	38	13	9	16	54	60	−6	35
13	Rubí	38	14	7	17	56	59	−3	35
14	Roda Barà	38	10	14	14	41	44	−3	34
15	Martinenc	38	13	8	17	48	56	−8	34
16	Europa	38	10	14	14	40	55	−15	34
17	Banyoles	38	10	13	15	43	61	−18	33
18	Horta	38	8	12	18	40	66	−26	28
19	Olot	38	7	7	24	33	78	−45	21
20	Sant Cugat	38	8	4	26	39	98	−59	20

== Group VI ==
=== North ===
Pos	Team	Pld	W	D	L	GF	GA	GD	Pts
1	Valencia B	34	27	6	1	90	19	+71	60
2	Lliria	34	19	7	8	57	34	+23	45
3	Sueca	34	17	11	6	49	32	+17	45
4	Saguntino	34	17	10	7	53	34	+19	44
5	Foyos	34	15	9	10	39	38	+1	39
6	Alacuás	34	12	14	8	39	28	+11	38
7	Carcaixent	34	15	6	13	42	48	−6	36
8	Acero	34	14	8	12	45	41	+4	36
9	Almazora	34	12	11	11	39	37	+2	35
10	Vall de Uxó	34	10	15	9	34	32	+2	35
11	Onda	34	12	11	11	39	36	+3	35
12	Betxí	34	8	16	10	32	32	0	32
13	Paiporta	34	10	10	14	41	41	0	30
14	Vinaroz	34	9	7	18	40	56	−16	25
15	Paterna	34	6	11	17	26	51	−25	23
16	Burriana	34	5	10	19	22	46	−24	20
17	Ribarroja	34	4	10	20	27	68	−41	18
18	Cullera	34	5	6	23	26	67	−41	16

=== South ===
Pos	Team	Pld	W	D	L	GF	GA	GD	Pts
1	Eldense	34	20	9	5	47	19	+28	49
2	Horadada	34	18	10	6	57	35	+22	46
3	Onteniente	34	17	11	6	46	21	+25	45
4	Villena	34	14	15	5	57	30	+27	43
5	Calpe	34	17	9	8	46	33	+13	43
6	Pinoso	34	14	15	5	39	21	+18	43
7	Jávea	34	15	12	7	46	25	+21	42
8	Villajoyosa	34	13	13	8	54	42	+12	39
9	Ilicitano	34	14	9	11	50	36	+14	37
10	Olímpic	34	12	13	9	46	37	+9	37
11	Pego	34	8	14	12	35	35	0	30
12	Aspense	34	7	12	15	31	46	−15	26
13	Canals	34	7	12	15	34	44	−10	26
14	Alicante	34	5	15	14	31	44	−13	25
15	Albatera	34	6	12	16	23	60	−37	24
16	Ollería	34	4	15	15	18	38	−20	23
17	Denia	34	6	9	19	29	54	−25	21
18	Monóvar	34	2	9	23	17	86	−69	13

== Group VII ==
Pos	Team	Pld	W	D	L	GF	GA	GD	Pts
1	Real Madrid C	38	23	10	5	74	29	+45	56
2	Aranjuez CF	38	20	11	7	60	31	+29	51
3	CD Móstoles	38	22	5	11	74	45	+29	49
4	RSD Alcalá	38	19	9	10	54	41	+13	47
5	CF Rayo Majadahonda	38	18	10	10	58	43	+15	46
6	SR Villaverde BCF	38	14	14	10	57	48	+9	42
7	CD Colonia Moscardó	38	13	16	9	58	45	+13	42
8	AD Torrejón	38	14	13	11	52	59	−7	41
9	CD Pegaso	38	15	10	13	49	45	+4	40
10	CF Fuenlabrada	38	14	11	13	41	39	+2	39
11	AD Parla	38	13	11	14	44	49	−5	37
12	CD Carabanchel	38	12	13	13	39	42	−3	37
13	Rayo Vallecano B	38	13	11	14	52	55	−3	37
14	CD San Fernando	38	10	16	12	39	37	+2	36
15	CD Vicálvaro	38	11	10	17	46	54	−8	32
16	UD San S. de los Reyes	38	10	12	16	30	45	−15	32
17	CD Las Rozas	38	12	7	19	50	61	−11	31
18	CDA Navalcarnero	38	9	11	18	39	62	−23	29
19	AD Alcobendas	38	7	10	21	38	54	−16	24
20	Atlético Valdemoro	38	2	8	28	33	103	−70	12

== Group VIII ==
Pos	Team	Pld	W	D	L	GF	GA	GD	Pts
1	C.At. Bembibre	38	21	8	9	61	34	+27	50
2	At. Astorga F.C.	38	17	15	6	56	30	+26	49
3	Zamora C.F.	38	20	7	11	57	45	+12	47
4	C. Cult. León	38	14	18	6	64	41	+23	46
5	C.D. Salmantino	38	18	10	10	57	36	+21	46
6	S.D. Almazán	38	16	14	8	56	40	+16	46
7	S.D. Gim. Segoviana	38	17	9	12	50	42	+8	43
8	Whisky Dyc	38	15	13	10	56	34	+22	43
9	C.D. Venta Baños	38	17	9	12	52	48	+4	43
10	La Bañeza F.C.	38	17	8	13	52	49	+3	42
11	At. Burgalés	38	16	9	13	60	59	+1	41
12	Racing Lermeño C.F.	38	12	13	13	55	52	+3	37
13	S.D. Hullera V.L.	38	13	11	14	41	44	−3	37
14	C.D. Béjar Ind.	38	14	8	16	43	42	+1	36
15	Sporting C. Uxama	38	13	8	17	44	59	−15	34
16	S.D. Gim. Medinense	38	8	13	17	29	46	−17	29
17	Arandina C.F.	38	8	12	18	39	54	−15	28
18	C.F. Endesa Ponf.	38	8	7	23	25	46	−21	23
19	S.D. Fabero	38	7	8	23	36	77	−41	22
20	C.F. Briviesca	38	5	8	25	33	88	−55	18

== Group IX ==
Pos	Team	Pld	W	D	L	GF	GA	GD	Pts
1	Vélez C.F.	36	25	4	7	70	41	+29	54
2	C.D. Mármol Macael	36	23	5	8	69	24	+45	51
3	Iliturgi C.F.	36	22	7	7	49	20	+29	51
4	C. At. Malagueño	36	22	7	7	72	31	+41	51
5	Pol. Almería	36	19	11	6	59	28	+31	49
6	Baeza C.F.	36	17	7	12	48	42	+6	41
7	Martos C.D.	36	14	11	11	42	39	+3	39
8	Motril C.F.	36	15	8	13	46	47	−1	38
9	Atarfe Ind. C.F.	36	14	10	12	66	46	+20	38
10	Granada B	36	14	9	13	49	48	+1	37
11	A.D. Adra	36	14	9	13	45	33	+12	37
12	U.D. San Pedro	36	13	10	13	48	46	+2	36
13	U.D. Maracena	36	14	4	18	46	46	0	32
14	Úbeda C.F.	36	12	7	17	50	52	−2	31
15	Guadix C.F.	36	11	8	17	42	46	−4	30
16	Juventud Torremolinos	36	8	6	22	34	66	−32	22
17	C.D. Ronda	36	6	7	23	31	76	−45	19
18	C.D. Nerja	36	4	8	24	23	91	−68	16
19	C.D. Mijas	36	3	6	27	18	85	−67	10 (Note: 2 penalty points)
20	Melilla B (retired)	0	0	0	0	0	0	0	0

== Group X ==
Pos	Team	Pld	W	D	L	GF	GA	GD	Pts
1	Sevilla F.C. B	38	22	10	6	65	25	+40	54
2	Écija Balompié	38	21	10	7	67	22	+45	52
3	C.D. San Roque	38	20	9	9	64	36	+28	49
4	Algeciras C.F.	38	19	11	8	56	28	+28	49
5	San Juan	38	15	15	8	50	34	+16	45
6	C.D. Mairena	38	16	12	10	52	42	+10	44
7	C.D. Pozoblanco	38	18	7	13	50	33	+17	43
8	C.D. Lebrija	38	16	11	11	47	41	+6	43
9	U.D. Los Palacios	38	14	13	11	54	41	+13	41
10	U.D. Roteña	38	15	9	14	54	56	−2	39
11	Coria C.F.	38	15	8	15	55	46	+9	38
12	Jerez Ind. C.F.	38	15	8	15	39	44	−5	38
13	Montilla C.F.	38	14	8	16	38	41	−3	36
14	C. At. Lucentino Ind.	38	10	13	15	42	55	−13	33
15	Chiclana C.F.	38	11	9	18	52	60	−8	31
16	Cádiz C.F. B	38	8	14	16	37	52	−15	30
17	At. Palma del Río	38	7	13	18	32	64	−32	27
18	C.D. San Fernando	38	8	10	20	30	58	−28	26
19	Santaella C.F.	38	10	4	24	29	74	−45	24
20	C.At. Ceuta	38	4	10	24	25	86	−61	18

== Group XI ==
Pos	Team	Pld	W	D	L	GF	GA	GD	Pts
1	SD Ibiza	38	29	6	3	78	16	+62	64
2	CD Manacor	38	26	2	10	59	30	+29	54
3	CD Atlético Baleares	38	22	9	7	61	36	+25	53
4	Mallorca Atlético	38	21	10	7	59	31	+28	52
5	S.D. Portmany	38	19	7	12	45	40	+5	45
6	C.D. Playas Calviá	38	17	11	10	63	34	+29	45
7	C.D. Ferriolense	38	16	10	12	52	41	+11	42
8	CF Sóller	38	17	7	14	56	38	+18	41
9	C.D. Cardessar	38	15	10	13	46	46	0	40
10	C.D. Cala Millor	38	13	13	12	50	41	+9	39
11	CD Alayor	38	13	9	16	48	46	+2	35
12	Santa Eulàlia	38	11	12	15	42	44	−2	34
13	C.D. Ferrerías	38	10	12	16	45	45	0	32
14	C.D. Llosetense	38	10	12	16	47	60	−13	32
15	UD Arenal	38	10	12	16	43	39	+4	32
16	Son Roca	38	12	8	18	35	44	−9	32
17	UD Poblense	38	9	12	17	39	45	−6	30
18	C.D. España Lluchmayor	38	10	6	22	38	68	−30	26
19	U.D. Seislán	38	9	5	24	31	60	−29	23
20	CD Cala d'Or	38	2	5	31	15	148	−133	9

== Group XII ==
Pos	Team	Pld	W	D	L	GF	GA	GD	Pts
1	U.D. Las Palmas B	38	27	5	6	86	30	+56	59
2	C.D. Mensajero	38	23	5	10	67	30	+37	51
3	U.D. Orotava	38	22	7	9	69	33	+36	51
4	U.D. Gáldar	38	18	12	8	52	43	+9	48
5	U.D. Telde	38	19	8	11	67	43	+24	46
6	C.D. Arguineguín	38	18	5	15	51	53	−2	41
7	U.D. Realejos	38	17	6	15	56	49	+7	40
8	U.D. Güimar	38	15	9	14	45	42	+3	39
9	S.D. Tenisca	38	15	9	14	53	60	−7	39
10	Real Artesano F.C.	38	14	10	14	43	53	−10	38
11	U.D. Salud	38	12	12	14	51	48	+3	36
12	C.D. Corralejo	38	14	8	16	55	52	+3	36
13	U.D. Aridane	38	13	8	17	49	47	+2	34
14	U.D. Ibarra	38	12	9	17	36	41	−5	33
15	U.D. Vecindario	38	13	7	18	39	62	−23	33
16	A.D. Laguna	38	13	6	19	44	52	−8	32
17	C.D. Unión Tejina	38	10	10	18	35	51	−16	30
18	U.D. Icodense	38	10	6	22	37	59	−22	26
19	C.D. I'Gara	38	6	13	19	31	74	−43	25
20	Ferreras C.F.	38	6	11	21	32	76	−44	23

== Group XIII ==
Pos	Team	Pld	W	D	L	GF	GA	GD	Pts
1	C.D. Beniel	38	21	12	5	53	23	+30	54
2	Águilas C.F.	38	23	7	8	73	30	+43	53
3	Imperial C.F.	38	20	13	5	54	22	+32	53
4	C.F. Santomera	38	19	12	7	62	41	+21	50
5	Caravaca C.F.	38	17	14	7	46	32	+14	48
6	Lorca Deportiva	38	19	5	14	65	41	+24	43
7	C.D. Cieza Prom.	38	16	10	12	54	45	+9	42
8	A.D. Mar Menor	38	14	13	11	45	40	+5	41
9	Jumilla C.F.	38	15	11	12	49	41	+8	41
10	Fuente Álamo C.F.	38	14	10	14	56	53	+3	38
11	C.D. Cieza	38	12	10	16	37	41	−4	34
12	Pinatar C.F.	38	9	15	14	31	40	−9	33
13	Muleño C.F.	38	10	13	15	34	45	−11	33
14	A.D. San Miguel	38	11	10	17	35	52	−17	32
15	Abarán C.F.	38	11	10	17	46	60	−14	32
16	Cehegín C.F.	38	10	11	17	38	54	−16	31
17	Olímpico Totana C.F.	38	10	10	18	30	48	−18	30
18	C.D. Alberca	38	9	11	18	32	61	−29	29
19	Barinas C.F.	38	9	8	21	36	60	−24	26
20	C.D. Algar	38	4	9	25	29	76	−47	17

== Group XIV ==
Pos	Team	Pld	W	D	L	GF	GA	GD	Pts
1	U.P. Plasencia	38	28	6	4	86	18	+68	62
2	C.P. Cacereño	38	26	6	6	89	21	+68	58
3	Moralo C.P.	38	25	8	5	59	22	+37	58
4	C.D. Don Benito	38	24	10	4	84	17	+67	58
5	C. Cristian Lay	38	20	7	11	73	43	+30	47
6	U.D. Mérida Prom.	38	17	12	9	66	40	+26	46
7	U.D. Montijo	38	18	8	12	55	34	+21	44
8	A.D. Llerenense	38	15	11	12	50	44	+6	41
9	C.D. Badajoz Prom.	38	16	7	15	59	48	+11	39
10	C.D. Miajadas	38	14	11	13	48	42	+6	39
11	U. Cult. La Estrella	38	12	12	14	45	50	−5	36
12	C.D. Castuera	38	16	4	18	45	65	−20	36
13	C.D. Díter Zafra	38	12	11	15	42	57	−15	35
14	S.P. Villafranca	38	11	11	16	42	56	−14	33
15	C.D. Azuaga	38	10	10	18	36	62	−26	30
16	C.D. San Serván	38	13	4	21	42	71	−29	30
17	C.P. Cetarsa Talayuela	38	9	10	19	41	64	−23	28
18	C.P. Cabezuela	38	4	8	26	40	98	−58	16
19	C.D. Orellana	38	4	7	27	26	82	−56	15
20	R.C. Valverdeño	38	2	5	31	25	119	−94	9

== Group XV ==
Pos	Team	Pld	W	D	L	GF	GA	GD	Pts
1	C.D. Calahorra	38	24	10	4	72	28	+44	58
2	C.D. Izarra	38	21	15	2	54	20	+34	57
3	C.At. Artajonés	38	21	6	11	71	46	+25	48
4	C.D. Peña Sport	38	17	14	7	56	27	+29	48
5	C.D. Mirandés	38	15	13	10	51	25	+26	43
6	C.D. Alfaro	38	14	14	10	51	38	+13	42
7	C.D. Azkoyen	38	13	15	10	51	51	0	41
8	C.D. Beti Onak	38	14	12	12	41	44	−3	40
9	U.C.D. Burladés	38	13	12	13	45	38	+7	38
10	U.D. Cult. Chantrea	38	14	10	14	46	45	+1	38
11	C.D. Arnedo	38	13	11	14	42	46	−4	37
12	C.D. Egüés	38	13	11	14	50	54	−4	37
13	C.D. Oberena	38	12	10	16	43	57	−14	34
14	C.D. River Ebro	38	8	17	13	38	48	−10	33
15	CD Ribaforada	38	10	13	15	30	44	−14	33
16	C. Haro Deportivo	38	10	11	17	36	47	−11	31
17	C.D. San Adrián	38	7	16	15	31	48	−17	30
18	C.D. Berceo	38	8	14	16	30	47	−17	30
19	C.D. Autol	38	6	12	20	28	61	−33	24
20	Yagüe C.F.	38	5	8	25	44	96	−52	18

== Group XVI ==
Pos	Team	Pld	W	D	L	GF	GA	GD	Pts
1	Endesa Andorra	38	25	10	3	96	22	+74	60
2	Barbastro	38	23	9	6	73	28	+45	55
3	Utebo	38	22	11	5	64	25	+39	55
4	Hernán Cortés	38	20	13	5	80	32	+48	53
5	Monzón	38	18	14	6	61	35	+26	50
6	Ejea	38	16	11	11	50	38	+12	43
7	Teruel	38	17	9	12	48	45	+3	43
8	Sabiñánigo	38	17	9	12	62	40	+22	43
9	Monzalbarba	38	15	12	11	53	39	+14	42
10	Ebro	38	16	9	13	52	53	−1	41
11	Sariñena	38	16	6	16	46	53	−7	38
12	Alcolea	38	14	7	17	41	59	−18	35
13	Caspe	38	12	10	16	54	67	−13	34
14	Mallén	38	10	13	15	36	54	−18	33
15	Santa Isabel	38	9	11	18	36	57	−21	29
16	Peralta	38	9	7	22	35	75	−40	25
17	Tauste	38	8	7	23	40	78	−38	23
18	Alcorisa	38	7	8	23	36	66	−30	22
19	Calatayud	38	6	10	22	34	69	−35	22
20	Utrillas	38	5	4	29	30	92	−62	14

== Group XVII ==
Pos	Team	Pld	W	D	L	GF	GA	GD	Pts
1	CD Toledo	38	24	9	5	93	21	+72	57
2	UB Conquense	38	22	12	4	63	28	+35	56
3	Talavera CF	38	23	9	6	67	22	+45	55
4	Gimnástico Alcázar	38	18	13	7	52	27	+25	49
5	CP Villarrobledo	38	16	12	10	55	40	+15	44
6	CD Guadalajara	38	18	8	12	62	37	+25	44
7	Atlético Albacete	38	18	8	12	51	31	+20	44
8	AD Campillo	38	15	11	12	41	41	0	41
9	CD Los Yébenes	38	15	9	14	58	52	+6	39
10	Atlético La Solana	38	13	13	12	45	39	+6	39
11	Puertollano Industrial	38	15	9	14	44	51	−7	39
12	UD Socuéllamos	38	14	11	13	49	51	−2	39
13	CD Azuqueca	38	16	6	16	53	50	+3	38
14	Motilla CF	38	12	12	14	49	47	+2	36
15	AD Tarancón	38	13	10	15	47	51	−4	36
16	Manzanares CF	38	13	8	17	56	52	+4	34
17	Atlético Pedro Muñoz	38	10	11	17	35	39	−4	31
18	Sporting Quintanar	38	6	7	25	26	88	−62	19
19	Daimiel CF	38	7	3	28	25	67	−42	17
20	Herencia CF	38	0	3	35	14	151	−137	3
