= CDE Trival Valderas Promesas Alcorcón =

Association football club in Spain

Trival Valderas Promesas
- Full name: Club Deportivo Elemental Trival Valderas Promesas Alcorcón
- Founded: 1969 (as CDC Comercial); 2016 (as Móstoles Balompié)
- Ground: La Aldehuela, Fuenlabrada, Madrid, Spain
- Capacity: 2,000
- Chairman: Jonathan Praena
- Manager: Sebas Martínez
- League: Primera Autonómica de Aficionados – Group 2
- 2025–26: Primera Autonómica de Aficionados – Group 2, 7th of 18
Home colours	Away colours

Club Deportivo Elemental Trival Valderas Promesas Alcorcón is a Spanish football team based in Madrid, in the autonomous community of Madrid. Founded in 1969, it plays in Primera Autonómica de Aficionados – Group 2, holding home games at Campo Municipal La Aldehuela, with a capacity of 2,000 people.

== History ==
Flat Earth FC logo

Móstoles Balompié was formed in 2016, as the club took the place of CDC Comercial (club founded in 1969 and federated in 1983), who was at the time a reserve team of RCD Carabanchel. The club achieved promotion to the Preferente (fifth tier) in their first season, and promoted to Tercera División in 2019.

In late June 2019, Móstoles Balompié reached international attention after their president Javi Poves opted to change the club's name to Flat Earth FC, and publicly endorsed modern flat Earth beliefs. The club also moved from the Madrid suburbs of Móstoles to the city of Madrid.

In December 2020, Poves resigned from his president role. The club was later renamed CD Elemental Madrid 2021.

On 6 July 2021, Flat Earth was bought out by CF Fuenlabrada and became their reserve team, being renamed CF Fuenlabrada Promesas and taking their place in the new Tercera División RFEF. The club's former B-side, CF Fuenlabrada B, became the second reserve team.

In July 2026, Fuenlabrada Promesas' structure was absorbed by CF Trival Valderas, becoming CDE Trival Valderas Promesas Alcorcón.

=== Club background ===
- CDC Comercial (1969–2016)
- Móstoles Balompié (2016–2019)
- Flat Earth Fútbol Club (2019–2021)
- Club de Fútbol Fuenlabrada Promesas Madrid 2021 (2021–2024)
- Club Deportivo Elemental Fuenlabrada Promesas Vivero (2024–2026)
- Club Deportivo Elemental Trival Valderas Promesas Alcorcón (2026–)

== Season to season ==
=== CDC Comercial ===
Season	Tier	Division	Place	Copa del Rey
1987–88	8	3ª Reg.	11th	
1988–89	8	3ª Reg.	11th	
1989–90	8	3ª Reg.	4th	
1990–91	8	3ª Reg.	9th	
1991–92	8	3ª Reg.	5th	
1992–93	8	3ª Reg.	13th	
1993–94	8	3ª Reg.	14th	
1994–95	8	3ª Reg.	6th	
1995–96	8	3ª Reg.	15th	
1996–97	8	3ª Reg.	16th	
1997–98	8	3ª Reg.	8th	
1998–99	8	3ª Reg.	15th	
1999–2000	8	3ª Reg.	13th	
2000–01	8	3ª Reg.	12th	
2001–02	8	3ª Reg.	13th	

Season	Tier	Division	Place	Copa del Rey
2002–03	8	3ª Reg.	13th	
2003–04	8	3ª Reg.	5th	
2004–05	8	3ª Reg.	12th	
2005–06	8	3ª Reg.	14th	
2006–07	8	3ª Reg.	2nd	
2007–08	7	2ª Reg.	10th	
2008–09	7	2ª Reg.	2nd	
2009–10	6	1ª Afic.	12th	
2010–11	6	1ª Afic.	18th	
2011–12	7	2ª Afic.	1st	
2012–13	6	1ª Afic.	13th	
2013–14	6	1ª Afic.	11th	
2014–15	6	1ª Afic.	5th	
2015–16	6	1ª Afic.	2nd	

=== Móstoles Balompié ===
Season	Tier	Division	Place	Copa del Rey
2016–17	6	1ª Afic.	1st	
2017–18	5	Pref.	12th	
2018–19	5	Pref.	2nd	

=== Flat Earth ===
Season	Tier	Division	Place	Copa del Rey
2019–20	4	3ª	10th	
2020–21	4	3ª	5th / 3rd	

=== Fuenlabrada Promesas ===
Season	Tier	Division	Place
2021–22	5	3ª RFEF	3rd
2022–23	5	3ª Fed.	15th
2023–24	6	Pref.	5th
2024–25	6	1ª Aut.	9th
2025–26	6	1ª Aut.	7th

=== Trival Valderas Promesas ===
Season	Tier	Division	Place
2026–27	6	1ª Aut.	

- 2 seasons in Tercera División
- 2 seasons in Tercera Federación/Tercera División RFEF
