= AF Alcobendas-Gandarío =

Spanish football club

Alcobendas-Gandarío
- Full name: Club Deportivo Elemental Academia de Fútbol Alcobendas-Gandarío
- Nickname: Gandarío
- Founded: 2001
- Ground: Dehesa Vieja, S.S. de los Reyes, Community of Madrid, Spain
- Capacity: 1,000
- Chairman: María Isabel Gómez
- Manager: Augusto Acevedo
- League: Primera de Aficionados – Group 2
- 2025–26: Segunda de Aficionados – Group 3, 1st of 16 (champions)
Home colours	Away colours

Club Deportivo Elemental Academia de Fútbol Alcobendas-Gandarío is a football club based in San Sebastián de los Reyes in the autonomous Community of Madrid. Founded in 2001, it plays in the Primera de Aficionados – Group 2. Its stadium is Polideportivo Dehesa Vieja with a capacity of 1,000 seats.

== History ==
=== Club background ===
- Club de Fútbol Gandarío-Movistar (2001–2003)
- Club de Fútbol Gandarío (2003–2004)
- Club de Fútbol Gandarío-Sanse (2004–2017)
- Club Deportivo Elemental Academia de Fútbol Alcobendas-Gandarío (2017–)

== Season to season ==
Season	Tier	Division	Place	Copa del Rey
2001–02	8	3ª Reg.	5th	
2002–03	8	3ª Reg.	3rd	
2003–04	7	2ª Reg.	9th	
2004–05	7	2ª Reg.	8th	
2005–06	7	2ª Reg.	4th	
2006–07	7	2ª Reg.	2nd	
2007–08	6	1ª Reg.	1st	
2008–09	5	Reg. Pref.	16th	
2009–10	6	1ª Afic.	5th	
2010–11	6	1ª Afic.	4th	
2011–12	6	1ª Afic.	3rd	
2012–13	5	Pref.	18th	
2013–14	6	1ª Afic.	6th	
2014–15	6	1ª Afic.	12th	
2015–16	6	1ª Afic.	14th	
2016–17	6	1ª Afic.	8th	
2017–18	6	1ª Afic.	14th	
2018–19	6	1ª Afic.	16th	
2019–20	7	2ª Afic.	15th	
2020–21	7	2ª Afic.	11th	

Season	Tier	Division	Place	Copa del Rey
2021–22	8	2ª Afic.	11th	
2022–23	8	2ª Afic.	16th	
2023–24	9	3ª Afic.	1st	
2024–25	8	1ª Afic.	16th	
2025–26	9	2ª Afic.	1st	
2026–27	8	1ª Afic.		
