= CD Guadalajara (Spain) =

Spanish football club

Guadalajara
- Full name: Club Deportivo Guadalajara, S.A.D.
- Nicknames: Guada; Dépor Guada; Dépor; Deportivo; Morados (Purples)
- Founded: 4 January 1947; 79 years ago
- Stadium: Estadio Pedro Escartín
- Capacity: 6,000
- Owner: Rovirosa Desarrollos SL
- President: Carlos Ávila
- Head coach: Miguel Flaño
- League: Segunda Federación – Group 5
- 2025–26: Primera Federación – Group 1, 18th of 20 (relegated)
- Website: cdguadalajara.es
Home colours	Away colours

Club Deportivo Guadalajara, S.A.D. is a Spanish football club based in Guadalajara, in the autonomous community of Castilla–La Mancha. Founded in 1947 it currently plays in Segunda Federación – Group 5, holding home matches at Estadio Pedro Escartín, with a capacity for 6,000 seats.

== History ==
=== First Steps ===
Guadalajara was founded on 4 January 1947. It was a group of friends who played on the soccer team of Educación y Descanso, a Franco regime program for young people, and the Frente de Juventudes. So, based on this seed, a club was created that was independent of all these organizations.

On January 4, a meeting was held in the Education and Recreation halls that would be the seed of Deportivo Guadalajara. From that meeting, a committee was formed consisting of Francisco Nicolás, Ignacio Burgos, Jaime Pujades, José Mª Moreno, Cayetano Morán, Carlos Camargo, Manuel Herrero, Antonio Vicenti, and Rafael Aguilar. The latter was elected president at first, but he gave up the position to Jaume Pujades. The club was thus founded, with the founding minutes being drawn up on January 30, 1947. The club was registered with the Castilian Football Federation on February 5 of that same year.

This committee would also choose the club's kit. The purple shirt and white shorts were chosen as the home kit. The red shirt and blue shorts were chosen as the away kit. Interestingly, the away kit was loaned by the Spain national football team.

On January 19, 1947, Deportivo Guadalajara played its first match. It was a friendly match in which it defeated Bar Ideal by a resounding 9-1.

On January 26, 1947, he played his first official match, beating Real Ávila CF 2-1 in the amateur championship.

In the 1947–48 season, it began competing in the First Regional Division, achieving promotion to the Tercera División the following season.

The 1950-51 season ended with the team in second place, qualifying for the promotion phase to the Second Division. In this phase, they faced Recreativo de Huelva, Real Betis, Alicante, Cacereño, and Atlético Baleares. One of the matches was broadcast live by Matías Prats, which was a major event for the city. The cost of traveling to the Balearic Islands was somewhat painful, according to people close to the club, and some players even had to pawn their socks and clothes to pay for the trip.

During the 1950s, Deportivo Guadalajara established itself in the Tercera División, remaining in that category without interruption until 1962, when it was relegated to the regional league for the first time.

On May 2, 1956, Deportivo Guadalajara played its first international match against the German team Grundig Fürth.

During this period, two players who later became famous and went on to play internationally in the 1960s wore the team's jersey: Isacio Calleja and Carlos Lapetra. Another player who stood out during this period was Juan José Laso, who would later become president of the club for 27 years.

=== A team without a home field ===
After being relegated in 1962, the club managed to return to the Tercera División the following year. However, just two years later, in 1965, the club was on the verge of collapse when it lost its home ground. That year, the “Campo del Productor” was demolished, which meant that for the next two seasons (1965-66 and 1966-67) the club stopped competing.

In 1967, Deportivo Guadalajara inaugurated its new home, the “Campo del Henares”. and returned to competition. The new stadium was built in an area with poor access and no water supply—water had to be transported in an old cistern to tanks located on the hillside opposite the stands so that the players could shower. Over time, the various areas of the stadium were improved, and in 1974 it was renamed the Campo de Fútbol Pedro Escartín (in honour of Pedro Escartín, former referee).

Simultaneously with this forced relocation, matters did not go well in the sporting arena either. The same season that the new stadium was inaugurated, the team would end up being relegated to the regional league.

=== Yo-yo club ===
Over the next six seasons, Guadalajara competed in the regional league. In 1973, after beating SD Huesca in the promotion play-offs, it managed to return to the Tercera División. In its absence, the Tercera División had gone from having 14 groups in the 1967-68 season to only four in 1970-71, with a consequent increase in difficulty. The team was placed in Group II, alongside teams such as Deportivo Alavés, Logroñés, Real Madrid Castilla, Atlético Madrileño, Osasuna, and Getafe. It achieved a more than commendable eighth place, although this would be the prelude to a poor season the following year, which included relegation.

During this period, Deportivo Guadalajara became a yo-yo team. It only lasted two seasons in the Tercera División before being relegated again. In 1975, it was relegated, returning to the Tercera División the following year after beating Villarreal in the promotion play-offs; in 1978, it was relegated again, returning to the Tercera División two seasons later; and in 1982, it was relegated once more, regaining its place in the division the following year.

In 1975, the first edition of the Trofeo Alcarria was held. A year later, they were crowned champions of the Campeonato de Castilla Amateur after beating Leganés on penalties.

=== The Tercera División pit ===
Since 1983, Deportivo Guadalajara has remained in the Tercera División for 23 consecutive seasons.

On 18 July 1985, on the day of the club hymn's official presentation, the club first appeared in the Copa del Rey, against Rayo Vallecano. It would spend the first sixty years of its existence in the fourth division and the regional leagues.

In the 1986-87 season, after the Tercera División was divided by autonomous regions, it was placed in Group XVII (later Group XVIII), the Castilla–La Mancha group. This first season was disastrous. It finished last with only three wins, eight draws, 27 losses, 31 goals scored, and a whopping 108 goals conceded, earning a meager 14 points. However, it was lucky in the promotion play-off against Unión Criptanense, a team it beat on penalties.

Despite this difficult season, in the following years Guadalajara would consolidate its position as one of the leading teams in its group, setting itself the goal of promotion to Segunda División B. On six occasions (1989, 1991, 1998, 1999, 2003, and 2006), Deportivo Guadalajara unsuccessfully competed in the promotion phase to that division.

During all these years in which the dream of promotion was unsuccessfully pursued, the club continued to transform itself. Thus, at the end of 1998, with Juan José Laso Rhodes as president, the club became a Sociedad Anónima Deportiva; and in 2001, local businessman Germán Retuerta took over the club.

In 2006, it came close to promotion, as after beating CD Don Benito in the first round, it succumbed to Granada in extra time in the final round.

The following year, the curse was broken. They beat CD Tropezón in the first round, and in the final round they defeated UD Las Palmas B 2-1 in the first leg at the Estadio Pedro Escartín. On July 24, 2007, after drawing 1-1 in the second leg at the Estadio Pepe Gonçalvez in Las Palmas de Gran Canaria, Deportivo Guadalajara became a new Segunda División B team. Guadalajara was no longer the only Spanish province that had never had at least one team in Segunda División B.

=== The best Dépor ever ===
In August 2007, Deportivo Guadalajara made its debut in Segunda B against Peña Sport. It finished the 2007-08 season in a commendable eighth place, remaining in contention for the promotion playoffs until the very end.

Club crest used from 2002 to 2021

In the 2008-09 season, he was placed in the southern group (group IV), where he finished in ninth place.

The following season (2009-10), it finished in third place, surpassed only by Alcorcón and Real Oviedo. This meant qualifying for the next edition of the Copa del Rey—which it had not played in for eighteen years—and for the playoffs to move up to the Segunda División. In the first round of the promotion playoffs (quarterfinals), they were defeated by Ontinyent.

The 2010–11 season began with participation in the Copa del Rey. In the first round, they eliminated Pontevedra; however, they were defeated by Ceuta in the second round.

Following a somewhat tentative initiation to the league championship, the arrival of Carlos Terrazas on the sidelines prompted a notable response from the team. This response, coupled with a remarkable second half of the season, culminated in the team securing a second-place finish, surpassed only by Lugo.

In the first promotion playoff, they beat Orihuela CF, and in the second playoff, they beat Sevilla Atlético. In the third and final round, they fought against CD Mirandés for a spot in the Second Division. Despite losing (0-1) in the first leg played at Pedro Escartín on June 26, 2011, after beating (1-2) the Burgos team at the Anduva Stadium, the purple team achieved the greatest milestone in its history, promotion to the Segunda División.

On August 27, 2011, in a match against UD Las Palmas, the team made its official debut in the Segunda División. The team got off to a surprisingly positive start and was leading the league on the sixth match day despite being a “rookie.” However, it then entered a negative spiral that forced it to focus on avoiding relegation. Finally, it secured its place in the division with three games to go, beating Elche CF 2-3.

=== Administrative relegation ===
For its second season in the division, the club set itself the goal of reaching the promotion playoffs to the Primera División. In order to achieve this goal, the squad underwent a major overhaul, with only five players from the previous season remaining. The lack of cohesion among the new signings meant that the start of the season was disastrous, with the team occupying last place for several matchdays: of the first 21 points, they only managed to secure one (a draw away to Alcorcón on the first matchday).

From October onwards, the team began to achieve positive results and, before the Christmas break, climbed out of the relegation zone. After the break, the positive results continued and the team continued to climb the table towards mid-table.

However, in February, news broke that would end up defining the season: the LFP accused the club of irregularities in the capital increase that took place the previous summer. In light of these events, it decided to open an administrative case against the club and file a complaint against President Retuerta.

The team managed to isolate itself from this and other non-sporting problems (such as the complaint of improper alignment filed by UD Las Palmas, which would later be dismissed), continued to achieve positive results, and secured its place in the league with two games to go in the match against Racing Santander at El Sardinero Stadium.

On 4 June 2013, shortly before the second division season was over, Guadalajara was dropped back to the third category after a two-year spell even though it eventually finished above the relegation zone, due to alleged financial irregularities.

Days after securing its place in the league, the LFP described the events that had led to the opening of proceedings against the club as very serious and decreed its relegation. After both the LFP and the CSD rejected the various appeals lodged against this decision, the Alcarreño club decided to take the matter to the ordinary courts. On August 1, 2013, pending the courts' decision in September on whether or not to adopt precautionary measures, the club's board of directors decided to register the team in Segunda División B.

=== Again Segunda B and Tercera ===
In the 2013-2014 season, Guadalajara returned to Segunda B and finished fifth in the fourth group of that category, thus coming close to the promotion play-off positions.

In the 2014-15 season, it was placed in group II of Segunda B, finishing in third place at the end of the regular season and failing to gain promotion in the promotion play-offs.

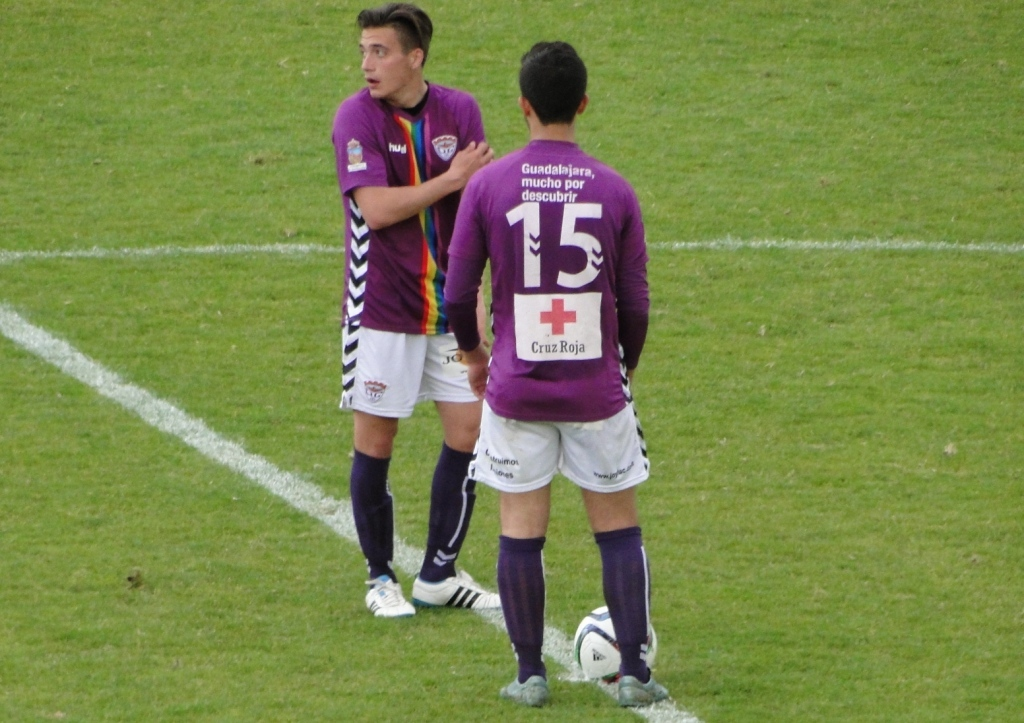
Guadalajara players during a Segunda División B match against Real Unión.

In the 2015-16 season, it was relegated to the Tercera División under the leadership of Manolo Cano, Félix Arnaiz Lucas, and the media-savvy David Vidal.

In the 2016-17 season, it began a new journey in Tercera División, playing in Group XVIII under the leadership of Alberto Parras, qualifying fourth for the promotion playoffs but ultimately failing to achieve promotion after losing the tie to CA Cirbonero.

In the final stretch of the 2017-18 season, the club began to experience financial turmoil that led to bankruptcy proceedings in which creditors claimed more than two million euros.

This situation had repercussions in the following season, both institutionally and athletically, in 2018-19, when there were two presidents, five coaches, and 37 different players in official matches. The club managed to stay in the division in the last few games of the league, finishing three points above relegation in 15th place.

=== Promotion to Segunda Federación ===
Club crest used from 2021 to 2025

After five seasons in Tercera División, and with new owners, the 2021-22 season would be played in the new Tercera Federación, a new league resulting from the restructuring of the national football categories in Spain.

After a good season, on April 23, 2022, the team defeated CD Tarancón 3-0 to become champions of Group XVIII of the Tercera Federación for the first time in its history, earning direct promotion to the Segunda Federación with Gonzalo Ónega at the helm of the team.

CD Guadalajara made its debut in the Segunda Federación on September 4, 2022, in a match they lost 2-0 to CD Coria. Their first victory came on the second day of the season when the Castilian team beat UD Montijo 3-1. That season, they also achieved two milestones in the Copa del Rey. For the first time in its history, Guadalajara advanced in the Copa del Rey against a team two divisions above them, SD Ponferradina, which played in the Segunda División, winning 2-1. This meant that, for the first time in its history, it faced a Primera División team, Elche CF, in an official match. Elche won the tie 3-0, ending Deportivo Guadalajara's best performance in the Copa del Rey to date.

=== Promotion to Primera Federación ===
In the 2024–25 season, the team was crowned champion for the second time in its history, this time in Group V of the Segunda Federación, achieving promotion to the Primera Federación. It became champion and secured promotion on matchday 31 after a 1-1 draw between CP Cacereño and CD Illescas. It finished as the top team with the best score of all the groups with 74 points, and Amador Zarco was the goalkeeper with the fewest goals conceded in the category with 15 goals against.

In 2025–26, the team reached the Copa Del Rey round of 32 for the first time ever in the club's history but they lost 2–0 against FC Barcelona.

== Season to season ==
Season	Tier	Division	Place	Copa del Rey
1947–48	4	1ª Reg.	2nd	
1948–49	4	1ª Reg.	1st	
1949–50	3	3ª	8th	
1950–51	3	3ª	2nd	
1951–52	3	3ª	12th	
1952–53	3	3ª	11th	
1953–54	3	3ª	14th	
1954–55	3	3ª	10th	
1955–56	3	3ª	6th	
1956–57	3	3ª	7th	
1957–58	3	3ª	9th	
1958–59	3	3ª	10th	
1959–60	3	3ª	13th	
1960–61	3	3ª	13th	
1961–62	3	3ª	14th	
1962–63	4	1ª Reg.	3rd	
1963–64	3	3ª	10th	
1964–65	3	3ª	8th	
1965–66	DNP			
1966–67	DNP			

Season	Tier	Division	Place	Copa del Rey
1967–68	3	3ª	15th	
1968–69	4	1ª Reg.	8th	
1969–70	4	1ª Reg.	7th	
1970–71	4	1ª Reg.	4th	
1971–72	4	1ª Reg.	6th	
1972–73	4	1ª Reg.	2nd	
1973–74	3	3ª	8th	First round
1974–75	3	3ª	19th	First round
1975–76	4	Reg. Pref.	2nd	
1976–77	3	3ª	18th	First round
1977–78	4	3ª	20th	Second round
1978–79	5	Reg. Pref.	10th	
1979–80	5	Reg. Pref.	4th	
1980–81	4	3ª	16th	
1981–82	4	3ª	20th	
1982–83	5	Reg. Pref.	3rd	
1983–84	4	3ª	12th	
1984–85	4	3ª	6th	
1985–86	4	3ª	12th	First round
1986–87	4	3ª	20th	

Season	Tier	Division	Place	Copa del Rey
1987–88	4	3ª	14th	
1988–89	4	3ª	4th	
1989–90	4	3ª	6th	
1990–91	4	3ª	2nd	Second round
1991–92	4	3ª	6th	
1992–93	4	3ª	14th	First round
1993–94	4	3ª	11th	
1994–95	4	3ª	11th	
1995–96	4	3ª	9th	
1996–97	4	3ª	6th	
1997–98	4	3ª	4th	
1998–99	4	3ª	2nd	
1999–2000	4	3ª	9th	
2000–01	4	3ª	5th	
2001–02	4	3ª	11th	
2002–03	4	3ª	3rd	
2003–04	4	3ª	5th	
2004–05	4	3ª	8th	
2005–06	4	3ª	2nd	
2006–07	4	3ª	2nd	

Season	Tier	Division	Place	Copa del Rey
2007–08	3	2ª B	8th	
2008–09	3	2ª B	9th	
2009–10	3	2ª B	3rd	
2010–11	3	2ª B	2nd	Second round
2011–12	2	2ª	16th	Second round
2012–13	2	2ª	18th	Second round
2013–14	3	2ª B	5th	First round
2014–15	3	2ª B	3rd	Second round
2015–16	3	2ª B	17th	
2016–17	4	3ª	4th	
2017–18	4	3ª	6th	
2018–19	4	3ª	15th	
2019–20	4	3ª	3rd	
2020–21	4	3ª	4th / 1st	
2021–22	5	3ª RFEF	1st	
2022–23	4	2ª Fed.	7th	Second round
2023–24	4	2ª Fed.	10th	
2024–25	4	2ª Fed.	1st	
2025–26	3	1ª Fed.	18th	Round of 32
2026–27	4	2ª Fed.		

- 2 seasons in Segunda División
- 1 season in Primera Federación
- 7 seasons in Segunda División B
- 4 seasons in Segunda Federación
- 51 seasons in Tercera División
- 1 season in Tercera División RFEF

== Honours ==
- Copa Federación Centro
  - Winners (1): 1949–50

== Current squad ==
As of 4 February 2026

Note: Flags indicate national team as defined under FIFA eligibility rules; some limited exceptions apply. Players may hold more than one non-FIFA nationality.

No.	Pos.	Nation	Player
1	GK	ESP	Amador Zarco
2	DF	ESP	Lucas Pérez (on loan from Alcorcón)
3	DF	ESP	Agus Moreno
4	DF	ESP	Javier Ablanque
5	DF	ESP	Dani Gallardo
6	MF	ESP	Pablo Rojo
7	MF	ESP	Neskes
8	MF	ESP	Toño Calvo
9	FW	ESP	Alejandro Cañizo
10	FW	ESP	David Amigo
11	FW	ESP	Unax Álvarez
13	GK	ESP	Dani Vicente

No.	Pos.	Nation	Player
14	MF	ESP	Raúl Tavares
15	DF	ESP	Víctor Rodríguez (on loan from Leganés B)
16	DF	ESP	Kike Cadete
17	FW	ESP	Javi Gómez
18	DF	ESP	Julio Martínez
19	FW	ESP	Pablo Muñoz
20	MF	ESP	Miki Muñoz
21	MF	ESP	Guille Perero
22	MF	ESP	Samu Mayo
23	DF	ESP	Jorge Casado
24	FW	GBS	Salifo Caropitche (on loan from Tenerife)

== See also ==
- CD Guadalajara B, reserve team
