= Rayo Ciudad Alcobendas CF =

Spanish football club

RC Alcobendas
- Full name: Rayo Ciudad Alcobendas Club de Fútbol
- Founded: 2011
- Ground: Valdelasfuentes, Alcobendas, Madrid, Spain
- Capacity: 500
- President: Miguel Ángel Pla
- Manager: Daniel Stechina
- League: Tercera Federación – Group 7
- 2025–26: Primera Autonómica de Aficionados – Group 1, 1st of 18 (champions)
- Website: www.rcalcobendas.com
Home colours	Away colours

Rayo Ciudad Alcobendas Club de Fútbol is a Spanish football club based in Alcobendas, in the Community of Madrid. Founded in 2011, they play in the Tercera Federación – Group 7, holding home matches at the Ciudad Polideportiva de Valdelasfuentes.

== History ==
Founded in 2011 by a group of parents, coaches and friends, Rayo Ciudad Alcobendas had a change of board in 2021, aiming to establish a strong youth setup in the Madrid region. In 2016, the first team achieved a first-ever promotion to Preferente de Madrid, but suffered immediate relegation.

In May 2024, Rayo Alcobendas returned to the Preferente, and achieved a first-ever promotion to Tercera Federación roughly two years later.

== Season-to-season ==
Season	Tier	Division	Place	Copa del Rey
2012–13	8	3ª Afic.	2nd	
2013–14	7	2ª Afic.	4th	
2014–15	7	2ª Afic.	1st	
2015–16	6	1ª Afic.	1st	
2016–17	5	Pref.	17th	
2017–18	6	1ª Afic.	7th	
2018–19	6	1ª Afic.	2nd	
2019–20	5	Pref.	13th	
2020–21	5	Pref.	15th	
2021–22	7	1ª Afic.	1st	
2022–23	6	Pref.	15th	
2023–24	7	1ª Afic.	1st	
2024–25	6	1ª Aut.	8th	
2025–26	6	1ª Aut.	1st	
2026–27	5	3ª Fed.		

- 1 season in Tercera Federación

== Official website ==
- Official website (in Spanish)
