= AD El Pardo =

Spanish football club

El Pardo
- Full name: Agrupación Deportiva El Pardo
- Founded: 1963
- Ground: Mingorrubio, Madrid; Community of Madrid, Spain
- Capacity: 3,000
- President: (Spain) César Ávila Suárez
- League: Primera de Aficionados – Group 2
- 2024–25: Segunda de Aficionados – Group 14, 1st of 15 (champions)
Home colours	Away colours

Agrupación Deportiva El Pardo is a Spanish football club from Madrid in the Community of Madrid, in Spain. Founded in 1963, they play in Primera de Aficionados – Group 2, holding home matches at the Estadio Mingorrubio.

== History ==
The AD El Pardo is a club of the city of Madrid, founded in 1963. In the 1990/1991 season he played in Tercera División (Level 3). Currently, in the (2011–12 season) playing in the Tercera de Aficionados (Level 8). Its decline time began in the 2006/07 season when ended the league with 3 points in Preferente (Level 5), in 2007/08 ended with 23 points in Primera Aficionados (Level 6) and came back down and now again has to be in decline and -3 point penalty. Since 2019 Cesar Ávila is the new president of AD El Pardo.

== Season to season ==
Season	Tier	Division	Place	Copa del Rey
1969–70	7	3ª Reg.	1st	
1970–71	6	3ª Reg. P.	7th	
1971–72	6	3ª Reg. P.	15th	
1972–73	6	3ª Reg. P.	8th	
1973–74	7	3ª Reg. P.	5th	
1974–75	7	3ª Reg. P.	14th	
1975–76	7	3ª Reg. P.	3rd	
1976–77	7	3ª Reg. P.	2nd	
1977–78	7	2ª Reg.	1st	
1978–79	6	1ª Reg.	12th	
1979–80	6	1ª Reg.	17th	
1980–81	7	2ª Reg.	7th	
1981–82	7	2ª Reg.	3rd	
1982–83	6	1ª Reg.	16th	
1983–84	7	2ª Reg.	3rd	
1984–85	7	2ª Reg.	3rd	
1985–86	6	1ª Reg.	4th	
1986–87	5	Reg. Pref.	18th	
1987–88	6	1ª Reg.	2nd	
1988–89	5	Reg. Pref.	8th	

Season	Tier	Division	Place	Copa del Rey
1989–90	5	Reg. Pref.	1st	
1990–91	4	3ª	20th	
1991–92	5	Reg. Pref.	11th	
1992–93	5	Reg. Pref.	14th	
1993–94	5	Reg. Pref.	9th	
1994–95	5	Reg. Pref.	5th	
1995–96	5	Reg. Pref.	13th	
1996–97	5	Reg. Pref.	10th	
1997–98	5	Reg. Pref.	13th	
1998–99	5	Reg. Pref.	14th	
1999–2000	5	Reg. Pref.	15th	
2000–01	6	1ª Reg.	3rd	
2001–02	6	1ª Reg.	8th	
2002–03	6	1ª Reg.	2nd	
2003–04	5	Reg. Pref.	3rd	
2004–05	5	Reg. Pref.	3rd	
2005–06	5	Reg. Pref.	13th	
2006–07	5	Reg. Pref.	18th	
2007–08	6	1ª Reg.	17th	
2008–09	7	2ª Reg.	18th	

Season	Tier	Division	Place	Copa del Rey
2009–10	8	3ª Afic.	15th	
2010–11	8	3ª Afic.	9th	
2011–12	8	3ª Afic.	3rd	
2012–13	8	3ª Afic.	2nd	
2013–14	7	2ª Afic.	10th	
2014–15	7	2ª Afic.	11th	
2015–16	7	2ª Afic.	8th	
2016–17	7	2ª Afic.	10th	
2017–18	7	2ª Afic.	9th	
2018–19	7	2ª Afic.	6th	
2019–20	7	2ª Afic.	7th	
2020–21	7	2ª Afic.	13th	
2021–22	8	2ª Afic.	7th	
2022–23	8	2ª Afic.	9th	
2023–24	8	2ª Afic.	18th	
2024–25	9	2ª Afic.	1st	
2025–26	8	1ª Afic.		

- 1 season in Tercera División
