= Móstoles CF =

Association football club in Spain

Móstoles
- Full name: Móstoles Club de Fútbol
- Founded: 2006; 20 years ago (as UD Móstoles)
- Ground: El Soto, Móstoles, Madrid, Spain
- Capacity: 14,000
- President: Antonio Gómez
- Manager: Jesús Lucas
- League: Preferente de Aficionados – Group 4
- 2025–26: Preferente de Aficionados – Group 4, 10th of 18
- Website: www.mostolescf.com
Home colours	Away colours

Móstoles Club de Fútbol, previously Unión Deportivo Móstoles, is a Spanish football team based in Móstoles, in the autonomous community of Madrid. Founded in 2006, it plays in Preferente de Aficionados – Group 4, holding home games at Estadio El Soto, which has a 14,000-seat capacity.

== History ==
Founded in 2006 under the name of Unión Deportivo Móstoles, the club was renamed Móstoles Club de Fútbol in 2013 after a club in the city, CD Móstoles, was dissolved. The club first reached the Preferente (fifth tier) in 2019, achieving their second promotion after the name change.

In the 2019–20 season, Móstoles won their Preferente group, achieving promotion to Tercera División and winning a place in the 2020–21 Copa del Rey.

== Season to season ==
=== UD Móstoles ===
Season	Tier	Division	Place	Copa del Rey
2006–07	8	3ª Reg.	15th	
2007–08	8	3ª Reg.	15th	
2008–09	8	3ª Reg.	6th	
2009–10	8	3ª Afic.	10th	
2010–11	8	3ª Afic.	4th	
2011–12	8	3ª Afic.	1st	
2012–13	7	2ª Afic.	15th	

=== Móstoles CF ===
Season	Tier	Division	Place	Copa del Rey
2013–14	7	2ª Afic.	1st	
2014–15	6	1ª Afic.	7th	
2015–16	6	1ª Afic.	6th	
2016–17	6	1ª Afic.	10th	
2017–18	6	1ª Afic.	1st	
2018–19	5	Pref.	4th	
2019–20	5	Pref.	1st	
2020–21	4	3ª	11th / 8th	Preliminary
2021–22	6	Pref.	3rd	
2022–23	6	Pref.	10th	
2023–24	6	Pref.	9th	
2024–25	6	1ª Aut.	17th	
2025–26	7	Pref. Afic.		

- 1 season in Tercera División
