= CD Griñón =

Spanish football club

Griñón
- Full name: Club Deportivo Griñón
- Founded: 1968
- Ground: La Mina, Griñón, Community of Madrid, Spain
- Capacity: 1,000
- Chairman: David Villacieros
- League: Primera Autonómica de Aficionados – Group 2
- 2024–25: Preferente de Aficionados – Group 4, 2nd of 18 (promoted)
- Website: http://cdgrinon.com/
Home colours	Away colours

Club Deportivo Griñón is a football club based in Griñón, Spain. Founded in 1968, it plays in the Primera Autonómica de Aficionados – Group 2. Its stadium is La Mina with a capacity of 1,000 seats.

== Season to season ==
Season	Tier	Division	Place	Copa del Rey
1975–76	8	3ª Reg.	9th	
1976–77	8	3ª Reg.	7th	
1977–78	9	3ª Reg.	5th	
1978–79	9	3ª Reg.	13th	
1979–80	9	3ª Reg.	5th	
1980–81	9	3ª Reg.	3rd	
1981–82	9	3ª Reg.	1st	
1982–83	8	3ª Reg. P.	1st	
1983–84	7	2ª Reg.	3rd	
1984–85	7	2ª Reg.	7th	
1985–86	7	2ª Reg.	1st	
1986–87	6	1ª Reg.	13th	
1987–88	6	1ª Reg.	16th	
1988–89	5	Reg. Pref.	17th	
1989–90	6	1ª Reg.	5th	
1990–91	6	1ª Reg.	8th	
1991–92	6	1ª Reg.	1st	
1992–93	5	Reg. Pref.	9th	
1993–94	5	Reg. Pref.	5th	
1994–95	5	Reg. Pref.	8th	

Season	Tier	Division	Place	Copa del Rey
1995–96	5	Reg. Pref.	9th	
1996–97	5	Reg. Pref.	8th	
1997–98	5	Reg. Pref.	12th	
1998–99	5	Reg. Pref.	18th	
1999–2000	6	1ª Reg.	17th	
2000–01	7	2ª Reg.	3rd	
2001–02	7	2ª Reg.	5th	
2002–03	7	2ª Reg.	5th	
2003–04	7	2ª Reg.	1st	
2004–05	6	1ª Reg.	9th	
2005–06	6	1ª Reg.	9th	
2006–07	6	1ª Reg.	1st	
2007–08	5	Reg. Pref.	4th	
2008–09	5	Reg. Pref.	10th	
2009–10	5	Pref.	11th	
2010–11	5	Pref.	4th	
2011–12	5	Pref.	2nd	
2012–13	4	3ª	19th	
2013–14	5	Pref.	8th	
2014–15	5	Pref.	9th	

Season	Tier	Division	Place	Copa del Rey
2015–16	5	Pref.	16th	
2016–17	6	1ª Afic.	4th	
2017–18	6	1ª Afic.	5th	
2018–19	6	1ª Afic.	7th	
2019–20	6	1ª Afic.	9th	
2020–21	6	1ª Afic.	5th	
2021–22	7	1ª Afic.	8th	
2022–23	7	1ª Afic.	9th	
2023–24	7	1ª Afic.	6th	
2024–25	7	Pref. Afic.	2nd	
2025–26	6	1ª Aut.		
