= CP Parla Escuela =

Association football club in Spain

Parla Escuela
- Full name: Club Polideportivo Parla Escuela-Fair Play
- Founded: 1989; 37 years ago
- Ground: Las Américas, Parla, Madrid, Spain
- Capacity: 2,000
- Chairman: Ismael Martínez Rodríguez
- Manager: Jose Luis Vadillo (Jaro)
- League: Tercera Federación – Group 7
- 2025–26: Primera Autonómica de Aficionados – Group 2, 1st of 18 (champions)
- Website: www.parlaescuela.es
Home colours	Away colours

Club Polideportivo Parla Escuela-Fair Play is a Spanish football team based in Parla, in the autonomous community of Madrid. Founded in 1989, it plays in Tercera Federación – Group 7, holding home games at Estadio Las Américas, with a capacity of 2,000 seats.

In 2021, the club merged with CD Fair Play Parla and was renamed CP Parla Escuela-Fair Play.

== Season to season ==
Season	Tier	Division	Place	Copa del Rey
1993–94	6	1ª Reg.	1st	
1994–95	5	Reg. Pref.	16th	
1995–96	6	1ª Reg.	16th	
1996–97	7	2ª Reg.	3rd	
1997–98	7	2ª Reg.	(R)	
1998–99	8	3ª Reg.	1st	
1999–2000	7	2ª Reg.	3rd	
2000–01	6	1ª Reg.	3rd	
2001–02	5	Reg. Pref.	15th	
2002–03	6	1ª Reg.	1st	
2003–04	5	Reg. Pref.	7th	
2004–05	5	Reg. Pref.	17th	
2005–06	6	1ª Reg.	5th	
2006–07	6	1ª Reg.	1st	
2007–08	5	Reg. Pref.	15th	
2008–09	6	1ª Reg.	2nd	
2009–10	5	Pref.	17th	
2010–11	6	1ª Cat.	5th	
2011–12	6	1ª Cat.	9th	
2012–13	6	1ª Cat.	7th	

Season	Tier	Division	Place	Copa del Rey
2013–14	6	1ª Cat.	1st	
2014–15	5	Pref.	5th	
2015–16	5	Pref.	13th	
2016–17	5	Pref.	1st	
2017–18	4	3ª	20th	
2018–19	5	Pref.	16th	
2019–20	6	1ª Cat.	3rd	
2020–21	6	1ª Cat.	1st	
2021–22	6	Pref.	5th	
2022–23	6	Pref.	3rd	
2023–24	6	Pref.	6th	
2024–25	6	1ª Aut.	10th	First round
2025–26	6	1ª Aut.	1st	
2026–27	5	3ª Fed.		

- 2 seasons in Tercera División
