= CD Fortuna =

Spanish football team

Fortuna
- Full name: Club Deportivo Fortuna
- Founded: 1970
- Ground: La Fortuna, Leganés, Madrid, Spain
- Capacity: 3,000
- Chairman: (Spain) José Antonio Blanco Ruiz
- Manager: (Spain) Raúl J. Trueba Frutos
- League: Primera Autonómica de Aficionados – Group 2
- 2024–25: Primera Autonómica de Aficionados – Group 2, 14th of 18
Home colours	Away colours

Club Deportivo Fortuna are a Spanish football team from Leganés, in the Madrid outskirts. Founded on 1970, they currently play in Primera Autonómica de Aficionados – Group 2. They play shirts with green stripes, and red. Their home stadium is the Estadio de La Fortuna, which seats 3,000 spectators.

== Season to season ==
Season	Tier	Division	Place	Copa del Rey
1970–71	7	3ª Reg.	13th	
1971–72	7	3ª Reg.	11th	
1972–73	7	3ª Reg.	2nd	
1973–74	7	3ª Reg. P.	16th	
1974–75	7	3ª Reg. P.	20th	
1975–76	8	3ª Reg.	8th	
1976–77	8	3ª Reg.	5th	
1977–78	9	3ª Reg.	1st	
1978–79	8	3ª Reg. P.	14th	
1979–80	8	3ª Reg. P.	3rd	
1980–81	7	2ª Reg.	13th	
1981–82	7	2ª Reg.	7th	
1982–83	6	1ª Reg.	12th	
1983–84	6	1ª Reg.	4th	
1984–85	6	1ª Reg.	10th	
1985–86	6	1ª Reg.	1st	
1986–87	5	Reg. Pref.	12th	
1987–88	5	Reg. Pref.	16th	
1988–89	6	1ª Reg.	2nd	
1989–90	5	Reg. Pref.	6th	

Season	Tier	Division	Place	Copa del Rey
1990–91	5	Reg. Pref.	18th	
1991–92	6	1ª Reg.	7th	
1992–93	6	1ª Reg.	4th	
1993–94	6	1ª Reg.	2nd	
1994–95	5	Reg. Pref.	5th	
1995–96	5	Reg. Pref.	1st	
1996–97	4	3ª	19th	
1997–98	5	Reg. Pref.	3rd	
1998–99	5	Reg. Pref.	3rd	
1999–2000	5	Reg. Pref.	2nd	
2000–01	5	Reg. Pref.	3rd	
2001–02	5	Reg. Pref.	1st	
2002–03	4	3ª	17th	
2003–04	5	Reg. Pref.	10th	
2004–05	5	Reg. Pref.	6th	
2005–06	5	Reg. Pref.	9th	
2006–07	5	Reg. Pref.	3rd	
2007–08	5	Reg. Pref.	8th	
2008–09	5	Reg. Pref.	14th	
2009–10	5	Pref.	5th	

Season	Tier	Division	Place	Copa del Rey
2010–11	5	Pref.	3rd	
2011–12	4	3ª	20th	
2012–13	5	Pref.	12th	
2013–14	5	Pref.	9th	
2014–15	5	Pref.	13th	
2015–16	5	Pref.	14th	
2016–17	5	Pref.	11th	
2017–18	5	Pref.	16th	
2018–19	6	1ª Afic.	18th	
2019–20	5	Pref.	6th	
2020–21	5	Pref.	14th	
2021–22	7	1ª Afic.	1st	
2022–23	6	Pref.	14th	
2023–24	6	Pref.	12th	
2024–25	6	1ª Aut.	14th	
2025–26	6	1ª Aut.		

- 3 seasons in Tercera División
