= Aravaca CF =

Aravaca
- Full name: Aravaca Club de Fútbol
- Founded: 1933
- Ground: Antonio Sanfíz; Madrid, Com. Madrid (Spain)
- Capacity: 2,000
- Chairman: Emiliano de la Cal
- Manager: Pablo Saldaña
- League: Primera Autonómica de Aficionados – Group 1
- 2024–25: Tercera Federación – Group 7, 16th of 18 (relegated)
- Website: http://www.aravacacf.es/pnfg/NPortada
| Home colours | Away colours |

Aravaca Club de Fútbol is a Spanish football club from Madrid, in the Community of Madrid. Founded in 1933, it is one of the oldest clubs in Madrid, and they play in Primera Autonómica de Aficionados – Group 1, holding home matches at the Estadio Antonio Sanfíz, which has a capacity of 2,000 spectators.

In 2017, Aravaca tied one game in the Copa Federación, against Fuenlabrada, who lost the final against Atlético Saguntino.

== Season to season ==
| Season | Tier | Division | Place | Copa del Rey |
|---|---|---|---|---|
| 1945–46 | 6 | 3ª Reg. | 5th | |
| 1946–47 | 7 | 4ª Reg. | 10th | |
| 1947–48 | 7 | 4ª Reg. | 9th | |
| 1948–49 | 7 | 4ª Reg. | 7th | |
| 1949–50 | 7 | 4ª Reg. | 4th | |
| 1950–51 | 7 | 4ª Reg. | 7th | |
| 1951–52 | 7 | 4ª Reg. | 7th | |
| 1952–53 | 7 | 4ª Reg. | 3rd | |
| 1953–54 | 7 | 4ª Reg. | 7th | |
| 1954–55 | 7 | 4ª Reg. | 7th | |
| 1955–56 | 7 | 4ª Reg. | 1st | |
| 1956–57 | 7 | 4ª Reg. | 6th | |
| 1957–58 | 7 | 4ª Reg. | 5th | |
| 1958–59 | 7 | 4ª Reg. | 6th | |
| 1959–60 | 7 | 4ª Reg. | 10th | |
| 1960–61 | 7 | 4ª Reg. | 8th | |
| 1961–62 | 7 | 4ª Reg. | 6th | |
| 1962–63 | 7 | 4ª Reg. | 2nd | |
| 1963–64 | 6 | 3ª Reg. | 14th | |
| 1964–65 | 6 | 3ª Reg. | 14th | |

| Season | Tier | Division | Place | Copa del Rey |
|---|---|---|---|---|
| 1965–66 | 6 | 3ª Reg. | 1st | |
| 1966–67 | 5 | 2ª Reg. | 5th | |
| 1967–68 | 5 | 2ª Reg. | 8th | |
| 1968–69 | 5 | 2ª Reg. | 1st | |
| 1969–70 | 4 | 1ª Reg. | 12th | |
| 1970–71 | 4 | 1ª Reg. | 20th | |
| 1971–72 | 5 | 2ª Reg. | 4th | |
| 1972–73 | 5 | 2ª Reg. | 5th | |
| 1973–74 | 5 | 1ª Reg. | 20th | |
| 1974–75 | 6 | 2ª Reg. | 5th | |
| 1975–76 | 6 | 2ª Reg. | 4th | |
| 1976–77 | 6 | 2ª Reg. | 6th | |
| 1977–78 | 6 | 1ª Reg. | 9th | |
| 1978–79 | 6 | 1ª Reg. | 16th | |
| 1979–80 | 7 | 2ª Reg. | 1st | |
| 1980–81 | 6 | 1ª Reg. | 15th | |
| 1981–82 | 7 | 2ª Reg. | 2nd | |
| 1982–83 | 6 | 1ª Reg. | 1st | |
| 1983–84 | 5 | Reg. Pref. | 9th | |
| 1984–85 | 5 | Reg. Pref. | 15th | |

| Season | Tier | Division | Place | Copa del Rey |
|---|---|---|---|---|
| 1985–86 | 6 | 1ª Reg. | 3rd | |
| 1986–87 | 5 | Reg. Pref. | 19th | |
| 1987–88 | 6 | 1ª Reg. | 4th | |
| 1988–89 | 6 | 1ª Reg. | 3rd | |
| 1989–90 | 5 | Reg. Pref. | 6th | |
| 1990–91 | 5 | Reg. Pref. | 10th | |
| 1991–92 | 5 | Reg. Pref. | 13th | |
| 1992–93 | 5 | Reg. Pref. | 18th | |
| 1993–94 | 6 | 1ª Reg. | 8th | |
| 1994–95 | 6 | 1ª Reg. | 14th | |
| 1995–96 | 6 | 1ª Reg. | 1st | |
| 1996–97 | 5 | Reg. Pref. | 12th | |
| 1997–98 | 5 | Reg. Pref. | 1st | |
| 1998–99 | 4 | 3ª | 21st | |
| 1999–2000 | 5 | Reg. Pref. | 5th | |
| 2000–01 | 5 | Reg. Pref. | 6th | |
| 2001–02 | 5 | Reg. Pref. | 1st | |
| 2002–03 | 4 | 3ª | 18th | |
| 2003–04 | 5 | Reg. Pref. | 8th | |
| 2004–05 | 5 | Reg. Pref. | 11th | |

| Season | Tier | Division | Place | Copa del Rey |
|---|---|---|---|---|
| 2005–06 | 5 | Reg. Pref. | 5th | |
| 2006–07 | 5 | Reg. Pref. | 11th | |
| 2007–08 | 5 | Reg. Pref. | 6th | |
| 2008–09 | 5 | Reg. Pref. | 7th | |
| 2009–10 | 5 | Pref. | 9th | |
| 2010–11 | 5 | Pref. | 7th | |
| 2011–12 | 5 | Pref. | 6th | |
| 2012–13 | 5 | Pref. | 1st | |
| 2013–14 | 4 | 3ª | 18th | |
| 2014–15 | 5 | Pref. | 1st | |
| 2015–16 | 4 | 3ª | 13th | |
| 2016–17 | 4 | 3ª | 18th | |
| 2017–18 | 5 | Pref. | 7th | |
| 2018–19 | 5 | Pref. | 7th | |
| 2019–20 | 5 | Pref. | 1th | |
| 2020–21 | 5 | Pref. | 7th | |
| 2021–22 | 6 | Pref. | 10th | |
| 2022–23 | 6 | Pref. | 6th | |
| 2023–24 | 6 | Pref. | 2nd | |
| 2024–25 | 5 | 3ª Fed. | 16th | |

| Season | Tier | Division | Place | Copa del Rey |
|---|---|---|---|---|
| 2025–26 | 6 | 1ª Aut. | | |

- 5 seasons in Tercera División
- 1 season in Tercera Federación
