= ED Moratalaz =

Association football club in Spain

- Full name: Escuela Deportiva Moratalaz
- Founded: 2006
- Ground: Dehesa de Moratalaz, Madrid, Community of Madrid, Spain
- Capacity: 2,500
- President: Jesus Recio
- Head coach: Hugo Díaz
- League: Primera Autonómica de Aficionados – Group 2
- 2024–25: Primera Autonómica de Aficionados – Group 1, 13th of 18
- Website: https://edmoratalaz.com/
| Home colours | Away colours |

Escuela Deportiva Moratalaz is a Spanish football team based in Madrid, in the neighbourhood of Moratalaz. Founded in 2006, plays in Primera Autonómica de Aficionados – Group 2. The team's stadium is the Dehesa de Moratalaz with capacity of 2,500 seats.

== History ==
Escuela Deportiva Moratalaz is created in the year 2006 by the merger of two teams: Club Deportivo Moratalaz and Escuela Deportiva Unión de Moratalaz.

== Season to season ==
| Season | Tier | Division | Place | Copa del Rey |
|---|---|---|---|---|
| 2006–07 | 6 | 1ª Reg. | 4th | |
| 2007–08 | 6 | 1ª Reg. | 2nd | |
| 2008–09 | 5 | Reg. Pref. | 12th | |
| 2009–10 | 5 | Pref. | 15th | |
| 2010–11 | 6 | 1ª Afic. | 4th | |
| 2011–12 | 6 | 1ª Afic. | 2nd | |
| 2012–13 | 5 | Pref. | 13th | |
| 2013–14 | 5 | Pref. | 9th | |
| 2014–15 | 5 | Pref. | 11th | |
| 2015–16 | 5 | Pref. | 9th | |
| 2016–17 | 5 | Pref. | 6th | |
| 2017–18 | 5 | Pref. | 8th | |
| 2018–19 | 5 | Pref. | 1st | |
| 2019–20 | 4 | 3ª | 16th | |
| 2020–21 | 4 | 3ª | 2th / 4rd | |
| 2021–22 | 5 | 3ª RFEF | 17th | |
| 2022–23 | 6 | Pref. | 5th | |
| 2023–24 | 6 | Pref. | 4th | |
| 2024–25 | 6 | 1ª Aut. | 13th | |
| 2025–26 | 6 | 1ª Aut. | | |

- 2 seasons in Tercera División
- 1 season in Tercera División RFEF
