= RCD Carabanchel =

Association football club in Spain

Real Carabanchel
- Full name: Real Club Deportivo Carabanchel
- Nicknames: Carabancheleros, blanquinegros
- Founded: 1916
- Ground: Campo de La Mina, Madrid, Spain
- Capacity: 2,000
- Chairman: Javier Muñoz Rivera
- Manager: Samuel Fernández Aviles
- League: Tercera Federación – Group 7
- 2024–25: Tercera Federación – Group 7, 13th of 18
- Website: http://www.rcdcarabanchel.es
Home colours	Away colours	Third colours

Real Club Deportivo Carabanchel is a Spanish football club in the Carabanchel district in the city of Madrid, Spain that plays in the Tercera Federación – Group 7. It is the third oldest team in the capital, after Real Madrid and Atlético Madrid, and the thirteenth oldest in Spain.

The highest level the club has reached is the Segunda División B.

== History ==
Real Club Deportivo Carabanchel was officially founded on 8 September 1906. It started playing sports teams friendlies against others in the capital city in the Alto and Bajo quarters of the district.

In 1916, Pedro Arranz became president, who gives the team a charter officers. Carabanchel also signed the same year Castellana in the Federation Cup, which began as a regional tournament. In 1927 amounts to the First Regional club, and proclaimed champion Castilla at amateur level in 1936, before the start of the Civil War.

In 1955, Carabanchel was promoted, for the first time in its history, to the Third Division to become a champion of the regional division. In season 1966–67, the Madrid team was crowned champions of their group in the Tercera earning the right to play CD Badajoz in the first play-off round, which it lost 12–1 on aggregate.

During the 1970s and 1980s the team went through various sporting crises, which were not resolved until 1988 when it returned to the third division. Carabanchel then improved, and finished in third place in the Madrid group in 1990. After several varying seasons, in 1994–95 Carabanchel qualified for the second phase of promotion to B, eventually losing to Cultural Leonesa.

Finally, in the 1995–96 season, Carabanchel were promoted to Segunda División B to finish third in regular season champion and its group for promotion. The club spent two years in the category of bronze in its first season, the team from Madrid to enter into a good season when finishing eighth, but in 1998 consume their descent to the finish next to last group.

Since then, Carabanchel fell into a deep economic crisis to the point even the team's continuity was endangered: in 2006, the Blanquinegros fell down to Third, and without a professional team any more, the team went down to Regional First in 2008.

In the 2009–10 season, the club renewed the project with a total change of the board after a motion of censure and creating a team to climb to third division two years. After achieving promotion to the Preferente, in the 2010–11 season the club promoted to Tercera División, along with CDC Moscardó.

Among its historic rivals are Moscardó in Usera, CD Puerta Bonita in Carabanchel, and Getafe CF.

== Logo ==
The logo represents the Cross of Saint James, pattern Carabanchel, and the Royal Crown, granted by HM Juan Carlos I of Spain in 1997 in recognition of the club's history as one of the pioneers of football in Madrid. This coat is used since then as the officer.

== Kit ==
Real Carabanchel's kit in season 2010–2011 is a white shirt and black shorts and socks, with the sponsorship of Limpiezas Garro, Joma and Junkers. Features of the shirt are the old coat and Cross of Saint James behind the current shield. At the same time they added the player's name.

The away kit is a shirt, shorts and blue socks. It also has a third kit of shirt, shorts and red socks.

== Stadium ==
R.C.D. Carabanchel plays its games in the stadium known as Campo de La Mina, with a capacity for 2,000 spectators. This stadium is one of the oldest in the city. It was opened in 1916, when RCD Carabanchel obtained the official status.

== Season to season ==
Season	Tier	Division	Place	Copa del Rey
1934–35	4	1ª Reg.	3rd	
1935–36	4	1ª Reg.	4th	
1939–40	4	1ª Reg.	4th	
1940–41	4	1ª Reg.	4th	
1941–42	3	1ª Reg.	4th	
1942–43	3	1ª Reg.	6th	
1943–44	4	1ª Reg.	8th	
1944–45	5	2ª Reg.	6th	
1945–46	5	2ª Reg.	10th	
1946–47	6	2ª Reg.	1st	
1947–48	5	2ª Reg. P.	1st	
1948–49	4	1ª Reg.	9th	
1949–50	4	1ª Reg.	4th	
1950–51	4	1ª Reg.	5th	
1951–52	4	1ª Reg.	5th	
1952–53	4	1ª Reg.	5th	
1953–54	4	1ª Reg.	7th	
1954–55	4	1ª Reg.	1st	
1955–56	3	3ª	5th	
1956–57	3	3ª	8th	

Season	Tier	Division	Place	Copa del Rey
1957–58	3	3ª	10th	
1958–59	3	3ª	14th	
1959–60	3	3ª	15th	
1960–61	4	1ª Reg.	1st	
1961–62	3	3ª	6th	
1962–63	3	3ª	14th	
1963–64	3	3ª	5th	
1964–65	3	3ª	9th	
1965–66	3	3ª	13th	
1966–67	3	3ª	1st	
1967–68	3	3ª	8th	
1968–69	3	3ª	14th	
1969–70	3	3ª	8th	
1970–71	3	3ª	19th	First round
1971–72	4	1ª Reg.	8th	
1972–73	4	1ª Reg.	1st	
1973–74	3	3ª	13th	Second round
1974–75	3	3ª	7th	Third round
1975–76	3	3ª	12th	Third round
1976–77	3	3ª	16th	First round

Season	Tier	Division	Place	Copa del Rey
1977–78	4	3ª	7th	Third round
1978–79	4	3ª	9th	Second round
1979–80	4	3ª	17th	Second round
1980–81	4	3ª	10th	
1981–82	4	3ª	10th	
1982–83	4	3ª	9th	
1983–84	4	3ª	18th	
1984–85	5	Reg. Pref.	5th	
1985–86	5	Reg. Pref.	5th	
1986–87	5	Reg. Pref.	3rd	
1987–88	4	3ª	9th	
1988–89	4	3ª	6th	
1989–90	4	3ª	3rd	
1990–91	4	3ª	14th	Third round
1991–92	4	3ª	12th	
1992–93	4	3ª	12th	
1993–94	4	3ª	17th	
1994–95	4	3ª	3rd	
1995–96	4	3ª	3rd	
1996–97	3	2ª B	8th	First round

Season	Tier	Division	Place	Copa del Rey
1997–98	3	2ª B	19th	
1998–99	4	3ª	12th	
1999–2000	4	3ª	19th	
2000–01	5	Pref.	8th	
2001–02	5	Pref.	3rd	
2002–03	5	Pref.	3rd	
2003–04	4	3ª	19th	
2004–05	5	Pref.	1st	
2005–06	4	3ª	17th	
2006–07	5	Pref.	10th	
2007–08	5	Pref.	14th	
2008–09	6	1ª Cat.	4th	
2009–10	6	1ª Cat.	2nd	
2010–11	5	Pref.	2nd	
2011–12	4	3ª	7th	
2012–13	4	3ª	6th	
2013–14	4	3ª	20th	
2014–15	5	Pref.	7th	
2015–16	5	Pref.	6th	
2016–17	5	Pref.	6th	

Season	Tier	Division	Place	Copa del Rey
2017–18	5	Pref.	1st	
2018–19	4	3ª	14th	
2019–20	4	3ª	12th	
2020–21	4	3ª	6th / 5th	
2021–22	5	3ª RFEF	20th	
2022–23	6	Pref.	7th	
2023–24	6	Pref.	1st	
2024–25	5	3ª Fed.	13th	
2025–26	5	3ª Fed.	15th	
2026–27	6	1ª Aut.		

- 2 seasons in Segunda División B
- 45 seasons in Tercera División
- 3 seasons in Tercera Federación/Tercera División RFEF
