= CD Vicálvaro =

Spanish football team

Vicálvaro
- Full name: Club Deportivo Vicálvaro
- Founded: 1928
- Ground: Estadio Municipal; Madrid, Spain
- Capacity: 2,250
- Chairman: (Spain) Manuel Tirado
- Manager: (Spain) José María Rodríguez "May"
- League: Primera Autonómica de Aficionados – Group 2
- 2024–25: Primera Autonómica de Aficionados – Group 2, 6th of 18
- Website: http://www.cdvicalvaro.es/
Home colours	Away colours

Club Deportivo Vicálvaro is a Spanish football team based in the Madrid district of Vicálvaro. Founded in 1928, it currently plays in Primera Autonómica de Aficionados – Group 2, holding home matches at Estadio Municipal de Vicálvaro, which seats 2,250.

== History ==
From 1987 to 1997, Vicálvaro played nine years in national championships (Tercera División). In the 1991–92 season, it faced UE Figueres in the Spanish Cup. The Catalans were led by Jorge D'Alessandro, with future Olympic champion Toni Jiménez in goal (later of RCD Espanyol fame).

Subsequently, the club returned to the amateur leagues, even dropping down another level at the end of 2002–03 (promoting again immediately).

== Season to season ==
Season	Tier	Division	Place	Copa del Rey
1949–50	6	2ª Reg.	3rd	
1950–51	6	2ª Reg.	8th	
1951–52	DNP			
1952–53	DNP			
1953–54	DNP			
1954–55	8	5ª Reg.	12th	
1955–56	8	5ª Reg.	12th	
1956–1976	DNP			
1976–77	8	3ª Reg.	(R)	
1977–78	9	3ª Reg.	2nd	
1978–79	8	3ª Reg. P.	12th	
1979–80	8	3ª Reg. P.	1st	
1980–81	7	2ª Reg.	1st	
1981–82	6	1ª Reg.	7th	
1982–83	6	1ª Reg.	2nd	
1983–84	5	Reg. Pref.	3rd	
1984–85	5	Reg. Pref.	8th	
1985–86	5	Reg. Pref.	4th	
1986–87	5	Reg. Pref.	4th	
1987–88	4	3ª	13th	

Season	Tier	Division	Place	Copa del Rey
1988–89	4	3ª	12th	
1989–90	4	3ª	15th	
1990–91	4	3ª	8th	
1991–92	4	3ª	15th	Third round
1992–93	4	3ª	14th	
1993–94	4	3ª	18th	
1994–95	4	3ª	19th	
1995–96	5	Reg. Pref.	1st	
1996–97	4	3ª	22nd	
1997–98	5	Reg. Pref.	7th	
1998–99	5	Reg. Pref.	4th	
1999–2000	5	Reg. Pref.	6th	
2000–01	5	Reg. Pref.	5th	
2001–02	5	Reg. Pref.	8th	
2002–03	5	Reg. Pref.	16th	
2003–04	6	1ª Reg.	1st	
2004–05	5	Reg. Pref.	12th	
2005–06	5	Reg. Pref.	9th	
2006–07	5	Reg. Pref.	7th	
2007–08	5	Reg. Pref.	13th	

Season	Tier	Division	Place	Copa del Rey
2008–09	5	Reg. Pref.	9th	
2009–10	5	Pref.	10th	
2010–11	5	Pref.	1st	
2011–12	4	3ª	19th	
2012–13	5	Pref.	1st	
2013–14	4	3ª	21st	
2014–15	5	Pref.	13th	
2015–16	5	Pref.	11th	
2016–17	5	Pref.	5th	
2017–18	5	Pref.	1st	
2018–19	4	3ª	19th	
2019–20	5	Pref.	5th	
2020–21	5	Pref.	13th	
2021–22	6	Pref.	9th	
2022–23	6	Pref.	8th	
2023–24	6	Pref.	6th	
2024–25	6	1ª Aut.	6th	
2025–26	6	1ª Aut.		

- 12 seasons in Tercera División

== Uniforms ==
- First kit: Blue shirt, white shorts and white socks.
- Alternative kit: White shirt, black shorts and black socks.

== Stadium ==
- Name: Municipal de Vicálvaro
- Capacity: 2,250 spectators
- Dimensions: 105 x 65
