= Siello FC =

Siello
- Full name: Siello Football Club
- Founded: 1992 (as Villanueva del Pardillo); 2024 (as Siello FC)
- Ground: Orcasitas, Madrid, Spain
- Capacity: 1,000
- President: David Sierra
- Manager: Chiqui
- League: Tercera Federación – Group 7
- 2025–26: Tercera Federación – Group 7, 12th of 18
- Website: www.siello.football
Home colours	Away colours

Siello Football Club (officially Club Deportivo Básico Siello Football Club), formerly Fútbol Club Villanueva del Pardillo, is a Spanish football team based in Madrid. Founded in 1992, they play in Tercera Federación – Group 7.

== History ==
Founded in 1992 as Atlético Villanueva del Pardillo in Villanueva del Pardillo, the club changed name to Fútbol Club Villanueva del Pardillo in the following year. After playing in the regional leagues, they achieved a first-ever promotion to Tercera División in 2014.

In 2024, after suffering relegation from Tercera Federación, Villanueva del Pardillo was acquired by Siello Football Group, changing name to Siello Football Club. On 1 June of the following year, the club returned to the fifth tier.

=== Club background ===
- Atlético Villanueva del Pardillo (1992–1993)
- Fútbol Club Villanueva del Pardillo (1993–2024)
- Siello Football Club (2024–)

== Season to season ==
Season	Tier	Division	Place	Copa del Rey
1992–93	8	3ª Reg.	1st	
1993–94	7	2ª Reg.	3rd	
1994–95	6	1ª Reg.	18th	
1995–96	7	2ª Reg.	14th	
1996–97	7	2ª Reg.	17th	
1997–98	8	3ª Reg.	10th	
1998–99	8	3ª Reg.	1st	
1999–2000	7	2ª Reg.	1st	
2000–01	6	1ª Reg.	13th	
2001–02	6	1ª Reg.	14th	
2002–03	7	2ª Reg.	8th	
2003–04	7	2ª Reg.	9th	
2004–05	7	2ª Reg.	5th	
2005–06	7	2ª Reg.	1st	
2006–07	6	1ª Reg.	5th	
2007–08	6	1ª Reg.	4th	
2008–09	6	1ª Reg.	2nd	
2009–10	5	Pref.	8th	
2010–11	5	Pref.	8th	
2011–12	5	Pref.	16th	

Season	Tier	Division	Place	Copa del Rey
2012–13	6	1ª Afic.	1st	
2013–14	5	Pref.	2nd	
2014–15	4	3ª	17th	
2015–16	5	Pref.	1st	
2016–17	4	3ª	19th	
2017–18	5	Pref.	3rd	
2018–19	5	Pref.	6th	
2019–20	5	Pref.	2nd	
2020–21	4	3ª	10th / 3rd	
2021–22	6	Pref.	4th	
2022–23	6	Pref.	2nd	
2023–24	5	3ª Fed.	17th	
2024–25	6	1ª Aut.	2nd	
2025–26	5	3ª Fed.	12th	
2026–27	5	3ª Fed.		

- 3 seasons in Tercera División
- 3 seasons in Tercera Federación

== Honours ==
- Campeonato Regional Centro: 1914–15, 1918–19
