= CDF Tres Cantos =

Spanish football team

Tres Cantos
- Full name: Club Deportivo Fútbol Tres Cantos
- Founded: 2005; 21 years ago
- Ground: La Foresta A, Tres Cantos, Madrid, Spain
- Capacity: 2,000
- President: Álvaro Castiella
- League: Primera Autonómica de Aficionados – Group 1
- 2025–26: Tercera Federación – Group 7, 16th of 18 (relegated)
- Website: trescantoscdf.es
Home colours	Away colours

Club Deportivo Fútbol Tres Cantos is a Spanish football team based in Tres Cantos, Community of Madrid. Founded in 2005, it plays in Primera Autonómica de Aficionados – Group 1, holding home matches at Campo Municipal de Fútbol La Foresta A.

== History ==
Founded in 2005 as a merger between CD Tres Cantos Balompié and CD Embarcaciones, Tres Cantos achieved immediate promotion to Primera Regional in its first season. In 2008, after a fusion with CD La Paz, the club achieved an administrative promotion to Regional Preferente.

Tres Cantos achieved promotion to Tercera División in June 2017, after finishing third in the regular season. On 4 July of the following year, the club became CF Rayo Majadahonda's reserve team, after an agreement between both sides was reached.

In April 2020, after Rayo Majadahonda announced an affiliation with CD Paracuellos Antamira (formerly Alcobendas Sport), the agreement with Tres Cantos was cancelled.

== Season to season ==
Season	Tier	Division	Place	Copa del Rey
2005–06	7	2ª Reg.	1st	
2006–07	6	1ª Reg.	7th	
2007–08	6	1ª Reg.	6th	
2008–09	5	Reg. Pref.	11th	
2009–10	5	Pref.	11th	
2010–11	5	Pref.	11th	
2011–12	5	Pref.	15th	
2012–13	6	1ª Afic.	1st	
2013–14	5	Pref.	4th	
2014–15	5	Pref.	8th	
2015–16	5	Pref.	7th	
2016–17	5	Pref.	3rd	
2017–18	4	3ª	16th	
2018–19	4	3ª	20th	N/A (Note: Reserve team of Rayo Majadahonda.)
2019–20	5	Pref.	7th	N/A
2020–21	5	Pref.	2nd	
2021–22	5	3ª RFEF	15th	
2022–23	6	Pref.	1st	
2023–24	5	3ª Fed.	7th	
2024–25	5	3ª Fed.	11th	

Season	Tier	Division	Place	Copa del Rey
2025–26	5	3ª Fed.	16th	
2026–27	6	1ª Aut.		

- 2 seasons in Tercera División
- 4 seasons in Tercera Federación/Tercera División RFEF
