= Alcobendas CF =

Spanish football club

Alcobendas
- Full name: Alcobendas Club de Fútbol
- Founded: 1970; 56 years ago
- Ground: Luis Aragones, Alcobendas, Madrid, Spain
- Capacity: 1,000
- Chairman: Alberto Pérez Borrachero
- Manager: Eduardo Garrido
- League: Primera Autonómica de Aficionados – Group 1
- 2025–26: Preferente de Aficionados – Group 1, 2nd of 18 (promoted)
- Website: http://www.alcobendascf.com/
Home colours	Away colours

Alcobendas Club de Fútbol is a Spanish football club based in Alcobendas, in the Community of Madrid. Founded in 1970, it plays in Preferente de Aficionados – Group 1, holding home games at Valdelasfuentes, which has a capacity of 1,000 spectators.

== History ==
Founded in 1970 as Agrupación Deportiva Alcobendas, the club enjoyed 10 seasons in the fourth division in 15 years, but spent the vast majority of its existence in the Madrid regional leagues. In 2010, it was renamed Alcobendas Club de Fútbol.

=== Club background ===
- Agrupación Deportiva Alcobendas (1970–2010)
- Alcobendas Club de Fútbol (2010–2013; 2020–)
- Alcobendas-Levitt Club de Fútbol (2013–2020)

== Season to season ==
Crest of the club until 2008–09

Season	Tier	Division	Place	Copa del Rey
1970–71	6	3ª Reg.	3rd	
1971–72	6	3ª Reg.	2nd	
1972–73	5	2ª Reg.	5th	
1973–74	5	1ª Reg.	10th	
1974–75	5	1ª Reg.	6th	
1975–76	5	1ª Reg.	7th	
1976–77	5	1ª Reg.	2nd	
1977–78	5	Reg. Pref.	14th	
1978–79	6	1ª Reg.	2nd	
1979–80	5	Reg. Pref.	6th	
1980–81	4	3ª	9th	
1981–82	4	3ª	18th	
1982–83	4	3ª	19th	
1983–84	5	Reg. Pref.	5th	
1984–85	5	Reg. Pref.	4th	
1985–86	5	Reg. Pref.	14th	
1986–87	5	Reg. Pref.	7th	
1987–88	4	3ª	11th	
1988–89	4	3ª	11th	
1989–90	4	3ª	12th	

Season	Tier	Division	Place	Copa del Rey
1990–91	4	3ª	10th	
1991–92	4	3ª	19th	
1992–93	5	Reg. Pref.	1st	
1993–94	4	3ª	15th	
1994–95	4	3ª	20th	
1995–96	5	Reg. Pref.	14th	
1996–97	5	Reg. Pref.	6th	
1997–98	5	Reg. Pref.	9th	
1998–99	5	Reg. Pref.	5th	
1999–2000	5	Reg. Pref.	3rd	
2000–01	5	Reg. Pref.	3rd	
2001–02	5	Reg. Pref.	15th	
2002–03	6	1ª Reg.	3rd	
2003–04	5	Reg. Pref.	7th	
2004–05	5	Reg. Pref.	15th	
2005–06	6	1ª Reg.	7th	
2006–07	6	1ª Reg.	2nd	
2007–08	5	Reg. Pref.	8th	
2008–09	5	Reg. Pref.	6th	
2009–10	5	Pref.	4th	

Season	Tier	Division	Place	Copa del Rey
2010–11	5	Pref.	4th	
2011–12	5	Pref.	5th	
2012–13	5	Pref.	3rd	
2013–14	5	Pref.	1st	
2014–15	4	3ª	18th	
2015–16	5	Pref.	3rd	
2016–17	4	3ª	17th	
2017–18	5	Pref.	14th	
2018–19	5	Pref.	5th	
2019–20	5	Pref.	8th	
2020–21	5	Pref.	4th	
2021–22	6	Pref.	13th	
2022–23	7	1ª Afic.	12th	
2023–24	7	1ª Afic.	8th	
2024–25	7	Pref. Afic.	5th	
2025–26	7	Pref. Afic.	2nd	
2026–27	6	1ª Aut.		

- 13 seasons in Tercera División
