= Divisiones Regionales de Fútbol in the Community of Madrid =

The Divisiones Regionales de Fútbol in the Community of Madrid, are organized by the Madrid Football Federation:

- Primera Autonómica de Aficionados, 2 Groups of 18 teams (Level 6 of the Spanish football pyramid)
- Categoría Preferente de Aficionados, 4 Groups of 18 teams (Level 7)
- Categoría Primera de Aficionados, 8 Groups of 18 teams (Level 8)
- Categoría Segunda de Aficionados, 22 Groups of 16 teams (Level 9)

== League chronology ==
Timeline

== Primera Autonómica de Aficionados ==
Primera Autonómica
- Founded: 1986
- Country: Spain
- Number of clubs: 2 groups of 18 teams each one
- Level on pyramid: 6
- Promotion to: 3ª Federación - Group 7
- Relegation to: Preferente Aficionados
- Domestic cup: None
- Website: http://www.ffmadrid.org/pnfg/

Primera Autonómica de Aficionados is the sixth level of competition of the Spanish Football League in the Community of Madrid.

=== Competition System ===
The league consists of two groups of 18 teams. At the end of the season the first two teams from each group are promoted to the Tercera Federación (Group 7). The last four of each group (15th, 16th, 17th and 18th) are relegated to 'Preferente de Aficionados.

At this level, a reserve team and its parent can play at the same level in different groups. If the reserve team are in the promotion zone, the first team is promoted. If both teams are in the promotion zone, the third placed club within the group will be promoted. If the first team finishes in the relegation zone, the reserve team is demoted.

=== 2026–27 teams ===
==== Group 1 ====
- Alcobendas
- Aravaca
- Canillas
- Colmenar Viejo
- Coslada
- Daganzo
- Las Rozas B
- Moratalaz
- Nuevo Baztán
- Periso
- Pozuelo de Alarcón B
- Robledo
- San Agustín
- San Fernando de Henares
- Sporting Hortaleza
- Tres Cantos
- Unión Adarve B
- Vicálvaro

==== Group 2 ====
- Alcorcón B
- Aluche
- Arroyomolinos
- Atlético Pinto
- Atlético Valdeiglesias
- Carabanchel
- Ciempozuelos
- El Álamo
- Fortuna
- Griñón
- Inter Valdemoro
- Navalcarnero B
- Parla
- Racing Madrid
- Trival Valderas Promesas
- Usera
- Villaverde San Andrés
- Villaviciosa Odón

=== Champions ===
Season	Group I	Group II
2025–26	Rayo Ciudad Alcobendas CF	CP Parla Escuela
2024–25	San Sebastián de los Reyes B	Racing Madrid
2023–24	Cala Pozuelo	Carabanchel
2022–23	Tres Cantos	CD Colonia Moscardo
2021–22	Canillas	Internacional
2020–21	Galapagar	Ursaria
2019–20	Complutense	Móstoles CF
2018–19	Moratalaz	El Álamo
2017–18	Las Rozas CF	Carabanchel
2016–17	Colmenar Viejo	CP Parla Escuela
2015–16	FC Villanueva del Pardillo	SR Villaverde-Boetticher CF
2014–15	Aravaca CF	CD Colonia Moscardó
2013–14	Alcobendas-Levitt CF	CD Móstoles URJC

== Preferente de Aficionados ==
Preferente
- Founded: 1986
- Country: Spain
- Number of clubs: 72; 4 groups of 18
- Level on pyramid: 7
- Promotion to: Primera Autonómica
- Relegation to: Primera Aficionados
- Domestic cup: None
- Website: http://www.ffmadrid.org/pnfg/

Preferente de Aficionados is the seventh level of competition in the Spanish league football in Madrid.

The league consists of four groups of 18 teams. At the end of the season, the first two teams from each group are promoted to the Preferente.

The last four classified in each group are relegated to the Primera de Aficionados.

The first team and its reserve teams (maximum of three) can play on the same level in different groups. The first team is prompted whenever a reserve team is in the promotion zone. If the first team is in the relegation zone, the lowest reserve team is demoted.

=== 2025–26 teams ===
==== Group 1 ====
- Alcobendas
- Carranza
- Céltic Castilla
- Cerceda
- Chopera Alcobendas
- Electrocor
- FPA Las Rozas
- Fundación
- Galapagar B
- Hoyo de Manzanares
- Juventud Sanse
- La Moraleja
- Moralzarzal
- Pozuelo de Alarcón B
- Puerta de Madrid
- Santa Ana
- Tres Cantos B
- Unión de Aravaca

==== Group 2 ====
- Almudena
- Atlético Artilleros
- Avance
- Canillas B
- Cobeña
- Dosa
- Esperanza
- Fuente El Saz
- Henares Distrito IV
- La Plata
- Mejoreño
- Naya
- Nuevo Baztán
- Periso
- Recuerdo
- San Roque
- Sporting Hortaleza B
- Unión Valdebernardo

==== Group 3 ====
- Águilas de Moratalaz
- Alzola-Halcones
- Arganzuela
- Atlético de Pinto
- Betis San Isidro
- Carabanchel B
- CD Ciudad de los Ángeles
- Ciudad de Pinto
- Colonia Moscardó B
- EF Arganda
- EF Carabanchel
- Elida Olimpia
- Madrid Río
- Moratalaz B
- Nuevo Pinto
- Rivas
- Santa María del Pilar
- Sitio de Aranjuez

==== Group 4 ====
- Amistad
- Arroyomolinos
- Atlético Cañada
- Atlético Casarrubuelos
- Atlético Valdeiglesias
- Ciudad de Getafe
- Fepe Getafe III
- Griñón B
- Humanes
- Leganés C
- Los Yébenes San Bruno
- Lucero Linces
- Miraflor
- Moraleja de Enmedio
- Móstoles Balompié
- Móstoles CF
- Nuevo Boadilla
- Villa del Prado

== Primera de Aficionados ==
Primera de Aficionados
- Founded: 1986
- Country: Spain
- Number of clubs: 144; 8 groups of 18
- Level on pyramid: 8
- Promotion to: Preferente Aficionados
- Relegation to: Segunda Aficionados
- Domestic cup: None
- Website: http://www.ffmadrid.org/pnfg/

The Primera de Aficionados is the eighth level of competition in the Spanish League Football in the Community of Madrid. It lies immediately below the Preferente de Aficionados.

The league consists of 8 groups, each consisting of 18 teams. At the end of the season, the first 2 teams in each group promoted to the Preferente de Aficionados.

The last 2 teams of each group and the six worst 16th-placed teams are relegated to the Segunda de Aficionados.

The first team is promoted whenever a reserve team is in the promotion zone. The reserve team is demoted whenever the first team is in the relegation zone.

=== Some teams playing in this level ===
- AD El Pardo
- AF Alcobendas-Gandarío

== Segunda de Aficionados ==
Segunda de Aficionados
- Founded: 1986
- Country: Spain
- Number of clubs: 352; 22 groups of 16
- Level on pyramid: 9
- Promotion to: Primera Aficionados
- Domestic cup: None
- Website: http://www.ffmadrid.org/pnfg/

The Segunda de Aficionados is the ninth level of competition in the Spanish League Football in the Community of Madrid. It lies immediately below the Primera de Aficionados.

The league consists of 22 groups of 16 teams. At the end of the season the first 2 teams in each group are promoted to the Primera de Aficionados.

The first team is promoted whenever a reserve team is the promotion zone.
