= CD Humanes =

Spanish football club

Humanes
- Full name: Club Deportivo Humanes
- Founded: 1951; 75 years ago
- Ground: Emilio Zazo; Humanes de Madrid; Comunidad de Madrid, Spain
- Capacity: 2,000
- President: (Spain) Pablo Ángel Castaño Ludeña
- Head coach: (Spain) Fernando Alonso
- League: Preferente de Aficionados – Group 4
- 2024–25: Preferente de Aficionados – Group 4, 5th of 18
- Website: http://www.cdhumanes.es
Home colours	Away colours

Club Deportivo Humanes is a Spanish football club based in Humanes de Madrid, in the Community of Madrid. Founded in 1951, it plays in Preferente de Aficionados – Group 4.

== History ==
The club was founded in Humanes in 1951 as the town's main football club.

In 2007, the club achieved direct promotion to Tercera División for the first time in its history after finishing second in their group of Preferente. The team, therefore, debuted in Tercera División in the 2007-08 campaign, struggling to stay in the category and failing to avoid relegation. The following year the club returned to Preferente.

== Season to season ==
Season	Tier	Division	Place	Copa del Rey
1975–76	8	3ª Reg.	11th	
1976–77	8	3ª Reg.	2nd	
1977–78	8	3ª Reg. P.	12th	
1978–79	8	3ª Reg. P.	12th	
1979–80	8	3ª Reg. P.	9th	
1980–81	8	3ª Reg. P.	11th	
1981–82	8	3ª Reg. P.	1st	
1982–83	7	2ª Reg.	4th	
1983–84	6	1ª Reg.	10th	
1984–85	6	1ª Reg.	13th	
1985–86	6	1ª Reg.	3rd	
1986–87	5	Reg. Pref.	15th	
1987–88	5	Reg. Pref.	4th	
1988–89	5	Reg. Pref.	8th	
1989–90	5	Reg. Pref.	15th	
1990–91	6	1ª Reg.	1st	
1991–92	5	Reg. Pref.	8th	
1992–93	5	Reg. Pref.	12th	
1993–94	5	Reg. Pref.	15th	
1994–95	6	1ª Reg.	12th	

Season	Tier	Division	Place	Copa del Rey
1995–96	6	1ª Reg.	4th	
1996–97	6	1ª Reg.	5th	
1997–98	6	1ª Reg.	8th	
1998–99	6	1ª Reg.	3rd	
1999–2000	6	1ª Reg.	5th	
2000–01	6	1ª Reg.	12th	
2001–02	6	1ª Reg.	9th	
2002–03	6	1ª Reg.	4th	
2003–04	6	1ª Reg.	7th	
2004–05	6	1ª Reg.	6th	
2005–06	6	1ª Reg.	1st	
2006–07	5	Reg. Pref.	2nd	
2007–08	4	3ª	18th	
2008–09	5	Reg. Pref.	18th	
2009–10	6	1ª Afic.	17th	
2010–11	7	2ª Afic.	11th	
2011–12	7	2ª Afic.	3rd	
2012–13	6	1ª Afic.	9th	
2013–14	6	1ª Afic.	14th	
2014–15	7	2ª Afic.	6th	

Season	Tier	Division	Place	Copa del Rey
2015–16	7	2ª Afic.	4th	
2016–17	7	2ª Afic.	3rd	
2017–18	7	2ª Afic.	1st	
2018–19	6	1ª Afic.	5th	
2019–20	6	1ª Afic.	2nd	
2020–21	5	Pref.	16th	
2021–22	7	1ª Afic.	10th	
2022–23	7	1ª Afic.	6th	
2023–24	7	1ª Afic.	4th	
2024–25	7	Pref. Afic.	5th	
2025–26	7	Pref. Afic.		

- 1 season in Tercera División

== Uniform ==
- Home Kit: Blue shirt, blue shorts and blue socks.
- Away Kit: Red shirt, white trousers and red socks.

== Stadium ==
CD Humanes plays its home matches in the town's municipal stadium, Emilio Zazo, with capacity for 2,000 spectators and artificial turf.
