= CD San Fernando de Henares =

Association football club in Spain

San Fernando
- Full name: Club Deportivo San Fernando de Henares
- Founded: 1929
- Ground: Santiago del Pino, San Fernando, Madrid, Spain
- Capacity: 1,500
- Chairman: José Antonio Leyva
- Manager: Luis Díaz
- League: Primera Autonómica de Aficionados – Group 1
- 2025–26: Primera Autonómica de Aficionados – Group 1, 9th of 18
- Website: https://www.cdsanfernando.es/
Home colours	Away colours

Club Deportivo San Fernando is a Spanish football club based in San Fernando de Henares, in the Community of Madrid. Founded in 1929, it currently plays in Primera Autonómica de Aficionados – Group 1, holding home games at Estadio Santiago del Pino.

== History ==
San Fernando de Henares was founded in 1929 under the name Sociedad Recreativa San Fernando, when several locals decide to create an amateur soccer team. In 1943 the club became federated, and, on 21 October 1953, it changed its name to Club Deportivo San Fernando.

San Fernando was promoted to the first regional division in 1972–73, first reaching the fourth division five years later, and went on to remain in that level for the following three decades, returning to the Preferente in 2008–09, but promoting back immediately, as champions. In the 1980s the club won its first trophy, defeating CD Ciempozuelos in the first-ever Community of Madrid Cup.

In the 2006–07 season San Fernando finished third in the regular season, but fell short in the third division promotion playoffs, being ousted by CD Dénia.

== Season to season ==
Season	Tier	Division	Place	Copa del Rey
1953–54	7	4ª Reg.	5th	
1954–55	7	4ª Reg.	8th	
1955–56	7	4ª Reg.	5th	
1956–57	7	4ª Reg.	11th	
1957–58	7	4ª Reg.	11th	
1958–59	7	4ª Reg.	5th	
1959–60	7	4ª Reg.	8th	
1960–61	6	3ª Reg.	14th	
1961–62	6	3ª Reg.	13th	
1962–63	6	3ª Reg.	1st	
1963–64	5	2ª Reg.	4th	
1964–65	5	2ª Reg.	5th	
1965–66	5	2ª Reg.	14th	
1966–67	5	2ª Reg.	16th	
1967–68	5	2ª Reg.	2nd	
1968–69	5	2ª Reg.	12th	
1969–70	5	2ª Reg.	4th	
1970–71	5	2ª Reg.	5th	
1971–72	5	2ª Reg.	3rd	
1972–73	5	2ª Reg.	3rd	

Season	Tier	Division	Place	Copa del Rey
1973–74	5	1ª Reg.	5th	
1974–75	4	Reg. Pref.	8th	
1975–76	4	Reg. Pref.	7th	
1976–77	4	Reg. Pref.	8th	
1977–78	5	Reg. Pref.	1st	
1978–79	4	3ª	7th	Second round
1979–80	4	3ª	7th	First round
1980–81	4	3ª	17th	Second round
1981–82	4	3ª	14th	
1982–83	4	3ª	11th	
1983–84	4	3ª	17th	
1984–85	4	3ª	12th	
1985–86	4	3ª	18th	
1986–87	5	Reg. Pref.	1st	
1987–88	4	3ª	8th	
1988–89	4	3ª	7th	
1989–90	4	3ª	19th	
1990–91	5	Reg. Pref.	1st	
1991–92	4	3ª	14th	
1992–93	4	3ª	7th	

Season	Tier	Division	Place	Copa del Rey
1993–94	4	3ª	13th	
1994–95	4	3ª	12th	
1995–96	4	3ª	14th	
1996–97	4	3ª	16th	
1997–98	4	3ª	7th	
1998–99	4	3ª	19th	
1999–2000	5	Reg. Pref.	2nd	
2000–01	4	3ª	16th	
2001–02	4	3ª	12th	
2002–03	4	3ª	10th	
2003–04	4	3ª	7th	
2004–05	4	3ª	15th	
2005–06	4	3ª	11th	
2006–07	4	3ª	3rd	
2007–08	4	3ª	17th	
2008–09	5	Reg. Pref.	1st	
2009–10	4	3ª	12th	
2010–11	4	3ª	17th	
2011–12	5	Pref.	3rd	
2012–13	4	3ª	12th	

Season	Tier	Division	Place	Copa del Rey
2013–14	4	3ª	8th	
2014–15	4	3ª	16th	
2015–16	4	3ª	5th	
2016–17	4	3ª	12th	
2017–18	4	3ª	6th	
2018–19	4	3ª	8th	
2019–20	4	3ª	17th	
2020–21	4	3ª	11th / 7th	
2021–22	6	Pref.	15th	
2022–23	7	1ª Afic.	2nd	
2023–24	6	Pref.	14th	
2024–25	6	1ª Aut.	7th	
2025–26	6	1ª Aut.	9th	
2026–27	6	1ª Aut.		

- 38 seasons in Tercera División

== Play-off results 2007 ==
Opponent	Date	First leg	Date	Second leg
CD Roquetas	03/06	1–0	10/06	0–0
CD Dénia	16/06	0–2	23/06	2–0

== Copa del Rey games ==
Season	Opponent	Round	First leg	Second leg
1978/79	Moscardó	1st	1-0	3-0
1978/79	AD Almería	2nd	1-0	1-2
1979/80	Don Benito	1st	3-1	3-0
1980/81	Toledo	1st	2-1	0-2
1980/81	Atlético Madrileño	2nd	1-2	1-3

== Uniform ==
- First kit: White shirt, shorts and socks.
- Alternative kit: Black shirt, shorts and socks.

== Stadium ==
C.D. San Fernando plays home matches at Estadio Santiago del Pino, with capacity for 1,300 spectators (seated). It has artificial turf (105 x 70) and a track field, and was inaugurated in a game with Real Madrid.

Previously, the team held its matches at Estadio Sánchez Lorbada, named as such after the neighbourhood in which it was located.

== Former players ==
- (Equatorial Guinea) Eloy
