= 2020 Copa Federación de España =

Tournament details
- Country: Spain
- Teams: 32 (in national phase)

Final positions
- Champions: Llagostera (1st title)
- Runners-up: Las Rozas

Tournament statistics
- Matches played: 30
- Goals scored: 83 (2.77 per match)
- Top goal scorer(s): Iván Limón; Sergio Cortés (3 goals)

The 2020 Copa Federación de España was the 28th edition of the Copa Federación de España, also known as Copa RFEF, a knockout competition for Spanish football clubs in Segunda División B and Tercera División.

The competition began in September with the first games of the Regional stages and ended in December with the final of the National tournament. As part of the new competition format started in 2019, the four semifinalists qualified to the Copa del Rey first round.

== Regional tournaments ==
=== Andalusia tournament ===
The Andalusia Football Federation (RFAF) decided to create the 'Copa RFAF' in 2020. The finalists would be the Andalusian representatives in the Copa Federación national phase.

The best Andalusian teams in groups 9 (Eastern Andalusia and Melilla) and 10 (Western Andalusia and Ceuta) of the 2019–20 Tercera División not qualified for the 2020–21 Copa del Rey were selected for the competition. The best and second-best qualified teams of each group were seeded and played the quarter-final matches against the fourth and third-best qualified teams of their groups, respectively. The semi-finals were then between the winners from the same group, in order to have one finalist, and therefore one team qualified for the national phase, from each group.

Eastern Andalusia		Western Andalusia	
1	Motril	1	Xerez Deportivo
2	Jaén	2	Utrera
3	Torredonjimeno	3	Atlético Antoniano
4	Antequera	4	Puente Genil

On 22 August, during the Assembly of the RFAF, the venues of the semi-finals and the final and the dates of all matches were announced.

Quarter-finals
22 and 26 September
Puente Genil	2	1	3
Xerez Deportivo	2	2	4
23 and 27 September
Atlético Antoniano	0	0	0
Utrera	2	1	3
22 and 26 September
Antequera	2	2	4
Motril	1	2	3
23 and 27 September
Torredonjimeno	1	1	2
Jaén	0	1	1

Semi-finals
2 October – Marbella
Xerez Deportivo	0 (5)
Utrera (p)	0 (6)
2 October – Marbella
Antequera	0 (3)
Torredonjimeno (p)	0 (5)

Final
4 October – Marbella
Utrera	4
Torredonjimeno	0

Semifinals

2 October	Xerez Deportivo	0–0 (5–6 p)	Utrera	Marbella
18:30		Report		Stadium: Marbella Football Center; Referee: José María Aranda Delgado
	Penalties
	Antonio Bello (penalty scored); Emmanuel Edet (penalty scored); Javilillo (penalty missed); Antonio Sánchez (penalty scored); Adri Rodríguez (penalty scored); Antonio Jesús (penalty scored); Oca (penalty missed)		(penalty scored) Álex del Río; (penalty missed) Adrián Trabazo; (penalty scored) Titi; (penalty scored) Jairo Caballero; (penalty scored) Kiki Padilla; (penalty scored) Álex Ortiz; (penalty scored) Plusco

2 October	Antequera	0–0 (3–5 p)	Torredonjimeno	Marbella
21:30		Report		Stadium: Municipal; Referee: Carlos Hidalgo Márquez
	Penalties
	Portillo (penalty scored); Luismi Gutiérrez (penalty scored); Rafilla (penalty missed); Sergio Díaz (penalty scored)		(penalty scored) Adri Delgado; (penalty scored) Antonio Hornero; (penalty scored) Mario; (penalty scored) José Manuel Lara; (penalty scored) Jorge Vela

Final

4 October	Utrera	4–0	Torredonjimeno	Marbella
12:00	Álex del Río 4'; Plusco 23', 68'; Titi 52'	Report		Stadium: Municipal; Referee: Manuel Camacho Garrote

=== Aragon tournament ===
Ejea and Brea joined the tournament.

==== Final ====
26 September	Ejea	1–1 (5–3 p)	Brea	Zaragoza
17:30	David Moreno 76'	Report	Miki 57'	Stadium: Pedro Sancho

=== Asturias tournament ===
Due to the delay on starting the competitions, the tournament was played in a reduced format based on single-match rounds. 12 teams joined the competition. Semifinals and Final were played at Estadio Hermanos Antuña, in Mieres with a limited maximum attendance of 1,000 spectators, after they were moved from Estadio Ganzábal, in Langreo due to an outbreak of the COVID-19 pandemic in Asturias.

Seeded teams joined the competition in the second round. In the first two rounds, if a match ended in a draw the best-ranked team qualified. In the semi-finals and the final, in case of draw there would be directly a penalty shootout, without playing any overtime.

The matches of the two first rounds were played at the stadium of the worst qualified team.

Seeded teams		Non-seeded teams			
1	Llanes^{TH}	5	Tuilla	9	Condal
2	Marino Luanco	6	Urraca	10	Mosconia
3	Covadonga	7	Gijón Industrial	11	Navarro
4	Caudal	8	L'Entregu	12	Lenense

First round
23 September
Condal	1
L'Entregu	1
23 September
Lenense	1
Tuilla	2
23 September (Note: Mosconia and Gijón Industrial changed the home-team advantage due to the lack of lightings at Mosconia's stadium.)
Gijón Industrial	0
Mosconia	0
23 September
Navarro	0
Urraca	2

Quarter-finals
27 September
L'Entregu	1
Llanes	0
27 September
Tuilla	1
Caudal	1
27 September
Gijón Industrial	0
Marino Luanco	4
27 September
Urraca	2
Covadonga	0

Semi-finals
30 September - Mieres
L'Entregu	0
Caudal	1
1 October - Mieres
Marino Luanco	1
Urraca	0

Final
4 October - Mieres
Caudal	1
Marino Luanco	0

==== Final ====
4 October	Caudal	1–0	Marino Luanco	Mieres
17:00	Llaneza 35'	Report		Stadium: Estadio Hermanos Antuña; Attendance: 500; Referee: Agudo Daza

=== Balearic Islands tournament ===
Platges de Calvià was directly selected by Federació de Futbol de les Illes Balears.

=== Basque Country tournament ===
Three teams joined the tournament: Balmaseda, Real Unión and Urduliz.

Semi-finals
27 September
Urduliz	0
Balmaseda	1

Final
30 September
Balmaseda	1
Real Unión	0

==== Final ====
30 September	Balmaseda	1–0	Real Unión	Balmaseda
20:00	Arkarazo 78'	Report		Stadium: La Baluga

=== Canary Islands tournament ===
Tenisca was directly selected by Federación Canaria de Fútbol due to sporting merits (being the better team qualified in 2019-20 Tercera División not yet qualified to Copa del Rey).

=== Cantabria tournament ===
Tropezón was directly selected by Federación Cántabra de Fútbol due to sporting merits (being the better team qualified in 2019-20 Tercera División not yet qualified to Copa del Rey).

=== Castile-La Mancha tournament ===
Eight teams joined the tournament.

Quarter-finals
27 September
La Solana	0 (3)
Calvo Sotelo (p)	0 (4)
26 September
Toledo	1
Torrijos	0
26 September
Azuqueca (p)	1 (4)
Guadalajara	1 (3)
26 September
Conquense (p)	2 (6)
Tarancón	2 (5)

Semi-finals
30 September
Calvo Sotelo (p)	2 (4)
Toledo	2 (3)
30 September
Azuqueca
Conquense (w.o.)

Final
4 October
Calvo Sotelo	1
Conquense	0

==== Final ====
4 October	Calvo Sotelo	1–0	Conquense	Puertollano
18:00	Hendrio 50'	Report		Stadium: Ciudad de Puertollano; Referee: Mora Correas

=== Castile and León tournament ===
Four teams joined the tournament: Arandina, Bupolsa, Santa Marta and Unionistas. The draw was made 22 September.

Semi-finals
26 September
Unionistas	1
Santa Marta	0
26 September
Arandina	2
Bupolsa	1

Final
4 October
Unionistas	3
Arandina	1

==== Final ====
4 October	Unionistas	3–1	Arandina	Salamanca
17:00	Aythami 6'; Marín 25'; Javi Navas 46'	Report	Jon Rojo (o.g.) 77'	Stadium: Reina Sofía

=== Catalonia tournament ===
Federació Catalana de Fútbol did not send any team to the tournament.

=== Extremadura tournament ===
18 teams joined the tournament, consisting in a single-game knockout tournament.

Preliminary round
19 September
Montijo	3
Calamonte	0
21 September
Aceuchal (w.o.)
Extremadura B

Round of 16
23 September
Arroyo	1 (2)
Moralo (p)	1 (4)
23 September
Racing Valverdeño (p)	2 (5)
Olivenza	2 (4)
24 September
Montijo	1
Aceuchal	0
20 September
Chinato	1
Plasencia	2
23 September
Campanario	1
Valdivia	0
20 September
Llerenense (p)	1 (6)
Azuaga	1 (5)
20 September
Miajadas	0
Trujillo	1
23 September
Fuente de Cantos	2
Jerez	0

Quarter-finals
27 September
Moralo	3
Racing Valverdeño	0
27 September
Montijo (p)	0 (4)
Plasencia	0 (3)
27 September
Campanario	1 (2)
Llerenense (p)	1 (4)
27 September
Trujillo	0
Fuente de Cantos	1

Semi-finals
29 September
Moralo	1
Montijo	0
1 October
Llerenense
Fuente de Cantos (w.o.)

Final
4 October - Solana de los Barros
Moralo	3
Fuente de Cantos	2

==== Final ====
4 October	Moralo	3–2	Fuente de Cantos	Solana de los Barros
17:00	Écija 7'; RSergio Gómez 59'; Roberto 90+3'	Report	Joaquín 49'; Marín 57'	Stadium: Municipal Alfredo Arnés Luna; Attendance: 250; Referee: Víctor Manuel Pavón Guillén

=== Galicia tournament ===
Estradense, Pontellas, Rápido de Bouzas and Silva joined the tournament. The draw was made 24 September.

Semi-finals
27 September
Estradense	3
Silva	0
30 September
Pontellas	1
Rápido de Bouzas	3

Final
4 October - Santiago de Compostela
Estradense	1 (5)
Rápido de Bouzas (p)	1 (6)

==== Final ====
4 October	Estradense	1–1 (5–6 p)	Rápido de Bouzas	Santiago de Compostela
12:00	José Piñeiro 83'	Report	Iago Martínez 2'	Stadium: Municipal Santa Isabel; Referee: Adrián García Rodríguez

=== La Rioja tournament ===
Three teams joined the tournament: Arnedo, Casalarreina and Náxara. The draw was made 22 September.

Semi-finals
27 September
Casalarreina	0
Náxara	1

Final
4 October - Logroño
Náxara	0
Arnedo	1

==== Final ====
4 October	Náxara	0–1	Arnedo	Logroño
17:00		Report	Javier Ruiz 31'	Stadium: Mundial 82

=== Madrid tournament ===
==== Preliminary round ====
Group 1

Pos	Team	Pld	W	D	L	GF	GA	GD	Pts	Qualification	MOS	UAD	TVA	LEG
1	Móstoles URJC	3	1	2	0	5	4	+1	5	Qualification to the final	—	—	2–2	1–0
2	Union Adarve	3	1	2	0	3	2	+1	5		2–2	—	1–0	—
3	Trival Valderas	3	0	2	1	3	4	−1	2		—	—	—	1–1
4	Leganés B	3	0	2	1	1	2	−1	2		—	0–0	—	—

Source: RFFM
Rules for classification: 1) Points; 2) Goal difference; 3) Number of goals scored; 4) Head-to-head results.

Group 2

Pos	Team	Pld	W	D	L	GF	GA	GD	Pts	Qualification	RAY	ALC	POZ	ACL
1	Rayo Vallecano B	3	3	0	0	7	3	+4	9	Qualification to the final	—	—	1–0	4–3
2	Alcorcón B	3	1	1	1	3	4	−1	4		0–2	—	—	0–0
3	Pozuelo	3	1	0	2	3	4	−1	3		—	2–3	—	—
4	Alcalá	3	0	1	2	3	5	−2	1		—	—	0–1	—

Source: RFFM
Rules for classification: 1) Points; 2) Goal difference; 3) Number of goals scored; 4) Head-to-head results.

==== Final ====
The final will be played in the García de la Mata field in Madrid. Each game will last 45 minutes.

Pos	Team	Pld	W	D	L	GF	GA	GD	Pts	Qualification	MOS	SSR	RAY
1	Móstoles URJC	2	1	1	0	1	0	+1	4	Qualified	—	—	—
2	San Sebastián de los Reyes	2	1	0	1	1	1	0	3		0–1	—	—
3	Rayo Vallecano B	2	0	1	1	0	1	−1	1		0–0	0–1	—

Source: RFFM
Rules for classification: 1) Points; 2) Goal difference; 3) Number of goals scored; 4) Head-to-head results.

7 October	Rayo Vallecano B	0–0 (4–5 p)	Móstoles URJC	Madrid
10:30		Report		Stadium: García de la Mata; Referee: Aarón Vázquez González
	Penalties
	Jorge Moreno (penalty scored); Carlos Hernández (penalty scored); Álex Cano (penalty scored); Marc Echarri (penalty scored); Álvaro Aguirre (penalty missed)		(penalty scored) Álvaro Portilla; (penalty scored) Juancar Jordán; (penalty scored) Fran Montávez; (penalty scored) Félix Ledesma; (penalty scored) Álex Claverías

7 October	Rayo Vallecano B	0–1	San Sebastián de los Reyes	Madrid
11:45		Report	Franck Fomeyem 34'	Stadium: García de la Mata; Referee: Luis Alonso Campos

7 October	San Sebastián de los Reyes	0–1	Móstoles URJC	Madrid
13:15		Report	Óscar Rivas 43'	Stadium: García de la Mata; Referee: Luis Alonso Campos

=== Murcia tournament ===
Mar Menor was directly selected by Federación de Fútbol de la Región de Murcia due to sporting merits (being the best team qualified in 2019–20 Tercera División that was not yet qualified to the Copa del Rey).

=== Navarre tournament ===
Beti Kozkor was directly selected by Federación Navarra de Fútbol due to sporting merits (being the better team qualified in 2019-20 Tercera División not yet qualified to Copa del Rey).

=== Valencian Community tournament ===
3 teams joined the tournament: Alzira, Intercity and Villajoyosa. The tournament was played in the Guillermo Olagüe field in Gandia. Each game lasted 45 minutes.

Pos	Team	Pld	W	D	L	GF	GA	GD	Pts	Qualification	INT	VIL	ALZ
1	Intercity	2	1	1	0	3	0	+3	4	Qualified	—	—	3–0
2	Villajoyosa	2	1	1	0	1	0	+1	4		0–0	—	—
3	Alzira	2	0	0	2	0	4	−4	0		—	0–1	—

Updated to match(es) played on unknown. Source: Federació de Fútbol de la Comunitat Valenciana
Rules for classification: 1) Points; 2) Goal difference; 3) Number of goals scored; 4) Head-to-head results.

29 September	Intercity	3–0	Alzira	Gandia
20:00	Piquero 4'; Cristian 33'; Escudero 36'			Stadium: Guillermo Olagüe; Referee: Eric Vélez

29 September	Alzira	0–1	Villajoyosa	Gandia
21:00			Iván 42' (pen.)	Stadium: Guillermo Olagüe; Referee: Pablo González del Rey

29 September	Villajoyosa	0–0	Intercity	Gandia
22:00		Report		Stadium: Guillermo Olagüe; Referee: Javier Villascusa

== National phase ==
National phase was played between October and December with 32 teams (18 winners of the Regional Tournaments and 14 teams of Segunda División B). The four semifinalists qualified to 2020–21 Copa del Rey first round.

Times are CET/CEST, (Note: CEST (UTC+2) for dates up to 24 October 2020 (rounds of 32 and 16), and CET (UTC+1) for dates thereafter (from quarter-finals onwards).) (local times, if different, are in parentheses).

=== Qualified teams ===
Best non-reserve teams from 2019–20 Segunda División B not qualified to 2020–21 Copa del Rey (3 from each group plus the next best 2 overall)

- (Basque Country (autonomous community)) Barakaldo (3)
- (Aragon) Ebro (3)
- (Catalonia) Gimnàstic (3)
- (Asturias) Langreo (3)
- (Community of Madrid) Las Rozas (3)
- (Catalonia) Llagostera (3)
- (Basque Country (autonomous community)) Leioa (3)
- Melilla (3)
- (Region of Murcia) Murcia (3)
- (Galicia (Spain)) Racing Ferrol (3)
- (Andalusia) Recreativo (3)
- (Castile and León) Salamanca UDS (3)
- (Region of Murcia) UCAM Murcia (3)
- (Castilla–La Mancha) Villarrubia (3)

Winners of Autonomous Communities tournaments

- (La Rioja) Arnedo (4)
- (Basque Country (autonomous community)) Balmaseda (4)
- (Navarre) Beti Kozkor (4)
- (Castilla–La Mancha) Calvo Sotelo (4)
- (Asturias) Caudal (4)
- (Aragon) Ejea (3)
- (Valencian Community) Intercity (4)
- (Region of Murcia) Mar Menor (4)
- (Extremadura) Moralo (4)
- (Balearic Islands) Platges de Calvià (4)
- (Galicia (Spain)) Rápido de Bouzas (4)
- (Canary Islands) Tenisca (4)
- (Andalusia) Torredonjimeno (4)
- (Cantabria) Tropezón (4)
- (Castile and León) Unionistas (3)
- (Andalusia) Utrera (4)
- (Community of Madrid) Móstoles URJC^{†} (4)
- (Catalonia) (Vacant)

- † The identity of this team was unknown at the time of the draw
- (3) Team playing in 2020–21 Segunda División B (third tier)
- (4) Team playing in 2020–21 Tercera División (fourth tier)

=== Draw ===
The draw of all the tournament was held at the headquarters of the RFEF on 5 October. Teams were divided into four pots according to geographical criteria. Each pot will play independently until the semi-finals.

Pot A	Pot B	Pot C	Pot D
(Canary Islands) Tenisca (Castile and León) Salamanca UDS (Castile and León) Unionistas (Galicia (Spain)) Racing Ferrol (Galicia (Spain)) Rápido de Bouzas (Community of Madrid) Las Rozas (Community of Madrid) Móstoles URJC^{†} Melilla	(Asturias) Caudal (Asturias) Langreo (Basque Country (autonomous community)) Balmaseda (Basque Country (autonomous community)) Barakaldo (Basque Country (autonomous community)) Leioa (Cantabria) Tropezón (La Rioja) Arnedo (Navarre) Beti Kozkor	(Aragon) Ebro (Aragon) Ejea (Balearic Islands) Platges de Calvià (Catalonia) Gimnàstic (Catalonia) Llagostera (Catalonia) (Vacant) (Region of Murcia) Mar Menor (Valencian Community) Intercity	(Andalusia) Torredonjimeno (Andalusia) Recreativo (Andalusia) Utrera (Castilla–La Mancha) Calvo Sotelo (Castilla–La Mancha) Villarrubia (Extremadura) Moralo (Region of Murcia) Murcia (Region of Murcia) UCAM Murcia

- † The identity of this team was unknown at the time of the draw

=== Bracket ===
Round of 32
11 October
Rápido de Bouzas	1
Melilla	4
11 October
Móstoles URJC	0
Unionistas	1
11 October
Las Rozas (a.e.t.)	3
Salamanca	1
11 October
Tenisca (a.e.t.)	3
Racing Ferrol	2
10 October
Leioa	1
Caudal	0
10 October
Langreo	3
Beti Kozkor	0
12 October
Balmaseda	1
Barakaldo	0
14 October
Arnedo	1
Tropezón	3
14 October
Llagostera (a.e.t.)	2
Ejea	1
10 October
Ebro	0
Gimnàstic	2
11 October
Platges de Calvià (p)	1 (4)
Intercity	1 (1)
10 October
Murcia	0
Calvo Sotelo (a.e.t.)	1
11 October
Torredonjimeno	1
Recreativo	0
10 October
Villarrubia	1
Utrera	0
11 October
Moralo	1
UCAM Murcia	2

Round of 16
21 October
Melilla (p)	2 (3)
Unionistas	2 (1)
22 October
Las Rozas	3
Tenisca	1
22 October
Leioa	2
Langreo	0
21 October
Balmaseda	0
Tropezón	2
22 October
Llagostera (a.e.t.)	2
Gimnàstic	1
22 October
Platges de Calvià (p)	2 (5)
Mar Menor	2 (4)
21 October
Calvo Sotelo	5
Torredonjimeno	2
21 October
Villarrubia	0
UCAM Murcia	1

Quarter-finals
28 October
Melilla	1
Las Rozas (a.e.t.)	2
11 November
Leioa	2
Tropezón	1
28 October
Llagostera	3
Platges de Calvià	0
28 October
Calvo Sotelo	1
UCAM Murcia (a.e.t.)	2

Semi-finals
19 November
Las Rozas	1
Leioa	0
18 November
Llagostera	2
UCAM Murcia	1

Final
2 December
Las Rozas	1
Llagostera (a.e.t.)	2

=== Round of 32 ===
Pot A

11 October	Rápido de Bouzas (4)	1–4	Melilla (3)	Vigo
12:00	Rey 62'	Report	Alberto González 9', 25'; Mawi 55'; Éder Díez 75'	Stadium: Baltasar Pujales; Referee: Luis José López Abelleira

11 October	Móstoles URJC (4)	0–1	Unionistas (3)	Móstoles
12:00		Report	Josué 85'	Stadium: El Soto; Attendance: 300; Referee: Domingo Sosa Gómez

11 October	Las Rozas (3)	3–1 (a.e.t.)	Salamanca UDS (3)	Las Rozas
12:00	Carlos Moreno 33'; Alberto Alburquerque 94'; David Barca 112'	Report	Luis Madrigal 90' (pen.)	Stadium: Navalcarbón; Referee: Héctor García Fernández

11 October	Tenisca (4)	3–2 (a.e.t.)	Racing Ferrol (3)	Santa Cruz de la Palma
12:00 (11:00 WEST)	Dani López 70', 98'; Joshua 90'	Report	Joselu 7'; Fer Beltrán 50'	Stadium: Virgen de Las Nieves; Attendance: 700; Referee: Cristian Naranjo Marín

Pot B

10 October	Leioa (3)	1–0	Caudal (4)	Leioa
17:00	Mikel Pradera 13'	Report		Stadium: Sarriena; Referee: Antonio Moroso Medialdea

10 October	Langreo (3)	3–0	Beti Kozkor (4)	Langreo
17:00	Davo Fernández 34'; Ketu 51'; De Baunbag 55'	Report		Stadium: Nuevo Ganzábal; Referee: Gustavo Vidal Fonseca

10 October	Balmaseda (4)	1–0	Barakaldo (3)	Balmaseda
18:00	Lambarri 57'	Report		Stadium: La Baluga; Referee: Alejandro Morilla Turrión

14 October	Arnedo (4)	1–3	Tropezón (4)	Arnedo
20:00	Nacho 84'	Report	Fresno 11'; Zorrilla 20'; Kevin 34'	Stadium: Sendero; Attendance: 0 Referee: Iker Ruia Ravana

Pot C

10 October	Ebro (3)	0–2	Gimnàstic (3)	Zaragoza
12:00		Report	Brugui 47'; Fran Miranda 77'	Stadium: Pedro Sancho; Referee: Rodrigo Sánchez Murcia

11 October	Platges de Calvià (4)	1–1 (a.e.t.) (4–1 p)	Intercity (4)	Calvià
11:30	Riveron 117'	Report	Piquero 96' (pen.)	Stadium: Municipal de Magaluf; Referee: Héctor Robas Bondia
	Penalties
	Orell (penalty scored); Matas (penalty scored); Riveron (penalty scored); Nilson (penalty scored)		(penalty missed) Álvaro Pérez; (penalty scored) Andy Escudero; (penalty missed) Luis García

14 October	Llagostera (3)	2–1 (a.e.t.)	Ejea (3)	Llagostera
17:30	Guiu 67'; Dieste 102'	Report	Theo Iosifidis 68'	Stadium: Municipal

Mar Menor (4) was given a bye to Round of 16.

Pot D

10 October	Murcia (3)	0–1 (a.e.t.)	Calvo Sotelo (4)	Murcia
18:00		Report	Hendrio 107'	Stadium: Nueva Condomina; Referee: Toni Bordoy Díaz

10 October	Villarrubia (3)	1–0	Utrera (4)	Villarrubia de los Ojos
18:00	Juan Arcas 20'	Report		Stadium: Municipal; Attendance: 0 Referee: Ignacio Bordons Romero

11 October	Torredonjimeno (4)	1–0	Recreativo (3)	Torredonjimeno
17:00	Hornero 16'	Report		Stadium: Matías Prats; Attendance: 800; Referee: Luis Alberto Marchante Flores

11 October	Moralo (4)	1–2	UCAM Murcia (3)	Navalmoral de la Mata
18:00	Suso 26'	Report	Xemi Fernández 41'; Javi Moreno 51'	Stadium: Municipal; Attendance: 600; Referee: Alberto Sánchez Ingidua

=== Round of 16 ===
Pot A

21 October	Melilla (3)	2–2 (a.e.t.) (3–1 p)	Unionistas (3)	Melilla
20:00	Al Watani 10'; Mawi 45'	Report	Lama 3'; Pepe Carmona 34'	Stadium: Álvarez Claro; Referee: José María Aranda Delgado
	Penalties
	Alex Segura (penalty scored); Mawi (penalty scored); Borja Díaz (penalty scored)		(penalty scored) Álex Rey; (penalty missed) Viana; (penalty missed) Benja Garay; (penalty missed) Acosta

22 October	Las Rozas (3)	3–1	Tenisca (4)	Las Rozas
12:00	Álvaro Portero 13'; Gonzalo Expósito 66'; Losada 84'	Report	Agoney 78'	Stadium: Navalcarbón; Attendance: 100; Referee: Alejandro Clemente Ortuño

Pot B

21 October	Balmaseda (4)	0–2	Tropezón (4)	Balmaseda
20:00		Report	Perujo 43'; Javi Delgado 79'	Stadium: La Baluga; Attendance: 150; Referee: Sergio Calleja Castrillo

22 October	Leioa (3)	2–0	Langreo (3)	Leioa
19:00	Segado 18'; Guijarro 43'	Report		Stadium: Sarriena; Attendance: 0 Referee: Pablo González Redondo

Pot C

22 October	Platges de Calvià (4)	2–2 (a.e.t.) (5–4 p)	Mar Menor (4)	Calvià
19:30	Matas 25'; Javi Ramos 89'	Report	Nacho Pérez 56'; Jero 86'	Stadium: Municipal de Magaluf; Referee: Nicolás Gorcelán Docio
	Penalties
	Bueno (penalty scored); Gori (penalty scored); Borja (penalty scored); Edu (penalty scored); Bardo (penalty scored)		(penalty scored) Nacho Pérez; (penalty scored) Juanlu; (penalty scored) Hamza; (penalty scored) Parada; (penalty missed) Kilian

22 October	Llagostera (3)	2–1 (a.e.t.)	Gimnàstic (3)	Llagostera
20:00	Sascha 75'; Cortés 115' (pen.)	Report	Bonilla 42'	Stadium: Municipal; Referee: Alfredo Ramo Andrés

Pot D

21 October	Villarrubia (3)	0–1	UCAM Murcia (3)	Villarrubia de los Ojos
18:00		Report	Javi Moreno 77'	Stadium: Municipal; Referee: Pablo González Umbert

21 October	Calvo Sotelo (4)	5–2	Torredonjimeno (4)	Puertollano
20:00	Domenech 40'; Valdivia 48'; Iván Limón 63', 65', 90'	Report	Mario 8', 50'	Stadium: Ciudad de Puertollano; Referee: David Torres Carrión

=== Quarter-finals ===
Winners qualified to the 2020–21 Copa del Rey first round.

Pot A

28 October	Melilla (3)	1–2 (a.e.t.)	Las Rozas (3)	Melilla
18:30	Al Watani 11'	Report	Álvaro Molina 60' (o.g.); Carlos Indiano 101' (pen.)	Stadium: Álvarez Claro; Attendance: 0 Referee: Manuel Cantón Martos

Pot B

11 November	Leioa (3)	2–1	Tropezón (4)	Leioa
19:00	Berasaluze 27'; Goti 79'	Report	Fresno 42'	Stadium: Sarriena; Referee: Juan González Suárez

Pot C

28 October	Llagostera (3)	3–0	Platges de Calvià (4)	Llagostera
18:00	Sascha 71'; Cortés 75'; Gil Muntadas 80'	Report		Stadium: Municipal; Attendance: 250; Referee: Manuel Ramírez Marco

Pot D

28 October	Calvo Sotelo (4)	1–2 (a.e.t.)	UCAM Murcia (3)	Puertollano
19:00	Domenech 11'	Report	Mounir 43'; Mustafá 100'	Stadium: Ciudad de Puertollano; Attendance: 750; Referee: José Antonio Muñoz Blázquez

=== Semi-finals ===
18 November	Llagostera (3)	2–1	UCAM Murcia (3)	Llagostera
17:30	Lucas Viale 31', 42'	Report	Ramón Marínez 70'	Stadium: Municipal; Attendance: 0 Referee: Manuel Gómez Gómez

19 November	Las Rozas (3)	1–0	Leioa (3)	Las Rozas
12:00	Algarra 83'	Report		Stadium: Navalcarbón; Referee: Álvaro Gómez-Miguel González

=== Final ===
2 December	Las Rozas (3)	1–2 (a.e.t.)	Llagostera (3)	Las Rozas
18:00	Carlos Indiano 112'	Report	Youssef 106'; Sergio Cortés 122'	Stadium: Navalcarbón; Referee: Daniel Miranda Bolaño

=== Top goalscorers ===
There were 83 goals scored in 30 matches, for an average of 2.77 goals per match.

Rank	Player	Team	Goals
1	(Spain) Iván Limón	Calvo Sotelo	3
1	(Spain) Sergio Cortés	Llagostera	3
3	(Spain) Alberto González	Melilla	2
3	(Spain) Dani López	Tenisca	2
3	(Spain) Fernando Domenech	Calvo Sotelo	2
3	(Morocco) Youssef el Watani	Melilla	2
3	(Spain) Juan Fresno	Tropezón	2
3	(Spain) Carlos Indiano	Las Rozas	2
3	(Spain) Javi Moreno	UCAM Murcia	2
3	(Spain) Mario	Torredonjimeno	2
3	(Spain) Mawi	Melilla	2
3	(Spain) Sascha	Llagostera	2
3	(Argentina) Lucas Viale	Llagostera	2
