= 2021 Tercera División play-offs =

Spanish football league play-offs

The 2021 Tercera División play-offs to Segunda División RFEF from Tercera División (promotion play-offs) were the final play-offs for the promotion from 2020–21 Tercera División to 2021–22 Segunda División RFEF. The last four teams from the promotion groups and the top two clubs from the Play-off groups qualified for this stage.

== Format ==
Due to the health crisis caused by the COVID-19 pandemic in Spain, the RFEF decided for this season that there would be no games between teams from different Territorial Federations and thus not have problems with mobility restrictions. In addition, the remodeling of the RFEF national categories allows each Third Division group to have three promotion slots to the new Segunda División RFEF category, one of them through promotion play-offs.

Six teams qualify from each of the Third Division groups. Four of them come from the groups called "C" or "promotion", and are those classified between the third and sixth position since the first two achieve direct promotion. The other two teams come from the groups called "D" or "play-off", and are the first two classified.

As in the previous season, the promotion promotion was a single match in which the highest ranked teams has an advantage in the event of a tie. The fifth classified of group "C" faced the second classified of group "D"; and the sixth of the "C" did the same with the first of the "D". The winners of this first round faced the third and fourth teams of group "C" in the final round, deciding the third place for promotion in each of the groups.

== Qualified teams ==
Group 1		Group 2		Group 3		Group 4		Group 5		Group 6	
C3	**Arosa**	C3	L'Entregu	C3	**Tropezón**	C3	**Sestao River**	C3	**Terrassa**	C3	**Intercity**
C4	Polvorín	C4	San Martín	C4	Siete Villas	C4	Vitoria	C4	Girona B	C4	Elche Ilicitano
C5	Somozas	C5	**Real Avilés**	C5	Gimnástica Torrelavega	C5	Urduliz	C5	**Cerdanyola del Vallès**	C5	Roda
C6	Alondras	C6	Llanes	C6	Escobedo	C6	Pasaia	C6	Granollers	C6	Atlético Saguntino
D1	Estradense	D1	Tuilla	D1	Vimenor	D1	Anaitasuna	D1	Sant Andreu	D1	Villarreal C
D2	Choco	D2	Caudal	D2	Sámano	D2	Deusto	D2	Vilassar de Mar	D2	Silla
Group 7		Group 8		Group 9		Group 10		Group 11		Group 12	
C3	**Móstoles URJC**	C3	Atlético Astorga	C3	Torredonjimeno	C3	Ciudad de Lucena	C3	Platges de Calvià	C3	**San Fernando**
C4	Moratalaz	C4	**Burgos Promesas**	C4	**Antequera**	C4	Xerez	C4	**Formentera**	C4	Tenisca
C5	Alcorcón B	C6	Júpiter Leonés	C5	Almería B	C5	Puente Genil	C5	Constància	C5	Atlético Paso
C6	Rayo Vallecano B	D1	Arandina	C6	El Palo	C6	**Ceuta**	C6	Sant Jordi	D1	Buzanada
D1	Torrejón	D2	Mirandés B	D1	Atlético Malagueño	D2	Utrera	D1	Mallorca B	D2	Tenerife B
D2	Pozuelo de Alarcón	D3	Ávila	D2	Juventud Torremolinos	D3	Pozoblanco	D2	Santanyí	D3	Santa Úrsula
Group 13		Group 14		Group 15		Group 16		Group 17		Group 18	
C3	**Mar Menor**	C3	**Coria**	C3	Beti Kozkor	C3	Alfaro	C3	**Huesca B**	C3	**Toledo**
C4	Cartagena B	C4	Moralo	C4	**Ardoi**	C4	**UD Logroñés B**	C4	Cuarte	C4	Atlético Albacete
C5	Racing Murcia	C5	Diocesano	C5	Atlético Cirbonero	C5	Anguiano	C5	Belchite 97	C5	Quintanar del Rey
D1	La Unión Atlético	C6	Jerez	C6	Valle de Egüés	C6	Varea	C6	Utebo	C6	Torrijos
D2	Cartagena FC	D1	Plasencia	D1	Pamplona	D1	Calahorra B	D1	Barbastro	D1	Guadalajara
D3	Los Garres	D2	Miajadas	D2	Huarte	D2	Arnedo	D2	Binéfar	D2	Tarancón

- Teams in **bold** promoted to Segunda RFEF

== Group 1 – Galicia ==
Quarterfinals
C6	Alondras	0
D1	Estradense	1
C5	Somozas	1
D2	Choco	0

Semifinals
C3	Arosa (s)	0
D1	Estradense	0
C4	Polvorín	0
C5	Somozas	1

Final
C3	Arosa	2
C5	Somozas	0

- Promoted teams:
  - Promotion group: Arenteiro and Bergantiños
  - Play-off: Arosa

== Group 2 – Asturias ==
Quarter-finals
C5	Avilés	2
D2	Caudal	0
C6	Llanes (s)	1
D1	Tuilla	1

Semi-finals
C4	San Martín	0
C5	Avilés (a.e.t.)	1
C3	L'Entregu	1
C6	Llanes (a.e.t.)	3

Final
C5	Avilés	1
C6	Llanes	0

- Promoted teams:
  - Promotion group: Ceares and Llanera
  - Play-off: Avilés

== Group 3 – Cantabria ==
Quarterfinals
C6	Escobedo (s)	1
D1	Vimenor	1
C5	Gimnástica de Torrelavega	2
D2	Sámano	1

Semifinals
C3	Tropezón (a.e.t.)	2
C6	Escobedo	1
C4	Siete Villas (a.e.t.)	4
C5	Gimnástica de Torrelavega	2

Final
C3	Tropezón	2
C4	Siete Villas	0

- Promoted teams:
  - Promotion group: Cayón and Rayo Cantabria
  - Play-off: Tropezón

== Group 4 – Basque Country ==
Quarterfinals
C6	Pasaia	0
D1	Anaitasuna	1
C5	Urduliz (s)	0
D2	Deusto	0

Semifinals
C3	Sestao River	1
D1	Anaitasuna	0
C4	Vitoria	1
C5	Urduliz (a.e.t.)	2

Final
C3	Sestao River	2
C5	Urduliz	0

- Promoted teams:
  - Promotion group: Gernika and Real Sociedad C
  - Play-off: Sestao River

== Group 5 – Catalonia ==
Quarterfinals
C5	Cerdanyola del Vallès	3
D2	Vilassar de Mar	2
C6	Granollers	0
D1	Sant Andreu	1

Semifinals
C4	Girona B	2
C5	Cerdanyola del Vallès	3
C3	Terrassa	0
D1	Sant Andreu	1

Final
C5	Cerdanyola del Vallès (a.e.t.)	3
D1	Sant Andreu	1

- Promoted teams:
  - Promotion group: Europa and Terrassa
  - Play-off: Cerdanyola del Vallès

== Group 6 – Valencian Community ==
Quarter-finals
C6	Atlético Saguntino	0
D1	Villarreal C	3
C5	Roda	2
D2	Silla	1

Semi-finals
C3	Intercity (s)	0
D1	Villarreal C	0
C4	Elche Ilicitano	2
C5	Roda	0

Final
C3	Intercity	1
C4	Elche Ilicitano	0

- Promoted teams:
  - Promotion group: Eldense and Alzira
  - Play-off: Intercity

== Group 7 – Community of Madrid ==
Quarter-finals
C6	Rayo Vallecano B	0
D1	Torrejón	1
C5	Alcorcón	1
D2	Pozuelo de Alarcón	0

Semi-finals
C3	Móstoles URJC (s)	1
D1	Torrejón	1
C4	Moratalaz (s)	1
C5	Alcorcón	1

Final
C3	Móstoles URJC	2
C4	Moratalaz	1

- Promoted teams:
  - Promotion group: Leganés B and Unión Adarve
  - Play-off: Móstoles URJC

== Group 8 – Castile and León ==
Quarterfinals
C6	Júpiter Leonés	3
D3	Ávila	1
D1	Arandina	2
D2	Mirandés B	3

Semifinals
C4	Burgos Promesas	2
C6	Júpiter Leonés	1
C3	Atlético Astorga	0
D2	Mirandés B	1

Final
C4	Burgos Promesas (a.e.t.)	2
D2	Mirandés B	1

- Promoted teams:
  - Promotion group: Gimnástica Segoviana and Cristo Atlético
  - Play-off: Burgos Promesas

== Group 9 – Eastern Andalusia and Melilla ==
Quarterfinals
C5	Almería B	2
D2	Juventud Torremolinos	1
C6	El Palo	2
D1	Atlético Malagueño	3

Semifinals
C4	Antequera (s.)	0
C5	Almería B	0
C3	Torredonjimeno	1
D1	Atlético Malagueño	3

Final
C4	Antequera (a.e.t.)	1
D1	Atlético Malagueño	0

- Promoted teams:
  - Promotion group: Vélez and Atlético Mancha Real
  - Play-off: Antequera

== Group 10 – Western Andalusia and Ceuta ==
Quarterfinals
C5	Puente Genil	1
D3	Pozoblanco	0
C6	Ceuta (s)	3
D2	Utrera	3

Semifinals
C4	Xerez (s.)	1
C5	Puente Genil	1
C3	Ciudad de Lucena	1
C6	Ceuta	2

Final
C4	Xerez	0
C6	Ceuta	1

- Promoted teams:
  - Promotion group: Xerez Deportivo and San Roque de Lepe
  - Play-off: Ceuta

== Group 11 – Balearic Islands ==
Quarterfinals
C5	Constància	2
D2	Santanyí	0
C6	Sant Jordi	0
D1	Mallorca B	2

Semifinals
C4	Formentera	2
C5	Constància	0
C3	Platges de Calvià	0
D1	Mallorca B	1

Final
C4	Formentera (s)	0
D1	Mallorca B	0

- Promoted teams:
  - Promotion group: Ibiza Islas Pitiusas and Andratx
  - Play-off: Formentera

== Group 12 – Canary Islands ==
Quarterfinals
D1	Buzanada	3
D2	Tenerife B	2
C5	Atlético Paso (s)	1
D3	Santa Úrsula	1

Semifinals
C3	San Fernando (s)	1
D1	Buzanada	1
C4	Tenisca (s)	0
C5	Atlético Paso	0

Final
C3	San Fernando	3
C4	Tenisca	0

- Promoted teams:
  - Promotion group: Mensajero and Panadería Pulido
  - Play-off: San Fernando

== Group 13 – Region of Murcia ==
Quarterfinals
D1	La Unión Atlético	3
D2	Cartagena FC	1
C5	Racing Murcia (s)	0
D3	Los Garres	0

Semifinals
C3	Mar Menor (s)	0
D1	La Unión Atlético	0
C4	Cartagena B (s)	1
C5	Racing Murcia	1

Final
C3	Mar Menor (s)	1
C4	Cartagena B	1

- Promoted teams:
  - Promotion group: Águilas and Atlético Pulpileño
  - Play-off: Mar Menor

== Group 14 – Extremadura ==
Quarterfinals
C6	Jerez	2
D1	Plasencia	0
C5	Diocesano (s)	1
D2	Miajadas	1

Semifinals
C3	Coria (s)	1
C6	Jerez	1
C4	Moralo	0
C5	Diocesano	1

Final
C3	Coria (a.e.t.)	3
C5	Diocesano	1

- Promoted teams:
  - Promotion group: Cacereño and Montijo
  - Play-off: Coria

== Group 15 – Navarre ==
Quarterfinals
C5	Atlético Cirbonero	2
D2	Huarte (a.e.t.)	3
C6	Valle de Egüés	1
D1	Pamplona	2

Semifinals
C3	Beti Kozkor (s)	1
D2	Huarte	1
C4	Ardoi	2
D1	Pamplona	1

Final
C3	Beti Kozkor	0
C4	Ardoi	2

- Promoted teams:
  - Promotion group: Peña Sport and San Juan
  - Play-off: Ardoi

== Group 16 – La Rioja ==
Quarter-finals
C6	Varea	2
D1	Calahorra B	1
C5	Anguiano (s)	0
D2	Arnedo	0

Semi-finals
C3	Alfaro	2
C6	Varea	0
C4	UD Logroñés B	1
C5	Anguiano	0

Final
C3	Alfaro	1
C4	UD Logroñés B (a.e.t.)	2

- Promoted teams:
  - Promotion group: Racing Rioja and Náxara
  - Play-off: UD Logroñés B

== Group 17 – Aragon ==
Quarter-finals
C5	Belchite 97	0
D2	Binéfar	1
C6	Utebo (s)	1
D1	Barbastro	1

Semi-finals
C3	Huesca B	3
D2	Binéfar	2
C4	Cuarte (s)	2
C6	Utebo	2

Final
C3	Huesca B (a.e.t.)	2
C4	Cuarte	1

- Promoted teams:
  - Promotion group: Teruel and Brea
  - Play-off: Huesca B

== Group 18 – Castilla–La Mancha ==
Quarter-finals
C6	Torrijos	3
D1	Guadalajara	0
C5	Quintanar del Rey	2
D2	Tarancón	1

Semi-finals
C3	Toledo (s)	1
C6	Torrijos	1
C4	Atlético Albacete	0
C5	Quintanar del Rey	1

Final
C3	Toledo	1
C5	Quintanar del Rey	0

- Promoted teams:
  - Promotion group: Marchamalo and Calvo Sotelo
  - Play-off: Toledo

== Promoted teams ==
- The 36 teams that were promoted through promotion groups are included.
- The numbers of years after the last promotion are referred to the last participation of the club in Segunda División B, the division that was partially replaced by the Segunda División RFEF.

Promoted to Segunda División RFEF
Águilas (First time ever)	Alzira (10 years later)	Andratx (First time ever)	Antequera (12 years later)	Ardoi (First time ever)	Arenteiro (32 years later)	Arosa (27 years later)	Atlético Mancha Real (4 years later)	Atlético Pulpileño (First time ever)
Avilés (6 years later)	Bergantiños (32 years later)	Brea (First time ever)	Burgos Promesas (First time ever)	Cacereño (5 years later)	Calvo Sotelo (First time ever)	Cayón (First time ever)	Ceares (First time ever)	Cerdanyola del Vallès (First time ever)
Ceuta (First time ever)	Coria (First time ever)	Cristo Atlético (First time ever)	Eldense (4 years later)	Europa (26 years later)	Formentera (3 years later)	Gernika (2 years later)	Gimástica Segoviana (3 years later)	Huesca B (First time ever)
Ibiza Islas Pitiusas (First time ever)	Intercity (First time ever)	Leganés B (23 years later)	Llanera (First time ever)	UD Logroñés B (First time ever)	Mar Menor (First time ever)	Marchamalo (First time ever)	Mensajero (4 years later)	Montijo (First time ever)
Móstoles URJC (First time ever)	Náxara (First time ever)	Panadería Pulido (First time ever)	Peña Sport (3 years later)	Racing Rioja (First time ever)	Rayo Cantabria (8 years later)	Real Sociedad C (First time ever)	San Fernando (First time ever)	San Juan (First time ever)
San Roque de Lepe (5 years later)	Sestao River (4 years later)	Terrassa (11 years later)	Teruel (2 years later)	Toledo (3 years later)	Tropezón (6 years later)	Unión Adarve (2 years later)	Vélez (24 years later)	Xerez Deportivo (First time ever)

== See also ==
- 2021 Segunda División play-offs
- 2021 Segunda División B play-offs
