= Casado (surname) =

Casado is a Spanish surname meaning married. People with this name include:

- Alberto Casado Cerviño (born 1952), Director General of the Spanish Patent and Trademark Office
- Antonio Casado Ruiz (born 1961), Spanish footballer
- Arturo Casado (born 1983), Spanish middle-distance runner
- Carlos Casado del Alisal (1833–99), Spanish Argentine businessman
- Coral Casado Ortiz (born 1996), Spanish professional racing cyclist
- Desiree Casado (born 1985), actress known for the role of Gabriela Rodriguez on Sesame Street
- Elizabeth Casado (born 1965), Puerto Rican politician
- Gloria Casado (born 1963), Spanish swimmer
- Israel Casado, Dominican arranger, music coordinator, piano player, musical director, and producer
- Iván Casado Ortiz (born 1993), Spanish footballer
- John Casado (born 1944), American graphic designer, artist and photographer
- Jorge Casado (born 1989), Spanish professional footballer
- José Casado (born 1988), Spanish footballer
- José Casado del Alisal (c. 1831–86), Spanish portrait and history painter
- José Manuel Casado (born 1986), Spanish professional footballer
- Juan Casado (born 1980), Argentine footballer
- Pablo Casado (born in 1981), Spanish politician and leader of the People's Party
- Pedro Casado (1937–2021), Spanish footballer
- Philippe Casado (1964–1995), French professional road bicycle racer
- Segismundo Casado (1893–1968), Spanish Army officer

== See also ==
- Casados, related surname
