= Tito Malagón =

Spanish footballer

Personal information
- Full name: Alberto Malagón Amate
- Date of birth: 2 July 1988 (age 38)
- Place of birth: Madrid, Spain
- Height: 1.71 m (5 ft 7 1/2 in)
- Position: Midfielder

Team information
- Current team: Las Rozas
- Number: 11

Youth career
- Alcalá

Senior career*
Years	Team	Apps	(Gls)
2007–2008	Alcalá	22	(4)
2008–2011	Rayo B	35	(1)
2009–2010	→ Alcala (loan)	17	(0)
2011–2012	Gandia	28	(3)
2012–2013	Carabanchel	12	(3)
2013	Admira Wacker	9	(1)
2013–2014	Alcalá	19	(1)
2014–2015	Marino	7	(0)
2015	Hradec Králové	7	(0)
2015–2016	Fuenlabrada	24	(2)
2016–2017	Inter de Madrid	11	(0)
2017	Olot	12	(2)
2017–2019	Ontinyent	52	(7)
2019–2020	Linense	13	(0)
2020	Orihuela	1	(0)
2020–2021	La Nucía	1	(0)
2021–	Las Rozas	3	(0)
- * Club domestic league appearances and goals as of 14 March 2021

Alberto "Tito" Malagón Amate (born 2 July 1988), is a Spanish footballer who play for Las Rozas CF as a midfielder.

== Career ==
On 28 March 2019, after the club's dissolution, Tito left Ontinyent.
