= Gaëtan Arib =

French footballer (born 1999)

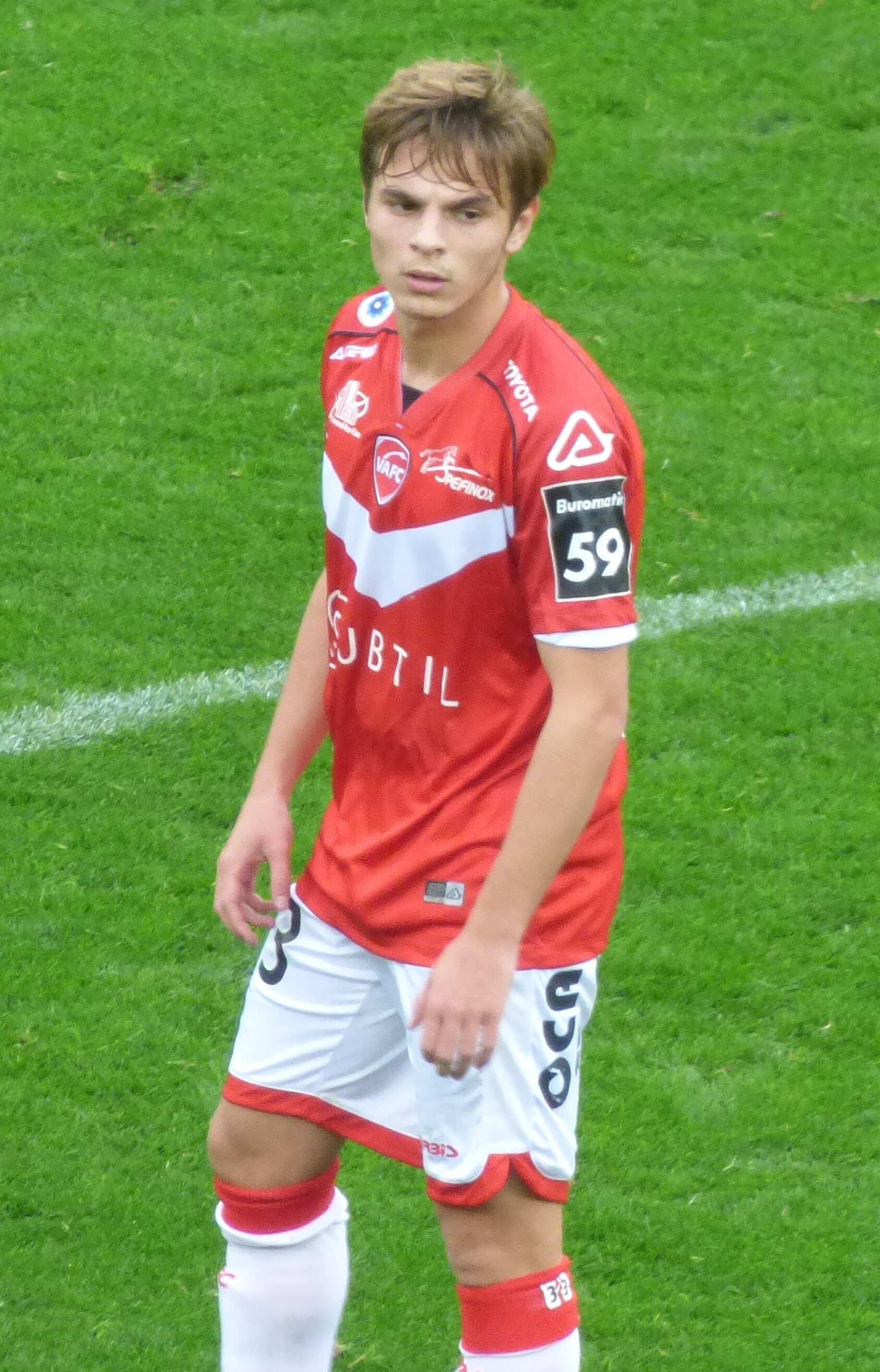
- Arib in 2018

Personal information
- Date of birth: 2 November 1999 (age 27)
- Place of birth: Saint-Saulve, France
- Height: 1.68 m (5 ft 6 in)
- Position: Midfielder

Team information
- Current team: Virton
- Number: 8

Youth career
- 2003–2006: Raismes 72
- 2006–2018: Valenciennes

Senior career*
Years	Team	Apps	(Gls)
2016–2022	Valenciennes B	18	(0)
2018–2022	Valenciennes	12	(0)
2020–2021	→ Las Rozas (loan)	11	(0)
2023	Francs Borains	15	(0)
2023–	Virton	35	(3)
- * Club domestic league appearances and goals as of 4 February 2026

Gaëtan Arib (born 2 November 1999) is a French footballer who plays as a midfielder for Belgian club Virton.

== Professional career ==
Arib made his professional debut with Valenciennes FC in a 4–0 Ligue 2 loss to Clermont Foot on 31 August 2018.

On 19 July 2023, Arib joined Virton in the Belgian third-tier Belgian National Division 1.

== Personal life ==
Born in France, Arib is of Algerian descent.
