= Mario Martos =

Spanish footballer

Personal information
- Full name: Mario Martos Serrano
- Date of birth: 14 November 1991 (age 34)
- Place of birth: Jaén, Spain
- Height: 1.75 m (5 ft 9 in)
- Position: Forward

Team information
- Current team: Real Jaén
- Number: 11

Youth career
- 2007–2009: Real Jaén

Senior career*
| Years | Team | Apps | (Gls) |
| 2009–2012 | Jaén B | 77 | (38) |
| 2012–2015 | Real Jaén | 49 | (5) |
| 2014 | → Almería B (loan) | 17 | (2) |
| 2015 | Almería B | 14 | (2) |
| 2015–2016 | Olympiakos Nicosia | 25 | (7) |
| 2016–2017 | Linares | 33 | (3) |
| 2017–2018 | OFI | 3 | (1) |
| 2018–2019 | Real Jaén | 34 | (9) |
| 2019–2020 | Algeciras | 22 | (2) |
| 2020–2022 | Torredonjimeno | 52 | (11) |
| 2022– | Real Jaén | 109 | (26) |
- * Club domestic league appearances and goals as of 7 May 2026

Mario Martos Serrano (born 14 November 1991) is a Spanish footballer who plays as a forward for Real Jaén.

== Club career ==
Born in Jaén, Andalusia, Martos played youth football with local Real Jaén, and made his senior debuts in with the B-team in the regional leagues. His first competitive appearance with the main squad occurred in the dying stages of the 2011–12 season, in Segunda División B; on 13 July 2012, he renewed his contract for one year after rejecting an offer from Granada CF.

In his second season with the Whites, Martos scored three goals in 32 matches, achieving promotion to Segunda División via the play-offs. He also started in a 0–1 away loss against Atlético Madrid in the Copa del Rey, on 28 November 2012.

On 2 August 2013, Martos signed a new two-year deal with Jaén after rejecting offers from Getafe CF and Recreativo de Huelva. He made his professional debut on 16 October, playing the last 29 minutes in a 2–0 home win over Deportivo de La Coruña in the domestic cup. He first appeared in the second level 30 days later, coming on as a late substitute in a 3–0 success against Real Zaragoza also at the Nuevo Estadio de La Victoria.

On 2 January 2014, Martos was loaned to UD Almería B until June. He rejoined Jaén in June but, after severing ties on 30 January 2015, returned to his previous club hours later.

In August 2015, Martos signed for Cypriot Second Division side Olympiakos Nicosia.
