= Carlos Indiano =

Spanish footballer

Personal information
- Full name: Carlos Indiano de Marcos
- Date of birth: 14 September 1988 (age 38)
- Place of birth: Madrid, Spain
- Height: 1.76 m (5 ft 9 in)
- Position: Midfielder

Team information
- Current team: Las Rozas
- Number: 21

Youth career
- Atlético Madrid

Senior career*
Years	Team	Apps	(Gls)
2007–2008	Atlético Madrid C	29	(6)
2008–2010	Atlético Madrid B	41	(5)
2010–2012	Alavés	67	(3)
2012–2013	Cádiz	17	(1)
2013–2015	Albacete	38	(3)
2015	Hércules	13	(0)
2016	Cartagena	9	(0)
2016–2017	Lleida Esportiu	14	(0)
2017	Badalona	11	(1)
2017–2018	Marbella	29	(2)
2018–2019	Salamanca	17	(2)
2019–2020	Burgos	21	(0)
2020–	Las Rozas	0	(0)
- * Club domestic league appearances and goals as of 8 March 2020

Carlos Indiano de Marcos (born 14 September 1988) is a Spanish footballer who plays for Las Rozas CF as a midfielder.

== Club career ==
Born in Madrid, Indiano graduated with Atlético Madrid's youth setup, and made his debuts as a senior with the C-team in the 2007–08 campaign, in Tercera División. In the summer of 2008, he was promoted to the reserves in Segunda División B.

Indiano continued to appear in the third level in the following seasons, representing Deportivo Alavés, Cádiz CF and Albacete Balompié. With the latter he appeared in 36 matches during the 2013–14 season, which ended in promotion.

On 6 September 2014 Indiano played his first match as a professional, replacing Portu in the 74th minute of a 1–1 home draw against Sporting de Gijón in the Segunda División championship. On 13 January of the following year, after appearing sparingly, he moved to third level's Hércules CF.

== Career statistics ==
As of 15 November 2017

Club	Season	League			Cup		Other		Total	
Club	Season	Division	Apps	Goals	Apps	Goals	Apps	Goals	Apps	Goals
Atlético Madrid B	2008–09	Segunda División B	7	0	—		—		7	0
Atlético Madrid B	2009–10	Segunda División B	34	5	—		—		34	5
Atlético Madrid B	Total		41	5	—		—		41	5
Alavés	2010–11	Segunda División B	31	1	0	0	4 (Note: Appearances in Promotion Play-offs)	0	35	1
Alavés	2011–12	Segunda División B	36	2	1	0	—		37	2
Alavés	Total		67	3	1	0	4	0	72	3
Cádiz	2012–13	Segunda División B	17	1	2	0	—		19	1
Albacete	2013–14	Segunda División B	32	3	1	0	4	1	37	4
Albacete	2014–15	Segunda División	6	0	3	0	—		9	0
Albacete	Total		38	3	4	0	4	1	46	4
Hércules	2014–15	Segunda División B	5	0	0	0	—		5	0
Hércules	2015–16	Segunda División B	8	0	1	0	—		9	0
Hércules	Total		13	0	1	0	—		14	0
Cartagena	2015–16	Segunda División B	9	0	0	0	—		9	0
Lleida	2016–17	Segunda División B	14	0	1	0	—		15	0
Badalona	2016–17	Segunda División B	11	1	0	0	—		11	1
Marbella	2017–18	Segunda División B	14	0	2	0	—		16	0
Career total			224	13	11	0	8	1	243	14
