= 2019–20 Segunda División B =

Spanish association football season

Segunda División B
- Season: 2019–20
- Promoted: Logroñés; Cartagena; Castellón; Sabadell
- Biggest home win: Internacional 6–0 Las Palmas Atlético (17 November 2019); Sporting Gijón B 6–0 Peña Deportiva (15 December 2019)
- Biggest away win: Barakaldo 0–5 Real Sociedad B (29 September 2019); Yeclano 0–5 San Fernando (9 February 2020)
- Highest scoring: Izarra 2–6 Unionistas (21 December 2019)

The 2019–20 Segunda División B season was the 43rd since its establishment. Eighty teams participated, distributed in four groups of twenty clubs each. On 11 March 2020, the season of Segunda División B was suspended due to the coronavirus COVID-19 pandemic in Spain.

On 6 May 2020, the Royal Spanish Football Federation announced the premature end of the league, revoking all relegations and planning an eventual promotion playoff to be played if possible. Also, the expansion of the league to five groups of 20 teams each for the 2020–21 season (due to promotion from the curtailed Tercera División groups being applied) was approved.

== Overview before the season ==
80 teams joined the league, including four relegated from the 2018–19 Segunda División and 18 promoted from the 2018–19 Tercera División. The final groups were drawn in July 2019.

Relegated from Segunda División

- Córdoba
- Gimnàstic
- Rayo Majadahonda
- ~~Reus~~ (excluded due to its financial trouble)

Promoted from Tercera División

- Alavés B
- Algeciras
- Cádiz B
- Getafe B
- Haro
- La Nucía
- Las Rozas
- Llagostera
- Marino Luanco
- Mérida
- Orihuela
- Osasuna B
- Peña Deportiva
- Prat
- Racing Ferrol
- Villarrobledo
- Villarrubia
- Yeclano

Bought vacant places

- Andorra

== Group 1 ==
Location of teams in 2019–20 Segunda División B – Group 1
Location of Community of Madrid teams in 2019–20 Segunda División B – Group 1
Location of teams in 2019–20 Segunda División B – Group 1 (Canary Islands)

=== Teams and locations ===
Team	Home city	Stadium	Capacity
Atlético Baleares	Palma	Estadi Balear	6,000
Atlético Madrid B	Madrid	Cerro del Espino	3,800
Celta Vigo B	Vigo	Barreiro	4,500
Coruxo	Vigo	O Vao	2,200
Getafe B	Getafe	Ciudad Deportiva	1,500
Ibiza	Ibiza	Can Misses	5,000
Internacional	Boadilla del Monte	Polideportivo Municipal	1,200
Langreo	Langreo	Ganzábal	4,024
Las Palmas Atlético	Las Palmas	Anexo Gran Canaria	2,000
Las Rozas	Las Rozas	Navalcarbón	3,000
Marino Luanco	Luanco	Miramar	3,500
Melilla	Melilla	Álvarez Claro	10,000
Oviedo B	Oviedo	El Requexón	3,000
Peña Deportiva	Santa Eulària des Riu	Municipal	1,500
Pontevedra	Pontevedra	Pasarón	12,000
Racing Ferrol	Ferrol	A Malata	12,043
Rayo Majadahonda	Majadahonda	Cerro del Espino	3,800
Real Madrid Castilla	Madrid	Alfredo di Stéfano	6,000
San Sebastián de los Reyes	San Sebastián de los Reyes	Matapiñonera	3,000
Sporting Gijón B	Gijón	Pepe Ortiz	3,000

=== League table ===
Pos	Team	Pld	W	D	L	GF	GA	GD	Pts	Qualification or relegation
1	Atlético Baleares	28	18	4	6	44	22	+22	58	Qualification for the group champions' playoffs and Copa del Rey
2	Ibiza	28	17	5	6	41	18	+23	56	Qualification for the promotion playoffs and Copa del Rey
3	Atlético Madrid B	28	16	5	7	52	27	+25	53	Qualification for the promotion playoffs
4	Peña Deportiva	28	13	6	9	43	41	+2	45	Qualification for the promotion playoffs and Copa del Rey
5	Coruxo	28	11	8	9	32	30	+2	41	Qualification for the Copa del Rey
6	Rayo Majadahonda	28	11	8	9	31	29	+2	41	Qualification for the Copa del Rey
7	Real Madrid Castilla	28	10	10	8	42	35	+7	40	
8	Internacional	28	10	10	8	39	37	+2	40	Qualification for the Copa del Rey
9	Pontevedra	28	11	5	12	38	40	−2	38	Qualification for the Copa del Rey
10	Langreo	28	10	8	10	28	33	−5	38	Qualification for the Copa Federación national phase
11	Racing Ferrol	28	10	7	11	33	33	0	37 (Note: Racing Ferrol is ahead of Oviedo B on head-to-head points: Oviedo B–Racing Ferrol 0–1, Racing Ferrol–Oviedo B 2–0)	Qualification for the Copa Federación national phase
12	Oviedo B	28	10	7	11	31	38	−7	37	
13	Melilla	28	9	9	10	29	37	−8	36	Qualification for the Copa Federación national phase
14	Celta Vigo B	28	10	5	13	41	45	−4	35	
15	Sporting Gijón B	28	10	4	14	36	31	+5	34	
16	Las Palmas Atlético	28	10	4	14	20	35	−15	34	
17	Las Rozas	28	7	12	9	32	29	+3	33	Qualification for the Copa Federación national phase
18	Marino Luanco	28	9	5	14	26	37	−11	32	
19	Getafe B	28	8	4	16	25	37	−12	28	
20	San Sebastián de los Reyes	28	5	4	19	24	53	−29	19	

Source: BDFútbol
Rules for classification: 1) points; 2) head-to-head points; 3) head-to-head goal difference; 4) goal difference; 5) number of goals scored

=== Results ===
Home \ Away	ATB	ATM	CEL	COR	GET	IBI	INT	LAN	LPA	ROZ	MAR	MEL	OVI	PDE	PON	RFE	MAJ	RMC	SSR	SPO
Atlético Baleares	—		6–1	2–0		0–2	4–1	3–1	1–0	2–0			3–1	2–1	3–1	1–0	1–0	1–1	3–2	2–0
Atlético Madrid B	0–0	—	3–1	3–0			2–0	4–0	4–0	1–1	3–0			1–3	1–1	2–2	0–1	2–0	4–0	3–2
Celta Vigo B			—			1–0	5–0	0–1	1–0	2–4	0–2	4–2	3–1	3–1	1–2	0–2	0–1	0–1	2–1	
Coruxo	1–1	3–0	2–2	—		0–0	0–2		4–1	0–0			1–0	2–0	0–0	2–0		1–1	2–0	3–1
Getafe B	1–0	0–2	2–1	2–0	—			0–2	0–1	0–0	1–2	2–0		0–1	2–3		3–0		0–2	0–1
Ibiza	0–1	1–2		2–0	1–0	—	2–0	2–2	1–0		3–1	3–1			2–1	2–0	2–0		2–0	1–0
Internacional			2–2	0–2	2–1	2–1	—	3–0	6–0	2–1	1–0	5–1		1–1		1–0	1–2		3–3	1–1
Langreo	0–1	1–2	2–1	3–2	0–0			—	1–0	1–0	1–1	0–1	2–0					1–1	3–0	1–1
Las Palmas Atlético	2–1	1–0	0–0		0–1	3–2			—	1–0		1–0	1–2	3–0	1–2	1–0	0–0	0–0		
Las Rozas			3–0		1–1	1–1	3–0	0–0	2–0	—	1–0	0–1	1–0	1–1	1–3	2–5	1–1	1–1		
Marino Luanco	3–0	1–2	1–1	1–3	2–3		0–0	1–2	1–0	0–0	—	0–0		1–0					2–0	1–0
Melilla	0–0	0–1	1–0	1–1	1–0		1–1	2–0	0–1	0–0	2–1	—		2–2			0–3		1–0	2–0
Oviedo B		3–2		1–0	2–1	1–1	0–0	2–1	0–0		1–0	1–1	—	1–3	0–1	0–1	2–2		1–1	3–2
Peña Deportiva		3–1	3–4		2–0	0–2	0–0	3–1		2–1	4–0	2–1	4–3	—	1–0	1–1	0–0	2–0		
Pontevedra	0–1	1–5		2–0	2–3	0–0	1–2	0–0			3–0	3–1	0–1		—		2–1	4–0		2–1
Racing Ferrol	0–3	1–1		0–1	3–1	1–0	1–1	3–0			1–2	3–3	2–0		4–1	—	0–3		0–2	0–0
Rayo Majadahonda	2–1	1–0	1–2	1–1	2–0	0–1		0–2			2–1	2–2	1–1				—	2–2	1–0	1–0
Real Madrid Castilla				4–0	3–0	1–2	2–2	0–0	3–1	2–2	3–1	1–2	2–0	3–1	2–1	1–2	3–1	—	2–0	
San Sebastián de los Reyes	0–1	0–1	0–3		1–1	0–3			1–2	4–0			2–3	1–2	4–1	2–0		1–1	—	
Sporting Gijón B	2–0		1–1	0–1		0–2	1–0		2–0	2–1			0–1	6–0	3–1	0–1	1–0	4–2	5–0	—

Source: BDFútbol
Legend: Blue = home team win; Yellow = draw; Red = away team win.

=== Top goalscorers ===
As of 8 March 2020

Rank	Player	Team	Goals
1	(Spain) Rufo Sánchez	Internacional; Pontevedra	18
2	(Spain) Antonio Gabarre	Atlético Baleares	15
3	(Spain) Joselu Gómez	Racing Ferrol	14
4	(Spain) Ángel Rodado	Ibiza	13
4	(Spain) Davo Álvarez	Langreo	13

=== Top goalkeepers ===
As of 8 March 2020

Rank	Name	Club	Goals against	Matches	Average
1	(Spain) Alberto Domínguez	Coruxo	30	28	1.07

== Group 2 ==
Location of teams in 2019–20 Segunda División B – Group 2
Location of Basque Country teams in 2019–20 Segunda División B – Group 2

=== Teams and locations ===
Team	Home city	Stadium	Capacity
Alavés B	Vitoria-Gasteiz	Ibaia	2,500
Amorebieta	Amorebieta-Etxano	Urritxe	3,000
Arenas	Getxo	Gobela	2,000
Athletic Bilbao B	Bilbao	Lezama	3,250
Barakaldo	Barakaldo	Lasesarre	7,960
Burgos	Burgos	El Plantío	12,194
Calahorra	Calahorra	La Planilla	4,500
Cultural Leonesa	León	Reino de León	13,346
Guijuelo	Guijuelo	Municipal	1,500
Haro Deportivo	Haro	El Mazo	4,300
Izarra	Estella-Lizarra	Merkatondoa	3,500
Leioa	Leioa	Sarriena	2,000
Osasuna B	Pamplona	Tajonar	4,500
Real Sociedad B	San Sebastián	José Luis Orbegozo	2,500
Real Unión	Irun	Stadium Gal	5,000
Salamanca	Salamanca	Helmántico	17,341
Tudelano	Tudela	Ciudad de Tudela	11,000
UD Logroñés	Logroño	Las Gaunas	16,000
Unionistas	Salamanca	Pistas del Helmántico	3,000
Valladolid Promesas	Valladolid	Anexos José Zorrilla	1,500

=== League table ===
Pos	Team	Pld	W	D	L	GF	GA	GD	Pts	Qualification or relegation
1	UD Logroñés (O, P)	28	18	8	2	48	18	+30	62	Qualification for the group champions' playoffs and Copa del Rey
2	Cultural Leonesa	28	14	7	7	45	28	+17	49 (Note: Cultural Leonesa is ahead of Athletic Bilbao B on head-to-head goal difference: Cultural Leonesa–Athletic Bilbao B 5–2, Athletic Bilbao B–Cultural Leonesa 1–0)	Qualification for the promotion playoffs and Copa del Rey
3	Athletic Bilbao B	28	14	7	7	55	35	+20	49	Qualification for the promotion playoffs
4	Valladolid Promesas	28	12	11	5	43	28	+15	47	Qualification for the promotion playoffs
5	Real Sociedad B	28	12	8	8	47	35	+12	44	
6	Amorebieta	28	11	9	8	38	38	0	42	Qualification for the Copa del Rey
7	Osasuna B	28	11	7	10	35	35	0	40	
8	Burgos	28	10	9	9	31	37	−6	39	Qualification for the Copa del Rey
9	Guijuelo	28	10	7	11	30	26	+4	37	Qualification for the Copa del Rey
10	Haro Deportivo	28	9	9	10	29	33	−4	36	Qualification for the Copa del Rey
11	Alavés B	28	8	10	10	28	31	−3	34	
12	Calahorra	28	6	16	6	28	32	−4	34	Qualification for the Copa del Rey
13	Salamanca	28	9	7	12	30	39	−9	34	Qualification for the Copa Federación national phase
14	Barakaldo	28	9	5	14	33	42	−9	32	Qualification for the Copa Federación national phase
15	Leioa	28	7	10	11	35	38	−3	31	Qualification for the Copa Federación national phase
16	Unionistas	28	8	7	13	39	43	−4	31	
17	Real Unión	28	6	11	11	29	33	−4	29	
18	Arenas	28	6	10	12	27	43	−16	28	
19	Izarra	28	6	10	12	29	47	−18	28	
20	Tudelano	28	4	12	12	26	44	−18	24	

Source: BDFútbol
Rules for classification: 1) points; 2) head-to-head points; 3) head-to-head goal difference; 4) goal difference; 5) number of goals scored
(O) Play-off winners; (P) Promoted

=== Results ===
Home \ Away	ALA	AMO	ARE	ATH	BAR	BUR	CAL	CUL	GUI	HAR	IZA	LEI	OSA	RSO	RUN	SAL	TUD	LOG	UNS	VAD
Alavés B	—		0–2		1–0	2–2		1–1	2–0	2–0	4–0	0–0		3–2	1–0		1–0	1–1	2–1	1–1
Amorebieta	1–1	—	0–0	2–1	3–2		1–0	1–3			0–0		1–0		1–4	2–3	5–1	0–1	1–3	1–0
Arenas		1–1	—	1–2		0–2		1–2	0–0	2–0		0–3	0–2	1–0	0–0	2–1	1–1	1–2		0–3
Athletic Bilbao B	1–0	3–3	1–1	—	2–1		0–0	1–0		2–3	3–3	3–1	5–0		3–3	4–0	1–0		4–1	4–1
Barakaldo	1–1		1–3		—		1–1	0–0		2–1	1–2	1–2		0–5	2–1		3–1	0–1	2–1	3–1
Burgos	1–1	1–2	2–2	2–0	1–0	—	0–1	2–0		1–1	1–1		3–2	0–2		1–0	3–0		0–3	0–1
Calahorra	1–1		2–1		3–3	3–0	—	1–0	1–2		1–0	0–0			2–0		1–1	1–1	1–1	
Cultural Leonesa		1–1		5–2		4–0		—	3–1	2–0	1–1	2–0	0–0	3–0		3–1		0–2	1–0	
Guijuelo	1–0	0–1		2–0	1–2	3–0	0–0	3–1	—	2–0	3–0	0–0	1–2	3–0		1–2	0–0			
Haro		1–1		1–4	0–0	1–1	1–1		1–0	—	3–1	0–0	1–0	2–0		1–2			1–0	
Izarra	0–0		3–1		1–0		1–1	0–1		0–2	—	2–0		1–1	0–1	1–1	1–0	2–2	2–6	2–2
Leioa	2–0	0–1		1–0	1–3	5–0	3–3	2–4	0–1	2–2	3–1	—	0–0	0–2		2–1				1–1
Osasuna B	3–1	3–2	4–1	1–1	1–0	0–0	3–0				1–0		—		4–2	1–1	1–1	0–1	2–0	1–0
Real Sociedad B	3–0	4–2		0–2	2–4	1–1	2–0		2–0	1–1	3–1	4–3	3–1	—		3–1			0–0	1–1
Real Unión		0–1	1–1	0–1		0–1	0–0	1–1	2–1	1–0		0–0	1–1	2–2	—	0–1	1–2			2–1
Salamanca	1–1		3–1	1–1	3–0	0–1	1–2		0–0		1–1				1–1	—	2–1	0–2	2–0	
Tudelano		0–0	1–1	0–3		2–2		2–3	1–1	1–2		2–1	2–1	0–0	2–2		—	0–1	3–1	1–1
UD Logroñés	0–0	1–1	4–0			3–0	0–0	3–2	2–0	0–1		4–1	2–1	0–0	3–2	1–0	4–0	—		1–1
Unionistas	4–2		1–2		1–0		2–2	1–2	2–1	2–1		1–1	4–0	1–3	0–2	1–1	1–1	1–4	—	0–0
Valladolid Promesas	1–0	4–0	1–1				1–1	1–0	2–2	1–1	4–1	3–2	2–0	2–1	1–0	3–0				—

Source: BDFútbol
Legend: Blue = home team win; Yellow = draw; Red = away team win.

=== Top goalscorers ===
As of 8 March 2020

Rank	Player	Club	Goals
1	(Spain) Miguel de la Fuente	Valladolid Promesas	14
2	(Spain) Dioni	Cultural Leonesa	11
2	(Spain) Pablo Espina	Guijuelo	11
4	3 players		10

=== Top goalkeepers ===
As of 8 March 2020

Rank	Name	Club	Goals against	Matches	Average
1	(Spain) Leandro Montagud	Cultural Leonesa	28	28	1
2	(Spain) Mikel Saizar	Amorebieta	38	28	1.36

== Group 3 ==
Location of teams in 2019–20 Segunda División B – Group 3
2019–20 Segunda División B (Province of Barcelona)

=== Teams and locations ===
Team	Home city	Stadium	Capacity
Andorra	Encamp, Andorra	Prada de Molès	550
Atlético Levante	Valencia	Bunyol	3,000
Badalona	Badalona	Municipal	4,170
Barcelona B	Sant Joan Despí	Johan Cruyff	6,000
Castellón	Castellón de la Plana	Castalia	14,485
Cornellà	Cornellà de Llobregat	Nou Camp Municipal	1,500
Ebro	Zaragoza	El Carmen	3,000
Ejea	Ejea de los Caballeros	Luchán	1,200
Espanyol B	Sant Adrià de Besòs	Dani Jarque	1,520
Gimnàstic	Tarragona	Nou Estadi	14,591
Hércules	Alicante	José Rico Pérez	30,000
La Nucía	La Nucía	Camilo Cano	3,000
Llagostera	Llagostera	Municipal	1,500
Lleida Esportiu	Lleida	Camp d'Esports	13,500
Olot	Olot	Municipal	5,000
Orihuela	Orihuela	Los Arcos	5,000
Prat	El Prat de Llobregat	Sagnier	1,500
Sabadell	Sabadell	Nova Creu Alta	11,981
Valencia Mestalla	Valencia	Antonio Puchades	3,000
Villarreal B	Villarreal	Ciudad Deportiva	4,200

=== League table ===
Pos	Team	Pld	W	D	L	GF	GA	GD	Pts	Qualification or relegation
1	Castellón (P)	28	14	8	6	40	24	+16	50	Qualification for the group champions' playoffs and Copa del Rey
2	Barcelona B	28	13	10	5	40	27	+13	49	Qualification for the promotion playoffs
3	Sabadell (P)	28	14	7	7	38	25	+13	49	Qualification for the promotion playoffs and Copa del Rey
4	Cornellà	28	13	10	5	34	25	+9	49	Qualification for the promotion playoffs and Copa del Rey
5	Lleida Esportiu	28	12	10	6	34	22	+12	46 (Note: Lleida Esportiu is ahead of Villarreal B on head-to-head points: Villarreal B–Lleida Esportiu 1–3, Lleida Esportiu–Villarreal B 3–0)	Qualification for the Copa del Rey
6	Villarreal B	28	13	7	8	36	32	+4	46	
7	Olot	28	11	11	6	34	19	+15	44	Qualification for the Copa del Rey
8	Espanyol B	28	11	9	8	44	37	+7	42	
9	Andorra	28	10	11	7	31	28	+3	41	Qualification for the Copa del Rey
10	La Nucía	28	10	9	9	30	29	+1	39	Qualification for the Copa del Rey
11	Ebro	28	8	13	7	29	31	−2	37	Qualification for the Copa Federación national phase
12	Atlético Levante	28	10	5	13	29	34	−5	35	
13	Llagostera	28	7	12	9	28	33	−5	33	Qualification for the Copa Federación national phase
14	Gimnàstic	28	7	10	11	33	38	−5	31	Qualification for the Copa Federación national phase
15	Ejea	28	6	9	13	27	36	−9	27	
16	Valencia Mestalla	28	4	14	10	27	33	−6	26	
17	Prat	28	5	11	12	25	40	−15	26	
18	Hércules	28	5	10	13	27	35	−8	25	
19	Badalona	28	5	9	14	17	34	−17	24	
20	Orihuela	28	4	11	13	26	47	−21	23	

Source: BDFútbol
Rules for classification: 1) points; 2) head-to-head points; 3) head-to-head goal difference; 4) goal difference; 5) number of goals scored
(P) Promoted

=== Results ===
Home \ Away	AND	LEV	BAD	BAR	CAS	COR	EBR	EJE	ESP	GIM	HER	NUC	LLA	LLE	OLO	ORI	PRA	SAB	VAL	VIL
Andorra	—	0–1	2–0				2–1	3–0	0–3	0–0	2–1		1–1	1–0	1–0	2–1	1–2	2–2	4–3	0–0
Atlético Levante	1–1	—		1–2	0–2	3–1	1–2		0–2	1–0	1–0	3–1	1–0			1–1	2–0	1–2		1–1
Badalona		1–0	—	0–2	1–1	0–2	0–1			2–1		2–2		1–1	0–0	1–0	0–1		1–2	
Barcelona B	0–0	2–0	2–1	—	2–1	3–3		2–0	2–0	2–2	0–0	3–1	3–2			3–0	2–2	1–0		2–3
Castellón	3–1		3–1		—	3–1		1–1	1–0	3–2	1–0	3–0	0–0		1–0		1–3	0–1	2–2	3–0 (Note: Match awarded to Castellón due to illegal alignment of Villarreal B. The match initially ended 1–2.)
Cornellà	2–0	1–0	1–1			—		1–1	1–0	1–1	0–1	1–0	2–1	1–0	1–1		0–0	2–0	1–0	1–2
Ebro		3–1	2–1	1–1	2–1	1–1	—	1–1	0–0	0–2	0–0	2–1			1–2	2–0	1–1	1–1		2–1
Ejea	1–1	0–1	2–0	1–0	0–1	0–1	1–1	—						0–0	0–2	4–0	3–0		2–0	
Espanyol B	2–0		1–2		0–0	2–2	2–2	3–1	—		3–2	2–1	3–1	2–2	1–5			4–2	0–0	3–1
Gimnàstic	0–3			1–0	1–1	2–2	4–1	2–0	2–2	—	0–2	2–1	1–3	1–1					2–1	0–1
Hércules	0–0	1–3	1–2	4–1			3–0	2–2			—		0–0	1–1	0–0	1–3	2–2	0–2	1–1	1–2
La Nucía	1–1		1–1		1–1	1–0		2–1	2–0	2–0	3–0	—	0–0	2–1	2–1			1–0	0–0	0–0
Llagostera		1–3	0–0	1–1			2–1	2–2		0–0	2–1		—	1–0	1–0	1–1	1–1	0–1	1–1	0–3
Lleida Esportiu		0–0	3–0	1–1	1–0		0–0	2–0	2–1	1–0		0–2		—	1–1	4–0	2–0		2–1	3–0
Olot		3–0	2–0	1–0	1–0	1–1	1–0		1–1	2–1		4–0		0–1	—	0–1	0–0	1–1	1–0	
Orihuela	1–1	1–1		0–0	2–2	1–2		2–0	1–3	2–2	1–0	0–0	0–3			—	1–1	1–1		1–2
Prat	0–1			1–2	0–1	1–2	0–0		0–2	1–3	1–1	0–3	1–2	0–0		2–2	—			3–1
Sabadell			1–0		0–2			2–1	3–1	2–0	1–2	1–0	1–1	4–0	1–1	2–1	3–0	—	0–0	
Valencia Mestalla		3–1	0–0	0–0			0–0	1–1	1–1	1–1		0–0		1–2	2–2	4–1	1–2	0–3	—	
Villarreal B	2–1	2–1	0–0	0–1		0–0	1–1	3–1			1–0		4–1	1–3	1–1	2–1		2–0	0–1	—

First match(es) will be played: complete. Source:
Legend: Blue = home team win; Yellow = draw; Red = away team win.

=== Top goalscorers ===
As of 8 March 2020

Rank	Player	Club	Goals
1	(Spain) Álex Collado	Barcelona B	13
2	(Spain) César Díaz	Castellon	10
2	(Spain) Monchu	Barcelona B	10
4	4 players		9

=== Top goalkeepers ===
As of 8 March 2020

Rank	Name	Club	Goals against	Matches	Average
1	(Spain) Ian Mackay	Sabadell	25	28	0.89
2	(Spain) Óscar Fornés	La Nucía	29	28	1.04
3	(Spain) Marcos Pérez	Llagostera	33	28	1.18
4	(Spain) Ismael Falcón	Hércules	35	28	1.25
5	(Spain) Bernabé Barragán	Gimnàstic	38	28	1.36

== Group 4 ==
Location of teams in 2019–20 Segunda División B – Group 4

=== Teams and locations ===
Team	Home city	Stadium	Capacity
Algeciras	Algeciras	Nuevo Mirador	7,200
Atlético Sanluqueño	Sanlúcar de Barrameda	El Palmar	5,000
Badajoz	Badajoz	Nuevo Vivero	15,198
Cádiz B	Cádiz	Bahía de Cádiz	2,500
Cartagena	Cartagena	Cartagonova	15,105
Córdoba	Córdoba	El Arcángel	20,989
Don Benito	Don Benito	Vicente Sanz	3,500
Linense	La Línea de la Concepción	Municipal	12,000
Marbella	Marbella	Municipal	8,000
Mérida	Mérida	Romano	14,600
Murcia	Murcia	Nueva Condomina	31,179
Recreativo	Huelva	Nuevo Colombino	21,670
Recreativo Granada	Granada	Ciudad Deportiva	2,500
San Fernando	San Fernando	Iberoamericano	12,000
Sevilla Atlético	Seville	Jesús Navas	8,000
Talavera de la Reina	Talavera de la Reina	El Prado	6,000
UCAM Murcia	Murcia	La Condomina	6,000
Villarrobledo	Villarrobledo	Nuestra Señora de la Caridad	5,500
Villarrubia	Villarrubia de los Ojos	Nuevo Municipal	1,000
Yeclano	Yecla	La Constitución	5,000

=== League table ===
Pos	Team	Pld	W	D	L	GF	GA	GD	Pts	Qualification or relegation
1	Cartagena (O, P)	28	15	9	4	33	19	+14	54	Qualification for the group champions' playoffs and Copa del Rey
2	Marbella	28	13	14	1	39	20	+19	53	Qualification for the promotion playoffs and Copa del Rey
3	Badajoz	28	14	7	7	37	22	+15	49	Qualification for the promotion playoffs and Copa del Rey
4	Yeclano	28	13	8	7	42	33	+9	47	Qualification for the promotion playoffs and Copa del Rey
5	Córdoba	28	12	9	7	33	27	+6	45	Qualification for the Copa del Rey
6	San Fernando	28	12	8	8	39	25	+14	44	Qualification for the Copa del Rey
7	Linense	28	10	11	7	27	26	+1	41	Qualification for the Copa del Rey
8	Murcia	28	10	9	9	33	26	+7	39	Qualification for the Copa Federación national phase
9	Sevilla Atlético	28	9	9	10	31	33	−2	36	
10	UCAM Murcia	28	9	9	10	29	33	−4	36	Qualification for the Copa Federación national phase
11	Cádiz B	28	9	9	10	23	27	−4	36	
12	Villarrubia	28	8	11	9	34	33	+1	35	Qualification for the Copa Federación national phase
13	Recreativo	28	8	9	11	30	31	−1	33	Qualification for the Copa Federación national phase
14	Don Benito	28	8	8	12	32	35	−3	32	
15	Atlético Sanluqueño	28	7	9	12	20	28	−8	30	
16	Algeciras	28	6	11	11	31	40	−9	29	
17	Talavera de la Reina	28	7	8	13	23	33	−10	29	
18	Recreativo Granada	28	7	8	13	21	35	−14	29	
19	Mérida	28	4	15	9	28	37	−9	27	
20	Villarrobledo	28	5	7	16	23	45	−22	22	

Source: BDFútbol
Rules for classification: 1) points; 2) head-to-head points; 3) head-to-head goal difference; 4) goal difference; 5) number of goals scored
(O) Play-off winners; (P) Promoted

=== Results ===
Home \ Away	ALG	SLU	BAD	CAD	CAR	COR	DBE	LIN	MAR	MER	MUR	REC	GRA	SFE	SAT	TAL	UCM	VRO	VRU	YEC
Algeciras	—		1–0	1–1	1–1	2–2	2–0	2–0				0–0		1–1	3–0	0–3	1–2		0–0	3–2
Atlético Sanluqueño	2–1	—			0–1		0–0	1–0	1–2	3–0		1–1	0–2	0–0	1–2		2–1	1–0	1–2	0–2
Badajoz	2–1	0–0	—	0–0	2–1	0–1			1–0	1–1	0–0		4–0	1–2	1–0	2–0	2–1	3–2		
Cádiz B	2–2	0–0	0–2	—	1–1	1–1			0–1	2–1	2–1		1–0	1–0	1–2	0–0		1–0		2–0
Cartagena	2–0	2–0	0–0	1–0	—	2–0		3–2	0–0					0–0	0–1	2–2	2–1	2–1		2–2
Córdoba	0–1	3–1	1–0	1–0	0–2	—			1–2	1–1	1–0		2–1		2–1			2–0		2–1
Don Benito		1–1	1–4	1–1	1–2	0–1	—	2–2	1–1	1–2	2–1	2–1	3–0			1–0	1–3		5–0	
Linense		1–0	1–0	0–0	0–1	0–1	1–0	—	1–1	0–0	1–1	1–0	1–1			2–1	1–0	1–0		
Marbella	0–0	1–1			0–0		1–0	0–0	—	3–2		2–1		2–2	2–1	0–0	4–0	2–1	2–1	2–1
Mérida	4–2				0–1		1–1	1–1	0–0	—	1–0	0–1	1–1	1–1	0–0			0–0	1–3	2–2
Murcia	1–1	1–2		3–1	2–0	1–0	2–1		1–1	1–0	—		2–0	1–2	2–2	0–1	3–1	3–0		0–1
Recreativo		2–0	0–1	1–0	0–1	2–2	2–0	1–1	0–0	3–3	0–0	—	1–2	1–3		3–1	1–0	1–1		
Recreativo Granada	0–0	1–0			0–1	0–2	1–0	1–1	0–3	0–2			—	0–0	0–0	0–0	0–1	2–1	0–0	2–3
San Fernando	2–0		2–1	2–0			0–1	0–1			3–3	2–1		—	1–2	1–0	0–0		3–0	1–0
Sevilla Atlético	3–2			0–1	1–0	2–1	2–3	1–1				1–3		1–0	—	1–1	3–0	2–2	0–0	0–0
Talavera de la Reina		1–2	0–2	0–2		2–1			1–1	2–1	1–2	0–1	3–2		1–0	—		1–0	1–1	0–0
UCAM Murcia		0–0	1–0	0–0		1–1		4–3	2–2	0–0	0–0	1–0	2–1			2–0	—		0–0	3–1
Villarrobledo	1–1		1–3				2–1	0–2	1–4		0–0	2–1	0–2	0–4	3–2		2–1	—	2–1	1–1
Villarrubia	4–2	1–0	1–3	3–0	1–2	0–0	0–1	2–3		5–1	2–1	2–2		3–0		1–1	0–0	0–0	—	
Yeclano	4–1		3–0	2–1		2–2	1–1	3–0		2–2		2–0		0–5	1–0	2–0	2–1	1–0	1–0	—

Legend: Blue = home team win; Yellow = draw; Red = away team win.

=== Top goalscorers ===
As of 8 March 2020

Rank	Player	Club	Goals
1	(Spain) Francis Ferrón	San Fernando	13
2	(Spain) Gorka Santamaría	Badajoz	10
2	(Spain) Isaac Aketxe	UCAM Murcia	10
4	4 players		9

=== Top goalkeepers ===
As of 8 March 2020

Rank	Name	Club	Goals against	Matches	Average
1	(Spain) Marc Martínez	Cartagena	19	28	0.68
2	(Spain) Kike Royo	Badajoz	22	28	0.79
3	(Spain) Javier Montoya	Linense	26	28	0.93
4	(Spain) Ismael Gil	Atlético Sanluqueño	28	29	1
5	(Spain) Sebastián Gil	Don Benito	35	28	1.25

== Copa Federación qualification ==
14 teams qualified for the 2020 Copa Federación: the 3 best teams in each group (excluding reserves) that did not qualify for the Copa del Rey and the 2 best-placed teams overall from the rest of teams, ranked by their points.

=== Best-placed teams ===
As two teams could qualify, only the best two teams in each group are shown.

Pos	Grp	Team	Pld	W	D	L	GF	GA	GD	Pts	Qualification
1	1	Las Rozas	28	7	12	9	32	29	+3	33	Qualification for the Copa Federación national phase
2	4	Recreativo	28	8	9	11	30	31	−1	33	Qualification for the Copa Federación national phase
3	4	Don Benito	28	8	8	12	32	35	−3	32	
4	1	Marino Luanco	28	9	5	14	26	37	−11	32	
5	2	Unionistas	28	8	7	13	39	43	−4	31	
6	2	Real Unión	28	6	11	11	29	33	−4	29	
7	3	Ejea	28	6	9	13	27	36	−9	27	
8	3	Prat	28	5	11	12	25	40	−15	26	

Source: RFEF – Tournament rules: Copa Federación
Rules for classification: 1) number of points; 2) goal difference; 3) number of goals scored; 4) fair-play points; 5) playoff match

== Average attendances ==
This is a list of attendance data of the teams that give an official number. They include playoffs games:

Pos	Team	Total	High	Low	Average	Change
1	Córdoba	126,650	12,758	7,502	9,046	−12.0%^{1}
2	Murcia	88,017	11,075	3,000	5,868	−20.6%
3	Cultural Leonesa	76,367	10,436	4,335	5,874	−1.0%
4	UD Logroñés	59,713	6,874	2,624	3,981	+5.3%
5	Gimnàstic	44,104	4,431	2,359	3,393	−19.5%^{1}
6	Sabadell	42,659	4,434	2,149	3,047	+20.9%
7	Barcelona B	37,336	4,321	1,030	2,489	+78.2%
8	UCAM Murcia	27,881	5,490	1,361	2,145	+0.8%
9	Unionistas	30,316	3,580	1,327	2,021	+0.8%
10	Linense	17,316	1,650	1,142	1,332	n/a
11	Olot	15,002	1,697	646	1,072	−6.7%
12	Real Madrid Castilla	15,016	1,700	612	1,001	−10.9%
13	Badalona	12,307	2,264	650	947	+0.1%
14	Sevilla Atlético	12,659	1,646	500	904	n/a
15	Langreo	10,750	1,410	488	827	+0.5%

Notes:
1: Team played last season in Segunda División.
2: Team played last season in Tercera División.
