= Casados =

Casados is a Spanish surname either meaning married (plural) or from a homonymous farmstead.

Notable people with this surname include:

- Eloy Casados (1949–2016), American actor
- René Casados (born 1961), Mexican actor

== See also ==
- Casado (surname)
