= Carlos Parra (footballer, born 1996) =

Spanish footballer (born 1996)

Personal information
- Full name: Carlos Parra Aranzo
- Date of birth: 18 February 1996 (age 30)
- Place of birth: Madrid, Spain
- Height: 1.70 m (5 ft 7 in)
- Position: Right back

Team information
- Current team: Salamanca
- Number: 2

Youth career
- 2007–2014: Real Madrid
- 2014–2015: Rayo Majadahonda
- 2015: Atlético Madrid

Senior career*
Years	Team	Apps	(Gls)
2015	Rayo Majadahonda	1	(0)
2015–2016	Toledo B	26	(1)
2016–2017	Alcobendas	18	(0)
2017–2019	Alcorcón B	57	(0)
2019	Alcorcón	1	(0)
2019–2022	Zamora	71	(0)
2022–2023	Talavera	26	(0)
2023–2024	Zamora	30	(0)
2024–2025	Móstoles URJC	16	(0)
2025–	Salamanca	40	(2)
- * Club domestic league appearances and goals as of 14 May 2026

Carlos Parra Aranzo (born 18 February 1996) is a Spanish footballer who plays for Segunda Federación club Salamanca as a right back.

== Club career ==
Born in Madrid, Parra represented Real Madrid's youth setup for seven years before joining CF Rayo Majadahonda in 2014. Initially assigned to the Juvenil squad, he made his first team debut on 25 January 2015, starting in a 6–2 Tercera División home routing of Alcobendas CF.

For the 2015–16 campaign, Parra joined CD Toledo's reserves, after a short stint at Atlético Madrid. On 23 July 2016, he moved to Fútbol Alcobendas Sport also in the fourth division.

On 12 July 2017, Parra agreed to a contract with AD Alcorcón, being initially assigned to B-team also in the fourth tier. He made his professional debut on 16 February 2019, coming on as a first-half substitute for injured Nono in a 0–1 loss at Real Oviedo in the Segunda División championship.

On 12 July 2019, Parra signed for Zamora CF also in the fourth division.

On 8 August 2024, Parra moved to Móstoles URJC in the fourth tier.
