= Solana de los Barros =

Coordinates: 38°43′30″N 6°32′20″W

- Coat of arms

- Location in Spain.
- Country: Spain
- Autonomous community: Badajoz

Area
  - Total: 65 km^{2} (25 sq mi)
- Elevation: 265 m (869 ft)

Population (2025-01-01)
  - Total: 2,522
  - Density: 39/km^{2} (100/sq mi)
- Time zone: UTC+1 (CET)
  - Summer (DST): UTC+2 (CEST)
- Website: www.solanadelosbarros.com

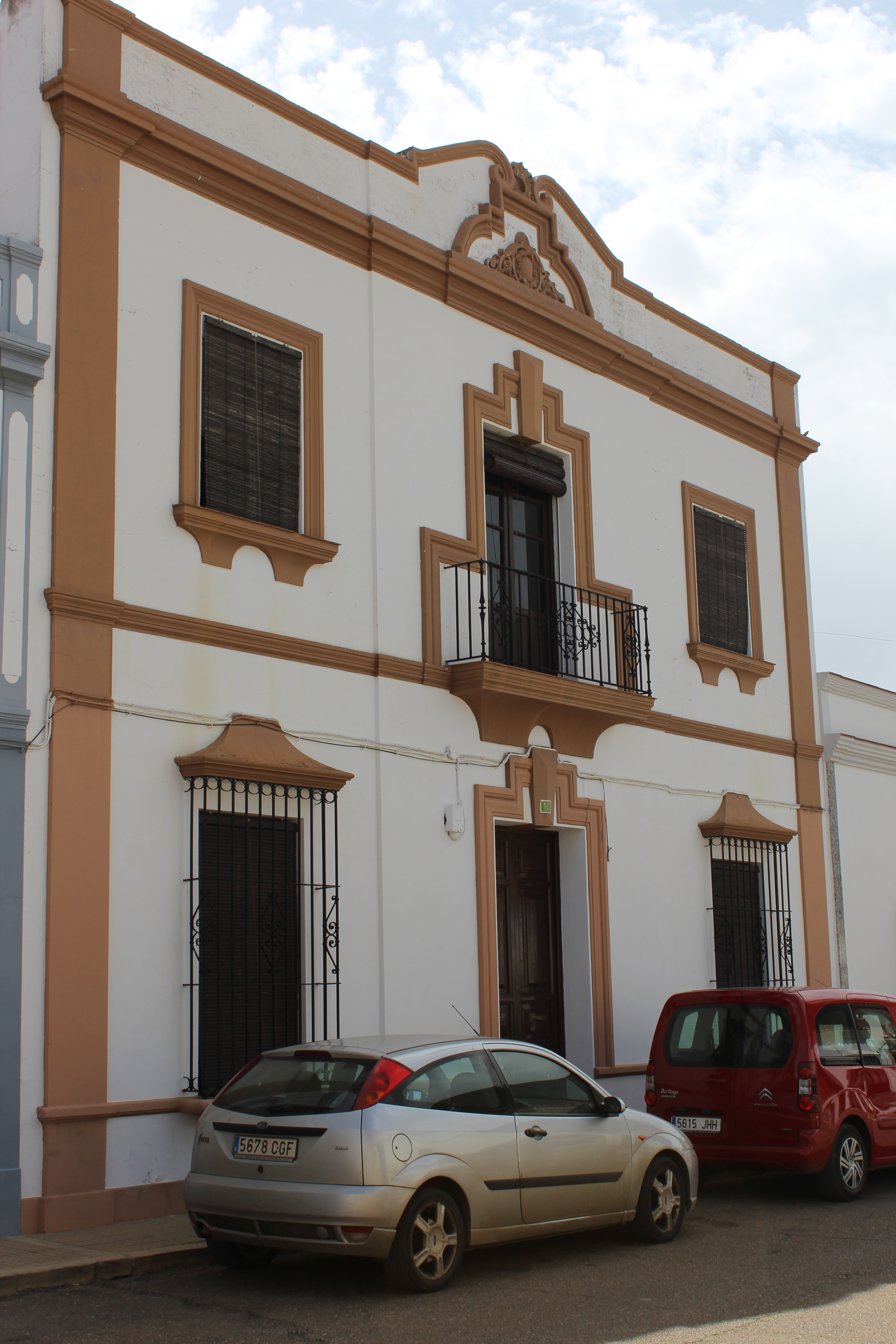
Solana de los Barros Town Hall.

Solana de los Barros is a municipality in the province of Badajoz, Extremadura, Spain. It has a population of 2,657 and an area of 65.09 km^{2} (25.13 sq mi).

== See also ==
- List of municipalities in Badajoz
