= Israel Casado =

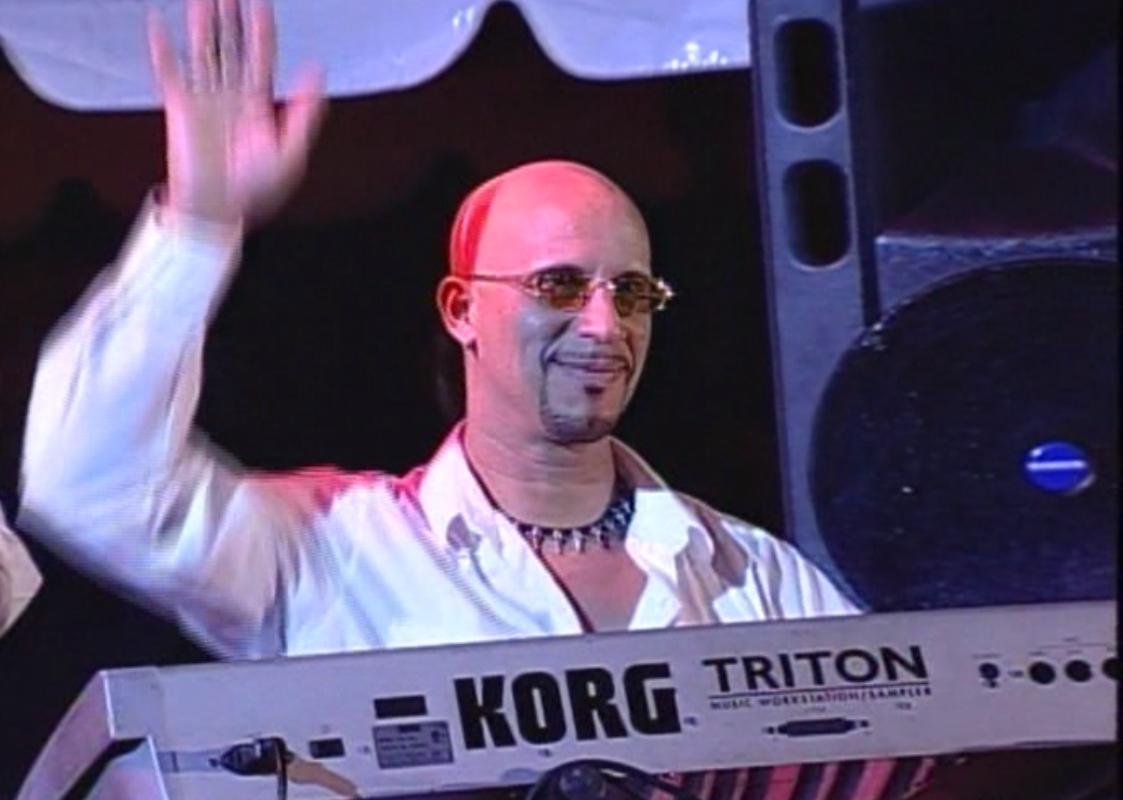

Background information
- Genres: Merengue
- Occupation: Musician
- Instrument: Piano
- Years active: 1982–present

Israel Casado, also known as Ysrael Casado, is a Dominican arranger, music coordinator, piano player, musical director, and producer. He is best known for working with artists Toño Rosario and Los Hermanos Rosario. Although he is no longer with Toño Rosario, he worked alongside Toño Rosario for over 13 years.

Israel Casado has also collaborated with Benny Sadel, Elvis Crespo, Grupo Mania, Manny Manuel, Vico C, and Miriam Cruz.

== See also ==
Toño Rosario

Los Hermanos Rosario
