= Las Rozas CF =

Association football club

Las Rozas
- Full name: Las Rozas Club de Fútbol, S.A.D.
- Founded: 1 March 1966; 60 years ago as Club Deportivo Las Rozas
- Stadium: Polideportivo Dehesa de Navalcarbón
- Capacity: 3,000
- President: Angel Campos
- Head coach: David Muñoz
- League: Tercera Federación – Group 7
- 2025–26: Tercera Federación – Group 7, 4th of 18
- Website: lasrozascf.com
Home colours

Las Rozas Club de Fútbol, S.A.D. is a Spanish football club based in Las Rozas de Madrid, in the autonomous Community of Madrid. Founded in 1966 it plays in Tercera Federación – Group 7, holding home games at Polideportivo Dehesa de Navalcarbón, which has a capacity of 3,000 spectators.

== History ==
Club Deportivo Las Rozas was founded in 1966, with the intention of promoting sport in the town. Six years later it reformed as a club, in order to compete with other professional teams in the Community of Madrid. On September 1, 1971 the club was registered in the Castilian Federation.

In the 1991–92 season Las Rozas reached the fourth division for the first time, remaining in that level for the following 18 years. From 2000 to 2002 it managed to finish second in the regular season, and won its group in 2004–05, always falling short in the subsequent promotion playoffs.

In 2009, after a merger with Unión Las Rozas, the team was renamed Las Rozas Club de Fútbol.

== Season to season ==
Logo until 2008–09

Former Logo

| Season | Tier | Division | Place | Copa del Rey |
|---|---|---|---|---|
| 1971–72 | 7 | 3ª Reg. | 11th | |
| 1972–73 | 7 | 3ª Reg. | 6th | |
| 1973–74 | 7 | 3ª Reg. P. | 1st | |
| 1974–75 | 6 | 2ª Reg. | 1st | |
| 1975–76 | 5 | 1ª Reg. | 8th | |
| 1976–77 | 5 | 1ª Reg. | 8th | |
| 1977–78 | 5 | Reg. Pref. | 6th | |
| 1978–79 | 5 | Reg. Pref. | 10th | |
| 1979–80 | 5 | Reg. Pref. | 16th | |
| 1980–81 | 6 | 1ª Reg. | 18th | |
| 1981–82 | 7 | 2ª Reg. | 16th | |
| 1982–83 | 7 | 2ª Reg. | 3rd | |
| 1983–84 | 6 | 1ª Reg. | 11th | |
| 1984–85 | 6 | 1ª Reg. | 17th | |
| 1985–86 | 7 | 2ª Reg. | W | |
| 1986–87 | 8 | 3ª Reg. | 2nd | |
| 1987–88 | 7 | 2ª Reg. | 1st | |
| 1988–89 | 6 | 1ª Reg. | 1st | |
| 1989–90 | 5 | Reg. Pref. | 7th | |
| 1990–91 | 5 | Reg. Pref. | 2nd | |

| Season | Tier | Division | Place | Copa del Rey |
|---|---|---|---|---|
| 1991–92 | 4 | 3ª | 17th | |
| 1992–93 | 4 | 3ª | 10th | |
| 1993–94 | 4 | 3ª | 5th | |
| 1994–95 | 4 | 3ª | 8th | |
| 1995–96 | 4 | 3ª | 18th | |
| 1996–97 | 5 | Reg. Pref. | 1st | |
| 1997–98 | 4 | 3ª | 15th | |
| 1998–99 | 4 | 3ª | 14th | |
| 1999–2000 | 4 | 3ª | 6th | |
| 2000–01 | 4 | 3ª | 2nd | |
| 2001–02 | 4 | 3ª | 2nd | |
| 2002–03 | 4 | 3ª | 8th | |
| 2003–04 | 4 | 3ª | 5th | |
| 2004–05 | 4 | 3ª | 1st | |
| 2005–06 | 4 | 3ª | 13th | Preliminary |
| 2006–07 | 4 | 3ª | 15th | |
| 2007–08 | 4 | 3ª | 11th | |
| 2008–09 | 4 | 3ª | 18th | |
| 2009–10 | 5 | Pref. | 1st | |
| 2010–11 | 4 | 3ª | 19th | |

| Season | Tier | Division | Place | Copa del Rey |
|---|---|---|---|---|
| 2011–12 | 5 | Pref. | 9th | |
| 2012–13 | 5 | Pref. | 4th | |
| 2013–14 | 5 | Pref. | 10th | |
| 2014–15 | 5 | Pref. | 5th | |
| 2015–16 | 5 | Pref. | 4th | |
| 2016–17 | 5 | Pref. | 8th | |
| 2017–18 | 5 | Pref. | 1st | |
| 2018–19 | 4 | 3ª | 2nd | |
| 2019–20 | 3 | 2ª B | 17th | First round |
| 2020–21 | 3 | 2ª B | 7th / 6th | Second round |
| 2021–22 | 5 | 3ª RFEF | 2nd | |
| 2022–23 | 5 | 3ª Fed. | 7th | First round |
| 2023–24 | 5 | 3ª Fed. | 4th | |
| 2024–25 | 5 | 3ª Fed. | 6th | First round |
| 2025–26 | 5 | 3ª Fed. | 4th | |
| 2026–27 | 5 | 3ª Fed. | | |

- 2 seasons in Segunda División B
- 19 seasons in Tercera División
- 6 seasons in Tercera Federación/Tercera División RFEF

== Current squad ==
As of 11 April 2021

Note: Flags indicate national team as defined under FIFA eligibility rules; some limited exceptions apply. Players may hold more than one non-FIFA nationality.

| No. | Pos. | Nation | Player |
|---|---|---|---|
| 2 | DF | FRA | Gaëtan Arib (on loan from Valenciennes) |
| 3 | DF | ESP | Jon Aurtenetxe |
| 4 | DF | ESP | Gonzalo Expósito |
| 5 | DF | ESP | Carlos Moreno |
| 6 | MF | ESP | Marcos Gullón |
| 7 | FW | ESP | Alberto Alburquerque |
| 8 | MF | ESP | Dani Provencio |
| 9 | FW | SRB | Dejan Lekić |
| 10 | FW | ESP | Mario Losada |
| 11 | FW | ESP | Tito |

| No. | Pos. | Nation | Player |
|---|---|---|---|
| 12 | MF | BRA | Augusto Galván (on loan from Real Madrid B) |
| 13 | GK | ESP | Alberto Lejárraga |
| 14 | MF | ESP | Carlos Algarra (on loan from Real Madrid B) |
| 15 | DF | ESP | Álex Malón |
| 19 | MF | ESP | David Del Pozo (on loan from Albacete) |
| 20 | FW | ESP | Adri Carrasco (on loan from Rayo Vallecano) |
| 21 | MF | ESP | Carlos Indiano |
| 22 | DF | ESP | Raúl Díez (captain) |
| 26 | FW | ESP | Rafita |
| — | DF | GEQ | Luis Meseguer |

== Honours ==
Tercera División

- Winners (1): 2004–05

== Stadium ==
Las Rozas plays at Polideportivo Municipal Dehesa de Navalcarbón, whose main football field has an athletics track, and a capacity of about 3,000 spectators.

== Famous players ==
- (Spain) Álvaro Mejía (youth)
- (Spain) Marcos Llorente (youth)
- (Morocco) Munir (youth)
- (Spain) Marcos Gullón
- (France) Loïc Badiashile

== Notable managers ==
- (Spain) Lolo Escobar
- (Spain) Guillermo Fernández Romo

== Other projects ==
Las Rozas collaborated with non-governmental organization Africa Live, providing material aid and a football team in Malawi.
