= Urduliz FT =

Association football club in Spain

Urduliz
- Full name: Urduliz Fútbol Taldea
- Founded: 1996
- Ground: Iparralde
- Capacity: 2,000
- President: Josu Unibaso
- Manager: Alain Arroyo
- League: Preferente
- 2025–26: División de Honor, 18th of 18 (relegated)
| Home colours | Away colours |

Urduliz Fútbol Taldea is a Spanish football club based in Urduliz, in the autonomous community of Basque Country. Founded in 1996, it plays in Preferente, holding home games at Estadio Iparralde, with a capacity of 2,000 people.

== History ==
Founded in 1996, Urduliz played in the seventh and sixth tiers until 2014, when the club won the Preferente and achieved promotion to the División de Honor. On 27 May 2019, the club achieved promotion to Tercera División for the first time ever.

In the 2020–21 season, the club reached the play-offs, but missed out promotion in the Final against Sestao River.

== Season to season ==
| Season | Tier | Division | Place | Copa del Rey |
|---|---|---|---|---|
| 1996–97 | 7 | 2ª Terr. | 6th | |
| 1997–98 | 7 | 2ª Terr. | 2nd | |
| 1998–99 | 7 | 2ª Terr. | 2nd | |
| 1999–2000 | 7 | 2ª Terr. | 2nd | |
| 2000–01 | 6 | 1ª Terr. | 4th | |
| 2001–02 | 6 | 1ª Terr. | 9th | |
| 2002–03 | 7 | 1ª Div. | 5th | |
| 2003–04 | 7 | 1ª Div. | 6th | |
| 2004–05 | 7 | 1ª Div. | 9th | |
| 2005–06 | 7 | 1ª Div. | 2nd | |
| 2006–07 | 6 | Pref. | 12th | |
| 2007–08 | 6 | Pref. | 16th | |
| 2008–09 | 7 | 1ª Div. | 3rd | |
| 2009–10 | 7 | 1ª Div. | 1st | |
| 2010–11 | 6 | Pref. | 13th | |
| 2011–12 | 6 | Pref. | 14th | |
| 2012–13 | 6 | Pref. | 6th | |
| 2013–14 | 6 | Pref. | 1st | |
| 2014–15 | 5 | Div. Hon. | 12th | |
| 2015–16 | 5 | Div. Hon. | 11th | |

| Season | Tier | Division | Place | Copa del Rey |
|---|---|---|---|---|
| 2016–17 | 5 | Div. Hon. | 10th | |
| 2017–18 | 5 | Div. Hon. | 5th | |
| 2018–19 | 5 | Div. Hon. | 1st | |
| 2019–20 | 4 | 3ª | 16th | |
| 2020–21 | 4 | 3ª | 2nd / 5th | |
| 2021–22 | 5 | 3ª RFEF | 14th | |
| 2022–23 | 5 | 3ª Fed. | 12th | |
| 2023–24 | 5 | 3ª Fed. | 10th | |
| 2024–25 | 5 | 3ª Fed. | 16th | |
| 2025–26 | 6 | Div. Hon. | | |

- 2 seasons in Tercera División
- 4 seasons in Tercera Federación/Tercera División RFEF
