= Juan Casado =

Argentine footballer

Personal information
- Full name: Juan Ernesto Casado
- Date of birth: 15 June 1980 (age 46)
- Place of birth: Buenos Aires, Argentina
- Height: 1.73 m (5 ft 8 in)
- Position: Midfielder

Senior career*
Years	Team	Apps	(Gls)
1995–1996	Vélez Sarsfield	11	(0)
2001–2002	Belgrano	3	(0)
2002	Olimpo	2	(0)
2003	The Strongest	2	(0)
2003–2005	San Martín de San Juan	56	(9)
2005–2006	Gimnasia LP	20	(0)
2006–2007	Platense	39	(4)
2007–2008	Belgrano	24	(3)
2008–2009	Tiro Federal	28	(2)
2009–2010	Cerro Largo	19	(2)
2010	San Martín de Tucumán	15	(1)
2011	Instituto de Córdoba	11	(1)
2012	Patronato de Paraná	18	(0)
2012	Patriotas	13	(1)
2013	Rangers	10	(1)
- * Club domestic league appearances and goals

Juan Ernesto Casado (born 15 June 1980) is an Argentine former professional footballer who played as a midfielder. He finished his career after being released from then Primera División de Chile club Rangers.
