= Iván Casado =

Spanish footballer

Personal information
- Full name: Iván Casado Ortiz
- Date of birth: 6 July 1993 (age 33)
- Place of birth: Dueñas, Spain
- Height: 1.88 m (6 ft 2 in)
- Position: Centre-back

Team information
- Current team: Salamanca UDS
- Number: 4

Youth career
- Valladolid

Senior career*
Years	Team	Apps	(Gls)
2012–2016	Valladolid B	123	(5)
2014–2015	Valladolid	1	(0)
2016–2017	Alcobendas	30	(2)
2017–2019	Izarra	44	(3)
2019–2020	Badajoz	1	(0)
2021	Salamanca UDS	8	(2)
2021–2023	Murcia	27	(0)
2023–2024	La Unión Atlético	24	(2)
2024–	Salamanca UDS	51	(2)
- * Club domestic league appearances and goals as of 14 May 2026

Iván Casado Ortiz (born 6 July 1993) is a Spanish footballer who plays as a central defender for Salamanca UDS.

== Career ==
Born in Dueñas, Palencia, Castile and León, Casado finished his formation at Real Valladolid, and made his senior debuts with the reserves in the 2012–13 campaign in Tercera División.

Casado played his first match as a professional on 7 June 2015, starting in a 4–2 home loss against UE Llagostera in the Segunda División championship.
