= Calvo Sotelo Puertollano CF =

Association football club in Spain

Calvo Sotelo
- Full name: Calvo Sotelo de Puertollano Club de Fútbol
- Founded: 5 June 2015; 11 years ago
- Ground: Ciudad de Puertollano
- Capacity: 7,240
- President: Pedro León
- Head coach: Darío Martín
- League: Segunda Federación – Group 5
- 2025–26: Tercera Federación – Group 18, 1st of 18 (champions)
- Website: https://www.cspuertollano.com
Home colours	Away colours

Calvo Sotelo de Puertollano Club de Fútbol (or CS Puertollano) is a Spanish football team located in Puertollano, Ciudad Real, in the autonomous community of Castilla–La Mancha. Founded in 2015, it currently plays in Segunda Federación – Group 5, holding home matches at Estadio Ciudad de Puertollano, which has a capacity of 7,240 spectators.

== History ==
The club was founded in June 2015, right after the dissolution of another local club, CD Puertollano. Máximo Saez became its first president.

== Season to season ==
Season	Tier	Division	Place	Copa del Rey
2015–16	7	2ª Aut.	1st	
2016–17	6	1ª Aut.	1st	
2017–18	5	Aut. Pref.	1st	
2018–19	4	3ª	9th	
2019–20	4	3ª	7th	
2020–21	4	3ª	2nd	
2021–22	4	2ª RFEF	17th	First round
2022–23	5	3ª Fed.	4th	
2023–24	5	3ª Fed.	6th	
2024–25	5	3ª Fed.	9th	
2025–26	5	3ª Fed.	1st	
2026–27	4	2ª Fed.		TBD

- 2 seasons in Segunda Federación/Segunda División RFEF
- 3 seasons in Tercera División
- 4 seasons in Tercera Federación
