= Salamanca CF UDS =

Association football club in Spain

Salamanca UDS
- Full name: Salamanca Club de Fútbol UDS
- Founded: 12 August 2013; 13 years ago
- Ground: Estadio Helmántico
- Capacity: 17,341
- Owner(s): Desarrollos Empresariales Deportivos, S. L.
- President: Manuel Lovato
- Head coach: Iker Muniain
- League: Segunda Federación – Group 5
- 2025–26: Segunda Federación – Group 1, 8th of 18
- Website: salamancacfuds.es
| Home colours | Away colours |

Salamanca Club de Fútbol UDS, previously known as CF Salmantino, is a Spanish football team based in Salamanca, in the autonomous community of Castile and León. Founded in 2013 after the dissolution of UD Salamanca, it currently plays in Segunda Federación – Group 5, holding home games at the Estadio Helmántico with a 17,341-seat capacity.

== History ==
After the dissolution of UD Salamanca in 2013, some managers of the entity decided to refound the farm team to preserve the legacy of the historical club. With that aim, they created CD CF Salmantino. At first, it started playing in the same division as the old reserve team of Salamanca. Nevertheless, the Royal Spanish Football Federation decided in 2015 to relegate all the teams of the club to the lowest tier, as they considered the new CF Salmantino to be a newly founded club, completely independent of UDS.

In the 2015–16 season, the first after the administrative relegation, the club was promoted to fifth tier, and repeated success for coming back to Tercera División two years after the judicial statement.

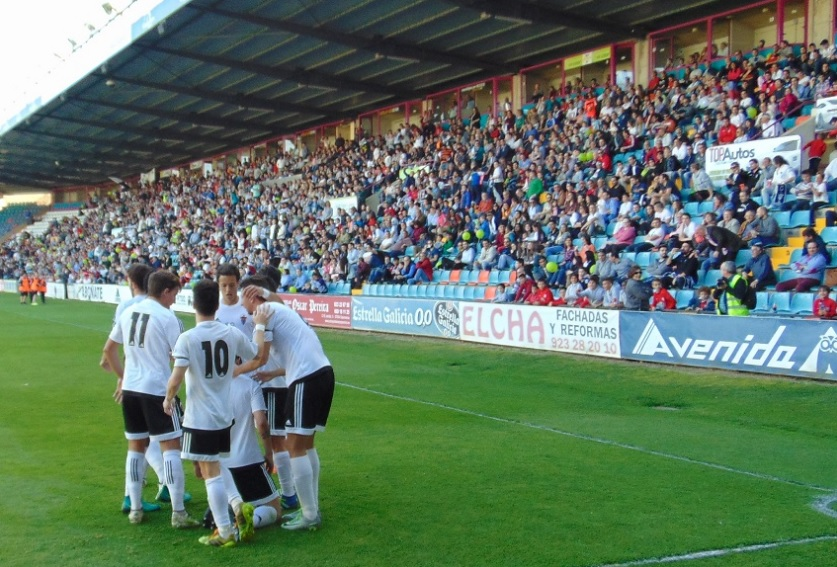
Salmantino players celebrate a goal in 2017.

On 24 June 2018, just in their first season after the comeback, Salmantino promoted to Segunda División B by eliminating Compostela in the last round of the promotion play-offs. On 4 July 2018 José Miguel Campos was appointed the new head coach of the club. On 24 July, the club requested the Royal Spanish Football Federation to change the name to Salamanca CF UDS, recovering the name of former side UD Salamanca, and to use their logo. However, this change was initially not admitted, arguing that the request was presented out of date, but was finally approved on 14 September 2018.

On 18 September 2019 it was announced that Pablo Cortes would be the coach for the entire 2019–20 season. But on 28 October 2019 the club has fired him.

=== Club background ===
- UD Salamanca (1923–2013)

Club naming

- CD CF Salmantino (2013–2017)
- CF Salmantino UDS (2017–2018)
- Salamanca CF UDS (2018–)

== Season to season ==
| Season | Tier | Division | Place | Copa del Rey |
|---|---|---|---|---|
| 2013–14 | 4 | 3ª | 9th | |
| 2014–15 | 4 | 3ª | 9th | |
| 2015–16 | 6 | 1ª Prov. | 1st | |
| 2016–17 | 5 | 1ª Reg. | 1st | |
| 2017–18 | 4 | 3ª | 4th | |
| 2018–19 | 3 | 2ª B | 12th | |
| 2019–20 | 3 | 2ª B | 13th | |
| 2020–21 | 3 | 2ª B | 9th / 2nd | |
| 2021–22 | 4 | 2ª RFEF | 15th | |
| 2022–23 | 5 | 3ª Fed. | 3rd | |
| 2023–24 | 5 | 3ª Fed. | 2nd | |
| 2024–25 | 4 | 2ª Fed. | 9th | Second round |
| 2025–26 | 4 | 2ª Fed. | 8th | |
| 2026–27 | 4 | 2ª Fed. | | First round |

- 3 seasons in Segunda División B
- 4 seasons in Segunda Federación/Segunda División RFEF
- 3 seasons in Tercera División
- 2 seasons in Tercera Federación

== Stadium ==
Salamanca UDS plays in the Estadio Helmántico, with capacity for 17,341 spectators. After the dissolution of the Union Deportiva Salamanca, in the process of liquidation of the bankruptcy, the stadium went to auction, and finally was acquired by Desarrollos Empresariales Deportivos S.L., directed by the Mexican entrepreneur Miguel Alejandro Miranda which shares with Salmantino the sports project and allows them the use of the stadium.

== Fans ==
During the summer of 2016, the club launched a campaign of subscribers directed especially to former members of the UD Salamanca, which promises to reserve the seat that they occupied during the matches of UD Salamanca once the Helmático is fully reopened (probably for the 2017–18 season). At the end of 2016 the club counted with 4,000 subscribers.

== Current squad ==
As of 12 February 2026

Note: Flags indicate national team as defined under FIFA eligibility rules; some limited exceptions apply. Players may hold more than one non-FIFA nationality.

| No. | Pos. | Nation | Player |
|---|---|---|---|
| 1 | GK | ESP | Jon Villanueva |
| 2 | DF | ESP | Carlos Parra |
| 3 | DF | MLI | Souleymane Gassama |
| 4 | DF | ESP | Iván Casado |
| 5 | DF | ESP | Javier Murua |
| 6 | MF | ESP | José Manuel Lara |
| 7 | FW | ESP | Dani Hernández |
| 8 | DF | ESP | Alex Alba |
| 9 | FW | URU | Pablo Servetti |
| 10 | MF | ESP | Carlos Cristeto |
| 11 | FW | ESP | Adrián Mancebo |
| 12 | DF | ESP | Joan Pulpón |

| No. | Pos. | Nation | Player |
|---|---|---|---|
| 13 | GK | GBS | Leo Mendes |
| 15 | MF | ESP | Raúl Carrasco |
| 16 | FW | ESP | Abaraham Nobrega |
| 17 | FW | ESP | Álex Gonpi |
| 18 | DF | ESP | Hugo Marcos |
| 19 | FW | ESP | Miguel Serrano |
| 20 | DF | ESP | Oscar Marotías |
| 21 | FW | ESP | Aimar Barrera |
| 22 | MF | ESP | Hugo Parra |
| 23 | FW | ESP | Javi Delgado |
| — | FW | ESP | Davo Fernández |

== Rivalries ==
Salamanca UDS has a strong rivalry with Unionistas de Salamanca CF, another team in the city formed after the collapse of the original club.

While Salamanca UDS claims to be the continuation of the former UD Salamanca, Unionistas was born as a homage of the former club, dissolved in 2013.

== See also ==
- Salamanca CF UDS B, reserve team
