= CF Platges de Calvià =

Spanish association football club

Platges de Calvià
- Full name: Club de Fútbol Platges de Calvià
- Founded: 1942; 84 years ago (as CD Montuiri)
- Ground: Municipal de Magaluf, Calviá, Majorca, Balearic Islands, Spain
- Capacity: 3,500
- Chairman: (Spain) Armando Lupo Pérez Costas
- Manager: (Spain) Carlos Martínez
- League: Tercera Federación – Group 11
- 2025–26: Tercera Federación – Group 11, 10th of 18
| Home colours | Away colours |

Club de Fútbol Platges de Calvià, previously known as Club Deportivo Montuiri, is a football team based in Calvià, Balearic Islands. Founded in 1942, the team plays in Tercera Federación – Group 11, holding home games at the Poliesportiu Municipal de Magaluf with 3,500 seating capacity.

== History ==
Founded in 1942 as CD Montuïri, the club spent 19 seasons in Tercera División before being absorbed by CF Platges de Calvià in June 2016. The original CF Platges de Calvià, who had been relegated, became the club's reserve team.

== Season to season ==
- As CD Montuïri

| Season | Tier | Division | Place | Copa del Rey |
|---|---|---|---|---|
| 1946–47 | 5 | 3ª Reg. | 1st | |
| 1947–48 | 5 | 3ª Reg. | 5th | |
| 1948–49 | 4 | 1ª Reg. | 7th | |
| 1949–50 | DNP | | | |
| 1950–51 | 5 | 3ª Reg. | | |
| 1951–52 | 5 | 3ª Reg. | 3rd | |
| 1952–53 | 4 | 1ª Reg. | 8th | |
| 1953–54 | 4 | 1ª Reg. | 7th | |
| 1954–55 | 4 | 1ª Reg. | 12th | |
| 1955–56 | 6 | 3ª Reg. | 2nd | |
| 1956–57 | 5 | 2ª Reg. | | |
| 1957–58 | 4 | 1ª Reg. | 5th | |
| 1958–59 | 4 | 1ª Reg. | 4th | |
| 1959–60 | 4 | 1ª Reg. | (R) | |
| 1960–61 | DNP | | | |
| 1961–62 | DNP | | | |
| 1962–63 | DNP | | | |
| 1963–64 | 5 | 2ª Reg. | 1st | |
| 1964–65 | 5 | 2ª Reg. | | |
| 1965–66 | 4 | 1ª Reg. | 5th | |

| Season | Tier | Division | Place | Copa del Rey |
|---|---|---|---|---|
| 1966–67 | 5 | 2ª Reg. | | |
| 1967–68 | 5 | 2ª Reg. | 10th | |
| 1968–69 | 5 | 2ª Reg. | 1st | |
| 1969–70 | 4 | 1ª Reg. | 8th | |
| 1970–71 | 4 | 1ª Reg. | 12th | |
| 1971–72 | 4 | 1ª Reg. | 11th | |
| 1972–73 | 5 | 1ª Reg. | 9th | |
| 1973–74 | 5 | 1ª Reg. | 8th | |
| 1974–75 | 5 | 1ª Reg. | 8th | |
| 1975–76 | 5 | 1ª Reg. | 12th | |
| 1976–77 | 5 | 1ª Reg. | 10th | |
| 1977–78 | 6 | 1ª Reg. | 14th | |
| 1978–79 | 6 | 1ª Reg. | 13th | |
| 1979–80 | 6 | 1ª Reg. | 4th | |
| 1980–81 | 6 | 1ª Reg. | 10th | |
| 1981–82 | 6 | 1ª Reg. | 3rd | |
| 1982–83 | 5 | Reg. Pref. | 7th | |
| 1983–84 | 5 | Reg. Pref. | 4th | |
| 1984–85 | 5 | Reg. Pref. | 3rd | |
| 1985–86 | 4 | 3ª | 14th | |

| Season | Tier | Division | Place | Copa del Rey |
|---|---|---|---|---|
| 1986–87 | 4 | 3ª | 18th | |
| 1987–88 | 5 | Reg. Pref. | 7th | |
| 1988–89 | 5 | Reg. Pref. | 10th | |
| 1989–90 | 5 | Reg. Pref. | 4th | |
| 1990–91 | 5 | Reg. Pref. | 13th | |
| 1991–92 | 5 | Reg. Pref. | 12th | |
| 1992–93 | 5 | Reg. Pref. | 3rd | |
| 1993–94 | 4 | 3ª | 3rd | |
| 1994–95 | 4 | 3ª | 18th | |
| 1995–96 | 5 | Reg. Pref. | 19th | |
| 1996–97 | 6 | 1ª Reg. | 1st | |
| 1997–98 | 5 | Reg. Pref. | 2nd | |
| 1998–99 | 5 | Reg. Pref. | 2nd | |
| 1999–2000 | 5 | Reg. Pref. | 2nd | |
| 2000–01 | 4 | 3ª | 13th | |

| Season | Tier | Division | Place | Copa del Rey |
|---|---|---|---|---|
| 2001–02 | 4 | 3ª | 10th | |
| 2002–03 | 4 | 3ª | 15th | |
| 2003–04 | 4 | 3ª | 7th | |
| 2004–05 | 4 | 3ª | 12th | |
| 2005–06 | 4 | 3ª | 6th | |
| 2006–07 | 4 | 3ª | 17th | |
| 2007–08 | 4 | 3ª | 15th | |
| 2008–09 | 4 | 3ª | 8th | |
| 2009–10 | 4 | 3ª | 11th | |
| 2010–11 | 4 | 3ª | 12th | |
| 2011–12 | 4 | 3ª | 4th | |
| 2012–13 | 4 | 3ª | 13th | |
| 2013–14 | 4 | 3ª | 17th | |
| 2014–15 | 4 | 3ª | 11th | |
| 2015–16 | 4 | 3ª | 9th | |

- As CF Platges de Calvià

| Season | Tier | Division | Place | Copa del Rey |
|---|---|---|---|---|
| 2016–17 | 4 | 3ª | 7th | |
| 2017–18 | 4 | 3ª | 5th | |
| 2018–19 | 4 | 3ª | 6th | |
| 2019–20 | 4 | 3ª | 5th | |
| 2020–21 | 4 | 3ª | 1st / 3rd | |
| 2021–22 | 5 | 3ª RFEF | 4th | |
| 2022–23 | 5 | 3ª Fed. | 8th | |
| 2023–24 | 5 | 3ª Fed. | 14th | |
| 2024–25 | 5 | 3ª Fed. | 6th | |
| 2025–26 | 5 | 3ª Fed. | 10th | |
| 2026–27 | 5 | 3ª Fed. | | |

- 25 seasons in Tercera División
- 6 seasons in Tercera Federación/Tercera División RFEF
