= Estadio Ciudad de Puertollano =

Multi-use stadium in Spain

Coordinates: 38.6828°N 4.0887°W

Ciudad de Puertollano
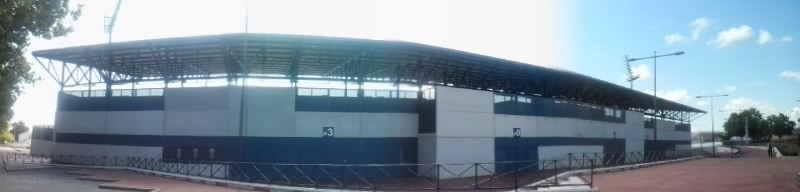
- Interactive map of Ciudad de Puertollano
- Full name: Nuevo Estadio Municipal Ciudad de Puertollano
- Location: Puertollano, Spain
- Capacity: 7,240
- Surface: Grass
- Field size: 105 m × 64 m (344 ft × 210 ft)

Construction
- Opened: 2010

Tenant
- CD Puertollano

The Estadio Ciudad de Puertollano is a multi-use stadium located in Puertollano, Castile-La Mancha, Spain. It is currently used for football matches and is the home stadium of CD Puertollano.

The stadium inauguration saw CD Puertollano draw 2-2 with Sevilla Atletico on 21 November 2010. Built by the municipality at a cost of € 7 million, the new arena has an all seated capacity of 7,240, arranged on three open banks of blue and white seating and a large covered main stand to the north side of the stadium. This stand also features 17 private boxes, modern media facilities, changing rooms and an indoor warm-up area for the players. The development is complete with an artificial training pitch behind the southern bank of seating.
