= Beti Kozkor KE =

Association football club in Spain

Beti Kozkor
- Full name: Beti Kozkor Kirol Elkartea
- Founded: 1997
- Ground: Plazaola, Lekunberri, Navarre, Spain
- Capacity: 500
- Chairman: Jose Mari Aierdi
- Manager: Rodri Barrena
- League: Tercera Federación – Group 15
- 2025–26: Tercera Federación – Group 15, 7th of 18
Home colours	Away colours

Beti Kozkor Kirol Elkartea is a Spanish football team based in Lekunberri, in the autonomous community of Navarre. Founded in 1997, it plays in Tercera Federación – Group 15, holding home matches at Estadio Municipal Manuel Meler.

== History ==
Founded in 1997 as Club Deportivo Lekumberri, the club started playing in the Primera Regional Navarra the following campaign. The club changed to its current name in 2003, and only achieved promotion to the Regional Preferente in 2014.

In 2017, after three seasons in the fifth division, Beti Kozkor achieved promotion to Tercera División for the first time ever. In May 2019, the club reached the play-offs.

== Season to season ==
Season	Tier	Division	Place	Copa del Rey
1998–99	6	1ª Reg.	15th	
1999–2000	6	1ª Reg.	14th	
2000–01	6	1ª Reg.	12th	
2001–02	6	1ª Reg.	11th	
2002–03	6	1ª Reg.	9th	
2003–04	6	1ª Reg.	11th	
2004–05	6	1ª Reg.	8th	
2005–06	6	1ª Reg.	11th	
2006–07	6	1ª Reg.	8th	
2007–08	6	1ª Reg.	6th	
2008–09	6	1ª Reg.	14th	
2009–10	6	1ª Reg.	11th	
2010–11	6	1ª Reg.	11th	
2011–12	6	1ª Reg.	10th	
2012–13	6	1ª Reg.	10th	
2013–14	6	1ª Reg.	1st	
2014–15	5	Reg. Pref.	5th	
2015–16	5	1ª Aut.	5th	
2016–17	5	1ª Aut.	1st	
2017–18	4	3ª	10th	

Season	Tier	Division	Place	Copa del Rey
2018–19	4	3ª	4th	
2019–20	4	3ª	3rd	
2020–21	4	3ª	2nd / 3rd	
2021–22	5	3ª RFEF	14th	
2022–23	6	1ª Aut.	1st	
2023–24	5	3ª Fed.	11th	
2024–25	5	3ª Fed.	12th	
2025–26	5	3ª Fed.	7th	
2026–27	5	3ª Fed.		

- 4 seasons in Tercera División
- 5 seasons in Tercera Federación/Tercera División RFEF
