= CF Pozuelo de Alarcón =

Association football club in Spain

Pozuelo de Alarcón
- Full name: Club de Fútbol Pozuelo de Alarcón
- Founded: 1995
- Ground: Valle de las Cañas; Pozuelo de Alarcón, Community of Madrid, Madrid
- Capacity: 2,000
- Chairman: Isaac Cardoso
- Manager: Juan José Granero
- League: Tercera Federación – Group 7
- 2025–26: Tercera Federación – Group 7, 9th of 18
- Website: www.cfpozuelo.com
Home colours	Away colours

Club de Fútbol Pozuelo de Alarcón is a football team based in Pozuelo de Alarcón in the autonomous Community of Madrid. Founded in 1995, the team plays in Tercera Federación – Group 7. The club's home ground is Estadio Valle de las Cañas, which has a capacity of 2,000 spectators.

== History ==
Club Deportivo Pozuelo were founded on 28 August 1943, and were renamed to Pozuelo Club de Fútbol. In 1975, they changed to Unión Deportiva Pozuelo and played for two seasons in Tercera División. Parque Atracciones Pozuelo Club de Fútbol, however, were founded in 1975, renamed to Parque Atlético Pozuelo Club de Fútbol in 1980, and only played in the regional leagues.

In 1995, both clubs merged to form Club de Fútbol Pozuelo de Alarcón. The new club took the place of Parque Atlético in the Regional Preferente, while the place of UD Pozuelo went to the reserve team (which folded in 2002). Pozuelo first reached the fourth tier in 2007.

== Season to season ==
=== CD Pozuelo / UD Pozuelo ===
Season	Tier	Division	Place	Copa del Rey
1943–44	5	3ª Reg.	7th	
1944–45	6	3ª Reg.	8th	
1945–46	6	3ª Reg.	5th	
1946–47	7	3ª Reg.	6th	
1947–48	7	3ª Reg.	6th	
1948–49	7	3ª Reg.	4th	
1949–50	7	3ª Reg.	10th	
1950–51	7	3ª Reg.	8th	
1951–52	6	2ª Reg.	12th	
1952–53	7	3ª Reg.	6th	
1953–54	7	3ª Reg.	7th	
1954–55	7	4ª Reg.	9th	
1955–56	7	4ª Reg.	8th	
1956–57	6	3ª Reg.	2nd	
1957–58	6	3ª Reg.	5th	
1958–59	6	3ª Reg.	12th	
1959–60	6	3ª Reg.	1st	
1960–61	5	2ª Reg.	8th	
1961–62	5	2ª Reg.	12th	
1962–63	5	2ª Reg.	10th	

Season	Tier	Division	Place	Copa del Rey
1963–64	4	1ª Reg.	16th	
1964–65	5	2ª Reg.	18th	
1965–66	6	3ª Reg.	11th	
1966–67	6	3ª Reg.	8th	
1967–68	6	3ª Reg.	12th	
1968–69	6	3ª Reg.	12th	
1969–70	7	3ª Reg.	8th	
1970–71	7	3ª Reg.	4th	
1971–72	7	3ª Reg.	2nd	
1972–73	5	2ª Reg.	4th	
1973–74	5	1ª Reg.	6th	
1974–75	4	Reg. Pref.	13th	
1975–76	5	1ª Reg.	13th	
1976–77	6	2ª Reg.	2nd	
1977–78	6	1ª Reg.	6th	
1978–79	6	1ª Reg.	7th	
1979–80	6	1ª Reg.	3rd	
1980–81	5	Reg. Pref.	15th	
1981–82	6	1ª Reg.	13th	
1982–83	6	1ª Reg.	9th	

Season	Tier	Division	Place	Copa del Rey
1983–84	6	1ª Reg.	1st	
1984–85	5	Reg. Pref.	3rd	
1985–86	5	Reg. Pref.	10th	
1986–87	5	Reg. Pref.	7th	
1987–88	4	3ª	16th	
1988–89	4	3ª	20th	
1989–90	5	Reg. Pref.	17th	
1990–91	6	1ª Reg.	2nd	
1991–92	5	Reg. Pref.	17th	
1992–93	6	1ª Reg.	10th	
1993–94	6	1ª Reg.	13th	

- 2 seasons in Tercera División

=== Parque Atlético Pozuelo CF ===
Season	Tier	Division	Place	Copa del Rey
1975–76	8	3ª Reg.	4th	
1976–77	8	3ª Reg.	2nd	
1977–78	8	3ª Reg. P.	14th	
1978–79	8	3ª Reg. P.	16th	
1979–80	9	3ª Reg.	7th	
1980–81	9	3ª Reg.	9th	
1981–82	9	3ª Reg.	9th	
1982–83	8	3ª Reg. P.	6th	
1983–84	8	3ª Reg. P.	3rd	
1984–85	8	3ª Reg. P.	3rd	

Season	Tier	Division	Place	Copa del Rey
1985–86	8	3ª Reg. P.	1st	
1986–87	7	2ª Reg.	2nd	
1987–88	6	1ª Reg.	13th	
1988–89	6	1ª Reg.	6th	
1989–90	6	1ª Reg.	5th	
1990–91	6	1ª Reg.	3rd	
1991–92	6	1ª Reg.	8th	
1992–93	6	1ª Reg.	11th	
1993–94	6	1ª Reg.	2nd	
1994–95	5	Reg. Pref.	8th	

=== CF Pozuelo de Alarcón ===
Season	Tier	Division	Place	Copa del Rey
1995–96	5	Reg. Pref.	3rd	
1996–97	5	Reg. Pref.	15th	
1997–98	6	1ª Reg.	8th	
1998–99	6	1ª Reg.	9th	
1999–2000	6	1ª Reg.	9th	
2000–01	6	1ª Reg.	1st	
2001–02	5	Reg. Pref.	6th	
2002–03	5	Reg. Pref.	6th	
2003–04	5	Reg. Pref.	4th	
2004–05	5	Reg. Pref.	5th	
2005–06	5	Reg. Pref.	7th	
2006–07	5	Reg. Pref.	2nd	
2007–08	4	3ª	16th	
2008–09	4	3ª	20th	
2009–10	5	Pref.	2nd	
2010–11	4	3ª	2nd	
2011–12	4	3ª	9th	
2012–13	4	3ª	5th	
2013–14	4	3ª	6th	
2014–15	4	3ª	10th	

Season	Tier	Division	Place	Copa del Rey
2015–16	4	3ª	3rd	
2016–17	4	3ª	14th	
2017–18	4	3ª	5th	
2018–19	4	3ª	16th	
2019–20	4	3ª	8th	
2020–21	4	3ª	4th / 2nd	
2021–22	5	3ª RFEF	11th	
2022–23	5	3ª Fed.	9th	
2023–24	5	3ª Fed.	18th	
2024–25	6	1ª Aut.	2nd	
2025–26	5	3ª Fed.	9th	
2026–27	5	3ª Fed.		

- 13 seasons in Tercera División
- 5 seasons in Tercera Federación/Tercera División RFEF

== Uniform ==
- Uniform holder: green shirt, green trousers and half white.
- Uniform alternative: red T-shirt, white trousers and half red.

== Stadium ==
The CF Pozuelo de Alarcón plays its matches in the local as Ciudad Deportiva Valle de Las Cañas, with capacity for 2,000 spectators.
