= CD Estradense =

Association football club in Spain

Coordinates: 42.689787°N 8.506845°W

Estradense
- Full name: Club Deportivo Estradense
- Nickname: Los Rojillos
- Founded: 17 August 1925; 101 years ago
- Stadium: A Nova Baiuca
- Capacity: 600
- President: Toño Camba
- Head coach: Manuti
- League: Tercera Federación – Group 1
- 2025–26: Tercera Federación – Group 1, 4th of 18
Home colours	Away colours

Club Deportivo Estradense is a Spanish football team based in A Estrada, in the autonomous community of Galicia. Founded in 1925, the club was federated in 1959. It plays in Tercera Federación – Group 1, holding home matches at Nuevo Campo Municipal, with a 600-seat capacity.

== Season to season ==
Season	Tier	Division	Place	Copa del Rey
1959–60	5	1ª Reg.	8th	
1960–61	4	Serie A	9th	
1961–62	4	Serie A	4th	
1962–63	4	Serie A	9th	
1963–64	4	Serie A	6th	
1964–65	4	Serie A	11th	
1965–66	4	Serie A	4th	
1966–67	4	Serie A	12th	
1967–68	4	Serie A	12th	
1968–69	4	Serie A	16th	
1969–70	4	Serie A	12th	
1970–71	4	Serie A	17th	
1971–72	4	Serie A	16th	
1972–73	4	Serie A	13th	
1973–74	4	Serie A	13th	
1974–75	4	Serie A	14th	
1975–76	4	Serie A	16th	
1976–77	4	Serie A	20th	
1977–78	5	Serie A	20th	
1978–79	6	1ª Reg.	16th	

Season	Tier	Division	Place	Copa del Rey
1979–80	7	2ª Reg.	6th	
1980–81	7	2ª Reg.	2nd	
1981–82	6	1ª Reg.	17th	
1982–83	7	2ª Reg.	1st	
1983–84	6	1ª Reg.	7th	
1984–85	6	1ª Reg.	8th	
1985–86	6	1ª Reg.	3rd	
1986–87	6	1ª Reg.	4th	
1987–88	6	1ª Reg.	1st	
1988–89	5	Reg. Pref.	13th	
1989–90	5	Reg. Pref.	3rd	
1990–91	5	Reg. Pref.	1st	
1991–92	4	3ª	7th	
1992–93	4	3ª	10th	First round
1993–94	4	3ª	8th	
1994–95	4	3ª	12th	
1995–96	4	3ª	6th	
1996–97	4	3ª	17th	
1997–98	4	3ª	18th	
1998–99	5	Reg. Pref.	8th	

Season	Tier	Division	Place	Copa del Rey
1999–2000	5	Reg. Pref.	8th	
2000–01	5	Reg. Pref.	4th	
2001–02	5	Reg. Pref.	8th	
2002–03	5	Reg. Pref.	16th	
2003–04	5	Reg. Pref.	18th	
2004–05	6	1ª Reg.	1st	
2005–06	5	Reg. Pref.	7th	
2006–07	5	Pref. Aut.	6th	
2007–08	5	Pref. Aut.	11th	
2008–09	5	Pref. Aut.	3rd	
2009–10	5	Pref. Aut.	2nd	
2010–11	4	3ª	12th	
2011–12	4	3ª	17th	
2012–13	5	Pref. Aut.	15th	
2013–14	5	Pref. Aut.	9th	
2014–15	5	Pref. Aut.	4th	
2015–16	5	Pref.	6th	
2016–17	5	Pref.	5th	
2017–18	5	Pref.	4th	
2018–19	5	Pref.	2nd	

Season	Tier	Division	Place	Copa del Rey
2019–20	4	3ª	10th	
2020–21	4	3ª	4th / 1st	
2021–22	5	3ª RFEF	8th	
2022–23	5	3ª Fed.	9th	
2023–24	5	3ª Fed.	8th	
2024–25	5	3ª Fed.	2nd	
2025–26	5	3ª Fed.	4th	
2026–27	5	3ª Fed.		

- 11 seasons in Tercera División
- 6 seasons in Tercera Federación/Tercera División RFEF
