= UD Ciudad de Torredonjimeno =

Association football club in Spain

Ciudad de Torredonjimeno
- Full name: Unión Deportiva Ciudad de Torredonjimeno
- Founded: 2009
- Ground: Matías Prats; Torredonjimeno, Spain
- Capacity: 4,500
- Chairman: Juan Carlos Pamos
- Manager: Manuel Chumilla
- League: Tercera Federación – Group 9
- 2025–26: Tercera Federación – Group 9, 7th of 18
- Website: http://www.udctorredonjimeno.es
Home colours	Away colours

Unión Deportiva Ciudad de Torredonjimeno is a Spanish football team based in Torredonjimeno, in the autonomous community of Andalusia. Founded in 2009 as a replacement for dissolved Torredonjimeno CF, it plays in Tercera Federación – Group 9, holding home matches at Estadio Municipal Matías Prats, which holds a capacity of 4,500 people.

== Season to season ==
Season	Tier	Division	Place	Copa del Rey
2009–10	7	1ª Prov.	3rd	
2010–11	7	1ª Prov.	1st	
2011–12	6	Reg. Pref.	2nd	
2012–13	5	1ª And.	6th	
2013–14	5	1ª And.	7th	
2014–15	5	1ª And.	2nd	
2015–16	5	1ª And.	2nd	
2016–17	4	3ª	12th	
2017–18	4	3ª	11th	
2018–19	4	3ª	9th	
2019–20	4	3ª	6th	
2020–21	4	3ª	3rd	
2021–22	5	3ª RFEF	7th	
2022–23	5	3ª Fed.	8th	
2023–24	5	3ª Fed.	10th	
2024–25	5	3ª Fed.	12th	
2025–26	5	3ª Fed.	7th	
2026–27	5	3ª Fed.		

- 5 seasons in Tercera División
- 6 seasons in Tercera Federación/Tercera División RFEF
