= Chuma =

Chuma may refer to:

== People ==
- James Chuma (c. 1850–1882), assistant of David Livingstone, caravan leader on further expeditions
- Chuma Edoga (born 1997), American football player
- Chuma Okeke (born 1998), American basketball player
- Chuma (footballer) (born 1997), Spanish footballer

== Other uses ==
- Chūma, a medieval Japanese transport system
- Chuma, La Paz, a municipality in Bolivia
- Islands' Fraternity and Unity Party, a political party in the Comoros known by the acronym CHUMA
- The word for plague in many slavic languages
