= 2019 Tercera División play-offs =

Spanish football league play-offs

The 2019 Tercera División play-offs to Segunda División B from Tercera División (Promotion play-offs) were the final playoffs for the promotion from 2018–19 Tercera División to 2019–20 Segunda División B. The first four teams in each group took part in the play-off.

== Format ==
The eighteen group winners have the opportunity to be promoted directly to Segunda División B. The eighteen group winners will be drawn into a two-legged series where the nine winners will promote to Segunda División B. The nine losing clubs will enter the play-off round for the last nine promotion spots.

The eighteen runners-up will be drawn against one of the eighteen fourth-placed clubs outside their group and the eighteen third-placed clubs will be drawn against one another in a two-legged series. The twenty-seven winners will advance with the nine losing clubs from the champions' series to determine the eighteen teams that will enter the last two-legged series for the last nine promotion spots. In all the playoff series, the lower-ranked club play at home first. Whenever there is a tie in position (e.g. like the group winners in the champions' series or the third-placed teams in the first round), a draw determines the club to play at home first.

== Group Winners promotion play-off ==
=== Qualified teams ===
Group	Team
1	Racing Ferrol
2	Lealtad
3	Escobedo
4	Portugalete
5	Llagostera
6	Orihuela
7	Getafe B
8	Zamora
9	Jaén

Group	Team
10	Cádiz B
11	Peña Deportiva
12	Tamaraceite
13	Yeclano
14	Mérida
15	Osasuna B
16	Haro
17	Tarazona
18	Socuéllamos

=== Matches ===
Team 1	Agg.	Team 2	1st leg	2nd leg
Yeclano	6–1	Escobedo	6–0	0–1
Zamora	2–2 (a)	Haro	2–1	0–1
Racing Ferrol	2–2 (a)	Jaén	1–0	1–2
Cádiz B	1–4	Osasuna B	0–1	1–3
Lealtad	3–4	Getafe B	2–0	1–4
Tamaraceite	2–3	Peña Deportiva	1–1	1–2 (a.e.t.)
Llagostera	3–1	Portugalete	2–0	1–1
Socuéllamos	0–0 (6–7 p)	Mérida	0–0	0–0 (a.e.t.)
Tarazona	1–3	Orihuela	0–1	1–2

Promoted to Segunda División B
Getafe B (3 years later)	Haro (14 years later)	Llagostera (One year later)	Mérida (One year later)	Orihuela (6 years later)	Osasuna B (One year later)	Peña Deportiva (One year later)	Racing Ferrol (One year later)	Yeclano (6 years later)

== Non-champions promotion play-off ==
=== First round ===
==== Qualified teams ====
Group	Pos.	Team
1	2nd	Bergantiños
2	2nd	Marino Luanco
3	2nd	Laredo
4	2nd	Sestao River
5	2nd	L'Hospitalet
6	2nd	La Nucía
7	2nd	Las Rozas
8	2nd	Gimnástica Segoviana
9	2nd	Linares
10	2nd	Ceuta
11	2nd	Mallorca B
12	2nd	Mensajero
13	2nd	Lorca Deportiva
14	2nd	Cacereño
15	2nd	Peña Sport
16	2nd	SD Logroñés
17	2nd	Illueca
18	2nd	Villarrubia

Group	Pos.	Team
1	3rd	Compostela
2	3rd	Caudal
3	3rd	Tropezón
4	3rd	Alavés B
5	3rd	Horta
6	3rd	Olímpic
7	3rd	Alcobendas Sport
8	3rd	Arandina
9	3rd	Antequera
10	3rd	Utrera
11	3rd	Poblense
12	3rd	Unión Viera
13	3rd	Lorca FC
14	3rd	Moralo
15	3rd	Mutilvera
16	3rd	Náxara
17	3rd	Deportivo Aragón
18	3rd	Villarrobledo

Group	Pos.	Team
1	4th	Alondras
2	4th	Covadonga
3	4th	Cayón
4	4th	San Ignacio
5	4th	Prat
6	4th	Atlético Saguntino
7	4th	Móstoles URJC
8	4th	Numancia B
9	4th	El Palo
10	4th	Algeciras
11	4th	Formentera
12	4th	Tenerife B
13	4th	Churra
14	4th	Coria
15	4th	Beti Kozkor
16	4th	UD Logroñés Promesas
17	4th	Sariñena
18	4th	Toledo

=== Matches ===
Team 1	Agg.	Team 2	1st leg	2nd leg
Tenerife B	1–2	Linares	1–0	0–2 (a.e.t.)
Alondras	2–1	Mensajero	1–0	1–1
El Palo	3–3 (a)	Illueca	2–0	1–3
Numancia B	3–0	Laredo	1–0	2–0
Churra	0–3	Gimnástica Segoviana	0–0	0–3
Cayón	1–2	SD Logroñés	1–1	0–1
Atlético Saguntino	2–3	Las Rozas	2–0	0–3
Covadonga	0–7	Bergantiños	0–2	0–5
San Ignacio	0–2	Marino Luanco	0–0	0–2
UD Logroñés Promesas	1–4	La Nucía	1–2	0–2
Formentera	2–2 (a)	Cacereño	0–0	2–2
Beti Kozkor	0–4	Mallorca B	0–0	0–4
Prat	3–2	Ceuta	2–1	1–1
Coria	1–2	Villarrubia	1–1	0–1
Móstoles URJC	2–0	Peña Sport	1–0	1–0
Algeciras	2–2 (a)	L'Hospitalet	1–0	1–2
Sariñena	1–3	Lorca Deportiva	1–0	0–3
Toledo	2–3	Sestao River	1–1	1–2
Mutilvera	1–1 (a)	Náxara	0–0	1–1
Deportivo Aragón	2–4	Arandina	2–1	0–3
Alcobendas Sport	3–2	Lorca FC	1–1	2–1
Unión Viera	1–1 (a)	Caudal	0–0	1–1
Moralo	1–0	Horta	0–0	1–0
Utrera	2–2 (a)	Antequera	1–0	1–2
Villarrobledo	4–1	Olímpic	1–1	3–0
Poblense	8–3	Tropezón	4–2	4–1
Alavés B	3–3 (a)	Compostela	1–0	2–3

=== Second round ===
==== Qualified teams ====
Group	Pos.	Team
2	1st	Lealtad
3	1st	Escobedo
4	1st	Portugalete
8	1st	Zamora
9	1st	Jaén
10	1st	Cádiz B
12	1st	Tamaraceite
17	1st	Tarazona
18	1st	Socuéllamos

Group	Pos.	Team
1	2nd	Bergantiños
2	2nd	Marino Luanco
4	2nd	Sestao River
6	2nd	La Nucía
7	2nd	Las Rozas
8	2nd	Gimnástica Segoviana
9	2nd	Linares
11	2nd	Mallorca B
13	2nd	Lorca Deportiva
16	2nd	SD Logroñés
18	2nd	Villarrubia

Group	Pos.	Team
4	3rd	Alavés B
7	3rd	Alcobendas Sport
8	3rd	Arandina
10	3rd	Utrera
11	3rd	Poblense
12	3rd	Unión Viera
14	3rd	Moralo
15	3rd	Mutilvera
18	3rd	Villarrobledo

Group	Pos.	Team
1	4th	Alondras
5	4th	Prat
7	4th	Móstoles URJC
8	4th	Numancia B
9	4th	El Palo
10	4th	Algeciras
11	4th	Formentera

=== Matches ===
Team 1	Agg.	Team 2	1st leg	2nd leg
Prat	1–0	Tamaraceite	0–0	1–0
Formentera	1–3	Lealtad	1–0	0–3
Móstoles URJC	0–3	Socuéllamos	0–1	0–2
El Palo	2–2 (a)	Tarazona	2–1	0–1
Numancia B	0–1	Cádiz B	0–0	0–1 (a.e.t.)
Algeciras	3–0	Jaén	1–0	2–0
Alondras	2–3	Portugalete	1–2	1–1
Alavés B	4–1	Escobedo	3–1	1–0
Alcobendas Sport	2–0	Zamora	2–0	0–0
Arandina	2–2 (a)	La Nucía	1–2	1–0
Poblense	2–4	Sestao River	1–1	1–3
Villarrobledo	3–1	Gimnástica Segoviana	2–1	1–0
Moralo	2–2 (4–5 p)	Linares	2–0	0–2
Mutilvera	0–2	Marino Luanco	0–0	0–2
Unión Viera	2–2 (a)	Lorca Deportiva	1–0	1–2
Utrera	1–2	Mallorca B	0–0	1–2
Las Rozas	1–1 (a)	SD Logroñés	0–0	1–1
Villarrubia	3–2	Bergantiños	2–0	1–2

=== Third round ===
==== Qualified teams ====
Group	Pos.	Team
2	1st	Lealtad
4	1st	Portugalete
10	1st	Cádiz B
17	1st	Tarazona
18	1st	Socuéllamos

Group	Pos.	Team
2	2nd	Marino Luanco
4	2nd	Sestao River
6	2nd	La Nucía
7	2nd	Las Rozas
9	2nd	Linares
11	2nd	Mallorca B
18	2nd	Villarrubia

Group	Pos.	Team
4	3rd	Alavés B
7	3rd	Alcobendas Sport
12	3rd	Unión Viera
18	3rd	Villarrobledo

Group	Pos.	Team
5	4th	Prat
10	4th	Algeciras

=== Matches ===
Team 1	Agg.	Team 2	1st leg	2nd leg
Algeciras	7–1	Socuéllamos	4–0	3–1
Prat	3–2	Portugalete	2–1	1–1
Villarrobledo	2–2 (a)	Lealtad	0–1	2–1
Alavés B	2–2 (a)	Tarazona	0–0	2–2
Unión Viera	0–4	Cádiz B	0–2	0–2
Alcobendas Sport	2–5	Villarrubia	2–3	0–2
Marino Luanco	1–0	Sestao River	0–0	1–0 (a.e.t.)
Linares	1–2	La Nucía	0–0	1–2
Las Rozas	2–1	Mallorca B	2–1	0–0

Promoted to Segunda División B
Alavés B (13 years later)	Algeciras (3 years later)	Cádiz B (first time ever)	La Nucía (first time ever)	Las Rozas (first time ever)	Marino Luanco (4 years later)	Prat (2 years later)	Villarrobledo (first time ever)	Villarrubia (first time ever)

== See also ==
- 2019 Segunda División play-offs
- 2019 Segunda División B play-offs
