= 2018–19 Tercera División =

Tercera División
- Season: 2018–19

The 2018–19 Tercera División was the fourth tier in Spanish football. It began in August 2018 and ended in late June 2019 with the promotion play-off finals.

== Competition format ==
- The top four eligible teams in each group would play the promotion playoffs.
- The champion of each group would qualify to 2019–20 Copa del Rey. If the champion is a reserve team, the first non-reserve team qualified would join the Copa.
- In each group, at least three teams would be relegated to Regional Divisions.

== Controversy in Group 8 ==
After being relegated, Real Burgos sued the Castile and León Football Federation arguing that the postponement of their match in the previous season against Arandina forced them to play three games in seven days with few rounds left, harming their performance and finishing the league in relegation positions.

Initially, they were admitted in Tercera División, in application of the precautionary measures by the Judgement, but later the Royal Spanish Football Federation revoked the decision commenting in a statement that the responsibility of organising the competition is theirs and not of the Regional federation.

== Group 1 – Galicia ==
=== Teams ===
Location of teams of the 2018–19 Tercera División Group 1
Teams in Ourense: Ourense CF, UD Ourense
Teams in A Laracha: Laracha, Paiosaco

Team	City	Home ground
Alondras	Cangas	O Morrazo
Arenteiro	O Carballiño	Espiñedo
Arosa	Vilagarcía de Arousa	A Lomba
Barco	O Barco de Valdeorras	Calabagueiros
Bergantiños	Carballo	As Eiroas
Boiro	Boiro	Barraña
Céltiga	A Illa de Arousa	Salvador Otero
Choco	Redondela	Santa Mariña
Compostela	Santiago de Compostela	Vero Boquete
Laracha	A Laracha	Municipal
Ourense CF	Ourense	O Couto
Paiosaco	A Laracha	Porta Santa
Porriño Industrial	O Porriño	Lourambal
Polvorín	Lugo	O Polvorín
Racing Ferrol	Ferrol	A Malata
Racing Villalbés	Vilalba	A Magdalena
Ribadumia	Ribadumia	A Senra
Silva	A Coruña	A Grela
Somozas	As Somozas	Pardiñas
UD Ourense	Ourense	O Couto

=== League table ===
Pos	Team	Pld	W	D	L	GF	GA	GD	Pts	Qualification or relegation
1	Racing Ferrol (C, P)	38	23	9	6	80	35	+45	78	Qualification to group champions' playoffs and Copa del Rey
2	Bergantiños	38	22	8	8	58	42	+16	74	Qualification to promotion playoffs and Copa del Rey
3	Compostela	38	20	8	10	80	47	+33	68	Qualification to promotion playoffs
4	Alondras	38	19	8	11	47	36	+11	65	Qualification to promotion playoffs
5	Barco	38	19	7	12	58	43	+15	64 (Note: Barco finished ahead of Ourense CF on head-to-head points: Ourense CF–Barco 1–2, Barco–Ourense CF 1–1)	
6	Ourense CF	38	18	10	10	51	24	+27	64	
7	Choco	38	16	11	11	59	47	+12	59 (Note: Choco finished ahead of UD Ourense on head-to-head points: Choco–UD Ourense 2–2, UD Ourense–Choco 0–3)	
8	UD Ourense	38	16	11	11	45	39	+6	59	
9	Arosa	38	17	6	15	57	44	+13	57	
10	Polvorín	38	15	7	16	55	53	+2	52 (Note: Polvorín finished ahead of Racing Villalbés on head-to-head points: Polvorín–Racing Villalbés 2–1, Racing Villalbés–Polvorín 0–1)	
11	Racing Villalbés	38	14	10	14	47	48	−1	52	
12	Silva	38	14	6	18	52	56	−4	48	
13	Arenteiro	38	12	11	15	41	53	−12	47	
14	Somozas	38	12	10	16	45	52	−7	46	
15	Paiosaco	38	12	9	17	46	59	−13	45	
16	Céltiga (Note: Relegated due to the relegations of regional teams from Segunda División B.) (R)	38	12	5	21	36	66	−30	41	Relegation to Preferente Autonómica (Note: Laracha, second reserve team of Deportivo La Coruña, relegated as Deportivo Fabril was dropped from Segunda División B.)
17	Laracha (R)	38	10	10	18	42	49	−7	40	Relegation to Preferente Autonómica
18	Ribadumia (R)	38	9	11	18	41	65	−24	38	Relegation to Preferente Autonómica
19	Boiro (R)	38	8	7	23	34	79	−45	31	Relegation to Preferente Autonómica
20	Porriño Industrial (R)	38	7	6	25	37	74	−37	27	Relegation to Preferente Autonómica

Rules for classification: 1) points; 2) head-to-head points; 3) head-to-head goal difference; 4) goal difference; 5) number of goals scored; 6) fair-play points; 7) playoff match
(C) Champions; (P) Promoted; (R) Relegated

=== Top goalscorers ===
Goalscorers	Goals	Team
(Spain) Pablo Rey	26	Racing Ferrol
(Senegal) Alassane Sylla	24	Arosa
(Spain) Aythami Perera	22	Compostela
(Spain) Rubén Rivera	20	Bergantiños
(Spain) Antón Escobar	20	Polvorín

== Group 2 – Asturias ==
=== Teams ===
Location of the 2018–19 Tercera División Group 2
Teams in Gijón: Ceares, Gijón Industrial
Teams in Oviedo: Covadonga, Universidad Oviedo

Team	City	Home ground
Avilés	Avilés	Román Suárez Puerta
Caudal	Mieres	Hermanos Antuña
Ceares	Gijón	La Cruz
Colunga	Colunga	Santianes
Condal	Noreña	Alejandro Ortea
Covadonga	Oviedo	Juan Antonio Álvarez Rabanal
Gijón Industrial	Gijón	Santa Cruz
L'Entregu	El Entrego, San Martín del Rey Aurelio	Nuevo Nalón
Lealtad	Villaviciosa	Les Caleyes
Llanera	Llanera	Pepe Quimarán
Llanes	Llanes	San José
Madalena de Morcín	Morcín	Santa Eulalia
Marino Luanco	Luanco, Gozón	Miramar
Mosconia	Grado	Marqués de la Vega de Anzo
Praviano	Pravia	Santa Catalina
San Claudio	San Claudio, Oviedo	José Ramón Suárez Fernández
San Martín	Sotrondio, San Martín del Rey Aurelio	El Florán
Siero	Pola de Siero, Siero	El Bayu
Tuilla	Tuilla, Langreo	El Candín
Universidad Oviedo	Oviedo	San Gregorio

=== League table ===
Pos	Team	Pld	W	D	L	GF	GA	GD	Pts	Qualification or relegation
1	Lealtad (C)	38	26	12	0	72	16	+56	90 (Note: Lealtad finished ahead of Marino Luanco on overall goal difference)	Qualification to group champions' playoffs and Copa del Rey
2	Marino Luanco (P)	38	27	9	2	77	22	+55	90	Qualification to promotion playoffs and Copa del Rey
3	Caudal	38	23	6	9	72	29	+43	75	Qualification to promotion playoffs
4	Covadonga	38	22	7	9	80	42	+38	73	Qualification to promotion playoffs
5	Llanera	38	21	7	10	65	42	+23	70	
6	Llanes	38	19	8	11	52	38	+14	65	
7	Tuilla	38	18	10	10	67	47	+20	64	
8	L'Entregu	38	16	9	13	42	36	+6	57	
9	Mosconia	38	16	7	15	51	42	+9	55	
10	Praviano	38	14	9	15	43	49	−6	51	
11	Condal	38	12	12	14	40	48	−8	48	
12	Colunga	38	12	8	18	38	48	−10	44 (Note: Colunga finished ahead of Ceares on head-to-head points: Ceares–Colunga 0–1, Colunga–Ceares 3–0)	
13	Ceares	38	10	14	14	35	51	−16	44	
14	Avilés	38	10	7	21	32	65	−33	37	
15	San Martín	38	9	9	20	35	53	−18	36 (Note: San Martín finished ahead of Siero on head-to-head goal differential: Siero–San Martín 1–0, San Martín–Siero 3–0)	
16	Siero	38	9	9	20	35	60	−25	36	
17	Gijón Industrial	38	9	8	21	38	64	−26	35	
18	Madalena de Morcín (R)	38	8	10	20	37	70	−33	34	Relegation to Regional Preferente
19	Universidad Oviedo (R)	38	7	9	22	30	61	−31	30	Relegation to Regional Preferente
20	San Claudio (R)	38	3	8	27	23	81	−58	17	Relegation to Regional Preferente

Source: Futbolme
Rules for classification: 1) points; 2) head-to-head points; 3) head-to-head goal difference; 4) goal difference; 5) number of goals scored; 6) fair-play points; 7) playoff match
(C) Champions; (P) Promoted; (R) Relegated

=== Top goalscorers ===
Goalscorers	Goals	Team
(Spain) Jaime Álvarez	21	Covadonga
(Uruguay) Germán Fassani	20	Marino Luanco
(Spain) Cristian García	18	Caudal
(Senegal) Cheikh Saha	17	Lealtad
(Spain) Jorge Fernández	15	Lealtad

== Group 3 – Cantabria ==
=== Teams ===
Location of teams of the 2018–19 Tercera División Group III
Teams in Santander: Racing Santander B, Atlético Albericia
Teams in Torrelavega: Barreda, Tropezón

Team	City	Home ground
Atético Albericia	Santander	Juan Hormaechea
Barreda	Barreda, Torrelavega	Solvay
Bezana	Santa Cruz de Bezana	Municipal
Cayón	Sarón, Santa María de Cayón	Fernando Astobiza
Escobedo	Escobedo, Camargo	Eusebio Arce
Guarnizo	Guarnizo, El Astillero	El Pilar
Laredo	Laredo	San Lorenzo
Naval	Reinosa	San Francisco
Racing Santander B	Santander	La Albericia
Revilla	Revilla, Camargo	El Crucero
Ribamontán al Mar	Ribamontán al Mar	Baceñuela
Rinconeda Polanco	Polanco	Municipal
Sámano	Sámano, Castro Urdiales	Vallegón
Siete Villas	Castillo, Arnuero	San Pedro
Solares-Medio Cudeyo	Solares, Medio Cudeyo	La Estación
Textil Escudo	Cabezón de la Sal	Municipal
Torina	Bárcena de Pie de Concha	Municipal
Tropezón	Tanos, Torrelavega	Santa Ana
Velarde	Muriedas, Camargo	La Maruca
Vimenor	Vioño de Piélagos, Piélagos	La Vidriera

=== League table ===
Pos	Team	Pld	W	D	L	GF	GA	GD	Pts	Qualification or relegation
1	Escobedo (C)	38	25	11	2	80	29	+51	86	Qualification to group champions' playoffs and Copa del Rey
2	Laredo	38	24	8	6	71	26	+45	80	Qualification to promotion playoffs and Copa del Rey
3	Tropezón	38	22	10	6	73	34	+39	76	Qualification to promotion playoffs
4	Cayón	38	22	8	8	66	26	+40	74	Qualification to promotion playoffs
5	Racing Santander B	38	17	17	4	62	24	+38	68	
6	Bezana	38	19	8	11	60	50	+10	65	
7	Sámano	38	17	7	14	54	46	+8	58	
8	Vimenor	38	15	9	14	51	56	−5	54	
9	Torina	38	15	8	15	55	60	−5	53	
10	Textil Escudo	38	15	6	17	49	43	+6	51	
11	Ribamontán al Mar	38	13	11	14	36	38	−2	50	
12	Barreda	38	13	8	17	48	59	−11	47	
13	Siete Villas	38	10	13	15	41	51	−10	43	
14	Atlético Albericia	38	10	12	16	43	47	−4	42 (Note: Atlético Albericia finished ahead of Solares-Medio Cudeyo on overall goal difference)	
15	Solares-Medio Cudeyo (Note: Solares-Medio Cudeyo docked 1 point for fielding an ineligible player in their match against Revilla. The match originally finished in a 2–2 draw. Revilla was awarded the match 3–0.)	38	9	15	14	33	44	−11	42	
16	Guarnizo	38	11	7	20	41	54	−13	40	
17	Revilla (Note: Relegated due to the relegations of regional teams from Segunda División B.) (R)	38	10	8	20	48	83	−35	38	Relegation to Regional Preferente
18	Velarde (R)	38	10	6	22	35	67	−32	36	Relegation to Regional Preferente
19	Naval (R)	38	5	8	25	36	95	−59	23	Relegation to Regional Preferente
20	Rinconeda Polanco (R)	38	3	10	25	37	87	−50	19	Relegation to Regional Preferente

Rules for classification: 1) points; 2) head-to-head points; 3) head-to-head goal difference; 4) goal difference; 5) number of goals scored; 6) fair-play points; 7) playoff match
(C) Champions; (R) Relegated

=== Top goalscorers ===
Goalscorers	Goals	Team
(Spain) Alberto Dorronsoro	31	Cayón
(Spain) Iván Argos	25	Laredo
(Spain) Juan Fresno	21	Tropezón
(Spain) Carlos Gallo	19	Torina
(Spain) Javier Siverio	16	Racing Santander B

== Group 4 – Basque Country ==
=== Teams ===
Location of teams of the 2018–19 Tercera División Group IV
Teams in Sestao: San Pedro, Sestao River
Teams in Bilbao: Basconia, Santutxu

Team	City	Home ground
Alavés B	Vitoria-Gasteiz	Ibaia
Amurrio	Amurrio	Basarte
Balmaseda	Balmaseda	La Baluga
Basconia	Basauri	López Cortázar
Beasain	Beasain	Loinaz
Bermeo	Bermeo	Itxas Gane
Deusto	Bilbao	Etxezuri
Lagun Onak	Azpeitia	Garmendipe
Ordizia	Ordizia	Altamira
Pasaia	Pasaia	Don Bosco
Portugalete	Portugalete	La Florida
Real Sociedad C	San Sebastián	Berio
San Ignacio	Vitoria-Gasteiz	Adurtzabal
San Pedro	Sestao	Las Llanas
Santurtzi	Santurtzi	San Jorge
Santutxu	Bilbao	Maiona
Sestao River	Sestao	Las Llanas
Sodupe	Güeñes	Lorenzo Hurtado de Saratxo
Somorrostro	Muskiz	El Malecón
Zamudio	Zamudio	Gazituaga

=== League table ===
Pos	Team	Pld	W	D	L	GF	GA	GD	Pts	Qualification or relegation
1	Portugalete (C)	38	26	8	4	65	21	+44	86	Qualification to group champions' playoffs and Copa del Rey
2	Sestao River	38	22	12	4	74	36	+38	78	Qualification to promotion playoffs and Copa del Rey
3	Alavés B (P)	38	18	12	8	69	44	+25	66	Qualification to promotion playoffs
4	San Ignacio	38	17	12	9	66	36	+30	63 (Note: San Ignacio finished ahead of Balmaseda on overall goal difference)	Qualification to promotion playoffs
5	Balmaseda	38	17	12	9	50	36	+14	63	
6	Basconia	38	16	12	10	64	52	+12	60	
7	Real Sociedad C	38	16	11	11	71	48	+23	59	
8	Somorrostro	38	14	15	9	59	43	+16	57	
9	Sodupe	38	11	17	10	49	45	+4	50	
10	Pasaia	38	12	13	13	33	46	−13	49	
11	Santutxu	38	12	12	14	38	48	−10	48 (Note: Santutxu finished ahead of Lagun Onak on head-to-head goal differential: Lagun Onak–Santutxu 1–0, Santutxu–Lagun Onak 2–0)	
12	Lagun Onak	38	12	12	14	46	46	0	48	
13	Beasain	38	9	19	10	46	40	+6	46	
14	Santurtzi	38	10	15	13	33	42	−9	45	
15	Deusto	38	10	13	15	41	55	−14	43	
16	Zamudio (Note: Relegated due to the relegations of regional teams from Segunda División B.) (R)	38	10	9	19	42	66	−24	39	Relegation to Regional leagues
17	Amurrio (R)	38	8	10	20	30	64	−34	34	Relegation to Regional leagues
18	Ordizia (R)	38	5	16	17	40	72	−32	31	Relegation to Regional leagues
19	San Pedro (R)	38	6	11	21	40	69	−29	29	Relegation to Regional leagues
20	Bermeo (R)	38	2	13	23	24	71	−47	19	Relegation to Regional leagues

Rules for classification: 1) points; 2) head-to-head points; 3) head-to-head goal difference; 4) goal difference; 5) number of goals scored; 6) fair-play points; 7) playoff match
(C) Champions; (P) Promoted; (R) Relegated

=== Top goalscorers ===
Goalscorers	Goals	Team
(Spain) Iñigo Pisón	21	Sodupe
(Romania) Andrei Lupu	18	Alavés B
(Spain) Óscar Martín	17	Sestao River
(Spain) Jon Orbegozo	15	Lagun Onak
(Spain) Ewan Urain	14	Basconia

== Group 5 – Catalonia ==
=== Teams ===
Location of teams of the 2018–19 Tercera División Group 5
Location of teams of the 2018–19 Tercera División Group 5 in the province of Barcelona
Teams in Terrassa: San Cristóbal, Terrassa

Team	City	Home ground
Ascó	Ascó	Municipal
Castelldefels	Castelldefels	El Canyar
Cerdanyola del Vallès	Cerdanyola del Vallès	La Bòbila-Pinetons
Europa	Barcelona	Nou Sardenya
Figueres	Figueres	Vilatenim
Grama	Santa Coloma de Gramenet	Nou Municipal
Granollers	Granollers	Carrer Girona
Horta	Barcelona	Feliu i Codina
L'Hospitalet	L'Hospitalet de Llobregat	La Feixa Llarga
Llagostera	Llagostera	Municipal
Martinenc	Barcelona	Guinardó
Pobla de Mafumet	La Pobla de Mafumet	Municipal
Prat	El Prat de Llobregat	Sagnier
Reus B	Cambrils	Municipal
San Cristóbal	Terrassa	Ca n'Anglada
Sant Andreu	Barcelona	Narcís Sala
Santboià	Sant Boi de Llobregat	Joan Baptista Milà
Santfeliuenc	Sant Feliu de Llobregat	Les Grases
Sants	Barcelona	La Magòria
Terrassa	Terrassa	Olímpic
Vilafranca	Vilafranca del Penedès	Municipal

=== League table ===
Pos	Team	Pld	W	D	L	GF	GA	GD	Pts	Qualification or relegation
1	Llagostera (C, P)	40	25	8	7	75	31	+44	83	Qualification to group champions' playoffs and Copa del Rey
2	L'Hospitalet	40	24	8	8	71	31	+40	80	Qualification to promotion playoffs and Copa del Rey
3	Horta	40	23	10	7	57	32	+25	79	Qualification to promotion playoffs
4	Prat (P)	40	21	12	7	51	22	+29	75	Qualification to promotion playoffs
5	Sant Andreu	40	20	11	9	65	34	+31	71	
6	Europa	40	17	12	11	53	41	+12	63 (Note: Europa finished ahead of Reus B and Terrassa on head-to-head points: Europa 10 pts, Reus B 4 pts, Terrassa 2 pts)	
7	Reus B (Note: Relegated due to administrative demotion of Reus.) (R)	40	17	12	11	58	41	+17	63	Relegation to Primera Catalana
8	Terrassa	40	17	12	11	52	45	+7	63	
9	Vilafranca	40	18	8	14	53	42	+11	62	
10	Granollers	40	16	13	11	54	42	+12	61	
11	Cerdanyola del Vallès	40	12	14	14	40	46	−6	50	
12	Figueres	40	12	13	15	36	46	−10	49 (Note: Figueres finished ahead of Santfeliuenc on head-to-head points: Santfeliuenc–Figueres 3–4, Figueres–Santfeliuenc 2–1)	
13	Santfeliuenc	40	13	10	17	56	58	−2	49	
14	Pobla de Mafumet	40	12	12	16	44	46	−2	48 (Note: Pobla de Mafumet finished ahead of San Cristóbal on overall goal difference)	
15	San Cristóbal	40	14	6	20	52	70	−18	48	
16	Castelldefels	40	11	10	19	39	56	−17	43 (Note: Castelldefels finished ahead of Sants on head-to-head goal differential: Castelldefels–Sants 1–2, Sants–Castelldefels 0–2)	
17	Sants	40	12	7	21	37	56	−19	43	
18	Grama (R)	40	7	12	21	30	57	−27	33	Relegation to Primera Catalana
19	Santboià (R)	40	8	7	25	24	66	−42	31	Relegation to Primera Catalana
20	Ascó (R)	40	7	9	24	31	65	−34	30	Relegation to Primera Catalana
21	Martinenc (R)	40	4	14	22	34	85	−51	26	Relegation to Primera Catalana

Rules for classification: 1) points; 2) head-to-head points; 3) head-to-head goal difference; 4) goal difference; 5) number of goals scored; 6) fair-play points; 7) playoff match
(C) Champions; (P) Promoted; (R) Relegated

=== Top goalscorers ===
Goalscorers	Goals	Team
(Spain) Manuel Salinas	24	L'Hospitalet
(Spain) Sergi Arranz	17	Terrassa
(Spain) Carlos Cano	15	Cerdanyola del Vallès
(Spain) Sascha Andreu	14	Llagostera
(Spain) Josu Rodríguez	13	Sant Andreu

== Group 6 – Valencian Community ==
=== Teams ===
Location of teams of the 2018–19 Tercera División Group 6

Team	City	Home ground
Acero	Sagunto	El Fornàs
Alzira	Alzira	Luis Suñer Picó
Atlético Saguntino	Sagunto	Morvedre
Atzeneta	Atzeneta d'Albaida	El Regit
Crevillente	Crevillent	Enrique Miralles
Elche CF Ilicitano	Elche	José Díaz Iborra
Eldense	Elda	Nuevo Pepico Amat
Jove Español	San Vicente del Raspeig	Ciudad Deportiva
La Nucía	La Nucía	Camilo Cano
Novelda	Novelda	La Magdalena
Olímpic	Xàtiva	La Murta
Orihuela	Orihuela	Los Arcos
Paiporta	Paiporta	El Palleter
Paterna	Paterna	Gerardo Salvador
Rayo Ibense	Ibi	Francisco Vilaplana Mariel
Roda	Castelló de la Plana	Pamesa Cerámica
Silla	Silla	Vicente Morera
Torre Levante	Valencia	Orriols
Vilamarxant	Vilamarxant	Hermanos Albiol
Villarreal C	Villarreal	Pamesa Cerámica

=== League table ===
Pos	Team	Pld	W	D	L	GF	GA	GD	Pts	Qualification or relegation
1	Orihuela (C, P)	38	26	8	4	62	21	+41	86	Qualification to group champions' playoffs and Copa del Rey
2	La Nucía (P)	38	19	13	6	53	25	+28	70	Qualification to promotion playoffs
3	Olímpic	38	19	12	7	52	29	+23	69	Qualification to promotion playoffs
4	Atlético Saguntino	38	18	12	8	47	27	+20	66	Qualification to promotion playoffs
5	Crevillente	38	18	11	9	47	34	+13	65	
6	Atzeneta	38	16	10	12	48	42	+6	58	
7	Jove Español	38	15	10	13	41	44	−3	55	
8	Roda	38	13	15	10	44	42	+2	54	
9	Eldense	38	14	11	13	47	48	−1	53	
10	Villarreal C	38	15	7	16	52	44	+8	52	
11	Vilamarxant	38	13	11	14	52	49	+3	50	
12	Silla	38	13	9	16	40	44	−4	48	
13	Paterna	38	13	7	18	42	51	−9	46	
14	Alzira	38	11	10	17	33	52	−19	43 (Note: Alzira finished ahead of Novelda on head-to-head points: Alzira–Novelda 0–0, Novelda–Alzira 1–2)	
15	Novelda	38	10	13	15	45	51	−6	43	
16	Elche Ilicitano	38	9	14	15	42	47	−5	41	
17	Acero	38	9	12	17	45	53	−8	39 (Note: Acero finished ahead of Rayo Ibense on head-to-head points: Rayo Ibense–Acero 0–1, Acero–Rayo Ibense 4–1)	
18	Rayo Ibense (R)	38	9	12	17	39	53	−14	39	Relegation to Regional Preferente
19	Torre Levante (R)	38	8	12	18	28	48	−20	36	Relegation to Regional Preferente
20	Paiporta (R)	38	4	7	27	30	85	−55	19	Relegation to Regional Preferente

Rules for classification: 1) points; 2) head-to-head points; 3) head-to-head goal difference; 4) goal difference; 5) number of goals scored; 6) fair-play points; 7) playoff match
(C) Champions; (P) Promoted; (R) Relegated

=== Top goalscorers ===
Goalscorers	Goals	Team
(Spain) Chico	23	Atzeneta
(Spain) Rubén Solano	16	Olímpic
(Spain) Álex Millán	16	Villarreal C
(Spain) Fofo	14	La Nucía
(Spain) Jaime Jornet	14	Olímpic

== Group 7 – Community of Madrid ==
=== Teams ===
Location of teams of the 2018–19 Tercera División Group 7
Teams in Alcorcón: Alcorcón B, Trival Valderas

Team	City	Home ground
Alcalá	Alcalá de Henares	Municipal del Val
Alcobendas Sport	Alcobendas	Luis Aragonés
Alcorcón B	Alcorcón	Anexo de Santo DomingoRuiz
Atlético Pinto	Pinto	Amelia del Castillo
Canillas	Madrid	Canillas
Carabanchel	Madrid	La Mina
Getafe B	Getafe	Ciudad Deportiva
Las Rozas	Las Rozas	Navalcarbón
Leganés B	Leganés	Anexo de Butarque
Móstoles URJC	Móstoles	El Soto
Parla	Parla	Los Prados
Pozuelo de Alarcón	Pozuelo de Alarcón	Valle de las Cañas
Rayo Vallecano B	Madrid	Ciudad Deportiva
San Agustín del Guadalix	San Agustín del Guadalix	Municipal
San Fernando de Henares	San Fernando de Henares	Santiago del Pino
Santa Ana	Madrid	Santa Ana
Tres Cantos	Tres Cantos	La Foresta
Trival Valderas	Alcorcón	La Canaleja
Vicálvaro	Madrid	Municipal
Villaverde San Andrés	Madrid	Boetticher

=== League table ===
Pos	Team	Pld	W	D	L	GF	GA	GD	Pts	Qualification or relegation
1	Getafe B (C, P)	38	25	8	5	58	24	+34	83	Qualification to group champions' playoffs
2	Las Rozas (P)	38	24	7	7	69	34	+35	79	Qualification to promotion playoffs and Copa del Rey
3	Alcobendas Sport	38	21	9	8	49	29	+20	72	Qualification to promotion playoffs
4	Móstoles URJC	38	21	8	9	41	25	+16	71	Qualification to promotion playoffs
5	Villaverde San Andrés	38	18	9	11	40	31	+9	63	
6	Trival Valderas	38	16	11	11	41	32	+9	59 (Note: Trival Valderas finished ahead of Rayo Vallecano B on head-to-head points: Trival Valderas–Rayo Vallecano B 2–0, Rayo Vallecano B–Trival Valderas 1–1)	
7	Rayo Vallecano B	38	16	11	11	58	47	+11	59	
8	San Fernando de Henares	38	15	13	10	44	37	+7	58	
9	Leganés B	38	15	10	13	51	39	+12	55	
10	Atlético Pinto	38	14	9	15	41	51	−10	51	
11	Santa Ana	38	13	8	17	51	48	+3	47	
12	Alcorcón B	38	11	11	16	26	35	−9	44 (Note: Alcorcón B finished ahead of Carabanchel and Alcalá on head-to-head points: Alcorcón B 9 pts, Carabanchel 4 pts, Alcalá 4 pts. Alcalá finished ahead of Carabanchel on head-to-head points: Carabanchel–Alcalá 0–0, Alcalá–Carabanchel 1–0)	
13	Alcalá	38	10	14	14	25	31	−6	44	
14	Carabanchel	38	11	11	16	29	37	−8	44	
15	Parla	38	11	10	17	39	49	−10	43	
16	Pozuelo de Alarcón	38	11	7	20	38	52	−14	40	
17	Canillas (R)	38	9	12	17	34	52	−18	39	Relegation to Preferente
18	Vicálvaro (R)	38	8	10	20	37	58	−21	34	Relegation to Preferente
19	San Agustín del Guadalix (R)	38	6	11	21	37	61	−24	29	Relegation to Preferente
20	Tres Cantos (R)	38	6	9	23	19	55	−36	27	Relegation to Preferente

Rules for classification: 1) points; 2) head-to-head points; 3) head-to-head goal difference; 4) goal difference; 5) number of goals scored; 6) fair-play points; 7) playoff match
(C) Champions; (P) Promoted; (R) Relegated

=== Top goalscorers ===
Goalscorers	Goals	Team
(Spain) Álvaro Portero	22	Santa Ana
(Spain) Adrián Carrasco	18	Rayo Vallecano B
(Spain) Rubén Blanco	17	Las Rozas
(Spain) Albur	14	Las Rozas
(Spain) David Barca	13	Alcobendas Sport

== Group 8 – Castile and León ==
=== Teams ===
Location of teams of the 2018–19 Tercera División Group 8
Teams in Burgos: Bupolsa, Burgos Promesas

Team	City	Home ground
Almazán	Almazán	La Arboleda
Arandina	Aranda de Duero	El Montecillo
Atlético Astorga	Astorga	La Eragudina
Atlético Bembibre	Bembibre	La Devesa
Atlético Tordesillas	Tordesillas	Las Salinas
Ávila	Ávila	Adolfo Suárez
Briviesca	Briviesca	Municipal
Bupolsa	Burgos	San Amaro
Burgos Promesas	Burgos	Castañares
Cebrereña	Cebreros	El Mancho
Cristo Atlético	Palencia	Nueva Balastera
Gimnástica Segoviana	Segovia	La Albuera
Júpiter Leonés	León	Puente Castro
La Bañeza	La Bañeza	La Llanera
La Granja	San Ildefonso	El Hospital
La Virgen del Camino	La Virgen del Camino	Los Dominicos
Numancia B	Soria	Francisco Rubio
Santa Marta	Santa Marta de Tormes	Alfonso San Casto
Sporting Uxama	El Burgo de Osma	Municipal
Zamora	Zamora	Ruta de la Plata

=== League table ===
Pos	Team	Pld	W	D	L	GF	GA	GD	Pts	Qualification or relegation
1	Zamora (C)	38	27	9	2	94	22	+72	90	Qualification to group champions' playoffs and Copa del Rey
2	Gimnástica Segoviana	38	26	9	3	77	24	+53	87	Qualification to promotion playoffs and Copa del Rey
3	Arandina	38	24	11	3	71	16	+55	83	Qualification to promotion playoffs
4	Numancia B	38	24	8	6	69	25	+44	80	Qualification to promotion playoffs
5	Atlético Astorga	38	24	5	9	86	35	+51	77	
6	Ávila	38	19	11	8	53	32	+21	68	
7	Cristo Atlético	38	18	4	16	61	55	+6	58	
8	Júpiter Leonés	38	16	9	13	57	47	+10	57	
9	La Virgen del Camino	38	16	6	16	41	55	−14	54 (Note: La Virgen del Camino finished ahead of Burgos Promesas on head-to-head points: Burgos Promesas–La Virgen del Camino 1–3, La Virgen del Camino–Burgos Promesas 2–1)	
10	Burgos Promesas	38	14	12	12	42	43	−1	54	
11	Atlético Tordesillas	38	15	8	15	41	45	−4	53	
12	Almazán	38	13	10	15	49	56	−7	49	
13	Santa Marta	38	9	10	19	36	58	−22	37	
14	Atlético Bembibre	38	6	17	15	27	46	−19	35	
15	La Bañeza	38	8	10	20	38	72	−34	34	
16	Bupolsa	38	7	11	20	36	59	−23	32	
17	La Granja	38	6	10	22	35	81	−46	28	
18	Briviesca (R)	38	4	15	19	28	68	−40	27	Relegation to Primera Regional
19	Cebrereña (R)	38	4	13	21	29	65	−36	25	Relegation to Primera Regional
20	Sporting Uxama (R)	38	4	5	29	24	90	−66	17	Relegation to Primera Regional

Rules for classification: 1) points; 2) head-to-head points; 3) head-to-head goal difference; 4) goal difference; 5) number of goals scored; 6) fair-play points; 7) playoff match
(C) Champions; (R) Relegated

=== Top goalscorers ===
Goalscorers	Goals	Team
(Spain) Roberto García	29	Atlético Astorga
(Spain) Mika Junco	25	Gimnástica Segoviana
(Spain) Murci	22	Zamora
(Spain) David Álvarez	20	Zamora
(Spain) Borja Rubiato	20	Arandina

== Group 9 – Eastern Andalusia and Melilla ==
=== Teams ===
Location of teams of the 2018–19 Tercera División Group 9

Team	City	Home ground
Alhaurín de la Torre	Alhaurín de la Torre	Los Manantiales
Alhaurino	Alhaurín El Grande	Miguel Fijones
Antequera	Antequera	El Maulí
Atarfe Industrial	Atarfe	Municipal
Atlético Mancha Real	Mancha Real	La Juventud
Ciudad de Torredonjimeno	Torredonjimeno	Matías Prats
El Palo	Málaga	San Ignacio
Guadix	Guadix	Municipal
Huétor Tájar	Huétor-Tájar	Miguel Moranto
Huétor Vega	Huétor Vega	Las Viñas
Jaén	Jaén	La Victoria
Juventud Torremolinos	Torremolinos	El Pozuelo
Linares	Linares	Linarejos
Loja	Loja	Medina Lauxa
Martos	Martos	Ciudad de Martos
Motril	Motril	Escribano Castilla
Polideportivo Almería	Almería	Juventud Campra
River Melilla	Melilla	La Espiguera
Rincón	Rincón de la Victoria	Francisco Romero
San Pedro	San Pedro de Alcántara	Municipal
Torreperogil	Torreperogil	Municipal
Vélez	Vélez-Málaga	Vivar Téllez

=== League table ===
Pos	Team	Pld	W	D	L	GF	GA	GD	Pts	Qualification or relegation
1	Jaén (C)	42	32	5	5	99	32	+67	101	Qualification to group champions' playoffs and Copa del Rey
2	Linares	42	28	6	8	80	31	+49	90	Qualification to promotion playoffs and Copa del Rey
3	Antequera	42	24	10	8	90	35	+55	82	Qualification to promotion playoffs
4	El Palo	42	24	9	9	65	34	+31	81	Qualification to promotion playoffs
5	Vélez	42	18	14	10	56	40	+16	68 (Note: Vélez finished ahead of Motril on head-to-head goal differential: Motril–Vélez 3–2, Vélez–Motril 4–0)	
6	Motril	42	20	8	14	79	59	+20	68	
7	Loja	42	18	8	16	68	64	+4	62	
8	Atlético Mancha Real	42	16	12	14	59	52	+7	60	
9	Ciudad de Torredonjimeno	42	16	10	16	74	59	+15	58 (Note: Ciudad de Torredonjimeno finished ahead of Torreperogil on overall goal difference)	
10	Torreperogil	42	16	10	16	43	52	−9	58	
11	Huétor Tájar	42	15	12	15	65	55	+10	57 (Note: Huétor Tájar and Huétor Vega finished ahead of Polideportivo Almería on head-to-head points: Huétor Tájar 6 pts, Huétor Vega 6 pts, Polideportivo Almería 2 pts. Huétor Tájar finished ahead of Huétor Vega on overall goal difference.)	
12	Huétor Vega	42	16	9	17	56	65	−9	57	
13	Polideportivo Almería	42	15	12	15	53	57	−4	57	
14	Alhaurín de la Torre	42	15	11	16	72	70	+2	56 (Note: Alhaurín de la Torre finished ahead of Alhaurino on head-to-head points: Alhaurino–Alhaurín de la Torre 1–2, Alhaurín de la Torre–Alhaurino 1–1)	
15	Alhaurino (Note: Relegated due to the relegations of regional teams from Segunda División B.) (R)	42	14	14	14	72	66	+6	56	Relegation to División de Honor
16	Juventud Torremolinos (R)	42	15	8	19	57	65	−8	53	Relegation to División de Honor
17	Rincón (R)	42	14	10	18	45	63	−18	52	Relegation to División de Honor
18	Martos (R)	42	12	8	22	41	70	−29	44	Relegation to División de Honor
19	Atarfe Industrial (Note: Atarfe Industrial docked three points for fielding an ineligible player in their match against Torreperogil. The match was originally won by Atarfe Industrial 4–2) (R)	42	12	6	24	49	79	−30	42	Relegation to División de Honor
20	San Pedro (R)	42	11	8	23	48	75	−27	41	Relegation to División de Honor
21	Guadix (R)	42	8	11	23	44	95	−51	35	Relegation to División de Honor
22	River Melilla (Note: River Melilla docked three points for failing to show up for an away match against Linares. The RFEF awarded the match to Linares 3–0) (R)	42	2	1	39	28	125	−97	4	Relegation to División de Honor

Rules for classification: 1) points; 2) head-to-head points; 3) head-to-head goal difference; 4) goal difference; 5) number of goals scored; 6) fair-play points; 7) playoff match
(C) Champions; (R) Relegated

=== Top goalscorers ===
Goalscorers	Goals	Team
(Spain) Antonio López	31	Jaén
(Spain) Chendo	22	Linares
(Spain) Iván Aguilar	20	Antequera
(Spain) Víctor Rueda	20	Alhaurino
(Spain) Kike Morales	19	Alhaurín de la Torre

== Group 10 – Western Andalusia and Ceuta ==
=== Teams ===
Location of teams of the 2018–19 Tercera División Group 10
Teams in Seville: Betis Deportivo, Sevilla C
Teams in Jerez de la Frontera: Guadalcacín, Xerez, Xerez Deportivo

Team	City	Home ground
Algeciras	Algeciras	Nuevo Mirador
Arcos	Arcos de la Frontera	Antonio Barbadillo
Atlético Espeleño	Espiel	Municipal
Betis Deportivo	Seville	Ciudad Deportiva Luis del Sol
Cabecense	Las Cabezas de San Juan	Carlos Marchena
Cádiz B	Cádiz	Puntales
Ceuta	Ceuta	Alfonso Murube
Ciudad de Lucena	Lucena	Ciudad Deportiva
Conil	Conil de la Frontera	José Antonio Pérez Ureba
Córdoba B	Córdoba	Rafael Gómez
Coria	Coria del Río	Guadalquivir
Écija	Écija	San Pablo
Gerena	Gerena	José Juan Romero Gil
Guadalcacín	Jerez de la Frontera	Municipal
Lebrijana	Lebrija	Polideportivo Municipal
Los Barrios	Los Barrios	San Rafael
San Fermín	Puente Genil	Manuel Polinario
San Roque de Lepe	Lepe	Ciudad de Lepe
Sevilla C	Seville	José Ramón Cisneros
Utrera	Utrera	San Juan Bosco
Xerez	Jerez de la Frontera	La Juventud
Xerez Deportivo	Jerez de la Frontera	Chapín

=== League table ===
Pos	Team	Pld	W	D	L	GF	GA	GD	Pts	Qualification or relegation
1	Cádiz B (C, P)	42	23	14	5	48	18	+30	83	Qualification to group champions' playoffs
2	Ceuta	42	24	8	10	68	42	+26	80	Qualification to promotion playoffs and Copa del Rey
3	Utrera	42	22	13	7	59	29	+30	79	Qualification to promotion playoffs
4	Algeciras (P)	42	22	11	9	64	35	+29	77 (Note: Algeciras finished ahead of Xerez Deportivo on head-to-head points: Algeciras–Xerez Deportivo 1–0, Xerez Deportivo–Algeciras 0–0)	Qualification to promotion playoffs
5	Xerez Deportivo	42	20	17	5	49	24	+25	77	
6	Betis Deportivo	42	23	7	12	93	40	+53	76 (Note: Betis Deportivo finished ahead of Los Barrios on head-to-head goal differential: Betis Deportivo–Los Barrios 7–0, Los Barrios–Betis Deportivo 2–1)	
7	Los Barrios	42	21	13	8	64	43	+21	76	
8	Córdoba B	42	19	14	9	67	39	+28	71	
9	Ciudad de Lucena	42	16	10	16	56	53	+3	58	
10	Xerez	42	13	18	11	45	42	+3	57	
11	Puente Genil	42	12	19	11	52	49	+3	55	
12	Lebrijana	42	14	10	18	47	65	−18	52	
13	Coria	42	13	12	17	53	52	+1	51	
14	Gerena	42	13	11	18	43	68	−25	50 (Note: Gerena finished ahead of Sevilla C on head-to-head points: Gerena–Sevilla C 2–1, Sevilla C–Gerena 0–0)	
15	Sevilla C	42	14	8	20	39	49	−10	50	
16	San Roque de Lepe	42	13	10	19	52	61	−9	49 (Note: San Roque de Lepe finished ahead of Conil and Arcos on head-to-head points: San Roque de Lepe 9 pts, Conil 5 pts, Arcos 2 pts)	
17	Conil	42	11	16	15	47	55	−8	49	
18	Arcos	42	13	10	19	45	53	−8	49	
19	Écija	42	13	9	20	37	48	−11	48	
20	Cabecense (R)	42	7	9	26	39	80	−41	30	Relegation to División de Honor
21	Atlético Espeleño (R)	42	7	8	27	45	91	−46	29	Relegation to División de Honor
22	Guadalcacín (Note: Guadalcacín docked three points for fielding an ineligible player in their match against Coria. The match originally ended in a 1–1 draw.) (R)	42	3	5	34	21	97	−76	14	Relegation to División de Honor

Rules for classification: 1) points; 2) head-to-head points; 3) head-to-head goal difference; 4) goal difference; 5) number of goals scored; 6) fair-play points; 7) playoff match
(C) Champions; (P) Promoted; (R) Relegated

=== Top goalscorers ===
Goalscorers	Goals	Team
(Spain) Javier Forján	25	Los Barrios
(Spain) Chuma	21	Córdoba B
(Spain) José Antonio Prieto	17	Ceuta
(Spain) Adrián Gallardo	17	Xerez Deportivo
(Spain) Rober González	17	Betis Deportivo

== Group 11 – Balearic Islands ==
=== Teams ===
Location of teams of the 2018–19 Tercera División Group 11
Teams in Palma: Mallorca B, Santa Catalina Atlético, Son Cladera

Team	City	Home ground
Alcúdia	Alcúdia	Els Arcs
Binissalem	Binissalem	Miquel Pons
Constància	Inca	Municipal
Esporles	Esporles	Son Quint
Felanitx	Felanitx	Es Torrentó
Ferriolense	Son Ferriol	Municipal
Formentera	Sant Francesc Xavier	Municipal
Ibiza Islas Pitiusas	Ibiza	Can Misses
Llosetense	Lloseta	Municipal
Mallorca B	Palma	Son Bibiloni
Manacor	Manacor	Na Capellera
Mercadal	Es Mercadal	San Martí
Murense	Muro	Municipal
Platges de Calvià	Magaluf	Municipal de Magaluf
Peña Deportiva	Santa Eulària des Riu	Municipal
Poblense	Sa Pobla	Nou Camp
Sant Rafel	Sant Rafel	Municipal
Santa Catalina Atlético	Palma	Son Flo
Santanyí	Santanyí	Municipal
Sóller	Sóller	En Maiol
Son Cladera	Palma	Son Cladera

=== League table ===
Pos	Team	Pld	W	D	L	GF	GA	GD	Pts	Qualification or relegation
1	Peña Deportiva (C, P)	40	31	5	4	88	28	+60	98	Qualification to group champions' playoffs and Copa del Rey
2	Mallorca B	40	28	6	6	92	31	+61	90	Qualification to promotion playoffs
3	Poblense	40	26	8	6	93	33	+60	86	Qualification to promotion playoffs and Copa del Rey
4	Formentera	40	25	10	5	70	28	+42	85	Qualification to promotion playoffs
5	Ibiza Islas Pitiusas	40	25	8	7	75	28	+47	83	
6	Platges de Calvià	40	21	9	10	51	30	+21	72	
7	Alcúdia	40	20	10	10	66	52	+14	70	
8	Santa Catalina Atlético	40	14	9	17	47	54	−7	51	
9	Sant Rafel	40	13	11	16	52	48	+4	50	
10	Constància	40	13	9	18	40	45	−5	48	
11	Felanitx	40	12	11	17	58	60	−2	47	
12	Llosetense	40	12	9	19	41	72	−31	45	
13	Binissalem	40	11	11	18	37	57	−20	44 (Note: Binissalem finished ahead of Sóller on head-to-head points: Sóller–Binissalem 1–1, Binissalem–Sóller 1–0)	
14	Sóller	40	11	11	18	43	72	−29	44	
15	Ferriolense	40	9	16	15	32	52	−20	43 (Note: Ferriolense finished ahead of Santanyí on head-to-head points: Santanyí–Ferriolense 0–1, Ferriolense–Santanyí 2–2)	
16	Santanyí	40	10	13	17	37	54	−17	43	
17	Manacor	40	10	7	23	39	62	−23	37	
18	Esporles	40	9	9	22	41	71	−30	36	
19	Son Cladera (R)	40	8	11	21	31	78	−47	35	Relegation to Primera Regional Preferente
20	Mercadal (R)	40	7	12	21	35	56	−21	33	Relegation to Primera Regional Preferente
21	Murense (R)	40	2	11	27	22	79	−57	17	Relegation to Primera Regional Preferente

Rules for classification: 1) points; 2) head-to-head points; 3) head-to-head goal difference; 4) goal difference; 5) number of goals scored; 6) fair-play points; 7) playoff match
(C) Champions; (P) Promoted; (R) Relegated

=== Top goalscorers ===
Goalscorers	Goals	Team
(Spain) Cristian Terán	29	Ibiza Islas Pitiusas
(Spain) Aitor Pons	23	Poblense
(Spain) Sebastià Sastre	17	Alcúdia
(Spain) Dieguito	17	Sant Rafel
(Spain) Víctor de Baunbag	16	Mallorca B

== Group 12 – Canary Islands ==
=== Teams ===
Location of teams of the 2018–19 Tercera División Group 12
Teams in Las Palmas: Las Palmas C, Tamaraceite, Unión Viera

Team	City	Home ground
Atlético Tacoronte	Tacoronte	Barranco las Lajas
Atlético Unión de Güímar	Güímar	Tasagaya
Buzanada	Buzanada, Arona	Clementina de Bello
El Cotillo	La Oliva	Municipal
Ibarra	Las Galletas, Arona	Villa Isabel
La Cuadra-Unión Puerto	Puerto del Rosario	Municipal de Los Pozos
Lanzarote	Arrecife	Ciudad Deportiva
Las Palmas C	Las Palmas	Anexo Gran Canaria
Las Zocas	San Miguel de Abona	Juanito Marrero
Marino	Los Cristianos, Arona	Antonio Domínguez
Mensajero	Santa Cruz de La Palma	Silvestre Carrillo
Panadería Pulido	Vega de San Mateo	San Mateo
San Fernando	San Bartolomé de Tirajana	Ciudad Deportiva
Santa Úrsula	Santa Úrsula	Argelio Tabares
Tamaraceite	Las Palmas	Juan Guedes
Tenerife B	Santa Cruz de Tenerife	Centro Insular
Tenisca	Santa Cruz de La Palma	Virgen de las Nieves
Unión Sur Yaiza	Yaiza	Municipal
Unión Viera	Las Palmas	Alfonso Silva
Villa de Santa Brígida	Santa Brígida	El Guiniguada

=== League table ===
Pos	Team	Pld	W	D	L	GF	GA	GD	Pts	Qualification or relegation
1	Tamaraceite (C)	38	18	13	7	61	33	+28	67	Qualification to group champions' playoffs and Copa del Rey
2	Mensajero	38	18	10	10	61	38	+23	64	Qualification to promotion playoffs
3	Unión Viera	38	18	9	11	53	45	+8	63	Qualification to promotion playoffs
4	Tenerife B	38	16	13	9	47	28	+19	61	Qualification to promotion playoffs
5	Lanzarote (Note: Lanzarote docked three points for fielding an ineligible player in their match against Marino. The match was originally won 1–3 by Lanzarote)	38	17	9	12	58	43	+15	60	
6	Las Palmas C	38	15	14	9	45	28	+17	59	
7	Villa de Santa Brígida	38	14	15	9	51	38	+13	57	
8	San Fernando	38	16	8	14	66	59	+7	56	
9	Santa Úrsula	38	13	14	11	37	36	+1	53	
10	Ibarra	38	15	7	16	43	58	−15	52	
11	Atlético Unión de Güímar	38	11	15	12	48	49	−1	48	
12	Marino	38	12	11	15	53	48	+5	47	
13	Atlético Tacoronte	38	11	12	15	39	45	−6	45 (Note: Atlético Tacoronte finished ahead of Buzanada, La Cuadra-Unión Puerto, and Tenisca on head-to-head points: Atlético Tacoronte 13 pts, Buzanada 8 pts, La Cuadra-Unión Puerto 7 pts, Tenisca 5 pts)	
14	Buzanada	38	12	9	17	38	50	−12	45	
15	La Cuadra-Unión Puerto	38	11	12	15	43	46	−3	45	
16	Tenisca	38	11	12	15	41	50	−9	45	
17	Panadería Pulido	38	11	11	16	62	68	−6	44	
18	Unión Sur Yaiza (R)	38	12	7	19	32	55	−23	43	Relegation to Interinsular Preferente
19	El Cotillo (R)	38	10	11	17	39	62	−23	41	Relegation to Interinsular Preferente
20	Las Zocas (R)	38	9	8	21	37	75	−38	35	Relegation to Interinsular Preferente

Rules for classification: 1) points; 2) head-to-head points; 3) head-to-head goal difference; 4) goal difference; 5) number of goals scored; 6) fair-play points; 7) playoff match
(C) Champions; (R) Relegated

=== Top goalscorers ===
Goalscorers	Goals	Team
(Spain) Víctor Rodríguez	20	Mensajero
(Spain) Yeray Pérez	17	Mensajero
(Spain) Samuel Saavedra	17	Panadería Pulido
(Spain) Ayoze Santana	16	San Fernando
(Spain) Ayose Hernández	15	Buzanada

== Group 13 – Region of Murcia ==
=== Teams ===
Location of teams of the 2018–19 Tercera División Group 13
Teams in Murcia: Ciudad de Murcia, Los Garres, Murcia Imperial
Teams in Lorca: Lorca Dva., Lorca FC

Team	City	Home ground
Águilas	Águilas	El Rubial
Algar	El Algar, Cartagena	Sánchez Luengo
Atlético Pulpileño	Pulpí	San Miguel
Cartagena B	Cartagena	Cartagonova
Cieza	Cieza	La Arboleja
Ciudad de Murcia	Murcia	José Barnés
Churra	Churra, Murcia	Municipal
Deportiva Minera	Llano del Beal, Cartagena	Ángel Cedrán
Estudiantes	Alcantarilla	Ángel Sornichero
Huércal-Overa	Huércal-Overa	El Hornillo
Lorca Deportiva	Lorca	Francisco Artés Carrasco
Lorca FC	Lorca	Francisco Artés Carrasco
La Unión	La Unión	Municipal
Los Garres	Murcia	Las Tejeras
Mar Menor	San Javier	Pitín
Mazarrón	Mazarrón	Municipal
Minerva	Alumbres, Cartagena	El Secante
Muleño	Mula	Municipal
Murcia Imperial	Murcia	Campus Universitario
Olímpico	Totana	Juan Cayuela
UCAM Murcia B	Sangonera la Verde	El Mayayo
Yeclano	Yecla	La Constitución

=== League table ===
Pos	Team	Pld	W	D	L	GF	GA	GD	Pts	Qualification or relegation
1	Yeclano (C, P)	42	27	8	7	88	30	+58	89 (Note: Yeclano finished ahead of Lorca Deportiva on head-to-head points: Lorca Deportiva–Yeclano 1–2, Yeclano–Lorca Deportiva 1–1)	Qualification to group champions' playoffs and Copa del Rey
2	Lorca Deportiva	42	28	5	9	69	28	+41	89	Qualification to promotion playoffs and Copa del Rey
3	Lorca FC (Note: Lorca FC docked 3 points for fielding an ineligible player in their match against Churra. The match was originally won 4–1 by Lorca FC.)	42	22	14	6	73	28	+45	80	Qualification to promotion playoffs
4	Churra	42	23	8	11	63	50	+13	77	Qualification to promotion playoffs
5	Atlético Pulpileño	42	21	13	8	65	41	+24	76	
6	Águilas	42	20	14	8	56	33	+23	74	
7	Mar Menor	42	18	11	13	55	49	+6	65	
8	UCAM Murcia B	42	16	15	11	52	42	+10	63	
9	Deportiva Minera	42	14	13	15	45	55	−10	55	
10	Mazarrón	42	14	12	16	48	56	−8	54 (Note: Mazarrón finished ahead of Olímpico on head-to-head points: Mazarrón–Olímpico 2–1, Olímpico–Mazarrón 1–1)	
11	Olímpico	42	15	9	18	54	64	−10	54	
12	Los Garres	42	13	14	15	36	48	−12	53	
13	Murcia Imperial	42	14	9	19	56	64	−8	51	
14	Muleño	42	12	13	17	44	59	−15	49	
15	Minerva	42	13	9	20	42	55	−13	48 (Note: Minerva finished ahead of Huércal-Overa and Cartagena B on head-to-head points: Minerva 10 pts, Huércal-Overa 7 pts, Cartagena B 0 pts)	
16	Huércal-Overa	42	14	6	22	56	68	−12	48	
17	Cartagena B	42	11	15	16	51	53	−2	48	
18	Ciudad de Murcia (Note: Remained in Tercera División after the relegation of Jumilla due to unpaid wages to their players.)	42	12	8	22	43	70	−27	44	
19	La Unión (R)	42	12	7	23	42	55	−13	43	Relegation to Preferente Autonómica
20	Estudiantes (R)	42	10	12	20	37	55	−18	42	Relegation to Preferente Autonómica
21	Algar (R)	42	9	8	25	29	71	−42	35	Relegation to Preferente Autonómica
22	Cieza (Note: Cieza docked 3 points for abandoning match against Mazarrón. The match was awarded to Mazarrón 3–0) (R)	42	10	5	27	36	66	−30	32	Relegation to Preferente Autonómica

Rules for classification: 1) points; 2) head-to-head points; 3) head-to-head goal difference; 4) goal difference; 5) number of goals scored; 6) fair-play points; 7) playoff match
(C) Champions; (P) Promoted; (R) Relegated

=== Top goalscorers ===
Goalscorers	Goals	Team
(Spain) Alejandro Vaquero	23	Yeclano
(Spain) Gerard Artigas	23	Lorca FC
(Spain) José David Sánchez-Fortún	20	Águilas
(Spain) Campanas	19	Huércal-Overa
(Spain) Ketchu	15	La Unión

== Group 14 – Extremadura ==
=== Teams ===
Location of teams of the 2018–19 Tercera División Group 14
Teams in Cáceres: Cacereño, Diocesano

Team	City	Home ground
Aceuchal	Aceuchal	Municipal
Arroyo	Arroyo de la Luz	Municipal
Atlético Pueblonuevo	Pueblonuevo del Guadiana	Antonio Amaya
Azuaga	Azuaga	Municipal
Cacereño	Cáceres	Príncipe Felipe
Calamonte	Calamonte	Municipal
Castuera	Castuera	Manuel Ruiz
Coria	Coria	La Isla
Diocesano	Cáceres	Campos de la Federación
Extremadura B	Almendralejo	Tomás de la Hera
Jerez	Jerez de los Caballeros	Manuel Calzado Galván
Llerenense	Llerena	Fernando Robina
Mérida	Mérida	Romano
Montijo	Montijo	Municipal
Moralo	Navalmoral de la Mata	Municipal
Olivenza	Olivenza	Municipal
Plasencia	Plasencia	Ciudad Deportiva
Racing Valverdeño	Valverde de Leganés	San Roque
Valdelacalzada	Valdelacalzada	Municipal
Valdivia	Valdivia, Villanueva de la Serena	Primero de Mayo

=== League table ===
Pos	Team	Pld	W	D	L	GF	GA	GD	Pts	Qualification or relegation
1	Mérida (C, P)	38	27	10	1	92	23	+69	91	Qualification to group champions' playoffs and Copa del Rey
2	Cacereño	38	24	8	6	71	26	+45	80 (Note: Cacereño finished ahead of Moralo on overall goal difference)	Qualification to promotion playoffs and Copa del Rey
3	Moralo	38	25	5	8	63	23	+40	80	Qualification to promotion playoffs
4	Coria	38	19	14	5	63	23	+40	71	Qualification to promotion playoffs
5	Plasencia	38	20	10	8	65	33	+32	70	
6	Jerez	38	18	7	13	64	49	+15	61	
7	Extremadura B (Note: Extremadura B docked 3 points for fielding an ineligible player in the match against Valdivia. The match originally was won by Extremadura B 2–0.)	38	15	13	10	55	31	+24	58	
8	Azuaga	38	14	9	15	46	43	+3	51	
9	Diocesano	38	12	13	13	40	45	−5	49 (Note: Diocesano finished ahead of Calamonte on head-to-head points: Calamonte–Diocesano 1–1, Diocesano–Calamonte 2–1)	
10	Calamonte	38	12	13	13	44	45	−1	49	
11	Llerenense	38	13	5	20	43	71	−28	44	
12	Olivenza	38	9	16	13	45	60	−15	43 (Note: Olivenza finished ahead of Valdivia on head-to-head points: Olivenza–Valdivia 2–2, Valdivia–Olivenza 0–1)	
13	Valdivia	38	11	10	17	49	66	−17	43	
14	Montijo	38	11	9	18	41	54	−13	42 (Note: Montijo finished ahead of Arroyo on overall goals scored)	
15	Arroyo	38	10	12	16	31	44	−13	42	
16	Aceuchal	38	9	13	16	35	52	−17	40	
17	Racing Valverdeño	38	10	8	20	39	76	−37	38	
18	Atlético Pueblonuevo (R)	38	8	13	17	20	46	−26	37	Relegation to Regional Preferente
19	Castuera (R)	38	7	10	21	43	73	−30	31	Relegation to Regional Preferente
20	Valdelacalzada (R)	38	3	8	27	22	88	−66	17	Relegation to Regional Preferente

Rules for classification: 1) points; 2) head-to-head points; 3) head-to-head goal difference; 4) goal difference; 5) number of goals scored; 6) fair-play points; 7) playoff match
(C) Champions; (P) Promoted; (R) Relegated

=== Top goalscorers ===
Goalscorers	Goals	Team
(Spain) Cristo Medina	26	Mérida
(Spain) Valentín Prieto	20	Moralo
(Spain) Juanito Hernández	18	Jerez
(Spain) Kevin Vicente	17	Mérida
(Spain) Teto	16	Cacereño

== Group 15 – Navarre ==
=== Teams ===
Location of teams of the 2018–19 Tercera División Group 15
Teams in Pamplona: Txantrea, Osasuna B, Pamplona, San Juan

Team	City	Home ground
Alesves	Villafranca	El Palomar
Ardoi	Zizur Mayor	El Pinar
Atlético Cirbonero	Cintruénigo	San Juan
Avance	Ezcabarte	Igueldea
Baztán	Baztán	Giltxaurdi
Beti Kozkor	Lekunberri	Plazaola
Beti Onak	Villava	Lorenzo Goikoa
Burladés	Burlada	Ripagaina
Cantolagua	Sangüesa	Cantolagua
Corellano	Corella	José Luis de Arrese
Cortes	Cortes	San Francisco Javier
Huarte	Huarte	Areta
Mutilvera	Aranguren	Valle Aranguren
Osasuna B	Pamplona	Tajonar
Pamplona	Pamplona	Bidezarra
Peña Sport	Tafalla	San Francisco
San Juan	Pamplona	San Juan
Subiza	Subiza	Sotoburu
Txantrea	Pamplona	Txantrea
Valle de Egüés	Egüés	Sarriguren

=== League table ===
Pos	Team	Pld	W	D	L	GF	GA	GD	Pts	Qualification or relegation
1	Osasuna B (C, P)	38	29	5	4	89	20	+69	92	Qualification to group champions' playoffs
2	Peña Sport	38	27	7	4	99	35	+64	88	Qualification to promotion playoffs and Copa del Rey
3	Mutilvera	38	24	9	5	69	31	+38	81	Qualification to promotion playoffs and Copa del Rey
4	Beti Kozkor	38	19	14	5	58	32	+26	71	Qualification to promotion playoffs
5	Cortes	38	17	11	10	49	43	+6	62	
6	San Juan	38	14	14	10	55	36	+19	56	
7	Atlético Cirbonero	38	14	10	14	49	38	+11	52	
8	Txantrea	38	11	13	14	56	64	−8	46 (Note: Txantrea finished ahead of Baztán and Burladés on head-to-head points: Txantrea 7 pts, Baztán 5 pts, Burladés 4 pts)	
9	Baztán	38	11	13	14	65	77	−12	46	
10	Burladés	38	11	13	14	36	47	−11	46	
11	Huarte	38	12	8	18	40	57	−17	44	
12	Beti Onak	38	11	10	17	41	65	−24	43 (Note: Beti Onak finished ahead of Ardoi and Subiza on head-to-head points: Beti Onak 8 pts, Ardoi 5 pts, Subiza 2 pts)	
13	Ardoi	38	11	10	17	38	48	−10	43	
14	Subiza	38	10	13	15	51	63	−12	43	
15	Corellano (Note: Corellano docked 3 points for fielding an ineligible player in their match against Subiza. The match was originally won 1–0 by Corellano.)	38	11	8	19	35	64	−29	41	
16	Valle de Egüés	38	10	10	18	45	55	−10	40	
17	Pamplona	38	9	12	17	44	54	−10	39	
18	Avance (R)	38	9	10	19	43	59	−16	37 (Note: Avance finished ahead of Cantolagua on overall goal difference)	Relegation to Regional Preferente
19	Cantolagua (R)	38	8	13	17	39	61	−22	37	Relegation to Regional Preferente
20	Alesves (Note: Alesves docked 3 points for fielding an ineligible player in their match against Cantolagua. The match was originally won 2–0 by Alesves.) (R)	38	7	7	24	39	91	−52	28	Relegation to Regional Preferente

Rules for classification: 1) points; 2) head-to-head points; 3) head-to-head goal difference; 4) goal difference; 5) number of goals scored; 6) fair-play points; 7) playoff match
(C) Champions; (P) Promoted; (R) Relegated

=== Top goalscorers ===
Goalscorers	Goals	Team
(Spain) Marcos Singa	28	Peña Sport
(Spain) Javier Urrutia	28	Baztán
(Spain) Fermín Úriz	19	Peña Sport
(Spain) Joseba Alcuaz	17	Txantrea
(Spain) Barbero	16	Osasuna B

== Group 16 – La Rioja ==
=== Teams ===
Location of teams of the 2018–19 Tercera División Group 16
Teams in Logroño: Berceo, Calasancio, SD Logroñés, UD Logroñés Promesas, Varea, Yagüe

Team	City	Home ground
Agoncillo	Agoncillo	San Roque
Alberite	Alberite	Mariano Sáenz Andollo
Alfaro	Alfaro	La Molineta
Anguiano	Anguiano	Isla
Arnedo	Arnedo	Sendero
Atlético Vianés	Viana	Municipal
Autol	Autol	La Manzanera
Berceo	Logroño	La Isla
Calasancio	Logroño	La Estrella
Haro	Haro	El Mazo
La Calzada	Santo Domingo de La Calzada	El Rollo
Náxara	Nájera	La Salera
Oyonesa	Oyón	El Espinar
Pradejón	Pradejón	Municipal
Rápid Murillo	Murillo de Río Leza	El Rozo
River Ebro	Rincón de Soto	San Miguel
SD Logroñés	Logroño	Las Gaunas
UD Logroñés Promesas	Logroño	Mundial 82
Varea	Logroño	Municipal
Yagüe	Logroño	El Salvador

=== League table ===
Pos	Team	Pld	W	D	L	GF	GA	GD	Pts	Qualification or relegation
1	Haro (C, P)	38	31	4	3	96	17	+79	97	Qualification to group champions' playoffs and Copa del Rey
2	SD Logroñés	38	30	1	7	98	29	+69	91	Qualification to promotion playoffs and Copa del Rey
3	Náxara	38	25	8	5	79	36	+43	83	Qualification to promotion playoffs
4	UD Logroñés Promesas	38	24	6	8	75	35	+40	78 (Note: UD Logroñés Promesas finished ahead of River Ebro on head-to-head points: UD Logroñés Promesas–River Ebro 5–2, River Ebro–UD Logroñés Promesas 1–2)	Qualification to promotion playoffs
5	River Ebro	38	25	3	10	76	48	+28	78	
6	Varea	38	22	3	13	71	42	+29	69	
7	Anguiano	38	20	7	11	77	49	+28	67	
8	Alfaro	38	18	6	14	57	41	+16	60	
9	Yagüe	38	15	8	15	59	60	−1	53	
10	Pradejón	38	14	9	15	50	48	+2	51	
11	Oyonesa	38	11	12	15	41	43	−2	45	
12	Arnedo	38	13	5	20	50	64	−14	44	
13	La Calzada	38	10	10	18	49	73	−24	40	
14	Berceo	38	8	11	19	49	67	−18	35 (Note: Berceo finished ahead of Alberite on overall goal difference)	
15	Alberite	38	8	11	19	41	90	−49	35	
16	Atlético Vianés	38	8	9	21	35	67	−32	33 (Note: Atlético Vianés finished ahead of Calasancio on head-to-head points: Calasancio–Atlético Vianés 0–2, Atlético Vianés–Calasancio 2–1)	
17	Calasancio	38	8	9	21	29	71	−42	33	
18	Rápid Murillo (R)	38	8	4	26	39	84	−45	28	Relegation to Regional Preferente
19	Agoncillo (R)	38	7	4	27	31	91	−60	25 (Note: Agoncillo finished ahead of Autol on head-to-head points: Autol–Agoncillo 0–1, Agoncillo–Autol 2–1)	Relegation to Regional Preferente
20	Autol (R)	38	5	10	23	29	76	−47	25	Relegation to Regional Preferente

Rules for classification: 1) points; 2) head-to-head points; 3) head-to-head goal difference; 4) goal difference; 5) number of goals scored; 6) fair-play points; 7) playoff match
(C) Champions; (P) Promoted; (R) Relegated

== Group 17 – Aragon ==
=== Teams ===
Location of teams of the 2018–19 Tercera División Group 17
Teams in Zaragoza: Casetas, Deportivo Aragón, San Juan

Team	City	Home ground
Almudévar	Almudévar	La Corona
Atlético Monzón	Monzón	Isidro Calderón
Belchite 97	Belchite	Municipal
Binéfar	Binéfar	Los Olmos
Borja	Borja	Manuel Meler
Brea	Brea de Aragón	Piedrabuena
Calamocha	Calamocha	Jumaya
Casetas	Zaragoza	San Miguel
Deportivo Aragón	Zaragoza	Ciudad Deportiva
Illueca	Illueca	Papa Luna
La Almunia	La Almunia de Doña Godina	Tenerías
Robres	Robres	San Blas
Sabiñánigo	Sabiñánigo	Joaquín Ascaso
San Juan	Zaragoza	
San Lorenzo de Flumen	San Lorenzo de Flumen	José Trallero
Sariñena	Sariñena	El Carmen
Tamarite	Tamarite de Litera	La Colomina
Tarazona	Tarazona	Municipal
Utebo	Utebo	Santa Ana
Villanueva	Villanueva de Gállego	Nuevo Enrique Porta

=== League table ===
Pos	Team	Pld	W	D	L	GF	GA	GD	Pts	Qualification or relegation
1	Tarazona (C)	38	22	14	2	72	17	+55	80	Qualification to group champions' playoffs and Copa del Rey
2	Illueca	38	21	9	8	60	34	+26	72 (Note: Illueca finished ahead of Deportivo Aragón on head-to-head points: Deportivo Aragón–Illueca 1–1, Illueca–Deportivo Aragón 2–1)	Qualification to promotion playoffs and Copa del Rey
3	Deportivo Aragón	38	20	12	6	58	19	+39	72	Qualification to promotion playoffs
4	Sariñena	38	20	11	7	51	30	+21	71	Qualification to promotion playoffs
5	Borja	38	20	10	8	54	30	+24	70	
6	Utebo	38	19	10	9	50	31	+19	67	
7	Brea	38	18	7	13	48	34	+14	61	
8	San Juan	38	15	13	10	44	30	+14	58	
9	Atlético Monzón	38	16	9	13	41	35	+6	57	
10	Almudévar	38	13	11	14	42	42	0	50	
11	Binéfar	38	12	11	15	45	50	−5	47	
12	Calamocha	38	13	7	18	41	55	−14	46	
13	Villanueva	38	11	11	16	37	56	−19	44	
14	Robres	38	11	10	17	38	46	−8	43 (Note: Robres finished ahead of Tamarite on head-to-head points: Robres–Tamarite 4–1, Tamarite–Robres 0–0)	
15	Tamarite	38	12	7	19	36	59	−23	43	
16	Belchite 97	38	7	17	14	32	42	−10	38	
17	San Lorenzo de Flumen (R)	38	7	12	19	32	69	−37	33	Relegation to Regional Preferente
18	Sabiñánigo (R)	38	8	8	22	33	55	−22	32	Relegation to Regional Preferente
19	La Almunia (R)	38	7	10	21	38	71	−33	31	Relegation to Regional Preferente
20	Casetas (R)	38	6	5	27	20	67	−47	23	Relegation to Regional Preferente

Rules for classification: 1) points; 2) head-to-head points; 3) head-to-head goal difference; 4) goal difference; 5) number of goals scored; 6) fair-play points; 7) playoff match
(C) Champions; (R) Relegated

== Group 18 – Castilla-La Mancha ==
=== Teams ===
Location of teams of the 2018–19 Tercera División Group 18

Team	City	Home ground
Albacete B	Albacete	Andrés Iniesta
Almagro	Almagro	Manuel Trujillo
Atlético Ibañés	Casas-Ibáñez	Municipal
Atlético Tomelloso	Tomelloso	Paco Gálvez
Azuqueca	Azuqueca de Henares	San Miguel
Calvo Sotelo	Puertollano	Ciudad de Puertollano
Guadalajara	Guadalajara	Pedro Escartín
La Roda	La Roda	Estadio Municipal
La Solana	La Solana	La Moheda
Madridejos	Madridejos	Nuevo Estadio
Manchego	Ciudad Real	Juan Carlos I
Marchamalo	Marchamalo	La Solana
Mora	Mora	Las Delicias
Quintanar del Rey	Quintanar del Rey	San Marcos
Socuéllamos	Socuéllamos	Paquito Jiménez
Tarancón	Tarancón	Municipal
Toledo	Toledo	Salto del Caballo
Villacañas	Villacañas	Las Pirámides
Villarrobledo	Villarrobledo	Nuestra Señora de la Caridad
Villarrubia	Villarrubia de los Ojos	Nuevo Municipal

=== League table ===
Pos	Team	Pld	W	D	L	GF	GA	GD	Pts	Qualification or relegation
1	Socuéllamos (C)	38	28	7	3	83	16	+67	91	Qualification to group champions' playoffs and Copa del Rey
2	Villarrubia (P)	38	23	6	9	61	37	+24	75 (Note: Villarrubia finished ahead of Villarrobledo on head-to-head goal differential: Villarrubia–Villarrobledo 3–0, Villarrobledo–Villarrubia 2–0)	Qualification to promotion playoffs and Copa del Rey
3	Villarrobledo (P)	38	23	6	9	68	42	+26	75	Qualification to promotion playoffs
4	Toledo	38	22	4	12	68	43	+25	70	Qualification to promotion playoffs
5	Atlético Albacete	38	17	12	9	64	43	+21	63	
6	Manchego	38	15	13	10	39	31	+8	58	
7	La Roda	38	15	10	13	41	40	+1	55	
8	Quintanar del Rey	38	15	6	17	49	59	−10	51 (Note: Quintanar del Rey finished ahead of Calvo Sotelo on head-to-head points: Calvo Sotelo–Quintanar del Rey 0–1, Quintanar del Rey–Calvo Sotelo 1–1)	
9	Calvo Sotelo	38	14	9	15	43	47	−4	51	
10	Azuqueca	38	14	8	16	57	55	+2	50	
11	Madridejos	38	14	7	17	39	40	−1	49	
12	Atlético Ibañés	38	13	6	19	55	58	−3	45 (Note: Atlético Ibañés finished ahead of La Solana on head-to-head goal differential: La Solana–Atlético Ibañés 0–5, Atlético Ibañés–La Solana 1–2)	
13	La Solana	38	12	9	17	38	55	−17	45	
14	Tarancón	38	13	5	20	56	74	−18	44	
15	Guadalajara	38	13	4	21	45	67	−22	43 (Note: Guadalajara finished ahead of Almagro on head-to-head points: Almagro–Guadalajara 1–1, Guadalajara–Almagro 4–2)	
16	Almagro	38	11	10	17	40	51	−11	43	
17	Villacañas	38	11	9	18	39	56	−17	42	
18	Atlético Tomelloso (R)	38	10	10	18	39	55	−16	40	Relegation to Primera Autonómica Preferente
19	Marchamalo (R)	38	10	7	21	33	65	−32	37	Relegation to Primera Autonómica Preferente
20	Mora (R)	38	9	8	21	27	50	−23	35	Relegation to Primera Autonómica Preferente

Rules for classification: 1) points; 2) head-to-head points; 3) head-to-head goal difference; 4) goal difference; 5) number of goals scored; 6) fair-play points; 7) playoff match
(C) Champions; (P) Promoted; (R) Relegated
