= Juanito (footballer, born 1990) =

Spanish footballer

Personal information
- Full name: Juan Benítez Ramos
- Date of birth: 10 March 1990 (age 36)
- Place of birth: Jerez de la Frontera, Spain
- Height: 1.78 m (5 ft 10 in)
- Position: Midfielder

Team information
- Current team: Xerez

Youth career
- Xerez

Senior career*
Years	Team	Apps	(Gls)
2010–2013	Xerez B	62	(29)
2012	Xerez	1	(0)
2013–2014	Pobla Mafumet	14	(1)
2014	Lebrijana		
2014	Guadalcacín	9	(1)
2014–2015	Jerez Industrial	10	(7)
2015	Sant Jordi	10	(8)
2015	Roteña	3	(1)
2015–2016	Jerez Industrial	29	(12)
2016–	Xerez	54	(19)
- * Club domestic league appearances and goals as of 7 January 2018

Juan Benítez Ramos (born 10 March 1990), commonly known as Juanito, is a Spanish footballer who plays for Xerez CD as a midfielder.

== Club career ==
Born in Jerez de la Frontera, Province of Cádiz, Juanito finished his formation with Xerez CD, making his debuts as a senior with the reserves in 2010, in the regional divisions. He played his first official game with the Andalusians' first team on 3 June 2012, featuring 62 minutes as a substitute in a 0–6 home loss against FC Barcelona B in the Segunda División.

On 6 August 2013, Juanito signed with CF Pobla de Mafumet in Tercera División. He subsequently resumed his career in the lower leagues, representing UB Lebrijana, CD Guadalcacín, Jerez Industrial CF (two stints), PE Sant Jordi and UD Roteña before returning to Xerez in 2016.
