= Carlos Caloi =

Spanish footballer

Personal information
- Full name: Carlos Rodríguez Portela
- Date of birth: 11 February 1987 (age 39)
- Place of birth: Pontevedra, Spain
- Position: Midfielder

Team information
- Current team: Choco

Senior career*
Years	Team	Apps	(Gls)
2009–2011	Alondras	15	(2)
2011–2014	Choco	69	(12)
2014	Honka	10	(1)
2015–2016	PK-35	31	(3)
2016–2017	Coruxo	9	(0)
2017	Choco	10	(0)
2017	Honka	15	(0)
2018–	Choco	57	(0)
- * Club domestic league appearances and goals as of 19:42, 26 June 2020 (UTC)

Carlos Rodríguez Portela (born 11 February 1987), commonly known as Carlos Caloi is a Spanish footballer who plays for CD Choco as a midfielder.

== Career ==
Born in Pontevedra, Caloi kicked off his career in Spain with Tercera División side Alondras. In 2011, he moved to fellow club Choco.

In May 2014, Caloi moved abroad for the first time and signed for Finnish club Honka where he joined fellow Spaniard Pablo Couñago. He scored his debut goal for the club in a 4–1 defeat against Mariehamn. In December, it was announced that Honka was relegated from the Veikkausliiga as they failed to pay a debt of 600,000 euros.

Caloi moved to Finnish second tier club PK-35 in 2015 joining a host of Spanish compatriots. The season ended with the club winning promotion to Veikkausliiga. In July 2016, he returned to Spain and signed for Segunda División B club Coruxo. He left the club the following January and returned to Choco.

In June 2015, Caloi switched clubs and countries and resigned for Finnish club Honka.
