= CD Ferriolense =

Spanish football team

Ferriolense
- Full name: Club Deportivo Ferriolense
- Founded: 1965
- Ground: Municipal, Son Ferriol, Balearic Islands, Spain
- Capacity: 3,000
- Chairman: (Spain) Gabriel Pons
- Manager: (Spain) José Antonio García "Tato"
- League: División de Honor – Mallorca
- 2025–26: División de Honor – Mallorca, 3rd of 18
Home colours	Away colours

Club Deportivo Ferriolense is a Spanish football team based in Son Ferriol, in the autonomic community of Balearic Islands. Founded in 1965 it plays in División de Honor – Mallorca, holding home games at Estadio Municipal de Son Ferriol, with a 3,000-seat capacity.

The club was a second reserve team of Mallorca between 2000 and 2003.

== Season to season ==
Season	Tier	Division	Place	Copa del Rey
1971–72	5	2ª Reg.	7th	
1972–73	6	2ª Reg.	13th	
1973–74	7	3ª Reg.	2nd	
1974–75	6	2ª Reg.	3rd	
1975–76	5	1ª Reg.	6th	
1976–77	5	1ª Reg.	13th	
1977–78	6	1ª Reg.	16th	
1978–79	7	2ª Reg.	13th	
1979–80	7	2ª Reg.	12th	
1980–81	7	2ª Reg.	12th	
1981–82	7	2ª Reg.	15th	
1982–83	7	2ª Reg.	17th	
1983–84	8	3ª Reg.	2nd	
1984–85	7	2ª Reg.	2nd	
1985–86	6	1ª Reg.	4th	
1986–87	6	1ª Reg.	1st	
1987–88	5	Reg. Pref.	4th	
1988–89	5	Reg. Pref.	2nd	
1989–90	5	Reg. Pref.	1st	
1990–91	4	3ª	10th	

Season	Tier	Division	Place	Copa del Rey
1991–92	4	3ª	7th	
1992–93	4	3ª	6th	Second round
1993–94	4	3ª	13th	
1994–95	4	3ª	8th	
1995–96	4	3ª	9th	
1996–97	4	3ª	7th	
1997–98	4	3ª	12th	
1998–99	4	3ª	3rd	
1999–2000	4	3ª	11th	
2000–01	4	3ª	2nd	N/A (Note: Second reserve team of Mallorca.)
2001–02	4	3ª	2nd	N/A
2002–03	4	3ª	6th	N/A
2003–04	4	3ª	13th	
2004–05	4	3ª	6th	
2005–06	4	3ª	3rd	
2006–07	4	3ª	7th	
2007–08	4	3ª	5th	
2008–09	4	3ª	6th	
2009–10	4	3ª	4th	
2010–11	4	3ª	12th	

Season	Tier	Division	Place	Copa del Rey
2011–12	4	3ª	17th	
2012–13	4	3ª	11th	
2013–14	4	3ª	14th	
2014–15	4	3ª	17th	
2015–16	4	3ª	12th	
2016–17	4	3ª	9th	
2017–18	4	3ª	14th	
2018–19	4	3ª	15th	
2019–20	4	3ª	10th	
2020–21	4	3ª	10th / 8th	
2021–22	6	Reg. Pref.	7th	
2022–23	6	Reg. Pref.	2nd	
2023–24	6	Reg. Pref.	10th	
2024–25	7	Pref. Reg.	2nd	
2025–26	6	Div. Hon.	3rd	
2026–27	6	Div. Hon.		

- 31 seasons in Tercera División
