= Juan Benítez =

Juan Benítez may refer to:

- Juan Benítez (footballer, born 1953), Paraguayan football forward
- Juan Manuel Benítez (born 1974), Spanish journalist
- Juan Benítez (born 1990), Spanish football midfielder
