= EDMF Churra =

Association football club in Spain

Churra
- Full name: Escuela Deportiva Municipal de Fútbol Churra
- Founded: 2009
- Ground: Municipal, Churra, Murcia, Spain
- Capacity: 1,000
- Chairman: Mariano Albadalejo
- Manager: Ismael Ibáñez
- 2024–25: Preferente Autonómica, 18th of 18 (relegated)
| Home colours | Away colours |

Escuela Deportiva Municipal de Fútbol Churra is a Spanish football team based in Churra, in the Region of Murcia. Founded in 2009, it holds home matches at Campo Municipal de Churra.

== Season to season ==
| Season | Tier | Division | Place | Copa del Rey |
|---|---|---|---|---|
| 2009–10 | 7 | 1ª Terr. | 2nd | |
| 2010–11 | 6 | 1ª Aut. | 6th | |
| 2011–12 | 6 | 1ª Aut. | 5th | |
| 2012–13 | 5 | Pref. Aut. | 18th | |
| 2013–14 | 6 | 1ª Aut. | 1st | |
| 2014–15 | 5 | Pref. Aut. | 4th | |
| 2015–16 | 4 | 3ª | 12th | |
| 2016–17 | 4 | 3ª | 14th | |

| Season | Tier | Division | Place | Copa del Rey |
|---|---|---|---|---|
| 2017–18 | 4 | 3ª | 4th | |
| 2018–19 | 4 | 3ª | 4th | |
| 2019–20 | 4 | 3ª | 13th | |
| 2020–21 | 4 | 3ª | 10th / 6th | |
| 2021–22 | 6 | Pref. Aut. | 3rd | |
| 2022–23 | 6 | Pref. Aut. | 3rd | |
| 2023–24 | 6 | Pref. Aut. | 13th | |
| 2024–25 | 6 | Pref. Aut. | 18th | |

- 6 seasons in Tercera División
