= Deportivo Alavés B =

Spanish football club

Alavés B
- Full name: Deportivo Alavés B, S.A.D.
- Nicknames: Alavés Aficionados, Miniglorias
- Founded: 1959 (62 years)
- Ground: José Luis Compañón, Vitoria, Basque Country, Spain
- Capacity: 2,500
- President: Alfonso Fernández de Trocóniz
- Head coach: Molo
- League: Segunda Federación – Group 1
- 2025–26: Segunda Federación – Group 2, 2nd of 18
| Home colours | Away colours | Third colours |

Deportivo Alavés B, S.A.D., usually known as Alavés B, is a Spanish football team based in Vitoria-Gasteiz, in the autonomous community of Basque Country. Founded in 1959 it is the reserve team of Deportivo Alavés, and currently plays in Segunda Federación – Group 1, holding home matches at Instalaciones de Ibaia-José Luis Compañon, the club's training facilities with 2,500 seat-capacity.

The team's home kit is blue and white-striped shirt, blue shorts and white socks.

== League history ==
The league placings have largely mirrored the fortunes of the senior team. From their formation in the 1960s until the late 1990s, Alavés B competed only in the fourth (Tercera Grupo IV) or fifth (Preferente de Álava) tiers. They achieved promotion to Segunda División B in 1999, a year after the seniors climbed to La Liga. Alavés B remained in the third level for seven seasons, usually finishing mid-table, until demotion in 2005-06, the same year that the main side was relegated amid economic turmoil under Dmitry Piterman.

During the 2000s, Alavés B practically not contributed players to the Alavés first team, which has been almost exclusively nourished by foreign signings, and the decline of the club continued when the senior side themselves dropped into Segunda División B in 2009, while the B team were relegated back down to the fifth level. It took Alavés B only two seasons to regain fourth-level status whereas the seniors took four years to rise again to the second level, but they then gained promotion to La Liga after three further seasons while the B team stayed put in Tercera División from that point on; they eventually gained promotion in 2018–19 via the playoffs.

== Season to season ==
- As a farm team

| Season | Tier | Division | Place | Copa del Rey |
|---|---|---|---|---|
| 1961–62 | 4 | 1ª Reg. | 5th | |
| 1962–63 | 4 | 1ª Reg. | 4th | |
| 1963–64 | 4 | 1ª Reg. | 3rd | |
| 1964–65 | 4 | 1ª Reg. | 3rd | |
| 1965–66 | 4 | 1ª Reg. | 2nd | |
| 1966–67 | 4 | 1ª Reg. | 12th | |
| 1967–68 | 4 | 1ª Reg. | 8th | |
| 1968–69 | 5 | 2ª Reg. | 8th | |
| 1969–70 | 5 | 2ª Reg. | 8th | |
| 1970–71 | DNP | | | |
| 1971–72 | DNP | | | |
| 1972–73 | DNP | | | |
| 1973–74 | 5 | 2ª Reg. | 1st | |
| 1974–75 | 4 | Reg. Pref. | 13th | |
| 1975–76 | 4 | Reg. Pref. | 7th | |

| Season | Tier | Division | Place | Copa del Rey |
|---|---|---|---|---|
| 1976–77 | 4 | Reg. Pref. | 13th | |
| 1977–78 | 5 | Reg. Pref. | 8th | |
| 1978–79 | 5 | Reg. Pref. | 3rd | |
| 1979–80 | 4 | 3ª | 2nd | First round |
| 1980–81 | 4 | 3ª | 10th | Second round |
| 1981–82 | 4 | 3ª | 8th | |
| 1982–83 | 4 | 3ª | 20th | First round |
| 1983–84 | 5 | Reg. Pref. | 5th | |
| 1984–85 | 5 | Reg. Pref. | 16th | |
| 1985–86 | 5 | Reg. Pref. | 17th | |
| 1986–87 | 6 | 1ª Reg. | 3rd | |
| 1987–88 | 5 | Reg. Pref. | 4th | |
| 1988–89 | 5 | Reg. Pref. | 1st | |
| 1989–90 | 5 | Reg. Pref. | 3rd | |
| 1990–91 | 5 | Reg. Pref. | 2nd | |

- As a reserve team

| Season | Tier | Division | Place |
|---|---|---|---|
| 1991–92 | 5 | Reg. Pref. | 4th |
| 1992–93 | 5 | Reg. Pref. | 9th |
| 1993–94 | 5 | Reg. Pref. | 1st |
| 1994–95 | 4 | 3ª | 16th |
| 1995–96 | 4 | 3ª | 6th |
| 1996–97 | 4 | 3ª | 3rd |
| 1997–98 | 4 | 3ª | 7th |
| 1998–99 | 4 | 3ª | 2nd |
| 1999–2000 | 3 | 2ª B | 11th |
| 2000–01 | 3 | 2ª B | 10th |
| 2001–02 | 3 | 2ª B | 10th |
| 2002–03 | 3 | 2ª B | 5th |
| 2003–04 | 3 | 2ª B | 6th |
| 2004–05 | 3 | 2ª B | 12th |
| 2005–06 | 3 | 2ª B | 18th |
| 2006–07 | 4 | 3ª | 10th |
| 2007–08 | 4 | 3ª | 13th |
| 2008–09 | 4 | 3ª | 19th |
| 2009–10 | 5 | Reg. Pref. | 5th |
| 2010–11 | 5 | Reg. Pref. | 2nd |

| Season | Tier | Division | Place |
|---|---|---|---|
| 2011–12 | 4 | 3ª | 17th |
| 2012–13 | 4 | 3ª | 14th |
| 2013–14 | 4 | 3ª | 5th |
| 2014–15 | 4 | 3ª | 7th |
| 2015–16 | 4 | 3ª | 12th |
| 2016–17 | 4 | 3ª | 1st |
| 2017–18 | 4 | 3ª | 3rd |
| 2018–19 | 4 | 3ª | 3rd |
| 2019–20 | 3 | 2ª B | 11th |
| 2020–21 | 3 | 2ª B | 9th / 6th |
| 2021–22 | 5 | 3ª RFEF | 1st |
| 2022–23 | 4 | 2ª Fed. | 2nd |
| 2023–24 | 4 | 2ª Fed. | 6th |
| 2024–25 | 4 | 2ª Fed. | 8th |
| 2025–26 | 4 | 2ª Fed. | 2nd |
| 2026–27 | 4 | 2ª Fed. | |

- 8 seasons in Segunda División B
- 5 seasons in Segunda Federación
- 20 seasons in Tercera División
- 1 season in Tercera División RFEF

== Current squad ==
As of 19 September 2026.

Note: Flags indicate national team as defined under FIFA eligibility rules; some limited exceptions apply. Players may hold more than one non-FIFA nationality.

| No. | Pos. | Nation | Player |
|---|---|---|---|
| 1 | GK | CAN | Grégoire Świderski |
| 2 | DF | ESP | Ibón Martinez de Aramaiona |
| 3 | DF | ESP | Carlos Ballestero |
| 4 | DF | ESP | Xanet Olaiz |
| 5 | DF | ESP | Paco Sanz |
| 7 | FW | ESP | Flavio Ferullo |
| 8 | FW | ESP | Pablo Goitia |
| 9 | FW | ESP | Dennis Rufo |
| 10 | MF | ESP | Lander Pinillos |
| 11 | FW | ESP | Iñaki Alberca |
| 12 | DF | ESP | Manex Irizar |
| 13 | GK | ESP | Rubén Montero |
| 14 | MF | ESP | Iván Garrido |

| No. | Pos. | Nation | Player |
|---|---|---|---|
| 15 | MF | ESP | Ander Varona |
| 18 | DF | ESP | Iker Uria |
| 19 | FW | ESP | Chema Aragües |
| 20 | FW | ESP | Hugo Martínez |
| 21 | MF | ESP | Carlo Viso |
| 22 | MF | BRA | Edu Fontana |
| 24 | FW | ALG | Tazghat Bouguettaya |
| 26 | MF | ESP | Izei Hernández |
| 31 | GK | ESP | Pablo Vinagre |
| 32 | MF | ESP | Igor Ortiz |
| 34 | MF | MAR | Sami El Mahboubi |
| — | FW | ESP | Aimar González |

=== Reserve team ===
Note: Flags indicate national team as defined under FIFA eligibility rules; some limited exceptions apply. Players may hold more than one non-FIFA nationality.

| No. | Pos. | Nation | Player |
|---|---|---|---|
| 27 | DF | ESP | Ander Carmona |
| 28 | FW | ESP | Asier Alava |

| No. | Pos. | Nation | Player |
|---|---|---|---|
| 29 | FW | BEL | Alseny Sylla |
| 30 | DF | ESP | Oihan Vicente |

=== Out on loan ===
Note: Flags indicate national team as defined under FIFA eligibility rules; some limited exceptions apply. Players may hold more than one non-FIFA nationality.

| No. | Pos. | Nation | Player |

== Honours ==
- Tercera División (Note: Fourth tier)
  - Champions (1): 2016–17 (Note: Not promoted in play-offs)
- RFEF Basque tournament
  - Winners (3): 2015–16, 2016–17, 2017–18

== Notable players ==
- (Spain) Ángel
- (Spain) Javier Carpio
- (Spain) Juan Pablo Colinas
- (Spain) Óscar de Marcos
- (Spain) Iñaki Garmendia
- (Spain) Sergio Llamas
- (Spain) Juan Cruz Ochoa
- (Spain) Andrea Orlandi
- (Spain) Rubén Pérez
- (Spain) Sergio Pérez
- (Spain) Nacho Rodríguez
- (Spain) Asier Salcedo
- (Spain) Josu Sarriegi
- (Spain) Fernando Seoane
- (Spain) Gaizka Toquero
- (Spain) Mikel Vesga
