= CD Buzanada =

Spanish football club

Buzanada
- Full name: Club Deportivo Buzanada
- Founded: 1976
- Ground: Clementina de Bello, Arona, Tenerife, Canary Islands, Spain
- Capacity: 1,000
- President: Iván Rancel
- Head coach: Willy Barroso
- League: Interinsular Preferente
- 2025–26: Interinsular Preferente, 15th of 20
Home colours	Away colours

Club Deportivo Buzanada is a Spanish football team based in Arona, in the autonomous community of Canary Islands. Founded in 1976, it plays in Interinsular Preferente, holding home matches at Campo Municipal Clementina de Bello, with a capacity of 1,000 seats.

== Season to season ==
Season	Tier	Division	Place	Copa del Rey
1980–81	7	2ª Reg.	7th	
1981–82	7	2ª Reg.	1st	
1982–83	7	2ª Reg.	2nd	
1983–84	6	1ª Terr.	12th	
1984–85	6	1ª Terr.	11th	
1985–86	6	1ª Terr.	1st	
1986–87	5	Terr. Pref.	14th	
1987–88	6	1ª Terr.	9th	
1988–89	6	1ª Terr.	3rd	
1989–90	6	1ª Terr.	5th	
1990–91	6	1ª Terr.	2nd	
1991–92	5	Int. Pref.	15th	
1992–93	5	Int. Pref.	16th	
1993–94	6	1ª Int.	6th	
1994–95	6	1ª Int.	10th	
1995–96	6	1ª Int.	14th	
1996–97	6	1ª Int.	13th	
1997–98	6	1ª Int.	5th	
1998–99	6	1ª Int.	6th	
1999–2000	6	1ª Int.	10th	

Season	Tier	Division	Place	Copa del Rey
2000–01	6	1ª Int.	4th	
2001–02	6	1ª Int.	15th	
2002–03	7	2ª Int.	7th	
2003–04	7	2ª Int.	1st	
2004–05	7	2ª Int.	4th	
2005–06	7	2ª Int.	1st	
2006–07	6	1ª Int.	4th	
2007–08	6	1ª Int.	5th	
2008–09	6	1ª Int.	11th	
2009–10	6	1ª Int.	9th	
2010–11	6	1ª Int.	7th	
2011–12	6	1ª Int.	3rd	
2012–13	5	Int. Pref.	8th	
2013–14	5	Int. Pref.	1st	
2014–15	5	Int. Pref.	1st	
2015–16	5	Int. Pref.	1st	
2016–17	4	3ª	10th	
2017–18	4	3ª	15th	
2018–19	4	3ª	14th	
2019–20	4	3ª	19th	

Season	Tier	Division	Place	Copa del Rey
2020–21	4	3ª	4th / 1st	
2021–22	5	3ª RFEF	12th	
2022–23	6	Int. Pref.	1st	
2023–24	5	3ª Fed.	12th	
2024–25	5	3ª Fed.	15th	
2025–26	6	Int. Pref.		

- 5 seasons in Tercera División
- 3 seasons in Tercera Federación/Tercera División RFEF
