= Iñaki Garmendia =

Spanish footballer

Personal information
- Full name: Iñaki Garmendia Larrea
- Date of birth: 18 August 1981 (age 45)
- Place of birth: Vitoria, Spain
- Height: 1.78 m (5 ft 10 in)
- Position: Right back

Senior career*
Years	Team	Apps	(Gls)
2002–2003	Durango		
2003–2005	Alavés B	64	(0)
2005–2006	Extremadura	31	(0)
2006–2008	Jaén	53	(0)
2008–2009	Amurrio	30	(0)
2009–2013	Mirandés	110	(3)
2013–2017	Amorebieta	109	(4)
2017–2018	Aurrerá		
Total		397	(7)
- * Club domestic league appearances and goals

Iñaki Garmendia Larrea (born 18 August 1981) is a Spanish former footballer who played as a right back.

He spent most of his 16-year senior career in the lower leagues. His professional input consisted of 29 Segunda División matches with Mirandés, in the 2012–13 season.

== Club career ==
Garmendia was born in Vitoria-Gasteiz, Álava. After starting out at SCD Durango, he spent the vast majority of his career in the Segunda División B, representing Deportivo Alavés' reserves, CF Extremadura and Real Jaén. In 2008–09 he moved down to the Tercera División, and joined Amurrio Club.

On 21 July 2009, Garmendia signed a contract with CD Mirandés of the third division. He contributed 28 games (all starts) and two goals in his third season, as the Castile and León-based team promoted to Segunda División for the first time in its history.

On 17 August 2012, one day shy of his 31st birthday, Garmendia made his debut in the second tier, starting in a 0–1 home loss against SD Huesca. He left the club the following year, and joined SD Amorebieta in division three.

Garmendia moved to amateurs CD Aurrerá de Vitoria – also in his native region – in the summer of 2017.
