= Lander Pinillos =

Spanish footballer (born 2003)

Personal information
- Full name: Lander Pinillos Wilson
- Date of birth: 6 October 2003 (age 23)
- Place of birth: Pamplona, Spain
- Height: 1.78 m (5 ft 10 in)
- Position: Attacking midfielder

Team information
- Current team: Alavés B
- Number: 10

Youth career
- Izarra
- 2021–2022: Mutilvera

Senior career*
Years	Team	Apps	(Gls)
2021	Izarra	1	(0)
2022	Mutilvera B	1	(0)
2022	Mutilvera	1	(0)
2022–2024	Alavés C	23	(2)
2022–	Alavés B	68	(11)
2025–	Alavés	1	(0)
- * Club domestic league appearances and goals as of 17 May 2026

Lander Pinillos Wilson (born 6 October 2003) is a Spanish footballer who plays for Deportivo Alavés B. Mainly an attacking midfielder, he can also play as a winger.

== Career ==
Born in Pamplona, Navarre, Pinillos played for local side CD Izarra as a youth. He made his first team debut at the age of 17 on 23 May 2021, coming on as a second-half substitute in a 1–1 Segunda División B away draw against Barakaldo CF.

In 2021, Pinillos joined UD Mutilvera; initially a member of the Juvenil squad, he played one match for the B-team in the Primera Autonómica, before making his first team debut on 6 February 2022, playing the last six minutes in a 2–0 Segunda División RFEF loss to former side Izarra. In July, he joined the structure of Deportivo Alavés, being initially a member of the C-team in the regional leagues.

Pinillos also featured for the reserves shortly after arriving, but only became a regular starter for the side during the 2024–25 season. On 12 July 2025, while making the pre-season with the main squad, he renewed his contract until 2027.

Pinillos made his first team – and La Liga – debut on 22 August 2025, replacing Antonio Blanco late into a 1–0 away draw against Real Betis.

== Personal life ==
Born in Spain, Pinillos is of English descent through his mother, who hails from Sandwich.
