= Carlos Ballestero =

Spanish footballer (born 2004)

Personal information
- Full name: Carlos Ballestero García
- Date of birth: 24 April 2004 (age 22)
- Place of birth: Oviedo, Spain
- Height: 1.78 m (5 ft 10 in)
- Position: Right-back

Team information
- Current team: Alavés B
- Number: 3

Youth career
- Oviedo
- Atlético Madrid

Senior career*
Years	Team	Apps	(Gls)
2023–2025	Almería B	49	(0)
2025–	Alavés B	22	(0)
2025–	Alavés	1	(0)
- * Club domestic league appearances and goals as of 7 May 2026

Carlos Ballestero García (born 24 April 2004) is a Spanish footballer who plays for Deportivo Alavés B. Mainly a right-back, he can also play as a centre-back.

== Career ==
Born in Oviedo, Asturias, Ballestero joined Atlético Madrid's youth categories in June 2019, from hometown side Real Oviedo. On 3 August 2023, after finishing his formation, he moved to UD Almería and was assigned to the reserves in Tercera Federación.

Ballestero made his senior debut on 17 September 2023, playing the last three minutes in a 2–1 home win over CP Almería, and was regularly used during the season as the B-team achieved promotion to Segunda Federación. On 29 July 2025, he moved to another reserve team, signing a two-year contract with Deportivo Alavés B also in the fourth division.

Ballestero made his first team debut with the Babazorros on 30 October 2025, starting in a 7–0 away routing of CD Getxo, for the campaign's Copa del Rey. His professional – and La Liga – debut occurred the following 13 March, as he came on as a late substitute for Nahuel Tenaglia in a 1–1 home draw against Villarreal CF.
