= Churra, Spain =

Churra City
- Municipality
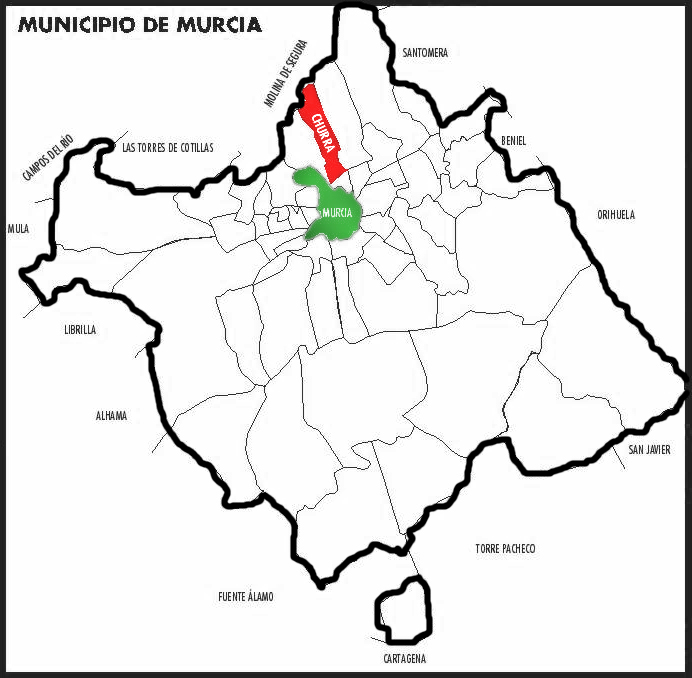
- Churra (in red) within Murcia

- Location in Spain
- Coordinates: 38°01′19″N 1°08′22″W
- Country: Spain
- Autonomous community: Murcia
- Province: Murcia
- Comarca: Huerta de Murcia
- Judicial district: Murcia
- Founded: IX century

Government
  - Alcalde pedaneo: Francisco Muñoz Botía (2007) (PP)

Area
  - Total: 5.6 km^{2} (2.2 sq mi)
- Elevation: 57 m (187 ft)

Population (2004)
  - Total: 4,875
  - Density: 870/km^{2} (2,300/sq mi)
- Demonym: Churrero/a
- Time zone: UTC+1 (CET)
  - Summer (DST): UTC+2 (CEST)
- Postal code: 30110
- Dialing code: 968 / 868
- Website: Official website

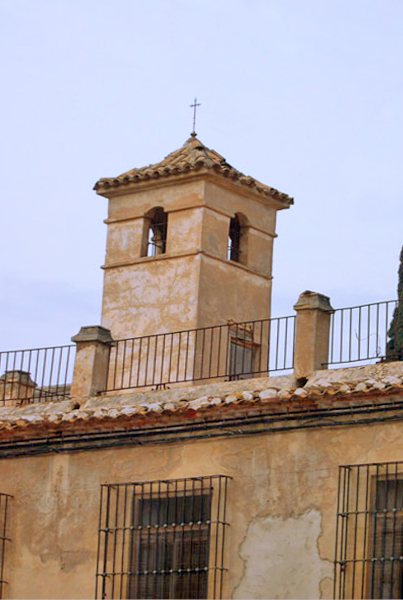
Torre Alcayna

Churra is a hamlet belonging to the municipality of Murcia (Spain), with a municipal board. It is a semi-agricultural town, although in recent years it has opened its economy to industry, and especially the service sector (commerce), with two hypermarkets (Thader and Nueva Condomina). It had a population of 4,912 inhabitants (Instituto Nacional de Estadística (Spain) in 2004) and an area of 5.6 square kilometers. The distance to Murcia city center is 3.5 kilometers, served with a tram, and lies at an altitude of 57 meters above sea level.

It was founded during the Islamic domination around the ninth century and since then its history has always been closely linked to that of Murcia, becoming in this hamlet of the eighteenth century. There are vestiges of its history in the village, such as the New and Old Ditches and Torre Alcayna House.
