= CD Guadalcacín =

Spanish football team

Guadalcacín
- Full name: Club Deportivo Guadalcacín
- Founded: 1954
- Ground: Antonio Fernández Marchán, Guadalcacín, Andalusia, Spain
- Capacity: 1,000
- Chairman: Salvador Lirio Piñero
- Manager: David Navarro
- League: Primera Andaluza Cádiz
- 2024–25: Primera Andaluza Cádiz, 8th of 16
Home colours	Away colours

Club Deportivo Guadalcacín is a Spanish football team based in Guadalcacín, Province of Cádiz, in the autonomous community of Andalusia. Founded in 1954, it plays in Primera Andaluza Cádiz, holding home games at Estadio Municipal Antonio Fernández Marchán.

== Season to season ==
Season	Tier	Division	Place	Copa del Rey
1954–1971	—	Regional	—	
1971–72	6	3ª Reg.	8th	
1972–73	6	3ª Reg.	6th	
1973–74	6	3ª Reg.	5th	
1974–75	7	2ª Reg. B	2nd	
1975–76	7	2ª Reg. B	5th	
1976–77	7	2ª Reg. B	13th	
1977–78	7	2ª Reg.	6th	
1978–79	7	2ª Reg.	5th	
1979–80	7	2ª Reg.	2nd	
1980–81	7	2ª Reg.	6th	
1981–82	7	2ª Reg.	12th	
1982–83	7	2ª Reg.	1st	
1983–84	7	2ª Reg.	12th	
1984–1994	DNP			
1994–95	6	1ª Reg.	13th	
1995–96	6	1ª Reg.	13th	
1996–97	5	Reg. Pref.	11th	
1997–98	5	Reg. Pref.	6th	
1998–99	5	Reg. Pref.	6th	

Season	Tier	Division	Place	Copa del Rey
1999–2000	5	Reg. Pref.	12th	
2000–01	5	Reg. Pref.	11th	
2001–02	5	Reg. Pref.	17th	
2002–03	6	1ª Reg.	4th	
2003–04	5	Reg. Pref.	13th	
2004–05	6	Reg. Pref.	12th	
2005–06	6	Reg. Pref.	8th	
2006–07	6	Reg. Pref.	8th	
2007–08	6	Reg. Pref.	7th	
2008–09	6	Reg. Pref.	7th	
2009–10	6	Reg. Pref.	1st	
2010–11	5	1ª And.	14th	
2011–12	5	1ª And.	9th	
2012–13	5	1ª And.	9th	
2013–14	5	1ª And.	1st	
2014–15	4	3ª	15th	
2015–16	4	3ª	11th	
2016–17	4	3ª	13th	
2017–18	4	3ª	14th	
2018–19	4	3ª		

Season	Tier	Division	Place	Copa del Rey
2019–20	5	Div. Hon.	12th	
2020–21	5	Div. Hon.	4th	
2021–22	6	Div. Hon.	15th	
2022–23	7	1ª And.	12th	
2023–24	7	1ª And.	6th	
2024–25	7	1ª And.	8th	
2025–26	7	1ª And.		

- 5 seasons in Tercera División
