= Chūma =

Chūma (中馬, chūma, lit. "middle horse") was a system of private cargo transportation in medieval Shinano Province, Japan.

Due to the mountainous terrain in Shinano, it was not possible to transport agricultural goods and other cargo via a system of inland waterways. As a result, a number of private companies began using packhorses to move supplies through the area. They found themselves in direct competition with the official post-station system, over which they had significant advantages (for example, packhorse teams were not obliged to reload their goods onto fresh horses at each waystation). Conflicts between representatives of the two systems were not uncommon. Because the Ina road which was the main thoroughfare of Shinano was not under direct control of the bakufu government (and had little official traffic), packhorse operators were able to monopolise the freight trade.

Packhorse couriers in Shinano fell into three main types. The first were local peasants, hauling their goods and those of their neighbours to market. The second were carriers from nearby Iida, hired by merchants there to bring produce to the town. Finally, there were groups of independent traders who purchased, transported and sold goods on their own initiative. In the late seventeenth century, representatives from all three of these groups founded the chuma nakama, a semi-formal trade association, to promote the interests of packhorse operators and resist the attacks of the official post-station system.

Legalised by the authorities in 1673, by 1764 chuma was sufficiently lucrative that the shogunate introduced specific legislation to regulate it.
