= Chuma (footballer) =

Spanish footballer

Personal information
- Full name: Rafael González Rodríguez
- Date of birth: 13 February 1997 (age 29)
- Place of birth: Seville, Spain
- Position: Forward

Team information
- Current team: Xerez
- Number: 17

Youth career
- Sevilla

Senior career*
Years	Team	Apps	(Gls)
2015–2017	Sevilla C	38	(12)
2017–2018	Lebrijana	20	(13)
2018–2019	Córdoba B	47	(21)
2019	Córdoba	3	(0)
2019–2020	Levante B	17	(0)
2020–2021	Xerez	22	(6)
2021–2022	San Roque	32	(16)
2022–2023	UCAM Murcia	15	(1)
2023–2024	Mérida	50	(12)
2024–2026	Wieczysta Kraków	37	(8)
2026–	Xerez	13	(1)
- * Club domestic league appearances and goals as of 7 May 2026

Rafael González Rodríguez (born 13 February 1997), commonly known as Chuma, is a Spanish professional footballer who plays for Segunda Federación club Xerez as a forward.

== Club career ==
Chuma was born in Seville, Andalusia, and was a Sevilla FC youth graduate. He made his senior debut with the C-team on 3 May 2015, starting in a 2–1 Tercera División away win against Arcos CF, and scored his first goals seven days later by netting a brace in a 3–0 home defeat of CD Mairena.

On 27 July 2017, Chuma signed for UB Lebrijana also in the fourth division. He made his debut for the club on 27 August, starting and scoring a hat-trick in a 4–3 win at CD Gerena.

On 31 January 2018, after scoring 13 goals in only 20 appearances, Chuma joined Córdoba CF and was assigned to the reserves in Segunda División B. The transfer was declared void two days later, but it was later authorized by the RFEF.

Chuma made his professional debut on 12 May 2019, coming on as a late substitute for Federico Piovaccari in a 0–1 Segunda División away loss against UD Las Palmas, which ensured his team's relegation. On 18 July, he agreed to a two-year contract with Levante UD, being initially assigned to the reserves in division three.
