= UB Lebrijana =

Association football club in Spain

Lebrijana
- Full name: Unión Balompédica Lebrijana
- Nickname: La Balona
- Founded: 1928; 1993 (refounded)
- Ground: Municipal, Lebrija, Spain
- Capacity: 3,500
- President: (Spain) José Fuentes
- Head coach: (Spain) José Antonio Asián Cardo
- League: División de Honor – Group 1
- 2024–25: División de Honor – Group 1, 5th of 16
Home colours	Away colours

Unión Balompédica Lebrijana is a Spanish football team based in Lebrija, in the autonomous community of Andalusia. Founded in 1928, it currently plays in División de Honor – Group 1, holding home matches at Estadio Municipal de Lebrija, with a 3,500-seat capacity.

== Season to season ==
=== Old UB Lebrijana ===
Season	Tier	Division	Place	Copa del Rey
1928–1957	—	Regional	—	
1957–58	4	1ª Reg.	2nd	
1958–59	4	1ª Reg.	1st	
1959–60	3	3ª	11th	
1960–61	4	1ª Reg.	10th	
1961–1971	DNP			
1971–72	5	2ª Reg.	9th	
1972–73	5	2ª Reg.	1st	
1973–74	5	2ª Reg.	11th	
1974–75	5	2ª Reg.	11th	
1975–76	5	1ª Reg.	10th	
1976–77	5	1ª Reg.	13th	

Season	Tier	Division	Place	Copa del Rey
1977–78	6	1ª Reg.	11th	
1978–79	6	1ª Reg.	10th	
1979–80	6	1ª Reg.	8th	
1980–81	5	Reg. Pref.	5th	
1981–82	5	Reg. Pref.	19th	
1982–83	6	1ª Reg.	16th	
1983–84	6	1ª Reg.	16th	
1984–85	6	1ª Reg.	16th	
1985–86	6	1ª Reg.	4th	
1986–87	6	1ª Reg.	2nd	
1987–88	5	Reg. Pref.	2nd	

=== New UB Lebrijana ===
Season	Tier	Division	Place	Copa del Rey
1993–94	7	2ª Reg.	2nd	
1994–95	6	1ª Reg.	2nd	
1995–96	5	Reg. Pref.	11th	
1996–97	5	Reg. Pref.	3rd	
1997–98	5	Reg. Pref.	19th	
1998–99	6	1ª Reg.	5th	
1999–2000	5	Reg. Pref.	12th	
2000–01	5	Reg. Pref.	17th	
2001–02	6	1ª Reg.	2nd	
2002–03	6	1ª Reg.	1st	
2003–04	5	Reg. Pref.	16th	
2004–05	6	Reg. Pref.	13th	
2005–06	6	Reg. Pref.	10th	
2006–07	6	Reg. Pref.	15th	
2007–08	6	Reg. Pref.	10th	
2008–09	6	Reg. Pref.	9th	
2009–10	6	Reg. Pref.	11th	
2010–11	6	Reg. Pref.	4th	
2011–12	6	Reg. Pref.	1st	
2012–13	5	1ª And.	2nd	

Season	Tier	Division	Place	Copa del Rey
2013–14	4	3ª	9th	
2014–15	4	3ª	6th	
2015–16	4	3ª	15th	
2016–17	4	3ª	8th	
2017–18	4	3ª	5th	
2018–19	4	3ª	12th	
2019–20	4	3ª	13th	
2020–21	4	3ª	10th / 9th	
2021–22	6	Div. Hon.	13th	
2022–23	6	Div. Hon.	9th	
2023–24	6	Div. Hon.	7th	
2024–25	6	Div. Hon.	5th	
2025–26	6	Div. Hon.		

- 9 seasons in Tercera División
