= Alondras CF =

Association football club in Spain

Coordinates: 42.268927°N 8.782130°W

Alondras
- Full name: Alondras Club de Fútbol
- Nickname: Alondrista
- Founded: 6 December 1928; 97 years ago
- Stadium: Campo do Morrazo
- Capacity: 2,800
- President: Rafael Outeiral Graña
- Head coach: Rafa Villaverde
- League: Tercera Federación – Group 1
- 2025–26: Tercera Federación – Group 1, 12th of 18
Home colours	Away colours

Alondras Club de Fútbol is a football team based in Cangas in the autonomous community of Galicia. Founded in 1928 and refounded in 1951, it plays in Tercera Federación – Group 1. Its stadium is Estadio Campo do Morrazo with a capacity of 2,800 seats.

== History ==
=== Beginnings of football in Cangas ===
Football practice starts in Cangas around the year 1908, a period in which young people were looking anywhere organize their meetings. With a selection of these young people was created in 1914 that the Cangas FC disputa Limense in their parties, and we find a reference written in Faro de Vigo on 12 March 1920, due to play at Vigo in the field Coia of the Lamark, which lost by 5 to 1. Some names on this team are: Paredes, Julio, Ignacio, Columbus, XEX, Seijo, Luciano, Petouto, Gonzalo, Bermudez, Cervera, ... In 1922 he rents this equipment for the municipality land in the sands of Rodeiro for an amount of 200 pesetas a year.

Although this team was the most important, there were at the Villa as other teams: FC Lancia, Tuch FC, FC Union, Numancia, Sierra Morena, Morrazo, Baleata, Anduriña, Sisi FC, FC Yoyo, etc..

Over the years the field of Arenal Rodeiro inutilizando went and saw the need for a new one. The absence of field problems to find another confrontation between veterans and new players, led to the need to create a new club stronger, but something on which everyone agreed with a problem: the choice of name for the new club. Each name that suggested the veteran players, the newest responded with a different one. The solution was to face at a football match and the winners would put his name to the team, which lost pledging to respect it. The names were chosen and which were in dispute: "The punishment" and another "The Alondras." These names refer to two very popular works of a company varieties. Clearly won the supporters of "The Alondras" so this was the name of the new club began to face its history in the Moaña Leisure Maritime Meira 15 May 1928, the party won by 4 to 3.

At last on 6 December 1928 establishing the Alondras CF with the drafting of regulations and taking his first as a founding: Güido Paganini Picasso, Joe Smith Barros, Ramon Ocaña Larrin, Francisco Fernandez Cervera and Luciano Barreiro Fernandez. As curiosity can say that partner's children had to pay a monthly fee of 50 cents, partners and 5 number 1 peseta ESP partners protectors, as reflected in the regulations. In 1929 the club disputed different games considered "friendly", however striving to win, among them the victory 3–2 over the Ciosvin in Balaidos.

The club finished 2nd in the Group 1 of the Tercera División in the 2011-12 season.

== Season to season ==
Season	Tier	Division	Place	Copa del Rey
1951–1957	—	Regional	—	
1957–58	4	Serie A	5th	
1958–59	4	Serie A	5th	
1959–60	4	Serie A	4th	
1960–61	4	Serie A	1st	
1961–62	3	3ª	10th	
1962–63	3	3ª	5th	
1963–64	3	3ª	10th	
1964–65	3	3ª	6th	
1965–66	3	3ª	12th	
1966–67	3	3ª	14th	
1967–68	3	3ª	8th	
1968–69	3	3ª	15th	
1969–70	3	3ª	18th	First round
1970–71	4	Serie A	4th	
1971–72	4	Serie A	6th	
1972–73	4	Serie A	8th	
1973–74	4	Serie A	11th	
1974–75	4	Serie A	8th	
1975–76	4	Serie A	6th	

Season	Tier	Division	Place	Copa del Rey
1976–77	4	Serie A	13th	
1977–78	5	Serie A	1st	
1978–79	4	3ª	7th	First round
1979–80	4	3ª	5th	First round
1980–81	4	3ª	4th	First round
1981–82	4	3ª	10th	First round
1982–83	4	3ª	8th	
1983–84	4	3ª	16th	
1984–85	4	3ª	15th	
1985–86	4	3ª	7th	
1986–87	4	3ª	12th	First round
1987–88	4	3ª	13th	
1988–89	4	3ª	17th	
1989–90	5	Reg. Pref.	1st	
1990–91	4	3ª	16th	
1991–92	4	3ª	17th	
1992–93	5	Reg. Pref.	2nd	
1993–94	5	Reg. Pref.	11th	
1994–95	5	Reg. Pref.	5th	
1995–96	5	Reg. Pref.	12th	

Season	Tier	Division	Place	Copa del Rey
1996–97	5	Reg. Pref.	3rd	
1997–98	5	Reg. Pref.	2nd	
1998–99	4	3ª	14th	
1999–2000	4	3ª	11th	
2000–01	4	3ª	5th	
2001–02	4	3ª	2nd	
2002–03	4	3ª	17th	First round
2003–04	5	Reg. Pref.	2nd	
2004–05	4	3ª	13th	
2005–06	4	3ª	4th	
2006–07	4	3ª	9th	
2007–08	4	3ª	7th	
2008–09	4	3ª	8th	
2009–10	4	3ª	6th	
2010–11	4	3ª	6th	
2011–12	4	3ª	2nd	
2012–13	4	3ª	9th	
2013–14	4	3ª	12th	
2014–15	4	3ª	10th	
2015–16	4	3ª	7th	

Season	Tier	Division	Place	Copa del Rey
2016–17	4	3ª	14th	
2017–18	4	3ª	4th	
2018–19	4	3ª	4th	
2019–20	4	3ª	16th	
2020–21	4	3ª	3rd / 6th	
2021–22	5	3ª RFEF	9th	
2022–23	5	3ª Fed.	6th	
2023–24	5	3ª Fed.	11th	
2024–25	5	3ª Fed.	7th	
2025–26	5	3ª Fed.	12th	
2026–27	5	3ª Fed.		

- 44 seasons in Tercera División
- 6 seasons in Tercera Federación/Tercera División RFEF

== Stadium ==
The Campo do Morrazo, owned by Alondras CF and recently reformed, is the stadium where the club plays its home games since 19 March 1971.
