= Son Ferriol =

Coordinates: 39.574920°N 2.714931°E

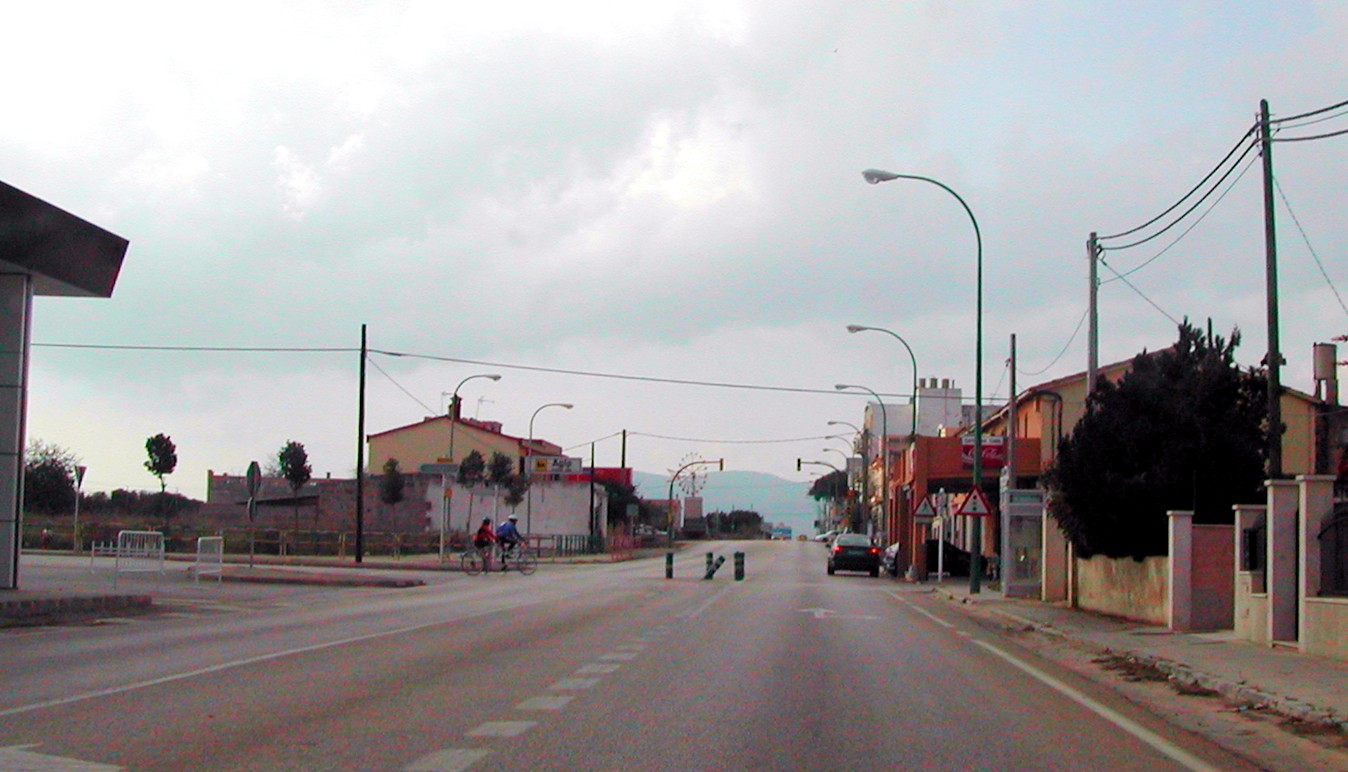

Son Ferriol is a town within the municipal borough of Palma in Mallorca. It is situated 6 km from the centre of Palma, between La Creu Vermella and Son Banya. At the north-eastern edge of the town there is the hamlet of S'Hostalot.

== History ==
Farming was the main source of wealth in the Sant Jordi and s'Horta regions. On the 1785 map by cardenal Despuig, there are the possessions (estates) of Son Ferriol, which appear in documentation from 1713.

Houses began to be built in 1898 by Bartomeu Oliver when a plot of land was acquired from the Son Sant Joan estate, where a cafe, shop, barber's, ironsmith's and carpenter's were built. This became the basis for the houses around the present Can Tunis cafe on the main road to Manacor.

Son Ferriol itself came into full existence in 1917, when the priest Bartomeu Font bought the estate from Anna M. Bonafé and the present street layout began in 1920. Public buildings such as the church and public school (1925) date back to this time.
