= 2024–25 Copa del Rey =

Tournament details
- Country: Spain
- Date: 9 October 2024 – 26 April 2025
- Teams: 125

Final positions
- Champions: Barcelona (32nd title)
- Runners-up: Real Madrid

Tournament statistics
- Matches played: 126
- Goals scored: 381 (3.02 per match)
- Top goal scorer(s): Ferran Torres (6 goals)

The 2024–25 Copa del Rey (branded as the Copa del Rey MAPFRE for sponsorship reasons), was the 123rd staging of the Copa del Rey (including two seasons where two rival editions were played). Both the winners and the runners-up qualified for the four-team 2026 Supercopa de España.

Athletic Bilbao were the defending champions, having beaten Mallorca in the final of the previous edition, but were eliminated in the round of 16 by Osasuna.

The final was held at La Cartuja in Seville between Barcelona and Real Madrid on 26 April 2025, with the Catalans defeating their rivals 3–2 after extra time for a record-extending 32nd title. As winners, Barcelona were assured a place in the 2025–26 UEFA Europa League league phase; however, since they had already qualified for European competition via league standings, their place was passed down to the seventh-placed team in La Liga and the UEFA Conference League spot reserved for the seventh-placed team was awarded to the team who finished eighth in the league.

As across Spain, match times up to 26 October 2024 and from 30 March 2025 are CEST (UTC+2). Times on interim ("winter") days are CET (UTC+1). Matches played in the Canary Islands use the WET (UTC±00:00).

== Schedule and format ==
In the summer of 2024, the RFEF released the calendar of the competition and confirmed the format of the previous season would remain.

Round	Draw date	Date	Fixtures	Clubs	Format details
Preliminary round	16 September 2024	9 October 2024	10	125 → 115	New entries: Clubs qualified through the 2023–24 sixth tier. Opponents seeding: Teams faced each other according to proximity criteria. Local team seeding: Luck of the draw. Knock-out tournament type: Single match.
First round	10 October 2024	29–31 October 2024	55	115 → 60	New entries: All qualified teams except for the four participants in the Supercopa de España and champions of the 2023–24 Primera Federación. Opponents seeding: Teams from lowest divisions faced La Liga teams. Local team seeding: Matches were played at home stadiums of teams in lower divisions. Knock-out tournament type: Single match.
Second round	27 November 2024	3–5 December 2024	28	60 → 32	New entries: 2023–24 Primera Federación champions enter at this stage. Opponents seeding: Teams from lowest divisions faced La Liga teams. Local team seeding: Matches were played at home stadiums of teams in lower divisions. Knock-out tournament type: Single match.
Round of 32	9 December 2024	3–7 January 2025	16	32 → 16	New entries: Clubs participating in the Supercopa de España entered at this stage. Opponents seeding: Teams from lowest divisions faced La Liga teams. Local team seeding: Matches were played at home stadiums of teams in lower divisions. Knock-out tournament type: Single match.
Round of 16	8 January 2025	14–16 January 2025	8	16 → 8	Opponents seeding: Teams from lowest divisions face La Liga teams. Local team seeding: Matches were played at home stadiums of teams in lower divisions. Knock-out tournament type: Single match.
Quarter-finals	20 January 2025	4–6 February 2025	4	8 → 4	Opponents seeding: Luck of the draw. Local team seeding: Matches were played at home stadiums of teams in lower divisions. Knock-out tournament type: Single match.
Semi-finals	12 February 2025	25–26 February 2025	2	4 → 2	Opponents seeding: Luck of the draw. Local team seeding: Luck of the draw. Knock-out tournament type: Double match.
Semi-finals	12 February 2025	1–2 April 2025	2	4 → 2	Opponents seeding: Luck of the draw. Local team seeding: Luck of the draw. Knock-out tournament type: Double match.
Final	12 February 2025	26 April 2025	1	2 → 1	Single match at Estadio de La Cartuja, Seville. Both teams qualified for the 2026 Supercopa de España. UEFA Europa League qualification: winners qualified for the 2025–26 UEFA Europa League league phase.

Notes

- Games ending in a draw were decided in extra time and, if still level, by a penalty shoot-out.

== Qualified teams ==
The following teams qualified for the competition. Reserve teams were not allowed to enter.

La Liga; All 20 teams of the 2023–24 season	Segunda División; All 21 non-reserve teams of the 2023–24 season	Primera Federación; Top five non-reserve teams of each group of the 2023–24 season	Segunda Federación; Top five non-reserve teams of the five groups of the 2023–24 season	Tercera Federación; The best non-reserve teams plus the best seven non-reserve runners-up of each one of the eighteen groups of the 2023–24 season	Copa Federación; The four semi-finalists of the 2024 Copa Federación de España	Regional leagues The best non-promoted teams of the twenty groups of the sixth tier in the 2023–24 season
Alavés; Almería; Athletic Bilbao^{TH} (Note: Athletic Bilbao, Barcelona, Mallorca and Real Madrid joined the tournament in the round of 32 as participants of the Supercopa de España.); Atlético Madrid; Barcelona; Cádiz; Celta Vigo; Getafe; Girona; Granada; Las Palmas; Mallorca; Osasuna; Rayo Vallecano; Real Betis; Real Madrid; Real Sociedad; Sevilla; Valencia; Villarreal	Albacete; Alcorcón; Amorebieta; Andorra; Burgos; Cartagena; Eibar; Elche; Eldense; Espanyol; Huesca; Leganés; Levante; Mirandés; Oviedo; Racing Ferrol; Racing Santander; Sporting Gijón; Tenerife; Valladolid; Zaragoza	Castellón; Ceuta; Córdoba; Cultural Leonesa; Deportivo La Coruña (Note: Deportivo La Coruña joined the tournament in the second round as champions of the 2023–24 Primera Federación.); Gimnàstic; Ibiza; Málaga; Ponferradina; Unionistas	Águilas; Atlético Paso; Badalona Futur; Barakaldo; Barbastro; Cacereño; Estepona; Europa; Gimnástica Segoviana; Guijuelo; Hércules; Langreo; Lleida; UD Logroñés; Marbella; Numancia; Orihuela; Ourense CF; Pontevedra; SS Reyes; Sant Andreu; Tudelano; Utebo; Yeclano; Zamora	Alfaro; Ávila; Beasain; Bergantiños; Ciudad de Lucena; Conquense; Coria; Cortes; Cuarte; Don Benito; Ejea; Escobedo; Ibiza Islas Pitiusas; Jaén; Jove Español; Juventud Torremolinos; L'Hospitalet; Lanzarote; Laredo; Llanera; Minera; Móstoles URJC; Olot; Salamanca; Xerez	Compostela; Extremadura; Las Rozas; Poblense	Astur; Aurrerá de Vitoria; Baztán; Ceuta 6 de Junio; Chiclana; Dolorense; Gévora (Note: Fútbol Playa Badajoz qualified to the competition as the champions of the Copa Extremadura in June, but lost their spot after not registering in any competition due to debts in July.); Manises; Melilla CD; Ontiñena; Playas de Sotavento; Parla Escuela; Promesas EDF; San Pedro; San Tirso; Selaya; Sonseca; Sporting de Mahón; Vic; Villamuriel

== Preliminary round ==
=== Draw ===
Teams were divided into four groups according to geographical criteria.

Group 1	Group 2	Group 3	Group 4
Astur; Aurrerá de Vitoria; Promesas EDF; San Tirso; Selaya; Villamuriel	Baztán; Ontiñena; Sporting de Mahón; Vic	Ceuta 6 de Junio; Chiclana; Dolorense; Manises; Melilla CD; San Pedro	Gévora; Playas de Sotavento; Parla Escuela; Sonseca

=== Matches ===
9 October 2024	San Tirso (6)	1–1 (a.e.t.) (5–3 p)	Selaya (6)	Abegondo
17:30	Gómez 42'	Report	Tejero 6'	Stadium: O Monte; Attendance: 1,000; Referee: Mhand Agoultim Boumater
	Penalties
	Segade (penalty scored); Denis (penalty scored); Meijide (penalty scored); Antón (penalty scored); Ares (penalty scored)		(penalty missed) Jiménez; (penalty scored) Verdú; (penalty scored) Ortíz; (penalty scored) Revuelta

9 October 2024	Sonseca (6)	0–1 (a.e.t.)	Parla Escuela (6)	Sonseca
18:30		Report	Greciano 99'	Stadium: Martín Juanes; Attendance: 1,300; Referee: Víctor Laín Pérez

9 October 2024	Astur (6)	2–0	Promesas EDF (6)	Oviedo
19:00	Iglesias 50', 83'	Report		Stadium: Hermanos Llana; Attendance: 500; Referee: Ricardo Álvarez Estrada

9 October 2024	Baztán (6)	1–1 (a.e.t.) (2–4 p)	Ontiñena (6)	Elizondo
19:00	Goñi 36'	Report	Roses 10'	Stadium: Giltxaurdi; Attendance: 1,000; Referee: Julen Fermín Escalero Alzaga

9 October 2024	San Pedro (6)	4–2	Ceuta 6 de Junio (6)	San Pedro de Alcántara
19:00	Francisco 23'; Carmona 26'; Basiliio 90+2' (o.g.); Oliva 90+8'	Report	Hamad Bujiar 35'; Laarbi 68'	Stadium: Antonio Naranjo; Attendance: 4,500; Referee: Pavlo Ivaskiv Oliynyk

9 October 2024	Villamuriel (6)	1–0	Aurrerá de Vitoria (6)	Villamuriel de Cerrato
19:30	Chemby 70'	Report		Stadium: Rafael Vázquez Sedano; Attendance: 1,750; Referee: Adrián Pinilla Serrano

9 October 2024	Dolorense (8)	1–3	Manises (6)	Cartagena
20:00	Karachi 61'	Report	Trilles 41'; Cantero 55'; Cahmpi 80'	Stadium: San Juan Bosco; Attendance: 600; Referee: Miguel Díaz-Portales Ruiz

9 October 2024	Vic (6)	4–0	Sporting de Mahón (6)	Vic
20:30	Riera Camps 2'; Bertrana 34'; Bellido Pujol 64'; Prat 85'	Report		Stadium: Hipòlit Planàs Stadium; Attendance: 1,700; Referee: Mihaita Marius Haghiac

9 October 2024	Gévora (6)	1–1 (a.e.t.) (4–2 p)	Playas de Sotavento (6)	Gévora
20:30	Adri Gonzalez 86'	Report	Sosa 10'	Stadium: Municipal; Attendance: 1,500; Referee: Alfredo Vázquez Hidalgo

9 October 2024	Chiclana (6)	4–0	Melilla CD (6)	Chiclana
21:00	Caballero 33'; Dani 37'; Juanito 52'; Pascual 83'	Report		Stadium: Estadio Municipal; Attendance: 3,000; Referee: Carlos Agraz Díaz

== First round ==
The first round was played by 110 of the 115 qualified teams, with the exceptions being the four participants of the 2025 Supercopa de España, and the Primera RFEF champions. The ten winners from the previous preliminary round were paired with ten teams from La Liga. The four Copa Federación semi-finalists were drawn with the other four teams from La Liga, and the last two La Liga teams were drawn with two teams from the Tercera RFEF. Six teams from the Tercera RFEF were paired with six teams from the Segunda División. Fifteen teams from Segunda RFEF were paired with fifteen teams from the Segunda División. Then, sixteen teams from the Segunda RFEF were paired with sixteen teams from the Primera RFEF. Finally, four teams from Segunda RFEF were paired with each other.

A total of 55 matches were played between 29 October and 26 November 2024.

=== Draw ===
The draw for the first round was held on 10 October 2024. Teams were divided into seven pots.

Pot 1; 16 teams of La Liga	Pot 2; 21 teams of Segunda División	Pot 3; 16 teams of Primera Federación	Pot 4; 35 teams of Segunda Federación	Pot 5; 8 teams of Tercera Federación	Pot 6; 4 teams qualified through the Copa Federación	Pot 7; 10 winners of the preliminary round
Alavés; Atlético Madrid; Celta Vigo; Espanyol; Getafe; Girona; Las Palmas; Leganés; Osasuna; Rayo Vallecano; Real Betis; Real Sociedad; Sevilla; Valencia; Valladolid; Villarreal	Albacete; Almería; Burgos; Cádiz; Cartagena; Castellón; Córdoba; Eibar; Elche; Eldense; Granada; Huesca; Levante; Málaga; Mirandés; Oviedo; Racing Ferrol; Racing Santander; Sporting Gijón; Tenerife; Zaragoza	Alcorcón; Amorebieta; Andorra; Barakaldo; Ceuta; Cultural Leonesa; Gimnàstic; Gimnástica Segoviana; Hércules; Ibiza; Marbella; Ourense CF; Ponferradina; Unionistas; Yeclano; Zamora	Águilas; Alfaro; Atlético Paso; Ávila; Badalona Futur; Barbastro; Bergantiños; Cacereño; Conquense; Coria; Don Benito; Ejea; Escobedo; Estepona; Europa; Guijuelo; Ibiza Islas Pitiusas; Juventud Torremolinos; Langreo; Laredo; Llanera; Lleida; UD Logroñés; Minera; Móstoles URJC; Numancia; Olot; Orihuela; Pontevedra; SS Reyes; Sant Andreu; Salamanca; Tudelano; Utebo; Xerez	Beasain; Ciudad de Lucena; Cortes; Cuarte; Jaén; Jove Español; L'Hospitalet; Lanzarote	Compostela; Extremadura; Las Rozas; Poblense	Astur; Chiclana; Gévora; Manises; Parla Escuela; Ontiñena; San Pedro; San Tirso; Vic; Villamuriel

=== Matches ===
29 October 2024	Villamuriel (6)	0–5	Rayo Vallecano (1)	Palencia (Note: Villamuriel did not play the match in their main stadium Municipal Rafael Vázquez Sedano, Villamuriel de Cerrato, as it did not meet the broadcasting requirements.)
19:00		Report	De Tomás 43' (pen.), 48'; Trejo 45'; Guardiola 68'; Eto'o 88'	Stadium: Nueva Balastera; Attendance: 8,000; Referee: Ricardo de Burgos Bengoetxea

29 October 2024	Compostela (4)	0–1	Alavés (1)	Santiago de Compostela
19:00		Report	Vidal 12' (o.g.)	Stadium: San Lázaro; Attendance: 7,400; Referee: Mateo Busquets Ferrer

29 October 2024	Lanzarote (5)	3–4	Racing Santander (2)	Tías (Note: Lanzarote did not play the match in their main stadium Ciudad Deportiva, Arrecife, as it did not meet the broadcasting requirements.)
20:00 WET	Fuentes 42', 78', 81'	Report	Karrikaburu 32'; Ekain 39'; Arévalo 74'; Camara 76'	Stadium: Pancho Bermúdez; Attendance: 800; Referee: Rubén Ávalos Barrera

29 October 2024	Guijuelo (4)	1–2	Ourense CF (3)	Guijuelo
20:00		Report		Stadium: Estadio Municipal; Attendance: 250; Referee: Rubén Ruipérez Marín

29 October 2024	Astur (6)	1–4	Valladolid (1)	Oviedo
21:00		Report		Stadium: Hermanos Llana; Attendance: 1,500; Referee: Alejandro Muñíz Ruiz

29 October 2024	Poblense (5)	1–6	Villarreal (1)	Sa Pobla
21:00	Pons 67'	Report	Terrats 10'; Pérez 27', 35', 44'; Cabanes 38'; Gueye 57'	Stadium: Nou Camp; Attendance: 3,400; Referee: Miguel Ángel Ortiz Arias

29 October 2024	Jaén (5)	0–3	Cádiz (2)	Jaén
21:00		Report		Stadium: Nuevo La Victoria; Attendance: 7,469; Referee: Saúl Ais Reig

29 October 2024	L'Hospitalet (5)	1–5	Zaragoza (2)	L'Hospitalet de Llobregat
21:00		Report		Stadium: Municipal de L'Hospitalet; Attendance: 6,740; Referee: Andrés Fuentes Molina

30 October 2024	Europa (4)	2–1	Albacete (2)	Barcelona
18:30	Neeskens 7'; Pimentel 68'	Report	Morcillo 82'	Stadium: Nou Sardenya; Attendance: 3,724; Referee: Salvador Lax Franco

30 October 2024	Las Rozas (5)	0–3	Sevilla (1)	Las Rozas
19:00		Report	Méndez 40' (o.g.); Iheanacho 61', 79'	Stadium: Navalcarbón; Attendance: 968; Referee: Pablo González Fuertes

30 October 2024	Ciudad de Lucena (5)	1–2	Leganés (1)	Lucena
19:00	Agudo 45+1'	Report	Munir 42'; Cruz 52'	Stadium: Ciudad de Lucena; Attendance: 2,600; Referee: Javier Alberola Rojas

30 October 2024	Olot (4)	1–1 (a.e.t.) (4–3 p)	Córdoba (2)	Olot
19:00	Peñalver 76'	Report	Soonsup-Bell 26'	Stadium: Municipal; Attendance: 3,000; Referee: Álvaro Moreno Aragón

30 October 2024	Ibiza Islas Pitiusas (4)	1–2	Gimnàstic (3)	Ibiza
19:00	Bengoetxea 88'	Report	Sanz 10'; Jiménez 23'	Stadium: Sánchez y Vivancos; Attendance: 500; Referee: Jerónimo Montes García-Navas

30 October 2024	Beasain (5)	0–1	Cartagena (2)	Beasain
19:30		Report	Muñoz 90'	Stadium: Loinaz; Attendance: 1,000; Referee: Miguel Sesma Espinosa

30 October 2024	Móstoles URJC (4)	2–5	Burgos (2)	Móstoles
19:30	García 25'; López 70'	Report	González 32'; Arroyo 34'; Sancris 50'; Niño 51'; Miguel 66'	Stadium: Estadio El Soto; Attendance: 2,000; Referee: Sergiu Claudiu Muresan

30 October 2024	Bergantiños (4)	1–2	Marbella (3)	Carballo
19:30	Ouhdadi 64'	Report	Dorian Jr. 16', 23'	Stadium: As Eiroas; Attendance: 500; Referee: Francisco García Riesgo

30 October 2024	Langreo (4)	1–2 (a.e.t.)	Orihuela (4)	Langreo
19:30	Silva 73' (pen.)	Report	Chuli 87'; Miranda 111'	Stadium: Ganzábal; Attendance: 1,000; Referee: Alberto Aranda Bujedo

30 October 2024	Cortes (5)	0–2	Granada (2)	Tudela (Note: Cortes did not play the match in their main stadium San Francisco Javier, Cortes, as it did not meet the broadcasting requirements.)
20:00		Report	Weissman 31'; Salas 67' (o.g.)	Stadium: Ciudad de Tudela; Attendance: 2,000; Referee: Eder Mallo Fernández

30 October 2024	Sant Andreu (4)	2–1	Mirandés (2)	Barcelona
20:00	Lucas 14'; Paredes 66'	Report	Homenchenko 25' (pen.)	Stadium: Narcís Sala; Attendance: 5,139; Referee: Rafael Sánchez López

30 October 2024	Badalona Futur (4)	0–2	Huesca (2)	Premià de Dalt
20:00		Report	Unzueta 23' (pen.); Bejarano 64'	Stadium: Estadi Municipal; Attendance: 1,000; Referee: José Antonio Sánchez Villalobos

30 October 2024	UD Logroñés (4)	1–0 (a.e.t.)	Eibar (2)	Logroño
20:00	Arnau 108'	Report		Stadium: Estadio Las Gaunas; Attendance: 3,422; Referee: Oliver De La Fuente Ramos

30 October 2024	Numancia (4)	0–1	Sporting Gijón (2)	Soria
20:00		Report	Oyón 61'	Stadium: Los Pajaritos; Attendance: 3,303; Referee: Dámaso Arcediano Monescillo

30 October 2024	Utebo (4)	0–4	Unionistas (3)	Utebo
20:00		Report	Rabadán 12', 15', 41'; Martínez 45'	Stadium: Santa Ana; Attendance: 300; Referee: Gerard Brull Acerete

30 October 2024	Laredo (4)	0–6	Yeclano (3)	Laredo
20:00		Report	de Pedro 2'; Relu 27', 62'; Naranjo 38'; Senestrari 83'; Serpeta 86'	Stadium: Campo de Fútbol San Lorenzo; Attendance: 1,500; Referee: Aimar Velasco Arbaiza

30 October 2024	Juventud Torremolinos (4)	1–2	Zamora (3)	Torremolinos
20:00	Altube 40' (o.g.)	Report	Campabadal 45+1'; Lucero 84'	Stadium: El Pozuelo; Attendance: 1,500; Referee: Alejandro Ojaos Valera

30 October 2024	Escobedo (4)	0–0 (4–5 p)	Ponferradina (3)	Muriedas (Note: Escobedo did not play the match in their main stadium Eusebio Arce, Escobedo, as it did not meet the broadcasting requirements.)
20:00		Report		Stadium: La Maruca; Attendance: 1,700; Referee: Millan Bárcenas Torres

30 October 2024	Lleida (4)	1–3	Barakaldo (3)	Lleida
20:00	Cortijo 69'	Report	Revilla 38'; Santiago 65', 82'	Stadium: Camp d'Esports; Attendance: 1,300; Referee: Armando Ramo Andrés

30 October 2024	Salamanca (4)	1–0	Alcorcón (3)	Villares de la Reina
20:00	Caramelo 81'	Report		Stadium: Estadio Helmántico; Attendance: 4,200; Referee: Javier Figueiredo Comesaña

30 October 2024	Atlético Paso (4)	0–1	Eldense (2)	El Paso
20:30 WET		Report	Ropero 43' (pen.)	Stadium: Municipal; Attendance: 827; Referee: Daniel Palencia Caballero

30 October 2024	Coria (4)	0–3	Elche (2)	Coria
20:30		Report	Gaspar 15'; Mourad 26'; Álvarez 82'	Stadium: Estadio La Isla; Attendance: 1,400; Referee: José Luis Guzmán Mansilla

30 October 2024	Cacereño (4)	2–1 (a.e.t.)	Gimnástica Segoviana (3)	Cáceres
20:30	Pérez 8'; Martínez 103' (pen.)	Report	Manu 84'	Stadium: Príncipe Felipe; Attendance: 2,532; Referee: Francisco Javier Expósito Jaramillo

30 October 2024	Conquense (4)	1–0	Ibiza (3)	Cuenca
20:30	Caballero 68'	Report		Stadium: La Fuensanta; Attendance: 3,000; Referee: Fernando Bueno Prieto

30 October 2024	San Pedro (6)	1–5	Celta Vigo (1)	San Pedro de Alcántara
21:00	Carmona 15'	Report	Alfon 4'; Durán 18'; Allende 41'; Douvikas 61', 83'	Stadium: Antonio Naranjo; Attendance: 5,000; Referee: Juan Luis Pulido Santana

30 October 2024	Extremadura (5)	0–4	Girona (1)	Almendralejo
21:00		Report	Gil 12'; Miovski 58', 62'; Martínez 76'	Stadium: Estadio Francisco de la Hera; Attendance: 6,865; Referee: José Luis Munuera Montero

30 October 2024	SS Reyes (4)	1–2	Almería (2)	San Sebastián de los Reyes
21:00	Tito 22'	Report	Puigmal 39', 42'	Stadium: Nuevo Matapiñonera; Attendance: 1,400; Referee: Iosu Galech Apezteguía

30 October 2024	Águilas (4)	0–1	Castellón (2)	Águilas
21:00		Report	Seuntjens 73'	Stadium: El Rubial; Attendance: 2,000; Referee: Manuel Ángel Pérez Hernández

31 October 2024	Vic (6)	0–2	Atlético Madrid (1)	Vic
19:00		Report	Alvarez 81' (pen.), 89'	Stadium: Hipòlit Planàs Stadium; Attendance: 6,300; Referee: Guillermo Cuadra Fernández

31 October 2024	San Tirso (6)	0–4	Espanyol (1)	A Coruña (Note: San Tirso did not play the match in their main stadium O Monte, Abegondo, as it did not meet the broadcasting requirements.)
19:00		Report	Véliz 54', 86', 90+1'; Cardona 85'	Stadium: Riazor; Attendance: 3,041; Referee: Adrián Cordero Vega

31 October 2024	Barbastro (4)	4–0	Amorebieta (3)	Barbastro
19:00	de Mesa 55', 74'; Barrera 62', 69' (pen.)	Report		Stadium: Municipal de Deportes; Attendance: 800; Referee: Gonzalo Romero Freixas

31 October 2024	Ávila (4)	0–0 (a.e.t.) (3–0 p)	Oviedo (2)	Ávila
20:00		Report		Stadium: Estadio Adolfo Suárez; Attendance: 3,000; Referee: Manuel Jesús Orellana Cid
	Penalties
	Martín (penalty scored); Carrión (penalty scored); Rivas (penalty scored)		(penalty missed) Colombatto; (penalty missed) Lemos; (penalty missed) Moyano

31 October 2024	Tudelano (4)	0–5	Minera (4)	Tudela
20:00		Report	Pujante 12'; Britos 31'; Vera 57'; Perdomo 83'; Martínez 90+1'	Stadium: Ciudad de Tudela; Attendance: 4,000; Referee: Adrián Calvo Martínez

31 October 2024	Don Benito (4)	1–2	Andorra (3)	Don Benito
20:30	Tapia 16'	Report	Dione 7'; Clemente 78'	Stadium: Vicente Sanz; Attendance: 1,600; Referee: Gonzalo González Páez

31 October 2024	Gévora (6)	1–6	Real Betis (1)	Almendralejo (Note: Gévora did not play the match in their main stadium Municipal de Gévora, Gévora, as it did not meet the broadcasting requirements.)
21:00	Juanma 90+1' (pen.)	Report	Altimira 6'; Diao 26'; Bakambu 28'; Juanmi 68'; Vitor Roque 79', 87'	Stadium: Estadio Francisco de la Hera; Attendance: 8,724; Referee: José María Sánchez Martínez

31 October 2024	Ontiñena (6)	0–7	Las Palmas (1)	Monzón (Note: Ontiñena did not play the match in their main stadium El Balsal, Ontiñena, as it did not meet the broadcasting requirements.)
21:00		Report	Mata 19', 68', 85', 88'; Cardona 74'; Herzog 77'; Fuster 90'	Stadium: Isidro Calderón; Attendance: 1,900; Referee: Víctor García Verdura

31 October 2024	Cuarte (5)	1–3	Racing Ferrol (2)	Cuarte de Huerva
21:00	Solbes 90+2'	Report	Vallejo 8' (pen.); Jauregi 32'; Giménez 63' (pen.)	Stadium: Nuevo Municipal; Attendance: 600; Referee: Jon Ander González Esteban

31 October 2024	Estepona (4)	3–2 (a.e.t.)	Málaga (2)	La Línea (Note: Estepona did not play the match in their main stadium Municipal Francisco Muñoz Pérez, Estepona, as it did not meet the broadcasting requirements.)
21:00		Report		Stadium: Municipal; Attendance: 3,000; Referee: Germán Cid Camacho

31 October 2024	Alfaro (4)	0–2 (a.e.t.)	Tenerife (2)	Alfaro
21:00		Report		Stadium: La Molineta; Attendance: 800; Referee: Carlos Muñiz Muñoz

31 October 2024	Llanera (4)	0–2 (a.e.t.)	Cultural Leonesa (3)	Pola de Siero (Note: Llanera did not play the match in their main stadium Pepe Quimarán, Llanera, as it did not meet the broadcasting requirements.)
21:00		Report		Stadium: El Bayu; Attendance: 1,700; Referee: Álvaro Juncal Moreira

5 November 2024	Chiclana (6)	0–5	Osasuna (1)	Chiclana de la Frontera
19:00		Report	García 50', 80'; Benito 54' (pen.); Arnaiz 71'; Gómez 77'	Stadium: Estadio Municipal; Attendance: 5,000; Referee: Francisco José Hernández Maeso

6 November 2024	Xerez (4)	0–1	Ceuta (3)	Jerez de la Frontera
19:00		Report	Aquino 7'	Stadium: Municipal de Chapín; Attendance: 4,023; Referee: Daniel Miranda Bolaño

14 November 2024	Ejea (4)	1–0	Hércules (3)	Ejea de los Caballeros
18:00	Puertolas 70'	Report		Stadium: Luchán; Attendance: 1,600; Referee: Gorka Etayo Herrera

19 November 2024	Pontevedra (4)	4–1	Levante (2)	Pontevedra
20:00	Litri 24'; Fontán 57'; Castellano 90+1'; Pino 90+6'	Report	Morales 72'	Stadium: Pasarón; Attendance: 3,837; Referee: Miguel González Díaz

21 November 2024	Jove Español (5)	0–5	Real Sociedad (1)	Alicante (Note: Jove Español did not play the match in their main stadium Ciudad Deportiva, San Vicente del Raspeig, as it did not meet the broadcasting requirements.)
21:00		Report	Barrenetxea 12', 15'; Gómez 38'; Magunazelaia 44'; Goti 78'	Stadium: José Rico Pérez; Attendance: 6,000; Referee: Alejandro Quintero González

26 November 2024	Parla Escuela (6)	0–1	Valencia (1)	Parla
19:00		Report	Pepelu 20'	Stadium: Las Américas; Attendance: 4,300; Referee: Mario Melero López

26 November 2024	Manises (6)	0–3	Getafe (1)	Manises
19:00		Report	Yıldırım 32', 45'; Peter 42'	Stadium: Municipal; Attendance: 4,000; Referee: César Soto Grado

== Second round ==
The second round was played by 56 teams, with the four participants of the 2025 Supercopa de España having a bye. The Primera RFEF champion, Deportivo La Coruña, entered in this round. Fourteen Segunda Federación teams were paired with fourteen La Liga teams. Two teams from Primera Federación were paired with the two remaining La Liga teams. Nine teams from Primera Federación were paired with nine Segunda División teams. The six remaining Segunda División teams were paired with each other.

A total of 28 matches were played between 3 and 5 December 2024.

=== Draw ===
The draw for the second round was held on 27 November 2024. Teams were divided into four pots.

Pot 1; 16 teams of La Liga	Pot 2; 15 teams of Segunda División	Pot 3; 11 teams of Primera Federación	Pot 4; 14 teams of Segunda Federación
Atlético Madrid; Alavés; Celta Vigo; Espanyol; Getafe; Girona; Las Palmas; Leganés; Osasuna; Rayo Vallecano; Real Betis; Real Sociedad; Sevilla; Valencia; Valladolid; Villarreal	Almería; Burgos; Cádiz; Cartagena; Castellón; Deportivo La Coruña; Elche; Eldense; Granada; Huesca; Racing Ferrol; Racing Santander; Sporting Gijón; Tenerife; Zaragoza	Andorra; Barakaldo; Ceuta; Cultural Leonesa; Gimnàstic; Marbella; Ourense CF; Ponferradina; Unionistas; Yeclano; Zamora	Ávila; Barbastro; Cacereño; Conquense; Ejea; Estepona; Europa; UD Logroñés; Minera; Olot; Orihuela; Pontevedra; Salamanca; Sant Andreu

=== Matches ===
3 December 2024	Ávila (4)	2–4 (a.e.t.)	Valladolid (1)	Ávila
19:00	Adri Carrión 49', 54'	Report	Latasa 15'; Marcos André 73', 111', 119'	Stadium: Adolfo Suárez; Attendance: 4,689; Referee: Alejandro Quintero González

3 December 2024	Yeclano (3)	0–1	Elche (2)	Yecla
20:00		Report	Plano 70'	Stadium: La Constitución; Attendance: 4,500; Referee: José Antonio Sánchez Villalobos

3 December 2024	Barbastro (4)	2–0	Espanyol (1)	Barbastro
21:00	Barrera 55' (pen.), 81'	Report		Stadium: Municipal de Deportes; Attendance: 1,500; Referee: Javier Alberola Rojas

3 December 2024	Salamanca (4)	0–7	Celta Vigo (1)	Villares de la Reina
21:00		Report	Swedberg 5'; Sotelo 36' (pen.); Durán 43'; Allende 65'; Domínguez 69'; López 78', 89'	Stadium: Helmántico; Attendance: 10,500; Referee: Adrián Cordero Vega

3 December 2024	Zaragoza (2)	2–2 (a.e.t.) (4–5 p)	Granada (2)	Zaragoza
21:00	Ares 18', 48'	Report	Weissman 42'; Clemente 45' (o.g.)	Stadium: La Romareda; Attendance: 10,153; Referee: Germán Cid Camacho
	Penalties
	Serrano (penalty scored); Calero (penalty scored); Luna (penalty scored); Clemente (penalty missed); Bare (penalty scored); Mañas (penalty missed)		(penalty scored) Villar; (penalty scored) Ruiz; (penalty missed) Weissman; (penalty scored) Zidane; (penalty scored) Tsitaishvili; (penalty scored) Rubio

3 December 2024	Europa (4)	1–2	Las Palmas (1)	Barcelona
21:15	Mahicas 55'	Report	McBurnie 48', 75'	Stadium: Nou Sardenya; Attendance: 4,018; Referee: Mario Melero López

4 December 2024	Sant Andreu (4)	1–3	Real Betis (1)	Barcelona
19:00	Serrano 36'	Report	Ávila 26'; Bartra 79'; Ezzalzouli 90+6'	Stadium: Narcís Sala; Attendance: 6,563; Referee: Mateo Busquets Ferrer

4 December 2024	Unionistas (3)	2–3	Rayo Vallecano (1)	Salamanca
19:00	Martin 15'; Baz 19'	Report	Trejo 36'; Díaz 54'; Embarba 84'	Stadium: Reina Sofía; Attendance: 5,914; Referee: Alejandro Muñiz Ruiz

4 December 2024	Gimnàstic (3)	0–1	Huesca (2)	Tarragona
19:00		Report	Muñoz 58'	Stadium: Nou Estadi Costa Daurada; Attendance: 5,142; Referee: Sergiu Muresan

4 December 2024	Ourense CF (3)	1–0	Deportivo La Coruña (2)	Ourense
20:00	Sánchez 87'	Report		Stadium: O Couto; Attendance: 5,100; Referee: Manuel Jesús Orellana Cid

4 December 2024	Cultural Leonesa (3)	1–2	Almería (2)	León
20:00	Alba 18'	Report	Melamed 3'; Baptistão 84'	Stadium: Reino de León; Attendance: 5,321; Referee: Andrés Fuentes Molina

4 December 2024	Cádiz (2)	0–1	Eldense (2)	Cádiz
20:00		Report	Chapela 82' (pen.)	Stadium: Nuevo Mirandilla; Attendance: 7,700; Referee: Álvaro Moreno Aragón

4 December 2024	Racing Santander (2)	1–0	Sporting Gijón (2)	Santander
20:30	Vicente 78'	Report		Stadium: El Sardinero; Attendance: 16,827; Referee: Daniel Palencia Caballero

4 December 2024	Zamora (3)	0–0 (a.e.t.) (1–3 p)	Tenerife (2)	Zamora
21:00		Report		Stadium: Ruta de la Plata; Attendance: 2,750; Referee: Miguel González Díaz
	Penalties
	Ramos (penalty missed); Roni (penalty missed); Macho (penalty scored); Kike (penalty missed)		(penalty scored) Romero; (penalty missed) Ethyan; (penalty scored) Alassan; (penalty scored) Guerrero

4 December 2024	UD Logroñés (4)	0–0 (a.e.t.) (4–3 p)	Girona (1)	Logroño
21:00		Report		Stadium: Las Gaunas; Attendance: 7,287; Referee: Ricardo De Burgos Bengoetxea
	Penalties
	Caballero (penalty scored); Madrazo (penalty missed); Agüero (penalty scored); Moreno (penalty scored); Iribarren (penalty scored)		(penalty scored) Van de Beek; (penalty missed) Ruiz; (penalty scored) Danjuma; (penalty scored) Juanpe; (penalty missed) Stuani

4 December 2024	Pontevedra (4)	1–0	Villarreal (1)	Pontevedra
21:00	Dalisson 87'	Report		Stadium: Pasarón; Attendance: 8,192; Referee: Pablo González Fuertes

4 December 2024	Estepona (4)	2–2 (a.e.t.) (4–5 p)	Leganés (1)	Estepona
21:00	Mesa 25'; Orobio 60'	Report	Munir 47'; Hernández 87'	Stadium: Francisco Muñoz Pérez; Attendance: 4,000; Referee: Francisco José Hernández Maeso
	Penalties
	H. Rodríguez (penalty scored); Dago (penalty missed); García (penalty scored); Goma (penalty scored); Caro (penalty scored)		(penalty scored) Óscar; (penalty scored) Tapia; (penalty scored) García; (penalty scored) Munir; (penalty scored) Cruz

4 December 2024	Ejea (4)	1–3	Valencia (1)	Ejea
21:00	Palmás 71'	Report	Córdoba 49'; Gómez 63'; Mir 90+1'	Stadium: Luchán; Attendance: 3,700; Referee: Miguel Ángel Ortiz Arias

5 December 2024	Cacereño (4)	1–3	Atlético Madrid (1)	Cáceres
19:00	Merencio 30'	Report	Lenglet 83'; Pérez 90+2' (o.g.); Alvarez 90+6'	Stadium: Príncipe Felipe; Attendance: 9,384; Referee: Isidro Díaz de Mera Escuderos

5 December 2024	Ceuta (3)	2–3	Osasuna (1)	Ceuta
19:00	Redruello 41'; Díez 69'	Report	Budimir 84'; García 87'; Redruello 90+3' (o.g.)	Stadium: Alfonso Murube; Attendance: 4,052; Referee: Alejandro Hernández Hernández

5 December 2024	Orihuela (4)	0–0 (a.e.t.) (0–3 p)	Getafe (1)	Orihuela
19:00		Report		Stadium: Los Arcos; Attendance: 7,000; Referee: José Luis Munuera Montero
	Penalties
	Isnaldo (penalty missed); Basterrechea (penalty missed); Goyo (penalty missed)		(penalty scored) Milla; (penalty scored) Santiago; (penalty scored) Iglesias

5 December 2024	Barakaldo (3)	1–2	Racing Ferrol (2)	Barakaldo
20:00	Bilbao 19'	Report	Bebé 26'; Nacho 86'	Stadium: Lasesarre; Attendance: 4,200; Referee: Eder Mallo Fernández

5 December 2024	Andorra (3)	0–1	Cartagena (2)	Andorra la Vella
20:00		Report	Ortuño 29'	Stadium: Estadi Nacional d'Andorra; Attendance: 931; Referee: Carlos Muñiz Muñoz

5 December 2024	Marbella (3)	1–0	Burgos (2)	Marbella
20:00	Álvarez 90+3'	Report		Stadium: Dama de Noche; Attendance: 900; Referee: Manuel Ángel Pérez Hernández

5 December 2024	Ponferradina (3)	1–1 (a.e.t.) (4–3 p)	Castellón (2)	Ponferrada
20:00	Costa 90+1'	Report	Bosilj 45+1'	Stadium: El Toralín; Attendance: 4,490; Referee: Jon Ander González Esteban
	Penalties
	Esquerdo (penalty scored); Bustos (penalty missed); López (penalty missed); Costa (penalty scored); Abelenda (penalty scored); Cortés (penalty scored)		(penalty scored) Suero; (penalty missed) Sánchez; (penalty scored) Jiménez; (penalty scored) Moyita; (penalty missed) Van den Belt; (penalty missed) Seuntjens

5 December 2024	Olot (4)	1–3	Sevilla (1)	Olot
21:00	Ayala 90+1'	Report	Montiel 22' (pen.); Juanlu 48'; Iheanacho 73'	Stadium: Municipal; Attendance: 2,321; Referee: Guillermo Cuadra Fernández

5 December 2024	Conquense (4)	0–1 (a.e.t.)	Real Sociedad (1)	Cuenca
21:00		Report	Méndez 92'	Stadium: La Fuensanta; Attendance: 6,000; Referee: Víctor García Verdura

5 December 2024	Minera (4)	2–2 (a.e.t.) (4–2 p)	Alavés (1)	Cartagena (Note: Minera did not play the match in their main stadium Municipal Ángel Celdrán, Llano del Beal, as it did not meet the broadcasting requirements.)
21:00	Mas 33'; Baradji 105+2'	Report	Kike 60', 108' (pen.)	Stadium: Cartagonova; Attendance: 7,000; Referee: Juan Martínez Munuera
	Penalties
	Britos (penalty scored); Sanchís (penalty scored); Vera (penalty scored); Mas (penalty scored)		(penalty scored) Jordán; (penalty missed) Abde; (penalty missed) Protesoni; (penalty scored) Conechny

== Round of 32 ==
=== Draw ===
The draw for the round of 32 was held on 9 December 2024 in the RFEF headquarters in Las Rozas. The four participant teams of the 2025 Supercopa de España were drawn with the teams from the lowest category. The remaining teams from the lowest categories faced the rest of La Liga teams. Matches were played at stadiums of lower-ranked teams.

A total of 16 matches were played between 3 and 7 January 2025.

Pot 1; 4 participants in 2025 Supercopa de España	Pot 2; 12 teams of La Liga	Pot 3; 9 teams of Segunda División	Pot 4; 3 teams of Primera Federación	Pot 5; 4 teams of Segunda Federación
Athletic Bilbao; Barcelona; Mallorca; Real Madrid	Atlético Madrid; Celta Vigo; Getafe; Las Palmas; Leganés; Osasuna; Rayo Vallecano; Real Betis; Real Sociedad; Sevilla; Valencia; Valladolid	Almería; Cartagena; Elche; Eldense; Granada; Huesca; Racing Ferrol; Racing Santander; Tenerife	Marbella; Ourense CF; Ponferradina	Barbastro; UD Logroñés; Minera; Pontevedra

=== Matches ===
3 January 2025	Racing Ferrol (2)	1–3	Rayo Vallecano (1)	Ferrol
19:00	Giménez 90+1'	Report	Espino 8'; De Frutos 32', 59'	Stadium: A Malata; Attendance: 6,521; Referee: Adrián Cordero Vega

3 January 2025	Granada (2)	0–1 (a.e.t.)	Getafe (1)	Granada
19:00		Report	Mayoral 93'	Stadium: Estadio Nuevo Los Cármenes; Attendance: 16,616; Referee: José María Sánchez Martínez

3 January 2025	Pontevedra (4)	3–0	Mallorca (1)	Pontevedra
19:00	Dalisson 21'; Pino 49'; Sánchez 72'	Report		Stadium: Pasarón; Attendance: 10,292; Referee: Alejandro Hernández Hernández

4 January 2025	Huesca (2)	0–1	Real Betis (1)	Huesca
15:30		Report	Isco 38'	Stadium: El Alcoraz; Attendance: 7,968; Referee: Miguel Ángel Ortiz Arias

4 January 2025	Tenerife (2)	1–2	Osasuna (1)	Santa Cruz de Tenerife
15:30 WET	José León 45'	Report	Herrando 7'; José León 25' (o.g.)	Stadium: Heliodoro Rodríguez López; Attendance: 16,602; Referee: Juan Martínez Munuera

4 January 2025	Almería (2)	4–1	Sevilla (1)	Almería
17:30	Milovanović 49'; Suárez 54', 78', 90+6' (pen.)	Report	Romero 5'	Stadium: UD Almería Stadium; Attendance: 15,067; Referee: Mateo Busquets Ferrer

4 January 2025	Barbastro (4)	0–4	Barcelona (1)	Barbastro
19:00		Report	García 21'; Lewandowski 31', 47'; Torre 56'	Stadium: Municipal de Deportes; Attendance: 5,500; Referee: Isidro Díaz de Mera Escuderos

4 January 2025	Marbella (3)	0–1	Atlético Madrid (1)	Málaga (Note: Marbella did not play the match in their main stadium Dama de Noche, Marbella, as it did not meet the broadcasting requirements.)
21:30		Report	Griezmann 16'	Stadium: La Rosaleda; Attendance: 30,044; Referee: Alejandro Muñiz Ruiz

4 January 2025	UD Logroñés (4)	0–0 (a.e.t.) (3–4 p)	Athletic Bilbao (1)	Logroño
21:30		Report		Stadium: Las Gaunas; Attendance: 15,577; Referee: Mario Melero López
	Penalties
	Monreal (penalty scored); Gualda (penalty missed); Sarriegi (penalty missed); Agüero (penalty scored); Moreno (penalty scored)		(penalty scored) Vivian; (penalty scored) Berchiche; (penalty missed) N. Williams; (penalty scored) Berenguer; (penalty scored) Gómez

5 January 2025	Ourense CF (3)	3–2	Valladolid (1)	Ourense
12:00	Noriega 17'; Ramos 32'; Sánchez 52'	Report	Moro 15'; Amallah 24'	Stadium: O Couto; Attendance: 2,500; Referee: Francisco José Hernández Maeso

5 January 2025	Elche (2)	4–0	Las Palmas (1)	Elche
12:00	Mendoza 44'; Affengruber 56'; Salinas 61'; Fernández 71'	Report		Stadium: Martínez Valero; Attendance: 18,302; Referee: José Luis Munuera Montero

5 January 2025	Cartagena (2)	1–2	Leganés (1)	Cartagena
15:30	Muñoz 17'	Report	Munir 28'; Raba 51'	Stadium: Cartagonova; Attendance: 4,485; Referee: Víctor García Verdura

5 January 2025	Ponferradina (3)	0–2	Real Sociedad (1)	Ponferrada
15:30		Report	Oyarzabal 54'; Méndez 69'	Stadium: El Toralín; Attendance: 8,064; Referee: Jesús Gil Manzano

5 January 2025	Racing Santander (2)	2–3	Celta Vigo (1)	Santander
15:30	Martín 8'; Rodríguez 70' (o.g.)	Report	Alfon 20', 90+2'; Castro 86' (o.g.)	Stadium: El Sardinero; Attendance: 20,312; Referee: Pablo González Fuertes

6 January 2025	Minera (4)	0–5	Real Madrid (1)	Cartagena (Note: Minera did not play the match in their main stadium Municipal Ángel Celdrán, Llano del Beal, as it did not meet the broadcasting requirements.)
19:00		Report	Valverde 5'; Camavinga 13'; Güler 28', 88'; Modrić 55'	Stadium: Cartagonova; Attendance: 13,392; Referee: Javier Alberola Rojas

7 January 2025	Eldense (2)	0–2	Valencia (1)	Elda
21:00		Report	Canós 9'; López 39'	Stadium: Nuevo Pepico Amat; Attendance: 5,032; Referee: Guillermo Cuadra Fernández

== Round of 16 ==
=== Draw ===
The draw for the round of 16 was held on 8 January 2025 in the RFEF headquarters in Las Rozas. The qualified teams were split up into four groups based on their division in the 2024–25 season. When possible, matches were played at the stadiums of the lower-ranked teams, otherwise the first team drawn played at home.

A total of eight matches were played between 14 and 16 January 2025.

Pot 1; 12 teams of La Liga	Pot 2; 2 teams of Segunda División	Pot 3; 1 team of Primera Federación	Pot 4; 1 team of Segunda Federación
Athletic Bilbao; Atlético Madrid; Barcelona; Celta Vigo; Getafe; Leganés; Osasuna; Rayo Vallecano; Real Betis; Real Madrid; Real Sociedad; Valencia	Almería; Elche	Ourense CF	Pontevedra

=== Matches ===
14 January 2025	Ourense CF (3)	0–2	Valencia (1)	Ourense
21:00		Report	Carmona 50' (o.g.); Sadiq 78'	Stadium: O Couto; Attendance: 5,999; Referee: Miguel Ángel Ortiz Arias

15 January 2025	Almería (2)	2–3	Leganés (1)	Almería
19:30	Suárez 38'; Lázaro 52'	Report	Altimira 33'; De la Fuente 76' (pen.); García 86'	Stadium: UD Almería Stadium; Attendance: 12,843; Referee: Ricardo de Burgos Bengoetxea

15 January 2025	Pontevedra (4)	0–1	Getafe (1)	Pontevedra
19:30		Report	Rodríguez 2'	Stadium: Pasarón; Attendance: 10,497; Referee: Alejandro Quintero González

15 January 2025	Barcelona (1)	5–1	Real Betis (1)	Barcelona
21:00	Gavi 3'; Koundé 27'; Raphinha 58'; Torres 67'; Yamal 75'	Report	Vitor Roque 84' (pen.)	Stadium: Estadi Olímpic Lluís Companys; Attendance: 46,019; Referee: José María Sánchez Martínez

15 January 2025	Elche (2)	0–4	Atlético Madrid (1)	Elche
21:30		Report	Sørloth 8', 29' (pen.); Riquelme 61'; Alvarez 75'	Stadium: Martínez Valero; Attendance: 26,405; Referee: Guillermo Cuadra Fernández

16 January 2025	Real Sociedad (1)	3–1	Rayo Vallecano (1)	San Sebastián
19:30	Oyarzabal 23'; Olasagasti 45+1'; Gómez 79'	Report	Trejo 45+7' (pen.)	Stadium: Anoeta; Attendance: 27,816; Referee: Francisco José Hernández Maeso

16 January 2025	Athletic Bilbao (1)	2–3	Osasuna (1)	Bilbao
19:30	N. Williams 45+3'; De Marcos 55'	Report	Oroz 40'; Budimir 44' (pen.), 70'	Stadium: San Mamés; Attendance: 48,230; Referee: Mateo Busquets Ferrer

16 January 2025	Real Madrid (1)	5–2 (a.e.t.)	Celta Vigo (1)	Madrid
21:30	Mbappé 37'; Vinícius 48'; Endrick 108', 119'; Valverde 112'	Report	Bamba 83'; Alonso 90+1' (pen.)	Stadium: Santiago Bernabéu; Attendance: 64,764; Referee: José Luis Munuera Montero

== Quarter-finals ==
=== Draw ===
The draw for the quarter-finals was held on 20 January 2025 in the RFEF headquarters in Las Rozas. As there were no remaining teams from the lower divisions, home teams were determined by luck of the draw.

A total of four matches were played between 4 and 6 February 2025.

Pot 1
8 teams of La Liga
- Atlético Madrid
- Barcelona
- Getafe
- Leganés
- Osasuna
- Real Madrid
- Real Sociedad
- Valencia

=== Matches ===
4 February 2025	Atlético Madrid (1)	5–0	Getafe (1)	Madrid
21:30	Simeone 8', 17'; Lino 42'; Correa 78'; Sørloth 86'	Report		Stadium: Metropolitano; Attendance: 60,000; Referee: Guillermo Cuadra Fernández

5 February 2025	Leganés (1)	2–3	Real Madrid (1)	Leganés
21:00	Cruz 39' (pen.), 59'	Report	Modrić 18'; Endrick 25'; G. García 90+3'	Stadium: Butarque; Attendance: 11,709; Referee: Javier Alberola Rojas

6 February 2025	Real Sociedad (1)	2–0	Osasuna (1)	San Sebastián
19:30	Barrenetxea 21'; Méndez 31'	Report		Stadium: Reale Arena; Attendance: 34,658; Referee: Mario Melero López

6 February 2025	Valencia (1)	0–5	Barcelona (1)	Valencia
21:30		Report	Torres 3', 17', 30'; López 23'; Yamal 59'	Stadium: Mestalla; Attendance: 46,806; Referee: Miguel Ángel Ortiz Arias

== Semi-finals ==
=== Draw ===
The draw for the semi-finals was held on 12 February 2025, in the RFEF headquarters in Las Rozas.

First leg matches were played on 25 and 26 February, and second leg matches were played on 1 and 2 April 2025.

Qualified teams
4 teams of La Liga
- Atlético Madrid
- Barcelona
- Real Madrid
- Real Sociedad

=== Summary ===
Team 1	Agg.	Team 2	1st leg	2nd leg
Barcelona (1)	5–4	Atlético Madrid (1)	4–4	1–0
Real Sociedad (1)	4–5	Real Madrid (1)	0–1	4–4 (a.e.t.)

=== Matches ===
25 February 2025
21:30

Barcelona	4–4	Atlético Madrid
Pedri 19'; Cubarsí 21'; Martínez 41'; Lewandowski 74'	Report	Alvarez 1'; Griezmann 6'; Llorente 84'; Sørloth 90+3'

Estadi Olímpic Lluís Companys, Barcelona
Attendance: 40,915
Referee: Alejandro Hernández Hernández
2 April 2025
21:30

Atlético Madrid	0–1	Barcelona
	Report	Torres 27'

Metropolitano, Madrid
Attendance: 69,014
Referee: José Luis Munuera Montero

Barcelona won 5–4 on aggregate.

26 February 2025
21:30

Real Sociedad	0–1	Real Madrid
	Report	Endrick 19'

Reale Arena, San Sebastián
Attendance: 37,373
Referee: José María Sánchez Martínez
1 April 2025
21:30

Real Madrid	4–4 (a.e.t.)	Real Sociedad
Endrick 30'; Bellingham 82'; Tchouaméni 86'; Rüdiger 115'	Report	Barrenetxea 16'; Alaba 72' (o.g.); Oyarzabal 80', 90+3'

Santiago Bernabéu, Madrid
Attendance: 81,044
Referee: Javier Alberola Rojas

Real Madrid won 5–4 on aggregate.

== Final ==
26 April 2025
22:00 CEST

Barcelona	3–2 (a.e.t.)	Real Madrid
Pedri 28'; Torres 84'; Koundé 116'	Report	Mbappé 70'; Tchouaméni 77'

La Cartuja, Seville
Attendance: 55,579
Referee: Ricardo de Burgos Bengoetxea

== Top scorers ==
Rank	Player	Club	Goals
1	(Spain) Ferran Torres	Barcelona	6
2	(Argentina) Julián Alvarez	Atlético Madrid	5
2	(Brazil) Endrick	Real Madrid	5
4	(Spain) Ander Barrenetxea	Real Sociedad	4
4	(Spain) Sito Barrera	Barbastro	4
4	(Spain) Jaime Mata	Las Palmas	4
4	(Spain) Mikel Oyarzabal	Real Sociedad	4
4	(Norway) Alexander Sørloth	Atlético Madrid	4
4	(Colombia) Luis Suárez	Almería	4
10	Sixteen players		3
