= Nana Asare =

Nana Asare is the name of:

- Nana Akwasi Asare (born 1986), Ghanaian footballer
- Isaac Nana Asare (born 1994), Ghanaian footballer
