= Fútbol Playa Badajoz CD =

Association football club

Fútbol Playa Badajoz
- Full name: Fútbol Playa Badajoz Club Deportivo
- Founded: 2023
- Dissolved: 2024
- Ground: Eusebio Bejarano, Badajoz, Extremadura, Spain
- President: Elisabet García
- Manager: John Angarita
- 2023–24: Segunda Extremeña – Group 2, 2nd of 13 (promoted via play-offs)
Home colours	Away colours

Fútbol Playa Badajoz Club Deportivo was a Spanish football club based in Badajoz, in the autonomous community of Extremadura. Founded in 2023 and dissolved in 2024, the club held home games at Campos Federativos Eusebio Bejarano.

== History ==
In July 2023, Fútbol Playa Badajoz was founded with an agreement with FC La Guajira, a Colombian club founded in the previous year, aiming to start a sporting project in the city of Badajoz to embrace the Colombian emigrants to the city. In their first senior season, they achieved promotion from the Segunda División Extremeña, and also qualified to the preliminary round of the 2024–25 Copa del Rey after winning the Copa Extremadura.

In July 2024, however, Fútbol Playa Badajoz did not register in any competition for the 2024–25 season, losing their Copa del Rey spot to CD Gévora.

== Season to season ==
Season	Tier	Division	Place	Copa del Rey
2023–24	7	2ª Ext.	2nd	
