= Etienne Eto'o (footballer, born 2002) =

Footballer (born 2002)

Personal information
- Full name: Etienne Eto'o Pineda
- Date of birth: 18 August 2002 (age 24)
- Place of birth: Palma, Spain
- Height: 1.89 m (6 ft 2 in)
- Position: Forward

Team information
- Current team: Racing Ferrol (on loan from Rayo Vallecano)

Youth career
- –2019: Mallorca
- 2019–2020: Atlético Baleares
- 2020–2021: Oviedo
- 2021–2022: Vitória Guimarães

Senior career*
| Years | Team | Apps | (Gls) |
| 2022–2023 | Poblense | 21 | (4) |
| 2023–2024 | Collado Villalba | 30 | (15) |
| 2024 | Rayo Majadahonda | 1 | (0) |
| 2024–2025 | Rayo Vallecano B | 33 | (26) |
| 2024– | Rayo Vallecano | 2 | (0) |
| 2025–2026 | → Mirandés (loan) | 6 | (0) |
| 2026 | → Villarreal B (loan) | 17 | (2) |
| 2026– | → Racing Ferrol (loan) | 0 | (0) |

International career^{‡}
| 2021 | Cameroon U20 | 2 | (2) |
| 2023–2025 | Cameroon U23 | 3 | (1) |
- * Club domestic league appearances and goals as of 10 June 2026 ‡ National team caps and goals as of 19:06, 22 February 2021 (UTC)

Etienne Eto'o Pineda (born 18 August 2002) is a footballer who plays as a forward for Spanish club Racing de Ferrol, on loan from Rayo Vallecano. Born in Spain, he represents Cameroon at youth international level.

== Early and personal life ==
Eto'o was born in Palma in 2002, the son of the Cameroonian footballer Samuel Eto'o and a Spanish mother.

== Club career ==
In December 2019, Eto'o moved from Mallorca to Atlético Baleares. In 2020, he joined Real Oviedo. In September 2021, he moved to Portuguese club Vitória de Guimarães.

In July 2022, Eto'o returned to Spain with Poblense in Tercera Federación. In August 2023, he signed for Rayo Majadahonda and was assigned to farm team Collado Villalba.

In July 2024, Eto'o signed for Rayo Vallecano; assigned to the B-team, he made the pre-season with the main squad. Later that year, on 29 October, he scored on his debut for the first-team, in a 5–0 away win over CD Villamuriel in the Copa del Rey.

On 1 September 2025, Eto'o was loaned to Segunda División side CD Mirandés, for one year. His loan was cut short on 15 January 2026, and he moved to Villarreal CF B also in a temporary deal the following day.

On 1 September 2026, Eto'o moved to fellow Primera Federación side Racing de Ferrol, also on loan.

== International career ==
Born in Spain, Eto'o elected to represent Cameroon at international level.

In September 2019, he was called up to the Cameroon under-17 team for the 2019 FIFA U-17 World Cup. However, in October 2019 he was dropped from the national team due to a Presidential decree which stated all under-15 and under-17 youth players must be based in the country. In December 2019, he was prevented from playing for the under-20 team for similar reasons. In February 2021, he scored on his first start for the Cameroon under-20 team.

On 28 March 2023, he netted the only goal in a 1–0 victory for the Cameroon under-23 team against Gabon U23 during the 2023 Africa Cup of Nations qualification, with the tie ending in a penalty shoot-out defeat.
