= Samu Fernández =

Spanish footballer

Personal information
- Full name: Samuel Fernández Leonardo
- Date of birth: 17 March 2007 (age 19)
- Place of birth: Narón, Spain
- Height: 1.82 m (6 ft 0 in)
- Position: Centre-back

Team information
- Current team: Deportivo B
- Number: 4

Youth career
- Narón
- Galicia de Caranza
- Parrulo (futsal)
- Racing Ferrol
- 2018–2019: Deportivo La Coruña
- 2019–2020: San Tirso
- 2020–2021: Deportivo La Coruña
- 2021–2022: San Tirso
- 2022–2025: Deportivo La Coruña

Senior career*
Years	Team	Apps	(Gls)
2024–	Deportivo B	31	(0)
2025–	Deportivo A Coruña	1	(0)

International career
2025–	Spain U19	3	(0)
- * Club domestic league appearances and goals as of 31 May 2026

Samuel "Samu" Fernández Leonardo (born 17 March 2007) is a Spanish professional footballer who plays as a centre-back for Deportivo Fabril.

== Club career ==
Born in Narón, A Coruña, Galicia, Fernández began his career with hometown side Narón BP, and later represented SCDR Galicia de Caranza, O Parrulo FS (in futsal) and Racing de Ferrol before joining Deportivo de La Coruña's youth sides in 2018. He made his senior debut with the latter's reserve team at the age of 17 on 3 November 2024, coming on as a first-half substitute in a 1–0 Segunda Federación home win over CD Guijuelo.

Fernández made his first team debut on 4 December 2025, starting in a 2–0 away win over CE Sabadell FC, for the season's Copa del Rey. He made his professional debut the following 31 May, replacing Arnau Comas late into a 2–1 Segunda División home loss to UD Las Palmas, as his side was already promoted.

== International career ==
In December 2025, Fernández was called up to the Spain national under-19 team.
