= Kevin Sánchez =

Spanish footballer (born 2005)

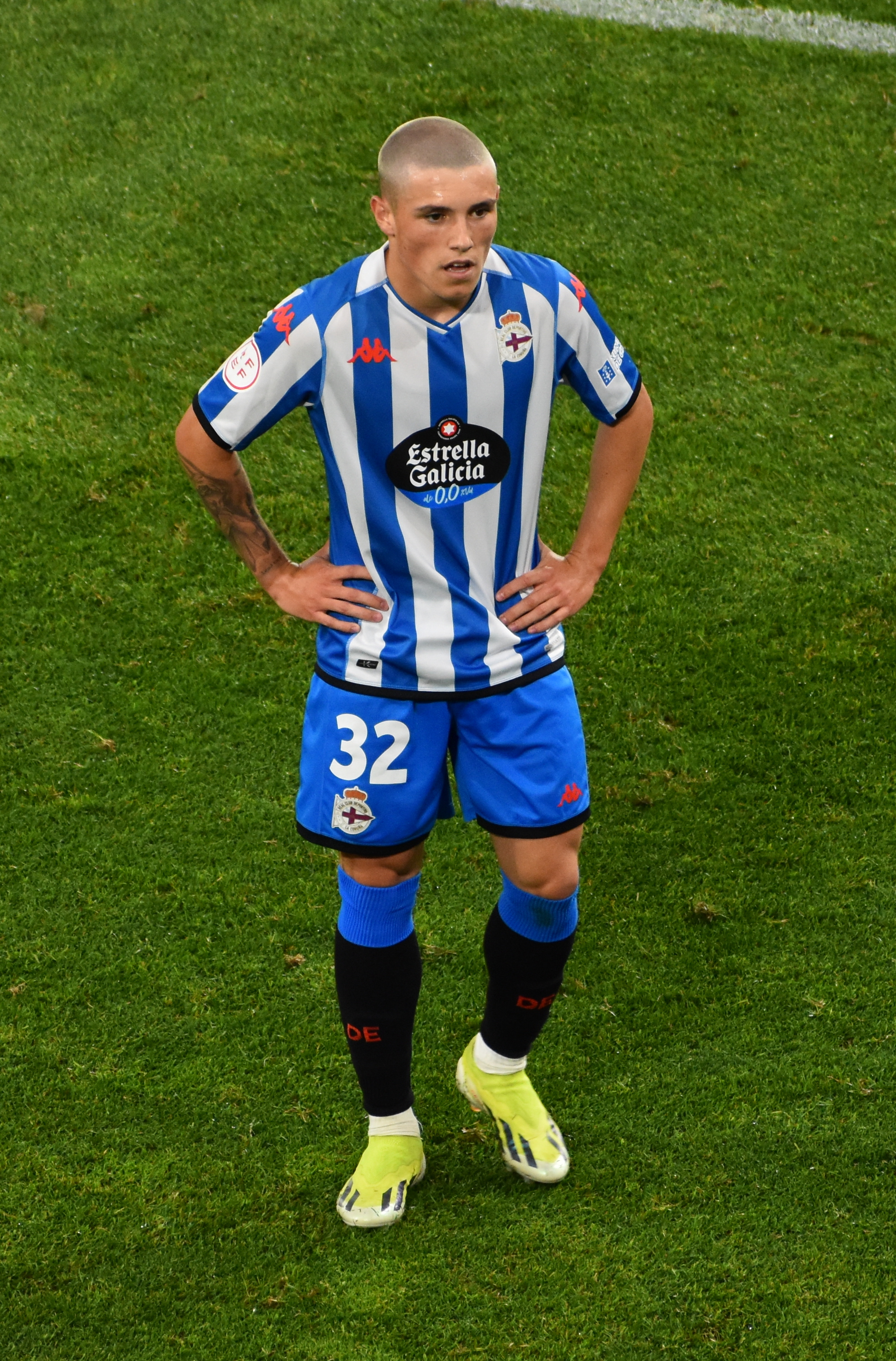
- Sánchez playing for Deportivo La Coruña in 2024

Personal information
- Full name: Kevin Sánchez Rey
- Date of birth: 20 February 2005 (age 21)
- Place of birth: Burgos, Spain
- Height: 1.69 m (5 ft 7 in)
- Position: Forward

Team information
- Current team: Deportivo B
- Number: 10

Youth career
- 2013–2014: Inter Vista Alegre
- 2014–2019: Burgos
- 2019–2023: Deportivo La Coruña
- 2019–2020: → San Tirso (loan)

Senior career*
Years	Team	Apps	(Gls)
2022–	Deportivo B	53	(18)
2023–	Deportivo A Coruña	6	(0)
2025–2026	→ Cartagena (loan)	36	(2)

International career
2022–2023	Spain U18	5	(1)
2023–	Spain U19	7	(1)
- * Club domestic league appearances and goals as of 17 August 2026

Kevin Sánchez Rey (born 20 February 2005), sometimes known as just Kevin, is a Spanish footballer who plays for Deportivo Fabril. Mainly a forward, he can also play as a winger.

== Club career ==
Born in Burgos, Castile and León, Sánchez joined Deportivo de La Coruña's youth setup in 2019, after representing Burgos CF and CD Internacional Vista Alegre; he was initially assigned to affiliate club San Tirso SD. He made his senior debut with the reserves on 20 November 2022, coming on as a second-half substitute in a 3–2 Tercera Federación home win over Silva SD.

On 16 June 2023, Sánchez renewed his contract with Dépor until 2028, and was definitely promoted to the B-team. He made his first team debut on 6 December, replacing Berto Cayarga and scoring an equalizer in a 3–2 home loss to CD Tenerife, for the season's Copa del Rey.

Sánchez made his professional debut on 17 November 2024, replacing Hugo Rama in a 2–1 Segunda División away loss to UD Almería. The following 30 July, he moved to Primera Federación side FC Cartagena on a one-year loan deal.

Upon returning, Sánchez spent the pre-season with the main squad of Deportivo, and made his La Liga debut on 17 August 2026, replacing Pierre-Emerick Aubameyang late into a 1–1 home draw against Elche CF.

== International career ==
Sánchez represented Spain at under-18 and under-19 levels.
