= Adrián Guerrero (footballer, born 2006) =

Spanish footballer (born 2006)

Personal information
- Full name: Adrián Guerrero Mouriz
- Date of birth: 15 February 2006 (age 20)
- Place of birth: Ferrol, Spain
- Height: 1.86 m (6 ft 1 in)
- Position: Winger

Team information
- Current team: Deportivo B

Youth career
- Racing Ferrol
- 2014–2018: Deportivo La Coruña
- 2018–2019: San Tirso
- 2019–2020: Deportivo La Coruña
- 2020–2021: San Tirso
- 2021–2024: Deportivo La Coruña

Senior career*
Years	Team	Apps	(Gls)
2024–	Deportivo B	34	(7)
2025–	Deportivo A Coruña	2	(0)
2025–2026	→ Ourense (loan)	37	(3)
- * Club domestic league appearances and goals as of 10 June 2026

Adrián Guerrero Mouriz (born 15 February 2006) is a Spanish footballer who plays for Deportivo Fabril. Mainly a right winger, he can also play as a forward.

== Career ==
Born in Ferrol, A Coruña, Galicia, Guerrero joined Deportivo de La Coruña's youth sides in 2014, aged eight, after playing for hometown side Racing de Ferrol. He made his senior debut with the reserves on 14 April 2024, coming on as a second-half substitute in a 2–2 Segunda Federación home draw against CD Guijuelo.

On 8 July 2024, after finishing his formation, Guerrero renewed his contract until 2028 and was definitely promoted to the B-team. He scored his first senior goal on 20 October, netting the B's second in a 4–0 home routing of UM Escobedo, and subsequently became a regular starter for the side.

Guerrero made his first team debut on 25 May 2025, starting in a 1–0 Segunda División away loss to Real Zaragoza.
