= Ontiñena CF =

Association football club in Spain

Ontiñena
- Full name: Ontiñena Club de Fútbol
- Founded: 1948
- Ground: El Balsal; Ontiñena, Aragon, Spain
- Capacity: 1,000
- President: Hugo Lax
- Head coach: Sergio Valero
- League: Regional Preferente – Group 1
- 2025–26: Regional Preferente – Group 1, 3rd of 18
Home colours	Away colours

Ontiñena Club de Fútbol is a Spanish football team based in Ontiñena, in the Autonomous Region of Aragon. Founded in 1948, the club plays in the Regional Preferente – Group 1, and holds home games at Campo Municipal de Fútbol El Balsal, with a capacity of 1,000 people.

== History ==
=== Club background ===
- Club de Fútbol Ontiñena (1948–2012)
- Carbe Ontiñena (2012–2016)
- Ontiñena Club de Fútbol (2016–)

== Season to season ==
Season	Tier	Division	Place	Copa del Rey
1975–76	7	2ª Reg.	6th	
1976–77	7	2ª Reg.	4th	
1977–78	7	2ª Reg.	2nd	
1978–79	7	2ª Reg.	2nd	
1979–80	7	2ª Reg.	12th	
1980–81	7	2ª Reg.	14th	
1981–82	7	2ª Reg.	8th	
1982–83	7	2ª Reg.	6th	
1983–84	7	2ª Reg.	4th	
1984–85	7	2ª Reg.	1st	
1985–86	6	1ª Reg.	7th	
1986–87	6	1ª Reg.	8th	
1987–88	6	1ª Reg.	8th	
1988–89	6	1ª Reg.	10th	
1989–90	6	1ª Reg.	12th	
1990–91	6	1ª Reg.	8th	
1991–92	6	1ª Reg.	8th	
1992–93	6	1ª Reg.	15th	
1993–94	6	1ª Reg.	12th	
1994–95	6	1ª Reg.	6th	

Season	Tier	Division	Place	Copa del Rey
1995–96	6	1ª Reg.	3rd	
1996–97	6	1ª Reg.	10th	
1997–98	6	1ª Reg.	14th	
1998–99	6	1ª Reg.	3rd	
1999–2000	5	Reg. Pref.	10th	
2000–01	6	1ª Reg.	18th	
2001–02	DNP			
2002–03	7	2ª Reg.	10th	
2003–04	7	2ª Reg.	11th	
2004–05	7	2ª Reg.	14th	
2005–06	7	2ª Reg.	11th	
2006–07	7	2ª Reg.	(R)	
2007–08	7	2ª Reg.	9th	
2008–09	7	2ª Reg.	4th	
2009–10	7	2ª Reg.	1st	
2010–11	6	1ª Reg.	16th	
2011–12	7	2ª Reg.	1st	
2012–13	7	2ª Reg.	1st	
2013–14	7	2ª Reg.	3rd	
2014–15	7	2ª Reg.	6th	

Season	Tier	Division	Place	Copa del Rey
2015–16	7	2ª Reg.	3rd	
2016–17	7	2ª Reg.	4th	
2017–18	7	2ª Reg.	4th	
2018–19	6	1ª Reg.	17th	
2019–20	7	2ª Reg.	3rd	
2020–21	6	1ª Reg.	4th	
2021–22	7	1ª Reg.	1st	
2022–23	6	Reg. Pref.	9th	
2023–24	6	Reg. Pref.	3rd	
2024–25	6	Reg. Pref.	4th	First round
2025–26	6	Reg. Pref.	3th	
