= Tim Caroutas =

Australian soccer player (born 2003)

Personal information
- Full name: Thymos Nikitas Caroutas McDiarmid
- Date of birth: 2 January 2003 (age 23)
- Place of birth: Illawarra, Australia
- Height: 1.83 m (6 ft 0 in)
- Position: Winger

Team information
- Current team: RCD Espanyol B
- Number: 17

Youth career
- –2022: UE Cornellà

Senior career*
Years	Team	Apps	(Gls)
2020–2022	UE Cornellà	0	(0)
2022–2024	Deportivo Fabril	27	(1)
2024–	RCD Espanyol B	20	(2)
- * Club domestic league appearances and goals as of 13 May 2025

Thymos Nikitas Caroutas McDiarmid (Greek: Τίμος Καρούτας; born 1 January 2003) is an Australian professional soccer player who plays as a winger for RCD Espanyol B.

== Early life ==
Caroutas was born on 1 January 2003 in Illawarra, Australia and is a native of Wollongong, Australia. Of Greek descent through his parents, he is named after his uncle Thymos.

== Career ==
As a youth player, Caroutas joined the youth academy of Spanish side UE Cornellà and was promoted to the club's senior team in 2022, where he made zero league appearances and scored zero goals.

During the summer of 2022, he signed for Spanish side Deportivo Fabril, where he made twenty-seven league appearances and scored one goal. Spanish newspaper wrote in 2023 that he "was unlucky enough to be injured on the first matchday of the league [during the 2022–23 season]. A year later, and fully recovered, Thymos Caroutas alternates between starting and substitute appearances in the Second Division" while playing for the club. Ahead of the 2024–25 season, he signed for Spanish side RCD Espanyol B.
