= Pape Cheikh Diop =

Spanish footballer

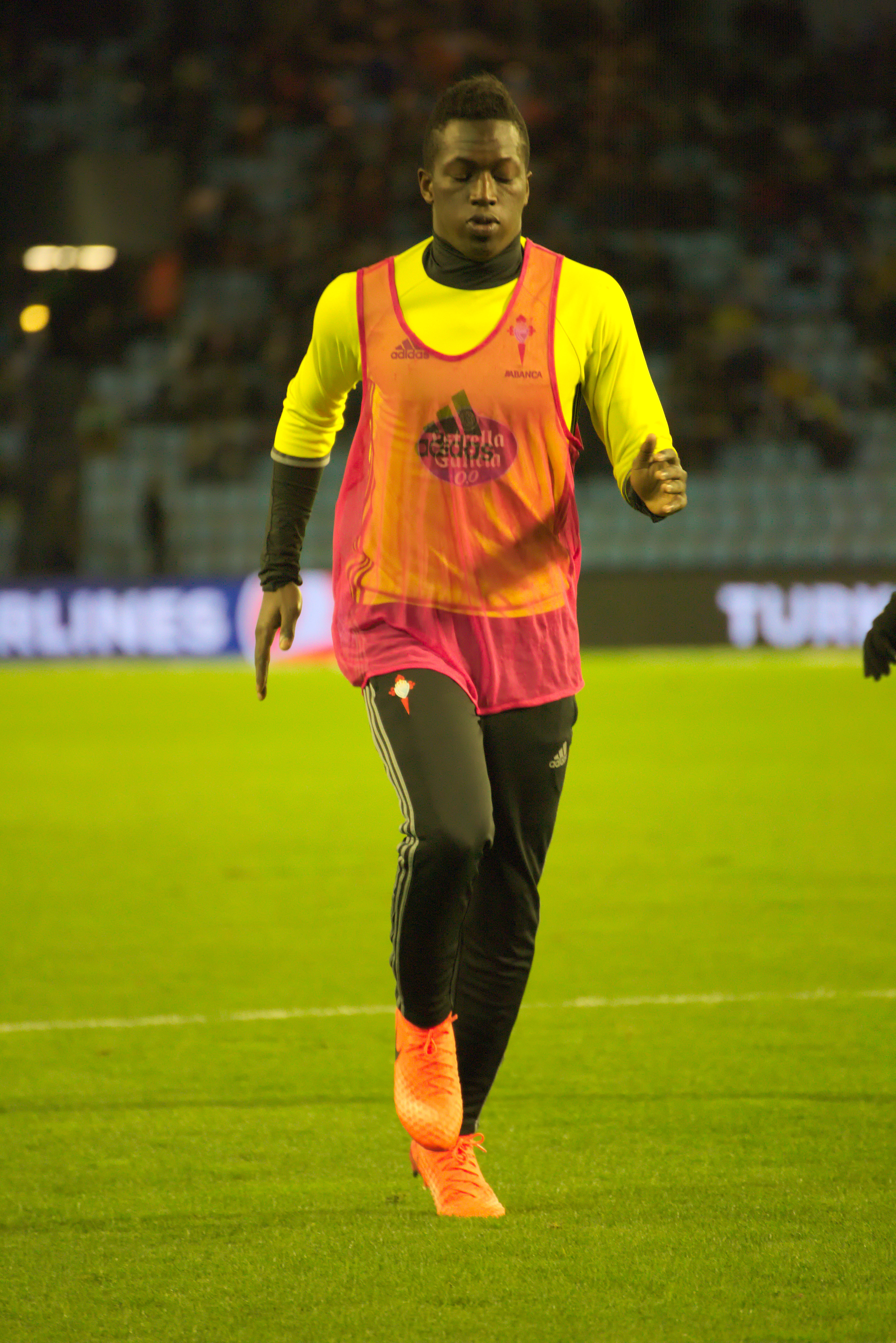
- Diop with Celta in 2017

Personal information
- Full name: Pape Cheikh Diop Gueye
- Date of birth: 8 August 1997 (age 29)
- Place of birth: Guédiawaye, Dakar, Senegal
- Height: 1.80 m (5 ft 11 in)
- Position: Midfielder

Team information
- Current team: Promesas EDF

Youth career
- 2011–2012: CIA
- 2012–2013: Montañeros
- 2013–2015: Celta

Senior career*
Years	Team	Apps	(Gls)
2014–2016	Celta B	21	(2)
2015–2017	Celta	22	(1)
2017–2022	Lyon B	13	(2)
2017–2022	Lyon	13	(0)
2019–2020	→ Celta (loan)	16	(0)
2020–2021	→ Dijon (loan)	21	(0)
2022	Aris	10	(0)
2023	Elche	2	(0)
2024	DAC Dunajská Streda	1	(0)
2024–2025	Al Arabi		
2026–	Promesas EDF	0	(0)

International career^{‡}
2015	Spain U18	2	(0)
2015–2016	Spain U19	10	(0)
2018	Spain U21	3	(0)
2020	Senegal	3	(0)
- * Club domestic league appearances and goals as of 18 May 2024 ‡ National team caps and goals as of 9 October 2020

Pape Cheikh Diop Gueye (born 8 August 1997) is a Senegalese professional footballer who plays as a midfielder for Promesas EDF. A youth international for Spain, he plays for the Senegal national team.

== Club career ==
=== Youth ===
Diop moved to Spain at age 14 in 2011 to join Club Internacional de la Amistad, an academy for foreign players in Palencia. After a spell at Montañeros CF in A Coruña, he joined Celta de Vigo's youth setup in 2013.

=== Celta ===
Diop made his senior debut with the reserves on 23 August 2014, coming on as a second-half substitute in a 2–0 Segunda División B away win against CD Lealtad. He scored his first goal eight days later, netting the last in a 5–0 home routing of UP Langreo.

On 11 August 2015, Diop signed a new five-year deal with the club, running until 2020. He made his first team – and La Liga – debut on 12 December of that year, replacing Nolito in the dying minutes of a 1–0 home success over RCD Espanyol.

Diop scored his first goal in the main category on 27 November 2016, netting the last in a 3–1 home win against Granada CF. The following 31 January, he extended his contract until 2021 and was definitely promoted to the main squad, being assigned the number 4 jersey.

=== Lyon ===
On 29 August 2017, Lyon announced the signing of Diop on a five-year deal. The transfer fee paid to Celta was reported as €10 million with €4 million of possible bonuses. On 14 August 2019, after featuring sparingly, he returned to his former side Celta on loan for the 2019–20 campaign.

==== Loan to Dijon ====
On 6 August 2020, Diop signed for Ligue 1 club Dijon on loan for one season. The deal included an option to buy of €5 million plus an additional €1.5 million in bonuses, and a 15% sell-on fee clause. Diop made his debut for Dijon in a 1–0 loss to Angers on 22 August 2020.

=== Later career ===
On 29 June 2022, Diop signed a two-year contract with Super League Greece club Aris.

Free agent Diop joined La Liga side Elche on 14 February 2023 after a trial. He was signed to a contract on until the end of the season.

On 6 March 2024, Diop joined Slovak First Football League club DAC Dunajská Streda on a contract until the end of the season with an option to extend.

On 31 March 2026, Diop joined Regional Preferente club Promesas EDF.

== International career ==
Born in Senegal and raised in Spain from age 14, Diop was a youth international for Spain. In September 2018, Diop declared his international allegiance to Spain. He switched, and first represented the Senegal national team in a friendly 3–1 loss to Morocco on 9 October 2020.

== Career statistics ==
As of end of 2023–24 season

Club	Season	League			National Cup		League Cup		Continental		Other		Total	
Club	Season	Division	Apps	Goals	Apps	Goals	Apps	Goals	Apps	Goals	Apps	Goals	Apps	Goals
Celta Fortuna	2014–15	Segunda División B	3	1	0	0	—		—		—		3	1
Celta Fortuna	2015–16	Segunda División B	18	1	0	0	—		—		—		18	1
Celta Fortuna	Total		21	2	0	0	—		—		—		21	2
Celta Vigo	2015–16	La Liga	6	0	2	0	—		—		—		8	0
Celta Vigo	2016–17	La Liga	16	1	3	0	—		0	0	—		19	1
Celta Vigo	Total		22	1	5	0	—		0	0	—		27	1
Lyon B	2017–18	National 2	10	2	0	0	—		—		—		10	2
Lyon B	2018–19	National 2	2	0	0	0	—		—		—		2	0
Lyon B	2021–22	National 2	1	0	0	0	—		—		—		1	0
Lyon B	Total		13	2	0	0	—		—		—		13	2
Lyon	2017–18	Ligue 1	1	0	0	0	1	0	—		—		2	0
Lyon	2018–19	Ligue 1	12	0	4	0	2	0	5 (Note: Appearances in UEFA Champions League)	0	—		23	0
Lyon	Total		13	0	4	0	3	0	5	0	—		25	0
Celta Vigo (loan)	2019–20	La Liga	16	0	3	0	—		—		—		19	0
Dijon (loan)	2020–21	Ligue 1	21	0	1	0	0	0	—		—		22	0
Aris Thessaloniki	2022–23	Super League	10	0	0	0	—		4 (Note: Appearances in UEFA Conference League)	0	—		14	0
Elche	2022–23	La Liga	2	0	0	0	—		—		—		2	0
DAC	2023–24	Niké liga	1	0	0	0	—		—		—		1	0
Career total			119	5	13	0	3	0	9	0	0	0	144	5

== Honours ==
Spain U19

- UEFA European Under-19 Championship: 2015
