= Manises CF =

Manises
- Full name: Manises Club de Fútbol
- Founded: 1929; 97 years ago
- Ground: Municipal, Manises, Valencian Community, Spain
- Capacity: 1,000
- President: Manuel Regalado
- Head coach: Santi Marín
- League: Lliga Comunitat – North
- 2025–26: Lliga Comunitat – North, 10th of 16
- Website: https://www.manisesclubdefutbol.com/
Home colours	Away colours

Manises Club de Fútbol is a Spanish football team based in Manises in the autonomous Valencian Community. Founded in 1929, they play in Lliga Comunitat – North, holding home games at Polideportivo Municipal de Manises, with a capacity of 1,000 people.

== History ==
Founded in 1929, Manises Club de Fútbol merged with Club Deportivo Saturno in 1934 and was renamed Unión Deportiva Manises. The club achieved a promotion to Tercera División in 1956, but only lasted one season in the third tier before suffering relegation.

In 1994, Manises and the other two clubs from the city (Atlético Manises and Club Deportivo Juventud Manisense) were close to a merger; despite Juventud walking away from the merger, Manises and Atlético did merge and the club regained the denomination of Manises CF. In May 2024, the club qualified to the Copa del Rey for the first time ever.

== Seasons ==
Season	Tier	Division	Place	Copa del Rey
1929–1948	—	Regional	—	
1948–49	5	2ª Reg.	2nd	
1949–50	5	2ª Reg.		
1950–51	5	2ª Reg.		
1951–52	5	2ª Reg.		
1952–53	5	2ª Reg.	7th	
1953–54	5	2ª Reg.	1st	
1954–55	4	1ª Reg.	7th	
1955–56	4	1ª Reg.	6th	
1956–57	3	3ª	16th	
1957–58	4	1ª Reg.	10th	
1958–59	4	1ª Reg.	18th	
1959–60	4	1ª Reg.	8th	
1960–61	4	1ª Reg.	20th	
1961–62	5	2ª Reg.	6th	
1962–63	5	2ª Reg.		
1963–64	5	2ª Reg.	4th	
1964–65	5	2ª Reg.	6th	
1965–66	5	2ª Reg.	1st	
1966–67	4	1ª Reg.	7th	

Season	Tier	Division	Place	Copa del Rey
1967–68	4	1ª Reg.	17th	
1968–69	5	2ª Reg.	11th	
1969–70	5	2ª Reg.	6th	
1970–71	5	1ª Reg.	13th	
1971–72	5	1ª Reg.	13th	
1972–73	5	1ª Reg.	12th	
1973–74	5	1ª Reg.	14th	
1974–75	5	1ª Reg.	3rd	
1975–76	5	1ª Reg.	2nd	
1976–77	4	Reg. Pref.	14th	
1977–78	5	Reg. Pref.	5th	
1978–79	5	Reg. Pref.	5th	
1979–80	5	Reg. Pref.	13th	
1980–81	5	Reg. Pref.	5th	
1981–82	5	Reg. Pref.	19th	
1982–83	6	1ª Reg.	11th	
1983–84	6	1ª Reg.	14th	
1984–85	6	1ª Reg.	17th	
1985–86	6	1ª Reg.	2nd	
1986–87	5	Reg. Pref.	5th	

Season	Tier	Division	Place	Copa del Rey
1987–88	5	Reg. Pref.	16th	
1988–89	5	Reg. Pref.	16th	
1989–90	5	Reg. Pref.	17th	
1990–91	6	1ª Reg.	3rd	
1991–92	6	1ª Reg.	2nd	
1992–93	5	Reg. Pref.	17th	
1993–94	6	1ª Reg.	3rd	
1994–95	6	1ª Reg.	8th	
1995–96	6	1ª Reg.	4th	
1996–97	6	1ª Reg.	2nd	
1997–98	5	Reg. Pref.	9th	
1998–99	5	Reg. Pref.	4th	
1999–2000	5	Reg. Pref.	10th	
2000–01	5	Reg. Pref.	13th	
2001–02	5	Reg. Pref.	11th	
2002–03	5	Reg. Pref.	16th	
2003–04	6	1ª Reg.	3rd	
2004–05	6	1ª Reg.	2nd	
2005–06	5	Reg. Pref.	11th	
2006–07	5	Reg. Pref.	17th	

Season	Tier	Division	Place	Copa del Rey
2007–08	6	1ª Reg.	10th	
2008–09	6	1ª Reg.	8th	
2009–10	6	1ª Reg.	16th	
2010–11	7	2ª Reg.	2nd	
2011–12	6	1ª Reg.	8th	
2012–13	6	1ª Reg.	4th	
2013–14	6	1ª Reg.	3rd	
2014–15	6	1ª Reg.	1st	
2015–16	5	Reg. Pref.	16th	
2016–17	6	1ª Reg.	11th	
2017–18	6	1ª Reg.	4th	
2018–19	6	1ª Reg.	2nd	
2019–20	5	Reg. Pref.	14th	
2020–21	5	Reg. Pref.	4th	
2021–22	6	Reg. Pref.	8th	
2022–23	6	Reg. Pref.	5th	
2023–24	6	Lliga Com.	8th	
2024–25	6	Lliga Com.	13th	First round
2025–26	6	Lliga Com.	10th	
2026–27	6	Lliga Com.		

- 1 season in Tercera División
