= Deportivo Fabril =

Association football club in Spain

- Full name: Real Club Deportivo Fabril
- Nicknames: Fabril, Dépor, Súper Dépor, Turks, Herculinos, Blanquiazules, Branquiazuis
- Founded: 21 February 1914; 112 years ago as Fabril Foot-ball Club
- Stadium: Cidade Deportiva de Abegondo
- Capacity: 1,000
- President: Juan Carlos Escotet
- Head coach: Manuel Pablo
- League: Primera Federación – Group 1
- 2025–26: Segunda Federación – Group 1, 1st of 18 (champions)
- Website: www.rcdeportivo.es/fabril/
Home colours	Away colours	Third colours

Real Club Deportivo Fabril, previously known as Deportivo B, is the reserve team of Real Club Deportivo de A Coruña, it is based in A Coruña, in the autonomous community of Galicia. It currently plays in Primera Federación – Group 1, holding home games at Cidade Deportiva de Abegondo, with a capacity of 3,000 spectators.

== History ==
The origins of Deportivo B can be found in 1914, when is Fabril Sociedad Deportiva is born. In 1963, after a merger with Club Deportivo Juvenil, it officially became the reserve team of Deportivo de A Coruña, being thus renamed Fabril Deportivo.

In 1994 the team was again renamed, this time as Deportivo de La Coruña B. It managed to play four consecutive years in the third division in the mid-90s and another two in the following decade, but competed mostly in the lower leagues.

The club returned to the Tercera División in 1999. In the 2005–06 season, it became the champion of the category, but did not achieve promotion. In the 2006–07 season, it was again crowned champion of the division, and this time succeeded in earning promotion to Segunda B after defeating Don Benito in the promotion play-offs.

On 10 July 2017, after its promotion to Segunda División B by defeating CP Cacereño in the promotion play-offs, Deportivo changed the name of the reserve team to Real Club Deportivo Fabril.

== Season to season ==
- As Fabril SD

Season	Tier	Division	Place	Copa del Rey
1940–41	5	1ª Reg.	5th	
1941–42	4	1ª Reg.	6th	
1942–43	5	2ª Reg.	5th	
1943–44	6	2ª Reg.	3rd	
1944–45	5	1ª Reg.	8th	
1945–46	5	1ª Reg.	5th	
1946–47	5	1ª Reg.	5th	
1947–48	4	Serie A	5th	
1948–49	4	Serie A	3rd	
1949–50	4	Serie A	6th	
1950–51	4	Serie A	1st	
1951–52	4	Serie A	7th	
1952–53	4	Serie A	8th	
1953–54	4	Serie A	1st	

Season	Tier	Division	Place	Copa del Rey
1954–55	3	3ª	7th	
1955–56	3	3ª	7th	
1956–57	3	3ª	8th	
1957–58	3	3ª	7th	
1958–59	3	3ª	13th	
1959–60	3	3ª	11th	
1960–61	3	3ª	12th	
1961–62	3	3ª	8th	
1962–63	3	3ª	8th	
1963–64	3	3ª	2nd	
1964–65	3	3ª	4th	
1965–66	3	3ª	6th	
1966–67	3	3ª	5th	
1967–68	3	3ª	3rd	

- As Fabril Deportivo

Season	Tier	Division	Place	Copa del Rey
1968–69	3	3ª	9th	
1969–70	3	3ª	11th	Third round
1970–71	4	Serie A	2nd	
1971–72	3	3ª	19th	Second round
1972–73	4	Serie A	5th	
1973–74	4	Serie A	5th	
1974–75	4	Serie A	5th	
1975–76	4	Serie A	5th	
1976–77	4	Serie A	1st	
1977–78	4	3ª	6th	Second round
1978–79	4	3ª	17th	Third round
1979–80	4	3ª	16th	First round
1980–81	4	3ª	10th	

Season	Tier	Division	Place	Copa del Rey
1981–82	4	3ª	11th	
1982–83	4	3ª	7th	
1983–84	4	3ª	3rd	
1984–85	4	3ª	10th	First round
1985–86	4	3ª	3rd	
1986–87	4	3ª	11th	First round
1987–88	4	3ª	6th	
1988–89	4	3ª	5th	
1989–90	4	3ª	2nd	
1990–91	4	3ª	4th	DNP
1991–92	3	2ª B	18th	DNP
1992–93	4	3ª	5th	DNP
1993–94	4	3ª	2nd	DNP

- As Deportivo de A Coruña's reserve team

Season	Tier	Division	Place
1994–95	4	3ª	4th
1995–96	3	2ª B	5th
1996–97	3	2ª B	4th
1997–98	3	2ª B	3rd
1998–99	3	2ª B	17th
1999–2000	4	3ª	2nd
2000–01	3	2ª B	20th
2001–02	4	3ª	9th
2002–03	4	3ª	2nd
2003–04	4	3ª	3rd
2004–05	4	3ª	8th
2005–06	4	3ª	1st
2006–07	4	3ª	1st
2007–08	3	2ª B	4th
2008–09	3	2ª B	17th
2009–10	4	3ª	1st
2010–11	3	2ª B	17th
2011–12	4	3ª	6th
2012–13	4	3ª	4th
2013–14	4	3ª	9th

Season	Tier	Division	Place
2014–15	4	3ª	2nd
2015–16	4	3ª	3rd
2016–17	4	3ª	1st
2017–18	3	2ª B	2nd
2018–19	3	2ª B	20th
2019–20	4	3ª	7th
2020–21	4	3ª	5th
2021–22	5	3ª RFEF	5th
2022–23	5	3ª Fed.	1st
2023–24	4	2ª Fed.	9th
2024–25	4	2ª Fed.	4th
2025–26	4	2ª Fed.	1st
2026–27	3	1ª Fed.	

- 1 season in Primera Federación
- 11 seasons in Segunda División B
- 3 seasons in Segunda Federación
- 50 seasons in Tercera División
- 2 seasons in Tercera Federación/Tercera División RFEF

== Current squad ==
As of 7 September 2026

Note: Flags indicate national team as defined under FIFA eligibility rules; some limited exceptions apply. Players may hold more than one non-FIFA nationality.

No.	Pos.	Nation	Player
1	GK	ESP	Álex Marqués
2	DF	ESP	Quique Teijo
3	DF	ESP	Álvaro Mardones
4	DF	ESP	Samu Fernández
6	MF	ESP	Noé Carrillo
8	MF	ESP	Rubén López (captain)
9	FW	ESP	Martín Ochoa
10	FW	ESP	Kevin Sánchez
11	FW	ESP	Adrián Guerrero
13	GK	ESP	Hugo Ríos
14	FW	ESP	David Domínguez
15	DF	ESP	Ferran Seco
16	MF	ESP	Dani Estévez
17	MF	ESP	Koke San José

No.	Pos.	Nation	Player
18	FW	CMR	Rodrigue Dipanda
19	FW	ESP	Iker Gil
20	FW	ESP	Justino Barbosa
21	DF	ESP	Iker Vidal
22	MF	ESP	Yayo González
23	MF	ESP	Manu Ferreiro
24	DF	ESP	Manu Serrano
25	FW	ESP	Álvaro Fraga
27	DF	ESP	Pablo García
29	DF	ESP	Guillermo Pastoriza
30	DF	ESP	Xabi Campos
—	DF	ESP	Damián Canedo
—	MF	ESP	Jairo Noriega

=== From Youth Academy ===
Note: Flags indicate national team as defined under FIFA eligibility rules; some limited exceptions apply. Players may hold more than one non-FIFA nationality.

No.	Pos.	Nation	Player
28	MF	ESP	Mauro Valeiro

=== Out on loan ===
Note: Flags indicate national team as defined under FIFA eligibility rules; some limited exceptions apply. Players may hold more than one non-FIFA nationality.

No.	Pos.	Nation	Player
—	DF	ESP	Hugo Torres (at Arosa until 30 June 2027)
—	DF	ESP	Pablo Parada (at Boiro until 30 June 2027)
—	MF	ESP	Lucas Castro (at Arosa until 30 June 2027)

No.	Pos.	Nation	Player
—	MF	SEN	Malick Ndiaye (at Barbastro until 30 June 2027)
—	FW	ESP	Héctor Areosa (at Extremadura until 30 June 2027)

== Honours ==
- Tercera División: 2005–06, 2006–07, 2009–10, 2016–17
- Segunda Federación: 2025–26
