= Toni Gabarre =

Spanish footballer

Personal information
- Full name: Antonio Gabarre Ballarín
- Date of birth: 26 May 1990 (age 36)
- Place of birth: Huesca, Spain
- Height: 1.86 m (6 ft 1 in)
- Position: Forward

Team information
- Current team: Barbastro
- Number: 20

Youth career
- 2006–2009: Huesca

Senior career*
Years	Team	Apps	(Gls)
2009–2011	Barbastro	62	(21)
2011–2014	Almudévar	101	(78)
2014–2015	Zaragoza B	16	(2)
2015	Alcoyano	9	(0)
2015–2017	Ebro	69	(18)
2017–2018	Llagostera	36	(6)
2018–2019	Tudelano	36	(15)
2019–2020	Atlético Baleares	28	(15)
2020–2021	Numancia	23	(3)
2021–2022	Sabadell	12	(0)
2022	Alcoyano	18	(2)
2022–2023	Calahorra	21	(1)
2023	San Fernando	16	(2)
2023–2024	Teruel	28	(0)
2025	Ejea	7	(1)
2025–	Barbastro	28	(7)
- * Club domestic league appearances and goals as of 15 May 2026

Antonio "Toni" Gabarre Ballarín (born 26 May 1990) is a Spanish footballer who plays as a forward for UD Barbastro.

== Biography ==
Gabarre was born in Huesca, Spain.

He stood out in A. D. Almudévar, a team that was the subsidiary of Sociedad Deportiva Huesca during the years 2011 to 2019. In the Almudévar club he was the pichichi of the Third Division of Spain scoring 31 goals in 40 games during the 2013–14 season.

His records earned him to sign in 2014 for Deportivo Aragón, Real Zaragoza's subsidiary, a team with which he scored 2 goals in 16 games played. In the winter market he headed to C. D. Alcoyano, where he completed the second round of the 2014-15 championship.

After his time at the Alcoy club, he arrived in 2015 to C. D. Ebro. In the Aragonese side he played 71 games over two seasons and accumulated 18 goals, helping the team to stay in Segunda División B.

In 2017 he signed for U. E. Llagostera. There he participated in 38 games and scored 6 goals. After the relegation of the Llagostera team to the Third Division in the 2017–18 season he signed for C. D. Tudelano, a club where he played 36 games and scored 15 goals, achieving the permanence of category having a decisive role thanks to his goals.

On 31 July 2019 he arrived free to C. D. Atlético Baleares, team in which he plays during the 2019–20 season. On 25 August he played his first game with the Balearic side in a 0–1 win against Unión Popular de Langreo. He scored his first goal for the club on 15 September, scoring the third goal in a 3–2 win against Unión Deportiva San Sebastián de los Reyes. He quickly established himself as a starter with the Blue and Whites, highlighting his role as a goal scorer.

In September 2020 he signed for Club Deportivo Numancia de Soria for one season. After that year in Soria, on 1 August 2021, he signed for C. E. Sabadell F. C. to compete in the First Division RFEF. In January 2022 he terminated his contract with the Arlequins and days later his return to C. D. Alcoyano was confirmed. This second stint at the club lasted until the end of the season, joining C. D. Calahorra in August.

On 30 January 2023 he left Calahorra after reaching an agreement to terminate his contract. The next day he signed for San Fernando C. D., where he completed the campaign before joining C. D. Teruel the following season.
