= Rubén López (footballer, born 2004) =

Spanish footballer (born 2004)

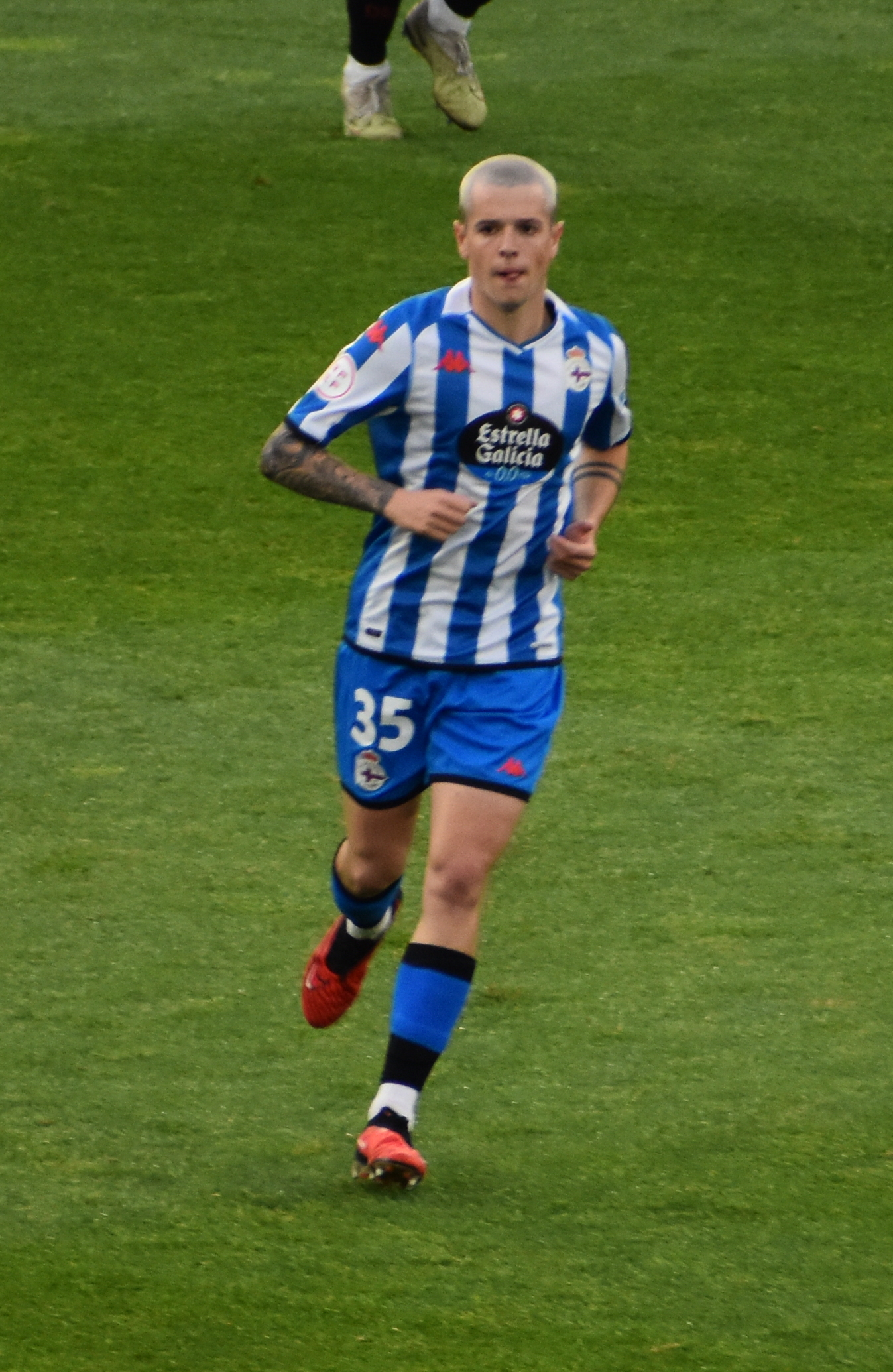
- López playing for Deportivo La Coruña in 2024

Personal information
- Full name: Rubén López Durán
- Date of birth: 26 August 2004 (age 22)
- Place of birth: Silleda, Spain
- Height: 1.75 m (5 ft 9 in)
- Position: Midfielder

Team information
- Current team: Deportivo A Coruña

Youth career
- 2015–2018: Lalín
- 2018–2019: Compostela
- 2019–2023: Deportivo La Coruña

Senior career*
Years	Team	Apps	(Gls)
2022–2024	Deportivo B	22	(1)
2024–	Deportivo A Coruña	22	(1)
2024–2025	→ Barcelona B (loan)	35	(2)
2026	→ Pontevedra (loan)	14	(0)
- * Club domestic league appearances and goals as of 9 June 2026

Rubén López Durán (born 26 August 2004) is a Spanish footballer who plays for Deportivo de A Coruña. Mainly a midfielder, he can also play as a left-back.

== Career ==
Born in Lamela, Silleda, Pontevedra, Galicia, López joined Deportivo de La Coruña's youth sides in 2018, after representing SD Compostela and EF Lalín. He made his senior debut with the reserves on 18 September 2022, coming on as a second-half substitute in a 1–1 Tercera Federación home draw against Alondras CF.

López made his first team debut on 5 November 2023, replacing José Ángel late into a 3–0 Primera Federación away loss to Real Unión. On 13 December, he renewed his contract until 2028.

López scored his first goal for Dépor on 28 January 2024, netting the winner in a 2–1 away success over RC Celta Fortuna, and featured in 20 matches during the season as the club achieved promotion to Segunda División. On 30 August, however, he left on a one-year loan deal at FC Barcelona Atlètic.

López was regularly used at Barça, but often deployed in other positions. Despite featuring in 35 matches and scoring twice, he returned to his parent club on 30 June 2025, after suffering relegation.

López made his professional debut on 27 September 2025, playing the last nine minutes of a 1–1 away draw against SD Eibar. The following 2 February, after being rarely used, he was loaned to Pontevedra CF in the third division until June.
