= San Fernando CD =

Association football club

San Fernando
- Full name: San Fernando Club Deportivo Isleño
- Nickname: Blue Band, Sanfer
- Founded: 2009
- Dissolved: 7 August 2025
- Ground: Bahía Sur, San Fernando, Andalusia, Spain
- Capacity: 8,000
- President: Louis Kinziger
- Head coach: Nano Rivas
- 2024–25: Segunda Federación – Group 4, 16th of 18 (relegated)
- Website: sanfernandocd.com
Home colours	Away colours

San Fernando Club Deportivo Isleño was a Spanish football team based in San Fernando, Cádiz, in the autonomous community of Andalusia. Founded in 2009 and dissolved in 2025, they held home matches at Estadio Bahía Sur, with a capacity of 8,000 seats.

== History ==
In June 2009, historical town club CD San Fernando - played one full decade in Segunda División - was dissolved due to insurmountable economic problems, being renamed San Fernando Club Deportivo. Another local outfit, Unión Sporting (founded in 2000), had its berth bought by the new organization, which started competing in Primera Andaluza. San Fernando's first game took place on 2 August 2009, against Sevilla Atlético at Bahía Sur, with the hosts winning 2–0. In its first season, 2009-10, San Fernando certified promotion to Tercera División with a 1–8 away victory against CD San Roque in the last regular season game and knocking out CD Utrera in the promotion playoff.

The side first reached Tercera División in the 2010–11 season, finishing in second position in the regular season but being ousted in the playoffs by La Roda CF (two losses, 0–4 on aggregate). Finally the club reached Segunda División B in the next, 2011–2012 season.

San Fernando managed to qualify to the new third division Primera División RFEF in 2021, but suffered relegation in 2024. In 2025, another relegation from Segunda Federación followed, and the club was moved further down to the División de Honor on 15 July of that year, after the club was unable to register the senior side within the Tercera Federación deadline date. On 24 July, the city council confirmed the club's dissolution to be held on 7 August, with a new club named CD San Fernando 1940 to start in Tercera Andaluza.

== Season to season ==
Season	Tier	Division	Place	Copa del Rey
2009–10	5	1ª And.	2nd	
2010–11	4	3ª	2nd	
2011–12	4	3ª	2nd	
2012–13	3	2ª B	7th	
2013–14	3	2ª B	18th	Second round
2014–15	4	3ª	2nd	
2015–16	4	3ª	3rd	
2016–17	3	2ª B	15th	

Season	Tier	Division	Place	Copa del Rey
2017–18	3	2ª B	9th	
2018–19	3	2ª B	8th	
2019–20	3	2ª B	6th	
2020–21	3	2ª B	2nd / 5th	First round
2021–22	3	1ª RFEF	15th	First round
2022–23	3	1ª Fed.	13th	
2023–24	3	1ª Fed.	16th	
2024–25	4	2ª Fed.	16th	

- 3 seasons in Primera Federación/Primera División RFEF
- 7 seasons in Segunda División B
- 1 season in Segunda Federación
- 4 seasons in Tercera División

== Current squad ==
As of 1 March 2024.

Note: Flags indicate national team as defined under FIFA eligibility rules; some limited exceptions apply. Players may hold more than one non-FIFA nationality.

No.	Pos.	Nation	Player
1	GK	ESP	Diego Fuoli
2	DF	ESP	Lillo Castellano
3	DF	ESP	Luis Ruiz
4	DF	ESP	Manuel Farrando
5	DF	ESP	Carlos Blanco
6	MF	ESP	Dani Molina
7	FW	FRA	Jonathan Biabiany (captain)
8	MF	ESP	Alfonso Martín
9	FW	ESP	Toni Gabarre
10	MF	ESP	David Ramos
11	FW	ESP	Dani Aquino

No.	Pos.	Nation	Player
12	DF	ESP	Ángel López (on loan from Algeciras)
13	GK	ESP	Egoitz Arana
14	MF	ESP	Francesc Fullana
15	DF	ESP	Víctor Ruiz
16	MF	ESP	Cristian Herrera
17	FW	ESP	Ángel Sánchez
18	MF	ESP	Unai Naveira
19	MF	ESP	Pau Martínez
21	FW	ESP	Nahuel Arroyo
23	DF	ESP	José Carlos Ramírez
25	MF	ESP	Yerai Dávila

=== Reserve team ===
Note: Flags indicate national team as defined under FIFA eligibility rules; some limited exceptions apply. Players may hold more than one non-FIFA nationality.

No.	Pos.	Nation	Player
26	MF	ARG	Marcos Renzi
27	MF	ESP	Matheo André

=== Out on loan ===
Note: Flags indicate national team as defined under FIFA eligibility rules; some limited exceptions apply. Players may hold more than one non-FIFA nationality.

No.	Pos.	Nation	Player
—	GK	ARG	Matías Ramos Mingo (at Xerez Deportivo until 30 June 2024)
