= Alfonso Martín =

Spanish footballer

Personal information
- Full name: Alfonso Martín Castillo
- Date of birth: 10 June 1994 (age 32)
- Place of birth: Jerez de la Frontera, Spain
- Height: 1.82 m (6 ft 0 in)
- Position: Midfielder

Youth career
- Xerez

Senior career*
Years	Team	Apps	(Gls)
2013	Xerez B	1	(0)
2013	Xerez	3	(0)
2013–2014	Córdoba B	7	(0)
2014	Écija	12	(0)
2014–2016	Guadalcacín	70	(2)
2016–2017	Linense	30	(2)
2017–2018	Vitoria	27	(0)
2018–2019	Melilla	35	(3)
2019–2021	Alcorcón	0	(0)
2019–2020	→ Cultural Leonesa (loan)	23	(0)
2020–2021	→ Atlético Baleares (loan)	12	(0)
2021–2023	Atlético Baleares	37	(0)
2023–2024	San Fernando	21	(0)
- * Club domestic league appearances and goals as of 11 April 2024

Alfonso Martín Castillo (born 10 June 1994), sometimes known as Alfonsito, is a Spanish footballer who plays as a midfielder.

== Club career ==
Born in Jerez de la Frontera, Cádiz, Martín graduated from Xerez CD's youth system, and made his senior debut with the reserves on 7 January 2013, against GE Bazán CF.

On 3 May 2013, Martín made his debut for the first team, in a 1–3 home defeat against Córdoba CF in the Segunda División championship. In August he moved to the latter, being assigned to the B-side in Segunda División B.

In January 2014, after being rarely used, Martín moved to Écija Balompié also in the third division. On 21 August, he joined Tercera División side CD Guadalcacín.

On 11 July 2016, Martín returned to the third level after agreeing to a contract with Real Balompédica Linense. Roughly one year later he signed for another reserve team, CD Vitoria in the same division.

On 2 August 2018, Martín signed for UD Melilla still in the third tier. The following 12 July, he agreed to a three-year contract with AD Alcorcón in the second division, but was immediately loaned to Cultural y Deportiva Leonesa for one year.

On 25 August 2020, Martín was loaned to fellow third division side CD Atlético Baleares for the 2020–21 campaign.
