= EF Dolorense =

Association football club in Spain

Dolorense
- Full name: Escuela de Fútbol Dolorense
- Founded: 1905; 121 years ago
- Ground: La Alameda
- Capacity: 1,000
- President: José Manuel Rico Costa
- Manager: Tano Moltó
- League: Primera Autonómica – Group 1
- 2024–25: Segunda Autonómica – Group 1, 4th of 12 (promoted)
Home colours	Away colours

Escuela de Fútbol Dolorense is a Spanish football club based in Cartagena, in the Region of Murcia. Founded in 1905, they play in Primera Autonómica – Group 1, holding home games at the Campo de Fútbol La Alameda.

== History ==
Founded in 1905 as Unión Deportiva Dolorense, the club was known as Atlético Salesianos in the 1970s and as Agrupación Vecinal Dolorense-Salesianos during the 1980s. The club played their last senior season in 1984–85 before focusing solely on youth football, until reactivating an under-23 side in September 2023.

On 23 June 2024, Dolorense qualified to the 2024–25 Copa del Rey after winning the Supercopa Regional.

== Season to season ==
Season	Tier	Division	Place	Copa del Rey
1940–41	5	2ª Reg.	2nd	
1941–42	4	2ª Reg.		
1942–1971	DNP			
1972–73	6	2ª Reg.	12th	
1973–1980	DNP			
1980–81	7	2ª Reg.	8th	
1981–82	DNP			
1982–83	DNP			
1983–84	DNP			
1984–85	7	2ª Reg.	12th	
1985–2024	DNP			
2024–25	8	2ª Aut.	4th	Preliminary
2025–26	7	1ª Aut.		
