= Jairo Noriega =

Spanish footballer

Personal information
- Full name: Jairo Noriega Figueroa
- Date of birth: 14 August 2003 (age 23)
- Place of birth: A Coruña, Spain
- Height: 1.82 m (6 ft 0 in)
- Position: Midfielder

Team information
- Current team: Deportivo B

Youth career
- Calasanz
- 2011–2017: Deportivo La Coruña
- 2017–2018: San Tirso
- 2018–2022: Deportivo La Coruña

Senior career*
Years	Team	Apps	(Gls)
2021–2024	Deportivo B	40	(3)
2023–2024	Deportivo La Coruña	0	(0)
2024–2025	Ourense	29	(2)
2025–	Deportivo B	0	(0)
2025–2026	→ Racing Ferrol (loan)	32	(2)
- * Club domestic league appearances and goals as of 9 June 2026

Jairo Noriega Figueroa (born 14 August 2003) is a Spanish professional footballer who plays as a midfielder for Deportivo Fabril.

== Career ==
Born in A Coruña, Galicia, Noriega began his career with Colegio Calasanz PP Escolapios, before joining the youth categories of Deportivo de La Coruña in June 2011, aged seven. He made his senior debut with the reserves on 28 February 2021, coming on as a late substitute in a 2–1 Tercera División home loss to Bergantiños FC.

On 1 June 2021, Noriega renewed his contract with the club until 2024, but struggled with injuries and having COVID-19 twice, being sidelined for nearly six months. He only became a regular starter for Fabril during the 2022–23 season, as the side achieved promotion to Segunda Federación.

Noriega made his first team debut on 1 November 2023, starting in a 3–1 away win over CD Covadonga, for the campaign's Copa del Rey. On 30 August of the following year, he left Dépor and joined Primera Federación side Ourense CF.

On 26 June 2025, Noriega returned to his previous club Deportivo on a three-year deal, but was loaned to Racing de Ferrol in the third division on 4 July.

== Honours ==
Deportivo La Coruña

- Primera Federación: 2023–24
