= Noé Carrillo =

Spanish footballer

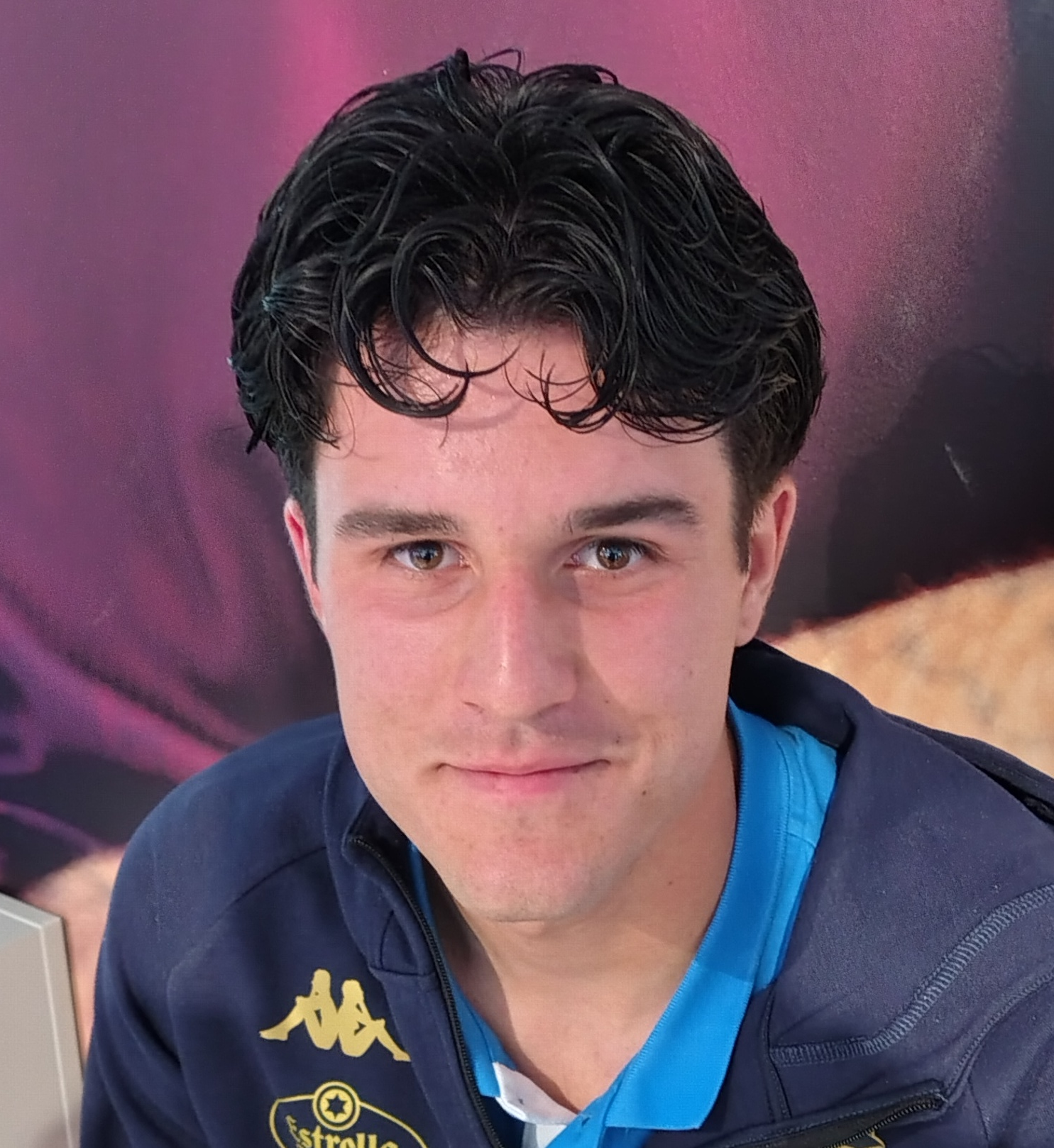
- Carrillo in 2026

Personal information
- Full name: Noé Carrillo Collazo
- Date of birth: 28 December 2006 (age 19)
- Place of birth: Teo, Spain
- Height: 1.76 m (5 ft 9 in)
- Position: Midfielder

Team information
- Current team: Deportivo B
- Number: 6

Youth career
- 2012–2015: Praíña
- 2015–2018: Santiago
- 2018–2019: Conxo Santiago
- 2019–2024: Deportivo La Coruña

Senior career*
Years	Team	Apps	(Gls)
2024–	Deportivo B	32	(2)
2025–	Deportivo A Coruña	4	(1)
- * Club domestic league appearances and goals as of 14 May 2026

Noé Carrillo Collazo (born 28 December 2006) is a Spanish professional footballer who plays as a midfielder for Deportivo Fabril.

== Career ==
Born in Teo, A Coruña, Galicia, Carrillo began his career in futsal with hometown side Club San Francisco Teo, before switching to football at the age of six with Praíña SC. He left the club aged eight to join Santiago de Compostela CF, and spent a year at CD Conxo Santiago after Conxo absorbed Santiago, before moving to Deportivo de La Coruña's youth categories in 2019.

On 6 June 2024, Carrillo renewed his contract with Dépor until 2027, and made his senior debut with the reserves on 31 August, playing the last 13 minutes of a 1–0 Segunda Federación home loss to Real Ávila CF. He quickly established himself as a starter for the B's, but suffered an injury in November which sidelined him for the remainder of the season.

Back to action in July 2025, Carrillo played six consecutive matches for the B-side before spending two months sidelined due to an ankle injury. He made his first team debut on 16 December, coming on as a late substitute for Diego Villares and scoring the winner in a 1–0 home success over RCD Mallorca, for the campaign's Copa del Rey.
