= Isaac Nana Asare =

Ghanaian footballer

Nana
Personal information
- Full name: Isaac Nana Asare
- Date of birth: 1 January 1994 (age 32)
- Place of birth: Accra, Ghana
- Height: 1.86 m (6 ft 1 in)
- Position: Midfielder

Team information
- Current team: Barbastro
- Number: 15

Youth career
- Alcalá

Senior career*
Years	Team	Apps	(Gls)
2011–2013	Alcalá	24	(0)
2013	Rayo Vallecano B	12	(0)
2013–2014	Atlético Madrid B	34	(6)
2014–2016	Recreativo	6	(0)
2016	Cádiz	15	(1)
2016–2017	Fuenlabrada	25	(3)
2018	Mérida	12	(0)
2018–2019	Badalona	34	(0)
2019–2020	Cornellà	25	(1)
2020–2021	Racing Santander	13	(2)
2021–2023	Cornellà	51	(2)
2023–2024	Atlético Baleares	30	(0)
2026–	Barbastro	14	(0)
- * Club domestic league appearances and goals as of 15 May 2026

Isaac Nana Asare (born 1 January 1994), simply known as Nana, is a Ghanaian footballer who plays for Segunda Federación club Barbastro as a midfielder.

== Club career ==
Born in Accra, Nana started playing as a senior with RSD Alcalá in the 2011–12 campaign, in Spanish Segunda División B. On the 31st day of January 2013 he moved to Rayo Vallecano, being assigned to the reserves also in the third level.

On 31 July 2013 Nana joined another reserve team, Atlético Madrid B in the same division. He appeared regularly for the club in the season, playing in 34 matches (2634 minutes of action).

On 11 July 2014 Nana signed a four-year deal with Segunda División's Recreativo de Huelva. He made his professional debut on 10 September, starting in a 2–1 home win over SD Ponferradina for the campaign's Copa del Rey.

Nana appeared rarely for Recre during the campaign, as his side suffered relegation. On 3 February 2016, after making no appearances in the previous six months, he joined Cádiz CF.

Nana continued to appear in the third division in the following years, representing CF Fuenlabrada, Mérida AD, CF Badalona, UE Cornellà and Racing de Santander.
