= Pau Martínez =

Spanish footballer

Personal information
- Full name: Pau Martínez Gil
- Date of birth: 10 November 2000 (age 25)
- Place of birth: Blanes, Spain
- Height: 1.68 m (5 ft 6 in)
- Position: Winger

Youth career
- Tordera
- Damm
- 2011–2018: Barcelona
- 2018–2019: Espanyol

Senior career*
Years	Team	Apps	(Gls)
2019–2020	Espanyol B	22	(3)
2020–2021	Andorra	22	(2)
2021–2023	Osasuna B	69	(14)
2023–2024	San Fernando	32	(2)
2024–2025	Unionistas	34	(3)
2025–2026	Gimnàstic	30	(2)
- * Club domestic league appearances and goals as of 10 June 2026

Pau Martínez Gil (born 10 November 2000) is a Spanish footballer who plays mainly as a right winger.

== Career ==
Born in Blanes, Girona, Catalonia, Martínez began his career with CF Tordera, and played for CF Damm before joining FC Barcelona's La Masia in 2011, aged ten. He left the club in 2018, and subsequently moved to RCD Espanyol.

Martínez made his senior debut with Espanyol's reserves on 24 February 2019, coming on as a late substitute for goalscorer Álex Bermejo in a 3–0 Segunda División B home win over CE Sabadell FC, and scored his first goal with the side on 28 April, netting the third in a home success over CD Teruel for the same scoreline. On 4 August 2020, however, he left the Pericos after failing to establish himself as a regular starter for the B's, and signed for fellow third division side FC Andorra the following day.

On 8 July 2021, Martínez moved to another reserve team, CA Osasuna B of the Segunda División RFEF. He helped the side to achieve promotion to Primera Federación in his first season by scoring nine goals, and added a further five in his second.

On 5 August 2023, Martínez was announced at third division side San Fernando CD. The following 17 June, after suffering relegation, he moved to fellow league team Unionistas de Salamanca CF.

On 4 July 2025, Martínez agreed to a two-year contract with Gimnàstic de Tarragona, still in division three. On 18 August of the following year, he terminated his link with the club.
