= Ángel Sánchez (footballer, born 1997) =

Spanish footballer

Personal information
- Full name: Ángel Sánchez Baró
- Date of birth: 28 July 1997 (age 29)
- Place of birth: Palma, Spain
- Height: 1.72 m (5 ft 8 in)
- Position: Winger

Team information
- Current team: Orihuela
- Number: 12

Youth career
- Mallorca

Senior career*
Years	Team	Apps	(Gls)
2014–2018	Mallorca B	78	(15)
2017	Mallorca	1	(0)
2018–2019	Espanyol B	1	(0)
2019	→ Badalona (loan)	9	(0)
2019–2020	Salamanca	10	(1)
2020	Barakaldo	6	(0)
2020–2021	Tudelano	24	(9)
2021–2022	Alcoyano	14	(2)
2022–2023	Eldense	16	(8)
2023	→ Logroñés (loan)	8	(1)
2023–2024	San Fernando	30	(3)
2024–2025	Ourense CF	29	(3)
2025–	Orihuela	28	(4)
- * Club domestic league appearances and goals as of 16 May 2026

Ángel Sánchez Baró (born 28 July 1997) is a Spanish footballer who plays as a winger for Segunda Federación club Orihuela.

== Football career ==
Born in Palma, Majorca, Balearic Islands, Sánchez was a RCD Mallorca youth graduate. He made his senior debut with the reserves on 21 April 2014, coming on as a late substitute for Brandon in a 3–1 Tercera División away win against CD Atlético Rafal.

On 19 December 2015 Sánchez scored his first senior goals, as well as his first hat-trick, netting four times in a 5–1 home routing of SCR Peña Deportiva. He contributed with 19 appearances and five goals during the campaign, as his side achieved promotion to the Segunda División B.

On 6 January 2017 Sánchez made his first-team debut, replacing fellow youth graduate James in a 2–0 home win against CD Mirandés in the Segunda División.

On 14 May 2018 Sánchez had a trial with Liverpool U23s scoring the winning goal against Panjab FA. On 9 July, he signed a two-year deal with another reserve team, RCD Espanyol B of the third division.
