= Cristhian Britos =

Uruguayan footballer (born 1990)

Personal information
- Full name: Cristhian Adrián Britos Rodríguez
- Date of birth: 7 September 1990 (age 36)
- Place of birth: Montevideo, Uruguay
- Height: 1.85 m (6 ft 1 in)
- Position: Midfielder

Team information
- Current team: Cieza

Youth career
- Tigre

Senior career*
Years	Team	Apps	(Gls)
2011	Tigre	0	(0)
2011–2012	Boston River	13	(0)
2013–2014	Canadian	22	(4)
2014–2016	Huracán	18	(1)
2016–2018	Sud América	18	(0)
2017	→ Crucero del Norte (loan)	18	(0)
2017–2018	→ Lorca Deportiva (loan)	24	(7)
2018–2020	UCAM Murcia	25	(2)
2020–2021	Lorca Deportiva	17	(0)
2021	Mar Menor	0	(0)
2021–2023	Orihuela	55	(0)
2023–2025	Minera	61	(8)
2025–	Cieza	2	(0)
- * Club domestic league appearances and goals as of 13 September 2025

Cristhian Adrián Britos Rodríguez (born 7 September 1990) is an Uruguayan footballer who plays for Spanish Tercera Federación club Cieza as a midfielder.
