= UD Barbastro =

Association football club in Spain

Barbastro
- Full name: Unión Deportiva Barbastro
- Founded: 2 October 1934; 92 years ago
- Stadium: Municipal de Deportes, Barbastro, Aragon, Spain
- Capacity: 5,000
- President: Josan Hierro
- Head coach: Dani Martinez
- League: Segunda Federación – Group 2
- 2025–26: Segunda Federación – Group 2, 11th of 18
Home colours	Away colours

Unión Deportiva Barbastro is a Spanish football team based in Barbastro, in the autonomous community of Aragon. Founded in 1934, it plays in Segunda Federación – Group 2, holding home games at Estadio Municipal de Deportes, with a capacity of 5,000 seats.

== Season to season ==
Season	Tier	Division	Place	Copa del Rey
1949–50	4	1ª Reg.	5th	
1950–51	4	1ª Reg.	4th	
1951–52	4	1ª Reg.	10th	
1952–53	5	2ª Reg.	3rd	
1953–54	4	1ª Reg.	16th	
1954–55	5	2ª Reg.	7th	
1955–56	4	1ª Reg.	6th	
1956–57	3	3ª	7th	
1957–58	3	3ª	6th	
1958–59	3	3ª	13th	
1959–60	4	1ª Reg.	5th	
1960–61	4	1ª Reg.	2nd	
1961–62	3	3ª	6th	
1962–63	3	3ª	13th	
1963–64	3	3ª	11th	
1964–65	3	3ª	4th	
1965–66	3	3ª	5th	
1966–67	3	3ª	6th	
1967–68	3	3ª	4th	
1968–69	3	3ª	11th	

Season	Tier	Division	Place	Copa del Rey
1969–70	3	3ª	13th	
1970–71	4	Reg. Pref.	3rd	
1971–72	4	Reg. Pref.	2nd	
1972–73	4	Reg. Pref.	1st	
1973–74	3	3ª	16th	
1974–75	4	Reg. Pref.	7th	
1975–76	4	Reg. Pref.	6th	
1976–77	4	Reg. Pref.	8th	
1977–78	5	Reg. Pref.	4th	
1978–79	5	Reg. Pref.	7th	
1979–80	5	Reg. Pref.	6th	
1980–81	5	Reg. Pref.	2nd	
1981–82	5	Reg. Pref.	2nd	
1982–83	5	Reg. Pref.	1st	
1983–84	4	3ª	9th	
1984–85	4	3ª	17th	
1985–86	5	Reg. Pref.	3rd	
1986–87	4	3ª	5th	
1987–88	4	3ª	4th	First round
1988–89	4	3ª	1st	

Season	Tier	Division	Place	Copa del Rey
1989–90	3	2ª B	20th	
1990–91	4	3ª	2nd	First round
1991–92	4	3ª	2nd	First round
1992–93	4	3ª	3rd	First round
1993–94	4	3ª	4th	
1994–95	4	3ª	4th	
1995–96	4	3ª	4th	
1996–97	4	3ª	2nd	
1997–98	4	3ª	6th	
1998–99	4	3ª	4th	
1999–2000	4	3ª	4th	
2000–01	4	3ª	9th	
2001–02	4	3ª	6th	
2002–03	4	3ª	4th	
2003–04	4	3ª	6th	
2004–05	4	3ª	1st	
2005–06	4	3ª	2nd	First round
2006–07	3	2ª B	20th	Second round
2007–08	4	3ª	2nd	
2008–09	4	3ª	9th	

Season	Tier	Division	Place	Copa del Rey
2009–10	4	3ª	13th	
2010–11	4	3ª	6th	
2011–12	4	3ª	10th	
2012–13	4	3ª	15th	
2013–14	4	3ª	9th	
2014–15	4	3ª	20th	
2015–16	5	Reg. Pref.	13th	
2016–17	5	Reg. Pref.	6th	
2017–18	5	Reg. Pref.	6th	
2018–19	5	Reg. Pref.	2nd	
2019–20	4	3ª	11th	
2020–21	4	3ª	4th / 1st	
2021–22	5	3ª RFEF	8th	
2022–23	5	3ª Fed.	2nd	
2023–24	4	2ª Fed.	8th	Round of 32
2024–25	4	2ª Fed.	13th	Round of 32
2025–26	4	2ª Fed.	11th	
2026–27	4	2ª Fed.		

- 2 seasons in Segunda División B
- 4 seasons in Segunda Federación
- 44 seasons in Tercera División
- 2 seasons in Tercera Federación/Tercera División RFEF

== Honours ==
- Tercera División

Winners (2): 1988–89, 2004–05
Runners-up (5): 1990–91, 1991–92, 1996–97, 2005–06, 2007–08

In a world cup qualifiers game on the 20th of June 2025 against England, the player Ian Olivera of UD Barbastro was given a few rounds of changing through the game, gaining him, and the club, a small gaining in popularity.

== Current squad ==
As of 8 February 2026

Note: Flags indicate national team as defined under FIFA eligibility rules; some limited exceptions apply. Players may hold more than one non-FIFA nationality.

No.	Pos.	Nation	Player
2	DF	ESP	Yeray Izquierdo
4	DF	ESP	Eduardo Mingotes
5	MF	ESP	Derik Osede
6	MF	ESP	Ibra Camara
7	DF	ESP	Hugo Bautista
8	MF	ESP	Oscar Caro
9	FW	ESP	Iván Estrecha
10	FW	ESP	Rodrigo Sanz
11	FW	ESP	Aarón Fernández
12	MF	CMR	Ernesten Lavsamba
13	GK	ESP	Rubén Cebollada
14	FW	ESP	Eder Iribarren

No.	Pos.	Nation	Player
15	MF	GHA	Isaac Nana Asare
17	FW	BUL	Kun
18	FW	ESP	Isaac Boudaoud
19	FW	ESP	Lucas Acín
20	FW	ESP	Toni Gabarre
21	DF	ESP	Andrés Barrera
22	DF	ESP	Manu Cardiel (on loan from Deportivo Aragón)
23	DF	ESP	Raúl Alarcón (on loan from Huesca B)
24	MF	ESP	Dani Cuenca
25	GK	ESP	David Troya
31	GK	ESP	Diego Suelves

== Famous players ==
- (Equatorial Guinea) Sergio Barila
- (Spain) Francisco Borrego
- (Spain) Miguel Linares
- (Spain) José Antonio Métola
- (Spain) Eduardo Navarro
