= CD Promesas EDF =

Spanish association football club

Promesas EDF
- Full name: Club Deportivo Promesas Escuelas de Fútbol
- Founded: 2011 (EDF Logroño); 2023; 3 years ago
- Ground: Pradoviejo, Logroño, La Rioja, Spain
- Capacity: 2,000
- President: Francisco Javier Rivillas Soria
- Head coach: Miguel San Martin
- League: Regional Preferente
- 2025–26: Regional Preferente, 7th of 18
Home colours	Away colours

Club Deportivo Promesas Escuela de Fútbol is a Spanish football team based in Logroño, in the autonomous community of La Rioja. Founded in 2023, they are the men's section of Dux Logroño, and play in Regional Preferente, holding home matches at Ciudad Deportiva Pradoviejo.

Dux Logroño had a senior men's team between 2011 and 2013, which played under the name of Club Deportivo Escuelas de Fútbol Logroño.

== Season to season ==
=== EDF Logroño ===
Season	Tier	Division	Place	Copa del Rey
2011–12	5	Reg. Pref.	7th	
2012–13	5	Reg. Pref.	6th	

=== Promesas EDF ===
Season	Tier	Division	Place	Copa del Rey
2023–24	6	Reg. Pref.	2nd	
2024–25	6	Reg. Pref.	13th	Preliminary
2025–26	6	Reg. Pref.		
