= CD Gévora =

Association football team in Spain

Gévora
- Full name: Club Deportivo Gévora
- Founded: 1962
- Ground: Municipal, Gévora, Badajoz,Extremadura, Spain
- Capacity: 1,000
- President: José Mateos
- Manager: Martín Fernández
- League: Tercera Federación – Group 14
- 2025–26: Tercera Federación – Group 14, 14th of 18
Home colours	Away colours

Club Deportivo Gévora is a football team based in Gévora, Badajoz, in the autonomous community of Extremadura. Founded in 1962, they play in Tercera Federación – Group 14, holding home matches at the Campo de Fútbol Municipal de Gévora, with a capacity of 1,000 people.

== Season to season ==
Season	Tier	Division	Place	Copa del Rey
1975–76	6	2ª Reg.	1st	
1976–77	6	2ª Reg.	5th	
1977–1989	DNP			
1989–90	6	1ª Reg.	2nd	
1990–91	5	Reg. Pref.	13th	
1991–92	5	Reg. Pref.	20th	
1992–93	6	1ª Reg.	4th	
1993–94	6	1ª Reg.	11th	
1994–95	DNP			
1995–96	6	1ª Reg.	7th	
1996–97	6	1ª Reg.	9th	
1997–98	DNP			
1998–99	DNP			
1999–2000	DNP			
2000–01	6	1ª Reg.	3rd	
2001–02	6	1ª Reg.	1st	
2002–03	5	Reg. Pref.	13th	
2003–04	5	Reg. Pref.	4th	
2004–05	5	Reg. Pref.	6th	
2005–06	5	Reg. Pref.	15th	

Season	Tier	Division	Place	Copa del Rey
2006–07	5	Reg. Pref.	14th	
2007–08	5	Reg. Pref.	19th	
2008–09	6	1ª Reg.	4th	
2009–10	6	1ª Reg.	10th	
2010–11	6	1ª Reg.	13th	
2011–12	6	1ª Reg.	3rd	
2012–13	6	1ª Reg.	4th	
2013–14	6	1ª Reg.	2nd	
2014–15	5	Reg. Pref.	10th	
2015–16	5	Reg. Pref.	11th	
2016–17	5	1ª Ext.	10th	
2017–18	5	1ª Ext.	7th	
2018–19	5	1ª Ext.	13th	
2019–20	5	1ª Ext.	4th	
2020–21	5	1ª Ext.	4th	
2021–22	6	1ª Ext.	3rd	
2022–23	6	1ª Ext.	2nd	
2023–24	6	1ª Ext.	2nd	
2024–25	6	1ª Ext.	1st	First round
2025–26	5	3ª Fed.	14th	

Season	Tier	Division	Place	Copa del Rey
2026–27	5	3ª Fed.		

- 2 seasons in Tercera Federación
