= CD Villamuriel =

Association football club in Spain

Villamuriel
- Full name: Club Deportivo Villamuriel
- Founded: 17 September 1976; 50 years ago
- Ground: Rafael Vázquez Sedano
- Capacity: 1,000
- President: Raúl Aparicio
- Manager: Pablo López "Tuco"
- League: Primera Regional – Group A
- 2025–26: Primera Regional – Group A, 8th of 16
Home colours	Away colours

Club Deportivo Villamuriel is a Spanish football club based in Villamuriel de Cerrato, Palencia, in the autonomous community of Castile and León. Founded on 17 September 1976, it plays in Primera Regional – Group A, holding home games at Campo Municipal Rafael Vázquez Sedano, with a capacity of 1,000 people.

== History ==
Founded on 17 September 1976, the club played in the regional leagues until 2015, when they achieved a first-ever promotion to Tercera División. After suffering relegation two years later, the club only returned to a national competition after qualifying to the 2024–25 Copa del Rey, after CD Mojados achieved promotion to Tercera Federación.

== Season to season ==
Season	Tier	Division	Place	Copa del Rey
1976–77	6	2ª Reg.	2nd	
1977–78	6	1ª Reg.	9th	
1978–79	6	1ª Reg.	5th	
1979–80	6	1ª Reg.	6th	
1980–81	6	1ª Reg.	2nd	
1981–82	5	Reg. Pref.	12th	
1982–83	5	Reg. Pref.	16th	
1983–84	6	1ª Reg.	4th	
1984–85	6	1ª Reg.	4th	
1985–86	6	1ª Reg.	7th	
1986–87	6	1ª Reg.	4th	
1987–88	6	1ª Reg.	4th	
1988–89	6	1ª Reg.	9th	
1989–90	6	1ª Reg.	5th	
1990–91	6	1ª Reg.	2nd	
1991–92	5	Reg. Pref.	8th	
1992–93	5	Reg. Pref.	12th	
1993–94	5	Reg. Pref.	8th	
1994–95	5	Reg. Pref.	16th	
1995–96	6	1ª Reg.	12th	

Season	Tier	Division	Place	Copa del Rey
1996–97	6	1ª Reg.	3rd	
1997–98	6	1ª Reg.	7th	
1998–99	6	1ª Reg.	1st	
1999–2000	5	1ª Reg.	17th	
2000–01	6	1ª Prov.	2nd	
2001–02	6	1ª Prov.	4th	
2002–03	6	1ª Prov.	6th	
2003–04	6	1ª Prov.	6th	
2004–05	6	1ª Prov.	3rd	
2005–06	6	1ª Prov.	1st	
2006–07	5	1ª Reg.	7th	
2007–08	5	1ª Reg.	8th	
2008–09	5	1ª Reg.	6th	
2009–10	5	1ª Reg.	4th	
2010–11	5	1ª Reg.	8th	
2011–12	5	1ª Reg.	6th	
2012–13	5	1ª Reg.	9th	
2013–14	5	1ª Reg.	6th	
2014–15	5	1ª Reg.	2nd	
2015–16	4	3ª	13th	

Season	Tier	Division	Place	Copa del Rey
2016–17	4	3ª	18th	
2017–18	5	1ª Reg.	8th	
2018–19	5	1ª Reg.	7th	
2019–20	5	1ª Reg.	12th	
2020–21	5	1ª Reg.	4th	
2021–22	6	1ª Reg.	6th	
2022–23	6	1ª Reg.	13th	
2023–24	6	1ª Reg.	2nd	
2024–25	6	1ª Reg.	6th	First round
2025–26	6	1ª Reg.	8th	
2026–27	6	1ª Reg.		

- 2 seasons in Tercera División
