= Ontiñena =

Coordinates: 41°40′N 0°05′E

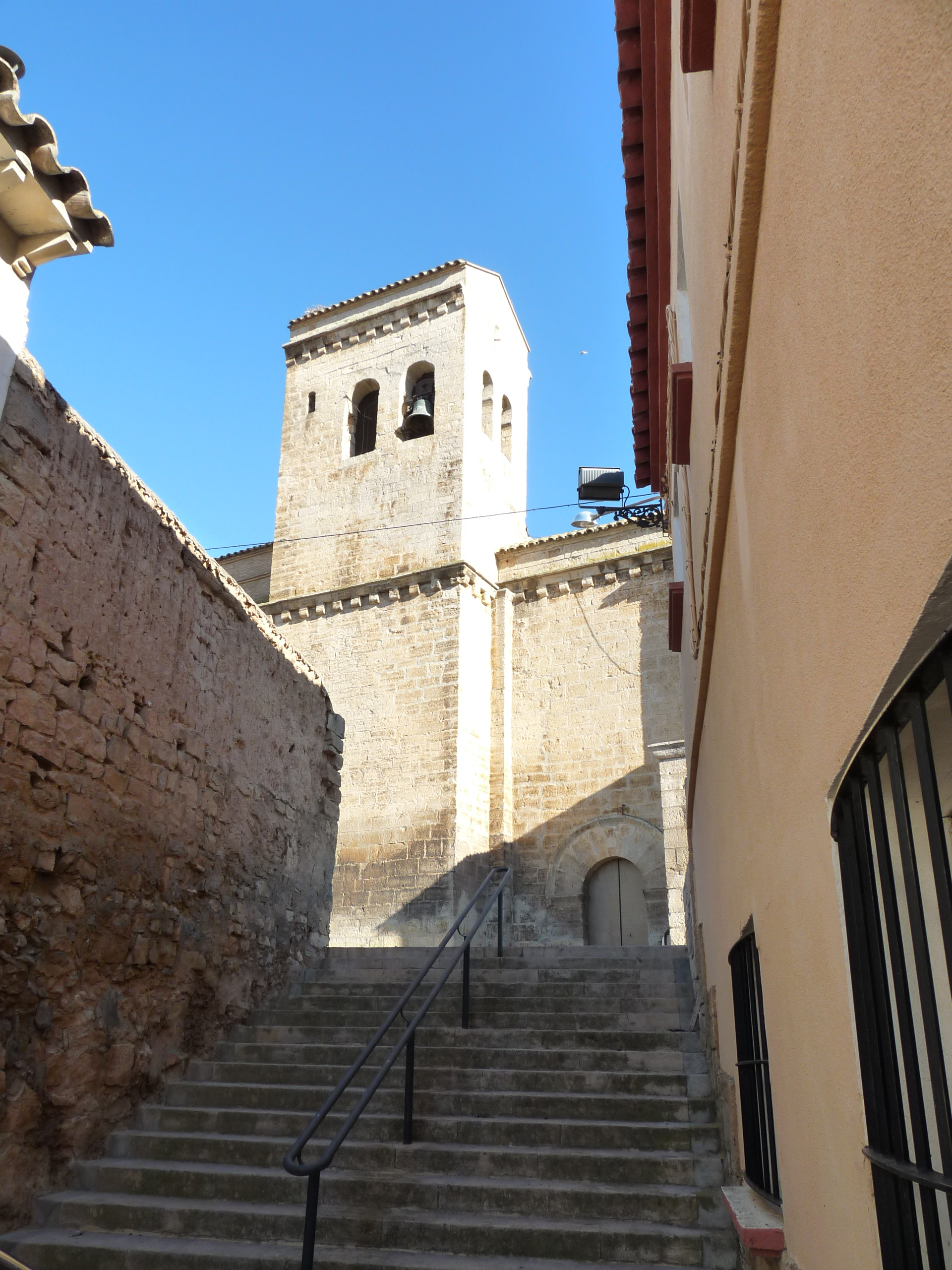
- Church of Staint Mary (romanesque, 13th c.)

- Flag Coat of arms
- Interactive map of Ontiñena
- Country: Spain
- Autonomous community: Aragon
- Province: Huesca
- Municipality: Ontiñena/Ontinyena

Area
  - Total: 137 km^{2} (53 sq mi)

Population (2025-01-01)
  - Total: 502
  - Density: 3.66/km^{2} (9.49/sq mi)
- Time zone: UTC+1 (CET)
  - Summer (DST): UTC+2 (CEST)

Ontiñena (Spanish: [ontiˈɲena]) is a municipality located in the province of Huesca, Aragon, Spain. According to the 2004 census (INE), the municipality has a population of 623 inhabitants.

== See also ==
- List of municipalities in Huesca
