= San Tirso SD =

San Tirso
- Full name: San Tirso Sociedad Deportiva
- Founded: 1940; 86 years ago
- Stadium: Campo Municipal do Monte
- Capacity: 1,000
- President: Carlos Fernández
- Head coach: Fabio Rodríguez
- League: Preferente Futgal – Group 1
- 2025–26: Preferente Futgal – Group 1, 4th of 18
- Website: santirsosd.com
Home colours	Away colours

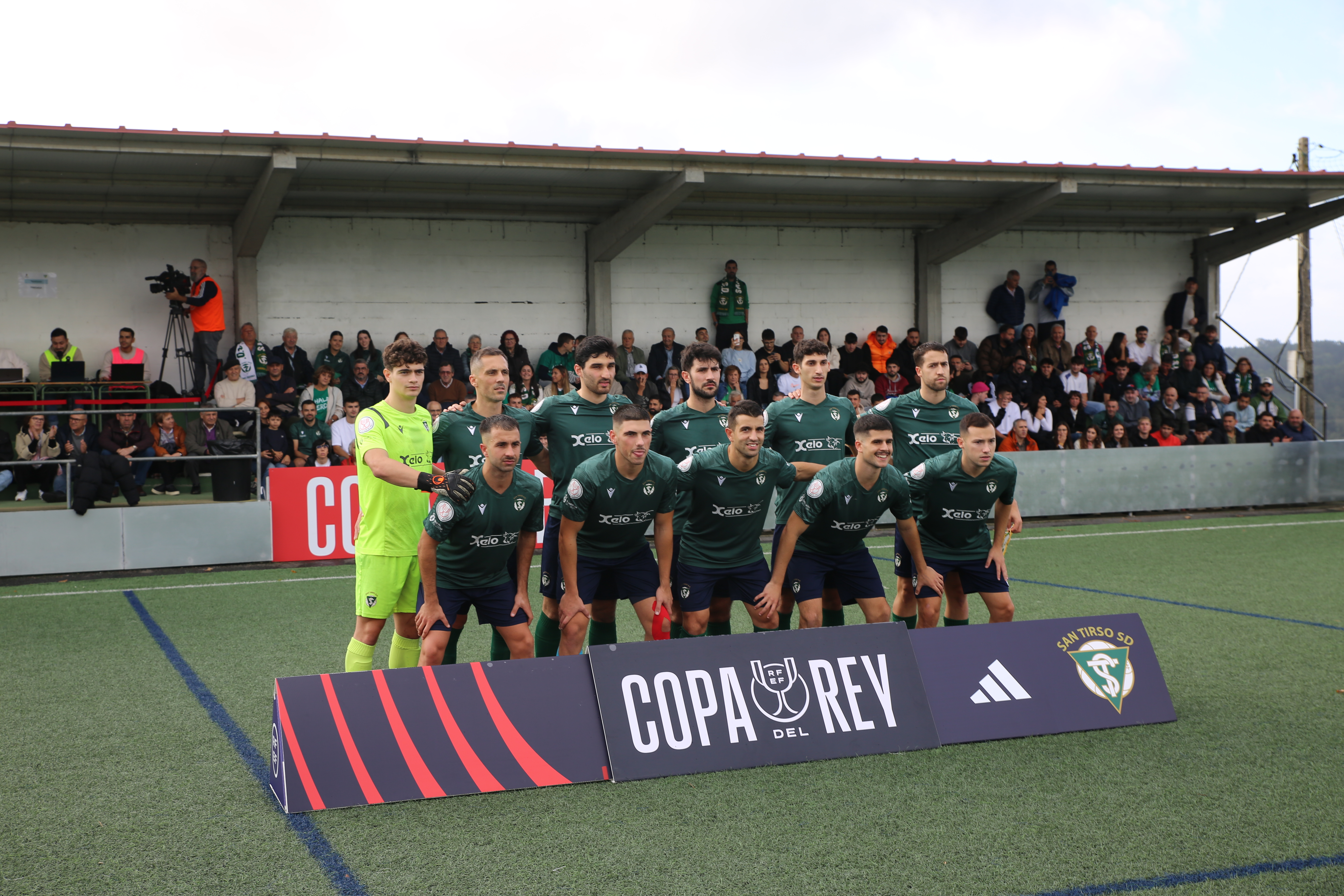
San Tirso SD, 2024-25.

San Tirso Sociedad Deportiva is a Spanish football club based in Mabegondo, Abegondo, in the autonomous community of Galicia. Founded in 1940, they currently play in Preferente Futgal – Group 1, holding home matches at the Campo Municipal do Monte.

San Tirso also have a 20-year affiliation agreement with Deportivo de La Coruña since 2017, with the Cadete B and Infantil B players of Dépor being assigned to San Tirso.

== Season to season ==
Season	Tier	Division	Place	Copa del Rey
1940–1971	—	Regional		
1971–72	6	2ª Reg.	4th	
1972–73	6	2ª Reg.	4th	
1973–74	5	2ª Reg.	3rd	
1974–75	6	3ª Reg.	1st	
1975–76	5	2ª Reg.	6th	
1976–77	5	2ª Reg.	4th	
1977–78	6	1ª Reg.	2nd	
1978–79	6	1ª Reg.	7th	
1979–80	6	1ª Reg.	9th	
1980–81	6	1ª Reg.	7th	
1981–82	5	Reg. Pref.	9th	
1982–83	5	Reg. Pref.	7th	
1983–84	5	Reg. Pref.	19th	
1984–85	6	1ª Reg.	17th	
1985–86	6	1ª Reg.	10th	
1986–87	6	1ª Reg.	13th	
1987–88	6	1ª Reg.	5th	
1988–89	6	1ª Reg.	12th	
1989–90	6	1ª Reg.	2nd	

Season	Tier	Division	Place	Copa del Rey
1990–91	6	1ª Reg.	6th	
1991–92	7	2ª Reg.	9th	
1992–93	7	2ª Reg.	5th	
1993–94	7	2ª Reg.	3rd	
1994–95	7	2ª Reg.	15th	
1995–96	8	3ª Reg.	5th	
1996–97	8	3ª Reg.	1st	
1997–98	8	3ª Reg.	2nd	
1998–99	8	3ª Reg.	1st	
1999–2000	7	2ª Reg.	12th	
2000–01	7	2ª Reg.	17th	
2001–02	8	3ª Reg.	3rd	
2002–03	8	3ª Reg.	4th	
2003–04	8	3ª Reg.	2nd	
2004–05	8	3ª Reg.	1st	
2005–06	7	2ª Reg.	1st	
2006–07	6	1ª Aut.	11th	
2007–08	6	1ª Aut.	8th	
2008–09	6	1ª Aut.	5th	
2009–10	6	1ª Aut.	12th	

Season	Tier	Division	Place	Copa del Rey
2010–11	6	1ª Aut.	15th	
2011–12	7	2ª Aut.	2nd	
2012–13	6	1ª Aut.	1st	
2013–14	5	Pref. Aut.	16th	
2014–15	6	1ª Aut.	2nd	
2015–16	6	1ª Aut.	9th	
2016–17	6	1ª Gal.	2nd	
2017–18	5	Pref.	12th	
2018–19	5	Pref.	12th	
2019–20	5	Pref.	12th	
2020–21	5	Pref.	5th	
2021–22	6	Pref.	6th	
2022–23	6	Pref.	5th	
2023–24	6	Pref.	4th	
2024–25	6	Pref. Futgal	4th	First round
2025–26	6	Pref. Futgal		
