= 2016 Tercera División play-offs =

In Spanish football

The 2016 Tercera División play-offs to Segunda División B from Tercera División (Promotion play-offs) were the final playoffs for the promotion from 2015–16 Tercera División to 2016–17 Segunda División B. The first four teams in each group took part in the play-off.

== Format ==
The eighteen group winners have the opportunity to be promoted directly to Segunda División B. The eighteen group winners were drawn into a two-legged series where the nine winners will promote to Segunda División B. The nine losing clubs will enter the play-off round for the last nine promotion spots.

The eighteen runners-up were drawn against one of the eighteen fourth-placed clubs outside their group and the eighteen third-placed clubs were drawn against one another in a two-legged series. The twenty-seven winners will advance with the nine losing clubs from the champions' series to determine the eighteen teams that will enter the last two-legged series for the last nine promotion spots. In all the playoff series, the lower-ranked club play at home first. Whenever there is a tie in position (e.g. like the group winners in the champions' series or the third-placed teams in the first round), a draw determines the club to play at home first.

== Group Winners promotion play-off ==
=== Qualified teams ===
The draw took place in the RFEF headquarters, in Las Rozas (Madrid) on 16 May 2016.

Group	Team
1	Boiro
2	Caudal
3	Laredo
4	Zamudio
5	Prat
6	Atlético Saguntino
7	San Sebastián de los Reyes
8	Zamora
9	Atlético Mancha Real

Group	Team
10	Córdoba B
11	Mallorca B
12	Villa de Santa Brígida
13	Lorca Deportiva
14	Extremadura
15	Osasuna B
16	Calahorra
17	Deportivo Aragón
18	Conquense

=== Matches ===
Team 1	Agg.	Team 2	1st leg	2nd leg
Atlético Mancha Real	5–1	Zamora	3–1	2–0
Conquense	0–2	Extremadura	0–0	0–2
Boiro	2–1	Caudal	2–0	0–1
Deportivo Aragón	0–2	Mallorca B	0–0	0–2
Villa de Santa Brígida	2–3	San Sebastián de los Reyes	1–0	1–3
Atlético Saguntino	2–2 (2–0 p)	Calahorra	2–0	0–2
Zamudio	3–2	Laredo	3–1	0–1
Córdoba B	4–2	Lorca Deportiva	1–2	3–0
Prat	3–2	Osasuna B	3–1	0–1

Promoted to Segunda División B
Atlético Mancha Real (First time ever)	Atlético Saguntino (First time ever)	Boiro (First time ever)	Extremadura (5 years later)	Mallorca B (One year later)	Prat (2 years later)	San Sebastián de los Reyes (3 years later)	Zamudio (19 years later)	Córdoba B (One year later)

== Non-champions promotion play-off ==
=== First round ===
==== Qualified teams ====
Group	Pos.	Team
1	2nd	Cerceda
2	2nd	Langreo
3	2nd	Gimnástica Torrelavega
4	2nd	Bermeo
5	2nd	Gavà
6	2nd	Ontinyent
7	2nd	Navalcarnero
8	2nd	Gimnástica Segoviana
9	2nd	Atlético Malagueño
10	2nd	Atlético Sanluqueño
11	2nd	Formentera
12	2nd	Lanzarote
13	2nd	Águilas
14	2nd	Badajoz
15	2nd	Atlético Cirbonero
16	2nd	SD Logroñés
17	2nd	Andorra
18	2nd	Almagro

Group	Pos.	Team
1	3rd	Deportivo La Coruña B
2	3rd	Avilés
3	3rd	Racing Santander B
4	3rd	Lagun Onak
5	3rd	Europa
6	3rd	Castellón
7	3rd	Pozuelo de Alarcón
8	3rd	Palencia
9	3rd	Loja
10	3rd	San Fernando
11	3rd	Peña Deportiva
12	3rd	Las Palmas Atlético
13	3rd	El Palmar Estrella Grana
14	3rd	Arroyo
15	3rd	San Juan
16	3rd	Haro
17	3rd	Tarazona
18	3rd	Azuqueca

Group	Pos.	Team
1	4th	Choco
2	4th	Marino Luanco
3	4th	Cayón
4	4th	Balmaseda
5	4th	Vilafranca
6	4th	Elche Ilicitano
7	4th	Atlético Madrid B
8	4th	Villaralbo
9	4th	El Ejido
10	4th	Alcalá
11	4th	Constància
12	4th	Tenisca
13	4th	Mar Menor
14	4th	Jerez
15	4th	Mutilvera
16	4th	Náxara
17	4th	Teruel
18	4th	Almansa

=== Matches ===
The draw took place in the RFEF headquarters, in Las Rozas (Madrid), on 16 May 2016. The first leg was played on 22 and 23 May 2016 and the second one on 28 and 29 May.

Team 1	Agg.	Team 2	1st leg	2nd leg
Tenisca	2–3	Navalcarnero	2–1	0–2
Atlético Madrid B	0–2	Almagro	0–2	0–0
Elche Ilicitano	3–1	Lanzarote	2–0	1–1
Teruel	0–3	Ontinyent	0–2	0–1
Villaralbo	2–3	Cerceda	1–1	1–2
Choco	4–3	Badajoz	2–1	2–2
Constància	2–3	SD Logroñés	1–2	1–1
El Ejido	5–3	Bermeo	3–0	2–3
Balmaseda	2–3	Águilas	1–1	1–2
Mutilvera	2–1	Gimnástica Torrelavega	2–0	0–1
Marino Luanco	3–4	Gavà	1–1	2–3
Cayón	4–1	Atlético Cirbonero	2–1	2–0
Alcalá	2–3	Langreo	2–1	0–2
Vilafranca	0–2	Atlético Malagueño	0–0	0–2
Jerez	1–0	Gimnástica Segoviana	1–1	1–0
Mar Menor	2–1	Formentera	0–1	2–0
Náxara	0–1	Atlético Sanluqueño	0–0	0–1
Almansa	0–0 (4–3 p)	Andorra	0–0	0–0
Deportivo La Coruña B	5–1	El Palmar Estrella Grana	4–0	1–1
Azuqueca	2–2 (a)	Arroyo	1–0	1–2
Palencia	4–2	Loja	1–2	3–0
Haro	2–0	Pozuelo de Alarcón	0–0	2–0
San Juan	0–1	Tarazona	0–0	0–1
San Fernando	4–3	Europa	1–1	3–2
Lagun Onak	1–1 (8–7 p)	Avilés	1–0	0–1
Castellón	2–0	Peña Deportiva	1–0	1–0
Las Palmas Atlético	2–0	Racing Santander B	1–0	1–0

=== Second round ===
==== Qualified teams ====
The draw was held in the RFEF headquarters, in Las Rozas (Madrid).

Group	Position	Team
2	1st	Caudal
3	1st	Laredo
8	1st	Zamora
12	1st	Villa de Santa Brígida
13	1st	Lorca Deportiva
15	1st	Osasuna B
16	1st	Calahorra
17	1st	Deportivo Aragón
18	1st	Conquense

Group	Position	Team
1	2nd	Cerceda
2	2nd	Langreo
5	2nd	Gavà
6	2nd	Ontinyent
7	2nd	Navalcarnero
9	2nd	Atlético Malagueño
10	2nd	Atlético Sanluqueño
13	2nd	Águilas
16	2nd	SD Logroñés
18	2nd	Almagro

Group	Position	Team
1	3rd	Deportivo La Coruña B
4	3rd	Lagun Onak
6	3rd	Castellón
8	3rd	Palencia
10	3rd	San Fernando
12	3rd	Las Palmas Atlético
16	3rd	Haro
17	3rd	Tarazona
18	3rd	Azuqueca

Group	Position	Team
1	4th	Choco
3	4th	Cayón
6	4th	Elche Ilicitano
9	4th	El Ejido
13	4th	Mar Menor
14	4th	Jerez
15	4th	Mutilvera
18	4th	Almansa

=== Matches ===
The draw took place in the RFEF headquarters, in Las Rozas (Madrid), on 30 May 2016. The first leg will be played on 4 and 5 June 2016 and the second one on 11 and 12 June.

Team 1	Agg.	Team 2	1st leg	2nd leg
Mutilvera	5–1	Zamora	3–1	2–0
Mar Menor	0–1	Osasuna B	0–0	0–1
El Ejido	3–2	Lorca Deportiva	1–1	2–1
Choco	1–4	Deportivo Aragón	1–2	0–2
Jerez	2–5	Conquense	2–3	0–2
Elche Ilicitano	3–2	Villa de Santa Brígida	3–0	0–2
Cayón	0–3	Caudal	0–2	0–1
Almansa	1–2	Laredo	0–1	1–1
San Fernando	3–2	Calahorra	2–1	1–1
Las Palmas Atlético	3–3 (a)	Atlético Sanluqueño	3–1	0–2
Castellón	2–1	Atlético Malagueño	2–1	0–0
Deportivo La Coruña B	2–2 (a)	Navalcarnero	2–1	0–1
Azuqueca	1–3	Cerceda	1–1	0–2
Tarazona	3–3 (a)	Ontinyent	1–0	2–3
Haro	3–3 (a, aet)	Langreo	1–1	2–2
Lagun Onak	1–2	Águilas	1–0	0–2
Palencia	3–2	SD Logroñés	0–1	3–1
Gavà	4–0	Almagro	3–0	1–0

=== Third round ===
==== Qualified teams ====
Group	Pos.	Team
2	1st	Caudal
3	1st	Laredo
15	1st	Osasuna B
17	1st	Deportivo Aragón
18	1st	Conquense

Group	Pos.	Team
1	2nd	Cerceda
5	2nd	Gavà
7	2nd	Navalcarnero
10	2nd	Atlético Sanluqueño
13	2nd	Águilas

Group	Pos.	Team
6	3rd	Castellón
8	3rd	Palencia
10	3rd	San Fernando
16	3rd	Haro
17	3rd	Tarazona

Group	Pos.	Team
6	4th	Elche Ilicitano
9	4th	El Ejido
15	4th	Mutilvera

=== Matches ===
The draw took place in the RFEF headquarters, in Las Rozas (Madrid), on 13 June 2016. The first leg will be played on 18 and 19 June 2016 and the second one on 25 and 26 June.

Team 1	Agg.	Team 2	1st leg	2nd leg
El Ejido	1–0	Laredo	1–0	0–0
Mutilvera	1–1 (a)	Conquense	0–0	1–1
Elche Ilicitano	4–5	Osasuna B	2–1	2-4
Haro	0–3	Caudal	0–2	0–1
Palencia	2–0	Deportivo Aragón	1–0	1–0
Tarazona	2–4	Navalcarnero	2–2	0–2
San Fernando	4–2	Águilas	3–1	1–1
Castellón	4–4 (5–6 p)	Gavà	2–2	2–2
Atlético Sanluqueño	2–0	Cerceda	0–0	2–0

Promoted to Segunda División B
Atlético Sanluqueño (2 years later)	Caudal (2 years later)	El Ejido (First time ever)	Gavà (6 years later)	Mutilvera (First time ever)	Navalcarnero (7 years later)	Osasuna B (3 years later)	Palencia (First time ever)	San Fernando (2 years later)

== See also ==
- 2016 Segunda División play-offs
- 2016 Segunda División B play-offs
