= 2015–16 Tercera División =

Tercera División
- Season: 2015–16
- Top goalscorer: Rubén Pérez (34 goals)
- Biggest home win: El Palmar 10–0 Caravaca (8 May 2016)
- Biggest away win: Collado Villalba 1–12 Navalcarnero (10 January 2016)
- Highest scoring: Collado Villalba 1–12 Navalcarnero (10 January 2016)

The 2015–16 Tercera División was the fourth tier in Spanish football. It started in August 2015 and ended in late June 2016 with the promotion play-off finals.

== Competition format ==
- The top four eligible teams in each group will play the promotion playoffs.
- The champion of each group will qualify to 2016–17 Copa del Rey. If the champion is a reserve team, the first non-reserve team qualified will join the Copa.
- In each group, at least three teams will be relegated to Regional Divisions.

== Group 1 – Galicia ==
=== Teams ===
Location of teams of the 2015–16 Tercera División Group 1

Team	City	Home ground
Alondras	Cangas	O Morrazo
Arosa	Vilagarcía de Arousa	A Lomba
As Pontes	As Pontes de García Rodríguez	O Poboado
Barbadás	Barbadás	Os Carrís
Barco	O Barco de Valdeorras	Calabagueiros
Bergantiños	Carballo	As Eiroas
Boiro	Boiro	Barraña
Cerceda	Cerceda	O Roxo
Choco	Redondela	Santa Mariña
Deportivo B	A Coruña	Abegondo
Galicia Mugardos	Mugardos	A Pedreira
Negreira	Negreira	Jesús García Calvo
Noia	Noia	San Lázaro
Órdenes	Ordes	Vista Alegre
Racing Villalbés	Vilalba	A Magdalena
Rápido de Bouzas	Bouzas, Vigo	Baltasar Pujales
Ribadeo	Ribadeo	Pepe Barrera
Ribadumia	Ribadumia	A Senra
Silva	A Coruña	A Grela
Verín	Verín	Xosé Argiz

=== League table ===
Pos	Team	Pld	W	D	L	GF	GA	GD	Pts	Qualification or relegation
1	Boiro (P)	38	22	11	5	71	33	+38	77	Qualification to group champions' playoffs
2	Cerceda	38	22	6	10	64	40	+24	72	Qualification to promotion playoffs
3	Deportivo B	38	19	10	9	74	46	+28	67	Qualification to promotion playoffs
4	Choco	38	17	12	9	57	40	+17	63	Qualification to promotion playoffs
5	Racing Villalbés	38	15	13	10	51	43	+8	58	
6	Barco	38	15	12	11	55	54	+1	57	
7	Alondras	38	14	14	10	44	41	+3	56	
8	Rápido de Bouzas	38	15	10	13	51	46	+5	55	
9	Arosa	38	13	15	10	55	48	+7	54	
10	As Pontes	38	13	10	15	49	54	−5	49	
11	Ribadumia	38	13	9	16	54	51	+3	48	
12	Negreira	38	11	15	12	47	48	−1	48	
13	Silva	38	12	12	14	53	56	−3	48	
14	Barbadás	38	11	12	15	47	58	−11	45	
15	Órdenes	38	12	9	17	33	45	−12	45	
16	Bergantiños	38	11	10	17	38	43	−5	43	
17	Galicia Mugardos (R)	38	10	13	15	48	63	−15	43	Relegation to Preferente Autonómica
18	Ribadeo (R)	38	8	11	19	41	68	−27	35	Relegation to Preferente Autonómica
19	Noia (R)	38	8	8	22	28	59	−31	32	Relegation to Preferente Autonómica
20	Verín (R)	38	5	16	17	30	54	−24	31	Relegation to Preferente Autonómica

Updated to match(es) played on 15 May 2016. Source:
Rules for classification: 1) points; 2) head-to-head points; 3) head-to-head goal difference; 4) goal difference; 5) number of goals scored; 6) fair-play points; 7) playoff match
(P) Promoted; (R) Relegated

Top goalscorers

Goalscorers	Goals	Team
(Spain) Changui	24	Ribadumia
(Spain) Rubén Rivera	20	Boiro
(Spain) Hugo Sanmartín	20	Choco
(Spain) Pinchi	19	Deportivo B
(Spain) Diego Silva	18	Choco

Top goalkeeper

Goalkeeper	Goals	Matches	Average	Team
(Spain) Enrique Reguero	30	34	0.88	Boiro

== Group 2 – Asturias ==
=== Teams ===
Location of confirmed teams in the 2015–16 Tercera División Group 2
Teams in Oviedo: Astur, Covadonga, Oviedo B

Team	City	Home ground
Astur	Oviedo	Hermanos Llana
Atlético Lugones	Lugones, Siero	Santa Bárbara
Avilés	Avilés	Román Suárez Puerta
Caudal	Mieres	Hermanos Antuña
Ceares	Gijón	La Cruz
Colunga	Colunga	Santianes
Condal	Noreña	Alejandro Ortea
Covadonga	Oviedo	Juan Antonio Álvarez Rabanal
Gijón Industrial	Gijón	El Frontón
Langreo	La Felguera, Langreo	Ganzábal
Llanes	Llanes	San José
Marino Luanco	Luanco, Gozón	Miramar
Mosconia	Grado	Marqués de la Vega de Anzo
Oviedo B	Oviedo	El Requexón
Praviano	Pravia	Santa Catalina
Roces	Gijón	Covadonga
Siero	Pola de Siero, Siero	El Bayu
Tineo	Tineo	San Roque
Tuilla	Tuilla, Langreo	El Candín
Urraca	Posada, Llanes	La Corredoria

=== League table ===
Pos	Team	Pld	W	D	L	GF	GA	GD	Pts	Qualification or relegation
1	Caudal (P)	38	31	5	2	86	12	+74	98	Qualification to group champions' playoffs
2	Langreo	38	28	6	4	96	25	+71	90	Qualification to promotion playoffs
3	Avilés	38	28	5	5	77	18	+59	89	Qualification to promotion playoffs
4	Marino Luanco	38	20	8	10	55	23	+32	68	Qualification to promotion playoffs
5	Tuilla	38	19	10	9	66	39	+27	67	
6	Colunga	38	21	3	14	60	54	+6	66	
7	Oviedo B	38	18	8	12	63	42	+21	62	
8	Condal	38	17	9	12	50	47	+3	60	
9	Llanes	38	16	9	13	54	47	+7	57	
10	Ceares	38	13	6	19	42	60	−18	45	
11	Covadonga	38	13	6	19	35	51	−16	45	
12	Atlético Lugones	38	9	14	15	33	55	−22	41	
13	Mosconia	38	11	7	20	36	57	−21	40	
14	Praviano	38	10	10	18	39	65	−26	40	
15	Tineo	38	10	9	19	40	63	−23	39	
16	Siero	38	10	8	20	37	63	−26	38	
17	Urraca	38	8	12	18	34	47	−13	36	
18	Gijón Industrial (R)	38	6	13	19	34	68	−34	31	Relegation to Regional Preferente
19	Astur (R)	38	6	6	26	34	92	−58	24	Relegation to Regional Preferente
20	Roces (R)	38	4	10	24	19	62	−43	22	Relegation to Regional Preferente

Updated to match(es) played on 15 May 2016. Source: Futbolme
Rules for classification: 1) points; 2) head-to-head points; 3) head-to-head goal difference; 4) goal difference; 5) number of goals scored; 6) fair-play points; 7) playoff match
(P) Promoted; (R) Relegated

Top goalscorers

Goalscorers	Goals	Team
(Spain) Claudio Medina	28	Langreo
(Spain) Jorge Rodríguez	26	Avilés
(Spain) Luis Nuño	20	Langreo
(Spain) Marcos Iglesias	20	Ceares
(Spain) Javi Sánchez	18	Caudal

Top goalkeeper

Goalkeeper	Goals	Matches	Average	Team
(Germany) Björn Bussmann	9	29	0.31	Caudal

== Group 3 – Cantabria ==
=== Teams ===
Location of teams of the 2015–16 Tercera División Group III
Teams in Santander: Rayo Cantabria, Racing Santander B, Atlético Albericia
Teams in Torrelavega: Gimnástica Torrelavega, Tropezón

Team	City	Home ground
Atlético Albericia	Santander	Juan Hormaechea
Bezana	Santa Cruz de Bezana	Municipal
Castro	Castro Urdiales	Mioño
Cayón	Sarón, Santa María de Cayón	Fernando Astobiza
Colindres	Colindres	El Carmen
Escobedo	Escobedo, Camargo	Eusebio Arce
Gama	Bárcena de Cicero	Santa María
Gimnástica Torrelavega	Torrelavega	El Malecón
Guarnizo	Guarnizo, El Astillero	El Pilar
Laredo	Laredo	San Lorenzo
Naval	Reinosa	San Francisco
Racing Santander B	Santander	La Albericia
Rayo Cantabria	Santander	Mies de Cozada
Revilla	Camargo	El Crucero
Sámano	Sámano, Castro Urdiales	Vallegón
Selaya	Selaya	El Castañal
Siete Villas	Castillo, Arnuero	San Pedro
Textil Escudo	Cabezón de la Sal	Municipal
Tropezón	Torrelavega	Santa Ana
Vimenor	Vioño de Piélagos, Piélagos	La Vidriera

=== League table ===
Pos	Team	Pld	W	D	L	GF	GA	GD	Pts	Qualification or relegation
1	Laredo	38	27	7	4	74	29	+45	88	Qualification to group champions' playoffs
2	Gimnástica Torrelavega	38	28	3	7	87	28	+59	87	Qualification to promotion playoffs
3	Racing Santander B	38	26	8	4	90	35	+55	86	Qualification to promotion playoffs
4	Cayón	38	24	7	7	66	27	+39	79	Qualification to promotion playoffs
5	Rayo Cantabria	38	18	7	13	60	50	+10	61	
6	Castro	38	14	15	9	46	34	+12	57	
7	Vimenor	38	15	10	13	54	46	+8	55	
8	Escobedo	38	14	8	16	57	53	+4	50	
9	Tropezón	38	14	8	16	51	44	+7	50	
10	Textil Escudo	38	12	10	16	62	58	+4	46	
11	Guarnizo	38	12	7	19	44	55	−11	43	
12	Colindres	38	11	10	17	45	68	−23	43	
13	Siete Villas	38	10	12	16	44	57	−13	42	
14	Revilla	38	10	11	17	34	47	−13	41	
15	Bezana	38	10	10	18	36	59	−23	40	
16	Atlético Albericia	38	10	9	19	38	60	−22	39	
17	Selaya	38	7	18	13	41	60	−19	39	
18	Naval (R)	38	9	9	20	29	60	−31	36	Relegation to Regional Preferente
19	Gama (R)	38	9	7	22	34	82	−48	34	Relegation to Regional Preferente
20	Sámano (R)	38	6	12	20	32	72	−40	30	Relegation to Regional Preferente

Updated to match(es) played on 15 May 2016. Source:
Rules for classification: 1) points; 2) head-to-head points; 3) head-to-head goal difference; 4) goal difference; 5) number of goals scored; 6) fair-play points; 7) playoff match
(R) Relegated

Top goalscorers

Goalscorers	Goals	Team
(Spain) Primo	25	Gimnástica
(Spain) Soma	17	Racing Santander B
(Spain) Roberto Platero	17	Rayo Cantabria
(Spain) Alberto Dorronsoro	16	Gimnástica
(Spain) Chema Torrontegui	16	Selaya

Top goalkeeper

Goalkeeper	Goals	Matches	Average	Team
(Spain) Rubén Lavín	25	36	0.69	Cayón

== Group 4 – Basque Country ==
=== Teams ===
Location of teams of the 2015–16 Tercera División Group IV
Teams in Bilbao: Deusto, Santutxu
Teams in Vitoria: Alavés B, Aurrerá Vitoria, Elgorriaga, Vitoria

Team	City	Home ground
Alavés B	Vitoria	Ibaia
Aretxabaleta	Aretxabaleta	Ibarra
Aurrera Ondarroa	Ondarroa	Zaldupe
Aurrerá Vitoria	Vitoria	Olaranbe
Balmaseda	Balmaseda	La Baluga
Basconia	Basauri	López Cortázar
Beasain	Beasain	Loinaz
Berio	San Sebastián	Berio
Bermeo	Bermeo	Itxas Gane
Deusto	Bilbao	Etxezuri
Durango	Durango	Tabira
Elgorriaga	Vitoria	Betoño
Getxo	Getxo	Fadura
Lagun Onak	Azpeitia	Garmendipe
Pasaia	Pasaia	Don Bosco
Santurtzi	Santurtzi	San Jorge
Santutxu	Bilbao	Maiona
Vitoria	Nanclares de la Oca	Arrate
Zalla	Zalla	Landaberri
Zamudio	Zamudio	Gazituaga

=== League table ===
Pos	Team	Pld	W	D	L	GF	GA	GD	Pts	Qualification or relegation
1	Zamudio (P)	38	22	8	8	65	40	+25	74	Qualification to group champions' playoffs
2	Bermeo	38	19	10	9	57	35	+22	67	Qualification to promotion playoffs
3	Lagun Onak	38	17	15	6	39	26	+13	66	Qualification to promotion playoffs
4	Balmaseda	38	18	10	10	50	35	+15	64	Qualification to promotion playoffs
5	Beasain	38	17	12	9	54	36	+18	63	
6	Vitoria	38	17	10	11	47	32	+15	61	
7	Santutxu	38	14	11	13	39	33	+6	53	
8	Zalla	38	13	13	12	54	43	+11	52	
9	Pasaia	38	15	7	16	36	48	−12	52	
10	Durango	38	11	17	10	29	34	−5	50	
11	Getxo	38	13	11	14	43	38	+5	50	
12	Alavés B	38	13	9	16	54	52	+2	48	
13	Berio	38	12	11	15	45	48	−3	47	
14	Basconia	38	13	7	18	53	62	−9	46	
15	Santurtzi	38	10	16	12	40	46	−6	46	
16	Deusto	38	10	15	13	38	46	−8	45	
17	Aurrerá Ondarroa	38	11	8	19	50	76	−26	41	
18	Aurrerá Vitoria (R)	38	9	13	16	33	50	−17	40	Relegation to Regional leagues
19	Elgorriaga (R)	38	7	11	20	36	56	−20	32	Relegation to Regional leagues
20	Aretxabaleta (R)	38	4	16	18	34	60	−26	28	Relegation to Regional leagues

Updated to match(es) played on 14 May 2016. Source:
Rules for classification: 1) points; 2) head-to-head points; 3) head-to-head goal difference; 4) goal difference; 5) number of goals scored; 6) fair-play points; 7) playoff match
(P) Promoted; (R) Relegated

Top goalscorers

Goalscorers	Goals	Team
(Spain) Cristian Bonilla	21	Santurtzi
(Spain) Iker Amorrortu	19	Bermeo
(Spain) Asier Benito	19	Alavés B
(Spain) Koldo Obieta	17	Zamudio
(Spain) Paul Abasolo	14	Zamudio

Top goalkeeper

Goalkeeper	Goals	Matches	Average	Team
(Spain) Markel Areitio	30	32	0.94	Durango

== Group 5 – Catalonia ==
=== Teams ===
Location of teams of the 2015–16 Tercera División Group 5
Teams in Barcelona: Europa, Júpiter, Montañesa, Sant Andreu

Team	City	Home ground
Ascó	Ascó	Municipal
Cerdanyola del Vallès	Cerdanyola del Vallès	La Bòbila-Pinetons
Europa	Barcelona	Nou Sardenya
Figueres	Figueres	Vilatenim
Gavà	Gavà	La Bòbila
Granollers	Granollers	Carrer Girona
Júpiter	Barcelona	La Verneda
Manlleu	Manlleu	Municipal
Masnou	El Masnou	Municipal
Montañesa	Barcelona	Nou Barris
Morell	El Morell	Municipal
Palamós	Palamós	Palamós Costa Brava
Peralada	Peralada	Municipal
Prat	El Prat de Llobregat	Sagnier
Rubí	Rubí	Can Rosés
Sabadell B	Sabadell	Pepín Valls
Sant Andreu	Barcelona	Narcís Sala
Santfeliuenc	Sant Feliu de Llobregat	Les Grases
Terrassa	Terrassa	Olímpic de Terrassa
Vilafranca	Vilafranca del Penedès	Municipal

=== League table ===
Pos	Team	Pld	W	D	L	GF	GA	GD	Pts	Qualification or relegation
1	Prat (P)	38	20	16	2	62	26	+36	76	Qualification to group champions' playoffs
2	Gavà (P)	38	18	16	4	69	38	+31	70	Qualification to promotion playoffs
3	Europa	38	18	14	6	60	33	+27	68	Qualification to promotion playoffs
4	Vilafranca	38	20	6	12	68	55	+13	66	Qualification to promotion playoffs
5	Montañesa	38	19	8	11	52	35	+17	65	
6	Sabadell B	38	17	11	10	57	41	+16	62	
7	Sant Andreu	38	15	10	13	54	46	+8	55	
8	Cerdanyola del Vallès	38	15	9	14	52	50	+2	54	
9	Júpiter	38	15	6	17	60	68	−8	51	
10	Figueres	38	14	9	15	48	40	+8	51	
11	Ascó	38	12	13	13	35	43	−8	49	
12	Palamós	38	11	15	12	54	54	0	48	
13	Terrassa	38	14	6	18	43	61	−18	48	
14	Peralada	38	11	14	13	50	54	−4	47	
15	Manlleu	38	14	5	19	44	58	−14	47	
16	Santfeliuenc	38	11	12	15	47	55	−8	45	
17	Granollers	38	12	8	18	52	63	−11	44	
18	Rubí (R)	38	10	9	19	38	57	−19	39	Relegation to Primera Catalana
19	Morell (R)	38	7	7	24	29	70	−41	28	Relegation to Primera Catalana
20	Masnou (R)	38	6	8	24	40	67	−27	26	Relegation to Primera Catalana

Updated to match(es) played on 15 May 2016. Source:
Rules for classification: 1) points; 2) head-to-head points; 3) head-to-head goal difference; 4) goal difference; 5) number of goals scored; 6) fair-play points; 7) playoff match
(P) Promoted; (R) Relegated

Top goalscorers

Goalscorers	Goals	Team
(Spain) Santi Triguero	21	Vilafranca
(Spain) Marc Mas	21	Peralada
(Spain) Víctor Oribe	17	Vilafranca
(Spain) Kuku Kanteh	17	Júpiter
(Spain) David Toro	17	Santfeliuenc

Top goalkeeper

Goalkeeper	Goals	Matches	Average	Team
(Spain) Toni Texeira	23	36	0.64	Prat

== Group 6 – Valencian Community ==
=== Teams ===
Location of teams of the 2015–16 Tercera División Group 6

Team	City	Home ground
Acero	Sagunto	El Fornàs
Alzira	Alzira	Luis Suñer Picó
Atlético Saguntino	Sagunto	Morvedre
Benigànim	Benigànim	Municipal
Buñol	Buñol	Beltrán Báguena
Castellón	Castelló de la Plana	Castalia
Crevillente	Crevillent	Enrique Miralles
Borriol	Borriol	El Palmar
Elche Ilicitano	Elche	José Díaz Iborra
Jove Español	San Vicente del Raspeig	Ciudad Deportiva
Muro	Muro de Alcoy	La Llometa
Novelda	Novelda	La Magdalena
Ontinyent	Ontinyent	El Clariano
Orihuela	Orihuela	Los Arcos
Paterna	Paterna	Gerardo Salvador
Rayo Ibense	Ibi	Francisco Vilaplana Mariel
Recambios Colón	Catarroja	Sedaví
Torre Levante	Valencia	Municipal
Torrevieja	Torrevieja	Vicente García
Villarreal C	Villarreal	Ciudad Deportiva

=== League table ===
Pos	Team	Pld	W	D	L	GF	GA	GD	Pts	Qualification or relegation
1	Atlético Saguntino (P)	38	25	7	6	62	25	+37	82	Qualification to group champions' playoffs
2	Ontinyent	38	22	5	11	62	39	+23	71	Qualification to promotion playoffs
3	Castellón	38	20	10	8	60	41	+19	70	Qualification to promotion playoffs
4	Elche Ilicitano	38	20	9	9	64	39	+25	69	Qualification to promotion playoffs
5	Villarreal C	38	15	16	7	64	43	+21	61	
6	Alzira	38	18	6	14	57	50	+7	60	
7	Novelda	38	16	10	12	51	39	+12	58	
8	Orihuela	38	16	8	14	50	46	+4	56	
9	Torre Levante	38	14	13	11	43	35	+8	55	
10	Rayo Ibense	38	15	9	14	38	40	−2	54	
11	Torrevieja	38	14	10	14	46	47	−1	52	
12	Crevillente	38	13	12	13	41	37	+4	51	
13	Muro	38	13	10	15	44	51	−7	49	
14	Paterna	38	10	11	17	38	53	−15	41	
15	Borriol	38	10	10	18	36	51	−15	40	
16	Recambios Colón	38	12	3	23	42	61	−19	39	
17	Buñol	38	9	12	17	22	43	−21	39	
18	Jove Español (R)	38	8	14	16	34	48	−14	38	Relegation to Regional Preferente
19	Benigànim (R)	38	7	12	19	41	66	−25	33	Relegation to Regional Preferente
20	Acero (R)	38	4	11	23	28	69	−41	23	Relegation to Regional Preferente

Updated to match(es) played on 15 May 2016. Source:
Rules for classification: 1) points; 2) head-to-head points; 3) head-to-head goal difference; 4) goal difference; 5) number of goals scored; 6) fair-play points; 7) playoff match
(P) Promoted; (R) Relegated

Top goalscorers

Goalscorers	Goals	Team
(Spain) Nuha Marong	21	Elche Ilicitano
(Spain) Carlos Esteve	19	Atlético Saguntino
(Spain) David Grande	19	Alzira
(Spain) Jorge Seral	16	Acero
(Spain) Mario González	15	Villarreal C

Top goalkeeper

Goalkeeper	Goals	Matches	Average	Team
(Spain) Adrián Lluna	23	33	0.7	Atlético Saguntino

== Group 7 – Community of Madrid ==
=== Teams ===
Location of teams of the 2015–16 Tercera División Group 7
Teams in Alcorcón: Alcorcón B, Trival Valderas
Teams in Madrid: Atlético Madrid B, Moscardó, Puerta Bonita, Rayo Vallecano B, Unión Adarve

Team	City	Home ground
Alcalá	Alcalá de Henares	Municipal del Val
Alcobendas Sport	Alcobendas	José Caballero
Alcorcón B	Alcorcón	Anexo de Santo Domingo
Aravaca	Madrid	Antonio Sanfiz
Atlético Madrid B	Madrid	Cerro del Espino
Atlético Pinto	Pinto	Amelia del Castillo
Collado Villalba	Collado Villalba	Ciudad Deportiva
Internacional	Moraleja de Enmedio	Dehesa de la Villa
Lugo Fuenlabrada	Fuenlabrada	El Naranjo
Moscardó	Madrid	Román Valero
Móstoles URJC	Móstoles	El Soto
Navalcarnero	Navalcarnero	Mariano González
Parla	Parla	Los Prados
Pozuelo de Alarcón	Pozuelo de Alarcón	Valle de las Cañas
Puerta Bonita	Madrid	Antiguo Canódromo
Rayo Vallecano B	Madrid	Ciudad Deportiva
San Fernando de Henares	San Fernando de Henares	Santiago del Pino
San Sebastián de los Reyes	San Sebastián de los Reyes	Matapiñonera
Trival Valderas	Alcorcón	La Canaleja
Unión Adarve	Madrid	Vereda de Ganapanes

=== League table ===
Pos	Team	Pld	W	D	L	GF	GA	GD	Pts	Qualification or relegation
1	San Sebastián de los Reyes (P)	38	24	9	5	68	26	+42	81	Qualification to group champions' playoffs
2	Navalcarnero (P)	38	20	12	6	76	42	+34	72	Qualification to promotion playoffs
3	Pozuelo de Alarcón	38	18	15	5	52	34	+18	69	Qualification to promotion playoffs
4	Atlético Madrid B	38	17	13	8	48	29	+19	64	Qualification to promotion playoffs
5	San Fernando de Henares	38	16	12	10	58	45	+13	60	
6	Unión Adarve	38	17	8	13	55	38	+17	59	
7	Atlético Pinto	38	15	12	11	42	36	+6	57	
8	Alcalá	38	17	6	15	53	49	+4	57	
9	Trival Valderas	38	15	12	11	44	35	+9	57	
10	Alcorcón B	38	15	10	13	57	53	+4	55	
11	Móstoles URJC	38	12	16	10	48	40	+8	52	
12	Alcobendas Sport	38	12	14	12	47	40	+7	50	
13	Aravaca	38	10	17	11	43	48	−5	47	
14	Parla	38	12	11	15	41	50	−9	47	
15	Rayo Vallecano B	38	10	16	12	44	42	+2	46	
16	Internacional	38	9	16	13	33	43	−10	43	
17	Moscardó (R)	38	7	13	18	36	55	−19	34	Relegation to Preferente
18	Puerta Bonita (R)	38	6	15	17	40	56	−16	33	Relegation to Preferente
19	Lugo Fuenlabrada (R)	38	7	11	20	31	57	−26	32	Relegation to Preferente
20	Collado Villalba (Note: Collado Villalba was docked 3 points.) (R)	38	1	2	35	19	117	−98	2	Relegation to Preferente

Updated to match(es) played on 15 May 2016. Source:
Rules for classification: 1) points; 2) head-to-head points; 3) head-to-head goal difference; 4) goal difference; 5) number of goals scored; 6) fair-play points; 7) playoff match
(P) Promoted; (R) Relegated
Notes:

Top goalscorers

Goalscorers	Goals	Team
(Spain) Gerardo Berodia	23	Navalcarnero
(Spain) Christian Seubert	17	San Sebastián de los Reyes
(Spain) David Barca	17	San Fernando de Henares
(Spain) Víctor Manquillo	16	Alcorcón B
(Spain) Álvaro Sánchez	16	Aravaca

Top goalkeeper

Goalkeeper	Goals	Matches	Average	Team
(Spain) Bernabé Barragán	28	36	0.78	Atlético Madrid B

== Group 8 – Castile and León ==
=== Teams ===
Location of teams of the 2015–16 Tercera División Group 8

Team	City	Home ground
Almazán	Almazán	La Arboleda
Atlético Bembibre	Bembibre	La Devesa
Atlético Tordesillas	Tordesillas	Las Salinas
Becerril	Becerril de Campos	Mariano Haro
Beroil Bupolsa	Burgos	Pallafría
Burgos Promesas	Burgos	Castañares
Cebrereña	Cebreros	El Mancho
Ciudad Rodrigo	Ciudad Rodrigo	Francisco Mateos
Cristo Atlético	Palencia	El Otero
Gimnástica Segoviana	Segovia	La Albuera
La Bañeza	La Bañeza	La Llanera
La Virgen del Camino	La Virgen del Camino	Los Dominicos
Mirandés B	Miranda de Ebro	Anduva
Numancia B	Soria	Francisco Rubio
Palencia	Palencia	La Balastera
Santa Marta	Santa Marta de Tormes	Alfonso San Casto
Sporting Uxama	El Burgo de Osma	Municipal
Villamuriel	Villamuriel de Cerrato	Rafael Vázquez Sedano
Villaralbo	Villaralbo	Ciudad Deportiva
Zamora	Zamora	Ruta de la Plata

=== League table ===
Pos	Team	Pld	W	D	L	GF	GA	GD	Pts	Qualification or relegation
1	Zamora	38	25	9	4	75	29	+46	84	Qualification to group champions' playoffs
2	Gimnástica Segoviana	38	23	8	7	74	32	+42	77	Qualification to promotion playoffs
3	Palencia (P)	38	23	6	9	64	26	+38	75	Qualification to promotion playoffs
4	Villaralbo	38	22	5	11	52	26	+26	71	Qualification to promotion playoffs
5	La Bañeza	38	20	10	8	53	30	+23	70	
6	La Virgen del Camino	38	18	8	12	55	52	+3	62	
7	Atlético Tordesillas	38	15	9	14	52	53	−1	54	
8	Atlético Bembibre	38	14	11	13	48	44	+4	53	
9	Sporting Uxama	38	15	6	17	37	53	−16	51	
10	Numancia B	38	14	8	16	51	43	+8	50	
11	Almazán	38	13	10	15	50	53	−3	49	
12	Cebrereña	38	12	10	16	55	61	−6	46	
13	Villamuriel	38	12	10	16	38	47	−9	46	
14	Beroil Bupolsa	38	12	10	16	37	41	−4	46	
15	Burgos Promesas	38	11	10	17	33	50	−17	43	
16	Cristo Atlético	38	10	10	18	40	63	−23	40	
17	Mirandés B	38	10	6	22	39	67	−28	36	
18	Ciudad Rodrigo (R)	38	9	9	20	38	68	−30	36	Relegation to Primera Regional
19	Santa Marta (R)	38	8	12	18	37	57	−20	36	Relegation to Primera Regional
20	Becerril (R)	38	4	13	21	34	67	−33	25	Relegation to Primera Regional

Updated to match(es) played on 15 May 2016. Source:
Rules for classification: 1) points; 2) head-to-head points; 3) head-to-head goal difference; 4) goal difference; 5) number of goals scored; 6) fair-play points; 7) playoff match
(P) Promoted; (R) Relegated

Top goalscorers

Goalscorers	Goals	Team
(Spain) David Terleira	27	Cebrereña
(Spain) Rubén Moreno	25	Zamora
(Spain) Ayrton Cabral	21	Gimnástica Segoviana
(Spain) Diego Torres	18	Palencia
(Spain) Alfonso Gonzalo	18	Sporting Uxama

Top goalkeeper

Goalkeeper	Goals	Matches	Average	Team
(Spain) Pablo Carmona	20	36	0.56	Palencia

== Group 9 – Eastern Andalusia and Melilla ==
=== Teams ===
Location of teams of the 2015–16 Tercera División Group 9
Teams in Málaga: Atlético Malagueño, El Palo

Team	City	Home ground
Alhaurín de la Torre	Alhaurín de la Torre	Los Manantiales
Antequera	Antequera	El Maulí
Atarfe Industrial	Atarfe	Municipal
Atlético Malagueño	Málaga	El Viso
Atlético Mancha Real	Mancha Real	La Juventud
Comarca del Mármol	Macael	Pedro Pastor
El Ejido	El Ejido	Santo Domingo
El Palo	Málaga	San Ignacio
Español	Almería	Los Pinos
Guadix	Guadix	Municipal
Huétor Tájar	Huétor-Tájar	Miguel Moranto
Loja	Loja	Medina Lauxa
Los Villares	Los Villares	José Antonio Manrique
Maracena	Maracena	Ciudad Deportiva
Martos	Martos	Ciudad de Martos
River Melilla	Melilla	La Espiguera
Rincón	Rincón de la Victoria	Francisco Romero
Ronda	Ronda	Ciudad Deportiva
San Pedro	San Pedro de Alcántara	Municipal
Vélez	Vélez-Málaga	Vivar Téllez

=== League table ===
Pos	Team	Pld	W	D	L	GF	GA	GD	Pts	Qualification or relegation
1	Atlético Mancha Real (P)	38	27	5	6	73	25	+48	86	Qualification to group champions' playoffs
2	Atlético Malagueño	38	26	8	4	96	34	+62	86	Qualification to promotion playoffs
3	Loja	38	24	9	5	68	26	+42	81	Qualification to promotion playoffs
4	El Ejido (P)	38	24	7	7	77	32	+45	79	Qualification to promotion playoffs
5	El Palo	38	21	13	4	69	24	+45	76	
6	Antequera	38	21	8	9	67	33	+34	71	
7	Guadix	38	22	4	12	68	46	+22	70	
8	Vélez	38	18	11	9	55	33	+22	65	
9	Huétor Tájar	38	16	11	11	60	37	+23	59	
10	Martos	38	17	5	16	58	55	+3	56	
11	San Pedro	38	14	6	18	55	67	−12	48	
12	Los Villares	38	11	11	16	46	57	−11	44	
13	Rincón	38	10	11	17	48	59	−11	41	
14	Alhaurín de la Torre	38	12	4	22	42	67	−25	40	
15	Atarfe Industrial	38	9	9	20	45	71	−26	36	
16	Maracena	38	8	12	18	48	69	−21	36	
17	River Melilla	38	9	5	24	44	88	−44	32	
18	Comarca del Mármol (R)	38	7	10	21	30	62	−32	31	Relegation to División de Honor
19	Ronda (R)	38	8	0	30	32	97	−65	24	Relegation to División de Honor
20	Español (Note: Español del Alquián retired.) (D)	38	1	1	36	11	110	−99	0	Relegation to División de Honor

Updated to match(es) played on 15 May 2016. Source:
Rules for classification: 1) points; 2) head-to-head points; 3) head-to-head goal difference; 4) goal difference; 5) number of goals scored; 6) fair-play points; 7) playoff match
(D) Disqualified; (P) Promoted; (R) Relegated
Notes:

Top goalscorers

Goalscorers	Goals	Team
(Venezuela) Jaime Moreno	23	Atlético Malagueño
(Spain) Elady Zorrilla	21	Atlético Mancha Real
(Spain) Darío Guti	20	El Ejido
(Spain) Falu Aranda	17	El Palo
(Spain) Fefo Manzano	17	Guadix

Top goalkeeper

Goalkeeper	Goals	Matches	Average	Team
(Spain) Emilio Muñoz	24	36	0.67	Atlético Mancha Real

== Group 10 – Western Andalusia and Ceuta ==
=== Teams ===
Location of teams of the 2015–16 Tercera División Group 10

Team	City	Home ground
Alcalá	Alcalá de Guadaira	Nuevo Estadio
Arcos	Arcos de la Frontera	Antonio Barbadillo
Atlético Sanluqueño	Sanlúcar de Barrameda	El Palmar
Cabecense	Las Cabezas de San Juan	Carlos Marchena
Castilleja	Castilleja de la Cuesta	Municipal
Ceuta	Ceuta	Alfonso Murube
Conil	Conil de la Frontera	José Antonio Pérez Ureba
Córdoba B	Córdoba	Rafael Gómez
Coria	Coria del Río	Guadalquivir
Écija	Écija	San Pablo
Gerena	Gerena	José Juan Romero Gil
Guadalcacín	Guadalcacín, Jerez de la Frontera	Municipal
Lebrijana	Lebrija	Polideportivo Municipal
Los Barrios	Los Barrios	San Rafael
Lucena	Lucena	Ciudad de Lucena
Roteña	Rota	Arturo Puntas Vela
San Fernando	San Fernando	Iberoamericano
San Juan	San Juan de Aznalfarache	Primero de Mayo
San Roque	San Roque	Manolo Mesa
Sevilla C	Seville	José Ramón Cisneros
Utrera	Utrera	San Juan Bosco

=== League table ===
Pos	Team	Pld	W	D	L	GF	GA	GD	Pts	Qualification or relegation
1	Córdoba B (P)	40	27	4	9	90	42	+48	85	Qualification to group champions' playoffs
2	Atlético Sanluqueño (P)	40	23	10	7	71	34	+37	79	Qualification to promotion playoffs
3	San Fernando (P)	40	21	12	7	69	30	+39	75	Qualification to promotion playoffs
4	Alcalá	40	21	10	9	59	33	+26	73	Qualification to promotion playoffs
5	Gerena	40	16	13	11	65	46	+19	61	
6	Ceuta	40	14	16	10	47	43	+4	58	
7	Arcos	40	15	13	12	44	43	+1	58	
8	Sevilla C	40	13	16	11	43	44	−1	55	
9	Castilleja	40	15	10	15	49	54	−5	55	
10	Los Barrios	40	16	7	17	54	56	−2	55	
11	Guadalcacín	40	13	15	12	42	50	−8	54	
12	Écija	40	14	10	16	58	54	+4	52	
13	Utrera	40	14	10	16	70	76	−6	52	
14	San Roque	40	12	14	14	46	52	−6	50	
15	Lebrijana	40	13	10	17	45	59	−14	49	
16	Cabecense	40	12	13	15	49	57	−8	49	
17	Coria	40	10	18	12	38	39	−1	48	
18	San Juan (R)	40	14	6	20	42	53	−11	48	Relegation to División de Honor
19	Conil (R)	40	10	9	21	41	65	−24	39	Relegation to División de Honor
20	Roteña (R)	40	9	9	22	43	73	−30	36	Relegation to División de Honor
21	Lucena (Note: Lucena retired of the competition.) (D)	40	2	7	31	19	81	−62	0	Relegation to División de Honor

Updated to match(es) played on 15 May 2016. Source:
Rules for classification: 1) points; 2) head-to-head points; 3) head-to-head goal difference; 4) goal difference; 5) number of goals scored; 6) fair-play points; 7) playoff match
(D) Disqualified; (P) Promoted; (R) Relegated
Notes:

Top goalscorers

Goalscorers	Goals	Team
(Spain) Alberto Quiles	22	Córdoba B
(Spain) Moha Traoré	20	Córdoba B
(Spain) Marc Cardona	19	Atlético Sanluqueño
(Spain) Sebas Moyano	18	Córdoba B
(Spain) Stoichkov	16	San Roque

Top goalkeeper

Goalkeeper	Goals	Matches	Average	Team
(Spain) Nico Monclova	32	38	0.84	Alcalá

== Group 11 – Balearic Islands ==
=== Teams ===
Location of teams of the 2015–16 Tercera División Group 11
Teams in Palma: Collerense, Mallorca B, Rotlet Molinar, Santa Catalina Atlético

Team	City	Home ground
Alaró	Alaró	Municipal
Alcúdia	Alcúdia	Els Arcs
Binissalem	Binissalem	Miquel Pons
Campos	Campos	Municipal
Ciutadella	Ciutadella de Menorca	Son Marçal
Collerense	Palma	Ca'n Caimari
Constància	Inca	Municipal
Esporles	Esporles	Son Quint
Ferriolense	Son Ferriol	Municipal
Formentera	Sant Francesc Xavier	Municipal
Mallorca B	Palma	Son Bibiloni
Mercadal	Es Mercadal	San Martí
Montuïri	Montuïri	Es Revolt
Platges de Calvià	Calvià	Municipal de Magaluf
Peña Deportiva	Santa Eulària des Riu	Municipal
Poblense	Sa Pobla	Nou Camp
Rotlet Molinar	Palma	Rotlet Molinar
Sant Rafel	Sant Rafel	Municipal
Santa Catalina Atlético	Palma	Son Flo
Sóller	Sóller	Camp d'en Maiol

=== League table ===
Pos	Team	Pld	W	D	L	GF	GA	GD	Pts	Qualification or relegation
1	Mallorca B (P)	38	24	8	6	79	29	+50	80	Qualification to group champions' playoffs
2	Formentera	38	23	9	6	69	29	+40	78	Qualification to promotion playoffs
3	Peña Deportiva	38	21	11	6	63	32	+31	74	Qualification to promotion playoffs
4	Constància	38	17	14	7	58	30	+28	65	Qualification to promotion playoffs
5	Poblense	38	16	14	8	57	30	+27	62	
6	Alcúdia	38	18	7	13	52	39	+13	61	
7	Mercadal	38	17	10	11	49	42	+7	61	
8	Binissalem	38	16	11	11	49	38	+11	59	
9	Montuïri	38	15	12	11	49	49	0	57	
10	Collerense	38	16	7	15	52	51	+1	55	
11	Sant Rafel	38	13	14	11	43	37	+6	53	
12	Ferriolense	38	11	12	15	36	42	−6	45	
13	Campos	38	10	14	14	47	59	−12	44	
14	Ciutadella	38	11	10	17	46	61	−15	43	
15	Esporles	38	11	7	20	35	56	−21	40	
16	Rotlet Molinar	38	9	11	18	42	70	−28	38	
17	Santa Catalina Atlético	38	9	10	19	33	52	−19	37	
18	Platges de Calvià (R)	38	7	14	17	28	55	−27	35	Relegation to Primera Regional Preferente
19	Sóller (R)	38	5	9	24	32	81	−49	24	Relegation to Primera Regional Preferente
20	Alaró (R)	38	4	10	24	18	55	−37	22	Relegation to Primera Regional Preferente

Updated to match(es) played on 15 May 2016. Source:
Rules for classification: 1) points; 2) head-to-head points; 3) head-to-head goal difference; 4) goal difference; 5) number of goals scored; 6) fair-play points; 7) playoff match
(P) Promoted; (R) Relegated

Top goalscorers

Goalscorers	Goals	Team
(Spain) Mateo Ferrer	28	Mallorca B
(Spain) Alberto Górriz	17	Formentera
(Senegal) Winde Samb	15	Peña Deportiva
(Spain) Jordi Martí	14	Formentera
(Spain) David Camps	13	Peña Deportiva

Top goalkeeper

Goalkeeper	Goals	Matches	Average	Team
(Spain) Molondro	21	33	0.64	Poblense

== Group 12 – Canary Islands ==
=== Teams ===
Location of teams of the 2015–16 Tercera División Group 12
Teams in Las Palmas: Las Palmas Atlético, Sporting San José, Unión Viera

Team	City	Home ground
Arucas	Arucas	Tonono
Atlético Granadilla	Granadilla de Abona	Francisco Suárez
Cruz Santa	Los Realejos	La Suerte
El Cotillo	La Oliva	Municipal
Ibarra	Arona	Villa Isabel
Lanzarote	Arrecife	Ciudad Deportiva
Las Palmas Atlético	Las Palmas	Anexo Gran Canaria
Las Zocas	San Miguel de Abona	Juanito Marrero
Marino	Los Cristianos	Antonio Domínguez
UD San Fernando	San Bartolomé de Tirajana	Ciudad Deportiva
Santa Úrsula	Santa Úrsula	Argelio Tabares
Sporting San José	Las Palmas	Chano Cruz
Telde	Telde	Pablo Hernández
Tenerife B	Santa Cruz de Tenerife	Centro Insular
Tenisca	Santa Cruz de La Palma	Virgen de las Nieves
La Cuadra-Unión Puerto	Puerto del Rosario	Municipal de Los Pozos
Unión Sur Yaiza	Yaiza	Municipal
Unión Viera	Las Palmas	Pepe Gonçalvez
Vera	Puerto de la Cruz	Salvador Ledesma
Villa de Santa Brígida	Santa Brígida	El Guiniguada

=== League table ===
Pos	Team	Pld	W	D	L	GF	GA	GD	Pts	Qualification or relegation
1	Villa de Santa Brígida	38	24	9	5	59	26	+33	81	Qualification to group champions' playoffs
2	Lanzarote	38	20	15	3	67	28	+39	75	Qualification to promotion playoffs
3	Las Palmas Atlético	38	21	10	7	70	37	+33	73	Qualification to promotion playoffs
4	Tenisca	38	21	8	9	60	38	+22	71	Qualification to promotion playoffs
5	UD San Fernando	38	17	13	8	41	26	+15	64	
6	Las Zocas	38	18	9	11	47	34	+13	63	
7	El Cotillo	38	18	8	12	58	52	+6	62	
8	Telde	38	17	9	12	59	39	+20	60	
9	Tenerife B	38	17	8	13	56	36	+20	59	
10	Ibarra	38	18	3	17	63	46	+17	57	
11	Unión Sur Yaiza	38	14	10	14	47	43	+4	52	
12	Vera	38	13	13	12	59	52	+7	52	
13	Santa Úrsula	38	11	14	13	41	47	−6	47	
14	Arucas	38	11	13	14	36	41	−5	46	
15	Unión Viera	38	12	7	19	44	54	−10	43	
16	La Cuadra-Unión Puerto	38	10	7	21	36	61	−25	37	
17	Marino	38	8	9	21	36	67	−31	33	
18	Sporting San José (R)	38	7	7	24	28	63	−35	28	Relegation to Interinsular Preferente
19	Cruz Santa (R)	38	4	12	22	23	61	−38	24	Relegation to Interinsular Preferente
20	Atlético Granadilla (R)	38	3	8	27	27	106	−79	17	Relegation to Interinsular Preferente

Updated to match(es) played on 15 May 2016. Source:
Rules for classification: 1) points; 2) head-to-head points; 3) head-to-head goal difference; 4) goal difference; 5) number of goals scored; 6) fair-play points; 7) playoff match
(R) Relegated

Top goalscorers

Goalscorers	Goals	Team
(Spain) Dani Ojeda	23	Telde
(Uruguay) Pedro Manzi	23	Ibarra
(Spain) Rosmen Quevedo	19	Lanzarote
(Spain) Manu Dimas	18	Las Palmas Atlético
(Spain) Ale Peraza	17	Unión Viera

Top goalkeeper

Goalkeeper	Goals	Matches	Average	Team
(Argentina) Pablo Varela	25	37	0.68	UD San Fernando

== Group 13 – Region of Murcia ==
=== Teams ===
Location of teams of the 2015–16 Tercera División Group 13
Teams in Murcia: Ciudad de Murcia, Murcia Imperial

Team	City	Home ground
Águilas	Águilas	El Rubial
Alhama	Alhama de Murcia	José María Soriano
Atlético Pulpileño	Pulpí	San Miguel
Caravaca	Caravaca de la Cruz	Antonio Martínez
Ciudad de Murcia	Murcia	José Barnés
Churra	Churra, Murcia	Municipal
Deportiva Minera	Llano del Beal, Cartagena	Ángel Cedrán
El Palmar	El Palmar, Murcia	Municipal
Huércal-Overa	Huércal-Overa	El Hornillo
La Unión	La Unión	Municipal
Lorca Deportiva	Lorca	Francisco Artés Carrasco
Mar Menor	San Javier	Pitín
Muleño	Mula	Municipal
Nueva Vanguardia	Alcantarilla	Ángel Sornichero
Murcia Imperial	Murcia	Santiago El Mayor
Pinatar Arena	San Pedro del Pinatar	José Antonio Pérez
Plus Ultra	Llano de Brujas, Murcia	Municipal
Yeclano	Yecla	La Constitución

=== League table ===
Pos	Team	Pld	W	D	L	GF	GA	GD	Pts	Qualification or relegation
1	Lorca Deportiva	34	24	6	4	64	16	+48	78	Qualification to group champions' playoffs
2	Águilas	34	24	5	5	62	29	+33	77	Qualification to promotion playoffs
3	El Palmar Estrella Grana	34	20	6	8	71	30	+41	66	Qualification to promotion playoffs
4	Mar Menor	34	19	6	9	58	39	+19	63	Qualification to promotion playoffs
5	Yeclano	34	18	8	8	52	27	+25	62	
6	La Unión	34	16	11	7	51	38	+13	59	
7	Huércal-Overa	34	14	8	12	42	41	+1	50	
8	Murcia Imperial	34	15	4	15	45	39	+6	49	
9	Deportiva Minera	34	13	7	14	56	61	−5	46	
10	Muleño	34	13	6	15	40	48	−8	45	
11	Nueva Vanguardia	34	12	5	17	50	42	+8	41	
12	Churra	34	12	5	17	37	45	−8	41	
13	Ciudad de Murcia (Note: Ciudad de Murcia was docked 3 points after finishing a game with less than seven players.)	34	11	6	17	45	56	−11	36	
14	Atlético Pulpileño	34	8	11	15	33	43	−10	35	
15	Pinatar Arena	34	8	7	19	41	59	−18	31	
16	Plus Ultra (R)	34	7	10	17	35	55	−20	31	Relegation to Preferente Autonómica
17	Alhama (R)	34	6	8	20	39	69	−30	26	Relegation to Preferente Autonómica
18	Caravaca (R)	34	3	7	24	29	113	−84	16	Relegation to Preferente Autonómica

Updated to match(es) played on 15 May 2016. Source:
Rules for classification: 1) points; 2) head-to-head points; 3) head-to-head goal difference; 4) goal difference; 5) number of goals scored; 6) fair-play points; 7) playoff match
(R) Relegated
Notes:

Top goalscorers

Goalscorers	Goals	Team
(Spain) Andrés Carrasco	32	Lorca
(Spain) Ramón Marín	18	Mar Menor
(Spain) Joaquín Sánchez	17	Espinardo Atlético
(Spain) Borja Cantarutti	16	Águilas
(Spain) Ginés Meca	15	Atlético Pulpileño

Top goalkeeper

Goalkeeper	Goals	Matches	Average	Team
(Spain) Gerardo Rubio	14	29	0.48	Lorca

== Group 14 – Extremadura ==
=== Teams ===
Location of teams of the 2015–16 Tercera División Group 14

Team	City	Home ground
Amanecer	Sierra de Fuentes	San Isidro
Arroyo	Arroyo de la Luz	Municipal
Atlético Pueblonuevo	Pueblonuevo del Guadiana	Antonio Amaya
Azuaga	Azuaga	Municipal
Badajoz	Badajoz	Nuevo Vivero
Calamonte	Calamonte	Municipal
Coria	Coria	La Isla
Deportivo Pacense	Badajoz	Vivero
Díter Zafra	Zafra	Nuevo Estadio
Don Benito	Don Benito	Vicente Sanz
Extremadura	Almendralejo	Francisco de la Hera
Fuente de Cantos	Fuente de Cantos	Francisco de Zurbarán
Jerez	Jerez de los Caballeros	Manuel Calzado Galván
Moralo	Navalmoral de la Mata	Municipal
Olivenza	Olivenza	Municipal
San José Promesas	Almendralejo	Tomás de la Hera
Santa Amalia	Santa Amalia	Municipal
Sanvicenteño	San Vicente de Alcántara	Ciudad Deportiva
Valdelacalzada	Valdelacalzada	Municipal
Valdivia	Valdivia, Villanueva de la Serena	Primero de Mayo

=== League table ===
Pos	Team	Pld	W	D	L	GF	GA	GD	Pts	Qualification or relegation
1	Extremadura (P)	38	27	9	2	106	25	+81	90	Qualification to group champions' playoffs
2	Badajoz	38	26	9	3	90	25	+65	87	Qualification to promotion playoffs
3	Arroyo	38	25	9	4	78	23	+55	84	Qualification to promotion playoffs
4	Jerez	38	25	8	5	69	24	+45	83	Qualification to promotion playoffs
5	Don Benito	38	18	12	8	53	39	+14	66	
6	Azuaga	38	18	10	10	75	47	+28	64	
7	Calamonte	38	20	2	16	68	66	+2	62	
8	Atlético Pueblonuevo	38	15	12	11	49	41	+8	57	
9	Coria	38	15	10	13	56	44	+12	55	
10	Díter Zafra	38	13	8	17	45	65	−20	47	
11	San José Promesas	38	13	7	18	39	59	−20	46	
12	Moralo	38	11	11	16	53	58	−5	44	
13	Fuente de Cantos	38	11	10	17	46	66	−20	43	
14	Valdivia	38	12	6	20	34	63	−29	42	
15	Olivenza	38	9	9	20	38	61	−23	36	
16	Amanecer	38	7	12	19	35	66	−31	33	
17	Santa Amalia	38	7	10	21	35	70	−35	31	
18	Sanvicenteño (R)	38	9	4	25	36	83	−47	31	Relegation to Regional Preferente
19	Valdelacalzada (R)	38	6	9	23	29	71	−42	27	Relegation to Regional Preferente
20	Deportivo Pacense (R)	38	6	7	25	42	80	−38	25	Relegation to Regional Preferente

Updated to match(es) played on 15 May 2016. Source:
Rules for classification: 1) points; 2) head-to-head points; 3) head-to-head goal difference; 4) goal difference; 5) number of goals scored; 6) fair-play points; 7) playoff match
(P) Promoted; (R) Relegated

Top goalscorers

Goalscorers	Goals	Team
(Spain) Willy Ledesma	31	Extremadura
(Spain) Enrique Carreño	27	Badajoz
(Spain) Enrique Pizarro	26	Azuaga
(Spain) Aday Benítez	20	Arroyo
(Spain) Álvaro Romero	20	Azuaga

Top goalkeeper

Goalkeeper	Goals	Matches	Average	Team
(Romania) George Savu	19	32	0.59	Arroyo

== Group 15 – Navarre ==
=== Teams ===
Location of teams of the 2015–16 Tercera División Group 15
Teams in Pamplona: Txantrea, Iruña, Oberena, Osasuna B, Pamplona, San Juan

Team	City	Home ground
Ardoi	Zizur Mayor	El Pinar
Atlético Cirbonero	Cintruénigo	San Juan
Baztán	Elizondo	Giltxaurdi
Beti Onak	Villava	Lorenzo Goikoa
Burladés	Burlada	Ripagaina
Cantolagua	Sangüesa	Cantolagua
Cortes	Cortes	San Francisco Javier
Erriberri	Olite	San Miguel
Huarte	Huarte/Uharte	Areta
Iruña	Pamplona	Orkoien
Mendi	Mendigorria	El Pontarrón
Mutilvera	Mutilva, Aranguren	Valle Aranguren
Oberena	Pamplona	Oberena
Osasuna B	Pamplona	Tajonar
Pamplona	Pamplona	Bidezarra
River Ega	Andosilla	Andola
San Juan	Pamplona	San Juan
Subiza	Subiza	Sotoburu
Txantrea	Pamplona	Txantrea
Valle de Egüés	Egüés	Sarriguren

=== League table ===
Pos	Team	Pld	W	D	L	GF	GA	GD	Pts	Qualification or relegation
1	Osasuna B (P)	38	25	9	4	81	24	+57	84	Qualification to group champions' playoffs
2	Atlético Cirbonero	38	24	8	6	67	32	+35	80	Qualification to promotion playoffs
3	San Juan	38	23	8	7	65	31	+34	77	Qualification to promotion playoffs
4	Mutilvera (P)	38	22	10	6	81	35	+46	76	Qualification to promotion playoffs
5	Cortes	38	21	10	7	48	30	+18	73	
6	Ardoi	38	17	14	7	69	40	+29	65	
7	Valle de Egüés	38	15	10	13	55	52	+3	55	
8	Burladés	38	14	8	16	47	43	+4	50	
9	River Ega	38	15	5	18	48	58	−10	50	
10	Subiza	38	12	13	13	57	62	−5	49	
11	Txantrea	38	13	9	16	70	66	+4	48	
12	Pamplona	38	12	11	15	50	49	+1	47	
13	Cantolagua	38	11	11	16	40	54	−14	44	
14	Iruña	38	12	8	18	51	58	−7	44	
15	Erriberri	38	10	12	16	22	53	−31	42	
16	Huarte	38	9	12	17	39	52	−13	39	
17	Oberena	38	9	10	19	38	67	−29	37	
18	Baztán (R)	38	9	5	24	53	97	−44	32	Relegation to Regional Preferente
19	Beti Onak (R)	38	6	10	22	42	81	−39	28	Relegation to Regional Preferente
20	Mendi (R)	38	5	9	24	34	73	−39	24	Relegation to Regional Preferente

Updated to match(es) played on 14 May 2016. Source:
Rules for classification: 1) points; 2) head-to-head points; 3) head-to-head goal difference; 4) goal difference; 5) number of goals scored; 6) fair-play points; 7) playoff match
(P) Promoted; (R) Relegated

Top goalscorers

Goalscorers	Goals	Team
(Spain) Joseba Alkuaz	26	Txantrea
(Spain) David Lizoain	25	Ardoi
(Spain) Álvaro Arizcuren	20	Ardoi
(Spain) Miguel Díaz	17	Osasuna B
(Spain) Peio Ibáñez	15	Burladés

Top goalkeeper

Goalkeeper	Goals	Matches	Average	Team
(Spain) Santi Navarro	30	38	0.79	Cortes

== Group 16 – La Rioja ==
=== Teams ===
Location of teams of the 2013–14 Tercera División Group 16
Teams in Logroño: Calasancio, Peña Balsamaiso, SD Logroñés, Varea, Villegas

Team	City	Home ground
Agoncillo	Agoncillo	San Roque
Alberite	Alberite	Marino Sáenz
Alfaro	Alfaro	La Molineta
Anguiano	Anguiano	Isla
Arnedo	Arnedo	Sendero
Atlético Vianés	Viana	Municipal
Calahorra	Calahorra	La Planilla
Calasancio	Logroño	La Estrella
Haro	Haro	El Mazo
La Calzada	Santo Domingo de la Calzada	El Rollo
Náxara	Nájera	La Salera
Oyonesa	Oyón	El Espinar
Peña Balsamaiso	Logroño	El Salvador
Pradejón	Pradejón	Municipal
River Ebro	Rincón de Soto	San Miguel
San Marcial	Lardero	Ángel de Vicente
SD Logroñés	Logroño	Las Gaunas
Tedeón	Navarrete	San Miguel
Varea	Logroño	Municipal
Villegas	Logroño	La Ribera

=== League table ===
Pos	Team	Pld	W	D	L	GF	GA	GD	Pts	Qualification or relegation
1	Calahorra	38	32	3	3	110	19	+91	99	Qualification to group champions' playoffs
2	SD Logroñés	38	31	3	4	102	23	+79	96	Qualification to promotion playoffs
3	Haro	38	30	4	4	115	19	+96	94	Qualification to promotion playoffs
4	Náxara	38	29	4	5	98	37	+61	91	Qualification to promotion playoffs
5	Varea	38	23	7	8	98	44	+54	76	
6	Anguiano	38	23	6	9	74	36	+38	75	
7	Alfaro	38	15	9	14	48	52	−4	54	
8	Agoncillo	38	11	15	12	49	57	−8	48	
9	Calasancio	38	11	15	12	41	59	−18	48	
10	Oyonesa	38	12	9	17	51	69	−18	45	
11	River Ebro	38	11	6	21	44	60	−16	39	
12	San Marcial	38	9	9	20	33	57	−24	36	
13	Atlético Vianés	38	9	8	21	36	68	−32	35	
14	Villegas	38	8	10	20	30	64	−34	34	
15	La Calzada	38	8	10	20	39	71	−32	34	
16	Tedeón	38	8	10	20	34	75	−41	34	
17	Arnedo	38	8	9	21	42	90	−48	33	
18	Pradejón (R)	38	8	9	21	28	69	−41	33	Relegation to Regional Preferente
19	Peña Balsamaiso (R)	38	7	9	22	52	96	−44	30	Relegation to Regional Preferente
20	Alberite (R)	38	6	7	25	40	99	−59	25	Relegation to Regional Preferente

Updated to match(es) played on 15 May 2016. Source:
Rules for classification: 1) points; 2) head-to-head points; 3) head-to-head goal difference; 4) goal difference; 5) number of goals scored; 6) fair-play points; 7) playoff match
(R) Relegated

Top goalscorers

Goalscorers	Goals	Team
(Spain) Rubén Pérez	34	Varea
(Spain) Israel Losa	31	Calahorra
(Spain) Iban Vila	24	SD Logroñés
(Spain) Txutxi Sánchez	21	Haro
(Spain) Héctor Pérez	21	Peña Balsamaiso

Top goalkeeper

Goalkeeper	Goals	Matches	Average	Team
(Spain) Raúl Heras	36	33	1.09	Náxara

== Group 17 – Aragon ==
=== Teams ===
Location of teams of the 2015–16 Tercera División Group 17
Teams in Zaragoza: Atlético Escalerillas, Deportivo Aragón

Team	City	Home ground
Almudévar	Almudévar	La Corona
Andorra	Andorra	Juan Antonio Endeiza
Atlético Escalerillas	Zaragoza	Parque Oliver
Atlético Monzón	Monzón	Isidro Calderón
Belchite 97	Belchite	Municipal
Binéfar	Binéfar	Los Olmos
Borja	Borja	Manuel Meler
Cariñena	Cariñena	La Platera
Cuarte	Cuarte de Huerva	Nuevo Municipal
Deportivo Aragón	Zaragoza	Ciudad Deportiva
Ejea	Ejea de los Caballeros	Luchán
Fraga	Fraga	La Estacada
Illueca	Illueca	Papa Luna
Sabiñánigo	Sabiñánigo	Joaquín Ascaso
Sariñena	Sariñena	El Carmen
Tarazona	Tarazona	Municipal
Teruel	Teruel	Pinilla
Utebo	Utebo	Santa Ana
Villa de Alagón	Alagón	La Portalada
Villanueva	Villanueva de Gállego	Nuevo Enrique Porta

=== League table ===
Pos	Team	Pld	W	D	L	GF	GA	GD	Pts	Qualification or relegation
1	Deportivo Aragón	38	25	8	5	70	19	+51	83	Qualification to group champions' playoffs
2	Andorra	38	25	7	6	64	31	+33	82	Qualification to promotion playoffs
3	Tarazona	38	21	10	7	70	33	+37	73	Qualification to promotion playoffs
4	Teruel	38	19	14	5	69	38	+31	71	Qualification to promotion playoffs
5	Sariñena	38	20	8	10	52	26	+26	68	
6	Ejea	38	19	9	10	66	38	+28	66	
7	Almudévar	38	19	7	12	65	37	+28	64	
8	Utebo	38	18	7	13	59	58	+1	61	
9	Cariñena	38	14	7	17	50	61	−11	49	
10	Binéfar	38	12	11	15	36	48	−12	47	
11	Atlético Escalerillas	38	12	9	17	54	58	−4	45	
12	Borja	38	11	12	15	27	36	−9	45	
13	Illueca	38	11	10	17	46	63	−17	43	
14	Cuarte	38	11	8	19	40	52	−12	41	
15	Sabiñánigo	38	10	11	17	35	47	−12	41	
16	Belchite 97	38	9	12	17	35	59	−24	39	
17	Atlético Monzón (R)	38	10	9	19	40	66	−26	39	Relegation to Regional Preferente
18	Villa de Alagón (R)	38	9	9	20	40	68	−28	36	Relegation to Regional Preferente
19	Villanueva (R)	38	8	8	22	40	66	−26	32	Relegation to Regional Preferente
20	Fraga (R)	38	6	6	26	33	87	−54	24	Relegation to Regional Preferente

Updated to match(es) played on 15 May 2016. Source:
Rules for classification: 1) points; 2) head-to-head points; 3) head-to-head goal difference; 4) goal difference; 5) number of goals scored; 6) fair-play points; 7) playoff match
(R) Relegated

Top goalscorers

Goalscorers	Goals	Team
(Uruguay) Agus Alonso	27	Atlético Escalerillas
(Spain) Lucho Sánchez	21	Sariñena
(Spain) Diego Gómez	20	Andorra
(Spain) Mika Junco	19	Almudévar
(Spain) Kilian Grant	17	Deportivo Aragón

Top goalkeeper

Goalkeeper	Goals	Matches	Average	Team
(Spain) Álvaro Ratón	19	37	0.51	Deportivo Aragón

== Group 18 – Castile-La Mancha ==
=== Teams ===
Location of teams of the 2015–16 Tercera División Group 18

Team	City	Home ground
Albacete B	Albacete	Andrés Iniesta
Almagro	Almagro	Manuel Trujillo
Almansa	Almansa	Polideportivo Municipal
Atlético Ibañés	Casas-Ibáñez	Municipal
Azuqueca	Azuqueca de Henares	San Miguel
Ciudad Real	Ciudad Real	Juan Carlos I
Conquense	Cuenca	La Fuensanta
Illescas	Illescas	Municipal
La Gineta	La Gineta	San Martín
Madridejos	Madridejos	Nuevo Estadio
Manzanares	Manzanares	José Camacho
Marchamalo	Marchamalo	La Solana
Mora	Mora	Las Delicias
Munera	Munera	Municipal
Pedroñeras	Las Pedroñeras	Municipal
Quintanar del Rey	Quintanar del Rey	San Marcos
San José Obrero	Cuenca	La Beneficencia
Toledo B	Toledo	Salto del Caballo
Villarrobledo	Villarrobledo	Nuestra Señora de la Caridad
Villarrubia	Villarrubia de los Ojos	Nuevo Municipal

=== League table ===
Pos	Team	Pld	W	D	L	GF	GA	GD	Pts	Qualification or relegation
1	Conquense	38	24	4	10	54	26	+28	76	Qualification to group champions' playoffs
2	Almagro	38	22	10	6	64	33	+31	76	Qualification to promotion playoffs
3	Azuqueca	38	20	10	8	58	31	+27	70	Qualification to promotion playoffs
4	Almansa	38	17	15	6	54	35	+19	66	Qualification to promotion playoffs
5	Quintanar del Rey	38	17	11	10	38	29	+9	62	
6	Madridejos	38	16	12	10	47	45	+2	60	
7	Illescas	38	16	10	12	50	47	+3	58	
8	Villarrobledo	38	15	9	14	44	38	+6	54	
9	Marchamalo	38	14	10	14	51	53	−2	52	
10	Ciudad Real	38	14	9	15	41	36	+5	51	
11	Toledo B	38	14	9	15	50	48	+2	51	
12	Villarrubia	38	12	12	14	34	34	0	48	
13	Pedroñeras	38	12	12	14	36	42	−6	48	
14	Albacete B	38	10	16	12	47	51	−4	46	
15	Mora	38	13	7	18	43	48	−5	46	
16	Manzanares (X)	38	11	12	15	39	43	−4	45	Relegation to Primera Autonómica Preferente
17	Atlético Ibañés (X)	38	9	15	14	29	42	−13	42	Relegation to Primera Autonómica Preferente
18	La Gineta (R)	38	8	8	22	41	61	−20	32	Relegation to Primera Autonómica Preferente
19	San José Obrero (R)	38	7	10	21	37	70	−33	31	Relegation to Primera Autonómica Preferente
20	Munera (R)	38	5	7	26	28	73	−45	22	Relegation to Primera Autonómica Preferente

Updated to match(es) played on 15 May 2016. Source:
Rules for classification: 1) points; 2) head-to-head points; 3) head-to-head goal difference; 4) goal difference; 5) number of goals scored; 6) fair-play points; 7) playoff match
(R) Relegated; (X) Relegated due to the relegations of Regional teams in 2015–16 Segunda División B

Top goalscorers

Goalscorers	Goals	Team
(Spain) Esaú Rojo	25	Azuqueca
(Mali) Samba Tounkara	17	Conquense
(Spain) Alberto Zapata	16	Conquense
(Spain) Daniel Cabanillas	16	Marchamalo
(Spain) Miguel Ángel Ureña	15	Almagro

Top goalkeeper

Goalkeeper	Goals	Matches	Average	Team
(Spain) José Manuel Camacho	26	38	0.68	Conquense
