= Emilio Muñoz (footballer) =

Spanish footballer

Personal information
- Full name: Emilio Muñoz Barrero
- Date of birth: 16 January 1979 (age 47)
- Place of birth: Úbeda, Spain
- Height: 1.87 m (6 ft 1 1/2 in)
- Position: Goalkeeper

Youth career
- Úbeda

Senior career*
Years	Team	Apps	(Gls)
1997–1999	Úbeda	7	(0)
1998–1999	→ Alavés B (loan)	0	(0)
1999–2004	Jaén	20	(0)
2004–2007	Villajoyosa	122	(0)
2007–2008	Benidorm	32	(0)
2008–2009	Atlético Baleares	34	(0)
2009–2012	La Nucía	98	(0)
2012–2017	Mancha Real	179	(0)
2017–2018	Real Jaén	12	(0)
2018–2020	Atlético Porcuna	29	(0)
2020–2021	Torredonjimeno	15	(0)
2021–2022	Begijar CF		
2023–2024	Atlético Porcuna		
- * Club domestic league appearances and goals

Emilio Muñoz Barrero (born 16 January 1979), simply known as Emilio, is a Spanish former footballer who played as a goalkeeper.

== Club career ==
Born in Úbeda, Jaén, Andalusia, Emilio made his senior debut with hometown club Úbeda CF in 1997. In 1999, after a brief stint at Deportivo Alavés B, he moved to Segunda División B club Real Jaén.

After achieving promotion in 2000, Emilio made his professional debut on 20 May 2001, starting in a 2–2 away draw against Levante UD. He remained as a backup in the following years, and left the club in January 2004.

Emilio subsequently joined Villajoyosa CF in the third division, and continued to appear in the same category but also in Tercera División in the following years, representing Benidorm CF, CD Atlético Baleares, CF La Nucía and Atlético Mancha Real.
