= Extremadura UD =

Extremadura
- Full name: Extremadura Unión Deportiva, S.A.D.
- Nickname: Azulgranas
- Founded: 21 August 2007; 18 years ago
- Dissolved: 2022
- Ground: Francisco de la Hera; Almendralejo, Extremadura, Spain
- Capacity: 11,580
- President: Manuel Franganillo
- Head coach: Manuel Mosquera
- 2021–22: Primera División RFEF – Group 1, 20th of 20 (disqualified)
- Website: https://www.cdextremadura.es/
Home colours	Away colours	Third colours

Extremadura Unión Deportiva was a Spanish football team based in Almendralejo, in the autonomous community of Extremadura. Founded in 2007, it last played in Primera División RFEF – Group 1, holding home games at Estadio Francisco de la Hera.

== History ==
Extremadura Unión Deportiva was founded in 2007, as the existing CF Extremadura club was experiencing serious financial problems, which would lead to its folding three years later.

In only three seasons, the club reached the third division of Spanish football, having won in the 2010 playoffs against Atlético Mancha Real in June 2010. However, it finished 19th and last (due to AD Cerro de Reyes Badajoz Atlético retiring from competition) in its first campaign, being immediately relegated back.

Extremadura won their fourth-tier group in 2013, qualifying for the Copa del Rey for the first time. There, they lost 2–1 at home to Albacete Balompié in the first round.

In 2016, Extremadura were promoted again to Segunda División B with a 2–0 aggregate play-off win over UB Conquense. In 2018 the club was promoted for the first time to Segunda División after defeating FC Cartagena 1–0 on aggregate in the last round of the play-offs.

One of the stars of Extremadura's promotion was Enric Gallego, who arrived halfway through the season from UE Cornellà, and scored 15 goals in 19 games in his first professional campaign at the age of 32 before leaving for La Liga club SD Huesca in January 2019 for €2 million. After falling into the relegation zone around that point in the season, the club fired Rodri and hired Manuel Mosquera who guided them to safety; the end of the campaign was also marked by the death of veteran winger José Antonio Reyes in a car accident.

In July 2020, Extremadura was relegated back to the third tier after losing by a single goal away to Cádiz CF, amidst problems between the club president and shareholders. The club faced financial difficulties during most of the 2021–22 season, with several players opting to leave during the winter transfer window.

Extremadura changed ownership in January 2022, but as the financial problems were unsolved, the players began a strike in February. On 28 February, after two consecutive no-shows in the competition, the club was expelled from the division; RFEF confirmed the decision on 2 March, with the club being immediately relegated and being unavailable for promotion in the ensuing campaign.

In May 2022, as the club was already in a liquidation process, a new club named CD Extremadura 1924 was founded in the city, with the goal of obtaining Extremadura UD's place in the Segunda División RFEF.

== Season to season ==
Season	Tier	Division	Place	Copa del Rey
2007–08	6	1ª Reg.	1st	
2008–09	5	Reg. Pref.	1st	
2009–10	4	3ª	3rd	
2010–11	3	2ª B	19th	
2011–12	4	3ª	3rd	
2012–13	4	3ª	1st	
2013–14	4	3ª	6th	First round
2014–15	4	3ª	2nd	

Season	Tier	Division	Place	Copa del Rey
2015–16	4	3ª	1st	
2016–17	3	2ª B	13th	Second round
2017–18	3	2ª B	4th	
2018–19	2	2ª	13th	Second round
2019–20	2	2ª	21st	First round
2020–21	3	2ª B	2nd / 4th	First round
2021–22	3	1ª RFEF	(R)	First round

- 2 seasons in Segunda División
- 1 season in Primera División RFEF
- 4 seasons in Segunda División B
- 6 seasons in Tercera División

== Players ==
=== Retired numbers ===
19 – (Spain) José Antonio Reyes (2019) – posthumous honour

== Stadium ==
Estadio Francisco de la Hera, Extremadura's home ground, was built in 1996, and has a seated capacity of 11,580.

== Reserve team ==
Extremadura UD B was created after integrating San José Promesas in the club in 2016. In its first season, it played with the name of Extremadura San José, before changing to its current name in the next season.

== Women's team ==
Extremadura UD Femenino was born in July 2017, after integrating the structure of former Extremadura Femenino CF in the club.
