= UD Mutilvera =

Association football club in Spain

Mutilvera
- Full name: Unión Deportiva Mutilvera
- Nickname: Eternos hijos de amigó
- Founded: 1968
- Ground: Valle Araguren, Mutilva Baja, Aranguren, Navarre, Spain
- Capacity: 2,000
- President: (Spain) Iulen Romero Ibarrola
- Head coach: (Spain) Andoni Alonso
- League: Tercera Federación – Group 15
- 2025–26: Segunda Federación – Group 2, 16th of 18 (relegated)
- Website: mutilvera.com
Home colours	Away colours

Unión Deportiva Mutilvera is a Spanish football team based in Mutilva, Aranguren, in the autonomous community of Navarre. Founded in 1968, it plays in Tercera Federación – Group 15. Its stadium is Estadio Valle Aranguren with a capacity of 2,000 seaters.

== History ==
The club was founded in 1968 by Juan Contreras after the first meeting with young people from the town Mutilva Baja who had a dream of forming a football team. The club only played youth football until forming a senior team in 1991, playing two seasons as Club Deportivo Indarra before switching to the current name in 1993.

The team was promoted to Segunda División B for the first time ever in 2016 but played there only 1 season and returned to Tercera División.

== Season to season ==
Season	Tier	Division	Place	Copa del Rey
1991–92	6	1ª Reg.	18th	
1992–93	6	1ª Reg.	7th	
1993–94	6	1ª Reg.	4th	
1994–95	6	1ª Reg.	11th	
1995–96	6	1ª Reg.	8th	
1996–97	6	1ª Reg.	9th	
1997–98	6	1ª Reg.	4th	
1998–99	6	1ª Reg.	2nd	
1999–2000	5	Reg. Pref.	8th	
2000–01	5	Reg. Pref.	1st	
2001–02	4	3ª	10th	
2002–03	4	3ª	17th	
2003–04	4	3ª	5th	
2004–05	4	3ª	2nd	
2005–06	4	3ª	6th	
2006–07	4	3ª	3rd	
2007–08	4	3ª	2nd	
2008–09	4	3ª	4th	
2009–10	4	3ª	5th	
2010–11	4	3ª	4th	

Season	Tier	Division	Place	Copa del Rey
2011–12	4	3ª	4th	
2012–13	4	3ª	2nd	
2013–14	4	3ª	4th	
2014–15	4	3ª	5th	
2015–16	4	3ª	4th	
2016–17	3	2ª B	17th	
2017–18	4	3ª	1st	
2018–19	4	3ª	3rd	Third round
2019–20	4	3ª	1st	
2020–21	3	2ª B	7th / 1st	Second round
2021–22	4	2ª RFEF	11th	
2022–23	4	2ª Fed.	11th	
2023–24	4	2ª Fed.	15th	
2024–25	5	3ª Fed.	1st	
2025–26	4	2ª Fed.	16th	First round
2026–27	5	3ª Fed.		

- 2 seasons in Segunda División B
- 4 seasons in Segunda Federación/Segunda División RFEF
- 17 seasons in Tercera División
- 2 seasons in Tercera Federación

== Honours ==
- Tercera División: 2017–18

== Current squad ==
As of 2 February 2024

Note: Flags indicate national team as defined under FIFA eligibility rules; some limited exceptions apply. Players may hold more than one non-FIFA nationality.

No.	Pos.	Nation	Player
1	GK	ESP	Aitor Ekiza
2	DF	ESP	Álvaro Aldave
3	DF	ESP	Eloi Goñi
4	MF	ESP	Carlos Soroa
5	DF	ESP	Íñigo Morte
6	MF	ESP	Ander Cubillas
7	FW	ESP	Juan Losantos
8	MF	ESP	Juanlu Cisneros
9	DF	ESP	Borja Aizpún
10	FW	ESP	Jaime Dios
11	DF	ESP	Asier Goñi
12	FW	ESP	Martin Pedroarena

No.	Pos.	Nation	Player
13	DF	ESP	Asier Pérez
14	DF	ESP	Borja Biesa
15	DF	ESP	Aritz Gil
16	DF	ESP	Javier Ursúa
17	FW	ESP	Jorge Pérez
18	MF	ESP	Iñaki Telletxea
19	FW	ESP	Garat Arano
20	MF	ESP	Iñaki Araque
21	MF	ESP	Unai Ayensa
22	MF	ESP	Mario Pascal
25	GK	ESP	Mikel Ojer

== See also ==
- Category:UD Mutilvera players
