= 2003–04 Tercera División =

Soccer championship

Tercera División
- Season: 2003–04
- Dates: August 2003–June 2004
- Matches played: 12,920

The Spanish Tercera División 2003–04 started in August 2003 and ended in June 2004 with the promotion play-off finals.

== Classification ==
=== Grupo I ===
Pos	Team	Pld	W	D	L	GF	GA	GD	Pts
1	CCD Cerceda	38	21	13	4	65	31	+34	76
2	Atlético Arteixo	38	21	10	7	70	35	+35	73
3	Deportivo de La Coruña B	38	20	11	7	65	37	+28	71
4	Verín CF	38	19	11	8	56	37	+19	68
5	CD Lalín	38	19	8	11	49	34	+15	65
6	CD Lugo	38	16	16	6	60	41	+19	64
7	SD Compostela B	38	16	9	13	39	37	+2	57
8	Porriño Industrial FC	38	14	14	10	48	40	+8	56
9	Coruxo CF	38	13	11	14	44	50	−6	50
10	Bergantiños CF	38	13	9	16	47	48	−1	48
11	Feiraco SD Negreira	38	12	11	15	34	42	−8	47
12	Betanzos CF	38	11	13	14	41	43	−2	46
13	CD Grove	38	11	12	15	53	56	−3	45
14	Rápido de Bouzas	38	10	14	14	43	47	−4	44
15	Portonovo SD	38	11	11	16	34	48	−14	44
16	Arousa SC	38	12	5	21	41	56	−15	41
17	Narón BP	38	9	10	19	44	68	−24	37
18	Ponte Ourense CF	38	9	9	20	42	72	−30	36
19	Sporting Guardés	38	9	8	21	34	59	−25	35
20	UD Xove Lago	38	7	9	22	33	61	−28	30

=== Grupo II ===
Pos	Team	Pld	W	D	L	GF	GA	GD	Pts
1	Real Oviedo	38	27	9	2	70	17	+53	90
2	Oviedo ACF	38	24	8	6	81	32	+49	80
3	Sporting de Gijón B	38	22	12	4	77	30	+47	78
4	Marino	38	20	9	9	63	32	+31	69
5	Langreo	38	18	11	9	57	33	+24	65
6	Universidad	38	18	6	14	50	44	+6	60
7	CD Lealtad	38	14	17	7	64	43	+21	59
8	Real Titánico	38	17	8	13	52	43	+9	59
9	Ribadesella	38	16	7	15	44	46	−2	55
10	Ceares	38	13	13	12	41	45	−4	52
11	Gijón Industrial	38	14	8	16	40	57	−17	50
12	Llanes	38	9	18	11	45	56	−11	45
13	San Martín	38	11	12	15	39	55	−16	45
14	Siero	38	10	13	15	29	39	−10	43
15	Mosconia	38	9	12	17	40	59	−19	39
16	Hispano	38	9	10	19	28	54	−26	37
17	Pumarín	38	9	8	21	30	58	−28	35
18	Condal	38	7	10	21	28	54	−26	31
19	Navia	38	4	10	24	37	66	−29	22
20	Lenense	38	5	7	26	27	79	−52	22

=== Grupo III ===
Pos	Team	Pld	W	D	L	GF	GA	GD	Pts
1	S.D. Noja	38	24	6	8	75	32	+43	78
2	C.D. Tropezón	38	22	10	6	62	32	+30	76
3	C.D. Bezana	38	19	13	6	76	37	+39	70
4	Velarde C.F.	38	17	15	6	69	42	+27	66
5	C.D. Laredo	38	17	11	10	50	31	+19	62
6	Dep. Rayo Cantabria	38	17	8	13	60	42	+18	59
7	S.D. Reocín	38	16	8	14	56	55	+1	56
8	C.F. Ribamontán	38	15	8	15	47	43	+4	53
9	U.M. Escobedo	38	13	11	14	51	43	+8	50
10	Vimenor C.F.	38	14	8	16	48	64	−16	50
11	Cult. D. Guarnizo	38	12	12	14	44	48	−4	48
12	S.D. Barreda Balompié	38	12	12	14	52	52	0	48
13	A.D. Siete Villas	38	12	8	18	54	66	−12	44
14	C.At. Deva	38	11	9	18	41	58	−17	42
15	S.D. Textil Escudo	38	8	18	12	29	45	−16	42
16	S.D.At. Albericia	38	9	14	15	33	54	−21	41
17	Castro C.F.	38	9	13	16	39	55	−16	40
18	C.D. Comillas	38	9	11	18	37	67	−30	38
19	C.D. Pontejos	38	8	12	18	27	58	−31	36
20	C.D. Cayón	38	5	15	18	42	68	−26	30

=== Grupo IV ===
Pos	Team	Pld	W	D	L	GF	GA	GD	Pts
1	Sestao River Club	38	21	15	2	62	24	+38	78
2	S.D. Lemona	38	21	13	4	68	26	+42	76
3	C.D. Baskonia	38	19	14	5	64	32	+32	71
4	S.D. Éibar B	38	20	10	8	43	25	+18	70
5	C.F. Portugalete	38	19	12	7	63	38	+25	69
6	S.D. Beasaín	38	18	11	9	42	35	+7	65
7	Zalla U.C.	38	15	13	10	39	32	+7	58
8	S.D. Gernika C.	38	14	13	11	37	27	+10	55
9	Indautxu S.D.	38	13	11	14	37	48	−11	50
10	Arenas C. Getxo	38	12	12	14	35	42	−7	48
11	Zamudio S.D.	38	13	9	16	45	46	−1	48
12	C.D. Aurrerá Vit.	38	11	15	12	31	33	−2	48
13	S.D. Amorebieta	38	12	11	15	34	40	−6	47
14	C.D. Lagún Onak	38	12	11	15	34	32	+2	47
15	C.D. Aurrerá Ond.	38	10	9	19	36	55	−19	39
16	C. Dep. Alavés C	38	9	10	19	38	56	−18	37
17	C.D. Llodio Salleko	38	10	6	22	31	57	−26	36
18	C.D. Pasajes	38	9	8	21	38	59	−21	35
19	Universidad P.V.	38	7	6	25	31	69	−38	27
20	Club Bermeo	38	6	9	23	35	67	−32	27

=== Grupo V ===
Pos	Team	Pld	W	D	L	GF	GA	GD	Pts
1	C.F. Badalona	38	20	13	5	60	32	+28	73
2	C.F. Reus Dep.	38	21	8	9	74	33	+41	71
3	C.D. L'Hospitalet	38	21	6	11	64	47	+17	69
4	E.C. Granollers	38	19	11	8	57	43	+14	68
5	C.F. Vilanova	38	19	10	9	56	38	+18	67
6	C.F. Gavà	38	19	6	13	61	42	+19	63
7	U.D. Castelldefels	38	19	6	13	55	43	+12	63
8	U.E. Sant Andreu	38	13	12	13	47	44	+3	51
9	F.C. Barcelona C	38	13	12	13	48	52	−4	51
10	U.E. Cornellà	38	15	5	18	49	51	−2	50
11	F.E. Figueres	38	13	9	16	50	53	−3	48
12	C.E. Banyoles	38	13	9	16	47	53	−6	48
13	U.E. Tàrrega	38	12	11	15	55	51	+4	47
14	C.E. Manresa	38	13	8	17	50	71	−21	47
15	C.F. Peralada	38	12	8	18	41	53	−12	44
16	U.E. Vilassar Mar	38	11	9	18	34	54	−20	42
17	C.D. Europa	38	10	12	16	42	56	−14	42
18	C.F. Palafrugell	38	9	14	15	43	55	−12	41
19	A.E.C. Manlleu	38	9	10	19	43	59	−16	37
20	U.D.At. Gramenet B	38	6	7	25	36	82	−46	25

=== Grupo VI ===
Pos	Team	Pld	W	D	L	GF	GA	GD	Pts
1	Benidorm C.D.	38	20	11	7	68	29	+39	71
2	C.D. Alcoyano	38	18	13	7	62	39	+23	67
3	Villarreal C.F. B	38	19	8	11	43	36	+7	65
4	Levante U.D. B	38	18	10	10	69	35	+34	64
5	C.D. Onda	38	16	16	6	59	43	+16	64
6	Ontinyent C.F.	38	17	10	11	45	37	+8	61
7	Valencia C.F. C	38	16	12	10	37	35	+2	60
8	C.D. Eldense	38	16	10	12	49	44	+5	58
9	Santa Pola C.F.	38	15	11	12	39	38	+1	56
10	C.D. Denia	38	14	11	13	44	40	+4	53
11	Torrellano C.F.	38	14	11	13	47	46	+1	53
12	C.D. Burriana	38	14	10	14	54	63	−9	52
13	Elche C.F. B	38	13	10	15	52	59	−7	49
14	Pego C.F.	38	12	9	17	45	51	−6	45
15	U.D. Oliva	38	8	16	14	46	51	−5	40
16	C.F. Gandía	38	10	8	20	41	58	−17	38
17	Burjassot C.F.	38	8	13	17	35	51	−16	37
18	C.D. Buñol	38	9	8	21	46	73	−27	35
19	C.D. Castellón B	38	6	15	17	33	54	−21	33
20	Hércules C.F. B	38	6	10	22	35	67	−32	28

=== Grupo VII ===
Pos	Team	Pld	W	D	L	GF	GA	GD	Pts
1	CD Móstoles	38	21	8	9	64	31	+33	71
2	S.A.D. Pegaso T.C.	38	18	14	6	55	36	+19	68
3	C.At. Pinto	38	19	11	8	72	34	+38	68
4	C.D. Art. Navalcarnero	38	16	18	4	55	34	+21	66
5	C.D. Las Rozas	38	18	12	8	44	31	+13	66
6	A.D. Torrejón C.F.	38	19	6	13	72	53	+19	63
7	C.D. San Fernando H.	38	16	11	11	50	46	+4	59
8	C.D. Ciempozuelos	38	15	11	12	54	52	+2	56
9	Rayo Vallecano B	38	14	12	12	51	46	+5	54
10	A.D. Parla	38	13	14	11	55	49	+6	53
11	D.A.V. Santa Ana	38	12	14	12	49	51	−2	50
12	C.D. Leganés B	38	12	14	12	52	49	+3	50
13	C. At. Aviación	38	11	15	12	56	55	+1	48
14	Real Madrid C.F. C	38	12	11	15	48	44	+4	47
15	Real Aranjuez C.F.	38	14	5	19	59	60	−1	47
16	A.D. Orcasitas	38	11	13	14	40	46	−6	46
17	Fund. Tornado T.C.	38	12	8	18	40	64	−24	44
18	C.D. Coslada	38	7	9	22	34	67	−33	30
19	R.C.D. Carabanchel	38	6	6	26	34	85	−51	24
20	C.D. Puerta Bonita	38	4	8	26	30	81	−51	20

=== Grupo VIII ===
Pos	Team	Pld	W	D	L	GF	GA	GD	Pts
1	S.D. Gim. Segoviana	38	24	6	8	88	44	+44	78
2	Norma S.L. FC	38	20	13	5	58	30	+28	73
3	C.D. Guijuelo	38	19	12	7	62	27	+35	69
4	Real Ávila C.F.	38	20	8	10	66	31	+35	68
5	C.F. Prom. Ponferrada	38	18	14	6	51	29	+22	68
6	Real Valladolid C.F. B	38	18	10	10	61	33	+28	64
7	U.D. Salamanca B	38	17	11	10	49	32	+17	62
8	Cult. Dep. Leonesa B	38	16	8	14	46	53	−7	56
9	At. Tordesillas	38	14	11	13	35	39	−4	53
10	La Bañeza F.C.	38	12	14	12	36	45	−9	50
11	C.D. Numancia B	38	12	12	14	49	43	+6	48
12	C.D. Benavente	38	14	6	18	46	65	−19	48
13	C.D. Becerril	38	11	13	14	44	47	−3	46
14	S.D. Almazán	38	10	15	13	41	45	−4	45
15	S.D. Hullera VL.	38	11	11	16	31	46	−15	44
16	S.D. Gim. Medinense	38	12	7	19	43	65	−22	43
17	Arandina C.F.	38	10	11	17	48	65	−17	41
18	C.At. Bembibre	38	11	7	20	41	61	−20	40
19	U.D. Santa Marta	38	6	7	25	25	67	−42	25
20	Sporting C. Uxama	38	4	6	28	40	93	−53	18

=== Grupo IX ===
Pos	Team	Pld	W	D	L	GF	GA	GD	Pts
1	Granada CF	40	22	12	6	63	27	+36	78
2	Motril CF	40	22	11	7	65	48	+17	77
3	CP Granada 74	40	20	14	6	73	45	+28	74
4	Arenas CD	40	22	8	10	66	42	+24	74
5	CD Alhaurino	40	21	9	10	80	45	+35	72
6	Real UD Carolinense	40	19	14	7	61	36	+25	71
7	CD Baza	40	17	13	10	54	31	+23	64
8	CD Comarca de Níjar	40	17	13	10	57	43	+14	64
9	UD Almería B	40	14	13	13	44	47	−3	55
10	Loja CD	40	14	12	14	45	56	−11	54
11	CD Roquetas	40	11	18	11	42	46	−4	51
12	Úbeda CF	40	12	14	14	55	56	−1	50
13	Torredonjimeno CF	40	13	10	17	64	65	−1	49
14	Guadix CF	40	12	13	15	34	42	−8	49
15	Atlético Mancha Real	40	11	12	17	34	43	−9	45
16	CD Vera	40	10	15	15	42	52	−10	45
17	CD Santa Fe	40	11	11	18	37	57	−20	44
18	UD San Pedro	40	9	13	18	43	65	−22	40
19	Martos CD	40	6	15	19	33	55	−22	33
20	Vandalia Industrial	40	5	12	23	31	61	−30	27
21	Antequera CF	40	3	6	31	37	98	−61	15

=== Grupo X ===
Pos	Team	Pld	W	D	L	GF	GA	GD	Pts
1	CD Alcalá	38	20	10	8	48	24	+24	70
2	Bollullos CF	38	17	16	5	59	35	+24	67
3	RB Linense	38	19	10	9	48	30	+18	67
4	CD San Fernando	38	20	6	12	69	42	+27	66
5	CD Villanueva	38	18	9	11	70	39	+31	63
6	Jerez Industrial	38	16	13	9	48	37	+11	61
7	Coria	38	16	13	9	52	35	+17	61
8	Los Barrios	38	14	11	13	44	44	0	53
9	Atlético Sanluqueño	38	14	10	14	51	54	−3	52
10	Chiclana	38	13	13	12	33	43	−10	52
11	Lucentino	38	12	14	12	41	55	−14	50
12	Dos Hermanas	38	13	10	15	50	49	+1	49
13	Atlético Antoniano	38	11	13	14	50	54	−4	46
14	Portuense	38	11	12	15	45	52	−7	45
15	Cartaya	38	12	6	20	39	59	−20	42
16	AD Cerro Águila	38	12	6	20	42	62	−20	42
17	Recreativo CD Nueva Sevilla	38	11	9	18	36	57	−21	42
18	Córdoba CF B	38	10	9	19	45	54	−9	39
19	Serrallo CF	38	10	8	20	43	66	−23	38
20	Montilla CF	38	7	10	21	38	60	−22	31

=== Grupo XI ===
Pos	Team	Pld	W	D	L	GF	GA	GD	Pts
1	P.D. Santa Eulalia	38	21	10	7	54	30	+24	73
2	C.D. Santanyí	38	18	13	7	60	35	+25	67
3	U.D. Poblense	38	19	9	10	57	47	+10	66
4	C.F. Villafranca	38	20	6	12	65	42	+23	66
5	S.D. Eivissa	38	16	12	10	70	38	+32	60
6	C.D. Constancia	38	15	14	9	50	35	+15	59
7	C.D. Montuiri	38	15	10	13	47	50	−3	55
8	CF Sóller	38	16	6	16	61	64	−3	54
9	CD Atlético Baleares	38	14	10	14	45	48	−3	52
10	C.D. Binisalem	38	14	9	15	40	43	−3	51
11	U.D. Collerense	38	14	8	16	45	53	−8	50
12	C.D. Manacor	38	14	8	16	50	53	−3	50
13	C.D. Ferriolense	38	12	14	12	63	58	+5	50
14	C.E. Platges Calvià	38	13	8	17	40	51	−11	47
15	U.D. Arenal	38	12	11	15	48	54	−6	47
16	C.F. Sporting Mahonés	38	12	9	17	39	52	−13	45
17	C.E. Alaior	38	10	12	16	51	66	−15	42
18	U.D. Alcudia	38	10	10	18	35	61	−26	40
19	C.D. Cardessar	38	9	10	19	48	67	−19	37
20	Recr. C.D. Santa Ponsa	38	3	17	18	35	56	−21	26

=== Grupo XII ===
Pos	Team	Pld	W	D	L	GF	GA	GD	Pts
1	Castillo C.F.	38	20	13	5	59	24	+35	73
2	C.D. Villa Santa Brígida	38	19	13	6	54	33	+21	70
3	A.D. Laguna	38	19	11	8	59	30	+29	68
4	S.D. Tenisca	38	18	11	9	52	39	+13	65
5	U.D. Gáldar	38	18	7	13	58	44	+14	61
6	C.D. San Isidro	38	16	8	14	52	43	+9	56
7	U.D. Las Zocas	38	16	8	14	51	49	+2	56
8	U.D. Las Palmas B	38	14	12	12	57	45	+12	54
9	C.D. La Oliva	38	13	14	11	33	28	+5	53
10	C.D. Teguise	38	14	11	13	53	53	0	53
11	C.D. Orientación Marítima	38	14	10	14	57	47	+10	52
12	U.D. Realejos	38	14	7	17	50	61	−11	49
13	Unión Antigua	38	13	9	16	46	58	−12	48
14	U.D. Tenerife Sur Ibarra	38	12	11	15	46	61	−15	47
15	Univ. L.P. C.F. B	38	13	7	18	54	59	−5	46
16	C.D. Mensajero	38	12	10	16	40	49	−9	46
17	U.D. Telde	38	10	16	12	37	43	−6	46
18	C.D. Tenerife B	38	11	10	17	47	51	−4	43
19	C.D. Victoria	38	7	11	20	40	66	−26	32
20	C.D. San Miguel	38	7	1	30	34	96	−62	22

=== Grupo XIII ===
Pos	Team	Pld	W	D	L	GF	GA	GD	Pts
1	A.D. Mar Menor	38	27	9	2	95	28	+67	90
2	Mazarrón C.F.	38	23	8	7	82	34	+48	77
3	U.D. Horadada	38	22	11	5	77	39	+38	77
4	Caravaca C.F.	38	24	5	9	67	40	+27	77
5	Orihuela C.F.	38	21	12	5	73	38	+35	75
6	Águilas C.F.	38	18	9	11	67	51	+16	63
7	Real Murcia C.F. B	38	18	9	11	66	55	+11	63
8	Calasparra C.F.	38	17	7	14	67	57	+10	58
9	Pinatar C.F. - E.M.F	38	14	12	12	62	61	+1	54
10	Sangonera At. C.F.	38	14	11	13	46	42	+4	53
11	Jumilla C.F.	38	12	10	16	59	64	−5	46
12	Centro Dep. Balsicas	38	13	3	22	47	76	−29	42
13	A.D. Relesa Las Palas	38	12	6	20	45	60	−15	42
14	C.D. Molinense	38	10	12	16	46	52	−6	42
15	C.D. Bala Azul	38	10	10	18	46	55	−9	40
16	UCAM	38	9	13	16	48	54	−6	40
17	DITT Abarán C.F.	38	10	10	18	40	71	−31	40
18	C.D. Dolores	38	9	12	17	42	59	−17	39
19	Muleño C.F.	38	5	3	30	18	92	−74	18
20	C.D. Lumbreras	38	4	4	30	23	88	−65	16

=== Grupo XIV ===
Pos	Team	Pld	W	D	L	GF	GA	GD	Pts
1	C.D. Don Benito	38	26	9	3	83	16	+67	87
2	C.D. Díter Zafra	38	23	9	6	67	25	+42	78
3	A.D. Cerro Reyes At.	38	22	11	5	73	27	+46	77
4	U.P. Plasencia	38	21	12	5	63	35	+28	75
5	C.D. Badajoz B	38	17	12	9	49	29	+20	63
6	C.D. Santa Amalia	38	17	11	10	57	38	+19	62
7	C.F. Extremadura B	38	18	7	13	60	58	+2	61
8	Sporting Villanueva	38	17	8	13	52	41	+11	59
9	C.P. Cacereño B	38	16	7	15	49	51	−2	55
10	C.D. Grabasa Burguillos	38	14	10	14	56	58	−2	52
11	C.D. Coria	38	15	5	18	58	69	−11	50
12	Moralo C.P.	38	13	8	17	48	43	+5	47
13	S.P. Villafranca	38	13	8	17	39	43	−4	47
14	U. Cult. La Estrella	38	12	7	19	29	50	−21	43
15	C.P. Amanecer	38	11	8	19	33	58	−25	41
16	Arroyo C.P.	38	10	11	17	37	58	−21	41
17	C.P. Monesterio	38	10	8	20	38	75	−37	38
18	C.P. Alburquerque	38	9	7	22	37	61	−24	34
19	U.D. Montijo	38	6	9	23	27	62	−35	27
20	A.D. Ciudad Plasencia	38	4	5	29	33	91	−58	17

=== Grupo XV ===
Pos	Team	Pld	W	D	L	GF	GA	GD	Pts
1	C.M. Peralta	40	30	6	4	94	26	+68	96
2	C.D. Valle Egüés	40	20	14	6	66	39	+27	74
3	U.C.D. Burladés	40	22	6	12	70	39	+31	72
4	C. Haro Dep.	40	20	10	10	51	39	+12	70
5	U.D. Mutilvera	40	19	12	9	59	26	+33	69
6	C.D. Tudelano	40	15	15	10	55	41	+14	60
7	C.D. Iruña	40	18	5	17	49	51	−2	59
8	C.D. Oberena	40	16	11	13	62	53	+9	59
9	C.D. Izarra	40	15	13	12	56	46	+10	58
10	C.D. Aluvión	40	18	4	18	63	63	0	58
11	C.D. Aoiz	40	14	12	14	40	52	−12	54
12	U.D. Cult. Chantrea	40	13	14	13	52	52	0	53
13	C.D. Varea	40	13	13	14	50	47	+3	52
14	C.D. Huarte	40	14	10	16	45	57	−12	52
15	C.D. Urroztarra	40	12	9	19	47	60	−13	45
16	C.D. San Marcial	40	12	7	21	41	69	−28	43
17	C.D. Pradejón	40	10	10	20	42	71	−29	40
18	Murchante F.C.	40	9	13	18	32	62	−30	40
19	C.D. Lourdes	40	9	11	20	39	71	−32	38
20	C.D. Agoncillo	40	9	6	25	41	62	−21	33
21	C.D. Alberite	40	10	3	27	32	60	−28	33

=== Grupo XVI ===
Pos	Team	Pld	W	D	L	GF	GA	GD	Pts
1	Utebo F.C.	38	26	9	3	87	34	+53	87
2	C.D. Binéfar	38	23	7	8	67	34	+33	76
3	Andorra C.F.	38	20	13	5	62	35	+27	73
4	S.D. Huesca	38	19	16	3	69	28	+41	73
5	U.D. Fraga	38	22	7	9	65	37	+28	73
6	U.D. Barbastro	38	20	8	10	60	32	+28	68
7	Univ. Zaragoza	38	20	8	10	70	37	+33	68
8	C. At. Monzón	38	16	12	10	50	37	+13	60
9	C.D. Teruel	38	15	8	15	53	49	+4	53
10	C.D. Sariñena	38	13	11	14	49	47	+2	50
11	C.D. Zuera	38	11	12	15	40	42	−2	45
12	C.D. Ebro	38	12	9	17	50	64	−14	45
13	A.D. Sabiñánigo	38	9	15	14	39	53	−14	42
14	C.D. Alagón	38	9	12	17	49	68	−19	39
15	U.D. La Fueva	38	10	7	21	48	78	−30	37
16	At. Calatayud C.F.	38	10	6	22	33	59	−26	36
17	C.D. Mallén	38	8	10	20	28	68	−40	34
18	Santa Isabel R.S.D.	38	9	7	22	37	77	−40	34
19	C.D. Fuentes	38	7	6	25	43	72	−29	27
20	C.At. Monzalbarba	38	5	9	24	27	75	−48	24

=== Grupo XVII ===
Pos	Team	Pld	W	D	L	GF	GA	GD	Pts
1	C.D. Quintanar Rey	38	21	9	8	51	28	+23	72
2	U.D. Puertollano	38	20	12	6	45	22	+23	72
3	C. Hellín Dep.	38	20	11	7	47	24	+23	71
4	La Roda Caja Rural C.F.	38	20	11	7	54	26	+28	71
5	C.D. Guadalajara	38	18	15	5	55	28	+27	69
6	U.D. Almansa	38	19	10	9	55	27	+28	67
7	C.F. Gim. Alcázar	38	19	9	10	49	36	+13	66
8	C.P. Villarrobledo	38	17	7	14	65	53	+12	58
9	Albacete Balompié B	38	16	7	15	58	50	+8	55
10	U.D. Socuéllamos	38	14	9	15	42	46	−4	51
11	A.D. Torpedo 66 C.F.	38	12	12	14	32	33	−1	48
12	C.F. La Solana	38	14	5	19	29	49	−20	47
13	C.D. Cuenca	38	12	10	16	57	57	0	46
14	U.B. Conquense B	38	12	8	18	35	49	−14	44
15	Manchego C.F.	38	11	9	18	41	59	−18	42
16	C.D. Torrijos	38	9	14	15	37	45	−8	41
17	Manzanares C.F.	38	10	7	21	37	68	−31	37
18	CD Sigüenza	38	9	8	21	38	60	−22	35
19	C.D. Toledo B	38	7	6	25	31	62	−31	27
20	Sporting Cabanillas F.C.	38	6	9	23	33	69	−36	27
