= SD Balmaseda FC =

Association football club in Spain

Coordinates: 43.184548°N 3.204193°W

Balmaseda
- Full name: Sociedad Deportiva Balmaseda Fútbol Club
- Founded: 2 August 1914; 112 years ago
- Ground: La Baluga, Balmaseda, Biscay, Basque Country, Spain
- Capacity: 1,500
- President: Manuel Escobedo
- Head coach: David del Horno
- League: División de Honor
- 2025–26: División de Honor, 10th of 18
Home colours	Away colours

Sociedad Deportiva Balmaseda Fútbol Club is a Spanish football team based in Balmaseda, Biscay, in the autonomous community of Basque Country. Founded on 2 August 1914 it currently plays in División de Honor, holding home games at La Baluga, which has a capacity of 1,500 spectators.

== History ==
Sociedad Deportiva Balmaseda Fútbol Club was founded on 2 August 1914. On the same day the team debuted against Getxo Arenas Club reserve team in the Campo del Nocedal.

=== Club background ===
- Valmaseda Fútbol Club (1914–1933)
- Sociedad Deportiva Valmaseda Club de Fútbol (1948–1982)
- Sociedad Deportiva Balmaseda Club de Fútbol (1982–2011)
- Sociedad Deportiva Balmaseda Fútbol Club (2011–)

== Season to season ==
Season	Tier	Division	Place	Copa del Rey
1948–49	5	2ª Reg.	8th	
1949–50	6	3ª Reg.	2nd	
1950–51	6	3ª Reg.	1st	
1951–52	5	2ª Reg.	1st	
1952–53	4	1ª Reg.	6th	
1953–54	4	1ª Reg.	6th	
1954–55	4	1ª Reg.	4th	
1955–56	3	3ª	8th	
1956–57	3	3ª	8th	
1957–58	3	3ª	6th	
1958–59	3	3ª	14th	
1959–60	4	1ª Reg.	1st	
1960–61	3	3ª	15th	
1961–62	4	1ª Reg.	2nd	
1962–63	4	1ª Reg.	4th	
1963–64	4	1ª Reg.	12th	
1964–65	4	1ª Reg.	11th	
1965–66	4	1ª Reg.	6th	
1966–67	4	1ª Reg.	13th	
1967–68	4	1ª Reg.	1st	

Season	Tier	Division	Place	Copa del Rey
1968–69	4	Reg. Pref.	1st	
1969–70	4	Reg. Pref.	1st	
1970–71	4	Reg. Pref.	5th	
1971–72	4	Reg. Pref.	15th	
1972–73	4	Reg. Pref.	8th	
1973–74	4	Reg. Pref.	8th	
1974–75	4	Reg. Pref.	3rd	
1975–76	4	Reg. Pref.	6th	
1976–77	4	Reg. Pref.	1st	
1977–78	4	3ª	14th	First round
1978–79	4	3ª	9th	Second round
1979–80	4	3ª	7th	First round
1980–81	4	3ª	7th	First round
1981–82	4	3ª	19th	
1982–83	5	Reg. Pref.	7th	
1983–84	5	Reg. Pref.	2nd	
1984–85	5	Reg. Pref.	3rd	
1985–86	5	Reg. Pref.	17th	
1986–87	5	Reg. Pref.	16th	
1987–88	5	Reg. Pref.	3rd	

Season	Tier	Division	Place	Copa del Rey
1988–89	5	Reg. Pref.	14th	
1989–90	5	Reg. Pref.	7th	
1990–91	5	Terr. Pref.	11th	
1991–92	5	Terr. Pref.	4th	
1992–93	5	Terr. Pref.	1st	
1993–94	4	3ª	13th	
1994–95	4	3ª	5th	
1995–96	4	3ª	15th	
1996–97	4	3ª	19th	
1997–98	5	Terr. Pref.	7th	
1998–99	5	Terr. Pref.	4th	
1999–2000	5	Terr. Pref.	7th	
2000–01	5	Terr. Pref.	11th	
2001–02	5	Terr. Pref.	16th	
2002–03	6	Pref.	1st	
2003–04	5	Div. Hon.	18th	
2004–05	6	Pref.	4th	
2005–06	6	Pref.	10th	
2006–07	6	Pref.	2nd	
2007–08	5	Div. Hon.	14th	

Season	Tier	Division	Place	Copa del Rey
2008–09	5	Div. Hon.	2nd	
2009–10	5	Div. Hon.	9th	
2010–11	5	Div. Hon.	1st	
2011–12	4	3ª	16th	
2012–13	4	3ª	17th	
2013–14	4	3ª	9th	
2014–15	4	3ª	9th	
2015–16	4	3ª	4th	
2016–17	4	3ª	9th	
2017–18	4	3ª	9th	
2018–19	4	3ª	5th	
2019–20	4	3ª	12th	
2020–21	4	3ª	9th / 6th	
2021–22	6	Div. Hon.	4th	
2022–23	6	Div. Hon.	11th	
2023–24	6	Div. Hon.	14th	
2024–25	6	Div. Hon.	4th	
2025–26	6	Div. Hon.	10th	
2026–27	6	Div. Hon.		

- 24 seasons in Tercera División

== Honours ==
- División de Honor: 2010–11
