= CD Choco =

Association football club in Spain

Coordinates: 42.291603°N 8.609183°W

Choco
- Full name: Club Deportivo Choco de Redondela
- Founded: 1953; 73 years ago
- Stadium: Campo Municipal de Santa Mariña
- Capacity: 2,000
- President: Virginia Ricón
- Head coach: Fernando Boubeta Del Río
- League: Primera Futgal – Group 6
- 2025–26: Preferente Futgal – Group 2, 15th of 18 (relegated)
Home colours

Club Deportivo Choco de Redondela is a Spanish football club based in Redondela, province of Pontevedra, Galicia, Spain. Founded in 1953, the team currently plays in Primera Futgal – Group 6. The club's home ground is Campo Municipal de Santa Mariña.

== Season to season ==
Former CD Choco logo

Season	Tier	Division	Place	Copa del Rey
1954–55	5	1ª Reg.	6th	
1955–56	4	Serie A	7th	
1956–57	4	Serie A	1st	
1957–58	4	Serie A	2nd	
1958–59	4	Serie A	4th	
1959–60	4	Serie A	2nd	
1960–61	3	3ª	8th	
1961–62	3	3ª	15th	
1962–63	4	Serie A	1st	
1963–64	3	3ª	9th	
1964–65	3	3ª	7th	
1965–66	3	3ª	16th	
1966–67	4	Serie A	4th	
1967–68	4	Serie A	2nd	
1968–69	4	Serie A	5th	
1969–70	4	Serie A	5th	
1970–71	4	Serie A	6th	
1971–72	4	Serie A	14th	
1972–73	4	Serie A	16th	
1973–74	4	Serie A	20th	

Season	Tier	Division	Place	Copa del Rey
1974–75	5	1ª Reg.	8th	
1975–76	5	1ª Reg.	3rd	
1976–77	5	1ª Reg.	3rd	
1977–78	6	1ª Reg.	1st	
1978–79	5	Reg. Pref.	5th	
1979–80	5	Reg. Pref.	5th	
1980–81	4	3ª	17th	
1981–82	5	Reg. Pref.	12th	
1982–83	5	Reg. Pref.	17th	
1983–84	5	Reg. Pref.	11th	
1984–85	5	Reg. Pref.	13th	
1985–86	5	Reg. Pref.	10th	
1986–87	5	Reg. Pref.	6th	
1987–88	5	Reg. Pref.	13th	
1988–89	5	Reg. Pref.	18th	
1989–90	6	1ª Reg.	2nd	
1990–91	6	1ª Reg.	11th	
1991–92	7	2ª Reg.	1st	
1992–93	6	1ª Reg.	13th	
1993–94	6	1ª Reg.	16th	

Season	Tier	Division	Place	Copa del Rey
1994–95	7	2ª Reg.	3rd	
1995–96	7	2ª Reg.	1st	
1996–97	6	1ª Reg.	3rd	
1997–98	6	1ª Reg.	3rd	
1998–99	6	1ª Reg.	2nd	
1999–2000	5	Reg. Pref.	18th	
2000–01	6	1ª Reg.	8th	
2001–02	6	1ª Reg.	12th	
2002–03	6	1ª Reg.	1st	
2003–04	5	Reg. Pref.	10th	
2004–05	5	Reg. Pref.	5th	
2005–06	5	Reg. Pref.	6th	
2006–07	5	Pref. Aut.	8th	
2007–08	5	Pref. Aut.	4th	
2008–09	5	Pref. Aut.	9th	
2009–10	5	Pref. Aut.	3rd	
2010–11	5	Pref. Aut.	9th	
2011–12	5	Pref. Aut.	3rd	
2012–13	5	Pref. Aut.	2nd	
2013–14	4	3ª	6th	

Season	Tier	Division	Place	Copa del Rey
2014–15	4	3ª	4th	
2015–16	4	3ª	4th	
2016–17	4	3ª	10th	
2017–18	4	3ª	8th	
2018–19	4	3ª	7th	
2019–20	4	3ª	5th	
2020–21	4	3ª	5th / 2nd	
2021–22	5	3ª RFEF	13th	
2022–23	5	3ª Fed.	16th	
2023–24	6	Pref.	3rd	
2024–25	6	Pref. Futgal	15th	
2025–26	6	Pref. Futgal		

- 14 seasons in Tercera División
- 2 seasons in Tercera Federación/Tercera División RFEF
