= Loja CD =

Association football club in Spain

Loja
- Full name: Loja Club Deportivo
- Founded: 1968 (as Loja CF)
- Ground: Medina Lauxa, Loja, Andalusia, Spain
- Capacity: 1,250
- President: Antonio Guardeño
- Head coach: Jesús Párraga
- League: División de Honor – Group 2
- 2024–25: División de Honor – Group 2, 5th of 16
Home colours	Away colours

Loja Club Deportivo is a Spanish football team based in Loja, Granada, in the autonomous community of Andalusia. Founded in 1968 it currently plays in Primera RFEF holding home matches at Estadio Medina Lauxa,with a 6,550-seat capacity.

== History ==
=== Club background ===
- Loja Club de Fútbol (1969–71)
- Club Deportivo Loja (1971–85)
- Loja Club Deportivo (1985–2024)
- Loja Fútbol Club (2024–)

== Season to season ==
Season	Tier	Division	Place	Copa del Rey
1968–69	4	1ª Reg.	1st	
1969–70	4	1ª Reg.	5th	
1970–71	4	1ª Reg.	1st	
1971–72	4	1ª Reg.	8th	
1972–73	4	1ª Reg.	15th	
1973–74	4	1ª Reg.	16th	
1974–75	4	1ª Reg.	11th	
1975–76	5	1ª Reg.	9th	
1976–77	5	1ª Reg.	8th	
1977–78	6	1ª Reg.	1st	
1978–79	5	Reg. Pref.	11th	
1979–80	5	Reg. Pref.	17th	
1980–81	4	3ª	20th	
1981–82	5	Reg. Pref.	2nd	
1982–83	5	Reg. Pref.	2nd	
1983–84	4	3ª	17th	
1984–85	4	3ª	18th	
1985–86	5	Reg. Pref.	10th	
1986–87	5	Reg. Pref.	16th	
1987–88	5	Reg. Pref.	15th	

Season	Tier	Division	Place	Copa del Rey
1988–89	6	1ª Reg.	3rd	
1989–90	5	Reg. Pref.	10th	
1990–91	5	Reg. Pref.	9th	
1991–92	5	Reg. Pref.	7th	
1992–93	5	Reg. Pref.	9th	
1993–94	5	Reg. Pref.	14th	
1994–95	5	Reg. Pref.	16th	
1995–96	6	1ª Reg.	4th	
1996–97	5	Reg. Pref.	2nd	
1997–98	5	Reg. Pref.	4th	
1998–99	5	Reg. Pref.	1st	
1999–2000	4	3ª	12th	
2000–01	4	3ª	10th	
2001–02	4	3ª	15th	
2002–03	4	3ª	6th	
2003–04	4	3ª	10th	
2004–05	4	3ª	17th	
2005–06	4	3ª	15th	
2006–07	4	3ª	17th	
2007–08	4	3ª	17th	

Season	Tier	Division	Place	Copa del Rey
2008–09	4	3ª	9th	
2009–10	4	3ª	9th	
2010–11	4	3ª	3rd	
2011–12	4	3ª	1st	
2012–13	3	2ª B	19th	First round
2013–14	4	3ª	4th	
2014–15	4	3ª	5th	
2015–16	4	3ª	3rd	
2016–17	4	3ª	6th	
2017–18	4	3ª	9th	
2018–19	4	3ª	7th	
2019–20	4	3ª	10th	
2020–21	4	3ª	9th / 5th	
2021–22	6	Div. Hon.	17th	
2022–23	7	1ª And.	2nd	
2023–24	6	Div. Hon.	8th	
2024–25	6	Div. Hon.	5th	
2025–26	6	Div. Hon.		

- 1 season in Segunda División B
- 24 seasons in Tercera División
