= CD Alcalá =

Spanish football club

Alcalá
- Full name: Club Deportivo Alcalá
- Founded: 1945
- Ground: Nuevo Estadio, Alcalá, Andalusia, Spain
- Capacity: 2,261
- President: Lisardo López
- Head coach: Federico Martínez Gamez
- League: Primera Andaluza Sevilla
- 2024–25: Primera Andaluza Sevilla, 4th of 16
- Website: www.clubdeportivoalcala.com
Home colours	Away colours

Club Deportivo Alcalá is a Spanish football team based in Alcalá de Guadaira, in the autonomous community of Andalusia. Founded in 1945 it plays in Primera Andaluza Sevilla, and plays home games at Nuevo Estadio Ciudad de Alcalá, with a capacity of 2,261 seaters. CD Alcala debuted in the Second Division B of Spain's in 2004–05. They got to play 5 years in that division.

== History ==
The club was founded on October 13, 1945, as a result of the efforts by a group of football fans. Among them was Julio Garcia, who was actually the one who founded the club.

In January 2019 Federico Martínez Gamez became the club's new head coach.

== Season to season ==
Season	Tier	Division	Place	Copa del Rey
1944–62	—	Regional	—	
1962–63	4	1ª Reg.	2nd	
1963–64	4	1ª Reg.	3rd	
1964–65	4	1ª Reg.	1st	
1965–66	3	3ª	12th	
1966–67	3	3ª	13th	
1967–68	3	3ª	6th	
1968–69	3	3ª	10th	
1969–70	3	3ª	11th	Second round
1970–71	4	1ª Reg.	6th	
1971–72	4	1ª Reg.	6th	
1972–73	4	1ª Reg.	11th	
1973–74	4	1ª Reg.	14th	
1974–75	4	1ª Reg.	20th	
1975–76	5	1ª Reg.	14th	
1976–77	6	2ª Reg.		
1977–78	6	1ª Reg.		
1978–79	6	1ª Reg.	1st	
1979–80	5	Reg. Pref.	10th	
1980–81	5	Reg. Pref.	1st	

Season	Tier	Division	Place	Copa del Rey
1981–82	4	3ª	17th	
1982–83	4	3ª	12th	
1983–84	4	3ª	18th	
1984–85	5	Reg. Pref.	12th	
1985–86	5	Reg. Pref.	12th	
1986–87	5	Reg. Pref.	4th	
1987–88	5	Reg. Pref.	3rd	
1988–89	5	Reg. Pref.	5th	
1989–90	5	Reg. Pref.	8th	
1990–91	5	Reg. Pref.	12th	
1991–92	5	Reg. Pref.	12th	
1992–93	5	Reg. Pref.	9th	
1993–94	5	Reg. Pref.	3rd	
1994–95	5	Reg. Pref.	1st	
1995–96	5	Reg. Pref.	1st	
1996–97	5	Reg. Pref.	17th	
1997–98	6	1ª Reg.	2nd	
1998–99	5	Reg. Pref.	9th	
1999–2000	5	Reg. Pref.	5th	
2000–01	5	Reg. Pref.	1st	

Season	Tier	Division	Place	Copa del Rey
2001–02	4	3ª	12th	
2002–03	4	3ª	4th	
2003–04	4	3ª	1st	
2004–05	3	2ª B	15th	Second round
2005–06	3	2ª B	8th	
2006–07	3	2ª B	14th	
2007–08	3	2ª B	18th	
2008–09	4	3ª	4th	
2009–10	4	3ª	1st	
2010–11	3	2ª B	17th	Second round
2011–12	4	3ª	7th	
2012–13	4	3ª	7th	
2013–14	4	3ª	3rd	
2014–15	4	3ª	10th	
2015–16	4	3ª	4th	
2016–17	4	3ª	17th	
2017–18	4	3ª	19th	
2018–19	5	Div. Hon.	9th	
2019–20	5	Div. Hon.	16th	
2020–21	5	Div. Hon.	8th	

Season	Tier	Division	Place	Copa del Rey
2021–22	6	Div. Hon.	17th	
2022–23	7	1ª And.	5th	
2023–24	7	1ª And.	5th	
2024–25	7	1ª And.	4th	
2025–26	7	1ª And.		

- 5 seasons in Segunda División B
- 19 seasons in Tercera División
