= Atlético Mancha Real =

Association football club in Spain

- Full name: Atlético Mancha Real
- Nicknames: Manchegos, Verdes (The Greens)
- Founded: 4 August 1984; 42 years ago
- Ground: La Juventud; Mancha Real, Spain
- Capacity: 1,500
- President: Juan de Dios Hermoso
- Head coach: Pedro Bolaños
- League: Tercera Federación – Group 9
- 2025–26: Tercera Federación – Group 9, 14th of 18
- Website: https://www.atmanchareal.es/
Home colours	Away colours

Atlético Mancha Real is a Spanish football team based in Mancha Real in the autonomous community of Andalusia. Founded in 1984, the club competes in Tercera Federación – Group 9, holding home games at Estadio Polideportivo Municipal de La Juventud, with a capacity of 1,500 people.

== History ==
The notarial document about official foundation of Atlético Mancha Real as a sports association was signed on 4 August 1984.

Atlético Mancha Real won its Tercera División group in 2009–10, losing the play-off to CD Badajoz. In doing so, it qualified for the Copa del Rey for the first time, losing 4–1 at AD Ceuta in the opening round.

On 29 May 2016, the club promoted to Segunda División B for the first time, with a 5–1 aggregate win over Zamora CF in the play-off. The following season ended with relegation.

== Season to season ==
Season	Tier	Division	Place	Copa del Rey
1985–86	7	2ª Reg.	7th	
1986–87	7	2ª Reg.	3rd	
1987–88	6	1ª Reg.	11th	
1988–89	6	1ª Reg.	2nd	
1989–90	5	Reg. Pref.	16th	
1990–91	6	1ª Reg.	8th	
1991–92	6	1ª Reg.	3rd	
1992–93	5	Reg. Pref.	7th	
1993–94	5	Reg. Pref.	4th	
1994–95	5	Reg. Pref.	4th	
1995–96	5	Reg. Pref.	4th	
1996–97	5	Reg. Pref.	1st	
1997–98	5	Reg. Pref.	4th	
1998–99	5	Reg. Pref.	1st	
1999–2000	4	3ª	19th	
2000–01	5	Reg. Pref.	2nd	
2001–02	4	3ª	16th	
2002–03	4	3ª	10th	
2003–04	4	3ª	15th	
2004–05	4	3ª	18th	

Season	Tier	Division	Place	Copa del Rey
2005–06	5	1ª And.	8th	
2006–07	5	1ª And.	6th	
2007–08	5	1ª And.	4th	
2008–09	5	1ª And.	1st	
2009–10	4	3ª	1st	
2010–11	4	3ª	11th	First round
2011–12	4	3ª	7th	
2012–13	4	3ª	2nd	
2013–14	4	3ª	5th	
2014–15	4	3ª	10th	
2015–16	4	3ª	1st	
2016–17	3	2ª B	18th	First round
2017–18	4	3ª	8th	
2018–19	4	3ª	8th	
2019–20	4	3ª	11th	
2020–21	4	3ª	1st / 2nd	
2021–22	4	2ª RFEF	10th	Round of 32
2022–23	4	2ª Fed.	17th	
2023–24	5	3ª Fed.	11th	
2024–25	5	3ª Fed.	9th	

Season	Tier	Division	Place	Copa del Rey
2025–26	5	3ª Fed.	14th	
2026–27	5	3ª Fed.		

- 1 season in Segunda División B
- 2 seasons in Segunda Federación/Segunda División RFEF
- 16 seasons in Tercera División
- 4 seasons in Tercera Federación
