= Tercera División =

- Founded: 1929
- Folded: 2021
- Country: Spain
- Confederation: UEFA
- Number of clubs: 397
- Level on pyramid: 3 (1929–1977); 4 (1977–2021)
- Promotion to: Segunda División (1929–1977); Segunda División B (1977–2021)
- Relegation to: Divisiones Regionales
- Domestic cup(s): Copa del Rey; Copa Federación

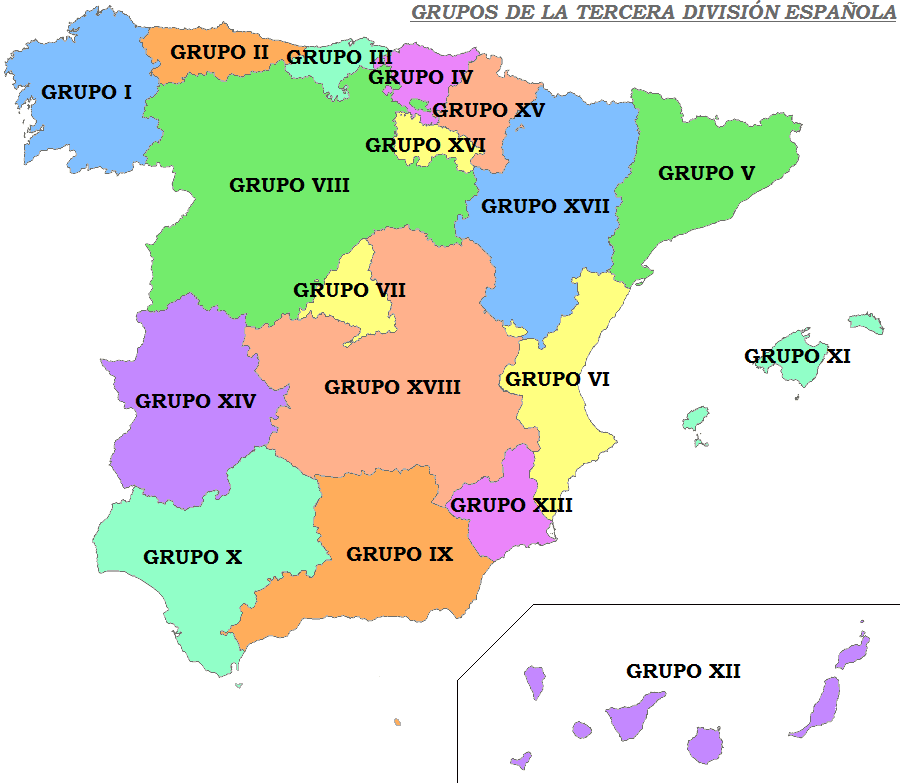
Groups of Tercera División

Tercera División (English: Third Division) was the fourth tier of the Spanish football league system. Until 1977, it was the third tier of the Spanish football league system. Founded in 1929, it was below the Primera División (also known as La Liga), the Segunda División, and the semi-professional Segunda División B.

For the 2021–22 season, Tercera División was replaced by Tercera División RFEF, which became the fifth tier due to the creation of a new, semi-professional third division by the Spanish federation (RFEF) called the Primera División RFEF.

== Format ==
Tercera División featured 360 teams divided into 18 regional groups, corresponding to the autonomous communities of Spain (due to its size, Andalusia is divided into two groups, East and West; Ceuta is allocated to West Andalusia, while Melilla is allocated to the East). Each group was administered by a regional football federation. At the end of the season the first four teams in each group qualified for promotion play-offs to decide which teams were promoted to Segunda División B. At least the three teams finishing bottom of each group were relegated to the Divisiones Regionales de Fútbol. However the number of relegated teams often varied. The eighteen group champions also qualified for the following season's Copa del Rey, of which reserve teams were ineligible. Along with teams from Segunda División B, the remaining teams from the division competed in the Copa Federación.

Until the 2018–19 season, the 18 group winners had the opportunity of direct promotion to the Segunda División B. The group winners are drawn into a two-legged series, after which the nine winners are promoted to the Segunda División B. The nine losing clubs enter the play-off round for the last nine promotion spots.

The 18 runners-up were drawn against one of the 17 fourth-placed clubs outside their group and the 18 third-placed clubs were drawn against one another in a two-legged series. The 27 winners advanced with the nine losing clubs from the champions' series to determine the 18 teams that entered the final two-legged series for the last nine promotion spots. In all the play-off series, the lower-ranked club played at home first. Whenever there was a tie in position (like the group winners in the champions' series or the third-placed teams in the first round), a draw determined the club to play at home first.

In the 2019–20 season, the promotion play-off rules were altered by an RFEF resolution after that season was suspended and later curtailed due to the coronavirus disease pandemic in Spain. Thus, the top four teams in each group at the time of suspension were deemed to qualify for the play-offs, which will be contested on a regional basis at neutral venues. The 18 group winners were drawn against the fourth-place clubs while the 18 runners-up were drawn against the third-place clubs within their groups, all in two-legged series. The 36 first-round winners played single knock-out games in each of their regions, from which 18 were promoted to the Segunda División B. The 18 losing clubs will be able to play additional play-off rounds if possible for the remaining two spots in the third-tier division, which initially expanded to 100 teams divided into five groups of 20 and subdivided into 10 subgroups of 10 teams each, only for 2020–21. However, two more clubs were promoted after the RFEF cancelled the Tercera División repechages without replaying them, thus there are now four groups of 20 and one group of 22, subdivided into eight subgroups of 10 and two subgroups of 11.

Group	Region	Relegation
1	Galicia	Preferente de Galicia
2	Asturias	Preferente de Asturias
3	Cantabria	Preferente de Cantabria
4	Basque Country	Basque lower levels
5	Catalonia and Andorra	Primera Catalana
6	Valencian Community	Preferente Comunidad Valenciana
7	Community of Madrid	Preferente de Madrid
8	Castile and León	Preferente de Castilla y León
9	Eastern Andalusia and Melilla	Primera Eastern Andaluza
10	Western Andalusia and Ceuta	Primera Western Andaluza
11	Balearic Islands	Preferente
12	Canary Islands	Interinsular Preferente
13	Murcia	Preferente de Murcia
14	Extremadura	Preferente de Extremadura
15	Navarre	Preferente de Navarra
16	La Rioja	Preferente de La Rioja
17	Aragon	Preferente de Aragón
18	Castile-La Mancha	Preferente de Castilla-La Mancha

== History ==
During the inaugural La Liga season of 1928–29 a third level of teams known as Segunda División B was also organised. This division featured 10 teams and at the end of the season Cultural y Deportiva Leonesa were crowned champions. However the 1929–30 season saw the first of many reorganisations of the Spanish football league system and the Tercera Division was born. During its first season the division featured 33 teams divided into eight groups. The eight group winners qualified for a play-off and CD Castellón eventually beat Barakaldo CF 3–2 to be declared champions. The most significant reorganisation came at the start of the 1977–78 season with the revival of Segunda División B which replaced the Tercera División as the third level.

On 6 May 2020, the RFEF announced the creation of a new, two-group, 40-team third division called Primera División RFEF, which made the former third and fourth divisions, Segunda División B and Tercera División, respectively, drop down a level and change into Segunda División RFEF and Tercera División RFEF; the changes were made effective for the 2021–22 campaign.

=== Evolution of the Tercera División ===
Tier\Years	1928–50	1950–55	1955–68	1968–70	1970–77	1977–79	1979–80	1980–83	1983–86	1986–87	1987–89	1989–92	1992–04	2004–06	2006–20	2020–21
3	4 to 10 groups	6 groups	14 groups	8 groups	4 groups	Segunda División B										
4	Regional divisions					6 groups	8 groups	13 groups	14 groups	16 groups	17 groups	17 groups +2 subgroups	17 groups	17 groups +2 subgroups	18 groups	18 groups +36 subgroups
5	Regional divisions															

=== Latest group champions and promoted teams ===
In bold, group champions are promoted to Segunda División B. Administrative promotions not included in this table.

Season	I X	II XI	III XII	IV XIII	V XIV	VI XV	VII XVI	VIII XVII	IX XVIII
2006–07	**Deportivo B**	Caudal	Noja	Zalla	Reus	**Dénia**	RSD Alcalá	Mirandés	Granada Atlético
2006–07	**Algeciras**	**Eivissa**	Las Palmas B	Murcia B	Jerez	Valle de Egüés	Haro	Zaragoza B	**Conquense**
2006–07	Other promoted teams: Girona (V), Sabadell (V), Gavà (V), Villarreal B (VI), Ontinyent (VI), Betis B (X), Lucena (X), San Isidro (XII), Villa de Santa Brígida (XII), Fuerteventura (XII), Mazarrón (XIII), Peña Sport (XIV), Guadalajara (XVIII)								
2007–08	**Ciudad de Santiago**	Oviedo	Gimn. Torrelavega	Portugalete	**Barcelona B**	**Alzira**	Ciempozuelos	Mirandés	**Roquetas**
2007–08	**CD San Fernando**	**Atlético Baleares**	Atlético Granadilla	**Ciudad de Lorquí**	Don Benito	Izarra	Alfaro	Ejea	Toledo
2007–08	Other promoted teams: Sporting Gijón B (II), Racing Santander B (III), Sant Andreu (V), Valencia Mestalla (VI), Navalcarnero (VII), Antequera (IX), Linense (X), Peña Deportiva (XI), Las Palmas Atlético (XII), Sangonera (XIII), Murcia B (XIII)								
2008–09	**Compostela**	**Oviedo**	**Gimn. Torrelavega**	Lagun Onak	**Espanyol B**	**Villajoyosa**	**RSD Alcalá**	**CF Palencia**	**Unión Estepona**
2008–09	**San Roque de Lepe**	**Mallorca B**	Tenerife B	**Caravaca**	**Cerro Reyes**	**Izarra**	**Varea**	Atlético Monzón	**Toledo**
2008–09	Other promoted teams: Mirandés (VIII), Sporting Mahonés (XI), Cacereño (XIV)								
2009–10	**Deportivo B**	**Caudal**	Noja	**Real Sociedad B**	**L'Hospitalet**	**Gandía**	**Rayo Vallecano B**	Burgos	At. Mancha Real
2009–10	**Alcalá**	**Atlético Baleares**	Corralejo	**Jumilla CF**	**Badajoz**	Tudelano	Oyonesa	**Teruel**	La Roda
2009–10	Other promoted teams: Coruxo (I), Santboià (V), Alzira (VI), Getafe B (VII), Yeclano (XIII), Extremadura (XIV), Peña Sport (XV), La Muela (XVII)								
2010–11	Cerceda	**Marino Luanco**	Noja	**Amorebieta**	**Llagostera**	**Valencia Mestalla**	Alcobendas Sport	**Burgos**	Comarca de Níjar
2010–11	**Linense**	**Manacor**	Lanzarote	Costa Cálida	**Villanovense**	Tudelano	Náxara	**Andorra**	**Toledo**
2010–11	Other promoted teams: Sestao River (IV), Reus (V), Olímpic (VI), SS Reyes (VII), Gimnástica Segoviana (VIII), Arandina (VIII), Sporting Villanueva (XIV), La Roda (XVIII)								
2011–12	**Ourense**	**Caudal**	**Noja**	Laudio	**Prat**	Catarroja	**Fuenlabrada**	Valladolid B	**Loja**
2011–12	**At. Sanluqueño**	**Constància**	**Marino**	**Yeclano**	**Arroyo**	**Peña Sport**	**SD Logroñés**	Ejea	Villarrobledo
2011–12	Other promoted teams: Barakaldo (IV), San Fernando (X), Binissalem (XI), Izarra (XV), Tudelano (XV)								
2012–13	**Racing Ferrol**	Tuilla	**Tropezón**	**Laudio**	**Olot**	**Elche Ilicitano**	**Puerta Bonita**	**Burgos**	**El Palo**
2012–13	**Algeciras**	Peña Deportiva	**Las Palmas Atlético**	**La Hoya Lorca**	**Extremadura**	San Juan	Haro	**Sariñena**	**Toledo**
2012–13	Other promoted teams: Celta Vigo B (I), Compostela (I), Granada B (IX), Conquense (XVIII)								
2013–14	**Somozas**	**Lealtad**	Gimn. Torrelavega	**Leioa**	**Cornellà**	**Eldense**	**Trival Valderas**	**Valladolid B**	**Marbella**
2013–14	**Real Betis B**	**Mallorca B**	Atlético Granadilla	**UCAM Murcia**	**Villanovense**	Izarra	Varea	**Zaragoza B**	**Puertollano** (Note: Puertollano resigned to promotion due to financial difficulties.)
2013–14	Other promoted teams: Langreo (II), Rayo Vallecano B (VII), Atlético Astorga (VIII), San Roque de Lepe (X), Socuéllamos (XVIII)								
2014–15	**Pontevedra**	Condal	Laredo	**Portugalete**	Ascó	Castellón	**Rayo Majadahonda**	**Arandina**	**Linares**
2014–15	**Algeciras**	Formentera	**Mensajero**	**Jumilla**	**Mérida**	**Peña Sport**	Varea	**Ebro**	**Talavera de la Reina**
2014–15	Other promoted teams: Gernika (IV), Arenas (IV), Pobla de Mafumet (V), Atlético Levante (VI), Llosetense (XI), Izarra (XV)								
2015–16	**Boiro**	**Caudal**	Laredo	**Zamudio**	**Prat**	**Atlético Saguntino**	**SS Reyes**	Zamora	**At. Mancha Real**
2015–16	**Córdoba B**	**Mallorca B**	Villa de Santa Brígida	Lorca Deportiva	**Extremadura**	**Osasuna B**	Calahorra	Deportivo Aragón	Conquense
2015–16	Other promoted teams: Gavà (V), Navalcarnero (VII), Palencia (VIII), El Ejido (IX), At. Sanluqueño (X), San Fernando (X), Mutilvera (XV)								
2016–17	**Deportivo B**	**Sporting B**	Gimn. Torrelavega	Alavés B	**Olot**	Olímpic	**Atlético Madrid B**	**Gimn. Segoviana**	Atlético Malagueño
2016–17	**Real Betis B**	**Formentera**	**Las Palmas Atlético**	**Lorca Deportiva**	Cacereño	**Peña Sport**	Calahorra	**Deportivo Aragón**	**Talavera de la Reina**
2016–17	Other promoted teams: Rápido de Bouzas (I), Vitoria (IV), Ontinyent (VI), Unión Adarve (VII), Écija (X), Badajoz (XIV)								
2017–18	Compostela	**Oviedo B**	**Gimn. Torrelavega**	**Cultural Durango**	**Espanyol B**	**Atlético Levante**	**Internacional**	**Unionistas**	**Atlético Malagueño**
2017–18	Cádiz B	Mallorca B	Tenerife B	Yeclano	**Don Benito**	Mutilvera	**Calahorra**	**Teruel**	**Conquense**
2017–18	Other promoted teams: Langreo (II), Castellón (VI), Salmantino (VIII), Almería B (IX), Atlético Sanluqueño (X), Ejea (XVII)								
2018–19	**Racing Ferrol**	Lealtad	Escobedo	Portugalete	**Llagostera**	**Orihuela**	**Getafe B**	Zamora	Jaén
2018–19	**Cádiz B**	**Peña Deportiva**	Tamaraceite	**Yeclano**	**Mérida**	**Osasuna B**	**Haro**	Tarazona	Socuéllamos
2018–19	Other promoted teams: Marino Luanco (II), Alavés B (IV), Prat (V), La Nucía (VI), Las Rozas (VII), Algeciras (X), Villarrubia (XVIII), Villarrobledo (XVIII)								
2019–20	**Compostela**	**Lealtad**	**Laredo**	**Portugalete**	**L'Hospitalet**	**Alcoyano**	**Navalcarnero**	**Zamora**	**Linares**
2019–20	**Betis Deportivo**	**Poblense**	**Marino**	**Lorca Deportiva**	**Villanovense**	**Mutilvera**	**SD Logroñés**	**Tarazona**	**Socuéllamos**
2019–20	Other promoted teams: Covadonga (II), Atzeneta (VI), El Ejido (IX), Tamaraceite (XII)								
2020–21	**Arenteiro**	**Ceares**	**Cayón**	**Gernika**	**Europa**	**Eldense**	**Leganés B**	**Gimn. Segoviana**	**Vélez**
2020–21	**Xerez Deportivo**	**Ibiza Pitiusas**	**Mensajero**	**Águilas FC**	**Cacereño**	**Peña Sport**	**Racing Rioja**	**Teruel**	**Marchamalo**
2020–21	Other promoted teams: Bergantiños, Arosa (I) Llanera, Avilés (II) Rayo Cantabria, Tropezón (III) Real Sociedad C, Sestao River (IV) Terrassa, Cerdanyola del Vallès (V) Alzira, Intercity (VI) Unión Adarve, Móstoles URJC (VII) Cristo Atlético, Burgos Promesas (VIII) Atlético Mancha Real, Antequera (IX) San Roque de Lepe, Ceuta (X) Andratx, Formentera (XI) Panadería Pulido, San Fernando (XII) Atlético Pulpileño, Mar Menor (XIII) Montijo, Coria (XIV) San Juan, Ardoi (XV) Náxara, UD Logroñés B (XVI) Brea, Huesca B (XVII) Calvo Sotelo, Toledo (XVIII)								

=== Records ===
Most seasons

- 68 – Murcia Imperial
- 61 – Arenas Getxo
- 59 – Constància

Most points

- 2,955 – Constància (1.43 per game)
- 2,876 – Murcia Imperial (1.28 per game)
- 2,747 – Don Benito (1.48 per game)

Most games played

- 2,205 – Murcia Imperial (32.42 per season)
- 2,110 – Arenas Getxo (34.60 per season)
- 2,093 – Europa (36.72 per season)

Most wins

- 1080 – Cacereño (57.53%)
- 1035 – Constància (50.07%)
- 947 – Don Benito (51.00%)

Most draws

- 591 – Arenas Getxo (28.01%)
- 514 – Murcia Imperial (23.31%)
- 509 – Baskonia (26.24%)

Most losses

- 756 – Lemos (44.31%)
- 707 – Arenas Getxo (33.51%)
- 705 – Murcia Imperial (31.97%)

Most goals scored

- 3,894 – Cacereño (2.06 per game)
- 3,796 – Murcia Imperial (1.72 per game)
- 3,682 – Rayo Cantabria, formerly Racing Santander B (1.85 per game)

Most goals received

- 2,838 – Murcia Imperial (1.34 per game)
- 2,759 – Atlético Monzón (1.45 per game)
- 2,674 – Europa (1.31 per game)

Most group titles

- 16 – Caudal

Most promotion play-offs played

- 21 – Peña Sport

Highest attendance

- 27,214 – Oviedo 1–0 Mallorca B, at Estadio Carlos Tartiere on 24 May 2009
