= 2026 Segunda Federación play-offs =

The 2026 Segunda Federación play-offs (Playoffs de Ascenso or Promoción de Ascenso) are the final play-offs for promotion from 2025–26 Segunda Federación to the 2026–27 Primera Federación.

== Format ==
Twenty teams will participe in the promotion play-off. Each of the five groups of the Segunda División RFEF are represented by the four teams that finished the regular season between the second and fifth positions. In the draw for the first stage, the participating teams were assigned to pots corresponding to their final regular season position. While avoiding matches between teams from the same regular season group, second-place finishers were drawn against fifth-place finishers while teams that finished third would play teams that finished fourth. The same draw process was repeated, to the extent that it would be possible, in the draw for the second round.

The five winning clubs of the second stage will be promoted and will accompany the five group champions who had already been promoted.

The final two relegation spots (of 27 total) will also be determined via play-offs. The four 13th-place finishers with the lowest point totals will be drawn into two single-leg matches, with the winners securing survival in the Segunda División RFEF and the losers being relegated to the Tercera División RFEF. The two match-ups will be selected through a random draw and hosted at a venue chosen from among the stadiums selected to host the promotion play-offs.

== Promotion play-offs ==
=== Teams ===
==== Participating teams ====
- Águilas
- Alavés B
- Alcoyano
- Atlético Baleares
- Conquense
- Coria
- Coruxo
- Getafe B
- Jaén
- UD Logroñés
- Minera
- Numancia
- UD Ourense
- Oviedo Vetusta
- Poblense
- Reus FCR
- San Sebastián de los Reyes
- Tudelano
- Utebo
- Xerez

==== Road to the play-offs ====
===== Group 1 =====
Pos	Team	Pld	W	D	L	GF	GA	GD	Pts	Qualification
2	Oviedo Vetusta	34	16	10	8	50	35	+15	58	Qualification for the promotion play-offs
3	Numancia	34	15	11	8	46	31	+15	56	Qualification for the promotion play-offs and Copa del Rey
4	UD Ourense (P)	34	15	10	9	40	34	+6	55	Qualification for the promotion play-offs and Copa del Rey
5	Coruxo	34	15	7	12	46	37	+9	52	Qualification for the promotion play-offs and Copa del Rey

Rules for classification: 1) points; 2) head-to-head points; 3) head-to-head goal difference; 4) goal difference; 5) number of goals scored
(Note: Head-to-head record is used only after all the matches between the teams in question have been played)
(P) Promoted

===== Group 2 =====
Pos	Team	Pld	W	D	L	GF	GA	GD	Pts	Qualification
2	Alavés B	34	17	11	6	41	20	+21	62	Qualification for the promotion play-offs
3	UD Logroñés (P)	34	18	7	9	73	33	+40	61	Qualification for the promotion promotion play-offs and Copa del Rey
4	Utebo	34	17	7	10	56	42	+14	58	Qualification for the promotion promotion play-offs and Copa del Rey
5	Tudelano	34	16	9	9	56	40	+16	57	Qualification for the promotion promotion play-offs and Copa del Rey

Rules for classification: 1) points; 2) head-to-head points; 3) head-to-head goal difference; 4) goal difference; 5) number of goals scored
(Note: Head-to-head record is used only after all the matches between the teams in question have been played)
(P) Promoted

===== Group 3 =====
Pos	Team	Pld	W	D	L	GF	GA	GD	Pts	Qualification
2	Atlético Baleares	34	19	9	6	53	34	+19	66 (Note: Sant Andreu finished ahead of Atlético Baleares on head-to-head points: Atlético Baleares 2–4 Sant Andreu, Sant Andreu 2–0 Atlético Baleares)	Qualification for the promotion play-offs and Copa del Rey
3	Poblense	34	16	11	7	41	28	+13	59	Qualification for the promotion play-offs and Copa del Rey
4	Reus FCR	34	16	7	11	50	38	+12	55 (Note: Reus FCR finished ahead of Alcoyano on head-to-head points: Alcoyano 0–1 Reus FCR, Reus FCR 2–1 Alcoyano)	Qualification for the promotion play-offs and Copa del Rey
5	Alcoyano	34	13	16	5	30	20	+10	55	Qualification for the promotion play-offs and Copa del Rey

Rules for classification: 1) points; 2) head-to-head points; 3) head-to-head goal difference; 4) goal difference; 5) number of goals scored
(Note: Head-to-head record is used only after all the matches between the teams in question have been played)

===== Group 4 =====
Pos	Team	Pld	W	D	L	GF	GA	GD	Pts	Qualification
2	Minera	34	19	6	9	50	33	+17	63 (Note: Extremadura finished ahead of Minera on head-to-head points: Minera 2–2 Extremadura, Extremadura 1–0 Minera)	Qualification for the promotion play-offs and Copa del Rey
3	Águilas (P)	34	18	7	9	45	25	+20	61	Qualification for the promotion play-offs and Copa del Rey
4	Xerez	34	17	8	9	32	24	+8	59	Qualification for the promotion play-offs and Copa del Rey
5	Jaén (P)	34	16	10	8	43	33	+10	58	Qualification for the promotion play-offs and Copa del Rey

Rules for classification: 1) points; 2) head-to-head points; 3) head-to-head goal difference; 4) goal difference; 5) number of goals scored
(Note: Head-to-head record is used only after all the matches between the teams in question have been played)
(P) Promoted

===== Group 5 =====
Pos	Team	Pld	W	D	L	GF	GA	GD	Pts	Qualification
2	San Sebastián de los Reyes	34	21	7	6	51	27	+24	70 (Note: Rayo Majadahonda finished ahead of San Sebastián de los Reyes on head-to-head points: Rayo Majadahonda 2–1 San Sebastián de los Reyes, San Sebastián de los Reyes 1–1 Rayo Majadahonda)	Qualification for the promotion play-offs and Copa del Rey
3	Conquense	34	16	12	6	42	30	+12	60	Qualification for the promotion play-offs and Copa del Rey
4	Getafe B	34	16	9	9	55	35	+20	57 (Note: Getafe B finished ahead of Coria on overall goal difference)	Qualification for the promotion play-offs
5	Coria (P)	34	16	9	9	50	38	+12	57	Qualification for the promotion play-offs and Copa del Rey

Rules for classification: 1) points; 2) head-to-head points; 3) head-to-head goal difference; 4) goal difference; 5) number of goals scored
(Note: Head-to-head record is used only after all the matches between the teams in question have been played)
(P) Promoted

=== First round ===
==== Qualified teams ====
Group	Position	Team
1	2nd	Oviedo Vetusta
2	2nd	Alavés B
3	2nd	Atlético Baleares
4	2nd	Minera
5	2nd	San Sebastián de los Reyes

Group	Position	Team
1	3rd	UD Ourense
2	3rd	UD Logroñés
3	3rd	Poblense
4	3rd	Águilas
5	3rd	Conquense

Group	Position	Team
1	4th	Numancia
2	4th	Utebo
3	4th	Reus FCR
4	4th	Xerez
5	4th	Getafe B

Group	Position	Team
1	5th	Coruxo
2	5th	Tudelano
3	5th	Alcoyano
4	5th	Jaén
5	5th	Coria

==== Matches ====
Team 1	Agg.	Team 2	1st leg	2nd leg
Coruxo	1–4	Atlético Baleares	0–3	1–1
Jaén	3–2	Alavés B	1–2	2–0 (a.e.t.)
Coria	1–0	Minera	0–0	1–0
Alcoyano	1–3	San Sebastián de los Reyes	0–2	1–1
Tudelano	1–3	Oviedo Vetusta	0–1	1–2 (a.e.t.)
Utebo	2–4	Águilas	1–2	1–2
Getafe B	1–4	UD Logroñés	0–2	1–2
Reus FCR	1–2	UD Ourense	0–0	1–2
Numancia	1–3	Poblense	0–1	1–2
Xerez	1–1	Conquense	1–1	0–0 (seed)

First leg

9 May 2026	Coria	0–0	Minera	Coria
18:00 UTC+2		Report		Stadium: Estadio La Isla; Attendance: 1,600; Referee: Anas Bakali Bentaleb

9 May 2026	Tudelano	0–1	Oviedo Vetusta	Tudela
19:00 UTC+2		Report	Óscar de la Hera 79'	Stadium: Estadio Ciudad de Tudela; Attendance: 8,000; Referee: Mario Ruiz Gómez

9 May 2026	Reus FCR	0–0	UD Ourense	Reus
19:00 UTC+2		Report		Stadium: Estadi Municipal de Reus; Attendance: 3,914; Referee: Nil Cubas Torras

9 May 2026	Xerez	1–1	Conquense	Jerez de la Frontera
19:00 UTC+2	Charaf Taoualy 50'	Report	Ale Sánchez 46'	Stadium: Estadio Municipal de Chapín; Attendance: 10,200; Referee: Ángel Caro Mogío

10 May 2026	Getafe B	0–2	UD Logroñés	Getafe
11:30 UTC+2		Report	Sergio Camacho 55'; Berto 83'	Stadium: Ciudad Deportiva Getafe CF; Attendance: 750; Referee: Sergi Rimbau Guillaumes

10 May 2026	Numancia	0–1	Poblense	Soria
12:00 UTC+2		Report	Marco Alarcón 72'	Stadium: Nuevo Estadio Los Pajaritos; Referee: Alberto Fernández Nicolás

10 May 2026	Utebo	1–2	Águilas	Utebo
17:00 UTC+2	Carlos Beitia 90+1'	Report	Pipo 7'; Kevin Manzano 90+2'	Stadium: Estadio Santa Ana; Referee: Álex Rivas Etulain

10 May 2026	Jaén	1–2	Alavés B	Jaén
18:30 UTC+2	Marco Siverio 41' (pen.)		Diego Morcillo 35'; Izei Hernández 59'	Stadium: Nuevo Estadio de La Victoria; Attendance: 8,011; Referee: Carlos Castell Orozco

10 May 2026	Alcoyano	0–2	San Sebastián de los Reyes	Alcoy
18:30 UTC+2		Report	Fer Ruiz 24'; Mario González 56'	Stadium: Estadio El Collao; Attendance: 3,200; Referee: Marc Oltra Sáez

10 May 2026	Coruxo	0–3	Atlético Baleares	Vigo
19:00 UTC+2		Report	Rubén Bover 9', 12'; Mouhamadou Keita 55'	Stadium: Campo do Vao; Referee: Alberto Sánchez Ingidua

Second Leg

16 May 2026	Oviedo Vetusta	2–1 (a.e.t.)	Tudelano	Oviedo
18:00 UTC+2	Óscar de la Hera 108', 113'	Report	Iñigo Alayeto 80'	Stadium: Estadio Carlos Tartiere; Referee: Daniel Pastoriza Iglesias

16 May 2026	UD Ourense	2–1	Reus FCR	Ourense
18:00 UTC+2	Rufo Sánchez 8'; Justino Barbosa 71'	Report	Carbià 30'	Stadium: Estadio de O Couto; Referee: Gaizka Altuna Paguey

16 May 2026	UD Logroñés	2−1	Getafe B	Logroño
20:15 UTC+2	Miguel Marí 71'; Anai Morales 88'	Report	José Luis Pérez 50'	Stadium: Estadio Las Gaunas; Referee: Eduardo Rodríguez García

17 May 2026	Atlético Baleares	1–1	Coruxo	Palma de Mallorca
12:00 UTC+2	Miguelito 85'	Report	Mateo Gandarillas 53'	Stadium: Estadio Balear; Attendance: 2,285; Referee: Sergi Carrero Romera

17 May 2026	Alavés B	0–2 (a.e.t.)	Jaén	Vitoria-Gasteiz
12:00 UTC+2		Report	Ivan Breñé 61'; Javi Moyano 110'	Stadium: Ciudad Deportiva José Luis Compañón; Referee: Johan González Rodríguez

17 May 2026	Minera	0–1	Coria	Llano del Beal
12:00 UTC+2		Report	Dawda Dambellah 86'	Stadium: Estadio Municipal Ángel Celdrán; Referee: Juan José Lidón Rocamora

17 May 2026	San Sebastián de los Reyes	1–1	Alcoyano	San Sebastián de los Reyes
12:00 UTC+2	Fer Ruiz 22'	Report	Steven Prieto 73'	Stadium: Estadio Municipal Nuevo Matapiñonera; Attendance: 1,700; Referee: Carlos Agraz Díaz

17 May 2026	Poblense	2–1	Numancia	Sa Pobla
12:00 UTC+2	Marco Alarcón 8'; Aitor Pons 88'	Report	Jonathan González 61' (pen.)	Stadium: Nou Camp de Sa Pobla; Referee: Alejandro Noguera Moreno

17 May 2026	Conquense	0–0	Xerez	Cuenca
18:30 UTC+2		Report		Stadium: Estadio La Fuensanta; Attendance: 6,500; Referee: Kevin Javier Moreno Muñoz

17 May 2026	Águilas	2–1	Utebo	Águilas
19:00 UTC+2	Javi Castedo 41'; Johan Terranova 62'	Report	Camilo Leiton 55'	Stadium: Estadio El Rubial; Referee: Joan Masip Vidal

=== Second round ===
==== Qualified teams ====
Group	Position	Team
1	2nd	Oviedo Vetusta
3	2nd	Atlético Baleares
5	2nd	San Sebastián de los Reyes

Group	Position	Team
1	3rd	UD Ourense
2	3rd	UD Logroñés
3	3rd	Poblense
4	3rd	Águilas
5	3rd	Conquense

Group	Position	Team
4	5th	Jaén
5	5th	Coria

==== Matches ====
Team 1	Agg.	Team 2	1st leg	2nd leg
Jaén	4–2	Atlético Baleares	2–1	2–1
Coria	4–0	Oviedo Vetusta	3–0	1–0
UD Logroñés	2–1	San Sebastián de los Reyes	1–0	1–1 (a.e.t.)
UD Ourense	3–0	Conquense	1–0	2–0
Águilas	1–1 (5−4 p)	Poblense	0–0	1–1 (a.e.t.)

First leg

24 May 2026	Águilas	0–0	Poblense	Águilas
12:00 UTC+2		Report		Stadium: Estadio El Rubial; Referee: Ignacio Bordons Romero

24 May 2026	UD Ourense	1–0	Conquense	Ourense
17:00 UTC+2	Santiago de Prado 39'	Report		Stadium: Estadio de O Couto; Referee: Ramón Collado Fernández

24 May 2026	Jaén	2–1	Atlético Baleares	Jaén
19:00 UTC+2	Marco Siverio 49'; Agus Alonso 90+8' (pen.)	Report	Mauro Cabello 61' (o.g.)	Stadium: Nuevo Estadio de La Victoria; Referee: Alejandro Tomé Alonso

24 May 2026	Coria	3–0	Oviedo Vetusta	Coria
19:00 UTC+2	Benji 2'; Álex Toper 38'; Jacobo Guzmán 52'	Report		Stadium: Estadio La Isla; Referee: Jesús López Fernández

24 May 2026	UD Logroñés	1–0	San Sebastián de los Reyes	Logroño
19:00 UTC+2	Berto 26'	Report		Stadium: Estadio Las Gaunas; Referee: Jayro Muñoz García

Second leg

30 May 2026	San Sebastián de los Reyes	1–1 (a.e.t.)	UD Logroñés	San Sebastián de los Reyes
19:00 UTC+2	Miguel García Lucio 45' (pen.)	Report	Eduardo Cabetas 114'	Stadium: Estadio Municipal Nuevo Matapiñonera; Referee: Guillermo García Presa

31 May 2026	Oviedo Vetusta	0–1	Coria	Oviedo
12:00 UTC+2		Report	José Martín 90+5'	Stadium: Estadio Carlos Tartiere; Referee: Aitor Barrio Salas

31 May 2026	Poblense	1−1 (a.e.t.) (4−5 p)	Águilas	Sa Pobla
12:00 UTC+2	Francesc Fullana 111' (pen.)	Report	Yasser El Arbaoui 101'	Stadium: Nou Camp de Sa Pobla; Referee: Manuel Ramírez Marco

31 May 2026	Atlético Baleares	1−2 (a.e.t.)	Jaén	Palma de Mallorca
19:00 UTC+2	Jaume Tovar 12'		Marco Siverio 98'; José Carrillo 105'	Stadium: Estadio Balear

31 May 2026	Conquense	0−2	UD Ourense	Cuenca
19:00 UTC+2			Hugo Busto 90'; Migui 90+2'	Stadium: Estadio La Fuensanta

== Promoted teams ==
- The five teams that were or would be promoted to Primera Federación through regular season groups and the five play-off winners were included.
- The number of years after the last participation of the club in the third tier is referred to the previous appearance at that level. Depending on the time, it could have been Tercera División (until 1977), Segunda División B (1977–2021) or Primera Federación (2021–present).

Promoted to Primera Federación
Group 1	Group 2	Group 3	Group 4	Group 5
Deportivo Fabril (1st) (7 years later)	Real Unión (1st) (1 year later)	Sant Andreu (1st) (11 years later)	Extremadura (1st) (First time ever)	Rayo Majadahonda (1st) (2 years later)
UD Ourense (4th) (First time ever)	UD Logroñés (3rd) (3 years later)		Águilas (3rd) (First time ever)	Coria (5th) (First time ever)
			Jaén (5th) (9 years later)	

== Relegation play-offs ==
=== Table of 13th-placed teams ===
Pos	Grp	Team	Pld	W	D	L	GF	GA	GD	Pts	Qualification or relegation
1	1	Valladolid Promesas	34	12	9	13	59	58	+1	45	
2	4	Estepona (O)	34	12	8	14	40	44	−4	44	Qualification for the relegation play-offs
3	3	Castellón B (O)	34	11	9	14	59	72	−13	42	Qualification for the relegation play-offs
4	5	Real Madrid C (O)	34	11	7	16	42	45	−3	40	Qualification for the relegation play-offs
5	2	SD Logroñés (O)	34	8	13	13	22	40	−18	37	Qualification for the relegation play-offs

Updated to match(es) played on 3 May 2026. Source:
Rules for classification: 1) points; 2) goal difference; 3) number of goals scored
(O) Play-off winners

=== Qualified teams ===
Group	Position	Team
2	13th	SD Logroñés
3	13th	Castellón B
4	13th	Estepona
5	13th	Real Madrid C

=== Matches ===
Team 1	Agg.	Team 2	1st leg	2nd leg
Real Madrid C	3–5	Estepona	2–2	1–3
Castellón B	2–4	SD Logroñés	2–3	0–1

First leg

10 May 2026	Castellón B	2–3	SD Logroñés	Castellón de la Plana
12:00 UTC+2	Marcos Montero 65'; Charbel Wehbe 67'	Report	Dani Sancho 11'; Arman Lazcano 84'; Dani Santafé 89'	Stadium: Nou Estadi Castàlia; Referee: Francisco José Fernández Cintas

10 May 2026	Real Madrid C	2–2	Estepona	Madrid
18:00 UTC+2	Daniel Mesonero 3'; Álvaro Leiva 53'	Report	Héber Pena 19'; Alfonso Candelas 46'	Stadium: Ciudad Real Madrid; Attendance: 700; Referee: Mario Pacheco Cotero

Second leg

16 May 2026	Estepona	3–1	Real Madrid C	Estepona
21:00 UTC+2	Héber Pena 8'; David Ballarín 58'; Samu Expósito 73'	Report	Daniel Mesonero 55'	Stadium: Estadio Municipal Francisco Muñoz Pérez; Attendance: 3,000; Referee: Joaquín Béjar Caballero

17 May 2026	SD Logroñés	1–0	Castellón B	Logroño
18:00 UTC+2	Sergio Gil 67'	Report		Stadium: Estadio Las Gaunas; Referee: Omar Álvarez Rodríguez

== Relegated teams ==
- 27 teams relegated to Tercera Federación: 25 teams through regular season groups and the two play-off losers.
- The numbers of years after the last relegation are referred to the last participation of the club in Tercera División or Tercera Federación if the team was promoted after 2021.

Relegated to Tercera Federación
UP Langreo (8 years later)	SD Sarriana (1 year later)	Burgos Promesas (1 year later)	Lealtad (1 year later)	Sámano (1 year later)	Beasain (1 year later)
Ejea (2 years later)	Mutilvera (1 year later)	Deportivo Aragón (4 years later)	Alfaro (2 years later)	Ibiza Islas Pitiusas (2 years later)	Andratx (3 years later)
Atlètic Lleida (1 year later)	Torrent (3 years later)	Porreres (1 year later)	Puente Genil (1 year later)	Xerez Deportivo (2 years later)	Melilla (39 years later)
Almería B (2 years later)	Atlético Malagueño (1 year later)	Quintanar del Rey (1 year later)	Fuenlabrada (14 years later)	Moscardó (2 years later)	Socuéllamos (1 year later)
Rayo Vallecano B (1 year later)
