= Meso =

Meso or mesos may refer to:

- Apache Mesos, a computer clustering management platform
- Meso, in-game currency for the massively multiplayer online role-playing game MapleStory
- Meso compound, a stereochemical classification in chemistry
- Meso position (tetrapyrrole), IUPAC chemical nomenclature prefix used for tetrapyrroles
- Mesolithic, archaeological period between the Upper Paleolithic and the Neolithic
- Mesopotamia, the first major river civilization, known today as Iraq
- Mesoamerica, Americas, or Native Americans
- Mesothelioma, a form of cancer
- Mesoscopic physics, subdiscipline of condensed matter physics that deals with materials of an intermediate size
- Multiple Equivalent Simultaneous Offers, a strategy used in negotiation
- Dani Meso (born 2005), Spanish footballer
