= Joan Prohens =

Spanish footballer (born 2003)

Personal information
- Full name: Joan Prohens Mas
- Date of birth: 1 April 2005 (age 21)
- Place of birth: Santanyí, Spain
- Height: 1.78 m (5 ft 10 in)
- Position: Forward

Team information
- Current team: Gimnàstic

Youth career
- Manacor
- 2022–2024: Levante

Senior career*
Years	Team	Apps	(Gls)
2024–2026	Poblense	46	(9)
2026–	Gimnàstic	0	(0)
- * Club domestic league appearances and goals as of 9 June 2026

Joan Prohens Mas (born 1 April 2005) is a Spanish professional footballer who plays as a forward for Gimnàstic de Tarragona.

== Career ==
Born in Santanyí, Mallorca, Balearic Islands, Prohens joined Levante UD's youth sides in May 2022, after impressing with CE Manacor's Juvenil sides. He left the side in June 2024, and was announced at Tercera Federación side UD Poblense on 8 July.

Despite being rarely used as Poblense achieved promotion to Segunda Federación, Prohens renewed his contract with the club for a further year on 18 June 2025. He subsequently became a regular starter in the 2025–26 season, scoring seven goals as the club missed out a second consecutive promotion in the play-offs, but left on 12 June 2026.

On 22 June 2026, Prohens joined Primera Federación side Gimnàstic de Tarragona on a two-year deal.
