= Fran Núñez =

Dominican Republic footballer (b. 1995)

Personal information
- Full name: Francisco José Núñez Rodríguez
- Date of birth: 15 May 1995 (age 31)
- Place of birth: San Bartolomé de Tirajana, Spain
- Height: 1.78 m (5 ft 10 in)
- Position: Winger

Senior career*
Years	Team	Apps	(Gls)
2015–2016	Atlético Levante	29	(2)
2016–2017	Somozas	21	(0)
2017–2020	Peña Deportiva	84	(23)
2020–2021	Rayo Majadahonda	4	(0)
2021	→ Peña Deportiva (loan)	14	(0)
2021–2023	Melilla	68	(10)
2023–2024	La Unión Atlético	18	(1)
2024–2025	Ibiza Islas Pitiusas	27	(7)
2025	Xerez Deportivo	15	(1)

International career^{‡}
2019–	Dominican Republic	8	(2)
- * Club domestic league appearances and goals as of 4 May 2025 ‡ National team caps and goals as of 24 March 2021

Francisco José Núñez Rodríguez (born 15 May 1995), better known as Fran Núñez, is a professional footballer who plays as a winger. Born in Spain, he represents Dominican Republic national team.

== International career ==
Núñez made his professional debut for the Dominican Republic national football team in a 1-0 friendly over win Guadeloupe on 15 February 2019, and scored his side's only goal.

== Personal life ==
Núñez has a twin brother, Benjamín Núñez, also a footballer, who plays for AD Ceuta FC and is also a member of the Dominican Republic national team.
