= Rai Rosa =

Spanish footballer and manager

Personal information
- Full name: Raimundo Rosa Nieto
- Date of birth: 22 February 1980 (age 46)
- Place of birth: Cáceres, Spain
- Height: 1.70 m (5 ft 7 in)
- Position: Forward

Team information
- Current team: Coria (manager)

Youth career
- Cacereño

Senior career*
Years	Team	Apps	(Gls)
1999–2000	Cacereño	2	(0)
2000–2002	Amanecer		
2002–2005	Plasencia		
2005–2008	Miajadas		
2008–2010	Cacereño		
2011–2012	Diocesano		
2012–2014	Miajadas		
2014	Coria		
2014–2017	Amanecer		

International career
2008	Extremadura	1	(2)

Managerial career
- 2016–2017: Amanecer B
- 2018–2019: Diocesano
- 2019–2022: Coria
- 2023: Mérida
- 2024–: Coria
- * Club domestic league appearances and goals

Raimundo "Rai" Rosa Nieto (born 22 February 1980) is a Spanish retired footballer who played as a forward, who is currently the manager of Primera Federación side CD Coria.

== Playing career ==
=== Club ===
Known as just Rai as a player, Rosa was born in Cáceres, Extremadura, and finished his formation with hometown side CP Cacereño, featuring in two first team matches during the 1999–2000 campaign as they suffered relegation from Segunda División B. In 2000, he left the club to join CP Amanecer in the Regional Preferente, where he started to feature regularly.

On 15 July 2008, after spells at Tercera División sides UP Plasencia and CD Miajadas, Rosa returned to his first club Cacereño, now also in the fourth division. He achieved promotion to the third level in his first season, and helped the club to narrowly avoid relegation in his second, both as a regular starter.

After leaving Cacereño again in 2010, Rosa spent a year nursing an Achilles tendon injury before returning to action with CD Diocesano in the regional leagues. On 11 January 2012, he returned to Miajadas.

On 18 January 2014, Rosa signed with CD Coria also in the fourth tier, after leaving Miajadas. He returned to Amanecer in July of that year, and retired with the club in 2017, aged 37.

=== International ===
On 27 December 2008, Rosa also played for the Extremadura autonomous team in a friendly against Peru, scoring twice as the match ended 2–2.

== Managerial career ==
During his last playing season at Amanecer, Rosa was also managing the club's reserve team in the regional leagues. In July 2018, he was appointed manager of Diocesano in the fourth division.

In June 2019, Rosa left Dioce and was named in charge of another club he represented as a player, Coria. He led the side to promotion to Segunda División RFEF, and narrowly missed out a second consecutive promotion in the play-offs before leaving on 27 May 2022.

On 7 June 2023, after a year unemployed, Rosa was appointed in charge of Primera Federación side Mérida AD. On 9 October, after four consecutive defeats, he was sacked.

On 4 July 2024, after almost nine months without a club, Rosa returned to Coria who had recently been promoted to the fourth division. The following 22 May, after leading the side to a 7th placed finish, he renewed his contract for a further year, and agreed to another one-year extension on 11 June 2026, after their first-ever promotion to division three.

== Managerial statistics ==
As of 14 November 2026

Managerial record by team and tenure
Team	Nat	From	To	Record								Ref
Team	Nat	From	To	G	W	D	L	GF	GA	GD	Win %	Ref
Amanecer B	(Spain)	1 July 2016	16 May 2017	32	6	4	22	35	77	−42	18.75	
Diocesano	(Spain)	6 July 2018	12 June 2019	38	12	13	13	40	45	−5	31.58	
Coria	(Spain)	12 June 2019	27 May 2022	93	54	17	22	144	86	+58	58.06	
Mérida	(Spain)	7 June 2023	9 October 2023	7	2	1	4	6	11	−5	28.57	
Coria	(Spain)	4 July 2024	Present	88	38	22	28	122	113	+9	43.18	
Total				258	112	57	89	347	332	+15	43.41	—
