= Víctor Mena (footballer, born 1995) =

Spanish footballer

Personal information
- Full name: Víctor Manuel Mena Coto
- Date of birth: 24 February 1995 (age 31)
- Place of birth: Los Palacios, Spain
- Height: 1.73 m (5 ft 8 in)
- Position: Left back

Team information
- Current team: Malacitano
- Number: 3

Youth career
- Sevilla

Senior career*
Years	Team	Apps	(Gls)
2013–2015	Sevilla C	53	(1)
2015–2016	San Roque	45	(0)
2016–2018	Córdoba B	60	(0)
2017–2019	Córdoba	3	(0)
2018–2019	→ Salamanca (loan)	24	(0)
2019–2021	Melilla	15	(0)
2021–2023	Linense	43	(3)
2023–2024	UCAM Murcia	44	(0)
2024–2025	La Unión Atlético	31	(0)
2025–	Malacitano	22	(0)
- * Club domestic league appearances and goals as of 15 May 2026

Víctor Manuel Mena Coto (born 24 February 1995) is a Spanish footballer who plays as a left back for Segunda Federación club Malacitano.

== Club career ==
Mena was born in Los Palacios y Villafranca, Seville, Andalusia, and was a Sevilla FC youth graduate. He made his senior debut with the C-team on 28 September 2013, starting in a 1–4 Tercera División home loss against Xerez CD.

On 10 August 2015, Mena was presented at Segunda División B club CD San Roque de Lepe. The following 8 June he signed for another reserve team, Córdoba CF B also in the third division.

On 9 June 2017, Mena renewed his contract until 2020. He made his first team debut on the following day, starting in a 2–1 Segunda División home win against Girona FC.

Ahead of the 2018–19 season, Mena was not registered neither with the first-team nor with the B's, despite being under contract. On 14 November 2018, he was loaned to third division side Salamanca CF until the following June.

On 23 July 2019, Mena signed for UD Melilla in the third division, after terminating his contract with Córdoba.
