= Víctor Mena =

Víctor Mena may refer to:

- Víctor Mena (footballer, born 1980) (Víctor Humberto Mena Dolmo), Honduran footballer
- Víctor Mena (footballer, born 1995) (Víctor Manuel Mena Coto), Spanish footballer
