= MESO =

The acronym MESO may stand for:

- Multiple Equivalent Simultaneous Offers
- Magneto-Electric Spin-Orbit
