= David Sánchez (footballer, born 1998) =

Spanish footballer

Personal information
- Full name: David Sánchez Mallo
- Date of birth: 24 December 1998 (age 27)
- Place of birth: Madrid, Spain
- Height: 1.82 m (6 ft 0 in)
- Position: Midfielder

Team information
- Current team: SD Logroñés
- Number: 8

Youth career
- Leganés

Senior career*
Years	Team	Apps	(Gls)
2017–2018	Leganés C	9	(1)
2017–2019	Leganés B	47	(2)
2019–2020	Deportivo B	16	(0)
2019–2020	Deportivo La Coruña	1	(0)
2020–2022	Hércules	28	(1)
2022	Melilla	4	(0)
2022–2023	Langreo	14	(0)
2023	Ebro	15	(0)
2023–2024	Utebo	33	(0)
2024–2025	Calahorra	30	(0)
2025–	SD Logroñés	32	(2)
- * Club domestic league appearances and goals as of 7 May 2026

David Sánchez Mallo (born 24 December 1998) is a Spanish professional footballer who plays for the Segunda Federación club SD Logroñés as a central midfielder.

== Club career ==
Sánchez was born in Madrid, and represented CD Leganés as a youth. He made his senior debut with the C-team in the 2017–18 campaign, in the regional leagues, and also appeared regularly with the reserves in Tercera División during the campaign.

On 11 July 2019, Sánchez moved to another reserve team, Deportivo Fabril also in the fourth tier. He made his first team debut for Dépor on 1 September, coming on as a second-half substitute for Mujaid in a 1–3 away loss against Rayo Vallecano in the Segunda División championship.

On 31 August 2020, Sánchez signed a two-year contract with Hércules CF in Segunda División B.
