= Jaume Mut =

Spanish footballer

Personal information
- Full name: Jaume Mut Roselló
- Date of birth: 27 February 1964 (age 62)
- Place of birth: Porto Cristo, Spain
- Position: Forward

Team information
- Current team: Porreres (manager)

Youth career
- Manacor

Senior career*
Years	Team	Apps	(Gls)
- Manacor
- Badia Cala Millor
- Cala d'Or

Managerial career
- 1998–2003: Manacor
- 2003–2005: Santanyí
- 2005–2009: Ferriolense
- 2009–2011: Manacor
- 2011–2012: Manacor (assistant)
- 2012–2013: Manacor
- 2013–2014: Atlético Baleares (youth)
- 2014–2015: Cardassar
- 2015–2016: Campos
- 2016–2020: Felanitx
- 2020–2022: Manacor
- 2022: Alavés (assistant)
- 2022–2023: Fortuna Sittard (assistant)
- 2023–2024: Manacor
- 2024–2025: Atlético Baleares
- 2025–: Porreres
- * Club domestic league appearances and goals

Jaume Mut Roselló (born 27 February 1964) is a Spanish retired footballer who played as a forward, and is the current manager of UE Porreres.

== Playing career ==
Born in Porto Cristo, Mallorca, Balearic Islands, Mut played for Manacor, Badia Cala Millor and Cala d'Or as a senior. With Badia, he achieved promotion to Segunda División B in 1987.

== Managerial career ==
After retiring, Mut became a manager of his first club Manacor in 1998. On 10 May 2001, he was named general sporting manager, while also remaining with his managerial duties.

In July 2003, Mut left Manacor to take over fellow Tercera División side Santanyí. In 2005, after missing out promotion twice in the play-offs, he was named in charge of Ferriolense in the same category.

On 26 May 2009, Mut returned to Manacor, with the club now in the Primera Regional Preferente. In July 2011, despite achieving two consecutive promotions, he became an assistant of Xavi Ferriol in July 2011; roughly one year later, after the club's relegation, he returned to the manager role.

On 27 May 2013, Mut was appointed manager of Atlético Baleares' Juvenil squad. He left the club on 6 May of the following year, and took over Cardassar on 13 June.

On 26 October 2015, Mut was named Campos manager, replacing Sergio Tíscar. On 9 June 2016, he was named at the helm of Felanitx, and led the club to their best-ever positions in the fourth tier during the 2017–18 and 2019–20 seasons after finishing fourth; in both occasions, his side missed out promotion in the play-offs.

On 21 July 2020, Mut returned to Manacor for a third spell. On 5 April 2022, he left the club to become Julio Velázquez's assistant at La Liga side Alavés.

Mut followed Velázquez to Dutch side Fortuna Sittard, also as his assistant, before returning to managerial duties with Manacor on 3 September 2023. On 13 March 2024, he became Atlético Baleares' third manager of the season, with the club in Primera Federación.

On 11 February 2025, following a winless start to the new year, Mut was sacked with Atlético Baleares sitting in 7th place in the league.

== Personal life ==
Mut's son, also named Jaume, is also a footballer and a manager. A midfielder, both were together at Manacor and faced each other as managers during the 2023–24 campaign, when his son was in charge of FC Inter Manacor.

Mut's older brother Miguel was also a footballer and a midfielder. He too was groomed at Manacor.

== Managerial statistics ==
As of match played 14 December 2025

Managerial record by team and tenure
Team	Nat	From	To	Record								Ref
Team	Nat	From	To	G	W	D	L	GF	GA	GD	Win %	Ref
Manacor	(Spain)	1 July 1998	30 June 2003	208	103	29	76	344	274	+70	49.52	
Santanyí	(Spain)	1 July 2003	31 May 2005	78	33	20	25	124	111	+13	42.31	
Ferriolense	(Spain)	31 May 2005	26 May 2009	160	85	32	43	300	175	+125	53.13	
Manacor	(Spain)	26 May 2009	5 July 2011	82	52	20	10	155	55	+100	63.41	
Manacor	(Spain)	5 July 2012	27 May 2013	38	16	7	15	46	50	−4	42.11	
Cardassar	(Spain)	13 June 2014	2 June 2015	40	21	14	5	79	38	+41	52.50	
Campos	(Spain)	26 October 2015	9 June 2016	28	9	9	10	37	42	−5	32.14	
Felanitx	(Spain)	9 June 2016	21 July 2020	146	60	36	50	203	179	+24	41.10	
Manacor	(Spain)	21 July 2020	5 April 2022	61	37	12	12	108	61	+47	60.66	
Manacor	(Spain)	3 September 2023	13 March 2024	25	14	4	7	49	30	+19	56.00	
Atlético Baleares	(Spain)	13 March 2024	11 February 2025	33	11	9	13	37	35	+2	33.33	
Porreres	(Spain)	21 October 2025	Present	8	2	3	3	6	7	−1	25.00	
Total				907	443	195	269	1,488	1,057	+431	48.84	—
