= Kike Royo =

Spanish footballer (born 1991)

Personal information
- Full name: Enrique Royo Herranz
- Date of birth: 14 June 1991 (age 35)
- Place of birth: Logroño, Spain
- Height: 1.83 m (6 ft 0 in)
- Position: Goalkeeper

Team information
- Current team: SD Logroñés
- Number: 1

Youth career
- Valvanera
- Deportivo de La Coruña

Senior career*
Years	Team	Apps	(Gls)
2010–2014	Real Sociedad	0	(0)
2010–2011	→ UD Logroñés (loan)	0	(0)
2011–2014	Real Sociedad B	52	(0)
2014–2015	Mallorca B	35	(0)
2014	Mallorca	0	(0)
2015–2018	Guijuelo	103	(0)
2018–2021	Badajoz	83	(0)
2021–2022	Sabadell	10	(0)
2022–2023	Badajoz	31	(0)
2023–2025	UD Logroñés	46	(0)
2025–	SD Logroñés	33	(0)
- * Club domestic league appearances and goals as of 7 May 2026

Enrique Royo Herranz (born 14 June 1991) is a Spanish footballer who plays as a goalkeeper for Segunda Federación club SD Logroñés.

He played for the reserve teams of Real Sociedad and Mallorca early in his career, but never made a first-team appearance. He played 314 games in the third-tier Segunda División B and Primera Federación for five clubs, winning the title and keeping a clean sheet of 901 minutes with Badajoz in 2020–21.

== Career ==
=== Early career ===
Born in Logroño in La Rioja, Royo played as a youth for local team Valvanera before joining the academy of Deportivo de La Coruña. While there, he idolised first-team goalkeeper Dani Aranzubia, who was from the same city.

Royo came through the youth ranks of Real Sociedad, and was loaned to his hometown team UD Logroñés and played for the reserve team, both in Segunda División B. He was an unused substitute in La Liga games, with Claudio Bravo starting and Eñaut Zubikarai first in line as replacement. In the 2013–14 UEFA Champions League group stage, he travelled to all the group games against Manchester United, Shakhtar Donetsk and Bayer Leverkusen, being included on the bench in the final game at home to the German side on 10 December.

In August 2014, having terminated his contract at La Real with once season remaining, Royo joined Mallorca B. Having again not advanced past the bench for the first team in the Segunda División, he moved on to fellow third-tier club Guijuelo in July 2015.

=== Badajoz ===
After three regular seasons for the club from the Province of Salamanca, Royo signed for Badajoz in June 2018. In his first season, he kept a clean sheet of 632 minutes, ending in a 1–1 draw at Linense on 10 March. The campaign ended with a loss to Logroñés in the play-off quarter-finals; he saved a penalty in the second leg in his hometown, within the same 24 hours of his second child being born.

Royo signed a one-year contract extension in June 2019. Four months later he added another two seasons to his deal, keeping him at the club until 2022.

In 2020–21, Royo went on another unbeaten run in the second half of the season; on 18 April he reached 730 minutes as his team won the league with a 4–0 victory at San Sebastián de los Reyes. His streak ended at 901 minutes in a 1–1 draw with the same team on 9 May in the last game of the regular season, and his side lost the playoff final by one goal to Amorebieta.

=== Later career ===
Royo reached an agreement in July 2021 to cancel the last year of his contract at Badajoz. He then signed for Sabadell of the new third-tier Primera Federación, replacing Ian Mackay. Under managers Antonio Hidalgo and Pedro Munitis he was second-choice to youngster Emilio Bernad, keeping four clean sheets in ten games; conceding a late winner at home to Andorra on 27 November ended his involvement.

Royo cancelled his contract in Catalonia and returned to Badajoz of the same league. He said that he wanted to retire at the club. His team were relegated in 2022–23 and he returned to Logroñés after 12 years away, with the team now in the fourth-tier Segunda Federación. He was a regular in 2023–24, but in the following season, managers Miguel Flaño and Sergio Rodríguez preferred other options.

UD Logroñés announced that Royo was released from the club in May 2025, without informing him first. He then signed for SD Logroñés, in the same league and same Estadio Las Gaunas.

== Personal life ==
Royo's father Salvador played as a forward for Logroñés.

== Honours ==
Badajoz

- Segunda División B: 2020–21
