= Iñaki León =

Spanish footballer

Personal information
- Full name: Iñaki León Merino
- Date of birth: 13 February 2000 (age 26)
- Place of birth: Vitoria, Spain
- Position: Centre back

Team information
- Current team: Coria
- Number: 20

Youth career
- Alavés
- Getafe

Senior career*
Years	Team	Apps	(Gls)
2019–2021	Torrijos	64	(2)
2022–2023	Fuenlabrada Promesas	36	(0)
2022–2023	Fuenlabrada	1	(0)
2023–	Coria	85	(2)
- * Club domestic league appearances and goals as of 7 May 2026

Iñaki León Merino (born 13 February 2000) is a Spanish professional footballer who plays as a central defender for CD Coria.

== Club career ==
Born in Vitoria-Gasteiz, Álava, Basque Country, León represented Deportivo Alavés and Getafe CF as a youth. On 30 June 2019, after finishing his formation, he signed for Tercera División side CD Torrijos.

León made his senior debut on 25 August 2019, starting and being sent off in a 0–2 away loss against Calvo Sotelo Puertollano CF. He scored his first goal on 27 October, netting the opener in a 1–1 draw at CD Madridejos.

On 19 July 2021, León renewed his contract with Torrijos for a further year, with the club in the Tercera División RFEF. On 28 December, however, he moved to CF Fuenlabrada and was initially assigned to the reserves also in the fifth division.

León made his first team debut for Fuenla on 6 January 2022, starting in a 0–1 home loss against Cádiz CF in the season's Copa del Rey.
