= CD Estepona FS =

Association football club in Spain

Estepona
- Full name: Club Deportivo Estepona Fútbol Senior
- Founded: 2014
- Ground: Francisco Muñoz Pérez, Estepona, Andalusia, Spain
- Capacity: 3,800
- Chairman: Ildefonso López Flores
- Manager: Manolo Sánchez
- League: Segunda Federación – Group 4
- 2025–26: Segunda Federación – Group 4, 13th of 18
Home colours	Away colours

Club Deportivo Estepona Fútbol Senior is a Spanish football team based in Estepona, Málaga, in the autonomous community of Andalucia. Founded in 2014, it plays in Segunda Federación – Group 4, holding home games at Estadio Municipal Francisco Muñoz Pérez, with a capacity of 3,800 people.

== History ==
Founded in 2014 as a replacement to dissolved Unión Estepona CF, the club initially created a youth setup named Club Deportivo Estepona Fútbol Base, later starting a senior side named Club Deportivo Estepona Fútbol Senior for the 2014–15 campaign. After two consecutive promotions in their first two campaigns, the club spent four seasons in the División de Honor before achieving promotion to Tercera División in May 2020.

Estepona suffered an immediate relegation back to División de Honor (now the sixth tier after the creation of a new third tier), but won their group in the 2021–22 season and returned to Tercera on 30 May 2022. On 20 August, the club achieved administrative promotion to Segunda Federación after buying the place of dissolved Extremadura UD.

After losing in the 2025 Segunda Federación play-off final against Cacereño in 2024-25, the 2025-26 season started terribly with the team only winning 2 of their first 17 games during the first half of the season. However a huge turnaround in the second half of the season saw Estepona finish 13th in the relegation playoff place, where they beat Real Madrid C 5-3 on aggregate to remain in the Segunda Federación.

== Season to season ==
Season	Tier	Division	Place	Copa del Rey
2014–15	7	3ª And.	1st	
2015–16	6	2ª And.	1st	
2016–17	5	Div. Hon.	9th	
2017–18	5	Div. Hon.	10th	
2018–19	5	Div. Hon.	6th	
2019–20	5	Div. Hon.	3rd	
2020–21	4	3ª	8th / 9th	
2021–22	6	Div. Hon.	1st	
2022–23	4	2ª Fed.	8th	
2023–24	4	2ª Fed.	6th	
2024–25	4	2ª Fed.	5th	Second round
2025–26	4	2ª Fed.	13th	First round
2026–27	4	2ª Fed.		

- 5 seasons in Segunda Federación
- 1 season in Tercera División
