= José Miguel Campos =

Spanish footballer

Personal information
- Full name: José Miguel Campos Rodríguez
- Date of birth: 12 August 1966 (age 60)
- Place of birth: Mazarrón, Spain
- Height: 1.80 m (5 ft 11 in)
- Position: Defender

Team information
- Current team: Malacitano (manager)

Youth career
- Murcia

Senior career*
Years	Team	Apps	(Gls)
- Murcia B
1990–1991	Alcoyano	17	(1)
1991–1993	Jaén	53	(1)
1993–1995	Mármol Macael	61	(4)
1995–1998	Melilla	78	(2)
1998–1999	Mármol Macael		
Total		209	(8)

Managerial career
- 2000–2001: Atlético Abarán
- 2001–2003: Bala Azul
- 2003–2006: Baza
- 2006–2008: Murcia B
- 2008–2009: Murcia
- 2010–2011: Jaén
- 2013: Cartagena
- 2013–2015: La Hoya Lorca
- 2015–2016: Granada B
- 2016: Mérida
- 2017–2018: UCAM Murcia
- 2018: Salmantino
- 2024–2025: La Unión Atlético
- 2025–: Malacitano
- * Club domestic league appearances and goals

José Miguel Campos Rodríguez (born 12 August 1966) is a Spanish retired footballer who played as a defender, and is currently the manager of CDU Malacitano.

== Club career ==
Born in Mazarrón, Murcia, Campos graduated with Real Murcia's youth setup, and made his senior debuts with the reserves in Tercera División. He subsequently appeared in Segunda División B with CD Alcoyano, Real Jaén, Mármol Macael CD and UD Melilla; he retired with Mármol in 1999, aged 33.

== Manager career ==
Campos started his managerial career with Atlético Abarán in 2000, and after taking the club back to the fourth level, joined CD Bala Azul. In 2003, he was appointed CD Baza manager, winning promotion at the end of the 2004–05 campaign.

After narrowly avoiding relegation with Baza, Campos returned to Murcia Imperial, being again promoted to the third level. On 19 June 2008 he renewed with the club, being appointed at the helm of the main squad on 18 December, replacing fired Javier Clemente.

On 24 March 2009, after taking the club out of the relegation places, Campos renewed with the Pimentoneros. He was sacked on 2 November, after making only seven points in ten matches.

On 5 July 2010 Campos was appointed Real Jaén manager. He was relieved from his duties in January of the following year, being replaced by Manolo Herrero.

On 20 May 2013 Campos joined FC Cartagena, already qualified for the play-offs. After being knocked out by Caudal Deportivo and thus not obtaining promotion, he left the club.

On 21 June 2013 Campos was appointed at the helm of La Hoya Lorca CF, and led the club to a second place in their first campaign in division three.

On July 4, 2018 Campos was appointed the new head coach of CF Salmantino.

== Managerial statistics ==
As of 23 March 2025

Managerial record by team and tenure
Team	Nat	From	To	Record								Ref
Team	Nat	From	To	G	W	D	L	GF	GA	GD	Win %	Ref
Atlético Abarán	(Spain)	30 June 2000	1 July 2001	30	16	9	5	67	39	+28	53.33	
Bala Azul	(Spain)	1 July 2001	30 June 2003	76	31	24	21	120	77	+43	40.79	
Baza	(Spain)	1 July 2003	30 June 2006	129	61	36	32	201	105	+96	47.29	
Murcia B	(Spain)	1 July 2006	18 December 2008	101	63	22	16	178	72	+106	62.38	
Murcia	(Spain)	18 December 2008	2 November 2009	38	12	13	13	47	49	−2	31.58	
Jaén	(Spain)	5 July 2010	6 January 2011	20	5	8	7	19	18	+1	25.00	
Cartagena	(Spain)	20 May 2013	21 June 2013	2	0	1	1	0	1	−1	0.00	
La Hoya Lorca	(Spain)	21 June 2013	30 June 2015	84	37	23	24	114	79	+35	44.05	
Granada B	(Spain)	30 June 2015	1 July 2016	40	15	14	11	59	45	+14	37.50	
Mérida	(Spain)	1 July 2016	3 October 2016	7	1	1	5	4	13	−9	14.29	
UCAM Murcia	(Spain)	14 November 2017	25 February 2018	17	7	5	5	24	17	+7	41.18	
Salmantino	(Spain)	4 July 2018	3 October 2018	6	1	2	3	7	12	−5	16.67	
La Unión Atlético	(Spain)	4 June 2024	Present	28	18	3	7	30	15	+15	64.29	
Career Total				578	267	161	150	870	542	+328	46.19	—
