= Benji (footballer) =

Dominican Republic footballer (b. 1995)

Personal information
- Full name: Benjamín Rafael Núñez Rodríguez
- Date of birth: 15 May 1995 (age 31)
- Place of birth: San Bartolomé de Tirajana, Spain
- Position: Right-back

Team information
- Current team: CD Coria
- Number: 22

Youth career
- San Pedro Mártir
- Vecindario
- San Pedro Mártir

Senior career*
Years	Team	Apps	(Gls)
2014–2015	Real Ávila		
2017–2019	Las Palmas C	36	(2)
2019–2022	Ceuta	87	(7)
2022–2025	CF Villanovense	89	(3)
2025-	CD Coria	30	(5)

International career^{‡}
- Canary Islands U18
2019–2021	Dominican Republic	3	(0)
- * Club domestic league appearances and goals as of 7 May 2026 ‡ National team caps and goals as of 17 September 2025

Benjamín Rafael Núñez Rodríguez (born 15 May 1995), commonly known as Benji, is a professional footballer who plays as a right-back for Tercera Federación club CD Coria. Born in Spain, he represents the Dominican Republic at international level.

== Early life ==
Benji was raised in El Doctoral, a neighborhood in Vecindario, Gran Canaria, Canary Islands.

== Club career ==
Benji is a former player of CD San Pedro Mártir (two stints), UD Vecindario, Real Ávila CF and UD Las Palmas C.

In November 2022, Benji signed for CF Villanovense.

== International career ==
Benji is a former member of the Canary Islands autonomous under–18 team. He made his senior debut for the Dominican Republic in a 0–1 loss to Saint Lucia on 16 November 2019.

== Personal life ==
Benji has a twin brother, Fran Núñez, also a footballer, who plays for SCR Peña Deportiva and is also a member of the Dominican Republic national team.
