= UD Sámano =

Association football club in Spain

Sámano
- Full name: Unión Deportiva Sámano
- Founded: 1970; 56 years ago
- Stadium: Estadio Vallegon
- Capacity: 1,000
- President: Joseba Fernández
- Head coach: Jon Ander Lambea
- League: Tercera Federación – Group 3
- 2025–26: Segunda Federación – Group 1, 18th of 18 (relegated)
- Website: https://udsamano.com
Home colours	Away colours

Unión Deportiva Sámano is a Spanish football team located in Sámano, municipality Castro Urdiales, in the autonomous community of Cantabria. Founded in 1970 it currently plays in Tercera Federación – Group 3, holding home matches at Estadio Vallegon with a capacity of 1,000 spectators.

== History ==
UD Sámano was founded in 1970.

== Season to season ==
Season	Tier	Division	Place	Copa del Rey
1978–79	7	2ª Reg.	8th	
1979–80	7	2ª Reg.	3rd	
1980–81	6	1ª Reg.	15th	
1981–82	6	1ª Reg.	8th	
1982–83	6	1ª Reg.	19th	
1983–84	7	2ª Reg.	1st	
1984–85	6	1ª Reg.	6th	
1985–86	6	1ª Reg.	4th	
1986–87	5	Reg. Pref.	6th	
1987–88	4	3ª	16th	
1988–89	4	3ª	21st	
1989–90	5	Reg. Pref.	15th	
1990–91	5	Reg. Pref.	8th	
1991–92	5	Reg. Pref.	4th	
1992–93	5	Reg. Pref.	12th	
1993–94	5	Reg. Pref.	14th	
1994–95	5	Reg. Pref.	9th	
1995–96	5	Reg. Pref.	8th	
1996–97	5	Reg. Pref.	9th	
1997–98	5	Reg. Pref.	6th	

Season	Tier	Division	Place	Copa del Rey
1998–99	5	Reg. Pref.	4th	
1999–2000	5	Reg. Pref.	9th	
2000–01	5	Reg. Pref.	5th	
2001–02	5	Reg. Pref.	9th	
2002–03	5	Reg. Pref.	16th	
2003–04	6	1ª Reg.	2nd	
2004–05	6	1ª Reg.	3rd	
2005–06	5	Reg. Pref.	9th	
2006–07	5	Reg. Pref.	7th	
2007–08	5	Reg. Pref.	8th	
2008–09	5	Reg. Pref.	13th	
2009–10	5	Reg. Pref.	15th	
2010–11	6	1ª Reg.	2nd	
2011–12	5	Reg. Pref.	6th	
2012–13	5	Reg. Pref.	4th	
2013–14	5	Reg. Pref.	6th	
2014–15	5	Reg. Pref.	2nd	
2015–16	4	3ª	20th	
2016–17	5	Reg. Pref.	2nd	
2017–18	4	3ª	7th	

Season	Tier	Division	Place	Copa del Rey
2018–19	4	3ª	7th	
2019–20	4	3ª	13th	
2020–21	4	3ª	4th / 2nd	
2021–22	5	3ª RFEF	6th	
2022–23	5	3ª Fed.	9th	
2023–24	5	3ª Fed.	14th	
2024–25	5	3ª Fed.	1st	
2025–26	4	2ª Fed.	18th	First round
2026–27	5	3ª Fed.		

- 1 season in Segunda Federación
- 7 seasons in Tercera División
- 5 seasons in Tercera Federación/Tercera División RFEF

== Current squad ==
As of 1 March 2026

Note: Flags indicate national team as defined under FIFA eligibility rules; some limited exceptions apply. Players may hold more than one non-FIFA nationality.

No.	Pos.	Nation	Player
1	GK	ESP	Pablo Vargas
2	DF	ESP	Aitor Abad
3	DF	ESP	Julen Quintela
4	DF	ESP	Jon López
5	DF	ESP	Xabi Jauregui
6	MF	ESP	David Aguirre
7	FW	ESP	Diego Marta
9	FW	ESP	Óliver Helguera
10	MF	ESP	Ander Lambea
11	MF	ESP	Álvaro Berzosa
13	GK	ESP	Hodei Oleaga

No.	Pos.	Nation	Player
14	FW	ESP	Markel Gilete
16	MF	ESP	Unai Veiga
17	FW	ESP	Javi González
19	DF	COL	Deiby Ochoa
20	DF	ESP	Álex Rasines
21	MF	ESP	Aritz Acarregui
22	DF	ESP	Hugo Quintana
23	FW	ESP	Jonás Ibañez
24	MF	ESP	Izan Coca
-	FW	ESP	Pablo Lomas
