= CD Coria =

Association football club

Coria
- Full name: Club Deportivo Coria
- Nickname: Celestes (The Sky Blues)
- Founded: 1960; 66 years ago
- Stadium: Estadio La Isla
- Capacity: 1,200
- President: Aurelio Gutiérrez
- Head coach: Rai Rosa
- League: Primera Federación – Group 1
- 2025–26: Segunda Federación – Group 5, 5th of 18 (promoted via play-offs)
Home colours	Away colours

Club Deportivo Coria is a Spanish football club based in Coria, Cáceres, in the autonomous community of Extremadura. Founded in 1960, the club plays in the Primera Federación – Group 1, and holds home games at Estadio La Isla, with a 3,000-seat capacity.

== Season to season ==
Season	Tier	Division	Place	Copa del Rey
1967–68	5	2ª Reg.	5th	
1968–69	5	2ª Reg.	4th	
1969–70	4	1ª Reg.	5th	
1970–71	4	1ª Reg.	3rd	
1971–72	4	1ª Reg.	15th	
1972–73	4	1ª Reg.	17th	
1973–74	4	1ª Reg.	19th	
1974–75	5	1ª Reg.	5th	
1975–76	5	1ª Reg.	10th	
1976–77	5	1ª Reg.	1st	
1977–78	5	Reg. Pref.	14th	
1978–79	5	Reg. Pref.	20th	
1979–80	6	1ª Reg.	8th	
1980–81	5	Reg. Pref.	15th	
1981–82	5	Reg. Pref.	11th	
1982–83	5	Reg. Pref.	14th	
1983–84	5	Reg. Pref.	13th	
1984–85	5	Reg. Pref.	5th	
1985–86	5	Reg. Pref.	5th	
1986–87	5	Reg. Pref.	5th	

Season	Tier	Division	Place	Copa del Rey
1987–88	4	3ª	13th	
1988–89	4	3ª	18th	
1989–90	5	Reg. Pref.	1st	
1990–91	4	3ª	19th	
1991–92	5	Reg. Pref.	15th	
1992–93	5	Reg. Pref.	8th	
1993–94	5	Reg. Pref.	1st	
1994–95	4	3ª	14th	
1995–96	4	3ª	14th	
1996–97	4	3ª	17th	
1997–98	4	3ª	9th	
1998–99	4	3ª	9th	
1999–2000	4	3ª	7th	
2000–01	4	3ª	7th	
2001–02	4	3ª	11th	
2002–03	4	3ª	10th	
2003–04	4	3ª	11th	
2004–05	4	3ª	10th	
2005–06	4	3ª	13th	
2006–07	4	3ª	17th	

Season	Tier	Division	Place	Copa del Rey
2007–08	5	Reg. Pref.	2nd	
2008–09	5	Reg. Pref.	1st	
2009–10	4	3ª	16th	
2010–11	4	3ª	14th	
2011–12	4	3ª	9th	
2012–13	4	3ª	10th	
2013–14	4	3ª	5th	
2014–15	4	3ª	5th	
2015–16	4	3ª	9th	
2016–17	4	3ª	6th	
2017–18	4	3ª	4th	
2018–19	4	3ª	4th	
2019–20	4	3ª	2nd	
2020–21	4	3ª	2nd / 3rd	First round
2021–22	4	2ª RFEF	5th	
2022–23	4	2ª Fed.	13th	Second round
2023–24	5	3ª Fed.	2nd	
2024–25	4	2ª Fed.	7th	First round
2025–26	4	2ª Fed.	5th	
2026–27	3	1ª Fed.		TBD

- 1 season in Primera Federación
- 4 seasons in Segunda Federación/Segunda División RFEF
- 28 seasons in Tercera División
- 1 season in Tercera Federación

== Players ==
As of 4 November 2026

Note: Flags indicate national team as defined under FIFA eligibility rules; some limited exceptions apply. Players may hold more than one non-FIFA nationality.

No.	Pos.	Nation	Player
1	GK	ESP	Aarón Alonso
2	DF	ESP	José Currás
3	DF	ESP	Jacobo Guzmán
4	DF	ESP	Jaime Calleja
5	DF	ESP	Alberto Trapero
6	MF	ESP	Javi Tapia
7	FW	ESP	Iván Ramos
8	MF	ESP	Eduardo Llorente
9	FW	ESP	Pablo Palacín
10	MF	ESP	Sergio Gómez
11	FW	ESP	Álex Toper
13	GK	ESP	Javi Garrido (on loan from Leganés)

No.	Pos.	Nation	Player
14	MF	ESP	Alberto Moreno
15	FW	DOM	Rafa Núñez
16	FW	ESP	Aimar Santiago (on loan from Real Madrid)
17	DF	ESP	Álex Blanco
18	FW	ESP	Josu Gallastegi
19	MF	ESP	Antonio Arcos
20	DF	ESP	Iñaki León
21	DF	ESP	Marco Leiton (on loan from Leganés)
22	DF	DOM	Benji Núñez
23	DF	ESP	Álvaro Domínguez
24	FW	ESP	Diego Morcillo (on loan from Jaén)
25	GK	ESP	Nico López

=== Youth team ===
Note: Flags indicate national team as defined under FIFA eligibility rules; some limited exceptions apply. Players may hold more than one non-FIFA nationality.

No.	Pos.	Nation	Player
28	FW	ESP	Martins Kelvin
30	GK	ESP	Dani Jiménez
