= CDU Malacitano =

Spanish football club

Malacitano
- Full name: Club Deportivo Unión Malacitano
- Founded: 27 June 2025; 13 months ago
- Ground: Estadio Ciudad de Málaga, Málaga, Andalusia, Spain
- Capacity: 10,816
- Chairman: Daniel Pastor
- Manager: José Miguel Campos
- 2025–26: Segunda Federación – Group 4, 9th of 18 (under the official name of La Unión Atlético)
| Home colours | Away colours |

Club Deportivo Unión Malacitano is a Spanish football team based in the city of Málaga in the autonomous community of Andalusia. Founded in 2025, they hold home matches at the Estadio Ciudad de Málaga.

== History ==
In January 2025, a group of businessmen from Málaga became investors in FC La Unión Atlético, a team from the Region of Murcia that played in the Segunda Federación and which needed money due to a lack of support from the city council and local businesses. However, in order to provide financing, the investment group requested that the team be relocated to Andalusia at the end of the season.

Once the 2024–25 season ended, La Unión Atlético began the relocation process. At the end of June 2025, the request was approved by the RFAF and the FFRM, the governing bodies of football in Andalusia and Murcia. The name and city change was therefore accepted, with Club Deportivo Unión Malacitano becoming the new name of the team.

After the move was approved, the team made its official presentation. The club adopted the purple and green colors as its official colors, as they are the colors of Málaga, although the club crest was adapted from the logo of CD Málaga 1903, a team that competes in regional leagues and which will serve as an affiliate due to the fact that most of the CDU Malacitano investors were already involved in that team.

The team also claims to be the city's second team, after Málaga CF, although it does not seek to compete with them. However, the owners of CDU Malacitano had previously attempted to take over ownership of the city's main team. The project was therefore compared to other attempts to supplant the city's traditional club, such as Granada 74 CF.

In August 2025, the team suffered a setback when the Royal Spanish Football Federation rejected the change of name and town from La Unión Atlético to CDU Malacitano. This meant the team had to play its home games in Totana, Murcia, and was forced to officially play under the name La Unión Atlético. However, the board determined that the team would continue training and have its official headquarters in Málaga, having to travel to Totana for each home game.

In June 2026, the Superior Sports Council approved the registration of Malacitano as a SAD in Málaga, pending on the approval of the RFEF to officially change the club's headquarters and name. In the following month, however, the club was denied registration in the fourth division after being considered a "different project" from La Unión Atlético instead of its continuity.

== Stadium ==
Estadio Ciudad de Málaga is a multi-purpose stadium in Málaga, Spain. The facility can accommodate 10,816 spectators. The team announced that it will temporarily play at that stadium.

CDU Malacitano had presented plans to build its own stadium in the future, especially since it will be forced to share the Estadio Ciudad de Málaga with Málaga CF starting in the 2026–27 season due to construction work at La Rosaleda.

== Season to season ==
| Season | Tier | Division | Place | Copa del Rey |
|---|---|---|---|---|
| 2025–26 | 4 | 2ª Fed. | 9th (Note: Officially under the name of La Unión Atlético) | |

- 1 season in Segunda Federación
