= UE Porreres =

Spanish football team

Porreres
- Full name: Unió Esportiva Porreres
- Founded: 1 August 1923; 103 years ago
- Stadium: Ses Forques
- Capacity: 1,000
- President: Guillem Ballester
- Head coach: Jaume Mut
- League: Tercera Federación – Group 11
- 2025–26: Segunda Federación – Group 3, 18th of 18 (relegated)
Home colours	Away colours

Unió Esportiva Porreres is a Spanish football team based in Porreres, Mallorca, in the autonomous community of Balearic Islands. Founded in 1934, it plays in Tercera Federación – Group 11, holding home matches at Camp de Futbol Municipal Ses Forques, with a capacity of 700 people.

== History ==
The first team in the municipality was Porreras Football Club, founded on 1 August 1923 and disappeared in 1928. After six years, the club was refounded on 2 July 1934 as Unión Sportiva Porreras. In 1942, after a period of inactivity, the club returned as Unión Deportiva Porreras, and achieved promotion to Tercera División in 1954.

After spending the 1962–63 season without a senior side, the club spent another two seasons of inactivity before returning in 1966 as Club Deportivo Felipense. The club was named Club Deportivo Porreras during the 1969–70 campaign and Club de Fútbol Porreras in 1970–71 before returning to their previous name.

In 1973, Porreras returned to their former name as UD Porreras, and spent six consecutive seasons in the fourth division before ceasing activities in 1985. In 1990, the club was renamed Unión Deportiva Porreres. In 2003, after spending the previous season without a senior team, the club was renamed Unió Esportiva Porreres.

In July 2015, after another period of inactivity, Porreres returned to action in Tercera Regional de Mallorca.

== Season to season ==
Season	Tier	Division	Place	Copa del Rey
1934–35	—	Regional	—	
1935–36	5	2ª Reg.	4th	
1936–1942	DNP			
1942–43	4	2ª Reg.	4th	
1943–44	4	2ª Reg.	3rd	
1944–45	4	1ª Reg.	8th	
1945–46	5	3ª Reg.		
1946–47	5	3ª Reg.	3rd	
1947–48	5	3ª Reg.	7th	
1948–49	5	3ª Reg.	6th	
1949–50	5	3ª Reg.		
1950–51	5	3ª Reg.		
1951–52	4	1ª Reg.	2nd	
1952–53	4	1ª Reg.	2nd	
1953–54	4	1ª Reg.	4th	
1954–55	3	3ª	7th	
1955–56	3	3ª	10th	
1956–57	3	3ª	17th	
1957–58	3	3ª	7th	
1958–59	3	3ª	14th	

Season	Tier	Division	Place	Copa del Rey
1959–60	4	1ª Reg.	4th	
1960–61	4	1ª Reg.	6th	
1961–62	4	1ª Reg.	3rd	
1962–63	DNP			
1963–64	5	2ª Reg.	5th	
1964–65	5	2ª Reg.		
1965–66	DNP			
1966–67	4	1ª Reg.	13th	
1967–68	5	2ª Reg.	2nd	
1968–69	5	2ª Reg.	2nd	
1969–70	5	2ª Reg.	14th	
1970–71	4	1ª Reg.	15th	
1971–72	5	2ª Reg.	8th	
1972–73	6	2ª Reg.	1st	
1973–74	5	1ª Reg.	1st	
1974–75	4	Reg. Pref.	5th	
1975–76	4	Reg. Pref.	7th	
1976–77	4	Reg. Pref.	2nd	
1977–78	4	3ª	19th	First round
1978–79	5	Reg. Pref.	8th	

Season	Tier	Division	Place	Copa del Rey
1979–80	4	3ª	17th	First round
1980–81	4	3ª	10th	
1981–82	4	3ª	5th	
1982–83	4	3ª	4th	First round
1983–84	4	3ª	10th	First round
1984–85	4	3ª	17th	
1985–1989	DNP			
1989–90	8	3ª Reg.	2nd	
1990–91	7	2ª Reg.	11th	
1991–92	7	2ª Reg.	9th	
1992–93	7	2ª Reg.	1st	
1993–94	6	1ª Reg.	15th	
1994–95	6	1ª Reg.	18th	
1995–96	7	2ª Reg.	4th	
1996–97	7	2ª Reg.	2nd	
1997–98	6	1ª Reg.	4th	
1998–99	6	1ª Reg.	16th	
1999–2000	DNP			
2000–01	8	3ª Reg.	5th	
2001–02	8	3ª Reg.	10th	
2002–03	DNP			

Season	Tier	Division	Place	Copa del Rey
2003–04	8	3ª Reg.	5th	
2004–05	8	3ª Reg.	7th	
2005–06	8	3ª Reg.	9th	
2006–07	8	3ª Reg.	6th	
2007–08	8	3ª Reg.	10th	
2008–09	8	3ª Reg.	1st	
2009–10	7	2ª Reg.	7th	
2010–11	7	2ª Reg.	12th	
2011–2015	DNP			
2015–16	8	3ª Reg.	1st	
2016–17	7	2ª Reg.	8th	
2017–18	7	2ª Reg.	1st	
2018–19	6	1ª Reg.	1st	
2019–20	5	Reg. Pref.	7th	
2020–21	5	Reg. Pref.	6th	
2021–22	6	Reg. Pref.	3rd	
2022–23	6	Reg. Pref.	7th	
2023–24	6	Reg. Pref.	1st	
2024–25	5	3ª Fed.	4th	
2025–26	4	2ª Fed.	18th	
2026–27	5	3ª Fed.		

- 1 season in Segunda Federación
- 12 seasons in Tercera División
- 2 seasons in Tercera Federación

== Current squad ==
As of 10 February 2026

Note: Flags indicate national team as defined under FIFA eligibility rules; some limited exceptions apply. Players may hold more than one non-FIFA nationality.

No.	Pos.	Nation	Player
1	GK	ESP	Pau Socías
2	DF	ESP	Alejandro Marcos
4	DF	ESP	Jorge García
5	DF	ESP	Xisco Garí
6	FW	ESP	Álex Jaraiz
7	FW	ARG	Giuliano Bertino
8	MF	ESP	Miguel Algaba
9	FW	PAR	Rodri Cuenca
10	MF	ESP	Climent Noguera
11	DF	ESP	Jorge Bengoetxea
12	FW	ESP	Rubén de Tomás
13	GK	ESP	Víctor Méndez
14	MF	ESP	Alberto Villapalos

No.	Pos.	Nation	Player
15	DF	ESP	Toni Torregrosa
16	DF	ESP	Antonio Poo
17	MF	SEN	Boubacar Keita
18	DF	ESP	Nacho Recalde
19	FW	ESP	Toni Florit
20	MF	ESP	Albert Sastre
21	MF	ESP	Javi Cobo
23	FW	ESP	Miquel Alorda
24	FW	ESP	Xesc Navalón
25	MF	ESP	Guize Medina
27	FW	ESP	Andreu Binimelis
28	FW	ESP	Iker Silva
