= UD Poblense =

Association football club

Poblense
- Full name: Unión Deportiva Poblense
- Nickname: Poblera
- Founded: 1935
- Ground: Nou Camp, Sa Pobla; Balearic Islands, Spain
- Capacity: 8,000
- President: (Spain) Miquel Bennàssar "Molondro"
- Head coach: (Spain) Óscar Troya
- League: Segunda Federación – Group 3
- 2025–26: Segunda Federación – Group 3, 3rd of 18
- Website: udpoblense.com
Home colours	Away colours

Unión Deportiva Poblense is a Spanish football team based in Sa Pobla, Mallorca, in the autonomous community of Balearic Islands. Founded in 1935, it plays in Segunda Federación – Group 3.

Team colours are shirt with blue and red vertical stripes, blue shorts and socks.

== History ==
Poblense played from 1982 to 1989 in Segunda División B. Since their last relegation, the club continues playing in Tercera División.

== Season to season ==
Season	Tier	Division	Place	Copa del Rey
1939–40	5	2ª Reg.	3rd	
1940–41	5	2ª Reg.	3rd	
1941–42	4	2ª Reg.	1st	
1942–43	3	1ª Reg.	3rd	
1943–44	4	1ª Reg.	2nd	
1944–45	4	1ª Reg.	3rd	
1945–46	4	1ª Reg.	3rd	
1946–47	4	1ª Reg.	3rd	
1947–48	4	1ª Reg.	1st	
1948–49	4	1ª Reg.	2nd	
1949–50	4	1ª Reg.	1st	
1950–51	4	1ª Reg.	1st	
1951–52	4	1ª Reg.	5th	
1952–53	4	1ª Reg.	11th	
1953–54	4	1ª Reg.	1st	
1954–55	3	3ª	4th	
1955–56	3	3ª	3rd	
1956–57	3	3ª	9th	
1957–58	3	3ª	16th	
1958–59	4	1ª Reg.	1st	

Season	Tier	Division	Place	Copa del Rey
1959–60	3	3ª	7th	
1960–61	3	3ª	8th	
1961–62	3	3ª	9th	
1962–63	4	1ª Reg.	2nd	
1963–64	4	1ª Reg.	2nd	
1964–65	3	3ª	8th	
1965–66	3	3ª	10th	
1966–67	3	3ª	12th	
1967–68	3	3ª	6th	
1968–69	3	3ª	19th	
1969–70	4	1ª Reg.	1st	
1970–71	3	3ª	10th	Second round
1971–72	3	3ª	3rd	Second round
1972–73	3	3ª	16th	First round
1973–74	4	Reg. Pref.	1st	
1974–75	3	3ª	19th	Second round
1975–76	4	Reg. Pref.	2nd	
1976–77	3	3ª	13th	First round
1977–78	4	3ª	13th	First round
1978–79	4	3ª	7th	Third round

Season	Tier	Division	Place	Copa del Rey
1979–80	4	3ª	2nd	Second round
1980–81	4	3ª	1st	Second round
1981–82	4	3ª	1st	First round
1982–83	3	2ª B	15th	Second round
1983–84	3	2ª B	12th	
1984–85	3	2ª B	14th	
1985–86	3	2ª B	6th	
1986–87	3	2ª B	22nd	Second round
1987–88	3	2ª B	15th	Third round
1988–89	3	2ª B	18th	First round
1989–90	4	3ª	14th	
1990–91	4	3ª	7th	
1991–92	4	3ª	17th	
1992–93	4	3ª	5th	
1993–94	4	3ª	9th	
1994–95	4	3ª	4th	
1995–96	4	3ª	4th	
1996–97	4	3ª	5th	
1997–98	4	3ª	7th	
1998–99	4	3ª	2nd	

Season	Tier	Division	Place	Copa del Rey
1999–2000	4	3ª	9th	
2000–01	4	3ª	11th	
2001–02	4	3ª	8th	
2002–03	4	3ª	4th	
2003–04	4	3ª	4th	
2004–05	4	3ª	8th	
2005–06	4	3ª	16th	
2006–07	4	3ª	3rd	
2007–08	4	3ª	12th	
2008–09	4	3ª	7th	
2009–10	4	3ª	15th	
2010–11	4	3ª	2nd	
2011–12	4	3ª	9th	
2012–13	4	3ª	2nd	
2013–14	4	3ª	6th	
2014–15	4	3ª	6th	
2015–16	4	3ª	5th	
2016–17	4	3ª	2nd	
2017–18	4	3ª	2nd	
2018–19	4	3ª	3rd	First round

Season	Tier	Division	Place	Copa del Rey
2019–20	4	3ª	1st	
2020–21	3	2ª B	9th / 3rd	First round
2021–22	5	3ª RFEF	3rd	
2022–23	5	3ª Fed.	4th	
2023–24	5	3ª Fed.	3rd	
2024–25	5	3ª Fed.	1st	First round
2025–26	4	2ª Fed.	3rd	First round
2026–27	4	2ª Fed.		First round

- 8 seasons in Segunda División B
- 2 seasons in Segunda Federación
- 53 seasons in Tercera División
- 4 seasons in Tercera Federación/Tercera División RFEF

== Honours ==
- Tercera División: 1980–81, 1981–82, 2019–20
- Categorías Regionales: 1941–42, 1947–48, 1949–50, 1950–51, 1953–54, 1958–59, 1969–70, 1973–74
- Baleares Championship: 1947–48, 1949–50, 1953–54

== Current squad ==
As of 10 February 2026

Note: Flags indicate national team as defined under FIFA eligibility rules; some limited exceptions apply. Players may hold more than one non-FIFA nationality.

No.	Pos.	Nation	Player
1	GK	ESP	Vicente Sabater
2	DF	ESP	Victor Villar
3	DF	ESP	Pep Payeras
4	DF	ESP	Marc García
5	MF	ARG	Thomas Giaquinto
6	DF	ESP	Joan Salvá
7	DF	ESP	Onofre Riera
8	MF	ESP	Miguel Soler
9	FW	ESP	Joan Prohens
10	MF	ESP	Dieguito
11	FW	ESP	Aitor Pons

No.	Pos.	Nation	Player
15	FW	ESP	Marco Alarcón
16	MF	ESP	Martí Payeras
17	MF	ESP	Francesc Fullana
18	MF	ESP	Gori López
19	FW	ESP	Alberto Fernández
20	FW	ESP	Iván Ayllón
21	FW	ESP	Dani Nieto
22	MF	ESP	Luis Montiel
23	FW	ESP	Toni Penyafort
24	FW	ESP	Andrés García
30	GK	ESP	Felquin Cruz

== Famous players ==
- (Spain) Cundi
- (Equatorial Guinea) (Spain) Rubén Epitié
- (Spain) Ivan Ramis
- (Spain) Martí Crespí
- (Spain) Miquel Buades
- (Spain) Molondro
- (Spain) Joan Jordan
- (Spain) Joan Campins

== Famous coaches ==
- (Spain) Lorenzo Serra Ferrer

== Stadium ==
The Nou Camp de Sa Pobla was inaugurated on January 17, 1977, although the first official match took place on the 29th, a 0–0 draw with Ontinyent CF. It was built by architect J. Jesús Pou Usallán with an 8,000-seat capacity. The surface of the playing field is natural grass and has a size of 105 x 74 m. The main tier of the stadium is covered, and its gallery is located in one room for the press.
