= SD Logroñés =

Association football team in Spain

- Full name: Sociedad Deportiva Logroñés
- Nicknames: Blanquirrojos; Logroñés
- Short name: SDL
- Founded: 4 June 2009; 17 years ago
- Stadium: Estadio Las Gaunas
- Capacity: 16,000
- President: Eduardo Guerra Díez
- Head coach: Albert Aguilá
- League: Segunda Federación – Group 2
- 2025–26: Segunda Federación – Group 2, 13th of 18
- Website: sdlogrones.com
| Home colours | Away colours | Third colours |

Sociedad Deportiva Logroñés is a Spanish football team based in Logroño, in the autonomous community of La Rioja. Founded in 2009, it plays in Segunda Federación – Group 2. Team colours are white-and-red shirts and black shorts.

== History ==
Sociedad Deportiva Logroñés was founded in 2009, following the serious economic problems which led to the demise of historical Riojan club CD Logroñés. 4 June 2009 is considered the day of the club's founding.

Eventually, as Club Deportivo folded, the new team took its place in the regional leagues, starting in 2009–10. In its debut season Sociedad Deportiva finished as champions, earning promotion to Group 16 in Tercera División.

In its first season in the fourth level, the team finished the regular season in second position, being ousted in the playoffs by Gimnástica Segoviana CF. The following campaign was much more successful, as Sociedad won its group and promoted for the first time ever to Segunda División B after eliminating Peña Sport FC in Tafalla, following a 0–3 loss (but 4–3 aggregate win) on 27 May 2012. In 2014, the team returned to the fourth division and finished 3rd in the 2014-15 season there.

In February 2019, Albert Aguilà was appointed the head coach of the club.

== Season to season ==
| Season | Tier | Division | Place | Copa del Rey |
|---|---|---|---|---|
| 2009–10 | 5 | Reg. Pref. | 1st | |
| 2010–11 | 4 | 3ª | 2nd | |
| 2011–12 | 4 | 3ª | 1st | |
| 2012–13 | 3 | 2ª B | 10th | Second round |
| 2013–14 | 3 | 2ª B | 17th | |
| 2014–15 | 4 | 3ª | 3rd | |
| 2015–16 | 4 | 3ª | 2nd | |
| 2016–17 | 4 | 3ª | 3rd | |
| 2017–18 | 4 | 3ª | 2nd | |
| 2018–19 | 4 | 3ª | 2nd | |
| 2019–20 | 4 | 3ª | 1st | First round |
| 2020–21 | 3 | 2ª B | 3rd / 6th | First round |
| 2021–22 | 3 | 1ª RFEF | 13th | First round |
| 2022–23 | 3 | 1ª Fed. | 9th | |
| 2023–24 | 3 | 1ª Fed. | 19th | |
| 2024–25 | 4 | 2ª Fed. | 2nd | |
| 2025–26 | 4 | 2ª Fed. | 13th | First round |
| 2026–27 | 4 | 2ª Fed. | | |

- 3 seasons in Primera Federación/Primera División RFEF
- 3 seasons in Segunda División B
- 3 seasons in Segunda Federación
- 8 seasons in Tercera División
- 1 season in Regional Preferente

== Current squad ==
As of October 2026

Note: Flags indicate national team as defined under FIFA eligibility rules; some limited exceptions apply. Players may hold more than one non-FIFA nationality.

| No. | Pos. | Nation | Player |
|---|---|---|---|
| 1 | GK | ESP | Kike Royo |
| 3 | DF | ESP | Julen Hualde |
| 4 | DF | ESP | Ander Fernández (on loan from Basconia) |
| 5 | DF | ESP | Simón Lecea |
| 6 | MF | ESP | Diego Núñez |
| 7 | FW | ESP | Dani Fernández |
| 8 | MF | ESP | David Sánchez |
| 9 | FW | MLI | Moha Traoré |
| 12 | DF | ESP | Samu Clavero |
| 13 | GK | ESP | Iván Fernández |

| No. | Pos. | Nation | Player |
|---|---|---|---|
| 14 | MF | ESP | Joselu Guerra |
| 15 | MF | ESP | Iñaki Telletxea |
| 16 | MF | ESP | Dani Santafé |
| 17 | DF | ESP | Arman Lazcano |
| 18 | DF | ESP | Iñigo Zubiri |
| 20 | FW | ESP | David San Martin |
| 21 | FW | ESP | Pablo Aguinaga |
| 22 | DF | ESP | Aimar Olarra |
| 23 | FW | ESP | Dani Sancho |
| 24 | MF | ESP | Unai Ayensa |

=== Reserve team ===
Note: Flags indicate national team as defined under FIFA eligibility rules; some limited exceptions apply. Players may hold more than one non-FIFA nationality.

| No. / Pos. / Nation / Player | No. / Pos. / Nation / Player |

== Stadium ==
Logroñés plays home games at Estadio Mundial 82, with a capacity of 1,500 spectators.
