= Puente Genil FC =

Association football club in Spain

Puente Genil
- Full name: Salerm Cosmetics Puente Genil Fútbol Club
- Founded: 1939; 87 years ago
- Stadium: Estadio Manuel Polinario "Poli"
- Capacity: 2,000
- President: Francisco Javier Cabezas Roa
- Head coach: Álvaro Cejudo
- League: Segunda Federación – Group 3
- 2025–26: Segunda Federación – Group 4, 14th of 18
- Website: salermcosmeticspuentegenilfc.com
Home colours	Away colours

Salerm Cosmetics Puente Genil Fútbol Club, commonly referred to as Puente Genil, is a Spanish football team based in Puente Genil, in the autonomous community of Andalusia. They currently play in the Segunda Federación – Group 3.

== History ==
Founded in 1939 as Genil Racing Club, the club changed its name to Puente Genil Balompié in 1941 and subsequently to CD Pontanés in 1950. It first reached the national competitions in 1955, playing in Tercera División and achieving immediate promotion after finishing fourth.

During the club's first season in Segunda División, it changed its name to Puente Genil CF. After suffering immediate relegation, the club also dropped a division in 1960 and folded in 1973.

In 1988 another Puente Genil CF was founded, after the merger of Puente Genil Industrial (founded in 1974) and CD Pontanés. The club played three seasons in the fourth category before being dissolved in 1995.

Puente Genil FC started to play in the regional leagues in 2000, and in 2010 the club changed its name to CD AD San Fermín. A partnership with cosmetics industry Salerm Cosmetics followed, and the club's name was changed officially to CD AD San Fermín Salerm Cosmetics. In 2018 the name was changed to Salerm Cosmetics Puente Genil FC mainly due to its previous history.

=== Club background ===
- Genil Racing Club (1939–1941)
- Puente Genil Balompié (1941–1950)
- Club Deportivo Pontanés (1950–1956)
- Puente Genil Club de Fútbol (1956–1960)
- Asociación Deportiva Puente Genil (1960–1971)
- Asociación Deportiva Puente Genil Industrial (1971–1980)
- Puente Genil Industrial Club de Fútbol (1980–1983)
- Puente Genil Club de Fútbol (1983–1995)
- Puente Genil Fútbol Club (2000–2010)
- Club Deportivo Asociación Deportiva San Fermín (2010–2013)
- Salerm Cosmetics Asociación Deportiva San Fermín (2013–2018)
- Salerm Cosmetics Puente Genil Fútbol Club (2018–)

== Season to season ==
=== Puente Genil (1939–1960) ===
Season	Tier	Division	Place	Copa del Rey
1941–42	3	1ª Reg.	6th	
1942–1954	—	Regional	—	
1954–55	4	1ª Reg.	4th	
1955–56	3	3ª	4th	
1956–57	2	2ª	19th	
1957–58	3	3ª	5th	
1958–59	3	3ª	14th	
1959–60	3	3ª	16th	

- 1 season in Segunda División
- 4 seasons in Tercera División

=== Puente Genil Industrial CF ===
Season	Tier	Division	Place	Copa del Rey
1960–68	—	Regional	—	
1968–69	4	1ª Reg.	8th	
1969–70	4	1ª Reg.	3rd	
1970–71	4	1ª Reg.	12th	
1971–72	4	1ª Reg.	9th	
1972–73	4	1ª Reg.	6th	
1973–74	4	1ª Reg.	7th	
1974–75	4	1ª Reg.	9th	

Season	Tier	Division	Place	Copa del Rey
1975–76	4	Reg. Pref.	22nd	
1976–77	5	1ª Reg.	7th	
1977–78	6	1ª Reg.	6th	
1978–79	6	1ª Reg.	2nd	
1979–80	5	Reg. Pref.	16th	
1980–81	5	Reg. Pref.	17th	
1981–82	6	1ª Reg.	12th	
1982–83	6	1ª Reg.	6th	

=== Puente Genil (1983–1995) ===
Season	Tier	Division	Place	Copa del Rey
1983–84	5	Reg. Pref.	12th	
1984–85	5	Reg. Pref.	17th	
1985–86	6	1ª Reg.	10th	
1986–87	5	Reg. Pref.	7th	
1987–88	5	Reg. Pref.	13th	
1988–89	5	Reg. Pref.	16th	

Season	Tier	Division	Place	Copa del Rey
1989–90	6	1ª Reg.	1st	
1990–91	5	Reg. Pref.	6th	
1991–92	5	Reg. Pref.	2nd	
1992–93	4	3ª	11th	
1993–94	4	3ª	14th	
1994–95	4	3ª	21st	

- 3 seasons in Tercera División

=== Puente Genil (1994–) ===
Season	Tier	Division	Place	Copa del Rey
2000–01	6	1ª Reg.	12th	
2001–02	6	1ª Reg.	3rd	
2002–03	5	Reg. Pref.	16th	
2003–04	6	Reg. Pref.	1st	
2004–05	6	Reg. Pref.	5th	
2005–06	6	Reg. Pref.	13th	
2006–07	7	1ª Reg.	5th	
2007–08	7	1ª Reg.	2nd	
2008–09	6	Reg. Pref.	8th	
2009–10	6	Reg. Pref.	4th	
2010–11	6	Reg. Pref.	8th	
2011–12	6	Reg. Pref.	9th	
2012–13	6	Reg. Pref.	4th	
2013–14	6	Reg. Pref.	9th	
2014–15	6	2ª And.	1st	
2015–16	5	1ª And.	6th	
2016–17	5	Div. Hon.	2nd	
2017–18	4	3ª	8th	
2018–19	4	3ª	11th	
2019–20	4	3ª	8th	

Season	Tier	Division	Place	Copa del Rey
2020–21	4	3ª	3rd / 5th	
2021–22	5	3ª RFEF	7th	
2022–23	5	3ª Fed.	5th	
2023–24	5	3ª Fed.	6th	
2024–25	5	3ª Fed.	1st	
2025–26	4	2ª Fed.	14th	First round
2026–27	4	2ª Fed.		

- 2 seasons in Segunda Federación
- 4 seasons in Tercera División
- 4 seasons in Tercera Federación/Tercera División RFEF
