= Francesc Fullana =

Spanish footballer

Personal information
- Full name: Francesc Fullana Ginard
- Date of birth: 9 October 1989 (age 37)
- Place of birth: Montuïri, Spain
- Height: 1.75 m (5 ft 9 in)
- Position: Midfielder

Team information
- Current team: Poblense
- Number: 17

Youth career
- Montuïri
- 2000–2008: Mallorca

Senior career*
Years	Team	Apps	(Gls)
2008–2009	Mallorca B	18	(1)
2009–2011	Sporting Mahonés	42	(1)
2011–2012	Atlético Baleares	23	(0)
2012–2013	Constància	35	(7)
2013–2014	Llagostera	33	(1)
2014–2019	Atlético Baleares	167	(32)
2019–2020	Ponferradina	7	(0)
2020–2022	Gimnàstic	40	(2)
2022	UCAM Murcia	19	(0)
2022–2023	Cornellà	34	(6)
2023–2024	San Fernando	24	(0)
2024–2025	Ourense CF	30	(6)
2025–	Poblense	32	(9)
- * Club domestic league appearances and goals as of 7 May 2026

Francesc Fullana Ginard (born 9 October 1989) is a Spanish footballer who plays as a central midfielder for Segunda Federación club Poblense.

== Club career ==
Born in Montuïri, Majorca, Balearic Islands, Fullana was a RCD Mallorca youth graduate, and made his senior debut with the reserves in the 2008–09 season, in Tercera División. On 12 August 2009, he signed for Segunda División B side Sporting Mahonés CF.

Fullana continued to appear in the third division in the following campaigns, representing CD Atlético Baleares (two stints), CE Constància and UE Llagostera. On 17 July 2019, he moved to SD Ponferradina, newly promoted to Segunda División, on a one-year deal.

Fullana made his professional debut on 1 September 2019, coming on as a late substitute for Yuri de Souza in a 4–0 home routing of CD Tenerife. He left the club after his contract expired, and signed a two-year deal with third division side Gimnàstic de Tarragona on 25 September 2020.
