= Dani Santafé =

Spanish footballer

Personal information
- Full name: Daniel Santafé Mena
- Date of birth: 3 July 1997 (age 29)
- Place of birth: Valtierra, Spain
- Height: 1.80 m (5 ft 11 in)
- Position: Midfielder

Team information
- Current team: SD Logroñés
- Number: 16

Youth career
- Osasuna

Senior career*
Years	Team	Apps	(Gls)
2016–2017	Iruña		
2017–2021	Osasuna B	103	(5)
2021–2023	Asteras Tripolis	23	(0)
2023–2024	Linense	26	(1)
2025–	SD Logroñés	23	(0)
- * Club domestic league appearances and goals as of 7 May 2026

Daniel Santafé Mena (born 3 July 1997) is a Spanish professional footballer who plays as a midfielder for Segunda Federación club SD Logroñés.
