= Daniel Mesonero =

Spanish footballer

Personal information
- Full name: Daniel Mesonero Miguel
- Date of birth: 3 September 2005 (age 21)
- Place of birth: Madrid, Spain
- Height: 1.73 m (5 ft 8 in)
- Position: Midfielder

Team information
- Current team: Real Madrid B
- Number: 22

Youth career
- 2013–2015: Moratalaz
- 2015–2019: Rayo Vallecano
- 2019–2025: Real Madrid

Senior career*
Years	Team	Apps	(Gls)
2025–2026	Real Madrid C	17	(1)
2025–	Real Madrid Castilla	16	(1)
2026–	Real Madrid	0	(0)

International career^{‡}
2024	Spain U19	2	(1)
- * Club domestic league appearances and goals as of 7 May 2026 ‡ National team caps and goals as of 03:01, 12 January 2026 (UTC)

Daniel Mesonero Miguel (born 3 September 2005), sometimes known as Dani Meso, is a Spanish professional footballer who plays as a midfielder for Real Madrid.

== Club career ==
Mesonero is a product of the youth academies of the Spanish clubs Moratalaz, Rayo Vallecano and Real Madrid. On 21 May 2024, he extended his contract with Real Madrid until 2028. In July 2024, he injured his cruciate ligament while training with the senior Real Madrid team. For the 2025–26 season, he started playing with Real Madrid C, and shortly started playing with Real Madrid Castilla. He debuted with the senior Real Madrid team as a substitute in a 6–1 UEFA Champions League win over Monaco on 20 January 2026.

== International career ==
In February 2024, Mesonero was called up to the Spain U19s for a set of friendlies.
