= Multiple Equivalent Simultaneous Offers =

Negotiation strategy

Multiple Equivalent Simultaneous Offers (MESO) is a technique used in negotiations. The principle behind MESO is to make multiple offers that are mutually equal in one's mind. By doing this, one can better understand one's partner in a negotiation—his or her interests, expectations, etc.

The acronym MESO is used because "of its etymological origins in Greek to mean both 'combining form' and 'middle', suggesting a balance between states. MESOs allow negotiators to collect and integrate complex information, to successfully combine aggressiveness with cooperation, persistence with flexibility. This technique allows negotiators to set the state for the negotiations, to play detective, and to achieve outcomes that would otherwise be difficult to capture."

== Strategy ==
Robb Mandelbaum of Inc. Magazine wrote: “One way to learn more about your counterpart's preferences is to offer a choice among proposals that emphasize different elements of the deal . . . According to the reactions you get, you can reshuffle the mix with a new set of offers. The maneuver can generate goodwill for your flexibility, even as you pursue an aggressive negotiating agenda.” MESOs are used by experienced negotiators in order to create the best possible package for both parties. Even if one of the proposed offers is not accepted, this approach will help each party understand one another.

There are three steps to successfully applying the MESO strategy to your negotiation:

1. Identify and Prioritize Issues. Estimate their weights (relative value) to both parties. There may be some things that are important to you that may be less important to your counterpart.
2. Identify Different Likely Outcomes for Each Issue. Set one as the standard, and then set relative values of the others. Assigning point values is one way of determining whether one package is, on the whole, more appealing than another.
3. Create at Least Three Equivalent Offers. These offers should have approximately equal point values, according to the points assigned in step two.

MESO strategy requires multiple issues with realistic alternative outcomes. MESOs are better utilized if there are multiple interests, perhaps in a package deal. It would not be realistic if only one variable is under negotiation, such as a basic salary negotiation. This strategy can also be a complex process—discussing a variety of issues can lead to confusion. Lastly, a MESO is only beneficial if the party offering the multiple offers is honest—it requires that party to reveal some of its own interests.

== Advantages ==
There are various advantages to using a MESO in a negotiation. Not only does it help the negotiator gather information about the other side's relative priorities, but it also proves as an anchoring device. It also helps you to be aggressive while showing signs of cooperation and flexibility.

“Presenting more than one offer at a time increases the other side’s satisfaction as well as the odds that an agreement will be implemented. Research shows that negotiators who use MESOs achieve better outcomes than those who make a single packaged offer, without sacrificing relationships or losing credibility.”

"Making MESOs has a number of advantages over simply making a single package offer. MESOs are beneficial because they allow negotiators to collect information while being persistent and aggressive at the bargaining table, but also to be perceived as being flexible and accommodating."

There are advantages for the counterpart in a negotiation when it comes to MESOs. Generally, others prefer to be given choices. Many options are preferable to one single offer. One MESO is likely to be more appealing, or a greater value, than the other options. To the counterpart, this more appealing MESO can lead to further discussion and, ultimately, settlement. This also offers the counterpart an opportunity for input wherein they can discuss values, weights, interests, etc.

== Scholarly research ==
A number of scholars from various universities have conducted studies and published articles related to MESOs. "Negotiation theory and research has articulated that in multi-issue negotiations, making package offers is superior in achieving integrative outcomes than negotiation each issue sequentially."Furthermore, research has shown that the negotiator who makes an aggressive first offer tends to secure better outcomes than those who respond to the offer.

While there is not a fixed number on the preferred number of offers, it is generally accepted not to present any more than three offers at a time.

According to professors Victoria Husted Medvec (from Northwestern University) and Adam Galinsky (from Columbia University), three equivalent offers can be a good strategy; “they describe a software company that began initiating in financial negotiations by presenting three equivalent software packages to its clients at once: for example, a $1 million package with payment in 30 days, the same software for $1.5 million with payment in 120 days, or an enhanced package for $1.35 million with a 30-day payment.” This strategy received a positive response from the customers, and profits rose.
