= FC La Unión Atlético =

La Unión Atlético
- Full name: Fútbol Club La Unión Atlético
- Founded: 2010
- Dissolved: July 2026
- Ground: Municipal Juan Cayuela, Totana, Murcia, Spain
- Capacity: 2.500.
- Chairman: Julián Luna
- Manager: José Miguel Campos
- 2025–26: Segunda Federación – Group 4, 9th of 18
Home colours	Away colours

Fútbol Club La Unión Atlético was a Spanish football team based in Málaga, in Andalucía but officially registered in the Region of Murcia. Founded in 2010, they last played in Segunda Federación – Group 4, holding home matches at Municipal Juan Cayuela in Totana.

== History ==
Founded in 2010 as Torre Pacheco Fútbol Club Pinatar in San Pedro del Pinatar, the club took the place of Club Deportivo Dolores Torre Pacheco and started playing in the Preferente Autonómica, fifth tier. The club were renamed to Fútbol Club Pinatar in 2011, and to Fútbol Club Pinatar Arena in the following year due to sponsorship reasons.

Pinatar Arena achieved their first-ever promotion to Tercera División in 2014, and moved back to their previous name FC Pinatar in the following year. In 2018, the club moved to La Unión and were renamed to Fútbol Club La Unión Atlético, due to financial problems.

On 4 June 2023, La Unión Atlético achieved promotion to Segunda Federación for the first time ever, after defeating L'Entregu CF in the play-offs.

In January 2025, the club sought new investors due to a lack of support from the local government and business community. A group of investors contributed money to the club, but in exchange for moving the team to Málaga at the end of the season.

Once the 2024–25 season ended, La Unión Atlético began the relocation process. At the end of June 2025, the request was approved by the RFAF and the FFRM, the governing bodies of football in Andalusia and Murcia. The team was relocated to Málaga and renamed CDU Malacitano.

In August 2025, the Royal Spanish Football Federation rejected the move to Málaga and the change of name from La Unión Atlético to CDU Malacitano. This meant the team has to play its home games in Murcia, and is forced to officially play under the name La Unión Atlético during the entire 2025–26 Segunda Federación. In June 2026, the Superior Sports Council approved the registration of Malacitano as a SAD in Málaga, pending on the approval of the RFEF to officially change the club's headquarters and name.

In July 2026, La Unión Atlético officially ceased activities after Malacitano was denied registration in the fourth division.

== Season to season ==
- As FC Pinatar Arena

Season	Tier	Division	Place	Copa del Rey
2010–11	5	Pref. Aut.	4th	
2011–12	5	Pref. Aut.	8th	
2012–13	5	Pref. Aut.	5th	
2013–14	5	Pref. Aut.	3rd	
2014–15	4	3ª	9th	
2015–16	4	3ª	15th	
2016–17	4	3ª	17th	
2017–18	4	3ª	6th	

- As FC La Unión Atlético

Season	Tier	Division	Place	Copa del Rey
2018–19	4	3ª	19th	
2019–20	5	Pref. Aut.	4th	
2020–21	4	3ª	4th / 1st	
2021–22	5	3ª RFEF	5th	
2022–23	5	3ª Fed.	2nd	
2023–24	4	2ª Fed.	11th	
2024–25	4	2ª Fed.	2nd	
2025–26	4	2ª Fed.	9th (Note: See also: CDU Malacitano)	First round

- 3 seasons in Segunda Federación
- 6 seasons in Tercera División
- 2 seasons in Tercera Federación/Tercera División RFEF
