= 2025–26 Segunda Federación =

Segunda Federación
- Season: 2025–26
- Dates: 6 September 2025 – 31 May 2026
- Promoted: Águilas; Coria; Deportivo Fabril; Extremadura; Jaén; UD Logroñés; UD Ourense; Rayo Majadahonda; Real Unión; Sant Andreu
- Relegated: Alfaro; Almería B Andratx; Atlètic Lleida; Atlético Malagueño; Beasain; Burgos Promesas; Deportivo Aragón; Ejea; Fuenlabrada; Ibiza Islas Pitiusas; Langreo; Lealtad; Melilla; Moscardó; Mutilvera; Porreres; Quintanar del Rey; Rayo Vallecano B Sarriana; Sámano; Socuéllamos; Torrent; Xerez Deportivo
- Top goalscorer: Iñigo Alayeto (21 goals)

The 2025–26 Segunda Federación season is the fifth for the Segunda Federación, the fourth highest level in the Spanish football league system. Ninety teams participate, divided into five groups of eighteen clubs each based on geographical proximity. In each group, the champions are automatically promoted to Primera Federación, and the second to fifth placers will play promotion play-offs. The last five teams in each group are relegated to the Tercera Federación; in addition, the four worst teams classified 13th in their group play play-offs to define the last two relegation places.

== Overview before the season ==
A total of 90 teams joined the league: ten relegated from the 2024–25 Primera Federación, 52 retained from the 2024–25 Segunda Federación and 28 promoted from the 2024–25 Tercera Federación. RFEF released the groups on 27 June 2025.

On 28 June 2025 La Unión Atlético was relocated from La Unión, Murcia to Málaga and renamed Malacitano. On 3 July, Lleida was administratively relegated to Tercera Federación due to an € 288,920.94 debt with players and managers. Six days later, Atlètic Lleida was confirmed to take their place as the best-placed team amongst the ones which showed interest for the spot (Badalona, L'Hospitalet and Toledo).

Teams relegated from 2024–25 Primera Federación

- Alcoyano
- Amorebieta
- Barcelona Atlètic
- Fuenlabrada
- Gimnástica Segoviana
- Intercity
- Recreativo
- Real Unión
- Sestao River
- Yeclano

Teams retained from 2024–25 Segunda Federación

- Águilas
- Alavés B
- Alfaro
- Almería B
- Andratx
- Atlético Antoniano
- Atlético Baleares
- Ávila
- Barbastro
- Bergantiños
- Conquense
- Coria
- Coruxo
- Deportivo Aragón
- Deportivo Fabril
- Eibar B
- Ejea
- Elche Ilicitano
- Espanyol B
- Estepona
- Gernika
- Getafe B
- Ibiza Islas Pitiusas
- Langreo
- Linares
- SD Logroñés
- UD Logroñés
- Malacitano
- Marino Luanco
- Melilla
- Minera
- Moscardó
- Navalcarnero
- Numancia
- Olot
- Orihuela
- Rayo Cantabria
- Rayo Majadahonda
- Real Madrid C
- Salamanca
- San Sebastián de los Reyes
- Sant Andreu
- Tenerife B
- Terrassa
- Torrent
- Tudelano
- UCAM Murcia
- Utebo
- Valencia Mestalla
- Valladolid Promesas
- Xerez
- Xerez Deportivo

Teams promoted from 2024–25 Tercera Federación

- Alcalá
- Atlètic Lleida
- Atlético Astorga
- Atlético Malagueño
- Basconia
- Beasain
- Burgos Promesas
- Castellón B
- Ebro
- Extremadura
- Girona B
- Jaén
- Las Palmas Atlético
- Lealtad
- Lorca Deportiva
- Mutilvera
- Náxara
- UD Ourense
- Oviedo Vetusta
- Poblense
- Porreres
- Puente Genil
- Quintanar del Rey
- Rayo Vallecano B
- Reus FCR
- Sámano
- Sarriana
- Socuéllamos

== Group 1 ==
Location of teams in 2025–26 Segunda Federación – Group 1

Team	Home city	Autonomous Community	Stadium	Capacity
Atlético Astorga	Astorga	Castile and León	La Eragudina	2,332
Ávila	Ávila	Castile and León	Adolfo Suárez	6,000
Bergantiños	Carballo	Galicia	As Eiroas	5,000
Burgos Promesas	Burgos	Castile and León	Castañares	500
Coruxo	Vigo	Galicia	O Vao	2,200
Deportivo Fabril	Abegondo	Galicia	Cidade Deportiva de Abegondo	1,000
Gimnástica Segoviana	Segovia	Castile and León	La Albuera	6,000
Langreo	Langreo	Asturias	Ganzábal	4,024
Lealtad	Villaviciosa	Asturias	Les Caleyes	3,000
Marino Luanco	Luanco	Asturias	Miramar	3,500
Numancia	Soria	Castile and León	Los Pajaritos	8,261
UD Ourense	Ourense	Galicia	O Couto	5,659
Oviedo Vetusta	Oviedo	Asturias	El Requexón	3,000
Rayo Cantabria	Santander	Cantabria	La Albericia	600
Salamanca	Salamanca	Castile and León	Helmántico	17,341
Sámano	Sámano	Cantabria	Vallegón	1,000
Sarriana	Sarria	Galicia	Municipal de Ribela	1,000
Valladolid Promesas	Valladolid	Castile and León	Anexos José Zorrilla	1,500

=== League table ===
Pos	Team	Pld	W	D	L	GF	GA	GD	Pts	Qualification
1	Deportivo Fabril (Note: Numancia awarded a 3–0 victory in their Round 15 match against Deportivo Fabril after the latter fielded an ineligible player. The match originally ended 1–2.) (C, P)	34	20	9	5	59	22	+37	69	Promotion to Primera Federación
2	Oviedo Vetusta	34	16	10	8	50	35	+15	58	Qualification for the promotion play-offs
3	Numancia	34	15	11	8	46	31	+15	56	Qualification for the promotion play-offs and Copa del Rey
4	UD Ourense (P)	34	15	10	9	40	34	+6	55	Qualification for the promotion play-offs and Copa del Rey
5	Coruxo	34	15	7	12	46	37	+9	52	Qualification for the promotion play-offs and Copa del Rey
6	Gimnástica Segoviana	34	14	9	11	37	36	+1	51	Qualification for the Copa del Rey
7	Ávila	34	14	8	12	48	52	−4	50 (Note: Ávila finished ahead of Salamanca on head-to-head goal difference: Salamanca 1–3 Ávila, Ávila 1–2 Salamanca)	Qualification for the Copa del Rey
8	Salamanca	34	14	8	12	43	36	+7	50	
9	Rayo Cantabria	34	11	15	8	63	50	+13	48 (Note: Rayo Cantabria finished ahead of Bergantiños on goal difference.)	
10	Bergantiños	34	13	9	12	44	37	+7	48	
11	Atlético Astorga	34	12	9	13	41	43	−2	45 (Note: Head-to-head points: Atlético Astorga 9 pts, Marino Luanco 6 pts, Valladolid Promesas 3 pts)	
12	Marino Luanco	34	11	12	11	31	26	+5	45	
13	Valladolid Promesas	34	12	9	13	59	58	+1	45	
14	Langreo (R)	34	11	10	13	35	41	−6	43	Relegation to Tercera Federación
15	Sarriana (R)	34	11	7	16	42	42	0	40	Relegation to Tercera Federación
16	Burgos Promesas (R)	34	8	12	14	38	55	−17	36	Relegation to Tercera Federación
17	Lealtad (R)	34	7	7	20	31	54	−23	28	Relegation to Tercera Federación
18	Sámano (R)	34	3	6	25	23	87	−64	15	Relegation to Tercera Federación

Rules for classification: 1) points; 2) head-to-head points; 3) head-to-head goal difference; 4) goal difference; 5) number of goals scored
(Note: Head-to-head record is used only after all the matches between the teams in question have been played)
(C) Champions; (P) Promoted; (R) Relegated

=== Results ===
Home \ Away	AST	AVI	BER	BUR	COR	FAB	GSE	LAN	LEA	MAR	NUM	OUR	OVI	RCA	SAL	SAM	SAR	VAL
Atlético Astorga	—	1–3	3–0	0–0	0–2	0–4	2–2	1–0	3–4	3–0	1–0	1–1	1–1	1–1	1–2	3–0	1–0	1–4
Ávila	2–4	—	2–1	2–1	2–1	0–4	2–1	1–2	1–0	2–1	0–0	0–2	1–1	3–3	1–2	3–2	0–0	2–2
Bergantiños	0–0	0–0	—	4–2	0–1	2–2	3–1	0–0	3–0	0–1	3–1	1–3	1–2	3–4	2–2	1–0	0–1	1–0
Burgos Promesas	1–0	1–2	1–0	—	1–0	1–4	3–0	1–1	2–2	1–0	0–1	1–1	1–2	4–4	2–1	1–1	0–2	3–3
Coruxo	1–0	1–1	0–1	5–1	—	0–2	3–1	1–2	1–0	1–2	1–1	0–1	2–2	3–1	1–0	4–1	1–0	0–2
Deportivo Fabril	3–0	2–1	0–0	3–0	2–1	—	0–1	2–0	3–1	0–0	2–1	3–0	0–1	2–1	2–1	1–0	2–1	0–1
Gimnástica Segoviana	1–1	1–0	1–1	0–0	2–0	0–0	—	1–0	2–1	3–2	0–0	2–0	1–0	3–3	0–1	3–0	1–0	1–2
Langreo	1–0	1–2	0–1	2–1	1–1	0–0	1–0	—	4–0	0–3	1–1	1–0	0–2	2–2	1–0	4–1	0–2	1–1
Lealtad	1–2	0–1	0–1	0–2	2–2	0–0	1–0	1–1	—	0–2	1–1	0–1	1–2	1–0	0–1	2–2	3–1	2–3
Marino Luanco	0–1	1–0	1–1	0–0	1–2	0–0	0–0	2–0	0–0	—	1–2	0–0	1–1	1–1	1–2	4–1	1–1	1–0
Numancia	0–1	2–1	2–1	2–0	1–2	3–0	1–0	3–1	0–1	1–0	—	2–1	1–2	2–1	3–1	0–0	2–2	3–1
UD Ourense	1–1	1–1	1–0	1–1	1–1	2–1	1–0	1–0	3–1	0–1	0–3	—	3–0	3–3	1–0	3–1	1–0	0–1
Oviedo Vetusta	1–0	0–2	1–2	5–2	0–1	1–1	3–0	3–2	1–2	1–1	0–0	0–1	—	0–0	5–2	3–0	3–2	2–1
Rayo Cantabria	3–2	4–1	1–2	0–0	1–1	2–3	1–2	1–2	1–0	1–0	0–0	1–1	1–0	—	1–1	7–0	2–0	4–1
Salamanca	2–0	1–3	0–0	3–1	2–0	0–1	1–2	1–1	2–1	0–0	1–1	1–0	0–0	1–2	—	5–1	2–1	3–0
Sámano	1–3	0–4	0–5	1–2	2–1	0–5	0–1	1–2	0–2	1–0	0–3	1–1	0–2	1–1	0–2	—	1–2	2–1
Sarriana	0–0	2–0	1–0	1–1	1–2	1–1	1–2	1–1	2–0	0–1	4–2	3–1	0–1	3–4	1–0	4–0	—	2–3
Valladolid Promesas	1–3	7–2	3–4	2–0	0–3	0–4	2–2	3–0	4–1	0–2	1–1	2–3	2–2	1–1	0–0	2–2	3–0	—

Legend: Blue = home team win; Yellow = draw; Red = away team win.

== Group 2 ==
Location of teams in 2025–26 Segunda Federación – Group 2
Location of teams in 2024–25 Segunda Federación – Group 2 (Basque Country)

Team	Home city	Autonomous Community	Stadium	Capacity
Alavés B	Vitoria	Basque Country	José Luis Compañón	2,500
Alfaro	Alfaro	La Rioja	La Molineta	4,000
Amorebieta	Amorebieta-Etxano	Basque Country	Urritxe	3,000
Basconia	Basauri	Basque Country	Artunduaga	5,000
Beasain	Beasain	Basque Country	Loinaz	6,000
Deportivo Aragón	Zaragoza	Aragon	Ciudad Deportiva	2,500
Ebro	Zaragoza	Aragon	El Carmen	400
Eibar B	Eibar	Basque Country	Unbe	4,000
Ejea	Ejea de los Caballeros	Aragon	Luchán	2,249
Gernika	Gernika-Lumo	Basque Country	Urbieta	3,000
SD Logroñés	Logroño	La Rioja	Las Gaunas	16,000
UD Logroñés	Logroño	La Rioja	Las Gaunas	16,000
Mutilvera	Aranguren	Navarre	Valle Aranguren	2,000
Náxara	Nájera	La Rioja	La Salera	1,000
Real Unión	Irun	Basque Country	Stadium Gal	5,000
Sestao River	Sestao	Basque Country	Las Llanas	8,905
Tudelano	Tudela	Navarre	Ciudad de Tudela	11,000
Utebo	Utebo	Aragon	Santa Ana	5,000

=== League table ===
Pos	Team	Pld	W	D	L	GF	GA	GD	Pts	Qualification
1	Real Unión (C, P)	34	20	9	5	64	35	+29	69	Promotion to Primera Federación and qualification to Copa del Rey
2	Alavés B	34	17	11	6	41	20	+21	62	Qualification for the promotion play-offs
3	UD Logroñés (P)	34	18	7	9	73	33	+40	61	Qualification for the promotion promotion play-offs and Copa del Rey
4	Utebo	34	17	7	10	56	42	+14	58	Qualification for the promotion promotion play-offs and Copa del Rey
5	Tudelano	34	16	9	9	56	40	+16	57	Qualification for the promotion promotion play-offs and Copa del Rey
6	Amorebieta	34	13	11	10	38	32	+6	50 (Note: Amorebieta finished ahead of Sestao River on head-to-head points: Sestao River 1–2 Amorebieta, Amorebieta 1–1 Sestao River)	Qualification for the Copa del Rey
7	Sestao River	34	12	14	8	40	33	+7	50	
8	Ebro	34	11	16	7	42	36	+6	49 (Note: Ebro finished ahead of Eibar B on head-to-head points: Ebro 1–1 Eibar B, Eibar B 1–2 Ebro)	
9	Eibar B	34	14	7	13	41	42	−1	49	
10	Basconia	34	11	14	9	55	43	+12	47	
11	Gernika	34	12	9	13	34	40	−6	45	
12	Náxara	34	11	8	15	39	48	−9	41	
13	SD Logroñés (O)	34	8	13	13	22	40	−18	37	Qualification for the relegation play-offs
14	Beasain (R)	34	8	12	14	38	46	−8	36	Relegation to Tercera Federación
15	Ejea (R)	34	8	11	15	35	55	−20	35	Relegation to Tercera Federación
16	Mutilvera (R)	34	8	6	20	31	65	−34	30	Relegation to Tercera Federación
17	Deportivo Aragón (R)	34	7	7	20	32	59	−27	28	Relegation to Tercera Federación
18	Alfaro (R)	34	6	7	21	32	60	−28	25	Relegation to Tercera Federación

Rules for classification: 1) points; 2) head-to-head points; 3) head-to-head goal difference; 4) goal difference; 5) number of goals scored
(Note: Head-to-head record is used only after all the matches between the teams in question have been played)
(C) Champions; (O) Play-off winners; (P) Promoted; (R) Relegated

==== Results ====
Home \ Away	ALA	ALF	AMO	BAS	BEA	ARA	EBR	EIB	EJE	GER	SDL	UDL	MUT	NAX	RUN	SES	TUD	UTE
Alavés B	—	2–0	1–2	0–0	2–0	2–1	1–1	2–0	3–0	0–1	0–1	2–0	2–0	1–2	1–1	1–1	3–1	2–1
Alfaro	0–3	—	0–0	1–1	1–3	3–1	0–4	0–0	0–1	0–2	0–1	0–2	2–0	2–1	1–2	2–2	2–0	1–0
Amorebieta	0–0	3–0	—	2–1	2–1	0–0	1–2	2–0	2–0	1–2	1–0	2–1	0–1	1–1	0–1	1–1	0–0	0–1
Basconia	0–2	6–4	2–1	—	1–1	1–2	1–1	1–1	5–1	0–0	0–0	3–3	4–0	2–0	0–1	3–1	1–1	4–0
Beasain	0–0	1–1	0–1	2–0	—	3–2	1–1	1–2	2–3	4–0	2–0	1–1	3–2	0–1	1–1	1–1	1–5	0–1
Deportivo Aragón	1–2	3–2	0–1	1–1	1–2	—	0–0	0–1	1–0	2–0	0–1	1–3	3–2	0–1	3–1	0–1	3–1	0–3
Ebro	1–1	2–1	0–0	1–0	1–0	1–1	—	1–1	3–1	1–1	1–1	0–3	1–1	4–1	0–0	1–1	2–2	3–1
Eibar B	0–1	4–3	0–2	1–3	0–1	1–0	1–2	—	2–1	3–2	0–0	3–2	1–2	3–2	0–1	2–1	1–0	3–2
Ejea	2–0	2–2	2–1	3–1	1–1	1–1	0–1	1–1	—	1–0	0–0	0–0	2–2	1–1	3–2	0–2	1–3	0–2
Gernika	0–0	1–0	1–0	1–0	0–0	1–0	2–0	1–2	1–0	—	2–0	1–3	1–0	2–3	2–3	0–0	1–1	0–1
SD Logroñés	0–0	1–0	1–1	0–3	1–1	1–0	2–1	2–0	0–0	1–1	—	0–4	1–3	2–0	0–0	0–0	0–1	1–2
UD Logroñés	1–1	0–1	4–1	2–2	2–1	6–0	1–0	0–1	4–1	4–0	5–0	—	3–0	2–1	4–0	2–0	1–2	3–1
Mutilvera	1–0	0–0	0–2	1–1	1–0	4–1	1–1	0–4	1–3	2–0	1–1	0–4	—	1–3	1–3	0–2	1–3	1–2
Náxara	0–1	2–1	2–2	3–0	1–0	3–0	1–1	1–1	1–1	1–4	2–0	2–1	0–1	—	1–3	1–1	0–2	0–2
Real Unión	0–0	2–0	3–3	1–2	4–0	5–1	4–0	2–1	3–0	1–1	2–1	1–1	3–1	3–0	—	0–2	0–0	4–1
Sestao River	1–2	1–0	1–2	2–2	1–1	2–0	1–0	1–0	2–0	2–2	1–1	1–0	4–0	0–0	1–2	—	1–2	1–0
Tudelano	1–2	3–1	0–0	1–2	3–1	2–2	2–4	1–0	3–1	1–0	3–0	1–1	1–0	2–1	1–2	5–1	—	1–1
Utebo	0–1	4–1	3–1	2–2	2–2	1–1	1–0	1–1	2–2	3–1	3–2	3–0	4–0	1–0	2–3	0–0	3–1	—

Legend: Blue = home team win; Yellow = draw; Red = away team win.

== Group 3 ==
Location of teams in 2025–26 Segunda Federación – Group 3
Location of teams of the 2025–26 Segunda Federación Group 3 (Province of Barcelona)

Team	Home city	Autonomous Community	Stadium	Capacity
Alcoyano	Alcoy	Valencian Community	El Collao	4,850
Andratx	Andratx	Balearic Islands	Sa Plana	600
Atlètic Lleida	Lleida	Catalonia	Ramon Farrús	1,000
Atlético Baleares	Palma	Balearic Islands	Estadi Balear	6,000
Barbastro	Barbastro	Aragon	Municipal de Deportes	5,000
Barcelona Atlètic	Barcelona	Catalonia	Johan Cruyff	6,000
Castellón B	Castellón	Valencian Community	Gaetà Huguet	5,000
Espanyol B	Barcelona	Catalonia	Dani Jarque	1,520
Girona B	Girona	Catalonia	Torres de Palau	1,000
Ibiza Islas Pitiusas	Ibiza	Balearic Islands	Can Misses	4,500
Olot	Olot	Catalonia	Municipal d'Olot	3,000
Poblense	Sa Pobla	Balearic Islands	Nou Camp	8,000
Porreres	Porreres	Balearic Islands	Ses Forques	250
Reus FCR	Reus	Catalonia	Municipal de Reus	4,300
Sant Andreu	Barcelona	Catalonia	Narcís Sala	6,653
Terrassa	Terrassa	Catalonia	Olímpic	11,500
Torrent	Torrent	Valencian Community	San Gregorio	3,000
Valencia Mestalla	Paterna	Valencian Community	Antonio Puchades	2,300

=== League table ===
Pos	Team	Pld	W	D	L	GF	GA	GD	Pts	Qualification
1	Sant Andreu (C, P)	34	20	6	8	51	33	+18	66 (Note: Sant Andreu finished ahead of Atlético Baleares on head-to-head points: Atlético Baleares 2–4 Sant Andreu, Sant Andreu 2–0 Atlético Baleares)	Promotion to Primera Federación and qualification to Copa del Rey
2	Atlético Baleares	34	19	9	6	53	34	+19	66	Qualification for the promotion play-offs and Copa del Rey
3	Poblense	34	16	11	7	41	28	+13	59	Qualification for the promotion play-offs and Copa del Rey
4	Reus FCR	34	16	7	11	50	38	+12	55 (Note: Reus FCR finished ahead of Alcoyano on head-to-head points: Alcoyano 0–1 Reus FCR, Reus FCR 2–1 Alcoyano)	Qualification for the promotion play-offs and Copa del Rey
5	Alcoyano	34	13	16	5	30	20	+10	55	Qualification for the promotion play-offs and Copa del Rey
6	Barcelona Atlètic	34	14	10	10	62	40	+22	52	
7	Girona B	34	12	11	11	45	37	+8	47	
8	Terrassa	34	11	13	10	36	44	−8	46	
9	Valencia Mestalla	34	10	14	10	53	50	+3	44 (Note: Valencia Mestalla finished ahead of Espanyol B on head-to-head points: Espanyol B 1–1 Valencia Mestalla, Valencia Mestalla 3–0 Espanyol B)	
10	Espanyol B	34	10	14	10	34	35	−1	44	
11	Barbastro	34	10	13	11	32	31	+1	43	
12	Olot	34	10	12	12	31	32	−1	42 (Note: Olot finished ahead of Castellón B on head-to-head points: Olot 2–0 Castellón B, Castellón B 1–1 Olot)	
13	Castellón B (Note: Castellón B bought the place of Tarazona after the club suffered administrative relegation.) (O)	34	11	9	14	59	72	−13	42	Qualification for the relegation play-offs
14	Ibiza Islas Pitiusas (R)	34	10	10	14	35	44	−9	40	Relegation to Tercera Federación
15	Andratx (R)	34	8	9	17	35	56	−21	33	Relegation to Tercera Federación
16	Atlètic Lleida (R)	34	6	12	16	37	51	−14	30 (Note: Atlètic Lleida finished ahead of Torrent on head-to-head points: Atlètic Lleida 2–2 Torrent, Torrent 0–1 Atlètic Lleida)	Relegation to Tercera Federación
17	Torrent (R)	34	7	9	18	36	53	−17	30	Relegation to Tercera Federación
18	Porreres (R)	34	6	9	19	22	44	−22	27	Relegation to Tercera Federación

Rules for classification: 1) points; 2) head-to-head points; 3) head-to-head goal difference; 4) goal difference; 5) number of goals scored
(Note: Head-to-head record is used only after all the matches between the teams in question have been played)
(C) Champions; (O) Play-off winners; (P) Promoted; (R) Relegated

=== Results ===
Home \ Away	ALC	AND	ATL	ATB	BRB	BAT	CAS	ESP	GIR	IIP	OLO	POB	POR	RED	SAN	TER	TOR	VAL
Alcoyano	—	1–0	2–1	0–0	1–0	3–2	0–0	1–1	2–0	1–0	0–2	0–0	2–0	0–1	2–0	0–0	4–1	2–2
Andratx	0–0	—	3–0	1–0	1–1	2–1	1–1	0–0	0–3	2–0	2–0	1–3	1–2	1–2	1–0	0–2	1–0	5–3
Atlètic Lleida	1–2	3–2	—	0–1	3–3	3–2	2–4	1–1	1–1	2–0	0–1	1–2	2–0	1–2	1–1	2–2	2–2	1–1
Atlético Baleares	1–1	5–1	1–0	—	1–0	4–4	3–0	1–1	2–2	1–0	1–0	2–1	1–0	2–1	2–4	3–1	5–1	1–0
Barbastro	0–0	3–0	1–1	0–2	—	0–2	3–1	0–0	1–1	1–2	1–1	0–2	2–0	0–0	1–2	0–1	2–1	2–1
Barcelona Atlètic	1–1	4–0	2–1	1–1	0–0	—	4–0	3–1	0–1	4–0	2–0	2–2	2–0	4–2	0–1	1–1	4–1	2–2
Castellón B	4–1	1–1	2–2	2–1	1–3	2–2	—	1–1	4–2	2–1	1–1	2–0	1–3	3–1	1–2	3–3	0–2	0–4
Espanyol B	1–2	2–1	1–0	0–1	1–1	1–0	2–4	—	2–1	2–2	1–0	0–0	0–0	2–0	1–2	1–1	1–2	1–1
Girona B	0–1	1–0	3–1	1–1	0–0	0–0	7–3	0–1	—	2–2	4–1	1–0	1–0	1–1	2–1	4–2	1–0	1–1
Ibiza Islas Pitiusas	1–0	2–2	1–1	1–3	1–2	1–0	3–1	0–1	1–0	—	2–1	3–1	1–1	1–0	1–3	1–0	1–0	1–2
Olot	0–0	3–0	2–1	1–1	1–0	1–1	2–0	0–0	2–1	1–0	—	1–0	0–0	0–0	2–2	1–1	1–2	2–0
Poblense	0–0	0–0	3–0	0–0	1–0	1–0	3–2	1–0	1–0	0–0	0–0	—	3–1	1–2	1–0	1–1	2–1	1–0
Porreres	0–0	2–0	1–1	0–1	0–1	1–5	2–3	0–1	1–2	1–1	2–1	0–3	—	0–0	1–0	0–1	1–0	1–1
Reus FCR	0–1	2–1	0–1	4–0	0–0	4–1	2–3	3–2	1–0	2–1	1–0	1–2	2–0	—	1–2	3–0	4–2	1–1
Sant Andreu	0–0	3–0	1–0	2–0	0–1	0–1	3–0	2–1	2–1	2–1	1–1	2–0	1–0	2–1	—	1–1	3–2	3–2
Terrassa	0–0	2–1	0–0	3–1	1–0	0–2	1–4	1–4	0–0	1–1	1–0	2–3	2–1	0–1	0–0	—	1–0	2–0
Torrent	0–0	2–2	0–1	1–2	1–2	3–1	1–0	0–0	1–1	1–1	1–0	1–1	1–0	2–2	1–2	0–1	—	2–2
Valencia Mestalla	1–0	2–2	1–0	0–2	1–1	0–2	3–3	3–0	1–0	1–1	3–2	2–2	1–1	1–3	3–1	5–1	2–1	—

Legend: Blue = home team win; Yellow = draw; Red = away team win.

== Group 4 ==
Location of teams in 2025–26 Segunda Federación – Group 4

Team	Home city	Autonomous Community	Stadium	Capacity
Águilas	Águilas	Murcia	El Rubial	4,000
Almería B	Almería	Andalusia	Anexo al Power Horse Stadium	500
Atlético Antoniano	Lebrija	Andalusia	Municipal de Lebrija	3,500
Atlético Malagueño	Málaga	Andalusia	Ciudad Deportiva	1,000
Estepona	Estepona	Andalusia	Francisco Muñoz Pérez	3,800
Extremadura	Almendralejo	Extremadura	Francisco de la Hera	11,580
Jaén	Jaén	Andalusia	La Victoria	12,569
Linares	Linares	Andalusia	Linarejos	10,000
Lorca Deportiva	Lorca	Murcia	Francisco Artés Carrasco	8,120
FC La Unión Atlético/CD Unión Malacitano	Málaga	Andalusia	Municipal Juan Cayuela (Totana)	2,500
Melilla	Melilla	Melilla	Álvarez Claro	10,000
Minera	Llano del Beal	Murcia	Ángel Cedrán	2,000
Puente Genil	Puente Genil	Andalusia	Manuel Polinario	2,000
Recreativo	Huelva	Andalusia	Nuevo Colombino	21,670
UCAM Murcia	Murcia	Murcia	La Condomina	6,000
Xerez	Jerez de la Frontera	Andalusia	Chapín	20,523
Xerez Deportivo	Jerez de la Frontera	Andalusia	Chapín	20,523
Yeclano	Yecla	Murcia	La Constitución	4,000

=== League table ===
Pos	Team	Pld	W	D	L	GF	GA	GD	Pts	Qualification
1	Extremadura (C, P)	34	17	12	5	54	38	+16	63 (Note: Extremadura finished ahead of Minera on head-to-head points: Minera 2–2 Extremadura, Extremadura 1–0 Minera)	Promotion to Primera Federación and qualification to Copa del Rey
2	Minera	34	19	6	9	50	33	+17	63	Qualification for the promotion play-offs and Copa del Rey
3	Águilas (P)	34	18	7	9	45	25	+20	61	Qualification for the promotion play-offs and Copa del Rey
4	Xerez	34	17	8	9	32	24	+8	59	Qualification for the promotion play-offs and Copa del Rey
5	Jaén (P)	34	16	10	8	43	33	+10	58	Qualification for the promotion play-offs and Copa del Rey
6	Recreativo	34	16	9	9	41	25	+16	57	
7	UCAM Murcia	34	16	7	11	49	41	+8	55	
8	Linares	34	11	14	9	42	45	−3	47	
9	La Unión Atlético (D)	34	13	6	15	44	43	+1	45 (Note: La Unión Atlético finished ahead of Lorca Deportiva on overall goal difference)	Dissolved after the season
10	Lorca Deportiva	34	12	9	13	32	36	−4	45	
11	Yeclano	34	12	8	14	33	33	0	44 (Note: Head-to-head points: Yeclano 8 pts, Atlético Antoniano 4 pts, Estepona 4 pts. Atlético Antoniano finished ahead of Estepona on overall goal difference)	
12	Atlético Antoniano	34	12	8	14	38	40	−2	44	
13	Estepona (O)	34	12	8	14	40	44	−4	44	Qualification for the relegation play-offs
14	Puente Genil (Note: Puente Genil retained after La Unión Atlético was not allowed to register for the 2026–27 season.)	34	10	10	14	28	37	−9	40	
15	Xerez Deportivo (R)	34	8	12	14	34	43	−9	36	Relegation to Tercera Federación
16	Melilla (R)	34	7	13	14	36	40	−4	34	Relegation to Tercera Federación
17	Almería B (R)	34	4	9	21	26	53	−27	21 (Note: Almería B finished ahead of Atlético Malagueño on head-to-head points: Atlético Malagueño 0–1 Almería B, Almería B 1–1 Atlético Malagueño)	Relegation to Tercera Federación
18	Atlético Malagueño (R)	34	5	6	23	32	66	−34	21	Relegation to Tercera Federación

Rules for classification: 1) points; 2) head-to-head points; 3) head-to-head goal difference; 4) goal difference; 5) number of goals scored
(Note: Head-to-head record is used only after all the matches between the teams in question have been played)
(C) Champions; (D) Disqualified; (O) Play-off winners; (P) Promoted; (R) Relegated

=== Results ===
Home \ Away	AGU	ALM	ANT	MAL	EST	EXT	JAE	LUA	LIN	LOR	MEL	MIN	PNG	REC	UCM	XER	XDE	YEC
Águilas	—	2–0	1–0	3–1	2–1	1–2	1–1	2–0	2–0	2–0	3–1	0–1	3–1	0–0	1–2	0–0	3–0	2–1
Almería B	0–1	—	0–0	1–1	1–2	2–2	1–1	0–3	0–1	1–1	1–1	3–4	2–1	0–2	1–2	1–2	0–1	1–0
Atlético Antoniano	1–0	2–0	—	2–1	1–2	1–0	2–3	0–0	1–2	3–1	3–2	1–0	4–0	2–0	2–1	3–2	0–0	1–1
Atlético Malagueño	1–3	0–1	3–2	—	0–3	2–1	2–1	1–3	1–2	1–1	3–3	0–2	0–0	0–2	1–0	1–2	2–1	0–1
Estepona	2–1	1–1	1–2	3–1	—	1–1	1–2	3–2	1–1	1–3	1–1	0–0	1–2	0–1	2–0	0–0	0–2	0–2
Extremadura	1–0	2–4	3–0	3–2	3–2	—	1–1	4–2	1–1	3–0	1–0	1–0	3–1	2–1	2–2	1–0	3–2	2–1
Jaén	3–1	2–1	1–1	3–0	0–0	0–1	—	1–0	0–1	4–2	1–1	2–0	2–1	2–1	0–3	2–0	2–1	1–0
La Unión Atlético	1–3	1–0	2–2	3–1	0–3	2–1	2–0	—	3–1	1–2	1–0	1–2	1–0	0–1	4–1	0–1	1–1	0–0
Linares	1–1	3–1	2–0	1–1	2–3	1–2	1–1	0–2	—	1–3	0–0	3–2	1–0	1–1	2–1	2–2	1–2	2–1
Lorca Deportiva	0–1	1–0	1–0	2–1	0–2	0–0	0–0	1–2	1–1	—	1–0	2–1	1–0	0–0	2–0	0–1	1–0	2–2
Melilla	0–1	3–0	1–1	2–1	3–0	0–0	0–1	2–2	2–4	2–1	—	2–2	1–0	0–0	2–0	1–1	1–1	1–0
Minera	0–2	4–0	1–0	3–2	1–0	2–2	1–1	1–0	5–0	1–0	2–1	—	2–1	1–1	2–0	1–0	2–1	1–0
Puente Genil	1–0	1–0	2–1	2–1	1–0	1–1	1–1	0–0	1–1	1–0	0–0	1–1	—	0–0	1–1	2–1	1–1	0–1
Recreativo	0–0	1–0	2–0	1–0	5–0	3–1	1–0	1–0	1–1	2–1	1–0	1–0	1–2	—	1–2	1–2	3–2	5–1
UCAM Murcia	1–0	2–1	0–0	4–0	2–0	1–1	1–2	1–2	1–1	2–1	3–2	3–1	3–2	2–0	—	2–0	2–1	1–1
Xerez	1–1	1–0	2–0	1–0	0–1	0–0	1–0	2–1	1–1	0–1	1–0	1–0	0–1	1–0	1–0	—	1–0	1–0
Xerez Deportivo	1–1	1–1	2–0	1–1	0–2	0–0	1–2	4–2	0–0	0–0	2–1	1–3	1–0	1–1	1–2	0–0	—	2–1
Yeclano	0–1	1–1	1–0	3–0	1–1	2–3	2–0	1–0	1–0	0–0	1–0	0–1	1–0	1–0	1–1	1–3	3–0	—

Legend: Blue = home team win; Yellow = draw; Red = away team win.

== Group 5 ==
Location of teams in 2025–26 Segunda Federación – Group 5
Location of teams of the 2025–26 Segunda Federación – Group 5 (Canary Islands)
Location of teams in 2025–26 Segunda Federación – Group 5 (Community of Madrid)

Team	Home city	Autonomous Community	Stadium	Capacity
Alcalá	Alcalá de Henares	Madrid	Municipal del Val	7,000
Conquense	Cuenca	Castilla–La Mancha	La Fuensanta	6,000
Coria	Coria	Extremadura	La Isla	3,000
Elche Ilicitano	Elche	Valencian Community	José Díaz Iborra	1,500
Fuenlabrada	Fuenlabrada	Madrid	Fernando Torres	5,400
Getafe B	Getafe	Madrid	Ciudad Deportiva	1,500
Intercity	Alicante	Valencian Community	Antonio Solana	3,000
Las Palmas Atlético	Las Palmas	Canary Islands	Anexo Gran Canaria	2,000
Moscardó	Madrid	Madrid	Román Valero	5,000
Navalcarnero	Navalcarnero	Madrid	Mariano González	2,500
Orihuela	Orihuela	Valencian Community	Los Arcos	7,000
Quintanar del Rey	Quintanar del Rey	Castilla–La Mancha	San Marcos	2,000
Rayo Majadahonda	Majadahonda	Madrid	Cerro del Espino	3,800
Rayo Vallecano B	Madrid	Madrid	Ciudad Deportiva	1,000
Real Madrid C	Madrid	Madrid	Ciudad Real Madrid	3,000
San Sebastián de los Reyes	San Sebastián de los Reyes	Madrid	Matapiñonera	3,000
Socuéllamos	Socuéllamos	Castilla–La Mancha	Paquito Giménez	2,500
Tenerife B	Santa Cruz de Tenerife	Canary Islands	Centro Insular	1,000

=== League table ===
Pos	Team	Pld	W	D	L	GF	GA	GD	Pts	Qualification
1	Rayo Majadahonda (C, P)	34	20	10	4	52	23	+29	70 (Note: Rayo Majadahonda finished ahead of San Sebastián de los Reyes on head-to-head points: Rayo Majadahonda 2–1 San Sebastián de los Reyes, San Sebastián de los Reyes 1–1 Rayo Majadahonda)	Promotion to Primera Federación and qualification to Copa del Rey
2	San Sebastián de los Reyes	34	21	7	6	51	27	+24	70	Qualification for the promotion play-offs and Copa del Rey
3	Conquense	34	16	12	6	42	30	+12	60	Qualification for the promotion play-offs and Copa del Rey
4	Getafe B	34	16	9	9	55	35	+20	57 (Note: Getafe B finished ahead of Coria on overall goal difference)	Qualification for the promotion play-offs
5	Coria (P)	34	16	9	9	50	38	+12	57	Qualification for the promotion play-offs and Copa del Rey
6	Alcalá (Q)	34	14	9	11	42	39	+3	51	Qualification for the Copa del Rey
7	Tenerife B	34	15	5	14	57	53	+4	50	
8	Orihuela	34	12	10	12	45	43	+2	46	
9	Intercity	34	11	10	13	42	45	−3	43 (Note: Intercity finished ahead of Navalcarnero on head-to-head goal difference: Intercity−Navalcarnero 3−0, Navalcarnero−Intercity 3−1)	
10	Navalcarnero	34	11	10	13	40	42	−2	43	
11	Las Palmas Atlético	34	11	9	14	42	45	−3	42	
12	Elche Ilicitano	34	10	11	13	51	56	−5	41	
13	Real Madrid C (Note: Real Madrid C bought the place of Arenteiro after the club suffered administrative relegation.) (O)	34	11	7	16	42	45	−3	40	Qualification for the relegation play-offs
14	Quintanar del Rey (R)	34	11	6	17	36	43	−7	39	Relegation to Tercera Federación
15	Fuenlabrada (R)	34	9	10	15	35	44	−9	37	Relegation to Tercera Federación
16	Moscardó (R)	34	9	7	18	37	57	−20	34	Relegation to Tercera Federación
17	Socuéllamos (R)	34	7	10	17	34	55	−21	31	Relegation to Tercera Federación
18	Rayo Vallecano B (R)	34	9	3	22	30	63	−33	30	Relegation to Tercera Federación

Rules for classification: 1) points; 2) head-to-head points; 3) head-to-head goal difference; 4) goal difference; 5) number of goals scored
(Note: Head-to-head record is used only after all the matches between the teams in question have been played)
(C) Champions; (O) Play-off winners; (P) Promoted; (Q) Qualified for the phase indicated; (R) Relegated

=== Results ===
Home \ Away	ALC	CON	COR	ELC	FUE	GET	INT	LPA	MOS	NAV	ORI	QUI	RMJ	RVA	RMC	SSR	SOC	TEN
Alcalá	—	2–1	1–2	2–0	0–0	1–1	2–0	2–1	3–0	1–0	0–1	1–0	0–2	3–0	1–0	1–1	3–1	1–0
Conquense	2–1	—	2–0	0–2	2–0	0–0	2–2	3–0	3–0	1–1	0–0	2–1	0–1	2–1	1–0	1–0	2–1	1–0
Coria	1–1	1–2	—	4–0	2–0	3–0	1–0	1–0	5–0	2–1	0–0	0–0	0–1	3–2	2–1	1–1	2–2	2–1
Elche Ilicitano	3–3	5–2	1–1	—	2–3	2–2	3–2	0–1	1–1	0–0	2–5	1–3	0–1	2–1	2–0	1–2	1–1	0–2
Fuenlabrada	0–2	0–1	1–2	1–1	—	0–0	1–1	1–1	3–0	1–0	0–0	2–1	0–0	5–0	1–1	0–1	1–1	1–1
Getafe B	3–0	1–1	4–1	2–2	2–1	—	0–1	3–0	0–2	3–2	2–3	3–0	2–0	3–0	2–1	4–0	1–0	2–1
Intercity	2–1	0–2	0–2	1–1	2–1	1–0	—	3–2	2–0	3–0	2–1	1–2	1–1	2–0	1–2	0–2	1–1	2–3
Las Palmas Atlético	2–0	1–1	1–1	1–2	1–2	3–2	0–0	—	3–0	3–2	2–1	1–2	1–0	2–0	0–1	1–2	3–0	0–1
Moscardó	1–1	2–2	2–1	3–2	3–0	1–2	1–3	1–2	—	0–0	1–0	1–5	0–0	4–0	1–2	0–1	3–1	0–2
Navalcarnero	3–1	2–0	1–1	2–1	3–1	0–0	3–1	0–0	2–1	—	0–0	1–0	2–3	2–1	2–0	0–2	1–0	4–1
Orihuela	0–1	2–2	0–4	1–1	2–0	2–1	0–4	3–2	1–1	4–0	—	3–1	2–3	2–0	1–2	0–2	1–1	1–2
Quintanar del Rey	0–0	0–0	0–1	0–0	1–0	3–1	0–0	0–2	3–2	1–0	2–0	—	0–1	0–0	1–2	0–2	3–0	2–3
Rayo Majadahonda	1–2	2–0	0–0	4–2	1–0	0–1	4–1	2–2	1–1	0–0	0–0	2–0	—	3–0	1–0	2–1	1–1	2–1
Rayo Vallecano B	3–1	0–0	2–1	0–2	1–2	0–4	3–1	3–0	0–1	2–1	0–0	4–1	0–4	—	3–2	0–1	0–2	1–4
Real Madrid C	2–2	0–1	2–3	0–1	3–1	1–1	1–1	2–0	1–0	1–1	1–3	0–1	0–3	1–0	—	1–2	1–1	4–0
San Sebastián de los Reyes	1–0	1–1	3–0	2–0	3–0	0–0	0–0	1–1	2–1	3–1	2–1	3–2	1–1	0–1	0–3	—	3–0	1–2
Socuéllamos	2–2	0–1	2–0	2–5	2–3	2–1	1–1		0–2	1–0	1–2	3–1	1–2	0–1	2–1	0–2	—	0–3
Tenerife B	3–0	1–1	4–0	1–3	1–3	1–2	2–0	2–2	3–1	3–3	1–3	1–0	1–3	2–1	3–3	1–3	0–1	—

Legend: Blue = home team win; Yellow = draw; Red = away team win.

== Ranking of 13th-place teams ==
Pos	Grp	Team	Pld	W	D	L	GF	GA	GD	Pts	Qualification or relegation
1	1	Valladolid Promesas	34	12	9	13	59	58	+1	45	
2	4	Estepona (O)	34	12	8	14	40	44	−4	44	Qualification for the relegation play-offs
3	3	Castellón B (O)	34	11	9	14	59	72	−13	42	Qualification for the relegation play-offs
4	5	Real Madrid C (O)	34	11	7	16	42	45	−3	40	Qualification for the relegation play-offs
5	2	SD Logroñés (O)	34	8	13	13	22	40	−18	37	Qualification for the relegation play-offs

Updated to match(es) played on 3 May 2026. Source:
Rules for classification: 1) points; 2) goal difference; 3) number of goals scored
(O) Play-off winners

== See also ==
- 2025–26 La Liga
- 2025–26 Segunda División
- 2025–26 Primera Federación
- 2025–26 Tercera Federación
