= Javi Motos =

Spanish football manager (born 1988)

Personal information
- Full name: Javier Motos Sánchez
- Date of birth: 5 September 1988 (age 38)
- Place of birth: Murcia, Spain

Team information
- Current team: Melilla (manager)

Youth career
- Years: Team
- ElPozo Murcia (futsal)
- Montecasillas
- Atlético Cabezo de Torres

Managerial career
- 2009–2011: Puente Tocinos (youth)
- 2011: Puente Tocinos
- 2011–2012: Olímpico Totana (assistant)
- 2012–2013: Alberca (youth)
- 2013–2017: Ranero (youth)
- 2015–2016: Plus Ultra (assistant)
- 2017–2018: Murcia (youth)
- 2018–2020: Murcia B
- 2019: Murcia (caretaker)
- 2020–2022: Mar Menor
- 2023–2024: Racing Cartagena MM
- 2024–2025: UCAM Murcia
- 2025–: Melilla

Javier "Javi" Motos Sánchez (born 5 September 1988) is a Spanish football manager, who is currently in charge of UD Melilla.

== Career ==
Born in Puente Tocinos, Murcia, Motos played for the futsal side ElPozo Murcia FS, and the football sides of Montecasillas FC and CA Cabezo de Torres as a youth before retiring at the age of 17. He began his managerial career with the Juvenil squad of local side FC Puente Tocinos, taking over the main squad in the last ten rounds of the 2010–11 Tercera División in the place of Víctor Basadre.

After working as an assistant of Club Olímpico de Totana, Motos was subsequently in charge of the Juvenil sides of CD Alberca and Ranero CF; during the 2015–16 season, he was also an assistant of Juan Antonio Calvo at CD Plus Ultra. On 25 April 2017, he agreed to join Real Murcia CF as a manager of the Juvenil team.

On 7 June 2018, Motos was appointed manager of Real Murcia Imperial in the fourth division. On 28 February of the following year, he was named caretaker manager of the first team, after Manolo Herrero's dismissal, managing the side for three matches before the arrival of Julio Algar on 18 March.

Motos left Murcia on 16 June 2020, after refusing a contract renewal, and took over Mar Menor FC on 6 August. He left the club on 24 May 2022, but returned to the side on 26 January of the following year.

On 22 June 2023, Motos renewed his contract with Mar Menor, with the club now named Racing Cartagena Mar Menor FC. He left the following 8 January, amidst the financial crisis of the club.

On 4 June 2024, Motos was announced as manager of UCAM Murcia CF in Segunda Federación. On 8 April 2025, Motos was sacked by UCAM Murcia following a string of negative results.

On 28 October 2025, Motos was announced as manager of fellow Segunda Federación side UD Melilla; he replaced the sacked Alberto Cifuentes.

== Managerial statistics ==
As of 7 December 2025

Managerial record by team and tenure
Team	Nat	From	To	Record								Ref
Team	Nat	From	To	G	W	D	L	GF	GA	GD	Win %	Ref
Puente Tocinos	(Spain)	8 March 2011	30 June 2011	10	2	3	5	17	28	−11	20.00	
Murcia B	(Spain)	7 June 2018	16 June 2020	67	29	15	23	103	87	+16	43.28	
Murcia (caretaker)	(Spain)	26 February 2019	18 March 2019	3	0	1	2	1	4	−3	0.00	
Mar Menor	(Spain)	6 August 2020	24 May 2022	63	31	16	16	66	46	+20	49.21	
Racing Cartagena MM	(Spain)	25 January 2023	8 January 2024	33	12	7	14	25	33	−8	36.36	
UCAM Murcia	(Spain)	4 June 2024	8 April 2025	32	14	11	7	39	19	+20	43.75	
Melilla	(Spain)	28 October 2025	Present	6	1	3	2	5	5	+0	16.67	
Total				214	89	56	69	256	222	+34	41.59	—
