= 2022–23 Primera Federación =

Primera Federación
- Season: 2022–23
- Dates: 27 August 2022 – 25 June 2023
- Champions: Amorebieta (1st title)
- Promoted: Alcorcón; Amorebieta; Eldense; Racing Ferrol
- Relegated: Badajoz; Bilbao Athletic; Calahorra; La Nucía; Linense; UD Logroñés; Numancia; Pontevedra; San Sebastián de los Reyes; Talavera de la Reina
- Top goalscorer: Rodri (20 goals)
- Biggest home win: Deportivo La Coruña 5–0 Badajoz (25 February 2023)
- Biggest away win: Talavera de la Reina 2–7 Real Madrid Castilla (30 April 2023)
- Highest scoring: Talavera de la Reina 2–7 Real Madrid Castilla (30 April 2023)
- Highest attendance: 27,831; Murcia 1–1 Barcelona Atlètic (05 March 2023)

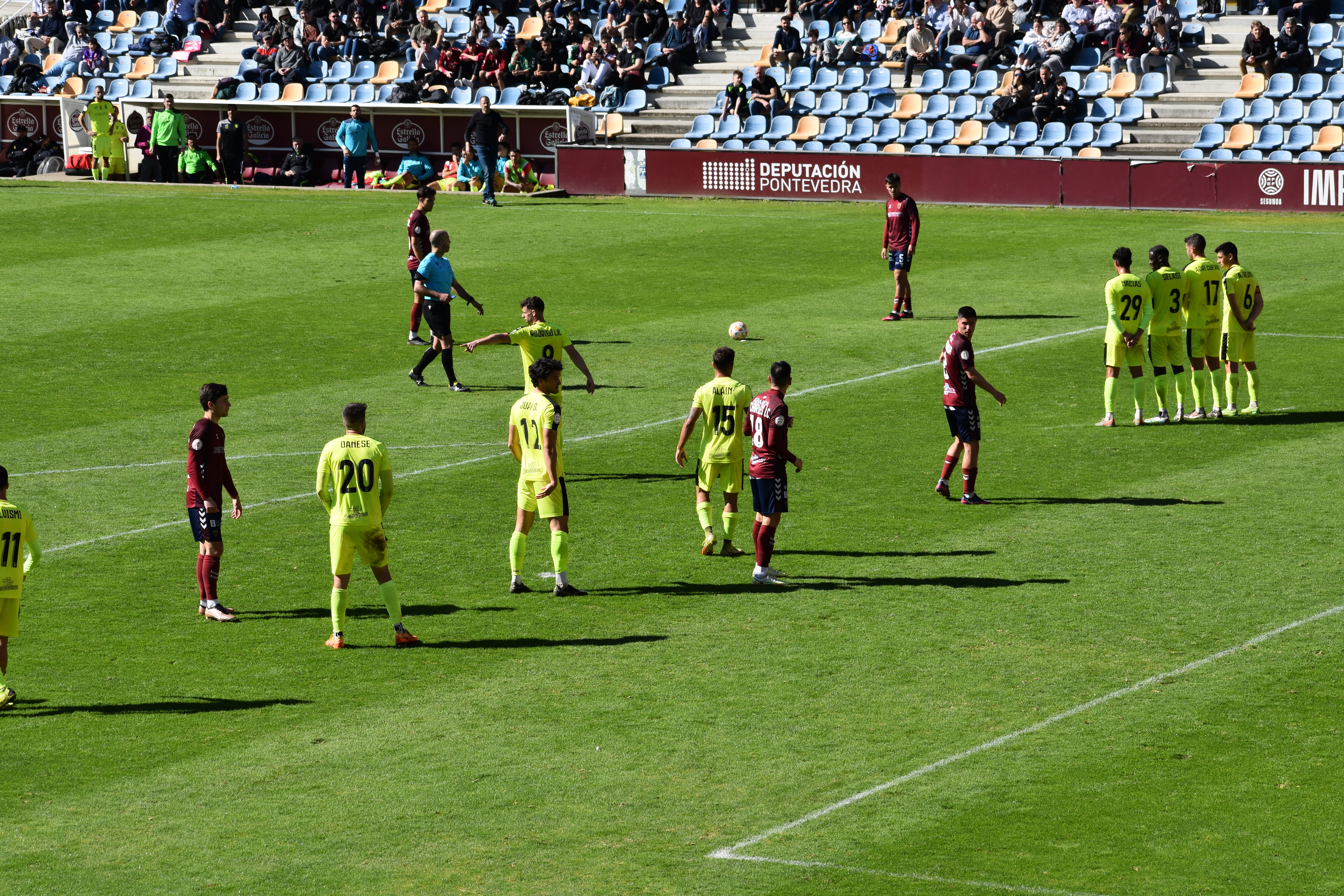
Match between Pontevedra and Ceuta on 26 February 2023, at the Pasarón

The 2022–23 Primera Federación season was the second season for the Primera Federación, the third highest level in the Spanish football league system. Forty teams participated, divided into two groups of twenty clubs each based on geographical proximity. In each group, the champions were automatically promoted to Segunda División, while the second to fifth placers played the promotion play-offs and the bottom five were relegated to the Segunda Federación.

== Overview before the season ==
A total of 40 teams joined the league, including four relegated from the 2021–22 Segunda División, 26 retained from the 2021–22 Primera División RFEF, and 10 promoted from the 2021–22 Segunda División RFEF.

=== Team changes ===
Promoted from 2021–22 Segunda División RFEF	Relegated from 2021–22 Segunda División	Promoted to 2022–23 Segunda División	Relegated to 2022–23 Segunda Federación	Dissolved Team
Ceuta; Córdoba; Eldense; Intercity; La Nucía; Mérida; Murcia; Numancia; Osasuna B Pontevedra	Alcorcón; Amorebieta; Fuenlabrada; Real Sociedad B	Racing Santander; Andorra; Albacete; Villarreal B	Atlético Sanluqueño; Betis Deportivo; Costa Brava; Sevilla Atlético; Tudelano; UCAM Murcia; Valladolid Promesas; Zamora	Extremadura (Note: Expelled due failure to pay their players); Internacional (Note: Resigned due to economic problems)

== Groups ==
=== Group 1 (West) ===
Location of teams in 2022–23 Primera Federación – Group 1
Location of teams in 2022–23 Primera Federación – Group 1 (Community of Madrid)

==== Teams and locations ====
Team	Home city	Stadium	Capacity
Alcorcón	Alcorcón	Santo Domingo	5,100
Algeciras	Algeciras	Nuevo Mirador	7,200
Badajoz	Badajoz	Nuevo Vivero	15,198
Celta Vigo B	Vigo	Barreiro	4,500
Ceuta	Ceuta	Alfonso Murube	6,500
Córdoba	Córdoba	El Arcángel	20,989
Cultural Leonesa	León	Reino de León	13,346
Deportivo La Coruña	A Coruña	Abanca-Riazor	32,660
Fuenlabrada	Fuenlabrada	Fernando Torres	5,400
Linares	Linares	Linarejos	10,000
Linense	La Línea de la Concepción	Municipal de La Línea	12,000
Mérida	Mérida	Estadio Romano	14,600
Pontevedra	Pontevedra	Pasarón	12,000
Racing Ferrol	Ferrol	A Malata	12,043
Rayo Majadahonda	Majadahonda	Cerro del Espino	3,800
Real Madrid Castilla	Madrid	Alfredo di Stéfano	6,000
San Fernando	San Fernando	Iberoamericano	12,000
San Sebastián de los Reyes	San Sebastián de los Reyes	Matapiñonera	3,000
Talavera	Talavera de la Reina	El Prado	5,000
Unionistas	Salamanca	Reina Sofía	5,000

==== Personnel and sponsorship ====
Team	Manager	Captain	Kit manufacturer	Shirt main sponsor
Alcorcón	(Spain) Fran Fernández	(Martinique) Jean-Sylvain Babin	Kappa	Eneryeti
Algeciras	(Spain) Iván Ania	(Spain) Iván Turrillo	Givova	Nuctech
Badajoz	(Spain) David Tenorio	(Spain) Zelu	Adidas	Civitas Pacensis
Celta B	(Spain) Claudio Giráldez	(Spain) Iker Losada	Adidas	Estrella Galicia
Ceuta	(Spain) José Juan Romero	(Spain) David Castro	Joma	ceuta
Córdoba	(Spain) Manuel Mosquera	(Spain) Javi Flores	Givova	Patrimonio de la Humanidad
Cultural Leonesa	(Spain) Israel Martínez	(Spain) Julen Castañeda	Kappa	Aspire Academy
Deportivo La Coruña	(Spain) Rubén de la Barrera	(Spain) Álex Bergantiños	Kappa	Estrella Galicia
Fuenlabrada	(Spain) Alfredo Sánchez	(Spain) Mikel Iribas	Joma	Grupo Avimosa
Linares	(Spain) Alberto González	(Spain) Rodri	Nike	Martín López Carburantes
Linense	(Spain) Víctor Basadre	(Spain) Víctor Mena	Legea	Lotus Festina
Mérida	(Spain) Juanma Barrero	(Spain) Javi Montoya	Erreà	Ayuntamiento de Mérida
Pontevedra	(Spain) Juan Señor	(Spain) Álex González	Hummel	Estrella Galicia
Racing Ferrol	(Spain) Cristóbal Parralo	(Spain) Joselu	Lotto	Estrella Galicia
Rayo Majadahonda	(Spain) Alfredo Santaelena	(Spain) Jorge Casado	Nike	Afar 4
Real Madrid Castilla	(Spain) Raúl González	(Spain) Carlos Dotor	Adidas	Emirates
San Fernando	(Spain) Pablo Alfaro	(Spain) Juanmi Callejón	Nike	
San Sebastián de los Reyes	(Spain) Antonio Calle	(Spain) Borja Sánchez	Nike	Tecnitasa
Talavera de la Reina	(Spain) Pedro Díaz	(Spain) Dani Ramos	Adidas	
Unionistas	(Spain) Dani Ponz	(Spain) Carlos de la Nava	Erreà	Grupo Ecotisa

==== League table ====
Pos	Team	Pld	W	D	L	GF	GA	GD	Pts	Qualification
1	Racing Ferrol (C, P)	38	22	9	7	55	25	+30	75	Promotion to Segunda División and qualification for the Copa del Rey
2	Alcorcón (O, P)	38	21	11	6	53	23	+30	74	Qualification for the promotion play-offs and Copa del Rey
3	Real Madrid Castilla	38	19	12	7	58	38	+20	69	Qualification for the promotion play-offs
4	Deportivo La Coruña	38	18	13	7	53	29	+24	67	Qualification for the promotion play-offs and Copa del Rey
5	Celta Vigo B	38	16	11	11	48	38	+10	59 (Note: Celta Vigo B finished ahead of Linares on head-to-head points: Linares–Celta Vigo B 1–2, Celta Vigo B–Linares 4–2)	Qualification for the promotion play-offs
6	Linares	38	17	8	13	53	53	0	59	Qualification for the Copa del Rey
7	Unionistas	38	15	11	12	38	40	−2	56	Qualification for the Copa del Rey
8	Mérida	38	14	12	12	40	37	+3	54 (Note: Mérida finished ahead of Córdoba on head-to-head points: Córdoba–Mérida 1–2, Mérida–Córdoba 0–0)	
9	Córdoba	38	14	12	12	48	37	+11	54	
10	Cultural Leonesa	38	13	9	16	41	43	−2	48	
11	Fuenlabrada	38	13	7	18	32	51	−19	46	
12	Ceuta	38	12	9	17	53	52	+1	45 (Note: Head-to-head points: Ceuta 7, San Fernando 5, Rayo Majadahonda 4.)	
13	San Fernando	38	11	12	15	46	50	−4	45	
14	Rayo Majadahonda	38	12	9	17	42	51	−9	45	
15	Algeciras	38	11	11	16	36	47	−11	44	
16	Badajoz (R)	38	11	10	17	35	52	−17	43 (Note: Badajoz finished ahead of San Sebastian de los Reyes on head-to-head points: San Sebastián de los Reyes–Badajoz 1–3, Badajoz–San Sebastián de los Reyes 0–0)	Relegation to Segunda Federación
17	San Sebastián de los Reyes (R)	38	11	10	17	30	46	−16	43	Relegation to Segunda Federación
18	Linense (R)	38	10	12	16	31	34	−3	42	Relegation to Segunda Federación
19	Pontevedra (R)	38	9	9	20	34	53	−19	36	Relegation to Segunda Federación
20	Talavera de la Reina (R)	38	8	9	21	36	63	−27	33	Relegation to Segunda Federación

Updated to match(es) played on 27 May 2023. Source:
Rules for classification: 1) points; 2) head-to-head points; 3) head-to-head goal difference; 4) goal difference; 5) number of goals scored
(C) Champions; (O) Play-off winners; (P) Promoted; (R) Relegated

==== Results ====
Home \ Away	ALC	ALG	BAD	CEL	CEU	COR	CUL	DEP	FUE	LNR	LNS	MER	PON	RFE	RMJ	RMC	SFE	SSR	TAL	UNI
Alcorcón	—	2–0	1–0	1–1	2–2	3–0	2–0	3–1	1–1	0–0	0–0	0–0	1–0	0–1	2–1	4–1	2–1	2–0	1–0	2–0
Algeciras	0–0	—	1–1	0–0	1–2	1–1	0–1	1–2	2–1	3–3	1–0	1–0	0–2	1–1	2–1	0–1	0–1	0–0	2–0	1–1
Badajoz	2–0	0–1	—	1–0	2–1	2–4	1–0	1–0	3–0	1–1	0–2	1–1	1–0	0–3	0–0	0–2	1–1	0–0	1–1	2–1
Celta Vigo B	1–0	2–2	2–0	—	1–1	1–2	2–1	1–1	1–0	4–2	1–0	1–2	1–0	1–0	3–1	1–2	2–2	1–2	1–1	0–1
Ceuta	1–2	1–3	3–0	1–3	—	1–2	2–1	1–2	1–0	2–0	0–0	1–0	1–2	0–2	5–1	2–2	2–2	3–1	4–1	1–2
Córdoba	1–1	3–1	3–1	0–2	1–1	—	2–0	1–1	3–0	2–1	0–1	1–2	1–0	1–2	2–0	1–2	1–1	0–1	3–0	4–1
Cultural Leonesa	0–2	0–1	0–1	1–1	2–0	0–3	—	1–0	2–0	0–2	1–1	2–0	2–0	0–0	1–3	1–0	2–0	4–1	3–1	2–0
Deportivo La Coruña	0–0	4–0	5–0	2–0	1–0	0–0	2–2	—	4–2	2–1	2–1	1–0	1–1	2–0	1–0	1–1	0–1	1–0	3–2	3–0
Fuenlabrada	0–4	2–0	2–0	1–1	2–1	2–0	0–0	0–3	—	1–2	1–0	0–1	2–1	1–0	1–0	1–2	2–1	0–0	2–1	2–1
Linares	1–0	2–0	2–1	1–2	2–2	2–1	0–2	3–2	0–2	—	1–0	2–0	1–0	1–1	1–0	0–2	1–1	2–1	3–0	4–3
Linense	1–2	0–2	1–1	1–1	2–1	1–0	1–0	0–0	2–1	2–3	—	0–0	3–0	2–1	1–0	1–2	1–2	0–1	2–2	0–1
Mérida	0–2	3–3	1–0	0–3	2–0	0–0	3–1	0–1	2–0	2–1	1–0	—	2–0	2–1	1–2	1–1	0–1	1–3	1–1	1–1
Pontevedra	1–1	1–0	1–2	1–1	1–3	2–0	1–0	1–1	0–0	3–1	0–0	1–5	—	0–2	1–1	1–1	2–1	2–1	3–0	1–1
Racing Ferrol	1–2	2–1	2–1	2–0	1–1	1–1	3–2	0–0	3–0	2–0	1–0	1–1	2–0	—	4–1	2–1	3–1	3–0	1–0	0–1
Rayo Majadahonda	1–2	0–2	2–2	1–0	1–2	1–0	1–1	0–0	4–1	1–2	1–1	1–1	2–1	0–1	—	1–2	2–1	2–2	2–1	1–0
Real Madrid Castilla	1–1	2–1	3–1	3–0	0–3	1–1	1–1	1–0	0–0	2–0	2–2	0–0	1–0	0–0	1–2	—	2–0	1–0	0–0	1–0
San Fernando	0–2	0–2	2–1	1–2	1–0	1–3	1–1	2–2	3–0	1–1	1–0	1–2	4–2	0–1	0–0	3–2	—	1–1	5–1	1–2
San Sebast. Reyes	1–0	0–0	1–3	0–1	1–1	0–0	1–1	0–0	0–1	2–0	0–2	1–0	2–0	0–3	1–2	1–5	1–0	—	0–2	1–1
Talavera de la Reina	0–2	3–0	2–1	1–0	2–0	0–0	2–3	0–1	1–0	2–3	0–0	1–1	4–2	0–1	0–2	2–7	0–0	0–1	—	0–1
Unionistas	2–1	0–0	0–0	0–3	1–0	0–0	2–0	2–1	1–1	1–1	1–0	0–1	1–0	1–1	2–1	3–0	1–1	1–0	1–2	—

Updated to match(es) played on 27 May 2023. Source:
Legend: Blue = home team win; Yellow = draw; Red = away team win.

=== Group 2 (East) ===
==== Teams and locations ====
Location of teams in 2022–23 Primera Federación – Group 2

Team	Home city	Stadium	Capacity
Alcoyano	Alcoy	El Collao	4,850
Amorebieta	Amorebieta-Etxano	Urritxe	3,000
Atlético Baleares	Palma	Estadi Balear	6,000
Barcelona Atlètic	Barcelona	Johan Cruyff	6,000
Bilbao Athletic	Bilbao	Lezama	3,250
Calahorra	Calahorra	La Planilla	4,500
Castellón	Castellón	Castalia	15,500
Cornellà	Cornellà de Llobregat	RCDE Stadium	40,000
Eldense	Elda	Nuevo Pepico Amat	4,036
Gimnàstic	Tarragona	Nou Estadi	14,591
Intercity	Alicante	Antonio Solana	3,000
La Nucía	La Nucía	Camilo Cano	3,000
SD Logroñés	Logroño	Las Gaunas	16,000
UD Logroñés	Logroño	Las Gaunas	16,000
Murcia	Murcia	Enrique Roca	31,179
Numancia	Soria	Los Pajaritos	8,261
Osasuna B	Pamplona	Tajonar	4,500
Real Sociedad B	San Sebastián	José Luis Orbegozo	2,500
Real Unión	Irun	Stadium Gal	5,000
Sabadell	Sabadell	Nova Creu Alta	11,908

==== Personnel and sponsorship ====
Team	Manager	Captain	Kit manufacturer	Shirt main sponsor
Alcoyano	(Spain) Vicente Parras	(Spain) Raúl González	Kappa	Unión Alcoyana Seguros
Amorebieta	(Spain) Haritz Mújika	(Spain) Iker Seguín	Nike	Sidenor
Atlético Baleares	(Spain) Tato	(Spain) Canario	Joma	Hyundai
Barcelona Atlètic	(Mexico) Rafael Márquez	(Spain) Arnau Tenas	Nike	Spotify
Bilbao Athletic	(Spain) Alex Pallarés	(Spain) Jon Sillero	New Balance	Kutxabank
Calahorra	(Spain) Carlos Pouso	(Spain) Miguel Martínez	Luanvi	Bodegas Marqués del Atrio
Castellón	(Spain) Albert Rudé	(Spain) David Cubillas	Macron	Techlam by Levantina
Cornellà	(Spain) Gonzalo Riutort	(Spain) Kike López	Patrick	Ascensores Eninter
Eldense	(Spain) Fernando Estévez	(Spain) Iván Forte	Nike	Finetwork
Gimnàstic	(Spain) Dani Vidal	(Spain) Joan Oriol	Umbro	Sorigué
Intercity	(Argentina) Alejandro Sandroni	(Spain) Manu Herrera	Macron	FacePhi
La Nucía	(Spain) Mario Cartagena	(Spain) Fofo	Joma	
SD Logroñés	(Spain) Raúl Llona	(Spain) Emilio Lozano	Logroño Deporte	Embalajes Blanco
UD Logroñés	(Spain) Sergio Rodríguez	(Spain) Iñaki Sáenz	Macron	Natur House
Murcia	(Spain) Mario Simón	(Spain) Pedro León	Adidas	Fibranet
Numancia	(Spain) Pablo Ayuso	(Spain) Borja San Emeterio	Erreà	
Osasuna B	(Spain) Santi Castillejo	(Spain) Jonatan González	Adidas	Verleal
Real Sociedad B	(Spain) Sergio Francisco	(Spain) Aritz Arambarri	Macron	Kutxabank
Real Unión	(Spain) Iñaki Goikoetxea	(Spain) Txusta	Zebra	BM Supermercados
Sabadell	(Spain) Miki Lladó	(Spain) Guillem Molina	Hummel	Laboratorio Cerba Internacional

==== League table ====
Pos	Team	Pld	W	D	L	GF	GA	GD	Pts	Qualification
1	Amorebieta (C, P)	38	19	12	7	48	29	+19	69 (Note: Amorebieta finished ahead of Eldense on head-to-head points: Eldense–Amorebieta 1–1, Amorebieta–Eldense 1–0)	Promotion to Segunda División and qualification for the Copa del Rey
2	Eldense (O, P)	38	19	12	7	50	28	+22	69	Qualification for the promotion play-offs and Copa del Rey
3	Castellón	38	16	14	8	46	32	+14	62	Qualification for the promotion play-offs and Copa del Rey
4	Barcelona Atlètic	38	16	13	9	45	38	+7	61	Qualification for the promotion play-offs
5	Real Sociedad B	38	14	18	6	50	34	+16	60	Qualification for the promotion play-offs
6	Murcia	38	14	14	10	49	33	+16	56	Qualification for the Copa del Rey
7	Osasuna B	38	15	8	15	51	45	+6	53 (Note: Osasuna B finished ahead of Gimnàstic on head-to-head points: Osasuna B–Gimnàstic 3–0, Gimnàstic–Osasuna B 1–1)	
8	Gimnàstic	38	14	11	13	37	43	−6	53	Qualification for the Copa del Rey
9	SD Logroñés	38	13	12	13	40	43	−3	51	
10	Sabadell	38	13	11	14	42	43	−1	50	
11	Cornellà	38	12	13	13	34	42	−8	49 (Note: Cornellà finished ahead of Intercity on head-to-head points: Intercity–Cornellà 1–2, Cornellà–Intercity 0–0)	
12	Intercity	38	12	13	13	45	44	+1	49	
13	Real Unión	38	13	9	16	39	48	−9	48	
14	Atlético Baleares	38	11	14	13	44	46	−2	47 (Note: Goal difference: Atlético Baleares -2, Alcoyano -5)	
15	Alcoyano	38	11	14	13	36	41	−5	47	
16	Numancia (R)	38	11	13	14	31	36	−5	46 (Note: Numancia finished ahead of La Nucía on head-to-head points: Numancia–La Nucía 2–0, La Nucía–Numancia 0–1)	Relegation to Segunda Federación
17	La Nucía (R)	38	9	19	10	39	45	−6	46	Relegation to Segunda Federación
18	UD Logroñés (R)	38	7	15	16	25	33	−8	36	Relegation to Segunda Federación
19	Calahorra (R)	38	7	12	19	31	52	−21	33	Relegation to Segunda Federación
20	Bilbao Athletic (R)	38	5	11	22	27	54	−27	26	Relegation to Segunda Federación

Updated to match(es) played on 27 May 2023. Source:
Rules for classification: 1) points; 2) head-to-head points; 3) head-to-head goal difference; 4) goal difference; 5) number of goals scored
(C) Champions; (O) Play-off winners; (P) Promoted; (R) Relegated

==== Results ====
Home \ Away	ALC	AMO	ATB	BAR	ATH	CAL	CAS	COR	ELD	GIM	INT	LNU	SDL	UDL	MUR	NUM	OSA	RSO	RUN	SAB
Alcoyano	—	1–0	2–1	0–0	3–3	3–0	0–1	1–0	0–0	1–1	1–1	1–1	2–0	0–1	1–2	0–0	0–1	1–1	1–1	2–1
Amorebieta	1–0	—	0–0	0–0	3–0	1–0	2–1	2–0	1–0	1–1	1–0	2–0	4–2	1–0	2–1	1–2	2–0	1–2	2–1	2–2
Atlético Baleares	3–2	0–1	—	3–2	2–0	0–0	1–1	2–3	3–1	2–1	0–0	1–1	0–0	1–2	0–3	4–1	3–2	1–2	1–1	0–1
Barcelona Atlètic	3–0	1–1	2–2	—	2–0	2–0	3–2	0–0	1–0	1–0	0–2	2–1	3–0	1–0	2–0	1–2	1–0	1–1	2–1	1–4
Bilbao Athletic	1–3	0–0	0–1	1–1	—	2–3	0–2	2–2	0–1	0–0	1–0	1–2	0–2	3–0	0–3	0–1	1–0	1–1	0–1	2–2
Calahorra	1–1	0–1	1–1	0–1	1–2	—	1–1	2–3	0–1	0–0	2–1	1–3	0–1	0–0	1–1	0–0	1–4	1–1	3–0	1–1
Castellón	1–0	1–0	2–1	1–1	2–0	1–2	—	1–0	2–0	0–0	1–0	4–1	1–0	0–0	1–0	0–1	2–0	1–1	1–1	3–1
Cornellà	2–0	0–2	1–0	4–3	1–0	2–3	0–0	—	1–1	1–0	0–0	0–0	1–1	0–0	0–0	1–0	1–3	2–2	1–1	1–0
Eldense	2–2	1–1	2–1	2–2	1–0	4–0	1–1	2–0	—	2–1	2–0	2–0	3–1	2–1	1–0	0–0	0–0	2–2	2–0	1–0
Gimnàstic	3–0	1–0	1–3	1–0	0–0	3–2	2–1	1–0	0–4	—	1–3	0–0	0–0	2–2	3–2	1–0	1–1	2–0	0–1	0–1
Intercity	4–1	0–0	2–2	0–0	1–0	1–0	3–1	1–2	1–1	1–2	—	2–2	1–0	2–2	1–3	1–1	2–1	5–2	1–2	1–1
La Nucía	1–1	1–2	1–1	1–0	3–1	2–1	1–1	1–1	1–0	1–1	0–0	—	2–2	2–2	0–0	0–1	0–0	1–1	1–1	1–0
SD Logroñés	0–1	1–1	1–2	4–0	1–1	0–2	2–1	1–0	2–1	1–2	1–0	3–2	—	0–0	1–0	1–1	1–1	0–0	1–0	0–1
UD Logroñés	0–1	1–1	0–0	1–1	0–1	0–0	0–1	0–1	0–0	0–1	0–1	1–1	1–3	—	0–1	1–0	2–0	1–1	1–0	3–0
Murcia	1–0	0–0	0–1	1–1	3–1	0–0	1–1	4–0	1–2	2–0	0–1	0–0	4–2	1–0	—	0–0	1–4	1–1	0–0	3–1
Numancia	0–1	2–3	0–0	0–0	0–0	0–1	0–0	1–2	0–0	3–1	0–1	2–0	1–3	1–0	1–1	—	4–1	1–0	0–2	3–3
Osasuna B	1–0	2–1	0–0	0–1	3–2	3–1	1–3	1–0	0–2	3–0	5–1	1–2	0–1	1–0	2–2	2–1	—	0–1	4–2	2–0
Real Sociedad B	1–1	0–1	2–0	2–0	0–0	3–0	1–1	1–1	2–0	2–0	2–1	2–3	3–0	0–0	1–2	3–0	0–0	—	2–0	1–1
Real Unión	1–2	4–3	2–0	0–1	2–1	1–0	1–1	2–0	0–1	2–3	2–2	2–0	1–1	0–3	1–5	1–0	1–0	0–1	—	0–1
Sabadell	0–0	1–1	3–1	1–2	1–0	1–0	3–1	1–0	1–3	0–1	2–1	2–0	0–0	2–0	0–0	0–1	2–2	1–2	0–1	—

Updated to match(es) played on 27 May 2023. Source:
Legend: Blue = home team win; Yellow = draw; Red = away team win.

== Final ==
The winners of the two regular season groups will face off in a two-leg final to determine the overall champion.

3 June 2023
18:00 UTC+2

Amorebieta (Basque Country (autonomous community))	3–0	(Galicia (Spain)) Racing Ferrol
Unai Buján 41'; Ewan Urain 46'; M. Pradera 47'

Urritxe, Amorebieta-Etxano

10 June 2023
18:00 UTC+2

Racing Ferrol (Galicia (Spain))	2–0	(Basque Country (autonomous community)) Amorebieta
Javier Murua 78' (o.g.); Héber Pena 84'

Estadio Municipal da Malata, Ferrol, Spain

Amorebieta won 3–2 on aggregate and were therefore crowned 2022–23 Primera Federación champions.

== Top goalscorers ==
Rank	Player	Team	Goals
1	(Spain) Rodri	Ceuta	20
1	(Spain) Sergio Arribas	Real Madrid Castilla	20
3	(Spain) Alberto Quiles	Deportivo La Coruña	17
4	(Spain) Pedro León	Murcia	15
4	(Spain) Eneko Jauregi	Amorebieta	15
4	(Spain) Rodrigo Escudero	Talavera de la Reina	15

== Attendances ==
The top 10 clubs with the highest average home attendance:

#	Club	Average
1	Deportivo de La Coruña	19,028
2	Real Murcia	12,738
3	Córdoba	11,817
4	Castellón	8,822
5	Badajóz	5,586
6	Ferrol	4,366
7	Leonesa	4,186
8	Gimnàstic de Tarragona	3,949
9	Algeciras	3,927
10	Logroñés	3,652

== See also ==
- 2022–23 La Liga
- 2022–23 Segunda División
- 2022–23 Segunda Federación
- 2022–23 Tercera Federación
