= Sivori =

Sivori is an Italian surname. Notable people with the surname include:

- Camillo Sivori (1817–1894), Italian virtuoso violinist and composer
- Eduardo Sívori (1847–1918), Argentine artist widely regarded as his country's first realist painter
- Francesco Sivori (1771–1830), Italian admiral of the Kingdom of Sardinia
- Omar Sívori (1935–2005), Argentine-Italian football striker and manager
- Regina María Sívori (1911–1981), mother of Pope Francis

== See also ==
- Sívori (footballer)
- Eduardo Sívori Museum
