= Urain =

Urain is a surname. Notable people with the surname include:

- Ewan Urain (born 2000), Spanish footballer
- Gerhard Urain (born 1972), Austrian cross-country skier
