= Víctor Basadre =

Spanish football manager (born 1970)

Personal information
- Full name: Víctor Manuel Basadre Orozco
- Date of birth: 16 February 1970 (age 56)
- Place of birth: Lugo, Spain

Team information
- Current team: Eldense B (manager)

Senior career*
Years	Team	Apps	(Gls)
- Comercial-Estudiantes

Managerial career
- 1989–1991: Comercial-Estudiantes
- 1991–1992: Castroverde
- 1992–1993: Quiroga
- 1993–1994: Mérida (assistant)
- 1995–1996: Xove Lago
- 1996–1997: Mindoniense
- 1997–1998: Murcia (assistant)
- 1998–1999: Murcia B
- 1999–2000: As Pontes
- 2001: Lugo
- 2003–2005: Noja
- 2005–2006: Caravaca
- 2006–2007: Lorca Deportiva (assistant)
- 2007: Lorca Deportiva
- 2008–2009: Murcia Deportivo
- 2010–2011: Puente Tocinos
- 2011–2012: Murcia (youth)
- 2012–2013: Cieza (youth)
- 2013–2014: UCAM Murcia (youth)
- 2015–2017: Cartagena B
- 2017–2018: Murcia B
- 2017: Murcia (interim)
- 2019–2020: Volos (assistant)
- 2019–2020: Volos (interim)
- 2020: Formentera
- 2021–2022: Sūduva
- 2022: Spartaks Jūrmala
- 2023: Doxa Katokopias
- 2023: Linense
- 2023–2025: Puebla de Soto (youth)
- 2024: Melilla
- 2025: Beroe Stara Zagora
- 2026–: Eldense B
- * Club domestic league appearances and goals

Víctor Manuel Basadre Orozco (born 16 February 1970) is a Spanish football manager, currently in charge of CD Eldense B.

== Career ==
Basadre was born in Lugo, Galicia, and after a footballing career at SG Comercial-Estudiantes he began his managerial career with clubs in his native region. In 1997, he joined Real Murcia as Vicente Campillo's assistant, and was appointed as the reserves' manager in the following year.

Basadre subsequently returned to his native Galicia, managing CD As Pontes and CD Lugo and being sacked from the latter on 19 September 2001. After spells at SD Noja and Caravaca CF, he joined Lorca Deportiva CF as an assistant in 2006, being named manager of the latter on 7 March 2007.

On 17 July 2009, after a spell at Murcia Deportivo CF, Basadre was named in Unai Emery's staff at Valencia CF. On 8 July 2011, after a season at FC Puente Tocinos, he was appointed at the helm of Murcia's Juvenil C squad.

After being in charge of the Juvenil sides of CD Cieza and UCAM Murcia CF, Basadre returned to a senior team in 2015, being in charge of newly-established FC Cartagena B. On 12 May 2017, he was dismissed from the side after it was revealed that he had agreed to a deal back at Murcia's B-team.

On 2 October 2017, Basadre was named interim manager of Murcia, replacing Manolo Sanlúcar. He returned to his previous role after the arrival of José María Salmerón, before being replaced by Javi Motos the following June.

In 2019, Basadre moved abroad for the first time in his career, being an assistant of Juan Ferrando at Greek side Volos FC. He became an interim in December of that year, after Ferrando was unavailable due to an illness, but the duo were replaced by compatriot Alberto Gallego on 5 January 2020.

On 26 February 2020, Basadre returned to his home country after being named at the helm of SD Formentera in the Tercera División. He left on 24 May, before taking over FK Sūduva in Lithuania on 5 January 2021.

Sacked on 4 April 2022, Basadre switched teams and countries again in July, taking over FK Spartaks Jūrmala in Latvia. On 13 October, he was dismissed from the latter side, and moved to Doxa Katokopias FC in Cyprus on 13 January 2023, but only lasted ten days on the role.

On 11 April 2023, Basadre returned to Spain after being appointed manager of Real Balompédica Linense in the Primera Federación. He left after suffering relegation, and subsequently joined CD Puebla de Soto in September, as manager of the Infantil B squad while also acting as youth coordinator.

On 5 March 2024, Basadre was named in charge of UD Melilla also in division three, but was again unable to prevent relegation. He subsequently returned to his previous club Puebla, before taking over Bulgarian side PFC Beroe Stara Zagora in July 2025.

Dismissed by Beroe after just six matches in September 2025, Basadre spent nearly a year without a club before taking over another reserve team, CD Eldense B in Tercera Federación, on 14 July 2026.
