= 2021 Segunda División B play-offs =

Spanish football league play-offs

The 2021 Segunda División B play-offs (Playoffs de Ascenso or Promoción de Ascenso) were the final play-offs for promotion from 2020–21 Segunda División B to the 2021–22 Segunda División. Due to the new format, the three first placed teams in each one of the five promotion groups, along with the best fourth placed team qualified for the promotion play-offs.

== Venues ==
On 30 April 2021, the Royal Spanish Football Federation announced that the play-offs would be played in four locations of Extremadura.

Location	Stadium	Capacity
Badajoz	Nuevo Vivero	14,175
Almendralejo	Francisco de la Hera	11,580
Villanueva de la Serena	Romero Cuerda	6,000
Don Benito	Vicente Sanz	5,000

== Format ==
For the last time four teams promoted from Segunda División B to Segunda División. Since the 2021–22 season the promotion will be played in the Primera División RFEF. The competition for these places is reserved this season for the first three classified from each of the five groups that make up the entire Segunda B, as well as the best fourth classified that was resolved by a final score based on points per game. There being odd groups this season, the champions' route that gave a double chance of promotion to teams that were group champions is eliminated.

After a season marked by the limitations derived from the COVID-19 pandemic, the RFEF decided to carry out the promotion in a format like the previous season's. It was developed through the elimination system, a single match. It took place in Extremadura, in a concentration format, and consisted of two qualifying rounds in which the matches were determined by drawing lots, pitting those who would have obtained a better classification against those who would have obtained a worse classification, avoiding, as far as possible, that they face each other two teams that would have belonged to the same group.

In case of a tie there would have been extra time. If the tie persisted, the highest ranked team in the regular phase would have passed, with penalties to follow if both teams finished in the same position of their group.

The four winning clubs of the second round were promoted to the Segunda División. The remaining clubs were assigned to the Primera División RFEF next season.

== First round ==
=== Qualified teams ===
Group	Position	Team
1	1st	Burgos
2	1st	Real Sociedad B
3	1st	Ibiza
4	1st	Linares
5	1st	Badajoz

Group	Position	Team
1	2nd	Celta Vigo B
2	2nd	Athletic Bilbao B
3	2nd	Barcelona B
4	2nd	UCAM Murcia
5	2nd	San Sebastián de los Reyes

Group	Position	Team
1	3rd	Zamora
2	3rd	Amorebieta
3	3rd	Andorra
4	3rd	Algeciras
5	3rd	Real Madrid Castilla

Group	Position	Team
2	4th	Calahorra

=== Matches ===
Team 1	Score	Team 2
Burgos	1–0 (a.e.t.)	Calahorra
Real Sociedad B	2–1 (a.e.t.)	Andorra
Linares	1–2	Amorebieta
San Sebastián de los Reyes	1–3	Algeciras
Badajoz	2–0	Zamora
Ibiza (s.)	0–0 (a.e.t.)	Real Madrid Castilla
UCAM Murcia	2–2 (a.e.t.) (5–4 p)	Barcelona B
Athletic Bilbao B	2–1	Celta Vigo B

15 May 2021	San Sebastián de los Reyes	1–3	Algeciras	Villanueva de la Serena
12:00 (CEST)	Marcelo 20'	Report	Llinares 2'; Romero 52'; Raúl 58'	Stadium: Romero Cuerda; Referee: Germán Cid Camacho

15 May 2021	Burgos	1–0 (a.e.t.)	Calahorra	Don Benito
18:00 (CEST)	Juanma 95' (pen.)	Report		Stadium: Vicente Sanz; Referee: Alejandro Quintero González

15 May 2021	Real Sociedad B	2–1 (a.e.t.)	Andorra	Almendralejo
20:00 (CEST)	Navarro 7' (pen.); Lobete 113'	Report	Riverola 37'	Stadium: Francisco de la Hera; Referee: Manuel Pozueta Rodríguez

15 May 2021	Linares	1–2	Amorebieta	Badajoz
20:00 (CEST)	Lara 69'	Report	Álvaro 28'; Orozko 79'	Stadium: Nuevo Vivero; Referee: Antonio Sánchez Sánchez

16 May 2021	UCAM Murcia	2–2 (a.e.t.) (5–4 p)	Barcelona B	Don Benito
12:00 (CEST)	Alberto 20'; Xemi 80'	Report	Manaj 46', 64'	Stadium: Vicente Sanz; Referee: Fernando Román Román
	Penalties
	Viti (penalty scored); Santi Jara (penalty missed) de Vicente (penalty missed); Aketxe (penalty missed); Xemi (penalty scored); Espina (penalty missed); Moreno (penalty scored); Romera (penalty scored); Josete (penalty scored)		de la Fuente (penalty missed); Collado (penalty scored); Pereira (penalty scored); Peque (penalty missed); Manaj (penalty missed); Busquets (penalty missed); Balde (penalty scored); Riera (penalty scored); Ramos Mingo (penalty missed)

16 May 2021	Ibiza	0–0 (a.e.t.)	Real Madrid Castilla	Badajoz
12:00 (CEST)		Report		Stadium: Nuevo Vivero; Referee: Iván Caparrós Hernández

16 May 2021	Athletic Bilbao B	2–1	Celta Vigo B	Villanueva de la Serena
20:15 (CEST)	Cabo 63'; Ewan 68'	Report	Losada 82'	Stadium: Romero Cuerda; Referee: Andrés Fuentes Molina

16 May 2021	Badajoz	2–0	Zamora	Almendralejo
22:00 (CEST)	Concha 27'; Aquino 45+2' (pen.)	Report		Stadium: Francisco de la Hera; Referee: José Luis Guzmán Mansilla

== Second round ==
=== Qualified teams ===
Group	Position	Team
1	1st	Burgos
2	1st	Real Sociedad B
3	1st	Ibiza
5	1st	Badajoz

Group	Position	Team
2	2nd	Athletic Bilbao B
4	2nd	UCAM Murcia

Group	Position	Team
2	3rd	Amorebieta
4	3rd	Algeciras

=== Matches ===
Team 1	Score	Team 2
Burgos	1–0 (a.e.t.)	Athletic Bilbao B
Real Sociedad B	2–1 (a.e.t.)	Algeciras
Ibiza	1–0	UCAM Murcia
Badajoz	0–1	Amorebieta

22 May 2021	Real Sociedad B	2–1 (a.e.t.)	Algeciras	Almendralejo
20:00 (CEST)	Figueras 62' (own); Karrikaburu 105'	Report	Ezkurdia 51' (own)	Stadium: Francisco de la Hera; Referee: Mateo Busquets Ferrer

22 May 2021	Badajoz	0–1	Amorebieta	Badajoz
22:00 (CEST)		Report	Bilbao 22'	Stadium: Nuevo Vivero; Referee: Raúl Martín González Francés

23 May 2021	Ibiza	1–0	UCAM Murcia	Badajoz
12:00 (CEST)	Zenitagoia 70'	Report		Stadium: Nuevo Vivero; Referee: Víctor García Verdura

23 May 2021	Burgos	1–0 (a.e.t.)	Athletic Bilbao B	Almendralejo
20:00 (CEST)	Berjón 107'	Report		Stadium: Francisco de la Hera; Referee: Manuel Ángel Pérez Hernández

Promoted to Segunda División
Real Sociedad B (59 years later)	Amorebieta (First time ever)	Ibiza (First time ever)	Burgos (19 years later)

== Promoted teams ==
- The 24 teams that were promoted to Primera División RFEF through promotion groups, the eight first round losers, and the four second round losers are included.
- All 36 clubs from Segunda División B qualified for the first time ever to the new third tier.

Promoted to Primera División RFEF
Alcoyano	Algeciras	FC Andorra	Athletic Bilbao B	Atlético Baleares	Atlético Sanluqueño	Badajoz	Barcelona B	Betis Deportivo
Calahorra	Celta de Vigo B	Cornellà	Cultural Leonesa	Deportivo La Coruña	Extremadura	Gimnàstic	Internacional	Linares
Linense	Llagostera	SD Logroñés	Rayo Majadahonda	Real Madrid Castilla	San Fernando	San Sebastián de los Reyes	Talavera de la Reina	Tudelano
UCAM Murcia	Unionistas	Racing Ferrol	Racing Santander	Real Unión	Sevilla Atlético	Valladolid Promesas	Villarreal B	Zamora
