= Iñigo Orozco =

Spanish footballer

Personal information
- Full name: Iñigo Orozco Andonegui
- Date of birth: 16 July 1993 (age 33)
- Place of birth: San Sebastián, Spain
- Height: 1.92 m (6 ft 4 in)
- Position: Forward

Youth career
- Leioa

Senior career*
Years	Team	Apps	(Gls)
2012–2013	Deusto		
2013–2014	Bermeo	19	(2)
2014–2017	Santutxu	94	(17)
2017–2018	Sestao	33	(14)
2018–2022	Amorebieta	113	(13)
2022–2024	Barakaldo	62	(16)
- * Club domestic league appearances and goals as of 1 June 2024

Iñigo Orozco Andonegui (born 24 February 1993), sometimes referred to as Iñigo Orozko, is a Spanish footballer who plays as a forward.

== Club career ==
Orozco was born in San Sebastián, Gipuzkoa, Basque Country. After finishing his formation with SD Leioa, he made his senior debut with SD Deusto in the regional leagues before joining Tercera División side Bermeo FT in 2013.

In 2014, Orozco moved to fellow fourth division side Santutxu FC, being the club's top goalscorer in the 2016–17 season as they narrowly avoided relegation. On 6 June 2017, he signed for Sestao River Club in the same category, and scored a career-best 15 goals during the campaign as his side missed out promotion in the play-offs.

On 20 July 2018, Orozco was presented at Segunda División B side SD Amorebieta. In the 2020–21 season, he scored twice as his side achieved a first-ever promotion to Segunda División; one of his goals was the winner in a 2–1 away success over Linares Deportivo, which qualified the club to the final stage of the play-offs.

Orozco made his professional debut on 14 August 2021, coming on as a second-half substitute for Iker Unzueta in a 0–2 away loss against Girona FC.

== Personal life ==
While playing amateur football, Orozco also worked as a biology and geology teacher in an institute in Andoain.
