= Juanma (footballer, born 1980) =

Spanish association football player

Personal information
- Full name: Juan Manuel Barrero Barrero
- Date of birth: 27 June 1980 (age 46)
- Place of birth: Don Álvaro, Spain
- Height: 1.84 m (6 ft 0 in)
- Position: Goalkeeper

Youth career
- Nueva Ciudad
- 1998–1999: Mérida UD

Senior career*
Years	Team	Apps	(Gls)
1999–2000	Mérida UD B		
2000–2002	Mérida UD	66	(0)
2002–2003	Atlético Madrid B	16	(0)
2003–2004	Atlético Madrid	13	(0)
2004–2005	Numancia	30	(0)
2006	Mérida UD	18	(0)
2006–2008	Universidad LP	20	(0)
2009	Atlético Ciudad	7	(0)
2009–2010	Alcorcón	32	(0)
2010–2011	Aris	5	(0)
2011–2013	Cartagena	26	(0)
2013	Ponferradina	0	(0)
2013–2014	Arroyo	33	(0)
2014–2015	Extremadura	12	(0)
Total		278	(0)

Managerial career
- 2018–2019: Mérida AD (youth)
- 2020: Mérida AD
- 2020–2021: Albacete (assistant)
- 2022–2023: Mérida AD
- 2023–2024: Atlético Baleares
- 2024–2026: Tarazona
- * Club domestic league appearances and goals

Juan Manuel Barrero Barrero (born 27 June 1980), known as Juanma, is a Spanish former professional footballer who played as a goalkeeper. He is currently a manager.

He spent most of his 16-year senior career in the Spanish lower leagues. He appeared in 38 La Liga games over three seasons, with Atlético Madrid and Numancia.

== Playing career ==
Juanma was born in Don Álvaro, Province of Badajoz, Extremadura. After beginning with local side Mérida UD, he signed for Atlético Madrid in summer 2002, starting out at their reserves. He played twice with the first team in his first season, then 11 times in the 2003–04 campaign as all goalkeepers (himself, Germán Burgos and Sergio Aragoneses) appeared in roughly the same matches and they eventually qualified for the UEFA Intertoto Cup.

Juanma then spent two seasons with CD Numancia, starting in his first but being relegated from La Liga. He left in 2006, resuming his career in the lower leagues: Mérida again, Universidad de Las Palmas CF, CF Atlético Ciudad and AD Alcorcón.

In mid-July 2010, after helping Alcorcón promote for the first time in its history to Segunda División – he was also in goal in the club's historic elimination of Real Madrid in the Copa del Rey– the 30-year-old Juanma moved abroad, joining a host of compatriots at Aris Thessaloniki F.C. with whom he agreed to a two-year contract. At the end of a sole season in Greece, he returned to his country and joined second-tier FC Cartagena.

Juanma signed with SD Ponferradina of the second division in January 2013, but made no appearances during his five-month spell.

== Coaching career ==
On 28 February 2020, Juanma was appointed manager of Mérida AD in the Segunda División B; prior to this, he had already worked in the club's structure as goalkeeper coach, director of the academy and assistant. He was only on the bench for two games, before the competition was suspended due to the COVID-19 pandemic.

Juanma returned to the Estadio Romano in January 2022, following an assistant manager spell at Albacete Balompié. He announced his departure on 29 May 2023, having overseen promotion to Primera Federación and an eighth-place finish the following season.

On 27 September 2023, Juanma was named head coach of CD Atlético Baleares by replacing the sacked Tato. He was himself dismissed on 12 March 2024.

Juanma remained in the third tier in the 2024–25 campaign, on a contract at SD Tarazona. On 24 June 2025, after achieving a sixth place with 54 points, he signed a new one-year deal.

== Managerial statistics ==
As of match played 19 April 2026

Managerial record by team and tenure
Team	Nat	From	To	Record								Ref
Team	Nat	From	To	G	W	D	L	GF	GA	GD	Win %	Ref
Mérida AD	(Spain)	28 February 2020	9 June 2020	2	1	1	0	3	2	+1	50.00	
Mérida AD	(Spain)	16 January 2022	29 May 2023	59	28	16	15	75	52	+23	47.46	
Atlético Baleares	(Spain)	27 September 2023	12 March 2024	22	5	5	12	12	34	−22	22.73	
Tarazona	(Spain)	1 July 2024	Present	72	24	23	25	71	70	+1	33.33	
Total				155	58	45	52	161	158	+3	37.42	—
