= Sívori (footballer) =

Spanish footballer

Personal information
- Full name: Arturo Igoroin Sanjurjo
- Date of birth: 14 September 1976 (age 50)
- Place of birth: Vitoria-Gasteiz, Spain
- Height: 1.81 m (5 ft 11 in)
- Position: Forward

Team information
- Current team: Cartagena (board)

Youth career
- Aranbizkarra
- 1990–1995: Alavés

Senior career*
Years	Team	Apps	(Gls)
1995–1997	Alavés B	66	(10)
1996–1999	Alavés	75	(11)
1999–2001	Athletic Bilbao	13	(0)
2000–2001	→ Córdoba (loan)	32	(1)
2001–2003	Leganés	71	(9)
2003–2008	Cartagena	168	(39)
2008–2010	Águilas	67	(11)
2010–2011	Caravaca	28	(4)
2011–2012	Mar Menor		
2012–2014	La Unión	?	(19)
Total		520	(102)

Managerial career
- 2014–2015: La Unión (youth)
- 2015–2017: La Unión (assistant)
- 2017–2018: La Unión
- 2018–2019: La Unión Atlético
- 2020–2021: Cartagena (assistant)
- * Club domestic league appearances and goals

Arturo Igoroin Sanjurjo (born 14 September 1976) is a Spanish retired professional footballer who played as a forward, and is a current board member of FC Cartagena.

== Playing career ==
Born in Vitoria-Gasteiz, Álava, Basque Country, Sívori joined Deportivo Alavés' youth setup at the age of 14. After making his senior debut with the reserves in Tercera División, he first appeared with the main squad on 4 September 1996, coming on as a half-time substitute in a 1–0 away win against Cultural y Deportiva Leonesa, for the season's Copa del Rey.

Sívori became a regular starter for Alavés in the 1997–98 campaign, as his side achieved promotion to La Liga. On 1 July 1998, he agreed to a move to Athletic Bilbao for a fee of 348 million pesetas, effective as of July 1999; he remained with the Babazorros for a further year, making his debut in the main category on 29 August 1998 by starting in a 0–0 home draw against Real Betis.

In 2000, after featuring sparingly for Athletic, Sívori was loaned to Córdoba CF in the second division, for one year. He was released by the Lions in July 2001, and subsequently signed for CD Leganés also in division two.

In 2003, Sívori agreed to a contract with FC Cartagena in Segunda División B, where he acted as team captain during his five-year spell. On 11 July 2008, he moved to fellow league team Águilas CF.

Sívori subsequently represented lower league sides Caravaca CF, Mar Menor CF and La Unión CF, helping the latter to achieve promotion to the fourth division in 2013 by scoring a career-best 12 goals. He retired in 2014, aged 38.

== Managerial career ==
Immediately after retiring Sívori became a coach, being a manager of his last club La Unión CF's youth setup. In 2015, he became an assistant manager of the main squad, before being appointed manager in July 2017.

In July 2018, Sívori became the manager of FC La Unión Atlético also in the fourth division, after the board acquired the place of FC Pinatar Arena. He was sacked the following March, and subsequently became a sporting director.

In August 2019, Sívori returned to his former side Cartagena, to work in the club's board. In March 2020, he became Borja Jiménez's assistant in the main squad.
