= Gabri Jimeno =

Spanish footballer

Personal information
- Full name: Gabriel Jimeno Felipe
- Date of birth: 29 December 2003 (age 22)
- Place of birth: Elda, Spain
- Height: 1.78 m (5 ft 10 in)
- Position: Forward

Team information
- Current team: Cartagena B
- Number: 33

Youth career
- Idella
- 2017–2021: Kelme
- 2021–2022: UCAM Murcia

Senior career*
Years	Team	Apps	(Gls)
2022–2023	UCAM Murcia B	30	(3)
2022–2023	UCAM Murcia	4	(1)
2023–2024	Eldense B	26	(11)
2024	Eldense	1	(0)
2024–2025	Sevilla C	31	(4)
2025	UCAM Murcia B	0	(0)
2025–	Cartagena B	25	(2)
2026–	Cartagena	1	(0)
- * Club domestic league appearances and goals as of 10 June 2026

Gabriel "Gabri" Jimeno Felipe (born 29 December 2003) is a Spanish footballer who plays as a forward for Tercera Federación club Cartagena B.

== Career ==
Jimeno was born in Elda, Alicante, Valencian Community, and represented Idella CF, Kelme CF and UCAM Murcia CF as a youth. On 16 February 2022, after making his senior debut with the latter's reserves, he renewed his contract with the club.

Jimeno also featured with UCAM's first team in their last three matches of the 2021–22 Primera División RFEF season, also scoring their last goal of the campaign in a 2–1 home loss to FC Barcelona B. After another year featuring mainly with UCAM B, he moved to CD Eldense in 2023, being initially assigned to the B-team in the Lliga Comunitat.

Jimeno made his first team debut with the Azulgranas on 19 February 2024, coming on as a late substitute for Iván Chapela in a 1–0 Segunda División away loss to CD Tenerife.
