= Israel Martínez (football manager) =

Spanish football manager (born 1990)

Personal information
- Full name: Israel Martínez Prieto
- Date of birth: 25 June 1990 (age 36)
- Place of birth: Avilés, Spain

Team information
- Current team: Burgos B (manager)

Managerial career
- Years: Team
- 2016–2021: Cultural Leonesa (youth)
- 2021–2023: Júpiter Leonés
- 2023: Cultural Leonesa
- 2023–2024: Alavés C
- 2026–: Burgos B

Israel "Isra" Martínez Prieto (born 25 June 1990) is a Spanish football manager, currently in charge of Burgos CF Promesas.

== Career ==
Born in Avilés, Martínez got a degree in Physical Activity and Sports Science and during the summer of 2016, he joined the coaching structure of Cultural y Deportiva Leonesa, occupying several different positions – including the director of the youth academy. During the 2019–20 season, he was named manager of the Juvenil A squad of Cultu in the Liga Nacional Juvenil, and achieved promotion to the División de Honor Juvenil with the side.

On 26 April 2021, Martínez was appointed manager of Cultural's reserve team Júpiter Leonés, following the appointment of Ramón González in the first team. On 26 April 2023, after two years in charge of the reserve side, he took over the first team on a deal until the end of the season; he replaced sacked Eduardo Docampo. On his senior managerial debut four days later, his side drew 1–1 at home to RC Celta Fortuna.

On 31 May 2023, Martínez resigned as first team manager of Cultural, ending his seven-year stay at the club. On 24 June, he was appointed at the helm of Deportivo Alavés' C-team in Tercera Federación on a contract for the 2023–24 campaign.

On 26 November 2024, Martínez was sacked by Alavés C and Germán Beltrán replaced him. On 10 July 2026, after more than a year without a club, he took over another reserve team, Burgos CF Promesas also in the fifth division.

== Managerial statistics ==
As of 23 November 2024

Managerial record by team and tenure
Team	Nat	From	To	Record								Ref
Team	Nat	From	To	G	W	D	L	GF	GA	GD	Win %	Ref
Júpiter Leonés	(Spain)	26 April 2021	26 April 2023	66	24	19	23	82	75	+7	36.36	
Cultural Leonesa	(Spain)	26 April 2023	31 May 2023	5	2	1	2	5	5	+0	40.00	
Alavés C	(Spain)	24 June 2023	26 November 2024	46	12	12	22	41	60	−19	26.09	
Total				117	38	32	47	128	140	−12	32.48	—
