= CD Eldense B =

Association football club in Spain

Eldense B
- Full name: Club Deportivo Eldense "B"
- Founded: 1994
- Ground: Fernando Tomás, Elda, Valencian Community, Spain
- Capacity: 1,000
- President: Pascual Pérez Castillo
- Head coach: Víctor Basadre
- League: Tercera Federación – Group 6
- 2025–26: Lliga Comunitat – South, 1st of 16 (champions)
- Website: http://www.cdeldense.es/
Home colours	Away colours	Third colours

Club Deportivo Eldense "B" is a Spanish football team based in Elda, in the Valencian Community. The reserve team of CD Eldense, they were founded in 1994, and play in Tercera Federación – Group 6, holding home matches at Campo de Fútbol Fernando Tomás.

== History ==
Eldense B were founded in 1994 and played their six initial seasons in the Segunda Regional. After four years of inactivity, Eldense B returned to an active status in 2003, after taking Elda UD's place in the Primera Regional.

Inactive again during the 2005–06 season after being relegated from the Primera Regional, Eldense B returned to the seventh tier in the following campaign, before again achieving promotion in 2009. Relegated in 2010, the club returned to Segunda Regional, and went inactive in 2013 after spending one year back in the Primera Regional.

Eldense B returned to an active status in 2017, in the Segunda Regional. The club achieved promotion to the Primera Regional in June 2021, and reached a first-ever promotion to the Regional Preferente on 29 May 2022.

== Season to season ==
Season	Tier	Division	Place
1994–95	7	2ª Reg.	13th
1995–96	7	2ª Reg.	5th
1996–97	7	2ª Reg.	6th
1997–98	7	2ª Reg.	8th
1998–99	7	2ª Reg.	(R)
1999–2003	DNP		
2003–04	6	1ª Reg.	10th
2004–05	6	1ª Reg.	15th
2005–06	DNP		
2006–07	7	2ª Reg.	3rd
2007–08	7	2ª Reg.	3rd
2008–09	7	2ª Reg.	1st
2009–10	6	1ª Reg.	15th
2010–11	7	2ª Reg.	3rd
2011–12	7	2ª Reg.	1st
2012–13	6	1ª Reg.	8th
2013–2017	DNP		
2017–18	7	2ª Reg.	13th
2018–19	7	2ª Reg.	4th
2019–20	7	2ª Reg.	4th

Season	Tier	Division	Place
2020–21	7	2ª Reg.	1st
2021–22	7	1ª Reg.	2nd
2022–23	6	Reg. Pref.	4th
2023–24	6	Lliga Com.	5th
2024–25	6	Lliga Com.	10th
2025–26	6	Lliga Com.	1st
2026–27	5	3ª Fed.	

- 1 season in Tercera Federación

== Current squad ==
As of 14 September 2026.

Note: Flags indicate national team as defined under FIFA eligibility rules; some limited exceptions apply. Players may hold more than one non-FIFA nationality.

No.	Pos.	Nation	Player
1	GK	ESP	David Bernabéu
3	DF	ESP	Javi Pastor
4	DF	ESP	Alex Varó
5	DF	ESP	Alejandro Maciá
6	MF	ESP	Hugo González
7	FW	ESP	Jorge Pastor
8	MF	ESP	David Rodríguez
9	FW	ESP	Nico Ruiz
10	MF	ESP	Cristian Amarillo
11	FW	ESP	Sergio Cantó
12	DF	JPN	Shuto Kayamori
13	GK	ESP	Víctor Real
14	MF	ESP	David García

No.	Pos.	Nation	Player
15	DF	CMR	Fadil Montapon
16	MF	ESP	Fran Guerrero
17	DF	ESP	Antonio David
18	DF	ESP	Pablo Navarro
19	FW	ESP	Ceri Imadiyi
20	MF	ALG	Moha Belayachi
24	FW	SUR	Givon Derby
26	MF	ESP	Pablo Carretero
—	DF	ESP	Marcos González
—	MF	ESP	Javier Esteban
—	MF	URU	Mathias Delbono
—	FW	ESP	Iker Carbonell
—	FW	ESP	Juanjo Vilches

=== Reserve team ===
Note: Flags indicate national team as defined under FIFA eligibility rules; some limited exceptions apply. Players may hold more than one non-FIFA nationality.

No.	Pos.	Nation	Player
—	DF	ESP	Álvaro Mallebrera
—	DF	ESP	Darío Medina

== Notable players ==
- (Spain) Iván Forte
- (Spain) Gabri Jimeno

== See also ==
- CD Eldense
