= Ewan Urain =

Footballer (born 2000)

Personal information
- Full name: Ewan Roy Urain Aird
- Date of birth: 10 March 2000 (age 26)
- Place of birth: Durango, Spain
- Height: 1.92 m (6 ft 4 in)
- Position: Forward

Team information
- Current team: Manfredonia
- Number: 9

Youth career
- Durango
- 2015–2018: Athletic Bilbao

Senior career*
Years	Team	Apps	(Gls)
2018–2019	Basconia	29	(13)
2019–2023	Bilbao Athletic	49	(10)
2023	→ Amorebieta (loan)	18	(2)
2023–2024	Unionistas	13	(0)
2024	Badajoz	14	(2)
2024–2025	Navalcarnero	15	(5)
2025–	Manfredonia	5	(2)

International career^{‡}
2021	Scotland U21	2	(0)
- * Club domestic league appearances and goals as of 28 September 2025 ‡ National team caps and goals as of 5 June 2021

Ewan Roy Urain Aird (born 10 March 2000) is a professional footballer who plays as a forward for Italian Serie D club Manfredonia. Born in Spain, he represented Scotland at under-21 level.

== Background ==
Urain was born in Durango in the Basque region. His mother Diane grew up in Dumfriesshire, taught English abroad and met her Biscayan husband in Spain.

== Club career ==
After a spell with hometown side Durango, he joined Athletic Bilbao in 2015. He turned out for the club at under-16 and under-17 level before hitting 19 goals for the under-18 side. In 2018, he scored 13 goals for the club's farm team Basconia, based in Basauri.

He began to feature regularly for the B team in the 2020–21 season (though interrupted by injuries) as the side reached the play-offs for promotion to the second division, but lost in the last round.

He missed parts of the 2021–22 Primera Federación campaign with injuries, being used mainly as a late substitute when he was available, which continued at the start of 2022–23. In December 2022, he moved on loan to Amorebieta, playing at the same level as Bilbao Athletic, for the remainder of that season.

== International career ==
Urain was called up by Scotland Under-21s in 2021 for matches with Northern Ireland.

== Style of play ==
Urain has been described as an old-fashioned striker making use of his height and strength, and has been compared with former Athletic Bilbao player Fernando Llorente.

== Honours ==
Amorebieta

- Primera Federación: 2022–23 (Group 2 and overall champion)
