= 2020–21 Segunda División B =

Spanish association football season

Segunda División B
- Season: 2020–21
- Promoted: Real Sociedad B Amorebieta; Ibiza; Burgos
- Relegated: 26 teams

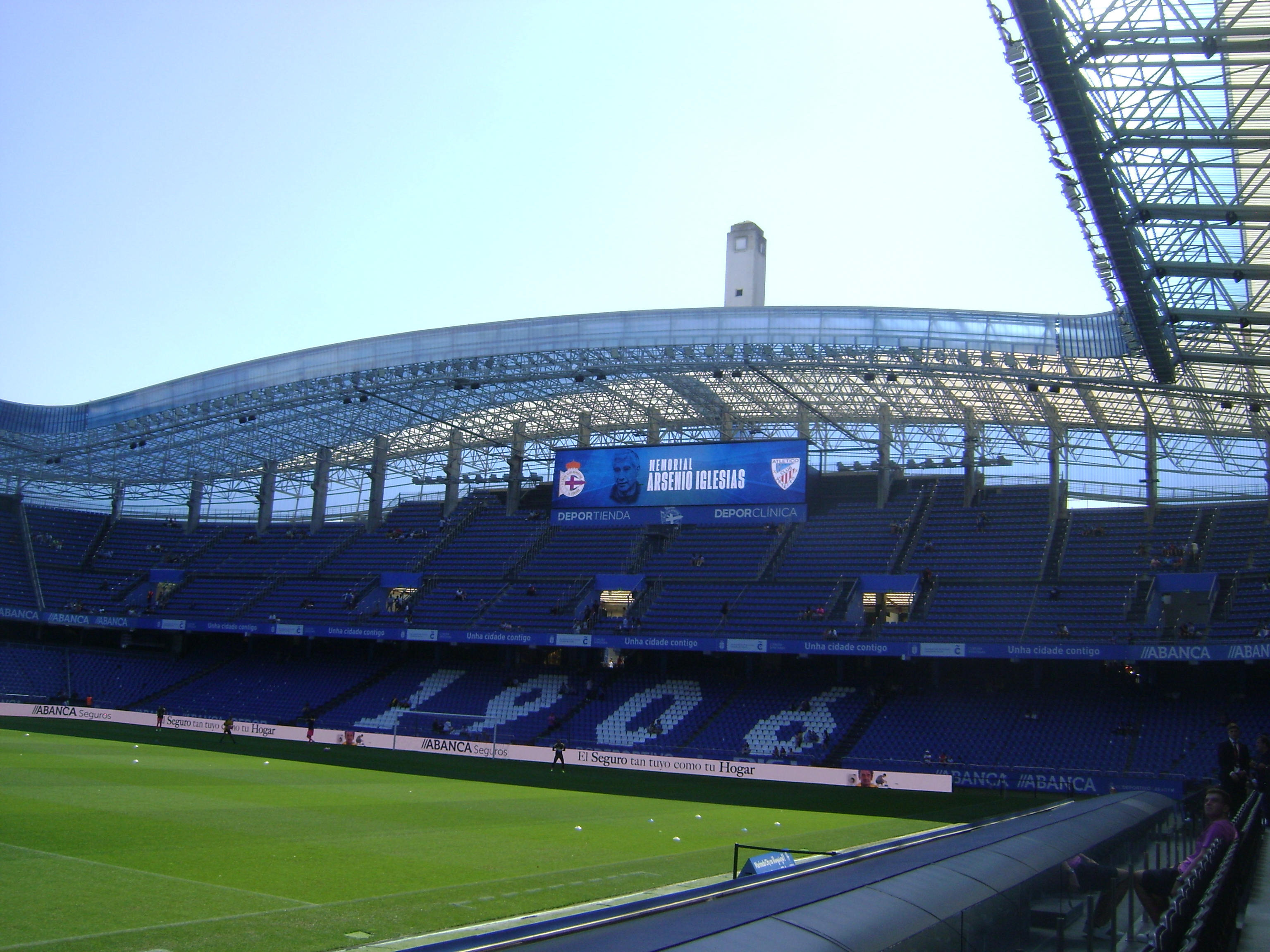
Riazor Stadium, 2023

The 2020–21 Segunda División B season was the 44th since its establishment and the last as the third tier. A total of 102 teams participated, and were distributed in three groups of 20 teams each and two groups of 21, with eight subgroups of ten teams each and two with eleven teams each.

On 6 May 2020, the Royal Spanish Football Federation announced the expansion of the league to what were initially five groups of 20 teams each for the 2020–21 season due to promotion from the Tercera División groups in the curtailed past season being applied.

The season began on 18 October, following approval by each of Spain's autonomous regions' health departments. For next season the Segunda División B was demoted to the fourth level and dropped the B in its name in favour of the federation's Spanish initials RFEF on the creation of a new, two-group, 40-team third division called Primera División RFEF.

== Overview before the season ==
102 teams joined the league, including four relegated from the 2019–20 Segunda División and 22 promoted from the 2019–20 Tercera División. No teams were relegated from the 2019–20 Segunda División B. The final groups were published on 31 August 2020.

Relegated from Segunda División

- Deportivo La Coruña
- Extremadura
- Numancia
- Racing Santander

Promoted from Tercera División

- Alcoyano
- Atzeneta
- Betis Deportivo
- Compostela
- Covadonga
- El Ejido
- L'Hospitalet
- Laredo
- Lealtad
- Linares
- Lorca Deportiva
- Marino
- Mutilvera
- Navalcarnero
- Poblense
- Portugalete
- SD Logroñés
- Socuéllamos
- Tamaraceite
- Tarazona
- Villanovense
- Zamora

== First phase ==
=== Group 1 ===
Location of teams in 2020–21 Segunda División B – Group 1
Red: Subgroup A; Green: Subgroup B
Location of teams in 2020–21 Segunda División B – Group 1 (Asturias)
Green: Subgroup B

==== Teams and locations ====
Team	Home city	Stadium	Capacity
Burgos	Burgos	El Plantío	12,194
Celta Vigo B	Vigo	Barreiro	4,500
Compostela	Santiago de Compostela	Vero Boquete	16,666
Coruxo	Vigo	O Vao	2,200
Covadonga	Oviedo	Juan Antonio Álvarez Rabanal	2,000
Cultural Leonesa	León	Reino de León	13,346
Deportivo La Coruña	A Coruña	Abanca-Riazor	32,660
Guijuelo	Guijuelo	Luis Ramos	1,500
Langreo	Langreo	Ganzábal	4,024
Lealtad	Villaviciosa	Les Caleyes	3,000
Marino Luanco	Luanco	Miramar	3,500
Numancia	Soria	Los Pajaritos	8,261
Oviedo B	Oviedo	El Requexón	3,000
Pontevedra	Pontevedra	Pasarón	12,000
Racing Ferrol	Ferrol	A Malata	12,043
Salamanca	Salamanca	Helmántico	17,341
Sporting Gijón B	Gijón	Pepe Ortiz	3,000
Unionistas	Salamanca	Reina Sofía	5,000
Valladolid Promesas	Valladolid	Anexos José Zorrilla	1,500
Zamora	Zamora	Ruta de la Plata	7,813

==== Subgroup 1A ====
Pos	Team	Pld	W	D	L	GF	GA	GD	Pts	Qualification
1	Celta Vigo B (C)	18	9	3	6	22	20	+2	30	Qualification for the promotion groups
2	Unionistas	18	8	6	4	17	10	+7	30	Qualification for the promotion groups
3	Zamora	18	8	6	4	18	17	+1	30	Qualification for the promotion groups
4	Deportivo La Coruña	18	8	5	5	14	10	+4	29	Qualification for the Primera División RFEF promotion groups
5	Racing Ferrol	18	7	6	5	22	17	+5	27	Qualification for the Primera División RFEF promotion groups
6	Compostela	18	5	10	3	20	16	+4	25	Qualification for the Primera División RFEF promotion groups
7	Pontevedra	18	5	6	7	19	19	0	21	Qualification for the relegation groups
8	Coruxo	18	6	2	10	16	23	−7	20	Qualification for the relegation groups
9	Salamanca	18	5	4	9	17	23	−6	19	Qualification for the relegation groups
10	Guijuelo	18	2	6	10	12	22	−10	12	Qualification for the relegation groups

Source: RFEF
Rules for classification: 1) points; 2) head-to-head points; 3) head-to-head goal difference; 4) goal difference; 5) number of goals scored
(C) Champions

==== Subgroup 1B ====
Pos	Team	Pld	W	D	L	GF	GA	GD	Pts	Qualification
1	Burgos (C)	18	12	3	3	24	12	+12	39	Qualification for the promotion groups
2	Cultural Leonesa	18	8	7	3	27	15	+12	31	Qualification for the promotion groups
3	Valladolid Promesas	18	8	6	4	24	17	+7	30	Qualification for the promotion groups
4	Numancia	18	6	7	5	23	14	+9	25	Qualification for the Primera División RFEF promotion groups
5	Langreo	18	6	7	5	21	20	+1	25	Qualification for the Primera División RFEF promotion groups
6	Marino Luanco	18	6	4	8	18	22	−4	22	Qualification for the Primera División RFEF promotion groups
7	Oviedo B	18	6	3	9	17	27	−10	21	Qualification for the relegation groups
8	Lealtad	18	4	8	6	11	14	−3	20	Qualification for the relegation groups
9	Sporting Gijón B	18	3	7	8	16	24	−8	16	Qualification for the relegation groups
10	Covadonga	18	4	2	12	21	37	−16	14	Qualification for the relegation groups

Source: RFEF
Rules for classification: 1) points; 2) head-to-head points; 3) head-to-head goal difference; 4) goal difference; 5) number of goals scored
(C) Champions

=== Group 2 ===
Location of teams in 2020–21 Segunda División B – Group 2
Red: Subgroup A; Green: Subgroup B
Location of teams in 2020–21 Segunda División B – Group 2 (Basque Country)
Red: Subgroup A

==== Teams and locations ====
Team	Home city	Stadium	Capacity
Alavés B	Vitoria-Gasteiz	Ibaia	2,500
Amorebieta	Amorebieta-Etxano	Urritxe	3,000
Arenas	Getxo	Gobela	2,000
Athletic Bilbao B	Bilbao	Lezama	3,250
Barakaldo	Barakaldo	Lasesarre	7,960
Calahorra	Calahorra	La Planilla	4,500
Ebro	Zaragoza	El Carmen	3,000
Ejea	Ejea de los Caballeros	Luchán	1,200
Haro	Haro	El Mazo	4,300
Izarra	Estella-Lizarra	Merkatondoa	3,500
Laredo	Laredo	San Lorenzo	3,000
Leioa	Leioa	Sarriena	2,000
Mutilvera	Aranguren	Valle Aranguren	2,000
Osasuna B	Pamplona	Tajonar	4,500
Portugalete	Portugalete	La Florida	4,500
Racing Santander	Santander	El Sardinero	22,222
Real Sociedad B	San Sebastián	José Luis Orbegozo	2,500
Real Unión	Irun	Stadium Gal	5,000
SD Logroñés	Logroño	Estadio Mundial 82	1,275
Tarazona	Tarazona	Municipal de Tarazona	5,000
Tudelano	Tudela	Ciudad de Tudela	11,000

==== Subgroup 2A ====
Pos	Team	Pld	W	D	L	GF	GA	GD	Pts	Qualification
1	Real Sociedad B (C)	20	12	4	4	35	16	+19	40	Qualification for the promotion groups
2	Athletic Bilbao B	20	11	6	3	34	19	+15	39	Qualification for the promotion groups
3	Amorebieta	20	11	4	5	26	19	+7	37	Qualification for the promotion groups
4	Racing Santander	20	10	5	5	30	17	+13	35	Qualification for the Primera División RFEF promotion groups
5	Real Unión	20	10	3	7	26	18	+8	33	Qualification for the Primera División RFEF promotion groups
6	Arenas	20	5	11	4	15	15	0	26	Qualification for the Primera División RFEF promotion groups
7	Laredo	20	7	3	10	17	27	−10	24	Qualification for the Primera División RFEF promotion groups
8	Portugalete	20	6	4	10	16	19	−3	22	Qualification for the relegation groups
9	Alavés B	20	5	5	10	22	31	−9	20	Qualification for the relegation groups
10	Barakaldo	20	5	2	13	19	39	−20	17	Qualification for the relegation groups
11	Leioa	20	1	7	12	12	32	−20	10	Qualification for the relegation groups

Source: RFEF
Rules for classification: 1) points; 2) head-to-head points; 3) head-to-head goal difference; 4) goal difference; 5) number of goals scored
(C) Champions

==== Subgroup 2B ====
Pos	Team	Pld	W	D	L	GF	GA	GD	Pts	Qualification
1	Tudelano (C)	18	9	7	2	29	14	+15	34 (Note: Tudelano finished ahead of Calahorra on goal difference.)	Qualification for the promotion groups
2	Calahorra	18	9	7	2	17	6	+11	34	Qualification for the promotion groups
3	SD Logroñés	18	7	8	3	20	14	+6	29	Qualification for the promotion groups
4	Ebro	18	7	7	4	15	17	−2	28	Qualification for the Primera División RFEF promotion groups
5	Osasuna B	18	6	6	6	21	22	−1	24 (Note: Osasuna B is ahead of Tarazona on head-to-head goal difference: Tarazona-Osasuna B 1–0, Osasuna B-Tarazona 3–1.)	Qualification for the Primera División RFEF promotion groups
6	Tarazona	18	7	3	8	16	22	−6	24	Qualification for the Primera División RFEF promotion groups
7	Mutilvera	18	6	5	7	23	18	+5	23	Qualification for the relegation groups
8	Ejea	18	4	6	8	12	19	−7	18	Qualification for the relegation groups
9	Izarra	18	4	3	11	14	25	−11	15	Qualification for the relegation groups
10	Haro	18	2	6	10	14	24	−10	12	Qualification for the relegation groups

Source: RFEF
Rules for classification: 1) points; 2) head-to-head points; 3) head-to-head goal difference; 4) goal difference; 5) number of goals scored
(C) Champions

=== Group 3 ===
Location of teams in 2020–21 Segunda División B – Group 3
Red: Subgroup A; Green: Subgroup B
Location of teams in 2020–21 Segunda División B – Group 3 (Province of Barcelona)
Red: Subgroup A

==== Teams and locations ====
Team	Home city	Stadium	Capacity
Alcoyano	Alcoy	El Collao	4,850
Andorra	Encamp, Andorra	Prada de Moles	550
Atlético Levante	Valencia	Bunyol	3,000
Atzeneta	Atzeneta d'Albaida	El Regit	1,500
Badalona	Badalona	Municipal de Badalona	4,170
Barcelona B	Barcelona	Johan Cruyff	6,000
Cornellà	Cornellà de Llobregat	Nou Municipal de Cornellà	1,500
Espanyol B	Barcelona	Dani Jarque	1,520
Gimnàstic	Tarragona	Nou Estadi	14,591
Hércules	Alicante	José Rico Pérez	30,000
Ibiza	Ibiza	Can Misses	5,000
L'Hospitalet	L'Hospitalet de Llobregat	Municipal de L'Hospitalet	6,740
La Nucía	La Nucía	Camilo Cano	3,000
Llagostera	Llagostera	Municipal de Llagostera	1,500
Lleida Esportiu	Lleida	Camp d'Esports	13,500
Olot	Olot	Municipal d'Olot	5,000
Orihuela	Orihuela	Los Arcos	5,000
Peña Deportiva	Santa Eulària des Riu	Municipal de Santa Eulària	1,500
Prat	El Prat de Llobregat	Sagnier	1,500
Valencia Mestalla	Valencia	Antonio Puchades	3,000
Villarreal B	Villarreal	Mini Estadi	5,000

==== Subgroup 3A ====
Pos	Team	Pld	W	D	L	GF	GA	GD	Pts	Qualification
1	Gimnàstic (C)	20	9	8	3	32	25	+7	35	Qualification for the promotion groups
2	Barcelona B	20	10	4	6	28	17	+11	34	Qualification for the promotion groups
3	Andorra	20	8	7	5	23	19	+4	31	Qualification for the promotion groups
4	Llagostera	20	7	8	5	19	19	0	29	Qualification for the Primera División RFEF promotion groups
5	Cornellà	20	8	5	7	27	25	+2	29	Qualification for the Primera División RFEF promotion groups
6	Badalona	20	7	7	6	16	16	0	28	Qualification for the Primera División RFEF promotion groups
7	Lleida Esportiu	20	8	3	9	24	23	+1	27	Qualification for the Primera División RFEF promotion groups
8	Espanyol B	20	6	5	9	22	27	−5	23	Qualification for the relegation groups
9	L'Hospitalet	20	6	4	10	21	35	−14	22	Qualification for the relegation groups
10	Prat	20	4	9	7	13	20	−7	21	Qualification for the relegation groups
11	Olot	20	4	6	10	19	28	−9	18	Qualification for the relegation groups

Source: RFEF
Rules for classification: 1) points; 2) head-to-head points; 3) head-to-head goal difference; 4) goal difference; 5) number of goals scored
(C) Champions

==== Subgroup 3B ====
Pos	Team	Pld	W	D	L	GF	GA	GD	Pts	Qualification
1	Ibiza (C)	18	12	4	2	26	5	+21	40	Qualification for the promotion groups
2	Alcoyano	18	9	4	5	17	16	+1	31	Qualification for the promotion groups
3	Villarreal B	18	7	7	4	21	15	+6	28	Qualification for the promotion groups
4	Hércules	18	6	6	6	15	14	+1	24	Qualification for the Primera División RFEF promotion groups
5	La Nucía	18	6	5	7	15	19	−4	23	Qualification for the Primera División RFEF promotion groups
6	Atlético Levante	18	6	4	8	15	19	−4	22	Qualification for the Primera División RFEF promotion groups
7	Atzeneta	18	5	6	7	20	18	+2	21 (Note: Atzeneta finished ahead of Peña Deportiva on head-to-head points: Atzeneta-Peña Deportiva 1–1, Peña Deportiva-Atzeneta 0–2.)	Qualification for the relegation groups
8	Peña Deportiva	18	4	9	5	10	13	−3	21	Qualification for the relegation groups
9	Orihuela	18	3	6	9	12	26	−14	15 (Note: Orihuela finished ahead of Valencia Mestalla on head-to-head points: Orihuela-Valencia Mestalla 2–1, Valencia Mestalla-Orihuela 2–2.)	Qualification for the relegation groups
10	Valencia Mestalla	18	2	9	7	20	26	−6	15	Qualification for the relegation groups

Source: RFEF
Rules for classification: 1) points; 2) head-to-head points; 3) head-to-head goal difference; 4) goal difference; 5) number of goals scored
(C) Champions

=== Group 4 ===
Location of teams in 2020–21 Segunda División B – Group 4
Red: Subgroup A; Green: Subgroup B
Location of teams in 2020–21 Segunda División B – Group 4 (Canary Islands)
Red: Subgroup A

==== Teams and locations ====
Team	Home city	Stadium	Capacity
Algeciras	Algeciras	Nuevo Mirador	7,200
Atlético Sanluqueño	Sanlúcar de Barrameda	El Palmar	5,000
Betis Deportivo	Seville	Luis del Sol	1,300
Cádiz B	Cádiz	Ramón Blanco Rodríguez	2,500
Córdoba	Córdoba	El Arcángel	20,989
El Ejido	El Ejido	Santo Domingo	7,870
Las Palmas Atlético	Las Palmas de Gran Canaria	Anexo al Estadio Gran Canaria	2,000
Linares	Linares	Linarejos	10,000
Linense	La Línea de la Concepción	Municipal de La Línea	12,000
Lorca Deportiva	Lorca	Francisco Artés Carrasco	8,120
Marbella	Marbella	Municipal de Marbella	8,000
Marino	Los Cristianos, Arona	Antonio Domínguez Alfonso	7,500
Murcia	Murcia	Enrique Roca	31,179
Recreativo	Huelva	Nuevo Colombino	21,670
Recreativo Granada	Granada	Ciudad Deportiva	2,500
San Fernando	San Fernando	Iberoamericano	12,000
Sevilla Atlético	Seville	Jesús Navas	8,000
Tamaraceite	Las Palmas de Gran Canaria	Juan Guedes	1,100
UCAM Murcia	Murcia	La Condomina	6,000
Yeclano	Yecla	La Constitución	5,000

==== Subgroup 4A ====
Pos	Team	Pld	W	D	L	GF	GA	GD	Pts	Qualification
1	Algeciras (C)	18	9	5	4	21	17	+4	32	Qualification for the promotion groups
2	San Fernando	18	9	4	5	22	15	+7	31 (Note: San Fernando finished ahead of Atlético Sanluqueño on head-to-head points: Atlético Sanluqueño-San Fernando 1–3, San Fernando-Atlético Sanluqueño 2–0.)	Qualification for the promotion groups
3	Atlético Sanluqueño	18	9	4	5	18	17	+1	31	Qualification for the promotion groups
4	Linense	18	7	7	4	17	12	+5	28	Qualification for the Primera División RFEF promotion groups
5	Tamaraceite	18	6	9	3	19	15	+4	27	Qualification for the Primera División RFEF promotion groups
6	Cádiz B	18	6	5	7	20	19	+1	23	Qualification for the Primera División RFEF promotion groups
7	Las Palmas Atlético	18	4	9	5	13	16	−3	21	Qualification for the relegation groups
8	Recreativo	18	5	5	8	29	27	+2	20	Qualification for the relegation groups
9	Marbella	18	4	6	8	20	19	+1	18	Qualification for the relegation groups
10	Marino	18	2	4	12	11	33	−22	10	Qualification for the relegation groups

Source: RFEF
Rules for classification: 1) points; 2) head-to-head points; 3) head-to-head goal difference; 4) goal difference; 5) number of goals scored
(C) Champions

==== Subgroup 4B ====
Pos	Team	Pld	W	D	L	GF	GA	GD	Pts	Qualification
1	UCAM Murcia (C)	18	9	6	3	22	15	+7	33 (Note: UCAM Murcia finished ahead of Linares on goal difference.)	Qualification for the promotion groups
2	Linares	18	10	3	5	22	16	+6	33	Qualification for the promotion groups
3	Betis Deportivo	18	7	9	2	23	15	+8	30 (Note: Betis Deportivo finished ahead of Sevilla Atlético on head-to-head points: Betis Deportivo-Sevilla Atlético 3-0, Sevilla Atlético-Betis Deportivo 0–0.)	Qualification for the promotion groups
4	Sevilla Atlético	18	8	6	4	27	19	+8	30	Qualification for the Primera División RFEF promotion groups
5	Córdoba	18	7	6	5	21	16	+5	27	Qualification for the Primera División RFEF promotion groups
6	Murcia	18	6	7	5	22	21	+1	25	Qualification for the Primera División RFEF promotion groups
7	Recreativo Granada	18	6	5	7	20	19	+1	23	Qualification for the relegation groups
8	El Ejido	18	4	7	7	17	21	−4	19	Qualification for the relegation groups
9	Yeclano	18	2	5	11	13	27	−14	11	Qualification for the relegation groups
10	Lorca Deportiva	18	1	6	11	15	33	−18	9	Qualification for the relegation groups

Source: RFEF
Rules for classification: 1) points; 2) head-to-head points; 3) head-to-head goal difference; 4) goal difference; 5) number of goals scored
(C) Champions

=== Group 5 ===
Location of teams in 2020–21 Segunda División B – Group 5
Red: Subgroup A; Green: Subgroup B
Location of teams in 2020–21 Segunda División B – Group 5 (Community of Madrid)
Red: Subgroup A

==== Teams and locations ====
Team	Home city	Stadium	Capacity
Atlético Baleares	Palma	Estadi Balear	6,000
Atlético Madrid B	Madrid	Cerro del Espino	3,800
Badajoz	Badajoz	Nuevo Vivero	15,198
Don Benito	Don Benito	Vicente Sanz	3,500
Extremadura	Almendralejo	Ciudad de Almendralejo	11,580
Getafe B	Getafe	Ciudad Deportiva	1,500
Internacional	Boadilla del Monte	Polideportivo Municipal	1,200
Las Rozas	Las Rozas	Dehesa de Navalcarbón	3,000
Melilla	Melilla	Álvarez Claro	10,000
Mérida	Mérida	Estadio Romano	14,600
Navalcarnero	Navalcarnero	Mariano González	2,500
Poblense	Sa Pobla	Nou Camp	8,000
Rayo Majadahonda	Majadahonda	Cerro del Espino	3,800
Real Madrid Castilla	Madrid	Alfredo di Stéfano	6,000
San Sebastián de los Reyes	San Sebastián de los Reyes	Matapiñonera	3,000
Socuéllamos	Socuéllamos	Paquito Jiménez	2,500
Talavera de la Reina	Talavera de la Reina	El Prado	6,000
Villanovense	Villanueva de la Serena	Romero Cuerda	5,000
Villarrobledo	Villarrobledo	Nuestra Señora de la Caridad	5,500
Villarrubia	Villarrubia de los Ojos	Nuevo Municipal	1,000

==== Subgroup 5A ====
Pos	Team	Pld	W	D	L	GF	GA	GD	Pts	Qualification
1	San Sebastián de los Reyes (C)	18	10	5	3	22	14	+8	35	Qualification for the promotion groups
2	Real Madrid Castilla	18	9	5	4	30	21	+9	32	Qualification for the promotion groups
3	Internacional	18	8	6	4	24	16	+8	30	Qualification for the promotion groups
4	Rayo Majadahonda	18	8	4	6	17	16	+1	28	Qualification for the Primera División RFEF promotion groups
5	Atlético Baleares	18	6	6	6	26	21	+5	24	Qualification for the Primera División RFEF promotion groups
6	Navalcarnero	18	3	11	4	16	18	−2	20 (Note: Navalcarnero finished ahead of Las Rozas on head-to-head goal difference: Navalcarnero-Las Rozas 3-0, Las Rozas-Navalcarnero 3–1.)	Qualification for the Primera División RFEF promotion groups
7	Las Rozas	18	5	5	8	16	25	−9	20	Qualification for the relegation groups
8	Atlético Madrid B	18	4	7	7	15	20	−5	19	Qualification for the relegation groups
9	Poblense	18	2	10	6	16	21	−5	16	Qualification for the relegation groups
10	Getafe B	18	2	7	9	11	21	−10	13	Qualification for the relegation groups

Source: RFEF
Rules for classification: 1) points; 2) head-to-head points; 3) head-to-head goal difference; 4) goal difference; 5) number of goals scored
(C) Champions

==== Subgroup 5B ====
Pos	Team	Pld	W	D	L	GF	GA	GD	Pts	Qualification
1	Badajoz (C)	18	12	5	1	32	9	+23	41	Qualification for the promotion groups
2	Extremadura	18	8	7	3	24	16	+8	31	Qualification for the promotion groups
3	Talavera de la Reina	18	7	6	5	23	19	+4	27 (Note: Talavera de la Reina finished ahead of Villanovense on head-to-head points: Talavera de la Reina-Villanovense 1–0, Villanovense-Talavera de la Reina 0–0.)	Qualification for the promotion groups
4	Villanovense	18	7	6	5	15	8	+7	27	Qualification for the Primera División RFEF promotion groups
5	Don Benito	18	6	6	6	16	21	−5	24	Qualification for the Primera División RFEF promotion groups
6	Mérida	18	6	5	7	12	12	0	23 (Note: Mérida finished ahead of Melilla on goal difference.)	Qualification for the Primera División RFEF promotion groups
7	Melilla	18	6	5	7	15	19	−4	23	Qualification for the relegation groups
8	Villarrubia	18	4	8	6	17	24	−7	20	Qualification for the relegation groups
9	Socuéllamos	18	4	4	10	13	25	−12	16	Qualification for the relegation groups
10	Villarrobledo	18	2	4	12	15	29	−14	10	Qualification for the relegation groups

Source: RFEF
Rules for classification: 1) points; 2) head-to-head points; 3) head-to-head goal difference; 4) goal difference; 5) number of goals scored
(C) Champions

== Second phase ==
Each team from group A in the first phase played each group B team home and away.

=== Promotion groups (C) ===
==== Group 1C ====
Pos	Team	Pld	W	D	L	GF	GA	GD	Pts	Promotion or qualification
1	Burgos (O, P)	24	15	5	4	31	14	+17	50	Qualification for the promotion play-offs
2	Celta Vigo B	24	12	4	8	34	26	+8	40 (Note: Celta Vigo B finished ahead of Zamora on goal difference.)	Promotion to Primera División RFEF, eliminated in the promotion play-offs
3	Zamora	24	11	7	6	27	26	+1	40	Promotion to Primera División RFEF, eliminated in the promotion play-offs
4	Unionistas	24	11	6	7	24	17	+7	39 (Note: Unionistas finished ahead of Valladolid Promeseas on head-to-head goal difference: Unionistas +3, Valladolid –1.)	Promotion to Primera División RFEF
5	Valladolid Promesas	24	11	6	7	32	30	+2	39	Promotion to Primera División RFEF
6	Cultural Leonesa	24	9	7	8	34	28	+6	34	Promotion to Primera División RFEF

Source: BeSoccer
Rules for classification: 1) points; 2) head-to-head points; 3) head-to-head goal difference; 4) goal difference; 5) number of goals scored
(O) Play-off winners; (P) Promoted

==== Group 2C ====
Pos	Team	Pld	W	D	L	GF	GA	GD	Pts	PPG	Promotion or qualification
1	Real Sociedad B (O, P)	26	16	5	5	46	22	+24	53	2.04	Qualification for the promotion play-offs
2	Athletic Bilbao B	26	15	6	5	46	25	+21	51	1.96	Qualification for the promotion play-offs
3	Amorebieta (O, P)	26	14	7	5	34	21	+13	49	1.88	Qualification for the promotion play-offs
4	Calahorra	24	11	9	4	22	11	+11	42	1.75	Promotion to Primera División RFEF, eliminated in the promotion play-offs
5	Tudelano	24	9	7	8	35	31	+4	34 (Note: Tudelano finished ahead of SD Logroñés on goal difference.)	1.42	Promotion to Primera División RFEF
6	SD Logroñés	24	8	10	6	23	23	0	34	1.42	Promotion to Primera División RFEF

Source: BeSoccer
Rules for classification: 1) points per game; per RFEF: 2) points; 3) head-to-head points; 4) head-to-head goal difference; 5) goal difference; 6) number of goals scored
(O) Play-off winners; (P) Promoted

==== Group 3C ====
Pos	Team	Pld	W	D	L	GF	GA	GD	Pts	PPG	Promotion or qualification
1	Ibiza (O, P)	24	16	4	4	36	10	+26	52	2.17	Qualification for the promotion play-offs
2	Barcelona B	26	15	4	7	42	27	+15	49	1.88	Promotion to Primera División RFEF, eliminated in the promotion play-offs
3	Andorra	26	12	8	6	34	25	+9	44	1.69	Promotion to Primera División RFEF, eliminated in the promotion play-offs
4	Gimnàstic	26	11	10	5	38	24	+14	43	1.65	Promotion to Primera División RFEF
5	Alcoyano	24	9	6	9	22	25	−3	33	1.38	Promotion to Primera División RFEF
6	Villarreal B	24	7	8	9	31	32	−1	29	1.21	Promotion to Primera División RFEF

Source: BeSoccer
Rules for classification: 1) points per game; per RFEF: 2) points; 3) head-to-head points; 4) head-to-head goal difference; 5) goal difference; 6) number of goals scored
(O) Play-off winners; (P) Promoted

==== Group 4C ====
Pos	Team	Pld	W	D	L	GF	GA	GD	Pts	Promotion or qualification
1	Linares	24	14	5	5	28	17	+11	47	Promotion to Primera División RFEF, eliminated in the promotion play-offs
2	UCAM Murcia	24	12	7	5	31	23	+8	43	Promotion to Primera División RFEF, eliminated in the promotion play-offs
3	Algeciras	24	11	7	6	25	23	+2	40	Promotion to Primera División RFEF, eliminated in the promotion play-offs
4	Betis Deportivo	24	10	9	5	33	22	+11	39	Promotion to Primera División RFEF
5	San Fernando	24	11	5	8	29	23	+6	38	Promotion to Primera División RFEF
6	Atlético Sanluqueño	24	10	4	10	23	28	−5	34	Promotion to Primera División RFEF

Source: BeSoccer
Rules for classification: 1) points per game; per RFEF: 2) points; 3) head-to-head points; 4) head-to-head goal difference; 5) goal difference; 6) number of goals scored

==== Group 5C ====
Pos	Team	Pld	W	D	L	GF	GA	GD	Pts	Promotion or qualification
1	Badajoz	24	16	6	2	43	13	+30	54	Promotion to Primera División RFEF, eliminated in the promotion play-offs
2	San Sebastián de los Reyes	24	12	7	5	28	23	+5	43	Promotion to Primera División RFEF, eliminated in the promotion play-offs
3	Real Madrid Castilla	24	11	7	6	40	31	+9	40	Promotion to Primera División RFEF, eliminated in the promotion play-offs
4	Extremadura	24	10	9	5	28	21	+7	39	Promotion to Primera División RFEF
5	Internacional	24	10	6	8	27	22	+5	36	Promotion to Primera División RFEF
6	Talavera de la Reina	24	9	8	7	33	29	+4	35	Promotion to Primera División RFEF

Source: BeSoccer
Rules for classification: 1) points; 2) head-to-head points; 3) head-to-head goal difference; 4) goal difference; 5) number of goals scored

==== Ranking of fourth-place teams ====
Pos	Team	Pld	W	D	L	GF	GA	GD	Pts	PPG	Promotion
1	Calahorra	24	11	9	4	22	11	+11	42	1.75	Promotion to Primera División RFEF, eliminated in the promotion play-offs
2	Gimnàstic	26	11	10	5	38	24	+14	43	1.65	Promotion to Primera División RFEF
3	Betis Deportivo	24	10	9	5	33	22	+11	39	1.63	Promotion to Primera División RFEF
4	Extremadura	24	10	9	5	28	21	+7	39	1.63	Promotion to Primera División RFEF
5	Unionistas	24	11	6	7	24	17	+7	39	1.63	Promotion to Primera División RFEF

Source: BeSoccer
Rules for classification: 1) points per game; per RFEF: 2) points; 3) goal difference; 4) number of goals scored

=== Primera División RFEF promotion groups (D) ===
==== Group 1D ====
Pos	Team	Pld	W	D	L	GF	GA	GD	Pts	Promotion or qualification
1	Racing Ferrol (P)	24	11	7	6	31	23	+8	40	Promotion to Primera División RFEF
2	Deportivo La Coruña (P)	24	11	6	7	22	13	+9	39	Promotion to Primera División RFEF
3	Numancia	24	10	8	6	34	19	+15	38	Retention in Segunda División RFEF
4	Langreo	24	7	9	8	25	30	−5	30	Retention in Segunda División RFEF
5	Compostela	24	5	13	6	22	23	−1	28	Retention in Segunda División RFEF
6	Marino Luanco	24	7	6	11	19	26	−7	27	Retention in Segunda División RFEF

Source: BeSoccer
Rules for classification: 1) points; 2) head-to-head points; 3) head-to-head goal difference; 4) goal difference; 5) number of goals scored
(P) Promoted

==== Group 2D ====
Pos	Team	Pld	W	D	L	GF	GA	GD	Pts	Promotion or qualification
1	Real Unión (P)	26	14	3	9	34	21	+13	45	Promotion to Primera División RFEF
2	Racing Santander (P)	26	12	6	8	40	28	+12	42	Promotion to Primera División RFEF
3	Arenas	26	9	12	5	23	19	+4	39 (Note: Arenas finished ahead of Ebro on head-to-head points: Ebro-Arenas 0–2, Arenas-Ebro 0–0.)	Retention in Segunda División RFEF
4	Ebro	26	10	9	7	24	27	−3	39	Retention in Segunda División RFEF
5	Osasuna B	26	10	7	9	33	32	+1	37	Retention in Segunda División RFEF
6	Tarazona	26	9	4	13	22	33	−11	31	Retention in Segunda División RFEF
7	Laredo	26	8	5	13	23	36	−13	29	Retention in Segunda División RFEF

Source: BeSoccer
Rules for classification: 1) points; 2) head-to-head points; 3) head-to-head goal difference; 4) goal difference; 5) number of goals scored
(P) Promoted

==== Group 3D ====
Pos	Team	Pld	W	D	L	GF	GA	GD	Pts	Promotion or qualification
1	Cornellà (P)	26	12	6	8	36	29	+7	42	Promotion to Primera División RFEF
2	Llagostera (P)	26	10	9	7	27	26	+1	39	Promotion to Primera División RFEF
3	Hércules	26	10	8	8	28	23	+5	38	Retention in Segunda División RFEF
4	Lleida Esportiu	26	10	5	11	28	28	0	35	Retention in Segunda División RFEF
5	Badalona	26	8	9	9	23	23	0	33	Retention in Segunda División RFEF
6	La Nucía	26	8	7	11	20	28	−8	31	Retention in Segunda División RFEF
7	Atlético Levante	26	8	6	12	20	29	−9	30	Retention in Segunda División RFEF

Source: BeSoccer
Rules for classification: 1) points; 2) head-to-head points; 3) head-to-head goal difference; 4) goal difference; 5) number of goals scored
(P) Promoted

==== Group 4D ====
Pos	Team	Pld	W	D	L	GF	GA	GD	Pts	Promotion or qualification
1	Sevilla Atlético (P)	24	10	8	6	37	27	+10	38 (Note: Sevilla Atlético finished ahead of Linense on goal difference.)	Promotion to Primera División RFEF
2	Linense (P)	24	10	8	6	24	22	+2	38	Promotion to Primera División RFEF
3	Córdoba	24	10	7	7	31	22	+9	37	Retention in Segunda División RFEF
4	Murcia	24	9	8	7	27	25	+2	35	Retention in Segunda División RFEF
5	Tamaraceite	24	7	12	5	23	20	+3	33	Retention in Segunda División RFEF
6	Cádiz B	24	8	5	11	27	29	−2	29	Retention in Segunda División RFEF

Source: BeSoccer
Rules for classification: 1) points; 2) head-to-head points; 3) head-to-head goal difference; 4) goal difference; 5) number of goals scored
(P) Promoted

==== Group 5D ====
Pos	Team	Pld	W	D	L	GF	GA	GD	Pts	Promotion or qualification
1	Rayo Majadahonda (P)	24	12	5	7	26	21	+5	41	Promotion to Primera División RFEF
2	Atlético Baleares (P)	24	11	6	7	36	24	+12	39	Promotion to Primera División RFEF
3	Villanovense	24	10	6	8	21	14	+7	36	Retention in Segunda División RFEF
4	Mérida	24	8	6	10	19	19	0	30	Retention in Segunda División RFEF
5	Navalcarnero	24	5	12	7	20	25	−5	27	Retention in Segunda División RFEF
6	Don Benito	24	6	7	11	18	31	−13	25	Retention in Segunda División RFEF

Source: BeSoccer
Rules for classification: 1) points; 2) head-to-head points; 3) head-to-head goal difference; 4) goal difference; 5) number of goals scored
(P) Promoted

==== Ranking of second-placed teams for Copa del Rey qualification ====
Pos	Team	Pld	W	D	L	GF	GA	GD	Pts	PPG	Promotion
1	Atlético Baleares	24	11	6	7	36	24	+12	39	1.63	Qualification for the Copa del Rey
2	Deportivo La Coruña	24	11	6	7	22	13	+9	39	1.63	Qualification for the Copa del Rey
3	Racing Santander	26	12	6	8	40	28	+12	42	1.62	
4	Linense	24	10	8	6	24	22	+2	38	1.58	
5	Llagostera	26	10	9	7	27	26	+1	39	1.50	

Source: BeSoccer
Rules for classification: 1) points per game; per RFEF: 2) points; 3) goal difference; 4) number of goals scored

=== Segunda División RFEF relegation groups (E) ===
==== Group 1E ====
Pos	Team	Pld	W	D	L	GF	GA	GD	Pts	Qualification or relegation
1	Coruxo	26	10	6	10	32	32	0	36	Retention in Segunda Federación
2	Salamanca	26	9	8	9	29	26	+3	35	Retention in Segunda Federación
3	Pontevedra	26	8	10	8	31	25	+6	34	Retention in Segunda Federación
4	Oviedo B (R)	26	8	6	12	22	39	−17	30	Relegation to Tercera Federación
5	Lealtad (R)	26	5	13	8	20	23	−3	28	Relegation to Tercera Federación
6	Sporting Gijón B (R)	26	5	11	10	26	35	−9	26	Relegation to Tercera Federación
7	Guijuelo (R)	26	5	7	14	24	38	−14	22	Relegation to Tercera Federación
8	Covadonga (R)	26	4	3	19	31	57	−26	15	Relegation to Tercera Federación

Source: BeSoccer
Rules for classification: 1) points; 2) head-to-head points; 3) head-to-head goal difference; 4) goal difference; 5) number of goals scored
(R) Relegated

==== Group 2E ====
Pos	Team	Pld	W	D	L	GF	GA	GD	Pts	PPG	Qualification or relegation
1	Mutilvera	26	10	9	7	32	21	+11	39	1.50	Retention in Segunda División RFEF
2	Ejea	26	10	7	9	24	26	−2	37	1.42	Retention in Segunda División RFEF
3	Izarra	26	10	4	12	29	31	−2	34	1.31	Retention in Segunda División RFEF
4	Portugalete (R)	28	7	7	14	22	28	−6	28	1.00	Relegation to Tercera División RFEF
5	Haro (R)	26	5	10	11	25	31	−6	25	0.96	Relegation to Tercera División RFEF
6	Alavés B (R)	28	5	7	16	26	42	−16	22 (Note: Alavés B finished ahead of Barakaldo on goal difference.)	0.79	Relegation to Tercera División RFEF
7	Barakaldo (R)	28	5	7	16	26	51	−25	22	0.79	Relegation to Tercera División RFEF
8	Leioa (R)	28	3	7	18	18	47	−29	16	0.57	Relegation to Tercera División RFEF

Source: BeSoccer
Rules for classification: 1) points per game; per RFEF: 2) points; 3) head-to-head points; 4) head-to-head goal difference; 5) goal difference; 6) number of goals scored
(R) Relegated

==== Group 3E ====
Pos	Team	Pld	W	D	L	GF	GA	GD	Pts	PPG	Qualification or relegation
1	Peña Deportiva	26	8	12	6	20	20	0	36	1.38	Retention in Segunda División RFEF
2	Espanyol B	28	10	7	11	33	34	−1	37	1.32	Retention in Segunda División RFEF
3	Prat	28	8	12	8	23	27	−4	36	1.29	Retention in Segunda División RFEF
4	Olot (R)	28	9	7	12	29	35	−6	34	1.21	Relegation to Tercera División RFEF
5	Atzeneta (R)	26	7	7	12	27	29	−2	28	1.08	Relegation to Tercera División RFEF
6	L'Hospitalet (R)	28	8	6	14	31	48	−17	30	1.07	Relegation to Tercera División RFEF
7	Orihuela (R)	26	6	7	13	25	40	−15	25	0.96	Relegation to Tercera División RFEF
8	Valencia Mestalla (R)	26	2	12	12	24	35	−11	18	0.69	Relegation to Tercera División RFEF

Source: BeSoccer
Rules for classification: 1) points per game; per RFEF: 2) points; 3) head-to-head points; 4) head-to-head goal difference; 5) goal difference; 6) number of goals scored
(R) Relegated

==== Group 4E ====
Pos	Team	Pld	W	D	L	GF	GA	GD	Pts	Qualification or relegation
1	Las Palmas Atlético	26	8	11	7	27	25	+2	35 (Note: Las Palmas Atlético finished ahead of El Ejido and Recreativo Granada on head-to-head points: Las Palmas Atlético – 7 pts, El Ejido – 6 pts, Recreativo Granada – 4 pts.)	Retention in Segunda División RFEF
2	El Ejido	26	9	8	9	30	27	+3	35	Retention in Segunda División RFEF
3	Recreativo Granada	26	9	8	9	25	23	+2	35	Retention in Segunda División RFEF
4	Marbella (R)	26	9	7	10	31	27	+4	34	Relegation to Tercera División RFEF
5	Yeclano (R)	26	8	5	13	29	40	−11	29	Relegation to Tercera División RFEF
6	Recreativo (R)	26	6	5	15	36	38	−2	23	Relegation to Tercera División RFEF
7	Lorca Deportiva (R)	26	4	7	15	26	49	−23	19	Relegation to Tercera División RFEF
8	Marino (R)	26	2	6	18	18	50	−32	12	Relegation to Tercera División RFEF

Source: BeSoccer
Rules for classification: 1) points; 2) head-to-head points; 3) head-to-head goal difference; 4) goal difference; 5) number of goals scored
(R) Relegated

==== Group 5E ====
Pos	Team	Pld	W	D	L	GF	GA	GD	Pts	Qualification or relegation
1	Melilla	26	9	10	7	28	26	+2	37	Retention in Segunda División RFEF
2	Socuéllamos	26	9	6	11	20	27	−7	33	Retention in Segunda División RFEF
3	Poblense (R)	26	6	12	8	29	28	+1	30	Relegation to Tercera División RFEF
4	Atlético Madrid B (R)	26	7	8	11	23	30	−7	29 (Note: Atlético Madrid B finished ahead of Villarrubia on head-to-head points: Villarrubia-Atlético 0–2, Atlético-Villarrubia 2–2.)	Relegation to Tercera División RFEF
5	Villarrubia (R)	26	6	11	9	24	33	−9	29	Relegation to Tercera División RFEF
6	Las Rozas (R)	26	6	10	10	21	31	−10	28	Relegation to Tercera División RFEF
7	Getafe B (R)	26	4	11	11	18	30	−12	23	Relegation to Tercera División RFEF
8	Villarrobledo (R)	26	2	6	18	20	44	−24	12	Relegation to Tercera División RFEF

Source: BeSoccer
Rules for classification: 1) points; 2) head-to-head points; 3) head-to-head goal difference; 4) goal difference; 5) number of goals scored
(R) Relegated

==== Ranking of third-place teams ====
Pos	Team	Pld	W	D	L	GF	GA	GD	Pts	PPG	Qualification or relegation
1	Recreativo Granada	26	9	8	9	25	23	+2	35	1.35	Retention in Segunda División RFEF
2	Pontevedra	26	8	10	8	31	25	+6	34	1.31	Retention in Segunda División RFEF
3	Izarra	26	10	4	12	29	31	−2	34	1.31	Retention in Segunda División RFEF
4	Prat	28	8	12	8	23	27	−4	36	1.29	Retention in Segunda División RFEF
5	Poblense (R)	26	6	12	8	29	28	+1	30	1.15	Relegation to Tercera División RFEF

Source: BeSoccer
Rules for classification: 1) points per game; per RFEF: 2) points; 3) goal difference; 4) number of goals scored
(R) Relegated
