= Tato (footballer, born 1979) =

Spanish football manager (born 1979)

Personal information
- Full name: José Antonio García Escudero
- Date of birth: 16 February 1979 (age 47)
- Place of birth: Palma, Spain
- Height: 1.73 m (5 ft 8 in)
- Position: Defender

Youth career
- 1988–1996: Ferriolense

Senior career*
Years	Team	Apps	(Gls)
1996–2012	Ferriolense		

Managerial career
- 1996–2017: Ferriolense (youth)
- 2017–2018: Manacor
- 2018–2020: Ferriolense
- 2020–2023: Santanyí
- 2023: Atlético Baleares
- 2024: Ibiza (assistant)
- * Club domestic league appearances and goals

José Antonio García Escudero (born 16 February 1979), commonly known as Tato, is a Spanish retired footballer who played as a defender, and is a manager.

== Career ==
Born in Palma de Mallorca, Balearic Islands, Tato joined CD Ferriolense's youth setup at the age of nine. He featured with the first team for several seasons in Tercera División, retiring at the age of 33 in 2012.

Tato started his managerial career with his main club Ferriolense at the age of 17, being in charge of several youth sides until leaving in 2017. On 23 May of that year, he was appointed manager of CD Manacor in the fourth division.

On 17 May 2018, Tato returned to Ferriolense and was named in charge of the first team. On 13 May 2020, he joined the structure of CD Atlético Baleares, being appointed manager of farm team CE Santanyí.

On 15 February 2023, Tato replaced Onésimo Sánchez at the helm of ATB in Primera Federación. On 15 June, after narrowly avoiding relegation, he renewed his contract with the club for a further year, but was sacked on 25 September.

== Managerial statistics ==
As of match played 24 September 2023

Managerial record by team and tenure
Team	Nat	From	To	Record								Ref
Team	Nat	From	To	G	W	D	L	GF	GA	GD	Win %	Ref
Manacor	(Spain)	23 May 2017	17 May 2018	38	14	6	18	36	52	−16	36.84	
Ferriolense	(Spain)	17 May 2018	13 May 2020	67	18	22	27	64	96	−32	26.87	
Santanyí	(Spain)	13 May 2020	15 February 2023	87	50	14	23	130	85	+45	57.47	
Atlético Baleares	(Spain)	15 February 2023	25 September 2023	20	6	5	9	23	31	−8	30.00	
Total				212	88	47	77	253	264	−11	41.51	—
