= Julio Algar =

Spanish footballer (born 1969)

Personal information
- Full name: Julio Algar Pérez-Castilla
- Date of birth: 16 October 1969 (age 57)
- Place of birth: Madrid, Spain
- Height: 1.85 m (6 ft 1 in)
- Position: Right back

Youth career
- Real Madrid

Senior career*
| Years | Team | Apps | (Gls) |
| 1989–1992 | Real Madrid B | 76 | (1) |
| 1992–1993 | Villarreal | 25 | (0) |
| 1993–1997 | Córdoba | 146 | (12) |
| 1997–1998 | Lorca | 38 | (7) |
| 1998–2000 | Murcia | 67 | (4) |
| 2000–2001 | Cartagonova | 35 | (2) |
| 2001–2003 | Figueres | 70 | (10) |
| 2003–2004 | Mazarrón | | |
| 2004 | Molinense | | |
| Total | | 457 | (36) |

Managerial career
- 2004–2005: Molinense (youth)
- 2005–2007: Molinense
- 2007–2009: Ranero (youth)
- 2009–2010: Lorca Deportiva
- 2016: Horadada
- 2016: Lorca B
- 2016–2017: Lorca
- 2018: SS Reyes
- 2018–2019: Cultural Leonesa (youth)
- 2019: Murcia
- 2022: Granada B (interim)
- * Club domestic league appearances and goals

Julio Algar Pérez-Castilla (born 16 October 1969) is a Spanish retired footballer who played as a right back, and is a manager.

== Managerial statistics ==
As of 20 March 2022

Managerial record by team and tenure
| Team | Nat | From | To | Record | | | | | | | | Ref |
| Team | Nat | From | To | G | W | D | L | GF | GA | GD | Win % | Ref |
|---|---|---|---|---|---|---|---|---|---|---|---|---|
| Lorca Deportiva | (Spain) | 20 August 2009 | 24 May 2010 | 47 | 28 | 9 | 10 | 102 | 46 | +56 | 59.57 | |
| Horadada | (Spain) | 15 February 2016 | 3 June 2016 | 12 | 2 | 3 | 7 | 11 | 17 | −6 | 16.67 | |
| Lorca B | (Spain) | 3 June 2016 | 14 September 2016 | 4 | 3 | 1 | 0 | 9 | 2 | +7 | 75.00 | |
| Lorca | (Spain) | 14 September 2016 | 9 April 2017 | 29 | 17 | 7 | 5 | 41 | 28 | +13 | 58.62 | |
| SS Reyes | (Spain) | 25 January 2018 | 5 June 2018 | 16 | 5 | 6 | 5 | 20 | 21 | −1 | 31.25 | |
| Real Murcia | (Spain) | 18 March 2019 | 3 June 2019 | 9 | 3 | 2 | 4 | 7 | 8 | −1 | 33.33 | |
| Granada B (interim) | (Spain) | 7 March 2022 | 23 March 2022 | 2 | 0 | 0 | 2 | 0 | 4 | −4 | 0.00 | |
| Career total | | | | 119 | 58 | 28 | 33 | 190 | 126 | +64 | 48.74 | — |
