= La Unión CF =

Spanish football club

La Unión
- Full name: La Unión Club de Fútbol
- Founded: 2012
- Dissolved: 2019
- Ground: Municipal, La Unión, Murcia, Spain
- Capacity: 2,000
- 2018–19: Preferente Autonómica, 6th of 18
Home colours	Away colours

La Unión Club de Fútbol was a football team based in La Unión, in the Region of Murcia. The team last played in Preferente Autonómica, and held home matches at the Estadio Municipal de La Unión, with a capacity of 2,000 people.

== History ==
Founded in 2012, La Unión took FC Puente Tocinos' place in the Preferente Autonómica, after the club resigned to play in the division. They replaced dissolved CF La Unión, relegated from Segunda División B, and immediately achieved promotion to Tercera División, subsequently spending five seasons in the category until suffering relegation.

In 2018, the club hosted their matches in Cabezo de Torres, and merged with CA Cabezo de Torres in the following year, leaving their Preferente Autonómica spot to the club.

== Season to season ==
Season	Tier	Division	Place	Copa del Rey
2012–13	5	Pref. Aut.	2nd	
2013–14	4	3ª	5th	
2014–15	4	3ª	8th	
2015–16	4	3ª	6th	
2016–17	4	3ª	10th	
2017–18	4	3ª	18th	
2018–19	5	Pref. Aut.	6th	

- 5 season in Tercera División
