= Iván Forte =

Spanish footballer

Personal information
- Full name: Iván Forte Ortega
- Date of birth: 25 August 1988 (age 38)
- Place of birth: Elda, Spain
- Height: 1.70 m (5 ft 7 in)
- Position: Midfielder

Team information
- Current team: Rayo Ibense

Youth career
- Eldense
- 2005–2007: Alicante

Senior career*
Years	Team	Apps	(Gls)
2007–2009	Alicante B		
2008–2011	Alicante	61	(4)
2011–2012	Ontinyent	33	(1)
2012–2016	Racing Ferrol	120	(4)
2016–2018	Ebro	46	(0)
2018–2021	La Nucía	52	(1)
2021–2023	Eldense	40	(0)
2023–2024	Eldense B	1	(1)
2024–	Rayo Ibense	5	(0)
- * Club domestic league appearances and goals as of 12 October 2024

Iván Forte Ortega (born 25 August 1988) is a Spanish footballer who plays as a midfielder for Rayo Ibense.

== Club career ==
Born in Elda, Province of Alicante, Forte finished his youth career with local Alicante CF, and made his senior debuts with the reserves in the 2007–08 season. On 20 December 2008 he played his first game with the main squad, coming on as a second-half substitute in a 0–3 away loss against Real Zaragoza in the Segunda División championship; he appeared in a further five league games until the end of the campaign, which ended in relegation.

On 27 June 2011, after dropping another level with the Valencian, Forte joined Ontinyent CF in Segunda División B. On 7 July of the following year he signed with Racing de Ferrol in Tercera División, achieving promotion in his first season and contributing with 37 games and three goals to the feat.

After leaving Racing in 2016, Forte represented CD Ebro in the third level and helped CF La Nucía to achieve promotion to that category, before signing with CD Eldense in the fourth tier on 4 January 2021; he returned to the club he represented as a youth 15 years later. With the latter side, he achieved three consecutive promotions as they returned to the second division after a 59-year absence, but left on 7 July 2023.

On 13 September 2023, however, Forte returned to Eldense, but to play for the reserves in the Lliga Comunitat, sixth tier.
