= FC Puente Tocinos =

Puente Tocinos
- Full name: Fútbol Club Puente Tocinos
- Founded: 2005 as EFC Puente Tocinos
- Dissolved: 2012
- Ground: Municipal de Torresol, Puente Tocinos, Region of Murcia, Spain
- Capacity: 1,000
- Chairman: (Spain) José Antonio Sánchez
- Manager: (Spain) Víctor Basadre
- 2011–12: Preferente Autonómica, 7th of 18
Home colours	Away colours

Fútbol Club Puente Tocinos was a football team based in Puente Tocinos in the autonomous community of Region of Murcia. The team last played in Preferente Autonómica, and held home matches at the Municipal de Torresol, with a capacity of 1,000 seats.

Founded in 2005 as Escuela Fútbol Club Puente Tocinos, the club started to play as a senior in 2007, when they changed name to Fútbol Club Puente Tocinos. They achieved two consecutive promotions to reach Tercera División in 2009, spending two years in the division before suffering relegation. In July 2012, their spot in the Preferente Autonómica was acquired by newly-formed La Unión CF, after Puente Tocinos resigned to play in the category.

== Season to season ==
Season	Tier	Division	Place	Copa del Rey
2007–08	6	1ª Reg.	4th	
2008–09	5	Terr. Pref.	1st	
2009–10	4	3ª	11th	
2010–11	4	3ª	18th	
2011–12	5	Pref. Aut.	7th	

- 2 season in Tercera División
