= Estadio Nuevo Vivero =

Multi-use stadium in Badajoz, Spain

Coordinates: 38°51′32.12″N 7°00′21.19″W

Estadio Cívitas Nuevo Vivero
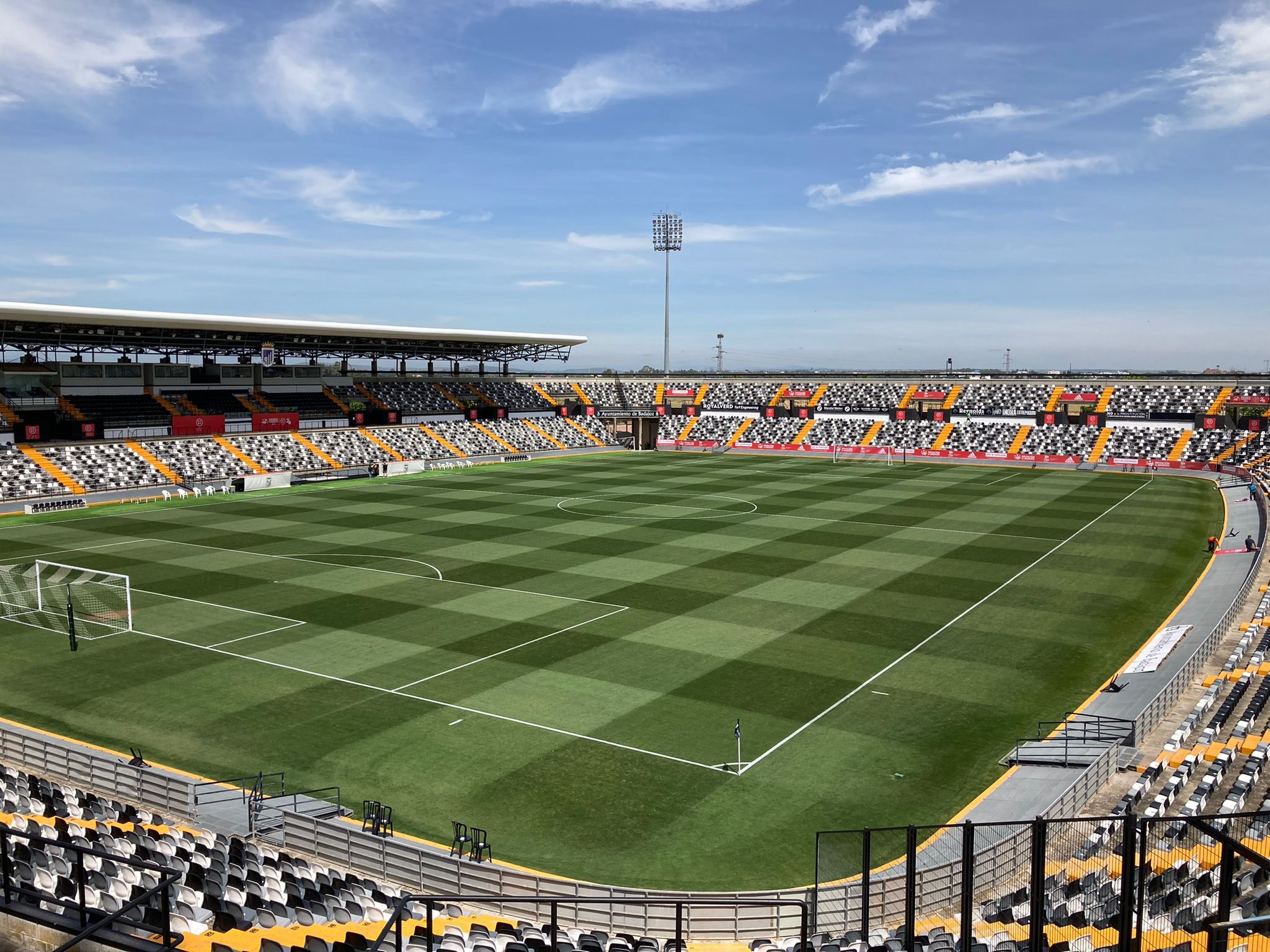
- Interactive map of Estadio Cívitas Nuevo Vivero
- Location: Badajoz, Extremadura, Spain
- Owner: Ayuntamiento de Badajoz
- Capacity: 14,898
- Surface: natural grass
- Record attendance: 14,898 (Badajoz v Granada; 29 January 2020)
- Field size: 105 x 68

Construction
- Opened: 1999
- Cost: 4.5 million €

Tenants
- CD Badajoz (1999–present); Spain national football team (selected matches)

Estadio Cívitas Nuevo Vivero is a multi-use stadium in Badajoz, Spain. It is currently used mostly for football matches and is the home ground of CD Badajoz. The stadium holds 14,175 and was built in 1999. They previously played at Estadio El Vivero, in the east part of the city, before moving a few kilometres south of the Guadiana, in 1999, to this purpose-built-arena. The stadium has hosted four full internationals for the Spain national team and one of the women's national team.

On 8 September 1999, Spain beat Cyprus 8–0 in a UEFA Euro 2000 qualification group match. Nearly seven years later, on 2 September 2006, Spain returned to the Estadio Nuevo Vivero and beat Liechtenstein in a qualification group match for the UEFA Euro 2008, 4–0.

On 1 December 2015, Spain beat Portugal in a qualification game for the UEFA Women's Euro 2017, 2–0.

On 5 September 2021, Spain beat Georgia 4–0 in a 2022 World Cup UEFA Group B match.

== Spain national football team matches ==
On 8 September 1999, Spain played their first international match at the Estadio Nuevo Vivero against Cyprus for the 2000 Euro qualification.

Nr	Competition	Date	Opponent	Result	Attendance	Scorers for Spain
1	2000 Euro qualification	8 September 1999	Cyprus	8–0	14,898	3x Ismael Urzaiz, 3x Julen Guerrero, César Martín, Fernando Hierro
2	2008 Euro qualification	2 September 2006	Liechtenstein	4–0	14,898	Fernando Torres, 2x David Villa, Luis García
3	2022 FIFA World Cup qualification	5 September 2021	Georgia	4–0	8,444	José Gayà, Carlos Soler, Ferran Torres, Pablo Sarabia
4	Friendly	5 June 2024	Andorra	5–0	13,000	Ayoze Pérez, 3x Mikel Oyarzabal, Ferran Torres
