= 2013 Tercera División play-offs =

Spanish football league play-offs

The 2013 Tercera División play-offs to Segunda División B from Tercera División (Promotion play-offs) were the final playoffs for the promotion from 2012–13 Tercera División to 2013–14 Segunda División B. The first four teams in each group (excluding reserve teams) took part in the play-off.

== Format ==
The eighteen group winners have the opportunity to be promoted directly to Segunda División B. The eighteen group winners were drawn into a two-legged series where the nine winners will promote to Segunda División B. The nine losing clubs will enter the play-off round for the last nine promotion spots.

The eighteen runners-up were drawn against one of the seventeen fourth-placed clubs outside their group and the eighteen third-placed clubs were drawn against one another in a two-legged series. The twenty-seven winners will advance with the nine losing clubs from the champions' series to determine the eighteen teams that will enter the last two-legged series for the last nine promotion spots. In all the playoff series, the lower-ranked club play at home first. Whenever there is a tie in position (e.g. like the group winners in the champions' series or the third-placed teams in the first round), a draw determines the club to play at home first.

== Group Winners promotion play-off ==
=== Qualified teams ===
The draw took place in the RFEF headquarters, in Las Rozas (Madrid), on 20 May 2013, 17:00 CEST.

Group	Team
1	Racing Ferrol
2	Tuilla
3	Tropezón
4	Laudio
5	Olot
6	Elche Ilicitano
7	Puerta Bonita
8	Burgos
9	El Palo

Group	Team
10	Algeciras
11	Santa Eulàlia
12	Las Palmas Atlético
13	La Hoya Lorca
14	Extremadura
15	San Juan
16	Haro
17	Sariñena
18	Toledo

=== Matches ===
Team 1	Agg.	Team 2	1st leg	2nd leg
Haro	0–2	Sariñena	0–1	0–1
El Palo	2–3	Burgos	0–0	2–3
Santa Eulàlia	4–4 (a)	La Hoya Lorca	3–3	1–1
Elche Ilicitano	3–2	Olot	1–0	2–2
Laudio	1–2	Racing Ferrol	1–1	0–1
Tuilla	1–4	Las Palmas Atlético	1–2	0–2
Tropezón	1–4	Algeciras	1–0	0–4
San Juan	0–1	Puerta Bonita	0–0	0–1
Extremadura	3–3 (a)	Toledo	3–3	0–0

The aggregate winners will be promoted to Segunda División B. The aggregate losers will advance to the Non-champions promotion play-off Second Round.

==== First leg ====
May 25	Laudio	1 – 1	Racing de Ferrol	Laudio/Llodio (Álava)
18:00 (CEST)	Bergara 84'	Report	Manu Barreiro 79'	Stadium: Estadio Ellakuri; Attendance: 2,500; Referee: Carlos Álvarez Fernández

May 25	El Palo	0 – 0	Burgos	Málaga
19:00 (CEST)		Report		Stadium: Campo de Fútbol San Ignacio; Attendance: 1,300; Referee: Bussian Mohand Mohand

May 26	Santa Eulàlia	3 – 3	La Hoya Lorca	Santa Eulària des Riu (Balearic Islands)
12:00 (CEST)	Piquero 52'; Malines 67'; R. Martínez 77'	Report	Armando 8'; Bienve 36'; Meca 62'	Stadium: Camp Municipal; Attendance: 1,500; Referee: Víctor Caballero León

May 26	Tuilla	1 – 2	Las Palmas Atlético	Tuilla (Asturias)
12:30 (CEST)	Esteban 71'	Report	Asdrúbal 51'; Héctor 90+2'	Stadium: Estadio El Candín; Attendance: 1,000; Referee: Sergio Espasandín Cores

May 26	San Juan	0 – 0	Puerta Bonita	Pamplona
16:30 (CEST)		Report		Stadium: Campo de Fútbol Municipal San Juan; Attendance: 750; Referee: Carlos Arriola Echevarria

May 26	Tropezón	1 – 0	Algeciras	Torrelavega (Cantabria)
17:00 (CEST)	Dorronsoro 69'	Report		Stadium: Campos del Malecón; Attendance: 2,080; Referee: César Ramos Domínguez

May 26	Haro	0 – 1	Sariñena	Haro (La Rioja)
18:00 (CEST)		Report	Samba 51'	Stadium: Estadio El Mazo; Attendance: 2,000; Referee: José Alberto Pardeiro Puente

May 26	Extremadura UD	3 – 3	Toledo	Almendralejo (Badajoz)
18:45 (CEST)	Curro 20', 37'; Copete 63'	Report	Rivera 25', 43'; Moriano 36' (o.g.)	Stadium: Francisco de la Hera; Attendance: 4,000; Referee: Antonio Jesús Pozo Ramos

May 26	Elche Ilicitano	1 – 0	Olot	Elche (Alicante)
19:10 (CEST)	Yeray 41' (pen.)	Report		Stadium: Manuel Martínez Valero; Attendance: 6,000; Referee: Guillermo Cuadra Fernández

==== Second leg ====
June 1	Racing de Ferrol	1 – 0 (2 – 1 agg.)	Laudio	Ferrol (A Coruña)
18:00 (CEST)	Marcos Álvarez 14'	Report		Stadium: Estadio de A Malata; Attendance: 8,000; Referee: Leandro Carbajales Gómez

June 1	Sariñena	1 – 0 (2 – 0 agg.)	Haro	Sariñena (Huesca)
18:00 (CEST)	Samba 86'	Report		Stadium: Estadio El Carmen; Attendance: 2,000; Referee: Israel Gómez Hernández

June 2	Puerta Bonita	1 – 0 (1 – 0 agg.)	San Juan	Madrid
11:30 (CEST)	Blanco 7'	Report		Stadium: Antiguo Canódromo; Attendance: 1,200; Referee: Christian Gadella Kamstra

June 2	La Hoya Lorca	1 – 1 (4 – 4 agg.)	Santa Eulàlia	Lorca (Region of Murcia)
12:00 (CEST)	Meca 90+3'	Report	Piquero 22'	Stadium: Francisco Artés Carrasco; Attendance: 5,000; Referee: Saúl Ais Reig

June 2	Las Palmas Atlético	2 – 0 (4 – 1 agg.)	Tuilla	Las Palmas de Gran Canaria
12:00 (CEST)	Asdrúbal 35'; Artiles 79'	Report		Stadium: Campo de Fútbol anexo Estadio Gran Canaria; Attendance: 3,500; Referee: Rubén Ávalos Barrera

June 2	Algeciras	4 – 0 (4 – 1 agg.)	Tropezón	Algeciras (Cádiz)
18:00 (CEST)	Berlanga 19'; Benítez 47'; Mario 75'; Pedro 87'	Report		Stadium: Estadio Nuevo Mirador; Attendance: 9,000; Referee: Salvador Alcaraz Yáñez

June 2	Olot	2 – 2 (2 – 3 agg.)	Elche Ilicitano	Olot (Girona)
18:00 (CEST)	Abel 59'; Uri 65'	Report	Yeray 9', 16'	Stadium: Estadi Municipal d'Olot; Attendance: 3,184; Referee: Juan Carlos Sánchez López

June 2	Burgos	3 – 2 (3 – 2 agg.)	El Palo	Burgos
18:30 (CEST)	Carralero 7'; José Ángel 55'; Arkaitz 75'	Report	Gerrit 46', 66'	Stadium: Estadio El Plantío; Attendance: 9,000; Referee: Aimar Velasco Arbaiza

June 2	Toledo	0 – 0 (3 – 3 agg.)	Extremadura	Toledo
19:30 (CEST)		Report		Stadium: Estadio Salto del Caballo; Attendance: 5,000; Referee: Antonio Muñoz García-Mascaraque

Promoted to Segunda División B
Racing de Ferrol (3 years later)	Sariñena (First time ever )	Puerta Bonita (First time ever)	La Hoya Lorca (First time ever)	Las Palmas Atlético (4 years later)	Algeciras (5 years later)	Elche Ilicitano (First time ever)	Burgos (1 year later)	Toledo (1 year later)

== Non-champions promotion play-off ==
=== First round ===
==== Qualified teams ====
The draw took place in the RFEF headquarters, in Las Rozas (Madrid), on 20 May 2013, 17:00 CEST.

Group	Position	Team
1	2nd	Celta B
2	2nd	Universidad Oviedo
3	2nd	Rayo Cantabria
4	2nd	Arenas Club
5	2nd	Cornellà
6	2nd	Novelda
7	2nd	Collado Villalba
8	2nd	Cultural Leonesa
9	2nd	Mancha Real
10	2nd	Córdoba B
11	2nd	Poblense
12	2nd	Granadilla
13	2nd	Cieza
14	2nd	UD Badajoz
15	2nd	Mutilvera
16	2nd	Alfaro
17	2nd	Andorra
18	2nd	Conquense

Group	Position	Team
1	3rd	Compostela
2	3rd	Covadonga
3	3rd	Cayón
4	3rd	Portugalete
5	3rd	Europa
6	3rd	Alzira
7	3rd	Trival Valderas
8	3rd	Arandina
9	3rd	Granada B
10	3rd	Coria
11	3rd	Formentera
12	3rd	Estrella
13	3rd	Mar Menor
14	3rd	Don Benito
15	3rd	Iruña
16	3rd	Calahorra
17	3rd	Ebro
18	3rd	Azuqueca

Group	Position	Team
1	4th	Deportivo B
2	4th	Langreo
3	4th	Laredo
4	4th	Leioa
5	4th	Manlleu
6	4th	Castellón
7	4th	Unión Adarve
8	4th	Gimnástica Segoviana
9	4th	Atlético Malagueño
10	4th	Mairena
11	4th	Alcúdia
12	4th	Unión Viera
13	4th	Jumilla
14	4th	Díter Zafra
15	4th	Cortes
16	4th	Varea
17	4th	Utebo
18	4th	Talavera

==== Matches ====
Team 1	Agg.	Team 2	1st leg	2nd leg
Leioa	2–4	Poblense	1–2	1–2
Mairena	1–1 (a)	Collado Villalba	0–0	1–1
Unión Adarve	2–0	Alfaro	1–0	1–0
Manlleu	1–3	Conquense	0–2	1–1
Jumilla	2–2 (3–2 p)	Andorra	1–1	1–1 (a.e.t.)
Varea	4–3	Novelda	1–2	3–1
Unión Viera	2–5	Cultural Leonesa	1–1	1–4
Gimnástica Segoviana	1–3	Granadilla	1–0	0–3
Utebo	3–2	Rayo Cantabria	1–1	2–1
Laredo	0–2	UD Badajoz	0–0	0–2
Díter Zafra	1–3	Mancha Real	1–1	0–2
Deportivo B	4–3	Cornellà	3–1	1–2
Talavera	0–1	Arenas Club	0–0	0–1
Langreo	1–2	Mutilvera	0–0	1–2
Alcúdia	2–2 (a)	Cieza	2–1	0–1
Atlético Malagueño	3–3 (a)	Universidad de Oviedo	2–2	1–1
Castellón	0–2	Córdoba B	0–0	0–2
Cortes	0–4	Celta B	0–2	0–2
Azuqueca	3–0	Iruña	3–0	0–0
Cayón	3–2	Formentera	1–1	2–1 (a.e.t.)
Compostela	6–2	Ebro	4–0	2–2
Trival Valderas	2–4	Granada B	1–1	1–3
Portugalete	3–4	Alzira	2–2	1–2
Estrella	2–3	Mar Menor	1–1	1–2
Coria	1–1 (a)	Calahorra	0–0	1–1
Covadonga	0–5	Don Benito	0–3	0–2
Europa	0–3	Arandina	0–1	0–2

The aggregate winners will advance to the Non-champions promotion play-off Second Round.

===== First leg =====
May 25	Alcúdia	2 – 1	Cieza	Alcúdia (Balearic Islands)
18:00 (CEST)	César 67'; D. Melero 73' (pen.)	Report	Cristian 15'	Stadium: Municipal de Alcúdia; Attendance: 400; Referee: Julio Mena Gimeno

May 25	Azuqueca	3 – 0	Iruña	Azuqueca de Henares (Guadalajara)
18:00 (CEST)	Izquierdo 28'; Esaú 60'; Kevin 72'	Report		Stadium: Complejo Deportivo San Miguel; Attendance: 600; Referee: Jerónimo Montes García-Navas

May 25	Compostela	4 – 0	Ebro	Santiago de Compostela (A Coruña)
18:00 (CEST)	Joselu 11', 49', 59'; M. Suárez 83'	Report		Stadium: Multiusos de San Lázaro; Attendance: 2,500; Referee: Victor Gijón Peñas

May 25	Laredo	0 – 0	UD Badajoz	Laredo (Cantabria)
18:00 (CEST)		Report		Stadium: Campo de San Lorenzo; Attendance: 1,300; Referee: Xavier Gómez Landazábal

May 25	Deportivo B	3 – 1	Cornellà	Abegondo (A Coruña)
19:00 (CEST)	L. Fernández 44', 61'; Romay 53'	Report	Enric 55'	Stadium: Ciudad Deportiva de Abegondo; Attendance: 3,000; Referee: Héctor Juan Bustos

May 26	Portugalete	2 – 2	Alzira	Portugalete (Bizkaia)
11:30 (CEST)	Jorge 49'; Vitoria 75'	Report	Mateos 13'; Verdú 30'	Stadium: Estadio La Florida; Attendance: 1,000; Referee: Igor Garcés Bargada

May 26	Trival Valderas	1 – 1	Granada B	Alcorcón (Community of Madrid)
11:30 (CEST)	Palacios 45'	Report	Sergio 4' (pen.)	Stadium: Campo de Fútbol La Canaleja; Attendance: 650; Referee: Borja Cuevas López

May 26	Unión Viera	1 – 1	Cultural Leonesa	Las Palmas de Gran Canaria
11:30 (CEST)	Dani Hedrera 72' (pen.)	Report	Santi Santos 55'	Stadium: Estadio Pepe Gonçalvez; Attendance: 500; Referee: Gabriel Flaquer Rey

May 26	Atlético Malagueño	2 – 2	Universidad de Oviedo	Málaga
12:00 (CEST)	Samu 27'; S. Darder 59'	Report	Kike 64'; Jabuto 67'	Stadium: Campo de Fútbol de la FMF; Attendance: 550; Referee: Dris Ahmed Amgait

May 26	Cayón	1 – 1	Formentera	Santa María de Cayón (Cantabria)
12:00 (CEST)	Briz 67'	Report	Winde 23'	Stadium: Campo Municipal Fernando Astobiza; Attendance: 1,500; Referee: Felipe Mata Areces

May 26	Coria	0 – 0	Calahorra	Coria del Río (Seville)
12:00 (CEST)		Report		Stadium: Estadio Guadalquivir; Attendance: 1,600; Referee: Víctor Manuel Pavón Guillén

May 26	Covadonga	0 – 3	Don Benito	Oviedo
12:00 (CEST)		Report	Golo 2'; Patri 61'; Toni 90+1'	Stadium: Campo de Fútbol J.A.A. Rabanal; Attendance: 1,100; Referee: Javier Toca Alonso

May 26	Leioa	1 – 2	Poblense	Leioa (Bizkaia)
12:00 (CEST)	Chus Seco 46'	Report	Busquets 19', 51'	Stadium: Campo de Fútbol de Sarriena; Attendance: 500; Referee: José Antonio López Conde

May 26	Mairena	0 – 0	Collado Villalba	Mairena del Alcor (Seville)
12:00 (CEST)		Report		Stadium: Estadio Nuevo San Bartolomé; Attendance: 1,000; Referee: José Manuel Fernández Fernández

May 26	Varea	1 – 2	Novelda	Varea (La Rioja)
12:00 (CEST)	Borja 37'	Report	Christian 28'; Chaco 74'	Stadium: Estadio Municipal; Attendance: 400; Referee: Roberto Flores Roda

May 26	Estrella	1 – 1	Mar Menor	Sardina del Sur (Las Palmas)
13:00 (CEST)	Ayoze 65'	Report	Aridane 34'	Stadium: Municipal de Las Palmitas; Attendance: 500; Referee: Manuel De los Santos Mellado

May 26	Unión Adarve	1 – 0	Alfaro	Madrid
16:30 (CEST)	Cavadas 75'	Report		Stadium: Campo de Fútbol Vereda de Ganapanes; Attendance: 1,000; Referee: Saúl Plaza García

May 26	Cortes	0 – 2	Celta B	Cortes (Navarre)
17:00 (CEST)		Report	Benja 75', 85'	Stadium: Campo de Fútbol San Francisco Javier; Attendance: 1,500; Referee: Antonio Miguel Blanco

May 26	Langreo	0 – 0	Mutilvera	Langreo (Asturias)
17:00 (CEST)		Report		Stadium: Estadio Ganzábal; Attendance: 1,500; Referee: Breogán Antón Martínez Vila

May 26	Manlleu	0 – 2	Conquense	Manlleu (Barcelona)
17:00 (CEST)		Report	A. Benítez 81', 84'	Stadium: Camp Municipal d'Esports; Attendance: 700; Referee: Mohamed N'Diaye

May 26	Utebo	1 – 1	Rayo Cantabria	Utebo (Zaragoza)
17:30 (CEST)	Loeffler 88'	Report	Kamaté 58'	Stadium: Campo de Fútbol Santa Ana; Attendance: 700; Referee: Pere Barceló Roca

May 26	Europa	0 – 1	Arandina	Barcelona
18:00 (CEST)		Report	Àlex Cano 11'	Stadium: Nou Sardenya; Attendance: 3,400; Referee: Daniel David Baiges Dones

May 26	Gimnástica Segoviana	1 – 0	Atlético Granadilla	Segovia
18:00 (CEST)	Mariano 75'	Report		Stadium: La Albuera; Attendance: 1,500; Referee: Mario López Fernández-Montes

May 26	Jumilla	1 – 1	Andorra	Lorca (Region of Murcia)
18:30 (CEST)	Carles 82'	Report	Barba 21'	Stadium: Campo Municipal La Hoya; Attendance: 800; Referee: Juan Manuel Ruiz Aguilera

May 26	Talavera	0 – 0	Arenas Club	Talavera de la Reina (Toledo)
18:30 (CEST)		Report		Stadium: Estadio El Prado; Attendance: 1,500; Referee: Borja Villa Maestre

May 26	Castellón	0 – 0	Córdoba B	Castellón de la Plana
19:00 (CEST)		Report		Stadium: Nou Estadi Castalia; Attendance: 7,000; Referee: Salvador Lax Franco

May 26	Díter Zafra	1 – 1	Mancha Real	Zafra (Badajoz)
19:00 (CEST)	Chema 50'	Report	Jonathan 34'	Stadium: Nuevo Estadio de Zafra; Attendance: 4,000; Referee: Pablo Burillo Naranjo

===== Second leg =====
June 1	Formentera	1 – 2 (a.e.t.) (2 – 3 agg.)	Cayón	Formentera (Balearic Islands)
17:00 (CEST)	Dennis 80' (pen.)	Report	Diego 11'; Briz 90+3'	Stadium: Estadio Municipal; Attendance: 800; Referee: David Congost Larrosa

June 1	UD Badajoz	2 – 0 (2 – 0 agg.)	Laredo	Badajoz
17:00 (CEST)	Rafa Gómez 37' (pen.); Álex Herrera 58'	Report		Stadium: Nuevo Vivero; Attendance: 900; Referee: Alberto Fuentes Fernández

June 1	Mutilvera	2 – 1 (2 – 1 agg.)	Langreo	Mutilva Baja (Navarre)
17:30 (CEST)	Íñigo Gil 15'; Albisu 46'	Report	Carly 38'	Stadium: Polideportivo Valle de Aranguren; Attendance: 1,000; Referee: Javier Merino Sánchez

June 1	Andorra	1 – 1 (a.e.t.) (2 – 2 agg.) (2 – 3 p)	Jumilla	Andorra (Teruel)
18:00 (CEST)	Adán 56'	Report	Terol 46'	Stadium: Estadio Juan Antonio Endeiza; Attendance: 800; Referee: Jesús Nieva López
	Penalties
	Teto (penalty scored); Vidal (penalty missed); Revilla (penalty missed); Adán (penalty missed); Javi Moreno (penalty scored); Laguarta (penalty missed)		(penalty missed) Javi Bernal; (penalty scored) Poveda; (penalty missed) Carles; (penalty missed) Nacho; (penalty scored) Jonás; (penalty scored) C. Méndez

June 1	Arandina	2 – 0 (3 – 0 agg.)	Europa	Aranda de Duero (Burgos)
18:00 (CEST)	Niche 7'; Gustavo 38'	Report		Stadium: Estadio El Montecillo; Attendance: 1,700; Referee: Francisco Javier Acedo Martínez

June 1	Ebro	2 – 2 (2 – 6 agg.)	Compostela	Zaragoza
18:00 (CEST)	Arribas 9'; Bressel 53'	Report	Joselu 37', 76'	Stadium: Campo Municipal de Fútbol La Almozara; Attendance: 700; Referee: Jorge Campos Goeloe

June 1	Arenas Club	1 – 0 (1 – 0 agg.)	Talavera	Getxo (Bizkaia)
18:30 (CEST)	Murci 15'	Report		Stadium: Estadio Nuevo Gobela; Attendance: 1,000; Referee: José María Munilla Prades

June 1	Córdoba B	2 – 0 (2 – 0 agg.)	Castellón	Córdoba
18:30 (CEST)	Seoane 101' (pen.); Guti 123'	Report		Stadium: Estadio Nuevo Arcángel; Attendance: 5,940; Referee: José Manuel Pardo Martínez

June 1	Poblense	2 – 1 (4 – 2 agg.)	Leioa	Sa Pobla (Balearic Islands)
19:30 (CEST)	Busquets 62', 87'	Report	Barrasa 67'	Stadium: Nou Camp de Sa Pobla; Attendance: 500; Referee: Iván Caparrós Hernández

June 1	Novelda	1 – 3 (3 – 4 agg.)	Varea	Novelda (Alicante)
20:00 (CEST)	Inarejos 69'	Report	Borja 27'; Maño 60'; Rubén Pérez 67'	Stadium: Estadio La Magdalena; Attendance: 1,000; Referee: Santiago Cecilia Illán

June 2	Collado Villalba	1 – 1 (1 – 1 agg.)	Mairena	Collado Villalba (Community of Madrid)
11:45 (CEST)	Olmedo 72'	Report	Vega 75' (pen.)	Stadium: Ciudad Deportiva; Attendance: 700; Referee: Alexis Carlos Pulido Santana

June 2	Calahorra	1 – 1 (1 – 1 agg.)	Coria	Calahorra (La Rioja)
12:00 (CEST)	Jorge 27'	Report	Picuchos 21' (o.g.)	Stadium: Estadio La Planilla; Attendance: 1,300; Referee: Israel León Lavín

June 2	Celta B	2 – 0 (4 – 0 agg.)	Cortes	Vigo (Pontevedra)
12:00 (CEST)	Rubén Martínez 80'; Félix 90+2'	Report		Stadium: Municipal de Barreiro; Attendance: 800; Referee: Oliver De la Fuente Ramos

June 2	Cieza	1 – 0 (2 – 2 agg.)	Alcúdia	Cieza (Region of Murcia)
12:00 (CEST)	Cristian 62'	Report		Stadium: Campo Municipal de Fútbol La Arboleja; Attendance: 2,000; Referee: Álvaro Masero Vesga

June 2	Cultural Leonesa	4 – 1 (5 – 2 agg.)	Unión Viera	León
12:00 (CEST)	Mario Villar 40'; Santi Santos 64'; Álvaro 67', 80'	Report	Néstor 88'	Stadium: Reino de León; Attendance: 3,000; Referee: Arturo Díaz Álvarez

June 2	Granada B	3 – 1 (4 – 2 agg.)	Trival Valderas	Granada
12:00 (CEST)	Pedro 10'; Nico 60'; Herlein 90+6'	Report	Julio 79'	Stadium: Estadio Nuevo Los Cármenes; Attendance: 5,000; Referee: Samuel de Haro Tirado

June 2	Mar Menor	2 – 1 (3 – 2 agg.)	Estrella	San Javier (Region of Murcia)
12:00 (CEST)	Emilio Rodríguez 38' (pen.); Aridane 68'	Report	Bermúdez 45'	Stadium: Estadio Pitín; Attendance: 1,000; Referee: Antonio Artacho Cobo

June 2	Universidad de Oviedo	1 – 1 (3 – 3 agg.)	Atlético Malagueño	Oviedo
12:00 (CEST)	Otero 41' (pen.)	Report	Guerra 46' (pen.)	Stadium: Estadio Universitario San Gregorio; Attendance: 800; Referee: Pablo Brea Peón

June 2	Atlético Granadilla	3 – 0 (3 – 1 agg.)	Gimnástica Segoviana	Granadilla de Abona (Tenerife)
13:00 (CEST)	Noah 11'; Airam 59'; Roberto Carlos 84'	Report		Stadium: Campo de Fútbol Francisco Suárez; Attendance: 1,000; Referee: Juan Peña Varela

June 2	Iruña	0 – 0 (0 – 3 agg.)	Azuqueca	Pamplona
17:00 (CEST)		Report		Stadium: Campo de Fútbol Municipal Orkoien; Attendance: 1,200; Referee: Diego Acero Pradera

June 2	Alfaro	0 – 1 (0 – 2 agg.)	Unión Adarve	Alfaro (La Rioja)
18:00 (CEST)		Report	Xavi 90+4'	Stadium: Estadio La Molineta; Attendance: 900; Referee: Alejandro Sánchez Alba

June 2	Rayo Cantabria	1 – 2 (2 – 3 agg.)	Utebo	San Román de la Llanilla (Cantabria)
18:00 (CEST)	Rocha 74'	Report	Loeffler 35'; Pulga 85'	Stadium: Campo de Fútbol de San Román; Attendance: 600; Referee: Alejandro Granda Barros

June 2	Conquense	1 – 1 (3 – 1 agg.)	Manlleu	Cuenca
18:30 (CEST)	Manzano 64'	Report	Ginés 39'	Stadium: Estadio La Fuensanta; Attendance: 1,200; Referee: Eduardo Moya Baena

June 2	Alzira	2 – 1 (4 – 3 agg.)	Portugalete	Alzira (Valencia)
19:00 (CEST)	William 61'; Onrubia 79'	Report	Mario 86'	Stadium: Estadio Luis Suñer Picó; Attendance: 1,500; Referee: Juan Antonio Campos Salinas

June 2	Don Benito	2 – 0 (5 – 0 agg.)	Covadonga	Don Benito (Badajoz)
19:00 (CEST)	Javi Ramos 29'; Tiago 51'	Report		Stadium: Estadio Vicente Sanz; Attendance: 1,400; Referee: Ramón Serrano Sánchez

June 2	Mancha Real	2 – 0 (3 – 1 agg.)	Díter Zafra	Mancha Real (Jaén)
19:00 (CEST)	Santi López 43'; Miguel Ruiz 82'	Report		Stadium: Estadio Polideportivo de La Juventud; Attendance: 1,800; Referee: Javier Alberola Rojas

June 2	Cornellà	2 – 1 (3 – 4 agg.)	Deportivo B	Cornellà de Llobregat (Barcelona)
19:30 (CEST)	Boris 38'; Dani Martí 42'	Report	Luis Fernández 59'	Stadium: Estadi Municipal de Cornellà; Attendance: 3,184; Referee: Raúl Martín González Francés

=== Second round ===
==== Qualified teams ====
The draw was held in the RFEF headquarters, in Las Rozas (Madrid), on 3 June 2013, 17:30 CEST.

Group	Position	Team	Notes
2	1st	Tuilla	Group Winners promotion play-off losers
3	1st	Tropezón	Group Winners promotion play-off losers
4	1st	Laudio	Group Winners promotion play-off losers
5	1st	Olot	Group Winners promotion play-off losers
9	1st	El Palo	Group Winners promotion play-off losers
11	1st	Santa Eulàlia	Group Winners promotion play-off losers
14	1st	Extremadura	Group Winners promotion play-off losers
15	1st	San Juan	Group Winners promotion play-off losers
18	1st	Haro	Group Winners promotion play-off losers

Group	Position	Team
1	2nd	Celta B
2	2nd	Universidad de Oviedo
4	2nd	Arenas Club
8	2nd	Cultural Leonesa
9	2nd	Mancha Real
10	2nd	Córdoba B
11	2nd	Poblense
12	2nd	Granadilla
13	2nd	Cieza
14	2nd	UD Badajoz
15	2nd	Mutilvera
18	2nd	Conquense

Group	Position	Team
1	3rd	Compostela
3	3rd	Cayón
6	3rd	Alzira
8	3rd	Arandina
9	3rd	Granada B
10	3rd	Coria
13	3rd	Mar Menor
14	3rd	Don Benito
18	3rd	Azuqueca

Group	Position	Team
1	4th	Deportivo B
7	4th	Unión Adarve
10	4th	Mairena
13	4th	Jumilla
16	4th	Varea
17	4th	Utebo

==== Matches ====
Team 1	Agg.	Team 2	1st leg	2nd leg
Unión Adarve	1–2	Tropezón	0–0	1–2
Deportivo B	3–2	Tuilla	2–0	1–2
Varea	1–3	Laudio	0–2	1–1
Utebo	2–3	Extremadura	1–1	1–2
Mairena	2–5	Olot	1–1	1–4
Jumilla	2–7	El Palo	1–2	1–5
Mar Menor	4–3	Haro	1–2	3–1 (a.e.t.)
Compostela	4–1	San Juan	3–0	1–1
Arandina	5–4	Santa Eulàlia	2–1	3–3
Azuqueca	3–5	Cieza	3–1	0–4
Don Benito	0–1	Conquense	0–0	0–1
Coria	2–2 (a)	Poblense	2–1	0–1
Granada B	2–2 (a)	Córdoba B	1–0	1–2
Cayón	1–2	Arenas Club	0–1	1–1
Alzira	1–1 (4–3 p)	UD Badajoz	1–0	0–1 (a.e.t.)
Cultural Leonesa	2–2 (a)	Mancha Real	1–0	1–2
Granadilla	2–4	Universidad de Oviedo	1–0	1–4
Celta B	4–2	Mutilvera	2–0	2–2

The aggregate winners will advance to the Non-champions promotion play-off Third Round.

===== First leg =====
June 8	Azuqueca	3 – 1	Cieza	Azuqueca de Henares (Guadalajara)
18:30 (CEST)	Pancorbo 42'; Izquierdo 57', 68'	Report	Chema 80'	Stadium: Complejo Deportivo San Miguel; Attendance: 1,000; Referee: Pedro Eugenio Muñoz Piedra

June 8	Mairena	1 – 1	Olot	Mairena del Alcor (Seville)
19:00 (CEST)	Gabri 39'	Report	Carlos 60'	Stadium: Estadio Nuevo San Bartolomé; Attendance: 1,200; Referee: Juan Diego Bote González

June 8	Coria	2 – 1	Poblense	Coria del Río (Seville)
19:30 (CEST)	Israel 12'; Feito 80' (pen.)	Report	Busquets 89' (pen.)	Stadium: Estadio Guadalquivir; Attendance: 1,800; Referee: Jorge López Santos

June 9	Arandina	2 – 1	Santa Eulàlia	Aranda de Duero (Burgos)
12:00 (CEST)	Ayrton 59'; Gustavo 70'	Report	Piquero 82'	Stadium: Estadio El Montecillo; Attendance: 1,900; Referee: Ibai Rezola Etxeberría

June 9	Granadilla	1 – 0	Universidad de Oviedo	Granadilla de Abona (Tenerife)
12:00 (CEST)	Iván Martín 90+1'	Report		Stadium: Campo de Fútbol Francisco Suárez; Attendance: 1,000; Referee: Fernando Bueno Prieto

June 9	Mar Menor	1 – 2	Haro	San Javier (Region of Murcia)
12:00 (CEST)	Emilio 45'	Report	Alberto 2'; Tato 15'	Stadium: Estadio Pitín; Attendance: 1,200; Referee: Miguel García Aceña

June 9	Varea	0 – 2	Laudio	Varea (La Rioja)
12:00 (CEST)		Report	Galder 14'; Asier 44' (o.g.)	Stadium: Estadio Municipal; Attendance: 700; Referee: Miguel Ángel Vila Sánchez

June 9	Unión Adarve	0 – 0	Tropezón	Madrid
16:30 (CEST)		Report		Stadium: Campo de Fútbol Vereda de Ganapanes; Attendance: 700; Referee: Luis de Oleza de España

June 9	Utebo	1 – 1	Extremadura	Utebo (Zaragoza)
17:30 (CEST)	Roldán 75'	Report	Juanito de la Cruz 33'	Stadium: Campo de Fútbol Santa Ana; Attendance: 600; Referee: Vicente Alexander Muñoz Baquero

June 9	Cayón	0 – 1	Arenas Club	Santa María de Cayón (Cantabria)
18:00 (CEST)		Report	Zumalakarregi 4'	Stadium: Campo Municipal Fernando Astobiza; Attendance: 2,000; Referee: Francisco Rivera García

June 9	Celta B	2 – 0	Mutilvera	Vigo (Pontevedra)
18:00 (CEST)	Aitor 64'; Añón 88'	Report		Stadium: Municipal de Barreiro; Attendance: 1,500; Referee: César Ramos Domínguez

June 9	Compostela	3 – 0	San Juan	Santiago de Compostela (A Coruña)
18:00 (CEST)	Gonzalo 52'; Alustiza 68' (o.g.); Joselu 74'	Report		Stadium: Multiusos de San Lázaro; Attendance: 3,500; Referee: Luis José López Abelleira

June 9	Cultural Leonesa	1 – 0	Mancha Real	León
18:00 (CEST)	Gonzalo 65'	Report		Stadium: Estadio Reino de León; Attendance: 3,500; Referee: David Iglesias Gutiérrez

June 9	Deportivo B	2 – 0	Tuilla	Abegondo (A Coruña)
18:00 (CEST)	Lemos 51'; Víctor 53'	Report		Stadium: Ciudad Deportiva de Abegondo; Attendance: 3,500; Referee: David Rivera García

June 9	Jumilla	1 – 2	El Palo	Lorca (Region of Murcia)
18:30 (CEST)	Cantarutti 64'	Report	Ibón Arrieta 19'; Jesule 26'	Stadium: Campo Municipal La Hoya; Attendance: 1,000; Referee: Fernando Navarro Collado

June 9	Alzira	1 – 0	UD Badajoz	Alzira (Valencia)
19:00 (CEST)	Verdú 57'	Report		Stadium: Estadio Luis Suñer Picó; Attendance: 1,700; Referee: Luis Alberto Marchante Flores

June 9	Don Benito	0 – 0	Conquense	Don Benito (Badajoz)
20:00 (CEST)		Report		Stadium: Estadio Vicente Sanz; Attendance: 1,500; Referee: Alberto González Hernández

June 10	Granada B	1 – 0	Córdoba B	Granada
20:30 (CEST)	Sergio Martín 32'	Report		Stadium: Estadio Nuevo Los Cármenes; Attendance: 7,500; Referee: José Romero Pérez

===== Second leg =====
June 15	Laudio	1 – 1 (3 – 1 agg.)	Varea	Laudio/Llodio (Álava)
18:00 (CEST)	Tyson 90+2'	Report	Efrén 69'	Stadium: Estadio Ellakuri; Attendance: 700; Referee: Eusebio Sáez García

June 15	San Juan	1 – 1 (1 – 4 agg.)	Compostela	Pamplona
18:00 (CEST)	de Esteban 37'	Report	Marcos Suárez 35'	Stadium: Campo de Fútbol Municipal San Juan; Attendance: 1,000; Referee: Héctor García Fernández

June 15	Arenas Club	1 – 1 (2 – 1 agg.)	Cayón	Getxo (Bizkaia)
18:30 (CEST)	Rober 83'	Report	Óscar 23'	Stadium: Estadio Nuevo Gobela; Attendance: 1,200; Referee: David Moreno Pardo

June 15	El Palo	5 – 1 (7 – 2 agg.)	Jumilla	Málaga
19:00 (CEST)	Ismael 6'; Igna 13'; Durán 30', 69'; Julio 72'	Report	Nacho 90+3'	Stadium: Campo de Fútbol San Ignacio; Attendance: 800; Referee: Agustín Sánchez Salcedo

June 15	Olot	4 – 1 (5 – 2 agg.)	Mairena	Olot (Girona)
19:00 (CEST)	Carlos 9'; Raúl Rodríguez 17'; Francolí 42'; Uri Santos 57'	Report	Gabri 60'	Stadium: Estadi Municipal d'Olot; Attendance: 2,212; Referee: Alfonso Carballal Vallés

June 15	Poblense	1 – 0 (2 – 2 agg.)	Coria	Sa Pobla (Balearic Islands)
19:30 (CEST)	Vidal 15'	Report		Stadium: Nou Camp de Sa Pobla; Attendance: 4,000; Referee: Jaime Moltó Egea

June 15	Mancha Real	2 – 1 (2 – 2 agg.)	Cultural Leonesa	Mancha Real (Jaén)
20:00 (CEST)	Enma 47'; Jonathan Rivera 83'	Report	Raúl Torres 77'	Stadium: Estadio Polideportivo de La Juventud; Attendance: 2,000; Referee: José Antonio Campos García

June 16	Universidad de Oviedo	4 – 1 (4 – 2 agg.)	Granadilla	Oviedo
12:00 (CEST)	Vari 32'; Otero 47', 79' (pen.); Jony 83'	Report	Juanmi 87'	Stadium: Estadio Universitario San Gregorio; Attendance: 300; Referee: Rubén Comesaña Bastero

June 16	Conquense	1 – 0 (1 – 0 agg.)	Don Benito	Cuenca
18:00 (CEST)	Manzano 57'	Report		Stadium: Estadio La Fuensanta; Attendance: 2,000; Referee: Enrique Arias Fernández

June 16	Mutilvera	2 – 2 (2 – 4 agg.)	Celta B	Mutilva Baja (Navarre)
18:00 (CEST)	Marco 24'; Txitxo 48'	Report	Camochu 13'; Thaylor 80'	Stadium: Polideportivo Valle de Aranguren; Attendance: 1,000; Referee: Iñaki Sáez de Adana Oribe

June 16	Tropezón	2 – 1 (2 – 1 agg.)	Unión Adarve	Tanos (Cantabria)
18:00 (CEST)	Perujo 39'; Edu 90'	Report	Gianni 6'	Stadium: Campo de Fútbol Municipal Santa Ana; Attendance: 1,600; Referee: Jon Egilegor Iragorri

June 16	Tuilla	2 – 1 (2 – 3 agg.)	Deportivo B	Tuilla (Asturias)
18:00 (CEST)	Leiras 44'; Mini 79'	Report	Víctor 77'	Stadium: Estadio El Candín; Attendance: 800; Referee: Fernando Martín Pérez

June 16	UD Badajoz	1 – 0 (a.e.t.) (1 – 1 agg.) (3 – 4 p)	Alzira	Badajoz
18:00 (CEST)	Álex Herrera 22'	Report		Stadium: Nuevo Vivero; Attendance: 1,000; Referee: Javier Gil Racionero
	Penalties
	Álex Berjano (penalty missed); Parri (penalty scored); Rafa Gómez (penalty scored); Álex Herrera (penalty scored); Javi Chino (penalty missed)		(penalty scored) Verdú; (penalty missed) Mateos; (penalty scored) Prats; (penalty scored) Ortega; (penalty scored) Gisbert

June 16	Cieza	4 – 0 (5 – 3 agg.)	Azuqueca	Cieza (Region of Murcia)
19:00 (CEST)	Salmerón 14' (pen.), 36' (pen.); Ismael 59'; Manolo Mas 90+1'	Report		Stadium: Campo Municipal de Fútbol La Arboleja; Attendance: 3,500; Referee: Cristobal Jesús Montoro Garrido

June 16	Córdoba B	2 – 1 (2 – 2 agg.)	Granada B	Córdoba
19:00 (CEST)	Juan Guerra 41'; Javi López 83'	Report	Sergio Martín 60'	Stadium: Estadio Nuevo Arcángel; Attendance: 10,000; Referee: Antonio Aparicio Álvarez

June 16	Extremadura	2 – 1 (3 – 2 agg.)	Utebo	Almendralejo (Badajoz)
19:00 (CEST)	Nando Copete 3'; Ruiz 44'	Report	Íñigo 56'	Stadium: Francisco de la Hera; Attendance: 6,500; Referee: Juan Manuel Muñoz Méndez

June 16	Haro	1 – 3 (a.e.t.) (3 – 4 agg.)	Mar Menor	Haro (La Rioja)
19:00 (CEST)	Pirri 89'	Report	Emilio Rodríguez 7', 56'; Álvaro 100'	Stadium: Estadio El Mazo; Attendance: 1,200; Referee: José María Palacios Aragonés

June 16	Santa Eulàlia	3 – 3 (4 – 5 agg.)	Arandina	Santa Eulària des Riu (Balearic Islands)
20:00 (CEST)	Pomar 15'; Piquero 61' (pen.), 84' (pen.)	Report	Mato 21'; Ayrton 53', 94'	Stadium: Camp Municipal; Attendance: 1,400; Referee: Héctor Robas Bondia

=== Final round ===
==== Qualified teams ====
The draw was held in the RFEF headquarters, in Las Rozas (Madrid), on 17 June 2013, 16:45 CEST.

Group	Position	Team	Notes
3	1st	Tropezón	Group Winners promotion play-off losers
4	1st	Laudio	Group Winners promotion play-off losers
5	1st	Olot	Group Winners promotion play-off losers
9	1st	El Palo	Group Winners promotion play-off losers
14	1st	Extremadura	Group Winners promotion play-off losers

Group	Position	Team
1	2nd	Celta B
2	2nd	Universidad de Oviedo
4	2nd	Arenas Club
8	2nd	Cultural Leonesa
11	2nd	Poblense
13	2nd	Cieza
18	2nd	Conquense

Group	Position	Team
1	3rd	Compostela
6	3rd	Alzira
8	3rd	Arandina
9	3rd	Granada B
13	3rd	Mar Menor

Group	Position	Team
1	4th	Deportivo B

=== Matches ===
Team 1	Agg.	Team 2	1st leg	2nd leg
Deportivo B	4–4 (a)	El Palo	4–2	0–2
Alzira	1–1 (a)	Tropezón	1–1	0–0
Granada B	2–2 (a)	Extremadura	1–0	1–2
Arandina	4–7	Olot	3–2	1–5
Mar Menor	0–1	Laudio	0–0	0–1
Compostela	4–0	Cieza	2–0	2–0
Conquense	4–1	Poblense	3–1	1–0
Cultural Leonesa	3–2	Universidad de Oviedo	1–1	2–1 (a.e.t.)
Celta B	2–2 (a)	Arenas Club	0–0	2–2

The aggregate winners will be promoted to Segunda División B.

==== First leg ====
June 22	Granada B	1 – 0	Extremadura	Granada
18:30 (CEST)	Pedro 4'	Report		Stadium: Estadio Nuevo Los Cármenes; Attendance: 7,000; Referee: Jorge Moya García

June 22	Arandina	3 – 2	Olot	Aranda de Duero (Burgos)
19:00 (CEST)	Peña 45' (o.g.); Ayrton 48'; Mato 59'	Report	Abel 10'; Roger 30'	Stadium: Estadio El Montecillo; Attendance: 3,000; Referee: Azíbar Elexpuru Sanz

June 22	Compostela	2 – 0	Cieza	Santiago de Compostela (A Coruña)
19:00 (CEST)	Manu 47'; Yahvé 84'	Report		Stadium: Multiusos de San Lázaro; Attendance: 4,500; Referee: Leandro Carbajales Gómez

June 22	Conquense	3 – 1	Poblense	Cuenca
19:00 (CEST)	Lázaro 40', 54'; Tomeu 82' (o.g.)	Report	Arnau 50'	Stadium: Estadio La Fuensanta; Attendance: 2,500; Referee: Roberto Carralero Calvo

June 23	Mar Menor	0 – 0	Laudio	San Javier (Region of Murcia)
12:00 (CEST)		Report		Stadium: Estadio Pitín; Attendance: 2,000; Referee: Jacob Yáñez Megías

June 23	Deportivo B	4 – 2	El Palo	A Coruña
17:00 (CEST)	Luis Fernández 5', 7', 42'; Álvaro Lemos 61'	Report	Antonio Muñoz 10'; Nacho Aranda 38'	Stadium: Estadio Riazor; Attendance: 9,500; Referee: Francisco Javier Manso García

June 23	Celta B	0 – 0	Arenas Club	Vigo (Pontevedra)
18:00 (CEST)		Report		Stadium: Municipal de Barreiro; Attendance: 2,000; Referee: Víctor Gijón Peñas

June 23	Alzira	1 – 1	Tropezón	Alzira (Valencia)
18:30 (CEST)	David Verdú 23'	Report	Perujo 75'	Stadium: Estadio Luis Suñer Picó; Attendance: 3,000; Referee: Rubén Ruiperez Marín

June 23	Cultural Leonesa	1 – 1	Universidad de Oviedo	León
20:00 (CEST)	Ortiz 56'	Report	Llerandi 9'	Stadium: Reino de León; Attendance: 5,000; Referee: Pedro Alonso Simón

==== Second leg ====
June 29	Laudio	1 – 0 (1 – 0 agg.)	Mar Menor	Laudio/Llodio (Álava)
17:30 (CEST)	Germán 69'	Report		Stadium: Estadio Ellakuri; Attendance: 2,000; Referee: Sebastián Vacalie

June 29	Arenas Club	2 – 2 (2 – 2 agg.)	Celta B	Getxo (Bizkaia)
18:30 (CEST)	Imanol 24'; Valero 55'	Report	Madinda 7'; Santi Mina 22'	Stadium: Estadio Nuevo Gobela; Attendance: 1,200; Referee: Jorge Fernández Fernández

June 29	Olot	5 – 1 (7 – 4 agg.)	Arandina	Olot (Girona)
18:30 (CEST)	Carlos 3', 34', 57'; Raúl Rodríguez 36'; Edile 90+1'	Report	Gustavo 53'	Stadium: Estadi Municipal d'Olot; Attendance: 3,815; Referee: Antonio Gordillo Aguilar

June 29	Poblense	0 – 1 (1 – 4 agg.)	Conquense	Sa Pobla (Balearic Islands)
19:00 (CEST)			Lázaro 64'	Stadium: Nou Camp de Sa Pobla; Attendance: 5,000; Referee: Carlos Rodríguez Enrique

June 29	El Palo	2 – 0 (4 – 4 agg.)	Deportivo B	Málaga
20:00 (CEST)	Jesule 60'; Ismael 82'	Report		Stadium: Campo de Fútbol San Ignacio; Attendance: 900; Referee: José Manuel Pardo Martínez

June 30	Universidad de Oviedo	1 – 2 (a.e.t.) (2 – 3 agg.)	Cultural Leonesa	Oviedo
12:00 (CEST)	Otero 49'	Report	Hedrera 20'; David Álvarez 115'	Stadium: Estadio Universitario San Gregorio; Attendance: 3,500; Referee: Breogán Antón Martínez Vila

June 30	Tropezón	0 – 0 (1 – 1 agg.)	Alzira	Tanos (Cantabria)
18:00 (CEST)		Report		Stadium: Campo de Fútbol Municipal Santa Ana; Attendance: 1,500; Referee: Unai Lopategi Sanz

June 30	Cieza	0 – 2 (0 – 4 agg.)	Compostela	Cieza (Region of Murcia)
19:00 (CEST)		Report	Jordán 47'; Marcos Suárez 82'	Stadium: Campo Municipal de Fútbol La Arboleja; Attendance: 3,900; Referee: Jonathan Bernabeu Peña

June 30	Extremadura	2 – 1 (2 – 2 agg.)	Granada B	Almendralejo (Badajoz)
20:00 (CEST)	Sabino 31', 90+3'	Report	Nico 5'	Stadium: Francisco de la Hera; Attendance: 8,500; Referee: Ramón Mora Correas

Promoted to Segunda División B
Laudio (First time ever)	Celta B (1 year later)	Olot (First time ever)	Conquense (1 year later)	El Palo (First time ever)	Cultural Leonesa (2 years later)	Tropezón (12 years later)	Compostela (3 years later)	Granada B (First time ever)

== See also ==
- 2013 Segunda División play-offs
- 2013 Segunda División B play-offs
