= List of Spanish football transfers winter 2009–10 =

This is a list of Spanish football transfers for the January sale in the 2009–10 season of La Liga and Segunda División. Only moves from La Liga and Segunda División are listed.

The winter transfer window opened on 1 January 2010, although a few transfers took place prior to that date. The window closed at midnight on 1 February 2010. Players without a club could have joined one at any time, either during or in between transfer windows. Clubs below La Liga level could also have signed players on loan at any time. If need be, clubs could have signed a goalkeeper on an emergency loan, if all others were unavailable.

== Winter 2009–10 transfer window ==
| Date | Name | Moving from | Moving to | Fee |
|---|---|---|---|---|
| 2009-10-01 | (Cameroon) Modeste M'bami | Free agent | (Spain) UD Almería | Free |
| 2009-10-17 | (Japan) Hiroshi Ibusuki | (Spain) Girona FC | (Spain) Real Zaragoza | Loan |
| 2009-10-20 | (Argentina) Leonardo Borzani | (Argentina) Rosario Central | (Spain) UD Almería | Free |
| 2009-11-02 | (Spain) Toni Doblas | Free agent | (Spain) SD Huesca | Free |
| 2009-11-19 | (Spain) Francisco Gallardo | Free agent | (Spain) SD Huesca | Free |
| 2009-11-23 | (Uruguay) Javier Chevantón | (Spain) Sevilla FC | (Italy) Atalanta BC | Loan |
| 2009-11-24 | (Argentina) Lucas Licht | (Spain) Getafe CF | (Argentina) Racing Club de Avellaneda | Free |
| 2009-11-27 | (Chile) Nicolás Medina | (Spain) CA Osasuna | (Spain) CD Castellón | Loan |
| 2009-12-04 | (Colombia) Mauricio Arroyo | (Colombia) Real Cartagena | (Spain) Gimnàstic de Tarragona | Loan |
| 2009-12-13 | (Uruguay) Nacho González | (Spain) Valencia CF | (Greece) Levadiakos F.C. | Loan |
| 2009-12-13 | (Argentina) Alejandro Domínguez | (Russia) FC Rubin Kazan | (Spain) Valencia CF | Free |
| 2009-12-17 | (Spain) Salvador Pérez | (Spain) Villarreal CF B | (Spain) CP Cacereño | Loan |
| 2009-12-22 | (France) Johann Charpenet | (Spain) Polideportivo Ejido | (Spain) Elche CF | Free |
| 2009-12-26 | (France) Sinama Pongolle | (Spain) Atlético Madrid | (Portugal) Sporting C.P. | €6.5m |
| 2009-12-27 | (Spain) Ion Echaide | (Spain) SD Huesca | (Spain) CA Osasuna | Loan return |
| 2009-12-27 | (Serbia) Goran Marić | Free agent | (Spain) Real Unión | Free |
| 2009-12-28 | (Spain) Carlos de la Vega | (Spain) Rayo Vallecano | (Spain) SD Huesca | Loan |
| 2009-12-28 | (Argentina) Germán Pacheco | (Spain) Rayo Vallecano | (Spain) Atlético Madrid | Loan return |
| 2009-12-28 | (Argentina) Sebastián Nayar | (Spain) Recreativo de Huelva | (Colombia) Deportivo Cali | Free |
| 2009-12-29 | (Spain) Rodri Gil | (Spain) Elche CF | (Spain) CF Atlético Ciudad | Free |
| 2009-12-29 | (Venezuela) José Manuel Velásquez | (Venezuela) Deportivo Anzoátegui | (Spain) Villarreal CF B | Free |
| 2009-12-29 | (Spain) Javier Portillo | (Spain) CA Osasuna | (Spain) Hércules CF | Free |
| 2009-12-31 | (Venezuela) Giancarlo Maldonado | (Spain) Xerez CD | (Mexico) Atlante FC | Loan return |
| 2010-01-02 | (Argentina) Mariano Uglessich | (Spain) Albacete Balompié | (Paraguay) Club Olimpia | Free |
| 2010-01-04 | (Romania) László Sepsi | (Spain) Racing de Santander | (Portugal) S.L. Benfica | Loan return |
| 2010-01-04 | (Serbia) Miloš Bogunović | (Serbia) FK Partizan | (Spain) Cádiz CF | Loan |
| 2010-01-04 | (Ecuador) Felipe Caicedo | (England) Manchester City | (Spain) Málaga CF | Loan |
| 2010-01-05 | (Venezuela) Miku | (Spain) Valencia CF | (Spain) Getafe CF | Free |
| 2010-01-05 | (Venezuela) Dani Hernández | (Spain) SD Huesca | (Spain) Rayo Vallecano | Loan return |
| 2010-01-05 | (Argentina) Fabricio Fuentes | (Spain) Villarreal CF | (Mexico) F.C. Atlas | Free |
| 2010-01-06 | (Lithuania) Marius Stankevičius | (Italy) U.C. Sampdoria | (Spain) Sevilla FC | Loan |
| 2010-01-06 | (Venezuela) Dani Hernández | (Spain) Rayo Vallecano | (Spain) Valencia CF Mestalla | Loan |
| 2010-01-07 | (Spain) Fernando López | (Spain) Córdoba CF | (Slovakia) MFK Košice | Free |
| 2010-01-07 | (Portugal) Eliseu | (Italy) S.S. Lazio | (Spain) Real Zaragoza | Loan |
| 2010-01-07 | (Spain) Joseba Arriaga | (Spain) Cádiz CF | (Spain) Deportivo Alavés | Loan |
| 2010-01-07 | (Spain) Míchel Madera | (Spain) Sporting de Gijón | (England) Birmingham City | €3.3m |
| 2010-01-07 | (Portugal) Tiago Mendes | (Italy) Juventus FC | (Spain) Atlético Madrid | Loan |
| 2010-01-08 | (Chile) Humberto Suazo | (Mexico) C.F. Monterrey | (Spain) Real Zaragoza | Loan |
| 2010-01-08 | (Argentina) Maxi Rodríguez | (Spain) Atlético Madrid | (England) Liverpool | €1.5m |
| 2010-01-10 | (Argentina) Pablo Daniel Osvaldo | (Italy) Bologna F.C. 1909 | (Spain) RCD Espanyol | Loan |
| 2010-01-11 | (Spain) Paco Esteban | Free agent | (Spain) Elche CF | Free |
| 2010-01-11 | (Argentina) Eduardo Salvio | (Argentina) Club Atlético Lanús | (Spain) Atlético Madrid | €8m |
| 2010-01-14 | (Czech Republic) Jiří Jarošík | (Russia) FC Krylia Sovetov | (Spain) Real Zaragoza | Free |
| 2010-01-14 | (Spain) Jesús María Lacruz | Free agent | (Spain) Real Unión | Free |
| 2010-01-14 | (Spain) Iván Cuadrado | (Spain) Málaga CF | (Spain) Rayo Vallecano | Free |
| 2010-01-14 | (Portugal) Edinho | (Spain) Málaga CF | (Greece) PAOK | Loan |
| 2010-01-15 | (Spain) Carlos David Moreno | (Belgium) R.E. Mouscron | (Spain) Celta de Vigo | Free |
| 2010-01-16 | (Portugal) David Silva | (Bulgaria) PFC CSKA Sofia | (Spain) CD Castellón | Loan |
| 2010-01-16 | (Spain) Héctor Simón | (Spain) Girona FC | (Spain) Benidorm CF | Free |
| 2010-01-16 | (Spain) Neru | (Spain) Deportivo Alavés | (Spain) SD Huesca | Free |
| 2010-01-18 | (Spain) Jonathan Pereira | (Spain) Villarreal CF | (Spain) Real Betis | €2.5m |
| 2010-01-18 | (Spain) Kike Sola | (Spain) CD Numancia | (Greece) Levadiakos F.C. | Free |
| 2010-01-18 | (Slovenia) Branko Ilič | (Spain) Real Betis | (Russia) FK Moscow | Free |
| 2010-01-18 | (Argentina) Danilo Gerlo | Free agent | (Spain) Real Unión | Free |
| 2010-01-19 | (France) Franck Signorino | (Spain) Getafe CF | (Spain) FC Cartagena | Loan |
| 2010-01-20 | (Spain) Patricio Moreno | (Spain) CD Don Benito | (Spain) Elche CF | Free |
| 2010-01-20 | (Spain) Asier Arranz | (Spain) Real Valladolid | (Spain) CD Numancia | Free |
| 2010-01-21 | (Uruguay) Fernando Fajardo | Free agent | (Spain) Albacete Balompié | Free |
| 2010-01-21 | (Spain) Edu Moya | (Spain) Celta de Vigo | (Spain) Hércules CF | Free |
| 2010-01-21 | (Greece) Dimitrios Papadopoulos | (Croatia) NK Dinamo Zagreb | (Spain) Celta de Vigo | Free |
| 2010-01-21 | (Spain) Jonatan Valle | (Spain) CD Castellón | (Spain) SD Ponferradina | Loan |
| 2010-01-22 | (Spain) Adrián Ripa | (Spain) Orihuela CF | (Spain) Elche CF | Free |
| 2010-01-22 | (Cameroon) Franck Songo'o | (Spain) Real Zaragoza | (Spain) Real Sociedad | Loan |
| 2010-01-22 | (Spain) Marcos Tébar | (Spain) Real Madrid Castilla | (Spain) Girona FC | Loan |
| 2010-01-22 | (Spain) Braulio Nóbrega | (Spain) Real Zaragoza | (Spain) Recreativo de Huelva | Loan |
| 2010-01-22 | (Spain) Adrián Colunga | (Spain) Recreativo de Huelva | (Spain) Real Zaragoza | Loan |
| 2010-01-22 | (Spain) Mikel Amantegi | (Spain) Albacete Balompié | (Spain) Benidorm CF | Free |
| 2010-01-23 | (Netherlands) Ruud van Nistelrooy | (Spain) Real Madrid | (Germany) Hamburger SV | Free |
| 2010-01-24 | (Spain) Javier Modrego | (Spain) Real Madrid Castilla | (Spain) Villarreal CF B | Free |
| 2010-01-25 | (Spain) Roberto Batres | (Spain) Atlético Madrid | (China) Shanghai Shenhua | Loan |
| 2010-01-25 | (Spain) Andreu Guerao | (Spain) Sporting de Gijón | (Poland) Polonia Warsaw | Free |
| 2010-01-25 | (Brazil) Cléber Santana | (Spain) Atlético Madrid | (Brazil) São Paulo | Free |
| 2010-01-25 | (Spain) Javier López Vallejo | (Spain) Real Zaragoza | (Greece) Levadiakos F.C. | Free |
| 2010-01-25 | (Spain) Roberto Jiménez | (Spain) Atlético Madrid | (Spain) Real Zaragoza | Loan |
| 2010-01-26 | (Romania) Cosmin Contra | (Spain) Getafe CF | (Romania) FC Timişoara | Free |
| 2010-01-26 | (Argentina) Gastón Cellerino | (Italy) Livorno Calcio | (Spain) Celta de Vigo | Loan |
| 2010-01-26 | (Portugal) Daniel Candeias | (Spain) Recreativo de Huelva | (Portugal) F.C. Porto | Loan return |
| 2010-01-26 | (Serbia) Milan Smiljanić | (Spain) RCD Espanyol | (Spain) Sporting de Gijón | Loan |
| 2010-01-26 | (Spain) Juan José Collantes | (Spain) Rayo Vallecano | (Spain) Granada CF | Free |
| 2010-01-26 | (Uruguay) Sebastián Eguren | (Spain) Villarreal CF | (Italy) S.S. Lazio | Loan |
| 2010-01-26 | (Spain) Óscar Díaz | (Spain) RCD Mallorca | (Spain) Recreativo de Huelva | Loan |
| 2010-01-26 | (Spain) Xabier Etxeita | (Spain) Athletic Bilbao | (Spain) FC Cartagena | Loan |
| 2010-01-27 | (Uruguay) Joe Bizera | (Greece) PAOK | (Spain) Albacete Balompié | Free |
| 2010-01-27 | (Argentina) Gustavo Alustiza | (Argentina) Chacarita Juniors | (Spain) Xerez CD | Loan |
| 2010-01-27 | (Italy) Matteo Contini | (Italy) S.S.C. Napoli | (Spain) Real Zaragoza | Loan |
| 2010-01-27 | (Spain) Daniel Martín | (Spain) Real Betis | (Spain) Recreativo de Huelva | Free |
| 2010-01-27 | (Spain) Guille Roldán | (Spain) CF Atlético Ciudad | (Spain) Albacete Balompié | Free |
| 2010-01-27 | (Brazil) Igor de Souza | (Spain) Levante UD | (Spain) Pontevedra CF | Loan return |
| 2010-01-27 | (Spain) Rafa Jordá | (Spain) Hércules CF | (Spain) Levante UD | Free |
| 2010-01-27 | (Spain) Javi Castellano | (Spain) Albacete Balompié | (Spain) RCD Mallorca | Loan return |
| 2010-01-28 | (Spain) Keko Gontán | (Spain) Atlético Madrid | (Spain) Real Valladolid | Loan |
| 2010-01-28 | (Spain) Javier Balboa | (Portugal) S.L. Benfica | (Spain) FC Cartagena | Loan |
| 2010-01-29 | (Spain) Javi Lara | (Spain) Elche CF | (Spain) CD Alcoyano | Loan |
| 2010-01-29 | (Spain) Juanfran García | (Greece) AEK Athens | (Spain) Levante UD | Free |
| 2010-01-30 | (Spain) Mario Ortiz | (Spain) Racing de Santander B | (Spain) CD Castellón | Loan |
| 2010-01-30 | (Spain) Asier del Horno | (Spain) Valencia CF | (Spain) Real Valladolid | Loan |
| 2010-01-30 | (Brazil) Ilan Araujo | (France) AS Saint-Étienne | (Spain) Racing de Santander | Free |
| 2010-01-30 | (Brazil) Felipe Manoel | Free agent | (Spain) Villarreal CF B | Free |
| 2010-01-31 | (Brazil) Keirrison | (Portugal) S.L. Benfica | (Spain) FC Barcelona | Loan return |
| 2010-01-31 | (Brazil) Keirrison | (Spain) FC Barcelona | (Italy) ACF Fiorentina | Loan |
| 2010-01-31 | (Uruguay) Nicolás Vigneri | (Mexico) Puebla F.C. | (Spain) Xerez CD | Loan |
| 2010-01-31 | (Brazil) Edmílson | (Brazil) Palmeiras | (Spain) Real Zaragoza | Free |
| 2010-01-31 | (Uruguay) Jonathan Ramis | (Uruguay) C.A. Peñarol | (Spain) Cádiz CF | Loan |
| 2010-02-01 | (Ivory Coast) Arouna Koné | (Spain) Sevilla FC | (Germany) Hannover 96 | Loan |
| 2010-02-01 | (Spain) Juan Carlos Moreno | (Spain) CD Numancia | (Spain) FC Cartagena | Free |
| 2010-02-01 | (Spain) Armiche Ortega | (Spain) UD Las Palmas | (Spain) Benidorm CF | Loan |
| 2010-02-01 | (Spain) Emilio Guerra | (Spain) CF Atlético Ciudad | (Spain) CD Castellón | Free |
| 2010-02-01 | (Portugal) Henrique Sereno | (Portugal) Vitória S.C. | (Spain) Real Valladolid | Free |
| 2010-02-01 | (Spain) Juan José Pereira | (Spain) Cultural y Deportiva Leonesa | (Spain) Albacete Balompié | Free |
| 2010-02-01 | (Spain) Igor Angulo | (Spain) Écija Balompié | (Spain) CD Numancia | Free |
| 2010-02-01 | (Spain) Óscar Sielva | (Spain) FC Cartagena | (Spain) RCD Espanyol | Loan return |
| 2010-02-01 | (Switzerland) Alexandre Geijo | (Spain) Racing de Santander | (Italy) Udinese Calcio | €2.5m |
| 2010-02-01 | (Spain) Germán Beltrán | (Spain) SD Eibar | (Spain) Girona FC | Free |
| 2010-02-01 | (Argentina) Brian Sarmiento | (Spain) Girona FC | (Spain) Racing de Santander | Loan return |
| 2010-02-01 | (Spain) Pedro Vega | (Spain) UD Las Palmas | (Spain) Universidad LPGC | Loan |
| 2010-02-01 | (Peru) Juan Diego González-Vigil | (Peru) Alianza Lima | (Spain) FC Cartagena | Free |
| 2010-02-01 | (Spain) Óscar López | (Spain) Real Betis | (Spain) CD Numancia | Free |
| 2010-02-01 | (Uruguay) Diego Scotti | (Uruguay) Racing de Montevideo | (Spain) Córdoba CF | Free |
| 2010-02-01 | (Spain) Jonay Díaz | (Spain) SD Huesca | (Spain) CD Tenerife B | Free |
| 2010-02-01 | (Spain) Fernando Velasco | (Spain) Cádiz CF | (Spain) AD Ceuta | Loan |
| 2010-02-01 | (Brazil) Gilvan Gomes | Free agent | (Spain) SD Huesca | Free |
| 2010-02-01 | (Spain) Rafa Gómez | (Spain) Elche CF | (Spain) Sangonera Atlético CF | Loan |
| 2010-02-01 | (Spain) Santi Santos | (Spain) FC Cartagena | (Spain) Cultural y Deportiva Leonesa | Free |
| 2010-02-01 | (Spain) Joseba Agirre | (Spain) Real Unión | (Spain) CD Laudio | Free |
| 2010-02-01 | (Spain) Oier Larraínzar | (Spain) Real Unión | (Spain) CD Laudio | Free |
| 2010-02-01 | (Spain) Juan Pablo Ruiz | (Spain) FC Cartagena | (Spain) Valencia CF Mestalla | Free |
| 2010-02-01 | (Argentina) Roberto Ayala | (Spain) Real Zaragoza | (Argentina) Racing Club de Avellaneda | Free |
| 2010-02-11 | (Spain) David Sánchez | Free agent | (Spain) CD Castellón | Free |
| 2010-02-16 | (Brazil) Thiago Carleto | (Spain) Elche CF | (Spain) Valencia CF | Loan return |
| 2010-02-16 | (Brazil) Thiago Carleto | (Spain) Valencia CF | (Brazil) São Paulo | Loan |
| 2010-02-16 | (Switzerland) Fabio Celestini | (Spain) Getafe CF | (Switzerland) FC Lausanne-Sport | Free |
| 2010-02-17 | (Spain) Jordi Figueras | (Spain) Celta de Vigo | (Russia) FC Rubin Kazan | €0.9m |
| 2010-02-22 | (Brazil) Ewerthon | (Spain) Real Zaragoza | (Brazil) Palmeiras | Free |
| 2010-02-22 | (Brazil) Pablo de Barros | (Spain) Real Zaragoza | (Spain) Gimnàstic de Tarragona | Loan |
| 2010-02-26 | (Japan) Shunsuke Nakamura | (Spain) RCD Espanyol | (Japan) Yokohama Marinos | €1m |
| 2010-03-03 | (Brazil) Rodrigo Silva | Free agent | (Spain) SD Huesca | Free |

== See also ==
- List of Spanish football transfers summer 2009
