= 2012–13 Tercera División =

Tercera División
- Season: 2012–13
- Promoted: Racing de Ferrol; Sariñena; Puerta Bonita; La Hoya Lorca; Las Palmas Atlético; Algeciras; Elche Ilicitano; Burgos; Toledo; Laudio; Celta B Olot; Conquense; El Palo; Cultural Leonesa; Tropezón; Compostela; Granada B

The 2012–13 Tercera División was the fourth tier of football in Spain. Play started on 24 August 2012 and the season ended on 30 June 2013 with the promotion play-off finals.

== Overview ==
There were 359 clubs competing in Tercera División (Third division) in the 2012–13 season, divided into 18 regional groups, accommodating between 18 and 21 clubs.

The following clubs finished as champions of their respective groups

- Grupo I (Galicia) - Racing de Ferrol
- Grupo II (Asturias) - Tuilla
- Grupo III (Cantabria) - Tropezón
- Grupo IV (País Vasco) - Laudio
- Grupo V (Cataluña) - Olot
- Grupo VI (Comunidad Valenciana) - Elche Ilicitano
- Grupo VII (Comunidad de Madrid) - Puerta Bonita
- Grupo VIII (Castilla & León) - Burgos
- Grupo IX (Andalucía Oriental (Almería, Granada, Jaén & Málaga) & Melilla) - El Palo
- Grupo X (Andalucía Occidental (Cádiz, Córdoba, Huelva & Sevilla) & Ceuta) - Algeciras
- Grupo XI (Islas Baleares) - Santa Eulàlia
- Grupo XII (Canarias) - Las Palmas Atlético
- Grupo XIII (Región de Murcia) - La Hoya Lorca
- Grupo XIV (Extremadura) - Extremadura
- Grupo XV (Navarra) - San Juan
- Grupo XVI (La Rioja) - Haro
- Grupo XVII (Aragón) - Sariñena
- Grupo XVIII (Castilla-La Mancha) - Toledo

The 18 group champion clubs participated in the Group winners promotion play-off and the losers from these 9 play-off ties then proceeded to the Non-champions promotion play-off with clubs finishing second third and fourth.

== League standings ==
Key to colours in league table:
Promoted via playoffs
Participated in playoffs
Direct relegation

=== Group I - Galicia ===
Pos	Team	Pld	W	D	L	GF	GA	GD	Pts
1	Racing Ferrol (C, P)	38	32	1	5	98	22	+76	97
2	Celta B (P)	38	22	11	5	75	34	+41	77
3	Compostela (P)	38	21	10	7	64	28	+36	73
4	Deportivo B	38	21	8	9	76	33	+43	71
5	Pontevedra	38	17	12	9	57	45	+12	63
6	As Pontes	38	18	5	15	56	53	+3	59
7	Órdenes	38	14	13	11	45	38	+7	55
8	Rápido Bouzas	38	14	10	14	39	53	−14	52
9	Alondras	38	14	10	14	48	45	+3	52
10	Racing Villalbés	38	12	12	14	45	42	+3	48
11	Cerceda	38	12	12	14	35	44	−9	48
12	Somozas	38	11	14	13	41	45	−4	47
13	Betanzos	38	13	8	17	48	61	−13	47
14	Barbadás	38	12	11	15	39	47	−8	47
15	Negreira	38	12	9	17	37	56	−19	45
16	Dorneda	38	13	6	19	37	55	−18	45
17	Villalonga (R)	38	11	12	15	44	50	−6	45
18	Bergantiños (R)	38	8	6	24	28	63	−35	30
19	Céltiga (R)	38	5	10	23	28	71	−43	25
20	Narón (R)	38	4	8	26	30	85	−55	20

(C) Champions; (P) Promoted; (R) Relegated

Top goalscorer

Goalscorers	Goals	Team
(Spain) Joselu	26	Compostela
(Spain) Manu Barreiro	21	Racing Ferrol
(Spain) Luis Fernández	21	Deportivo B
(Spain) Jorge Rodríguez	20	Racing Ferrol
(Spain) Nacho Fernández	16	Órdenes

Top goalkeeper

Goalkeeper	Goals	Matches	Average	Team
(Spain) Adrián Laureda	27	37	0.73	Compostela

=== Group II - Asturias ===
Pos	Team	Pld	W	D	L	GF	GA	GD	Pts
1	Tuilla (C)	38	25	6	7	70	35	+35	81
2	Universidad Oviedo	38	22	9	7	59	28	+31	75
3	Covadonga	38	21	9	8	58	30	+28	72
4	Langreo	38	20	11	7	54	22	+32	71
5	Real Oviedo B	38	17	10	11	51	47	+4	61
6	Lealtad	38	15	11	12	52	42	+10	56
7	L'Entregu	38	13	15	10	42	39	+3	54
8	Condal	38	15	9	14	48	42	+6	54
9	Cudillero	38	13	14	11	46	40	+6	53
10	Luarca	38	13	12	13	42	43	−1	51
11	Praviano	38	13	11	14	37	50	−13	50
12	Ceares	38	13	9	16	43	48	−5	48
13	Urraca	38	11	12	15	55	57	−2	45
14	Tapia	38	11	10	17	34	43	−9	43
15	Gijón Industrial	38	10	13	15	35	42	−7	43
16	Candás	38	11	9	18	37	56	−19	42
17	Atlético Lugones	38	10	12	16	42	52	−10	42
18	Llanes (R)	38	8	18	12	36	45	−9	42
19	Navia (R)	38	5	13	20	35	73	−38	28
20	Navarro (R)	38	3	9	26	27	69	−42	18

(C) Champions; (R) Relegated

Top goalscorer

Goalscorers	Goals	Team
(Spain) Chus Jiménez	21	Covadonga
(Spain) Nacho García	19	Luarca
(Uruguay) Germán Fassani	18	Gijón Industrial
(Spain) Gusi	17	Urraca
(Spain) Jorge Vázquez	17	Ceares

Top goalkeeper

Goalkeeper	Goals	Matches	Average	Team
(Spain) Guillermo Suárez	22	37	0.59	Langreo

=== Group III - Cantabria ===
Pos	Team	Pld	W	D	L	GF	GA	GD	Pts
1	Tropezón (C, P)	38	25	8	5	87	32	+55	83
2	Rayo Cantabria	38	25	8	5	76	27	+49	83
3	Cayón	38	20	13	5	50	22	+28	73
4	Laredo	38	18	14	6	54	30	+24	68
5	Castro	38	20	8	10	52	33	+19	68
6	Vimenor	38	17	10	11	53	43	+10	61
7	Barreda	38	17	9	12	50	44	+6	60
8	Santoña	38	16	10	12	53	51	+2	58
9	Siete Villas	38	15	8	15	48	49	−1	53
10	Guarnizo	38	13	13	12	45	41	+4	52
11	Escobedo	38	14	9	15	67	54	+13	51
12	Gama	38	15	5	18	35	42	−7	50
13	Bezana	38	11	14	13	42	47	−5	47
14	Atlético Albericia	38	12	11	15	50	51	−1	47
15	Pontejos	38	13	8	17	45	55	−10	47
16	Ribamontán	38	11	12	15	42	51	−9	45
17	Santillana (R)	38	9	9	20	43	65	−22	36
18	Textil Escudo (R)	38	8	6	24	35	69	−34	30
19	Meruelo (R)	38	5	7	26	33	85	−52	22
20	San Martín (R)	38	2	6	30	16	85	−69	12

(C) Champions; (P) Promoted; (R) Relegated

Top goalscorer

Goalscorers	Goals	Team
(Spain) Alberto Dorronsoro	31	Tropezón
(Spain) David Vinatea	17	Santoña
(Spain) Raúl Trugeda	17	Santillana
(Spain) Sergio Ruiz	15	Laredo
(Spain) José Luis Agote	15	Ribamontán

Top goalkeeper

Goalkeeper	Goals	Matches	Average	Team
(Spain) Iván González	21	30	0.7	Tropezón

=== Group IV - Basque Country ===
Pos	Team	Pld	W	D	L	GF	GA	GD	Pts
1	Laudio (C, P)	38	23	12	3	65	29	+36	81
2	Arenas Getxo	38	23	9	6	54	24	+30	78
3	Portugalete	38	21	10	7	75	38	+37	73
4	Leioa	38	20	11	7	43	28	+15	71
5	Gernika	38	19	12	7	58	31	+27	69
6	Zalla	38	18	13	7	51	36	+15	67
7	Bermeo	38	12	16	10	52	47	+5	52
8	Durango	38	11	15	12	39	44	−5	48
9	Zamudio	38	11	14	13	41	52	−11	47
10	Beasain	38	11	14	13	38	41	−3	47
11	Lagun Onak	38	11	13	14	36	41	−5	46
12	Baskonia	38	13	6	19	49	59	−10	45
13	Pasaia	38	10	13	15	43	64	−21	43
14	Alavés B	38	11	10	17	40	48	−8	43
15	Elgoibar	38	10	13	15	35	42	−7	43
16	Santutxu	38	10	11	17	39	55	−16	41
17	Balmaseda	38	11	7	20	49	57	−8	40
18	Getxo (R)	38	9	12	17	34	49	−15	39
19	Aurrerá (R)	38	7	8	23	27	57	−30	29
20	Anaitasuna (R)	38	6	7	25	35	61	−26	25

(C) Champions; (P) Promoted; (R) Relegated

Top goalscorer

Goalscorers	Goals	Team
(Spain) Murci	25	Arenas Getxo
(Spain) Ander Vitoria	23	Portugalete
(Spain) Sabin Merino	16	Baskonia
(Spain) Sergio Martín	16	Portugalete
(Spain) Germán Beltrán	15	Laudio

Top goalkeeper

Goalkeeper	Goals	Matches	Average	Team
(Spain) Txemi Talledo	23	37	0.62	Arenas Getxo

=== Group V - Catalonia ===
Pos	Team	Pld	W	D	L	GF	GA	GD	Pts
1	Olot (C, P)	38	24	7	7	66	29	+37	79
2	Cornellà	38	23	10	5	70	35	+35	79
3	Europa	38	21	12	5	55	25	+30	75
4	Manlleu	38	17	14	7	46	29	+17	65
5	Figueres	38	16	11	11	52	45	+7	59
6	Terrassa	38	15	12	11	47	36	+11	57
7	Pobla Mafumet	38	14	10	14	49	50	−1	52
8	Rapitenca	38	12	16	10	46	39	+7	52
9	Gramenet	38	10	19	9	34	33	+1	49
10	Gavà	38	13	9	16	38	42	−4	48
11	Rubí	38	11	14	13	58	52	+6	47
12	Palamós	38	11	13	14	48	55	−7	46
13	Castelldefels	38	11	12	15	31	45	−14	45
14	Vilassar	38	11	11	16	44	47	−3	44
15	Santboià	38	9	15	14	41	47	−6	42
16	Vilafranca	38	11	9	18	35	53	−18	42
17	Montañesa	38	8	16	14	32	49	−17	40
18	Júpiter (R)	38	9	10	19	41	59	−18	37
19	Vic (R)	38	8	12	18	40	61	−21	36
20	Balaguer (R)	38	4	12	22	35	77	−42	24

(C) Champions; (P) Promoted; (R) Relegated

Top goalscorer

Goalscorers	Goals	Team
(Spain) Carlos Martínez	26	Olot
(Spain) Enric Gallego	23	Cornellà
(Spain) Javi Sánchez	22	Rubí
(Spain) Xavier Revert	20	Palamós
(Spain) Elhadji Bandeh	15	Júpiter

Top goalkeeper

Goalkeeper	Goals	Matches	Average	Team
(Spain) Rafael Leva	19	30	0.63	Europa

=== Group VI - Valencian Community ===
Pos	Team	Pld	W	D	L	GF	GA	GD	Pts
1	Elche Ilicitano (C, P)	40	20	11	9	48	28	+20	71
2	Novelda	40	21	8	11	50	37	+13	71
3	Alzira	40	21	6	13	50	39	+11	69
4	Castellón	40	18	14	8	58	29	+29	68
5	La Nucía	40	16	14	10	47	36	+11	62
6	Muro	40	17	8	15	53	47	+6	59
7	Villarreal C	40	16	11	13	53	50	+3	59
8	Borriol	40	14	15	11	52	39	+13	57
9	Utiel	40	15	11	14	44	40	+4	56
10	Eldense	40	12	17	11	45	39	+6	53
11	Atlético Saguntino	40	15	8	17	36	46	−10	53
12	Torrevieja	40	13	13	14	45	42	+3	52
13	Jove Español	40	13	11	16	44	48	−4	50
14	Llosa	40	12	14	14	44	46	−2	50
15	Gandía (R)	40	13	11	16	36	39	−3	50 (Note: Team resigned at the end of the season and was relegated)
16	Ribarroja	40	12	12	16	35	46	−11	48
17	Acero	40	12	12	16	49	59	−10	48
18	Burriana (R)	40	12	11	17	40	57	−17	47
19	Crevillente (R)	40	10	15	15	41	52	−11	45
20	Dénia (R)	40	10	12	18	43	56	−13	42
21	Catarroja (R)	40	6	10	24	29	67	−38	25 (Note: Team deducted 3 points due to a non-appearance)

(C) Champions; (P) Promoted; (R) Relegated
Notes:

Top goalscorer

Goalscorers	Goals	Team
(Spain) Christian Perales	22	Novelda
(Spain) Raúl Caballero	16	Borriol
(Spain) Petu	15	La Nucía
(Spain) Oliva	15	Acero
(Spain) Iván Agudo	15	Villarreal C

Top goalkeeper

Goalkeeper	Goals	Matches	Average	Team
(Spain) Salva de la Cruz	27	39	0.69	Castellón

=== Group VII - Community of Madrid ===
Pos	Team	Pld	W	D	L	GF	GA	GD	Pts
1	Puerta Bonita (C, P)	38	19	13	6	69	41	+28	70
2	Collado Villalba	38	22	3	13	52	37	+15	69
3	Trival Valderas	38	20	8	10	70	46	+24	68
4	Unión Adarve	38	18	12	8	51	33	+18	66
5	Pozuelo	38	18	10	10	52	33	+19	64
6	Carabanchel	38	17	12	9	59	38	+21	63
7	Parla	38	17	11	10	51	39	+12	62
8	Rayo Majadahonda	38	16	11	11	62	45	+17	59
9	Colmenar Viejo	38	17	8	13	67	50	+17	59
10	Aranjuez	38	14	9	15	48	58	−10	51
11	Internacional	38	13	10	15	43	54	−11	49
12	San Fernando	38	13	9	16	43	49	−6	48
13	Atlético C	38	13	8	17	45	59	−14	47
14	Alcobendas	38	11	14	13	45	46	−1	47
15	Atlético Pinto	38	11	12	15	42	42	0	45
16	Alcorcón B	38	10	12	16	31	50	−19	42
17	Villaviciosa (R)	38	10	11	17	30	45	−15	41
18	Moscardó (R)	38	10	8	20	32	53	−21	38
19	Griñón (R)	38	7	11	20	34	72	−38	32
20	Santa Ana (R)	38	3	10	25	30	66	−36	19

(C) Champions; (P) Promoted; (R) Relegated

Top goalscorer

Goalscorers	Goals	Team
(Spain) Álex García	26	Puerta Bonita
(Spain) Alberto Palacios	18	Trival Valderas
(Spain) Manu Sánchez	16	Colmenar Viejo
(Spain) Asen	14	Rayo Majadahonda
(Spain) Javier Palencia	13	Colmenar Viejo

Top goalkeeper

Goalkeeper	Goals	Matches	Average	Team
(Spain) David de las Heras	29	35	0.83	Unión Adarve

=== Group VIII - Castilla and León ===
Pos	Team	Pld	W	D	L	GF	GA	GD	Pts
1	Burgos (C, P)	38	28	6	4	80	19	+61	90
2	Cultural Leonesa (P)	38	25	7	6	70	25	+45	82
3	Arandina	38	25	7	6	66	22	+44	82
4	Gimnástica Segoviana	38	24	3	11	80	38	+42	75
5	Valladolid B	38	22	7	9	68	25	+43	73
6	La Granja	38	20	9	9	50	36	+14	69
7	Atlético Astorga	38	20	8	10	60	41	+19	68
8	Atlético Bembibre	38	16	11	11	55	43	+12	59
9	Virgen Camino	38	16	9	13	51	51	0	57
10	Real Ávila	38	16	7	15	47	46	+1	55
11	Numancia B	38	15	8	15	51	56	−5	53
12	Cristo Atlético	38	11	10	17	36	47	−11	43
13	Almazán	38	11	10	17	36	55	−19	43
14	Unami	38	11	5	22	39	67	−28	38
15	Salamanca B (Note: Due to Salamanca relegation from Segunda División B to this group, the reserve team, Salamanca B, was forced to relegate to Primera Regional. Salamanca was liquidated due to the accumulation of unpaid debts.) (R)	38	8	12	18	27	48	−21	36
16	Racing Lermeño	38	8	10	20	35	64	−29	34
17	Santa Marta	38	7	11	20	25	50	−25	32
18	Villaralbo (R)	38	9	5	24	24	65	−41	32
19	Cuéllar (R)	38	1	6	31	20	87	−67	9
20	Palencia (D)	38	9	5	24	32	67	−35	0 (Note: Team withdrawn from the competition)

(C) Champions; (D) Disqualified; (P) Promoted; (R) Relegated
Notes:

Top goalscorer

Goalscorers	Goals	Team
(Spain) Juan Carlos Ortiz	27	Cultural Leonesa
(Spain) Fernando Carralero	24	Burgos
(Spain) Quique González	19	Valladolid B
(Spain) Antonio Ramírez	17	Virgen Camino
(Spain) Ayrton Cabral	17	Arandina

Top goalkeeper

Goalkeeper	Goals	Matches	Average	Team
(Spain) Aurreko	18	33	0.55	Burgos

=== Group IX - Eastern Andalusia and Melilla ===
Pos	Team	Pld	W	D	L	GF	GA	GD	Pts
1	El Palo (C, P)	38	20	14	4	72	36	+36	74
2	Atlético Mancha Real	38	20	12	6	50	27	+23	72
3	Granada B (P)	38	21	9	8	73	35	+38	72
4	Atlético Malagueño	38	20	11	7	71	27	+44	71
5	Linares	38	20	10	8	52	30	+22	70
6	Villacarrillo	38	18	11	9	66	41	+25	65
7	Martos	38	18	10	10	52	45	+7	64
8	Vélez	38	14	14	10	51	47	+4	56
9	Atarfe	38	14	11	13	58	48	+10	53
10	Maracena	38	13	12	13	47	49	−2	51
11	Marbella	38	11	16	11	52	53	−1	49
12	Casino Real	38	13	9	16	43	44	−1	48
13	San Pedro	38	12	11	15	50	45	+5	47
14	Ronda	38	12	9	17	53	56	−3	45
15	Unión Estepona	38	12	9	17	45	55	−10	45
16	Huétor Tájar	38	10	11	17	44	67	−23	41
17	Huércal	38	6	13	19	33	73	−40	31
18	Juventud Torremolinos (R)	38	6	12	20	32	67	−35	30
19	Alhaurín Torre (R)	38	5	8	25	30	80	−50	23
20	Comarca Níjar (R)	38	5	8	25	26	75	−49	23

(C) Champions; (P) Promoted; (R) Relegated

Top goalscorer

Goalscorers	Goals	Team
(Spain) Emilio Guerra	25	Atlético Malagueño
(Spain) Pedro Pérez	22	Granada B
(Spain) Rafa Payán	17	Maracena
(Argentina) Pibe	17	Marbella
(Spain) José María Carrillo	17	Atlético Mancha Real

Top goalkeeper

Goalkeeper	Goals	Matches	Average	Team
(Spain) Emilio Muñoz	23	36	0.64	Atlético Mancha Real

=== Group X - Western Andalusia and Ceuta ===
Pos	Team	Pld	W	D	L	GF	GA	GD	Pts
1	Algeciras (C, P)	38	21	13	4	65	27	+38	76
2	Córdoba B	38	21	12	5	59	22	+37	75
3	Coria	38	19	11	8	64	37	+27	68
4	Mairena	38	17	14	7	47	28	+19	65
5	Atlético Ceuta	38	18	9	11	63	38	+25	63
6	Cabecense	38	14	17	7	52	35	+17	59
7	Alcalá	38	16	10	12	49	39	+10	58
8	San Roque	38	15	8	15	47	56	−9	53
9	Recreativo B	38	14	8	16	57	57	0	50
10	Racing Portuense	38	11	16	11	36	35	+1	49
11	Cádiz B	38	12	11	15	36	47	−11	47
12	Conil	38	11	12	15	46	56	−10	45
13	Sevilla C	38	10	14	14	40	46	−6	44
14	San Juan	38	10	13	15	35	44	−9	43
15	Pozoblanco	38	10	11	17	30	50	−20	41
16	Arcos	38	11	8	19	37	59	−22	41
17	Ayamonte	38	11	7	20	35	61	−26	40
18	Antoniano (R)	38	9	13	16	34	51	−17	40
19	Los Barrios (R)	38	9	11	18	30	55	−25	38
20	Montilla (R)	38	9	6	23	37	56	−19	33

(C) Champions; (P) Promoted; (R) Relegated

Top goalscorer

Goalscorers	Goals	Team
(Spain) Francis Ferrón	17	Recreativo B
(Spain) Javi López	16	Córdoba B
(Spain) Antonio Sánchez	16	Sevilla C
(Spain) Ito	15	Montilla
(Spain) José Antonio Prieto	14	Atlético Ceuta

Top goalkeeper

Goalkeeper	Goals	Matches	Average	Team
(Spain) Antonio Sillero	18	33	0.55	Córdoba B

=== Group XI - Balearic Islands ===
Pos	Team	Pld	W	D	L	GF	GA	GD	Pts
1	Santa Eulàlia (C)	38	26	6	6	69	30	+39	84
2	Poblense	38	22	6	10	53	29	+24	72
3	Formentera	38	19	11	8	62	28	+34	68
4	Alcúdia	38	19	9	10	48	28	+20	66
5	Campos	38	17	14	7	37	23	+14	65
6	Manacor	38	17	7	14	49	48	+1	58
7	Sant Rafel	38	14	13	11	48	37	+11	55
8	Llosetense	38	14	13	11	57	48	+9	55
9	Ciutadella	38	14	11	13	48	38	+10	53
10	Collerense	38	13	12	13	38	41	−3	51
11	Ferriolense	38	14	9	15	53	49	+4	51
12	Mercadal	38	13	11	14	39	54	−15	50
13	Montuïri	38	12	13	13	40	38	+2	49
14	Santanyí	38	11	13	14	49	54	−5	46
15	Felanitx	38	11	11	16	39	49	−10	44
16	Atlético Isleño (R)	38	10	13	15	39	45	−6	43
17	Andratx (R)	38	11	10	17	53	61	−8	40 (Note: Team deducted 3 points due to a non-appearance)
18	Espanya (R)	38	9	13	16	38	49	−11	40
19	Sóller (R)	38	8	12	18	49	63	−14	36
20	Son Ferrer (R)	38	1	3	34	20	116	−96	6

(C) Champions; (R) Relegated
Notes:

Top goalscorer

Goalscorers	Goals	Team
(Spain) Diego Piquero	22	Santa Eulàlia
(Spain) Adrián Ramos	18	San Rafael
(Spain) Kiko Diego	18	Santanyí
(Spain) Manuel Salinas	14	San Rafael
(Senegal) Winde Samb	13	Formentera

Top goalkeeper

Goalkeeper	Goals	Matches	Average	Team
(Spain) Toni Mas	22	37	0.59	Campos

=== Group XII - Canary Islands ===
Pos	Team	Pld	W	D	L	GF	GA	GD	Pts
1	Las Palmas Atlético (C, P)	38	26	7	5	90	27	+63	85
2	Granadilla	38	24	8	6	64	33	+31	80
3	Estrella	38	24	5	9	66	30	+36	77
4	Unión Viera	38	22	9	7	82	49	+33	75
5	Mensajero	38	22	8	8	80	37	+43	74
6	Tenerife B	38	17	12	9	63	40	+23	63
7	Vecindario	38	16	12	10	49	38	+11	60
8	Corralejo	38	16	8	14	43	41	+2	56
9	Las Zocas	38	16	8	14	42	56	−14	56
10	Villa Santa Brígida	38	16	6	16	55	59	−4	54
11	Telde	38	15	9	14	47	56	−9	54
12	Ibarra	38	15	7	16	50	45	+5	52
13	Tenisca	38	14	9	15	46	65	−19	51
14	Lanzarote	38	13	10	15	59	58	+1	49
15	Atlético Victoria	38	13	6	19	41	49	−8	45
16	Vera	38	12	6	20	43	75	−32	42
17	San Isidro	38	8	9	21	41	57	−16	33
18	Tijarafe (R)	38	5	3	30	31	92	−61	15 (Note: Team deducted 3 points due to a 2nd half non-appearance)
19	Gomera (R)	38	3	5	30	30	95	−65	14
20	San Pedro Mártir (D)	38	5	9	24	21	41	−20	0 (Note: Team withdrawn from the competition)

(C) Champions; (D) Disqualified; (P) Promoted; (R) Relegated
Notes:

Top goalscorer

Goalscorers	Goals	Team
(Spain) Yeray Pérez	22	Mensajero
(Spain) Borja Martín	22	Mensajero
(Spain) Rosmen Quevedo	21	Lanzarote
(Spain) Cristian Herrera	19	Las Palmas Atlético
(Spain) Héctor Figueroa	17	Las Palmas Atlético

Top goalkeeper

Goalkeeper	Goals	Matches	Average	Team
(Spain) Ione Puga	30	37	0.81	Estrella

=== Group XIII - Region of Murcia ===
Pos	Team	Pld	W	D	L	GF	GA	GD	Pts
1	La Hoya Lorca (C, P)	34	26	3	5	91	25	+66	81
2	Cieza	34	22	4	8	59	27	+32	70
3	Mar Menor	34	22	3	9	64	30	+34	69
4	Jumilla	34	21	4	9	66	35	+31	67
5	Minera	34	17	7	10	43	32	+11	58
6	Plus Ultra	34	16	10	8	47	29	+18	58
7	Real Murcia Imperial	34	14	8	12	32	35	−3	50
8	Molina	34	13	10	11	41	42	−1	49
9	Atlético Pulpileño	34	11	13	10	41	41	0	46
10	Estrella Grana	34	11	12	11	47	48	−1	45
11	Bullense	34	9	14	11	36	43	−7	41
12	Águilas	34	11	7	16	41	42	−1	40
13	Olímpico Totana	34	11	6	17	46	63	−17	39
14	El Castillo	34	9	9	16	40	53	−13	36
15	Fortuna	34	8	10	16	30	53	−23	34
16	Bala Azul (R)	34	7	10	17	34	67	−33	31
17	Beniel (R)	34	4	6	24	30	82	−52	18
18	Pinatar (R)	34	2	8	24	27	68	−41	14

(C) Champions; (P) Promoted; (R) Relegated

Top goalscorer

Goalscorers	Goals	Team
(Spain) Juanfran Iniesta	19	Mar Menor
(Spain) Ginés Meca	17	La Hoya
(Spain) David Karanka	17	Cieza
(Spain) Antonio Miñán	16	Pulpileño
(Argentina) Nico Fernández	15	La Hoya

Top goalkeeper

Goalkeeper	Goals	Matches	Average	Team
(Spain) Miguel Navarro	20	29	0.69	La Hoya

=== Group XIV - Extremadura ===
Pos	Team	Pld	W	D	L	GF	GA	GD	Pts
1	Extremadura (C)	38	27	8	3	75	14	+61	89
2	UD Badajoz	38	24	8	6	67	24	+43	80
3	Don Benito	38	23	10	5	55	23	+32	79
4	Díter Zafra	38	22	11	5	57	23	+34	77
5	Jerez	38	16	11	11	51	37	+14	59
6	Mérida	38	15	11	12	47	38	+9	56
7	Ciudad Plasencia	38	15	10	13	50	38	+12	55
8	Plasencia	38	15	10	13	55	47	+8	55
9	Santa Amalia	38	15	8	15	52	54	−2	53
10	Coria	38	14	9	15	47	48	−1	51
11	Atlético San José	38	14	6	18	44	58	−14	48
12	Pueblonuevo	38	11	10	17	41	60	−19	43
13	Miajadas	38	12	7	19	40	56	−16	43
14	Valverdeño	38	11	9	18	40	56	−16	42
15	Hernán Cortés	38	11	8	19	36	64	−28	41
16	Cacereño B	38	10	10	18	48	57	−9	40
17	Fuente Cantos (R)	38	10	9	19	42	68	−26	39
18	Moralo (R)	38	7	17	14	33	52	−19	38
19	Emérita Augusta (R)	38	8	7	23	44	77	−33	31
20	Valdelacalzada (R)	38	7	7	24	35	65	−30	28

(C) Champions; (R) Relegated

Top goalscorer

Goalscorers	Goals	Team
(Spain) David Alejo	23	Ciudad Plasencia
(Spain) Ángel Ordóñez	18	Atlético San José
(Spain) Luismi Álvarez	17	Plasencia
(Spain) Juan Germán Moreno	16	Díter Zafra
(Spain) Sergio Sánchez	16	Plasencia

Top goalkeeper

Goalkeeper	Goals	Matches	Average	Team
(Spain) Tete Martínez	12	32	0.38	Extremadura

=== Group XV - Navarra ===
Pos	Team	Pld	W	D	L	GF	GA	GD	Pts
1	San Juan (C)	38	23	11	4	53	16	+37	80
2	Mutilvera	38	23	9	6	78	28	+50	78
3	Iruña	38	19	10	9	67	45	+22	67
4	Cortes	38	19	9	10	50	41	+9	66
5	Cirbonero	38	18	11	9	71	41	+30	65
6	Chantrea	38	18	11	9	51	31	+20	65
7	Huarte	38	16	10	12	58	49	+9	58
8	Burladés	38	15	10	13	47	38	+9	55
9	Oberena	38	17	4	17	51	53	−2	55
10	Murchante	38	14	13	11	39	39	0	55
11	Valle de Egüés	38	14	7	17	52	51	+1	49
12	Pamplona	38	13	9	16	45	48	−3	48
13	Erriberri	38	12	10	16	43	52	−9	46
14	Lagun Artea	38	12	9	17	34	48	−14	45
15	Valtierrano	38	11	10	17	42	52	−10	43
16	Idoya (R)	38	10	11	17	34	55	−21	41
17	Aoiz (R)	38	10	9	19	42	63	−21	39
18	Subiza (R)	38	9	11	18	51	77	−26	38
19	Peña Azagresa (R)	38	6	12	20	41	69	−28	30
20	Lagunak (R)	38	3	10	25	20	73	−53	19

(C) Champions; (R) Relegated

Top goalscorer

Goalscorers	Goals	Team
(Spain) Isaac Sanz	21	Cirbonero
(Spain) Eloy Capapay	18	Huarte
(Spain) Miguel Maeztu	17	Valterriano
(Spain) Carlos Mena	16	Cirbonero
(Spain) Mikel Gómez	15	Iruña

Top goalkeeper

Goalkeeper	Goals	Matches	Average	Team
(Spain) Iván Contreras	20	27	0.74	Mutilvera

=== Group XVI - La Rioja ===
Pos	Team	Pld	W	D	L	GF	GA	GD	Pts
1	Haro (C)	38	29	8	1	100	13	+87	95
2	Alfaro	38	29	4	5	95	21	+74	91
3	Calahorra	38	25	7	6	66	26	+40	82
4	Varea	38	25	5	8	94	40	+54	80
5	Oyonesa	38	22	10	6	53	23	+30	76
6	Náxara	38	22	8	8	63	35	+28	74
7	Arnedo	38	19	6	13	53	41	+12	63
8	Vianés	38	18	8	12	62	44	+18	62
9	Calasancio	38	15	11	12	32	41	−9	56
10	Anguiano	38	14	13	11	59	49	+10	55
11	Agoncillo	38	15	9	14	48	50	−2	54
12	River Ebro	38	14	6	18	51	53	−2	48
13	Berceo	38	9	7	22	44	65	−21	34
14	San Marcial	38	10	4	24	38	82	−44	34
15	La Calzada	38	8	9	21	41	67	−26	33
16	Villegas	38	9	4	25	44	82	−38	31
17	Pradejón	38	6	13	19	40	71	−31	31
18	Yagüe (R)	38	6	7	25	39	82	−43	25
19	Rapid Murillo (R)	38	6	5	27	26	87	−61	23
20	Aldeano (R)	38	3	8	27	21	97	−76	17

(C) Champions; (R) Relegated

Top goalscorer

Goalscorers	Goals	Team
(Spain) Omar Chamadoira	27	Alfaro
(Spain) Carmelo Sota	22	Varea
(Spain) Joseba del Campo	21	Anguiano
(Spain) Chimbo	19	Varea
(Spain) Israel Losa	18	Alfaro

Top goalkeeper

Goalkeeper	Goals	Matches	Average	Team
(Spain) Javi Pérez	11	28	0.39	Haro

=== Group XVII - Aragón ===
Pos	Team	Pld	W	D	L	GF	GA	GD	Pts
1	Sariñena (C, P)	38	24	12	2	71	21	+50	84
2	Andorra	38	24	12	2	73	27	+46	84
3	Ebro	38	21	10	7	66	40	+26	73
4	Utebo	38	21	9	8	56	26	+30	72
5	Monzón	38	22	4	12	71	51	+20	70
6	Ejea	38	17	11	10	59	40	+19	62
7	Borja	38	15	12	11	46	39	+7	57
8	Tarazona	38	15	8	15	45	45	0	53
9	Cuarte Industrial	38	14	11	13	51	47	+4	53
10	Villanueva	38	15	7	16	47	48	−1	52
11	Oliver	38	12	12	14	45	49	−4	48
12	Sabiñánigo	38	14	5	19	53	53	0	47
13	Escalerillas	38	12	9	17	36	53	−17	45
14	Calatayud	38	14	2	22	37	52	−15	44
15	Barbastro	38	11	10	17	45	59	−14	43
16	Almudévar	38	12	9	17	46	48	−2	42 (Note: Team deducted 3 points due to an illegal coach)
17	La Almunia (R)	38	11	7	20	39	58	−19	40
18	Valdefierro (R)	38	10	9	19	38	50	−12	39
19	Robres (R)	38	7	9	22	41	63	−22	30
20	Binéfar (R)	38	5	0	33	20	116	−96	12 (Note: Team deducted 3 points due to a non-appearance)

(C) Champions; (P) Promoted; (R) Relegated
Notes:

Top goalscorer

Goalscorers	Goals	Team
(Spain) Paco del Moral	21	Monzón
(Spain) Adrián Barba	20	Andorra
(Spain) Víctor Arribas	19	Ebro
(Spain) Antonio Gabarre	18	Almudévar
(Spain) Adán Pérez	17	Andorra

Top goalkeeper

Goalkeeper	Goals	Matches	Average	Team
(Spain) Joaquín Moso	21	37	0.57	Sariñena

=== Group XVIII - Castilla-La Mancha ===
Pos	Team	Pld	W	D	L	GF	GA	GD	Pts
1	Toledo (C, P)	38	24	11	3	74	33	+41	83
2	Conquense (P)	38	21	8	9	58	29	+29	71
3	Azuqueca	38	20	9	9	58	45	+13	69
4	Talavera Reina	38	18	13	7	52	31	+21	67
5	Hellín	38	18	11	9	45	24	+21	65
6	Villarrobledo	38	17	11	10	63	43	+20	62
7	Alcázar	38	17	9	12	42	40	+2	60
8	Puertollano	38	13	14	11	44	31	+13	53
9	Quintanar Rey	38	13	11	14	54	54	0	50
10	Albacete B	38	12	13	13	47	45	+2	49
11	Illescas	38	12	12	14	49	52	−3	48
12	Almansa	38	13	9	16	43	54	−11	48
13	Manzanares	38	11	15	12	36	40	−4	48
14	Villarrubia	38	11	10	17	39	54	−15	43
15	Madridejos	38	9	14	15	41	52	−11	41
16	Mora	38	10	9	19	45	54	−9	39
17	Ciudad Real	38	8	11	19	37	60	−23	35
18	Marchamalo (R)	38	9	8	21	45	59	−14	35
19	Torrijos (R)	38	6	15	17	29	64	−35	33
20	Talavera (R)	38	9	5	24	39	76	−37	32

(C) Champions; (P) Promoted; (R) Relegated

Top goalscorer

Goalscorers	Goals	Team
(Spain) Francisco Grande	19	Albacete B
(Spain) Rufino Segovia	18	Toledo
(Spain) Rubén Moreno	18	Talavera Reina
(Spain) Alfonso Rivera	17	Toledo
(Spain) Daoiz de la Plata	16	Marchamalo

Top goalkeeper

Goalkeeper	Goals	Matches	Average	Team
(Spain) Toni Bernal	24	38	0.63	Hellín

== Promotion play-offs ==
=== Group winners promotion play-off ===
Promoted to Segunda División B
Racing de Ferrol (3 years later)	Sariñena (First time ever )	Puerta Bonita (First time ever)	La Hoya Lorca (First time ever)	Las Palmas Atlético (4 years later)	Algeciras (5 years later)	Elche Ilicitano (First time ever)	Burgos (1 year later)	Toledo (1 year later)

=== Non-champions promotion play-off ===
Promoted to Segunda División B
Laudio (First time ever)	Celta B (1 year later)	Olot (First time ever)	Conquense (1 year later)	El Palo (First time ever)	Cultural Leonesa (2 years later)	Tropezón (12 years later)	Compostela (3 years later)	Granada B (First time ever)
