= Curro (footballer, born 1981) =

Spanish footballer

Personal information
- Full name: Antonio José González García
- Date of birth: 27 November 1981 (age 44)
- Place of birth: Santa Amalia, Spain
- Height: 1.80 m (5 ft 11 in)
- Position: Midfielder

Team information
- Current team: Don Benito

Youth career
- Extremadura

Senior career*
Years	Team	Apps	(Gls)
1999–2002	Extremadura B		
2001	Extremadura	0	(0)
2002–2003	Don Benito		
2003	Elche B		
2003–2004	Santa Amalia		
2004–2005	Díter Zafra	36	(12)
2005–2006	Las Palmas	37	(2)
2006–2007	Villanueva	30	(7)
2007–2010	Oviedo	107	(21)
2010–2011	Cultural Leonesa	19	(0)
2011–2012	Badajoz	42	(4)
2012–2017	Extremadura	151	(43)
2017	Santa Amalia		
2017–	Don Benito		
- * Club domestic league appearances and goals

Antonio José González García (born 27 November 1981), commonly known as Curro, is a Spanish footballer who plays for Don Benito as a midfielder.

== Club career ==
Born in Santa Amalia, Badajoz, Extremadura, Curro represented CF Extremadura as a youth. After spending several years with the reserves, he made his first team debut on 10 October 2001, coming on as an extra-time substitute for goalscorer Pedro José in a 1–1 Copa del Rey home draw against CD Badajoz (2–4 loss on penalties).

Curro left the club in 2002, and subsequently joined CD Don Benito in Tercera División. He continued to appear in the category but also in Segunda División B in the following years, representing Elche CF Ilicitano, CD Santa Amalia, CD Díter Zafra, UD Las Palmas, CD Villanueva, Real Oviedo, Cultural Leonesa, Badajoz and Extremadura UD.
