= Verdú (surname) =

Verdú is a surname. Notable people with the surname include:

- David Verdú (born 1988), Spanish footballer
- Joan Verdú (born 1983), Spanish footballer
- José María Sánchez-Verdú (born 1968), Spanish composer
- Juan Bautista Verdú (1938–2009), Spanish footballer
- Maribel Verdú (born 1970), Spanish actor
- Sergio Verdú (born 1958), Spanish academic
- Vicente Verdú (born 1942), Spanish writer, journalist and economist
