= Joseba Agirre =

Joseba Agirre may refer to:

- Joseba Agirre (footballer, born 1964), Spanish footballer
- Joseba Agirre (footballer, born 1977), Spanish footballer
