= Yeray Patiño =

Spanish footballer

Yeray
Personal information
- Full name: Yeray Patiño Blasco
- Date of birth: 19 May 1991 (age 35)
- Place of birth: Elche, Spain
- Height: 1.77 m (5 ft 10 in)
- Position: Midfielder

Team information
- Current team: Lincoln Red Imps

Youth career
- 2002–2010: Elche

Senior career*
Years	Team	Apps	(Gls)
2010–2014	Elche B	121	(15)
2012	Elche	1	(0)
2014–2015	La Nucía	39	(6)
2015–	Lincoln Red Imps	0	(0)
- * Club domestic league appearances and goals as of 16 May 2015

Yeray Patiño Blasco (born 19 May 1991), simply known as Yeray, is a Spanish footballer who plays for the Gibraltarian club Lincoln Red Imps F.C. as a midfielder.

== Football career ==
Born in Elche, Alicante, Valencian Community, Yeray was a product of Elche CF's youth system and played his first senior games with the reserves in the 2010–11 season. On 16 May 2012, he made his professional debut, playing the last 15 minutes of a 1–3 away loss against AD Alcorcón in the Segunda División championship. He finished the 2012–13 season scoring 14 goals (3 only in promotion play-offs) in 41 appearances with the B-side, being promoted to Segunda División B.

In July 2013, after lengthy negotiations, Yeray signed a new two-year deal with the Valencians. He rescinded his link on 16 July in the following year, and subsequently joined CF La Nucía in Tercera División.

On 23 August 2015, Yeray moved to the Gibraltarian club Lincoln Red Imps F.C.
