= Óscar Prats =

Spanish footballer

Personal information
- Full name: Óscar Prats Català
- Date of birth: 25 March 1989 (age 37)
- Place of birth: Llutxent, Spain
- Height: 1.77 m (5 ft 10 in)
- Position: Right back

Team information
- Current team: La Nucía
- Number: 2

Youth career
- Real Madrid

Senior career*
Years	Team	Apps	(Gls)
- Villarreal C
2008–2011	Villarreal B	1	(0)
2010–2011	→ Cacereño (loan)	18	(0)
2011–2012	Roquetas	33	(0)
2012–2014	Alzira	2	(0)
2014–2018	Talavera	139	(2)
2018–2019	Barakaldo	35	(0)
2019–2020	Cornellà	13	(0)
2020–	La Nucía	6	(0)
- * Club domestic league appearances and goals as of 14:01, 18 September 2020 (UTC)

Óscar Prats Català (born 25 March 1989) is a Spanish professional footballer who plays for CF La Nucía as a right back.

== Career ==
Born in Llutxent, Prats graduated from the youth academy of Real Madrid. He started his senior career with the reserves of Villarreal, initially with the Villarreal CF C before being promoted to the B team in 2008. His only appearance for the latter came in 2010, featuring in a 1–2 defeat against Salamanca in the Segunda División. On 27 August 2010, he was loaned off to Segunda División B side CP Cacereño for a year.

On 21 July 2011, Prats signed with CD Roquetas of the same tier. In the only season he played with the club, he managed to make 33 appearances. In the following two seasons, he represented UD Alzira which competed in the Tercera División.

On 12 July 2014, Prats signed for CF Talavera de la Reina, becoming the club's sixth signing of the season. He was ruled out of play for two weeks in November 2015 after being elbowed by a La Roda CF player which broke the bones of his nose. On 8 June 2018, he switched to Barakaldo CF.

== Career statistics ==
As of match played on 1 September 2018

Club	Season	League			Cup		Other		Total	
Club	Season	Division	Apps	Goals	Apps	Goals	Apps	Goals	Apps	Goals
Villarreal	2008–09	Segunda División B	0	0	—		1 (Note: Appearances in Promotion Play-offs)	0	1	0
Villarreal	2009–10	Segunda División	1	0	—		—		1	0
Villarreal	Total		1	0	—		1	0	2	0
Cacereño (loan)	2010–11	Segunda División B	18	0	0	0	—		18	0
Roquetas	2011–12	Segunda División B	33	0	1	0	—		34	0
Alzira	2012–13	Tercera División	0	0	0	0	5	0	5	0
Alzira	2013–14	Tercera División	2	0	0	0	5	0	7	0
Alzira	Total		2	0	0	0	10	0	12	0
Talavera	2014–15	Tercera División	35	1	0	0	2	0	37	1
Talavera	2015–16	Segunda División B	30	0	2	0	—		32	0
Talavera	2016–17	Tercera División	38	0	0	0	2	0	40	0
Talavera	2017–18	Segunda División B	36	1	3	0	—		39	1
Talavera	Total		139	2	5	0	4	0	148	2
Barakaldo	2018–19	Segunda División B	1	0	0	0	—		1	0
Career total			194	2	6	0	15	0	215	2
