= Patri (footballer) =

Spanish footballer and manager

Personal information
- Full name: Patricio Moreno Ruiz
- Date of birth: 21 March 1977 (age 49)
- Place of birth: Don Benito, Spain
- Height: 1.83 m (6 ft 0 in)
- Position: Midfielder

Team information
- Current team: Getafe (assistant)

Youth career
- Don Benito

Senior career*
Years	Team	Apps	(Gls)
1997–1998	Don Benito		
1998–2000	Extremadura B		
2000–2002	Alicante	33+	(7+)
2002–2004	Poli Ejido	37	(0)
2004–2006	Hércules	33	(0)
2006–2007	Águilas	35	(8)
2007–2009	Alcoyano	68	(7)
2009–2010	Elche	13	(0)
2010–2011	Cerro Reyes	18	(3)
2011	La Muela	11	(1)
2011–2017	Don Benito		
Total		248	(26)

Managerial career
- 2017–2019: Don Benito (assistant)
- 2019–2021: Getafe (assistant)
- 2021–: Valencia (assistant)
- * Club domestic league appearances and goals

Patricio Moreno Ruiz (born 21 March 1977), commonly known as Patri, is a Spanish retired footballer who played as a midfielder, and is the currently assistant coach of La Liga club Getafe.

== Career ==
Born in Don Benito, Badajoz, Extremadura, Patri started his career with hometown side CD Don Benito. After representing CF Extremadura's reserves, he joined Tercera División's Alicante CF in 2000, achieving immediate promotion and being an undisputed starter as his side finished sixth in the 2001–02 Segunda División B.

Patri signed for Segunda División side Polideportivo Ejido in 2002, and made his professional debut on 1 September of that year by starting in a 0–0 away draw against SD Eibar. After two seasons at the club, he moved to Hércules CF in the third division, helping the side achieve promotion but being rarely used afterwards.

Patri was a regular starter in his following two clubs, Águilas CF (where he scored a career-best eight goals) and CD Alcoyano, before returning to the second division with Elche CF. Again rarely used (only four starts, 363 minutes of action), he went on to resume his career in the lower leagues, representing AD Cerro de Reyes and CD La Muela during the 2010–11 campaign, with both clubs folding until the end of it.

In 2011, Patri returned to Don Benito, where he retired in March 2017 at the age of nearly 40. He immediately started working as Juancho Pozo's assistant at the very same club.

On 8 August 2019, Patri was appointed José Bordalás' assistant at La Liga club Getafe CF.
