= David Agudo =

Spanish footballer

Personal information
- Full name: David Agudo Pérez
- Date of birth: 12 November 1988 (age 37)
- Place of birth: Lobón, Spain
- Height: 1.78 m (5 ft 10 in)
- Position: Forward

Team information
- Current team: Ciudad de Lucena

Senior career*
Years	Team	Apps	(Gls)
2007–2008	Valdelcalzada		
2008–2009	Badajoz		
2009–2010	Lucena	28	(6)
2010–2012	Betis B	67	(16)
2012–2013	San Roque	20	(7)
2013	Atlético Baleares	15	(0)
2013–2014	Reus	30	(6)
2014–2015	Huracán	26	(2)
2015–2016	Talavera	37	(8)
2016–2017	Extremadura	18	(2)
2017	Melilla	12	(0)
2017–2018	Kapfenberger SV	28	(0)
2018–2022	Don Benito	116	(23)
2022–2023	Socuéllamos	16	(4)
2023	Xerez Deportivo	18	(2)
2023–2024	Villanovense	26	(0)
2024–	Ciudad de Lucena	4	(1)
- * Club domestic league appearances and goals as of 13 October 2024

David Agudo Pérez (born 12 November 1988) is a Spanish footballer who plays for Ciudad de Lucena.

== Club career ==
He made his Austrian Football First League debut for Kapfenberger SV on 21 July 2017 in a game against FC Liefering.
