= Víctor Díaz (footballer, born 1991) =

Spanish footballer

Personal information
- Full name: Víctor Díaz Suárez
- Date of birth: 29 March 1991 (age 35)
- Place of birth: León, Spain
- Height: 1.78 m (5 ft 10 in)
- Position: Winger

Team information
- Current team: Avilés Industrial
- Number: 3

Youth career
- Cultural Leonesa

Senior career*
Years	Team	Apps	(Gls)
2007–2010	Júpiter Leonés	80	(11)
2008–2011	Cultural Leonesa	18	(0)
2011–2013	Deportivo B	53	(13)
2013–2019	Cultural Leonesa	169	(11)
2019–2022	UCAM Murcia	50	(1)
2022–2024	Atlético Sanluqueño	52	(4)
2024–	Avilés Industrial	36	(0)
- * Club domestic league appearances and goals as of 9 June 2026

Víctor Díaz Suárez (born 29 March 1991), commonly known as Viti, is a Spanish professional footballer who plays for Avilés Industrial. Mainly a left winger, he can also play as a left back.

== Club career ==
Díaz was born in León, and finished his formation with hometown club Cultural y Deportiva Leonesa. He made his senior debut with the farm team during the 2007–08 season, in Tercera División.

Díaz made his first team debut on 11 May 2008 at the age of just 17, starting in a 0–1 Segunda División B home loss against SD Lemona. However, he would only feature regularly for the B-side in the following campaigns.

On 20 July 2011 Díaz joined another reserve team, Deportivo de La Coruña B in the fourth division. On 30 July 2013 he returned to Cultu, after scoring a career-best nine goals during the 2012–13 season.

On 6 June 2016, Díaz signed a new two-year deal, running until 2018. He contributed with 29 appearances (play-offs included) and three goals as his side achieved promotion to Segunda División after a 42-year absence.

Díaz made his professional debut on 18 August 2017, starting in a 0–2 away loss against Lorca FC.

On 9 July 2024, Díaz signed with Avilés Industrial in the fourth tier.

== Honours ==
Cultural Leonesa

- Segunda División B: 2016–17
