= Borja Cantarutti =

Spanish footballer (born 1983)

Personal information
- Date of birth: 14 September 1983 (age 43)
- Place of birth: Málaga, Spain
- Position: Forward

Youth career
- –2002: Atlético Madrid

Senior career*
Years	Team	Apps	(Gls)
2002–2003	Livingston	0	(0)
2003–2004	Getafe		
2004–2005	Elche		
2005–2006	Polideportivo Ejido		
2006–2007	CP Cacereño		
2007–2008	Alcobendas		
2008	Benidorm		
2008–2011	CD Ciudad de Vícar		
2011	Crevillente Deportivo		
2011–2012	Polideportivo Ejido		
2012	UD Almansa		
2012	Racing Cartagena Mar Menor		
2012–2013	Pinatar CF		
2013	Jumilla		
2013–2014	Fortuna		
2014–2015	Racing Cartagena Mar Menor		
2015–2016	CD Minera		
2016–2017	Águilas		
2017	CD Cieza		
2017–2018	Águilas		
2018	Estudiantes		
2018–2019	Mazarrón		
2019	Estudiantes		
2020–2021	Algeciras		
- * Club domestic league appearances and goals as of 17:00, 5 November 2022 (UTC)

Borja Cantarutti (born 14 September 1983) is a former Spanish professional footballer who played as a forward.

== Club career ==
Cantarutti started his career in the youth academy of Atlético Madrid.

In 2002, Cantarutti signed for Scottish side Livingston. However, he left the club after one season without having made a single first team appearance.

Cantarutti went on to play for 20 clubs in Spain before retiring in 2021.
