= Daniel Hedrera =

Spanish footballer

Dani Hedrera
Personal information
- Full name: Daniel Hedrera Lobatón
- Date of birth: 15 August 1983 (age 43)
- Place of birth: Jerez de la Frontera, Spain
- Height: 1.86 m (6 ft 1 in)
- Position: Centre back

Team information
- Current team: Racing Portuense (assistant coach)

Youth career
- Xerez

Senior career*
Years	Team	Apps	(Gls)
2001–2002	Xerez B		
2001–2003	Xerez	16	(0)
2002–2003	→ Alcorcón (loan)	21	(1)
2003–2005	Real Madrid B	14	(1)
2004–2005	→ Alcorcón (loan)	29	(0)
2005–2006	Pontevedra	2	(0)
2006–2007	Zamora	35	(1)
2007–2008	Mazarrón	30	(0)
2008–2010	Oviedo	51	(0)
2010–2011	Poli Ejido	22	(0)
2011–2014	Cultural Leonesa	90	(3)
2014–2015	Lealtad	30	(0)
2015–2016	Arroyo	26	(5)
2016–2017	Algeciras	34	(1)
2017–2018	Xerez	16	(0)
2018–2019	Los Barrios	48	(1)
2019–2020	Rota	23	(2)

Managerial career
- 2022: Veteranos Xerez
- 2023–2024: Comarca de Jerez
- 2024–2025: Trebujena CF
- 2025–: Racing Portuense (assistant)
- * Club domestic league appearances and goals

Daniel 'Dani' Hedrera Lobatón (born 15 August 1983) is a Spanish football coach and a former central defender who is an assistant coach with Racing Portuense.

== Club career ==
Born in Jerez de la Frontera, Andalusia, Hedrera started playing youth football with Xerez CD. In the 2001–02 season he made his senior debuts, appearing with the reserves in the regional leagues; on 27 October 2001 he played his first game as a professional, starting in a 2–0 home win against Elche CF in the Segunda División championship, and he eventually started in all of his first-team appearances during the campaign, as the club finished just three points shy of a La Liga promotion.

Hedrera then joined AD Alcorcón on loan in the 2002 summer, and went on to resume his career in Segunda División B and also Tercera División, representing Real Madrid Castilla, Alcorcón, Pontevedra CF, Zamora CF, Mazarrón CF, Real Oviedo, Polideportivo Ejido and Cultural y Deportiva Leonesa.
