= Ángel Ortega =

Spanish footballer

Personal information
- Full name: Ángel Ortega García
- Date of birth: 20 November 1989 (age 36)
- Place of birth: Valencia, Spain
- Height: 1.79 m (5 ft 10 in)
- Position: Right back

Team information
- Current team: Recambios Colón

Youth career
- Don Bosco
- Villarreal

Senior career*
Years	Team	Apps	(Gls)
2008–2010	Villarreal C	52	(2)
2009–2012	Villarreal B	21	(0)
2012	Eibar	12	(0)
2012–2013	Alzira	31	(0)
2013–2014	Ontinyent	35	(1)
2014–2015	Acero	5	(0)
2015	Ontinyent	21	(0)
2015–2016	Eldense	36	(0)
2016–2017	Saguntino	13	(0)
2017	Ontinyent	14	(2)
2017–2024	Roda	152	(5)
2024–	Recambios Colón	37	(2)
- * Club domestic league appearances and goals as of 8 November 2025

Ángel Ortega García (born 20 November 1989) is a Spanish footballer who plays as a right back for Tercera Federación club Recambios Colón.
