= Raúl Caballero (footballer, born 1978) =

Spanish footballer

Personal information
- Full name: Raúl Caballero Cabrera
- Date of birth: 3 December 1978 (age 47)
- Place of birth: Badalona, Spain
- Height: 1.77 m (5 ft 9 1/2 in)
- Position: Forward

Youth career
- Viviendas Congreso
- 1985–1995: Damm
- 1995–1996: Barcelona

Senior career*
Years	Team	Apps	(Gls)
1996–1997	Barcelona C		
1997–1999	Barcelona B	39	(4)
1999–2001	Villarreal	7	(0)
2000	→ Cartagonova (loan)	15	(7)
2000–2001	→ Onda (loan)		(19)
2001	→ Elche (loan)	0	(0)
2001–2002	Lleida	34	(11)
2002–2004	Gramenet	70	(26)
2004–2005	Girona	36	(7)
2005–2006	Badalona	35	(5)
2006–2007	Alicante	12	(2)
2007–2008	Talavera	31	(12)
2008	L'Hospitalet	6	(0)
2008–2009	Onda		
2010–2014	Borriol		
2014–2016	San Pedro		
2017	Onda	7	(1)
- * Club domestic league appearances and goals

Raúl Caballero Cabrera (born 3 December 1978) is a Spanish retired footballer who played as a forward.

He previously played for Barcelona B and Villarreal in the Segunda División and for numerous teams at a lower level.
