= Joseba Agirre (footballer, born 1977) =

Spanish footballer

Personal information
- Full name: Joseba Agirre Oliden
- Date of birth: 24 March 1977 (age 49)
- Place of birth: Orio, Spain
- Height: 1.76 m (5 ft 9 in)
- Position: Midfielder

Youth career
- Real Sociedad

Senior career*
Years	Team	Apps	(Gls)
1995–1998	Real Sociedad B	101	(8)
1996	Real Sociedad	1	(0)
1998–2002	Castellón	128	(4)
2002–2003	Hospitalet	22	(0)
2003	Ciudad Murcia	0	(0)
2003–2004	Toledo	33	(1)
2004–2010	Real Unión	146	(5)
2010–2014	Laudio	136	(5)
Total		567	(23)
- * Club domestic league appearances and goals

Joseba Agirre Oliden (born 24 March 1977) is a Spanish former footballer who played as a midfielder.

== Club career ==
Born in Orio, Gipuzkoa, Agirre was a product of local Real Sociedad's youth system, and made his senior debut with the reserves in the 1995–96 season, in Segunda División B. On 25 May 1996 he appeared in his first and only game with the first team, playing the last 17 minutes of a 3–2 La Liga away win over Racing de Santander.

In summer 1998, Agirre joined CD Castellón also in the third division. Four years later he signed for fellow league club CE L'Hospitalet. After appearing with the Catalans in the 2002–03 regular season he competed with Ciudad de Murcia in the play-offs, helping to a first-ever promotion to Segunda División.

Agirre moved to CD Toledo, still in division three, for the 2003–04 campaign. Subsequently, he joined Real Unión also in the third tier, being first choice in his first four seasons and still contributing 16 matches in the fifth as the Basques returned to the second division after 44 years. He made only one competitive appearance in 2009–10, however, a 2–1 loss at RC Celta de Vigo in the Copa del Rey, and also saw his team be immediately relegated back.

In January 2010, Agirre joined CD Laudio from Tercera División. In July 2012 he renewed his contract with the club, and was also promoted to division three in 2013, appearing in 36 matches in the process.
