= Juan Guerra (footballer, born 1991) =

Spanish footballer

Personal information
- Full name: Juan José Navarro Guerra
- Date of birth: March 8, 1991 (age 35)
- Place of birth: Seville, Spain
- Height: 1.79 m (5 ft 10 1/2 in)
- Position: Midfielder

Team information
- Current team: Ejea

Youth career
- Sevilla

Senior career*
Years	Team	Apps	(Gls)
2009–2011	Sevilla C	38	(3)
2011–2012	Sevilla B	7	(0)
2012–2014	Córdoba B	63	(13)
2013–2014	Córdoba	2	(0)
2014–2015	Écija	39	(10)
2015–2016	Alcalá	11	(0)
2016–	Ejea	0	(0)

International career
2009	Spain U18	2	(0)
- * Club domestic league appearances and goals as of 15 May 2016

Juan José Navarro Guerra (born 8 March 1991) is a Spanish footballer who plays for SD Ejea as a central midfielder.

== Club career ==
Born in Seville, Andalusia, Guerra finished his graduation with local Sevilla FC, making his senior debuts with the C-team in the 2009–10 season, in Tercera División. After one and a half seasons he was promoted to the reserves in Segunda División B.

On 16 July 2012 Guerra signed with another reserve team, Córdoba CF B. On 24 November of the following year he made his first-team debut, playing the last 12 minutes of a 1–3 away loss against CD Mirandés in the Segunda División.
