= CF Extremadura B =

Spanish football club

Extremadura B
- Full name: Club de Fútbol Extremadura "B"
- Founded: 1958 (as CD Almendralejo); 1984 (refounded); 1991 (refounded)
- Dissolved: 2007
- Ground: Francisco de la Hera; Almendralejo, Extremadura, Spain
- Capacity: 11,580
- 2006–07: Tercera División – Group 14, 9th of 20
| Home colours | Away colours |

Club de Fútbol Extremadura "B" was a Spanish football team based in Badajoz, in the autonomous community of Extremadura. Founded in 1958, they were the reserve team of CF Extremadura, and played their last season in Tercera División – Group 14.

== History ==
Founded in 1958 as Club Deportivo Almendralejo, the club became a farm team of CF Extremadura in 1960, being renamed Club de Fútbol Extremadura B in the following year. In 1969, the club changed its name again, now to Club de Fútbol Extremadura Atlético.

In 1975, president Juan Navia Tolosa left Extremadura Atlético after having discrepancies with Extremadura, and the club later ceased activities. They played for two seasons in the 1980s before returning to action in 1994, now back as Extremadura B.

In 2007, after Extremadura's administrative relegation to the Regional Preferente, Extremadura B was dissolved.

== Season to season ==
| Season | Tier | Division | Place | Copa del Rey |
|---|---|---|---|---|
| 1959–60 | 4 | 1ª Reg. | 7th | |
| 1960–61 | 4 | 1ª Reg. | 4th | |
| 1961–62 | 4 | 1ª Reg. | 8th | |
| 1962–63 | 4 | 1ª Reg. | 11th | |
| 1963–64 | 4 | 1ª Reg. | 6th | |
| 1964–65 | 5 | 2ª Reg. | | |
| 1965–1969 | DNP | | | |
| 1969–70 | 4 | 1ª Reg. | 10th | |
| 1970–71 | 5 | 2ª Reg. P. | 8th | |
| 1971–72 | 5 | 2ª Reg. P. | 3rd | |
| 1972–73 | 5 | 2ª Reg. | 4th | |
| 1973–74 | 5 | 2ª Reg. | 4th | |
| 1974–75 | 5 | 1ª Reg. | 9th | |
| 1975–1984 | DNP | | | |
| 1984–85 | 6 | 1ª Reg. | 4th | |
| 1985–86 | 6 | 1ª Reg. | 4th | |

| Season | Tier | Division | Place |
|---|---|---|---|
| 1986–1994 | DNP | | |
| 1994–95 | 6 | 1ª Reg. | 3rd |
| 1995–96 | 6 | 1ª Reg. | 1st |
| 1996–97 | 5 | Reg. Pref. | 2nd |
| 1997–98 | 4 | 3ª | 7th |
| 1998–99 | 4 | 3ª | 5th |
| 1999–2000 | 4 | 3ª | 8th |
| 2000–01 | 4 | 3ª | 15th |
| 2001–02 | 4 | 3ª | 9th |
| 2002–03 | 4 | 3ª | 4th |
| 2003–04 | 4 | 3ª | 7th |
| 2004–05 | 4 | 3ª | 9th |
| 2005–06 | 4 | 3ª | 12th |
| 2006–07 | 4 | 3ª | 9th |

- 10 seasons in Tercera División
