= Fernando Carralero =

Spanish footballer (born 1986)

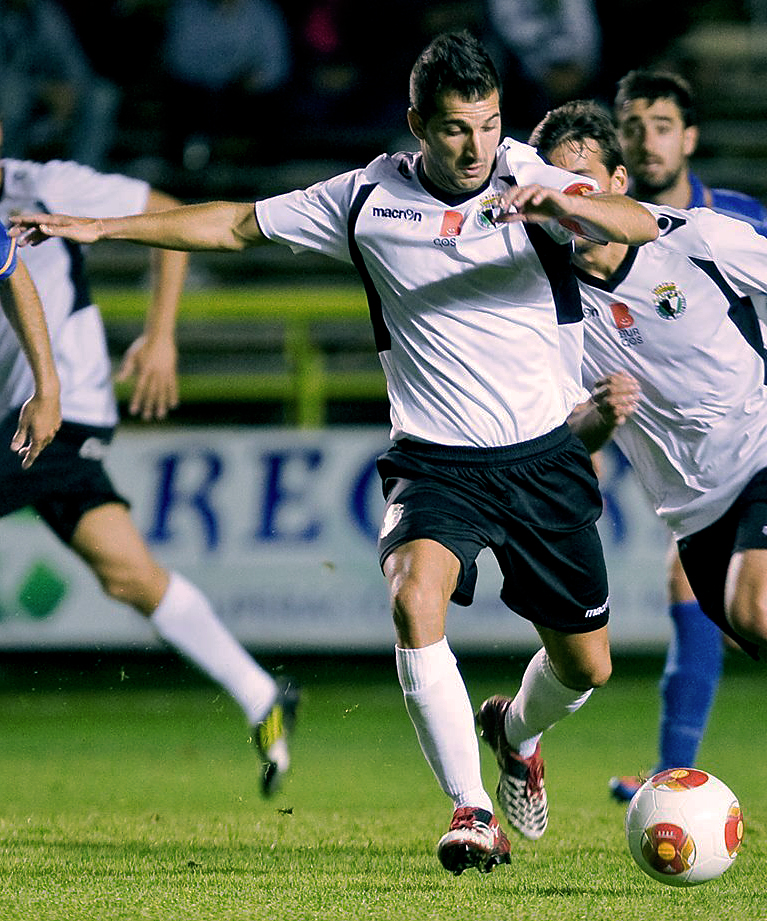

Personal information
- Full name: Fernando Miguel Carralero García
- Date of birth: 16 May 1986 (age 40)
- Place of birth: San Fernando, Cádiz, Spain
- Height: 1.74 m (5 ft 9 in)
- Position: Left midfielder

Senior career*
Years	Team	Apps	(Gls)
2005–2006	Real Betis C		
2006–2007	Real Betis B		
2007–2008	Lucena	18	(1)
2008–2009	Sabadell	29	(4)
2009–2010	Almería B		
2010–2011	Arroyo		
2011	Chiclana		
2011–2012	Conil		
2012–2015	Burgos	70	(10)
2015	Ebro	14	(1)
2016	Botoșani	10	(0)
2016–2017	San Fernando	34	(11)
2017–2019	El Ejido	49	(10)
2019–2020	Calahorra	32	(2)
2021–2022	Lincoln Red Imps	27	(10)
2022–2023	Atlético Sanluqueño	5	(0)
2023–2024	Polideportivo Almería	23	(3)
- * Club domestic league appearances and goals

Fernando Miguel Carralero García (born 16 May 1986) is a Spanish former footballer who played as a midfielder.
