= Javi López (footballer, born 1990) =

Spanish footballer

Personal information
- Full name: Javier López Muñoz
- Date of birth: 16 October 1990 (age 36)
- Place of birth: El Carpio, Spain
- Height: 1.87 m (6 ft 1 1/2 in)
- Position: Forward

Youth career
- 2006–2008: Séneca
- 2008–2009: Almería

Senior career*
Years	Team	Apps	(Gls)
2009–2010	Almería B	1	(0)
2009–2010	→ Pozoblanco (loan)	17	(2)
2010	→ Ávila (loan)	17	(4)
2010–2011	Marinaleda	34	(6)
2011–2013	Córdoba B	67	(27)
2011	Córdoba	1	(0)
2013	Écija	15	(2)
2014	Badajoz	20	(16)
2014–2016	Arenas Getxo	66	(21)
2016–2017	Arandina	19	(2)
2017	Badajoz	17	(2)
2017	Linares	10	(2)
2018	Jammerbugt FC	0	(0)
- * Club domestic league appearances and goals as of 19 November 2017

Javier 'Javi' López Muñoz (born 16 October 1990) is a Spanish professional footballer who most recently played for Jammerbugt FC as a forward.

== Football career ==
Born in El Carpio, Province of Córdoba, Andalusia, López finished his graduation with local UD Almería, and made his senior debuts in the 2008–09 season with the reserves, in the Tercera División. In the following four seasons he played in the fourth level, representing CD Pozoblanco, Real Ávila CF, UD Marinaleda and Córdoba CF B.

On 3 September 2011 López first appeared with the latter's Cordoba's first team, playing the last 24 minutes of a 0–2 away loss against Real Valladolid in the Segunda División.

In July 2013, the free agent López signed with Écija Balompié of the Segunda División B. The following January he moved to fellow third-tier team Badajoz CF.

López signed with Danish club Jammerbugt FC in August 2018, but left the club again at the end of the year.
