= Racing Cartagena Mar Menor FC =

Association football club in Spain

Racing Cartagena MM
- Full name: Racing Cartagena Mar Menor Fútbol Club
- Founded: 2007
- Dissolved: 2024
- Ground: Pitín, San Javier, Murcia, Spain
- Capacity: 3,000
- Chairman: Francisco Sánchez
- Manager: Alberto Niño
- 2023–24: Segunda Federación – Group 4, 14th of 18 (relegated)
Home colours	Away colours

Racing Cartagena Mar Menor Fútbol Club, known as Racing Cartagena MM, was a Spanish football team based in San Javier, in the autonomous community of Murcia. Founded in 2007, it held home games at Estadio Pitín, with a capacity of 3,000 seats.

== History ==
Club crest used from 2007 until 2017

Club crest used from 2017 until 2023

Mar Menor Club de Fútbol was founded in 2007, after the disappearance of AD Mar Menor-San Javier. The club first reached Tercera División in 2010, after three seasons of existence.

In February 2017 the club changed its crest and its denomination to Mar Menor Football Club. In 2021, the club achieved promotion to the newly-formed Segunda División RFEF.

On 7 July 2023, Mar Menor moved to the city of Cartagena after the club reached an agreement with Cartagena FC to use their facilities; the club was also renamed to Racing Cartagena Mar Menor Fútbol Club, with Racing Murcia FC becoming their reserve team. In June of the following year, however, after being relegated from Segunda Federación, the club suffered another administrative relegation due to debts, and subsequently went inactive after not registering for the Preferente Autonómica.

== Season to season ==
Season	Tier	Division	Place	Copa del Rey
2007–08	6	1ª Terr.	4th	
2008–09	5	Terr. Pref.	13th	
2009–10	5	Terr. Pref.	3rd	
2010–11	4	3ª	3rd	
2011–12	4	3ª	3rd	
2012–13	4	3ª	3rd	
2013–14	4	3ª	4th	
2014–15	4	3ª	5th	
2015–16	4	3ª	4th	

Season	Tier	Division	Place	Copa del Rey
2016–17	4	3ª	4th	
2017–18	4	3ª	2nd	
2018–19	4	3ª	7th	
2019–20	4	3ª	3rd	
2020–21	4	3ª	1st / 3rd	
2021–22	4	2ª RFEF	6th	
2022–23	4	2ª Fed.	8th	
2023–24	4	2ª Fed.	14th	

- 3 seasons in Segunda Federación
- 10 seasons in Tercera División
