= Emilio Guerra =

Spanish footballer

Personal information
- Full name: José Emilio Guerra Rodríguez
- Date of birth: 15 March 1982 (age 44)
- Place of birth: Vélez-Málaga, Spain
- Height: 1.81 m (5 ft 11 1/2 in)
- Position: Forward

Senior career*
Years	Team	Apps	(Gls)
1999–2000	Espanyol B	10	(0)
2000–2001	Vilassar Mar	22	(4)
2001	Figueres	2	(1)
2001–2003	Reus	53	(15)
2003–2004	Palamós	17	(2)
2004	Linares	8	(0)
2004–2005	Sabadell	19	(3)
2005–2006	Granada Atlético	37	(22)
2006–2007	Zaragoza B	34	(42)
2007–2008	Barcelona B	26	(13)
2008–2009	Atlético Madrid B	27	(6)
2009–2010	Atlético Ciudad	22	(4)
2010	Castellón	10	(0)
2010–2011	Benidorm	24	(6)
2011–2012	Puertollano	25	(7)
2012–2013	Málaga B	37	(26)
2013	Kavala	0	(0)
2014	Săgeata	20	(5)
2015	Academica Clinceni	3	(0)
2015–2019	Vélez	106	(49)
2019–2021	Torre del Mar	20	(8)
2021	Rincón	5	(3)
Total		527	(216)
- * Club domestic league appearances and goals

José Emilio Guerra Rodríguez (born 15 March 1982) is a Spanish former professional footballer who played as a forward.

== Club career ==
Guerra was born in Vélez-Málaga, Andalusia. He played ten Segunda División matches with CD Castellón, for which he signed in February 2010 one month shy of his 28th birthday, but spent the vast majority of his career in the lower leagues of his country.

Guerra's twin brother, Javier, was also a footballer and a forward, and represented mainly Real Valladolid and Rayo Vallecano.
