= Rafa Gómez (footballer, born 1983) =

Spanish footballer

Personal information
- Full name: Rafael Gómez Llorens
- Date of birth: 23 May 1983 (age 43)
- Place of birth: Alicante, Spain
- Height: 1.79 m (5 ft 10 in)
- Position: Forward

Youth career
- Kelme

Senior career*
| Years | Team | Apps | (Gls) |
| 2002–2007 | Elche B | | |
| 2003–2004 | → Yeclano (loan) | 6 | (0) |
| 2004 | → Caudal (loan) | 11 | (0) |
| 2007–2008 | Torrellano | 15 | (9) |
| 2008–2009 | Alcoyano | 45 | (11) |
| 2009–2011 | Elche | 8 | (0) |
| 2010 | → Sangonera (loan) | 4 | (0) |
| 2011–2012 | Alcoyano | 14 | (2) |
| 2012–2013 | Cacereño | 13 | (0) |
| 2013 | Badajoz | 11 | (2) |
| 2013–2016 | Torrevieja | 53 | (12) |
| 2016–2017 | La Nucía | 25 | (6) |
| 2018–2019 | Alicante | 25 | (7) |
| 2019–2020 | Tháder | | |
| 2020 | El Altet | | |
| 2021 | Atlético Benidorm | | |
| 2021–2022 | Calpe | | |
- * Club domestic league appearances and goals

Rafael 'Rafa' Gómez Llorens (born 23 May 1983) is a Spanish former footballer who played as a forward.

== Club career ==
Gómez was born in Alicante, Valencian Community. After five years at local Elche CF where he did not receive one single first-team opportunity, he played in the following years mostly in the fourth division, but also spent some months in the fifth with Torrellano Illice CF, also in his native region.

In the summer of 2009, after helping CD Alcoyano to the (unsuccessful) promotion playoffs to the second level, Gómez signed a two-year deal with first club Elche, with the side in that same tier. Two years later, he returned to his previous team.
