= David Verdú =

Spanish footballer

Personal information
- Full name: David Verdú López
- Date of birth: 25 September 1988 (age 38)
- Place of birth: Silla, Valencia, Spain
- Height: 1.80 m (5 ft 11 in)
- Position: Centre forward

Senior career*
Years	Team	Apps	(Gls)
2011–2012	CD Dénia	20	(3)
2012–2013	UD Alzira	5	(0)
2013–2014	Ontinyent CF	35	(9)
2014	AEL	6	(0)
- * Club domestic league appearances and goals as of 21 December 2014

David Verdú López (born 25 September 1988) is a Spanish footballer who last played for AEL in the Greek Football League as a centre forward.
