= Juan Carlos Ortiz =

Spanish footballer (born 1985)

Personal information
- Full name: Juan Carlos Ortiz Padilla
- Date of birth: 28 June 1985 (age 41)
- Place of birth: Córdoba, Spain
- Height: 1.80 m (5 ft 11 in)
- Position: Forward

Youth career
- Valladolid

Senior career*
| Years | Team | Apps | (Gls) |
| 2003–2007 | Valladolid B | 50 | (9) |
| 2005 | Valladolid | 5 | (0) |
| 2006 | → Jaén (loan) | 12 | (2) |
| 2007–2008 | Algeciras | 22 | (6) |
| 2008 | Villajoyosa | 15 | (5) |
| 2008–2010 | Puertollano | 59 | (11) |
| 2010–2011 | Badajoz | 28 | (3) |
| 2011–2012 | Écija | 19 | (2) |
| 2012 | Linense | 13 | (1) |
| 2012–2014 | Cultural Leonesa | 74 | (32) |
| 2014–2015 | Langreo | 37 | (8) |
| 2015–2016 | Coruxo | 30 | (4) |
| 2016 | Global | 1 | (0) |
| 2016–2017 | Peña Deportiva | 37 | (14) |
| 2017 | Sant Rafel | 7 | (2) |
| 2017–2018 | Recambios Colón | 15 | (4) |
| 2018 | Salmantino | 15 | (2) |
| 2018–2019 | CD Ibiza | 37 | (16) |
| 2019–2020 | Sant Rafel | 27 | (10) |
| 2020–2021 | CD Ibiza | 23 | (8) |
| 2021–2022 | Portmany | 32 | (6) |
- * Club domestic league appearances and goals

Juan Carlos Ortiz Padilla (born 28 June 1985) is a Spanish former professional footballer who played as a forward. He was born in Córdoba, Andalusia.
