= Adán Pérez =

Spanish footballer

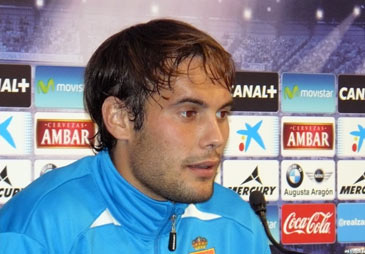

Personal information
- Full name: Adán Pérez Cavero
- Date of birth: 24 October 1989 (age 37)
- Place of birth: Quinto, Spain
- Height: 1.80 m (5 ft 11 in)
- Position: Midfielder

Team information
- Current team: Andorra CF

Youth career
- Fuentes
- Santo Domingo Juventud
- Amistad
- Varea
- 2007–2008: Amistad

Senior career*
| Years | Team | Apps | (Gls) |
| 2008–2009 | Andorra | 0 | (0) |
| 2008–2009 | → Universidad Zaragoza (loan) | 27 | (8) |
| 2009–2010 | Almazán | 16 | (3) |
| 2010–2012 | Numancia B | 59 | (16) |
| 2012–2013 | Andorra | 36 | (17) |
| 2013–2014 | Zaragoza B | 41 | (23) |
| 2014–2016 | Zaragoza | 2 | (0) |
| 2014–2015 | → Racing Santander (loan) | 6 | (0) |
| 2015–2016 | → Ebro (loan) | 18 | (2) |
| 2016–2017 | Navalcarnero | 29 | (4) |
| 2017–2019 | Tudelano | 71 | (8) |
| 2019–2020 | Teruel | 19 | (4) |
| 2020–2021 | Borja | 26 | (3) |
| 2021–2023 | Utebo | 58 | (18) |
| 2023–2025 | Calamocha | 45 | (5) |
| 2025– | Andorra CF | 8 | (1) |
- * Club domestic league appearances and goals as of 9 November 2025

Adán Pérez Cavero (born 24 October 1989) is a Spanish footballer who plays as a midfielder for Tercera Federación club Andorra CF.

== Club career ==
Born in Quinto, Zaragoza, Pérez made his senior debuts with CD Universidad de Zaragoza in the regional leagues, on loan from Andorra CF. He moved to Tercera División side SD Almazán in 2009, and continued to appear in the fourth level in the following years, representing CD Numancia B and Andorra.

On 28 June 2013 Pérez joined Real Zaragoza, being assigned to the reserves in the same division. He scored 23 goals during the campaign, also netting a brace in the play-offs' 3–1 win against CF Trival Valderas, and thus taking the Aragonese back to Segunda División B.

On 14 July 2014 Pérez signed a new two-year deal with the Blanquillos, being definitely promoted to the main squad in Segunda División. He played his first match as a professional on 23 August, starting in a 0–0 away draw against Recreativo de Huelva.

On 1 September 2014 Pérez moved to fellow league team Racing de Santander, in a season-long loan deal. On 7 August of the following year, after appearing rarely, he moved to CD Ebro in Segunda División B also in a temporary deal; upon returning, he rescinded his contract.
