= CD Don Benito =

Spanish football team

Coordinates: 38.962733°N 5.865696°W

Don Benito
- Full name: Club Deportivo Don Benito
- Nicknames: Calabazones; Rojiblancos
- Founded: 19 August 1928; 98 years ago as Club Deportivo Balompié Don Benito
- Stadium: Estadio Vicente Sanz
- Capacity: 5,000
- President: Enrique Olea Godoy
- Head coach: Canica
- League: Segunda Federación – Group 4
- 2025–26: Tercera Federación – Group 14, 1st of 18 (champions)
- Website: deportivodonbenito.com
Home colours	Away colours

Club Deportivo Don Benito is a Spanish football team based in Don Benito, in the autonomous community of Extremadura. Founded in 1928 it plays in Segunda Federación – Group 4, holding home matches at Estadio Vicente Sanz, with a capacity of 5,000 seats.

== History ==
The club was founded on August 19, 1928. In the Modern Hall (now Imperial Theater), 150 young people gathered to agree upon the board of directors of the football society. Vicente Sanz Diéguez was appointed a president.

== Season to season ==
Season	Tier	Division	Place	Copa del Rey
1929–30	4	1ª Reg.	1st	Round of 32
1930–31	4	1ª Reg.	1st	Round of 32
1931–32	4	1ª Reg.	1st	Round of 32
1932–33	4	1ª Reg.	4th	
1933–34	4	1ª Reg.	5th	
1934–35	DNP			
1935–36	DNP			
1939–40	DNP			
1940–41	4	1ª Reg.	4th	
1941–1945	DNP			
1945–46	4	1ª Reg.	3rd	
1946–47	4	1ª Reg.	1st	
1947–48	4	1ª Reg.	4th	
1948–49	4	1ª Reg.	4th	
1949–50	4	1ª Reg.	7th	
1950–51	4	1ª Reg.	4th	
1951–52	4	1ª Reg.	4th	
1952–53	4	1ª Reg.	1st	
1953–54	3	3ª	6th	
1954–55	3	3ª	1st	

Season	Tier	Division	Place	Copa del Rey
1955–56	3	3ª	1st	
1956–57	3	3ª	5th	
1957–58	3	3ª	14th	
1958–59	3	3ª	3rd	
1959–60	3	3ª	11th	
1960–61	3	3ª	11th	
1961–62	3	3ª	13th	
1962–63	4	1ª Reg.	1st	
1963–64	3	3ª	9th	
1964–65	3	3ª	11th	
1965–66	3	3ª	7th	
1966–67	3	3ª	13th	
1967–68	3	3ª	15th	
1968–69	4	1ª Reg.	2nd	
1969–70	4	1ª Reg.	2nd	
1970–71	4	1ª Reg.	6th	
1971–72	4	1ª Reg.	4th	
1972–73	4	1ª Reg.	9th	
1973–74	4	1ª Reg.	3rd	
1974–75	4	Reg. Pref.	7th	

Season	Tier	Division	Place	Copa del Rey
1975–76	4	Reg. Pref.	5th	
1976–77	4	Reg. Pref.	3rd	
1977–78	4	3ª	17th	First round
1978–79	4	3ª	15th	First round
1979–80	4	3ª	12th	Second round
1980–81	4	3ª	2nd	
1981–82	4	3ª	11th	First round
1982–83	4	3ª	15th	
1983–84	4	3ª	5th	
1984–85	4	3ª	9th	Second round
1985–86	4	3ª	2nd	
1986–87	4	3ª	9th	Second round
1987–88	4	3ª	1st	
1988–89	3	2ª B	19th	
1989–90	4	3ª	3rd	
1990–91	4	3ª	1st	First round
1991–92	4	3ª	4th	First round
1992–93	4	3ª	2nd	Second round
1993–94	4	3ª	4th	
1994–95	4	3ª	1st	

Season	Tier	Division	Place	Copa del Rey
1995–96	4	3ª	7th	
1996–97	4	3ª	6th	
1997–98	4	3ª	10th	
1998–99	4	3ª	3rd	
1999–2000	4	3ª	2nd	
2000–01	3	2ª B	19th	First round
2001–02	4	3ª	2nd	
2002–03	4	3ª	2nd	
2003–04	4	3ª	1st	
2004–05	3	2ª B	18th	Round of 64
2005–06	4	3ª	3rd	
2006–07	4	3ª	2nd	
2007–08	4	3ª	1st	
2008–09	4	3ª	4th	Third round
2009–10	4	3ª	8th	
2010–11	4	3ª	7th	
2011–12	4	3ª	4th	
2012–13	4	3ª	3rd	
2013–14	4	3ª	7th	
2014–15	4	3ª	7th	

Season	Tier	Division	Place	Copa del Rey
2015–16	4	3ª	5th	
2016–17	4	3ª	4th	
2017–18	4	3ª	1st	
2018–19	3	2ª B	15th	First round
2019–20	3	2ª B	14th	
2020–21	3	2ª B	5th / 6th	
2021–22	4	2ª RFEF	13th	
2022–23	4	2ª Fed.	18th	
2023–24	5	3ª Fed.	1st	
2024–25	4	2ª Fed.	18th	First round
2025–26	5	3ª Fed.	1st	
2026–27	4	2ª Fed.		TBD

- 6 seasons in Segunda División B
- 4 seasons in Segunda Federación/Segunda División RFEF
- 52 seasons in Tercera División
- 2 seasons in Tercera Federación

== Honours ==
- Extremadura Championship
  - Winners (3): 1929–30, 1930–31, 1931–32
- Tercera División
  - Winners (8): 1954–55, 1955–56, 1987–88, 1990–91, 1994–95, 2003–04, 2007–08, 2017–18

== Current squad ==
As of 10 April 2021

Note: Flags indicate national team as defined under FIFA eligibility rules; some limited exceptions apply. Players may hold more than one non-FIFA nationality.

No.	Pos.	Nation	Player
1	GK	ESP	Sebas Gil
2	DF	ESP	Trini
3	DF	ESP	Joserra de Diego
4	DF	ESP	Ismael Heredia
5	DF	TUN	Selim Ben Djemia
6	MF	ESP	Roberto Moreno
7	FW	ESP	Rafa Mella
8	MF	ESP	Gonzalo Barroso (captain)
9	FW	ESP	David Agudo
10	MF	ESP	Manu Ramírez

No.	Pos.	Nation	Player
12	FW	GHA	Ginaid Aruna
13	GK	ESP	Fran Delma
14	DF	ESP	Samuel Goñi
15	DF	CIV	Varane Ibrahim Konate (on loan from Badajoz)
16	MF	JPN	Yuya Yoshimura
17	DF	ESP	Álex Herrera
18	FW	ESP	Dani López
19	FW	ESP	Xiscu Martínez
20	FW	ESP	Tete
22	FW	ESP	Abraham Gómez

== Famous players ==
- (Albania) Albert Stroni
- (Spain) Juanma
