= 2013–14 Copa del Rey =

Copa del Rey
112th Copa del Rey

Tournament details
- Country: Spain
- Teams: 83

Final positions
- Champions: Real Madrid (19th title)
- Runners-up: Barcelona

Tournament statistics
- Matches played: 97
- Goals scored: 236 (2.43 per match)
- Top goal scorer(s): Lionel Messi (5 goals)

The 2013–14 Copa del Rey was the 112th staging of the Copa del Rey (including two seasons where two rival editions were played). The competition began on 4 September 2013 and ended on 16 April 2014 with the final. The final took place at Mestalla in Valencia, and saw Real Madrid defeat Barcelona 2–1 to win their 19th title in the competition. The winners assured a place for the group stage of the 2014–15 UEFA Europa League, although Madrid qualified for the 2014–15 UEFA Champions League due to their league performance.

Atlético Madrid were the defending champions, but were eliminated by Real Madrid in the semi-finals, who avenged their 2013 final defeat.

== Calendar and format ==
The next calendar was released by the RFEF on 8 August 2013 and the format was identical to the previous season.

| Round | Draw date | Date | Fixtures | Clubs | Format details |
|---|---|---|---|---|---|
| First round | 20 August 2013 | 4 September 2013 | 18 | 83 → 65 | New entries: Clubs participating in Tercera and Segunda División B will gain entry. Byes: Seven teams from Segunda División B will receive a bye. Opponents seeding: Teams will face each other according to proximity criteria. Local team seeding: Luck of the draw. Knock-out tournament type: Single match Copa Federación qualification: losers will qualify for 2013–14 Copa Federación, National phase. |
| Second round | 20 August 2013 | 11 September 2013 | 22 | 65 → 43 | New entries: Clubs participating in Segunda División will gain entry. Byes: One team from the first round will receive a bye. Opponents seeding: Segunda División teams will face each other. Local team seeding: Luck of the draw. Knock-out tournament type: Single match |
| Third round | 13 September 2013 | 16 October 2013 | 11 | 43 → 32 | Byes: One team from Segunda División B or Tercera División, which previously didn't receive a bye, will receive one. Opponents seeding: Segunda División teams will face each other. Local team seeding: Luck of the draw. Knock-out tournament type: Single match |
| Round of 32 | 8 November 2013 | 6–8 December 2013 | 16 | 32 → 16 | New entries: Clubs participating in La Liga will gain entry. Opponents seeding: The seven teams from La Liga which were qualified for 2013–14 UEFA competitions, will face against remaining seven teams from Segunda División B and Tercera División. The five remaining Segunda División teams will face against La Liga teams. The eight remaining La Liga teams will face each other. Local team seeding: First leg at home of team in lower division. Knock-out tournament type: Double match |
| Round of 32 | 8 November 2013 | 17–19 December 2013 | 16 | 32 → 16 | New entries: Clubs participating in La Liga will gain entry. Opponents seeding: The seven teams from La Liga which were qualified for 2013–14 UEFA competitions, will face against remaining seven teams from Segunda División B and Tercera División. The five remaining Segunda División teams will face against La Liga teams. The eight remaining La Liga teams will face each other. Local team seeding: First leg at home of team in lower division. Knock-out tournament type: Double match |
| Round of 16 | | 7–9 January 2014 | 8 | 16 → 8 | Opponents seeding: Luck of the draw. Local team seeding: First leg at home of team in lower division. Knock-out tournament type: Double match |
| Round of 16 | | 14–16 January 2014 | 8 | 16 → 8 | Opponents seeding: Luck of the draw. Local team seeding: First leg at home of team in lower division. Knock-out tournament type: Double match |
| Quarter-finals | | 21–23 January 2014 | 4 | 8 → 4 | Opponents seeding: Luck of the draw. Local team seeding: Luck of the draw. Knock-out tournament type: Double match |
| Quarter-finals | | 28–30 January 2014 | 4 | 8 → 4 | Opponents seeding: Luck of the draw. Local team seeding: Luck of the draw. Knock-out tournament type: Double match |
| Semifinals | | 5 February 2014 | 2 | 4 → 2 | Opponents seeding: Luck of the draw. Local team seeding: Luck of the draw. Knock-out tournament type: Double match |
| Semifinals | | 11–12 February 2014 | 2 | 4 → 2 | Opponents seeding: Luck of the draw. Local team seeding: Luck of the draw. Knock-out tournament type: Double match |
| Final | | 16 April 2014 | 1 | 2 → 1 | Single match in a stadium decided by RFEF. UEFA Europa League qualification: winner will qualify for 2014–15 UEFA Europa League, group stage. |

Notes

- Double-match rounds enforced away goals rule, single-match rounds did not.
- Games ending in a tie were decided in extra time; and if it persisted, by a penalty shootout.
- UEFA Europa League qualification: if the Cup winner qualified for the 2014–15 UEFA Champions League, the Cup runner-up would qualify for the third qualifying round, then the 5th and 6th ranked teams in 2013–14 La Liga (always excluding no "UEFA licence" and banned clubs) would qualify for group stage and play-off round respectively. However, if the Cup runners-up ended in Europa League places (5th or 6th), the 5th, 6th and 7th ranked teams in 2013–14 La Liga would qualify for group stage, play-off round and third qualifying round respectively.
  Similarly, if both finalists qualified for the 2014–15 UEFA Champions League, the 5th, 6th and 7th ranked teams in 2013–14 La Liga would also qualify for the group stage, play-off round and third qualifying round respectively.

== Qualified teams ==
The following teams compete in the Copa del Rey 2013–14.

20 teams of 2013–14 La Liga:

- Almería
- Athletic Bilbao
- Atlético Madrid
- Barcelona
- Betis
- Celta Vigo
- Elche
- Espanyol
- Getafe
- Granada
- Levante
- Málaga
- Osasuna
- Rayo Vallecano
- Real Madrid
- Real Sociedad
- Sevilla
- Valencia
- Valladolid
- Villarreal

20 teams of 2013–14 Segunda División (Barcelona B and RM Castilla are excluded for being reserve teams):

- Alavés
- Alcorcón
- Córdoba
- Deportivo La Coruña
- Eibar
- Girona
- Hércules
- Jaén
- Las Palmas
- Lugo
- Mallorca
- Mirandés
- Murcia
- Numancia
- Ponferradina
- Recreativo
- Sabadell
- Sporting Gijón
- Tenerife
- Zaragoza

35 teams of 2013–14 Segunda División B. Teams that qualified are the top five teams of each of the 4 groups (excluding reserve teams), the five with the highest number of points out of the remaining non-reserve teams (*), and the eleven teams winners of a group of 2012–13 Tercera División that were also promoted to Segunda División B:

- Albacete
- Alcoyano
- Algeciras
- Amorebieta
- Balompédica Linense
- Barakaldo
- Burgos
- Cartagena
- Caudal
- Écija
- El Palo
- Fuenlabrada
- Gimnàstic
- Guadalajara
- Huesca
- Huracán Valencia
- La Hoya Lorca
- Laudio
- Leganés
- L'Hospitalet
- Lleida Esportiu
- Lucena
- Olímpic
- Olot
- Oviedo
- Puerta Bonita
- Racing Ferrol
- Racing Santander
- Real Unión
- San Fernando
- Sant Andreu
- Sariñena
- Toledo
- Tropezón
- Tudelano

8 teams of 2013–14 Tercera División. Teams that qualified are 7 of 18 champions that were not promoted to Segunda División B (or at least the ones with the highest number of points within their group since reserve teams are excluded), and Xerez that was relegated from Segunda División:

- Atlético Granadilla
- Extremadura UD
- Haro Deportivo
- Novelda
- San Juan
- Santa Eulàlia
- Tuilla
- Xerez

== First round ==
The draw for First and Second round was held on 20 August 2013 at 13:00 CEST in La Ciudad del Fútbol, RFEF headquarters, in Las Rozas, Madrid. In this round gained entry 36 Segunda División B and Tercera División teams. In the draw, firstly seven teams from the 2013–14 Segunda División B received a bye (Fuenlabrada, L'Hospitalet, Lleida, Lucena, Olímpic de Xàtiva, Racing Santander and Tudelano) then remaining teams from 2013–14 Segunda División B and teams from 2013–14 Tercera División faced according to proximity criteria by next groups:

| Pot 1 Group 1 | Pot 2 Group 2 | Pot 3 Group 3 | Pot 4 Group 4 |
|---|---|---|---|
| Segunda División B: Burgos; Caudal; Oviedo; Racing Ferrol; Racing Santander * Tropezón Tercera División: Haro Deportivo; Tuilla | Segunda División B: Amorebieta; Barakaldo; Fuenlabrada * Huesca; Laudio; Leganés; Puerta Bonita; Real Unión; Sariñena; Toledo; Tudelano * Tercera División: Atlético Granadilla; San Juan | Segunda División B: Alcoyano; Gimnàstic; Huracán Valencia; L'Hospitalet * Lleida * Olímpic * Olot; Sant Andreu Tercera División: Novelda; Peña Deportiva | Segunda División B: Albacete; Algeciras; Balompédica Linense; Cartagena; Écija; El Palo; Guadalajara; La Hoya Lorca; Lucena * San Fernando Tercera División: Extremadura; Xerez |

Notes

- (*) Received a bye
- Remaining teams in odd groups faced each other and with proximity criteria if it would be possible.

=== Matches ===
| 4 September 2013 | Sariñena | 1–0 (a.e.t.) | Puerta Bonita | Sariñena |
| 18:00 | Úbeda 105' | Report | | Stadium: El Carmen; Referee: Ávalos Martos |

| 4 September 2013 | Sant Andreu | 2–1 | Peña Deportiva | Barcelona |
| 18:00 | Guzmán 34'; Francis 84' (pen.) | Report | Etamané 3' | Stadium: Narcís Sala; Referee: Pérez Peraza |

| 4 September 2013 | Laudio | 3–1 (a.e.t.) | Real Unión | Laudio-Llodio |
| 19:30 | Aimar 90+1' (o.g.); Luariz 116'; Germán 120' | Report | Saizar 66' | Stadium: Ellakuri; Referee: Lixandru |

| 4 September 2013 | Tropezón | 0–1 (a.e.t.) | Tuilla | Torrelavega |
| | | Report | Miguel 103' | Stadium: Santa Ana; Referee: José Luis Corral García |

| 4 September 2013 | Leganés | 3–0 | Atlético Granadilla | Leganés |
| 20:00 CEST | Mantovani 29'; Valleros 45'; Álvarez 79' | | | Stadium: Butarque; Referee: Víctor Rives Leal |

| 4 September 2013 | Barakaldo | 1–0 | Amorebieta | Barakaldo |
| 20:00 CEST | Goti 11' | | | Stadium: Lasesarre; Referee: César Soto Grado |

| 4 September 2013 | Olot | 3–2 | Huracán Valencia | Olot |
| 20:00 CEST | Ferrón 34', 51'; Arnal 90' | | Luismi 16'; Perona 56' | Stadium: Municipal d'Olot; Referee: Iván González González |

| 4 September 2013 | Haro | 0–0 (4–2 p) | Oviedo | Haro |
| 20:15 CEST | | | | Stadium: El Mazo; Referee: Óscar Herrero Arenas |
| | Penalties |
| | Alberto (penalty scored); Liébana (penalty scored); López (penalty scored); Suárez (penalty scored) | | Cervero (penalty missed); Pardo (penalty scored); Simón (penalty scored); Susaeta (penalty missed) |

| 4 September 2013 | Caudal | 1–0 | Racing Ferrol | Mieres |
| 20:15 CEST | Landeira 74' | | | Stadium: Hermanos Antuña; Referee: Adrián Cordero Vega |

| 4 September 2013 | Gimnàstic | 1–1 (4–2 p) | Alcoyano | Tarragona |
| 20:30 CEST | Querol 91' | | Rubio 104' | Stadium: Nou Estadi; Referee: Alfons Melgares de Aguilar Fernández |
| | Penalties |
| | Marcos (penalty scored); Viale (penalty scored); Sánchez (penalty scored); Coch (penalty scored); Rocha (penalty scored) | | Bello (penalty scored); Rayco (penalty missed); Remón (penalty scored); Gissi (penalty missed) |

| 4 September 2013 | Cartagena | 2–1 | Guadalajara | Cartagena |
| 20:30 CEST | Menudo 36'; Megías 38' | | Toledo 2' | Stadium: Cartagonova; Referee: Rebollo López |

| 4 September 2013 | Burgos | 3–1 (a.e.t.) | San Juan | Burgos |
| 20:30 CEST | Gabri 26'; Abdón 92', 116' | | Lusarreta 90+4' | Stadium: El Plantío; Referee: Suberbiola Zúñiga |

| 4 September 2013 | Toledo | 0–1 | Huesca | Toledo |
| 20:45 CEST | | | Tariq 11' | Stadium: Salto del Caballo; Referee: López Puerta |

| 4 September 2013 | Extremadura | 1–2 | Albacete | Almendralejo |
| 21:00 CEST | Ruiz 46' | | Molina 38'; Calle 79' | Stadium: Francisco de la Hera; Referee: Vicente Moral |

| 4 September 2013 | Écija | 2–2 (3–2 p) | La Hoya Lorca | Écija |
| 21:00 CEST | López 3'; Vela 73' (pen.) | | Martínez 8', 69' (pen.) | Stadium: San Pablo; Referee: Collado López |
| | Penalties |
| | Humberto (penalty scored); Cervera (penalty scored); Núñez (penalty scored); Úbeda (penalty missed) | | Armando (penalty missed); Juanito (penalty scored); Ortuño (penalty missed); Rodríguez (penalty scored); Sánchez (penalty missed) |

| 4 September 2013 | El Palo | 1–1 (2–4 p) | Xerez | Málaga |
| 21:00 CEST | Juanillo 100' | | Óliver 105' (o.g.) | Stadium: San Ignacio; Referee: Milla Alvéndiz |
| | Penalties |
| | Julio (penalty scored); Falu (penalty missed); Flores (penalty missed); Gaspar (penalty scored) | | Nico (penalty missed); Seoane (penalty scored); Curro (penalty scored); Melo (penalty scored); Aguilar (penalty scored) |

| 4 September 2013 | Algeciras | 2–1 | Novelda | Algeciras |
| 21:00 CEST | Pedro 53'; Romero 70' | | Rial 21' | Stadium: Nuevo Mirador; Referee: García Maqueda |

| 4 September 2013 | San Fernando | 1–0 | Linense | San Fernando |
| 21:30 CEST | Ocaña 24' | | | Stadium: Iberoamericano; Referee: Benjumea Álvarez |

== Second round ==
The draw was held together with the First round draw on 20 August 2013 in La Ciudad del Fútbol. In the draw, the team from 2013–14 Segunda División B or 2013–14 Tercera División, winner from First round match Algeciras v Novelda, received a bye. Teams from 2013–14 Segunda División gained entry in this round and faced each other. Winners of First round, together with the seven teams which received a bye, faced each other too.

| Pot 1 Segunda División | Pot 2 Segunda División B and Tercera División |
|---|---|
| Segunda División: Alavés; Alcorcón; Córdoba; Deportivo La Coruña; Eibar; Girona; Hércules; Jaén; Las Palmas; Lugo; Mallorca; Mirandés; Murcia; Numancia; Ponferradina; Recreativo; Sabadell; Sporting Gijón; Tenerife; Zaragoza | Segunda División B: Fuenlabrada; L'Hospitalet; Lleida; Lucena; Olímpic de Xàtiva; Racing Santander; Tudelano; Caudal de Mieres; Sariñena; Barakaldo; Laudio; Huesca; Olot; Gimnàstic Tarragona; Écija; San Fernando; Cartagena; Leganés; Sant Andreu; Extremadura; Burgos; Algeciras* Tercera División: Haro Deportivo; Tuilla; Xerez |

=== Matches ===
| 11 September 2013 | Tuilla | 0–3 | Burgos | Langreo |
| 20:00 CEST | | | Gabri 4'; Héctor 70'; Prats 75' | Stadium: Estadio El Candín; Attendance: 700 |

| 11 September 2013 | Haro | 1–0 | Sariñena | Haro |
| 20:15 CEST | Fernández 46' | | | Stadium: Estadio El Mazo |

| 11 September 2013 Match 21 | Gimnàstic | 1–1 (a.e.t.) (4–1 p) | Albacete | Tarragona |
| 12:00 CEST | Querol 65' | | Samu 76' | Stadium: Nou Estadi de Tarragona; Attendance: 2,180 |
| | Penalties |
| | Verdú (penalty scored); Viale (penalty scored); Sánchez (penalty scored); Giner (penalty scored) | | Calle (penalty scored); Israel (penalty missed); José Carlos (penalty missed) |

| 11 September 2013 | L'Hospitalet | 3–4 (a.e.t.) | Racing Santander | L'Hospitalet de Llobregat |
| 19:00 CEST | Moussa 9'; Soria 66' (o.g.); Haro 100' | | Soria 17' (pen.); Koné 76'; Andreu 107'; Miguélez 119' | Stadium: Feixa Llarga |

| 11 September 2013 | San Fernando | 0–1 (a.e.t.) | Tudelano | San Fernando |
| 21:30 CEST | | Report | David 114' | Stadium: Iberoamericano |

| 11 September 2013 | Huesca | 0–1 | Cartagena | Huesca |
| 20:45 CEST | | | Fede 63' | Stadium: Estadio El Alcoraz; Attendance: 1,000 |

| 11 September 2013 | Écija | 0–2 | Laudio | Écija |
| 21:00 CEST | | | Larrucea 16'; Del Álamo 78' | Stadium: Estadio San Pablo; Attendance: 400 |

| 11 September 2013 | Sant Andreu | 2–0 | Olot | Barcelona |
| | Jiménez 28'; Francis 63' | | | Stadium: Camp Municipal Porta; Attendance: 890 |

| 11 September 2013 | Lleida Esportiu | 2–0 | Caudal | Lleida |
| | Imaz 85'; Didac 90+2' | | | Stadium: Camp d'Esports; Attendance: 1,100 |

| 11 September 2013 | Leganés | 5–1 | Lucena | Leganés |
| 20:00 CEST | Martínez 16' (pen.); Alberto 22'; Velasco 56', 77'; Postigo 89' | | López 77' | Stadium: Estadio Municipal de Butarque |

| 11 September 2013 | Olímpic | 1–0 | Barakaldo | Xàtiva |
| 20:30 CEST | | | | Stadium: La Murta; Attendance: 1,000 |

| 11 September 2013 | Xerez | 1–1 (a.e.t.) (4–3 p) | Fuenlabrada | Jerez de la Frontera |
| 20:30 CEST | Aguilar 54' | | Molino 31' | Stadium: Estadio Municipal de Chapín |
| | Penalties |
| | Yepes (penalty scored); Seoane (penalty scored); Pineda (penalty missed); Melo (penalty scored); Aguilar (penalty scored) | | Cala (penalty scored); Aguza (penalty missed); Sánchez (penalty scored); Dorado (penalty scored); López (penalty missed) |

| 10 September 2013 | Alavés | 1–0 | Zaragoza | Vitoria |
| 19:30 CEST | Viguera 90+1' | | | Stadium: Mendizorrotza; Attendance: 7,720; Referee: Francisco Arias |

| 10 September 2013 | Mallorca | 1–4 | Alcorcón | Palma |
| | Gerard 77' | | Pacheco 22'; Martínez 36'; Plano 54', 66' | Stadium: Iberostar Stadium; Attendance: 6,375; Referee: David Medié |

| 11 September 2013 | Sabadell | 1–3 | Las Palmas | Sabadell |
| | Gato 50' (pen.) | | Masoud 14'; Asdrúbal 83'; Tato 90+1' | Stadium: Nova Creu Alta; Attendance: 2,528 |

| 11 September 2013 | Córdoba | 2–2 (a.e.t.) (12–13 p) | Deportivo La Coruña | Córdoba |
| 21:30 CEST | Caballero 23'; Abel 72' | | Seoane 49'; Fernández 59' | Stadium: Nuevo Arcángel; Attendance: 9,783 |
| | Penalties |
| | Abel (penalty missed); Caballero (penalty scored); López Silva (penalty scored); Strahman (penalty scored); Dávila (penalty scored); Pedro (penalty scored); Samu (penalty scored); Cruz (penalty scored); Bernardo (penalty scored); Juan Carlos (penalty scored); Caballero (penalty scored); López Silva (penalty scored); Strahman (penalty scored); Dávila (penalty missed) | | Seoane (penalty scored); Juan Carlos (penalty scored); Wilk (penalty scored); Fernández (penalty scored); Iglesias (penalty missed); Bergantiños (penalty scored); Manuel Pablo (penalty scored); Fornos (penalty scored); Teles (penalty scored); Fabricio (penalty scored); Seoane (penalty scored); Juan Carlos (penalty scored); Wilk (penalty scored); Fernández (penalty scored) |

| 11 September 2013 | Lugo | 1–1 (a.e.t.) (4–3 p) | Mirandés | Lugo |
| 21:00 CEST | Álvarez 23' | | Muñiz 3' | Stadium: Anxo Carro; Attendance: 3,000 |
| | Penalties |
| | Ernesto (penalty scored); Sandaza (penalty scored); Díaz (penalty scored); Rennella (penalty missed); Manu (penalty scored) | | César (penalty missed); Goiria (penalty scored); Lucena (penalty scored); Muneta (penalty scored); Agustín (penalty missed) |

| 11 September 2013 | Jaén | 1–0 | Numancia | Jaén |
| 21:00 CEST | Jona 40' | | | Stadium: Nuevo La Victoria; Attendance: 5,000 |

| 11 September 2013 | Recreativo | 3–2 (a.e.t.) | Sporting Gijón | Huelva |
| 21:00 CEST | Linares 17', 69'; Calvente 115' | | Lekić 65'; Hernández 73' | Stadium: Nuevo Colombino; Attendance: 1,487; Referee: López Acera |

| 11 September 2013 | Eibar | 1–0 | Tenerife | Eibar |
| 19:30 CEST | Vera 54' | | | Stadium: Ipurua |

| 11 September 2013 | Hércules | 2–0 | Murcia | Alicante |
| 21:00 CEST | De Lucas 2'; Muñoz 77' | | | Stadium: Rico Pérez; Attendance: 6,500 |

| 11 September 2013 | Girona | 2–1 | Ponferradina | Girona |
| | Juncà 84'; Felipe Sanchón 85' | | Robusté 43' | Stadium: Montilivi; Attendance: 2,982 |

== Third round ==
The draw was held on 13 September 2013 at 13:00 CEST in La Ciudad del Fútbol. In the draw, one team from 2013–14 Segunda División B or 2013–14 Tercera División, winner from Second round, which previously didn't receive a bye, received one. Teams from Segunda División faced each other. Remaining winners of Second round and the team which received a bye faced each other. The matches were played on 16 and 17 October 2013.

| Pot 1 Segunda División | Pot 2 Segunda División B and Tercera División |
|---|---|
| Segunda División: Alavés; Alcorcón; Deportivo de La Coruña; Eibar; Girona; Hércules; Jaén; Las Palmas; Lugo; Recreativo | Segunda División B: Algeciras; Burgos; Cartagena; Gimnàstic de Tarragona; Laudio; Leganés; Lleida; Olímpic de Xàtiva; Racing Santander; Sant Andreu * Tudelano Tercera División: Haro Deportivo; Xerez |

=== Matches ===
| 16 October 2013 | Tudelano | 1–4 | Cartagena | Tudela |
| 16:30 | Martí 86' (pen.) | Report | Megías 49'; Fede 66'; Fernando 83'; Menudo 88' | Stadium: Estadio Ciudad de Tudela; Referee: Hermosilla Alaña |

| 16 October 2013 | Real Jaén | 2–0 | Deportivo La Coruña | Jaén |
| 19:30 | Servando 71'; Juanma 77' | Report | | Stadium: Nuevo Estadio de La Victoria; Referee: Trujillo Suárez |

| 16 October 2013 | Laudio | 2–2 (a.e.t.) (7–8 p) | Olímpic de Xátiva | Laudio/Llodio |
| 20:00 | Bergara 54', 111' (pen.) | Report | Belda 72'; Franch 113' | Stadium: Estadio Ellakuri; Referee: Fuente Martín |
| | Penalties |
| | Bergara (penalty scored); Juaristi (penalty missed); Jarein (penalty scored); Larraínzar (penalty scored); Salcedo (penalty scored); Eraña (penalty scored); Lambarri (penalty scored); Beltrán (penalty scored); Casado (penalty missed) | | Vaquero (penalty missed); Pepín (penalty scored); Franch (penalty scored); Nando Ramón (penalty scored); Mosquera (penalty scored); Alcázar (penalty scored); Samu (penalty scored); Belda (penalty scored); Mendoza (penalty scored) |

| 16 October 2013 | Haro | 1–1 (a.e.t.) (1–3 p) | Algeciras | Haro |
| 20:15 | Breixo 16' | Report | Harper 15' | Stadium: Estadio El Mazo; Referee: Leo Ollo |
| | Penalties |
| | Alberto (penalty missed); Liébana (penalty scored); Ander (penalty missed); Dani Suárez (penalty missed) | | Javi Chico (penalty missed); Berlanga (penalty scored); Mario (penalty scored); Alfaro (penalty scored) |

| 16 October 2013 | Burgos | 0–1 | Gimnàstic | Burgos |
| 20:30 | | Report | Marcos 9' | Stadium: Estadio El Plantío; Referee: Pizarro Gómez |

| 16 October 2013 | Xerez | 1–3 | Lleida Esportiu | Jerez de la Frontera |
| 20:30 | Aguilar 89' (pen.) | Report | Imaz 4', 71' (pen.); Mata 76' | Stadium: Estadio Municipal de Chapín; Referee: López López |

| 16 October 2013 | Leganés | 1–1 (a.e.t.) (3–5 p) | Racing de Santander | Leganés |
| 20:45 | García 16' | Report | Soria 48' (pen.) | Stadium: Estadio Municipal de Butarque; Referee: Cid Camacho |
| | Penalties |
| | Valleros (penalty scored); Eraso (penalty scored); Ruiz (penalty missed); Jorge Alonso (penalty scored) | | Miguélez (penalty scored); Juanpe (penalty scored); Koné (penalty scored); Saúl (penalty scored); Mariano (penalty scored) |

| 16 October 2013 | Girona | 0–0 (a.e.t.) (4–2 p) | Alavés | Girona |
| 21:30 | | Report | | Stadium: Montilivi; Referee: Piñeiro Crespo |
| | Penalties |
| | Jandro (penalty scored); Jofre (penalty scored); Richy (penalty scored); Matamala (penalty scored) | | Viguera (penalty scored); Emilio (penalty scored); Guzmán (penalty missed); Ortiz (penalty missed) |

| 16 October 2013 | Recreativo de Huelva | 1–0 | Lugo | Huelva |
| 21:30 | Joselu 78' | Report | | Stadium: Estadio Nuevo Colombino; Referee: Ricardo de Burgos Bengoetxea |

| 17 October 2013 | Eibar | 1–2 (a.e.t.) | Alcorcón | Eibar |
| 19:30 | Capa 71' | Report | Vera 44' (o.g.); Alfonso 97' | Stadium: Estadio Municipal de Ipurua; Referee: Melero López |

| 17 October 2013 | Las Palmas | 3–0 | Hércules | Las Palmas |
| 21:30 | Chrisantus 10'; Momo 17' (pen.); Tana 48' | Report | | Stadium: Gran Canaria; Referee: Valdés Aller |

Notes

- (*) Sant Andreu received a bye.

== Final phase ==
The draw for the Round of 32 was held on 8 November 2013, in La Ciudad del Fútbol. In this round, all La Liga teams gained entry in the competition.

Round of 32 pairings were as follows: the seven remaining teams participating in Segunda División B and Tercera División faced the La Liga teams which qualified for European competitions, this is: four teams from Pot 1 (Segunda B and Tercera) were drawn against four teams from pot 2a (champions) and the three remaining teams in pot 1 were drawn in the same way with the pot 2b teams (Europa League). The five teams in Pot 3 (Segunda División) were drawn against five teams of the thirteen remaining teams of La Liga (Pot 4). The remaining eight teams of La Liga faced each other. Matches involving teams with different league tiers were played at home on the first leg the team in lower tier. This rule was also applied in Round of 16, but not for the Quarter-finals and Semi-finals, in which the order of legs was pure as of the order of draw.

| Pot 1 Segunda División B and Tercera División | Pot 2a Champions League | Pot 2b Europa League | Pot 3 Segunda División | Pot 4 Rest of Primera División |
|---|---|---|---|---|
| Segunda División B: Algeciras; Cartagena; Gimnàstic de Tarragona; Lleida Esportiu; Olímpic de Xàtiva; Racing de Santander; Sant Andreu | Barcelona; Real Madrid; Atlético Madrid (TH); Real Sociedad | Valencia; Betis; Sevilla | Alcorcón; Girona; Las Palmas; Real Jaén; Recreativo Huelva | Almería; Athletic Bilbao; Celta Vigo; Elche; Espanyol; Getafe; Granada; Levante; Málaga; Osasuna; Rayo Vallecano; Valladolid; Villarreal |

=== Bracket ===
Round of 32; 6/7/8 December 2013; 17/18/19 December 2013
Real Valladolid | 0 | 1 | 1
Rayo Vallecano | 0 | 3 | 3
Recreativo | 1 | 0 | 1
Levante | 0 | 4 | 4
Cartagena | 1 | 0 | 1
Barcelona | 4 | 3 | 7
Girona | 1 | 1 | 2
Getafe | 1 | 4 | 5
Algeciras | 1 | 0 | 1
Real Sociedad | 1 | 4 | 5
Villarreal | 2 | 1 | 3
Elche | 2 | 0 | 2
Racing Santander | 0 | 2 | 2
Sevilla | 1 | 0 | 1
Las Palmas | 1 | 0 | 1
Almería | 3 | 0 | 3
Alcorcón (5-4, pso) | 0 | 2 | 2
Granada | 2 | 0 | 2
Real Jaén | 2 | 0 | 2
Espanyol | 2 | 2 | 4
Olímpic | 0 | 0 | 0
Real Madrid | 0 | 2 | 2
Málaga | 3 | 1 | 4
Osasuna (a) | 3 | 1 | 4
Gimnàstic | 0 | 0 | 0
Valencia | 0 | 1 | 1
Sant Andreu | 0 | 1 | 1
Atlético Madrid | 4 | 2 | 6
Lleida Esportiu | 1 | 2 | 3
Betis | 2 | 2 | 4
Celta de Vigo | 1 | 0 | 1
Athletic Bilbao | 0 | 4 | 4

Round of 16; 7/8/9 January 2014; 14/15/16 January 2014
Rayo Vallecano | 0 | 0 | 0
Levante | 0 | 1 | 1
Barcelona | 4 | 2 | 6
Getafe | 0 | 0 | 0
Real Sociedad | 0 | 1 | 1
Villarreal | 0 | 0 | 0
Racing Santander | 1 | 2 | 3
Almería | 1 | 0 | 1
Alcorcón | 1 | 2 | 3
Espanyol | 0 | 4 | 4
Real Madrid | 2 | 2 | 4
Osasuna | 0 | 0 | 0
Valencia | 1 | 0 | 1
Atlético Madrid | 1 | 2 | 3
Betis | 1 | 0 | 1
Athletic Bilbao | 0 | 2 | 2

Quarter-finals; 21/22/23 January 2014; 28/29/30 January 2014
Levante | 1 | 1 | 2
Barcelona | 4 | 5 | 9
Real Sociedad | 3 | 0† | 3
Racing Santander | 1 | 0 | 1
Espanyol | 0 | 0 | 0
Real Madrid | 1 | 1 | 2
Atlético Madrid | 1 | 2 | 3
Athletic Bilbao | 0 | 1 | 1

Semi-finals; 5 February 2014; 11/12 February 2014
Barcelona | 2 | 1 | 3
Real Sociedad | 0 | 1 | 1
Real Madrid | 3 | 2 | 5
Atlético Madrid | 0 | 0 | 0

Final; 16 April 2014
Barcelona | 1
Real Madrid | 2

== Round of 32 ==
=== First leg ===
| 6 December 2013 | Lleida Esportiu | 1–2 | Betis | Lleida |
| 12:00 | Milla 57' | | Verdú 27' (pen.); Molina 43' | Stadium: Camp d'Esports; Attendance: 9,100; Referee: Carlos Delgado Ferreiro |

| 6 December 2013 | Villarreal | 2–2 | Elche | Villarreal |
| 16:00 | Dos Santos 22'; Aquino 90+4' | | Pelegrín 61'; Boakye 66' | Stadium: El Madrigal; Attendance: 15,000; Referee: Carlos Clos Gómez |

| 6 December 2013 | Algeciras | 1–1 | Real Sociedad | Algeciras |
| 18:00 | Alfaro 64' | | Griezmann 58' | Stadium: Estadio Nuevo Mirador; Attendance: 6,000; Referee: Miguel Ayza Gámez |

| 6 December 2013 | Racing Santander | 0–1 | Sevilla | Santander |
| 20:00 | | | Jairo 5' | Stadium: El Sardinero; Attendance: 5,000; Referee: Ignacio Iglesias Villanueva |

| 6 December 2013 | Cartagena | 1–4 | Barcelona | Cartagena |
| 22:00 | Fernando 17' | | Pedro 36', 76'; Fàbregas 43'; Dongou 90' | Stadium: Estadio Cartagonova; Attendance: 13,126; Referee: Carlos del Cerro Grande |

| 6 December 2013 | Valladolid | 0–0 | Rayo Vallecano | Valladolid |
| 22:00 | | | | Stadium: José Zorrilla; Attendance: 7,037; Referee: Mateu Lahoz |

| 7 December 2013 | Sant Andreu | 0–4 | Atlético Madrid | Barcelona |
| 16:00 | | | García 12'; Turan 20', 55'; Villa 85' | Stadium: Camp Municipal Narcís Sala; Attendance: 6,563; Referee: Alberto Undiano Mallenco |

| 7 December 2013 | Girona | 1–1 | Getafe | Girona |
| 18:00 | Timor 15' | | Marica 37' | Stadium: Estadi Montilivi |

| 7 December 2013 | Celta de Vigo | 1–0 | Athletic Bilbao | Vigo |
| 20:00 | Mina 71' | | | Stadium: Balaídos |

| 7 December 2013 | Recreativo | 1–0 | Levante | Huelva |
| 22:00 | Ruymán 89' | | | Stadium: Estadio Nuevo Colombino |

| 7 December 2013 | Olímpic | 0–0 | Real Madrid | Valencia |
| 22:00 | | | | Stadium: La Murta; Referee: David Fernández Borbalán |

| 8 December 2013 | Alcorcón | 0–2 | Granada | Alcorcón |
| 12:00 | | | Ighalo 30', 81' | Stadium: Estadio Municipal de Santo Domingo |

| 8 December 2013 | Gimnàstic | 0–0 | Valencia | Tarragona |
| 17:00 | | | | Stadium: Nou Estadi de Tarragona |

| 8 December 2013 | Las Palmas | 1–3 | Almería | Las Palmas |
| 17:00 | Nauzet 73' | | Díaz 14', 25' (pen.); Vidal 20' | Stadium: Gran Canaria |

| 8 December 2013 | Real Jaén | 2–2 | Espanyol | Jaén |
| 19:00 | Sidnei 64' (o.g.); Jozabed 70' | | D. López 44'; Stuani 87' | Stadium: Nuevo Estadio de La Victoria |

| 8 December 2013 | Málaga | 3–3 | Osasuna | Málaga |
| 21:00 | Sánchez 31'; Antunes 37'; Juanmi 47' | | Torres 57'; Onwu 61'; Armenteros 77' | Stadium: La Rosaleda |

=== Second leg ===
| 17 December 2013 | Elche | 0–1 (2–3 agg.) | Villarreal | Elche |
| 20:00 | | Report | Perbet 55' | Stadium: Martínez Valero; Attendance: 17,307; Referee: Alfonso Álvarez Izquierdo |

| 17 December 2013 | Getafe | 4–1 (5–2 agg.) | Girona | Getafe |
| 20:00 | Sarabia 1'; Colunga 5' (pen.); Lafita 35'; López 73' | Report | Jandro 59' (pen.) | Stadium: Coliseum Alfonso Pérez; Attendance: 2,000; Referee: Ignacio Iglesias Villanueva |

| 17 December 2013 | Levante | 4–0 (4–1 agg.) | Recreativo | Valencia |
| 20:00 | Simão Mate 3'; Rubén 17'; Ivanschitz 50'; Camarasa 53' | Report | | Stadium: Ciutat de València; Attendance: 7,200; Referee: Jesús Gil Manzano |

| 17 December 2013 | Osasuna | 1–1 (4–4 (a) agg.) | Málaga | Pamplona |
| 20:00 | Weligton 1' (o.g.) | Report | Eliseu 61' | Stadium: El Sadar; Attendance: 10,538; Referee: Miguel Ayza Gámez |

| 17 December 2013 | Barcelona | 3–0 (7–1 agg.) | Cartagena | Barcelona |
| 22:00 | Pedro 31'; Sánchez 68' (o.g.); Neymar 88' | Report | | Stadium: Camp Nou; Attendance: 47,280; Referee: Pedro Pérez Montero |

| 17 December 2013 | Granada | 0–2 (a.e.t.) (2–2 agg.) (4–5 p) | Alcorcón | Granada |
| 22:00 | | Report | Verdés 41'; Nagore 81' | Stadium: Los Cármenes; Attendance: 13,000; Referee: Eduardo Prieto Iglesias |
| | Penalties |
| | Recio (penalty scored); Yebda (penalty scored); Piti (penalty missed); Ighalo (penalty scored); Riki (penalty scored); Murillo (penalty missed) | | Mikel (penalty scored); Juli (penalty scored); Nagore (penalty scored); Sanz (penalty missed); Quini (penalty scored); Jony (penalty scored) |

| 18 December 2013 | Real Sociedad | 4–0 (5–1 agg.) | Algeciras | San Sebastián |
| 19:30 | Ros 40'; Seferovic 66'; Griezmann 70'; Vela 74' | Report | | Stadium: Anoeta; Referee: César Muñiz Fernández |

| 18 December 2013 | Atlético Madrid | 2–1 (6–1 agg.) | Sant Andreu | Madrid |
| 19:30 | Héctor 79'; Alderweireld 90+2' | Report | Carroza 14' | Stadium: Vicente Calderón; Referee: Juan Martínez Munuera |

| 18 December 2013 | Real Betis | 2–2 (4–3 agg.) | Lleida Esportiu | Seville |
| 19:30 | Paulão 5'; Amaya 10' | Report | Monforte 38'; Mata 55' | Stadium: Benito Villamarín; Referee: Alberto Undiano Mallenco |

| 18 December 2013 | Almería | 0–0 (3–1 agg.) | Las Palmas | Almería |
| 19:30 | | Report | | Stadium: Juegos Mediterráneos; Referee: Carlos Delgado Ferreiro |

| 18 December 2013 | Real Madrid | 2–0 (2–0 agg.) | Olímpic | Madrid |
| 21:30 | Illarramendi 16'; Di María 28' (pen.) | Report | | Stadium: Santiago Bernabéu; Referee: José Antonio Teixeira Vitienes |

| 18 December 2013 | Sevilla | 0–2 (1–2 agg.) | Racing Santander | Seville |
| 21:30 | | Report | Miguélez 63' (pen.); Koné 90' | Stadium: Ramón Sánchez Pizjuán; Referee: José González González |

| 19 December 2013 | Espanyol | 2–0 (4–2 agg.) | Real Jaén | Barcelona |
| 19:30 | Simão 16'; Sidnei 85' | | | Stadium: Cornellà-El Prat; Referee: Carlos Clos Gómez |

| 19 December 2013 | Valencia | 1–0 (1–0 agg.) | Gimnàstic | Valencia |
| 19:30 | Alcácer 37' | | | Stadium: Mestalla; Referee: Carlos del Cerro Grande |

| 19 December 2013 | Rayo Vallecano | 3–1 (3–1 agg.) | Real Valladolid | Madrid |
| 19:30 | Adrián 32', 87'; Bueno 89' | | Guerra 27' | Stadium: Campo de Vallecas; Referee: Xavier Estrada Fernández |

| 19 December 2013 | Athletic Bilbao | 4–0 (4–1 agg.) | Celta de Vigo | Bilbao |
| 21:30 | Muniain 20', 80'; Susaeta 44'; Aduriz 86' | | | Stadium: San Mamés; Referee: Fernando Teixeira Vitienes |

== Round of 16 ==
=== First leg ===
| 7 January 2014 | Valencia | 1–1 | Atlético Madrid | Valencia |
| 22:00 | Postiga 90+3' | Report | García 72' | Stadium: Mestalla; Referee: Carlos Clos Gómez |

| 8 January 2014 | Alcorcón | 1–0 | Espanyol | Alcorcón |
| 20:00 | Pacheco 72' | Report | | Stadium: Estadio Municipal de Santo Domingo; Referee: César Muñiz Fernández |

| 8 January 2014 | Real Betis | 1–0 | Athletic Bilbao | Seville |
| 20:00 | Castro 42' | Report | | Stadium: Benito Villamarín; Referee: Alfonso Álvarez Izquierdo |

| 8 January 2014 | Barcelona | 4–0 | Getafe | Barcelona |
| 22:00 | Fàbregas 9', 62' (pen.); Messi 90', 90+3' | Report | | Stadium: Camp Nou; Referee: José González González |

| 8 January 2014 | Racing Santander | 1–1 | Almería | Santander |
| 22:00 | Concha 65' | Report | Corona 26' | Stadium: El Sardinero; Referee: Ignacio Iglesias Villanueva |

| 9 January 2014 | Real Sociedad | 0–0 | Villarreal | San Sebastián |
| 19:30 | | Report | | Stadium: Anoeta; Referee: Alberto Undiano Mallenco |

| 9 January 2014 | Real Madrid | 2–0 | Osasuna | Madrid |
| 21:30 | Benzema 19'; Jesé 60' | Report | | Stadium: Santiago Bernabéu; Referee: Pedro Pérez Montero |

| 9 January 2014 | Rayo Vallecano | 0–0 | Levante | Vallecas |
| 21:30 | | Report | | Stadium: Campo de Vallecas; Referee: José Antonio Teixeira Vitienes |

=== Second leg ===
| 14 January 2014 | Almería | 0–2 (1–3 agg.) | Racing Santander | Almería |
| 19:30 | | Report | Mariano 62'; Durán 79' | Stadium: Estadio de los Juegos Mediterráneos; Referee: Hernández Hernández |

| 14 January 2014 | Atlético Madrid | 2–0 (3–1 agg.) | Valencia | Madrid |
| 21:30 | Godín 51'; García 89' | Report | | Stadium: Vicente Calderón Stadium; Referee: Xavier Estrada Fernández |

| 15 January 2014 | Athletic Bilbao | 2–0 (2–1 agg.) | Real Betis | Bilbao |
| 19:30 | Rico 23', 67' | Report | | Stadium: San Mamés Stadium; Referee: Carlos del Cerro Grande |

| 15 January 2014 | Espanyol | 4–2 (4–3 agg.) | Alcorcón | Barcelona |
| 19:30 | Simão 10'; García 23' (pen.); Álvarez 84'; Pizzi 87' | Report | Plano 4'; Javito 80' | Stadium: Cornellà-El Prat; Referee: Miguel Ayza Gámez |

| 15 January 2014 | Levante | 1–0 (1–0 agg.) | Rayo Vallecano | Valencia |
| 21:30 | Barral 43' | Report | | Stadium: Ciutat de València; Referee: David Fernández Borbalán |

| 15 January 2014 | Osasuna | 0–2 (0–4 agg.) | Real Madrid | Pamplona |
| 21:30 | | Report | Ronaldo 21'; Di María 56' | Stadium: El Sadar; Referee: Antonio Mateu Lahoz |

| 16 January 2014 | Villarreal | 0–1 (0–1 agg.) | Real Sociedad | Villarreal |
| 13:00 | | Report | Ros 32' | Stadium: El Madrigal; Attendance: 15000; Referee: Eduardo Prieto Iglesias |

| 16 January 2014 | Getafe | 0–2 (0–6 agg.) | Barcelona | Getafe |
| 22:00 | | Report | Messi 44', 63' | Stadium: Coliseum Alfonso Pérez; Referee: Jesús Gil Manzano |

== Quarter-finals ==
=== First leg ===
| 21 January 2014 | Espanyol | 0–1 | Real Madrid | Barcelona |
| 21:00 | | Report | Benzema 25' | Stadium: Cornellà-El Prat; Attendance: 30,837; Referee: Carlos Clos Gómez |

| 22 January 2014 | Real Sociedad | 3–1 | Racing Santander | San Sebastián |
| 20:00 | González 4', 33'; Vela 62' | Report | Koné 83' | Stadium: Anoeta Stadium; Attendance: 18,911; Referee: Carlos Velasco Carballo |

| 22 January 2014 | Levante | 1–4 | Barcelona | Valencia |
| 22:00 | El Zhar 31' | Report | Juanfran 53' (o.g.); Tello 60', 81', 86' | Stadium: Ciutat de València; Attendance: 18,852; Referee: Hernández Hernández |

| 23 January 2014 | Atlético Madrid | 1–0 | Athletic Bilbao | Madrid |
| 21:00 | Godín 41' | Report | | Stadium: Vicente Calderón Stadium; Referee: David Fernández Borbalán |

=== Second leg ===
| 28 January 2014 | Real Madrid | 1–0 (2–0 agg.) | Espanyol | Madrid |
| 21:00 | Jesé 7' | Report | | Stadium: Santiago Bernabéu Stadium; Attendance: 54,500; Referee: Fernando Teixeira Vitienes |

| 29 January 2014 | Athletic Bilbao | 1–2 (1–3 agg.) | Atlético Madrid | Bilbao |
| 20:00 | Aduriz 42' | Report | García 55'; Costa 86' | Stadium: San Mamés Stadium; Attendance: 34,000; Referee: Antonio Mateu Lahoz |

| 29 January 2014 | Barcelona | 5–1 (9–2 agg.) | Levante | Barcelona |
| 21:00 | Adriano 28'; Puyol 44'; Sánchez 50', 52'; Fàbregas 68' | Report | Roberto 9' (o.g.) | Stadium: Camp Nou; Attendance: 25,551; Referee: Alberto Undiano Mallenco |

| 30 January 2014 | Racing Santander | 0–0† (1–3 agg.) | Real Sociedad | Santander |
| 20:00 | | Report | | Stadium: Campos de Sport de El Sardinero; Referee: Jesús Gil Manzano |
Note: Match suspended in 1st minute at 0-0 due to Racing Santander's refusal to play in a dispute over unpaid wages and demand that the club's board and president resign.

== Semi-finals ==
=== First leg ===
| 5 February 2014 | Real Madrid | 3–0 | Atlético Madrid | Madrid |
| 20:00 | Pepe 17'; Jesé 57'; Di María 73' | Report | | Stadium: Santiago Bernabéu; Attendance: 74,278; Referee: Carlos Clos Gómez |

| 5 February 2014 | Barcelona | 2–0 | Real Sociedad | Barcelona |
| 22:00 | Busquets 44'; Zubikarai 60' (o.g.) | Report | | Stadium: Camp Nou; Attendance: 38,505; Referee: José González González |

=== Second leg ===
| 11 February 2014 | Atlético Madrid | 0–2 (0–5 agg.) | Real Madrid | Madrid |
| 21:00 | | Report | Ronaldo 7' (pen.), 16' (pen.) | Stadium: Vicente Calderón; Attendance: 40,000; Referee: Alberto Undiano Mallenco |

| 12 February 2014 | Real Sociedad | 1–1 (1–3 agg.) | Barcelona | San Sebastián |
| 22:00 | Griezmann 87' | Report | Messi 27' | Stadium: Anoeta; Attendance: 28,153; Referee: Fernando Teixeira Vitienes |

== Final ==
15 April 2014
21:30 CEST

| Real Madrid | 2–1 | Barcelona |
|---|---|---|
| Di María 11'; Bale 85' | Report | Bartra 68' |

Mestalla, Valencia
Attendance: 52,953
Referee: Mateu Lahoz (Valencian committee)

== Top goalscorers ==
| Rank | Player | Club | Goals |
|---|---|---|---|
| 1 | (Argentina) Lionel Messi | Barcelona | 5 |
| 2 | (Spain) Cesc Fàbregas | Barcelona | 4 |
| 2 | (Argentina) Ángel Di María | Real Madrid | 4 |
| 2 | (Spain) Raúl García | Atlético Madrid | 4 |
| 5 | (France) Antoine Griezmann | Real Sociedad | 3 |
| 5 | (Portugal) Cristiano Ronaldo | Real Madrid | 3 |
| 5 | (Spain) Cristian Tello | Barcelona | 3 |
| 5 | (Spain) Jesús Imaz | Lleida | 3 |
| 5 | (Spain) Jesé | Real Madrid | 3 |
| 5 | (Ivory Coast) Mamadou Koné | Racing Santander | 3 |
| 5 | (Spain) Pedro | Barcelona | 3 |
| 5 | (Spain) Óscar Plano | Alcorcón | 3 |
| 5 | (Spain) Abdón Prats | Burgos | 3 |

== See also ==
- List of Spanish football transfers summer 2013
- 2013–14 La Liga
- 2013–14 Segunda División
- 2013–14 Segunda División B
- 2013–14 Tercera División
