= Seoane =

- Pronunciation: [se̯ɔˈanɪ]

Origin
- Language: Galician
- Meaning: Saint John
- Region of origin: Galicia

Other names
- Variant form: Seivane

Seoane is a toponymic surname of Galician origin, meaning "Saint John". Notable people with the name include:

- Antonio Vega de Seoane (1887–1947), Spanish engineer, businessman and politician
- Consuelo Seoane (1876–1964), American military officer
- Diego Seoane (Spanish footballer) (born 1988), Spanish footballer
- Diego Seoane (Uruguayan footballer) (born 1976), Uruguayan footballer
- Edgardo Seoane (1903–1978), Peruvian engineer, agronomist and politician
- Enrique Seoane Ros (1915–1980), Peruvian architect
- Fernando Seoane (born 1983), Spanish footballer
- Gerardo Seoane (born 1978), Swiss footballer
- Iván Martín Seoane (born 1987), Spanish swimmer and coach
- Jaime Seoane (born 1997), Spanish footballer
- José María Seoane (1913–1989), Spanish actor
- Kenia Seoane Lopez (born 1974), American lawyer and judge
- Luís Seoane (1910–1979), Argentine-Spanish lithographer and artist
- Manny Seoane (born 1955), American baseball player
- Manuel Seoane (1902–1975), Argentine footballer
- Manuel Burga Seoane (born 1957), Peruvian lawyer and football administrator
- Manuel Velarde Seoane (1833–1900), Peruvian military general and politician
- María Seoane (1948–2023), Argentine journalist, writer, and film director
- Mariana Seoane (born 1976), Mexican actress, model and singer
- Sito Seoane (born 1989), American soccer player
- Toni Seoane (born 1989), Spanish footballer
