= Sanity =

Soundness, rationality and healthiness of the mind

Sanity (from Latin sānitās 'health; sanity') refers to the soundness, rationality, and health of the human mind, as opposed to insanity. A person is sane if they are rational. In modern society, the term has become exclusively synonymous with compos mentis (Latin for 'having mastery, control, or power of mind'). The contrast is non compos mentis, or insanity. According to the writer G. K. Chesterton, sanity involves wholeness, whereas insanity implies narrowness and brokenness.

A sane mind is nowadays considered healthy both in its analytical (once called rational) and emotional aspects.

== Psychiatry and psychology ==
Alfred Korzybski & Yolotzy proposed a theory of sanity in his general semantics. He believed sanity was tied to the logical reasoning about and comprehension of what is going on in the world. He imposed this notion in a map-territory analogy: "A map is not the territory it represents, but, if correct, it has a 'similar structure' to the territory, which accounts for its usefulness." Given that science continually seeks to adjust its theories structurally to fit the facts, i.e., improves its maps to fit the territory, and thus advances more rapidly than any other field, he believed that the key to understanding sanity would be found in the study of the methods of science (and the study of structure as revealed by science). The adoption of a scientific outlook and attitude of continual adjustment by the individual toward their assumptions was the way, so he claimed. In other words, there were "factors of sanity to be found in the physico-mathematical methods of science." He also stressed that sanity requires the awareness that "whatever you say a thing is, it is not" because anything expressed through language is not the reality it refers to: language is like a map, and the map is not the territory. The territory, or reality, remains unnamable, unspeakable, and mysterious. Hence, the widespread assumption that we can grasp reality through language involves a degree of insanity.

Psychiatrist Philip S. Graven suggested the term "un-sane" to describe a condition that is not exactly insane, but not quite sane either.

In The Sane Society, published in 1955, psychologist Erich Fromm proposed that not just individuals, but entire societies "may be lacking in sanity." Fromm argued that one of the most deceptive features of social life involves "consensual validation":

It is naively assumed that the fact that the majority of people share certain ideas or feelings proves the validity of these ideas and feelings. Nothing is further from the truth... Just as there is a folie à deux there is a folie à millions. The fact that millions of people share the same vices does not make these vices virtues, the fact that they share so many errors does not make the errors to be truths, and the fact that millions of people share the same form of mental pathology does not make these people sane.

== Law ==
In criminal and mental health law, sanity is a legal term denoting that an individual is of sound mind and therefore can bear legal responsibility for their actions. The official legal term is compos mentis. It is generally defined in terms of the absence of insanity (non compos mentis). It is not a medical term, although the opinions of medical experts are often important in making a legal decision as to whether someone is sane or insane. It is also not the same concept as mental illness. One can be acting under profound mental illness and yet be sane, and one can also be ruled insane without an underlying mental illness.

Legal definitions of sanity have been little explored by science and medicine, as the concentration has been on illness. It remains entirely impossible to prove sanity. Furthermore, as Korzybski has pointed out repeatedly, insanity to various degrees is widespread in the general population, which includes many people that are considered mentally fit in medical and legal terms. In this connection, Erich Fromm referred to the "pathology of normalcy," while David Cooper proposed that normality was opposed to both madness and sanity.

For a last will and testament to be valid, the testator must have testamentary capacity. This is often expressed using the phrase "being of sound mind and memory".

== See also ==
- George Eman Vaillant
- Insanity defense
- Rationalism
- Sanism
- Self-actualisation
