= Francisco Pineda =

Francisco Pineda may refer to:

- Francisco Pineda (footballer, born 1959), Spanish football forward
- Fran Pineda (born 1988), Spanish football forward
- Francisco Pineda (environmentalist), Salvadoran environmentalist
