= Novillo =

Novillo is a surname. Notable people with the surname include:

- Edmundo Novillo (born 1963), Bolivian lawyer, politician and Governor of Cochabamba
- Harry Novillo (born 1992), Martiniquais footballer
- Joaquín Novillo (born 1998), Argentine footballer
- José María Cruz Novillo (born 1936), Spanish sculptor, engraver, painter and designer
- Mariano Sanz Novillo (born 1989), Spanish footballer

== See also ==
- Lake Novillo, lake in Sonora, Mexico, near the city of San Pedro de la Cueva
