= Oier Larraínzar =

Spanish footballer

Personal information
- Full name: Oier Larraínzar Arzallus
- Date of birth: 6 October 1977 (age 49)
- Place of birth: San Sebastián, Spain
- Height: 1.84 m (6 ft 1/2 in)
- Position: Centre back

Senior career*
Years	Team	Apps	(Gls)
1996–1998	UPV		
1998–2002	Real Sociedad B	100	(4)
2000–2001	→ Eibar (loan)	26	(2)
2002–2009	Real Unión	189	(2)
2005–2006	→ Huesca (loan)	36	(1)
2010–2014	Laudio	150	(3)
Total		501	(12)
- * Club domestic league appearances and goals

Oier Larraínzar Arzallus (born 6 October 1977 in San Sebastián, Gipuzkoa) is a Spanish retired footballer who played as a central defender.
