= Deportivo Alavés C =

Alavés C
- Full name: Deportivo Alavés C, S.A.D.
- Nickname: Zaldiaran
- Founded: 1980 as AD Zaldiaran; 2022 (refounded)
- Ground: José Luis Compañón, Vitoria, Basque Country, Spain
- Capacity: 2,500
- Chairman: Alfonso Fernández de Trocóniz
- Manager: Germán Beltrán
- League: Tercera Federación – Group 4
- 2025–26: Tercera Federación – Group 4, 9th of 18
| Home colours | Away colours | Third colours |

Deportivo Alavés C, S.A.D., usually known as Alavés C, is a Spanish football team based in Vitoria-Gasteiz, in the autonomous community of Basque Country. Founded in 1980 as AD Zaldiaran, they are the second reserve team of Deportivo Alavés, and play in the Tercera Federación – Group 4.

The team's home kit was blue and white-striped shirt, blue shorts and white socks.

== History ==
AD Zaldiaran was founded in 1980 and throughout most of their history was an independent club, but linked to the Alavés grassroots fields. The club only made their debut in the regional categories in the 1996–97 season, achieving promotion to the Regional Preferente de Álava on their first participation in the Primera Regional de Álava. Three years later, in 2000, the team win the Preferente and achieve promotion to Tercera División.

After their promotion, Zaldiaran were fully incorporated to Deportivo Alavés' structure, being renamed to Deportivo Alavés C. The side competed in the fourth tier for three back-to-back seasons until 2002–03, when they suffered relegation.

Thereafter a four-year partnership was agreed with another local team, Club San Ignacio (a modest team from Vitoria who had played the previous season (2002-03) also in the fourth division). The affiliate became known as Alavés C-San Ignacio maintaining the Alavés name but playing in San Ignacio colours and usually hosting fixtures at their home ground Adurtzabal. When this entity was relegated in 2004–05, the Alavés link was discontinued.

San Ignacio continued operating independently and have since returned to the Tercera level twice (on each occasion their opponents included the other reserve side of Alavés, with both teams being relegated in 2008–09). Later on, San Ignacio rejoined Alavés' structure as their second reserve team.

On 1 June 2022, Alavés reactivated their C-team after absorbing Adurtzabal Club de Fútbol, a team founded in 2012 which had just been promoted to the División de Honor de Álava; the link with San Ignacio, the second reserve team until then, was discontinued.

== Season to season ==
- As AD Zaldiaran

| Season | Tier | Division | Place | Copa del Rey |
|---|---|---|---|---|
| 1996–97 | 6 | 1ª Reg. | 1st | |
| 1997–98 | 5 | Reg. Pref. | 7th | |
| 1998–99 | 5 | Reg. Pref. | 2nd | |
| 1999–2000 | 5 | Reg. Pref. | 1st | |

- As Deportivo Alavés C

| Season | Tier | Division | Place |
|---|---|---|---|
| 2000–01 | 4 | 3ª | 9th |
| 2001–02 | 4 | 3ª | 8th |
| 2002–03 | 4 | 3ª | 16th |
| 2003–04 | 4 | 3ª | 16th |
| 2004–05 | 4 | 3ª | 19th |

- As Adurtzabal CF

| Season | Tier | Division | Place | Copa del Rey |
|---|---|---|---|---|
| 2021–22 | 7 | 1ª Reg. | 1st | |

- As Deportivo Alavés C

| Season | Tier | Division | Place |
|---|---|---|---|
| 2022–23 | 6 | Div. Hon. | 1st |
| 2023–24 | 5 | 3ª Fed. | 12th |
| 2024–25 | 5 | 3ª Fed. | 6th |
| 2025–26 | 5 | 3ª Fed. | 9th |
| 2026–27 | 5 | 3ª Fed. | |

- 5 seasons in Tercera División
- 4 seasons in Tercera Federación

== Notable players ==
- (Spain) Ángel Sánchez
- (Spain) Iñigo Calderón
- (Spain) Javier Carpio
- (Spain) Gaizka Toquero
