= Gorka Luariz =

Equatoguinean footballer (born 1992)

Personal information
- Full name: Gorka Patricio Luariz-Ayerdi Rona
- Date of birth: 20 December 1992 (age 33)
- Place of birth: Zaragoza, Spain
- Height: 1.80 m (5 ft 11 in)
- Position: Forward

Team information
- Current team: Vasconia

Youth career
- 2009–2010: Antiguoko
- 2010–2012: Athletic Bilbao

Senior career*
Years	Team	Apps	(Gls)
2011–2012	→ Real Unión B (loan)		
2012–2013	Lagun Onak	32	(14)
2013–2014	Laudio	20	(2)
2014	Tudelano	3	(0)
2015	Arenas	11	(1)
2015–2016	Gernika	15	(1)
2016	Pasaia	1	(1)
2016–2017	Zamudio	26	(7)
2017–2018	Cerceda	36	(7)
2018–2019	Leioa	36	(6)
2019–2021	Arenas	7	(0)
2021–2022	Lagun Onak	3	(1)
2022–2024	Pasaia	17	(2)
2024–	Vasconia	8	(0)

International career
2018	Equatorial Guinea	2	(0)
- * Club domestic league appearances and goals as of 16 November 2024

Gorka Patricio Luariz-Ayerdi Rona (born 20 December 1992) is a professional footballer who plays as a forward for División de Honor de Guipúzcoa club Vasconia. Born in Spain, he played for the Equatorial Guinea national team.

== Early life ==
Luariz was born in Zaragoza, Aragon to a Basque father and an Equatoguinean mother, a Bubi from Malabo. He spent his childhood in Sangüesa, Vitoria-Gasteiz and San Sebastián.

== Club career ==
He was called up by the Basque Country national team at youth levels.

Having developed at Antiguoko, he was signed by Athletic Bilbao in 2010, but suffered a cruciate ligament knee injury in his maiden campaign in their youth system and was released after an unremarkable loan with the reserve team of Real Unión.

Since then he moved around several teams, most located in the Basque Country, in the third and fourth tiers of Spanish football.

== International career ==
Luariz made his national team debut as a substitute against Madagascar in the 2019 Africa Cup of Nations qualification.

== Personal life ==
At age 17, Luariz had a sentimental problem which caused him to lose all his body hair. Luariz's middle name, Patricio, is a tribute to his grandfather.
