= Óliver Bocos =

Former Spanish footballer

Óliver
Personal information
- Full name: Óliver Manuel Bocos González
- Date of birth: 3 September 1982 (age 44)
- Place of birth: Puerto del Rosario, Spain
- Height: 1.80 m (5 ft 11 in)
- Position: Left back

Youth career
- Corralejo
- 1997–2001: Levante

Senior career*
| Years | Team | Apps | (Gls) |
| 2001–2006 | Levante B | | |
| 2001 | Levante | 1 | (0) |
| 2006–2008 | Jaén | 64 | (1) |
| 2008–2009 | Racing Ferrol | 30 | (0) |
| 2010 | Lucena | 6 | (0) |
| 2010–2011 | Vélez | 10 | (0) |
| 2011–2012 | Corralejo | | |
| 2012– | El Palo | 40 | (2) |
- * Club domestic league appearances and goals as of 21 November 2013

Óliver Manuel Bocos González (born 3 September 1982), known as simply Óliver or Oli, is a Spanish footballer who last played professional football for Vélez CF as a left defender, retiring in 2016.

== Club career ==
Born in Puerto del Rosario, Fuerteventura, Canary Islands, Óliver graduated from Levante UD's youth system, making his senior debuts with the reserves in the 2001–02 season, in the Tercera División. On 7 November 2001 he made his professional debut with the Valencian, playing the entire second half of a 0–7 away loss against SD Eibar in the Segunda División.

In the following years Óliver competed in the Segunda División B but also in the fourth level, representing Real Jaén, Racing de Ferrol, Lucena CF, Vélez CF, CD Corralejo and CD El Palo. With the latter he achieved promotion to division three in 2013, appearing in 32 matches and scoring once.
