= Joseph Cheesman Thompson =

American career medical officer in the US Navy

'Snake' Thompson, 1917

Joseph Cheesman Thompson (1874–1943) was an American career medical officer in the United States Navy who attained the rank of commander before retirement in 1929. His foes called him "Crazy Thompson", but to friends he was known as "Snake", a nickname derived from his expertise in the field of herpetology.

== Early life and education ==
Thompson grew up in Japan as the son of a missionary. In 1892, Thompson graduated from the Columbia Medical School.

== Service during the Boxer Rebellion ==
Thompson joined the US Navy in 1897. On May 18, 1900, he was detached from the USS Bennington, a gunboat that saw service in Hawaii, the Philippines and along the Pacific coasts of North and South America, and he was ordered to Mare Island Hospital for some unspecified treatment.

In a dispatch dated August 20, 1900, USMC Major William P. Biddle lists "Asst. Surg. J. C. Thompson, U.S.N.", as part of the First Regiment United States Marines China Relief Expedition, which was sent to Peking to rescue foreigners and Chinese Christians who were under attack by the "Boxers" or "Fists of Righteous Harmony". Another dispatch of the same date commends J.C. Thompson, among others, as "alert and zealous in caring for those overcome by the heat and the wounded".

On December 22, 1900, The New York Times reported, "Assistant surgeon J. C. Thompson is detached from Cavite Hospital and ordered to the Solace." (The USS Solace was a hospital ship used at first during the Spanish–American War.)

By 1903, Thompson had passed his assistant status and was assigned to the Navy Yard at Puget Sound.

== American spies in Japan ==
In February 1908, Thompson was assigned to special duty with the War Department. On January 8, 1909, papers discussed the "mystery in navy" over his whereabouts. Thompson was recruited by friend Consuelo Seoane to chart potential invasion routes of Japan while posing as South African naturalists. Thompson used the pseudonym Victor Kühne, while Seoane posed as John G. Nurse. In June 1909, the pair scouted Hong Kong's fortifications as dry run before proceeding to Japan.

Sociologist William Sims Bainbridge has recounted this version of Thompson's Navy espionage adventures:

"[Louis Livingston Seaman]'s brother-in-law Consuelo Andrew Seoane served as cartographer during the Philippine Insurrection and in 1909–1911 was a spy for the United States Army, traveling under a pseudonym throughout the Japanese Empire with Joseph "Snake" Thompson, pretending to be herpetologists studying coastal reptiles and amphibians, but actually charting invasion routes."

Seoane's widow Rhoda has written of Commander Thompson:

"One day they received a courtesy call from a visiting Japanese natural history professor. Thompson showed the professor's card to Consuelo with a grimace and said that our new caller has undoubtedly been sent by the police to inquire into our knowledge of natural history. "I will dispatch him, after giving him an inferiority complex regarding his particular profession." After this all such visits terminated."

Thompson authored a variety of naturalist papers:

- "Fish Fauna of the Tortugas Archipelago". (1904)
- "Description of a new species of sea snake from the Philippine Islands with a note on the palatine teeth in the proteroglypha". (1908) (with J. Van Denburgh)
- "Description of a new genus and species of salamander from Japan". (1912)
- "Notes on Serpents in the Family Colubridae". (1913) Natural Sciences of Philadelphia
- "Contributions to the Synonymy of Serpents in the family Elapidae". (1913) Academy of Natural Sciences
- "The variation exhibited by mainland and island specimens of the Hibakari snake, Natrix vibakari (Boie)". (1914) US National Museum,
- "Further contributions to the anatomy of the ophidia". (1914) Proceedings of the Zoological Society of London
- "The variation exhibited by Thamnophis ordinoides (Baird and Girard) a garter snake inhabiting the San Francisco peninsula". (1917)

== San Diego ==
In 1915, Thompson was interviewed on the subject of trepannation among indigenous peoples in Peru.

Thompson helped found the Zoological Society of San Diego, and was its vice president previous to 1917, at which point he was called to serve again as a doctor in the US Navy.

"Commander J. C. Thompson was a neurosurgeon assigned to Navy Hospital. Entomology was a hobby, and he also showed an interest in the herpetofauna of San Diego County. He offered to supervise the construction of a reptile house, announcing that he already had plans for one. He was elected vice-president of the Zoological Society, and was appointed with Dr. Harry Wegeforth and Frank Stephens to draw up the Articles of Incorporation and the By-Laws. Thompson is given credit for much of the planning of the Zoo's education program. In a news article he wrote in 1916, he described the arrangement of exhibits as they would appear in Balboa Park's Pepper Grove, an early choice for the Zoo's location. He also announced that there would be guidebooks, text books and free lectures. After having been presented with a Kodiak bear lent to the Zoo by Captain Prideaux of the U. S. collier "Nanshan". Thompson announced that the first lecture would be about bears. It must have been an interesting lecture. "Caesar", the Kodiak, had been kept as a mascot and pet by the crew of the Nanshan until she got too large and unruly. According to Dr. Wegeforth, none of them knew anything about crating bears, and didn't know quite how to get her to the Zoo. With no truck, and no expertise in handling bears, it was decided to put a collar and chain around the bear's neck and let her ride to the Zoo with Thompson, seated beside him in the front of his car."

In 1918, Thompson was stationed at an Atlantic port and loaned his extensive library to the Oakland Public Museum.

== Recruiting trip ==
In 1919, a Salem, Oregon, newspaper reported Thompson's arrival as part of a Navy recruitment drive. Thompson addressed multiple groups in the city.

Thompson spent two years in Portland, after which he was detached from the recruiting station and posted to Guam, taking with him a "tame rattlesnake" named Crotellus

== Psychoanalytic career ==
In the early 1920s, Thompson became interested in Freudian psychoanalysis and he underwent analysis with Dr. Philip S. Graven in 1923. In 1924, Thompson became vice-president of the Washington Psychoanalytic Association, but by 1936, after criticizing the American psychoanalytic establishment for straying too far from Freud, he was no longer listed as a member of the association. It was Thompson's contention that lay analysts should be given as much importance in the psychoanalytic field as physicians. Sigmund Freud's collected correspondence in the US Library of Congress does contain a 1923 postcard to Joe Tom Sun, listed in the collection as an alias for Dr. Thompson of Baltimore, M.D.

In Guam, Commander Thompson became involved in archaeological explorations, and the 1923 Journal of the Polynesian Society reported that due to his efforts "much information has been obtained about the culture of the vanished Chamorros, a flourishing race at the time of Magellan's visit in 1521."

Also while in Guam, under the pseudonym "Joe Tom Sun", Thompson published three articles in the Psychoanalytic Review:

- "Symbolism in the Chinese Written Language" (1923)
- "Psychology in Primitive Buddhism" (1924)
- "Symbolism in the Sumerian Written Language" (1924)

His other published works on psychiatry:

- "Psychoanalytic Literature" (1923) (as J. C. Thompson)
- "The Psychoanalyst and his Work" (1924) (as J. C. Thompson)
- "Tro-pical Neurasthenia: A Deprivation Neurosis" (1924) (as J. C. C. Thompson)
- "Desertion: Observations of a Psychoanalyst" (1924) (as J. C. C. Thompson)

One of his papers, "The Ψ-Systems of Freud", was read and discussed at the 1924 meeting of the American Psychoanalytic Association.

== Time in Guam ==
On October 22, 1921, a DC paper reported Thompson had been transferred from Portland to Guam. It would later be reported that on Guam, Thompson had discovered "tombs of Polynesian kings almost as old as that of King Tutenkhaman" on Guam.

== Return from Guam ==
On February 23, Thompson reported to the USS Chaumont for transport to San Francisco. His orders from the trip include the note: "In view of your being a psycho-analyst, and there being a number of psychoneuroses on board, you are hereby ordered to temporary duty while enroute to San Francisco". Thompson and three daughters departed Guam for the US, arriving in San Francisco on March 12. In April 1923, the San Francisco Chronicle reported Thompson had recently arrived from Guam and planned to visit his mother "Mrs. Thomas J. Thompson" in Pasadena.

== Relationship with L. Ron Hubbard ==
In 1923 Thompson accompanied then 12-year-old L. Ron Hubbard, the future founder of Scientology, aboard the USS Ulysses S. Grant. According to a recording of Hubbard sharing anecdotes from his life, he considered Thompson to be a "very great man" who sparked Hubbard's interest in "the human mind". Hubbard said that Thompson told him, "If it's not true for you, it's not true." Hubbard claimed an ongoing relationship with Thompson saying as "the years went along and I knew Thompson again here and there, and I read books that he sent me and so forth."

== D.C. ==
On April 11, 1924, the Washington Psychoanalytic Association held its first meeting. Thompson served as vice-president under William A. White. The inaugural meeting featured a paper titled "An Analysis of a Case of Vampirism" by Dr. Philip S. Graven.

During the summer of 1924, Thompson gave a series of public lectures in Baltimore on Psychoanalysis and diverse topics such as "Polynesian burial sites, evolution of man, origin of writing, primitive art and art of the insane". In one of the lectures, Thompson argued that "Mental diseases are not caused by actual physical injury to the brain [...] are a result of some suppression of thought in the subconscious mind." and that "Epilepsy not due to injured brain cells is caused by the suppression of hate in childhood".

While in D.C., Thompson undertook a course of study at St. Elizabeth's hospital for the insane.

== Baltimore clinic and encounter with Clara Mabel Thompson ==
In January 1925, Thompson opened a clinic at 800 N. Broadway in Baltimore, near The Henry Phipps Psychiatric Clinic. Thompson reached out to that organization's head, Adolf Meyer, requesting Meyer refer patients "who might not be recovered" to him. Meyers declined, also refusing Thompson's request to give a public lecture on Psychoanalysis at the clinic.

Meyers consulted Abraham Brill, who reported that he "considers [Thompson] a crazy person, insane and dangerous". Meyers noted that Thompson affects "a very peculiar cast which leaves no doubt of his eccentricity". Thompson reportedly "wore his uniform constantly as an assertion of authority, with a green scarf fastened by a gold pin in the shape of a snake."

Thompson equated Freud's work to the discoveries of Copernicus and Darwin, and he wrote an article suggesting that psychoanalysis could cure 50 percent of all people ill in hospitals (not just mental patients).

Thompson began treating the noted psychoanalyst Clara Thompson (no relation to Joseph), one of Meyers psychiatric residents. Clara Thompson had been placed in charge of Meyer's private patients. Clara's classmates described her as frequently seen dining with her analyst, or with him "walking arm-in-arm, talking animatedly". By the fall of 1925, Meyer learned Clara had begun treating people at Thompson's clinic, which Meyer described as "Analytic séances with patients in her own room with burning of incense". Meyer dismissed Clara from her position after she refused to discontinue her association with Thompson.

In a later letter to Clara, Dr. Meyer makes a reference to a "misleading influence" that may have been aimed at her analyst. The next year Dr. Meyer wrote to a Johns Hopkins doctor calling Joseph Thompson "a clever, but unsavory psychoanalyst". Clara, meanwhile, felt obliged to defend herself from rumor mongers who claimed that she had been asked to resign for being her analyst's mistress. She wrote to Meyer, "It happens that I have never been his mistress at any time."

== Developer of Burmese cats ==
Already an established breeder of Siamese cats, by 1926 Thompson had founded a cattery which he named "Mau Tien", or cat heaven.

"MAU TIEN CATTERY (Dr. Joseph C. Thompson, San Francisco, California), was established about 1926. The parent stock for this cattery came from their native land and Dr. Thompson made every effort to keep the original characteristics of the native breed. Dr. Thompson's Siamese were very large in size, due in large part to an outdoor mode of life and a diet of lean meat, liver, fish and grass. The imported sire, Tai Mau, weighed seven and one-half pounds while his son, Pak Kwai Mau, tipped the scales at ten and one-half pounds. But the real "jumbo" Siamese of the cattery was Kwai Tse Mau, son of Pak Kwai Mau and Tai Noo Mau, which weighed 15 pounds. In addition to promoting the Siamese, Dr. Thompson was instrumental in creating much interest in the Burmese cat in America. He introduced the Burmese cat to the West by the importation of a female, Wong Mau, from Burma in 1930. Dr. Thompson's established place in the history of the fancy is attributed to his untiring efforts over the years to obtain recognition of the Burmese, with the result that the Burmese cat was accepted and permitted to compete in the championship classes. Dr. Thompson was a former director of the Siamese Cat Society of America."

In order to develop the Burmese breed of cat, "In 1930 Dr. Joseph C. Thompson took a brown cat named Wong Mau from Burma to America. She herself was a hybrid from Siamese and a dark-coated breed named Burmese. Mated to a Siamese, she produced hybrids and Siamese. When the Burmese/Siamese hybrids were mated together, the darker coated Burmese were produced. These bred true, and in 1936 the Burmese was officially recognized in the United States of America as a new show breed." In 1943 the Journal of Heredity published posthumously an article Thompson co-wrote, titled, "The Genetics of the Burmese Cat". At one time Thompson had 45 cats.

In 1933, a Bermese cat named Bacchus, "belonging to Dr. and Mrs. Joseph C. Thompson", was featured at an Oakland cat show.

== Hawaii ==
In 1927, Thompson advertised a public lecture titled "The Psychoanalytic Approach to the Child's Mind" in Hawaii. Thompson served as a senior medical officer at Pearl Harbor and published articles on Psychoanalysis in the local paper.

While in Hawaii, Thompson publicly raised questions in the press about the sanity of Myles Fukunaga, who faced trial for the murder of a ten-year-old. The trial judge dismissed Thompson's opinions, arguing that "The judge of this court, if properly reported by the press, probably would be found insane by this same doctor."

On September 14, 1929, it was reported that Thompson was relieved of duty and ordered home on furlough.

== San Francisco ==
After retiring from the Navy in 1929, Thompson moved to San Francisco, where he was one of very few psychoanalysts. Thompson was a childhood friend of A. L. Kroeber, a local anthropologist who worked as a lay practitioner of psychoanalysis. In San Francisco, Thompson held public lectures, saw patients, trained lay analysts Aaron Morafka, Earl W. Nilsson and Jacques Schnier. Schnier recalled undergoing analysis with Thompson for nine years and having analysis seven days a week for the last five years. Schnier recalled that unlike most psychoanalysts, Thompson employed two couches, one for the client and one for himself; According to Schnier, Thompson would occasionally fall asleep during the sessions.

In 1930, Thompson was one of a group of psychologists who participated in a Berkeley meeting on the prevention of juvenile delinquency. In 1938, a Dr. Joseph C. Thompson summoned police after at attempted suicide by one of Thompson's patients.

After Thompson's death, his students Schnier, Morafka and some of his former patients joined to create the Psychoanalytic Education Society

== Death ==
On March 7, 1943, Thompson died of a heart attack in San Francisco, at the age of 68. His obituary in the San Francisco Chronicle mentioned his widow, Mrs. Hilda Thompson, and a very special Siamese cat, known as Pak Kwai Mau, or 'White Devil Cat'. He left $10,000 in the bank in Pak Kwai Mau's name.

Thompson's grave can be found in Golden Gate National Cemetery, San Bruno, San Mateo County, California.

== Legacy ==
Thompson is commemorated in the scientific name of a species of lizard, Takydromus kuehnei, referring to "Victor Kühne", which was the alias used by Thompson.

== Dates of rank ==
- Assistant Surgeon (with rank of Ensign) – 19 July 1897
- Passed Assistant Surgeon (with rank of Lieutenant Junior Grade) – 19 July 1901
- Surgeon (with rank of Lieutenant Commander) – 3 March 1903
- Medical Inspector (with rank of Commander) – 23 May 1917
- Retired – 15 November 1929
