= Gaizka Bergara =

Spanish footballer

Personal information
- Full name: Gaizka Bergara Picaza
- Date of birth: 7 February 1986 (age 40)
- Place of birth: Bilbao, Spain
- Height: 1.79 m (5 ft 10 1/2 in)
- Position: Defender

Youth career
- 1996–1997: Laudio
- 1997–2004: Athletic Bilbao

Senior career*
Years	Team	Apps	(Gls)
2004–2006	Basconia	48	(0)
2006–2008	Bilbao Athletic	68	(2)
2007	Athletic Bilbao	1	(0)
2008–2010	Sestao	41	(0)
2010–2011	Portugalete	23	(1)
2011–2014	Laudio	96	(11)
2014–2017	Arenas Getxo	100	(17)
- * Club domestic league appearances and goals

Gaizka Bergara Picaza (born 7 February 1986) is a Spanish former professional footballer who played as a defender.

== Football career ==
Bergara was born in Bilbao, Biscay. Having emerged through Athletic Bilbao's prolific youth ranks, Lezama, he made his first-team – and La Liga – debut on 25 February 2007, coming on as a substitute for Josu Sarriegi during a 0–3 away loss against FC Barcelona, but spent the vast majority of his stint at the club with the reserves.

In summer 2008, Bergara was released and joined Basque neighbours Sestao River Club, in the third division. He continued competing in that level in the following years, mainly with CD Laudio and Arenas Club de Getxo.
