= Iker Bachiller =

Spanish footballer

Personal information
- Full name: Iker Bachiller Vega
- Date of birth: 14 September 2002 (age 24)
- Place of birth: Madrid, Spain
- Height: 1.68 m (5 ft 6 in)
- Position: Left back

Team information
- Current team: Tudelano
- Number: 12

Youth career
- 2009–2021: Atlético Madrid

Senior career*
| Years | Team | Apps | (Gls) |
| 2021–2023 | Alcorcón B | 46 | (0) |
| 2021–2023 | Alcorcón | 1 | (0) |
| 2023–2024 | Illescas | 6 | (0) |
| 2024–2025 | Leganés B | 27 | (0) |
| 2024–2025 | Leganés | 0 | (0) |
| 2025– | Tudelano | 20 | (0) |
- * Club domestic league appearances and goals as of 7 May 2026

Iker Bachiller Vega (born 14 September 2002) is a Spanish footballer who plays for Segunda Federación club Tudelano as a left back.

== Club career ==
Born in Madrid, Bachiller joined Atlético Madrid's youth setup in 2009, aged six. In August 2021, after finishing his formation, he moved to AD Alcorcón and was assigned to the reserves in Tercera División RFEF.

Bachiller made his senior debut on 12 September 2021, starting in a 0–3 away loss against CF Fuenlabrada Promesas Madrid 2021. He made his first team debut on 24 October, coming on as a second-half substitute for Juan Aguilera in a 0–3 loss at UD Las Palmas in the Segunda División championship.

Bachiller spent the 2024–25 season with Leganés, mostly with the reserve team in Tercera Federación. He appeared on the bench in 13 La Liga games for the senior Leganés squad, but never appeared on the field in the top tier, making two appearances in the early stages of 2024–25 Copa del Rey.
