= Quique de la Mota =

Spanish footballer

Personal information
- Full name: Enrique González de la Mota Villalba
- Date of birth: 8 July 1984 (age 42)
- Place of birth: Málaga, Spain
- Height: 1.73 m (5 ft 8 in)
- Position: Midfielder

Team information
- Current team: El Palo

Youth career
- Málaga

Senior career*
Years	Team	Apps	(Gls)
2003–2007	Málaga B	35	(0)
2003–2004	→ Linares (loan)	21	(1)
2005–2006	→ Marbella (loan)	19	(1)
2007–2008	Jerez	33	(9)
2008–2010	Lucena	57	(5)
2010–2011	Cultural Leonesa	33	(5)
2011–2012	Jaén	22	(2)
2012–2013	Melilla	26	(1)
2013–2014	Guijuelo	30	(1)
2014–2015	El Palo	32	(2)
2015–2016	Antequera	19	(3)
2016–2019	Zenit Torremolinos	57	(2)
- * Club domestic league appearances and goals as of 04:16, 24 June 2021 (UTC)

Enrique "Quique" González de la Mota Villalba (born 8 July 1984), is a Spanish footballer who played as a central midfielder.

== Club career ==
Born in Málaga, Andalusia, Quique graduated from local Málaga CF's youth system, and made his senior debuts with the reserves in the 2002–03 season, in the Segunda División B. After a loan spell with CD Linares he returned to the B's, and on 29 January 2005 played his first game with the main squad, featuring the last 16 minutes in a 0–3 home loss against Xerez CD in the Segunda División; he spent the 2005–06 campaign with UD Marbella, also on loan.

In 2007 Quique was released by Málaga, and resumed his career in the third level but also in the Tercera División, representing Jerez CF, Lucena CF, Cultural y Deportiva Leonesa, Real Jaén, UD Melilla, CD Guijuelo and CD El Palo.
