= Pau Franch =

Spanish footballer

Personal information
- Full name: Pau Franch Franch
- Date of birth: 25 July 1988 (age 38)
- Place of birth: Betxí, Spain
- Height: 1.85 m (6 ft 1 in)
- Position: Striker

Youth career
- Castellón

Senior career*
Years	Team	Apps	(Gls)
2006–2009	Castellón B	53	(16)
2007–2011	Castellón	44	(5)
2009–2010	→ Alcoyano (loan)	17	(7)
2011–2012	Dénia	32	(9)
2012–2014	Olímpic Xàtiva	66	(11)
2014–2015	La Hoya Lorca	25	(4)
2015–2016	Arandina	33	(11)
2016–2017	Tudelano	13	(2)
2017	Socuéllamos	15	(5)
2017	Saguntino	11	(1)
2018–2019	San Fernando	52	(10)
2019–2020	Alcoyano	21	(12)
2020–2021	Saguntino	21	(5)
- * Club domestic league appearances and goals as of 11:40, 4 January 2022 (UTC)

Pau Franch Franch (born 25 July 1988 in Betxí, Castellón, Valencian Community) is a Spanish professional footballer who plays as a striker.
