= Villarrubia CF =

Spanish association football club

Villarrubia
- Full name: Formac Villarrubia Club de Fútbol
- Founded: 1959
- Ground: Campo Nuevo Municipal, Villarrubia de los Ojos, Castile-La Mancha, Spain
- Capacity: 1,000
- Chairman: (Spain) José Luis Urda
- Manager: (Spain) Javi Sánchez
- League: Tercera Federación – Group 18
- 2025–26: Tercera Federación – Group 18, 6th of 18
- Website: www.vxvillarrubiacf.es
Home colours	Away colours

Villarrubia Club de Fútbol, named Formac Villarrubia Club de Fútbol due to sponsorship reasons, is a football team based in Villarrubia de los Ojos, Castile-La Mancha, Spain. The team plays in Tercera Federación – Group 18. The club's home ground is Campo Nuevo Municipal.

== History ==
Jesús Santos Fiorito founded the club in 1959 and became its first president.

In the 2018-19 season the club finished 2nd in Tercera División, Group 18 and promoted to Segunda División B.

== Season to season ==
Season	Tier	Division	Place	Copa del Rey
1971–72	8	3ª Reg.	11th	
1972–73	8	3ª Reg.	10th	
1973–74	8	3ª Reg.	8th	
1974–75	7	3ª Reg. P.	13th	
1975–76	7	3ª Reg. P.	1st	
1976–77	6	2ª Reg.	17th	
1977–78	7	2ª Reg.	6th	
1978–79	7	2ª Reg.	15th	
1979–80	7	2ª Reg.	12th	
1980–81	7	2ª Reg.	8th	
1981–82	7	2ª Reg.	14th	
1982–83	7	2ª Reg.	8th	
1983–84	7	2ª Reg.	11th	
1984–85	7	2ª Reg.	14th	
1985–86	7	2ª Reg.	12th	
1986–87	6	1ª Reg.	16th	
1987–88	6	1ª Reg.	4th	
1988–89	6	1ª Reg.	1st	
1989–90	5	Reg. Pref.	13th	
1990–91	5	Reg. Pref.	17th	

Season	Tier	Division	Place	Copa del Rey
1991–92	6	1ª Reg.	10th	
1992–93	7	2ª Reg.	8th	
1993–94	7	2ª Reg.	2nd	
1994–95	7	2ª Reg.	1st	
1995–96	6	2ª Aut.	5th	
1996–97	6	2ª Aut.	3rd	
1997–98	6	2ª Aut.	12th	
1998–99	6	2ª Aut.	12th	
1999–2000	6	2ª Aut.	9th	
2000–01	6	2ª Aut.	3rd	
2001–02	6	2ª Aut.	5th	
2002–03	6	2ª Aut.	3rd	
2003–04	6	2ª Aut.	7th	
2004–05	6	2ª Aut.	6th	
2005–06	6	2ª Aut.	1st	
2006–07	5	1ª Aut.	18th	
2007–08	7	2ª Aut.	1st	
2008–09	6	1ª Aut.	2nd	
2009–10	5	Aut. Pref.	2nd	
2010–11	4	3ª	5th	

Season	Tier	Division	Place	Copa del Rey
2011–12	4	3ª	6th	
2012–13	4	3ª	14th	
2013–14	4	3ª	6th	
2014–15	4	3ª	6th	
2015–16	4	3ª	12th	
2016–17	4	3ª	5th	
2017–18	4	3ª	4th	
2018–19	4	3ª	2nd	
2019–20	3	2ª B	12th	First round
2020–21	3	2ª B	8th / 5th	
2021–22	5	3ª RFEF	7th	
2022–23	5	3ª Fed.	5th	
2023–24	5	3ª Fed.	7th	
2024–25	5	3ª Fed.	10th	
2025–26	5	3ª Fed.	6th	
2026–27	5	3ª Fed.		

- 2 seasons in Segunda División B
- 9 seasons in Tercera División
- 6 seasons in Tercera Federación/Tercera División RFEF

== Current squad ==
As of 15 April 2021

Note: Flags indicate national team as defined under FIFA eligibility rules; some limited exceptions apply. Players may hold more than one non-FIFA nationality.

No.	Pos.	Nation	Player
1	GK	ESP	Álvaro Robles
2	DF	ESP	David Herrera
3	DF	ESP	Carlos Martínez
4	DF	ESP	Álex Jiménez
5	DF	ESP	Víctor Algisí
6	MF	ESP	Toni Seoane (captain)
7	FW	ESP	Iván Bueno
8	MF	ESP	José Luis Arroyo
9	FW	ESP	Jesús Berrocal
10	MF	ESP	Javi Grillo
11	FW	ESP	Fran Minaya

No.	Pos.	Nation	Player
13	GK	ESP	Xabi Irureta
14	FW	ESP	Dani Homet
16	MF	ESP	Hakim El Mokh
17	DF	ESP	Dani Cabezuelo
19	MF	ESP	Cristian Beltrán
20	DF	ESP	Iván Gutiérrez
21	FW	ESP	Julen Colinas
22	DF	ESP	Carlos García
