= Antonio Moreno (forward) =

Spanish footballer

Personal information
- Full name: Antonio Moreno Ruiz
- Date of birth: 1 February 1983 (age 43)
- Place of birth: Málaga, Spain
- Height: 1.83 m (6 ft 0 in)
- Position: Forward

Senior career*
Years	Team	Apps	(Gls)
2000–2001	El Palo		
2001–2003	Extremadura B		
2003–2008	Sevilla B	115	(20)
2008–2009	Lorca Deportiva	22	(3)
2009–2010	Marbella	15	(7)
2010–2011	Pontevedra	15	(0)
2011	Cádiz	11	(2)
2011–2012	Puertollano	23	(2)
2012–2013	Barakaldo	5	(0)
2013–2015	El Palo	9	(2)
Total		215	(36)
- * Club domestic league appearances and goals

Antonio Moreno Ruiz (born 1 February 1983) is a Spanish former professional footballer who played as a forward.

== Club career ==
Born in Málaga, Andalusia, Moreno made his senior debut in the 2000–01 season with hometown club CD El Palo. He signed for CF Extremadura in 2001, only appearing for the reserve team over two years.

Moreno joined Sevilla FC's B side in the Segunda División B in summer 2003. On 21 September 2005, he was an unused substitute for the main squad in a 0–0 home draw against Cádiz CF. He finally featured for the latter on 13 November 2007, playing the last three minutes of a 1–1 draw at CD Dénia in the round of 32 of the Copa del Rey.

In June 2008, Moreno was linked with FK Partizan. A month later, however, he joined Lorca Deportiva CF.

Moreno competed in the third tier the following campaigns, representing UD Marbella, Pontevedra CF, Cádiz CF, CD Puertollano, Barakaldo CF and El Palo.

== Personal life ==
Moreno's parents are Spanish and his stepfather is Honduran. His younger half brother, Jonathan Mejía, was also a footballer and a forward who represented Honduras internationally.
