= Philip S. Graven =

American psychoanalyst (1892–1977)

Philip Sigurd Graven (1892–1977) was a medical doctor and pioneering psychoanalyst.

== Childhood and education ==
On 14 May 1892, Graven was born in Eau Claire, Wisconsin to Martin Pederson Graven and Petra Jacobson. When he was four years old, the local paper reported that he had broken his leg falling on a sidewalk, and that he suffered from "an affection of the spine".

In 1914, Graven was student at the University of Chicago.

In 1919, Graven was mentioned in a German-language paper in St. Louis. In 1920, after serving as an intern in a St. Louis Hospital, Graven enrolled in a post-graduate course of study at Yale.

In 1921, Graven was a member of American Medical Association of Vienna. Graven married Rose Velda "R'Velda" Shauta, an Austrian woman.

== Psychoanalytic career ==
In 1924, Graven published a paper on headaches. That same year, Graven authored a paper "The Analytic Treatment of Epilepsy" which was published in the German Journal Fortschritte der Sexualwissenschaft und Psychoanalyse (Advances in Sexology and Psychoanalysis). While at St. Elizabeths, Graven specialized in the psychoanalytic treatment of epilepsy.

In 1924, Graven was a charter member of the Washington DC Psychoanalytic Association, where he presented a paper titled "An Analysis of a Case of Vampirism". In October 1924, Graven was profiled in a Milwaukee paper after national reporting on his career. Graven used his home to host a series of lecture by Hungarian psychoanalyst Sándor Ferenczi. Graven trained Navy medical doctor Joseph Cheesman Thompson in Psychoanalysis.

In 1925, Graven and his wife made a trip from the United States back to Austria to visit her relatives. That year, Graven authored a paper on "A Case of Smoke Phobia". By 1926, it was reported that Graven had become an internationally recognized "authority on shell shock".

While at St. Elizabeth's, Graven collaborated with Alfred Korzybski, proposing the term "Unsane" as a descriptor. In 1926, Graven and Korzybski were summoned by psychiatrist Knute Houck, who they had been "tutoring in psychoanalysis". Houck reported having beaten his wife who was now missing.

In 1930, while at St. Elizabeth's, Graven authored a paper titled "Case Study of a Negro", one of the earliest psychoanalytic discussions of African-Americans.

Graven authored a booklet titled "Social Sanity and the Birth of Words, Part I".

Philip S Graven died in August 1977.
