= Germán Beltrán =

Spanish footballer

Personal information
- Full name: Germán Beltrán Juárez
- Date of birth: 26 October 1979 (age 47)
- Place of birth: Alcañiz, Spain
- Height: 1.72 m (5 ft 7 1/2 in)
- Position: Forward

Team information
- Current team: Alavés C (manager)

Youth career
- Real Madrid

Senior career*
| Years | Team | Apps | (Gls) |
| 1998–1999 | Real Madrid C | | |
| 1999–2001 | Real Madrid B | 32 | (2) |
| 2001–2002 | Reus | 24 | (9) |
| 2002–2004 | Teruel | | |
| 2004–2008 | Barakaldo | 125 | (28) |
| 2008–2010 | Eibar | 37 | (2) |
| 2010 | Girona | 13 | (1) |
| 2010–2011 | Zamora | 24 | (2) |
| 2011–2014 | Laudio | 106 | (35) |
| 2014–2016 | Portugalete | 63 | (11) |
| Total | | 424+ | (90+) |

Managerial career
- 2016–2018: Portugalete (assistant)
- 2018–2020: Barakaldo (assistant)
- 2020–2021: Barakaldo
- 2021–2022: Portugalete
- 2023–2024: Gernika
- 2024–: Alavés C
- * Club domestic league appearances and goals

Germán Beltrán Juárez (born 26 October 1979) is a Spanish former professional footballer who played as a forward. He is currently manager of Tercera Federación club Alavés C.

He spent most of his career in the Segunda División B, making 256 appearances and scoring 49 goals for six clubs, mainly Barakaldo. He played 36 games in the Segunda División for Eibar and Girona, scoring once for each.

== Playing career ==
Born in Alcañiz, Aragon, Beltrán began his career with Real Madrid, playing no higher than the reserves in the Segunda División B. In June 2008, after contributing 15 third-division goals for Barakaldo CF, he signed a two-year contract with Segunda División club SD Eibar with a €1.2 million buyout clause.

In Beltrán's first season with the Basques, they were relegated and he only scored in a 2–3 home loss against Real Zaragoza on 25 April 2009. In February 2010, he moved back up to the second tier with Girona FC until the end of the campaign with the option of one more. Again, he scored just once in his spell in Catalonia, minutes after coming on as a substitute for Jordi Xumetra in his second game, a 3–0 away victory over Rayo Vallecano.

Beltrán was back in division three in August 2010, on a one-year deal at Zamora CF. A year later, he signed for Tercera División club CD Laudio, and scored the only goal on 29 June 2013 as they overcame Mar Menor FC in the playoff final to reach the third division for the only time in their history.

== Coaching career ==
After retiring at Club Portugalete in 2016, Beltrán subsequently worked as assistant manager at that team. In summer 2018, he was appointed at Barakaldo under Aitor Larrazábal in the same capacity.

Beltrán replaced Larrazábal at the helm of Barakaldo on 28 December 2020. However, after only 43 days and three games (two defeats, one draw), he was himself dismissed on 9 February 2021.

Beltrán continued to ply his trade in the lower leagues subsequently, with Portugalete, Gernika Club and Deportivo Alavés C.

== Managerial statistics ==
As of match played 14 November 2026

Managerial record by team and tenure
| Team | Nat | From | To | Record | | | | | | | | Ref |
| Team | Nat | From | To | G | W | D | L | GF | GA | GD | Win % | Ref |
|---|---|---|---|---|---|---|---|---|---|---|---|---|
| Barakaldo | (Spain) | 28 December 2020 | 9 February 2021 | 3 | 0 | 1 | 2 | 2 | 7 | −5 | 0.00 | |
| Portugalete | (Spain) | 7 June 2021 | 18 April 2022 | 36 | 19 | 11 | 6 | 60 | 33 | +27 | 52.78 | |
| Gernika | (Spain) | 6 June 2023 | 16 May 2024 | 35 | 11 | 10 | 14 | 37 | 50 | −13 | 31.43 | |
| Alavés C | (Spain) | 26 November 2024 | Present | 67 | 33 | 15 | 19 | 117 | 75 | +42 | 49.25 | |
| Career Total | | | | 141 | 63 | 37 | 41 | 216 | 165 | +51 | 44.68 | — |
