= Estadio Ciudad de Tudela =

Spanish stadium

Coordinates: 42.0574°N 1.612°W

Ciudad de Tudela
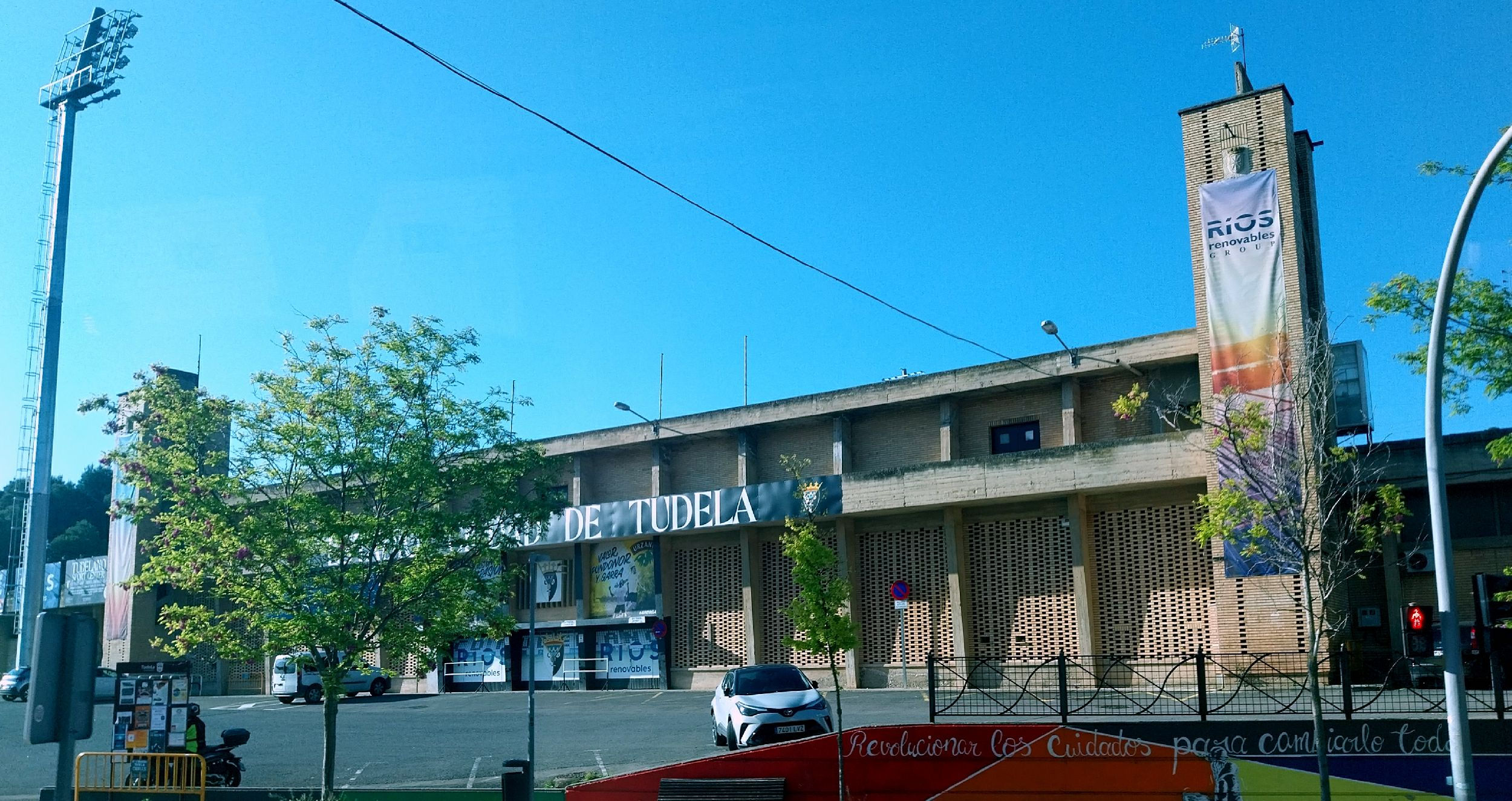
- The stadium in 2025
- Interactive map of Ciudad de Tudela
- Full name: Estadio Ciudad de Tudela
- Former names: José Antonio Elola (1969–2012)
- Location: Tudela, Navarre, Spain
- Capacity: 11,000
- Surface: Grass
- Field size: 100x67m

Construction
- Opened: 1969

Tenant
- CD Tudelano

The Estadio Ciudad de Tudela, formerly Estadio José Antonio Elola, is a multi-use stadium located in Tudela, Navarre, Spain.

It is used for football matches and is the home stadium of CD Tudelano. It has a 11,000-spectator capacity. The stadium was inaugurated on August 17, 1969.
