= CD Tudelano =

Spanish football team

Tudelano
- Full name: Club Deportivo Tudelano
- Nickname: Blancos
- Founded: 1935
- Ground: Ciudad de Tudela, Tudela, Navarre, Spain
- Capacity: 11,000
- President: (Spain) Jesús Miranda
- Head coach: (Spain) Oriol Riera
- League: Segunda Federación – Group 2
- 2025–26: Segunda Federación – Group 2, 5th of 18
Home colours	Away colours

Club Deportivo Tudelano is a Spanish football team based in Tudela, in the autonomous community of Navarre. Founded in 1935 it plays in Segunda Federación – Group 2, holding home matches at Estadio Ciudad de Tudela, with a capacity of 11,000 seats.

== History ==
=== Early history ===
After the Navarre Football Federation was established on 21 May 1928, Tudela lacked a major federated club competing in the region's official leagues. Only school teams from the Jesuit and Marist Brothers’ colleges were affiliated as associate members. In 1935, efforts began to create a club that would represent the city, prompting discussions among several existing local teams.

On 29 November 1935, several local clubs — C.D. Vegetariano, Tudela F.C., Áncora Fordin, Sociedad Gaztesuna, and Muskaria Club — merged to establish Club Deportivo Tudelano. Lucas Gallego was named president, and the newly formed team adopted a white shirt and black shorts as its official kit. The club played its home matches at Campo de Griseras, which had been enclosed since 1934. Tudelano entered competition in the Segunda Regional during the 1935–36 season and secured first place in its debut campaign.

At the same time, C.D. Arenas, which had not joined the merger, continued competing in the Primera Regional as another representative of Tudela. In July 1936, just as CD Tudelano was preparing to compete in the Primera Regional, the outbreak of the Spanish Civil War brought an abrupt suspension of activity that lasted nearly two years. Football resumed in the city in late 1938, once circumstances allowed.

=== 1940s ===
In the 1939–40 season, national and regional football competitions resumed, and CD Tudelano quickly became a prominent club in Navarre. The team finished as runner-up in the Primera Regional in 1940–41 and won the league in both the 1941–42 and 1942–43 seasons. During this period, the renamed C.D. Arenas E.yD. competed in the Segunda Regional.

At the time, the renamed C.D. Arenas E.yD. competed in the Segunda Regional. In 1943, Spain's National Sports Delegation (DND) sought to strengthen football in key population centers by using the newly restructured Tercera División as a platform for smaller clubs. As champions of their region, CD Tudelano earned promotion to the Tercera División and took part in the 1943–44 season in Group III, which included teams from the Basque Country and La Rioja, finishing in sixth place.

In the subsequent seasons, Tudelano placed ninth in 1944–45, eighth in 1945–46, and sixth in 1946–47. In 1947–48, they competed in a group with teams from the Valencia and Castile regions and finished ninth. The 1948–49 campaign saw the club drop to fourteenth and last in a group made up of Basque and Cantabrian clubs. Despite this result, a league restructuring allowed Tudelano to remain in the Tercera División for the 1949–50 season, which they ended in twelfth position.

=== 1950s ===
In the 1950–51 season, CD Tudelano's financial situation had deteriorated significantly, and the team finished in last place (18th), resulting in relegation to the Primera Regional. Over the next two seasons, the club focused on rebuilding both its finances and competitive form, eventually earning promotion back to the Tercera División at the end of the 1952–53 campaign. Tudelano returned to the national league in the 1953–54 season, finishing in a modest fifteenth place.

In 1954–55, a major restructuring of the Tercera División reduced the number of teams per group, and Tudelano was placed in a group alongside clubs from Navarre and Gipuzkoa. The team dominated its group and qualified for the promotion playoffs to the Segunda División, where it finished sixth in a group of eight. Only Ag.D. Plus Ultra earned promotion, with other participants including Ct.D. Manresa, Girona C.F., Arenas S.D., C.D. Elgoibar, C.D. Binéfar, and A.D. Rayo Vallecano.

During the 1955–56 and 1956–57 seasons, Tudelano finished in fourth place, narrowly missing out on promotion, while C.D. Elgoibar claimed the group title both years. The club slipped to sixth in 1957–58 and then to twelfth in 1958–59. A fourteenth-place finish in 1959–60 resulted in relegation to the Primera Regional once again.

=== 1960s ===
The early 1960s proved challenging for CD Tudelano, as several squad lineups failed to secure promotion. It took six seasons before the club, after finishing as runner-up to Club Haro Deportivo in the 1965–66 campaign, achieved promotion back to the Tercera División. From 1966 onward, the club has consistently competed in the national divisions, beginning this long tenure with a tenth-place finish in the 1966–67 season.

In the 1967–68 season, CD Tudelano finished in third place. The following year, the team joined a reorganized Tercera División, competing against clubs from Navarre, Gipuzkoa, La Rioja, and Aragon. The club secured a respectable seventh-place finish in that campaign, a result it repeated in the 1969–70 season. During that period, the team began playing in the new Estadio José Antonio Elola, which was inaugurated on 17 August 1969 in a friendly match against Club Atlético Osasuna that ended in a 1–1 draw.

=== 1970s ===
The club successfully adapted to the structural changes implemented in the Spanish league system during the late 1960s, beginning the 1970s within a reorganized Tercera División, now limited to four high-level groups. In the 1970–71 season, competing in a group alongside teams from Aragon, Castile, the Basque Country, and Navarre, the club struggled to avoid relegation, finishing 16th. This position forced them into a relegation play-off against Balearic side CD Murense, which they won convincingly with a 5–0 home victory and a 3–1 win away in Muro, thus securing their place in the division.

The following season (1971–72) brought little improvement, as they ended in 15th place and again faced a tense relegation play-off, this time against SD Rayo Cantabria. A 4–0 home win and a narrow 3–0 defeat in Santander allowed them to remain in Tercera División on aggregate.

In the subsequent years, the club assembled stronger squads capable of competing more comfortably in the division. They achieved a 7th-place finish in 1972–73, followed by 9th in 1973–74, 8th in 1974–75, and 6th in 1975–76. The 1970s are considered a golden era for the club, with their home ground hosting prominent teams such as Real Valladolid Deportivo, Tenerife Atlético, Palencia CF, Club Atlético Osasuna, UD Salamanca, Getafe Deportivo, CD Logroñés, Castilla CF, Deportivo Alavés, and Club Atlético Madrileño — many of which had experience in higher divisions or featured players who would later gain national recognition.

In the 1976–77 season, the Spanish Football Federation (RFEF) announced the creation of a new intermediate tier between the Segunda División and Tercera División: the Segunda División B. The top ten teams from each of the four Tercera División groups would qualify for the new league. Tudelano responded with a strong campaign, finishing 9th and thus earning a place in the newly formed Segunda División B, ensuring their continued presence at the national third tier.

The club reached Segunda B for the first time in the 1977–78 season, benefiting from a league restructuring that allowed even a ninth-place finish in Tercera División to secure promotion. However, the team struggled to adapt to the higher level of competition and was relegated back to Tercera after just one season.

Back in Tercera División, the team showed a decline in performance, ending the decade with a 6th-place finish in the 1978–79 season and 12th in 1979–80. This period also saw the founding of CD Lourdes in 1979, a new club based in the popular Lourdes neighborhood of Tudela, which would go on to become a notable local football institution.

=== 1980s ===
Throughout the 1980s, CD Tudelano competed continuously in the Tercera División, primarily against clubs from Navarre and La Rioja. While promotion remained the club's objective, achieving it proved difficult. Tudelano finished fourth in 1980–81, fifth in 1981–82, and again fourth in 1982–83. That same season, the club reached the final of the Copa de la Liga for amateur sides but lost to Real Madrid C.F. Aficionados, with a 1–2 home defeat followed by a 1–1 draw in the return leg.

In the 1983–84 season, the club won the league title, suffering only five defeats throughout the campaign. This achievement earned them a place in the promotion playoffs for Segunda División B. However, their promotion hopes were dashed in the semifinals by CA Marbella, who won both legs: 1–0 in Tudela and 2–0 in Marbella. Despite the disappointment, Tudelano claimed the Copa de la Liga title that same season, defeating Yeclano CF in the final — a 1–1 draw in the first leg and a 4–2 victory at home in the return leg.

The following seasons proved challenging. In 1984–85, the club finished 12th, and in 1985–86 narrowly avoided relegation to the Regional Preferente by finishing 18th.

In 1986, RFEF granted the Navarre Football Federation its own group within the Tercera División. Tudelano debuted in this restructured group in the 1986–87 season with a modest 6th-place finish, missing out on promotion. The 1987–88 campaign was even less successful, with the club ending in 13th place. However, results improved significantly in 1988–89, when Tudelano finished 3rd. Building on this progress, the team ended the 1989–90 season as runners-up, just one point behind league champions CD Izarra.

=== 1990s ===
CD Tudelano earned promotion to Segunda División B in the 1990–91 season after winning their Tercera División group. Their time in the third tier lasted five challenging years, with the club consistently struggling to avoid relegation. Ultimately, they were relegated at the end of the 1995–96 campaign. Following this setback, Tudelano experienced a period of decline, missing out on promotion play-offs for ten straight seasons.

During the second half of the decade, the club faced significant financial difficulties, and in the 1996–97 season narrowly avoided further relegation with another 17th-place finish. In the following seasons, however, Tudelano managed to stabilize and consistently finished within the top ten of their Tercera División group.

=== 2000s ===
In the early years of the 21st century, CD Tudelano found itself consistently mid-table, unable to challenge for promotion. The club was regularly outperformed by regional rivals such as Peña Sport F.C. and C.D. Izarra, as well as by other emerging teams. Limited financial resources prevented Tudelano from assembling more competitive squads, and fans grew increasingly concerned about the team's stagnation. A gradual improvement began around the 2005–06 season, when the team finished in seventh place.

The 2006–07 campaign marked the beginning of a determined push for promotion. Finishing fourth in the league, Tudelano reached the promotion play-offs but was eliminated by Las Palmas Atlético after a 2–2 home draw and a 1–0 away defeat. They repeated a fourth-place finish in 2007–08 and overcame C.D. Alfaro in the first round (4–0 at home, 3–1 away), but were denied promotion by Real Murcia Imperial, losing both legs of the final.

Undeterred, the club continued its efforts. In 2008–09, Tudelano placed third but fell to C.D. Ourense SAD in the opening round of the play-offs, suffering a heavy 4–0 away loss before winning 2–1 at home. The following season, 2009–10, saw Tudelano crowned league champions. However, they missed out on direct promotion after losing to Atlético Baleares (1–0 away, 2–1 at home). In the subsequent semi-final, they convincingly beat C.D. Llanes (2–2 away, 6–0 at home), but narrowly lost the final to F.C. Santboià, falling 2–1 in both legs and then 4–3 on penalties.

=== 2010s ===
In the 2010–11 campaign, the club secured another league title and entered the promotion playoffs for the fifth consecutive year. In the Champions Stage, they were eliminated by Real Balompédica Linense, losing 1–0 at home and 4–0 away. Advancing to the semifinals as in the previous season, they defeated CD Pozoblanco with a goalless draw away and a 2–0 win at home. However, they fell in the final to UD San Sebastián de los Reyes, suffering a 2–1 loss away and a 1–0 defeat on home ground.

Promotion to Segunda División B was finally achieved in the 2011–12 season. After finishing third in the regular league, the club advanced through the playoff rounds by overcoming CD Azuqueca (1–1 away, 2–1 at home), CP Villarrobledo (2–1 at home, 2–2 away), and Catarroja CF (4–0 at home, 1–0 away) in the final. On 2 March 2012, the club's stadium was officially renamed Ciudad de Tudela following a resolution by the local city council.

In 2016, CD Tudelano qualified to the promotion playoffs to Segunda División for the first time in its history.

== Season to season ==
Season	Tier	Division	Place	Copa del Rey
1939–40	4	1ª Reg.	3rd	
1940–41	4	1ª Reg.	2nd	
1941–42	4	1ª Reg.	1st	
1942–43	4	1ª Reg.	1st	
1943–44	3	3ª	6th	
1944–45	3	3ª	9th	
1945–46	3	3ª	8th	
1946–47	3	3ª	8th	
1947–48	3	3ª	9th	
1948–49	3	3ª	14th	
1949–50	3	3ª	12th	
1950–51	3	3ª	18th	
1951–52	4	1ª Reg.	3rd	
1952–53	4	1ª Reg.	1st	
1953–54	3	3ª	15th	
1954–55	3	3ª	1st	
1955–56	3	3ª	4th	
1956–57	3	3ª	4th	
1957–58	3	3ª	6th	
1958–59	3	3ª	12th	

Season	Tier	Division	Place	Copa del Rey
1959–60	3	3ª	14th	
1960–61	4	1ª Reg.	3rd	
1961–62	4	1ª Reg.	3rd	
1962–63	4	1ª Reg.	2nd	
1963–64	4	1ª Reg.	1st	
1964–65	4	1ª Reg.	3rd	
1965–66	4	1ª Reg.	4th	
1966–67	3	3ª	10th	
1967–68	3	3ª	3rd	
1968–69	3	3ª	7th	
1969–70	3	3ª	7th	Second round
1970–71	3	3ª	16th	First round
1971–72	3	3ª	15th	Second round
1972–73	3	3ª	7th	First round
1973–74	3	3ª	9th	Second round
1974–75	3	3ª	8th	Second round
1975–76	3	3ª	6th	Third round
1976–77	3	3ª	9th	Second round
1977–78	3	2ª B	19th	Second round
1978–79	4	3ª	6th	First round

Season	Tier	Division	Place	Copa del Rey
1979–80	4	3ª	12th	First round
1980–81	4	3ª	4th	Third round
1981–82	4	3ª	5th	First round
1982–83	4	3ª	4th	First round
1983–84	4	3ª	1st	First round
1984–85	4	3ª	12th	First round
1985–86	4	3ª	18th	
1986–87	4	3ª	6th	
1987–88	4	3ª	13th	First round
1988–89	4	3ª	3rd	
1989–90	4	3ª	2nd	
1990–91	4	3ª	1st	First round
1991–92	3	2ª B	15th	First round
1992–93	3	2ª B	16th	Third round
1993–94	3	2ª B	13th	First round
1994–95	3	2ª B	15th	
1995–96	3	2ª B	17th	
1996–97	4	3ª	17th	
1997–98	4	3ª	6th	
1998–99	4	3ª	5th	

Season	Tier	Division	Place	Copa del Rey
1999–2000	4	3ª	8th	
2000–01	4	3ª	9th	
2001–02	4	3ª	11th	
2002–03	4	3ª	8th	
2003–04	4	3ª	6th	
2004–05	4	3ª	13th	
2005–06	4	3ª	7th	
2006–07	4	3ª	4th	
2007–08	4	3ª	4th	
2008–09	4	3ª	3rd	
2009–10	4	3ª	1st	
2010–11	4	3ª	1st	Second round
2011–12	4	3ª	3rd	First round
2012–13	3	2ª B	7th	
2013–14	3	2ª B	13th	Third round
2014–15	3	2ª B	5th	
2015–16	3	2ª B	3rd	Second round
2016–17	3	2ª B	9th	Third round
2017–18	3	2ª B	9th	Third round
2018–19	3	2ª B	14th	Second round

Season	Tier	Division	Place	Copa del Rey
2019–20	3	2ª B	20th	First round
2020–21	3	2ª B	1st / 5th	
2021–22	3	1ª RFEF	19th	First round
2022–23	4	2ª Fed.	6th	
2023–24	4	2ª Fed.	7th	Second round
2024–25	4	2ª Fed.	11th	First round
2025–26	4	2ª Fed.	5th	
2026–27	4	2ª Fed.		First round

- 1 season in Primera División RFEF
- 15 seasons in Segunda División B
- 5 seasons in Segunda Federación
- 55 seasons in Tercera División

== Current squad ==
As of 24 July 2026

Note: Flags indicate national team as defined under FIFA eligibility rules; some limited exceptions apply. Players may hold more than one non-FIFA nationality.

No.	Pos.	Nation	Player
1	GK	ESP	Aitor Ekiza
2	DF	ESP	Ander Dufur
3	DF	ESP	Victor Rodriguez
4	DF	ESP	Asier Pérez
5	DF	DOM	Carlos Julio Martínez
6	MF	ESP	Guillermo Alonso
7	FW	ESP	Colau
8	MF	ESP	Manu Vila (on loan from Castellón B)
9	FW	ESP	Guillem Naranjo
10	FW	ESP	David Aparicio
12	DF	ESP	Iker Bachiller

No.	Pos.	Nation	Player
13	GK	ESP	Yoel Ramírez
14	MF	ESP	Daniel Santigosa
15	DF	ESP	Adri Miranda
16	DF	ESP	Alejandro Parada
17	FW	ESP	Iñigo Alayeto
18	MF	ESP	Javier Albín
19	DF	ESP	Julen Monreal
20	MF	ESP	Curro Bonilla
21	FW	ESP	Asier Teijeira
22	MF	ESP	David Arredondo (on loan from Basconia)
23	FW	ALG	Tazghat Bouguettaya
31	GK	ESP	Joel Jarauta

=== Out on loan ===
Note: Flags indicate national team as defined under FIFA eligibility rules; some limited exceptions apply. Players may hold more than one non-FIFA nationality.

No.	Pos.	Nation	Player

== Famous players ==
- (Equatorial Guinea) Jannick Buyla
- (Equatorial Guinea) Gorka Luariz
- (Morocco) Oussama Souaidy
- (Spain) Eleuterio Santos
- (Spain) Enrique Martín
