= Mariano Sanz =

Spanish footballer

Personal information
- Full name: Mariano Sanz Novillo
- Date of birth: 11 November 1989 (age 37)
- Place of birth: Benidorm, Spain
- Height: 1.83 m (6 ft 0 in)
- Position: Forward

Youth career
- Benidorm

Senior career*
| Years | Team | Apps | (Gls) |
| 2007–2010 | Benidorm | 34 | (7) |
| 2007–2008 | → Campello (loan) | 29 | (15) |
| 2010–2012 | Osasuna B | 69 | (8) |
| 2012–2013 | Racing B | 33 | (9) |
| 2012–2015 | Racing Santander | 55 | (9) |
| 2015–2016 | Hércules | 22 | (3) |
| 2016–2018 | Alcoyano | 50 | (7) |
| 2018–2020 | La Nucía | 26 | (8) |
| 2021–2024 | La Nucía | 102 | (13) |
| 2024–2025 | Benidorm | 14 | (0) |
- * Club domestic league appearances and goals as of 17:38, 5 October 2026 (UTC)

Mariano Sanz Novillo (born 11 November 1989) is a Spanish professional footballer who plays as a forward.

== Club career ==
Born in Benidorm, Province of Alicante, Valencian Community, Sanz was a youth product of local club Benidorm CF, making his senior debut in the 2006–07 season in the Segunda División B. In July 2010 he signed with CA Osasuna, being assigned to the reserves in the same level.

On 17 July 2012, Sanz joined another reserve team, Racing de Santander B still in the third division. In July 2013 he was promoted to the main squad, recently relegated to that league, and appeared in 33 matches in all competitions during the campaign and scored four goals (the most notable in a 2–0 win over La Liga club UD Almería in the Copa del Rey on 14 January 2014), as the Cantabrians returned to Segunda División at the first attempt.

Sanz played his first match as a professional on 30 August 2014, coming on as a substitute for Borja Granero in the 55th minute of the home fixture against CD Mirandés and netting six minutes later, but in an eventual 1–2 loss. The following 17 January he scored his third goal in the second tier, being also sent off late into the 1–0 defeat of Albacete Balompié also at the Campos de Sport de El Sardinero; the season ended in immediate relegation.

Sanz competed in the lower leagues until his retirement, with Hércules CF, CD Alcoyano and CF La Nucía. He helped the latter side to reach division three for the first time ever in 2018–19, but was later sidelined for more than one year with a serious knee injury.
