= Cala (footballer, born 1990) =

Spanish footballer

Personal information
- Full name: Sergio Calatayud Lebrón
- Date of birth: 2 March 1990 (age 36)
- Place of birth: Antequera, Spain
- Height: 1.72 m (5 ft 8 in)
- Position: Midfielder

Youth career
- 2008–2009: Málaga

Senior career*
Years	Team	Apps	(Gls)
2009–2014	Málaga B	116	(8)
2011	Málaga	1	(0)
2013–2014	→ Fuenlabrada (loan)	22	(0)
2014–2015	El Palo	23	(0)
2015–2016	Jaén	33	(1)
2016–2017	Jönköpings Södra	10	(1)
2017–2019	Antequera	72	(2)
2019–2020	Ibiza Islas Pitiusas	19	(2)
2020–2022	El Palo	28	(2)
2022–2024	Torre del Mar	50	(4)
2024–2025	El Palo	21	(0)
- * Club domestic league appearances and goals as of 00:22, 26 August 2025 (UTC)

Sergio Calatayud Lebrón (born 2 March 1990), known as Cala, is a Spanish footballer who plays as a midfielder.

== Club career ==
Cala was born in Antequera, Province of Málaga. Raised in local Málaga CF's youth ranks, he made his senior debut with the reserves in the Tercera División. He played his first competitive match with the first team on 3 March 2011, coming on as a substitute for Quincy Owusu-Abeyie in the 69th minute of a 7–0 La Liga away loss against Real Madrid.

After leaving the La Rosaleda Stadium, Cala represented in quick succession CF Fuenlabrada, CD El Palo and Real Jaén, with all the clubs competing in the Segunda División B. He moved abroad for the first time on 22 July 2016, signing with Allsvenskan side Jönköpings Södra IF for the remainder of the season and leaving in early June 2017.
