= Consuelo Seoane =

American military officer (1876–1964)

Consuelo Andrew Seoane (1876–1964) was a colonel in the United States Army (3rd Cavalry) who was one of the first two American spies for the U.S. Army known to have operated in Japan, Korea, Ryukyu, Taiwan, Manchuria and China.

In company with United States Navy Commander Joseph Cheesman Thompson, Col. Seoane traveled under assumed names and South African nationality, posing as a naturalist, while mapping invasion routes, and counting naval guns and fortifications in Empire of Japan during 1909–1911.

Col. Seoane's autobiography has been described as “exploits of a U.S. Army officer in the Spanish–American War, the Philippine Insurrection, a spy in Japan, and two World Wars.” His widow Rhoda wrote book about him titled Uttermost East and the Longest War.

The Ibizan Hound dog breed was first imported into the United States by Col. Seoane and his wife in 1956.

Sociologist William Sims Bainbridge is Consuelo's grand-nephew.

== Published works ==
- Beyond the Ranges (autobiography with Robert L. Niemann and Brigadier General Henry J. Reilly) published 5/2/1960 by Robert Spellar and Sons, NY ISBN 0-8315-0069-7
- 'Signal Corps lays the Alaskan Cable' (1925), The Military Engineer
- 'A Military and Political Report on the Far East' (1911) Washington
- 'Syllabus of Davis' International Law' (1904) (with George B. Davis) published Kansas City, MO, by Hudson Kimberly Publishing Co.
