= Antonio Megías =

Spanish footballer

Antono Megías
Personal information
- Full name: Antonio Megías Gaspar
- Date of birth: 3 July 1984 (age 42)
- Place of birth: Murcia, Spain
- Height: 1.86 m (6 ft 1 in)
- Position: Striker

Youth career
- Atlético Madrid

Senior career*
Years	Team	Apps	(Gls)
2003–2005	Murcia B		
2005	Alcalá	8	(1)
2006–2007	Arenas	24	(15)
2007–2008	Roquetas	31	(15)
2008–2009	Motril	36	(21)
2009	Puerto Real	2	(0)
2009	La Nucía	12	(2)
2010	Košice	11	(1)
2010–2013	La Roda	97	(33)
2013–2014	Cartagena	37	(6)
2014–2015	Toledo	32	(3)
2015–2017	La Roda	75	(28)
2017–2021	Socuéllamos	92	(41)
2021–2023	Quintanar del Rey	64	(31)
2023–2024	Socuéllamos	31	(4)
- * Club domestic league appearances and goals

Antonio Megías Gaspar (born 3 July 1984) is a Spanish former footballer who played as a striker.

== Club career ==
Born in Murcia, Megías finished his development at Atlético Madrid. From there onwards he played exclusively in the lower leagues of his country, never competing in higher than Segunda División B; his first spell in that level was the first part of 2005–06 with Alcalá, with the campaign ending in relegation after the player had already left for Arenas.

On 14 January 2010, Megías signed a contract with Slovak club MFK Košice, in what was his first top level experience. He returned to his country in the summer, however, joining La Roda in Tercera División and scoring nine goals in his first season as the team promoted to the third level for the first time ever.

Megías improved his league tally to ten in 2011–12, helping La Roda retain its league status after finishing ninth. He subsequently resumed his career in division three, representing Cartagena Toledo but also Socuéllamos in Tercera División.
