= Lucas Viale =

Argentinian footballer (born 1985)

Personal information
- Full name: Lucas Agustín Viale Ochoa
- Date of birth: 9 March 1985 (age 41)
- Place of birth: Córdoba, Argentina
- Height: 1.82 m (6 ft 0 in)
- Position: Central defender

Team information
- Current team: Sabadell (sporting director)

Youth career
- Damm
- Mallorca

Senior career*
Years	Team	Apps	(Gls)
2004–2006	Mataró	40	(1)
2006–2007	Sant Andreu	26	(1)
2007–2008	Osasuna Promesas	23	(1)
2008–2009	Atlético Baleares	26	(1)
2009–2012	L'Hospitalet	100	(5)
2012–2014	Gimnàstic de Tarragona	30	(1)
2014–2014	L'Hospitalet	20	(0)
2014–2015	Sant Andreu	22	(0)
2015–2017	Sabadell	45	(1)
2017–2022	Llagostera	85	(8)
Total		417	(19)
- * Club domestic league appearances and goals

Lucas Agustín Viale Ochoa (born 9 March 1985) is an Argentinian former professional footballer who played as a central defender. He is the current sporting director of LaLiga Hypermotion club CE Sabadell.

== Playing career ==
Born in Córdoba, Argentina, he moved with his family to Catalonia at a young age. He played youth football at CF Damm and RCD Mallorca before making his senior debut with CE Mataró. He also played for UE Sant Andreu, Osasuna Promesas, Atlético Baleares, CE L'Hospitalet, Gimnàstic de Tarragona, CE Sabadell and UE Llagostera, mainly in the third tier.

== Post-retirement ==
In January 2022 and following an injury, he retired from playing and was named new sporting director of his last club, which at that time was called UE Costa Brava. He remained there until the end of the 2023-24 season, when the team, now called Badalona Futur, missed promotion in the play-offs after slipping down after the departure of manager Ferran Costa to FC Andorra on 31 March 2024.

He was named sporting director of CE Sabadell on 30 May 2024 after the relegation of the club to the fourth tier. After achieving back-to-back promotions from Segunda Federación to LaLiga2, his contract was extended until June 2028.
