= El Palo FC =

Association football club in Spain

El Palo
- Full name: El Palo Fútbol Club
- Founded: 1971; 55 years ago
- Ground: San Ignacio, Málaga, Andalusia, Spain
- Capacity: 2,000
- Chairman: (Spain) Juan Romero
- Manager: (Spain) Jesús Moro
- League: Tercera Federación – Group 9
- 2024–25: Tercera Federación – Group 9, 11th of 18
Home colours	Away colours

El Palo Fútbol Club is a Spanish football team based in Málaga, in the autonomous community of Andalusia. Founded in 1971, it currently plays in Tercera Federación – Group 9, holding home matches at Estadio San Ignacio, which has a 2,000-seat capacity.

== History ==
Logo of the club from 1972 to 2019.

The club was founded in 1971 as Centro de Deportes El Palo. On 20 October 2017 Juan Francisco Funes became the new head coach of the club. On 3 July 2019, the club changed its name to El Palo Fútbol Club.

== Season to season ==
Season	Tier	Division	Place	Copa del Rey
1971–72	4	Reg. Pref.	5th	
1972–73	4	Reg. Pref.	13th	
1973–74	4	Reg. Pref.	10th	
1974–75	4	Reg. Pref.	19th	
1975–76	5	1ª Reg.	11th	
1976–77	5	1ª Reg.	14th	
1977–78	6	1ª Reg.	5th	
1978–79	6	1ª Reg.	12th	
1979–80	6	1ª Reg.	7th	
1980–81	6	1ª Reg.	9th	
1981–82	5	Reg. Pref.	2nd	
1982–83	4	3ª	19th	
1983–84	5	Reg. Pref.	4th	
1984–85	5	Reg. Pref.	7th	
1985–86	5	Reg. Pref.	6th	
1986–87	5	Reg. Pref.	10th	
1987–88	5	Reg. Pref.	1st	
1988–89	4	3ª	12th	
1989–90	4	3ª	20th	
1990–91	5	Reg. Pref.	14th	

Season	Tier	Division	Place	Copa del Rey
1991–92	5	Reg. Pref.	4th	
1992–93	5	Reg. Pref.	9th	
1993–94	5	Reg. Pref.	9th	
1994–95	5	Reg. Pref.	6th	
1995–96	5	Reg. Pref.	4th	
1996–97	5	Reg. Pref.	3rd	
1997–98	5	Reg. Pref.	5th	
1998–99	5	Reg. Pref.	5th	
1999–2000	5	Reg. Pref.	10th	
2000–01	5	Reg. Pref.	11th	
2001–02	5	Reg. Pref.	16th	
2002–03	5	Reg. Pref.	16th	
2003–04	6	Reg. Pref.	2nd	
2004–05	6	Reg. Pref.	10th	
2005–06	6	Reg. Pref.	5th	
2006–07	6	Reg. Pref.	4th	
2007–08	6	Reg. Pref.	1st	
2008–09	5	1ª And.	2nd	
2009–10	4	3ª	3rd	
2010–11	4	3ª	13th	

Season	Tier	Division	Place	Copa del Rey
2011–12	4	3ª	9th	
2012–13	4	3ª	1st	
2013–14	3	2ª B	12th	First round
2014–15	3	2ª B	19th	
2015–16	4	3ª	5th	
2016–17	4	3ª	8th	
2017–18	4	3ª	10th	
2018–19	4	3ª	4th	
2019–20	4	3ª	8th	
2020–21	4	3ª	3rd / 6th	
2021–22	5	3ª RFEF	10th	
2022–23	5	3ª Fed.	3rd	
2023–24	4	2ª Fed.	15th	
2024–25	5	3ª Fed.	11th	
2025–26	5	3ª Fed.		

- 2 seasons in Segunda División B
- 1 season in Segunda Federación
- 13 seasons in Tercera División
- 4 seasons in Tercera Federación/Tercera División RFEF

== Current squad ==
Note: Flags indicate national team as defined under FIFA eligibility rules; some limited exceptions apply. Players may hold more than one non-FIFA nationality.

No.	Pos.	Nation	Player
—	GK	ESP	Pol Ballesté
—	GK	ESP	Adri Jiménez
—	DF	ESP	Manolo Gaspar
—	DF	ESP	Jesule
—	DF	ESP	Nacho Aranda
—	DF	ESP	Igna
—	MF	ESP	Rafita Villén
—	MF	ESP	Antonio Muñoz
—	MF	ESP	Javi Amaya
—	MF	ESP	Quique
—	MF	ESP	José Marín

No.	Pos.	Nation	Player
—	MF	ESP	Jorge Durán
—	MF	ESP	Cala
—	MF	ARG	Damián Zamorano
—	MF	ESP	Juanillo
—	MF	ESP	Apoño
—	FW	ESP	Antonio Moreno
—	FW	ESP	Pirulo
—	FW	ESP	Salvi
—	FW	ARG	Julián Cardellino
—	FW	ESP	Falu Aranda
—	FW	ARG	Pibe

== Former players ==
- (Spain) Jaume Doménech
- (Philippines) Ángel Guirado
