= Toni Seoane =

Spanish footballer

Personal information
- Full name: Antonio Jesús Seoane Ochoa
- Date of birth: 30 May 1989 (age 37)
- Place of birth: Córdoba, Spain
- Height: 1.78 m (5 ft 10 in)
- Position: Midfielder

Team information
- Current team: Villarrubia
- Number: 6

Youth career
- Levante

Senior career*
Years	Team	Apps	(Gls)
2008–2009	Zaragoza B	1	(0)
2009–2010	Córdoba B	43	(3)
2010	Córdoba	1	(0)
2010–2012	Lucena	20	(0)
2012–2013	Córdoba B	44	(6)
2013–2014	Xerez	18	(1)
2014–2015	Arandina	25	(4)
2015–2016	Amorebieta	16	(1)
2016	Arandina	13	(0)
2016–2017	Novelda	29	(3)
2017–	Villarrubia	118	(11)
- * Club domestic league appearances and goals as of 10 April 2021

Antonio 'Toni' Jesús Seoane Ochoa (born 30 May 1989) is a Spanish footballer who plays for Villarrubia CF as a midfielder.

== Club career ==
Born in Córdoba, Andalusia, Seoane made his senior debuts with Real Zaragoza B in the 2008–09 season, in the Tercera División. In January 2009 he joined Córdoba CF, being assigned to the reserves also in the fourth division. On 16 June 2010 he made his professional debut with the latter's main squad, playing the last minutes of the 1–0 away win against CD Castellón in the Segunda División.

In July 2010 Seoane signed with neighbouring Lucena CF of the Segunda División B. However, in January 2012, he returned to Córdoba B after being sparingly used.

On 15 August 2013 Seoane signed with another club in his native region, Xerez CD of the Tercera División.
