= Fran Pineda =

Spanish footballer

Personal information
- Full name: Francisco Alejandro Pineda Macías
- Date of birth: 23 March 1988 (age 38)
- Place of birth: Málaga, Spain
- Height: 1.82 m (6 ft 0 in)
- Position: Forward

Youth career
- Málaga
- Zaragoza

Senior career*
Years	Team	Apps	(Gls)
2008–2009	Alhaurín de la Torre	8	(4)
2009	Alcobendas	5	(0)
2009–2010	Atlético Benamiel	1	(0)
2010–2011	Rincón	20	(17)
2011–2012	Altea	4	(0)
2012	Milsami	5	(0)
2012	Alhaurín de la Torre	5	(2)
2012–2013	Atlético Ceuta	10	(5)
2013	UCAM Murcia	14	(5)
2013	Xerez	6	(2)
2014	Moghreb Tétouan		
2014–2015	Badalona	6	(0)
2015	Formentera	14	(1)
2015–2016	Antequera	16	(1)
2016–2017	Zenit Torremolinos	29	(5)
Total		143	(42)
- * Club domestic league appearances and goals

Francisco 'Fran' Alejandro Pineda Macías (born 23 March 1988) is a Spanish former footballer who played as a forward.

== Club career ==
Born in Málaga, Andalusia, Pineda made his senior debuts for local Alhaurín de la Torre CF in the 2008–09 campaign, in the regional leagues. In January 2009, he moved to fellow league team Alcobendas CF, and continued to appear in the lower leagues in the following years, representing Atlético Benamiel CF, CD Rincón and UD Altea.

On March 1, 2012, Pineda moved abroad for the first time in his career, joining Moldovan National Division side FC Milsami Orhei. He made his debut as a professional two days later, starting in a 1–0 away win against FC Iskra-Stal.

In the 2012 summer, Pineda returned to his former club Alhaurín de la Torre in Tercera División, but moved to fellow league team CA Ceuta in November. On January 31, he signed for Segunda División B side UCAM Murcia CF, and scored five goals during the season, which ended in relegation.

On August 21, 2013, Pineda joined Xerez CD, freshly relegated to the fourth level. He rescinded with the club in October, and signed a three-and-a-half-year deal with Moghreb Tétouan on January 13, 2014.

On July 15, 2014, Pineda was released by Moghreb, and moved to CF Badalona on August 28. After featuring rarely, he rescinded his link and joined fourth-tier SD Formentera on January 16 of the following year.
