= CD Laudio =

Spanish football team

Laudio
- logo
- Full name: Club Deportivo Laudio Fútbol San Rokezar
- Founded: 16 July 1927; 99 years ago
- Ground: Ellakuri, Laudio/Llodio, Basque Country, Spain
- Capacity: 3,500
- Chairman: Santos Arrazuria
- Manager: Ramón Castelo
- League: División de Honor
- 2025–26: División de Honor, 5th of 16
Home colours	Away colours

Club Deportivo Laudio de Fútbol San Rokezar is a Spanish football team based in Laudio/Llodio, in the autonomous community of Basque Country. Founded in 1927 it plays in División de Honor, holding home matches at Estadio Ellakuri, which has a capacity of 3.500 spectators.

== History ==
Founded in 1927 as SD Llodiana or SD Llodio, the club started playing in 1934 before changing name to CD Villosa in 1940. The club joined the Biscay Federation in 1945, and first reached Tercera División in 1954.

In 1972, Villosa switched name back to SD Llodio, but suffered relegation from the third division in the following year. In 2002, after only a further appearance in Tercera (now the fourth tier), the club was renamed CD Llodio Salleko. A year later, they managed to achieve promotion to division four.

In 2006, Llodio Salleko was renamed CD Laudio Fútbol San Rokezar. In 2012 the club won its group, but lost 3–0 on aggregate in the playoff final to San Fernando CD. In winning that group, the club qualified for the first time to the Copa del Rey, where they lost in the first round at home by a single goal to neighbours SD Eibar.

Again the group winners, Laudio made the playoffs in 2013 and defeated Mar Menor FC in the final via a goal from Germán Beltrán. In the subsequent cup run, they dispatched Real Unión and Écija Balompié before a penalty shootout elimination in the third round at home to CD Olímpic de Xàtiva.

Laudio's only season in Segunda División B in 2013–14 ended with relegation in 17th place. However, the club was given a further demotion back to the regional leagues due to wage backlogs of €200,000 to its players.

=== Club background ===
- Sociedad Deportiva Llodio (1927–1940; 1972–2002)
- Club Deportivo Villosa (1940–1972)
- Club Deportivo Llodio Salleko (2002–2006)
- Club Deportivo Laudio Fútbol San Rokezar (2006–present)

== Season to season ==
Season	Tier	Division	Place	Copa del Rey
1945–46	5	2ª Reg.	3rd	
1946–47	5	2ª Reg.	1st	
1947–48	5	2ª Reg.	1st	
1948–49	4	1ª Reg.	6th	
1949–50	4	1ª Reg.	5th	
1950–51	4	1ª Reg.	6th	
1951–52	4	1ª Reg.	6th	
1952–53	4	1ª Reg.	2nd	
1953–54	4	1ª Reg.	1st	
1954–55	3	3ª	6th	
1955–56	3	3ª	11th	
1956–57	3	3ª	3rd	
1957–58	3	3ª	14th	
1958–59	4	1ª Reg.	12th	
1959–60	4	1ª Reg.	12th	
1960–61	4	1ª Reg.	14th	
1961–62	4	1ª Reg.	11th	
1962–63	4	1ª Reg.	10th	
1963–64	4	1ª Reg.	1st	
1964–65	3	3ª	16th	

Season	Tier	Division	Place	Copa del Rey
1965–66	4	1ª Reg.	2nd	
1966–67	3	3ª	4th	
1967–68	3	3ª	4th	
1968–69	3	3ª	9th	
1969–70	3	3ª	13th	
1970–71	4	Reg. Pref.	1st	
1971–72	3	3ª	7th	
1972–73	3	3ª	20th	First round
1973–74	4	Reg. Pref.	14th	
1974–75	4	Reg. Pref.	20th	
1975–76	5	1ª Reg.	3rd	
1976–77	4	Reg. Pref.	16th	
1977–78	5	Reg. Pref.	8th	
1978–79	5	Reg. Pref.	19th	
1979–80	6	1ª Reg.	10th	
1980–81	6	1ª Reg.	3rd	
1981–82	5	Reg. Pref.	11th	
1982–83	5	Reg. Pref.	19th	
1983–84	6	1ª Reg.	2nd	
1984–85	5	Reg. Pref.	8th	

Season	Tier	Division	Place	Copa del Rey
1985–86	5	Reg. Pref.	3rd	
1986–87	5	Reg. Pref.	11th	
1987–88	5	Reg. Pref.	20th	
1988–89	6	1ª Reg.	7th	
1989–90	6	1ª Reg.	13th	
1990–91	6	1ª Terr.	13th	
1991–92	6	1ª Terr.	5th	
1992–93	6	1ª Terr.	1st	
1993–94	5	Terr. Pref.	15th	
1994–95	5	Terr. Pref.	20th	
1995–96	5	Reg. Pref.	1st	
1996–97	4	3ª	20th	
1997–98	5	Reg. Pref.	4th	
1998–99	5	Reg. Pref.	3rd	
1999–2000	5	Reg. Pref.	5th	
2000–01	5	Reg. Pref.	6th	
2001–02	5	Reg. Pref.	6th	
2002–03	5	Reg. Pref.	1st	
2003–04	4	3ª	17th	
2004–05	4	3ª	15th	

Season	Tier	Division	Place	Copa del Rey
2005–06	4	3ª	6th	
2006–07	4	3ª	13th	
2007–08	4	3ª	15th	
2008–09	4	3ª	8th	
2009–10	4	3ª	11th	
2010–11	4	3ª	2nd	
2011–12	4	3ª	1st	
2012–13	4	3ª	1st	First round
2013–14	3	2ª B	17th	Third round
2014–15	5	Reg. Pref.	7th	
2015–16	5	Reg. Pref.	6th	
2016–17	5	Reg. Pref.	9th	
2017–18	5	Reg. Pref.	14th	
2018–19	5	Reg. Pref.	7th	
2019–20	5	Reg. Pref.	5th	
2020–21	5	Reg. Pref.	2nd	
2021–22	6	Reg. Pref.	2nd	
2022–23	6	Div. Hon.	3rd	
2023–24	6	Div. Hon.	6th	
2024–25	6	Div. Hon.	5th	

Season	Tier	Division	Place	Copa del Rey
2025–26	6	Div. Hon.	5th	
2026–27	6	Div. Hon.		

- 1 season in Segunda División B
- 22 seasons in Tercera División
