= Miguel Marín =

Miguel Marín may refer to:

- Miguel Marín (Argentine footballer) (1945–1991), Argentine football goalkeeper
- Miguel Marín (Mexican footballer) (born 1989), Mexican football goalkeeper
- Miguel Marín (Spanish footballer) (born 1990), Spanish football left-back
