= Iván Aguilar =

Spanish footballer

Personal information
- Full name: Iván Aguilar Díaz
- Date of birth: 12 June 1991 (age 35)
- Place of birth: Benalmádena, Spain
- Height: 1.79 m (5 ft 10 in)
- Position: Forward

Team information
- Current team: Alhaurino

Youth career
- Atlético Benamiel
- Valencia
- Atlético Madrid
- Fuengirola
- 2009–2010: Málaga

Senior career*
Years	Team	Apps	(Gls)
2010–2012	Málaga B	52	(18)
2012–2013	Austria Lustenau	13	(0)
2013–2014	Xerez	14	(13)
2014	Pobla Mafumet	6	(1)
2014–2016	Gimnàstic	10	(1)
2014–2015	→ San Roque (loan)	26	(8)
2015–2016	→ UCAM Murcia (loan)	39	(14)
2016	UCAM Murcia	1	(0)
2016–2017	Recreativo	27	(5)
2017	Logroñés	13	(1)
2018	Mérida	17	(3)
2018–2019	Antequera	38	(20)
2019	Lincoln Red Imps	0	(0)
2019–2020	Linares	22	(4)
2020–2021	Juventud Torremolinos	21	(5)
2021–2022	Antequera	29	(5)
2022–2023	Mancha Real	32	(12)
2023–2024	Real Jaén	11	(4)
2024	La Unión Atlético	15	(1)
2024	Lanzarote	7	(0)
2024–2025	Mijas-Las Lagunas	4	(1)
2025–	Alhaurino	2	(0)
- * Club domestic league appearances and goals as of 26 October 2025

Iván Aguilar Díaz (born 12 June 1991) is a Spanish professional footballer who plays for Tercera Federación club Alhaurino as a forward.

== Football career ==
Born in Benalmádena, Province of Málaga, Andalusia, Aguilar finished his formation with local Málaga CF, making his senior debuts with the B-team in the 2010–11 season, in Tercera División. In April 2011 he signed a new two-year deal with the Andalusians, appearing with the main squad in the pre-season match against Valencia CF in September.

In August 2012, free agent Aguilar went on trial at MSV Duisburg. Nothing came of it, however, and he joined SC Austria Lustenau in Austria. He appeared in his first game as a professional on 21 September, playing the last two minutes of a 0–0 away draw against Kapfenberger SV for the Football First League championship.

On 19 August 2013, after only one season, Aguilar returned to Spain, signing with freshly relegated club Xerez CD. In January of the following year, as he was his side's top scorer with 13 goals in only 14 matches, he moved to Gimnàstic de Tarragona in Segunda División B, being assigned to their farm team.

On 28 July 2014, Aguilar moved to CD San Roque de Lepe also in the third level, in a season-long loan deal. Roughly a year later, he was loaned to fellow league team UCAM Murcia CF for one year, scoring 14 times – play-offs included – in his debut campaign to help them reach Segunda División for the first time ever.

On 30 August 2016, Aguilar terminated his contract with the Murcians, and joined Recreativo Huelva. He subsequently represented UD Logroñés, Mérida AD and Antequera CF, scoring a career-best 20 goals for the latter.

On 20 June 2019, Aguilar moved to Gibraltar to sign for league champions Lincoln Red Imps. He played a UEFA Champions League first qualifying game five days later – a 1–0 loss at KF Feronikeli of Kosovo – and went back across the border on 8 July when he signed for fourth-tier Linares Deportivo.
