= 2016 Segunda División B playoffs =

Spanish football league play-offs

The 2016 Segunda División B play-offs (Playoffs de Ascenso or Promoción de Ascenso) are the final playoffs for promotion from 2015–16 Segunda División B to the 2016–17 Segunda División. The four first placed teams in each one of the four qualify for the promotion playoffs and the four last placed teams in Segunda División are relegated to Segunda División B. It also decides the teams which placed 16th to be relegated to the 2016–17 Tercera División.

== Format ==
The four group winners have the opportunity to promote directly and become the overall Segunda División B champion. The four group winners will be drawn into a two-legged series where the two winners will be promoted to the Segunda División and will enter into the final for the Segunda División B champion. The two losing semifinalists will enter the playoff round for the last two promotion spots.

The four group runners-up will be drawn against one of the three fourth-placed teams outside their group while the four third-placed teams will be drawn against each other in a two-legged series. The six winners will advance with the two losing semifinalists to determine the four teams that will enter the last two-legged series for the last two promotion spots. In all the playoff series, the lower-ranked club will play at home first. Whenever there is a tie in position (e.g. like the group winners in the Semifinal Round and Final or the third-placed teams in the first round), a draw will determine the club to play at home first.

== Group Winners promotion play-off ==
=== Qualified teams ===
The draw was held in the RFEF headquarters, in Las Rozas (Madrid).

Group	Team
1	Racing Santander
2	Real Madrid Castilla
3	Reus
4	UCAM Murcia

=== Matches ===
==== Semifinals ====
Team 1	Agg.	Team 2	1st leg	2nd leg
UCAM Murcia	4–3	Real Madrid Castilla	2–1	2–2
Racing Santander	0–4	Reus	0–3	0–1

===== First leg =====
22 May 2016	Racing Santander	0–3	Reus	Santander
17:00 (CEST)			Vítor Silva 11'; Dinis 29'; David Haro 58'	Stadium: El Sardinero; Attendance: 17,926; Referee: Cid Camacho

22 May 2016	UCAM Murcia	2–1	Real Madrid Castilla	Murcia
18:30 (CEST)	Iván Aguilar 14', 50'		Febas 11'	Stadium: La Condomina; Attendance: 4,500; Referee: Rodríguez Cervantes

===== Second leg =====
29 May 2016	Reus	1–0 (4–0 agg.)	Racing Santander	Reus
18:00 (CEST)	David Haro 6'			Stadium: Estadi Municipal; Referee: Gorostegi Fernández-Ortega

30 May 2016	Real Madrid Castilla	2–2 (3–4 agg.)	UCAM Murcia	Madrid
20:00 (CEST)	Mariano 62', 78'		Iván Aguilar 17'; Pallarès 67'	Stadium: Alfredo di Stéfano; Attendance: 5,720; Referee: Galech Apeztegia

Promoted to Segunda División
Reus (First time ever)	UCAM Murcia (First time ever)

==== Final ====
Team 1	Agg.	Team 2	1st leg	2nd leg
Reus	0–0 (3–5 p)	UCAM Murcia	0–0	0–0

===== First leg =====
5 June 2016	Reus	0–0	UCAM Murcia	Reus
12:00 (CEST)				Stadium: Estadi Municipal; Referee: Caparrós Hernández

===== Second leg =====
8 June 2016	UCAM Murcia	0–0 (0–0 agg.) (5–3 p)	Reus	Murcia
20:00 (CEST)				Stadium: La Condomina; Attendance: 2,170; Referee: Caucelo Sace
	Penalties
	Pallarès (penalty scored); Robles (penalty scored); Bueso (penalty scored); Isi (penalty scored); Aguilar (penalty scored)		Colorado (penalty scored); Vítor (penalty scored); Marín (penalty scored); Haro (penalty missed)

Segunda División B
2015–16 Winners
UCAM Murcia

== Non-champions promotion play-off ==
=== First round ===
==== Qualified teams ====
The draw was held in the RFEF headquarters, in Las Rozas (Madrid).

Group	Position	Team
1	2nd	Racing Ferrol
2	2nd	Barakaldo
3	2nd	Villarreal B
4	2nd	Murcia

Group	Position	Team
1	3rd	Tudelano
2	3rd	Socuéllamos
3	3rd	Hércules
4	3rd	Sevilla Atlético

Group	Position	Team
1	4th	UD Logroñés
2	4th	Toledo
3	4th	Lleida Esportiu
4	4th	Cádiz

==== Matches ====
Team 1	Agg.	Team 2	1st leg	2nd leg
UD Logroñés	1–1 (a)	Villarreal B	0–0	1–1
Toledo	2–1	Murcia	0–0	2–1
Lleida	2–1	Barakaldo	1–0	1–1
Cádiz	2–1	Racing Ferrol	0–0	2–1
Tudelano	0–2	Hércules	0–1	0–1
Sevilla Atlético	3–2	Socuéllamos	1–1	2–1

===== First leg =====
21 May 2016	Lleida Esportiu	1–0	Barakaldo	Lleida
18:30 (CEST)	Colinas 36'			Stadium: Camp d'Esports; Referee: González González

21 May 2016	Sevilla Atlético	1–1	Socuéllamos	Seville
19:00 (CEST)	Carlos Fernández 31' (pen.)		Javi Gómez 34'	Stadium: José Ramón Cisneros; Attendance: Pérez Paraza

21 May 2016	Cádiz	0–0	Racing Ferrol	Cádiz
21:00 (CEST)				Stadium: Ramón de Carranza; Referee: Hernández Maeso

22 May 2016	Toledo	0–0	Murcia	Toledo
17:30 (CEST)				Stadium: Salto del Caballo; Referee: Muñiz Ruiz

22 May 2016	Tudelano	0–1	Hércules	Tudela
18:00 (CEST)			Javi Flores 60'	Stadium: Ciudad de Tudela; Referee: Fernández Pérez

22 May 2016	UD Logroñés	0–0	Villarreal B	Logroño
18:30 (CEST)				Stadium: Las Gaunas; Attendance: 6,928; Referee: López Parra

===== Second leg =====
28 May 2016	Villarreal B	1–1 (1–1 (a) agg.)	UD Logroñés	Villarreal
18:00 (CEST)	Rodri 23'		Iker Alegre 10'	Stadium: Ciudad Deportiva; Referee: Pérez Muley

29 May 2016	Racing Ferrol	1–2 (1–2 agg.)	Cádiz	Ferrol
17:00 (CEST)	Joselu 67'		Álvaro García 10'; Salvi 24'	Stadium: A Malata; Referee: González Esteban

29 May 2016	Socuéllamos	1–2 (2–3 agg.)	Sevilla Atlético	Socuéllamos
17:15 (CEST)	Ocaña 89' (pen.)		Curro 51'; Carlos Fernández 78'	Stadium: Paquito Jimenéz; Referee: Sánchez López

29 May 2016	Murcia	1–2 (1–2 agg.)	Toledo	Murcia
18:00 (CEST)	Isi 70'		Mikel 45+1'; Adrián 85'	Stadium: Nueva Condomina; Referee: Benjumea Álvarez

29 May 2016	Hércules	1–0 (2–0 agg.)	Tudelano	Alicante
19:30 (CEST)	Chechu 42' (pen.)			Stadium: José Rico Pérez; Referee: González Francés

29 May 2016	Barakaldo	1–1 (1–2 agg.)	Lleida Esportiu	Barakaldo
20:00 (CEST)	Aythami 89'		Colinas 47'	Stadium: Lasesarre; Referee: Fernández Pérez

=== Second round ===
==== Qualified teams ====
The draw was held in the RFEF headquarters, in Las Rozas (Madrid).

Group	Position	Team
1	1st	Racing Santander
2	1st	Real Madrid Castilla

Group	Position	Team
3	3rd	Hércules
4	3rd	Sevilla Atlético

Group	Position	Team
1	4th	UD Logroñés
2	4th	Toledo
3	4th	Lleida Esportiu
4	4th	Cádiz

==== Matches ====
Team 1	Agg.	Team 2	1st leg	2nd leg
Lleida Esportiu	4–0	Real Madrid Castilla	1–0	3–0
Cádiz	2–0	Racing Santander	1–0	1–0
UD Logroñés	0–1	Sevilla Atlético	0–1	0–0
Toledo	2–3	Hércules	0–1	2–2

===== First leg =====
5 June 2016	Lleida Esportiu	1–0	Real Madrid Castilla	Lleida
18:30 (CEST)	Óscar Vega 8'			Stadium: Camp d'Esports; Referee: Lax Franco

5 June 2016	UD Logroñés	0–1	Sevilla Atlético	Logroño
18:30 (CEST)			Borja Lasso 71'	Stadium: Las Gaunas; Attendance: 8,314; Referee: Ortiz Arias

5 June 2016	Toledo	0–1	Hércules	Toledo
19:00 (CEST)			Chechu 72'	Stadium: Salto del Caballo; Referee: Ávalos Barrera

5 June 2016	Cádiz	1–0	Racing Santander	Cádiz
20:00 (CEST)	David Sánchez 69' (pen.)			Attendance: Ramón de Carranza; Referee: Díaz de Mera Escuderos

===== Second leg =====
11 June 2016	Real Madrid Castilla	0–3 (0–4 agg.)	Lleida Esportiu	Madrid
18:00 (CEST)			Martínez 31'; Colinas 53'; Arroyo 68'	Stadium: Alfredo di Stéfano; Attendance: 4,970; Referee: López Toca

11 June 2016	Hércules	2–2 (3–2 agg.)	Toledo	Alicante
21:00 (CEST)	David Mainz 2'; Álex Muñoz 23'		Mikel 29'; Roberto 44'	Stadium: José Rico Pérez; Referee: Varón Aceitón

12 June 2016	Sevilla Atlético	0–0 (1–0 agg.)	UD Logroñés	Seville
11:30 (CEST)				Stadium: Ciudad Deportiva; Referee: Carbajales Gómez

12 June 2016	Racing Santander	0–1 (0–2 agg.)	Cádiz	Santander
19:00 (CEST)			Álvaro García 61'	Stadium: El Sardinero; Attendance: 14,210; Referee: Moreno Aragón

=== Third round ===
==== Qualified teams ====
As there were only two third qualified teams and two four qualified teams from the same groups, there was no need to make a draw for the two finals.

Group	Position	Team
3	3rd	Hércules
4	3rd	Sevilla Atlético

Group	Position	Team
3	4th	Lleida Esportiu
4	4th	Cádiz

==== Matches ====
Team 1	Agg.	Team 2	1st leg	2nd leg
Lleida Esportiu	1–1 (4–5 p)	Sevilla Atlético	0–1	1–0
Cádiz	2–0	Hércules	1–0	1–0

===== First leg =====
19 June 2016	Lleida Esportiu	0–1	Sevilla Atlético	Lleida
19:00 (CEST)			Diego González 27'	Stadium: Camp d'Esports; Attendance: 12,748; Referee: Escriche Guzmán

19 June 2016	Cádiz	1–0	Hércules	Cádiz
20:00 (CEST)	Carlos Calvo 86'			Stadium: Ramón de Carranza; Attendance: 17,388; Referee: Pulido Santana

===== Second leg =====
26 June 2016	Sevilla Atlético	0–1 (1–1 agg.) (5–4 p)	Lleida Esportiu	Seville
11:00 (CEST)			Rodríguez 46'	Stadium: Ciudad Deportiva; Attendance: 6,000; Referee: Herrero Arenas
	Penalties
	Cotán (penalty scored); Fernández (penalty missed); Bernardo (penalty scored); Ivi (penalty scored); Carrillo (penalty scored); Churripi (penalty scored)		Martínez (penalty scored); Suárez (penalty scored); Bosch (penalty missed); Albistegi (penalty scored); Onwu (penalty scored); Rubio (penalty missed)

26 June 2016	Hércules	0–1 (0–2 agg.)	Cádiz	Alicante
21:00 (CEST)			Güiza 20'	Stadium: Rico Pérez; Referee: Iglesias Villanueva

Promoted to Segunda División
Cádiz CF (6 years later)	Sevilla Atlético (7 years later)

== Relegation play-off ==
=== Qualified teams ===
The draw was held in the RFEF headquarters, in Las Rozas (Madrid).

Group	Position	Team
1	16th	Cacereño
2	16th	Leioa
3	16th	Olímpic
4	16th	Linares

=== Matches ===
The losers of this tournament will be relegated to the 2016-17 Tercera División.

Team 1	Agg.	Team 2	1st leg	2nd leg
Cacereño	1–2	Linares	0–0	1–2
Olímpic	2–5	Leioa	1–1	1–4

==== First leg ====
22 May 2016	Cacereño	0–0	Linares	Cáceres
12:00 (CEST)				Stadium: Estadio Príncipe Felipe; Referee: Vicente del Moral

22 May 2016	Olímpic	1–1	Leioa	Xàtiva
18:00 (CEST)	San Julián 45'		Javi Bonilla 27'	Stadium: La Murta; Referee: Collado López

==== Second leg ====
29 May 2016	Linares	2–1 (2–1 agg.)	Cacereño	Linares
20:00 (CEST)	Rafa Payán 26'; Corpas 66'		Gonzalo 6'	Stadium: Linarejos; Referee: Muñoz Pérez

29 May 2016	Leioa	4–1 (5–2 agg.)	Olímpic	Leioa
20:00 (CEST)	Yanis 7', 31'; Etxaniz 85'; Gabri Gómez 90+1'		Javi Navarro 43'	Stadium: Sarriena; Referee: Ávalos Martos

Relegated to Tercera División
Cacereño (8 years later)	Olímpic (5 years later)
