= 2017 Segunda División B play-offs =

Spanish football league play-offs

The 2017 Segunda División B play-offs (Playoffs de Ascenso or Promoción de Ascenso) are the final playoffs for promotion from 2016–17 Segunda División B to the 2017–18 Segunda División. The four first placed teams in each one of the four qualify for the promotion playoffs and the four last placed teams in Segunda División are relegated to Segunda División B. It also decides the teams which placed 16th to be relegated to the 2017–18 Tercera División.

== Format ==
The four group winners have the opportunity to promote directly and become the overall Segunda División B champion. The four group winners will be drawn into a two-legged series where the two winners will be promoted to the Segunda División and will enter into the final for the Segunda División B champion. The two losing semifinalists will enter the playoff round for the last two promotion spots.

The four group runners-up will be drawn against one of the three fourth-placed teams outside their group while the four third-placed teams will be drawn against each other in a two-legged series. The six winners will advance with the two losing semifinalists to determine the four teams that will enter the last two-legged series for the last two promotion spots. In all the playoff series, the lower-ranked club will play at home first. Whenever there is a tie in position (e.g. like the group winners in the Semifinal Round and Final or the third-placed teams in the first round), a draw will determine the club to play at home first.

== Group Winners promotion play-off ==
=== Qualified teams ===
Group	Team
1	Cultural Leonesa
2	Albacete
3	Barcelona B
4	Lorca FC

=== Bracket ===
Semifinals
Albacete	1	0	1
Lorca FC (a)	1	0	1
Barcelona B	0	1	1
Cultural Leonesa	2	2	4

Finals
Lorca FC	1	1	2
Cultural Leonesa	1	3	4

=== Matches ===
==== Semifinals ====
Team 1	Agg.	Team 2	1st leg	2nd leg
Barcelona B	1–4	Cultural Leonesa	0–2	1–2
Albacete	1–1 (a)	Lorca FC	1–1	0–0

===== First leg =====
20 May 2017	Barcelona B	0–2	Cultural Leonesa	Barcelona
19:00 (CEST)		Report	Gallar 16'; Toni 52'	Stadium: Mini Estadi; Attendance: 8,194; Referee: Herrero Arenas

21 May 2017	Albacete	1–1	Lorca FC	Albacete
19:30 (CEST)	Dani Rodríguez 45+2'	Report	Abel 75'	Stadium: Carlos Belmonte; Attendance: 12,747; Referee: Domínguez Cervantes

===== Second leg =====
27 May 2017	Lorca FC	0–0 (1–1 agg.)	Albacete	Lorca
18:00 (CEST)		Report		Stadium: Francisco Artés Carrasco; Referee: Caparrós Hernández

28 May 2017	Cultural Leonesa	2–1 (4–1 agg.)	Barcelona B	León
19:00 (CEST)	Colinas 65'; Gallar 77'	Report	Alfaro 31'	Stadium: Reino de León; Attendance: 13,451; Referee: J. Iglesias Villanueva

Promoted to Segunda División
Cultural Leonesa (42 years later)	Lorca FC (First time ever)

==== Final ====
Team 1	Agg.	Team 2	1st leg	2nd leg
Lorca FC	2–4	Cultural Leonesa	1–1	1–3

1 June 2017	Lorca FC	1–1	Cultural Leonesa	Lorca
20:45 (CEST)	Poley 87' (pen.)		Toni 2'	Stadium: Francisco Artés Carrasco; Referee: Fernández Vidal

4 June 2017	Cultural Leonesa	3–1 (4–2 agg.)	Lorca FC	León
18:30 (CEST)	Molo 77' (o.g.); Benja 81'; Gallar 87'	Report	Noguera 59'	Stadium: Reino de León; Referee: López Parra

Segunda División B
2016–17 champions
Cultural Leonesa

== Non-champions promotion play-off ==
=== First round ===
==== Qualified teams ====
Group	Pos.	Team
1	2nd	Racing Santander
2	2nd	Toledo
3	2nd	Alcoyano
4	2nd	Murcia

Group	Pos.	Team
1	3rd	Celta Vigo B
2	3rd	Fuenlabrada
3	3rd	Valencia Mestalla
4	3rd	Villanovense

Group	Pos.	Team
1	4th	Pontevedra
2	4th	Rayo Majadahonda
3	4th	Atlético Baleares
4	4th	Cartagena

==== Matches ====
Team 1	Agg.	Team 2	1st leg	2nd leg
Atlético Baleares	3–1	Toledo	1–0	2–1
Cartagena	2–0	Alcoyano	0–0	2–0
Pontevedra	2–4	Murcia	1–3	1–1
Rayo Majadahonda	1–6	Racing Santander	1–3	0–3
Villanovense	2–0	Fuenlabrada	1–0	1–0
Celta Vigo B	3–6	Valencia Mestalla	2–3	1–3

===== First leg =====
20 May 2017	Pontevedra	1–3	Murcia	Pontevedra
20:00 (CEST)	Javi Bonilla 88' (pen.)	Report	Curto 21', 49'; Guardiola 40'	Stadium: Pasarón; Referee: Fernández Pérez

21 May 2017	Atlético Baleares	1–0	Toledo	Palma
12:00 (CEST)	Malik 36'	Report		Stadium: Son Malferit; Attendance: 2,000; Referee: Barceló Roca

21 May 2017	Rayo Majadahonda	1–3	Racing Santander	Majadahonda
12:00 (CEST)	Carlitos 66'	Report	Dani Aquino 58'; Borja Granero 83'; Abdón Prats 88'	Stadium: Cerro del Espino; Attendance: 3,200; Referee: Conejero Sánchez

21 May 2017	Celta Vigo B	2–3	Valencia Mestalla	Vigo
12:00 (CEST)	Juan Mera 3'; Borja Iglesias 90+5' (pen.)	Report	Quim Araújo 27'; Nacho Gil 31'; Grego 54'	Stadium: Barreiro; Attendance: 1,800; Referee: Vicente del Moral

21 May 2017	Cartagena	0–0	Alcoyano	Cartagena
18:00 (CEST)		Report		Stadium: Cartagonova; Attendance: 8,523; Referee: Escudero Marín

21 May 2017	Villanovense	1–0	Fuenlabrada	Villanueva de la Serena
18:00 (CEST)	Jesús Rubio 68' (pen.)	Report		Stadium: Romero Cuerda; Referee: Milla Alvendiz

===== Second leg =====
27 May 2017	Valencia Mestalla	3–1 (6–3 agg.)	Celta Vigo B	Valencia
18:00 (CEST)	Zotko 31'; Rafa Mir 69'; Nacho 87'	Report	Borja Iglesias 6'	Stadium: Mestalla; Attendance: 12,000; Referee: Collado López

28 May 2017	Toledo	1–2 (1–3 agg.)	Atlético Baleares	Toledo
12:00 (CEST)	Canario 9'	Report	Julio Delgado 61'; Becchio 88'	Stadium: Salto del Caballo; Referee: Moreno Aragón

28 May 2017	Racing Santander	3–0 (6–1 agg.)	Rayo Majadahonda	Santander
18:00 (CEST)	Abdón Prats 53'; Dani Aquino 69', 82'	Report		Stadium: El Sardinero; Attendance: 9,925; Referee: González Esteban

28 May 2017	Fuenlabrada	0–1 (0–2 agg.)	Villanovense	Fuenlabrada
18:00 (CEST)		Report	Jesús Rubio 56' (pen.)	Stadium: Fernando Torres; Referee: Pérez Peraza

28 May 2017	Murcia	1–1 (4–2 agg.)	Pontevedra	Murcia
19:00 (CEST)	Guardiola 78'	Report	Eizmendi 51'	Stadium: Nueva Condomina; Attendance: 10,355; Referee: Varón Aceitón

28 May 2017	Alcoyano	0–2 (0–2 agg.)	Cartagena	Alcoy
20:00 (CEST)		Report	Jiménez 54'; Jesús 71'	Stadium: El Collao; Referee: Calderiña Pavón

=== Second round ===
==== Qualified teams ====
Group	Pos.	Team
2	1st	Albacete
3	1st	Barcelona B

Group	Pos.	Team
1	2nd	Racing Santander
4	2nd	Murcia

Group	Pos.	Team
3	3rd	Valencia Mestalla
4	3rd	Villanovense

Group	Pos.	Team
3	4th	Atlético Baleares
4	4th	Cartagena

==== Matches ====
Team 1	Agg.	Team 2	1st leg	2nd leg
Atlético Baleares	2–3	Albacete	1–1	1–2 (a.e.t.)
Cartagena	2–2 (a)	Barcelona B	1–2	1–0
Villanovense	2–4	Racing Santander	2–0	0–4
Valencia Mestalla	2–1	Murcia	2–1	0–0

===== First leg =====
4 June 2017	Atlético Baleares	1–1	Albacete	Palma
12:00 (CEST)	Disco 90+2' (pen.)	Report	José Fran 46'	Stadium: Son Malferit; Referee: Gálvez Rascón

4 June 2017	Valencia Mestalla	2–1	Murcia	Valencia
18:00 (CEST)	Quim Araújo 34', 58'	Report	Ortiz 44'	Stadium: Mestalla; Referee: Alemán Pérez

4 June 2017	Cartagena	1–2	Barcelona B	Cartagena
19:00 (CEST)	Germán 55'	Report	Dani Romera 51'; Gumbau 81'	Stadium: Cartagonova; Attendance: 9,152; Referee: García Aceña

4 June 2017	Villanovense	2–0	Racing Santander	Villanueva de la Serena
19:00 (CEST)	Jesús Rubio 57' (pen.); Mustafa 77'	Report		Stadium: Romero Cuerda; Referee: Peña Varela

===== Second leg =====
10 June 2017	Barcelona B	0–1 (2–2 agg.)	Cartagena	Barcelona
19:00 (CEST)		Report	Sergio García 79'	Stadium: Mini Estadi; Attendance: 4,585; Referee: Sánchez Alba

11 June 2017	Albacete	2–1 (a.e.t.) (3–2 agg.)	Atlético Baleares	Albacete
12:00 (CEST)	Aketxe 75'; David Prieto 118' (o.g.)	Report	Jurado 57'	Stadium: Carlos Belmonte; Attendance: 7,512; Referee: Sánchez López

11 June 2017	Racing Santander	4–0 (4–2 agg.)	Villanovense	Santander
18:00 (CEST)	Beobide 25'; Castañeda 72'; Abdón 76'; Santi Jara 79'	Report		Stadium: El Sardinero; Attendance: 18,323; Referee: Soto Grado

11 June 2017	Murcia	0–0 (1–2 agg.)	Valencia Mestalla	Murcia
19:00 (CEST)		Report		Stadium: Nueva Condomina; Attendance: 21,311; Referee: Ripoll Solano

=== Third round ===
==== Qualified teams ====
Group	Pos.	Team
2	1st	Albacete
3	1st	Barcelona B

Group	Pos.	Team
1	2nd	Racing Santander

Group	Pos.	Team
3	3rd	Valencia Mestalla

==== Matches ====
Team 1	Agg.	Team 2	1st leg	2nd leg
Valencia Mestalla	0–1	Albacete	0–1	0–0
Racing Santander	1–4	Barcelona B	1–4	0–0

===== First leg =====
17 June 2017	Valencia Mestalla	0–1	Albacete	Valencia
19:00 (CEST)		Report	Eloy 28'	Stadium: Mestalla; Attendance: 23,000; Referee: Pérez Muley

18 June 2017	Racing Santander	1–4	Barcelona B	Santander
18:00 (CEST)	Abdón 14'		Cardona 40', 43'; Dani Romera 66', 81'	Stadium: El Sardinero; Attendance: 21,824; Referee: Galech Apezteguía

===== Second leg =====
25 June 2017	Barcelona B	0–0 (4–1 agg.)	Racing Santander	Barcelona
20:15 (CEST)		Report		Stadium: Mini Estadi; Attendance: 8,101; Referee: Francisco José Hernández Maeso

25 June 2017	Albacete	0–0 (1–0 agg.)	Valencia Mestalla	Albacete
20:30 (CEST)		Report		Stadium: Carlos Belmonte

Promoted to Segunda División
Albacete (One year later)	Barcelona B (2 years later)

== Relegation play-off ==
=== Qualified teams ===
Group	Pos.	Team
1	16th	Burgos
2	16th	San Sebastián de los Reyes
3	16th	Atlético Levante
4	16th	Linares

=== Matches ===
The losers of this series will be relegated to the 2017–18 Tercera División.

Team 1	Agg.	Team 2	1st leg	2nd leg
Atlético Levante	0–0 (1–3 p)	San Sebastián de los Reyes	0–0	0–0 (a.e.t.)
Burgos	2–1	Linares	0–0	2–1

==== First leg ====
21 May 2017	Atlético Levante	0–0	San Sebastián de los Reyes	Buñol
17:30 (CEST)		Report		Stadium: Ciudad Deportiva; Referee: García Verdura

21 May 2017	Burgos	0–0	Linares	Burgos
18:00 (CEST)		Report		Stadium: El Plantío; Referee: Recio Moreno

==== Second leg ====
28 May 2017	San Sebastián de los Reyes	0–0 (0–0 agg.) (3–1 p)	Atlético Levante	San Sebastián de los Reyes
18:00 (CEST)		Report		Stadium: Nuevo Matapiñoneras; Referee: Pulido Santana
	Penalties
	Negredo (penalty scored); Arranz (penalty scored); Ortiz (penalty scored)		(penalty scored) Álex Gil; (penalty missed) Manzanara; (penalty missed) Molina; (penalty missed) Hacen

28 May 2017	Linares	1–2 (1–2 agg.)	Burgos	Linares
18:00 (CEST)	Chus Hevia 80'	Report	Diego Suárez 63'; Montero 90+1'	Stadium: Linarejos; Referee: Lax Franco

Relegated to Tercera División
Atlético Levante	Linares
