= Javi Gómez =

Javi Gómez is a given name. Notable people with the name include:

- Francisco Javier Gómez Torrijos (born 1982), Spanish footballer known as Javi Gómez
- Javier Gómez Puebla, Spanish footballer known as Javi Gómez
- Javier González Gómez, Spanish footballer known as Javi González
