= Meseguer =

Meseguer is a surname. Notable people with the surname include:

- Álvaro Meseguer (born 1992), Spanish footballer
- Jose Meseguer (born 1950), Spanish computer scientist
- Ona Meseguer (born 1988), Spanish water polo player
- Silvia Meseguer (born 1989), Spanish footballer
- Víctor Meseguer (born 1999), Spanish footballer
