= Quim Araújo =

Spanish footballer

Personal information
- Full name: Joaquim Araújo Delgado
- Date of birth: 10 March 1988 (age 38)
- Place of birth: Barcelona, Spain
- Height: 1.82 m (6 ft 0 in)
- Position: Forward

Team information
- Current team: Santomera

Youth career
- Escuela Grasshoppers
- Lloreda
- Sant Gabriel
- 1999–2000: Espanyol
- 2000–2001: Gramenet
- 2001–2002: Ferrán Martorell
- 2002–2005: Premià
- 2005–2007: Badalona

Senior career*
Years	Team	Apps	(Gls)
2007	Badalona B	8	(1)
2007–2009	Gramenet B	59	(10)
2009–2011	Montañesa	72	(26)
2011–2014	Sant Andreu	108	(15)
2014–2015	Compostela	34	(5)
2015–2016	Eldense	21	(4)
2016–2017	Valencia B	56	(9)
2017–2018	Albacete	7	(1)
2018–2019	Córdoba	21	(1)
2019–2020	Cartagena	24	(1)
2020–2022	Lleida Esportiu	39	(3)
2022	Águilas	17	(1)
2022–2023	Mar Menor	32	(3)
2023–2025	Torrent	52	(5)
2025–	Santomera	5	(2)
- * Club domestic league appearances and goals as of 9 November 2025

Joaquim "Quim" Araújo Delgado (born 10 March 1988) is a Spanish footballer who plays as a forward for Tercera Federación club Santomera.

== Club career ==
Born in Barcelona, Catalonia, Araújo made his debut as a senior with CF Badalona's reserves in 2007, in the regional leagues. After subsequently representing UDA Gramenet B, he signed for Tercera División side CF Montañesa in July 2009.

Araújo first arrived in Segunda División B on 1 July 2011, after agreeing to a contract with UE Sant Andreu. On 8 July 2014, after being an undisputed starter, he moved to fellow league team SD Compostela.

On 24 July 2015 Araújo joined CD Eldense, still in the third division. The following 29 January he signed for another reserve team, Valencia CF Mestalla in the same category, for €25,000.

On 3 July 2017, after impressing with Mestalla in the 2017 Segunda División B play-offs, Araújo agreed to a contract with Albacete Balompié, newly promoted to Segunda División. He made his professional debut on 20 August, coming on as a late substitute for Jon Erice.

Araújo scored his first professional goal on 24 September 2017, netting the winner in a 2–1 home defeat of Real Oviedo. The following 31 January, he signed a two-and-a-half-year contract with fellow league team Córdoba CF.

On 19 July 2019, Araújo signed a one-year deal with FC Cartagena in division three, after cutting ties with the Blanquiverdes.
