= Juan Durán =

Juan Durán may refer to:

- Juan Durán de Miranda, Spanish governor of New Mexico
- Juan Durán (footballer) (born 2001), Spanish footballer
