= Juan Durán (footballer) =

Spanish footballer (born 2001)

Personal information
- Full name: Juan Durán Dueñas
- Date of birth: 8 January 2001 (age 25)
- Place of birth: Alcalá de Henares, Spain
- Height: 1.80 m (5 ft 11 in)
- Position: Left back

Team information
- Current team: Rayo Majadahonda
- Number: 23

Youth career
- Alcalá
- Getafe

Senior career*
Years	Team	Apps	(Gls)
2020–2021	Alcalá	26	(2)
2021–2023	Mirandés B	46	(2)
2021–2023	Mirandés	3	(0)
2023–2024	Fuenlabrada	27	(0)
2024–2025	Navalcarnero	30	(1)
2025–	Rayo Majadahonda	32	(1)
- * Club domestic league appearances and goals as of 16 May 2026

Juan Durán Dueñas (born 8 January 2001) is a Spanish footballer who plays as a left back for Segunda Federación club Rayo Majadahonda.

== Club career ==
Born in Alcalá de Henares, Madrid, Durán represented RSD Alcalá and Getafe CF as a youth. On 10 August 2020, after finishing his formation, he returned to Alcalá and was assigned to the first team in Tercera División.

Durán made his senior debut on 18 October 2020, coming on as a second-half substitute in a 1–1 home draw against AD Torrejón CF. He scored his first goals the following 5 May, netting a brace in a 2–1 away win over Real Aranjuez CF.

On 7 July 2021, Durán moved to CD Mirandés and was initially assigned to the reserves in Tercera División RFEF. He made his first team debut on 1 December 2021, coming on as a late substitute for Víctor Sanchís in a 3–0 away win over CD San Roque de Lepe, in the season's Copa del Rey.

Durán made his professional debut with the Jabatos on 27 May 2022, replacing Imanol García de Albéniz in a 5–1 home routing of CF Fuenlabrada. On 4 July 2023, he signed a two-year contract with Primera Federación side CF Fuenlabrada.

On 29 August 2024, Durán moved to Navalcarnero in the fourth tier.
