= Txiki (footballer, born 1977) =

Spanish footballer

Personal information
- Full name: Daniel Rodríguez Pérez
- Date of birth: 27 March 1977 (age 49)
- Place of birth: San Sebastián, Spain
- Height: 1.73 m (5 ft 8 in)
- Position: Midfielder

Youth career
- CD Oliver

Senior career*
Years	Team	Apps	(Gls)
1996–1997	Utebo		
1997–1998	Andorra	30	(1)
1998–1999	Beasain	37	(6)
1999–2001	Cultural Leonesa	95	(14)
2002–2004	Racing Santander	47	(4)
2004	→ Córdoba (loan)	19	(1)
2004–2006	Córdoba	73	(12)
2006–2008	Castellón	44	(0)
2008–2009	Ceuta	27	(4)
2009–2010	Zamora	31	(1)
Total		403	(43)
- * Club domestic league appearances and goals

Daniel Rodríguez Pérez (born 27 March 1977), known as Txiki, is a Spanish former professional footballer who played as a left midfielder.

== Club career ==
Txiki was born in San Sebastián, Gipuzkoa. He spent his first years as a senior in the lower leagues, with Utebo FC, Andorra CF, SD Beasain and Cultural y Deportiva Leonesa. On 10 October 2001, his 47th-minute free kick was the only goal of the Copa del Rey fixture against Racing de Santander, as Cultural went through to the round of 32; two months later, he signed for that adversary.

On 5 January 2002, Txiki made his debut in the Segunda División, coming on as a 60th-minute substitute for Sietes in a 2–1 home win over Polideportivo Ejido. The following month, he scored in consecutive matches as his team defeated Real Jaén (2–0) then drew 2–2 at SD Eibar, being an important member of the Quique Setién-led squad as they promoted to La Liga as runners-up.

Txiki made the first of his 26 top-flight appearances (for Racing and overall) on 31 August 2002, starting the 0–1 home loss to Real Valladolid. He returned to division two in the next transfer window, joining Córdoba CF initially on loan.

After two further second-tier seasons with CD Castellón, Txiki retired aged 33 following one-year spells in the third with AD Ceuta and Zamora CF.
