= Israel García (footballer, born 2004) =

Spanish footballer

Isra García
Personal information
- Full name: Israel García Montero
- Date of birth: 29 January 2004 (age 22)
- Place of birth: Leganés, Spain
- Height: 1.82 m (6 ft 0 in)
- Position: Attacking midfielder

Team information
- Current team: Linares
- Number: 11

Youth career
- Lugo Fuenlabrada
- 2012–2013: Atlético Madrid
- 2013–2021: Rayo Vallecano
- 2021–2022: Alcorcón

Senior career*
Years	Team	Apps	(Gls)
2022–2024	Alcorcón B	53	(6)
2022–2024	Alcorcón	5	(0)
2024–	Linares	43	(1)
- * Club domestic league appearances and goals as of 15 May 2026

Israel "Isra" García Montero (born 29 January 2004) is a Spanish footballer who plays as an attacking midfielder for Linares Deportivo.

== Club career ==
Born in Leganés, Community of Madrid, García played for CDE Lugo Fuenlabrada, Atlético Madrid and Rayo Vallecano as a youth, before joining AD Alcorcón's Juvenil side in August 2021. On 13 February 2022, before even appearing with the reserves, he made his professional debut by coming on as a second-half substitute for Borja Valle in a 0–2 Segunda División home loss against CD Tenerife.

On 9 July 2024, García signed a two-year contract with Linares Deportivo in Segunda Federación.
