= Chus Hevia =

Spanish footballer

Personal information
- Full name: Jesús Hevia Martín
- Date of birth: 11 May 1990 (age 36)
- Place of birth: Oviedo, Spain
- Height: 1.80 m (5 ft 11 in)
- Position: Winger

Team information
- Current team: Gijón Industrial (young)

Youth career
- 2005–2008: Real Madrid
- 2008–2009: Villarreal

Senior career*
Years	Team	Apps	(Gls)
2009–2012	Recreativo B	61	(11)
2010	Recreativo	2	(0)
2012	Oviedo B	15	(5)
2012–2014	Marino	53	(16)
2014–2015	Cartagena	32	(11)
2015–2016	Racing Santander	11	(2)
2016–2017	Cartagena	33	(6)
2017	Linares	17	(5)
2017–2018	Marbella	31	(5)

Managerial career
- 2020–: Gijón Industrial (young)
- * Club domestic league appearances and goals as of 27 May 2018

Jesús 'Chus' Hevia Martín (born 11 May 1990) is a Spanish manager and former footballer who played mainly as a left winger.

He is the manager of Gijón Industrial youth since 2020.

== Club career ==
Born in Oviedo, Asturias, Hevia started playing as a senior with Recreativo de Huelva B in the 2009–10 season, in Tercera División, after playing youth football with Real Madrid and Villarreal CF. On 13 June of the following year he made his first-team debut, coming on as a second-half substitute in a 1–0 home success over FC Cartagena, in the Segunda División championship.

On 12 January 2012 Hevia rescinded his link with the Andalusians, signing with Real Oviedo and being assigned to the B-side also in the fourth level. On 26 June he signed with Marino de Luanco, in Segunda División B.

On 28 June 2014, after scoring a ten goals in the 2013–14 campaign, Hevia moved to another club in the third level, FC Cartagena. On 13 July of the following year he joined fellow league team Racing de Santander.

In August 2018, after a serious knee lesion, Hevia retired as footballer and started his manager career at Marbella FC.
