= Utebo FC =

Association football club in Spain

Utebo
- Full name: Utebo Fútbol Club
- Founded: 1924
- Ground: Santa Ana, Utebo, Aragon, Spain
- Capacity: 5,000
- Chairman: (Spain) Alfonso Orcajo
- Manager: (Spain) Rubén Zapater
- League: Segunda Federación – Group 2
- 2025–26: Segunda Federación – Group 2, 4th of 18
Home colours	Away colours

Utebo Fútbol Club is a Spanish football team based in Utebo, in the autonomous community of Aragon. Founded in 1924 it plays in Segunda Federación – Group 2, holding home games at Estadio Santa Ana, with a capacity of 5,000 seats.

== Season to season ==
Season	Tier	Division	Place	Copa del Rey
1929–1949	—	Regional	—	
1949–50	5	2ª Reg.	(R)	
1950–51	5	2ª Reg.		
1951–52	5	2ª Reg.		
1952–53	5	2ª Reg.		
1953–54	4	1ª Reg.	1st	
1954–55	3	3ª	5th	
1955–56	3	3ª	10th	
1956–57	3	3ª	17th	
1957–58	3	3ª	15th	
1958–59	3	3ª	15th	
1959–60	4	1ª Reg.	(R)	
1960–61	DNP			
1961–62	DNP			
1962–63	5	2ª Reg.		
1963–64	4	1ª Reg.	4th	
1964–65	4	1ª Reg.	1st	
1965–66	3	3ª	9th	
1966–67	3	3ª	12th	
1967–68	3	3ª	14th	

Season	Tier	Division	Place	Copa del Rey
1968–69	4	Reg. Pref.	1st	
1969–70	3	3ª	20th	First round
1970–71	4	Reg. Pref.	13th	
1971–72	4	Reg. Pref.	14th	
1972–73	4	Reg. Pref.	18th	
1973–74	5	1ª Reg.	1st	
1974–75	4	Reg. Pref.	16th	
1975–76	4	Reg. Pref.	13th	
1976–77	4	Reg. Pref.	14th	
1977–78	5	Reg. Pref.	19th	
1978–79	6	1ª Reg.	15th	
1979–80	6	1ª Reg.	18th	
1980–81	7	2ª Reg.	9th	
1981–82	7	2ª Reg.	10th	
1982–83	7	2ª Reg.	11th	
1983–84	7	2ª Reg.	9th	
1984–85	7	2ª Reg.	1st	
1985–86	6	1ª Reg.	9th	
1986–87	6	1ª Reg.	5th	
1987–88	5	Reg. Pref.	4th	

Season	Tier	Division	Place	Copa del Rey
1988–89	5	Reg. Pref.	3rd	
1989–90	5	Reg. Pref.	1st	
1990–91	4	3ª	12th	
1991–92	4	3ª	3rd	
1992–93	4	3ª	2nd	Third round
1993–94	3	2ª B	19th	
1994–95	4	3ª	3rd	Second round
1995–96	4	3ª	2nd	
1996–97	4	3ª	10th	
1997–98	4	3ª	13th	
1998–99	4	3ª	9th	
1999–2000	4	3ª	8th	
2000–01	4	3ª	7th	
2001–02	4	3ª	8th	
2002–03	4	3ª	6th	
2003–04	4	3ª	1st	
2004–05	4	3ª	2nd	Preliminary
2005–06	4	3ª	5th	
2006–07	4	3ª	2nd	
2007–08	4	3ª	11th	First round

Season	Tier	Division	Place	Copa del Rey
2008–09	4	3ª	7th	
2009–10	4	3ª	9th	
2010–11	4	3ª	3rd	
2011–12	4	3ª	4th	
2012–13	4	3ª	4th	
2014–15	4	3ª	9th	
2015–16	4	3ª	8th	
2016–17	4	3ª	3rd	
2017–18	4	3ª	9th	
2018–19	4	3ª	6th	
2019–20	4	3ª	13th	
2020–21	4	3ª	3rd / 6th	
2021–22	5	3ª RFEF	2nd	
2022–23	4	2ª Fed.	4th	First round
2023–24	4	2ª Fed.	4th	First round
2024–25	4	2ª Fed.	4th	First round
2025–26	4	2ª Fed.	4th	First round
2026–27	4	2ª Fed.		TBD

- 1 season in Segunda División B
- 5 seasons in Segunda Federación
- 38 seasons in Tercera División
- 1 season in Tercera División RFEF

== Current squad ==
As of 1 March 2026

Note: Flags indicate national team as defined under FIFA eligibility rules; some limited exceptions apply. Players may hold more than one non-FIFA nationality.

No.	Pos.	Nation	Player
1	GK	ESP	Jorge Chanza
3	DF	ESP	Franc Mateu
4	DF	ESP	Álvaro Meseguer
5	DF	ESP	Jorge Adán
6	DF	ESP	Eneko Azurmendi
7	FW	ESP	Iñaki Alberca (on loan from Alavés C)
8	MF	ESP	David Marín
9	FW	ESP	Iñigo López
10	FW	ESP	Diego Suárez
11	FW	ESP	Manu Sesé
13	GK	ESP	Pablo Puyod
14	MF	ESP	Carlos Llamas

No.	Pos.	Nation	Player
15	DF	ESP	Víctor Sanchís
16	FW	ESP	José Manuel Pedrosa
17	MF	ESP	Ces Cotos
18	MF	ESP	Álex Aguado
19	FW	ESP	Juan Delgado
20	MF	CHI	Camilo Leiton
21	MF	ESP	Carlos Beitia
22	DF	ESP	Sergio Mendinueta
23	DF	ESP	Marcos Valhondo (on loan from Zaragoza B)
25	GK	ESP	Pablo Sanz
28	FW	ESP	David Rivera
29	MF	ESP	Carlos Cocian

== Honours ==
- Tercera División: 2003–04

== Famous players ==
- (Spain) Cani
- (Spain) Txiki
- (Spain) Miguel Linares
