= 2016–17 Segunda División B =

Segunda División B
- Season: 2016–17
- Champions: Cultural Leonesa
- Promoted: Cultural Leonesa; Lorca FC; Barcelona B Albacete
- Relegated: Mutilvera; Palencia; Arandina; Somozas; Mensajero; Socuéllamos; Sestao River; Zamudio; Mallorca B Atlético Levante; L'Hospitalet; Espanyol B Prat; Eldense; Linares; Atlético Sanluqueño; Atlético Mancha Real; Jaén; La Roda
- Biggest home win: Barcelona B 12–0 Eldense (1 April 2017)
- Biggest away win: Toledo 0–6 Albacete (26 November 2016)
- Highest scoring: Barcelona B 12–0 Eldense (1 April 2017)
- Highest attendance: 23,000; Valencia Mestalla 0–1 Albacete (17 June 2017)

The 2016–17 Segunda División B season was the 40th since its establishment. The first matches of the season were played in August 2016, and the season ended in June 2017 with the promotion play-off finals.

== Overview before the season ==
80 teams will join the league, including four relegated from the 2015–16 Segunda División and 18 promoted from the 2015–16 Tercera División. The composition of the groups is a proposal of the Royal Spanish Football Federation that was confirmed on 15 July 2016.

Relegated from Segunda División

- Ponferradina
- Llagostera
- Albacete
- Bilbao Athletic

Promoted from Tercera División

- At. Mancha Real
- At. Sanluqueño
- Boiro
- Caudal
- Córdoba B
- El Ejido
- Extremadura
- Gavà
- Mallorca B
- Mutilvera
- Navalcarnero
- Osasuna B
- Palencia
- Prat
- Saguntino
- SS Reyes
- San Fernando
- Zamudio

== Group 1 ==
Location of teams in 2016–17 Segunda División B Group 1

=== Stadia and locations ===
Team	Home city	Stadium	Capacity
Arandina	Aranda de Duero	El Montecillo	6,000
Boiro	Boiro	Barraña	1,500
Burgos	Burgos	El Plantío	12,200
Caudal	Mieres	Hermanos Antuña	2,850
Celta B	Vigo	Barreiro	4,500
Coruxo	Coruxo, Vigo	O Vao	1,200
Cultural Leonesa	León	Reino de León	13,451
Guijuelo	Guijuelo	Estadio Municipal	1,500
Izarra	Estella-Lizarra	Merkatondoa	3,500
Lealtad	Villaviciosa	Les Caleyes	3,000
Mutilvera	Aranguren	Valle Aranguren	1,000
Osasuna B	Pamplona	Tajonar	4,000
Palencia	Palencia	La Balastera	8,070
Ponferradina	Ponferrada	El Toralín	8,800
Pontevedra	Pontevedra	Pasarón	12,000
Racing Ferrol	Ferrol	A Malata	12,042
Racing Santander	Santander	El Sardinero	22,222
Somozas	As Somozas	Pardiñas	1,000
Tudelano	Tudela	Ciudad de Tudela	11,000
Valladolid B	Valladolid	Anexos José Zorrilla	1,500

=== League table ===
Pos	Team	Pld	W	D	L	GF	GA	GD	Pts	Qualification or relegation
1	Cultural Leonesa (C, O, P)	38	26	8	4	86	28	+58	86 (Note: Cultural Leonesa is ahead of Racing Santander on head-to-head points: Cultural Leonesa–Racing Santander 0–0, Racing Santander–Cultural Leonesa 2–3.)	Qualification for the group champions' playoffs and Copa del Rey
2	Racing Santander	38	26	8	4	64	20	+44	86	Qualification for the promotion playoffs and Copa del Rey
3	Celta Vigo B	38	26	6	6	76	31	+45	84	Qualification for the promotion playoffs
4	Pontevedra	38	17	9	12	48	36	+12	60	Qualification for the promotion playoffs and Copa del Rey
5	Ponferradina	38	14	13	11	35	40	−5	55	Qualification for the Copa del Rey
6	Valladolid B	38	15	9	14	40	42	−2	54 (Note: Valladolid B is ahead of Racing Ferrol on head-to-head points: Valladolid B–Racing Ferrol 1–0, Racing Ferrol–Valladolid B 1–2.)	
7	Racing Ferrol	38	15	9	14	50	38	+12	54	Qualification for the Copa del Rey
8	Coruxo	38	13	10	15	43	58	−15	49 (Note: Coruxo is ahead of Tudelano on head-to-head points: Coruxo–Tudelano 1–1, Tudelano–Coruxo 0–2.)	
9	Tudelano	38	12	13	13	32	34	−2	49	
10	Lealtad	38	12	12	14	38	39	−1	48	
11	Osasuna B	38	13	8	17	48	53	−5	47 (Note: Osasuna B is ahead of Guijuelo on head-to-head goal difference: Osasuna B–Guijuelo 3–1, Guijuelo–Osasuna B 3–2.)	
12	Guijuelo	38	12	11	15	57	49	+8	47	
13	Izarra	38	11	13	14	37	45	−8	46	
14	Boiro (Note: Boiro was relegated to Tercera División due to unpaid debts to their players.) (R)	38	11	12	15	39	45	−6	45 (Note: Boiro is ahead of Caudal and Burgos on head-to-head points: Boiro 8 pts, Caudal 5 pts, Burgos 3 pts.)	Relegation to Tercera División
15	Caudal	38	11	12	15	47	56	−9	45	
16	Burgos (O)	38	12	9	17	43	54	−11	45	Qualification for the relegation playoffs
17	Mutilvera (R)	38	9	16	13	32	46	−14	43	Relegation to Tercera División
18	Palencia (Note: After being relegated to Tercera División, Palencia was relegated to Primera Regional due to unpaid debts to their players.) (R)	38	10	8	20	26	60	−34	38	Relegation to Primera Regional
19	Arandina (R)	38	7	11	20	39	64	−25	32	Relegation to Tercera División
20	Somozas (R)	38	5	9	24	23	65	−42	24	Relegation to Tercera División

Source: BDFutbol.com
Rules for classification: 1) points; 2) head-to-head points; 3) head-to-head goal difference; 4) goal difference; 5) number of goals scored; 6) fair-play points; 7) playoff match
(C) Champions; (O) Play-off winners; (P) Promoted; (R) Relegated

=== Results ===
Home \ Away	ARA	BOI	BUR	CAU	CEL	COR	CUL	GUI	IZA	LEA	MUT	OSA	PAL	PNF	PNT	RFE	RSA	SOM	TUD	VAD
Arandina	—	1–0	2–1	2–0	3–3	4–0	1–4	0–0	0–1	0–2	2–0	0–0	1–2	0–0	0–2	1–4	1–5	3–0	1–4	0–1
Boiro	3–0	—	5–1	0–0	1–4	3–0	2–0	2–2	1–1	0–1	2–2	0–2	0–0	0–1	1–1	1–1	0–1	2–1	0–1	1–0
Burgos	2–1	0–2	—	3–4	2–0	3–1	0–3	0–0	2–3	3–0	0–1	2–1	0–1	0–0	0–0	2–1	0–1	1–0	2–2	0–0
Caudal	1–1	1–1	1–2	—	3–2	2–1	0–0	2–0	1–0	0–1	2–2	3–1	2–0	2–2	2–1	0–0	2–3	2–0	0–1	4–0
Celta Vigo B	5–0	0–3	4–1	2–1	—	1–0	0–1	2–1	2–1	2–1	2–2	3–1	2–0	3–0	1–0	1–0	1–1	6–0	3–0	1–0
Coruxo	3–2	2–0	1–1	3–1	0–4	—	1–3	1–3	2–1	2–0	3–1	1–0	1–0	1–1	2–2	0–2	1–2	2–1	1–1	1–1
Cultural Leonesa	5–3	2–0	2–0	3–1	1–2	3–1	—	3–1	3–1	3–1	5–1	1–0	6–0	0–0	3–0	3–1	0–0	2–0	1–1	3–0
Guijuelo	1–1	4–0	1–1	4–1	1–3	2–2	0–4	—	8–1	0–3	0–0	3–2	6–0	0–0	1–1	2–2	1–0	2–0	0–3	3–0
Izarra	1–1	1–1	1–0	0–1	0–0	0–0	0–0	2–2	—	1–1	2–0	2–1	3–1	2–0	1–0	1–1	0–3	2–0	0–0	0–2
Lealtad	0–0	2–2	2–1	1–1	0–1	3–0	1–1	2–1	0–0	—	1–0	2–0	0–1	2–2	0–1	2–0	0–1	3–1	0–0	0–0
Mutilvera	1–0	0–1	0–2	2–1	1–1	0–0	0–1	0–1	0–0	0–0	—	1–1	2–1	1–0	0–0	1–1	1–1	0–2	0–0	3–1
Osasuna B	4–2	1–0	0–1	3–3	0–0	0–1	2–1	3–1	0–0	4–2	0–0	—	3–1	3–0	2–1	1–2	0–3	3–1	1–3	2–1
Palencia	1–3	2–0	0–0	2–0	1–3	1–2	0–4	2–1	0–3	1–0	1–4	0–0	—	0–2	0–0	1–3	0–1	1–1	0–0	1–0
Ponferradina	3–2	2–0	4–2	0–0	1–0	1–0	1–3	1–0	2–1	0–0	3–2	1–1	0–2	—	1–0	1–1	1–0	0–1	0–0	2–1
Pontevedra	2–1	4–0	2–1	0–0	0–4	1–1	2–2	2–1	2–0	3–0	3–0	3–1	2–1	2–0	—	1–0	0–1	4–2	2–1	2–0
Racing Ferrol	2–0	0–1	1–1	4–0	2–1	5–2	2–3	0–1	1–2	1–0	0–1	1–0	4–1	2–1	1–0	—	0–1	0–0	0–1	1–2
Racing Santander	0–0	3–2	2–0	4–0	0–1	0–1	1–1	1–0	2–1	1–0	4–0	4–1	1–0	3–0	2–0	1–1	—	3–0	2–1	2–1
Somozas	0–0	0–0	1–2	2–2	0–2	1–1	0–2	0–3	0–1	2–3	1–2	0–2	0–1	1–1	1–0	0–2	1–1	—	0–1	0–3
Tudelano	0–0	0–0	0–2	1–0	1–2	0–2	1–0	1–0	2–1	3–2	1–1	1–2	0–0	0–1	0–1	0–1	0–2	0–1	—	1–3
Valladolid B	1–0	1–2	4–2	2–1	1–2	2–0	1–4	1–0	2–1	0–0	0–0	2–0	0–0	2–0	2–1	1–0	1–1	1–1	0–0	—

Source: BDFútbol
Legend: Blue = home team win; Yellow = draw; Red = away team win.

=== Top goalscorers ===
Last updated 14 May 2017

Goalscorers	Goals	Team
(Spain) Borja Iglesias	32	Celta Vigo B
(Spain) Benja Martínez	24	Cultural Leonesa
(Spain) Dani Aquino	23	Racing Santander
(Spain) Joselu	18	Racing Ferrol
(Spain) Álex Gallar	17	Cultural Leonesa

=== Top goalkeepers ===
Last updated 14 May 2017

Goalkeeper	Goals	Matches	Average	Team
(Spain) Iván Crespo	20	36	0.56	Racing Santander
(Spain) Mikel Pagola	31	35	0.89	Tudelano
(Spain) Edu Sousa	34	37	0.92	Pontevedra
(Romania) Dinu Moldovan	32	33	0.97	Ponferradina
(Spain) Javi Porrón	37	36	1.03	Lealtad

== Group 2 ==
Location of teams in 2016–17 Segunda División B Group 2
Location of Segunda División B in the Canary Islands – Group 2 teams 2016–17

=== Stadia and locations ===
Team	Home city	Stadium	Capacity
Albacete	Albacete	Carlos Belmonte	17,300
Amorebieta	Amorebieta-Etxano	Urritxe	3,000
Arenas	Getxo	Gobela	1,221
Barakaldo	Barakaldo	Lasesarre	7,960
Bilbao Athletic	Bilbao	Lezama	1,500
Fuenlabrada	Fuenlabrada	Fernando Torres	2,500
Gernika	Guernica	Urbieta	3,000
Leioa	Leioa	Sarriena	3,500
Mensajero	Santa Cruz de La Palma	Silvestre Carrillo	5,000
Navalcarnero	Navalcarnero	Mariano González	1,571
Rayo Majadahonda	Majadahonda	Cerro del Espino	3,376
Real Madrid Castilla	Madrid	Alfredo Di Stéfano	12,000
Real Sociedad B	San Sebastián	Zubieta	2,500
Real Unión	Irun	Stadium Gal	6,344
San Sebastián de los Reyes	San Sebastián de los Reyes	Matapiñonera	3,000
Sestao River	Sestao	Las Llanas	8,905
Socuéllamos	Socuéllamos	Paquito Jiménez	2,000
Toledo	Toledo	Salto del Caballo	5,300
UD Logroñés	Logroño	Las Gaunas	16,000
Zamudio	Zamudio	Gazituaga	5,000

=== League table ===
Pos	Team	Pld	W	D	L	GF	GA	GD	Pts	Qualification or relegation
1	Albacete (O, P)	38	20	9	9	64	36	+28	69	Qualification for the group champions' playoffs and Copa del Rey
2	Toledo	38	19	8	11	38	34	+4	65	Qualification for the promotion playoffs and Copa del Rey
3	Fuenlabrada	38	18	9	11	54	42	+12	63	Qualification for the promotion playoffs and Copa del Rey
4	Rayo Majadahonda	38	16	13	9	43	36	+7	61	Qualification for the promotion playoffs and Copa del Rey
5	Leioa	38	16	12	10	53	42	+11	60	Qualification for the Copa del Rey
6	UD Logroñés	38	15	11	12	50	33	+17	56 (Note: UD Logorñés is ahead of Real Unión and Bilbao Athletic on head-to-head points: UD Logorñés 8 pts, Real Unión 7 pts, Bilbao Athletic 1 pt.)	Qualification for the Copa del Rey
7	Real Unión	38	14	14	10	39	38	+1	56	
8	Bilbao Athletic	38	15	11	12	45	33	+12	56	
9	Arenas	38	14	13	11	50	46	+4	55	
10	Real Sociedad B	38	13	13	12	55	43	+12	52	
11	Real Madrid Castilla	38	13	12	13	43	47	−4	51	
12	Gernika	38	12	13	13	47	52	−5	49 (Note: Gernika is ahead of Barakaldo on head-to-head points: Gernika–Barakaldo 2–0, Barakaldo–Gernika 0–1.)	
13	Barakaldo	38	12	13	13	46	42	+4	49	
14	Amorebieta	38	13	9	16	47	47	0	48	
15	Navalcarnero	38	11	14	13	38	42	−4	47 (Note: Navalcarnero is ahead of San Sebastián de los Reyes on head-to-head points: Navalcarnero–San Sebastián de los Reyes 1–1, San Sebastián de los Reyes–Navalcarnero 0–1.)	
16	San Sebastián de los Reyes (O)	38	13	8	17	47	51	−4	47	Qualification for the relegation playoffs
17	Mensajero (R)	38	10	16	12	40	47	−7	46	Relegation to Tercera División
18	Socuéllamos (R)	38	10	8	20	42	62	−20	38	Relegation to Tercera División
19	Sestao River (R)	38	8	13	17	28	46	−18	37	Relegation to Tercera División
20	Zamudio (R)	38	5	7	26	33	84	−51	22	Relegation to Tercera División

Source: BDFutbol.com
Rules for classification: 1) points; 2) head-to-head points; 3) head-to-head goal difference; 4) goal difference; 5) number of goals scored; 6) fair-play points; 7) playoff match
(O) Play-off winners; (P) Promoted; (R) Relegated

=== Results ===
Home \ Away	ALB	AMO	ARE	BAR	BAT	FUE	GER	LEI	MEN	NAV	RAY	RMC	RSO	RUN	SSR	SES	SOC	TOL	LOG	ZAM
Albacete	—	1–0	2–1	3–0	0–0	0–4	3–2	1–2	3–0	3–0	0–1	0–0	0–1	2–0	3–0	0–0	1–1	0–1	1–0	3–0
Amorebieta	0–1	—	2–2	2–2	2–1	2–1	3–1	1–3	1–1	0–0	1–0	2–2	0–0	3–1	2–1	2–1	4–1	1–2	1–0	1–0
Arenas	3–1	2–1	—	1–1	0–0	2–1	2–4	4–3	1–0	1–0	2–2	1–1	1–1	0–0	1–1	0–0	1–0	2–0	1–2	2–1
Barakaldo	1–1	0–1	2–1	—	1–0	1–1	0–1	1–2	4–0	3–2	1–1	1–1	1–2	0–1	0–0	1–1	4–0	3–0	0–0	2–0
Bilbao Athletic	1–2	0–0	1–1	0–1	—	1–0	2–1	2–2	1–1	1–0	2–0	2–1	1–0	1–2	1–0	0–0	3–0	3–0	1–1	5–0
Fuenlabrada	1–2	1–0	1–0	1–1	0–0	—	4–2	1–0	3–0	0–2	3–2	1–1	2–0	1–0	3–2	2–1	1–0	0–1	2–1	4–2
Gernika Club	2–1	0–0	2–0	2–0	1–0	1–2	—	0–1	0–0	4–1	0–1	0–0	0–0	2–2	1–1	1–0	3–2	1–0	1–0	1–1
Leioa	0–0	2–3	2–2	2–0	1–3	0–0	1–1	—	2–0	2–0	1–2	1–1	1–0	2–0	3–0	1–1	0–1	2–1	1–1	2–2
Mensajero	1–2	3–2	1–2	1–1	1–0	1–1	3–2	1–2	—	1–1	0–0	2–2	2–1	1–1	2–0	4–1	1–1	0–1	0–1	5–1
Navalcarnero	1–3	2–0	2–0	0–1	0–1	0–0	1–1	0–2	1–1	—	1–1	2–0	1–1	2–0	1–1	2–0	3–1	0–0	2–1	2–0
Rayo Majadahonda	0–0	2–0	3–2	1–2	1–0	1–1	2–0	2–2	3–0	0–0	—	0–1	3–3	2–0	2–0	1–1	1–0	0–0	1–0	2–0
Real Madrid Castilla	3–1	3–2	1–3	2–1	1–0	2–1	0–0	1–0	0–1	1–1	0–1	—	3–2	1–2	1–1	2–0	3–0	0–2	0–4	1–0
Real Sociedad B	2–2	1–0	4–2	0–0	1–0	1–2	4–0	1–3	0–0	3–1	4–0	1–2	—	1–1	3–1	0–0	3–2	1–1	0–2	5–0
Real Unión	0–0	1–0	0–0	2–2	3–1	1–0	2–2	2–1	0–0	1–3	2–0	1–0	2–2	—	1–1	1–0	1–1	1–0	0–0	2–1
San Sebastián de los Reyes	2–1	2–1	1–4	2–3	1–1	5–1	2–1	0–1	0–1	0–1	4–1	2–1	1–0	3–0	—	0–1	1–0	2–3	1–2	2–0
Sestao River	1–3	1–0	1–2	3–2	0–1	0–2	2–1	1–1	1–1	1–0	0–0	1–0	1–4	0–2	1–3	—	0–0	1–1	0–1	2–0
Socuéllamos	2–4	2–1	1–0	2–1	1–2	1–3	2–2	2–0	1–1	2–2	0–0	1–3	2–0	0–2	2–3	3–1	—	0–1	2–1	3–0
Toledo	0–6	1–1	1–0	2–1	1–1	1–0	1–1	3–0	2–0	0–0	0–1	1–0	1–0	1–0	0–1	1–0	1–0	—	1–0	5–1
UD Logroñés	3–4	2–1	0–0	0–1	5–3	1–1	5–1	1–1	1–2	4–0	1–0	4–0	0–0	1–0	0–0	1–1	2–0	1–0	—	1–1
Zamudio	0–4	1–4	0–1	1–0	1–3	4–2	1–2	0–1	1–1	1–1	1–3	2–2	2–3	1–1	1–0	0–2	1–3	3–1	2–0	—

Source: BDFútbol
Legend: Blue = home team win; Yellow = draw; Red = away team win.

=== Top goalscorers ===
Last updated 14 May 2017

Goalscorers	Goals	Team
(Spain) Dioni Villalba	24	Fuenlabrada
(Spain) Héctor Hernández	20	Albacete
(Spain) Aridane Santana	16	Albacete
(Spain) Lolo Pla	14	Toledo
(Spain) Jorge Galán	14	Real Unión

=== Top goalkeepers ===
Last updated 14 May 2017

Goalkeeper	Goals	Matches	Average	Team
(Spain) Unai Simón	23	29	0.79	Bilbao Athletic
(Spain) Pablo Alcolea	28	35	0.8	Toledo
(Spain) Miguel Martínez	29	34	0.85	UD Logroñés
(Spain) Tomeu Nadal	36	37	0.97	Albacete
(Spain) Jon Altamira	35	29	1.21	Gernika

== Group 3 ==
Location of teams in 2016–17 Segunda División B Group 3

=== Stadia and locations ===
Team	Home city	Stadium	Capacity
Alcoyano	Alcoy	El Collao	4,880
Atlético Baleares	Palma	Son Malferit	1,000
Atlético Levante	Valencia	Ciudad Deportiva	3,000
Atlético Saguntino	Sagunto	Morvedre	4,000
Badalona	Badalona	Municipal (Note: Badalona played at Montigalà, with a capacity of 1,500, until matchday 22.)	4,170
Barcelona B	Barcelona	Mini Estadi	15,276
Cornellà	Cornellà de Llobregat	Nou Camp	1,500
Ebro	Zaragoza	El Carmen	1,200
Eldense	Elda	Nuevo Pepico Amat	4,036
Espanyol B	Sant Adrià de Besòs	Dani Jarque	6,000
Gavà	Gavà	La Bòbila	5,000
Hércules	Alicante	José Rico Pérez	30,000
L'Hospitalet	L'Hospitalet de Llobregat	La Feixa Llarga	6,740
Llagostera	Llagostera	Palamós Costa Brava	3,724
Lleida Esportiu	Lleida	Camp d'Esports	13,000
Mallorca B	Palma	Son Bibiloni	1,900
Prat	El Prat de Llobregat	Sagnier	500
Sabadell	Sabadell	Nova Creu Alta	11,981
Valencia Mestalla	Valencia	Antonio Puchades	3,000
Villarreal B	Villarreal	Ciudad Deportiva	5,000

=== League table ===
Pos	Team	Pld	W	D	L	GF	GA	GD	Pts	Qualification or relegation
1	Barcelona B (O, P)	38	25	7	6	83	29	+54	82	Qualification for the group champions' playoffs
2	Alcoyano	38	18	13	7	56	32	+24	67	Qualification for the promotion playoffs and Copa del Rey
3	Valencia Mestalla	38	17	14	7	59	45	+14	65	Qualification for the promotion playoffs
4	Atlético Baleares	38	16	13	9	47	33	+14	61	Qualification for the promotion playoffs and Copa del Rey
5	Badalona	38	15	15	8	48	34	+14	60 (Note: Badalona is ahead of Villarreal B on head-to-head points: Badalona–Villarreal B 1–0, Villarreal B–Badalona 2–2.)	Qualification for the Copa del Rey
6	Villarreal B	38	16	12	10	57	40	+17	60	
7	Hércules	38	17	6	15	50	40	+10	57	Qualification for the Copa del Rey
8	Lleida Esportiu	38	15	11	12	41	41	0	56	Qualification for the Copa del Rey
9	Cornellà	38	13	13	12	44	46	−2	52	
10	Gavà (Note: Gavà was relegated to Tercera División due to unpaid debts to their players.) (R)	38	13	11	14	48	50	−2	50	Relegation to Tercera División
11	Atlético Saguntino	38	12	13	13	42	40	+2	49 (Note: Atlético Saguntino is ahead of Ebro on total goal difference.)	
12	Ebro	38	11	16	11	33	38	−5	49	
13	Mallorca B (Note: Since first team Mallorca was relegated to the Segunda División B, reserve team Mallorca B was automatically relegated to Tercera División.) (R)	38	11	15	12	34	35	−1	48	Relegation to Tercera División
14	Llagostera	38	12	11	15	40	47	−7	47	
15	Sabadell	38	9	19	10	37	39	−2	46	
16	Atlético Levante (R)	38	8	18	12	33	34	−1	42	Qualification for the relegation playoffs
17	L'Hospitalet (R)	38	9	11	18	33	58	−25	38	Relegation to Tercera División
18	Espanyol B (R)	38	8	12	18	37	50	−13	36	Relegation to Tercera División
19	Prat (R)	38	7	14	17	27	43	−16	35	Relegation to Tercera División
20	Eldense (R)	38	3	6	29	23	98	−75	15	Relegation to Tercera División

Source: BDFutbol.com
Rules for classification: 1) points; 2) head-to-head points; 3) head-to-head goal difference; 4) goal difference; 5) number of goals scored; 6) fair-play points; 7) playoff match
(O) Play-off winners; (P) Promoted; (R) Relegated

=== Results ===
Home \ Away	ALC	ATB	LEV	SAG	BAD	BAR	COR	EBR	ELD	ESP	GAV	HER	HOS	LLA	LLE	MLL	PRA	SAB	VAL	VIL
Alcoyano	—	1–1	2–2	0–2	0–0	3–2	1–1	2–0	4–2	3–0	2–1	3–0	3–1	2–0	3–1	1–0	3–2	0–0	3–0	0–0
Atlético Baleares	1–0	—	1–1	1–1	0–1	2–1	1–0	1–1	5–0	0–0	2–2	0–1	2–0	0–0	2–1	2–1	1–0	1–1	1–0	2–2
Atlético Levante	0–0	0–1	—	0–1	4–1	0–0	0–1	1–1	0–0	2–0	2–1	3–1	0–1	2–0	0–0	1–2	1–0	0–0	1–1	1–1
Atlético Saguntino	1–0	0–0	0–0	—	0–0	1–3	1–2	1–2	5–2	3–0	0–0	0–0	4–1	1–1	1–0	0–0	3–0	0–1	2–2	1–1
Badalona	1–1	3–1	3–1	0–2	—	0–2	1–1	1–1	6–0	1–0	1–0	0–0	1–0	0–1	1–0	0–0	0–0	1–2	2–0	1–0
Barcelona B	1–1	2–1	1–1	3–1	1–3	—	0–1	3–0	12–0	1–1	4–0	2–0	4–0	4–0	1–0	2–1	2–0	2–0	3–1	3–2
Cornellà	1–0	0–0	2–1	1–1	1–1	0–2	—	2–0	3–1	0–0	0–4	2–2	2–0	1–1	3–2	1–2	1–2	0–0	1–2	1–0
Ebro	1–1	0–0	0–1	1–2	2–0	1–2	0–0	—	1–0	0–0	0–0	1–0	1–1	2–0	2–1	2–2	2–0	0–0	1–1	0–0
Eldense	0–2	0–5	1–3	0–1	1–4	0–1	4–4	2–2	—	0–2	0–1	0–2	1–2	2–0	0–0	1–1	1–0	0–5	0–2	0–1
Espanyol B	0–2	1–3	0–0	1–2	2–3	0–2	2–0	1–2	3–2	—	1–2	2–2	3–2	2–0	1–1	0–0	3–1	3–0	0–1	0–2
Gavà	1–1	1–2	2–1	4–0	2–0	1–0	3–1	1–2	2–1	2–1	—	0–4	1–1	0–2	3–1	0–0	2–2	1–0	4–5	1–1
Hércules	1–3	2–0	1–0	2–0	1–3	1–3	1–0	2–0	5–0	2–1	2–1	—	1–1	1–0	2–0	4–0	0–2	1–0	0–2	2–3
L'Hospitalet	2–1	0–4	1–0	1–0	0–0	2–2	1–2	1–0	2–0	0–0	1–1	0–2	—	1–0	2–3	0–1	0–0	2–1	1–2	2–2
Llagostera	1–2	2–1	2–0	2–0	2–2	0–2	3–0	3–0	2–0	1–1	1–0	2–1	1–1	—	0–1	0–1	2–1	1–1	1–1	2–2
Lleida Esportiu	2–1	1–0	1–1	2–1	3–2	0–2	0–2	1–0	2–0	1–1	0–0	1–0	2–1	2–1	—	2–1	2–0	3–2	1–1	1–1
Mallorca B	0–1	0–0	0–0	2–1	0–0	2–3	0–3	0–0	0–1	1–1	2–1	0–2	3–1	4–0	0–0	—	0–0	0–0	1–0	0–1
Prat	2–1	0–1	0–0	1–0	0–0	0–0	1–1	0–1	1–0	1–0	0–1	1–1	4–0	1–1	1–1	0–2	—	1–1	1–1	0–0
Sabadell	1–1	1–0	2–2	1–1	0–2	1–1	0–0	0–1	1–1	3–2	2–0	1–0	0–0	0–3	1–1	1–1	3–1	—	1–1	1–0
Valencia Mestalla	1–1	5–0	1–1	0–0	1–1	0–4	2–1	3–3	2–0	2–1	4–1	1–0	3–1	1–1	1–0	0–2	3–0	2–2	—	3–2
Villarreal B	0–1	1–2	2–0	3–2	2–2	2–0	4–2	2–0	4–0	0–1	1–1	2–1	1–0	4–1	0–1	3–2	2–1	3–1	0–1	—

Source: BDFútbol
Legend: Blue = home team win; Yellow = draw; Red = away team win.

=== Top goalscorers ===
Last updated 14 May 2017

Goalscorers	Goals	Team
(Spain) Boris Garrós	26	Gavà
(Spain) Carlos Martínez	20	Villarreal B
(Spain) Gerard Oliva	18	Badalona
(Spain) Enric Gallego	16	Cornellà
(Spain) Dani Romera	15	Barcelona B

=== Top goalkeepers ===
Last updated 14 May 2017

Goalkeeper	Goals	Matches	Average	Team
(Spain) Marc Martínez	25	30	0.83	Alcoyano
(Spain) Oinatz Aulestia	30	34	0.88	Atlético Baleares
(Spain) José Miguel Morales	34	38	0.89	Badalona
(Spain) José Aurelio Suárez	26	29	0.9	Barcelona B
(Spain) Adrián Lluna	34	36	0.94	Atlético Saguntino

== Group 4 ==
Location of teams in 2016–17 Segunda División B Group 4

=== Stadia and locations ===
Team	Home city	Stadium	Capacity
Atlético Mancha Real	Mancha Real	La Juventud	1,500
Atlético Sanluqueño	Sanlúcar de Barrameda	El Palmar	5,000
Cartagena	Cartagena	Cartagonova	15,105
Córdoba B	Córdoba	Rafael Gómez	3,000
El Ejido	El Ejido	Santo Domingo	7,870
Extremadura	Almendralejo	Francisco de la Hera	11,580
Granada B	Granada	Miguel Prieto	2,500
Jaén	Jaén	La Victoria	12,800
Jumilla	Jumilla	La Hoya	3,000
La Roda	La Roda	Estadio Municipal	3,000
Linares	Linares	Linarejos	10,000
Linense	La Línea de la Concepción	Municipal	12,000
Lorca FC	Lorca	Artés Carrasco	8,120
Marbella	Marbella	Municipal	8,000
Melilla	Melilla	Álvarez Claro	12,000
Mérida	Mérida	Romano	14,600
Murcia	Murcia	Nueva Condomina	31,179
Recreativo	Huelva	Nuevo Colombino	21,670
San Fernando	San Fernando	Iberoamericano	12,000
Villanovense	Villanueva de la Serena	Romero Cuerda	6,000

=== League table ===
Pos	Team	Pld	W	D	L	GF	GA	GD	Pts	Qualification or relegation
1	Lorca FC (O, P)	38	21	10	7	52	39	+13	73	Qualification for the group champions' playoffs and Copa del Rey
2	Murcia	38	19	10	9	48	29	+19	67	Qualification for the promotion playoffs and Copa del Rey
3	Villanovense	38	18	12	8	55	32	+23	66	Qualification for the promotion playoffs and Copa del Rey
4	Cartagena	38	18	11	9	49	35	+14	65	Qualification for the promotion playoffs and Copa del Rey
5	Mérida	38	18	10	10	51	33	+18	64	Qualification for the Copa del Rey
6	Melilla	38	14	18	6	39	25	+14	60	Qualification for the Copa del Rey
7	Marbella	38	16	10	12	46	45	+1	58	Qualification for the Copa del Rey
8	Granada B	38	14	11	13	60	48	+12	53	
9	Linense	38	13	13	12	41	48	−7	52	
10	Jumilla	38	12	12	14	32	37	−5	48 (Note: Jumilla is ahead of Córdoba B on head-to-head points: Jumilla–Córdoba B 2–1, Córdoba B–Jumilla 0–1.)	
11	Córdoba B	38	12	12	14	43	42	+1	48	
12	Recreativo	38	10	17	11	35	41	−6	47	
13	Extremadura	38	11	13	14	37	48	−11	46 (Note: Extremadura is ahead of El Ejido and San Fernando on head-to-head points: Extremadura 8 pts, El Ejido 7 pts, San Fernando 1 pt.)	
14	El Ejido	38	13	7	18	40	47	−7	46	
15	San Fernando	38	13	7	18	42	52	−10	46	
16	Linares (R)	38	12	9	17	40	46	−6	45	Qualification for the relegation playoffs
17	Atlético Sanluqueño (R)	38	10	9	19	36	51	−15	39	Relegation to Tercera División
18	Atlético Mancha Real (R)	38	10	8	20	44	64	−20	38	Relegation to Tercera División
19	Jaén (R)	38	7	16	15	37	43	−6	37	Relegation to Tercera División
20	La Roda (R)	38	5	13	20	36	58	−22	28	Relegation to Tercera División

Source: BDFutbol.com
Rules for classification: 1) points; 2) head-to-head points; 3) head-to-head goal difference; 4) goal difference; 5) number of goals scored; 6) fair-play points; 7) playoff match
(O) Play-off winners; (P) Promoted; (R) Relegated

=== Results ===
Home \ Away	MRE	SLU	CAR	COR	EJI	EXT	GRA	JAE	JUM	ROD	LNR	LNS	LOR	MAR	MEL	MER	MUR	REC	SFE	VNV
Atlético Mancha Real	—	4–0	0–2	0–1	3–2	1–2	1–0	1–1	0–0	1–0	2–3	1–3	0–1	1–2	0–0	0–1	3–1	1–2	2–1	1–5
Atlético Sanluqueño	4–1	—	0–1	1–2	0–1	3–0	2–1	2–0	1–0	1–0	2–1	0–0	0–1	0–0	1–2	2–2	1–3	0–0	0–1	2–0
Cartagena	3–1	2–0	—	1–2	2–0	1–1	2–1	1–0	2–2	5–3	2–0	1–1	0–1	3–0	1–1	1–2	1–3	0–0	2–1	1–1
Córdoba B	0–1	1–1	1–2	—	1–0	0–0	1–3	1–2	0–1	1–1	2–1	3–0	4–0	2–2	2–2	1–0	0–0	1–0	0–1	0–1
El Ejido	1–0	1–1	1–0	2–0	—	1–1	0–3	0–0	1–0	2–2	1–0	1–1	0–3	0–1	0–2	0–0	2–3	6–1	4–0	0–2
Extremadura	0–3	2–0	0–2	0–0	1–0	—	1–1	1–1	4–0	0–2	1–2	1–0	0–3	2–0	0–1	1–1	0–2	1–1	1–1	1–1
Granada B	1–1	2–2	1–1	2–1	3–1	2–3	—	3–2	1–0	2–1	3–0	3–0	0–1	1–2	1–1	3–0	1–1	2–2	2–1	2–1
Jaén	2–2	4–2	2–0	2–0	0–1	1–2	2–1	—	0–0	0–1	0–0	5–2	0–0	2–0	0–0	0–1	0–0	1–3	4–2	1–1
Jumilla	2–1	1–0	0–1	2–1	0–3	2–0	3–2	2–0	—	1–0	1–0	1–1	1–1	0–1	1–2	0–1	2–0	4–2	1–2	1–1
La Roda	2–3	1–1	1–1	2–5	1–2	0–0	3–2	0–0	1–1	—	1–2	0–0	2–3	0–1	1–1	0–0	0–4	0–1	1–2	2–2
Linares	1–1	2–0	1–1	1–1	2–0	1–3	1–0	3–1	2–0	2–1	—	0–0	1–1	1–2	1–2	0–1	0–1	0–1	3–0	2–1
Linense	3–1	3–1	2–0	1–1	2–1	1–0	1–1	0–0	1–0	1–0	2–2	—	2–0	0–2	2–1	2–5	3–1	0–0	0–2	0–2
Lorca FC	3–0	3–1	0–1	1–1	2–1	0–0	2–1	2–1	2–2	3–2	1–1	3–2	—	2–1	0–2	2–0	1–0	1–0	1–3	2–1
Marbella	3–2	0–1	2–1	3–1	1–0	3–2	1–2	2–2	0–0	1–1	2–0	1–1	1–2	—	1–0	2–1	1–1	3–1	2–3	0–1
Melilla	1–2	1–0	1–1	2–1	2–0	0–1	1–1	2–1	0–0	2–1	2–0	0–1	1–1	0–0	—	4–0	0–0	0–0	1–0	0–0
Mérida	3–0	0–0	0–1	1–2	2–0	5–1	1–0	1–0	2–0	3–0	1–0	5–1	2–2	3–0	0–0	—	0–0	1–0	3–0	2–2
Murcia	3–1	1–0	0–0	2–0	2–0	3–0	2–1	2–0	0–0	0–1	2–0	1–0	2–0	1–0	0–0	2–0	—	2–2	0–1	2–1
Recreativo	3–0	2–4	0–1	0–0	0–1	2–1	0–0	0–0	0–0	0–0	0–3	1–0	0–0	1–1	1–1	1–1	3–0	—	1–0	1–0
San Fernando	1–1	1–0	0–2	0–2	2–3	1–3	2–2	1–1	1–0	0–1	4–1	0–1	0–1	1–1	0–0	2–0	3–1	2–2	—	0–1
Villanovense	1–1	4–0	3–0	2–1	1–1	0–0	1–3	1–0	0–1	2–1	0–0	1–1	3–0	3–1	3–1	1–0	1–0	3–1	1–0	—

Source: BDFútbol
Legend: Blue = home team win; Yellow = draw; Red = away team win.

=== Top goalscorers ===
Last updated 14 May 2017

Goalscorers	Goals	Team
(Spain) Víctor Curto	18	Murcia
(Brazil) Matheus Aias	17	Lorca FC
(Spain) Airam Benito	17	Atlético Mancha Real
(Spain) Chumbi	15	Lorca FC
(Spain) Antonio Megías	15	La Roda

=== Top goalkeepers ===
Last updated 14 May 2017

Goalkeeper	Goals	Matches	Average	Team
(Spain) Dani Barrio	23	37	0.62	Melilla
(Spain) Limones	24	30	0.8	Cartagena
(Spain) Wilfred Muñoz	30	37	0.81	Villanovense
(Spain) Jero Lario	32	33	0.97	Jumilla
(Spain) Francisco Dorronsoro	34	33	1.03	Lorca FC

== Attendance data ==
This is a list of attendance data of the teams that give an official number. They include playoffs games:

Pos	Team	Total	High	Low	Average	Change
1	Racing Santander	187,614	21,824	5,453	8,528	+28.1%
2	Murcia	156,666	21,311	3,628	7,460	+36.0%
3	Cartagena	145,351	12,376	4,450	6,921	+44.5%
4	Albacete	138,898	12,747	3,854	6,314	−4.7%^{1}
5	Cultural Leonesa	115,489	13,451	1,635	5,499	+192.7%
6	Ponferradina	67,285	5,468	2,061	3,541	−29.6%^{1}
7	Sabadell	49,572	8,934	1,298	2,609	+22.8%
8	Barcelona B	51,342	8,124	843	2,334	+54.2%
9	UD Logroñés	43,911	3,000	1,883	2,311	−28.5%
10	Real Madrid Castilla	18,302	1,555	590	963	−56.9%

Notes:
1: Team played last season in Segunda División.
