= Migue Marín =

Spanish footballer

Personal information
- Full name: Miguel Marín Prieto
- Date of birth: 19 February 1990 (age 36)
- Place of birth: Alicún de Ortega, Spain
- Height: 1.73 m (5 ft 8 in)
- Position: Left back

Team information
- Current team: Alcantarilla

Youth career
- Granada 74
- Villarreal

Senior career*
Years	Team	Apps	(Gls)
2009–2010	Toledo	1	(0)
2010–2011	Granada B	24	(1)
2011–2013	Murcia B	60	(3)
2012	Murcia	1	(0)
2013–2014	Elche B	36	(2)
2014–2016	Reus	41	(0)
2016–2017	Mérida	36	(1)
2017–2018	Atlético Baleares	21	(1)
2018–2019	Jumilla	33	(0)
2020–2021	Orihuela	32	(0)
2021–2022	Linares Deportivo	32	(0)
2022–2023	UCAM Murcia	13	(0)
2023	El Ejido	15	(0)
2023–2024	Racing Cartagena MM	23	(0)
2024–	Alcantarilla	3	(0)
- * Club domestic league appearances and goals as of 13 October 2024

Miguel 'Migue' Marín Prieto (born 19 February 1990) is a Spanish footballer who plays as a left back for Tercera Federación club Alcantarilla.

== Club career ==
Born in Alicún de Ortega, Province of Granada, Andalusia, Marín graduated from Villarreal CF's youth setup, and made his senior debuts with CD Toledo in the 2009–10 campaign, in Segunda División B. In the 2010 summer he moved to Granada CF B in the regional leagues, appearing regularly for the latter.

In July 2011, Marín joined another reserve side, Real Murcia Imperial of the Tercera División. On 20 May 2012 he first appeared with the first team, playing the last 15 minutes in a 2–2 home draw against Gimnàstic de Tarragona in the Segunda División.

On 12 July 2013, Marín signed for Elche CF, being assigned to the reserves who competed in the Segunda División B. On 24 June of the following year, after being a regular starter, he joined CF Reus Deportiu also in division three.

The Catalans won promotion via the playoffs in 2016, though Marín played just nine times over the whole campaign. In June that year, he left for more game time at Mérida AD. Following one season at the Estadio Romano in the third tier, he spent the next two years at that level with Atlético Baleares and FC Jumilla.

On 13 December 2019, Marín signed with Orihuela CF until the end of the season.
