= Jorge Chanza =

Spanish footballer

Personal information
- Full name: Jorge Chanza Zapata
- Date of birth: 20 March 1998 (age 28)
- Place of birth: Segorbe, Spain
- Height: 1.82 m (6 ft 0 in)
- Position: Goalkeeper

Team information
- Current team: Utebo
- Number: 1

Youth career
- 2004–2014: Villarreal
- 2014–2016: Valencia
- 2016–2017: Valladolid

Senior career*
Years	Team	Apps	(Gls)
2017–2018	Eldense	0	(0)
2018–2019	Ciudad de Ibiza	14	(0)
2019–2022	Sant Rafel	47	(0)
2022–2023	Ibiza	1	(0)
2023–	Utebo	40	(0)
- * Club domestic league appearances and goals as of 7 May 2026

Jorge Chanza Zapata (born 20 March 1998) is a Spanish professional footballer who plays as a goalkeeper for Segunda Federación club Utebo.

== Club career ==
Born in Segorbe, Castellón, Valencian Community, Chanza played for Villarreal CF, Valencia CF and Real Valladolid as a youth. On 28 July 2017, he signed for Tercera División side CD Eldense, but spent the campaign as a backup to veteran Chema.

On 30 July 2018, Chanza moved to UD Ibiza in Segunda División B, being the third-choice option in the main squad while playing for farm teams Ciudad de Ibiza CF and CF Sant Rafel. On 5 July 2021, after the main squad's promotion to Segunda División, he renewed his contract for a further year.

A backup to Germán Parreño and Álex Domínguez in 2021–22, Chanza played regularly for Sant Rafel as they suffered relegation. Still a third-choice to Germán and Daniel Fuzato in 2022–23, he made his professional debut on 20 May 2023, replacing Germán late into a 1–0 home win over Real Zaragoza, as his side were already relegated.

Chanza moved to Segunda Federación side Utebo FC in 2023, and renewed his contract for a further year on 22 April 2024.
