= Mikel Pagola =

Spanish footballer

Personal information
- Full name: Mikel Pagola Biurrun
- Date of birth: 4 March 1982 (age 44)
- Place of birth: Pamplona, Spain
- Height: 1.94 m (6 ft 4 1/2 in)
- Position: Goalkeeper

Senior career*
Years	Team	Apps	(Gls)
2000–2001	Oberena		
2001–2004	Osasuna B	37	(0)
2003–2004	→ Ponferradina (loan)	1	(0)
2004–2005	Burgos	21	(0)
2005	Badalona	4	(0)
2006	Móstoles	19	(0)
2006–2007	Guijuelo	33	(0)
2007–2008	Salamanca	16	(0)
2009	Ponferradina	2	(0)
2009–2010	Alavés	19	(0)
2010–2011	Badajoz	35	(0)
2011–2013	Linense	55	(0)
2013–2014	El Palo	37	(0)
2014–2020	Tudelano	208	(0)
- * Club domestic league appearances and goals

Mikel Pagola Biurrun (born 4 March 1982) is a Spanish former footballer who played as a goalkeeper.

Apart from 18 months with Salamanca in Segunda División, he spent the vast majority of his career in Segunda División B, where he made over 450 appearances in service of 11 teams.

== Club career ==
Born in Pamplona, Navarre, Pagola began his senior career with CD Oberena in Tercera División and joined Segunda División B team CA Osasuna B in 2001, also having a season on loan at SD Ponferradina before switching to Burgos CF in 2004; he continued competing in the latter level in the following years, being relegated with CD Móstoles in 2005–06.

Pagola earned his first transfer to a professional club, UD Salamanca of Segunda División, in the summer of 2007. He made the first of his 18 competitive appearances for the Castile and León side on 5 September, in a 1–2 home loss against Elche CF in the second round of the Copa del Rey. On 19 January 2008, having fallen to third-choice behind Alberto and Biel Ribas, he terminated his contract and returned to division three with Ponferradina.

After again being featured sparingly at the Estadio El Toralín, Pagola represented in quick succession and always in the third tier Deportivo Alavés, CD Badajoz, Real Balompédica Linense, CD El Palo and CD Tudelano. With the latter, for whom he signed in 2014, he had good form in the second half of the 2015–16 campaign, beating José Manuel Domínguez Vilches' clean sheet record of 976 minutes without conceding a goal in the competition and eventually Abel Resino's of 1,275 across all Spanish football, racking up 1,342 before letting in the only goal of a home defeat to Hércules CF in the promotion play-offs.
