= Diego Suárez (footballer, born 1994) =

Spanish footballer

Personal information
- Full name: Diego Suárez Hernández
- Date of birth: 10 October 1994 (age 32)
- Place of birth: Zaragoza, Spain
- Height: 1.86 m (6 ft 1 in)
- Position: Forward

Team information
- Current team: Utebo
- Number: 10

Youth career
- Zaragoza

Senior career*
Years	Team	Apps	(Gls)
2012–2015	Zaragoza B	79	(24)
2013–2016	Zaragoza	15	(0)
2015–2016	→ Lleida Esportiu (loan)	31	(5)
2016–2017	Burgos	30	(2)
2017–2018	Guijuelo	36	(3)
2018–2019	Ejea	35	(2)
2019–2021	Tudelano	50	(8)
2021–2022	Numancia	31	(4)
2022–	Utebo	100	(28)
- * Club domestic league appearances and goals as of 14 May 2026

Diego Suárez Hernández (born 10 October 1994) is a Spanish footballer who plays for Utebo as a forward.

== Club career ==
Born in Zaragoza, Aragon, Suárez graduated from local Real Zaragoza's youth system. He made his senior debuts with the reserves in the 2011–12 campaign, in Segunda División B.

On 2 November 2013 Suárez made his debut with the main squad, replacing Barkero in a 2–3 loss at SD Eibar in the Segunda División championship. On 16 July 2015 he signed a new two-year contract with the club, being loaned to Lleida Esportiu in a season-long deal.
