= Miguel Marín (Mexican footballer) =

Mexican footballer (born 1989)

Miguel José Marín Pérez (born February 16, 1989) is a Mexican professional footballer who plays as a goalkeeper for Atlante of Ascenso MX on loan from Sinaloa.
