= Álvaro Meseguer =

Spanish footballer

Personal information
- Full name: Álvaro Meseguer Fallado
- Date of birth: 24 July 1992 (age 34)
- Place of birth: Alcañiz, Spain
- Height: 1.78 m (5 ft 10 in)
- Position: Centre-back

Team information
- Current team: Utebo
- Number: 4

Youth career
- 2005–2011: Zaragoza

Senior career*
Years	Team	Apps	(Gls)
2011–2015	Zaragoza B	60	(1)
2015	Zaragoza	1	(0)
2015–2021	Tudelano	119	(7)
2021–2022	Ebro	26	(1)
2022–	Utebo	113	(5)
- * Club domestic league appearances and goals as of 14 May 2026

Álvaro Meseguer Fallado (born 24 July 1992) is a Spanish footballer who plays for Utebo FC as a centre-back.

== Football career ==
Meseguer was born in Alcañiz, Teruel, Aragon, and graduated from local Real Zaragoza's youth setup. He made his senior debuts with the reserves in the 2010–11 campaign in the Tercera División.

On 15 July 2014 Meseguer renewed his link with the club, after being captain in the previous season. On 14 March of the following year he played his first match as a professional, coming on as a late substitute for fellow youth graduate Diego Rico in a 0–0 home draw against CD Lugo in the Segunda División.
