= 2015–16 Segunda División B =

Segunda División B
- Season: 2015–16
- Champions: UCAM Murcia
- Promoted: UCAM Murcia; Reus Deportiu; Cádiz; Sevilla Atlético
- Top goalscorer: Mariano Díaz (25 goals)
- Biggest home win: Arenas 5–0 Leioa (5 September 2015); Celta B 6–1 Arandina (20 September 2015); Lleida Esportiu 5–0 Llosetense (11 October 2015); Olot 5–0 Eldense (1 November 2015); Coruxo 5–0 Guijuelo (8 November 2015); Jaén 5–0 Melilla (6 December 2015); Cádiz 5–0 Jumilla (12 December 2015); La Hoya Lorca 6–1 Melilla (31 January 2016)
- Biggest away win: Atlético Baleares 0–6 Lleida Esportiu (3 April 2016)
- Highest scoring: Espanyol B 4–5 Eldense (17 October 2015); Castilla 6–3 Guadalajara (3 April 2016)
- Highest attendance: 26,000; Hércules 0–1 Cádiz (26 June 2016)

The 2015–16 Segunda División B season was the 39th since its establishment. The first matches of the season were to be played in August 2015, and the season ended in June 2016 with the promotion play-off finals.

== Overview before the season ==
80 teams will join the league, including four relegated from the 2014–15 Segunda División and 18 promoted from the 2014–15 Tercera División.

Relegated from Segunda División

- Racing Santander
- Recreativo
- Sabadell
- Barcelona B

Promoted from Tercera División

- Algeciras
- Arandina
- Arenas Getxo
- Atlético Levante
- Ebro
- Gernika
- Izarra
- Jumilla
- Linares
- Llosetense
- Mensajero
- Mérida
- Pobla de Mafumet
- Peña Sport
- Pontevedra
- Portugalete
- Rayo Majadahonda
- Talavera de la Reina

== Groups ==
=== Group 1 ===
==== Stadia and locations ====
Location of teams in 2015–16 Segunda División B Group 1

Team	Home city	Stadium	Capacity
Arandina	Aranda de Duero	El Montecillo	6,000
Atlético Astorga	Astorga	La Eragudina	2,000
Burgos	Burgos	El Plantío	14,000
Cacereño	Cáceres	Príncipe Felipe	7,000
Celta B	Vigo	Barreiro	4,500
Compostela	Santiago	San Lázaro	14,000
Coruxo	Coruxo, Vigo	O Vao	1,200
Cultural Leonesa	León	Reino de León	13,451
Guijuelo	Guijuelo	Estadio Municipal	1,500
Izarra	Estella-Lizarra	Merkatondoa	3,500
Lealtad	Villaviciosa	Les Caleyes	3,000
Peña Sport	Tafalla	San Francisco	3,000
Pontevedra	Pontevedra	Pasarón	12,000
Racing Ferrol	Ferrol	A Malata	12,042
Racing Santander	Santander	El Sardinero	22,222
Somozas	As Somozas	Pardiñas	1,000
Sporting B	Gijón	Pepe Ortiz	3,000
Tudelano	Tudela	Ciudad de Tudela	11,000
UD Logroñés	Logroño	Las Gaunas	16,000
Valladolid B	Valladolid	Anexos José Zorrilla	1,500

==== League table ====
Pos	Team	Pld	W	D	L	GF	GA	GD	Pts	Qualification or relegation
1	Racing Santander	38	21	11	6	56	28	+28	74	Qualification to group champions' playoffs
2	Racing Ferrol	38	21	10	7	60	28	+32	73	Qualification to promotion playoffs
3	Tudelano	38	20	12	6	48	23	+25	72	Qualification to promotion playoffs
4	UD Logroñés	38	18	12	8	50	28	+22	66	Qualification to promotion playoffs
5	Burgos	38	15	13	10	47	39	+8	58	Qualification for the Copa del Rey
6	Guijuelo	38	17	6	15	35	35	0	57	Qualification for the Copa del Rey
7	Cultural Leonesa	38	14	14	10	39	32	+7	56	Qualification for the Copa del Rey
8	Somozas	38	15	10	13	41	38	+3	55	
9	Pontevedra	38	14	12	12	38	37	+1	54	
10	Lealtad	38	14	8	16	50	44	+6	50	
11	Celta Vigo B	38	14	8	16	47	55	−8	50	
12	Izarra	38	13	11	14	35	37	−2	50	
13	Valladolid B	38	13	9	16	42	49	−7	48	
14	Coruxo	38	13	7	18	49	51	−2	46	
15	Arandina	38	12	9	17	43	61	−18	45	
16	Cacereño (R)	38	11	10	17	33	45	−12	43	Qualification to relegation playoffs
17	Sporting Gijón B (R)	38	12	6	20	34	52	−18	42	Relegation to Tercera División
18	Atlético Astorga (R)	38	10	10	18	44	55	−11	40	Relegation to Tercera División
19	Compostela (R)	38	9	11	18	29	42	−13	38	Relegation to Tercera División
20	Peña Sport (R)	38	7	5	26	29	70	−41	26	Relegation to Tercera División

Source: Futbolme.com
Rules for classification: 1) points; 2) head-to-head points; 3) head-to-head goal difference; 4) head-to-head goals scored; 5) goal difference; 6) number of goals scored
(R) Relegated

==== Results ====
Home \ Away	ARA	AST	BUR	CAC	CEL	COM	COR	CUL	GUI	IZA	LEA	PSP	PON	RFE	RSA	SOM	SPO	TUD	LOG	VAD
Arandina	—	2–0	2–2	1–3	2–1	1–2	1–1	0–1	0–1	1–1	2–1	2–1	2–3	1–0	1–1	0–1	3–1	0–3	0–0	3–2
Atlético Astorga	1–2	—	0–1	5–3	4–0	1–1	2–3	0–2	2–0	0–0	1–1	2–0	0–0	2–1	1–1	1–1	0–1	1–5	3–1	0–1
Burgos	3–1	3–2	—	1–0	3–1	1–1	1–3	2–3	2–0	2–1	1–1	1–0	1–1	2–0	0–1	3–3	2–1	0–2	2–3	0–0
Cacereño	0–0	1–1	1–0	—	4–2	0–0	1–0	0–1	0–1	1–2	1–0	3–0	1–0	0–2	3–0	0–2	0–1	2–0	0–0	0–0
Celta Vigo B	6–1	0–1	0–1	0–0	—	1–0	2–2	1–1	1–0	5–1	1–3	1–0	1–1	0–1	1–0	0–0	1–0	0–1	0–3	4–2
Compostela	0–1	4–1	0–0	3–1	2–1	—	1–2	0–0	0–1	2–0	1–1	1–0	3–0	0–2	1–2	0–1	0–2	2–1	0–2	0–1
Coruxo	4–1	3–1	0–2	0–1	1–3	5–1	—	1–2	5–0	0–0	2–1	2–1	0–1	0–0	1–0	1–4	4–0	1–2	0–1	2–0
Cultural Leonesa	2–0	0–0	1–0	1–0	0–0	1–1	0–1	—	0–2	3–1	2–1	2–0	0–0	2–2	2–0	0–0	1–0	0–0	0–2	1–2
Guijuelo	2–0	2–1	1–0	0–0	4–1	1–1	3–1	3–1	—	1–0	1–0	3–0	0–1	0–1	1–2	2–0	0–2	0–2	1–1	1–4
Izarra	2–0	2–0	1–0	1–2	0–1	1–0	0–0	0–0	1–0	—	1–1	2–0	1–0	0–0	0–0	0–1	3–0	1–0	1–0	0–0
Lealtad	1–3	1–0	0–0	3–0	2–0	3–1	2–0	3–1	0–1	2–1	—	3–0	1–0	1–1	0–1	0–1	1–0	0–1	0–2	5–1
Peña Sport	1–1	2–4	1–2	0–0	0–2	1–0	1–0	0–5	0–2	2–1	2–1	—	1–2	1–4	3–3	3–1	1–2	0–0	1–3	2–0
Pontevedra	1–0	2–1	1–1	0–0	1–2	0–0	3–1	2–1	0–1	3–1	2–2	1–0	—	0–3	1–1	2–0	1–1	2–0	0–1	1–2
Racing Ferrol	3–0	0–1	3–2	4–1	6–2	0–1	1–1	0–0	1–0	1–1	3–1	3–0	1–0	—	2–2	2–0	2–0	0–0	2–1	2–1
Racing Santander	0–0	2–1	1–1	4–0	4–0	1–0	1–0	2–0	1–0	3–0	2–0	3–0	1–2	3–1	—	2–0	2–1	0–0	0–1	3–1
Somozas	2–1	1–1	0–1	3–1	1–3	0–0	3–1	2–1	0–0	0–0	3–4	0–1	1–1	0–1	0–0	—	2–1	0–1	0–1	3–0
Sporting Gijón B	2–3	0–1	2–3	2–1	0–2	0–0	2–1	0–0	3–0	2–6	1–0	3–2	0–0	0–2	0–2	0–1	—	1–1	2–1	0–2
Tudelano	2–2	2–0	0–0	1–0	2–0	1–0	3–0	3–1	0–0	2–1	2–0	1–1	1–0	0–0	1–2	2–1	1–0	—	0–0	2–1
UD Logroñés	1–2	1–1	0–0	1–1	1–1	3–0	3–0	1–1	1–0	2–0	1–3	3–1	3–0	2–1	1–1	0–1	0–0	1–1	—	1–2
Valladolid B	3–1	3–1	1–1	3–1	0–0	2–0	0–0	0–0	0–0	0–1	1–1	1–0	1–3	0–2	1–2	1–2	0–1	3–2	0–1	—

Legend: Blue = home team win; Yellow = draw; Red = away team win.

==== Top goalscorers ====
Last updated 15 May 2016

Goalscorers	Goals	Team
(Spain) Joselu	20	Racing Ferrol
(Spain) Pere Milla	18	UD Logroñés
(Spain) David Bandera	16	Atlético Astorga
(Spain) Dioni Villalba	13	Racing Santander
(Spain) Isaac Aketxe	12	Cultural Leonesa

==== Top goalkeepers ====
Last updated 15 May 2016

Goalkeeper	Goals	Matches	Average	Team
(Spain) Mikel Pagola	23	38	0.61	Tudelano
(Spain) Miguel Martínez	22	34	0.65	UD Logroñés
(Spain) Javier Mandaluniz	26	33	0.79	Somozas
(Spain) Ian Mackay	28	34	0.82	Racing Ferrol
(Spain) Kike Royo	31	36	0.86	Guijuelo

=== Group 2 ===
==== Stadia and locations ====
Location of teams in 2015–16 Segunda División B Group 2
Location of Segunda División B in the Canary Islands – Group 2 teams 2015–16

Team	Home city	Stadium	Capacity
Amorebieta	Amorebieta-Etxano	Urritxe	3,000
Arenas	Getxo	Gobela	1,200
Barakaldo	Barakaldo	Lasesarre	7,960
Ebro	Zaragoza	El Carmen	1,200
Fuenlabrada	Fuenlabrada	Fernando Torres	2,500
Gernika	Gernika	Urbieta	3,000
Getafe B	Getafe	Ciudad Deportiva	1,500
Guadalajara	Guadalajara	Pedro Escartín	8,000
La Roda	La Roda	Estadio Municipal	3,000
Leioa	Leioa	Sarriena	3,500
Mensajero	Santa Cruz de La Palma	Silvestre Carrillo	5,000
Portugalete	Portugalete	La Florida	3,000
Rayo Majadahonda	Majadahonda	Cerro del Espino	3,376
Real Madrid Castilla	Madrid	Alfredo di Stéfano	6,000
Real Sociedad B	San Sebastián	Zubieta	2,500
Real Unión	Irun	Stadium Gal	6,344
Sestao River	Sestao	Las Llanas	8,905
Socuéllamos	Socuéllamos	Paquito Jiménez	2,000
Talavera de la Reina	Talavera de la Reina	El Prado	5,000
Toledo	Toledo	Salto del Caballo	5,300

==== League table ====
Pos	Team	Pld	W	D	L	GF	GA	GD	Pts	Qualification or relegation
1	Real Madrid Castilla	38	24	8	6	72	40	+32	80	Qualification to group champions' playoffs and Ineligible for the Copa del Rey
2	Barakaldo	38	24	8	6	52	24	+28	80	Qualification to promotion playoffs
3	Socuéllamos	38	19	7	12	51	43	+8	64	Qualification to promotion playoffs
4	Toledo	38	18	9	11	49	33	+16	63	Qualification to promotion playoffs
5	Real Unión	38	17	9	12	59	37	+22	60	Qualification for the Copa del Rey
6	Sestao River	38	15	15	8	38	29	+9	60	Qualification for the Copa del Rey
7	Real Sociedad B	38	16	12	10	58	44	+14	60	Ineligible for the Copa del Rey
8	Arenas	38	15	12	11	50	43	+7	57	Qualification for the Copa del Rey
9	Amorebieta	38	15	11	12	50	43	+7	56	Qualification for the Copa del Rey
10	Ebro	38	13	14	11	43	37	+6	53	
11	Fuenlabrada	38	12	13	13	40	40	0	49	
12	Gernika	38	10	15	13	41	49	−8	45	
13	Mensajero	38	12	8	18	37	47	−10	44	
14	Rayo Majadahonda	38	11	10	17	42	50	−8	43	
15	La Roda	38	12	7	19	40	52	−12	43	
16	Leioa (O)	38	11	8	19	37	59	−22	41	Qualification to relegation playoffs
17	Guadalajara (R)	38	10	10	18	40	56	−16	40	Relegation to Tercera División
18	Talavera de la Reina (R)	38	9	10	19	42	59	−17	37	Relegation to Tercera División
19	Portugalete (R)	38	6	14	18	29	48	−19	32	Relegation to Tercera División
20	Getafe B (R)	38	10	2	26	43	80	−37	32	Relegation to Tercera División

Source: Futbolme.com
Rules for classification: 1) points; 2) head-to-head points; 3) head-to-head goal difference; 4) head-to-head goals scored; 5) goal difference; 6) number of goals scored
(O) Play-off winners; (R) Relegated

==== Results ====
Home \ Away	AMO	ARE	BAR	EBR	FUE	GER	GET	GUA	ROD	LEI	MEN	POR	RAY	RMC	RSO	RUN	SES	SOC	TAL	TOL
Amorebieta	—	1–1	0–2	0–1	1–1	1–0	2–0	4–0	3–2	0–1	1–0	0–0	2–1	1–4	3–3	2–2	1–0	2–1	3–0	1–1
Arenas	0–1	—	1–1	2–0	1–0	1–0	4–1	2–1	0–0	5–0	1–0	1–1	2–1	2–1	2–2	1–3	3–3	1–2	2–0	2–1
Barakaldo	1–1	0–1	—	1–0	1–0	4–0	3–0	3–2	4–1	1–0	1–0	1–0	1–0	0–1	2–1	3–2	3–1	1–0	1–0	2–1
Ebro	0–2	3–3	0–1	—	3–3	0–2	1–0	2–0	1–0	5–0	2–2	2–1	2–1	0–1	1–0	1–1	0–0	0–0	3–0	2–2
Fuenlabrada	2–1	1–0	1–1	0–0	—	1–0	2–0	1–0	2–1	0–2	0–0	0–0	0–2	2–1	0–0	2–2	3–1	1–1	1–1	0–1
Gernika	0–2	1–0	1–0	0–0	3–1	—	3–2	0–0	2–0	1–1	3–1	4–1	2–2	1–1	1–1	0–5	0–0	0–1	3–3	2–0
Getafe B	4–2	3–2	3–1	0–1	0–3	0–1	—	1–2	0–1	3–1	3–0	0–2	1–3	2–0	0–2	0–3	1–2	2–1	1–1	1–4
Guadalajara	2–0	0–1	0–1	1–1	1–3	2–2	0–0	—	1–1	1–1	1–0	2–1	4–0	1–2	2–2	0–1	0–1	1–0	0–1	1–1
La Roda	0–2	0–1	1–0	0–2	0–1	1–1	3–0	0–1	—	1–0	2–0	1–0	1–1	2–2	4–1	2–1	0–0	1–3	2–0	0–2
Leioa	1–3	1–1	0–1	2–0	0–0	2–2	2–0	2–3	1–0	—	3–1	1–1	0–3	1–1	0–4	0–2	0–2	2–1	3–1	0–3
Mensajero	0–0	1–0	0–1	1–1	2–0	2–0	5–0	1–0	1–1	1–0	—	2–0	0–0	1–2	0–5	2–1	0–0	1–2	3–0	1–0
Portugalete	3–2	1–1	0–0	1–0	1–1	0–0	3–1	0–2	1–3	0–0	1–1	—	0–0	0–0	0–1	1–0	1–2	0–1	1–0	0–0
Rayo Majadahonda	1–1	4–2	0–0	0–0	0–1	2–2	2–4	2–3	1–0	2–3	2–1	2–1	—	1–2	0–2	1–0	1–0	0–1	1–2	0–1
Real Madrid Castilla	1–1	1–0	0–0	5–1	3–2	3–0	2–1	6–3	6–1	2–1	1–0	1–0	4–0	—	2–1	1–0	3–1	3–1	1–1	1–2
Real Sociedad B	1–0	0–0	1–0	1–1	2–1	2–1	4–1	1–1	2–0	2–1	4–0	3–2	0–0	1–2	—	0–3	1–1	1–2	3–1	0–0
Real Unión	0–0	2–0	1–1	2–1	2–1	1–1	0–2	3–0	5–1	0–1	2–3	3–2	1–0	1–0	3–1	—	2–2	0–0	2–0	1–1
Sestao River	0–0	1–1	0–1	1–1	1–0	2–0	4–0	1–0	1–0	1–0	2–1	1–1	1–0	1–1	1–1	1–0	—	0–0	0–0	1–1
Socuéllamos	2–2	0–0	2–4	0–2	3–2	1–4	0–4	2–1	4–2	2–1	2–0	3–0	1–2	4–0	1–2	1–0	1–0	—	1–0	1–0
Talavera de la Reina	1–0	2–3	2–2	1–0	2–1	0–0	5–1	5–0	0–3	1–2	3–2	0–0	2–2	3–4	3–0	0–1	0–1	0–0	—	0–4
Toledo	0–1	3–0	0–2	2–1	0–0	1–0	3–1	1–1	1–0	2–1	0–1	3–1	0–2	0–1	2–0	2–1	1–0	1–3	2–1	—

Legend: Blue = home team win; Yellow = draw; Red = away team win.

==== Top goalscorers ====
Last updated 15 May 2016

Goalscorers	Goals	Team
(Dominican Republic) Mariano Díaz	25	Real Madrid Castilla
(Spain) Christian Perales	18	Talavera de la Reina
(Spain) Borja Mayoral	15	Real Madrid Castilla
(Spain) Eduardo Ubis	15	Amorebieta
(Spain) Javi Gómez	14	Socuéllamos

==== Top goalkeepers ====
Last updated 15 May 2016

Goalkeeper	Goals	Matches	Average	Team
(Spain) Raúl Domínguez	23	34	0.68	Sestao
(Spain) Alejandro García	21	29	0.72	Barakaldo
(Spain) Carlos Abad	34	36	0.94	Real Madrid Castilla
(Spain) Txusta	34	36	0.94	Real Unión
(Spain) Javier Montoya	32	33	0.97	Ebro

=== Group 3 ===
==== Stadia and locations ====
Location of teams in 2015–16 Segunda División B Group 3

Team	Home city	Stadium	Capacity
Alcoyano	Alcoy	El Collao	4,880
Atlético Baleares	Palma	Son Malferit	1,000
Atlético Levante	Valencia	Ciudad Deportiva	3,000
Badalona	Badalona	Montigalà	1,500
Barcelona B	Barcelona	Mini Estadi	15,276
Cornellà	Cornellà de Llobregat	Nou Camp	1,500
Eldense	Elda	Nuevo Pepico Amat	4,036
Espanyol B	Sant Adrià de Besòs	Dani Jarque	6,000
Hércules	Alicante	José Rico Pérez	30,000
Huracán Valencia	Torrent	San Gregorio	3,500
L'Hospitalet	L'Hospitalet de Llobregat	La Feixa Llarga	6,740
Lleida Esportiu	Lleida	Camp d'Esports	13,000
Llosetense	Lloseta	Municipal	2,000
Olímpic	Xàtiva	La Murta	3,600
Olot	Olot	Municipal	2,000
Pobla de Mafumet	La Pobla de Mafumet	Municipal	1,000
Reus Deportiu	Reus	Municipal	4,700
Sabadell	Sabadell	Nova Creu Alta	11,981
Valencia Mestalla	Valencia	Antonio Puchades	3,000
Villarreal B	Villarreal	Ciudad Deportiva	5,000

==== League table ====
Pos	Team	Pld	W	D	L	GF	GA	GD	Pts	Qualification or relegation
1	Reus Deportiu (P)	38	21	10	7	52	31	+21	73	Qualification to group champions' playoffs
2	Villarreal B	38	20	11	7	62	32	+30	71	Qualification to promotion playoffs and ineligible for the Copa del Rey
3	Hércules	38	19	14	5	51	28	+23	71	Qualification to promotion playoffs
4	Lleida Esportiu	38	18	13	7	49	22	+27	67	Qualification to promotion playoffs
5	Cornellà	38	18	9	11	46	36	+10	63	Qualification for the Copa del Rey
6	Alcoyano	38	17	10	11	47	34	+13	61	Qualification for the Copa del Rey
7	Sabadell	38	15	10	13	49	40	+9	55	
8	Valencia Mestalla	38	15	8	15	45	39	+6	53	
9	Atlético Baleares	38	14	11	13	48	47	+1	53	
10	Eldense	38	14	9	15	48	63	−15	51	
11	Barcelona B	38	14	9	15	40	40	0	51	
12	Espanyol B	38	12	12	14	50	45	+5	48	
13	Badalona	38	10	16	12	32	39	−7	46	
14	Atlético Levante	38	11	12	15	38	48	−10	45	
15	L'Hospitalet	38	11	10	17	31	49	−18	43	
16	Olímpic (R)	38	11	9	18	29	46	−17	42	Qualification to relegation playoffs
17	Pobla de Mafumet (R)	38	7	17	14	34	47	−13	38	Relegation to Tercera División
18	Olot (R)	38	7	16	15	37	53	−16	37	Relegation to Tercera División
19	Llosetense (R)	38	9	8	21	26	54	−28	35	Relegation to Tercera División
20	Huracán Valencia (Note: Huracán Valencia expelled from the competition due to not paying referees.) (D)	38	5	10	23	17	38	−21	0	Club folded

Source: Futbolme.com
Rules for classification: 1) points; 2) head-to-head points; 3) head-to-head goal difference; 4) head-to-head goals scored; 5) goal difference; 6) number of goals scored
(D) Disqualified; (P) Promoted; (R) Relegated

==== Results ====
Home \ Away	ALC	ATB	LEV	BAD	FCB	COR	ELD	ESP	HER	HUR	HOS	LLE	LLO	OLI	OLO	POB	REU	SAB	VAL	VIL
Alcoyano	—	0–0	2–0	0–1	3–3	3–1	1–0	3–1	0–0	0–0	3–0	0–0	2–1	2–0	2–2	2–1	3–0	3–0	2–1	2–0
Atlético Baleares	2–1	—	3–0	3–1	3–0	1–2	2–1	3–1	2–2	1–0	1–1	0–6	0–1	2–1	1–1	1–0	0–0	3–3	0–2	1–1
Atlético Levante	2–1	0–0	—	1–2	0–0	1–1	2–2	1–1	0–1	1–0	1–1	0–1	2–0	2–2	3–0	2–2	1–1	1–0	1–0	2–4
Badalona	2–0	3–0	0–1	—	1–1	0–2	1–1	1–0	0–0	1–0	1–2	0–2	0–0	2–0	0–0	0–0	1–1	0–0	2–2	1–0
Barcelona B	1–0	1–2	2–0	0–1	—	1–1	1–0	1–0	0–0	1–1	1–3	1–0	0–1	0–1	2–0	0–0	1–2	1–3	1–2	1–0
Cornellà	1–0	2–1	0–1	1–1	2–1	—	0–1	2–0	1–1	1–0	0–1	0–2	2–0	1–0	5–0	0–0	0–1	3–2	3–2	2–0
Eldense	2–1	1–0	0–2	1–1	4–2	2–2	—	2–1	1–1	1–0	0–1	0–0	2–1	1–0	2–1	2–1	0–4	2–2	0–2	2–1
Espanyol B	1–0	1–3	1–1	2–2	3–2	4–0	4–5	—	0–1	1–0	4–0	1–0	3–0	4–0	1–1	1–0	2–0	1–0	1–1	1–1
Hércules	0–2	1–0	1–0	2–0	0–2	0–0	4–0	3–2	—	4–0	2–0	2–1	2–2	1–1	1–0	1–1	1–2	2–1	1–0	0–4
Huracán Valencia (Note: After being expelled from the competition, all games of Huracán Valencia since round 19 finished 0–1 by following the competition rules.)	0–1	1–1	1–0	3–2	0–3	1–1	0–2	0–0	0–1	—	0–1	0–1	0–1	0–1	3–1	0–1	1–2	0–1	1–1	0–1
L'Hospitalet	0–0	3–1	1–1	1–0	0–1	0–1	3–2	1–1	0–4	0–0	—	0–0	0–1	0–1	0–0	1–2	1–1	1–1	0–2	1–3
Lleida Esportiu	0–0	2–1	4–0	2–0	2–0	2–0	3–0	1–0	0–0	0–0	2–0	—	5–0	1–0	2–0	1–1	0–3	0–0	2–1	0–1
Llosetense	1–2	1–0	3–1	0–0	0–2	1–2	1–1	0–0	0–2	1–2	0–1	0–0	—	0–1	1–0	0–2	2–1	2–3	1–1	1–0
Olímpic	3–1	1–2	2–0	0–1	1–0	0–3	1–1	1–1	0–2	0–0	2–1	2–1	1–1	—	2–2	2–1	1–1	0–2	0–1	0–0
Olot	1–2	1–1	1–2	1–1	0–1	2–0	5–0	2–1	0–0	1–0	0–3	1–1	3–1	3–1	—	1–1	0–0	1–1	2–0	1–1
Pobla de Mafumet	0–0	0–3	3–2	1–1	0–2	0–0	2–1	1–1	1–1	1–2	0–1	2–2	2–1	1–0	2–2	—	1–1	1–1	0–4	1–2
Reus Deportiu	3–0	1–0	2–1	3–1	1–0	1–2	1–0	3–1	0–3	1–0	2–0	0–0	3–0	1–0	3–0	3–2	—	1–0	1–0	0–0
Sabadell	2–0	2–1	0–0	1–1	2–2	0–1	4–1	0–1	1–2	1–0	3–0	1–2	2–0	1–0	3–0	1–0	3–1	—	0–2	1–0
Valencia Mestalla	1–2	1–2	1–2	2–0	0–3	1–0	2–3	1–0	1–1	1–1	2–1	0–0	2–0	0–1	0–0	0–0	2–0	2–1	—	0–1
Villarreal B	1–0	1–1	2–1	3–0	1–1	2–1	3–2	2–2	3–1	1–0	2–0	5–1	2–0	3–0	2–0	2–0	1–1	2–0	4–2	—

Legend: Blue = home team win; Yellow = draw; Red = away team win.

==== Top goalscorers ====
Last updated 15 May 2016

Goalscorers	Goals	Team
(Spain) Fran Sol	16	Villarreal B
(Spain) Carlos Martínez	15	Villarreal B
(Spain) Carlitos López	13	Villarreal B
(Spain) Edgar Hernández	12	Reus Deportiu
(Spain) Rubén Jurado	12	Atlético Baleares

==== Top goalkeepers ====
Last updated 15 May 2016

Goalkeeper	Goals	Matches	Average	Team
(Spain) Iván Crespo	20	36	0.56	Lleida Esportiu
(Spain) Chema Giménez	21	32	0.66	Hércules
(Spain) Edgar Badia	31	37	0.84	Reus Deportiu
(Spain) Aitor Fernández	32	37	0.86	Villarreal B
(Spain) Marc Martínez	29	32	0.91	Alcoyano

=== Group 4 ===
==== Stadia and locations ====
Location of teams in 2015–16 Segunda División B Group 4

Team	Home city	Stadium	Capacity
Algeciras	Algeciras	Nuevo Mirador	7,200
Almería B	Almería	Juan Rojas	13,468
Betis B	Seville	Luis del Sol	4,000
Cádiz	Cádiz	Ramón de Carranza	25,033
Cartagena	Cartagena	Cartagonova	15,105
Granada B	Granada	Miguel Prieto	2,500
Jaén	Jaén	La Victoria	12,800
Jumilla	Jumilla	La Hoya	3,000
La Hoya Lorca	Lorca	Artés Carrasco	8,120
Linares	Linares	Linarejos	10,000
Linense	La Línea de la Concepción	Municipal	12,000
Marbella	Marbella	Municipal	8,000
Melilla	Melilla	Álvarez Claro	12,000
Mérida	Mérida	Romano	14,600
Murcia	Murcia	Nueva Condomina	31,179
Recreativo	Huelva	Nuevo Colombino	21,670
San Roque de Lepe	Lepe	Ciudad de Lepe	3,500
Sevilla Atlético	Seville	José Ramón Cisneros	7,500
UCAM Murcia	Murcia	La Condomina	16,000
Villanovense	Villanueva de la Serena	Romero Cuerda	6,000

==== League table ====
Pos	Team	Pld	W	D	L	GF	GA	GD	Pts	Qualification or relegation
1	UCAM Murcia (C, P)	38	22	11	5	46	17	+29	77	Qualification to group champions' playoffs
2	Murcia	38	21	8	9	56	30	+26	71	Qualification to promotion playoffs
3	Sevilla Atlético (P)	38	17	17	4	53	31	+22	68	Qualification to promotion playoffs and Ineligible for the Copa del Rey
4	Cádiz (P)	38	17	12	9	53	31	+22	63	Qualification to promotion playoffs
5	Granada B	38	15	13	10	56	40	+16	58	Ineligible for the Copa del Rey
6	La Hoya Lorca	38	14	14	10	43	41	+2	56	Qualification for the Copa del Rey
7	Cartagena	38	12	17	9	40	35	+5	53	Qualification for the Copa del Rey
8	Mérida	38	12	16	10	39	41	−2	52	
9	Melilla	38	12	13	13	34	44	−10	49	
10	Jaén	38	14	6	18	46	37	+9	48	
11	Linense	38	13	9	16	47	51	−4	48	
12	Villanovense	38	13	8	17	49	56	−7	47	
13	Recreativo	38	11	12	15	27	38	−11	45	
14	Marbella	38	9	18	11	46	47	−1	45	
15	Jumilla	38	11	10	17	36	57	−21	43	
16	Linares (O)	38	9	16	13	39	46	−7	43	Qualification to relegation playoffs
17	Betis B (R)	38	10	11	17	47	53	−6	41	Relegation to Tercera División
18	Algeciras (R)	38	11	8	19	28	48	−20	41	Relegation to Tercera División
19	San Roque de Lepe (R)	38	6	21	11	42	55	−13	39	Relegation to Tercera División
20	Almería B (R)	38	6	10	22	26	55	−29	28	Relegation to Tercera División

Source: Futbolme.com
Rules for classification: 1) points; 2) head-to-head points; 3) head-to-head goal difference; 4) head-to-head goals scored; 5) goal difference; 6) number of goals scored
(C) Champions; (O) Play-off winners; (P) Promoted; (R) Relegated

==== Results ====
Home \ Away	ALG	ALM	BET	CAD	CAR	GRA	JAE	JUM	HOY	LNR	LNS	MAR	MEL	MER	MUR	REC	SRO	SEV	UCM	VIL
Algeciras	—	0–0	0–4	1–0	1–1	2–1	1–3	1–0	2–1	1–1	1–0	1–0	1–0	1–2	1–2	0–1	0–1	0–1	1–0	0–2
Almería B	0–0	—	0–1	2–1	0–0	2–1	0–3	3–1	0–1	2–3	0–2	3–2	1–1	1–1	0–3	1–0	1–1	0–4	0–2	1–3
Betis B	0–0	3–1	—	3–2	0–0	1–0	2–4	4–3	0–2	1–3	4–1	1–2	0–0	0–1	0–0	0–1	1–1	2–2	0–1	4–1
Cádiz	3–0	1–0	0–0	—	4–2	0–1	2–0	5–0	1–1	3–1	1–0	3–0	3–0	0–1	0–1	2–1	1–1	1–1	0–2	3–0
Cartagena	1–1	2–0	2–1	0–1	—	0–0	1–0	2–0	2–0	0–1	1–1	2–1	1–1	3–1	2–1	1–0	1–1	0–2	0–0	2–0
Granada B	2–0	2–2	2–2	1–1	1–3	—	1–0	3–0	2–0	2–2	2–1	3–1	4–0	1–1	1–2	1–0	3–3	2–0	1–1	2–2
Jaén	3–1	0–0	3–1	0–1	0–0	0–1	—	3–0	0–0	3–0	2–0	0–1	5–0	0–1	0–0	2–0	2–3	1–1	0–1	0–2
Jumilla	3–2	0–0	1–0	0–0	0–0	1–0	2–0	—	1–1	2–2	2–1	0–4	1–0	1–1	1–2	1–1	3–1	0–0	1–2	2–1
La Hoya Lorca	1–1	1–0	1–0	1–1	1–1	1–1	3–1	3–2	—	2–0	0–1	1–3	6–1	3–1	1–0	2–1	1–1	0–0	0–1	0–5
Linares	2–1	1–0	4–1	0–1	0–0	1–4	1–0	0–1	0–0	—	2–2	0–0	0–0	1–1	0–1	2–0	4–0	1–1	0–3	1–2
Linense	0–0	2–1	2–0	2–1	3–1	0–1	0–1	3–1	4–0	3–3	—	0–2	2–1	1–0	0–2	2–3	1–0	0–3	0–0	2–0
Marbella	0–0	0–1	4–4	1–1	2–2	0–0	0–1	3–1	1–1	1–0	2–2	—	1–1	1–1	3–1	1–2	1–1	1–1	1–1	1–1
Melilla	1–2	1–0	1–0	0–1	1–0	0–2	1–0	1–0	0–0	0–0	1–0	2–0	—	2–0	1–1	3–0	1–1	1–1	0–1	4–1
Mérida	0–2	3–3	0–1	1–1	2–1	2–1	2–1	0–0	0–2	1–1	1–1	0–1	1–3	—	0–2	4–0	3–2	0–0	0–0	2–2
Murcia	3–1	1–0	3–1	1–2	2–0	3–4	2–0	3–0	2–1	0–0	2–1	0–0	2–0	1–1	—	0–1	4–1	0–1	0–1	1–1
Recreativo	0–1	1–0	0–0	0–0	1–1	1–0	2–2	0–1	1–1	0–0	2–2	2–0	0–1	0–0	0–0	—	1–1	0–2	1–0	2–1
San Roque de Lepe	2–0	2–0	2–2	1–3	1–1	1–1	1–4	2–1	0–1	0–0	2–2	0–0	0–1	0–0	2–4	1–1	—	2–0	0–0	1–1
Sevilla Atlético	2–1	2–1	1–0	1–1	1–1	1–1	2–0	2–1	3–0	3–2	2–0	1–1	2–2	1–2	1–0	0–1	1–1	—	1–0	3–2
UCAM Murcia	3–0	2–0	1–0	2–0	2–1	2–1	1–0	1–1	1–1	3–0	3–1	2–0	0–0	0–1	1–2	1–0	2–2	0–0	—	2–1
Villanovense	1–0	1–0	1–3	2–2	1–2	1–0	0–2	0–1	0–2	1–0	1–1	4–2	2–1	0–1	0–2	1–0	2–0	3–3	0–1	—

Legend: Blue = home team win; Yellow = draw; Red = away team win.

==== Top goalscorers ====
Last updated 15 May 2016

Goalscorers	Goals	Team
(Spain) Pedro Conde	17	Mérida
(Spain) Carlos Fernández	16	Sevilla Atlético
(Spain) Juanfran Guarnido	14	Villanovense
(Spain) Loren Morón	13	Betis B
(Spain) Dani Güiza	12	Cádiz

==== Top goalkeepers ====
Last updated 15 May 2016

Goalkeeper	Goals	Matches	Average	Team
(Spain) Fernando Martínez	28	37	0.76	Murcia
(Spain) Alberto Cifuentes	30	36	0.83	Cádiz
(Spain) Limones	33	37	0.89	Cartagena
(Spain) Felipe Ramos	28	31	0.9	Jaén
(Spain) José Antonio Caro	30	33	0.91	Sevilla Atlético

== Attendance data ==
This is a list of attendance data of the teams that give an official number. It includes playoffs games:

Pos	Team	Total	High	Low	Average	Change
1	Cádiz	205,179	17,388	6,500	9,326	n/a
2	Racing Santander	133,092	17,926	3,000	6,655	−25.4%^{1}
3	Murcia	109,676	18,003	3,259	5,484	−19.5%
4	Cartagena	91,027	10,327	2,711	4,791	n/a
5	Mérida	70,830	7,389	2,084	3,728	n/a
6	UD Logroñés	67,821	8,314	1,503	3,230	+14.7%
7	Real Madrid Castilla	46,918	5,270	960	2,234	n/a
8	Sabadell	38,254	3,048	1,631	2,125	−46.1%^{1}
9	UCAM Murcia	43,855	5,400	1,315	2,085	n/a
10	Cultural Leonesa	35,701	2,531	1,419	1,879	n/a
11	Barcelona B	28,758	2,437	681	1,514	−60.3%^{1}
12	Olot	24,238	1,920	964	1,347	−3.2%
13	Atlético Baleares	17,071	1,500	678	948	n/a
14	Compostela	17,132	1,737	526	902	n/a

Notes:
1: Team played last season in Segunda División.

== See also ==
- 2015–16 La Liga
- 2015–16 Segunda División
- 2015–16 Tercera División
- 2015–16 Copa del Rey
