= Víctor Sanchís =

Spanish footballer

Personal information
- Full name: Víctor Sanchís García
- Date of birth: 23 March 2001 (age 25)
- Place of birth: Barcelona, Spain
- Height: 1.85 m (6 ft 1 in)
- Position: Right back

Team information
- Current team: Utebo
- Number: 15

Youth career
- Espanyol
- 2010–2014: Damm
- 2014–2020: Espanyol

Senior career*
Years	Team	Apps	(Gls)
2020–2021	Ourense	31	(2)
2021–2022	Mirandés B	28	(3)
2021–2022	Mirandés	1	(0)
2022–2024	Teruel	57	(2)
2024–2025	Terrassa	31	(0)
2025–	Utebo	31	(1)
- * Club domestic league appearances and goals as of 7 May 2026

Víctor Sanchís García (born 23 March 2001) is a Spanish footballer who plays for Segunda Federación club Utebo. Mainly a right back, he can also play as a central defender.

== Club career ==
Born in Barcelona, Catalonia, Sanchís represented RCD Espanyol and CF Damm as a youth. On 12 September 2020, after finishing his formation, he signed for Tercera División side Ourense CF.

Sanchís made his senior debut on 18 October 2020, starting in a 1–2 home loss against CD Ribadumia. He scored his first senior goal on 5 December, netting his team's second in a 3–1 home win over UD Ourense.

On 7 July 2021, Sanchís moved to CD Mirandés and was assigned to the reserves in the Tercera División RFEF. He made his first-team debut on 1 December, starting in a 3–0 away win over CD San Roque de Lepe in the season's Copa del Rey.

Sanchís made his professional debut on 16 December 2021, starting in a 2–1 win at CD Lugo, also in the national cup.
