= Javi Gómez (footballer, born 1982) =

Spanish footballer

Personal information
- Full name: Francisco Javier Gómez Torrijos
- Date of birth: 23 July 1982 (age 44)
- Place of birth: Cuenca, Spain
- Height: 1.81 m (5 ft 11 1/2 in)
- Position: Forward

Team information
- Current team: Mérida

Youth career
- Conquense

Senior career*
Years	Team	Apps	(Gls)
2000–2004	Conquense B		
2001–2003	Conquense	11	(0)
2004–2005	La Roda	34	(20)
2005–2006	Gimnástico Alcázar	33	(7)
2006–2009	Conquense	106	(30)
2009–2010	Ceuta	14	(4)
2010	Eibar	13	(1)
2010–2011	Puertollano	23	(2)
2011–2012	Ontinyent	24	(7)
2012–2013	Villarrobledo	32	(11)
2013–2014	Lucena	36	(18)
2014–2015	UCAM Murcia	37	(7)
2015–2016	Socuéllamos	35	(15)
2016–2017	Toledo	31	(3)
2017–2018	Mérida	31	(5)
Total		460	(130)
- * Club domestic league appearances and goals

Francisco Javier "Javi" Gómez Torrijos (born 23 July 1982) is a retired Spanish footballer who played as a forward.

He never played higher than Segunda División B, where he totalled 310 games and 79 goals across 14 seasons in service of ten clubs. Gómez received international fame for a goal he scored from a long-range overhead kick for Socuéllamos in 2016.

== Football career ==
Gómez was born in Cuenca, Castilla-La Mancha, and began his career at hometown club UB Conquense. He made his debut on 18 February 2001 as a second-half substitute in a 0–1 home loss in the 2000–01 Segunda División B, and had another cameo as they defeated CD Binéfar in a play-off to remain in the division.

In 2004, he left for Tercera División club La Roda CF, and spent the following season at CF Gimnástico Alcázar in the same division, before returning to Conquense, now also in the fourth tier. After a nine-goal season in the league above in 2008–09, he transferred to AD Ceuta on 17 June 2009, signing a one-year deal with the option for a second. Halfway through his first campaign for the Caballa team, he reached an agreement to leave and switched to SD Eibar; the Basques competed for the promotion play-offs.

Gómez spent the next two years at CD Puertollano and Ontinyent CF, respectively. In 2013–14 he scored 18 goals for Lucena CF, including a hat-trick in a 3–2 win over Arroyo CP on 10 November.

After a play-off reaching season with UCAM Murcia CF, Gómez signed for UD Socuéllamos of his native region on 3 July 2015. He received international recognition on 24 April when he scored the only goal of a home game against CD Toledo, through a 30-yard bicycle kick; despite speculation, it was overlooked for the FIFA Puskás Award. He moved to the latter club the following 24 June.
