= Linares Deportivo =

Association football club in Spain

Linares
- Full name: Linares Deportivo, S.A.D.
- Nicknames: Azulillos (Little Blues); Mineros (Miners)
- Founded: 4 August 2009; 17 years ago as Asociación Deportiva Linares
- Stadium: Linarejos
- Capacity: 10,000
- President: Luis Vera
- Head coach: Miguel de la Fuente Morán
- League: Segunda Federación – Group 4
- 2025–26: Segunda Federación – Group 4, 8th of 18
- Website: www.linaresdeportivo.es
Home colours	Away colours

Linares Deportivo (Spanish pronunciation: [liˈnaɾes depoɾˈtiβo]) is a Spanish football team based in Linares, in the autonomous community of Andalusia. Founded in 2009 as a replacement for dissolved CD Linares, it plays in Segunda Federación – Group 4. The team's stadium is Estadio Municipal de Linarejos, with a capacity of 10,000 seats.

== History ==
Linares Deportivo was founded in 2009 under the name of Asociación Deportiva Linares, as a replacement for dissolved CD Linares.

The club first reached the fourth division three years later, despite finishing second in the fifth level. In 2014–15, after winning its group, Linares defeated CD Castellón 3–0 on aggregate to win promotion to Segunda División B.

In doing so, Linares qualified for the first time to the Copa del Rey for the following season. They defeated FC Jumilla 2–1 at home in the first round on 2 September 2015, then lost by the same score at UD Logroñés. On 28 May 2017, the team dropped back to the fourth tier after a 2–1 aggregate loss to Burgos CF in the play-offs.

=== Club background ===
- SG Linarense – (1909–20)
- Linares FC – (1920–29)
- Gimnástica Linarense – (1929–31)
- Linares Deportivo (I) – (1940–46)
- Atlético Linares – (1946–48)
- CD Linares (I) – (1952–64)
- Linares CF – (1961–90)
- CD Linares (II) – (1990–2009)
- Linares Deportivo – (2009–present)

== Identity ==
=== Colors ===
Linares Deportivo, like its predecessors, has always played with a blue shirt, white shorts and blue socks at home. The use of the blue color in the kit comes from linarite, a deep blue tabular crystalline mineral that was first identified in 1822 in the Linares mining district.

=== Badge ===
Linares Deportivo's badge is in the shape of a rhombus cut in half and slightly convex outwards on the sides. It is divided diagonally by a red stripe with the name of the club. In the upper left part, in blue, is the interior of the city's coat of arms, in which the old fortress of Linares is represented. In the lower right part of white, there is a ball, representing the sporting character of the team.

=== Supporters ===
Linares Deportivo's supporters are nicknamed azulillos (blues) or mineros (miners), due to the historical importance of lead mining for the development of the city of Linares.

== Rivalry ==
Linares Deportivo's historic rival is Real Jaén, which currently plays in Tercera Federación. The traditional rivalry between the cities of Jaén and Linares, which manifested itself between Real Jaén and the predecessors of Linares Deportivo, has been inherited by the new club. The historic rivalry between lagartos (lizards) and mineros (miners), nicknames of the teams from Jaén and Linares, respectively, has its origin in 1922. The matches between Real Jaén and Linares Deportivo are usually called "the Jaén classic", because they are played between the two most important and historic teams in the province of the same name. These matches are usually very popular, although also the cause of some brawl at times between fans of both teams.

== Season to season ==
Season	Tier	Division	Place	Copa del Rey
2009–10	7	1ª Prov.	1st	
2010–11	6	Reg. Pref.	1st	
2011–12	5	1ª And.	2nd	
2012–13	4	3ª	5th	
2013–14	4	3ª	2nd	
2014–15	4	3ª	1st	
2015–16	3	2ª B	16th	Second round
2016–17	3	2ª B	16th	
2017–18	4	3ª	7th	
2018–19	4	3ª	2nd	
2019–20	4	3ª	1st	First round
2020–21	3	2ª B	2nd / 1st	Second round
2021–22	3	1ª RFEF	5th	Round of 32
2022–23	3	1ª Fed.	6th	Round of 32
2023–24	3	1ª Fed.	17th	Second round
2024–25	4	2ª Fed.	9th	
2025–26	4	2ª Fed.	8th	
2026–27	4	2ª Fed.		

- 3 seasons in Primera Federación
- 3 seasons in Segunda División B
- 3 seasons in Segunda Federación
- 6 seasons in Tercera División

== Honours ==
- Segunda División B (1): 2020–21
- Tercera División (2): 2014–15, 2019–20

== Current squad ==
As of 1 March 2026.

Note: Flags indicate national team as defined under FIFA eligibility rules; some limited exceptions apply. Players may hold more than one non-FIFA nationality.

No.	Pos.	Nation	Player
1	GK	ESP	Diego Barrios
2	DF	ESP	Luis Aguado
3	DF	DOM	Manny Rodríguez
4	DF	ESP	Rafa Ortiz
5	MF	BRA	João Paulo
6	MF	ESP	Fran Lara
7	FW	ESP	Hugo Díaz (captain)
8	MF	ESP	Alberto Fuentes
9	FW	ESP	Diego Talaverón
10	FW	ESP	Isra Cano
11	MF	ESP	Isra García
13	GK	ESP	Ángel Hernández

No.	Pos.	Nation	Player
14	MF	ESP	Hugo Aranda
15	FW	ESP	David Velázquez
16	DF	ESP	Carlos Becken
17	MF	ESP	Juan Carlos Menudo
18	FW	SCO	Jack Harper
19	FW	ESP	Álex Caramelo
21	DF	ESP	Victor López
22	DF	ESP	Eu Gutiérrez
23	MF	ESP	Juan Alegre
25	FW	ZAM	Peter Chikola
27	DF	VEN	Alejandro Cova
