= 2013–14 Segunda División B =

Segunda División B
- Season: 2013–14
- Champions: Albacete
- Promoted: Albacete; Llagostera; Leganés; Racing Santander
- Highest attendance: 22,000 (Racing Santander 1–0 Llagostera)

The 2013–14 Segunda División B season was the 37th since its establishment. The first matches of the season were played on 25 August 2013, and the season ended on 22 June 2014 with the promotion play-off finals.

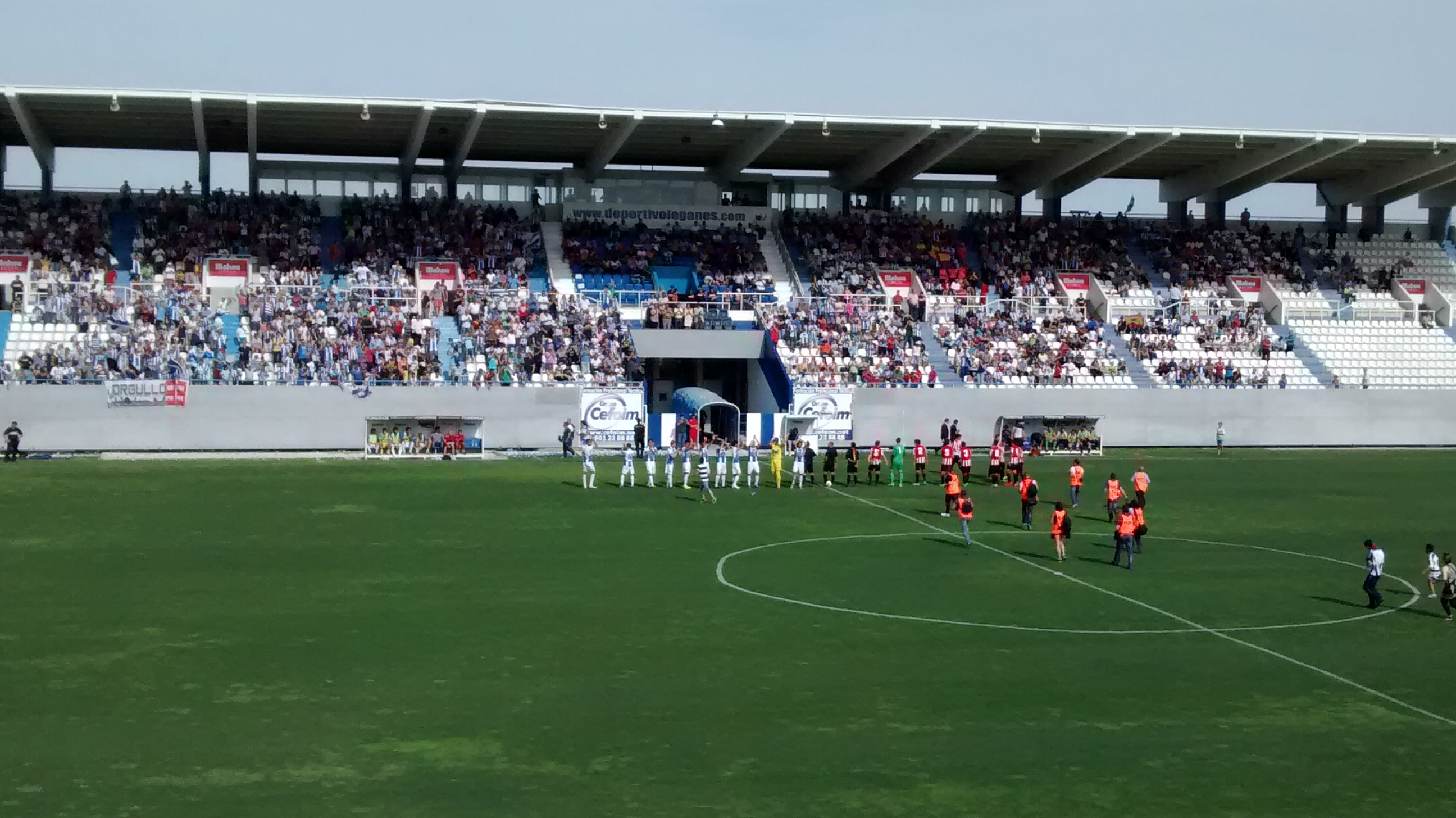
Match between C.D. Leganés and Bilbao Athletic at Estadio Municipal de Butarque, game 38 of group II (1:0).

== Summary before the 2013–14 season ==
Playoffs de Ascenso:

- CD Tenerife (P)
- CD Leganés
- Real Oviedo
- Caudal Deportivo
- Deportivo Alavés (P)
- SD Eibar (P)
- Bilbao Athletic
- Lleida Esportiu
- CE L'Hospitalet
- Huracán Valencia CF
- Levante UD B
- CD Alcoyano
- Real Jaén (P)
- FC Cartagena
- Albacete Balompié
- Lucena CF

Relegated from Segunda División:

- CD Guadalajara
- Racing de Santander
- SD Huesca
- Xerez CD

Promoted from Tercera División:

- Racing de Ferrol (from Group 1)
- Elche CF Ilicitano (from Group 6)
- CD Puerta Bonita (from Group 7)
- Burgos CF (from Group 8)
- Algeciras CF (from Group 10)
- UD Las Palmas Atlético (from Group 12)
- La Hoya Lorca CF (from Group 13)
- CD Sariñena (from Group 17)
- CD Toledo (from Group 18)
- Celta de Vigo B (from Group 1)
- SD Compostela (from Group 1)
- CD Tropezón (from Group 3)
- CD Laudio (from Group 4)
- UE Olot (from Group 5)
- Cultural y Deportiva Leonesa (from Group 8)
- CD El Palo (from Group 9)
- Granada CF B (from Group 9)
- UB Conquense (from Group 18)

Relegated:

- UD San Sebastián de los Reyes (to 3ª Group 7)
- RSD Alcalá (to 3ª Group 7)
- Rayo Vallecano B (to 3ª Group 7)
- CD Marino (to 3ª Group 12)
- Real Zaragoza B (to 3ª Group 17)
- Racing de Santander B (to 3ª Group 3)
- CD Teruel (to 3ª Group 17)
- CA Osasuna B (to 3ª Group 15)
- CD Izarra (to 3ª Group 15)
- CE Constància (relegation revoked)
- RCD Mallorca B (to 3ª Group 11)
- Orihuela CF (to 3ª Group 6)
- Yeclano Deportivo (to 3ª Group 13)
- CD Binissalem (to 3ª Group 11)
- CF Villanovense (to 3ª Group 14)
- UCAM Murcia CF (to 3ª Group 13)
- Loja CD (to 3ª Group 9)
- CD San Roque de Lepe (to 3ª Group 10)
- Real Betis B (to 3ª Group 10)

Dissolved teams and administrative relegations:

- UD Salamanca (dissolved)
- Gimnástica de Torrelavega (administrative relegated)
- Xerez CD (administrative relegated)

Teams covered vacant places by dissolved teams and administrative relegations:

- CE Constància
- Córdoba B
- Team #20

== Groups ==
=== Group I ===
- Avilés
- Burgos
- Caudal de Mieres
- Celta de Vigo B
- Compostela
- Coruxo
- Cultural Leonesa
- Guijuelo
- SD Logroñés
- UD Logroñés
- Marino de Luanco
- Noja
- Ourense
- Racing de Ferrol
- Racing de Santander
- Real Oviedo
- Sporting de Gijón B
- Tropezón
- Zamora

Place number 20 in Group 1 was initially reserved for new creation team Salamanca Athletic, but finally did not register.

=== Group II ===
- Amorebieta
- Atlético Madrid B
- Barakaldo
- Bilbao Athletic
- Conquense
- Fuenlabrada
- Getafe B
- Huesca
- Las Palmas Atlético
- Laudio
- Leganés
- Peña Sport
- Puerta Bonita
- Real Madrid C
- Real Sociedad B
- Real Unión
- CD Sariñena
- Sestao River
- Toledo
- Tudelano

=== Group III ===
- Alcoyano
- At. Baleares
- Badalona
- Constància
- Elche Ilicitano
- Espanyol B
- Gimnàstic de Tarragona
- Huracán Valencia
- L'Hospitalet
- Levante B
- Llagostera
- Lleida Esportiu
- Olímpic Xàtiva
- Ontinyent
- Olot
- Prat
- Reus Deportiu
- Sant Andreu
- Valencia Mestalla
- Villarreal B

=== Group IV ===
- Albacete
- Algeciras
- Almería B
- Arroyo
- At. Sanluqueño
- Cacereño
- Cádiz
- Cartagena
- Córdoba B
- Écija
- El Palo
- Granada B
- Guadalajara
- La Hoya Lorca
- La Roda
- Linense
- Lucena
- Melilla
- San Fernando
- Sevilla Atlético

== Group 1 ==
=== Stadia and locations ===
Location of teams in Segunda División B – Group 1 2013–14

Team	Founded	Home city	Stadium	Capacity	Kitmaker	Sponsor
Avilés	1915	Avilés, Asturias	Román Suárez Puerta	7,200	Joma	
Burgos	1994	Burgos, Castile and León	El Plantío	14,000	Macron	
Caudal	1918	Mieres, Asturias	Hermanos Antuña	4,500	Legea	Rioglass Solar
Celta B	1927	Vigo, Galicia	Barreiro	4,500	Adidas	Citroën
Compostela	1962	Santiago, Galicia	San Lázaro	14,000	esedé	Casa y Baño
Coruxo	1930	Coruxo, Vigo, Galicia	O Vao	1,200	Zico	Fandiño, Pontevedra
Cultural	1923	León, Castile and León	Reino de León	13,451	Hummel	RMD SA
Guijuelo	1974	Guijuelo, Castile and León	Estadio Municipal	1,500	Joma	Jamón de Guijuelo
SD Logroñés	2009	Logroño, La Rioja	Las Gaunas	16,000	Mercury	E3Blanco, Tramek
UD Logroñés	2009	Logroño, La Rioja	Las Gaunas	16,000	Adidas	Natur House
Marino de Luanco	1931	Luanco, Asturias	Miramar	5,000	Joluvi	Posada Org.
Noja	1963	Noja, Cantabria	La Caseta	2,500	Macron	Rio Miera
Ourense	1952	Ourense, Galicia	O Couto	5,200	cdou	Coren
Racing Ferrol	1919	Ferrol, Galicia	A Malata	12,042	Trezze	Reganosa
Racing Santander	1913	Santander, Cantabria	El Sardinero	22,222	Kelme	
Real Oviedo	1926	Oviedo, Asturias	Carlos Tartiere	30,500	Joma	
Sporting B	1967	Gijón, Asturias	Mareo	3,000	Kappa	Gijón
Tropezón	1983	Tanos, Cantabria	Santa Ana	1,500	Acerbis	
Zamora	1969	Zamora, Castile and León	Ruta de la Plata	8,000	Bemiser	Caja Rural

=== League table ===
Pos	Team	Pld	W	D	L	GF	GA	GD	Pts	Qualification or relegation
1	Racing de Santander (P)	36	17	15	4	55	27	+28	66	Qualification for Play-off
2	Racing de Ferrol	36	17	12	7	58	35	+23	63	Qualification for Play-off
3	Real Avilés	36	17	12	7	53	31	+22	63	Qualification for Play-off
4	Guijuelo	36	16	12	8	49	31	+18	60	Qualification for Play-off
5	Oviedo	36	16	9	11	52	42	+10	57	Qualification for 2014–15 Copa del Rey
6	Marino	36	14	12	10	50	34	+16	54 (Note: Marino qualified for Copa del Rey after the exclusion of Racing de Santander for the 2014–15 edition.)	Qualification for 2014–15 Copa del Rey
7	Zamora	36	15	9	12	43	40	+3	54	
8	Ourense (R)	36	13	11	12	36	34	+2	50 (Note: Ourense was relegated to Tercera División for not paying their players.)	Relegation to 2014–15 Tercera División
9	Sporting Gijón B	36	13	11	12	52	50	+2	50	
10	Burgos CF	36	13	7	16	38	44	−6	46	
11	UD Logroñés	36	12	10	14	33	45	−12	46	
12	Tropezón	36	11	11	14	38	55	−17	44	
13	Compostela	36	10	14	12	53	46	+7	44	
14	Cultural Leonesa	36	10	14	12	39	43	−4	44	
15	Coruxo	36	11	11	14	38	47	−9	44	
16	Caudal (R)	36	9	12	15	41	50	−9	39	Qualification for Play-off
17	SD Logroñés (R)	36	9	11	16	36	52	−16	38	Relegation to 2014–15 Tercera División
18	Celta de Vigo B	36	9	7	20	37	61	−24	34 (Note: Celta de Vigo B acquired Ourense vacant.)	
19	Noja (R)	36	4	12	20	36	70	−34	24	Relegation to 2014–15 Tercera División

Source: futbolme
Rules for classification: 1) points; 2) head-to-head points; 3) head-to-head goal difference; 4) head-to-head goals scored; 5) goal difference; 6) number of goals scored.
(P) Promoted; (R) Relegated

=== Results ===
Home \ Away	AVI	BUR	CAU	CEL	COM	COR	LEO	GUJ	SDL	UDL	MAR	NOJ	OUR	RFE	RAC	ROV	SPG	TRO	ZAM
Avilés	—	2–0	2–2	4–0	3–1	2–0	1–1	1–0	1–0	0–0	1–0	3–1	1–0	1–1	0–2	1–2	4–0	1–1	4–0
Burgos	3–0	—	2–1	3–3	3–1	2–1	0–0	1–0	0–1	5–2	0–3	1–1	1–0	0–0	1–0	1–2	1–2	0–1	1–0
Caudal	0–1	1–1	—	3–0	0–0	3–2	2–2	2–1	2–2	1–1	1–0	3–3	2–0	1–1	1–1	0–1	2–1	2–2	0–1
Celta B	1–3	0–1	4–2	—	1–1	1–3	1–0	1–3	2–2	4–0	1–0	2–3	1–0	0–1	1–0	2–2	1–2	0–1	0–1
Compostela	0–0	3–0	2–0	2–1	—	3–1	3–0	1–2	3–0	2–0	2–1	1–1	1–2	4–1	0–2	1–1	1–1	2–2	4–0
Coruxo	0–1	1–2	0–0	0–0	2–1	—	1–3	0–2	3–2	2–1	1–0	1–5	3–0	1–1	1–1	3–2	0–0	0–1	3–1
Cultural Leonesa	2–1	3–1	1–0	1–0	2–2	1–2	—	1–1	2–1	3–0	0–2	1–1	1–2	2–2	0–0	1–3	1–0	3–0	1–1
Guijuelo	1–1	1–0	3–1	2–1	1–1	1–1	0–0	—	1–0	1–2	0–0	3–1	2–1	2–2	3–3	2–1	0–1	2–0	0–2
SD Logroñés	0–2	3–0	2–1	1–0	0–0	1–1	3–1	0–0	—	0–1	2–2	2–0	0–0	2–0	0–2	1–2	3–3	0–0	1–0
UD Logroñés	0–1	1–1	1–2	0–2	2–0	1–0	1–1	1–1	2–0	—	2–1	1–1	2–0	2–2	1–1	1–4	1–0	1–0	0–1
Marino de Luanco	3–2	1–0	2–0	1–1	3–1	1–2	2–1	0–1	3–1	3–1	—	6–0	0–0	1–0	1–1	1–2	1–1	1–1	1–0
Noja	1–3	0–3	0–2	1–2	2–1	0–0	0–1	0–3	1–2	0–0	1–1	—	0–1	1–3	0–0	0–0	2–1	2–2	1–2
Ourense	0–0	3–1	1–0	0–0	1–0	3–1	1–1	0–1	3–0	0–0	2–2	1–0	—	1–2	0–0	2–1	1–2	3–1	1–1
Racing de Ferrol	2–2	1–0	2–0	2–0	2–1	0–0	1–0	0–0	6–0	1–2	0–1	4–2	3–1	—	3–2	0–1	3–1	4–0	3–0
Racing de Santander	1–1	1–0	3–0	3–1	1–1	3–1	1–0	1–0	1–1	1–0	1–1	3–0	1–1	1–0	—	2–0	1–1	0–0	2–1
Real Oviedo	2–0	1–0	1–1	5–1	1–1	0–1	0–0	2–0	1–0	2–1	2–2	2–2	0–1	1–2	2–3	—	1–4	2–1	0–0
Sporting Gijón B	1–1	2–2	1–2	2–0	2–2	0–0	2–0	0–5	1–1	0–1	2–0	4–1	0–2	0–1	3–5	2–1	—	4–1	1–1
Tropezón	2–1	0–1	1–0	0–2	4–3	0–0	2–2	1–3	2–1	2–0	0–2	3–1	1–1	1–1	0–5	1–2	0–2	—	2–0
Zamora	1–1	2–0	2–1	6–0	1–1	2–0	3–0	1–1	3–1	0–1	1–1	2–1	2–1	1–1	1–0	1–0	1–3	1–2	—

Source: BDFutbol
Legend: Blue = home team win; Yellow = draw; Red = away team win.

=== Top goalscorers ===
Last updated 11 May 2014

Goalscorers	Goals	Team
Joselu	30	Compostela
Manu Barreiro	21	Racing de Ferrol
Mamadou Koné	18	Racing de Santander
Álex Arias	14	Real Avilés
Borja Iglesias	13	Celta de Vigo B

=== Top goalkeepers ===
Last updated 11 May 2014

Goalkeeper	Goals	Matches	Average	Team
Wilfred Muñoz	29	35	0.83	Guijuelo
Rafa Ponzo	30	33	0.91	Marino de Luanco
Pato Guillén	28	29	0.97	Ourense
Adrián Laureda	29	29	1	Compostela
José Manuel Camacho	32	30	1.07	Racing de Ferrol

== Group 2 ==
=== Stadia and locations ===
Location of teams in Segunda División B – Group 2 2013–14
Canary Islands

Team	Founded	Home city	Stadium	Capacity	Kitmaker	Sponsor
Amorebieta	1925	Amorebieta-Etxano, Basque Country	Urritxe	3,000	Erreà	Arrinda
Athletic B	1964	Bilbao, Basque Country	Lezama	2,000	Nike	
Atlético B	1966	Madrid, Community of Madrid	Cerro del Espino	3,367	Nike	Azerbaijan
Barakaldo	1917	Barakaldo, Basque Country	Lasesarre	8,000	Erreà	Pollito
Conquense	1946	Cuenca, Castile-La Mancha	La Fuensanta	6,700	Rasán	Global Caja
Fuenlabrada	1975	Fuenlabrada, Community of Madrid	Fernando Torres	2,500	Bemiser	Avimosa
Getafe B	1983	Getafe, Community of Madrid	Ciudad Deportiva	1,500	Joma	
Huesca	1960	Huesca, Aragon	El Alcoraz	5,000	Bemiser	Aragón
Las Palmas Atlético	1941	Las Palmas, Canary Islands	Anexo del Gran Canaria	500	Hummel	
Laudio	2002	Laudio, Basque Country	Ellakuri	3,500	Adidas	
Leganés	1928	Leganés, Community of Madrid	Butarque	8,158	Joma	
Puerta Bonita	1942	Carabanchel, Community of Madrid	Antiguo Canódromo	4,000	Mercury	Isla Azul
Real Madrid C	1952	Madrid, Community of Madrid	Ciudad Real Madrid	3,000	Adidas	Fly Emirates
Peña Sport	1925	Tafalla, Navarre	San Francisco	3,000	Astore	
Real Sociedad B	1951	San Sebastián, Basque Country	Zubieta	2,500	Nike	
Real Unión	1915	Irún, Basque Country	Stadium Gal	5,000	Nike	BM
Sariñena	1945	Sariñena, Aragon	El Carmen	4,000	Barri-Ball	Aragón, Albas Huerva
Sestao River	1996	Sestao, Basque Country	Las Llanas	8,000	Erreà	Sestao Bai
Toledo	1928	Toledo, Castile-La Mancha	Salto del Caballo	5,300	Macron	
Tudelano	1935	Tudela, Navarre	Ciudad de Tudela	9,500	Joma	Urzante

=== League table ===
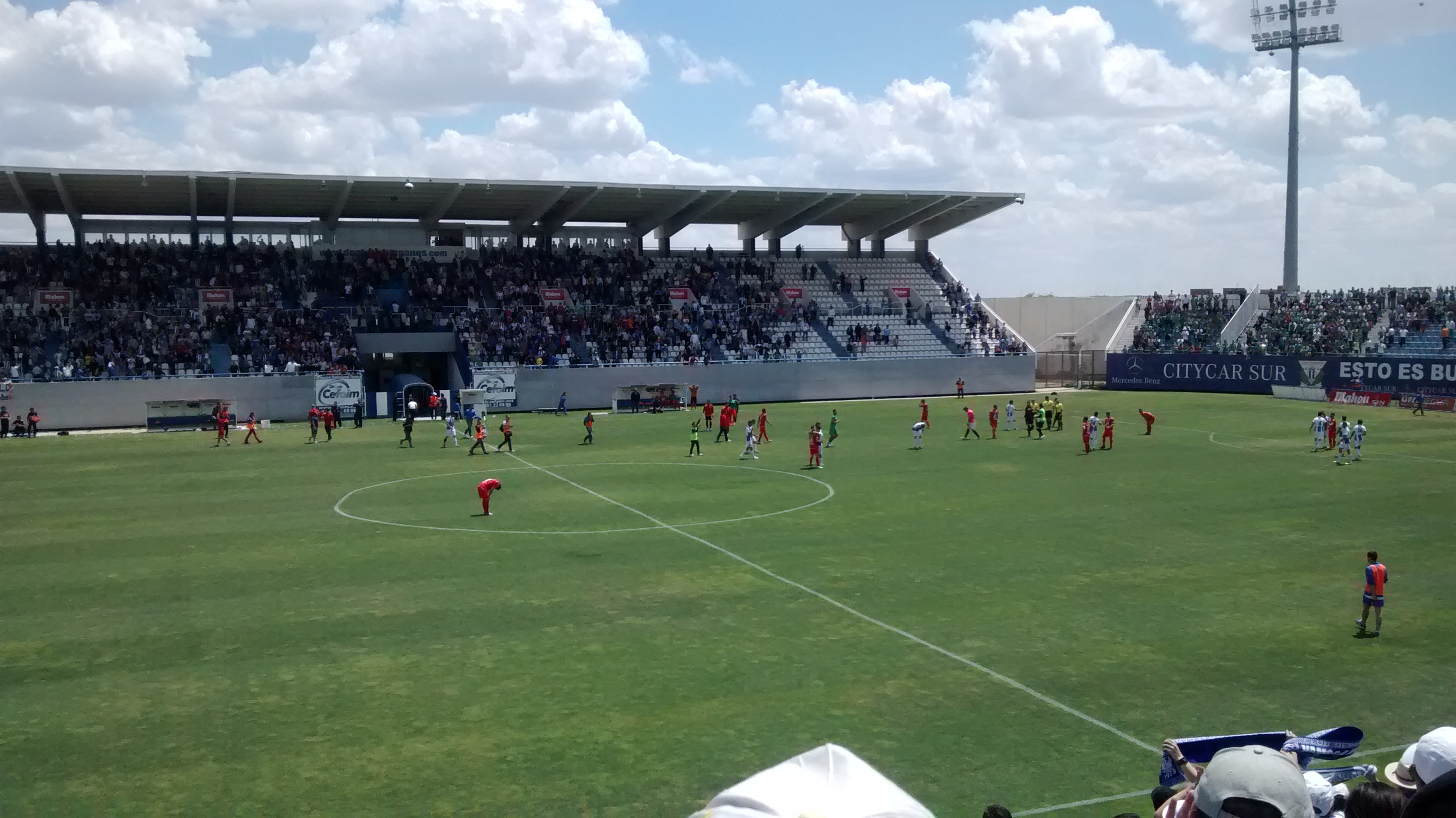
Match between C.D. Leganés and CD Guijuelo at Estadio Municipal de Butarque, second leg of the promotion play-off (1:0).

Pos	Team	Pld	W	D	L	GF	GA	GD	Pts	Qualification or relegation
1	Sestao	38	21	8	9	61	41	+20	71	Qualification for Play-off
2	Leganés (P)	38	20	10	8	53	24	+29	70	Qualification for Play-off
3	Toledo	38	19	10	9	51	33	+18	67	Qualification for Play-off
4	Las Palmas Atlético	38	17	15	6	50	27	+23	66	Qualification for Play-off
5	Athletic B	38	19	8	11	59	38	+21	65	
6	Fuenlabrada	38	17	13	8	51	38	+13	64	Qualification for 2014–15 Copa del Rey
7	Huesca	38	18	9	11	52	43	+9	63	Qualification for 2014–15 Copa del Rey
8	Barakaldo	38	16	12	10	48	37	+11	60	Qualification for 2014–15 Copa del Rey
9	Real Madrid C (R)	38	16	8	14	66	54	+12	56 (Note: Real Madrid C was relegated to Tercera División due to Real Madrid Castilla relegation to Segunda División B.)	Relegation to 2014–15 Tercera División
10	Amorebieta	38	15	10	13	55	54	+1	55	
11	Conquense	38	15	8	15	47	53	−6	53	
12	Real Sociedad B	38	13	12	13	41	38	+3	51	
13	Tudelano	38	10	16	12	45	50	−5	46	
14	Getafe B	38	13	7	18	37	48	−11	46	
15	Real Unión	38	11	11	16	34	42	−8	44	
16	Atlético B (O)	38	10	11	17	43	48	−5	41	Qualification for Play-out
17	Laudio (R)	38	10	7	21	42	66	−24	37	Relegation to 2014–15 Tercera División
18	Puerta Bonita (R)	38	7	15	16	35	52	−17	36	Relegation to 2014–15 Tercera División
19	Peña Sport (R)	38	5	8	25	17	60	−43	23	Relegation to 2014–15 Tercera División
20	Sariñena (R)	38	4	10	24	17	58	−41	22	Relegation to 2014–15 Tercera División

Source: futbolme
Rules for classification: 1) points; 2) head-to-head points; 3) head-to-head goal difference; 4) head-to-head goals scored; 5) goal difference; 6) number of goals scored.
(O) Play-off winners; (P) Promoted; (R) Relegated

=== Results ===
Home \ Away	AMO	ABL	ATM	BRK	CQS	FLA	GET	HUE	LPA	LAU	LEG	PEÑ	PUE	RMC	RSO	RUN	SAR	SES	TOL	TUD
Amorebieta	—	2–1	1–1	1–1	4–0	0–2	3–1	1–2	0–2	3–1	0–0	3–0	2–2	4–3	3–1	3–1	4–0	2–4	1–3	2–2
Athletic B	5–0	—	1–0	2–0	1–0	2–0	2–1	3–0	2–2	2–2	3–2	2–0	4–0	2–2	0–1	1–1	3–0	3–1	0–2	3–3
Atlético B	0–3	1–2	—	0–0	2–1	2–2	1–0	2–3	0–1	3–1	1–0	4–0	3–0	0–1	1–0	1–1	1–2	1–2	1–0	2–2
Barakaldo	1–2	0–1	2–1	—	2–1	0–0	1–0	1–3	1–0	4–2	1–1	3–1	4–0	1–1	0–2	0–0	3–0	1–0	1–0	1–2
Conquense	4–2	1–0	2–2	1–0	—	1–1	2–2	2–0	2–2	3–0	0–1	2–1	2–2	2–0	0–1	1–0	1–0	2–1	3–1	3–1
Fuenlabrada	3–0	1–0	2–1	1–1	1–0	—	1–0	2–1	0–0	1–2	1–1	1–0	1–1	2–1	3–1	0–1	1–1	0–1	2–1	1–1
Getafe B	1–3	2–1	0–4	1–4	3–1	1–2	—	2–1	1–0	2–0	0–2	2–0	1–0	2–1	1–2	0–0	1–0	0–3	0–0	1–2
Huesca	1–1	3–0	4–1	1–0	3–1	1–2	3–1	—	1–3	3–2	1–0	2–0	2–0	1–1	1–0	0–2	1–0	1–1	0–0	2–1
Las Palmas Atlético	1–1	2–2	2–1	0–0	0–1	1–1	0–0	2–0	—	2–0	1–1	4–0	1–0	3–0	3–0	1–1	2–0	2–2	1–0	2–0
Laudio	0–1	2–4	4–1	1–1	0–0	1–4	2–0	2–1	1–1	—	2–1	2–0	2–5	2–0	1–2	1–2	1–0	0–2	0–2	2–2
Leganés	4–0	1–0	1–0	3–0	2–0	0–0	2–1	2–0	2–0	2–0	—	3–1	1–1	0–1	0–1	2–1	1–0	0–0	1–1	3–0
Peña Sport	1–0	2–3	0–1	1–0	1–1	1–1	0–2	0–0	2–2	0–2	0–1	—	0–1	0–2	0–3	0–0	1–0	0–1	0–0	3–1
Puerta Bonita	0–0	0–0	0–0	1–2	0–1	0–2	1–2	1–1	0–0	1–0	0–0	0–1	—	1–1	1–0	2–1	0–1	1–2	3–1	1–1
Real Madrid C	3–0	1–0	0–0	2–3	4–1	3–2	0–2	1–4	1–2	2–0	2–4	3–0	1–1	—	2–0	2–0	6–0	5–2	5–0	0–3
Real Sociedad B	0–2	0–1	1–0	2–2	4–1	3–0	0–0	0–1	0–0	1–1	0–0	0–0	1–1	2–3	—	3–0	0–0	0–0	2–2	3–0
Real Unión	0–0	1–0	2–0	1–2	1–0	2–0	0–3	1–1	0–1	2–0	3–1	2–0	1–3	1–3	1–1	—	2–1	0–1	1–2	1–3
Sariñena	0–0	0–1	1–1	0–2	0–1	1–4	0–0	0–0	0–1	0–1	0–4	2–0	2–2	1–1	1–1	1–0	—	1–2	0–1	1–3
Sestao	2–0	1–0	1–1	0–1	4–1	5–0	1–1	4–1	1–0	2–1	1–3	1–0	3–2	3–1	2–1	1–1	2–0	—	1–3	1–1
Toledo	1–0	0–0	2–1	2–2	4–0	0–0	2–0	1–1	2–0	3–0	1–0	2–0	2–2	2–0	1–2	1–0	2–0	3–0	—	1–0
Tudelano	0–1	1–2	1–1	0–0	0–0	0–4	1–0	0–1	1–3	1–1	1–1	1–1	3–0	1–1	3–0	0–0	1–1	1–0	1–0	—

Source: BDFutbol
Legend: Blue = home team win; Yellow = draw; Red = away team win.

=== Top goalscorers ===
Last updated 11 May 2014

Goalscorers	Goals	Team
Jito	25	Sestao
Germán Beltrán	15	Laudio
Carlos Álvarez	15	Leganés
Mariano Díaz	15	Real Madrid C
Héctor Figueroa	14	Las Palmas Atlético

=== Top goalkeepers ===
Last updated 11 May 2014

Goalkeeper	Goals	Matches	Average	Team
Dani Barrio	22	31	0.71	Leganés
Manolo Rodríguez	24	33	0.73	Toledo
Álex Martín	22	28	0.79	Las Palmas Atlético
Jon Ander Serantes	37	38	0.97	Barakaldo
Basilio Sancho	36	36	1	Fuenlabrada

== Group 3 ==
=== Stadia and locations ===
Location of teams in Segunda División B – Group 3 2013–14

Team	Founded	Home city	Stadium	Capacity	Kitmaker	Sponsor	
Alcoyano	1929	Alcoy, Valencian Community	El Collao	5,000	Rasán	Unión Alcoyana	
Polideportivo de Magaluf	1,000	Joma	Air Europa	Polideportivo de Magaluf	1,000	Joma	Air Europa
Badalona	1903	Badalona, Catalonia	Camp del Centenari	6,500	Score Tech	Tusgsal	
Constància	1922	Inca, Balearic Islands	Nou Camp	10,000	Macron		
Elche Ilicitano	1932	Elche, Valencian Community	Ciudad Deportiva	1,000	Acerbis		
Espanyol B	1981	Sant Adrià de Besòs, Catalonia	Ciutat Esportiva	1,500	Puma	Cancún	
Gimnàstic	1914	Tarragona, Catalonia	Nou Estadi	14,000	N	Tarragona 2017	
Huracán Valencia	2011	Manises, Valencian Community	Municipal de Manises	1,500	Adidas		
L'Hospitalet	1957	L'Hospitalet de Llobregat, Catalonia	Feixa Llarga	6,740	Luanvi		
Levante B	1962	Valencia, Valencian Community	Ciutat Esportiva	1,000	Kelme	Comunitat Valenciana	
Llagostera	1947	Llagostera, Catalonia	Estadi Municipal	1,500	Gedo	La Bruixa d'Or	
Lleida Esportiu	2011	Lleida, Catalonia	Camp d'Esports	13,000	Joma	Ramón Soler	
Olímpic de Xàtiva	1932	Xàtiva, Valencian Community	La Murta	6,000	Mass / Joma		
Olot	1921	Olot, Catalonia	Municipal d'Olot	2,000	Nike	Sant Aniol	
Ontinyent	1947	Ontinyent, Valencian Community	El Clariano	5,000	Rasán	Cañete SA	
Prat	1945	El Prat de Llobregat, Catalonia	Sagnier	1,000	Joma	Carrefour	
Reus Deportiu	1909	Reus, Catalonia	Estadi Municipal	4,700	Gedo	Borges SA	
Sant Andreu	1925	Barcelona, Catalonia	Narcís Sala	8,000	Luanvi		
Valencia Mestalla	1944	Valencia, Valencian Community	Paterna	4,000	Joma	JinKO Solar	
Villarreal B	1999	Villarreal, Valencian Community	Ciudad Deportiva	5,000	Xtep	Pamesa Cerámica	

=== League table ===
Pos	Team	Pld	W	D	L	GF	GA	GD	Pts	Qualification or relegation
1	Llagostera (P)	38	19	12	7	61	36	+25	69	Qualification for Play-off
2	L'Hospitalet	38	19	11	8	61	32	+29	68	Qualification for Play-off
3	Lleida Esportiu	38	19	11	8	52	35	+17	68	Qualification for Play-off
4	Gimnàstic	38	18	13	7	52	37	+15	67	Qualification for Play-off
5	Atlético Baleares	38	19	9	10	53	36	+17	66	Qualification for 2014–15 Copa del Rey
6	Elche Ilicitano	38	18	10	10	60	41	+19	64	
7	Alcoyano	38	17	13	8	52	34	+18	64	Qualification for 2014–15 Copa del Rey
8	Espanyol B	38	14	12	12	43	45	−2	54	
9	Huracán Valencia	38	14	10	14	40	38	+2	52	
10	Olímpic	38	13	13	12	37	35	+2	52	
11	Villarreal B	38	15	6	17	45	42	+3	51	
12	Reus	38	14	9	15	38	49	−11	51	
13	Badalona	38	11	13	14	38	39	−1	46	
14	Olot	38	12	9	17	47	60	−13	45	
15	Sant Andreu	38	11	11	16	33	44	−11	44	
16	Valencia Mestalla (O)	38	11	7	20	39	53	−14	40	Qualification for Play-out
17	Prat (R)	38	9	11	18	31	45	−14	38	Relegation to 2014–15 Tercera División
18	Levante B (R)	38	9	9	20	42	59	−17	36	Relegation to 2014–15 Tercera División
19	Constància (R)	38	7	13	18	23	52	−29	34	Relegation to 2014–15 Tercera División
20	Ontinyent (R)	38	7	6	25	34	69	−35	27	Relegation to 2014–15 Tercera División

Source: futbolme
Rules for classification: 1) points; 2) head-to-head points; 3) head-to-head goal difference; 4) head-to-head goals scored; 5) goal difference; 6) number of goals scored.
(O) Play-off winners; (P) Promoted; (R) Relegated

=== Results ===
Home \ Away	ALY	BAD	BAL	CNS	ELC	ESP	GIM	HOS	HUR	LAG	LEV	LLE	OLO	ONT	PRA	REU	SAN	VMS	VIL	XAT
Alcoyano	—	2–3	0–0	2–0	2–0	2–2	2–0	1–1	1–0	0–1	2–1	0–1	0–0	4–1	1–0	2–1	3–0	2–1	3–2	2–0
Badalona	2–0	—	0–1	2–0	1–1	3–1	2–0	0–0	2–0	2–3	1–1	1–3	1–0	1–1	0–0	3–0	0–0	2–1	0–1	1–2
Atlético Baleares	1–1	1–1	—	0–0	2–1	2–0	1–1	1–2	2–1	2–1	2–1	2–0	2–0	4–0	2–1	3–0	1–0	3–1	2–0	0–0
Constància	1–0	1–0	0–1	—	1–1	0–1	1–1	2–1	0–0	0–3	1–2	0–0	2–1	2–1	0–0	1–1	3–1	0–3	0–3	1–3
Elche Ilicitano	2–0	2–0	3–2	3–0	—	3–1	1–1	0–0	3–0	2–2	3–1	2–1	3–2	1–0	1–0	3–0	2–0	3–1	1–1	1–0
Espanyol B	0–4	0–0	1–1	2–0	2–2	—	1–1	2–2	1–0	1–2	2–1	0–0	1–1	4–3	1–0	2–0	1–0	4–2	0–0	0–0
Gimnàstic	3–1	3–1	0–3	3–0	2–0	1–0	—	2–1	3–1	1–0	2–1	1–2	1–1	1–1	3–0	2–2	0–0	2–1	2–0	3–2
L'Hospitalet	0–1	1–1	5–2	0–1	3–1	2–0	2–0	—	1–0	2–1	1–1	1–1	3–2	3–0	2–0	1–2	0–0	1–0	3–2	2–0
Huracán Valencia	0–0	0–1	2–1	0–0	4–0	1–0	1–1	0–0	—	1–1	1–0	2–0	2–0	3–1	1–2	1–0	0–0	2–0	1–0	2–1
Llagostera	1–1	2–2	3–0	2–2	1–0	3–2	0–0	1–0	1–2	—	2–1	2–1	5–0	2–1	2–1	3–1	2–0	3–1	2–0	3–3
Levante B	2–2	0–1	1–0	2–0	1–5	1–3	1–2	0–1	2–2	1–1	—	0–1	1–1	1–0	1–1	1–2	1–1	2–0	3–1	0–0
Lleida Esportiu	2–2	1–1	1–1	2–0	1–0	1–2	0–0	1–4	2–0	2–0	3–0	—	3–2	5–0	2–1	3–2	1–0	1–0	1–2	0–0
Olot	1–1	1–0	1–0	4–2	0–4	1–0	1–2	2–1	3–2	1–0	3–4	0–2	—	3–1	1–3	2–3	1–1	0–3	0–0	1–0
Ontinyent	0–0	3–2	0–1	1–1	0–0	3–1	1–0	1–3	0–3	1–2	2–0	1–2	1–2	—	0–3	0–1	0–1	0–0	0–2	1–2
Prat	0–1	0–0	2–1	0–0	0–2	0–1	0–1	0–5	1–3	0–0	2–1	1–1	0–0	1–3	—	3–0	2–0	0–2	0–1	2–0
Reus	2–0	0–0	2–2	0–0	1–1	0–0	0–1	2–1	1–1	0–3	1–0	1–2	3–1	1–0	1–2	—	1–0	1–0	2–1	3–1
Sant Andreu	1–1	3–1	2–1	1–0	3–2	0–1	1–0	2–2	2–1	1–1	0–1	3–1	2–1	2–3	0–0	0–1	—	1–2	2–1	1–0
Valencia Mestalla	1–3	2–0	1–0	2–0	0–0	2–1	2–2	0–3	3–0	0–0	1–2	0–0	0–3	2–1	2–2	0–0	2–1	—	0–1	0–3
Villarreal B	0–1	1–0	1–2	3–1	4–1	0–1	1–2	0–0	2–0	1–0	4–2	1–2	0–0	1–2	1–1	2–0	4–1	2–1	—	0–2
Olímpic	2–2	1–0	0–1	0–0	1–0	1–1	2–2	0–1	0–0	0–0	2–1	0–0	1–4	2–0	2–0	1–0	0–0	2–0	1–0	—

Source: BDFutbol
Legend: Blue = home team win; Yellow = draw; Red = away team win.

=== Top goalscorers ===
Last updated 11 May 2014

Goalscorers	Goals	Team
Carlos Martínez	16	Olot
Jaime Mata	15	Lleida Esportiu
Rayco García	14	Alcoyano
Chumbi	14	Valencia Mestalla
Abraham Noé	13	Badalona

=== Top goalkeepers ===
Last updated 11 May 2014

Goalkeeper	Goals	Matches	Average	Team
Xavi Ginard	25	29	0.86	Atlético Baleares
Francis Solar	30	34	0.88	Olímpic de Xàtiva
Carlos Craviotto	34	38	0.89	L'Hospitalet
Pau Torres	35	38	0.92	Lleida Esportiu
José Moragón	35	37	0.95	Llagostera

== Group 4 ==
=== Stadia and locations ===
Location of teams in Segunda División B 2013–14

Team	Founded	Home city	Stadium	Capacity	Kitmaker	Sponsor
Albacete	1940	Albacete, Castile-La Mancha	Carlos Belmonte	17,300	Astore	Bodega Iniesta
Algeciras	1941	Algeciras, Andalusia	Nuevo Mirador	7,100	Cejudo	Cepsa
Almería B	2001	Almería, Andalusia	Juegos del Mediterraneo	23,000	Nike	
Arroyo	1968	Arroyo de la Luz, Extremadura	Municipal	3,000		Comaem SA
At. Sanluqueño	1948	Sanlúcar de Barrameda, Andalusia	El Palmar	5,000	Cejudo	Manzanilla Solear
Cacereño	1919	Cáceres, Extremadura	Príncipe Felipe	7,000	Cejudo	
Cádiz	1910	Cádiz, Andalusia	Ramón de Carranza	20,000	Erreà	GaGà Milano
Cartagena	1995	Cartagena, Region of Murcia	Cartagonova	15,000	Kelme	
Córdoba B	1997	Córdoba, Andalusia	Ciudad Deportiva	3,000	Nike	
Écija	1968	Écija, Andalusia	San Pablo	6,000	Cejudo	Helvetia
El Palo	1972	Málaga, Andalusia	San Ignacio	1,000	Kedeke	
Granada B	1947	Granada, Andalusia	Miguel Prieto	2,500	Luanvi	
Guadalajara	1947	Guadalajara, Castile-La Mancha	Pedro Escartín	8,000	Joma	
La Hoya	2003	Lorca, Region of Murcia	Francisco Artés Carrasco	8,000	Daen	Sakata, San Luis Agricultura
La Roda	1999	La Roda, Castilla-La Mancha	Estadio Municipal	3,000	Joma	Macy
Linense	1912	La Línea de la Concepción, Andalusia	Municipal de La Línea	12,000	Adidas	Lotus
Lucena	1968	Lucena, Andalusia	Ciudad de Lucena	6,000		
Melilla	1976	Melilla	Álvarez Claro	12,000	Lotto	
San Fernando	2009	San Fernando, Cádiz, Andalusia	Iberoamericano	12,000	Joma	
Sevilla Atlético	1958	Seville, Andalusia	Ciudad Deportiva	7,000	Warrior	

=== League table ===
Pos	Team	Pld	W	D	L	GF	GA	GD	Pts	Qualification or relegation
1	Albacete (P)	38	25	7	6	62	30	+32	82	Qualification for Play-off
2	La Hoya Lorca	38	23	10	5	62	22	+40	79	Qualification for Play-off
3	Cartagena	38	21	10	7	59	35	+24	73	Qualification for Play-off
4	Cádiz	38	21	8	9	75	38	+37	71	Qualification for Play-off
5	Guadalajara	38	20	9	9	57	33	+24	69	Qualification for 2014–15 Copa del Rey
6	Granada B	38	17	7	14	65	47	+18	58	
7	Linense	38	16	8	14	51	42	+9	56	
8	Melilla	38	15	10	13	47	45	+2	55	
9	Lucena	38	15	10	13	42	45	−3	55	
10	Cacereño	38	15	8	15	43	49	−6	53	
11	Córdoba B	38	12	9	17	42	50	−8	45	
12	El Palo	38	12	9	17	35	47	−12	45	
13	Almería B	38	11	10	17	42	49	−7	43	
14	Sevilla Atlético	38	11	10	17	33	44	−11	43	
15	Arroyo	38	11	10	17	38	47	−9	43	
16	Algeciras (R)	38	9	16	13	39	45	−6	43	Qualification for Play-out
17	La Roda	38	10	10	18	39	46	−7	40 (Note: La Roda acquired Puertollano's vacant after they resigned to promote.)	Relegation to 2014–15 Tercera División
18	San Fernando (R)	38	9	12	17	36	60	−24	39	Relegation to 2014–15 Tercera División
19	Atlético Sanluqueño (R)	38	10	4	24	34	68	−34	34	Relegation to 2014–15 Tercera División
20	Écija (R)	38	6	5	27	28	87	−59	23	Relegation to 2014–15 Tercera División

Source: futbolme
Rules for classification: 1) points; 2) head-to-head points; 3) head-to-head goal difference; 4) head-to-head goals scored; 5) goal difference; 6) number of goals scored.
(P) Promoted; (R) Relegated

=== Results ===
Home \ Away	ALB	ALG	ALM	ARR	CAC	CÁD	CTG	CÓR	ECJ	GRB	GUA	LIN	LOR	LUC	MEL	PAL	ROD	SAT	SFE	SLU
Albacete	—	1–1	3–0	4–1	2–1	2–1	1–1	1–2	2–1	2–0	3–3	0–2	1–0	2–0	1–0	2–0	3–1	0–0	0–0	1–0
Algeciras	1–0	—	1–1	2–3	1–1	2–1	0–1	2–1	3–1	1–2	1–1	2–0	0–2	0–0	0–0	2–1	2–0	0–3	0–0	2–2
Almería B	2–2	0–1	—	2–1	2–0	3–0	2–2	0–0	3–0	1–2	1–1	0–1	0–1	3–1	2–3	0–1	0–3	0–0	2–1	1–4
Arroyo	0–2	0–0	1–1	—	0–1	0–0	1–1	0–2	2–1	1–1	1–0	0–0	0–2	3–0	2–0	2–0	2–1	2–1	0–0	3–0
Cacereño	1–4	2–3	1–1	1–0	—	0–2	2–0	1–2	1–0	1–0	1–2	2–1	1–2	0–2	1–0	1–2	1–0	0–1	1–1	2–0
Cádiz	4–0	1–0	3–0	3–1	3–4	—	0–0	4–2	2–1	2–1	1–0	3–1	0–0	2–0	5–1	4–0	4–1	3–0	2–1	2–0
Cartagena	0–2	2–2	1–0	3–2	1–0	1–1	—	4–1	6–1	2–1	1–1	3–0	1–2	3–0	2–0	2–1	1–0	1–0	3–1	2–1
Córdoba B	1–0	2–0	2–0	0–1	1–1	1–1	1–3	—	1–0	0–2	0–1	1–2	0–1	0–1	1–2	3–1	1–1	1–0	1–1	1–2
Écija	0–2	0–0	0–1	2–1	0–1	1–6	1–3	1–4	—	1–4	1–2	0–5	0–2	0–2	2–1	2–0	2–0	1–3	2–1	0–3
Granada B	1–2	2–2	3–2	4–3	3–1	3–3	0–0	1–1	6–1	—	1–1	1–0	1–0	3–1	7–0	1–1	1–2	2–0	3–0	1–0
Guadalajara	1–2	2–2	1–0	1–0	4–0	1–0	1–1	3–0	5–1	1–0	—	1–2	1–1	1–1	0–1	1–0	3–1	1–0	5–0	2–1
Linense	0–2	1–0	0–1	1–0	1–0	1–2	0–1	1–2	3–0	2–0	0–1	—	2–2	1–2	1–1	1–2	1–1	2–0	3–1	3–0
La Hoya Lorca	0–0	2–1	1–2	0–0	1–1	3–0	3–0	4–0	4–0	1–0	2–1	4–3	—	1–0	1–0	3–1	1–1	0–0	4–0	4–0
Lucena	1–3	2–1	1–1	3–2	0–0	1–0	0–0	0–2	2–1	1–3	1–0	2–2	0–0	—	2–2	1–1	1–0	1–0	4–0	3–1
Melilla	1–3	1–0	2–2	1–1	0–1	1–1	2–1	0–0	3–0	4–1	3–1	1–2	1–0	1–0	—	2–0	1–0	0–0	2–0	3–1
El Palo	0–2	2–0	2–0	0–1	3–3	1–0	1–2	1–1	0–0	2–0	1–2	0–0	0–0	0–2	1–0	—	2–1	1–0	3–1	3–0
La Roda	2–0	0–0	1–0	2–0	1–2	1–4	2–0	1–1	1–1	0–2	0–1	2–2	0–2	3–0	0–0	0–0	—	2–0	1–1	4–0
Sevilla Atlético	0–1	1–1	0–5	2–0	0–0	2–1	0–1	3–2	0–0	2–1	0–2	0–1	2–1	2–2	1–6	2–0	1–2	—	3–1	4–0
San Fernando	1–3	2–2	2–0	2–0	3–5	1–1	2–0	2–1	0–0	1–0	2–1	2–2	0–1	0–2	0–0	2–0	1–0	0–0	—	1–0
Atlético Sanluqueño	0–1	2–1	0–1	1–1	0–1	0–3	0–3	1–0	2–3	2–1	0–1	0–1	2–4	1–0	2–1	1–1	2–1	0–0	3–2	—

Source: BDFutbol
Legend: Blue = home team win; Yellow = draw; Red = away team win.

=== Top goalscorers ===
Last updated 11 May 2014

Goalscorers	Goals	Team
Quique González	24	Guadalajara
Rubén Cruz	23	Albacete
Airam López	23	Cádiz
Fernando Rodríguez	18	Cartagena
Javi Gómez	18	Lucena

=== Top goalkeepers ===
Last updated 11 May 2014

Goalkeeper	Goals	Matches	Average	Team
Alberto Cifuentes	19	37	0.51	La Hoya Lorca
Álvaro Campos	33	38	0.87	Guadalajara
Limones	34	37	0.92	Cartagena
José Ramón Rodríguez	38	34	1.12	Lucena
Munir Mohand	42	36	1.17	Melilla

== See also ==
- 2013–14 Segunda División
- 2014 Segunda División B play-offs
- 2013–14 Tercera División
- 2013–14 Copa del Rey
