= 2014 Segunda División B play-offs =

The 2014 Segunda División B play-offs (Playoffs de Ascenso or Promoción de Ascenso) are the final playoffs for promotion from 2013–14 Segunda División B to the 2014–15 Segunda División. The four first placed teams in each of the four Segunda División B groups join the Playoffs de Ascenso and the four last placed teams in Segunda División will be relegated to Segunda División B. It also decides the teams which placed 16th to be relegated to the 2014–15 Tercera División.

== Format ==
The four group winners have the opportunity to promote directly and become the overall Segunda División B champion. The four group winners will be drawn into a two-legged series where the two winners will be promoted to the Segunda División and will enter into the final for the Segunda División B champion. The two losing semifinalists will enter the playoff round for the last two promotion spots.

The four group runners-up will be drawn against one of the three fourth-placed teams outside their group while the four third-placed teams will be drawn against each other in a two-legged series. The six winners will advance with the two losing semifinalists to determine the four teams that will enter the last two-legged series for the last two promotion spots. In all the playoff series, the lower-ranked club will play at home first. Whenever there is a tie in position (e.g. like the group winners in the Semifinal Round and Final or the third-placed teams in the first round), a draw will determine the club to play at home first.

== Group Winners promotion play-off ==
=== Qualified teams ===
The draw was held in the RFEF headquarters, in Las Rozas (Madrid), on 12 May 2014, 16:30 CEST.

Group	Team
1	Racing de Santander
2	Sestao
3	Llagostera
4	Albacete

=== Matches ===
==== Semifinals ====
Team 1	Agg.	Team 2	1st leg	2nd leg
Sestao	5–5 (a)	Albacete	3–3	2–2
Llagostera	0–1	Racing de Santander	0–0	0–1

The aggregate winners will be promoted and qualified to the 2013–14 Segunda División B Final. The aggregate losers advance to the second round promotion play-off for non-champions.

===== First leg =====
17 May 2014	Sestao	3 – 3	Albacete	Sestao
20:45 (CEST)	Josu Hernáez 13'; Gerardo 32'; Diamanka 48'	Report	Rubén Cruz 16', 69' (pen.); Calle 86' (pen.)	Stadium: Las Llanas; Attendance: 4,000; Referee: Herrero Arenas

18 May 2014	Llagostera	0 – 0	Racing de Santander	Llagostera
12:00 (CEST)		Report		Stadium: Municipal; Attendance: 2,100; Referee: Salazar López de la Oliva

===== Second leg =====
25 May 2014	Albacete	2 – 2 (5 – 5 (a) agg.)	Sestao	Albacete
18:00 (CEST)	Rubén Cruz 33'; César Díaz 39'	Report	Jito 1' (pen.); Gerardo 20'	Stadium: Carlos Belmonte; Attendance: 17,000; Referee: Pizarro Gómez

25 May 2014	Racing de Santander	1 – 0 (1 – 0 agg.)	Llagostera	Santander
19:00 (CEST)	Sellarès 87' (o.g.)	Report		Stadium: El Sardinero; Attendance: 21,000; Referee: Areces Franco

Promoted to Segunda División
Racing de Santander (One year later)	Albacete (3 years later)

==== Final ====
Team 1	Agg.	Team 2	1st leg	2nd leg
Racing de Santander	3–4	Albacete	1–1	2–3

===== First leg =====
1 June 2014	Racing de Santander	1 – 1	Albacete	Santander
18:00 (CEST)	Ayina 5'	Report	Moutinho 45'	Stadium: El Sardinero; Attendance: 7,000; Referee: González Esteban

===== Second leg =====
8 June 2014	Albacete	3 – 2 (4 – 3 agg.)	Racing de Santander	Albacete
20:00 (CEST)	Calle 64'; Indiano 84'; Jorge Díaz 89'	Report	Ayina 41', 52'	Stadium: Carlos Belmonte; Attendance: 6,500; Referee: Díaz Escudero

Segunda División B
2013–14 Winners
Albacete

== Non-champions promotion play-off ==
=== First round ===
==== Qualified teams ====
The draw was held in the RFEF headquarters, in Las Rozas (Madrid), on 12 May 2014, 16:30 CEST.

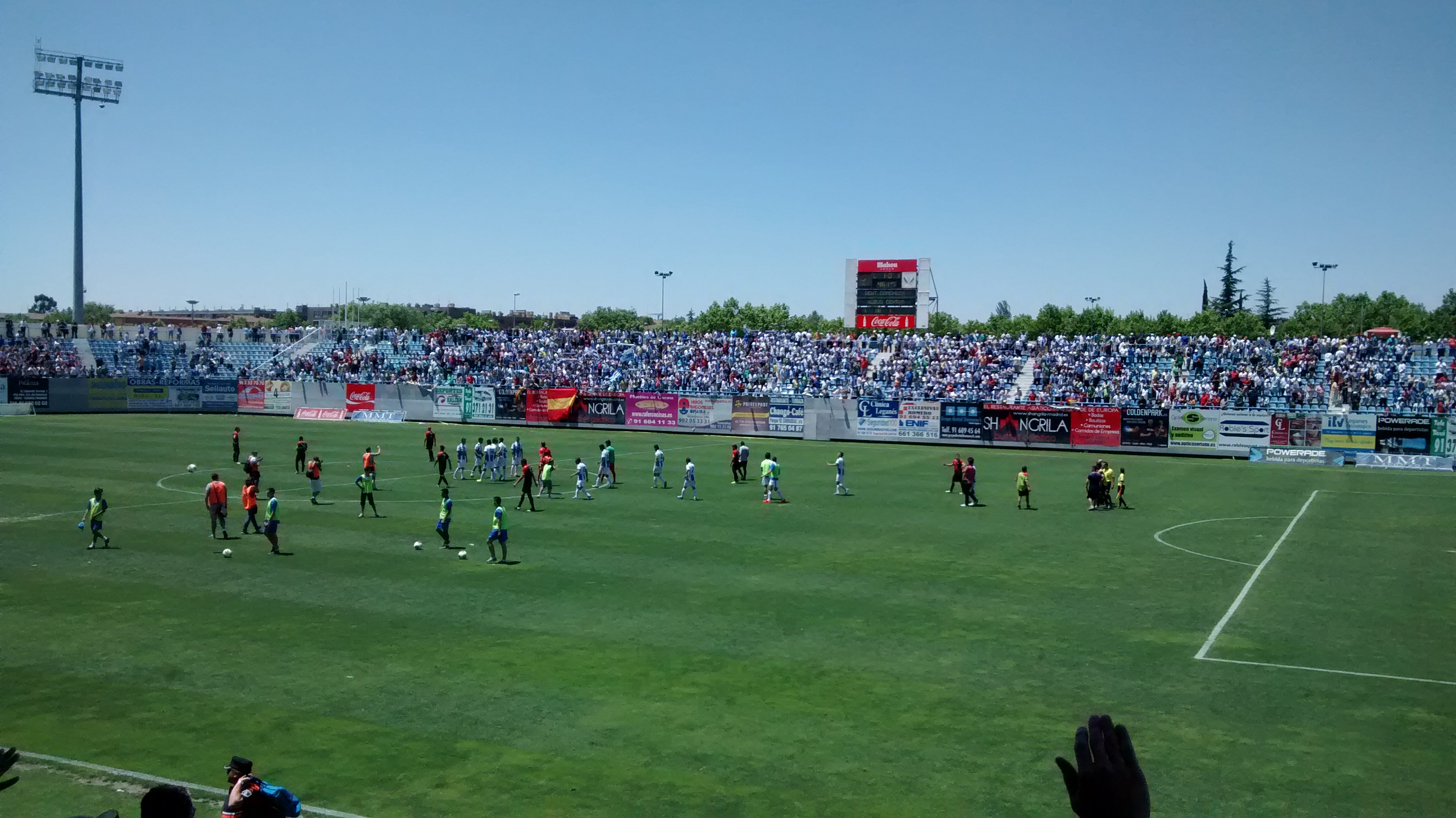
The player of C.D. Leganés celebrating the victory in the first leg match of the promotion play-off against L'Hospitalet.

Group	Position	Team
1	2nd	Racing de Ferrol
2	2nd	Leganés
3	2nd	L'Hospitalet
4	2nd	La Hoya Lorca
1	3rd	Real Avilés
2	3rd	Toledo
3	3rd	Lleida Esportiu
4	3rd	Cartagena
1	4th	Guijuelo
2	4th	Las Palmas Atlético
3	4th	Gimnàstic
4	4th	Cádiz

==== Matches ====
Team 1	Agg.	Team 2	1st leg	2nd leg
Guijuelo	0–1	Leganés	0–0	0–1
Gimnàstic	2–0	Racing de Ferrol	2–0	0–0
Las Palmas Atlético	2–2 (a)	La Hoya Lorca	1–2	1–0
Cádiz	1–2	L'Hospitalet	0–0	1–2
Toledo	2–3	Lleida Esportiu	1–1	1–2
Cartagena	1–5	Real Avilés	1–3	0–2

===== First leg =====
18 May 2014	Las Palmas Atlético	1 – 2	La Hoya Lorca	Las Palmas
10:30 (WEST)	Nili 31'	Report	Carlos Martínez 30'; Nico Fernández 54'	Stadium: Anexo; Attendance: 800; Referee: López Amaya

18 May 2014	Cartagena	1 – 3	Real Avilés	Cartagena
12:00 (CEST)	Megías 52'	Report	Nacho López 15'; Omar 46'; Javi Camochu 88'	Stadium: Cartagonova; Attendance: 4,688; Referee: Sánchez Rico

18 May 2014	Guijuelo	0 – 0	Leganés	Guijuelo
18:30 (CEST)		Report		Stadium: Municipal; Attendance: 1,200; Referee: Corral García

18 May 2014	Toledo	1 – 1	Lleida Esportiu	Toledo
18:30 (CEST)	Albistegi 2'	Report	Milla 88'	Stadium: Salto del Caballo; Attendance: 4,000; Referee: Vicente Moral

18 May 2014	Gimnàstic	2 – 0	Racing de Ferrol	Tarragona
19:00 (CEST)	Piojo 11'; Marcos 27'	Report		Stadium: Nou Estadi; Attendance: 10,098; Referee: Varón Aceitón

18 May 2014	Cádiz	0 – 0	L'Hospitalet	Cádiz
19:00 (CEST)		Report		Stadium: Ramón de Carranza; Attendance: 15,000; Referee: Ortiz Arias

===== Second leg =====
24 May 2014	Racing de Ferrol	0 – 0 (0 – 2 agg.)	Gimnàstic	Ferrol
17:45 (CEST)		Report		Stadium: A Malata; Attendance: 6,000; Referee: Fernández Pérez

24 May 2014	Lleida Esportiu	2 – 1 (3 – 2 agg.)	Toledo	Lleida
18:30 (CEST)	Fuster 58'; Milla 61'	Report	Segovia 43'	Stadium: Camp d'Esports; Attendance: 12,657; Referee: Usón Rosel

25 May 2014	Leganés	1 – 0 (1 – 0 agg.)	Guijuelo	Leganés
12:00 (CEST)	Carlos Álvarez 54'	Report		Stadium: Butarque; Referee: Pulido Santana

25 May 2014	L'Hospitalet	2 – 1 (2 – 1 agg.)	Cádiz	L'Hospitalet de Llobregat
12:00 (CEST)	Moyano 86'; Pirulo 90+3'	Report	Juan Villar 77'	Stadium: La Feixa Llarga; Referee: González González

25 May 2014	Real Avilés	2 – 0 (5 – 1 agg.)	Cartagena	Avilés
18:45 (CEST)	Geni 1'; Matías Fernández 90+1'	Report		Stadium: Román Suárez Puerta; Attendance: 2,789; Referee: López Toca

25 May 2014	La Hoya Lorca	0 – 1 (2 – 2 (a) agg.)	Las Palmas Atlético	Lorca
19:30 (CEST)		Report	Chus 87'	Stadium: Francisco Artés Carrasco; Referee: Sánchez Aparicio

=== Second round ===
==== Qualified teams ====
The draw was held in the RFEF headquarters, in Las Rozas (Madrid), on 26 May 2014, 16:30 CEST.

Group	Position	Team	Notes
2	1st	Sestao	Group Winners promotion play-off losers
3	1st	Llagostera	Group Winners promotion play-off losers
2	2nd	Leganés	First round winners
3	2nd	L'Hospitalet	First round winners
4	2nd	La Hoya Lorca	First round winners
1	3rd	Real Avilés	First round winners
3	3rd	Lleida Esportiu	First round winners
3	4th	Gimnàstic	First round winners

==== Matches ====
Team 1	Agg.	Team 2	1st leg	2nd leg
Gimnàstic	3–2	Sestao	1–1	2–1
Real Avilés	2–3	Llagostera	2–0	0–3
Lleida Esportiu	0–1 (aet)	Leganés	0–0	0–1
La Hoya Lorca	2–2 (a)	L'Hospitalet	2–2	0–0

===== First leg =====
1 June 2014	Lleida Esportiu	0 – 0	Leganés	Lleida
18:00 (CEST)				Stadium: Camp d'Esports; Attendance: 12,322; Referee: Ais Reig

1 June 2014	Real Avilés	2 – 0	Llagostera	Avilés
18:45 (CEST)	Arias 31'; Dani López 76'			Stadium: Román Suárez Puerta; Attendance: 2,703; Referee: Galech Azpeteguía

1 June 2014	Gimnàstic	1 – 1	Sestao	Tarragona
19:00 (CEST)	Lago Junior 48'		Jito 56'	Stadium: Nou Estadi; Attendance: 10,846; Referee: Pérez Peraza

1 June 2014	La Hoya Lorca	2 – 2	L'Hospitalet	Lorca
19:30 (CEST)	Nico 3'; Pallarès 87'		Pol 27'; David Haro 81'	Stadium: Francisco Artés Carrasco; Referee: Carbonell Hernández

===== Second leg =====
7 June 2014	Sestao	1 – 2 (2 – 3 agg.)	Gimnàstic	Sestao
21:00 (CEST)	Jito 37'		Rocha 71'; Querol 76'	Stadium: Las Llanas; Referee: De La Fuente Remos

8 June 2014	Leganés	1 – 0 (a.e.t.) (1 – 0 agg.)	Lleida Esportiu	Leganés
12:00 (CEST)	Mantovani 92'			Stadium: Butarque; Attendance: 6,500; Referee: Hernández Maeso

8 June 2014	L'Hospitalet	0 – 0 (2 – 2 (a) agg.)	La Hoya Lorca	L'Hospitalet de Llobregat
12:00 (CEST)				Stadium: La Feixa Llarga; Referee: Fernández Ortega

8 June 2014	Llagostera	3 – 0 (3 – 2 agg.)	Real Avilés	Llagostera
19:00 (CEST)	Pi 14'; Chamorro 20'; Pitu 56'			Stadium: Municipal; Attendance: 1,500; Referee: Fernández Vial

=== Third round ===
==== Qualified teams ====
The draw was held in the RFEF headquarters, in Las Rozas (Madrid), on 9 June 2014, 16:30 CEST.

Group	Position	Team
3	1st	Llagostera
2	2nd	Leganés
3	2nd	L'Hospitalet
3	4th	Gimnàstic

==== Matches ====
Team 1	Agg.	Team 2	1st leg	2nd leg
Gimnàstic	3–4 (aet)	Llagostera	2–1	1–3
Leganés	2–1	L'Hospitalet	1–0	1–1

===== First leg =====
15 June 2014	Leganés	1 – 0	L'Hospitalet	Leganés
12:00 (CEST)	Carlos Álvarez 85'			Stadium: Butarque; Attendance: 7,500

15 June 2014	Gimnàstic	2 – 1	Llagostera	Tarragona
19:00 (CEST)	Lago Junior 65'; David Rocha 68'		Marc Serallès 56'	Stadium: Nou Estadi; Attendance: 12,876

===== Second leg =====
21 June 2014	Llagostera	3 – 1 (a.e.t.) (4 – 3 agg.)	Gimnàstic	Llagostera
19:00 (CEST)	Eloy Gila 29'; Jordi López 45'; Nuha 92'		Marcos 58'	Stadium: Municipal; Attendance: 2,000; Referee: Rubén Eiriz Mata

22 June 2014	L'Hospitalet	1 – 1 (1 – 2 agg.)	Leganés	L'Hospitalet de Llobregat
19:30 (CEST)	Ariday 51'		Carlos Álvarez 45'	Stadium: La Feixa Llarga; Referee: Melgares de Aguilar Fernández

Promoted to Segunda División
Llagostera (First time ever)	Leganés (10 years after)

== Relegation play-off ==
=== Qualified teams ===
The draw was held in the RFEF headquarters, in Las Rozas (Madrid), on 12 May 2014, 16:30 CEST.

Group	Position	Team
1	16th	Caudal
2	16th	Atlético Madrid B
3	16th	Valencia Mestalla
4	16th	Algeciras

=== Matches ===
==== Finals ====
Team 1	Agg.	Team 2	1st leg	2nd leg
Algeciras	2–4	Valencia Mestalla	2–3	0–1
Caudal	0–4	Atlético Madrid B	0–1	0–3

The losers of this tournament will be relegated to the 2014–15 Tercera División.

===== First leg =====
18 May 2014	Caudal	0 – 1	Atlético Madrid B	Mieres
18:30 (CEST)		Report	Samu 65'	Stadium: Hermanos Antuña; Attendance: 1,960; Referee: García Ballesteros

18 May 2014	Algeciras	2 – 3	Valencia Mestalla	Algeciras
20:00 (CEST)	Martins 5'; Víctor 80'	Report	Parada 15' (o.g.); Chumbi 45', 77'	Stadium: Nuevo Mirador; Referee: Collado López

===== Second leg =====
25 May 2014	Atlético Madrid B	3 – 0 (4 – 0 agg.)	Caudal	Majadahonda
18:00 (CEST)	Rubén Mesa 23'; Iván Sánchez 53'; Samu 71'	Report		Stadium: Cerro del Espino; Attendance: 750; Referee: Domínguez Cervantes

25 May 2014	Valencia Mestalla	1 – 0 (4 – 2 agg.)	Algeciras	Valencia
19:00 (CEST)	Chumbi 81'	Report		Stadium: Mestalla; Attendance: 15,000; Referee: Alberola Rojas

Relegated to Tercera División
Caudal	Algeciras

== See also ==
- 2014 Segunda División play-offs
- 2014 Tercera División play-offs
