= Hernáez =

Hernáez is a rare, shortened variant of the more popular Hernández, without the nd. Notable people with the surname include:

- Josu Hernáez (born 1985), Spanish footballer
- Constancio Hernáez (born 1957), Spanish composer
