= Jito (disambiguation) =

Jito can refer to:

- Jito, the medieval land stewards in Japan
- Empress Jitō
- Mata Jito, the wife of Guru Gobind Singh
- Jito (footballer) (b. 1980), Spanish footballer, full name Juan José Silvestre Cantó
