= Anton Efremov =

Russian footballer

Anton Yefremov
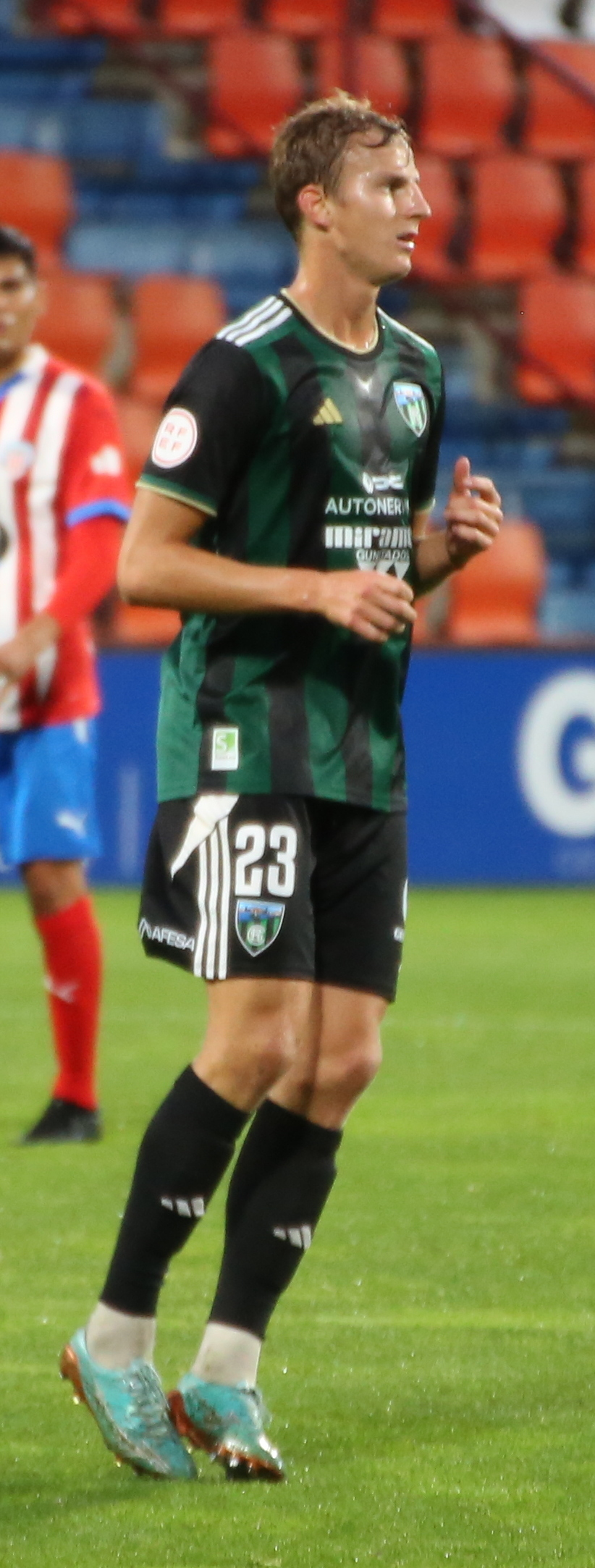
- Efremov with Sestao River in 2024

Personal information
- Full name: Anton Artyomovich Yefremov
- Date of birth: 11 June 2003 (age 23)
- Place of birth: Nizhny Novgorod, Russia
- Height: 1.90 m (6 ft 3 in)
- Position: Centre-back

Team information
- Current team: Sestao River
- Number: 4

Youth career
- 2007–2013: DYuTs Sormovo
- 2013–2016: Nizhny Novgorod
- 2016–2019: Lokomotiv Moscow
- 2019–2020: Villarreal
- 2020–2021: Chertanovo Moscow
- 2021–2022: Villarreal
- 2022: → Roda (loan)

Senior career*
Years	Team	Apps	(Gls)
2020–2021	Chertanovo Moscow	1	(0)
2022–2025	Villarreal C	42	(2)
2024–2025	→ Sestao River (loan)	32	(0)
2025–2026	Osasuna B	1	(0)
2026–	Sestao River	4	(0)

International career^{‡}
2018	Russia U15	5	(0)
2018	Russia U16	5	(0)
2019–2020	Russia U17	4	(0)
2021	Russia U18	3	(0)
2021	Russia U19	7	(0)
2022	Russia U21	1	(0)
- * Club domestic league appearances and goals as of 1 November 2026 ‡ National team caps and goals as of 16 November 2022

Anton Artyomovich Efremov (Russian: Антон Артёмович Ефремов; born 11 June 2003) is a Russian professional footballer who plays as a central defender for Spanish Segunda Federación club Sestao River.

== Club career ==
Efremov began at the DYuTs Sormovo municipal academy in the Sormovo City District of Nizhny Novgorod. In this subsidiary club of the FC Volga Nizhny Novgorod, his coach for 3 seasons was the Spanish José Luis Lorenzo Ortega, who sent reports to Villarreal where he reported the quality of the player. Despite the reports, Lokomotiv Moscow moved faster and signed the player where he spent 3 seasons.

In the 2019–20 season, his first year as a youth, he remained on Villarreal training with Juvenil A but was unable to debut in the league due to bureaucratic delays with his visa in Spain. This tired the player who returned to Russia to play for the Chertanovo Moscow academy where he received the opportunity to debut in the Russian Football National League on 17 October 2020 in a game against Veles Moscow at only 17 years old, just started his youth stage. and another game in the Russian Cup, at just 17 years old, just beginning his youth stage.

In July 2021, Villarreal decided to make every effort to sign Antón Efremov, signing him as a property with a professional contract until 30 June 2024. After his signing, the Villarreal football department cataloged him as their new Pau Torres. In the 2022–23 season, Efremov played his first season in senior football in Villarreal's second reserve team at the Tercera Federación.

On 30 August 2024, Efremov joined Sestao River in the third-tier Primera Federación on a season-long loan.

On 14 August 2025, Efremov moved to Osasuna on a one-year contract with two more optional additional years, for their reserve team Osasuna Promesas in Primera Federación.

== Career statistics ==
As of match played 17 October 2020

Appearances and goals by club, season and competition
Club	Season	League			Cup		Continental		Other		Total	
Club	Season	Division	Apps	Goals	Apps	Goals	Apps	Goals	Apps	Goals	Apps	Goals
Chertanovo Moscow	2020–21	Russian Second League	1	0	1	0	—		—		2	0
Villarreal C	2022–23	Tercera Federación	0	0	—		—		—		0	0
Career total			1	0	1	0	0	0	0	0	2	0
