= Gerardo Carrera =

Spanish footballer (born 1987)

Gerardo
Personal information
- Full name: Gerardo Carrera Piñera
- Date of birth: 5 March 1987 (age 39)
- Place of birth: Gijón, Spain
- Height: 1.76 m (5 ft 9 in)
- Position: Attacking midfielder

Team information
- Current team: Sarriana

Youth career
- Colegio Corazón María
- Sporting Gijón
- Roces

Senior career*
Years	Team	Apps	(Gls)
2006	Sporting Gijón B	1	(0)
2006–2007	Siero	31	(6)
2007–2008	Málaga B	20	(4)
2007–2008	Málaga	11	(3)
2008–2009	Las Palmas	24	(1)
2009–2011	Pontevedra	38	(8)
2011	Alcorcón	15	(1)
2011–2012	Teruel	20	(1)
2012	Toledo	14	(2)
2012–2013	Noja	32	(7)
2013–2014	Sestao	35	(6)
2014–2015	Barakaldo	35	(5)
2015–2017	Racing Villalbés	60	(32)
2017–2019	Somozas	69	(26)
2019–2021	Viveiro	35	(15)
2021–	Sarriana	43	(32)
- * Club domestic league appearances and goals as of 13:27, 4 July 2022 (UTC)

Gerardo Carrera Piñera (born 5 March 1987 in Gijón, Asturias), known simply as Gerardo, is a Spanish professional footballer who plays for SD Sarriana as an attacking midfielder. He previously played for Sestao River Club.
