= Andoni Ugarte =

Spanish footballer (born 1995)

Personal information
- Full name: Andoni Ugarte Mendizabal
- Date of birth: 5 April 1995 (age 31)
- Place of birth: Oñati, Spain
- Height: 1.91 m (6 ft 3 in)
- Position: Centre back

Team information
- Current team: UD Logroñés
- Number: 6

Youth career
- Real Sociedad

Senior career*
Years	Team	Apps	(Gls)
2014–2018	Real Sociedad B	111	(3)
2018–2021	Oviedo B	82	(7)
2021–22	Calahorra	20	(0)
2022–2023	Sestao River	30	(2)
2023–	UD Logroñés	47	(2)
- * Club domestic league appearances and goals as of 7 May 2026

Andoni Ugarte Mendizabal (born 5 April 1995) is a Spanish footballer who plays as a central defender for UD Logroñés.

== Club career ==
Ugarte was born in Oñati, Gipuzkoa, Basque Country. A Real Sociedad youth graduate, he made his senior debut with the reserves on 5 January 2014, starting in a 0–3 Segunda División B away loss against CD Tudelano.

Ugarte was definitely promoted to the B-team on 11 July 2014, and scored his first senior goal on 15 November, in a 3–2 away defeat of SD Amorebieta. On 26 June 2018, after being released by the Txuri-urdin, he moved to another reserve team, Real Oviedo Vetusta also in the third division.

On 11 June 2019, Ugarte was one of seven players from the B-side who were promoted to Real Oviedo's first team for the 2019–20 Segunda División campaign.

On 11 June 2020, he joined to Primera División RFEF club Calahorra.
