= Álex Arias =

Spanish footballer

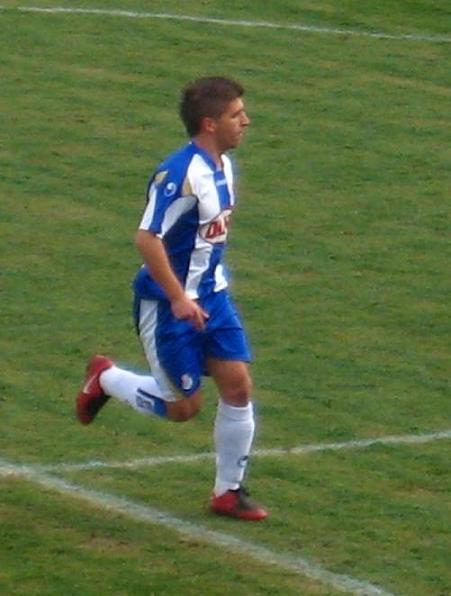

Personal information
- Full name: Alejandro Miguel Arias de Haro
- Date of birth: 13 June 1989 (age 37)
- Place of birth: Avilés, Spain
- Height: 1.70 m (5 ft 7 in)
- Position: Winger

Team information
- Current team: Covadonga

Youth career
- 1999–2007: Oviedo
- 2007–2008: Espanyol

Senior career*
| Years | Team | Apps | (Gls) |
| 2006–2007 | Oviedo | 13 | (0) |
| 2007–2010 | Espanyol B | 2 | (0) |
| 2008–2009 | → Premià (loan) | 12 | (0) |
| 2009–2010 | → Moratalla (loan) | 33 | (1) |
| 2010–2011 | Unión Estepona | 24 | (1) |
| 2011–2013 | Marino Luanco | 66 | (13) |
| 2013–2014 | Avilés | 37 | (15) |
| 2014–2015 | Numancia | 6 | (0) |
| 2015 | → Avilés (loan) | 18 | (1) |
| 2016–2017 | Avilés | 32 | (8) |
| 2017–2018 | Coruxo | 31 | (5) |
| 2018–2021 | Marino Luanco | 82 | (26) |
| 2021–2023 | Calahorra | 68 | (6) |
| 2023–2024 | Logroñés | 31 | (6) |
| 2024–2025 | Marino Luanco | 29 | (1) |
| 2025– | Covadonga | 4 | (4) |
- * Club domestic league appearances and goals as of 28 September 2025

Alejandro 'Álex' Miguel Arias de Haro (born 13 June 1989) is a Spanish footballer who plays as a winger for Tercera Federación club Covadonga.

== Club career ==
Born in Avilés, Asturias, Arias began his career with Real Oviedo, making his senior debuts in the 2006–07 campaign in the Segunda División B. In 2007, he moved to RCD Espanyol, being initially assigned to the youth setup and appearing rarely with the reserves also in the third tier.

In the 2008 summer Arias was loaned to Tercera División club CE Premià, and joined Moratalla CF in 2009 also on loan. He terminated his contract with the Pericos in June 2010, and continued to appear in the third tier in the following seasons, representing Marino de Luanco and Real Avilés. With the latter he scored a career-best 15 goals, as the club missed out promotion in the play-offs.

On 20 June 2014 Arias signed a two-year deal with Segunda División side CD Numancia. He played his first match as a professional on 31 August, coming on as a late substitute in a 1–2 away loss against Real Betis.

On 13 January 2015, after appearing sparingly, Arias was loaned to Avilés until June. In August 2016, after spending a year in prison, he returned to Avilés on a permanent contract.

On 2 July 2021, he joined Primera División RFEF club Calahorra.

== Personal life ==
On 15 August 2011 Arias was involved in a car accident, killing two people by driving drunk in a small town near Salamanca, but was only tried in January 2015. He was arrested in August after being found guilty, receiving a four-year sentence.
