= Josu Hernáez =

Spanish footballer

Personal information
- Full name: Josu Hernáez Lopetegui
- Date of birth: 4 July 1985 (age 41)
- Place of birth: Eibar, Spain
- Height: 1.75 m (5 ft 9 in)
- Position: Forward

Youth career
- Eibar

Senior career*
Years	Team	Apps	(Gls)
2004–2006	Durango		
2006–2007	Eibar	9	(0)
2007–2008	Bilbao Athletic	4	(0)
2008–2009	Zaragoza B	16	(3)
2009–2014	Sestao	119	(17)
2014–2016	Mirandés	6	(0)
2016–2018	Real Unión	38	(1)
- * Club domestic league appearances and goals as of 4 November 2017

Josu Hernáez Lopetegui (born 4 July 1985) is a Spanish footballer who plays as a forward.

== Football career ==
Born in Eibar, Gipuzkoa, Basque Country, Hernáez played for SD Eibar's youth setup before eventually joining seven-a-side football. In the 2004 summer he moved to SCD Durango, and made his debuts as a senior during the campaign, in Tercera División. In 2006, he returned to Eibar, being assigned to the main squad in Segunda División B.

On 13 July 2007 Hernáez joined Athletic Bilbao, being assigned to the reserves also in the third level. However, after featuring rarely with the Lions, he moved to another reserve team, Real Zaragoza B on 18 January of the following year.

In September 2008 Hernáez suffered a serious knee injury which took him out of the entire 2008–09 season. He was later released by the Aragonese, and moved to Sestao River Club in the 2009 summer.

On 29 August 2014 Hernáez joined Segunda División's CD Mirandés. He made his professional debut on 14 September, aged 29, playing the entire second half in a 0–1 away loss against CD Tenerife.
