= Alejandro Martín =

Spanish footballer

Ale Martín
Personal information
- Full name: Alejandro Martín Méndez
- Date of birth: 24 April 1990 (age 36)
- Place of birth: Las Palmas, Spain
- Height: 1.90 m (6 ft 3 in)
- Position: Goalkeeper

Team information
- Current team: Lanzarote

Youth career
- Estudiantes
- Lanzarote
- Las Palmas

Senior career*
Years	Team	Apps	(Gls)
2009–2015	Las Palmas B	125	(0)
2010–2011	→ Lanzarote (loan)	21	(0)
2012	Las Palmas	1	(0)
2015–2016	Unión Sur Yaiza	20	(0)
2016–2020	Lanzarote	49	(0)
2020–2021	Unión Sur Yaiza		
2021–	Lanzarote	40	(0)
- * Club domestic league appearances and goals as of 6 October 2024

Alejandro 'Ale' Martín Méndez (born 24 April 1990) is a Spanish footballer who plays for Lanzarote as a goalkeeper.

== Club career ==
Born in Las Palmas, Canary Islands, Martín finished his graduation with UD Las Palmas, and made his senior debuts with the reserves in the 2008–09 season, in Segunda División B. In August 2010 he was loaned to neighbouring UD Lanzarote, in Tercera División. A season later Martín returned to the B-team, now in the fourth level.

On 15 October 2012, due to Mariano Barbosa's suspension and Raúl Lizoain's injury, Martín made his professional debut, starting in a 2–3 away loss against Real Madrid Castilla, in the Segunda División championship; it was his maiden first team appearance, however. Released in 2015, he moved to fellow Tercera División side CD Unión Sur Yaiza on 25 September.
