= Constancio Hernáez =

Spanish composer (born 1957)

Constancio Hernáez Marco (born 1957) is a Spanish composer.

Constancio Hernáez Marco was born in Madrid in 1957, and studied piano, harmony, counterpoint, composition and voice. In addition, he holds a degree in economics from the Autonomous University of Madrid. He is an active participant in the development and promotion of contemporary music in Madrid, and is a member and co-founder of Ars Voluptas and the Tres Cantos International Contemporary Music Festival. He is also involved with the Madrid Contemporary Music Festival (COMA). Constancio Hernáez’s oeuvre ranges from solo works to chamber music, and his music for voice and strings has been premiered by prestigious musicians at the Juan March Foundation, the Círculo de Bellas Artes, the Ateneo de Madrid, the San Fernando Royal Academy of Fine Arts, the Gran Teatro in Havana, Cuba (2004), the Teatro Colón in Buenos Aires (2004), Il Novecento e la Voce Villorba, Italy (2007), the Cervantes Institute, Utrecht, Holland (2008), the 13th Classics Ribagorza Festival in Huesca, the 27th Religious Polyphonic Choir Festival, Segorbe, Valencia, the Palacio del Teatro Lírico Nacional in Cuba (2011), the Tres Cantos Auditorium and the Madrid Royal Conservatory of Music (RCSMM).

A recording of his complete works for solo voice and piano was issued by Naxos in 2018, performed by soprano Marta Toba, baritone José Manuel Conde, and pianist Sebastián Mariné.
