= Jito (footballer) =

Spanish footballer

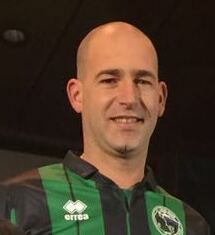

Personal information
- Full name: Juan José Silvestre Cantó
- Date of birth: 2 March 1980 (age 46)
- Place of birth: Barcelona, Spain
- Height: 1.85 m (6 ft 1 in)
- Position: Striker

Youth career
- Meridiana Torre Baró
- 1990–1998: Barcelona

Senior career*
Years	Team	Apps	(Gls)
1997–1999	Barcelona C	30	(10)
1999–2000	Oviedo B	15	(3)
2000–2001	Palamós	50	(30)
2001	Almería	7	(0)
2001–2002	Lorca Deportiva	19	(19)
2002–2003	Cartagonova	16	(1)
2003–2004	Gavà	16	(14)
2004–2005	Figueres	50	(15)
2005–2006	Sant Andreu	12	(2)
2006	Orihuela	17	(6)
2006–2007	Portuense	31	(12)
2007–2009	Girona	52	(14)
2009–2010	Cultural Leonesa	33	(23)
2010–2012	Alavés	60	(22)
2012–2013	Eibar	19	(5)
2013–2016	Sestao	96	(49)
Total		523	(225)
- * Club domestic league appearances and goals

Juan José Silvestre Cantó (born 2 March 1980), known as Jito, is a Spanish former professional footballer who played as a striker.

== Club career ==
Jito was born in Barcelona, Catalonia. A veteran of 15 Segunda División B seasons, scoring 143 goals for a host of clubs, his professional input consisted of 22 Segunda División matches and three goals for Girona FC in 2008–09.

In August 2016, after three years in the third tier with Sestao River Club, Jito retired at the age of 36.
