= Sestao River Club =

Association football club in Spain

Coordinates: 43.311044°N 3.009575°W

Sestao
- Full name: Sestao River Club
- Nickname: Verdinegros (The green-blacks)
- Founded: 1996; 30 years ago
- Stadium: Las Llanas
- Capacity: 4,367
- President: Ángel Castro
- Head coach: Aner Blanco
- League: Segunda Federación – Group 1
- 2025–26: Segunda Federación – Group 2, 7th of 18
- Website: www.sestaoriverclub.com
Home colours	Away colours

Sestao River Club is a Spanish football team based in Sestao, in the autonomous community of Basque Country. Founded in 1996 it plays in Segunda Federación – Group 1, hosting home games at Estadio Las Llanas, with a capacity of 8,905 seats.

== History ==
Sestao River Club was founded in 1996, immediately after the disappearance of historic Sestao Sport Club, due to economic problems. It first reached the third division in 2004, going on to remain there for the vast majority of the following years.

In 2014 the club finished as champion of the group 2 of the Segunda División B, but failed to promote to Segunda División after being eliminated in the play-offs.

=== Club background ===
- Sestao Sport Club – (1916–1996)
- Sestao River Club – (1996–present)

== Season to season ==
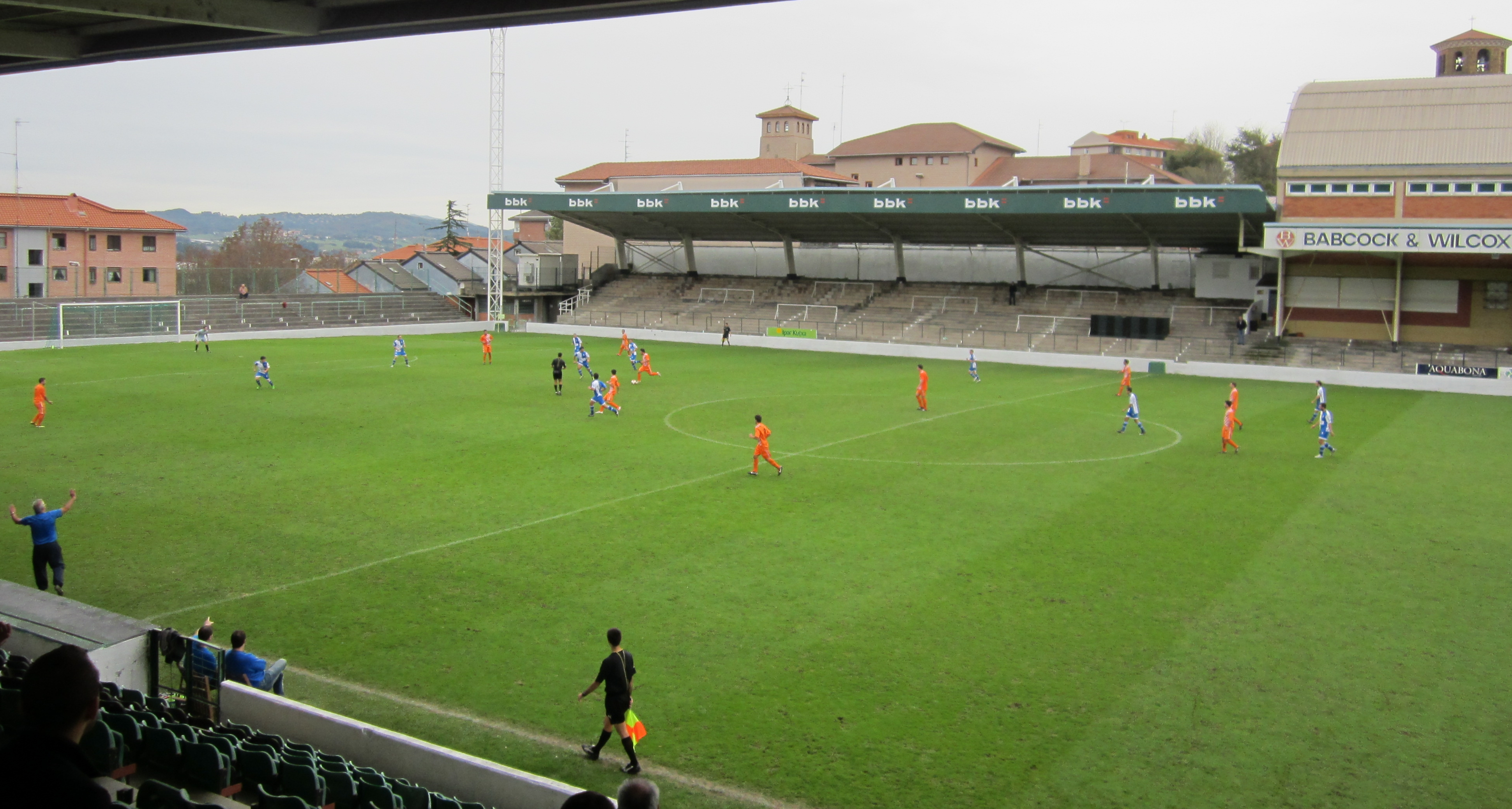
Estadio Las Llanas, home of Sestao River.

=== Sestao Sport Club ===
- 17 seasons in Segunda División
- 10 seasons in Segunda División B
- 32 seasons in Tercera División (3rd tier)

=== Sestao River Club ===
Season	Tier	Division	Place	Copa del Rey
1996–97	7	2ª Terr.	1st	
1997–98	6	1ª Terr.	2nd	
1998–99	5	Terr. Pref.	1st	
1999–2000	4	3ª	6th	
2000–01	4	3ª	3rd	
2001–02	4	3ª	2nd	
2002–03	4	3ª	8th	
2003–04	4	3ª	1st	
2004–05	3	2ª B	18th	First round
2005–06	4	3ª	1st	
2006–07	3	2ª B	5th	First round
2007–08	3	2ª B	10th	First round
2008–09	3	2ª B	15th	
2009–10	3	2ª B	17th	
2010–11	4	3ª	3rd	
2011–12	3	2ª B	10th	
2012–13	3	2ª B	12th	
2013–14	3	2ª B	1st	
2014–15	3	2ª B	13th	First round
2015–16	3	2ª B	6th	

Season	Tier	Division	Place	Copa del Rey
2016–17	3	2ª B	19th	Second round
2017–18	4	3ª	4th	
2018–19	4	3ª	2nd	
2019–20	4	3ª	2nd	Second round
2020–21	4	3ª	3rd	
2021–22	4	2ª RFEF	2nd	
2022–23	4	2ª Fed.	1st	
2023–24	3	1ª Fed.	11th	Second round
2024–25	3	1ª Fed.	17th	
2025–26	4	2ª Fed.	7th	
2026–27	4	2ª Fed.		TBD

- 2 seasons in Primera Federación
- 11 seasons in Segunda División B
- 4 seasons in Segunda Federación/Segunda División RFEF
- 11 seasons in Tercera División

== Current squad ==
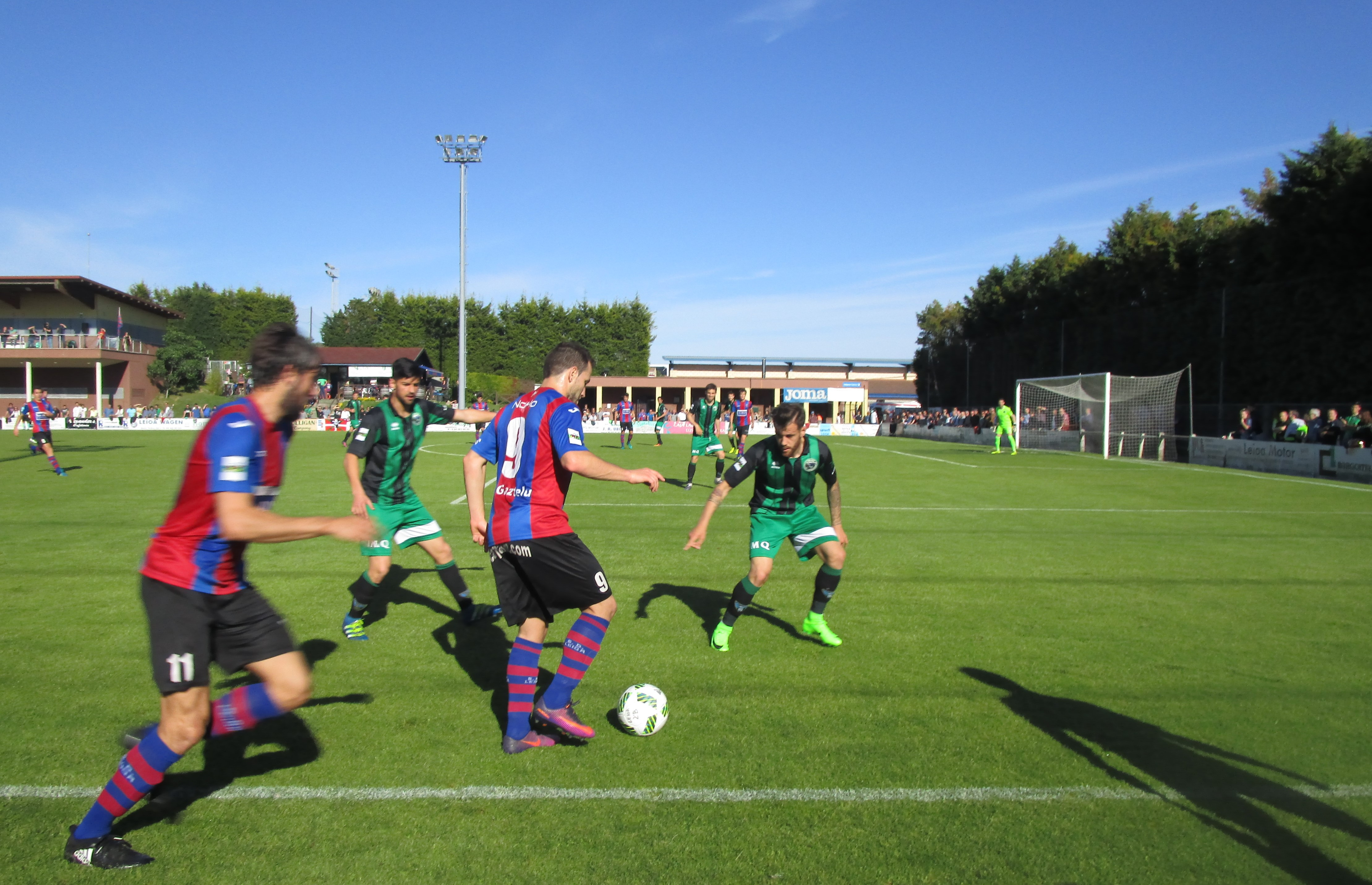
Sestao playing against SD Leioa in 2017

As of 10 February 2026

Note: Flags indicate national team as defined under FIFA eligibility rules; some limited exceptions apply. Players may hold more than one non-FIFA nationality.

No.	Pos.	Nation	Player
1	GK	ESP	Ander Iru
2	DF	ESP	Markel Peral
3	DF	ESP	Jon Rojo
4	DF	RUS	Anton Efremov
5	DF	ESP	Andoni Ugarte
6	MF	ESP	Eneko Delgado
7	FW	ESP	Ieltxu García
8	MF	ESP	Ander Laka
9	FW	ESP	Ander Castillo
10	FW	ESP	Pau Miguélez
11	MF	ESP	Gonzalo Zorrilla

No.	Pos.	Nation	Player
12	MF	ESP	Issa Boiro
13	GK	ESP	Ibon Urrosolo
15	DF	ESP	Gaizka Argente
16	MF	ESP	Josemi Castañeda
17	FW	ESP	Ander Bengoetxea
18	DF	ESP	Carlos González
20	FW	ESP	Adri Carrión
21	FW	ESP	Andoni Arzak
22	DF	ESP	Markel Etxeberria
23	MF	ESP	Iñaki Legu
24	MF	ESP	Mikel Zearreta (on loan from Basconia)
